= Tennis at the 2017 Summer Universiade – Mixed doubles =

Mixed doubles
- Tennis at the 2017 Summer Universiade

Final
- Champions: Erina Hayashi (JPN); Kaito Uesugi (JPN)
- Runners-up: Simona Parajová (SVK); Ivan Košec (SVK)
- Score: 7–5, 6–4

Events
Singles	men	women
Doubles	men	women	mixed
Team	men	women
← 2015 ·	Summer Universiade	· 2019 →

The mixed doubles tennis event at the 2017 Summer Universiade was held from August 24 to 29 at the Taipei Tennis Center in Taipei, Taiwan.

Erina Hayashi and Kaito Uesugi won the gold medal, defeating Simona Parajová and Ivan Košec in the final, 7–5, 6–4.

Chan Yung-jan and Hsieh Cheng-peng, and Jada Hart and Logan Staggs won the bronze medals.

== Seeds ==
All seeds receive a bye into the second round.

1. Chan Yung-jan / Hsieh Cheng-peng (TPE) (semifinals, withdrew; Bronze Medallists)
2. Kamila Kerimbayeva / Timur Khabibulin (KAZ) (second round)
3. Park Sang-hee / Lee Jea-moon (KOR) (quarterfinals)
4. Justyna Jegiołka / Kamil Gajewski (POL) (third round)
5. Miriam Kolodziejová / Dominik Kellovský (CZE) (quarterfinals)
6. Olivia Nicholls / Luke Johnson (GBR) (quarterfinals)
7. Erina Hayashi / Kaito Uesugi (JPN) (champions; Gold Medallists)
8. Anastasia Pivovarova / Richard Muzaev (RUS) (quarterfinals)
9. Chompoothip Jundakate / Nuttanon Kadchapanan (THA) (third round)
10. Eudice Chong / Wong Chun-hun (HKG) (third round)
11. Inês Mesquita / Nuno Borges (POR) (third round)

== Main draw ==
=== Key ===
- Q = Qualifier
- WC = Wild card
- LL = Lucky loser
- Alt = Alternate
- ITF = ITF entry
- PR = Protected ranking
- SR = Special ranking
- SE = Special exempt
- JE = Junior exempt
- JR = Junior Accelerator Programme entrant
- CO = College Accelerator Programme entrant
- NG = Next Gen Accelerator Program entrant
- w/o = Walkover
- r = Retired
- d = Defaulted

=== Finals ===
Quarterfinals
1	Chan Yung-jan (TPE); Hsieh Cheng-peng (TPE)	6	6
5	Miriam Kolodziejová (CZE); Dominik Kellovský (CZE)	3	3
3	Park Sang-hee (KOR); Lee Jea-moon (KOR)	3	6	[5]
7	Erina Hayashi (JPN); Kaito Uesugi (JPN)	6	3	[10]
8	Anastasia Pivovarova (RUS); Richard Muzaev (RUS)	3	7	[7]
Simona Parajová (SVK); Ivan Košec (SVK)	6	5	[10]
8	Olivia Nicholls (GBR); Luke Johnson (GBR)	2	6	[4]
Jada Hart (USA); Logan Staggs (USA)	6	2	[10]

Semifinals
1	Chan Yung-jan (TPE); Hsieh Cheng-peng (TPE)
7	Erina Hayashi (JPN); Kaito Uesugi (JPN)	w/o
Simona Parajová (SVK); Ivan Košec (SVK)	3	6	[10]
Jada Hart (USA); Logan Staggs (USA)	6	3	[6]

Final
7	Erina Hayashi (JPN); Kaito Uesugi (JPN)	7	6
Simona Parajová (SVK); Ivan Košec (SVK)	5	4

=== Top half ===
==== Section 1 ====
First round
M Hamlin (SWE); V Stjern (SWE)	6^{5}	6	[0]
E Maheta (IND); P Dahiya (IND)	7^{7}	3	[10]

Second round
1	Y-j Chan (TPE); C-p Hsieh (TPE)	6	6
E Maheta (IND); P Dahiya (IND)	2	1
LN Moura (BRA); A Scaff (BRA)	2	0
G Rey (SUI); E Sommer (SUI)	6	6
P Brglez (SLO); T Žitnik (SLO)	6	6
VY Gómez (COL); JM Jaramillo (COL)	3	2
M Rajendra (SRI); S Abeyanayake (SRI)	0	0
5	M Kolodziejová (CZE); D Kellovský (CZE)	6	6

Third round
1	Y-j Chan (TPE); C-p Hsieh (TPE)	6	7
G Rey (SUI); E Sommer (SUI)	2	5
P Brglez (SLO); T Žitnik (SLO)	3	4
5	M Kolodziejová (CZE); D Kellovský (CZE)	6	6

Quarterfinals
1	Y-j Chan (TPE); C-p Hsieh (TPE)	6	6
5	M Kolodziejová (CZE); D Kellovský (CZE)	3	3

==== Section 2 ====
First round

Second round
3	S-h Park (KOR); J-m Lee (KOR)	6	6
A Bacquié (FRA); R Cocouvi (FRA)	1	4
M Espíndola (MEX); A Delgado (MEX)	3	5
K Kapitány (HUN); G Madarász (HUN)	6	7
9	C Jundakate (THA); N Kadchapanan (THA)	6	6
K Peckl (AUT); P Ofner (AUT)	3	3
N Mogopodi (BOT); A Lekang (BOT)	1	0
7	E Hayashi (JPN); K Uesugi (JPN)	6	6

Third round
3	S-h Park (KOR); J-m Lee (KOR)	6	6
K Kapitány (HUN); G Madarász (HUN)	4	3
9	C Jundakate (THA); N Kadchapanan (THA)	4	5
7	E Hayashi (JPN); K Uesugi (JPN)	6	7

Quarterfinals
3	S-h Park (KOR); J-m Lee (KOR)	3	6	[5]
7	E Hayashi (JPN); K Uesugi (JPN)	6	3	[10]

=== Bottom half ===
==== Section 3 ====
First round
J Surraco (ARG); L Aranguren (ARG)	6	6
J Nabanoba (UGA); P Mutumba (UGA)	0	1

Second round
8	A Pivovarova (RUS); R Muzaev (RUS)	6	6
D Wagland (AUS); N Horton (AUS)	2	4
M Jespersen (DEN); E Hess-Olesen (DEN)	4	6	[6]
11	I Mesquita (POR); N Borges (POR)	6	4	[10]
J Capadocia (PHI); W Sabas (PHI)	2	0
S Parajová (SVK); I Košec (SVK)	6	6
J Surraco (ARG); L Aranguren (ARG)	0	2
4	J Jegiołka (POL); K Gajewski (POL)	6	6

Third round
8	A Pivovarova (RUS); R Muzaev (RUS)	6	6
11	I Mesquita (POR); N Borges (POR)	4	1
S Parajová (SVK); I Košec (SVK)	6	6
4	J Jegiołka (POL); K Gajewski (POL)	1	4

Quarterfinals
8	A Pivovarova (RUS); R Muzaev (RUS)	3	7	[7]
S Parajová (SVK); I Košec (SVK)	6	5	[10]

==== Section 4 ====
First round
J Hart (USA); L Staggs (USA)	7	6
N Piludu (ITA); M Micunco (ITA)	5	3

Second round
6	O Nicholls (GBR); L Johnson (GBR)	w/o
N Almahafza (JOR); Z Daher (JOR)
R Kahfiani (INA); A Soemarno (INA)	1	1
10	E Chong (HKG); C-h Wong (HKG)	6	6
B Ata El Khoury (LBN); E Ata El Khoury (LBN)	1	0
H van Zyl (RSA); A Nel (RSA)	6	6
J Hart (USA); L Staggs (USA)	6^{9}	6	[10]
2	K Kerimbayeva (KAZ); T Khabibulin (KAZ)	7^{11}	4	[6]

Third round
6	O Nicholls (GBR); L Johnson (GBR)	6	6
10	E Chong (HKG); C-h Wong (HKG)	4	4
H van Zyl (RSA); A Nel (RSA)	3	4
J Hart (USA); L Staggs (USA)	6	6

Quarterfinals
6	O Nicholls (GBR); L Johnson (GBR)	2	6	[4]
J Hart (USA); L Staggs (USA)	6	2	[10]
