= Tennis at the 2017 Summer Universiade – Men's singles =

Men's singles at the XXIX Summer Universiade
- Venue: Taipei Tennis Center
- Dates: August 21, 2017 – August 29, 2017
- Competitors: 69 from 40 nations

Medalists
1st place, gold medalist(s)		Jason Jung	Chinese Taipei
2nd place, silver medalist(s)		Hong Seong-chan	South Korea
3rd place, bronze medalist(s)		Nuno Borges	Portugal
3rd place, bronze medalist(s)		Roman Safiullin	Russia

Men's singles
- Tennis at the 2017 Summer Universiade

Events
Singles	men	women
Doubles	men	women	mixed
Team	men	women
← 2015 ·	Summer Universiade	· 2019 →

The men's singles tennis event at the 2017 Summer Universiade was held from August 21 to 29 at the Taipei Tennis Center in Taipei, Taiwan.

Jason Jung won the gold medal, defeating Hong Seong-chan in the final, 6–2, 6–4.

Nuno Borges and Roman Safiullin won the bronze medals.

== Seeds ==
All seeds receive a bye into the second round.

1. Jason Jung (TPE) (champion; Gold Medallist)
2. Roman Safiullin (RUS) (semifinals; Bronze Medallist)
3. Shintaro Imai (JPN) (quarterfinals)
4. Chung Hong (KOR) (third round)
5. Lee Kuan-yi (TPE) (quarterfinals, retired)
6. Denis Yevseyev (KAZ) (quarterfinals)
7. Hong Seong-chan (KOR) (final; Silver Medallist)
8. Nuno Borges (POR) (semifinals; Bronze Medallist)
9. Aslan Karatsev (RUS) (third round)
10. Dominik Kellovský (CZE) (second round)
11. Martin Redlicki (USA) (fourth round)
12. Piotr Matuszewski (POL) (third round)
13. Timur Khabibulin (KAZ) (fourth round)
14. Matěj Vocel (CZE) (fourth round)
15. Ivan Kosec (SVK) (second round)
16. Szymon Walków (POL) (second round)
17. Anthony Jackie Tang (HKG) (fourth round)
18. Mark Whitehouse (GBR) (fourth round)
19. Pol Wattanakul (THA) (third round)
20. Patrick Ofner (AUT) (fourth round)
21. Lucas Poullain (FRA) (fourth round)
22. Yeung Pak-long (HKG) (second round)
23. Phasawit Burapharittha (THA) (third round)
24. Nicholas Horton (AUS) (second round)
25. Alessandro Ceppellini (ITA) (third round)
26. Adam Moundir (SUI) (third round)
27. Tilen Žitnik (SLO) (second round)
28. Karl Kiur Saar (EST) (third round)
29. Yasitha De Silva (SRI) (second round)
30. Yuya Ito (JPN) (quarterfinals)

== Main draw ==
=== Key ===
- Q = Qualifier
- WC = Wild card
- LL = Lucky loser
- Alt = Alternate
- ITF = ITF entry
- PR = Protected ranking
- SR = Special ranking
- SE = Special exempt
- JE = Junior exempt
- JR = Junior Accelerator Programme entrant
- CO = College Accelerator Programme entrant
- NG = Next Gen Accelerator Program entrant
- w/o = Walkover
- r = Retired
- d = Defaulted

=== Finals ===
Quarterfinals
1	Jason Jung (TPE)	6	6
6	Denis Yevseyev (KAZ)	1	2
30	Yuya Ito (JPN)	4	0
8	Nuno Borges (POR)	6	6
7	Hong Seong-chan (KOR)	7	6
3	Shintaro Imai (JPN)	5	1
5	Lee Kuan-yi (TPE)	3	6	5^{r}
2	Roman Safiullin (RUS)	6	0	5

Semifinals
1	Jason Jung (TPE)	6	6
8	Nuno Borges (POR)	3	3
7	Hong Seong-chan (KOR)	6	6
2	Roman Safiullin (RUS)	3	4

Final
1	Jason Jung (TPE)	6	6
7	Hong Seong-chan (KOR)	2	4

=== Top half ===
==== Section 1 ====
First round
J Amazona (PHI)	2	1
A Delgado (MEX)	6	6

Second round
1	J Jung (TPE)	6	6
A Delgado (MEX)	2	2
A Scaff (BRA)	2	1
V Stjern (SWE)	6	6
24	N Horton (AUS)	3	2
J Findel-Hawkins (GBR)	6	6
M Engsted (DEN)	0	3
14	M Vocel (CZE)	6	6

Third round
1	J Jung (TPE)	6	6
V Stjern (SWE)	3	1
J Findel-Hawkins (GBR)	4	6^{0}
14	M Vocel (CZE)	6	7^{7}

Fourth round
1	J Jung (TPE)	6	7^{7}
14	M Vocel (CZE)	2	6^{5}

==== Section 2 ====
First round

Second round
12	P Matuszewski (POL)	6	7^{7}
N Fakih (LBN)	4	6^{5}
F Tamagnone (ARG)	4	7^{7}	1
20	P Ofner (AUT)	6	6^{2}	6
28	KK Saar (EST)	6	6
I Wettasinghe (SRI)	0	0
K Christoforou (CYP)	0	0^{r}
6	D Yevseyev (KAZ)	6	2

Third round
12	P Matuszewski (POL)	0	6^{5}
20	P Ofner (AUT)	6	7^{7}
28	KK Saar (EST)	1	0
6	D Yevseyev (KAZ)	6	6

Fourth round
20	P Ofner (AUT)	6^{4}	6^{2}
6	D Yevseyev (KAZ)	7^{7}	7^{7}

==== Section 3 ====
First round
G Madarász (HUN)	7^{15}	6^{3}	1
P Dahiya (IND)	6^{13}	7^{7}	6

Second round
4	Ho Chung (KOR)	6	6
P Dahiya (IND)	1	2
D Valent (SUI)	4	4
30	Y Ito (JPN)	6	6
19	P Wattanakul (THA)	6	6
A Soemarno (INA)	1	2
L Staggs (USA)	6	7^{7}
15	I Kosec (SVK)	2	6^{5}

Third round
4	Ho Chung (KOR)	6^{3}	7	5
30	Y Ito (JPN)	7^{7}	5	7
19	P Wattanakul (THA)	7^{7}	5	2
L Staggs (USA)	6^{0}	7	6

Fourth round
30	Y Ito (JPN)	6	6
L Staggs (USA)	2	2

==== Section 4 ====
First round
R Cocouvi (FRA)	3	6	6
M Okorn (SLO)	6	2	0

Second round
9	A Karatsev (RUS)	6	6
JL Maritz (RSA)	2	3
P Mutumba (UGA)	0	0
17	AJ Tang (HKG)	6	6
25	A Ceppellini (ITA)	7	6
M Montoya (COL)	5	3
R Cocouvi (FRA)	0	2
8	N Borges (POR)	6	6

Third round
9	A Karatsev (RUS)	5	1
17	AJ Tang (HKG)	7	6
25	A Ceppellini (ITA)	4	3
8	N Borges (POR)	6	6

Fourth round
17	AJ Tang (HKG)	6	4	6^{2}
8	N Borges (POR)	3	6	7^{7}

=== Bottom half ===
==== Section 5 ====
First round

Second round
7	S-c Hong (KOR)	6	6
R Siller (MEX)	1	2
M Alexander (NZL)	1	3
26	A Moundir (SUI)	6	6
18	M Whitehouse (GBR)	6	6
B Koncz (HUN)	1	2
E Hess-Olesen (DEN)	6	7
10	D Kellovský (CZE)	4	5

Third round
7	S-c Hong (KOR)	7^{7}	6
26	A Moundir (SUI)	6^{4}	3
18	M Whitehouse (GBR)	6	6^{1}	6
E Hess-Olesen (DEN)	2	7^{7}	3

Fourth round
7	S-c Hong (KOR)	6	6
18	M Whitehouse (GBR)	3	4

==== Section 6 ====
First round
Z Daher (JOR)	2	0
JM Jaramillo (COL)	6	6

Second round
13	T Khabibulin (KAZ)	6	6
NA Ramdani (INA)	2	2
M Saade (LBN)	0	0
23	P Burapharittha (THA)	6	6
27	T Žitnik (SLO)	6	6^{3}	2
T Pavlovský (SVK)	4	7^{7}	6
JM Jaramillo (COL)	0	1
3	S Imai (JPN)	6	6

Third round
13	T Khabibulin (KAZ)	6	6^{3}	6
23	P Burapharittha (THA)	1	7^{7}	2
T Pavlovský (SVK)	4	3
3	S Imai (JPN)	6	6

Fourth round
13	T Khabibulin (KAZ)	4	4
3	S Imai (JPN)	6	6

==== Section 7 ====
First round

Second round
5	K-y Lee (TPE)	6	6
M Micunco (ITA)	0	1
J Bendeck (HON)	6	6
29	Y De Silva (SRI)	1	2
22	P-l Yeung (HKG)	4	0
P Bonfre (SWE)	6	6
A Lekang (BOT)	0	2
11	Ma Redlicki (USA)	6	6

Third round
5	K-y Lee (TPE)	6	6
J Bendeck (HON)	1	1
P Bonfre (SWE)	5	3
11	Ma Redlicki (USA)	7	6

Fourth round
5	K-y Lee (TPE)	6	6
11	Ma Redlicki (USA)	2	2

==== Section 8 ====
First round
JR Mora (VEN)	2	6^{2}
Y Singh (IND)	6	7^{7}

Second round
16	S Walków (POL)	7^{7}	5	2
I Ortega (ARG)	6^{4}	7	6
W Sabas (PHI)	0	1
21	L Poullain (FRA)	6	6
L Rocha (BRA)	7	6^{8}	6
A Nel (RSA)	5	7^{10}	3
Y Singh (IND)	2	2
2	R Safiullin (RUS)	6	6

Third round
I Ortega (ARG)	0	1
21	L Poullain (FRA)	6	6
L Rocha (BRA)	2	0
2	R Safiullin (RUS)	6	6

Fourth round
21	L Poullain (FRA)	2	4
2	R Safiullin (RUS)	6	6
