= Tennis at the 2017 Summer Universiade – Women's singles =

Women's singles
- Tennis at the 2017 Summer Universiade

Final
- Champion: Varatchaya Wongteanchai (THA)
- Runner-up: Lee Ya-hsuan (TPE)
- Score: 7–6^{(7–5)}, 4–6, 6–1

Events
Singles	men	women
Doubles	men	women	mixed
Team	men	women
← 2015 ·	Summer Universiade	· 2019 →

The women's singles tennis event at the 2017 Summer Universiade was held from August 21 to 29 at the Taipei Tennis Center in Taipei, Taiwan.

Varatchaya Wongteanchai won the gold medal, defeating Lee Ya-hsuan in the final, 7–6^{(7–5)}, 4–6, 6–1.

Chang Kai-chen and Patcharin Cheapchandej won the bronze medals.

== Seeds ==
All seeds receive a bye into the second round.

1. Chang Kai-chen (TPE) (semifinals; Bronze Medallist)
2. Victoria Rodríguez (MEX) (quarterfinals)
3. Varatchaya Wongteanchai (THA) (champion; Gold Medallists)
4. Lee Ya-hsuan (TPE) (final; Silver Medallist)
5. Anastasia Frolova (RUS) (second round)
6. Haruka Kaji (JPN) (fourth round)
7. Kamila Kerimbayeva (KAZ) (third round)
8. Miriam Kolodziejová (CZE) (fourth round)
9. Risa Ushijima (JPN) (quarterfinals)
10. Patcharin Cheapchandej (THA) (semifinals; Bronze Medallist)
11. Emily Arbuthnott (GBR) (quarterfinals)
12. Irina Ramialison (FRA) (quarterfinals)
13. Paulina Czarnik (POL) (fourth round)
14. Pernilla Mendesová (CZE) (fourth round)
15. Alexandra Grinchishina (KAZ) (third round)
16. Ahn Yu-jin (KOR) (fourth round)
17. Natasha Piludu (ITA) (second round)
18. Alice Bacquié (FRA) (third round)
19. Justyna Jegiołka (POL) (third round)
20. Kerstin Peckl (AUT) (third round)
21. Emma Hurst (GBR) (fourth round)
22. Eetee Maheta (IND) (third round)
23. Victoria Kan (RUS) (third round; retired)
24. Inês Mesquita (POR) (third round)
25. Katherine Ip (HKG) (fourth round)
26. Wu Ho-ching (HKG) (third round)

== Main draw ==
=== Key ===
- Q = Qualifier
- WC = Wild card
- LL = Lucky loser
- Alt = Alternate
- ITF = ITF entry
- PR = Protected ranking
- SR = Special ranking
- SE = Special exempt
- JE = Junior exempt
- JR = Junior Accelerator Programme entrant
- CO = College Accelerator Programme entrant
- NG = Next Gen Accelerator Program entrant
- w/o = Walkover
- r = Retired
- d = Defaulted

=== Finals ===
Quarterfinals
1	Chang Kai-chen (TPE)	4	6	6
11	Emily Arbuthnott (GBR)	6	3	1
3	Varatchaya Wongteanchai (THA)	6	6
12	Irina Ramialison (FRA)	2	2
9	Risa Ushijima (JPN)	2	2
4	Lee Ya-hsuan (TPE)	6	6
10	Patcharin Cheapchandej (THA)	6	6
2	Victoria Rodríguez (MEX)	2	3

Semifinals
1	Chang Kai-chen (TPE)	2	6^{3}
3	Varatchaya Wongteanchai (THA)	6	7^{7}
4	Lee Ya-hsuan (TPE)	6	4	6
10	Patcharin Cheapchandej (THA)	3	6	2

Final
3	Varatchaya Wongteanchai (THA)	7^{7}	4	6
4	Lee Ya-hsuan (TPE)	6^{5}	6	1

=== Top half ===
==== Section 1 ====
First round
J Nalukwago (UGA)	0	0
S Palacio (COL)	6	6

Second round
1	K-c Chang (TPE)	6	6
S Palacio (COL)	0	0
J Surraco (ARG)	0	0
D Wagland (AUS)	6	6
22	E Maheta (IND)	6	6
F Asprino (BRA)	0	1
P Brglez (SLO)	5	1
16	Y-j Ahn (KOR)	7	6

Third round
1	K-c Chang (TPE)	6	6
D Wagland (AUS)	0	0
22	E Maheta (IND)	1	1
16	Y-j Ahn (KOR)	6	6

Fourth round
1	K-c Chang (TPE)	6	6
16	Y-j Ahn (KOR)	4	1

==== Section 2 ====
First round

Second round
11	E Arbuthnott (GBR)	6	6
C Abbate (ITA)	4	0
M Hamlin (SWE)	2	0
23	V Kan (RUS)	6	6
25	K Ip (HKG)	6	6
H Mediana (INA)	1	2
J Hinojosa (MEX)	6	5	2
7	K Kerimbayeva (KAZ)	4	7	6

Third round
11	E Arbuthnott (GBR)	6	3
23	V Kan (RUS)	3	0^{r}
25	K Ip (HKG)	7^{7}	6
7	K Kerimbayeva (KAZ)	6^{1}	2

Fourth round
11	E Arbuthnott (GBR)	6	4	6
25	K Ip (HKG)	0	6	1

==== Section 3 ====
First round

Second round
3	V Wongteanchai (THA)	6	6
M Mweene (ZAM)	0	1
N Mogopodi (BOT)	7	6
M Rajendra (SRI)	5	2
19	J Jegiołka (POL)	6	6
N Almahafza (JOR)	0	1
P Baral (NEP)
14	P Mendesová (CZE)	w/o

Third round
3	V Wongteanchai (THA)	6	6
N Mogopodi (BOT)	0	0
19	J Jegiołka (POL)	4	3
14	P Mendesová (CZE)	6	6

Fourth round
3	V Wongteanchai (THA)	6	3	7
14	P Mendesová (CZE)	2	6	5

==== Section 4 ====
First round

Second round
12	I Ramialison (FRA)	6	6
S de los Santos (PHI)	0	0
B Ata El Khoury (LBN)	0	0
24	I Mesquita (POR)	6	6
L de Kock (RSA)	2	4
T Fleming (USA)	6	6
M Jespersen (DEN)	7	3	2
6	H Kaji (JPN)	5	6	6

Third round
12	I Ramialison (FRA)	6	6
24	I Mesquita (POR)	3	2
T Fleming (USA)	3	4
6	H Kaji (JPN)	6	6

Fourth round
12	I Ramialison (FRA)	7	7^{7}
6	H Kaji (JPN)	5	6^{3}

=== Bottom half ===
==== Section 5 ====
First round

Second round
5	A Frolova (RUS)	6	2	5
J Hart (USA)	2	6	7
B Kalava (IND)	6	6
G Rey (SUI)	0	0
18	A Bacquié (FRA)	6	6
J Nabanoba (UGA)	0	0
B Cedermark (SWE)	2	1
9	R Ushijima (JPN)	6	6

Third round
J Hart (USA)	4	6	6^{5}
B Kalava (IND)	6	1	7^{7}
18	A Bacquié (FRA)	0	3
9	R Ushijima (JPN)	6	6

Fourth round
B Kalava (IND)	1	2
9	R Ushijima (JPN)	6	6

==== Section 6 ====
First round

Second round
15	A Grinchishina (KAZ)	6	6
C Therkildsen (DEN)	1	4
M Liyanage (SRI)	0	0
21	E Hurst (GBR)	6	6
K Kapitány (HUN)	1	4
A Andrinopoulos (AUS)	6	6
LN Moura (BRA)	4	0
4	Y-h Lee (TPE)	6	6

Third round
15	A Grinchishina (KAZ)	4	3
21	E Hurst (GBR)	6	6
A Andrinopoulos (AUS)	0	1
4	Y-h Lee (TPE)	6	6

Fourth round
21	E Hurst (GBR)	0	3
4	Y-h Lee (TPE)	6	6

==== Section 7 ====
First round

Second round
8	M Kolodziejová (CZE)	6	6
VY Gómez (COL)	0	1
H-j Yea (KOR)	4	3
26	H-c Wu (HKG)	6	6
20	K Peckl (AUT)	6	1	6
H van Zyl (RSA)	4	6	3
B Montiel (ARG)	1	0
10	P Cheapchandej (THA)	6	6

Third round
8	M Kolodziejová (CZE)	6	6
26	H-c Wu (HKG)	1	2
20	K Peckl (AUT)	0	1
10	P Cheapchandej (THA)	6	6

Fourth round
8	M Kolodziejová (CZE)	6	2	4
10	P Cheapchandej (THA)	0	6	6

==== Section 8 ====
First round

Second round
13	P Czarnik (POL)	6	6
S Parajová (SVK)	3	4
R Kahfiani (INA)	6	7^{7}
17	N Piludu (ITA)	4	6^{4}
M Capadocia (PHI)	6	6
K Sharma (NEP)	0	0
B Volk (SLO)	1	0
2	V Rodríguez (MEX)	6	6

Third round
13	P Czarnik (POL)	6	6
R Kahfiani (INA)	3	4
M Capadocia (PHI)	0^{r}
2	V Rodríguez (MEX)	5

Fourth round
13	P Czarnik (POL)	2	0
2	V Rodríguez (MEX)	6	6
