= Tennis at the 2017 Summer Universiade – Men's doubles =

Men's doubles
- Tennis at the 2017 Summer Universiade

Final
- Champions: Aslan Karatsev (RUS); Richard Muzaev (RUS)
- Runners-up: Jack Findel-Hawkins (GBR); Luke Johnson (GBR)
- Score: 6–1, 3–6, [10–7]

Events
Singles	men	women
Doubles	men	women	mixed
Team	men	women
← 2015 ·	Summer Universiade	· 2019 →

The men's doubles tennis event at the 2017 Summer Universiade was held from August 22 to 28 at the Taipei Tennis Center in Taipei, Taiwan.

Aslan Karatsev and Richard Muzaev won the gold medal, defeating Jack Findel-Hawkins and Luke Johnson in the final, 6–1, 3–6, [10–7].

Shintaro Imai and Kaito Uesugi, and Wong Chun-hun and Yeung Pak-long won the bronze medals.

== Seeds ==
The top two seeds receive a bye into the second round.

1. Hsieh Cheng-peng / Peng Hsien-yin (TPE) (quarterfinals)
2. Timur Khabibulin / Denis Yevseyev (KAZ) (quarterfinals)
3. Dominik Kellovský / Matěj Vocel (CZE) (quarterfinals)
4. Chung Yun-seong / Lee Jea-moon (KOR) (quarterfinals)
5. Shintaro Imai / Kaito Uesugi (JPN) (semifinals; Bronze Medallists)
6. Kamil Gajewski / Szymon Walków (POL) (second round)
7. Aslan Karatsev / Richard Muzaev (RUS) (champions; Gold Medallists)
8. Wong Chun-hun / Yeung Pak-long (HKG) (semifinals; Bronze Medallists)

== Draw ==
=== Key ===
- Q = Qualifier
- WC = Wild card
- LL = Lucky loser
- Alt = Alternate
- ITF = ITF entry
- PR = Protected ranking
- SR = Special ranking
- SE = Special exempt
- JE = Junior exempt
- JR = Junior Accelerator Programme entrant
- CO = College Accelerator Programme entrant
- NG = Next Gen Accelerator Program entrant
- w/o = Walkover
- r = Retired
- d = Defaulted

=== Finals ===
Semifinals
Jack Findel-Hawkins (GBR); Luke Johnson (GBR)	6	6
5	Shintaro Imai (JPN); Kaito Uesugi (JPN)	0	3
8	Wong Chun-hun (HKG); Yeung Pak-long (HKG)	4	5
7	Aslan Karatsev (RUS); Richard Muzaev (RUS)	6	7

Final
Jack Findel-Hawkins (GBR); Luke Johnson (GBR)	1	6	[7]
7	Aslan Karatsev (RUS); Richard Muzaev (RUS)	6	3	[10]

=== Top half ===
First round
N Fakih (LBN); J Slaibi (LBN)	7^{7}	6
J Gribling (ITA); P Panicucci (ITA)	6^{4}	2
N Kadchapanan (THA); P Kawin (THA)	2	4
J Findel-Hawkins (GBR); L Johnson (GBR)	6	6
A Soemarno (INA); NA Ramdani (INA)	1	4
6	K Gajewski (POL); S Walków (POL)	6	6
3	D Kellovský (CZE); M Vocel (CZE)	6	6
L Aranguren (ARG); I Suanno (ARG)	2	2
S Byreddy (IND); S Kumar (IND)	6	6
Y De Silva (SRI); P Pathirage (SRI)	4	3
A Lekang (BOT); I Tidimane (BOT)
B Koncz (HUN); G Madarász (HUN)	w/o
J Sanchez (PHI); J Villaluz (PHI)	0	0
5	S Imai (JPN); K Uesugi (JPN)	6	6

Second round
1	C-p Hsieh (TPE); H-y Peng (TPE)	6	6
N Fakih (LBN); J Slaibi (LBN)	1	0
J Findel-Hawkins (GBR); L Johnson (GBR)	6	6
6	K Gajewski (POL); S Walków (POL)	4	4
3	D Kellovský (CZE); M Vocel (CZE)	6	6
S Byreddy (IND); S Kumar (IND)	2	2
B Koncz (HUN); G Madarász (HUN)	2	2
5	S Imai (JPN); K Uesugi (JPN)	6	6

Quarterfinals
1	C-p Hsieh (TPE); H-y Peng (TPE)	4	6^{1}
J Findel-Hawkins (GBR); L Johnson (GBR)	6	7^{7}
3	D Kellovský (CZE); M Vocel (CZE)	3	6	[5]
5	S Imai (JPN); K Uesugi (JPN)	6	4	[10]

Semifinals
J Findel-Hawkins (GBR); L Johnson (GBR)	6	6
5	S Imai (JPN); K Uesugi (JPN)	0	3

=== Bottom half ===
First round
8	C-h Wong (HKG); P-l Yeung (HKG)	6	6
L Rocha (BRA); A Scaff (BRA)	4	2
J González (MEX); L Pineda (MEX)	7^{7}	4	[7]
R Cocouvi (FRA); J Eon (FRA)	6^{4}	6	[10]
Ma Redlicki (USA); L Staggs (USA)	6	6
Ž Papež (SLO); D Vertot (SLO)	3	1
M Engsted (DEN); E Hess-Olesen (DEN)	6	3	[18]
4	Y-s Chung (KOR); J-m Lee (KOR)	3	6	[20]
7	A Karatsev (RUS); R Muzaev (RUS)	6	6
JL Maritz (RSA); A Nel (RSA)	4	2
JM Jaramillo (COL); M Montoya (COL)	1	4
P Bonfre (SWE); V Stjern (SWE)	6	6
I Kosec (SVK); T Pavlovský (SVK)	6	6^{7}	[7]
A Moundir (SUI); E Sommer (SUI)	4	7^{9}	[10]

Second round
8	C-h Wong (HKG); P-l Yeung (HKG)	6	6
R Cocouvi (FRA); J Eon (FRA)	4	2
Ma Redlicki (USA); L Staggs (USA)	2	4
4	Y-s Chung (KOR); J-m Lee (KOR)	6	6
7	A Karatsev (RUS); R Muzaev (RUS)	6	6
P Bonfre (SWE); V Stjern (SWE)	2	4
A Moundir (SUI); E Sommer (SUI)	6	6^{4}	[10]
2	T Khabibulin (KAZ); D Yevseyev (KAZ)	4	7^{7}	[12]

Quarterfinals
8	C-h Wong (HKG); P-l Yeung (HKG)	6	6
4	Y-s Chung (KOR); J-m Lee (KOR)	2	2
7	A Karatsev (RUS); R Muzaev (RUS)	6	6
2	T Khabibulin (KAZ); D Yevseyev (KAZ)	2	4

Semifinals
8	C-h Wong (HKG); P-l Yeung (HKG)	4	5
7	A Karatsev (RUS); R Muzaev (RUS)	6	7
