= Tennis at the 2017 Summer Universiade – Women's doubles =

Women's doubles
- Tennis at the 2017 Summer Universiade

Final
- Champions: Chan Hao-ching (TPE); Chan Yung-jan (TPE)
- Runners-up: Varatchaya Wongteanchai (THA); Varunya Wongteanchai (THA)
- Score: 6–1, 7–5

Events
Singles	men	women
Doubles	men	women	mixed
Team	men	women
← 2015 ·	Summer Universiade	· 2019 →

The women's doubles tennis event at the 2017 Summer Universiade was held from August 22 to 28 at the Taipei Tennis Center in Taipei, Taiwan.

Chan Hao-ching and Chan Yung-jan won the gold medal, defeating Varatchaya Wongteanchai and Varunya Wongteanchai in the final, 6–1, 7–5.

Erina Hayashi and Robu Kajitani, and Emily Arbuthnott and Olivia Nicholls won the bronze medals.

== Seeds ==
The top three seeds receive a bye into the second round.

1. Chan Hao-ching / Chan Yung-jan (TPE) (champions; Gold Medallists)
2. Varatchaya Wongteanchai / Varunya Wongteanchai (THA) (final; Silver Medallists)
3. Erina Hayashi / Robu Kajitani (JPN) (semifinals; Bronze Medallists)
4. Paulina Czarnik / Justyna Jegiołka (POL) (second round)
5. Olga Doroshina / Anastasia Pivovarova (RUS) (quarterfinals)
6. Hong Seung-yeon / Park Sang-hee (KOR) (first round)
7. Alexandra Grinchishina / Kamila Kerimbayeva (KAZ) (quarterfinals)
8. Emily Arbuthnott / Olivia Nicholls (GBR) (semifinals; Bronze Medallists)

== Draw ==
=== Key ===
- Q = Qualifier
- WC = Wild card
- LL = Lucky loser
- Alt = Alternate
- ITF = ITF entry
- PR = Protected ranking
- SR = Special ranking
- SE = Special exempt
- JE = Junior exempt
- JR = Junior Accelerator Programme entrant
- CO = College Accelerator Programme entrant
- NG = Next Gen Accelerator Program entrant
- w/o = Walkover
- r = Retired
- d = Defaulted

=== Finals ===
Semifinals
1	Chan Hao-ching (TPE); Chan Yung-jan (TPE)	6	6
3	Erina Hayashi (JPN); Robu Kajitani (JPN)	1	3
8	Emily Arbuthnott (GBR); Olivia Nicholls (GBR)	2	7	[3]
2	Varatchaya Wongteanchai (THA); Varunya Wongteanchai (THA)	6	5	[10]

Final
1	Chan Hao-ching (TPE); Chan Yung-jan (TPE)	6	7
2	Varatchaya Wongteanchai (THA); Varunya Wongteanchai (THA)	1	5

=== Top half ===
First round
T Fleming (USA); J Hart (USA)	5	6	[10]
G Manifacio (MEX); V Rodríguez (MEX)	7	3	[8]
N Robič (SLO); B Volk (SLO)	2	1
AM Battista (ITA); N Piludu (ITA)	6	6
I Ramialison (FRA); L Tholey (FRA)	6	6
6	S-y Hong (KOR); S-h Park (KOR)	4	4
L de Kock (RSA); H van Zyl (RSA)	6	6
J Capadocia (PHI); R Nillasca (PHI)	0	0
R Kahfiani (INA); H Mediana (INA)	2	3
B Cedermark (SWE); M Hamlin (SWE)	6	6
B Kalava (IND); E Maheta (IND)	3	2
7	A Grinchishina (KAZ); K Kerimbayeva (KAZ)	6	6

Second round
1	H-c Chan (TPE); Y-j Chan (TPE)	6	6
T Fleming (USA); J Hart (USA)	3	0
AM Battista (ITA); N Piludu (ITA)	3	3
I Ramialison (FRA); L Tholey (FRA)	6	6
3	E Hayashi (JPN); R Kajitani (JPN)	6	6
L de Kock (RSA); H van Zyl (RSA)	0	2
B Cedermark (SWE); M Hamlin (SWE)	3	0
7	A Grinchishina (KAZ); K Kerimbayeva (KAZ)	6	6

Quarterfinals
1	H-c Chan (TPE); Y-j Chan (TPE)	6	6
I Ramialison (FRA); L Tholey (FRA)	3	2
3	E Hayashi (JPN); R Kajitani (JPN)	6	6
7	A Grinchishina (KAZ); K Kerimbayeva (KAZ)	4	2

Semifinals
1	H-c Chan (TPE); Y-j Chan (TPE)	6	6
3	E Hayashi (JPN); R Kajitani (JPN)	1	3

=== Bottom half ===
First round
8	E Arbuthnott (GBR); O Nicholls (GBR)	6	6
M Liyanage (SRI); M Rajendra (SRI)	0	0
A Andrinopoulos (AUS); D Wagland (AUS)	6	6
M Jespersen (DEN); C Therkildsen (DEN)	3	4
E Chong (HKG); K Ip (HKG)	w/o
N Mogopodi (BOT); P Ruele (BOT)
B Montiel (ARG); J Surraco (ARG)	0	2
4	P Czarnik (POL); J Jegiołka (POL)	6	6
5	O Doroshina (RUS); A Pivovarova (RUS)	6	6
V Henao (COL); S Palacio (COL)	0	0
P Baral (NEP); K Sharma (NEP)	w/o
J Nabanoba (UGA); J Nalukwago (UGA)
P Mendesová (CZE); E Rutarová (CZE)	6	6
F Asprino (BRA); LN Moura (BRA)	1	2

Second round
8	E Arbuthnott (GBR); O Nicholls (GBR)	6	6
A Andrinopoulos (AUS); D Wagland (AUS)	2	2
E Chong (HKG); K Ip (HKG)	6	6
4	P Czarnik (POL); J Jegiołka (POL)	3	3
5	O Doroshina (RUS); A Pivovarova (RUS)	6	6
P Baral (NEP); K Sharma (NEP)	0	0
P Mendesová (CZE); E Rutarová (CZE)	0	4
2	Vara Wongteanchai (THA); Varu Wongteanchai (THA)	6	6

Quarterfinals
8	E Arbuthnott (GBR); O Nicholls (GBR)	3	6	[10]
E Chong (HKG); K Ip (HKG)	6	4	[5]
5	O Doroshina (RUS); A Pivovarova (RUS)	1	0
2	Vara Wongteanchai (THA); Varu Wongteanchai (THA)	6	6

Semifinals
8	E Arbuthnott (GBR); O Nicholls (GBR)	2	7	[3]
2	Vara Wongteanchai (THA); Varu Wongteanchai (THA)	6	5	[10]
