= Tennis at the 2017 Summer Universiade – Men's team =

Men's team classification at the Universiade
- Venue: Taipei Tennis Center
- Dates: 29 August 2017
- Teams: 40

Medalists
1st place, gold medalist(s)		Chinese Taipei (TPE)
2nd place, silver medalist(s)		Japan (JPN)
3rd place, bronze medalist(s)		Russia (RUS)

Men's team
- Tennis at the 2017 Summer Universiade

Events
Singles	men	women
Doubles	men	women	mixed
Team	men	women
← 2015 ·	Summer Universiade	· 2019 →

The men's team classification tennis event at the 2017 Summer Universiade was held on 29 August 2017 at the Taipei Tennis Center in Taipei, Taiwan.

== Ranking system ==
The chart below shows that the points earn on each ranking in each events.

Rank	Points	
Rank	Singles	Doubles
1st place, gold medalist(s)	60	
2nd place, silver medalist(s)	40	
3rd place, bronze medalist(s)	20	
5/8	10	
9/16	5	—

If the results are same, the rank will be judged in the following steps:

- Medal counts
- Gold medal counts
- Best rank at the singles event.

== Results ==
=== Medalists ===
Rank	MS		MD		XD	
Rank	Athlete	Points	Athlete	Points	Athlete	Points
1st place, gold medalist(s)	Jason Jung (TPE)	60	Aslan Karatsev (RUS); Richard Muzaev (RUS)	60	Erina Hayashi (JPN); Kaito Uesugi (JPN)	60
2nd place, silver medalist(s)	Hong Seong-chan (KOR)	40	Jack Findel-Hawkins (GBR); Luke Johnson (GBR)	40	Simona Parajová (SVK); Ivan Kosec (SVK)	40
3rd place, bronze medalist(s)	Roman Safiullin (RUS)	20	Yeung Pak-long (HKG); Wong Chun-hun (HKG)	20	Chan Yung-jan (TPE); Hsieh Cheng-peng (TPE)	20
3rd place, bronze medalist(s)	Nuno Borges (POR)	20	Kaito Uesugi (JPN); Shintaro Imai (JPN)	20	Jada Hart (USA); Logan Staggs (USA)	20
5/8	Denis Yevseyev (KAZ)	10	Dominik Kellovský (CZE); Matěj Vocel (CZE)	10	Miriam Kolodziejová (CZE); Dominik Kellovský (CZE)	10
5/8	Yuya Ito (JPN)	10	Denis Yevseyev (KAZ); Timur Khabibulin (KAZ)	10	Olivia Nicholls (GBR); Luke Johnson (GBR)	10
5/8	Shintaro Imai (JPN)	10	Chung Yun-seong (KOR); Lee Jea-moon (KOR)	10	Park Sang-hee (KOR); Lee Jea-moon (KOR)	10
5/8	Lee Kuan-yi (TPE)	10	Hsieh Cheng-peng (TPE); Peng Hsien-yin (TPE)	10	Anastasia Pivovarova (RUS); Richard Muzaev (RUS)	10
9/16	Patrick Thomas Ofner (AUT)	5	—			
9/16	Timur Khabibulin (KAZ)	5	—			
9/16	Anthony Jackie Tang (HKG)	5	—			
9/16	Mark Whitehouse (GBR)	5	—			
9/16	Lucas Poullain (FRA)	5	—			
9/16	Matěj Vocel (CZE)	5	—			
9/16	Martin Redlicki (USA)	5	—			
9/16	Logan Staggs (USA)	5	—			

=== Points count ===
Rank	Team	Points			Total	Notes
Rank	Team	MS	MD	XD	Total	Notes
1st place, gold medalist(s)	Chinese Taipei (TPE)	70	10	20	100	
2nd place, silver medalist(s)	Japan (JPN)	20	20	60	100	
3rd place, bronze medalist(s)	Russia (RUS)	20	60	10	90	
	South Korea (KOR)	40	10	10	60	
	Great Britain (GBR)	5	40	10	55	
	Slovakia (SVK)	0	0	40	40	
	United States (USA)	10	0	20	30	
	Kazakhstan (KAZ)	15	10	0	25	
	Hong Kong (HKG)	5	20	0	25	
	Czech Republic (CZE)	5	10	10	25	
	Portugal (POR)	20	0	0	20	
	Austria (AUT)	5	0	0	5	
	France (FRA)	5	0	0	5	

^1 :Since both Chinese Taipei (TPE) and Japan (JPN) earned the same points, both won two medals (1 (gold) and 1 (bronze) ), both won 1 (gold) , and Jason Jung from Chinese Taipei placed first in men's singles event, which Ito Yuya placed on fifth. Therefore, Chinese Taipei defeated Japan on team classification.
