= Tennis at the 2017 Summer Universiade – Women's team =

Women's team classification at the Universiade
- Venue: Taipei Tennis Center
- Dates: 29 August 2017
- Teams: 37

Medalists
1st place, gold medalist(s)		Chinese Taipei (TPE)
2nd place, silver medalist(s)		Thailand (THA)
3rd place, bronze medalist(s)		Japan (JPN)

Women's team
- Tennis at the 2017 Summer Universiade

Events
Singles	men	women
Doubles	men	women	mixed
Team	men	women
← 2015 ·	Summer Universiade	· 2019 →

The women's team classification tennis event at the 2017 Summer Universiade was held on August 29 at the Taipei Tennis Center in Taipei, Taiwan.

== Ranking system ==
The chart below shows that the points earn on each ranking in each events.

Rank	Points	
Rank	Singles	Doubles
1st place, gold medalist(s)	60	
2nd place, silver medalist(s)	40	
3rd place, bronze medalist(s)	20	
5/8	10	
9/16	5	—

If the results are same, the rank will be judged in the following steps:

- Medal counts
- Gold medal counts
- Best rank at the singles event.

== Results ==
=== Medalists ===
Rank	WS		WD		XD	
Rank	Athlete	Points	Athlete	Points	Athlete	Points
1st place, gold medalist(s)	Varatchaya Wongteanchai (THA)	60	Chan Hao-ching (TPE); Chan Yung-jan (TPE)	60	Erina Hayashi (JPN); Kaito Uesugi (JPN)	60
2nd place, silver medalist(s)	Lee Ya-hsuan (TPE)	40	Varatchaya Wongteanchai (THA); Varunya Wongteanchai (THA)	40	Simona Parajová (SVK); Ivan Kosec (SVK)	40
3rd place, bronze medalist(s)	Chang Kai-chen (TPE)	20	Emily Arbuthnott (GBR); Olivia Nicholls (GBR)	20	Chan Yung-jan (TPE); Hsieh Cheng-peng (TPE)	20
3rd place, bronze medalist(s)	Patcharin Cheapchandej (THA)	20	Erina Hayashi (JPN); Robu Kajitani (JPN)	20	Jada Hart (USA); Logan Staggs (USA)	20
5/8	Risa Ushijima (JPN)	10	Irina Ramialison (FRA); Léa Tholey (FRA)	10	Miriam Kolodziejová (CZE); Dominik Kellovský (CZE)	10
5/8	Emily Arbuthnott (GBR)	10	Eudice Chong (HKG); Katherine Ip (HKG)	10	Olivia Nicholls (GBR); Luke Johnson (GBR)	10
5/8	Irina Ramialison (FRA)	10	Alexandra Grinchishina (KAZ); Kamila Kerimbayeva (KAZ)	10	Park Sang-hee (KOR); Lee Jea-moon (KOR)	10
5/8	Victoria Rodríguez (MEX)	10	Anastasia Pivovarova (RUS); Olga Doroshina (RUS)	10	Anastasia Pivovarova (RUS); Richard Muzaev (RUS)	10
9/16	Katherine Ip (HKG)	5	—			
9/16	Haruka Kaji (JPN)	5	—			
9/16	Emma Kate Hurst (GBR)	5	—			
9/16	Paulina Agniesz Czarnik (POL)	5	—			
9/16	Bhuvana Kalava (IND)	5	—			
9/16	Miriam Kolodziejová (CZE)	5	—			
9/16	Pernilla Mendesová (CZE)	5	—			
9/16	Ahn Yu-jin (KOR)	5	—			

=== Points count ===
Rank	Team	Points			Total	Notes
Rank	Team	MS	MD	XD	Total	Notes
1st place, gold medalist(s)	Chinese Taipei (TPE)	60	60	20	140	
2nd place, silver medalist(s)	Thailand (THA)	80	40	0	120	
3rd place, bronze medalist(s)	Japan (JPN)	15	20	60	95	
	Great Britain (GBR)	15	20	10	45	
	Slovakia (SVK)	0	0	40	40	
	Czech Republic (CZE)	10	0	10	20	
	France (FRA)	10	10	0	20	
	Russia (RUS)	0	10	10	20	
	United States (USA)	0	0	20	20	
	Hong Kong (HKG)	5	10	0	15	
	South Korea (KOR)	5	0	10	15	
	Kazakhstan (KAZ)	0	10	0	10	
	Mexico (MEX)	10	0	0	10	
	India (IND)	5	0	0	5	
	Poland (POL)	5	0	0	5	
