= Badminton at the 2017 Summer Universiade =

Badminton at the XXIX Summer Universiade
- Venue: Taipei Gymnasium
- Dates: 23–29 August
- Competitors: 256 from 39 nations

Badminton was contested at the 2017 Summer Universiade from August 23 to 29 in Taipei, Taiwan, in the Taipei Gymnasium. Men's and women's singles, men's, women's, and mixed doubles, and mixed team events will be contested.

== Participating nations ==
- Argentina (2)
- Australia (7)
- Austria (1)
- Belgium (1)
- Bhutan (4)
- Botswana (4)
- Brazil (4)
- Canada (11)
- Chinese Taipei (12)
- Democratic Republic of the Congo (4)
- Estonia (9)
- France (8)
- Germany (6)
- Hong Kong (6)
- India (11)
- Indonesia (8)
- Iran (2)
- Japan (12)
- Malaysia (11)
- Nepal (3)
- Nigeria (8)
- Pakistan (3)
- Philippines (12)
- Poland (7)
- Portugal (2)
- Russia (12)
- Serbia (3)
- Singapore (11)
- Slovakia (1)
- Slovenia (6)
- South Africa (4)
- South Korea (12)
- Sri Lanka (10)
- Suriname (2)
- Sweden (5)
- Thailand (12)
- Uganda (5)
- United States (12)
- Zambia (3)

== Medal summary ==
=== Medal table ===
Rank	Nation	Gold	Silver	Bronze	Total
1	Chinese Taipei (TPE)*	5	0	3	8
2	South Korea (KOR)	1	1	0	2
3	Japan (JPN)	0	3	2	5
4	Malaysia (MAS)	0	1	3	4
5	Thailand (THA)	0	1	2	3
6	Russia (RUS)	0	0	1	1
6	United States (USA)	0	0	1	1
Totals (7 entries)		6	6	12	24

=== Medal events ===
Event	Gold	Silver	Bronze
Men's singles	Wang Tzu-wei (TPE)	Kenta Nishimoto (JPN)	Pannawit Thongnuam (THA)
Men's singles	Wang Tzu-wei (TPE)	Kenta Nishimoto (JPN)	Yu Igarashi (JPN)
Women's singles	Tai Tzu-ying (TPE)	Lee Jang-mi (KOR)	Chiang Mei-hui (TPE)
Women's singles	Tai Tzu-ying (TPE)	Lee Jang-mi (KOR)	Yang Li Lian (MAS)
Men's doubles	South Korea (KOR); Kim Jae-hwan; Seo Seung-jae	Japan (JPN); Kenya Mitsuhashi; Katsuki Tamate	Malaysia (MAS); Jagdish Singh; Vincent Phuah Cheng Wei
Men's doubles	South Korea (KOR); Kim Jae-hwan; Seo Seung-jae	Japan (JPN); Kenya Mitsuhashi; Katsuki Tamate	Chinese Taipei (TPE); Lee Jhe-huei; Lee Yang
Women's doubles	Chinese Taipei (TPE); Hsu Ya-ching; Wu Ti-jung	Thailand (THA); Chayanit Chaladchalam; Phataimas Muenwong	Japan (JPN); Miyuki Kato; Miki Kashihara
Women's doubles	Chinese Taipei (TPE); Hsu Ya-ching; Wu Ti-jung	Thailand (THA); Chayanit Chaladchalam; Phataimas Muenwong	United States (USA); Annie Xu; Kerry Xu
Mixed doubles	Chinese Taipei (TPE); Wang Chi-lin; Lee Chia-hsin	Malaysia (MAS); Nur Mohd Azriyn Ayub; Goh Yea Ching	Russia (RUS); Rodion Alimov; Alina Davletova
Mixed doubles	Chinese Taipei (TPE); Wang Chi-lin; Lee Chia-hsin	Malaysia (MAS); Nur Mohd Azriyn Ayub; Goh Yea Ching	Chinese Taipei (TPE); Lee Yang; Hsu Ya-ching
Mixed team	Chinese Taipei (TPE); Chiang Mei-hui; Hsu Jen-hao; Hsu Ya-ching; Lee Chia-hsin; Lee Jhe-huei; Lee Yang; Tai Tzu-ying; Wang Chi-lin; Wang Tzu-wei; Wen Hao-yun; Wu Ti-jung; Yang Po-hsuan	Japan (JPN); Yu Igarashi; Miki Kashihara; Miyuki Kato; Ririka Katsumata; Sho Kawabata; Kenya Mitsuhashi; Rena Miyaura; Kenta Nishimoto; Shuhei Ozeki; Natsumi Shimoda; Ayaho Sugino; Katsuki Tamate	Thailand (THA); Nuntakarn Aimsaard; Wannawat Ampunsuwan; Inkarat Apisuk; Chayanit Chaladchalam; Natchpapha Chatupornkarnchana; Sanicha Chumnibannakarn; Tinn Isriyanet; Phataimas Muenwong; Kittisak Namdash; Natcha Saengchote; Pannawit Thongnuam; Prinyawat Thongnuam
Mixed team	Chinese Taipei (TPE); Chiang Mei-hui; Hsu Jen-hao; Hsu Ya-ching; Lee Chia-hsin; Lee Jhe-huei; Lee Yang; Tai Tzu-ying; Wang Chi-lin; Wang Tzu-wei; Wen Hao-yun; Wu Ti-jung; Yang Po-hsuan	Japan (JPN); Yu Igarashi; Miki Kashihara; Miyuki Kato; Ririka Katsumata; Sho Kawabata; Kenya Mitsuhashi; Rena Miyaura; Kenta Nishimoto; Shuhei Ozeki; Natsumi Shimoda; Ayaho Sugino; Katsuki Tamate	Malaysia (MAS); Nur Mohd Azriyn Ayub; Lyddia Cheah Yi Yu; Jagdish Singh; Goh Yea Ching; Muhammad Syawal Mohd Ismail; Vincent Phuah Cheng Wei; Satheishtharan Ramachandran; Desiree Siow Hao Sha; Yang Li Lian; Yap Rui Chen; Zulfadli Zulkiffli
