= Roller Sports at the 2017 Summer Universiade – Women's 300 metres time trial =

Women's 300 metres time trial at the XXIX Summer Universiade
- Venues: Yingfeng Riverside Park Roller Sports Rink (A)
- Dates: 21 August
- Competitors: 17 from 9 nations

Medalists
1st place, gold medalist(s)		An Yi-seul	South Korea
2nd place, silver medalist(s)		Chen Ying-chu	Chinese Taipei
3rd place, bronze medalist(s)		Shin So-yeong	South Korea

The women's 300 metres time trial event at the 2017 Summer Universiade was held on 21 August at the Yingfeng Riverside Park Roller Sports Rink (A).

== Record ==
Category	Athlete	Record	Date	Place
World record	(South Korea) Shin So-yeong	25.702	15 November 2015	Kaoshiung, Taiwan

== Results ==
Qualified for the final

=== Preliminary Round ===
Rank	Athlete	Results
1	Chen Ying-chu (TPE)	25.803
2	Li Meng-chu (TPE)	26.596
3	An Yi-seul (KOR)	26.600
4	Shin So-yeong (KOR)	26.747
5	María Fernanda Timms (COL)	27.228
6	Karen Dayanna Restrepo Rengifo (COL)	27.551
7	Benedetta Rossini (ITA)	27.953
8	Wong Vanessa Natalie (HKG)	28.157
9	Carlotta Camarin (ITA)	28.243
10	Yuri Yoshino (JPN)	28.962
11	Rina Jasmin Von Burg (SUI)	29.013
12	Eleonora Kopilovic (HUN)	29.100
13	Kira Yasutaka (JPN)	29.727
14	Jana Linda Von Burg (SUI)	29.827
15	Reka Szabina Toeroek (HUN)	31.303
16	Daria Gorbatenko (RUS)	32.015
17	Elena Trandafilova (RUS)	32.833

=== Final ===
Rank	Athlete	Results
1st place, gold medalist(s)	An Yi-seul (KOR)	25.805
2nd place, silver medalist(s)	Chen Ying-chu (TPE)	25.828
3rd place, bronze medalist(s)	Shin So-yeong (KOR)	26.570
4	Li Meng-chu (TPE)	26.573
5	María Fernanda Timms (COL)	27.244
6	Karen Dayanna Restrepo Rengifo (COL)	27.415
7	Benedetta Rossini (ITA)	27.503
8	Wong Vanessa Natalie (HKG)	27.866
9	Yuri Yoshino (JPN)	28.270
10	Carlotta Camarin (ITA)	28.301
11	Rina Jasmin Von Burg (SUI)	28.799
12	Eleonora Kopilovic (HUN)	29.074
