= Tennis at the 2017 Summer Universiade =

- Date: 21–29 August
- Edition: 18th
- Location: (Chinese Taipei) Taipei Tennis Center, Taipei, Taiwan

Champions

Men's singles
- Jason Jung (TPE)

Women's singles
- Varatchaya Wongteanchai (THA)

Men's doubles
- Aslan Karatsev / Richard Muzaev (RUS)

Women's doubles
- Chan Hao-ching / Chan Yung-jan (TPE)

Mixed doubles
- Erina Hayashi / Kaito Uesugi (JPN)

Men's team
- Chinese Taipei (TPE)

Women's team
- Chinese Taipei (TPE)
- Summer Universiade

Tennis was contested at the 2017 Summer Universiade from August 21 to 29 at the Taipei Tennis Center in Taipei, Taiwan.

== Participating nations ==
A total of 186 athletes from 42 nations competed in tennis at the 2017 Summer Universiade:

- Argentina (6)
- Australia (3)
- Austria (2)
- Botswana (4)
- Brazil (4)
- Chinese Taipei (8)
- Colombia (5)
- Cyprus (1)
- Czech Republic (5)
- Denmark (4)
- Estonia (1)
- France (6)
- Great Britain (6)
- Honduras (1)
- Hong Kong (6)
- Hungary (3)
- India (6)
- Indonesia (4)
- Italy (7)
- Japan (7)
- Jordan (2)
- Kazakhstan (4)
- Lebanon (5)
- Mexico (8)
- Nepal (2)
- New Zealand (1)
- Philippines (8)
- Poland (5)
- Portugal (2)
- Russia (7)
- Slovakia (3)
- Slovenia (7)
- South Africa (4)
- South Korea (8)
- Sri Lanka (6)
- Sweden (4)
- Switzerland (4)
- Thailand (8)
- Uganda (3)
- United States (4)
- Venezuela (1)
- Zambia (1)

== Medal summary ==
=== Medal table ===
Host nation

Rank	Nation	Gold	Silver	Bronze	Total
1	Chinese Taipei (TPE)*	4	1	2	7
2	Thailand (THA)	1	2	1	4
3	Japan (JPN)	1	1	3	5
4	Russia (RUS)	1	0	2	3
5	Great Britain (GBR)	0	1	1	2
6	Slovakia (SVK)	0	1	0	1
6	South Korea (KOR)	0	1	0	1
8	Hong Kong (HKG)	0	0	1	1
8	Portugal (POR)	0	0	1	1
8	United States (USA)	0	0	1	1
Totals (10 entries)		7	7	12	26

=== Events ===
Event	Gold	Silver	Bronze
Men's singles	Jason Jung; Chinese Taipei	Hong Seong-chan; South Korea	Nuno Borges; Portugal
Men's singles	Jason Jung; Chinese Taipei	Hong Seong-chan; South Korea	Roman Safiullin; Russia
Women's singles	Varatchaya Wongteanchai; Thailand	Lee Ya-hsuan; Chinese Taipei	Chang Kai-chen; Chinese Taipei
Women's singles	Varatchaya Wongteanchai; Thailand	Lee Ya-hsuan; Chinese Taipei	Patcharin Cheapchandej; Thailand
Men's doubles	Russia (RUS); Aslan Karatsev; Richard Muzaev	Great Britain (GBR); Jack Findel-Hawkins; Luke Johnson	Japan (JPN); Shintaro Imai; Kaito Uesugi
Men's doubles	Russia (RUS); Aslan Karatsev; Richard Muzaev	Great Britain (GBR); Jack Findel-Hawkins; Luke Johnson	Hong Kong (HKG); Wong Chun-hun; Yeung Pak-long
Women's doubles	Chinese Taipei (TPE); Chan Hao-ching; Chan Yung-jan	Thailand (THA); Varatchaya Wongteanchai; Varunya Wongteanchai	Japan (JPN); Erina Hayashi; Robu Kajitani
Women's doubles	Chinese Taipei (TPE); Chan Hao-ching; Chan Yung-jan	Thailand (THA); Varatchaya Wongteanchai; Varunya Wongteanchai	Great Britain (GBR); Emily Arbuthnott; Olivia Nicholls
Mixed doubles	Japan (JPN); Erina Hayashi; Kaito Uesugi	Slovakia (SVK); Simona Parajová; Ivan Kosec	Chinese Taipei (TPE); Chan Yung-jan; Hsieh Cheng-peng
Mixed doubles	Japan (JPN); Erina Hayashi; Kaito Uesugi	Slovakia (SVK); Simona Parajová; Ivan Kosec	United States (USA); Jada Hart; Logan Staggs
Men's team classification	Chinese Taipei (TPE); Hsieh Cheng-peng; Jason Jung; Lee Kuan-yi; Peng Hsien-yin	Japan (JPN); Shintaro Imai; Yuya Ito; Kaito Uesugi	Russia (RUS); Aslan Karatsev; Richard Muzaev; Roman Safiullin
Women's team classification	Chinese Taipei (TPE); Chan Hao-ching; Chan Yung-jan; Chang Kai-chen; Lee Ya-hsuan	Thailand (THA); Patcharin Cheapchandej; Chompoothip Jundakate; Varatchaya Wongteanchai; Varunya Wongteanchai	Japan (JPN); Erina Hayashi; Haruka Kaji; Robu Kajitani; Risa Ushijima

== See also ==
- Tennis at the Summer Universiade
