= Roller Sports at the 2017 Summer Universiade – Men's 300 metres time trial =

Men's 300 metres time trial at the XXIX Summer Universiade
- Venues: Yingfeng Riverside Park Roller Sports Rink (A)
- Dates: 21 August
- Competitors: 18 from 10 nations

Medalists
1st place, gold medalist(s)		Kim Jin-young	South Korea
2nd place, silver medalist(s)		Kao Mao-chieh	Chinese Taipei
3rd place, bronze medalist(s)		Hong Seung-gi	South Korea

The men's 300 metres time trial event at the 2017 Summer Universiade was held on 21 August at the Yingfeng Riverside Park Roller Sports Rink (A).

== Record ==
Category	Athlete	Record	Date	Place
World record	(Colombia) Andrés Jiménez	23.415	15 November 2015	Kaoshiung, Taiwan

== Results ==
Qualified for the final

=== Preliminary Round ===
Rank	Heat	Athlete	Results
1	1	Kim Jin-young (KOR)	24.320
2	1	Sung Ching-yang (TPE)	24.332
3	1	Cesar Enrique Nunez Almanze (COL)	24.580
4	1	Kao Mao-chieh (TPE)	24.757
5	1	Jaime Rodrigo Uribe Mogollon (COL)	24.849
6	1	Hong Seung-gi (KOR)	24.965
7	1	Matej Pravda (CZE)	25.262
8	1	Mattia Diamanti (ITA)	25.308
9	1	Cristian Sartorato (ITA)	25.457
10	1	Etienne Kris Ramali (GER)	25.470
11	1	Kengo Kawabata (JPN)	25.830
12	1	Thomas Petutschnigg (AUT)	25.928
13	1	Katsuki Kato (JPN)	26.021
14	1	Nils Fischer (GER)	26.077
15	1	Maksim Gutsalov (RUS)	27.914
16	1	Miha Remic (SLO)	28.036
17	1	Sergey Fokin (RUS)	28.267
18	1	Štěpán Šváb (CZE)	29.330

=== Final ===
Rank	Athlete	Results
1st place, gold medalist(s)	Kim Jin-young (KOR)	23.949
2nd place, silver medalist(s)	Kao Mao-chieh (TPE)	24.371
3rd place, bronze medalist(s)	Hong Seung-gi (KOR)	24.452
4	Cesar Enrique Nunez Almanze (COL)	24.504
5	Sung Ching-yang (TPE)	24.939
6	Jaime Rodrigo Uribe Mogollon (COL)	24.966
7	Matej Pravda (CZE)	25.210
8	Mattia Diamanti (ITA)	25.267
9	Etienne Kris Ramali (GER)	25.307
10	Cristian Sartorato (ITA)	25.407
11	Thomas Petutschnigg (AUT)	25.621
12	Kengo Kawabata (JPN)	25.806
