= Austria at the 2017 Summer Universiade =

- IOC code: AUT
- NOC: Unisport Austria

in Taipei, Taiwan 19 – 30 August 2017
- Competitors: 41 in 10 sports
- Medals Ranked 40th: Gold 1 Silver 0 Bronze 1 Total 2

Summer Universiade appearances
- 1959; 1961; 1963; 1965; 1967; 1970; 1973; 1975; 1977; 1979; 1981; 1983; 1985; 1987; 1989; 1991; 1993; 1995; 1997; 1999; 2001; 2003; 2005; 2007; 2009; 2011; 2013; 2015; 2017; 2019; 2021; 2025; 2027

Austria participated at the 2017 Summer Universiade in Taipei, Taiwan with 41 competitors in 10 sports.

== Competitors ==
The following table lists Austria's delegation per sport and gender.

Sport	Men	Women	Total
Athletics	3	4	7
Badminton	0	1	1
Fencing	2	4	6
Golf	1	2	3
Artistic gymnastics	4	1	5
Judo	1	2	3
Roller Sports	3	0	3
Swimming	4	1	5
Table tennis	3	3	6
Tennis	1	1	2
Total	22	19	41

== Medalists ==
The following Austria competitors won medals at the games.

Medal	Name	Sport	Event	Date
Gold	Verena Preiner	Athletics	Women's heptathlon	August 27
Bronze	Andreas Vojta	Athletics	Men's 5000 m	August 28

Medals by sport
Sport	1st place, gold medalist(s)	2nd place, silver medalist(s)	3rd place, bronze medalist(s)	Total
Athletics	1	0	1	2
Total	1	0	1	2

== Athletics ==
=== Men ===
Athlete	Event	Round 1		Round 2		Semifinal		Final	
Athlete	Event	Result	Rank	Result	Rank	Result	Rank	Result	Rank
Markus Fuchs	100m	10.62	3Q	10.64	5	Did Not Advance			
Markus Fuchs	200	21.79	5	Did Not Advance					
Dominik Hufnagl	400m Hurdles	51.24	5q	—N/a		52.29	6	Did Not Advance	
Andreas Vojta	5000m	14:29.78	7q	—N/a				14:02.65	3rd place, bronze medalist(s)

=== Women ===
==== Track Events ====
Athlete	Event	Round 1		Round 2		Semifinal		Final	
Athlete	Event	Result	Rank	Result	Rank	Result	Rank	Result	Rank
Stephanie Bendrat	100m Hurdles	13.50	2Q	—N/a		13.64	3q	13.74	7
Viola Kleiser	100m	11.82	2Q	11.80	3Q	12.07	8	Did Not Advance	

==== Field Events ====
Athlete	Event	Qualification		Final	
Athlete	Event	Distance	Position	Distance	Position
Victoria Hudson	Javelin	49.35	11	Did Not Advance	

==== Combined Events ====
Heptathlon

Athlete	Event	100H	HJ	SP	200 m	LJ	JT	800 m	Final	Rank
Verena Preiner	Result	13.90	1.77	13.32	24.82	5.94	48.61	2:09.35	6224	1st place, gold medalist(s)
Verena Preiner	Points	993	941	749	903	831	833	974	6224	1st place, gold medalist(s)

== Badminton ==
Athlete	Event	Round of 128	Round of 64	Round of 32	Round of 16	Quarterfinal	Semifinal	Final / BM	
Athlete	Event	Opposition Score	Opposition Score	Opposition Score	Opposition Score	Opposition Score	Opposition Score	Opposition Score	Rank
Elisabeth Baldauf	Women's Singles	—N/a	Kerry Yifei Xu (USA); L 0-2	Did Not Advance					34

== Fencing ==
Athlete	Event	Round of 128	Round of 64	Round of 32	Round of 16	Quarterfinal	Semifinal	Final / BM	
Athlete	Event	Opposition Score	Opposition Score	Opposition Score	Opposition Score	Opposition Score	Opposition Score	Opposition Score	Rank
Freya Cenker	Women's Foil Individual	—N/a	Giselle Vicatos (RSA); W 15-8	Vanessa Kimberley Cheung (HKG); L 8-15	did not advance				23
Alexander Korlath	Men's Épée Individual	Max Rod (POR); L 8-15	did not advance						69
Paula Schmidl	Women's Épée Individual	Bye	Gaia-Marianna Salm (EST); W 9-7	Sofia Tauriainen (FIN); W 15-7	Sera Song (KOR); L 15-12	did not advance			11
Gilbert Schwarz	Men's Sabre Individual	—N/a	Edward Barloy (FRA); L 9-15	did not advance					50
Olivia Wohlgemuth	Women's Foil Individual	—N/a	Bye	Chaeyeong Ko (KOR); W 15-13	Irina Elestina (RUS); L 5-15	did not advance			11
Freya Cenker; Kim Weiss; Olivia Wohlgemuth; Paula Schmidl	Women's Foil Team	—N/a			Republic of Korea (KOR); L 34-45	did not advance			11

== Golf ==
Athlete	Event	Round 1	Round 2	Round 3	Total		
Athlete	Event	Score	Score	Score	Score	Par	Rank
Markus Cristopher Maukner	Men's Individual	75	72	75	222	6	=33
Ines Fendt	Women's Individual	81	77	77	235	19	=35
Julia Unterweger	Women's Individual	79	78	79	235	19	=35
Ines Fendt; Julia Unterweger	Women's Team	160	155	155	470	—N/a	15

== Gymnastics ==
=== Artistic ===
Team

Athlete	Event	Apparatus						Total	Rank
Athlete	Event	F	PH	R	V	PB	HB	Total	Rank
Alexander Brenda	Men's Team	13.300	12.100	12.000	13.650	12.750	10.100	73.900	38
Xheni Dyrmishi	Men's Team	11.800	13.700	—N/a				25.500	110
Vinzenz Hoeck	Men's Team	12.100	11.450	14.500	13.700	13.300	11.600	76.650	31
Matthias Schwab	Men's Team	—N/a	11.650	12.450	12.800	13.300	13.325	63.525	60
Total	Men's Team	37.200	37.450	38.950	40.150	39.350	35.025	228.125	15

Individual

Athlete	Event	Apparatus				Total	Rank
Athlete	Event	V	UB	BB	F	Total	Rank
Jasmin Mader	Women's All-Around	13.400	12.400	11.750	12.000	49.550	14

== Judo ==
Athlete	Event	Round of 64	Round of 32	Round of 16	Quarterfinals	Repechage 32	Repechage 16	Repechage 8	Final Repechage	Semifinals	Final / BM	
Athlete	Event	Opposition Result	Opposition Result	Opposition Result	Opposition Result	Opposition Result	Opposition Result	Opposition Result	Opposition Result	Opposition Result	Opposition Result	Rank
Mara Tabea Kraft	Women's -48 kg	—N/a	Mai Umekita (JPN); L 00–11	Bye			Otgontsetseg Galbadrakh (KAZ); L 00–10	did not advance				N/A
Susanne Lechner	Women's -63 kg	—N/a	Caroline Marie Peschaud (FRA); L 00–02S1	did not advance								N/A
Andreas Tiefgraber	Men's -66 kg	Abdelkrim Moura Ladj (ALG); W 00–00S2	Baul An (KOR); L 10-00S1	Bye			Sheng-Ting Huang (TPE); W 01–00S1	Sacha Henri M Flament (FRA); W 01S1–00S1	Abdula Abdulzhalilov (RUS); L 00-01	did not advance		7

== Roller Sports ==
Athlete	Event	Preliminary		Semifinal		Final	
Athlete	Event	Time	Rank	Time	Rank	Time/Points	Rank
Christian Kromoser	Men's 10000m Points-Elimination	—N/a				EL	7
Christian Kromoser	Men's 15000m Elimination	—N/a				EL	5
Christian Kromoser	Men's 500m Elimination	42.675	5	Did Not Advance			15
Christian Kromoser	Men's Marathon	—N/a				1:07:38.237	13
Thomas Petutschnigg	Men's 300m Time Trial	25.928	12q	—N/a		25.621	11
Thomas Petutschnigg	Men's 1000m Sprint	—N/a		1:24.521	5	Did Not Advance	10
Thomas Petutschnigg	Men's 500m Sprint	40.884	3	Did Not Advance			10
Thomas Petutschnigg	Men's Marathon	—N/a				1:16:34.521	24
Jakob Ulreich	Men's 10000m Points-Elimination	—N/a				EL	7
Jakob Ulreich	Men's 1000m Sprint	—N/a		1:24.512	4	Did Not Advance	9
Jakob Ulreich	Men's 15000m Elimination	—N/a				EL	5
Jakob Ulreich	Men's Marathon	—N/a				1:09:44.423	17
Jakob Ulreich; Christian Kromoser; Thomas Petutschnigg	Men's 3000m Relay	4:08.272	4	—N/a		Did Not Advance	7

== Swimming ==
=== Men ===
Athlete	Event	Heat		Semifinal		Final	
Athlete	Event	Time	Rank	Time	Rank	Time	Rank
Johannes Dietrich	100m Breaststroke	1:02.79	8	did not advance			
Johannes Dietrich	200m Breaststroke	2:16.74	7	did not advance			
Johannes Dietrich	50m Breaststroke	29.12	7	did not advance			
Alexander Knabl	100m Freestyle	51.45	7	did not advance			
Alexander Knabl	50m Freestyle	23.04	1	did not advance			
Bernhard Reitshammer	100m Backstroke	57.65	8	did not advance			
Bernhard Reitshammer	50m Backstroke	26.41	3	did not advance			
Bernhard Reitshammer	100m Freestyle	51.25	7	did not advance			
Bernhard Reitshammer	50m Breaststroke	28.65	4	did not advance			
Bernhard Reitshammer	50m Freestyle	23.28	5	did not advance			
Sascha Michel Subarsky	50m Butterfly	24.95	7	did not advance			
Sascha Michel Subarsky	100m Butterfly	55.47	8	did not advance			
Johannes Dietrich; Alexander Knabl; Bernhard Reitshammer; Sascha Michel Subarsky	4 × 100 m Freestyle Relay	3:28.06	7	did not advance			
Johannes Dietrich; Alexander Knabl; Bernhard Reitshammer; Sascha Michel Subarsky	4 × 100 m Medley Relay	3:45.70	4	did not advance			

=== Women ===
Athlete	Event	Heat		Semifinal		Final	
Athlete	Event	Time	Rank	Time	Rank	Time	Rank
Claudia Hufnagl	400m Individual Medley	4:53.96	2	did not advance			
Claudia Hufnagl	100m Butterfly	1:01.40	2	did not advance			
Claudia Hufnagl	200m Butterfly	2:14.27	4Q	2:13.21	5	did not advance	

== Table Tennis ==
Athlete	Event	Group Stage			Round of 128	Round of 64	Round of 32	Round of 16	Quarterfinals	Semifinals	Final / BM	
Athlete	Event	Opposition Result	Opposition Result	Opposition Result	Opposition Result	Opposition Result	Opposition Result	Opposition Result	Opposition Result	Opposition Result	Opposition Result	Rank
Ao Alexander Chen	Men's Singles	Matias Mario Waldszan (ARG); W 3-0	Antony Arida (LBN); W 3-0	—N/a		Roger Rao (NZL); W 4-0	Masaki Yoshida (JPN); L 2-4	Did Not Advance				17
Simon Pfeffer	Men's Singles	Sheung Hei Poon (HKG); W 3-0	Daniel Mauricio Pava Riano (COL); W 3-0	—N/a		Alin Marian Spelbus (ROU); W 4-3	Yuya Oshima (JPN); L 2-4	Did Not Advance				17
Martin Storf	Men's Singles	Colin Stuart Dalgleish (HKG); W 3-0	Marcelo Alejandro Fernandez Silva (CHI); W 3-0	—N/a		Taras Merzlikin (RUS); L 1-4	Did Not Advance					33
Chen; Pfeffer	Men's Doubles	—N/a				Rao/Shu (NZL); W 3-0	Bayarsaikhan/ Turumbaatar (MGL); W WO-0	Landrieu/ Robinot (FRA); W 3-1	Chen/Chiang (TPE); L 0-4	Did Not Advance		5
Chen; Pfeffer; Storf	Men's Team	Mongolia (MGL); W 3-0	Hong Kong (HKG); W 3-1	Latvia (LAT); W 3-0	—N/a			Russia (RUS); L 1-3	Did Not Advance			9
Ines Diendorfer	Women's Singles	Roksana Anna Zalomska (POL); L 0-3	Rei Yamamoto (JPN); L 0-3	Did Not Advance								65
Karoline Mischek	Women's Singles	Betty Guo (CAN); W 3-1	Kavindi Rukmali Sahabandu (SRI); W 3-2	—N/a		Judith Liu (FRA); L 2-4	Did Not Advance					33
Anna Pfeffer	Women's Singles	Michelle Xin-Ro Liaw (CAN); L 0-3	Ida Jazbec (CRO); L 0-3	Did Not Advance								33
Diendorfer; Mischek	Women's Doubles	—N/a				Pitigala/ Sahabandu (SRI); W 3-0	Kim/Kim (KOR); L 1-3	Did Not Advance				17
Diendorfer; Mischek; Pfeffer	Women's Team	Philippines (PHI); W 3-0	Romania (ROU); W 3-0	Nigeria (NGR); W 3-0	—N/a			Poland (POL); L 0-3	Did Not Advance			9
Chen; Diendorfer	Mixed Doubles	—N/a			Bye	Tan/Lim (SGP); W 3-2	Liao/Chen (TPE); L 0-3	Did Not Advance				17
Pfeffer; Mischek	Mixed Doubles	—N/a			Bye	Moya Maureira/ Morales Escobar (CHI); W 3-0	Dalgleish/King (GBR); W 3-1	Yoshimura/Ando (JPN); L 0-3	Did Not Advance			9

== Tennis ==
Athlete	Event	Round 1	Round 2	Round 3	Round 4	Quarterfinals	Semifinals	Final / BM	
Athlete	Event	Opposition Score	Opposition Score	Opposition Score	Opposition Score	Opposition Score	Opposition Score	Opposition Score	Rank
Patrick Thomas Ofner	Men's Singles	Bye	Franco Daniel Tamagnone (ARG); W 2-1	Piotr Matuszewski (POL); W 2-0	Denis Yevseyev (KAZ); L 0-2	Did Not Advance			9
Kerstin Peckl	Women's Singles	Bye	Heilencia Van Zyl (RSA); W 2-1	P. Cheapchandej (THA); L 0-2	Did Not Advance				17
Patrick Thomas Ofner; Kerstin Peckl	Mixed Doubles	Bye	Kadchapanan/ Jundakate (THA); L 0-2	Did Not Advance					17
