= Roller Sports at the 2017 Summer Universiade – Women's 3000 metres relay =

Men's 3000 metres relay at the XXIX Summer Universiade
- Venues: Yingfeng Riverside Park Roller Sports Rink (A)
- Dates: 23 August
- Competitors: 30 from 8 nations

Medalists
1st place, gold medalist(s)		Chen Ying-chu; Li Meng-chu; Tsai Pin-hsuan; Yang Ho-chen	Chinese Taipei
2nd place, silver medalist(s)		An Yi-seul; Park Min-jeong; Shin So-yeong; Yu Ga-ram	South Korea
3rd place, bronze medalist(s)		Karen Dayanna Restrepo Rengifo; Maria Camila Gil Taborda; Maria Camila Guerra Guevara; Mayerly Amaya Villamizar	Colombia

The women's 3000 metres relay event at the 2017 Summer Universiade was held on 23 August at the Yingfeng Riverside Park Roller Sports Rink (A).

== Results ==
=== Preliminary Round ===
Rank	Heat	Team	Time	Results
1	2	South Korea (KOR)	4:25.845	Q
2	2	Colombia (COL)	4:26.504	Q
3	2	Hungary (HUN)	4:29.067	Q
4	2	Switzerland (SUI)	4:29.534	
5	1	Chinese Taipei (TPE)	4:37.467	Q
6	1	Italy (ITA)	4:38.941	Q
7	1	Japan (JPN)	4:39.891	Q
	1	Russia (RUS)	DSQ	

=== Finals ===
Rank	Team	Results
1st place, gold medalist(s)	Chinese Taipei (TPE)	4:25.026
2nd place, silver medalist(s)	South Korea (KOR)	4:25.565
3rd place, bronze medalist(s)	Colombia (COL)	4:28.157
4	Italy (ITA)	4:31.578
5	Hungary (HUN)	4:32.125
6	Japan (JPN)	DSQ
