= Weightlifting at the 2017 Summer Universiade =

Sport at the Summer Universiade

Weightlifting at the XXIX Summer Universiade
- Venues: Tamkang University Shao-Mo Memorial Gymnasium 7F
- Dates: August 20, 2017 – August 25, 2017
- Competitors: 290 from 53 nations

Weightlifting was contested at the 2017 Summer Universiade from August 20 to 25 at the Tamkang University Shao-Mo Memorial Gymnasium 7F in New Taipei, Taiwan.

== Participating nations ==
- Armenia (3)
- Australia (5)
- Azerbaijan (2)
- Belarus (3)
- Belgium (1)
- Brazil (5)
- Canada (15)
- China (7)
- Chinese Taipei (16) (host)
- Colombia (3)
- Czech Republic (5)
- Denmark (11)
- Dominican Republic (3)
- Estonia (1)
- Finland (3)
- France (1)
- Germany (3)
- Great Britain (2)
- India (3)
- Indonesia (9)
- Iran (7)
- Israel (1)
- Japan (12)
- Kazakhstan (11)
- Lithuania (6)
- Malta (1)
- Mexico (9)
- Moldova (3)
- Mongolia (3)
- Nepal (2)
- New Zealand (5)
- North Korea (11)
- Pakistan (5)
- Peru (2)
- Philippines (4)
- Poland (6)
- Romania (6)
- Russia (16)
- Serbia (1)
- Singapore (3)
- Slovakia (2)
- Slovenia (2)
- South Korea (10)
- Sri Lanka (6)
- Sweden (5)
- Switzerland (3)
- Syria (1)
- Thailand (8)
- Turkey (6)
- Turkmenistan (3)
- Ukraine (10)
- United States (16)
- Uzbekistan (3)

== Medal summary ==
=== Medal table ===
Rank	Nation	Gold	Silver	Bronze	Total
1	North Korea	7	1	2	10
2	Kazakhstan	3	2	1	6
3	Chinese Taipei*	2	1	4	7
4	Armenia	2	1	0	3
5	Russia	1	4	0	5
6	Ukraine	1	0	0	1
7	Thailand	0	2	2	4
8	Dominican Republic	0	2	0	2
9	Belarus	0	1	0	1
9	China	0	1	0	1
9	Mexico	0	1	0	1
12	South Korea	0	0	2	2
13	Canada	0	0	1	1
13	Great Britain	0	0	1	1
13	Indonesia	0	0	1	1
13	Iran	0	0	1	1
13	Japan	0	0	1	1
Totals (17 entries)		16	16	16	48

=== Men's events ===
Event	Gold		Silver		Bronze	
56 kg	Om Yun-chol; North Korea	294 UR	Luis García; Dominican Republic	263	Arli Chontey; Kazakhstan	258
62 kg	Sin Chol-bom; North Korea	303	Antonio Vázquez; Mexico	290	Kao Chan-Hung; Chinese Taipei	289
69 kg	Albert Linder; Kazakhstan	333 UR	Kim Myong-hyok; North Korea	331	Masanori Miyamoto; Japan	324
77 kg	Aidar Kazov; Kazakhstan	331	Viacheslav Iarkin; Russia	330	Alex Bellemarre; Canada	316
85 kg	Denis Ulanov; Kazakhstan	365	Andranik Karapetyan; Armenia	364	Jang Yeon-hak; South Korea	354
94 kg	Egor Klimonov; Russia	383	Rustem Sybay; Kazakhstan	382	Sarat Sumpradit; Thailand	381
105 kg	Simon Martirosyan; Armenia	401	Rodion Bochkov; Russia	390	Kia Ghadami; Iran	381
+105 kg	Gor Minasyan; Armenia	430	Chen Shih-chieh; Chinese Taipei	415	Hwang Woo-man; South Korea	399

=== Women's events ===
Event	Gold		Silver		Bronze	
48 kg	Ri Song-gum; North Korea	193 UR	Beatriz Pirón; Dominican Republic	188	Sri Wahyuni Agustiani; Indonesia	177
53 kg	Ri Su-yon; North Korea	208	Liu Feng; China	207	Supattra Kaewkhong; Thailand	197
58 kg	Kuo Hsing-chun; Chinese Taipei	249 UR WR	Sukanya Srisurat; Thailand	221	Kim Chung-sim; North Korea	217
63 kg	Rim Un-sim; North Korea	236 UR	Tima Turieva; Russia	226	Chiang Nien-hsin; Chinese Taipei	223
69 kg	Hung Wan-ting; Chinese Taipei	227	Karina Goricheva; Kazakhstan	226	Jong Chun-hui; North Korea	218
75 kg	Rim Jong-sim; North Korea	260	Darya Naumava; Belarus	240	Yao Chi-ling; Chinese Taipei	236
90 kg	Iryna Dekha; Ukraine	246 UR	Diana Mstieva; Russia	242	Lo Ying-yuan; Chinese Taipei	235
+90 kg	Kim Kuk-hyang; North Korea	299	Chitchanok Pulsabsakul; Thailand	270	Mercy Brown; Great Britain	234
