= Pakistan at the 2017 Summer Universiade =

- IOC code: PAK
- NOC: Pakistan Olympic Association

in Taipei July 19-30
- Competitors: 22 (15 men & 7 women) in 12 sports
- Medals: Gold 0 Silver 0 Bronze 0 Total 0

Summer Universiade appearances
- 1959; 1961; 1963; 1965; 1967; 1970; 1973; 1975; 1977; 1979; 1981; 1983; 1985; 1987; 1989; 1991; 1993; 1995; 1997; 1999; 2001; 2003; 2005; 2007; 2009; 2011; 2013; 2015; 2017; 2019; 2021

Pakistan participated at the 2017 Summer Universiade which was held in Taipei, Taiwan.

Pakistan sent a delegation consisting of 22 competitors for the event competing in 5 sporting events. Pakistan did not win any medals at the multi-sport event.

== Participants ==
Sport	Men	Women	Total
Athletics	2	2	4
Badminton	3	0	3
Judo	3	3	6
Taekwondo	2	2	4
Weightlifting	5	0	5
