= E. Jacquelin Dietz =

American statistician (1951–2020)

- Born: 1951
- Died: 2020 (aged 68–69)

E. Jacquelin Dietz (1951–2020) was an American statistician, interested in nonparametric and multivariate statistics and in statistics education. She was a professor at North Carolina State University until 2004, when she moved to Meredith College. At Meredith, she was head of the mathematics and computer science department for five years, from approximately 2007 to 2012, and taught statistics for 10 years. Dietz was the founding editor-in-chief of Journal of Statistics Education.

== Education and career ==
Dietz graduated from Oberlin College in 1973, majoring in mathematics and psychobiology, a subject she added to her mathematics courses in order to make her studies less theoretical and more relevant. She entered graduate study at the University of Connecticut in biobehavioral science, but after taking a required statistics course switched to that subject, and completed a master's degree and a Ph.D. in 1975 and 1978 respectively. Her dissertation, supervised by Timothy John Killeen, was Bivariate Nonparametric Tests for the One-Sample Location Problem.

== Contributions to statistics education ==
Dietz's first scholarly publication in statistics education was in 1989. She founded the Journal of Statistics Education in 1992, and shepherded it into becoming an official publication of the American Statistical Association beginning in 1999; she remained as its editor until 2000.

== Recognition ==
Dietz was elected as a Fellow of the American Statistical Association in 1996. She was also a winner of the American Statistical Association Founders Award.
