= Journal of Statistics and Data Science Education =

- Discipline: Education
- Language: English
- Edited by: Nicholas Horton

Publication details
- Former name: Journal of Statistics Education
- History: 1993–present
- Publisher: Taylor & Francis on behalf of the American Statistical Association (United States)
- Frequency: Triannual
- Open access: Yes
- Impact factor: 1.7 (2022)

Standard abbreviations
- ISO 4: J. Stat. Data Sci. Educ.

Indexing
- ISSN: 1069-1898 (print); 2693-9169 (web)
- LCCN: 2020203072
- OCLC no.: 1056138652

Links
- Journal homepage; Online access; Online archive

The Journal of Statistics and Data Science Education is a triannual open access peer-reviewed academic journal. It was established in 1992 at North Carolina State University by E. Jacquelin Dietz as the Journal of Statistics Education, obtaining its current title in 2020. It is published by Taylor & Francis on behalf of the American Statistical Association of which it became an official publication in 1999. The journal covers subjects related to statistical literacy and statistics education at all levels of education.
