= Gergely Madarász =

Hungarian tennis player

- Country (sports): Hungary
- Born: 1 October 1994 (age 32) Baja, Hungary
- Plays: Left-handed (two-handed backhand)
- College: Purdue
- Prize money: $65,493

Singles
- Career record: 0–0 (at ATP Tour level, Grand Slam level)
- Career titles: 5 ITF
- Highest ranking: No. 441 (1 August 2022)
- Current ranking: No. 1,015 (24 November 2025)

Doubles
- Career record: 0–0 (at ATP Tour level, Grand Slam level)
- Career titles: 7 ITF
- Highest ranking: No. 630 (27 December 2021)
- Current ranking: No. 1,008 (24 November 2025)

Team competitions
- Davis Cup: 3–0
- Last updated on: 30 November 2025.

Gergely Madarász (born 1 October 1994) is a Hungarian tennis player.

Madarász has a career high ATP singles ranking of No. 441 achieved on 1 August 2022 and a career high ATP doubles ranking of No. 630 achieved on 27 December 2021. Madarász has won 1 ITF singles and 2 doubles title.

Madarász has represented Hungary at Davis Cup, where he has a win–loss record of 3–0.

He was studied at Purdue University, between 2014 and 2018. He competed at the 2017 Summer Universiade. In singles Madarász lost against Indian Paras Dahiya, in doubles with Barnabás Koncz defeated on the second round by the Japanese Shintaro Imai and Kaito Uesugi.

== Challenger and Futures/World Tennis Tour Finals ==
=== Singles: 10 (5–5) ===
Legend (singles) ATP Challenger Tour (0–0) ITF Futures/World Tennis Tour (5–5)	Titles by surface Hard (0–0) Clay (5-5) Grass (0–0) Carpet (0–0)

Result	W–L	Date	Tournament	Tier	Surface	Opponent	Score
Win	1–0	Aug 2013	Serbia F7, Sombor	Futures	Clay	(Serbia) Dejan Katić	6–3, 5–7, 7–5
Loss	1–1	Jun 2014	Hungary F2, Siófok	Futures	Clay	(Russia) Kirill Dmitriev	6–3, 3–6, 1–6
Loss	1–2	Jun 2019	M15 Balatonalmádi, Hungary	World Tennis Tour	Clay	(Australia) Christopher O'Connell	3–6, 1–6
Win	2–2	Sep 2021	M15 Ulcinj, Montenegro	World Tennis Tour	Clay	(Argentina) Juan Pablo Paz	4–6, 6–1, 6–3
Win	3–2	Sep 2021	M15 Vyshkovo, Ukraine	World Tennis Tour	Clay	(Russia) Ivan Nedelko	7–6^{(7–1)}, 3–6, 6–4
Win	4–2	Apr 2022	M15 Dubrovnik, Croatia	World Tennis Tour	Clay	(Croatia) Dino Prižmić	6–2, 6–0
Win	5–2	May 2022	M15 Doboj, Bosnia and Herzegovina	World Tennis Tour	Clay	(Japan) Rimpei Kawakami	6–3, 7–5
Loss	5–3	Jan 2023	M15 Antalya, Turkey	World Tennis Tour	Clay	(Argentina) Alex Barrena	3–6, 2–6
Loss	5–4	Mar 2024	M15 Kish Island, Iran	World Tennis Tour	Clay	(Romania) Filip Cristian Jianu	2–6, 3–6
Loss	5–5	Oct 2024	M15 Tsaghkadzor, Armenia	World Tennis Tour	Clay	(Argentina) Juan Pablo Paz	3–6, 4–6

=== Doubles 12 (7–5) ===
Legend
ATP Challengers 0 (0–0)
ITF Futures/World Tennis Tour 10 (7–5)

Outcome	W–L	Date	Tournament	Tier	Surface	Partner	Opponents	Score
Loss	0–1	Sep 2013	Serbia F12, Subotica	Futures	Clay	(Hungary) Péter Balla	(Slovakia) Adrian Partl (Czech Republic) Dominik Süč	6–7^{(5–7)}, 7–6^{(7–3)}, [1–10]
Loss	0–2	May 2018	Hungary F2, Zalaegerszeg	Futures	Clay	(Hungary) Péter Balla	(Romania) Andrei Ștefan Apostol (Romania) Nicolae Frunză	5–7, 4–6
Loss	0–3	Sep 2019	M15 Zlatibor, Serbia	World Tennis Tour	Clay	(Hungary) Mátyás Füle	(Montenegro) Ljubomir Čelebić (Bosnia and Herzegovina) Nemanja Malešević	3–6, 6–3, [4–10]
Win	1–3	Sep 2019	M15 Chornomorsk, Ukraine	World Tennis Tour	Clay	(Hungary) Mátyás Füle	(Ukraine) Dmytro Kamynin (Ukraine) Nikita Mashtakov	4–6, 6–2, [13–11]
Win	2–3	Jan 2020	M15 Cairo, Egypt	World Tennis Tour	Clay	(Croatia) Duje Kekez	(Germany) Luca Gelhardt (Czech Republic) Petr Hájek	6–1, 6–2
Loss	2–4	Mar 2021	M15 Poreč, Croatia	World Tennis Tour	Clay	(Hungary) Péter Nagy	(Italy) Marco Bortolotti (Italy) Giovanni Fonio	2–6, 2–6
Loss	2–5	Sep 2021	M15 Zlatibor, Serbia	World Tennis Tour	Clay	(Hungary) Péter Nagy	(Russia) Yan Bondarevskiy (Ukraine) Oleg Prihodko	6–1, 0–6, [7–10]
Win	3–5	Oct 2021	M15 Antalya, Turkey	World Tennis Tour	Clay	(Poland) Daniel Michalski	(Romania) Mircea-Alexandru Jecan (Romania) Dan Alexandru Tomescu	6–4, 6–3
Win	4–5	Oct 2021	M15 Antalya, Turkey	World Tennis Tour	Clay	(Hungary) Péter Nagy	(Argentina) Santiago de la Fuente (Argentina) Juan Pablo Paz	6–2, 6–4
Win	5–5	Nov 2021	M15 Antalya, Turkey	World Tennis Tour	Clay	(Hungary) Péter Nagy	(Russia) Danil Spasibo (Russia) Pavel Verbin	6–2, 6–2
Win	6–5	Mar 2023	M15 Kish Island, Iran	World Tennis Tour	Clay	(Hungary) Mátyás Füle	Egor Agafonov; Vladislav Ivanov	6–3, 6–3
Win	7–5	Jan 2024	M15 Kish Island, Iran	World Tennis Tour	Clay	(Hungary) Mátyás Füle	(Iran) Samyar Elyasi (Iran) Hamidreza Nadaf	6–4, 7–5

== Davis Cup ==
=== Participations: (3–0) ===
Group membership World Group (0–0) WG Play-off (0–0) Group I (0–0) Group II (0–0) Group III (3–0) Group IV (0–0)	Matches by surface Hard (0–0) Clay (3–0) Grass (0–0) Carpet (0–0)	Matches by type Singles (3–0) Doubles (0–0)

- ▲ ▼ indicates the outcome of the Davis Cup match followed by the score, date, place of event, the zonal classification and its phase, and the court surface.

Rubber outcome	No.	Rubber	Match type (partner if any)	Opponent nation	Opponent player(s)	Score
▲3–0; 7 May 2014; Gellért Szabadidőközpont, Szeged, Hungary; Europe/Africa Round Robin; Clay surface
Victory	1	I	Singles	Armenia	Ashot Gevorgyan	6–0, 6–3
▲3–0; 8 May 2014; Gellért Szabadidőközpont, Szeged, Hungary; Europe/Africa Round Robin; Clay surface
Victory	2	I	Singles	Liechtenstein	Timo Kranz	6–3, 6–1
▲2–0; 10 May 2014; Gellért Szabadidőközpont, Szeged, Hungary; Europe/Africa Promotional Play off; Clay surface
Victory	3	I	Singles	(Georgia (country)) Georgia	George Tsivadze	7–5, 6–0

== Record against other players ==
Madarász's match record against players who have been ranked in the top 100, with those who are active in boldface.
ATP Tour, Challenger and Future tournaments' main draw and qualifying matches are considered.

Opponent	Highest ranking	Matches	Won	Lost	Win %	Last match
(Argentina) **Sebastián Báez**	31	1	0	1	0%	Lost (6–7^{(4–7)}, 4–6) at 2020 M15 Spain 1R
(Chile) **Nicolás Jarry**	38	1	0	1	0%	Lost (3–6, 4–6) at 2014 Serbia F3 1R
(Hungary) **Attila Balázs**	76	1	0	1	0%	Lost (1–6, 2–6) at 2013 Croatia F9 1R
(Australia) **Christopher O'Connell**	78	1	0	1	0%	Lost (3–6, 4–6) at 2019 M15 Hungary F
Total		4	0	4	0%	* Statistics correct as of 9 January 2023
