= Nicholas Horton =

American statistics professor

Nicholas (Nick) Horton is an American statistics professor and author. He is the Beitzel Professor in Technology and Society at Amherst College. In 2022, he began a 3-year term as the vice president of the American Statistical Association.

== Education ==
Horton completed his A.B. at Harvard College and his Sc.D. at the Harvard School of Public Health.

== Work ==
Horton has written multiple books focusing on R and SAS. He is also an author in the fields of statistics education and missing data. He is one of the authors of the GAISE guidelines. With Ben Baumer and Daniel Kaplan, he is the author of Modern Data Science with R. Other notable works include:

- Normal Sexual Dimorphism of the Adult Human Brain Assessed by In Vivo Magnetic Resonance Imaging
- Much ado about nothing: A comparison of missing data methods and software to fit incomplete data regression models

He is an editor for the Journal of Statistics and Data Science Education (JSDSE).

== Awards ==
Fellow of the American Statistical Association.

Fellow of the American Association for the Advancement of Science.

== Personal life ==
Horton resides in Northampton, Massachusetts with his wife, Julia Riseman. The two are advocates for bicycle trails.
