= Richard Muzaev =

Russian tennis player (born 1992)

Richard Muzaev Ричард Музаев
- Country (sports): Russia
- Residence: Moscow, Russia
- Born: 21 March 1992 (age 33) Vladikavkaz, Russia
- Height: 1.78 m (5 ft 10 in)
- Plays: Right-handed (two handed-backhand)
- Prize money: $63,239

Singles
- Career record: 0–0 (at ATP Tour level, Grand Slam level, and in Davis Cup)
- Career titles: 2 ITF
- Highest ranking: No. 560 (20 October 2014)

Grand Slam singles results
- Australian Open Junior: 1R (2010)

Doubles
- Career record: 0–0 (at ATP Tour level, Grand Slam level, and in Davis Cup)
- Career titles: 6 ITF
- Highest ranking: No. 443 (16 February 2015)

Grand Slam doubles results
- Australian Open Junior: QF (2010)
Medal record
Representing Russia
Men's Tennis
Summer Universiade
Gold medal – first place	2017 Taipei	Men's Doubles
Bronze medal – third place	2017 Taipei	Men's Team

Richard Gayozovich Muzaev (Russian: Ричард Гайозович Музаев; born 21 March 1992) is a Russian tennis player.

== Career ==
Muzaev has a career high ATP singles ranking of No. 560 achieved on 20 October 2014 and a career high ATP doubles ranking of No. 443 achieved on 16 February 2015. He has won two ITF singles titles and six ITF doubles titles.

Muzaev made his ATP main draw debut at the 2015 Kremlin Cup where he received entry to the doubles main draw as a wildcard entrant, partnering Anton Zaitcev.
