= Colombia at the 2017 Summer Universiade =

- IOC code: COL
- NOC: Colombian Olympic Committee
- Website: www.coc.org.co

in Taipei, Taiwan 19 – 30 August 2017
- Competitors: 81 in 11 sports
- Medals Ranked 33rd: Gold 1 Silver 3 Bronze 7 Total 11

Summer Universiade appearances
- 1959; 1961; 1963; 1965; 1967; 1970; 1973; 1975; 1977; 1979; 1981; 1983; 1985; 1987; 1989; 1991; 1993; 1995; 1997; 1999; 2001; 2003; 2005; 2007; 2009; 2011; 2013; 2015; 2017; 2019; 2021

Colombia participated at the 2017 Summer Universiade, in Taipei, Taiwan with 81 competitors in 11 sports.

== Competitors ==
The following table lists Colombia's delegation per sport and gender.

| Sport | Men | Women | Total |
|---|---|---|---|
| Athletics | 5 | 6 | 11 |
| Football | 0 | 14 | 14 |
| Golf | 1 | 0 | 1 |
| Judo | 2 | 1 | 3 |
| Roller Sports | 5 | 6 | 11 |
| Swimming | 3 | 7 | 10 |
| Table Tennis | 3 | 0 | 3 |
| Taekwondo | 5 | 3 | 8 |
| Tennis | 2 | 3 | 5 |
| Volleyball | 0 | 12 | 12 |
| Weightlifting | 0 | 3 | 3 |
| Total | 26 | 55 | 81 |

== Medal summary ==
Medals by sport
| Sport | 1st place, gold medalist(s) | 2nd place, silver medalist(s) | 3rd place, bronze medalist(s) | Total |
|---|---|---|---|---|
| Roller Sports | 1 | 3 | 7 | 11 |
| Total | 1 | 3 | 7 | 11 |

== Athletics ==
=== Track Events ===
| Athlete | Event | Round 1 | | Round 2 | | Semifinal | | Final | |
| Athlete | Event | Result | Rank | Result | Rank | Result | Rank | Result | Rank |
|---|---|---|---|---|---|---|---|---|---|
| Nelson Andres Blanco Pilonieta | Men's 3000m Steeplechase | — | | | | | | 9:03.24 | 14 |
| Eliana Chavez | Women's 400m | 55.18 | 3Q | — | | 57.05 | 8 | did not advance | |
| Victor Manuel Leon Delgado | Men's 1500m | 4:09.90 | 13 | — | | | | did not advance | |
| Victor Manuel Leon Delgado | Men's 5000m | 15:49.76 | 13 | — | | | | did not advance | |
| Victor Manuel Leon Delgado | Men's Half Marathon | — | | | | | | 1:22:08 | 39 |
| Sergio Alejandro Lopez Rodriguez | Men's 10000m | — | | | | | | 32:44.00 | 14 |
| Sergio Alejandro Lopez Rodriguez | Men's Half Marathon | — | | | | | | 1:11:14 | 16 |
| Carolina Marino Fonseca | Women's 20 km Walk | — | | | | | | 1:53:39 | 14 |
| Lina Maritza Pantoja Hidalgo | Women's 10000m | — | | | | | | DNS | — |
| Oscar Andres Romero Roa | Men's 1500m | 4:00.41 | 13 | — | | | | did not advance | |
| Oscar Andres Romero Roa | Men's 800m | 1:58.40 | 5 | — | | did not advance | | | |

=== Field Events ===
| Athlete | Event | Qualification | | Final | |
| Athlete | Event | Distance | Position | Distance | Position |
|---|---|---|---|---|---|
| Daniel Felipe Aguirre Vanegas | Men's Hammer | 61.32 | 9Q | 59.96 | 14 |
| Maria Alejandra Beltran Moya | Women's Hammer | NM | — | did not advance | |
| Mayra Gaviria | Women's Hammer | NM | — | did not advance | |
| Nhayilla Rentería | Women's Triple Jump | 12.99 | 4q | 12.83 | 9 |

== Football ==
=== Women's tournament ===
Group Stage

| Team | Pld | W | D | L | GF | GA | GD | Pts |
|---|---|---|---|---|---|---|---|---|
| Brazil | 2 | 2 | 0 | 0 | 20 | 1 | +19 | 6 |
| Japan | 2 | 1 | 0 | 1 | 15 | 3 | +12 | 3 |
| Colombia | 2 | 0 | 0 | 2 | 0 | 31 | −31 | 0 |

18 August 2017
16:00

| Brazil | 17–0 | Colombia |
|---|---|---|
| De Oliveira 10', 15', 35'; Pereira Nunes 12', 18', 33', 76'; Locatelli 29'; Martins Xavier 31'; Lemos Ramos 37'; Ferreira Leite 43'; Batista da Costa 50'; Rafagnin Calderan 60'; Cadorini Fabem 61', 80', 82', 84' | Report |

Chang Gung University Stadium, Taoyuan City
Referee: Lee Yi Chi (Chinese Taipei)

20 August 2017
19:30

| Japan | 14–0 | Colombia |
|---|---|---|
| Otake 5', 48', 52'; Kumagai 16'; Horie 27', 50'; Miura 54'; Nakamura 56'; Matsubara 67'; Kawano 78', 79', 90+5'; Hirakuni 81'; De La Hoz 89' (o.g.) | Report |

Chang Gung University Stadium, Taoyuan City
Referee: Thein Thein Aye (Myanmar)

9th-12th place semifinals

26 August 2017
16:00

| Great Britain | 7–1 | Colombia |
|---|---|---|
| Quinn 17', 33'; Dixon 19', 78'; Torres Roja 25' (o.g.); Johnson 62'; Lord-Mears 71' | Report | Torres Roja 47' |

Fu Jen Catholic University Stadium, New Taipei City
Referee: Lee Yi-chi (Chinese Taipei)

11th place match

28 August 2017
16:00

| Chinese Taipei | 5–0 | Colombia |
|---|---|---|
| Yu 45' (pen.); Ting 45+2', 52'; Lo 62'; Lin 71' | Report |

Hsinchu County Second Stadium, Hsinchu County
Referee: Thein Thein Aye (Myanmar)

== Golf ==
| Athlete | Event | Round 1 | Round 2 | Round 3 | Total | |
| Athlete | Event | Score | Score | Score | Score | Rank |
|---|---|---|---|---|---|---|
| David Martinez Carrillo | Men's Individual | 89 | 95 | 99 | DSQ | 67 |

== Judo ==
| Athlete | Event | Round of 64 | Round of 32 | Round of 16 | Quarterfinals | Repechage 32 | Repechage 16 | Repechage 8 | Final Repechage | Semifinals | Final / BM | |
| Athlete | Event | Opposition Result | Opposition Result | Opposition Result | Opposition Result | Opposition Result | Opposition Result | Opposition Result | Opposition Result | Opposition Result | Opposition Result | Rank |
|---|---|---|---|---|---|---|---|---|---|---|---|---|
| David Bahamon Pinzon | Men's -90 kg | Bye | Firudin Dadashov (AZE); L 00-10 | did not advance | | | | | | | | N/A |
| Juan Carlos Bahamon Pinzon | Men's -81 kg | Bye | Filips Mikuckis (LAT); L 00S1-12 | did not advance | | | | | | | | N/A |
| Katerin Johana Marin Florez | Women's -78 kg | — | Bye | Kendra Ann Kehrli (LAT); W 13-00 | Aleksandra Babintseva (RUS); L 00S1-11 | — | | Paula Weronika Kulaga (POL); L 00-11 | did not advance | | | N/A |

== Roller Sports ==
=== Men ===
| Athlete | Event | Preliminary | | Semifinal | | Final | |
| Athlete | Event | Time | Rank | Time | Rank | Time/Points | Rank |
|---|---|---|---|---|---|---|---|
| Johan Sebastian Cabrera Orjuela | 1000m Sprint | — | | 1:26.897 | 3 | did not advance | |
| Johan Sebastian Cabrera Orjuela | Speed Slalom | DSQ | 11 | did not advance | | | |
| Johan Sebastian Cabrera Orjuela | Marathon | — | | | | DNF | — |
| Carlos Ivan Franco Perez | 10000m Points-Elimination | — | | | | 2 | 6 |
| Carlos Ivan Franco Perez | 15000m Elimination | — | | | | 24:09.630 | 1st place, gold medalist(s) |
| Carlos Ivan Franco Perez | Marathon | — | | | | 1:07:15.243 | 4 |
| Cesar Enrique Nunez Almanza | 300m Time Trial | 24.580 | 3q | — | | 24.504 | 4 |
| Cesar Enrique Nunez Almanza | 500m Sprint | 41.838 | 1Q | 40.049 | 1Q | 39.959 | 2nd place, silver medalist(s) |
| Cesar Enrique Nunez Almanza | Speed Slalom | DSQ | 11 | did not advance | | | |
| Cesar Enrique Nunez Almanza | Marathon | — | | | | DNF | — |
| Carlos Esteban Perez Canaval | 10000m Points-Elimination | — | | | | 10 | 3rd place, bronze medalist(s) |
| Carlos Esteban Perez Canaval | 1000m Sprint | — | | 1:23.836 | 1Q | 1:29.708 | 8 |
| Carlos Esteban Perez Canaval | 15000m Elimination | — | | | | 24:09.999 | 3rd place, bronze medalist(s) |
| Carlos Esteban Perez Canaval | Marathon | — | | | | 1:07:15.163 | 2nd place, silver medalist(s) |
| Jaime Rodrigo Uribe Mogollon | 300m Time Trial | 24.849 | 5q | — | | 24.966 | 6 |
| Jaime Rodrigo Uribe Mogollon | 500m Sprint | 40.563 | 1Q | 41.354 | 1Q | 40.033 | 3rd place, bronze medalist(s) |
| Jaime Rodrigo Uribe Mogollon | Marathon | — | | | | DNF | — |
| Cabrera Orjuela; Perez Canaval; Franco Perez; Nunez Almanza | 3000m Relay | 4:06.653 | 2Q | — | | 4:04.512 | 3rd place, bronze medalist(s) |

=== Women ===
| Athlete | Event | Preliminary | | Semifinal | | Final | |
| Athlete | Event | Time | Rank | Time | Rank | Time/Points | Rank |
|---|---|---|---|---|---|---|---|
| Mayerly Amaya Villamizar | 1000m Sprint | — | | 1:33.896 | 2 | did not advance | |
| Mayerly Amaya Villamizar | 500m Sprint | 43.514 | 3 | did not advance | | | |
| Mayerly Amaya Villamizar | Speed Slalom | DSQ | — | did not advance | | | |
| Mayerly Amaya Villamizar | Marathon | — | | | | 1:28:15.845 | 24 |
| Maria Camila Gil Taborda | 15000m Elimination | — | | | | 26:58.964 | 3rd place, bronze medalist(s) |
| Maria Camila Gil Taborda | Marathon | — | | | | 1:27:46.231 | 12 |
| Maria Camila Guerra Guevara | 10000m Points-Elimination | — | | | | 1 | 7 |
| Maria Camila Guerra Guevara | Marathon | — | | | | 1:27:44.399 | 3rd place, bronze medalist(s) |
| Daniela Andrea Lindarte Garaviz | 10000m Points-Elimination | — | | | | 8 | 4 |
| Daniela Andrea Lindarte Garaviz | 15000m Elimination | — | | | | 26:59.051 | 4 |
| Daniela Andrea Lindarte Garaviz | Marathon | — | | | | 1:27:46.001 | 10 |
| Karen Dayanna Restrepo Rengifo | 300m Time Trial | 27.551 | 6q | — | | 27.415 | 6 |
| Karen Dayanna Restrepo Rengifo | 1000m Sprint | — | | 1:33.918 | 3 | did not advance | |
| Karen Dayanna Restrepo Rengifo | Marathon | — | | | | DNF | — |
| María Fernanda Timms | 300m Time Trial | 27.228 | 5q | — | | 27.244 | 5 |
| María Fernanda Timms | 500m Sprint | 45.369 | 2Q | 44.418 | 2Q | 43.802 | 2nd place, silver medalist(s) |
| María Fernanda Timms | Speed Slalom | DSQ | — | did not advance | | | |
| María Fernanda Timms | Marathon | — | | | | DNF | — |
| Restrepo Rengifo; Gil Taborda; Amaya Villamizar; Guerra Guevara | 3000m Relay | 4:26.504 | 2Q | — | | 4:28.157 | 3rd place, bronze medalist(s) |

== Swimming ==
=== Men ===
| Athlete | Event | Heat | | Semifinal | | Final | |
| Athlete | Event | Time | Rank | Time | Rank | Time | Rank |
|---|---|---|---|---|---|---|---|
| David Arias | 50m Butterfly | 25.07 | 7 | did not advance | | | |
| David Arias | 200m Butterfly | 2:03.66 | 8 | did not advance | | | |
| David Arias | 100m Butterfly | 55.22 | 8 | did not advance | | | |
| David Céspedes | 100m Backstroke | 57.66 | 7 | did not advance | | | |
| David Céspedes | 50m Backstroke | 26.73 | 6 | did not advance | | | |
| David Céspedes | 200m Backstroke | 2:05.82 | 8 | did not advance | | | |
| Jorge Murillo | 100 Breaststroke | 1:01.70 | 3 | did not advance | | | |
| Jorge Murillo | 200 Breaststroke | 2:19.52 | 7 | did not advance | | | |
| Jorge Murillo | 50 Breaststroke | 28.01 | 3 | 27.86 | 6 | did not advance | |

=== Women ===
| Athlete | Event | Heat | | Semifinal | | Final | |
| Athlete | Event | Time | Rank | Time | Rank | Time | Rank |
|---|---|---|---|---|---|---|---|
| Laura Daniela Abril Lizarazo | 400m Individual Medley | 5:25.04 | 5 | — | | did not advance | |
| Laura Daniela Abril Lizarazo | 200m Individual Medley | 2:32.17 | 3 | did not advance | | | |
| Laura Daniela Abril Lizarazo | 800m Freestyle | 9:31.18 | 7 | — | | did not advance | |
| Laura Daniela Abril Lizarazo | 400m Freestyle | 4:44.02 | 8 | — | | did not advance | |
| Karol Daniela Camayo Agredo | 200m Freestyle | 2:12.28 | 5 | did not advance | | | |
| Karol Daniela Camayo Agredo | 400m Freestyle | 4:44.00 | 7 | — | | did not advance | |
| Maria Paula Giraldo Ocampo | 100m Freestyle | 1:01.67 | 6 | did not advance | | | |
| Maria Paula Giraldo Ocampo | 200m Individual Medley | 2:35.88 | 5 | did not advance | | | |
| Maria Paula Giraldo Ocampo | 50m Freestyle | 28.58 | 7 | did not advance | | | |
| Raquel Emilia Lopez Zapata | 100 Backstroke | 1:16.65 | 4 | did not advance | | | |
| Raquel Emilia Lopez Zapata | 50 Backstroke | 34.31 | 8 | did not advance | | | |
| Maria Paola Munoz Munoz | 50m Butterfly | 28.83 | 2 | did not advance | | | |
| Maria Paola Munoz Munoz | 100m Freestyle | 59.10 | 6 | did not advance | | | |
| Maria Paola Munoz Munoz | 100m Butterfly | 1:04.16 | 5 | did not advance | | | |
| Maria Paola Munoz Munoz | 200m Freestyle | 2:07.86 | 7 | did not advance | | | |
| Maria Paola Munoz Munoz | 50m Freestyle | 27.53 | 6 | did not advance | | | |
| María Clara Quintero Sosa | 50m Butterfly | 29.79 | 2 | did not advance | | | |
| María Clara Quintero Sosa | 100 Backstroke | 1:09.15 | 8 | did not advance | | | |
| María Clara Quintero Sosa | 100m Butterfly | 1:06.48 | 2 | did not advance | | | |
| María Clara Quintero Sosa | 50 Backstroke | 32.31 | 5 | did not advance | | | |
| Salome Velez Catano | 100m Breaststroke | 1:15.62 | 7 | did not advance | | | |
| Salome Velez Catano | 200m Breaststroke | 2:45.63 | 5 | did not advance | | | |
| Salome Velez Catano | 50m Breaststroke | 35.24 | 8 | did not advance | | | |
| Salome Velez Catano | Quintero Sosa; Velez Catano; Munoz Munoz; Giraldo Ocampo | 4x100m Medley Relay | DNS | — | — | | did not advance |

== Table Tennis ==
| Athlete | Event | Group Stage | | | Round of 128 | Round of 64 | Round of 32 | Round of 16 | Quarterfinals | Semifinals | Final / BM | |
| Athlete | Event | Opposition Result | Opposition Result | Opposition Result | Opposition Result | Opposition Result | Opposition Result | Opposition Result | Opposition Result | Opposition Result | Opposition Result | Rank |
|---|---|---|---|---|---|---|---|---|---|---|---|---|
| Nelson Ivan Cardozo Perez | Men's Singles | Yugesh Chandra Rai (NEP); W 3-0 | Arun Subodh Rooparine (TTO); L 0-3 | — | | did not advance | | | | | | |
| Daniel Mauricio Pava Riano | Men's Singles | Sheung Hei Poon (HKG); L 0-3 | Simon Pfeffer (AUT); L 0-3 | — | | did not advance | | | | | | |
| Carlos Arturo Vergara Barraza | Men's Singles | Habib Antoun (LBN); L 0-3 | Lemuel Agbon (PHI); L 2-3 | Karan Rai (NEP); W 3-1 | — | did not advance | | | | | | |
| Pava Riano/Vergara Barraza | Men's Doubles | — | | | Bye | Gadiev/Gusev (RUS); L 0-3 | Did Not Advance | | | | | |
| Cardozo Perez; Pava Riano; Vergara Barraza | Men's Doubles | Men's Team | Czech Republic (CZE); L 0-3 | Singapore (SGP); L 0-3 | Chinese Taipei (TPE); L 0-3 | — | | | Did Not Advance | | | |

== Taekwondo ==
| Athlete | Event | Round of 64 | Round of 32 | Round of 16 | Quarterfinals | Semifinals | Final / BM | |
| Athlete | Event | Opposition Result | Opposition Result | Opposition Result | Opposition Result | Opposition Result | Opposition Result | Rank |
|---|---|---|---|---|---|---|---|---|
| Camilo Baena Tobon | Men's -80 kg | Bye | Khair El Din Faraj (RUS); W 25-3 | Raul Martinez Gomez (ESP); L 6-17 | Did Not Advance | | | |
| Jonathan Mauricio Castiblanco | Men's -68 kg | Temuujin Purejav (MGL); L 3-26 | Did Not Advance | | | | | |
| Diego Alexander Chavarria | Men's -87 kg | — | Rafael Kamalov (MGL); L 4-22 | Did Not Advance | | | | |
| Didier Alejandro Cuero | Men's -74 kg | Bye | Tsung-Yeh Yang (TPE); L 13-38 | Did Not Advance | | | | |
| Alvaro Nicolas Gomez Vasquez | Men's -63 kg | Gangmin Cho (KOR); L 25-28 | Did Not Advance | | | | | |
| Angie Paola Guiza Montoya | Women's -62 kg | — | Luciana Angiolillo (ARG); L 12-22 | Did Not Advance | | | | |
| Diana Camila Ibanez Espinel | Women's -73 kg | — | Julia Gabriela Herculano (BRA); L 4-25 | Did Not Advance | | | | |
| Diana Lizeth Rebolledo | Women's -67 kg | — | Julyana Al Sadeq (JOR); L WDR-0 | Did Not Advance | | | | |

== Tennis ==
| Athlete | Event | Round 1 | Round 2 | Round 3 | Round 4 | Quarterfinals | Semifinals | Final / BM | |
| Athlete | Event | Opposition Score | Opposition Score | Opposition Score | Opposition Score | Opposition Score | Opposition Score | Opposition Score | Rank |
|---|---|---|---|---|---|---|---|---|---|
| Juan Miguel Jaramillo | Men's Singles | Zaid Daher (JOR); W 2-0 | Shintaro Imai (JPN); L 0-2 | Did Not Advance | | | | | |
| Manuel Montoya | Men's Singles | Bye | Alessandro Ceppellini (ITA); L 0-2 | Did Not Advance | | | | | |
| Jaramillo; Montoya | Men's Doubles | Bonfre/Stjern (SWE); L 0-2 | Did Not Advance | | | | | | |
| Vilma Yaed Gomez | Women's Singles | Bye | Miriam Kolodziejova (CZE); L 0-2 | Did Not Advance | | | | | |
| Valentina Henao | Women's Singles | Lienke De Kock (RSA); L 0-2 | Did Not Advance | | | | | | |
| Samantha Palacio | Women's Singles | Judith Nalukwago (UGA); W 2-0 | Kai-Chen Chang (TPE); L 0-2 | Did Not Advance | | | | | |
| Henao/Palacio | Women's Doubles | Pivovarova/Doroshina (RUS); L 0-2 | Did Not Advance | | | | | | |
| Jaramillo/Gomez | Mixed Doubles | Bye | Zitnik/Brglez (SLO); L 0-2 | Did Not Advance | | | | | |

== Volleyball ==
=== Women's tournament ===
Group Stage

| Pos | Team | Pld | W | L | Pts | SW | SL | SR | SPW | SPL | SPR | Qualification |
|---|---|---|---|---|---|---|---|---|---|---|---|---|
| 1 | Chinese Taipei | 3 | 3 | 0 | 9 | 9 | 1 | 9.000 | 246 | 179 | 1.374 | Quarterfinals |
| 2 | France | 3 | 2 | 1 | 6 | 6 | 3 | 2.000 | 208 | 172 | 1.209 | Quarterfinals |
| 3 | Czech Republic | 3 | 1 | 2 | 3 | 4 | 7 | 0.571 | 221 | 251 | 0.880 | |
| 4 | Colombia | 3 | 0 | 3 | 0 | 1 | 9 | 0.111 | 175 | 248 | 0.706 | |

| Date | Time | | Score | | Set 1 | Set 2 | Set 3 | Set 4 | Set 5 | Total | Report |
|---|---|---|---|---|---|---|---|---|---|---|---|
| 21 Aug | 18:00 | Colombia | 1–3 | Czech Republic | 25–23 | 21–25 | 11–25 | 23–25 | | 80–98 | P2 P3 |
| 22 Aug | 15:00 | France | 3–0 | Colombia | 25–11 | 25–19 | 25–20 | | | 75–50 | P2 P3 |
| 23 Aug | 18:00 | Colombia | 0–3 | Chinese Taipei | 15–25 | 16–25 | 14–25 | | | 45–75 | P2 P3 |

9th-16th place quarterfinals

| Date | Time | | Score | | Set 1 | Set 2 | Set 3 | Set 4 | Set 5 | Total | Report |
|---|---|---|---|---|---|---|---|---|---|---|---|
| 25 Aug | 15:00 | Colombia | 0–3 | Switzerland | 10–25 | 11–25 | 14–25 | | | 35–75 | P2 P3 |

13th-16th place semifinals

| Date | Time | | Score | | Set 1 | Set 2 | Set 3 | Set 4 | Set 5 | Total | Report |
|---|---|---|---|---|---|---|---|---|---|---|---|
| 26 Aug | 15:00 | Latvia | 3–0 | Colombia | 25–22 | 25–22 | 25–15 | | | 75–59 | P2 P3 |

15th place match

| Date | Time | | Score | | Set 1 | Set 2 | Set 3 | Set 4 | Set 5 | Total | Report |
|---|---|---|---|---|---|---|---|---|---|---|---|
| 27 Aug | 13:00 | Mexico | 3–1 | Colombia | 18–25 | 25–11 | 25–23 | 25–16 | | 93–75 | P2 P3 |

== Weightlifting ==
| Athlete | Event | Snatch | | Clean & Jerk | | Total | Rank |
| Athlete | Event | Result | Rank | Result | Rank | Total | Rank |
|---|---|---|---|---|---|---|---|
| Ana Isabel Arce | Women's 48 kg | DSQ | | | | | — |
| Lesman Paredes | Men's 94 kg | DNS | | | | | — |
| Jessica Yulieth Ramirez | Women's 53 kg | 67 | 2 | 86 | 2 | 153 | 12 |
