= Indonesia at the 2017 Summer Universiade =

- World Aquatics code: INA
- National federation: Indonesia University Sports Council
- Website: www.nocindonesia.or.id

in Taipei, Taiwan 19 – 30 July 2017
- Competitors: 52 in 9 sports
- Medals Ranked 60th: Gold 0 Silver 0 Bronze 3 Total 3

Summer Universiade appearances
- 1959; 1961; 1963; 1965; 1967; 1970; 1973; 1975; 1977; 1979; 1981; 1983; 1985; 1987; 1989; 1991; 1993; 1995; 1997; 1999; 2001; 2003; 2005; 2007; 2009; 2011; 2013; 2015; 2017; 2019; 2021; 2025; 2027

Indonesia participated at the 2017 Summer Universiade, in Taipei, Taiwan with 52 competitors in 9 sports.

== Competitors ==
The following table lists Indonesia's delegation per sport and gender.

Sport	Men	Women	Total
Archery	2	4	6
Athletics	2	2	4
Badminton	4	4	8
Fencing	3	0	3
Swimming	5	3	8
Taekwondo	4	0	4
Tennis	2	2	4
Weightlifting	3	6	9
Wushu	3	3	6
Total	28	24	52

== Medallists ==
Medal	Name	Sport	Event
Bronze	Sri Wahyuni Agustiani	Weightlifting	Women's 48 kg
Bronze	Puja Riyaya	Wushu	Men's Sanda - 70 kg
Bronze	Junita Malau	Wushu	Women's Sanda - 52 kg
