= Thailand at the 2017 Summer Universiade =

- IOC code: THA
- NOC: University Sports Board of Thailand
- Website: www.olympicthai.or.th (in Thai and English)

in Taipei, Taiwan 19 – 30 August 2017
- Competitors: 91 in 10 sports
- Flag bearer: Sopita Tanasan
- Medals Ranked 27th: Gold 2 Silver 5 Bronze 6 Total 13

Summer Universiade appearances (overview)
- 1985; 1987; 1989; 1991; 1993; 1995; 1997; 1999; 2001; 2003; 2005; 2007; 2009; 2011; 2013; 2015; 2017; 2019; 2021; 2025; 2027

Thailand participated at the 2017 Summer Universiade, in Taipei, Taiwan.

== Medals by sport ==
Medals by sport
Sport	1st place, gold medalist(s)	2nd place, silver medalist(s)	3rd place, bronze medalist(s)	Total
Tennis	1	2	1	4
Taekwondo	1		1	2
Weightlifting		2	2	4
Badminton		1	2	2
Total	2	5	6	13

== Medalists ==
Medal	Name	Sport	Event	Date
Gold	Panipak Wongpattanakit	Taekwondo	Women's 49 kg	23 August
Gold	Varatchaya Wongteanchai	Tennis	Women's singles	29 August
Silver	Sukanya Srisurat	Weightlifting	Women's 58 kg	21 August
Silver	Chitchanok Pulsabsakul	Weightlifting	Women's +90 kg	25 August
Silver	Varatchaya Wongteanchai; Varunya Wongteanchai	Tennis	Women's doubles	28 August
Silver	Patcharin Cheapchandej; Chompoothip Jundakate; Varatchaya Wongteanchai; Varunya Wongteanchai	Tennis	Women's team	29 August
Silver	Chayanit Chaladchalam; Phataimas Muenwong	Badminton	Women's doubles	29 August
Bronze	Supattra Kaewthong	Weightlifting	Women's 53 kg	21 August
Bronze	Tawin Hanprab	Taekwondo	Men's 58 kg	23 August
Bronze	Sarat Sumpradit	Weightlifting	Men's 94 kg	24 August
Bronze	Nuntakarn Aimsaard; Wannawat Ampunsuwan; Inkarat Apisuk; Chayanit Chaladchalam; Natchpapha Chatupornkarnchana; Sanicha Chumnibannakarn; Tinn Isriyanet; Phataimas Muenwong; Kittisak Namdash; Natcha Saengchote; Pannawit Thongnuam; Parinyawat Thongnuam	Badminton	Mixed team	25 August
Bronze	Patcharin Cheapchandej	Tennis	Women's singles	29 August
Bronze	Pannawit Thongnuam	Badminton	Men's singles	29 August
