= Sri Lanka at the 2017 Summer Universiade =

- IOC code: SRI
- NOC: National Olympic Committee of Sri Lanka
- Website: www.srilankaolympic.org

in Taipei July 19–30
- Competitors: 67 (41 men & 26 women) in 7 sports
- Medals: Gold 0 Silver 0 Bronze 0 Total 0

Summer Universiade appearances
- 1959; 1961; 1963; 1965; 1967; 1970; 1973; 1975; 1977; 1979; 1981; 1983; 1985; 1987; 1989; 1991; 1993; 1995; 1997; 1999; 2001; 2003; 2005; 2007; 2009; 2011; 2013; 2015; 2017; 2019; 2021; 2025; 2027

Sri Lanka participated at the 2017 Summer Universiade which was held in Taipei, Taiwan.

Sri Lanka sent a delegation consisting of 67 competitors for the event competing in 7 different sports.

Sri Lanka didn't win any medal in the multi-sport event.

== Participants ==
Sport	Men	Women	Total
Athletics	14	7	21
Badminton	5	5	10
Table tennis	5	5	10
Swimming	4	4	8
Tennis	4	2	6
Weightlifting	6	0	6
Taekwondo	3	3	6
