= Sweden at the 2017 Summer Universiade =

- IOC code: SWE
- NOC: Swedish Olympic Committee

in Taipei July 19–30
- Competitors: 68 (32 men & 36 women) in 12 sports
- Medals: Gold 0 Silver 1 Bronze 1 Total 2

Summer Universiade appearances
- 1959; 1961; 1963; 1965; 1967; 1970; 1973; 1975; 1977; 1979; 1981; 1983; 1985; 1987; 1989; 1991; 1993; 1995; 1997; 1999; 2001; 2003; 2005; 2007; 2009; 2011; 2013; 2015; 2017; 2019; 2021

Sweden participated at the 2017 Summer Universiade which was held in Taipei, Taiwan.

Sweden sent a delegation consisting of 68 competitors for the event competing in 12 sporting events. Sweden claimed two medals at the multi-sport event.

== Participants ==
Sport	Men	Women	Total
Archery	2	2	4
Athletics	1	1	2
Badminton	2	3	5
Basketball	0	11	11
Diving	0	1	1
Fencing	6	4	10
Gymnastics	0	1	1
Swimming	9	2	11
Table tennis	5	4	9
Taekwondo	3	2	5
Tennis	2	2	4
Weightlifting	2	3	5

== Medallists ==
Medal	Name	Sport	Event
Silver	Skagius Erik	Swimming	men's 50m breaststroke
Bronze	Eriksson Jessica	Swimming	women's 50m breaststroke
