= Jada Hart =

American tennis player (born 1998)

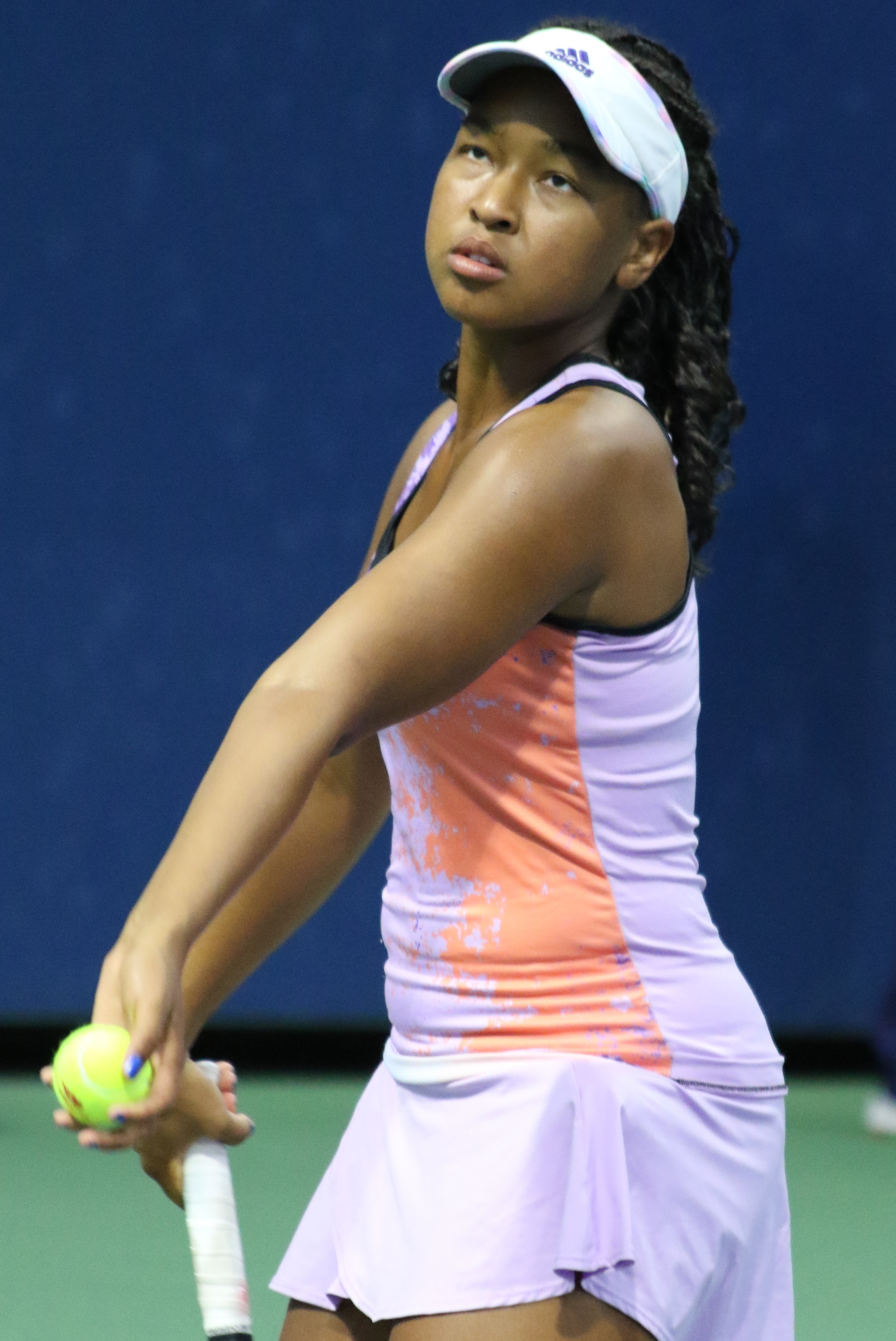
- Hart at the 2016 US Open
- Full name: Jada Myii Hart
- Country (sports): United States
- Born: March 19, 1998 (age 27) Colton, United States
- Plays: Right (two-handed backhand)
- Prize money: $17,637

Singles
- Career record: 14–19
- Career titles: 0
- Highest ranking: No. 851 (September 23, 2019)

Doubles
- Career record: 32–23
- Career titles: 2 ITF
- Highest ranking: No. 296 (July 17, 2023)
- Current ranking: No. 856 (April 15, 2024)

Grand Slam doubles results
- US Open: 1R (2016)
- Last updated on: 16 April 2024.

Jada Myii Hart (born 19 March 1998) is an inactive American tennis player.

Hart graduated from Riverside Virtual School in 2016 and is currently attending UCLA. She is a four-time all-American at UCLA. There have been only eight other Bruins to achieve that prestigious accomplishment. She also went on to achieve her master's degree during her enrollment.

Hart made her Grand Slam main-draw debut at the 2016 US Open in the doubles event, partnering with Ena Shibahara as wildcard entrants, where they lost to seventh seeds Sania Mirza and Barbora Strýcová in the first round. Later in the tournament, Hart and Shibahara won the girls' doubles title.

== Grand Slam doubles performance timeline ==
Key
W	F	SF	QF	#R	RR	Q#	P#	DNQ	A	Z#	PO	G	S	B	NMS	NTI	P	NH

(W) winner; (F) finalist; (SF) semifinalist; (QF) quarterfinalist; (#R) rounds 4, 3, 2, 1; (RR) round-robin stage; (Q#) qualification round; (P#) preliminary round; (DNQ) did not qualify; (A) absent; (Z#) Davis/Fed Cup Zonal Group (with number indication) or (PO) play-off; (G) gold, (S) silver or (B) bronze Olympic/Paralympic medal; (NMS) not a Masters tournament; (NTI) not a Tier I tournament; (P) postponed; (NH) not held; (SR) strike rate (events won / competed); (W–L) win–loss record.
To avoid confusion and double counting, these charts are updated at the conclusion of a tournament or when the player's participation has ended.

Tournament	2016	W–L
Australian Open	A	0–0
French Open	A	0–0
Wimbledon	A	0–0
US Open	1R	0–1
Win–loss	0–1	0–1

== ITF Circuit finals ==
=== Doubles: 4 (2 titles, 2 runner-ups) ===
Legend
$80,000 tournaments
$60,000 tournaments
$25,000 tournaments

Result	W–L	Date	Tournament	Tier	Surface	Partner	Opponents	Score
Loss	0–1	Aug 2019	ITF Fort Worth, United States	25,000	Hard	(United States) Elysia Bolton	(Romania) Gabriela Lee (Chinese Taipei) Hsu Chieh-yu	6–7, 5–7
Loss	0–2	Aug 2022	Lexington Challenger, United States	60,000	Hard	(United States) Dalayna Hewitt	(Indonesia) Aldila Sutjiadi (Ukraine) Kateryna Volodko	5–7, 3–6
Win	1–2	Jan 2023	ITF Orlando Pro, United States	25,000	Hard	(United States) Rasheeda McAdoo	(Japan) Haruna Arakawa (Japan) Natsuho Arakawa	6–3, 6–3
Win	2–2	Feb 2023	ITF Santo Domingo, Dominican Republic	25,000	Hard	(United States) Rasheeda McAdoo	(Netherlands) Arianne Hartono (Netherlands) Eva Vedder	6–3, 6–3

== Junior Grand Slam finals ==
=== Girls' doubles ===
Result	Year	Tournament	Surface	Partner	Opponents	Score
Win	2016	US Open	Hard	(United States) Ena Shibahara	(United States) Kayla Day (United States) Caroline Dolehide	4–6, 6–2, [13–11]
