= Slovakia at the 2017 Summer Universiade =

- IOC code: SVK
- NOC: Slovak Olympic Committee
- Website: www.olympic.sk

in Taipei, Taiwan 19 – 30 July 2017
- Competitors: 50 in 13 sports
- Medals Ranked 50th: Gold 0 Silver 1 Bronze 1 Total 2

Summer Universiade appearances (overview)
- 1993; 1995; 1997; 1999; 2001; 2003; 2005; 2007; 2009; 2011; 2013; 2015; 2017; 2019; 2021

Slovakia participated at the 2017 Summer Universiade, in Taipei, Taiwan.

== Medal summary ==
=== Medal by sports ===
Medals by sport
Sport	1st place, gold medalist(s)	2nd place, silver medalist(s)	3rd place, bronze medalist(s)	Total
Athletics	0	0	1	1
Tennis	0	1	0	1
Total	0	1	1	2
