= Great Britain at the 2017 Summer Universiade =

- IOC code: GBR
- NOC: British Olympic Association
- Website: www.teamgb.com

in Taipei, Taiwan 19 – 30 August 2017
- Competitors: 112 in 12 sports
- Medals Ranked 45th: Gold 0 Silver 3 Bronze 6 Total 9

Summer Universiade appearances
- 1959; 1961; 1963; 1965; 1967; 1970; 1973; 1975; 1977; 1979; 1981; 1983; 1985; 1987; 1989; 1991; 1993; 1995; 1997; 1999; 2001; 2003; 2005; 2007; 2009; 2011; 2013; 2015; 2017; 2019; 2021

Great Britain participated at the 2017 Summer Universiade, in Taipei, Taiwan.

== Medal summary ==
Medal	Name	Sport	Event
Silver	Jonathan Davies	Athletics	Men's 5000 metres
Silver	Jay Lelliott	Swimming	Men's 400 metre freestyle
Silver	Jack Findel-Hawkins; Luke Johnson	Tennis	Men's doubles
Bronze	Jonathan Davies	Athletics	Men's 1500 metres
Bronze	Jessica Judd	Athletics	Women's 5000 metres
Bronze	Joe Litchfield	Swimming	Men's 200 metre individual medley
Bronze	Rachael Kelly	Swimming	Women's 100 metre butterfly
Bronze	Emily Arbuthnott; Olivia Nicholls	Tennis	Women's doubles
Bronze	Mercy Brown	Weightlifting	Women's +90 kg

=== Medal by sports ===
Medals by sport
Sport	1st place, gold medalist(s)	2nd place, silver medalist(s)	3rd place, bronze medalist(s)	Total
Athletics	0	1	2	3
Swimming	0	1	2	3
Tennis	0	1	1	2
Weightlifting	0	0	1	1
Total	0	3	6	9

== Archery ==
Men

Athlete	Event	Ranking round		Round of 128	Round of 64	Round of 32	Round of 16	Quarterfinals	Semifinals	Final / BM	
Athlete	Event	Score	Seed	Opposition Score	Opposition Score	Opposition Score	Opposition Score	Opposition Score	Opposition Score	Opposition Score	Rank
Thomas Howard Hall	Individual recurve	656	16	Bye	Malavasic (SLO); L 2-4	did not advance					
Jack Masefield	Individual recurve	596	65	Bizjak (SLO); L 5-0	did not advance						
Ashe-Wynter Morgan	Individual recurve	631	41	Ecuan (PHI); W 4-0	Álvarez (MEX); L 3-4	did not advance					
Andrew Arledge Brooks	Individual compound	662	44	—	Hidalgo Ibarra (MEX); L 135-139	did not advance					

Women

Athlete	Event	Ranking round		Round of 64	Round of 32	Round of 16	Quarterfinals	Semifinals	Final / BM	
Athlete	Event	Score	Seed	Opposition Score	Opposition Score	Opposition Score	Opposition Score	Opposition Score	Opposition Score	Rank
Rebecca Blewett	Individual compound	658	38	Savenkova (RUS); L 136-141	did not advance					
Hope Greenwood	Individual compound	683	6	Bye	Savenkova (RUS); L 135-138	did not advance				

Teams

Athlete	Event	Ranking round		Round of 16	Quarterfinals	Semifinals	Final / BM	
Athlete	Event	Score	Seed	Opposition Score	Opposition Score	Opposition Score	Opposition Score	Rank
Thomas Howard Hall; Jack Masefield; Ashe-Wynter Morgan	Men's team recurve	1883	11 Q	Mexico (MEX); L 1-5	did not advance			
Andrew Arledge Brooks; Hope Greenwood	Mixed team compound	1345	13 Q	Chinese Taipei (TPE); L 146-150	did not advance			

== Athletics ==
Men's track

Athlete	Event	Heat		Quarterfinal		Semifinal		Final	
Athlete	Event	Result	Rank	Result	Rank	Result	Rank	Result	Rank
Samuel Osewa	100 metres	10.49	13 Q	10.48	12 Q	10.42	10	did not advance	
James Bowness	800 metres	1:50.49	1 Q	1:48.78	8	did not advance			
Jonathan Davies	1500 metres	3:43.95	3 Q	—				3:43.99	3rd place, bronze medalist(s)
Jonathan Davies	5000 metres	14:25.43	4 Q	—				14:02.46	2nd place, silver medalist(s)
Jacob Paul	400 metres hurdles	51.38	20 Q	—		50.37	9	did not advance	
Zak Seddon	3000 metres steeplechase	—						8:39.30	6

Men's field

Athlete	Event	Qualification		Final	
Athlete	Event	Distance	Position	Distance	Position
Daniel Gardiner	Long jump	7.59	14	did not advance	
Allan Smith	High jump	2.15	1 q	2.23	4
Samuel Trigg	Triple jump	15.61	12 q	14.94	12
Charlies Myers	Pole vault	DNS			
Gregory Thompson	Discus throw	57.94	6 q	57.52	8

Women's track

Athlete	Event	Heat		Quarterfinal		Semifinal		Final	
Athlete	Event	Result	Rank	Result	Rank	Result	Rank	Result	Rank
Corinne Humphreys	100 metres	11.46	4 Q	11.52	5 Q	11.71	8 Q	11.49	4
Adelle Tracey	800 metres	2:05.78	10 Q	—		2:03.30	7 Q	2:03.72	5
Melissa Courtney	1500 metres	4:18.68	2 Q	—				4:21.14	5
Jessica Judd	5000 metres	Bye						15:51.19	3rd place, bronze medalist(s)
Louise Small	5000 metres	Bye						15:55.55	4
Jennifer Nesbitt	10,000 metres	Bye						34:01.34	5
Louise Small	10,000 metres	Bye						35:03.93	10
Alicia Barrett	100 metres hurdles	13.75	14 Q	—		13.75	13	did not advance	
Jessica Turner	400 metres hurdles	57.73	3 q	—				57.45	5

Women's field

Athlete	Event	Qualification		Final	
Athlete	Event	Distance	Position	Distance	Position
Amelia Strickler	Shot put	16.38	8 q	17.13	6

== Football ==
=== Women's tournament ===
The women's team participated in Group D and finished in 9th place overall.

Roster

Name	University
Chloe Dixon	University of Barnsley
Ellie Dobson	Northumbria University
Tyler Dodds	Northumbria University
Emily Donovan	University of Bath
Gemma Evans	University of South Wales
Georgia Evans	University of Gloucestershire
Demi-Lee Falconer	University of Stirling
Olivia Fergusson	University of the West of England
Maddie Hill	Northumbria University
Kirsty Howatt	University of Edinburgh
Annabel Johnson	Durham University
Emma Kelly	Northumbria University
Chloe Lloyd	University of South Wales
Rhema Lord-Mears	University of Huddersfield
Katy Morris	University of Stirling
Lucy Quinn	University of Chichester
Chloe Sansom	Buckinghamshire New University
Shannon Sievwright	University of Chichester
Megan Walsh	University of Liverpool
Ellie Wilson	Buckinghamshire New University
