= Kazakhstan at the 2017 Summer Universiade =

- IOC code: KAZ
- NOC: National Olympic Committee of the Republic of Kazakhstan
- Website: http://www.olympic.kz/

in Taipei, Taiwan 19 – 30 August 2017
- Competitors: 122 in 13 sports
- Medals Ranked 21st: Gold 3 Silver 6 Bronze 7 Total 16

Summer Universiade appearances
- 1959; 1961; 1963; 1965; 1967; 1970; 1973; 1975; 1977; 1979; 1981; 1983; 1985; 1987; 1989; 1991; 1993; 1995; 1997; 1999; 2001; 2003; 2005; 2007; 2009; 2011; 2013; 2015; 2017; 2019; 2021; 2025; 2027

Kazakhstan participated at the 2017 Summer Universiade which was held in Taipei, Taiwan.

Kazakhstan sent a delegation consisting of only 122 competitors for the event competing 13 sporting events. Kazakhstan claimed 16 medals at the multi-sport event.

== Medalists ==
Medal	Name	Sport	Event	Date
Gold	Albert Linder	Weightlifting	Men's 69 kg	21 August
Gold	Aidar Kazov	Weightlifting	Men's 77 kg	22 August
Gold	Denis Ulanov	Weightlifting	Men's 85 kg	23 August
Silver	Cansel Deniz	Taekwondo	Women's 73 kg	20 August
Silver	Dmitriy Balandin	Swimming	Men's 200 metre breaststroke	23 August
Silver	Karina Goricheva	Weightlifting	Women's 69 kg	23 August
Silver	Rustem Sybay	Weightlifting	Men's 94 kg	24 August
Silver	Sergey Grigoryev	Athletics	Men's pole vault	27 August
Silver	Ruslan Libirov	Wushu	Men's sanda 70 kg	28 August
Bronze	Arli Chontey	Weightlifting	Men's 56 kg	20 August
Bronze	Rustam Ibrayev	Judo	Men's 60 kg	20 August
Bronze	Galbadrakhyn Otgontsetseg	Judo	Women's 48 kg	20 August
Bronze	Dmitriy Balandin	Swimming	Men's 100 metre breaststroke	21 August
Bronze	Bekadil Shaimerdenov	Judo	Men's 73 kg	22 August
Bronze	Marat Abdikaliyev; Nursultan Mamayev; Sultan Kalibekuly; Smaiyl Duisebay	Taekwondo	Team Kyorugi	26 August
Bronze	Bagdat Kenzhetayev	Wushu	Men's Sanda 80 kg	29 August
