= Hong Kong at the 2017 Summer Universiade =

- IOC code: HKG
- NOC: Sports Federation and Olympic Committee of Hong Kong, China
- Website: www.hkolympic.org

in Taipei, Taiwan 19 – 30 July 2017
- Competitors: 111 in 14 sports
- Flag bearer: Alex Chan Chi-wai (Volleyball)
- Medals Ranked 30th: Gold 2 Silver 0 Bronze 2 Total 4

Summer Universiade appearances
- 1959; 1961; 1963; 1965; 1967; 1970; 1973; 1975; 1977; 1979; 1981; 1983; 1985; 1987; 1989; 1991; 1993; 1995; 1997; 1999; 2001; 2003; 2005; 2007; 2009; 2011; 2013; 2015; 2017; 2019; 2021; 2025; 2027

Hong Kong participated at the 2017 Summer Universiade, in Taipei, Taiwan.

== Medal summary ==
=== Medal by sports ===
Medals by sport
Sport	1st place, gold medalist(s)	2nd place, silver medalist(s)	3rd place, bronze medalist(s)	Total
Swimming	2	0	0	2
Tennis	0	0	1	1
Wushu	0	0	1	1
Total	2	0	2	4

== Medalists ==
=== Official Sports ===
Medal	Athlete(s)	Sport	Event	Date
Gold	Siobhán Haughey	Swimming	Women's 100m Freestyle	22 Aug
Gold	Siobhán Haughey	Swimming	Women's 200m Freestyle	25 Aug
Bronze	Wong Chun-hun, Yeung Pak-long	Tennis	Men's Doubles	28 Aug
Bronze	Mok Uen-ying Juanita	Wushu	Women's Taolu Taijiquan & Taijijian	28 Aug
