= South Korea at the 2017 Summer Universiade =

- IOC code: KOR
- NOC: Korean Sport & Olympic Committee
- Website: www.sports.or.kr/eng/index.do (in English)

in Taipei, Taiwan 19 – 30 July 2017
- Competitors: 318 in 22 sports
- Medals Ranked 2nd: Gold 30 Silver 22 Bronze 30 Total 82

Summer Universiade appearances (overview)
- 1959; 1961; 1963; 1965; 1967; 1970; 1973; 1975; 1977; 1979; 1981; 1983; 1985; 1987; 1989; 1991; 1993; 1995; 1997; 1999; 2001; 2003; 2005; 2007; 2009; 2011; 2013; 2015; 2017; 2019; 2021; 2025; 2027

South Korea participated at the 2017 Summer Universiade, in Taipei, Taiwan.

== Medal summary ==
=== Medal by sports ===
Medals by sport
| Sport | 1st place, gold medalist(s) | 2nd place, silver medalist(s) | 3rd place, bronze medalist(s) | Total |
|---|---|---|---|---|
| Archery | 9 | 0 | 3 | 12 |
| Badminton | 1 | 1 | 0 | 1 |
| Baseball | 0 | 0 | 1 | 1 |
| Billiards | 0 | 1 | 0 | 1 |
| Diving | 1 | 3 | 3 | 7 |
| Fencing | 1 | 1 | 1 | 3 |
| Golf | 0 | 0 | 1 | 1 |
| Gymnastics | 0 | 1 | 0 | 1 |
| Judo | 4 | 5 | 4 | 13 |
| Roller Sports | 4 | 2 | 5 | 11 |
| Swimming | 0 | 0 | 3 | 3 |
| Table tennis | 3 | 1 | 2 | 6 |
| Taekwondo | 6 | 6 | 3 | 15 |
| Tennis | 0 | 1 | 0 | 1 |
| Weightlifting | 0 | 0 | 2 | 2 |
| Wushu | 1 | 1 | 2 | 4 |
| Total | 30 | 22 | 30 | 82 |
