= Badminton at the 2017 Summer Universiade – Women's singles =

Badminton championships

Women's singles at the 2017 Summer Universiade
- Venue: Taipei Gymnasium
- Location: Taipei, Taiwan
- Dates: 27–29 August 2017

Medalists
gold medal	Tai Tzu-ying	Chinese Taipei
silver medal	Lee Jang-mi	South Korea
bronze medal	Chiang Mei-hui	Chinese Taipei
bronze medal	Yang Li Lian	Malaysia

The women's singles Badminton event at the 2017 Summer Universiade was held from August 27 to 29 at the Taipei Gymnasium in Taipei, Taiwan.

== Draw ==
=== Finals ===
Quarterfinals
Tai Tzu-ying (TPE)	21	21
Lianne Tan (BEL)	12	11
Chiang Mei-hui (TPE)	22	21
Kim Joo-eun (KOR)	20	12
Yang Li Lian (MAS)	21	21
Lee Chia-hsin (TPE)	19	15
Yvonne Li (GER)	20	16
Lee Jang-mi (KOR)	22	21

Semifinals
Tai Tzu-ying (TPE)	21	21
Chiang Mei-hui (TPE)	15	13
Yang Li Lian (MAS)	17	15
Lee Jang-mi (KOR)	21	21

Final
Tai Tzu-ying (TPE)	21	21
Lee Jang-mi (KOR)	9	13

=== Top half ===
==== Section 1 ====
Round of 64
AS Paragsingh (SUR)	5	2
A Sugino (JPN)	21	21
E Baldauf (AUT)	10	13
K Xu (USA)	21	21
G Cavalcante (BRA)	21	21
S Yangchen (BHU)	4	4
L Tan (BEL)	21	21
A Giri (NEP)	6	16
LD Magallano (PHI)	10	9
Chung ZYC (HKG)	21	21
N Aimsaard (THA)	21	21
Lee SZ (SGP)	14	13
AN Rathnasiri (SRI)	21	21
S Pakenham (CAN)	15	17

Round of 32
Tai T-y (TPE)	21	21
A Sugino (JPN)	14	13
K Xu (USA)	21	21
G Cavalcante (BRA)	12	13
L Tan (BEL)	21	21
Chung ZYC (HKG)	13	19
N Aimsaard (THA)	21	21
AN Rathnasiri (SRI)	12	12

Round of 16
Tai T-y (TPE)	21	21
K Xu (USA)	5	15
L Tan (BEL)	18	21	21
N Aimsaard (THA)	21	17	12

Quarterfinals
Tai T-y (TPE)	21	21
L Tan (BEL)	12	11

==== Section 2 ====
Round of 64
Chiang M-h (TPE)	21	21
D Estrella (PHI)	5	11
R Mokerjee (IND)	16	14
MI Salsabila (INA)	21	21
J Tam (AUS)	18	14
M Chen (USA)	21	21
Chong FJ (SGP)	21	21
A Nakiyemba (UGA)	8	11
Yap RC (MAS)	21	21
I Aslan (SWE)	14	16
H Piho (EST)	16	10
S Aghaei (IRI)	21	21
Kim J-e (KOR)	21	21
T Wang (CAN)	16	13
E Komendrovskaja (RUS)	21	21
K Stanković (SLO)	14	18

Round of 32
Chiang M-h (TPE)	21	23
MI Salsabila (INA)	11	21
M Chen (USA)	21	21
Chong FJ (SGP)	12	11
Yap RC (MAS)	19	21	21
S Aghaei (IRI)	21	13	10
Kim J-e (KOR)	21	21
E Komendrovskaja (RUS)	19	13

Round of 16
Chiang M-h (TPE)	21	21
M Chen (USA)	12	11
Yap RC (MAS)	11	17
Kim J-e (KOR)	21	21

Quarterfinals
Chiang M-h (TPE)	22	21
Kim J-e (KOR)	20	12

=== Bottom half ===
==== Section 3 ====
Round of 64
Yang LL (MAS)	21	16	21
R Devasthale (IND)	14	21	17
CA Citron (PHI)	16	11
J Vyver (RSA)	21	21
KI Sirimannage (SRI)	21	21
P Eduarda Rodrigues (BRA)	9	15
S Delavarikashani (IRI)	11	12
B Tam (CAN)	21	21
A Xu (USA)	21	21
N Oyinloye (NGR)	7	4
R Wangmo (BHU)	5	8
N Shimoda (JPN)	21	21
M Simić (SRB)	14	17
A Ronzhina (RUS)	21	21
J Stanisz (POL)	6	8
Lee C-h (TPE)	21	21

Round of 32
Yang LL (MAS)	21	21
J Vyver (RSA)	9	7
KI Sirimannage (SRI)	21	16	19
B Tam (CAN)	7	21	21
A Xu (USA)	11	3
N Shimoda (JPN)	21	21
A Ronzhina (RUS)	8	11
Lee C-h (TPE)	21	21

Round of 16
Yang LL (MAS)	21	21
B Tam (CAN)	8	18
N Shimoda (JPN)	11	19
Lee C-h (TPE)	21	21

Quarterfinals
Yang LL (MAS)	21	21
Lee C-h (TPE)	19	15

==== Section 4 ====
Round of 64
VV Bhale (IND)	21	21
A Wallin (SWE)	10	10
Sun AYX (SGP)	12	11
Tang HL (HKG)	21	21
K Lattik (EST)	10	12
N Saengchote (THA)	21	21
B Bangi (UGA)	5	8
Y Li (GER)	21	21
L Cheah (MAS)	21	12	21
TP Hendahewa (SRI)	18	21	12
A Semenova (RUS)	16
T Ho (AUS)	17	Ret
P Kahaka (BOT)	5	5
Y Hoyaux (FRA)	21	21

Round of 32
VV Bhale (IND)	21	21
Tang HL (HKG)	17	15
N Saengchote (THA)	21	14	8
Y Li (GER)	16	21	21
L Cheah (MAS)	21	21
A Semenova (RUS)	19	13
Y Hoyaux (FRA)	10	3
Lee J-m (KOR)	21	21

Round of 16
VV Bhale (IND)	18	23	9
Y Li (GER)	21	21	21
L Cheah (MAS)	18	15
Lee J-m (KOR)	21	21

Quarterfinals
Y Li (GER)	20	16
Lee J-m (KOR)	22	21

Remark : Ret=Retired
