= Badminton at the 2017 Summer Universiade – Men's doubles =

Men's doubles at the 2017 Summer Universiade
- Venue: Taipei Gymnasium
- Location: Taipei, Taiwan
- Dates: 27–29 August 2017
- Competitors: 100 from 30 nations

Medalists
gold medal	Kim Jae-hwan; Seo Seung-jae	South Korea
silver medal	Katsuki Tamate; Kenya Mitsuhashi	Japan
bronze medal	Lee Jhe-huei; Lee Yang	Chinese Taipei
bronze medal	Jagdish Singh; Vincent Cheng Wei Phuah	Malaysia

The men's doubles badminton event at the 2017 Summer Universiade took place from August 27 to 29 at Taipei Gymnasium in Taipei, Taiwan.

== Draw ==
=== Finals ===
Quarterfinals
Lee Jhe-huei (TPE); Lee Yang (TPE)	21	21
Jason Ho-shue (CAN); Jonathan Tsan Lai Bing (CAN)	7	8
Katsuki Tamate (JPN); Kenya Mitsuhashi (JPN)	13	21	21
Choi Hyuk-gyun (KOR); Park Kyung-hoon (KOR)	21	17	19
Jagdish Singh (MAS); Vincent Cheng Wei Phuah (MAS)	21	21
Rodion Alimov (RUS); Pavel Kotsarenko (RUS)	17	16
Kim Jae-hwan (KOR); Seo Seung-jae (KOR)	21	21
Tinn Isriyanet (THA); Kittisak Namdash (THA)	9	18

Semifinals
Lee Jhe-huei (TPE); Lee Yang (TPE)	21	21	18
Katsuki Tamate (JPN); Kenya Mitsuhashi (JPN)	14	23	21
Jagdish Singh (MAS); Vincent Cheng Wei Phuah (MAS)	12	12
Kim Jae-hwan (KOR); Seo Seung-jae (KOR)	21	21

Final
Katsuki Tamate (JPN); Kenya Mitsuhashi (JPN)	12	19
Kim Jae-hwan (KOR); Seo Seung-jae (KOR)	21	21

=== Top half ===
==== Section 1 ====
Round of 32
H Zoober (EST); S Sauk (EST)	13	8
M Gangloff (FRA); L Claerbout (FRA)	21	21
A Kumar (IND); Shubham (IND)	6	6
Jeon H-j (KOR); Woo S-h (KOR)	21	21

Round of 16
Lee J-h (TPE); Lee Y (TPE)	21	21
M Gangloff (FRA); L Claerbout (FRA)	9	10
M S Mohd Ismail (MAS); N M A Ayub (MAS)	21	21
Jeon H-j (KOR); Woo S-h (KOR)	15	18

Round of 8
Lee J-h (TPE); Lee Y (TPE)	25	21
M S Mohd Ismail (MAS); N M A Ayub (MAS)	23	16

==== Section 2 ====
Round of 32
J Pitman (USA); Vinson Chiu (USA)	21	21
R Hasnain (PAK); A Masood (PAK)	11	13
A Selladurai (AUS); E Vuong (AUS)	17	19
L H Dias dos Santos (BRA); A de Souza Vasconcellos (BRA)	21	21

Round of 16
Jason H-s (CAN); J Lai B T (CAN)	21	21
J Pitman (USA); V Chiu (USA)	15	17
Koh J-y (SGP); Lucas Wee Z-x (SGP)	21	20	21
L H Dias dos Santos (BRA); A de Souza Vasconcellos (BRA)	12	22	18

Round of 8
Jason H-s (CAN); J Lai B T (CAN)	21	13	21
Koh J-y (SGP); Lucas Wee Z-x (SGP)	15	21	16

==== Section 3 ====
Round of 32
M Šemrov (SLO); M Bajuk (SLO)	21	21
H Ebayo (UGA); Y Musisi (UGA)	5	13
M Biernacki (POL); P Szydłowski (POL)	21	21
P R Weerasuriya (SRI); S D Galbada Liyanage (SRI)	14	18

Round of 16
I Apisuk (THA); W Ampunsuwan (THA)	21	21
M Šemrov (SLO); M Bajuk (SLO)	19	11
K Tamate (JPN); K Mitsuhashi (JPN)	21	21
M Biernacki (POL); P Szydłowski (POL)	18	14

Round of 8
I Apisuk (THA); W Ampunsuwan (THA)	11	10
K Tamate (JPN); K Mitsuhashi (JPN)	21	21

==== Section 4 ====
Round of 32
R Kargaev (RUS); V Kuznetsov (RUS)	17	17
Chang T-c (HKG); Yeung M-n (HKG)	21	21
William Cheung W-h (USA); Justin Ma (USA)	7	9
Choi H-g (KOR); Park K-h (KOR)	21	21
J Pechera (PHI); J Clartio (PHI)	8	18
D Hess (GER); J Pistorius (GER)	21	21

Round of 16
Hsu J-h (TPE); Wang T-w (TPE)	20	21
Chang T-c (HKG); Yeung M-n (HKG)	22	23
Choi H-g (KOR); Park K-h (KOR)	21	21
D Hess (GER); J Pistorius (GER)	15	18

Round of 8
Chang T-c (HKG); Yeung M-n (HKG)	10	8
Choi H-g (KOR); Park K-h (KOR)	21	21

=== Bottom half ===
==== Section 5 ====
Round of 32
J S Danoa Kuldip Singh (MAS); Vincent C W Phuah (MAS)	21	21
A Nair (RSA); B Von Bodenstein (RSA)	12	10
C Nakaanda (ZAM); M Banda (ZAM)	17	9
A La (USA); Darren Yang C-d (USA)	21	21
P Lundqvist (SWE); S Bergström (SWE)	10	17
R Dhanriano (INA); A Baariq (INA)	21	21

Round of 16
J S Danoa Kuldip Singh (MAS); Vincent C W Phuah (MAS)	21	21
A La (USA); Darren Yang C-d (USA)	9	16
R Dhanriano (INA); A Baariq (INA)	12	21	21
Wang C-l (TPE); Yang P-h (TPE)	21	19	19

Round of 8
J S Danoa Kuldip Singh (MAS); Vincent C W Phuah (MAS)	18	30	21
R Dhanriano (INA); A Baariq (INA)	21	28	12

==== Section 6 ====
Round of 32
T Olekantse (BOT); T Kabomo (BOT)	12	7
T Popov (FRA); T Baures (FRA)	21	21
M Kaart (EST); K Kapp (EST)	9	16
Poon J-r (SGP); S Vighnesh (SGP)	21	21

Round of 16
T Popov (FRA); T Baures (FRA)	21	22
K Jindal (IND); H Makkar (IND)	15	20
Poon J-r (SGP); S Vighnesh (SGP)	13	11
R Alimov (RUS); P Kotsarenko (RUS)	21	21

Round of 8
T Popov (FRA); T Baures (FRA)	21	12
R Alimov (RUS); P Kotsarenko (RUS)	23	21

==== Section 7 ====
Round of 32
M Järveoja (EST); M Laanes (EST)	18	15
G R Garikapati (IND); K Singh (IND)	21	21
B Atilano (POR); R Mendes (POR)	17	21	8
A Parakhodin (RUS); D Riabov (RUS)	21	14	21

Round of 16
G R Garikapati (IND); K Singh (IND)	21	21
N Rai (BHU); D Khando (BHU)	14	5
A Parakhodin (RUS); D Riabov (RUS)	8	8
Kim J-h (KOR); Seo Seung-jae (KOR)	21	21

Round of 8
G R Garikapati (IND); K Singh (IND)	7	10
Kim J-h (KOR); Seo Seung-jae (KOR)	21	21

==== Section 8 ====
Round of 32
F S Díaz (ARG); D Delmastro (ARG)	7	8
S Ozeki (JPN); S Kawabata (JPN)	21	21
R Haramel Jr. (PHI); Joshua Gacis (PHI)	8	7
P Ambegoda (SRI); S C Hapuarachchi (SRI)	21	21

Round of 16
S Ozeki (JPN); S Kawabata (JPN)	21	21
A J Bauer (CAN); T A Lindeman (CAN)	14	13
P Ambegoda (SRI); S C Hapuarachchi (SRI)	7	6
T Isriyanet (THA); K Namdash (THA)	21	21

Round of 8
S Ozeki (JPN); S Kawabata (JPN)	21	16	16
T Isriyanet (THA); K Namdash (THA)	19	21	21
