= Badminton at the 2017 Summer Universiade – Women's doubles =

Women's doubles at the 2017 Summer Universiade
- Venue: Taipei Gymnasium
- Location: Taipei, Taiwan
- Dates: 27–29 August 2017
- Competitors: 84 from 25 nations

Medalists
| gold medal | Hsu Ya-ching; Wu Ti-jung | Chinese Taipei |
| silver medal | Chayanit Chaladchalam; Phataimas Muenwong | Thailand |
| bronze medal | Annie Xu; Kerry Xu | United States |
| bronze medal | Miyuki Kato; Miki Kashihara | Japan |

The women's doubles badminton event at the 2017 Summer Universiade was held from August 27 to 29 at the Taipei Gymnasium in Taipei, Taiwan.

== Draw ==
=== Finals ===
Quarterfinals
Hsu Ya-ching (TPE); Wu Ti-jung (TPE) | 21 | 30
Goh Yea Ching (MAS); Yang Li Lian (MAS) | 10 | 28
Sanicha Chumnibannakarn (THA); Natchpapha Chatupornkarnchana (THA) | 16 | 16
Annie Xu (USA); Kerry Xu (USA) | 21 | 21
Kavidi Sirimannage (SRI); Thilini Hendahewa (SRI) | 15 | 21 | 11
Miyuki Kato (JPN); Miki Kashihara (JPN) | 21 | 16 | 21
Yoon Tae-kyung (KOR); Lee Seung-hui (KOR) | 14 | 13
Chayanit Chaladchalam (THA); Phataimas Muenwong (THA) | 21 | 21

Semifinals
Hsu Ya-ching (TPE); Wu Ti-jung (TPE) | 21 | 21
Annie Xu (USA); Kerry Xu (USA) | 17 | 17
Miyuki Kato (JPN); Miki Kashihara (JPN) | 25 | 17
Chayanit Chaladchalam (THA); Phataimas Muenwong (THA) | 27 | 21

Final
Hsu Ya-ching (TPE); Wu Ti-jung (TPE) | 21 | 22
Chayanit Chaladchalam (THA); Phataimas Muenwong (THA) | 17 | 20

=== Top half ===
==== Section 1 ====
Round of 64
M Chen (USA); M Sporkert (USA) | 14 | 16
E Komendrovskaja (RUS); K Evgenova (RUS) | 21 | 21

Round of 32
Hsu Y-c (TPE); Wu T-j (TPE) | 21 | 21
R Miyaura (JPN); R Katsumata (JPN) | 16 | 17
J van der Vyver (RSA); L A T De Wet (RSA) | 6 | 6
E Komendrovskaja (RUS); K Evgenova (RUS) | 21 | 21

Round of 16
Hsu Y-c (TPE); Wu T-j (TPE) | 21 | 21
E Komendrovskaja (RUS); K Evgenova (RUS) | 11 | 8

==== Section 2 ====
Round of 64
Park M-j (KOR); Ji J-b (KOR) | 21 | 21
R Kapaur Mud. (SRI); O Kuruppu (SRI) | 13 | 12

Round of 32
Goh Y C (MAS); Yang L L (MAS) | 21 | 21
Fiona Seah J F (SGP); Chong F J (SGP) | 13 | 10
K Kanwal (IND); R Mukherjee (IND)
Park M-j (KOR); Ji J-b (KOR) | w/o

Round of 16
Goh Y C (MAS); Yang L L (MAS) | 21 | 15 | 21
Park M-j (KOR); Ji J-b (KOR) | 12 | 21 | 15

w/o: Walkover.

==== Section 3 ====
Round of 64
C Garin (PHI); G E Ochoa (PHI) | 13 | 12
M Witek (POL); K A Marczak (POL) | 21 | 21

Round of 32
M Tong (CAN); J Wu (CAN) | 19 | 22 | 18
S Chumnibannakarn (THA); N Chatupornkarnchana (THA) | 21 | 20 | 21
Lim S X (SGP); Angel Sun Y X (SGP) | 17 | 15
M Witek (POL); K A Marczak (POL) | 21 | 21

Round of 16
S Chumnibannakarn (THA); N Chatupornkarnchana (THA) | 21 | 21
M Witek (POL); K A Marczak (POL) | 18 | 13

==== Section 4 ====
Round of 64
R Wangmo (BHU); S Yangchen (BHU) | 6 | 11
C D Lam (AUS); Sirin Fan J-m (AUS) | 21 | 21
Annie Xu (USA); Kerry Xu (USA) | 21 | 21
A Wallin (SWE); L Eriksson (SWE) | 17 | 15

Round of 32
L Efler (GER); E Janssens (GER) | 21 | 21
C D Lam (AUS); Sirin Fan J-m (AUS) | 12 | 14
A Ronzhina (RUS); A Semenova (RUS) | 14 | 12
Annie Xu (USA); Kerry Xu (USA) | 21 | 21

Round of 16
L Efler (GER); E Janssens (GER) | 13 | 8
Annie Xu (USA); Kerry Xu (USA) | 21 | 21

=== Bottom half ===
==== Section 5 ====
Round of 64
Y Hoyaux (FRA); V Hériau (FRA) | 20 | 21 | 21
S Delavari (IRI); S Aghaei (IRI) | 22 | 14 | 12
A Budiharti (INA); D A Surya (INA) | 21 | 22
R A Devasthale (IND); V V Bhale (IND) | 15 | 20

Round of 32
Y Hoyaux (FRA); V Hériau (FRA) | 9 | 26 | 13
K I Sirimannage (SRI); T P Hendahewa (SRI) | 21 | 24 | 21
A Budiharti (INA); D A Surya (INA) | 19 | 14
Chiang M-h (TPE); Wen H-y (TPE) | 21 | 21

Round of 16
K I Sirimannage (SRI); T P Hendahewa (SRI) | 21 | 18 | 21
Chiang M-h (TPE); Wen H-y (TPE) | 19 | 21 | 14

==== Section 6 ====
Round of 64
Desiree Siow H S (MAS); Lyddia Cheah L Y (MAS) | 21 | 21
H Piho (EST); S-L Moora (EST) | 13 | 11

Round of 32
Desiree Siow H S (MAS); Lyddia Cheah L Y (MAS)
T Ho (AUS); J Tam (AUS) | RET
A-J Beaulieu (CAN); S Pakenham (CAN) | 8 | 12
M Kato (JPN); M Kashihara (JPN) | 21 | 21

Round of 16
Desiree Siow H S (MAS); Lyddia Cheah L Y (MAS) | 12 | 13
M Kato (JPN); M Kashihara (JPN) | 21 | 21

RET: Retired.

==== Section 7 ====
Round of 64
E Bolotova (RUS); A Davletova (RUS) | 19 | 14
Yoon T-k (KOR); Lee S-h (KOR) | 21 | 21

Round of 32
Yoon T-k (KOR); Lee S-h (KOR) | 21 | 21
Kelly Tan J L (SGP); Lee S Z (SGP) | 5 | 7
B S Bangi (UGA); A Nakiyemba (UGA) | 10 | 8
G Cavalcante Pereira (BRA); P D Eduarda Rodrigues (BRA) | 21 | 21

Round of 16
Yoon T-k (KOR); Lee S-h (KOR) | 21 | 21
G Cavalcante Pereira (BRA); P D Eduarda Rodrigues (BRA) | 6 | 12

==== Section 8 ====
Round of 64
D Estrella (PHI); S A Citron (PHI) | 5 | 9
Adrienne Lin C (USA); V Lai C (USA) | 21 | 21

Round of 32
Adrienne Lin C (USA); V Lai C (USA) | 13 | 11
Yuen S Y (HKG); Chung Z Y C (HKG) | 21 | 21
T Wang (CAN); B Tam (CAN) | 16 | 10
C Chaladchalam (THA); P Muenwong (THA) | 21 | 21

Round of 16
Yuen S Y (HKG); Chung Z Y C (HKG) | 20 | 21 | 14
C Chaladchalam (THA); P Muenwong (THA) | 22 | 15 | 21
