= Silicon Valley International =

The Silicon Valley International is an open international badminton open tournament held in California, United States. The event is part of the Badminton World Federation's International Series and part of the Badminton Pan America Circuit.

== Previous winners ==
Year	Men's singles	Women's singles	Men's doubles	Women's doubles	Mixed doubles
2019	(Canada) Xiaodong Sheng	(Japan) Natsuki Nidaira	(South Korea) Jung Tae-in (South Korea) Kim Young-hyuk	(United States) Annie Xu (United States) Kerry Xu	(South Korea) Kim Young-hyuk (South Korea) Park Sang-eun

== Performances by nation ==
Top Nations
Pos	Nation	MS	WS	MD	WD	XD	Total
1	South Korea	0	0	1	0	1	2
2	Canada	1	0	0	0	0	1
2	Japan	0	1	0	0	0	1
2	United States	0	0	0	1	0	1
Total		1	1	1	1	1	5
