= Bhutan at the 2017 Summer Universiade =

- IOC code: BHU
- NOC: Bhutan Olympic Committee

in Taipei, Taiwan 19 – 30 August 2017
- Competitors: 7 in 2 sports
- Medals: Gold 0 Silver 0 Bronze 0 Total 0

Summer Universiade appearances
- 1959; 1961; 1963; 1965; 1967; 1970; 1973; 1975; 1977; 1979; 1981; 1983; 1985; 1987; 1989; 1991; 1993; 1995; 1997; 1999; 2001; 2003; 2005; 2007; 2009; 2011; 2013; 2015; 2017; 2019; 2021; 2025; 2027

Bhutan participated at the 2017 Summer Universiade in Taipei, Taiwan with 7 competitors in 2 sports.

== Competitors ==
The following table lists Bhutan's delegation per sport and gender.

Sport	Men	Women	Total
Badminton	2	2	4
Table tennis	2	1	3
Total	4	3	7

== Badminton ==
=== Men ===
Athlete	Event	Round of 64	Round of 32	Round of 16	Quarterfinal	Semifinal	Final / BM	
Athlete	Event	Opposition Score	Opposition Score	Opposition Score	Opposition Score	Opposition Score	Opposition Score	Rank
Dorji Khando	Singles	Daniel Fwu Haur Fan (AUS); L 0-2	Did not advance					39
Nihal Rai	Singles	Woo Seung-hun (KOR); L 0-2	Did not advance					55
Rai/Khando	Doubles	Garikapati/Singh (IND); L 0-2	Did not advance					29

=== Women ===
Athlete	Event	Round of 64	Round of 32	Round of 16	Quarterfinal	Semifinal	Final / BM	
Athlete	Event	Opposition Score	Opposition Score	Opposition Score	Opposition Score	Opposition Score	Opposition Score	Rank
Sonam Yangchen	Singles	Gabriele Cavalcante Pereira (BRA); L 0-2	Did not advance					35
Rinzin Wangmo	Singles	Natsumi Shimoda (JPN); L 0-2	Did not advance					53
Wangmo/Yangchen	Doubles	Lam/Fan (AUS); L 0-2	Did not advance					36

=== Mixed ===
Athlete	Event	Group stage			17th - 23rd place	17th - 20th place	17th place	
Athlete	Event	Opposition Score	Opposition Score	Rank	Opposition Score	Opposition Score	Opposition Score	Rank
Khando; Rai; Wangmo; Yangchen	Team	Japan (JPN); L 0–5	Poland (POL); L 0–5	3	Uganda (UGA); L W/O	Did not advance		35

== Table tennis ==
=== Men ===
Athlete	Event	Group stage			Elimination	Quarterfinal	Semifinal	Final / BM	
Athlete	Event	Opposition Score	Opposition Score	Rank	Opposition Score	Opposition Score	Opposition Score	Opposition Score	Rank
Karma Tashi	Singles	Lars Frederik Banning (NED); L 0-3	Jake Ian Duffy (AUS); L 0-3	3	Did not advance				65
Pema Dendup	Singles	A. K. Don Mewa Abeywickrama (SRI); L 0-3	Reed Daniel James (GBR); L 0-3	3	Did not advance				65
Dendup/Tashi	Doubles	—N/a			Bayarsaikhan/Tumurbaatar (MGL); L 0-3	Did not advance			33

=== Women ===
Athlete	Event	Group stage			Elimination	Quarterfinal	Semifinal	Final / BM	
Athlete	Event	Opposition Score	Opposition Score	Rank	Opposition Score	Opposition Score	Opposition Score	Opposition Score	Rank
Sangay Chezom	Singles	Bolor Ganzorig (MGL); L 0-3	Valeriia Shcherbatykh (MGL); L 0-3	3	Did not advance				65
