= Kerry Xu =

American badminton player

Kerry Xu 許怡霏
Personal information
- Born: October 22, 1999 (age 27) San Jose, California, U.S.
- Height: 5 ft 6 in (168 cm)

Sport
- Country: United States
- Sport: Badminton

Women's doubles
- Highest ranking: 27 (with Annie Xu) (August 13, 2024)
- Current ranking: 27 (with Annie Xu) (September 3, 2024)
- BWF profile
Medal record
Women's badminton
Representing the United States
Pan American Games
Silver medal – second place	2023 Santiago	Women's doubles
Pan Am Championships
Silver medal – second place	2024 Guatemala City	Women's doubles
Bronze medal – third place	2023 Kingston	Women's doubles
Pan Am Mixed Team Championships
Silver medal – second place	2023 Guadalajara	Mixed team
Bronze medal – third place	2017 Santo Domingo	Mixed team
Pan Am Female Badminton Cup
Gold medal – first place	2016 Guadalajara	Women's team
Silver medal – second place	2024 São Paulo	Women's team
Summer Universiade
Bronze medal – third place	2017 Taipei	Women's doubles
Pan Am Junior Championships
Gold medal – first place	2014 Guatemala City	Girls' doubles
Gold medal – first place	2014 Guatemala City	Mixed team
Gold medal – first place	2015 Tijuana	Girls' doubles
Gold medal – first place	2015 Tijuana	Mixed team
Bronze medal – third place	2014 Guatemala City	Girls' singles
Bronze medal – third place	2014 Guatemala City	Mixed doubles

Kerry Xu (born October 22, 1999) is an American badminton player who competes in international elite events. She is a double Pan Am Junior champion; Pan American Games silver medalist; and also Summer Universiade and Pan Am Championships bronze medalists alongside her identical twin sister Annie Xu.

== Achievements ==
=== Pan American Games ===
Women's doubles
Year	Venue	Partner	Opponent	Score	Result
2023	Olympic Training Center; Santiago, Chile	(United States) Annie Xu	(Canada) Catherine Choi (Canada) Josephine Wu	18–21, 21–10, 17–21	Silver

=== Pan Am Championships ===
Women's doubles
Year	Venue	Partner	Opponent	Score	Result
2023	G.C. Foster College of Physical Education and Sport; Kingston, Jamaica	(United States) Annie Xu	(Canada) Catherine Choi (Canada) Josephine Wu	19–21, 8–21	Bronze
2024	Teodoro Palacios Flores Gymnasium; Guatemala City, Guatemala	(United States) Annie Xu	(United States) Francesca Corbett (United States) Allison Lee	14–21, 15–21	Silver

=== Summer Universiade ===
Women's doubles
Year	Venue	Partner	Opponent	Score	Result
2017	Taipei Gymnasium; Taipei, Taiwan	(United States) Annie Xu	(Chinese Taipei) Hsu Ya-ching (Chinese Taipei) Wu Ti-jung	17–21, 17–21	Bronze

=== Pan Am Junior Championships ===
Girls' doubles
Year	Venue	Partner	Opponent	Score	Result
2014	Gimnasio Teodoro Palacios Flores; Guatemala City, Guatemala	(United States) Annie Xu	(United States) Victoria Chen (United States) Crystal Pan	22–20, 21–14	Gold
2015	Centro de Alto Rendimiento; Tijuana, Mexico	(United States) Annie Xu	(United States) Joanna Liu (United States) Crystal Pan	21–12, 21–17	Gold

=== BWF International (4 titles, 5 runners-up) ===
Women's doubles
Year	Tournament	Partner	Opponent	Score	Result
2017	Yonex / K&D Graphics International	(United States) Annie Xu	(Peru) Daniela Macías (Peru) Dánica Nishimura	21–11, 21–12	(gold) Winner
2018	Yonex / K&D Graphics International	(United States) Annie Xu	(Japan) Akane Araki (Japan) Riko Imai	15–21, 19–21	(silver) Runner-up
2019	Silicon Valley International	(United States) Annie Xu	(United States) Breanna Chi (United States) Jennie Gai	21–14, 21–11	(gold) Winner
2022	Peru Challenge	(United States) Annie Xu	(United States) Paula Lynn Cao Hok (United States) Lauren Lam	19–21, 18–21	(silver) Runner-up
2022	El Salvador International	(United States) Annie Xu	(United States) Paula Lynn Cao Hok (United States) Lauren Lam	18–21, 17–21	(silver) Runner-up
2022	Canadian International	(United States) Annie Xu	(Spain) Clara Azurmendi (Spain) Beatriz Corrales	15–21, 21–15, 21–14	(gold) Winner
2023	Guatemala International	(United States) Annie Xu	(Canada) Catherine Choi (Canada) Josephine Wu	18–21, 18–21	(silver) Runner-up
2023	Peru Challenge	(United States) Annie Xu	(Brazil) Jaqueline Lima (Brazil) Sâmia Lima	21–11, 21–10	(gold) Winner
2023	El Salvador International	(United States) Annie Xu	(United States) Francesca Corbett (United States) Allison Lee	18–21, 11–21	(silver) Runner-up

BWF International Challenge tournament
BWF International Series tournament
BWF Future Series tournament
