= Botswana at the 2017 Summer Universiade =

- IOC code: BOT
- NOC: Botswana National Olympic Committee
- Website: www.botswananoc.org (in English)

in Taipei, Taiwan 19 – 30 August 2017
- Competitors: 20 in 4 sports
- Medals: Gold 0 Silver 0 Bronze 0 Total 0

Summer Universiade appearances
- 1959; 1961; 1963; 1965; 1967; 1970; 1973; 1975; 1977; 1979; 1981; 1983; 1985; 1987; 1989; 1991; 1993; 1995; 1997; 1999; 2001; 2003; 2005; 2007; 2009; 2011; 2013; 2015; 2017; 2019; 2021

Botswana participated at the 2017 Summer Universiade, in Taipei, Taiwan with 20 competitors in 4 sports.

== Competitors ==
The following table lists Botswana's delegation per sport and gender.

Sport	Men	Women	Total
Athletics	4	4	8
Badminton	2	2	4
Table Tennis	2	2	4
Tennis	2	2	4
Total	10	10	20

== Athletics ==
=== Men ===
==== Track Events ====
Athlete	Event	Round 1		Round 2		Semifinal		Final	
Athlete	Event	Result	Rank	Result	Rank	Result	Rank	Result	Rank
Cliffton Kagisa Meshack	400m	48.03	4	Did Not Advance					
Samuel Treasure Mosabata	200m	22.78	6	Did Not Advance					
Ditiro Kago Sebele	100m	10.74	5	Did Not Advance					
Ditiro Kago Sebele	200m	DNF	—	Did Not Advance					
Reveilwe Savior Thwanyane	100m	10.92	5	Did Not Advance					
Meshack; Mosabata; Sebele; Thwanyane	4 × 100 m Relay	DNS	—	Did Not Advance					

=== Women ===
==== Track Events ====
Athlete	Event	Round 1		Round 2		Semifinal		Final	
Athlete	Event	Result	Rank	Result	Rank	Result	Rank	Result	Rank
Ontiretse Molapisi	100m	12.56	6	Did Not Advance					
Ontiretse Molapisi	200m	25.50	6	Did Not Advance					
Amantle Hazel Monwa	400m	1:02.05	7	Did Not Advance					
Tsaone Bakani Sebele	100m	11.90	2Q	11.90	4	Did Not Advance			
Tsaone Bakani Sebele	200m	DNF	—	Did Not Advance					
Chilume; Molapisi; Monwa; Sebele	4 × 100 m	48.80	6	Did Not Advance					

==== Field Events ====
Athlete	Event	Qualification		Final	
Athlete	Event	Distance	Position	Distance	Position
Titose Chilume	Long Jump	5.59	9	Did Not Advance	
Titose Chilume	Triple Jump	12.58	7	Did Not Advance	

== Badminton ==
=== Singles and Doubles ===
Athlete	Event	Round of 128	Round of 64	Round of 32	Round of 16	Quarterfinal	Semifinal	Final / BM	
Athlete	Event	Opposition Score	Opposition Score	Opposition Score	Opposition Score	Opposition Score	Opposition Score	Opposition Score	Rank
Tefo Kabomo	Men's Singles	Bye	Jey-Ren Poon (SGP); L 0-2	Did Not Advance					46
Tumisang Katleg Olekantse	Men's Singles	Bye	Andrei Parakhodin (RUS); L 1-2	Did Not Advance					61
Kabomo/Olekantse	Men's Doubles	Bye	Popov/Baures (FRA); L 0-2	Did Not Advance					45
Bonolo Amos	Women's Singles	Bye	DNS	Did Not Advance					—
Penouua Kahaka	Women's Singles	Bye	Yaëlle Hoyaux (FRA); L 0-2	Did Not Advance					62
Amos/Kahaka	Women's Doubles	Bye	DNS	Did Not Advance					—

=== Team ===
Athlete	Event	Group stage			Ranking matches			
Athlete	Event	Opposition Score	Opposition Score	Rank	Opposition Score	Opposition Score	Opposition Score	Rank
Amos; Kabomo; Kahaka; Olekantse	Team	Russia (RUS); L 0–5	United States (USA); L 0–5	3	did not advance			—

== Table Tennis ==
Athlete	Event	Group Stage			Round of 128	Round of 64	Round of 32	Round of 16	Quarterfinals	Semifinals	Final / BM	
Athlete	Event	Opposition Result	Opposition Result	Opposition Result	Opposition Result	Opposition Result	Opposition Result	Opposition Result	Opposition Result	Opposition Result	Opposition Result	Rank
Boago Kabo Malobela	Men's Singles	Klement Chun-Mi Yeung (CAN); L 0-3	Barsbold Tumurbaatar (MGL); L 0-3	—		Did Not Advance						65
Bakang Kevin Maloka	Men's Singles	John Vincent Cabaluna (PHI); L 1-3	Elie Joe Abdel Nour (LBN); L 0-3	—		Did Not Advance						65
Malobela/Maloka	Men's Doubles	—				Fernandez/Roman (CHI); L 0-3	Did Not Advance					33
Refilwe Matlou	Women's Singles	Otgonjargal Enkhbat (MGL); L 0-3	Maria Eleni Tsaptsinos (GBR); L 0-3	—		Did Not Advance						65
Olorato Ramagapu	Women's Singles	Vineta Belanovica (LAT); W 3-0	Laura Gasnier (FRA); L 0-3	—		Did Not Advance						65
Matlou/Ramagapu	Women's Doubles	—				Gonapinuwala Vithanage/ Warusawithana (SRI); L 0-3	Did Not Advance					33
Malobela/Ramagapu	Mixed Doubles	—			Maslovs/Majorova (LAT); L 0-3	Did Not Advance						65
Maloka/Matlou	Mixed Doubles	—				Yokota/Nakashimi (BRA); L 0-3	Did Not Advance					33

== Tennis ==
Athlete	Event	Round 1	Round 2	Round 3	Round 4	Quarterfinals	Semifinals	Final / BM	
Athlete	Event	Opposition Score	Opposition Score	Opposition Score	Opposition Score	Opposition Score	Opposition Score	Opposition Score	Rank
Aobakwe Phenyo Lekang	Men's Singles	Bye	Martin Redlicki (USA); L 0-2	Did Not Advance					
Lekang/Tidimane	Men's Doubles	Koncz/Madarasz (HUN); L W/O	Did Not Advance						
Nthabiseng Mogopodi	Women's Singles	Bye	Madhushani Rajendra (SRI); W 2-0	Wongteanchai (THA); L 0-2	Did Not Advance				
Mogopodi/Ruele	Women's Doubles	Chong/Ip (HKG); L W/O	Did Not Advance						
Lekang/Mogopodi	Mixed Doubles	Bye	Hayashi/Uesugi (JPN); L 0-2	Did Not Advance					
