= Australia at the 2017 Summer Universiade =

- IOC code: AUS
- NOC: Australian Olympic Committee
- Website: corporate.olympics.com.au (in English)

in Taipei, Taiwan 19 – 30 August 2017
- Competitors: 185 in 16 sports
- Medals Ranked 17th: Gold 4 Silver 3 Bronze 2 Total 9

Summer Universiade appearances (overview)
- 1967; 1970; 1973; 1975; 1977; 1979; 1981; 1983; 1985; 1987; 1989; 1991; 1993; 1995; 1997; 1999; 2001; 2003; 2005; 2007; 2009; 2011; 2013; 2015; 2017; 2019; 2021; 2025; 2027

Australia participated at the 2017 Summer Universiade, in Taipei, Taiwan with 185 competitors in 16 sports.

== Competitors ==
The following table lists Australia's delegation per sport and gender.

| Sport | Men | Women | Total |
|---|---|---|---|
| Athletics | 23 | 22 | 45 |
| Badminton | 3 | 4 | 7 |
| Basketball | 11 | 12 | 23 |
| Diving | 1 | 4 | 5 |
| Fencing | 2 | 4 | 6 |
| Gymnastics | 5 | 2 | 7 |
| Judo | 1 | 3 | 4 |
| Swimming | 8 | 10 | 18 |
| Table tennis | 4 | 3 | 7 |
| Taekwondo | 8 | 5 | 13 |
| Tennis | 1 | 2 | 3 |
| Volleyball | 12 | 0 | 12 |
| Water polo | 13 | 13 | 26 |
| Weightlifting | 4 | 1 | 5 |
| Wushu | 1 | 3 | 4 |
| Total | 97 | 88 | 185 |

== Medal summary ==
Medals by sport
| Sport | 1st place, gold medalist(s) | 2nd place, silver medalist(s) | 3rd place, bronze medalist(s) | Total |
|---|---|---|---|---|
| Athletics | 1 | 1 | 1 | 3 |
| Basketball | 1 | 0 | 0 | 1 |
| Diving | 0 | 1 | 0 | 1 |
| Swimming | 2 | 1 | 0 | 3 |
| Taekwondo | 0 | 0 | 1 | 1 |
| Total | 4 | 3 | 2 | 9 |

== Athletics ==
=== Men ===
==== Track Events ====
| Athlete | Event | Round 1 | | Round 2 | | Semifinal | | Final | |
| Athlete | Event | Result | Rank | Result | Rank | Result | Rank | Result | Rank |
|---|---|---|---|---|---|---|---|---|---|
| Rohan Jackson Browning | 100m | 10.60 | 5 | Did Not Advance | | | | | |
| Jin Su Jung | 100m | 10.67 | 4 | Did Not Advance | | | | | |
| Stephen Joseph Knuckey | 800m | 1:52.47 | 2Q | —N/a | | 1:48.39 | 3q | 1:47.90 | 6 |
| Isaac Arthur Hockey | 1500m | 31:14.22 | 3Q | —N/a | | | | 31:14.22 | 6 |
| Adam James Pyke | 1500m | 31:52.77 | 8 | —N/a | | | | Did Not Advance | |
| Bryce William Anderson | 10000m | —N/a | | | | | | 31:14.22 | 12 |
| Riley Samuel Cocks | 10000m | —N/a | | | | | | 30:47.00 | 8 |
| Nicholas Alexander Hough | 110m Hurdles | 13.93 | 3Q | —N/a | | 13.70 | 4q | 13.73 | 6 |
| Nicholas Mance Bate; Rohan Jackson Browning; Taylor Burns; Simon James Greig; Nicholas Alexander Hough; Jin Su Jung | 4 x 100m Relay | 40.33 | 2 | —N/a | | | | Did Not Advance | |
| Taylor Burns; Daniel Thomas P Mowen; Tristan Marc Robinson; Harrison John Roubin | 4 x 400m Relay | 3:09.66 | 3q | —N/a | | | | 3:09.21 | 4 |
| Dylan Alexander Evans | Half Marathon | —N/a | | | | | | 1:11:16 | 17 |

==== Field Events ====
| Athlete | Event | Qualification | | Final | |
| Athlete | Event | Distance | Position | Distance | Position |
|---|---|---|---|---|---|
| Liam Wallace Adcock | Long Jump | 7.45 | 11 | Did Not Advance | |
| Christopher Pet Mitrevski | Long Jump | 7.78 | 2q | 7.66 | 4 |
| Angus Leckie Ro Armstrong | Pole Vault | 5.30 | 2Q | 5.30 | 5 |
| Stephen Michael Clough | Pole Vault | 4.90 | 9 | Did Not Advance | |
| Joseph Heath Aa Baldwin | High Jump | 2.10 | 7 | Did Not Advance | |
| Liam James O'Brien | Javelin | 74.14 | 6q | 69.80 | 11 |
| William David B White | Javelin | 74.16 | 5q | 77.74 | 7 |

==== Combined Events ====
Decathlon

| Athlete | Event | 100 m | LJ | SP | HJ | 400 m | 110H | DT | PV | JT | 1500 m | Final | Rank |
|---|---|---|---|---|---|---|---|---|---|---|---|---|---|
| Kyle Stuart Cranston | Result | 11.13 | 7.04 | 13.76 | 1.98 | 48.99 | 15.11 | 41.53 | 4.60 | 56.30 | 4:42.08 | 7687 | 1st place, gold medalist(s) |
| Kyle Stuart Cranston | Points | 832 | 823 | 714 | 785 | 862 | 836 | 696 | 790 | 682 | 667 | 7687 | 1st place, gold medalist(s) |

=== Women ===
==== Track Events ====
| Athlete | Event | Round 1 | | Round 2 | | Semifinal | | Final | |
| Athlete | Event | Result | Rank | Result | Rank | Result | Rank | Result | Rank |
|---|---|---|---|---|---|---|---|---|---|
| Georgia Helen Griffith | 800m | 2:04.17 | 3Q | —N/a | | 2:03.17 | 2Q | 2:03.52 | 4 |
| Isobel Mary Batt-Doyle | 10000m | —N/a | | | | | | 34:32.13 | 7 |
| Elizabeth Anne Clay | 100m Hurdles | 14.92 | 6 | —N/a | | Did Not Advance | | | |
| Michelle Amy Jenneke | 100m Hurdles | 13.44 | 1Q | —N/a | | 13.55 | 2Q | 14.82 | 8 |
| Paige Elizabeth Campbell | 3000m Steeplechase | —N/a | | | | | | 10:00.15 | 4 |
| Stella Louise Radford | 3000m Steeplechase | —N/a | | | | | | 10:36.36 | 13 |
| Jessica Ashleig Pickles | 20 km Walk | —N/a | | | | | | DSQ | N/A |
| Jasmine Cherayn Everett; Elizabeth Megan Hedding; Gabriella Julie O'Grady; Larissa Pasternatsky | 4 x 100m Relay | 45.47 | 2Q | —N/a | | | | 45.15 | 5 |
| Alexandra Joy Bartholomew; Alicia Jane Keir; Gabriella Julie O'Grady; Larissa Pasternatsky; Jessie Catherin Stafford; Lora Marian Storey | 4 x 400m Relay | 3:39.67 | 4q | —N/a | | | | 3:41.08 | 5 |

==== Field Events ====
| Athlete | Event | Qualification | | Final | |
| Athlete | Event | Distance | Position | Distance | Position |
|---|---|---|---|---|---|
| Kathryn Nicole Brooks | Javelin | 52.65 | 8 | Did Not Advance | |
| Mackenzie Patri Little | Javelin | 52.09 | 8 | Did Not Advance | |
| Taryn Linley Gollshewsky | Discus | 56.39 | 2Q | 58.11 | 3rd place, bronze medalist(s) |
| Hannah Catherin Joye | High Jump | 1.75 | 3q | 1.84 | 9 |
| Nicola Lauren McDermott | High Jump | 1.75 | =1q | 1.88 | 7 |
| Lara Louise Nielsen | Hammer | 60.42 | 7Q | 65.47 | 6 |

==== Combined Events ====
Heptathlon

| Athlete | Event | 100H | HJ | SP | 200 m | LJ | JT | 800 m | Final | Rank |
|---|---|---|---|---|---|---|---|---|---|---|
| Alysha Jane Burnett | Result | 14.60 | 1.86 | 12.46 | 25.92 | 6.09 | 46.26 | 2:27.45 | 5835 | 2nd place, silver medalist(s) |
| Alysha Jane Burnett | Points | 895 | 1054 | 692 | 804 | 877 | 788 | 725 | 5835 | 2nd place, silver medalist(s) |

== Badminton ==
| Athlete | Event | Round of 128 | Round of 64 | Round of 32 | Round of 16 | Quarterfinal | Semifinal | Final / BM | |
| Athlete | Event | Opposition Score | Opposition Score | Opposition Score | Opposition Score | Opposition Score | Opposition Score | Opposition Score | Rank |
|---|---|---|---|---|---|---|---|---|---|
| Daniel Fwu Haur Fan | Men's Singles | Bye | Dorji Khando (BHU); W 2-0 | Dylan Dianto Darmohoetomo (SUR); W 2-0 | Lucas Florent Claerbout (SUR); L 0-2 | Did Not Advance | | | 10 |
| Athithan Selladurai | Men's Singles | Bye | Ilija Pavlovic (SRB); L 1-2 | Did Not Advance | | | | | 63 |
| Athithan Selladurai; Eric Vuong | Men's Doubles | —N/a | Dias De Santos Jr./ De Souza Vasconcel (BRA); L 0-2 | Did Not Advance | | | | | 36 |
| Tiffany Celine Ho | Women's Singles | —N/a | Anastasiia Semenova (RUS); L RET-2 | Did Not Advance | | | | | 61 |
| Jennifer Hoi-Kw Tam | Women's Singles | —N/a | Maya Chen (USA); L 0-2 | Did Not Advance | | | | | 42 |
| Claudia Denise Lam; Sirina Jing-Man Fan | Women's Doubles | —N/a | Wangmo/ Yangchen (BHU); W 2-0 | Efler/ Janssens (GER); L 0-2 | Did Not Advance | | | | 23 |
| Tiffany Celine Ho; Jennifer Hoi-Kw Tam | Women's Doubles | —N/a | Siow/ Cheah (USA); L RET-2 | Did Not Advance | | | | | 27 |
| Daniel Fwu Haur Fan; Sirina Jing-Man Fan | Mixed Doubles | —N/a | Semrov/ Bajuk (SLO); L 1-2 | Did Not Advance | | | | | 49 |
| Eric Vuong; Claudia Denise Lam | Mixed Doubles | —N/a | Koh/ Tan (SGP); W 2-1 | Haramel/ Garin (PHI); W 2-1 | Pistorius/ Efler (GER); L 0-2 | Did Not Advance | | | 10 |

== Basketball ==
=== Men's tournament ===
Roster

Australia men's national basketball team – 2017 Summer Universiade roster
Players
Coaches

| Pos. | No. | Name | Age – Date of birth | Height | Club | Ctr. |
|---|---|---|---|---|---|---|
| | 5 | Dejan Vasiljevic | 20 – April 26, 1997 | 1.90 m (6 ft 3 in) | University of Miami | (United States) |
| | 6 | Matt Kenyon | 19 – February 8, 1998 | 1.95 m (6 ft 5 in) | University of Southern Queensland | (Australia) |
| | 7 | Jack McVeigh | 21 – June 27, 1996 | 2.03 m (6 ft 8 in) | University of Nebraska–Lincoln | (United States) |
| | 8 | Craig Moller | 22 – August 22, 1994 | 2.06 m (6 ft 9 in) | Deakin University | (Australia) |
| | 9 | Xavier Cooks | 22 – August 19, 1995 | 2.03 m (6 ft 8 in) | Winthrop University | (United States) |
| | 10 | Kyle Adnam | 23 – November 18, 1993 | 2.03 m (6 ft 8 in) | Deakin University | (Australia) |
| | 11 | Rhys Vague | 21 – January 17, 1996 | 2.04 m (6 ft 8 in) | Edith Cowan University | (Australia) |
| | 12 | Emmett Naar | 23 – July 3, 1994 | 1.85 m (6 ft 1 in) | Saint Mary's College of California | (United States) |
| | 13 | Tanner Krebs | 21 – January 4, 1996 | 1.96 m (6 ft 5 in) | Saint Mary's College of California | (United States) |
| | 14 | Tyrell Harrison | 18 – July 6, 1999 | 2.14 m (7 ft 0 in) | University of Southern Queensland | (Australia) |
| | 15 | Gorjok Gak | 20 – November 9, 1996 | 2.11 m (6 ft 11 in) | Florida State University | (United States) |

Head coach

- (Australia) Mark Radford

Assistant coach(es)

- (Australia) Jamie O'Loughlin
- (Australia) Mike Kelly

Legend

- Club – describes university team
  with at time of tournament
- Age – describes age
  on 19 August 2017

Preliminary Round

| Qualified for the Final eight |
| Qualified for the 9th-16th place classification playoffs |
| Qualified for the 17th-24th Classification playoffs |

| Team | Pld | W | L | PF | PA | PD | Pts |
|---|---|---|---|---|---|---|---|
| Lithuania | 5 | 4 | 1 | 471 | 331 | +140 | 9 |
| Israel | 5 | 4 | 1 | 464 | 358 | +106 | 9 |
| Ukraine | 5 | 4 | 1 | 412 | 364 | +48 | 9 |
| Australia | 5 | 3 | 2 | 408 | 380 | +28 | 8 |
| Russia | 5 | 1 | 4 | 383 | 432 | −49 | 6 |
| Mozambique | 5 | 0 | 5 | 236 | 509 | −273 | 5 |

20 August 2017
12:30 (UTC+8)

Report

| Australia | 76–80 | Ukraine |
Scoring by quarter: 18–18, 15–20, 21–18, 22–24

Taipei Arena
Referees: G.A. Todey (USA), F.V. Barrera (CHI), S. Arisawa (JAP)

21 August 2017
15:00 (UTC+8)

Report

| Lithuania | 82–84 | Australia |
Scoring by quarter: 22–23, 15–21, 19–28, 26–12

Taipei Arena
Referees: L.D. Zalazar (ARG), S. Emlek (TUR), P. Hrusa (CZE)

23 August 2017
15:00 (UTC+8)

Report

| Australia | 72–89 | Israel |
Scoring by quarter: 21–25, 14–20, 25–21, 12–23

University of Taipei (Tianmu) Gymnasium
Referees: O. Lucis (LAT), K.Simonov (GER), T. Suslov (EST)

24 August 2017
12:30 (UTC+8)

Report

| Russia | 71–89 | Australia |
Scoring by quarter: 19–25, 17–31, 12–14, 23–19

Taipei Arena
Referees: L.D. Zalazar (ARG), M. Proc (POL), R. Eriksson (SWE)

25 August 2017
10:00 (UTC+8)

Report

| Mozambique | 58–87 | Australia |
Scoring by quarter: 10–18, 14–19, 16–29, 18–21

Taipei Arena
Referees: O. Lucis (LAT), G.A. Todey (USA), G. Kapitany (HUN)

9th-16th Place Quarterfinal

27 August 2017
15:00 (UTC+8)

Report

| Estonia | 83–105 | Australia |
Scoring by quarter: 19–24, 12–24, 28–27, 24–30

University of Taipei (Tianmu) Gymnasium
Referees: G. Vikauskas (LTU), F.V. Barrera (CHI), J. Horiuchi (JAP)

9th-12th Place Semifinal

28 August 2017
20:00 (UTC+8)

Report

| Mexico | 71–93 | Australia |
Scoring by quarter: 19–29, 18–22, 18–22, 16–20

Hsinchu Municipal Gymnasium
Referees: P. Hrusa (CZE), K. Simonov (GER), S. Arisawa (JAP)

9th Place Match

29 August 2017
17:30 (UTC+8)

Report

| Canada | 96–101 | Australia |
Scoring by quarter: 40–35, 14–18, 25–26, 17–22

University of Taipei (Tianmu) Gymnasium
Referees: V. Maciulaitis (LTU), S. Lee (KOR), V. Györgyi (NOR)

=== Women's tournament ===
Preliminary Round

| Qualified for the Final eight |
| Qualified for the Placement 9th-16th |

| Team | Pld | W | L | PF | PA | PD | Pts |
|---|---|---|---|---|---|---|---|
| Russia | 3 | 3 | 0 | 189 | 167 | +22 | 6 |
| Australia | 3 | 2 | 1 | 205 | 181 | +24 | 5 |
| Lithuania | 3 | 1 | 2 | 196 | 183 | +13 | 4 |
| Argentina | 3 | 0 | 3 | 150 | 209 | −59 | 3 |

21 August 2017
20:00 (UTC+8)

Report

| Australia | 78–71 | Lithuania |
Scoring by quarter: 16–16, 26–16, 24–21, 12–18

Hsinchu Municipal Gymnasium
Referees: F.V. Barrera (CHI), K.N. Apellaniz (USA), R. Eriksson (SWE)

22 August 2017
17:30 (UTC+8)

Report

| Argentina | 47–69 | Australia |
Scoring by quarter: 8–12, 9–18, 14–12, 16–27

University of Taipei (Tianmu) Gymnasium
Referees: T. Suslov (EST), V. Györgyi (NOR), M.L. Sung (TPE)

23 August 2017
12:30 (UTC+8)

Report

| Russia | 63–58 | Australia |
Scoring by quarter: 17–17, 12–14, 14–10, 20–17

Taipei Heping Basketball Gymnasium
Referees: G.A. Todey (USA), G. Kapitany (HUN), R. Eriksson (SWE)

Quarterfinal

25 August 2017
17:30 (UTC+8)

Report

| United States | 69–76 | Australia |
Scoring by quarter: 21–13, 12–23, 12–20, 24–20

Taipei Heping Basketball Gymnasium
Referees: V. Maciulaitis (LTU), V. Györgyi (NOR), S. Lee (KOR)

Semifinal

26 August 2017
17:30 (UTC+8)

Report

| Chinese Taipei | 74–79 | Australia |
Scoring by quarter: 16–16, 22–18, 15–20, 21–25

Taipei Arena
Referees: P. Marques (POR), A.M. Del Colo (CAN), H.S. Carrizales (MEX)

Gold Medal Match

28 August 2017
20:00 (UTC+8)

Report

| Australia | 85–78 | Japan |
Scoring by quarter: 24–16, 19–17, 30–18, 12–27
| Pts: Garbin 30; Rebs: Scherf 12; Asts: Garbin 6 | | Pts: Hayashi 16; Rebs: Fujimoto 5 Asts: Yasuma 8 |

Taipei Arena
Attendance: 10000
Referees: A. Csender (ROU), J. Smiljanic (SRB), H.S. Carrizales (MEX)

== Diving ==
| Athlete | Event | Preliminaries | | Semifinals | | Final | |
| Athlete | Event | Points | Rank | Points | Rank | Points | Rank |
|---|---|---|---|---|---|---|---|
| Nicholas Malcol Jeffree | Men's Platform | 266.50 | 19Q | 310.70 | 17 | Did Not Advance | |
| Laura Elizabeth Hingston | Women's Platform | 208.40 | 18 | Did Not Advance | | | |
| Emily Kate Meaney | Women's Platform | 277.00 | 7Q | 257.30 | 11Q | 269.50 | 10 |
| Brittany Mae O'Brien | Women's Platform | 251.50 | 12Q | 305.80 | 2Q | 307.20 | 5 |
| Ruby Grace Neave | Women's 1m Springboard | 222.95 | 20 | Did Not Advance | | | |
| Ruby Grace Neave | Women's 3m Springboard | 249.40 | 17Q | 211.15 | 18 | Did Not Advance | |
| Emily Kate Meaney; Brittany Mae O'Brien | Women's Synchronized Platform | —N/a | | | | 297.84 | 2nd place, silver medalist(s) |
| Nicholas Malcol Jeffree; Brittany Mae O'Brien | Mixed Synchronized Platform | —N/a | | | | 264.54 | 4 |

== Fencing ==
| Athlete | Event | Round of 128 | Round of 64 | Round of 32 | Round of 16 | Quarterfinal | Semifinal | Final / BM | |
| Athlete | Event | Opposition Score | Opposition Score | Opposition Score | Opposition Score | Opposition Score | Opposition Score | Opposition Score | Rank |
|---|---|---|---|---|---|---|---|---|---|
| Madeleine Andersen | Women's Epee Individual | Bye | Sera Song (KOR); L 15-4 | did not advance | | | | | 56 |
| Christopher Nagle | Men's Foil Individual | —N/a | Askar Khamzin (RUS); L 15-8 | did not advance | | | | | 40 |

== Gymnastics ==
=== Artistic ===
Team

| Athlete | Event | Apparatus | | | | | | Total | Rank |
| Athlete | Event | F | PH | R | V | PB | HB | Total | Rank |
|---|---|---|---|---|---|---|---|---|---|
| Clay Isaac Mason | Men's Team | 11.250 | —N/a | | 14.300 | 10.950 | 12.600 | 49.100 | 83 |
| Michael Mercieca | Men's Team | 12.450 | 10.600 | 13.500 | 13.500 | 13.200 | 14.050 | 77.300 | 28 |
| Mitchell Morgans | Men's Team | 11.850 | 9.700 | 12.800 | 13.850 | 13.650 | 13.950 | 75.800 | 32 |
| Christopher Ian Remkes | Men's Team | 12.600 | 13.300 | —N/a | 14.500 | —N/a | | 40.400 | 91 |
| Michael John Tone | Men's Team | —N/a | 12.600 | 13.750 | —N/a | 12.200 | —N/a | 38.550 | 96 |
| Total | Men's Team | 36.900 | 36.500 | 40.050 | 42.650 | 39.050 | 40.600 | 235.750 | 11 |

Individual

| Athlete | Event | Apparatus | | | | | | Total | Rank |
| Athlete | Event | F | PH | R | V | PB | HB | Total | Rank |
|---|---|---|---|---|---|---|---|---|---|
| Michael Mercieca | Horizontal Bar | —N/a | | | | | 12.900 | 12.900 | 5 |
| Mitchell Morgans | Horizontal Bar | —N/a | | | | | 12.233 | 12.233 | 7 |
| Christopher Ian Remkes | Vault | —N/a | | | 14.116 | —N/a | | 14.116 | 5 |

=== Rhythmic ===
| Athlete | Event | Apparatus | | | | | |
| Athlete | Event | Hoop | Ball | Clubs | Ribbon | Total | Rank |
|---|---|---|---|---|---|---|---|
| Zoe Ormrod | Individual All-Around | 12.000 | 9.400 | 11.350 | 8.150 | 40.900 | 33 |
| Enid Jin Joo Sung | Individual All-Around | 12.475 | 11.350 | 12.000 | 12.100 | 47.925 | 23 |

== Judo ==
| Athlete | Event | Round of 64 | Round of 32 | Round of 16 | Quarterfinals | Repechage 32 | Repechage 16 | Repechage 8 | Final Repechage | Semifinals | Final / BM | |
| Athlete | Event | Opposition Result | Opposition Result | Opposition Result | Opposition Result | Opposition Result | Opposition Result | Opposition Result | Opposition Result | Opposition Result | Opposition Result | Rank |
|---|---|---|---|---|---|---|---|---|---|---|---|---|
| Sam Nicholas King | Men's -73 kg | Bye | Reda Bougueroua (ALG); L 12–00S1 | Bye | | | Norin Tatarescu (MDA); L 02S1–00S1 | did not advance | | | | N/A |
| Maeve Ellen Coughlan | Women's -63 kg | —N/a | Dilbar Umiraliyeva (KAZ); L 01–00 | Did Not Advance | | —N/a | Did Not Advance | | | | | N/A |
| Naomi Rachel De Bruine | Women's -70 kg | —N/a | Natascha Esmee Ausma (NED); L 01S1–00S2 | Did Not Advance | | —N/a | Did Not Advance | | | | | N/A |
| Ellen Saoirse Wright | Women's -57 kg | —N/a | Anna Righetti (ITA); L 10S1–00 | Bye | | —N/a | Oana Ricolaescu (MDA); L 10–00 | Did Not Advance | | | | N/A |

== Swimming ==
=== Men ===
| Athlete | Event | Heat | | Semifinal | | Final | |
| Athlete | Event | Time | Rank | Time | Rank | Time | Rank |
|---|---|---|---|---|---|---|---|
| Nicholas Morris Brown | 50m Butterfly | 25.24 | 8 | did not advance | | | |
| Nicholas Morris Brown | 200m Butterfly | 2:00.39 | 6Q | 2:01.19 | 8 | did not advance | |
| Nicholas Morris Brown | 100m Butterfly | DNS | N/A | did not advance | | | |
| Kai Graeme Edwards | Marathon (10 km) | —N/a | | | | DNS | N/A |
| Brayden Noel Do McCarthy | 50m Butterfly | 24.08 | 4Q | 24.02 | 6 | did not advance | |
| Brayden Noel Do McCarthy | 200m Freestyle | DNS | N/A | did not advance | | | |
| Brayden Noel Do McCarthy | 100m Freestyle | 50.65 | 3 | did not advance | | | |
| Brayden Noel Do McCarthy | 100m Butterfly | 53.46 | 6 | did not advance | | | |
| Brayden Noel Do McCarthy | 50m Freestyle | 22.95 | 8 | did not advance | | | |
| Alex Stewart Da Milligan | 100m Backstroke | 1:02.38 | 2 | did not advance | | | |
| Alex Stewart Da Milligan | 200m Backstroke | 2:13.94 | 6Q | 2:13.37 | 6 | did not advance | |
| Alex Stewart Da Milligan | 50m Breaststroke | 29.32 | 3 | did not advance | | | |
| Alex Stewart Da Milligan | 400m Individual Medley | DNS | N/A | did not advance | | | |
| Joshua Allan Parrish | 400m Freestyle | 3:53.89 | 7 | did not advance | | | |
| Joshua Allan Parrish | 1500m Freestyle | 15:27.71 | 6 | did not advance | | | |
| Joshua Allan Parrish | 800m Freestyle | 8:03.77 | 1 | did not advance | | | |
| Oliver Campbell Signorini | Marathon (10 km) | —N/a | | | | DNS | N/A |
| William Thomas Stockwell | 100m Freestyle | 50.15 | 6 | did not advance | | | |
| William Thomas Stockwell | 50m Freestyle | 22.73 | 6 | did not advance | | | |
| Benjamin Mark Treffers | 100m Backstroke | 54.82 | 3Q | 54.79 | 3Q | 54.39 | 5 |
| Benjamin Mark Treffers | 50m Backstroke | 25.38 | 3Q | 25.34 | 3Q | 25.21 | 7 |
| William Thomas Stockwell; Brayden Noel Do McCarthy; Alex Stewart Da Milligan; Joshua Allan Parrish; Nicholas Morris Brown | 4x100m Freestyle Relay | 3:23.40 | 8 | did not advance | | | |
| Benjamin Mark Treffers; William Thomas Stockwell; Brayden Noel Do McCarthy; Alex Stewart Da Milligan | 4x100m Medley Relay | 3:39.73 | 1 | did not advance | | | |
| Kai Graeme Edwards; Brayden Noel Do McCarthy; Alex Stewart Da Milligan; Joshua Allan Parrish | 4x200m Freestyle Relay | DNS | N/A | did not advance | | | |

=== Women ===
| Athlete | Event | Heat | | Semifinal | | Final | |
| Athlete | Event | Time | Rank | Time | Rank | Time | Rank |
|---|---|---|---|---|---|---|---|
| Meg Elizabeth Bailey | 400m Individual Medley | 4:48.87 | 5 | did not advance | | | |
| Hayley Victoria Baker | 200m Backstroke | DNS | N/A | did not advance | | | |
| Hayley Victoria Baker | 100m Backstroke | 1:01.33 | 1Q | 1:02.19 | 7 | did not advance | |
| Hayley Victoria Baker | 50m Backstroke | 29.04 | 5Q | 28.97 | 7 | did not advance | |
| Gemma Jane Isab Cooney | 50m Butterfly | 27.68 | 7 | did not advance | | | |
| Gemma Jane Isab Cooney | 100m Freestyle | 55.79 | 5Q | 55.54 | 7 | did not advance | |
| Gemma Jane Isab Cooney | 100m Butterfly | 1:00.06 | 6Q | 59.77 | 6 | did not advance | |
| Gemma Jane Isab Cooney | 200m Freestyle | 2:01.86 | 5Q | 2:00.72 | 6 | did not advance | |
| Gemma Jane Isab Cooney | 50m Freestyle | 26.13 | 5 | did not advance | | | |
| Abbey Grace Harkin | 100m Breaststroke | 1:10.39 | 4Q | 1:10.32 | 8 | did not advance | |
| Abbey Grace Harkin | 200m Individual Medley | 2:17.36 | 4'Q | 2:16.98 | 6 | did not advance | |
| Abbey Grace Harkin | 200m Freestyle | 2:04.14 | 7 | did not advance | | | |
| Abbey Grace Harkin | 50m Freestyle | 26.63 | 6 | did not advance | | | |
| Kareena Jane Lee | 1500m Freestyle | 16:46.63 | 5 | did not advance | | | |
| Kareena Jane Lee | 800m Freestyle | 8:44.74 | 6 | did not advance | | | |
| Kareena Jane Lee | Marathon (10 km) | —N/a | | | | DNS | N/A |
| Kiah Shenea Melverton | 400m Individual Medley | 4:47.41 | 6 | did not advance | | | |
| Kiah Shenea Melverton | 1500m Freestyle | 16:24.95 | 3Q | —N/a | | 16:15.83 | 4 |
| Kiah Shenea Melverton | 800m Freestyle | 8:36.21 | 3Q | —N/a | | 8:32.46 | 4 |
| Kiah Shenea Melverton | 400m Freestyle | 4:12.33 | 1Q | —N/a | | 4:12.42 | 6 |
| Leiston Jane Pickett | 100m Breaststroke | 1:08.94 | 1Q | 1:08.26 | 2Q | 1:08.21 | 6 |
| Leiston Jane Pickett | 200m Breaststroke | 2:34.83 | 6 | did not advance | | | |
| Leiston Jane Pickett | 50m Breaststroke | 31.31 | 1Q | 31.16 | 1Q | 30.82 | 2nd place, silver medalist(s) |
| Laura Jane Taylor | 100m Freestyle | 56.38 | 6 | did not advance | | | |
| Laura Jane Taylor | 200m Butterfly | 2:13.40 | 1Q | 2:11.79 | 2Q | 2:12.74 | 8 |
| Emily Rachael Washer | 50m Butterfly | 27.39 | 5Q | 27.39 | 8 | did not advance | |
| Emily Rachael Washer | 100m Butterfly | 1:01.73 | 5 | did not advance | | | |
| Emily Rachael Washer | 200m Butterfly | 2:17.36 | 6 | did not advance | | | |
| Sian Monique Whittaker | 200m Backstroke | 2:10.55 | 2Q | 2:10.10 | 1Q | 2:09.50 | 1st place, gold medalist(s) |
| Sian Monique Whittaker | 100m Backstroke | 1:00.91 | 2Q | 1:00.53 | 1Q | 1:00.14 | 1st place, gold medalist(s) |
| Sian Monique Whittaker | Gemma Jane Isab Cooney; Abbey Grace Harkin; Laura Jane Taylor; Emily Rachael Washer; Sian Monique Whittaker | 4x100m Freestyle Relay | 3:45.09 | 4 | did not advance | | |
| Hayley Victoria Baker; Abbey Grace Harkin; Gemma Jane Isab Cooney; Leiston Jane Pickett; Sian Monique Whittaker | 4x100m Medley Relay | 4:05.10 | 1Q | —N/a | | 4:03.58 | 4 |
| Gemma Jane Isab Cooney; Abbey Grace Harkin; Kiah Shenea Melverton; Laura Jane Taylor | 4x200m Freestyle Relay | 8:04.52 | 3Q | —N/a | | 8:04.76 | 7 |

== Table Tennis ==
| Athlete | Event | Group Stage | | | Round of 128 | Round of 64 | Round of 32 | Round of 16 | Quarterfinals | Semifinals | Final / BM | |
| Athlete | Event | Opposition Result | Opposition Result | Opposition Result | Opposition Result | Opposition Result | Opposition Result | Opposition Result | Opposition Result | Opposition Result | Opposition Result | Rank |
|---|---|---|---|---|---|---|---|---|---|---|---|---|
| Jake Ian Duffy | Men's Singles | Karma Tashi (BHU); W 3-0 | Lars Frederik Banning (NED); W 3-0 | —N/a | | Patryk Zatowka (POL); L 1-4 | Did Not Advance | | | | | |
| Heming Hu | Men's Singles | Imantha Udanjay Kulappuwa Wadu (SRI); W 3-0 | Adam Valentine Harrison (GBR); L 2-3 | —N/a | | Did Not Advance | | | | | | |
| Kane Douglas Townsend | Men's Singles | Junhee An (KOR); L 0-3 | Jit Kiat Tay (SGP); W 3-0 | —N/a | | Did Not Advance | | | | | | |
| Erny Yi-Yi Tsao | Men's Singles | Billy Xu Ding (USA); W 3-2 | Chak Iat Kou (MAC); W 3-2 | —N/a | | Yuya Oshima (JPN); L 0-4 | Did Not Advance | | | | | |
| Duffy/Tsao | Men's Doubles | —N/a | | | | Ismailov/Merzlikin (RUS); L 0-3 | Did Not Advance | | | | | |
| Hu/Townsend | Men's Doubles | —N/a | | | | Figel/Mego (SVK); L 2-3 | Did Not Advance | | | | | |
| Duffy; Hu; Townsend; Tsao | Men's Team | South Korea (KOR); L 0-3 | Canada (CAN); W 3-1 | Poland (POL); L 2-3 | Did Not Advance | | | | | | | |
| Sarah Qianqi Tan | Women's Singles | Gaukhar Almagambetova (KAZ); L 1-3 | Marion Tamm (EST); W 3-0 | —N/a | | Did Not Advance | | | | | | |
| Rossalean To | Women's Singles | Yessica Natalia Sierpe Gomez (ARG); W 3-0 | Chloe Anna Thomas (GBR); L 0-3 | —N/a | | Did Not Advance | | | | | | |
| Antong Angel Zhang | Women's Singles | Shahnoza Barotova (TJK); W 3-0 | Nai Xin Jiang (GBR); L 2-3 | —N/a | | Did Not Advance | | | | | | |
| Tan/Zhang | Women's Doubles | —N/a | | | | Guisnel/Loeuillette (FRA); L 0-3 | Did Not Advance | | | | | |
| Tan; To; Zhang | Women's Team | Singapore (SGP); L 0-3 | Canada (CAN); L 1-3 | Poland (POL); L 0-3 | Did Not Advance | | | | | | | |
| Hu/Zhang | Mixed Doubles | —N/a | | | Bye | Robinot/ Gasnier (FRA); L 0-3 | Did Not Advance | | | | | |
| Townsend/Tan | Mixed Doubles | —N/a | | | Bye | Merzlikin/Noskova (RUS); L 0-3 | Did Not Advance | | | | | |

== Taekwondo ==
| Athlete | Event | Round of 64 | Round of 32 | Round of 16 | Quarterfinals | Semifinals | Final / BM | |
| Athlete | Event | Opposition Result | Opposition Result | Opposition Result | Opposition Result | Opposition Result | Opposition Result | Rank |
|---|---|---|---|---|---|---|---|---|
| Thomas Alexander Afonczenko | Men's -68 kg | Bye | Nursultan Mamayev (KAZ); L 6-16 | Did Not Advance | | | | |
| William George Afonczenko | Men's -58 kg | Bye | Aleksandr Galaktionov (EST); W 19-12 | Tawin Hanprab (THA); L 10-18 | Did Not Advance | | | |
| Thomas Blake Auger | Men's -63 kg | Bye | Chia-Hsin Ho (TPE); L 6-27 | Did Not Advance | | | | |
| Stephanie Jane Freeman | Women's -62 kg | Bye | Jisoo Moon (KOR); L 2-22 | Did Not Advance | | | | |
| Bailey Malcolm Lewis | Men's -54 kg | —N/a | Bye | Lok Chun Jonathan Yeung (HKG); W 15-3 | Gashim Magomedov (AZE); W 12-10 | Armin Hadipour Seighalani (IRI); L 1-21 | Did Not Advance | 3rd place, bronze medalist(s) |
| Jack Marek Marton | Men's -74 kg | Bye | Kostiantyn Konstenevch (UKR); W 31-15 | Boris Lieskovsky (SVK); W 9-6 | Jaysen Scott Ishida (USA); L 9-12 | Did Not Advance | | |
| Adam Leslie Meyers | Men's +87 kg | —N/a | Bye | Tzu-Yi Tseng (TPE); L 1-7 | Did Not Advance | | | |
| Lisa Elizabeth Munro | Women's -67 kg | Bye | Iris Jovic Vujakovic (SRB); L WDR-13 | Did Not Advance | | | | |
| Catherine Mala Risbey | Women's -57 kg | Bye | Yu-Chuang Chen (TPE); L 3-5 | Did Not Advance | | | | |
| Keshena Janice Waterford | Women's -49 kg | —N/a | Bye | Seema Kannaujiya (IND); L DSQ-0 | Did Not Advance | | | |
| Katarina Pavkovic; Kyle John Wilson Knowles | Mixed Pair Poomsae | —N/a | | | | 75.3 | Did Not Advance | 14 |

== Tennis ==
| Athlete | Event | Round 1 | Round 2 | Round 3 | Round 4 | Quarterfinals | Semifinals | Final / BM | |
| Athlete | Event | Opposition Score | Opposition Score | Opposition Score | Opposition Score | Opposition Score | Opposition Score | Opposition Score | Rank |
|---|---|---|---|---|---|---|---|---|---|
| Annabelle Andrinopoulos | Women's Singles | Bye | Krisztina Kapitany (HUN); W 2-0 | Ya-Hsuan Lee (TPE); L 0-2 | Did Not Advance | | | | |
| Nicholas Chisol Horton | Men's Singles | Bye | Jack Findel-Hawkins (GBR); L 0-2 | Did Not Advance | | | | | |
| Danielle Elizabeth Wagland | Women's Singles | Bye | Josefina Surraco (ARG); W 2-0 | Kai-Chen Chang (TPE); L 0-2 | Did Not Advance | | | | |
| Andrinopoulos/Wagland | Women's Doubles | Jespersen/Therkildsen (DEN); W 2-0 | Arbuthnott/Nicholls (GBR); L 0-2 | Did Not Advance | | | | | |
| Horton/Wagland | Mixed Doubles | Bye | Pivovarova/Muzaev (RUS); L 0-2 | Did Not Advance | | | | | |

== Volleyball ==
=== Men's tournament ===
Preliminary Round

| Pos | Team | Pld | W | L | Pts | SW | SL | SR | SPW | SPL | SPR | Qualification |
|---|---|---|---|---|---|---|---|---|---|---|---|---|
| 1 | Russia | 5 | 5 | 0 | 15 | 15 | 1 | 15.000 | 411 | 335 | 1.227 | Quarterfinals |
| 2 | Czech Republic | 5 | 4 | 1 | 11 | 12 | 6 | 2.000 | 415 | 366 | 1.134 | Quarterfinals |
| 3 | Romania | 5 | 3 | 2 | 9 | 11 | 7 | 1.571 | 427 | 403 | 1.060 | 9th–16th place |
| 4 | Hong Kong | 5 | 2 | 3 | 5 | 8 | 13 | 0.615 | 411 | 464 | 0.886 | 9th–16th place |
| 5 | Australia | 5 | 1 | 4 | 4 | 6 | 13 | 0.462 | 420 | 429 | 0.979 | 17th–22nd place |
| 6 | Chile | 5 | 0 | 5 | 1 | 3 | 15 | 0.200 | 335 | 422 | 0.794 | 17th–22nd place |

| Date | Time | | Score | | Set 1 | Set 2 | Set 3 | Set 4 | Set 5 | Total | Report |
|---|---|---|---|---|---|---|---|---|---|---|---|
| 20 Aug | 15:00 | Czech Republic | 3–0 | Australia | 25–15 | 25–23 | 25–20 | | | 75–58 | P2 P3 |
| 21 Aug | 15:00 | Australia | 0–3 | Russia | 31–33 | 21–25 | 20–25 | | | 72–83 | P2 P3 |
| 22 Aug | 18:00 | Hong Kong | 3–2 | Australia | 18–25 | 16–25 | 25–23 | 25–22 | 15–13 | 99–108 | P2 P3 |
| 24 Aug | 15:00 | Chile | 1–3 | Australia | 8–25 | 25–14 | 21–25 | 19–25 | | 73–89 | P2 P3 |
| 25 Aug | 20:00 | Australia | 1–3 | Romania | 24–26 | 25–23 | 22–25 | 22–25 | | 93–99 | P2 P3 |

17th–22nd place quarterfinals

| Date | Time | | Score | | Set 1 | Set 2 | Set 3 | Set 4 | Set 5 | Total | Report |
|---|---|---|---|---|---|---|---|---|---|---|---|
| 27 Aug | 15:00 | United Arab Emirates | 0–3 | Australia | 22–25 | 16–25 | 17–25 | | | 55–75 | P2 P3 |

17th–20th place semifinals

| Date | Time | | Score | | Set 1 | Set 2 | Set 3 | Set 4 | Set 5 | Total | Report |
|---|---|---|---|---|---|---|---|---|---|---|---|
| 28 Aug | 13:00 | United States | 3–1 | Australia | 15–25 | 25–20 | 25–21 | 29–27 | | 94–93 | P2 P3 |

19th place match

| Date | Time | | Score | | Set 1 | Set 2 | Set 3 | Set 4 | Set 5 | Total | Report |
|---|---|---|---|---|---|---|---|---|---|---|---|
| 29 Aug | 13:00 | Australia | 3–0 | Cyprus | 28–26 | 25–19 | 25–16 | | | 78–61 | P2 P3 |

== Water Polo ==
=== Men's tournament ===
Preliminary round

| Team | Pld | W | D | L | GF | GA | GD | Pts |
|---|---|---|---|---|---|---|---|---|
| Netherlands | 3 | 3 | 0 | 0 | 36 | 14 | +22 | 6 |
| Italy | 3 | 2 | 0 | 1 | 31 | 15 | +16 | 4 |
| Australia | 3 | 1 | 0 | 2 | 21 | 22 | -1 | 2 |
| Argentina | 3 | 0 | 0 | 3 | 13 | 50 | –37 | 0 |

| 18 August 2017; 13:00 | Report | Australia | 13–6 | Argentina | Hsinchu County Natatorium; Referees: Hiroaki Ogino (JPN); Michael Baty (RSA) |
| 18 August 2017; 13:00 | Report | Score by quarters: 3–1, 2–1, 3–1, 5–3 | | | Hsinchu County Natatorium; Referees: Hiroaki Ogino (JPN); Michael Baty (RSA) |
| 18 August 2017; 13:00 | Report | Trabinger 3 | Goals | Olivieri 2 | Hsinchu County Natatorium; Referees: Hiroaki Ogino (JPN); Michael Baty (RSA) |

| 20 August 2017; 13:00 | Report | Italy | 7–3 | Australia | Hsinchu County Natatorium; Referees: Maxim Gerasimov (GBR); Attila Marosvari (HUN) |
| 20 August 2017; 13:00 | Report | Score by quarters: 1–1, 4–1, 1–1, 1–0 | | | Hsinchu County Natatorium; Referees: Maxim Gerasimov (GBR); Attila Marosvari (HUN) |
| 20 August 2017; 13:00 | Report | Bruni 3 | Goals | Trabinger 2 | Hsinchu County Natatorium; Referees: Maxim Gerasimov (GBR); Attila Marosvari (HUN) |

| 21 August 2017; 13:00 | Report | Australia | 5–9 | Netherlands | Hsinchu County Natatorium; Referees: Marie Deslieres (CAN); Humberto Navarro (USA) |
| 21 August 2017; 13:00 | Report | Score by quarters: 1–4, 3–1, 1–1, 0–3 | | | Hsinchu County Natatorium; Referees: Marie Deslieres (CAN); Humberto Navarro (USA) |
| 21 August 2017; 13:00 | Report | Brooks 3 | Goals | Lindhout 3 | Hsinchu County Natatorium; Referees: Marie Deslieres (CAN); Humberto Navarro (USA) |

Round of 16

| 23 August 2017; 17:00 | Report | Australia | 9–15 | Japan | Hsinchu County Natatorium; Referees: Pascal Bouchez (FRA); Igor Virijević (SRB) |
| 23 August 2017; 17:00 | Report | Score by quarters: 2–3, 3–2, 2–5, 2–5 | | | Hsinchu County Natatorium; Referees: Pascal Bouchez (FRA); Igor Virijević (SRB) |
| 23 August 2017; 17:00 | Report | three players 2 | Goals | Arai 4 | Hsinchu County Natatorium; Referees: Pascal Bouchez (FRA); Igor Virijević (SRB) |

9th–16th place quarterfinals

| 25 August 2017; 13:30 | Report | Australia | 6–5 | Argentina | Hsinchu County Natatorium; Referees: David Couper (NZL); Damien Taylor (GBR) |
| 25 August 2017; 13:30 | Report | Score by quarters: 2–1, 2–2, 1–1, 1–1 | | | Hsinchu County Natatorium; Referees: David Couper (NZL); Damien Taylor (GBR) |
| 25 August 2017; 13:30 | Report | Reeves 2 | Goals | Galimberti 2 | Hsinchu County Natatorium; Referees: David Couper (NZL); Damien Taylor (GBR) |

9th–12th place semifinals

| 27 August 2017; 13:30 | Report | United States | 8–4 | Australia | Hsinchu County Natatorium; Referees: Sebastien Dervieux (FRA); Marco Ercoli (ITA) |
| 27 August 2017; 13:30 | Report | Score by quarters: 2–1, 3–0, 1–2, 2–1 | | | Hsinchu County Natatorium; Referees: Sebastien Dervieux (FRA); Marco Ercoli (ITA) |
| 27 August 2017; 13:30 | Report | three players 2 | Goals | Flanagan 2 | Hsinchu County Natatorium; Referees: Sebastien Dervieux (FRA); Marco Ercoli (ITA) |

11th place match

| 29 August 2017; 12:00 | Report | South Korea | 3–18 | Australia | National Taiwan Sport University Arena; Referees: Damien Taylor (GBR); Jean-Francois Morisseau (CAN) |
| 29 August 2017; 12:00 | Report | Score by quarters: 1–5, 2–1, 0–7, 0–5 | | | National Taiwan Sport University Arena; Referees: Damien Taylor (GBR); Jean-Francois Morisseau (CAN) |
| 29 August 2017; 12:00 | Report | three players 1 | Goals | Brooks 5 | National Taiwan Sport University Arena; Referees: Damien Taylor (GBR); Jean-Francois Morisseau (CAN) |

=== Women's tournament ===
Preliminary Round

| Team | Pld | W | D | L | GF | GA | GD | Pts |
|---|---|---|---|---|---|---|---|---|
| United States | 5 | 5 | 0 | 0 | 95 | 14 | +81 | 10 |
| Italy | 5 | 4 | 0 | 1 | 53 | 34 | +19 | 8 |
| France | 5 | 3 | 0 | 2 | 43 | 38 | +5 | 6 |
| Australia | 5 | 2 | 0 | 3 | 47 | 37 | -10 | 4 |
| Greece | 5 | 1 | 0 | 4 | 22 | 62 | –40 | 2 |
| Argentina | 5 | 0 | 0 | 5 | 15 | 80 | –65 | 0 |

| 19 August 2017; 09:00 | Report | Australia | 10–3 | Greece | Taipei Songshan Sports Center Swimming Pool; Referees: Balazs Szekely (HUN); Irfan Sadekov (RUS) |
| 19 August 2017; 09:00 | Report | Score by quarters: 2–1, 3–0, 4–1, 1–1 | | | Taipei Songshan Sports Center Swimming Pool; Referees: Balazs Szekely (HUN); Irfan Sadekov (RUS) |
| 19 August 2017; 09:00 | Report | Williams 4 | Goals | Kontogianni 2 | Taipei Songshan Sports Center Swimming Pool; Referees: Balazs Szekely (HUN); Irfan Sadekov (RUS) |

| 20 August 2017; 17:00 | Report | Australia | 6–8 | Italy | Taipei Songshan Sports Center Swimming Pool; Referees: Ursula Wengenroth (SUI); Vladimir Gerzanich (RUS) |
| 20 August 2017; 17:00 | Report | Score by quarters: 2–3, 1–2, 3–1, 0–2 | | | Taipei Songshan Sports Center Swimming Pool; Referees: Ursula Wengenroth (SUI); Vladimir Gerzanich (RUS) |
| 20 August 2017; 17:00 | Report | Carter 3 | Goals | Morvillo 2 | Taipei Songshan Sports Center Swimming Pool; Referees: Ursula Wengenroth (SUI); Vladimir Gerzanich (RUS) |

| 22 August 2017; 17:00 | Report | United States | 17–3 | Australia | Taipei Songshan Sports Center Swimming Pool; Referees: Irfan Sadekov (RUS); Damien Taylor (GBR) |
| 22 August 2017; 17:00 | Report | Score by quarters: 4–1, 5–1, 3–0, 5–1 | | | Taipei Songshan Sports Center Swimming Pool; Referees: Irfan Sadekov (RUS); Damien Taylor (GBR) |
| 22 August 2017; 17:00 | Report | Klass 3 | Goals | three players 1 | Taipei Songshan Sports Center Swimming Pool; Referees: Irfan Sadekov (RUS); Damien Taylor (GBR) |

| 24 August 2017; 15:40 | Report | Australia | 6–8 | France | Taipei Songshan Sports Center Swimming Pool; Referees: Marie Deslieres (CAN); Ursula Wengenroth (SUI) |
| 24 August 2017; 15:40 | Report | Score by quarters: 2–1, 0–2, 2–4, 2–1 | | | Taipei Songshan Sports Center Swimming Pool; Referees: Marie Deslieres (CAN); Ursula Wengenroth (SUI) |
| 24 August 2017; 15:40 | Report | Casey 3 | Goals | Millot 3 | Taipei Songshan Sports Center Swimming Pool; Referees: Marie Deslieres (CAN); Ursula Wengenroth (SUI) |

| 25 August 2017; 17:00 | Report | Australia | 22–1 | Argentina | Taipei Songshan Sports Center Swimming Pool; Referees: Maxim Gerasimov (GBR); Balazs Szekely (HUN) |
| 25 August 2017; 17:00 | Report | Score by quarters: 5–0, 5–0, 8–0, 4–1 | | | Taipei Songshan Sports Center Swimming Pool; Referees: Maxim Gerasimov (GBR); Balazs Szekely (HUN) |
| 25 August 2017; 17:00 | Report | Hille 5 | Goals | Comba 1 | Taipei Songshan Sports Center Swimming Pool; Referees: Maxim Gerasimov (GBR); Balazs Szekely (HUN) |

Quarterfinals

| 26 August 2017; 16:30 | Report | Japan | 17–15 (PSO) | Italy | Taipei Songshan Sports Center Swimming Pool; Referees: Andrew Carney(AUS); Marie Deslieres (CAN) |
| 26 August 2017; 16:30 | Report | Score by quarters: 4–2, 2–4, 3–4, 3–2 PSO: 5–3 | | | Taipei Songshan Sports Center Swimming Pool; Referees: Andrew Carney(AUS); Marie Deslieres (CAN) |
| 26 August 2017; 16:30 | Report | Suzuki, Arima 3 | Goals | Galardi 4 | Taipei Songshan Sports Center Swimming Pool; Referees: Andrew Carney(AUS); Marie Deslieres (CAN) |

5th-8th semifinals

| 28 August 2017; 13:30 | Report | Australia | 6–5 | France | National Taiwan Sport University Arena; Referees: Stephen O'Brien (IRL); Leonadro Ceccarelli (ITA) |
| 28 August 2017; 13:30 | Report | Score by quarters: 0–4, 1–0, 2–1, 3–0 | | | National Taiwan Sport University Arena; Referees: Stephen O'Brien (IRL); Leonadro Ceccarelli (ITA) |
| 28 August 2017; 13:30 | Report | Morrissey 5 | Goals | five players 1 | National Taiwan Sport University Arena; Referees: Stephen O'Brien (IRL); Leonadro Ceccarelli (ITA) |

5th place match

| 29 August 2017; 16:30 | Report | Australia | 8–16 | Canada | National Taiwan Sport University Arena; Referees: Amber Drury (USA); Vladimir Gerzanich (RUS) |
| 29 August 2017; 16:30 | Report | Score by quarters: 1–5, 3–4, 1–4, 3–3 | | | National Taiwan Sport University Arena; Referees: Amber Drury (USA); Vladimir Gerzanich (RUS) |
| 29 August 2017; 16:30 | Report | Morrissey 3 | Goals | Lemay-Lavoie 3 | National Taiwan Sport University Arena; Referees: Amber Drury (USA); Vladimir Gerzanich (RUS) |

== Weightlifting ==
| Athlete | Event | Snatch | | Clean & Jerk | | Total | Rank |
| Athlete | Event | Result | Rank | Result | Rank | Total | Rank |
|---|---|---|---|---|---|---|---|
| Beau James Garrett | Men's 85 kg | 130 | 16 | 165 | 12 | 295 | 12 |
| Cait Maree Haniver | Women's 69 kg | 77 | 18 | 97 | 19 | 174 | 19 |
| Ling Wei Phillip Liao | Men's 62 kg | 92 | 12 | 117 | 10 | 209 | 10 |
| Joshua Thomas Quinn | Men's 105 kg | 127 | 15 | 150 | 15 | 277 | 15 |
| Liam Christopher Saxby | Men's 85 kg | 122 | 16 | 146 | 16 | 268 | 16 |

== Wushu ==
| Athlete | Event | Pool Round | |
| Athlete | Event | Score | Rank |
|---|---|---|---|
| Elizabeth Hoong Lim | Women's Taolu - Nanquan & Nandao | 8.30 | 11 |
| Jessica Haan Yu Lim | Women's Taolu - Changquan | 8.32 | 11 |
| Joshua Chun Hon Lim | Men's Taolu - Taijiquan & Taijijian | 8.25 | 11 |
| Eda Tan Yiet Pui | Women's Taolu - Jianshu & Qiangshu | 7.95 | 7 |
