= Canada at the 2017 Summer Universiade =

- IOC code: CAN
- NOC: Canadian Olympic Committee
- Website: olympic.ca

in Taipei, Taiwan 19 – 30 August 2017
- Competitors: 275 in 16 sports
- Medals Ranked 16th: Gold 4 Silver 5 Bronze 4 Total 13

Summer Universiade appearances
- 1959; 1961; 1963; 1965; 1967; 1970; 1973; 1975; 1977; 1979; 1981; 1983; 1985; 1987; 1989; 1991; 1993; 1995; 1997; 1999; 2001; 2003; 2005; 2007; 2009; 2011; 2013; 2015; 2017; 2019; 2021; 2025; 2027

Canada participated at the 2017 Summer Universiade, in Taipei, Taiwan.

== Competitors ==
The following table lists Canada's delegation per sport and gender.

Sport	Men	Women	Total
Athletics	25	26	51
Badminton	5	6	11
Basketball	12	12	24
Diving	2	3	5
Fencing	0	2	2
Football	20	20	40
Golf	3	3	6
Gymnastics	5	7	12
Swimming	10	13	23
Table tennis	5	5	10
Taekwondo	9	12	21
Volleyball	12	12	24
Water polo	13	13	26
Weightlifting	8	7	15
Wushu	3	2	5
Total	132	143	275

== Medal summary ==
=== Medal by sports ===
Medals by sport
Sport	1st place, gold medalist(s)	2nd place, silver medalist(s)	3rd place, bronze medalist(s)	Total
Athletics	1	2	0	3
Diving	0	1	1	2
Gymnastics Artistic	2	1	2	5
Swimming	1	1	0	2
Weightlifting	0	0	1	1
Total	4	5	4	13

== Athletics ==
=== Men ===
==== Track Events ====
Athlete	Event	Round 1		Round 2		Semifinal		Final	
Athlete	Event	Result	Rank	Result	Rank	Result	Rank	Result	Rank
Benjamin Kweku Ayesu Attah	400m	47.65	2Q	—N/a		46.23	2Q	46.53	5
Corey James Hen Bellemore	1500m	3:46.95	5	did not advance					
Evan Eric Willi Esselink	10000m	—N/a						31:18.20	13
John Eamon Gay	3000m Steeplechase	—N/a						8:50.45	11
Nathaniel Keena George	400m	46.91	1Q	—N/a		46.47	3	did not advance	
Sekou Mohamed Kaba	110m Hurdles	14.07	2Q	—N/a		13.82	5q	13.87	7
James Kenneth Linde	100m	10.59	2Q	10.67	6	did not advance			
James Kenneth Linde	200m	21.07	2Q	—N/a		20.80	3q	20.96	2nd place, silver medalist(s)
Gregory Scott W Mac Neill	400m Hurdles	DSQ	—N/a	did not advance					
Oluwasegun Vict Makinde	100m	10.58	4	did not advance					
Blair Andrew Morgan	Half Marathon	—N/a						1:13:17	24
Ingvar Mackenzi Moseley	110m Hurdles	14.36	6	did not advance					
Cole Henry Andr Peterson	1500m	3:50.12	3Q	—N/a				3:47.95	10
Ross Clayton Proudfoot	5000m	14:45.75	8	did not advance					
Lucanus Robinson	200m	22.21	4	did not advance					
Tyler Jordan Smith	800m	1:52.25	1Q	—N/a		1:50.90	7	did not advance	
Kevin James Tree	10000m	—N/a						31:00.31	9
Ayesu Attah; George; Kaba; Linde; Mac Neill; Makinde; Moseley	4x100m Relay	40.01	3	did not advance					
Ayesu Attah; George; Linde; Mac Neill; Makinde	4x400m Relay	3:08.86	3q	—N/a				3:11.09	6

==== Field Events ====
Athlete	Event	Qualification		Final	
Athlete	Event	Distance	Position	Distance	Position
Spencer Allen	Pole Vault	4.90	8	Did Not Advance	
Sean Adam Cate	High Jump	2.10	9	Did Not Advance	
Stevens Dorcelus	Long Jump	7.09	14	Did Not Advance	
Evan G Karakolis	Javelin	62.98	13	Did Not Advance	
John Krzyszkowski	Javelin	65.10	12	Did Not Advance	
Peter Austin Millman	Shot Put	16.25	8	Did Not Advance	
Sullivan Tate Parker	Shot Put	17.14	8	Did Not Advance	
Deryk Tsuyoshi Theodore	Pole Vault	5.30	=2Q	5.10	10

==== Combined Events ====
Decathlon

Athlete	Event	100 m	LJ	SP	HJ	400 m	110H	DT	PV	JT	1500 m	Final	Rank
James Turner	Result	11.01	7.25	13.69	1.83	49.13	DSQ	41.14	4.20	59.48	4:34.76	6754	12
James Turner	Points	858	874	709	653	855	0	688	673	730	714	6754	12

=== Women ===
==== Track Events ====
Athlete	Event	Round 1		Round 2		Semifinal		Final	
Athlete	Event	Result	Rank	Result	Rank	Result	Rank	Result	Rank
Rachel Aubry	800m	2:06.08	5q	—N/a		2:04.79	6	Did Not Advance	
Kelsey Ellen Balkwill	400m Hurdles	58.75	3	Did Not Advance					
Karelle Edwards	100m Hurdles	13.86	5q	—N/a		DNF	—N/a	Did Not Advance	
Genevieve Lynn Lalonde	3000m Steeplechase	—N/a						DNS	—N/a
Sarah Macpherson	1500m	4:20.45	5q	—N/a				4:22.77	10
Nyoka Shondy Pe Maxwell	200m	24.46	5	Did Not Advance					
Jessica Marie O'Connell	5000m	—N/a						15:50.96	2nd place, silver medalist(s)
Micha Powell	400m	54.55	3Q	—N/a		55.22	4	did not advance	
Aiyanna Brigitt Stiverne	400m	53.06	2Q	—N/a		52.03	1Q	52.33	4
Claire Ann Sumner	10000m	—N/a						34:41.24	8
Tijuana Kxante Thevenin	100m Hurdles	13.98	5q	—N/a		13.96	6	did not advance	
Leah Janine Walkeden	100m	12.04	4q	11.93	5	did not advance			
Jenna Rae Eilee Westaway	800m	2:05.80	2Q	—N/a		2:04.59	6	did not advance	
Jellissa S Westney	100m	11.94	2Q	12.00	7	did not advance			
Regan Leanne Ga Yee	1500m	4:19.97	5q	—N/a				4:22.65	9
Latrace; Maxwell; Stiverne; Thevenin; Walkeden; Westney	4x100m Relay	45.25	3	did not advance					
Balkwill; Maxwell; Powell; Stiverne; Walkeden; Westney	4x400m Relay	3:34.80	3Q	—N/a				3:36.44	4

==== Field Events ====
Athlete	Event	Qualification		Final	
Athlete	Event	Distance	Position	Distance	Position
Robin Arlene Bone	Pole Vault	NM	—N/a	did not advance	
Brittany Ann Ni Crew	Shot Put	17.48	2q	18.34	1st place, gold medalist(s)
Agnes Rachel Esser	Discus	52.69	4q	49.93	12
Agnes Rachel Esser	Hammer	57.61	10	did not advance	
Sandra Diane Latrace	Long Jump	5.91	7	did not advance	
Angela Marie Mercurio	Triple Jump	12.64	6	did not advance	
Sarah Dawn Mitton	Shot Put	15.59	4q	16.32	10
Ashley Elizabeth Pryke	Javelin	48.41	13	did not advance	
Paige Ashley Ridout	Pole Vault	4.00	5Q	4.20	7
Jaimee Lynn Springer	Javelin	45.61	14	did not advance	

==== Combined Events ====
Heptathlon

Athlete	Event	100H	HJ	SP	200 m	LJ	JT	800 m	Final	Rank
Dallyssa Jeline Huggins	Result	15.54	1.74	12.78	26.32	5.19	34.24	2:09.33	5300	6
Dallyssa Jeline Huggins	Points	772	903	713	769	612	557	974	5300	6
Nicole Corrie Oudenaarden	Result	DSQ	1.71	13.83	25.68	5.70	40.93	2:21.18	4727	11
Nicole Corrie Oudenaarden	Points	0	867	783	825	759	685	808	4727	11

== Badminton ==
=== Singles and doubles ===
Athlete	Event	Round of 128	Round of 64	Round of 32	Round of 16	Quarterfinal	Semifinal	Final / BM	
Athlete	Event	Opposition Score	Opposition Score	Opposition Score	Opposition Score	Opposition Score	Opposition Score	Opposition Score	Rank
Austin James Bauer	Men's Singles	Bye	Pavel Kotsarenko (RUS); L 1-2	Did Not Advance					38
Philippe Giguere	Men's Singles	Bye	Kai Hendrik Schaefer (GER); L 0-2	Did Not Advance					45
Jason Anthony Ho Shue	Men's Singles	Bye	Deepak Bohara (NEP); W 2-0	Aman Kumar (IND); W 2-0	Zulfadli Zulkiffli (MAS); L 0-2	Did Not Advance			14
Bauer/Lindeman	Men's Doubles	—N/a	Bye	Ozeki/Kawabata (JPN); L 0-2	Did Not Advance				31
Ho Shue/Lai	Men's Doubles	—N/a	Bye	Pitman/Chiu (USA); W 2-0	Koh/Wee (SGP); W 2-1	Lee/Lee (TPE); L 0-2	Did Not Advance		5
Stephanie Pakenham	Women's Singles	Bye	A. N. Rathnasiri Kapuru Mud. (SRI); L 0-2	Did Not Advance					39
Brittney Shanno Tam	Women's Singles	Bye	Sara Delavarikashani (IRI); W 2-0	Kavidi Ishadika Sirimannage (SRI); W 2-0	Li Lian Yang (MAS); L 0-2	Did Not Advance			13
Takeisha Wang	Women's Singles	Bye	Jooeun Kim (KOR); L 0-2	Did Not Advance					46
Beaulieu/Pakenham	Women's Doubles	—N/a	Bye	Kato/Kashihara (JPN); L 0-2	Did Not Advance				28
Wang/Tam	Women's Doubles	—N/a	Bye	Chaladchalam/Muenwong (THA); L 0-2	Did Not Advance				32
Tong/Wu	Women's Doubles	—N/a	Bye	Chumnibannakarn/ Chatupornkarnchana (THA); L 1-2	Did Not Advance				21
Giguere/Beaulieu	Mixed Doubles	Bye	Hess/Janssens (GER); L 0-2	Did Not Advance					45
Lai/Tong	Mixed Doubles	Bye	Fapohunda/Oyinloye (NGR); W 2-0	Alimov/Davletova (RUS); L 0-2	Did Not Advance				21
Lindeman/Wu	Mixed Doubles	Bye	Primarahmanto Putera/ Mahmudin (INA); L 0-2	Did Not Advance					51

=== Team ===
Athlete	Event	Group stage				9th - 16th place	9th - 13th place	9th place	
Athlete	Event	Opposition Score	Opposition Score	Opposition Score	Rank	Opposition Score	Opposition Score	Opposition Score	Rank
Beaulieu; Bauer; Tam; Ho Shue; Lai; Wu; Tong; Giguere; Pakenham; Wang; Lindeman	Mixed Team	Estonia (EST); W 4–1	Philippines (PHI); W 5–0	Germany (GER); L 2-3	2	Australia (AUS); L 2-3	did not advance		13

== Basketball ==
=== Men's tournament ===
Group Stage

Team	Pld	W	L	PF	PA	PD	Pts
Germany	5	5	0	455	304	+151	10
Finland	5	4	1	421	305	+116	9
Canada	5	3	2	438	344	+94	8
Norway	5	2	3	348	356	−8	7
Japan	5	1	4	327	430	−103	6
Hong Kong	5	0	5	294	544	−250	5

20 August 2017
17:30 (UTC+8)

Report

Norway	54–85	Canada
Scoring by quarter: 18–19, 13–23, 14–17, 9–26

University of Taipei (Tianmu) Gymnasium
Referees: T. Benczur (HUN), A. Csender (ROU), M.L. Sung (TPE)

21 August 2017
10:00 (UTC+8)

Report

Canada	71–79	Finland
Scoring by quarter: 19–19, 8–21, 12–29, 32–10

University of Taipei (Tianmu) Gymnasium
Referees: V. Maciulaitis (LTU), G. Kapitany (HUN), S. Lee (KOR)

22 August 2017
17:30 (UTC+8)

Report

Hong Kong	55–125	Canada
Scoring by quarter: 15–30, 17–27, 18–38, 5–30

Hsinchu Municipal Gymnasium
Referees: A. Dadydov (RUS), F.V. Barrera (CHI), S.A. Chiau (MOZ)

24 August 2017
20:00 (UTC+8)

Report

Canada	84–71	Japan
Scoring by quarter: 20–11, 20–16, 21–19, 23–25

Hsinchu Municipal Gymnasium
Referees: O. Lucis (LAT), M.A. Prado (ARG), B.M. Kyambadde (UGA)

25 August 2017
15:00 (UTC+8)

Report

Canada	73–85	Germany
Scoring by quarter: 28–14, 12–19, 12–19, 21–33

Taipei Arena
Referees: S. Chebyshev (UKR), J.A. Boyer (AUS), C.H. Chen (TPE)

9th–16th place game

27 August 2017
15:00 (UTC+8)

Report

Canada	98–61	Chinese Taipei
Scoring by quarter: 21–9, 23–14, 26–18, 28–20

Hsinchu Municipal Gymnasium
Referees: T. Benczur (HUN), R. Eriksson (SWE), H.S. Carrizales (MEX)

9th–12th place game

28 August 2017
15:00 (UTC+8)

Report

Canada	97–79	Czech Republic
Scoring by quarter: 17–18, 29–20, 27–18, 24–23

Taipei Heping Basketball Gymnasium
Referees: T. Suslov (EST), G. Vitkauskas (LTU), K.N. Apellaniz (USA)

9th place game

29 August 2017
17:30 (UTC+8)

Report

Canada	96–101	Australia
Scoring by quarter: 40–35, 14–18, 25–26, 17–22

University of Taipei (Tianmu) Gymnasium
Referees: V. Maciulaitis (LTU), S. Lee (KOR), V. Györgyi (NOR)

=== Women's tournament ===
Group Stage

Team	Pld	W	L	PF	PA	PD	Pts
Japan	3	3	0	245	149	+96	6
Canada	3	2	1	200	172	+28	5
Portugal	3	1	2	141	175	−34	4
South Korea	3	0	3	139	229	−90	3

21 August 2017
15:30 (UTC+8)

Report

Canada	56–45	Portugal
Scoring by quarter: 8–12, 14–16, 22–8, 12–9

Taipei Heping Basketball Gymnasium
Referees: G. Vitkauskas (LTU), V. Györgyi (NOR), H.M. Chan (HKG)

22 August 2017
17:30

Report

South Korea	42–79	Canada
Scoring by quarter: 7–19, 6–19, 15–17, 14–24

Taipei Heping Basketball Gymnasium
Referees: S. Beliakov (RUS), T. Benczur (HUN), K. Apellaniz (USA)

23 August 2017
15:00 (UTC+8)

Report

Canada	65–85	Japan
Scoring by quarter: 20–18, 10–19, 14–24, 21–24

Taipei Arena
Referees: L.D. Zalazar (ARG), A. Csender (ROU), M. Proc (POL)

Quarterfinals

25 August 2017
17:30 (UTC+8)

Report

Chinese Taipei	76–67	Canada
Scoring by quarter: 18–17, 17–12, 21–17, 20–21

Taipei Arena
Referees: O. Lucis (LAT), A. Csender (ROU), J. Smiljanic (SRB)

== Diving ==
Athlete	Event	Preliminaries		Semifinals		Final	
Athlete	Event	Points	Rank	Points	Rank	Points	Rank
Elaena Nancy Dick	Women's 1m Springboard	236.20	14R	234.40	4	Did Not Advance	
Elaena Nancy Dick	Women's Platform	288.20	6Q	297.00	3Q	310.80	4
Elaena Nancy Dick	Women's 3m Springboard	220.60	25	did not advance			
Tyler Robert Henschel	Men's 3m Springboard	374.70	12Q	356.55	15	did not advance	
Tyler Robert Henschel	Men's Platform	394.00	9Q	408.60	8Q	400.15	9
Peter Thach Mai	Men's 1m Springboard	335.10	17	did not advance			
Peter Thach Mai	Men's 3m Springboard	371.85	13	362.25	14	did not advance	
Ashley Ann McCool	Women's 1m Springboard	180.45	32	did not advance			
Ashley Ann McCool	Women's 3m Springboard	255.70	16Q	267.85	8Q	289.05	5
Celina Jayne Toth	Women's Platform	238.25	14Q	285.55	5Q	329.20	3rd place, bronze medalist(s)
Henschel; Toth	Mixed Team	—N/a				362.80	2nd place, silver medalist(s)

== Fencing ==
Athlete	Event	Round of 128	Round of 64	Round of 32	Round of 16	Quarterfinal	Semifinal	Final / BM	
Athlete	Event	Opposition Score	Opposition Score	Opposition Score	Opposition Score	Opposition Score	Opposition Score	Opposition Score	Rank
Angela Li	Women's Foil Individual	—N/a	Chloe Jubenot (FRA); L 5-15	did not advance					46
Marilyne Plante	Women's Epee Individual	—N/a	Yuliya Svystil (UKR); L 9-15	did not advance					66

== Football ==
=== Men's tournament ===
Group Stage

Pos	Team	Pld	W	D	L	GF	GA	GD	Pts	Qualification
1	Japan	3	3	0	0	9	1	+8	9	Elimination round
2	Uruguay	3	2	0	1	6	2	+4	6	Elimination round
3	Canada	3	1	0	2	2	8	−6	3	Classification round
4	Malaysia	3	0	0	3	1	7	−6	0	Classification round

19 August 2017
11:00

Uruguay	2–0	Canada
Oyenard Dupuy 80' (pen.), 90' (pen.)	Report

New Taipei City Xinzhuang Stadium, New Taipei City
Referee: Kim Woo-sung (South Korea)
21 August 2017
16:00

Japan	5–0	Canada
Nago 41'; Germain 50' (pen.), 65'; Shibato 75'; Wakisaka 90+2'	Report

Fu Jen Catholic University Stadium, New Taipei City
Referee: Ammar Ebrahim Mahfoodh (Bahrain)
23 August 2017
16:00

Canada	2–1	Malaysia
Côté-Kougnima 4'; McMillan 61'	Report	Tumin 32'

New Taipei City Xinzhuang Stadium, New Taipei City
Referee: Yu Ming Hsun (Chinese Taipei)

9th–16th place match

25 August 2017
16:00

Canada	2–0	United States
Kouo Dibongue 4', 44'	Report

Chang Gung University Stadium, Taoyuan City
Referee: Timur Faizullin (Kyrgyzstan)

9th–12th place match

27 August 2017
16:00

South Africa	1–2	Canada
Sixishe 45'	Report	Rajkovic 68', 86' (pen.)

Hsinchu County Second Stadium, Hsinchu County
Referee: Sivakorn Pu-udom (Thailand)

9th place match

29 August 2017
19:30

Canada	3–4	Brazil
MacNaughton 2'; Park 7'; MacMillan 63'	Report	Sabino da Silva 4'; De Pauli Oliveira 30' (pen.); Silva Rocha 34'; Rodrigues dos Reis 86'

Chang Gung University Stadium, Taoyuan City
Referee: Hussein Abo Yehia (Lebanon)

=== Women's tournament ===
Group Stage

Team	Pld	W	D	L	GF	GA	GD	Pts
Mexico	2	1	1	0	2	0	+2	4
Canada	2	1	0	1	1	2	−1	3
Republic of Ireland	2	0	1	1	0	1	−1	1

20 August 2017
16:00

Canada	1–0	Republic of Ireland
Gosselin 64'	Report

Fu Jen Catholic University Stadium, New Taipei City
Referee: Mahsa Ghorbani (Iran)
22 August 2017
16:00

Canada	0–2	Mexico
	Report	Muñoz Soto 15'; Solís 33'

Fu Jen Catholic University Stadium, New Taipei City
Referee: Hung Yi Yu (Chinese Taipei)

Quarterfinals

24 August 2017
19:30

Canada	0–1	Brazil
	Report	Pereira Nunes 68' (pen.)

Hsinchu County Second Stadium, Hsinchu County
Referee: Doumouh Al-Bakkar (Lebanon)

5th–8th place match

26 August 2017
19:30

South Korea	0–0	Canada
Penalties
Kim S. (penalty scored); Lee S.-h. (penalty scored); Ahn (penalty missed); Jang (penalty scored); Lee S.-g. (penalty scored)	4–3	(penalty missed) Roy; (penalty missed) Schellenberg; (penalty scored) Gosselin; (penalty scored) Klasios; (penalty scored) Callender

Chang Gung University Stadium, Taoyuan City
Referee: Cong Thi Dung (Vietnam)

7th place match

28 August 2017
19:30

Mexico	1–0	Canada
Evangelista 19'	Report

New Taipei City Xinzhuang Stadium, New Taipei City
Referee: Anna Sidorova (Uzbekistan)

== Golf ==
Athlete	Event	Round 1	Round 2	Round 3	Total	
Athlete	Event	Score	Score	Score	Score	Rank
Eric Thomas Flockhart	Men's Individual	72	74	72	218	21
Austin Nolan Br Ryan	Men's Individual	74	72	71	217	18
Truman Kenneth Tai	Men's Individual	72	79	70	221	30
Flockhart; Ryan; Tai	Men's Team	144	146	141	431	9
Mu Li	Women's Individual	81	74	78	233	31
Laura Upenieks	Women's Individual	83	78	81	242	44
Li; Park; Upenieks	Women's Team	162	152	153	467	13

== Gymnastics ==
=== Artistic ===
==== Men ====
Individual

Athlete	Event	Apparatus						Total	Rank
Athlete	Event	F	PH	R	V	PB	HB	Total	Rank
René Cournoyer	All-Around	12.900	12.150	14.050	14.350	13.750	13.650	80.850	11

Team

Athlete	Event	Apparatus						Total	Rank
Athlete	Event	F	PH	R	V	PB	HB	Total	Rank
René Cournoyer	Team	13.300	12.450	14.050	13.950	14.125	13.700	81.575	11
Joel Emile Gagnon	Team	13.150	—N/a		14.100	13.350	11.100	51.700	77
Justin August Karstadt	Team	12.750	13.650	13.400	13.850	11.550	—N/a	65.200	56
Aaron James Mah	Team	13.500	10.350	13.000	—N/a		13.200	50.050	82
Samuel Zakutney	Team	—N/a	11.325	13.350	13.600	13.150	13.450	64.875	57
Total	Team	39.950	37.425	40.800	41.900	40.625	40.350	241.050	8

==== Women ====
Individual

Athlete	Event	Apparatus				Total	Rank
Athlete	Event	V	UB	BB	F	Total	Rank
Elsabeth Black	All-Around	14.500	12.900	14.000	13.550	54.950	2nd place, silver medalist(s)
Elsabeth Black	Vault	13.853	—N/a			13.853	4
Elsabeth Black	Uneven Bars	—N/a	13.966	—N/a		13.966	3rd place, bronze medalist(s)
Elsabeth Black	Balance Beam	—N/a		14.133	—N/a	14.133	1st place, gold medalist(s)
Elsabeth Black	Floor Exercise	—N/a			13.433	13.433	4
Brittany Rogers	Vault	14.250	—N/a			14.250	1st place, gold medalist(s)
Brittany Rogers	Balance Beam	—N/a		13.266	—N/a	13.266	5
Briannah Tsang	All-Around	14.000	11.850	12.950	12.200	51.000	11

Team

Athlete	Event	Apparatus				Total	Rank
Athlete	Event	V	UB	BB	F	Total	Rank
Elsabeth Black	Team	14.650	13.550	14.400	13.450	56.050	1
Jessica Dowling	Team	—N/a	12.900	—N/a	12.050	24.950	59
Denelle Pedrick	Team	—N/a		12.750	12.525	25.275	58
Brittany Rogers	Team	14.400	12.900	13.225	—N/a	40.525	45
Briannah Tsang	Team	13.700	10.450	12.850	12.550	49.550	13
Total	Team	42.750	39.350	40.475	38.525	161.100	2nd place, silver medalist(s)

=== Rhythmic ===
Athlete	Event	Apparatus					
Athlete	Event	Hoop	Ball	Clubs	Ribbon	Total	Rank
Cindy Yu Rim Huh	Individual All-Around	13.450	11.100	11.300	10.700	46.550	24
Kaedyn Lashley	Individual All-Around	0.000	11.100	10.100	10.500	31.700	38

== Swimming ==
=== Men ===
Athlete	Event	Heat		Semifinal		Final	
Athlete	Event	Time	Rank	Time	Rank	Time	Rank
Jeremy Soong Ji Bagshaw	400m Freestyle	3:50.89	4	—N/a		3:52.82	6
Jeremy Soong Ji Bagshaw	200m Freestyle	1:50.35	6	1:50.00	7	did not advance	
Jeremy Soong Ji Bagshaw	100m Freestyle	50.98	2	did not advance			
Josiah James Binnema	50m Butterfly	24.67	3	did not advance			
Josiah James Binnema	100m Butterfly	53.34	5	53.77	8	did not advance	
Tristan Cote	400m Individual Medley	4:21.29	4	did not advance			
Tristan Cote	Marathon (10 km)	—N/a				DNS	—N/a
Eric William Hedlin	Marathon (10 km)	—N/a				DNS	—N/a
Robert Graham Hill	100m Backstroke	55.75	4	55.24	7	did not advance	
Robert Graham Hill	200m Individual Medley	2:02.47	6	2:01.96	7	did not advance	
Robert Graham Hill	200m Backstroke	2:00.78	3	2:01.22	7	did not advance	
Oleksandr Loginov	50m Freestyle	22.39	3	22.59	8	did not advance	
Luke Patrick Reilly	200m Individual Medley	2:03.33	6	3:03.44	8	did not advance	
Luke Patrick Reilly	400m Individual Medley	2:4:24.51	5	did not advance			
Markus Thormeyer	100m Backstroke	55.04	3	54.80	4	54.90	8
Markus Thormeyer	200m Freestyle	1:51.21	5	did not advance			
Markus Thormeyer	100m Freestyle	50.95	8	did not advance			
Markus Thormeyer	200m Backstroke	2:00.98	4	2:00.88	6	did not advance	
Markus Thormeyer	50m Freestyle	23.22	4	did not advance			
Elijah Benjamin Wall	100m Breaststroke	1:01.27	1	1:01.48	5	did not advance	
Elijah Benjamin Wall	200m Breaststroke	2:13.71	5	2:13.29	6	did not advance	
Elijah Benjamin Wall	50m Breaststroke	28.42	2	did not advance			
Markus Thormeyer; Jeremy Soong Ji Bagshaw; Tristan Cote; Luke Patrick Reilly; Robert Graham Hill	4x200m Freestyle Relay	7:23.29	4	—N/a		7:22.89	7
Robert Graham Hill; Elijah Benjamin Wall; Josiah James Binnema; Markus Thormeyer; Jeremy Soong Ji Bagshaw	4x100m Medley Relay	3:40.34	5	—N/a		did not advance	

=== Women ===
Athlete	Event	Heat		Semifinal		Final	
Athlete	Event	Time	Rank	Time	Rank	Time	Rank
Bailey Saywell Andison	400m Individual Medley	4:52.65	8	did not advance			
Bailey Saywell Andison	200m Individual Medley	2:15.60	2	2:15.28	5	did not advance	
Bailey Saywell Andison	50m Breaststroke	32.51	5	32.48	7	did not advance	
Sarah Elizabeth Darcel	400m Individual Medley	4:41.90	3	—N/a		4:42.07	4
Sarah Elizabeth Darcel	200m Individual Medley	2:13.20	1	2:12.66	3	2:13.18	5
Sarah Elizabeth Darcel	200m Breaststroke	2:31.94	3	2:31.89	8	did not advance	
Sarah Elizabeth Darcel	200m Butterfly	2:2:13.60	3	2:13.49	6	did not advance	
Jade Dusablon	Marathon (10 km)	—N/a				DNS	—N/a
Sarah Fournier	50m Freestyle	DNS	—N/a	did not advance			
Mackenzie Eliza Glover	200m Backstroke	2:11.94	2	2:10.62	3	2:10.69	6
Mackenzie Eliza Glover	50m Backstroke	29.76	7	did not advance			
Kennedy Alison Goss	200m Freestyle	2:00.41	2	1:59.94	6	did not advance	
Kennedy Alison Goss	400m Freestyle	4:13.08	5	—N/a		4:13.88	8
Danielle Franci Hanus	100m Backstroke	1:02.00	4	1:02.64	8	did not advance	
Danielle Franci Hanus	50m Backstroke	29.16	4	29.01	8	did not advance	
Jacqueline Keire	100m Freestyle	55.76	5	55.77	8	did not advance	
Jacqueline Keire	50m Freestyle	26.13	5	did not advance			
Danica Christin Ludlow	800m Freestyle	8:55.06	2	did not advance			
Danica Christin Ludlow	400m Freestyle	4:13.32	4	did not advance			
Katerine Savard	50m Butterfly	26.39	1	26.36	1	26.70	7
Katerine Savard	100m Freestyle	55.48	2	55.27	2	54.98	4
Katerine Savard	100m Butterfly	1:00.24	3	1:00.45	7	did not advance	
Katerine Savard	200m Freestyle	2:00.24	4	1:59.44	4	1:59.21	6
Lauren Meg Techtsoonian	Marathon (10 km)	—N/a				DNS	—N/a
Kelsey Lauren Wog	100m Breaststroke	1:09.48	3	1:09.33	7	did not advance	
Kelsey Lauren Wog	200m Breaststroke	2:30.45	2	2:31.67	7	did not advance	
Kelsey Lauren Wog	50m Breaststroke	32.23	3	32.28	6	did not advance	
Alexia Zevnik	200m Backstroke	2:11.20	3	2:10.93	4	2:09.92	2nd place, silver medalist(s)
Alexia Zevnik	100m Backstroke	1:00.49	1	1:00.62	2	1:00.78	4
Sarah Fournier; Jacqueline Keire; Katerine Savard; Alexia Zevnik; Kelsey Lauren Wog; Kennedy Alison Goss; Sarah Elizabeth Darcel	4x100m Freestyle Relay	3:43.99	3	—N/a		3:39.21	1st place, gold medalist(s)
Jacqueline Keire; Katerine Savard; Kennedy Alison Goss; Danica Christin Ludlow; Sarah Elizabeth Darcel; Alexia Zevnik; Mackenzie Eliza Glover	4x200m Freestyle Relay	8:04.37	2	—N/a		8:01.00	5
Alexia Zevnik; Kelsey Lauren Wog; Katerine Savard; Jacqueline Keire; Danielle Franci Hanus; Kennedy Alison Goss; Sarah Elizabeth Darcel; Sarah Fournier	4x100m Medley Relay	4:07.08	2	—N/a		4:03.99	5

== Table Tennis ==
Athlete	Event	Group Stage			Round of 128	Round of 64	Round of 32	Round of 16	Quarterfinals	Semifinals	Final / BM	
Athlete	Event	Opposition Result	Opposition Result	Opposition Result	Opposition Result	Opposition Result	Opposition Result	Opposition Result	Opposition Result	Opposition Result	Opposition Result	Rank
Bryan Ho	Men's Singles	Sebastian Patri Roman Aravena (CHI); L 1-3	Mario Cristobal Alvarez Sanchez (NCA); W 3-0	—N/a		Did Not Advance						
Lester Ka Chun Lee	Men's Singles	Cheuk Hin Ng (HKG); W 3-2	Dean Shu (NZL); W 3-2	—N/a		Alexandru Mihai Manole (ROU); L 1-4	Did Not Advance					
Yen Chun Lu	Men's Singles	Jevgenijs Gmiraks (LAT); W 3-0	Taras Merzlikin (RUS); L 0-3	—N/a		Did Not Advance						
James Pintea	Men's Singles	Belguudei Amgalanbaatar (MGL); W 3-0	Yijun Feng (USA); W 3-1	—N/a		Giorgos Konstantinopoulos (GRE); L 3-4	Did Not Advance					
Klement Chun-Mi Yeung	Men's Singles	Boago Kabo Malobela (BOT); W 3-0	Barsbold Tumurbaatar (MGL); W 3-0	—N/a		Hung-Chieh Chiang (TPE); L 1-4	Did Not Advance					
Ho/Yeung	Men's Doubles	—N/a			Bye	Koh/Teo (SGP); L 0-3	Did Not Advance					
Lu/Pintea	Men's Doubles	—N/a			Bye	Amgalanbaatar/ Purevnyam (SGP); W 3-0	Lee/Liao (SGP); L 2-3	Did Not Advance				
Ho; Lee; Lu; Pintea; Yeung	Men's Team	Poland (POL); L 0-3	Australia (AUS); L 1-3	Republic of Korea (KOR); L 0-3	—N/a			Did Not Advance				
Betty Guo	Women's Singles	Kavindi Rukmali Sahabandu (SRI); L 2-3	Karoline Mischek (AUT); L 1-3	—N/a		Did Not Advance						
Hollie Lau	Women's Singles	Cheng I Kuok (MAC); L 0-3	Agustina Iwasa (ARG); L 0-3	—N/a		Did Not Advance						
Michelle Xin-Ro Liaw	Women's Singles	Anna Pfeffer (AUT); W 3-0	Ida Jazbec (CRO); L 0-3	—N/a		Did Not Advance						
Anqi Luo	Women's Singles	Kasuni Himaya Pitigala (SRI); W 3-0	Hanna Patseyeva (BLR); W 3-0	—N/a		Lily Ann Zhang (USA); L 0-4	Did Not Advance					
Yi Zhen Yan	Women's Singles	Yuko Imamura (GER); L 0-3	Ekaterina Guseva (RUS); L 0-3	—N/a		Did Not Advance						
Lau/Yan	Women's Doubles	—N/a			Bye	Narumoto/ Yamamoto (JPN); L 0-3	Did Not Advance					
Liaw/Luo	Women's Doubles	—N/a			Bye	Banda/Chikusi (ZAM); W 3-0	Chen/Cheng (TPE); L 1-3	Did Not Advance				
Guo; Lau; Liaw; Luo; Yan	Women's Team	Poland (POL); L 0-3	Australia (AUS); W 3-0	Singapore (SGP); L 0-3	—N/a			Did Not Advance				
Lee/Luo	Mixed Doubles	—N/a			Bye	Zholudev/Lavrova (KAZ); W 3-2	Robinot/Gasnier (JPN); L 0-3	Did Not Advance				
Lu/Guo	Mixed Doubles	—N/a			Bye	Comaingking/ Comaingking (KAZ); W 3-0	Choe/Choe (PRK); L 0-3	Did Not Advance				

== Taekwondo ==
Athlete	Event	Round of 64	Round of 32	Round of 16	Quarterfinals	Semifinals	Final / BM	
Athlete	Event	Opposition Result	Opposition Result	Opposition Result	Opposition Result	Opposition Result	Opposition Result	Rank
Hayk Amirbekyan	Men's +87 kg	—N/a	Bye	Rafail Aiukaev (RUS); L 1-22	Did Not Advance			
Ashlyn Shawla Arnold	Women's -67 kg	—N/a	Cristina Gaspa (ITA); L 3-24	Did Not Advance				
Abbas Assadian Jr	Men's Freestyle Poomsae	—N/a				7.700	Did Not Advance	
Emmanuelle Anna Boudreau	Women's +73 kg	—N/a	Melani Adamic-Golic (CRO); L 4-10	Did Not Advance				
Shane Alexander Britton	Men's -58 kg	Lubendsky Lucie Premont (HAI); W 0-WDR	Mourad Abdel Ma Laachraoui (BEL); W 14-8	Did Not Advance				
Ethienne Brunet	Men's -87 kg	—N/a	Ensar Uguz (TUR); L 11-12	Did Not Advance				
Hunter James Ch Carroll	Men's -68 kg	Bye	Umesh Raj Bhandari (NEP); W 26-0	Ahmad Abughaush (JOR); L 26-30	Did Not Advance			
Jackson John Jo Carroll	Men's -63 kg	Maksat Allalyev (RUS); L 6-14	Did Not Advance					
Crystal Lok Yee Chan	Women's -46 kg	—N/a	Bye	Asifa Ali (PAK); W 23-2	Kyriaki Kouttouki (CYP); L 5-26	Did Not Advance		
Rachel Elizabeth Cuma	Women's -73 kg	—N/a	Bye	Alina Ikaeva (RUS); L 13-30	Did Not Advance			
Andrea Jerom	Women's -53 kg	—N/a	Krystel El Koussa (LBN); W 27-WDR	Fracisca Catal Rios Rojas (CHI); W 7-2	Geumbyeol Lim (KOR); L 5-7	Did Not Advance		
Eloi Paradis Deschenes	Men's -74 kg	Bye	Abdul Faatih Ji Shobambi (NGR); W0-DSQ	Ramin Hosseingholi Zadeh (IRI); L 10-31	Did Not Advance			
Ruxandra Ella Rodgers	Women's -57 kg	—N/a	Marie Magnus (NOR); L 7-8	Did Not Advance				
Gabrielle Rousseau	Women's -62 kg	—N/a	Yulia Turtina (RUS); L 5-16	Did Not Advance				
Anas Sghir	Men's -54 kg	—N/a	Nicol Stephane Audibert (FRA); LDSQ-0	Did Not Advance				
Adam Valentine Tomlinson	Men's -80 kg	Ulysses Haller (THA); W18-10	Moises Daniel Hernandez (FRA); L6-12	Did Not Advance				
Viviane Tranquille	Women's -49 kg	—N/a	Bye	Miyu Yamada (JPN); L 8-13	Did Not Advance			
Shane Alexander Britton; Eloi Paradis Deschenes; Ethienne Brunet; Anas Sghir	Men's Team Kyorugi	—N/a	Bye	Republic of Korea (KOR); L 28-32	Did Not Advance			
Kaitlyn Nicole Wiens; Angela Sinilaite; Maria Inez Philip	Women's Team Poomsae	—N/a				7.367	Did Not Advance	
Andrea Jerom; Ruxandra Ella Rodgers; Ashlyn Shayla Arnold; Rachel Elizabeth Cuma	Women's Team Kyorugi	—N/a	Russia (RUS); L 11-24	Did Not Advance				

== Volleyball ==
=== Men's tournament ===
Preliminary Round

Pos	Team	Pld	W	L	Pts	SW	SL	SR	SPW	SPL	SPR	Qualification
1	Iran	5	5	0	15	15	2	7.500	419	317	1.322	Quarterfinals
2	Argentina	5	4	1	12	13	3	4.333	381	305	1.249	Quarterfinals
3	Switzerland	5	3	2	8	10	9	1.111	447	407	1.098	9th–16th place
4	Canada	5	2	3	6	8	11	0.727	390	426	0.915	9th–16th place
5	Cyprus	5	1	4	3	3	13	0.231	297	394	0.754	17th–22nd place
6	United Arab Emirates	5	0	5	1	4	15	0.267	367	452	0.812	17th–22nd place

Date	Time		Score		Set 1	Set 2	Set 3	Set 4	Set 5	Total	Report
20 Aug	18:00	Canada	3–2	United Arab Emirates	23–25	25–21	25–21	23–25	16–14	112–106	P2 P3
21 Aug	20:00	Switzerland	3–2	Canada	23–25	30–32	25–17	25–23	15–13	118–110	P2 P3
22 Aug	20:00	Canada	3–0	Cyprus	25–15	25–22	25–15			75–52	P2 P3
24 Aug	13:00	Argentina	3–0	Canada	25–11	25–17	25–15			75–43	P2 P2
25 Aug	13:00	Canada	0–3	Iran	19–25	15–25	16–25			50–75	P2 P3

9th–16th place quarterfinals

Date	Time		Score		Set 1	Set 2	Set 3	Set 4	Set 5	Total	Report
27 Aug	15:00	Canada	3–2	Romania	20–25	25–16	18–25	26–24	15–13	104–103	P2 P3

9th–12th place semifinals

Date	Time		Score		Set 1	Set 2	Set 3	Set 4	Set 5	Total	Report
28 Aug	17:30	France	3–1	Canada	21–25	25–23	25–16	25–22		96–86	P2 P3

11th place match

Date	Time		Score		Set 1	Set 2	Set 3	Set 4	Set 5	Total	Report
29 Aug	13:00	Canada	3–1	Chinese Taipei	25–21	16–25	25–17	25–17		91–80	P2 P3

=== Women's tournament ===
Preliminary Round

Pos	Team	Pld	W	L	Pts	SW	SL	SR	SPW	SPL	SPR	Qualification
1	Ukraine	3	3	0	9	9	2	4.500	267	216	1.236	Quarterfinals
2	Argentina	3	2	1	5	6	6	1.000	246	243	1.012	Quarterfinals
3	Switzerland	3	1	2	4	6	7	0.857	274	270	1.015	
4	Canada	3	0	3	0	3	9	0.333	236	294	0.803	

Date	Time		Score		Set 1	Set 2	Set 3	Set 4	Set 5	Total	Report
21 Aug	13:00	Switzerland	3–1	Canada	22–25	25–15	25–20	25–12		97–72	P2 P3
22 Aug	13:00	Ukraine	3–1	Canada	25–19	25–18	22–25	25–20		97–82	P2 P3
23 Aug	13:00	Canada	1–3	Argentina	22–25	27–25	16–25	17–25		82–100	P2 P3

9th–16th place quarterfinals

Date	Time		Score		Set 1	Set 2	Set 3	Set 4	Set 5	Total	Report
25 Aug	18:00	Czech Republic	3–1	Canada	25–20	14–25	25–12	25–17		89–74	P2 P3

13th–16th place semifinals

Date	Time		Score		Set 1	Set 2	Set 3	Set 4	Set 5	Total	Report
26 Aug	18:00	Canada	3–0	Mexico	25–15	25–22	25–17			75–54	P2 P3

13th place match

Date	Time		Score		Set 1	Set 2	Set 3	Set 4	Set 5	Total	Report
27 Aug	15:00	Canada	3–0	Latvia	25–14	25–15	25–10			75–39	P2 P3

== Water Polo ==
=== Men's tournament ===
Preliminary Round

Team	Pld	W	D	L	GF	GA	GD	Pts
Serbia	3	3	0	0	49	7	+42	6
Hungary	3	2	0	1	45	16	+29	4
Canada	3	1	0	2	13	49	–36	2
South Africa	3	0	0	3	10	45	–35	0

18 August 2017; 14:20	Report	Hungary	17–3	Canada	Hsinchu County Natatorium; Referees: Pascal Bouchez (FRA); Marco Ercoli (ITA)
18 August 2017; 14:20	Report	Score by quarters: 4–1, 5–0, 4–0, 4–2			Hsinchu County Natatorium; Referees: Pascal Bouchez (FRA); Marco Ercoli (ITA)
18 August 2017; 14:20	Report	Jansik 4	Goals	three players 1	Hsinchu County Natatorium; Referees: Pascal Bouchez (FRA); Marco Ercoli (ITA)

20 August 2017; 14:20	Report	South Africa	4–8	Canada	Hsinchu County Natatorium; Referees: David Couper (NZL); Chang Wan Yu (TPE)
20 August 2017; 14:20	Report	Score by quarters: 0–3, 2–2, 1–2, 1–1			Hsinchu County Natatorium; Referees: David Couper (NZL); Chang Wan Yu (TPE)
20 August 2017; 14:20	Report	four players 1	Goals	Thumwood 4	Hsinchu County Natatorium; Referees: David Couper (NZL); Chang Wan Yu (TPE)

21 August 2017; 15:40	Report	Serbia	28–2	Canada	Hsinchu County Natatorium; Referees: Jaume Teixido (ESP); Marco Ercoli (ITA)
21 August 2017; 15:40	Report	Score by quarters: 6–0, 8–0, 7–0, 7–2			Hsinchu County Natatorium; Referees: Jaume Teixido (ESP); Marco Ercoli (ITA)
21 August 2017; 15:40	Report	Drašović 5	Goals	Chapman, Graham 1	Hsinchu County Natatorium; Referees: Jaume Teixido (ESP); Marco Ercoli (ITA)

Round of 16

23 August 2017; 10:20	Report	Great Britain	7–6	Canada	Hsinchu County Natatorium; Referees: Sebastien Dervieux (FRA); Hiroaki Ogino (JPN)
23 August 2017; 10:20	Report	Score by quarters: 2–3, 1–1, 3–2, 1–0			Hsinchu County Natatorium; Referees: Sebastien Dervieux (FRA); Hiroaki Ogino (JPN)
23 August 2017; 10:20	Report	Harrington 3	Goals	Spooner, Thumwood 2	Hsinchu County Natatorium; Referees: Sebastien Dervieux (FRA); Hiroaki Ogino (JPN)

9th–16th place quarterfinals

25 August 2017; 09:00	Report	South Africa	6–7	Canada	Hsinchu County Natatorium; Referees: Adam Richardson (AUS); Sebastien Dervieux (FRA)
25 August 2017; 09:00	Report	Score by quarters: 2–3, 2–2, 0–1, 2–1			Hsinchu County Natatorium; Referees: Adam Richardson (AUS); Sebastien Dervieux (FRA)
25 August 2017; 09:00	Report	Evezard 3	Goals	Spooner 3	Hsinchu County Natatorium; Referees: Adam Richardson (AUS); Sebastien Dervieux (FRA)

9th–12th place semifinals

27 August 2017; 12:00	Report	Canada	9–4	South Korea	Hsinchu County Natatorium; Referees: Andreas Moiralis (GRE); Chang Wan-yu (TPE)
27 August 2017; 12:00	Report	Score by quarters: 0–0, 2–0, 5–2, 2–2			Hsinchu County Natatorium; Referees: Andreas Moiralis (GRE); Chang Wan-yu (TPE)
27 August 2017; 12:00	Report	D'Souza, Spooner 3	Goals	four players 1	Hsinchu County Natatorium; Referees: Andreas Moiralis (GRE); Chang Wan-yu (TPE)

9th place match

29 August 2017; 13:30	Report	Canada	8–18	United States	National Taiwan Sport University Arena; Referees: Keiichi Orikasa (JPN); Radu-Sorin Matache (ROU)
29 August 2017; 13:30	Report	Score by quarters: 2–4, 1–5, 0–3, 5–6			National Taiwan Sport University Arena; Referees: Keiichi Orikasa (JPN); Radu-Sorin Matache (ROU)
29 August 2017; 13:30	Report	Thumwood 4	Goals	Stevenson 5	National Taiwan Sport University Arena; Referees: Keiichi Orikasa (JPN); Radu-Sorin Matache (ROU)

=== Women's tournament ===
Preliminary Round

Team	Pld	W	D	L	GF	GA	GD	Pts
Russia	5	5	0	0	95	44	+51	10
Hungary	5	3	0	2	76	35	+41	6
Japan	5	3	0	2	64	60	+4	6
Canada	5	3	0	2	69	43	+26	6
Great Britain	5	0	1	4	26	104	–78	1
New Zealand	5	0	1	4	32	76	–44	1

18 August 2017; 09:00	Report	Canada	15–4	New Zealand	Taipei Songshan Sports Center Swimming Pool; Referees: Sebastien Dervieux (FRA); Erwin Schapers (NED)
18 August 2017; 09:00	Report	Score by quarters: 6–0, 2–0, 4–1, 3–3			Taipei Songshan Sports Center Swimming Pool; Referees: Sebastien Dervieux (FRA); Erwin Schapers (NED)
18 August 2017; 09:00	Report	Lemay Lavoie 4	Goals	four players 1	Taipei Songshan Sports Center Swimming Pool; Referees: Sebastien Dervieux (FRA); Erwin Schapers (NED)

20 August 2017; 13:00	Report	Canada	11–17	Russia	Taipei Songshan Sports Center Swimming Pool; Referees: Andrew Carney (AUS); Leonadro Ceccarelli (ITA)
20 August 2017; 13:00	Report	Score by quarters: 2–4, 3–4, 1–4, 5–5			Taipei Songshan Sports Center Swimming Pool; Referees: Andrew Carney (AUS); Leonadro Ceccarelli (ITA)
20 August 2017; 13:00	Report	Lemay-Lavoie, Fournier 3	Goals	three players 3	Taipei Songshan Sports Center Swimming Pool; Referees: Andrew Carney (AUS); Leonadro Ceccarelli (ITA)

22 August 2017; 13:00	Report	Hungary	5–8	Canada	Taipei Songshan Sports Center Swimming Pool; Referees: Andreas Moiralis (GRE); Radu-Sorin Matache (ROU)
22 August 2017; 13:00	Report	Score by quarters: 1–3, 2–1, 1–2, 1–2			Taipei Songshan Sports Center Swimming Pool; Referees: Andreas Moiralis (GRE); Radu-Sorin Matache (ROU)
22 August 2017; 13:00	Report	five players 1	Goals	Crevier 3	Taipei Songshan Sports Center Swimming Pool; Referees: Andreas Moiralis (GRE); Radu-Sorin Matache (ROU)

24 August 2017; 11:40	Report	Canada	11–12	Japan	Taipei Songshan Sports Center Swimming Pool; Referees: Stephen O'Brien (IRL); Erwin Schapers (NED)
24 August 2017; 11:40	Report	Score by quarters: 2–4, 3–2, 4–2, 2–4			Taipei Songshan Sports Center Swimming Pool; Referees: Stephen O'Brien (IRL); Erwin Schapers (NED)
24 August 2017; 11:40	Report	Lemay-Lavoie 5	Goals	Arima 5	Taipei Songshan Sports Center Swimming Pool; Referees: Stephen O'Brien (IRL); Erwin Schapers (NED)

25 August 2017; 13:00	Report	Canada	24–5	Great Britain	Taipei Songshan Sports Center Swimming Pool; Referees: Andrew Carney (AUS); Ursula Wengenroth (SUI)
25 August 2017; 13:00	Report	Score by quarters: 5–1, 4–3, 6–1, 9–0			Taipei Songshan Sports Center Swimming Pool; Referees: Andrew Carney (AUS); Ursula Wengenroth (SUI)
25 August 2017; 13:00	Report	Lemay-Lavoie 5	Goals	Hesketh 3	Taipei Songshan Sports Center Swimming Pool; Referees: Andrew Carney (AUS); Ursula Wengenroth (SUI)

Quarterfinals

26 August 2017; 18:00	Report	Canada	7–13	United States	Taipei Songshan Sports Center Swimming Pool; Referees: Jaume Teixido (ESP); Balazs Szekely (HUN)
26 August 2017; 18:00	Report	Score by quarters: 1–4, 1–3, 3–3, 2–3			Taipei Songshan Sports Center Swimming Pool; Referees: Jaume Teixido (ESP); Balazs Szekely (HUN)
26 August 2017; 18:00	Report	Lemay-Lavoie 3	Goals	six players 2	Taipei Songshan Sports Center Swimming Pool; Referees: Jaume Teixido (ESP); Balazs Szekely (HUN)

5th–8th place semifinals

28 August 2017; 15:00	Report	Italy	13–16	Canada	National Taiwan Sport University Arena; Referees: Attila Marosvari (HUN); Amber Drury (USA)
28 August 2017; 15:00	Report	Score by quarters: 4–5, 2–5, 3–3, 4–3			National Taiwan Sport University Arena; Referees: Attila Marosvari (HUN); Amber Drury (USA)
28 August 2017; 15:00	Report	D'Amico, Millo 3	Goals	Lemay-Lavoie 5	National Taiwan Sport University Arena; Referees: Attila Marosvari (HUN); Amber Drury (USA)

5th place match

29 August 2017; 16:30	Report	Australia	8–16	Canada	National Taiwan Sport University Arena; Referees: Amber Drury (USA); Vladimir Gerzanich (RUS)
29 August 2017; 16:30	Report	Score by quarters: 1–5, 3–4, 1–4, 3–3			National Taiwan Sport University Arena; Referees: Amber Drury (USA); Vladimir Gerzanich (RUS)
29 August 2017; 16:30	Report	Morrissey 3	Goals	Lemay-Lavoie 3	National Taiwan Sport University Arena; Referees: Amber Drury (USA); Vladimir Gerzanich (RUS)

== Weightlifting ==
Athlete	Event	Snatch		Clean & Jerk		Total	Rank
Athlete	Event	Result	Rank	Result	Rank	Total	Rank
Alex Bellemarre	Men's 77 kg	147	2	169	5	316	3rd place, bronze medalist(s)
Jerome Boisclair	Men's 77 kg	DNF					
Ann-Maxime Bouffard	Women's 53 kg	70	9	89	10	155	9
Alexandre Caza	Men's 105 kg	137	4	164	4	301	14
Maude Charron	Women's 63 kg	94	7	120	5	214	6
Gabriel Dagenais	Men's 94 kg	141	5	185	2	326	15
Tali Darsigny	Women's 63 kg	86	1	109	1	195	9
Edouard Freve-Guerin	Men's 69 kg	121	5	148	5	269	14
Caroline Lamarche McClure	Women's 58 kg	78	1	101	2	179	10
Mathieu Marineau	Men's 85 kg	140	2	176	1	316	10
Andreanne Messier	Women's 69 kg	87	3	108	4	195	14
Kristel Ngarlem	Women's 75 kg	95	5	125	4	220	4
Magalie Roux	Women's 69 kg	DNF					
David Vincent Samayoa	Men's 105 kg	152	1	170	3	322	12
Boady Robert Santavy	Men's 94 kg	161	9	196	7	357	8

== Wushu ==
Athlete	Event	Pool Round	
Athlete	Event	Score	Rank
Jeneva Rae Paul Beairsto	Women's Taolu – Changquan	8.52	10
Jason Chen Leung	Men's Taolu – Changquan	8.70	12
Megan Michel Tsang	Women's Taolu – Tajiquan & Taijijian	8.92	7
Philip Ka Fai Wong	Men's Taolu – Nanquan & Nangun	9.15	9
