= Malaysia at the 2017 Summer Universiade =

- IOC code: MAS
- National federation: Malaysian University Sports Council
- Website: www.masum.org.my

in Taipei, Taiwan 19 – 30 August 2017
- Competitors: 63 in 7 sports
- Medals Ranked 46th: Gold 0 Silver 3 Bronze 4 Total 7

Summer Universiade appearances (overview)
- 1985; 1987; 1989; 1991; 1993; 1995; 1997; 1999; 2001; 2003; 2005; 2007; 2009; 2011; 2013; 2015; 2017; 2019; 2021; 2025; 2027

Malaysia participated at the 2017 Summer Universiade, in Taipei, Taiwan.

== Medal summary ==
=== Medal by sports ===
Medals by sport
Sport	1st place, gold medalist(s)	2nd place, silver medalist(s)	3rd place, bronze medalist(s)	Total
Badminton	0	1	3	4
Wushu	0	2	1	3
Total	0	3	4	7
