= Swimming at the 2017 Summer Universiade – Men's 200 metre individual medley =

Men's 200 metre individual medley at the 2017 Summer Universiade
- Venue: National Taiwan Sport University Arena
- Location: Taipei, Taiwan
- Dates: 21 August (heats and semifinals); 22 August (final)
- Competitors: 49 from 37 nations
- Winning time: 1:57.35

Medalists
gold medal	Kosuke Hagino	Japan
silver medal	Daiya Seto	Japan
bronze medal	Joe Litchfield	Great Britain

The Men's 200 metre individual medley competition at the 2017 Summer Universiade was held on 21 and 22 August 2017.

== Records ==
Prior to the competition, the existing world and Universiade records were as follows.

World record	Ryan Lochte (USA)	1:54.00	Shanghai, China	28 July 2011
Competition record	Alex Vanderkaay (USA)	1:57.58	Belgrade, Serbia	7 July 2009

The following new records were set during this competition.

Date	Event	Name	Nationality	Time	Record
22 August	Final	Kosuke Hagino	Japan	1:57.35	UR

== Results ==
=== Heats ===
The heats were held on 21 August at 09:36.

Rank	Heat	Lane	Name	Nationality	Time	Notes
1	6	4	Daiya Seto	Japan	1:59.88	Q
2	5	6	Aleksandr Osipenko	Russia	2:01.35	Q
3	7	4	Kosuke Hagino	Japan	2:01.39	Q
4	6	6	Joe Litchfield	Great Britain	2:01.46	Q
5	5	2	Michał Poprawa	Poland	2:01.59	Q
6	5	3	Gabriel Lópes	Portugal	2:01.64	Q
6	5	4	Will Licon	United States	2:01.64	Q
8	7	2	Vinicius Lanza	Brazil	2:01.65	Q
9	4	3	Arjan Knipping	Netherlands	2:01.76	Q
10	7	7	Andrey Zhilkin	Russia	2:01.85	Q
11	7	3	Giovanni Sorriso	Italy	2:02.09	Q
12	7	5	Kenneth To	Hong Kong	2:02.41	Q
13	7	1	Robert Hill	Canada	2:02.47	Q
14	6	2	Grant Sanders	United States	2:03.03	Q
15	7	8	Luke Reilly	Canada	2:03.33	Q
16	7	6	Kevin Wedel	Germany	2:03.48	Q
17	5	5	Claudio Fossi	Italy	2:03.60	
18	6	5	Georgios Spanoudakis	Greece	2:03.67	
19	4	4	Teemu Vuorela	Finland	2:03.72	
20	6	7	Dag Fredriksson	Sweden	2:03.87	
21	5	1	Dawid Szwedzki	Poland	2:04.09	
22	4	6	Wang Hsing-hao	Chinese Taipei	2:04.32	
23	4	1	Povilas Strazdas	Lithuania	2:04.54	
24	6	1	Wen Ren-hau	Chinese Taipei	2:04.89	
25	5	7	Kim Jae-woo	South Korea	2:05.08	
26	4	5	Tomáš Havránek	Czech Republic	2:05.33	
27	6	8	Neil Fair	South Africa	2:05.34	
28	5	8	Héctor Ruvalcaba	Mexico	2:05.53	
29	4	7	William Lulek	Sweden	2:06.03	
30	4	2	Mateo González Medina	Mexico	2:06.25	
31	3	3	Daniils Bobrovs	Latvia	2:07.28	
32	6	3	Dániel Sós	Hungary	2:07.40	
33	3	5	Nicolás Deferrari	Argentina	2:07.96	
34	3	4	Pavol Jelenák	Slovakia	2:08.32	
35	3	7	Ng Yan Kin	Hong Kong	2:09.51	
36	4	8	Thomas Dal	Belgium	2:09.80	
37	3	6	Muhammad Hamgari	Indonesia	2:09.92	
38	3	1	Felipe Quiroz Uteau	Chile	2:10.18	
39	2	7	Lin Sizhuang	Macau	2:10.70	NR
40	3	8	Muhammad Alamzah	Indonesia	2:12.51	
41	3	2	Li Xiaochen	China	2:15.45	
42	2	4	Mu Xingxu	China	2:16.09	
43	2	2	Maroun Waked	Lebanon	2:16.42	
44	2	1	Andy Frank Rodríguez	Uruguay	2:16.45	
45	2	3	Lim Fang Yi	Singapore	2:19.76	
46	1	5	Enrique Nava Miranda	Bolivia	2:22.75	
47	2	5	Luis Zacarias Rojas	Paraguay	2:25.39	
48	1	3	Daniil Latt	Estonia	2:26.18	
49	1	4	Leonard Licudo	Philippines	2:31.11	
	2	6	Andrei Gussev	Estonia	DNS	

=== Semifinals ===
The semifinals were held on 21 August at 19:55.

==== Semifinal 1 ====
Rank	Lane	Name	Nationality	Time	Notes
1	2	Andrey Zhilkin	Russia	2:00.17	Q
2	5	Joe Litchfield	Great Britain	2:00.44	Q
3	4	Aleksandr Osipenko	Russia	2:00.55	Q
4	7	Kenneth To	Hong Kong	2:01.37	Q, NR
5	3	Will Licon	United States	2:01.44	
6	6	Vinicius Lanza	Brazil	2:01.58	
7	1	Grant Sanders	United States	2:02.28	
8	8	Kevin Wedel	Germany	2:03.10	

==== Semifinal 2 ====
Rank	Lane	Name	Nationality	Time	Notes
1	4	Daiya Seto	Japan	1:58.63	Q
2	5	Kosuke Hagino	Japan	2:00.81	Q
3	3	Michał Poprawa	Poland	2:01.09	Q
4	7	Giovanni Sorriso	Italy	2:01.13	Q
5	2	Arjan Knipping	Netherlands	2:01.89	
6	6	Gabriel Lópes	Portugal	2:01.95	
7	1	Robert Hill	Canada	2:01.96	
8	8	Luke Reilly	Canada	2:03.44	

=== Final ===
The final was held on 22 August at 20:25.

Rank	Lane	Name	Nationality	Time	Notes
1st place, gold medalist(s)	2	Kosuke Hagino	Japan	1:57.35	UR
2nd place, silver medalist(s)	4	Daiya Seto	Japan	1:58.73	
3rd place, bronze medalist(s)	3	Joe Litchfield	Great Britain	1:59.36	
4	5	Andrey Zhilkin	Russia	2:00.26	
5	6	Aleksandr Osipenko	Russia	2:01.11	
6	7	Michał Poprawa	Poland	2:01.17	
7	1	Giovanni Sorriso	Italy	2:01.35	
8	8	Kenneth To	Hong Kong	2:01.64	
