= Athletics at the 2017 Summer Universiade =

- Dates: 23–28 August 2017
- Host city: (Chinese Taipei) Taipei, Taiwan
- Venue: Taipei Municipal Stadium
- Level: Senior
- Events: 46
- Participation: 1258 athletes from 115 nations
- Records set: 2 URs

Athletics was contested at the 2017 Summer Universiade from August 23 to 28 at the Taipei Municipal Stadium in Taipei, Taiwan.

== Medal summary ==
=== Men's events ===
Event	Gold		Silver		Bronze	
100 metres	Yang Chun-han; Chinese Taipei	10.22	Thando Roto; South Africa	10.24	Cameron Burrell; United States	10.27
200 metres	Jeffrey John; France	20.93	James Linde; Canada	20.96	Ján Volko; Slovakia	20.99
400 metres	Luguelín Santos; Dominican Republic	45.24 SB	Yoandys Lescay; Cuba	45.31 SB	Rafał Omelko; Poland	45.56
800 metres	Jesús Tonatiu López; Mexico	1:46.06 PB	Mohamed Belbachir; Algeria	1:46.73	Aymeric Lusine; France	1:47.18
1500 metres	Timo Benitz; Germany	3:43.45	Alexis Miellet; France	3:43.91	Jonathan Davies; Great Britain	3:43.99
5000 metres	François Barrer; France	14:00.86	Jonathan Davies; Great Britain	14:02.46	Andreas Vojta; Austria	14:02.65
10,000 metres	Sadic Bahati; Uganda	29:08.68 PB	Nicolae Soare; Romania	29:12.76 PB	Kazuya Shiojiri; Japan	29:20.96
110 metres hurdles	Balázs Baji; Hungary	13.35	Chen Kuei-ru; Chinese Taipei	13.55 NR	Damian Czykier; Poland	13.56
400 metres hurdles	Juander Santos; Dominican Republic	48.65	Chen Chieh; Chinese Taipei	49.05 PB	Abdelmalik Lahoulou; Algeria	49.30
3000 metres steeplechase	Krystian Zalewski; Poland	8:35.88	Rantso Mokopane; South Africa	8:36.25	Ali Messaoudi; Algeria	8:37.14
4x100 metres relay	Japan (JPN); Yusuke Tanaka; Shuhei Tada; Sho Kitagawa; Jun Yamashita	38.65 SB	United States (USA); John Lewis III; LeShon Collins; Jacarias Martin; Cameron Burrell	38.69	Chinese Taipei (TPE); Wei Yi-ching; Yang Chun-han; Cheng Po-yu; Chen Chia-hsun	39.06 SB
4x400 metres relay	Dominican Republic (DOM); Juander Santos; Luis Charles; Andito Charles; Luguelín Santos; Kendris Díaz*	3:04.34	United States (USA); Amere Lattin; Curtis Brown; Jordan Clarke; Kahmari Montgomery	3:06.68	Czech Republic (CZE); Jan Tesař; Lukáš Hodboď; Filip Šnejdr; Vít Müller; Martin Juránek*	3:08.14
Half marathon	Kei Katanishi; Japan	1:06:09	Naoki Kudo; Japan	1:06:23	Kengo Suzuki; Japan	1:06:56
Half marathon team	Japan (JPN)	3:19:28	South Africa (RSA)	3:31:38	Turkey (TUR)	3:34:42
20 kilometres walk	Toshikazu Yamanishi; Japan	1:27:30	Julio César Salazar; Mexico	1:28:20	Fumitaka Oikawa; Japan	1:30:11
20 km walk team	Japan (JPN)	4:28:41	Mexico (MEX)	4:29:14	Ukraine (UKR)	4:41:34
High jump	Falk Wendrich; Germany	2.29 m PB	Marco Fassinotti; Italy	2.29 m SB	Hsiang Chun-hsien; Chinese Taipei	2.26 m SB
Pole vault	Diogo Ferreira; Portugal	5.55 m	Sergey Grigoryev; Kazakhstan	5.50 m	Claudio Stecchi; Italy	5.40 m
Long jump	Radek Juška; Czech Republic	8.02 m	Yasser Triki; Algeria	7.96 m	Raihau Maiau; France	7.91 m
Triple jump	Nazim Babayev; Azerbaijan	17.01 m	Hugues Fabrice Zango; Burkina Faso	16.97 m PB	Ryoma Yamamoto; Japan	16.80 m
Shot put	Francisco Belo; Portugal	20.86 m PB	Konrad Bukowiecki; Poland	20.16 m	Andrei Gag; Romania	20.12 m
Discus throw	Reginald Jagers III; United States	61.24 m	Alin Firfirică; Romania	61.13 m	Róbert Szikszai; Hungary	60.91 m
Hammer throw	Paweł Fajdek; Poland	79.16 m	Pavel Bareisha; Belarus	77.98 m	Serghei Marghiev; Moldova	74.98 m
Javelin throw	Cheng Chao-tsun; Chinese Taipei	91.36 m UR, AS	Andreas Hofmann; Germany	91.07 m PB	Huang Shih-feng; Chinese Taipei	86.64 m PB
Decathlon	Kyle Cranston; Australia	7687 SB	Juuso Hassi; Finland	7566	Aaron Booth; New Zealand	7523 PB

* Indicates the athlete only competed in the preliminary heats and received medals.

=== Women's events ===
Event	Gold		Silver		Bronze	
100 metres	Sashalee Forbes; Jamaica	11.18	Irene Siragusa; Italy	11.31 PB	Salomé Kora; Switzerland	11.33
200 metres	Irene Siragusa; Italy	22.96 PB	Gunta Latiševa-Čudare; Latvia	23.15 PB	Anna Bongiorni; Italy	23.47
400 metres	Małgorzata Hołub-Kowalik; Poland	51.76	Justine Palframan; South Africa	51.83 SB	Bianca Răzor; Romania	51.97
800 metres	Rose Mary Almanza; Cuba	2:02.21	Olha Lyakhova; Ukraine	2:03.11	Dorcus Ajok; Uganda	2:03.22
1500 metres	Amela Terzić; Serbia	4:19.18	Dorcus Ajok; Uganda	4:19.48	Kristiina Mäki; Czech Republic	4:20.65
5000 metres	Hanna Klein; Germany	15:45.28	Jessica O'Connell; Canada	15:50.96	Jessica Judd; Great Britain	15:51.19
10,000 metres	Darya Maslova; Kyrgyzstan	33:19.27	Sanjivani Jadhav; India	33:22.00 PB	Ai Hosoda; Japan	33:27.89
100 metres hurdles	Nadine Visser; Netherlands	12.98	Elvira Herman; Belarus	13.17	Luca Kozák; Hungary	13.19
400 metres hurdles	Ayomide Folorunso; Italy	55.63 SB	Joanna Linkiewicz; Poland	55.90	Olena Kolesnichenko; Ukraine	56.14
3000 metres steeplechase	Tuğba Güvenç; Turkey	9:51.27	Viktória Gyürkés; Hungary	9:52.17	Özlem Kaya; Turkey	9:52.59
4x100 metres relay	Switzerland (SUI); Ajla Del Ponte; Salomé Kora; Cornelia Halbheer; Selina von Jackowski	43.81	Poland (POL); Kamila Ciba; Agata Forkasiewicz; Małgorzata Kołdej; Karolina Zagajewska	44.19	Japan (JPN); Sayaka Takeuchi; Mizuki Nakamura; Ichiko Iki; Miyu Maeyama	44.56 SB
4x400 metres relay	Poland (POL); Małgorzata Hołub-Kowalik; Iga Baumgart; Patrycja Wyciszkiewicz; Justyna Święty-Ersetic; Aleksandra Gaworska*; Martyna Dąbrowska*	3:26.75	Mexico (MEX); Dania Aguillón; Natali Brito; Leticia Cook; Paola Morán	3:33.98 SB	Romania (ROU); Anamaria Nesteriuc; Sanda Belgyan; Camelia Gal; Bianca Răzor	3:34.16
Half marathon	Yuki Munehisa; Japan	1:13:48	Esma Aydemir; Turkey	1:14:28	Saki Fukui; Japan	1:14:37
Half marathon team	Japan (JPN)	3:43:35	Turkey (TUR)	3:55:13	Chinese Taipei (TPE)	4:05:52
20 kilometres walk	Inna Kashyna; Ukraine	1:39:44	Zhang Xin; China	1:41:18	Elisa Neuvonen; Finland	1:42:50
20 km walk team	Ukraine (UKR)	5:12:01	China (CHN)	5:19:12	None awarded	
High jump	Oksana Okunyeva; Ukraine	1.97 m =SB	Iryna Herashchenko; Ukraine	1.91 m	Airinė Palšytė; Lithuania	1.91 m
Pole vault	Iryna Zhuk; Belarus	4.40 m	Annika Roloff; Germany	4.40 m	Marta Onofre; Portugal	4.40 m SB
Long jump	Alina Rotaru; Romania	6.65 m	Nektaria Panagi; Cyprus	6.42 m	Anna Bühler; Germany	6.38 m
Triple jump	Neele Eckhardt; Germany	13.91 m	Fu Luna; China	13.59 m PB	Māra Grīva; Latvia	13.58 m SB
Shot put	Brittany Crew; Canada	18.34 m	Klaudia Kardasz; Poland	17.90 m PB	Paulina Guba; Poland	17.76 m
Discus throw	Kristin Pudenz; Germany	59.09 m	Valarie Allman; United States	58.36 m	Taryn Gollshewsky; Australia	58.11 m
Hammer throw	Malwina Kopron; Poland	76.85 m UR, PB	Hanna Malyshchyk; Belarus	74.93 m	Joanna Fiodorow; Poland	71.33 m
Javelin throw	Marcelina Witek; Poland	63.31 m PB	Marina Saito; Japan	62.37 m PB	Jenni Kangas; Finland	60.98 m PB
Heptathlon	Verena Preiner; Austria	6224	Alysha Burnett; Australia	5835 PB	Noor Vidts; Belgium	5728

* Indicates the athlete only competed in the preliminary heats and received medals.

== Medal table ==
Rank	Nation	Gold	Silver	Bronze	Total
1	Japan (JPN)	7	2	7	16
2	Poland (POL)	6	4	4	14
3	Germany (GER)	5	2	1	8
4	Ukraine (UKR)	3	2	2	7
5	Dominican Republic (DOM)	3	0	0	3
6	Chinese Taipei (TPE)*	2	2	4	8
7	Italy (ITA)	2	2	2	6
8	France (FRA)	2	1	2	5
9	Portugal (POR)	2	0	1	3
10	United States (USA)	1	3	1	5
11	Belarus (BLR)	1	3	0	4
11	Mexico (MEX)	1	3	0	4
13	Romania (ROU)	1	2	3	6
14	Turkey (TUR)	1	2	2	5
15	Canada (CAN)	1	2	0	3
16	Hungary (HUN)	1	1	2	4
17	Australia (AUS)	1	1	1	3
17	Uganda (UGA)	1	1	1	3
19	Cuba (CUB)	1	1	0	2
20	Czech Republic (CZE)	1	0	2	3
21	Austria (AUT)	1	0	1	2
21	Switzerland (SUI)	1	0	1	2
23	Azerbaijan (AZE)	1	0	0	1
23	Jamaica (JAM)	1	0	0	1
23	Kyrgyzstan (KGZ)	1	0	0	1
23	Netherlands (NED)	1	0	0	1
23	Serbia (SRB)	1	0	0	1
28	South Africa (RSA)	0	4	0	4
29	China (CHN)	0	3	0	3
30	Algeria (ALG)	0	2	2	4
31	Finland (FIN)	0	1	2	3
31	Great Britain (GBR)	0	1	2	3
33	Latvia (LAT)	0	1	1	2
34	Burkina Faso (BUR)	0	1	0	1
34	Cyprus (CYP)	0	1	0	1
34	India (IND)	0	1	0	1
34	Kazakhstan (KAZ)	0	1	0	1
38	Belgium (BEL)	0	0	1	1
38	Lithuania (LTU)	0	0	1	1
38	Moldova (MDA)	0	0	1	1
38	New Zealand (NZL)	0	0	1	1
38	Slovakia (SVK)	0	0	1	1
Totals (42 entries)		50	50	49	149

== Participating nations ==
- Albania (2)
- Algeria (15)
- Argentina (12)
- Aruba (2)
- Australia (45)
- Austria (7)
- Azerbaijan (2)
- Belarus (7)
- Belgium (10)
- Bermuda (3)
- Bosnia and Herzegovina (1)
- Bolivia (1)
- Botswana (8)
- Brazil (22)
- Bulgaria (4)
- Burkina Faso (4)
- Cameroon (2)
- Canada (51)
- Central African Republic (1)
- Chile (8)
- China (28)
- Chinese Taipei (47)
- Colombia (11)
- Costa Rica (3)
- Croatia (6)
- Cuba (2)
- Cyprus (4)
- Czech Republic (17)
- Democratic Republic of the Congo (1)
- Denmark (30)
- Dominican Republic (11)
- Ecuador (1)
- El Salvador (1)
- Equatorial Guinea (2)
- Estonia (22)
- Ethiopia (1)
- Federated States of Micronesia (1)
- Finland (19)
- France (16)
- Germany (25)
- Ghana (10)
- Great Britain (20)
- Greece (1)
- Guatemala (1)
- Guyana (2)
- Honduras (1)
- Hong Kong (7)
- Hungary (15)
- India (17)
- Indonesia (4)
- Iraq (3)
- Ireland (11)
- Israel (5)
- Italy (23)
- Ivory Coast (2)
- Jamaica (15)
- Japan (37)
- Jordan (2)
- Kazakhstan (24)
- Kenya (7)
- Kyrgyzstan (2)
- Latvia (18)
- Lebanon (8)
- Lesotho (2)
- Lithuania (21)
- Luxembourg (4)
- Macau (3)
- Macedonia (1)
- Madagascar (1)
- Malaysia (8)
- Mexico (28)
- Moldova (3)
- Mongolia (5)
- Montenegro (2)
- Namibia (2)
- Nepal (1)
- Netherlands (11)
- Niger (2)
- Nigeria (14)
- New Zealand (11)
- Norway (9)
- Oman (12)
- Pakistan (4)
- Paraguay (1)
- Peru (2)
- Philippines (15)
- Poland (53)
- Portugal (11)
- Romania (13)
- Rwanda (2)
- Saudi Arabia (13)
- Senegal (2)
- Serbia (9)
- Sierra Leone (6)
- Singapore (5)
- Slovakia (18)
- Slovenia (21)
- Sri Lanka (21)
- South Africa (42)
- South Korea (21)
- Swaziland (3)
- Sweden (2)
- Switzerland (20)
- Tajikistan (4)
- Tanzania (2)
- Thailand (24)
- Trinidad and Tobago (5)
- Turkey (25)
- Uganda (17)
- Ukraine (23)
- United Arab Emirates (1)
- United States (30)
- Vietnam (2)
- Zambia (8)
- Zimbabwe (3)

== See also ==
- 2017 in the sport of athletics
- FISU World University Games
- University and college sport
