= Azerbaijan at the 2017 Summer Universiade =

- IOC code: AZE
- NOC: National Olympic Committee of the Azerbaijani Republic

in Taipei, Taiwan 19 – 30 July 2017
- Competitors: 19 in 4 sports
- Medals Ranked 24th: Gold 3 Silver 1 Bronze 4 Total 8

Summer Universiade appearances (overview)
- 1995; 1997; 1999; 2001; 2003; 2005; 2007; 2009; 2011; 2013; 2015; 2017; 2019; 2021; 2025; 2027

Azerbaijan participated at the 2017 Summer Universiade, in Taipei, Taiwan with 19 competitors in 4 sports.

== Competitors ==
The following table lists Azerbaijan delegation per sport and gender.

Sport	Men	Women	Total
Athletics	1	1	2
Judo	3	0	3
Taekwondo	8	4	11
Weightlifting	2	0	2
Total	14	5	19

== Medal summary ==
Medals by sport
Sport	1st place, gold medalist(s)	2nd place, silver medalist(s)	3rd place, bronze medalist(s)	Total
Athletics	1	0	0	3
Judo	1	0	1	3
Taekwondo	1	1	3	1
Total	3	1	4	8

== Athletics ==
Athlete	Event	Qualification		Final	
Athlete	Event	Distance	Position	Distance	Position
Nazim Babayev	Men's Triple Jump	16.32	3q	17.01	1st place, gold medalist(s)
Hanna Skydan	Women's Hammer	NM	N/A	Did Not Advance	

== Judo ==
Athlete	Event	Round of 64	Round of 32	Round of 16	Quarterfinals	Repechage 32	Repechage 16	Repechage 8	Final Repechage	Semifinals	Final / BM	
Athlete	Event	Opposition Result	Opposition Result	Opposition Result	Opposition Result	Opposition Result	Opposition Result	Opposition Result	Opposition Result	Opposition Result	Opposition Result	Rank
Firudin Dadashov	Men's -90 kg	Bye	David Bahamon Pinzon (COL); W 10-00	Nicholas Mungai (ITA); W 11-00	Shoichiro Mukai (COL); L 01-11	Bye		Jiri Petr (CZE); W 11-00	Davis Duda (LAT); W 11-00	Bye	Sunggat Zakariyayev (KAZ); W 01S1-00S1	3rd place, bronze medalist(s)
Zelym Kotsoiev	Men's -100 kg	—N/a	Philipp Galandi (GER); W 01S1-00	Vadims Lando (LAT); W 11-00S1	Hadis Ramic (BIH); W 12-00	Bye				Niiaz Bilalov (RUS); W 11S1-00S1	Kentaro Iida (JPN); W 01S2-00S1	1st place, gold medalist(s)
Telman Valiyev	Men's -73 kg	Bye	Amandeep (IND); W 10-00	Wiktor Andrzej Mrowczynski (POL); W 01-00	Bekadil Shaimerdenov (KAZ); W 03S1-00	Bye				Florent Alexis Urani (FRA); L 00S2-01S2	Heoncheol Kang (KOR); L 00S1-11	5

== Taekwondo ==
Athlete	Event	Round of 64	Round of 32	Round of 16	Quarterfinals	Semifinals	Final / BM	
Athlete	Event	Opposition Result	Opposition Result	Opposition Result	Opposition Result	Opposition Result	Opposition Result	Rank
Patimat Abakarova	Women's -53 kg	—N/a	Nahid Kiyanichandeh (IRI); L 8-10	Did Not Advance				17
Farida Azizova	Women's -67 kg	—N/a	Bye	Julyana Al-Sadeq (JOR); W 5-4	Jandi Kim (KOR); L 4-3	Did Not Advance		5
Milad Beigi	Men's -80 kg	Bye	Jean Michel; Fernandes (POR); W 29-1	Bogdan Grechkin (RUS); W 25-8	Hidenori Ebata (JPN); W 32-15	Wei-Ting Liu (TPE); W 12-4	Raul Martínez Gárcia (ESP); W 6-3	1st place, gold medalist(s)
Yaprak Eris	Women's -57 kg	—N/a	Paulina Armeria Vecchi (IRI); L DSQ-0	Did Not Advance				17
Payam Ghobadi Oughaz	Men's -87 kg	Bye	Icaro Miguel Martins Soares (BRA); W 18-2	Lukas Winkler (GER); W 25-2	Seunghwan Lee (KOR); L 11-15	Did Not Advance		5
Said Guliyev	Men's -74 kg	Bye	Bastian Felipe Munoz Garrido (CHI); W 29-11	Hector Federico Alvarez (MEX); W 5-5	Júlio Ferreira (POR); W 8-6	Ramin Hosseingholi Zadeh (IRI); L 13-WDR	Did Not Advance	3rd place, bronze medalist(s)
Radik Isaev	Men's +87 kg	—N/a	Bye	Farshad Ghias Shandi (IRI); W 12-11	Sabit Bugrahan Karakas (POR); W 25-6	Rafail Aiukaev (RUS); L 8-36	Did Not Advance	3rd place, bronze medalist(s)
Gashim Magomedov	Men's -54 kg	—N/a	Bye	Marstio Embrian Hidayatullah (INA); W 29-19	Bailey Malcolm Lewis (AUS); L 10-12	Did Not Advance		5
Ali Mammadov	Men's -58 kg	Luca Ghiotti (SMR); W 24-4	Tawin Hanprab (THA); L 7-21	Did Not Advance				17
Mahammad Mammadov	Men's -63 kg	Bye	Edgar Al; Porras Reyes (MEX); W 21-5	Wing Tai Tin (HKG); W 29-9	Venilton Teixeira (BRA); W 24-13	Mirhashem Hosseini (IRI); L 9-19	Did Not Advance	3rd place, bronze medalist(s)
Safiye Polat	Women's -49 kg	—N/a	Bye	Courtney Eardley (GBR); W 0-DSQ	Ipek Cidem (TUR); L 2-9	Did Not Advance		9
Aykhan Taghizade	Men's -68 kg	Bye	Fabio Franco Mattei (FRA); W 19-7	Jacob Barnett (GBR); W 17-9	Javier Pérez Polo (ESP); W 9-7	Sergey Vardazaryan (ARM); W 31-14	Boris Krasnov (RUS); L 0-2	2nd place, silver medalist(s)

== Weightlifting ==
Athlete	Event	Snatch		Clean & Jerk		Total	Rank
Athlete	Event	Result	Rank	Result	Rank	Total	Rank
Azar Mammadli	Men's 105 kg	160	14	210	6	370	12
Mahammad Mammadli	Men's 62 kg	116	8	140	6	256	7
