= Cyprus at the 2017 Summer Universiade =

- IOC code: CYP
- NOC: Cyprus Olympic Committee
- Website: www.olympic.org.cy

in Taipei, Taiwan 19 – 30 July 2017
- Competitors: 27 in 7 sports
- Medals Ranked 48th: Gold 0 Silver 2 Bronze 0 Total 2

Summer Universiade appearances
- 1959; 1961; 1963; 1965; 1967; 1970; 1973; 1975; 1977; 1979; 1981; 1983; 1985; 1987; 1989; 1991; 1993; 1995; 1997; 1999; 2001; 2003; 2005; 2007; 2009; 2011; 2013; 2015; 2017; 2019; 2021

Cyprus participated at the 2017 Summer Universiade, in Taipei, Taiwan with 27 competitors in 7 sports.

== Competitors ==
The following table lists Cyprus's delegation per sport and gender.

Sport	Men	Women	Total
Athletics	2	2	4
Fencing	1	0	1
Gymnastics	2	0	2
Judo	1	0	1
Taekwondo	3	3	6
Tennis	1	0	1
Volleyball	12	0	12
Total	22	5	27

== Medal summary ==
Medals by sport
Sport	1st place, gold medalist(s)	2nd place, silver medalist(s)	3rd place, bronze medalist(s)	Total
Athletics	0	1	0	1
Taekwondo	0	1	0	1
Total	0	2	0	2

== Athletics ==
=== Track Events ===
Athlete	Event	Round 1		Round 2		Semifinal		Final	
Athlete	Event	Result	Rank	Result	Rank	Result	Rank	Result	Rank
Christos Dimitriou	Men's 1500m	3:55.96	11	—				did not advance	
Christos Dimitriou	Men's 800m	1:52.53	4	—		did not advance			
Natalia Evangelidou	Women's 1500m	4:18.49	1Q	—				4:21.16	6
Natalia Evangelidou	Women's 800m	2:04.56	4q	—		2:03.92	5	did not advance	

=== Field Events ===
Athlete	Event	Qualification		Final	
Athlete	Event	Distance	Position	Distance	Position
Nektaria Panayi	Women's Long Jump	6.14	3q	6.42	2nd place, silver medalist(s)
Alexandros Poursanidis	Men's Hammer	65.45	6Q	NM	—

== Fencing ==
Athlete	Event	Round of 128	Round of 64	Round of 32	Round of 16	Quarterfinal	Semifinal	Final / BM	
Athlete	Event	Opposition Score	Opposition Score	Opposition Score	Opposition Score	Opposition Score	Opposition Score	Opposition Score	Rank
Alex Tofalides	Men's Foil Individual	—	Kevin Jerrold Chan (SGP); W 15-6	Iskander Akhmetov (RUS); W 15-13	Dmytro Chuchukalo (UKR); L 14-15	did not advance			14

== Gymnastics ==
=== Artistic ===
Individual

Athlete	Event	Apparatus						Total	Rank
Athlete	Event	F	PH	R	V	PB	HB	Total	Rank
Marios Georgiou	All-Around	13.800	12.150	13.650	14.200	14.150	12.450	80.400	15
Marios Georgiou	Horizontal Bar	—					12.366	12.366	6

Team

Athlete	Event	Apparatus						Total	Rank
Athlete	Event	F	PH	R	V	PB	HB	Total	Rank
Ilias Georgiou	Team	12.200	12.550	13.450	13.350	13.550	13.400	78.500	25
Marios Georgiou	Team	12.600	13.100	13.550	12.750	14.050	14.100	80.150	17

== Judo ==
Athlete	Event	Round of 64	Round of 32	Round of 16	Quarterfinals	Repechage 32	Repechage 16	Repechage 8	Final Repechage	Semifinals	Final / BM	
Athlete	Event	Opposition Result	Opposition Result	Opposition Result	Opposition Result	Opposition Result	Opposition Result	Opposition Result	Opposition Result	Opposition Result	Opposition Result	Rank
Phedias Konnaris	Men's -81 kg	Bye	Teodor Baldean (BEL); W 00-00	Filips Mikuckis (LAT); L 01S1-02S1	did not advance							N/A

== Taekwondo ==
Athlete	Event	Round of 64	Round of 32	Round of 16	Quarterfinals	Semifinals	Final / BM	
Athlete	Event	Opposition Result	Opposition Result	Opposition Result	Opposition Result	Opposition Result	Opposition Result	Rank
Georgios Kakouris	Men's -74 kg	Bye	Hector Federico Alvarez (MEX); L 8-9	Did Not Advance				
Kyriaki Kouttouki	Women's -46 kg	—	Bye	Carolina Silva Bezerra (BRA); W 2-1	Crystal Lok Yee Chan (CAN); W 26-5	Shae Rom Kim (GER); W 13-13	Iryna Romoldanova (UKR); L 3-5	2nd place, silver medalist(s)
Demetris Moustakas	Men's +87 kg	—	Bye	Yoann Alexandre Miangue (FRA); L 3-21	Did Not Advance			
Irene Pasiouli	Women's -49 kg	—	Joohwi Kim (KOR); L 11-20	did not advance				
Despina Pilavaki	Women's -53 kg	—	Renata Garcia De Leon (MEX); L 7-19	did not advance				
Ioannis Pilavakis	Men's -63 kg	Bye	Bernardo Pié (DOM); L 12-15	Did Not Advance				
Pilavaki; Pasiouli; Kouttouki	Women's Team Kyorugi	—	Bye	Brazil (BRA); L WDR-0	did not advance			

== Tennis ==
Athlete	Event	Round 1	Round 2	Round 3	Round 4	Quarterfinals	Semifinals	Final / BM	
Athlete	Event	Opposition Score	Opposition Score	Opposition Score	Opposition Score	Opposition Score	Opposition Score	Opposition Score	Rank
Konstantinos Christoforou	Men's Singles	Bye	Denis Yevseyev (KAZ); L RET-1	Did Not Advance					

== Volleyball ==
=== Men's tournament ===
Group Stage

Pos	Team	Pld	W	L	Pts	SW	SL	SR	SPW	SPL	SPR	Qualification
1	Iran	5	5	0	15	15	2	7.500	419	317	1.322	Quarterfinals
2	Argentina	5	4	1	12	13	3	4.333	381	305	1.249	Quarterfinals
3	Switzerland	5	3	2	8	10	9	1.111	447	407	1.098	9th–16th place
4	Canada	5	2	3	6	8	11	0.727	390	426	0.915	9th–16th place
5	Cyprus	5	1	4	3	3	13	0.231	297	394	0.754	17th–22nd place
6	United Arab Emirates	5	0	5	1	4	15	0.267	367	452	0.812	17th–22nd place

Date	Time		Score		Set 1	Set 2	Set 3	Set 4	Set 5	Total	Report
20 Aug	13:00	Cyprus	0–3	Iran	18–25	14–25	12–25			44–75	P2 P3
21 Aug	18:00	Cyprus	0–3	Argentina	16–25	23–25	10–25			49–75	P2 P3
22 Aug	20:00	Canada	3–0	Cyprus	25–15	25–22	25–15			75–52	P2 P3
24 Aug	18:00	Cyprus	3–1	United Arab Emirates	23–25	25–23	25–23	25–23		98–94	P2 P3
25 Aug	18:00	Switzerland	3–0	Cyprus	25–18	25–17	25–19			75–54	P2 P3

17th–22nd place quarterfinals

Date	Time		Score		Set 1	Set 2	Set 3	Set 4	Set 5	Total	Report
27 Aug	18:00	Cyprus	3–1	Chile	25–19	28–26	19–25	25–18		97–88	P2 P3

17th–20th place semifinals

Date	Time		Score		Set 1	Set 2	Set 3	Set 4	Set 5	Total	Report
28 Aug	15:00	Latvia	3–1	Cyprus	25–19	22–25	25–23	25–22		97–89	P2 P3

19th place match

Date	Time		Score		Set 1	Set 2	Set 3	Set 4	Set 5	Total	Report
29 Aug	13:00	Australia	3–0	Cyprus	28–26	25–19	25–16			78–61	P2 P3
