= Zimbabwe at the 2021 Summer World University Games =

- Flag of Zimbabwe
- IOC code: ZIM

in Chengdu, China 28 July 2023 – 8 August 2023
- Competitors: 5 (3 men and 2 women)
- Medals: Gold 0 Silver 0 Bronze 0 Total 0

Summer World University Games appearances
- 1959; 1961; 1963; 1965; 1967; 1970; 1973; 1975; 1977; 1979; 1981; 1983; 1985; 1987; 1989; 1991; 1993; 1995; 1997; 1999; 2001; 2003; 2005; 2007; 2009; 2011; 2013; 2015; 2017; 2019; 2021; 2025; 2027

Zimbabwe competed at the 2021 Summer World University Games in Chengdu, China held from 28 July to 8 August 2023.

== Competitors ==
Sport	Men	Women	Total
Athletics	1	1	2
Swimming	1	1	2
Tennis	1	0	1
Total	3	2	5

== Athletics ==
Men

Athlete	Event	Heat		Semi-finals		Final	
Athlete	Event	Result	Rank	Result	Rank	Result	Rank
Busani Ndlovu	400 metres hurdles	Did not start					

Women

Athlete	Event	Qualification		Final	
Athlete	Event	Result	Rank	Result	Rank
Wayne Nkomo	Shot put	12.03	14	Did not advance	
Wayne Nkomo	Javelin throw	38.27	22	Did not advance	

== Swimming ==
Men

Athlete	Event	Heat		Semi-finals		Final	
Athlete	Event	Time	Rank	Time	Rank	Time	Rank
Denilson Cyprianos	50 metre backstroke	26.89	27	Did not advance			
Denilson Cyprianos	100 metre backstroke	57.76	28	Did not advance			
Denilson Cyprianos	200 metre backstroke	2:06.54	17	Did not advance			

Women

Athlete	Event	Heat		Semi-finals		Final	
Athlete	Event	Time	Rank	Time	Rank	Time	Rank
Nomvula Mjimba	50 metre freestyle	28.37	33	Did not advance			
Nomvula Mjimba	100 metre freestyle	1:01.79	39	Did not advance			
Nomvula Mjimba	50 metre butterfly	30.17	37	Did not advance			

== Tennis ==
Athlete	Event	Round of 64	Round of 32	Round of 16	Quarter-finals	Semi-finals	Final	
Athlete	Event	Opponent score	Opponent score	Opponent score	Opponent score	Opponent score	Opponent score	Rank
Henry Munengwa	Men's singles	Mwisuke (UGA); W 2–0	de Amorim Rocha (POR); L 0–2	Did not advance				
