= Democratic Republic of the Congo at the 2017 Summer Universiade =

- IOC code: COD
- NOC: Comité Olympique Congolais

in Taipei, Taiwan 19 – 30 August 2017
- Competitors: 12 in 5 sports
- Medals: Gold 0 Silver 0 Bronze 0 Total 0

Summer Universiade appearances
- 1959; 1961; 1963; 1965; 1967; 1970; 1973; 1975; 1977; 1979; 1981; 1983; 1985; 1987; 1989; 1991; 1993; 1995; 1997; 1999; 2001; 2003; 2005; 2007; 2009; 2011; 2013; 2015; 2017; 2019; 2021

The Democratic Republic of the Congo had 12 athletes competing in 5 sports at the 2017 Summer Universiade, in Taipei, Taiwan, from August 19 to August 30, 2017. Congolese athletes took part in athletics, badminton, judo, taekwondo, and tennis. None of them won any medals.

== Competitors ==
The following table lists DR Congo's competitors by sport and gender.

Sport	Men	Women	Total
Athletics	1	0	1
Badminton	2	2	4
Judo	3	0	3
Taekwondo	0	2	2
Tennis	1	1	2
Total	7	5	12

== Athletics ==
One athlete in the DRC delegation, Djafar Swedi, competed in the men's long jump event. He placed 48th in the qualification and did not advance to the final.

Field events

Athlete	Event	Qualification		Final	
Athlete	Event	Distance	Position	Distance	Position
Djafar Swedi	Long jump	6.43	48	did not advance	

== Badminton ==
Four badminton players were part of the DR Congo delegation, two men (Joel Kazadi Kazada and Nathan Okito Djimandja) and two women (Pezo Ebengo and Bernice Bokotsha Mbuyi). They were scheduled to compete in the singles and doubles events, as well as the mixed team event, but they did not start.

== Judo ==
Three Congolese male judoka competed at the Summer Universiade, which were Fredo Ngbungbu Yagolo in the 66 kg category, Hagler Kembilu Mbemba at 73 kg, and Lefranc Mashamba Nona at 81 kg. Ngbungbu and Kembilu both lost their first matches against Marko Draskovic of Croatia and Amandeep of India, respectively. Mashamba had a bye in the first round and ended up not competing in his scheduled fight with Norvy Estalin of the Philippines.

Key

- DNS = Did not start

Men

Athlete	Event	1/32 Final	1/16 Final	1/8 Final	Quarterfinals	Semifinals	Repechage	Final of Repechage	Final / BM	
Athlete	Event	Opposition Result	Opposition Result	Opposition Result	Opposition Result	Opposition Result	Opposition Result	Opposition Result	Opposition Result	Rank
Fredo Ngbungbu Yagolo	Men's –66 kg	Draskovic (CRO); L 00–00	did not advance							
Hagler Kembilu Mbemba	Men's –73 kg	Amandeep (IND); L 00–00	did not advance							
Lefranc Mashamba Nona	Men's –81 kg	Bye	Estalin (PHI); DNS	did not advance						

== Taekwondo ==
Two female taekwondo practitioners represented the DRC at the Summer Universiade. Gradi Mpoyi Kamuanya competed in the 57 kg category and Herline Kabanga Lutumba was scheduled to compete in the +73 kg category and individual freestyle poomsae. Kamuanya was defeated by Anisiia Chelokhsaeva of Russia in the first round, with a score of 3-21. Kabanga withdrew from the women's freestyle poomsae and had a bye in the first round of the +73 kg contest. She was later disqualified in her first match against Sara Johanna Zederfeldt of Sweden.

Key

- DSQ = Disqualified

Women

Athlete	Event	Round of 16	Round of 8	Quarterfinals	Semifinals	Final / BM	
Athlete	Event	Opposition Result	Opposition Result	Opposition Result	Opposition Result	Opposition Result	Rank
Gradi Mpoyi Kamuanya	Women's -57 kg	Chelokhsaeva (RUS); L 6-21	did not advance				
Herline Kabanga Lutumba	Women's +73 kg	Bye	Zederfeldt (SWE); DSQ	did not advance			

== Tennis ==
Two tennis players, one man and one woman, were scheduled to compete at the event. Rosine Yongo was going to compete in women's singles and the mixed doubles, while Butela Adegon was due to compete in the mixed doubles. They did not start.
