= Central African Republic at the 2017 Summer Universiade =

- IOC code: CAF
- NOC: Comité National Olympique et Sportif Centrafricain

in Taipei, Taiwan 19 – 30 July 2017
- Competitors: 2 in 2 sports
- Medals: Gold 0 Silver 0 Bronze 0 Total 0

Summer Universiade appearances
- 1959; 1961; 1963; 1965; 1967; 1970; 1973; 1975; 1977; 1979; 1981; 1983; 1985; 1987; 1989; 1991; 1993; 1995; 1997; 1999; 2001; 2003; 2005; 2007; 2009; 2011; 2013; 2015; 2017; 2019; 2021; 2025; 2027

The Central African Republic participated at the 2017 Summer Universiade, in Taipei, Taiwan, with two competitors in two sports.

== Competitors ==
The following table lists the Central African Republic delegation per sport and gender.

Sport	Men	Women	Total
Athletics	1	0	1
Taekwondo	0	1	1
Total	1	1	2

== Athletics ==
Athlete	Event	Round 1		Round 2		Semifinal		Final	
Athlete	Event	Result	Rank	Result	Rank	Result	Rank	Result	Rank
Prestige Ndarata	100m	13.27	5	did not advance					
Prestige Ndarata	200m	28.78	2Q	—N/a		28.61	8	did not advance	

== Taekwondo ==
Athlete	Event	Round of 64	Round of 32	Round of 16	Quarterfinals	Semifinals	Final / BM	
Athlete	Event	Opposition Result	Opposition Result	Opposition Result	Opposition Result	Opposition Result	Opposition Result	Rank
Abdoulaye Ousseeini	Men's -58 kg	Malek Bani Ahmad (JOR); L 2-19	Did Not Advance					
