= Benin at the 2017 Summer Universiade =

- IOC code: BEN
- NOC: Benin National Olympic and Sports Committee

in Taipei, Taiwan 19 – 30 August 2017
- Competitors: 1 in 1 sport
- Medals: Gold 0 Silver 0 Bronze 0 Total 0

Summer Universiade appearances
- 1959; 1961; 1963; 1965; 1967; 1970; 1973; 1975; 1977; 1979; 1981; 1983; 1985; 1987; 1989; 1991; 1993; 1995; 1997; 1999; 2001; 2003; 2005; 2007; 2009; 2011; 2013; 2015; 2017; 2019; 2021; 2025; 2027

Benin participated at the 2017 Summer Universiade in Taipei, Taiwan with one competitor in one sport.

== Competitors ==
The following table lists Benin's delegation per sport and gender.

Sport	Men	Women	Total
Taekwondo	1	0	1
Total	1	0	1

== Taekwondo ==
Athlete	Event	Round of 64	Round of 32	Round of 16	Quarterfinal	Semifinal	Final / BM	
Athlete	Event	Opposition Result	Opposition Result	Opposition Result	Opposition Result	Opposition Result	Opposition Result	Rank
Finagn Kiki Jehudiel	Men's -68 kg	—	Ismael Yacouba Garba (NIG); L 7-10	Did not advance				17
