= Bolivia at the 2017 Summer Universiade =

- IOC code: BOL
- NOC: Bolivian Olympic Committee

in Taipei, Taiwan 19 – 30 August 2017
- Competitors: 2 in 2 sports
- Medals: Gold 0 Silver 0 Bronze 0 Total 0

Summer Universiade appearances
- 1959; 1961; 1963; 1965; 1967; 1970; 1973; 1975; 1977; 1979; 1981; 1983; 1985; 1987; 1989; 1991; 1993; 1995; 1997; 1999; 2001; 2003; 2005; 2007; 2009; 2011; 2013; 2015; 2017; 2019; 2021; 2025; 2027

Belarus participated at the 2017 Summer Universiade in Taipei, Taiwan with 2 competitors in 2 sports.

== Competitors ==
The following table lists Bolivia's delegation per sport and gender.

| Sport | Men | Women | Total |
|---|---|---|---|
| Athletics | 0 | 1 | 1 |
| Swimming | 1 | 0 | 1 |
| Total | 1 | 1 | 2 |

== Athletics ==
=== Women ===
==== Track & road events ====
| Athlete | Event | Round 1 | | Round 2 | | Semifinal | | Final | |
| Athlete | Event | Result | Rank | Result | Rank | Result | Rank | Result | Rank |
|---|---|---|---|---|---|---|---|---|---|
| Claudia Alejand Cornejo Aliaga | 10000 m | — | | | | | | DNS | |
| Claudia Alejand Cornejo Aliaga | Half marathon | — | | | | | | DNF | |

== Swimming ==
=== Men ===
| Athlete | Event | Heat | | Semifinal | | Final | |
| Athlete | Event | Time | Rank | Time | Rank | Time | Rank |
|---|---|---|---|---|---|---|---|
| Enriqe Fernand Nava Miranda | 50 m butterfly | 28.93 | 5 | Did not advance | | | 73 |
| Enriqe Fernand Nava Miranda | 200 m individual medley | 2:22.75 | 1 | Did not advance | | | 46 |
| Enriqe Fernand Nava Miranda | 400 m individual medley | 5:05.80 | 2 | Did not advance | | | 28 |
