= Ethiopia at the 2017 Summer Universiade =

- IOC code: ETH

in Taipei July 19-30
- Competitors: 1 (1 men & 0 women) in 1 sport
- Medals: Gold 0 Silver 0 Bronze 0 Total 0

Summer Universiade appearances
- 1959; 1961; 1963; 1965; 1967; 1970; 1973; 1975; 1977; 1979; 1981; 1983; 1985; 1987; 1989; 1991; 1993; 1995; 1997; 1999; 2001; 2003; 2005; 2007; 2009; 2011; 2013; 2015; 2017; 2019; 2021

Ethiopia participated at the 2017 Summer Universiade which was held in Taipei, Taiwan.

Ethiopia sent a delegation consisting of only 1 competitor for the event competing in a single sporting event. Ethiopia didn't claim any medals at the multi-sport event.

== Participants ==
Sport	Men	Women	Total
Athletics	1	0	1
