= Cameroon at the 2017 Summer Universiade =

- IOC code: CMR
- NOC: Malagasy Olympic Committee

in Taipei July 19-30
- Competitors: 2 (1 man & 1 woman) in 2 sports
- Medals: Gold 0 Silver 0 Bronze 0 Total 0

Summer Universiade appearances
- 1959; 1961; 1963; 1965; 1967; 1970; 1973; 1975; 1977; 1979; 1981; 1983; 1985; 1987; 1989; 1991; 1993; 1995; 1997; 1999; 2001; 2003; 2005; 2007; 2009; 2011; 2013; 2015; 2017; 2019; 2021

Cameroon participated at the 2017 Summer Universiade which was held in Taipei, Taiwan.

Cameroon sent a delegation consisting of only 2 competitors for the event competing in a single sporting event. Cameroon did not claim any medals at the multi-sport event.

== Participants ==
Sport	Men	Women	Total
Athletics	1	1	2

== Athletics ==
=== Track Events ===
Athlete	Event	Round 1		Round 2		Semifinal		Final	
Athlete	Event	Result	Rank	Result	Rank	Result	Rank	Result	Rank
Germaine Emelin Abessolo Bivina	Women's 100m	12.00	4q	12.11	8	Did Not Advance			
Germaine Emelin Abessolo Bivina	Women's 200m	24.65	1Q	—		24.46	6	Did Not Advance	

=== Field Events ===
Athlete	Event	Qualification		Final	
Athlete	Event	Distance	Position	Distance	Position
Marcel Richard Mayack II	Triple Jump	15.68	8q	15.67	10
Marcel Richard Mayack II	High Jump	2.05	10	did not advance	
Marcel Richard Mayack II	Long Jump	7.69	1q	7.48	10
