= Bermuda at the 2017 Summer Universiade =

- IOC code: BER
- NOC: Bermuda Olympic Association

in Taipei, Taiwan 19 – 30 August 2017
- Competitors: 3 in 1 sport
- Medals: Gold 0 Silver 0 Bronze 0 Total 0

Summer Universiade appearances
- 1959; 1961; 1963; 1965; 1967; 1970; 1973; 1975; 1977; 1979; 1981; 1983; 1985; 1987; 1989; 1991; 1993; 1995; 1997; 1999; 2001; 2003; 2005; 2007; 2009; 2011; 2013; 2015; 2017; 2019; 2021; 2025; 2027

Bermuda participated at the 2017 Summer Universiade in Taipei, Taiwan, with 3 competitors in 1 sport.

== Competitors ==
The following table lists Bermuda's delegation per sport and gender.

Sport	Men	Women	Total
Athletics	3	0	3
Total	3	0	3

== Athletics ==
=== Men ===
==== Track events ====
Athlete	Event	Heat		Semifinal		Final	
Athlete	Event	Result	Rank	Result	Rank	Result	Rank
Shaquille Allen Dill	800 metres	1:51.20	14 q	1:54.70	24	did not advance	
Tage Teako Minors	800 metres	1:51.43	19	did not advance			

==== Field events ====
Athlete	Event	Qualification		Final	
Athlete	Event	Distance	Position	Distance	Position
Bruce Leroy DeGrilla Jr.	Long jump	NM	—	did not advance	
