= Cuba at the 2017 Summer Universiade =

- IOC code: CUB
- NOC: Cuban Olympic Committee
- Website: www.olympic.org/cuba

in Taipei, Taiwan 19 – 30 July 2017
- Competitors: 2 in 1 sport
- Medals Ranked 37th: Gold 1 Silver 1 Bronze 0 Total 2

Summer Universiade appearances
- 1959; 1961; 1963; 1965; 1967; 1970; 1973; 1975; 1977; 1979; 1981; 1983; 1985; 1987; 1989; 1991; 1993; 1995; 1997; 1999; 2001; 2003; 2005; 2007; 2009; 2011; 2013; 2015; 2017; 2019; 2021

Cuba participated at the 2017 Summer Universiade, in Taipei, Taiwan with 2 competitors in 1 sport.

== Competitors ==
The following table lists Croatia's delegation per sport and gender.

Sport	Men	Women	Total
Athletics	1	1	2
Total	1	1	2

== Medal summary ==
Medals by sport
Sport	1st place, gold medalist(s)	2nd place, silver medalist(s)	3rd place, bronze medalist(s)	Total
Athletics	1	1	0	2
Total	1	1	0	2

== Athletics ==
Athlete	Event	Round 1		Round 2		Semifinal		Final	
Athlete	Event	Result	Rank	Result	Rank	Result	Rank	Result	Rank
Rose Mary Almanza Blanco	Women's 800m	2:03.78	1Q	—		2:02.22	1Q	2:02.21	1st place, gold medalist(s)
Yoandys Alberto Lescay Pardo	Men's 400m	47.06	1Q	—		46.02	1Q	45.31	2nd place, silver medalist(s)
