= Yemen at the 2017 Summer Universiade =

- IOC code: YEM
- NOC: Yemen Olympic Committee
- Website: yemnoc.org (in Arabic and English)

in Taipei, Taiwan
- Competitors: 1 in 1 sport
- Medals: Gold 0 Silver 0 Bronze 0 Total 0

Summer Universiade appearances
- 1959; 1961; 1963; 1965; 1967; 1970; 1973; 1975; 1977; 1979; 1981; 1983; 1985; 1987; 1989; 1991; 1993; 1995; 1997; 1999; 2001; 2003; 2005; 2007; 2009; 2011; 2013; 2015; 2017; 2019; 2021; 2025; 2027

Yemen participated at the 2017 Summer Universiade in Taipei with only one athlete, who competed in table tennis.

== Table tennis ==
Athlete	Event	Group Stage			Round of 32	Round of 16	Quarterfinals	Semifinals	Final / BM	
Athlete	Event	Opposition Result	Opposition Result	Rank	Opposition Result	Opposition Result	Opposition Result	Opposition Result	Opposition Result	Rank
Fahd Abdulhakim Gubran	Men's singles	Berglund (SWE); L 0-3	Cassin (FRA); L 1-3	65	did not advance					
