= Moldova at the 2017 Summer Universiade =

- IOC code: MDA
- NOC: National Olympic Committee of the Republic of Moldova

in Taipei, Taiwan July 19-30
- Competitors: 13 (10 men & 3 women) in 5 sports
- Medals: Gold 0 Silver 0 Bronze 1 Total 1

Summer Universiade appearances
- 1959; 1961; 1963; 1965; 1967; 1970; 1973; 1975; 1977; 1979; 1981; 1983; 1985; 1987; 1989; 1991; 1993; 1995; 1997; 1999; 2001; 2003; 2005; 2007; 2009; 2011; 2013; 2015; 2017; 2019; 2021; 2025; 2027

Moldova participated at the 2017 Summer Universiade which was held in Taipei, Taiwan.

Moldova sent a delegation consisting of 13 competitors for the event competing in 5 sporting events. Moldova claimed a bronze medal in the multi-sport event.

== Participants ==
Sport	Men	Women	Total
Archery	1	1	2
Athletics	2	1	3
Judo	3	0	3
Taekwondo	2	0	2
Weightlifting	2	1	3

== Medalists ==
Medal	Name	Sport	Event
Bronze	Serghei Marghiev	Athletics	Men's hammer throw
