= Bosnia and Herzegovina at the 2017 Summer Universiade =

- IOC code: BIH
- NOC: Olympic Committee of Bosnia and Herzegovina
- Website: www.okbih.ba (in Bosnian, Serbian, and Croatian)

in Taipei, Taiwan 19 – 30 August 2017
- Competitors: 3 in 2 sports
- Medals: Gold 0 Silver 0 Bronze 0 Total 0

Summer Universiade appearances
- 1959; 1961; 1963; 1965; 1967; 1970; 1973; 1975; 1977; 1979; 1981; 1983; 1985; 1987; 1989; 1991; 1993; 1995; 1997; 1999; 2001; 2003; 2005; 2007; 2009; 2011; 2013; 2015; 2017; 2019; 2021

Bosnia and Herzegovina participated at the 2017 Summer Universiade, in Taipei, Taiwan with 3 competitors in 2 sports.

== Competitors ==
The following table lists Bosnia and Herzegovina's delegation per sport and gender.

Sport	Men	Women	Total
Athletics	1	0	1
Judo	1	1	2

== Athletics ==
Athlete	Event	Round 1		Round 2		Semifinal		Final	
Athlete	Event	Result	Rank	Result	Rank	Result	Rank	Result	Rank
Faris Ibrahimpasic	200m	22.85	6	Did Not Advance					

== Judo ==
Athlete	Event	Round of 64	Round of 32	Round of 16	Quarterfinals	Repechage 32	Repechage 16	Repechage 8	Final Repechage	Semifinals	Final / BM	
Athlete	Event	Opposition Result	Opposition Result	Opposition Result	Opposition Result	Opposition Result	Opposition Result	Opposition Result	Opposition Result	Opposition Result	Opposition Result	Rank
Hadis Ramic	Men's -100 kg	Bye	Jobandeep Singh (IND); W 02–00S2	Matej Hajas (SVK); W 01S2–00	Zelym Kotsoiev (AZE); L 00–12	Bye		Philipp Galandi (GER); L 11–00	did not advance			—
Selma Sejdinovic	Women's -52 kg	—	Diyora Keldiyorova (UZB); W 00–00	Kateryna Chertyl (UKR); L 00–10	Did Not Advance							—
