= 2017 Summer Universiade =

Multi-sport event in Taipei, Taiwan

XXIX Summer Universiade
- Official logo of the 2017 Summer Universiade
- Host city: Taipei, Taiwan
- Country: Republic of China
- Motto: For You, For Youth; Chinese: 獻給你，獻給年輕世代 (Xiàn gěi nǐ, xiàn gěi niánqīng shìdài)
- Nations: 145
- Athletes: 7,376
- Events: 271 in 21 sports
- Opening: 19 August 2017
- Closing: 30 August 2017
- Opened by: President Tsai Ing-wen
- Athlete's Oath: Wu Tsung-hsuan; Chang Kai-chen
- Judge's Oath: Shiu Geng-hau; Lan Mei-fen
- Torch lighter: Chen Chin-Feng
- Main venue: Taipei Municipal Stadium
- Website: 2017.taipei (archived)

Summer

Winter

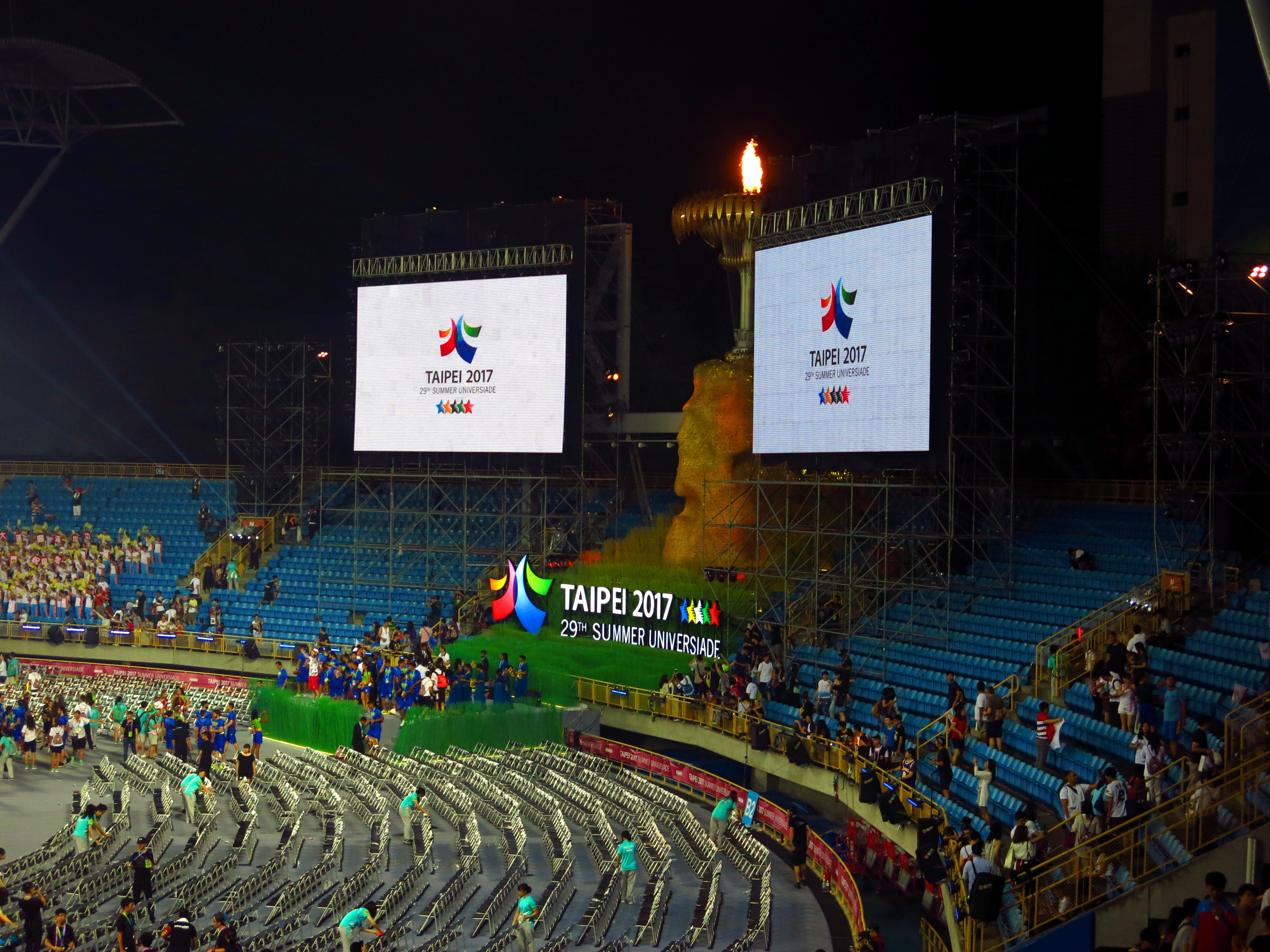
Flame in Taipei Municipal Stadium

The 2017 Summer Universiade (Chinese: 2017年夏季世界大學運動會; pinyin: Èr líng yī qī Nián Xiàjì Shìjiè Dàxué Yùndònghuì), officially known as the XXIX Summer Universiade (Chinese: 第二十九屆夏季世界大學運動會; pinyin: Dì èrshíjiǔ jiè xiàjì shìjiè dàxué yùndònghuì) and commonly called Taipei 2017 (Chinese: 台北2017; pinyin: Táiběi Èr líng yī qī), was a multi-sport event, sanctioned by the International University Sports Federation (FISU), held in the city of Taipei, Taiwan. It took place from August 19 to August 30, 2017.

== Bid selection ==
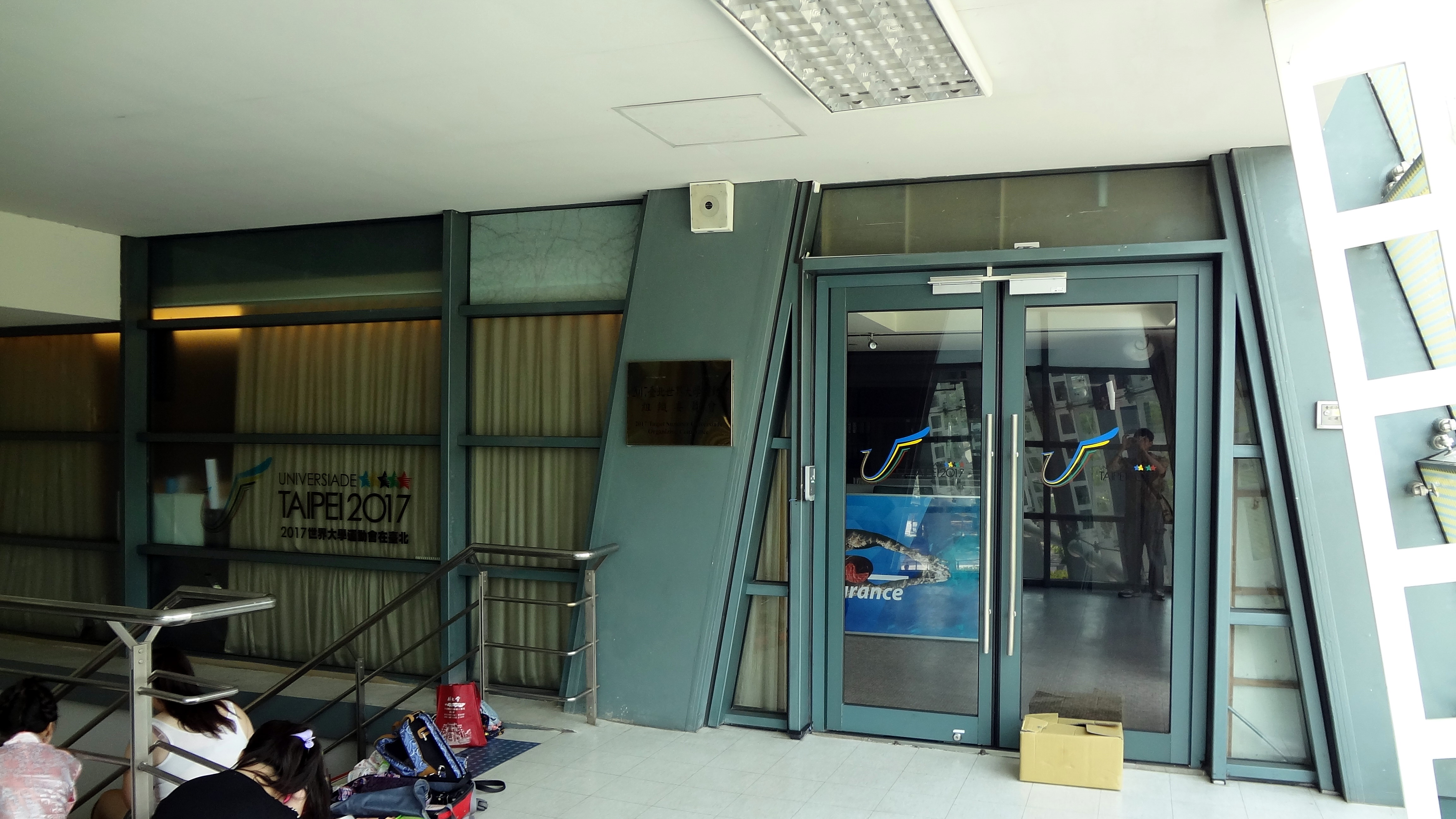
2017 Taipei Summer Universiade Organizing Committee Office Entrance

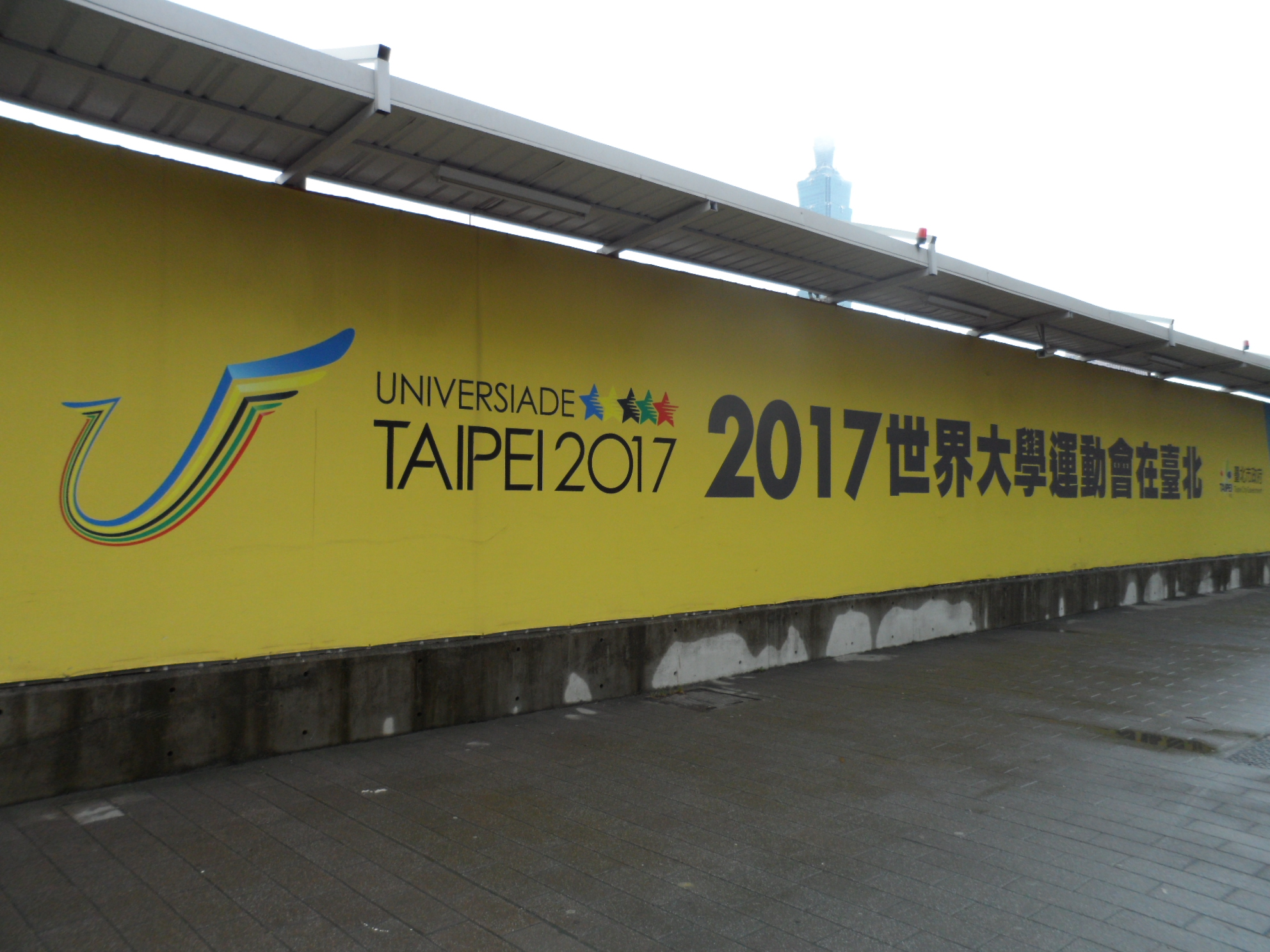
A signboard of the 2017 Summer Universiade in Taipei. Taipei is selected as host of the 2017 Summer Universiade on 29 November 2011.

The cities of Brasília in Brazil and Taipei in Taiwan were in contention for the Games. Taipei was elected as the host city of the 2017 Summer Universiade by FISU on 29 November 2011, in Brussels, Belgium.

== The Games ==
=== Venues ===
- Army Academy R.O.C. Gymnasium (Volleyball)
- Chang Gung University Stadium (Football)
- Chinese Culture University Gymnasium (Volleyball)
- Expo Dome (Billiards)
- Fu Jen Catholic University Stadium (Football)
- Hsinchu County Gymnasium (Judo, Wushu)
- Hsinchu County Natatorium (Water Polo preliminaries and finals)
- Hsinchu County Stadium (Football)
- Hsinchu Municipal Gymnasium (Basketball)
- National Taiwan Normal University Main Campus Gymnasium (Volleyball)
- NTSU Arena (Archery, Swimming, Water Polo finals)
- National Taiwan University Sports Center (Volleyball)
- National Tsing Hua University Gymnasium (Volleyball)
- New Taipei City Breeze Canal (open water swimming)
- New Taipei City Xinzhuang Gymnasium 1F (Table Tennis)
- New Taipei City Xinzhuang Stadium (Football)
- Ren'ai Road, Taipei City (Roller Sports marathons)
- Sunrise Golf and Country Club (Golf)
- Taipei Arena (Basketball)
- Taipei Gymnasium (Badminton)
- Taipei Heping Basketball Gymnasium (Basketball)
- Taipei Municipal Stadium (Athletics, ceremonies)
- Taipei Nangang Exhibition Center (Fencing, Gymnastics)
- Taipei Songshan Sports Center (Water Polo preliminaries)
- Taipei Tennis Center (Tennis)
- Tamkang University Shao-Mo Memorial Gymnasium 7F (Weightlifting)
- Taoyuan Arena (Taekwondo)
- Tianmu Baseball Stadium (Baseball)
- University of Taipei (Tianmu Campus) Gymnasium (Basketball)
- University of Taipei (Tianmu Campus) Shih-hsin Hall B1 Diving Pool (Diving)
- Xinzhuang Baseball Stadium (Baseball)
- Yingfeng Riverside Park Roller Sports Rink (A) (Roller Sports)

==== Venue changes ====
In June 2015, Taipei's Mayor Ko Wen-je announced that organizers had shifted the opening and closing ceremonies from the Taipei Dome to the Taipei Municipal Stadium due to delays in the construction of the domed stadium.

=== Sports ===
21 sports were included in the event. During the bidding process, the organizing committee opted include 14 compulsory sports, and three optional sports, including archery, badminton and taekwondo. Originally, this would be the first edition since the 2003 Summer Universiade in which the number of optional sports would be reduced to 3. However, the organizers later requested to add three extra sports: weightlifting, baseball, and golf due to low interest in the events and the host team's strength in the sports. These suggestions were accepted. Two other local sporting federations which have recently been recognized as University sports by FISU were also accepted (Roller Skating and Wushu). An eighth sport was chosen as an optional sport, billiards. However, it was proposed too late and not in time to be included, in addition to not being recognized by FISU. It was played as a demonstration sport instead.

- Archery (10)
- Aquatics
  - Diving (15)
  - Marathon swimming (2)
  - Swimming (40)
  - Water polo (2)
- Athletics (50)
- Badminton (6)
- Baseball (1)
- Basketball (2)
- Billiard (4)
- Fencing (12)
- Football (2)
- Golf (4)
- Gymnastics
  - Artistic gymnastics (14)
  - Rhythmic gymnastics (8)
- Judo (18)
- Roller Sports (16)
- Table tennis (7)
- Taekwondo (23)
- Tennis (7)
- Volleyball (2)
- Weightlifting (16)
- Wushu (16)

=== Participants ===
A total of 134 nations were officially entered prior to the opening ceremony. In the list below, the number of athletes from each nation is given in parentheses. The largest nation teams were Chinese Taipei, Russia, United States and Japan.

In May 2017, China officially announced that it would not be sending teams to participate in team events, but individual Chinese athletes are allowed to travel to Taiwan and compete in the individual events.

Days before the opening ceremony, Ugandan sports official Norman Katende stated that the Ugandan team had been ordered not to travel to Taiwan because of their country's adherence to the "one China" policy. Katende published a letter received from the Ugandan Ministry of Foreign Affairs reading "The purpose of this letter is to inform you of 'the one china [sic] policy', which is the position of the government of Uganda. In this regard therefore the Ministry of Foreign Affairs is advising that your Ministry does not send an official delegation to participate." The Taiwanese Ministry of Foreign Affairs representative Eleanor Wang said "The Uganda team is still trying to talk with its government and is hoping to be allowed to attend the games in Taipei." In an update on 15 August, Katende published a statement from Makerere University Sports and Recreation Department head Peninnah Kabenge, citing "overaction [sic] and misunderstanding" for the Ministry's actions. Ms. Kabenge later confirmed this, writing "It is official team UGANDA is on the way to the 29th Universiade."

- Afghanistan (3)
- Albania (2)
- Algeria (33)
- Argentina (178)
- Armenia (16)
- Australia (185)
- Austria (41)
- Azerbaijan (19)
- Bahamas (4)
- Belarus (34)
- Belgium (30)
- Benin (1)
- Bermuda (3)
- Bhutan (7)
- Bolivia (2)
- Bosnia and Herzegovina (3)
- Botswana (20)
- Brazil (180)
- Bulgaria (10)
- Burkina Faso (6)
- Burundi (2)
- Cameroon (2)
- Canada (275)
- Central African Republic (2)
- Chile (62)
- China (108)
- Colombia (81)
- Costa Rica (8)
- Croatia (38)
- Cuba (2)
- Cyprus (27)
- Czech Republic (139)
- Democratic Republic of the Congo (12)
- Denmark (51)
- Dominican Republic (26)
- Ecuador (1)
- El Salvador (2)
- Equatorial Guinea (2)
- Estonia (88)
- Ethiopia (1)
- Federated States of Micronesia (1)
- Finland (85)
- France (224)
- Germany (126)
- Ghana (11)
- Great Britain (112)
- Greece (21)
- Guatemala (2)
- Guyana (2)
- Haiti (3)
- Honduras (7)
- Hong Kong (111)
- Hungary (140)
- India (110)
- Indonesia (52)
- Iran (62)
- Iraq (5)
- Ireland (63)
- Israel (40)
- Italy (193)
- Ivory Coast (2)
- Jamaica (16)
- Japan (336)
- Jordan (15)
- Kazakhstan (122)
- Kenya (7)
- Kyrgyzstan (7)
- Kuwait (69)
- Latvia (71)
- Lebanon (49)
- Lesotho (2)
- Liechtenstein (6)
- Lithuania (66)
- Luxembourg (11)
- Macau (31)
- Macedonia (3)
- Madagascar (2)
- Malaysia (63)
- Mali (2)
- Malta (4)
- Mexico (211)
- Moldova (13)
- Mongolia (51)
- Montenegro (6)
- Mozambique (14)
- Namibia (2)
- Nepal (18)
- Netherlands (65)
- Netherlands Antilles (2)
- New Zealand (57)
- Nicaragua (3)
- Niger (3)
- Nigeria (59)
- North Korea (31)
- Norway (41)
- Oman (32)
- Pakistan (22)
- Palestine (3)
- Paraguay (10)
- Peru (7)
- Philippines (116)
- Poland (180)
- Portugal (64)
- Romania (89)
- Russia (347)
- Rwanda (2)
- San Marino (2)
- Saudi Arabia (19)
- Senegal (2)
- Serbia (51)
- Sierra Leone (6)
- Singapore (71)
- Slovakia (50)
- Slovenia (61)
- South Africa (127)
- South Korea (318)
- Spain (9)
- Sri Lanka (67)
- Suriname (2)
- Swaziland (3)
- Sweden (68)
- Switzerland (92)
- Syria (4)
- Chinese Taipei (371) (host)
- Tajikistan (7)
- Tanzania (2)
- Thailand (91)
- Trinidad and Tobago (10)
- Turkey (85)
- Turkmenistan (4)
- Uganda (39)
- Ukraine (172)
- United Arab Emirates (29)
- United States (348)
- Uruguay (23)
- Uzbekistan (28)
- Venezuela (1)
- Vietnam (15)
- Yemen (1)
- Zambia (14)
- Zimbabwe (5)

=== Schedule ===
The competition schedule for the 2017 Summer Universiade is shown as follow:

| OC | Opening ceremony | ● | Event competitions | 1 | Event finals | CC | Closing ceremony |

| August | 18th Fri | 19th Sat | 20th Sun | 21st Mon | 22nd Tue | 23rd Wed | 24th Thu | 25th Fri | 26th Sat | 27th Sun | 28th Mon | 29th Tue | 30th Wed | Events |
|---|---|---|---|---|---|---|---|---|---|---|---|---|---|---|
| Ceremonies | | OC | | | | | | | | | | | CC | |
| Aquatics - Diving | | | 2 | 2 | 1 | 1 | 3 | 1 | 1 | 4 | | | | 15 |
| Aquatics - Swimming | | | 4 | 5 | 5 | 7 | 4 | 7 | 8 | 2 | | | | 42 |
| Aquatics - Water polo | ● | ● | ● | ● | ● | ● | ● | ● | ● | ● | ● | 1 | 1 | 2 |
| Archery | | | ● | ● | ● | 5 | 5 | | | | | | | 10 |
| Athletics | | | | | | 2 | 6 | 9 | 11 | 12 | 10 | | | 50 |
| Badminton | | | | | | ● | ● | 1 | | ● | ● | 5 | | 6 |
| Baseball | | | ● | | ● | ● | | ● | ● | ● | ● | 1 | | 1 |
| Basketball | | | ● | ● | ● | ● | ● | ● | ● | ● | 1 | 1 | | 2 |
| Fencing | | | 2 | 2 | 2 | 2 | 2 | 2 | | | | | | 12 |
| Football | ● | ● | ● | ● | ● | ● | ● | ● | ● | ● | 1 | 1 | | 2 |
| Golf | | | | | | | ● | ● | 4 | | | | | 4 |
| Gymnastics | | ● | 1 | 1 | 2 | 10 | | | | ● | 2 | 6 | | 22 |
| Judo | | | 4 | 4 | 4 | 4 | 2 | | | | | | | 18 |
| Roller Sports | | | | 4 | 4 | 4 | | 2 | 2 | | | | | 16 |
| Table tennis | | | | | ● | ● | ● | ● | 2 | 1 | 2 | 2 | | 7 |
| Taekwondo | | | 2 | 3 | 4 | 4 | 4 | 4 | 2 | | | | | 23 |
| Tennis | | | | ● | ● | ● | ● | ● | ● | ● | 2 | 5 | | 7 |
| Volleyball | | | ● | ● | ● | ● | ● | ● | ● | ● | 1 | 1 | | 2 |
| Weightlifting | | | 3 | 3 | 2 | 2 | 3 | 3 | | | | | | 16 |
| Wushu | | | | | | | | | ● | 2 | 2 | 10 | | 14 |
| Daily medal events | 0 | 0 | 18 | 24 | 24 | 41 | 29 | 29 | 30 | 21 | 21 | 33 | 1 | 271 |
| Cumulative total | 0 | 0 | 18 | 42 | 66 | 107 | 136 | 165 | 195 | 216 | 237 | 270 | 271 | |
| Billiards (Demonstration) | | | | | | | | ● | ● | 2 | ● | 2 | | 4 |
| August | 18th Fri | 19th Sat | 20th Sun | 21st Mon | 22nd Tue | 23rd Wed | 24th Thu | 25th Fri | 26th Sat | 27th Sun | 28th Mon | 29th Tue | 30th Wed | Events |

=== Medal table ===
The host nation of the Republic of China is recognized by the name of Chinese Taipei by FISU.

* Host nation (Chinese Taipei)

2017 Summer Universiade medal table
| Rank | Nation | Gold | Silver | Bronze | Total |
|---|---|---|---|---|---|
| 1 | Japan (JPN) | 37 | 27 | 37 | 101 |
| 2 | Chinese Taipei (TPE)* | 30 | 35 | 31 | 96 |
| 3 | South Korea (KOR) | 30 | 22 | 30 | 82 |
| 4 | Russia (RUS) | 25 | 31 | 38 | 94 |
| 5 | United States (USA) | 16 | 19 | 16 | 51 |
| 6 | Ukraine (UKR) | 12 | 11 | 13 | 36 |
| 7 | North Korea (PRK) | 12 | 5 | 6 | 23 |
| 8 | Italy (ITA) | 9 | 6 | 17 | 32 |
| 9 | China (CHN) | 9 | 6 | 2 | 17 |
| 10 | Iran (IRI) | 8 | 4 | 11 | 23 |
| 11 | Poland (POL) | 7 | 9 | 9 | 25 |
| 12 | Germany (GER) | 7 | 6 | 11 | 24 |
| 13 | Mexico (MEX) | 6 | 5 | 11 | 22 |
| 14 | Hungary (HUN) | 5 | 5 | 4 | 14 |
| 15 | France (FRA) | 4 | 5 | 8 | 17 |
| 16 | Canada (CAN) | 4 | 5 | 4 | 13 |
| 17 | Australia (AUS) | 4 | 3 | 2 | 9 |
| 18 | Dominican Republic (DOM) | 4 | 2 | 0 | 6 |
| 19 | Serbia (SRB) | 4 | 0 | 0 | 4 |
| 20 | Turkey (TUR) | 3 | 7 | 6 | 16 |
| 21 | Kazakhstan (KAZ) | 3 | 6 | 7 | 16 |
| 22 | Belarus (BLR) | 3 | 4 | 2 | 9 |
| 23 | Romania (ROU) | 3 | 2 | 6 | 11 |
| 24 | Azerbaijan (AZE) | 3 | 1 | 4 | 8 |
| 25 | Lithuania (LTU) | 3 | 1 | 3 | 7 |
| 26 | Armenia (ARM) | 3 | 1 | 2 | 6 |
| 27 | Thailand (THA) | 2 | 5 | 6 | 13 |
| 28 | Brazil (BRA) | 2 | 4 | 6 | 12 |
| 29 | Portugal (POR) | 2 | 1 | 2 | 5 |
| 30 | Hong Kong (HKG) | 2 | 0 | 2 | 4 |
| 31 | Netherlands (NED) | 2 | 0 | 1 | 3 |
| 32 | Macau (MAC) | 2 | 0 | 0 | 2 |
| 33 | Colombia (COL) | 1 | 3 | 7 | 11 |
| 34 | Finland (FIN) | 1 | 1 | 2 | 4 |
| 35 | Switzerland (SUI) | 1 | 1 | 1 | 3 |
| 35 | Uganda (UGA) | 1 | 1 | 1 | 3 |
| 37 | Cuba (CUB) | 1 | 1 | 0 | 2 |
| 38 | Vietnam (VIE) | 1 | 0 | 4 | 5 |
| 39 | Czech Republic (CZE) | 1 | 0 | 2 | 3 |
| 40 | Austria (AUT) | 1 | 0 | 1 | 2 |
| 41 | Ireland (IRL) | 1 | 0 | 0 | 1 |
| 41 | Jamaica (JAM) | 1 | 0 | 0 | 1 |
| 41 | Kyrgyzstan (KGZ) | 1 | 0 | 0 | 1 |
| 44 | South Africa (RSA) | 0 | 5 | 0 | 5 |
| 45 | Great Britain (GBR) | 0 | 3 | 6 | 9 |
| 46 | Malaysia (MAS) | 0 | 3 | 4 | 7 |
| 47 | Algeria (ALG) | 0 | 3 | 2 | 5 |
| 48 | Mongolia (MGL) | 0 | 2 | 1 | 3 |
| 49 | Cyprus (CYP) | 0 | 2 | 0 | 2 |
| 50 | Latvia (LAT) | 0 | 1 | 2 | 3 |
| 51 | Bahamas (BAH) | 0 | 1 | 1 | 2 |
| 51 | Slovakia (SVK) | 0 | 1 | 1 | 2 |
| 51 | Sweden (SWE) | 0 | 1 | 1 | 2 |
| 54 | Argentina (ARG) | 0 | 1 | 0 | 1 |
| 54 | Burkina Faso (BUR) | 0 | 1 | 0 | 1 |
| 54 | Estonia (EST) | 0 | 1 | 0 | 1 |
| 54 | India (IND) | 0 | 1 | 0 | 1 |
| 54 | Philippines (PHI) | 0 | 1 | 0 | 1 |
| 54 | Spain (ESP) | 0 | 1 | 0 | 1 |
| 60 | Croatia (CRO) | 0 | 0 | 3 | 3 |
| 60 | Indonesia (INA) | 0 | 0 | 3 | 3 |
| 60 | Norway (NOR) | 0 | 0 | 3 | 3 |
| 63 | Belgium (BEL) | 0 | 0 | 1 | 1 |
| 63 | Jordan (JOR) | 0 | 0 | 1 | 1 |
| 63 | Moldova (MDA) | 0 | 0 | 1 | 1 |
| 63 | New Zealand (NZL) | 0 | 0 | 1 | 1 |
| Totals (66 entries) | | 277 | 273 | 346 | 896 |

== Marketing ==
=== Motto ===
The official motto of the games was For You, For Youth (Chinese: 獻給你，獻給年輕世代; pinyin: Xian gěi nǐ, xiàn gěi niánqīng shìdài). It is chosen to represent the assembly of university athletes from around the world to compete and pursue for dreams and victory.

=== Logo ===
The logo of the games was a stylized image of the Chinese character Běi (北), the same character as the second character of the host city, Taipei (臺北 Táiběi). The logo was based on the shape of the letter U, which stands for Universiade, United and University. It was chosen to represent the passion, vitality, hope and positivity. The logo's combination of five colors (blue, yellow, black, green and red) represents the assembly of university athletes from around the world to compete. The logo was designed by Yu Ming-lung.

=== Mascot ===
Bravo the Bear, the official mascot of the games.

The mascot of the games was Bravo the Bear (Chinese: 熊讚; pinyin: Xióng Zàn), a Formosan black bear. The white V on the chest of the Formosan black bear and the gold medal is said to represent the hope of the games athletes in pursuing dreams and victory. The black bear is chosen due to its status as the endangered species in Taiwan, and represents commitment to protecting the natural environment. The mascot name, Bravo, which is an expression of approval in Italian, was chosen to represent athletes' bravery in achieving outstanding results. The Mandarin name of the mascot, Xióng Zàn, sounds like the word "brilliant" in the Taiwanese Min-nan language. The mascot was designed by Yu Ming-lung.

=== Theme song ===
The official theme song of the Taipei 2017 Universiade was "Embrace the World with You" (Chinese: 擁抱世界擁抱你; pinyin: Yōng Bào Shì Jiè Yōng Bào Nǐ), composed by Kris Wu (Paiwan: Utjung Tjakivalid) and sung by I-WANT STAR POWER (Chinese: I-WANT星勢力). The theme song was produced by techno producer Howie B and Taiwanese music producer Ada Su.

== Ceremonies ==
=== Opening ceremony ===
A few weeks before the opening ceremony, FISU and the Organizing Committee confirmed that public would be allowed to bring Taiwan flags into the stadium, though the delegations and volunteers who participate on event would not be allowed to use them.

The opening ceremony on 19 August was affected by several incidents of protest from protestors outside the stadium, as well as hoaxes that one or more Islamic State (ISIS) sympathisers had entered the country and are posing as either as foreign workers or as part of the event's guest teams. Several groups and organizations, including opponents to the pension reform that was carried out in June, also staged protests outside of the Taipei Municipal Stadium which in turn caused security concerns that affected the opening ceremony.

The scheduled plan was for the placard bearer, then the flagbearers, then the athletes of each country to enter the stadium in alphabetical order, starting with Burundi and ending with Zimbabwe, with the host country entering last. Protests outside the stadium prevented all athletes and flagbearers after Burkina Faso from entering the stadium at the scheduled time. Instead, volunteers carried the flags into the stadium in the designated order while the athletes waited outside. Shortly after the volunteer carrying Zimbabwe's flag entered the stadium, all of the placard bearers between Burundi and Zimbabwe entered (not in alphabetical order), followed by all of their athletes. The host country's team, the Chinese Taipei delegation, entered last in the proper order. China did not take part in the Parade of Nations due to political reasons, as announced prior to the ceremony.

Over 5,600 uniformed and plain-clothes Taiwanese police, including Military police armed with rifles, were present to ensure the smooth running of the opening ceremony.

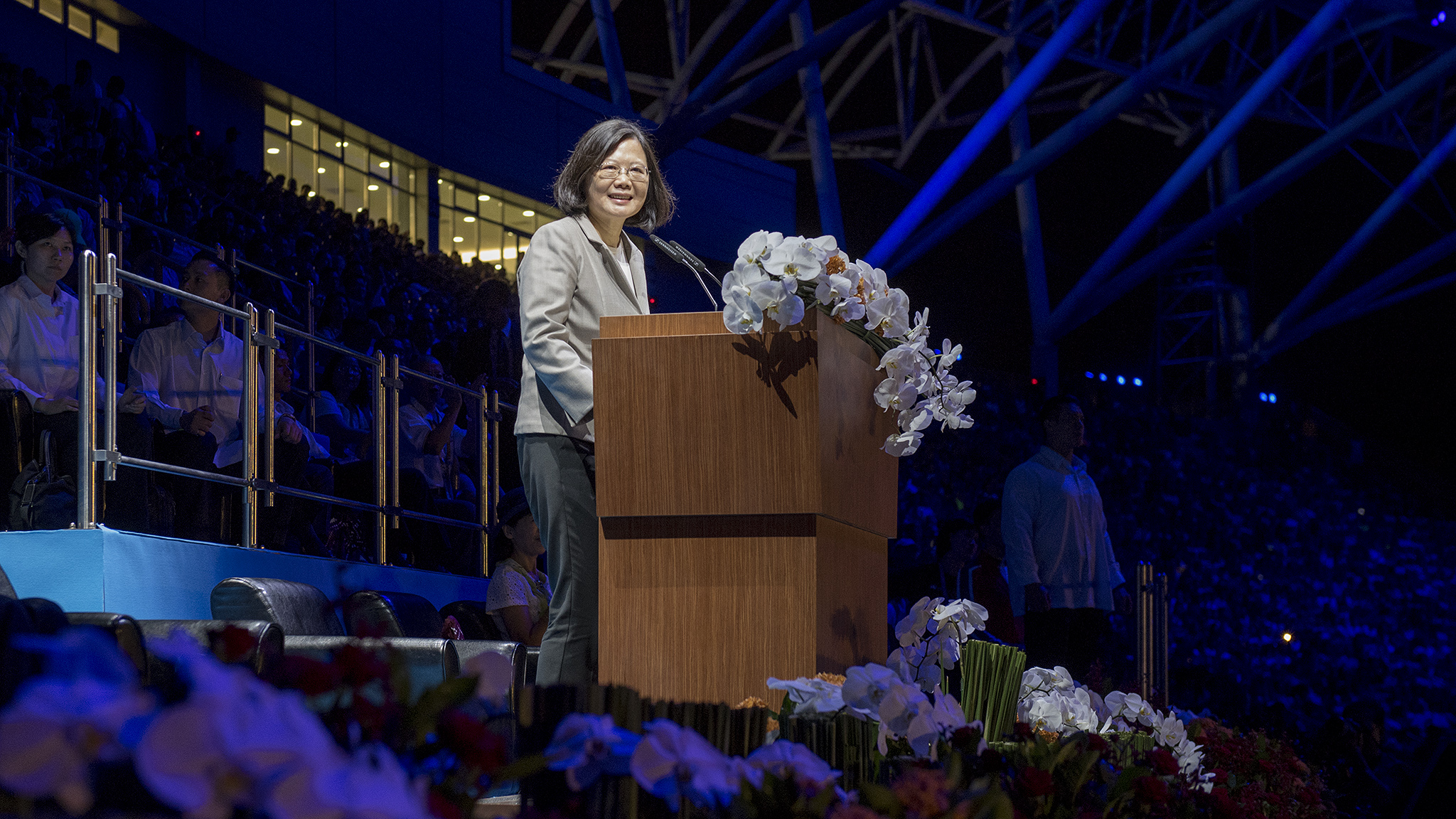
President Tsai Ing-wen officially announces the opening of the Taipei 2017 Summer Universiade.

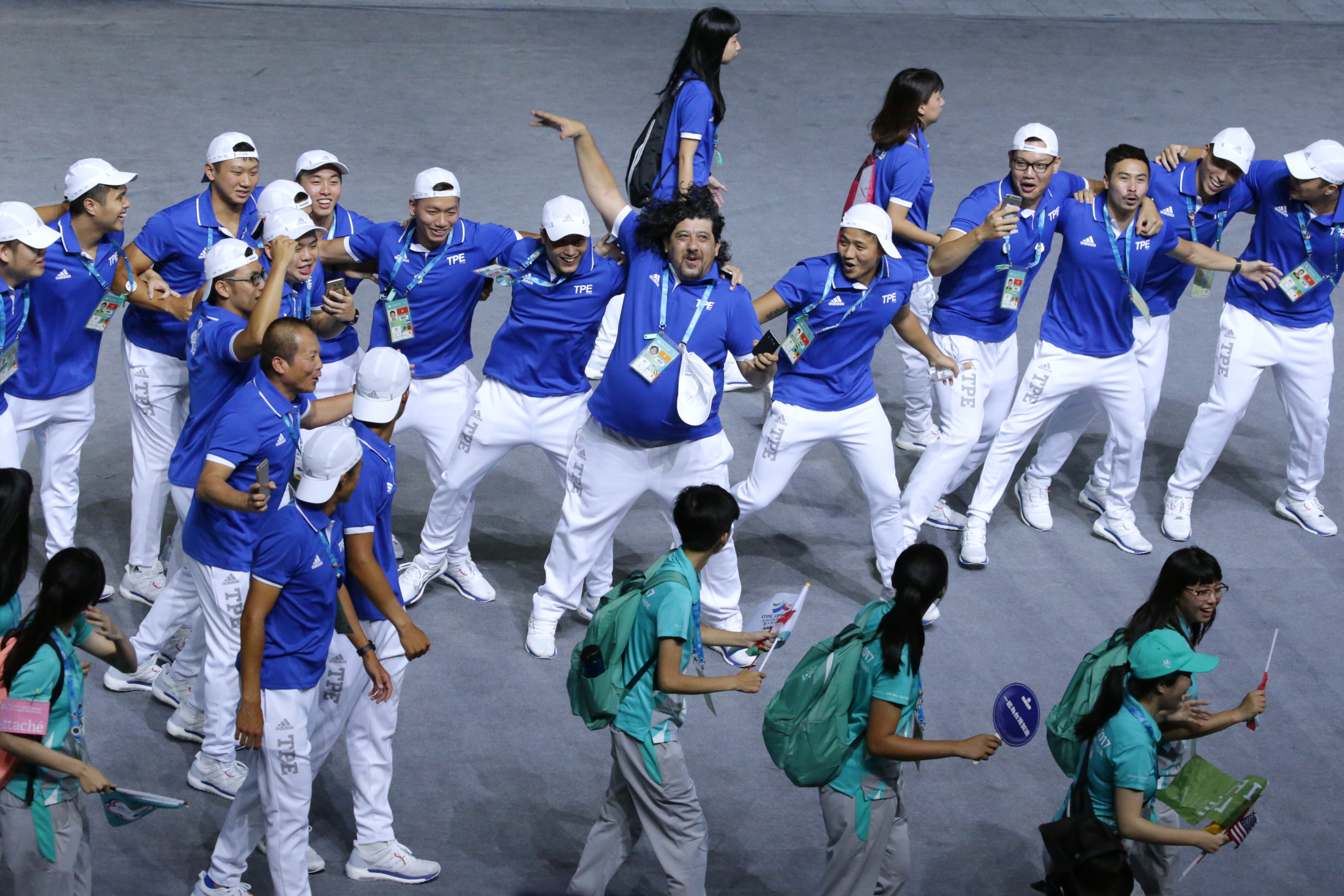
Chinese Taipei athletes in the Opening Ceremony.

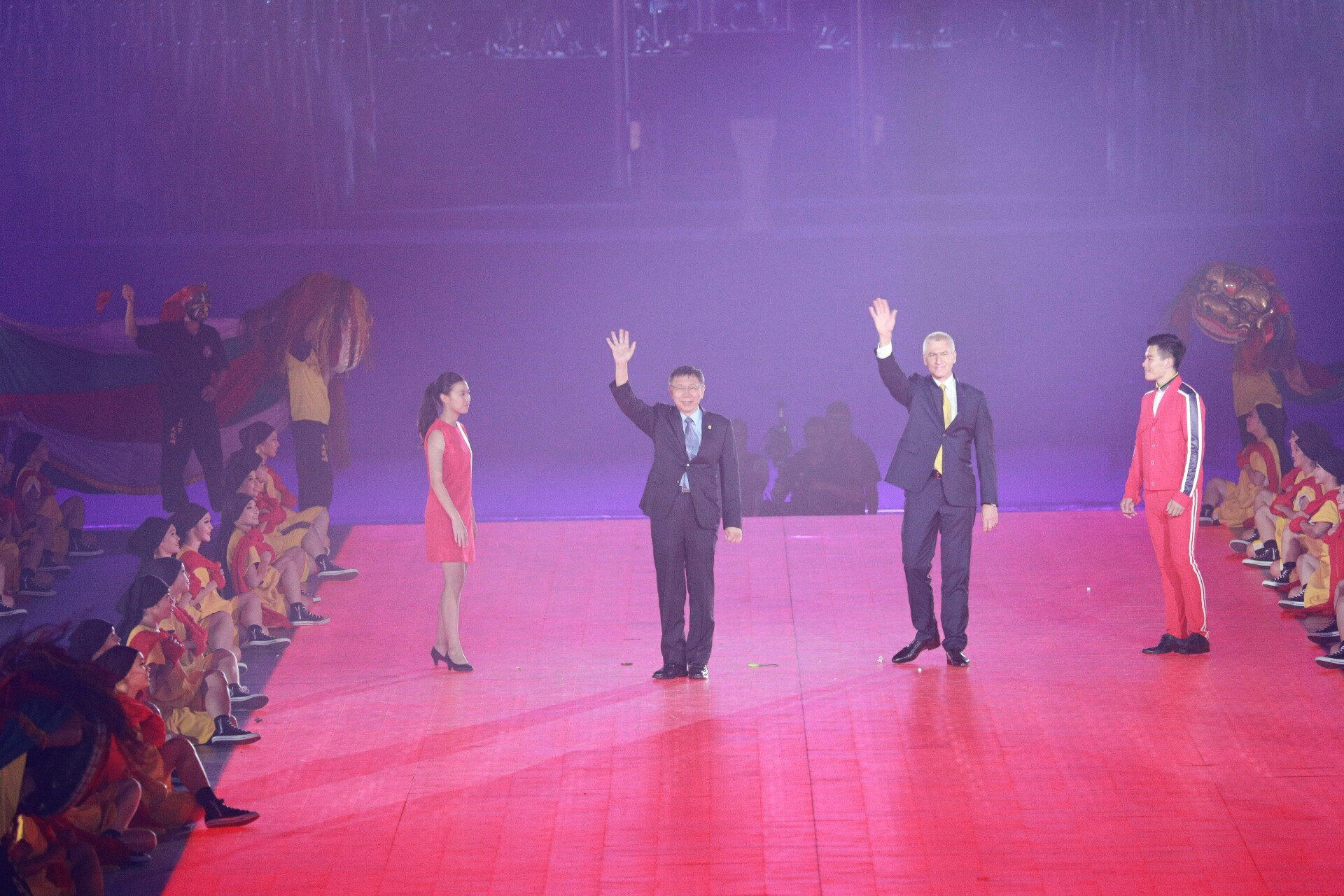
Ko Wen-je, the mayor of Taipei, together with Oleg Matytsin, President of the International University Sports Federation (FISU).

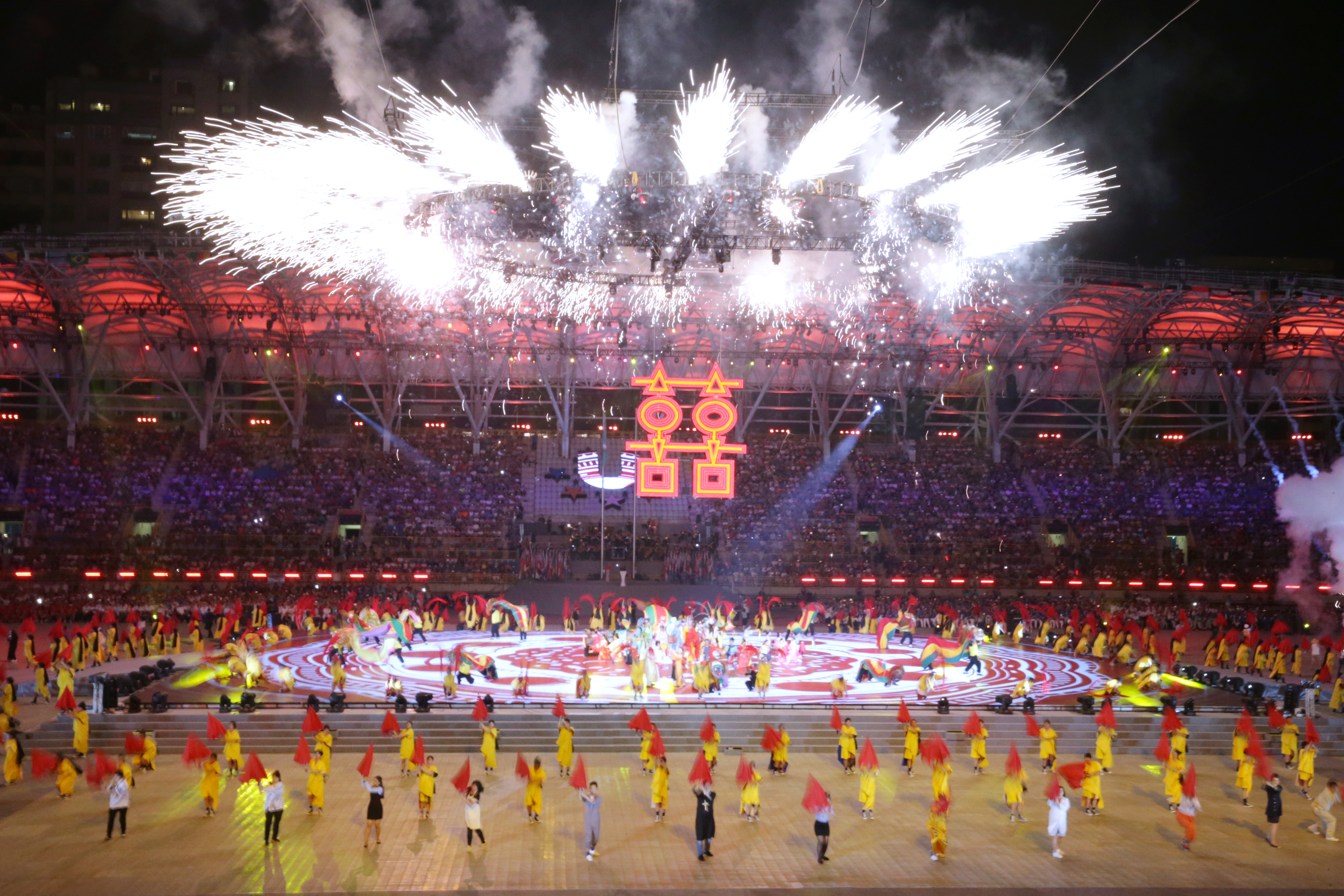
Performances in the Opening ceremony of the 2017 Summer Universiade.

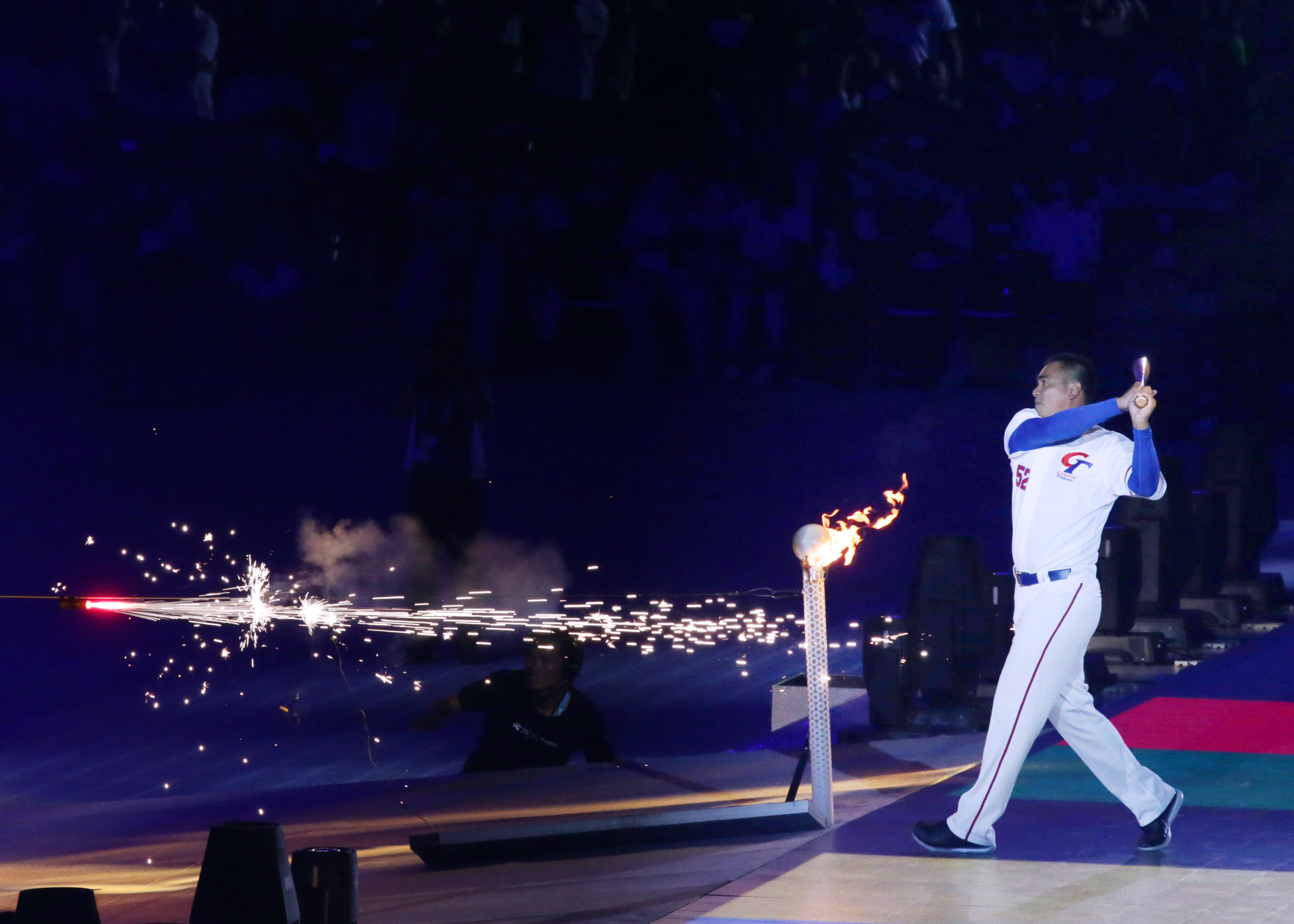
Chen Chin-Feng on 2017 Summer Universiade, lighting the flame.

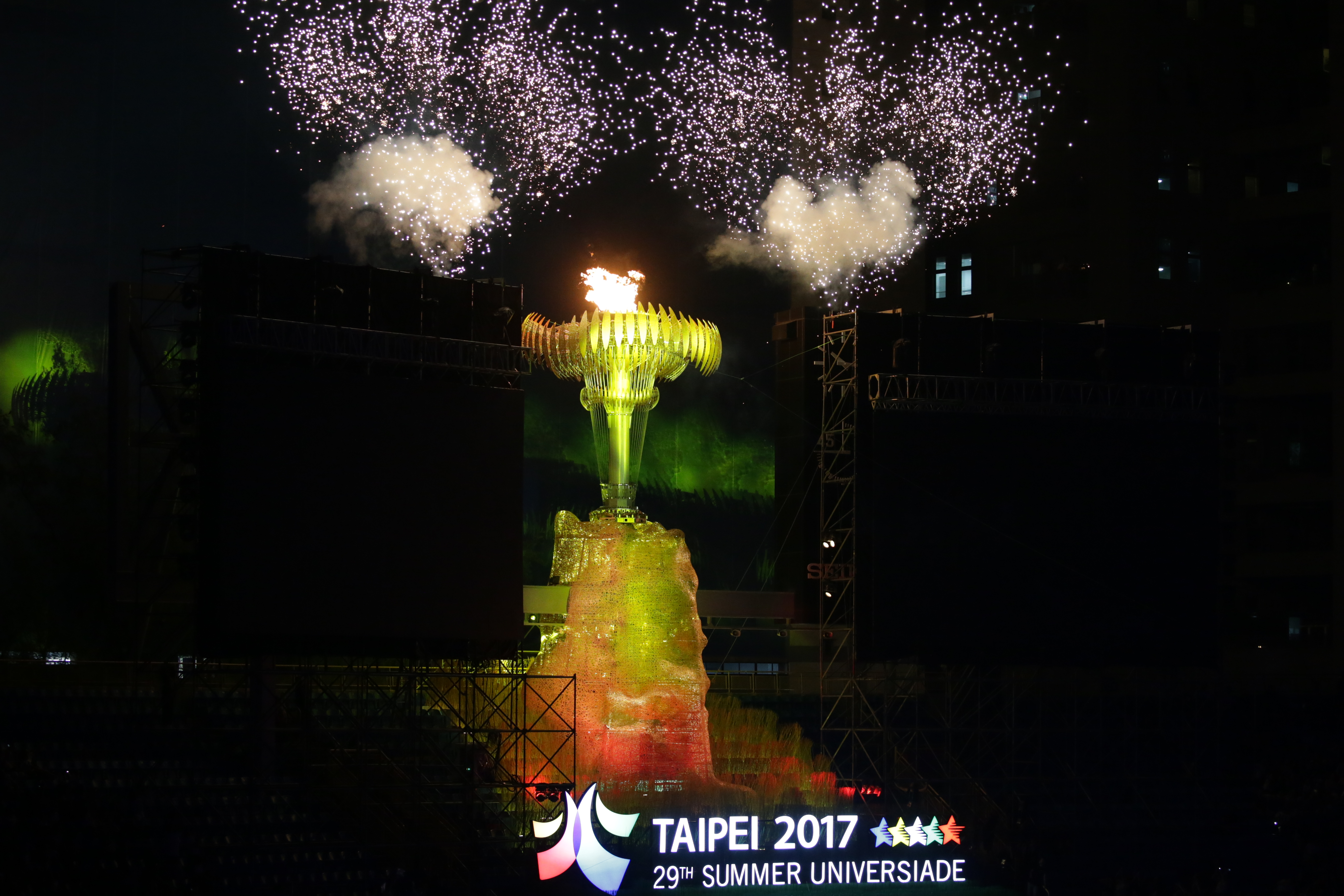
Flame of the 2017 Summer Universiade.

=== Closing ceremony ===
The closing ceremony started at 6:30pm on 30 August with "Indie Formosa", a 10 song performance influenced by the cultures of Hakka, Taiwanese and other aboriginal cultures from the area. Other performances included a mix of contemporary Taiwanese and international music in dance performances. At the end of the ceremony, the FISU flag was lowered and handed over to the representatives of Naples, Italy, the host of the next Summer Universiade, in 2019.

During the closing ceremony, athletes from Argentina, Brazil, Canada, Denmark, Dominican Republic and the United Kingdom thanked Taiwan by carrying banners, Republic of China flags and wigs with the colours of the ROC flag. After the closing ceremony, athletes of these countries received an official warning by FISU for bringing flags of the Republic of China into the stadium as they marched in the parade of nations in the closing ceremony.

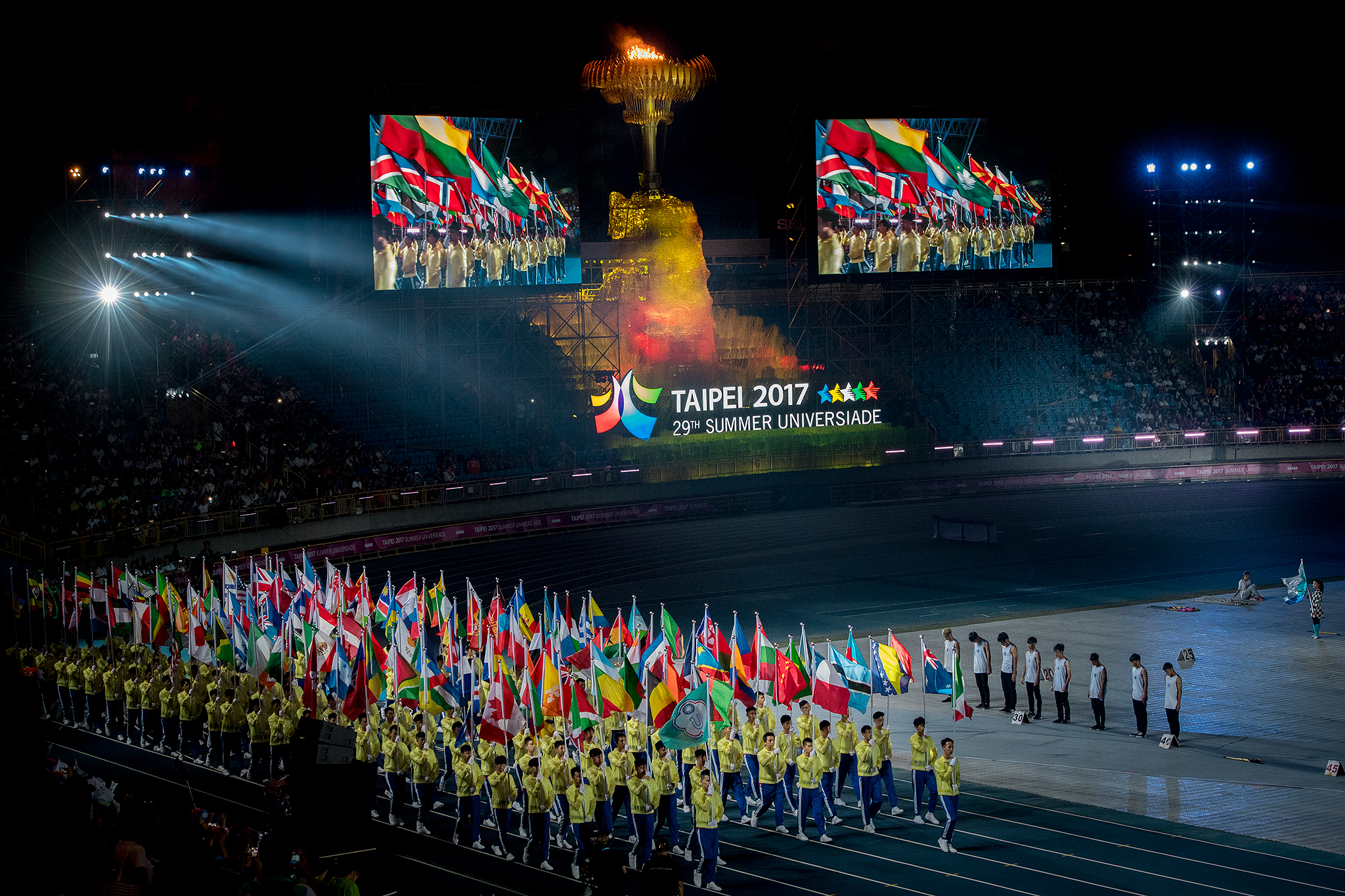
Closing ceremony of the 2017 Summer Universiade.

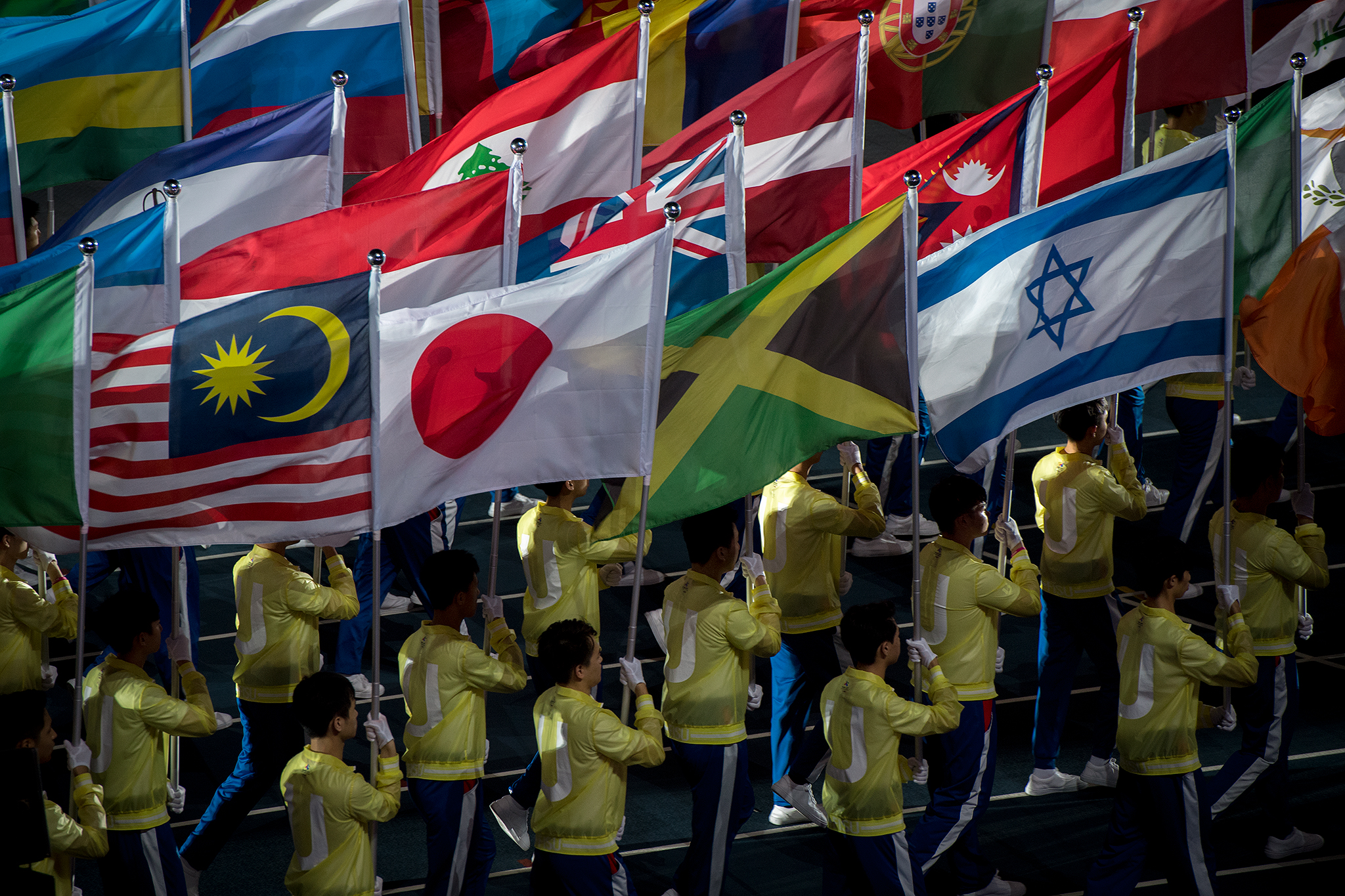
Flags of different countries in the closing ceremony.

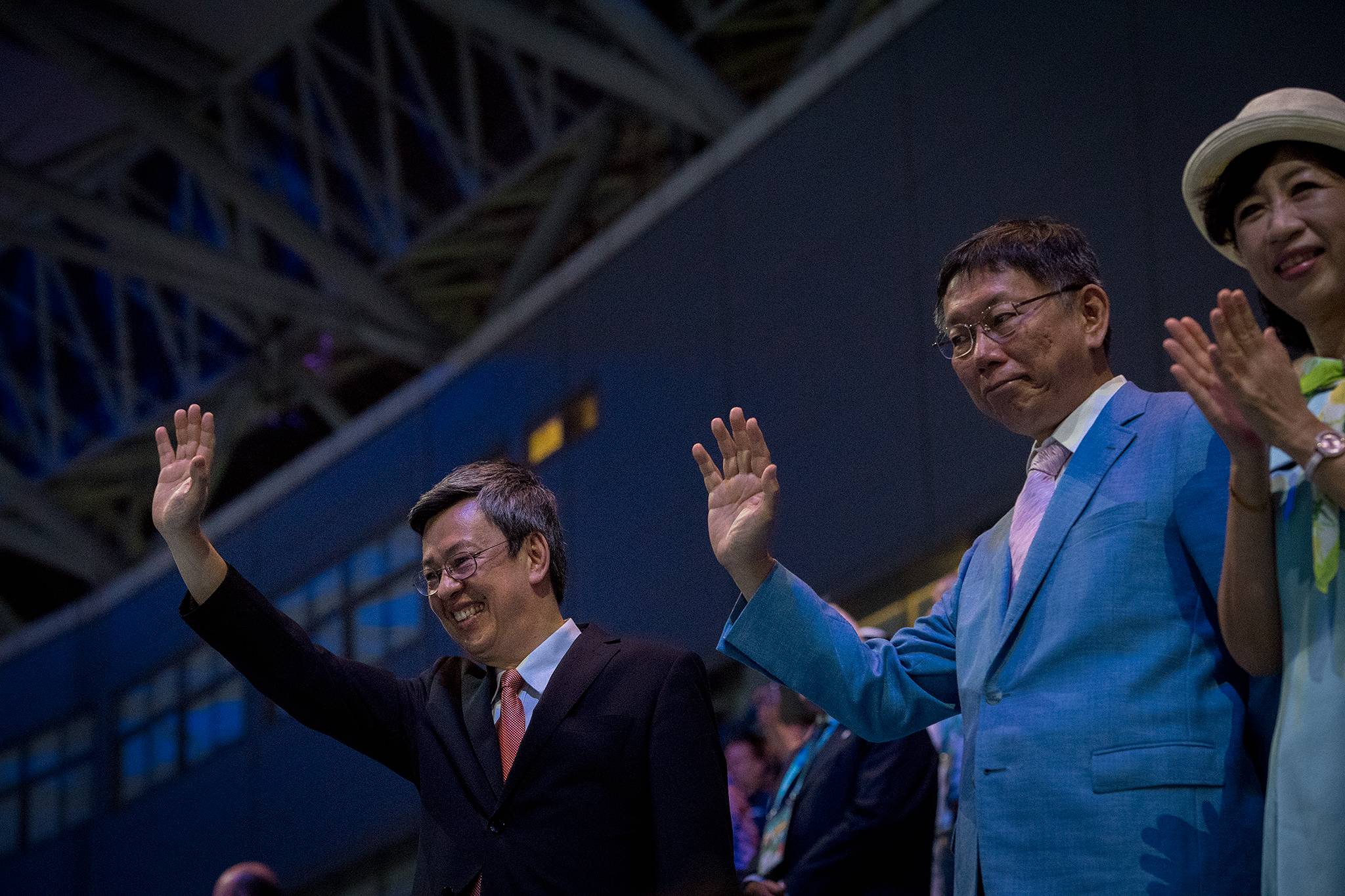
Vice President Chen Chien-jen with Ko Wen-je in the closing ceremony.

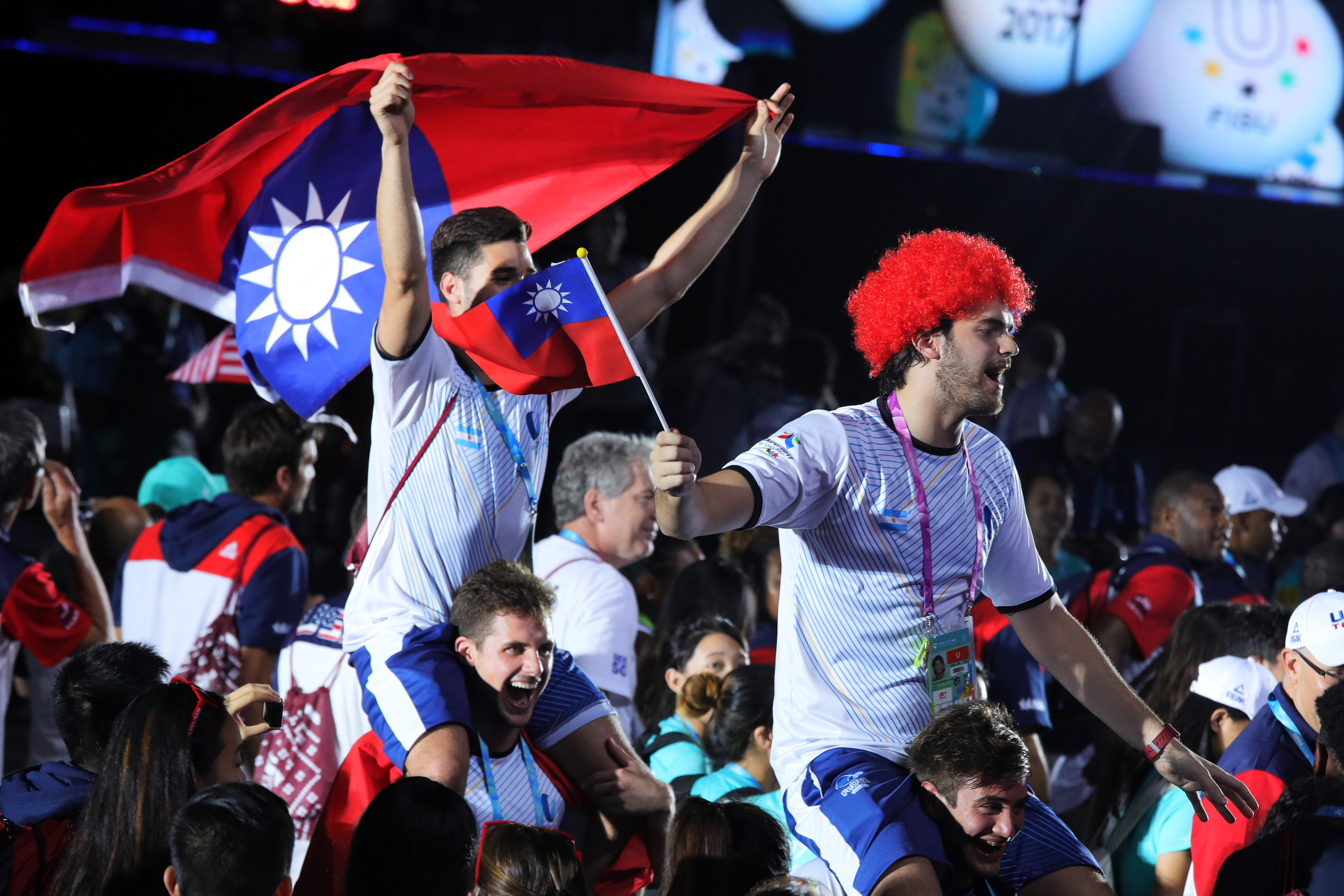
Argentinian athletes in the closing ceremony, with flags of the Republic of China.

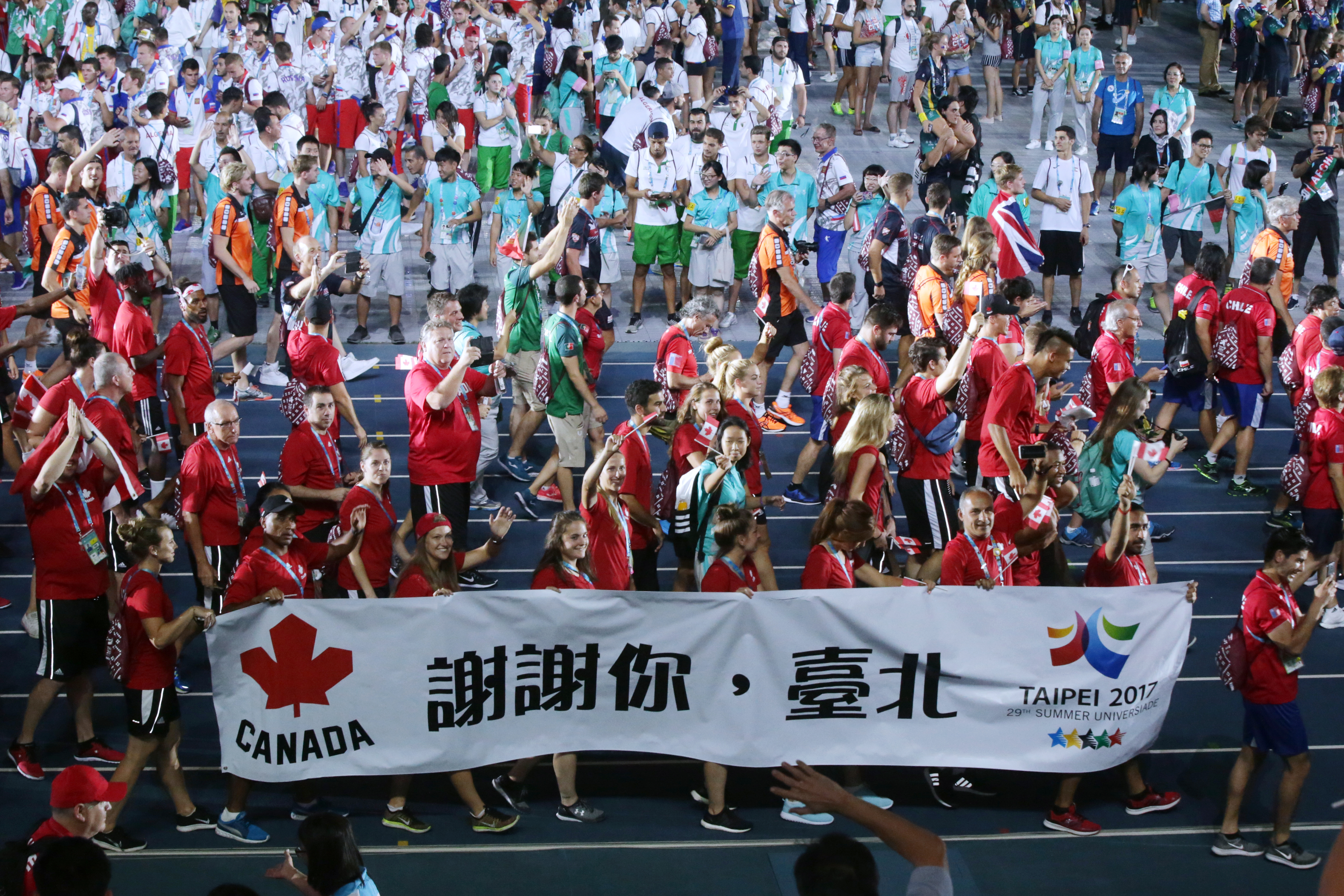
Canadian athletes in the closing ceremony with a banner that says "Thank you, Taipei" in Chinese.

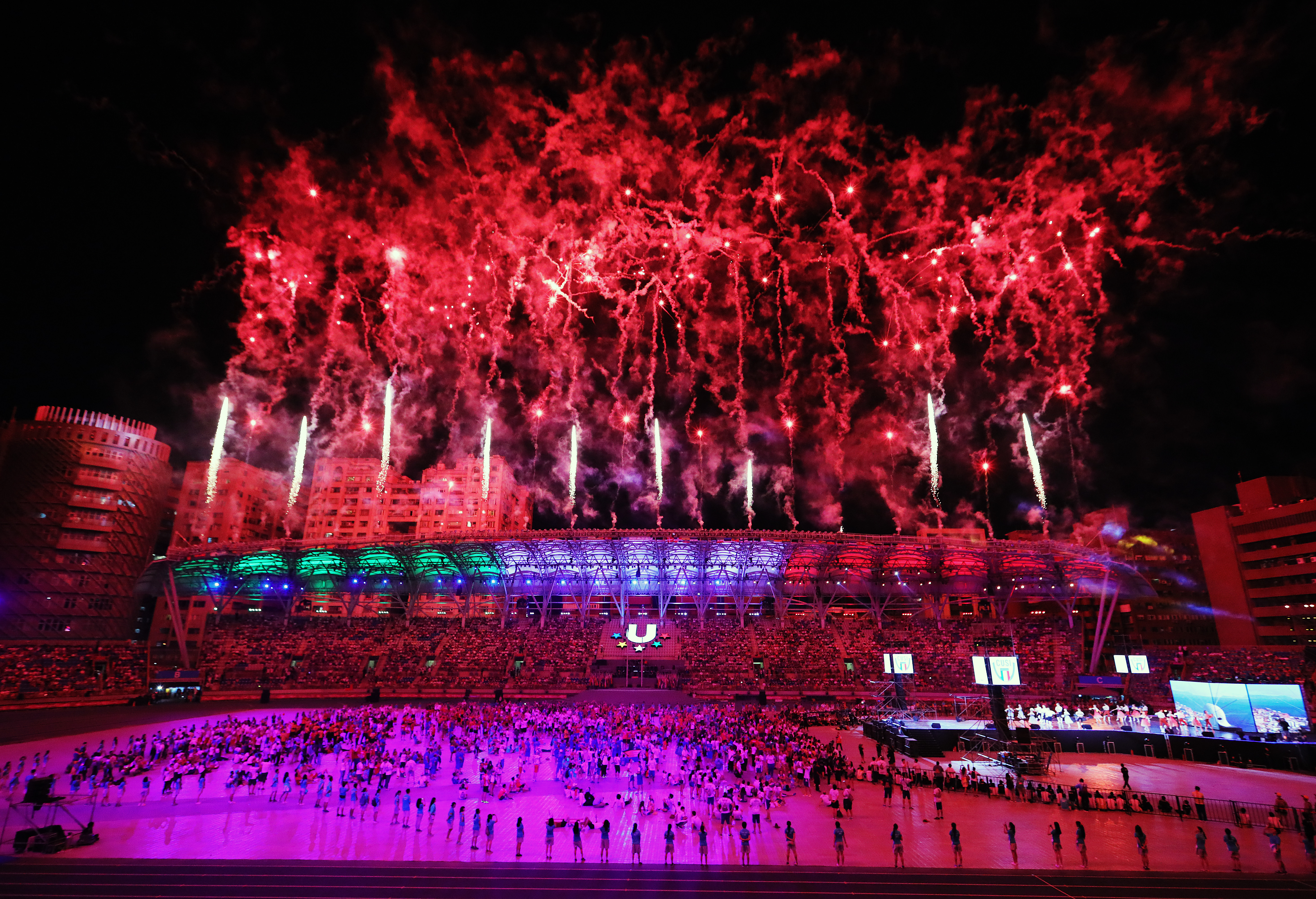
Fireworks in the closing ceremony.

== See also ==
- List of sporting events in Taiwan
