= Sierra Leone at the 2017 Summer Universiade =

- IOC code: SLE
- NOC: National Olympic Committee of Sierra Leone

in Taipei, Taiwan 19 – 30 August 2017
- Competitors: 6 in 1 sport
- Medals: Gold 0 Silver 0 Bronze 0 Total 0

Summer Universiade appearances
- 1959; 1961; 1963; 1965; 1967; 1970; 1973; 1975; 1977; 1979; 1981; 1983; 1985; 1987; 1989; 1991; 1993; 1995; 1997; 1999; 2001; 2003; 2005; 2007; 2009; 2011; 2013; 2015; 2017; 2019; 2021

The Republic of Sierra Leone entered six athletes, four men and two women, to compete at the 2017 Summer Universiade in Taipei, Taiwan. Out of the six, four of them did not start, and only two actually competed, but neither of them won a medal.

== Athletics ==
Sierra Leone had six athletes scheduled to compete, but only two actually participated. Mariama Kamara in the women's 800 metres event, placing 26th, and Mohamed Othman in the men's 100 metres event, who placed 60th.
