= Belgium at the 2017 Summer Universiade =

- IOC code: BEL
- NOC: Belgian Olympic Committee

in Taipei, Taiwan 19 – 30 August 2017
- Competitors: 30 in 10 sports
- Medals Ranked 62nd: Gold 0 Silver 0 Bronze 1 Total 1

Summer Universiade appearances
- 1959; 1961; 1963; 1965; 1967; 1970; 1973; 1975; 1977; 1979; 1981; 1983; 1985; 1987; 1989; 1991; 1993; 1995; 1997; 1999; 2001; 2003; 2005; 2007; 2009; 2011; 2013; 2015; 2017; 2019; 2021; 2025; 2027

Belgium participated at the 2017 Summer Universiade in Taipei, Taiwan with 30 competitors in 10 sports.

== Competitors ==
The following table lists Belgium's delegation per sport and gender.

Sport	Men	Women	Total
Archery	0	1	1
Athletics	5	5	10
Badminton	0	1	1
Fencing	2	0	2
Artistic gymnastics	1	1	2
Judo	3	3	6
Swimming	1	1	2
Table tennis	3	0	3
Taekwondo	2	0	2
Weightlifting	0	1	1
Total	17	13	30

== Medalists ==
Medals by sport
Sport	1st place, gold medalist(s)	2nd place, silver medalist(s)	3rd place, bronze medalist(s)	Total
Athletics	0	0	1	1
Total	0	1	0	1

== Archery ==
Athlete	Event	Ranking round		Round of 48	Round of 32	Round of 16	Quarterfinals	Semifinals	Final / BM	
Athlete	Event	Score	Seed	Opposition Score	Opposition Score	Opposition Score	Opposition Score	Opposition Score	Opposition Score	Rank
Sarah Prieels	Women's Compound Individual	682	8	Bye	Tze Chieh Conte Loh (SGP); W 144-134	Fereshteh Ghorbani (IRI); W 143-141	Chaewon So (BEL); L 141-146	did not advance		7

== Athletics ==
=== Men ===
==== Track Events ====
Athlete	Event	Round 1		Round 2		Semifinal		Final	
Athlete	Event	Result	Rank	Result	Rank	Result	Rank	Result	Rank
Aaron Ivan G Botterman	800m	1:52.38	1Q	—		1:49.45	6	did not advance	
Pieter Claus	1500m	3:50.97	5	—				did not advance	
Thomas De Bock	Half Marathon	—						DNF	—
Simon Debognies	5000m	14:28.54	6q	—				14:05:39	5

==== Field Events ====
Athlete	Event	Qualification		Final	
Athlete	Event	Distance	Position	Distance	Position
Corentin Franco Campener	Long Jump	7.11	18	Did Not Advance	

=== Women ===
==== Track Events ====
Athlete	Event	Round 1		Round 2		Semifinal		Final	
Athlete	Event	Result	Rank	Result	Rank	Result	Rank	Result	Rank
Cynthia Bolingo Mbongo	200m	24.23	4Q	—		24.80	8	did not advance	
Margo Van Puyvelde	400m Hurdles	57.81	2q	—				58.47	7

==== Field Events ====
Athlete	Event	Qualification		Final	
Athlete	Event	Distance	Position	Distance	Position
Aurelie De Ryck	Pole Vault	4.00	5Q	4.10	11
Elien De Vocht	Pole Vault	3.90	7q	4.00	12

==== Combined Events ====
Heptathlon

Athlete	Event	100H	HJ	SP	200 m	LJ	JT	800 m	Final	Rank
Noor Vidts	Result	14.27	1.74	12.68	25.13	6.20	31.37	2:15.37	5728	3rd place, bronze medalist(s)
Noor Vidts	Points	941	903	706	875	912	503	888	5728	3rd place, bronze medalist(s)

== Badminton ==
Athlete	Event	Round of 128	Round of 64	Round of 32	Round of 16	Quarterfinal	Semifinal	Final / BM	
Athlete	Event	Opposition Score	Opposition Score	Opposition Score	Opposition Score	Opposition Score	Opposition Score	Opposition Score	Rank
Lianne Tan	Women's Singles	Bye	Amita Giri (NEP); W 2-0	Zin Yee Cheryl Chung (HKG); W 2-0	Nuntakarn Aimsaard (THA); W 2-1	Tzu-Ying Tai (TPE); L 0-2	Did Not Advance		5

== Fencing ==
Athlete	Event	Round of 128	Round of 64	Round of 32	Round of 16	Quarterfinal	Semifinal	Final / BM	
Athlete	Event	Opposition Score	Opposition Score	Opposition Score	Opposition Score	Opposition Score	Opposition Score	Opposition Score	Rank
Stef De Greef	Men's Foil Individual	Bye	Jose Charreu (POR); W 15-10	Maxime Pauty (FRA); L 10-15	did not advance				25
Nicolas Poncin	Men's Epee Individual	Flavio Giannotte (LUX); W 15-14	Lukas Bellmann (GER); L 9-15	did not advance					63

== Gymnastics ==
=== Artistic ===
==== Men ====
Athlete	Event	Apparatus						Total	Rank
Athlete	Event	F	PH	R	V	PB	HB	Total	Rank
Maxime Gentges	All-Around	13.400	13.300	13.600	13.100	13.500	11.900	78.800	—

==== Women ====
Athlete	Event	Apparatus				Total	Rank
Athlete	Event	V	UB	BB	F	Total	Rank
Dorien Eva Motten	All-Around	13.500	12.950	11.250	12.900	50.600	12
Dorien Eva Motten	Vault	13.183	—			13.183	7

== Judo ==
Athlete	Event	Round of 64	Round of 32	Round of 16	Quarterfinals	Repechage 32	Repechage 16	Repechage 8	Final Repechage	Semifinals	Final / BM	
Athlete	Event	Opposition Result	Opposition Result	Opposition Result	Opposition Result	Opposition Result	Opposition Result	Opposition Result	Opposition Result	Opposition Result	Opposition Result	Rank
Rita C Evelien Cappaert	Women's -52 kg	—	Kachakorn Warasiha (THA); L 00S1–10	did not advance								—
Denis Gabriel E Caro-Lognoul	Men's -73 kg	Bye	Bekadil Shaimerdenov (KAZ); L 00–02S1	did not advance								—
Flavio Dimarca	Men's -60 kg	—	Daniel Santos Almonte (DOM); W 02S1–00	Baiaman Sagynbai Uulu (KGZ); W 03S2–01	Rustam Ibrayev (KAZ); L 00–01S1	—	Bye	Roy Koffijberg (NED); W 02S2–01	Albert Oguzov (RUS); L 00–10	did not advance		7
Mazine Heyns	Women's -63 kg	—	Valentina Kostenko (RUS); L 00–11S1	Bye			Iris Iwema (NED); L 00–10	did not advance				—
Anne Sophie Jura	Women's -48 kg	—	Sara Matijevic (CRO); W 12–00	Marine Jessica Lhenry (NED); L 00–01	did not advance							—
Dylan Van Nuffel	Men's -100 kg	—	Habib Salvador Baduy (ARG); W 10–01	Niiaz Bilalov (RUS); L 00–10	Bye			Danylo Hutsol (UKR); W 01–00S1	Philipp Galandi (GER); L 00S1–02S1	did not advance		7

== Swimming ==
Athlete	Event	Heat		Semifinal		Final	
Athlete	Event	Time	Rank	Time	Rank	Time	Rank
Thomas Dal	Men's 200m Individual Medley	2:09.80	8	did not advance			
Thomas Dal	Men's 400m Individual Medley	4:27.14	4	did not advance			
Lise Fanny Michels	Women's 100m Breaststroke	1:11.79	7	did not advance			
Lise Fanny Michels	Women's 200m Breaststroke	2:36.15	7	did not advance			

== Table Tennis ==
Athlete	Event	Group Stage			Round of 128	Round of 64	Round of 32	Round of 16	Quarterfinals	Semifinals	Final / BM	
Athlete	Event	Opposition Result	Opposition Result	Opposition Result	Opposition Result	Opposition Result	Opposition Result	Opposition Result	Opposition Result	Opposition Result	Opposition Result	Rank
Thibaut Philipp Darcis	Men's Singles	Michal Benes (CZE); W 3-2	Willhelm Percan Kindblad (SWE); W 3-1	—		Chien-An Chen (TPE); L 0-4	Did Not Advance					
Jasper Merckx	Men's Singles	Roger Rao (AUS); L 2-3	Kert Raeis (EST); W 3-0	—		Did Not Advance						
Gaetan F. Swartenbrouckx	Men's Singles	Jorge Luis Flores Andara (HON); W 3-0	Bekulan Zhamal (KAZ); W 3-2	—		Pavol Mego (SVK); W 4-1	Cheng-Ting Liao (TPE); L 0-4	did not advance				
Darcis/Swartenbrouckx	Men's Doubles	—				Joshi/Rai (NEP); W 3-1	Ma/Wang (NZL); L 2-3	did not advance				

== Taekwondo ==
Athlete	Event	Round of 64	Round of 32	Round of 16	Quarterfinals	Semifinals	Final / BM	
Athlete	Event	Opposition Result	Opposition Result	Opposition Result	Opposition Result	Opposition Result	Opposition Result	Rank
Si Mohamed Ketbi	Men's -68 kg	Bye	Aleh Satsyk (BLR); W 16-5	Dongyun Shin (KOR); L 9-15	Did Not Advance			9
Mourad Abdel Ma Laarchraoui	Men's -58 kg	Bye	Shane Alexander Britton (CAN); W 14-8	Marat Niiazov (KGZ); W 25-10	Gulzhigit Kochkorbaev (RUS); L 2-4	did not advance		5

== Weightlifting ==
Athlete	Event	Snatch		Clean & Jerk		Total	Rank
Athlete	Event	Result	Rank	Result	Rank	Total	Rank
Anna Van Bellinghen	Women's 90 kg	106	3	121	5	227	5
