= Diving at the 2017 Summer Universiade – Men's 1 metre springboard =

Men's 1 metre springboard at the Universiade
- Venue: University of Taipei (Tianmu) Shin-hsin Hall B1 Diving Pool
- Dates: 21 August 2017
- Competitors: 29 from 16 nations

Medalists
1st place, gold medalist(s)		Kim Yeong-nam	South Korea
2nd place, silver medalist(s)		Briadam Herrera	United States
3rd place, bronze medalist(s)		Evgenii Kuznetsov	Russia

The men's 1 metre springboard diving event at the 2017 Summer Universiade was contested on August 21 at the University of Taipei (Tianmu) Shin-hsin Hall B1 Diving Pool in Taipei, Taiwan.

== Schedule ==
All times are Taiwan Standard Time (UTC+08:00)

Date	Time	Event
Monday, 21 August 2017	10:00	Preliminary
Monday, 21 August 2017	13:00	Semifinals Group A
Monday, 21 August 2017	13:35	Semifinals Group B
Monday, 21 August 2017	14:45	Final

== Results ==
Qualified for the final
Qualified for the semifinal

=== Preliminary ===
Rank	Athlete	Dive						Total
Rank	Athlete	1	2	3	4	5	6	Total
1	Evgeny Kuznetsov (RUS)	63.55	66.00	70.40	58.50	76.50	66.00	400.95
2	Briadam Herrera (USA)	63.00	62.40	64.35	70.40	66.30	72.00	398.45
3	Oleg Kolodiy (UKR)	69.75	64.35	63.00	58.50	73.60	56.55	385.75
4	Kim Yeong-nam (KOR)	44.20	64.35	67.20	67.50	72.00	60.00	375.25
5	Nikita Shleikher (RUS)	62.00	57.00	63.00	63.00	67.20	63.00	375.20
6	Giovanni Tocci (ITA)	59.80	60.80	61.50	58.50	64.50	65.10	370.20
7	Jahir Ocampo (MEX)	51.00	69.75	67.50	58.50	67.20	55.50	369.45
8	Woo Ha-ram (KOR)	65.10	64.50	64.00	43.50	64.50	60.00	361.60
9	Lars Ruediger (GER)	66.65	67.20	66.00	48.00	54.00	58.50	360.35
10	Aleksandr Bondar (RUS)	62.40	66.65	67.50	40.50	58.50	59.45	355.00
11	Nico Rene Herzog (GER)	55.80	55.90	66.00	45.50	63.00	67.20	354.40
12	Rodrigo Diego (MEX)	54.60	54.00	57.00	58.50	60.80	65.10	350.00
13	Lorenzo Marsaglia (ITA)	65.10	63.00	57.60	54.00	54.00	54.00	347.70
14	Andrzej Rzeszutek (POL)	62.35	47.60	60.00	55.50	54.00	60.80	340.25
15	Haruki Suyama (JPN)	55.80	46.50	57.60	55.50	61.50	61.50	338.40
16	Adan Emidio Zuniga (MEX)	63.00	63.00	65.10	44.85	48.60	52.50	337.05
17	Peter Thach Mai (CAN)	54.60	57.00	54.00	54.00	50.40	65.10	335.10
18	Joseph Michael Cifelli (USA)	54.00	64.50	39.00	61.50	55.80	57.60	332.40
19	Frithjof Seidel (GER)	52.20	43.50	59.20	48.30	62.00	64.35	329.55
20	Stanislav Oliferchyk (UKR)	55.80	52.50	49.50	58.50	53.65	57.60	327.55
21	Christopher Joseph Law (USA)	40.50	54.00	57.35	51.20	51.15	51.00	305.20
22	Jackson Rondinelli (BRA)	37.95	51.60	52.50	54.60	42.00	62.00	300.65
23	Jack Anthony Ffrench (IRL)	45.00	49.40	55.50	54.00	45.00	48.05	296.95
24	Kacper Jakub Lesiak (POL)	54.25	51.00	49.50	54.00	50.70	36.80	296.25
25	Jonathan Alexan Suckow (SUI)	35.65	45.00	48.30	36.00	64.50	57.60	287.05
26	Rim Kum-song (PRK)	48.00	52.00	54.25	45.00	36.80	50.00	286.05
27	Simon Baptiste Rieckhoff (SUI)	54.60	36.00	55.80	44.85	36.40	36.00	263.65
28	Juraj Melša (CRO)	48.75	41.60	46.50	40.50	49.50	0.00	226.85
29	Lin Yun-di (TPE)	20.00	16.15	40.80	28.05	48.10	35.70	188.80

=== Semifinals ===
==== Group A ====
Rank	Athlete	Dive						Total
Rank	Athlete	1	2	3	4	5	6	Total
1	Woo Ha-ram (KOR)	74.40	58.50	70.40	58.50	72.00	61.50	395.30
2	Kim Yeong-nam (KOR)	79.90	44.55	75.20	49.50	67.20	72.00	388.35
3	Giovanni Tocci (ITA)	59.80	68.80	63.00	63.00	61.50	66.65	382.75
4	Lorenzo Marsaglia (ITA)	65.10	60.00	67.20	61.50	58.50	60.00	372.30
5	Nico Rene Herzog (GER)	55.80	54.60	63.00	54.00	64.50	67.20	359.10

==== Group B ====
Rank	Athlete	Dive						Total
Rank	Athlete	1	2	3	4	5	6	Total
1	Jahir Ocampo (MEX)	63.00	74.40	63.00	76.50	76.80	66.00	419.70
2	Rodrigo Diego (MEX)	58.50	54.00	72.00	67.50	67.20	74.40	393.60
3	Oleg Kolodiy (UKR)	69.75	59.40	67.50	58.50	73.60	59.45	388.20
4	Nikita Shleikher (RUS)	69.75	54.00	64.50	66.00	72.00	45.00	371.25
5	Lars Ruediger (GER)	65.10	54.40	75.00	48.00	63.00	61.50	367.00

=== Final ===
Rank	Athlete	Dive						Total
Rank	Athlete	1	2	3	4	5	6	Total
1st place, gold medalist(s)	Kim Yeong-nam (KOR)	81.60	69.30	76.80	76.50	76.80	72.00	453.00
2nd place, silver medalist(s)	Briadam Herrera (USA)	72.00	76.80	84.15	72.00	66.30	78.00	449.25
3rd place, bronze medalist(s)	Evgeny Kuznetsov (RUS)	71.30	76.50	70.40	72.00	72.00	72.00	434.20
4	Woo Ha-ram (KOR)	69.75	67.50	75.20	72.00	72.00	67.50	423.95
5	Jahir Ocampo (MEX)	61.50	77.50	76.50	51.00	72.00	72.00	410.50
6	Giovanni Tocci (ITA)	63.70	70.40	40.50	75.00	73.50	79.05	402.15
7	Oleg Kolodiy (UKR)	74.40	70.95	67.50	40.50	76.60	60.90	391.05
8	Rodrigo Diego (MEX)	55.90	51.00	69.00	67.50	67.20	74.40	385.00
