= Swimming at the 2017 Summer Universiade – Women's 800 metre freestyle =

Women's 800 metre freestyle at the 2017 Summer Universiade
- Venue: National Taiwan Sport University Arena
- Location: Taipei, Taiwan
- Dates: 24 August (heats); 25 August (final)
- Competitors: 26 from 20 nations
- Winning time: 8:20.54

Medalists
gold medal	Simona Quadarella	Italy
silver medal	Sarah Köhler	Germany
bronze medal	Joanna Evans	Bahamas

The Women's 800 metre freestyle competition at the 2017 Summer Universiade was held on 24 and 25 August 2017.

== Records ==
Prior to the competition, the existing world and Universiade records were as follows.

World record	Katie Ledecky (USA)	8:04.79	Rio de Janeiro, Brazil	12 August 2016
Competition record	Flavia Rigamonti (SUI)	8:25.59	Bangkok, Thailand	9 August 2007

The following new records were set during this competition.

Date	Event	Name	Nationality	Time	Record
25 August	Final	Simona Quadarella	Italy	8:20.54	UR

== Results ==
=== Heats ===
The heats were held on 24 August at 10:25.

Rank	Heat	Lane	Name	Nationality	Time	Notes
1	4	4	Sarah Köhler	Germany	8:32.08	Q
2	4	5	Hannah Moore	United States	8:33.00	Q
3	4	2	Camilla Hattersley	Great Britain	8:35.19	Q
4	3	4	Simona Quadarella	Italy	8:35.70	Q
5	3	3	Julia Hassler	Liechtenstein	8:36.01	Q
6	3	6	Kiah Melverton	Australia	8:36.21	Q
7	4	3	Joanna Evans	Bahamas	8:36.89	Q
8	4	6	Kaersten Meitz	United States	8:37.54	Q
9	3	5	Yukimi Moriyama	Japan	8:37.98	
10	3	7	Mayuko Goto	Japan	8:38.54	
11	4	7	Kareena Lee	Australia	8:44.74	
12	4	8	Choi Jung-min	South Korea	8:46.45	
13	4	1	Alice Dearing	Great Britain	8:47.19	
14	2	3	Milena Karpisz	Poland	8:48.88	
15	3	2	Anna Egorova	Russia	8:51.79	
16	2	4	Danica Ludlow	Canada	8:55.06	
17	3	8	Justyna Burska	Poland	8:56.42	
18	2	5	Tereza Závadová	Czech Republic	8:58.42	
19	3	1	Valeriya Salamatina	Russia	9:00.25	
20	1	4	Olivia Carrizo	Argentina	9:14.73	
21	2	6	Tseng Chieh-chuan	Chinese Taipei	9:16.22	
22	2	7	Sasha-Lee Nordengen-Corris	South Africa	9:26.59	
23	2	1	Chrystelle Doueihy	Lebanon	9:26.68	
24	2	2	Laura Abril Lizarazo	Bolivia	9:31.18	
25	1	5	Sara Moualfi	Algeria	9:38.02	
26	1	3	Alliah Saliendra	Philippines	12:51.82	

=== Final ===
The final was held on 25 August at 19:02.

Rank	Lane	Name	Nationality	Time	Notes
1st place, gold medalist(s)	6	Simona Quadarella	Italy	8:20.54	UR
2nd place, silver medalist(s)	4	Sarah Köhler	Germany	8:21.67	
3rd place, bronze medalist(s)	1	Joanna Evans	Bahamas	8:31.18	NR
4	7	Kiah Melverton	Australia	8:32.46	
5	3	Camilla Hattersley	Great Britain	8:32.84	
6	2	Julia Hassler	Liechtenstein	8:32.86	NR
7	5	Hannah Moore	United States	8:36.64	
8	8	Kaersten Meitz	United States	8:40.30	
