= Diving at the 2017 Summer Universiade – Men's 3 metre springboard =

Men's 3 metre springboard at the Universiade
- Venue: University of Taipei (Tianmu) Shin-hsin Hall B1 Diving Pool
- Dates: 23–24 August 2017
- Competitors: 29 from 15 nations

Medalists
1st place, gold medalist(s)		Ilia Zakharov	Russia
2nd place, silver medalist(s)		Evgeny Kuznetsov	Russia
3rd place, bronze medalist(s)		Giovanni Tocci	Italy

The men's 3 metre springboard diving event at the 2017 Summer Universiade was contested from August 23 to 24 at the University of Taipei (Tianmu) Shin-hsin Hall B1 Diving Pool in Taipei, Taiwan.

== Schedule ==
All times are Taiwan Standard Time (UTC+08:00)

Date	Time	Event
Wednesday, 23 August 2017	10:00	Preliminary
Wednesday, 23 August 2017	13:00	Semifinals
Thursday, 24 August 2017	14:45	Final

== Results ==
Qualified for the next phase

=== Preliminary ===
Rank	Athlete	Dive						Total
Rank	Athlete	1	2	3	4	5	6	Total
1	Ilia Zakharov (RUS)	68.00	63.00	82.25	77.50	71.40	91.20	453.35
2	Jahir Ocampo (MEX)	69.70	81.60	69.00	78.75	74.25	77.90	451.20
3	Kim Yeong-nam (KOR)	66.00	71.40	69.30	76.50	83.60	56.00	422.80
4	Giovanni Tocci (ITA)	72.00	74.40	81.60	58.50	59.50	73.10	419.10
5	Woo Ha-ram (KOR)	57.80	71.40	96.90	84.00	54.00	52.65	416.75
6	Oleg Kolodiy (UKR)	81.60	75.00	64.35	68.25	74.10	52.70	453.85
7	Lars Ruediger (GER)	64.50	74.40	61.50	78.75	72.60	62.90	414.65
8	Haruki Suyama (JPN)	54.25	61.20	71.40	66.00	66.50	73.50	392.85
9	Andrzej Rzeszutek (POL)	66.65	68.00	68.00	71.75	48.00	68.25	390.65
10	Briadam Herrera (USA)	64.50	69.75	81.60	62.90	40.25	68.25	387.25
11	Evgeny Kuznetsov (RUS)	45.90	48.05	68.00	70.20	80.50	74.10	386.75
12	Tyler Robert Henschel (CAN)	68.00	72.00	56.10	54.00	59.50	65.10	374.70
13	Peter Thach Mai (CAN)	62.00	78.75	64.50	39.00	63.00	64.60	371.85
14	Dashiell Riley Enos (USA)	70.50	62.00	73.10	55.50	55.50	54.25	370.85
15	Adan Emidio Zuniga (MEX)	71.40	57.75	48.00	68.40	54.40	66.30	366.25
16	Julio Cesar Rodriguez (MEX)	63.55	54.00	64.50	47.60	68.25	68.00	365.90
17	Gabriele Auber (ITA)	62.00	66.30	63.00	58.50	54.00	61.50	365.30
18	Nikita Shleikher (RUS)	62.90	26.60	57.00	61.25	79.95	75.25	362.95
19	Mark Vann Anderson (USA)	65.10	71.75	67.50	56.00	40.80	56.10	357.25
20	Frithjof Seidel (GER)	55.50	54.00	54.00	62.90	59.50	65.10	351.00
21	Ian Matos (BRA)	61.50	63.00	54.45	63.00	65.10	39.10	346.15
22	Simon Baptiste Rieckhoff (SUI)	67.50	36.00	63.00	60.00	41.85	57.80	326.15
23	Juraj Melša (CRO)	54.00	57.00	40.30	60.00	58.50	46.40	316.20
24	Alexander Jan W Lube (GER)	57.00	57.00	52.70	33.00	52.70	61.25	313.65
25	Kacper Jakub Lesiak (POL)	49.50	63.55	54.00	40.50	63.00	42.50	313.05
26	Jonathan Alexan Suckow (SUI)	64.50	38.75	49.50	49.50	66.00	40.80	309.05
27	Jack Anthony Ffrench (IRL)	54.00	52.50	45.00	58.50	44.95	50.40	305.35
28	Stanislav Oliferchyk (UKR)	62.00	56.10	62.90	36.00	36.75	49.30	303.05
29	Leong Kam Cheong (MAC)	40.80	40.50	51.00	54.00	46.80	45.00	278.10

=== Semifinal ===
Rank	Athlete	Dive						Total
Rank	Athlete	1	2	3	4	5	6	Total
1	Ilia Zakharov (RUS)	76.50	75.60	75.25	79.05	79.90	93.10	479.40
2	Evgeny Kuznetsov (RUS)	78.20	65.10	76.50	73.80	78.75	89.30	461.65
3	Kim Yeong-nam (KOR)	70.50	78.20	72.60	81.60	77.90	68.25	449.05
4	Woo Ha-ram (KOR)	76.50	71.40	91.20	84.00	64.50	52.65	440.25
5	Oleg Kolodiy (UKR)	71.40	64.50	74.25	78.75	70.30	68.00	427.20
6	Giovanni Tocci (ITA)	72.00	74.40	83.30	66.00	63.00	64.60	423.30
7	Haruki Suyama (JPN)	66.65	68.00	71.40	66.00	73.50	73.50	419.05
8	Briadam Herrera (USA)	72.00	68.20	81.60	61.20	63.00	70.00	416.00
9	Jahir Ocampo (MEX)	76.50	78.20	70.50	49.00	74.25	57.00	405.45
10	Lars Ruediger (GER)	66.00	65.10	63.00	64.75	70.95	69.75	399.50
11	Andrzej Rzeszutek (POL)	69.75	76.50	59.50	73.50	45.00	71.75	396.00
12	Gabriele Auber (ITA)	65.10	66.30	73.50	54.00	66.00	63.00	387.90
13	Dashiell Riley Enos (USA)	66.00	63.55	71.40	61.50	42.00	71.75	376.20
14	Peter Thach Mai (CAN)	74.40	54.25	64.50	55.50	58.50	56.10	363.25
15	Tyler Robert Henschel (CAN)	66.30	64.50	37.40	63.00	52.50	72.85	356.55
16	Adan Emidio Zuniga (MEX)	44.20	35.00	58.50	76.00	64.60	70.20	348.50
17	Frithjof Seidel (GER)	63.00	54.00	51.00	66.30	56.10	54.25	344.65
18	Ian Matos (BRA)	64.50	51.00	29.70	58.50	51.15	37.40	292.25

=== Final ===
Rank	Athlete	Dive						Total
Rank	Athlete	1	2	3	4	5	6	Total
1st place, gold medalist(s)	Ilia Zakharov (RUS)	86.70	97.20	85.75	75.95	86.70	100.70	533.00
2nd place, silver medalist(s)	Evgeny Kuznetsov (RUS)	83.30	79.05	86.70	82.80	91.00	77.90	500.75
3rd place, bronze medalist(s)	Giovanni Tocci (ITA)	79.05	88.40	75.00	89.25	93.10	64.60	489.40
4	Oleg Kolodiy (UKR)	78.20	75.00	74.25	80.50	79.80	76.50	464.25
5	Woo Ha-ram (KOR)	83.30	64.60	72.20	89.25	70.50	74.10	453.95
6	Haruki Suyama (JPN)	69.75	74.80	74.80	63.00	87.50	84.00	453.85
7	Kim Yeong-nam (KOR)	72.00	78.20	74.25	76.50	68.40	84.00	453.35
8	Lars Ruediger (GER)	67.50	79.90	72.00	84.00	77.55	72.20	453.15
9	Briadam Herrera (USA)	72.00	77.50	81.60	66.30	73.50	73.50	444.40
10	Jahir Ocampo (MEX)	81.60	76.50	72.00	77.00	61.05	53.20	421.35
11	Gabriele Auber (ITA)	65.10	74.80	43.75	67.50	64.50	63.00	378.65
12	Andrzej Rzeszutek (POL)	60.45	76.50	64.60	56.00	58.50	61.25	377.30
