= Table tennis at the 2017 Summer Universiade – Men's team =

Men's team table tennis at the XXIX Summer Universiade
- Venue: Xinzhuang Gymnasium
- Date: 22–26 August 2017
- Competitors: 314 from 32 nations
- Teams: 32

Medalists
1st place, gold medalist(s)		Chen Xin; Kong Lingxuan; Lai Jiaxin; Yu Ziyang; Zhu Linfeng	China
2nd place, silver medalist(s)		Masataka Morizono; Yuya Oshima; Tonin Ryuzaki; Masaki Yoshida; Kazuhiro Yoshimura	Japan
3rd place, bronze medalist(s)		Chen Chien-an; Chiang Hung-chieh; Lee Chia-sheng; Liao Cheng-ting; Sun Chia-hung	Chinese Taipei
3rd place, bronze medalist(s)		An Jun-hee; Baek Kyung-jun; Jang Woo-jin; Kim Seok-ho; Lim Jong-hoon	South Korea

The men's team table tennis event was part of the table tennis programme and took place between August 22 and 26, at the Xinzhuang Gymnasium. Teams consisted of up to five members, but only three would compete in any given round. The thirty-two teams were divided into eight groups of four teams each, playing a round-robin within their pool. The top two teams in each pool advanced to the round of sixteen. The winner of each match progressed to the next round and the loser was knocked out. The winner of the finals won the gold medal, the loser won the silver medal, and the two losers of the semi-final matches both won bronze medals.

Each match consisted of up to five games, with the first team to win three being declared the winner. All matches were singles.

== Competition schedule ==
=== Tuesday, August 22, 2017 ===
Start time	Event	Round
12:00	Men's Team (Group 1, 2 and 3)	Group 1st Round
14:00	Men's Team (Group 4, 5, 6, 7 and 8)	Group 1st Round
18:00	Men's Team (Group 1, 2 and 3)	Group 2nd Round
20:00	Men's Team (Group 4, 5, 6, 7 and 8)	Group 2nd Round

=== Wednesday, August 23, 2017 ===
Start time	Event	Round
12:00	Men's Team (Group 1, 2 and 3)	Group 3rd Round
14:00	Men's Team (Group 4, 5, 6, 7 and 8)	Group 3rd Round
20:00	Men's Team	Round of Sixteen

=== Thursday, August 24, 2017 ===
Start time	Event	Round
19:00	Men's Team	Quarterfinals

=== Friday, August 25, 2017 ===
Start time	Event	Round
20:00	Men's Team	Semifinals

=== Saturday, August 26, 2017 ===
Start time	Event	Round
20:00	Men's Team	Finals

== Group round ==
=== Group 1 ===
Team	Pts	Pld	W	L	MW	ML
China (CHN)	6	3	3	0	9	2
Russia (RUS)	5	3	2	1	8	3
Argentina (ARG)	4	3	1	2	3	6
New Zealand (NZL)	3	3	0	3	0	9

August 22, 2017; 12:00	Argentina	0–3	China

Report	Individual matches
Horacio Cifuentes	0–3	Zhu Linfeng	7–11, 11–13, 2–11
Juan Manuel Daher	1–3	Chen Xin	7–11, 2–11, 14–12, 3–11
Javier Santiago Cillis	0–3	Kong Lingxuan	9–11, 3–11, 9–11

August 22, 2017; 12:00	New Zealand	0–3	Russia

Report	Individual matches
Dean Shu	0–3	Arseniy Gusev	3–11, 7–11, 10–12
Victor Zexin Zh Ma	1–3	Sadi Ismailov	5–11, 8–11, 11–9, 7–11
Roger Rao	0–3	Taras Merzlikin	4–11, 5–11, 2–11

August 22, 2017; 18:00	Russia	2–3	China

Report	Individual matches
Sadi Ismailov	3–1	Lingxuan Kong	3–11, 11–5, 11–9, 11–8
Vildan Gadiev	1–3	Linfeng Zhu	5–11, 11–3, 8–11, 8–11
Taras Merzlikin	3–2	Jiaxin Lai	7–11, 11–8, 8–11, 15–13, 11–8
Sadi Ismailov	1–3	Linfeng Zhu	1–11, 11–9, 8–11, 6–11
Vildan Gadiev	2–3	Kong Lingxuan	11–7, 3–11, 11–8, 12–14, 7–11

August 22, 2017; 18:00	New Zealand	0–3	Argentina

Report	Individual matches
Dean Shu	2–3	Juan Manuel Daher	3–11, 9–11, 11–4, 11–9, 6–11
Victor Zexin Zh Ma	1–3	Horacio Cifuentes	11–7, 4–11, 7–11, 5–11
Haikun Wang	0–3	Javier Santiago Cillis	4–11, 6–11, 8–11

August 23, 2017; 12:00	China	3–0	New Zealand

Report	Individual matches
Linfeng Zhu	3–0	Victor Zexin Zh Ma	11–2, 11–3, 11–3
Xin Chen	3–0	Dean Shu	11–6, 11–4, 11–7
Jiaxin Lai	3–1	Roger Rao	15–13, 11–9, 8–11, 11–6

August 23, 2017; 12:00	Argentina	0–3	Russia

Report	Individual matches
Horacio Cifuentes	0–3	Arseniy Gusev	7–11, 5–11, 3–11
Juan Manuel Daher	0–3	Sadi Ismailov	0–11, 3–11, 6–11
Javier Santiago Cillis	0–3	Taras Merzlikin	8–11, 8–11, 5–11

=== Group 2 ===
Team	Pts	Pld	W	L	MW	ML
Japan (JPN)	6	3	3	0	9	0
United States (USA)	5	3	2	1	6	5
Greece (GRE)	4	3	1	2	5	6
Oman (OMA)	3	3	0	3	0	9

August 22, 2017; 12:00	Japan	3–0	United States

Report	Individual matches
Yuya Oshima	3–0	Timothy Aaron Wang	11–6, 11–8, 11–3
Masaki Yoshida	3–2	Yijun Feng	11–4, 10–12, 11–3, 8–11, 11–9
Masataka Morizono	3–0	Billy Xu Ding	11–5, 11–2, 11–4

August 22, 2017; 12:00	Oman	0–3	Greece

Report	Individual matches
Al Khalil Ahmed Al Brashdi	0–3	Konstantinos Pa Konstantinopoulos	3–11, 5–11, 4–11
Haitham Humaid Al Mandhari	0–3	Giorgos Konstantinopoulos	3–11, 4–11, 1–11
Nasser Saif Nas Al Balushi	0–3	Ioannis Papadakis	5–11, 5–11, 6–11

August 22, 2017; 18:00	Japan	3–0	Greece

Report	Individual matches
Masaki Yoshida	3–0	Konstantinos Pa Konstantinopoulos	12–10, 11–8, 11–4
Yuya Oshima	3–0	Giorgos Konstantinopoulos	14–12, 11–5, 11–3
Kazuhiro Yoshimura	3–1	Ioannis Papadakis	9–11, 11–5, 11–2, 11–6

August 22, 2017; 18:00	United States	3–0	Oman

Report	Individual matches
Yijun Feng	3–0	Haitham Humaid Al Mandhari	11–7, 11–6, 11–3
Timothy Aaron Wang	3–0	Al Julanda Saif Al Kharusi	11–2, 11–2, 11–5
Nathan Hunter Hsu	3–0	Al Khalil Ahmed Al Brashdi	11–3, 11–1, 11–5

August 23, 2017; 12:00	Japan	3–0	Oman

Report	Individual matches
Masataka Morizono	3–0	Haitham Humaid Al Mandhari	11–3, 11–5, 11–2
Kazuhiro Yoshimura	3–0	Al Khalil Ahmed Al Brashdi	11–4, 11–5, 11–3
Tonin Ryuzaki	3–0	Nasser Saif Nas Al Balushi	11–4, 11–6, 11–4

August 23, 2017; 12:00	Greece	2–3	United States

Report	Individual matches
Giorgos Konstantinopoulos	2–3	Timothy Aaron Wang	11–6, 7–11, 6–11, 11–9, 7–11
Konstantinos Pa Konstantinopoulos	3–2	Yijun Feng	11–9, 14–16, 9–11, 12–10, 11–6
Ioannis Papadakis	3–1	Jason Nathaniel Plog	11–9, 11–6, 8–11, 11–3
Giorgos Konstantinopoulos	0–3	Yijun Feng	7–11, 9–11, 11–13
Konstantinos Pa Konstantinopoulos	2–3	Timothy Aaron Wang	11–13, 11–7, 15–17, 11–9, 3–11

=== Group 3 ===
Team	Pts	Pld	W	L	MW	ML
North Korea (PRK)	6	3	3	0	9	0
France (FRA)	5	3	2	1	6	3
Chile (CHI)	4	3	1	2	3	6
Lebanon (LBN)	3	3	0	3	0	9

August 22, 2017; 12:00	Chile	0–3	France

Report	Individual matches
Manuel Alfonso Moya Maureira	0–3	Alexandre Cassin	5–11, 3–11, 8–11
Sebastian Patri Roman Aravena	0–3	Andrea Landrieu	9–11, 5–11, 6–11
Marcelo Alejandro Fernandez Silva	0–3	Joe Seyfried	4–11, 12–14, 6–11

August 22, 2017; 12:00	North Korea	3–0	Lebanon

Report	Individual matches
Il Choe	3–0	Habib Antoun	11–1, 11–2, 11–4
Sin Hyok Pak	3–0	Missak Boyajian	11–5, 11–3, 11–6
Wi Hun Kang	3–0	Ralph Hamdar	11–8, 11–3, 11–6

August 22, 2017; 18:00	North Korea	3–0	France

Report	Individual matches
Sin Hyok Pak	3–0	Alexandre Cassin	11–5, 15–13, 11–2
Il Choe	3–0	Andrea Landrieu	11–3, 11–3, 11–9
Wi Hun Kang	3–1	Joe Seyfried	12–10, 8–11, 11–7, 11–7

August 22, 2017; 18:00	Lebanon	0–3	Chile

Report	Individual matches
Missak Boyajian	0–3	Sebastian Patri Roman Aravena	6–11, 4–11, 10–12
Antony Arida	0–3	Manuel Alfonso Moya Maureira	6–11, 6–11, 7–11
Habib Antoun	0–3	Victor Sebastian Coydan Morales	4–11, 2–11, 6–11

August 23, 2017; 12:00	Lebanon	0–3	France

Report	Individual matches
Ralph Hamdar	0–3	Joe Seyfried	8–11, 5–11, 10–12
Antony Arida	0–3	Alexandre Robinot	6–11, 11–13, 2–11
Elie Jeo Abdel Nour	0–3	Alexandre Cassin	5–11, 3–11, 9–11

August 23, 2017; 12:00	Chile	0–3	North Korea

Report	Individual matches
Manuel Alfonso Moya Maureira	0–3	Sin Hyok Pak	8–11, 3–11, 1–11
Sebastian Patri Roman Aravena	2–3	You Song Ham	3–11, 10–12, 11–9, 11–7, 5–11
Marcelo Alejandro Fernandez Silva	0–3	Wi Hun Kang	4–11, 4–11, 10–12

=== Group 4 ===
Team	Pts	Pld	W	L	MW	ML
Chinese Taipei (TPE)	6	3	3	0	9	0
Czech Republic (CZE)	5	3	2	1	6	4
Singapore (SGP)	4	3	1	2	4	6
Colombia (COL)	3	3	0	3	0	9

August 22, 2017; 14:00	Chinese Taipei	3–0	Singapore

Report	Individual matches
Chien-An Chen	3–0	Kiat Yi Kerry Tan	11–4, 11–5, 11–7
Cheng-TIng Liao	3–1	Jit Kiat Tay	11–5, 11–9, 9–11, 11–9
Hung-Chieh Chiang	3–0	Bryan Yisen Teo	11–8, 11–5, 11–4

August 22, 2017; 14:00	Czech Republic	3–0	Colombia

Report	Individual matches
David Reitspies	3–0	Nelson Ivan Cardozo Perez	11–3, 11–8, 11–5
Ondrej Bajger	3–0	Daniel Mauricio Pava Riano	11–3, 11–5, 11–3
Stanislav Kucera	3–0	Carlos Arturo Vergara Barraza	11–4, 11–3, 11–6

August 22, 2017; 20:00	Chinese Taipei	3–0	Czech Republic

Report	Individual matches
Chien-An Chen	3–0	Ondrej Bajger	11–3, 11–4, 11–7
Hung-Chieh Chiang	3–1	David Reitspies	11–3, 11–6, 8–11, 11–3
Cheng-Ting Liao	3–1	Stanislav Kucera	7–11, 11–7, 11–7, 11–8

August 22, 2017; 20:00	Colombia	0–3	Singapore

Report	Individual matches
Daniel Mauricio Pava Riano	0–3	Kiat Yi Kerry Tan	5–11, 10–12, 11–13
Carlos Arturo Vergara Barraza	0–3	Jit Kiat Tay	5–11, 4–11, 10–12
Nelson Ivan Cardozo Perez	0–3	Bryan Yisen Teo	2–11, 3–11, 8–11

August 23, 2017; 14:00	Colombia	0–3	Chinese Taipei

Report	Individual matches
Daniel Mauricio Pava Riano	0–3	Cheng-Ting Liao	3–11, 10–12, 2–11
Nelson Ivan Cardozo Perez	0–3	Chia-Hung Sun	9–11, 8–11, 2–11
Carlos Arturo Vergara Barraza	0–3	Chia-Sheng Lee	3–11, 5–11, 7–11

August 23, 2017; 14:00	Czech Republic	3–1	Singapore

Report	Individual matches
David Reitspies	3–1	Jit Kiat Tay	11–7, 11–5, 9–11, 11–5
Ondrej Bajger	0–3	Kiat Yi Kerry Tan	8–11, 8–11, 7–11
Stanislav Kucera	3–1	Bryan Yisen Teo	11–5, 11–7, 8–11, 11–6
David Reitspies	3–2	Kiat Yi Kerry Tan	9–11, 9–11, 11–6, 12–10, 11–7

=== Group 5 ===
Team	Pts	Pld	W	L	MW	ML
Germany (GER)	6	3	3	0	9	3
Romania (ROU)	5	3	2	1	7	4
Kazakhstan (KAZ)	4	3	1	2	5	6
Philippines (PHI)	3	3	0	3	1	9

August 22, 2017; 14:00	Germany	3–1	Kazakhstan

Report	Individual matches
Liang Qiu	3–0	Denis Zholudev	11–7, 13–11, 11–7
Hermann Muehlbach	1–3	Timur Kelbuganov	11–7, 6–11, 7–11, 9–11
Gianluca Walther	3–0	Bekulan Zhamal	11–5, 11–7, 11–4
Liang Qiu	3–1	Timur Kelbuganov	11–2, 11–4, 8–11, 12–10

August 22, 2017; 14:00	Romania	3–0	Philippines

Report	Individual matches
Alin Marian Spelbus	3–1	Lemuel Agbon	8–11, 11–4, 11–9, 11–6
Alexandru Mihai Manole	3–0	Pausto Zeus Comaingking	11–5, 12–10, 11–5
Lucian Munteanu	3–0	John Vincent Cabaluna	11–5, 11–6, 11–9

August 22, 2017; 20:00	Germany	3–1	Romania

Report	Individual matches
Liang Qiu	3–0	Alin Marian Spelbus	12–10, 11–6, 13–11
Gianluca Walther	0–3	Lucian Munteanu	9–11, 10–12, 9–11
Hermann Muehlbach	3–0	Alexandru Mihai Manole	11–7, 11–8, 11–8
Liang Qiu	3–0	Lucian Munteanu	11–1, 11–7, 11–4

August 22, 2017; 20:00	Philippines	0–3	Kazakhstan

Report	Individual matches
Lemuel Agbon	0–3	Denis Zholudev	10–12, 9–11, 8–11
Aaron Paul Chicano	1–3	Timur Kelbuganov	0–11, 11–8, 1–11, 6–11
John Vincent Cabaluna	0–3	Bekulan Zhamal	7–11, 7–11, 7–11

August 23, 2017; 14:00	Philippines	1–3	Germany

Report	Individual matches
Lemuel Agbon	3–1	Frederik Spreckelsen	11–9, 11–7, 1–11, 12–10
Fausto Zeus Comaingking	0–3	Gianluca Walther	1–11, 6–11, 5–11
Robyn Kyle Veloso	0–3	Hermann Muehlbach	0–11, 6–11, 7–11
Lemuel Agbon	0–3	Gianluca Walther	8–11, 2–11, 3–11

August 23, 2017; 14:00	Romania	3–1	Kazakhstan

Report	Individual matches
Lucian Munteanu	2–3	Denis Zholudev	13–11, 5–11, 11–9, 2–11, 6–11
Alin Marian Spelbus	3–1	Timur Kelbuganov	11–7, 11–8, 8–11, 11–7
Alexandru Mihai Manole	3–1	Bekulan Zhamal	9–11, 11–8, 11–8, 11–5
Lucian Munteanu	3–1	Timur Kelbuganov	12–10, 10–12, 11–6, 11–6

=== Group 6 ===
Team	Pts	Pld	W	L	MW	ML
South Korea (KOR)	6	3	3	0	9	1
Poland (POL)	5	3	2	1	7	5
Australia (AUS)	4	3	1	2	5	7
Canada (CAN)	3	3	0	3	1	9

August 22, 2017; 14:00	South Korea	3–0	Australia

Report	Individual matches
Woojin Jang	3–1	Kane Douglas Townsend	9–11, 11–3, 11–7, 11–6
Jonghoon Lim	3–0	Heming Hu	11–9, 13–11, 11–7
June An	3–0	Erny Yi-Yi Tsao	11–2, 11–9, 11–4

August 22, 2017; 14:00	Poland	3–0	Canada

Report	Individual matches
Patryk Zatowka	3–1	Bryan Ho	11–9, 11–5, 8–11, 11–9
Piotr Chodorski	3–0	Yen Chun Lu	11–7, 12–10, 11–6
Pawel Jakub Fertikowski	3–1	James Pintea	11–4, 11–9, 4–11, 11–2

August 22, 2017; 20:00	Poland	1–3	South Korea

Report	Individual matches
Patryk Zatowka	1–3	Jonghoon Lim	10–12, 5–11, 11–8, 6–11
Michal Bankosz	0–3	Woojin Jang	6–11, 4–11, 7–11
Piotr Chodorski	3–2	Seokho Kim	7–11, 11–2, 11–6, 8–11, 12–10
Patryk Zatowka	1–3	Woojin Jang	11–8, 4–11, 5–11, 8–11

August 22, 2017; 20:00	Canada	1–3	Australia

Report	Individual matches
Bryan Ho	0–3	Kane Douglas Townsend	5–11, 3–11, 9–11
Lester Ka Chun Lee	1–3	Heming Hu	11–5, 4–11, 4–11, 8–11
Klement Chun-Mi Yeung	3–1	Jake Ian Duffy	7–11, 12–10, 11–6, 11–7
Bryan Ho	0–3	Heming Hu	7–11, 7–11, 10–12

August 23, 2017; 14:00	South Korea	3–0	Canada

Report	Individual matches
Seokho Kim	3–0	Klement Chun-Mi Yeung	11–5, 11–3, 11–4
Jonghoon Lim	3–0	Yen Chun Lu	11–8, 11–4, 11–5
Kyungjun Baek	3–2	James Pintea	6–11, 11–5, 10–12, 11–5, 12–10

August 23, 2017; 14:00	Australia	2–3	Poland

Report	Individual matches
Kane Douglas Townsend	3–2	Pawel Jakub Fertikowski	14–12, 12–10, 6–11, 7–11, 11–5
Heming Hu	0–3	Piotr Chodorski	4–11, 8–11, 6–11
Jake Ian Duffy	0–3	Patryk Zatowka	1–11, 8–11, 6–11
Kane Douglas Townsend	3–2	Piotr Chodorski	6–11, 11–9, 11–9, 8–11, 11–9
Heming Hu	1–3	Pawel Jakub Fertikowski	8–11, 9–11, 11–9, 8–11

=== Group 7 ===
Team	Pts	Pld	W	L	MW	ML
Austria (AUT)	6	3	3	0	9	1
Hong Kong (HKG)	5	3	2	1	7	3
Latvia (LAT)	4	3	1	2	3	8
Mongolia (MGL)	3	3	0	3	2	9

August 22, 2017; 14:00	Latvia	0–3	Hong Kong

Report	Individual matches
Leonids Maslovs	0–3	Check Hin Ng	3–11, 5–11, 11–13
Gints Eihmans	0–3	Ka Ho Wong	3–11, 5–11, 12–14
Jevgenijs Gmiraks	0–3	Edwin Chun-Hin Hung	8–11, 6–11, 11–13

August 22, 2017; 14:00	Austria	3–0	Mongolia

Report	Individual matches
Simon Pfeffer	3–0	Chuluudai Ganbat	11–2, 11–1, 11–6
Ao Alexander Chen	3–0	Bilegjargal Purevnyam	11–8, 11–7, 11–6
Martin Storf	3–0	Belguudei Amgalanbaatar	11–2, 11–4, 11–4

August 22, 2017; 20:00	Hong Kong	1–3	Austria

Report	Individual matches
Ka Ho Wong	2–3	Ao Alexander Chen	11–5, 11–7, 9–11, 10–12, 7–11
Edwin Chun-Hin Hung	0–3	Simon Pfeffer	7–11, 5–11, 9–11
Sheung Hei Poon	3–2	Martin Storf	16–14, 11–7, 4–11, 6–11, 11–9
Ka Ho Wong	2–3	Simon Pfeffer	2–11, 11–8, 13–11, 0–11, 3–11

August 22, 2017; 20:00	Mongolia	2–3	Austria

Report	Individual matches
Bilegjargal Purevnyam	3–1	Gints Eihmans	11–3, 12–10, 5–11, 11–6
Chuluudai Ganbat	1–3	Leonids Maslovs	11–8, 9–11, 11–13, 8–11
Barsbold Tumurbaatar	3–0	Jevgenijs Gmiraks	12–10, 11–8, 11–3
Bilegjargal Purevnyam	2–3	Leonids Maslovs	5–11, 5–11, 12–10, 12–10, 9–11
Chuluudai Ganbat	1–3	Gints Eihmans	12–10, 6–11, 4–11, 9–11

August 23, 2017; 14:00	Hong Kong	3–0	Mongolia

Report	Individual matches
Ka Ho Wong	3–0	Chuluudai Ganbat	11–2, 11–3, 11–6
Sheung Hei Poon	3–1	Bilegjargal Purevnyam	11–9, 11–7, 8–11, 11–5
Check Hin Ng	3–0	Belguudei Amgalanbaatar	11–6, 11–6, 11–3

August 23, 2017; 14:00	Latvia	0–3	Austria

Report	Individual matches
Leonids Maslovs	0–3	Ao Alexander Chen	6–11, 4–11, 5–11
Jevgenijs Gmiraks	0–3	Simon Pfeffer	6–11, 2–11, 3–11
Gints Eihmans	0–3	Martin Storf	4–11, 8–11, 6–11

=== Group 8 ===
Team	Pts	Pld	W	L	MW	ML
Sweden (SWE)	6	3	3	0	9	0
Great Britain (GBR)	5	3	2	1	6	3
Estonia (EST)	4	3	1	2	3	8
Sri Lanka (SRI)	3	3	0	3	2	9

August 22, 2017; 14:00	Estonia	0–3	Sweden

Report	Individual matches
Toomas Libene	0–3	Willhelm Kindblad Percan	11–13, 8–11, 2–11
Allar Vellner	0–3	Pontus Olof Roeoese	5–11, 3–11, 2–11
Erik Lindmaee	0–3	Hans Oscar Perman	8–11, 10–12, 5–11

August 22, 2017; 14:00	Sri Lanka	0–3	Great Britain

Report	Individual matches
Imantha Udanjay Kulappuwa Wadu	1–3	Adam Valentine Harrison	5–11, 11–7, 5–11, 7–11
Don Mewa Abeywickrama A. K.	0–3	Daniel James Reed	9–11, 3–11, 8–11
Pasan Bimsara Kavikeshawa	0–3	Colin Stuart Dalgleish	6–11, 3–11, 8–11

August 22, 2017; 20:00	Great Britain	0–3	Sweden

Report	Individual matches
Adam Valentine Harrison	0–3	Hans Oscar Perman	6–11, 2–11, 9–11
Daniel James Reed	2–3	Anders Ivar Chr Kjellson	9–11, 11–7, 7–11, 11–4, 11–13
Colin Stuart Dalgleish	0–3	Willhelm Kindblad Percan	7–11, 12–14, 7–11

August 22, 2017; 20:00	Estonia	3–2	Sri Lanka

Report	Individual matches
Toomas Libene	3–0	Don Mewa Abeywickrama A. K.	11–5, 11–5, 11–7
Erik Lindmaee	1–3	Imantha Udanjay Kulappuwa Wadu	11–9, 3–11, 5–11, 4–11
Toomas Vestli	3–0	Dewram C. G. Galgamuwa Arachchige	11–8, 11–8, 11–7
Toomas Libene	2–3	Imantha Udanjay Kulappuwa Wadu	11–2, 11–8, 12–14, 10–12, 12–14
Erik Lindmaee	3–0	Don Mewa Abeywickrama A. K.	11–3, 11–5, 11–3

August 23, 2017; 14:00	Sweden	3–0	Sri Lanka

Report	Individual matches
Pontus Olof Roeoese	3–0	Dewram C. G. Galgamuwa Arachchige	11–3, 11–6, 11–4
Anders Ivar Chr Kjellson	3–0	Imantha Udanjay Kulappuwa Wadu	11–5, 11–3, 11–6
Jonas Mikael Gu Berglund	3–2	Buddhika Yasiru Unawatuna Hewage	9–11, 11–5, 4–11, 11–4, 11–4

August 23, 2017; 14:00	Estonia	0–3	Great Britain

Report	Individual matches
Toomas Libene	1–3	Daniel James Reed	8–11, 11–8, 9–11, 2–11
Kert Raeis	1–3	Colin Stuart Dalgleish	11–5, 3–11, 6–11, 5–11
Erik Lindmaee	0–3	Adam Valentine Harrison	11–13, 7–11, 2–11

== Playoff Rounds ==
Round of Sixteen
China	3	3	3
United States	0	0	0
Germany	3	2	3	2	3
Great Britain	2	3	1	3	0
South Korea	3	2	2	3	3
Czech Republic	0	3	3	1	0
North Korea	3	3	3
Hong Kong	0	0	0
Chinese Taipei	3	3	3
Romania	1	0	0
Poland	3	3	3
Sweden	0	2	1
Austria	0	0	3	1
Russia	3	3	1	3
France	0	2	0
Japan	3	3	3

Quarter-Finals
China	3	3	3
Germany	0	0	1
South Korea	0	3	1	3	3
North Korea	3	1	3	2	0
Poland	0	0	1
Chinese Taipei	3	3	3
Japan	3	2	3	3
Russia	0	3	0	1

Semifinals
China	3	2	3	3
South Korea	0	3	0	1
Japan	3	3	3
Chinese Taipei	1	1	1

Final
China	3	3	3
Japan	1	2	1

=== Round of Sixteen ===
August 23, 2017; 20:00	United States	0–3	China

Report	Individual matches
Nathan Hunter Hsu	0–3	Lingxuan Kong	4–11, 2–11, 7–11
Jason Nathaniel Plog	0–3	Linfeng Zhu	8–11, 6–11, 10–12
Yijun Feng	0–3	Jiaxin Lai	3–11, 9–11, 3–11

August 23, 2017; 20:00	Germany	3–2	Great Britain

Report	Individual matches
Liang Qiu	3–2	Colin Stuart Dalgleish	11–3, 11–4, 9–11, 9–11, 11–5
Gianluca Walther	2–3	Daniel James Reed	11–8, 5–11, 11–6, 10–12, 9–11
Hermann Muehlbach	3–1	Adam Valentine Harrison	11–9, 11–5, 6–11, 11–7
Liang Qiu	2–3	Daniel James Reed	13–11, 4–11, 10–12, 12–10, 5–11
Gianluca Walther	3–0	Colin Stuart Dalgleish	11–1, 11–9, 11–5

August 23, 2017; 20:00	South Korea	3–2	Czech Republic

Report	Individual matches
Woojin Jang	3–0	Ondrej Bajger	11–6, 11–5, 11–5
Jonghoon Lim	2–3	David Reitspies	11–7, 8–11, 9–11, 11–4, 9–11
Seokho Kim	2–3	Stanislav Kucera	13–15, 8–11, 11–8, 11–7, 6–11
Woojin Jang	3–1	David Reitspies	12–10, 11–9, 9–11, 11–6
Jonghoon Lim	3–0	Ondrej Bajger	11–6, 12–10, 11–7

August 23, 2017; 20:00	North Korea	3–0	Hong Kong

Report	Individual matches
Sin Hyok Pak	3–0	Cheuk Hin Ng	11–4, 11–1, 11–4
Il Choe	3–0	Ka Ho Wong	11–7, 11–4, 11–6
Wi Hun Kang	3–0	Edwin Chun-Hin Hung	11–2, 11–7, 11–5

August 23, 2017; 20:00	Chinese Taipei	3–0	Romania

Report	Individual matches
Chien-An Chen	3–1	Cheuk Hin Ng	14–12, 11–4, 6–11, 11–5
Cheng-Ting Liao	3–0	Alexandru Mihai Manole	12–10, 11–4, 11–5
Hung-Chieh Chiang	3–0	Lucian Munteanu	11–9, 11–5, 11–7

August 23, 2017; 20:00	Poland	3–0	Sweden

Report	Individual matches
Patryk Zatowka	3–0	Hans Oscar Perman	11–7, 13–11, 11–7
Piotr Chodorski	3–2	Anders Ivar Chr	9–11, 13–11, 11–8, 11–13, 11–4
Pawel Jakub Fertikowski	3–1	Pontus Olof Roeoese	11–7, 11–6, 3–11, 11–9

August 23, 2017; 20:00	Austria	1–3	Russia

Report	Individual matches
Simon Pfeffer	0–3	Arseniy Gusev	4–11, 9–11, 4–11
Ao Alexander Chen	0–3	Sadi Ismailov	8–11, 8–11, 3–11
Martin Storf	3–1	Taras Merzlikin	3–11, 11–6, 11–7, 11–9
Simon Pfeffer	1–3	Sadi Ismailov	14–12, 9–11, 5–11, 5–11

August 23, 2017; 20:00	France	0–3	Japan

Report	Individual matches
Alexandre Robinot	0–3	Masaki Yoshida	6–11, 4–11, 3–11
Alexandre Cassin	2–3	Yuya Oshima	11–7, 8–11, 11–9, 6–11, 9–11
Joe Seyfried	0–3	Masataka Morizono	7–11, 9–11, 7–11

=== Quarter-finals ===
August 24, 2017; 19:00	China	3–0	Germany

Report	Individual matches
Linfeng Zhu	3–0	Hermann Muehlbach	11–8, 11–6, 11–8
Lingxuan Kong	3–0	Liang Qiu	11–8, 11–5, 11–7
Jiaxin Lai	3–1	Gianluca Walther	11–4, 8–11, 11–3, 13–11

August 24, 2017; 19:00	South Korea	3–2	North Korea

Report	Individual matches
Woojin Jang	0–3	Sin Hyok Pak	10–12, 11–13, 9–11
Jonghoon Lim	3–1	Il Choe	12–14, 11–6, 12–10, 11–8
Junhee An	1–3	Wi Hun Kang	8–11, 14–12, 7–11, 8–11
Woojin Jang	3–2	Il Choe	12–10, 8–11, 11–13, 11–1, 15–13
Jonghoon Lim	3–0	Sin Hyok Pak	14–12, 11–5, 11–3

August 24, 2017; 29:00	Poland	0–3	Chinese Taipei

Report	Individual matches
Patryk Zatowka	0–3	Cheng-Ting Liao	6–11, 3–11, 7–11
Pawel Jakub Fertikowski	0–3	Chien-An Chen	4–11, 9–11, 6–11
Piotr Chodorski	1–3	Hung-Chieh Chiang	13–11, 5–11, 9–11, 4–11

August 24, 2017; 19:00	Japan	3–1	Russia

Report	Individual matches
Yuya Oshima	3–0	Arseniy Gusev	11–7, 11–4, 11–7,
Masaki Yoshida	2–3	Sadi Ismailov	7–11, 11–8, 11–4, 5–11, 5–11
Masataka Morizono	3–0	Taras Merzlikin	11–6, 11–4, 11–9
Yuya Oshima	3–1	Sadi Ismailov	11–3, 7–11, 11–6, 11–5

=== Semifinals ===
August 25, 2017; 20:00	China	3–1	South Korea

Report	Individual matches
Linfeng Zhu	3–0	Jonghoon Lim	11–8, 11–9, 11–3
Lingxuan Kong	2–3	Woojin Jang	11–6, 3–11, 9–11, 11–5, 7–11
Xin Chen	3–0	Junhee An	11–3, 11–5, 12–10
Linfeng Zhu	3–1	Woojin Jang	11–3, 2–11, 11–5, 11–3

August 25, 2017; 20:00	Japan	3–0	Chinese Taipei

Report	Individual matches
Yuya Oshima	3–1	Cheng-Ting Liao	10–12, 11–8, 11–8, 11–4
Masaki Yoshida	3–1	Chien-An Chen	11–9, 11–4, 4–11, 11–6
Masataka Morizono	3–1	Hung-Chieh Chiang	11–7, 10–12, 11–5, 11–8

=== Final ===
August 26, 2017; 20:00	China	3–0	Japan

Report	Individual matches
Linfeng Zhu	3–1	Masaki Yoshida	10–12, 12–10, 13–11, 11–8
Lingxuan Kong	3–2	Yuya Oshima	8–11, 11–7, 8–11, 11–5, 11–7
Jiaxin Lai	3–1	Masataka Morizono	11–8, 11–2, 9–11, 11–6

== Final ranking ==
Rank	Team	Athletes
1st place, gold medalist(s)	China	Xin Chen, Lingxuan Kong, Jiaxin Lai, Ziyang Yu, Linfeng Zhu
2nd place, silver medalist(s)	Japan	Masataka Morizono, Yuya Oshima, Tonin Ryuzaki, Masaki Yoshida, Kazuhiro Yoshimura
3rd place, bronze medalist(s)	Chinese Taipei	Chien-An Chen, Hung-Chieh Chiang, Chia-Sheng Lee, Cheng-Ting Liao, Chia-Hung Sun
3rd place, bronze medalist(s)	South Korea	Junhee An, Kyungjun Baek, Woojin Jang, Seokho Kim, Jonghoon Lim
5	North Korea	Il Choe, Yu Song Ham, Wi Hun Kang, Sin Hyok Pak
5	Germany	Hermann Muehlbach, Liang Qiu, Frederik Spreckelsen, Gianluca Walther
5	Poland	Michal Bankosz, Piotr Chodorski, Pawel Jakub Fertikowski, Patryk Zatowka
5	Russia	Maxim Chaplygin, Vildan Gadiev, Arseniy Gusev, Sadi Ismailov, Taras Merzlikin
9	Austria	Ao Alexander Chen, Simon Pfeffer, Martin Storf
9	Czech Republic	Ondrej Bajger, Michal Benes, Stanislav Kucera, David Reitspies
9	France	Alexandre Cassin, Andrea Landrieu, Alexandre Robinot, Joe Seyfried
9	Hong Kong	Edwin Chun-Hin Hung, Cheuk Hin Ng, Shiung Hei Poon, Ka Ho Wong
9	Romania	Alexandru Mihai Manole, Lucian Munteanu, Bogdan Mihai Postudor, Alin Marian Spelbus
9	Sweden	Jonas Mikael Gu Berglund, Anders Ivar Chr Kjellson, Willhelm Percan Kindblad, Hans Oscar Perman, Pontus Olof Roeoese
9	Great Britain	Colin Stuart Dalgleish, Adam Valentine Harrison, Daniel James Reed
9	United States	Billy Xu Ding, Yijun Feng, Nathan Hunter Hsu, Jason Nathaniel Plog, Timothy Aaron Wang
17	Argentina	Horacio Cifuentes, Javier Santiago Cillis, Juan Manuel Daher, Franco Titolo, Matias Mario Waldszan
17	Australia	Jake Ian Duffy, Heming Hu, Kane Douglas Townsend, Erny Yi-Yi Tsao
17	Canada	Bryan Ho, Lester Ka Chun, Yen Chun Lu, James Pintea, Klement Chun-Mi Yeung
17	Chile	Victor Sebastian Coydan Morales, Marcelo Alejandro Fernandez Silva, Manuel Alfonso Moya Maureira, Sebastian Patri Roman Aravena
17	Colombia	Nelson Ivan Cardozo Perez, Daniel Mauricio Pava Riano, Carlos Arturo Vergara Barraza
17	Estonia	Toomas Libene, Erik Lindmaee, Kert Raeis, Allar Vellner, Toomas Vestli
17	Greece	Giorgos Konstantinopoulos, Konstantinos Pa Konstantinopoulos, Ioannis Papadakis
17	Kazakhstan	Timur Kelbuganov, Bekulan Zhamal, Denis Zholudev
17	Latvia	Gints Eihmans, Jevgenijs Gmiraks, Leonids Maslovs
17	Lebanon	Elie Joe Abdel Nour, Habib Antoun, Antony Arida, Missak Boyajian, Ralph Hamdar
17	Mongolia	Belguudei Amgalanbaatar, Unubold Bayarsaikhan, Chuluudai Ganbat, Bilegjargal Purevnyam, Barsbold Tumurbaatar
17	New Zealand	Victor Zexin Zh Ma, Roger Rao, Dean Shu, Haikun Wang
17	Oman	Nasser Saif Nas Al Balushi, Al Khalil Ahmed Al Brashdi, Al Julanda Saif Al Kharusi, Haitham Humaid Al Mandhari
17	Philippines	Lemuel Agbon, John Vincent Cabaluna, Aaron Paul Chicano, Fausto Zeus Comaingking, Robyn Kyle Veloso
17	Singapore	Kyros Yik Kiat Koh, Kiat Yi Kerry Tan, Jit Kiat Tay, Bryan Yisen Teo
17	Sri Lanka	Don Mewa Abeywickrama A. K., Dewram C. G. Galgamuwa Arachchige, Pasan Bimsara Kavikeshawa, Imantha Udanjay Kulappuwa Wadu, Buddhika Yasiru Unawatuna Hewage
