= Swimming at the 2017 Summer Universiade – Men's 10 kilometre marathon =

Men's 10 kilometre marathon at the 2017 Summer Universiade
- Venue: New Taipei City Breeze Canal
- Location: Taipei, Taiwan
- Dates: 27 August
- Competitors: 21 from 15 nations
- Winning time: 1:54:52.4

Medalists
gold medal	Gregorio Paltrinieri	Italy
silver medal	Sören Meißner	Germany
bronze medal	Krzysztof Pielowski	Poland

The Men's 10 kilometre marathon competition at the 2017 Summer Universiade was held on 27 August 2017.

== Results ==
The race was started at 6:00.

Rank	Name	Nationality	Time
1st place, gold medalist(s)	Gregorio Paltrinieri	Italy	1:54:52.4
2nd place, silver medalist(s)	Sören Meißner	Germany	1:55:01.5
3rd place, bronze medalist(s)	Krzysztof Pielowski	Poland	1:55:19.6
4	Allan do Carmo	Brazil	1:55:24.2
5	Kirill Belyaev	Russia	1:57:06.8
6	Vitaliy Khudyakov	Kazakhstan	1:57:13.6
7	Victor Colonese	Brazil	1:57:15.2
8	Taiki Nonaka	Japan	1:57:20.3
9	Roman Kozhevnikov	Russia	1:57:21.9
10	Pepijn Smits	Netherlands	1:58:21.2
11	Márk Pap	Hungary	2:00:25.4
12	Cho Cheng-chi	Chinese Taipei	2:00:25.5
13	Matěj Kozubek	Czech Republic	2:01:49.5
14	Yosuke Aoki	Japan	2:01:50.0
15	Vít Ingeduld	Czech Republic	2:01:54.0
16	Shahar Resman	Israel	2:05:37.5
17	Kenessary Kenenbayev	Kazakhstan	2:12:15.6
18	Cristofer Lanuza	Costa Rica	2:16:34.9
	Aleem Mohammed	Trinidad and Tobago	OTL
	Andrea Manzi	Italy	DNF
	Alin Artimon	Romania	DNF
	Oliver Signorini	Australia	DNS
	Kai Edwards	Australia	DNS
	Philippe Guertin	Canada	DNS
	Eric Hedlin	Canada	DNS
	Tobias Robinson	Great Britain	DNS
