= Poland at the 2017 Summer Universiade =

- IOC code: POL
- NOC: Polish Olympic Committee
- Website: http://www.pkol.pl/

in Taipei, Taiwan 19 – 30 August 2017
- Competitors: 180 in 14 sports
- Flag bearer: Konrad Czerniak
- Medals Ranked 11th: Gold 7 Silver 9 Bronze 9 Total 25

Summer Universiade appearances
- 1959; 1961; 1963; 1965; 1967; 1970; 1973; 1975; 1977; 1979; 1981; 1983; 1985; 1987; 1989; 1991; 1993; 1995; 1997; 1999; 2001; 2003; 2005; 2007; 2009; 2011; 2013; 2015; 2017; 2019; 2021; 2025; 2027

Poland participated at the 2017 Summer Universiade in Taipei, Taiwan.

== Medal summary ==
Medal	Name	Sport	Event	Date
Gold	Aleksandra Zamachowska	Fencing	Women's épée	20 August
Gold	Paweł Fajdek	Athletics	Men's hammer throw	24 August
Gold	Małgorzata Hołub	Athletics	Women's 400 metres	25 August
Gold	Marcelina Witek	Athletics	Women's javelin throw	25 August
Gold	Malwina Kopron	Athletics	Women's hammer throw	26 August
Gold	Krystian Zalewski	Athletics	Men's 3000 metres steeplechase	27 August
Silver	Kamila Pytka	Fencing	Women's épée	20 August
Silver	Kacper Majchrzak	Swimming	Men's 200 m freestyle	22 August
Silver	Konrad Bukowiecki	Athletics	Men's shot put	23 August
Silver	Aleksandra Kowalczuk	Taekwondo	Women's +73 kg	24 August
Silver	Kacper Majchrzak	Swimming	Men's 100 m freestyle	24 August
Silver	Joanna Linkiewicz	Athletics	Women's 400 metres hurdles	25 August
Silver	Patrycja Adamkiewicz; Aleksandra Krzemieniecka; Magdalena Leporowska; Hanna Okoniewska	Taekwondo	Women's team Kyorugi	26 August
Silver	Klaudia Kardasz	Athletics	Women's shot put	27 August
Bronze	Filip Broniszewski	Fencing	Men's épée	21 August
Bronze	Kamila Pytka; Barbara Rutz; Martyna Swatowska; Aleksandra Zamachowska	Fencing	Women's team épée	23 August
Bronze	Julia Chrzanowska; Martyna Jelińska; Hanna Łyczbińska; Julia Walczyk	Fencing	Women's team foil	24 August
Bronze	Bartosz Kołecki	Taekwondo	Men's −87 kg	25 August
Bronze	Rafał Omelko	Athletics	Men's 400 metres	25 August
Bronze	Joanna Fiodorow	Athletics	Women's hammer throw	26 August
Bronze	Krzysztof Pielowski	Swimming	Men's 10 kilometre marathon	27 August
Bronze	Damian Czykier	Athletics	Men's 110 metres hurdles	27 August
Bronze	Paulina Guba	Athletics	Women's shot put	27 August

== Archery ==
Compound

Athlete	Event	Ranking round		Round of 24	Round of 16	Round of 8	Round of 4	Semifinals	Final / BM		
Athlete	Event	Score	Seed	Opposition Score	Opposition Score	Opposition Score	Opposition Score	Opposition Score	Opposition Score	Opposition Score	Rank
Łukasz Przybylski	Men's individual compound	679	32	Aman (IND); L 140–140*	did not advance						
Mariya Shkolna	Women's individual compound	672	22	Gunawan Christina (SIN); W 142–139	Jody Vermeulen (NED); W 140–136	Savenkova (RUS); W 143–140	Chen (TPE); L 142–146	did not advance			
Łukasz Przybylski; Mariya Shkolna	Mixed team compound	1351	11	Bye	United States (USA); W 148–146	Turkey (TUR); L 144–155	did not advance				

Recurve

Athlete	Event	Qualification round		1/48 Round	1/24 Round	1/16 Round	1/8 Round	1/4 Round	1/2 Round	Medal Round	Rank
Athlete	Event	Score	Seed	Opposition Score	Opposition Score	Opposition Score	Opposition Score	Opposition Score	Opposition Score	Opposition Score	Rank
Maciej Faldziński	Men's individual recurve	602	62	Kee Hui Teo (SIN); W 6–4	Makhnenko (RUS); L 3–7	did not advance					
Adam Jurzak	Men's individual recurve	616	54	Michal Hlahulek (CZE); L 4–6	did not advance						
Kacper Sierakówski	Men's individual recurve	657	15	Bye	Mc Menamy (USA); W 6–0	Rosli (MAS); W 6–2	Kim (KOR); L 4–6	did not advance			
Maciej Faldziński; Adam Jurzak; Kacper Sierakówski	Men's team recurve	1875	15	Bye			Chinese Taipei (TPE); L 4–5	did not advance			
Joanna Rząsa	Women's individual recurve	629	18	Bye	Kasak (EST); W 6–0	Pavlichenko (UKR); W 6–4	Lee (KOR); L 0–6	did not advance			
Magdalena Śmiałkowska	Women's individual recurve	490	55	Xena Chomapoy (PHI); L 4–6	did not advance						
Sylwia Zyzańska	Women's individual recurve	652	8	Bye		Gibilaro (USA); W 6–0	Miyaki (JPN); L 3–7	did not advance			
Joanna Rząsa; Magdalena Śmiałkowska; Sylwia Zyzańska	Women's team recurve	1771	12	Bye			Ukraine (UKR); L 0–6	did not advance			
Kacper Sierakówski; Sylwia Zyzańska	Mixed team recurve	1309	4	Bye			Slovakia (SVK); W 6–0	Mexico (MEX); L 1–5	did not advance		

== Athletics ==
Men
Track & road events

Athlete	Event	Heat		Quarterfinals		Semifinal		Final	
Athlete	Event	Time	Rank	Time	Rank	Time	Rank	Time	Rank
Eryk Hampel	100 metres	10.76	43 Q	10.74	26	Did not advance			
Przemysław Słowikowski	100 metres	10.65	35	Did not advance					
Piotr Mitka	200 metres	21.68	25	—N/a		Did not advance			
Artur Zaczek	200 metres	21.48	18 Q	—N/a		21.64	18	Did not advance	
Kajetan Duszyński	400 metres	47.57	16 Q	—N/a		46.30	4 Q	46.50	4
Rafał Omelko	400 metres	46.77	1 Q	—N/a		46.73	10 Q	45.56	3rd place, bronze medalist(s)
Artur Kuciapski	800 metres	1:52.44	28 Q	—N/a		1:48.36	4 Q	1:47.69	5
Michał Rozmys	800 metres	1:51.08	9 Q	—N/a		1:48.71	7	Did not advance	
Mateusz Borkowski	1500 metres	3:45.29	6 Q	—N/a				3:50.99	12
Grzegorz Kalinowski	1500 metres	3:49.14	17 Q	—N/a				3:44.57	4
Damian Czykier	110 metres hurdles	14.30	13 Q	—N/a		13.57	1 Q	13.56	3rd place, bronze medalist(s)
Patryk Dobek	400 metres hurdles	50.14	2 Q	—N/a		49.77	6 Q	49.51	5
Krystian Zalewski	3000 metres steeplechase	—N/a						8:35.88	1st place, gold medalist(s)
Grzegorz Zimniewicz; Przemysław Słowikowski; Artur Zaczek; Eryk Hampel; Przemysław Adamski*; Artur Zaczek*	4 × 100 metres relay	DSQ	–	—N/a				Did not advance	
Dariusz Kowaluk; Michał Pietrzak; Andrzej Jaros; Rafał Omelko; Kajetan Duszyński*; Patryk Dobek*	4 × 400 metres relay	DNF	–	—N/a				Did not advance	

Field events

Athlete	Event	Qualification		Final	
Athlete	Event	Result	Rank	Result	Rank
Norbert Kobielski	High jump	2.15	1 Q	2.15	10
Mateusz Jerzy	Pole vault	NH	–	Did not advance	
Robert Sobera	Pole vault	NH	–	Did not advance	
Konrad Bukowiecki	Shot put	19.95	3 Q	20.16	2nd place, silver medalist(s)
Jakub Szyszkowski	Shot put	19.98	2 Q	19.87	5
Bartłomiej Stój	Discus throw	NM	–	Did not advance	
Hubert Chmielak	Javelin throw	66.50	23	Did not advance	
Marcin Krukowski	Javelin throw	77.28	5 Q	79.38	5
Paweł Fajdek	Hammer throw	67.97	7 Q	79.16	1st place, gold medalist(s)

Women
Track & road events

Athlete	Event	Heat		Quarterfinals		Semifinal		Final	
Athlete	Event	Time	Rank	Time	Rank	Time	Rank	Time	Rank
Kamila Ciba	100 metres	11.86	18 Q	12.04	29	Did not advance			
Karolina Zagajewska	100 metres	11.66	8 Q	11.82	16 Q	11.97	15	Did not advance	
Agata Forkasiewicz	200 metres	23.68	2 Q	—N/a		24.10	12	Did not advance	
Małgorzata Kołdej	200 metres	24.13	13 Q	—N/a		24.43	18	Did not advance	
Iga Baumgart	400 metres	54.35	11 Q	—N/a		52.25	5 Q	52.46	5
Małgorzata Hołub	400 metres	54.49	14 Q	—N/a		51.88	1 Q	51.76	1st place, gold medalist(s)
Paulina Mikiewicz-Łapińska	800 metres	2:11.43	19 Q	—N/a		2:03.21	6 Q	2:04.19	7
Martyna Galant	1500 metres	4:19.31	5 Q	—N/a				4:20.90	4
Paulina Kaczyńska	5000 metres	—N/a						15:58.48	5
Karolina Kołeczek	110 metres hurdles	13.42	3 Q	—N/a		13.48	5 Q	13.31	4
Aleksandra Gaworska	400 metres hurdles	57.53	2 Q	—N/a				57.25	4
Joanna Linkiewicz	400 metres hurdles	57.74	4 Q	—N/a				55.90	2nd place, silver medalist(s)
Matylda Kowal	3000 metres steeplechase	—N/a						10:23.47	10
Kamila Ciba; Agata Forkasiewicz; Małgorzata Kołdej; Karolina Zagajewska; Ewa Ochocka*	4 × 100 metres relay	44.10	1 Q	—N/a				44.19	2nd place, silver medalist(s)
Małgorzata Hołub; Iga Baumgart; Patrycja Wyciszkiewicz; Justyna Święty; Aleksandra Gaworska*; Martyna Dąbrowska*	4 × 400 metres relay	3:32.62	2 Q	—N/a				3:26.75	1st place, gold medalist(s)

Field events

Athlete	Event	Qualification		Final	
Athlete	Event	Result	Rank	Result	Rank
Kamila Przybyła	Pole vault	4.00	1 Q	4.10	8
Justyna Śmietanka	Pole vault	4.00	1 Q	4.30	5
Paulina Guba	Shot put	17.36	4 Q	17.76	3rd place, bronze medalist(s)
Klaudia Kardasz	Shot put	17.23	5 Q	17.90	2nd place, silver medalist(s)
Lidia Augustyniak	Discus throw	53.14	10 Q	52.91	9
Daria Zabawska	Discus throw	55.43	7 Q	56.58	4
Marcelina Witek	Javelin throw	57.71	4 Q	63.31	1st place, gold medalist(s)
Joanna Fiodorow	Hammer throw	67.23	3 Q	71.33	3rd place, bronze medalist(s)
Malwina Kopron	Hammer throw	73.01	1 Q	76.85	1st place, gold medalist(s)

== Badminton ==
Athlete	Event	Group Stage				Elimination	Quarterfinal	Semifinal	Final / BM	
Athlete	Event	Opposition Score	Opposition Score	Opposition Score	Rank	Opposition Score	Opposition Score	Opposition Score	Opposition Score	Rank
Mateusz Biernacki; Krzysztof Jakowczuk; Kornelia Marczak; Joanna Stanisz; Przemysław Szydłowski; Mateusz Świerczyński; Magdalena Witek	Mixed team	Bhutan (BHU); W 5–0	Japan (JPN); L 0–5	—N/a			Sri Lanka (SRI); W 3–1	Australia (AUS); W 3–0	Indonesia (INA); L 0–3	

== Basketball ==
=== Women's tournament ===
Group stage

Team	Pld	W	L	PF	PA	PD	Pts
United States	3	3	0	296	139	+157	6
Czech Republic	3	2	1	194	184	+10	5
Poland	3	1	2	193	216	−23	4
Uganda	3	0	3	150	294	−144	3

21 August 2017
15:00 (UTC+8)

Report

Czech Republic	57–52	Poland
Scoring by quarter: 13–15, 21–15, 10–12, 13–10

Hsinchu Municipal Gymnasium

22 August 2017
12:30 (UTC+8)

Report

Poland	53–102	United States
Scoring by quarter: 15–31, 7–19, 16–22, 15–30

Taipei Heping Basketball Gymnasium

23 August 2017
17:30 (UTC+8)

Report

Poland	88–57	Uganda
Scoring by quarter: 26–8, 24–10, 17–19, 21–20

University of Taipei (Tianmu) Gymnasium

== Diving ==
Men

Athlete	Event	Preliminaries		Semifinals		Final	
Athlete	Event	Points	Rank	Points	Rank	Points	Rank
Andrzej Rzeszutek	1 m springboard	340.25	14	did not advance			
Andrzej Rzeszutek	3 m springboard	390.65	9 Q	396.00	11 Q	377.30	12
Kacper Lesiak	1 m springboard	208.75	24	did not advance			
Kacper Lesiak	3 m springboard	313.05	25	did not advance			

== Fencing ==
Men

Athlete	Event	Round of 128	Round of 64	Round of 32	Round of 16	Quarterfinal	Semifinal	Final / BM	
Athlete	Event	Opposition Score	Opposition Score	Opposition Score	Opposition Score	Opposition Score	Opposition Score	Opposition Score	Rank
Maciej Bielec	Épée	did not advance							
Filip Broniszewski	Épée	—N/a	Tychler (RSA); W 15–9	Rubes (CZE); W 15–13	Pittet (SUI); W 15–13	Turnau (EST); W 15–8	Bida (RUS); L 5–15	Did not advance	3rd place, bronze medalist(s)
Daniel Marcol	Épée	Johnston Leyer (CRC); L 11–15	did not advance						
Jan Wenglarczyk	Épée	—N/a	Marchal (FRA); L 10–15	did not advance					
Bartosz Cegielski	Foil	—N/a	Hovhannesyan (ARM); W 15–6	Chuchukalo (UKR); L 9–15	did not advance				
de Bazelaire	Foil	—N/a	did not advance						
Jakub Surwiłło	Foil	—N/a	Marques (BRA); L 14–15	did not advance					
Maxime Tarasiewicz	Foil	—N/a	Hertsyk (UKR); L 8–15	did not advance					
Mikołaj Grzegorek	Sabre	—N/a	D'Armiento (ITA); W 15–12	Yildirim (TUR); L 8–15	did not advance				
Jakub Jaskot	Sabre	—N/a	Yildirim (TUR); L 7–15	did not advance					
Krzysztof Kaczkowski	Sabre	did not advance							
Jakub Ociński	Sabre	—N/a	Fotouhi (IRI); L 11–15	did not advance					
Mikołaj Grzegorek; Jakub Jaskot; Krzysztof Kaczkowski; Jakub Ociński	Team Épée	—N/a			Hungary (HUN); L 23–45	did not advance			
	Team Foil	—N/a			Hong Kong (HKG); L 38–45	did not advance			
Maciej Bielec; Filip Broniszewski; Daniel Marcol; Andrzej Wenglarczyk	Team Sabre	—N/a		Portugal (POR); W 45–38	Japan (JPN); L 29–31	did not advance			

Women

Athlete	Event	Round of 64	Round of 32	Round of 16	Quarterfinal	Semifinal	Final / BM	
Athlete	Event	Opposition Score	Opposition Score	Opposition Score	Opposition Score	Opposition Score	Opposition Score	Rank
Kamila Pytka	Épée	Vanbenthuysen (USA); W 15–10	Choi (KOR); W 15–8	Foietta (ITA); W 9–7	Song (KOR); W 9–8	Pantelyeyeva (UKR)	Zamachowska (POL); L 6–15	2nd place, silver medalist(s)
Barbara Rutz	Épée	Shiraishi (JPN); L 11–15	did not advance					
Martyna Swatowska	Épée	Hark (EST); W 15–11	Bezhura (UKR); W 15–14	Zamachowska (POL); L 7–15	did not advance			
Aleksandra Zamachowska	Épée	Komarova (RUS); W 15–11	Shiraishi (JPN); W 15–11	Swatowska (POL); W 15–7	Linde (SWE); W 15–5	Marzani (ITA); W 15–10	Pytka (POL); W 15–6	1st place, gold medalist(s)
Julia Chrzanowska	Foil	Ondarts (ARG); W 15–7	Cecchini (BRA); W 15–11	Monaco (ITA); L 7–15	did not advance			
Martyna Jelińska	Foil	—N/a	Xu (CHN); L 8–15	did not advance				
Hanna Łyczbińska	Foil	—N/a	Cellerova (SVK); W 15–3	Kreiss (HUN); L 9–15	did not advance			
Julia Walczyk	Foil	—N/a	Calissi (ITA); L 11–15	did not advance				
Katarzyna Kędziora	Sabre	Manunya (THA); W 15–10	Emura (JPN); L 11–15	did not advance				
Martyna Komisarczyk	Sabre	Bye	Yoon (KOR); W 15–14	Rifkiss (FRA); L 11–15	did not advance			
Marta Puda	Sabre	Navarria (ITA); L 13–15	did not advance					
Angelika Wątor	Sabre	Palmedo (USA); W 15–8	Mormile (ITA); L 11–15	did not advance				
Kamila Pytka; Barbara Rutz; Martyna Swatowska; Aleksandra Zamachowska	Team Épée	—N/a		Estonia (EST); W 45–40	Russia (RUS); W 41–40	Ukraine (UKR); L 38–45	France (FRA); W 45–36	3rd place, bronze medalist(s)
Julia Chrzanowska; Martyna Jelińska; Hanna Łyczbińska; Julia Walczyk	Team Foil	—N/a		India (IND); W 45–18	China (CHN); W 45–24	Russia (RUS); L 39–40	Hungary (HUN); W 45–31	3rd place, bronze medalist(s)
Katarzyna Kędziora; Martyna Komisarczyk; Marta Puda; Angelika Wątor	Team Sabre	—N/a		Iran (IRI); W 45–44	Italy (ITA); W 45–40	Hungary (HUN); L 36–45	Italy (ITA); L 44–45	4

== Golf ==
Athlete	Event	Round 1	Round 2	Round 3	Total		
Athlete	Event	Score	Score	Score	Score	Par	Rank
Artur Dziegiel	Men's individual	84	81	79	244	28+	56
Jan Szalagan	Men's individual	91	83	98	272	56+	65
Jan Szmidt	Men's individual	78	70	70	218	2+	21
Artur Dziugiel; Jan Szalagan; Jan Szmidt	Men's team	162	151	149	462	86+	18
Iga Józefiak	Women's individual	91	Withdraw				
Amanda Majsterek	Women's individual	82	84	86	252	36+	52
Katarzyna Selwent	Women's individual	81	87	82	250	34+	51
Iga Józefiak; Amanda Majsterek; Katarzyna Selwent	Women's team	163	171	168	502	70+	17

== Gymnastics ==
=== Artistic ===
Men

Athlete	Event	Qualification								Final							
Athlete	Event	Apparatus						Total	Rank	Apparatus						Total	Rank
Athlete	Event	F	PH	R	V	PB	HB	Total	Rank	F	PH	R	V	PB	HB	Total	Rank
Piotr Kiełbik	Individual	12.450	—N/a		13.125	—N/a		25.550	109	did not advance						—N/a	
Sebastian Cecot	Individual	—N/a				10.250	11.950	22.200	115	did not advance						—N/a	

Women

Athlete	Event	Qualification						Final					
Athlete	Event	Apparatus				Total	Rank	Apparatus				Total	Rank
Athlete	Event	V	UB	BB	F	Total	Rank	V	UB	BB	F	Total	Rank
Gabriela Janik	Individual	13.750 Q	13.050	11.650	11.750	50.200	11 Q	13.900	13.150	12.500	12.500	52.050	7
Gabriela Janik	Vault	—N/a						13.400	—N/a			13.400	5

== Judo ==
Men

Athlete	Event	1/16 Final	1/8 Final	1/4 Final	Semifinal	Repechage 16	Repechage 8	Final Repechage	Final / BM	
Athlete	Event	Opposition Score	Opposition Score	Opposition Score	Opposition Score	Opposition Score	Opposition Score	Opposition Score	Opposition Score	Rank
Adrian Wala	Men's −60 kg	Zaparita (PHI); W 10–00	Yang (TPE); L 00–10	did not advance		Leranoz (ARG); W 01–00	Rahima (ISR); L 00–10	did not advance		
Patryk Wawrzyczek	Men's −66 kg	Lutfillaev (UZB); W 00–00	van Harten (NED); L 00–10	did not advance						
Wiktor Mrówczyński	Men's −73 kg	Merheb (LBN); W 11–00	Valiyev (AZE); L 00–01	did not advance		Amandeep (IND); W 10–00	Shaimerdenov (KAZ); L 00–01	did not advance		
Patryk Ciechomski	Men's −81 kg	Droux (SUI); W 11–01	Lee (KOR); L 00–10	did not advance		Cherkai (UKR); W 01–00	Mikuckis (LAT); W 12–00	Gutsche (GER); L 00–10	Did not advance	7
Patryk Ciechomski	Men's −90 kg	Salvador (POR); W 02–00	Gwak (KOR); L 00–02	did not advance		Beljic (CRO); W 01–00	Duda (LAT); L 00–01	did not advance		
Tomasz Domański	Men's −100 kg	Hadolin (SLO); W 11–00	El Chaer (LBN); W 10–00	Iida (JPN); W 00–11	Did not advance	Bye	Kumrić (CRO); W 01–00	Gouveia de Souza (BRA); W 11–00	Bilalov (RUS); L 00–12	5
Kamil Grabowski	Men's +100 kg	Boldpurev (MGL); W 10–00	Ju (KOR); L 10–10	did not advance		Bye	Bouhbal (ALG); W 12–00	Ouchani (FRA); W 03–00	Brachev (RUS); L 00–10	5
Kamil Grabowski	Men's Open weight	Orazbayev (KAZ); L 00–01	did not advance			Isquierdo da Silva (BRA); L 00–10	did not advance			
Patryk Ciechomski; Tomasz Domański; Kamil Grabowski; Jakub Kubieniec; Wiktor Mrówczyński; Adrian Wala; Patryk Wawrzyczek	Men's team	Bye	Algeria (ALG); W 3–2	Russia (RUS); L 0–5	Did not advance	Bye		Estonia (EST); W 5–0	Brazil (BRA); L 0–5	5

Women

Athlete	Event	1/16 Final	1/8 Final	1/4 Final	Semifinal	Repechage 16	Repechage 8	Final Repechage	Final / BM	
Athlete	Event	Opposition Score	Opposition Score	Opposition Score	Opposition Score	Opposition Score	Opposition Score	Opposition Score	Opposition Score	Rank
Joanna Stankiewicz	Women's −48 kg	Awitan (PHI); W 10–00	Jeong (KOR); L 00–10	did not advance		—N/a	Zegers (NED); W 10–00	Galbadrakh (KAZ); L 00–11	Did not advance	7
Arleta Podolak	Women's −57 kg	Karassaikyzy (KAZ); W 01–00	Keliger (HUN); L 01–10	did not advance						
Urszula Hofman	Women's −70 kg	Bye	Podelenczki (ROU); W 01–00	Chianca Timo (BRA); L 00–10	Did not advance	Bye	Paissoni (ITA); L 00–10	did not advance		
Weronika Kulaga	Women's −78 kg	Bye	Babintseva (RUS); L 00–10	did not advance		Bye	Marin Florez (COL); W 11–00	Ziech (GER); L 00–01	Did not advance	7
Anna Załęczna	Women's +78 kg	Sutalo (CRO)	did not advance							
Anna Załęczna	Women's Open weight	—N/a	Tsai (TPE); W 12–00	Gasparian (RUS); L 00–10	Did not advance	—N/a	Erdenebileg (MGL); W 11–00	Jacinto Daniel (BRA); L 11–00	Did not advance	7
Urszula Hofman; Paula Kulaga; Arleta Podolak; Joanna Stankiewicz; Anna Załęczna	Women's team	Bye	Croatia (CRO); L 2–3	did not advance						

== Swimming ==
Men

Athlete	Event	Heat		Semifinal		Final	
Athlete	Event	Time	Rank	Time	Rank	Time	Rank
Rafał Bugdol	50 m backstroke	26.06	23	did not advance			
Rafał Bugdol	100 m backstroke	56.87	33	did not advance			
Konrad Czerniak	50 m butterfly	23.97	9 Q	23.76	8 Q	23.62	5
Konrad Czerniak	100 m butterfly	53.16	11 Q	52.40	5 Q	52.00	4
Konrad Czerniak	50 m freestyle	22.37	7 Q	22.32	8 Q	22.41	8
Kacper Majchrzak	100 m freestyle	49.48	7 Q	48.68	2 Q	48.38	2nd place, silver medalist(s)
Kacper Majchrzak	200 m freestyle	1:49.46	5 Q	1:47.91	4 Q	1:46.19	2nd place, silver medalist(s)
Krzysztof Pielowski	1500 m freestyle	15:24.04	10	did not advance			
Tomasz Polewka	50 m backstroke	25.25	5 Q	25.11	2 Q	25.18	5
Tomasz Polewka	100 m backstroke	55.72	15 Q	55.28	15	did not advance	
Michał Poprawa	50 m butterfly	24.50	29	did not advance			
Michał Poprawa	100 m butterfly	53.00	8 Q	52.82	10	did not advance	
Michał Poprawa	200 m butterfly	1:59.40	12 Q	did not start		did not advance	
Michał Poprawa	200 m individual medley	2:01.59	5 Q	2:01.09	6 Q	2:01.17	6
Paweł Sendyk	100 m freestyle	50.83	34	did not advance			
Marcin Stolarski	50 m breaststroke	28.24	16	did not advance			
Marcin Stolarski	100 m breaststroke	1:01.22	7 Q	1:01.14	8 Q	1:01.30	8
Marcin Stolarski	200 m breaststroke	2:19.89	38	did not advance			
Dawid Szwedzki	200 m individual medley	2:04.09	21	did not advance			
Dawid Szwedzki	400 m individual medley	4:18.43	4 Q	—N/a		4:18.11	5
Filip Wypych	50 m freestyle	22.73	19	did not advance			
Filip Wypych	50 m breaststroke	28.62	29	did not advance			
Mateusz Wysoczyński	200 m freestyle	1:50.61	18	did not advance			
Paweł Sendyk; Rafał Bugdol; Mateusz Wysoczyński; Kacper Majchrzak	4 × 100 m freestyle relay	3:17.83	5 Q	—N/a		3:16.43	4
Rafał Bugdol; Damian Goździk; Kacper Majchrzak; Michał Poprawa; Mateusz Wysoczyński	4 × 200 m freestyle relay	7:25.34	8 Q	—N/a		7:17.54	5
Tomasz Polewka; Marcin Stolarski; Konrad Czerniak; Kacper Majchrzak; Michał Poprawa	4 × 100 m medley relay	3:38.34	5 Q	—N/a		3:36.34	4

Women

Athlete	Event	Heat		Semifinal		Final	
Athlete	Event	Time	Rank	Time	Rank	Time	Rank
Justyna Burska	800 m freestyle	8:56.42	17	—N/a		did not advance	
Joanna Cieślak	50 m freestyle	27.29	36	did not advance			
Joanna Cieślak	100 m freestyle	57.74	28	did not advance			
Joanna Cieślak	200 m freestyle	2:08.60	39	did not advance			
Anna Dowgiert	50 m butterfly	26.75	4 Q	26.40	3 Q	26.63	5
Anna Dowgiert	50 m freestyle	25.66	10 Q	25.68	13	did not advance	
Kalina Gralewska	100 m freestyle	56.86	21	did not advance			
Kalina Gralewska	200 m freestyle	2:05.13	29	did not advance			
Milena Karpisz	400 m freestyle	4:21.14	20	did not advance			
Milena Karpisz	800 m freestyle	8:48.88	14	—N/a		did not advance	
Klaudia Naziębło	50 m backstroke	29.39	19	did not advance			
Klaudia Naziębło	100 m backstroke	1:02.04	17	did not advance			
Klaudia Naziębło	200 m backstroke	2:14.18	11 Q	2:15.86	15	did not advance	
Klaudia Naziębło	200 m butterfly	2:13.47	6 Q	2:11.95	8 Q	2:12.47	6
Dominika Sztandera	50 m breaststroke	31.49	4 Q	31.78	6 Q	31.59	5
Dominika Sztandera	100 m breaststroke	1:10.68	15 Q	1:11.56	16	did not advance	
Alicja Tchórz	50 m backstroke	28.45	3 Q	28.39	4 Q	28.32	5
Alicja Tchórz	100 m backstroke	1:01.14	7 Q	1:01.25	9	did not advance	
Alicja Tchórz	200 m backstroke	2:13.12	9 Q	did not start		did not advance	
Joanna Zachoszcz	1500 m freestyle	17:03.64	12	—N/a		did not advance	
Paula Żukowska	200 m individual medley	2:17.93	15 Q	2:17.24	13	did not advance	
Paula Żukowska	400 m individual medley	4:48.55	11	—N/a		did not advance	
Paula Żukowska	200 m butterfly	2:16.55	18	did not advance			
Dominika Sztandera; Joanna Cieślak; Kalina Gralewska; Anna Dowgiert	4 × 100 m freestyle relay	3:46.95	10	—N/a		did not advance	
Kalina Gralewska; Paula Żukowska; Joanna Cieślak; Justyna Burska	4 × 200 m freestyle relay	DSQ		—N/a		did not advance	
Alicja Tchórz; Dominika Sztandera; Klaudia Naziębło; Anna Dowgiert	4 × 100 m medley relay	4:07.52	6 Q	—N/a		4:05.95	8

== Table tennis ==
Athlete	Event	Round 1 Round of 1/64	Round 2 Round of 1/32	Round 3 Round of 1/16	Round of 1/8	Quarterfinals	Semifinals	Final / BM	
Athlete	Event	Opposition Result	Opposition Result	Opposition Result	Opposition Result	Opposition Result	Opposition Result	Opposition Result	Rank
Michał Bankosz	Men's singles	Lara Escalante (MEX); W 3–2; Wang (NZL); W 3–0	Manhani (BRA); L 0–4	did not advance					
Piotr Chodorski	Men's singles	Plog (USA); W 3–0; Boyajian (LBN); W 3–0	Ryuzaki (JPN); W 4–2	Song (PRK); W 4–3	Chen (TPE); L 0–4	did not advance			
Patryk Zatówka	Men's singles	Libene (EST); W 3–0; Wang (USA); W 3–0	Duffy (AUS); W 4–1	Pak (PRK); L 1–4	did not advance				
Natalia Bajor	Women's singles	Ang (SGP); L 2–3; Sadek (LBN); W 3–0	did not advance						
Klaudia Kusińska	Women's singles	Lui (HKG); W 3–0; Banda (ZAM); W 3–0	Guan (USA); W 4–2	Chen (TPE); L 1–4	did not advance				
Roksana Załomska	Women's singles	Diendorfer (AUT); W 3–0; Yamamoto (JPN); L 0–3	did not advance						
Michał Bankosz; Piotr Chodorski	Men's doubles	—N/a	Poon (HKG) / Wong (HKG); W 3–1	Morizono (JPN) / Oshima (JPN); L 0–3	did not advance				
Paweł Fertikowski; Patryk Zatówka	Men's doubles	—N/a	Choe (PRK) / Pak (PRK); L 0–3	did not advance					
Natalia Bajor; Roksana Załomska	Women's doubles	—N/a	Konsbruck (LUX) / Stammet (LUX); W 3–0	Wu (USA) / Zhang (USA); L 0–3	did not advance				
Michał Bankosz; Roksana Załomska	Mixed doubles	—N/a	Pak (PRK) / Kim (PRK); L 0–3	did not advance					
Piotr Chodorski; Natalia Bajor	Mixed doubles	—N/a	Kelbuganov (KAZ) / Alimbayeva (KAZ); W 3–0	Jang (KOR) / Jeon (KOR); L 0–3	did not advance				
Michał Bankosz; Piotr Chodorski; Paweł Fertikowski; Patryk Zatówka	Men's team	Canada (CAN); W 3–0	South Korea (KOR); L 1–3	Australia (AUS); W 3–2	Sweden (SWE); W 3–0	Chinese Taipei (TPE); L 0–3	did not advance		5
Natalia Bajor; Klaudia Kusińska; Roksana Załomska	Women's team	Canada (CAN); W 3–0	Singapore (SIN); W 3–0	Australia (AUS); W 3–0	Austria (AUT); W 3–0	Japan (JPN); L 0–3	did not advance		5

== Taekwondo ==
Athlete	Event	Round of 64	Round of 32	Round of 16	Quarterfinals	Semifinals	Final	
Athlete	Event	Opposition Result	Opposition Result	Opposition Result	Opposition Result	Opposition Result	Opposition Result	Rank
Mateusz Nowak	Men's −58 kg	—N/a	Melki (LBN); L 8–23	did not advance				
Jarosław Mecmajer	Men's −63 kg	—N/a	Allalyev (RUS); W 15–12	Baglar (TUR); W 20–13	Guzman (TUR); L 3–17	did not advance		5
Jakub Posadzy	Men's −68 kg	—N/a		Faraje (LBN); W 18–17	Chan (CAN); L 4–25	did not advance		5
Mikołaj Szaferski	Men's −74 kg	—N/a	Dantas a Reis (BRA); L 11–13	did not advance				
Karol Hołubowicz	Men's −80 kg	Fernandes (POR); L 10–11	did not advance					
Bartosz Kołecki	Men's −87 kg	—N/a		Sep (CRO); W 22–14	Soumare (SEN); W 17–15	Lee (KOR); L 6–13	Did not advance	3rd place, bronze medalist(s)
Karol Hołubowicz; Jarosław Mecmajer; Mikołaj Szaferski; Jakub Posadzy	Men's team Kyorugi	—N/a	Brazil (BRA); W 27–25	Mongolia (MGL); W 26–24	Kazakhstan (KAZ); L 21–22	did not advance		5
Justyna Pałaszewska	Women's −49 kg	—N/a	Ilchyk (UKR); L 3–4	did not advance				
Hanna Okoniewska	Women's −53 kg	—N/a	Kaidi (SWE); W 30–8	Chambers (USA); L 1–3	did not advance			
Patrycja Adamkiewicz	Women's −57 kg	—N/a		Tuladhar (NEP); W 27–0	Chelokhsaeva (RUS); L 4–5	did not advance		5
Magdalena Leporowska	Women's −62 kg	—N/a	Balguy (FRA); W 13–3	Yaman (TUR); L 2–15	did not advance			
Anika Godel	Women's −67 kg	—N/a		Mirhosseini (IRI); L WDR	did not advance			
Aleksandra Krzemieniecka	Women's −73 kg	—N/a		Bao (CHN); W 24–11	Bulut (TUR); L 4–6	did not advance		5
Aleksandra Kowalczuk	Women's +73 kg	—N/a		Bardachenko (RUS); W 16–6	Barua (IND); W 23–2	Adamić-Golić (CRO); W 6–1	An (KOR); L 8–10	2nd place, silver medalist(s)
Patrycja Adamkiewicz; Magdalena Leporowska; Hanna Okoniewska; Aleksandra Krzemieniecka	Women's team Kyorugi	—N/a		France (FRA); W 18–16	Hungary (HUN); W 13–12	Mexico (MEX); W 10–8	Serbia (SRB); L 5–36	2nd place, silver medalist(s)

== Tennis ==
Men

Athlete	Event	First round	Second round	Third round	Fourth round	Quarterfinals	Semifinals	Final / BM	
Athlete	Event	Opposition Score	Opposition Score	Opposition Score	Opposition Score	Opposition Score	Opposition Score	Opposition Score	Rank
Szymon Walków	Singles	Bye	Ortega (ARG); L 7–6^{4}, 5–7, 2–6	did not advance					
Piotr Matuszewski	Singles	Bye	Fakih (LBN); W 6–4, 7–6^{5}	Ofner (AUT); L 0–6, 6^{5}–7	did not advance				
Kamil Gajewski; Szymon Walków	Doubles	Soemarno (INA) / Ramdani (INA); W 6–1, 6–4	Findel-Hawkins (GBR) / Johnson (GBR); L 4–6, 4–6	—N/a		did not advance			

Women

Athlete	Event	First round	Second round	Third round	Fourth round	Quarterfinals	Semifinals	Final / BM	
Athlete	Event	Opposition Score	Opposition Score	Opposition Score	Opposition Score	Opposition Score	Opposition Score	Opposition Score	Rank
Paulina Czarnik	Singles	Bye	Parajova (SVK); W 6–3, 6–4	Kahfiani (INA); W 6–3, 6–4	Rodríguez (MEX); L 2–6, 0–6	did not advance			
Justyna Jegiołka	Singles	Bye	Almahafza (JOR); W 6–0, 6–1	Mendesová (CZE); L 4–6, 3–6	did not advance				
Paulina Czarnik; Justyna Jegiołka	Doubles	Montiel (ARG) / Surraco (ARG); W 6–0, 6–2	Chong (HKG) / Ip (HKG); L 3–6, 3–6	—N/a		did not advance			

Mixed

Athlete	Event	Round of 64	Round of 32	Round of 16	Quarterfinals	Semifinals	Final / BM	
Athlete	Event	Opposition Score	Opposition Score	Opposition Score	Opposition Score	Opposition Score	Opposition Score	Rank
Justyna Jegiołka; Kamil Gajewski	Mixed doubles	Bye	Surraco (ARG) / Aranguren (ARG); W 6–0, 6–2	Parajova (SVK) / Kosec (SVK); L 1–6, 4–6	did not advance			

== Weightlifting ==
Athlete	Event	Snatch		Clean & Jerk		Total	Rank
Athlete	Event	Result	Rank	Result	Rank	Total	Rank
Szymon Rotnicki	Men's −69 kg	125	13	149	13	274	13
Damian Szczepanik	Men's −85 kg	145	11	180	7	325	7
Adrian Pawlicki	Men's −94 kg	145	14	185	13	330	13
Przemysław Budek	Men's +105 kg	175	5	210	6	385	5
Monika Dzienis	Women's −63 kg	84	12	94	18	178	17
Patrycja Piechowiak	Women's −69 kg	92	6	110	13	202	10
