= Burundi at the 2017 Summer Universiade =

- IOC code: BDI

in Taipei July 19-30
- Competitors: 2 (1 men & 1 women) in 1 sport
- Medals: Gold 0 Silver 0 Bronze 0 Total 0

Summer Universiade appearances
- 1959; 1961; 1963; 1965; 1967; 1970; 1973; 1975; 1977; 1979; 1981; 1983; 1985; 1987; 1989; 1991; 1993; 1995; 1997; 1999; 2001; 2003; 2005; 2007; 2009; 2011; 2013; 2015; 2017; 2019; 2021

Burundi participated at the 2017 Summer Universiade which was held in Taipei, Taiwan.

Burundi’s delegation consisted of only 2 competitors for the event competing in a single sporting event. Burundi did not claim any medals at the multi-sport event.

== Participants ==
Sport	Men	Women	Total
Judo	1	1	2

== Judo ==
Athlete	Event	Round of 64	Round of 32	Round of 16	Quarterfinals	Repechage 32	Repechage 16	Repechage 8	Final Repechage	Semifinals	Final / BM	
Athlete	Event	Opposition Result	Opposition Result	Opposition Result	Opposition Result	Opposition Result	Opposition Result	Opposition Result	Opposition Result	Opposition Result	Opposition Result	Rank
Nadege Iziguriza	Women's -78 kg	—	Bye	Amina Temmar (ALG); L 00–10	did not advance							—
Samuel Kwitonda	Men's -81 kg	Dominik Druzeta (CRO); W 00–00	Dorin Gotonoaga (MDA); L 10–00S1	Bye			Robin Gutsche (GER); L 10–00	did not advance				—
