= Croatia at the 2017 Summer Universiade =

- IOC code: CRO
- NOC: Croatian Olympic Committee
- Website: www.hoo.hr/en

in Taipei, Taiwan 19 – 30 July 2017
- Competitors: 38 in 8 sports
- Medals Ranked 60th: Gold 0 Silver 0 Bronze 3 Total 3

Summer Universiade appearances
- 1959; 1961; 1963; 1965; 1967; 1970; 1973; 1975; 1977; 1979; 1981; 1983; 1985; 1987; 1989; 1991; 1993; 1995; 1997; 1999; 2001; 2003; 2005; 2007; 2009; 2011; 2013; 2015; 2017; 2019; 2021

Croatia participated at the 2017 Summer Universiade, in Taipei, Taiwan with 38 competitors in 8 sports.

== Competitors ==
The following table lists Croatia's delegation per sport and gender.

Sport	Men	Women	Total
Archery	1	0	1
Athletics	2	4	6
Diving	1	0	1
Gymnastics	4	1	5
Gymnastics	4	1	5
Judo	5	5	10
Table Tennis	0	4	4
Taekwondo	5	4	9
Tennis	2	0	2
Total	24	14	38

== Medal summary ==
Medals by sport
Sport	1st place, gold medalist(s)	2nd place, silver medalist(s)	3rd place, bronze medalist(s)	Total
Archery	0	0	1	1
Taekwondo	0	0	2	2
Total	0	0	3	3

== Archery ==
Athlete	Event	Ranking round		Round of 48	Round of 32	Round of 16	Quarterfinals	Semifinals	Final / BM	
Athlete	Event	Score	Seed	Opposition Score	Opposition Score	Opposition Score	Opposition Score	Opposition Score	Opposition Score	Rank
Mario Vavro	Men's Compound Individual	695	4	Bye	Viviano Mior (ITA); W 147-141	Amanjeet Singh (IND); W 144-140	Victor Kalashnikov (RUS); W 144-142	Jongho Kim (KOR); L 146-146	Taeyoon Kim (KOR); W 143-138	3rd place, bronze medalist(s)

== Athletics ==
=== Track Events ===
Athlete	Event	Round 1		Round 2		Semifinal		Final	
Athlete	Event	Result	Rank	Result	Rank	Result	Rank	Result	Rank
Ivana Lorcarek	Women's 100m Hurdles	13.62	3Q	—		13.92	5	Did not advance	
Matea Parlov	Women's 5000m	—						16:20.91	12
Lucija Pokos	Women's 200m	25.55	6	—		Did not advance			
Mateo Ruzic	Men's 400m	46.93	2Q	—		46.90	7	Did not advance	

=== Field Events ===
Athlete	Event	Qualification		Final	
Athlete	Event	Distance	Position	Distance	Position
Martin Markovic	Men's Discus	55.40	6q	56.49	10

== Diving ==
Athlete	Event	Preliminaries		Semifinals		Final	
Athlete	Event	Points	Rank	Points	Rank	Points	Rank
Juraj Melsa	Men's 1m Springboard	226.85	28	Did not advance			
Juraj Melsa	Men's 3m Springboard	316.20	23	Did not advance			

== Gymnastics ==
=== Men ===
Individual

Athlete	Event	Apparatus						Total	Rank
Athlete	Event	F	PH	R	V	PB	HB	Total	Rank
Matija Baron	Pommel Horse	—	10.866	—				10.866	8

Team

Athlete	Event	Apparatus						Total	Rank
Athlete	Event	F	PH	R	V	PB	HB	Total	Rank
Matija Baron	Team	10.950	13.900	5.750	10.600	—	10.800	52.000	76
Renato Prpic	Team	3.350	13.100	3.450	—	4.600	—	24.500	112
Jakov Vlahek	Team	10.850	13.600	—	10.600	10.950	6.200	52.200	74
Kristijan Vugrinski	Team	—	11.350	6.050	10.400	11.375	1.150	40.325	92
Total	Team	25.150	40.600	15.250	31.600	26.925	18.150	157.675	20

=== Women ===
Team

Athlete	Event	Apparatus						Total	Rank
Athlete	Event	F	PH	R	V	PB	HB	Total	Rank
Ema Kajic	Team	13.000	—					13.000	68

== Judo ==
=== Men ===
Athlete	Event	Round of 64	Round of 32	Round of 16	Quarterfinals	Repechage 32	Repechage 16	Repechage 8	Final Repechage	Semifinals	Final / BM	
Athlete	Event	Opposition Result	Opposition Result	Opposition Result	Opposition Result	Opposition Result	Opposition Result	Opposition Result	Opposition Result	Opposition Result	Opposition Result	Rank
Bernard Azinovic	Men's -60 kg	—	Baiaman Sagynbai Uulu (KGZ); L 00-12S1	Did not advance								—
Denis Beljic	Men's -90 kg	Bye	Donghan Gwak (KOR); L 00S3-11S1	—	Bye			Patryk Ciechomski (POL); L 00S2-01S1	Did not advance			—
Marko Draskovic	Men's -66 kg	Fredo Ngbungbu Yagolo (COD); W 00-00	Michael Agbo (NGR); W 00-00	Erkhembayar Battogtokh (MGL); L 00-10	Bye	—	Ka In Leong (MAC); W 10-00	Matthijs Van Harten (NED); W 10-00	Manuel Lorenz Scheibel (MGL); L 00-11	Did not advance		7
Dominik Druzeta	Men's -81 kg	Samuel Kwitonda (BDI); L DNS-00	Did not advance									—
Marko Kumric	Men's -100 kg	—	Luca Mihai Kunszabo (ROU); W 01-00S1	Kentaro Iida (JPN); L 00S3-10	Bye	—	Zilvinas Lekavicius (LTU); W 02-00	Tomasz Arkadius Domanski (POL); L 00S1-01	Did not advance			—
Marko Kumric	Men's Open Category	—	Bye	Tomas Spikermann (ARG); W 10-00	Musa Tumenov (RUS); W 00S1-00S2	—	Bye			Hyoga Ota (JPN); L 00-11	Ruan Isquierdo Da Silva (BRA); L 01-11	5

=== Women ===
Athlete	Event	Round of 64	Round of 32	Round of 16	Quarterfinals	Repechage 32	Repechage 16	Repechage 8	Final Repechage	Semifinals	Final / BM	
Athlete	Event	Opposition Result	Opposition Result	Opposition Result	Opposition Result	Opposition Result	Opposition Result	Opposition Result	Opposition Result	Opposition Result	Opposition Result	Rank
Lucija Babic	Women's -70 kg	—	Bye	Mitlesh (IND); W 12-00S1	Andrea I. Poo Castrejon (MEX); L 00S1-10S2	—	Bye	April Lynn Fehr (USA); W 12-00	Seongyeon Kim (KOR); L 00-12S1	Did not advance		7
Maja Blagojevic	Women's -63 kg	—	Bye	Alexandra Bryon Barton (FIN); W 11-00S1	Aimi Nouchi (JPN); L 00S2-11	—	Bye	Brigita Mardjonovic (SLO); W 10-00	Iris Iwema (NED); W 01-00	Bye	Nadja Bazynski (GER); L 00-11	5
Sara Matijevic	Women's -48 kg	—	Anne Sophie Jura (BEL); L 00-12	Did not advance								—
Tena Sikic	Women's -57 kg	—	Maayan Greenberg (ISR); W 03S2-01	Lola Marie Ch Benarroche (FRA); L 00S1-10	Bye	—	Anne Sophie Schmidt (GER); L 00S2-12S1	Did not advance				—
Ivana Sutalo	Women's +78 kg	—	Anna Ewa Zaleczna (POL); W 02-00	Gandiimaa Erdenebileg (MGL); W 00S1-00S2	Anne Fatoumata Mbairo (FRA); L 02-11	—	Bye	Jovana Nikic (MNE); W 01S1-00S2	Maiko Inoue (JPN); L 00S1-01	Did not advance		—
Matijevic; Sikic; Blagojevic; Babic; Sulato	Women's Team	—	Bye	Poland (POL); W 3-2	France (FRA); L 0-5	Did not advance						—

== Table Tennis ==
Athlete	Event	Group stage			Round of 128	Round of 64	Round of 32	Round of 16	Quarterfinals	Semifinals	Final / BM	
Athlete	Event	Opposition Result	Opposition Result	Opposition Result	Opposition Result	Opposition Result	Opposition Result	Opposition Result	Opposition Result	Opposition Result	Opposition Result	Rank
Magdalena Basic	Women's Singles	Prasadi M. Rajapaksha Arachchillage (SRI); W 3-0	Danielle Konsbruck (LUX); L 2-3	—		Did not advance						
Ida Jazbec	Women's Singles	Michelle Xin-Ro Liaw (CAN); W 3-0	Anna Pfeffer (AUT); W 3-0	—		Rika Suzuki (JPN); L 1-4	Did not advance					
Sara Mikac	Women's Singles	Liisi Koit (EST); W 3-1	Cristal De Los Meneses Montecinos (CHI); W 3-1	—		Wan Qi Ang (SGP); L 0-4	Did not advance					
Josipa Zajec	Women's Singles	Catherine Simon Spicer (TTO); W 3-0	Jumdaan Enkhbat (MGL); W 3-0	—		Reiko Ikegami (JPN); L 0-4	Did not advance					
Basic/Mikac	Women's Doubles	—				Codina/Iwasa (ARG); L 2-3	Did not advance					
Jazbec/Zajec	Women's Doubles	—				Lo/Liu (HKG); L 2-3	Did not advance					
Basic; Jazbec; Mikac; Zajec	Women's Team	Japan (JPN); L 0-3	Sri Lanka (SRI); W 3-0	United States (USA); L 0-3	—			Did not advance				

== Taekwondo ==
Athlete	Event	Round of 64	Round of 32	Round of 16	Quarterfinals	Semifinals	Final / BM	
Athlete	Event	Opposition Result	Opposition Result	Opposition Result	Opposition Result	Opposition Result	Opposition Result	Rank
Melani Adamic-Golic	Women's +73 kg	—	Emmanuelle Anna Boudreau (CAN); W 10-4	Nafia Kus (TUR); W 5-5	Sara Johanna Zederfeldt (SWE); W 18-3	Aleksandra Kowalczuk (POL); L 1-6	Did not advance	3rd place, bronze medalist(s)
Lovre Brecic	Men's -63 kg	—	Marcos Caballero Echevarri (ESP); W 10-8	Buyanshagai Enkhbold (MGL); W 31-9	Nutthawee Klompong (THA); W 16-7	Lucas Lautaro Guzman (ARG); L 5-19	Did not advance	3rd place, bronze medalist(s)
Luka Horvat	Men's -80 kg	—	Idrees Khan (PAK); W 39-1	Francisco Lucin Dos Santos (BRA); W 32-12	Richard Andre K Ordemann (NOR); L 6-19	Did not advance		
Matea Jelic	Women's -67 kg	—	Bye	Milena Titoneli Guimaraes (BRA); W 16-6	Victoria Catari Heredia Tamez (SWE); L 10-11	Did not advance		
Toni Kanaet	Men's -74 kg	—	Natsagdorj Achitkhuu (MGL); W 29-8	Domen Pirc (SLO); W 22-1	Tsung-Yeh Yang (TPE); L 8-10	Did not advance		
Nives Kerner	Women's -62 kg	—	Evelyn Marta Gonda (HUN); L 12-14	Did not advance				
Katarina Mihaljevic	Women's -73 kg	—	Yann-Yeu Chen (TPE); L 0-20	Did not advance				
Hrvoje Sep	Men's -87 kg	—	Harold Jn Paul (HAI); W 0-WDDR	Batosz Henryk Kolecki (POL); L 14-22	Did not advance			

== Tennis ==
Athlete	Event	Round 1	Round 2	Round 3	Round 4	Quarterfinals	Semifinals	Final / BM	
Athlete	Event	Opposition Score	Opposition Score	Opposition Score	Opposition Score	Opposition Score	Opposition Score	Opposition Score	Rank
Draganja/Draganja	Men's Doubles	DNS	Did not advance						
