= Argentina at the 2017 Summer Universiade =

- IOC code: ARG
- NOC: Argentinian Olympic Committee

in Taipei, Taiwan 19 – 30 August 2017
- Competitors: 178 in 16 sports
- Medals Ranked 53rd: Gold 0 Silver 1 Bronze 0 Total 1

Summer Universiade appearances (overview)
- 1985; 1987; 1989; 1991; 1993; 1995; 1997; 1999; 2001; 2003; 2005; 2007; 2009; 2011; 2013; 2015; 2017; 2019; 2021; 2025; 2027

Argentina participated at the 2017 Summer Universiade in Taipei, Taiwan with 178 competitors in 16 sports.

== Archery ==
Athlete	Event	Ranking round		Round of 48	Round of 32	Round of 16	Quarterfinals	Semifinals	Final / BM	
Athlete	Event	Score	Seed	Opposition Score	Opposition Score	Opposition Score	Opposition Score	Opposition Score	Opposition Score	Rank
Luis Fernando Aguirre Oviedo	Men's Compound Individual	654	47	Yoke Rizaldi Akbar (INA); L 137-141	did not advance					N/A
Juan Ignacio De Martini	Men's Compound Individual	638	50	Che-Wei Lin (TPE); L 143-133	did not advance					N/A
Agustin Melissa Regnasco	Women's Compound Individual	626	50	Ting-Ting Wu (TPE); L 143-132	did not advance					N/A
Santiago Nicola Regnasco	Men's Compound Individual	662	43	Akbarali Karabayev (KAZ); W 146-143	Yaser Amouei (IRI); L 141-137	did not advance				N/A

== Athletics ==
=== Men ===
==== Track Events ====
Athlete	Event	Round 1		Round 2		Semifinal		Final	
Athlete	Event	Result	Rank	Result	Rank	Result	Rank	Result	Rank
Jorge Oscar Caracassis	100m	10.86	6	did not advance					
Matias Exequiel Robledo	100m	10.75	5	did not advance					
Jorge Oscar Caracassis	200m	22.54	7	—N/a		did not advance			
Matias Exequiel Robledo	200m	21.98	6	—N/a		did not advance			
Jaime Rodriguez Baldiviez	400m Hurdles	52.10	4	—N/a		did not advance			
Guillermo Manue Ruggeri	400m Hurdles	50.91	2Q	—N/a		50.54	4	did not advance	

==== Field Events ====
Athlete	Event	Qualification		Final	
Athlete	Event	Distance	Position	Distance	Position
Joaquin Gabriel Gomez	Hammer	63.33	7Q	69.49	9
Carlos Daniel Layoy	High Jump	2.15	2q	2.20	9

=== Women ===
==== Track Events ====
Athlete	Event	Round 1		Round 2		Semifinal		Final	
Athlete	Event	Result	Rank	Result	Rank	Result	Rank	Result	Rank
Noelia Anahi Martinez	200m	24.60	6	—N/a		did not advance			
Noelia Anahi Martinez	400m	55.34	6Q	—N/a		55.66	6	did not advance	
Belen Adaluz Casetta	3000m Steeplechase	—N/a						10:12.77	6

==== Field Events ====
Athlete	Event	Qualification		Final	
Athlete	Event	Distance	Position	Distance	Position
Ailen Armada	Discus	49.54	8	did not advance	
Daniela Ayelen Gomez	Hammer	50.54	9	did not advance	
Valeria Chiaraviglio	Pole Vault	4.00	4Q	4.10	8

==== Combined Events - Heptathlon ====
Athlete	Event	100H	HJ	SP	200 m	LJ	JT	800 m	Final	Rank
Fiorella Chiappe Y Madsen	Result	14.31	1.68	DNS	DNS	DNS	DNS	DNS	DNF	—N/a
Fiorella Chiappe Y Madsen	Points	935	830	DNS	DNS	DNS	DNS	DNS	DNF	—N/a

== Badminton ==
Athlete	Event	Round of 128	Round of 64	Round of 32	Round of 16	Quarterfinal	Semifinal	Final / BM	
Athlete	Event	Opposition Score	Opposition Score	Opposition Score	Opposition Score	Opposition Score	Opposition Score	Opposition Score	Rank
Dino Nicolas DelMastro	Men's Singles	Bye	Panji Akbar Sudrajat (INA); L 0-2	did not advance					36
Fedrico Sebasti Diaz	Men's Singles	Aman Kumar (IND); L 2-0	did not advance						73
Fedrico Sebasti Diaz; Dino Nicolas DelMastro	Men's Doubles	—N/a	Shuhei Ozeki / Sho Kawabata (JPN); L 0-2	did not advance					49

== Basketball ==
=== Men's tournament ===
Preliminary Round

Qualified for the Final eight
Qualified for the 9th-16th place classification playoffs
Qualified for the 17th-24th Classification playoffs

Team	Pld	W	L	PF	PA	PD	Pts
United States	5	5	0	544	330	+214	10
Argentina	5	4	1	433	306	+127	9
Estonia	5	3	2	377	381	−4	8
Czech Republic	5	2	3	391	392	−1	7
Romania	5	1	4	350	408	−58	6
United Arab Emirates	5	0	5	284	562	−278	5

20 August 2017
17:30 (UTC+8)

Report

Argentina	76–89	United States
Scoring by quarter: 14–26, 19–17, 15–27, 28–19

Taipei Arena
Referees: O. Lucis (LAT), A. Davydov (RUS), S. Lee (KOR)

21 August 2017
10:00 (UTC+8)

Report

Czech Republic	49–87	Argentina
Scoring by quarter: 17–14, 11–28, 10–27, 11–18

Taipei Arena
Referees: S. Beliakov (RUS), P. Marques (POR), S. Arisawa (JAP)

23 August 2017
12:30 (UTC+8)

Report

Argentina	78–65	Estonia
Scoring by quarter: 22–17, 18–16, 17–14, 21–18

Taipei Arena
Referees: S. Chebyshev (UKR), J.A. Boyer (AUS), T. Benczur (HUN)

24 August 2017
20:00 (UTC+8)

Report

United Arab Emirates	50–121	Argentina
Scoring by quarter: 10–29, 16–31, 13–36, 11–25

Taipei Heing Basketball Gymnasium
Referees: G. Kapitany (HUN), C.H. Chen (TPE), H.M. Chan (HKG)

25 August 2017
15:00 (UTC+8)

Report

Argentina	71–53	Romania
Scoring by quarter: 15–15, 22–15, 27–13, 7–10

Taipei Heping Basketball Gymnasium
Referees: S. Arisawa (JAP), S.H. Wei (TPE), B.M. Kyambadde (UGA)

Quarterfinals

27 August 2017
17:30 (UTC+8)

Report

Lithuania	72–70	Argentina
Scoring by quarter: 16–24, 20–14, 20–14, 16–18

Taipei Arena
Referees: N. Saunders (CAN), T. Suslov (EST), S. Emlek (TUR)

=== Women's tournament ===
Preliminary Round

Qualified for the Final eight
Qualified for the Placement 9th-16th

Team	Pld	W	L	PF	PA	PD	Pts
Russia	3	3	0	189	167	+22	6
Australia	3	2	1	205	181	+24	5
Lithuania	3	1	2	196	183	+13	4
Argentina	3	0	3	150	209	−59	3

21 August 2017
17:30 (UTC+8)

Report

Russia	67–57	Argentina
Scoring by quarter: 15–19, 12–9, 29–16, 11–13

Hsinchu Municipal Gymnasium
Referees: A.M. Del Col (CAN), J. Smiljanic (SRB), S.H. Wei (TPE)

22 August 2017
17:30 (UTC+8)

Report

Argentina	47–69	Australia
Scoring by quarter: 8–12, 9–18, 14–12, 16–27

University of Taipei (Tianmu) Gymnasium
Referees: T. Suslov (EST), V. Györgyi (NOR), M.L. Sung (TPE)

23 August 2017
17:30 (UTC+8)

Report

Lithuania	73–46	Argentina
Scoring by quarter: 17–6, 6–18, 26–11, 24–11

Taipei Heping Basketball Gymnasium
Referees: S. Emlek (TUR), S. Lee (KOR), H.S. Carrizales (MEX)

9th-16th-place game

25 August 2017
10:00 (UTC+8)

Report

Poland	66–70	Argentina
Scoring by quarter: 15–15, 17–14, 14–24, 20–17

Hsinchu Municipal Gymnasium
Referees: T. Suslov (EST), H.M. Chan (HKG), S.A. Chiau (MOZ)

9th-12th-place game

26 August 2017
15:00 (UTC+8)

Report

Hungary	68–54	Argentina
Scoring by quarter: 16–8, 14–10, 16–12, 22–24

Taipei Heping Basketball Gymnasium
Referees: G.A. Todey (USA), J. Horiuchi (JAP), B.M. Kyambadde (UGA)

11th-place game

28 August 2017
10:00 (UTC+8)

Report

Argentina	89–74	Lithuania
Scoring by quarter: 21–21, 20–26, 26–12, 22–15

Taipei Heping Basketball Gymnasium
Referees: S. Beliakov (RUS), M. Proc (POL), S.H. Wei (TPE)

== Fencing ==
Athlete	Event	Round of 64	Round of 32	Round of 16	Quarterfinal	Semifinal	Final / BM	
Athlete	Event	Opposition Score	Opposition Score	Opposition Score	Opposition Score	Opposition Score	Opposition Score	Rank
Stefano Ivan Lucchetti	Men's Sabre Individual	Sanguk Oh (KOR); L 15-14	did not advance					44
Lucia Ondarts	Women's Foil Individual	Julia Chrzanowska (POL); L 15-7	did not advance					35
Mateo Pettinato	Men's Foil Individual	Pylyp Kolesnikov (UKR); W 15-11	Klod Yunes (UKR); L 15-8	did not advance				32
Stefano Ivan Lucchetti; Mateo Pettinato; Nicolas Marino	Men's Foil Team	—N/a		Russia (RUS); L 45-18	did not advance			12

== Football ==
=== Men's tournament ===
Preliminary Round

Pos	Team	Pld	W	D	L	GF	GA	GD	Pts	Qualification
1	Argentina	3	2	0	1	5	4	+1	6	Elimination round
2	Ukraine	3	2	0	1	4	6	−2	6	Elimination round
3	South Korea	3	1	1	1	8	4	+4	4	Classification round
4	South Africa	3	0	1	2	3	6	−3	1	Classification round

19 August 2017
11:00

South Korea	1–2	Argentina
Jeong 58'	Report	Chiapello 69'; Barbieri Iribe 88'

Chang Gung University Stadium, Taoyuan City
Referee: Hanna Hattab (Syria)
21 August 2017
16:00

South Africa	1–2	Argentina
Sixishe 32' (pen.)	Report	Barbieri Iribe 7', 62'

Chang Gung University Stadium, Taoyuan City
Referee: Hussein Abo Yehia (Lebanon)
23 August 2017
19:30

Ukraine	2–1	Argentina
Kotlyar 16', 58'	Report	Barbieri Iribe 47'

Hsinchu County Second Stadium, Hsinchu County
Referee: Ammar Ebrahim Hasan Mahfoodh (Bahrain)

Quarterfinals

25 August 2017
19:30

France	0–0	Argentina
	Report
Penalties
Sanson (penalty scored); Valera (penalty scored); Denis (penalty scored); Thibault (penalty scored); Cognard (penalty scored)	5–3	(penalty scored) Barbieri Iribe; (penalty scored) Chiapello; (penalty scored) Yorio; (penalty missed) Escalante

New Taipei City Xinzhuang Stadium, New Taipei City
Referee: Sultan Abdulrazzaq Al Marzooqi (United Arab Emirates)

5th-8th Semifinals

27 August 2017
19:30

Argentina	0–4	Russia
	Report	Minayev 32'; Pogorelov 57'; Obolsky 82', 90+1'

Chang Gung University Stadium, Taoyuan City
Referee: Bijan Heidari (Iran)

7th-place game

29 August 2017
19:30

Ukraine	2–0	Argentina
Yakubov 31'; Kotlyar 69'	Report

New Taipei City Xinzhuang Stadium, New Taipei City
Referee: Hanna Hattab (Syria)

=== Women's tournament ===
Preliminary Round

Team	Pld	W	D	L	GF	GA	GD	Pts
United States	3	2	0	1	3	4	−1	6
South Korea	3	1	2	0	6	3	+3	5
Chinese Taipei	3	1	1	1	5	3	+2	4
Argentina	3	0	1	2	2	6	−4	1

18 August 2017
16:00

Chinese Taipei	3–0	Argentina
Chen 4', 61'; Lee 55'	Report

Fu Jen Catholic University Stadium, New Taipei City
Referee: Bùi Thị Thu Trang (Vietnam)
20 August 2017
19:30

South Korea	2–2	Argentina
Son H. 69'; Jang 84'	Report	Spiazzi 3'; Urbani 14'

Hsinchu County Second Stadium, Hsinchu County
Referee: Miss Pansa Chaisanit (Thailand)
22 August 2017
19:30

United States	1–0	Argentina
Bruder 30'	Report

New Taipei City Xinzhuang Stadium, New Taipei City
Referee: Doumouh Al-Bakkar (Lebanon)

9th-13th Place Quarterfinal

24 August 2017
16:00

Argentina	1–6	Great Britain
Urbani 34'	Report	Quinn 17', 24', 74'; Hill 18'; Fergusson 29'; Donovan 49'

Hsinchu County Second Stadium, Hsinchu County
Referee: Trang Bui Thi Thu (Vietnam)

== Golf ==
Athlete	Event	Round 1	Round 2	Round 3	Total	
Athlete	Event	Score	Score	Score	Score	Rank
Joaquin Luis De Aduiriz	Men's Individual	78	77	75	230	45
Juan Ignacio Ficco Villa	Men's Individual	81	83	80	244	=56
Miguel Sancholuz	Men's Individual	72	76	72	220	29
Victoria Leeson	Women's Individual	84	88	84	256	=53
Joaquin Luis De Aduiriz; Juan Ignacio Ficco Villa; Miguel Sancholuz	Men's Team	150	153	147	450	15

== Gymnastics ==
Athlete	Event	Apparatus				Total	Rank
Athlete	Event	V	UB	BB	F	Total	Rank
Tatiana Avila	All-Around	12.300	10.000	9.950	10.350	42.600	41

== Judo ==
=== Men ===
Athlete	Event	Round of 64	Round of 32	Round of 16	Quarterfinals	Repechage 32	Repechage 16	Repechage 8	Final Repechage	Semifinals	Final / BM	
Athlete	Event	Opposition Result	Opposition Result	Opposition Result	Opposition Result	Opposition Result	Opposition Result	Opposition Result	Opposition Result	Opposition Result	Opposition Result	Rank
Habib Salvador Baduy	-100 kg	—N/a	Dylan Van Nuffel (UKR); L 01–10	did not advance								N/A
Alejandro Feder Clara	-73 kg	Bye	Ricardo S. Segovia Collao (CHI); W 01–00S1	Behruzi Khojazoda (TJK); W 00S3–10S2	Reda Bougueroua (ALG); L 10S2–00S3	Bye		Norin Tatarescu (MDA); L 02S1–00	did not advance			N/A
Juan Ignacio Leranoz	-60 kg	—N/a	Yung-Wei Yang (TPE); L 00–11	Bye		—N/a	Adrian Dawid Wala (POL); L 00–01	did not advance				N/A
Tomas Spikermann	-90 kg	Bye	Sid Ali Mechemache (ALG); W 01–11	Davis Duda (LAT); W 01–11	did not advance							N/A
Tomas Spikermann	Open	—N/a	Kamal Islam (PAK); W 00–00	Marko Kumric (CRO); L 00–10	Bye	—N/a	Bye	Musa Tumenov (RUS); L 00S1–11	did not advance			N/A
Joaquin Ignacio Val	-81 kg	Bye	Wei-Cheng Chang (TPE); L 01–13	did not advance								N/A
Leranoz; Clara; Val; Spikermann; Baduy	Team	—N/a	Bye	Korea (KOR); L 5-0	did not advance							N/A

=== Women ===
Athlete	Event	Round of 64	Round of 32	Round of 16	Quarterfinals	Repechage 32	Repechage 16	Repechage 8	Final Repechage	Semifinals	Final / BM	
Athlete	Event	Opposition Result	Opposition Result	Opposition Result	Opposition Result	Opposition Result	Opposition Result	Opposition Result	Opposition Result	Opposition Result	Opposition Result	Rank
Amanda Bredeston	+78 kg	—N/a	Pei-Yu Sun (TPE); L 11–00	did not advance								N/A
Amanda Bredeston	Open	—N/a	Bye	Jiyoun Kim (KOR); L 11–00S1	Bye	—N/a	Bye	Sibilla Mariana Jacinto Daniel (BRA); L 00–10	did not advance			N/A

== Swimming ==
=== Men ===
Athlete	Event	Heat		Semifinal		Final	
Athlete	Event	Time	Rank	Time	Rank	Time	Rank
Guido Alejandro Buscaglia	50m Butterfly	24.67	3	did not advance			
Guido Alejandro Buscaglia	50m Backstroke	26.34	1	did not advance			
Guido Alejandro Buscaglia	100m Freestyle	50.76	4	did not advance			
Guido Alejandro Buscaglia	50m Freestyle	22.58	1Q	22.46	6	did not advance	
Nicolas Deferrari	50m Butterfly	25.10	5	did not advance			
Nicolas Deferrari	200m Individual Medley	2:07.96	2	did not advance			
Nicolas Deferrari	200m Butterfly	2:01.27	1	did not advance			
Nicolas Deferrari	50m Backstroke	26.38	4	did not advance			
Nicolas Deferrari	100m Butterfly	55.26	4	did not advance			
Nicolas Deferrari	50m Freestyle	DNS	N/A	did not advance			
Gabriel Osvaldo Morelli	100m Breaststroke	1:03.65	6	did not advance			
Gabriel Osvaldo Morelli	200m Breaststroke	2:20.39	8	did not advance			
Gabriel Osvaldo Morelli	50m Breaststroke	29.31	8	did not advance			
Joaquin Serra	100m Breaststroke	1:04.12	6	did not advance			
Joaquin Serra	50m Breaststroke	28.92	6	did not advance			
Gabriel Osvaldo Morelli; Guido Alejandro Buscaglia; Joaquin Serra; Nicolas Deferrari	4 × 100 m Medley Relay	3:49.62	3	—N/a		did not advance	

=== Women ===
Athlete	Event	Heat		Semifinal		Final	
Athlete	Event	Time	Rank	Time	Rank	Time	Rank
Olivia Carrizo Kuchen	800m Freestyle	9:14.73	1	did not advance			
Olivia Carrizo Kuchen	400m Freestyle	4:33.79	2	did not advance			
Maria Belen Diaz	50m Butterfly	27.93	8	did not advance			
Maria Belen Diaz	100m Freestyle	58.41	4	did not advance			
Maria Belen Diaz	100m Butterfly	1:02.53	8	did not advance			
Maria Belen Diaz	50m Freestyle	27.06	6	did not advance			
Florencia Panzini	100m Freestyle	1:00.17	4	did not advance			
Florencia Panzini	200m Freestyle	2:08:45	2	did not advance			
Florencia Panzini	50m Freestyle	28.27	8	did not advance			
Fiamma Peroni Malizia	400m Individual Medley	5:12.97	4	did not advance			
Fiamma Peroni Malizia	200m Individual Medley	2:24.41	6	did not advance			
Fiamma Peroni Malizia	100m Butterfly	1:05.48	7	did not advance			
Fiamma Peroni Malizia	200m Freestyle	2:09.82	4	did not advance			
Fiamma Peroni Malizia; Florencia Panzini; Maria Belen Diaz; Olivia Carrizo Kuchen	4 × 100 m Freestyle Relay	3:59.67	2	—N/a		did not advance	
Fiamma Peroni Malizia; Florencia Panzini; Maria Belen Diaz; Olivia Carrizo Kuchen	4 × 200 m Freestyle Relay	8:46.52	7	—N/a		did not advance	

== Table Tennis ==
Athlete	Event	Group stage			Round of 128	Round of 64	Round of 32	Round of 16	Quarterfinals	Semifinals	Final / BM	
Athlete	Event	Opposition Result	Opposition Result	Opposition Result	Opposition Result	Opposition Result	Opposition Result	Opposition Result	Opposition Result	Opposition Result	Opposition Result	Rank
Horacio Cifuentes	Men's Singles	Robyn Kyle Veloso (PHI); W 3-0	Gints Eihmans (LAT); W 3-0	—N/a		Ka Ho Wong (HKG); W 4-3	Il Choe (PRK); L 0-4	Did Not Advance				
Javier Santiago Cillis	Men's Singles	Vildan Gadiev (RUS); L 0-3	Manuel Alfonso Moya Maureira (CHI); L 0-3	—N/a		Did Not Advance						
Juan Manuel Daher	Men's Singles	Chun-Hin Edwin Hung (HKG); L 0-3	Nathan Hunter Hsu (USA); W 3-1	—N/a		Did Not Advance						
Franco Titolo	Men's Singles	Konstantinos Pa Konstantinopoulos (GRE); L 0-3	Gustavo Kenzo Yokota (BRA); L 0-3	—N/a		Did Not Advance						
Matias Mario Waldszan	Men's Singles	Antony Arida (LBN); W 3-2	Ao Alexander Chen (AUT); L 0-3	—N/a		Did Not Advance						
Cifuentes/Daher	Men's Doubles	—N/a			Bye	Kjellson/ Kindbald (SWE); W 3-0	Eihmans/ Maslovs (LAT); W 3-0	Chen/ Chaiang (TPE); L 0-3	Did Not Advance			
Cillis/Waldszan	Men's Doubles	—N/a			Bye	Hung/ Ng (HKG); L 1-3	Did Not Advance					
Cifuentes; Cillis; Daher; Titolo; Waldszan	Men's Team	China (CHN); L 0-3	New Zealand (NZL); W 3-0	Russia (RUS); L 0-3	—N/a			Did Not Advance				
Ana Marta Codina	Women's Singles	Anna Maria Markarian (LBN); W 3-0	Sandra Linnea B Helander (SWE); W 3-0	—N/a		Yue Wu (USA); L 2-4	Did Not Advance					
Agustina Iwasa	Women's Singles	Cheng I Kuok (MAC); W 3-0	Hollie Lau (SWE); W 3-0	—N/a		Karin Adamkova (CZE); L 0-4	Did Not Advance					
Yessica Natalia Siepre Gomez	Women's Singles	Rossalean To (AUS); L 0-3	Chloe Anna Thomas (GBR); L 0-3	—N/a		Did Not Advance						
Codina/Iwasa	Women's Doubles	—N/a				Basic/ Mikac (CRO); W 3-2	Adamkova/ Kucerova (CZE); L 0-3	Did Not Advance				
Codina; Iwasa; Siepre Gomez	Women's Team	DPR Korea (PRK); L 0-3	Kazakhstan (KAZ); L 1-3	Hong Kong (HKG); L 0-3	—N/a			Did Not Advance				
Cifuentes/Codina	Mixed Doubles	—N/a			Bye	Morales/ Abarca (CHI); W 3-0	Reed/ Tsaptsinos (GBR); W 3-0	Jang/ Jeon (KOR); L 0-3	Did Not Advance			
Daher/Iwasa	Mixed Doubles	—N/a			Bye	Yoshimura/ Ando (JPN); L 0-3	Did Not Advance					

== Taekwondo ==
Athlete	Event	Round of 64	Round of 32	Round of 16	Quarterfinals	Semifinals	Final / BM	
Athlete	Event	Opposition Result	Opposition Result	Opposition Result	Opposition Result	Opposition Result	Opposition Result	Rank
Jorge Ernesto Alvarez	Men's -74 kg	Bye	Ramin Hosseingholi Zadeh (IRI); L 3-11	Did Not Advance				
Luciana Angiolillo	Women's -62 kg	—N/a	Angie Paola Guiza Montoya (COL); W 22-12	Xiao Feng (MAC); W 6-3	Jisoo Moon (KOR); L 5-8	Did Not Advance		
Augusto Emmanue Fernandez	Men's -58 kg	Michael Douglas De Lima Rodrigues (BRA); L 10-30	Did Not Advance					
Lucas Lautaro Guzman	Men's -62 kg	Bye	George El Chemali (USA); W 16-7	Oleksandr Khomenko (UKR); W 10-5	Jaroslaw Marek Mecmajer (POL); W 17-3	Lovre Brecic (CRO); W 19-5	Mirhashem Hosseini (IRI); L 5-17	2nd place, silver medalist(s)
Jennifer Solang Navarro	Women's -53 kg	—N/a	Tania Garcia Romero (ESP); L 2-8	Did Not Advance				
Jorge Ezequiel Navarro	Men's -54 kg	—N/a	Sahil Hooda (IND); W 22-11	Cesar Roman Rodriguez (MEX); L 9-25	Did Not Advance			
Luz Rayen Ailin Pisani	Women's -49 kg	—N/a	Serrah John Gaye (FRA); W 21-6	Panipak Wongpattanakit (THA); L 25-5	Did Not Advance			
Guzman; Alvarez; Navarro; Fernandez	Men's Team Kyorugi	Bye	United States (USA); L 16-15	Did Not Advance				
Angiolillo; Navarro; Pisani	Women's Team Kyorugi	Bye	Thailand (THA); L 0-DSQ	Did Not Advance				

== Tennis ==
Athlete	Event	Round 1	Round 2	Round 3	Round 4	Quarterfinals	Semifinals	Final / BM	
Athlete	Event	Opposition Score	Opposition Score	Opposition Score	Opposition Score	Opposition Score	Opposition Score	Opposition Score	Rank
Ignacio Javier Ortega	Men's Singles	Bye	Szymon Walkow (POL); W 2-1	Lucas Poullain (FRA); L 0-2	Did Not Advance				
Ignacio Suanno	Men's Singles Consolation	Bye	Miha Okorn (SLO); L 0-2	Did Not Advance					
Franco Daniel Tamagnone	Men's Singles	Bye	Patrick Thomas Ofner (AUT); L 1-2	Did Not Advance					
Aranguren/Suanno	Men's Doubles	Kellovsky/Vocel (CZE); L 0-2	Did Not Advance	—N/a		Did Not Advance			
Barbara Maria Montiel	Women's Singles	Bye	P. Cheapchangej (THA); L 0-2	Did Not Advance					
Josefina Surraco	Women's Singles	Bye	Danielle Elizabeth Wagland (AUS); L 0-2	Did Not Advance					
Montiel/Surraco	Women's Doubles	Jegiolka/Czarnik (POL); L 0-2	Did Not Advance	—N/a		Did Not Advance			
Aranguren/Surraco	Mixed Doubles	Mutumba/Nabanoba (UGA); W 2-0	Gajewski/Jergiolka (POL); L 0-2	—N/a		Did Not Advance			

== Volleyball ==
=== Men's tournament ===
Preliminary Round

Pos	Team	Pld	W	L	Pts	SW	SL	SR	SPW	SPL	SPR	Qualification
1	Iran	5	5	0	15	15	2	7.500	419	317	1.322	Quarterfinals
2	Argentina	5	4	1	12	13	3	4.333	381	305	1.249	Quarterfinals
3	Switzerland	5	3	2	8	10	9	1.111	447	407	1.098	9th–16th place
4	Canada	5	2	3	6	8	11	0.727	390	426	0.915	9th–16th place
5	Cyprus	5	1	4	3	3	13	0.231	297	394	0.754	17th–22nd place
6	United Arab Emirates	5	0	5	1	4	15	0.267	367	452	0.812	17th–22nd place

Date	Time		Score		Set 1	Set 2	Set 3	Set 4	Set 5	Total	Report
20 Aug	15:00	Argentina	3–0	Switzerland	25–23	25–19	28–26			78–68	P2 P3
21 Aug	18:00	Cyprus	0–3	Argentina	16–25	23–25	10–25			49–75	P2 P3
22 Aug	18:00	Argentina	1–3	Iran	16–25	15–25	25–19	22–25		78–94	P2 P3
24 Aug	13:00	Argentina	3–0	Canada	25–11	25–17	25–15			75–43	P2 P2
25 Aug	15:00	United Arab Emirates	0–3	Argentina	18–25	20–25	13–25			51–75	P2 P3

Quarterfinals

Date	Time		Score		Set 1	Set 2	Set 3	Set 4	Set 5	Total	Report
27 Aug	18:00	Argentina	2–3	Russia	25–22	25–17	23–25	18–25	11–15	102–104	P2 P3

5th-8th-place semifinals

Date	Time		Score		Set 1	Set 2	Set 3	Set 4	Set 5	Total	Report
28 Aug	15:00	Portugal	0–3	Argentina	16–25	14–25	19–25			49–75	P2 P3

5th-place match

Date	Time		Score		Set 1	Set 2	Set 3	Set 4	Set 5	Total	Report
29 Aug	14:00	Argentina	1–3	Brazil	24–26	17–25	25–15	22–25		88–91	P2 P3

=== Women's tournament ===
Preliminary Round

Pos	Team	Pld	W	L	Pts	SW	SL	SR	SPW	SPL	SPR	Qualification
1	Ukraine	3	3	0	9	9	2	4.500	267	216	1.236	Quarterfinals
2	Argentina	3	2	1	5	6	6	1.000	246	243	1.012	Quarterfinals
3	Switzerland	3	1	2	4	6	7	0.857	274	270	1.015	
4	Canada	3	0	3	0	3	9	0.333	236	294	0.803	

Date	Time		Score		Set 1	Set 2	Set 3	Set 4	Set 5	Total	Report
21 Aug	13:00	Argentina	0–3	Ukraine	13–25	20–25	10–25			43–75	P2 P3
22 Aug	13:00	Argentina	3–2	Switzerland	14–25	25–9	25–18	24–26	15–8	103–86	P2 P3
23 Aug	13:00	Canada	1–3	Argentina	22–25	27–25	16–25	17–25		82–100	P2 P3

Quarterfinals

Date	Time		Score		Set 1	Set 2	Set 3	Set 4	Set 5	Total	Report
25 Aug	20:00	Chinese Taipei	3–0	Argentina	25–13	25–15	25–22			75–50	P2 P3

5th-8th-place semifinals

Date	Time		Score		Set 1	Set 2	Set 3	Set 4	Set 5	Total	Report
26 Aug	15:00	Argentina	0–3	Finland	20–25	15–25	21–25			56–75	P2 P3

7th-place match

Date	Time		Score		Set 1	Set 2	Set 3	Set 4	Set 5	Total	Report
27 Aug	15:00	Argentina	2–3	France	25–19	22–25	25–20	18–25	13–15	103–104	P2 P3

== Water Polo ==
=== Men's tournament ===
Preliminary Round

Team	Pld	W	D	L	GF	GA	GD	Pts
Netherlands	3	3	0	0	36	14	+22	6
Italy	3	2	0	1	31	15	+16	4
Australia	3	1	0	2	21	22	-1	2
Argentina	3	0	0	3	13	50	–37	0

18 August 2017; 13:00	Report	Australia	13–6	Argentina	Hsinchu County Natatorium; Referees: Hiroaki Ogino (JPN); Michael Baty (RSA)
18 August 2017; 13:00	Report	Score by quarters: 3–1, 2–1, 3–1, 5–3			Hsinchu County Natatorium; Referees: Hiroaki Ogino (JPN); Michael Baty (RSA)
18 August 2017; 13:00	Report	Trabinger 3	Goals	Olivieri 2	Hsinchu County Natatorium; Referees: Hiroaki Ogino (JPN); Michael Baty (RSA)

20 August 2017; 11:40	Report	Argentina	3–19	Netherlands	Hsinchu County Natatorium; Referees: Damien Taylor (GBR); Hiroaki Ogino (JPN)
20 August 2017; 11:40	Report	Score by quarters: 1–4, 1–3, 0–6, 1–6			Hsinchu County Natatorium; Referees: Damien Taylor (GBR); Hiroaki Ogino (JPN)
20 August 2017; 11:40	Report	three players 1	Goals	Koopman 6	Hsinchu County Natatorium; Referees: Damien Taylor (GBR); Hiroaki Ogino (JPN)

21 August 2017; 11:40	Report	Italy	18–4	Argentina	Hsinchu County Natatorium; Referees: Pascal Bouchez (FRA); Amber Drury (USA)
21 August 2017; 11:40	Report	Score by quarters: 4–1, 6–1, 4–1, 4–1			Hsinchu County Natatorium; Referees: Pascal Bouchez (FRA); Amber Drury (USA)
21 August 2017; 11:40	Report	Di Somma 5	Goals	four players 1	Hsinchu County Natatorium; Referees: Pascal Bouchez (FRA); Amber Drury (USA)

9th–16th Place Quarterfinals

25 August 2017; 13:30	Report	Australia	6–5	Argentina	Hsinchu County Natatorium; Referees: David Couper (NZL); Damien Taylor (GBR)
25 August 2017; 13:30	Report	Score by quarters: 2–1, 2–2, 1–1, 1–1			Hsinchu County Natatorium; Referees: David Couper (NZL); Damien Taylor (GBR)
25 August 2017; 13:30	Report	Reeves 2	Goals	Galimberti 2	Hsinchu County Natatorium; Referees: David Couper (NZL); Damien Taylor (GBR)

13th–16th-place semifinals

27 August 2017; 10:30	Report	Romania	10–5	Argentina	Hsinchu County Natatorium; Referees: Jean-Francois Morisseau (CAN); Igor Virijević (SRB)
27 August 2017; 10:30	Report	Score by quarters: 2–1, 4–0, 1–2, 3–2			Hsinchu County Natatorium; Referees: Jean-Francois Morisseau (CAN); Igor Virijević (SRB)
27 August 2017; 10:30	Report	Fulea 3	Goals	five players 1	Hsinchu County Natatorium; Referees: Jean-Francois Morisseau (CAN); Igor Virijević (SRB)

15th-place match

29 August 2017; 09:00	Report	Chinese Taipei	2–11	Argentina	National Taiwan Sport University Arena; Referees: Maxim Gerasimov (GBR); Jang Shi-young (KOR)
29 August 2017; 09:00	Report	Score by quarters: 0–4, 1–4, 0–2, 1–1			National Taiwan Sport University Arena; Referees: Maxim Gerasimov (GBR); Jang Shi-young (KOR)
29 August 2017; 09:00	Report	Chou, Ko 1	Goals	Olivieri 4	National Taiwan Sport University Arena; Referees: Maxim Gerasimov (GBR); Jang Shi-young (KOR)

=== Women's tournament ===
Preliminary Round

Team	Pld	W	D	L	GF	GA	GD	Pts
United States	5	5	0	0	95	14	+81	10
Italy	5	4	0	1	53	34	+19	8
France	5	3	0	2	43	38	+5	6
Australia	5	2	0	3	47	37	-10	4
Greece	5	1	0	4	22	62	–40	2
Argentina	5	0	0	5	15	80	–65	0

19 August 2017; 11:40	Report	Italy	20–4	Argentina	Taipei Songshan Sports Center Swimming Pool; Referees: Jean-Francois Morisseau (CAN); Chang Wan-yu (TPE)
19 August 2017; 11:40	Report	Score by quarters: 4–1, 5–0, 8–1, 3–2			Taipei Songshan Sports Center Swimming Pool; Referees: Jean-Francois Morisseau (CAN); Chang Wan-yu (TPE)
19 August 2017; 11:40	Report	Damico 4	Goals	four players 1	Taipei Songshan Sports Center Swimming Pool; Referees: Jean-Francois Morisseau (CAN); Chang Wan-yu (TPE)

20 August 2017; 15:40	Report	Argentina	1–19	United States	Taipei Songshan Sports Center Swimming Pool; Referees: Irfan Sadekov (RUS); Marie Deslieres (CAN)
20 August 2017; 15:40	Report	Score by quarters: 0–7, 1–4, 0–7, 0–1			Taipei Songshan Sports Center Swimming Pool; Referees: Irfan Sadekov (RUS); Marie Deslieres (CAN)
20 August 2017; 15:40	Report	Comba 1	Goals	Raney 4	Taipei Songshan Sports Center Swimming Pool; Referees: Irfan Sadekov (RUS); Marie Deslieres (CAN)

22 August 2017; 14:20	Report	France	11–4	Argentina	Taipei Songshan Sports Center Swimming Pool; Referees: Vladimir Gerzanich (RUS); David Couper (NZL)
22 August 2017; 14:20	Report	Score by quarters: 2–0, 5–0, 2–2, 2–2			Taipei Songshan Sports Center Swimming Pool; Referees: Vladimir Gerzanich (RUS); David Couper (NZL)
22 August 2017; 14:20	Report	four players 2	Goals	Comba 3	Taipei Songshan Sports Center Swimming Pool; Referees: Vladimir Gerzanich (RUS); David Couper (NZL)

24 August 2017; 14:20	Report	Greece	8–5	Argentina	Taipei Songshan Sports Center Swimming Pool; Referees: Damien Taylor (GBR); Vladimir Gerzanich (RUS)
24 August 2017; 14:20	Report	Score by quarters: 2–2, 2–0, 2–2, 2–1			Taipei Songshan Sports Center Swimming Pool; Referees: Damien Taylor (GBR); Vladimir Gerzanich (RUS)
24 August 2017; 14:20	Report	Mamoglou, Kontogianni 3	Goals	Comba 2	Taipei Songshan Sports Center Swimming Pool; Referees: Damien Taylor (GBR); Vladimir Gerzanich (RUS)

25 August 2017; 17:00	Report	Australia	22–1	Argentina	Taipei Songshan Sports Center Swimming Pool; Referees: Maxim Gerasimov (GBR); Balazs Szekely (HUN)
25 August 2017; 17:00	Report	Score by quarters: 5–0, 5–0, 8–0, 4–1			Taipei Songshan Sports Center Swimming Pool; Referees: Maxim Gerasimov (GBR); Balazs Szekely (HUN)
25 August 2017; 17:00	Report	Hille 5	Goals	Comba 1	Taipei Songshan Sports Center Swimming Pool; Referees: Maxim Gerasimov (GBR); Balazs Szekely (HUN)

9th-12th-place semifinals

26 August 2017; 12:00	Report	Great Britain	7–4	Argentina	Taipei Songshan Sports Center Swimming Pool; Referees: Stephen O'Brien (IRL); Michael Baty (RSA)
26 August 2017; 12:00	Report	Score by quarters: 2–0, 3–2, 1–2, 1–1			Taipei Songshan Sports Center Swimming Pool; Referees: Stephen O'Brien (IRL); Michael Baty (RSA)
26 August 2017; 12:00	Report	Hesketh 3	Goals	Comba 2	Taipei Songshan Sports Center Swimming Pool; Referees: Stephen O'Brien (IRL); Michael Baty (RSA)

11th-place match

28 August 2017; 10:30	Report	New Zealand	17–2	Argentina	National Taiwan Sport University Arena; Referees: Michael Baty (RSA); Damien Taylor (GBR)
28 August 2017; 10:30	Report	Score by quarters: 2–0, 5–0, 6–2, 4–0			National Taiwan Sport University Arena; Referees: Michael Baty (RSA); Damien Taylor (GBR)
28 August 2017; 10:30	Report	Tobin 3	Goals	Todoroff, Gerschcovsky 1	National Taiwan Sport University Arena; Referees: Michael Baty (RSA); Damien Taylor (GBR)

== Wushu ==
Athlete	Event	Pool Round	
Athlete	Event	Score	Rank
Gaston Ezequiel Rosales	Men's Taolu - Changquan	7.21	16
