= Russia at the 2017 Summer Universiade =

- IOC code: RUS
- NOC: Russian Olympic Committee
- Website: https://www.2017.taipei

in Taipei, Taiwan 18 – 30 August 2017
- Competitors: 348 in 20 sports
- Flag bearer: Ilya Zakharov (opening)
- Medals Ranked 4th: Gold 25 Silver 31 Bronze 38 Total 94

Summer Universiade appearances (overview)
- 1993; 1995; 1997; 1999; 2001; 2003; 2005; 2007; 2009; 2011; 2013; 2015; 2017; 2019; 2021; 2025; 2027

Russia participated at the 2017 Summer Universiade in Taipei, Taiwan. Russia sent a delegation of 348 sportspeople and 169 assistants this time. Of those, 13 athletes were Merited Masters of Sport and 81 world-class Masters of Sport.

== Medals by sport ==
Mixed events (*) are listed as both women and men.

Sport	Men				Women				Grand Total			
Sport	1st place, gold medalist(s)	2nd place, silver medalist(s)	3rd place, bronze medalist(s)	Total	1st place, gold medalist(s)	2nd place, silver medalist(s)	3rd place, bronze medalist(s)	Total	1st place, gold medalist(s)	2nd place, silver medalist(s)	3rd place, bronze medalist(s)	Total
Gymnastics (rhythmic)	0	0	0	0	7	4	2	13	7	4	2	13
Diving	4	2*	1	7	0	2*	2	4	4	3*	3	10
Gymnastics (artistic)	1	1	1	3	2	1	2	5	3	2	3	8
Taekwondo	3	0	2	5	0	0	1	1	3	0	3	6
Swimming	1	2	6	9	1	3	3	7	2	5	9	16
Fencing	2	1	0	3	0	2	1	3	2	3	1	6
Weightlifting	1	2	0	3	0	2	0	2	1	4	0	5
Archery	1	1	1	3	0	1	1	2	1	2	2	5
Volleyball	0	1	0	1	1	0	0	1	1	1	0	2
Tennis	1	0	2	3	0	0	0	0	1	0	2	3
Judo	0	3	5	8	0	0	4	4	0	3	9	12
Wushu	0	2	1	3	0	1	0	1	0	3	1	4
Water polo	0	1	0	1	0	0	0	0	0	1	0	1
Badminton	0	0	1*	1	0	0	1*	1	0	0	1	1
Football	0	0	0	0	0	0	1	1	0	0	1	1
Roller sports	0	0	0	0	0	0	1	1	0	0	1	1
Total	14	16	20	49	10	16	19	44	24	31	38	92

== Medalists ==
Medal	Name	Sport	Event	Date
Gold	Roman Izmailov; Nikita Shleikher	Diving	Men's 10 m synchronized platform	August 20
Gold	Sergey Bida	Fencing	Men's individual épée	August 21
Gold	Lilia Akhaimova; Darya Elizarova; Maria Paseka; Evgenia Shelgunova; Daria Spiridonova	Gymnastics	Women's artistic all-around	August 21
Gold	Boris Krasnov	Taekwondo	Men's –68 kg	August 22
Gold	Anton Bulaev; Alexander Dambaev; Victor Kalashnikov	Archery	Men's compound team	August 23
Gold	Kirill Prokopev	Gymnastics	Men's floor exercise	August 23
Gold	Daria Spiridonova	Gymnastics	Women's uneven bars	August 23
Gold	Maria Baklakova; Anna Egorova; Anastasia Guzhenkova; Arina Openysheva; Valeria Salamatina	Swimming	Women's 4 × 200 m freestyle relay	August 23
Gold	Ilya Zakharov	Diving	Men's 3 m springboard	August 24
Gold	Sergey Bida; Georgiy Bruev; Alan Fardzinov; Dmitriy Gusev	Fencing	Women's individual foil	August 24
Gold	Rafail Ayukaev	Taekwondo	Men's +87 kg	August 24
Gold	Egor Klimonov	Weightlifting	Men's 94 kg	August 24
Gold	Evgeny Kuznetsov; Ilya Zakharov	Diving	Men's 3 m synchronized springboard	August 25
Gold	Aleksandr Sadovnikov	Swimming	Men's 100 m butterfly	August 25
Gold	Rafail Ayukaev; Maksat Allalyev; Bogdan Grechkin; Bulat Magomedov	Taekwondo	Men's team Kyorugi	August 26
Gold	Team Russia	Diving	Men's team classification	August 27
Gold	Yulia Bravikova	Gymnastics	Individual all-around	August 28
Gold	Aslan Karatsev; Richard Muzaev	Tennis	Men's singles	August 28
Gold	Russia women's national volleyball team: Angelina Lazarenko; Natalia Krotkova; Anna Kotikova; Alina Pankova; Kristina Kurnosova; Ekaterina Lyubushkina; Tatiana Yurinskaya; Svetlana Serbina; Viktoria Russu; Daria Ryseva; Elizaveta Kotova; Natalia Malykh	Volleyball	Women's tournament	28 August
Gold	Ekaterina Selezneva	Gymnastics	Individual ball	August 29
Gold	Yulia Bravikova	Gymnastics	Individual clubs	August 29
Gold	Yulia Bravikova	Gymnastics	Individual hoop	August 29
Gold	Yulia Bravikova	Gymnastics	Individual ribbon	August 29
Gold	Vera Biryukova; Daria Gorbacheva; Alexandra Korchagina; Elizaveta Minikhina; Valeriya Osikova; Ralina Rakipova	Gymnastics	Group 3 balls, 2 ropes	August 29
Gold	Vera Biryukova; Daria Gorbacheva; Alexandra Korchagina; Elizaveta Minikhina; Valeriya Osikova; Ralina Rakipova	Gymnastics	Group 5 hoops	August 29
Silver	Maria Baklakova; Anastasia Guzhenkova; Maria Kameneva; Polina Lapshina; Arina Openysheva	Swimming	Women's 4 × 100 m freestyle relay	August 20
Silver	Yana Alborova	Fencing	Women's individual foil	August 21
Silver	Aslan Lappinagov	Judo	Men's welterweight	August 21
Silver	Stanislav Retinsky	Judo	Men's team	August 21
Silver	Andrey Zhilkin	Swimming	Men's 50 m butterfly	August 21
Silver	Maria Kameneva	Swimming	Women's 100 m freestyle	August 22
Silver	Viacheslav Yarkin	Weightlifting	Men's 77 kg	August 22
Silver	Tima Turieva	Weightlifting	Women's 63 kg	August 22
Silver	Vladislav Poliashov	Gymnastics	Men's horizontal bar	August 23
Silver	Lilia Akhaimova	Gymnastics	Women's vault	August 23
Silver	Diana Tontoeva; Maria Vinogradova; Aleksandra Savenkova	Archery	Women's compound team	August 23
Silver	Arsalan Baldanov	Archery	Men's recurve individual	August 24
Silver	Nikita Shleikher; Yulia Timoshinina	Diving	Mixed synchronized 10 m platform	August 24
Silver	Evgeny Kuznetsov	Diving	Men's 3 m springboard	August 24
Silver	Adelya Abdrahkhmanova; Yana Alborova; Irina Elesina; Leyla Pirieva	Fencing	Women's team foil	August 24
Silver	Albert Oguzov; Abdula Abdulzhalilov; Lechi Ediev; Aslan Lappinagov; Stanislav Retinsky; Niyaz Bilalov; Anton Brachev; Musa Tumenov	Judo	Men's heavyweight	August 24
Silver	Rodion Bochkov	Weightlifting	Men's 105 kg	August 24
Silver	Iskander Akhmetov; Askar Khamzin; Grigoriy Semenyuk; Alexander Sirotkin	Fencing	Men's team foil	August 25
Silver	Diana Mstieva	Weightlifting	Women's 90 kg	August 25
Silver	Mikhail Dorinov; Rustam Gadirov; Nikita Korolev; Aleksandr Kudashev; Aleksandr Sadovnikov; Andrey Shabasov; Mikhail Vekovishchev	Swimming	Men's 4 × 100 m medley relay	August 26
Silver	Maria Kameneva	Swimming	Women's 50 m freestyle	August 26
Silver	Team Russia	Diving	Women's team classification	August 27
Silver	Pavel Muratov	Wushu	Men's changquan	August 27
Silver	Sandra Konstantinova	Wushu	Women's changquan	August 27
Silver	Ekaterina Selezneva	Gymnastics	Individual all-around	August 28
Silver	Yulia Bravikova	Gymnastics	Individual ball	August 29
Silver	Ekaterina Selezneva	Gymnastics	Individual hoop	August 29
Silver	Ekaterina Selezneva	Gymnastics	Individual ribbon	August 29
Silver	Russia men's national volleyball team: Evgeny Bannov; Azizbek Ismailov; Vadim Likhosherstov; Bogdan Glivenko; Dmitry Emelianov; Leonid Shchadilov; Anton Botin; Vladimir Shishkin; Dmitry Shcherbinin; Alexey Pluzhnikov; Alexander Boldyrev; Sergey Nikitin	Volleyball	Men's tournament	29 August
Silver	Ilias Khusnutdinov	Wushu	Men's Daoshu / Gunshu	August 29
Silver	Russia men's national water polo team: Kirill Korneev; Nikolay Lazarev; Nikita Dereviankin; Ivan Suchkov; Daniil Merkulov; Dmitry Kholod; Roman Shepelev; Ivan Koptsev; Konstantin Kharkov; Ivan Nagaev; Konstantin Sheikin; Andrey Balakirev; Vitaly Statsenko	Water polo	Men's tournament	30 August
Bronze	Anton Brachev	Judo	Men's heavyweight	August 20
Bronze	Niiaz Bilalov	Judo	Men's light heavyweight	August 20
Bronze	Aleksandra Babintseva	Judo	Women's light heavyweight	August 20
Bronze	Daniil Kazachkov; Ilya Kibartas; Vladislav Poliashov; Kirill Prokopev; Alexey Rostov	Gymnastics	Men's artistic all-around	August 20
Bronze	Andrey Arbuzov; Aleksey Bryansky; Sergey Fesikov; Nikita Korolev; Aleksandr Kudashev; Ernest Maksumov; Elisey Stepanov; Mikhail Vekovishchev	Swimming	Men's 4 × 100 m freestyle relay	August 20
Bronze	Evgeny Kuznetsov	Diving	Men's 1 m springboard	August 21
Bronze	Yulia Tikhomirova; Yulia Timoshinina	Diving	Women's 10 m synchronized platform	August 21
Bronze	Adelya Abdrakhmanova	Fencing	Women's individual foil	August 21
Bronze	Valentina Kostenko	Judo	Women's welterweight	August 21
Bronze	Abdula Abdulzhalilov	Judo	Men's featherweight	August 22
Bronze	Mikhail Vekovishchev	Swimming	Men's 200 m freestyle	August 22
Bronze	Arina Openysheva	Swimming	Women's 100 m freestyle	August 22
Bronze	Anisia Chelokhksaeva	Taekwondo	Women's –57	August 22
Bronze	Lilia Akhaimova	Gymnastics	Women's floor	August 23
Bronze	Maria Paseka	Gymnastics	Women's vault	August 23
Bronze	Albert Oguzov	Judo	Men's bantamweight	August 23
Bronze	Musa Tumenov	Judo	Men's open weight	August 23
Bronze	Anzhela Gasparian	Judo	Women's open weight	August 23
Bronze	Rustam Gadirov	Swimming	Men's 200 m breaststroke	August 23
Bronze	Gulzhigit Kochkorbaev	Taekwondo	Men's –58	August 23
Bronze	Arsalan Baldanov; Galsan Bazarzhapov; Artem Makhnenko	Archery	Men's recurve team	August 24
Bronze	Tuyana Dazhidorzhieva; Elena Osipova; Sayana Tsyrempilova	Archery	Women's recurve team	August 24
Bronze	Maria Polyakova; Elena Chernykh	Diving	Women's 3 metre synchronized springboard	August 24
Bronze	Maria Persidskaya; Galiya Sagitova; Natalia Golomidova; Valentina Kostenko; Tatiana Kovalenko; Aleksandra Babintseva; Anzhela Gasparian; Yulia Lianichenko	Judo	Women's team	August 24
Bronze	Maria Temnikova	Swimming	Women's 200 m breaststroke	August 24
Bronze	Kristina Lysenko	Roller Sports	Women's speed slalom	August 25
Bronze	Roman Larin	Swimming	Men's 200 m backstroke	August 25
Bronze	Arina Openysheva	Swimming	Women's 200 m freestyle	August 25
Bronze	Viacheslav Andrusenko; Ernest Maksumov; Aleksandr Kudashev; Aleksandr Fedorov; Elisey Stepanov; Mikhail Vekovishchev	Swimming	Men's 4 × 200 m freestyle relay	August 25
Bronze	Rafael Kamalov	Taekwondo	Men's –87	August 25
Bronze	Aleksandr Osipenko	Swimming	Men's 400 metre individual medley	August 26
Bronze	Russia women's national football team: Tatyana Shcherbak; Maria Galay; Tatiana Sheikina; Nasiba Gasanova; Anna Cholovyaga; Nadezhda Smirnova; Irina Podshibyakina; Marina Fedorova; Elvira Ziyastinova; Margarita Chernomyrdina; Ksenia Kovalenko; Natalia Sokolova; Viktoria Shkoda; Alena Andreeva; Ksenia Shakhova; Natalia Mashina; Ekaterina Pantyukhina; Ekaterina Morozova; Yulia Grichenko; Marina Kiskonen	Football	Women's tournament	28 August
Bronze	Vera Biryukova; Daria Gorbacheva; Alexandra Korchagina; Elizaveta Minikhina; Valeriya Osikova; Ralina Rakipova	Gymnastics	Group all-around	August 28
Bronze	Roman Safiullin	Tennis	Men's singles	August 28
Bronze	Ali Magomedov	Wushu	Men's sanda 60 kg	August 28
Bronze	Ekaterina Selezneva	Gymnastics	Individual clubs	August 29
Bronze	Rodion Alimov; Alina Davletova	Badminton	Mixed doubles	August 29
Bronze	Team Russia	Tennis	Men's team classification	August 30

== Sportspeople ==
=== Archery ===
Compound

Athlete	Event	Ranking round		1/48 Round	1/24 Round	1/16 Round	1/8 Round	Quarterfinals	Semifinals	Final / BM	
Athlete	Event	Score	Seed	Opposition Score	Opposition Score	Opposition Score	Opposition Score	Opposition Score	Opposition Score	Opposition Score	Rank
Anton Bulaev	Men's compound individual	693	7	—N/a	Bye	Ang (SGP); L 143–145	did not advance				
Alexander Dambaev	Men's compound individual	690	10	—N/a	Bye	Ang (MAS); W 145–137	Ang (SGP); W 145–144	Kim (KOR); L 146–149	did not advance		
Victor Kalashnikov	Men's compound individual	688	12	—N/a	Bye	Hidalgo Ibarra (MEX); W 147–141	Fisher (KAZ); W 141–140	Vavro (CRO); L 142–144	did not advance		
Victor Kalashnikov; Anton Bulaev; Alexander Dambaev	Men's team compound	—N/a					Malaysia (MAS); W 215–207	Indonesia (INA); W 223–213	Mexico (MEX); W 222–214	Iran (IRN); W 232–227	1st place, gold medalist(s)
Aleksandra Savenkova	Women's compound individual	669	27	—N/a	Blewett (GBR); W 141–136	Greenwood (GBR); W 138–135	Shkolna (POL); L 140–143	did not advance			
Diana Tontoeva	Women's compound individual	674	18	—N/a	Ferrua (ITA); W 143–131	Wu (TPE); L 137–143	did not advance				
Maria Vinogradova	Women's compound individual	673	21	—N/a	Borysenko (UKR); W 143–135	Mandhare (IND); L 136–136	did not advance				
Diana Tontoeva; Maria Vinogradova; Aleksandra Savenkova	Women's team compound	—N/a					Singapore (SGP); W 213–195	Mexico (MEX); W 210–206	Turkey (TUR); W 204–197	South Korea (KOR); L 229–232	2nd place, silver medalist(s)
Anton Bulaev; Diana Tontoeva	Mixed compound team	1367	8	Malaysia (MAS); W 151–146	South Korea (KOR); L 148–154	did not advance					

Recurve

Athlete	Event	Ranking round		1/48 Round	1/24 Round	1/16 Round	1/8 Round	Quarterfinals	Semifinals	Final / BM	
Athlete	Event	Score	Seed	Opposition Score	Opposition Score	Opposition Score	Opposition Score	Opposition Score	Opposition Score	Opposition Score	Rank
Arsalan Baldanov	Men's recurve individual	665	6	Bye		Ohi (JPN); W 6–0	Ivanytskyy (UKR); W 6–4	Weckmüller (GER); W 7–3	Kim (KOR); W 6–2	Lee (KOR); L 0–6	2nd place, silver medalist(s)
Galsan Bazarzhapov	Men's recurve individual	653	21	Bye	Strajhar (SLO); W 7–3	Duzelbayev (KAZ); L 3–7	did not advance				
Artem Makhnenko	Men's recurve individual	657	14	Bye	Faldzinski (POL); W 7–3	Weckmüller (GER); L 4–6	did not advance				
Arsalan Baldanov; Galsan Bazarzhapov; Artem Makhnenko	Men's team recurve	—N/a					United States (USA); W 6–0	Mexico (MEX); W 6–2	Chinese Taipei (TPE); L 2–6	Kazakhstan (KAZ); W 5–1	3rd place, bronze medalist(s)
Tuyana Dashidorzhieva	Women's recurve individual	644	9	Bye	Loorents (SWE); W 6–0	Kim (USA); W 6–4	Lei (TPE); L 5–6	did not advance			
Elena Osipova	Women's recurve individual	629	17	Bye	Ayuni (INA); W 6–2	Mirca (MDA); W 6–4	Choi (KOR); W 6–4	Lei (TPE); L 2–6	did not advance		
Sayana Tsyrempilova	Women's recurve individual	634	13	Bye	Quah (SGP); W 6–0	Tukebayeva (KAZ); W 6–0	Peng (TPE); L 0–6	did not advance			
Tuyana Dashidorzhieva; Elena Osipova; Sayana Tsyrempilova	Women's team recurve	—N/a					Philippines (PHI); W 6–0	Mexico (MEX); W 6–0	Chinese Taipei (TPE); L 2–6	Italy (ITA); W 6–0	3rd place, bronze medalist(s)
Arsalan Baldanov; Tuyana Dazhidorzhieva	Mixed recurve team	1309	3	United States (USA); W 6–2	France (FRA); L 2–6	did not advance					

=== Athletics ===
11 athletics were to participate, but Russia did not send any sportsperson in this sport due to the fact that all of them participated under neutral flag at the 2017 World Athletics Championships. Several issues referred to the International University Sports Federation were not resolved.

=== Badminton ===
Athlete	Event	Round of 128	Round of 64	Round of 32	Round of 16	Quarterfinal	Semifinal	Final / BM	
Athlete	Event	Opposition Score	Opposition Score	Opposition Score	Opposition Score	Opposition Score	Opposition Score	Opposition Score	Rank
Pavel Kotsarenko	Men's singles	Bye	Bauer (CAN); W 2–1	Claerbout (FRA); L 0–2	did not advance				
Andrey Parakhodin	Men's singles	Ebayo (UGA); W 2–0	Olekantse (BOT); W 2–1	Phuah (MAS); L 0–2	did not advance				
Dmitry Ryabov	Men's singles	Poon (SGP); L 0–2	did not advance						
Rodion Alimov; Pavel Kotsarenko	Men's doubles	—N/a		Poon / Vighnesh (SGP); W 2–0	Popov / Baures (FRA); W 2–0	Danoa Kuldip Singh / Phuah (MAS); L 0–2	did not advance		
Rodion Kargaev; Vasily Kuznetsov	Men's doubles	—N/a	Chang / Yeung (HKG); L 0–2	did not advance					
Andrey Parakhodin; Dmitry Ryabov	Men's doubles	—N/a	Atilano / Mendes (POR); W 2–1	Kim / Seo (KOR); L 0–2	did not advance				
Elena Komendrovskaya	Women's singles	—N/a	Stankovic (SLO); W 2–0	Kim (KOR); L 0–2	did not advance				
Anastasia Ronzhina	Women's singles	—N/a	Simic (SRB); W 2–0	Lee (TPE); L 0–2	did not advance				
Anastasia Semenova	Women's singles	—N/a	Ho (AUS); W 2–0 ret.	Cheah (MAS); L 0–2	did not advance				
Ekaterina Bolotova; Alina Davletova	Women's doubles	—N/a	Yoon / Lee (KOR); L 0–2	did not advance					
Ksenia Evgenova; Elena Komendrovskaya	Women's doubles	—N/a	Chen / Sporkert (USA); W 2–0	Van der Viver / De Wet (RSA); W 2–0	Hsu / Wu (TPE); L 0–2	did not advance			
Anastasia Ronzhina; Anastasia Semenova	Women's doubles	—N/a		Xu / Xu (RSA); L 0–2	did not advance				
Rodion Alimov; Alina Davletova	Mixed doubles	—N/a		Tong / Lai (CAN); W 2–0	Kim / Lee (KOR); W 2–0	Isriyanet / Muenwong (THA); W 2–0	Wang / Lee (TPE); L 0–2	Did not advance	3rd place, bronze medalist(s)
Vasily Kuznetsov; Ksenia Evgenova	Mixed doubles	—N/a		Szydlowski / Witek (POL); L 0–2	did not advance				
Rodion Kargaev; Ekaterina Bolotova	Mixed doubles	—N/a	Sauk / Lattik (EST); W 2–0	Goh / Ayub (MAS); L 0–2	did not advance				

Athlete	Event	Group Stage				Elimination	Quarterfinal	Semifinal	Final / BM	
Athlete	Event	Opposition Score	Opposition Score	Opposition Score	Rank	Opposition Score	Opposition Score	Opposition Score	Opposition Score	Rank
Rodion Alimov; Rodion Kargaev; Pavel Kotsarenko; Andrey Parakhodin; Dmitry Ryabov; Vasily Kuznetsov; Ekaterina Bolotova; Alina Davletova; Ksenia Evgenova; Elena Komendrovskaya; Anastasia Ronzhina; Anastasia Semenova	Mixed team	Botswana (BOT); W 5–0	United States (USA); W 5–0	—N/a		—N/a	Chinese Taipei (TPE); L 0–3	did not advance		

=== Baseball ===
Group stage

Team	Pld	W	L	RF	RA	Pct
Japan	3	3	0	37	7	1.00
United States	3	2	1	21	16	0.67
Mexico	3	1	2	19	10	0.33
Russia	3	0	3	3	47	0.00

August 20, 2017; 11:00 (UTC+8)	Japan	19–0	Russia	Xinzhuan Baseball Stadium, New Taipei City; Attendance: 300
August 20, 2017; 11:00 (UTC+8)		Boxscore		Xinzhuan Baseball Stadium, New Taipei City; Attendance: 300

August 22, 2017; 18:30 (UTC+8)	Russia	6–10	United States	Xinzhuan Baseball Stadium, New Taipei City; Attendance: 600
August 22, 2017; 18:30 (UTC+8)		Boxscore		Xinzhuan Baseball Stadium, New Taipei City; Attendance: 600

August 23, 2017; 18:30 (UTC+8)	Mexico	15–0	Russia	Xinzhuang Baseball Stadium, New Taipei City; Attendance: 352
August 23, 2017; 18:30 (UTC+8)		Boxscore		Xinzhuang Baseball Stadium, New Taipei City; Attendance: 352

Consolation round

Team	Pld	W	L	RF	RA	Pct
Chinese Taipei	1	1	0	11	1	1.00
France	1	1	0	11	7	1.00
Russia	1	0	1	7	11	0.00
Mexico	1	0	1	1	11	0.00

August 25, 2017; 18:30 (UTC+8)	France	11–7	Russia	Xinzhuang Baseball Stadium, New Taipei City; Attendance: 563
August 25, 2017; 18:30 (UTC+8)		Boxscore		Xinzhuang Baseball Stadium, New Taipei City; Attendance: 563

August 26, 2017; 11:00 (UTC+8)	Chinese Taipei	15–0	Russia	Xinzhuang Baseball Stadium, New Taipei City; Attendance: 5,265
August 26, 2017; 11:00 (UTC+8)		Boxscore		Xinzhuang Baseball Stadium, New Taipei City; Attendance: 5,265

=== Basketball ===
==== Men's tournament ====
Group stage

Team	Pld	W	L	PF	PA	PD	Pts
Lithuania	5	4	1	471	331	+140	9
Israel	5	4	1	464	358	+106	9
Ukraine	5	4	1	412	364	+48	9
Australia	5	3	2	408	380	+28	8
Russia	5	1	4	383	432	−49	6
Mozambique	5	0	5	236	509	−273	5

20 August 2017
20:00 (UTC+8)

Report

Mozambique	52–96	Russia
Scoring by quarter: 8–20, 14–28, 13–21, 17–27
Pts: Bungule; Rebs: Chirindza 7 Asts: Bungule, Faduco 4		Pts: Kurbatov 16; Rebs: Abdulbasirov 10; Asts: Vakulchuk 6

Taipei Heping Basketball Gymnasium
Referees: Tanel Suslov (EST)

21 August 2017
15:30 (UTC+8)

Report

Russia	80–107	Israel
Scoring by quarter: 16–25, 22–31, 25–25, 17–26
Pts: Brykin 16; Rebs: Abdulbasirov 7 Asts: Platunov 5		Pts: Koulechov 18; Rebs: three players 7 Asts: Sharon 9

University of Taipei (Tianmu) Gymnasium
Referees: Grant A. Todey (USA)

23 August 2017
15:00 (UTC+8)

Report

Ukraine	72–65	Russia
Scoring by quarter: 9–14, 24–12, 12–18, 27–21
Pts: Kobets 6 Rebs: Petrov 10; Asts: three players		Pts: Abdulbasirov 8 Rebs: Abdulbasirov 15; Asts: three players

Taipei Heping Basketball Gymnasium
Referees: Paulo Margues (POR)

24 August 2017
12:30 (UTC+8)

Report

Russia	71–89	Australia
Scoring by quarter: 19–25, 17–31, 12–14, 23–19
Pts: Abdulbasirov 6 Rebs: Abdulbasirov 10; Asts: three players		Pts: Vasiljevic 9 Rebs: Gak 11; Asts: Naar 8

Taipei Arena
Referees: Leonardo Zalazar (ARG)

25 August 2017
17:30 (UTC+8)

Report

Lithuania	112–71	Russia
Scoring by quarter: 31–18, 30–11, 24–24, 27–18
Pts: Miniotas 7 Rebs: Geben; Asts: Zemaitis 5		Pts: Abdulbasirov 8 Rebs: Abdulbasirov 4 Asts: Mitusov 5

University of Taipei (Tianmu) Gymnasium
Referees: Valenzuela Felipe (CHI)

Classification rounds

27 August 2017
12:30 (UTC+8)

Report

Russia	116–55	United Arab Emirates
Scoring by quarter: 32–15, 32–14, 22–15, 30–13
Pts: Kurbatov 9 Rebs: Kurbatov 12; Asts: Platunov 6		Pts: Khamis 6 Rebs: Albreiki 6 Asts: Khamis, Mohammad 3

Taipei Heping Basketball Gymnasium
Referees: Seungmu Lee (KOR)

==== Women's tournament ====
Group stage

Team	Pld	W	L	PF	PA	PD	Pts
Russia	3	3	0	189	167	+22	6
Australia	3	2	1	205	181	+24	5
Lithuania	3	1	2	196	183	+13	4
Argentina	3	0	3	150	209	−59	3

21 August 2017
17:30 (UTC+8)

Report

Russia	67–57	Argentina
Scoring by quarter: 15–19, 12–9, 29–16, 11–13
Pts: three players 15; Rebs: Riabova, Kuzmina 8 Asts: Bratchikova 5		Pts: Sancisi 21; Rebs: Mungo 7 Asts: Sancisi 3

Hsinchu Municipal Gymnasium
Referees: Anna Maria Del Col (CAN)

22 August 2017
15:00 (UTC+8)

Report

Lithuania	52–59	Russia
Scoring by quarter: 11–11, 10–14, 14–17, 17–17
Pts: Mizgeryte, Belickayte 10; Rebs: Knyzaite 7 Asts: eight players 1		Pts: Gladkova 16; Rebs: Gladkova 10; Asts: Gladkova 6

University of Taipei (Tianmu) Gymnasium
Referees: Paulo Marques (POR)

23 August 2017
12:30 (UTC+8)

Report

Russia	63–58	Australia
Scoring by quarter: 17–17, 12–14, 14–10, 20–17
Pts: Gladkova 27; Rebs: Gladkova 11; Asts: Safonova 27		Pts: Wilson 15; Rebs: Garbin 11; Asts: Wallace 6

Taipei Heping Basketball Gymnasium
Referees: Grant A. Todey (USA)

Quarterfinals

25 August 2017
20:00 (UTC+8)

Report

Russia	69–54	Czech Republic
Scoring by quarter: 23–11, 15–17, 18–16, 13–9
Pts: Ryabova, Gladkova 20; Rebs: Gladkova 10; Asts: Ryabova 3		Pts: Hoskova 16; Rebs: Mainclova 7 Asts: three players

Taipei Arena
Referees: Jonathan Chapman

Semifinals

26 August 2017
20:00 (UTC+8)

Report

Japan	84–63	Russia
Scoring by quarter: 22–12, 22–15, 20–19, 20–17
Pts: Hayashi 8 Rebs: four players Asts: Yasuma 6		Pts: Gladkova 8 Rebs: Gladkova 8 Asts: Bratchikova 3

Taipei Arena
Referees: Nathaniel Saunders (CAN)

Bronze medal game

28 August 2017
17:30 (UTC+8)

Report

Chinese Taipei	81–66	Russia
Scoring by quarter: 16–15, 17–20, 27–16, 21–15
Pts: Chen 9 Rebs: Wang 8 Asts: Lin 6		Pts: Gladkova 10; Rebs: Gladkova 10; Asts: Safonova 5

Taipei Arena
Referees: Anna Maria del Col (CAN)

=== Diving ===
Men

Athlete	Event	Preliminaries		Semifinals		Final	
Athlete	Event	Points	Rank	Points	Rank	Points	Rank
Aleksandr Bondar	1 m springboard	355.00	10 Q	did not advance			13
Evgeny Kuznetsov	1 m springboard	400.95	1 QF	Bye		434.20	3rd place, bronze medalist(s)
Nikita Shleikher	1 m springboard	375.20	5 SB	371.25	4	Did not advance	10
Evgeny Kuznetsov	3 m springboard	386.75	11 Q	461.65	2 Q	500.75	2nd place, silver medalist(s)
Ilya Zakharov	3 m springboard	453.35	1 Q	479.40	1 Q	533.00	1st place, gold medalist(s)
Nikita Shleikher	3 m springboard	362.95	18	did not advance			20
Aleksandr Bondar	10 m platform	437.55	3	400.80	10	471.70	4
Roman Izmailov	10 m platform	383.00	11	did not advance			18
Nikita Shleikher	10 m platform	413.20	7	451.50	5	434.75	7
Evgeny Kuznetsov; Ilya Zakharov	3 m synchronized springboard	—N/a				428.07	1st place, gold medalist(s)
Roman Izmailov; Nikita Shleikher	10 m synchronized platform	—N/a				411.99	1st place, gold medalist(s)

Women

Athlete	Event	Preliminaries		Semifinals		Final	
Athlete	Event	Points	Rank	Points	Rank	Points	Rank
Olga Kulemina	1 m springboard	245.20	10	did not advance			13
Ekaterina Nekrasova	1 m springboard	246.80	8	226.00	5	Did not advance	12
Maria Polyakova	1 m springboard	264.65	1 QF	Bye		267.70	4
Elena Chernykh	3 m springboard	262.65	11 Q	271.95	6 Q	287.85	7
Olga Kulemina	3 m springboard	262.05	12 Q	241.40	13	Did not advance	13
Ekaterina Nekrasova	3 m springboard	221.65	24	did not advance			23
Yulia Tikhomirova	10 m platform	224.95	16 Q	247.20	13 R	Did not participate	13
Yulia Timoshina	10 m platform	271.35	8 Q	275.65	8 Q	306.45	6
Elena Chernykh; Maria Polyakova	3 m synchronized springboard	—N/a				270.30	3rd place, bronze medalist(s)
Yulia Tikhomirova; Yulia Timoshina	10 m synchronized platform	—N/a				263.07	3rd place, bronze medalist(s)

Mixed

Athlete	Event	Final	
Athlete	Event	Points	Rank
Aleksandr Bondar; Ekaterina Nekrasova	Mixed team	337.05	7
Viktor Minibaev; Maria Polyakova	3 m synchronized springboard	266.49	6
Nikita Shleikher; Yulia Timoshina	10 m synchronized platform	304.80	2nd place, silver medalist(s)

Team classification

Team	Points	Rank
Men's	3761.23	1st place, gold medalist(s)
Women's	2519.99	2nd place, silver medalist(s)

Qualification legend: QF – Qualify to final; SA – Qualify to Semifinal Group A; SB – Qualify to Semifinal Group B

=== Fencing ===
Men

Athlete	Event	Round of 128	Round of 64	Round of 32	Round of 16	Quarterfinal	Semifinal	Final / BM	
Athlete	Event	Opposition Score	Opposition Score	Opposition Score	Opposition Score	Opposition Score	Opposition Score	Opposition Score	Rank
Sergey Bida	Épée	Bye	Kurbanov (KAZ); W 15–12	Bonnaire (FRA); W 15–12	Jang (KOR); W 14–13	Vuorinen (FIN); W 15–9	Broniszewski (POL); W 15–5	Bányai (HUN); W 15–11	1st place, gold medalist(s)
Georgiy Bruev	Épée	did not advance							77
Alan Fardzinov	Épée	Bye	Turnau (EST); L 10–12	did not advance					38
Dmitriy Gusev	Épée	Bye	Stankevych (UKR); W 15–9	Yamada (JPN); L 8–15	did not advance				28
Sergey Bida; Georgiy Bruev; Alan Fardzinov; Dmitriy Gusev	Team épée	—N/a			Italy (ITA); W 45–40	Kazakhstan (KAZ); W 44–37	Japan (JPN); W 31–30	Hungary (HUN); W 31–30	1st place, gold medalist(s)
Iskander Akhmetov	Foil	—N/a	Bye	Tofalides (CYP); L 13–15	did not advance				20
Askar Khamzin	Foil	—N/a	Nagle (AUS); W 15–8	Ha (KOR); L 12–15	did not advance				27
Grigoriy Semenyuk	Foil	—N/a	Chang (USA); W 15–8	Dósa (HUN); W 15–8	Sirotkin (RUS); L 8–15	did not advance			15
Alexander Sirotkin	Foil	—N/a	Bye	Lee (KOR); W 15–9	Semenyuk (RUS); W 15–8	Chuchukalo (UKR); L 10–15	did not advance		6
Iskander Akhmetov; Askar Khamzin; Grigoriy Semenyuk; Alexander Sirotkin	Team foil	—N/a			Argentina (ARG); W 45–18	South Korea (KOR); W 42–41	Ukraine (UKR); W 45–42	Japan (JPN); L 38–45	2nd place, silver medalist(s)
Andrey Gladkov	Sabre	—N/a	Iliász (HUN); W 15–14	Patrice (FRA); L 13–14	did not advance				32
Anatoliy Kostenko	Sabre	—N/a	Bye	Senegas (FRA); W 15–9	Streets (JPN); W 15–14	Fotouhi (IRN); L 13–15	did not advance		6
Ilya Motorin	Sabre	—N/a	Crutu (ROU); W 15–9	Shirshov (RUS); W 15–8	Gu (KOR); L 9–15	did not advance			13
Vasiliy Shirshov	Sabre	—N/a	Novriansyah (IND); W 15–5	Motorin (RUS); L 8–15	did not advance				22
Andrey Gladkov; Anatoliy Kostenko; Ilya Motorin; Vasiliy Shirshov	Team sabre	—N/a			India (IND); W 45–15	France (FRA); W 45–44	Iran (IRN); L 41–45	Italy (ITA); L 32–45	4

Women

Athlete	Event	Round of 128	Round of 64	Round of 32	Round of 16	Quarterfinal	Semifinal	Final / BM	
Athlete	Event	Opposition Score	Opposition Score	Opposition Score	Opposition Score	Opposition Score	Opposition Score	Opposition Score	Rank
Violetta Khrapina	Épée	Bye	Lichagina (RUS); W 5–3	Stähli (SUI); L 14–15	did not advance				30
Alena Komarova	Épée	Bye	Zamachowska (POL); L 11–15	did not advance					46
Yulia Lichagina	Épée	Bye	Khrapina (RUS); L 3–5	did not advance					35
Irina Okhotnikova	Épée	Bye	Tătăran (ROU); W 15–14	Nixon (USA); L 12–15	did not advance				31
Violetta Khrapina; Alena Komarova; Yulia Lichagina; Irina Okhotnikova	Team épée	—N/a			Sweden (SWE); W 45–17	Poland (POL); L 40–41	did not advance		
Adelya Abdrahkhmanova	Foil	—N/a		Rancurel (FRA); W 15–12	Lupkovics (HUN); W 15–10	Elesina (RUS); W 15–6	Alborova (RUS); L 13–15	—N/a	3rd place, bronze medalist(s)
Yana Alborova	Foil	—N/a		Pirieva (RUS); W 15–13	Miyawaki (JPN); W 15–12	Cheung (HKG); W 15–9	Abdrahkhmanova (RUS); W 15–13	Kreiss (HUN); L 7–15	2nd place, silver medalist(s)
Irina Elesina	Foil	—N/a		Kano (MAC); W 15–12	Wohlgemuth (AUT); W 15–5	Abdrahkhmanova (RUS); L 6–15	did not advance		8
Leyla Pirieva	Foil	—N/a	Chen (TPE); W 15–6	Alborova (RUS); L 13–15	did not advance				27
Adelya Abdrahkhmanova; Yana Alborova*; Irina Elesina; Leyla Pirieva	Team foil	—N/a				South Korea (KOR); W 45–38	Poland (POL); W 40–39	Italy (ITA); L 25–45	2nd place, silver medalist(s)
Anastasia Bazhenova	Sabre	—N/a	Barzegar (IRN); W 15–10	Sazanjian (IRN); W 15–14	Hwang (KOR); L 6–15	did not advance			16
Olga Nikitina	Sabre	—N/a	Bye	Chamberlain (USA); W 15–13	Fukushima (JPN); W 15–8	Emura (JPN); L 10–15	did not advance		6
Yulia Obvintseva	Sabre	—N/a	Bye	Kaspiarovich (BLR); W 15–9	Ciaraglia (ITA); L 11–15	did not advance			15
Svetlana Sheveleva	Sabre	—N/a	Yoon (KOR); L 13–15	did not advance					39
Anastasia Bazhenova; Olga Nikitina; Yulia Obvintseva; Svetlana Sheveleva	Team sabre	—N/a			India (IND); W 45–30	Hungary (HUN); L 32–45	did not advance		

=== Football ===
==== Men's tournament ====
Group stage

Pos	Team	Pld	W	D	L	GF	GA	GD	Pts	Qualification
1	Russia	3	3	0	0	14	2	+12	9	Elimination round
2	Italy	3	2	0	1	4	3	+1	6	Elimination round
3	Brazil	3	1	0	2	7	5	+2	3	Classification round
4	United States	3	0	0	3	0	15	−15	0	Classification round

18 August 2017
19:30
(UTC+08:00)

Brazil	2–3	Russia
De Pauli 79' (pen.); Rodrigues dos Reis 88'	Report	Sergeyev 15'; Ustinov 68'; Ivashchenko 90+5'

Hsinchu County Second Stadium, Hsinchu County
Referee: Takuto Okabe (Japan)

21 August 2017
19:30
(UTC+08:00)

Italy	0–3	Russia
	Report	36', 40' Sergeev; 66' Obolsky

Hsinchu County Second Stadium, Hsinchu County
Referee: Pranjal Banerjee (India)

23 August 2017
16:00
(UTC+08:00)

Russia	8–0	United States
Ivashchenko 6', 72'; Mullin 12', 30'; Minaev 36'; Pogorelov 66', 87'; Sergeev 89'	Report

Hsinchu County Second Stadium, Hsinchu County
Referee: Mongkolchai Pechsri (Thailand)

Quarterfinals

25 August 2017
19:30

Uruguay	1–0	Russia
Oyenard Dupuy 76'	Report

Hsinchu County Second Stadium, Hsinchu County
Referee: Sivakorn Pu-Udom (Thailand)

==== Women's tournament ====
Group stage

Team	Pld	W	D	L	GF	GA	GD	Pts
Russia	2	2	0	0	3	1	+2	6
South Africa	2	1	0	1	3	2	+1	3
Great Britain	2	0	0	2	2	5	−3	0

20 August 2017
19:30
(UTC+08:00)

Russia	1–0	South Africa
Kovalenko 16'	Report

New Taipei City Xinzhuang Stadium, New Taipei City
Referee: Thi Dung Cong

22 August 2017
16:30
(UTC+08:00)

Russia	2–1	Great Britain
Chernomyrdina 54'; Pantiukhina 75' (pen.)	Report	64' (pen.) Evans

Hsinchu County Second Stadium, Hsinchu County
Referee: Hyeon Jeong Oh (KOR)

Quarterfinals

24 August 2017
19:30

South Korea	0–0	Russia
Penalties
Chang Jang (penalty scored); Seong Mi Kim (penalty scored); Chae Rin Han (penalty scored); Hye In Kim (penalty scored); Mi Yeon Kim (penalty missed)	4–5	(penalty scored) Cholovyaga; (penalty scored) Chernomyrdina; (penalty scored) Fedorova; (penalty scored) Smirnova; (penalty scored) Pantyukhina

New Taipei City Xinzhuang Stadium, New Taipei City

Semifinals

26 August 2017
19:30

Russia	0–1	Brazil
	Report	29' Giovanna De Oliveira

Fu Jen Catholic University Stadium, New Taipei City
Referee: Yoshimi Yamashita (JPN)

Bronze medal game

28 August 2017
16:00

South Africa	0–5	Russia (bronze)
	Report	50' (pen.), 65' Pantyukhina; 53' Mashina; 77' Fedorova; 88' Shkoda

Fu Jen Catholic University Stadium, New Taipei City
Referee: Asaka Matsushita (JPN)

=== Golf ===
Athlete	Event	Round 1	Round 2	Round 3	Total		
Athlete	Event	Score	Score	Score	Score	Par	Rank
Georgy Chernov	Men's individual	88	84	79	251	+35	60
David Nagiev	Men's individual	75	76	82	223	+17	48
Samuel Perelzweig	Men's individual	81	72	78	231	+15	46
Georgy Chernov; David Nagiev; Samuel Perelzweig	Men's team	156	148	157	461	—N/a	17
Sofia Anokhina	Women's individual	77	76	73	226	+10	22
Ekaterina Karaseva	Women's individual	83	82	79	244	+28	47
Sofya Morozova	Women's individual	82	86	79	247	+31	49
Sofia Anokhina; Ekaterina Karaseva; Sofya Morozova	Women's team	159	158	152	469	—N/a	14

=== Gymnastics ===
==== Artistic gymnastics ====
Men
Team

Athlete	Event	Final							
Athlete	Event	Apparatus						Total	Rank
Athlete	Event	F	PH	R	V	PB	HB	Total	Rank
Daniil Kazachkov	Team	14.000	—N/a	14.750	15.050	12.080	13.900	69.500	46
Ilya Kibartas	Team	13.100	13.300	14.900	14.050	13.200	14.050	82.600	7
Vladislav Poliashov	Team	—N/a	11.150	—N/a		15.000	14.550	40.700	89
Kirill Prokopev	Team	14.700	14.200	13.600	14.200	—N/a		56.700	66
Alexey Rostov	Team	13.050	13.550	14.500	14.100	12.550	14.200	81.950	10
Total	Team	41.800	41.050	44.150	42.350	41.000	42.800	253.150	3rd place, bronze medalist(s)

Individual finals

Athlete	Event	Apparatus						Total	Rank
Athlete	Event	F	PH	R	V	PB	HB	Total	Rank
Daniil Kazachkov	Floor	14.183	—N/a					14.183	6
Daniil Kazachkov	Rings	—N/a		14.766	—N/a			14.766	4
Ilya Kibartas	All-around	13.400	12.025	14.600	13.100	12.400	13.850	79.375	16
Ilya Kibartas	Rings	—N/a		14.766	—N/a			14.766	4
Viacheslav Poliashov	Parallel bars	—N/a				14.908	—N/a	14.908	5
Viacheslav Poliashov	Horizontal bar	—N/a					14.100	14.100	2nd place, silver medalist(s)
Kirill Prokopev	Floor	14.800	—N/a					14.800	1st place, gold medalist(s)
Kirill Prokopev	Pommel horse	—N/a	14.066	—N/a				14.066	6
Alexey Rostov	All-around	13.650	13.600	14.650	14.250	14.350	14.250	84.750	4
Alexey Rostov	Horizontal bar	—N/a					13.733	13.733	4

Women
Team

Athlete	Event	Final					
Athlete	Event	Apparatus				Total	Rank
Athlete	Event	V	UB	BB	F	Total	Rank
Lilia Akhaimova	Team	14.450	—N/a	12.300	13.600	40.350	46
Darya Elizarova	Team	—N/a	12.850	12.600	13.850	39.300	48
Maria Paseka	Team	15.000	12.700	—N/a		27.700	55
Evgenia Shelgunova	Team	13.500	13.650	13.500	12.200	52.850	6
Daria Spiridonova	Team	13.650	13.900	13.250	12.700	53.500	4
Total	Team	43.100	40.400	39.350	40.150	163.000	1st place, gold medalist(s)

Individual finals

Athlete	Event	Apparatus				Total	Rank
Athlete	Event	F	V	UB	BB	Total	Rank
Lilia Akhaimova	Floor	13.533	—N/a			13.533	3rd place, bronze medalist(s)
Lilia Akhaimova	Vault	—N/a	13.983	—N/a		13.983	2nd place, silver medalist(s)
Daria Elizarova	Floor	11.800	—N/a			11.800	7
Maria Paseka	Vault	—N/a	13.916	—N/a		13.916	3rd place, bronze medalist(s)
Evgenia Shelgunova	All-around	13.850	13.900	13.600	12.850	54.200	4
Evgenia Shelgunova	Balance beam	—N/a			13.366	13.366	4
Evgenia Shelgunova	Uneven bars	—N/a		13.800	—N/a	13.800	5
Daria Spiridonova	All-around	13.650	14.450	12.200	11.400	51.700	8
Daria Spiridonova	Balance beam	—N/a			12.533	12.533	8
Daria Spiridonova	Uneven bars	—N/a		14.233	—N/a	14.233	1st place, gold medalist(s)

==== Rhythmic gymnastics ====
Athlete	Event	Final & Qualification					
Athlete	Event	Hoop	Ball	Clubs	Ribbon	Total	Rank
Yulia Bravikova	All-around	19.000	17.350	18.575	16.275	71.200	1st place, gold medalist(s)
Yulia Bravikova	Ball	—N/a	16.750	—N/a		16.750	2nd place, silver medalist(s)
Yulia Bravikova	Hoop	18.450	—N/a			18.450	1st place, gold medalist(s)
Yulia Bravikova	Clubs	—N/a		17.900	—N/a	17.900	1st place, gold medalist(s)
Yulia Bravikova	Ribbon	—N/a			16.550	16.550	1st place, gold medalist(s)
Ekaterina Selezneva	All-around	17.750	17.975	16.900	16.550	69.175	2nd place, silver medalist(s)
Ekaterina Selezneva	Ball	—N/a	17.000	—N/a		17.000	1st place, gold medalist(s)
Ekaterina Selezneva	Hoop	17.600	—N/a			17.600	2nd place, silver medalist(s)
Ekaterina Selezneva	Clubs	—N/a		16.100	—N/a	16.100	3rd place, bronze medalist(s)
Ekaterina Selezneva	Ribbon	—N/a			14.950	14.950	2nd place, silver medalist(s)

Athlete	Event	Final & Qualification			
Athlete	Event	5 hoops	3 balls 2 ropes	Total	Rank
Vera Biryukova; Daria Gorbacheva; Alexandra Korchagina; Elizaveta Minikhina; Valeriya Osikova; Ralina Rakipova	Team	15.000	16.350	31.350	3rd place, bronze medalist(s)
Vera Biryukova; Daria Gorbacheva; Alexandra Korchagina; Elizaveta Minikhina; Valeriya Osikova; Ralina Rakipova	5 hoops	17.525	—N/a	17.525	1st place, gold medalist(s)
Vera Biryukova; Daria Gorbacheva; Alexandra Korchagina; Elizaveta Minikhina; Valeriya Osikova; Ralina Rakipova	3 balls, 2 ropes	—N/a	17.450	17.450	1st place, gold medalist(s)

=== Judo ===
Men

Athlete	Event	1/32 Final	1/16 Final	1/8 Final	Quarterfinals	Semifinals	Repechage	Final of Repechage	Final / BM	
Athlete	Event	Opposition Result	Opposition Result	Opposition Result	Opposition Result	Opposition Result	Opposition Result	Opposition Result	Opposition Result	Rank
Musa Tumenov	Open weight	—N/a	Smith III (USA); W 01–00s1	Daković (MNE); W 10–00s3	Kumrić (CRO); L 00s2–00s1	—N/a	Spikermann (ARG); W 11–00s1	Chen (TPE); W 10–00	Orazbayev (KAZ); W 11s1–00s2	3rd place, bronze medalist(s)
Albert Oguzov	–60 kg	—N/a	Bye	Kim (KOR); W 01–00	Fujisaka (JPN); L 00–11	—N/a	Morgoyev (UKR); W 13s1–00	Dimarca (BEL); W 10–00	Yang (TPE); W 10–00	3rd place, bronze medalist(s)
Abdula Abdulzhalilov	–66 kg	Zavadil (CZE); W 11s1–00s1	Zehir (TUR); W 12–00	Singh (IND); W 10–00	Isoda (JPN); L 00s1–01s1	—N/a	Fuzita (BRA); W 02s1–00	Tiefgraber (AUT); W 01–00	Kyrgyzbaev (KAZ); W 01s1–00	3rd place, bronze medalist(s)
Lechi Ediev	–73 kg	Lee (TPE); W 11–00	Khojazoda (TJK); L 00–01	did not advance						
Aslan Lappinagov	–81 kg	—N/a	Fujiwara (JPN); W 01s1–00s1	Pierre (FRA); W 10–00	Taranto Panini (BRA); W 02–00s1	Petr (CZE); W 11–00s1	Bye		Lee (KOR); L 00–01s2	2nd place, silver medalist(s)
Stanislav Retinsky	–90 kg	Nenartavičius (LTU); W 10s1–00s3	Diesse (FRA); W 10–00s2	Krizsán (HUN); W 10–00	Kuusik (EST); W 01s1–00s2	Zakariyayev (KAZ); W 01s1–00s2	Bye		Gwak (KOR); L 00s2–01s1	2nd place, silver medalist(s)
Niyaz Bilalov	–100 kg	—N/a	Bye	Van Nuffel (BEL); W 10–00	Hutsol (UKR); W 10–00	Kotsoiev (AZE); L 00s1–11s1	Bye		Domanski (POL); W 12–00	3rd place, bronze medalist(s)
Anton Brachev	+100 kg	—N/a	Sajjadi Fard (IRN); W 11–00s1	Valizadeh Soofiani (USA); W 10–00	Bouizgarne (GER); W 10–00s2	Kageura (JPN); L 00s1–00	Bye		Grabowski (POL); W 10s1–00	3rd place, bronze medalist(s)
Albert Oguzov*; Abdula Abdulzhalilov; Lechi Ediev; Aslan Lappinagov; Stanislav Retinsky; Niyaz Bilalov; Anton Brachev*; Musa Tumenov*	Team	—N/a	Bye	Estonia (EST); W 5–0	Poland (POL); W 5–0	Brazil (BRA); W 4–1	—N/a	Bye	Japan (JPN); L 1–4	2nd place, silver medalist(s)

Women

Athlete	Event	1/32 Final	1/16 Final	1/8 Final	Quarterfinals	Semifinals	Repechage	Final of Repechage	Final / BM	
Athlete	Event	Opposition Result	Opposition Result	Opposition Result	Opposition Result	Opposition Result	Opposition Result	Opposition Result	Opposition Result	Rank
Anzhela Gasparian	Open weight	—N/a	Bye	Erdenebileg (MGL); W 01–00	Załęczna (POL); W 10–00	Kim (KOR); L 00s1–11	—N/a		Kyrychenko (UKR); W 11–00s1	3rd place, bronze medalist(s)
Maria Persidskaya	–48 kg	—N/a	Gao (TPE); W 01–00s1	Shmal (UKR); W 00–00s2	Ganbaatar (MGL); W 13s1–00s1	Chibana (BRA); L 00s2–02s1	—N/a		Galbadrakh (KAZ); L 00s3–10s2	4
Natalia Golomidova	–57 kg	—N/a	León (MEX); W 01s1–00s1	Kwon (KOR); L 00–11	—N/a		Michailova (LTU); W 02–01s1	Nicolaescu (ROU); W 11–00s1	Murai (JPN); L 00s2–10	4
Valentina Kostenko	–63 kg	—N/a	Heyns (BEL); W 11s1–00	Iwema (NED); W 12–01	Giorgis (ITA); W 10–00	Nouchi (JPN); L 00s2–02s1	Bye		Shevchenko (UKR); W 01–00s1	3rd place, bronze medalist(s)
Tatiana Kovalenko	–70 kg	—N/a	Podelenczki (ROU); L 00s3–10	did not advance						
Aleksandra Babintseva	–78 kg	—N/a	Bye	Kułaga (POL); W 10–00	Marín (COL); W 11–00s1	Lee (KOR); L 00H–10	Bye		Malonga (FRA); W 01–00	3rd place, bronze medalist(s)
Yulia Lianichenko	+78 kg	—N/a	Han (KOR); L 00s2–01	did not advance			Jacinto Daniel (BRA); L 10s1–00s3	did not advance		
Maria Persidskaya*; Galiya Sagitova; Natalia Golomidova; Valentina Kostenko; Tatiana Kovalenko; Aleksandra Babintseva; Anzhela Gasparian*; Yulia Lianichenko*	Team	—N/a	Bye	Mexico (MEX); W 5–0	Chinese Taipei (TPE); W 3–2	Japan (JPN); L 1–4	—N/a	Bye	Italy (ITA); W 3–2	3rd place, bronze medalist(s)

=== Roller Sports ===
Men

Athlete	Event	Heat		Semifinal		Final	
Athlete	Event	Time	Rank	Time	Rank	Time	Rank
Sergey Fokin	200 m time trial	28.267	17	—N/a		did not advance	
Sergey Fokin	500 m sprint	44.932	5	did not advance			
Sergey Fokin	Marathon	—N/a				DNF	—
Maksim Gutsalov	300 m time trial	27.914	15	—N/a		did not advance	
Maksim Gutsalov	1000 m sprint	—N/a		1:36.230	20	did not advance	
Maksim Gutsalov	10000 m elimination	—N/a				EL	14
Maksim Gutsalov	15000 m elimination	—N/a				EL	5
Maksim Gutsalov	Marathon	—N/a				1:19:45.774	25
Egor Kotkov	Speed slalom	5.397	10	did not advance			
Daniil Obukhov	Marathon	—N/a				DNF	—
Gleb Pervov	Marathon	—N/a				DNF	—
Evgeny Pilipenko	10000 m elimination	—N/a				EL	14
Evgeny Pilipenko	15000 m elimination	—N/a				EL	5
Evgeny Pilipenko	Marathon	—N/a				DNF	—
Alexander Timchenko	Speed slalom	4.990	8	did not advance			
Kirill Vinokurov	500 m sprint	49.782	5	did not advance			
Kirill Vinokurov	1000 m sprint	—N/a		1:36.310	21	did not advance	
Maksim Gutsalov; Evgeny Pilipenko; Sergey Fokin; Kirill Vinokurov	3000 metre relay	DSQ	—	—N/a		did not advance	

Women

Athlete	Event	Heat		Semifinal		Final	
Athlete	Event	Time	Rank	Time	Rank	Time	Rank
Daria Gorbatenko	300 m time trial	32.015	16	—N/a		did not advance	
Daria Gorbatenko	500 m sprint	49.807	4	did not advance			
Daria Gorbatenko	Marathon	—N/a				1:33:45.770	30
Elizaveta Luzhbina	Marathon	—N/a				DNF	—
Kristina Lysenko	Speed slalom	5.253	3 Q	6.293; 6.233	2 CF	6.034; 5.975	3rd place, bronze medalist(s)
Ekaterina Nemilostiva	Marathon	—N/a				DNF	—
Oksana Pervenenok	Speed slalom	5.622	4 Q	5.505; 5.539	2 CF	6.095; 6.275	4
Anna Pristalova	1000 m sprint	—N/a		1:42.051	19	did not advance	
Anna Pristalova	10000 m elimination	—N/a				EL	8
Anna Pristalova	15000 m elimination	—N/a				EL	6
Anna Pristalova	Marathon	—N/a				1:31:44.785	28
Anna Seldimirova	1000 m sprint	—N/a		1:49.117	20	did not advance	
Anna Seldimirova	10000 m elimination	—N/a				EL	8
Anna Seldimirova	15000 m elimination	—N/a				EL	6
Anna Seldimirova	Marathon	—N/a				1:31:44.898	29
Elena Trandafilova	300 m time trial	32.833	17	—N/a		did not advance	
Elena Trandafilova	500 m sprint	52.859	5	did not advance			
Elena Trandafilova	Marathon	—N/a				DNF	—
Anna Seldimirova; Daria Gorbatenko; Anna Pristalova; Elena Trandafilova	3000 metre relay	DSQ	—	—N/a		did not advance	

=== Swimming ===
Men

Athlete	Event	Heat		Semifinal		Final	
Athlete	Event	Time	Rank	Time	Rank	Time	Rank
Vyacheslav Andrusenko	200 m freestyle	1:49.45	4 Q	1:48.62	9	did not advance	
Vyacheslav Andrusenko	400 m freestyle	3:56.20	18	—N/a		did not advance	
Andrey Arbuzov	50 m backstroke	25.85	18	did not advance			
Andrey Arbuzov	100 m freestyle	50.46	25	did not advance			
Kirill Belyaev	10 km marathon	—N/a				1:57:06.8	5
Aleksey Bryansky	50 m freestyle	22.19	3 Q	22.23	6 Q	22.18	5
Mikhail Dorinov	50 m breaststroke	28.61	27	did not advance			
Mikhail Dorinov	100 m breaststroke	1:01.80		did not advance			
Mikhail Dorinov	200 m breaststroke	2:10.93	2 Q	2:10.31	2 Q	2:09.92	4
Aleksandr Fedorov	800 m freestyle	8:02.62	12	—N/a		did not advance	
Sergey Fesikov	50 m freestyle	22.40	10 Q	22.37	10	did not advance	
Rustam Gadirov	50 m breaststroke	28.74	33	did not advance			
Rustam Gadirov	100 m breaststroke	1:00.61	Q	1:00.66	5 Q	1:00.68	5
Rustam Gadirov	200 m breaststroke	2:10.93	5 Q	2:09.87	1 Q	2:09.72	3rd place, bronze medalist(s)
Nikita Korolev	100 m freestyle	49.93	14 Q	49.28	8 Q	49.27	7
Roman Kozhevnikov	10 km marathon	—N/a				1:57:21.9	9
Aleksandr Kudashev	100 m butterfly	53.29	13 Q	53.14	11	did not advance	
Aleksandr Kudashev	200 m butterfly	1:57.91	2 Q	1:57.37	7 Q	1:56.48	5
Roman Larin	100 m backstroke	55.21	9 Q	54.95	9	did not advance	
Roman Larin	200 m backstroke	2:00.78	8 Q	1:59.84	7 Q	1:57.29	3rd place, bronze medalist(s)
Ernest Maksumov	400 m freestyle	3:53.43	12	did not advance			
Ernest Maksumov	800 m freestyle	8:04.56	14	—N/a		did not advance	
Ernest Maksumov	1500 m freestyle	15:29.46	14	did not advance			
Aleksandr Osipenko	200 m individual medley	2:01.35	2 Q	2:00.55	4 Q	2:01.11	5
Aleksandr Osipenko	400 m individual medley	4:17.63	1 Q	—N/a		4:16.63	3rd place, bronze medalist(s)
Aleksandr Pribytok	200 m butterfly	2:00.16	15 Q	1:56.73	4 Q	1:57.15	7
Aleksandr Sadovnikov	50 m butterfly	23.79	4 Q	23.71	6 Q	23.87	8
Aleksandr Sadovnikov	100 m butterfly	52.43	1 Q	52.63	8 Q	51.81	1st place, gold medalist(s)
Andrey Shabasov	100 m backstroke	55.46	12 Q	54.96	10	did not advance	
Andrey Shabasov	200 m backstroke	2:02.19	16 Q	1:59.40	6 Q	1:58.16	5
Nikita Ulyanov	50 m backstroke	25.44	9 Q	25.11	2 Q	25.20	6
Mikhail Vekovishchev	200 m freestyle	1:49.90	9 Q	1:47.32	1 Q	1:46.48	3rd place, bronze medalist(s)
Andrey Zhilkin	50 m butterfly	23.86	2 Q	23.45	2 Q	23.40	2nd place, silver medalist(s)
Andrey Zhilkin	200 m individual medley	2:01.85	10 Q	2:00.17	2 Q	2:00.26	4
Andrey Zhilkin	400 m individual medley	did not start					
Andrey Arbuzov; Aleksey Brianskiy*; Sergey Fesikov; Nikita Korolev; Mikhail Vekovishchev	4 × 100 m freestyle relay	3:17.30	3 Q	—N/a		3:15.78	3rd place, bronze medalist(s)
Viacheslav Andrusenko; Ernest Maksumov; Aleksandr Kudashev*; Aleksandr Fedorov*; Elisey Stepanov; Mikhail Vekovishchev	4 × 200 m freestyle relay	7:19.29	4 Q	—N/a		7:13.47	3rd place, bronze medalist(s)
Mikhail Dorinov*; Rustam Gadirov; Nikita Korolev*; Aleksandr Kudashev*; Aleksandr Sadovnikov; Andrey Shabasov*; Mikhail Vekovishchev	4 × 100 m medley relay	3:38.69	7 Q	—N/a		3:34.85	2nd place, silver medalist(s)

Women

Athlete	Event	Heat		Semifinal		Final	
Athlete	Event	Time	Rank	Time	Rank	Time	Rank
Sofiya Andreeva	100 m breaststroke	1:11.39	19	did not advance			
Sofiya Andreeva	200 m breaststroke	2:30.41	8 Q	2:28.33	8 Q	2:30.01	8
Maria Baklakova	50 m freestyle	26.26	19	did not advance			
Anna Egorova	400 m freestyle	4:15.49	14	did not advance			
Anna Egorova	800 m freestyle	8:51.79	15	did not advance			
Anastasia Guzhenkova	200 m butterfly	2:14.55	11 Q	did not advance			
Anastasia Guzhenkova	200 m freestyle	2:01.29	14 Q	1:58.87	2 Q	1:59.44	7
Maria Kameneva	50 m backstroke	28.31	2 Q	28.30	3 Q	28.25	4
Maria Kameneva	50 m butterfly	27.21	13 Q	26.96	12	did not advance	
Maria Kameneva	50 m freestyle	24.99	1 Q	24.82	1 Q	25.08	2nd place, silver medalist(s)
Maria Kameneva	100 m backstroke	1:00.60	2 Q	1:01.32	10	did not advance	
Maria Kameneva	100 m freestyle	55.04	1 Q	55.07	4 Q	54.37	2nd place, silver medalist(s)
Olga Kozydub	10 km marathon	—N/a				2:06:49.0	11
Polina Lapshina	100 m backstroke	1:01.91	13 Q	1:01.04	7 Q	1:01.37	7
Maria Novikova	10 km marathon	—N/a				2:05:05.0	8
Arina Openysheva	100 m freestyle	55.70	9 Q	55.42	8 Q	54.89	3rd place, bronze medalist(s)
Arina Openysheva	200 m freestyle	2:00.98	10 Q	1:59.53	8 Q	1:58.53	3rd place, bronze medalist(s)
Arina Openysheva	400 m freestyle	4:15.36	13	did not advance			
Irina Prikhodko	50 m backstroke	28.95	11 Q	28.68	7 Q	28.86	8
Irina Prikhodko	200 m backstroke	2:13.27	10 Q	2:12.87	9	did not advance	
Valeria Salamatina	800 m freestyle	9:00.25	19	did not advance			
Maria Temnikova	50 m breaststroke	32.49	14 Q	32.93	16	did not advance	
Maria Temnikova	100 m breaststroke	1:08.78	5 Q	1:08.64	7 Q	1:08.29	7
Maria Temnikova	200 m breaststroke	2:29.34	5 Q	2:26.95	4 Q	2:24.73	3rd place, bronze medalist(s)
Kristina Vershinina	200 m individual medley	2:15.16	6 Q	2:14.90	9	did not advance	
Kristina Vershinina	400 m individual medley	4:48.68	12	did not advance			
Maria Baklakova*; Anastasia Guzhenkova; Maria Kameneva; Polina Lapshina; Arina Openysheva	4 × 100 m freestyle relay	3:41.89	2 Q	—N/a		3:39.39	2nd place, silver medalist(s)
Maria Baklakova; Anna Egorova*; Anastasia Guzhenkova; Arina Openysheva; Valeria Salamatina	4 × 200 m freestyle relay	8:03.62	2 Q	—N/a		7:55.28	1st place, gold medalist(s)
Anastasia Guzhenkova; Polina Lapshina; Maria Temnikova; Arina Openysheva	4 × 100 m medley relay	4:08.86	7 Q	—N/a		4:04.07	6

=== Table tennis ===
Individuals

Athlete	Event	Group stage			1/32 final	1/16 final	1/8 final	Quarterfinals	Semifinals	Final / BM	
Athlete	Event	Opposition Result	Opposition Result	Rank	Opposition Result	Opposition Result	Opposition Result	Opposition Result	Opposition Result	Opposition Result	Rank
Maxim Chaplygin	Men's singles	Bayarsaikhan (MNG); W 3–0	Kjellson (SWE); W 3–0	1 Q	Cassin (FRA); L 1–4	did not advance					
Vildan Gadiev	Men's singles	Cillis (ARG); W 3–0	Moya (CHI); W 3–1	1 Q	Liao (TPE); L 0–4	did not advance					
Arseniy Gusev	Men's singles	Kim (KOR); W 3–0	Sun (TPE); W 3–0	1 Q	Qiu (GER); W 4–1	Yokota (BRA); L 2–4	did not advance				
Sadi Ismailov	Men's singles	Bye			Ma (NZL); W 4–0	Lee (TPE); L 3–4	did not advance				
Taras Merslikin	Men's singles	Gmiraks (LAT); W 3–0	Lu (CAN); W 3–0	1 Q	Storf (AUT); W 4–1	Chen (TPE); L 1–4	did not advance				
Anna Blazhko	Women's singles	Bayarsaikhan (MNG); W 3–0	Toompere (EST); W 3–0	1 Q	Jonsson (SWE); L 2–4	did not advance					
Ekaterian Guseva	Women's singles	Yan (CAN); W 3–0	Imamura (GER); W 3–1	1 Q	Chong (TPE); W 4–0	Narumoto (JPN); L 0–4	did not advance				
Elizaveta Khlyzova	Women's singles	Tan (PHI); W 3–0	Lam (SGP); W 3–2	1 Q	Duran (CHI); W 4–0	Wu (USA); L 1–4	did not advance				
Yana Noskova	Women's singles	Bye			Tsaptsinos (GBR); W 4–0	Suzuki (JPN); L 3–4	did not advance				
Valeria Shcherbatykh	Women's singles	Ganzorig (MNG); W 3–0	Chezom (BHU); W 3–0	1 Q	Jiang (NZL); W 4–0	Lee (KOR); L 2–4	did not advance				

Doubles

Athlete	Event	1/64 final	1/32 final	1/16 final	1/8 final	Quarterfinals	Semifinals	Final / BM	
Athlete	Event	Opposition Result	Opposition Result	Opposition Result	Opposition Result	Opposition Result	Opposition Result	Opposition Result	Rank
Vildan Gadiev; Arseniy Gusev	Men's doubles	Bye	Pava / Vergara (COL); W 3–0	Choe / Pak (PRK); L 0–3	did not advance				
Sadi Ismailov; Taras Merslikin	Men's doubles	Bye	Duffy / Tsao (AUS); W 3–0	Harrison / Reed (GBR); W 3–0	Ham / Kang (PRK); W 3–2	Morizono / Oshima (JPN); L 0–4	did not advance		
Anna Blazhko; Elizaveta Khlyzova	Women's doubles	—N/a	Dong / Yue (NZL); W 3–0	Gonapinuwala / Warusawithana (SRI); W 3–0	Jeon / Lee (KOR); L 0–3	did not advance			
Ekaterian Guseva; Yana Noskova	Women's doubles	—N/a	Alimbayeva / Almagambetova (KAZ); W 3–0	Imamura / Kaiser (GER); L 1–3	did not advance				
Sadi Ismailov; Ekaterina Guseva	Mixed's doubles	Rööse / Zetterström (SWE); W 3–2	Konstantinopoulos / Paridi (GRE); W 3–0	Spelbuş / Szőcs (ROU); L 1–3	did not advance				
Taras Merslikin; Yana Noskova	Mixed's doubles	Townsend / Tan (AUS); W 3–0	Mühlbach / Michajlova (GER); W 3–1	Choe / Choe (PRK); L 0–3	did not advance				

Teams

Athlete	Event	Group stage				1/8 final	Quarterfinals	Semifinals	Final / BM	
Athlete	Event	Opposition Result	Opposition Result	Opposition Result	Rank	Opposition Result	Opposition Result	Opposition Result	Opposition Result	Rank
Maxim Chaplygin; Vildan Gadiev; Arseniy Gusev; Sadi Ismailov; Taras Merslikin	Men's team	New Zealand (NZL); W 3–0	China (CHN); L 2–3	Argentina (ARG); W 3–0	2 Q	Austria (AUT); W 3–1	Japan (JPN); L 1–3	did not advance		
Anna Blazhko; Ekaterian Guseva; Elizaveta Khlyzova; Yana Noskova; Valeria Shcherbatykh	Women's team	Estonia (EST); W 3–0	Germany (GER); W 3–1	Chile (CHI); W 3–1	1 Q	Czech Republic (CZE); W 3–1	China (CHN); L 0–3	did not advance		

=== Taekwondo ===
Athlete	Event	Round of 32 / Preliminary Round	Round of 16	Quarterfinals	Semifinals	Final	
Athlete	Event	Opposition Result	Opposition Result	Opposition Result	Opposition Result	Opposition Result	Rank
Bulat Magomedov	Men's −54 kg	Alkindi (UAE); W 0–DSQ	Al-Shdouh (JOR); W 23–12	Hadipour (IRN); L 3–20	did not advance		5
Gulzhigit Kochkorbaev	Men's −58 kg	Weintraub (USA); W 13–6	Dimitrov (MDA); W 9–8	Laachraoui (BEL); W 4–2	Bragança (POR); L 3–4	Did not advance	3rd place, bronze medalist(s)
Maksat Allalyev	Men's −63 kg	Carroll (CAN); W 14–6	Mecmajer (POL); L 12–15	did not advance			17
Boris Krasnov	Men's −68 kg	Ancheta (PHI); W 29–2	Ehsanipetroudi (IRN); W 5–2	Huang (TPE); W 7–5	Abughaush (JOR); W 17–15	Taghizade (AZE); W 2–0	1st place, gold medalist(s)
Sergey Neverdinov	Men's −74 kg	Rosillo (ESP); L 10–19	did not advance				17
Rafail Ayukaev	Men's +87 kg	Bye	Amirbekyan (CAN); W 22–1	Kattan (JOR); W 19–7	Isaev (AZE); W 36–8	Andrade (BRA); W WDR	1st place, gold medalist(s)
Bogdan Grechkin	Men's −68 kg	Al-Anazi (KSA); W 11–2	Beigi (AZE); L 8–25	did not advance			9
Rafael Kamalov	Men's −87 kg	Chavarria (COL); W 22–4	Duisebay (KAZ); W 3–2	Muhammad (GBR); W 5–4	Rajabi (IRN); L 9–10	Did not advance	3rd place, bronze medalist(s)
Dmitry Kim	Men's individual poomsae	7.630	—N/a		did not advance		15
Rafail Ayukaev; Maksat Allalyev; Bogdan Grechkin; Bulat Magomedov	Men's team Kyorugi	Bye	Mexico (MEX); W 39–21	Chile (CHI); W 82–25	Kazakhstan (KAZ); W 18–10	Chinese Taipei (TPE); W 34–20	1st place, gold medalist(s)
Sofya Fomicheva	Women's −46 kg	Sah (IND); W 15–1	Romoldanova (UKR); L 5–8	did not advance			9
Anastasia Anokhina	Women's −49 kg	Yamada (JPN); L 13–14	did not advance				17
Daria Chesnokova	Women's −53 kg	Chambers (USA); L 5–13	did not advance				17
Anisia Chelokhsaeva	Women's −57 kg	Kamuanya (COD); W 21–3	Cunha (POR); W 5–5	Adamkiewicz (POL); W 5–4	İlgün (TUR); L 4–5	Did not advance	3rd place, bronze medalist(s)
Yulia Turutina	Women's −62 kg	Rousseau (CAN); W 16–5	Alzak (KAZ); W 22–4	Yaman (TUR); L 0–13	did not advance		5
Yulia Miyuts	Women's −67 kg	Mirhosseini (IRN); L 8–11	did not advance				17
Alina Ikaeva	Women's –73 kg	Bye	Cuma (CAN); W 30–13	L	did not advance		5
Olesya Bardachenko	Women's +73 kg	Sukeewas (THA); W 8–4	Kowalczuk (POL); L 6–16	did not advance			9
Viktoria Kim	Women's individual poomsae	7.517	—N/a		did not advance		21
Elizaveta Gladilova; Viktoria Kim; Anastasia Miroshnichenko	Women's team Poomsea	Bye	—N/a		7.517	6.727	8
Anisia Chelokhsaeva; Alina Ikaeva; Yulia Miyuts; Yulia Turutina	Women's team Kyorugi	Canada (CAN); W 24–11	Mexico (MEX); L 11–13	did not advance			
Dmitry Kim; Viktoria Kim	Mixed pair Poomsea	Bye	—N/a		7.500	Did not advance	15

=== Tennis ===
Men

Athlete	Event	1st Round	2nd Round	3rd Round	4th Round	Quarterfinals	Semifinals	Final	
Athlete	Event	Opposition Score	Opposition Score	Opposition Score	Opposition Score	Opposition Score	Opposition Score	Opposition Score	Rank
Aslan Karatsev	Singles	Bye	Maritz (RSA); W 6–2, 6–3	Tang (HKG); L 5–7, 1–6	did not advance				
Roman Safiullin	Singles	Bye	Singh (IND); W 6–2, 6–2	Rocha (BRA); W 6–2, 6–0	Poullain (FRA); W 6–2, 6–4	K-y Lee (TPE); W 6–3, 0–6, 5–5 ret.	S-c Hong (KOR); L 3–6, 4–6	Did not advance	3rd place, bronze medalist(s)
Aslan Karatsev; Richard Muzaev	Doubles	Maritz / Nel (RSA); W 6–4, 6–2	Bonfre / Stjern (SWE); W 6–2, 6–4	—N/a		Khabibulin / Yevseyev (KAZ); W 6–2, 6–4	C-h Wong / P-l Yeung (HKG); W 6–4, 7–5	Findel-Hawkins / Johnson (GBR); W 6–1, 3–6, [10–7]	1st place, gold medalist(s)

Team classification

Team	Rank
Men's	3rd place, bronze medalist(s)

Women

Athlete	Event	1st Round	2nd Round	3rd Round	4th Round	Quarterfinals	Semifinals	Final	
Athlete	Event	Opposition Score	Opposition Score	Opposition Score	Opposition Score	Opposition Score	Opposition Score	Opposition Score	Rank
Anastasia Frolova	Singles	Bye	Hart (USA); L 6–2, 2–6, 5–7	did not advance					
Victoria Kan	Singles	Bye	Hamlin (SWE); W 6–2, 6–0	Arbuthnott (GBR); L 3–6, 0–3 ret.	did not advance				
Olga Doroshina; Anastasia Pivovarova	Doubles	Henao / Palacio (COL); W 6–0, 6–0	Baral / Sharma (NEP); W 6–0, 6–0	—N/a		Vara Wongteanchai / Varu Wongteanchai (THA); L 1–6, 0–6	did not advance		

Mixed

Athlete	Event	1st Round	2nd Round	3rd Round	4th Round	Quarterfinals	Semifinals	Final	
Athlete	Event	Opposition Score	Opposition Score	Opposition Score	Opposition Score	Opposition Score	Opposition Score	Opposition Score	Rank
Anastasia Pivovarova; Richard Muzaev	Mixed doubles	Bye	Horton / Wagland (AUS); W 6–2, 6–4	Mesquita / Borges (POR); W 6–4, 6–1	—N/a	Parajová / Kosec (SVK); L 3–6, 7–5, [7–10]	did not advance		

=== Volleyball ===
==== Men's tournament ====
Group play

Pos	Team	Pld	W	L	Pts	SW	SL	SR	SPW	SPL	SPR	Qualification
1	Russia	5	5	0	15	15	1	15.000	411	335	1.227	Quarterfinals
2	Czech Republic	5	4	1	11	12	6	2.000	415	366	1.134	Quarterfinals
3	Romania	5	3	2	9	11	7	1.571	427	403	1.060	9th–16th place
4	Hong Kong	5	2	3	5	8	13	0.615	411	464	0.886	9th–16th place
5	Australia	5	1	4	4	6	13	0.462	420	429	0.979	17th–22nd place
6	Chile	5	0	5	1	3	15	0.200	335	422	0.794	17th–22nd place

20 August 2017; 18:00	Russia	3–0	Hong Kong	Tsing Hua University Gymnasium, Taipei; Attendance: 1,000; Referees: Hansen Shen Leong (USA), Azad Khayyam Hosein (CAN)
20 August 2017; 18:00	(25–20, 25–17, 25–14); Result Statistics			Tsing Hua University Gymnasium, Taipei; Attendance: 1,000; Referees: Hansen Shen Leong (USA), Azad Khayyam Hosein (CAN)

21 August 2017; 15:00	Australia	0–3	Russia	Tsing Hua University Gymnasium, Taipei; Attendance: 750; Referees: Tadayoshi Asai (JPN), Maria Del Carmen Duran (MEX)
21 August 2017; 15:00	(31–33, 21–25, 20–25); Result Statistics			Tsing Hua University Gymnasium, Taipei; Attendance: 750; Referees: Tadayoshi Asai (JPN), Maria Del Carmen Duran (MEX)

22 August 2017; 13:00	Russia	3–1	Romania	Tsing Hua University Gymnasium, Taipei; Attendance: 1,200; Referees: Loïc Queste (FRA), Jediel Hosana de Carvalho (BRA)
22 August 2017; 13:00	(26–24, 25–15, 23–25, 25–19); Result Statistics			Tsing Hua University Gymnasium, Taipei; Attendance: 1,200; Referees: Loïc Queste (FRA), Jediel Hosana de Carvalho (BRA)

24 August 2017; 15:00	Czech Republic	0–3	Russia	Taiwan University Sports Center, Taipei; Attendance: 2,015; Referees: Gustavo Costa (BRA), Shingo Yamamoto (JPN)
24 August 2017; 15:00	(22–25, 23–25, 17–25); Result Statistics			Taiwan University Sports Center, Taipei; Attendance: 2,015; Referees: Gustavo Costa (BRA), Shingo Yamamoto (JPN)

25 August 2017; 15:00	Russia	3–0	Chile	Tsing Hua University Gymnasium, Taipei; Attendance: 950; Referees: Cédric Grellier (SUI), Shu Fang Chung (TPE)
25 August 2017; 15:00	(25–21, 29–27, 25–19); Result Statistics			Tsing Hua University Gymnasium, Taipei; Attendance: 950; Referees: Cédric Grellier (SUI), Shu Fang Chung (TPE)

Quarterfinals

27 August 2017; 18:00	Argentina	2–3	Russia	Taiwan University Sports Center, Taipei; Attendance: 3,000; Referees: Keng Hao Hsu (TPE), Hansen Shen Leong (USA)
27 August 2017; 18:00	(25–22, 25–17, 23–25, 18–25, 11–15); Result Statistics			Taiwan University Sports Center, Taipei; Attendance: 3,000; Referees: Keng Hao Hsu (TPE), Hansen Shen Leong (USA)

Semifinals

28 August 2017; 15:00	Japan	0–3	Russia	Taiwan University Sports Center, Taipei; Attendance: 2,500; Referees: Sasa Stanisic (SUI), Keng Hao Hsu (TPE)
28 August 2017; 15:00	(18–25, 23–25, 22–25); Result Statistics			Taiwan University Sports Center, Taipei; Attendance: 2,500; Referees: Sasa Stanisic (SUI), Keng Hao Hsu (TPE)

Final

29 August 2017; 20:00	(silver) Russia	2–3	Iran	Taiwan University Sports Center, Taipei; Attendance: 4,000; Referees: Jose Luis Barrios (ARG), Sasa Stanisic (SUI)
29 August 2017; 20:00	(17–25, 25–15, 25–23, 23–25, 13–15); Result Statistics			Taiwan University Sports Center, Taipei; Attendance: 4,000; Referees: Jose Luis Barrios (ARG), Sasa Stanisic (SUI)

==== Women's tournament ====
Group play

Pos	Team	Pld	W	L	Pts	SW	SL	SR	SPW	SPL	SPR	Qualification
1	Russia	3	3	0	9	9	1	9.000	246	180	1.367	Quarterfinals
2	Finland	3	2	1	6	6	3	2.000	204	182	1.121	Quarterfinals
3	Brazil	3	1	2	3	4	6	0.667	213	219	0.973	
4	Mexico	3	0	3	0	0	9	0.000	143	225	0.636	

21 August 2017; 18:00	Mexico	0–3	Russia	Taiwan Normal U.M.C. Gymnasium, Taipei; Attendance: 400; Referees: Khaled Alhantoobi (UAE), Ricardo Ferreira (POR)
21 August 2017; 18:00	(20–25, 9–25, 15–25); Result Statistics			Taiwan Normal U.M.C. Gymnasium, Taipei; Attendance: 400; Referees: Khaled Alhantoobi (UAE), Ricardo Ferreira (POR)

22 August 2017; 20:00	Finland	0–3	Russia	Taiwan Normal U.M.C. Gymnasium, Taipei; Attendance: 600; Referees: Azad Khayyam Hosein (CAN), Andreas Daniil (CYP)
22 August 2017; 20:00	(19–25, 14–25, 21–25); Result Statistics			Taiwan Normal U.M.C. Gymnasium, Taipei; Attendance: 600; Referees: Azad Khayyam Hosein (CAN), Andreas Daniil (CYP)

23 August 2017; 20:10	Russia	3–1	Brazil	Taiwan University Sports Center, Taipei; Attendance: 2,200; Referees: Tadayoshi Asai (JPN), Ricardo Ferreira (POR)
23 August 2017; 20:10	(21–25, 25–15, 25–21, 25–21); Result Statistics			Taiwan University Sports Center, Taipei; Attendance: 2,200; Referees: Tadayoshi Asai (JPN), Ricardo Ferreira (POR)

Quarterfinals

25 August 2017; 13:00	Russia	3–0	Thailand	Taiwan University Sports Center, Taipei; Attendance: 1,600; Referees: Salvis Kurtiss (LAT), Jediel Hosana de Carvalho
25 August 2017; 13:00	(25–17, 25–20, 25–12); Result Statistics			Taiwan University Sports Center, Taipei; Attendance: 1,600; Referees: Salvis Kurtiss (LAT), Jediel Hosana de Carvalho

Semifinals

26 August 2017; 18:00	Russia	3–0	Ukraine	Taiwan University Sports Center, Taipei; Attendance: 4,000; Referees: Devonie McLarty (USA), Rene Cinatl (CZE)
26 August 2017; 18:00	(25–20, 25–18, 25–21); Result Statistics			Taiwan University Sports Center, Taipei; Attendance: 4,000; Referees: Devonie McLarty (USA), Rene Cinatl (CZE)

Final

28 August 2017; 20:00	(gold) Russia	3–1	Japan	Taiwan University Sports Center, Taipei; Referees: Devonie McLarty (USA); Shu Fang Chung (TPE)
28 August 2017; 20:00	(25–18, 17–25, 25–22, 25–22)			Taiwan University Sports Center, Taipei; Referees: Devonie McLarty (USA); Shu Fang Chung (TPE)

=== Water polo ===
==== Men's tournament ====
Preliminary round

Team	Pld	W	D	L	GF	GA	GD	Pts
Russia	3	2	1	0	33	22	+11	5
Japan	3	2	0	1	32	23	+9	4
United States	3	1	1	1	31	26	+5	3
Romania	3	0	0	3	18	43	−25	0

18 August 2017; 18:20	Report	Russia	14–5	Romania	Hsinchu County Natatorium; Referees: Adam Richardson (AUS); Damien Taylor (GBR)
18 August 2017; 18:20	Report	Score by quarters: 4–0, 5–1, 3–2, 2–2			Hsinchu County Natatorium; Referees: Adam Richardson (AUS); Damien Taylor (GBR)
18 August 2017; 18:20	Report	Shepelev 3	Goals	Vancsik 2	Hsinchu County Natatorium; Referees: Adam Richardson (AUS); Damien Taylor (GBR)

20 August 2017; 18:20	Report	United States	11–11	Russia	Hsinchu County Natatorium; Referees: Balazs Szekely (HUN); Marco Ercoli (ITA)
20 August 2017; 18:20	Report	Score by quarters: 3–3, 4–3, 1–3, 3–2			Hsinchu County Natatorium; Referees: Balazs Szekely (HUN); Marco Ercoli (ITA)
20 August 2017; 18:20	Report	Stevenson 3	Goals	Lazarev 3	Hsinchu County Natatorium; Referees: Balazs Szekely (HUN); Marco Ercoli (ITA)

21 August 2017; 18:20	Report	Russia	8–6	Japan	Hsinchu County Natatorium; Referees: Andreas Moiralis (GRE); Attila Marosvari (HUN)
21 August 2017; 18:20	Report	Score by quarters: 1–3, 0–1, 4–0, 3–2			Hsinchu County Natatorium; Referees: Andreas Moiralis (GRE); Attila Marosvari (HUN)
21 August 2017; 18:20	Report	Merkulov 3	Goals	Yoshida 2	Hsinchu County Natatorium; Referees: Andreas Moiralis (GRE); Attila Marosvari (HUN)

Eightfinals

23 August 2017; 18:20	Report	Argentina	2–17	Russia	Hsinchu County Natatorium; Referees: Keiichi Orikasa (JPN); Maxim Gerasimov (GBR)
23 August 2017; 18:20	Report	Score by quarters: 1–3, 1–2, 0–7, 0–5			Hsinchu County Natatorium; Referees: Keiichi Orikasa (JPN); Maxim Gerasimov (GBR)
23 August 2017; 18:20	Report	Galimberti 2	Goals	Lazarev, Merkulov 3	Hsinchu County Natatorium; Referees: Keiichi Orikasa (JPN); Maxim Gerasimov (GBR)

Quarterfinals

25 August 2017; 19:30	Report	Japan	7–12	Russia	Hsinchu County Natatorium; Referees: Jaume Teixido (ESP); Igor Virijevic (SRB)
25 August 2017; 19:30	Report	Score by quarters: 3–3, 0–4, 2–4, 2–1			Hsinchu County Natatorium; Referees: Jaume Teixido (ESP); Igor Virijevic (SRB)
25 August 2017; 19:30	Report	Adachi 3	Goals	four players 2	Hsinchu County Natatorium; Referees: Jaume Teixido (ESP); Igor Virijevic (SRB)

Semifinals

28 August 2017; 19:30	Report	Italy	9–11	Russia	National Taiwan Sport University Arena; Referees: Andreas Moiralis (GRE); Igor Virijevic (SRB)
28 August 2017; 19:30	Report	Score by quarters: 1–4, 1–3, 3–2, 4–2			National Taiwan Sport University Arena; Referees: Andreas Moiralis (GRE); Igor Virijevic (SRB)
28 August 2017; 19:30	Report	Dolce 3	Goals	Kharkov 3	National Taiwan Sport University Arena; Referees: Andreas Moiralis (GRE); Igor Virijevic (SRB)

Final

30 August 2017; 13:30	Report	Serbia	15–4	Russia (silver)	National Taiwan Sport University Arena; Referees: Attila Marosvari (HUN); Jaume Teixido (ESP)
30 August 2017; 13:30	Report	Score by quarters: 3–0, 5–2, 4–2, 3–0			National Taiwan Sport University Arena; Referees: Attila Marosvari (HUN); Jaume Teixido (ESP)
30 August 2017; 13:30	Report	five players	Goals	Kholod 2	National Taiwan Sport University Arena; Referees: Attila Marosvari (HUN); Jaume Teixido (ESP)

==== Women's tournament ====
Preliminary round

Team	Pld	W	D	L	GF	GA	GD	Pts
Russia	5	5	0	0	95	44	+51	10
Hungary	5	3	0	2	76	35	+41	6
Japan	5	3	0	2	64	60	+4	6
Canada	5	3	0	2	69	43	+26	6
Great Britain	5	0	1	4	26	104	−78	1
New Zealand	5	0	1	4	32	76	−44	1

18 August 2017; 11:40	Report	Russia	25–5	Great Britain	Taipei Songshan Sports Center Swimming Pool; Referees: Ursula Wengenroth (SUI); Amber Drury (USA)
18 August 2017; 11:40	Report	Score by quarters: 6–0, 6–0, 5–2, 8–3			Taipei Songshan Sports Center Swimming Pool; Referees: Ursula Wengenroth (SUI); Amber Drury (USA)
18 August 2017; 11:40	Report	Zubkova, Gorbunova 5	Goals	Huck 2	Taipei Songshan Sports Center Swimming Pool; Referees: Ursula Wengenroth (SUI); Amber Drury (USA)

20 August 2017; 13:00	Report	Canada	11–17	Russia	Taipei Songshan Sports Center Swimming Pool; Referees: Andrew Carney (AUS); Leonadro Cceccarelli (ITA)
20 August 2017; 13:00	Report	Score by quarters: 2–4, 3–4, 1–4, 5–5			Taipei Songshan Sports Center Swimming Pool; Referees: Andrew Carney (AUS); Leonadro Cceccarelli (ITA)
20 August 2017; 13:00	Report	Lemay Lavoie, Fournier 3	Goals	three players 3	Taipei Songshan Sports Center Swimming Pool; Referees: Andrew Carney (AUS); Leonadro Cceccarelli (ITA)

22 August 2017; 11:40	Report	Russia	23–3	New Zealand	Taipei Songshan Sports Center Swimming Pool; Referees: Andrew Carney (AUS); Chang Wan Yu (TPE)
22 August 2017; 11:40	Report	Score by quarters: 4–0, 7–2, 7–0, 5–1			Taipei Songshan Sports Center Swimming Pool; Referees: Andrew Carney (AUS); Chang Wan Yu (TPE)
22 August 2017; 11:40	Report	Simanovich 5	Goals	Nicholson 2	Taipei Songshan Sports Center Swimming Pool; Referees: Andrew Carney (AUS); Chang Wan Yu (TPE)

24 August 2017; 13:00	Report	Russia	12–11	Hungary	Taipei Songshan Sports Center Swimming Pool; Referees: Marco Ercoli (ITA); Jaume Teixido (ESP)
24 August 2017; 13:00	Report	Score by quarters: 4–5, 4–1, 1–3, 3–2			Taipei Songshan Sports Center Swimming Pool; Referees: Marco Ercoli (ITA); Jaume Teixido (ESP)
24 August 2017; 13:00	Report	Simanovich 3	Goals	Szilágyi 4	Taipei Songshan Sports Center Swimming Pool; Referees: Marco Ercoli (ITA); Jaume Teixido (ESP)

25 August 2017; 12:00	Report	Japan	14–18	Russia	Taipei Songshan Sports Center Swimming Pool; Referees: Pascal Bouchez (FRA); Amber Drury (USA)
25 August 2017; 12:00	Report	Score by quarters: 4–5, 3–5, 2–5, 5–3			Taipei Songshan Sports Center Swimming Pool; Referees: Pascal Bouchez (FRA); Amber Drury (USA)
25 August 2017; 12:00	Report	Arima 6	Goals	Trotskaya 5	Taipei Songshan Sports Center Swimming Pool; Referees: Pascal Bouchez (FRA); Amber Drury (USA)

Quarterfinals

26 August 2017; 13:30	Report	Russia	13–6	Australia	Taipei Songshan Sports Center Swimming Pool; Referees: Attila Marosvari (HUN); Keiichi Orikasa (JPN)
26 August 2017; 13:30	Report	Score by quarters: 4–1, 3–2, 4–2, 2–1			Taipei Songshan Sports Center Swimming Pool; Referees: Attila Marosvari (HUN); Keiichi Orikasa (JPN)
26 August 2017; 13:30	Report	three players	Goals	Carter 3	Taipei Songshan Sports Center Swimming Pool; Referees: Attila Marosvari (HUN); Keiichi Orikasa (JPN)

Semifinals

27 August 2017; 18:00	Report	Russia	7–11	Hungary	National Taiwan Sport University Arena; Referees: Marie Deslieres (CAN); Jaume Teixido (ESP)
27 August 2017; 18:00	Report	Score by quarters: 0–4, 3–3, 3–3, 1–1			National Taiwan Sport University Arena; Referees: Marie Deslieres (CAN); Jaume Teixido (ESP)
27 August 2017; 18:00	Report	Karimova, Gorbunova 2	Goals	Gurisatti, Szilagyi 3	National Taiwan Sport University Arena; Referees: Marie Deslieres (CAN); Jaume Teixido (ESP)

Bronze medal game

29 August 2017; 18:00	Report	Russia	11–12	Japan	National Taiwan Sport University Arena; Referees: Ursula Wengenroth; Erwin Schapers
29 August 2017; 18:00	Report	Score by quarters: 2–2, 2–4, 5–2, 2–4			National Taiwan Sport University Arena; Referees: Ursula Wengenroth; Erwin Schapers
29 August 2017; 18:00	Report	Gorbunova 4	Goals	Arima, Suzuki 3	National Taiwan Sport University Arena; Referees: Ursula Wengenroth; Erwin Schapers

=== Weightlifting ===
Men

Athlete	Event	Snatch		Clean & Jerk		Total	Rank
Athlete	Event	Result	Rank	Result	Rank	Total	Rank
Aleksandr Krasnov	−56 kg	100	1 B	123	2 B	223	13
Viacheslav Yarkin	−77 kg	150	1	180	2	330	2nd place, silver medalist(s)
Georgiy Sidakov	−85 kg	155	6	180	6	335	6
Egor Klimonov	−94 kg	168	4	215	1	283 UR	1st place, gold medalist(s)
Artem Okulov	−94 kg	160	9	186	11	346	11
Rodion Bochkov	−105 kg	180	1	210	3	390	2nd place, silver medalist(s)

Women

Athlete	Event	Snatch		Clean & Jerk		Total	Rank
Athlete	Event	Result	Rank	Result	Rank	Total	Rank
Nadezhda Lomova	−63 kg	90	8	—	—	—	—
Tima Turieva	−63 kg	102	3	124	3	226	2nd place, silver medalist(s)
Yana Kondrashova	−69 kg	90	2 B	113	3 B	203	2 B
Ani Sargsian	−69 kg	88	8	119	4	207	6
Anastasia Beslyudnaya	−90 kg	94	6	115	6	209	6
Diana Mstieva	−90 kg	110	2	132	2	242	2nd place, silver medalist(s)

=== Wushu ===
Men
Sanda

Athlete	Event	Preliminary	Quarterfinals	Semifinals	Final / BM	
Athlete	Event	Opposition Result	Opposition Result	Opposition Result	Opposition Result	Rank
Ali Magomedov	60 kg	Bye	Moran (USA); W 2–0	Ahangarian (IRN); L 0–2	Did not advance	3rd place, bronze medalist(s)
Magomed Abdulkhalikov	70 kg	Chung (TPE); W 2–0	Shirzadeh Topraghlo (IRN); L 0–2	did not advance		
Bagatyr Kazanatov	80 kg	Bye	Ladvar (IRN); L 1–2	did not advance		

Taolu

Athlete	Event	Pool 1	Pool 2	
Athlete	Event	Opposition Result	Opposition Result	Rank
Pavel Muratov	Changquan	—N/a	9.45	2nd place, silver medalist(s)
Ilias Khusnutdinov	Daoshu / Gunshu	9.44	9.61	2nd place, silver medalist(s)

Women
Sanda

Athlete	Event	Preliminary	Quarterfinals	Semifinals	Final / BM	
Athlete	Event	Opposition Result	Opposition Result	Opposition Result	Opposition Result	Rank
Alina Vinkova	60 kg	—N/a	Olkhovyk (UKR); L 0–2	did not advance		

Taolu

Athlete	Event	Pool 1	Pool 2	
Athlete	Event	Opposition Result	Opposition Result	Rank
Sandra Konstantinova	Changquan	—N/a	9.35	2nd place, silver medalist(s)
Daria Gerasimova	Nanquan / Nandao	9.34	9.27	4

== See also ==
- Russia at the Universiade
