= Gymnastics at the 2017 Summer Universiade – Women's rhythmic individual ribbon =

Women's rhythmic individual ribbon at the 2017 Summer Universiade
- Venue: Taipei Nangang Exhibition Center
- Date: 29 August
- Competitors: 8 from 6 nations

Medalists
gold medal	Yulia Bravikova	Russia
silver medal	Ekaterina Selezneva	Russia
bronze medal	Takana Tatsuzawa	Japan

The Women's ribbon gymnastics at the 2017 Summer Universiade in Taipei was held on 29 August at the Taipei Nangang Exhibition Center.

== Schedule ==
All times are Taiwan Standard Time (UTC+08:00).

Date	Time	Event
Tuesday, 29 August 2017	17:00	Final

== Results ==
Rank	Athlete	Score			Total
Rank	Athlete	D Score	E Score	Pen.	Total
1st place, gold medalist(s)	Yulia Bravikova (RUS)	8.000	8.600	0.050	16.550
2nd place, silver medalist(s)	Ekaterina Selezneva (RUS)	7.100	7.850		14.950
3rd place, bronze medalist(s)	Takana Tatsuzawa (JPN)	6.400	8.200		14.600
4	Serena Lu (USA)	6.800	7.700		14.500
5	Uzume Kawasaki (JPN)	6.700	7.350		14.050
6	Hanna Bazhko (BLR)	5.900	8.100		14.000
7	Selina Zhumatayeva (KAZ)	6.400	7.400		13.800
8	Kateryna Lutsenko (UKR)	6.000	7.800	0.050	13.750
