= Gymnastics at the 2017 Summer Universiade – Women's rhythmic individual clubs =

Women's rhythmic individual clubs at the 2017 Summer Universiade
- Venue: Taipei Nangang Exhibition Center
- Date: 29 August
- Competitors: 8 from 5 nations

Medalists
gold medal	Yulia Bravikova	Russia
silver medal	Kateryna Lutsenko	Ukraine
bronze medal	Ekaterina Selezneva	Russia

The Women's clubs gymnastics at the 2017 Summer Universiade in Taipei was held on 29 August at the Taipei Nangang Exhibition Center.

== Schedule ==
All times are Taiwan Standard Time (UTC+08:00).

Date	Time	Event
Tuesday, 29 August 2017	16:30	Final

== Results ==
Rank	Athlete	Score			Total
Rank	Athlete	D Score	E Score	Pen.	Total
1st place, gold medalist(s)	Yulia Bravikova (RUS)	9.200	8.700		17.900
2nd place, silver medalist(s)	Kateryna Lutsenko (UKR)	8.200	8.325		16.525
3rd place, bronze medalist(s)	Ekaterina Selezneva (RUS)	8.000	8.100		16.100
4	Mariya Trubach (BLR)	7.700	8.125		15.825
5	Takana Tatsuzawa (JPN)	7.600	7.650		15.250
6	Yana Yarosh (UKR)	7.600	7.050		14.650
7	Rut Castillo (MEX)	7.000	7.150		14.150
8	Hanna Bazhko (BLR)	6.100	7.500		13.600
