= Gymnastics at the 2017 Summer Universiade – Women's rhythmic individual ball =

Women's rhythmic individual ball at the 2017 Summer Universiade
- Venue: Taipei Nangang Exhibition Center
- Date: 29 August
- Competitors: 8 from 5 nations

Medalists
gold medal	Ekaterina Selezneva	Russia
silver medal	Yulia Bravikova	Russia
bronze medal	Mariya Trubach	Belarus

The Women's ball gymnastics at the 2017 Summer Universiade in Taipei was held on 29 August at the Taipei Nangang Exhibition Center.

== Schedule ==
All times are Taiwan Standard Time (UTC+08:00).

Date	Time	Event
Tuesday, 29 August 2017	14:30	Final

== Results ==
Rank	Athlete	Score			Total
Rank	Athlete	D Score	E Score	Pen.	Total
1st place, gold medalist(s)	Ekaterina Selezneva (RUS)	8.500	8.500		17.000
2nd place, silver medalist(s)	Yulia Bravikova (RUS)	8.200	8.550		16.750
3rd place, bronze medalist(s)	Mariya Trubach (BLR)	8.500	7.950		16.450
4	Serena Ji Lu (USA)	8.000	8.175		16.175
5	Selina Zhumatayeva (KAZ)	7.700	8.000		15.700
6	Kateryna Lutsenko (UKR)	6.700	8.450		15.150
7	Hanna Bazhko (BLR)	7.600	7.200		14.800
8	Yana Yarosh (UKR)	7.000	7.100		14.100
