= Gymnastics at the 2017 Summer Universiade – Women's uneven bars =

Women's uneven bars at the 2017 Summer Universiade
- Venue: Taipei Nangang Exhibition Center
- Date: 23 August
- Competitors: 8 from 5 nations

Medalists
gold medal	Daria Spiridonova	Russia
silver medal	Kim Bùi	Germany
bronze medal	Ellie Black	Canada

The Women's uneven bars gymnastics at the 2017 Summer Universiade in Taipei was held on 23 August at the Taipei Nangang Exhibition Center.

== Schedule ==
All times are Taiwan Standard Time (UTC+08:00)

Date	Time	Event
Wednesday, 23 August 2017	12:30	Final

== Results ==
Rank	Athlete	Score			Total
Rank	Athlete	D Score	E Score	Pen.	Total
1st place, gold medalist(s)	Daria Spiridonova (RUS)	5.700	8.533		14.233
2nd place, silver medalist(s)	Kim Bùi (GER)	5.800	8.266		14.066
3rd place, bronze medalist(s)	Ellie Black (CAN)	5.700	8.266		13.966
4	Yuki Uchiyama (JPN)	5.500	8.333		13.833
5	Larisa Iordache (ROU)	5.500	8.300		13.800
5	Evgeniya Shelgunova (RUS)	5.500	8.300		13.800
7	Leah Grießer (GER)	5.400	8.200		13.600
8	Yumika Nakamura (JPN)	5.100	8.200		13.300
