= Diving at the 2017 Summer Universiade – Women's team classification =

Women's team classification at the Universiade
- Venue: University of Taipei (Tianmu) Shin-hsin Hall B1 Diving Pool
- Dates: 27 August 2017
- Teams: 19

Medalists
| 1st place, gold medalist(s) | | North Korea (PRK) |
| 2nd place, silver medalist(s) | | Russia (RUS) |
| 3rd place, bronze medalist(s) | | Japan (JPN) |

The women's team classification diving event at the 2017 Summer Universiade was contested from August 27 at the University of Taipei (Tianmu) Shin-hsin Hall B1 Diving Pool in Taipei, Taiwan.

== Schedule ==
All times are Taiwan Standard Time (UTC+08:00)

| Date | Time | Event |
|---|---|---|
| Sunday, 27 August 2017 | 16:55 | Final |

== Results ==
| Rank | Team | 1M | | 3M | | 10M | | 3MS | 10MS | M3MS | M10MS | MT | Total |
|---|---|---|---|---|---|---|---|---|---|---|---|---|---|
| 1st place, gold medalist(s) | North Korea (PRK) | 245.25 | 240.90 | 248.90 | 237.60 | 385.60 | 314.10 | 266.16 | 303.54 | 127.83 | 168.39 | 158.45 | 2696.72 |
| 2nd place, silver medalist(s) | Russia (RUS) | 264.65 | 246.80 | 262.65 | 262.05 | 271.35 | 224.95 | 270.30 | 263.07 | 133.25 | 152.40 | 168.53 | 2519.99 |
| 3rd place, bronze medalist(s) | Japan (JPN) | 217.45 | 210.75 | 274.95 | 257.60 | 288.45 | 244.85 | 232.80 | 231.96 | 133.59 | | 174.15 | 2266.55 |
| 4 | Mexico (MEX) | 254.45 | 254.40 | 303.55 | 271.75 | 265.30 | | 290.22 | | 151.01 | 124.89 | 175.65 | 2091.22 |
| 5 | United States (USA) | 238.05 | 234.55 | 273.80 | 267.95 | 299.65 | | 268.17 | | 137.10 | 134.76 | 162.03 | 2016.06 |
| 6 | South Korea (KOR) | 255.05 | 236.25 | 284.75 | 257.55 | 315.25 | | 280.89 | | 131.91 | | 173.93 | 1935.58 |
| 7 | Germany (GER) | 248.40 | 247.00 | 242.40 | 227.60 | 233.05 | | 253.86 | | 132.60 | 130.44 | 176.58 | 1891.93 |
| 8 | Ukraine (UKR) | 231.65 | 213.70 | 295.95 | 271.25 | 251.60 | | 254.40 | | 142.32 | | 199.45 | 1860.32 |
| 9 | Canada (CAN) | 236.20 | 180.45 | 255.70 | 220.60 | 288.20 | | | | | | 181.40 | 1600.80 |
| 10 | Italy (ITA) | 230.80 | 196.50 | 241.35 | | 221.05 | 201.40 | | 226.02 | 138.57 | | 144.40 | 1600.09 |
| 11 | Australia (AUS) | 222.95 | | 249.40 | | 277.00 | 251.50 | | 297.84 | | 132.27 | | 1430.96 |
| 12 | Brazil (BRA) | 249.05 | 197.85 | 256.15 | 204.55 | | | 265.02 | | | | | 1172.62 |
| 13 | Sweden (SWE) | 226.10 | | 263.90 | | | | | | | | | 490.00 |
| 14 | Chinese Taipei (TPE) | 152.75 | | 180.15 | | | | | | 88.76 | | | 421.66 |
| 15 | Lithuania (LTU) | 206.10 | | 214.30 | | | | | | | | | 420.40 |
| 16 | Romania (ROU) | 202.30 | | 211.90 | | | | | | | | | 414.20 |
| 17 | Ireland (IRL) | 185.25 | | 217.85 | | | | | | | | | 403.10 |
| 18 | Macau (MAC) | | | | | | | | 187.74 | | | | 187.74 |
| 19 | Philippines (PHI) | 182.95 | | | | | | | | | | | 182.95 |
