= Gymnastics at the 2017 Summer Universiade – Women's rhythmic individual hoop =

Women's rhythmic individual hoop at the 2017 Summer Universiade
- Venue: Taipei Nangang Exhibition Center
- Date: 29 August
- Competitors: 8 from 5 nations

Medalists
gold medal	Yulia Bravikova	Russia
silver medal	Ekaterina Selezneva	Russia
bronze medal	Kateryna Lutsenko	Ukraine

The Women's hoop gymnastics at the 2017 Summer Universiade in Taipei was held on 29 August at the Taipei Nangang Exhibition Center.

== Schedule ==
All times are Taiwan Standard Time (UTC+08:00).

Date	Time	Event
Tuesday, 29 August 2017	14:00	Final

== Results ==
Rank	Athlete	Score			Total
Rank	Athlete	D Score	E Score	Pen.	Total
1st place, gold medalist(s)	Yulia Bravikova (RUS)	9.600	8.850		18.450
2nd place, silver medalist(s)	Ekaterina Selezneva (RUS)	9.000	8.600		17.600
3rd place, bronze medalist(s)	Kateryna Lutsenko (UKR)	8.500	7.900		16.400
4	Takana Tatsuzawa (JPN)	7.700	8.400		16.100
5	Mariya Trubach (BLR)	7.700	7.600		15.300
6	Rut Castillo (MEX)	6.900	8.200		15.100
7	Yana Yarosh (UKR)	5.900	8.050		13.950
8	Uzume Kawasaki (JPN)	6.200	6.900		13.100
