= Roller Sports at the 2017 Summer Universiade – Men's 10000 metres elimination races =

Men's 10000 metres elimination races at the XXIX Summer Universiade
- Venues: Yingfeng Riverside Park Roller Sports Rink (A)
- Dates: 21 August
- Competitors: 23 from 14 nations

Medalists
1st place, gold medalist(s)		Chen Yan-cheng	Chinese Taipei
2nd place, silver medalist(s)		Ko Fu-shiuan	Chinese Taipei
3rd place, bronze medalist(s)		Carlos Esteban Perez Canaval	Colombia

The men's 10000 metres elimination races event at the 2017 Summer Universiade was held on 21 August at the Yingfeng Riverside Park Roller Sports Rink (A).

== Record ==
Category	Athlete	Record	Date	Place
World record	(Italy) Fabio Francolini	14:23.546	23 August 2013	Ostend, Belgium

== Results ==
Rank	Athlete	Labs																						Results
Rank	Athlete	8	10	12	14	16	18	20	22	24	26	28	30	32	34	36	38	40	42	44	46	48	50	Results
1st place, gold medalist(s)	Chen Yan-cheng (TPE)				2	1			2	2	1	2	1	1						1	2	2	3	20 (15:24.274)
2nd place, silver medalist(s)	Ko Fu-shiuan (TPE)	2	2						1					2						2	1	1	2	13
3rd place, bronze medalist(s)	Carlos Esteban Perez Canaval (COL)			1	1	2				1	2	1	2											10
4	Kengo Kawabata (JPN)														2	2	1	2	2					9
5	Thimo Kiesslich (GER)														1	1	2	1	1				1	7
6	Carlos Ivan Franco Perez (COL)							2																2
	Jakob Ulreich (AUT)																							0
	Michal Prokop (CZE)																							0
	Sebastian Mirsch (GER)																							0
	Choi Gwang-ho (KOR)																							0
	Christian Kromoser (AUT)																			EL				EL
	Fabian Istvan Dieterle (HUN)																		EL					EL
13	Katsuki Kato (JPN)	~~1~~	~~1~~															EL						EL
	Alessio Iacono (ITA)																EL							EL
	Claudio Garcia Carrillo (MEX)															EL								EL
	Ben Jesper Sorg (SUI)														EL									EL
	Tomáš Brabenec (CZE)													EL										EL
	Maksim Gutsalov (RUS)												EL											EL
	Miha Remic (SLO)											EL												EL
	Evgenii Pilipenko (RUS)										EL													EL
21	Lee Sang-cheol (KOR)						~~2~~	~~1~~		EL														EL
	Anton Kapustsin (BLR)									EL														EL
23	Giuseppe Bramante (ITA)			~~2~~			~~1~~		EL															EL

Note: EL=Eliminated.
