= Gymnastics at the 2017 Summer Universiade – Women's vault =

Women's vault at the 2017 Summer Universiade
- Venue: Taipei Nangang Exhibition Center
- Date: 23 August
- Competitors: 8 from 6 nations

Medalists
gold medal	Brittany Rogers	Canada
silver medal	Lilia Akhaimova	Russia
bronze medal	Maria Paseka	Russia

The Women's vault gymnastics at the 2017 Summer Universiade in Taipei was held on 23 August at the Taipei Nangang Exhibition Center.

== Schedule ==
All times are Taiwan Standard Time (UTC+08:00)

Date	Time	Event
Wednesday, 23 August 2017	11:30	Final

== Results ==
Rank	Athlete	Vault	Score				Total
Rank	Athlete	Vault	D Score	E Score	Pen.	Score	Total
1st place, gold medalist(s)	Brittany Rogers (CAN)	1	5.400	9.100		14.500	14.250
1st place, gold medalist(s)	Brittany Rogers (CAN)	2	5.200	8.800		14.000	14.250
2nd place, silver medalist(s)	Lilia Akhaimova (RUS)	1	5.400	9.000	0.100	14.300	13.983
2nd place, silver medalist(s)	Lilia Akhaimova (RUS)	2	4.600	9.066		13.666	13.983
3rd place, bronze medalist(s)	Maria Paseka (RUS)	1	5.800	8.200	0.100	13.900	13.916
3rd place, bronze medalist(s)	Maria Paseka (RUS)	2	5.200	8.833	0.100	13.933	13.916
4	Ellie Black (CAN)	1	5.400	8.941		14.341	13.853
4	Ellie Black (CAN)	2	5.200	8.466	0.300	13.366	13.853
5	Gabriela Janik (POL)	1	4.800	8.600		13.400	13.400
5	Gabriela Janik (POL)	2	4.800	8.700	0.100	13.400	13.400
6	Yamilet Peña (DOM)	1	5.400	8.400	0.100	13.700	13.266
6	Yamilet Peña (DOM)	2	5.000	7.933	0.100	12.833	13.266
7	Dorien Eva Motten (BEL)	1	5.000	8.133	0.300	12.833	13.183
7	Dorien Eva Motten (BEL)	2	4.800	8.733		13.533	13.183
8	Elisabeth Geurts (NED)	1	5.000	8.833		13.833	12.733
8	Elisabeth Geurts (NED)	2	4.200	7.733	0.300	11.633	12.733
