= Roller Sports at the 2017 Summer Universiade – Women's 15000 metres elimination races =

Men's 15000 metres elimination races at the XXIX Summer Universiade
- Venues: Yingfeng Riverside Park Roller Sports Rink (A)
- Dates: 22 August
- Competitors: 20 from 12 nations

Medalists
| 1st place, gold medalist(s) | | Yang Ho-chen | Chinese Taipei |
| 2nd place, silver medalist(s) | | Li Meng-chu | Chinese Taipei |
| 3rd place, bronze medalist(s) | | Maria Camila Gil Taborda | Colombia |

The women's 15000 metres elimination races event at the 2017 Summer Universiade was held on 22 August at the Yingfeng Riverside Park Roller Sports Rink (A).

== Record ==
| Category | Athlete | Record | Date | Place |
|---|---|---|---|---|
| World record | (Italy) Laura Lardani | 23:47.549 | 19 September 2009 | Haining, China |

=== Final ===
| Rank | Athlete | Results |
|---|---|---|
| 1st place, gold medalist(s) | Yang Ho-chen (TPE) | 26:57.916 |
| 2nd place, silver medalist(s) | Li Meng-chu (TPE) | 26:58.034 |
| 3rd place, bronze medalist(s) | Maria Camila Gil Taborda (COL) | 26:58.964 |
| 4 | Daniela Andrea Lindarte Garaviz (COL) | 26:59.051 |
| 5 | Mayu Goto (JPN) | 27:00.440 |
| | Dominika Gardi (HUN) | EL72 |
| | Nadja Wenger (SUI) | EL70 |
| | Yuri Yoshino (JPN) | EL68 |
| | Yu Ga-ram (KOR) | EL66 |
| | Carlotta Camarin (ITA) | EL64 |
| | Park Min-jeong (KOR) | EL62 |
| | Agnese Cerri (ITA) | EL60 |
| | Berenice Molina Villafuerte (MEX) | EL58 |
| | Blanka Santha (HUN) | EL56 |
| | Rina Jasmin Von Burg (SUI) | EL54 |
| | Lotte Kaars (NZL) | EL34 |
| | Anna Seldimirova (RUS) | EL34 |
| | Anna Pristalova (RUS) | EL26 |
| | Katharina Isabe Rumpus (GER) | DNS |
| | Tadeja Donka (SLO) | DNS |

Note: ELN=Eliminated on N ^{th} lab.
