= Roller Sports at the 2017 Summer Universiade – Women's speed slalom =

Women's speed slalom at the XXIX Summer Universiade
- Venues: Yingfeng Riverside Park Roller Sports Rink (A)
- Dates: 25 August
- Competitors: 6 from 3 nations

Medalists
1st place, gold medalist(s)		Liang Hsuan-min	Chinese Taipei
2nd place, silver medalist(s)		Wang Jia-wei	Chinese Taipei
3rd place, bronze medalist(s)		Kristina Lysenko	Russia

The women's speed slalom event at the 2017 Summer Universiade was held on 25 August at the Yingfeng Riverside Park Roller Sports Rink (A).

== Results ==
Qualified for the final

=== Preliminary Round ===
Rank	Athlete	Results
1	Wang Jia-wei (TPE)	4.590
2	Liang Hsuan-min (TPE)	4.896
3	Kristina Lysenko (RUS)	5.253
4	Oksana Pervenenok (RUS)	5.622
	María Fernanda Timms (COL)	DSQ
	Mayerly Amaya Villamizar (COL)	DSQ

=== Semifinals ===
Semifinals
1	Wang Jia-wei (TPE)	5.135	5.195
4	Oksana Pervenenok (RUS)	6.293	6.233
3	Kristina Lysenko (RUS)	5.505	5.539
2	Liang Hsuan-min (TPE)	5.183	5.369

Final
1	Wang Jia-wei (TPE)	5.163	5.218	5.974
2	Liang Hsuan-min (TPE)	5.728	5.077	5.114
Consolation final
4	Oksana Pervenenok (RUS)	6.095	6.275
3	Kristina Lysenko (RUS)	6.034	5.975
