= Gymnastics at the 2017 Summer Universiade – Women's rhythmic group 5 hoops =

Women's rhythmic group 5 hoops at the 2017 Summer Universiade
- Venue: Taipei Nangang Exhibition Center
- Date: 29 August
- Competitors: 40 from 8 nations

Medalists
gold medal	Alexandra Korchagina; Daria Gorbacheva; Elizaveta Minikhina; Ralina Rakipova; Valeriya Osikova	Russia
silver medal	Asuka Ono; Ayano Sato; Nanase Hori; Natsumi Morino; Yukari Narimatsu	Japan
bronze medal	Ham Sue-ae; Kang Jin-a; Mun Kyong-wi; Ri Hye-song; Sin Su-rim	North Korea

The Women's 5 hoops gymnastics at the 2017 Summer Universiade in Taipei was held on 29 August at the Taipei Nangang Exhibition Center.

== Schedule ==
All times are Taiwan Standard Time (UTC+08:00).

Date	Time	Event
Tuesday, 29 August 2017	15:00	Final

== Results ==
Rank	Team	Score			Total
Rank	Team	D Score	E Score	Pen.	Total
1st place, gold medalist(s)	Russia (RUS)	9.500	8.025		17.525
2nd place, silver medalist(s)	Japan (JPN)	9.900	7.450		17.350
3rd place, bronze medalist(s)	North Korea (PRK)	8.900	7.650		16.550
4	Chinese Taipei (TPE)	9.000	6.900		15.900
5	China (CHN)	8.700	6.800		15.500
6	Ukraine (UKR)	8.600	5.800		14.400
7	Hungary (HUN)	7.400	5.300		12.700
8	South Korea (KOR)	6.900	4.050	0.600	10.350
