= Roller Sports at the 2017 Summer Universiade – Men's marathon =

Men's marathon at the XXIX Summer Universiade
- Venues: Ren' ai Road, Taipei City (Start: Ketagalan Boulevard)
- Dates: 26 August
- Competitors: 47 from 14 nations

Medalists
1st place, gold medalist(s)		Choi Gwang-ho	South Korea
2nd place, silver medalist(s)		Carlos Esteban Perez Canaval	Colombia
3rd place, bronze medalist(s)		Giuseppe Bramante	Italy

The men's marathon event at the 2017 Summer Universiade was held on 26 August at the Ren' ai Road, Taipei City and started at Ketagalan Boulevard.

== Record ==
Category	Athlete	Record	Date	Place
World record	(Switzerland) Roger Schneider	58:00.174	2 August 2003	Abano Terme, Italy

== Results ==
Rank	Athlete	Results
1st place, gold medalist(s)	Choi Gwang-ho (KOR)	1:07:15.138
2nd place, silver medalist(s)	Carlos Esteban Perez Canaval (COL)	1:07:15.163
3rd place, bronze medalist(s)	Giuseppe Bramante (ITA)	1:07:15.228
4	Carlos Ivan Franco Perez (COL)	1:07:15.243
5	Tempei Zama (JPN)	1:07:15.466
6	Ko Fu-shiuan (TPE)	1:07:15.532
7	Thimo Kiesslich (GER)	1:07:16.908
8	Chuang Shao-chun (TPE)	1:07:16.950
9	Katsuki Kato (JPN)	1:07:21.438
10	Fabian Istvan Dieterle (HUN)	1:07:21.506
11	Michal Prokop (CZE)	1:07:22.434
12	Claudio Garcia Carrillo (MEX)	1:07:23.385
13	Christian Kromoser (AUT)	1:07:38.237
14	Kengo Kawabata (JPN)	1:08:00.810
15	Etienne Kris Ramali (GER)	1:08:01.468
16	Tobias Hecht (GER)	1:08:22.377
17	Jakob Ulreich (AUT)	1:09:44.423
18	Alessio Iacono (ITA)	1:10:14.423
19	Ben Jesper Sorg (SUI)	1:10:15.611
20	Štěpán Šváb (CZE)	1:10:20.587
21	Nils Fischer (GER)	1:10:38.452
22	Tomáš Brabenec (CZE)	1:12:40.765
23	Cristian Sartorato (ITA)	1:14:20.566
24	Thomas Petutschnigg (AUT)	1:16:34.521
25	Maksim Gutsalov (RUS)	1:19:45.774
26	Huang Yu-lin (TPE)	1:19:45.885
	Anton Kapustsin (BLR)	DNF
	Cesar Enrique Nunez Almanze (COL)	DNF
	Jaime Rodrigo Uribe Mogollon (COL)	DNF
	Johan Sebastian Cabrera Orjuela (COL)	DNF
	Matej Pravda (CZE)	DNF
	Sebastian Mirsch (GER)	DNF
	Mattia Diamanti (ITA)	DNF
	Heo Bong (KOR)	DNF
	Hong Seung-gi (KOR)	DNF
	Jeong Byeong-kwan (KOR)	DNF
	Kim Jin-young (KOR)	DNF
	Lee Sang-cheol (KOR)	DNF
	Daniil Obukhov (RUS)	DNF
	Evgenii Pilipenko (RUS)	DNF
	Gleb Pervov (RUS)	DNF
	Kiriil Vinokurov (RUS)	DNF
	Sergey Fokin (RUS)	DNF
	Miha Remic (SLO)	DNF
	Chen Yan-cheng (TPE)	DNF
	Kao Mao-chieh (TPE)	DNF
	Sung Ching-yang (TPE)	DNF
