= Diving at the 2017 Summer Universiade – Women's synchronized 10 metre platform =

Women's synchronized 10 metre platform at the Universiade
- Venue: University of Taipei (Tianmu) Shin-hsin Hall B1 Diving Pool
- Dates: 21 August 2017
- Competitors: 12 from 6 nations

Medalists
1st place, gold medalist(s)		Kim Kuk-hyang; Kim Un-hyang	North Korea
2nd place, silver medalist(s)		Emily Kate Meaney; Brittany Mae O'Brien	Australia
3rd place, bronze medalist(s)		Yulia Tikhomirova; Iuliia Timoshinina	Russia

The women's synchronized 10 metre platform diving event at the 2017 Summer Universiade was contested on August 21 at the University of Taipei (Tianmu) Shin-hsin Hall B1 Diving Pool in Taipei, Taiwan.

== Schedule ==
All times are Taiwan Standard Time (UTC+08:00)

Date	Time	Event
Monday, 21 August 2017	16:15	Final

== Results ==
=== Final ===
Rank	Athlete	Dive					Total
Rank	Athlete	1	2	3	4	5	Total
1st place, gold medalist(s)	Kim Kuk-hyang (PRK); Kim Un-hyang (PRK)	52.20	52.20	65.70	58.56	74.88	303.54
2nd place, silver medalist(s)	Emily Kate Meaney (AUS); Brittany Mae O'Brien (AUS)	47.40	48.60	68.40	61.44	72.00	297.84
3rd place, bronze medalist(s)	Yulia Tikhomirova (RUS); Iuliia Timoshinina (RUS)	44.40	39.60	45.03	63.00	71.04	263.07
4	Haruka Enomoto (JPN); Hana Kaneto (JPN)	48.60	45.60	48.72	41.16	47.88	231.96
5	Paola Flaminio (ITA); Flavia Pallotta (ITA)	35.40	42.00	44.52	51.84	52.26	226.02
6	Leong Sut In (MAC); Leong Sut Chan (MAC)	42.00	36.00	42.09	35.25	32.40	187.74
