= Gymnastics at the 2017 Summer Universiade – Men's horizontal bar =

Men's horizontal bar at the 2017 Summer Universiade
- Venue: Taipei Nangang Exhibition Center
- Date: 23 August
- Competitors: 8 from 5 nations

Medalists
gold medal	Axel Augis	France
silver medal	Vladislav Poliashov	Russia
bronze medal	Wataru Tanigawa	Japan

The Men's horizontal bar Gymnastics at the 2017 Summer Universiade in Taipei was held on 23 August at the Taipei Nangang Exhibition Center.

== Schedule ==
All times are Taiwan Standard Time (UTC+08:00)

Date	Time	Event
Wednesday, 23 August 2017	18:00	Final

== Results ==
Rank	Athlete	Score			Total
Rank	Athlete	D Score	E Score	Pen.	Total
1st place, gold medalist(s)	Axel Augis (FRA)	5.800	8.366		14.166
2nd place, silver medalist(s)	Vladislav Poliashov (RUS)	5.600	8.500		14.100
3rd place, bronze medalist(s)	Wataru Tanigawa (JPN)	5.500	8.366		13.866
4	Alexey Rostov (RUS)	6.200	7.533		13.733
5	Michael Mercieca (AUS)	5.300	7.600		12.900
6	Marios Georgiou (CYP)	4.800	7.566		12.366
7	Mitchell Morgans (AUS)	6.300	5.933		12.233
8	Tomomasa Hasegawa (JPN)	5.700	6.500		12.200
