= Roller Sports at the 2017 Summer Universiade – Men's 15000 metres elimination races =

Men's 15000 metres elimination races at the XXIX Summer Universiade
- Venues: Yingfeng Riverside Park Roller Sports Rink (A)
- Dates: 22 August
- Competitors: 23 from 14 nations

Medalists
1st place, gold medalist(s)		Carlos Ivan Franco Perez	Colombia
2nd place, silver medalist(s)		Ko Fu-shiuan	Chinese Taipei
3rd place, bronze medalist(s)		Carlos Esteban Perez Canaval	Colombia

The men's 15000 metres elimination races event at the 2017 Summer Universiade was held on 22 August at the Yingfeng Riverside Park Roller Sports Rink (A).

== Record ==
Category	Athlete	Record	Date	Place
World record	(New Zealand) Peter Michael	22:02.458	25 August 2013	Ostend, Belgium

=== Final ===
Rank	Athlete	Results
1st place, gold medalist(s)	Carlos Ivan Franco Perez (COL)	24:09.630
2nd place, silver medalist(s)	Ko Fu-shiuan (TPE)	24:09.763
3rd place, bronze medalist(s)	Carlos Esteban Perez Canaval (COL)	24:09.999
4	Chuang Shao-chun (TPE)	24:10.066
	Giuseppe Bramante (ITA)	
	Choi Gwang-ho (KOR)	EL72
	Lee Sang-cheol (KOR)	EL70
	Alessio Iacono (ITA)	EL68
	Sebastian Mirsch (GER)	EL66
	Katsuki Kato (JPN)	EL64
	Christian Kromoser (AUT)	EL62
	Michal Prokop (CZE)	EL60
	Claudio Garcia Carrillo (MEX)	EL58
	Kengo Kawabata (JPN)	EL56
	Tobias Hecht (GER)	EL54
	Jakob Ulreich (AUT)	EL52
	Ben Jesper Sorg (SUI)	EL50
	Fabian Istvan Dieterle (HUN)	EL48
	Štěpán Šváb (CZE)	EL46
	Anton Kapustsin (BLR)	EL44
	Miha Remic (SLO)	EL42
	Maksim Gutsalov (RUS)	EL40
	Evgenii Pilipenko (RUS)	EL38

Note: ELN=Eliminated on N ^{th} lab.
