= Roller Sports at the 2017 Summer Universiade – Women's marathon =

Men's marathon at the XXIX Summer Universiade
- Venues: Ren' ai Road, Taipei City (Start: Ketagalan Boulevard)
- Dates: 26 August 2017
- Competitors: 47 from 14 nations

Medalists
1st place, gold medalist(s)		Yang Ho-chen	Chinese Taipei
2nd place, silver medalist(s)		Li Meng-chu	Chinese Taipei
3rd place, bronze medalist(s)		Maria Camila Guerra Guevara	Colombia

The men's marathon event at the 2017 Summer Universiade was held on 26 August at the Ren' ai Road, Taipei City and start at Ketagalan Boulevard.

== Record ==
Category	Athlete	Record	Date	Place
World record	(Italy) A. Susmeli	1:10:00.431	2 August 2003	Abano Terme, Italy

== Results ==
Rank	Athlete	Results
1st place, gold medalist(s)	Yang Ho-chen (TPE)	1:27:43.622
2nd place, silver medalist(s)	Li Meng-chu (TPE)	1:27:43.705
3rd place, bronze medalist(s)	Maria Camila Guerra Guevara (COL)	1:27:44.399
4	Katharina Isabe Rumpus (GER)	1:27:44.557
5	Chen Ying-chu (TPE)	1:27:44.629
6	Park Min-jeong (KOR)	1:27:44.778
7	Yu Ga-ram (KOR)	1:27:44.997
8	Tsai Pin-hsuan (TPE)	1:27:45.798
9	Wang Yi-shan (TPE)	1:27:45.948
10	Daniela Andrea Lindarte Garaviz (COL)	1:27:46.001
11	Carlotta Camarin (ITA)	1:27:46.094
12	Maria Camila Gil Taborda (COL)	1:27:46.231
13	Cheong Hye-soo (KOR)	1:27:46.286
14	Agnese Cerri (ITA)	1:27:46.440
15	Dominika Gardi (HUN)	1:27:46.670
16	Hsu Ruo-yun (TPE)	1:27:47.412
17	Blanka Santha (HUN)	1:27:47.807
18	Yuri Yoshino (JPN)	1:27:47.860
19	Nadja Wenger (SUI)	1:27:48.407
20	Berenice Molina Villafuerte (MEX)	1:27:50.462
21	Rina Jasmin Von Burg (SUI)	1:27:51.336
22	Reka Szabina Toeroek (HUN)	1:27:53.830
23	Eleonora Kopilovic (HUN)	1:28:02.668
24	Mayerly Amaya Villamizar (COL)	1:28:15.845
25	Kira Yasutaka (JPN)	1:28:16.353
26	Mayu Goto (JPN)	1:28:30.745
27	Lotte Kaars (NZL)	1:28:48.682
28	Anna Pristalova (RUS)	1:31:44.785
29	Anna Seldimirova (RUS)	1:31:44.898
30	Daria Gorbatenko (RUS)	1:33:45.770
	Karen Dayanna Restrepo Rengifo (COL)	DNF
	María Fernanda Timms (COL)	DNF
	Benedetta Rossini (ITA)	DNF
	An Yi-seul (KOR)	DNF
	Jeong Eun-chae (KOR)	DNF
	Elena Trandafilova (RUS)	DNF
	Ekaterina Nemilostiva (RUS)	DNF
	Elizaveta Luzhbina (RUS)	DNF
	Tadeja Donka (SLO)	DNF
	Shin So-yeong (KOR)	DNS
	Jana Linda Von Burg (SUI)	DNS
