= Roller Sports at the 2017 Summer Universiade – Women's 10000 metres elimination races =

Women's 10000 metres elimination races at the XXIX Summer Universiade
- Venues: Yingfeng Riverside Park Roller Sports Rink (A)
- Dates: 21 August
- Competitors: 21 from 13 nations

Medalists
1st place, gold medalist(s)		Yang Ho-chen	Chinese Taipei
2nd place, silver medalist(s)		Li Meng-chu	Chinese Taipei
3rd place, bronze medalist(s)		Yu Ga-ram	South Korea

The women's 10000 metres elimination races event at the 2017 Summer Universiade was held on 21 August at the Yingfeng Riverside Park Roller Sports Rink (A).

== Record ==
Category	Athlete	Record	Date	Place
World record	(Chinese Taipei) Yang Ho-chen	15:26.970	24 August 2013	Ostend, Belgium

== Results ==
Rank	Athlete	Labs																						Results
Rank	Athlete	8	10	12	14	16	18	20	22	24	26	28	30	32	34	36	38	40	42	44	46	48	50	Results
1st place, gold medalist(s)	Yang Ho-chen (TPE)		2	2	2		1		2	2	1	2		1	2		1		1	1	2		1	23 (16:10.958)
2nd place, silver medalist(s)	Li Meng-chu (TPE)		1	1	1				1		2	1	2		1	1						2	3	16 (16:04.184)
3rd place, bronze medalist(s)	Yu Ga-ram (KOR)	2					2			1				2			2		2	2	1		2	16 (16:08.167)
4	Daniela Andrea Lindarte Garaviz (COL)					2		2					1			2		1						8
5	Agnese Cerri (ITA)	1						1														1		3
6	Cheong Hye-soo (KOR)																	2						2
7	Maria Camila Guerra Guevara (COL)					1																		1
	Mayu Goto (JPN)																					EL		EL
	Yuri Yoshino (JPN)																				EL			EL
	Katharina Isabe Rumpus (GER)																			EL				EL
	Dominika Gardi (HUN)																		EL					EL
	Wong Vanessa Natalie (HKG)																	EL						EL
	Berenice Molina Villafuerte (MEX)																EL							EL
	Nadja Wenger (SUI)															EL								EL
	Carlotta Camarin (ITA)														EL									EL
	Jana Linda Von Burg (SUI)													EL										EL
	Reka Szabina Toeroek (HUN)												EL											EL
	Lotte Kaars (NZL)											EL												EL
	Anna Pristalova (RUS)										EL													EL
	Tadeja Donka (SLO)									EL														EL
	Anna Seldimirova (RUS)								EL															EL

Note: EL=Eliminated.
