= Gymnastics at the 2017 Summer Universiade – Women's balance beam =

Women's balance beam at the 2017 Summer Universiade
- Venue: Taipei Nangang Exhibition Center
- Date: August 23, 2017
- Competitors: 8 from 5 nations

Medalists
gold medal	Ellie Black	Canada
silver medal	Natsumi Sasada	Japan
bronze medal	Larisa Iordache	Romania

The Women's balance beam gymnastics at the 2017 Summer Universiade in Taipei was held on 23 August at the Taipei Nangang Exhibition Center.

== Schedule ==
All times are Taiwan Standard Time (UTC+08:00)

Date	Time	Event
Wednesday, 23 August 2017	16:30	Final

== Results ==
Rank	Athlete	Score			Total
Rank	Athlete	D Score	E Score	Pen.	Total
1st place, gold medalist(s)	Ellie Black (CAN)	5.800	8.333		14.133
2nd place, silver medalist(s)	Natsumi Sasada (JPN)	5.600	8.233		13.833
3rd place, bronze medalist(s)	Larisa Iordache (ROU)	6.100	7.566		13.666
4	Evgeniya Shelgunova (RUS)	5.400	7.966		13.366
5	Brittany Rogers (CAN)	5.300	8.066	0.100	13.266
6	Asuka Teramoto (JPN)	5.800	7.433		13.233
7	Adela Šajn (SLO)	4.800	8.133		12.933
8	Daria Spiridonova (RUS)	4.700	7.833		12.533
