= Gymnastics at the 2017 Summer Universiade – Men's rings =

Men's rings at the 2017 Summer Universiade
- Venue: Taipei Nangang Exhibition Center
- Date: 23 August
- Competitors: 8 from 6 nations

Medalists
gold medal	Artur Tovmasyan	Armenia
silver medal	İbrahim Çolak	Turkey
bronze medal	Oleg Verniaiev	Ukraine

The Men's rings Gymnastics at the 2017 Summer Universiade in Taipei was held on 23 August at the Taipei Nangang Exhibition Center.

== Schedule ==
All times are Taiwan Standard Time (UTC+08:00)

Date	Time	Event
Wednesday, 23 August 2017	13:00	Final

== Results ==
Rank	Athlete	Score			Total
Rank	Athlete	D Score	E Score	Pen.	Total
1st place, gold medalist(s)	Artur Tovmasyan (ARM)	6.200	8.825		15.025
2nd place, silver medalist(s)	İbrahim Çolak (TUR)	6.200	8.758		14.958
3rd place, bronze medalist(s)	Oleg Verniaiev (UKR)	6.100	8.700		14.800
4	Daniil Kazachkov (RUS)	5.800	8.966		14.766
4	Ilya Kibartas (RUS)	5.800	8.966		14.766
6	Ihor Radivilov (UKR)	6.000	8.466		14.466
7	Fabian DeLuna (MEX)	5.800	8.566		14.366
8	Yu Chao-wei (TPE)	6.000	8.333		14.333
