= Gymnastics at the 2017 Summer Universiade – Women's floor =

Women's floor at the 2017 Summer Universiade
- Venue: Taipei Nangang Exhibition Center
- Date: 23 August
- Competitors: 8 from 5 nations

Medalists
gold medal	Larisa Iordache	Romania
silver medal	Asuka Teramoto	Japan
bronze medal	Lilia Akhaimova	Russia

The Women's floor gymnastics at the 2017 Summer Universiade in Taipei was held on 23 August at the Taipei Nangang Exhibition Center.

== Schedule ==
All times are Taiwan Standard Time (UTC+08:00)

Date	Time	Event
Wednesday, 23 August 2017	17:30	Final

== Results ==
Rank	Athlete	Score			Total
Rank	Athlete	D Score	E Score	Pen.	Total
1st place, gold medalist(s)	Larisa Iordache (ROU)	5.400	8.400		13.800
2nd place, silver medalist(s)	Asuka Teramoto (JPN)	5.400	8.366		13.766
3rd place, bronze medalist(s)	Lilia Akhaimova (RUS)	5.600	8.033	0.100	13.533
4	Ellie Black (CAN)	5.000	8.433		13.433
5	Pauline Tratz (GER)	4.800	8.266		13.066
6	Leah Grießer (GER)	4.800	8.033		12.833
7	Darya Elizarova (RUS)	5.300	6.500		11.800
8	Natsumi Sasada (JPN)	4.900	6.233		11.133
