= Diving at the 2017 Summer Universiade – Mixed synchronized 10 metre platform =

Mixed synchronized 10 metre platform at the Universiade
- Venue: University of Taipei (Tianmu) Shin-hsin Hall B1 Diving Pool
- Dates: 24 August 2017
- Competitors: 12 from 6 nations

Medalists
1st place, gold medalist(s)		Kim Kuk-hyang; Hyon Il-myong	North Korea
2nd place, silver medalist(s)		Nikita Shleikher; Iuliia Timoshinina	Russia
3rd place, bronze medalist(s)		Christopher Joseph Law; Olivia Louise Rosendahl	United States

The mixed synchronized 10 metre platform diving event at the 2017 Summer Universiade was contested on August 24 at the University of Taipei (Tianmu) Shin-hsin Hall B1 Diving Pool in Taipei, Taiwan.

== Schedule ==
All times are Taiwan Standard Time (UTC+08:00)

Date	Time	Event
Thursday, 24 August 2017	13:00	Final

== Results ==
=== Final ===
Rank	Athlete	Dive					Total
Rank	Athlete	1	2	3	4	5	Total
1st place, gold medalist(s)	Kim Kuk-hyang (PRK); Hyon Il-myong (PRK)	50.40	50.40	74.70	79.68	81.60	336.78
2nd place, silver medalist(s)	Nikita Shleikher (RUS); Iuliia Timoshinina (RUS)	47.40	44.40	65.70	77.22	70.08	304.80
3rd place, bronze medalist(s)	Christopher Joseph Law (USA); Olivia Louise Rosendahl (USA)	43.80	44.40	54.60	56.64	70.08	269.52
4	Brittany Mae O'Brien (AUS); Nicholas Malcol Jeffree (AUS)	37.80	40.80	62.10	58.56	65.28	264.54
5	Kieu Trang Duong (GER); Alexander Jan W Lube (GER)	44.40	45.00	55.44	59.40	56.64	260.88
6	Diego Garcia De La Fuente (MEX); Daniela Zambrano (MEX)	44.40	42.00	52.20	53.76	57.42	249.78
