= Roller Sports at the 2017 Summer Universiade – Men's speed slalom =

Men's speed slalom at the XXIX Summer Universiade
- Venues: Yingfeng Riverside Park Roller Sports Rink (A)
- Dates: 25 August
- Competitors: 12 from 8 nations

Medalists
1st place, gold medalist(s)		Pan Yushuo	China
2nd place, silver medalist(s)		Chen Yu-chi	Chinese Taipei
3rd place, bronze medalist(s)		Wu Dong-yan	Chinese Taipei

The men's speed slalom event at the 2017 Summer Universiade was held on 25 August at the Yingfeng Riverside Park Roller Sports Rink (A).

== Results ==
Qualified for the final

=== Preliminary Round ===
Rank	Athlete	Results
1	Wu Dong-yan (TPE)	4.316
2	Gian Marco Rosato (ITA)	4.431
3	Chen Yu-chi (TPE)	4.451
4	Pan Yushuo (CHN)	4.461
5	Ma Pak Hong (HKG)	4.493
6	Lin Chu Lok (HKG)	4.747
7	Lee Jung-yun (KOR)	4.761
8	Alexander Timchenko (RUS)	4.990
9	Lai Liang Gin (SGP)	5.082
10	Egor Kotkov (RUS)	5.397
11	Cesar Enrique Nunez Almanze (COL)	7.606
	Johan Sebastian Cabrera Orjuela (COL)	DSQ

=== Semifinals ===
Semifinals
1	Wu Dong-yan (TPE)	4.677	4.873	5.004
4	Pan Yushuo (CHN)	5.001	4.629	4.885
3	Chen Yu-chi (TPE)	4.844	4.797
2	Gian Marco Rosato (ITA)	5.843	4.877

Final
4	Pan Yushuo (CHN)	4.717	4.916	4.677
3	Chen Yu-chi (TPE)	4.724	4.756	4.703
Consolation final
1	Wu Dong-yan (TPE)	4.735	4.789
2	Gian Marco Rosato (ITA)	5.402	5.245
