= Valentina Kostenko =

Russian judoka (born 1993)

Personal information
- Born: 10 August 1993 (age 32)
- Occupation: Judoka

Sport
- Country: Russia
- Sport: Judo
- Weight class: ‍–‍63 kg
Medal record
Women's judo
Representing Russia
IJF Grand Prix
Silver medal – second place	2018 Antalya	‍–‍63 kg
Bronze medal – third place	2019 Tel Aviv	‍–‍63 kg
Summer Universiade
Bronze medal – third place	2017 Taipei	‍–‍63 kg

Profile at external databases
- IJF: 17356
- JudoInside.com: 67749
- Updated on 21 May 2023

Valentina Kostenko (born 10 August 1993) is a Russian judoka.

Kostenko is the silver medalist of the 2018 Judo Grand Prix Antalya in the ‍–‍63 kg category.
