= Wushu at the 2017 Summer Universiade – Men's sanda 60 kg =

Martial arts competition in Taiwan

Men's sanda 60 kg at the 2017 Summer Universiade
- Venue: Hsinchu County Gym
- Date: August 26–29, 2017

Medalists
gold medal	Erfan Ahangarian (IRI)
silver medal	Fuxiang Zhao (CHN)
bronze medal	Ali Magomedov (RUS)
bronze medal	Sung-hyun Jo (KOR)

The men's sanda 60 kg competition at the 2017 Summer Universiade was held between August 26 and August 29, 2017, at the Hsinchu County Gym, Hsinchu County, Taiwan.

== Schedule ==
Date	Time	Event
26 August 2017	19:30	Elimination round of 16
27 August 2017	19:30	Quarterfinals
28 August 2017	19:30	Semifinals
29 August 2017	19:30	Finals

== Results ==
First round
Sung-Hyun Jo (KOR)
Bye
Mohammad Mohsini (AFG)	0
Lucas Queiroz (BRA)	2
Kai Wa Kan (MAC)	1
Hayk Gasparyan (ARM)	2
Fuxiang Zhao (CHN)	2
Hong Tu Hoang (VIE)	0
Antonio de Vito (ITA)	0
Railin Rizaidin (KAZ)	2
Yusuf Widiyanto (INA)	0
Erfan Ahangarian (IRI)	2
Paris Lee Moran (USA)	2
Earl von Erick Pasno (PHI)	0
Bye
Ali Magomedov (RUS)

Quarter-finals
Sung-hyun Jo (KOR)	2
Lucas Queiroz (BRA)	0
Hayk Gasparyan (ARM)	0
Fuxiang Zhao (CHN)	2
Railin Rizaidin (KAZ)	0
Erfan Ahangarian (IRI)	1
Paris Lee Moran (USA)	0
Ali Magomedov (RUS)	2

Semi-finals
Sung-hyun Jo (KOR)	0
Fuxiang Zhao (CHN)	2
Erfan Ahangarian (IRI)	2
Ali Magomedov (RUS)	0

Final
Fuxiang Zhao (CHN)	0
Erfan Ahangarian (IRI)	2
