= Romania at the 2017 Summer Universiade =

- IOC code: ROU
- NOC: Romanian Olympic Committee

in Taipei, Taiwan 19 – 30 August 2017
- Competitors: 89 in 11 sports
- Medals Ranked 23rd: Gold 3 Silver 2 Bronze 6 Total 11

Summer Universiade appearances
- 1959; 1961; 1963; 1965; 1967; 1970; 1973; 1975; 1977; 1979; 1981; 1983; 1985; 1987; 1989; 1991; 1993; 1995; 1997; 1999; 2001; 2003; 2005; 2007; 2009; 2011; 2013; 2015; 2017; 2019; 2021; 2025; 2027

Romania participated at the 2017 Summer Universiade, in Taipei, Taiwan.

== Medalists ==
Medal	Name	Sport	Event	Date
Gold	Larisa Iordache	Gymnastics	Women's artistic individual all-around	22 August
Gold	Larisa Iordache	Gymnastics	Women's floor	23 August
Gold	Alina Rotaru	Athletics	Women's long jump	24 August
Silver	Nicolae Soare	Athletics	Men's 10,000 metres	24 August
Silver	Alin Firfirică	Athletics	Men's discus throw	28 August
Bronze	Andrei Muntean	Gymnastics	Men's vault	23 August
Bronze	Larisa Iordache	Gymnastics	Women's balance beam	23 August
Bronze	Andrei Gag	Athletics	Men's shot put	23 August
Bronze	Bianca Răzor	Athletics	Women's 400 metres	25 August
Bronze	Anamaria Nesteriuc; Sanda Belgyan; Camelia Florina Gal; Bianca Răzor	Athletics	Women's 4 × 400 metres relay	28 August
Bronze	Bernadette Szőcs	Table tennis	Women's Singles	29 August

=== Medal by sports ===
Medals by sport
Sport	1st place, gold medalist(s)	2nd place, silver medalist(s)	3rd place, bronze medalist(s)	Total
Athletics	1	2	3	6
Gymnastics Artistic	2	0	2	4
Table tennis	0	0	1	1
Total	3	2	6	11
