= Kateryna Lutsenko =

Ukrainian rhythmic gymnast (born 1995)

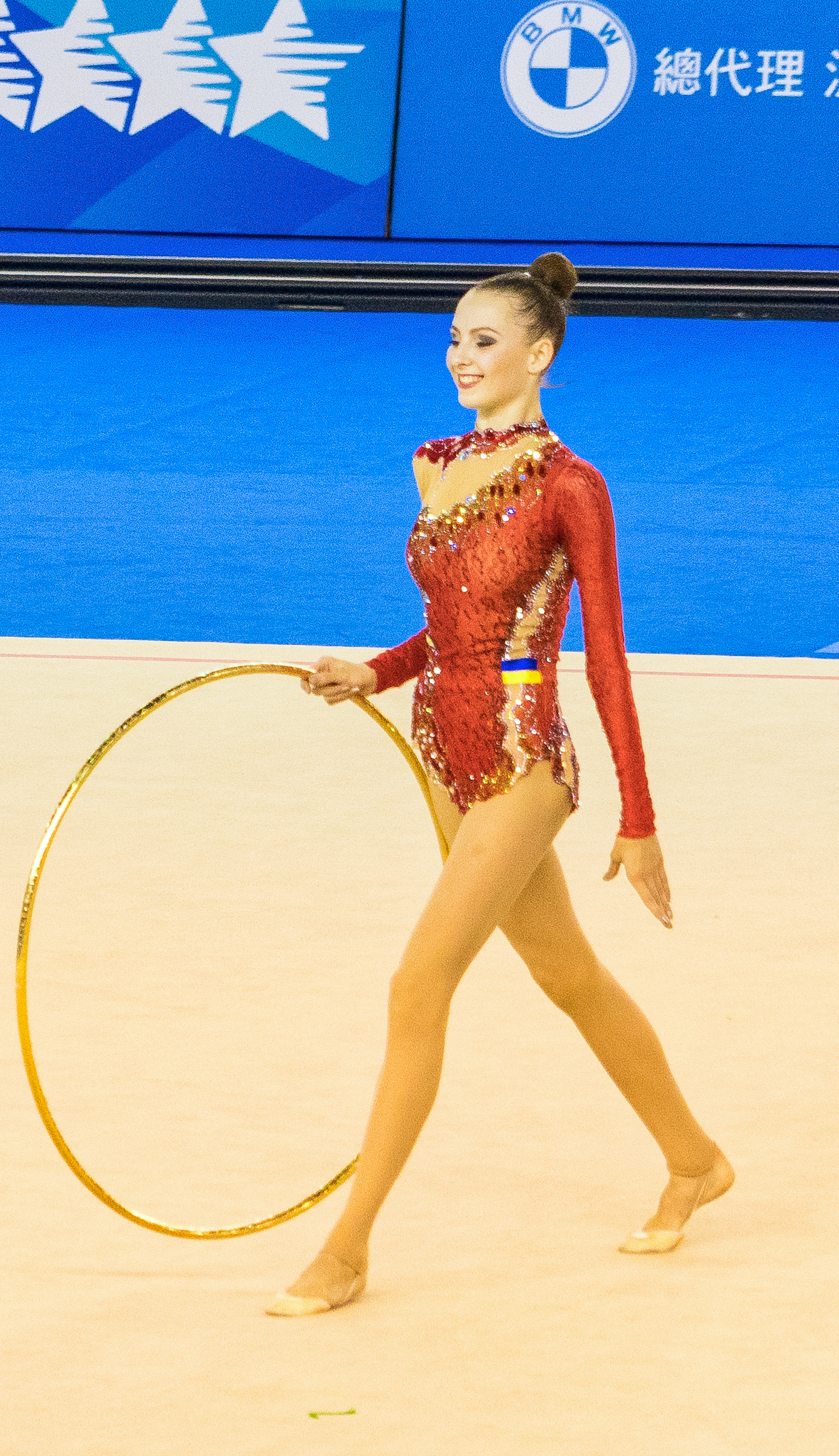
- Lutsenko at the 2017 Summer Universiade

Personal information
- Alternative name: Ekaterina Lutsenko
- Nickname: Katya
- Born: 18 September 1995 (age 30) Dnipropetrovsk, Ukraine

Gymnastics career
- Discipline: Rhythmic gymnastics
- Country represented: Ukraine (2015 - present)
- Gym: Deriugins School
- Head coach: Irina Deriugina
- Assistant coach: Natalia Vladimirovna
- Choreographer: Ireesha Blokhina
Medal record
Rhythmic Gymnastics
Representing Ukraine
Grand Prix Final
Bronze medal – third place	2017 Eilat	All-around
Summer Universiade
Silver medal – second place	2017 Taipei	Clubs
Bronze medal – third place	2017 Taipei	Hoop

Kateryna Lutsenko (Ukrainian: Катерина Ігорівна Луценко, born 18 September 1995 in Dnipropetrovsk, Ukraine) is a Ukrainian individual rhythmic gymnast. She is the 2017 Grand Prix Final All-around bronze medalist.

== Career ==
Lutsenko has been member of the Ukrainian National Team since 2015.

In 2017, she competed at the Holon Senior International tournament winning bronze in the all-around. Lutsenko competed at the 2017 World Cup series in Guadalajara finishing 20th in all-around, in Berlin finishing 22nd in the all-around and in Minsk, finishing 15th in all-around and qualified in the hoop final.

On 27–29 August, Lutsenko competed at the 2017 Summer Universiade finishing 4th in all-around behind Hanna Bazhko, in the apparatus finals: Lutsenko won silver in clubs, bronze in hoop, finished 6th in ball and 8th in ribbon. On 5–6 November Lutsenko competed at the 2017 Dalia Kutkaite Cup finishing 8th in the all-around.
