= Diving at the 2017 Summer Universiade – Mixed synchronized 3 metre springboard =

Mixed synchronized 3 metre springboard at the Universiade
- Venue: University of Taipei (Tianmu) Shin-hsin Hall B1 Diving Pool
- Dates: 22 August 2017
- Competitors: 22 from 11 nations

Medalists
1st place, gold medalist(s)		Adan Emidio Zuniga; Arantxa Chávez	Mexico
2nd place, silver medalist(s)		Stanislav Oliferchyk; Viktoriya Kesar	Ukraine
3rd place, bronze medalist(s)		Laura Bilotta; Gabriele Auber	Italy

The mixed synchronized 3 metre springboard diving event at the 2017 Summer Universiade was contested on August 22 at the University of Taipei (Tianmu) Shin-hsin Hall B1 Diving Pool in Taipei, Taiwan.

== Schedule ==
All times are Taiwan Standard Time (UTC+08:00)

Date	Time	Event
Tuesday, 22 August 2017	16:00	Final

== Results ==
=== Final ===
Rank	Athlete	Dive					Total
Rank	Athlete	1	2	3	4	5	Total
1st place, gold medalist(s)	Adan Emidio Zuniga (MEX); Arantxa Chávez (MEX)	46.80	46.80	71.61	68.40	68.40	302.01
2nd place, silver medalist(s)	Stanislav Oliferchyk (UKR); Viktoriya Kesar (UKR)	47.40	46.20	64.80	63.00	63.24	284.64
3rd place, bronze medalist(s)	Laura Bilotta (ITA); Gabriele Auber (ITA)	45.00	48.60	65.70	59.52	58.32	277.14
4	Grayson Michael Campbell (USA); Meghan Elizabeth O'Brien (USA)	48.00	44.40	68.40	51.30	62.10	274.20
5	Kazuki Murakami (JPN); Haruka Enomoto (JPN)	48.00	48.00	52.20	60.48	58.50	267.18
6	Maria Polyakova (RUS); Viktor Minibaev (RUS)	46.80	45.60	66.60	67.89	39.60	266.49
7	Jana Lisa Rother (GER); Frithjof Seidel (GER)	45.60	43.20	54.00	56.70	65.70	265.20
8	Kim Na-mi (KOR); Kim Yeong-nam (KOR)	48.00	44.40	55.08	59.64	56.70	263.82
9	Rim Kum-song (PRK); Choe Un-gyong (PRK)	48.00	46.80	54.90	41.16	64.80	255.66
10	Lai Yu-yen (TPE); Lin Yun-di (TPE)	31.80	36.60	35.91	36.00	37.20	177.51
