= Diving at the 2017 Summer Universiade – Women's synchronized 3 metre springboard =

Women's synchronized 3 metre springboard at the Universiade
- Venue: University of Taipei (Tianmu) Shin-hsin Hall B1 Diving Pool
- Dates: 24 August 2017
- Competitors: 18 from 9 nations

Medalists
1st place, gold medalist(s)		Arantxa Chávez; Melany Hernández	Mexico
2nd place, silver medalist(s)		Kim Na-mi; Kim Su-ji	South Korea
3rd place, bronze medalist(s)		Maria Polyakova; Elena Chernykh	Russia

The women's synchronized 3 metre springboard diving event at the 2017 Summer Universiade was contested on August 24 at the University of Taipei (Tianmu) Shin-hsin Hall B1 Diving Pool in Taipei, Taiwan.

== Schedule ==
All times are Taiwan Standard Time (UTC+08:00)

Date	Time	Event
Saturday, 24 August 2017	16:45	Final

== Results ==
=== Final ===
Rank	Athlete	Dive					Total
Rank	Athlete	1	2	3	4	5	Total
1st place, gold medalist(s)	Arantxa Chávez (MEX); Melany Hernández (MEX)	47.40	42.60	66.60	68.82	64.80	290.22
2nd place, silver medalist(s)	Kim Na-mi (KOR); Kim Su-ji (KOR)	45.60	45.00	62.37	61.32	66.60	280.89
3rd place, bronze medalist(s)	Maria Polyakova (RUS); Elena Chernykh (RUS)	42.60	45.00	59.40	60.30	63.00	270.30
4	Brooke Christin Schultz (USA); Alison Amaris Gibson (USA)	49.20	45.00	56.70	64.17	53.10	268.17
5	Kim Un-hyang (PRK); Choe Un-gyong (PRK)	48.00	41.40	63.00	55.44	58.32	266.16
6	Luana Wanderley Moreira (BRA); Tammy Takagi (BRA)	47.40	46.20	56.70	57.12	57.60	265.02
7	Anastasiia Nedobiga (UKR); Diana Shelestyuk (UKR)	45.60	43.20	62.10	58.50	45.00	254.40
8	Louisa Hannah Stawczynski (GER); Saskia Maureen Oettinghaus (GER)	46.20	43.20	53.10	57.60	53.76	253.86
9	Haruka Enomoto (JPN); Hana Kaneto (JPN)	43.80	46.80	52.20	36.90	53.10	232.80
