= Diving at the 2017 Summer Universiade – Mixed team =

Mixed team at the XXIX Summer Universiade
- Venue: University of Taipei (Tianmu) Shin-hsin Hall B1 Diving Pool
- Dates: 27 August 2017
- Competitors: 20 from 10 nations

Medalists
1st place, gold medalist(s)		Oleksandr Gorshkovozov; Anastasiia Nedobiga	Ukraine
2nd place, silver medalist(s)		Tyler Robert Henschel; Celina Jayne Toth	Canada
3rd place, bronze medalist(s)		Lars Ruediger; Kieu Trang Duong	Germany

The mixed team diving event at the 2017 Summer Universiade was contested on August 27 at the University of Taipei (Tianmu) Shin-hsin Hall B1 Diving Pool in Taipei, Taiwan.

== Schedule ==
All times are Taiwan Standard Time (UTC+08:00)

Date	Time	Event
Sunday, 27 August 2017	15:00	Final

== Results ==
=== Final ===
	10 metre platform
	3 metre springboard
°	Second diver

Rank	Athlete	Dive						Total
Rank	Athlete	1	2	3	4	5	6	Total
1st place, gold medalist(s)	Oleksandr Gorshkovozov (UKR); Anastasiia Nedobiga (UKR)	49.00	°42.00	86.40	°67.50	92.50	°61.50	398.90
2nd place, silver medalist(s)	Tyler Robert Henschel (CAN); Celina Jayne Toth (CAN)	°45.00	48.00	°66.00	64.60	°62.40	76.80	362.80
3rd place, bronze medalist(s)	Lars Ruediger (GER); Kieu Trang Duong (GER)	°41.00	64.75	°63.00	81.60	°58.80	44.00	353.15
4	Julio César Rodríguez (MEX); Arantxa Chávez (MEX)	51.00	°44.00	73.60	°49.50	67.20	°66.00	351.30
5	Haruki Suyama (JPN); Haruka Enomoto (JPN)	°46.00	41.00	°71.40	45.90	°65.25	78.75	348.30
6	Woo Ha-ram (KOR); Kim Su-ji (KOR)	°44.00	46.00	°61.60	83.30	°63.00	49.95	347.85
7	Aleksandr Bondar (RUS); Ekaterina Nekrasova (RUS)	°48.00	46.00	°58.50	61.25	°31.50	91.80	337.05
8	David Dinsmore (USA); Alison Amaris Gibson (USA)	°45.00	48.00	°29.45	75.60	°45.00	81.00	324.05
9	Hyon Il-myong (PRK); Kim Kuk-hyang (PRK)	46.00	°39.00	73.50	°76.80	0.00	°81.60	316.90
10	Lorenzo Marsaglia (ITA); Flavia Pallotta (ITA)	°36.00	71.40	°35.00	61.25	°55.35	23.00	288.80
