= Diving at the 2017 Summer Universiade – Women's 3 metre springboard =

Women's 3 metre springboard at the Universiade
- Venue: University of Taipei (Tianmu) Shin-hsin Hall B1 Diving Pool
- Dates: 25–26 August 2017
- Competitors: 33 from 16 nations

Medalists
1st place, gold medalist(s)		Arantxa Chávez	Mexico
2nd place, silver medalist(s)		Brooke Christin Schultz	United States
3rd place, bronze medalist(s)		Kim Su-ji	South Korea

The women's 3 metre springboard diving event at the 2017 Summer Universiade was contested from August 25 to 26 at the University of Taipei (Tianmu) Shin-hsin Hall B1 Diving Pool in Taipei, Taiwan.

== Schedule ==
All times are Taiwan Standard Time (UTC+08:00)

Date	Time	Event
Saturday, 25 August 2017	10:00	Preliminary
Saturday, 25 August 2017	13:00	Semifinals
Sunday, 26 August 2017	16:00	Final

== Results ==
Qualified for the next phase

=== Preliminary ===
Rank	Athlete	Dive					Total
Rank	Athlete	1	2	3	4	5	Total
1	Dolores Hernández (MEX)	63.00	63.55	60.00	58.50	58.50	303.55
2	Viktoriya Kesar (UKR)	60.00	63.00	58.50	54.00	60.45	295.95
3	Kim Na-mi (KOR)	52.65	60.20	58.80	54.60	58.50	284.75
4	Hana Kaneto (JPN)	52.80	51.00	52.65	58.50	60.00	274.95
5	Michal Rae Bower (USA)	56.70	51.00	55.50	54.60	56.00	273.80
6	Arantxa Chávez (MEX)	45.00	58.50	51.00	54.25	63.00	271.75
7	Anastasiia Nedobiga (UKR)	60.00	38.75	61.50	57.00	54.00	271.25
8	Brooke Christin Schultz (USA)	63.00	29.45	54.00	58.50	63.00	267.95
9	Daniella Sylvia Nero (SWE)	50.40	51.80	58.50	54.60	48.60	263.90
10	Olivia Louise Rosendahl (USA)	46.80	56.70	53.20	47.60	59.45	263.75
11	Elena Chernykh (RUS)	55.50	55.50	45.00	51.15	55.50	262.65
12	Olga Kulemina (RUS)	58.05	45.00	63.00	49.50	46.50	262.05
13	Yuka Mabuchi (JPN)	52.80	45.90	50.40	52.50	56.00	257.60
14	Kim Su-ji (KOR)	49.95	54.60	63.00	36.00	54.00	257.55
15	Luana Wanderley Moreira (BRA)	51.30	43.50	64.50	49.00	47.85	256.15
16	Ashley Ann Mccool (CAN)	45.90	46.20	57.40	46.20	60.00	255.70
17	Ruby Grace Neave (AUS)	55.50	46.50	54.00	44.80	48.60	249.40
18	Kim Un-hyang (PRK)	51.30	46.50	50.40	60.20	40.50	248.90
19	Haruka Enomoto (JPN)	50.40	46.50	58.50	51.00	40.50	246.90
20	Jana Lisa Rother (RUS)	40.50	50.40	43.50	54.00	54.00	246.90
21	Laura Bilotta (ITA)	54.00	21.70	51.80	58.50	55.35	241.35
22	Choe Un-gyong (PRK)	51.00	21.00	54.60	49.50	61.50	237.60
23	Louisa Hannah Stawczynski (GER)	54.00	31.50	52.50	49.00	40.60	227.60
24	Ekaterina Nekrasova (RUS)	49.50	35.65	52.50	33.00	51.00	221.65
25	Elaena Nancy Dick (CAN)	56.70	36.00	42.00	36.40	49.50	220.60
26	Natasha MacManus (IRL)	44.55	43.20	40.50	53.20	36.40	217.85
27	Indre Marija Girdauskaite (LTU)	46.80	45.90	37.80	44.80	39.00	214.30
28	Anca Şerb (ROU)	56.70	46.20	35.00	30.80	43.20	211.90
29	Tammy Takagi (BRA)	50.40	40.50	35.65	48.00	30.00	204.55
30	Saskia Maureen Oettinghaus (GER)	52.65	26.35	40.50	33.00	51.00	203.50
31	Diana Shelestyuk (UKR)	39.00	28.50	37.80	42.00	49.50	196.80
32	Lai Yu-yen (TPE)	34.65	42.00	34.20	36.30	33.00	180.15
33	Melany Hernández (MEX)						DNS

=== Semifinal ===
Rank	Athlete	Dive					Total
Rank	Athlete	1	2	3	4	5	Total
1	Viktoriya Kesar (MEX)	58.50	63.00	57.00	61.50	72.85	312.85
2	Brooke Christin Schultz (USA)	60.00	69.75	58.50	58.50	63.00	309.75
3	Kim Su-ji (KOR)	58.05	61.60	60.20	37.50	63.00	280.35
4	Arantxa Chávez (MEX)	55.50	58.50	54.00	48.05	63.00	279.05
5	Michal Rae Bower (USA)	54.00	61.50	40.50	54.60	61.60	272.20
6	Elena Chernykh (RUS)	54.00	54.00	40.50	60.45	63.00	271.95
7	Kim Na-mi (KOR)	51.30	51.80	54.60	50.40	63.00	271.10
8	Ashley Ann Mccool (CAN)	52.65	50.40	49.00	58.80	57.00	267.85
9	Yuka Mabuchi (JPN)	52.80	48.60	58.80	51.25	54.60	266.02
10	Daniella Sylvia Nero (SWE)	53.20	51.80	55.50	54.60	37.80	252.90
11	Luana Wanderley Moreira (BRA)	55.35	45.00	58.50	37.80	52.20	248.85
12	Anastasiia Nedobiga (UKR)	57.00	40.30	57.00	33.00	58.50	245.80
13	Olga Kulemina (RUS)	56.70	49.50	60.20	60.00	15.00	241.40
14	Hana Kaneto (JPN)	50.40	46.50	41.85	46.50	54.00	239.25
15	Jana Lisa Rother (GER)	49.50	46.20	31.50	45.00	55.50	227.70
16	Laura Bilotta (ITA)	51.00	44.95	37.80	37.50	52.65	223.90
17	Louisa Hannah Stawczynski (GER)	56.70	30.00	51.00	43.40	35.00	216.10
18	Ruby Grace Neave (AUS)	49.50	0.00	60.00	49.00	52.65	211.15

=== Final ===
Rank	Athlete	Dive					Total
Rank	Athlete	1	2	3	4	5	Total
1st place, gold medalist(s)	Arantxa Chávez (MEX)	58.50	63.00	63.00	72.85	70.50	327.85
2nd place, silver medalist(s)	Brooke Christin Schultz (USA)	66.00	63.55	72.00	64.50	57.00	323.05
3rd place, bronze medalist(s)	Kim Su-ji (KOR)	59.40	63.00	63.00	61.50	63.00	309.90
4	Viktoriya Kesar (UKR)	63.00	64.50	58.50	58.50	62.00	306.50
5	Ashley Ann Mccool (CAN)	58.05	54.60	50.40	63.00	63.00	289.05
6	Anastasiia Nedobiga (UKR)	51.00	68.20	43.50	63.00	63.00	288.70
7	Elena Chernykh (RUS)	55.50	64.50	63.00	41.85	63.00	287.85
8	Yuka Mabuchi (JPN)	50.40	54.00	58.80	52.50	58.80	274.50
9	Daniella Sylvia Nero (SWE)	50.40	54.60	60.00	50.40	52.65	268.05
10	Luana Wanderley Moreira (BRA)	48.60	45.00	43.50	33.60	55.10	255.80
11	Michal Rae Bower (USA)	52.65	42.00	48.00	33.60	46.20	222.45
12	Kim Na-mi (KOR)	48.60	44.80	54.60	0.00	63.00	211.00
