= Mexico at the 2017 Summer Universiade =

- IOC code: MEX
- NOC: Mexican Olympic Committee
- Website: www.com.org.mx

in Taipei, Taiwan 19 August 2017 – 30 August 2017
- Competitors: 211 in 18 sports
- Flag bearer: Itzel Manjarrez
- Medals Ranked 13th: Gold 6 Silver 5 Bronze 11 Total 22

Summer Universiade appearances
- 1959; 1961; 1963; 1965; 1967; 1970; 1973; 1975; 1977; 1979; 1981; 1983; 1985; 1987; 1989; 1991; 1993; 1995; 1997; 1999; 2001; 2003; 2005; 2007; 2009; 2011; 2013; 2015; 2017; 2019; 2021; 2025; 2027

Mexico will participate at the 2017 Summer Universiade in Taipei, Taiwan.

== Medalists ==
Medal	Name	Sport	Event	Date
Gold	Dolores Hernández	Diving	Women's 1 m	20 August
Gold	Adán Zúñiga; Arantxa Chávez	Diving	Mixed 3 m	22 August
Gold	Arantxa Chávez; Melany Hernández	Diving	Women's synchronized 3 m	24 August
Gold	Arantxa Chávez	Diving	Women's 3 m	26 August
Gold	Raúl Pereda	Golf	Men's individual	27 August
Gold	Jesús Tonatiú López	Athletics	Men's 800 m	28 August
Silver	Antonio Vázquez	Weightlifting	Men's 62 kg	20 August
Silver	Julio César Salazar	Athletics	Men's 20 km walk	26 August
Silver	Ever Palma; Isaac Pâlma; Julio César Salazar	Athletics	20 km walk team	26 August
Silver	Luis Gerardo Garza; Álvaro Ortiz; Raúl Pereda	Golf	Men's team	27 August
Silver	Dania Aguillón; Natali Brito; Rosa Cook; Iza Flores; Paola Morán	Athletics	Women's 4 × 400 m relay	28 August
Bronze	César Rodríguez	Taekwondo	Men's -54 kg	22 August
Bronze	Paulina Armería	Taekwondo	Women's -57 kg	22 August
Bronze	Itzel Manjarrez	Taekwondo	Women's -49 kg	23 August
Bronze	Victoria Heredia	Taekwondo	Women's -67 kg	23 August
Bronze	Alejandra Valencia	Archery	Women's individual recurve	24 August
Bronze	Jorge Nevarez; Alejandra Valencia	Archery	Mixed team recurve	24 August
Bronze	Melissa Oviedo	Taekwondo	Women's -62 kg	24 August
Bronze	Briseida Acosta	Taekwondo	Women's +73 kg	24 August
Bronze	Paulina Armería; Victoria Heredia; Melissa Oviedo; Renata García	Taekwondo	Women's team Kyorugi	26 August
Bronze	Adán Zúñiga; Jahir Ocampo; Rodrigo Diego; Julio Rodríguez; Diego García; José Balleza	Diving	Men's team	27 August
Bronze	Mexico	Football	Men's tournament	29 August

Medals by sport
Sport	1st place, gold medalist(s)	2nd place, silver medalist(s)	3rd place, bronze medalist(s)	Total
Diving	4	0	1	5
Athletics	1	3	0	4
Golf	1	1	0	2
Weightlifting	0	1	0	1
Taekwondo	0	0	7	7
Archery	0	0	2	2
Football	0	0	1	1
Total	6	5	11	22

== Competitors ==
Sport	Men	Women	Total
Archery	6	6	12
Athletics	18	10	28
Baseball	22	0	22
Basketball	12	0	12
Diving	6	4	10
Fencing	0	4	4
Football	20	20	40
Golf	3	3	6
Gymnastics	2	2	4
Judo	0	3	3
Roller sports	1	1	2
Swimming	7	2	9
Table tennis	1	0	1
Taekwondo	9	8	17
Tennis	4	4	8
Volleyball	12	12	24
Weightlifting	3	6	9
Total	126	85	211

== Archery ==
=== Recurve ===
Athlete	Event	Ranking Round		Round of 48	Round of 24	Round of 16	Round of 8	Quarterfinals	Semifinals	Final / BM	Rank
Athlete	Event	Score	Seed	Opposition Score	Opposition Score	Opposition Score	Opposition Score	Opposition Score	Opposition Score	Opposition Score	Rank
Luis Álvarez	Men's individual	651	24	Bye	Morgan (GBR); W 6-5	Wolfe (USA); W 6-2	Jimenez (FRA); L 3-7	did not advance			
Jorge Nevarez	Men's individual	653	20	Bye	Oona (EST); L 5-6	did not advance					
Oldair Zamora	Men's individual	641	32	Bye	Chirault (FRA); W 6-5	Lee (KOR); L 0-6	did not advance				
Luis Álvarez; Jorge Nevarez; Oldair Zamora	Men's team	1945	6	—N/a			Great Britain (GBR); W 6-2	Russia (RUS); L 2-6	did not advance		
Alejandra Valencia	Women's individual	649	7	Bye		Mercuri (ITA); W 6-2	Singh (IND); W 6-2	Lee (KOR); W 6-5	Kang (KOR); L 3-7	Lei (TPE); W 6-0	3rd place, bronze medalist(s)
Yoko Guerrero	Women's individual	604	37	Bye	Khochyna (UKR); L 5-6	did not advance					
Rebeca Márquez	Women's individual	612	30	Bye	van Dijck (NED); W 6-0	Kang (KOR); L 0-6	did not advance				
Alejandra Valencia; Yoko Guerrero; Rebeca Márquez	Women's team	1865	6	—N/a			Malaysia (MAS); W 6-2	Russia (RUS); L 0-6	did not advance		
Jorge Nevarez; Alejandra Valencia	Mixed team	1384	2	—N/a			India (IND); W 5-3	Poland (POL); W 5-1	South Korea (KOR); L 0-6	Japan (JPN); W 5-4	3rd place, bronze medalist(s)

=== Compound ===
Athlete	Event	Ranking Round		Round of 24	Round of 16	Round of 8	Quarterfinals	Semifinals	Final / BM	Rank
Athlete	Event	Score	Seed	Opposition Score	Opposition Score	Opposition Score	Opposition Score	Opposition Score	Opposition Score	Rank
Rodolfo González	Men's individual	696	3	Bye	Kalashnikov (RUS); L 141-147	did not advance				
Antonio Hidalgo	Men's individual	686	21	Brooks (GBR); W 139-135	Bee (USA); W 145-137	Cagiran (TUR); L 144-145	did not advance			
Adolfo Medina	Men's individual	684	24	Ruggiero (ITA); W 143-141	Singh (IND); L 141-145	did not advance				
Rodolfo González; Antonio Hidalgo; Adolfo Medina	Men's team	2066	3	—N/a		Singapore (SGP); W 211-198	Chinese Taipei (TPE); W 229-214	Russia (RUS); L 214-222	South Korea (KOR); L 223-235	4
Abril López	Women's individual	670	23	Grydeland (NOR); W 141-138	Mat (MAS); L 144-145	did not advance				
Brenda Merino	Women's individual	680	13	Pittarelli (ITA); W 143-125	Strachan (USA); W 142-132	Song (KOR); L 142-143	did not advance			
Fernanda Zepeda	Women's individual	688	3	Bye	Dudareva (KAZ); W 139-132	Chen (TPE); L 143-143	did not advance			
Abril López; Brenda Merino; Fernanda Zepeda	Women's team	2038	3	—N/a		Bye	Russia (RUS); L 206-210	did not advance		
Rodolfo González; Fernanda Zepeda	Mixed team	1384	2	—N/a		Singapore (SGP); W 149-140	India (IND); L 147-152	did not advance		

== Athletics ==
Key

- Note– Ranks given for track events are within the athlete's heat only
- Q = Qualified for the next round
- q = Qualified for the next round as a fastest loser or, in field events, by position without achieving the qualifying target
- DNF = Did not finish
- NM = No mark
- DSQ = Disqualified
- N/A = Round not applicable for the event

Men
Track & road events

Athlete	Event	Round 1 Heat		Round 2 Heat		Semifinal		Final	
Athlete	Event	Result	Rank	Result	Rank	Result	Rank	Result	Rank
Jose Carlos Alanís	100 m	10.47	2 Q	10.77	8	Did not advance			
Heber Gallegos	100 m	10.41	2 Q	10.37	2 Q	10.44	6	did not advance	
Iván Moreno	200 m	21.70	3	—N/a		did not advance			
Arturo Sepúlveda	200 m	21.93	5	—N/a		did not advance			
Jesús Tonatiú López	800 m	1:51.07	1 Q	—N/a		1:48.23	1 Q	1:46.06	1st place, gold medalist(s)
Fernando Martínez	1500 m	3:46.88	2 Q	—N/a				3:47.18	9
José Juan Esparza	5000 m	15:10.22	12	—N/a				did not advance	
Fernando Martínez	5000 m	14:52.65	9	—N/a				did not advance	
Jesús Esparza	Half marathon	—N/a						1:12.27	23
Saby Luna	Half marathon	—N/a						DNF	
Ever Palma	20 km walk	—N/a						1:30.23	4
Isaac Palma	20 km walk	—N/a						1:30.31	5
Julio César Salazar	20 km walk	—N/a						1:28.20	2nd place, silver medalist(s)
Ever Palma; Isaac Palma; Julio César Salazar	Team 20 km walk	—N/a						4:29.14	2nd place, silver medalist(s)
Juan Carlos Alanís; Heber Gallegos; Iván Moreno; César Ramírez; Arturo Sepúlveda	4 × 100 m relay	39.31	2 q	—N/a				39.17	4

Field events

Athlete	Event	Qualification		Final	
Athlete	Event	Distance	Position	Distance	Position
Jorge Luna	Pole vault	5.30	Q	5.20	7
Alberto Álvarez	Long jump	7.31	26	did not advance	
Alberto Álvarez	Triple jump	16.47	2 q	16.71	4
Mario Cota	Discus throw	58.25	5 q	60.07	4
Diego del Real	Hammer throw	70.50	3 Q	NM	

Combined events

Athlete	Event		100 m	LJ	SP	HJ	400 m	110H	DT	PV	JT	1500 m	Final	Rank
Felipe de Jesús Ruiz	Decathlon	Result	11.41	6.24	12.20	NM	51.93	DNF					DNF	
Felipe de Jesús Ruiz	Decathlon	Points	771	639	619	0	728	DNF					DNF	

Women
Track & road events

Athlete	Event	Round 1 Heat		Round 2 Heat		Semifinal		Final	
Athlete	Event	Result	Rank	Result	Rank	Result	Rank	Result	Rank
Iza Flores	100 m	11.93	3 Q	11.99	7	did not advance			
Dania Aguillón	200 m	24.80	Q	—N/a		24.33	4	did not advance	
Iza Flores	200 m	DSQ		—N/a		did not advance			
Natali Brito	400 m	53.58	3 Q	—N/a		DSQ			
Paola Morán	400 m	52.43	1 Q	—N/a		52.38	3 q	52.96	7
Brenda Flores	10,000 m	—N/a						DNF	
Dania Aguillón; Natali Brito; Rosa Cook; Iza Flores; Paola Morán	4 × 100 m relay	44.87	2 Q	—N/a				44.79	4
Dania Aguillón; Natali Brito; Rosa Cook; Iza Flores; Paola Morán	4 × 400 m relay	3:38.16	1 Q	—N/a				3:33.98	2nd place, silver medalist(s)

Field events

Athlete	Event	Qualification		Final	
Athlete	Event	Distance	Position	Distance	Position
Ximena Esquivel	High jump	1.75	3 q	1.88	4
Gloria Maldonado	High jump	1.75	3 q	1.80	11
Susana Hernández	Long jump	5.84	15	did not advance	
Gloria Maldovnado	Long jump	5.87	14	did not advance	
María Fernanda Orozco	Shot put	15.69	9 q	16.44	9

== Baseball ==
Group stage

Team	Pld	W	L	RF	RA	Pct
Japan	3	3	0	37	7	1.00
United States	3	2	1	21	16	0.67
Mexico	3	1	2	19	10	0.33
Russia	3	0	3	3	47	0.00

August 20, 2017; 18:30 (UTC+8)	Mexico	2–3	United States	Tianmu Baseball Stadium, Taipei City; Attendance: 800
August 20, 2017; 18:30 (UTC+8)		Boxscore		Tianmu Baseball Stadium, Taipei City; Attendance: 800

August 22, 2017; 11:00 (UTC+8)	Japan	7–2	Mexico	Xinzhuan Baseball Stadium, New Taipei City; Attendance: 1,002
August 22, 2017; 11:00 (UTC+8)		Boxscore		Xinzhuan Baseball Stadium, New Taipei City; Attendance: 1,002

August 23, 2017; 18:30 (UTC+8)	Mexico	15–0	Russia	Xinzhuang Baseball Stadium, New Taipei City; Attendance: 352
August 23, 2017; 18:30 (UTC+8)		Boxscore		Xinzhuang Baseball Stadium, New Taipei City; Attendance: 352

Consolation round

Team	Pld	W	L	RF	RA	Pct
France	3	2	1	20	18	0.67
Chinese Taipei	3	2	1	29	5	0.67
Mexico	3	2	1	24	16	0.67
Russia	3	0	3	7	41	0.00

August 25, 2017; 11:00 (UTC+8)	Mexico	1 - 11 (8 inn.)	Chinese Taipei	Xinzhuang Baseball Stadium, New Taipei City

August 26, 2017; 18:30 (UTC+8)	France	5–8	Mexico	Xinzhuang Baseball Stadium, New Taipei City; Attendance: 1,560
August 26, 2017; 18:30 (UTC+8)		Boxscore		Xinzhuang Baseball Stadium, New Taipei City; Attendance: 1,560

5th-8th place

August 27, 2017; 11:00 (UTC+8)	Chinese Taipei	10–0	Mexico	Xinzhuang Baseball Stadium, New Taipei City; Attendance: 5,458
August 27, 2017; 11:00 (UTC+8)		Boxscore		Xinzhuang Baseball Stadium, New Taipei City; Attendance: 5,458

7th place

August 27, 2017; 11:00 (UTC+8)	Mexico	5–11	France	Xinzhuang Baseball Stadium, New Taipei City; Attendance: 805
August 27, 2017; 11:00 (UTC+8)		Boxscore		Xinzhuang Baseball Stadium, New Taipei City; Attendance: 805

Final rank

- 8th

== Basketball ==
=== Men's tournament ===
Preliminary round

Team	Pld	W	L	PF	PA	PD	Pts
Serbia	5	4	1	416	366	+50	9
Latvia	5	3	2	415	357	+58	8
Mexico	5	3	2	438	425	+13	8
Chinese Taipei	5	3	2	365	382	−17	8
Hungary	5	1	4	356	386	−30	6
South Korea	5	1	4	379	453	−74	6

20 August 2017
12:30 (UTC+8)

Boxscore

South Korea	97–94	Mexico
Scoring by quarter: 27–16, 20–37, 27–15, 23–26

Taipei Heping Basketball Gymnasium

21 August 2017
12:30 (UTC+8)

Boxscore

Mexico	85–78	Latvia
Scoring by quarter: 20–22, 21–19, 20–17, 24–20

Taipei Arena

22 August 2017
17:30 (UTC+8)

Boxscore

Mexico	88–90	Chinese Taipei
Scoring by quarter: 26–25, 24–23, 12–24, 26–18

Taipei Heping Basketball Gymnasium

24 August 2017
15:00 (UTC+8)

Report

Serbia	83–89	Mexico
Scoring by quarter: 24–14, 17–26, 28–17, 14–32

Taipei Heping Basketball Gymnasium

25 August 2017
15:00 (UTC+8)

Report

Mexico	82–77	Hungary
Scoring by quarter: 24–25, 20–19, 20–16, 18–17

Hsinchu Municipal Gymnasium
Referees: Zalazar Leonardo (Argentina)

9th–16th place

27 August 2017
17:30 (UTC+8)

Mexico	81–75	Norway
Scoring by quarter: 20–22, 23–22, 18–17, 20–14

Hsinchu Municipal Gymnasium

9th–12th place

28 August 2017
15:00 (UTC+8)

Mexico	71–93	Australia
Scoring by quarter: 19–29, 18–22, 18–22, 16–20

Taipei Heping Basketball Gymnasium

11th place game

29 August 2017
17:00 (UTC+8)

Czech Republic	69–93	Mexico
Scoring by quarter: 11–19, 15–24, 18–25, 25–25

Hsinchu Municipal Gymnasium

Final rank

- 11th

== Diving ==
Men

Athlete	Event	Preliminaries		Semifinals		Final	
Athlete	Event	Points	Rank	Points	Rank	Points	Rank
Adán Zúñiga	1 m springboard	337.05	16	did not advance			
Jahir Ocampo	1 m springboard	369.45	7 Q	419.70	1 Q	410.50	5
Rodrigo Diego	1 m springboard	350.00	12 Q	393.60	3 Q	385.00	8
Adán Zúñiga	3 m springboard	366.25	15 Q	348.50	16	did not advance	
Jahir Ocampo	3 m springboard	451.20	2 Q	405.45	9 Q	421.35	10
Julio Rodríguez	3 m springboard	365.90	16	did not advance			
Diego García	10 m platform	350.65	15 Q	345.20	15	did not advance	
José Balleza	10 m platform	414.60	6 Q	421.60	7 Q	447.95	6
Rodrigo Diego López; Adán Zúñiga	3 m synchronized springboard	—N/a				383.37	6
José Balleza; Jahir Ocampo	10 m synchronized platform	—N/a				376.44	5
Adán Zúñiga; Jahir Ocampo; Rodrigo Diego; Julio Rodríguez; Diego García; José Balleza	Team	—N/a				3513.51	3rd place, bronze medalist(s)

Women

Athlete	Event	Preliminaries		Semifinals		Final	
Athlete	Event	Points	Rank	Points	Rank	Points	Rank
Arantxa Chávez	1 m springboard	254.45	3 Q	264.85	1 Q	265.70	5
Dolores Hernández	1 m springboard	254.40	4 Q	248.50	5 Q	278.70	1st place, gold medalist(s)
Melany Hernández	1 m springboard	203.05	26	did not advance			
Arantxa Chávez	3 m springboard	271.75	6 Q	279.05	4 Q	327.85	1st place, gold medalist(s)
Dolores Hernández	3 m springboard	303.55	1 Q	DNS		did not advance	
Daniela Zambrano	10 m platform	265.30	9 Q	251.80	12 Q	231.90	12
Arantxa Chávez; Melany Hernández	3 m synchronized springboard	—N/a				290.22	1st place, gold medalist(s)
Arantxa Chávez; Dolores Hernández; Melany Hernández; Daniela Zambrano	Team	—N/a				2091.22	4

Mixed

Athlete	Event	Final	
Athlete	Event	Points	Rank
Arantxa Chávez; Adán Zúñiga	3 m synchronized springboard	302.01	1st place, gold medalist(s)
Daniela Zambrano; Diego García	10 m synchronized platform	249.78	6
Dolores Hernández; José Balleza	Team event	351.30	4

== Fencing ==
Women

Athlete	Event	Pool Round		Round of 64	Round of 32	Round of 16	Quarterfinals	Semifinals	Final / BM	
Athlete	Event	Result	Seed	Opposition Score	Opposition Score	Opposition Score	Opposition Score	Opposition Score	Opposition Score	Rank
Alely Hernández	Foil	4V – 1D	1 Q	Bye	Kreiss (HUN); L 10-15	did not advance				
Victoria Meza	Foil	1V – 5D	6	did not advance						
Melissa Rebolledo	Foil	3V – 2D	4 Q	Cellerova (SVK); L 14-15	did not advance					
Alely Hernández; Victoria Meza; Melissa Rebolledo	Foil Team	—N/a				Romania (ROU); W 45-42	Hungary (HUN); L 36-42	did not advance		
Kin Escamilla	Sabre	1V – 5D	6	did not advance						

== Football ==
=== Men's tournament ===
Preliminary round

Pos	Team	Pld	W	D	L	GF	GA	GD	Pts	Qualification
1	Mexico	3	2	1	0	5	1	+4	7	Elimination round
2	France	3	1	2	0	2	1	+1	5	Elimination round
3	Republic of Ireland	3	1	1	1	2	2	0	4	Classification round
4	Chinese Taipei (H)	3	0	0	3	1	6	−5	0	Classification round

(H) Hosts
18 August 2017
19:30
(UTC+08:00)

Chinese Taipei	0–3	Mexico
	Report	Treviño 9'; Garduño 48'; Quiñones 80'

Fu Jen Catholic University Stadium, New Taipei City
Referee: Ammar Ebrahim Hasan Mahfoodh (Bahrain)

21 August 2017
19:30
(UTC+08:00)

Republic of Ireland	0–1	Mexico
	Report	Hernández 7'

New Taipei City Xinzhuang Stadium, New Taipei City
Referee: Timur Faizullin (Kyrgyzstan)

23 August 2017
19:30

France	1–1	Mexico
Minselebe 82'	Report	Garza Cabello 28'

New Taipei City Xinzhuang Stadium, New Taipei City
Referee: Takuto Okabe (Japan)

Quarterfinals

25 August 2017
19:30

Mexico	2–0	Ukraine
Hütt 3'; León 88'	Report

Fu Jen Catholic University Stadium, New Taipei City
Referee: Pranjal Banerjee (India)

Semifinals

27 August 2017
19:30

Mexico	1–3	Japan
Cruz Armenta 58'	Report	Mitoma 45+1' (pen.); Nakano 50'; Wakisaka 76'

Hsinchu County Second Stadium, Hsinchu County
Referee: Shukri Hussain Al-Hunfush (Saudi Arabia)

Bronze medal match

29 August 2017
16:00

Mexico	0–0	Uruguay
	Report
Penalties
Hütt (penalty scored); Fernández (penalty scored); Méndez (penalty scored); Quiñones (penalty scored); Treviño (penalty scored)	5–3	Oyenard (penalty scored); Christophersen (penalty scored); Tais Delucchi (penalty scored); Garella (penalty missed)

Fu Jen Catholic University Stadium, New Taipei City
Referee: Sherzod Kasimov (Uzbekistan)

Final rank

=== Women's tournament ===
Preliminary round

Team	Pld	W	D	L	GF	GA	GD	Pts
Mexico	2	1	1	0	2	0	+2	4
Canada	2	1	0	1	1	2	−1	3
Republic of Ireland	2	0	1	1	0	1	−1	1

18 August 2017
16:00

Mexico	0–0	Republic of Ireland
	Report

Hsinchu County Second Stadium, Hsinchu County
Referee: Oh Hyeon-jeong (South Korea)

22 August 2017
16:00

Canada	0–2	Mexico
	Report	Muñoz Soto 15'; Solís 33'

Fu Jen Catholic University Stadium, New Taipei City
Referee: Hung Yi Yu (Chinese Taipei)

Quarterfinals

24 August 2017
19:30

Mexico	2–3	Japan
Robles Partida 62'; Casas Escudero 85'	Report	Umezu 31'; Nakamura 76'; Kawano 78'

Chang Gung University Stadium, Taoyuan City
Referee: Anna Sidorova (Uzbekistan)

5th–8th place semifinals

26 August 2017
19:30

United States	5–2	Mexico
Irwin 9'; Bruder 30', 35'; Ayers 37'; Battan 40'	Report	Solis 45+1'; Piña 69'

New Taipei City Xinzhuang Stadium, New Taipei City
Referee: Oh Hyeon-jeong (South Korea)

7th place match

28 August 2017
19:30

Mexico	1–0	Canada
Evangelista 19'	Report

New Taipei City Xinzhuang Stadium, New Taipei City
Referee: Anna Sidorova (Uzbekistan)

Final rank

- 7th

== Golf ==
Athlete	Event	Round 1	Round 2	Round 3	Total		
Athlete	Event	Score	Score	Score	Score	Par	Rank
Luis Gerardo Garza	Men's individual	79	70	69	218	+2	21
Álvaro Ortiz	Men's individual	73	67	71	211	−5	9
Raúl Pereda	Men's individual	64	69	67	200	−16	1st place, gold medalist(s)
Luis Gerardo Garza; Álvaro Ortiz; Raúl Pereda	Men's team	137	136	136	409	—N/a	2nd place, silver medalist(s)
María Balcázar	Women's individual	76	76	70	222	+6	15
María José Fassi	Women's individual	73	71	74	218	+2	8
Ana Paula Valdés	Women's individual	79	73	74	226	+10	22
María Balcázar; María José Fassi; Ana Paula Valdés	Women's team	149	144	144	437	—N/a	6

== Gymnastics ==
=== Artistic ===
Athlete	Event	Qualification								Final							
Athlete	Event	Apparatus						Total	Rank	Apparatus						Total	Rank
Athlete	Event	F	PH	R	V	PB	HB	Total	Rank	F	PH	R	V	PB	HB	Total	Rank
Fabián de Luna	Pommel horse	—N/a	11.900	—N/a				11.900	58	did not advance							
Fabián de Luna	Rings	—N/a		14.550	—N/a			14.550	10 R	—N/a		14.366	—N/a			14.366	7
Fabián de Luna	Vault	—N/a			14.075	—N/a		14.075	10	did not advance							
Fabián de Luna	Parallel bars	—N/a				12.600	—N/a	12.600	62	did not advance							
Fabián de Luna	Horizontal bar	—N/a					12.725	12.725	52	did not advance							
Francisco Rojo	All-around	13.000	11.050	11.650	14.000	12.700	12.250	74.650	36	did not advance							

=== Rhythmic ===
Athlete	Event	Qualification				Final	
Athlete	Event	Hoop	Ball	Clubs	Ribbon	Total	Rank
Rut Castillo	Individual all-around	15.350 Q	14.600	15.050 Q	12.850	57.850	9
Cindy Gallegos	Individual all-around	13.750	11.700	12.100	12.400	49.950	22

Individual finals

Athlete	Event	Total	Rank
Rut Castillo	Hoop	15.100	6
Rut Castillo	Clubs	14.150	7

== Judo ==
Athlete	Event	Round of 16	Round of 8	Quarterfinals	Semifinals	Repechage 16	Repechage 8	Repechage Final	Final / BM	
Athlete	Event	Opposition Result	Opposition Result	Opposition Result	Opposition Result	Opposition Result	Opposition Result	Opposition Result	Opposition Result	Rank
Nayeli León	Women's −57 kg	Golomidova (RUS); L 00S1-01S1	did not advance							
Andrea Poo	Women's −70 kg	Tang (MAC); W 10-00	Fehr (USA); W 11-00S1	Babic (CRO); W 10S2-00S1	Niizoe (JPN); L 00-11	Bye			Paissoni (ITA); L 00S1-01S1	5
Melanie Bolaños	Women's +78 kg	Inoue (JPN); L 00S1–10	did not advance							
Melanie Bolaños; Nayeli León; Andrea Poo	Women's team	—N/a	Russia (RUS); L 0-5	did not advance		—N/a			did not advance	

== Roller Sports ==
Athlete	Event	Semifinal		Final Time/Points	Rank
Athlete	Event	Time/Points	Rank	Final Time/Points	Rank
Claudio García	Men's 1,000 m sprint	1:28.368	17	Did not advance	
Claudio García	Men's 10,000 m elimination	—N/a		EL	14
Claudio García	Men's 15,000 m elimination	—N/a		EL	5
Claudio García	Men's marathon	—N/a		1:07:23.385	12
Berenice Molina	Women's 1,000 m sprint	1:35.074	16	Did not advance	
Berenice Molina	Women's 10,000 m elimination	—N/a		EL	8
Berenice Molina	Women's 15,000 m elimination	—N/a		EL	6
Berenice Molina	Women's marathon	—N/a		1:27:50.462	20

EL = Eliminated

== Swimming ==
Men

Athlete	Event	Heat		Semifinal		Final	
Athlete	Event	Time	Rank	Time	Rank	Time	Rank
Long Yuan Gutiérrez	100 m freestyle	49.74	11 Q	50.01	16	Did not advance	
Long Yuan Gutiérrez	200 m freestyle	1:49.52	6 Q	1:49.05	11	Did not advance	
Long Yuan Gutiérrez	400 m freestyle	3:56.44	20	—N/a		Did not advance	
Long Yuan Gutiérrez	50 m butterfly	24.29	13	Did not advance			
Long Yuan Gutiérrez	100 m butterfly	53.52	20	Did not advance			
Andy Song	50 m backstroke	26.58	36	Did not advance			
Andy Song	100 m backstroke	56.91	34	Did not advance			
Andy Song	200 m backstroke	2:03.08	19	Did not advance			
Mauro Castillo	50 m breastroke	28.67	26	Did not advance			
Mauro Castillo	100 m breastroke	1:02.35	24	Did not advance			
Mauro Castillo	200 m breastroke	2:14.14	14 Q	2:14.87	15	Did not advance	
Jorge Iga	50 m freestyle	23.20	32	Did not advance			
Jorge Iga	100 m freestyle	50.30	20	Did not advance			
Jorge Iga	200 m freestyle	1:49.91	10 Q	1:50.26	16	Did not advance	
Jorge Iga	50 m butterfly	24.58	22	Did not advance			
Mateo González	100 m butterfly	53.52	20	Did not advance			
Mateo González	200 m individual medley	2:06.25	30	Did not advance			
Héctor Ruvalcaba	200 m butterfly	2:03.09	25	Did not advance			
Héctor Ruvalcaba	200 m individual medley	2:05.53	28	Did not advance			
Héctor Ruvalcaba	400 m individual medley	4:29.02	18	—N/a		Did not advance	
Ramiro Ramírez	200 m butterfly	2:00.56	18	Did not advance			
Mateo González; Long Yuan Gutiérrez; Andres Iga; Andy Song	4 × 100 m freestyle relay	3:22.31	12	—N/a		Did not advance	
Mateo González; Long Yuan Gutiérrez; Andres Iga; Andy Song	4 × 200 m freestyle relay	7:39.33	15	—N/a		Did not advance	
Mauro Castillo; Long Yuan Gutiérrez; Andres Iga; Andy Song	4 × 100 m medley relay	3:41.43	14	—N/a		Did not advance	

Women

Athlete	Event	Heat		Semifinal		Final	
Athlete	Event	Time	Rank	Time	Rank	Time	Rank
Ana Carrillo	50 m breastroke	33.09	21	Did not advance			
Ana Carrillo	100 m breastroke	1:14.20	32	Did not advance			
Ana Carrillo	200 m breastroke	2:38.77	26	Did not advance			
Byanca Rodríguez	50 m breastroke	32.21	11 Q	32.45	14	Did not advance	
Byanca Rodríguez	100 m breastroke	1:09.42	10 Q	1:10.00	14	Did not advance	
Byanca Rodríguez	200 m breastroke	2:29.42	6 Q	2:29.64	10	Did not advance	
Byanca Rodríguez	200 m individual medley	2:19.92	19	Did not advance			

== Table tennis ==
Athlete	Event	Group Stage			Round of 32	Round of 16	Quarterfinals	Semifinals	Final / BM	
Athlete	Event	Opposition Result	Opposition Result	Rank	Opposition Result	Opposition Result	Opposition Result	Opposition Result	Opposition Result	Rank
Miguel Ángel Lara	Men's singles	Bankosz (POL); L 2-3	Wang (NZL); W 3-0	2	did not advance					

== Taekwondo ==
Men

Athlete	Event	Round of 32	Round of 16	Quarterfinals	Semifinals	Final	
Athlete	Event	Opposition Result	Opposition Result	Opposition Result	Opposition Result	Opposition Result	Rank
César Rodríguez	Men's -54 kg	Bye	Navarro (ARG); W 25-9	Abdikaliyev (KAZ); W 31-17	Heo (KOR); L 9-18	Did not advance	3rd place, bronze medalist(s)
Salvador Álvarez	Men's -58 kg	Bye	Bette (FRA); L 7-8	did not advance			
Edgar Porras	Men's -63 kg	Mammadov (AZE); L 5-21	did not advance				
José Nava	Men's -68 kg	Azemi (SWE); W 24-14	Pérez (ESP); L 7-13	did not advance			
Héctor Álvarez	Men's -74 kg	Kakouris (CYP); W 9-8	Guliyev (AZE); L 5-5	did not advance			
René Lizárraga	Men's -80 kg	Bye	Bouzid (FRA); L 13-23	did not advance			
Misael López	Men's -87 kg	Bye	Uguz (TUR); W 16-11	Rajabi (IRI); L 3-17	did not advance		
Carlos Sansores	Men's +87 kg	Bye	Cho (KOR); L 7-8	did not advance			
Edgar Porras; José Nava; René Lizárraga; Misael López	Team Kyorugi	Bye	Russia (RUS); L 21-39	did not advance			

Women

Athlete	Event	Round of 32	Round of 16	Quarterfinals	Semifinals	Final	
Athlete	Event	Opposition Result	Opposition Result	Opposition Result	Opposition Result	Opposition Result	Rank
Diana Gómez	Women's -46 kg	Bye	Sabyr (KAZ); W 7-2	Romoldanova (UKR); L 2-2	did not advance		
Itzel Manjarrez	Women's -49 kg	Bye	Ilchyk (UKR); W 9-6	Yamada (JPN); W 11-8	Cidem (TUR); L 3-6	Did not advance	3rd place, bronze medalist(s)
Renata García	Women's -53 kg	Pilavaki (CYP); W 19-7	García (ESP); W 10-6	Bogdanovic (SRB); L 4-25	did not advance		
Paulina Armería	Women's -57 kg	Eris (AZE); W 0-DSQ	Ardiana (USA); W 8-4	Vieira (BRA); W 13-5	Lee (KOR); L 7-15	Did not advance	3rd place, bronze medalist(s)
Melissa Oviedo	Women's -62 kg	Bye	Froemming (GER); W 6-3	Gomes (BRA); W28-24	Yaman (TUR); L 1-5	Did not advance	3rd place, bronze medalist(s)
Victoria Heredia	Women's -67 kg	Bye	Yergeshova (KAZ); W 8-3	Jovic (SRB); W 14-12	Kim (KOR); L 7-17	Did not advance	3rd place, bronze medalist(s)
Mitzy Toledo	Women's -73 kg	Bye	Sakulkittiyut (THA); W 14-2	Deniz (KAZ); L 5-8	did not advance		
Briseida Acosta	Women's +73 kg	Bye	Avoulete (FRA); W 11-9	Ma (TPE); W 9-9	An (KOR); L 6-10	Did not advance	3rd place, bronze medalist(s)
Paulina Armería; Victoria Heredia; Melissa Oviedo; Renata García	Team Kyorugi	Bye	Germany (GER); W 23-12	United States (USA); W 13-11	Poland (POL); L 8-10	Did not advance	3rd place, bronze medalist(s)

Poomsae

Athlete	Event	Preliminaries		Semifinals		Final	
Athlete	Event	Points	Rank	Points	Rank	Points	Rank
Vaslav Ayala	Men's individual	79.9	3 Q	78.3	8 Q	69.2	5

== Tennis ==
Athlete	Event	Preliminary	Round of 64	Round of 32	Round of 16	Quarterfinals	Semifinals	Final / BM	
Athlete	Event	Opposition Result	Opposition Result	Opposition Result	Opposition Result	Opposition Result	Opposition Result	Opposition Result	Rank
Alonso Delgado	Men's singles	J Amazona (PHI); W 6-2, 6-1	J Jung (TPE); L 2-6, 2-6	Did not advance					
Rogelio Siller	Men's singles	Bye	S-c Hong (KOR); L 1-6, 2-6	Did not advance					
Jorge González; Luis Pineda	Men's doubles	—N/a		R Cocouvi / J Eon (GBR); L1-2	Did not advance				
Jessica Hinojosa Gómez	Women's singles	Bye	K Kerimbayeva (KAZ); L 6-4, 5-7, 2-6	Did not advance					
Victoria Rodríguez	Women's singles	Bye	B Volk (SLO); W 6-1, 6-0	M Capadocia (PHI); W 0-RET	P Czarnik (POL); W 6-2, 6-0	P Cheapchandej (THA); L 2-6, 3-6	Did not advance		
Giovanna Manifacio; Victoria Rodríguez	Women's doubles	—N/a		T Fleming / J Hart (USA); L 7-5, 3-6, 8-10	Did not advance				
Alonso Delgado; María Espíndola	Mixed doubles	—N/a		K Kapitány / G Madarász (HUN); L 3-6, 5-7	Did not advance				

== Volleyball ==
=== Men's tournament ===
Preliminary round

Pos	Team	Pld	W	L	Pts	SW	SL	SR	SPW	SPL	SPR	Qualification
1	Ukraine	4	4	0	11	12	2	6.000	335	285	1.175	Quarterfinals
2	Portugal	4	3	1	8	9	6	1.500	342	333	1.027	Quarterfinals
3	South Korea	4	2	2	8	10	8	1.250	418	383	1.091	9th–16th place
4	Mexico	4	1	3	3	4	9	0.444	295	324	0.910	9th–16th place
5	Latvia	4	0	4	0	2	12	0.167	282	347	0.813	17th–22nd place

Date	Time		Score		Set 1	Set 2	Set 3	Set 4	Set 5	Total	Report
20 Aug	13:00	Mexico	0–3	Ukraine	20–25	22–25	24–26			66–76	P2 P3
21 Aug	15:00	Latvia	0–3	Mexico	22–25	22–25	19–25			63–75	P2 P3
24 Aug	18:00	Mexico	0–3	Portugal	23–25	15–25	21–25			59–75	P2 P3
25 Aug	20:00	South Korea	3–1	Mexico	25–20	23–25	37–35	25–15		110–95	P2P3

9th–16th place quarterfinals

Date	Time		Score		Set 1	Set 2	Set 3	Set 4	Set 5	Total	Report
27 Aug	13:00	France	3–0	Mexico	25–23	25–13	25–21			75–57	

13th–16th place semifinals

Date	Time		Score		Set 1	Set 2	Set 3	Set 4	Set 5	Total	Report
28 Aug	13:00	Mexico	3–1	Romania	25–21	18–25	25–19	27–25		95–90	P2 P3

13th place match

Date	Time		Score		Set 1	Set 2	Set 3	Set 4	Set 5	Total	Report
29 Aug	15:00	Mexico	0–3	South Korea	22–25	20–25	22–25			64–75	P2 P3

Final rank

- 14th

=== Women's tournament ===
Preliminary round

Pos	Team	Pld	W	L	Pts	SW	SL	SR	SPW	SPL	SPR	Qualification
1	Russia	3	3	0	9	9	1	9.000	246	180	1.367	Quarterfinals
2	Finland	3	2	1	6	6	3	2.000	204	182	1.121	Quarterfinals
3	Brazil	3	1	2	3	4	6	0.667	213	219	0.973	
4	Mexico	3	0	3	0	0	9	0.000	143	225	0.636	

Date	Time		Score		Set 1	Set 2	Set 3	Set 4	Set 5	Total	Report
21 Aug	18:00	Mexico	0–3	Russia	20–25	9–25	15–25	–	–	44–75	P2 P3
22 Aug	18:00	Brazil	3–0	Mexico	25–21	25–11	25–16			75–48	P2 P3
23 Aug	18:00	Mexico	0–3	Finland	18–25	19–25	14–25			51–75	P2 P3

9th–16th place quarterfinals

Date	Time		Score		Set 1	Set 2	Set 3	Set 4	Set 5	Total	Report
25 Aug	20:00	Mexico	2–3	United States	25–20	20–25	10–25	25–21	12–15	92–106	P2P3

13th–16th place semifinals

Date	Time		Score		Set 1	Set 2	Set 3	Set 4	Set 5	Total	Report
26 Aug	18:00	Canada	3–0	Mexico	25–15	25–22	25–17	–	–	75–54	P2P3

15th place match

Date	Time		Score		Set 1	Set 2	Set 3	Set 4	Set 5	Total	Report
27 Aug	13:00	Mexico	3–1	Colombia	18–25	25–11	25–23	25–16	–	93–75	P2P3

Final ranking

- 15th

== Weightlifting ==
Athlete	Event	Snatch		Clean & Jerk		Total	Rank
Athlete	Event	Result	Rank	Result	Rank	Total	Rank
Jefreey Gumez	Men's 56 kg	102	7	122	13	224	11
Antonio Vázquez	Men's 62 kg	125	4	165	2	290	2nd place, silver medalist(s)
Jonathan Muñoz	Men's 69 kg	135	9	168	6	303	8
María Barco	Women's 48 kg	60	15	78	13	138	15
Guadalupe Villa	Women's 48 kg	70	7	88	8	158	9
Carolina Lugo	Women's 58 kg	84	7	111	5	195	6
María Aguinaga	Women's 69 kg	85	14	114	8	199	12
Aremi Fuentes	Women's 90 kg	105	3	127	4	232	4
Gladis Bueno	Women's +90 kg	104	3	127	6	231	5
