= Diving at the 2017 Summer Universiade =

2017 Summer Universiade in Taiwan

Diving at the XXIX Summer Universiade
- Venue: University of Taipei (Tianmu) Shin-hsin Hall B1 Diving Pool
- Dates: 20–27 August 2017
- Competitors: 106 from 23 nations

Diving was contested at the 2017 Summer Universiade from August 20 to 27 at the Aquatics Palace in Taipei, Taiwan.

== Participating nations ==
A total of 106 athletes from 24 nations is being competing in diving at the 2017 Summer Universiade:

- Armenia (2)
- Australia (5)
- Brazil (4)
- Canada (5)
- Chinese Taipei (2) (H)
- Croatia (1)
- Germany (8)
- Ireland (2)
- Italy (6)
- Japan (5)
- Lithuania (1)
- Macau (4)
- Mexico (10)
- North Korea (7)
- Philippines (1)
- Poland (2)
- Romania (1)
- Russia (12)
- South Korea (4)
- Sweden (1)
- Switzerland (2)
- Ukraine (8)
- United States (13)

== Schedule ==
All times are Taiwan Standard Time (UTC+08:00)

Date	Time	Event	Phase
Sunday, 20 August 2017	10:00	Women's 1 metre springboard	Preliminary
Sunday, 20 August 2017	13:00	Women's 1 metre springboard	Semifinals Group A
Sunday, 20 August 2017	13:30	Women's 1 metre springboard	Semifinals Group B
Sunday, 20 August 2017	14:30	Women's 1 metre springboard	Final
Sunday, 20 August 2017	16:00	Men's Synchronized 10 metre platform	Final
Monday, 21 August 2017	10:00	Men's 1 metre springboard	Preliminary
Monday, 21 August 2017	13:00	Men's 1 metre springboard	Semifinals Group A
Monday, 21 August 2017	13:35	Men's 1 metre springboard	Semifinals Group B
Monday, 21 August 2017	14:35	Men's 1 metre springboard	Final
Monday, 21 August 2017	16:15	Women's Synchronized 10 metre platform	Final
Tuesday, 22 August 2017	13:30	Women's 10 metre platform	Preliminary
Tuesday, 22 August 2017	14:30	Women's 10 metre platform	Semifinal
Tuesday, 22 August 2017	16:00	Mixed Synchronized 3 metre springboard	Final
Wednesday, 23 August 2017	10:00	Men's 3 metre springboard	Preliminary
Wednesday, 23 August 2017	13:30	Men's 3 metre springboard	Semifinal
Wednesday, 23 August 2017	16:00	Women's 10 metre platform	Final
Tuesday, 24 August 2017	13:00	Mixed Synchronized 10 metre platform	Final
Tuesday, 24 August 2017	14:45	Men's 3 metre springboard	Final
Tuesday, 24 August 2017	16:45	Women's Synchronized 3 metre springboard	Final
Friday, 25 August 2017	10:00	Women's 3 metre springboard	Premilinary
Friday, 25 August 2017	13:00	Women's 3 metre springboard	Semifinal
Friday, 25 August 2017	16:00	Men's Synchronized 3 metre springboard	Final
Saturday, 26 August 2017	10:00	Men's 10 metre platform	Premilinary
Saturday, 26 August 2017	13:00	Men's 10 metre platform	Semifinal
Saturday, 26 August 2017	16:00	Women's 3 metre springboard	Final
Sunday, 27 August 2017	13:00	Men's 10 metre platform	Final
Sunday, 27 August 2017	15:00	Mixed Team	Final
Sunday, 27 August 2017	16:40	Men's Team Classification	Final
Sunday, 27 August 2017	16:55	Women's Team Classification	Final

== Medal summary ==
=== Medal table ===
Rank	Nation	Gold	Silver	Bronze	Total
1	North Korea	5	3	0	8
2	Russia	4	3	3	10
3	Mexico	4	0	1	5
4	South Korea	1	3	3	7
5	Ukraine	1	1	0	2
6	United States	0	3	1	4
7	Canada	0	1	1	2
8	Australia	0	1	0	1
9	Italy	0	0	3	3
10	Germany	0	0	2	2
11	Japan	0	0	1	1
Totals (11 entries)		15	15	15	45

=== Men's events ===
Event	Gold	Silver	Bronze
1 metre springboard	Kim Yeong-nam; South Korea	Briadam Herrera; United States	Evgeny Kuznetsov; Russia
3 metre springboard	Ilya Zakharov; Russia	Evgeny Kuznetsov; Russia	Giovanni Tocci; Italy
10 metre platform	Ri Hyon-ju; North Korea	David Dinsmore; United States	Kim Yeong-nam; South Korea
Synchronized 3 metre springboard	Russia (RUS); Ilya Zakharov; Evgeny Kuznetsov	South Korea (KOR); Woo Ha-ram; Kim yeong-nam	Italy (ITA); Gabriele Auber; Lorenzo Marsaglia
Synchronized 10 metre platform	Russia (RUS); Roman Izmailov; Nikita Shleikher	North Korea (PRK); Hyon Il-myong; Ri Hyon-ju	South Korea (KOR); Kim Yeong-nam; Woo Ha-ram
Team classification	Russia (RUS)	South Korea (KOR)	Mexico (MEX)

=== Women's events ===
Event	Gold	Silver	Bronze
1 metre springboard	Dolores Hernández; Mexico	Choe Un-gyong; North Korea	Louisa Stawczynski; Germany
3 metre springboard	Arantxa Chavez; Mexico	Brooke Christin Schultz; United States	Kim Su-ji; South Korea
10 metre platform	Kim Kuk-hyang; North Korea	Kim Un-hyang; North Korea	Celina Jayne Toth; Canada
Synchronized 3 metre springboard	Mexico (MEX); Arantxa Chávez; Melany Hernández	South Korea (KOR); Kim Nami; Kim Su-ji	Russia (RUS); Maria Polyakova; Yelena Chernykh
Synchronized 10 metre platform	North Korea (PRK); Kim Kuk-hyang; Kim Un-hyang	Australia (AUS); Emily Meaney; Brittany O'Brien	Russia (RUS); Yulia Tikhomirova; Yulia Timoshinina
Team classification	North Korea (PRK)	Russia (RUS)	Japan (JPN)

=== Mixed ===
Event	Gold	Silver	Bronze
Synchronized 3 metre springboard	Mexico (MEX); Adán Zúñiga; Arantxa Chávez	Ukraine (UKR); Stanislav Oliferchyk; Viktoriya Kesar	Italy (ITA); Laura Bilotta; Gabriele Auber
Synchronized 10 metre platform	North Korea (PRK); Kim Kuk-hyang; Hyon Il-myong	Russia (RUS); Nikita Shleikher; Yulia Timoshinina	United States (USA); Joseph Law; Olivia Rosendahl
Mixed team	Ukraine (UKR); Oleksandr Gorshkovozov; Anastasiia Nedobiga	Canada (CAN); Tyler Robert Henschel; Celina Jayne Toth	Germany (GER); Lars Ruediger; Kieu Trang Duong
