= Diving at the 2017 Summer Universiade – Men's 10 metre platform =

Men's 10 metre platform at the Universiade
- Venue: University of Taipei (Tianmu) Shin-hsin Hall B1 Diving Pool
- Dates: 26–27 August 2017
- Competitors: 19 from 12 nations

Medalists
1st place, gold medalist(s)		Ri Hyon-ju	North Korea
2nd place, silver medalist(s)		David Dinsmore	United States
3rd place, bronze medalist(s)		Kim Yeong-nam	South Korea

The men's 10 metre platform diving event at the 2017 Summer Universiade was contested from August 26 to 27 at the University of Taipei (Tianmu) Shin-hsin Hall B1 Diving Pool in Taipei, Taiwan.

== Schedule ==
All times are Taiwan Standard Time (UTC+08:00)

Date	Time	Event
Saturday, 26 August 2017	10:00	Preliminary
Saturday, 26 August 2017	13:00	Semifinals
Sunday, 27 August 2017	13:30	Final

== Results ==
Qualified for the next phase

=== Preliminary ===
Rank	Athlete	Dive						Total
Rank	Athlete	1	2	3	4	5	6	Total
1	Woo Ha-ram (KOR)	66.60	81.60	81.60	63.00	82.25	77.70	452.75
2	Maksym Dolgov (UKR)	72.00	75.90	90.65	74.25	71.40	59.40	443.60
3	Aleksandr Bondar (RUS)	67.20	72.15	70.00	79.20	81.00	68.00	437.55
4	David Dinsmore (USA)	68.80	52.50	84.60	61.05	79.90	79.20	426.05
5	Kim Yeong-nam (KOR)	73.60	66.30	77.40	60.45	66.60	77.40	421.75
6	Jose Diego Balleza Isaias (MEX)	68.80	67.20	54.40	66.60	79.20	78.40	414.60
7	Nikita Shleikher (RUS)	73.60	55.50	64.80	76.50	72.60	70.20	413.20
8	Vladimir Harutyunyan (ARM)	73.60	52.20	51.00	79.90	68.80	82.80	408.30
9	Tyler Robert Henschel (CAN)	78.40	72.00	61.20	61.05	44.55	76.80	394.00
10	Rim Kum-song (PRK)	65.60	63.00	54.40	68.40	63.00	75.20	389.60
11	Roman Izmailov (RUS)	67.20	59.20	72.00	75.60	44.20	64.80	383.00
12	Christopher Joseph Law (USA)	63.00	70.95	60.80	64.80	68.80	53.20	381.55
13	Dashiell Riley Enos (USA)	65.60	58.50	54.00	51.15	63.80	70.40	363.45
14	Ri Hyon-ju (PRK)	81.60	64.75	49.30	33.25	75.60	50.40	354.90
15	Diego Garcia De La Fuente (MEX)	68.80	69.30	51.20	51.00	45.60	64.75	350.65
16	Kazuki Murakami (JPN)	67.20	65.60	45.00	64.50	40.80	67.20	350.30
17	Alexander Jan W Lube (GER)	65.60	46.40	49.50	62.40	54.60	51.00	329.50
18	Jackson Rondinelli (BRA)	17.05	30.00	46.40	54.45	56.00	67.20	271.10
19	Nicholas Malcol Jeffree (AUS)	67.50	64.00	49.50	25.50	21.60	38.40	266.50

=== Semifinal ===
Rank	Athlete	Dive						Total
Rank	Athlete	1	2	3	4	5	6	Total
1	David Dinsmore (USA)	76.80	72.00	75.60	80.85	79.90	86.40	471.55
2	Kim Yeong-nam (KOR)	65.60	90.10	75.60	69.75	81.40	81.00	463.45
3	Maksym Dolgov (UKR)	76.80	74.25	90.65	80.65	56.10	75.60	454.25
4	Ri Hyon-ju (PRK)	80.00	94.35	35.70	73.50	86.40	82.80	452.75
5	Nikita Shleikher (RUS)	72.00	74.00	86.40	69.70	79.20	70.20	451.50
6	Kazuki Murakami (JPN)	57.60	73.60	70.20	76.50	78.20	73.60	429.70
7	Jose Diego Balleza Isaias (MEX)	75.20	81.60	85.00	66.60	39.60	73.60	421.60
8	Tyler Robert Henschel (CAN)	67.20	72.00	73.10	81.40	42.90	72.00	408.60
9	Woo Ha-ram (KOR)	66.60	43.20	71.40	84.60	47.25	94.35	407.40
10	Aleksandr Bondar (RUS)	83.20	49.95	75.25	43.20	84.60	64.60	400.80
11	Christopher Joseph Law (USA)	49.50	69.30	73.60	81.00	68.80	46.20	388.40
12	Jackson Rondinelli (BRA)	65.10	67.50	73.60	21.45	64.00	76.80	368.45
13	Rim Kum-song (PRK)	78.40	51.00	49.30	59.40	61.25	64.00	363.35
14	Alexander Jan W Lube (GER)	62.40	49.60	58.50	65.60	65.80	58.50	360.40
15	Diego Garcia De La Fuente (MEX)	70.40	44.55	46.40	34.00	70.30	79.55	345.20
16	Vladimir Harutyunyan (ARM)	60.80	27.00	72.00	27.20	72.00	75.60	342.60
17	Nicholas Malcol Jeffree (AUS)	67.50	60.80	29.70	52.70	50.40	49.60	310.70

=== Final ===
Rank	Athlete	Dive						Total
Rank	Athlete	1	2	3	4	5	6	Total
1st place, gold medalist(s)	Ri Hyon-ju (PRK)	67.20	86.95	79.90	71.75	91.80	93.60	491.20
2nd place, silver medalist(s)	David Dinsmore (USA)	86.40	60.00	79.20	82.50	76.50	91.80	476.40
3rd place, bronze medalist(s)	Kim Yeong-nam (KOR)	64.00	74.80	91.80	68.20	93.25	91.80	473.85
4	Aleksandr Bondar (RUS)	84.80	72.15	71.75	64.80	86.40	91.80	471.70
5	Woo Ha-ram (KOR)	75.60	76.80	69.70	91.80	50.75	96.20	460.85
6	Jose Diego Balleza Isaias (MEX)	72.00	81.60	73.10	79.20	81.00	61.05	447.95
7	Nikita Shleikher (RUS)	67.20	48.10	86.40	85.00	74.25	73.80	434.75
8	Kazuki Murakami (JPN)	81.60	68.80	41.40	69.00	71.40	70.40	402.60
9	Tyler Robert Henschel (CAN)	76.80	72.00	57.80	57.35	59.40	76.80	400.15
10	Maksym Dolhov (UKR)	81.60	39.60	74.00	62.70	71.40	70.20	399.50
11	Christopher Joseph Law (USA)	67.50	44.55	76.80	73.80	57.60	49.00	369.25
12	Jackson Rondinelli (BRA)	60.45	63.00	60.80	54.45	48.00	49.60	336.30
