= Diving at the 2017 Summer Universiade – Women's 1 metre springboard =

Women's 1 metre springboard at the Universiade
- Venue: University of Taipei (Tianmu) Shin-hsin Hall B1 Diving Pool
- Dates: 20 August 2017
- Competitors: 33 from 18 nations

Medalists
1st place, gold medalist(s)		Dolores Hernández	Mexico
2nd place, silver medalist(s)		Choe Un-gyong	North Korea
3rd place, bronze medalist(s)		Louisa Hannah Stawczynski	Germany

The women's 1 metre springboard diving event at the 2017 Summer Universiade was contested on August 20 at the University of Taipei (Tianmu) Shin-hsin Hall B1 Diving Pool in Taipei, Taiwan.

== Schedule ==
All times are Taiwan Standard Time (UTC+08:00)

Date	Time	Event
Sunday, 20 August 2017	10:00	Preliminary
Sunday, 20 August 2017	13:00	Semifinals Group A
Sunday, 20 August 2017	13:30	Semifinals Group B
Sunday, 20 August 2017	14:30	Final

== Results ==
Qualified for the final
Qualified for the semifinal

=== Preliminary ===
Rank	Athlete	Dive					Total
Rank	Athlete	1	2	3	4	5	Total
1	Maria Polyakova (RUS)	54.00	44.85	54.00	55.90	55.90	264.65
2	Kim Su-ji (KOR)	49.20	58.50	47.15	54.00	46.20	255.05
3	Arantxa Chávez (MEX)	50.40	47.15	51.60	52.00	53.30	254.45
4	Dolores Hernández (MEX)	50.40	50.70	48.30	50.40	54.60	254.40
5	Luana Wanderley Moreira (BRA)	50.40	44.85	57.60	46.80	49.40	249.05
6	Louisa Hannah Stawczynski (GER)	55.20	46.80	48.10	43.70	54.60	248.40
7	Jana Lisa Rother (GER)	48.00	53.30	49.40	48.00	48.30	247.00
8	Ekaterina Nekrasova (RUS)	51.60	50.70	48.30	46.80	49.40	246.80
9	Choe Un-gyong (PRK)	47.15	48.00	45.10	54.60	50.40	245.25
10	Olga Kulemina (RUS)	54.60	53.30	43.70	44.40	49.20	245.20
11	Kim Un-hyang (PRK)	50.40	43.70	54.60	50.40	41.80	240.90
12	Michal Rae Bower (USA)	50.40	41.40	46.80	48.75	50.70	238.05
13	Kim Na-mi (KOR)	42.00	53.30	49.45	42.00	49.50	236.25
14	Elaena Nancy Dick (CAN)	50.40	42.90	39.10	49.20	54.60	236.20
15	Brooke Christin Schultz (USA)	33.80	55.20	43.50	50.70	52.80	234.55
16	Diana Shelestyuk (UKR)	50.40	50.40	44.20	44.85	41.80	231.65
17	Laura Bilotta (ITA)	54.00	50.70	34.50	43.20	48.40	230.80
18	Alison Amaris Gibson (USA)	41.40	51.60	49.40	36.00	50.70	229.10
19	Daniella Sylvia Nero (SWE)	48.10	43.70	33.00	52.00	50.40	226.10
20	Ruby Grace Neave (AUS)	28.60	44.85	43.20	50.40	55.90	222.95
21	Hana Kaneto (JPN)	45.10	45.50	35.65	48.00	43.20	217.45
22	Viktoriya Kesar (UKR)	49.20	59.80	31.05	32.40	41.25	213.70
23	Yuka Mabuchi (JPN)	49.50	16.90	50.40	47.15	46.80	210.75
24	Indre Marija Girdauskaite (LTU)	44.40	46.80	41.40	38.40	35.10	206.10
25	Ganna Krasnoshlyk (UKR)	51.60	40.30	42.55	32.40	36.30	203.15
26	Melany Hernández (MEX)	50.40	42.55	33.60	39.00	37.50	203.05
27	Anca Şerb (ROU)	42.00	46.80	48.30	25.20	40.00	202.30
28	Tammy Takagi (BRA)	49.20	44.85	37.50	15.60	50.70	197.85
29	Paola Flaminio (ITA)	38.50	46.80	36.80	30.00	44.40	196.50
30	Natasha MacManus (IRL)	36.00	33.05	31.05	37.80	46.80	185.25
31	Monique Ann Demaisip (PHI)	39.60	33.80	33.35	38.40	37.80	182.95
32	Ashley Ann Mccool (CAN)	46.80	44.20	46.00	7.20	36.25	180.45
33	Lai Yu-yen (TPE)	43.20	18.00	28.05	32.00	31.50	152.75

=== Semifinal ===
==== Group A ====
Rank	Athlete	Dive					Total
Rank	Athlete	1	2	3	4	5	Total
1	Dolores Hernández (MEX)	54.00	55.90	50.60	51.60	36.40	248.50
2	Louisa Hannah Stawczynski (GER)	54.00	48.00	54.60	44.85	41.60	243.05
3	Michal Rae Bower (USA)	54.00	39.10	43.20	47.50	54.60	238.40
4	Elaena Nancy Dick (CAN)	49.20	42.90	48.30	42.00	52.00	234.40
5	Ekaterina Nekrasova (RUS)	54.00	58.50	34.50	34.80	44.20	226.00

==== Group B ====
Rank	Athlete	Dive					Total
Rank	Athlete	1	2	3	4	5	Total
1	Arantxa Chávez (MEX)	54.00	42.55	55.20	53.30	59.80	264.85
2	Jana Lisa Rother (GER)	52.80	55.90	52.00	50.40	51.75	262.85
3	Choe Un-gyong (PRK)	55.20	49.20	46.20	55.90	54.00	260.50
4	Luana Wanderley Moreira (BRA)	50.40	47.15	54.00	50.70	54.60	256.85
5	Kim Na-mi (KOR)	51.60	46.80	48.30	49.20	50.60	246.50

=== Final ===
Rank	Athlete	Dive					Total
Rank	Athlete	1	2	3	4	5	Total
1st place, gold medalist(s)	Dolores Hernández (MEX)	56.40	54.60	55.20	54.00	58.50	278.70
2nd place, silver medalist(s)	Choe Un-gyong (PRK)	51.75	54.00	49.50	58.50	57.60	271.35
3rd place, bronze medalist(s)	Louisa Hannah Stawczynski (GER)	54.00	51.60	54.60	49.45	58.50	268.15
4	Maria Polyakova (RUS)	43.20	46.00	57.60	58.50	62.40	267.70
5	Arantxa Chávez (MEX)	55.20	48.30	50.40	53.30	58.50	265.70
6	Kim Su-ji (KOR)	45.60	50.70	51.75	58.80	49.50	256.35
7	Michal Rae Bower (USA)	54.00	47.15	55.20	45.00	54.60	255.95
8	Jana Lisa Rother (GER)	43.20	48.10	50.70	50.40	48.30	240.70
