= Diving at the 2017 Summer Universiade – Men's synchronized 10 metre platform =

Men's synchronized 10 metre platform at the Universiade
- Venue: University of Taipei (Tianmu) Shin-hsin Hall B1 Diving Pool
- Dates: 20 August 2017
- Competitors: 12 from 6 nations

Medalists
1st place, gold medalist(s)		Roman Izmailov; Nikita Shleikher	Russia
2nd place, silver medalist(s)		Hyon Il-myong; Ri Hyon-ju	North Korea
3rd place, bronze medalist(s)		Woo Ha-ram; Kim Yeong-nam	South Korea

The men's synchronized 10 metre platform diving event at the 2017 Summer Universiade was contested on August 20 at the University of Taipei (Tianmu) Shin-hsin Hall B1 Diving Pool in Taipei, Taiwan.

== Schedule ==
All times are Taiwan Standard Time (UTC+08:00)

Date	Time	Event
Tuesday, 20 August 2017	16:00	Final

== Results ==
=== Final ===
Rank	Athlete	Dive						Total
Rank	Athlete	1	2	3	4	5	6	Total
1st place, gold medalist(s)	Roman Izmailov (RUS); Nikita Shleikher (RUS)	49.20	52.80	76.80	79.92	76.59	76.68	411.99
2nd place, silver medalist(s)	Hyon Il-myong (PRK); Ri Hyon-ju (PRK)	42.00	51.00	81.60	73.26	79.68	83.16	410.70
3rd place, bronze medalist(s)	Woo Ha-ram (KOR); Kim Yeong-nam (KOR)	48.60	52.20	71.40	70.20	73.26	75.60	391.26
4	Oleksandr Gorshkovozov (UKR); Maksym Dolgov (UKR)	47.40	47.40	80.64	75.84	58.83	75.60	385.71
5	Jahir Ocampo (MEX); Jose Diego Balleza Isaias (MEX)	50.40	48.60	76.50	81.60	54.06	65.28	376.44
6	Vladimir Harutyunyan (ARM); Azat Harutyunyan (ARM)	51.60	51.60	70.08	61.44	66.60	57.42	358.74
