= Weightlifting at the 2017 Summer Universiade – Men's 62 kg =

Men's 62 kg at the XXIX Summer Universiade
- Venues: Tamkang University Shao-Mo Memorial Gymnasium 7F
- Dates: 20 August 2017
- Competitors: 15 from 13 nations

Medalists
1st place, gold medalist(s)		Sin Chol-bom	North Korea
2nd place, silver medalist(s)		Antonio Vázquez Méndez	Mexico
3rd place, bronze medalist(s)		Kao Chan-hung	Chinese Taipei

The men's 62 kg event at the 2017 Summer Universiade was held on 20 August at the Tamkang University Shao-Mo Memorial Gymnasium 7F.

== Records ==
Prior to this competition, the existing world and Universiade records were as follows.

- Initial records

Category		Nation	Athlete	Record	Place	Date	Meet
World record	Snatch	North Korea	Kim Un-guk	154 kg	Incheon, South Korea	21 September 2014	2014 Asian Games
World record	Clean & Jerk	China	Chen Lijun	183 kg	Houston, United States	21 November 2015	2015 World Championships
World record	Total	China	Chen Lijun	333 kg	Houston, United States	21 November 2015	2015 World Championships
Universiade records	Snatch	Indonesia (INA)	Eko Yuli Irawan	140 kg	Shenzhen, China	14 August 2011	2011 Summer Universiade
Universiade records	Clean & Jerk	Indonesia (INA)	Eko Yuli Irawan	170 kg	Shenzhen, China	14 August 2011	2011 Summer Universiade
Universiade records	Total	Indonesia (INA)	Eko Yuli Irawan	310 kg	Shenzhen, China	14 August 2011	2011 Summer Universiade

- Broken records

Category		Nation	Athlete	Record	Place	Date
Universiade records	Clean & Jerk	North Korea	Sin Chol-bom	171 kg	New Taipei, Taiwan	20 August 2017

== Results ==
Rank	Athlete	Group	Body weight	Snatch (kg)				Clean & Jerk (kg)				Total
Rank	Athlete	Group	Body weight	1	2	3	Result	1	2	3	Result	Total
1st place, gold medalist(s)	Sin Chol-bom (PRK)	A	61.93	127	132	~~135~~	132	166	171	~~173~~	171 UR	303
2nd place, silver medalist(s)	Antonio Vázquez Méndez (MEX)	A	61.94	118	122	125	125	160	165	172	165	290
3rd place, bronze medalist(s)	Kao Chan-hung (TPE)	A	61.75	125	128	131	131	155	158	~~160~~	158	289
4	Hurşit Atak (TUR)	A	61.95	~~123~~	~~123~~	123	123	155	~~163~~	~~163~~	155	278
5	Huang Ding-chieh (TPE)	A	61.89	115	~~120~~	~~120~~	115	147	153	~~156~~	153	268
6	Yaroslav Zabolotnyi (UKR)	A	61.51	113	116	120	120	135	140	~~144~~	140	260
7	Mahammad Mammadli (AZE)	A	61.87	112	116	~~120~~	116	~~140~~	~~140~~	140	140	256
8	Dmytro Sukhotskyi (UKR)	B	61.83	110	114	117	117	132	135	~~140~~	135	252
9	Gabriel Fernandes (BRA)	B	61.48	105	~~110~~	~~110~~	105	130	~~136~~	~~136~~	130	235
10	Ling Wei Phillip Liao (AUS)	B	61.62	92	~~96~~	~~96~~	92	113	117	~~120~~	117	209
11	Muhammad Arslan (PAK)	B	60.18	90	~~96~~	~~97~~	90	110	~~117~~	~~117~~	110	200
	Nuwan D. Ranasinghe (SRI)	B	61.80	~~75~~	75	~~80~~	75	~~105~~	~~105~~	~~105~~	–	–
	Farkhad Kharki (KAZ)	A	61.86	122	~~126~~	127	127	~~160~~	~~160~~	–	–	–
	Jayadi Jayadi (INA)	A	61.47	~~110~~	110	~~114~~	110	~~135~~	~~137~~	137	–	–
	Ion Terna (MDA)	A	62.00	~~115~~	~~115~~	~~115~~	–	–	–	–	–	DNF
