= Diving at the 2017 Summer Universiade – Men's team classification =

Men's team classification at the Universiade
- Venue: University of Taipei (Tianmu) Shin-hsin Hall B1 Diving Pool
- Dates: 27 August 2017
- Teams: 19

Medalists
1st place, gold medalist(s)		Russia (RUS)
2nd place, silver medalist(s)		South Korea (KOR)
3rd place, bronze medalist(s)		Mexico (MEX)

The men' teams classification diving event at the 2017 Summer Universiade was contested from August 27 at the University of Taipei (Tianmu) Shin-hsin Hall B1 Diving Pool in Taipei, Taiwan.

== Schedule ==
All times are Taiwan Standard Time (UTC+08:00)

Date	Time	Event
Sunday, 27 August 2017	16:40	Final

== Results ==
Rank	Team	1M		3M		10M		3MS	10MS	M3MS	M10MS	MT	Total
1st place, gold medalist(s)	Russia (RUS)	400.95	375.20	453.35	386.75	437.55	413.20	428.07	411.99	133.25	152.40	168.53	3761.23
2nd place, silver medalist(s)	South Korea (KOR)	375.25	361.60	422.80	416.75	452.75	421.75	417.93	391.26	131.91		173.93	3565.93
3rd place, bronze medalist(s)	Mexico (MEX)	369.45	350.00	451.20	366.25	414.60	350.65	383.37	376.44	151.01	124.89	175.65	3513.51
4	United States (USA)	398.45	332.40	387.25	370.85	426.05	381.55	383.46		137.10	134.76	162.03	3113.90
5	Ukraine (UKR)	385.75	327.55	416.00	303.05	443.60		383.79	385.71	142.32		199.45	2987.22
6	Germany (GER)	360.35	354.40	414.65	351.00	329.50		348.18		132.60	130.44	176.58	2597.70
7	Italy (ITA)	370.20	347.70	419.10	365.30			387.12		138.57		144.40	2172.39
8	North Korea (PRK)	286.05				389.60	354.90		410.70	127.83	168.39	158.45	1895.92
9	Poland (POL)	340.25	296.25	390.65	313.05			353.40					1693.60
10	Canada (CAN)	335.10		374.70	371.85	394.00						181.40	1657.05
11	Switzerland (SUI)	287.05	263.65	326.15	309.05			341.34					1527.24
12	Japan (JPN)	338.40		392.85		350.30				133.59		174.15	1389.29
13	Brazil (BRA)	300.65		346.15		271.10							917.90
14	Armenia (ARM)					408.30			358.74				767.04
15	Ireland (IRL)	296.95		305.35									602.30
16	Croatia (CRO)	226.85		316.20									543.05
17	Macau (MAC)			278.10				260.82					538.92
18	Australia (AUS)					266.50					132.27		398.77
19	Chinese Taipei (TPE)	188.80								88.76			277.56
