= Weightlifting at the 2017 Summer Universiade – Women's 48 kg =

Women's 48 kg at the XXIX Summer Universiade
- Venues: Tamkang University Shao-Mo Memorial Gymnasium 7F
- Dates: 20 August 2017
- Competitors: 16 from 12 nations

Medalists
| 1st place, gold medalist(s) | | Ri Song-gum | North Korea |
| 2nd place, silver medalist(s) | | Beatriz Pirón | Dominican Republic |
| 3rd place, bronze medalist(s) | | Sri Wahyuni Agustiani | Indonesia |

The women's 48 kg event at the 2017 Summer Universiade was held on 20 August at the Tamkang University Shao-Mo Memorial Gymnasium 7F.

== Records ==
Prior to this competition, the existing world and Universiade records were as follows.

- Initial records

| Category | | Nation | Athlete | Record | Place | Date | Meet |
|---|---|---|---|---|---|---|---|
| World record | Snatch | China | Yang Lian | 98 kg | Santo Domingo, Dominican Republic | 1 October 2006 | 2006 World Championships |
| World record | Clean & Jerk | Turkey | Nurcan Taylan | 121 kg | Antalya, Turkey | 17 September 2010 | 2010 World Championships |
| World record | Total | China | Yang Lian | 217 kg | Santo Domingo, Dominican Republic | 1 October 2006 | 2006 World Championships |
| Universiade records | Snatch | China (CHN) | Xiao Hongyu | 87 kg | Kazan, Russia | 7 July 2013 | 2013 Summer Universiade |
| Universiade records | Clean & Jerk | China (CHN) | Xiao Hongyu | 108 kg | Shenzhen, China | 13 August 2011 | 2011 Summer Universiade |
| Universiade records | Total | China (CHN) | Xiao Hongyu | 188 kg | Shenzhen, China | 13 August 2011 | 2011 Summer Universiade |

- Broken record

| Category | | Nation | Athlete | Record | Place | Date |
|---|---|---|---|---|---|---|
| Universiade records | Total | North Korea | Ri Song-gum | 189 kg | New Taipei, Taiwan | 20 August 2017 |

== Results ==
| Rank | Athlete | Group | Body weight | Snatch (kg) | | | | Clean & Jerk (kg) | | | | Total |
| Rank | Athlete | Group | Body weight | 1 | 2 | 3 | Result | 1 | 2 | 3 | Result | Total |
|---|---|---|---|---|---|---|---|---|---|---|---|---|
| 1st place, gold medalist(s) | Ri Song-gum (PRK) | A | 47.84 | 81 | 84 | 86 | 86 | 103 | 107 | ~~111~~ | 107 | 193 UR |
| 2nd place, silver medalist(s) | Beatriz Pirón (DOM) | A | 47.98 | 81 | ~~85~~ | 85 | 85 | 98 | 103 | ~~106~~ | 103 | 188 |
| 3rd place, bronze medalist(s) | Sri Wahyuni Agustiani (INA) | A | 47.96 | ~~77~~ | 77 | ~~82~~ | 77 | ~~100~~ | 100 | ~~106~~ | 100 | 177 |
| 4 | Luana Oliveira (BRA) | A | 47.47 | ~~76~~ | 76 | ~~78~~ | 76 | 88 | ~~92~~ | 94 | 94 | 170 |
| 5 | Ibuki Takahashi (JPN) | A | 47.57 | 67 | 70 | 72 | 72 | 91 | ~~96~~ | 96 | 96 | 168 |
| 6 | Rira Suzuki (JPN) | A | 46.43 | ~~66~~ | 66 | 68 | 68 | 87 | 91 | 93 | 93 | 161 |
| 7 | Anhelina Lomachynska (UKR) | A | 47.67 | 68 | 71 | 73 | 73 | ~~87~~ | 87 | ~~92~~ | 87 | 160 |
| 8 | Lisa Indriyani (INA) | A | 46.83 | ~~70~~ | 70 | ~~75~~ | 70 | ~~90~~ | 90 | 95 | 90 | 160 |
| 9 | S. Guadalupe Villa Soto (MEX) | A | 47.47 | 67 | ~~70~~ | 70 | 70 | 85 | 88 | ~~91~~ | 88 | 158 |
| 10 | Shannon L. McNames (USA) | B | 47.76 | 65 | 68 | 70 | 70 | 84 | ~~86~~ | ~~86~~ | 84 | 154 |
| 11 | Lee Seul-ki (KOR) | A | 47.70 | ~~65~~ | ~~65~~ | 65 | 65 | 85 | ~~90~~ | ~~90~~ | 85 | 150 |
| 12 | Nathasha Rosa (BRA) | B | 47.97 | 65 | ~~70~~ | ~~70~~ | 65 | 75 | 80 | 83 | 83 | 148 |
| 13 | Noorin Mahomed Gulam (GBR) | B | 47.86 | 65 | 67 | ~~69~~ | 67 | 74 | ~~81~~ | ~~82~~ | 74 | 141 |
| 14 | Surya Elvy Sundqvist (SWE) | B | 47.20 | ~~63~~ | 63 | ~~66~~ | 63 | 74 | 77 | ~~81~~ | 77 | 140 |
| 15 | Maria Isabel Barco (MEX) | B | 47.58 | 55 | ~~58~~ | 60 | 60 | 76 | 78 | ~~81~~ | 78 | 138 |
| | Ana Isabel Arce (COL) | B | 47.17 | 56 | 60 | ~~62~~ | 60 | ~~76~~ | ~~76~~ | ~~76~~ | – | – |
