= Roller Sports at the 2017 Summer Universiade – Women's 1000 metres sprint =

Women's 1000 metres sprint at the XXIX Summer Universiade
- Venues: Yingfeng Riverside Park Roller Sports Rink (A)
- Dates: 22 August
- Competitors: 21 from 13 nations

Medalists
| 1st place, gold medalist(s) | | Yang Ho-chen | Chinese Taipei |
| 2nd place, silver medalist(s) | | Li Meng-chu | Chinese Taipei |
| 3rd place, bronze medalist(s) | | An Yi-seul | South Korea |

The women's 1000 metres sprint event at the 2017 Summer Universiade was held on 22 August at the Yingfeng Riverside Park Roller Sports Rink (A).

== Record ==
| Category | Athlete | Record | Date | Place |
|---|---|---|---|---|
| World record | (Chinese Taipei) Huang Yu-ting | 1.26.835 | 17 November 2015 | Kaoshiung, Taiwan |

== Results ==
| Qualified for the next phase |

=== Semifinal ===
| Rank | Heat | Athlete | Time | Results |
|---|---|---|---|---|
| 1 | 3 | Li Meng-chu (TPE) | 1:31.798 | Q |
| 2 | 3 | Jeong Eun-chae (KOR) | 1:32.431 | q |
| 3 | 3 | Agnese Cerri (ITA) | 1:32.962 | q |
| 4 | 2 | Yang Ho-chen (TPE) | 1:33.041 | Q |
| 5 | 3 | Yuri Yoshino (JPN) | 1:33.602 | q |
| 6 | 1 | An Yi-seul (KOR) | 1:33.797 | Q |
| 7 | 3 | Dominika Gardi (HUN) | 1:33.859 | q |
| 8 | 1 | Katharina Isabe Rumpus (GER) | 1:33.893 | q |
| 9 | 2 | Mayerly Amaya Villamizar (COL) | 1:33.896 | |
| 10 | 2 | Wong Vanessa Natalie (HKG) | 1:33.910 | |
| 11 | 1 | Karen Dayanna Restrepo Rengifo (COL) | 1:33.918 | |
| 12 | 2 | Nadja Wenger (SUI) | 1:34.094 | |
| 13 | 1 | Benedetta Rossini (ITA) | 1:34.320 | |
| 14 | 1 | Mayu Goto (JPN) | 1:34.579 | |
| 15 | 2 | Rina Jasmin Von Burg (SUI) | 1:34.960 | |
| 16 | 2 | Berenice Molina Villafuerte (MEX) | 1:35.074 | |
| 17 | 1 | Eleonora Kopilovic (HUN) | 1:36.215 | |
| 18 | 3 | Lotte Kaars (NZL) | 1:41.433 | |
| 19 | 3 | Anna Pristalova (RUS) | 1:42.051 | |
| 20 | 2 | Anna Seldimirova (RUS) | 1:49.117 | |
| | 1 | Tadeja Donka (SLO) | DNS | |

=== Final ===
| Rank | Athlete | Results |
|---|---|---|
| 1st place, gold medalist(s) | Yang Ho-chen (TPE) | 1:34.805 |
| 2nd place, silver medalist(s) | Li Meng-chu (TPE) | 1:34.884 |
| 3rd place, bronze medalist(s) | An Yi-seul (KOR) | 1:35.002 |
| 4 | Katharina Isabe Rumpus (GER) | 1:36.425 |
| 5 | Jeong Eun-chae (KOR) | 1:36.502 |
| 6 | Agnese Cerri (ITA) | 1:36.993 |
| 7 | Dominika Gardi (HUN) | 1:37.232 |
| 8 | Yuri Yoshino (JPN) | 1:38.656 |
