= Roller Sports at the 2017 Summer Universiade – Men's 1000 metres sprint =

Men's 1000 metres sprint at the XXIX Summer Universiade
- Venues: Yingfeng Riverside Park Roller Sports Rink (A)
- Dates: 22 August
- Competitors: 23 from 14 nations

Medalists
1st place, gold medalist(s)		Huang Yu-lin	Chinese Taipei
2nd place, silver medalist(s)		Ko Fu-shiuan	Chinese Taipei
3rd place, bronze medalist(s)		Jeong Byeong-kwan	South Korea

The men's 1000 metres sprint event at the 2017 Summer Universiade was held on 22 August at the Yingfeng Riverside Park Roller Sports Rink (A).

== Record ==
Category	Athlete	Record	Date	Place
World record	(Belgium) Bart Swings	1:20.923	25 August 2013	Ostend, Belgium

== Results ==
Qualified for the next phase

=== Semifinal ===
Rank	Heat	Athlete	Time	Results
1	2	Giuseppe Bramante (ITA)	1:23.553	Q
2	2	Huang Yu-lin (TPE)	1:23.661	q
3	2	Ko Fu-shiuan (TPE)	1:23.717	q
4	3	Carlos Esteban Perez Canaval (COL)	1:23.836	Q
5	2	Tobias Hecht (GER)	1:23.913	q
6	3	Heo Bong (KOR)	1:23.950	q
7	3	Thimo Kiesslich (GER)	1:24.004	q
8	3	Jakob Ulreich (AUT)	1:24.512	
9	2	Thomas Petutschnigg (AUT)	1:24.521	
10	3	Cristian Sartorato (ITA)	1:24.623	
11	2	Fabian Istvan Dieterle (HUN)	1:25.150	
12	1	Jeong Byeong-kwan (KOR)	1:26.453	Q
13	1	Kengo Kawabata (JPN)	1:26.590	
14	1	Johan Sebastian Cabrera Orjuela (COL)	1:26.897	
15	1	Matej Pravda (CZE)	1:27.377	
16	1	Katsuki Kato (JPN)	1:27.682	
17	1	Claudio Garcia Carrillo (MEX)	1:28.368	
18	3	Ben Jesper Sorg (SUI)	1:29.727	
19	3	Miha Remic (SLO)	1:31.277	
20	3	Maksim Gutsalov (RUS)	1:36.230	
21	2	Kiriil Vinokurov (RUS)	1:36.310	
22	2	Anton Kapustsin (BLR)	1:36.452	
23	1	Tomáš Brabenec (CZE)	1:38.955	

=== Final ===
Rank	Athlete	Results
1st place, gold medalist(s)	Huang Yu-lin (TPE)	1:24.020
2nd place, silver medalist(s)	Ko Fu-shiuan (TPE)	1:24.476
3rd place, bronze medalist(s)	Jeong Byeong-kwan (KOR)	1:24.520
4	Thimo Kiesslich (GER)	1:24.613
5	Heo Bong (KOR)	1:24.812
6	Giuseppe Bramante (ITA)	1:25.964
7	Tobias Hecht (GER)	1:27.056
8	Carlos Esteban Perez Canaval (COL)	1:29.708
