= Golf at the 2017 Summer Universiade – Men's individual =

Men's individual at the XXIX Summer Universiade
- Venue: Sunrise Golf & Country Club
- Dates: 24 August 2017 – 26 August 2017
- Competitors: 69 from 29 nations

Medalists
1st place, gold medalist(s)		Raúl Pereda de la Huerta	Mexico
2nd place, silver medalist(s)		Kazuki Higa	Japan
3rd place, bronze medalist(s)		Liu Yung-hua	Chinese Taipei
3rd place, bronze medalist(s)		Kevin Yu	Chinese Taipei

The men's individual golf event at the 2017 Summer Universiade was held 24–26 August at the Sunrise Golf and Country Club in Taoyuan, Taiwan.

== Final results ==
Rank	Athlete	Round 1	Round 2	Round 3	Total	To par
1st place, gold medalist(s)	Raúl Pereda de la Huerta (MEX)	64	65	67	200	−16
2nd place, silver medalist(s)	Kazuki Higa (JPN)	63	66	73	202	−14
T (bronze)	Liu Yung-hua (TPE)	69	67	71	207	−9
T (bronze)	Kevin Yu (TPE)	67	69	71	207	−9
T5	Daiki Imano (JPN)	70	66	72	208	−8
T5	Tanapat Pichaikool (THA)	69	69	70	208	−8
T7	M. Afif Muhammad Razif (MAS)	66	72	72	210	−6
T7	Loris Schüpbach (SUI)	72	71	67	210	−6
9	Álvaro Ortiz (MEX)	73	67	71	211	−5
T10	Matthew Cheung Hung Hai (HKG)	72	71	70	213	−3
T10	Kim Seong-hyeon (KOR)	71	75	67	213	−3
T12	Frédéric Lacroix (FRA)	71	73	70	214	−2
T12	Franck Médale (FRA)	72	74	68	214	−2
T14	Branimir-Ante Gudelj (SRB)	72	72	71	215	−1
T14	Takumi Kanaya (JPN)	72	74	69	215	−1
T16	Choi Jae-hun (KOR)	70	73	73	216	E
T16	Alessandro Nicc Noseda (SUI)	70	72	74	216	E
T18	Kyle Raymond De Beer (RSA)	75	73	69	217	+1
T18	Mihailo Dimitrijević (SRB)	73	76	68	217	+1
T18	Austin Nolan Br Ryan (CAN)	74	72	71	217	+1
T21	Filippo Campigli (ITA)	69	75	74	218	+2
T21	Eric Thomas Flockhart (CAN)	72	74	72	218	+2
T21	Luis Gerardo Garza Morfin (MEX)	79	70	69	218	+2
T21	Varuth Khachonkittisakul (THA)	71	80	67	218	+2
T21	Oh Seung-taek (KOR)	73	74	71	218	+2
T21	Jan Jakub Szmidt (POL)	78	70	70	218	+2
T27	João Girão Almeida (POR)	71	74	74	219	+3
T27	Yair Shmuel Thaler (ISR)	73	76	72	219	+3
29	Miguel Sancholuz (ARG)	72	76	72	220	+4
T30	Lai Chia-i (TPE)	76	73	72	221	+5
T30	Clayton Derick Mansfield (RSA)	71	79	71	221	+5
T30	Truman Kenneth Tai (CAN)	72	79	70	221	+5
T33	Markus Christop Maukner (AUT)	75	72	75	222	+6
T33	Dylan Andrew Rottner (USA)	73	77	72	222	+6
T33	Michael Wong Regan (HKG)	73	76	73	222	+6
T36	Michal Brezovsky (SVK)	74	76	73	223	+7
T36	Dylan Lloyd Naidoo (RSA)	77	69	77	223	+7
T36	Sarun Sirithon (THA)	73	77	73	223	+7
T36	Hubert Dominique Tisserand (FRA)	77	75	71	223	+7
T40	Ng Shing Fung (HKG)	79	75	70	224	+8
T40	Jay Matthew Reyes (PHI)	76	72	76	224	+8
T42	Jonas Christian Magcalayo (PHI)	74	76	75	225	+9
T42	Ivan Monsalve (PHI)	73	79	73	225	+9
44	Sazanur Iman Salenin (MAS)	76	77	74	227	+11
45	Joaquin Luis de Aduriz (ARG)	78	77	75	230	+14
T46	Giacomo Di Gennaro (ITA)	75	78	78	231	+15
T46	Samuel Perelzweig (RUS)	81	72	78	231	+15
T48	Matthew Thomas Andrews (USA)	75	81	77	233	+17
T48	David Nagiev (RUS)	75	76	82	233	+17
T50	Alessandro Cornelio (ITA)	75	78	81	234	+18
T50	Martin Hromadka (CZE)	80	77	77	234	+18
52	Mohd Shakiran Johari (MAS)	76	86	75	237	+21
53	Sebastian Lukas Schredt (LIE)	78	84	76	238	+22
54	Elias Engelbert Schreiber (LIE)	78	81	81	240	+24
55	Marcell Soma Horvath (LIE)	82	78	82	242	+26
T56	Artur Victor Dziugiel (POL)	84	81	79	244	+28
T56	Juan Ignacio Ficco Villa (ARG)	81	83	80	244	+28
T58	David Rozsa (HUN)	81	81	84	246	+30
T58	Sergej Stojiljković (SRB)	82	76	88	246	+30
60	Georgy Chernov (RUS)	88	84	79	251	+35
61	Fabian Tobias Schredt (LIE)	90	83	81	254	+38
62	Marnix Pieter N Bel (NED)	88	88	81	257	+41
63	Temirlan Kaidar (KAZ)	93	78	93	264	+48
64	Nurtay Jaxaliyev (KAZ)	94	89	87	270	+54
65	Jan Kazimierz Szalagan (POL)	91	83	98	272	+56
66	Issatay Jaxaliyev (KAZ)	97	90	86	273	+57
67	David Martinez Carrillo (SUI)	89	95	99	283	+67
	Robert Harry Foley (SUI)	76	72	RT	—N/a	
	Davison Javangwe (ZIM)	WD	—N/a			
