= 2017 Judo Grand Prix Cancún =

Judo competition

Judo 2017 Judo Grand Prix Cancún
- Venue: Polifórum Benito Juárez
- Location: Cancún, Mexico
- Dates: 16–18 June 2017
- Competitors: 185 from 36 nations

Competition at external databases
- Links: IJF • JudoInside

The 2017 Judo Grand Prix Cancún was held at the Polifórum Benito Juárez in Cancún, Mexico, from 16 to 18 June 2017.

== Medal summary ==
=== Men's events ===
| Event | Gold | Silver | Bronze |
|---|---|---|---|
| Extra-lightweight (−60 kg) | Francisco Garrigós (ESP) | Phelipe Pelim (BRA) | Jorre Verstraeten (BEL) |
| Extra-lightweight (−60 kg) | Francisco Garrigós (ESP) | Phelipe Pelim (BRA) | Ashley McKenzie (GBR) |
| Half-lightweight (−66 kg) | Tal Flicker (ISR) | Alberto Gaitero (ESP) | Nabor Castillo (MEX) |
| Half-lightweight (−66 kg) | Tal Flicker (ISR) | Alberto Gaitero (ESP) | Juan Postigos (PER) |
| Lightweight (−73 kg) | Marcelo Contini (BRA) | Tohar Butbul (ISR) | Alexander Turner (USA) |
| Lightweight (−73 kg) | Marcelo Contini (BRA) | Tohar Butbul (ISR) | Alonso Wong (PER) |
| Half-middleweight (−81 kg) | Emmanuel Lucenti (ARG) | Étienne Briand (CAN) | Attila Ungvári (HUN) |
| Half-middleweight (−81 kg) | Emmanuel Lucenti (ARG) | Étienne Briand (CAN) | Victor Penalber (BRA) |
| Middleweight (−90 kg) | Nikoloz Sherazadishvili (ESP) | Tural Safguliyev (AZE) | Nemanja Majdov (SRB) |
| Middleweight (−90 kg) | Nikoloz Sherazadishvili (ESP) | Tural Safguliyev (AZE) | Iván Felipe Silva Morales (CUB) |
| Half-heavyweight (−100 kg) | Peter Paltchik (ISR) | Benjamin Fletcher (GBR) | Andy Granda (CUB) |
| Half-heavyweight (−100 kg) | Peter Paltchik (ISR) | Benjamin Fletcher (GBR) | Philip Awiti-Alcaraz (GBR) |
| Heavyweight (+100 kg) | David Moura (BRA) | Alex García Mendoza (CUB) | Francisco Solis (CHI) |

=== Women's events ===
| Event | Gold | Silver | Bronze |
|---|---|---|---|
| Extra-lightweight (−48 kg) | Gabriela Chibana (BRA) | Edna Carrillo (MEX) | Éva Csernoviczki (HUN) |
| Extra-lightweight (−48 kg) | Gabriela Chibana (BRA) | Edna Carrillo (MEX) | Katelyn Jarrell-Bouyssou (USA) |
| Half-lightweight (−52 kg) | Luz Olvera (MEX) | Sarah Menezes (BRA) | Angelica Delgado (USA) |
| Half-lightweight (−52 kg) | Luz Olvera (MEX) | Sarah Menezes (BRA) | Odette Giuffrida (ITA) |
| Lightweight (−57 kg) | Marti Malloy (USA) | Miryam Roper (PAN) | Sabrina Filzmoser (AUT) |
| Lightweight (−57 kg) | Marti Malloy (USA) | Miryam Roper (PAN) | Anailis Dorvigni (CUB) |
| Half-middleweight (−63 kg) | Ketleyn Quadros (BRA) | Amy Livesey (GBR) | Lubjana Piovesana (GBR) |
| Half-middleweight (−63 kg) | Ketleyn Quadros (BRA) | Amy Livesey (GBR) | Anriquelis Barrios (VEN) |
| Middleweight (−70 kg) | María Bernabéu (ESP) | Sally Conway (GBR) | Elvismar Rodríguez (VEN) |
| Middleweight (−70 kg) | María Bernabéu (ESP) | Sally Conway (GBR) | Gemma Howell (GBR) |
| Half-heavyweight (−78 kg) | Mayra Aguiar (BRA) | Natalie Powell (GBR) | Karen León (VEN) |
| Half-heavyweight (−78 kg) | Mayra Aguiar (BRA) | Natalie Powell (GBR) | Kaliema Antomarchi (CUB) |
| Heavyweight (+78 kg) | Ivana Šutalo (CRO) | Melanie Bolaños (MEX) | Sarah Adlington (GBR) |
| Heavyweight (+78 kg) | Ivana Šutalo (CRO) | Melanie Bolaños (MEX) | Anamari Velenšek (SLO) |

Source Results

=== Medal table ===
* Host nation (Mexico)

| Rank | Nation | Gold | Silver | Bronze | Total |
|---|---|---|---|---|---|
| 1 | Brazil (BRA) | 5 | 2 | 1 | 8 |
| 2 | Spain (ESP) | 3 | 1 | 0 | 4 |
| 3 | Israel (ISR) | 2 | 1 | 0 | 3 |
| 4 | Mexico (MEX)* | 1 | 2 | 1 | 4 |
| 5 | United States (USA) | 1 | 0 | 3 | 4 |
| 6 | Argentina (ARG) | 1 | 0 | 0 | 1 |
| 6 | Croatia (CRO) | 1 | 0 | 0 | 1 |
| 8 | Great Britain (GBR) | 0 | 4 | 5 | 9 |
| 9 | Cuba (CUB) | 0 | 1 | 4 | 5 |
| 10 | Azerbaijan (AZE) | 0 | 1 | 0 | 1 |
| 10 | Canada (CAN) | 0 | 1 | 0 | 1 |
| 10 | Panama (PAN) | 0 | 1 | 0 | 1 |
| 13 | Venezuela (VEN) | 0 | 0 | 3 | 3 |
| 14 | Hungary (HUN) | 0 | 0 | 2 | 2 |
| 14 | Peru (PER) | 0 | 0 | 2 | 2 |
| 16 | Austria (AUT) | 0 | 0 | 1 | 1 |
| 16 | Belgium (BEL) | 0 | 0 | 1 | 1 |
| 16 | Chile (CHI) | 0 | 0 | 1 | 1 |
| 16 | Italy (ITA) | 0 | 0 | 1 | 1 |
| 16 | Serbia (SRB) | 0 | 0 | 1 | 1 |
| 16 | Slovenia (SLO) | 0 | 0 | 1 | 1 |
| Totals (21 entries) | | 14 | 14 | 27 | 55 |
