= Archery at the 2017 Summer Universiade – Mixed team recurve =

Mixed recurve team at the XXIX Summer Universiade
- Venues: National Taiwan Sport University Stadium
- Dates: August 20, 2017 – August 24, 2017
- Competitors: 50 from 25 nations

Medalists
1st place, gold medalist(s)		Lee Seung-yun; Choi Mi-sun	South Korea
2nd place, silver medalist(s)		Mathieu Rene Er. Jimenez; Audrey Adiceom	France
3rd place, bronze medalist(s)		Jorge Ociel Nevárez Cárdenas; Alejandra Valencia	Mexico

The mixed team recurve archery competition at the 2017 Summer Universiade was held in the National Taiwan Sport University Stadium, Taipei, Taiwan between August 20–24, 2017.

== Records ==
Prior to the competition, the world and Universiade records were as follows.

- 144 arrows ranking round

Category	Team	Athlete	Score	Record	Date	Place	Event
Universiade record	South Korea	Lee Seung-yun	693	1379	4 July 2015	Gwangju, South Korea	2015 Summer Universiade
Universiade record	South Korea	Kim Bo-bae	686	1379	4 July 2015	Gwangju, South Korea	2015 Summer Universiade

== Ranking Round ==
Rank	Team	Archer	Individual			Team			Notes
Rank	Team	Archer	Score	10s	Xs	Total	10s	Xs	Notes
1	South Korea	Lee Seung-yun	689	43	18	1376	87	26	Q
1	South Korea	Choi Mi-sun	687	44	8	1376	87	26	Q
2	Chinese Taipei	Wei Chun-heng	665	37	10	1331	73	26	Q
2	Chinese Taipei	Peng Chia-mao	666	36	16	1331	73	26	Q
3	Russia	Arsalan Baldanov	665	30	9	1309	51	19	Q
3	Russia	Tuiana Dashidorzhieva	644	21	10	1309	51	19	Q
4	Poland	Kacper Pawel Sierakowski	657	24	8	1309	49	17	Q
4	Poland	Sylwia Maria Zyzanska	657	24	8	1309	49	17	Q
5	Mexico	Jorge Ociel Nevárez Cárdenas	653	26	11	1302	50	20	Q
5	Mexico	Alejandra Valencia	649	16	5	1302	50	20	Q
6	France	Mathieu Rene Er. Jimenez	651	22	7	1292	43	12	Q
6	France	Audrey Adiceom	641	21	5	1292	43	12	Q
7	Ukraine	Oleksii Hunbin	660	26	8	1292	42	16	Q
7	Ukraine	Daria Pavlichenko	621	17	9	1292	42	16	Q
8	Italy	Massimiliano Mandia	656	28	11	1291	49	16	Q
8	Italy	Claudia Mandia	635	21	5	1291	49	16	Q
9	Moldova	Dan Olaru	659	26	10	1289	42	15	Q
9	Moldova	Alexandra Mîrca	630	16	5	1289	42	15	Q
10	Japan	Wataru Oonuki	663	28	4	1288	39	9	Q
10	Japan	Fumiyo Miyaji	625	11	5	1288	39	9	Q
11	Kazakhstan	Sultan Duzelbayev	659	30	10	1285	49	15	Q
11	Kazakhstan	Farida Tukebayeva	626	19	5	1285	49	15	Q
12	India	Pravin Ramesh Jadhav	652	22	6	1285	37	12	Q
12	India	Monika Saren	633	15	6	1285	37	12	Q
13	Slovakia	Vladimir Hurban	621	20	7	1264	43	13	Q
13	Slovakia	Alexandra Longová	643	23	6	1264	43	13	Q
14	United States	Matthew Joseph Zumbo	639	20	6	1260	37	15	Q
14	United States	Christine Yeri Kim	621	17	9	1260	37	15	Q
15	Hong Kong	Chan Jor Shing	637	18	5	1256	31	12	Q
15	Hong Kong	Wu Sze Yan	619	13	7	1256	31	12	Q
16	Switzerland	Florian Faber	642	18	5	1250	32	9	Q
16	Switzerland	Valentine de Giuli	608	14	4	1250	32	9	Q
17	Malaysia	Atiq Bazil Bakri	628	22	7	1243	36	11	
17	Malaysia	Ezryn Meza Mohamed Hamzah	615	14	4	1243	36	11	
18	Indonesia	Dhia Rahmat	631	20	7	1219	31	9	
18	Indonesia	Risna Oktavia Hardanik	588	11	2	1219	31	9	
19	Estonia	Maert Oona	628	23	6	1204	35	8	
19	Estonia	Bessi Kasak	576	12	2	1204	35	8	
20	Czech Republic	Michal Hlahůlek	604	18	7	1185	25	11	
20	Czech Republic	Jindřiška Vaněčková	581	7	4	1185	25	11	
21	Singapore	Teo Sion Wei Xiang	641	22	6	1179	25	7	
21	Singapore	Quah Kai Zhi	538	3	1	1179	25	7	
22	Norway	Bjoernar Saurdal	570	8	2	1150	17	5	
22	Norway	Line Blomen Ridderstroem	580	9	3	1150	17	5	
23	Sweden	Mikael Alexande Danielsson	598	9	1	1138	16	2	
23	Sweden	Erika Maria Jangnas	540	7	1	1138	16	2	
24	Philippines	Jayson Mendoza	534	4	0	1118	17	1	
24	Philippines	Loren Chloe Balaoing	584	13	1	1118	17	1	
25	Liechtenstein	Marvin John Grischke	602	11	5	1076	19	10	
25	Liechtenstein	Jasmina Büchel	474	8	5	1076	19	10	

== Elimination rounds ==
Round of 16
1	South Korea	6	34	37	38	34
16	Switzerland	2	37	35	31	29
9	Moldova	1	37	34	36
8	Italy	5	38	34	38
5	Mexico	5	35	34	33	35
12	India	3	31	31	35	35
13	Slovakia	0	34	32	34
4	Poland	6	37	36	35
3	Russia	6	39	38	31	34
14	United States	2	32	33	32	31
11	Kazakhstan	3	34	35	30	33
6	France	5	35	32	32	33
7	Ukraine	0	34	35	29
10	Japan	6	36	37	36
15	Hong Kong	0	33	32	26
2	Chinese Taipei	6	36	37	32

Quarterfinals
1	South Korea	6	30	36	37	37
8	Italy	2	31	35	35	35
5	Mexico	5	35	34	36
4	Poland	1	32	34	31
3	Russia	2	38	37	35	33
6	France	6	35	39	37	35
10	Japan	6	35	37	37	38
2	Chinese Taipei	2	32	39	36	36

Semifinals
1	South Korea	6	34	37	38
5	Mexico	0	33	31	34
6	France	6	35	38	36
10	Japan	0	34	36	32

Final
1	South Korea	5	37	36	38	35	19*
6	France	4	36	37	33	36	19
Third place
5	Mexico	5	38	39	35	34	18
10	Japan	4	33	36	37	38	17
