= Philip Awiti-Alcaraz =

British judoka

Personal information
- Nationality: British
- Born: 13 August 1993 (age 32) Enfield, London, England
- Education: University of Wolverhampton
- Occupation: Judoka

Sport
- Country: Great Britain
- Sport: Judo
- Weight class: –100 kg

Achievements and titles
- World Champ.: R32 (2013)
Medal record
Men's judo
Representing Great Britain
IJF Grand Slam
Bronze medal – third place	2016 Abu Dhabi	–100 kg
IJF Grand Prix
Bronze medal – third place	2016 Budapest	–100 kg
Bronze medal – third place	2017 Cancún	–100 kg

Profile at external databases
- IJF: 9566
- JudoInside.com: 57546
- Updated on 25 November 2022

Philip Awiti-Alcaraz (born 13 August 1993) is a British judoka.

== Early life ==
Awiti-Alcaraz was born in Enfield, Greater London to a Kenyan father and a Mexican mother. His sister Prisca, brothers Joshua, Samy and Micheal, and cousins all joined Enfield Judo Club. On a scholarship, Awiti-Alcaraz pursued a Bachelor of Science in Sports Coaching Practice at the University of Wolverhampton.

== Judo career ==
Awiti-Alcaraz became champion of Great Britain, winning the half-heavyweight division at the British Judo Championships in 2015.

He won the bronze medal at the 2017 Judo Grand Prix Cancún in the -100 kg category.
