= Golf at the 2017 Summer Universiade – Men's team =

Men's team at the XXIX Summer Universiade
- Venue: Sunrise Golf and Country Club
- Dates: 24 August 2017 – 26 August 2017
- Competitors: 61 from 21 nations

Medalists
| 1st place, gold medalist(s) | | Kazuki Higa; Daiki Imano; Takumi Kanaya | Japan |
| 2nd place, silver medalist(s) | | Raúl Pereda de la Huerta; Álvaro Ortiz; Luis Gerardo Garza Morfin | Mexico |
| 3rd place, bronze medalist(s) | | Liu Yung-hua; Kevin Yu; Lai Chia-i | Chinese Taipei |

The men's team golf event at the 2017 Summer Universiade was held 24–26 August at the Sunrise Golf and Country Club in Taoyuan, Taiwan.

== Results ==
| Team | Round 1 | Round 2 | Round 3 | Total | Rank (individual) |
| Japan (JPN) | 133 | 132 | 141 | 406 | 1st place, gold medalist(s) |
|---|---|---|---|---|---|
| Kazuki Higa | 63 | 66 | ~~73~~ | 202 | 2 |
| Daiki Imano | 70 | 66 | 72 | 208 | T5 |
| Takumi Kanaya | ~~72~~ | ~~74~~ | 69 | 215 | T14 |
| Mexico (MEX) | 137 | 136 | 136 | 409 | 2nd place, silver medalist(s) |
| Raúl Pereda de la Huerta | 64 | 69 | 67 | 200 | 1 |
| Álvaro Ortiz | 73 | 67 | ~~71~~ | 211 | 9 |
| Luis Gerardo Garza Morfin | ~~79~~ | ~~70~~ | 69 | 218 | T21 |
| Chinese Taipei (TPE) | 136 | 136 | 142 | 414 | 3rd place, bronze medalist(s) |
| Liu Yung-hua | 69 | 67 | 71 | 207 | T3 |
| Kevin Yu | 67 | 69 | 71 | 207 | T3 |
| Lai Chia-i | ~~76~~ | ~~73~~ | ~~72~~ | 221 | T30 |
| Thailand (THA) | 140 | 146 | 137 | 423 | 4 |
| Tanapat Pichaikool | 69 | 69 | 70 | 208 | T5 |
| Varuth Khachonkittisakul | 71 | ~~80~~ | 67 | 218 | T21 |
| Sarun Sirithon | ~~73~~ | 77 | ~~73~~ | 223 | T36 |
| Switzerland (SUI) | 142 | 143 | 141 | 426 | T5 |
| Loris Schüpbach | 72 | 71 | 67 | 210 | 7 |
| Alessandro Nicc Noseda | 70 | ~~72~~ | 74 | 216 | T16 |
| Robert Harry Foley | ~~76~~ | 72 | RT | —N/a | |
| South Korea (KOR) | 141 | 147 | 138 | 426 | T5 |
| Kim Seong-hyeon | 71 | ~~75~~ | 67 | 213 | T10 |
| Choi Jae-hun | 70 | 73 | ~~73~~ | 216 | T16 |
| Oh Seung-taek | ~~73~~ | 74 | 71 | 218 | T21 |
| South Africa (RSA) | 146 | 142 | 140 | 428 | T7 |
| Kyle Raymond De Beer | 75 | 73 | 69 | 213 | T10 |
| Clayton Derick Mansfield | 71 | ~~79~~ | 71 | 221 | T30 |
| Dylan Lloyd Naidoo | ~~77~~ | 69 | ~~77~~ | 223 | T36 |
| France (FRA) | 143 | 147 | 138 | 428 | T7 |
| Franck Médale | 72 | 74 | 68 | 214 | T12 |
| Frédéric Lacroix | 71 | 73 | 70 | 214 | T12 |
| Hubert Dominique Tisserand | ~~77~~ | ~~75~~ | ~~71~~ | 223 | T36 |
| Hong Kong (HKG) | 145 | 146 | 140 | 431 | T9 |
| Matthew Cheung Hung Hai | 72 | 71 | 70 | 213 | T10 |
| Michael Wong Regan | 73 | ~~76~~ | ~~73~~ | 222 | T33 |
| Ng Shing Fung | ~~79~~ | 75 | 70 | 224 | T40 |
| Canada (CAN) | 144 | 146 | 141 | 431 | T9 |
| Austin Nolan Br Ryan | ~~74~~ | 72 | 71 | 217 | T18 |
| Eric Thomas Flockhart | 72 | 74 | ~~72~~ | 218 | T21 |
| Truman Kenneth Tai | 72 | ~~79~~ | 70 | 221 | T30 |
| Serbia (SRB) | 145 | 148 | 139 | 432 | 11 |
| Branimir-Ante Gudelj | 72 | 72 | 71 | 215 | T14 |
| Mihailo Dimitrijević | 73 | 76 | 68 | 217 | T18 |
| Sergej Stojiljković | ~~82~~ | ~~76~~ | ~~88~~ | 246 | T58 |
| Malaysia (MAS) | 142 | 149 | 146 | 437 | 12 |
| M. Afif Muhammad Razif | 66 | 72 | 72 | 210 | T7 |
| Sazanur Iman Salenin | ~~76~~ | 77 | 74 | 227 | 44 |
| Mohd Shakiran Johari | 76 | ~~86~~ | ~~75~~ | 237 | 52 |
| Philippines (PHI) | 147 | 148 | 148 | 443 | 13 |
| Jay Matthew Reyes | ~~76~~ | 72 | ~~76~~ | 224 | T40 |
| Ivan Monsalve | 73 | ~~79~~ | 73 | 225 | T42 |
| Jonas Christian Magcalayo | 74 | 76 | 75 | 225 | T42 |
| Italy (ITA) | 144 | 153 | 152 | 449 | 14 |
| Filippo Campigli | 69 | 75 | 74 | 218 | T21 |
| Giacomo Di Gennaro | ~~75~~ | ~~78~~ | 78 | 231 | T46 |
| Alessandro Cornelio | 75 | 78 | ~~81~~ | 234 | T50 |
| Argentina (ARG) | 150 | 153 | 147 | 450 | 15 |
| Miguel Sancholuz | 72 | 76 | 72 | 220 | 29 |
| Joaquin Luis de Aduriz | 78 | 77 | 75 | 230 | 45 |
| Juan Ignacio Ficco Villa | ~~81~~ | ~~83~~ | ~~80~~ | 244 | T56 |
| United States (USA) | 148 | 158 | 149 | 455 | 16 |
| Dylan Andrew Rottner | 73 | 77 | 72 | 222 | T36 |
| Matthew Thomas Andrews | 75 | 81 | 77 | 233 | T48 |
| Russia (RUS) | 156 | 148 | 157 | 461 | 17 |
| Samuel Perelzweig | 81 | 72 | 78 | 231 | T46 |
| David Nagiev | 75 | 76 | ~~82~~ | 233 | T48 |
| Georgy Chernov | ~~88~~ | ~~84~~ | 79 | 251 | 60 |
| Poland (POL) | 162 | 151 | 149 | 462 | 18 |
| Jan Jakub Szmidt | 78 | 70 | 70 | 218 | T21 |
| Artur Victor Dziugiel | 84 | 81 | 79 | 244 | T56 |
| Jan Kazimierz Szalagan | ~~91~~ | ~~83~~ | ~~98~~ | 272 | 65 |
| Liechtenstein (LIE) | 156 | 164 | 157 | 477 | 19 |
| Sebastian Lukas Schredt | 78 | ~~84~~ | 76 | 238 | 53 |
| Elias Engelbert Schreiber | 78 | 81 | ~~81~~ | 240 | 54 |
| Fabian Tobias Schredt | ~~90~~ | 83 | 81 | 254 | 61 |
| Hungary (HUN) | 163 | 159 | 166 | 488 | 20 |
| Marcell Soma Horvath | 82 | 78 | 82 | 242 | 55 |
| David Rozsa | 81 | 81 | 84 | 246 | T58 |
| Kazakhstan (KAZ) | 187 | 167 | 173 | 527 | 21 |
| Temirlan Kaidar | 93 | 78 | ~~93~~ | 264 | 63 |
| Nurtay Jaxaliyev | 94 | 89 | 87 | 270 | 64 |
| Issatay Jaxaliyev | ~~97~~ | ~~90~~ | 86 | 273 | 66 |
