= Kim Yeong-nam (diver) =

South Korean diver (born 1996)

Personal information
- Nationality: South Korean
- Born: 29 January 1996 (age 30) Seoul, South Korea

Sport
- Country: South Korea
- Sport: Diving
- Events: 3 m, 10 m synchro
- Partner: Woo Ha-ram
Medal record
Men's diving
Representing South Korea
Asian Games
Silver medal – second place	2014 Incheon	10 m synchro
Silver medal – second place	2018 Jakarta-Palembang	3 m synchro
Silver medal – second place	2018 Jakarta-Palembang	10 m synchro
Silver medal – second place	2022 Hangzhou	10 m synchro
Silver medal – second place	2026 Aichi–Nagoya	1 m springboard
Bronze medal – third place	2014 Incheon	3 m synchro
World University Games
Gold medal – first place	2017 Taipei	1 m springboard
Silver medal – second place	2015 Gwangju	10 m synchro
Silver medal – second place	2015 Gwangju	Mixed team
Silver medal – second place	2017 Taipei	Team
Silver medal – second place	2017 Taipei	3 m synchro
Silver medal – second place	2021 Chengdu	1 m springboard
Silver medal – second place	2021 Chengdu	Team
Bronze medal – third place	2015 Gwangju	Team
Bronze medal – third place	2017 Taipei	10 m platform
Bronze medal – third place	2017 Taipei	10 m synchro

Kim Yeong-nam (born 29 January 1996) is a South Korean diver. In 2021, he represented South Korea at the 2020 Summer Olympics in Tokyo, Japan.
