= Gabriele Auber =

Italian diver (born 1994)

Personal information
- Nationality: Italian
- Born: 20 February 1994 (age 32) Trieste
- Height: 1.78 m (5 ft 10 in)
- Weight: 74 kg (163 lb)

Sport
- Country: Italy
- Sport: Diving
Medal record
Universiade
Bronze medal – third place	2017 Taipei	3 m synchro
Bronze medal – third place	2017 Taipei	Mixed 3 m synchro
Bronze medal – third place	2019 Naples	1 m springboard

Gabriele Auber (born 20 February 1994) is an Italian diver who won a bronze medal at the 2019 Summer Universiade.

== Biography ==
Auber is an athlete of the Gruppo Sportivo della Marina Militare.

== See also ==
- Italy at the 2019 Summer Universiade
