= Melanie Bolaños =

Mexican judoka

Personal information
- Nationality: Mexican
- Born: 23 March 1994 (age 32)
- Occupation: Judoka

Sport
- Country: Mexico
- Sport: Judo
- Weight class: +78 kg

Achievements and titles
- Pan American Champ.: (2017)
Medal record
Women's judo
Representing Mexico
Pan American Championships
Silver medal – second place	2017 Panama City	+78 kg
IJF Grand Prix
Silver medal – second place	2017 Cancún	+78 kg

Profile at external databases
- IJF: 12745
- JudoInside.com: 44865
- Updated on 7 December 2022

Melanie Bolaños (born 23 March 1994) is a Mexican judoka.

She is the silver medallist of the 2017 Judo Grand Prix Cancún in the +78 kg category.
