= Anastasiia Nedobiga =

Ukrainian Olympic diver (born 1994)

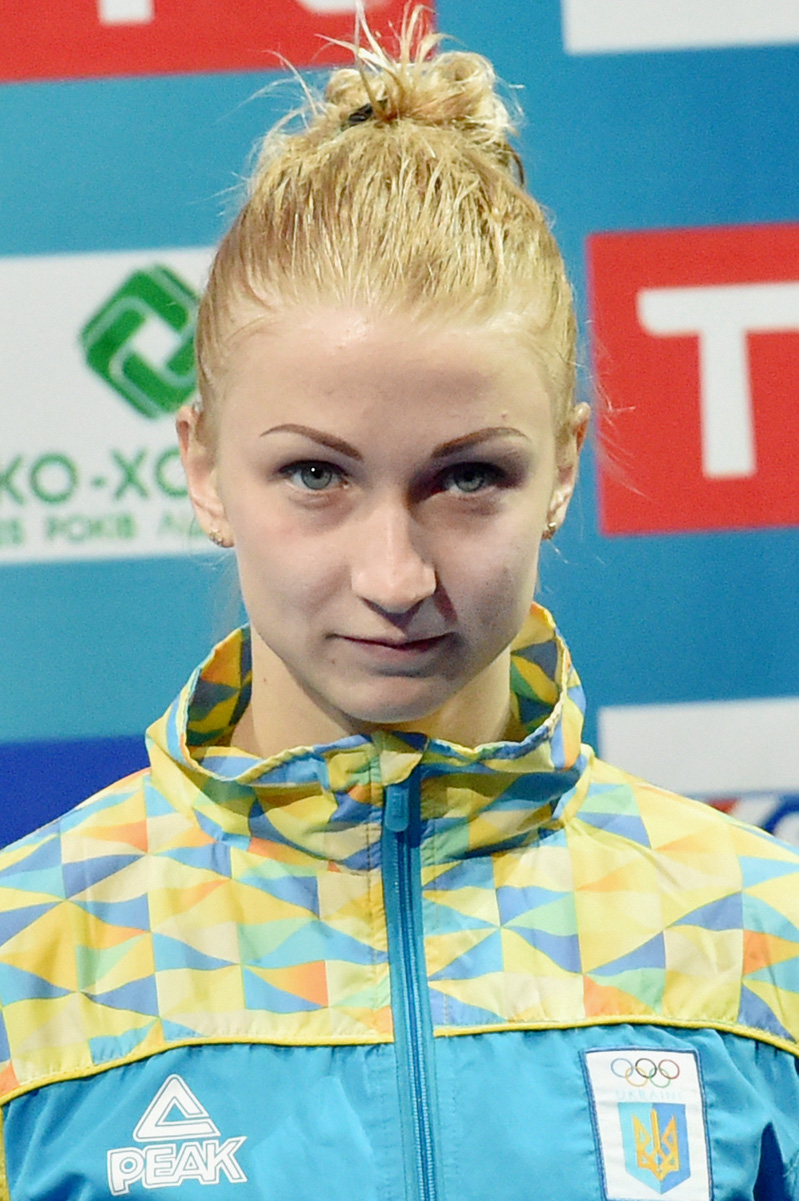
- Anastasiia Nedobiga at the 2017 European Diving Championships in Kyiv

Personal information
- Native name: Анастасія Володимирівна Недобіга
- Citizenship: Ukraine
- Born: 20 April 1994 (age 32) Luhansk, Ukraine

Sport
- Sport: Diving
Medal record
Women's diving
Representing Ukraine
European Diving Championships
Bronze medal – third place	2017 Kyiv	3m springboard
Summer Universiade
Gold medal – first place	2017 Taipei	Mixed team
European Junior Championships
Silver medal – second place	2009 Budapest	3m springboard
Bronze medal – third place	2012 Graz	3m synchro

Anastasiia Nedobiga (Ukrainian: Анастасія Володимирівна Недобіга, born April 20, 1994, in Luhansk) is a Ukrainian diver.

She finished 18th in the 3 metre springboard event of the 2016 Olympic Games. She won her first medal at 2017 European Diving Championships in home Kyiv.
