= Woo Ha-ram =

South Korean diver

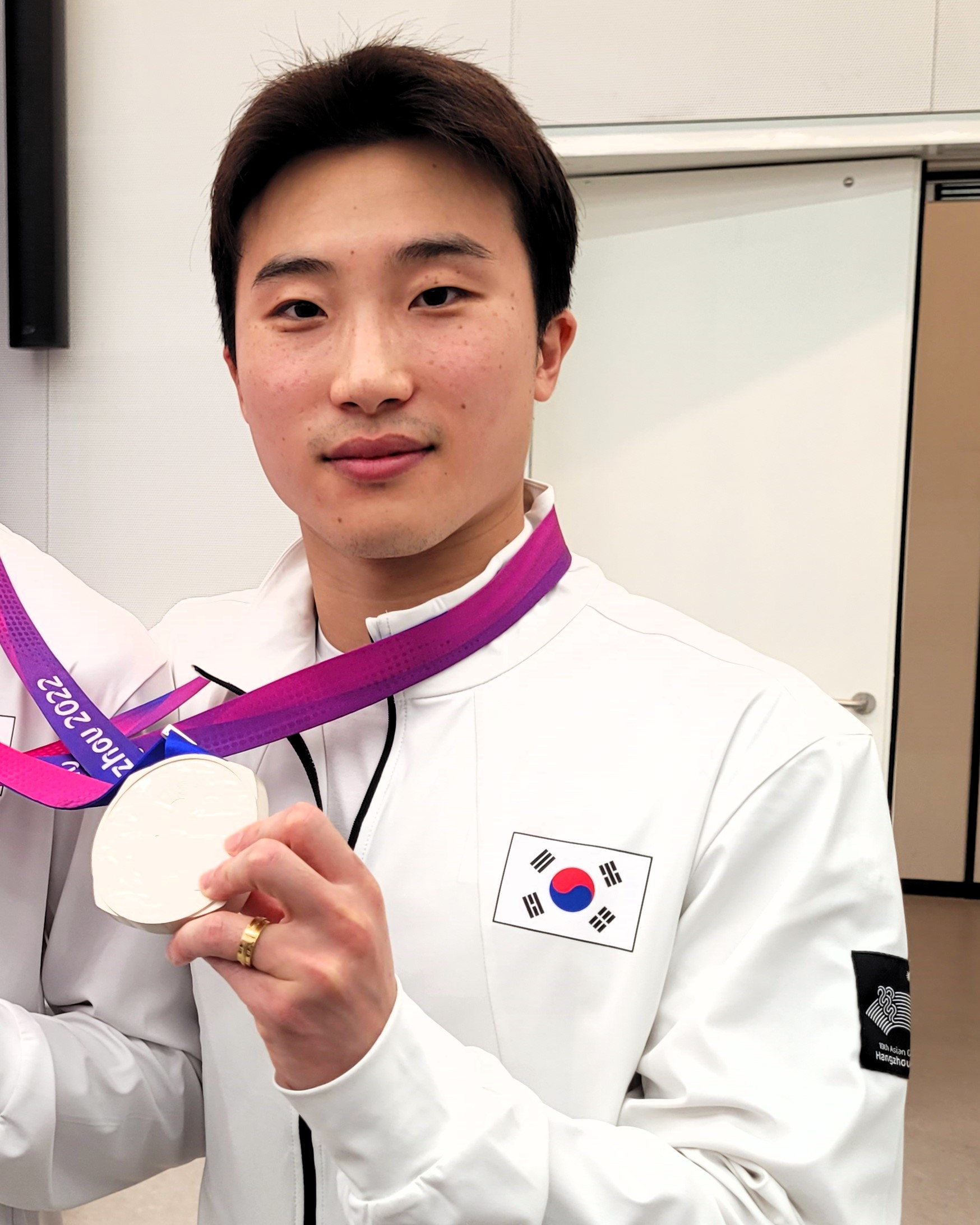
- Woo in 2022

Personal information
- Nationality: South Korean
- Born: 21 March 1998 (age 28) Busan, South Korea
- Height: 168 cm (5 ft 6 in)
- Weight: 58 kg (128 lb)

Sport
- Sport: Diving
- Events: 3 metre springboard 10 metre platform
- Club: Korea Sports Promotion Foundation
- Coached by: Hong Myung-ho (national)
Medal record
Men's diving
Representing South Korea
Asian Games
Silver medal – second place	2014 Incheon	10 m synchro
Silver medal – second place	2018 Jakarta-Palembang	3 m synchro
Silver medal – second place	2018 Jakarta-Palembang	10 m synchro
Silver medal – second place	2022 Hangzhou	3 m synchron
Bronze medal – third place	2014 Incheon	1 m springboard
Bronze medal – third place	2014 Incheon	10 m platform
Bronze medal – third place	2014 Incheon	3 m synchro
Bronze medal – third place	2018 Jakarta-Palembang	1 m springboard
Bronze medal – third place	2018 Jakarta-Palembang	10 m platform
Bronze medal – third place	2022 Hangzhou	1 m springboard
Summer Universiade
Silver medal – second place	2017 Taipei	3 m synchro
Silver medal – second place	2017 Taipei	Team
Bronze medal – third place	2017 Taipei	10 m synchro

Woo Ha-ram (Korean: 우하람, born 21 March 1998) is a South Korean diver. He competed in the men's 3 metre springboard and men's 10 metre platform at the 2016 Summer Olympics, where he finished 24th out of 29 competitors and 11th out of 28 competitors, respectively.

Woo qualified for the 2020 Summer Olympics in the men's 3 metre springboard and the men's 10 metre platform events. He finished fourth in the 3 metre event, the best ever finish by a South Korean diver at the Olympics.

== Early life ==
He took up the sport in the first grade of primary school in 2005.
