= Haruka Enomoto =

Japanese diver (born 1996)

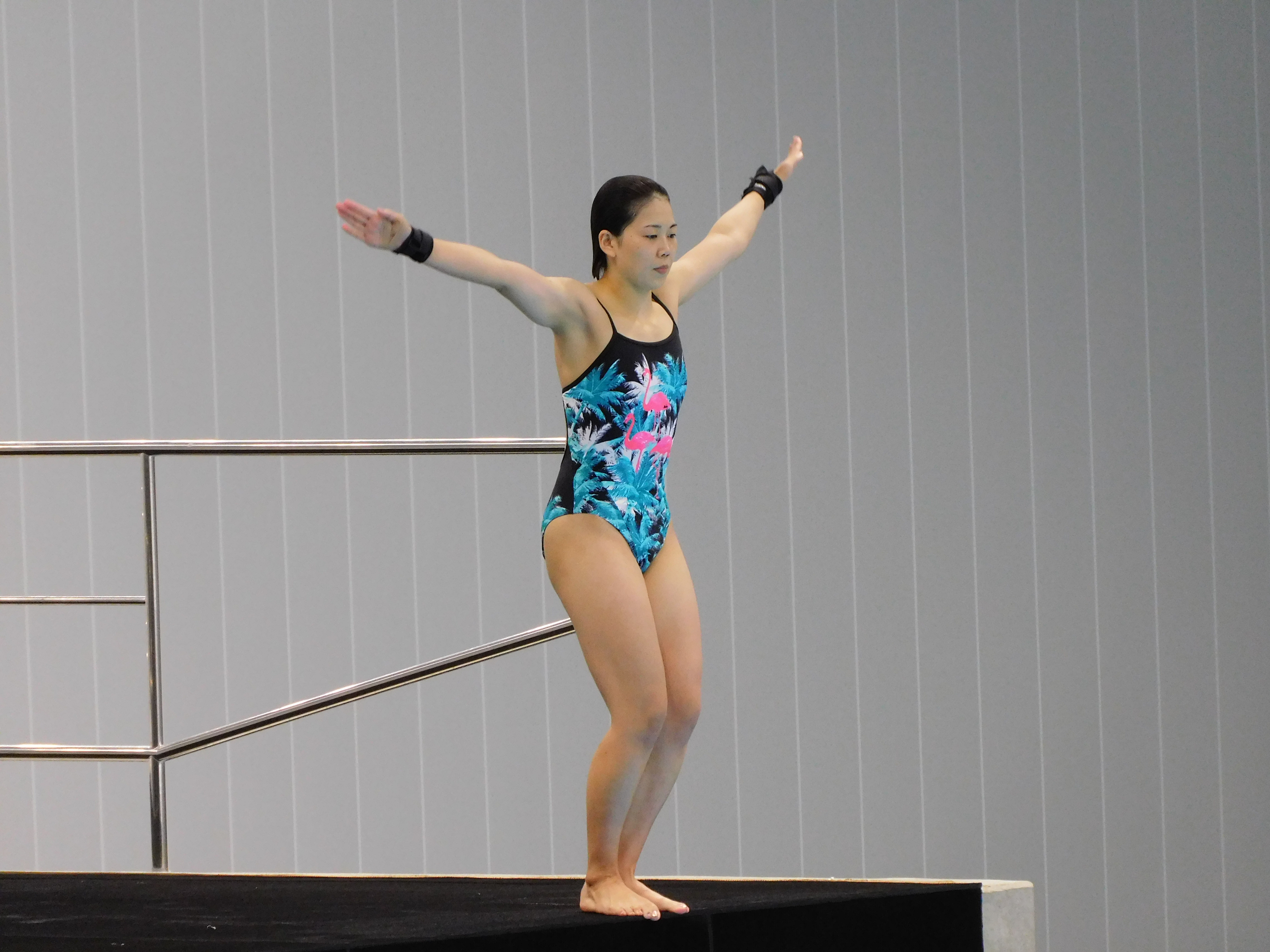

Personal information
- Full name: 榎本 遼香
- Nationality: Japanese
- Born: 14 September 1996 (age 30) Utsunomiya, Japan

Sport
- Sport: Diving

Haruka Enomoto (榎本遼香, Enomoto Haruka; born 14 September 1996) is a Japanese diver. She competed in the 2017 Summer Universiade, 2017 FINA Diving Grand Prix, and 2021 FINA Diving World Cup. She qualified to represent Japan at the 2020 Summer Olympics.
