= Armenia at the 2017 Summer Universiade =

Armenia's participation in the 2017 Summer Universiade

- IOC code: ARM
- NOC: Armenian Olympic Committee

in Taipei, Taiwan 19 – 30 August 2017
- Competitors: 16 in 7 sports
- Medals Ranked 26th: Gold 3 Silver 1 Bronze 2 Total 6

Summer Universiade appearances
- 1959; 1961; 1963; 1965; 1967; 1970; 1973; 1975; 1977; 1979; 1981; 1983; 1985; 1987; 1989; 1991; 1993; 1995; 1997; 1999; 2001; 2003; 2005; 2007; 2009; 2011; 2013; 2015; 2017; 2019; 2021; 2025; 2027

Armenia participated at the 2017 Summer Universiade in Taipei, Taiwan with 16 competitors in 7 sports.

== Diving ==
Athlete	Event	Preliminaries		Semifinals		Final	
Athlete	Event	Points	Rank	Points	Rank	Points	Rank
Azat Harutyunyan; Vladimir Harutyunyan	Synchronized 10m Platform	—N/a				358.74	6
Vladimir Harutyunyan	Men's Platform	408.30	8Q	408.30	16	Did not advance	

== Fencing ==
Athlete	Event	Round of 64	Round of 32	Round of 16	Quarterfinal	Semifinal	Final / BM	
Athlete	Event	Opposition Score	Opposition Score	Opposition Score	Opposition Score	Opposition Score	Opposition Score	Rank
Maykl Hovhannesyan	Men's Foil Individual	Bartosz Cegielski (POL); L 15–6	Did not advance					42

== Gymnastics ==
Athlete	Event	Apparatus						Total	Rank
Athlete	Event	F	PH	R	V	PB	HB	Total	Rank
Artur Davtyan	All-Around	13.300	14.050	14.950	14.750	13.900	13.200	84.150	5
Artur Davtyan	Pommel Horse	—N/a	14.533	—N/a				14.533	4
Artur Davtyan	Vault	—N/a			13.883	—N/a		13.883	7
Artur Tovmasyan	Rings	—N/a		15.025	—N/a			15.025	1st place, gold medalist(s)

== Judo ==
Athlete	Event	Round of 64	Round of 32	Round of 16	Quarterfinals	Repechage 32	Repechage 16	Repechage 8	Final Repechage	Semifinals	Final / BM	
Athlete	Event	Opposition Result	Opposition Result	Opposition Result	Opposition Result	Opposition Result	Opposition Result	Opposition Result	Opposition Result	Opposition Result	Opposition Result	Rank
Shahen Abaghyan	-60 kg	—N/a	Kim Chann-yeong (KOR); L 00–01S2	Did not advance		—N/a	Did not advance					N/A
Andranik Chaparyan	-81 kg	Ivan Petr (CZE); L 00S2–11S2	Bye			Steven Azar (LBN); W 10–00S1	Toraj Chenari (IRI); W 10S1–00S3	Wei-Cheng Chang (TPE); W 02S2–00	Vinicius Taranto Panini (BRA); L 00S1–01	Did Not Advance		7

== Taekwondo ==
Athlete	Event	Round of 64	Round of 32	Round of 16	Quarterfinals	Semifinals	Final / BM	
Athlete	Event	Opposition Result	Opposition Result	Opposition Result	Opposition Result	Opposition Result	Opposition Result	Rank
Arsen Grigoryan	Men's -87 kg	—N/a	Lutalo Mustafa Massop (GBR); L 14-24	Did Not Advance				17
Sergey Vardazaryan	Men's -68 kg	—N/a	Berkay Akyol (TUR); W 15-13	Ismael Yacouba Garba (IND); W 25-7	Nursultan Mamayev (KAZ); W 20-11	Aykhan Taghizade (AZE); L 14-31	Did Not Advance	3rd place, bronze medalist(s)

== Weightlifting ==
Athlete	Event	Snatch		Clean & Jerk		Total	Rank
Athlete	Event	Result	Rank	Result	Rank	Total	Rank
Andranik Karapetyan	85 kg	170	1	194	2	364	2nd place, silver medalist(s)
Simon Martirosyan	105 kg	180	1	221	1	401	1st place, gold medalist(s)
Gor Minasyan	+105 kg	200	1	230	1	430	1st place, gold medalist(s)

== Wushu ==
Athlete	Event	Preliminary	Quarterfinal	Semifinal	Final / BM	
Athlete	Event	Opposition Result	Opposition Result	Opposition Result	Opposition Result	Rank
Hayk Gasparyan	60 kg	(Macau) Kai Wa Kan; W 2-1	(China) Fuxiang Zhao; L 0-2	did not advance		
Karapet Tevosyan	70 kg	(South Korea) Jaehyeon Kim; W 2-0	(Belarus) Yauhen Sliaptsou; W 0-DNF	(Iran) Jafar Shirzadeh Topraghlo; L 0-2	Did Not Advance	3rd place, bronze medalist(s)
