= Melany Hernández =

Mexican diver (born 1998)

Personal information
- Full name: Melany Hernández Torres
- Nationality: Mexican
- Born: 26 July 1998 (age 27)
- Height: 1.65 m (5 ft 5 in)
- Weight: 60 kg (132 lb)

Sport
- Country: Mexico
- Sport: Diving
- Event: 3 m synchro
Medal record
World Championships
Bronze medal – third place	2019 Gwangju	3 m synchro

Melany Hernández Torres (born 26 July 1998) is a Mexican diver. She competed at the 2015 World Aquatics Championships in the women's synchronized 3 metre springboard, and at the 2016 Summer Olympics.

== See also ==
- Mexico at the 2015 World Aquatics Championships
