= Arantxa Chávez =

Mexican diver (born 1991)

Personal information
- Full name: Arantxa Elizabeth Chávez Muñoz
- Born: January 30, 1991 (age 35) Leon, Mexico
- Height: 160 cm (5 ft 3 in)

Sport
- Country: Mexico
- Events: 10m, 10m synchro
Medal record
Women's diving
Representing Mexico
Pan American Games
Silver medal – second place	2023 Santiago	3 m springboard
Gold medal – first place	2023 Santiago	3 m synchro
Universiade
Gold medal – first place	2017 Taipei	3 m springboard
Gold medal – first place	2017 Taipei	3 m synchro
Gold medal – first place	2017 Taipei	Mixed 3 m synchro
Bronze medal – third place	2013 Kazan	Team
Bronze medal – third place	2013 Kazan	3m springboard

Arantxa Elizabeth Chávez Muñoz (born 30 January 1991) is a Mexican diver. In 2012, she achieved qualification to participate at the 2012 Summer Olympics in the individual 3-metre trampoline event. At the Olympics, she failed to reach the semifinal and was classified 29th. In 2014, however, she was a gold winner, along with Dolores Hernández, in synchronized diving at the Central American Games of the Caribbean in 2014 in Veracruz.

After failing to qualify for the 2016 Summer Olympics, she considered retirement, before winning 3 medals at the 2017 World University Games. She qualified for the 2020 Summer Olympics. She did not advance to the semifinal and was classified 27th, the last of the field.

== Diving achievements ==
Competition	Event	2009	2010	2011	2012	2013	2014	2015	2016	2017	2018	2019	2020	2021	2022	2023	2024
International representing Mexico
Olympic Games	3m Springboard				29th				-					27th			-
FINA World Aquatics Championships	1m Springboard	20th		22nd		16th		19th		10th					19th		5th
FINA World Aquatics Championships	3m Springboard							18th		15th					17th		
FINA World Aquatics Championships	3m Synchro			9th		4th		7th		10th					8th	7th	7th
FINA World Aquatics Championships	3m Mixed Synchro									13th					4th		
FINA World Aquatics Championships	Mixed 3m & 10m Team							6th									
FINA Diving World Cup	3m Springboard		25th														
FINA Diving World Cup	3m Synchro		7th						10th								
Pan American Games	1m Springboard															4th	
Pan American Games	3m Springboard							4th								2nd place, silver medalist(s)	
Pan American Games	3m Springboard Synchro															1st place, gold medalist(s)	
World University Games	1m Springboard					6th				5th							
World University Games	3m Springboard					3rd place, bronze medalist(s)				1st place, gold medalist(s)							
World University Games	3m Synchro					5th				1st place, gold medalist(s)							
World University Games	3m Mixed Synchro									1st place, gold medalist(s)							
