= North Korea at the 2017 Summer Universiade =

- IOC code: PRK
- NOC: Olympic Committee of the Democratic People's Republic of Korea
- Website: www.olympic.org/democratic-people-s-republic-of-korea

in Taipei, Taiwan 19 – 30 July 2017
- Competitors: 31 in 4 sports
- Medals Ranked 7th: Gold 12 Silver 5 Bronze 6 Total 23

Summer Universiade appearances
- 1959; 1961; 1963; 1965; 1967; 1970; 1973; 1975; 1977; 1979; 1981; 1983; 1985; 1987; 1989; 1991; 1993; 1995; 1997; 1999; 2001; 2003; 2005; 2007; 2009; 2011; 2013; 2015; 2017; 2019; 2021; 2025; 2027

North Korea participated at the 2017 Summer Universiade, in Taipei, Taiwan.

== Medal summary ==
=== Medal by sports ===
Medals by sport
Sport	1st place, gold medalist(s)	2nd place, silver medalist(s)	3rd place, bronze medalist(s)	Total
Diving	5	3	0	8
Gymnastics Artistic	0	0	1	1
Table tennis	0	1	3	4
Weightlifting	7	1	2	10
Total	12	5	6	23
