= Germany at the 2017 Summer Universiade =

- IOC code: GER
- NOC: Deutscher Olympischer Sportbund
- Website: www.dosb.de (in German)

in Taipei, Taiwan 19 – 30 August 2017
- Competitors: 126 in 14 sports
- Medals Ranked 12th: Gold 7 Silver 6 Bronze 11 Total 24

Summer Universiade appearances
- 1959; 1961; 1963; 1965; 1967; 1970; 1973; 1975; 1977; 1979; 1981; 1983; 1985; 1987; 1989; 1991; 1993; 1995; 1997; 1999; 2001; 2003; 2005; 2007; 2009; 2011; 2013; 2015; 2017; 2019; 2021; 2025; 2027

Germany participated at the 2017 Summer Universiade, in Taipei, Taiwan.

== Medal summary ==
=== Medal by sports ===
Medals by sport
Sport	1st place, gold medalist(s)	2nd place, silver medalist(s)	3rd place, bronze medalist(s)	Total
Athletics	5	2	1	8
Diving	0	0	2	2
Gymnastics Artistic	0	1	0	1
Judo	0	0	5	5
Swimming	2	3	1	6
Taekwondo	0	0	2	2
Total	7	6	11	24
