= Archery at the 2017 Summer Universiade – Men's individual recurve =

Men's individual recurve at the XXIX Summer Universiade
- Venues: National Taiwan Sport University Stadium
- Dates: August 20, 2017 – August 24, 2017
- Competitors: 73 from 32 nations

Medalists
1st place, gold medalist(s)		Lee Seung-yun	South Korea
2nd place, silver medalist(s)		Arsalan Baldanov	Russia
3rd place, bronze medalist(s)		Kim Woo-jin	South Korea

The men's individual recurve archery competition at the 2017 Summer Universiade was held in the National Taiwan Sport University Stadium, Taipei, Taiwan between August 20 and 21, 2017, and the finals on August 24.

== Records ==
Prior to the competition, the world and Universiade records were as follows.

- 72 arrows ranking round

Category	Athlete	Record	Date	Place	Event
World record	(South Korea) Kim Woo-jin	700	5 August 2016	Rio de Janeiro, Brazil	2016 Summer Olympics
Universiade record	(South Korea) Lee Seung-yun	693	4 July 2015	Gwangju, South Korea	2015 Summer Universiade

== Ranking round ==
Qualified for Round of 32
Qualified for 1/24 Round
Qualified for 1/48 Round

The ranking round took place on 20 August 2017 to determine the seeding for the elimination rounds. It consisted of two rounds of 36 arrows, with a maximum score of 720.

Rank	Archer	1st Half	2nd Half	10s	Xs	Score	Notes
1	Lee Seung-yun (KOR)	343	346	43	18	689	
2	Kim Woo-jin (KOR)	343	344	40	16	687	
3	Lee Woo-seok (KOR)	336	337	32	14	673	
4	Banda Árpád (HUN)	334	337	31	8	671	
5	Wei Chun-heng (TPE)	331	334	37	10	665	
6	Arsalan Baldanov (RUS)	340	325	30	9	665	
7	Wataru Oonuki (JPN)	331	332	28	4	663	
8	Deng Yu-cheng (TPE)	329	333	28	9	662	
9	Masaya Yamamoto (JPN)	328	333	26	4	661	
10	Oleksii Hunbin (UKR)	324	336	26	8	660	
11	Heorhiy Ivanytskyy (UKR)	325	335	25	9	660	
12	Sultan Duzelbayev (KAZ)	327	332	30	10	659	
13	Dan Olaru (MDA)	328	331	26	10	659	
14	Artem Makhnenko (RUS)	325	332	30	11	657	
15	Kacper Pawel Sierakowski (POL)	332	325	24	8	657	
16	Thomas Howard Hall (GBR)	325	331	30	9	656	
17	Massimiliano Mandia (ITA)	322	334	28	11	656	
18	Peng Shih-cheng (TPE)	323	332	27	8	655	
19	Maximilian Pete Weckmueller (GER)	327	327	24	9	654	
20	Jorge Ociel Nevárez Cárdenas (MEX)	323	330	26	11	653	
21	Galsan Bazarzhapov (RUS)	320	333	24	9	653	
22	Pravin Ramesh Jadhav (IND)	327	325	22	6	652	
23	Denis Gankin (KAZ)	324	327	26	12	651	
24	Luis Álvarez (MEX)	326	325	23	6	651	
25	Mathieu Rene Er. Jimenez (FRA)	321	330	22	7	651	
26	Antti Olavi Vikström (FIN)	322	327	25	3	649	
27	Kazuki Ohi (JPN)	317	332	21	5	649	
28	Sanzhar Mussayev (KAZ)	326	321	24	6	647	
29	Kamal Sagar (IND)	320	323	20	3	643	
30	Florian Faber (SUI)	319	323	18	5	642	
31	Teo Sion Wei Xiang (SGP)	316	325	22	6	641	
32	Oldair Zamora Lira (MEX)	318	323	20	3	641	
33	Thomas Gino Mic Chirault (FRA)	321	318	21	6	639	
34	Matthew Joseph Zumbo (USA)	317	322	20	6	639	
35	Eric Skoeries (GER)	319	320	18	4	639	
36	Chan Jor Shing (HKG)	318	319	18	5	637	
37	Johannes Maier (GER)	319	315	18	11	634	
38	Guy Matzkin (ISR)	316	318	17	5	634	
39	Thomas Alfred P Koenig (FRA)	318	315	19	6	633	
40	Inderjeet Verma (IND)	320	313	16	3	633	
41	Ashe-wynter Yio Morgan (GBR)	314	317	28	5	631	
42	Dhia Rahmat (INA)	309	322	20	7	631	
43	Matteo Paoletta (ITA)	313	318	19	4	631	
44	Gašper Štrajhar (SLO)	313	317	20	3	630	
45	Maert Oona (EST)	313	315	23	6	628	
46	Atiq Bazil Bakri (MAS)	308	320	22	7	628	
47	Muhamad Fareez Rosli (MAS)	309	319	19	4	628	
48	Rok Bizjak (SLO)	314	312	14	7	626	
49	Den Habjan Malavasic (SLO)	321	304	20	3	625	
50	Dillon Fitzgera McMenamy (USA)	314	311	18	8	625	
51	Teo Kee Hui Keith (SGP)	307	317	16	6	624	
52	Vladimir Hurban (SVK)	306	315	20	7	621	
53	Pearu Jakob Ojamäe (EST)	310	307	17	4	617	
54	Adam Jurzak (POL)	305	311	18	4	616	
55	Nazir Omar (MAS)	308	306	13	3	614	
56	Mykhailo Kostash (UKR)	311	302	13	1	613	
57	David Matthew Wolfe (USA)	310	302	19	5	612	
58	Eero Risto Yrja Maeenpaeae (FIN)	296	311	14	5	607	
59	Michal Hlahůlek (CZE)	305	299	18	7	604	
60	Jaako Kalevi Hepola (FIN)	309	295	16	6	604	
61	Vít Vejražka (CZE)	305	298	12	5	603	
62	Maciej Jarosław Fałdziński (POL)	305	297	12	3	602	
63	Marvin John Grischke (LIE)	306	296	11	5	602	
64	Mikael Alexande Danielsson (SWE)	298	300	9	1	598	
65	Jack Alex Masefield (GBR)	297	299	8	2	596	
66	Paolo Caruso (ITA)	299	295	10	4	594	
67	David Jaroch (CZE)	304	288	7	0	592	
68	Bjoernar Saurdal (NOR)	293	277	8	2	570	
69	Jayson Mendoza (PHI)	263	271	4	0	534	
70	Ho Alfred Wai Keon (SGP)	254	261	8	0	515	
71	Janus Ventura (PHI)	240	265	8	0	505	
72	Jules Ecuan (PHI)	233	226	3	0	459	
	Ali Hamad Kadhi Kadhim (IRQ)					DNS	

== Elimination round ==
=== Section 1 ===
1/48 Round
1	Lee Seung-yun (KOR)
Bye
33	Thomas Gino Mic Chirault (FRA)
Bye
Bye
32	Oldair Zamora Lira (MEX)
17	Massimiliano Mandia (ITA)
Bye
65	Jack Alex Masefield (GBR)	2	25	26	25	24
48	Rok Bizjak (SLO)	6	25	26	28	27
49	Den Habjan Malavasic (SLO)	6	28	27	28
64	Mikael Alexande Danielsson (SWE)	0	26	22	25
Bye
16	Thomas Howard Hall (GBR)

1/24 Round
1	Lee Seung-yun (KOR)
Bye
33	Thomas Gino Mic Chirault (FRA)	5	28	25	23	27	25-9
32	Oldair Zamora Lira (MEX)	6	25	23	26	28	25-10
17	Massimiliano Mandia (ITA)	6	27	27	27	27	27-10
48	Rok Bizjak (SLO)	5	26	27	24	29	28-7
49	Den Habjan Malavasic (SLO)	6	26	28	28	28	24-10
16	Thomas Howard Hall (GBR)	5	30	26	26	28	27-8

Round of 32
1	Lee Seung-yun (KOR)	6	30	28	29
32	Oldair Zamora Lira (MEX)	0	23	26	25
17	Massimiliano Mandia (ITA)	6	27	25	28	27	25-10
49	Den Habjan Malavasic (SLO)	5	24	28	25	28	25-8

Round of 16
1	Lee Seung-yun (KOR)	6	27	30	30	27	27
17	Massimiliano Mandia (ITA)	4	28	28	27	28	26

=== Section 2 ===
1/48 Round
9	Masaya Yamamoto (JPN)
Bye
57	David Matthew Wolfe (USA)	6	23	24	26	26	28-8
56	Mykhailo Kostash (UKR)	5	27	27	26	23	23-7
41	Ashe-wynter Yio Morgan (GBR)	6	29	28	25
72	Jules Ecuan (PHI)	0	16	19	19
Bye
24	Luis Álvarez (MEX)
25	Mathieu Rene Er. Jimenez (FRA)
Bye
Bye
40	Inderjeet Verma (IND)
Bye
8	Deng Yu-cheng (TPE)

1/24 Round
9	Masaya Yamamoto (JPN)	4	22	27	28	28	26
57	David Matthew Wolfe (USA)	6	25	27	28	27	27
41	Ashe-wynter Yio Morgan (GBR)	5	26	27	26	29	26-8
24	Luis Álvarez (MEX)	6	23	27	28	27	27-9
25	Mathieu Rene Er. Jimenez (FRA)	6	27	27	27
40	Inderjeet Verma (IND)	0	25	25	24
Bye
8	Deng Yu-cheng (TPE)

Round of 32
57	David Matthew Wolfe (USA)	2	26	29	25	21
24	Luis Álvarez (MEX)	6	29	24	26	24
25	Mathieu Rene Er. Jimenez (FRA)	6	25	28	25	26	25
8	Deng Yu-cheng (TPE)	4	27	27	27	22	24

Round of 16
24	Luis Álvarez (MEX)	3	25	28	27	26	21
25	Mathieu Rene Er. Jimenez (FRA)	7	26	29	27	25	27

=== Section 3 ===
1/48 Round
5	Wei Chun-heng (TPE)
Bye
37	Johannes Maier (GER)
Bye
Bye
28	Sanzhar Mussayev (KAZ)
21	Galsan Bazarzhapov (RUS)
Bye
69	Jayson Mendoza (PHI)	0	21	22	24
44	Gašper Štrajhar (SLO)	6	28	27	27
53	Pearu Jakob Ojamäe (EST)	6	26	24	29
60	Jaako Kalevi Hepola (FIN)	0	25	23	21
Bye
12	Sultan Duzelbayev (KAZ)

1/24 Round
5	Wei Chun-heng (TPE)
Bye
37	Johannes Maier (GER)	4	28	25	26	30	27
28	Sanzhar Mussayev (KAZ)	6	25	27	27	28	28
21	Galsan Bazarzhapov (RUS)	7	27	30	26	28	28
44	Gašper Štrajhar (SLO)	3	26	25	27	28	26
53	Pearu Jakob Ojamäe (EST)	2	26	19	24	22
12	Sultan Duzelbayev (KAZ)	6	25	26	29	23

Round of 32
5	Wei Chun-heng (TPE)	7	27	27	27	26	28
28	Sanzhar Mussayev (KAZ)	3	25	27	28	25	27
21	Galsan Bazarzhapov (RUS)	3	27	26	25	27	24
12	Sultan Duzelbayev (KAZ)	7	30	28	25	23	28

Round of 16
5	Wei Chun-heng (TPE)	3	27	29	26	27	26
12	Sultan Duzelbayev (KAZ)	7	27	29	28	27	27

=== Section 4 ===
1/48 Round
13	Dan Olaru (MDA)
Bye
61	Vít Vejražka (CZE)	2	20	27	23	25
52	Vladimir Hurban (SVK)	6	29	24	29	26
45	Maert Oona (EST)	6	28	29	25	29
68	Bjoernar Saurdal (NOR)	2	23	25	28	22
Bye
20	Jorge Ociel Nevárez Cárdenas (MEX)
29	Kamal Sagar (IND)
Bye
Bye
36	Chan Jor Shing (HKG)
Bye
4	Banda Árpád (HUN)

1/24 Round
13	Dan Olaru (MDA)	6	28	29	27
52	Vladimir Hurban (SVK)	0	26	27	26
45	Maert Oona (EST)	6	25	26	26	29	27-10
20	Jorge Ociel Nevárez Cárdenas (MEX)	5	25	27	25	27	29-9
29	Kamal Sagar (IND)	6	30	24	28	28
36	Chan Jor Shing (HKG)	2	27	27	24	27
Bye
4	Banda Árpád (HUN)

Round of 32
13	Dan Olaru (MDA)	7	26	28	24	28
45	Maert Oona (EST)	1	23	25	24	21
29	Kamal Sagar (IND)	3	28	25	27	27	22
4	Banda Árpád (HUN)	7	28	27	29	22	25

Round of 16
13	Dan Olaru (MDA)	2	27	26	27	24
4	Banda Árpád (HUN)	6	28	27	23	25

=== Section 5 ===
1/48 Round
3	Lee Woo-seok (KOR)
Bye
35	Eric Skoeries (GER)
Bye
Bye
30	Florian Faber (SUI)
19	Maximilian Pete Weckmueller (GER)
Bye
67	David Jaroch (CZE)	3	27	24	24	25	25
46	Atiq Bazil Bakri (MAS)	7	28	28	24	24	26
51	Teo Kee Hui Keith (SGP)	4	27	26	26	24	23
62	Maciej Jarosław Fałdziński (POL)	6	26	26	27	28	29
Bye
14	Artem Makhnenko (RUS)

1/24 Round
3	Lee Woo-seok (KOR)
Bye
35	Eric Skoeries (GER)	3	25	25	27	27	25
30	Florian Faber (SUI)	7	25	28	26	28	29
19	Maximilian Pete Weckmueller (GER)	6	29	29	29
46	Atiq Bazil Bakri (MAS)	0	28	28	24
62	Maciej Jarosław Fałdziński (POL)	3	26	28	16	27	26
14	Artem Makhnenko (RUS)	7	28	26	29	27	27

Round of 32
3	Lee Woo-seok (KOR)	6	27	29	29
30	Florian Faber (SUI)	0	26	28	26
19	Maximilian Pete Weckmueller (GER)	6	29	29	26	21	24
14	Artem Makhnenko (RUS)	4	28	27	27	27	23

Round of 16
3	Lee Woo-seok (KOR)	3	28	27	26	26	23
19	Maximilian Pete Weckmueller (GER)	7	30	27	25	29	25

=== Section 6 ===
1/48 Round
11	Heorhiy Ivanytskyy (UKR)
Bye
59	Michal Hlahůlek (CZE)	6	26	24	28	26	27
54	Adam Jurzak (POL)	4	27	25	24	25	20
43	Matteo Paoletta (ITA)	6	27	25	26
70	Ho Alfred Wai Keon (SGP)	0	18	14	25
Bye
22	Pravin Ramesh Jadhav (IND)
27	Kazuki Ohi (JPN)
Bye
Bye
38	Guy Matzkin (ISR)
Bye
6	Arsalan Baldanov (RUS)

1/24 Round
11	Heorhiy Ivanytskyy (UKR)	6	28	28	27
59	Michal Hlahůlek (CZE)	0	24	24	23
43	Matteo Paoletta (ITA)	1	26	27	27	24
22	Pravin Ramesh Jadhav (IND)	7	29	27	29	25
27	Kazuki Ohi (JPN)	7	26	29	29	27	29
38	Guy Matzkin (ISR)	3	28	27	26	27	25
Bye
6	Arsalan Baldanov (RUS)

Round of 32
11	Heorhiy Ivanytskyy (UKR)	6	28	27	26	27
22	Pravin Ramesh Jadhav (IND)	2	26	25	27	23
27	Kazuki Ohi (JPN)	0	26	26	28
6	Arsalan Baldanov (RUS)	6	28	28	29

Round of 16
11	Heorhiy Ivanytskyy (UKR)	4	29	25	27	25	26
6	Arsalan Baldanov (RUS)	6	25	27	27	25	27

=== Section 7 ===
1/48 Round
7	Wataru Oonuki (JPN)
Bye
39	Thomas Alfred P Koenig (FRA)
Bye
Bye
26	Antti Olavi Vikström (FIN)
23	Denis Gankin (KAZ)
Bye
71	Janus Ventura (PHI)	2	25	25	17	24
42	Dhia Rahmat (INA)	24	28	24	28
55	Nazir Omar (MAS)	20	27	29	26	24
58	Eero Risto Yrja Maeenpaeae (FIN)	4	19	27	26	28	24
Bye
10	Oleksii Hunbin (UKR)

1/24 Round
7	Wataru Oonuki (JPN)
Bye
39	Thomas Alfred P Koenig (FRA)	7	28	25	27	28	28
26	Antti Olavi Vikström (FIN)	3	28	27	26	25	27
23	Denis Gankin (KAZ)	6	27	26	24	28	28
42	Dhia Rahmat (INA)	4	26	28	22	30	26
55	Nazir Omar (MAS)	0	25	27	24
10	Oleksii Hunbin (UKR)	6	27	28	28

Round of 32
7	Wataru Oonuki (JPN)	6	26	28	27	28
39	Thomas Alfred P Koenig (FRA)	2	28	26	26	22
23	Denis Gankin (KAZ)	0	27	24	27
10	Oleksii Hunbin (UKR)	6	28	26	28

Round of 16
7	Wataru Oonuki (JPN)	2	28	27	26	28
10	Oleksii Hunbin (UKR)	6	27	29	27	29

=== Section 8 ===
1/48 Round
15	Kacper Pawel Sierakowski (POL)
Bye
63	Marvin John Grischke (LIE)	1	26	24	22	26
50	Dillon Fitzgera McMenamy (USA)	7	26	28	24	27
47	Muhamad Fareez Rosli (MAS)	6	27	30	28	27
66	Paolo Caruso (ITA)	2	27	25	26	27
Bye
18	Peng Shih-cheng (TPE)
31	Teo Sion Wei Xiang (SGP)
Bye
Bye
34	Matthew Joseph Zumbo (USA)
Bye
2	Kim Woo-jin (KOR)

1/24 Round
15	Kacper Pawel Sierakowski (POL)	6	29	29	30
50	Dillon Fitzgera McMenamy (USA)	0	27	28	28
47	Muhamad Fareez Rosli (MAS)	6	26	29	27	28	26
18	Peng Shih-cheng (TPE)	4	26	25	28	26	26
31	Teo Sion Wei Xiang (SGP)	0	27	25	25
34	Matthew Joseph Zumbo (USA)	6	28	27	28
Bye
2	Kim Woo-jin (KOR)

Round of 32
15	Kacper Pawel Sierakowski (POL)	6	25	29	27	29
47	Muhamad Fareez Rosli (MAS)	2	27	27	26	21
34	Matthew Joseph Zumbo (USA)	2	29	26	26	25
2	Kim Woo-jin (KOR)	6	25	27	27	26

Round of 16
15	Kacper Pawel Sierakowski (POL)	4	30	27	27	26	27
2	Kim Woo-jin (KOR)	6	26	29	28	26	27

=== Quarterfinals ===
Quarterfinals
1	Lee Seung-yun (KOR)	7	29	29	28	28	29
25	Mathieu Rene Er. Jimenez (FRA)	3	28	26	29	28	27
12	Sultan Duzelbayev (KAZ)	2	28	28	24	23
4	Banda Árpád (HUN)	6	29	26	26	25
19	Maximilian Pete Weckmueller (GER)	3	28	28	27	24	24
6	Arsalan Baldanov (RUS)	7	29	28	23	27	27
10	Oleksii Hunbin (UKR)	0	28	28	25
2	Kim Woo-jin (KOR)	6	30	30	30

Semifinals
1	Lee Seung-yun (KOR)	6	28	30	30
4	Banda Árpád (HUN)	0	24	25	25
6	Arsalan Baldanov (RUS)	6	29	28	29	28
2	Kim Woo-jin (KOR)	2	28	28	27	28

Final
1	Lee Seung-yun (KOR)	6	27	30	30
6	Arsalan Baldanov (RUS)	0	26	26	28
Bronze Medal
4	Banda Árpád (HUN)	0	27	26	27
2	Kim Woo-jin (KOR)	6	28	28	28
