= Philippines at the FISU World University Games =

- IOC code: PHI
- National federation: Federation of School Sports Association of the Philippines
- Website: www.fessap.net
- Medals Ranked 72nd: Gold 2 Silver 3 Bronze 1 Total 6

Summer appearances
- 1967; 1970–1985; 2003; 2005; 2007; 2009; 2011; 2013; 2015; 2017; 2019; 2021; 2025

Winter appearances
- 2019; 2023; 2025

The Philippines has participated at the FISU World University Games, formerly known as the Universiade until 2019. It debuted at the 1967 Summer Universiade. From 1967 until 2007, athletes representing the country were sent by the University Athletic Association of the Philippines with sanction from Philippine Olympic Committee. Since 2011 it is the Federation of School Sports Association of the Philippines (FESSAP), a member of the International University Sports Federation (FISU), that has been sending competitors representing the country at the Universiade.

== History ==
The Philippines first participated in the Universiade at the 1967 Summer Universiade in Tokyo. From 1967 until 2007, the University Athletic Association of the Philippines sent athletes to the Universiade under the directive of the Philippine Olympic Committee.

From the 2011 edition, the Philippine delegation has been sanctioned and sent by the Federation of School Sports Association of the Philippines which was granted membership by the International University Sports Federation (FISU) in 2009. The UAAP attempted to gain membership at the FISU and replace FESSAP as the Philippines' member organization in the international sports body, but FISU affirmed the membership of FESSAP in 2013.

The Philippines won its first gold medal at the 2013 Summer Universiade courtesy of Wesley So of chess.

The country made its debut in the Winter Universiade in the 2019 edition held in Krasnoyarsk, Russia. The Philippines competed in figure skating with Misha Fabian as the national delegation's sole competitor.

== Team sports ==
The Philippines has sent athletes to compete in team sports such as basketball and volleyball. These teams are not necessarily organized or sanctioned by member associations of the Philippine Olympic Committee.

Basketball

The Philippines' last participation in the Universiade in the 20th century was in 1967 Summer Universiade when the UE Red Warriors of the University of the East played as the country's Universiade basketball team. The UE team was led by Robert Jaworski and Danny Florencio. The team placed fifth out of eight teams in the final standing.

The Philippine Olympic Committee and the Samahang Basketbol ng Pilipinas attempted to send a men's basketball team to the 2009 Summer Universiade. Their application to FISU was denied, saying to the POC that they are prioritizing participation of its member associations for the 24-team men's basketball event. 2008 Philippine Collegiate Champion League winners, the De La Salle Green Archers of the De La Salle University, would have represented the country.

The first basketball team sent by the Federation of School Sports Association of the Philippines as the Philippines' representatives were the University of the Visayas Lancers, who played in the 2013 edition. This team was led by head coach Felix Bellano Jr. However, the team was disqualified after they left the tournament before the quarterfinals.

The Mapúa Cardinals represented the Philippines at the 2025 Summer World University Games after qualifying via the Philippine University Basketball League. They finished fourteenth.

Volleyball

When the Philippines debuted at the 1967 Summer Universiade, they fielded volleyball teams for both the men's and women's competition. The men's team finished fourth while the women's team clinched second place.

The NU Bulldogs represented the Philippines in men's volleyball at the 2025 Summer World University Games after qualifying via the Philippine University Volleyball League. They finished fourteenth.

== Medal count ==
=== Medals by Summer World University Games ===
Games	Athletes	Gold	Silver	Bronze	Total	Rank
(Italy) Torino 1959	Did not participate					
(Bulgaria) Sofia 1961	Did not participate					
(Brazil) Porto Alegre 1963	Did not participate					
(Hungary) Budapest 1965	Did not participate					
(Japan) Tokyo 1967	-	0	1	0	1	No Info
(Italy) Torino 1970	Did not participate					
(Soviet Union) Moscow 1973	Did not participate					
(Italy) Rome 1975	Did not participate					
(Bulgaria) Sofia 1977	Did not participate					
Mexico City 1979	Did not participate					
(Romania) Bucharest 1981	Did not participate					
(Canada) Edmonton 1983	Did not participate					
(Japan) Kobe 1985	Did not participate					
(South Korea) Daegu 2003	0	0	0	0	0	-
(Turkey) Izmir 2005	Did not participate					
(Thailand) Bangkok 2007	-	0	0	1	1	63
(Serbia) Belgrade 2009	Did not participate					
(China) Shenzhen 2011	58	0	1	0	1	50
(Russia) Kazan 2013	89	1	0	0	1	41
(South Korea) Gwangju 2015	78	0	0	0	0	0
(Chinese Taipei) Taipei 2017	116	0	1	0	1	54
(Italy) Naples 2019	-	1	0	0	1	40
(China) Chengdu 2021	34	0	0	0	0	-
(Russia) Yekaterinburg 2023	Cancelled					
(Germany) Rhine-Ruhr 2025	34	0	0	0	0	-
Total	-	2	3	1	6	76

=== Medals by sport ===
Sport	Gold	Silver	Bronze	Total
Athletics	1	0	0	1
Chess	1	0	0	1
Taekwondo	0	1	1	2
Volleyball	0	1	0	1
Wushu	0	1	0	1
Totals (5 entries)	2	3	1	6

=== Medals at the Winter World University Games ===
Games	Athletes	Gold	Silver	Bronze	Total	Rank
1960–2017	Did not participate					
(Russia) 2019 Krasnoyarsk	1	0	0	0	0	-
(United States) 2023 Lake Placid	4	0	0	0	0	-
(Italy) 2025 Turin	1	0	0	0	0	-
Total	-	0	0	0	0	-

== List of medalists ==
Medal	Athlete	Year	Sport	Event
Silver	Philippine Universiade volleyball team	1967	Volleyball	Women's
Bronze	Maria Criselda Roxas	2007	Taekwondo	Women's 72 kg
Silver	Samuel Morrison	2011	Taekwondo	Men's 63 kg
Gold	Wesley So	2013	Chess	Men's
Silver	Jomar Balangui	2017	Wushu	Men's 52 kg sanda
Gold	Ernest Obiena	2019	Athletics	Men's pole vault

== See also ==
- Philippines at the Olympics
