= Archery at the 2017 Summer Universiade – Men's team recurve =

Men's team recurve at the XXIX Summer Universiade
- Venues: National Taiwan Sport University Stadium
- Dates: August 20, 2017 – August 24, 2017
- Competitors: 60 from 20 nations

Medalists
1st place, gold medalist(s)		Lee Seung-yun; Kim Woo-jin; Lee Woo-seok	South Korea
2nd place, silver medalist(s)		Wei Chun-heng; Deng Yu-cheng; Peng Shih-cheng	Chinese Taipei
3rd place, bronze medalist(s)		Arsalan Baldanov; Artem Makhnenko; Galsan Bazarzhapov	Russia

The men's team recurve archery competition at the 2017 Summer Universiade was held in the National Taiwan Sport University Stadium, Taipei, Taiwan between August 20–24, 2017.

== Records ==
Prior to the competition, the world and Universiade records were as follows.

- 216 arrows qualification round

Category	Team	Athlete	Score	Record	Date	Place	Event
World record	South Korea	Im Dong-hyun	699	2087	20 July 2012	London, United Kingdom	2012 Summer Olympics
World record	South Korea	Kim Bub-min	698	2087	20 July 2012	London, United Kingdom	2012 Summer Olympics
World record	South Korea	Oh Jin-hyek	690	2087	20 July 2012	London, United Kingdom	2012 Summer Olympics
Universiade record	South Korea	Lee Seung-yun	693	2062	4 July 2015	Gwangju, South Korea	2015 Summer Universiade
Universiade record	South Korea	Ku Bon-chan	686	2062	4 July 2015	Gwangju, South Korea	2015 Summer Universiade
Universiade record	South Korea	Kim Woo-jin	683	2062	4 July 2015	Gwangju, South Korea	2015 Summer Universiade

== Qualification round ==
Rank	Team	Archer	Individual			Team			Notes
Rank	Team	Archer	Score	10s	Xs	Total	10s	Xs	Notes
1	South Korea	Lee Seung-yun	689	43	18	2049	115	48	Q
1	South Korea	Kim Woo-jin	687	40	16	2049	115	48	Q
1	South Korea	Lee Woo-seok	673	32	14	2049	115	48	Q
2	Chinese Taipei	Wei Chun-heng	665	37	10	1982	92	27	Q
2	Chinese Taipei	Deng Yu-cheng	662	28	9	1982	92	27	Q
2	Chinese Taipei	Peng Shih-cheng	655	27	8	1982	92	27	Q
3	Russia	Arsalan Baldanov	665	30	9	1975	84	29	Q
3	Russia	Artem Makhnenko	657	30	11	1975	84	29	Q
3	Russia	Galsan Bazarzhapov	653	24	9	1975	84	29	Q
4	Japan	Wataru Oonuki	663	28	4	1973	75	13	Q
4	Japan	Masaya Yamamoto	661	26	4	1973	75	13	Q
4	Japan	Kazuki Ohi	649	21	5	1973	75	13	Q
5	Kazakhstan	Sultan Duzelbayev	659	30	10	1957	80	28	Q
5	Kazakhstan	Denis Gankin	651	26	12	1957	80	28	Q
5	Kazakhstan	Sanzhar Mussayev	647	24	6	1957	80	28	Q
6	Mexico	Jorge Ociel Nevárez Cárdenas	653	26	11	1945	69	20	Q
6	Mexico	Luis Álvarez	651	23	6	1945	69	20	Q
6	Mexico	Oldair Zamora Lira	641	20	3	1945	69	20	Q
7	Ukraine	Oleksii Hunbin	660	26	8	1933	64	18	Q
7	Ukraine	Heorhiy Ivanytskyy	660	25	9	1933	64	18	Q
7	Ukraine	Mykhailo Kostash	613	13	1	1933	64	18	Q
8	India	Pravin Ramesh Jadhav	652	22	6	1928	58	12	Q
8	India	Kamal Sagar	643	20	3	1928	58	12	Q
8	India	Inderjeet Verma	633	16	3	1928	58	12	Q
9	Germany	Maximilian Pete Weckmueller	654	24	9	1927	60	24	Q
9	Germany	Eric Skoeries	639	18	4	1927	60	24	Q
9	Germany	Johannes Maier	634	18	11	1927	60	24	Q
10	France	Mathieu Rene Er. Jimenez	651	22	7	1923	62	19	Q
10	France	Thomas Gino Mic Chirault	639	21	6	1923	62	19	Q
10	France	Thomas Alfred P Koenig	633	19	6	1923	62	19	Q
11	Great Britain	Thomas Howard Hall	656	30	9	1883	66	16	Q
11	Great Britain	Ashe-wynter Yio Morgan	631	28	5	1883	66	16	Q
11	Great Britain	Jack Alex Masefield	596	8	2	1883	66	16	Q
12	Italy	Massimiliano Mandia	656	28	11	1881	57	19	Q
12	Italy	Matteo Paoletta	631	19	4	1881	57	19	Q
12	Italy	Paolo Caruso	594	10	4	1881	57	19	Q
13	Slovenia	Gašper Štrajhar	630	20	3	1881	54	13	Q
13	Slovenia	Rok Bizjak	626	14	7	1881	54	13	Q
13	Slovenia	Den Habjan Malavasic	625	20	3	1881	54	13	Q
14	United States	Matthew Joseph Zumbo	639	20	6	1876	57	19	Q
14	United States	Dillon Fitzgera McMenamy	625	18	8	1876	57	19	Q
14	United States	David Matthew Wolfe	612	19	5	1876	57	19	Q
15	Poland	Kacper Pawel Sier	657	24	8	1875	54	15	Q
15	Poland	Adam Jurzak	616	18	4	1875	54	15	Q
15	Poland	Maciej Jarosław Fałdziński	602	12	3	1875	54	15	Q
16	Malaysia	Atiq Bazil Bakri	628	22	7	1870	54	14	Q
16	Malaysia	Muhamad Fareez Rosli	628	19	4	1870	54	14	Q
16	Malaysia	Nazir Omar	614	13	3	1870	54	14	Q
17	Finland	Antti Olavi Vikström	649	25	3	1860	55	14	
17	Finland	Eero Risto Yrja Maeenpaeae	607	14	5	1860	55	14	
17	Finland	Jaako Kalevi Hepola	604	16	6	1860	55	14	
18	Czech Republic	Michal Hlahůlek	604	18	7	1799	37	12	
18	Czech Republic	Vít Vejražka	603	12	5	1799	37	12	
18	Czech Republic	David Jaroch	592	7	0	1799	37	12	
19	Singapore	Teo Sion Wei Xiang	641	22	6	1780	46	12	
19	Singapore	Teo Kee Hui Keith	624	16	6	1780	46	12	
19	Singapore	Ho Alfred Wai Keon	515	8	0	1780	46	12	
20	Philippines	Jayson Mendoza	534	4	0	1498	15	0	
20	Philippines	Janus Ventura	505	8	0	1498	15	0	
20	Philippines	Jules Ecuan	459	3	0	1498	15	0	

== Elimination round ==
Round of 16
1	South Korea	6	51	53	56
16	Malaysia	0	48	44	43
9	Germany	6	52	49	51	47
8	India	2	50	52	44	33
5	Kazakhstan	5	47	53	50	50	T23
12	Italy	4	43	48	51	51	T14
13	Slovenia	4	47	47	49	56	T19
4	Japan	5	53	54	46	50	T24
3	Russia	6	54	53	53
14	United States	0	51	47	46
11	Great Britain	2	50	44	49	48
6	Mexico	6	55	51	44	50
7	Ukraine	0	47	48	44
10	France	6	50	54	54
15	Poland	4	52	45	52	52	T24
2	Chinese Taipei	5	53	52	48	50	T26

Quarterfinals
1	South Korea	6	54	57	55
9	Germany	0	53	52	37
5	Kazakhstan	5	55	51	53	51	T24
4	Japan	4	49	57	50	52	T18
3	Russia	6	54	52	58	57
6	Mexico	2	51	55	50	44
10	France	1	51	47	50
2	Chinese Taipei	5	51	54	53

Semifinals
1	South Korea	6	54	56	55
5	Kazakhstan	0	47	53	54
3	Russia	2	49	50	51	49
2	Chinese Taipei	6	54	45	52	55

Final
1	South Korea	6	58	59	58
2	Chinese Taipei	0	56	54	55
Third place
5	Kazakhstan	1	51	51	54
3	Russia	5	55	53	54
