= Philippines at the 2025 Summer World University Games =

- Flag of the Philippines
- IOC code: PHI
- National federation: Federation of School Sports Association of the Philippines
- Website: www.fessap.net

in Rhine-Ruhr, Germany 16 July 2025 – 27 July 2025
- Competitors: 34 in 7 sports
- Flag bearer: Edwin Fabro (FESSAP president)
- Medals: Gold 0 Silver 0 Bronze 0 Total 0

Summer World University Games appearances (overview)
- 1965; 1967; 1970–1985; 1987; 1989; 1991; 1993; 1995; 1997; 1999; 2001; 2003; 2005; 2007; 2009; 2011; 2013; 2015; 2017; 2019; 2021; 2025; 2027

The Philippines competed at the 2025 Summer World University Games, which was held from 16 July to 27 July 2025 in Rhine-Ruhr region, Germany.

The country entered athletes in seven disciplines namely archery, athletics, badminton, basketball, gymnastics, table tennis, and volleyball.

== Athletics ==
The University of Cebu is represented by Mark Mahinay in athletics.

Men
Track

Athlete	Event	Heat		Semi-finals		Final	
Athlete	Event	Result	Rank	Result	Rank	Result	Rank
Louie Agawa	800 metres	DQ; TR 17.2.3	8	Did not advance			
Mark Mahinay	1500 metres hurdles	3:55.07	12	—N/a		Did not advance	
Mark Mahinay	5000 metres hurdles	15:17.53	16	—N/a		Did not advance	
Mark Mahinay	10,000 metres hurdles	—N/a				31:29.38	23

== Archery ==
The Philippines sent two athletes.

- Keturah Collene Gonzales
- Wesley Joshua Tanco

== Badminton ==
The Philippines sent three athletes.

Men

- Thomas Neo Gatdula
- Dainyle Jeremel Orara

Women

- Maria Althea Ladiana

== Basketball ==
The Mapúa University Cardinals represented the Philippines in men's basketball having qualified via the FESSAP-organized Asian University Basketball Championships.

Team roster

Head coach: Melchor Divina

- 0 – Clint Escamis
- 1 – Marc Andrei Igliane
- 3 – Sherfrazkhan Abdulla
- 5 – John Christopher Recto
- 10 – Marc Cyrus Cuenco
- 14 – Cyril Rey Gonzales
- 19 – Earl Jaeron Sapasap
- 26 – Ivan Lazarte
- 34 – Yam Concepcion
- 40 – Joemakio Kewve Gulapa
- 86 – Marcus Cyrus Nitura
- 88 – Drex Jhon Leir Delos Reyes

Summary

Team	Event	Group stage				Quarterfinal	Classification round		
Team	Event	Opposition Score	Opposition Score	Opposition Score	Rank	Opposition Score	Opposition Score	Opposition Score	Rank
Philippines WUG men's	Men's tournament	Brazil; L 58–105	Czech Republic; L 47–100	Poland; L 67–79	4	Lebanon; L 67–73	Chile; W 77–69	Argentina; L 71–84	14

== Gymnastics ==
The Philippines sent three athletes in artistic gymnastics.

- Juancho Miguel Besana
- Romeo Santillan Jhon
- Colin Stenger

== Table tennis ==
The University of Cebu has four table tennis players representing the Philippines.

Athlete	Event	Group stage	Rank	Round of 128	Round of 64	Round of 32	Round of 16	Quarterfinals	Semifinals	Final	
Athlete	Event	Group stage	Rank	Opposition Result	Opposition Result	Opposition Result	Opposition Result	Opposition Result	Opposition Result	Opposition Result	Rank
Andrie Caballes	Men's singles	Alshareif (KSA); L 1–3	2 Q	Wu (USA); L 0–4 w/o	Did not advance						
Andrie Caballes	Men's singles	Mirzayev (AZE); W 3–0	2 Q	Wu (USA); L 0–4 w/o	Did not advance						
Raphael Misa	Men's singles	Zelinka (SVK); L 0–3	3	Did not advance							
Raphael Misa	Men's singles	Shah (PAK); L 1–3	3	Did not advance							
Allana Salar	Women's singles	Dari (HUN); L 0–3	3	Did not advance							
Allana Salar	Women's singles	Brzyska (POL); L 0–3	3	Did not advance							
Kristiene Alicaya	Women's singles	Wong H.T. (HKG); L 0–3	3	Did not advance							
Kristiene Alicaya	Women's singles	Im J. (KOR); L 0–3	3	Did not advance							
Andrie Caballes; Raphael Misa	Men's doubles	—N/a		—N/a	J. Tan; Yang Z.Y. (SGP); L 0–3	Did not advance					
Kristiene Alicaya; Allana Salar	Women's doubles	—N/a		—N/a	A. Tan; Wang (USA); L 2–3	Did not advance					
Raphael Misa; Kristiene Alicaya	Mixed doubles	—N/a		Bye	Movileanu; Zaharia (ROU); L 0–3 w/o	Did not advance					
Andrie Caballes; Allana Salar	Mixed doubles	—N/a		Bye	Araya; Muñoz (CHI); L 0–3 w/o	Did not advance					

== Volleyball ==
The NU Bulldogs were selected to represented the Philippines in men's volleyball. They qualified via the FESSAP-organized Philippine University Volleyball League. The NU has its four players unavailable due to being called up to the Philippines national volleyball team. The team had eight men in its roster.

Team roster

Head coach: Dante Alinsunurin

- 2 – Greg Ancheta
- 3 – Jeffe Gallego Jr.
- 4 – Mac Bandola
- 5 – Jan Llanfred Abanilla
- 7 – Miguel Egger
- 17 – Jimwell Gapultos
- 18 – Leo Aringo
- 23 – Jenngerard Arnfranz Diao

Summary

Team	Event	Group stage				Placement round			
Team	Event	Opposition Score	Opposition Score	Opposition Score	Rank	Opposition Score	Opposition Score	Opposition Score	Rank
Philippines WUG men's	Men's tournament	Poland; L 2–3	Colombia; L 0–3	Argentina; W 3–1	3 PR	Portugal; L 2–3	Chile; W 3–1	Argentina; L 2–3	14
