= Philippines at the 2023 Winter World University Games =

- IOC code: PHI
- National federation: Federation of School Sports Association of the Philippines
- Website: www.fessap.net

in Lake Placid, United States 12–22 January 2023
- Competitors: 4 in 3 sports
- Medals: Gold 0 Silver 0 Bronze 0 Total 0

Winter World University Games appearances (overview)
- 2019; 2023; 2025

The Philippines competed at the 2023 Winter World University Games in Lake Placid, United States, from 12 to 22 January 2023.

== Alpine skiing ==
Misha Fabian returns for the 2023 edition after competing as the sole representative of the Philippines in the 2019 edition. She is the lone woman in the Philippine delegation.

Men

Athlete	Event	Run 1		Run 2		Total	
Athlete	Event	Time	Rank	Time	Rank	Time	Rank
Theodore Sunshine	Giant Slalom	1:21.59	67	1:22.95	44	2:44.54	44
Theodore Sunshine	Slalom	DNF		—N/a		DNF	
Brandon Leitner	Giant Slalom	DNF		—N/a		DNF	
Brandon Leitner	Slalom	DNF		—N/a		DNF	

== Figure skating ==
Misha Fabian returns for the 2023 edition after competing as the sole representative of the Philippines in the 2019 edition. She is the lone woman in the Philippine delegation.

Singles

Athlete(s)	Event	SP		FP		Total	
Athlete(s)	Event	Points	Rank	Points	Rank	Points	Rank
Misha Fabian	Ladies	15.80	34th	Did not advance			

== Short track speed skating ==
Men

Athlete	Event	Heats		Heats		Quarterfinal		Semifinal		Final	
Athlete	Event	Time	Rank	Time	Time	Time	Rank	Time	Rank	Time	Rank
Julian Macaraeg	500 m	42.920	3	No time	5	Did not advance					28
Julian Macaraeg	1000 m	1:57.557	5	Did not advance							45

== See also ==
- Philippines at the 2019 Summer Universiade
