= Philippines at the 2019 Winter Universiade =

- IOC code: PHI
- National federation: Federation of School Sports Association of the Philippines
- Website: www.fessap.net

in Krasnoyarsk, Russia 2–17 March 2019
- Competitors: 1 in 1 sport
- Medals: Gold 0 Silver 0 Bronze 0 Total 0

Winter Universiade appearances (overview)
- 2019; 2023; 2025

The Philippines competed at the 2019 Winter Universiade in Krasnoyarsk, Russia. The Philippines only had a sole competitor in figure skating. This marked the first time the country competed in the Winter Universiade.

== Figure skating ==
The only athlete which represented the Philippines at the games was Misha Fabian who was accompanied by Ronan Jay Capili, her Filipino coach. She failed to advanced to the free program after placing 34th out of 35 competitors.

Singles

Athlete(s)	Event	SP		FP		Total	
Athlete(s)	Event	Points	Rank	Points	Rank	Points	Rank
Misha Fabian	Ladies	17.55	34th	Did not advance			

== See also ==
- Philippines at the 2019 Summer Universiade
