= David Mullarkey =

British long-distance runner (born 2000)

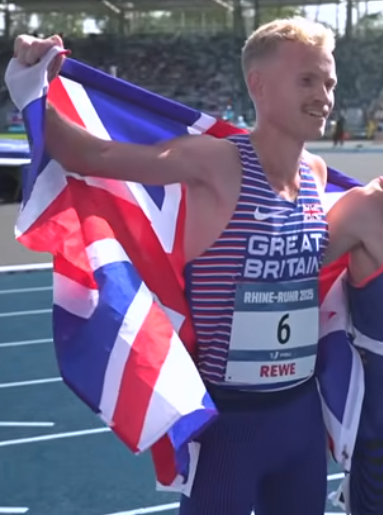
- At the 2025 Summer World University Games

Personal information
- Full name: David Steven Mullarkey
- Born: 7 March 2000 (age 26) Peel, Isle of Man

Sport
- Sport: Athletics
- Events: Long distance running, Cross country running
Medal record
Men's athletics
Representing Great Britain
Summer World University Games
| Silver medal – second place | 2025 Bochum | 10,000 metres |
| Silver medal – second place | 2025 Bochum | 5000 metres |
Representing Isle of Man
Commonwealth Games
| Bronze medal – third place | 2026 Glasgow | 10,000 m |

David Steven Mullarkey (born 7 March 2000) is a British long-distance runner. He won the 5000 metres at the 2026 UK Athletics Championships and won the bronze medal over 10,000 metres representing the Isle of Man at the 2026 Commonwealth Games.

== Early life ==
From Peel, Isle of Man, he attended Castle Rushen High School and Queen Elizabeth II High School, then studied at Leeds Beckett University, before running in the United States at both Florida State University and Northern Arizona University.

== Career ==
Mullarkey has broken Isle of Man men's track and field records over multiple distances on the track including the 1500 metres, mile, 3000 metres and 5000 metres, as well as on the road over 10 km. Mullarkey competed for the Isle of Man in the men's 5,000m at the 2022 Commonwealth Games in Birmingham, placing twelfth in the final in a new Manx record time of 13:43.92.

Competing for the University of Northern Arizona in the United States, Mallarkey finished eighteenth overall at the 2024 NCAA Division I cross country championships race in November 2024. He had earlier also competed for the Florida State Seminoles track and field team. At the Stanford Invitational Meeting in California in April 2025, he ran 27:51.80 seconds for the 10,000 metres to break the Isle of Man record for that distance, held by Keith Gerrard since 2011. He placed tenth in the final of the 2025 NCAA Division I Outdoor Track and Field Championships over 5,000 metres in Eugene, Oregon in June 2025.

He was selected for the British team to compete at the 2025 European Athletics Team Championships in Madrid in June 2025. His senior international debut for Great Britain saw him running 13:53.31 for eighth place in the men’s 5000m, helping the Great Britain team to finish in fifth place overall. He was named in the British team for the 2025 Summer World University Games in Germany, winning silver behind Kenyan Brian Musau in the 10,000 metres. Later in the same championships, he also won a silver medal over 5000 metres, behind Arthur Gervais of France.

Mullarkey was runner-up at the Manchester Road Race, Connecticut, on 27 November 2025, finishing behind Edwin Kurgat who broke the course record, with Mullarkey also finishing inside the previous course record set by Conner Mantz in 2022. The following month, he was selected at the 2026 World Athletics Cross Country Championships in Tallahassee, where he was the leading British finisher in 26th place. In March 2026, he ran a 10,000 metres personal best of 27:26.58 at The Ten in San Juan Capistrano. He ran a personal best for the 5000 m at the LA Track Fest on 23 May 2026, with 13:09.40, and a 3000 m personal best of 7:38.58 st the LA Grand Prix, the following month. On 22 June, he won the 5000 metres title at the 2026 UK Athletics Championships in Birmingham, running 13:27.00.

Mullarkey won the bronze medal representing the Isle of Man in the 10,000 metres at the 2026 Commonwealth Games in Glasgow on 28 July. On 1 August, he also ran in the 5000 metres race, placing eleventh. Representing Great Britain in the 10,000 metres at the 2026 European Athletics Championships in Birmingham on 15 August, he finished 12th in 28:25.58. Competing in the 5k at the 2026 World Athletics Road Running Championships on 19 September, Mullarkey was the leading British finisher in 21st with a personal best time of 13:31.
