= Bandy at the Winter World University Games =

Bandy was played for the first time in the 2019 Winter Universiade. It was one of the three optional sports chosen by the Organizing Committee of that edition.

== Men's results ==
Last updated after the 2019 Winter Universiade

Team	(Russia) 2019
Russia	1st
Sweden	2nd
Norway	3rd
Finland	4th
Kazakhstan	5th
Number of teams	5

=== Medals ===
==== Men ====
Year	Gold	Silver	Bronze
2019	Russia	Sweden	Norway

=== Women's results ===
Last updated after the 2019 Winter Universiade

Team	(Russia) 2019
Sweden	1st
Russia	2nd
Norway	3rd
United States	4th
Number of teams	4

=== Medals ===
==== Women ====
Year	Gold	Silver	Bronze
2019	Sweden	Russia	Norway

== Medal table ==
Last updated after the 2019 Winter Universiade

Rank	Nation	Gold	Silver	Bronze	Total
1	Russia (RUS)	1	1	0	2
1	Sweden (SWE)	1	1	0	2
3	Norway (NOR)	0	0	2	2
Totals (3 entries)		2	2	2	6
