= Philippines at the 2015 Summer Universiade =

- IOC code: PHI
- National federation: Federation of School Sports Association of the Philippines
- Website: www.fessap.net

in Gwangju, South Korea 3 – 14 July 2015
- Competitors: 63 in 5 sports
- Medals: Gold 0 Silver 0 Bronze 0 Total 0

Summer appearances
- 1965; 1967; 1970–1985; 2003; 2005; 2007; 2009; 2011; 2013; 2015; 2017; 2019

Winter appearances
- 2019

The Philippines participated at the 2015 Summer Universiade in Gwangju, South Korea.

For the first time in three appearances at the Universiade, the Philippines did not send a delegation for basketball. The Philippine Olympic Committee was criticized by PSL President Susan Papa for prohibiting players from its member national sports associations from participating at the tournament.

== Competitors ==
Sport	Men	Women	Total
Badminton	3	3	6
Judo	1	0	1
Swimming	25	19	44
Table tennis	3	3	6
Tennis	3	3	6
Total	35	28	63

== Judo ==
=== Men ===
Athlete	Event	Round of 16	Round of 8	Quarterfinals	Semifinals	Repechage Round 1	Repechage Round 2	Final of Repechage	Bronze Medal Contest	Final	
Athlete	Event	Opposition Result	Opposition Result	Opposition Result	Opposition Result	Opposition Result	Opposition Result	Opposition Result	Opposition Result	Opposition Result	Rank
Alfred Querubin	81 kg	(Hungary) Koller; L 000S2-101	Did not advance								

== See also ==
- Philippines at the Universiade
