= Philippines at the 2013 Summer Universiade =

- IOC code: PHI
- National federation: Federation of School Sports Association of the Philippines
- Website: www.fessap.net

in Kazan
- Competitors: 39 in 8 sports
- Flag bearer: Ariel Querubin
- Medals: Gold 1 Silver 0 Bronze 0 Total 1

Summer Universiade appearances (overview)
- 1965; 1967; 1970–1985; 1987; 1989; 1991; 1993; 1995; 1997; 1999; 2001; 2003; 2005; 2007; 2009; 2011; 2013; 2015; 2017; 2019; 2021; 2025; 2027

The Philippines competed at the 2013 Summer Universiade in Kazan, Russia from 6 to 17 July 2013. The Philippines sent 39 athletes.

The University Athletic Association of the Philippines (UAAP), the organization which previously sent athletes to the Universiade prohibited athletes from its member schools to participate in the 2013 edition of the Universiade as well as tournaments organized by Federation of School Sports Association of the Philippines.

The Philippines won its first gold medal from GM Wesley So in chess.

== Badminton ==
Men

Athlete	Event	Round of 128	Round of 64	Round of 32	Round of 16	Quarterfinals	Semifinals	Final 2	Rank
Athlete	Event	Opposition Score	Opposition Score	Opposition Score	Opposition Score	Opposition Score	Opposition Score	Opposition Score	Rank
Salvador Jaymon Kapunan	Singles	Bye	(Malaysia) Loh; L 10-21, 10-21	did not advance					33

== Basketball ==
=== Men ===
The men's team participated at Group B. The Philippines was basically represented by the collegiate team University of the Visayas Green Lancers sans their two Cameroonian imports. The team won its right to represent the country by winning the National Students Basketball Championship, which was under the auspices of the Federation of School Sports Association of the Philippines

Team roster

Philippine Men's World University Games team roster
Players
Coaches

Pos.	No.	Name	Age – Date of birth	Height	Club	Ctr.
SG		Hernal Escosio	22 – December 6, 1990		University of the Visayas	(Philippines)
PG		John Michael Abad	22 – September 28, 1990		University of the Visayas	(Philippines)
C		Chris Yonnel Perolino (C)	20 – February 14, 1993		University of the Visayas	(Philippines)
PF		Rhaffy Octubre	21 – January 27, 1992		University of the Visayas	(Philippines)
SF		Angelo Babia	22 – September 23, 1990		University of the Visayas	(Philippines)
SF		Vincent Mendoza	20 – February 3, 1993		University of the Visayas	(Philippines)
SF		Arvie Cabañero	22 – March 24, 1991		University of the Visayas	(Philippines)
SF		Mico Adam Marquez	21 – March 1, 1992		University of the Visayas	(Philippines)
SF		Alfred Codilla	21 – October 5, 1991		University of the Visayas	(Philippines)
SF		Christian Fajardo	22 – March 23, 1991		University of the Visayas	(Philippines)

Head coach

- Felix Belano Jr.

Assistant coach

- Van Halen Parmis

Team manager

- Gerald Anthony Gullas

Legend

- (C) Team captain
- Club – describes last
  club before the tournament
- Age – describes age
  on July 7, 2013

Group B

Team	Pld	W	L	PF	PA	PD	Pts
Serbia	5	5	0	413	221	+192	10
Romania	5	4	1	315	274	+41	9
Mexico	5	3	2	326	301	+25	8
Mongolia	5	2	3	277	379	−102	7
Japan	5	1	4	284	340	−56	6
Philippines	5	0	5	0	100	−100	5

The Philippine national team was disqualified for leaving the tournament before the quarterfinal round. All five group stage games that the Philippines played were assigned 0-20 defeats as the result of the qualification. Have the Philippines played their quarterfinal match, they would have played against Ukraine.

The following matches were the scoreline of the Philippines prior to the team's disqualification.

7 July 2013
10:30

Report

Romania	106–58	Philippines
Scoring by quarter: 22–8, 18–16, 35–21, 31–13
Pts: Torok 15; Rebs: Guțoaia 5 Asts: Tibirna 11		Pts: Abad 19; Rebs: Perolino 6 Asts: Abad 2

Basket-Hall Arena

8 July 2013
18:00

Report

Serbia	125–44	Philippines
Scoring by quarter: 24–15, 35–11, 29–10, 37–8
Pts: Dimić 22; Rebs: Djokić 10; Asts: Marković 6		Pts: Abad 8 Rebs: Perolino 6 Asts: Abad 1

Basket-Hall Arena

9 July 2013
12:30

Report

Japan	93–51	Philippines
Scoring by quarter: 20–12, 20–9, 22–19, 31–11
Pts: Fujitaka 17; Rebs: Uto 3 Asts: Fujii 10		Pts: Octobre 15; Rebs: Abad 8 Asts: Codilla 2

Basket-Hall Arena

11 July 2013
18:00

Report

Philippines	79–92	Mongolia
Scoring by quarter: 26–23, 12–24, 17–20, 25–24
Pts: Abad 30; Rebs: Abad 3 Asts: Abad 11		Pts: Battuvshin 26; Rebs: Otgonbayar 7 Asts: Battuvshin 6

Basket-Hall Arena

12 July 2013
20:30

Report

Mexico	139–67	Philippines
Scoring by quarter: 34–11, 37–15, 39–16, 29–25
Pts: Cheda 23; Rebs: Santana 8 Asts: Gutierrez 9		Pts: Cris Perolino 15; Rebs: Escosio 7 Asts: Codilla 4

Basket-Hall Arena

== Chess ==
Athlete	Event	Win	Draw	Lost	Points	Rank
Wesley So	Men's individual	4	5	0	6.5	1st place, gold medalist(s)
Mary Israel Palero	Women's individual	2	3	4	3.5	55

== Medalists ==
Medal	Name	Sport	Event	Date
Gold	Wesley So	Chess	Chess	15 July
