= Philippines at the 2007 Summer Universiade =

- IOC code: PHI
- National federation: University Athletic Association of the Philippines (de facto)
- Website: www.fessap.net
- Competitors: 34 in 4 sports
- Medals Ranked 63rd: Gold 0 Silver 0 Bronze 1 Total 1

Summer Universiade appearances (overview)
- 1965; 1967; 1970–1985; 1987; 1989; 1991; 1993; 1995; 1997; 1999; 2001; 2003; 2005; 2007; 2009; 2011; 2013; 2015; 2017; 2019; 2021; 2025; 2027

The Philippines competed at the 2007 Summer Universiade also known as the XXIV Summer Universiade, in Bangkok, Thailand.

The delegation composed of 34 athletes competing in four sports and is joined by 11 officials. Their participation is sanctioned by the University Athletic Association of the Philippines (UAAP). This is the last time that the UAAP sanctioned athletes competing for the country in the Universiade after the Federation of School Sports Association of the Philippines was granted membership by the International University Sports Federation (FISU).

== Competitors ==
Sport	Total
Fencing	4
Shooting	10
Swimming	9
Taekwondo	11
Total	34

Source: GMA News

== Medalists ==
Medal	Name	Sport	Event	Date
Bronze	Maria Criselda Roxas	Taekwondo	Women's 72 kg	August 9
