= 2019 Universiade =

2019 Universiade may refer to:

- 2019 Summer Universiade, a summer sporting event held in Italy
- 2019 Winter Universiade, a winter sporting event held in Russia
