= Philippines at the 2025 Winter World University Games =

- IOC code: PHI
- National federation: Federation of School Sports Association of the Philippines
- Website: www.fessap.net

in Turin, Italy 13–23 January 2025
- Competitors: 1 in 1 sport
- Flag bearer: Skye Chua (figure skating)
- Medals: Gold 0 Silver 0 Bronze 0 Total 0

Winter World University Games appearances (overview)
- 2019; 2023; 2025

The Philippines competed at the 2025 Winter World University Games in Turin, Italy. The Philippines fielded a lone competitor – in figure skating.

== Figure skating ==
The only athlete to represent the Philippines at the games was Skye Chua from the University of the Philippines. She finished with 26.69 points in the short program placing 32nd place. She failed to advance to the free program.

Singles

Athlete(s)	Event	SP		FP		Total	
Athlete(s)	Event	Points	Rank	Points	Rank	Points	Rank
Skye Chua	Ladies	26.69	32	Did not advance		26.69	32
