= Malaysia at the 2011 Winter Universiade =

- IOC code: MAS
- National federation: Malaysian University Sports Council
- Website: www.masum.org.my
- Competitors: 1 in 1 sport
- Medals: Gold 0 Silver 0 Bronze 0 Total 0

Winter Universiade appearances (overview)
- 2011; 2013–2015; 2017; 2019; 2023; 2025

Malaysia competed at the 2011 Winter Universiade in Erzurum, Turkey.

== Figure skating ==
Men

| Athlete(s) | Event | SP/OD | | FS/FD | | Total | |
| Athlete(s) | Event | Points | Rank | Points | Rank | Points | Rank |
|---|---|---|---|---|---|---|---|
| Allysha Tan | Women's | 17.40 | 32 | 31.17 | 32 | 48.57 | 32 |
