= Lidia Ruslanova =

Lidia Andreyevna Ruslanova Лидия Андреевна Русланова
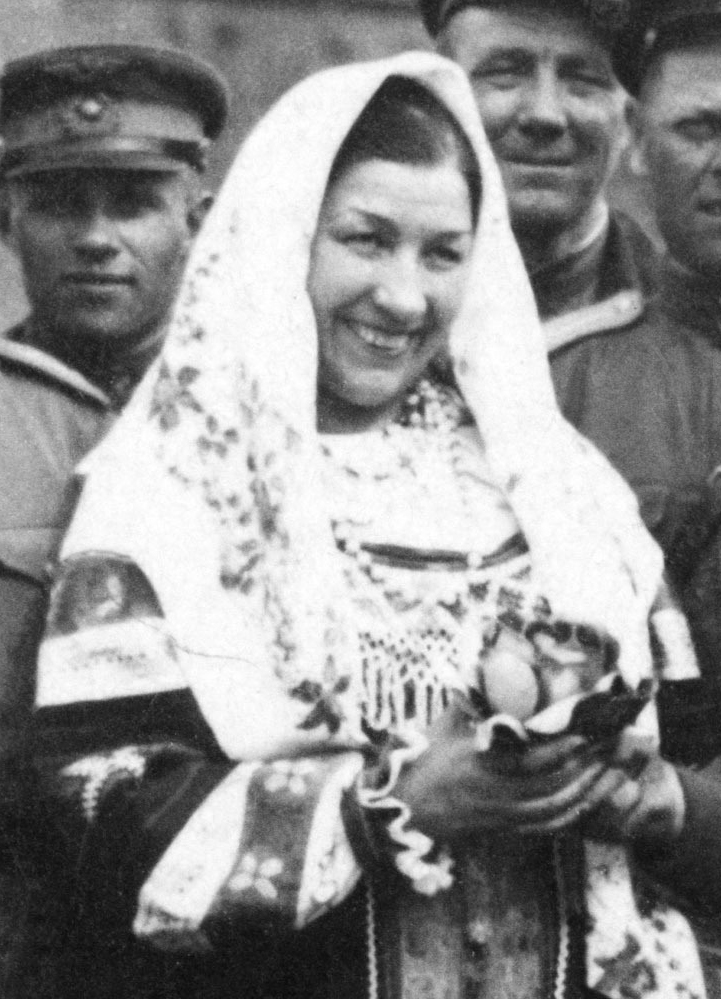
- Ruslanova in Berlin, 1945

Background information
- Born: Praskovya Andrianovna Leykina-Gorshenina; Russian: Прасковья Андриановна Ле́йкина-Горшенина; 27 October 1900; Chernavka, Serdobsky Uyezd, Saratov Governorate, Russian Empire
- Died: 21 September 1973 (aged 72) Moscow, USSR
- Genres: Russian folk music, Russian romance
- Instrument: singing

Lidia Andreyevna Ruslanova (sometimes spelt Lidiya or Lydia, Russian: Лидия Андреевна Русланова; 27 October 1900 in Saratov Governorate – 21 September 1973 in Moscow) was a famous Soviet singer contralto and performer of Russian folk songs.

== Early life ==
She was born in the village of Chernavka near Saratov, into a peasant family, and was baptized as Praskovya Andrianovna Leykina-Gorshenina (Russian: Прасковья Андриановна Ле́йкина-Горшенина). She came from a Mordvin family, according to some sources from the Moksha subethnic group, according to others, her mother was an Erzya by ethnicity. By the time she was five, both her parents had died; her father in the Russo-Japanese War and her mother soon after. As a result, she spent most of her childhood in an orphanage. She began singing when she joined the local parish children's choir and soon became a soloist.

Her uncle invited her to work in a furniture factory. One of the factory's owners heard her singing as she worked and recommended that she go to study at the Saratov Conservatory. However, she did not enjoy academic study. During the First World War, she worked on a hospital train and met Vitalii Stepanov during this period, with whom she had a child, born in May 1917. He left her after a year, due to her erratic lifestyle. According to a Saratov source, she married a different man who later died in the Russian Civil War, whom she took her surname from.

== Career ==
Ruslanova gave her first concert at the age of 16, to a military audience, where she sang everything she knew. She first started singing for Russian soldiers during the Russian Civil War, and debuted as a professional singer in Rostov-on-Don in 1923. She was noted for her peculiar singing voice and timbre, which was a revival of old traditions in which female soloists would perform on festive occasions. Until 1929, she lived with a Cheka official, then she married again, this time to Vladimir Kryukov.

During the 1930s, Ruslanova became extremely popular. She became an artist of the state association of musical, variety and circus enterprises in 1933, and performed all over Russia throughout the rest of the decade. When World War II broke out, she ceaselessly toured from one front to another, helping to boost the soldiers' courage with her patriotic songs. Her signature songs were Valenki and Katyusha, written specially for her. During the Battle of Berlin, she performed on the doorsteps of the smouldering Reichstag.

Ruslanova became one of the richest women in Soviet Russia and even financed the construction of two Katyusha batteries, which she presented to the Red Army in 1942. That same year, she was made an Artist of Honour of the Russian Soviet Federative Socialist Republic. Her rough manners and racy language appealed to the soldiers to the point that she was regarded as a potential threat to the Soviet authorities. In 1948, due to association with Marshal Georgy Zhukov (who led the Red Army to the defeat of Nazi-Germany during World War II, and who became a strong political opponent of Joseph Stalin in the post-war years) Ruslanova's husband, Hero of the Soviet Union, Lieutenant-General Vladimir Kryukov was arrested and Ruslanova followed two years later. Ruslanova was forced to sign a declaration that her husband was guilty of treason, but refused, so she was sentenced to 10 years of camp labour.

In the gulag she was dispatched to, Ruslanova became a star lionized by inmates and administration alike. Therefore, she was moved to a prison cell in the Vladimirsky Tsentral. Following Stalin's death, she was released on 4 August 1953; she was thin, gray, and had difficulty walking. However, she returned to singing almost immediately. Her time in prison was unmentioned in the press until decades after. Although awards and titles bypassed her, Ruslanova presided over the first All-Soviet Festival of Soviet Songs, together with Leonid Utyosov, Mark Bernes, and Klavdiya Shulzhenko. She went on singing right up until her death in 1973, at the age of 72.

== Death ==
On September 21, 1973, Lidiya Andreyevna Ruslanova died in Moscow, in her 73rd year, of a heart attack. Traces of several previous heart attacks were found on her heart. She was buried at Novodevichy Cemetery next to her husband, Vladimir Kryukov (plot No. 5). A large number of people came to pay their last respects, and traffic near Novodevichy Cemetery in Moscow was halted as a result.

Ruslanova crater on Venus is named after her.

== Discography ==
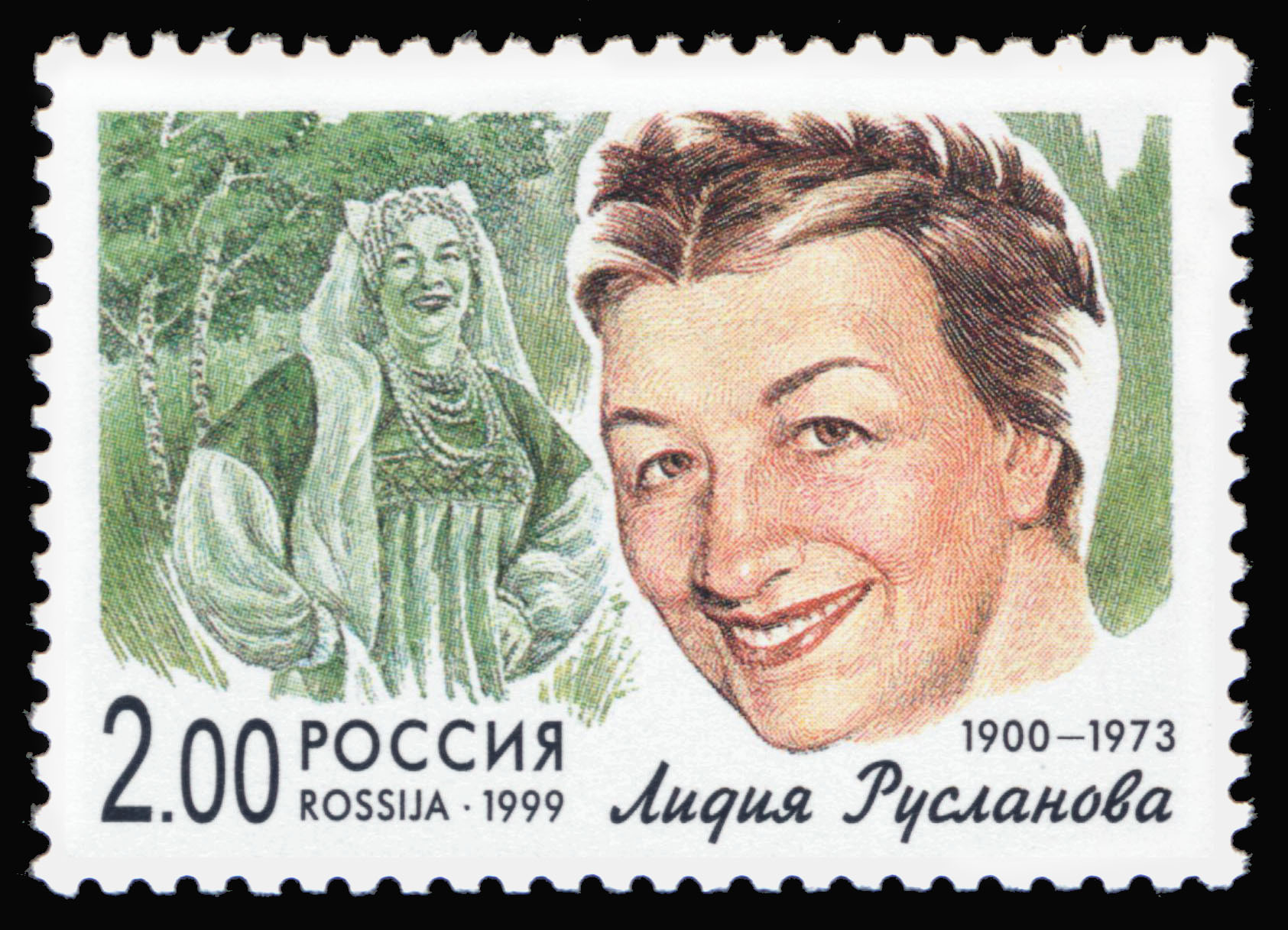
Stamp of Russia devoted to Lidiya Ruslanova, 1999, 2 rub. (Michel 759, Scott 6545)

- 1996: Поёт Лидия Русланова (Lydia Ruslanova sings)
- 2000: Царица Русской песни (Queen of the Russian Song)
- 2001: Великие исполнители России XX века (Great performers of Russia of the XX century)
- 2002: Русские народные песни (Russian folk songs)
- 2007: Имена на все времена (Names for all time)
