= Malaysia at the 2025 Winter World University Games =

- IOC code: MAS
- National federation: University Sports Council of Malaysia
- Website: www.masum.org.my

in Turin, Italy 13–23 January 2025
- Competitors: 1 in 1 sport
- Medals: Gold 0 Silver 0 Bronze 0 Total 0

Winter World University Games appearances
- 2011; 2013–2015; 2017; 2019; 2023; 2025

Malaysia competed at the 2025 Winter World University Games in Turin, Italy. Malaysia fielded a lone competitor – in figure skating.

== Figure skating ==
The only athlete representing Malaysia at the games was Fang Ze Feng from Sunway University.

Singles

Athlete(s)	Event	SP		FP		Total	
Athlete(s)	Event	Points	Rank	Points	Rank	Points	Rank
Fang Ze Feng	Men	54.14	28	Did not advance		54.14	28
