= Bandy at the 2019 Winter Universiade =

Bandy at the XXIX Winter Universiade
- Dates: 1–10 March 2019
- Teams: 5 (men); 4 (women)

Bandy at the 2019 Winter Universiade was held from 1 to 10 March (men's tournament) and from 1 to 8 March (women's tournament) at the Yenisey Stadium in Krasnoyarsk. For the first time bandy was an optional sport at the program of the Winter Universiade. It had bigger spectator crowds than any other sport.

== Venues ==
Krasnoyarsk
Yenisey Stadium
Capacity: 5000
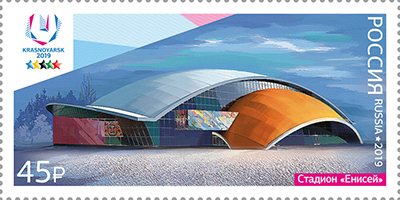

== Men's tournament ==
2019 Winter Universiade men's tournament
Tournament details
- Host country: Russia
- Venue(s): 1 (in 1 host city)
- Dates: 1–10 March
- Teams: 5

Final positions
- Champions: Russia (1st title)
- Runner-up: Sweden
- Third place: Norway
- Fourth place: Finland

Tournament statistics
- Games played: 14
- Goals scored: 124 (8.86 per game)
- Scoring leader(s): Sergei Gan (13 goals)

Official website
- results.krsk2019.ru

=== Preliminary round ===
Pos	Team	Pld	W	D	L	GF	GA	GD	Pts	Qualification
1	Russia (H)	4	4	0	0	33	5	+28	8	Semifinals
2	Sweden	4	3	0	1	33	9	+24	6	Semifinals
3	Norway	4	1	0	3	7	21	−14	2 (Note: Norway 2 Pts, +2 GD; Finland 2 Pts, 0 GD; Kazakhstan 2 Pts, –2 GD)	Semifinals
4	Finland	4	1	0	3	7	23	−16	2	Semifinals
5	Kazakhstan	4	1	0	3	6	28	−22	2	

Source: Krasnoyarsk 2019
(H) Hosts
Notes:

All times are local (UTC+7).

1 March
17:00

Sweden	8–0	Norway
Elebring 8', 72'; Rönnqvist 38'; Enander 46', 71'; Frohm 53'; Lövstedt 69'; Engholm 85'	Report

Yenisey Stadium, Krasnoyarsk
Attendance: 1,000
Referee: Mika Antero Mutanen
1 March
20:00

Russia	9–1	Kazakhstan
Gan 2', 22' (p), 50' (p); Kuznetsov 19'; Pleshivtsev 24'; Dashkov 27', 76'; Legoshin 78'; Veselov 85'	Report	Bekturgan 88'

Yenisey Stadium, Krasnoyarsk
Attendance: 4,500
Referee: David Eneland
2 March
11:00

Finland	1–10	Sweden
Räisänen 37' (p)	Report	Elebring 7', 12'; Engholm 28' (p); Rönnqvist 35'; Lövstedt 42'; Frohm 46'; Sigfridsson 49', 60' (p), 85' (p), 90'

Yenisey Stadium, Krasnoyarsk
Attendance: 2,500
Referee: Viacheslav Kurbanov
3 March
19:00

Finland	4–1	Kazakhstan
Antikainen 19'; Perdén 50'; Holopainen 57'; Islander 58'	Report	Utebaliyev 28'

Yenisey Stadium, Krasnoyarsk
Attendance: 3,000
Referee: Viacheslav Kurbanov
4 March
16:00

Sweden	13–1	Kazakhstan
Emanuelsson 3'; Sigfridsson 13'; Engholm 19' (p), 47'; Frohm 20', 75'; Rönnqvist 24', 43'; Lövstedt 49'; Enander 65'; Edberg 67'; Ortman 73'; Norrman 81'	Report	Sveshnikov 52'

Yenisey Stadium, Krasnoyarsk
Attendance: 1,700
Referee: Mika Mutanen
4 March
19:00

Norway	1–9	Russia
Sørensen 28'	Report	Pavensky 1', 41'; Dashkov 4', 84'; Gan 12', 47'; Kuznetsov 31'; Sergeev 52'; Petrov 75'

Yenisey Stadium, Krasnoyarsk
Attendance: 4,650
Referee: David Eneland
5 March
16:00

Kazakhstan	3–2	Norway
Utebaliyev 1', 67' (p); Guchshin 43'	Report	Lunden 18'; Stærkeby 58'

Yenisey Stadium, Krasnoyarsk
Attendance: 2,700
Referee: Mika Antero Mutanen
6 March
19:00

Finland	1–8	Russia
Valtanen 70'	Report	Bondarenko 5'; Kuznetsov 25', 57'; Dashkov 36'; Chupin 48', 80'; Gan 60', 78'

Yenisey Stadium, Krasnoyarsk
Attendance: 4,000
Referee: David Eneland
7 March
16:00

Norway	4–1	Finland
Tjomsland 2', 56'; Tho 9'; Jerner 14' (p)	Report	Holopainen 6'

Yenisey Stadium, Krasnoyarsk
Attendance: 3,000
Referee: Viacheslav Kurbanov
8 March
12:00

Russia	7–2	Sweden
Sergeev 11'; Gan 27' (p), 69', 71'; Pavensky 32', 50'; Chupin 39'	Report	Frohm 47'; Elebring 78'

Yenisey Stadium, Krasnoyarsk
Attendance: 4,850
Referee: David Eneland

=== Playoff round ===
==== Bracket ====
Semifinals
9 March
Russia	11
Finland	1
9 March
Sweden	8
Norway	3

Final
10 March
Russia	6
Sweden	1
Third place
10 March
Norway	5
Finland	3

==== Semifinals ====
9 March
15:00

Russia	11–1	Finland
Dashkov 7', 44', 54'; Pavensky 12', 83'; Konkov 28'; Legoshin 30'; Gan 65'; Veselov 67'; Chupin 75'; Kuznetsov 81'	Report	Räisänen 76'

Yenisey Stadium, Krasnoyarsk
Attendance: 3,620
Referee: Mika Antero Mutanen
9 March
19:00

Sweden	8–3	Norway
Mårtensson 5'; Enander 17'; Sigfridsson 24'; Frohm 40', 52'; Engholm 50'; Lövstedt 58', 83'	Report	Sørensen 7'; Stensrud 12'; Ø. Johnsen 69'

Yenisey Stadium, Krasnoyarsk
Attendance: 4,500
Referee: Viacheslav Kurbanov

==== Bronze medal game ====
10 March
15:00

(bronze) Norway	5–3	Finland
Jerner 7'; Stensrud 13'; Lunden 21'; Tjomsland 29'; Ø. Johnsen 53'	Report	Ikävalko 54'; Främling 75'; Tulomäki 87'

Yenisey Stadium, Krasnoyarsk
Attendance: 4,500
Referee: David Eneland

==== Gold medal game ====
10 March
19:00

(gold) Russia	6–1	Sweden (silver)
Gan 16', 62'; Petrov 17', 81'; Kuznetsov 42'; Bondarenko 53'	Report	Lövstedt 52'

Yenisey Stadium, Krasnoyarsk
Attendance: 4,910
Referee: Mika Antero Mutanen

== Women's tournament ==
The 2019 Winter Universiade saw four national women's bandy teams compete for gold in women's bandy. The four competing nations included: Russia, Sweden, Norway, and the USA.

2019 Winter Universiade Women's Tournament
Tournament details
- Host country: Russia
- Venue(s): 1 (in 1 host city)
- Dates: 1–8 March
- Teams: 4

Final positions
- Champions: Sweden (1st title)
- Runner-up: Russia
- Third place: Norway
- Fourth place: United States

Tournament statistics
- Games played: 10
- Goals scored: 100 (10 per game)
- Scoring leader(s): Olga Bogdanova (14 goals)

Official website
- results.krsk2019.ru

=== Preliminary round ===
Pos	Team	Pld	W	D	L	GF	GA	GD	Pts	Qualification
1	Russia (H)	3	3	0	0	19	3	+16	6	Semifinals
2	Sweden	3	2	0	1	36	5	+31	4	Semifinals
3	Norway	3	1	0	2	7	18	−11	2	Semifinals
4	United States	3	0	0	3	1	37	−36	0	Semifinals

Source: Krasnoyarsk 2019
(H) Hosts

All times are local (UTC+7).

1 March
11:00

Sweden	20–0	United States
Friman 2', 20', 41', 43', 80'; Svenler 13', 49', 51', 75'; Larsson 18', 30', 64', 89'; Björk Öhman 28'; Persson 46'; Ögren 56'; Aronsson 77' (p), 82'; Gustafsson 80'; Norrman 84'	Report

Yenisey Stadium, Krasnoyarsk
Attendance: 507
Referee: Kristina Prokofyeva
1 March
14:00

Russia	4–0	Norway
Lipanova 6', 64'; Mashinskaia 8' (p), 71'	Report

Yenisey Stadium, Krasnoyarsk
Attendance: 1,000
Referee: Linn Strömberg
3 March
10:00

Norway	6–0	United States
Storvik 24'; Kvaal-Knutsen 11'; Kragset 57', 86'; Aamodt 68', 89'	Report

Yenisey Stadium, Krasnoyarsk
Attendance: 350
Referee: Linn Strömberg
3 March
13:00

Russia	4–2	Sweden
Bogdanova 19', 69', 80'; Denisova 77'	Report	Svenler 34' (p), 67' (p)

Yenisey Stadium, Krasnoyarsk
Attendance: 3,100
Referee: Kristina Prokofyeva
4 March
13:00

Sweden	14–1	Norway
Larsson 17', 19', 79', 90'; Björk Öhman 23', 82'; Nilsson 35'; Aronsson 46', 48'; Svenler 56' (p), 70'; Ögren 57', 87'; Friman 61'	Report	Holm 5'

Yenisey Stadium, Krasnoyarsk
Attendance: 1,050
Referee: Victoria Bergström
5 March
13:00

United States	1–11	Russia
Rogers 82' (p)	Report	Bogdanova 9', 20', 24', 53', 61', 69'; Kuznetsova 17', 74'; Lipanova 36'; Mashinskaia 42'; Toktubaeva 78'

Yenisey Stadium, Krasnoyarsk
Attendance: 3,400
Referee: Kristina Prokofyeva

=== Playoff round ===
==== Bracket ====
Semifinals
6 March
Sweden	12
Norway	1
6 March
Russia	10
United States	1

Final
8 March
Sweden	5
Russia	3
Third place
8 March
Norway	4
United States	1

==== Semifinals ====
6 March
10:00

Sweden	12–1	Norway
Svenler 3', 43'; Gustafsson 8', 82'; Berner 34'; Larsson 39', 51', 71'; Persson 67'; Björk Öhman 72'; Friman 79', 80'	Report	Kvaal-Knutsen 19'

Yenisey Stadium, Krasnoyarsk
Attendance: 1,200
Referee: Kristina Prokofyeva
6 March
13:00

Russia	10–1	United States
Denisova 4', 35', 60'; Bogdanova 39', 69', 80', 83'; Mashinskaia 41', 55', 69'	Report	Lieske 87'

Yenisey Stadium, Krasnoyarsk
Attendance: 1,100
Referee: Victoria Bergström

==== Bronze medal game ====
8 March
15:00

(bronze) Norway	4–1	United States
Aamodt 17'; Grönquist 37'; Holm 51'; Kvaal-Knutsen 69'	Report	Lieske 79'

Yenisey Stadium, Krasnoyarsk
Attendance: 3,650
Referee: Linn Strömberg

==== Gold medal game ====
8 March
19:00

(gold) Sweden	5–3	Russia (silver)
Ögren 46'; Larsson 50', 88'; Friman 84'; Svenler 86' (p)	Report	Bogdanova 13'; Denisova 40'; Lipanova 62' (p)

Yenisey Stadium, Krasnoyarsk
Attendance: 4,900
Referee: Kristina Prokofyeva
