= Malaysia at the 2019 Winter Universiade =

- IOC code: MAS
- National federation: Malaysian University Sports Council
- Website: www.masum.org.my

in Krasnoyarsk, Russia 2–17 March 2019
- Competitors: 1 in 1 sport
- Medals: Gold 0 Silver 0 Bronze 0 Total 0

Winter Universiade appearances (overview)
- 2011; 2013–2015; 2017; 2019; 2023; 2025

Malaysia competed at the 2019 Winter Universiade in Krasnoyarsk, Russia. Malaysia had a sole competitor in figure skating.

== Figure skating ==
Singles

Athlete(s)	Event	SP		FP		Total	
Athlete(s)	Event	Points	Rank	Points	Rank	Points	Rank
Sze Chyi Chew	Ladies	20.51	33rd	Did not advance			

== See also ==
- Malaysia at the 2019 Summer Universiade
