= Arthur Gervais =

French long-distance runner (born 2000)

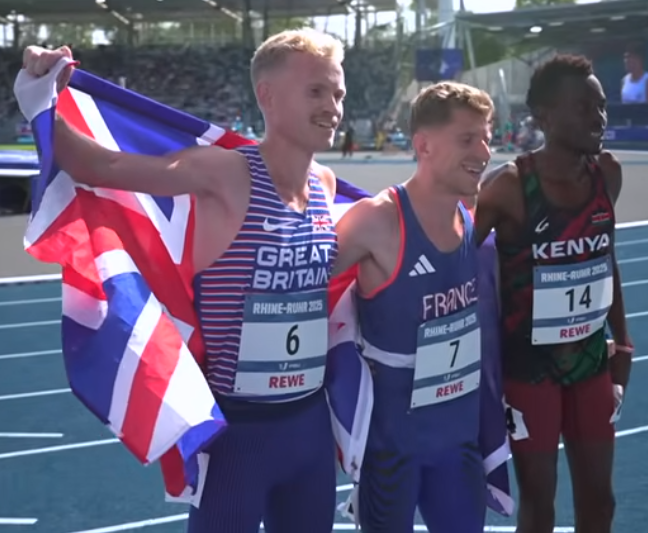
- Gervais in 2025

Personal information
- Born: 28 February 2000 (age 26) Villeneuve-d'Ascq, France
- Height: 169 cm (5 ft 7 in)
- Weight: 58 kg (128 lb)

Sport
- Country: France
- Sport: Athletics
- Events: Middle-distance running; Long-distance running

Achievements and titles
- Personal bests: 800m: 1:48.46 (2025); 1500m: 3:34.94 (2026); Mile: 3:53.17 (2023); 5000m: 13:27.25 (2024); Indoor; 800m: 1:50.05 (2021); 1500m: 3:38.72 (2025); Mile: 3:53.81 (2025); 3000m: 7:38.90 (2025); Road; 5k: 13:32 (2025); 10k: 28:52 (2025)
Medal record
Men's athletics
Representing France
Summer World University Games
Gold medal – first place	2025 Bochum	5000 metres

Arthur Gervais (born 28 February 2000) is a French middle- and long-distance runner. He won the 5000 metres at the World University Games.

== Biography ==
From Villeneuve-d'Ascq, and trained by Olivier Rock at Villeneuve d'Ascq Fretin Athlétisme (VAFA), Gervais won French junior outdoor and indoor titles in 2019. He won the French under-23 championships and placed third over 1500 metres at the senior French Indoor Athletics Championships the following year. In 2021, he again won the French under-23 indoor title. In 2022, he broke his personal bests with a time of 3:41.68 for the 1500 metres and 8:03.09 for the 3000 metres. He was then runner-up in 8:00.44 for the 3000 metres at the 2022 French Indoor Championships.

Gervais placed third over 1500 metres at the 2023 French Athletics Championships in Albi. Gervais won the gold medal over 5000 metres at the World University Games in Bochum, Germany, winning ahead of David Mullarkey of Great Britain.
