= Julian Macaraeg =

Filipino-American short track speed skater

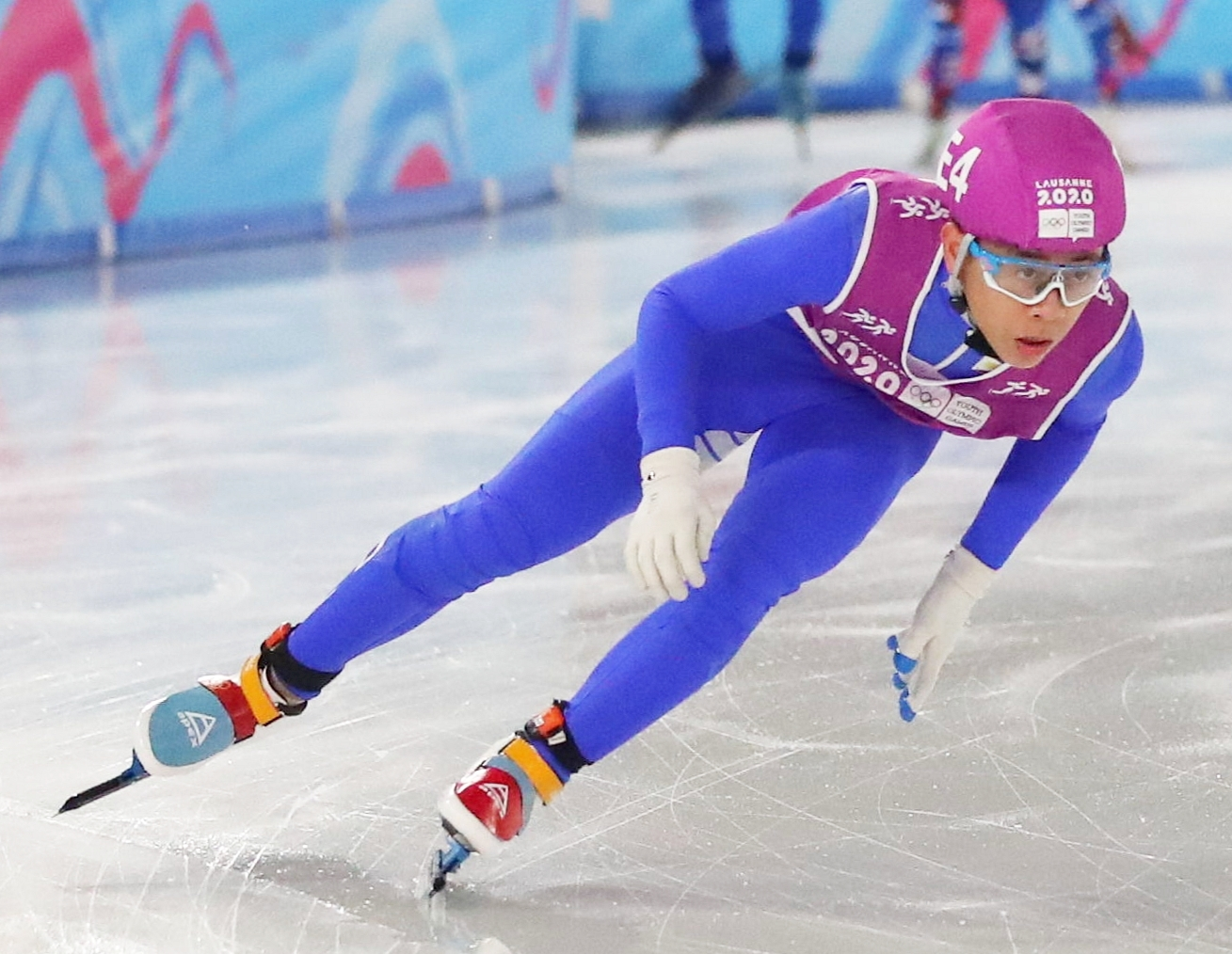

Personal information
- Born: May 15, 2003 (age 23) New York City, United States

Sport
- Country: Philippines
- Sport: Short track speed skating

Achievements and titles
- Personal best: 1000 m: 1:28.092 (2019)

Julian Kyle Silverio Macaraeg (born May 15, 2003) is a Filipino-American short-track speed skater who competed in the 2020 Winter Youth Olympics in Lausanne.

== Early life ==
Julian Macaraeg was born on May 15, 2003, in New York City to Filipino parents who immigrated to the United States in the 1990s. Macaraeg began skating at the age of three and also played ice hockey at the age of 4 and then switched to speed skating in 2010. On April 18, 2021, Macaraeg announced that he would be attending the University of California, Los Angeles.

== Career ==
=== 2019 Southeast Asian Games ===
Macaraeg competed at short track speed skating event of the 2019 Southeast Asian Games which was hosted at in the Philippines. However he did not win a medal.

=== 2020 Winter Youth Olympics ===
Macaraeg was one of two Filipino athletes to be selected to attend the 2020 Winter Youth Olympics, and in doing so became the first Filipino short track speed skater to compete at the Youth Olympics. He qualified through his second-place finish in the 500m event of the 2019 ISU Junior World Short Track Championships in Canada. In the 500m, Macaraeg won his qualifying heat, moving him on to the quarterfinals, however he did not advance in the 1000m, and his Mixed-NOC relay made it to the B Final.

=== 2021 World Championships ===
At the 2021 World Short Track Speed Skating Championships in the Netherlands, Macaraeg is the sole competitor for the Philippines for the tournament. He competed in the 500m, 1,000m, and 1,500m events placing 39th, 42nd, and 35th, respectively.

=== 2023 Winter World University Games ===
He is among the four competitors for the Philippines at the 2023 Winter World University Games. He competed in both 500m and 1,000m. He only advanced once from Heat 1; in the 500m.
