= Malaysia at the 2017 Winter Universiade =

- IOC code: MAS
- National federation: Malaysian University Sports Council
- Website: www.masum.org.my

in Almaty, Kazakhstan 28 January–8 February 2017
- Competitors: 1 in 1 sport
- Medals: Gold 0 Silver 0 Bronze 0 Total 0

Winter Universiade appearances (overview)
- 2011; 2013–2015; 2017; 2019; 2023; 2025

Malaysia competed at the 2017 Winter Universiade in Almaty, Kazakhstan.

== Short track speed skating ==
Athlete	Event	Heat		Semi-final		Final	
Athlete	Event	Time	Rank	Time	Rank	Time	Rank
Wong De Vin	Men's 1500 m	2:42.530	4	did not advance			

== See also ==
- Malaysia at the 2017 Summer Universiade
