= Athletics at the 2025 Summer World University Games – Men's 10,000 metres =

Men's 10,000 metres at the 2025 Summer World University Games
- Venue: Lohrheidestadion
- Location: Bochum, Germany
- Dates: 23 July
- Competitors: 27 from 17 nations
- Winning time: 28:42.39 SB

Medalists
| gold medal | Brian Musau | Kenya |
| silver medal | David Mullarkey | Great Britain |
| bronze medal | Mario Priego | Spain |

The men's 10,000 metres event at the 2025 Summer World University Games was held in Bochum, Germany, at Lohrheidestadion on 23 July.

== Records ==
Prior to the competition, the records were as follows:

| Record | Athlete (nation) | Time (s) | Location | Date |
|---|---|---|---|---|
| Games record | Stephan Freigang (GER) | 28:15.84 | Sheffield, United Kingdom | 20 July 1991 |

== Results ==
| Place | Athlete | Nation | Time | Notes |
|---|---|---|---|---|
| 1st place, gold medalist(s) | Brian Musau | Kenya | 28:42.39 | SB |
| 2nd place, silver medalist(s) | David Mullarkey | Great Britain | 28:43.44 | |
| 3rd place, bronze medalist(s) | Mario Priego | Spain | 28:45.02 | PB |
| 4 | Kelvin Kimtai Chepsigor | Kenya | 28:46.45 | PB |
| 5 | Ramazan Baştuğ | Turkey | 28:47.72 | |
| 6 | Wenjie Wang | China | 28:54.48 | |
| 7 | Antonin Saint-Peyre | France | 28:59.57 | |
| 8 | Miguel Baidal | Spain | 29:02.24 | |
| 9 | Thomas Termote | France | 29:10.19 | |
| 10 | Dayton Brown | United States | 29:12.30 | |
| 11 | Rogério Amaral | Portugal | 29:23.90 | |
| 12 | William Aitken | Great Britain | 29:26.22 | SB |
| 13 | Martin Zajíc | Czech Republic | 29:27.49 | |
| 14 | Seth Akampa | Uganda | 29:27.56 | SB |
| 15 | Ömer Amaçtan | Turkey | 29:38.87 | |
| 16 | Matre Kiran | India | 29:49.90 | |
| 17 | Isaac Hirshman | Great Britain | 29:54.81 | |
| 18 | Lukas Ehrle | Germany | 29:55.97 | |
| 19 | Azat Demi̇rtaş | Turkey | 30:44.66 | |
| 20 | Tom Hoogeboom | Netherlands | 30:55.93 | |
| 21 | Luke Taylor | United States | 31:08.57 | |
| 22 | Joaquin Santiago Ponce | Ecuador | 31:12.48 | PB |
| 23 | Mark Mahinay | Philippines | 31:29.38 | PB |
| 24 | Mushota Lengwe | Zambia | 32:24.13 | |
| 25 | Abhishek Kamanna | India | 33:46.77 | |
| 26 | Trilok Kumar | India | 36:00.27 | |
| — | Toby Gualter | New Zealand | DQ | TR 17.2.4 |
