= Athletics at the 2025 Summer World University Games – Men's 5000 metres =

Men's 5000 metres at the 2025 Summer World University Games
- Venue: Lohrheidestadion
- Location: Bochum, Germany
- Dates: 24 July (heats); 26 July (final)
- Competitors: 34 from 28 nations
- Winning time: 15:02.00

Medalists
gold medal	Arthur Gervais	France
silver medal	David Mullarkey	Great Britain
bronze medal	Collins Kiprotich	Kenya

The men's 5000 metres event at the 2025 Summer World University Games was held in Bochum, Germany, at Lohrheidestadion on 24 and 26 July.

== Records ==
Prior to the competition, the records were as follows:

Record	Athlete (nation)	Time (s)	Location	Date
Games record	Hayle Ibrahimov (AZE)	13:35.89	Kazan, Russia	12 July 2013

== Results ==
=== Heats ===
First 8 in each heat (Q) qualified for the final.

==== Heat 1 ====
Place	Athlete	Nation	Time	Notes
1	Arthur Gervais	France	14:07.99	Q
2	Thomas Laviolette	Canada	14:08.34	Q
3	Toby Gualter	New Zealand	14:08.95	Q
4	Marcel Tobler	Austria	14:09.24	Q
5	Collins Kiprotich	Kenya	14:09.66	Q
6	Jonathan Harris	Australia	14:10.49	Q
7	Oliver Smart	Great Britain	14:10.93	Q
8	Adrian de la Orden	Spain	14:12.65	Q
9	Olefile Kooagile	Botswana	14:15.72	PB
10	Jesper Sandberg	Sweden	14:15.82	PB
11	Gagan Singh	India	14:22.20	
12	Lucas Martín Jiménez	Ecuador	14:34.99	PB
13	Szymon Skalski	Poland	14:40.17	
14	Francisco Zufiaurre	Argentina	14:50.90	PB
15	Matija Rizmal	Slovenia	15:14.58	
16	Mark Mahinay	Philippines	15:17.53	PB
17	Mushota Lengwe	Zambia	15:39.12	
—	Maxim Frolowskij	Kazakhstan	DNF	

==== Heat 2 ====
Place	Athlete	Nation	Time	Notes
1	Andrii Atamaniuk	Ukraine	14:41.26	Q
2	Matre Kiran	India	14:41.49	Q
3	David Mullarkey	Great Britain	14:42.01	Q
4	Vid Botolin	Slovenia	14:42.20	Q
5	Kobe Hermans	Belgium	14:42.42	Q
6	Kidus Begashaw	United States	14:42.66	Q
7	Christopher May	Mexico	14:42.79	Q
8	Thomas Termote	France	14:43.36	Q
9	Liam Back	New Zealand	14:46.05	
10	Vetle Farbu-Solbakken	Norway	14:48.41	
11	Nathan Houwaard	Netherlands	14:56.43	
12	Jakob Vase	Denmark	14:59.27	
13	Daniel Stiven Herrera	Colombia	15:02.12	
14	William Boyle	Canada	15:07.23	
15	Oliver Annus	Estonia	15:16.96	
16	Juan Pablo Gelmi	Chile	15:52.27	

=== Final ===
Place	Athlete	Nation	Time	Notes
1st place, gold medalist(s)	Arthur Gervais	France	15:02.00	
2nd place, silver medalist(s)	David Mullarkey	Great Britain	15:02.39	
3rd place, bronze medalist(s)	Collins Kiprotich	Kenya	15:02.47	
4	Andrii Atamaniuk	Ukraine	15:02.48	
5	Marcel Tobler	Austria	15:02.79	
6	Kobe Hermans	Belgium	15:02.93	
7	Thomas Termote	France	15:03.79	
8	Adrian de la Orden	Spain	15:04.29	
9	Thomas Laviolette	Canada	15:04.32	
10	Vid Botolin	Slovenia	15:04.48	
11	Kidus Begashaw	United States	15:04.84	
12	Jonathan Harris	Australia	15:04.91	
13	Toby Gualter	New Zealand	15:05.00	
14	Oliver Smart	Great Britain	15:06.37	
15	Christopher May	Mexico	15:14.58	
16	Matre Kiran	India	15:16.57	
