= Graham Lim =

- 林剛陵
- Born: Graham Chua Lim; February 7, 1957 (age 69); Manila, Philippines
- Citizenship: Unclear (see below)
- Occupation: Sports executive

Graham Chua Lim (林剛陵) is a sports executive active in the Philippine sports.

He is the secretary general of the Basketball Association of the Philippines which was the Philippines' national body recognized by FIBA until 2007. He is also the secretary general in Federation of School Sports Association of the Philippines (FESSAP), which is the Philippines' representative body at the International University Sports Federation (FISU).

Born in Manila, Philippines with Chinese ancestry, the validity of Lim's Philippine citizenship was challenged in 2003 leading to his deportation in 2012. His issue was reportedly "resolved" in 2016 which allegedly made a return to the Philippines possible.

== Early life ==
According to Bureau of Immigration (BI) records, Graham Chua Lim (林剛陵) was born on February 7, 1957 in Manila, Philippines reportedly to Chinese parents, How Ang Lim and Mary Lim Chua. Lim however said that his mother was from Tuguegarao. Lim was born while the 1935 Constitution was active meaning, if he was born to a non-Filipino father and a Filipino mother, he can only elect to have Philippine citizenship upon reaching age 18.

== Career ==
=== Basketball Association of the Philippines ===
Lim was secretary general of the Basketball Association of the Philippines (BAP). The Philippine Olympic Committee (POC) under President Peping Cojuangco expelled the BAP from its membership in 2005.This caused FIBA to suspend the Philippines. BAP was supplanted by the Samahang Basketbol ng Pilipinas as the FIBA-recognized national sports associtation for basketball in 2007 BAP remained an extant organization.

=== FESSAP ===
Lim is also the secretary-general of the Federation of School Sports Association of the Philippines (FESSAP) which was recognized by International University Sports Federation (FISU) since 2009 and hence sends the Philippines' delegation to the Universiade. The University Athletic Association of the Philippines (UAAP) with support from POC President Cojuangco attempted to regain recognition from FISU. FISU recognized FESSAP over the UAAP in 2014.

Lim is still FESSAP secretary general as of 2025, with his organization still sending delegation to the international tournament now known as the FISU World University Games.

== Personal life ==
Graham Lim is married to Racquel P. Lim. He has two children.

== Citizenship issue ==
Lim has maintained he is a citizen of the Philippines. In 2003, a case was filed against Lim for allegedly misrepresenting himself as a Philippine citizen despite holding Chinese citizenship. Lim allegedly only sought naturalization on March 17, 1994 with the petition dismissed for lack of interest after a year. Lim was also claimed to have acquired a Philippine passport, despite this, through fraudulent means in 1991. His Philippine passport was cancelled on October 2003 after he was allegedly found to have Chinese citizenship. In 2005, the BI ordered Lim's deportation on the account of having Taiwanese citizenship with an appeal rejected in 2007.

Lim was arrested at least twice on account of his pending deportation; first by the BI on March 24, 2006., and the second was on December 7, 2009 at the Makati City Hall. He filed a petition for bail on the following year claiming that he is a stateless person citing correspondence claiming that Taiwan is in no position to receive him.

Justice Secretary Leila de Lima ordered Lim's immediate deportation. After a failed appeal, Lim went to Singapore with his wife filing a petition against de Lima's orders. In April 2016, the Court of Appeals declared de Lima's orders as valid. He has been alternatively living in Singapore and Malaysia during his exile.

The citizenship issue was reportedly "resolved" by 2016, and Lim was due to return to the Philippines after being deported.
