= Philippines at the 2017 Summer Universiade =

- IOC code: PHI
- National federation: Federation of School Sports Association of the Philippines

in Taipei, Taiwan 19 August 2017 – 30 August 2017
- Competitors: 116 (65 men and 51 women) in 13 sports
- Medals Ranked 53rd: Gold 0 Silver 1 Bronze 0 Total 1

Summer Universiade appearances (overview)
- 1965; 1967; 1970–1985; 1987; 1989; 1991; 1993; 1995; 1997; 1999; 2001; 2003; 2005; 2007; 2009; 2011; 2013; 2015; 2017; 2019; 2021; 2025; 2027

The Philippines participated at the 2017 Summer Universiade in Taipei, Taiwan, from 19 to 30 August 2017.

University of Baguio student and wushu practitioner, Jomar Balangui won a silver medal in the men’s sanda 52-kg event which is the sole medal for the Philippines in this edition of the Universiade.

== Medal summary ==
Medal	Name	Sport	Event
Silver	Jomar Balangui	Wushu	Men’s sanda 52-kg

== Team ==
Competitors from the Philippines per sport
Sport	Men	Women	Total
Archery	3	3	6
Athletics	9	6	15
Badminton	6	6	12
Billiards	2	0	2
Diving	0	1	1
Golf	3	0	3
Judo	4	2	6
Swimming	18	19	37
Table tennis	5	5	10
Taekwondo	4	1	5
Tennis	4	4	8
Weightlifting	3	1	4
Wushu	4	3	7
Total	65	51	116
