= Philippines at the 2019 Summer Universiade =

- IOC code: PHI
- National federation: Federation of School Sports Association of the Philippines

in Naples, Italy 3 July 2019 – 14 July 2019
- Medals: Gold 1 Silver 0 Bronze 0 Total 1

Summer Universiade appearances (overview)
- 1965; 1967; 1970–1985; 1987; 1989; 1991; 1993; 1995; 1997; 1999; 2001; 2003; 2005; 2007; 2009; 2011; 2013; 2015; 2017; 2019; 2021; 2025; 2027

The Philippines participated at the 2019 Summer Universiade in Naples, Italy, from 3 to 14 July 2019.

Federation of School Sports Association of the Philippines Board Chairman Alvin Tai Lian served as the chef de mission of the Philippine delegation to the games.

EJ Obiena won a gold medal for the Philippines by besting the men's pole vault event.

== Medal summary ==
Medal	Name	Sport	Event
Gold	EJ Obiena	Athletics	Men's pole vault
