= Arena Yenisey =

- Interactive map of Arena Yenisey
- Address: Yunost st., 18
- Location: Krasnoyarsk, Russia
- Coordinates: 56.0181°N 92.9796°E
- Owner: KGAU "Arena Yenisey"

Construction
- Opened: 1971 (outdoor), 2018 (indoor)

Tenant
- Yenisey

Arena Yenisey, (Russian: Арена "Енисей") formerly known as the Yenisey Stadium is a former outdoor sports venue in Krasnoyarsk, which in December 2018 was reopened as an indoor arena. It is the home of Yenisey. At the 2019 Winter Universiade the new indoor stadium hosted bandy matches. It held the 2026 Russian Super Cup finale.

Video of the building process
