= Brian Musau =

Kenyan long-distance runner (born 2002)

Personal information
- Full name: Brian Muange Musau
- Nationality: Kenyan
- Born: 29 December 2002 (age 23)

Sport
- Sport: Athletics
- Events: Long distance running, Cross country running

Achievements and titles
- Personal bests: 3000m: 7:45.79 (Lubbock, 2025); 5000m: 12:59.82 (Los Angeles, 2025)
Medal record
Men's athletics
Representing Kenya
Summer World University Games
Gold medal – first place	2025 Bochum	10,000 metres

Brian Muange Musau (born 29 December 2002) is a Kenyan long-distance runner. He won the men's 5000 metres at the NCAA Indoor Championships and NCAA Outdoor Championships in 2025.

== Biography ==
In 2023, 2024 and 2025, he won the Big 12 Cross Country Championships. He finished in fourth place in the men's 5,000 meters at the 2024 NCAA Outdoor Championships in a time of 13:57.42.

He won the men's 5000 meters at the NCAA Indoor Championship on 14 March 2025 in Virginia Beach. He won in a meet-record time of 13:11.34 which included covering the final 200 meters in 25.82 seconds to set the record. He became the first runner from Oklahoma State University to win the title.

In June 2025, he won the 5000 metres at the NCAA Outdoor Championships in Eugene, Oregon, running 13:20.59. He ran a personal best for the 5000 metres to win at the Sunset Tour Los Angeles on 12 July 2025, with a time of 12:59.82. He won the gold medal in the 10,000 metres race at the 2025 Summer World University Games in Bochum, Germany.

On 22 November, he placed fourth at the 2025 NCAA Cross Country Championships in Missouri, and won the team title with Oklahoma State. In May, he ran 13:38.18 for the 5000 m at the West Regionals to qualify for the 2026 NCAA Outdoor Championships, where he placed sixth in the 5000 metres.
