= Taekwondo at the 2007 Summer Universiade =

Taekwondo competition

Taekwondo at the XXVIII Summer Universiade
- Venue: Thammasat University, Gymnasium 6
- Dates: August 9, 2007 – August 13, 2007

The Taekwondo competition in the 2007 Summer Universiade were held in Bangkok, Thailand.

== Medal overview ==
=== Men ===
Weight	Gold	Silver	Bronze
54 kg	(Thailand) Chutchawal Khawlaor	(South Korea) Lee Woolinara	(Belarus) Ihar Leanovich (Turkey) Ayhan Kurt
58 kg	(South Korea) Lim In-Mook	(Thailand) Dech Sutthikunkarn	(France) Arnaud Sangue (Italy) Diego Redina
62 kg	(South Korea) Kim Yong-Min	(Thailand) Nacha Punthong	(Iran) Navid Sajjadi (Russia) Dmitry Frank
67 kg	(Iran) Mohammad Bagheri	(Chinese Taipei) Tseng Ching-Hsiang	(Vietnam) Nguyen Minh Hieu (South Korea) Lee Kang-Seok
72 kg	(Thailand) Patiwat Thongsalap	(Iran) Alireza Nasr Azadani	(Spain) Aritz Ichisoa (France) Torann Maizeroi
78 kg	(Iran) Rouhollah Talebi	(South Korea) Hwang Dae-Sung	(Chinese Taipei) Hung Chun-An (Armenia) Arman Yeremyan
84 kg	(Iran) Yousef Karami	(Russia) Ismail Musaev	(Turkey) Ali Sari (Italy) Mauro Sarmiento
+84 kg	(South Korea) Heo Jung-Nyoung	(Italy) Leonardo Basile	(Iran) Morteza Rostami (Mexico) Salvador Perez

=== Women ===
Weight	Gold	Silver	Bronze
47 kg	(Thailand) Mae-Num Chirdkiatisak	(China) Li Dan	(Spain) Elaia Torrontegui (South Korea) Lee Eun-Me
51 kg	(South Korea) Kwon Eun-Kyung	(Thailand) Yaowapa Boorapolchai	(Turkey) Özge Gök (Mexico) Jannet Alegria
55 kg	(Chinese Taipei) Tseng Yi-Hsuan	(United States) Jesika Torres	(Belarus) Yuliya Smychkova (South Korea) Jung Jin-Hee
59 kg	(South Korea) Lim Su-Jeong	(Thailand) Chonnapas Premwaew	(Chinese Taipei) Hsiao Wan-Tien (Mexico) Carolina Acosta
63 kg	(Chinese Taipei) Su Li-Wen	(Croatia) Josipa Kusanic	(South Korea) Hwang Hye-Mi (Netherlands) Joyce Van Baaren
67 kg	(Chinese Taipei) Lin An-Ni	(Turkey) Sibel Güler	(Kazakhstan) Liya Nurkina (Australia) Caroline Marton
72 kg	(South Korea) Jung Sun-Young	(Malaysia) Che Chew Chan	(Philippines) Ma Criselda Roxas (Chinese Taipei) Chen Yen-Ju
+72 kg	(South Korea) Hyun Kyoung-Hwa	(Spain) Leire Herboso	(Australia) Yoo Hyo Rowe (United States) Amie Szymanski

== Medal table ==
* Host nation (Thailand)

Rank	Nation	Gold	Silver	Bronze	Total
1	South Korea	7	2	4	13
2	Thailand*	3	4	0	7
3	Chinese Taipei	3	1	3	7
4	Iran	3	1	2	6
5	Turkey	0	1	3	4
6	Italy	0	1	2	3
6	Spain	0	1	2	3
8	Russia	0	1	1	2
8	United States	0	1	1	2
10	China	0	1	0	1
10	Croatia	0	1	0	1
10	Malaysia	0	1	0	1
13	Mexico	0	0	3	3
14	Australia	0	0	2	2
14	Belarus	0	0	2	2
14	France	0	0	2	2
17	Armenia	0	0	1	1
17	Kazakhstan	0	0	1	1
17	Netherlands	0	0	1	1
17	Philippines	0	0	1	1
17	Vietnam	0	0	1	1
Totals (21 entries)		16	16	32	64
