= Deng Yu-cheng =

Taiwanese archer (born 1999)

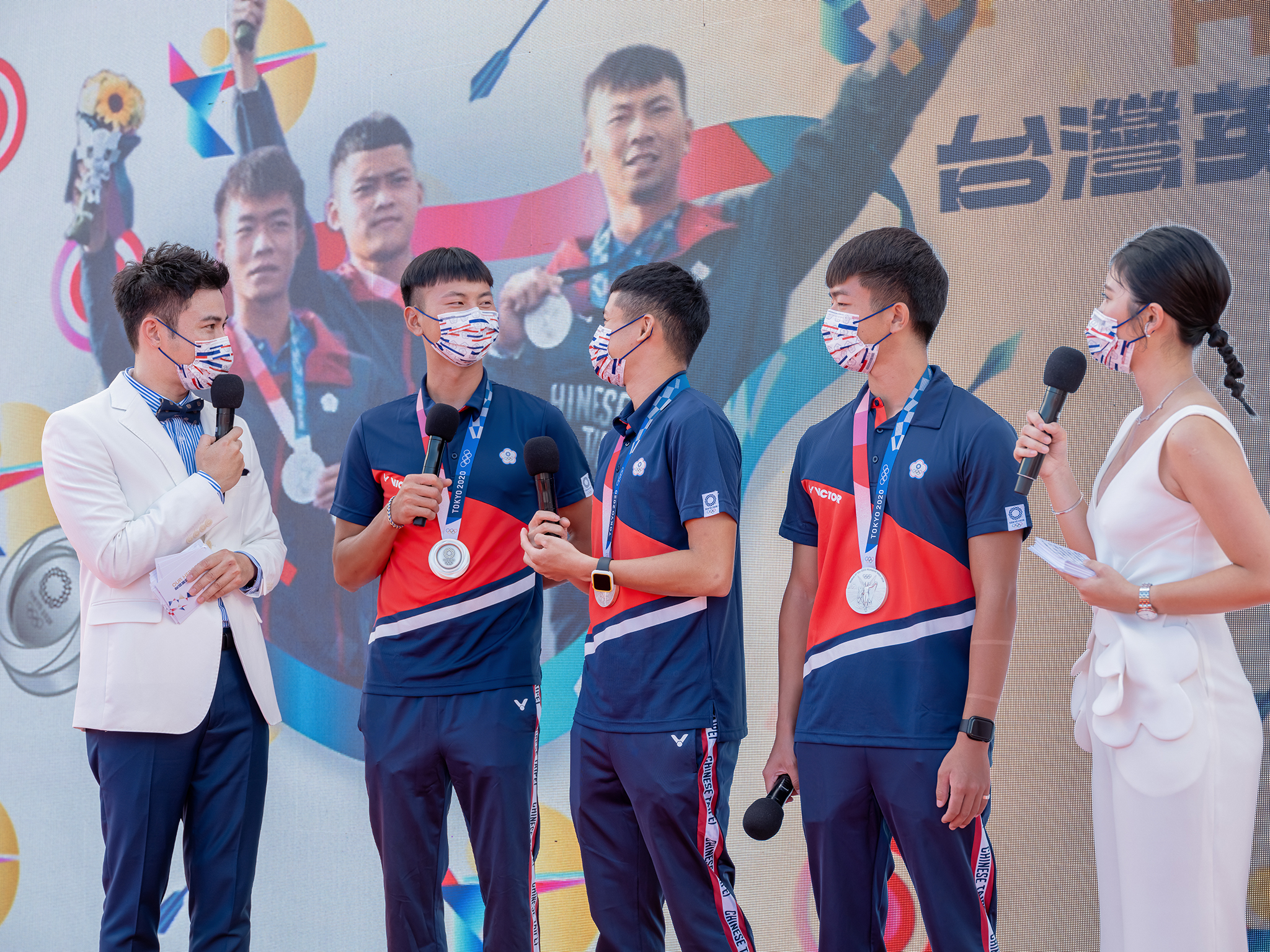
- Taiwanese archers Wei Chun-heng, Tang Chih-Chun and Deng Yu-cheng (2021)

Personal information
- Nationality: Taiwanese
- Born: 25 April 1999 (age 27) Taipei City

Sport
- Country: Taiwan
- Sport: Archery
Medal record
Men's recurve archery
Representing Chinese Taipei
Olympic Games
| Silver medal – second place | 2020 Tokyo | Team |
Summer Universiade
| Silver medal – second place | 2017 Taipei | Team |

Deng Yu-cheng (born 25 April 1999) is a Taiwanese archer. He competed with Wei Chun-heng and Peng Shih-Cheng in the 2017 Summer Universiade and won silver in the Recurve Men's Team event. He competed in the men's individual event and also won silver in the men's team event at the 2020 Summer Olympics.
