= Galsan Bazarzhapov =

Russian archer (born 1994)

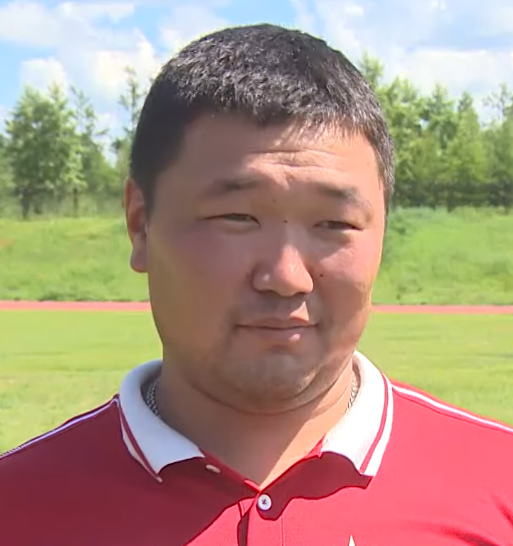

Personal information
- Full name: Galsan Belikovich Bazarzhapov
- Nationality: Russian
- Born: 1 November 1994 (age 31) Zugalay, Zabaykalsky Krai, Russia

Sport
- Sport: Archery
- Event: recurve
Medal record
Men's archery
Representing Russian Archery Federation
World Championships
| Silver medal – second place | 2021 Yankton | Mixed team |
Representing Russia
European Championships
| Silver medal – second place | 2021 Antalya | Individual |
| Silver medal – second place | 2021 Antalya | Team |
Summer Universiade
| Bronze medal – third place | 2015 Gwangju | Team |
| Bronze medal – third place | 2015 Gwangju | Mixed team |
| Bronze medal – third place | 2017 Taipei | Team |

Galsan Belikovich Bazarzhapov (Russian: Галсан Бэликович Базаржапов; born 1 November 1994) is a Russian recurve archer. He competed in the men's individual and in the mixed event with Ksenia Perova at the 2020 Summer Olympics.

In the world rankings, Bazarzhapov's career best result in Men's Recurve Archery was 2nd, which he achieved on 12 July 2021.
