= 2019 Winter Universiade =

Multi-sport event in Krasnoyarsk, Russia

XXIX Winter Universiade XXIX Зимняя Универсиада
- Host city: Krasnoyarsk, Russia
- Motto: "Real Winter" "Welcome to Winter" "100% Winter"
- Nations: 58
- Athletes: 3000
- Events: 76 in 11 sports
- Opening: 2 March 2019
- Closing: 12 March 2019
- Opened by: President Vladimir Putin
- Torch lighter: Svetlana Khorkina and Sergey Lomanov
- Main venue: Platinum Arena (Ice Arena)
- Website: krsk2019.com (archived)

Winter

Summer

The 2019 Winter Universiade (Russian: Зимняя Универсиада 2019), the XXIX Winter Universiade, was a multi-sport event for student and youth athletes which took place from 2 to 12 March 2019 in the Russian city of Krasnoyarsk. The 2019 Winter Universiade was the third Universiade hosted in Russia and second as an independent country. The first Universiade, when Russia was a Soviet Republic, was hosted by Moscow in 1973, whereas Kazan, capital of the Republic of Tatarstan, hosted the 2013 Summer Universiade. It is the first Winter Universiade hosted by Russia, and the second time that the event was held in a former USSR republic (the other being the 2017 Universiade in Almaty).

Krasnoyarsk was unanimously elected as the host city of the 29th Winter Universiade 2019 by an executive committee meeting in Brussels on 9 November 2013. At the opening ceremony the fire was lit by two of the event's ambassadors, bandy player Sergey Lomanov and former artistic gymnast Svetlana Khorkina.

For the first time in Universiade history, bandy and ski-orienteering were included as optional sports. Bandy had bigger spectator crowds than any other sport. The budget of the 2019 Universiade in Krasnoyarsk was 67.8 billion rubles (1.021 billion US dollars): 43.3 billion rubles from the federal budget, 24.5 billion rubles from the budget of the Krasnoyarsk Krai. Russia won a record 41 gold and 112 overall medals, while South Korea placed second with 6 and 14, respectively. Japan was third, winning 5 gold and 13 overall medals.

== Bidding campaign and host city selection ==
On 1 September 2012, the bidding campaign for the right to host the 2019 Winter and Summer Universiades was launched. On the same day, the Russian Students Sport Union (RSSU) sent a letter to the president of the International University Sports Federation (FISU), Mr. Claude-Louis Galen, about Krasnoyarsk's intention to apply for the right to host the Winter Universiade 2019. The choice of the city was primarily determined by the desire and capability of the territory of Krasnoyarsk to host the University Games. The capital of the Krasnoyarsk Krai, it is one of the country's student centres with the Siberian Federal University located there.

On 3 April 2013, FISU, officially confirmed two candidate cities:

- Krasnoyarsk, Krasnoyarsk Krai, Russia
- Canton of Valais, Switzerland

During the whole year, each applicant worked on the preparation of application dossier. On 14 September 2013, Krasnoyarsk presented its Bidding Book at the FISU headquarters and received the status of a candidate city. The only competitor at this stage, the Canton of Valais, withdrew from candidacy.

On 9 November 2013, in Brussels, FISU members elected Krasnoyarsk as the host city of the 29th Winter Universiade 2019 by a closed vote.

== Brands ==
=== Logo ===
In accordance with the requirements of the International University Sports Federation (FISU), the logo of the Winter Universiade 2019 was made based on the Latin letter "U" – the first letter of the word "Universiade", with the city name in English and the year the Games take place – Krasnoyarsk 2019, the sequence number and the name of the event in English – 29th Winter Universiade, as well as 5 stars in blue, yellow, black, green and red colors – elements of the FISU logo.

The "U" letter in the logo of the Winter Universiade Krasnoyarsk 2019 symbolizes the ice block, the irregular facets of which demonstrate the severe character of Siberian nature, peaks of rocks and snow-covered slopes.

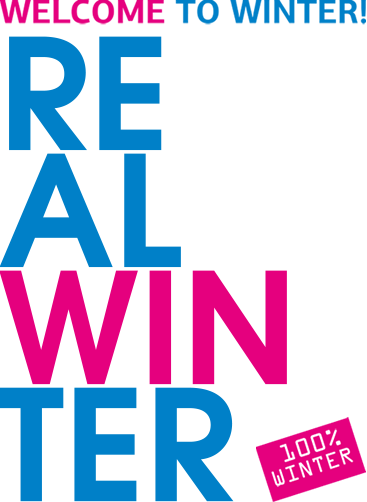

=== Slogans ===
The main slogan of the Games was "Настоящая зима" or "Real Winter," revealing the essence of the Winter Universiade 2019 idea. It is not accidental that the first Winter Universiade in Russia took place in 2019 in Krasnoyarsk – the geographical center of Siberia. Russia is the biggest country in the world by area, with long and severe winters on the most part of its territory. Foreigners often associate Russia with "frost" and "winter."

Two additional slogans were officially used: "100% зима" or "100% Winter," which was used together with any of the slogans or independently as a chevron, stripe or patch on clothes; and "Добро пожаловать в зиму!" or "Welcome to Winter!," which was used in advertising campaigns.

=== Mascot ===
The official mascot of the Winter Universiade 2019 is "U-Laika", a Siberian dog of the Laika breed, a symbol of loyalty, friendliness, joy and unbridled energy.

==== Countdown Clock ====
On 5 June 2016, the countdown clock of the Winter Universiade 2019 was launched on the Yenisei river embankment in Krasnoyarsk. The countdown started from 1,000 days. The screen shows the exact number of days, hours, minutes and seconds before the official opening ceremony of the Games in Krasnoyarsk.

On 18 October 2017, 500 days until the start of the Winter Universiade 2019, the countdown clock of the University Games was unveiled with the participation of Russian Minister of Sport Pavel Kolobkov, acting Chairman of the Regional Government Viktor Tomenko, Director General of the executive directorate of the 29th Winter Universiade 2019 Maxim Urazov, and Ambassadors of the Winter Universiade 2019 Svetlana Khorkina, Ilia Averbukh and Zlata Demyanova. The clock became the second art object of the Winter Universiade 2019 in Krasnoyarsk, and a new attraction site of the Funpark Bobrovy Log.

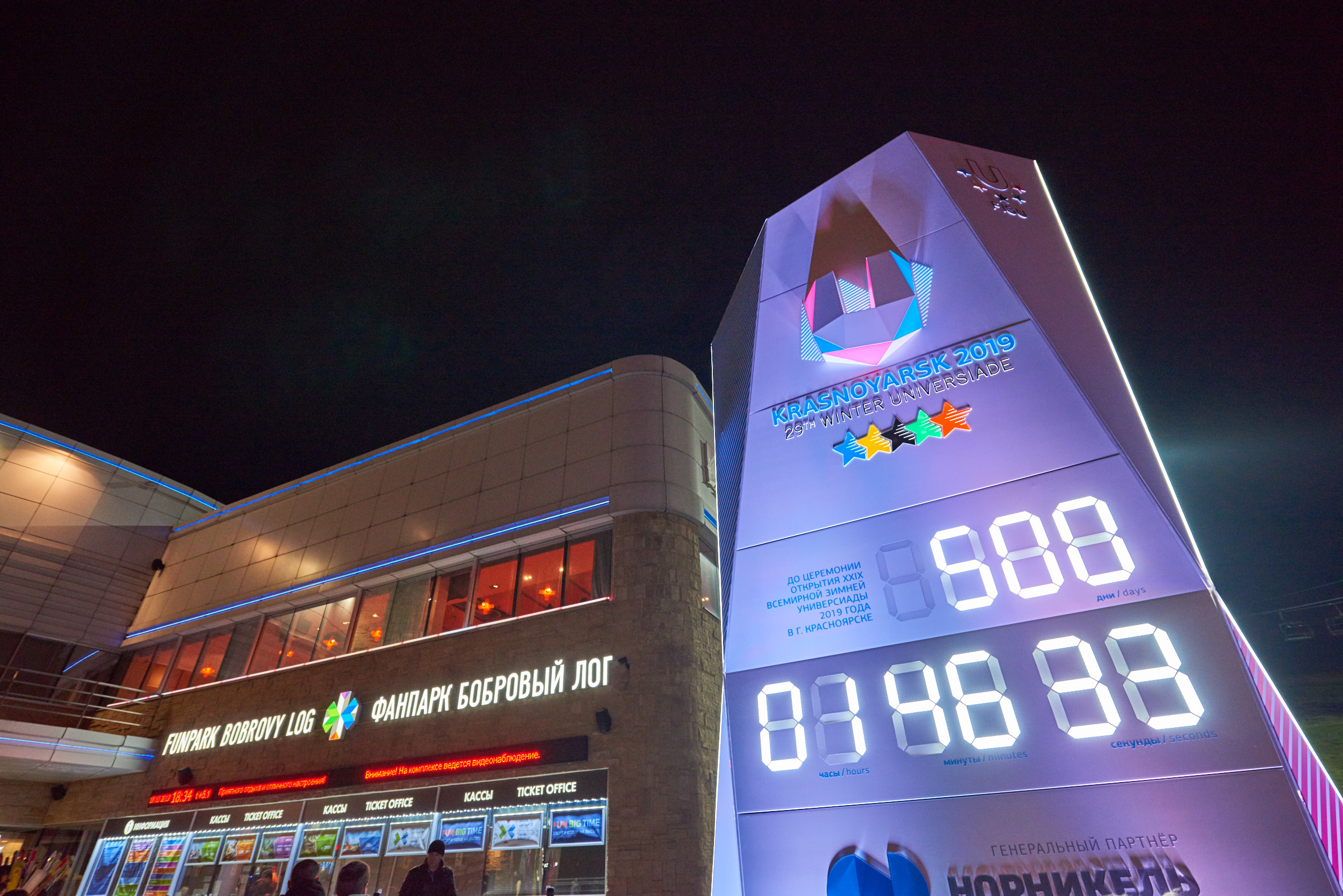
500 days before the start of the 29th Winter Universiade 2019

== Preparation ==
The management system of the Winter Universiade 2019 consists of four main levels: Organising Committee, Executive Directorate, Supervisory Board, Coordinating Council.

The budget of the 2019 Universiade in Krasnoyarsk equalled 67.8 billion rubles (1.021 billion US dollars): 43.3 billion rubles from the federal budget and 24.5 billion rubles from the budget of the Krasnoyarsk Krai.

=== Organising Committee ===
The Organising Committee for the preparation and delivery of the 2019 Winter Universiade was created by the Resolution of the Government of the Russian Federation from 18 February 2014, No. 219.

Initially the Organising Committee was headed by the Deputy Prime Minister of Russia Vitaly Mutko. He was replaced by Olga Golodets in December 2018.

The Organising Committee was formed by representatives of the state authorities of the Russian Federation and the Krasnoyarsk Krai. The Organizing Committee made important decisions regarding the Universiade organization and preparation; it approved the plan of organizational measures and the list of the Winter Universiade 2019 venues.

The organizational and technical support of the Organising Committee was entrusted to the Ministry of Sport.

== Venues ==
The list of main venues was approved by the Organizing Committee of the Winter Universiade 2019.

=== Universiade Village ===
The Universiade Village located on the territory of the campus of the Siberian Federal University, close to Nikolayevskaya Sopka and most alpine skiing venues:

- The Universitetsky Residential Complex allows more than 3,000 beds to be placed on the territory of the Universiade Village for athletes and accredited persons, taking into account the pre-existing housing infrastructure of University campus.
- The FSAEI HPO Siberian Federal University multifunctional center consists of a training block and sports block with a food production facility, gymnastic training halls with transportable stands for spectators with up to 200 seats each, with the possibility of transforming one gym into a dining room for 700 seats. In addition, there is a sports hall for athletes to train and warm-up at the venue.
- The Perya Residential Complex accommodates more than 1,700 beds for volunteers and support personnel close to the Universiade Village.

=== Sports venues ===
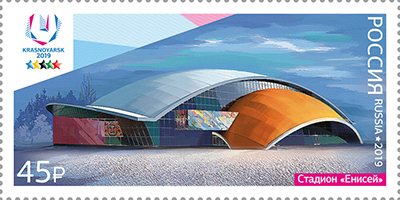
Stamp depicting Yenisey Stadium

Venue	Sports	Capacity	Ref.			
Venue	Sports	Capacity	Ref.	Arena Sever	Ice hockey, Short track speed skating	3,000
Biathlon Academy	Biathlon	106				
Krasnoyarsk Central Stadium	Cultural events	15,000				
Crystal Ice Arena	Ice hockey	3,500				
Funpark Bobrovy Log	Alpine skiing	2,500				
Ivan Yarygin Sports Palace	Curling	3,500				
Pervomaisky Ice Arena	Ice hockey	200				
Platinum Arena	Ceremonies, Figure skating	7,000				
Winter Sports Academy – Raduga Cluster	Cross-country skiing, Ski-orienteering	1,500				
Winter Sports Academy – Sopka Cluster	Freestyle skiing, Snowboarding	3,300				
Yenisey Stadium	Bandy	5,000				

== Sports ==
There were events in eleven sports. Athletes competed for 76 sets of awards in 11 sports: alpine skiing, bandy, biathlon, cross-country skiing, curling, figure skating, freestyle skiing, ice hockey, short track, ski orienteering, snowboarding.

For the first time in Universiade history, bandy and ski-orienteering were included as optional sports. Freestyle skiing was another optional sport at this Universiade.

- Alpine skiing (9)
- Bandy (2)
- Biathlon (9)
- Cross-country skiing (11)
- Curling (2)
- Figure skating (5)
- Freestyle skiing (11)
- Ice hockey (2)
- Ski-orienteering (7)
- Short track speed skating (8)
- Snowboarding (10)

== Schedule ==
OC	Opening ceremony	●	Event competitions	1	Event finals	CC	Closing ceremony

March	1 Fri	2 Sat	3 Sun	4 Mon	5 Tue	6 Wed	7 Thu	8 Fri	9 Sat	10 Sun	11 Mon	12 Tue	Events
Ceremonies		OC										CC	
Alpine skiing			2	1	1		1	1	1	1	1		9
Bandy	●	●	●	●	●	●	●	1	●	1			2
Biathlon				2		2	2		1	2			9
Cross-country skiing			2	2		2		1	2		1	1	11
Curling			●	●	●	●	●	●	●	2			2
Figure skating						●	2	1	2				5
Freestyle skiing			2	1		2			2	2	2		11
Ice hockey	●	●	●	●	●	●	●	●	●	●	1	1	2
Short track speed skating				2	2	4							8
Ski-orienteering				2	2		1			2			7
Snowboarding			2		2	2		2		2			10
Total events			8	10	7	12	6	5	8	13	5	2	76
Cumulative total			8	18	25	37	43	48	56	69	74	76	
March	1 Fri	2 Sat	3 Sun	4 Mon	5 Tue	6 Wed	7 Thu	8 Fri	9 Sat	10 Sun	11 Mon	12 Tue	Events

== Participating nations ==
58 national university sports federations sent at least an athlete for the 2019 Winter Universiade. The Philippines and the United Arab Emirates made their debut in Winter Universiade while Ukraine boycotted the event due to the Ukrainian government refusal to fund Ukrainian athletes competing in tournaments being held in Russia.

- Afghanistan (2)
- Argentina
- Armenia (5)
- Australia
- Austria (10)
- Belarus (22)
- Belgium
- Brazil (2)
- Bulgaria (4)
- Canada (91)
- China (83)
- Croatia
- Czech Republic
- Estonia (13)
- Finland (89)
- France (21)
- Georgia (8)
- Germany (30)
- Great Britain
- Hong Kong (6)
- Hungary
- Iceland (1)
- Indonesia
- Ireland (1)
- Israel
- Italy (2)
- Japan (27)
- Kazakhstan (95)
- Kyrgyzstan
- Latvia (34)
- Lebanon (1)
- Liechtenstein (1)
- Lithuania (6)
- Luxembourg (1)
- Malaysia (1)
- Mexico
- Moldova (2)
- Mongolia
- Nepal
- Netherlands (13)
- Norway
- Philippines (1)
- Poland (11)
- Portugal (1)
- Romania (3)
- Russia (296)
- Serbia (3)
- Slovakia (4)
- Slovenia (3)
- South Korea (15)
- Spain
- Sweden (76)
- Switzerland (19)
- Tajikistan
- Thailand (4)
- Turkey
- United Arab Emirates (1)
- United States
- Uzbekistan (5)

== Medal table ==
* Host nation (Russia)

Rank	Nation	Gold	Silver	Bronze	Total
1	Russia*	41	39	31	111
2	South Korea	6	4	4	14
3	Japan	5	4	4	13
4	Austria	3	3	0	6
5	Finland	3	2	7	12
6	Norway	3	2	3	8
7	France	2	4	7	13
8	Switzerland	2	2	3	7
9	Germany	2	1	2	5
9	Sweden	2	1	2	5
11	Belarus	2	1	0	3
12	Czech Republic	1	2	3	6
13	Canada	1	2	2	5
14	China	1	2	1	4
15	Italy	1	1	1	3
16	Poland	1	1	0	2
17	Kazakhstan	0	4	4	8
18	Slovakia	0	1	0	1
19	Georgia	0	0	1	1
19	Great Britain	0	0	1	1
Totals (20 entries)		76	76	76	228

Russia won a record of 41 gold and 111 overall medals, while South Korea placed second with 6 and 14, respectively. Japan was third, winning 5 gold and 13 overall medals.

== Dedicated stamps ==
On 2 March 2018 four postage stamps from the "29th Winter Universiade 2019 Krasnoyarsk. Sports venues" series were issued by the Russian Post. In addition to sports arenas, each stamp depicts the emblem of the Winter Universiade 2019.

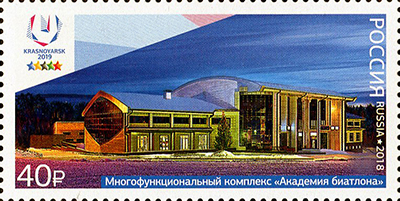
Multi-purpose Complex Biathlon Academy

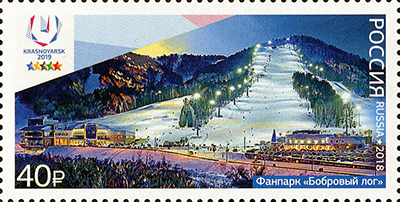
Alpine Skiing Complex Fun Park Bobrovy Log

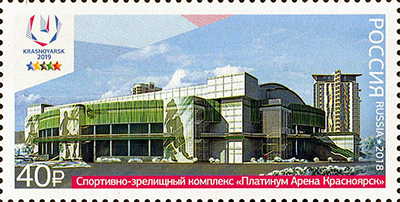
Platinum Arena Ice Arena

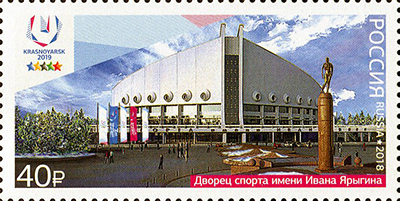
Ivan Yarygin Sports Palace

== Opening ceremony ==
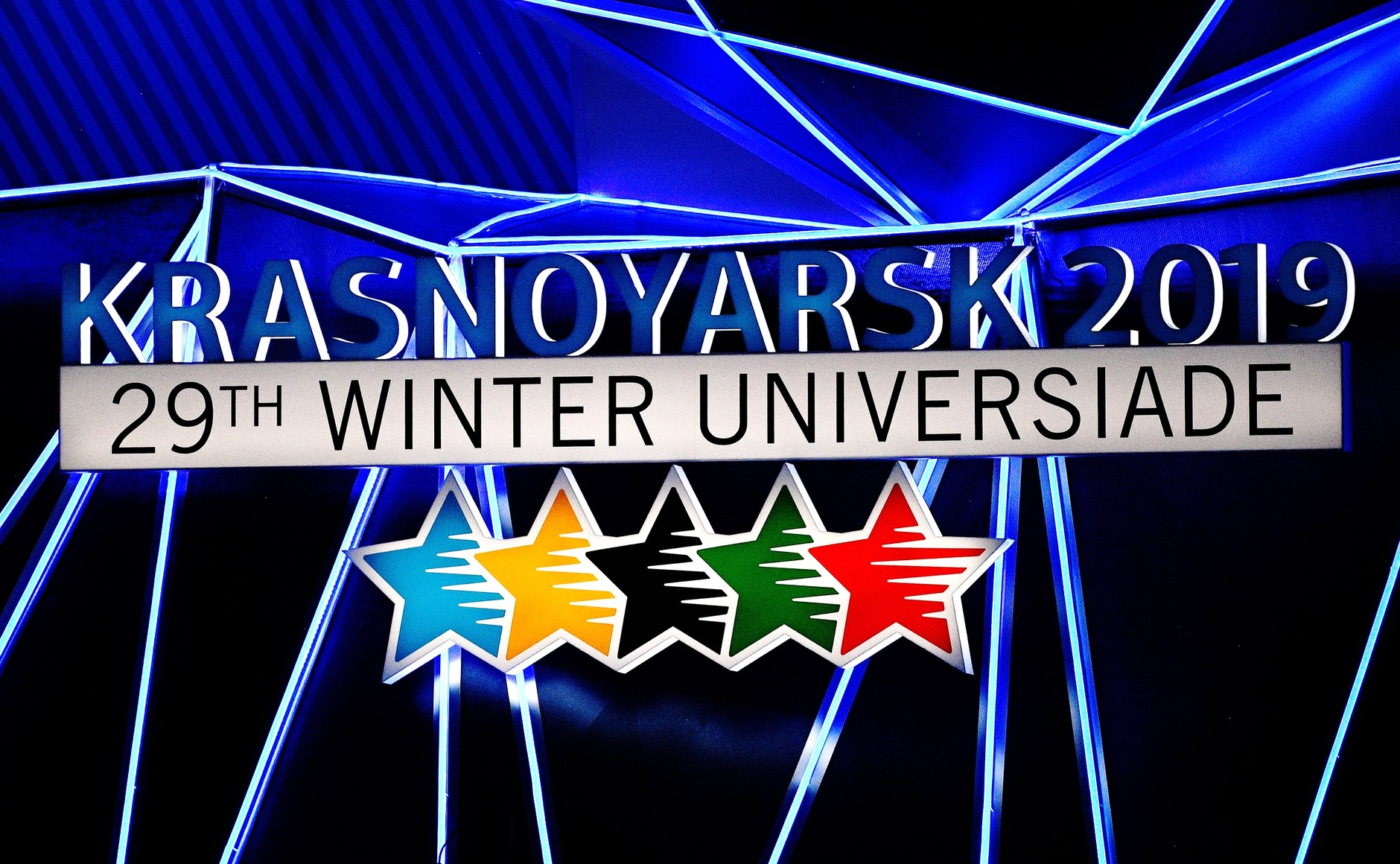

The opening ceremony was held at Platinum Arena and ran from 20:19 to 22:47 pm local time (Krasnoyarsk Time). It was officially opened by President of Russia Vladimir Putin.

The opening ceremony featured scenes with paintings of Vasily Surikov, who was born in Krasnoyarsk. In one of those his "Capture of a Snow Town" was used. The folk song "Valenki" was performed by Nyusha for the upcoming Maslenitsa. Then, singer Zara sang a lullaby on a golden moon. Also in the ceremony famous Siberians such as writer Viktor Astafyev, painter Andrey Pozdeyev and opera singer Dmitry Khvorostovsky were mentioned. The final part featured figure skater Alexei Yagudin.

The fire was lit via a bandy ball, for the first time in history.

== Closing ceremony ==
The closing ceremony was held at the Platinum Arena from 20:00 to 21:30 pm local time (Krasnoyarsk Time) on 12 March 2019 which handed over the FISU flag to what would've been the next host city, Lucerne, Switzerland for the next edition in 2021, but due to COVID-19, that event would be canceled. Therefore, 2021 would be the first year to not host a Winter Universiade, and the next Winter Universiade would be hosted at Lake Placid, USA in 2023
