= Chess at the 2013 Summer Universiade =

Chess at the XXVII Summer Universiade
- Venue: various
- Dates: July 9, 2013 – July 15, 2013

Chess was contested at the 2013 Summer Universiade from July 9 to 15 in Kazan, Russia.

== Medal summary ==
=== Medal table ===
| Rank | Nation | Gold | Silver | Bronze | Total |
|---|---|---|---|---|---|
| 1 | China (CHN) | 2 | 1 | 2 | 5 |
| 2 | Philippines (PHI) | 1 | 0 | 0 | 1 |
| 3 | Armenia (ARM) | 0 | 1 | 0 | 1 |
| 3 | Russia (RUS) | 0 | 1 | 0 | 1 |
| 5 | Poland (POL) | 0 | 0 | 1 | 1 |
| Totals (5 entries) | | 3 | 3 | 3 | 9 |

=== Medal events ===
| Event | Gold | Silver | Bronze |
|---|---|---|---|
| Men's individual | Wesley So; Philippines | Zaven Andriasian; Armenia | Li Chao; China |
| Women's individual | Zhao Xue; China | Ju Wenjun; China | Tan Zhongyi; China |
| Mixed team | China (CHN); Ju Wenjun; Li Chao; Zhao Xue | Russia (RUS); Anastasia Bodnaruk; Maxim Matlakov; Anastasia Savina | Poland (POL); Klaudia Kulon; Wojciech Moranda; Jacek Tomczak |
