= Asia Pacific University Sports Union =

- Abbreviation: APUSU
- Formation: 2016
- Type: Sports federation
- President: (Philippines) Alvin Tai Lian
- Secretary Genera: (Malaysia) Mustaza Ahmad

Asia Pacific University Sports Union (APUSU) is an umbrella organization of university sports associations in the Asia-Pacific region.

== History ==
On April 2, 2016 the first Executive Committee Meeting of the Asia Pacific University Sports Union was held in Bangkok. During the meeting held at the Eastin Sathorn Hotel (APUSU) APUSU Constitution and By-Laws were signed.

== See also ==
- International University Sports Federation
- European University Sports Association
