= Valenki (song) =

"Valenki" is a Russian-language traditional song.

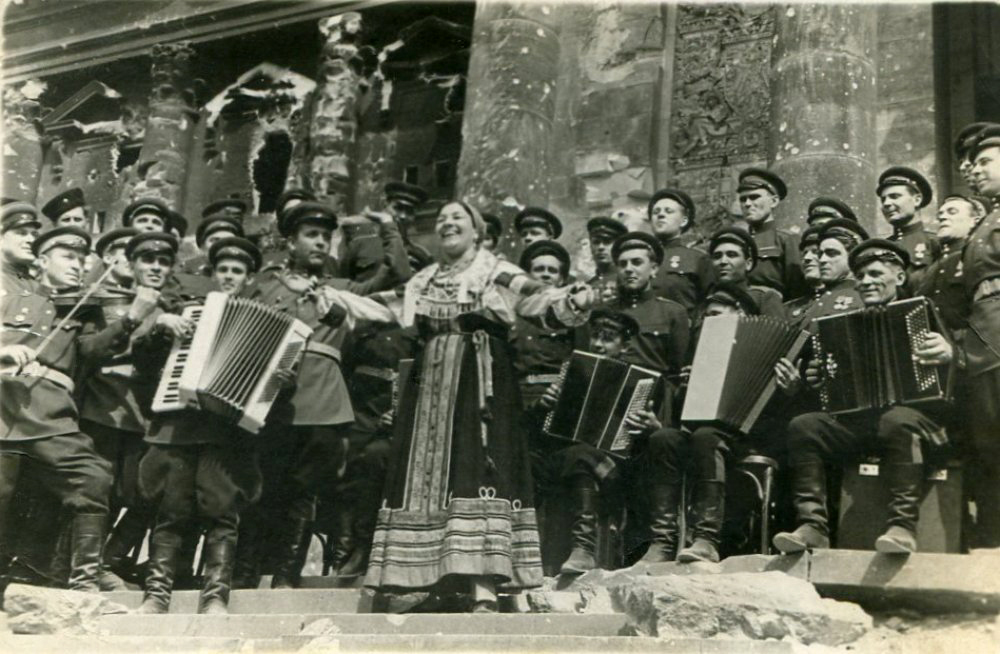
Lidia Ruslanova singing on the steps of the Reichstag

It is commonly known as a Russian folk song and is strongly associated with Russian folk singer Lidia Ruslanova, who presented her version with a new melody during World War II. She sang it at every concert, including on the steps of the Reichstag on 2 May 1945.

The earlier version belonged to the genre of Russian "gypsy dance song" and was thought to originate "somewhere in gypsy camps". Among the performers had been Nina Dulkevich, gypsy singer Nastya Polyakova, and "Queen of Russian Romance" Izabella Yurieva. In fact, Nastya Polyakova is credited as the author on her 1913 gramophone record.
