= Pravin Jadhav =

Indian archer (born 1996)

Personal information
- Full name: Pravin Ramesh Jadhav
- Born: 6 July 1996 (age 29) Satara district, Maharashtra, India

Sport
- Sport: Archery
Medal record
Men's recurve archery
Representing India
World Championships
Silver medal – second place	2019 's-Hertogenbosch	Team
Asian Championships
Silver medal – second place	2021 Dhaka	Team
- Updated on 2 February 2020

Pravin Ramesh Jadhav (born 6 July 1996) is an Indian archer who competes in the recurve discipline. At the 2019 World Archery Championships, he was a member of the first Indian team to qualify for the final since 2005; the team received the silver medal. He made his Olympic debut in Tokyo at the 2020 Summer Olympics and represented India again at the 2024 Summer Olympics in Paris.

== Early life ==
Jadhav was born on 6 July 1996 into a family of daily wage labourers. His family lived in a shack near a drain in the drought-prone village of Sarade in Satara district. Jadhav would sometimes accompany his father to work in the farm, during his teenage years.

Interested in sports from his childhood, Jadhav participated in 800 meters at district level, but did not have enough stamina as a result of being undernourished. His school teacher Vikas Bhujbal then bore the expenses for his training and diet, resulting in better performances and selection in the Krida Parbodhini school. After receiving training for one year in Balewadi, Pune, where his 800 meters timing improved, he shifted to Amravati, where he was trained in archery. Jadhav, still physically weak, experienced difficulty in handling the weight of the recurve bow, with the academy mulling to release him due to his sub-par performances. Bhujbal then requested help from Mahesh Palkar, an education officer, who asked the academy to give Jadhav a final chance. Having been given five shots to prove himself, Jadhav scored over 45 and retained his place in the academy. He is supported by sports NGO Olympic Gold Quest.

== Career ==
Jadhav first represented India at the 2016 Asia Cup Stage 1 in Bangkok, where he won bronze medal in the men's recurve team event. Later that year, he was part of Indian B team in the 2016 Archery World Cup stage in Medellín.

At the 2019 World Archery Championships, Jadhav was a member of the Indian team which became the first men's recurve team from the country to qualify for the final since 2005. The team of Jadhav, Atanu Das and Tarundeep Rai beat sixth-seeded Canada to qualify for the knockout stage and secure India a place at the 2020 Summer Olympics. Then they beat third-seeded Chinese Taipei and hosts Netherlands in the quarterfinals and semifinals respectively. The team settled for silver after losing to China in the final.

== Personal life ==
Jadhav was recruited in the Indian Army under sports quota in 2017, after being spotted by Colonel Vikram Dhayal, coach of the compound team, during the 2016 World Cup. As of 2019, he is ranked havaldar.
