= Sultan Duzelbayev =

Kazakhstani archer (born 1994)

Personal information
- Born: 12 March 1994 (age 32)

Sport
- Country: Kazakhstan
- Sport: Archery
- Event: Recurve
- Updated on 26 July 2016

Sultan Duzelbayev (Султан Тлеугазиевич Дузельбаев, born 12 March 1994) is a male Kazakh recurve archer from Almaty. He competed in the archery competition at the 2016 Summer Olympics in Rio de Janeiro.
