= Federation of School Sports Association of the Philippines =

- Abbreviation: FESSAP
- Type: University sports federation
- Headquarters: Manila, Philippines
- Region served: Philippines
- President: Edwin Fabro
- Secretary General: Graham Lim
- Affiliations: International University Sports Federation (FISU); Asia Pacific University Sports Union (APUSU)
- Website: http://www.fessap.net/

The Federation of School Sports Association of the Philippines, abbreviated as FESSAP is a university sports federation based in the Philippines established in 1999. It is recognized by the Commission on Higher Education since 1999 and member of the International University Sports Federation (FISU) since 2009. The university sports body is the sole recognized body for university sports in the Philippines by FISU. FESSAP is also a member of the Asian University Sports Federation since 2000.

In 2013, the University Athletic Association of the Philippines (UAAP) disputed the membership of FESSAP in FISU. The UAAP asserts that from the 1967 to 2007 the UAAP has been sending athletes to the Universiade, which is organized by FISU. In a meeting by the FISU Executive Committee in Trento, Italy held on December 8, 2013, FESSAP's membership was confirmed by FISU.

== Members ==
- Basketball Association of the Philippines
- Bohol School Amateur Athletic Association
- Bulacan University and Collegiate Athletic Association
- Cavite Athletic Association of the Philippines
- Cebu Schools Athletic Foundation, Inc.
- Cebu Weightlifting Association
- Cheng Hua Athletic Association
- Filipino-Chinese Amateur Athletic Federation
- Laguna Colleges & Universities Athletic Association
- Leyte Amateur Athletic Association
- Metropolitan Amateur Sports Association
- National Capital Region Athletic Association
- National Ladies Beach Volleyball League
- Negros Oriental Colleges Athletic Association
- Philippine Athletics Track and Field Association
- Philippine Federation of Body Builders
- Philippine Inter-School Sport Association
- Philippine Inter-Schools Colleges & Universities Athletic Association
- Philippine Schools Volleyball Association
- Philippine Wushu Colleges & Clubs Association (PWCCA)
- Private Schools Athletic Association
- State Colleges and Universities Athletic Association
- Table Tennis Association for National Development (TATAND)
- Universities & Colleges Athletic Association of Pangasinan
- Zamboanga City Sports Athletic Development Foundation

== See also ==
- Philippine Olympic Committee
- Philippine Sports Commission
