= Swimming at the 2017 Summer Universiade – Men's 100 metre breaststroke =

Men's 100 metre breaststroke at the 2017 Summer Universiade
- Venue: National Taiwan Sport University Arena
- Location: Taipei, Taiwan
- Dates: 20 August (heats and semifinals); 21 August (final)
- Competitors: 66 from 45 nations
- Winning time: 1:00.15

Medalists
gold medal	Ilya Shymanovich	Belarus
gold medal	Andrew Wilson	United States
bronze medal	Dmitriy Balandin	Kazakhstan

The Men's 100 metre breaststroke competition at the 2017 Summer Universiade was held on 20 and 21 August 2017.

== Records ==
Prior to the competition, the existing world and Universiade records were as follows.

World record	Adam Peaty (GBR)	57.13	Rio de Janeiro, Brazil	7 August 2016
Competition record	Ihor Borysyk (UKR)	59.53	Belgrade, Serbia	6 July 2009

== Results ==
=== Heats ===
The heats were held on 20 August at 10:28.

Rank	Heat	Lane	Name	Nationality	Time	Notes
1	8	4	Andrew Wilson	United States	59.69	Q
2	9	6	Yannick Käser	Switzerland	1:00.47	Q
3	9	2	Rustam Gadirov	Russia	1:00.61	Q
4	7	4	Ilya Shymanovich	Belarus	1:00.62	Q
5	9	4	Dmitriy Balandin	Kazakhstan	1:00.76	Q
6	9	8	Ryuya Mura	Japan	1:01.12	Q
7	8	5	Marcin Stolarski	Poland	1:01.22	Q
8	6	5	Elijah Wall	Canada	1:01.27	Q
9	7	5	Andrius Šidlauskas	Lithuania	1:01.29	Q
10	8	3	Raphael Rodrigues	Brazil	1:01.32	Q
11	9	7	Andrea Toniato	Italy	1:01.34	Q
12	9	3	Jacob Montague	United States	1:01.36	Q
13	8	6	Mamoru Mori	Japan	1:01.43	Q
14	8	1	Kim Jae-youn	South Korea	1:01.47	Q
15	6	2	Darragh Greene	Ireland	1:01.56	Q
16	9	1	Felipe Monni	Brazil	1:01.67	Q
17	7	3	Jorge Murillo	Colombia	1:01.70	
18	7	2	Nicholas Quinn	Ireland	1:01.79	
19	8	7	Mikhail Dorinov	Russia	1:01.80	
20	7	7	Federico Poggio	Italy	1:01.83	
21	7	6	Johannes Skagius	Sweden	1:01.94	
22	8	2	Maximilian Pilger	Germany	1:02.07	
23	5	7	Alaric Basson	South Africa	1:02.22	
24	8	8	Mauro Castillo	Mexico	1:02.35	
25	6	7	Tomáš Klobučník	Slovakia	1:02.37	
26	5	1	Alex Milligan	Australia	1:02.38	
27	9	5	Fabian Schwingenschlögl	Germany	1:02.45	
27	4	7	Chao Man Hou	Macau	1:02.48	
29	5	2	Miikka Ruohoniemi	Finland	1:02.56	
30	6	1	George Schroder	New Zealand	1:02.58	
31	7	1	Itay Goldfaden	Israel	1:02.66	
32	7	8	Johannes Dietrich	Austria	1:02.79	
33	6	3	Lee Hsuan-yen	Chinese Taipei	1:02.84	
34	6	4	Jolann Bovey	Switzerland	1:02.85	
35	4	4	Teemu Vuorela	Finland	1:02.97	
36	6	6	Oleksandr Karpenko	Ukraine	1:03.19	
37	5	4	Daniils Bobrovs	Latvia	1:03.21	
38	4	6	Antoine Viquerat	France	1:03.35	
39	5	3	Jacob Garrod	New Zealand	1:03.48	
40	6	8	Aibek Kamzenov	Kazakhstan	1:03.51	
41	5	8	Gabriel Morelli	Argentina	1:03.65	
42	4	5	Shin Hyeong-keun	South Korea	1:03.80	
43	5	6	Nikolajs Maskaļenko	Latvia	1:03.87	
44	4	3	Kwok Ka Fai	Hong Kong	1:03.93	
45	5	5	Hsu Han-peng	Chinese Taipei	1:03.95	
46	4	2	Joaquin Serra	Argentina	1:04.12	
47	4	1	Gerdi Zulfitranto	Indonesia	1:04.43	
48	3	6	Ayrton Kasemets	Estonia	1:05.25	
49	3	5	Chen Hongrui	China	1:06.05	
50	3	4	Kenneth Lim	Singapore	1:06.07	
51	4	8	Wong Ho Kiu	Hong Kong	1:06.79	
52	3	3	José Gálvez	Chile	1:06.85	
53	3	1	Felipe Quiroz	Chile	1:07.67	
54	2	5	Zandanbal Gunsennorov	Mongolia	1:08.39	
55	2	4	Maksim Akavantsev	Estonia	1:09.42	
56	3	7	Alejandro López	Costa Rica	1:09.71	
57	3	8	Anthony Souaiby	Lebanon	1:09.82	
58	2	6	Daniel Tung	Singapore	1:10.87	
59	3	2	Drew Magbag	Philippines	1:11.39	
60	2	2	Rodrigo Guerra	Nicaragua	1:12.31	
61	2	7	Taveesh Edussuriya	Sri Lanka	1:15.13	
62	1	3	Daisuke Ssegwanyi	Uganda	1:17.21	
63	1	6	Ruben Frio	Mozambique	1:17.22	
64	2	8	Sameera Vithanage	Sri Lanka	1:23.91	
65	1	4	Salim Al-Masroori	Oman	1:25.27	
	1	5	Mohammed Al-Habsi	Oman	DSQ	
	2	1	Sunday Nwabogor	Nigeria	DNS	
	2	3	Forsight Osamezu	Nigeria	DNS	

=== Semifinals ===
The semifinals were held on 20 August at 19:41.

==== Semifinal 1 ====
Rank	Lane	Name	Nationality	Time	Notes
1	4	Yannick Käser	Switzerland	1:00.53	Q
2	5	Ilya Shymanovich	Belarus	1:00.65	Q
3	7	Jacob Montague	United States	1:00.97	Q
4	3	Ryuya Mura	Japan	1:01.37	
5	6	Elijah Wall	Canada	1:01.48	
6	1	Kim Jae-youn	South Korea	1:01.54	
7	8	Felipe Monni	Brazil	1:01.60	
8	2	Raphael Rodrigues	Brazil	1:01.75	

==== Semifinal 2 ====
Rank	Lane	Name	Nationality	Time	Notes
1	3	Dmitriy Balandin	Kazakhstan	1:00.27	Q
2	4	Andrew Wilson	United States	1:00.49	Q
3	5	Rustam Gadirov	Russia	1:00.66	Q
4	2	Andrius Šidlauskas	Lithuania	1:01.05	Q
5	6	Marcin Stolarski	Poland	1:01.14	Q
6	1	Mamoru Mori	Japan	1:01.36	
7	8	Darragh Greene	Ireland	1:01.89	
8	7	Andrea Toniato	Italy	1:01.92	

=== Final ===
The final was held on 21 August at 19:34.

Rank	Lane	Name	Nationality	Time	Notes
1st place, gold medalist(s)	6	Ilya Shymanovich	Belarus	1:00.15	
1st place, gold medalist(s)	5	Andrew Wilson	United States	1:00.15	
3rd place, bronze medalist(s)	4	Dmitriy Balandin	Kazakhstan	1:00.17	
4	3	Yannick Käser	Switzerland	1:00.35	NR
5	2	Rustam Gadirov	Russia	1:00.68	
6	7	Jacob Montague	United States	1:00.93	
7	1	Andrius Šidlauskas	Lithuania	1:00.95	
8	8	Marcin Stolarski	Poland	1:01.30	
