= Swimming at the 2017 Summer Universiade – Men's 50 metre breaststroke =

Swimming at the 2017 Summer Universiade

Men's 50 metre breaststroke at the 2017 Summer Universiade
- Venue: National Taiwan Sport University Arena
- Location: Taipei, Taiwan
- Dates: 24 August (heats and semifinals); 25 August (final)
- Competitors: 66 from 45 nations
- Winning time: 27.39

Medalists
gold medal	Ilya Shymanovich	Belarus
silver medal	Johannes Skagius	Sweden
bronze medal	Fabian Schwingenschlögl	Germany

The Men's 50 metre breaststroke competition at the 2017 Summer Universiade was held on 24 and 25 August 2017.

== Records ==
Before the competition, the existing world and Universiade records were as follows.

World record	Adam Peaty (GBR)	25.95	Budapest, Hungary	25 July 2017
Competition record	Andrea Toniato (ITA)	27.06	Gwangju, South Korea	8 July 2015

== Results ==
=== Heats ===
The heats were held on 24 August at 10:07.

Rank	Heat	Lane	Name	Nationality	Time	Notes
1	9	4	Ilya Shymanovich	Belarus	27.42	Q
2	8	5	Andrea Toniato	Italy	27.54	Q
3	7	4	Andrew Wilson	United States	27.57	Q
4	9	5	Fabian Schwingenschlögl	Germany	27.62	Q
5	8	3	Felipe Monni	Brazil	27.66	Q
6	7	6	Dmitriy Balandin	Kazakhstan	27.81	Q
7	8	7	Darragh Greene	Ireland	27.87	Q
8	8	4	Raphael Rodrigues	Brazil	27.95	Q
9	8	4	Johannes Skagius	Sweden	27.96	Q
10	9	1	Shin Hyeong-keun	South Korea	28.00	Q
11	7	5	Jorge Murillo	Colombia	28.01	Q
12	6	4	Wu Chun-feng	Chinese Taipei	28.02	Q, NR
13	7	7	Yannick Käser	Switzerland	28.03	Q
14	5	4	Rintaro Okubo	Japan	28.18	Q
14	8	2	Andrius Šidlauskas	Lithuania	28.18	Q
16	9	7	Jacob Montague	United States	28.24	QSO
16	7	3	Marcin Stolarski	Poland	28.24	QSO
18	5	7	Alaric Basson	South Africa	28.28	
19	9	8	Kim Jae-youn	South Korea	28.29	
20	9	2	Nikolajs Maskaļenko	Latvia	28.32	
21	5	3	Mamoru Mori	Japan	28.40	
22	6	2	Elijah Wall	Canada	28.42	
23	4	3	Chao Man Hou	Macau	28.47	NR
24	7	2	Itay Goldfaden	Israel	28.54	
25	8	1	Jolann Bovey	Switzerland	28.58	
26	8	8	Aibek Kamzenov	Kazakhstan	28.59	
27	6	8	Teemu Vuorela	Finland	28.61	
27	7	1	Mikhail Dorinov	Russia	28.61	
29	5	1	Filip Wypych	Poland	28.62	
30	6	3	Bernhard Reitshammer	Austria	28.65	
31	6	5	Maximilian Pilger	Germany	28.66	
32	4	4	Mauro Castillo	Mexico	28.67	
33	7	8	Rustam Gadirov	Russia	28.74	
34	9	6	Ari-Pekka Liukkonen	Finland	28.76	
35	5	5	Tomáš Klobučník	Slovakia	28.80	
36	6	6	Oleksandr Karpenko	Ukraine	28.83	
37	5	6	Joaquin Serra	Argentina	28.92	
38	6	7	Jacob Garrod	New Zealand	29.03	
39	5	2	Johannes Dietrich	Austria	29.12	
40	6	1	Hsu Han-peng	Chinese Taipei	29.14	
41	5	8	Gabriel Morelli	Argentina	29.31	
42	4	5	Alex Milligan	Australia	29.32	
43	4	2	Valts Feldbergs	Latvia	29.46	
44	4	6	Kenneth Lim	Singapore	29.56	
45	4	7	Ng Yan Kin	Hong Kong	29.90	
46	4	1	Wong Ho Kiu	Hong Kong	29.95	
47	3	3	Chen Hongrui	China	29.96	
48	3	2	Ayrton Kasemets	Estonia	30.09	
49	3	5	Gerdi Zulfitranto	Indonesia	30.15	
50	3	8	Alejandro López	Costa Rica	30.54	
51	2	3	Oren Malka	Israel	30.57	
52	3	6	José Gálvez	Chile	30.70	
53	2	4	Lim Fang Yi	Singapore	30.92	
54	4	8	Zandanbal Gunsennorov	Mongolia	31.27	
55	2	7	Anthony Souaiby	Lebanon	31.77	
56	2	6	Óscar Euceda	Honduras	32.07	
57	3	4	Drew Magbag	Philippines	32.52	
58	2	2	Rodrigo Guerra	Nicaragua	33.53	
59	2	8	Taveesh Edussuriya	Sri Lanka	33.74	
60	1	2	Ruben Frio	Mozambique	33.88	
61	1	6	Mohammed Al-Habsi	Oman	34.18	
62	2	1	Daniil Latt	Estonia	34.43	
63	1	5	Sameera Vithanage	Sri Lanka	35.45	
64	1	8	Salim Al-Masroori	Oman	35.63	
65	1	1	Tamir Jargalsaikhan	Mongolia	37.94	
	1	7	Daisuke Ssegwanyi	Uganda	DSQ	
	1	4	Sunday Nwabogor	Nigeria	DNS	
	1	3	Makram Fatoul	Lebanon	DNS	
	2	5	Mhikcoloe Abina	Philippines	DNS	
	3	1	Willian Vallejos	Paraguay	DNS	
	3	7	Forsight Osamezu	Nigeria	DNS	
	9	3	Mattia Pesce	Italy	DNS	

=== Swim-off ===
Rank	Lane	Name	Nationality	Time	Notes
1	5	Jacob Montague	United States	27.81	Q
2	4	Marcin Stolarski	Poland	28.31	

=== Semifinals ===
The semifinals were held on 24 August at 20:29.

==== Semifinal 1 ====
Rank	Lane	Name	Nationality	Time	Notes
1	3	Dmitriy Balandin	Kazakhstan	27.61	Q
2	6	Fabian Schwingenschlögl	Germany	27.62	Q
3	5	Raphael Rodrigues	Brazil	27.77	Q
4	4	Andrea Toniato	Italy	27.90	
5	8	Jacob Montague	United States	27.96	
6	1	Rintaro Okubo	Japan	28.12	
7	7	Wu Chun-feng	Chinese Taipei	28.17	
8	2	Shin Hyeong-keun	South Korea	28.34	

==== Semifinal 2 ====
Rank	Lane	Name	Nationality	Time	Notes
1	4	Ilya Shymanovich	Belarus	27.46	Q
2	2	Johannes Skagius	Sweden	27.58	Q
3	5	Andrew Wilson	United States	27.65	Q
4	3	Felipe Monni	Brazil	27.69	Q
5	6	Darragh Greene	Ireland	27.85	Q
6	7	Jorge Murillo	Colombia	27.86	
7	8	Andrius Šidlauskas	Lithuania	28.04	
8	1	Yannick Käser	Switzerland	28.09	

=== Final ===
The final was held on 25 August at 20:28.

Rank	Lane	Name	Nationality	Time	Notes
1st place, gold medalist(s)	4	Ilya Shymanovich	Belarus	27.39	
2nd place, silver medalist(s)	5	Johannes Skagius	Sweden	27.49	
3rd place, bronze medalist(s)	6	Fabian Schwingenschlögl	Germany	27.63	
4	2	Andrew Wilson	United States	27.64	
5	3	Dmitriy Balandin	Kazakhstan	27.65	
6	8	Darragh Greene	Ireland	27.76	
7	7	Felipe Monni	Brazil	27.81	
8	1	Raphael Rodrigues	Brazil	27.93	
