= Swimming at the 2017 Summer Universiade – Men's 200 metre breaststroke =

Men's 200 metre breaststroke at the 2017 Summer Universiade
- Venue: National Taiwan Sport University Arena
- Location: Taipei, Taiwan
- Dates: 22 August (heats and semifinals); 23 August (final)
- Competitors: 50 from 36 nations
- Winning time: 2:08.45

Medalists
gold medal	Andrew Wilson	United States
silver medal	Dmitriy Balandin	Kazakhstan
bronze medal	Rustam Gadirov	Russia

The Men's 200 metre breaststroke competition at the 2017 Summer Universiade was held on 22 and 23 August 2017.

== Records ==
Prior to the competition, the existing world and Universiade records were as follows.

World record	Ippei Watanabe (JPN)	2:06.67	Tokyo, Japan	29 January 2017
Competition record	Ihor Borysyk (UKR)	2:08.73	Belgrade, Serbia	8 July 2009

The following new records were set during this competition.

Date	Event	Name	Nationality	Time	Record
22 August	Heats	Andrew Wilson	United States	2:08.37	UR

== Results ==
=== Heats ===
The heats were held on 22 August at 9:38.

Rank	Heat	Lane	Name	Nationality	Time	Notes
1	6	4	Andrew Wilson	United States	2:08.37	Q, UR
2	5	4	Mikhail Dorinov	Russia	2:10.93	Q
3	7	4	Dmitriy Balandin	Kazakhstan	2:11.73	Q
4	6	3	Rintaro Okubo	Japan	2:11.82	Q
5	7	5	Rustam Gadirov	Russia	2:11.86	Q
6	5	6	Yannick Käser	Switzerland	2:12.69	Q
7	6	5	Will Licon	United States	2:13.10	Q
8	7	3	Mamoru Mori	Japan	2:13.16	Q
9	7	6	Nicholas Quinn	Ireland	2:13.54	Q
10	5	3	Flavio Bizzarri	Italy	2:13.71	Q
10	7	2	Elijah Wall	Canada	2:13.71	Q
12	5	5	Maximilian Pilger	Germany	2:13.81	Q
13	7	7	Alex Milligan	Australia	2:13.94	Q
14	5	2	Mauro Castillo	Mexico	2:14.14	Q
15	6	1	George Schroder	New Zealand	2:15.16	Q
16	5	1	Lee Hsuan-yen	Chinese Taipei	2:15.20	
17	5	8	Jolann Bovey	Switzerland	2:15.23	
18	5	7	Ilya Shymanovich	Belarus	2:15.30	
19	6	2	Kim Jae-youn	South Korea	2:15.82	
20	3	6	Alaric Basson	South Africa	2:16.19	
21	3	1	Arjan Knipping	Netherlands	2:16.20	
22	4	3	Darragh Greene	Ireland	2:16.35	
22	6	7	Cai Bing-rong	Chinese Taipei	2:16.35	
24	7	8	Johannes Dietrich	Austria	2:16.74	
25	6	6	Fabian Schwingenschlögl	Germany	2:16.79	
26	4	1	Raphael Rodrigues	Brazil	2:16.89	
26	4	6	Jacob Garrod	New Zealand	2:16.89	
28	6	8	Adam Paulsson	Sweden	2:17.06	
29	3	2	Miikka Ruohoniemi	Finland	2:17.22	
30	2	5	Chao Man Hou	Macau	2:17.48	
31	4	8	Teemu Vuorela	Finland	2:17.63	
32	7	1	Daniils Bobrovs	Latvia	2:17.67	
33	4	5	Andrius Šidlauskas	Lithuania	2:18.67	
34	4	2	Oleksandr Karpenko	Ukraine	2:18.82	
35	3	7	Felipe Monni	Brazil	2:19.12	
36	4	4	Jorge Murillo	Colombia	2:19.52	
37	2	4	Gerdi Zulfitranto	Indonesia	2:19.66	
38	3	4	Marcin Stolarski	Poland	2:19.89	
39	3	3	Kwok Ka Fai	Hong Kong	2:20.04	
40	3	5	Aibek Kamzenov	Kazakhstan	2:20.09	
41	4	7	Gabriel Morelli	Argentina	2:20.39	
42	3	8	William Lulek	Sweden	2:22.84	
43	2	3	Jose Galvez	Chile	2:24.33	
44	2	7	Ayrton Kasemets	Estonia	2:27.24	
45	2	2	Felipe Quiroz	Chile	2:27.37	
46	2	6	Zandanbal Gunsennorov	Mongolia	2:30.52	
47	1	4	Maksim Akavantsev	Estonia	2:38.25	
48	2	1	Rodrigo Guerra	Nicaragua	2:39.30	
49	2	8	Taveesh Edussuriya	Sri Lanka	2:50.74	
50	1	5	Mohamed Al-Bulushi	Oman	4:24.88	
	1	3	Matias Pinto	Chile	DNS	

=== Semifinals ===
The semifinals were held on 22 August at 19:22.

==== Semifinal 1 ====
Rank	Lane	Name	Nationality	Time	Notes
1	4	Mikhail Dorinov	Russia	2:10.31	Q
2	5	Rintaro Okubo	Japan	2:11.04	Q
3	3	Yannick Käser	Switzerland	2:12.30	Q
4	6	Mamoru Mori	Japan	2:12.38	Q
5	7	Maximilian Pilger	Germany	2:12.67	
6	2	Elijah Wall	Canada	2:13.29	
7	1	Mauro Castillo	Mexico	2:14.87	
8	8	Lee Hsuan-yen	Chinese Taipei	2:15.36	

==== Semifinal 2 ====
Rank	Lane	Name	Nationality	Time	Notes
1	3	Rustam Gadirov	Russia	2:09.87	Q
2	5	Dmitriy Balandin	Kazakhstan	2:10.51	Q
2	6	Will Licon	United States	2:10.51	Q
4	4	Andrew Wilson	United States	2:10.73	Q
5	2	Nicholas Quinn	Ireland	2:12.76	
6	1	Alex Milligan	Australia	2:13.37	
7	7	Flavio Bizzarri	Italy	2:14.17	
8	8	George Schroder	New Zealand	2:14.42	

=== Final ===
The final was held on 23 August at 20:00.

Rank	Lane	Name	Nationality	Time	Notes
1st place, gold medalist(s)	2	Andrew Wilson	United States	2:08.45	
2nd place, silver medalist(s)	6	Dmitriy Balandin	Kazakhstan	2:09.70	
3rd place, bronze medalist(s)	4	Rustam Gadirov	Russia	2:09.72	
4	5	Mikhail Dorinov	Russia	2:09.92	
5	1	Yannick Käser	Switzerland	2:10.37	NR
6	7	Rintaro Okubo	Japan	2:10.72	
7	3	Will Licon	United States	2:10.75	
8	8	Mamoru Mori	Japan	2:12.93	
