= Finland at the 2017 Summer Universiade =

- IOC code: FIN
- National federation: Finnish Student Sports Federation
- Website: www.olympiakomitea.fi/briefly-in-english/

in Taipei, Taiwan 19 August 2017 – 30 August 2017
- Competitors: 83 (45 men and 38 women) in 10 sports
- Flag bearer: Annika Urvikko
- Medals Ranked 34th: Gold 1 Silver 1 Bronze 2 Total 4

Summer Universiade appearances
- 1959; 1961; 1963; 1965; 1967; 1970; 1973; 1975; 1977; 1979; 1981; 1983; 1985; 1987; 1989; 1991; 1993; 1995; 1997; 1999; 2001; 2003; 2005; 2007; 2009; 2011; 2013; 2015; 2017; 2019; 2021; 2025; 2027

Finland participated at the 2017 Summer Universiade in Taipei, Taiwan, from 19 to 30 August 2017. The team won one gold medal – by Ari-Pekka Liukkonen in the men's 50 metre freestyle swimming event – and three other medals in athletics events.

== Medals ==
Medal	Name	Sport	Event	Date
Gold	Ari-Pekka Liukkonen	Swimming	Men's 50 metre freestyle	26 August
Silver	Juuso Hassi	Athletics	Men's decathlon	25 August
Bronze	Jenni Kangas	Athletics	Women's javelin throw	25 August
Bronze	Elisa Neuvonen	Athletics	Women's 20 kilometres walk	26 August

== Team ==
Athletes were selected by the High Performance Unit of the Finnish Olympic Committee. Criterium was the potential to place in the top 16 in an individual event or the top 8 in a team event.

The first 41 nominations were published on 19 June 2017. The complete team, except the men's basketball team, was published on 27 July 2017. The basketball team was published on 13 August 2017.

Competitors from Finland per sport
Sport	Men	Women	Total
Archery	3	0	3
Athletics	8	9	17
Basketball	12	0	12
Fencing	4	3	7
Gymnastics	5	4	9
Judo	2	2	4
Swimming	6	4	10
Taekwondo	3	3	6
Volleyball	0	12	12
Weightlifting	2	1	3
Total	45	38	83

Chef de Mission: Jukka Tirri

== Archery ==
Athlete	Event	Qualification round		1/48 Round	1/24 Round	1/16 Round	1/8 Round	1/4 Round	1/2 Round	Medal Round	Rank
Athlete	Event	Score	Seed	Opposition Score	Opposition Score	Opposition Score	Opposition Score	Opposition Score	Opposition Score	Opposition Score	Rank
Jaakko Hepola	Men's individual recurve	604	60	Pearu Jakob Ojamäe (EST); L 6–0	Did not advance						57
Eero Mäenpää	Men's individual recurve	607	58	Nazir Omar (MAS); L 6–4	Did not advance						57
Antti Vikström	Men's individual recurve	649	26	Bye	Thomas Koenig (FRA); L 7–3	Did not advance					33
Jaakko Hepola; Eero Mäenpää; Antti Vikström	Men's team recurve	1860	17	—N/a			Did not advance				

== Athletics ==
=== Track and road ===
Athlete	Event	Round 1		Round 2		Semifinal		Final	
Athlete	Event	Time	Rank	Time	Rank	Time	Rank	Time	Rank
Jonna Berghem	Women's 400 metres hurdles	58.74 q	5	—N/a				57.90 PB	6
Lotta Harala	Women's 100 metres hurdles	13.61	10 Q	—N/a		13.71	12	—N/a	
Reetta Hurske	Women's 100 metres hurdles	13.53	7 Q	—N/a		13.67	11	—N/a	
Anniina Kortetmaa	Women's 200 metres	24.43	19 Q	—N/a		24.62	21	Did not advance	
Ville Myllymäki	Men's 100 metres	10.84	48	Did not advance					
Oskari Mörö	Men's 400 metres hurdles	50.93	12 Q	—N/a		51.04	15	Did not advance	
Elisa Neuvonen	Women's 20 kilometres walk	—N/a						1:42:50	(bronze)
Topi Raitanen	Men's 3000 metres steeplechase	—N/a						8:37.42 PB	4
Eetu Rantala	Men's 100 metres	10.55 SB	21 Q	10.55 =SB q	15	10.51 SB	14	Did not advance	
Samuli Samuelsson	Men's 200 metres	21.17	11 Q	—N/a		20.99	8	Did not advance	
Eetu Rantala; Oskari Mörö; Samuli Samuelsson; Ville Myllymäki	Men's 4 × 100 metres relay	39.67 q	6	—N/a				40.37	7

Legend: PB = personal best, SB = season best, Q = qualified by place, q = qualified by time

=== Field ===
Athlete	Event	Qualification		Final	
Athlete	Event	Result	Rank	Result	Rank
Matilda Bogdanoff	Women's long jump	6.19	5 q	6.04	10
Kristian Bäck	Men's long jump	7.47	17	Did not advance	
Jenni Kangas	Women's javelin throw	55.12	9 q	60.98 PB	(bronze)
Heidi Nokelainen	Women's javelin throw	51.95	17	Did not advance	
Sami Peltomäki	Men's javelin throw	69.55	20	Did not advance	
Kristian Pulli	Men's long jump	7.61	13	Did not advance	
Salla Sipponen	Women's discus throw	51.49	12 q	53.13	8

Legend: q = qualified by performance, PB = personal best

=== Combined ===
Athlete	Event		100	LJ	SP	HJ	400	110H	DT	PV	JT	1500	Final	Rank
Juuso Hassi	Men's decathlon	Result	11.17	7.14	13.88	1.95	50.80	15.17	41.84	4.70	54.56	4:47.67	7566	(silver)
Juuso Hassi	Men's decathlon	Points	823	847	721	758	778	829	702	819	656	633	7566	(silver)

Athlete	Event		100H	HJ	SP	200	LJ	JT	800	Final	Rank
Jutta Heikkinen	Women's heptathlon	Result	14.20	1.68	12.23	25.62	5.76	44.91	2:23.22	5606	4
Jutta Heikkinen	Women's heptathlon	Points	950	830	676	831	777	762	780	5606	4

== Basketball ==
Players	Event	Group stage		Placement round			Rank
Players	Event	Opposition Score	Rank in group	Bracket Opposition Score	Bracket Opposition Score	Bracket Opposition Score	Rank
G Fiifi Aidoo; G Tuomas Hirvonen; G Joonas Lehtoranta; G Topias Palmi; G Ilari Seppälä; C Tommi Huolila; C Anton Odabasi; C Henri Ventoniemi; F Marius van Andringa; F Shawn Hopkins (C); F Okko Järvi; F Alexander Madsen	Men's tournament	Japan (JPN); W 94–48	2	Quarterfinal; Serbia (SRB); L 85–84	Places 5th–8th Israel (ISR); L 79–97	Places 7th–8th Argentina (ARG); W 79–70	7
G Fiifi Aidoo; G Tuomas Hirvonen; G Joonas Lehtoranta; G Topias Palmi; G Ilari Seppälä; C Tommi Huolila; C Anton Odabasi; C Henri Ventoniemi; F Marius van Andringa; F Shawn Hopkins (C); F Okko Järvi; F Alexander Madsen	Men's tournament	Canada (CAN); W 71–79	2	Quarterfinal; Serbia (SRB); L 85–84	Places 5th–8th Israel (ISR); L 79–97	Places 7th–8th Argentina (ARG); W 79–70	7
G Fiifi Aidoo; G Tuomas Hirvonen; G Joonas Lehtoranta; G Topias Palmi; G Ilari Seppälä; C Tommi Huolila; C Anton Odabasi; C Henri Ventoniemi; F Marius van Andringa; F Shawn Hopkins (C); F Okko Järvi; F Alexander Madsen	Men's tournament	Norway (NOR); W 70–63	2	Quarterfinal; Serbia (SRB); L 85–84	Places 5th–8th Israel (ISR); L 79–97	Places 7th–8th Argentina (ARG); W 79–70	7
G Fiifi Aidoo; G Tuomas Hirvonen; G Joonas Lehtoranta; G Topias Palmi; G Ilari Seppälä; C Tommi Huolila; C Anton Odabasi; C Henri Ventoniemi; F Marius van Andringa; F Shawn Hopkins (C); F Okko Järvi; F Alexander Madsen	Men's tournament	Germany (GER); L 71–64	2	Quarterfinal; Serbia (SRB); L 85–84	Places 5th–8th Israel (ISR); L 79–97	Places 7th–8th Argentina (ARG); W 79–70	7
G Fiifi Aidoo; G Tuomas Hirvonen; G Joonas Lehtoranta; G Topias Palmi; G Ilari Seppälä; C Tommi Huolila; C Anton Odabasi; C Henri Ventoniemi; F Marius van Andringa; F Shawn Hopkins (C); F Okko Järvi; F Alexander Madsen	Men's tournament	Hong Kong (HKG); W 52–114	2	Quarterfinal; Serbia (SRB); L 85–84	Places 5th–8th Israel (ISR); L 79–97	Places 7th–8th Argentina (ARG); W 79–70	7

Legend: (C) = captain, G = guard, C = centre, F = forward, W = win, L = loss

== Fencing ==
=== Men ===
Fencer	Event	Preliminary round		Round of 128	Round of 64	Round of 32	Round of 16	Quarter-final	Semi-final	Final	Rank
Fencer	Event	Opposition, Score	Rank	Opposition Score	Opposition Score	Opposition Score	Opposition Score	Opposition Score	Opposition Score	Opposition Score	Rank
Gunnar Gräsbeck	Individual épée	Fardzinov (RUS) L 5–2	76 E	Did not advance							76
Gunnar Gräsbeck	Individual épée	Bellmann (GER) L 5–4	76 E	Did not advance							76
Gunnar Gräsbeck	Individual épée	Vismara (ITA) W 5–4	76 E	Did not advance							76
Gunnar Gräsbeck	Individual épée	Rod (POR) L 5–2	76 E	Did not advance							76
Gunnar Gräsbeck	Individual épée	Bielec (POL) L 5–1	76 E	Did not advance							76
Rufus Panelius	Individual épée	Herpe (ISR) L 5–2	36 Q	Bye	Weiss (USA); L 14–15	Did not advance					46
Rufus Panelius	Individual épée	Marchal (FRA) L 5–3	36 Q	Bye	Weiss (USA); L 14–15	Did not advance					46
Rufus Panelius	Individual épée	Wu (TPE) W 5–4	36 Q	Bye	Weiss (USA); L 14–15	Did not advance					46
Rufus Panelius	Individual épée	Sych (UKR) W 5–2	36 Q	Bye	Weiss (USA); L 14–15	Did not advance					46
Rufus Panelius	Individual épée	Jarl (SWE) W 5–3	36 Q	Bye	Weiss (USA); L 14–15	Did not advance					46
Rufus Panelius	Individual épée	Ye (CHN) W 5–2	36 Q	Bye	Weiss (USA); L 14–15	Did not advance					46
Teemu Seeve	Individual épée	Kurbanov (KAZ) L 5–4	51 Q	Bye	Pittet (SUI); L 15–9	Did not advance					53
Teemu Seeve	Individual épée	Buzzi (ITA) L 5–3	51 Q	Bye	Pittet (SUI); L 15–9	Did not advance					53
Teemu Seeve	Individual épée	Bida (RUS) L 5–2	51 Q	Bye	Pittet (SUI); L 15–9	Did not advance					53
Teemu Seeve	Individual épée	Hwang (KOR) W 5–4	51 Q	Bye	Pittet (SUI); L 15–9	Did not advance					53
Teemu Seeve	Individual épée	Cho Taeun (HUN) W 5–1	51 Q	Bye	Pittet (SUI); L 15–9	Did not advance					53
Teemu Seeve	Individual épée	Singh (IND) W 5–4	51 Q	Bye	Pittet (SUI); L 15–9	Did not advance					53
Niko Vuorinen	Individual épée	Kuhn (SUI) L 5–3	23 Q	Bye	Cimini (ITA); W 12–15	Narita (JPN); W 15–7	Ting (TPE); W 15–10	Bida (RUS); L 15–9	Did not advance		5
Niko Vuorinen	Individual épée	Johnston Leyer (CRC) W 5–1	23 Q	Bye	Cimini (ITA); W 12–15	Narita (JPN); W 15–7	Ting (TPE); W 15–10	Bida (RUS); L 15–9	Did not advance		5
Niko Vuorinen	Individual épée	Sharlaimov (KAZ) W 5–1	23 Q	Bye	Cimini (ITA); W 12–15	Narita (JPN); W 15–7	Ting (TPE); W 15–10	Bida (RUS); L 15–9	Did not advance		5
Niko Vuorinen	Individual épée	Eskov (EST) L 5–2	23 Q	Bye	Cimini (ITA); W 12–15	Narita (JPN); W 15–7	Ting (TPE); W 15–10	Bida (RUS); L 15–9	Did not advance		5
Niko Vuorinen	Individual épée	Mes (NED) W 5–1	23 Q	Bye	Cimini (ITA); W 12–15	Narita (JPN); W 15–7	Ting (TPE); W 15–10	Bida (RUS); L 15–9	Did not advance		5
Niko Vuorinen	Individual épée	Poncin (BEL) W 5–1	23 Q	Bye	Cimini (ITA); W 12–15	Narita (JPN); W 15–7	Ting (TPE); W 15–10	Bida (RUS); L 15–9	Did not advance		5
Rufus Panelius; Teemu Seeve; Niko Vuorinen	Team épée	—N/a				Bye	Switzerland (SUI); W 40–45	Japan (JPN); L 35–45	Did not advance		6

Legend: Q = qualified, E = eliminated, L = loss, W = win

=== Women ===
Fencer	Event	Preliminary round		Round of 128	Round of 64	Round of 32	Round of 16	Quarter-final	Semi-final	Final	Rank
Fencer	Event	Opposition, Score	Rank	Opposition Score	Opposition Score	Opposition Score	Opposition Score	Opposition Score	Opposition Score	Opposition Score	Rank
Michaela Kock	Épée	van Brummen (USA) L 5–2	15 Q	Bye	Mihaly (HUN); L 15–14	Did not advance					36
Michaela Kock	Épée	Staehli (SUI) W 5–4	15 Q	Bye	Mihaly (HUN); L 15–14	Did not advance					36
Michaela Kock	Épée	Louis Marie (FRA) W 5–3	15 Q	Bye	Mihaly (HUN); L 15–14	Did not advance					36
Michaela Kock	Épée	Tulen (NED) W 5–1	15 Q	Bye	Mihaly (HUN); L 15–14	Did not advance					36
Michaela Kock	Épée	Yu (KOR) W 5–3	15 Q	Bye	Mihaly (HUN); L 15–14	Did not advance					36
Michaela Kock	Épée	Vicatos (RSA) W 5–1	15 Q	Bye	Mihaly (HUN); L 15–14	Did not advance					36
Anna Salminen	Épée	Holmes (USA) L 5–1	49 Q	Bye	Kim (KOR); L 15–12	Did not advance					52
Anna Salminen	Épée	Svystil (UKR) W 5–3	49 Q	Bye	Kim (KOR); L 15–12	Did not advance					52
Anna Salminen	Épée	Szabo (HUN) L 5–4	49 Q	Bye	Kim (KOR); L 15–12	Did not advance					52
Anna Salminen	Épée	Saito (JPN) L 5–4	49 Q	Bye	Kim (KOR); L 15–12	Did not advance					52
Anna Salminen	Épée	Kroese (NED) W 5–3	49 Q	Bye	Kim (KOR); L 15–12	Did not advance					52
Anna Salminen	Épée	Lu (CHN) W 5–3	49 Q	Bye	Kim (KOR); L 15–12	Did not advance					52
Sofia Tauriainen	Épée	Stahlberg (GER) L 5–4	27 Q	Bye	Dordevic (SWE); W 15–5	Schmidl (AUT); L 15–7	Did not advance				25
Sofia Tauriainen	Épée	Chu (HKG) W 5–3	27 Q	Bye	Dordevic (SWE); W 15–5	Schmidl (AUT); L 15–7	Did not advance				25
Sofia Tauriainen	Épée	Zamachowska (POL) W 5–3	27 Q	Bye	Dordevic (SWE); W 15–5	Schmidl (AUT); L 15–7	Did not advance				25
Sofia Tauriainen	Épée	Nixon (USA) W 5–3	27 Q	Bye	Dordevic (SWE); W 15–5	Schmidl (AUT); L 15–7	Did not advance				25
Sofia Tauriainen	Épée	Andersen (AUS) L 5–3	27 Q	Bye	Dordevic (SWE); W 15–5	Schmidl (AUT); L 15–7	Did not advance				25
Sofia Tauriainen	Épée	Geng (CHN) W 5–3	27 Q	Bye	Dordevic (SWE); W 15–5	Schmidl (AUT); L 15–7	Did not advance				25
Michaela Kock; Anna Salminen; Sofia Tauriainen	Team épée	—N/a				Bye	France (FRA); L 32–45	Did not advance			11

Legend: W = win, L = loss, Q = qualified

== Gymnastics ==
=== Artistic ===
In both genders, the individual qualification will also act as the team all-around event final.

==== Men ====
===== Individual events =====
Gymnast	Stage	Apparatus						All-Around
Gymnast	Stage	FX	PH	RG	VT	PB	HB	All-Around
Franz Card	Qualification	10.800; 90	11.750; 61	12.500; 66	—	12.150; 76	11.300; 77	71.250; 43
Franz Card	Final	Did not advance	Did not advance	Did not advance	—	Did not advance	Did not advance	Did not advance
Elias Koski	Qualification	12.850; 46	12.600; 39	—	—	12.550; 63	12.400; 59	63.350; 61
Elias Koski	Final	Did not advance	Did not advance	—	—	Did not advance	Did not advance	Did not advance
Jimi Päivänen	Qualification	11.700; 77	11.150; 71	10.300; 80	—	12.250; 68	10.850; 80	56.250; 68
Jimi Päivänen	Final	Did not advance	Did not advance	Did not advance	—	Did not advance	Did not advance	Did not advance
Heikki Saarenketo	Qualification	12.350; 63	—	—	14.125; 8 Q	—	—	26.700; 107
Heikki Saarenketo	Final	Did not advance	—	—	14.233; 4	—	—	Did not advance
Tomi Tuuha	Qualification	—	—	13.300; 45	14.050; 11 R	12.475; 66	—	40.175; 93
Tomi Tuuha	Final	—	—	Did not advance	Did not advance	Did not advance	—	Did not advance

Legend: FX = score and rank in floor exercise, PH = score and rank in pommel horse, RG = score and rank in rings, VT = score and rank in vault, PB = score and rank in parallel bars, HB = score and rank in horizontal bar, Q = qualified, R = reserve

===== Team all-around =====
Gymnast	Apparatus					
Gymnast	FX	PH	RG	VT	PB	HB
Franz Card	(10.800)	11.750	12.500	(12.750)	(12.150)	11.300
Elias Koski	12.850	12.600	—	12.950	12.550	12.400
Jimi Päivänen	11.700	11.150	10.300	—	12.250	10.850
Heikki Saarenketo	12.350	—	—	14.350	—	—
Tomi Tuuha	—	—	13.300	14.400	12.475	—
Team all-around total Rank	222.025; 17					

Legend: FX = score in floor exercise, PH = score in pommel horse, RG = score in rings, VT = score in vault, PB = score in parallel bars, HB = score in horizontal bar, parentheses indicate a non-counting score

==== Women ====
===== Individual events =====
Gymnast	Stage	Apparatus				All-Around
Gymnast	Stage	VT	UB	BB	FX	All-Around
Maija Leinonen	Qualification	12.625; 21	11.750; 25	12.450; 15 R	11.900; 30	48.950; 15 Q
Maija Leinonen	Final	Did not advance	Did not advance	Did not advance	Did not advance	47.400; 18
Annika Urvikko	Qualification	12.775; 19	10.850; 38	11.350; 34	11.750; 37	47.350; 22 R
Annika Urvikko	Final	Did not advance	Did not advance	Did not advance	Did not advance	Did not advance
Veronika Vuosjoki	Qualification	—	10.900; 37	10.000; 54	10.375; 55	42.425; 44
Veronika Vuosjoki	Final	—	Did not advance	Did not advance	Did not advance	Did not advance

Legend: VT = score and rank in vault, UB = score and rank in uneven bars, BB = score and rank in balance beam, FX = score and rank in floor exercise, R = reserve, Q = qualified

===== Team all-around =====
Gymnast	Apparatus			
Gymnast	VT	UB	BB	FX
Maija Leinonen	12.850	11.750	12.450	11.900
Annika Urvikko	13.400	10.850	11.350	11.750
Veronika Vuosjoki	11.150	10.900	10.000	10.375
Team all-around total Rank	138.725; 9			

Legend: VT = score in vault, UB = score in uneven bars, BB = score in balance beam, FX = score in floor exercise

=== Rhythmic ===
==== Women's individual ====
Gymnast	Apparatus Qualification & All-Around Final					Apparatus Finals			
Gymnast	Hoop Rank	Ball Rank	Clubs Rank	Ribbon Rank	All-Around Rank	Hoop Rank	Ball Rank	Clubs Rank	Ribbon Rank
Inessa Rif	14.250; 15	11.800; 23	9.350; 35	9.775; 34	45.175; 26	Did not advance	Did not advance	Did not advance	Did not advance

== Judo ==
Judoka	Event	1/32 Final	1/16 Final	1/8 Final	1/4 Final	Semifinal	Repechage 32	Repechage 16	Repechage 8	Repechage final	Medals	Rank
Judoka	Event	Opposition Result	Opposition Result	Opposition Result	Opposition Result	Opposition Result	Opposition Result	Opposition Result	Opposition Result	Opposition Result	Opposition Result	Rank
Alexandra Barton	Women's welterweight	—N/a	Orellana Rojas (CHI); W by ippon	Blagojevic (CRO); L by ippon	Did not advance		—N/a	Did not advance				
Otto Koponen	Men's bantamweight	—N/a	Ajay (IND); W by waza-ari	Fujisaka (JPN); L by ippon	Did not advance		—N/a	Morgoyev (UKR); L by ippon	Did not advance			
Marianne Kosonen	Women's bantamweight	—N/a	Şentürk (TUR); W by golden point	Zegers (NED); L by waza-ari	Did not advance		—N/a	Did not advance				
Aatu Laamanen	Men's middleweight	McGinty (USA); W by waza-ari	Low (SGP); W by hansoku-make	Harder (NED); L by ippon	Did not advance							

Legend: W = win, L = loss

== Swimming ==
=== Men ===
Athlete	Event	Heats		Semifinal		Final	
Athlete	Event	Time	Rank	Time	Rank	Time	Rank
Ari-Pekka Liukkonen	100 metre freestyle	50.39	22	Did not advance			
Ari-Pekka Liukkonen	50 metre breaststroke	28.76	34	Did not advance			
Ari-Pekka Liukkonen	50 metre freestyle	22.28	5 Q	21.99	2 Q	22.02	(gold)
Ari-Pekka Liukkonen	50 metre butterfly	24.37	21	Did not advance			
Janne Markkanen	100 metre backstroke	59.54	47	Did not advance			
Janne Markkanen	50 metre backstroke	27.05	45	Did not advance			
Janne Markkanen	100 metre butterfly	58.74	61	Did not advance			
Eetu Piiroinen	400 metre freestyle	4:02.60	30	—N/a		Did not advance	
Eetu Piiroinen	200 metre freestyle	1:55.35	39	Did not advance			
Eetu Piiroinen	200 metre butterfly	2:08.57	34	Did not advance			
Eetu Piiroinen	800 metre freestyle	8:28.78	24	—N/a		Did not advance	
Eetu Piiroinen	400 metre individual medley	4:41.19	26	Did not advance			
Jaakko Rautalin	50 metre backstroke	27.56	47	Did not advance			
Jaakko Rautalin	100 metre butterfly	56.86	56	Did not advance			
Jaakko Rautalin	50 metre butterfly	25.14	49	Did not advance			
Miikka Ruohoniemi	100 metre breaststroke	1:02.56	29	Did not advance			
Miikka Ruohoniemi	200 metre freestyle	1:53.72	34	Did not advance			
Miikka Ruohoniemi	200 metre breaststroke	2:17.22	29	Did not advance			
Miikka Ruohoniemi	50 metre freestyle	23.45	42	Did not advance			
Teemu Vuorela	100 metre breaststroke	1:02.97	35	Did not advance			
Teemu Vuorela	200 metre breaststroke	2:17.63	31	Did not advance			
Teemu Vuorela	200 metre individual medley	2:03.72	19	Did not advance			
Teemu Vuorela	100 metre freestyle	50.47	27	Did not advance			
Teemu Vuorela	50 metre breaststroke	28.61	27	Did not advance			
Teemu Vuorela	400 metre individual medley	4:39.17	24	Did not advance			

Legend: Q = classified for the next round

=== Women ===
Athlete	Event	Heats		Semifinal		Final	
Athlete	Event	Time	Rank	Time	Rank	Time	Rank
Patricia Aschan	400 metre individual medley	4:57.38	17	—N/a		Did not advance	
Patricia Aschan	200 metre individual medley	2:18.91	17	Did not advance			
Patricia Aschan	200 metre breaststroke	2:35.03	22	Did not advance			
Patricia Aschan	200 metre freestyle	2:07.45	36	Did not advance			
Tanja Kylliäinen	200 metre freestyle	2:07.18	34	Did not advance			
Tanja Kylliäinen	200 metre individual medley	2:20.76	22	Did not advance			
Tanja Kylliäinen	400 metre individual medley	5:03.34	19	—N/a		Did not advance	
Nea Norismaa	50 metre butterfly	27.63	22	Did not advance			
Nea Norismaa	50 metre freestyle	26.88	25	Did not advance			
Nea Norismaa	100 metre butterfly	1:02.55	31	Did not advance			
Nea Norismaa	50 metre backstroke	30.55	27	Did not advance			
Fanny Teijonsalo	50 metre butterfly	28.40	32	Did not advance			
Fanny Teijonsalo	100 metre freestyle	57.55	26	Did not advance			
Fanny Teijonsalo	100 metre backstroke	1:04.89	32	Did not advance			
Fanny Teijonsalo	100 metre butterfly	1:03.96	34	Did not advance			
Fanny Teijonsalo	50 metre backstroke	30.60	28	Did not advance			
Fanny Teijonsalo; Patricia Aschan; Nea Norismaa; Tanja Kylliäinen	4 x 100 metre freestyle relay	3:55.45	15	—N/a		Did not advance	

== Taekwondo ==
=== Kyorugi ===
Athlete	Event	Round of 32	Round of 16	Quarter-final	Semi-final	Final	Rank
Athlete	Event	Opposition Result	Opposition Result	Opposition Result	Opposition Result	Opposition Result	Rank
Roosa Närhi	Women's 62 kg	Anna-Lena Frömming (GER); L by score 15–2	Did not advance				
Jenna Partanen	Women's 67 kg	Kubra Kiyi (TUR); L by score 15–2	Did not advance				

Legend: L = loss

=== Poomsae ===
Taekwondoka	Event	Preliminary round		Semifinal		Final	
Taekwondoka	Event	Score	Rank	Score	Rank	Score	Rank
Essi Labart	Women's individual	75.0	12	Did not advance			
Frans Salmi	Men's individual	75.7	9	Did not advance			
Christian Kamphuis; Frans Salmi; Olli Siltanen	Men's team	—N/a		74.6	8	70.3	6

== Volleyball ==
Players	Event	Group stage		Placement round	Rank
Players	Event	Opposition Score	Rank	Bracket Opposition Score	Rank
S Kaisa Alanko; S Iida Paananen; OP Salla Karhu; OP Piia Korhonen; OH Ronja Heikkiniemi; OH Noora Kosonen; OH Lotta Piesanen; MB Roosa Laakkonen; MB Yasmine Madsen; MB Laura Pihlajamäki (C); MB Daniela Öhman; LI Roosa Koskelo	Women's tournament	Brazil (BRA); W 0–3	2	Quarterfinal; Japan (JPN); L 1–3	5
S Kaisa Alanko; S Iida Paananen; OP Salla Karhu; OP Piia Korhonen; OH Ronja Heikkiniemi; OH Noora Kosonen; OH Lotta Piesanen; MB Roosa Laakkonen; MB Yasmine Madsen; MB Laura Pihlajamäki (C); MB Daniela Öhman; LI Roosa Koskelo	Women's tournament	Russia (RUS); L 0–3	2	Placement 5th–8th Argentina (ARG); W 0–3	5
S Kaisa Alanko; S Iida Paananen; OP Salla Karhu; OP Piia Korhonen; OH Ronja Heikkiniemi; OH Noora Kosonen; OH Lotta Piesanen; MB Roosa Laakkonen; MB Yasmine Madsen; MB Laura Pihlajamäki (C); MB Daniela Öhman; LI Roosa Koskelo	Women's tournament	Mexico (MEX); W 0–3	2	Placement 5th–6th Thailand (THA); W 3–1	5

Legend: C = team captain, S = setter player, OH = outside hitter, MB = middle blocker, OP = opposite player, LI = libero, W = win, L = loss

== Weightlifting ==
Lifter	Event	Snatch	Clean & Jerk	Total	Rank
Saara Leskinen	Women's 63 kg	86 kg	105 kg	191 kg	10
Sami Raappana	Men's 85 kg	123 kg	168 kg	291 kg	13
Eero Retulainen	Men's 94 kg	151 kg	190 kg	341 kg	12
