= Swimming at the 2017 Summer Universiade – Women's 200 metre individual medley =

Women's 200 metre individual medley at the 2017 Summer Universiade
- Venue: National Taiwan Sport University Arena
- Location: Taipei, Taiwan
- Dates: 22 August (heats and semifinals); 23 August (final)
- Competitors: 39 from 25 nations
- Winning time: 2:10.03

Medalists
gold medal	Yui Ohashi	Japan
silver medal	Ella Eastin	United States
bronze medal	Kim Seo-yeong	South Korea

The Women's 200 metre individual medley competition at the 2017 Summer Universiade was held on 22 and 23 August 2017.

== Records ==
Prior to the competition, the existing world and Universiade records were as follows.

World record	Katinka Hosszú (HUN)	2:06.12	Kazan, Russia	3 August 2015
Competition record	Ava Ohlgren (USA)	2:12.07	Belgrade, Serbia	8 July 2009

The following new records were set during this competition.

Date	Event	Name	Nationality	Time	Record
23 August	Final	Yui Ohashi	Japan	2:10.03	UR

== Results ==
=== Heats ===
The heats were held on 22 August at 09:18.

Rank	Heat	Lane	Name	Nationality	Time	Notes
1	4	5	Sarah Darcel	Canada	2:13.20	Q
2	5	6	Ella Eastin	United States	2:14.11	Q
3	6	4	Yui Ohashi	Japan	2:14.45	Q
4	4	3	Brooke Forde	United States	2:14.88	Q
5	6	5	Miho Teramura	Japan	2:15.13	Q
6	6	7	Kristina Vershinina	Russia	2:15.16	Q
7	6	3	Evelyn Verrasztó	Hungary	2:15.29	Q
8	5	3	Bailey Andison	Canada	2:15.60	Q
9	4	4	Kim Seo-yeong	South Korea	2:15.77	Q
10	5	5	Barbora Závadová	Czech Republic	2:16.28	Q
11	5	2	Abbey Harkin	Australia	2:17.36	Q
12	6	6	Kristýna Horská	Czech Republic	2:17.53	Q
13	5	6	Laura Letrari	Italy	2:17.68	Q
14	4	6	Carlotta Toni	Italy	2:17.90	Q
15	5	8	Paula Żukowska	Poland	2:17.93	Q
16	5	7	Réka György	Hungary	2:17.99	Q
17	4	7	Patricia Aschan	Finland	2:18.91	
18	5	1	Martina van Berkel	Switzerland	2:19.22	
19	6	8	Melissa Rodríguez	Mexico	2:19.92	
20	4	1	Vilma Ekström	Sweden	2:20.09	
21	3	1	Lin Xinlan	China	2:20.14	
22	6	1	Noémi Girardet	Switzerland	2:20.39	
23	6	2	Tanja Kylliäinen	Finland	2:20.76	
23	3	3	Margaret Higgs	Bahamas	2:21.97	
25	2	4	Ana Monteiro	Portugal	2:22.31	
26	3	4	Emily Visagie	South Africa	2:22.84	
27	3	5	Wong Yee Ching	Hong Kong	2:23.63	
28	3	6	Xu Lili	China	2:24.18	
29	3	7	Fiamma Peroni	Argentina	2:24.41	
30	3	2	Tatjana Schoenmaker	South Africa	2:24.93	
31	3	8	Ip Rainbow	Hong Kong	2:26.23	
32	2	3	Daniela Reyes	Chile	2:31.58	
33	2	5	Laura Abril Lizarazo	Colombia	2:32.17	
34	2	6	Alejandra Chamorro	Chile	2:34.74	
35	2	7	Maria Giraldo Ocampo	Colombia	2:35.88	
36	1	4	Chrystelle Doueihy	Lebanon	2:36.63	
37	2	2	Ho Yan Lum Deborah	Singapore	2:41.90	
38	1	5	Lynn Doughane	Lebanon	2:51.85	
39	1	3	Alliah Saliendra	Philippines	3:13.65	
	4	2	Alicja Tchórz	Poland	DNS	
	4	8	Hamida Nefsi	Algeria	DNS	

=== Semifinals ===
The semifinals were held on 22 August at 19:32.

==== Semifinal 1 ====
Rank	Lane	Name	Nationality	Time	Notes
1	4	Ella Eastin	United States	2:12.70	Q
2	2	Barbora Závadová	Czech Republic	2:14.53	Q
3	5	Brooke Forde	United States	2:14.70	Q
4	3	Kristina Vershinina	Russia	2:14.90	
5	6	Bailey Andison	Canada	2:15.28	
6	7	Kristýna Horská	Czech Republic	2:15.41	
7	8	Réka György	Hungary	2:17.25	
8	1	Carlotta Toni	Italy	2:19.09	

==== Semifinal 2 ====
Rank	Lane	Name	Nationality	Time	Notes
1	5	Yui Ohashi	Japan	2:12.17	Q
2	3	Miho Teramura	Japan	2:12.41	Q
3	4	Sarah Darcel	Canada	2:12.66	Q
4	6	Evelyn Verrasztó	Hungary	2:13.14	Q
5	2	Kim Seo-yeong	South Korea	2:14.19	Q
6	7	Abbey Harkin	Australia	2:16.98	
7	8	Paula Żukowska	Poland	2:17.24	
8	1	Laura Letrari	Italy	2:18.17	

=== Final ===
The final was held on 23 August at 19:22.

Rank	Lane	Name	Nationality	Time	Notes
1st place, gold medalist(s)	4	Yui Ohashi	Japan	2:10.03	UR
2nd place, silver medalist(s)	6	Ella Eastin	United States	2:11.12	
3rd place, bronze medalist(s)	7	Kim Seo-yeong	South Korea	2:11.62	
4	5	Miho Teramura	Japan	2:11.85	
5	3	Sarah Darcel	Canada	2:13.18	
6	2	Evelyn Verrasztó	Hungary	2:13.31	
7	8	Brooke Forde	United States	2:13.43	
8	1	Barbora Závadová	Czech Republic	2:16.34	
