= Swimming at the 2017 Summer Universiade – Women's 400 metre individual medley =

Women's 400 metre individual medley at the 2017 Summer Universiade
- Venue: National Taiwan Sport University Arena
- Location: Taipei, Taiwan
- Dates: 20 August (heats and final)
- Competitors: 21 from 14 nations
- Winning time: 4:34.40

Medalists
gold medal	Yui Ohashi	Japan
silver medal	Allyson McHugh	United States
bronze medal	Kim Seo-yeong	South Korea

The Women's 400 metre individual medley competition at the 2017 Summer Universiade was held on 20 August 2017.

== Records ==
Prior to the competition, the existing world and Universiade records were as follows.

World record	Katinka Hosszú (HUN)	4:26.36	Rio de Janeiro, Brazil	6 August 2016
Competition record	Yana Klochkova (UKR)	4:37.50	Bangkok, Thailand	12 August 2007

The following new records were set during this competition.

Date	Event	Name	Nationality	Time	Record
20 August	Final	Yui Ohashi	Japan	4:34.40	UR

== Results ==
=== Heats ===
The heats were held at 10:10.

Rank	Heat	Lane	Name	Nationality	Time	Notes
1	3	4	Yui Ohashi	Japan	4:40.82	Q
2	3	6	Allyson McHugh	United States	4:41.47	Q
3	3	3	Sarah Darcel	Canada	4:41.90	Q
4	2	6	Réka György	Hungary	4:43.52	Q
5	2	5	Brooke Forde	United States	4:43.73	Q
6	2	4	Barbora Závadová	Czech Republic	4:43.82	Q
7	3	2	Carlotta Toni	Italy	4:43.91	Q
8	3	5	Kim Seo-yeong	South Korea	4:44.30	Q
9	2	3	Wakaba Tsuyuuchi	Japan	4:45.00	
10	3	7	Kiah Melverton	Australia	4:47.41	
11	1	5	Paula Żukowska	Poland	4:48.55	
12	3	1	Kristina Vershinina	Russia	4:48.68	
13	2	2	Meg Bailey	Australia	4:48.87	
14	2	1	Kristýna Horská	Czech Republic	4:51.03	
15	3	8	Bailey Andison	Canada	4:52.65	
16	1	4	Claudia Hufnagl	Austria	4:53.96	
17	2	8	Patricia Aschan	Finland	4:57.38	
18	1	6	Dora Kiss	Hungary	5:02.25	
19	2	7	Tanja Kylliäinen	Finland	5:03.34	
20	1	2	Fiamma Peroni	Argentina	5:12.97	
21	1	7	Laura Abril Lizarazo	Colombia	5:25.04	
	1	3	Hamida Rania Nefsi	Algeria	DNS	

=== Final ===
The final was held at 19:25.

Rank	Lane	Name	Nationality	Time	Notes
1st place, gold medalist(s)	4	Yui Ohashi	Japan	4:34.40	UR
2nd place, silver medalist(s)	5	Allyson McHugh	United States	4:40.22	
3rd place, bronze medalist(s)	8	Kim Seo-yeong	South Korea	4:41.52	
4	3	Sarah Darcel	Canada	4:42.07	
5	2	Brooke Forde	United States	4:44.04	
6	7	Barbora Závadová	Czech Republic	4:44.30	
7	6	Réka György	Hungary	4:44.78	
8	1	Carlotta Toni	Italy	4:47.35	
