= Swimming at the 2017 Summer Universiade – Men's 400 metre individual medley =

Men's 400 metre individual medley at the 2017 Summer Universiade
- Venue: National Taiwan Sport University Arena
- Location: Taipei, Taiwan
- Dates: 26 August (heats and final)
- Competitors: 29 from 20 nations
- Winning time: 4:11.98

Medalists
| gold medal | Daiya Seto | Japan |
| silver medal | Kosuke Hagino | Japan |
| bronze medal | Aleksandr Osipenko | Russia |

The Men's 400 metre individual medley competition at the 2017 Summer Universiade was held on 26 August 2017.

== Records ==
Prior to the competition, the existing world and Universiade records were as follows.

| World record | Michael Phelps (USA) | 4:03.84 | Beijing, China | 10 August 2008 |
| Competition record | Michael Weiss (USA) | 4:12.00 | Kazan, Russia | 16 July 2013 |

The following new records were set during this competition.

| Date | Event | Name | Nationality | Time | Record |
|---|---|---|---|---|---|
| 26 August | Final | Daiya Seto | Japan | 4:11.98 | UR |

== Results ==
=== Heats ===
The heats were held at 9:32.

| Rank | Heat | Lane | Name | Nationality | Time | Notes |
|---|---|---|---|---|---|---|
| 1 | 5 | 6 | Aleksandr Osipenko | Russia | 4:17.63 | Q |
| 2 | 5 | 4 | Daiya Seto | Japan | 4:17.71 | Q |
| 3 | 5 | 5 | Gergely Gyurta | Hungary | 4:18.06 | Q |
| 4 | 5 | 2 | Dawid Szwedzki | Poland | 4:18.43 | Q |
| 5 | 5 | 3 | Sean Grieshop | United States | 4:18.56 | Q |
| 6 | 4 | 4 | Kosuke Hagino | Japan | 4:18.64 | Q |
| 7 | 4 | 7 | Adam Paulsson | Sweden | 4:18.81 | Q |
| 8 | 4 | 5 | Jonathan Roberts | United States | 4:18.82 | Q |
| 9 | 4 | 6 | Tristan Cote | Canada | 4:21.29 | |
| 10 | 5 | 7 | Joe Litchfield | Great Britain | 4:22.09 | |
| 11 | 3 | 2 | Arjan Knipping | Netherlands | 4:23.25 | |
| 12 | 4 | 2 | Luke Reilly | Canada | 4:24.51 | |
| 13 | 3 | 5 | Cho Cheng-chi | Chinese Taipei | 4:24.69 | |
| 14 | 3 | 3 | Claudio Fossi | Italy | 4:24.77 | |
| 15 | 3 | 1 | Thomas Dal | Belgium | 4:27.14 | |
| 16 | 4 | 3 | Kevin Wedel | Germany | 4:28.06 | |
| 17 | 3 | 8 | Neil Fair | South Africa | 4:28.96 | |
| 18 | 3 | 4 | Hector Ruvalcaba Cruz | Mexico | 4:29.02 | |
| 19 | 4 | 8 | William Lulek | Sweden | 4:30.21 | |
| 20 | 5 | 1 | Giovanni Sorriso | Italy | 4:30.59 | |
| 21 | 2 | 4 | Kim Jae-woo | South Korea | 4:31.67 | |
| 22 | 3 | 6 | Wen Ren-hau | Chinese Taipei | 4:32.80 | |
| 23 | 4 | 1 | Dániel Sós | Hungary | 4:34.12 | |
| 24 | 2 | 2 | Teemu Vuorela | Finland | 4:39.17 | |
| 25 | 2 | 6 | Felipe Quiroz Uteau | Chile | 4:39.50 | |
| 26 | 2 | 5 | Eetu Piiroinen | Finland | 4:41.19 | |
| 27 | 1 | 5 | Sherif Assi | Lebanon | 4:54.32 | |
| 28 | 1 | 3 | Enrique Nava Miranda | Bolivia | 5:05.08 | |
| 29 | 1 | 4 | Anthony Ghosn | Lebanon | 5:07.97 | |
| | 2 | 7 | Satrio Gunadi Putra | Indonesia | DNS | |
| | 2 | 3 | Alex Milligan | Australia | DNS | |
| | 3 | 7 | Gabriel Lópes | Portugal | DNS | |
| | 5 | 8 | Andrey Zhilkin | Russia | DNS | |

=== Final ===
The final was held at 19:39.

| Rank | Lane | Name | Nationality | Time | Notes |
|---|---|---|---|---|---|
| 1st place, gold medalist(s) | 5 | Daiya Seto | Japan | 4:11.98 | UR |
| 2nd place, silver medalist(s) | 7 | Kosuke Hagino | Japan | 4:15.44 | |
| 3rd place, bronze medalist(s) | 4 | Aleksandr Osipenko | Russia | 4:16.63 | |
| 4 | 3 | Gergely Gyurta | Hungary | 4:17.70 | |
| 5 | 6 | Dawid Szwedzki | Poland | 4:18.11 | |
| 6 | 1 | Adam Paulsson | Sweden | 4:18.83 | |
| 7 | 2 | Sean Grieshop | United States | 4:21.60 | |
| 8 | 8 | Jonathan Roberts | United States | 4:25.50 | |
