= Swimming at the 2018 Asian Games – Men's 200 metre breaststroke =

Men's 200 metre breaststroke at the 2018 Asian Games
- Venue: Gelora Bung Karno Aquatic Stadium
- Date: 21 August 2018
- Competitors: 21 from 15 nations

Medalists
gold medal	Yasuhiro Koseki	Japan
silver medal	Ippei Watanabe	Japan
bronze medal	Qin Haiyang	China

The men's 200 metre breaststroke event at the 2018 Asian Games took place on 21 August at the Gelora Bung Karno Aquatic Stadium.

== Schedule ==
All times are Western Indonesia Time (UTC+07:00)

Date	Time	Event
Tuesday, 21 August 2018	09:34	Heats
Tuesday, 21 August 2018	18:40	Final

== Records ==
Prior to this competition, the existing world, Asian and Games records were as follows.

World Record	Ippei Watanabe (JPN)	2:06.67	Tokyo, Japan	29 January 2017
Asian Record	Ippei Watanabe (JPN)	2:06.67	Tokyo, Japan	29 January 2017
Games Record	Dmitriy Balandin (KAZ)	2:07.67	Incheon, South Korea	23 September 2014

== Results ==
=== Heats ===
Rank	Heat	Athlete	Time	Notes
1	3	Ippei Watanabe (JPN)	2:11.92	
2	3	Yan Zibei (CHN)	2:12.45	
3	2	Yasuhiro Koseki (JPN)	2:12.77	
4	3	Denis Petrashov (KGZ)	2:12.89	
5	1	Qin Haiyang (CHN)	2:13.51	
6	2	Cho Sung-jae (KOR)	2:14.05	
7	2	Chao Man Hou (MAC)	2:15.34	
8	3	Amro Al-Wir (JOR)	2:16.15	
9	3	Phạm Thanh Bảo (VIE)	2:16.51	
10	1	Kim Jae-youn (KOR)	2:16.83	
10	2	Boris Yang (HKG)	2:16.83	
12	1	Zachary Tan (SGP)	2:17.01	
13	1	Marcus Mok (HKG)	2:17.18	
14	3	Lionel Khoo (SGP)	2:17.62	
15	1	Nuttapong Ketin (THA)	2:18.17	
16	2	Vladislav Mustafin (UZB)	2:19.02	
17	3	Batyr Täçmyradow (TKM)	2:29.15	
18	2	Abdelrahman Hesham Mohamed (QAT)	2:31.22	
19	1	Batmönkhiin Jürmed (MGL)	2:40.71	
20	1	Muhammad Hamza Malik (PAK)	2:40.72	
21	2	Gotsbayaryn Tengis (MGL)	3:11.23	

=== Final ===
Rank	Athlete	Time	Notes
1st place, gold medalist(s)	Yasuhiro Koseki (JPN)	2:07.81	
2nd place, silver medalist(s)	Ippei Watanabe (JPN)	2:07.82	
3rd place, bronze medalist(s)	Qin Haiyang (CHN)	2:08.07	
4	Yan Zibei (CHN)	2:11.07	
5	Denis Petrashov (KGZ)	2:12.19	
6	Cho Sung-jae (KOR)	2:13.86	
7	Chao Man Hou (MAC)	2:15.82	
8	Amro Al-Wir (JOR)	2:17.43	
