= Lithuania at the 2017 Summer Universiade =

- IOC code: LTU
- National federation: Lithuanian Student Sports Federation
- Website: lssa.lt

in Taipei, Taiwan 19 August 2017 – 30 August 2017
- Competitors: 66 (43 men and 23 women) in 7 sports
- Flag bearer: Airinė Palšytė
- Medals: Gold 3 Silver 1 Bronze 3 Total 7

Summer Universiade appearances
- 1959; 1961; 1963; 1965; 1967; 1970; 1973; 1975; 1977; 1979; 1981; 1983; 1985; 1987; 1989; 1991; 1993; 1995; 1997; 1999; 2001; 2003; 2005; 2007; 2009; 2011; 2013; 2015; 2017; 2019; 2021; 2025; 2027

Lithuania participated at the 2017 Summer Universiade in Taipei, Taiwan, from 19 to 30 August 2017.

== Medal summary ==
Medal	Name	Sport	Event
Gold	Danas Rapšys	Swimming	Men's 200m Freestyle
Gold	Danas Rapšys	Swimming	Men's 200m Backstroke
Gold	Men's Team	Basketball	Men's Basketball
Silver	Santa Pakenytė	Judo	Women's +78 kg
Bronze	Danas Rapšys	Swimming	Men's 100m Backstroke
Bronze	Santa Pakenytė	Judo	Women's Open
Bronze	Airinė Palšytė	Athletics	Women's High Jump

== Team ==
Competitors from Lithuania per sport
Sport	Men	Women	Total
Athletics	14	7	21
Basketball	12	11	23
Diving	0	1	1
Gymnastics	2	0	2
Judo	4	2	6
Swimming	5	2	7
Weightlifting	6	0	6
Total	43	23	66

== Athletics ==
=== Track ===
Athlete	Event	Heat		Quarterfinals		Semifinal		Final	
Athlete	Event	Time	Rank	Time	Rank	Time	Rank	Time	Rank
Eva Misiūnaitė	Women's 400 metres	53.64	7th Q	—N/a		53.84	13th	Did not advance	
Monika Elenska	Women's 800 metres	2:11.69	20th Q	—N/a		2:07.62	16th	Did not advance	
Ugnius Savickas	Men's 100 metres	10.81	46th	Did not advance					
Ugnius Savickas	Men's 200 metres	21.66	24th	—N/a		Did not advance			
Kostas Skrabulis	Men's 100 metres	10.55	21st q	10.67	20th	Did not advance			
Kostas Skrabulis	Men's 200 metres	21.69	27th	—N/a		Did not advance			
Rokas Pacevičius	Men's 400 metres	48.27	30th	—N/a		Did not advance			
Benediktas Mickus	Men's 800 metres	1:50.57	3rd Q	—N/a		1:49.35	14th	Did not advance	
Mindaugas Striokas	Men's 800 metres	1:52.27	31st	—N/a		Did not advance			
Simas Bertašius	Men's 1500 metres	3:44.33	4th q	—N/a				3:46.05	7th
Simas Bertašius	Men's 5000 metres	14:39.41	16th	—N/a				Did not advance	
Rapolas Saulius	Men's 110 m hurdles	14.10	11th q	—N/a		14.06	10th	Did not advance	
Justinas Beržanskis	Men's 3000 m steeplechase	—N/a						8:49.46	10th
Marius Šavelskis	Men's 20 kilometres walk	—N/a						DSQ	-

=== Field ===
Athlete	Event	Qualification		Final	
Athlete	Event	Result	Rank	Result	Rank
Airinė Palšytė	Women's high jump	1.80	1 q	1.91	Bronze
Diana Zagainova	Women's triple jump	12.56	15th	Did not advance	
Giedrė Kupstytė	Women's shot put	15.44	13th	Did not advance	
Ieva Zarankaitė	Women's shot put	15.11	15th	Did not advance	
Ieva Zarankaitė	Women's discus throw	45.91	19th	Did not advance	
Liveta Jasiūnaitė	Women's javelin throw	57.43	5th q	57.25	7th
Adrijus Glebauskas	Men's high jump	2.15	9th q	2.23	5th
Šarūnas Banevičius	Men's shot put	19.00	8th q	19.72	6th
Domantas Poška	Men's discus throw	56.70	9th q	57.38	9th
Edis Matusevičius	Men's javelin throw	70.61	18th	Did not advance	
Skirmantas Šimoliūnas	Men's javelin throw	75.28	9h q	74.27	10th

== Basketball ==
Players	Event	Group stage		Placement round			Rank
Players	Event	Opposition Score	Rank	Bracket Opposition Score	Bracket Opposition Score	Bracket Opposition Score	Rank
Dovis Bičkauskis; Paulius Danisevičius; Tomas Dimša; Martinas Geben; Mindaugas Kačinas; Regimantas Miniotas; Martynas Sajus; Evaldas Šaulys; Justas Tamulis; Donatas Tarolis; Ignas Vaitkus; Kristupas Žemaitis	Men's tournament	Israel (ISR); W 79-70	1	Quarterfinal; Argentina (ARG); W 72-70	Semifinal; Latvia (LAT); W 77-75	Final; United States (USA); W 85-74	Gold
Dovis Bičkauskis; Paulius Danisevičius; Tomas Dimša; Martinas Geben; Mindaugas Kačinas; Regimantas Miniotas; Martynas Sajus; Evaldas Šaulys; Justas Tamulis; Donatas Tarolis; Ignas Vaitkus; Kristupas Žemaitis	Men's tournament	Australia (AUS); L 82-84	1	Quarterfinal; Argentina (ARG); W 72-70	Semifinal; Latvia (LAT); W 77-75	Final; United States (USA); W 85-74	Gold
Dovis Bičkauskis; Paulius Danisevičius; Tomas Dimša; Martinas Geben; Mindaugas Kačinas; Regimantas Miniotas; Martynas Sajus; Evaldas Šaulys; Justas Tamulis; Donatas Tarolis; Ignas Vaitkus; Kristupas Žemaitis	Men's tournament	Mozambique (MOZ); W 122-35	1	Quarterfinal; Argentina (ARG); W 72-70	Semifinal; Latvia (LAT); W 77-75	Final; United States (USA); W 85-74	Gold
Dovis Bičkauskis; Paulius Danisevičius; Tomas Dimša; Martinas Geben; Mindaugas Kačinas; Regimantas Miniotas; Martynas Sajus; Evaldas Šaulys; Justas Tamulis; Donatas Tarolis; Ignas Vaitkus; Kristupas Žemaitis	Men's tournament	Ukraine (UKR); W 76-71	1	Quarterfinal; Argentina (ARG); W 72-70	Semifinal; Latvia (LAT); W 77-75	Final; United States (USA); W 85-74	Gold
Dovis Bičkauskis; Paulius Danisevičius; Tomas Dimša; Martinas Geben; Mindaugas Kačinas; Regimantas Miniotas; Martynas Sajus; Evaldas Šaulys; Justas Tamulis; Donatas Tarolis; Ignas Vaitkus; Kristupas Žemaitis	Men's tournament	Russia (RUS); W 112-71	1	Quarterfinal; Argentina (ARG); W 72-70	Semifinal; Latvia (LAT); W 77-75	Final; United States (USA); W 85-74	Gold
Dalia Belickaitė; Agnė Cerneckytė; Gintarė Jasiūnskaitė; Ieva Kazlauskaitė; Rasa Knyžaitė; Šarūnė Melinauskaitė; Roberta Mizgerytė; Martyna Petrenaitė; Ieva Preskienytė; Ieva Savickaitė; Greta Tamašauskaitė	Women's tournament	Australia (AUS); L 71-78	3	9th-16th placement Uganda (UGA); W 92-59	9th-12th placement Portugal (POR); L 54-59	11th-12th placement Argentina (ARG); L 74-89	12th
Dalia Belickaitė; Agnė Cerneckytė; Gintarė Jasiūnskaitė; Ieva Kazlauskaitė; Rasa Knyžaitė; Šarūnė Melinauskaitė; Roberta Mizgerytė; Martyna Petrenaitė; Ieva Preskienytė; Ieva Savickaitė; Greta Tamašauskaitė	Women's tournament	Russia (RUS); L 52-59	3	9th-16th placement Uganda (UGA); W 92-59	9th-12th placement Portugal (POR); L 54-59	11th-12th placement Argentina (ARG); L 74-89	12th
Dalia Belickaitė; Agnė Cerneckytė; Gintarė Jasiūnskaitė; Ieva Kazlauskaitė; Rasa Knyžaitė; Šarūnė Melinauskaitė; Roberta Mizgerytė; Martyna Petrenaitė; Ieva Preskienytė; Ieva Savickaitė; Greta Tamašauskaitė	Women's tournament	Argentina (ARG); W 73-46	3	9th-16th placement Uganda (UGA); W 92-59	9th-12th placement Portugal (POR); L 54-59	11th-12th placement Argentina (ARG); L 74-89	12th

Legend: W = win

== Diving ==
Athlete	Event	Qualification		Semifinal		Final	
Athlete	Event	Result	Rank	Result	Rank	Result	Rank
Indrė Marija Girdauskaitė	Women's 1 m springboard	206.10	24th	Did not advance			
Indrė Marija Girdauskaitė	Women's 3 m springboard	214.30	27th	Did not advance			

== Gymnastics ==
Gymnast	Stage	Apparatus						All-Around
Gymnast	Stage	FX	PH	RG	VT	PB	HB	All-Around
Tomas Kuzmickas	Qualification	14.150; 8th Q	13.150; 29th	13.100; 52nd	13.950	13.975; 19th	13.750; 15th	82.075; 9th Q
Tomas Kuzmickas	Final	13.966; 8th	Did not advance	Did not advance	Did not advance	Did not advance	Did not advance	78.300; 17th
Robert Tvorogal	Qualification	13.700; 15th	12.350; 47th	12.700; 62nd	13.900	13.750; 23rd	13.650; 17th	80.050; 18th Q
Robert Tvorogal	Final	Did not advance	Did not advance	Did not advance	Did not advance	Did not advance	Did not advance	81.650; 10th

Legend: FX = score and rank in floor exercise, PH = score and rank in pommel horse, RG = score and rank in rings, VT = score and rank in vault, PB = score and rank in parallel bars, HB = score and rank in horizontal bar, Q = qualified, R = reserve

== Judo ==
Athlete	Event	1/32 Final	1/16 Final	1/8 Final	1/4 Final	Semifinal	Repechage 32	Repechage 16	Repechage 8	Finals	Rank
Athlete	Event	Opposition Result	Opposition Result	Opposition Result	Opposition Result	Opposition Result	Opposition Result	Opposition Result	Opposition Result	Opposition Result	Rank
Andrej Klokov	Men's -66 kg	—N/a	Barros Navarro (CHI); W 11-00	Flament (FRA); L 00S2-01	Did not advance	Did not advance	Did not advance	Did not advance	Did not advance	Did not advance	
Deividas Tarulis	Men's -73 kg	—N/a	Barros Sinanovic (MNE); W 11-01	Ciloglu (TUR); L 01-02S1	Did not advance	Did not advance	Did not advance	Did not advance	Did not advance	Did not advance	
Rokas Nenartavičius	Men's -90 kg	Retinskii (RUS); L 00S3-010S1	Did not advance	Did not advance	Did not advance	Did not advance	Diesse (FRA); L 00-10	Did not advance	Did not advance	Did not advance	
Žilvinas Lekavičius	Men's -100 kg	—N/a	Iida (JPN); L 00S3-010	Did not advance	Did not advance	Did not advance	—N/a	Kumrić (CRO); L 00-02	Did not advance	Did not advance	
Rokas Nenartavičius	Men's Open	—N/a	Bouhbal (ALG); W 10-00	Knapek (CZE); L 01S1-03S1	Did not advance	Did not advance	Did not advance	Did not advance	Did not advance	Did not advance	
Andrej Klokov; Deividas Tarulis; Rokas Nenartavičius; Žilvinas Lekavičius	Men's Team	—N/a	Bye	ITA L 2-3	Did not advance	Did not advance	Did not advance	Did not advance	Did not advance	Did not advance	
Anastasija Michailova	Women's -57 kg	—N/a	Poonam (IND); W 12-00S1	Bye	Kwom (KOR); L 00-010	Did not advance	—N/a	—N/a	Golomidova (RUS); L 01S1-02	Did not advance	
Santa Pakenytė	Women's +78 kg	—N/a	Bye	Piriyanka (IND); W 10-00	Sun (TPE); W 10-00	Akbulut (TUR); W 01-00S1	—N/a	—N/a	—N/a	Han (KOR); L 00S1-10S1	Silver
Santa Pakenytė	Women's Open	—N/a	Bye	Berlikash (KAZ); W 10-00S3	Akbulut (TUR); W 10S1-00S3	Inoue (JPN); L 00S1-10	—N/a	—N/a	Jacinto Daniel (BRA); W 10-00	Did not advance	Bronze

Legend: W = win

== Swimming ==
Athlete	Event	Heat		Semifinal		Final	
Athlete	Event	Time	Rank	Time	Rank	Time	Rank
Tadas Duškinas	Men's 50 m butterfly	24.37	22nd	Did not advance			
Tadas Duškinas	Men's 100 m butterfly	53.99	31st	Did not advance			
Danas Rapšys	Men's 200 m freestyle	1:49.20	3rd Q	1:47.46	2nd Q	1:45.75 NR	Gold
Danas Rapšys	Men's 100 m backstroke	54.51	3rd Q	54.36	3rd Q	54.17	Bronze
Danas Rapšys	Men's 200 m backstroke	2:00.25	5th Q	1:57.47	1st Q	1:56.52	Gold
Gytis Stankevičius	Men's 50 m backstroke	26.00	22nd	Did not advance			
Gytis Stankevičius	Men's 100 m backstroke	56.54	28th	Did not advance			
Gytis Stankevičius	Men's 200 m backstroke	2:04.10	20th	Did not advance			
Povilas Strazdas	Men's 100 m freestyle	50.92	37th	Did not advance			
Povilas Strazdas	Men's 400 m freestyle	4:00.82	28th	—N/a		Did not advance	
Povilas Strazdas	Men's 200 m individual medley	2:04.54	23rd	Did not advance			
Andrius Šidlauskas	Men's 50 m breaststroke	28.18	11th Q	28.04	12th	Did not advance	
Andrius Šidlauskas	Men's 100 m breaststroke	1:01.29	9th Q	1:01.05	7th Q	1:00.95	7th
Andrius Šidlauskas	Men's 200 m breaststroke	2:18.87	33rd	Did not advance			
Tadas Duškinas; Danas Rapšys; Andrius Šidlauskas; Povilas Strazdas	Men's 4 × 100 m medley relay	3:37.51	2nd Q	—N/a		3:37.37	7th
Ugnė Mažutaitytė	Women's 100 m backstroke	1:03.40	27th	Did not advance			
Ugnė Mažutaitytė	Women's 200 m backstroke	2:15.34	17th R	2:14.87	14th	Did not advance	
Viktė Labanauskaitė	Women's 400 m freestyle	4:32.02	30th	—N/a		Did not advance	
Viktė Labanauskaitė	Women's 100 m breaststroke	1:13.10	28th	Did not advance			
Viktė Labanauskaitė	Women's 200 m breaststroke	2:37.99	24th	Did not advance			

== Weightlifting ==
Lifter	Event	Snatch		Clean & Jerk		Total	Rank
Lifter	Event	Result	Rank	Result	Rank	Total	Rank
Vincentas Skirka	Men's 69 kg	112	17th	127	17th	239	17th
Laurynas Antanaitis	Men's 85 kg	131	15th	150	15th	281	15th
Aurimas Didžbalis	Men's 94 kg	175	1st	205	4th	380	4th
Žygimantas Stanulis	Men's 94 kg	170	2nd	192	10th	362	5th
Sergej Lichovoj	Men's 105 kg	158	6th	187	9th	345	7th
Tomas Li Cin Chai	Men's 105 kg	151	11th	182	11th	333	11th
