= Gymnastics at the 2017 Summer Universiade – Women's artistic team all-around =

Women's artistic team all-around at the XXIX Summer Universiade
- Venue: Taipei Nangang Exhibition Center, Hall 1, 4F
- Dates: 21 August
- Competitors: 70 from 26 nations

Medalists
| 1st place, gold medalist(s) | | Lilia Akhaimova; Daria Elizarova; Maria Paseka; Evgeniya Shelgunova; Daria Spiridonova | Russia |
| 2nd place, silver medalist(s) | | Ellie Black; Jessica Dowling; Denelle Pedrick; Brittany Rogers; Briannah Tsang | Canada |
| 3rd place, bronze medalist(s) | | Yumika nakamura Natsumi Sasada; Asuka Teramoto; Ayana Tone; Yuki Uchiyama | Japan |

The women's artistic team all-around gymnastics event at the 2017 Summer Universiade on August 21 at the Taipei Nangang Exhibition Center, Hall 1, 4F in Taipei, Taiwan.

== Final results ==
| Qualified for the individual all-around final |
| Reserve for the individual all-around final |

| Team | Vault (gymnastics) | | Uneven bars | | Balance beam | | Floor (gymnastics) | | Total (All-around) | |
| Team | Score | Rank | Score | Rank | Score | Rank | Score | Rank | Score | Rank |
| Russia | 43.100 | 1 | 40.400 | 1 | 39.350 | 2 | 40.150 | 1 | 163.000 | 1st place, gold medalist(s) |
|---|---|---|---|---|---|---|---|---|---|---|
| Lilia Akhaimova (RUS) | 14.450 | 3 | | | 12.300 | 18 | 13.600 | 3 | 40.350 | 46 |
| Darya Elizarova (RUS) | | | 12.850 | 14 | 12.600 | 13 | 13.850 | 1 | 39.300 | 48 |
| Maria Paseka (RUS) | 15.000 | 1 | 12.700 | 15 | | | | | 27.700 | 55 |
| Evgeniya Shelgunova (RUS) | 13.500 | 17 | 13.650 | 5 | 13.500 | 2 | 12.200 | 23 | 52.850 | 6 |
| Daria Spiridonova (RUS) | 13.650 | 14 | 13.950 | 2 | 13.250 | 7 | 12.700 | 12 | 53.500 | 4 |
| Canada | 42.750 | 2 | 39.350 | 4 | 40.475 | 1 | 38.525 | 3 | 161.100 | 2nd place, silver medalist(s) |
| Ellie Black (CAN) | 14.650 | 2 | 13.550 | 6 | 14.400 | 1 | 13.450 | 4 | 56.050 | 1 |
| Jessica Dowling (CAN) | | | 12.900 | 12 | | | 12.050 | 26 | 24.950 | 59 |
| Denelle Pedrick (CAN) | | | | | 12.750 | 11 | 12.525 | 15 | 25.275 | 58 |
| Brittany Rogers (CAN) | 14.400 | 6 | 12.900 | 13 | 13.225 | 8 | | | 40.525 | 45 |
| Briannah Tsang (CAN) | 13.700 | 11 | 10.450 | 42 | 12.850 | 10 | 12.550 | 14 | 49.550 | 13 |
| Japan | 41.550 | 3 | 40.100 | 2 | 39.350 | 2 | 38.900 | 2 | 159.900 | 3rd place, bronze medalist(s) |
| Yumika Nakamura (JPN) | | | 13.350 | 7 | 11.700 | 28 | 12.450 | 18 | 37.500 | 50 |
| Natsumi Sasada (JPN) | 13.650 | 14 | 13.050 | 9 | 13.300 | 4 | 12.900 | 8 | 53.650 | 5 |
| Asuka Teramoto (JPN) | 14.450 | 3 | 12.700 | 15 | 13.300 | 4 | 13.200 | 5 | 53.650 | 3 |
| Ayana Tone (JPN) | 13.450 | 20 | | | 12.750 | 11 | | | 26.200 | 56 |
| Yuki Uchiyama (JPN) | 13.450 | 20 | 13.700 | 4 | | | 12.800 | 9 | 39.950 | 47 |
| Germany | 39.550 | 5 | 39.400 | 3 | 36.650 | 4 | 38.150 | 4 | 153.750 | 4 |
| Antonia Alicke (GER) | 12.850 | 33 | | | 10.650 | 45 | 12.300 | 21 | 35.800 | 52 |
| Kim Bùi (GER) | | | 13.800 | 3 | 12.350 | 17 | | | 26.150 | 57 |
| Leah Grießer (GER) | 13.000 | 30 | 13.250 | 8 | 12.000 | 22 | 12.900 | 7 | 51.150 | 9 |
| Pauline Tratz (GER) | 13.700 | 11 | 12.350 | 20 | 12.300 | 18 | 12.950 | 6 | 51.300 | 8 |
| Netherlands | 40.900 | 4 | 36.600 | 5 | 33.800 | 8 | 37.650 | 5 | 148.950 | 5 |
| Elze Geurts (NED) | 13.950 | 8 | 11.700 | 26 | 10.450 | 52 | 11.850 | 33 | 47.950 | 20 |
| Anne Klein (NED) | 13.500 | 17 | 11.100 | 36 | 10.900 | 43 | 12.500 | 16 | 48.000 | 19 |
| Denise Tan (NED) | | | 12.600 | 17 | 10.500 | 50 | 12.750 | 10 | 35.850 | 51 |
| Nadieh van Pol (NED) | 13.250 | 27 | | | | | | | 13.250 | 67 |
| Vera van Pol (NED) | 13.450 | 20 | 12.300 | 21 | 12.400 | 16 | 12.400 | 19 | 50.550 | 10 |
| Chinese Taipei | 39.150 | 6 | 34.225 | 6 | 33.550 | 11 | 35.800 | 7 | 142.725 | 6 |
| Chuang Hsiu-ju (TPE) | 12.600 | 41 | 11.325 | 33 | 11.150 | 40 | 11.750 | 35 | 46.825 | 23 |
| Chuang Shu-yun (TPE) | | | | | 11.100 | 41 | 11.700 | 38 | 22.800 | 63 |
| Lo Yu-ju (TPE) | 13.500 | 17 | 9.200 | 52 | | | | | 22.700 | 64 |
| Mai Liu Hsiang-han (TPE) | 12.850 | 33 | 11.700 | 26 | 11.300 | 37 | 12.350 | 20 | 48.200 | 18 |
| Tsai Chia-jung (TPE) | 12.800 | 36 | 11.200 | 34 | 10.500 | 49 | 11.600 | 40 | 46.100 | 27 |
| Portugal | 37.100 | 10 | 31.600 | 10 | 35.500 | 6 | 35.850 | 6 | 140.050 | 7 |
| Diana Abrantes (POR) | 11.550 | 52 | 9.350 | 49 | 11.300 | 35 | 11.500 | 43 | 43.700 | 39 |
| Ana Filipa Martins (POR) | 13.400 | 25 | 12.450 | 18 | 13.000 | 9 | 12.700 | 11 | 51.550 | 7 |
| Inês Romero (POR) | 12.150 | 48 | 9.800 | 46 | 11.200 | 38 | 11.650 | 39 | 44.800 | 34 |
| South Korea | 37.250 | 9 | 32.450 | 8 | 35.700 | 5 | 33.800 | 12 | 139.200 | 8 |
| Eun Da-yeon (KOR) | 12.650 | 39 | 11.350 | 32 | 11.800 | 25 | 10.850 | 50 | 46.650 | 25 |
| Jeong Hee-yeon (KOR) | | | 8.900 | 53 | 9.450 | 60 | | | 18.350 | 66 |
| Jung Choong-min (KOR) | 12.650 | 39 | | | | | 11.400 | 46 | 24.050 | 62 |
| Kim Chae-yeon (KOR) | 11.550 | 52 | 9.600 | 48 | 12.150 | 20 | 10.450 | 54 | 43.750 | 38 |
| Lee Hye-been (KOR) | 11.950 | 50 | 11.500 | 30 | 11.750 | 27 | 11.550 | 41 | 46.750 | 24 |
| Finland | 37.400 | 8 | 33.500 | 7 | 33.800 | 8 | 34.025 | 11 | 138.725 | 9 |
| Maija Karoliina Leinonen (FIN) | 12.850 | 33 | 11.750 | 25 | 12.450 | 15 | 11.900 | 30 | 48.950 | 15 |
| Annika Kristiin Urvikko (FIN) | 13.400 | 25 | 10.850 | 38 | 11.350 | 34 | 11.750 | 37 | 47.350 | 22 |
| Veronika Vuosjoki (FIN) | 11.150 | 56 | 10.900 | 37 | 10.000 | 54 | 10.375 | 55 | 42.425 | 44 |
| Norway | 36.400 | 11 | 32.300 | 9 | 34.200 | 7 | 34.300 | 9 | 137.200 | 10 |
| Sofie Braaten (NOR) | 12.300 | 44 | 10.550 | 40 | 11.800 | 26 | 11.900 | 31 | 46.550 | 26 |
| Mira Neurauter (NOR) | | | 10.300 | 43 | 10.600 | 47 | 10.950 | 49 | 31.850 | 53 |
| Thea Nygaard (NOR) | | | | | | | | | | |
| Sofie Skåttun (NOR) | 12.300 | 44 | 11.450 | 31 | 10.400 | 53 | 11.450 | 45 | 45.600 | 29 |
| Anna Worpvik (NOR) | 11.800 | 51 | 9.650 | 47 | 11.800 | 24 | 10.750 | 52 | 44.000 | 37 |
| South Africa | 38.750 | 7 | 30.400 | 11 | 33.200 | 12 | 34.200 | 10 | 136.550 | 11 |
| Claudia Jane Cummins (RSA) | 13.450 | 20 | 7.800 | 56 | 11.200 | 39 | 12.200 | 22 | 44.650 | 36 |
| Tylah Ann Lotter (RSA) | | | | | 11.350 | 33 | 11.000 | 47 | 22.350 | 65 |
| Angela Hilda Maguire (RSA) | 12.750 | 38 | 10.750 | 39 | 10.500 | 51 | 11.000 | 48 | 45.000 | 31 |
| Bianca Fallon Mann (RSA) | 12.550 | 42 | 11.850 | 24 | 10.650 | 46 | 10.800 | 51 | 45.850 | 28 |
| Slovenia | 35.050 | 12 | 30.325 | 12 | 33.750 | 10 | 35.000 | 8 | 134.125 | 12 |
| Ana Cikač (SLO) | 11.450 | 54 | 7.900 | 55 | 9.550 | 59 | | | 28.900 | 54 |
| Ivana Kamnikar (SLO) | 11.400 | 55 | 11.900 | 23 | 9.850 | 56 | 12.000 | 28 | 45.150 | 30 |
| Sara King (SLO) | 12.200 | 47 | 10.525 | 41 | 10.650 | 44 | 11.500 | 42 | 44.875 | 33 |
| Adela Šajn (SLO) | | | | | 13.250 | 6 | 11.500 | 43 | 24.750 | 60 |
Individual
| Larisa Iordache (ROU) | 14.450 | 3 | 14.150 | 1 | 13.450 | 3 | 13.650 | 2 | 55.770 | 2 |
| Gabriela Janik (POL) | 13.750 | 9 | 13.050 | 10 | 11.650 | 29 | 11.750 | 36 | 50.200 | 11 |
| Barbora Mokosova (SVK) | 13.700 | 11 | 12.900 | 11 | 11.300 | 36 | 12.100 | 25 | 50.000 | 12 |
| Jasmin Mader (AUT) | 13.450 | 20 | 12.400 | 19 | 11.450 | 32 | 11.800 | 34 | 49.100 | 14 |
| Dalia Al-Salty (HUN) | 12.900 | 32 | 11.550 | 29 | 12.500 | 14 | 11.900 | 32 | 48.850 | 16 |
| Dorien Eva Motten (BEL) | 13.750 | 9 | 12.250 | 22 | 9.700 | 57 | 12.500 | 17 | 48.200 | 17 |
| Demet Mutlu (TUR) | 13.150 | 28 | 11.200 | 35 | 11.050 | 42 | 12.150 | 24 | 47.550 | 21 |
| Yamilet Peña (DOM) | 14.000 | 7 | 9.250 | 51 | 9.700 | 57 | 11.950 | 29 | 44.900 | 32 |
| Yekaterina Chuikina (KAZ) | 12.550 | 42 | 9.950 | 45 | 11.900 | 23 | 10.300 | 57 | 44.700 | 35 |
| Caterina Barloggio (SUI) | 10.800 | 57 | 8.300 | 54 | 12.150 | 20 | 12.050 | 27 | 43.300 | 40 |
| Tatiana Avila (ARG) | 12.300 | 44 | 10.000 | 44 | 9.950 | 55 | 10.350 | 56 | 42.600 | 41 |
| Kwan Sau Chung (HKG) | 12.150 | 48 | 9.300 | 50 | 10.525 | 48 | 10.600 | 53 | 42.575 | 42 |
| Anna Geidt (KAZ) | 12.800 | 36 | 11.600 | 28 | 8.400 | 61 | 9.650 | 58 | 42.450 | 43 |
| Dorina Böczögő (HUN) | 13.600 | 16 | | | 11.500 | 30 | 12.650 | 13 | 37.750 | 49 |
| Valerija Grisane (LAT) | 13.050 | 29 | | | 11.475 | 31 | | | 24.525 | 61 |
| Ema Kajic (CRO) | 13.000 | 30 | | | | | | | 13.000 | 68 |
| Kelly Simm (GBR) | | | | | | | | | | |
