= Athletics at the 2017 Summer Universiade – Women's 20 kilometres walk =

The women's 20 kilometres walk event at the 2017 Summer Universiade was held on 26 August at the Taipei Municipal Stadium.

== Medalists ==
=== Individual ===
Gold	Silver	Bronze
Inna Kashyna; Ukraine	Zhang Xin; China	Elisa Neuvonen; Finland

=== Team ===
Gold	Silver	Bronze
Ukraine; Inna Kashyna; Alina Tsvilii; Valentyna Myronchuk; Tamara Havryliuk	China; Zhang Xin; Zhao Huimin; Zhang Yan; Ma Yiming	None Awarded

== Results ==
=== Individual ===
Rank	Name	Nationality	Time	Penalties	Notes
1st place, gold medalist(s)	Inna Kashyna	Ukraine	1:39:44		
2nd place, silver medalist(s)	Zhang Xin	China	1:41:18	~	
3rd place, bronze medalist(s)	Elisa Neuvonen	Finland	1:42:50		
4	Rita Récsei	Hungary	1:43:46	~	
5	Mara Ribeiro	Portugal	1:44:14		
6	Anel Oosthuizen	South Africa	1:44:41	~	
7	Alina Tsvilii	Ukraine	1:45:25	>>	
8	Zhao Huimin	China	1:45:48		
9	Valentyna Myronchuk	Ukraine	1:46:52		
10	Polina Repina	Kazakhstan	1:51:00		
11	Tamara Havryliuk	Ukraine	1:51:21		
12	Chang Chia-feng	Chinese Taipei	1:51:31	~	
13	Zhang Yan	China	1:52:06	~	
14	Carolina Marino	Colombia	1:53:39		
15	Elizabeth Capioso	Philippines	2:14:24		
	Sandy Karam	Lebanon	DNF		
	Ma Yiming	China	DNF		
	Barbara Kovács	Hungary	DQ	~~~	
	Jessica Pickles	Australia	DQ	~~>	
	Katja Ponikvar	Slovenia	DQ	>>>	
	Priyanka Goswami	India	DQ	>>>	

=== Team ===
Rank	Team	Time	Notes
1st place, gold medalist(s)	Ukraine	5:12:01	
2nd place, silver medalist(s)	China	5:19:12	
