= Basketball at the 2017 Summer Universiade =

Basketball at the XXIX Summer Universiade
- Venue: various
- Dates: 20–29 August 2017
- Teams: 24 (men); 16 (women)

Basketball was contested at the 2017 Summer Universiade from August 20 to 29 in Taipei, Taiwan.

== Medal summary ==
=== Medal table ===
Rank	Nation	Gold	Silver	Bronze	Total
1	Australia (AUS)	1	0	0	1
1	Lithuania (LTU)	1	0	0	1
3	Japan (JPN)	0	1	0	1
3	United States (USA)	0	1	0	1
5	Chinese Taipei (TPE)*	0	0	1	1
5	Latvia (LAT)	0	0	1	1
Totals (6 entries)		2	2	2	6

=== Medal events ===
Event	Gold	Silver	Bronze
Men	Lithuania (LTU); Dovis Bičkauskis; Justas Tamulis; Evaldas Šaulys; Kristupas Žemaitis; Regimantas Miniotas; Paulius Danisevičius; Martinas Geben; Martynas Sajus; Donatas Tarolis; Ignas Vaitkus; Mindaugas Kačinas; Tomas Dimša	United States (USA); Aaron Wheeler; Carsen Edwards; Eden Ewing; LaSalle Thompson IV; Vincent Edwards; Ryan Cline; Nojel Eastern; Jacquil Taylor; Grady Eifert; Dakota Mathias; Isaac Haas; Sasha Stefanovic	Latvia (LAT); Renars Birkans; Linards Jaunzems; Marts Ozolinkevičs; Rihards Bērziņš; Roberts Krūmiņš; Kārlis Lasmanis; Kristaps Pļavnieks; Pēteris Rēķis; Guntis Sīpoliņš; Daniels Minajevs; Jānis Eiduks; Edgars Lasenbergs
Women	Australia (AUS); Aimie Clydesdale; Vanessa Panousis; Megan McKay; Lauren Scherf; Alex Wilson; Alexandra Sharp; Carly Turner; Keely Froling; Chelsea Brook; Abigail Wehrung; Darcee Garbin; Kristy Wallace	Japan (JPN); Midori Murayama; Manami Fujioka; Mirai Tamura; Shiori Yasuma; Nozomi Kato; Saki Hayashi; Yuriko Tsumura; Nichika Taniguchi; Mamiko Tanaka; Mina Ogasawara; Tamami Nakada; Aki Fujimoto	Chinese Taipei (TPE); Lo Pin; Che Yen-yu; Chen Wei-an; Yang Cing; Hsu Yu-lien; Han Ya-en; Wang Wei-lin; Huang Hsiang-ting; Cheng I-hsiu; Huang Ling-chuan; Lin Yu-ting; Chu Yu-chin

== Men ==
24 teams participated in the men's tournament.

=== Teams ===
Pool A

- Chinese Taipei
- Serbia
- South Korea
- Mexico
- Hungary
- Latvia

Pool B

- Germany
- Canada
- Finland
- Japan
- Norway
- Hong Kong

Pool C

- United States
- Estonia
- Romania
- Czech Republic
- United Arab Emirates
- Argentina

Pool D

- Russia
- Lithuania
- Australia
- Ukraine
- Israel
- Mozambique

== Women ==
16 teams participated in the women's tournament.

=== Teams ===
Pool A

- Chinese Taipei
- Hungary
- Sweden
- Chile

Pool B

- Canada
- Japan
- South Korea
- Portugal

Pool C

- United States
- Czech Republic
- Poland
- Uganda

Pool D

- Russia
- Australia
- Lithuania
- Argentina
