= Andrew Wilson (swimmer) =

American swimmer

Personal information
- Nationality: American
- Born: September 16, 1993 (age 32) London, England
- Height: 6 ft 0 in (182.9 cm)

Sport
- Sport: Swimming
- Strokes: Breaststroke
- Club: Nation's Capital Swim Club
- College team: Emory University
Medal record
Men's swimming
Representing United States
Event	1st	2nd	3rd
Olympic Games	1	0	0
World Championships (LC)	0	2	0
World Championships (SC)	1	1	0
Pan Pacific Championships	1	0	0
Total	3	3	0
Olympic Games
Gold medal – first place	2020 Tokyo	4×100 m medley
World Championships (LC)
Silver medal – second place	2019 Gwangju	4×100 m medley
Silver medal – second place	2019 Gwangju	4×100 m mixed medley
World Championships (SC)
Gold medal – first place	2018 Hangzhou	4×100 m medley
Silver medal – second place	2018 Hangzhou	4×50 m medley
Pan Pacific Championships
Gold medal – first place	2018 Tokyo	4×100 m medley
Summer Universiade
Gold medal – first place	2017 Taipei	100 m breaststroke
Gold medal – first place	2017 Taipei	200 m breaststroke
Gold medal – first place	2017 Taipei	4×100 m medley

Andrew Wilson (born September 16, 1993) is a retired American swimmer. At the 2020 Summer Olympics, he placed 6th in the 100 meter breaststroke, 17th in the 200 meter breaststroke, and won a gold medal in the 4x100 meter medley relay, for his efforts in the prelims of the relay.

== Background ==
Wilson graduated from Phillips Academy in 2012 and Emory University in 2017, where he was a non-recruited member of the swim team.

== Swimming career ==
=== 2019 World Championships ===
Wilson competed in the 100 meter breaststroke at the 2019 World Aquatics Championships.

=== 2021 ===
==== 2020 US Olympic Trials ====
In June 2021, he placed second at the 2020 US Olympic Team Trials in the final of the 100 meter breaststroke with a time of 58.74, qualifying for the 2020 Olympic Games in the event. He finished second in the 200 meter breaststroke as well, with a time of 2:08.32 and qualified for the US Olympic Swimming Team in his second individual event.

==== 2020 Summer Olympics ====
At the 2020 Summer Olympics in Tokyo, Japan, Wilson competed in the 100 meter breaststroke, 4x100 meter mixed medley relay, and the 4x100 meter medley relay.

In the 100 meter breaststroke, Wilson finished sixth in the final of the event on day three of competition with a time of 58.99. In the prelims of the 200 meter breaststroke, he ranked 17th with a time of 2:09.97 and did not advance to the semifinals.

Wilson competed in the first race where men and women competed alongside each other in the pool in the same swimming event at an Olympic Games, the prelims of the 4x100 meter mixed medley relay. Along with his relay teammates Tom Shields, Regan Smith, and Abbey Weitzeil, the relay finished second overall and advanced to the final.

On day seven, Wilson swam the breaststroke leg of the 4x100 meter medley relay in the prelims, with Hunter Armstrong swimming backstroke, Tom Shields butterfly, and Blake Pieroni freestyle, the four advanced the relay to the final of the event, ranking seventh overall. The finals relay finished first in the final on the last day of competition and Wilson won a gold medal with the finals relay and other prelims relay swimmers for his contribution.
