= Belarus at the 2017 Summer Universiade =

- IOC code: BLR
- NOC: Belarus Olympic Committee

in Taipei, Taiwan 19 – 30 August 2017
- Competitors: 34 in 9 sports
- Medals Ranked 22nd: Gold 3 Silver 4 Bronze 2 Total 9

Summer Universiade appearances
- 1959; 1961; 1963; 1965; 1967; 1970; 1973; 1975; 1977; 1979; 1981; 1983; 1985; 1987; 1989; 1991; 1993; 1995; 1997; 1999; 2001; 2003; 2005; 2007; 2009; 2011; 2013; 2015; 2017; 2019; 2021; 2025; 2027

Belarus participated at the 2017 Summer Universiade in Taipei, Taiwan with 34 competitors in 9 sports.

== Competitors and medalists ==
Sport	Men	Women	Total
Athletics	3	4	7
Fencing	0	4	4
Rhythmic gymnastics	0	2	2
Roller sports	1	0	1
Swimming	6	1	7
Table tennis	0	4	4
Taekwondo	3	0	3
Weightlifting	2	1	3
Wushu	2	1	3
Total	17	17	34

Medals by sport
Sport	1st place, gold medalist(s)	2nd place, silver medalist(s)	3rd place, bronze medalist(s)	Total
Swimming	2	0	0	2
Athletics	1	3	0	4
Weightlifting	0	1	0	1
Rhythmic gymnastics	0	0	2	2
Total	3	4	2	9

== Results ==
=== Men's Athletics ===
==== Field Events ====
Athlete	Event	Qualification		Final	
Athlete	Event	Distance (m)	Position	Distance (m)	Position
Pavel Bareisha	Hammer	70.29	2Q	77.98	2nd place, silver medalist(s)
Aliaksei Nichypar	Shot put	19.41	4Q	20.09	4

==== Combined Events ====
===== Decathlon =====
Athlete		100 m	LJ	SP	HJ	400 m	110H	DT	PV	JT	1500 m	Total	Position
Maksim Andraloits	Result	11.14	6.93	13.66	1.95	49.38	14.84	43.31	4.50	51.53	4:59.34	-	4
Maksim Andraloits	Points	830	797	708	758	843	869	732	760	611	564	7472	4

=== Women's Athletics ===
==== Track Events ====
Athlete	Event	Round 1		Round 2		Semifinal		Final	
Athlete	Event	Result	Rank	Result	Rank	Result	Rank	Result	Rank
Elvira Herman	100m hurdles	13.22	1Q	—N/a		13.31	1Q	13.17	2nd place, silver medalist(s)

==== Field Events ====
Athlete	Event	Qualification		Final	
Athlete	Event	Result	Position	Result	Position
Viktoryia Kolb	Shot put	16.40	3Q	16.58	8
Hanna Malyshchyk	Hammer	68.07	2Q	74.93	2nd place, silver medalist(s)
Iryna Zhuk	Pole vault	4.00	=1Q	4.40	1st place, gold medalist(s)

=== Fencing ===
Athlete	Event	Round of 64	Round of 32	Round of 16	Quarterfinal	Semifinal	Final / BM	
Athlete	Event	Opposition Score	Opposition Score	Opposition Score	Opposition Score	Opposition Score	Opposition Score	Rank
Darya Andreyeva	Women's Sabre Individual	Bye	S. Bhavani Devi Chadalavada Anandha (IND); W 15-9	Anna Marton (HUN); L 11-15	—N/a			9
Palina Kaspiarovich	Women's Sabre Individual	Bye	Yana Obvintseva (RUS); L 9-15	—N/a				21
Alisa Utlik	Women's Sabre Individual	Bye	Caroline Queroli (FRA); L 7-15	—N/a				44
Darya Andreyeva; Hanna Ivanishchanka; Palina Kaspiarovich; Alisa Utlik	Women's Sabre Team	—N/a		United States of America (USA); L 29-45	—N/a			9

=== Gymnastics ===
==== Rhythmic ====
Athlete	Event	Apparatus					
Athlete	Event	Hoop	Ball	Clubs	Ribbon	Total	Rank
Hanna Bazhko	Individual All-Around	15.300	16.575	16.025	14.800	62.700	3rd place, bronze medalist(s)
Hanna Bazhko	Individual Ball	—N/a	14.800	—N/a		14.800	7
Hanna Bazhko	Individual Clubs	—N/a		13.600	—N/a	13.600	8
Hanna Bazhko	Individual Ribbon	—N/a			14.000	14.000	6
Mariya Trubach	Individual All-Around	15.750	15.600	16.150	13.550	61.050	5
Mariya Trubach	Individual Hoop	15.300	—N/a			15.300	5
Mariya Trubach	Individual Ball	—N/a	16.450	—N/a		16.450	3rd place, bronze medalist(s)
Mariya Trubach	Individual Clubs	—N/a		15.825	—N/a	15.825	4

=== Roller Sports ===
==== Men's ====
Athlete	Event	Preliminary		Semifinal		Final	
Athlete	Event	Time	Rank	Time	Rank	Time/Points	Rank
Anton Kapustsin	10000m Points-Elimination	—N/a				EL	22
Anton Kapustsin	1000m Sprint	—N/a		1:36.452	8	—N/a	
Anton Kapustsin	15000m Elimination	—N/a				EL	5
Anton Kapustsin	500m Sprint	DNS	—N/a				
Anton Kapustsin	Marathon	—N/a				DNF	—N/a

=== Men's Swimming ===
Athlete	Event	Heat		Semifinal		Final	
Athlete	Event	Time	Rank	Time	Rank	Time	Rank
Yahor Dodaleu	50m butterfly	23.96	3	DNS	—N/a		
Yahor Dodaleu	100m butterfly	53.80	8	—N/a			
Viktar Krasochka	100m freestyle	50.82	5	—N/a			
Viktar Krasochka	50m freestyle	23.36	7	—N/a			
Anton Latkin	100m freestyle	50.95	2	—N/a			
Anton Latkin	50m freestyle	22.70	2	—N/a			
Ilya Shymanovich	100m breaststroke	1:00.62	1	1:00.65	2	1:00.15	1st place, gold medalist(s)
Ilya Shymanovich	200m breaststroke	2:15.30	8	—N/a			
Ilya Shymanovich	50m breaststroke	27.42	1	27.46	1	27.39	1st place, gold medalist(s)
Viktar Staselovich	100m backstroke	56.74	8	—N/a			
Viktar Staselovich	50m backstroke	25.53	5	25.40	4	—N/a	
Mikita Tsmyh	100m backstroke	55.49	7	55.08	6	—N/a	
Mikita Tsmyh	50m backstroke	25.17	1	25.43	5	—N/a	
Mikita Tsmyh	200m backstroke	2:00.46	2	2:02.22	7	—N/a	
Anton Latkin; Viktar Krascha; Ilya Shymanovich; Viktar Staselovich; Yahoo Dodaleu; Mikita Tsmyh	4x100m freestyle relay	3:23.07	7	—N/a			
Anton Latkin; Viktar Krascha; Ilya Shymanovich; Viktar Staselovich; Yahoo Dodaleu; Mikita Tsmyh	4x100m medley relay	3:39.32	5	—N/a			

=== Women's Swimming ===
Athlete	Event	Heat		Semifinal		Final	
Athlete	Event	Time	Rank	Time	Rank	Time	Rank
Nastassia Karakouskaya	50m butterfly	27.31	7	27.35	7	—N/a	
Nastassia Karakouskaya	50m freestyle	25.73	3	25.61	7	—N/a	

== Table Tennis ==
Athlete	Event	Group Stage			Round of 128	Round of 64	Round of 32	Round of 16	Quarterfinals	Semifinals	Final / BM	
Athlete	Event	Opposition Result	Opposition Result	Opposition Result	Opposition Result	Opposition Result	Opposition Result	Opposition Result	Opposition Result	Opposition Result	Opposition Result	Rank
Alina Arlouskaya	Women's Singles	Memory Chikusi (ZAM); W 3-0	Tamara Tomanova (CZE); W 3-0	—N/a		Erica Shen-Ning Wu (USA); W 4-1	Song I Kim (PRK); L 0-4	—N/a				
Katsiaryna Baravok	Women's Singles	Yeongeun An (KOR); L 1-3	Nam Hae Kim (PRK); L 0-3	—N/a								
Alina Nikitchanka	Women's Singles	Yvonne Kaiser (GER); W 3-0	Athena Comaingking (PHI); W 3-1	—N/a		Yu-Hsin Liu (TPE); L 0-4	—N/a					
Hanna Patseyeva	Women's Singles	Kasuni Himaya Pitigala (SRI); W 3-0	Anqi Luo (PHI); L 0-3	—N/a		Jihee Jeon (KOR); L 0-4	—N/a					
Arlouskaya/Baravok	Women's Doubles	—N/a				Kim/Kim (KOR); L 0-3	—N/a					
Nikitchanka/Patseyeva	Women's Doubles	—N/a				Jonsson/ Zetterstroem (SWE); W 3-0	Chong/Kuok (MAC); W 3-0	Cheng/Liu (TPE); L 0-3	—N/a			
Arlouskaya; Baravok; Nikitchanka; Patseyeva	Women's Team	Republic of Korea (KOR); L 0-3	New Zealand (NZL); W 3-0	France (FRA); L 0-3	—N/a							

=== Taekwondo ===
Athlete	Event	Round of 64	Round of 32	Round of 16	Quarterfinals	Semifinals	Final / BM	
Athlete	Event	Opposition Result	Opposition Result	Opposition Result	Opposition Result	Opposition Result	Opposition Result	Rank
Uladzislau Halizin	Men's -74 kg	Muhammed Emin Yildiz (TUR); L 16-17	—N/a					
Aleh Satsyk	Men's -68 kg	Bye	Si Mohamed Ketbi (BEL); L 5-16	—N/a				
Barys Smychkou	Men's -80 kg	Bye	Richard Andre K Ordemann (NOR); L 9-13	—N/a				

=== Weightlifting ===
Athlete	Event	Snatch		Clean & Jerk		Total	Rank
Athlete	Event	Result	Rank	Result	Rank	Total	Rank
Pavel Khadasevich	Men's 85 kg	160	4	190	5	350	4
Yauheni Tsikhantsou	Men's 94 kg	165	6	197	5	362	6
Darya Naumava	Women's 75 kg	105	2	135	2	240	2nd place, silver medalist(s)

=== Wushu ===
Athlete	Event	Quarterfinals	Semifinals	Final	
Athlete	Event	Opposition Result	Opposition Result	Opposition Result	Rank
Palina Kazhyna	Women's Sanda - 52 kg	Arezou Salimighalehtaki (IRI); L 0-2	—N/a		
Dzianis Maher	Men's Sanda - 80 kg	Yavuz Selim Kazanci (TUR); L 0-2	—N/a		
Yauhen Sliaptsou	Men's Sanda - 70 kg	Karapet Tevosyan (ARM); L DNF-0	—N/a		
