= Inna Loseva =

Ukrainian athlete

Personal information
- Born: Inna Kashyna; 27 September 1991 (age 34)

Sport
- Sport: Track and field
- Event: 20 kilometres race walk

Inna Loseva (née Kashyna) (born 27 September 1991) is a Ukrainian race walker. She competed in the women's 20 kilometres walk event at the 2016 Summer Olympics. In 2018, she competed in the women's 20 kilometres walk event at the 2018 European Athletics Championships held in Berlin, Germany. She finished in 7th place.

In 2019, she competed in the women's 20 kilometres walk event at the 2019 World Athletics Championships held in Doha, Qatar. She finished in 29th place.
