= George Schroder =

New Zealand swimmer

Personal information
- Nationality: New Zealand
- Born: 3 September 1995 (age 30)

Sport
- Sport: Swimming

George Schroder (born 3 September 1995) is a New Zealand swimmer. He competed in the men's 100 metre breaststroke event at the 2018 FINA World Swimming Championships (25 m), in Hangzhou, China.
