= Tanja Kylliäinen =

Finnish swimmer

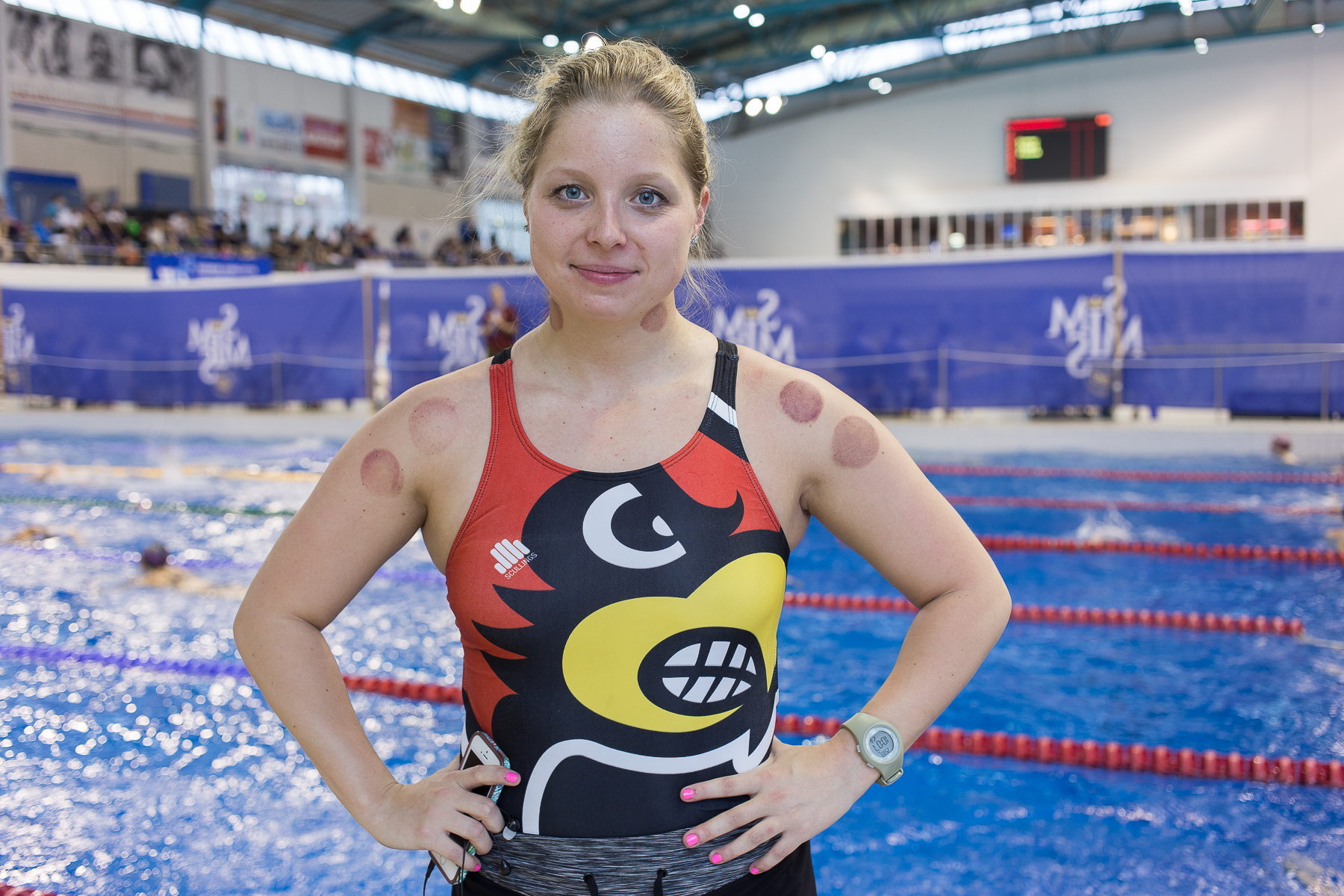
- Kylliäinen in 2016

Personal information
- Nationality: Finnish-American
- Born: 30 January 1993 (age 33) Baltimore, Maryland, United States
- Height: 155 cm (5 ft 1 in)
- Weight: 57 kg (126 lb)

Sport
- Sport: Swimming
- College team: Louisville
- Coach: Arthur Albiero (Louisville)

Tanja Kylliäinen (born 30 January 1993) is a Finnish swimmer who attended and swam for the University of Louisville. She competed in the women's 400 metre individual medley event at the 2016 Summer Olympics. Kylliäinen was born in Baltimore, Maryland to an American mother and a Finnish father. She has lived her whole life in the United States and speaks only a few words of Finnish.

Kylliäinen attended and swam for the University of Louisville under Head Coach Arthur Albiero.

== 2016 Rio de Janeiro Olympics ==
Kylliainen competed in the women's 400 metre individual medley event at the 2016 Summer Olympics where she placed 25th with a time of 4:45.33 finishing second in the first preliminary heat of 5 total preliminary heats. She also competed in the 200-meter individual medley finishing in 25th place with a time of 2:14.97, finishing first in the first preliminary heat of 5 total preliminary heats. Kylliainen's coach at the University of Louisville, Arthur Albieri, attended the 2016 Olympics as part of the USA National team staff, though he did not coach the Finish team.
