= Marcin Stolarski =

Polish swimmer

Personal information
- Full name: Marcin Tomasz Stolarski
- Nationality: Polish
- Born: 4 January 1996 (age 30) Warsaw, Poland
- Height: 1.87 m (6 ft 2 in)
- Weight: 79 kg (174 lb)

Sport
- Sport: Swimming

Marcin Tomasz Stolarski (born 4 January 1996) is a Polish swimmer. He competed in the men's 100 metre breaststroke event at the 2016 Summer Olympics.
