= Costa Rica at the 2017 Summer Universiade =

- IOC code: CRC
- NOC: Comité Olímpico de Costa Rica
- Website: www.concrc.org (in Spanish)

in Taipei, Taiwan 19 – 30 July 2017
- Competitors: 8 in 4 sports
- Medals Ranked 67th: Gold 0 Silver 0 Bronze 0 Total 0

Summer Universiade appearances
- 1959; 1961; 1963; 1965; 1967; 1970; 1973; 1975; 1977; 1979; 1981; 1983; 1985; 1987; 1989; 1991; 1993; 1995; 1997; 1999; 2001; 2003; 2005; 2007; 2009; 2011; 2013; 2015; 2017; 2019; 2021

Costa Rica participated at the 2017 Summer Universiade, in Taipei, Taiwan with 8 competitors in 4 sports.

== Competitors ==
The following table lists Colombia's delegation per sport and gender.

Sport	Men	Women	Total
Athletics	2	1	3
Fencing	1	1	2
Swimming	2	0	2
Taekwondo	1	0	1
Total	6	2	8

== Athletics ==
Athlete	Event	Round 1		Round 2		Semifinal		Final	
Athlete	Event	Result	Rank	Result	Rank	Result	Rank	Result	Rank
Gerald David Drummond Hernandez	Men's 400m Hurdles	52.22	5	—		did not advance			
Josue Francisco Murcia Cruz	Men's 800m	1:56.06	6	—		did not advance			
Daniela Rojas Gutierrez	Women's 400m Hurdles	58.40	2q	—				58.78	8

== Fencing ==
Athlete	Event	Round of 128	Round of 64	Round of 32	Round of 16	Quarterfinal	Semifinal	Final / BM	
Athlete	Event	Opposition Score	Opposition Score	Opposition Score	Opposition Score	Opposition Score	Opposition Score	Opposition Score	Rank
Bradley Johnston Leyer	Men's Epee Individual	Daniel Marcol (POL); W 15-11	Richard Schmidt (GER); L 9-15	did not advance					59

== Swimming ==
Athlete	Event	Heat		Semifinal		Final	
Athlete	Event	Time	Rank	Time	Rank	Time	Rank
Cristofer Daniel Lanuza Segura	Men's 1500m Freestyle	17:20.60	2	—		did not advance	
Cristofer Daniel Lanuza Segura	Men's 800m Freestyle	9:12.73	4	—		did not advance	
Cristofer Daniel Lanuza Segura	Men's Marathon	—				2:16:33.9	18
Alejandro Jose Lopez Vidal	Men's 100m Breaststroke	1:09.71	6	did not advance			
Alejandro Jose Lopez Vidal	Men's 50m Breaststroke	30.54	4	did not advance			

== Taekwondo ==
Athlete	Event	Round of 64	Round of 32	Round of 16	Quarterfinals	Semifinals	Final / BM	
Athlete	Event	Opposition Result	Opposition Result	Opposition Result	Opposition Result	Opposition Result	Opposition Result	Rank
Adrian Gabriel Chacon Araya	Men's -63 kg	Chi Hou Ng (MAC); W 31-17	Nuno Pinto E Costa (POL); L 9-26	Did Not Advance				
