= Chile at the 2017 Summer Universiade =

- IOC code: CHI
- NOC: Chilean Olympic Committee
- Website: www.coch.cl (in Spanish)

in Taipei, Taiwan 19 – 30 August 2017
- Competitors: 62 in 7 sports
- Medals Ranked 67th: Gold 0 Silver 0 Bronze 0 Total 0

Summer Universiade appearances
- 1959; 1961; 1963; 1965; 1967; 1970; 1973; 1975; 1977; 1979; 1981; 1983; 1985; 1987; 1989; 1991; 1993; 1995; 1997; 1999; 2001; 2003; 2005; 2007; 2009; 2011; 2013; 2015; 2017; 2019; 2021; 2025; 2027

Chile participated at the 2017 Summer Universiade, in Taipei, Taiwan with 62 competitors in 7 sports.

== Competitors ==
Sport	Men	Women	Total
Athletics	5	3	8
Basketball	0	12	12
Judo	4	3	7
Swimming	4	4	8
Table tennis	4	4	8
Taekwondo	3	4	7
Volleyball	0	12	12

== Athletics ==
=== Track Events ===
Athlete	Event	Round 1		Round 2		Semifinal		Final	
Athlete	Event	Result	Rank	Result	Rank	Result	Rank	Result	Rank
Cristofer Orlan Jarpa Gallegos	Men's 800m	1:56.73	4	—N/a		did not advance			
Cristofer Orlan Jarpa Gallegos	Men's 1500	3:53.24	11	—N/a				did not advance	
Ruben Gerardo Palma Fontealva	Men's 1500	3:54.97	10	—N/a				did not advance	
Alfredo Emilio Sepulveda Sandoval	Men's 400m Hurdles	51.08	5q	—N/a		52.26	8	did not advance	
Isidora Andrea Jiminez Ibacache	Women's 200m	24.08	4q	—N/a		24.31	6	did not advance	

=== Field Events ===
Athlete	Event	Qualification		Final	
Athlete	Event	Distance	Position	Distance	Position
Matias Rodrigo Lopez Gonzalez	Men's Shot Put	16.64	11	did not advance	
Camilo Esteban Olivares Rojas	Men's Long Jump	6.96	16	did not advance	
Natalia Duco Soler	Women's Shot Put	17.86	1Q	17.73	4
Ivana Xennia Gallardo Cruchet	Women's Discus	46.27	9	did not advance	

== Basketball ==
=== Women's Tournament ===
Group Stage

Team	Pld	W	L	PF	PA	PD	Pts
Chinese Taipei	3	3	0	252	166	+86	6
Sweden	3	2	1	225	161	+64	5
Hungary	3	1	2	184	202	−18	4
Chile	3	0	3	124	256	−132	3

21 August 2017
20:00 (UTC+8)

Report

Chinese Taipei	111–44	Chile
Scoring by quarter: 26–15, 31–8, 25–13, 29–8

Taipei Heping Basketball Gymnasium
Referees: S. Chebyshev (UKR), A. Csender (ROU), J. Horiuchi (JAP)

22 August 2017
17:30 (UTC+8)

Report

Chile	41–63	Hungary
Scoring by quarter: 8–18, 15–16, 4–15, 14–14

Taipei Heping Basketball Gymnasium
Referees: S. Emlek (TUR), H.S. Carrizales (MEX), B.M. Kyambadde (UGA)

23 August 2017
17:30 (UTC+8)

Report

Sweden	82–39	Chile
Scoring by quarter: 29–10, 14–11, 22–6, 17–12

Taipei Heping Basketball Gymnasium
Referees: J. Smiljanic (SRB), Y.S. An (KOR), H.M. Chang (HKG)

9th-16th place game

25 August 2017
10:00 (UTC+8)

Report

Portugal	62–31	Chile
Scoring by quarter: 14–2, 16–13, 19–7, 13–9

Taipei Heping Basketball Gymnasium
Referees: V. Maciulaitis (LTU), S. Emlek (TUR), S. Lee (KOR)

13th-16th place game

26 August 2017
12:30 (UTC+8)

Report

Chile	58–50	Uganda
Scoring by quarter: 22–17, 12–11, 8–10, 16–12

Taipei Arena
Referees: C.H. Chen (TPE), S. Arisawa (JAP), S.A. Chiau (MOZ)

13th place game

28 August 2017
10:00 (UTC+8)

Report

Poland	66–52	Chile
Scoring by quarter: 22–9, 15–18, 13–14, 16–11

University of Taipei (Tianmu) Gymnasium
Referees: G. Kapitany (HUN), J. Horiuchi (JAP), Y.S. An (KOR)

=== Judo ===
Athlete	Event	Round of 64	Round of 32	Round of 16	Quarterfinals	Repechage 32	Repechage 16	Repechage 8	Final Repechage	Semifinals	Final / BM	
Athlete	Event	Opposition Result	Opposition Result	Opposition Result	Opposition Result	Opposition Result	Opposition Result	Opposition Result	Opposition Result	Opposition Result	Opposition Result	Rank
Joaquin A. Barros Navarro	Men's -66 kg	Bye	Andrej Klokov (LTU); L 00-11	did not advance		—N/a	did not advance					N/A
Judith Carla Gonzalez Jaque	Women's -52 kg	—N/a	Roxana Gabriela Ioanca (ROU) 'W 01S2-00S1	Jelizaveta Gerasimenko (CZE) 'W 01S1-00S1	Eleudis De Souza Valentim (BRA) 'L 00-10	—N/a	Bye	Gantsetseg Ganbold (MGL) 'L 01S1-11	did not advance			N/A
Felipe Nicolas Luza Bugueno	Men's -90 kg	Davis Duda (LAT); L 00-10	did not advance									N/A
Megumi Patricia Naito Vidal	Women's -57 kg	—N/a	Yamina Halata (ALG); L 00-11S1	did not advance		—N/a	did not advance					N/A
Karina Andrea Orellana Rojas	Women's -63 kg	—N/a	Alexandra Bryon Barton (FIN); L 00-14	did not advance		—N/a	did not advance					N/A
Fernando A. Salazar Moreno	Men's -81 kg	Bye	Toraj Chenari (IRI); L 00S2-03	did not advance								N/A
Ricardo S. Segovia Collao	Men's -73 kg	Bye	Alejandro Feder Carla (ARG); L 00S1-01	did not advance								N/A
Barros Navarro; Segovia Collao; Salazar Moreno; Luza Bugueno	Men's Team	—N/a	Chinese Taipei (TPE); L 1-4	did not advance		—N/a			did not advance			N/A

== Swimming ==
=== Men ===
Athlete	Event	Heat		Semifinal		Final	
Athlete	Event	Time	Rank	Time	Rank	Time	Rank
Jose Tomas Galvez Engels	100m Breaststroke	1:06.85	4	did not advance			
Jose Tomas Galvez Engels	200m Breaststroke	2:24.33	3	did not advance			
Jose Tomas Galvez Engels	50m Breaststroke	30.70	5	did not advance			
Matias Antonio Pinto Matta	400m Freestyle	4:14.04	8	did not advance			
Matias Antonio Pinto Matta	200m Freestyle	1:55.41	3	did not advance			
Matias Antonio Pinto Matta	200m Breaststroke	DNS	—N/a	did not advance			
Matias Antonio Pinto Matta	100m Freestyle	53.58	7	did not advance			
Felipe Martin Quiroz Uteau	100m Breaststroke	1:07.67	5	did not advance			
Felipe Martin Quiroz Uteau	200m Individual Medley	2:10.18	6	did not advance			
Felipe Martin Quiroz Uteau	200m Breaststroke	2:27.37	5	did not advance			
Felipe Martin Quiroz Uteau	400m Individual Medley	4:39.50	3	did not advance			
Carlos Andres Varas Soler	200m Freestyle	1:58.35	3	did not advance			
Carlos Andres Varas Soler	100m Freestyle	53.08	4	did not advance			
Carlos Andres Varas Soler	50m Freestyle	24.75	5	did not advance			
Galvez Engels; Pinto Matta; Quiroz Uteau; Varas Soler	4x100m Freestyle Relay	3:40.24	6	—N/a		did not advance	
Galvez Engels; Pinto Matta; Quiroz Uteau; Varas Soler	4x100m Medley Relay	4:05.47	3	—N/a		did not advance	

=== Women ===
Athlete	Event	Heat		Semifinal		Final	
Athlete	Event	Time	Rank	Time	Rank	Time	Rank
Alejandra Leono Chamorro Martinez	50m Butterfly	31.19	8	did not advance			
Alejandra Leono Chamorro Martinez	200m Individual Medley	2:34.74	4	did not advance			
Alejandra Leono Chamorro Martinez	100m Butterfly	1:08.23	3	did not advance			
Alejandra Leono Chamorro Martinez	200m Butterfly	2:30.36	3	did not advance			
Leila Andrea Chanuar	100m Breaststroke	1:16.35	7	did not advance			
Leila Andrea Chanuar	50m Breaststroke	34.26	2	did not advance			
Daniela Cristin Reyes Hinrichsen	50m Butterfly	29.79	2	did not advance			
Daniela Cristin Reyes Hinrichsen	200m Individual Medley	2:31.58	2	did not advance			
Daniela Cristin Reyes Hinrichsen	100m Butterfly	1:05.33	1	did not advance			
Daniela Cristin Reyes Hinrichsen	200m Butterfly	2:25.90	2	did not advance			
Marianne Andrea Spuhr Ramirez	200m Backstroke	2:28.18	8	did not advance			
Marianne Andrea Spuhr Ramirez	100m Backstroke	1:07.77	1	did not advance			
Marianne Andrea Spuhr Ramirez	50m Backstroke	32.45	6	did not advance			
Marianne Andrea Spuhr Ramirez	50m Freestyle	29.76	5	did not advance			
Chamorro Martinez; Chanuar; Reyes Hinrichsen; Spuhr Ramirez	4x100m Freestyle Relay	4:11.75	3	—N/a		did not advance	
Chamorro Martinez; Chanuar; Reyes Hinrichsen; Spuhr Ramirez	4x100m Medley Relay	4:36.84	2	—N/a		did not advance	

== Table Tennis ==
Athlete	Event	Group Stage			Round of 128	Round of 64	Round of 32	Round of 16	Quarterfinals	Semifinals	Final / BM	
Athlete	Event	Opposition Result	Opposition Result	Opposition Result	Opposition Result	Opposition Result	Opposition Result	Opposition Result	Opposition Result	Opposition Result	Opposition Result	Rank
Victor Sebastian Coydan Morales	Men's Singles	Liang Qiu (GER); L 1-3	Ralph Hamdar (NED); W 3-1	—N/a		Did Not Advance						
Marcelo Alejandro Fernandez Silva	Men's Singles	Colin Stuart Dalgleish (GBR); L 0-3	Martin Storf (AUT); L 0-3	—N/a		Did Not Advance						
Manuel Alfonso Moya Maureira	Men's Singles	Javier Santiago Cillis (ARG); W 3-0	Vildan Gadiev (RUS); L 1-3	—N/a		Did Not Advance						
Sebastian Patri Roman Aravena	Men's Singles	Mario Cristobal Alvarez Sanchez (NCA); W 3-0	Bryan Ho (CAN); W 3-1	—N/a		Woojin Jang (KOR); L 0-4	Did Not Advance					
Coydan Morales/Moya Maureira	Men's Doubles	—N/a				Cassin/Seyfried (FRA); L 1-3	Did Not Advance					
Fernandez Silva/Roman Aravena	Men's Doubles	—N/a				Malobela/Maloka (BOT); W 3-0	Ham/Kang (PRK); L 0-3	Did Not Advance				
Coydan Morales; Fernandez Silva; Moya Maureira; Roman Aravena	Men's Team	France (FRA); L 0-3	Lebanon (LBN); W 3-0	DPR Korea (PRK); L 0-3	Did Not Advance							
Natalia Andrea Castellano Vera	Women's Singles	Jeramae Saromines (PHI); W 3-0	Angela Shan Guan (USA); L 0-3	—N/a		Minami Ando (JPN); L 0-4	Did Not Advance					
Blanca Fernanda Duran Abarca	Women's Singles	Stina Kristina Zetterstroem (SWE); W 3-2	Amanda Silva Marques (BRA); W 3-2	—N/a		Elizaveta Khlyzova (RUS); L 0-4	Did Not Advance					
Cristal De Los Meneses Montecinos	Women's Singles	Liisi Koit (EST); W 3-1	Sara Mikac (CRO); L 1-3	—N/a		Did Not Advance						
Judith Varimia Morales Escobar	Women's Singles	Yolanda Aspen King (GBR); W 3-2	Gayoung Kim (KOR); L 0-3	—N/a		Did Not Advance						
Castellano Vera/Meneses Montecinos	Women's Doubles	—N/a				Cheng/Liu (TPE); L 0-3	Did Not Advance					
Duran Abarca/Morales Escobar	Women's Doubles	—N/a				Mikulcova/Tomanova (CZE); L 0-3	Did Not Advance					
align=leftCastellano Vera; Duran Abarca; Meneses Montecinos; Morales Escobar	Women's Team	Germany (GER); L 0-3	Estonia (EST); W 3-0	Russia (RUS); L 1-3	Did Not Advance							
Coydan Morales/Duran Abarca	Mixed Doubles	—N/a			Bye	Cifuentes/Codina (ARG); L 0-3	Did Not Advance					
Moya Maureira/Morales Escobar	Mixed Doubles	—N/a			Bye	Pfeffer/Mischek (AUT); L 0-3	Did Not Advance					

== Taekwondo ==
Athlete	Event	Round of 64	Round of 32	Round of 16	Quarterfinals	Semifinals	Final / BM	
Athlete	Event	Opposition Result	Opposition Result	Opposition Result	Opposition Result	Opposition Result	Opposition Result	Rank
Fernanda Nicole Aguirre	Women's -57 kg	—N/a	Genesis Carolina Andujar (DOM); W 15-13	Rafaela Vieira De Araujo (DOM); L 16-18	Did Not Advance			
Siri Susan Barnett Rose	Women's -73 kg	—N/a	Cansel Deniz (DOM); L 8-23	Did Not Advance				
Crisla Carolina Eriza Carrasco	Women's -49 kg	—N/a	Yu-Ting Hung (TPE); L 4-18	Did Not Advance				
Bastian Felipe Munoz Garrido	Men's -74 kg	Bye	Said Guliyev (AZE); L 11-29	Did Not Advance				
Sebastian Roberto Navea	Men's -63 kg	Bye	Muhammad Anas (PAK); W 14-2	Bernado Pié (DOM); W 14-13	Mirhashem Hosseini (IRI); L 9-16	Did Not Advance		
Francisca Catal Rios Rojas	Women's -53 kg	—N/a	Latika Bhandari (IND); W 11-7	Andrea Jerom (CAN); L 2-7	Did Not Advance			
Joaquin Sanchez Cabrera	Men's -58 kg	Francisco Adria Rodriguez Ochoa (ESA); W 19-9	Stepan Dimitrov (MDA); L 15-28	Did Not Advance				
Munoz Garrido; Navea; Sanchez Cabrera	Men's Team Kyorugi	—N/a		India (IND); W 62-12	Russia (RUS); L 25-82	Did Not Advance		
Aguirre; Barnett Rose; Rios Rojas; Eriza Carrasco	Women's Team Kyorugi	—N/a		United States of America (USA); L 16-23	Did Not Advance			

== Volleyball ==
=== Men's Tournament ===
Group Stage

Pos	Team	Pld	W	L	Pts	SW	SL	SR	SPW	SPL	SPR	Qualification
1	Russia	5	5	0	15	15	1	15.000	411	335	1.227	Quarterfinals
2	Czech Republic	5	4	1	11	12	6	2.000	415	366	1.134	Quarterfinals
3	Romania	5	3	2	9	11	7	1.571	427	403	1.060	9th–16th place
4	Hong Kong	5	2	3	5	8	13	0.615	411	464	0.886	9th–16th place
5	Australia	5	1	4	4	6	13	0.462	420	429	0.979	17th–22nd place
6	Chile	5	0	5	1	3	15	0.200	335	422	0.794	17th–22nd place

Date	Time		Score		Set 1	Set 2	Set 3	Set 4	Set 5	Total	Report
20 Aug	13:00	Romania	3–0	Chile	25–23	25–18	25–9			75–50	P2 P3
21 Aug	18:00	Chile	2–3	Hong Kong	16–25	23–25	25–18	25–21	12–15	101–104	P2 P3
22 Aug	15:00	Czech Republic	3–0	Chile	25–10	25–16	25–18			75–44	P2 P3
24 Aug	15:00	Chile	1–3	Australia	8–25	25–14	21–25	19–25		73–89	P2 P3
25 Aug	15:00	Russia	3–0	Chile	25–21	29–27	25–19			79–67	P2 P3

17th-22nd place quarterfinal

Date	Time		Score		Set 1	Set 2	Set 3	Set 4	Set 5	Total	Report
27 Aug	18:00	Cyprus	3–1	Chile	25–19	28–26	19–25	25–18		97–88	P2 P3

21st place match

Date	Time		Score		Set 1	Set 2	Set 3	Set 4	Set 5	Total	Report
28 Aug	17:30	United Arab Emirates	1–3	Chile	23–25	27–25	14–25	20–25		84–100	P2 P3
