= Ireland at the 2017 Summer Universiade =

- IOC code: IRL
- NOC: National Olympic Committee of Ireland

in Taipei, Taiwan 19 – 30 August 2017
- Competitors: 63 in 4 sports
- Medals Ranked 41st: Gold 1 Silver 0 Bronze 0 Total 1

Summer Universiade appearances
- 1959; 1961; 1963; 1965; 1967; 1970; 1973; 1975; 1977; 1979; 1981; 1983; 1985; 1987; 1989; 1991; 1993; 1995; 1997; 1999; 2001; 2003; 2005; 2007; 2009; 2011; 2013; 2015; 2017; 2019; 2021; 2025; 2027

Ireland participated at the 2017 Summer Universiade, in Taipei, Taiwan.

== Competitors ==
Sport	Men	Women	Total
Athletics	5	6	11
Diving	1	1	2
Football	20	20	40
Swimming	10	0	10
Total	36	27	63

== Medals by sport ==
Sport	Men				Women				Grand Total			
Sport	1st place, gold medalist(s)	2nd place, silver medalist(s)	3rd place, bronze medalist(s)	Total	1st place, gold medalist(s)	2nd place, silver medalist(s)	3rd place, bronze medalist(s)	Total	1st place, gold medalist(s)	2nd place, silver medalist(s)	3rd place, bronze medalist(s)	Total
Swimming	1	0	0	1	0	0	0	0	1	0	0	1

== Medalists ==
Medal	Name	Sport	Event	Date
Gold	Shane Ryan	Swimming	Men's 50 metre backstroke	23 August
