= Mikhail Dorinov =

Russian swimmer

Personal information
- Nationality: Russian
- Born: 9 August 1995 (age 30)

Sport
- Sport: Swimming
Medal record
Men's swimming
Representing Russia
World Championships (SC)
Bronze medal – third place	2016 Windsor	200 m breaststroke
European Championships (SC)
Bronze medal – third place	2017 Copenhagen	200 m breaststroke
Bronze medal – third place	2021 Kazan	200 m breaststroke
Summer Universiade
Silver medal – second place	2017 Taipei	4×100 m medley

Mikhail Vyacheslavovich Dorinov (Russian: Михаил Вячеславович Доринов; born 9 August 1995) is a Russian swimmer. He competed in the men's 200 metre breaststroke event at the 2018 FINA World Swimming Championships (25 m), in Hangzhou, China.
