= Kim Jae-youn =

South Korean swimmer (born 1996)

Personal information
- Born: 26 August 1996 (age 29)

Sport
- Sport: Swimming
Medal record
Representing South Korea
Asian Games
Bronze medal – third place	2018 Jakarta	4×100 m mixed medley

Kim Jae-youn (born 26 August 1996) is a South Korean swimmer. He competed in the men's 100 metre breaststroke event at the 2017 World Aquatics Championships.
