= Hungary at the 2017 Summer Universiade =

- IOC code: HUN
- NOC: Hungarian Olympic Committee
- Website: olimpia.hu/home

in Taipei, Taiwan 19 – 30 July 2017
- Competitors: 140 in 14 sports
- Medals Ranked 14th: Gold 5 Silver 5 Bronze 4 Total 14

Summer Universiade appearances
- 1959; 1961; 1963; 1965; 1967; 1970; 1973; 1975; 1977; 1979; 1981; 1983; 1985; 1987; 1989; 1991; 1993; 1995; 1997; 1999; 2001; 2003; 2005; 2007; 2009; 2011; 2013; 2015; 2017; 2019; 2021; 2025; 2027

Hungary participated at the 2017 Summer Universiade, in Taipei, Taiwan.

== Medal summary ==
=== Medal by sports ===
Medals by sport
Sport	1st place, gold medalist(s)	2nd place, silver medalist(s)	3rd place, bronze medalist(s)	Total
Athletics	1	1	2	4
Fencing	3	3	0	6
Swimming	1	0	2	3
Water polo	0	1	0	1
Total	5	5	4	14
