= United States at the 2017 Summer Universiade =

- IOC code: USA
- NOC: United States Olympic Committee
- Website: www.teamusa.org

in Taipei, Taiwan 19 – August 30, 2017
- Competitors: 348 in 20 sports
- Flag bearer: Briadam Herrera
- Medals Ranked 5th: Gold 16 Silver 19 Bronze 16 Total 51

Summer Universiade appearances (overview)
- 1965; 1967; 1970; 1973; 1975; 1977; 1979; 1981; 1983; 1985; 1987; 1989; 1991; 1993; 1995; 1997; 1999; 2001; 2003; 2005; 2007; 2009; 2011; 2013; 2015; 2017; 2019; 2021; 2025; 2027

United States participated at the 2017 Summer Universiade, in Taipei, Taiwan.

== Medal summary ==
=== Medal by sports ===
Medals by sport
Sport	1st place, gold medalist(s)	2nd place, silver medalist(s)	3rd place, bronze medalist(s)	Total
Athletics	1	3	1	5
Badminton	0	0	1	1
Baseball	0	1	0	1
Basketball	0	1	0	1
Diving	0	3	1	4
Fencing	0	1	0	1
Golf	2	0	0	2
Swimming	11	9	8	28
Taekwondo	1	1	2	4
Tennis	0	0	1	1
Water polo	1	0	0	1
Wushu	0	0	2	2
Total	16	19	16	51
