= United States at the 2023 Pan American Games =

- IOC code: USA
- NOC: United States Olympic & Paralympic Committee

in Santiago, Chile October 20, 2023 – November 5, 2023
- Competitors: 631 in 42 sports
- Flag bearers (opening): Vincent Hancock & Jordan Chiles
- Flag bearers (closing): Ryan Santos & Lily Zhang
- Medals Ranked 1st: Gold 124 Silver 75 Bronze 87 Total 286

Pan American Games appearances (overview)
- 1951; 1955; 1959; 1963; 1967; 1971; 1975; 1979; 1983; 1987; 1991; 1995; 1999; 2003; 2007; 2011; 2015; 2019; 2023

The United States competed at the 2023 Pan American Games in Santiago, Chile from October 20 to November 5, 2023. This was the United States's 19th appearance at the Pan American Games, having competed at every Games since the inaugural edition in 1951. The team included 631 athletes (313 men and 318 women).

Sport shooter Vincent Hancock and artistic gymnast Jordan Chiles were the country's flagbearers during the opening ceremony. Meanwhile, rugby sevens player Ryan Santos and table tennis player Lily Zhang were the country's flagbearers during the closing ceremony.

== Medalists ==
The following U.S. competitors won medals at the games. In the discipline sections below, the medalists' names are bolded.

Medal	Name	Sport	Event	Date
Gold	Cameron Bock; Stephen Nedoroscik; Curran Phillips; Colt Walker; Donnell Whittenburg	Gymnastics	Men's artistic team all-around	October 21
Gold	Sagen Maddalena	Shooting	Women's 10 m air rifle	October 21
Gold	Piper Kelly	Sport climbing	Women's speed	October 21
Gold	Jacob Foster	Swimming	Men's 100 m breaststroke	October 21
Gold	Mason Laur	Swimming	Men's 200 m butterfly	October 21
Gold	Paige Madden	Swimming	Women's 400 m freestyle	October 21
Gold	Dakota Luther	Swimming	Women's 200 m butterfly	October 21
Gold	Khalfani Harris	Taekwondo	Men's 68 kg	October 21
Gold	Kaitlyn Reclusado	Taekwondo	Women's individual poomsae	October 21
Gold	Kamren Larsen	Cycling	Men's BMX racing	October 22
Gold	Kristan Faulkner	Cycling	Women's road time trial	October 22
Gold	Jordan Chiles; Kayla DiCello; Kaliya Lincoln; Zoe Miller; Tiana Sumanasekera	Gymnastics	Women's artistic team all-around	October 22
Gold	Taylor Nye	Roller sports	Men's park skateboarding	October 22
Gold	Vincent Hancock	Shooting	Men's skeet	October 22
Gold	Sam Watson	Sport climbing	Men's speed	October 22
Gold	Coby Carrozza	Swimming	Men's 200 m freestyle	October 22
Gold	Jack Aikins	Swimming	Men's 200 m backstroke	October 22
Gold	Lukas Miller	Swimming	Men's 100 m butterfly	October 22
Gold	Kennedy Noble	Swimming	Women's 200 m backstroke	October 22
Gold	Carl Nickolas	Taekwondo	Men's 80 kg	October 22
Gold	United States men's national 3x3 team: Canyon Barry; Jimmer Fredette; Kareem Maddox; Dylan Travis	Basketball	Men's 3x3 tournament	October 23
Gold	United States women's national 3x3 team: Cierra Burdick; Blake Dietrick; Lexie Hull; Azurá Stevens	Basketball	Women's 3x3 tournament	October 23
Gold	Codi Harrison; Anna Marek; Christian Simonson; Sarah Tubman	Equestrian	Team dressage	October 23
Gold	Kayla DiCello	Gymnastics	Women's artistic individual all-around	October 23
Gold	Ezra Carlson; Alexander Hedge	Rowing	Men's pair	October 23
Gold	Isabela Darvin; Hannah Paynter	Rowing	Women's pair	October 23
Gold	Madeleine Focht; Katherine Horvat; Grace Joyce; Veronica Nicacio	Rowing	Women's quadruple sculls	October 23
Gold	Rylan Kissel; Mary Tucker	Shooting	Mixed pairs air rifle	October 23
Gold	Vincent Hancock; Diana Vizzi	Shooting	Mixed pairs skeet	October 23
Gold	Jesse Grupper	Sport climbing	Men's boulder & lead	October 23
Gold	Adam Chaney	Swimming	Men's 100 m backstroke	October 23
Gold	Jacob Foster	Swimming	Men's 200 m breaststroke	October 23
Gold	Paige Madden	Swimming	Women's 800 m freestyle	October 23
Gold	Josephine Fuller	Swimming	Women's 100 m backstroke	October 23
Gold	Jack Aikins^{[a]} Olivia Bray^{[a]} Arsenio Bustos^{[a]} Jacob Foster; Jonny Kulow; Kennedy Noble; Kelly Pash; Kayla Wilson^{[a]}	Swimming	Mixed 4 × 100 m medley relay	October 23
Gold	Madelynn Gorman-Shore	Taekwondo	Women's +67 kg	October 23
Gold	Nate Smith	Water skiing	Men's slalom	October 23
Gold	Regina Jaquess	Water skiing	Women's slalom	October 23
Gold	Regina Jaquess	Water skiing	Women's jump	October 23
Gold	Erika Lang	Water skiing	Women's tricks	October 23
Gold	Olivia Reeves	Weightlifting	Women's 81 kg	October 23
Gold	Donnell Whittenburg	Gymnastics	Men's rings	October 24
Gold	Zoe Miller	Gymnastics	Women's uneven bars	October 24
Gold	Adam Manilla; Erika Manilla	Racquetball	Mixed doubles	October 24
Gold	Natalia Grossman	Sport climbing	Women's boulder & lead	October 24
Gold	David Curtiss	Swimming	Men's 50 m freestyle	October 24
Gold	Jay Litherland	Swimming	Men's 400 m individual medley	October 24
Gold	Gabi Albiero	Swimming	Women's 50 m freestyle	October 24
Gold	Olivia Bray^{[a]} Amy Fulmer^{[a]} Paige Madden; Kelly Pash; Camille Spink; Rachel Stege^{[a]} Kayla Wilson	Swimming	Women's 4 × 200 m freestyle relay	October 24
Gold	Regina Jaquess	Water skiing	Women's overall	October 24
Gold	Mary Theisen-Lappen	Weightlifting	Women's +81 kg	October 24
Gold	Beiwen Zhang	Badminton	Women's singles	October 25
Gold	Curran Phillips	Gymnastics	Men's parallel bars	October 25
Gold	Kaliya Lincoln	Gymnastics	Women's floor	October 25
Gold	Madeleine Focht; Veronica Nicacio	Rowing	Women's double sculls	October 25
Gold	Ezra Carlson; Isabela Darvin; Alexander Hedge; James Plihal; Colette Lucas-Conwell; Lauren Miller; Hannah Paynter; Cristina Pretto; Mark Couwenhoven	Rowing	Mixed eight	October 25
Gold	Mary Tucker	Shooting	Women's 50 m rifle three positions	October 25
Gold	Jack Aikins; Coby Carrozza^{[a]} Jack Dahlgren^{[a]} Jacob Foster; Jonny Kulow; Lukas Miller; Noah Nichols^{[a]} Christopher O'Connor^{[a]}	Swimming	Men's 4 × 100 m medley relay	October 25
Gold	Rachel Stege	Swimming	Women's 1500 m freestyle	October 25
Gold	Jahmal Harvey	Boxing	Men's 57 kg	October 27
Gold	Joshua Edwards	Boxing	Men's +92 kg	October 27
Gold	Zachary Lokken	Canoeing	Men's slalom C-1	October 29
Gold	Joshua Joseph	Canoeing	Men's slalom K-1	October 29
Gold	Evy Leibfarth	Canoeing	Women's slalom K-1	October 29
Gold	Lauren Stephens	Cycling	Women's road race	October 29
Gold	Caroline Pamukcu	Equestrian	Individual eventing	October 29
Gold	Brennan Gravley	Swimming	Men's 10 km marathon	October 29
Gold	Ashley Twichell	Swimming	Women's 10 km marathon	October 29
Gold	Lee Kiefer	Fencing	Women's foil	October 30
Gold	Zane Schweitzer	Surfing	Men's stand-up paddleboard surfing	October 30
Gold	Connor Baxter	Surfing	Men's stand-up paddleboard race	October 30
Gold	Candice Appleby	Surfing	Women's stand-up paddleboard race	October 30
Gold	Kasey Knevelbaard	Athletics	Men's 5000 m	October 31
Gold	Nick Itkin	Fencing	Men's foil	October 31
Gold	Magda Skarbonkiewicz	Fencing	Women's sabre	October 31
Gold	Rachel Sung; Amy Wang	Table tennis	Women's doubles	October 31
Gold	DeAnna Price	Athletics	Women's hammer throw	November 1
Gold	Karl Cook; Kent Farrington; Laura Kraut; McLain Ward	Equestrian	Team jumping	November 1
Gold	Andrew Doddo	Fencing	Men's sabre	November 1
Gold	Olivia Fiechter	Squash	Women's singles	November 1
Gold	Zane Richards	Wrestling	Men's freestyle 57 kg	November 1
Gold	Tyler Berger	Wrestling	Men's freestyle 74 kg	November 1
Gold	Kyle Snyder	Wrestling	Men's freestyle 97 kg	November 1
Gold	Mason Parris	Wrestling	Men's freestyle 125 kg	November 1
Gold	Bridget Williams	Athletics	Women's pole vault	November 2
Gold	Erin Marsh	Athletics	Women's heptathlon	November 2
Gold	Breanna Clemmer; Shannon O'Keefe	Bowling	Women's doubles	November 2
Gold	Samuel Imrek; Samuel Larsen; Curtis McDowald	Fencing	Men's team épée	November 2
Gold	Jackie Dubrovich; Lee Kiefer; Zander Rhodes	Fencing	Women's team foil	November 2
Gold	Forrest Molinari	Wrestling	Women's 68 kg	November 2
Gold	Isai Rodriguez	Athletics	Men's 10,000 m	November 3
Gold	Miles Chamley-Watson; Nick Itkin; Gerek Meinhardt	Fencing	Men's team foil	November 3
Gold	Alexis Anglade; Maia Chamberlain; Magda Skarbonkiewicz	Fencing	Women's team sabre	November 3
Gold	Ariel Torres	Karate	Men's individual kata	November 3
Gold	Sakura Kokumai	Karate	Women's individual kata	November 3
Gold	Ian Barrows; Hans Henken	Sailing	49er	November 3
Gold	Daniela Moroz	Sailing	Women's kite	November 3
Gold	Timothy Brownell; Olivia Clyne	Squash	Mixed doubles	November 3
Gold	Ildar Hafizov	Wrestling	Men's Greco-Roman 60 kg	November 3
Gold	Kamal Bey	Wrestling	Men's Greco-Roman 77 kg	November 3
Gold	Trenton Cowles; Brady Ellison; Jackson Mirich; Jack Williams	Archery	Men's team recurve	November 4
Gold	Catalina GNoriega; Casey Kaufhold; Jennifer Mucino-Fernandez	Archery	Women's team recurve	November 4
Gold	Olivia Dean; Alexis Ruiz	Archery	Women's team compound	November 4
Gold	Matt Ludwig	Athletics	Men's pole vault	November 4
Gold	Curtis Thompson	Athletics	Men's javelin throw	November 4
Gold	Rachel McCoy	Athletics	Women's high jump	November 4
Gold	Grace Choi	Breaking	B-Girls	November 4
Gold	Jessica Stevens	Gymnastics	Women's individual trampoline	November 4
Gold	Ruben Padilla; Aliaksei Shostak	Gymnastics	Men's synchronized trampoline	November 4
Gold	Nicole Ahsinger; Jessica Stevens	Gymnastics	Women's synchronized trampoline	November 4
Gold	United States women's national rugby sevens team: Lauren Doyle; Cheta Emba; Joanne Fa'avesi; Nicole Heavirland; Kristi Kirshe; Ilona Maher; Alena Olsen; Ariana Ramsey; Stephanie Rovetti; Alexandria Sedrick; Samantha Sullivan; Naya Tapper	Rugby sevens	Women's tournament	November 4
Gold	Erika Reineke	Sailing	ILCA 6	November 4
Gold	Madeline Baldridge; Sarah Chin; Allan Terhune, Jr.	Sailing	Lightning	November 4
Gold	United States women's national softball team: Ali Aguilar; Aliyah Andrews; Sis Bates; Allyson Carda; Erin Coffel; Mia Davidson; Montana Fouts; Rachel Garcia; Sahvanna Jaquish; Janae Jefferson; Baylee Klingler; Aubrey Leach; Amanda Lorenz; Haylie McCleney; Dejah Mulipola; Kathryn Sandercock	Softball	Women's tournament	November 4
Gold	United States men's national water polo team: Alexander Bowen; Luca Cupido; Hannes Daube; Chase Dodd; Ryder Dodd; Benjamin Hallock; Drew Holland; Johnathan Hooper; Maxwell Ivring; Alexander Obert; Adrian Weinberg; Dylan Woodhead; Quinn Woodhead	Water polo	Men's tournament	November 4
Gold	United States women's national water polo team: Emily Ansmus; Rachel Fattal; Jenna Flynn; Kaleigh Gilchrist; Ashleigh Johnson; Ava Johnson; Amanda Longan; Ryann Neushul; Tara Prentice; Jordan Raney; Jewel Roemer; Maggie Steffens; Bayley Weber	Water polo	Women's tournament	November 4
Gold	Jackson Mirich	Archery	Men's individual recurve	November 5
Gold	Brady Ellison; Casey Kaufhold	Archery	Mixed team recurve	November 5
Gold	A.J. Johnson	Bowling	Men's singles	November 5
Gold	Hannah Roberts	Cycling	Women's BMX freestyle	November 5
Gold	Thomas Scott	Karate	Men's 75 kg	November 5
Gold	Erin Jackson	Roller sports	Women's 500 m + distance	November 5
Gold	Olivia Clyne; Olivie Fiechter; Amanda Sobhy	Squash	Women's team	November 5
Gold	Rachel Sung; Amy Wang; Lily Zhang	Table tennis	Women's team	November 5
Silver	Rylan Kissel	Shooting	Men's 10 m air rifle	October 21
Silver	Emma Hunt	Sport climbing	Women's speed	October 21
Silver	Noah Nichols	Swimming	Men's 100 m breaststroke	October 21
Silver	Jack Aikins; Coby Carrozza^{[a]} Adam Chaney; Brooks Curry; Jonny Kulow; Lukas Miller^{[a]}	Swimming	Men's 4 × 100 m freestyle relay	October 21
Silver	Gabi Albiero; Olivia Bray^{[a]} Catie DeLoof; Amy Fulmer; Camille Spink^{[a]} Reilly Tiltmann^{[a]} Kayla Wilson	Swimming	Women's 4 × 100 m freestyle relay	October 21
Silver	Cameron Wood	Cycling	Men's BMX racing	October 22
Silver	Noah Bratschi	Sport climbing	Men's speed	October 22
Silver	Ian Grum	Swimming	Men's 200 m backstroke	October 22
Silver	Reilly Tiltmann	Swimming	Women's 200 m backstroke	October 22
Silver	Kelly Pash	Swimming	Women's 100 m butterfly	October 22
Silver	Gabi Albiero^{[a]} Brooks Curry; Jack Dahlgren^{[a]} Catie DeLoof; Amy Fulmer; Jonny Kulow; Paige Madden^{[a]}	Swimming	Mixed 4 × 100 m freestyle relay	October 22
Silver	Sean Bailey	Sport climbing	Men's boulder & lead	October 23
Silver	Brooks Curry	Swimming	Men's 100 m freestyle	October 23
Silver	Jonny Kulow	Swimming	Men's 100 m freestyle	October 23
Silver	Rachel Stege	Swimming	Women's 800 m freestyle	October 23
Silver	Kennedy Noble	Swimming	Women's 100 m backstroke	October 23
Silver	Jonathan Healy	Taekwondo	Men's +80 kg	October 23
Silver	Mary Morgan Howell	Water skiing	Women's wakeboard	October 23
Silver	Keely Ainslie; Kayla Hankins; Mandy Marquardt	Cycling	Women's team sprint	October 24
Silver	Jordan Chiles	Gymnastics	Women's vault	October 24
Silver	Elizabeth Martin; Mary Wilson	Rowing	Women's lightweight double sculls	October 24
Silver	Isabela Darvin; Lauren Miller; Hannah Paynter; Cristina Pretto	Rowing	Women's four	October 24
Silver	Isabela Darvin; Madeleine Focht; Katherine Horvat; Grace Joyce; Collete Lucas-Conwell; Lauren Miller; Veronica Nicacio; Hannah Paynter; Cristina Pretto	Rowing	Women's eight	October 24
Silver	Brooke Raboutou	Sport climbing	Women's boulder & lead	October 24
Silver	Jonny Kulow	Swimming	Men's 50 m freestyle	October 24
Silver	Coby Carrozza; Brooks Curry; Jack Dahlgren; Zane Grothe; Mason Laur^{[a]} Lukas Miller^{[a]} Christopher O'Connor^{[a]} James Plage^{[a]}	Swimming	Men's 4 × 200 m freestyle relay	October 24
Silver	Lucerne Bell	Swimming	Women's 400 m individual medley	October 24
Silver	Keiser Witte	Weightlifting	Men's +102 kg	October 24
Silver	Jennie Gai	Badminton	Women's singles	October 25
Silver	Annie Xu; Kerry Xu	Badminton	Women's doubles	October 25
Silver	Vinson Chiu; Jennie Gai	Badminton	Mixed doubles	October 25
Silver	Colt Walker	Gymnastics	Men's parallel bars	October 25
Silver	Kayla DiCello	Gymnastics	Women's floor	October 25
Silver	Jacob Plihal	Rowing	Men's single sculls	October 25
Silver	Sagen Maddalena	Shooting	Women's 50 m rifle three positions	October 25
Silver	Will Gallant	Swimming	Men's 1500 m freestyle	October 25
Silver	Arsenio Bustos	Swimming	Men's 200 m individual medley	October 25
Silver	Gabi Albiero^{[a]} Olivia Bray^{[a]} Catie DeLoof; Josephine Fuller; Anna Keating^{[a]} Kelly Pash; Reilly Tiltmann^{[a]} Emma Weber	Swimming	Women's 4 × 100 medley relay	October 25
Silver	James Hall	Shooting	Men's 10 m air pistol	October 26
Silver	Alexis Lagan	Shooting	Women's 10 m air pistol	October 26
Silver	Jennifer Lozano	Boxing	Women's 50 kg	October 27
Silver	Morelle McCane	Boxing	Women's 66 kg	October 27
Silver	Brendan Anderson; Tristen Bell	Modern pentathlon	Men's relay	October 27
Silver	Timothy Sherry	Shooting	Men's 50 m rifle three positions	October 27
Silver	Sydney Elliott; Liz Halliday; Caroline Pamukcu; Sharon White	Equestrian	Team eventing	October 29
Silver	Miles Chamley-Watson	Fencing	Men's foil	October 31
Silver	Maia Chamberlain	Fencing	Women's sabre	October 31
Silver	De'Vion Wilson	Athletics	Men's 110 m hurdles	November 1
Silver	Amanda Sobhy	Squash	Women's singles	November 1
Silver	Megumi Field; Ruby Remati	Artistic swimming	Women's duet	November 2
Silver	Taylor Werner	Athletics	Women's 5000 m	November 2
Silver	Evita Griskenas	Gymnastics	Women's rhythmic individual all-around	November 2
Silver	Matthew McElroy	Triathlon	Men's individual	November 2
Silver	Nahshon Garrett	Wrestling	Men's freestyle 65 kg	November 2
Silver	Mark Hall	Wrestling	Men's freestyle 86 kg	November 2
Silver	Anita Alvarez; Jamie Czarkowski; Megumi Field; Audrey Kwon; Calista Liu; Jacklyn Luu; Bill May; Dami Ramirez; Ruby Remati	Artistic swimming	Team	November 3
Silver	Sam Chelanga	Athletics	Men's 10,000 m	November 3
Silver	Kent Farrington	Equestrian	Individual jumping	November 3
Silver	Dominique Stater	Sailing	Women's IQFoil	November 3
Silver	Olivia Fiechter; Amanda Sobhy	Squash	Women's doubles	November 3
Silver	Sawyer Sullivan	Archery	Men's individual compound	November 4
Silver	Kris Schaff; Sawyer Sullivan	Archery	Men's team compound	November 4
Silver	Alexis Ruiz	Archery	Women's individual compound	November 4
Silver	Alexis Ruiz; Kris Schaff	Archery	Mixed team compound	November 4
Silver	Daniel Michalski	Athletics	Men's 3000 m steeplechase	November 4
Silver	Daniel Haugh	Athletics	Men's hammer throw	November 4
Silver	Jeffery Louis	Breaking	B-Boys	November 4
Silver	Jonas Ecker	Canoeing	Men's K-1 1000 m	November 4
Silver	Josef Cohen; Andrew Doddo; Filip Dolegiewicz	Fencing	Men's team sabre	November 4
Silver	United States women's national field hockey team: Kelsey Bing; Sanne Caarls; Leah Crouse; Emma DeBerdine; Danielle Grega; Amanda Golini; Linnea Gonzales; Alexandra Hammel; Ashley Hoffman; Karlie Kisha; Ashley Sessa; Meredith Sholder; Abigail Tamer; Jillian Wolgemuth; Elizabeth Yeager; Madeleine Zimmer	Field hockey	Women's tournament	November 4
Silver	Ernesto Rodriguez; Kathleen Tocke	Sailing	Snipe	November 4
Silver	David Liebenberg; Sara Newberry Moore	Sailing	Nacra 17	November 4
Silver	Erika Ackerlund; Matthew McElroy; Seth Rider; Virginia Sereno	Triathlon	Mixed relay	November 4
Silver	Cholton Schultz	Wrestling	Men's Greco-Roman 130 kg	November 4
Silver	Omar Espinoza; Salvador Espinoza	Basque pelota	Men's doubles frontenis	November 5
Bronze	Payge Heyn	Roller sports	Women's street skateboarding	October 21
Bronze	Mary Tucker	Shooting	Women's 10 m air rifle	October 21
Bronze	James Plage	Swimming	Men's 400 m freestyle	October 21
Bronze	Jack Dahlgren	Swimming	Men's 200 m butterfly	October 21
Bronze	Kelly Pash	Swimming	Women's 200 m butterfly	October 21
Bronze	Melina Daniel	Taekwondo	Women's 49 kg	October 21
Bronze	Hailey Hernandez	Diving	Women's 1 m springboard	October 22
Bronze	Bryce Wettstein	Roller sports	Women's park skateboarding	October 22
Bronze	Henry Leverett	Shooting	Men's 25 m rapid fire pistol	October 22
Bronze	Arsenio Bustos	Swimming	Men's 100 m butterfly	October 22
Bronze	Camille Spink	Swimming	Women's 200 m freestyle	October 22
Bronze	Olivia Bray	Swimming	Women's 100 m butterfly	October 22
Bronze	Caitlyn Cox	Taekwondo	Women's 57 kg	October 22
Bronze	Kristina Teachout	Taekwondo	Women's 67 kg	October 22
Bronze	Meredith Alwine	Weightlifting	Women's 71 kg	October 22
Bronze	Jack Ryan	Diving	Men's 3 m springboard	October 23
Bronze	Donnell Whittenburg	Gymnastics	Men's artistic individual all-around	October 23
Bronze	Jordan Chiles	Gymnastics	Women's artistic individual all-around	October 23
Bronze	Gavin Barnick; Sagen Maddalena	Shooting	Mixed pairs air rifle	October 23
Bronze	Austen Smith; Dustan Taylor	Shooting	Mixed pairs skeet	October 23
Bronze	Zach Galla	Sport climbing	Men's boulder & lead	October 23
Bronze	Wil Gallant	Swimming	Men's 800 m freestyle	October 23
Bronze	Catie DeLoof	Swimming	Women's 100 m freestyle	October 23
Bronze	Anna Gay	Water skiing	Women's tricks	October 23
Bronze	Tyler Downs; Jack Ryan	Diving	Men's synchronized 3 m springboard	October 24
Bronze	Krysta Palmer	Diving	Women's 3 m springboard	October 24
Bronze	Alexis Lagan	Shooting	Women's 25 m pistol	October 24
Bronze	Catie DeLoof	Swimming	Women's 50 m freestyle	October 24
Bronze	Daniel Johnson	Water skiing	Men's wakeboard	October 24
Bronze	Anna Gay	Water skiing	Women's overall	October 24
Bronze	Hailey Hernandez; Krysta Palmer	Diving	Women's synchronized 3 m springboard	October 25
Bronze	Anna Marek	Equestrian	Individual dressage	October 25
Bronze	Brendan Anderson; Jessica Davis	Modern pentathlon	Mixed relay	October 25
Bronze	Daniel de la Rosa; Alejandro Landa; Adam Manilla	Racquetball	Men's team	October 25
Bronze	Michelle Key; Erika Manilla	Racquetball	Women's team	October 25
Bronze	Casey Fuller; Luke Rein	Rowing	Men's double sculls	October 25
Bronze	Kennedy Noble	Swimming	Women's 200 m individual medley	October 25
Bronze	Roscoe Hill	Boxing	Men's 51 kg	October 26
Bronze	Jajaira Gonzalez	Boxing	Women's 60 kg	October 26
Bronze	Rachel Tozier	Shooting	Women's trap	October 26
Bronze	David Domonoske; Grant Koontz; Colby Lange; Brendan Rhim	Cycling	Men's team pursuit	October 27
Bronze	Grant Koontz; Colby Lange	Cycling	Men's madison	October 27
Bronze	Mandy Marquardt	Cycling	Women's sprint	October 27
Bronze	Colleen Gulick; Chloe Patrick	Cycling	Women's madison	October 27
Bronze	Lucas Kozeniesky	Shooting	Men's 50 m rifle three positions	October 27
Bronze	Lisa Emmert; Nick Mowrer	Shooting	Mixed 10 m air pistol team	October 27
Bronze	Corinne Quiggle; Sarah Schermerhorn	Volleyball	Women's beach volleyball tournament	October 27
Bronze	Maria Laborde	Judo	Women's 48 kg	October 28
Bronze	Angelica Delgado	Judo	Women's 52 kg	October 28
Bronze	Evy Leibfarth	Canoeing	Women's kayak cross	October 29
Bronze	Ednah Kurgat	Athletics	Women's 10,000 m	October 30
Bronze	Tiffany Flynn	Athletics	Women's long jump	October 30
Bronze	Honour Finley; Jada Griffin; Richard Kuykendoll; Demarius Smith	Athletics	Mixed 4 × 400 m relay	October 30
Bronze	Alexander Knauf	Judo	Men's 90 kg	October 30
Bronze	Ryan Talbot	Athletics	Men's decathlon	October 31
Bronze	Alaysha Johnson	Athletics	Women's 100 m hurdles	November 1
Bronze	Marina Stefanoni	Squash	Women's singles	November 1
Bronze	Lily Zhang	Table tennis	Women's singles	November 1
Bronze	Casey Comber	Athletics	Men's 1500 m	November 2
Bronze	Adelaide Aquilla	Athletics	Women's shot put	November 2
Bronze	Jordan Gray	Athletics	Women's heptathlon	November 2
Bronze	Isabelle Connor; Gergana Petkova; Katrine Sakhnov; Karolina Saverino; Hana Starkman	Gymnastics	Women's rhythmic group all-around	November 2
Bronze	Jordan Geist	Athletics	Men's shot put	November 3
Bronze	Emily Mackay	Athletics	Women's 1500 m	November 3
Bronze	Maddie Harris	Athletics	Women's javelin throw	November 3
Bronze	Jonas Ecker; Aaron Small	Canoeing	Men's K-2 500 m	November 3
Bronze	McLain Ward	Equestrian	Individual jumping	November 3
Bronze	United States women's national under-19 soccer team: Emeri Adames; Aven Alvarez; Lizzie Boamah; Kendall Bodak; Jordyn Bugg; Katie Shea Collins; Nicki Fraser; Claire Hutton; Sonoma Kasica; Eleanor Klinger; Charlotte Kohler; Lauren Martinho; Ava McDonald; Grace Restovich; Sam Smith; Kealey Titmuss; Gisele Thompson; Amalia Villarreal	Football	Women's tournament	November 3
Bronze	Evita Griskenas	Gymnastics	Women's rhythmic individual hoop	November 3
Bronze	Evita Griskenas	Gymnastics	Women's rhythmic individual ball	November 3
Bronze	Isabelle Connor; Gergana Petkova; Katrine Sakhnov; Karolina Saverino; Hana Starkman	Gymnastics	Women's rhythmic group 5 hoops	November 3
Bronze	Noah Lyons	Sailing	Men's IQFoil	November 3
Bronze	Stephanie Roble; Maggie Shea	Sailing	49erFX	November 3
Bronze	Kayla Miracle	Wrestling	Women's 62 kg	November 3
Bronze	Rudy Winkler	Athletics	Men's hammer throw	November 4
Bronze	Vicki Chang	Breaking	B-Girls	November 4
Bronze	Augustus Cook; Nathan Humberston; Cole Jones; Sean Talbert	Canoeing	Men's K-4 500 m	November 4
Bronze	Evita Griskenas	Gymnastics	Women's rhythmic individual clubs	November 4
Bronze	Evita Griskenas	Gymnastics	Women's rhythmic individual ribbon	November 4
Bronze	Isabelle Connor; Gergana Petkova; Katrine Sakhnov; Karolina Saverino; Hana Starkman	Gymnastics	Women's rhythmic group 3 ribbons + 2 balls	November 4
Bronze	Saisheren Senpon	Karate	Men's 84 kg	November 4
Bronze	Erin Jackson	Roller sports	Women's 200 m time-trial	November 4
Bronze	Jishan Liang; Nandan Naresh; Siddartha Naresh	Table tennis	Men's team	November 4
Bronze	Casey Kaufhold	Archery	Women's individual recurve	November 5
Bronze	Breanna Clemmer	Bowling	Women's singles	November 5
Bronze	Dylan Menante	Golf	Men's individual	November 5
Bronze	Skylar Lingl	Karate	Women's 68 kg	November 5

Medals by sport
Sport	1st place, gold medalist(s)	2nd place, silver medalist(s)	3rd place, bronze medalist(s)	Total
Swimming	21	17	10	**48**
Gymnastics	10	4	9	**23**
Athletics	8	5	12	**25**
Fencing	8	3	0	**11**
Wrestling	7	3	1	**11**
Shooting	5	5	8	**18**
Archery	5	4	1	**10**
Rowing	5	4	1	**10**
Water skiing	5	1	3	**9**
Sport climbing	4	4	1	**9**
Sailing	4	3	2	**9**
Cycling	4	2	4	**10**
Taekwondo	4	1	3	**8**
Equestrian	3	2	2	**7**
Squash	3	2	1	**6**
Canoeing	3	1	3	**7**
Karate	3	0	2	**5**
Surfing	3	0	0	**3**
Boxing	2	2	2	**6**
Weightlifting	2	1	1	**4**
Roller sports	2	0	3	**5**
Table tennis	2	0	2	**4**
Bowling	2	0	1	**3**
Basketball	2	0	0	**2**
Water polo	2	0	0	**2**
Badminton	1	3	0	**4**
Breaking	1	1	1	**3**
Racquetball	1	0	2	**3**
Rugby sevens	1	0	0	**1**
Softball	1	0	0	**1**
Artistic swimming	0	2	0	**2**
Triathlon	0	2	0	**2**
Modern pentathlon	0	1	1	**2**
Basque pelota	0	1	0	**1**
Field hockey	0	1	0	**1**
Diving	0	0	5	**5**
Judo	0	0	3	**3**
Football	0	0	1	**1**
Golf	0	0	1	**1**
Volleyball	0	0	1	**1**
Total	124	75	87	286

Medals by day
Day	Date	1st place, gold medalist(s)	2nd place, silver medalist(s)	3rd place, bronze medalist(s)	Total
1	October 21	9	5	6	**20**
2	October 22	11	6	9	**26**
3	October 23	21	7	9	**37**
4	October 24	10	10	6	**26**
5	October 25	8	10	7	**25**
6	October 26	0	2	3	**5**
7	October 27	2	4	7	**13**
8	October 28	0	0	2	**2**
9	October 29	7	1	1	**9**
10	October 30	4	0	4	**8**
11	October 31	4	2	1	**7**
12	November 1	8	2	3	**13**
13	November 2	6	6	4	**16**
14	November 3	10	5	12	**27**
15	November 4	16	14	9	**39**
16	November 5	8	1	4	**13**
Total		124	75	87	286

Medals by gender
Gender	1st place, gold medalist(s)	2nd place, silver medalist(s)	3rd place, bronze medalist(s)	Total
Female	62	32	54	**148**
Male	52	36	28	**116**
Mixed	10	7	5	**22**
Total	124	75	87	286

Multiple medalists
Name	Sport	1st place, gold medalist(s)	2nd place, silver medalist(s)	3rd place, bronze medalist(s)	Total
Jonny Kulow	Swimming	2	4	0	**6**
Olivia Bray	Swimming	2	2	1	**5**
Kelly Pash	Swimming	2	2	1	**5**
Catie DeLoof	Swimming	0	3	2	**5**
Evita Griskenas	Gymnastics	0	1	4	**5**
Jacob Foster	Swimming	4	0	0	**4**
Jack Aikins	Swimming	3	1	0	**4**
Paige Madden	Swimming	3	1	0	**4**
Veronica Nicacio	Rowing	3	1	0	**4**
Coby Carrozza	Swimming	2	2	0	**4**
Isabela Darvin	Rowing	2	2	0	**4**
Lukas Miller	Swimming	2	2	0	**4**
Hannah Paynter	Rowing	2	2	0	**4**
Kennedy Noble	Swimming	2	1	1	**4**
Gabi Albiero	Swimming	1	3	0	**4**
Jack Dahlgren	Swimming	1	2	1	**4**
Brooks Curry	Swimming	0	4	0	**4**
Regina Jaquess	Water skiing	3	0	0	**3**
Kayla DiCello	Gymnastics	2	1	0	**3**
Olivia Fiechter	Squash	2	1	0	**3**
Madeleine Focht	Rowing	2	1	0	**3**
Rachel Stege	Swimming	2	1	0	**3**
Kayla Wilson	Swimming	2	1	0	**3**
Casey Kaufhold	Archery	2	0	1	**3**
Mary Tucker	Shooting	2	0	1	**3**
Donnell Whittenburg	Gymnastics	2	0	1	**3**
Amy Fulmer	Swimming	1	2	0	**3**
Lauren Miller	Rowing	1	2	0	**3**
Cristina Pretto	Rowing	1	2	0	**3**
Alexis Ruiz	Archery	1	2	0	**3**
Amanda Sobhy	Squash	1	2	0	**3**
Arsenio Bustos	Swimming	1	1	1	**3**
Jordan Chiles	Gymnastics	1	1	1	**3**
Sagen Maddalena	Shooting	1	1	1	**3**
Camille Spink	Swimming	1	1	1	**3**
Reilly Tiltmann	Swimming	0	3	0	**3**
Isabelle Connor	Gymnastics	0	0	3	**3**
Gergana Petkova	Gymnastics	0	0	3	**3**
Katrine Sakhnov	Gymnastics	0	0	3	**3**
Karolina Saverino	Gymnastics	0	0	3	**3**
Hana Starkman	Gymnastics	0	0	3	**3**
Ezra Carlson	Rowing	2	0	0	**2**
Olivia Clyne	Squash	2	0	0	**2**
Brady Ellison	Archery	2	0	0	**2**
Vincent Hancock	Shooting	2	0	0	**2**
Alexander Hedge	Rowing	2	0	0	**2**
Nick Itkin	Fencing	2	0	0	**2**
Lee Kiefer	Fencing	2	0	0	**2**
Kaliya Lincoln	Gymnastics	2	0	0	**2**
Zoe Miller	Gymnastics	2	0	0	**2**
Jackson Mirich	Archery	2	0	0	**2**
Curran Phillips	Gymnastics	2	0	0	**2**
Magda Skarbonkiewicz	Fencing	2	0	0	**2**
Jessica Stevens	Gymnastics	2	0	0	**2**
Rachel Sung	Table tennis	2	0	0	**2**
Amy Wang	Table tennis	2	0	0	**2**
Maia Chamberlain	Fencing	1	1	0	**2**
Miles Chamley-Watson	Fencing	1	1	0	**2**
Andrew Doddo	Fencing	1	1	0	**2**
Kent Farrington	Equestrian	1	1	0	**2**
Josephine Fuller	Swimming	1	1	0	**2**
Katherine Horvat	Rowing	1	1	0	**2**
Grace Joyce	Rowing	1	1	0	**2**
Rylan Kissel	Shooting	1	1	0	**2**
Mason Laur	Swimming	1	1	0	**2**
College Lucas-Conwell	Rowing	1	1	0	**2**
Noah Nichols	Swimming	1	1	0	**2**
Christopher O'Connor	Swimming	1	1	0	**2**
Caroline Pamukcu	Equestrian	1	1	0	**2**
Colt Walker	Gymnastics	1	1	0	**2**
Breanna Clemmer	Bowling	1	0	1	**2**
Erin Jackson	Roller sports	1	0	1	**2**
Evy Leibfarth	Canoeing	1	0	1	**2**
Adam Manilla	Racquetball	1	0	1	**2**
Erika Manilla	Racquetball	1	0	1	**2**
Anna Marek	Equestrian	1	0	1	**2**
McLain Ward	Equestrian	1	0	1	**2**
Lily Zhang	Table tennis	1	0	1	**2**
Megumi Field	Artistic swimming	0	2	0	**2**
Jennie Gai	Badminton	0	2	0	**2**
Matthew McElroy	Triathlon	0	2	0	**2**
Ruby Remati	Artistic swimming	0	2	0	**2**
Kris Schaff	Archery	0	2	0	**2**
Sawyer Sullivan	Archery	0	2	0	**2**
Brendan Anderson	Modern pentathlon	0	1	1	**2**
Jonas Ecker	Canoeing	0	1	1	**2**
Alexis Lagan	Shooting	0	1	1	**2**
Mandy Marquardt	Cycling	0	1	1	**2**
James Plage	Swimming	0	1	1	**2**
Anna Gay	Water skiing	0	0	2	**2**
Grant Koontz	Cycling	0	0	2	**2**
Colby Lange	Cycling	0	0	2	**2**
Krysta Palmer	Diving	0	0	2	**2**
Jack Ryan	Diving	0	0	2	**2**

^{a} Athletes who participated in the heats only.

== Competitors ==
The following is the list of number of competitors (per gender) participating at the games per sport/discipline.

Sport	Men	Women	Total
Archery	6	5	11
Artistic swimming	1	8	9
Athletics	40	37	77
Badminton	4	4	8
Basketball	4	4	8
Basque pelota	3	0	3
Bowling	2	2	4
Boxing	7	6	13
Breaking	2	2	4
Canoeing	11	9	20
Cycling	12	16	28
Diving	5	5	10
Equestrian	4	8	12
Fencing	9	6	15
Field hockey	16	16	32
Football	18	18	36
Golf	2	2	4
Gymnastics	8	15	23
Handball	14	0	14
Judo	6	8	14
Karate	7	6	13
Modern pentathlon	2	3	5
Racquetball	3	2	5
Roller sports	5	5	10
Rowing	10	11	21
Rugby sevens	12	12	24
Sailing	9	10	19
Shooting	12	10	22
Softball	—N/a	16	16
Sport climbing	6	6	12
Squash	3	4	7
Surfing	3	1	4
Swimming	20	20	40
Table tennis	3	3	6
Taekwondo	7	6	13
Tennis	3	1	4
Triathlon	3	3	6
Volleyball	2	2	4
Water polo	12	12	24
Water skiing	2	4	6
Weightlifting	4	5	9
Wrestling	11	6	17
Total	313	318	631

== Archery ==
The United States qualified one archer after winning the respective event at the 2021 Junior Pan American Games. The United States also qualified an additional ten archers during the 2022 Pan American Archery Championships.

Men

Athlete	Event	Ranking Round		Round of 32	Round of 16	Quarterfinals	Semifinals	Final / BM	
Athlete	Event	Score	Seed	Opposition Score	Opposition Score	Opposition Score	Opposition Score	Opposition Score	Rank
Brady Ellison	Individual recurve	685	2	Muñoz (PUR); W 6–0	Franco (CUB); W 7–1	Rojas (MEX); W 6–5	Grande (MEX); L 4–6	Bronze medal final Soto (CHI); L 4–6	4
Jackson Mirich	Individual recurve	671	9	Aguilar (CHI); W 6–2	Arcila (COL); W 6–0	Vega (CUB); W 6–0	Soto (CHI); W 6–2	Grande (MEX); W 6–4	1st place, gold medalist(s)
Jack Williams	Individual recurve	678	5	Velarde (PER); W 6–2	Ticas (ESA); W 7–3	Soto (CHI); L 2–6	Did not advance		
Kris Schaff	Individual compound	715 PR	1	—N/a	Spicer-Moran (CAN); W 149–148	Pizarro (PUR); L 146–147	Did not advance		
Sawyer Sullivan	Individual compound	703	6	—N/a	Garcia (MEX); W 147–145	Martin (CHI); W 147–143	Singh (COL); W 144–144	Pizarro (PUR); L 144–145	2nd place, silver medalist(s)
Trenton Cowles; Brady Ellison; Jackson Mirich; Jack Williams	Team recurve	2034	1	—N/a		Independent Athletes Team; W 6–0	Brazil; W 6–2	Mexico; W 6–2	1st place, gold medalist(s)
Kris Schaff; Sawyer Sullivan	Team compound	1418 PR	1	—N/a		Bye	Mexico; W 158–157	El Salvador; L 156–158	2nd place, silver medalist(s)

Women

Athlete	Event	Ranking Round		Round of 32	Round of 16	Quarterfinals	Semifinals	Final / BM	
Athlete	Event	Score	Seed	Opposition Score	Opposition Score	Opposition Score	Opposition Score	Opposition Score	Rank
Catalina GNoriega	Individual recurve	630	13	Cotto (PUR); W 6–0	Baeza (CHI); W 6–0	Rendón (COL); L 2–6	Did not advance		
Casey Kaufhold	Individual recurve	674	2	Cortez (ESA); W 6–0	Chacon (VEN); W 6–4	Chénier (CAN); W 6–2	Machado (BRA); L 4–6	Bronze medal final Rendón (COL); W 6–0	3rd place, bronze medalist(s)
Jennifer Mucino-Fernandez	Individual recurve	644	8	Enríquez (EAI); W 6–0	Sepúlveda (COL); W 6–0	Valencia (MEX); L 3–7	Did not advance		
Olivia Dean	Individual compound	699	4	—N/a	Zebadúa (EAI); W 145–143	Quintero (MEX); L 142–145	Did not advance		
Alexis Ruiz	Individual compound	705	2	—N/a	Aliaga (PER); W 149–141	Ramirez (PUR); W 148–147	Usquiano (COL); W 145–144	Quintero (MEX); L 145–147	2nd place, silver medalist(s)
Catalina GNoriega; Casey Kaufhold; Jennifer Mucino-Fernandez	Team recurve	1948	2	—N/a		Cuba; W 6–0	Colombia; W 6–2	Mexico; W 5–1	1st place, gold medalist(s)
Olivia Dean; Alexis Ruiz	Team compound	1404	2	—N/a		Bye	Mexico; W 156–151	Colombia; W 160–153	1st place, gold medalist(s)

Mixed

Athlete	Event	Ranking Round		Round of 16	Quarterfinals	Semifinals	Final / BM	
Athlete	Event	Score	Seed	Opposition Score	Opposition Score	Opposition Score	Opposition Score	Rank
Brady Ellison; Casey Kaufhold	Team recurve	1359	1	Bye	Cuba; W 6–2	Colombia; W 5–3	Brazil; W 6–2	1st place, gold medalist(s)
Alexis Ruiz; Kris Schaff	Team compound	1420 PR	1	—N/a	Chile; W 157–151	Brazil; W 158–156	Colombia; L 150–156	2nd place, silver medalist(s)

== Artistic swimming ==
The United States automatically qualified a full team of nine artistic swimmers.

Athlete	Event	Technical Routine		Free Routine		Acrobatic routine		Total	
Athlete	Event	Points	Rank	Points	Rank	Points	Rank	Points	Rank
Megumi Field; Ruby Remati	Women's duet	238.8467	2	212.8292	2	—N/a		451.6758	2nd place, silver medalist(s)
Anatia Alvarez; Jaime Czarkowski; Megumi Field; Audrey Kwon; Calista Liu; Jacklyn Luu; Bill May; Dani Ramirez; Ruby Remati	Team	253.8008	2	295.3667	1	236.4233	1	785.5908	2nd place, silver medalist(s)

== Athletics ==
The United States has qualified 77 athletes for the games.

Key

- Note–Ranks given for track events are within the athlete's heat only
- Q = Qualified for the next round
- q = Qualified for the next round as a fastest loser
- * = Athlete ran in the heat but not the final
- Bye = Athlete not required to compete in round

Men
Track & road events

Athlete	Event	Semifinal		Final	
Athlete	Event	Time	Rank	Time	Rank
Chris Royster	100 m	10.38	3	Did not advance	
Evan Miller	200 m	DQ		Did not advance	
Richard Kuykendoll	400 m	47.36	4 q	48.66	7
Abraham Alvarado	800 m	1:47.72	3	Did not advance	
Derek Holdsworth	800 m	1:48.41	6	Did not advance	
Casey Comber	1500 m	—N/a		3:39.90	3rd place, bronze medalist(s)
Kasey Knevelbaard	1500 m	—N/a		3:40.31	5
Emmanuel Bor	5000 m	—N/a		14:55.53	6
Kasey Knevelbaard	5000 m	—N/a		14:47.69	1st place, gold medalist(s)
Samuel Chelanga	10,000 m	—N/a		29:01.21	2nd place, silver medalist(s)
Isai Rodriguez	10,000 m	—N/a		28:17.84	1st place, gold medalist(s)
Dylan Beard	110 m hurdles	—N/a		14.15	6
De'Vion Wilson	110 m hurdles	—N/a		13.78	2nd place, silver medalist(s)
Chris Robinson	400 m hurdles	DNS		Did not advance	
James Smith	400 m hurdles	51.42	6 q	50.02	5
Jackson Mestler	3000 m steeplechase	—N/a		9:05.18	10
Daniel Michalski	3000 m steeplechase	—N/a		8:36.47	2nd place, silver medalist(s)
Ilias Garcia; Terrance Laird; Christopher Royster; Demarius Smith	4 × 100 m relay	38.89	1 Q	DNF	
Derek Holdsworth; Richard Kuykendoll; Evan Miller; Christopher Royster	4 × 400 m relay	—N/a		3:08.67	5
Turner Wiley	Marathon	—N/a		2:20:25	9
Nick Christie	20 km walk	—N/a		1:30:00	13
Emmanuel Corvera	20 km walk	—N/a		1:36:21	14

Field events

Athlete	Event	Result	Rank
Jermel Jones II	Long jump	7.32	9
Damarcus Simpson	Long jump	7.55	8
Chris Benard	Triple jump	16.48	4
Omar Craddock	Triple jump	15.67	7
Dontavious Hill	High jump	2.21	6
Eli Kosiba	High jump	2.15	11
Zach Bradford	Pole vault	5.20	7
Matt Ludwig	Pole vault	5.55	1st place, gold medalist(s)
Jordan Geist	Shot put	20.53	3rd place, bronze medalist(s)
Roger Steen	Shot put	20.51	4
Joseph Brown	Discus throw	60.14	5
Dallin Shurts	Discus throw	57.00	8
Curtis Thompson	Javelin throw	79.65	1st place, gold medalist(s)
Capers Williamson	Javelin throw	76.29	4
Daniel Haugh	Hammer throw	77.62	2nd place, silver medalist(s)
Rudy Winkler	Hammer throw	76.65	3rd place, bronze medalist(s)

Combined events – Decathlon

Athlete	Event	100 m	LJ	SP	HJ	400 m	110H	DT	PV	JT	1500 m	Total	Rank
Samuel Black	Result	10.97	7.22	14.65	2.04	49.90	14.63	42.05	4.10	48.64	4:51.21	7585	5
Samuel Black	Points	867	866	768	840	819	895	706	645	568	611	7585	5
Ryan Talbot	Result	11.02	6.57	15.14	1.95	49.05	15.00	50.66	4.80	57.76	4:57.14	7742	3rd place, bronze medalist(s)
Ryan Talbot	Points	856	713	798	653	859	850	884	849	704	576	7742	3rd place, bronze medalist(s)

Women
Track & road events

Athlete	Event	Semifinal		Final	
Athlete	Event	Time	Rank	Time	Rank
Kennedy Blackmon	100 m	11.74	5	Did not advance	
Kortnei Johnson	100 m	11.83	6	Did not advance	
Brenna Detra	800 m	2:06.77	3 Q	2:07.27	7
Brooke Feldmeier	800 m	2:06.37	4 q	2:06.10	6
Emily Mackay	1500 m	—N/a		4:12.02	3rd place, bronze medalist(s)
Emily Infeld	5000 m	—N/a		16:09.53	4
Taylor Werner	5000 m	—N/a		16:06.48	2nd place, silver medalist(s)
Ednah Kurgat	10,000 m	—N/a		33:16.61	3rd place, bronze medalist(s)
Emily Venters	10,000 m	—N/a		DNS	
Alaysha Johnson	100 m hurdles	12.99	1 Q	13.19	3rd place, bronze medalist(s)
Marisa Howard	3000 m steeplechase	—N/a		9:49.27	4
Logan Jolly	3000 m steeplechase	—N/a		10:03.08	7
Taylor Anderson; Kennedy Blackmon; Alaysha Johnson; Kortnei Johnson*; Shannon Ray	4 × 100 m relay	44.83	3 Q	1:01.30	7
Kendall Baisden; Honour Finley; Jada Griffin; Erin Marsh	4 × 400 m relay	—N/a		3:35.91	5
Stephanie Casey	20 km walk	—N/a		No result^{N}	14
Maria Michta-Coffey	20 km walk	—N/a		No result^{N}	13

^{N} - The results for the women's 20 km race walk were declared void after the race distance was remeasured and found to be 3 km short.

Field events

Athlete	Event	Result	Rank
Tiffany Flynn	Long jump	6.40	3rd place, bronze medalist(s)
Jasmine Todd	Long jump	NM	
Euphenie Andre	Triple jump	12.14	9
Mylana Hearn	Triple jump	13.32	5
Rylee Anderson	High jump	1.75	7
Rachel McCoy	High jump	1.87	1st place, gold medalist(s)
Nastassja Campbell	Pole vault	4.10	7
Bridget Williams	Pole vault	4.60	1st place, gold medalist(s)
Adelaide Aquilla	Shot put	17.73	3rd place, bronze medalist(s)
Elena Bruckner	Discus throw	57.61	6
Veronica Fraley	Discus throw	NM	
Maddie Harris	Javelin throw	60.06	3rd place, bronze medalist(s)
Rebekah Wales	Javelin throw	54.31	8
Brooke Andersen	Hammer throw	NM	
DeAnna Price	Hammer throw	72.34	1st place, gold medalist(s)

Combined events – Heptathlon

Athlete	Event	100H	HJ	SP	200 m	LJ	JT	800 m	Total	Rank
Jordan Gray	Result	14.02	1.73	13.11	25.73	5.58	30.28	2:16.91	5494	3rd place, bronze medalist(s)
Jordan Gray	Points	976	891	735	821	723	482	866	5494	3rd place, bronze medalist(s)
Erin Marsh	Result	13.39	1.64	12.71	24.18	6.27	35.71	2:18.57	5882	1st place, gold medalist(s)
Erin Marsh	Points	1066	783	708	963	934	585	843	5882	1st place, gold medalist(s)

Mixed

Athlete	Event	Result	Rank
Honour Finley; Jada Griffin; Richard Kuykendoll; Demarius Smith	4 × 400 m relay	3:19.41	3rd place, bronze medalist(s)
Nick Christie; Miranda Melville	Marathon walk	3:16:52	6

== Badminton ==
The United States qualified a full team of eight athletes (four men and four women).

Men

Athlete	Event	Round of 32	Round of 16	Quarterfinals	Semifinals	Final / BM	
Athlete	Event	Opposition Result	Opposition Result	Opposition Result	Opposition Result	Opposition Result	Rank
Justin Ma	Singles	Cordón (EAI); L (13–21, 12–21)	Did not advance				
Howard Shu	Singles	Otero (ARG); W (21–10, 21–12)	Huebla (ECU); W (23–21, 21–8)	Canjura (ESA); L (12–21, 3–21)	Did not advance		
Vinson Chiu; Josh Yuan	Doubles	—N/a	Alas / Mejia (ESA); W (21–6, 21–10)	Farias / Silva (BRA); L (19–21, 21–15, 18–21)	Did not advance		

Women

Athlete	Event	Round of 64	Round of 32	Round of 16	Quarterfinals	Semifinals	Final / BM	
Athlete	Event	Opposition Result	Opposition Result	Opposition Result	Opposition Result	Opposition Result	Opposition Result	Rank
Jennie Gai	Singles	Bye	Chiong (EAI); W (21–9, 21–11)	Richardson (JAM); W (21–14, 21–5)	Zhang (CAN); W (21–12, 21–18)	Oropesa (CUB); W (22–20, 21–7)	Zhang (USA); L (8–21, 12–21)	2nd place, silver medalist(s)
Beiwen Zhang	Singles	Bye	Rojas (VEN); W (21–6, 21–3)	Lima (BRA); W (21–14, 21–6)	Sotomayor (EAI); W (21–8, 21–6)	Chan (CAN); W (21–16, 21–11)	Gai (USA); W (21–8, 21–12)	1st place, gold medalist(s)
Annie Xu; Kerry Xu	Doubles	—N/a		Gualdi / Oliva (ARG); W (21–6, 21–5)	Corleto / Sotomayor (EAI); W (21–8, 21–6)	Lima / Vieira (BRA); W (21–7, 21–18)	Choi / Wu (CAN); L (18–21, 21–10, 17–21)	2nd place, silver medalist(s)

Mixed

Athlete	Event	Round of 32	Round of 16	Quarterfinals	Semifinals	Final / BM	
Athlete	Event	Opposition Result	Opposition Result	Opposition Result	Opposition Result	Opposition Result	Rank
Vinson Chiu; Jennie Gai	Doubles	Bye	Torre Regal / Mini (PER); W (21–5, 21–6)	Huebla / Zambrano (ECU); W (21–8, 21–8)	Lima / Silva (BRA); W (20–22, 21–16, 21–16)	Lindeman / Wu (CAN); L (21–17, 17–21, 19–21)	2nd place, silver medalist(s)

== Basketball ==
=== 5x5 ===
The United States qualified a men's team (of 12 athletes) by finishing third in the 2022 FIBA Americup. The United States also qualified a women's team (of 12 athletes) after a runner-up finish at the 2023 FIBA Women's AmeriCup. However, both teams declined the invitations.

=== 3x3 ===
Summary

Team	Event	Preliminary round			Quarterfinal	Semifinal	Final / BM / Pl.	
Team	Event	Opposition Result	Opposition Result	Rank	Opposition Result	Opposition Result	Opposition Result	Rank
United States men's	Men's tournament	El Salvador; W 22–8	Mexico; W 21–18	1 Q	Uruguay; W 21–10	Trinidad and Tobago; W 21–9	Chile; W 21–15	1st place, gold medalist(s)
United States women's	Women's tournament	Dominican Republic; W 22–11	Mexico; W 21–9	1 Q	Venezuela; W 21–6	Chile; W 21–14	Colombia; W 21–14	1st place, gold medalist(s)

==== Men's tournament ====
The United States qualified a men's team (of 4 athletes) by winning the 2022 FIBA 3x3 AmeriCup.

Preliminary round

Pos	Team	Pld	W	L	PF	PA	PD	Qualification
1	United States	2	2	0	43	26	+17	Quarterfinals
2	Mexico	2	1	1	40	33	+7	Quarterfinals
3	El Salvador	2	0	2	20	44	−24	

Source: Report
Rules for classification: 1) Wins; 2) Head-to-head record; 3) Points scored.

21 October 2023
19:30

Report

United States	22–8	El Salvador
Pts: Fredette 9		Pts: Merino 7

Estadio Español
Referees: Felipe Valenzuela (CHI) / Ana Zachi (BRA)

22 October 2023
15:00

Report

United States	21–18	Mexico
Pts: Fredette 11		Pts: Zesati 8

Estadio Español
Referees: Lautaro Ojeda (ARG) / Sonia Maldonado (PUR)

Quarterfinal

22 October 2023
19:00

Report

United States	21–10	Uruguay
Pts: Fredette 9		Pts: Cardozo 4

Estadio Español
Referees: Felipe Valenzuela (CHI) / Yilizeth Vence (COL)

Semifinal

23 October 2023
17:00

Report

United States	21–9	Trinidad and Tobago
Pts: Fredette 11		Pts: Ahkeel Boyd 5

Estadio Español
Referees: Felipe Valenzuela (CHI) / Yilizeth Vence (COL)

Gold medal game

23 October 2023
20:00

Report

United States	21–15	Chile
Pts: Barry 8		Pts: Rubio 7

Estadio Español
Referees: Sonia Maldonado (PUR) / Jorge Garcia (DOM)

==== Women's tournament ====
The United States qualified a women's team (of 4 athletes) by finishing third in the 2022 FIBA 3x3 AmeriCup.

Preliminary round

Pos	Team	Pld	W	L	PF	PA	PD	Qualification
1	United States	2	2	0	43	20	+23	Quarterfinals
2	Mexico	2	1	1	28	33	−5	Quarterfinals
3	Dominican Republic	2	0	2	23	41	−18	

Source: Report
Rules for classification: 1) Wins; 2) Head-to-head record; 3) Points scored.

21 October 2023
18:00

Report

United States	22–11	Dominican Republic
Pts: Stevens 10		Pts: Jiménez 5

Estadio Español Las Condes, Santiago
Referees: María Olivieri (ARG), Yilzeth Vence (COL)

22 October 2023
13:00

Report

United States	22–9	Mexico
Pts: Stevens 7		Pts: Rovira 4

Estadio Español Las Condes, Santiago
Referees: Marie Houlie (CAN), Ana Zachi (BRA)

Quarterfinal

22 October 2023
17:00

Report

United States	21–6	Venezuela
Pts: Dietrick 9		Pts: Sánchez 4

Estadio Español Las Condes, Santiago
Referees: Lautaro Ojeda (ARG), Jorge García (DOM)

Semifinal

23 October 2023
16:00

Report

United States	21–14	Chile
Pts: Stevens 7		Pts: Novión 8

Estadio Español Las Condes, Santiago
Referees: María Olivieri (ARG), Nicolás Sarli (URU)

Gold medal game

23 October 2023
18:30

Report

United States	21–14	Colombia
Pts: Stevens 11		Pts: Muñoz 6

Estadio Español Las Condes, Santiago
Referees: Felipe Valenzuela (CHI), María Olivieri (ARG)

== Basque pelota ==
The United States qualified a team of three male athletes through the 2022 Basque Pelota World Championship and the 2023 Pan American Basque Pelota Tournament.

Athlete	Event	Preliminary round					Semifinal	Final / BM	
Athlete	Event	Opposition Score	Opposition Score	Opposition Score	Opposition Score	Rank	Opposition Score	Opposition Score	Rank
Omar Espinoza; Salvador Espinoza	Men's doubles frontenis	Cruz / Olvera (MEX); L 0–2	Cardozo / García (ARG); W 2–0	García / González (CHI); W 2–0	Bezada / Yupanqui (PER); W 2–0	2 FG	—N/a	Cruz / Olvera (MEX); L 0–2	2nd place, silver medalist(s)
Israel Mateos	Men's frontball	Otheguy (BRA); L 0–2	Abréu (CUB); L 0–2	Quinto (PER); L 1–2	—N/a	4	Did not advance		

== Bowling ==
The United States qualified two men and two women through the 2022 PABCON Champion of Champions held in Rio de Janeiro, Brazil.

Athlete	Event	Ranking round		Semifinal	Final	
Athlete	Event	Score	Rank	Opposition Result	Opposition Result	Rank
A.J. Johnson	Men's singles	3511	3 Q	Moretti (CRC); W 680–666	Hupe (CAN); W 795–727	1st place, gold medalist(s)
Brandon Bonta	Men's singles	3432	6	Did not advance		
A.J. Johnson; Kris Prather	Men's doubles	3171	9	—N/a		
Breanna Clemmer	Women's singles	3278	4 Q	Guerrero (COL); L 637–678	Did not advance	3rd place, bronze medalist(s)
Jordan Richard	Women's singles	3063	12	Did not advance		
Breanna Clemmer; Jordan Richard	Women's doubles	3274	1st place, gold medalist(s)	—N/a		

== Boxing ==
The United States qualified 13 boxers (seven men and six women).

Men

Athlete	Event	Round of 32	Round of 16	Quarterfinal	Semifinal	Final	
Athlete	Event	Opposition Result	Opposition Result	Opposition Result	Opposition Result	Opposition Result	Rank
Roscoe Hill	–51 kg	—N/a	Claro (CUB); W 2–2^{WP}	Martínez (COL); W 4–1	Alacantra (DOM); L 1–4	Did not advance	3rd place, bronze medalist(s)
Jahmal Harvey	–57 kg	—N/a	Bye	Allicock (GUY); W 5–0	Oliveira (BRA); W 5–0	Horta (CUB); W 5–0	1st place, gold medalist(s)
Emilio Garcia	–63.5 kg	Bye	Cova (VEN); W 5–0	de la Cruz (DOM); L 0–2	Did not advance		
Omari Jones	–71 kg	—N/a	Llanos (PUR); W 4–0	Verde (MEX); L 0–5	Did not advance		
Robby Gonzales	–80 kg	—N/a	Pinales (DOM); L 2–3	Did not advance			
Jamar Talley	–92 kg	—N/a	La Cruz (CUB); L 0–5	Did not advance			
Joshua Edwards	+92 kg	—N/a	Bye	Congo (ECU); W 5–0	Arzola (CUB); W 5–0	Teixeira (BRA); W WO	1st place, gold medalist(s)

Women

Athlete	Event	Round of 16	Quarterfinal	Semifinal	Final	
Athlete	Event	Opposition Result	Opposition Result	Opposition Result	Opposition Result	Rank
Jennifer Lozano	–50 kg	Águas (ECU); W 3–2	Cedeño (VEN); W 3–2	Wright (CAN); W 5–0	de Almeida (BRA); L 0–5	2nd place, silver medalist(s)
Yoseline Perez	–54 kg	Arias (COL); L 1–4	Did not advance			
Alyssa Mendoza	–57 kg	Al-Ahmadieh (CAN); L 2–3	Did not advance			
Jajaira Gonzalez	–60 kg	Takhar (CAN); W RSC	Piñeiro (URU); W 5–0	Ferreira (BRA); L 1–4	Did not advance	3rd place, bronze medalist(s)
Morelle McCane	–66 kg	Bye	Vega (CRC); W RSC	Cavanagh (CAN); W 5–0	Dos Santos (BRA); L 0–5	2nd place, silver medalist(s)
Naomi Graham	–75 kg	Bye	Ortiz (MEX); L 0–5	Did not advance		

== Breaking ==
The United States qualified two male and two female breakdancers at the 2023 Pan American Championships.

Athlete	Nickname	Event	Round robin				Quarterfinal	Semifinal	Final / BM	
Athlete	Nickname	Event	Opposition Result	Opposition Result	Opposition Result	Rank	Opposition Result	Opposition Result	Opposition Result	Rank
Jeffery Louis	Jeffro	B-Boys	Alvin (COL); W 2–0	Kastrito (MEX); W 2–0	Dux-M (DOM); T 1–1	1 Q	Rato (BRA); W 2–0	Matita (CHI); W 3–0	Phil Wizard (CAN); L 0–3	2nd place, silver medalist(s)
Miguel Rosario	Gravity	B-Boys	Rato (BRA); W 2–0	NiñoNino (MEX); W 2–0	Broly (ARG); W 2–0	1 Q	Alvin (COL); W 2–0	Phil Wizard (CAN); L 0–3	Bronze medal final Matita (CHI); L 1–2	4
Vicki Chang	La Vix	B-Girls	Swami (MEX); W 2–0	Monchi (PER); W 2–0	Abril (ARG); W 2–0	1 Q	Mini Japa (BRA); W 2–0	Luma (COL); L 1–2	Bronze medal final Tiff (CAN); W 3–0	3rd place, bronze medalist(s)
Grace Choi	Sunny	B-Girls	Mini Japa (BRA); W 2–0	Nathana (BRA); W 2–0	Menta (CHI); W 2–0	1 Q	Swami (MEX); W 2–0	Tiff (CAN); W 3–0	Luma (COL); W 3–0	1st place, gold medalist(s)

== Canoeing ==
=== Slalom ===
The United States qualified five slalom athletes (three men and two women).

Men

Athlete	Event	Preliminary round			Semifinal		Final	
Athlete	Event	Run 1	Run 2	Rank	Result	Rank	Result	Rank
Zachary Lokken	C-1	~~82.23~~	80.60	1 Q	147.00	6 Q	95.87	1st place, gold medalist(s)
Joshua Joseph	K-1	77.35	~~77.64~~	3 Q	139.81	6 Q	91.12	1st place, gold medalist(s)
Joshua Joseph	EK-1	53.75	—N/a	11	Did not advance			
Kyler Long	EK-1	50.90	—N/a	3 Q	4		Did not advance	

Women

Athlete	Event	Preliminary round			Repechage	Semifinal		Final	
Athlete	Event	Run 1	Run 2	Rank	Rank	Time	Rank	Time	Rank
Marcella Altman	C-1	~~107.05~~	100.47	4 Q	—N/a	149.51	4 Q	186.81	5
Evy Leibfarth	K-1	~~81.93~~	80.26	1 Q	—N/a	102.44	1 Q	102.32	1st place, gold medalist(s)
Marcella Altman	EK-1	65.96	—N/a	13	Did not advance				
Evy Leibfarth	EK-1	52.75	—N/a	2 Q	Bye	1 Q		3rd place, bronze medalist(s)	

=== Sprint ===
The United States qualified a total of 15 sprint athletes (eight men and seven women).

Men

Athlete	Event	Heat		Semifinal		Final	
Athlete	Event	Time	Rank	Time	Rank	Time	Rank
Jonathan Grady	C-1 1000 m	4:09.12	2 FA	Bye		4:16.64	8
Jonathan Grady; Ian Ross	C-2 500 m	—N/a				1:49.39	6
Jonas Ecker	K-1 1000 m	3:42.45	2 FA	Bye		3:34.25	2nd place, silver medalist(s)
Jonas Ecker; Aaron Small	K-2 500 m	1:33.66	2 FA	Bye		1:31.48	3rd place, bronze medalist(s)
Augustus Cook; Nathan Humberston; Cole Jones; Sean Talbert	K-4 500 m	—N/a				1:23.10	3rd place, bronze medalist(s)

Women

Athlete	Event	Heat		Semifinal		Final	
Athlete	Event	Time	Rank	Time	Rank	Time	Rank
Andreea Ghizila	C-1 200 m	47.63	2 FA	Bye		46.94	4
Andreea Ghizila; Azusa Murphy	C-2 500 m	—N/a				2:02.60	4
Kali Wilding	K-1 500 m	1:57.28	2 FA	Bye		1:57.64	6
Katriana Swetish; Elena Wolgamot	K-2 500 m	1:51.94	3 SF	1:51.15	2 FA	1:48.23	6
Mehanaokalaikapomaikai Leafchild; Emma McDonald; Kali Wilding; Elena Wolgamot	K-4 500 m	—N/a				1:40.14	5

== Cycling ==
The United States qualified a total of 28 cyclists (12 men and 16 women).

=== BMX ===
The United States qualified four cyclists (two men and two women) in BMX race through the UCI World Rankings.

Freestyle

Athlete	Event	Seeding		Final	
Athlete	Event	Points	Rank	Points	Rank
Nick Bruce	Men's	78.67	2 Q	25.00	8
Hannah Roberts	Women's	65.67	1 Q	81.67	1st place, gold medalist(s)

Racing

Athlete	Event	Ranking round		Quarterfinal		Semifinal		Final	
Athlete	Event	Time	Rank	Points	Rank	Points	Rank	Time	Rank
Kamren Larsen	Men's	32.650	4 Q	5	2 Q	8	2 Q	31.810	1st place, gold medalist(s)
Cameron Wood	Men's	31.800	1 Q	7	1 Q	3	1 Q	31.860	2nd place, silver medalist(s)
Payton Ridenour	Women's	35.730	2 Q	4	1 Q	4	1 Q	39.800	5
Daleny Vaughn	Women's	36.180	5 Q	5	2 Q	8	2 Q	41.800	7

=== Mountain biking ===
The United States qualified 2 female athletes at the 2023 Pan American Championships. However, neither of them competed.

=== Road ===
The United States qualified 2 female cyclists at the Pan American Championships.

Athlete	Event	Time	Rank
Kristen Faulkner	Women's road race	2:53:35	6
Lauren Stephens	Women's road race	2:51:05	1st place, gold medalist(s)
Kristen Faulkner	Women's road time trial	25:45.38	1st place, gold medalist(s)
Lauren Stephens	Women's road time trial	26:27.51	4

=== Track ===
The United States qualified a team of 18 track cyclists (nine men and nine women).

Sprint

Athlete	Event	Qualification		Round of 16	Repechage 1	Quarterfinal	Semifinal	Cl.	Final	
Athlete	Event	Time	Rank	Opposition Time	Opposition Time	Opposition Result	Opposition Result	Rank	Opposition Result	Rank
Jamie Alvord III	Men's individual	10.147	14	Did not advance						
Evan Boone	Men's individual	10.308	16	Did not advance						
Jamie Alvord III; Josh Hartman; Dalton Walters	Men's team	44.636	4 FB	—N/a					Bronze medal final Mexico; L 44.229–44.037	4
Kayla Hankins	Women's individual	11.037	4 Q	Barbosa (BRA); W 11.608	Bye	Marquardt (USA); L	Did not advance	3	Did not advance	7
Mandy Marquardt	Women's individual	11.156	5 Q	Cardozo (COL); W 11.661	Bye	Hankins (USA); W 11.552 / 11.571	Bayona (COL); L	Bye	Bronze medal final Barbosa (BRA); W 11.746 / 12.155	3rd place, bronze medalist(s)
Keely Ainslie; Kayla Hankins; Mandy Marquardt	Women's team	48.650	2 FG	—N/a					Mexico; L 48.836–48.498	2nd place, silver medalist(s)

Pursuit

Athlete	Event	Qualification		Semifinals	Finals	
Athlete	Event	Time	Rank	Opposition Result	Opposition Result	Rank
David Domonoske; Grant Koontz; Colby Lange; Brendan Rhim	Men's team	4:01.589	3 Q	Colombia; L 3:58.586–3:57.990	Bronze medal final Mexico; W 3:59.993–4:00.454	3rd place, bronze medalist(s)
Olivia Cummins; Colleen Gulick; Chloe Patrick; Shayna Powless; Elizabeth Stevenson	Women's team	4:34.125	4 Q	Canada; L 4:26.425–4:22.246	Bronze medal final Colombia; L 4:27.139–4:24.964	4

Keirin

Athlete	Event	Heats	Final
Athlete	Event	Rank	Rank
Evan Boone	Men's	5 FB	8
Mandy Marquardt	Women's	3 FA	5

Madison

Athlete	Event	Points	Rank
Grant Koontz; Colby Lange	Men's	43	3rd place, bronze medalist(s)
Colleen Gulick; Chloe Patrick	Women's	30	3rd place, bronze medalist(s)

Omnium

Athlete	Event	Scratch race	Tempo race		Elimination race	Points race		Total	
Athlete	Event	Rank	Points	Rank	Rank	Points	Rank	Points	Rank
Anders Johnson	Men's	8	37	1	7	16	5	110	6
Colleen Gulick	Women's	3	1	5	5	4	6	104	7

== Diving ==
The United States has qualified 10 divers (5 male and 5 female) through the 2022 FINA World Aquatics Championships and a further male diver through the 2021 Junior Pan American Games.

Men

Athlete	Event	Preliminary		Final	
Athlete	Event	Score	Rank	Score	Rank
Jack Ryan	1 m springboard	341.65	6 Q	339.50	7
Lyle Yost	1 m springboard	382.65	1 Q	365.35	4
Tyler Downs	3 m springboard	371.55	8 Q	384.40	6
Jack Ryan	3 m springboard	406.40	5 Q	435.35	3rd place, bronze medalist(s)
Max Flory	10 m platform	324.95	13	Did not advance	
Jordan Rzepka	10 m platform	363.75	8 Q	391.05	9
Tyler Downs; Jack Ryan	3 m synchronized springboard	—N/a		368.64	3rd place, bronze medalist(s)
Max Flory; Jordan Rzepka	10 m synchronized platform	—N/a		360.96	4

Women

Athlete	Event	Preliminary		Final	
Athlete	Event	Score	Rank	Score	Rank
Hailey Hernandez	1 m springboard	248.35	5 Q	261.75	3rd place, bronze medalist(s)
Joslyn Oakley	1 m springboard	213.25	11 Q	240.95	5
Hailey Hernandez	3 m springboard	306.60	3 Q	321.40	4
Krysta Palmer	3 m springboard	312.60	2 Q	323.85	3rd place, bronze medalist(s)
Nike Agunbiade	10 m platform	298.50	7 Q	260.10	10
Jordan Skilken	10 m platform	264.45	9 Q	277.80	6
Hailey Hernandez; Krysta Palmer	3 m synchronized springboard	—N/a		279.06	3rd place, bronze medalist(s)
Nike Agunbiade; Jordan Skilken	10 m synchronized platform	—N/a		DNS	

== Equestrian ==
The United States qualified a full team of four riders in dressage, eventing and show-jumping based on FEI world rankings released on September 11, 2023.

=== Dressage ===
Athlete	Horse	Event	Prix St. Georges		Grand Prix Special			Grand Prix Freestyle	
Athlete	Horse	Event	Score	Rank	Score	Total	Rank	Score	Rank
Codi Harrison	Katholt's Bossco	Individual	73.305	7	71.957	—N/a	11	79.230	6
Anna Marek	Fire Fly	Individual	74.891	4	74.489	—N/a	7	81.305	3rd place, bronze medalist(s)
Christian Simonson	Son of A Lady	Individual	73.382	6	74.971	—N/a	4	—N/a	
Sarah Tubman	First Apple	Individual	76.065	2	76.872	—N/a	3	81.155	4
Codi Harrison; Anna Marek; Christian Simonson; Sarah Tubman	See above	Team	224.338	1	226.332	450.670	1st place, gold medalist(s)	—N/a	

=== Eventing ===
Athlete	Horse	Event	Dressage	Cross-country	Jumping	Total	Rank
Sydney Elliott	QC Diamantaire	Individual	33.3	0	9.2	42.5	8
Liz Halliday	Miks Master C	Individual	24.8	4	13.6	42.4	7
Caroline Pamukcu	HSH Blake	Individual	26.8	0	4	30.8	1st place, gold medalist(s)
Sharon White	Claus 63	Individual	28.2	2.4	16.4	47	10
Sydney Elliott; Liz Halliday; Caroline Pamukcu; Sharon White	See above	Team	—N/a			115.7	2nd place, silver medalist(s)

=== Jumping ===
Athlete	Horse	Event	Qualification								Final					
Athlete	Horse	Event	Round 1		Round 2 A		Round 2 B		Total		Round 1		Round 2		Total	
Athlete	Horse	Event	Time penalties	Rank	Penalties	Rank	Penalties	Rank	Penalties	Rank	Penalties	Rank	Penalties	Rank	Penalties	Rank
Karl Cook	Caracole de la Roque	Individual	19.28	43	12	28	0	=1	31.28	27	Did not advance					
Kent Farrington	Landon	Individual	5.64	25	0	=1	0	=1	5.64	8 Q	4	=4	0	1	9.64	2nd place, silver medalist(s)
Laura Kraut	Dorado 212	Individual	3.39	10	0	=1	0	=1	3.39	2 Q	4	=4	8	=11	15.39	4
McLain Ward	Contagious	Individual	3.34	9	0	=1	0	=1	3.34	1 Q	8	=10	4	=2	15.34	3rd place, bronze medalist(s)
Karl Cook; Kent Farrington; Laura Kraut; McLain Ward	See above	Team	12.37	5	0	=1	0	=1	12.37	1st place, gold medalist(s)	—N/a					

== Fencing ==
The United States qualified a full team of 15 fencers (nine men and six women), after all five teams finished at least in the top seven at the 2022 Pan American Fencing Championships in Ascuncion, Paraguay.

Men

Athlete	Event	Pool Round		Round of 16	Quarterfinal	Semifinal	Final	
Athlete	Event	Victories	Seed	Opposition Score	Opposition Score	Opposition Score	Opposition Score	Rank
Miles Chamley-Watson	Foil	5V–0D	1 Q	Padua (PUR); W 15–11	Broszus (CAN); W 15–12	Toldo (BRA); W 15–9	Itkin (USA); L 6–15	2nd place, silver medalist(s)
Nick Itkin	Foil	5V–0D	1 Q	Ospina (COL); W 15–3	Archilei (MEX); W 15–7	Servello (ARG); W 15–4	Watson (USA); W 15–6	1st place, gold medalist(s)
Miles Chamley-Watson; Nick Itkin; Gerek Meinhardt	Team foil	—N/a			Venezuela; W 45–21	Chile; W 45–17	Canada; W 45–19	1st place, gold medalist(s)
Samuel Imrek	Épée	3V–2D	8 Q	Lazzarotto (BRA); L 14–15	Did not advance			
Curtis McDowald	Épée	4V–2D	7 Q	R Limardo (VEN); W 14–12	F Limardo (VEN); L 13–15	Did not advance		
Samuel Imrek; Samuel Larsen; Curtis McDowald	Team épée	—N/a			Colombia; W 45–41	Venezuela; W 45–41	Canada; W 42–41	1st place, gold medalist(s)
Andrew Doddo	Sabre	4V–2D	3 Q	Correa (COL); W 15–12	Quintero (VEN); W 15–9	Gordon (CAN); W 15–8	Romero (VEN); W 15–11	1st place, gold medalist(s)
Filip Dolegiewicz	Sabre	4V–1D	2 Q	Romero (VEN); L 10–15	Did not advance			
Josef Cohen; Andrew Doddo; Filip Dolegiewicz	Team sabre	—N/a			Argentina; W 45–31	Venezuela; W 45–27	Canada; L 38–45	2nd place, silver medalist(s)

Women

Athlete	Event	Pool Round		Round of 16	Quarterfinals	Semifinal	Final	
Athlete	Event	Victories	Seed	Opposition Score	Opposition Score	Opposition Score	Opposition Score	Rank
Jackie Dubrovich	Foil	5V–0D	3 Q	Gonzalez (ARG); W 15–9	Guo (CAN); L 8–15	Did not advance		
Lee Kiefer	Foil	5V–0D	2 Q	Gil (PER); W 15–6	Michel (MEX); W 15–8	Guo (CAN); W 15–8	Harvey (CAN); W 15–6	1st place, gold medalist(s)
Jackie Dubrovich; Lee Kiefer; Zander Rhodes	Team foil	—N/a			Peru; W 45–15	Brazil; W 45–15	Canada; W 44–33	1st place, gold medalist(s)
Maia Chamberlain	Sabre	5V–0D	1 Q	Perroni (ARG); W 15–8	Botello (MEX); W 15–8	Toledo (MEX); W 15–7	Skarbonkiewica (USA); L 13–15	2nd place, silver medalist(s)
Magda Skarbonkiewicz	Sabre	4V–1D	2 Q	Cabezas (CHI); W 15–7	Brind'amour (CAN); W15–6	Veranes (CUB); W 15–14	Chamberlain (USA); W 15–13	1st place, gold medalist(s)
Alexis Anglade; Maia Chamberlain; Magda Skarbonkiewicz	Team sabre	—N/a			Chile; W 45–11	Argentina; W 45–13	Canada; W 45–29	1st place, gold medalist(s)

== Field hockey ==
Summary

Team	Event	Group stage				Semifinal	Final / BM / Pl.	
Team	Event	Opposition Result	Opposition Result	Opposition Result	Rank	Opposition Result	Opposition Result	Rank
United States men's	Men's tournament	Trinidad and Tobago; W 6–1	Canada; L 1–2	Brazil; W 5–1	2 Q	Argentina; L 0–2	Bronze medal final Canada; L 2–3	4
United States women's	Women's tournament	Trinidad and Tobago; W 15–0	Argentina; L 1–5	Uruguay; W 3–0	2 Q	Chile; W 1–1 (3–1)	Argentina; L 1–2	2nd place, silver medalist(s)

=== Men's tournament ===
The United States qualified a men's team (of 16 athletes) by finishing fourth at the 2022 Pan American Cup.

Preliminary round

Pos	Team	Pld	W	D	L	GF	GA	GD	Pts	Qualification
1	Canada	3	3	0	0	8	1	+7	9	Semi-finals
2	United States	3	2	0	1	12	4	+8	6	Semi-finals
3	Brazil	3	1	0	2	3	8	−5	3	5th–8th classification
4	Trinidad and Tobago	3	0	0	3	2	12	−10	0	5th–8th classification

Source: FIH
Rules for classification: 1) points; 2) matches won; 3) goal difference; 4) goals for; 5) head-to-head result; 6) field goals for.

25 October 2023
11:30

United States	6–1	Trinidad and Tobago
A. Käppeler 2'; Harris 13'; Heldens 28'; Kokolakis 43'; Leser 50'; Quaile 51'	Report	Te. Marcano 55'

Umpires:
Gabriel Labate (ARG)
Guillermo Poblete Luna (CHI)

27 October 2023
11:30

United States	1–2	Canada
A. Käppeler 10'	Report	Van Son 28'; Johnston 41'

Umpires:
Gabriel Labate (ARG)
Ilanggo Kanabathu (MAS)

29 October 2023
17:30

Brazil	1–5	United States
Lopez 43'	Report	Kokolakis 11'; A. Käppeler 13', 28', 30', 34'

Umpires:
Tyler Klenk (CAN)
Federico Silva (ARG)

Semifinal

1 November 2023
18:00

Argentina	2–0	United States
Martínez 22'; Tarazona 34'	Report

Umpires:
Tyler Klenk (CAN)
Ilanggo Kanabathu (MAS)

Bronze medal game

3 November 2023
17:30

United States	2–3	Canada (bronze)
De Angelis 29'; A. Käppeler 54'	Report	Guraliuk 11'; Boothroyd 39'; Scholfield 51'

Umpires:
Gabriel Labate (ARG)
Federico Silva (ARG)

=== Women's tournament ===
The United States qualified a women's team (of 16 athletes) by finishing fourth at the 2022 Pan American Cup.

Roster The following 16 players were named in the United States squad, which was announced on 19 September 2023.

Head coach: (Republic of Ireland) David Passmore

No.	Pos.	Player	Date of birth (age)	Caps	Goals	Club
31	GK	Kelsey Bing	1 October 1997 (age 28)	62	0	
2	DF	Meredith Sholder	27 February 1999 (age 27)	23	0	
7	DF	Jillian Wolgemuth	28 April 1998 (age 28)	40	0	
13	DF	Ashley Hoffman	8 November 1996 (age 29)	104	19	
20	DF	Leah Crouse	22 February 2000 (age 26)	22	2	
21	DF	Alexandra Hammel	16 June 1996 (age 30)	43	1	
3	MF	Ashley Sessa	23 June 2004 (age 22)	26	5	
9	MF	Madeleine Zimmer	28 September 2001 (age 25)	28	1	
12	MF	Amanda Golini (Captain)	28 March 1995 (age 31)	127	13	
16	MF	Linnea Gonzales	15 August 1997 (age 29)	41	3	
25	MF	Karlie Kisha	25 September 1995 (age 31)	46	1	
27	MF	Emma DeBerdine	14 June 2001 (age 25)	17	0	
1	FW	Abigail Tamer	9 July 2003 (age 23)	10	2	
4	FW	Danielle Grega	2 July 1996 (age 30)	70	21	
15	FW	Sanne Caarls	16 March 1998 (age 28)	28	4	
17	FW	Elizabeth Yeager	17 June 2003 (age 23)	29	5	

Preliminary round

Pos	Team	Pld	W	D	L	GF	GA	GD	Pts	Qualification
1	Argentina	3	3	0	0	34	1	+33	9	Semi-finals
2	United States	3	2	0	1	19	5	+14	6	Semi-finals
3	Uruguay	3	1	0	2	11	11	0	3	5th–8th classification
4	Trinidad and Tobago	3	0	0	3	0	47	−47	0	5th–8th classification

Source: FIH
Rules for classification: 1) points; 2) matches won; 3) goal difference; 4) goals for; 5) head-to-head result; 6) field goals for.

26 October 2023
11:30

United States	15–0	Trinidad and Tobago
Gonzales 2', 25'; Grega 11'; Hoffman 22', 28'; Zimmer 27'; Caarls 28', 29', 59'; Tamer 41', 47', 58'; Yeager 45'; Sessa 55'; Crouse 57'	Report

Umpires:
Natalia Lodeiro (URU)
Victoria Pazos (ARG)

28 October 2023
11:30

United States	1–5	Argentina
Grega 9'	Report	Granatto 13', 44'; Thome 22'; Gorzelany 50', 60'

Umpires:
Emi Yamada (JPN)
Ana Vázquez Escalanté (MEX)

30 October 2023
17:30

Uruguay	0–3	United States
	Report	Tamer 27'; Sholder 28'; Sessa 29'

Umpires:
Megan Robertson (CAN)
Melina Illanes (ARG)

Semifinal

2 November 2023
19:45

Chile	1–1	United States
Rojas 46'	Report	Sessa 12'
Penalties
Avelli (penalty shoot-out scored); Ananías (penalty shoot-out missed); Müller (penalty shoot-out missed); Urroz (penalty shoot-out missed)	1–3	(penalty shoot-out scored) Sessa; (penalty shoot-out scored) Sessa; (penalty shoot-out scored) Tamer

Umpires:
Melina Illanes (ARG)
Megan Robertson (CAN)

Gold medal game

4 November 2023
19:45

Argentina	2–1	United States
Gorzelany 12'; Trinchinetti 51'	Report	Sessa 30'

Umpires:
Emi Yamada (JPN)
Megan Robertson (CAN)

Team details

Argentina

United States

GK	14	Clara Barberi
DF	2	Sofía Toccalino
DF	3	Agustina Gorzelany
DF	4	Valentina Raposo
DF	32	Valentina Costa Biondi
MF	5	Agostina Alonso
MF	17	Rocío Sánchez Moccia (c)
MF	22	Eugenia Trinchinetti
MF	26	Pilar Campoy
FW	10	María José Granatto	(yellow card) 56'
FW	28	Julieta Jankunas	20' (yellow card) 49'
Substitutions:
FW	11	Delfina Thome		(substituted on) 4'
MF	18	Victoria Sauze		(substituted on) 4'
MF	20	Sofía Cairó		(substituted on) 5'
DF	50	Juana Castellaro		(substituted on) 6'
Manager:
(Argentina) Fernando Ferrara

GK	31	Kelsey Bing
DF	13	Ashley Hoffman
DF	21	Alexandra Hammel
MF	16	Linnea Gonzales
MF	2	Meredith Sholder	49'
MF	3	Ashley Sessa
MF	25	Karlie Kisha
MF	12	Amanda Golini
FW	1	Abigail Tamer
FW	9	Madeleine Zimmer
FW	20	Leah Crouse
Substitutions:
FW	4	Danielle Grega		(substituted on) 4'
DF	7	Jillian Wolgemuth		(substituted on) 4'
MF	14	Sanne Caarls		(substituted on) 3'
MF	17	Elizabeth Yeager		(substituted on) 3'
MF	27	Emma DeBerdine		(substituted on) 3'
Manager:
(United States) David Passmore

== Football ==
Summary

Key:

- A.E.T – After extra time.
- P – Match decided by penalty-shootout.

Team	Event	Group Stage				Semifinal	Final / BM	
Team	Event	Opposition Score	Opposition Score	Opposition Score	Rank	Opposition Score	Opposition Score	Rank
United States men's	Men's tournament	Brazil; L 0–1	Honduras; W 2–1	Colombia; W 2–0	2 Q	Chile; L 0–1	Bronze medal final Mexico; L 1–4	4
United States women's	Women's tournament	Bolivia; W 6–0	Costa Rica; W 3–1	Argentina; W 4–0	1 Q	Chile; L 1–2	Bronze medal final Argentina; W 2–0	3rd place, bronze medalist(s)

=== Men's tournament ===
The United States qualified a men's team of 18 athletes by winning the 2022 CONCACAF U-20 Championship.

Roster Head coach: Michael Nsien

The 18-man squad was announced on 9 October 2023. Reed Baker-Whiting was also called up, but ended up being withdrawn from the final list.

No.	Pos.	Player	Date of birth (age)	Caps	Goals	Club
1	GK	Chituru Odunze	14 October 2002 (aged 21)	0	0	(United States Soccer Federation) Charlotte FC
2	DF	Mauricio Cuevas	10 February 2003 (aged 20)	0	0	(United States Soccer Federation) LA Galaxy
3	DF	Michael Wentzel	10 April 2002 (aged 21)	0	0	(United States Soccer Federation) St. Louis City
4	DF	Nico Carrera (captain)	6 May 2002 (aged 21)	0	0	(German Football Association) Holstein Kiel
5	DF	Thomas Williams	15 August 2004 (aged 19)	0	0	(United States Soccer Federation) Orlando City
6	MF	Danny Leyva	5 May 2003 (aged 20)	0	0	(United States Soccer Federation) Colorado Rapids
7	MF	Jackson Hopkins	1 July 2004 (aged 19)	0	0	(United States Soccer Federation) D.C. United
8	MF	Brooklyn Raines	11 March 2005 (aged 18)	0	0	(United States Soccer Federation) Houston Dynamo
9	MF	Theodore Ku-DiPietro	28 January 2002 (aged 21)	0	0	(United States Soccer Federation) D.C. United
10	MF	Jack Panayotou	5 June 2004 (aged 19)	0	0	(United States Soccer Federation) New England Revolution
11	FW	Tega Ikoba	14 August 2003 (aged 20)	0	0	(United States Soccer Federation) Portland Timbers
12	GK	Antonio Carrera	15 March 2004 (aged 19)	0	0	(United States Soccer Federation) FC Dallas
13	DF	Alex Freeman	9 August 2004 (aged 19)	0	0	(United States Soccer Federation) Orlando City
14	FW	Vaughn Covil	26 July 2003 (aged 20)	0	0	(The Football Association) Hull City
15	MF	Sergio Oregel	16 May 2005 (aged 18)	0	0	(United States Soccer Federation) Chicago Fire
16	DF	Nolan Norris	17 February 2005 (aged 18)	0	0	(United States Soccer Federation) FC Dallas
17	FW	Rodrigo Neri	12 May 2005 (aged 18)	0	0	(Royal Spanish Football Federation) Atlético Madrid
18	MF	Javier Casas	14 May 2003 (aged 20)	0	0	(United States Soccer Federation) Chicago Fire

Group play

Pos	Team	Pld	W	D	L	GF	GA	GD	Pts	Qualification
1	Brazil	3	3	0	0	6	0	+6	9	Semi-finals
2	United States	3	2	0	1	4	2	+2	6	Semi-finals
3	Colombia	3	1	0	2	2	4	−2	3	Fifth place match
4	Honduras	3	0	0	3	1	7	−6	0	Seventh place match

Source: Santiago2023
23 October 2023
18:00

Brazil	1–0	United States
Miranda 86'	Report

Estadio Elías Figueroa Brander, Valparaíso
Referee: José Matos Uzcategui (Venezuela)

26 October 2023
15:00

United States	2–1	Honduras
Leyva 72'; Ku-DiPietro 90'	Report	García 19'

Estadio Sausalito, Viña del Mar
Referee: Manuel Vergara (Chile)

29 October 2023
18:00

Colombia	0–2	United States
	Report	Ikoba 63'; Neri 76'

Estadio Elías Figueroa Brander, Valparaíso
Referee: Fernando Véjar Diaz (Chile)

Semifinal

1 November 2023
17:00

Chile	1–0	United States
Pérez 57'	Report

Estadio Elías Figueroa Brander, Valparaíso
Referee: Juan López (Paraguay)

Bronze medal game

4 November 2023
15:00

United States	1–4	Mexico
Ikoba 23'	Report	Carrillo 42', 72'; Fulgencio 50'; Ávila 88'

Estadio Sausalito, Viña del Mar
Referee: Fernando Véjar Diaz (Chile)

=== Women's tournament ===
The United States qualified a women's team of 18 athletes by winning the 2022 CONCACAF W Championship.

Roster Head coach: Carrie Kveton

The squad of 18 players was announced on 9 October 2023. On 12 October, Lizzie Boamah replaced Reese Klein due to injury.

No.	Pos.	Player	Date of birth (age)	Caps	Goals	Club
1	GK	Sonoma Kasica	30 June 2006 (aged 17)	0	0	(United States Soccer Federation) Florida Premier FC
2	DF	Gisele Thompson	2 December 2005 (aged 17)	4	1	(United States Soccer Federation) Total Futbol Academy
3	DF	Aven Alvarez	14 November 2006 (aged 16)	0	0	(United States Soccer Federation) North Carolina Courage
4	DF	Lizzie Boamah	19 April 2006 (aged 17)	0	0	(United States Soccer Federation) Albion San Diego
5	DF	Nicki Fraser	25 January 2006 (aged 17)	0	0	(United States Soccer Federation) Real Colorado
6	MF	Grace Restovich	15 August 2006 (aged 17)	0	0	(United States Soccer Federation) St. Louis Scott Gallagher
7	FW	Ava McDonald	7 September 2006 (aged 17)	0	0	(United States Soccer Federation) FC Dallas
8	MF	Charlotte Kohler	18 October 2005 (aged 18)	0	0	(United States Soccer Federation) MVLA SC
9	FW	Amalia Villarreal	27 March 2006 (aged 17)	0	0	(United States Soccer Federation) Michigan Jaguars FC
10	MF	Lauren Martinho	9 October 2005 (aged 18)	4	2	(United States Soccer Federation) North Carolina Courage
11	FW	Katie Shea Collins	28 October 2005 (aged 17)	0	0	(United States Soccer Federation) Tennessee SC
12	GK	Kealey Titmuss	15 September 2006 (aged 17)	0	0	(United States Soccer Federation) Nationals
13	DF	Sammy Smith	22 September 2005 (aged 18)	0	0	(United States Soccer Federation) Boise Timbers Thorns FC
14	MF	Claire Hutton (captain)	11 January 2006 (aged 17)	0	0	(United States Soccer Federation) World Class FC
15	MF	Kendall Bodak	21 March 2006 (aged 17)	0	0	(United States Soccer Federation) New England FC
16	FW	Emeri Adames	3 April 2006 (aged 17)	0	0	(United States Soccer Federation) Solar SC
17	MF	Eleanor Klinger	4 November 2006 (aged 16)	0	0	(United States Soccer Federation) Internationals SC
18	DF	Jordyn Bugg	11 August 2006 (aged 17)	0	0	(United States Soccer Federation) San Diego Surf SC

Preliminary round

Pos	Team	Pld	W	D	L	GF	GA	GD	Pts	Qualification
1	United States	3	3	0	0	13	1	+12	9	Semi-finals
2	Argentina	3	1	1	1	3	4	−1	4	Semi-finals
3	Costa Rica	3	0	2	1	1	3	−2	2	Fifth place match
4	Bolivia	3	0	1	2	0	9	−9	1	Seventh place match

Source: Santiago2023
Rules for classification: Tie-breakers
22 October 2023
15:00

United States	6–0	Bolivia
McDonald 4', 22', 68'; Villarreal 19', 58'; Adames 33'	Report

Estadio Sausalito, Viña del Mar
Referee: Stefani Escobar (Venezuela)

25 October 2023
13:00

United States	3–1	Costa Rica
Collins 10'; Hutton 72'; Adames 76'	Report	Fonseca 34'

Estadio Elías Figueroa Brander, Valparaíso
Referee: Maria Belen Lupera Reto (Ecuador)

28 October 2023
13:00

United States	4–0	Argentina
Bodak 15'; Kohler 20'; Villarreal 50'; Restovich 54'	Report

Estadio Elías Figueroa Brander, Valparaíso
Referee: Andreza De Siqueira (Brazil)

Semifinal

31 October 2023
20:00

Chile	2–1	United States
Araya 37'; Aedo 45' (pen.)	Report	Adames 52'

Estadio Sausalito, Viña del Mar
Referee: Andreza De Siqueira (Brazil)

Bronze medal game

3 November 2023
13:00

Argentina	0–2	United States
	Report	Villarreal 30'; Hutton 37'

Estadio Elías Figueroa Brander, Valparaíso
Referee: Stefani Escobar (Venezuela)

== Golf ==
The United States qualified a full team of 4 golfers.

Athlete	Event	Round 1	Round 2	Round 3	Round 4	Total		
Athlete	Event	Score	Score	Score	Score	Score	Par	Rank
Stewart Hagestad	Men's individual	71	71	70	71	283	–5	16
Dylan Menante	Men's individual	66	69	70	66	271	–17	3rd place, bronze medalist(s)
Anna Davis	Women's individual	71	74	68	75	290	+2	7
Rachel Heck	Women's individual	78	70	71	77	296	+8	14

== Gymnastics ==
=== Artistic ===
The United States qualified a team of 12 gymnasts in artistic (six men and six women) at the 2023 Pan American Games.

Men
Team final & individual qualification

Athlete	Event	Apparatus						Total	
Athlete	Event	F	PH	R	V	PB	HB	Score	Rank
Vahe Petrosyan	Individual	9.833	13.433	12.566	13.833	10.900	12.866	73.431	25
Cameron Bock	Team	13.466	13.766 Q	13.600	14.533	~~13.433~~	13.800 Q	82.598	1 Q
Stephen Nedoroscik	Team	—N/a	13.633 Q	—N/a					
Curran Phillips	Team	~~DNS~~	—N/a		14.566	14.466 Q	13.433	—N/a	
Colt Walker	Team	13.533	~~12.000~~	13.633 Q	14.500	14.366 Q	13.666 Q	81.698	4
Donnell Whittenburg	Team	14.233 Q	12.400	14.433 Q	~~14.066~~	13.833	~~13.366~~	82.331	2 Q
Total	Team	41.232	39.799	41.666	43.599	42.665	40.899	249.860	1st place, gold medalist(s)

Qualification Legend: Q = Qualified to apparatus final

Individual finals

Athlete	Event	Apparatus						Total	
Athlete	Event	F	PH	R	PB	V	HB	Score	Rank
Cameron Bock	All-around	13.200	13.700	12.766	14.300	14.266	12.466	80.698	4
Donnell Whittenburg	All-around	13.900	12.466	14.566	13.600	14.166	13.066	81.764	3rd place, bronze medalist(s)
Donnell Whittenburg	Floor	12.700	—N/a						6
Cameron Bock	Pommel horse	—N/a	13.933	—N/a					4
Stephen Nedoroscik	Pommel horse	—N/a	13.766	—N/a					5
Colt Walker	Rings	—N/a		13.666	—N/a				4
Donnell Whittenburg	Rings	—N/a		14.200	—N/a				1st place, gold medalist(s)
Curran Phillips	Parallel bars	—N/a			15.400	—N/a			1st place, gold medalist(s)
Colt Walker	Parallel bars	—N/a			14.366	—N/a			2nd place, silver medalist(s)
Cameron Bock	Horizontal bar	—N/a					13.766	—N/a	4
Colt Walker	Horizontal bar	—N/a					13.666	—N/a	5

Women
Team final & individual qualification

Athlete	Event	Apparatus				Total	
Athlete	Event	F	BB	V	UB	Score	Rank
Katelyn Jong	Uneven bars	—N/a			13.633	—N/a	
Jordan Chiles	Team	13.200	~~13.000~~	14.366 Q	14.100 Q	54.666	1 Q
Kayla DiCello	Team	13.633 Q	13.066 Q	14.066	13.800	54.565	2 Q
Kaliya Lincoln	Team	13.800 Q	13.233 Q	~~13.966~~	—N/a		
Zoe Miller	Team	—N/a			14.766 Q	—N/a	
Tiana Sumanasekera	Team	~~13.000~~	13.066	14.100	~~12.900~~	53.066	4
Total	Team	40.633	39.365	42.532	42.666	165.196	1st place, gold medalist(s)

Qualification Legend: Q = Qualified to apparatus final

Individual finals

Athlete	Event	Apparatus				Total	
Athlete	Event	F	BB	V	UB	Score	Rank
Jordan Chiles	All-around	13.533	13.466	14.300	12.700	53.999	3rd place, bronze medalist(s)
Kayla DiCello	All-around	13.733	13.200	14.133	13.633	54.699	1st place, gold medalist(s)
Kayla DiCello	Floor	13.733	—N/a				= (silver)
Kaliya Lincoln	Floor	14.233	—N/a				1st place, gold medalist(s)
Kayla DiCello	Balance beam	—N/a	13.800	—N/a			4
Kaliya Lincoln	Balance beam	—N/a	13.166	—N/a			6
Jordan Chiles	Vault	—N/a		14.150	—N/a		2nd place, silver medalist(s)
Jordan Chiles	Uneven bars	—N/a			12.400	—N/a	7
Zoe Miller	Uneven bars	—N/a			14.666	—N/a	1st place, gold medalist(s)

=== Rhythmic ===
The United States qualified seven rhythmic gymnasts at the 2023 Pan American Rhythmic Gymnastics Championships and 2023 Rhythmic Gymnastics World Championships.

Individual

Athlete	Event	Apparatus				Total	
Athlete	Event	Ball	Clubs	Hoop	Ribbon	Score	Rank
Evita Griskenas	All-around	31.950 Q	31.400 Q	32.800 Q	31.250 Q	127.400	2nd place, silver medalist(s)
Lili Mizuno	All-around	30.800 Q	31.050 Q	30.750 Q	29.250 Q	121.850	5
Evita Griskenas	Ball	31.500	—N/a				3rd place, bronze medalist(s)
Lili Mizuno	Ball	30.000	—N/a				5
Evita Griskenas	Clubs	—N/a	30.500	—N/a			3rd place, bronze medalist(s)
Lili Mizuno	Clubs	—N/a	27.350	—N/a			8
Evita Griskenas	Hoop	—N/a		31.950	—N/a		3rd place, bronze medalist(s)
Lili Mizuno	Hoop	—N/a		30.650	—N/a		4
Evita Griskenas	Ribbon	—N/a			31.000	—N/a	3rd place, bronze medalist(s)
Lili Mizuno	Ribbon	—N/a			30.700	—N/a	4

Qualification Legend: Q = Qualified to apparatus final

Group

Athlete	Event	Apparatus		Total	
Athlete	Event	5 hoops	3 ribbons + 2 balls	Score	Rank
Isabelle Connor; Gergana Petkova; Katrine Sakhnov; Karolina Saverino; Hana Starkman	All-around	31.500 Q	26.800 Q	58.300	3rd place, bronze medalist(s)
Isabelle Connor; Gergana Petkova; Katrine Sakhnov; Karolina Saverino; Hana Starkman	5 hoops	30.700	—N/a		3rd place, bronze medalist(s)
Isabelle Connor; Gergana Petkova; Katrine Sakhnov; Karolina Saverino; Hana Starkman	3 ribbons + 2 balls	—N/a	26.250	—N/a	3rd place, bronze medalist(s)

Qualification Legend: Q = Qualified to apparatus final

=== Trampoline ===
The United States qualified four gymnasts in trampoline (two men and two women) at the 2023 Pan American Championships.

Men

Athlete	Event	Qualification		Final	
Athlete	Event	Score	Rank	Score	Rank
Ruben Padilla	Individual	58.040	3 Q	29.610	6
Aliaksei Shostak	Individual	58.370	2 Q	12.140	7
Ruben Padilla; Aliaksei Shostak	Synchronized	51.180	1 Q	49.880	1st place, gold medalist(s)

Women

Athlete	Event	Qualification		Final	
Athlete	Event	Score	Rank	Score	Rank
Nicole Ahsinger	Individual	53.820	2 Q	52.870	4
Jessica Stevens	Individual	53.070	5 Q	54.990	1st place, gold medalist(s)
Nicole Ahsinger; Jessica Stevens	Synchronized	48.530	1 Q	48.190	1st place, gold medalist(s)

== Handball ==
Summary

Team	Event	Group stage				Semifinal	Final / BM / Pl.	
Team	Event	Opposition Result	Opposition Result	Opposition Result	Rank	Opposition Result	Opposition Result	Rank
United States men's	Men's tournament	Argentina; L 14–28	Cuba; W 30–28	Uruguay; W 34–30	2 Q	Brazil; L 27–40	Bronze medal final Chile; L 27–28	4

=== Men's tournament ===
The United States qualified a men's team (of 14 athletes) by winning the USA-CAN Qualifying Round.

Roster
The squad chosen for the 2023 Pan American Games in Santiago, Chile.

Head coach:

No.	Pos.	Name	Date of birth (age)	Height	App.	Goals	Club
		Benjamin Edwards					(Hungary) BFKA Veszprém
		Pál Merkovszky					(Hungary) Budai Farkasok KKUK
		Sean Corning					(Spain) CB Málaga
		Maksim Mccaulay					(Sweden) IFK Kristianstad
		Amar Amitovic					(Bosnia and Herzegovina) RK Krivaja Zavidovići
		Jonas Strömberg					(Sweden) Lugi HF
		Gary Hines					(Germany) HSV Solingen-Gräfrath
		Aboubakar Fofana					(France) Valence Handball
		Ian Hueter					(Germany) TSV Bayer Dormagen
		Carl Otterström					(Sweden) Tyresö Handboll
		Andrew Donlin					(United States) San Francisco CalHeat
		Samuel Hoddersen					(Germany) HSG Rodgau Nieder-Roden
		Domagoj Srsen					(Croatia) RK Metković
		Maximillian Binderis					(Sweden) AIK Handboll

Preliminary round

Pos	Team	Pld	W	D	L	GF	GA	GD	Pts	Qualification
1	Argentina	3	3	0	0	93	50	+43	6	Semifinals
2	United States	3	2	0	1	78	86	−8	4	Semifinals
3	Uruguay	3	1	0	2	71	95	−24	2	5–8th place semifinals
4	Cuba	3	0	0	3	72	83	−11	0	5–8th place semifinals

Source: Santiago 2023
Rules for classification: 1) points; 2) head-to-head points; 3) head-to-head goal difference; 4) head-to-head goals scored; 5) goal difference; 6) goals scored; 7) draw.

30 October 2023; 12:30	Argentina	28–14	United States	Gimnasio Polideportivo de Viña del Mar; Referees: Sosa, Lemes (URU)
30 October 2023; 12:30	F. Pizarro 5	(11–10)	Corning, Fofana 4	Gimnasio Polideportivo de Viña del Mar; Referees: Sosa, Lemes (URU)
30 October 2023; 12:30	1× (yellow card) 4× (suspension)	Report	1× (yellow card) 4× (suspension)	Gimnasio Polideportivo de Viña del Mar; Referees: Sosa, Lemes (URU)

31 October 2023; 10:00	United States	30–28	Cuba	Gimnasio Polideportivo de Viña del Mar; Referees: Correa, Conberse (ARG)
31 October 2023; 10:00	Hoddersen 13	(17–14)	Cordiés 8	Gimnasio Polideportivo de Viña del Mar; Referees: Correa, Conberse (ARG)
31 October 2023; 10:00	1× (suspension)	Report	1× (yellow card) 3× (suspension)	Gimnasio Polideportivo de Viña del Mar; Referees: Correa, Conberse (ARG)

1 November 2023; 10:00	United States	34–30	Uruguay	Gimnasio Polideportivo de Viña del Mar; Referees: Hansen, Madsen (DEN)
1 November 2023; 10:00	Fofana 6	(19–15)	Cancio 9	Gimnasio Polideportivo de Viña del Mar; Referees: Hansen, Madsen (DEN)
1 November 2023; 10:00	3× (suspension)	Report	1× (yellow card) 1× (suspension) 1× (red card)	Gimnasio Polideportivo de Viña del Mar; Referees: Hansen, Madsen (DEN)

Semifinal

3 November 2023; 17:30	Brazil	40–27	United States	Gimnasio Polideportivo de Viña del Mar; Referees: Araujo, Perdomo (URU)
3 November 2023; 17:30	Dupoux 8	(23–13)	Hoddersen 6	Gimnasio Polideportivo de Viña del Mar; Referees: Araujo, Perdomo (URU)
3 November 2023; 17:30	3× (suspension)	Report	1× (yellow card) 1× (suspension)	Gimnasio Polideportivo de Viña del Mar; Referees: Araujo, Perdomo (URU)

Bronze medal game

4 November 2023; 17:00	United States	27–28	Chile	Gimnasio Polideportivo de Viña del Mar; Referees: Conberse, Correa (ARG)
4 November 2023; 17:00	Corning 7	(13–15)	Ayala, Salinas 5	Gimnasio Polideportivo de Viña del Mar; Referees: Conberse, Correa (ARG)
4 November 2023; 17:00	1× (suspension)	Report	1× (yellow card) 1× (suspension)	Gimnasio Polideportivo de Viña del Mar; Referees: Conberse, Correa (ARG)

== Judo ==
The United States qualified 14 judokas (six men and eight women).

Men

Athlete	Event	Round of 16	Quarterfinals	Semifinals	Repechage	Final / BM	
Athlete	Event	Opposition Result	Opposition Result	Opposition Result	Opposition Result	Opposition Result	Rank
David Terao	–60 kg	Ayala (ECU); L 00–10	Did not advance				
Jack Yonezuka	–73 kg	Falcão (BRA); L DNS	Did not advance				
Kell Berliner	–81 kg	Popovici (CAN); L 00–10	Did not advance				
Alexander Knauf	−90 kg	Bye	Florentino (DOM); L 00–11	Did not advance	Paez (VEN); W 10–00	Bronze medal final Coto (ARG); W 10–00	3rd place, bronze medalist(s)
Geronimo Saucedo	−90 kg	Bye	Silva (CUB); L 00–10	Did not advance	Paz (COL); L 00–01	Did not advance	
Nathanial Keeve	–100 kg	Dargoltz (ARG); W 10–00	El Nahas (CAN); L 00–10	Did not advance	Cardona (CUB); L 00–10	Did not advance	
Philip Horiuchi	+100 kg	Cruz (CUB); L 00–11	Did not advance				

Women

Athlete	Event	Round of 16	Quarterfinals	Semifinals	Repechage	Final / BM	
Athlete	Event	Opposition Result	Opposition Result	Opposition Result	Opposition Result	Opposition Result	Rank
Maria Laborde	−48 kg	Solís (EAI); W 01–00	Carrillo (MEX); L 00–10	Did not advance	Pena (ECU); W 11–00	Bronze medal final Lasso (COL); W 10–01	3rd place, bronze medalist(s)
Angelica Delgado	−52 kg	Bye	Lahiton (ARG); W 10–00	Pimenta (BRA); L 00–10	Bye	Bronze medal final Echevarría (PUR); W 10–00	3rd place, bronze medalist(s)
Tasha Cancela	−57 kg	Segura (CHI); W 10–00	Rosa (DOM); L 00–10	Did not advance	Ortiz (MEX); W 10–00	Bronze medal final Villalba (COL); L 00–10	=5
Mariah Holguin	−57 kg	Jiménez (PAN); L 00–01	Did not advance				
Sara Golden	−63 kg	Sanchez (DOM); W 10–01	Quadros (BRA); L 00–10	Did not advance	Awiti (MEX); L 00–01	Did not advance	
Yasmin Alamin	−70 kg	de Carvalho (BRA); L 00–10	Did not advance				
Mackenzie Williams	+78 kg	Bye	Carabalí (COL); L 00–10	Did not advance	Marenco (NCA); L 00–11	Did not advance	

== Karate ==
The United States qualified a team of 13 karatekas (seven men and six women) at the 2021 Junior Pan American Games, the 2023 North American Cup and the 2023 Pan American Championships.

Kumite

Men

Athlete	Event	Round robin					Semifinal	Final	
Athlete	Event	Opposition Result	Opposition Result	Opposition Result	Opposition Result	Rank	Opposition Result	Opposition Result	Rank
Frank Ruiz	−60 kg	Brose (BRA); L 0–3	De La Roca (EAI); W 4–3	Fernández (COL); L 0–3	—N/a	3	Did not advance		
Joseph Tolentino	−60 kg	Villalón (CHI); L 1–2	Díaz (CUB); L 0–1	Luque (MEX); W 3–1	Larrosa (URU); W 3–2	=2	Did not advance		
Safin Kasturi	−75 kg	Rodríguez (CHI); L 3–6	Landázuri (COL); L 0–5	Sobrinho (BRA); L 1–3	Maldonado (EAI); L 3–8	5	Did not advance		
Thomas Scott	−75 kg	O'Neil (CAN); W 3–2	Barrios (URU); W 8–0	Villarreal (MEX); T 0–0	—N/a	2 Q	Maldonado (EAI); W 8–5	Villarreal (MEX); W 3–2	1st place, gold medalist(s)
Saisheren Senpon	−84 kg	Merino (ESA); L 0–3	Greer (PUR); W 3–2	Huaiquiman (CHI); W 5–2	Ramirez (EAI); T 0–0	2 Q	Henao (COL); L 2–7	Did not advance	3rd place, bronze medalist(s)
Brian Irr	+84 kg	Rojas (CHI); L 0–2	Castillo (DOM); W 5–2	Molina (ARG); W 10–3	Miranda (BRA); T 1–1	3	Did not advance		

Women

Athlete	Event	Round robin					Semifinal	Final	
Athlete	Event	Opposition Result	Opposition Result	Opposition Result	Opposition Result	Rank	Opposition Result	Opposition Result	Rank
Doralvis Delgado Lopez	−50 kg	Izaguirre (ESA); W 3–1	de la Cruz (PER); L 0–1	Morales (EAI); L 0–2	Benitez (ARG); L 0–1	4	Did not advance		
Trinity Allen	−55 kg	Torres (CUB); T 0–0	Luque (MEX); W 7–0	Fernandes (BRA); T 4–4	—N/a	3	Did not advance		
Alexandra Wainwright	−61 kg	Huaiquimán (CHI); L 2–4	Grande (PER); L 0–2	Fonseca (PUR); L 0–8	—N/a	4	Did not advance		
Skylar Lingl	−68 kg	Mosquera (COL); L 2–5	Cabrera (PER); W 1–1	Velozo (CHI); W 8–0	—N/a	2 Q	Rodrigues (BRA); L 1–3	Did not advance	3rd place, bronze medalist(s)
Kelara Madani	+68 kg	Nolet (CAN); W 2–0	Quintal (MEX); L 1–6	Echever (ECU); L 3–6	—N/a	3	Did not advance		

Kata

Athlete	Event	Round robin				Final / BM	
Athlete	Event	Opposition Result	Opposition Result	Opposition Result	Rank	Opposition Result	Rank
Ariel Torres	Men's individual	Impagnatiello (ARG); W 41.60–39.50	Aracena (DOM); W 41.50–39.20	Tepal (MEX); W 41.80–38.00	1 FG	Leocadio (VEN); W 42.60–40.10	1st place, gold medalist(s)
Sakura Kokumai	Women's individual	Gallo (CHI); W 40.30–37.80	Dimitrova (DOM); W WO	Yonamine (BRA); W 41.30–39.70	1 FG	Zapata (COL); W 41.10–39.40	1st place, gold medalist(s)

== Modern pentathlon ==
The United States qualified five modern pentathletes (two men and three women).

Men

Athlete	Event	Fencing ranking round (Épée one touch)			Semifinal									Final												
Athlete	Event	Fencing ranking round (Épée one touch)			Fencing	Swimming (200 m freestyle)			Shooting / Running (10 m laser pistol / 3000 m cross-country)			Total		Fencing	Swimming			Riding (Show jumping)				Shooting / Running			Total	
Athlete	Event	V – D	Rank	MP points	BP	Time	Rank	MP points	Time	Rank	MP points	MP points	Rank	BP	Time	Rank	MP points	Time	Faults	Rank	MP points	Time	Rank	MP points	MP points	Rank
Brendan Anderson	Individual	16–14	14	220	0	2:11.96	5	287	10:57.50	6	643	1150	6 Q	0	2:13.67	10	283	57.00	21	11	279	10:12.90	4	688	1470	7
Tristen Bell	Individual	15–15	16	214	2	2:15.62	9	279	11:02.60	4	638	1133	4 Q	6	2:17.17	14	276	51.00	7	5	293	10:55.30	12	645	1434	11
Brendan Anderson; Tristen Bell	Relay	21–19	5	222	—N/a									0	2:01.07	7	308	1:57.00	17	1	283	11:56.70	4	584	1397	2nd place, silver medalist(s)

Women

Athlete	Event	Fencing ranking round (Épée one touch)			Semifinal									Final												
Athlete	Event	Fencing ranking round (Épée one touch)			Fencing	Swimming (200 m freestyle)			Shooting / Running (10 m laser pistol / 3000 m cross-country)			Total		Fencing	Swimming			Riding (Show jumping)				Shooting / Running			Total	
Athlete	Event	V – D	Rank	MP points	BP	Time	Rank	MP points	Time	Rank	MP points	MP points	Rank	BP	Time	Rank	MP points	Time	Faults	Rank	MP points	Time	Rank	MP points	MP points	Rank
Jessica Davis	Individual	20–12	5	238	0	2:30.68	5	249	12:38.70	3	542	1029	3 Q	0	2:30.24	7	250	0:52.00	21	10	279	11:37.70	5	603	1370	4
Phaelen French	Individual	21–11	4	244	4	2:38.96	12	233	12:38.00	6	542	1023	6 Q	0	2:41.54	15	227	1:13.00	0	8	287	11:55.40	7	585	1343	7
Heidi Hendrick	Individual	15–17	21	208	0	2:20.89	1	269	13:21.80	11	499	976	10	Did not advance												
Jessica Davis; Heidi Hendrick	Relay	15–21	7	200	—N/a									4	2:15.55	3	279	EL			0	14:20.80	6	440	923	7

Mixed

Athlete	Event	Fencing (Épée one touch)				Swimming (200 m freestyle)			Riding (Show jumping)				Shooting / Running (10 m laser pistol / 3000 m cross-country)			Total	
Athlete	Event	V – D	Rank	MP points	BP	Time	Rank	MP points	Time	Faults	Rank	MP points	Time	Rank	MP points	MP points	Rank
Brendan Anderson; Jessica Davis	Relay	23–21	6	218	0	2:08.39	8	294	2:04.00	14	2	282	12:46.10	2	534	1328	3rd place, bronze medalist(s)

== Racquetball ==
The United States qualified five racquetball athletes (three men and two women).

Men

Athlete	Event	Round of 32	Round of 16	Quarterfinal	Semifinal	Final	
Athlete	Event	Opposition Result	Opposition Result	Opposition Result	Opposition Result	Opposition Result	Rank
Daniel De La Rosa	Singles	Bye	Kurzbard (ARG); W 11–1, 11–2, 11–5	Portillo (MEX); L 12–10, 11–13, 10–12, 11–9, 11–13	Did not advance		
Adam Manilla	Singles	Bye	García (ARG); W 11–6, 4–11, 11–6, 5–11, 11–8	Montoya (MEX); L 4–11, 11–2, 4–11, 11–5, 11–4	Did not advance		
Daniel De La Rosa; Alejandro Landa	Doubles	—N/a	Bye	Iwaasa / Murray (CAN); L 11–4, 11–8, 8–11, 8–11, 4–11	Did not advance		
Daniel De La Rosa; Alejandro Landa; Adam Manilla	Team	—N/a	Bye	Ecuador; W 3–1, 3–0	Bolivia; L 0–3, 3–2, 2–3	Did not advance	3rd place, bronze medalist(s)

Women

Athlete	Event	Round of 32	Round of 16	Quarterfinal	Semifinal	Final	
Athlete	Event	Opposition Result	Opposition Result	Opposition Result	Opposition Result	Opposition Result	Rank
Michelle Key	Singles	Ferrer (CUB); W 11–7, 11–0, 11–3	Barrios (BOL); L 7–11, 3–11, 6–11	Did not advance			
Erika Manilla	Singles	Larduet (CUB); W 11–3, 11–3, 11–3	Sabja (BOL); W 8–11, 11–9, 11–4, 11–6	Longoria (MEX); L 3–11, 5–11, 9–11	Did not advance		
Michelle Key; Erika Manilla	Doubles	—N/a	Bye	Méndez / Vargas (ARG); L 12–10, 9–11, 5–11, 10–12	Did not advance		
Michelle Key; Erika Manilla	Team	—N/a	Bye	Bolivia; W 3–2, 3–0	Mexico; L 0–3, 1–3	Did not advance	3rd place, bronze medalist(s)

Mixed

Athlete	Event	Round of 16	Quarterfinal	Semifinal	Final / BM	
Athlete	Event	Opposition Result	Opposition Result	Opposition Result	Opposition Result	Rank
Adam Manilla; Erika Manilla	Doubles	Bye	Galicia / Martínez (EAI); W 11–9, 11–13, 11–6, 8–11, 11–9	Longoria / Portillo (MEX); W 11–9, 13–11, 6–11, 8–11, 11–7	García / Vargas (ARG); W 11–4, 11–4, 11–6	1st place, gold medalist(s)

== Roller sports ==
=== Artistic ===
The United States qualified a team of two athletes in artistic skating (one man and one woman).

Athlete	Event	Short program		Long program		Total	
Athlete	Event	Score	Rank	Score	Rank	Score	Rank
Collin Motley	Men's	52.97	5	81.11	5	134.08	5
Samantha Krusza	Women's	40.48	5	57.75	7	98.23	6

=== Speed ===
Men

Athlete	Event	Qualification		Semifinal		Final	
Athlete	Event	Time	Rank	Time	Rank	Time	Rank
Jacob Anderson	200 m time trial	—N/a				18.478	9
Jacob Anderson	500 m + distance	44.117	9	Did not advance			
Matthew Fortner	1000 m sprint	1:25.163	9 q	—N/a		1:24.856	5
Matthew Fortner	10,000 m elimination	—N/a				EL	

Women

Athlete	Event	Qualification		Semifinal		Final	
Athlete	Event	Time	Rank	Time	Rank	Time	Rank
Erin Jackson	200 m time trial	—N/a				18.909	3rd place, bronze medalist(s)
Erin Jackson	500 m + distance	46.643	6 Q	45.838	2 Q	45.518	1st place, gold medalist(s)
Darian O'Neil	1000 m sprint	1:35.506	10	—N/a		Did not advance	
Darian O'Neil	10,000 m elimination	—N/a				EL	

=== Skateboarding ===
The United States qualified a team of four athletes (two men and two women) in skateboarding.

Athlete	Event	Score	Rank
Taylor Nye	Men's park	86.68	1st place, gold medalist(s)
Dashawn Jordan	Men's street	DNS	
Bryce Wettstein	Women's park	79.95	3rd place, bronze medalist(s)
Payge Heyn	Women's street	176.35	3rd place, bronze medalist(s)

== Rowing ==
The United States qualified a team of 21 athletes (ten men and eleven women).

Men

Athlete	Event	Heat		Repechage		Semifinal		Final A/B	
Athlete	Event	Time	Rank	Time	Rank	Time	Rank	Time	Rank
Jacob Plihal	Single sculls	7:21.53	1 SA/B	Bye		7:07.41	4 FA	6:59.93	2nd place, silver medalist(s)
Ezra Carlson; Alexander Hedge	Pair	6:55.19	1 FA	Bye		—N/a		6:35.16	1st place, gold medalist(s)
Casey Fuller; Luke Rein	Double sculls	6:43.30	2 SA/B	Bye		6:32.77	1 FA	6:26.70	3rd place, bronze medalist(s)
Sean Richardson; Alex Twist	Lightweight double sculls	6:37.01	2 FA	Bye		—N/a		6:34.06	6
Ezra Carlson; Alexander Hedge; Cooper Hurley; Nicholas Ruggiero	Four	—N/a						6:12.32	5
Mark Couwenhoven; Casey Fuller; Cooper Hurley; Luke Rein	Quadruple sculls	—N/a						6:01.36	4
Ezra Carlson; Mark Couwenhoven; Casey Fuller; Alexander Hedge; Cooper Hurley; Colette Lucas-Conwell; Jacob Plihal; Luke Rein; Nicholas Ruggiero	Eight	—N/a						5:47.48	4

Women

Athlete	Event	Heat		Repechage		Semifinal		Final A/B	
Athlete	Event	Time	Rank	Time	Rank	Time	Rank	Time	Rank
Grace Joyce	Single sculls	8:16.05	1 SA/B	Bye		7:48.65	3 FA	7:51.69	4
Isabela Darvin; Hannah Paynter	Pair	7:30.39	1 FA	Bye		—N/a		7:15.85	1st place, gold medalist(s)
Madeleine Focht; Veronica Nicacio	Double sculls	7:26.38	2 FA	Bye		—N/a		7:02.11	1st place, gold medalist(s)
Elizabeth Martin; Mary Wilson	Lightweight double sculls	7:17.32	1 FA	Bye		—N/a		7:14.54	2nd place, silver medalist(s)
Isabela Darvin; Lauren Miller; Hannah Paynter; Cristina Pretto	Four	—N/a						6:44.41	2nd place, silver medalist(s)
Madeleine Focht; Katherine Horvat; Grace Joyce; Veronica Nicacio	Quadruple sculls	—N/a						6:26.04	1st place, gold medalist(s)
Isabela Darvin; Madeleine Focht; Katherine Horvat; Grace Joyce; Colette Lucas-Conwell; Lauren Miller; Veronica Nicacio; Hanah Paynter; Cristina Pretto	Eight	—N/a						6:14.17	2nd place, silver medalist(s)

Mixed

Athlete	Event	Heat		Repechage		Final A/B	
Athlete	Event	Time	Rank	Time	Rank	Time	Rank
Ezra Carlson; Isabela Darvin; Alexander Hedge; Jacob Plihal; Colette Lucas-Conwell; Lauren Miller; Mark Couwenhoven; Hannah Paynter; Cristina Pretto	Eight	5:58.51	2 R	5:54.79	1 FA	5:54.26	1st place, gold medalist(s)

Qualification Legend: FA=Final A (medal); FB=Final B (non-medal); SA/B=Semifinals A/B; R=Repechage

== Rugby sevens ==
Summary

Team	Event	Group stage				Semifinal	Final / BM / Pl.	
Team	Event	Opposition Result	Opposition Result	Opposition Result	Rank	Opposition Result	Opposition Result	Rank
United States men's	Men's tournament	Mexico; W 48–7	Brazil; W 17–5	Canada; W 19–5	1 Q	Chile; L 12–15	Bronze medal final Canada; L 17–19	4
United States women's	Women's tournament	Jamaica; W 44–0	Colombia; W 33–0	Paraguay; W 39–0	1 Q	Brazil; W 36–0	Canada; W 19–12	1st place, gold medalist(s)

=== Men's tournament ===
The United States men's team is automatically qualified to the Pan American Games.

Pool stage

Pos	Team	Pld	W	D	L	PF	PA	PD	Pts	Qualification
1	United States	3	3	0	0	84	17	+67	9	Semifinals
2	Canada	3	2	0	1	69	36	+33	7	Semifinals
3	Brazil	3	1	0	2	46	39	+7	5	5–8th place semifinals
4	Mexico	3	0	0	3	12	119	−107	3	5–8th place semifinals

Source: Santiago 2023
Rules for classification: 1) Points; 2) Head-to-head result; 3) Point difference; 4) Points scored; 5) draw.

3 November 2023
11:40

United States	48–7	Mexico
Try: Lacamp (2) 0', 0'; Hardirct II (3) 3', 3', 2'; Wendling 4'; Williams (2) 3', 9'; Con: Walsh (2/4) 2', 1', 2'; Hardrict II (1/1) 3'; Wendling 4'; Lacamp (1/1) 3'	Report	Try: Rodríguez Porras 3'; Con: Rodríguez Ramos (1/1) 7'

Estadio Municipal de La Pintana
Referee: Cauã Santos (Brazil)

3 November 2023
16:40

United States	17–5	Brazil
Try: Wendling 6'; Vi 1'; Hardrict 3'; Con: Lacamp (1/3) 1'	Report	Try: Silveira 4'

Estadio Municipal de La Pintana
Referee: Talal-Azmat Chaudhry (Canada)

3 November 2023
20:00

United States	19–5	Canada
Try: Vi (2) 1', 3'; Wendling 6'; Con: Lacamp (1/2) 1'; Walsh (1/1) 3'	Report	Try: McDougall 1'

Estadio Municipal de La Pintana
Referee: Gonzalo de Achaval (Argentina)

Semifinal

4 November 2023
12:30

Chile	15–12	United States
Try: Warnken (2) 3', 5'; Game 7'	Report	Try: Santos 3'; Bizer 7'; Con: Walsh (1/2) 3'

Estadio Municipal de La Pintana
Referee: Gonzalo de Achaval (Argentina)

Bronze medal match

4 November 2023
17:10

Canada	19–17	United States
Try: Richard 3'; Thier 1'; Russell 3'; Con: Kratz (2/3) 3', 3'	Report	Try: Thomas 5'; Williams 2'; Vi 6'; Con: Lacamp (1/3) 3'

Estadio Municipal de La Pintana
Referee: Cauã Santos (Brazil)

=== Women's tournament ===
The United States women's team is automatically qualified to the Pan American Games.

Pool stage

Pos	Team	Pld	W	D	L	PF	PA	PD	Pts	Qualification
1	United States	3	3	0	0	116	0	+116	9	Semifinals
2	Colombia	3	2	0	1	58	54	+4	7	Semifinals
3	Jamaica	3	1	0	2	38	91	−53	5	5–8th place semifinals
4	Paraguay	3	0	0	3	28	95	−67	3	5–8th place semifinals

Source: Santiago 2023
Rules for classification: 1) Points; 2) Head-to-head result; 3) Point difference; 4) Points scored; 5) draw.

3 November 2023
10:00

United States	44–0	Jamaica
Try: Tapper (2) 1', 3'; Sedrick 2'; Olsen 4'; Sullivan (3) 2', 6', 7'; Ramsey 4'; Con: Heavirland (2/7) 6'	Report

Estadio Municipal de La Pintana
Referee: Nerea Livoni (Argentina)

3 November 2023
15:00

United States	33–0	Colombia
Try: Empa 1'; Tapper (2) 5', 2'; Heavirland 6'; Sullivan 8'; Con: Heavirland (3/3) 6', 6', 8'; Olsen (1/1) 2'	Report

Estadio Municipal de La Pintana
Referee: Frank Méndez (Chile)

3 November 2023
18:20

United States	39–0	Paraguay
Try: Rovetti 0'; Ramsey (3) 2', 1', 4'; Sullivan 3'; Tapper 2'; Sedrick 6'; Con: Sedrick (1/1) 1'; Heavirland (1/3) 6'	Report

Estadio Municipal de La Pintana
Referee: Kristine Lovatt (Canada)

Semifinal

4 November 2023
12:05

United States	36–0	Brazil
Try: Sedrick 1'; Kirshe 3'; Maker 5'; Rovetti 4'; Sullivan 7'; Con: Olsen (2/4) 1', 5'; Heavirland (1/2) 7'	Report

Estadio Municipal de La Pintana
Referee: Talal-Ahmat Chaudhry (Canada)

Gold medal match

4 November 2023
17:40

United States	19–12	Canada
Try: Kirshe 9'; Sedrick 4'; Tapper 6'; Con: Olsen (2/3) 10', 5'	Report	Try: Logan (2) 3', 0'; Con: Williams (1/1) 1'

Estadio Municipal de La Pintana
Referee: Nerea Livoni (Argentina)

== Sailing ==
The United States has qualified 13 boats for a total of 19 sailors.

Men

Athlete	Event	Opening series																		Finals				
Athlete	Event	1	2	3	4	5	6	7	8	9	10	11	12	13	14	15	16	Points	Rank	QF	SF	M / F	Points	Rank
Noah Lyons	IQFoil	3	3	2	3	2 STP	3	1	2	(4)	1	4	(5)	(11); UFD	4	1	2	31	2 Q	Bye	2 Q	3	—N/a	3rd place, bronze medalist(s)
Markus Edegran	Kite	(10); DSQ	2	2	1	4	2	3	(7)	3	5	4	2	2	3	(10); DSQ	2	35	3 Q	—N/a		4	—N/a	4
Chapman Petersen	Laser	11	11	11	8	11	11	2	11	(14)	13	—N/a						89	13	—N/a		Did not advance		
Conner Blouin	Sunfish	5	7	(8)	7	7	5	3	1	3	3	—N/a						41	5 Q	—N/a		5	51	5
Ian Barrows; Hans Henken	49er	4	1	3	2	1	1	3	1	(7)	2	3	3	—N/a				24	1 Q	—N/a		1	26	1st place, gold medalist(s)

Women

Athlete	Event	Opening series																		Finals				
Athlete	Event	1	2	3	4	5	6	7	8	9	10	11	12	13	14	15	16	Points	Rank	QF	SF	M / F	Points	Rank
Dominique Stater	IQFoil	(4)	3	3	(4)	3	(4)	3	3	3	1	4	2	3	2	3	3	36	2 Q	Bye	1 Q	2	—N/a	2nd place, silver medalist(s)
Daniela Moroz	Kite	1	3	(8); DNF	(8); DNF	1	1	1	1	1	1	1	1	(8); UFD	1	1	1	15	1 Q	—N/a		1	—N/a	1st place, gold medalist(s)
Erika Reineke	Laser Radial	2	1	1	1	1	2	1	1	1	(4)	—N/a						11	1 Q	—N/a		1	13	1st place, gold medalist(s)
Amanda Callahan	Sunfish	8	(10)	5	8	7	4	7	7	9	7	—N/a						62	8	—N/a		Did not advance		
Stephanie Roble; Maggie Shea	49erFX	2	2	2	1	2	3	2	3	1	2	(4)	2	—N/a				22	=2 Q	—N/a		3	28	3rd place, bronze medalist(s)

Mixed

Athlete	Event	Race													Total	
Athlete	Event	1	2	3	4	5	6	7	8	9	10	11	12	M	Points	Rank
Ernesto Rodriguez; Kathleen Tocke	Snipe	2	4	(9); OCS	6	1	5	5	2	1	2	—N/a		1	30	2nd place, silver medalist(s)
Madeline Baldridge; Sarah Chin; Allan Terhune, Jr.	Lightning	2	1	2	1	1	2	1	(3)	1	1	—N/a		1	14	1st place, gold medalist(s)
David Liebenberg; Sarah Newberry Moore	Nacra 17	(3)	3	2	2	2	2	2	3	2	2	3	3	2	30	2nd place, silver medalist(s)

== Shooting ==
The United States qualified a total of 22 shooters after the 2022 Americas Shooting Championships. The United States also qualified three shooters by winning the events in the 2021 Junior Pan American Games.

Men

Athlete	Event	Qualification		Final	
Athlete	Event	Points	Rank	Points	Rank
James Hall	10 m air pistol	569	7 Q	239.3	2nd place, silver medalist(s)
Nick Mowrer	10 m air pistol	572	4 Q	175.5	5
Henry Leverett	25 m rapid fire pistol	575	2 Q	23	3rd place, bronze medalist(s)
Keith Sanderson	25 m rapid fire pistol	573	4 Q	9	6
Gavin Barnick	10 m air rifle	624.6	4 Q	183.5	5
Rylan Kissel	10 m air rifle	626.5	2 Q	245.4	2nd place, silver medalist(s)
Timothy Sherry	10 m air rifle	617.0	10	Did not advance	
Lucas Kozeniesky	50 m rifle three positions	588	2 Q	438.8	3rd place, bronze medalist(s)
Tim Sherry	50 m rifle three positions	590	1 Q	449.5	2nd place, silver medalist(s)
William Hinton	Men's trap	114	8	Did not advance	
Derrick Mein	Men's trap	116	5 Q	22	5
Vincent Hancock	Men's skeet	125	1 Q	57 FPR	1st place, gold medalist(s)
Dustan Taylor	Men's skeet	115	10	Did not advance	

Women

Athlete	Event	Qualification		Final	
Athlete	Event	Points	Rank	Points	Rank
Lisa Emmert	10 m air pistol	571	5 Q	173.7	5
Alexis Lagan	10 m air pistol	570	7 Q	231.5	2nd place, silver medalist(s)
Suman Sanghera	10 m air pistol	578 QPR	1 Q	153.6	6
Lisa Emmert	25 m pistol	579	1 Q	22	4
Alexis Lagan	25 m pistol	571	6 Q	24	3rd place, bronze medalist(s)
Sagen Maddalena	10 m air rifle	631.9 QPR	1 Q	249.5 FPR	1st place, gold medalist(s)
Mary Tucker	10 m air rifle	630.2	2 Q	226.3	3rd place, bronze medalist(s)
Alison Weisz	10 m air rifle	625.9	3 Q	205.6	4
Sagen Maddalena	50 m rifle three positions	596	1 Q	457.2	2nd place, silver medalist(s)
Mary Tucker	50 m rifle three positions	590	2 Q	458.4 FPR	1st place, gold medalist(s)
Alicia Gough	Women's trap	110	5 Q	23	4
Rachel Tozier	Women's trap	115	1 Q	28	3rd place, bronze medalist(s)
Austen Smith	Women's skeet	DNS		Did not advance	
Dania Vizzi	Women's skeet	119	3 Q	29	4

Mixed

Athlete	Event	Qualification		Final / BM	
Athlete	Event	Points	Rank	Opposition Result	Rank
Nick Mowrer; Lisa Emmert	10 m air pistol team	571	3 QB	Bronze medal final Wu / Breide (BRA); W 16–0	3rd place, bronze medalist(s)
James Hall; Alexis Lagan	10 m air pistol team	566	7	Did not advance	
Rylan Kissel; Mary Tucker	10 m air rifle team	630.1	1 QG	Ramírez / Zumaya (MEX); W 16–10	1st place, gold medalist(s)
Gavin Barnick; Sagen Maddalena	10 m air rifle team	621.8	4 QB	Bronze medal final Quedaza / Marquez (MEX); W 16–6	3rd place, bronze medalist(s)
Vincent Hancock; Dania Vizzi	Skeet team	144	1 QG	Gallardo / Rodríguez (MEX); W 41–39	1st place, gold medalist(s)
Dustan Taylor; Austen Smith	Skeet team	142	3 QB	Bronze medal final Flores / Crovetto (CHI); W 37–36	3rd place, bronze medalist(s)

== Softball ==
The United States qualified a women's team (of 18 athletes) by winning the 2021 Junior Pan American Games.

Summary

Team	Event	Opening round				Super round			Final / BM / Pl.	
Team	Event	Opposition Result	Opposition Result	Opposition Result	Rank	Opposition Result	Opposition Result	Rank	Opposition Result	Rank
United States women's	Women's tournament	Chile; W 18–0	Venezuela; W 9–2	Mexico; W 7–0	1 Q	Puerto Rico; W 11–3	Canada; W 8–3	1 Q	Puerto Rico; W 7–0	1st place, gold medalist(s)

Opening round

Pos	Team	Pld	W	L	RF	RA	PCT	GB	Qualification
1	United States	3	3	0	34	2	1.000	—	Super Round
2	Mexico	3	2	1	17	9	.667	1	Super Round
3	Venezuela	3	1	2	17	18	.333	2	Fifth place game
4	Chile (H)	3	0	3	0	39	.000	3	Seventh place game

Source: Santiago 2023 and WBSC Americas
(H) Hosts

October 29; 16:00	Chile	0–18 (F/3)	United States	Baseball and Softball Center, Santiago
October 29; 16:00		Boxscore		Baseball and Softball Center, Santiago

October 30; 13:00	United States	9–2 (F/6)	Venezuela	Baseball and Softball Center, Santiago
October 30; 13:00		Boxscore		Baseball and Softball Center, Santiago

November 1; 13:00	Mexico	0–7 (F/5)	United States	Baseball and Softball Center, Santiago
November 1; 13:00		Boxscore		Baseball and Softball Center, Santiago

Super round

Pos	Team	Pld	W	L	RF	RA	PCT	GB	Qualification
1	United States	3	3	0	26	6	1.000	—	Gold medal game
2	Puerto Rico	3	2	1	7	13	.667	1	Gold medal game
3	Canada	3	1	2	11	12	.333	2	Bronze medal game
4	Mexico	3	0	3	1	14	.000	3	Bronze medal game

Source: Santiago 2023 and WBSC Americas

November 3; 10:00	Puerto Rico	3–11 (F/6)	United States	Baseball and Softball Center, Santiago
November 3; 10:00		Boxscore		Baseball and Softball Center, Santiago

November 3; 13:00	Canada	3–8	United States	Baseball and Softball Center, Santiago
November 3; 13:00		Boxscore		Baseball and Softball Center, Santiago

Gold medal game

November 4; 13:00	(silver) Puerto Rico	0–7 (F/6)	United States (gold)	Baseball and Softball Center, Santiago
November 4; 13:00		Boxscore		Baseball and Softball Center, Santiago

== Sport climbing ==
The United States qualified a full team of 12 climbers (six men and six women) by virtue of their IFSC world rankings.

Boulder & lead

Athlete	Event	Qualification						Final					
Athlete	Event	Bouldering		Lead		Total		Bouldering		Lead		Total	
Athlete	Event	Points	Rank	Points	Rank	Points	Rank	Points	Rank	Points	Rank	Points	Rank
Sean Bailey	Men's	84.2	4	80	2	164.2	2 Q	84.5	=1	57.1	2	141.6	2nd place, silver medalist(s)
Zach Galla	Men's	79.7	6	54.1	=4	133.8	5 Q	84.4	3	54.1	3	138.5	3rd place, bronze medalist(s)
Jesse Grupper	Men's	99.8	1	92.1	1	191.9	1 Q	69.4	4	92.1	1	161.5	1st place, gold medalist(s)
Natalia Grossman	Women's	99.8	2	76.1	=1	175.9	2 Q	84.3	1	88.1	2	172.4	1st place, gold medalist(s)
Brooke Raboutou	Women's	99.9	1	76.1	=1	176.0	1 Q	69.4	2	96.0	1	165.4	2nd place, silver medalist(s)
Annie Sanders	Women's	85.0	4	30.1	=5	115.1	4 Q	39.0	4	76.1	3	115.1	4

Speed

Athlete	Event	Qualification			Round of 16	Quarterfinal	Semifinal	Final / BM	
Athlete	Event	Lane A	Lane B	Rank	Opposition Result	Opposition Result	Opposition Result	Opposition Result	Rank
Noah Bratschi	Men's	~~6.58~~	6.56	11 Q	Perez (VEN); W 5.48–10.27	Egg (BRA); W 5.47–7.04	Granja (ECU); W 5.37–FALL	Watson (USA); L 5.96–5.37	2nd place, silver medalist(s)
John Brosler	Men's	~~5.70~~	5.69	3 Q	Egg (BRA); L 7.67–7.35	Did not advance			
Sam Watson	Men's	~~6.44~~	5.38	1 Q	Flores (EAI); W 5.55–10.61	Estevez (ECU); W 5.05–5.68	Flynn-Pitcher (CAN); W 5.32–FALL	Bratschi (USA); W 5.37–5.96	1st place, gold medalist(s)
Sophia Curcio	Women's	~~7.79~~	7.76	2 Q	—N/a	Velve (CAN); W 7.83–8.41	Kelly (USA); L 9.67–7.69	Bronze medal final Rojas (ECU); L FALL–7.59	4
Emma Hunt	Women's	6.82	~~6.84~~	1 Q	—N/a	Contreras (CHI); W 6.76–9.30	Rojas (ECU); W 6.71–7.74	Kelly (USA); L FS–7.52	2nd place, silver medalist(s)
Piper Kelly	Women's	~~10.82~~	7.97	3 Q	—N/a	Riveros (CHI); W 6.71–8.57	Curcio (USA); W 7.69–9.67	Hunt (USA); W 7.52–FS	1st place, gold medalist(s)

== Squash ==
The United States qualified a full team of seven athletes (three men and four women) through the 2023 Pan American Squash Championships and the 2021 Junior Pan American Games.

Men

Athlete	Event	Round of 16	Quarterfinal	Semifinal	Final	
Athlete	Event	Opposition Result	Opposition Result	Opposition Result	Opposition Result	Rank
Timothy Brownell	Singles	Crowne (CAN); W 3–0	C Salazar (MEX); L 0–3	Did not advance		
Todd Harrity	Singles	Vargas (COL); L 0–3	Did not advance			
Todd Harrity; Shahjahan Khan	Doubles	—N/a	Palomino / Vargas (COL); L 0–2	Did not advance		
Timmy Brownell; Todd Harrity; Shahjahan Khan	Team	—N/a	Canada; L 0–2	5th-8th semifinal Chile; W 2–0	5th place final Mexico; W 2–1	5

Women

Athlete	Event	Round of 32	Round of 16	Quarterfinal	Semifinal	Final	
Athlete	Event	Opposition Result	Opposition Result	Opposition Result	Opposition Result	Opposition Result	Rank
Olivia Fiechter	Singles	Bye	Pinto (CHI); W 3–0	Moya (ECU); W 3–0	Naughton (CAN); W 3–1	Sobhy (USA); W 3–2	1st place, gold medalist(s)
Amanda Sobhy	Singles	Bye	Prow (BAR); W 3–0	Dominguez (MEX); W 3–0	Stefanoni (USA); W 3–0	Fiechter (USA); L 2–3	2nd place, silver medalist(s)
Marina Stefanoni	Singles	Bye	Bonilla (EAI); W 3–0	Bunyan (CAN); W 3–2	Sobhy (USA); L 0–3	Did not advance	3rd place, bronze medalist(s)
Olivia Fiechter; Amanda Sobhy	Doubles	—N/a		Buenaño / Moya (ECU); W 2–0	Delgado / Pinto (CHI); W 2–0	Bautista / Tovar (COL); L 1–2	2nd place, silver medalist(s)
Olivia Clyne; Olivia Fiechter; Amanda Sobhy	Team	—N/a		Independent Athletes Team; W 2–0	Barbados; W 2–0	Canada; W 2–0	1st place, gold medalist(s)

Mixed

Athlete	Event	Quarterfinal	Semifinal	Final / BM	
Athlete	Event	Opposition Result	Opposition Result	Opposition Result	Rank
Timothy Brownell; Olivia Clyne	Doubles	García / Salazar (MEX); W 2–1	Peláez / Rodríguez (COL); W 2–1	Crowne / Bunyan (CAN); W 2–1	1st place, gold medalist(s)

== Surfing ==
The United States qualified four surfers (three men and one woman).

Artistic

Athlete	Event	Round 1		Round 2		Round 3	Round 4	Repechage 1	Repechage 2	Repechage 3	Repechage 4	BM	Final	
Athlete	Event	Score	Rank	Score	Rank	Opposition Result	Opposition Result	Opposition Result	Opposition Result	Opposition Result	Opposition Result	Opposition Result	Opposition Result	Rank
Cole Robbins	Men's longboard	10.70	1 Q	3.26	3 R	Did not advance		Bye	Cedeño (PAN); W 10.33–7.30	Cortéz (CHI); L 7.17–8.50	Did not advance			
Zane Schweitzer	Men's stand up paddleboard	11.80	1 Q	11.30	1 Q	Torres (PUR); W 15.07–7.20	Diniz (BRA); W 13.13–11.30	Bye					Diniz (BRA); W 16.00–10.23	1st place, gold medalist(s)

Race

Athlete	Event	Time	Rank
Connor Baxter	Men's stand up paddleboard	12:49.9	1st place, gold medalist(s)
Candice Appleby	Women's stand up paddleboard	15:24.9	1st place, gold medalist(s)

== Swimming ==
The United States qualified a full team of 36 swimmers in the pool events and a further four swimmers for the open water events.

Men

Athlete	Event	Heat		Final	
Athlete	Event	Time	Rank	Time	Rank
David Curtiss	50 m freestyle	22.10	2 Q	21.85	1st place, gold medalist(s)
Jonny Kulow	50 m freestyle	21.90	1 Q	21.90	2nd place, silver medalist(s)
Brooks Curry	100 m freestyle	48.65	4 Q	48.38	= (silver)
Jonny Kulow	100 m freestyle	48.49	1 Q	48.38	= (silver)
Coby Carrozza	200 m freestyle	1:49.10	5 Q	1:47.37	1st place, gold medalist(s)
Zane Grothe	200 m freestyle	1:48.17	4 Q	1:48.00	8
Jay Litherland	400 m freestyle	3:55.00	2 Q	3:52.72	4
James Plage	400 m freestyle	3:55.90	6 Q	3:50.74	3rd place, bronze medalist(s)
Will Gallant	800 m freestyle	—N/a		7:58.96	3rd place, bronze medalist(s)
James Plage	800 m freestyle	—N/a		8:10.73	8
Will Gallant	1500 m freestyle	—N/a		15:12.94	2nd place, silver medalist(s)
Adam Chaney	100 m backstroke	54.71	2 Q	54.20	1st place, gold medalist(s)
Christopher O'Connor	100 m backstroke	54.96	4 Q	54.61	5
Jack Aikins	200 m backstroke	1:59.28	2 Q	1:56.58 PR	1st place, gold medalist(s)
Ian Grum	200 m backstroke	1:59.21	1 Q	1:57.19	2nd place, silver medalist(s)
Jacob Foster	100 m breaststroke	1:00.85	1 Q	59.99	1st place, gold medalist(s)
Noah Nichols	100 m breaststroke	1:01.10	3 Q	1:00.43	2nd place, silver medalist(s)
Jacob Foster	200 m breaststroke	2:13.25	1 Q	2:10.71	1st place, gold medalist(s)
Noah Nichols	200 m breaststroke	2:16.05	6 Q	2:14.23	5
Arsenio Bustos	100 m butterfly	53.21	5 Q	52.60	3rd place, bronze medalist(s)
Lukas Miller	100 m butterfly	51.99	1 Q	51.98	1st place, gold medalist(s)
Jack Dahlgren	200 m butterfly	1:58.51	2 Q	1:57.53	3rd place, bronze medalist(s)
Mason Laur	200 m butterfly	1:57.58	1 Q	1:56.44	1st place, gold medalist(s)
Arsenio Bustos	200 m individual medley	2:02.77	6 Q	1:59.89	2nd place, silver medalist(s)
Mason Laur	200 m individual medley	2:02.41	2 Q	2:02.22	7
Ian Grum	400 m individual medley	4:22.35	3 Q	4:18.78	4
Jay Litherland	400 m individual medley	4:21.48	1 Q	4:15.44	1st place, gold medalist(s)
Jack Aikins; Coby Carrozza*; Adam Chaney; Brooks Curry; Jonny Kulow; Lukas Miller*	4 × 100 m freestyle relay	3:16.57	2 Q	3:14.22	2nd place, silver medalist(s)
Coby Carrozza; Brooks Curry; Jack Dahlgren; Zane Grothe; Mason Laur*; Lukas Miller*; Christopher O'Connor*; James Plage*	4 × 200 m freestyle relay	7:32.57	4 Q	7:08.06	2nd place, silver medalist(s)
Jack Aikins; Coby Carrozza*; Jack Dahlgren*; Jacob Foster; Jonny Kulow; Lukas Miller; Noah Nichols*; Christopher O'Connor*	4 × 100 m medley relay	3:37.19	1 Q	3:33.29	1st place, gold medalist(s)
Brennan Gravley	10 km open water	—N/a		1:50:23.4	1st place, gold medalist(s)
Dylan Gravley	10 km open water	—N/a		1:50:26.8	4

Women

Athlete	Event	Heat		Final	
Athlete	Event	Time	Rank	Time	Rank
Gabi Albiero	50 m freestyle	25.03	2 Q	24.84	= (gold)
Catie DeLoof	50 m freestyle	24.79	1 Q	24.88	3rd place, bronze medalist(s)
Catie DeLoof	100 m freestyle	55.52	4 Q	54.50	3rd place, bronze medalist(s)
Amy Fulmer	100 m freestyle	54.78	1 Q	54.90	5
Camille Spink	200 m freestyle	1:59.94	2 Q	1:58.61	3rd place, bronze medalist(s)
Kayla Wilson	200 m freestyle	2:01.34	5 Q	1:58.91	5
Paige Madden	400 m freestyle	4:14.42	3 Q	4:06.45 PR	1st place, gold medalist(s)
Rachel Stege	400 m freestyle	4:14.60	4 Q	4:06.94	4
Paige Madden	800 m freestyle	—N/a		8:27.99	1st place, gold medalist(s)
Rachel Stege	800 m freestyle	—N/a		8:28.50	2nd place, silver medalist(s)
Rachel Stege	1500 m freestyle	—N/a		16:13.59 PR	1st place, gold medalist(s)
Erica Sullivan	1500 m freestyle	—N/a		16:41.21	6
Josephine Fuller	100 m backstroke	1:00.17	1 Q	59.67	1st place, gold medalist(s)
Kennedy Noble	100 m backstroke	1:00.29	2 Q	59.84	2nd place, silver medalist(s)
Kennedy Noble	200 m backstroke	2:13.54	1 Q	2:08.03 PR	1st place, gold medalist(s)
Reilly Tiltmann	200 m backstroke	2:15.49	4 Q	2:12.79	2nd place, silver medalist(s)
Anna Keating	100 m breaststroke	1:11.42	14 q	1:11.73	15
Emma Weber	100 m breaststroke	1:09.00	5 Q	1:08.13	5
Anna Keating	200 m breaststroke	2:30.66	5 Q	2:31.14	7
Emma Weber	200 m breaststroke	2:31.79	7 Q	2:31.01	6
Olivia Bray	100 m butterfly	58.84	2 Q	58.36	3rd place, bronze medalist(s)
Kelly Pash	100 m butterfly	58.34	1 Q	57.85	2nd place, silver medalist(s)
Dakota Luther	200 m butterfly	2:10.78	2 Q	2:09.27	1st place, gold medalist(s)
Kelly Pash	200 m butterfly	2:10.68	1 Q	2:10.30	3rd place, bronze medalist(s)
Abby Harter	200 m individual medley	2:16.81	4 Q	2:17.95	6
Kennedy Noble	200 m individual medley	2:15.23	2 Q	2:14.19	3rd place, bronze medalist(s)
Lucerne Bell	400 m individual medley	4:49.68	1 Q	4:44.27	2nd place, silver medalist(s)
Gabi Albiero; Olivia Bray*; Catie DeLoof; Amy Fulmer; Camile Spink*; Reilly Tiltmann*; Kayla Wilson	4 × 100 m freestyle relay	3:42.87	2 Q	3:38.42	2nd place, silver medalist(s)
Olivia Bray*; Amy Fulmer*; Paige Madden; Kelly Pash; Camille Spink; Rachel Stege*; Kayla Wilson	4 × 200 m freestyle relay	8:07.40	2 Q	7:55.26	1st place, gold medalist(s)
Gabi Albiero*; Olivia Bray*; Catie DeLoof; Josephine Fuller; Anna Keating*; Kelly Pash; Reilly Tiltmann*; Emma Weber	4 × 100 m medley relay	4:06.43	2 Q	3:59.39	2nd place, silver medalist(s)
Leah DeGeorge	10 km open water	—N/a		1:58:54.7	5
Ashley Twichell	10 km open water	—N/a		1:57:16.4	1st place, gold medalist(s)

Mixed

Athlete	Event	Heat		Final	
Athlete	Event	Time	Rank	Time	Rank
Gabi Albiero*; Brooks Curry; Jack Dahlgren*; Catie DeLoof; Amy Fulmer; Jonny Kulow; Paige Madden*	4 × 100 m freestyle relay	3:28.96	1 Q	3:24.21	2nd place, silver medalist(s)
Jack Aikins*; Olivia Bray*; Arsenio Bustos*; Jacob Foster; Jonny Kulow; Kennedy Noble; Kelly Pash; Kayla Wilson*	4 × 100 m medley relay	3:51.75	1 Q	3:44.71 PR	1st place, gold medalist(s)

Qualification legend: Q – Qualify to the medal final; q – Qualify to the non-medal final

* – Indicates that the athlete swam in the heat but not the final

== Table tennis ==
The United States qualified a full team of six athletes (three men and three women) through the 2022 ITTF Pan American Championships and the 2023 ITTF Pan American Championships.

Men

Athlete	Event	Group stage			Round of 32	Round of 16	Quarterfinal	Semifinal	Final	
Athlete	Event	Opposition Result	Opposition Result	Rank	Opposition Result	Opposition Result	Opposition Result	Opposition Result	Opposition Result	Rank
Jishan Liang	Singles	—N/a			Montes (COL); W 4–0	Lorenzo (ARG); L 1–4	Did not advance			
Nandan Naresh	Singles	—N/a			Aguirre (PAR); L 2–4	Did not advance				
Jishan Liang; Nandan Naresh	Doubles	—N/a				Campos / Periera (CUB); L 0–4	Did not advance			
Jishan Liang; Nandan Naresh; Siddhartha Naresh	Team	Mexico; W 3–2	Cuba; W 3–2	1 Q	—N/a		Peru; W 3–1	Canada; L 2–3	Did not advance	3rd place, bronze medalist(s)

Women

Athlete	Event	Group stage			Round of 32	Round of 16	Quarterfinal	Semifinal	Final	
Athlete	Event	Opposition Result	Opposition Result	Rank	Opposition Result	Opposition Result	Opposition Result	Opposition Result	Opposition Result	Rank
Amy Wang	Singles	—N/a			Castro (DOM); W 4–1	Vega (CHI); W 4–0	Zhang (CAN); L 0–4	Did not advance		
Lily Zhang	Singles	—N/a			Ovelar (PAR); W 4–0	Zeng (CHI); W 4–0	Cossio (MEX); W 4–1	B Takahashi (BRA); L 0–4	Did not advance	3rd place, bronze medalist(s)
Rachel Sung; Amy Wang	Doubles	—N/a				Bye	Gonzalez / Obando (VEN); W 4–0	Ortega / Vega (CHI); W 4–2	B Takahashi / G Takahashi (BRA); W 4–3	1st place, gold medalist(s)
Rachel Sung; Amy Wang; Lily Zhang	Team	Independent Athletes Team; W 3–0	Argentina; W 3–1	1 Q	—N/a		Cuba; W 3–0	Brazil; W 3–0	Puerto Rico; W 3–1	1st place, gold medalist(s)

Mixed

Athlete	Event	Round of 16	Quarterfinal	Semifinal	Final	
Athlete	Event	Opposition Result	Opposition Result	Opposition Result	Opposition Result	Rank
Jishan Liang; Lily Zhang	Doubles	Ortiz / Wu (DOM); W 4–0	Ishiy / B Takahashi (BRA); L 1–4	Did not advance		

== Taekwondo ==
The United States qualified three athletes at Kyorugi events, by virtue of their titles in the 2021 Junior Pan American Games. The United States also qualified 10 athletes (five men and five women) during the Pan American Games Qualification Tournament.

Kyorugi

Men

Athlete	Event	Round of 16	Quarterfinals	Semifinals	Repechage	Final/ BM	
Athlete	Event	Opposition Result	Opposition Result	Opposition Result	Opposition Result	Opposition Result	Rank
Gavin Grant	–58 kg	Granado (VEN); L 0–2	Did not advance				
Khalfani Harris	–68 kg	Gomez (MEX); W 2–0	Fernández (CUB); W 2–0	Paz (COL); W 2–0	Bye	Pié (DOM); W 2–0	1st place, gold medalist(s)
Carl Nickolas	–80 kg	—N/a	Ostapiv (BRA); W 2–0	Rodriguez (USA); W 2–0	Bye	Trejos (COL); W 2–0	1st place, gold medalist(s)
Michael C. Rodriguez	–80 kg	Flores (CRC); W 2–0	Churchill (CHI); W 2–1	Nickolas (USA); L 0–2	Bye	Bronze medal final Calderón (CUB); L 1–2	=4
Jonathan Healy	+80 kg	Bye	Soto (COL); W 2–0	Alves (ARG); W 2–0	—N/a	Sansores (MEX); L 1–2	2nd place, silver medalist(s)
Dallas Parker	+80 kg	Soto (COL); L 0–2	Did not advance		—N/a	Did not advance	

Women

Athlete	Event	Round of 16	Quarterfinals	Semifinals	Repechage	Final / BM	
Athlete	Event	Opposition Result	Opposition Result	Opposition Result	Opposition Result	Opposition Result	Rank
Melina Daniel	–49 kg	Suarez (PER); W 2–0	Souza (MEX); L 0–2	Did not advance	—N/a	Bronze medal final Grippoli (URU); W 2–0	3rd place, bronze medalist(s)
Caitlyn Cox	–57 kg	Mejia (DOM); W 1–0	Park (CAN); L 0–2	Did not advance	—N/a	Bronze medal final Villegas (MEX); W 2–0	3rd place, bronze medalist(s)
Kristina Teachout	–67 kg	Acosta (CUB); W 2–0	Soltero (MEX); L 0–2	Did not advance	Castellanos (VEN); W 2–0	Bronze medal final Santos (BRA); W WDR	3rd place, bronze medalist(s)
Madelynn Gorman-Shore	+67 kg	Bye	Folleco (ECU); W 2–0	Weekes (PUR); W 2–0	—N/a	Mosquera (COL); W 2–1	1st place, gold medalist(s)

Poomsae

Athlete	Event	Round of 16	Quarterfinals	Semifinals	Repechage	Final / BM	
Athlete	Event	Opposition Result	Opposition Result	Opposition Result	Opposition Result	Opposition Result	Rank
Anthony Do	Men's individual	Ha (CAN); W 7.430–7.300	Ortega (NCA); L 7.460–7.670	Did not advance			
Kaitlyn Reclusado	Women's individual	Bye	Jervez (ECU); W 7.530–7.280	Lee (MEX); W 7.660–7.660	Bye	Higueros (EAI); W 7.830–7.350	1st place, gold medalist(s)
Anthony Do; Kaitlyn Reclusado	Mixed pair	—N/a				7.540	6

== Tennis ==
The United States qualified a full team of six athletes (three men and three women).

Athlete	Event	Round of 64	Round of 32	Round of 16	Quarterfinal	Semifinal	Final / BM	
Athlete	Event	Opposition Result	Opposition Result	Opposition Result	Opposition Result	Opposition Result	Opposition Result	Rank
Tristan Boyer	Men's singles	Bye	Chin (JAM); W 6–3, 6–0	Escobedo (MEX); L 6–3, 6–7^{(5–7)}, 6–7^{(4–7)}	Did not advance			
Omni Kumar	Men's singles	Bye	Boulais (CAN); L 6–4, 5–7, 4–6	Did not advance				
Evan Zhu	Men's singles	Bye	Rubio (MEX); L 4–6, 3–6	Did not advance				
Omni Kumar; Evan Zhu	Men's doubles	—N/a		Bicknell / Phillips (JAM); L 4–6, 3–6	Did not advance			
Jamie Loeb	Women's singles	Bye	Clarke (BAH); W 6–3, 6–0	Seguel (CHI); W 6–2, 7–5	Pigossi (BRA); L 5–7, 6–4, 1–6	Did not advance		
Tristan Boyer; Jamie Loeb	Mixed doubles	—N/a		Pérez / Suarez (VEN); W 6–4, 6–4	Huertas del Pino / Ccuno (PER); L 4–6, 6–3, [6–10]	Did not advance		

== Triathlon ==
The United States qualified a team of four triathletes (two men and two women) after winning the 2023 Pan American Mixed Relays Championship.

Individual

Athlete	Event	Swim (1.5 km)	Trans 1	Bike (40 km)	Trans 2	Run (10 km)	Total	Rank
Matthew McElroy	Men's	18:20	0:42	55:44	0:21	31:00	1:46:09	2nd place, silver medalist(s)
Chase McQueen	Men's	17:45	0:51	55:33	0:26	34:04	1:48:40	14
Seth Rider	Men's	17:49	0:52	56:06	0:25	31:18	1:46:31	5
Erika Ackerlund	Women's	19:25	0:52	1:02:01	0:27	36:12	1:58:58	7
Virginia Sereno	Women's	19:52	0:55	1:03:25	0:31	35:39	2:00:25	12

Relay

Athlete	Event	Swim (300 m)	Trans 1	Bike (6.6 km)	Trans 2	Run (1.5 km)	Total	Rank
Erika Ackerlund	Mixed relay	4:02	0:45	9:13	0:22	5:13	19:35	—N/a
Matthew McElroy	Mixed relay	3:39	0:40	8:49	0:22	4:35	18:05	—N/a
Seth Rider	Mixed relay	3:15	0:44	8:18	0:21	4:30	17:08	—N/a
Virginia Sereno	Mixed relay	4:02	0:50	9:56	0:27	5:14	20:29	—N/a
Total	Mixed relay	—N/a					1:15:26	2nd place, silver medalist(s)

== Volleyball ==
=== Beach ===
The United States qualified four beach volleyball athletes (two men and two women).

Athlete	Event	Group stage				Round of 16	Quarterfinal	Semifinal / Cl.	Final / BM / Pl.	
Athlete	Event	Opposition Result	Opposition Result	Opposition Result	Rank	Opposition Result	Opposition Result	Opposition Result	Opposition Result	Rank
Logan Webber; Hagen Smith	Men's tournament	Calvo / Salvatierra (BOL); W (21–15, 21–15)	Garcia / Leonardo (EAI); W (21–15, 18–21, 15–10)	Hannibal / Llambías (URU); W (21–16, 19–21, 15–12)	1	Bye	Sarabia / Virgen (MEX); W (21–18, 21–15)	Alayo / Díaz (CUB); L (15–21, 13–21)	Bronze medal final E Grimalt / M Grimalt (CHI); L (14–21, 21–18, 12–15)	4
Corinne Quiggle; Sarah Schermerhorn	Women's tournament	Gaona / Allcca (PER); W (21–13, 21–18)	Alvarado / Giron (EAI); W (21–13, 21–11)	Gallay / Pereyra (ARG); W (24–22, 21–17)	1	Bye	Rivas / Vorpahl (CHI); W (21–18, 21–16)	Lisboa / Ramos (BRA); L (11–21, 18–21)	Bronze medal final Gallya / Pereyra (ARG); W (21–18, 21–10)	3rd place, bronze medalist(s)

== Water polo ==
Summary

Team	Event	Group stage				Quarterfinal	Semifinal	Final / BM / Pl.	
Team	Event	Opposition Result	Opposition Result	Opposition Result	Rank	Opposition Result	Opposition Result	Opposition Result	Rank
United States men's	Men's tournament	Mexico; W 30–2	Puerto Rico; W 28–9	Brazil; W 24–7	1 Q	Chile; W 28–2	Argentina; W 22–7	Brazil; W 17–7	1st place, gold medalist(s)
United States women's	Women's tournament	Chile; W 35–0	Puerto Rico; W 29–0	Brazil; W 25–3	1 Q	Mexico; W 32–1	Argentina; W 27–1	Canada; W 20–11	1st place, gold medalist(s)

=== Men's tournament ===
The United States automatically qualified a men's team (of 11 athletes).

Preliminary round

Pos	Team	Pld	W	PSW	PSL	L	GF	GA	GD	Pts	Qualification
1	United States	3	3	0	0	0	82	18	+64	9	Quarterfinals
2	Brazil	3	2	0	0	1	46	39	+7	6	Quarterfinals
3	Puerto Rico	3	1	0	0	2	29	58	−29	3	Quarterfinals
4	Mexico	3	0	0	0	3	24	66	−42	0	Quarterfinals

Source: Santiago 2023
Rules for classification: 1) points; 2) head-to-head points; 3) head-to-head goal difference; 4) head-to-head number of goals scored; 5) goal difference.

30 October 2023; 18:00	Report	United States	30–2	Mexico	Aquatic Center, Santiago; Referees: Xavier Villanueva (CHI); Daniel Federico Daners (URU)
30 October 2023; 18:00	Report	Score by quarters: 10–0, 7–1, 7–0, 6–1			Aquatic Center, Santiago; Referees: Xavier Villanueva (CHI); Daniel Federico Daners (URU)
30 October 2023; 18:00	Report	R. Dodd 6	Goals	Mercado, Tavera 1	Aquatic Center, Santiago; Referees: Xavier Villanueva (CHI); Daniel Federico Daners (URU)

31 October 2023; 15:00	Report	United States	28–9	Puerto Rico	Aquatic Center, Santiago; Referees: Ernesto Hernández Toledo (CUB); Daniel Federico Daners (URU)
31 October 2023; 15:00	Report	Score by quarters: 8–3, 6–1, 6–3, 8–2			Aquatic Center, Santiago; Referees: Ernesto Hernández Toledo (CUB); Daniel Federico Daners (URU)
31 October 2023; 15:00	Report	R. Dodd 7	Goals	Loubriel 3	Aquatic Center, Santiago; Referees: Ernesto Hernández Toledo (CUB); Daniel Federico Daners (URU)

1 November 2023; 15:00	Report	Brazil	7–24	United States	Aquatic Center, Santiago; Referees: Mikhail Dykman (CAN); Frank Ohme (GER)
1 November 2023; 15:00	Report	Score by quarters: 2–5, 0–8, 2–5, 3–6			Aquatic Center, Santiago; Referees: Mikhail Dykman (CAN); Frank Ohme (GER)
1 November 2023; 15:00	Report	P. Real, R. Real 2	Goals	Daube 5	Aquatic Center, Santiago; Referees: Mikhail Dykman (CAN); Frank Ohme (GER)

Quarterfinal

2 November 2023; 18:00	Report	United States	28–2	Chile	Aquatic Center, Santiago; Referees: Agustin Pinski (ARG); Teodoro de Brito (BRA)
2 November 2023; 18:00	Report	Score by quarters: 4–0, 9–0, 4–1, 11–1			Aquatic Center, Santiago; Referees: Agustin Pinski (ARG); Teodoro de Brito (BRA)
2 November 2023; 18:00	Report	R. Dodd 8	Goals	Illino, Reginato 1	Aquatic Center, Santiago; Referees: Agustin Pinski (ARG); Teodoro de Brito (BRA)

Semifinal

3 November 2023; 19:30	Report	Argentina	7–22	United States	Aquatic Center, Santiago; Referees: Gerardo Arellano Jr (MEX); Frank Ohme (GER)
3 November 2023; 19:30	Report	Score by quarters: 1–6, 0–4, 4–6, 6–6			Aquatic Center, Santiago; Referees: Gerardo Arellano Jr (MEX); Frank Ohme (GER)
3 November 2023; 19:30	Report	Galimberti 2	Goals	Irving 6	Aquatic Center, Santiago; Referees: Gerardo Arellano Jr (MEX); Frank Ohme (GER)

Gold medal game

4 November 2023; 20:30	Report	Brazil	7–17	United States	Aquatic Center, Santiago; Referees: Mikhail Dykman (CAN); Frank Ohme (GER)
4 November 2023; 20:30	Report	Score by quarters: 1–2, 2–6, 2–5, 2–4			Aquatic Center, Santiago; Referees: Mikhail Dykman (CAN); Frank Ohme (GER)
4 November 2023; 20:30	Report	three players 2	Goals	Bowen, Daube 5	Aquatic Center, Santiago; Referees: Mikhail Dykman (CAN); Frank Ohme (GER)

=== Women's tournament ===
The United States automatically qualified a women's team (of 11 athletes).

Preliminary round

Pos	Team	Pld	W	PSW	PSL	L	GF	GA	GD	Pts	Qualification
1	United States	3	3	0	0	0	89	3	+86	9	Quarterfinals
2	Brazil	3	2	0	0	1	53	34	+19	6	Quarterfinals
3	Puerto Rico	3	1	0	0	2	21	60	−39	3	Quarterfinals
4	Chile (H)	3	0	0	0	3	14	80	−66	0	Quarterfinals

Source: Santiago 2023
Rules for classification: 1) points; 2) head-to-head points; 3) head-to-head goal difference; 4) head-to-head number of goals scored; 5) goal difference.
(H) Host

30 October 2023; 12:30	Report	United States	35–0	Chile	Aquatic Center, Santiago; Referees: Jorge Rincon Patiño (COL); Ernesto Hernández Toledo (CUB)
30 October 2023; 12:30	Report	Score by quarters: 12–0, 8–0, 8–0, 7–0			Aquatic Center, Santiago; Referees: Jorge Rincon Patiño (COL); Ernesto Hernández Toledo (CUB)
30 October 2023; 12:30	Report	Flynn, Steffens 5	Goals		Aquatic Center, Santiago; Referees: Jorge Rincon Patiño (COL); Ernesto Hernández Toledo (CUB)

31 October 2023; 9:30	Report	United States	29–0	Puerto Rico	Aquatic Center, Santiago; Referees: Hélène Painchaud (CAN); Xavier Villanueva (CHI)
31 October 2023; 9:30	Report	Score by quarters: 8–0, 8–0, 7–0, 6–0			Aquatic Center, Santiago; Referees: Hélène Painchaud (CAN); Xavier Villanueva (CHI)
31 October 2023; 9:30	Report	Steffens 6	Goals		Aquatic Center, Santiago; Referees: Hélène Painchaud (CAN); Xavier Villanueva (CHI)

1 November 2023; 9:30	Report	Brazil	3–25	United States	Aquatic Center, Santiago; Referees: Gerardo Arellano Jr (MEX); Hélène Painchaud (CAN)
1 November 2023; 9:30	Report	Score by quarters: 1–4, 0–9, 0–4, 2–8			Aquatic Center, Santiago; Referees: Gerardo Arellano Jr (MEX); Hélène Painchaud (CAN)
1 November 2023; 9:30	Report	Belorio 2	Goals	Fattal 5	Aquatic Center, Santiago; Referees: Gerardo Arellano Jr (MEX); Hélène Painchaud (CAN)

Quarterfinal

2 November 2023; 12:30	Report	Mexico	1–32	United States	Aquatic Center, Santiago; Referees: Ernesto Hernández Toledo (CUB); Xavier Villanueva (CHI)
2 November 2023; 12:30	Report	Score by quarters: 1–10, 0–11, 0–6, 0–5			Aquatic Center, Santiago; Referees: Ernesto Hernández Toledo (CUB); Xavier Villanueva (CHI)
2 November 2023; 12:30	Report	Ramírez 1	Goals	Steffens 7	Aquatic Center, Santiago; Referees: Ernesto Hernández Toledo (CUB); Xavier Villanueva (CHI)

Semifinal

3 November 2023; 11:00	Report	Argentina	1–27	United States	Aquatic Center, Santiago; Referees: Xavier Villanueva (CHI); Daniel Federico Daners (URU)
3 November 2023; 11:00	Report	Score by quarters: 0–7, 0–7, 1–6, 0–7			Aquatic Center, Santiago; Referees: Xavier Villanueva (CHI); Daniel Federico Daners (URU)
3 November 2023; 11:00	Report	Leonard 1	Goals	four players 4	Aquatic Center, Santiago; Referees: Xavier Villanueva (CHI); Daniel Federico Daners (URU)

Gold medal game

4 November 2023; 12:30	Report	United States	20–11	Canada	Aquatic Center, Santiago; Referees: Jose Garcia Soto (VEN); German Moller (ARG)
4 November 2023; 12:30	Report	Score by quarters: 5–3, 5–4, 6–2, 4–2			Aquatic Center, Santiago; Referees: Jose Garcia Soto (VEN); German Moller (ARG)
4 November 2023; 12:30	Report	Fattal, Flynn 5	Goals	McKelvey 4	Aquatic Center, Santiago; Referees: Jose Garcia Soto (VEN); German Moller (ARG)

== Water skiing ==
The United States qualified two wakeboarders (one man and one woman) during the 2022 Pan American Championship.

The United States also qualified four water skiers during the 2022 Pan American Water skiing Championship.

Men

Athlete	Event	Preliminary					Final				
Athlete	Event	Slalom	Jump	Tricks	Total	Rank	Slalom	Jump	Tricks	Total	Rank
Nate Smith	Slalom	2.00 / 58 / 10.25	—N/a			1 Q	3.00 / 58 / 10.25	—N/a			1st place, gold medalist(s)
Nate Smith	Jump	—N/a	1.0	—N/a		10	—N/a	Did not advance	—N/a		Did not advance
Nate Smith	Tricks	—N/a		80	—N/a	12	—N/a		Did not advance	—N/a	Did not advance
Nate Smith	Overall	1000.00	0.00	6.63	1006.63	8	Did not advance				

Women

Athlete	Event	Preliminary					Final				
Athlete	Event	Slalom	Jump	Tricks	Total	Rank	Slalom	Jump	Tricks	Total	Rank
Anna Gay	Slalom	2.00 / 55 / 11.25	—N/a			5 Q	0.50 / 55 / 11.25	—N/a			5
Regina Jaquess	Slalom	1.00 / 55 / 10.25	—N/a			1 Q	4.00 / 55 / 10.75	—N/a			1st place, gold medalist(s)
Erika Lang	Slalom	1.00 / 55 / 11.25	—N/a			6	Did not advance	—N/a			Did not advance
Anna Gay	Jump	—N/a	39.7	—N/a		4 Q	—N/a	40.8	—N/a		4
Regina Jaquess	Jump	—N/a	49.4	—N/a		1 Q	—N/a	52.2	—N/a		1st place, gold medalist(s)
Erika Lang	Jump	—N/a	1.0	—N/a		=8	—N/a	Did not advance	—N/a		Did not advance
Anna Gay	Tricks	—N/a		10320	—N/a	3 Q	—N/a		10210	—N/a	3rd place, bronze medalist(s)
Regina Jaquess	Tricks	—N/a		6420	—N/a	7	—N/a		Did not advance	—N/a	Did not advance
Erika Lang	Tricks	—N/a		10590	—N/a	1 Q	—N/a		11030	—N/a	1st place, gold medalist(s)
Anna Gay	Overall	800.00	700.62	974.50	2475.12	3 Q	836.73	744.81	1000.00	2599.36	3rd place, bronze medalist(s)
Regina Jaquess	Overall	1000.00	1000.00	600.57	2600.57	1 Q	1000.00	1000.00	633.02	2633.02	1st place, gold medalist(s)
Erika Lang	Overall	781.82	0.00	1000.00	1781.82	5	Did not advance				

Wakeboard

Athlete	Event	Qualification		Last Chance Qualifier		Final	
Athlete	Event	Score	Rank	Score	Rank	Score	Rank
Daniel Johnson	Men's	77.17	3 Q	Bye		78.33	3rd place, bronze medalist(s)
Mary Morgan Howell	Women's	81.67	2 Q	Bye		80.56	2nd place, silver medalist(s)

== Weightlifting ==
The United States qualified nine weightlifters (four men and five women).

Men

Athlete	Event	Snatch		Clean & jerk		Total	
Athlete	Event	Weight	Rank	Weight	Rank	Weight	Rank
Travis Cooper	–73 kg	137	6	165	=6	302	6
Brandon Victorian	–89 kg	150	7	185	6	335	7
Morgan McCullough	–102 kg	158	8	196	5	354 JGR	6
Keiser Witte	+102 kg	187	1	222	2	409	2nd place, silver medalist(s)

Women

Athlete	Event	Snatch		Clean & jerk		Total	
Athlete	Event	Weight	Rank	Weight	Rank	Weight	Rank
Taylor Wilkins	–59 kg	95	6	115	6	210	6
Meredith Alwine	–71 kg	103	6	136	1	239	3rd place, bronze medalist(s)
Shacasia Johnson	–81 kg	104	5	130	6	234	4
Olivia Reeves	–81 kg	114 JAR	1	144 JAR	1	258 JAR	1st place, gold medalist(s)
Mary Theisen-Lappen	+81 kg	120	1	157	2	277	1st place, gold medalist(s)

== Wrestling ==
The United States qualified 17 wrestlers (11 men and 6 women) through the 2022 Pan American Wrestling Championships and the 2023 Pan American Wrestling Championships.

Key:

- VT – Victory by fall.
- PP – Decision by points – the loser with technical points.
- PO – Decision by points – the loser without technical points.
- SP – Technical superiority – the loser with technical points and a margin of victory of at least 9 (Greco-Roman) or 10 (freestyle) points.
- ST – Great superiority – the loser without technical points and a margin of victory of at least 8 (Greco-Roman) or 10 (freestyle) points.
- VA – Decision by withdrawal
- FO – Decision by forfeit

Men

Athlete	Event	Round of 16	Quarterfinal	Semifinal	Repechage	Final / BM	
Athlete	Event	Opposition Result	Opposition Result	Opposition Result	Opposition Result	Opposition Result	Rank
Zane Richards	Freestyle 57 kg	—N/a	Ramírez (DOM); W 5–0^{FO}	Cruz (PUR); W 3–1^{PP}	Bye	Tigreros (COL); W 4–0ST	1st place, gold medalist(s)
Nahshon Garrett	Freestyle 65 kg	Auccapiña (PER); W 3–1^{PP}	Quispe (CHI); W 4–0ST	Destribats (ARG); W 3–1^{PP}	Bye	Valdés (CUB); L 0–5^{VT}	2nd place, silver medalist(s)
Tyler Berger	Freestyle 74 kg	Bye	Montero (VEN); W 3–1^{PP}	Valencia (MEX); W 4–1^{SP}	Bye	Marén (CUB); W 3–0^{PO}	1st place, gold medalist(s)
Mark Hall	Freestyle 86 kg	Bye	Lee (CAN); W 4–1^{SP}	Ramos (PUR); W 3–0^{PO}	Bye	Torreblanca (CUB); L 1–3^{PP}	2nd place, silver medalist(s)
Kyle Snyder	Freestyle 97 kg	Bye	Randhawa (CAN); W 4–0ST	Lacey (CRC); W 4–0ST	Bye	Silot (CUB); W 4–1^{SP}	1st place, gold medalist(s)
Mason Parris	Freestyle 125 kg	—N/a	Adames (DOM); W 4–0ST	Johnson (JAM); W 4–0ST	Bye	Díaz (VEN); W 3–0^{PO}	1st place, gold medalist(s)
Ildar Hafizov	Greco-Roman 60 kg	Bye	Gurria (MEX); W 5–0^{FO}	Peralta (ECU); W 4–0ST	Bye	de Armas (CUB); W 3–1^{PP}	1st place, gold medalist(s)
Kamal Bey	Greco-Roman 77 kg	Choc (EAI); W 4–1ST	Peña (CUB); W 3–1^{PP}	Bernal (CHI); W 4–0ST	Bye	Júnior (BRA); W 5–0^{VT}	1st place, gold medalist(s)
Zac Braunagel	Greco-Roman 87 kg	Brandao (BRA); W 4–0ST	Muñoz (COL); L 0–4ST	Did not advance			
Josef Rau	Greco-Roman 97 kg	Bye	Jourdan (PUR); W 4–0ST	Rosillo (CUB); L 0–4ST	Bye	Bronze medal final Mejia (HON); L 1–3^{PP}	=5
Cohlton Schultz	Greco-Roman 130 kg	Bye	Lopez (PUR); W 5–0^{VT}	Pérez (VEN); W 3–1^{PP}	Bye	Pino (CUB); L 0–3^{PO}	2nd place, silver medalist(s)

Women

Athlete	Event	Group round			Round of 16	Quarterfinal	Semifinal	Repechage	Final / BM	
Athlete	Event	Opposition Result	Opposition Result	Rank	Opposition Result	Opposition Result	Opposition Result	Opposition Result	Opposition Result	Rank
Erin Golston	Freestyle 50 kg	Bermúdez (ARG); W 5–0^{FO}	Mollocana (ECU); L 0–3^{PO}	2 Q	—N/a		Guzmán (CUB); L 0–4ST	—N/a	Bronze medal final Rojas (VEN); L 0–3^{PO}	=5
Samara Chavez	Freestyle 53 kg	—N/a			Bye	Herin (CUB); L 0–5^{VT}	Did not advance	—N/a	Bronze medal final Argüello (VEN); L 1–4^{SP}	=5
Xochitl Mota-Pettis	Freestyle 57 kg	—N/a			Bye	Penalber (BRA); L 0–5^{VT}	Did not advance	—N/a	Bronze medal final Álvarez (CUB); L 0–4ST	=5
Kayla Miracle	Freestyle 62 kg	—N/a				Ayovi (ECU); W 5–0^{VT}	Nunes (BRA); L 1–3^{PP}	Bye	Bronze medal final Grimán (VEN); W 3–1^{PP}	3rd place, bronze medalist(s)
Forrest Molinari	Freestyle 68 kg	—N/a			Chavez (HON); W 4–0ST	Jiménez (CHI); W 4–0ST	Parrado (COL); W 5–0^{VT}	Bye	Caraballo (VEN); W 3–1^{PP}	1st place, gold medalist(s)
Kylie Welker	Freestyle 76 kg	—N/a			Bye	Reasco (ECU); L 1–3^{PP}	Did not advance			

== See also ==
- United States at the 2023 Parapan American Games
- United States at the 2024 Summer Olympics
