= Lewis Clareburt =

New Zealand swimmer (born 1999)

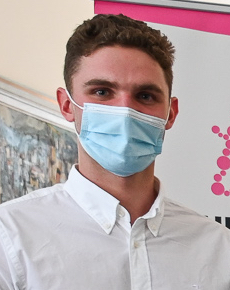
- Clareburt in 2022

Personal information
- Born: 4 July 1999 (age 27) Wellington, New Zealand
- Height: 1.87 m (6 ft 2 in)
- Weight: 78 kg (172 lb)

Sport
- Sport: Swimming
- Strokes: Individual medley
- Club: Capital Swim Club, Club37, New York Breakers
- Coach: Gary Hollywood (2007-2023); Mitch Nairn (2023- )
Medal record
Men's swimming
Representing New Zealand
World Championships (LC)
Gold medal – first place	2024 Doha	400 m medley
Bronze medal – third place	2019 Gwangju	400 m medley
Commonwealth Games
Gold medal – first place	2026 Glasgow	200 m butterfly
Gold medal – first place	2026 Glasgow	400 m medley
Gold medal – first place	2022 Birmingham	200 m butterfly
Gold medal – first place	2022 Birmingham	400 m medley
Silver medal – second place	2026 Glasgow	200 m medley
Bronze medal – third place	2022 Birmingham	200 m medley
Bronze medal – third place	2018 Gold Coast	400 m medley
Commonwealth Youth Games
Gold medal – first place	2017 Nassau	200 m freestyle
Gold medal – first place	2017 Nassau	400 m medley
Gold medal – first place	2017 Nassau	4×200 m mixed freestyle
Silver medal – second place	2017 Nassau	400 m freestyle
Silver medal – second place	2017 Nassau	200 m butterfly
Silver medal – second place	2017 Nassau	200 m medley
Silver medal – second place	2017 Nassau	4×100 m mixed medley

Lewis Clareburt (born 4 July 1999) is a New Zealand competitive swimmer who has represented New Zealand at two Olympics. He is the 2024 Doha 400 metre individual medley World Champion and Commonwealth Champion in 200 metre butterfly and 400 metre individual medley.

Clareburt is one of New Zealand's most decorated swimmers claiming multiple World Championship medals, Commonwealth Games medals and National, Commonwealth and Oceania records.

== Swimming career ==
=== 2016 Junior Pan Pacific Championships ===
Clareburt was selected for the 2016 Junior Pan Pacific Championships held in Hawaii, United States. In the 400 metre individual medley, Clareburt finished 11th overall after swimming a 4:25.54 in the B Final and 12th overall after swimming 3:58.66 in the B Final of the 400 metre freestyle.

=== 2017 Commonwealth Youth Games ===
Clareburt claimed a number of medals at the 2017 Commonwealth Youth Games held in Nassau, The Bahamas including individual titles in the 200 metre freestyle in a time of 1:49.89 and the 400 metre individual medley in a time of 4:18.78.

Clareburt was also part of the 4x200 metre mixed freestyle relay team alongside Chelsey Edwards, Zac Reid and Laticia-Leigh Transom that won gold ahead of England and Australia. He also claimed silver medals in the 400 metre freestyle in a time of 3:54.15, 200 metre butterfly in a time of 2:00.24, 200 metre individual medley in a time of 2:03.06 and the 4x100 metre mixed medley relay alongside Finn Kennard Campbell, Ciara Smith and Transom.

=== 2018 Commonwealth Games ===
The following year as an 18-year-old, Clareburt was a late addition to the New Zealand team heading to the 2018 Commonwealth Games held in Gold Coast, Australia after narrowly missing the selection time.

After securing a spot in the final alongside compatriot Bradlee Ashby, Clareburt claimed a surprise bronze medal in the 400 metre individual medley in a new national record of 4:14.42 with an impressive four second personal best.

Clareburt also made the final of the 200 metre individual medley where he finished 7th in a time of 2:01.13, although this time behind Ashby, as well as finishing 7th in the final of the 200 metre butterfly in a time of 1:58.51. He also finished 10th in the 200 metre backstroke in a time of 2:01.54.

=== 2018 Pan Pacific Championships ===
Clareburt was selected for the 2018 Pan Pacific Championships held in Tokyo, Japan alongside Capital Swim Club teammate Emma Robinson and coach Gary Hollywood.

Clareburt lowered his national record with a 4:14.27 in the A Final of the 400 metre individual medley as he finished 5th. He also finished 8th in the A Final of the 200 metre individual medley in a time of 1:59.31, 8th in the A Final of the 200 metre butterfly in a time of 1:57.37, and 15th overall after swimming a 2:01.10 in the B Final of the 200 metre backstroke.

=== 2019 World Championships ===
Building on a successful year in 2018, Clareburt competed at the 2019 World Championships held in Gwangju, South Korea.

In the final of the 400 individual medley, Clareburt claimed the bronze medal in a new national record of 4:12.07 finishing behind Daiya Seto of Japan and Jay Litherland of the United States. The result made Clareburt just the fifth New Zealander to win a medal at the event and the first since Danyon Loader in 1994. Clareburt was also part of the 4x200 metre freestyle relay that finished 14th in a new national record of 7:13.06 alongside Matthew Stanley, Daniel Hunter and Zac Reid.

=== 2020 International Swimming League ===
Clareburt joined the New York Breakers for the 2020 International Swimming League season.

=== 2020 Summer Olympics ===
Following his performances at World Championships, Clareburt was selected to the national team to compete at the 2020 Summer Olympics held in Tokyo, Japan.

Clareburt put together a fantastic heat swim in the 400 metre individual medley to qualifying second behind Australian Brendon Smith in a time of 4:09.49 in a new national record. However, he could not replicate the swim in the final with a time of 4:11.22 finishing 7th as Chase Kalisz of the United States claimed the gold in a time of 4:09.42. Clareburt also made the final of the 200 metre individual medley where he finished 8th in a time of 1:57.70, he set another national record in the heats in a time of 1:57.27.

Clareburt gained a social media following at the games with a number of TikTok videos including completing a manu in the competition pool.

=== 2022 World Championships ===
Clareburt competed at the 2022 World Championships held in Budapest, Hungary finishing 5th in the final of the 400 metre individual medley in a time of 4:10.98 and 7th in the final of the 200 metre individual medley in a time of 1:58.11 He was also part of the 4x100 metre mixed freestyle relay team that just missed the final alongside Carter Swift, Chelsey Edwards and Laura Littlejohn but set a new national record of 3:27.91.

Clareburt's preparation for the World Championships were impacted by COVID-19 a month before racing started.

=== 2022 Commonwealth Games ===
Clareburt entered the 2022 Commonwealth Games held in Birmingham with high expectations based on his bronze medal in 2018 and was ranked second in both the 200 and 400 metres individual medleys.

In the 400 metre individual medley, Clareburt qualified first in the heats before winning the gold in the final in a time of 4:08.15 ahead of Tokyo bronze medalist Brendon Smith who finished second. The time was a national record, Oceania record and a Games record while the gold medal was the first from a New Zealand swimmer at the Commonweallth Games in sixteen years.

Clareburt backed this up with a second gold medal when he bet 2012 Olympic Champion and multiple time World Champion Chad le Clos in the final 200 metre butterfly in a time of 1:55.60.

Clareburt wrapped up his campaign with a bronze medal in the 200 metre individual medley in a time of 1:57.59 finishing behind Duncan Scott and Tom Dean.

=== 2023 World Championships ===
Clareburt competed in the 2023 World Championships held in Fukuoka, Japan. In the final of the 400 metre individual medley, Clareburt finished 6th in a time of 4:11.29 as Léon Marchand of France broke the world record.

He finished 12th in the semi-finals of the 200 metre individual medley with a time of 1:58.01 and 13th in the semi-finals of the 200 metre butterfly in a time of 1:56.44. He also individually competed in the 100 metre butterfly finishing 33rd in a time of 52.89. The 4x100 metre medley relay that he took part in was disqualified.

=== 2024 World Championships ===
With the swimming calendar condensed due to impact of COVID-19, World Championships were held in consecutive years and in same year as the Summer Olympics with Clareburt opting to use the Championships to gain momentum ahead of the Olympics. Clareburt also switched programmes shifting to Auckland in the build up to the Championships splitting with longtime coach and mentor Gary Hollywood.

In the final of the 400 metre individual medley, Clareburt claimed the gold medal ahead of British swimmer Max Litchfield and Daiya Seto of Japan in a time of 4:09.72. The result mirrored compatriot Erika Fairweather who had earlier won gold in the 400 metre freestyle becoming the first New Zealander in history to win a gold medal at the event.

Clareburt also finished 7th in the final of the 200 metre butterfly in a time of 1:55.86, and 7th in the final of the 200 metre individual medley in a time of 1:58.66.

=== 2024 Summer Olympics ===
Clareburt earlier qualified for his second Olympic games at the 2024 New Zealand Championships and was named as part of the team to attend the 2024 Summer Olympics held in Paris, France.

He finished sixth in the final of the 400 individual medley, in a time of 4:10.44 .

In the semi-finals of the 200 metre individual medley he finished 14th overall with a time of 2:00.06, and in the heats of the 200 metre butterfly he was 21st overall with a time of 1:57.12.

== Surf Life Saving ==
Clareburt attributes competing in Surf Life Saving as a reason he remained in the sport of competitive swimming after joining the local Lyall Bay Surf Club aged 13.

He was named in teams throughout his career including the 2017 International Surf Rescue Challenge held at Mount Maunganui and 2017 World Rescue Championships in the Netherlands.

Clareburt was named in the New Zealand Black Fins team to take part at World Championships in Italy in 2022 but suffered a broken arm in a skateboarding accident before the event.

== Honours ==
- 2017: Junior Sportsman - Aotearoa Māori Sports Awards
- 2018: Junior Sportsman - Aotearoa Māori Sports Awards
- 2018: Swimming New Zealand Baxter O’Neill Trophy - Swimming of the Year Award
- 2019: Swimming New Zealand Baxter O’Neill Trophy - Swimming of the Year Award
- 2021: Swimming New Zealand Baxter O’Neill Trophy - Swimming of the Year Award
- 2022: Swimming New Zealand Baxter O’Neill Trophy - Swimming of the Year Award
- 2022: Senior Māori Sportsperson of the Year

== Personal life ==
Clareburt was born and grew up in Wellington, New Zealand, where he attended Scots College in his youth. Clareburt studied a Bachelor of Commerce at Victoria University.

Clareburt has a connection with Māori iwi Waikato Tainui.
