= Swimming at the 2017 Commonwealth Youth Games =

- Venue: Betty Kelly Kenning Swim Complex
- Dates: 19–22 July 2017
- Competitors: 184 from 45 nations

The swimming competitions at the 2017 Commonwealth Youth Games in Nassau, The Bahamas took place from 19 to 22 July at the Betty Kelly Kenning Swim Complex. A total of 184 athletes from 45 nations contested 35 different events. Each Commonwealth Games Association was allowed to enter up to two swimmers (individual events) and one relay per event. In the Games, age limits set by the Fédération Internationale de Natation (FINA) for world Junior competitions were followed, according to which the age limit for boys is set to 15–18 years (means swimmers born in 1999, 2000, 2001 and 2002) and for girls its 14–17 years of age (means swimmers born in 2000, 2001, 2002 and 2003).

== Format ==
The competition will feature 35 long course (50m) events, divided between males, females and mixed events into the following events:

- freestyle: 50, 100, 200, 400, 800 (females only) and 1500 (males only);
- backstroke: 50, 100 and 200;
- breaststroke: 50, 100 and 200;
- butterfly: 50, 100 and 200;
- individual medley (I.M.): 200 and 400;
- mixed relays: 4x100 free, 4x200 free and 4x100 medley

== Medal summary ==
=== Medal table ===
Rank	Nation	Gold	Silver	Bronze	Total
1	England	8	9	4	21
2	South Africa	8	3	4	15
3	New Zealand	7	8	5	20
4	Singapore	7	4	6	17
5	Scotland	3	2	3	8
6	Australia	1	2	5	8
7	Wales	1	1	2	4
8	Northern Ireland	0	2	2	4
9	Bahamas*	0	2	1	3
10	Sri Lanka	0	2	0	2
11	Botswana	0	0	1	1
11	Fiji	0	0	1	1
11	Trinidad and Tobago	0	0	1	1
Totals (13 entries)		35	35	35	105

The host country is highlighted in lavender blue

=== Men ===
Event	Gold		Silver		Bronze	
50 m freestyle	Scott McLay; Scotland	23.10	Kyle Abeysinghe; Sri Lanka	23.38	Jeron Thompson; Trinidad and Tobago	23.43
100 m freestyle	Scott McLay; Scotland	50.46	Kyle Abeysinghe; Sri Lanka*	50.93	Jonathan Tan; Singapore	51.10
200 m freestyle	Lewis Clareburt; New Zealand	1:49.89	Jarryd Baxter; South Africa	1:50.50	Jack McMillan; Northern Ireland	1:50.72
400 m freestyle	Jarryd Baxter; South Africa	3:53.76	Lewis Clareburt; New Zealand	3:54.15	Jakob Goodman; England	3:55.67
1500 m freestyle	Zac Reid; New Zealand	15:40.11	Max Osborn; Australia	15:50.64	James Freeman; Botswana	15:53.73
50 m backstroke	Finn Kennard Campbell; New Zealand	26.18	Jahrel Murphy; England	26.44	Francis Fong; Singapore	26.50
100 m backstroke	Francis Fong; Singapore	56.42	Scott McClay; Scotland	56.53	Finn Kennard Campbell; New Zealand	56.85
200 m backstroke	Jarryd Baxter; South Africa	2:00.90	James McFadzen; England	2:03.21	Francis Fong; Singapore	2:05.00
50 m breaststroke	Michael Houlie; South Africa	27.68	Izaak Bastian; Bahamas	28.77	Zongxian Khoo; Singapore	29.19
100 m breaststroke	Michael Houlie; South Africa	1:01.86	Zongxian Khoo; Singapore	1:03.41	Izaak Bastian; Bahamas	1:03.71
200 m breaststroke	Luan Grobbelaar; South Africa	2:16.44	Michael Houlie; South Africa	2:16.97	Taichi Vakasama; Fiji	2:17.17
50 m butterfly	Scott McLay; Scotland	24.53	Dylan Koo; Singapore	24.55	Lewis Fraser; Wales	24.66
100 m butterfly	Lewis Fraser; Wales	53.87	Dylan Koo; Singapore	54.32	Ong Jung Yi; Singapore	54.35
200 m butterfly	Mason Wilby; England	1:59.89	Lewis Clareburt; New Zealand	2:00.24	Charles Cox; Australia	2:01.02
200 m individual medley	Thomas Dean; England	2:02.13	Lewis Clareburt; New Zealand	2:03.06	James McFadzen; England	2:04.39
400 m individual medley	Lewis Clareburt; New Zealand	4:18.78	Thomas Dean; England	4:24.47	Ethan McAleese; Australia	4:25.42

- During the competition Abeysinghe won the silver medal in the men's 100m freestyle event, marking Sri Lanka's first ever swimming medal at either the Youth or Senior Commonwealth Games.

=== Women ===
Event	Gold		Silver		Bronze	
50 m freestyle	Meg Harris; Australia	25.89	Elzbeita Noble; Australia	25.97	Laticia-Leigh Transom; New Zealand	26.02
100 m freestyle	Quah Jing Wen; Singapore	56.31	Laticia-Leigh Transom; New Zealand	56.59	Sophie Smith; Scotland	56.95
200 m freestyle	Laticia-Leigh Transom; New Zealand	2:01.56	Sophie Smith; Scotland	2:02.32	Rebecca Meder; South Africa	2:02.56
400 m freestyle	Leah Crisp; England	4:16.36	Rachel Bethel; Northern Ireland	4:16.43	Sophie Caldwell; Australia	4:17.76
800 m freestyle	Leah Crisp; England	8:49.94	Rachel Bethel; Northern Ireland	8:54.06	Rebecca Meder; South Africa	8:54.21
50 m backstroke	Lily Boseley; England	29.04	Medi Harris; Wales	29.34	Mariella Venter; South Africa	29.66
100 m backstroke	Mariella Venter; South Africa	1:01.77	Lily Boseley; England	1:02.19	Gina Galloway; New Zealand	1:02.68
200 m backstroke	Mariella Venter; South Africa	2:13.57	Lily Boseley; England	2:14.79	Medi Harris; Wales	2:16.52
50 m breaststroke	Christie Chue; Singapore	32.38	Lilly Higgs; Bahamas	32.52	Ciara Smith; New Zealand	32.56
100 m breaststroke	Hanim Abrahams; South Africa	1:10.14	Christie Chue; Singapore	1:10.72	Ciara Smith; New Zealand	1:11.07
200 m breaststroke	Layla Black; England	2:31.00	Mya Rasmussen; New Zealand	2:31.49	Hanim Abrahams; South Africa	2:32.32
50 m butterfly	Quah Jing Wen; Singapore	27.23	Alicia Wilson; England	27.28	Emma Harvey; Scotland	27.56f
100 m butterfly	Quah Jing Wen; Singapore	59.92	Ciara Schlosshan; England	1:00.14	Hannah Bates; New Zealand	1:01.27
200 m butterfly	Ciara Schlosshan; England	2:10.95	Quah Jing Wen; Singapore	2:13.29	Brittany Castelluzzo; Australia	2:13.80
200 m individual medley	Alicia Wilson; England	2:15.49	Mya Rasmussen; New Zealand	2:16.55	Shannon Russell; Northern Ireland	2:17.97
400 m individual medley	Mya Rasmussen; New Zealand	4:42.19	Rebecca Meder; South Africa	4:46.69	Ciara Schlosshan; England	4:49.22

=== Mixed ===
Event	Gold		Silver		Bronze	
4×100 m freestyle relay	Singapore (SGP); Chua Yi Shou; Natasha Ong; Quah Jing Wen; Jonathan Tan	3:36.01	England (ENG); Harry Constantine; Elizabeth Harris; Mason Wilby; Alicia Wilson	3:36.17	Scotland (SCO); Anna Fleming; Emma Harvey; Scott McLay; Luke Robins	3:37.05
4×200 m freestyle relay	New Zealand (NZL); Lewis Clareburt; Chelsey Edwards; Zac Reid; Laticia-Leigh Transom	7:50.85	England (ENG); Harry Constantine; Leah Crisp; Jakob Goodman; Elizabeth Harris	7:55.79	Australia (AUS); Daniel Jacobson; Charlotte Mitchell; Max Osborn; Katie Strachan	7:57.74
4×100 m medley relay	Singapore (SGP); Francis Fong; Zongxian Khoo; Quah Jing Wen; Toh Fann Rui	3:56.74	New Zealand (NZL); Lewis Clareburt; Finn Kennard Campbell; Ciara Smith; Laticia-Leigh Transom	3:57.21	England (ENG); Elizabeth Harris; James McFadzen; Jahrel Murphy; Alicia Wilson	3:59.33

== Participating nations ==
There were 45 participating nations at the swimming competitions with a total of 184 swimmers. The number of athletes a nation entered is in parentheses beside the name of the country.

- Antigua and Barbuda (2)
- Australia (14)
- Bahamas (20) (host nation)
- Bangladesh (2)
- Barbados (2)
- Bermuda (2)
- Botswana (1)
- Cayman Islands (3)
- Cook Islands (1)
- Cyprus (2)
- England (12)
- Fiji (3)
- Ghana (2)
- Gibraltar (5)
- Grenada (1)
- Guernsey (3)
- Guyana (2)
- India (4)
- Isle of Man (4)
- Jersey (2)
- Malta (3)
- Malawi (1)
- Malaysia (5)
- Mauritius (1)
- Mozambique (2)
- New Zealand (11)
- Nigeria (4)
- Northern Ireland (4)
- Pakistan (2)
- Papua New Guinea (2)
- Saint Helena (2)
- Saint Lucia (2)
- Saint Vincent and the Grenadines (3)
- Samoa (2)
- Scotland (8)
- Sierra Leone (2)
- Singapore (13)
- South Africa (8)
- Sri Lanka (4)
- Tanzania (2)
- Tonga (3)
- Trinidad and Tobago (1)
- Uganda (1)
- Wales (10)
- Zambia (1)
