= Swimming at the 2020 Summer Olympics – Men's 400 metre individual medley =

Men's 400 metre individual medley at the Games of the XXXII Olympiad
- Venue: Tokyo Aquatics Centre
- Dates: 24 July 2021 (heats); 25 July 2021 (final)
- Competitors: 29 from 23 nations
- Winning time: 4:09.42

Medalists
1st place, gold medalist(s)		Chase Kalisz	United States
2nd place, silver medalist(s)		Jay Litherland	United States
3rd place, bronze medalist(s)		Brendon Smith	Australia

The men's 400 metre individual medley event at the 2020 Summer Olympics was held on 24 and 25 July 2021 at the Tokyo Aquatics Centre. It was the event's fifteenth consecutive appearance, having been held at every edition since 1964.

== Summary ==
In the first swimming final at these Games, the U.S.' Chase Kalisz used a scintillating breaststroke leg to upgrade his silver from Rio five years earlier with an Olympic title in the event. In the slowest Olympic final since 2000, Kalisz was the only finalist to improve on his heat time, clocking 4:09.42 to take the win. Kalisz's teammate Jay Litherland closed strongly in the final freestyle leg but could not overtake Kalisz, taking silver in 4:10.28 to deliver a U.S. quinella.

Australia's Brendon Smith (4:10.38) almost pulled off a last-to-first victory, sitting in eighth heading into the freestyle before splitting a blistering 56.3 to take bronze. With the podium finish, Smith claimed his nation's first medal in the event since Robert Woodhouse also won bronze in 1984. Only two-tenths of a second back, Hungary's Dávid Verrasztó and Great Britain's Max Litchfield were shut out of the medals, tying for fourth in 4:10.59. France's Léon Marchand (4:11.16), New Zealand's Lewis Clareburt (4:11.22) and Italy's Alberto Razzetti rounded out the tight field, with first to eighth separated by just two seconds.

Notable swimmers to miss the final included Japan's reigning World champion Daiya Seto who finished ninth in the heats, only 0.32 seconds behind the last qualifier. Fellow countryman Kosuke Hagino elected to not defend his Olympic title.

The medals for the competition were presented by Austria's IOC member Karl Stoss and the gifts were presented by Kuwait's FINA President Husain Al-Musallam.

== Records ==
Prior to this competition, the existing world and Olympic records were as follows.

World record	Michael Phelps (USA)	4:03.84	Beijing, China	10 August 2008
Olympic record	Michael Phelps (USA)	4:03.84	Beijing, China	10 August 2008

No new records were set during the competition.

== Qualification ==
The Olympic Qualifying Time for the event is 4:15.84. Up to two swimmers per National Olympic Committee (NOC) can automatically qualify by swimming that time at an approved qualification event. The Olympic Selection Time is 4:21.46. Up to one swimmer per NOC meeting that time is eligible for selection, allocated by world ranking until the maximum quota for all swimming events is reached. NOCs without a male swimmer qualified in any event can also use their universality place.

== Competition format ==
The competition consists of two rounds: heats and a final. The swimmers with the best 8 times in the heats advance to the final. Swim-offs are used as necessary to break ties for advancement to the next round.

== Schedule ==
All times are Japan Standard Time (UTC+9)

Date	Time	Round
24 July	19:02	Heats
25 July	10:30	Final

== Results ==
The swimmers with the top 8 times, regardless of heat, advanced to the final.

=== Heats ===
Rank	Heat	Lane	Swimmer	Nation	Time	Notes
1	4	6	Brendon Smith	Australia	4:09.27	Q, OC
2	3	3	Lewis Clareburt	New Zealand	4:09.49	Q, NR
3	3	4	Chase Kalisz	United States	4:09.65	Q
4	3	5	Dávid Verrasztó	Hungary	4:09.80	Q
5	4	5	Jay Litherland	United States	4:09.91	Q
5	4	2	Alberto Razzetti	Italy	4:09.91	Q
7	4	3	Léon Marchand	France	4:10.09	Q
8	3	6	Max Litchfield	Great Britain	4:10.20	Q
9	4	4	Daiya Seto	Japan	4:10.52	
10	4	7	Wang Shun	China	4:10.63	
11	3	2	Yuki Ikari	Japan	4:12.08	
12	4	1	Jacob Heidtmann	Germany	4:12.09	
13	3	1	Péter Bernek	Hungary	4:12.38	
14	3	7	Apostolos Papastamos	Greece	4:12.50	
15	2	4	Joan Lluís Pons	Spain	4:12.67	NR
16	2	6	Se-Bom Lee	Australia	4:15.76	
17	2	5	Arjan Knipping	Netherlands	4:15.83	
18	2	2	Maxim Stupin	ROC	4:16.21	
19	4	8	Pier Andrea Matteazzi	Italy	4:16.31	
20	1	5	José Paulo Lopes	Portugal	4:16.52	
21	3	8	Brodie Williams	Great Britain	4:17.27	
22	2	8	Jarod Arroyo	Puerto Rico	4:17.46	
23	2	7	Richard Nagy	Slovakia	4:18.29	
24	1	4	Tomas Peribonio	Ecuador	4:18.73	
25	2	1	Wang Hsing-hao	Chinese Taipei	4:19.06	
26	2	3	Maksym Shemberev	Azerbaijan	4:19.40	
27	1	3	Ron Polonsky	Israel	4:21.50	
28	1	6	Christoph Meier	Liechtenstein	4:25.17	
29	1	2	Luis Vega Torres	Cuba	4:27.65	

=== Final ===
Rank	Lane	Swimmer	Nation	Time	Notes
1st place, gold medalist(s)	3	Chase Kalisz	United States	4:09.42	
2nd place, silver medalist(s)	7	Jay Litherland	United States	4:10.28	
3rd place, bronze medalist(s)	4	Brendon Smith	Australia	4:10.38	
4	6	Dávid Verrasztó	Hungary	4:10.59	
4	8	Max Litchfield	Great Britain	4:10.59	
6	1	Léon Marchand	France	4:11.16	
7	5	Lewis Clareburt	New Zealand	4:11.22	
8	2	Alberto Razzetti	Italy	4:11.32	
