= 2018 Pan Pacific Swimming Championships – Men's 200 metre butterfly =

Men's 200 metre butterfly at the 2018 Pan Pacific Swimming Championships
- Venue: Tokyo Tatsumi International Swimming Center
- Dates: 10 August (heats & finals)
- Competitors: 20 from 10 nations
- Winning time: 1:54.34

Medalists
gold medal	Daiya Seto	Japan
silver medal	Leonardo de Deus	Brazil
bronze medal	Zach Harting	United States

The men's 200 metre butterfly competition at the 2018 Pan Pacific Swimming Championships took place on August 10 at the Tokyo Tatsumi International Swimming Center. The defending champion was Daiya Seto of Japan.

== Records ==
Prior to this competition, the existing world and Pan Pacific records were as follows:

World record	Michael Phelps (USA)	1:51.51	Rome, Italy	29 July 2009
Pan Pacific Championships record	Michael Phelps (USA)	1:53.80	Victoria, Canada	17 August 2006

== Results ==
All times are in minutes and seconds.

KEY:	QA	Qualified A Final	QB	Qualified B Final	CR	Championships record	NR	National record	PB	Personal best	SB	Seasonal best

=== Heats ===
The first round was held on 10 August from 10:00.

Only two swimmers from each country may advance to the A or B final. If a country not qualify any swimmer to the A final, that same country may qualify up to three swimmers to the B final.

Rank	Name	Nationality	Time	Notes
1	Jack Conger	United States	1:55.18	QA
2	Zach Harting	United States	1:55.28	QA
3	Daiya Seto	Japan	1:55.57	QA
4	Leonardo de Deus	Brazil	1:55.99	QA
5	Yuya Yajima	Japan	1:56.16	QA
6	Justin Wright	United States	1:56.37	QB
7	Mack Darragh	Canada	1:57.10	QA
8	David Morgan	Australia	1:57.12	QA
9	Nao Horomura	Japan	1:57.16	QB
10	Lewis Clareburt	New Zealand	1:57.36	QA
11	Jay Litherland	United States	1:58.04	QB
12	Luiz Altamir Melo	Brazil	1:58.09	QB
13	Jonathan Gómez	Colombia	1:58.20	QB
14	Chase Kalisz	United States	1:58.91	
15	Shen Jiahao	China	1:59.42	QB
16	Iago Moussalem	Brazil	1:59.93	~~QB~~, WD
17	Zhou Shuchang	China	2:01.37	QB
18	Jarod Hatch	Philippines	2:04.57	QB
19	Timothy Yen	Philippines	2:12.45	
20	Nelson Batallones	Northern Mariana Islands	2:32.92	

=== B Final ===
The B final was held on 10 August from 18:00.

Rank	Name	Nationality	Time	Notes
9	Luiz Altamir Melo	Brazil	1:56.23	
10	Justin Wright	United States	1:57.27	
11	Jay Litherland	United States	1:58.31	
12	Nao Horomura	Japan	1:58.74	
13	Shen Jiahao	China	1:58.82	
14	Zhou Shuchang	China	1:59.00	
15	Jonathan Gómez	Colombia	2:00.84	
16	Jarod Hatch	Philippines	2:03.45	

=== A Final ===
The A final was held on 10 August from 18:00.

Rank	Name	Nationality	Time	Notes
1st place, gold medalist(s)	Daiya Seto	Japan	1:54.34	
2nd place, silver medalist(s)	Leonardo de Deus	Brazil	1:54.89	
3rd place, bronze medalist(s)	Zach Harting	United States	1:55.05	
4	David Morgan	Australia	1:55.82	
5	Mack Darragh	Canada	1:56.27	
6	Yuya Yajima	Japan	1:56.33	
7	Jack Conger	United States	1:56.83	
8	Lewis Clareburt	New Zealand	1:57.37	
