= 2022 U.S. Open Swimming Championships =

Swimming competition in the United States

2022 Toyota U.S. Open Championships
- Host city: Greensboro, North Carolina, United States
- Date: November 30 – December 3
- Venue: Greensboro Aquatic Center
- Events: 34

The 2022 Toyota U.S. Open Swimming Championships took place from November 30 to December 3, 2022 at Greensboro Aquatic Center in Greensboro, North Carolina, United States. Competition was conducted in a long course (50-meter) pool. Swimmers were allowed to compete representing their country, national swimming federation, or a swim club, or unattached.

== Results ==
=== Men ===
Event	Gold		Silver		Bronze	
50 m freestyle	David Curtiss; North Carolina State University	21.92	Joshua Liendo; University of Florida	21.99	Victor Alcará; Brazil	22.11
100 m freestyle	Andrej Barna; Louisville Cardinals	48.45	Joshua Liendo; University of Florida	48.97	Matt King; University of Virginia	49.05
200 m freestyle	Jake Mitchell; University of Florida	1:47.38	Zane Grothe; Boulder City Henderson Heatwave	1:48.15	Guilherme Costa; Brazil	1:48.34
400 m freestyle	Guilherme Costa; Brazil	3:48.13	Alfonso Mestre; University of Florida	3:49.63	Jake Mitchell; University of Florida	3:49.65
800 m freestyle	Guilherme Costa; Brazil	7:54.10	Alfonso Mestre; University of Florida	7:54.80	Stephan Steverink; Brazil	8:01.08
1500 m freestyle	Alfonso Mestre; University of Florida	15:16.51	Pedro Farias; Brazil	15:20.12	Eric Brown; University of Florida	15:26.67
100 m backstroke	Daniel Diehl; Cumberland YMCA	53.07	Evangelos Makrygiannis; University of Southern California	54.41	Tommy Janton; University of Notre Dame	54.96
200 m backstroke	Daniel Diehl; Cumberland YMCA	1:56.41	Nico García; Virginia Tech	1:59.49	Baylor Nelson; Texas A&M	2:00.98
100 m breaststroke	Aleksas Savickas; University of Florida	1:00.54	Lyubomir Epitropov; University of Tennessee	1:00.94	Reid Mikuta; Auburn University	1:00.96
200 m breaststroke	Aleksas Savickas; University of Florida	2:09.68	Chase Kalisz; Sun Devils	2:10.10	Lyubomir Epitropov; University of Tennessee	2:11.74
100 m butterfly	Luke Miller; North Carolina State University	52.06	Joshua Liendo; University of Florida	52.48	Zach Harting; Louisville Cardinals	52.52
200 m butterfly	Nicholas Albiero; Louisville Cardinals	1:56.32	Zach Harting; Louisville Cardinals	1:57.06	Héctor Ruvalcaba; AGS Sports	1:59.63
200 m individual medley	Chase Kalisz; Sun Devils	1:56.52; CR	Baylor Nelson; Texas A&M	1:59.14	Daniel Diehl; Cumberland YMCA	1:59.89
400 m individual medley	Chase Kalisz; Sun Devils	4:10.09; CR	Baylor Nelson; Texas A&M	4:18.38	Landon Driggers; University of Tennessee	4:20.85
4×100 m freestyle relay	New South Wales Swim; Jack Wilson (52.36); James Koch (51.47); Joseph Hamson (50.19); Thomas Hay (50.21)	3:24.23	Ireland; Evan Bailey (52.01); Thomas Fannon (50.46); Jack Cassin (51.59); Thomas Leggett (51.07)	3:25.13	Auburn University; Kalle Makinen (50.59); Aidan Stoffle (50.81); Andrew Simmons (53.40); Sohib Khaled (51.77)	3:26.57
4×200 m freestyle relay	New South Wales Swim; James Koch (1:48.61); Ryan Wilkes (1:51.41); Thomas Hay (1:52.11); Gabriel Gorgas (1:50.38)	7:22.51	Swimmac Carolina; Alex Ayers (1:57.02); Jack Haywood (1:53.02); Granger Bartee (1:56.46); Norvin Clontz (1:53.40)	7:39.90	none awarded	
4×100 m medley relay	Auburn University; Aidan Stoffle (55.21); Reid Mikuta (1:01.41); Sohib Khaled (54.28); Kalle Makinen (49.82)	3:40.72	University of Tennessee; Landon Driggers (57.02); Lyubomir Epitropov (1:00.31); Griffin Hadley (55.15); Michael Houlie (50.96)	3:43.44	New South Wales Swim; Jack Wilson (58.74); Angus Menzies (1:01.86); Joseph Hamson (53.31); James Koch (50.14)	3:44.05

=== Women ===
Event	Gold		Silver		Bronze	
50 m freestyle	Gabi Albiero; University of Louisville	25.06	Erika Pelaez; Eagle Aquatics	25.29	Camille Spink; Nation's Capital Swim Club	25.36
100 m freestyle	Gabi Albiero; University of Louisville	54.90	Beata Nelson; Wisconsin Aquatics	54.94	Camille Spink; Nation's Capital Swim Club	55.47
200 m freestyle	Katie Ledecky; Gator Swim Club	1:56.74	Erin Gemmell; Nation's Capital Swim Club	1:57.16	Addison Sauickie; Sarasota Sharks	1:59.76
400 m freestyle	Katie Ledecky; Gator Swim Club	3:59.71; CR	Summer McIntosh; Sarasota Sharks	3:59.79	Michaela Mattes; Sarasota Sharks	4:09.53
800 m freestyle	Katie Ledecky; Gator Swim Club	8:13.90	Michaela Mattes; Sarasota Sharks	8:37.89	Cavan Gormsen; Long Island Aquatic Club	8:38.15
1500 m freestyle	Katie Ledecky; Gator Swim Club	15:44.13	Beatriz Dizotti; Brazil	16:18.40	Michaela Mattes; Sarasota Sharks	16:34.75
100 m backstroke	Regan Smith; Sun Devils	57.95; CR	Katharine Berkoff; North Carolina State University	59.87	Josephine Fuller; University of Tennessee	1:00.00
200 m backstroke	Regan Smith; Sun Devils	2:05.28; CR	Summer McIntosh; Sarasota Sharks	2:07.15	Josephine Fuller; University of Tennessee	2:09.77
100 m breaststroke	Mona McSharry; Ireland	1:07.06	Kaelyn Gridley; Duke University	1:08.46	Ana Carolina Vieira; Brazil	1:08.50
200 m breaststroke	Gillian Davey; University of Kentucky	2:27.06	Mona McSharry; Ireland	2:27.59	Ashleigh Oberekar; New South Wales Swim	2:28.34
100 m butterfly	Regan Smith; Sun Devils	57.65	Beata Nelson; Wisconsin Aquatics	58.93	Gabi Albiero; University of Louisville	59.06
200 m butterfly	Regan Smith; Sun Devils	2:07.30	Lindsay Looney; University of Arizona	2:10.25	Charlotte Hook; Stanford University	2:10.64
200 m individual medley	Regan Smith; Sun Devils	2:10.40	Leah Hayes; Fox Valley Riptides	2:10.67	Zoe Dixon; University of Florida	2:14.37
400 m individual medley	Summer McIntosh; Sarasota Sharks	4:28.61; CR,WJ,US	Emma Weyant; University of Florida	4:41.85	Kathryn Hazle; North Coast Aquatics	4:47.56
4×100 m freestyle relay	Ireland; Victoria Catterson (57.67); Danielle Hill (55.29); Mona McSharry (56.52); Grace Davidson (57.35)	3:46.83	University of Tennessee; Julia Burroughs (56.72); Brooklyn Douthwright (56.21); Josephine Fuller (58.53); Kate McCarville (56.68)	3:48.14	Cougar Aquatics; Angela di Palo (56.84); Hailey Grotte (57.88); Kristen de Goede (56.85); Noelle Harvey (56.65)	3:48.22
4×200 m freestyle relay	Cougar Aquatics; Noelle Harvey (2:07.14); Dori Hathazi (2:04.32); Kristen de Goede (2:08.12); Angela di Palo (2:05.63)	8:25.21	none awarded		none awarded	
4×100 m medley relay	Ireland; Danielle Hill (1:02.98); Mona McSharry (1:07.12); Molly Mayne (1:01.75); Victoria Catterson (55.84)	4:07.69	University of Tennessee; Josephine Fuller (1:01.11); Kailee Morgan (1:10.82); Brooklyn Douthwright (1:01.31); Julia Burroughs (56.31)	4:09.55	Duke University; Emma Shuppert (1:04.24); Kaelyn Gridley (1:09.93); Aleyna Ozkan (1:02.49); Sally Foley (55.73)	4:12.39

== World records set ==
Day	Event	Stage	Time	Name	Country	Date	Type	Age	Ref
3	400 m individual medley (Women's)	Final	4:28.61	Summer McIntosh	Canada	December 2, 2022	World junior record	16 years, 106 days	

== Championships records set ==
Day	Event	Stage	Time	Name	Country	Date	Ref
2	400 m freestyle (Women's)	Final	3:59.71	Katie Ledecky	United States	December 1, 2022	
2	200 m individual medley (Men's)	Final	1:56.52	Chase Kalisz	United States	December 1, 2022	
3	400 m individual medley (Women's)	Final	4:28.61	Summer McIntosh	Canada	December 2, 2022	
3	400 m individual medley (Men's)	Final	4:10.09	Chase Kalisz	United States	December 2, 2022	
3	100 m backstroke (Women's)	Final	57.95	Regan Smith	United States	December 2, 2022	
4	200 m backstroke (Women's)	Final	2:05.28	Regan Smith	United States	December 3, 2022	
