= Swimming at the 2023 Pan American Games – Men's 400 metre individual medley =

Men's 400 metre individual medley at the 2023 Pan American Games
- Venue: Aquatic Centre
- Date: October 24, 2023
- Competitors: 19 from 13 nations

Medalists
Gold medal	Jay Litherland	United States
Silver medal	Collyn Gagne	Canada
Bronze medal	Brandonn Almeida	Brazil

The men's 400 metre individual medley competition of the swimming events at the 2023 Pan American Games were held on October 24, 2023, at the Aquatic Center in Santiago, Chile.

== Records ==
Prior to this competition, the existing world and Pan American Games records were as follows:

World record	Leon Marchand (FRA)	4:02.50	Fukuoka, Japan	July 23, 2023
Pan American Games record	Thiago Pereira (BRA)	4:11.14	Rio de Janeiro, Brazil	July 17, 2007

== Results ==
KEY:	QA	Qualified for A final	QB	Qualified for B final	GR	Games record	NR	National record	PB	Personal best	SB	Seasonal best

=== Heats ===
The first round was held on October 24.

Rank	Heat	Lane	Name	Nationality	Time	Notes
1	3	4	Jay Litherland	United States	4:21.48	QA
2	2	4	Collyn Gagne	Canada	4:22.14	QA
3	3	5	Ian Grum	United States	4:22.35	QA
4	3	3	Brandonn Almeida	Brazil	4:22.46	QA
5	3	6	Erick Gordillo	Independent Athletes Team	4:22.59	QA
6	2	2	Benjamin Côté	Canada	4:23.68	QA
7	2	5	Alexander Steverink	Brazil	4:24.98	QA
8	3	7	Maximiliano Vega	Mexico	4:25.40	QA
9	3	2	Roberto Bonilla	Independent Athletes Team	4:25.60	QB
10	3	1	Jarod Arroyo	Puerto Rico	4:26.00	QB
11	2	6	Joaquín Piñero	Argentina	4:29.02	QB
12	2	3	Héctor Ruvalcaba	Mexico	4:31.33	QB
13	2	7	Matheo Mateos	Paraguay	4:33.80	QB
14	2	1	Sebastián Camacho	Colombia	4:36.20	QB
15	3	8	Matías López	Paraguay	4:39.33	QB
16	1	5	Manuel Osório	Chile	4:41.07	QB
17	2	8	Sam Williamson	Bermuda	4:43.76	
	1	4	Maximillian Wilson	Virgin Islands	DNS	
	1	3	Raekwon Noel	Guyana	DSQ	

=== Final B ===
The B final was also held on October 24.

Rank	Lane	Name	Nationality	Time	Notes
9	4	Roberto Bonilla	Independent Athletes Team	4:23.20	
10	5	Jarod Arroyo	Puerto Rico	4:28.42	
11	3	Joaquín Piñero	Argentina	4:28.47	
12	6	Matheo Mateos	Paraguay	4:35.13	
13	2	Matías López	Paraguay	4:37.72	
14	7	Sam Williamson	Bermuda	4:40.99	

=== Final A ===
The A final was also held on October 24.

Rank	Lane	Name	Nationality	Time	Notes
1st place, gold medalist(s)	4	Jay Litherland	United States	4:15.44	
2nd place, silver medalist(s)	5	Collyn Gagne	Canada	4:17.05	
3rd place, bronze medalist(s)	6	Brandonn Almeida	Brazil	4:18.74	
4	3	Ian Grum	United States	4:18.78	
5	2	Erick Gordillo	Independent Athletes Team	4:19.31	
6	1	Alexander Steverink	Brazil	4:22.29	
7	7	Benjamin Côté	Canada	4:23.14	
8	8	Maximiliano Vega	Mexico	4:23.34	
