= Swimming at the 2022 Commonwealth Games – Men's 200 metre butterfly =

Men's 200 metre butterfly at the 2022 Commonwealth Games
- Venue: Sandwell Aquatics Centre
- Date: 31 July 2022
- Competitors: 20 from 14 nations
- Winning time: 1:55.60

Medalists
gold medal	Lewis Clareburt	New Zealand
silver medal	Chad le Clos	South Africa
bronze medal	James Guy	England

The men's 200 metre butterfly event at the 2022 Commonwealth Games was held on 31 July at the Sandwell Aquatics Centre. The event was won by New Zealand's Lewis Clareburt, defeating South Africa's Chad le Clos, the event's reigning Commonwealth champion.

== Records ==
Prior to this competition, the existing world, Commonwealth and Games records were as follows:

World record	Kristóf Milák (HUN)	1:50.34	Budapest, Hungary	21 June 2022
Commonwealth record	Chad le Clos (RSA)	1:52.96	London, United Kingdom	31 July 2012
Games record	Chad le Clos (RSA)	1:54.00	Gold Coast, Australia	7 April 2018

== Schedule ==
The schedule is as follows:

All times are British Summer Time (UTC+1)

Date	Time	Round
Sunday 31 July 2022	10:30	Heats
Sunday 31 July 2022	19:28	Final

== Results ==
=== Heats ===
Rank	Heat	Lane	Name	Nationality	Time	Notes
1	3	3	Lewis Clareburt	New Zealand	1:56.76	Q
2	3	4	Chad le Clos	South Africa	1:56.85	Q
3	3	6	Duncan Scott	Scotland	1:57.48	Q
4	2	4	Bowen Gough	Australia	1:57.53	Q
5	2	5	Jay Lelliott	England	1:57.93	Q
6	1	4	Mason Wilby	England	1:57.97	Q
7	1	5	James Guy	England	1:58.30	Q
8	2	6	Brendon Smith	Australia	1:58.86	Q
9	2	3	Kieren Pollard	Australia	1:58.99	R, S-off
9	3	5	Sajan Prakash	India	1:58.99	R, S-off
11	1	3	Tom Beeley	Scotland	1:59.40	
12	3	2	Patrick Hussey	Canada	1:59.41	
13	1	6	Keanan Dols	Jamaica	2:01.75	
14	1	2	Isaac Dodds	Jersey	2:06.41	
15	2	2	Simon Bachmann	Seychelles	2:09.25	
16	3	7	Peter Allen	Isle of Man	2:09.37	
17	2	7	Ethan Stubbs-Green	Antigua and Barbuda	2:10.25	
18	1	7	Johnpaul Balloqui	Gibraltar	2:10.50	
19	3	1	Aidan Carroll	Gibraltar	2:12.47	
20	2	1	Mohamed Rihan Shiham	Maldives	2:37.81	

=== Swim-off ===
Rank	Lane	Name	Nationality	Time	Notes
1	5	Sajan Prakash	India	1:58.31	R
2	4	Kieren Pollard	Australia	1:58.57	R

=== Final ===
Rank	Lane	Name	Nationality	Time	Notes
1st place, gold medalist(s)	4	Lewis Clareburt	New Zealand	1:55.60	
2nd place, silver medalist(s)	5	Chad le Clos	South Africa	1:55.89	
3rd place, bronze medalist(s)	1	James Guy	England	1:56.77	
4	6	Bowen Gough	Australia	1:56.84	
5	3	Duncan Scott	Scotland	1:56.89	
6	7	Mason Wilby	England	1:57.12	
7	2	Jay Lelliott	England	1:58.13	
8	8	Brendon Smith	Australia	2:00.24	
