= 2018 Pan Pacific Swimming Championships – Men's 200 metre individual medley =

Men's 200 metre individual medley at the 2018 Pan Pacific Swimming Championships
- Venue: Tokyo Tatsumi International Swimming Center
- Dates: 11 August (heats & finals)
- Competitors: 21 from 10 nations
- Winning time: 1:55.40

Medalists
gold medal	Chase Kalisz	United States
silver medal	Mitch Larkin	Australia
bronze medal	Kosuke Hagino	Japan

The men's 200 metre individual medley competition at the 2018 Pan Pacific Swimming Championships took place on August 11 at the Tokyo Tatsumi International Swimming Center. The defending champion was Kosuke Hagino of Japan.

== Records ==
Prior to this competition, the existing world and Pan Pacific records were as follows:

World record	Ryan Lochte (USA)	1:54.00	Shanghai, China	28 July 2011
Pan Pacific Championships record	Ryan Lochte (USA)	1:54.43	Irvine, United States	21 August 2010

== Results ==
All times are in minutes and seconds.

KEY:	QA	Qualified A Final	QB	Qualified B Final	CR	Championships record	NR	National record	PB	Personal best	SB	Seasonal best

=== Heats ===
The first round was held on 11 August from 10:00.

Only two swimmers from each country may advance to the A or B final. If a country not qualify any swimmer to the A final, that same country may qualify up to three swimmers to the B final.

Rank	Name	Nationality	Time	Notes
1	Chase Kalisz	United States	1:57.07	QA
2	Kosuke Hagino	Japan	1:57.60	QA
3	Abrahm DeVine	United States	1:58.45	QA
4	Clyde Lewis	Australia	1:58.47	QA
5	Daiya Seto	Japan	1:58.50	QA
6	Hiromasa Fujimori	Japan	1:58.78	QB
7	Mitch Larkin	Australia	1:59.48	QA
8	Jay Litherland	United States	1:59.91	QB
9	Leonardo Santos	Brazil	2:00.25	QA
10	Lewis Clareburt	New Zealand	2:00.92	QA
11	Brandonn Almeida	Brazil	2:01.20	QB
12	Juran Mizohata	Japan	2:01.57	~~QB~~, WD
13	Mack Darragh	Canada	2:01.72	QB
14	Javier Acevedo	Canada	2:01.79	QB
15	Deng Ziqi	China	2:02.51	QB
16	Jonathan Gómez	Colombia	2:07.42	~~QB~~, WD
17	Lennosuke Suzuki	Northern Mariana Islands	2:27.07	QB
–	Caeleb Dressel	United States	DNS	
–	Jarod Hatch	Philippines	DNS	
–	Vinicius Lanza	Brazil	DNS	
–	Andrew Seliskar	United States	DSQ	

=== B Final ===
The B final was held on 11 August from 18:00.

Rank	Name	Nationality	Time	Notes
9	Jay Litherland	United States	1:59.88	
10	Hiromasa Fujimori	Japan	1:59.96	
11	Mack Darragh	Canada	2:00.94	
12	Brandonn Almeida	Brazil	2:01.34	
13	Deng Ziqi	China	2:04.26	
14	Lennosuke Suzuki	Northern Mariana Islands	2:25.64	
–	Javier Acevedo	Canada	DSQ	

=== A Final ===
The A final was held on 11 August from 18:00.

Rank	Name	Nationality	Time	Notes
1st place, gold medalist(s)	Chase Kalisz	United States	1:55.40	
2nd place, silver medalist(s)	Mitch Larkin	Australia	1:56.21	
3rd place, bronze medalist(s)	Kosuke Hagino	Japan	1:56.66	
4	Daiya Seto	Japan	1:57.36	
5	Abrahm DeVine	United States	1:57.81	
6	Clyde Lewis	Australia	1:58.17	
7	Leonardo Santos	Brazil	1:58.83	
8	Lewis Clareburt	New Zealand	1:59.31	
