= Laticia-Leigh Transom =

New Zealand swimmer

Personal information
- Born: 10 April 2001 (age 25) Palmerston North, New Zealand
- Height: 1.80 m (5 ft 11 in)

Sport
- Sport: Swimming
- Strokes: Freestyle
- Club: Ice Breaker Aquatics / Brisbane Grammar Swimming
- College team: University of Southern California / University of Hawaiʻi at Mānoa
- Coach: David Lush / Dave Salo / Michael Stephens / Bobby Jovanovich
Medal record
Women's swimming
Representing New Zealand
Commonwealth Youth Games
Gold medal – first place	2017 Bahamas	200m freestyle
Gold medal – first place	2017 Bahamas	4x200 m mixed freestyle
Silver medal – second place	2017 Bahamas	100m freestyle
Silver medal – second place	2017 Bahamas	4x100 m mixed medley
Bronze medal – third place	2017 Bahamas	50m freestyle

Laticia-Leigh Transon (born 10 April 2001) is a New Zealand swimmer who competed at the 2018 Commonwealth games and the 2024 Summer Olympics.

Transom was born in Palmerston North, New Zealand, and spent the first part of her life in Taihape before moving to Australia in 2006. In Australia, she attended Brisbane State High School before departing for college in the United States of America. Transom returned to Australia on completion of her time at college.

Transom (Ngāti Kahungunu, Ngāi Te Rangi, Te Āti Haunui a Pāpārangi) was named Junior Māori Sportswoman of the year in 2017.

She is the current New Zealand record holder in the short course 100 metre freestyle set in 2023 in a time of 53.13. While also was part of the women's 4x200 meter freestyle relay, women's 4x100 metre medley relay and 4x100 mixed metre freestyle relay.

== Swimming career ==
2017 Commonwealth youth games

Transom made her first national team at the 2017 Commonwealth Youth Games held in the Bahamas where she won a gold medal in the 200 metre freestyle in a time of 2:01.56 and in the 4x200 metre freestyle mixed relay (alongside Lewis Clareburt, Chelsey Edwards and Zac Reid). She claimed silver medals in the 100 metre freestyle in a time of 56.59 and the 4x100 metre mixed medley relay (alongside Clareburt, Finn Kennard Campbell and Ciara Smith) and a bronze medal in the 50 metre freestyle in a time of 26.02.

2018 Commonwealth games

A year later, Transom represented New Zealand as a sixteen year old at the 2018 Commonwealth games held on the Gold Coast, Australia. Transom had two individual races, finishing 5th in the first semi-final of the 50 metre freestyle in a time of 25.95, and placing 6th in the first semi-final of the 100 metre freestyle in a time of 56.26. She was also part of the 4x100 metre freestyle relay with Georgia Marris, Carina Doyle and Helena Gasson that finished 4th, and the 4x100 metre medley relay with Bobbi Gichard, Bronagh Ryan and Gasson that finished 6th.

2024 World championships

Transom would return to the New Zealand team in 2024 at the 2024 World Aquatics Championships held in Doha, Qatar. Transom raced in the 4x200 metre freestyle relay alongside Erika Fairweather, Eve Thomas and Caitlin Deans as they finished 5th in the final and set a new national record in a time of 7:53.02.

2024 Summer Olympics

In a repeat of the World Championships earlier in the year, Transom was part of the 4x200 metre freestyle relay team alongside Fairweather, Thomas and Deans at the 2024 Summer Olympics in Paris. The relay team finished 8th in the final in a time of 7:55.89.

College career

In 2019, Transom left Australia for the University of Southern California in the United States.

Transom enjoyed a successful college swimming career with the USC Trojans contributing to school relay records, claiming Pac-12 Championship titles (100 yard and 200 yard) and was 9x All-American. Transom was part of the 800 yard freestyle relay team that finished 3rd at the 2019 National Collegiate Athletic Association Championships and in the process set a new school record. In 2022, Transom was second in the 100 yard and 200 yard freestyle at Pac-12 Championships while recorded a 7th-place finish in the 200 yard freestyle at the 2022 NCAA Championships as well as contributed to two top ten relay finishes.

The following season, Transom switched to the University of Hawaiʻi at Mānoa after sitting out the 2020-2021 COVID season. Here she claimed a second 7th-place finish at NCAA Championships, this time in the 100 yard freestyle. She was also a CSCAA All-American (100 Free) and MPSF Women's Swimmer of the Year.

Transom graduated with a Bachelor of Psychology.
