= Swimming at the 2016 Summer Olympics – Men's 400 metre individual medley =

Men's 400 metre individual medley at the Games of the XXXI Olympiad
- Venue: Olympic Aquatics Stadium
- Dates: 6 August 2016 (heats & final)
- Competitors: 27 from 20 nations
- Winning time: 4:06.05 AS

Medalists
| 1st place, gold medalist(s) | | Kosuke Hagino | Japan |
| 2nd place, silver medalist(s) | | Chase Kalisz | United States |
| 3rd place, bronze medalist(s) | | Daiya Seto | Japan |

The men's 400 metre individual medley event at the 2016 Summer Olympics took place on 6 August at the Olympic Aquatics Stadium.

== Summary ==
London 2012 bronze medalist Kosuke Hagino held off a late challenge from the U.S. swimmer Chase Kalisz down the final stretch to touch the wall first in a new Asian record of 4:06.05. Kalisz managed to secure his first Olympic career medal with a personal best of 4:06.75 for a silver. Meanwhile, Hagino's fellow countryman and 2015 world champion Daiya Seto captured the bronze in 4:09.71, to give Japan two swimmers on the same Olympic podium for the first time in 60 years.

Great Britain's Max Litchfield finished off the podium with a fourth-place time in 4:11.62, edging out the American Jay Litherland by six-hundredths of a second (4:11.68). Australian duo Thomas Fraser-Holmes (4:11.90) and Travis Mahoney (4:15.48), as well as Spain's Joan Lluís Pons (4:16.58) closed out the field.

Germany's Jacob Heidtmann, who established a new national record of 4:11.85 to finish among the top eight for the final, was disqualified for using two dolphin kicks in the breaststroke leg during the prelims.

The medals for the competition were presented by Henri, Grand Duke of Luxembourg, IOC member, and the gifts were presented by Dr. Julio Maglione, President of the FINA.

== Records ==
Prior to this competition, the existing world and Olympic records were as follows.

| World record | Michael Phelps (USA) | 4:03.84 | Beijing, China | 10 August 2008 |
| Olympic record | Michael Phelps (USA) | 4:03.84 | Beijing, China | 10 August 2008 |

== Competition format ==
The competition consisted of two rounds: heats and a final. The swimmers with the best 8 times in the heats advanced to the final. Swim-offs were used as necessary to break ties for advancement to the next round.

== Results ==
=== Heats ===
| Rank | Heat | Lane | Name | Nationality | Time | Notes |
|---|---|---|---|---|---|---|
| 1 | 4 | 5 | Chase Kalisz | United States | 4:08.12 | Q |
| 2 | 4 | 4 | Daiya Seto | Japan | 4:08.47 | Q |
| 3 | 3 | 4 | Kosuke Hagino | Japan | 4:10.00 | Q |
| 4 | 4 | 3 | Jay Litherland | United States | 4:11.10 | Q |
| 5 | 3 | 6 | Max Litchfield | Great Britain | 4:11.95 | Q |
| 6 | 3 | 3 | Thomas Fraser-Holmes | Australia | 4:12.51 | Q |
| 7 | 2 | 4 | Travis Mahoney | Australia | 4:13.37 | Q |
| 8 | 2 | 5 | Joan Lluís Pons | Spain | 4:13.55 | Q, NR |
| 9 | 3 | 7 | Richárd Nagy | Slovakia | 4:13.87 | |
| 10 | 3 | 2 | Wang Shun | China | 4:14.46 | |
| 11 | 3 | 8 | Gergely Gyurta | Hungary | 4:14.81 | |
| 12 | 3 | 5 | Dávid Verrasztó | Hungary | 4:15.04 | |
| 13 | 2 | 8 | Jérémy Desplanches | Switzerland | 4:15.46 | |
| 14 | 2 | 1 | Alexis Santos | Portugal | 4:15.84 | |
| 15 | 4 | 7 | Brandonn Almeida | Brazil | 4:17.25 | |
| 16 | 4 | 1 | Luca Marin | Italy | 4:17.88 | |
| 17 | 2 | 3 | Michael Meyer | South Africa | 4:18.13 | |
| 18 | 3 | 1 | Johannes Hintze | Germany | 4:18.25 | |
| 19 | 2 | 6 | Gal Nevo | Israel | 4:18.29 | |
| 20 | 4 | 6 | Federico Turrini | Italy | 4:18.39 | |
| 21 | 4 | 8 | Sebastien Rousseau | South Africa | 4:18.72 | |
| 22 | 1 | 4 | Christoph Meier | Liechtenstein | 4:19.19 | |
| 23 | 2 | 7 | Raphaël Stacchiotti | Luxembourg | 4:20.37 | |
| 24 | 2 | 2 | Pavel Janeček | Czech Republic | 4:22.09 | |
| 25 | 1 | 5 | Pedro Pinotes | Angola | 4:25.84 | |
| 26 | 1 | 3 | Luis Vega Torres | Cuba | 4:27.27 | |
| | 4 | 2 | Jacob Heidtmann | Germany | DSQ | |

=== Final ===
| Rank | Lane | Name | Nationality | Time | Notes |
|---|---|---|---|---|---|
| 1st place, gold medalist(s) | 3 | Kosuke Hagino | Japan | 4:06.05 | AS |
| 2nd place, silver medalist(s) | 4 | Chase Kalisz | United States | 4:06.75 | |
| 3rd place, bronze medalist(s) | 5 | Daiya Seto | Japan | 4:09.71 | |
| 4 | 2 | Max Litchfield | Great Britain | 4:11.62 | |
| 5 | 6 | Jay Litherland | United States | 4:11.68 | |
| 6 | 7 | Thomas Fraser-Holmes | Australia | 4:11.90 | |
| 7 | 1 | Travis Mahoney | Australia | 4:15.48 | |
| 8 | 8 | Joan Lluís Pons | Spain | 4:16.58 | |
