= 2018 FINA World Swimming Championships (25 m) – Men's 400 metre individual medley =

Men's 400 metre individual medley at the 2018 FINA World Swimming Championships (25 m)
- Venue: Hangzhou Sports Park Stadium
- Dates: 15 December (heats and final)
- Competitors: 35
- Winning time: 3:56.43

Medalists
gold medal	Daiya Seto	Japan
silver medal	Thomas Fraser-Holmes	Australia
bronze medal	Brandonn Almeida	Brazil

The Men's 400 metre individual medley competition of the 2018 FINA World Swimming Championships (25 m) was held on 15 December 2018.

== Records ==
Prior to the competition, the existing world and championship records were as follows.

	Name	Nation	Time	Location	Date
World record Championship record	Ryan Lochte	United States	3:55.50	Dubai	16 December 2010

== Results ==
=== Heats ===
The heats were started at 9:56.

Rank	Heat	Lane	Name	Nationality	Time	Notes
1	4	5	Daiya Seto	Japan	4:00.50	Q
2	3	2	Brandonn Almeida	Brazil	4:04.58	Q
3	2	3	Tomas Peribonio	Ecuador	4:05.08	Q, NR
3	4	3	Thomas Fraser-Holmes	Australia	4:05.08	Q
5	4	6	Tomoya Takeuchi	Japan	4:05.21	Q
6	4	4	Péter Bernek	Hungary	4:05.49	Q
7	3	5	Gergely Gyurta	Hungary	4:06.13	Q
8	3	8	João Vital	Portugal	4:06.93	Q
9	4	9	Richard Nagy	Slovakia	4:07.91	
10	4	1	Joan Lluís Pons	Spain	4:08.33	
11	3	6	David Schlicht	Australia	4:08.41	
12	4	7	Marc Sánchez	Spain	4:08.51	
13	2	6	Kieran Smith	United States	4:08.52	
14	2	2	Mark Szaranek	United Kingdom	4:08.86	
15	4	2	Leonardo Coelho Santos	Brazil	4:08.93	
16	3	3	Daniil Pasynkov	Russia	4:09.19	
17	2	7	Jarod Arroyo	Puerto Rico	4:10.40	
18	3	0	Patrick Staber	Austria	4:11.05	
19	3	9	Wang Hsing-Hao	Chinese Taipei	4:11.22	
20	3	7	Wang Yizhe	China	4:11.64	
21	4	8	Tomoe Hvas	Norway	4:12.56	
22	4	0	Ayrton Sweeney	South Africa	4:13.21	
23	2	4	Wilrich Coetzee	New Zealand	4:13.81	
24	3	1	Adam Paulsson	Sweden	4:14.16	
25	2	5	Svetlozar Nikolov	Bulgaria	4:14.25	
26	1	5	Brandon Schuster	Samoa	4:17.20	
27	2	8	Hưng Nguyên Tran	Vietnam	4:17.92	
28	2	0	Luis Vega Torres	Cuba	4:19.27	NR
29	2	9	Erick Gordillo	Guatemala	4:21.02	
30	1	3	Munzer Kabbara	Lebanon	4:21.59	NR
31	1	2	Nichita Bortnicov	Moldova	4:23.08	
32	1	4	Malcolm Low	Singapore	4:25.31	
33	2	1	Alberto Batungbacal	Philippines	4:25.90	
34	1	6	Mathieu Marquet	Mauritius	4:33.24	
	3	4	Wang Shun	China	DNS	WD

=== Final ===
The final was held on 15 December at 20:22.

Rank	Lane	Name	Nationality	Time	Notes
1st place, gold medalist(s)	4	Daiya Seto	Japan	3:56.43	
2nd place, silver medalist(s)	6	Thomas Fraser-Holmes	Australia	4:02.74	
3rd place, bronze medalist(s)	5	Brandonn Almeida	Brazil	4:03.71	
4	7	Péter Bernek	Hungary	4:04.71	
5	1	Gergely Gyurta	Hungary	4:04.74	
6	3	Tomas Peribonio	Ecuador	4:06.26	
7	2	Tomoya Takeuchi	Japan	4:06.99	
8	8	João Vital	Portugal	4:07.69	
