= 2017 USA Swimming Championships =

American swimming tournament

The 2017 Phillips 66 National Swimming Championships were held from June 27 to July 1, 2017, at the IU Natatorium in Indianapolis, Indiana.

== Men's events ==
Event	Gold		Silver		Bronze	
50 m freestyle	Caeleb Dressel	21.53	Nathan Adrian	21.87	Cullen Jones	21.89
100 m freestyle	Nathan Adrian	47.96	Caeleb Dressel	47.97	Townley Haas	48.20
200 m freestyle	Townley Haas	1:45.03	Blake Pieroni	1:46.30	Zane Grothe	1:46.39
400 m freestyle	Zane Grothe	3:44.43	Clark Smith	3:45.91	Townley Haas	3:46.41
800 m freestyle	Clark Smith	7:50.43	Zane Grothe	7:50.97	True Sweetser	7:55.29
1500 m freestyle	True Sweetser	14:59.73	Robert Finke	15:01.31	PJ Ransford	15:01.82
50 m backstroke	Justin Ress	24.41	Ryan Murphy	24.64	Matt Grevers	24.67
100 m backstroke	Matt Grevers	52.71	Ryan Murphy	53.02	Justin Ress	53.38
200 m backstroke	Ryan Murphy	1:54.30	Jacob Pebley	1:54.78	Robert Owen	1:57.17
50 m breaststroke	Kevin Cordes	26.88	Andrew Wilson	27.18	Cody Miller	27.24
100 m breaststroke	Kevin Cordes	58.74	Cody Miller	59.11	Nicolas Fink	59.40
200 m breaststroke	Kevin Cordes	2:07.41	Nicolas Fink	2:08.63	Josh Prenot	2:08.72
50 m butterfly	Caeleb Dressel	23.05	Cullen Jones	23.27	Tim Phillips	23.37
100 m butterfly	Caeleb Dressel	50.87	Tim Phillips	51.30	Jack Conger	51.33
200 m butterfly	Jack Conger	1:54.47	Pace Clark	1:54.58	Chase Kalisz	1:54.79
200 m IM	Chase Kalisz	1:56.51	Abrahm Devine	1:56.79	Josh Prenot	1:57.14
400 m IM	Chase Kalisz	4:06.99	Jay Litherland	4:09.31	Gunnar Bentz	4:11.66

== Women's events ==
Event	Gold		Silver		Bronze	
50 m freestyle	Simone Manuel	24.27	Abbey Weitzeil	24.74	Lia Neal	24.77
100 m freestyle	Mallory Comerford	52.81	Simone Manuel	53.05	Lia Neal	53.59
200 m freestyle	Katie Ledecky	1:54.84	Leah Smith	1:56.68	Melanie Margalis	1:56.90
400 m freestyle	Katie Ledecky	3:58.44	Leah Smith	4:03.77	Sierra Schmidt	4:07.92
800 m freestyle	Katie Ledecky	8:11.50	Leah Smith	8:20.46	Hannah Moore	8:27.58
1500 m freestyle	Leah Smith	16:01.02	Hannah Moore	16:08.68	Ashley Twichell	16:10.63
50 m backstroke	Hannah Stevens	27.63	Kathleen Baker	27.69	Ali Deloof	27.89
100 m backstroke	Kathleen Baker	58.57	Olivia Smoliga	59.17	Hannah Stevens	59.74
200 m backstroke	Kathleen Baker	2:06.38	Regan Smith	2:08.55	Asia Seidt	2:08.99
50 m breaststroke	Lilly King	29.66	Katie Meili	30.11	Molly Hannis	30.24
100 m breaststroke	Lilly King	1:04.95	Katie Meili	1:05.51	Bethany Galat	1:06.72
200 m breaststroke	Lilly King	2:21.83	Bethany Galat	2:22.24	Miranda Tucker	2:25.82
50 m butterfly	Kelsi Worrell	25.69	Hellen Moffitt	26.19	Kendyl Stewart	26.24
100 m butterfly	Kelsi Worrell	57.38	Sarah Gibson	57.96	Mallory Comerford	57.97
200 m butterfly	Hali Flickinger	2:07.60	Dakota Luther	2:08.71	Sarah Gibson	2:08.75
200 m IM	Melanie Margalis	2:09.57	Madisyn Cox	2:09.69	Ella Eastin	2:10.89
400 m IM	Leah Smith	4:33.86	Elizabeth Beisel	4:38.55	Brooke Forde	4:39.19
