= Alicia Wilson (swimmer) =

British swimmer (born 2000)

Personal information
- Nationality: British
- Born: 5 March 2000 (age 26) Guildford, Surrey, England

Sport
- Sport: Swimming
- College team: Cal
Medal record
Representing Great Britain
World University Games
Gold medal – first place	2019 Naples	200 m medley
European Junior Championships
Bronze medal – third place	2017 Netanya	200 m medley
Representing England
Commonwealth Games
Bronze medal – third place	2022 Birmingham	4×100 m mixed medley
Commonwealth Youth Games
Gold medal – first place	2017 Nassau	200 m medley
Silver medal – second place	2017 Nassau	100 m butterfly
Silver medal – second place	2017 Nassau	4×100 m mixed freestyle
Bronze medal – third place	2017 Nassau	4×100 m mixed medley
Representing the California Golden Bears
NCAA Championships
Bronze medal – third place	2021 Greensboro	200 y medley
Bronze medal – third place	2021 Greensboro	4×200 y freestyle

Alicia Wilson (born 5 March 2000) is a British swimmer. She competed in the women's 100 metre backstroke event at the 2020 European Aquatics Championships, in Budapest, Hungary.

Wilson was named as a member of the British team to go to the postponed 2020 Olympics in April 2021. This would be her first Olympics where she would join an "exceptionally high quality team" including more experienced Olympians. She got through the heats and semi finals to make the Olympic final in the 200m Individual Medley.
