= Michael Bohl =

Australian swimmer and coach

Michael Shayne Bohl is an Australian swimming coach, working for the Australian Swim Team and Griffith University.

Bohl is the coach of swimmer Emma McKeon, who represented Australia in the 2016 Summer Olympics and the 2020 Summer Olympics, and former coach of triple Olympic gold medallist Stephanie Rice.

Bohl has been the coach of Australian swimmers who have been on the podium at every summer Olympics between the 2008 Summer Olympics and the 2024 Summer Olympics.

Bohl received the Australian Sports Medal in 2000, recognising him as a "Long Serving ASI Committee Member". He was awarded the Medal of the Order of Australia in the 2010 Australian Day Honours for "service to swimming as a competitor and coach".

At the 2015 Australian Institute of Sport Awards Bohl was named Coach of the Year.

In 2020, Bohl started co-coaching Australian competitive swimmer and multiple-time world junior champion Lani Pallister with Janelle Pallister.

For the 2021 year, Bohl was the recipient of the "Coach of the Best Female Swimmer" from FINA, an award presented in conjunction with the FINA Athletes of the Year awards, for being the coach of the "Best Female Swimmer" award recipient, Emma McKeon. He also received the "Olympic Program Coach of the Year" award from Swimming Australia for the year.

In 2022, Brendon Smith, an Olympic bronze medalist from the 2020 Summer Olympic Games, started training at Griffith University with Bohl as his coach.
