= New Jersey Swimming =

New Jersey Swimming (NJ) is the Local Swimming Committee (LSC) (governing body) for competitive swimming in the central and northern New Jersey area. They are a member of USA Swimming and the Eastern Zone. Most of the athletes who compete in NJ-sponsored swim meets are youths under the age of 18.

== Governing areas ==
NJ is one of the 59 LSCs of USA Swimming. NJ covers the 13 counties north of, and including, Mercer and Monmouth county. All of NJ lies within the state of New Jersey.

== Clubs ==
There are over 60 clubs registered in the NJ LSC, with new teams being added yearly. Teams include:

- ACE Swim Team
- APEX Predators
- Berkeley Aquatic Club
- Bergen Barracuda Swim Club
- Brigantine Green Heads Swim Team
- BJCC Bridgewater Tide
- Cougar Aquatic Team
- Clifton Boys and Girls Club
- Central Jersey Aquatic Club
- Deep End Aquatics Swim Club
- Eagle Aquatic Club
- Eastern Express Swim Team
- Elite Swim Club
- Fanwood Scotch Plains YMCA
- Greater Morristown YMCA
- Greater Somerset County YMCA
- Highlander Aquatic Club
- Hamilton Y Aquatic Club
- Hunterdon County YMCA
- Healthquest Hammerheads
- Jersey City Bolts
- Jersey Flyers Aquatic Club
- Jersey Gator Swim Club
- Lakeland hills Family YMCA
- Madison Area YMCA Mariners
- Metro Area Life Time
- Monmouth Barracudas
- Morris County Swim Club
- Morris Center YMCA
- Metuchen-Edison YMCA
- Montclair YMCA Dolphins
- New Jersey Bluestreaks
- New Jersey Race Club
- New Jersey Wave Swim Team
- Newark Piranhas
- North Jersey Barracudas
- Ocean County YMCA Tigersharks
- Peddie Aquatic Association
- Pennington Aquatic
- Pioneer Aquatic Club INC.
- Pirate Swim Club
- Princeton Piranhas Swim Team
- Princeton Tigers Aquatic Club
- Red Bank YMCA
- Red Hawk Swim Club
- Raritan Valley YMCA
- Rough Rider Aquatic Club
- Ridgewood YMCA Breakers
- Rutgers University Swimming
- Scarlet Aquatics
- Sino-US Warriors Aquatic Club
- Streamline Aquatics Club
- Summit Area YMCA Seals
- Seton Hall University Swimming
- Sussex County YMCA
- Skyy Swim Team
- Stevens Sharks
- The Atlantic Club
- The Tidal Wave Swim Team
- West Essex YMCA
- Wave Runners
- Water Warriors Aquatic Team
- Wyckoff YMCA
- Whitewater Swimming
- Westfield YMCA
- X-Cel Swimming
- YMCA of the Jersey Shore
- YMCA of Western Monmouth County

== Governance ==
The New Jersey LSC is run by its board of directors, elected by the House of Delegates.

== Notable people ==
- David Curtiss (born 2002), competitive swimmer, Hamilton Y Aquatic Club, national YMCA record setter in the 50-yard freestyle, 2019 World Junior Championships silver medalist in an individual event (50-meter freestyle), 2023 NCAA Division I Champion in the 4×50-yard medley relay.
- Jack Alexy (born 2003), competitive swimmer, swam for Greater Somerset County YMCA, Broke 17-18 National Age Group Record for 100-Meter freestyle. Now swimmer of University of California Berkeley
