= David Curtiss (swimmer) =

American swimmer (born 2002)

Personal information
- Full name: David Avery Curtiss
- National team: United States
- Born: July 4, 2002 (age 24) Yardley, Pennsylvania, United States
- Website: https://www.davidcurtiss.org

Sport
- Sport: Swimming
- Strokes: Freestyle
- Club: Hamilton Y (former)
- College team: North Carolina State University (Former)
- Coach: Sue Welsh (former)
Medal record
Men's swimming
Representing the United States
Event	1st	2nd	3rd
World Championships (SC)	0	0	1
Pan American Games	1	0	0
World Junior Championships	0	1	0
Total	1	1	1
World Championships (SC)
Bronze medal – third place	2022 Melbourne	4×100 m freestyle
World Junior Championships
Silver medal – second place	2019 Budapest	50 m freestyle
Pan American Games
Gold medal – first place	2023 Santiago	50 m freestyle
Representing the NC State Wolfpack
Event	1st	2nd	3rd
NCAA Championships	1	0	2
Total	1	0	2
By race
Event	1st	2nd	3rd
4×50 y medley	1	0	1
4×50 y freestyle	0	0	1
Total	1	0	2
NCAA Championships
Gold medal – first place	2023 Minneapolis	4×50 y medley
Bronze medal – third place	2022 Atlanta	4×50 y medley
Bronze medal – third place	2023 Minneapolis	4×50 y freestyle

David Avery Curtiss (born July 4, 2002) is an American former professional swimmer. He is a US Open record holder in the 4×50-yard medley relay. At the 2019 World Junior Championships, he won the silver medal in the 50-meter freestyle. In 2021, he set a new American high school record in the 50-yard freestyle for all high school swimming, public and private, in the United States. At the 2022 World Short Course Championships, he competed in three freestyle relay events and the 50-meter freestyle, winning a bronze medal in the 4×100-meter freestyle relay. He is a 2023 NCAA Division I champion in the 4×50-yard medley relay.

== Early life and education ==
Curtiss was born on the 4th of July, 2002 in Yardley, Pennsylvania. Growing up, he swam competitively for the Hamilton Y Aquatic Club in Hamilton, New Jersey where he was coached by Sue Welsh. He attended The Pennington School, also called Pennington High School, in Pennington, New Jersey for high school where he competed on the school's swim team. For collegiate swimming, Curtiss started competing for North Carolina State University in fall of 2021. For his academic study, Curtiss decided to take Arabic as a foreign language, major in criminology, and minor in psychology.

== Career ==
=== 2014–2016 ===
At the age of 11, Curtiss caught the attention of SwimSwam who named him one of the "Weekly Wonders of Age Group Swimming" for his time of a 27.95 in the 50-freestyle, which was almost three seconds faster than his time from the year before. He received the honor twice more, once in 2015 and once in 2016, both times for his performances in the 50-yard freestyle, 100-yard freestyle, and 100-yard backstroke.

=== 2018–2020 ===
In April 2018, Curtiss swam a personal best time in the 50-yard freestyle with a time of 19.75. His time made him the fifth fastest American swimmer in US history in the event for boys in the 15–16 age group, ranking him behind fastest swimmer Michael Andrew and ahead of sixth fastest swimmer Caeleb Dressel. He competed in three individual events at the 2019 National Championships in Stanford, California in July and August 2019. In the 50-meter freestyle he ranked 5th with a time of 22.25, in the 100-meter backstroke he ranked 91st with a 59.54, and in the 100-meter freestyle he swam a 51.49 and placed 94th overall.

==== 2019 World Junior Championships ====
2019 World Junior Championships
Silver medal – second place	50 m freestyle	22.14

At the 2019 World Junior Championships held in August 2019 in Budapest, Hungary, Curtiss competed representing the United States of America. In the semifinals of the 50-meter freestyle he swam a 21.95, advancing to the final and becoming the third fastest American swimmer in the 17–18 age group for the event behind Caeleb Dressel and Michael Andrew. Curtiss finished second in the 50-meter freestyle with a time of 22.14, winning the silver medal in the event. Later on, in September, Curtiss was one of six men named to the US National Team for their times earlier in the 2019 year in the 50-freestyle along with Nathan Adrian, Michael Andrew, Michael Chadwick, Caeleb Dressel, and Ryan Held. His time of 21.95 seconds from the semifinals tied for fifth amongst men on the roster for the 2020–2021 US national team in the 50-meter freestyle.

==== 2020 High school swim season ====
In February 2020, Curtiss swam a 19.42 in the 50-yard freestyle for his high school team. His time broke the national independent (private) school record of 19.54 set by Ryan Murphy in 2012 and moved the national independent high school record closer to the national public high school record of 19.29 set by Caeleb Dressel.

=== 2021 ===
==== 2021 TYR Pro Swim Series – Richmond ====
Leading up to the US Olympic Trials, where swimmers competed for a spot on the US Olympic Team at the 2020 Summer Olympics, Curtiss swam a personal best time of 21.87 in the prelims of the 50-meter freestyle at the 2021 TYR Pro Swim Series meet in Richmond, Virginia, which was the 5th fastest time in the world in January 2021. He also swam a 51.14 in the 100-meter freestyle.

==== 2021 High school swim season ====
SwimSwam official video: Curtiss swims 19.11 50yd freestyle in high school

In February 2021, Curtiss swam a 19.77 in the 50-yard freestyle at a dual meet for his high school, capturing the attention of Swimming World who took note of it being a fast time for so early in the swim season. On March 3, 2021, at a dual meet, Curtiss swam a 19.26 in the 50-yard freestyle breaking the national independent high school record he set at 19.42 the year before. This moved him closer to the national high school secord, for both public and private high schools in the United States, of 19.20 set one week before Curtiss' swim. Three days later, Curtiss swam a 19.11, which made him the fastest swimmer in the 50-yard freestyle in the history of American high school swimming, and switched the ownership of the national high school record in the event from a public high school swimmer to a private high school swimmer.

==== 2021 YMCA National Festival ====
At the virtual 2021 YMCA National Festival Championships meet held in March and April 2021, Curtiss swam personal bests and set new club records in five individual events for the Hamilton Y Aquatic Club including the 50-yard freestyle, 100-yard freestyle, 200-yard freestyle, 100-yard breaststroke, and 100-yard butterfly. His new club record of 19.33 seconds in the 50-yard freestyle was also a new national YMCA record in the event.

==== 2020 US Olympic Trials ====
The 2020 US Olympic Trials were Curtiss' first Olympic Trials. Curtiss competed in the 50-meter freestyle at the 2020 USA Swimming Olympic Trials in Omaha, Nebraska, which were postponed to June 2021 due to the COVID-19 pandemic. On June 19, 2021, Curtiss swam a 22.34 in the prelims, ranking 13th overall and advancing to the semifinals later the same day. In the semifinals, Curtiss ranked 8th with a time of 22.07 and advanced to the final. The next day, June 20, 2021, Curtiss finished 6th in the final with a time of 22.12 and did not make the US Olympic Team for the 2020 Summer Olympics in Tokyo, Japan. Following his performances, Curtiss expressed he was not discouraged with his outcome at the meet, missing the 2020 US Olympic swim team, and was instead focusing his sights and energy on the 2024 Summer Olympics and his collegiate swimming career.

==== National Team as part of the pack ====
His swims in the 50-meter freestyle leading up to and at the 2020 Olympic Trials were fast enough to earn him a spot on the 2021—2022 US National Team in the event. Curtiss was one of six current NC State Wolfpack student athletes in swimming to be named to the year's national team. Soon after, in October 2021 during his first season swimming for the Wolfpack, Curtiss placed second in the 50-yard freestyle with a time of 19.74 seconds in a dual meet against the Tennessee Volunteers. On the first day of competition at the 2021 North Carolina State Invitational, November 18, Curtiss ranked fourth in the prelims heats of the 50-yard freestyle with a time of 19.55 seconds, which was over four tenths of a second behind first-ranked Andrey Minakov of Stanford who finished in 19.13 seconds. Later in the day Curtiss swam a 19.54 in the finals, placing seventh overall.

=== 2022 ===
==== 2022 ACC Championships ====
In the prelims heats of the 50-yard freestyle on day two of the 2022 Atlantic Coast Conference Championships in February 2022, Curtiss swam a personal best time of 18.77 seconds and ranked first heading into the final. Curtiss's time ranked him as the fourth-fastest male freshman in the 50-yard freestyle in the history of the NCAA, just 0.10 seconds behind first-ranked male freshman Caeleb Dressel who swam a 18.67 in 2015. He followed up his 18.77 with a 18.79 lead-off leg on the 4×50-yard freestyle relay, to contribute to a final relay time of 1:14.59 and second-place finish, as well as a new personal best time of 18.74 seconds and a first-place finish in the 50-yard freestyle final. Day three of competition, Curtiss false started as part of the 4×50-yard medley relay in the final and the relay was disqualified. In the prelims heats of the 100-yard freestyle on day five of five days of competition, Curtiss swam a 42.88 to qualify for the b-final ranking 13th across all prelims heats and decided not to swim in the finals heats.

==== 2022 NCAA Championships ====
2022 NCAA Championships
Bronze medal – third place	4×50 yd medley	1:21.69

For his first event of the 2022 NCAA Division I Championships in Atlanta in March, Curtiss helped achieved a third-place finish as part of the NC State Wolfpack 4×50-yard medley relay in 1:21.69, splitting a 18.76 for the freestyle leg of the relay. For the prelims heats of the 50-yard freestyle the following morning, he ranked 15th overall with a time of 19.12 seconds and qualified for the b-final in the evening. He placed seventh in the b-final, fifteenth overall, with a time of 19.22 seconds. He swam a 42.70 in the 100-yard freestyle on the fourth and final day, placing 39th.

Curtiss followed up his NCAA Championships performances by competing at the 2022 Pro Swim Series held at Northside Swim Center in San Antonio, Texas, where he qualified for the final of the 50-meter freestyle on day three with a time of 22.13 seconds in the prelims heats that ranked him first heading into the final. In the final, he placed third with a time of 21.93 seconds. In the prelims heats of the 100-meter freestyle on the final day, he dropped over five-tenths of a second off his personal best time, swimming a 50.57 to qualify for the c-final ranking 20th overall and after which he decided to scratch and not compete in the c-final.

==== 2022 International Team Trials ====
At the 2022 US International Team Trials in Greensboro, North Carolina in late April, Curtiss swam a 21.99 in the prelims heats of the 50-meter freestyle on the fifth and final day of competition, advancing to the evening final ranking fifth. He tied Hunter Armstrong in the final, both finishing at the same time for fifth-place in a time of 22.00 seconds. A little over a month later, at the 2022 Pro Swim Series in Mission Viejo, California, he swam a personal best time in the preliminaries of the 50-metre freestyle, advancing to the final ranking first with his time of 21.76 seconds. He won the final with a time of 21.80 seconds, finishing over two-tenths of a second ahead of second-place finisher Ryan Held. In July, he was named to the roster for the United States team for the 2022 Duel in the Pool. At the competition, he helped win the first relay at a Duel in the Pool composed of both para-athletes and able-bodied athletes, swimming the anchor leg of the relay, and won the 50-meter freestyle, contributing to a victory for the United States over Australia with a final score of 309-284.

==== 2022 U.S. Open Championships ====
Day two of the 2022 U.S. Open Swimming Championships, held in Greensboro, Curtiss ranked first in the morning preliminary heats of the 50-meter freestyle with a time of 22.07 seconds, qualifying for the final. He won the gold medal in the evening with a time of 21.92 seconds, finishing 0.07 seconds ahead of silver medalist Joshua Liendo.

==== 2022 World Short Course Championships ====
2022 World Championships (SC)
Bronze medal – third place	4×100 m freestyle	3:05.09 (h)

On October 19, Curtiss was named to his first senior international championships team roster with a spot in the 50-meter freestyle for the 2022 World Short Course Championships, held starting December 13, in Melbourne, Australia. Day one, he led-off the 4×100-meter freestyle relay with a personal best time of 48.07 to help advance the relay to the final ranking third across all prelims heats. He won a bronze medal for his contributions when the finals relay, on which Drew Kibler took his place as the relay lead-off, placed third in a time of 3:05.09. Contributing a lead-off and personal best time of 21.34 for the 4×50-meter freestyle relay in the preliminaries on day three, he helped advance the relay to the final ranked second. Lowering his personal best to a 21.16 for the first leg of the relay in the final, he helped place fifth in 1:24.03. The fourth day, he placed twenty-fourth in the 50-meter freestyle with a time of 21.40 seconds. In the final of the 4×50-meter mixed freestyle relay later in the day, he split a 20.89 for the second leg of the relay to help place fourth in 1:29.18.

=== 2023 ===
At the first stop of the 2023 TYR Pro Swim Series, in Knoxville, Tennessee, Curtiss won the 50-meter freestyle with a time of 21.97 seconds, finishing as the only swimmer under 22.00 seconds. In his other events, he won the c-final of the 50-meter butterfly with a time of 24.51 seconds and placed twenty-seventh in the 100-meter freestyle with a time of 51.12 seconds and sixty-first in the 100-meter butterfly with a 58.01.

==== 2023 ACC Championships ====
On day one of the 2023 Atlantic Coast Conference Championships in February, Curtiss anchored the 4×50-yard medley relay to a conference title with a split time of 18.76 seconds, helping achieve a final mark of 1:22.25. The second evening, he started off by helping achieve a conference title in the 4×50-yard freestyle relay with a time of 1:15.10, swimming the lead-off leg of the relay in 18.99 seconds. He concluded the session with a fourth-place finish in the 50-yard freestyle, finishing in a time of 18.99 seconds. The following morning, he placed thirty-first in the preliminaries of the 100-yard butterfly with a personal best time of 47.91 seconds. For his third individual event, the 100-yard freestyle, he tied for sixth-place in the final on day five with a personal best time of 42.44 seconds. Following his individual performance, he swam a 42.09 for the third leg of the 4×100-yard freestyle relay to help win the conference title with a time of 2:47.32. His performances contributed to the NC State Wolfpack winning the men's team overall conference title.

==== 2023 NCAA Championships ====
2023 NCAA Championships
Gold medal – first place	4×50 yd medley	1:20.67 (CR)
Bronze medal – third place	4×50 yd freestyle	1:14.44

At the 2023 NCAA Division I Championships the following month, Curtiss split a 18.21 for the freestyle leg of the 4×50-yard medley relay on day one to help win the NCAA title in a US Open, NCAA, and Championships record time of 1:20.67 with relay teammates Kacper Stokowski (backstroke), Mason Hunter (breaststroke), and Nyls Korstanje (butterfly). On Day Two, Curtiss qualified for the B Final in the 50 yard freestyle. He placed 14th with a time of 19.10 in the final later that evening. Finishing the day's finals session in the 4×50-yard freestyle relay, he won a bronze medal, splitting a 18.67 for the fourth leg of the relay to contribute to an Atlantic Coast Conference record of 1:14.44. On the fourth and final day, he placed 48th overall in his second individual event, the 100-yard freestyle, with a time of 43.12 seconds in the preliminaries.

==== Decision to Leave NC State ====
On September 2, 2023 Curtiss took to social media to announce that he was leaving NC State: "Recent life has brought to me some tough decisions, many of which have been very difficult. This one being the most challenging; I am leaving NC State Swimming and Diving. NC State has provided me with many positive things, life altering tools that have changed me for the better. The staff taught me how to be a teammate, how to be strong, and how to approach life. Everything this coaching staff has provided for me was a true blessing, and I thank them for that,” David Curtiss posted on Instagram. “To our men’s team, thank you. Thank you for challenging me even though I’m stubborn (@luke_miller_87 ❤️). Thank you for showing me what a true 100% looks like. Thank you for mentoring me in tough times and in good times, teaching me valuable life lessons. I will bring the wisdom and pride of the Wolfpack with me everyday."

=== 2024 ===
==== 2024 US Olympic Trials ====
Curtiss was entered in the 50 meter freestyle at the 2024 USA Swimming Olympic Trials. He placed in 16th place after posting a time of 22.35 in the semi-finals.

== International championships (50 m) ==
Meet	50 freestyle
WJC 2019 (age: 17)	(silver) (22.14)

== International championships (25 m) ==
Meet	50 freestyle	4×50 freestyle	4×100 freestyle	4×50 mixed freestyle
WC 2022 (age: 20)	24th (21.40)	5th (split 21.34, 1st leg)	(bronze) ^{[a]} (split 48.07, 1st leg)	4th (split 20.89, 2nd leg)

^{a} Curtiss swam only in the preliminary heats.

== Personal best times ==
=== Long course meters (50 m pool) ===
Event	Time		Meet	Location	Date	Ref
50 m freestyle	21.76	h	2022 TYR Pro Swim Series – Mission Viejo	Mission Viejo, California	June 4, 2022	
100 m freestyle	50.57	h	2022 TYR Pro Swim Series – San Antonio	San Antonio, Texas	April 2, 2022	
100 m backstroke	59.54		2019 National Championships	Stanford, California	August 3, 2019	

Legend: h — preliminary heat

=== Short course meters (25 m pool) ===
Event	Time		Meet	Location	Date	Ref
50 m freestyle	21.16	r	2022 World Short Course Championships	Melbourne, Australia	December 15, 2022	
100 m freestyle	48.07	h, r	2022 World Short Course Championships	Melbourne, Australia	December 13, 2022	

Legend: h — preliminary heat; r — relay first leg

=== Short course yards (25 yd pool) ===
Event	Time		Meet	Location	Date	Ref
50 yd freestyle	18.74		2022 Atlantic Coast Conference Championships	Atlanta, Georgia	February 16, 2022	
100 yd freestyle	42.44		2023 Atlantic Coast Conference Championships	Greensboro, North Carolina	February 18, 2023	
200 yd freestyle	1:38.71		2021 YMCA National Festival	Voorhees, New Jersey	April 10, 2021	
100 yd backstroke	48.01		2022 NC State vs. Duke Dual Meet	Raleigh, North Carolina	January 14, 2022	
100 yd breaststroke	57.00		2021 YMCA National Festival	Voorhees, New Jersey	April 10, 2021	
100 yd butterfly	47.91	h	2023 Atlantic Coast Conference Championships	Greensboro, North Carolina	February 16, 2023	

Legend: h — preliminary heat

== Records ==
=== US Open records (short course yards) ===
No.	Event	Time	Meet	Location	Date	Ref
1	4×50 yd medley relay	1:20.67	2023 NCAA Division I Championships	Minneapolis, Minnesota	March 22, 2023	

=== National high school records (short course yards) ===
No.	Event	Time	Meet	Location	Date	Type	Ref
1	50 yd freestyle	19.42	2020 Easterns Interscholastic Championships	Lancaster, Pennsylvania	February 14, 2020	Independent	
2	50 yd freestyle (2)	19.26	Wilberforce School v. The Pennington School Dual Meet	United States	March 3, 2021	Independent	
3	50 yd freestyle (3)	19.11	Phillips Exeter Academy v. The Pennington School Dual Meet	United States	March 6, 2021	Overall, Independent	

Legend: Overall – National High School record; Independent – National Independent (Private) High School record

== Highlights ==
- 2019 World Junior Championships silver medalist: 50-meter freestyle.
- USA National Team Member, 50-freestyle: 2019—2020, 2020—2021, 2021—2022.
- US national independent (private) high school record breaker in 2020: 19.42 in 50-yard freestyle swimming for The Pennington School.
- 2x US national independent (private) high school record breaker in 2021: 19.26 in 50-yard freestyle swimming for The Pennington School, 19.11 in 50-yard freestyle swimming for The Pennington School.
- American Overall National High School (public and private) record breaker in 2021: 19.11 in 50-yard freestyle swimming for The Pennington School.
- July 2021: Officially partnered with Speedo.
- 2022 Atlantic Coast Conference title: 50-yard freestyle.
- 2022 Duel in the Pool Team USA roster member.
- 2022 World Short Course Championships first-time senior World Championships Team USA roster member and bronze medalist.
- 2022 U.S Open Championships gold medalist: 50-meter freestyle.
- 2023 Atlantic Coast Conference titles: 4×50-yard freestyle relay, 4×100-yard freestyle relay, 4×50-yard medley relay.
- 2023 NCAA Division I title: 4×50-yard medley relay.

== Awards and honors ==
- Atlantic Coast Conference, Swimmer of the Week (men's): January 24, 2023
- Times of Trenton, Swimmer of the Year (boys): 2019, 2020, 2021
- SwimSwam, Weekly Wonders of Age Group Swimming: June 18, 2014; March 13—15, 2015; January 8—10, 2016

== Personal ==
=== Role models ===
One of the swimmers who Curtiss has shared inspires him is Cullen Jones, a fellow African-American swimmer for the United States and an Olympic gold medalist in freestyle.

=== Sponsorships ===
Under a change of rules from the NCAA, that is changes to the name, image, and likeness (NIL) ruleset, in 2021, Curtiss partnered with Speedo to collaborate and monetize his performance throughout his collegiate swimming career. Concerning turning professional and his goals for the sport of swimming, Curtiss said, "There are tons of stereotypes regarding who can and can't swim. I strive to prove these wrong. I #MakeWaves by helping myself achieve my goals while helping others achieve theirs by assisting them any way I can. Swimming is for anyone, regardless of color, race, sexuality or ethnicity."

== See also ==
- List of people from Pennsylvania
- New Jersey Swimming
