= Brandonn Almeida =

Brazilian swimmer (born 1997)

Personal information
- Full name: Brandonn Pierry Cruz de Almeida
- Nationality: Brazil
- Born: 16 March 1997 (age 29) São Paulo, São Paulo, Brazil
- Height: 1.86 m (6 ft 1 in)
- Weight: 73 kg (161 lb)

Sport
- Sport: Swimming
- Strokes: Medley, Freestyle
- College team: University of South Carolina
Medal record
Men's swimming
Representing Brazil
World Championships (SC)
Bronze medal – third place	2018 Hangzhou	400 m medley
Pan American Games
Gold medal – first place	2015 Toronto	400 m medley
Bronze medal – third place	2015 Toronto	1500 m freestyle
Bronze medal – third place	2019 Lima	400 m medley
Bronze medal – third place	2023 Santiago	400 m medley
South American Games
Gold medal – first place	2022 Asunción	400 m medley
World Junior Championships
Gold medal – first place	2015 Singapore	1500 m freestyle
Silver medal – second place	2015 Singapore	400 m medley
South American Championships
Gold medal – first place	2016 Asunción	400 m medley
Gold medal – first place	2016 Asunción	4×200 m freestyle

Brandonn Pierry Cruz de Almeida (born 16 March 1997 in São Paulo) is a Brazilian swimmer.

He was named in honor of Brandon Lee, son of kung fu icon Bruce Lee.

Almeida, who made his Olympic debut at the age of 19 in the 2016 Rio Games, says all his best results followed difficult times. “If I have a poor practice or race, I don’t want to feel that feeling again,” Almeida says, “I always strive to improve.” A native of San Paulo, Brazil, Almeida has a robust support system in his family, friends, and coaches.

With his love for travel and making friends worldwide, Almeida maintained the work ethic and passion for the sport needed to make it to the next level and further compete on the international stage. He went on to swim for the University of South Carolina, in the United States, and continued to set records in the 400-meter freestyle. Since leaping from the junior ranks, Brandon represented Brazil in the 2016 Ontario (set South American record, 3:49:46) and 2018 Japan FINA World Championships; the 2017 Budapest (7th place; 4:13:00) and 2019 South Korea World Aquatics Championships; the 2018 Japan Pan Pacific Swimming Championships (3rd place; 4:03:71); and, the 2019 Peru Pan American Games where he won bronze in the 400-meter IM.

In 2020 Almeida swam for the New York Breakers in the professional league International Swimming League.

== International career ==
=== 2013–16 ===
Almeida was at the 2013 FINA World Junior Swimming Championships, in Dubai, United Arab Emirates, where he finished 9th in the 400-metre individual medley, 10th in the 800-metre freestyle, 15th in the 400-metre freestyle, and 15th in the 1500-metre freestyle.

In April 2015, participating in the Maria Lenk Trophy, he broke the Brazilian record in the 1500-metre freestyle, with a time of 15:12.20.

At the 2015 South American Swimming Youth Championships, held in Lima, Peru, Almeida won two gold medals.

At the age of 18, Almeida competed at the 2015 Pan American Games in Toronto, Ontario, Canada, where he won a gold medal in the Men's 400-metre individual medley, after Thiago Pereira, who had initially won the race, was disqualified. Almeida broke the junior world record, with a time of 4:14.47. He also won a bronze medal in the Men's 1500-metre freestyle, beating the Brazilian record, with a time of 15:11.70.

At the 2015 FINA World Junior Swimming Championships, held in Singapore, Almeida won the gold medal at 1500-metre freestyle and the silver medal at 400-metre medley.

At the Open Tournament held in Palhoça, Santa Catarina, Almeida broke again the junior world record in the 400-metre medley, with a time of 4:14.07.

=== 2016 Summer Olympics ===
At the 2016 Summer Olympics, he finished 15th in the Men's 400-metre individual medley, and 29th in the Men's 1500-metre freestyle.

=== 2016-20 ===
On 26 November 2016, in an Open tournament in Brazil, Almeida broke the long-course South American record in the 400-metre freestyle, with a time of 3:49.46.

At the 2016 FINA World Swimming Championships (25 m) in Windsor, Ontario, Canada, he finished 9th in the Men's 400-metre individual medley.

At the 2017 World Aquatics Championships in Budapest, in the Men's 400-metre individual medley, he went to his first World Championship final of his career, finishing in 7th place. He also finished 18th in the Men's 400-metre freestyle.

At the 2018 Pan Pacific Swimming Championships in Japan, he finished 6th in the Men's 400-metre individual medley and 12th in the Men's 200-metre individual medley.

At the 2018 FINA World Swimming Championships (25 m) in Hangzhou, China, he won a bronze medal in the Men's 400-metre individual medley, with a time of 4:03.71, his personal best.

At the 2019 World Aquatics Championships in Gwangju, South Korea, he finished 11th in the Men's 400-metre individual medley.

At the 2019 Pan American Games held in Lima, Peru, he won a bronze medal in the Men's 400-metre individual medley, and finished 6th in the Men's 200-metre backstroke.

In 2020, he competed in the International Swimming League for the US-based team, the New York Breakers.

== See also ==
- List of Brazilian records in swimming
- List of Junior world records in swimming
