= Mariella Venter =

South African swimmer (born 2000)

Personal information
- Full name: Mariella Greta Venter
- Nationality: South African
- Born: 10 January 2000 (age 26) Johannesburg, South Africa
- Height: 1.80 m (5 ft 11 in)
- Weight: 63 kg (139 lb)

Sport
- Sport: Swimming
- Strokes: Backstroke
- College team: University of Michigan
Medal record
Women's swimming
Representing South Africa
Event	1st	2nd	3rd
African Championships	4	0	0
Commonwealth Youth Games	2	0	1
Total	6	0	1
African Championships
Gold medal – first place	2016 Bloemfontein	100 m backstroke
Gold medal – first place	2016 Bloemfontein	200 m backstroke
Gold medal – first place	2016 Bloemfontein	4×100 m medley
Gold medal – first place	2016 Bloemfontein	4×100 m mixed medley
Commonwealth Youth Games
Gold medal – first place	2017 Nassau	100 m backstroke
Gold medal – first place	2017 Nassau	200 m backstroke
Bronze medal – third place	2017 Nassau	50 m backstroke

Mariella Greta Venter (born 10 January 2000) is a South African competitive swimmer who specializes in the backstroke. She competed in the women's 100 metre backstroke at the 2019 World Aquatics Championships.

She competed in the women's 4 x 100 metre medley relay at the 2020 Summer Olympics.

Venter competes at the collegiate level for the University of Michigan.
