= Zach Harting =

American swimmer (born 1997)

Personal information
- Born: August 27, 1997 (age 29) Madison, Alabama, U.S.
- Height: 5 ft 9.5 in (177 cm)

Sport
- Country: United States
- Sport: Swimming
- Strokes: Butterfly, freestyle
- Club: DC Trident; Cardinal Aquatics
- College team: University of Louisville
- Coach: Arthur Albiero (Louisville)
Medal record
Men's swimming
Representing United States
World Championships (LC)
Gold medal – first place	2024 Doha	4×100 m medley
World Championships (SC)
Gold medal – first place	2021 Abu Dhabi	4×200 m freestyle
Silver medal – second place	2024 Budapest	4×100 m medley
Pan Pacific Championships
Bronze medal – third place	2018 Tokyo	200 m butterfly
World University Games
Gold medal – first place	2017 Taipei	4×100 m medley relay

Zachory Scott Harting (born August 27, 1997) is a former American competitive swimmer who specializes in the butterfly and freestyle events. He currently represents the DC Trident which is part of the International Swimming League. He competed in the men's 200 metre butterfly at the 2019 World Aquatics Championships. In 2021, he qualified for the 2020 Summer Olympics in the 200m Butterfly.

== Early life ==
Zach Harting was born August 27, 1997, in Madison, Alabama, as the son of Scott and Lori Harting. Harting attended Bob Jones High School and swam for the Madison Swimming Association (2006-2010) and Huntsville Swim Association (2011-2016). In 2014, he was the High School State Champion in the 100-yard butterfly.

== College era swimming ==
Harting swam for the University of Louisville under Head Coach Arthur Albiero from 2015 to 2019. As a freshman for the Louisville Cardinals, he took silver in the 200-yard butterfly at the Atlantic Coast Conference (ACC) Championships, finished fifth in the 400 IM and won the B final of the 500-yard freestyle. At the 2016 Men's NCAA Division I Championships, he was part of the seventh place 800-yard freestyle relay team, while also swimming the 500-yard freestyle, 100 and 200-yard butterfly.

At the ACC Championships of the following year, Harting was second in the 200-yard butterfly (1:41.95), fifth in the 500-yard freestyle (4:16.67) and sixth in the 100-yard butterfly (46.42). He also took silver as part of the school record breaking 800 freestyle relay team. At the 2017 NCAA Division I Championships as a sophomore, Harting placed 11th in the 200-yard butterfly with a new school record time of 1:41.65.

Harting was a member of the 800, 400, and 200-yard freestyle relays, as well as in the 200 and 400-yard medley relays as a junior at the 2018 NCAA Division I Championships. Individually, he tied for fifth in the B final of the 200-yard butterfly and placed 15th in the 200-yard freestyle.

During his last season at Louisville, Harting earned earning All-American honors by finishing sixth in the 200-yard freestyle at the 2018 NCAA Division I Championships. He was also member of the All-American medley relays, 400 and 800-yard freestyle relays.

== International career ==
Harting was named to the USA Junior National Team after qualifying for the 2015 FINA World Junior Swimming Championships in Singapore in the 200m butterfly, finishing fifth at the meet. At the 2016 United States Olympic Trials Harting finished seventh in the same event.

In 2017, Harting had an outstanding summer season placing sixth in the 100m and 200m fly at the World Championship Trials, giving him a spot for the 2017 World University Games Roster. At the meet, he won a gold medal as part of the 4x100 freestyle and medley relays and was a semifinalist in the 200m and 100m butterfly.

Harting qualified for the 2018 Pan Pacific Championships, his first USA "A" team ever, by finishing second in the 200 butterfly at the 2018 National Swimming Championships. At the Pan Pac Championships in Tokyo, Japan Harting won a bronze medal in the 200m butterfly with a new best time of 1:55.01.

At the 2019 World Aquatics Championships, Harting placed sixth in the 200m butterfly. Harting was a member of the inaugural International Swimming League (ISL) representing DC Trident. He competed at the first two matches held in Indianapolis, Indiana, and Naples, Italy, respectively.

=== 2020 Tokyo Olympic Games ===
In 2021, he won the 200m butterfly at the 2020 US Olympic Swimming Trials, qualifying to represent the United States at the 2020 Olympic Games in Tokyo. At the 2020 Olympics, represented the United States placing ninth in the 200-meter butterfly with a time of 1:55.35, only 0.9 seconds behind Federico Burdisso who took the bronze medal with a time of 1:54.45.
