= Brendon Smith =

Australian swimmer (born 2000)

Personal information
- Nationality: Australian
- Born: 4 July 2000 (age 26) Wollongong, New South Wales, Australia
- Height: 1.89 m (6 ft 2 in)

Sport
- Sport: Swimming
- Club: Griffith University; Nunawading Swimming Club (former)
- Coach: Michael Bohl
Medal record
| Event | 1st | 2nd | 3rd |
|---|---|---|---|
| Olympic Games | 0 | 0 | 1 |
| World Championships (LC) | 0 | 1 | 0 |
| World Championships (SC) | 0 | 1 | 0 |
| Commonwealth Games | 1 | 1 | 0 |
| Universiade | 0 | 0 | 1 |
| Junior Pan Pacific Championships | 0 | 1 | 1 |
| Total | 1 | 4 | 3 |
Men's swimming
Representing Australia
Olympic Games
| Bronze medal – third place | 2020 Tokyo | 400 m medley |
World Championships (LC)
| Silver medal – second place | 2022 Budapest | 4×200 m freestyle |
World Championships (SC)
| Silver medal – second place | 2022 Melbourne | 4×200 m freestyle |
Commonwealth Games
| Gold medal – first place | 2026 Glasgow | 4×200 m freestyle |
| Silver medal – second place | 2022 Birmingham | 400 m medley |
Universiade
| Bronze medal – third place | 2019 Naples | 4×200 m freestyle |
Junior Pan Pacific Championships
| Silver medal – second place | 2018 Suva | 400 m freestyle |
| Bronze medal – third place | 2018 Suva | 4×200 m freestyle |

Brendon Smith (born 4 July 2000) is an Australian swimmer. He won the bronze medal in the 400 metre individual medley at the 2020 Summer Olympics and has competed in the Summer Universiade and the 2021 Australian Swimming Trials. Smith and Rob Woodhouse are the only Australian men to have won an Olympic medal in an individual medley event.

== Background ==
Smith trained with the Nunawading Swimming Club in Melbourne's Eastern Suburbs until 2022. In 2018 he was named by SwimSwam as one of the "20 Australians Under 20 You Need to be Watching" in the men's category. In 2022, Smith left his swim club in Nunawading and began training with Michael Bohl at Griffith University.

Smith is a student at La Trobe University, studying a Bachelor of Business in Accounting and Finance.

Smith is a lifesaver at the Half Moon Bay SLSC in Black Rock, Victoria. He competed at the Australian Youth Lifesaving Team at the 2018 Lifesaving World Championships. Smith was the only Victorian on the team. He broke two records and took home five medals, including a win in the men's 17-18 200m Obstacle Race.

== Career ==
He competed at the 2018 Junior Pan Pacific Swimming Championships in the 200 metre, 400 metre, and 800 metre freestyle events and the 200 metre individual medley, winning the silver medal in the 400 metre freestyle with a time of 3:52.67. A year later in 2019, Smith competed at the 2019 Summer Universiade in Naples, Italy in the 200 metre breaststroke, 800 metre freestyle and 400 metre individual medley and won the bronze medal in the 4×200 metre freestyle relay alongside Maxwell Carleton, Ashton Brinkworth, Jacob Hansford and Cameron Tysoe.

=== 2021 Summer Olympics Trials ===
Smith competed at the 2021 Australian Swimming Trials in the 200 metre, 800 metre, and 1500 metre freestyle events as well as both the 200 metre and 400 metre individual medley events. He qualified for the Australian Olympic swim team after achieving an Australian record in the 400 metre individual medley final with a time of 4:10.04, surpassing the previous record set by Thomas Fraser-Holmes at the 2013 Australian Swimming Championships with a time of 4:10.14.

=== 2020 Summer Olympics ===
2020 Summer Olympics
| Bronze medal – third place | 400 m individual medley | 4:10.38 |

At the 2020 Summer Olympics in Tokyo, Japan, and held in 2021 due to the COVID-19 pandemic, Smith broke both the Australian and Commonwealth record in the 400 metre individual medley with a time of 4.09.27 in the prelims heats. In the final, he won a bronze medal in the event with a time of 4:10.38, which was 0.10 seconds slower than silver medalist in the event Jay Litherland of the United States, less than one second slower than the gold medalist in the event Chase Kalisz of the United States, and marked Australia's first medal at the 2020 Olympic Games.

== See also ==
- Chronological summary of the 2020 Summer Olympics
