= Mason Wilby =

English swimmer

Personal information
- Nationality: British & American
- Born: 18 November 1999 (age 26) Kentucky, United States

Sport
- Sport: Swimming
- Event(s): Butterfly; Freestyle; IM

Mason Wilby (born 18 November 1999) is an English international swimmer. He has represented England at the Commonwealth Games.

== Biography ==
Wilby is the son of Martyn Wilby, the former coach of Gemma Spofforth and the Canadian Olympic team. Consequently, Mason Wilby grew up in the United States. He was educated at the University of Kentucky and holds dual citizenship. In 2017, at the Commonwealth Youth Games he won the 200 metres butterfly gold medal. Wilby won the silver medal behind James Guy in the 200 metres butterfly at the 2022 British Swimming Championships.

In 2022, he was selected for the 2022 Commonwealth Games in Birmingham where he competed in the men's 200 metres butterfly, reaching the final and finishing in 6th place.
