= Zac Reid =

New Zealand swimmer (born 2000)

Personal information
- Nationality: New Zealand
- Born: 28 January 2000 (age 26) New Plymouth, New Zealand

Sport
- Sport: Swimming
Medal record
Men's swimming
Representing New Zealand
Commonwealth Youth Games
Gold medal – first place	2017 Nassau	1500 m freestyle
Gold medal – first place	2017 Nassau	4×200 m mixed freestyle

Zac Reid (born 28 January 2000) is a New Zealand swimmer. He competed in the men's 400 metre freestyle at the 2019 World Aquatics Championships, and the 2020 Summer Olympics. At the games, Reid won his heat in the Men's 800m free, breaking his own New Zealand record in the process and finishing 18th out of 34. He also competed in the 400m free, where he placed 23 out of 36.

He earned the 2020 Taranaki Swimmer of the Year award and picked up a record fourth victory in the Flannagan Cup ocean swim in February 2021. Reid was named overall 2021 Taranaki Sportsperson of the Year at the Taranaki Sports Awards. Following a bout of COVID-19, Reid decided not to compete at the 2022 Commonwealth Games but instead focus on his recovery and work towards the 2024 Summer Olympics in Paris.
