= Luis Vega Torres =

Cuban-Spanish swimmer (born 1998)

Personal information
- Born: November 2, 1998 (age 27) London, Great Britain

Sport
- Sport: Swimming
Medal record
Representing Cuba
Central American and Caribbean Games
Bronze medal – third place	2018 Barranquilla	200m butterfly
Bronze medal – third place	2018 Barranquilla	400m individual medley

Luis Emigdio Vega Torres (born 2 November 1998) is a Cuban Swimmer. He competed at the 2016 Summer Olympics in the men's 400 metre individual medley event with a time of 4:27.25. He was the first man in Cuba to drop below 2 minutes in the 200-meter butterfly and he got the Cuban record in 200 meter butterfly 1:58:58 at the Russian National Swimming Championships in 2021. He obtained two bronze medals in the Central American games of Barranquilla 2018.

He competed at the 2020 Summer Olympics.
