= Chase Kalisz =

American swimmer (born 1994)

Chase Kalisz OLY
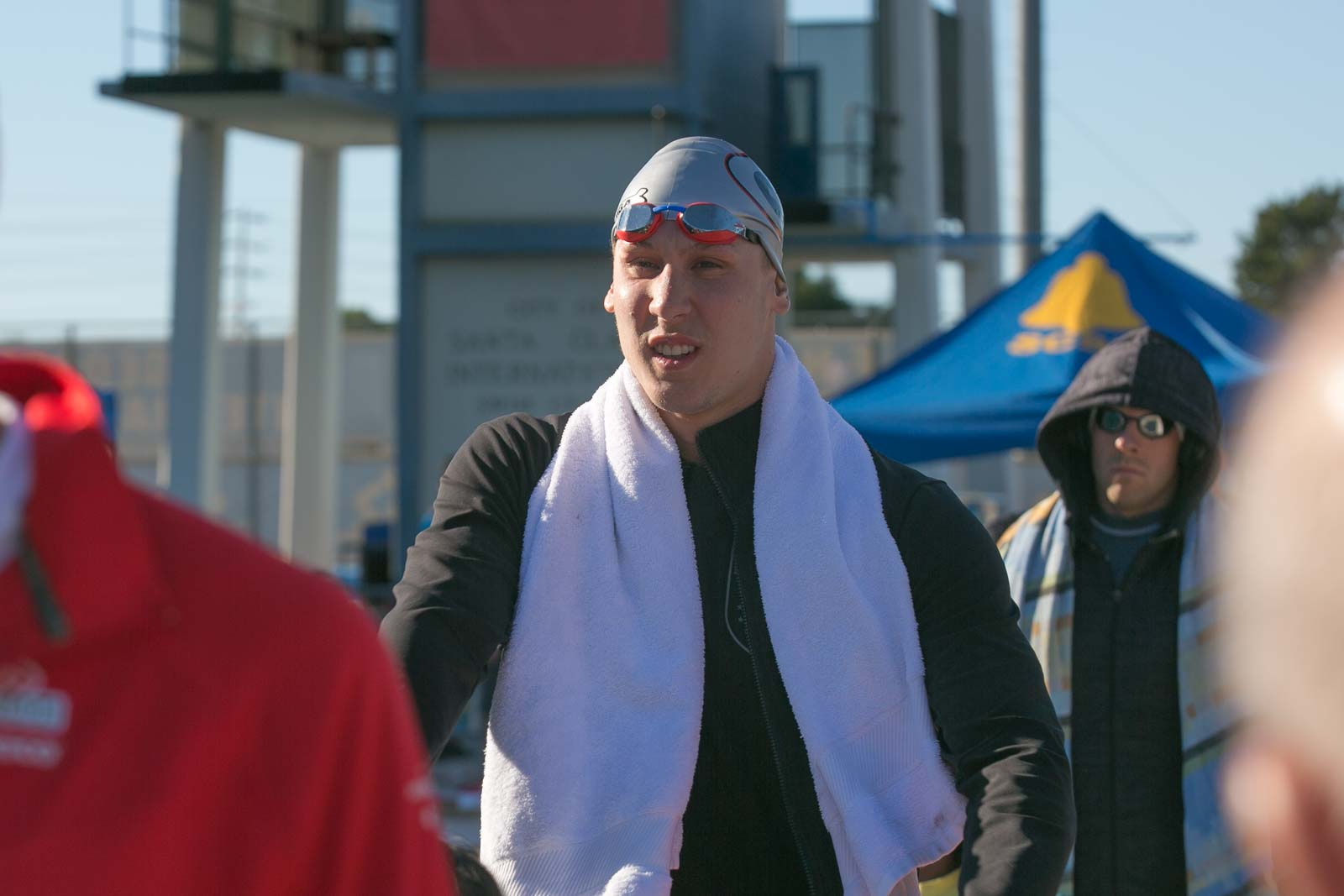
- Kalisz in 2018

Personal information
- Full name: Chase Tyler Kalisz
- Nickname: Killer Kalisz
- National team: United States
- Born: March 7, 1994 (age 32) Bel Air, Maryland, U.S.
- Height: 6 ft 4 in (193 cm)
- Weight: 190 lb (86 kg)

Sport
- Sport: Swimming
- Strokes: Breaststroke, butterfly, medley
- Club: North Baltimore Aquatic Club
- College team: University of Georgia
- Coach: Jack Bauerle (U. Georgia)
Medal record
Men's swimming
Representing the United States
Event	1st	2nd	3rd
Olympic Games	1	1	0
World Championships (LC)	2	1	3
Pan Pacific Championships	2	0	1
Total	5	2	4
Olympic Games
Gold medal – first place	2020 Tokyo	400 m medley
Silver medal – second place	2016 Rio de Janeiro	400 m medley
World Championships (LC)
Gold medal – first place	2017 Budapest	200 m medley
Gold medal – first place	2017 Budapest	400 m medley
Silver medal – second place	2013 Barcelona	400 m medley
Bronze medal – third place	2015 Kazan	400 m medley
Bronze medal – third place	2019 Gwangju	200 m medley
Bronze medal – third place	2022 Budapest	400 m medley
Pan Pacific Championships
Gold medal – first place	2018 Tokyo	200 m medley
Gold medal – first place	2018 Tokyo	400 m medley
Bronze medal – third place	2014 Gold Coast	400 m medley
Junior Pan Pacific Championships
Gold medal – first place	2012 Honolulu	200 m medley
Gold medal – first place	2012 Honolulu	400 m medley
Silver medal – second place	2012 Honolulu	4×200 m freestyle

NBC Sports: Kalisz wins USA's first gold medal at 2020 Summer Olympics

Chase Tyler Kalisz (/ˈkeɪlɪʃ/ KAY-lish; born March 7, 1994) is an American swimmer who specializes in individual medley events. He is an Olympic gold medalist in the 400-meter individual medley at the 2020 Summer Olympics in Tokyo, an Olympic silver medalist at the 2016 Summer Olympics in Rio de Janeiro and a two-time World Aquatics Championships gold medalist.

Kalisz attended the University of Georgia from 2012 to 2017 and competed for the Georgia Bulldogs swimming and diving team where he was a three-time NCAA Champion and the current American record-holder in the 400-yard individual medley.

== Early life and education ==
Kalisz graduated from Fallston High School in Fallston, Maryland.

== Career ==
=== 2012: Junior Pan Pacific champion ===
In August, at the 2012 Junior Pan Pacific Swimming Championships conducted at the Veterans Memorial Aquatic Center in Honolulu, Hawaii, Kalisz was the Junior Pan Pacific champion in both the 200 meter individual medley, where he won the gold medal with a Championships record of 1:59.51, and the 400 meter individual medley, where he won the gold medal in a Championships record time of 4:12.59, as well as a silver medalist in the 4×200 meter freestyle relay with a final relay time of 7:19.89. Additionally, he placed second in the B-final of the 200 meter freestyle with a 1:51.93 after swimming a 1:50.14 in the preliminaries. He served as a captain for Team USA at the Championships.

=== 2013: First NCAA title and world medal ===
==== 2013 NCAA Championships ====
During his first season of collegiate swimming for the Georgia Bulldogs, Kalisz won his first NCAA title in the 400 yard individual medley with a time of 3:38.05 at the 2013 NCAA Division I Men's Swimming and Diving Championships. His swim made him the sixth fastest swimmer in the race in history and the fastest at his age. Kalisz also set a new school record in the event for the University of Georgia, lowering his former school record by over 1.7 seconds.

==== 2013 World Championships ====
2013 World Championships
Silver medal – second place	400 m individual medley	4:09.22

Kalisz's qualification for the 2013 World Championships team at the 2013 US National Championships made him the fifth Georgia Bulldog in history to reach that stage of international swimming competition. He qualified to compete in one event, the 400 meter individual medley, when he won the national title in the event at the year's national championships with a personal best time of 4:11.83. At the 2013 World Aquatics Championships in Barcelona, Spain, Kalisz won the silver medal in the 400 meter individual medley, finishing with a time of 4:09.22, dropping over two full seconds off his previous best time, and touching the wall less than six tenths of a second behind the gold medal winner, Daiya Seto of Japan. Kalisz's swims at the US National Championships and World Championships were fast enough for him to make the 2013—2014 national team in both the 200 meter individual medley and the 400 meter individual medley. In November, Kalisz won USA Swimming's Golden Goggle Award for "Breakout Performer of the Year" for his accomplishments at the international and national levels in 2013.

=== 2014: Defending the 400 IM NCAA title ===
==== 2014 NCAA Championships ====
At the 2014 NCAA Championships in Austin, Texas in March, Kalisz successfully defended his title and broke the American record in the 400 yard individual medley, also called the 400 yard IM, previously set in 2009 by Tyler Clary, with a time of 3:34.50. In addition to setting a new American record, his time also set new US Open, NCAA, school, and pool records. The pool record he set for the Lee and Joe Jamail Texas Swimming Center stood through the duration of the 2019 NCAA Championships where the fastest swimmer was almost two full seconds off Kalisz's mark.

=== 2015: A galloping Georgia Bulldog ===
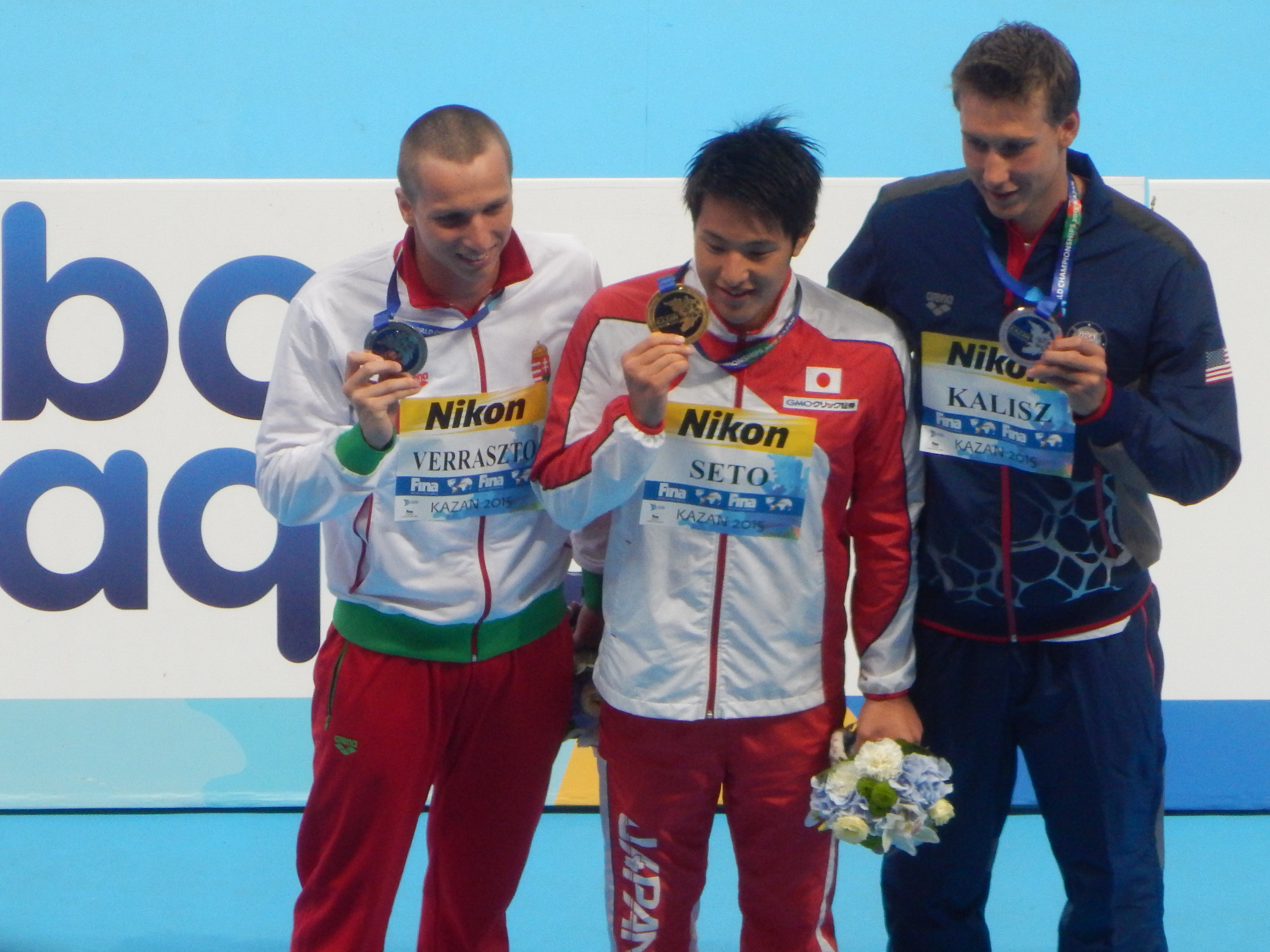
Medalists in swimming at the 2015 World Aquatics Championships – Men's 400 metre individual medley, left to right: Dávid Verrasztó (silver), Daiya Seto (gold), Chase Kalisz (bronze)

==== 2015 NCAA Championships ====
In his junior year of collegiate swimming for the Georgia Bulldogs, Kalisz placed second in the 400-yard individual medley, behind Texas Longhorns' Will Licon, finishing well off his best time in 3:39.51. Kalisz's coach at the time, Bob Bowman, dubbed Kalisz's third swimming season in college, the 2014–2015 school year, a "pretty terrible third year".

==== 2015 World Championships ====
At the 2015 FINA World Championships, Kalisz earned a bronze medal behind Daiya Seto of Japan and Dávid Verrasztó of Hungary in a time of 4:10.05.

=== 2016: Gap year from collegiate swimming ===
In order to prepare for the 2016 Summer Olympics, Kalisz took a gap year from collegiate swimming, the 2015—2016 swim season, so he could focus fully on giving the Olympic Games his all and trained with Michael Phelps under the coaching supervision of Bob Bowman.

==== 2016 US Olympic Trials ====
At his second Olympic Trials, the 2016 United States Olympic Trials in Omaha, Nebraska, Kalisz qualified for his first US Olympic Team, the 2016 Olympic Team, by finishing first in the 400 meter individual medley with a time of 4:09.54. He finished over one second ahead of second-place finisher Jay Litherland, who also made the US Olympic Team in the event, and over two seconds ahead of third-place finisher Ryan Lochte. Kalisz also competed in the 200 meter butterfly where he finished fifth with a time of 1:56.64 and the 200 meter individual medley where he was disqualified during his swim.

==== 2016 Summer Olympics ====
2016 Summer Olympics
Silver medal – second place	400 m individual medley	4:06.75

Kalisz competed in the 400 meter individual medley at the 2016 Olympic Games in Rio de Janeiro, Brazil in August. Ahead of his race and excited to compete at his first Olympic Games, Kalisz found one of the best practices for keeping his attention fully on the execution of his swimming prior to the race was leaving his mobile phone on airplane mode. Come race time, he won the silver medal in the final of the event with a time of 4:06.75 and was flanked in medal standings by two Japanese swimmers, Kosuke Hagino who took the gold medal and Daiya Seto who took the bronze medal. Kalisz's silver medal was the chronologically first Olympic medal of any kind for the United States in the sport of swimming at the 2016 Olympic Games. His medal also contributed to the substantial symbolic medal hauls of his home state, Maryland, and his college, University of Georgia. Swimmers from his home state representing the United States, including himself, won over ten medals at the 2016 Summer Olympics. Student athletes across all sports from the University of Georgia, a total of 37 athletes and coaches competed including Kalisz, won ten Olympic medals. Kalisz became the first male swimmer in the history of the university to win an Olympic medal.

==== 2016 Fall Invitational ====
Returning to the University of Georgia for his fourth and final year of collegiate swimming, the 2016—2017 swim season, Kalisz won four events including the 100 yard breaststroke, 200 yard butterfly, 200 yard individual medley, and 400 yard individual medley at the 2016 University of Georgia Fall Invitational in December. His time of 1:40.38 set a new pool record, meaning the fastest time swam in the event at the given pool in history, for the Ramsey Center at the University of Georgia and helped earn him the honor of Southeastern Conference, SEC, "Male Swimmer of the Week". The pool record lasted past the 2019 SEC Championships at the same pool where the fastest swimmer in the preliminaries was over a second slower than Kalisz's time.

=== 2017: Thrice an NCAA champion in the 400 IM ===
==== 2017 NCAA Championships ====
During his senior year competing for the Georgia Bulldogs, and leading up to the 2017 NCAA Championships, Kalisz swam a 1:41.28 at the 2017 Southeastern Conference, SEC, Championships to set a new SEC Championships record in the event, breaking the record time of 1:41.76 set in 2005 by Ryan Lochte. The time was also a new pool record for the Jones Aquatic Center in Knoxville, Tennessee, where the Championships were held, and lasted five years and one day until it was broken by Luca Urlando at the 2022 SEC Championships.

Kalisz won the 400 yard individual medley NCAA title for a third time at the 2017 NCAA Championships, breaking his own American record and setting a new pool record for the Indiana University Natatorium with a time of 3:33.42 in the final. His swim in the prelims of the same event with a 3:37.18 had also set a new pool record, though the record lasted less than a day as his swim in the final lowered the record by over three seconds. In addition to the two pool records and the American record, Kalisz achieved new US Open, NCAA, and school records with his time in the final. He became the sixth swimmer in NCAA history to win the title in the men's 400 yard individual medley three or more times, with the previous person, Tim Siciliano, achieving the feat in 2001. He also became the third male Georgia Bulldog swimmer or diver to win three individual NCAA titles after swimmer Sebastien Rouault and diver Chris Colwill.

==== 2017 National Championships ====
At the 2017 Phillips 66 National Championships in Indianapolis, Kalisz won both the 200 meter and 400 meter individual medleys, earning himself a spot on the 2017 World Championship Team in those events. He also finished third in the 200 meter butterfly with a time of 1:54.79, missing the World Championship team in that event by less than three tenths of a second.

==== 2017 World Championships ====
2017 World Championships
Gold medal – first place	200 m individual medley	1:55.56
Gold medal – first place	400 m individual medley	4:05.90 (CR)

At the 2017 FINA World Championships in Budapest, Hungary, Kalisz won gold medals in both of his events, setting a new Championship Record in the 400 IM in a time of 4:05.90, beating the previous record held by Michael Phelps set a decade before in Melbourne.

=== 2018 ===
Kalisz's swims at the year's Pan Pacific Championships and National Championships earned him nominations for two Golden Goggle Awards, "Male Race of the Year" and "Male Athlete of the Year". Less than two weeks after the award winners were revealed and Kalisz won neither Golden Goggle Award, he won the "Male American Swimmer of the Year" award from Swimming World.

=== 2019: Breaststroke classic dreams ===
At the 2019 Atlanta Classic in Atlanta, Kalisz took second place in the 100 meter breaststroke with his time of 1:01.96, qualified for the event at the 2020 US Olympic Trials, and finished as one of only two swimmers in the final to swim the race in less than 1:02.00, the other being Caeleb Dressel of the Florida Gators.

=== 2021: Turning Olympic silver into gold ===
==== 2020 US Olympic Trials ====
In June 2021 at the 2020 US Olympic Trials in Omaha, Nebraska, Kalisz earned a spot on his second US Olympic Team on the first night of competition in the 400-meter individual medley. Looking forward to the chance to win an Olympic gold medal in the 400-meter individual medley after winning a silver medal in the event at the 2016 Olympic Games, Kalisz expressed he was grateful for the extra training time the COVID-19 pandemic provided, saying, "I don't want to say I wasn't prepared last year, because I was. But I'm 27 now. My body needs rest a lot more than it ever has." By making the US Olympic Team for the 2020 Olympic Games, Kalisz helped continue the representation of his alma mater, University of Georgia, at the Olympic Games, marking the ninth-consecutive Olympic Games the Georgia Bulldogs had swimmers make the US Olympic Team. Additionally, Kalisz made the US Olympic Team in the 200-meter individual medley by placing second in the event behind Michael Andrew with his time of 1:56.97, making the 2020 Summer Olympics the first Olympic Games for which Kalisz qualified to compete in more than one event. His time improved upon his 1:59.72 from the 2020 U.S. Open Swimming Championships, where he won the gold medal in the event.

==== 2020 Summer Olympics ====
2020 Summer Olympics
Gold medal – first place	400 m individual medley	4:09.42

At the 2020 Summer Olympics in Tokyo, Kalisz won gold in the 400-meter individual medley with a time of 4:09.42 on day two of competition. His medal was the first medal for the United States at the Olympic Games in any sport. Before Kalisz won his gold medal, the United States had won no medals for the 2020 Olympics, including no medals on day one of competition, which was the longest the U.S. had gone without winning a single medal at an Olympic Games since 49 years earlier at the 1972 Summer Olympics. Taking his silver medal performance from the 2016 Olympic Games and turning it into a gold medal performance where he made the first Olympic medal the United States won in 2021 a gold medal, Kalisz had only good things to say, "The U.S. has a proud legacy in the 400m individual medley. This was my redemption story." His victory marked the first gold medal in the event since Ryan Lochte won the gold medal in the 400 meter individual medley at the 2012 Summer Olympics and made Kalisz the second-oldest male swimmer in history to win an Olympic gold medal in the 400 meter individual medley, only younger than Ryan Lochte. The occurrence of his winning the gold medal combined with American teammate Jay Litherland winning the silver medal in the 400 meter individual medley marked an improvement in the performance of the duo of Americans entered in the event over the previous two Olympic Games where the next best performance from two Americans was Ryan Lochte winning the gold medal and Michael Phelps finishing in fourth place at the 2012 Olympics.

His medal also contributed to the five medal haul for former and current University of Georgia swimmers, coached by Jack Bauerle, on the second day of swimming competitions. The victory was also a personal triumph for Kalisz who overcame a shoulder injury from 2019 to win his gold medal. For his swim that transcended the sport of swimming and made him the literal Olympic medal, and gold medal, leader (chronologically first medal winner) for the United States across all sports at the 2020 Summer Olympics, as well as overcoming personal hardship and injury to achieve the gold medal in the 400-meter individual medley, Kalisz received nominations for the USA Swimming Foundation's Golden Goggle Awards for "Male Race of the Year" and "Male Athlete of the Year".

On the fifth day of competition, Kalisz ranked fourth overall with a time of 1:57.38 in the prelims heats of the 200-meter individual medley and qualified for the semifinals. His semifinal swim ranked him sixth in his semifinal heat and did not advance him to the final in the event. While Kalisz did not medal in the 200 meter individual medley, his times in the event from January through August 2021 as well as his times in the 400 meter individual medley earned him a spot on the 2021—2022 US National Team in each event. Additionally, Kalisz's one total medal accounted for one of the eleven medals won by the 27 University of Georgia student athletes, past and present, across all sports who competed at the 2020 Summer Olympics and represented twelve different countries.

==== International Swimming League ====
In the inaugural 2021 ISL draft, Kalisz was selected 17th overall by the Aqua Centurions.

=== 2022 ===
==== Pro Swim Series – San Antonio ====
In the prelims heats of the 100 meter breaststroke at the 2022 Pro Swim Series, held at Northside Swim Center in San Antonio, Texas, on day two, Kalisz qualified for the final ranking sixth with a time of 1:01.90. For the final, he tied his personal best time of 1:01.64 and placed sixth. Day three prelims, he swam a 1:59.99 in the 200 meter butterfly, qualifying for the final ranking first, and a 2:14.40 in the 200 meter breaststroke, qualifying for the final ranking second. He won the 200 meter butterfly final with a 1:56.79 and placed third in the final of the 200 meter breaststroke with a 2:12.47. In the preliminary heats of the 200 meter individual medley on the fourth and final day, he qualified for the final ranking fourth with a 2:00.65, which was 1.05 seconds behind first-ranked Michael Andrew and 0.79 seconds behind third-ranked Shaine Casas. Kalisz placed third in the final with a 1:57.10, finishing less than half a second behind Shaine Casas and Léon Marchand.

==== 2022 International Team Trials ====
Starting off the 2022 US International Team Trials in Greensboro, North Carolina, on day one, Kalisz advanced to the final of the 200 meter butterfly with a time of 1:56.04 and overall rank of third in the prelims heats. In the final, he finished in 1:56.03, placing fourth. He ranked first overall in the preliminary heats of the 400 meter individual medley two days later, qualifying for the final with a time of 4:13.24. With a time of 4:10.50 in the final, he placed second a little over a second behind first-place finisher Carson Foster. The fifth and final day, he swam a 1:58.15 in the prelims heats of the 200 meter individual medley to qualify for the final ranking first. He won the final with a 1:56.21, qualifying for the 2022 World Aquatics Championships team in the event. His second-place finish in the 400 meter individual medley also earned him a spot in the event on the team.

==== 2022 World Championships ====
2022 World Championships
Bronze medal – third place	400 m individual medley	4:07.47

At the 2022 World Aquatics Championships, Kalisz ranked third in the preliminary heats of the 400 meter individual medley on day one of swimming competition with a 4:10.32, advancing to the final behind first-ranked Léon Marchand and second-ranked Carson Foster. In the evening final, the trio repeated their ranking from the preliminaries with Kalisz winning the bronze medal in 4:07.47, Léon Marchand winning the gold medal, and Carson Foster winning the silver medal. Three days later, he ranked second in the morning preliminaries of the 200 meter individual medley with a time of 1:58.25 and qualifying for the semifinals. Dropping 1.49 seconds from his preliminaries time in the evening semifinals, he qualified for the final ranking fourth. He placed fourth in the final with a time of 1:56.43, finishing 0.21 seconds behind bronze medalist Daiya Seto of Japan. Following his performances, he was named to the 2022 Duel in the Pool roster.

==== 2022 U.S. Open Championships ====
Day two of the 2022 U.S. Open Swimming Championships, held in Greensboro in November and December, Kalisz won the gold medal in the 200 meter individual medley with a Championships record time of 1:56.52, which was 2.62 seconds ahead of silver medalist Baylor Nelson and 3.37 seconds ahead of bronze medalist Daniel Diehl. The next day, he followed up with a gold medal in a Championships record time of 4:10.09 in the 400 meter individual medley. For the final of the 200 meter breaststroke on the fourth and final day, he won the silver medal with a time of 2:10.10, which was just 0.20 seconds slower than his personal best time of 2:09.90 from 2018.

=== 2024 ===
==== 2024 Summer Olympics ====
At the 2024 Summer Olympics in Paris, he missed the finals of the event after an 11th-place finish in this morning's prelims. Kalisz swam to a 4:13.36, about two seconds off of the 4:11.52 that it took to qualify for finals.

== International championships ==
Meet	200 breaststroke	200 butterfly	200 individual medley	400 individual medley	4×200 freestyle relay
Junior level
WJC 2011	4th		4th	6th	
PACJ 2012			1st place, gold medalist(s)	1st place, gold medalist(s)	2nd place, silver medalist(s)
Senior level
WC 2013				2nd place, silver medalist(s)	
PAC 2014		7th (heats)	10th (heats)	3rd place, bronze medalist(s)	
WC 2015				3rd place, bronze medalist(s)	
OG 2016				2nd place, silver medalist(s)	
WC 2017			1st place, gold medalist(s)	1st place, gold medalist(s)	
PAC 2018	DNS	14th (heats)	1st place, gold medalist(s)	1st place, gold medalist(s)	
WC 2019			3rd place, bronze medalist(s)	10th	
OG 2020			12th	1st place, gold medalist(s)	
WC 2022			4th	3rd place, bronze medalist(s)	

== Career best times ==
=== Long course meters (50 m pool) ===
Event	Time	Meet	Location	Site (Venue)	Date
100 m breaststroke	1:01.64	2018 TYR Pro Swim Series - Columbus 2022 TYR Pro Swim Series - San Antonio	Columbus, Ohio San Antonio, Texas	McCorkle Aquatic Pavilion at Ohio State University Northside Swim Center	July 8, 2018 March 31, 2022
200 m breaststroke	2:09.90	2018 TYR Pro Swim Series - Indianapolis	Indianapolis, Indiana	Indiana University Natatorium	May 17, 2018
100 m butterfly	53.52	2018 TYR Pro Swim Series - Columbus	Columbus, Ohio	McCorkle Aquatic Pavilion at Ohio State University	July 6, 2018
200 m butterfly	1:54.79	2017 National Championships	Indianapolis, Indiana	Indiana University Natatorium	June 27, 2017
200 m individual medley	1:55.40	2018 Pan Pacific Championships	Tokyo, Japan	Tokyo Tatsumi International Swimming Center	August 11, 2018
400 m individual medley	4:05.90	2017 World Championships	Budapest, Hungary	Alfréd Hajós National Swimming Stadium	July 30, 2017

=== Short course yards (25 yd pool) ===
Event	Time	Meet	Location	Site (Venue)	Date
200 yd butterfly	1:40.38	University of Georgia Invitational	Athens, Georgia	Ramsey Center at University of Georgia	December 4, 2016
200 yd individual medley	1:41.19	2014 NCAA Championships	Austin, Texas	Lee and Joe Jamail Texas Swimming Center	March 27, 2014
400 yd individual medley	3:33.42	2017 NCAA Championships	Indianapolis, Indiana	Indiana University Natatorium	March 24, 2017

== Records ==
=== National records (short course yards) ===
Event	Time	Meet	Location	Date	Age	Type	Status	Ref
400 yd individual medley	3:34.50	2014 NCAA Championships	Austin, Texas	March 27, 2014	20	NR, US	Former	
400 yd individual medley	3:33.42	2017 NCAA Championships	Indianapolis, Indiana	March 24, 2017	23	NR, US	Current NR	

Legend: NR – American record; US – US Open record

=== Pool records (short course yards) ===
Event	Time		Meet	Location	Site (Pool)	Date	Age	Ref
400 yd individual medley	3:34.50		2014 NCAA Championships	Austin, Texas	Lee and Joe Jamail Texas Swimming Center	March 27, 2014	20	
200 yd butterfly	1:40.38		University of Georgia Invitational	Athens, Georgia	Ramsey Center at University of Georgia	December 4, 2016	22	
200 yd individual medley	1:41.28		2017 SEC Championships	Knoxville, Tennessee	Allan Jones Intercollegiate Aquatic Center	February 15, 2017	22	
400 yd individual medley	3:37.18	h	2017 NCAA Championships	Indianapolis, Indiana	Indiana University Natatorium	March 24, 2017	23	
400 yd individual medley	3:33.42		2017 NCAA Championships	Indianapolis, Indiana	Indiana University Natatorium	March 24, 2017	23	

Legend: h – heats

== Awards and honors ==
- SwimSwam Top 100 (Men's): 2021 (#30), 2022 (#27)
- Golden Goggle Award, Breakout Performer of the Year: 2013
- Swimming World American Swimmer of the Year (male): 2018
- Golden Goggle Award nominee, Male Athlete of the Year: 2018, 2021
- Golden Goggle Award nominee, Male Race of the Year: 2018 (200-meter individual medley), 2021 (400-meter individual medley)

== See also ==
- Chronological summary of the 2016 Summer Olympics
- Chronological summary of the 2020 Summer Olympics
- Kalisz, a city in Poland
