= Ciara Smith =

New Zealand swimmer

Personal information
- Nationality: New Zealand
- Born: 9 December 2000 (age 25)

Sport
- Sport: Swimming

Ciara Smith (born 9 December 2000) is a New Zealand swimmer. She competed in the women's 100 metre breaststroke event at the 2018 FINA World Swimming Championships (25 m), in Hangzhou, China.
