= Jay Litherland =

American swimmer (born 1995)

Jay Litherland OLY
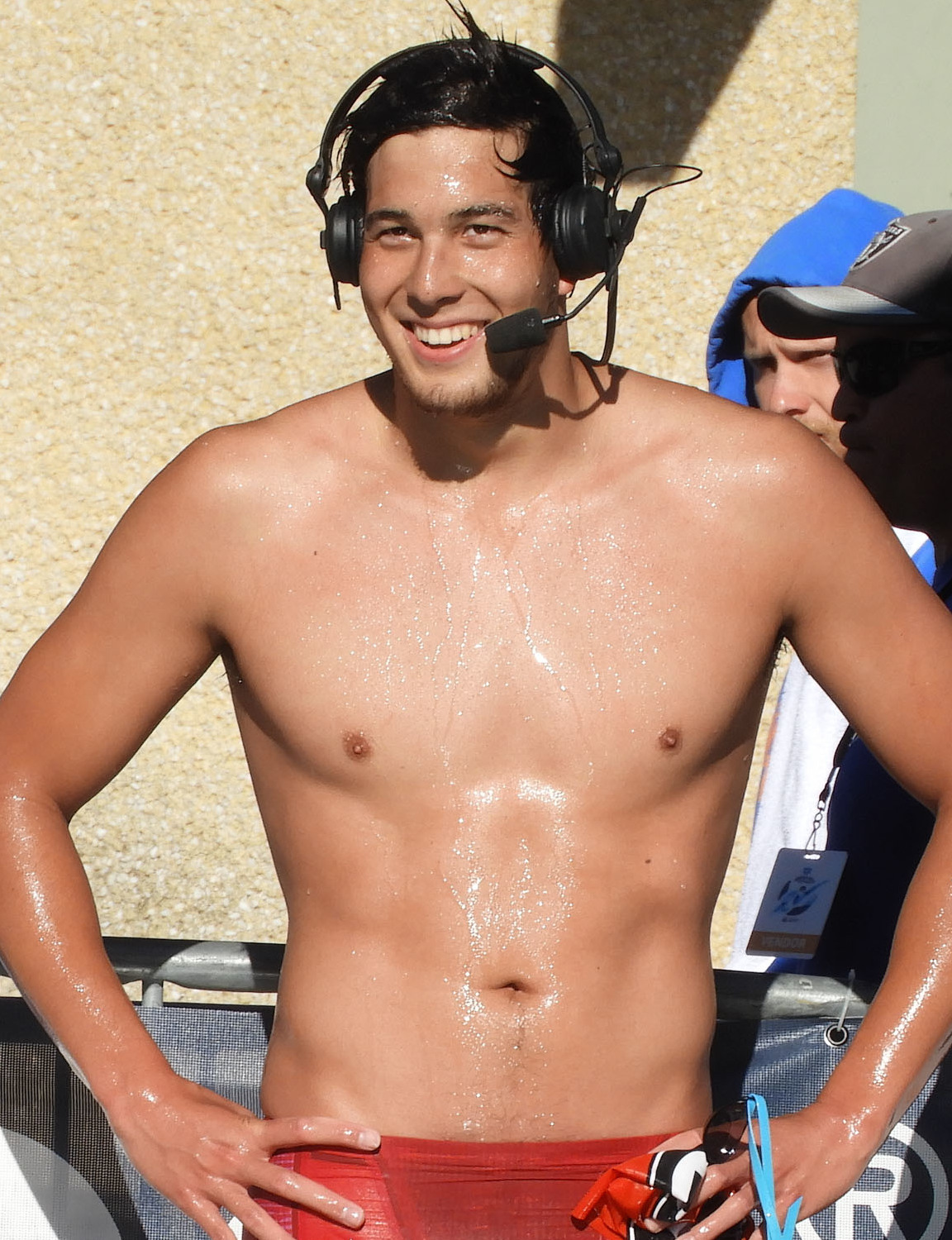
- Litherland at 2015 Gwangju

Personal information
- National team: United States
- Born: August 24, 1995 (age 31) Amagasaki, Japan
- Height: 6 ft 0 in (183 cm)
- Weight: 176 lb (80 kg)

Sport
- Sport: Swimming
- Events: Medley, Freestyle relay
- Strokes: Medley
- Club: Dynamo Swim Club, Atlanta, GA; DC Trident (Pro, ISL)
- College team: University of Georgia
- Coach: Ron Loula (Chattahoochee High); R. Murphy, F. Ressigue (Dynamo SC); Jason Turcotte (Dynamo SC); Jack Bauerle (U. Georgia)
Medal record
Men's swimming
Representing the United States
Olympic Games
Silver medal – second place	2020 Tokyo	400 m medley
World Championships (LC)
Silver medal – second place	2019 Gwangju	400 m medley
Bronze medal – third place	2017 Budapest	4x200 m freestyle
Pan American Games
Gold medal – first place	2023 Santiago	400 m medley
Summer Universiade
Gold medal – first place	2015 Gwangju	400 m Medley
World Junior Championships
Bronze medal – third place	2013 Dubai	4 × 200 m freestyle
Representing the Georgia Bulldogs
Event	1st	2nd	3rd
NCAA Championships	0	0	1
Total	0	0	1
NCAA Championships
Bronze medal – third place	2016 Atlanta	400 y medley

Jay Litherland (born August 24, 1995) is an American competition swimmer. He has represented DC Trident, professional team that is part of the International Swimming League. He won the silver medal in the Men's 400 Individual Medley at the 2020 Tokyo Olympics in 4:10.28. He was a World University Games gold medalist at the 2015 Summer Universiade and a bronze medalist at the FINA World Junior Swimming Championships. Litherland competed for the University of Georgia in American collegiate swimming under Head Coach Jack Bauerle.

== Early life ==
Litherland and his brothers, Mick and Kevin, were born in Amagasaki, Japan on August 24, 1995, as triplets. His father, Andrew Litherland, is a chef from New Zealand, and his mother, Chizuko, is from Japan. He grew up speaking Japanese at home. The family settled in Johns Creek, Georgia, and Litherland was named an All-American in swimming while he was a student at Chattahoochee High School. At Chattahoochee High, Jay was coached by Ron Loula, and won Georgia State titles in both the 100 breaststroke and backstroke. Litherland and his brothers grew up swimming at Dynamo Swim Club in Atlanta, and each attended and competed as swimmers at the University of Georgia.

Litherland received U.S. citizenship in high school. As a triple citizen of Japan, New Zealand, and the United States, he could compete for any of those countries at the Olympics. He initially contacted the New Zealand swimming federation with interest in competing for them at the 2016 Olympics. Still, he had already competed for the U.S. at an international event, meaning he would have required special permission to switch to New Zealand. His brothers decided to participate in the New Zealand Olympic trials instead of the U.S. trials, which left Litherland "kind of bummed that I'm not representing New Zealand with them, but I'm really excited for them." His brothers did not make the New Zealand team, so all three competed in the U.S. trials together.

He is fluent in Japanese.

== College Career: University of Georgia ==
Litherland attended the University of Georgia from 2014-2018 where he swam for Head Coach Jack Bauerle. As a Senior at Georgia, he was the recipient of All-America honors twice at the NCAAs, and completed his Georgia career with a total of nine NCAA All American honors.

Distinguished in his honors, as a Senior, he was announced as the Damon Evans Swimming Scholarship Endowment honoree. Litherland set a number of university swimming records including having the second fastest time in the 200 backstroke and the 200 freestyle. He had the third fastest time in the 400 individual medley, and the fifth fastest time in the 500 freestyle.

== International career ==
=== 2015 World University Games ===
At the 2015 Summer Universiade in Gwangju, Litherland won gold in the 400-meter IM, out-splitting compatriot Josh Prenot by 3 seconds on the freestyle leg to overtake him at 4:12.43.

=== 2016 U.S. Olympic Trials ===
At the 2016 United States Olympic Trials, Litherland qualified for his first Olympic team by placing second in the 400-meter Individual Medley behind Georgia teammate Chase Kalisz at 4:11.02.

=== 2016 Rio Olympics ===
At the 2016 Summer Olympics, Litherland placed 5th in the 400-meter IM at 4:11.68.

=== 2017 National Championships/World Championship Trials ===
At the 2017 USA Swimming Championships, Litherland placed 2nd in the 400-meter IM at 4:09.31, qualifying him to swim the event at that year's World Championships. He also finished 5th in the 200-meter IM, 9th in the 400-meter freestyle, and 7th in the 200-meter freestyle.

=== 2017 World Championships ===
At the 2017 World Aquatics Championships, Litherland placed 5th in the 400-meter IM at 4:12.05. He also swam in the heats of the 4x200-meter freestyle relay and earned his first World Championship medal, a bronze, when the US team placed 3rd in the final.

=== 2018 U.S. National Championships ===
At the 2018 USA Swimming Championships, Litherland swam a time of 4:10.21 in the 400-meter IM to place 2nd. He also finished 6th in the 200-meter IM and 7th in the 200-meter freestyle.

=== 2019 World Championships ===
Jay's only event at the 2019 World Aquatics Championships was on the final day. With Teammate Chase Kalisz failing to make the final, Jay Litherland was the only American in the 400 IM Final. Sitting 3.34 Seconds behind the leader, Daiya Seto at the 300 mark, Litherland closed the gap to 0.27, placing 2nd and gaining his first individual World Championship medal.

== 2020 Tokyo Olympic silver medal ==
In the 400-meter individual medley, Litherland closed strongly to win the silver medal in 4:10.28. He out touched bronze medalist Brendon Smith by one-tenth of a second.

== Career best times ==
=== Long course (50-meter pool) ===
Event	Time	Venue	Date
400 m IM	4:09.22	South Korea	July 28, 2019
