= Swimming at the 2017 Summer Universiade – Men's 100 metre butterfly =

Men's 100 metre butterfly competition

Men's 100 metre butterfly at the 2017 Summer Universiade
- Venue: National Taiwan Sport University Arena
- Location: Taipei, Taiwan
- Dates: 24 August (heats and semifinals); 25 August (final)
- Competitors: 70 from 45 nations
- Winning time: 51.81

Medalists
gold medal	Aleksandr Sadovnikov	Russia
silver medal	Andrii Khloptsov	Ukraine
bronze medal	Henrique Martins	Brazil

The Men's 100 metre butterfly competition at the 2017 Summer Universiade was held on 24 and 25 August 2017.

== Records ==
Prior to the competition, the existing world and Universiade records were as follows.

World record	Michael Phelps (USA)	49.82	Rome, Italy	1 August 2009
Competition record	Jason Dunford (KEN)	50.85	Belgrade, Serbia	9 July 2009

== Results ==
=== Heats ===
The heats were held on 24 August at 9:32.

Rank	Heat	Lane	Name	Nationality	Time	Notes
1	9	2	Aleksandr Sadovnikov	Russia	52.43	Q
2	10	4	Henrique Martins	Brazil	52.51	Q
3	10	7	Andrii Khloptsov	Ukraine	52.52	Q
4	10	5	Bence Pulai	Hungary	52.62	Q
5	8	1	Oleksii Ivanov	Ukraine	52.80	Q
6	9	4	Yuki Kobori	Japan	52.85	Q
7	9	3	Justin Lynch	United States	52.89	Q
8	8	6	Michał Poprawa	Poland	53.00	Q
9	8	4	Vinicius Lanza	Brazil	53.03	Q
10	9	1	Jan Šefl	Czech Republic	53.14	Q
11	9	5	Konrad Czerniak	Poland	53.16	Q
12	8	5	Nao Horomura	Japan	53.21	Q
13	7	4	Aleksandr Kudashev	Russia	53.29	Q
13	10	2	Zach Harting	United States	53.29	Q
15	10	1	Josiah Binnema	Canada	53.34	Q
16	10	3	Kaan Türker Ayar	Turkey	53.40	Q
17	10	6	Giacomo Carini	Italy	53.46	
17	9	6	Brayden McCarthy	Australia	53.46	
19	7	3	Brendan Hyland	Ireland	53.49	
20	6	2	Mateo Gonzalez	Mexico	53.52	
20	8	3	Long Gutiérrez	Mexico	53.52	
22	7	2	Ryan Coetzee	South Africa	53.57	
23	8	2	Marcus Schlesinger	Israel	53.64	
24	9	7	Stefanos Dimitriadis	Greece	53.70	
25	7	7	Conor Brines	Ireland	53.75	
26	8	7	Alexander Kunert	Germany	53.77	
27	9	8	Yahor Dodaleu	Belarus	53.80	
28	7	5	Paul Pijulet	France	53.91	
29	6	3	Cameron Brodie	Great Britain	53.93	
30	5	8	Joe Litchfield	Great Britain	53.98	
31	7	8	Jesper Björk	Sweden	53.99	
32	10	8	Tadas Duškinas	Lithuania	53.99	
33	6	4	Chu Chen-ping	Chinese Taipei	54.09	
34	5	3	Alard Basson	South Africa	54.27	
35	7	6	Paul Lemaire	France	54.31	
36	6	5	Lee Tae-gu	South Korea	54.40	
37	6	6	Laurent Bams	Netherlands	54.54	
38	5	4	Bence Biczó	Hungary	54.63	
39	4	8	Cevin Siim	Estonia	54.73	
40	6	1	Tomáš Havránek	Czech Republic	55.17	
41	4	7	Joshua Gold	Estonia	55.20	
42	6	7	Chou Wei-liang	Chinese Taipei	55.21	
43	6	8	David Arias	Colombia	55.22	
44	5	1	Nicolás Deferrari	Argentina	55.26	
45	5	7	Jin Yuli	China	55.27	
46	4	4	Fynn Minuth	Germany	55.36	
47	7	1	Sascha Subarsky	Austria	55.47	
48	5	6	Derick Ng	Hong Kong	55.54	
49	4	5	Adityastha Rai Wratsangka	Indonesia	55.69	
50	5	2	Vladimír Štefánik	Slovakia	55.84	
51	4	6	Zhang Shimeng	China	55.85	
52	3	4	Daniel Namir	Israel	55.87	
53	5	5	Michael Gunning	Jamaica	55.92	
53	3	3	Mahieddine Galdem	Algeria	56.69	
55	4	3	Muhammad Hamgari	Indonesia	56.82	
56	3	6	Jaakko Rautalin	Finland	56.86	
57	4	2	Ho Tin Long	Hong Kong	56.89	
58	3	5	Carlos Orihuela	Paraguay	57.32	
59	2	3	Lin Sizhuang	Macau	58.26	
60	4	1	Daniel Mitsumasu	Peru	58.42	
61	3	2	Janne Markkanen	Finland	58.74	
62	2	4	Lee Zheng Kai	Singapore	59.77	
63	2	5	Ho Wei Ming	Singapore	1:00.20	
64	3	1	Sherif Assi	Lebanon	1:01.14	
65	2	2	Jeffrey Galea	Malta	1:02.95	
66	2	7	Alexander Turnbull	Malta	1:04.18	
67	1	4	Aiman Al-Qasmi	Oman	1:05.48	
68	3	8	Leonard Licudo	Philippines	1:05.81	
69	2	6	Conrado Sacco	Paraguay	1:08.58	
70	1	3	Khalid Al-Jahdhami	Oman	1:11.33	
	1	5	Sunday Nwabogor	Nigeria	DNS	
	2	1	Godswill Archibong	Nigeria	DNS	
	3	7	Mohamed Chelbeb	Algeria	DNS	
	8	8	Nicholas Brown	Australia	DNS	

=== Semifinals ===
The semifinals were held on 24 August at 19:23.

==== Semifinal 1 ====
Rank	Lane	Name	Nationality	Time	Notes
1	4	Henrique Martins	Brazil	52.16	Q
2	3	Yuki Kobori	Japan	52.33	Q
3	5	Bence Pulai	Hungary	52.57	Q
4	7	Nao Horomura	Japan	52.69	
5	6	Michał Poprawa	Poland	52.82	
6	1	Aleksandr Kudashev	Russia	53.14	
7	2	Jan Šefl	Czech Republic	53.29	
8	8	Kaan Türker Ayar	Turkey	53.57	

==== Semifinal 2 ====
Rank	Lane	Name	Nationality	Time	Notes
1	5	Andrii Khloptsov	Ukraine	51.80	Q
1	3	Oleksii Ivanov	Ukraine	52.35	Q
3	7	Konrad Czerniak	Poland	52.40	Q
4	2	Vinicius Lanza	Brazil	52.62	Q
5	4	Aleksandr Sadovnikov	Russia	52.63	Q
6	1	Zach Harting	United States	53.23	
7	6	Justin Lynch	United States	53.27	
8	8	Josiah Binnema	Canada	53.77	

=== Final ===
The final was held on 25 August at 19:19.

Rank	Lane	Name	Nationality	Time	Notes
1st place, gold medalist(s)	8	Aleksandr Sadovnikov	Russia	51.81	
2nd place, silver medalist(s)	4	Andrii Khloptsov	Ukraine	51.91	
3rd place, bronze medalist(s)	5	Henrique Martins	Brazil	51.96	
4	2	Konrad Czerniak	Poland	52.00	
5	3	Yuki Kobori	Japan	52.09	
6	7	Bence Pulai	Hungary	52.56	
7	1	Vinicius Lanza	Brazil	52.59	
8	6	Oleksii Ivanov	Ukraine	52.60	
