= Swimming at the 2017 Summer Universiade – Men's 50 metre butterfly =

Men's 50 metre butterfly at the 2017 Summer Universiade
- Venue: National Taiwan Sport University Arena
- Location: Taipei, Taiwan
- Dates: 20 August (heats and semifinals); 21 August (final)
- Competitors: 77 from 46 nations
- Winning time: 22.90

Medalists
gold medal	Andriy Hovorov	Ukraine
silver medal	Andrey Zhilkin	Russia
bronze medal	Henrique Martins	Brazil
bronze medal	Andrii Khloptsov	Ukraine

The Men's 50 metre butterfly competition at the 2017 Summer Universiade was held on 20 and 21 August 2017.

== Records ==
Prior to the competition, the existing world and Universiade records were as follows.

World record	Rafael Muñoz (ESP)	22.43	Málaga, Spain	5 April 2009
Competition record	Jason Dunford (KEN)	23.09	Belgrade, Serbia	5 July 2009

The following new records were set during this competition.

Date	Event	Name	Nationality	Time	Record
21 August	Final	Andriy Hovorov	Ukraine	22.90	UR

== Results ==
=== Heats ===
The heats were held on 20 August at 11:01.

Rank	Heat	Lane	Name	Nationality	Time	Notes
1	10	4	Andriy Hovorov	Ukraine	23.52	Q
2	9	3	Shunichi Nakao	Japan	23.74	Q
3	8	4	Guilherme Rosolen	Brazil	23.76	Q
4	8	2	Aleksandr Sadovnikov	Russia	23.79	Q
4	9	4	Henrique Martins	Brazil	23.79	Q
6	10	3	Andrey Zhilkin	Russia	23.86	Q
7	10	5	Andrii Khloptsov	Ukraine	23.87	Q
8	9	5	Yahor Dodaleu	Belarus	23.96	Q
9	8	5	Konrad Czerniak	Poland	23.97	Q
10	9	2	Marcus Schlesinger	Israel	24.05	Q
11	8	3	Brayden Mccarthy	Australia	24.08	Q
12	7	1	Nao Horomura	Japan	24.09	Q
13	7	3	Zane Waddell	South Africa	24.16	Q
14	10	6	Andrea Vergani	Italy	24.21	Q
15	8	6	Justin Lynch	United States	24.25	Q, WD
16	9	7	Conor Brines	Ireland	24.26	QSO
16	10	7	Jan Šefl	Czech Republic	24.26	QSO
18	6	8	Long Gutiérrez	Mexico	24.29	
18	8	8	Ryan Coetzee	South Africa	24.29	
20	10	2	Pulai Bence	Hungary	24.31	
21	9	1	Ari-Pekka Liukkonen	Finland	24.37	
21	9	6	Tadas Duškinas	Lithuania	24.37	
23	10	1	Yang Jung-doo	South Korea	24.39	
24	9	8	Bence Gyárfás	Hungary	24.41	
25	8	7	Jesper Björk	Sweden	24.42	
26	5	3	Kaan Ayar	Turkey	24.43	
27	7	2	Zach Harting	United States	24.45	
28	10	8	Marius Radu	Romania	24.47	
29	8	1	Michał Poprawa	Poland	24.50	
30	7	5	Jorge Iga	Mexico	24.58	
31	6	5	Maximilian Oswald	Germany	24.60	
32	6	3	Guido Buscaglia	Argentina	24.67	
32	6	2	Josiah Binnema	Canada	24.67	
34	7	8	Fotios Koliopoulos	Greece	24.77	
34	6	4	Nikolajs Maskaļenko	Latvia	24.77	
36	4	5	Laurent Bams	Netherlands	24.81	
37	7	7	Alexander Kunert	Germany	24.89	
38	4	1	Cevin Siim	Estonia	24.91	
39	4	7	Daniel Namir	Israel	24.93	
40	7	4	Sascha Subarsky	Austria	24.95	
41	5	6	Chu Chen-ping	Chinese Taipei	25.02	
42	6	6	Stefanos Dimitriadis	Greece	25.05	
43	5	4	Giacomo Carini	Italy	25.06	
44	6	7	David Arias	Colombia	25.07	
45	5	5	Chang Kuo-chi	Chinese Taipei	25.09	
46	4	3	Josef Moser	Czech Republic	25.10	
46	5	8	Nicolás Deferrari	Argentina	25.10	
48	4	2	Zhang Shimeng	China	25.13	
49	4	6	Jaakko Rautalin	Finland	25.14	
50	5	2	Lee Tae-gu	South Korea	25.19	
51	4	4	Jin Yuli	China	25.20	
52	7	6	Nicholas Brown	Australia	25.24	
53	5	7	Ho Tin Long	Hong Kong	25.67	
54	6	1	Kemal Arda Gürdal	Turkey	25.91	
55	3	4	Muhammad Hamgari	Indonesia	26.00	
56	3	2	Muhammad Alamzah	Indonesia	26.04	
57	4	8	Daniel Mitsumasu	Peru	26.04	
58	2	3	Carlos Orihuela	Paraguay	26.14	
59	3	5	Mahieddine Galdem	Algeria	26.21	
60	3	6	Gershwin Greene	Bahamas	26.25	
61	3	3	Joshua Gold	Estonia	26.31	
62	3	7	Ho Wei Ming	Singapore	26.49	
63	5	1	Mhikcoloe Abina	Philippines	26.60	
64	2	4	Valts Feldbergs	Latvia	26.64	
65	2	5	Nicholas Sammut	Malta	26.85	
66	3	1	Tan Zhe Xian Dion	Singapore	27.07	
67	3	8	Mohammad Baghdadi	Lebanon	27.21	
68	1	5	Kalana Weeramuni	Sri Lanka	27.23	
69	1	4	Jeffrey Galea	Malta	27.86	
70	2	2	Daniel Bou Diab	Lebanon	28.15	
71	1	6	Nidhal Al Harrasi	Oman	28.59	
72	1	7	Rajitha Herath	Sri Lanka	28.82	
73	2	6	Enrique Nava	Bolivia	28.93	
74	1	2	Daisuke Ssegwanyi	Uganda	29.58	
75	2	7	Roger Giron	Philippines	29.80	
76	1	3	Conrado Sacco	Paraguay	29.84	
77	1	8	Ayman Al Qasmi	Oman	30.14	
	1	1	Ali Nazari	Afghanistan	DNS	
	2	1	Izon Alfred	Nigeria	DNS	
	2	8	Forsight Osamezu	Nigeria	DNS	

=== Swim-off ===
Rank	Lane	Name	Nationality	Time	Notes
1	5	Conor Brines	Ireland	24.07	Q
2	4	Jan Šefl	Czech Republic	24.17	

=== Semifinals ===
The semifinals were held on 20 August at 20:02.

==== Semifinal 1 ====
Rank	Lane	Name	Nationality	Time	Notes
1	3	Andrey Zhilkin	Russia	23.45	Q
2	4	Shunichi Nakao	Japan	23.57	Q
3	5	Aleksandr Sadovnikov	Russia	23.71	Q
4	2	Marcus Schlesinger	Israel	23.72	Q
5	8	Jan Šefl	Czech Republic	23.79	
6	7	Nao Horomura	Japan	24.19	
7	1	Andrea Vergani	Italy	24.20	
	6	Yahor Dodaleu	Belarus	DNS	

==== Semifinal 2 ====
Rank	Lane	Name	Nationality	Time	Notes
1	4	Andriy Hovorov	Ukraine	23.17	Q
2	6	Andrii Khloptsov	Ukraine	23.60	Q
3	3	Henrique Martins	Brazil	23.61	Q
4	2	Konrad Czerniak	Poland	23.76	Q
5	5	Guilherme Rosolen	Brazil	23.92	
6	7	Brayden Mccarthy	Australia	24.02	
7	8	Conor Brines	Ireland	24.10	
8	1	Zane Waddell	South Africa	24.48	

=== Final ===
The final was held on 21 August at 19:02.

Rank	Lane	Name	Nationality	Time	Notes
1st place, gold medalist(s)	4	Andriy Hovorov	Ukraine	22.90	UR
2nd place, silver medalist(s)	5	Andrey Zhilkin	Russia	23.40	
3rd place, bronze medalist(s)	2	Henrique Martins	Brazil	23.54	
3rd place, bronze medalist(s)	6	Andrii Khloptsov	Ukraine	23.54	
5	8	Konrad Czerniak	Poland	23.62	
6	3	Shunichi Nakao	Japan	23.65	
7	1	Marcus Schlesinger	Israel	23.80	
8	7	Aleksandr Sadovnikov	Russia	23.87	
