= Brazil at the 2017 Summer Universiade =

- IOC code: BRA
- NOC: Confederação Brasileira do Desporto Universitário
- Website: www.cbdu.org.br

in Taipei, Taiwan 19 August 2017 – 30 August 2017
- Competitors: 180 in 14 sports
- Flag bearer: Maicon Andrade
- Medals Ranked 28th: Gold 2 Silver 4 Bronze 6 Total 12

Summer Universiade appearances (overview)
- 1959; 1961; 1963; 1965; 1967; 1970; 1973; 1975; 1977; 1979; 1981; 1983; 1985; 1987; 1989; 1991; 1993; 1995; 1997; 1999; 2001; 2003; 2005; 2007; 2009; 2011; 2013; 2015; 2017; 2019; 2021; 2025; 2027

Brazil participated at the 2017 Summer Universiade in Taipei, Taiwan.

== Medalists ==
Medal	Name	Sport	Event	Date
Gold	Bárbara Timo	Judo	Women's –70 kg	21 August
Gold	Brazil women's national football team: Maike Weber; Bruna Calderan; Giovanna Rocha; Tuani Ramos; Patrícia Camargo; Chaiane Locatelli; Giovanna de Oliveira; Diany Martins; Carla Nunes; Bianca Lima; Julia Bianchi; Gabrielli Croco; Mariana Alverte; Gabrielle Costa; Amanda Ferreira; Nathane Fabem; Rosani Soares; Natália Silva; Roberta Schroeder	Football	Women's tournament	28 August
Silver	Gabriela Chibana	Judo	Women's –48 kg	23 August
Silver	Eleudis Valentim	Judo	Women's –52 kg	22 August
Silver	Maicon Andrade	Taekwondo	Men's +87 kg	24 August
Silver	Ítalo Duarte	Swimming	Men's 50 m freestyle	26 August
Bronze	Vinicius Panini	Judo	Men's –81 kg	21 August
Bronze	Tamires Crude	Judo	Women's –57 kg	22 August
Bronze	Henrique Martins	Swimming	Men's 50 m butterfly	22 August
Bronze	Henrique Martins	Swimming	Men's 100 m butterfly	25 August
Bronze	Ruan Isquierdo	Judo	Men's open weight	23 August
Bronze	Allan Kuwabara; Marcelo Fuzita; Lincoln Kanemoto; Vinicius Panini; Gustavo Assis; Gabriel Gouveia; Ruan Isquierdo	Judo	Men's team	24 August

== Competitors ==
Sport	Men	Women	Total
Athletics	15	7	22
Badminton	2	2	4
Diving	2	2	4
Fencing	3	3	6
Gymnastics	0	2	2
Football	20	19	39
Judo	7	7	14
Swimming	17	11	28
Table tennis	2	2	4
Taekwondo	8	9	17
Tennis	2	2	4
Volleyball	12	12	24
Weightlifting	3	2	5
Wushu	5	2	7
Total	98	82	180

== Athletics ==
Key

- Q = Qualified for the next round
- q = Qualified for the next round as a fastest loser or, in field events, by position without achieving the qualifying target
- N/A = Round not applicable for the event

Men
Track & road events

Athlete	Event	Round 1		Round 2		Semifinal		Final	
Athlete	Event	Result	Rank	Result	Rank	Result	Rank	Result	Rank
Gabriel Constantino	100 m	10.56	23	Did not advance					
Aldemir da Silva Júnior	200 m	20.92	2 Q	—N/a		DSQ		Did not advance	
Aliffer dos Santos	200 m	21.84	=31	—N/a		Did not advance			
Cleiton Abrão	800 m	1:51.23	15 Q	—N/a		1:54.16	23	Did not advance	
Pedro da Palma Júnior	800 m	1:53.75	35	—N/a		Did not advance			
Gabriel Constantino	110 m hurdles	13.88	3 Q	—N/a		13.94	8 Q	DSQ	
Jonatha Paraizo	110 m hurdles	14.40	18	—N/a		Did not advance			
Artur Terezan	400 m hurdles	50.69	8 q	—N/a		51.89	20	Did not advance	
Gabriel Constantino; Aldemir da Silva Júnior; Aliffer dos Santos; Jonatha Paraizo	4 × 100 m relay	39.80	9	—N/a				Did not advance	
Cleiton Abrão; Gabriel Constantino; Pedro da Palma Júnior; Aldemir da Silva Júnior; Artur Terezan	4 × 400 m relay	3:15.27	15	—N/a				Did not advance	

Field events

Athlete	Event	Qualification		Final	
Athlete	Event	Distance	Position	Distance	Position
Bruno Spinelli	Pole vault	5.30	=3 Q	5.20	8
Tiago da Silva	Long jump	7.63	11 q	7.64	5
Lucas dos Santos	Long jump	7.89	2 q	7.50	9
Mateus de Sá	Triple jump	16.01	8 q	16.08	8
Jean Rosa	Triple jump	16.20	6 q	16.42	6
Willian Dourado	Shot put	19.51	5 Q	19.25	7
Douglas dos Reis	Discus throw	55.94	11 q	59.37	7

Combined events

Athlete	Event		100 m	LJ	SP	HJ	400 m	110H	DT	PV	JT	1500 m	Final	Rank
Jefferson Santos	Decathlon	Result	11.47	6.80	14.43	1.92	DNF	DNS			—		DNF	
Jefferson Santos	Decathlon	Points	759	767	755	731	0	—					DNF	

Women
Track & road events

Athlete	Event	Round 1		Final	
Athlete	Event	Result	Rank	Result	Rank
July da Silva	1500 m	4:27.15	13	Did not advance	
Tatiane da Silva	3000 m steeplechase	—N/a		10:22.21	9
Valdilene Silva	Half marathon	—N/a		1:18:29	8

Field events

Athlete	Event	Qualification		Final	
Athlete	Event	Distance	Position	Distance	Position
Mariana Marcelino	Hammer throw	62.07	9 Q	65.39	7
Rafaela Dias	Javelin throw	51.18	20	Did not advance	
Daniella Lorenzon	Javelin throw	51.77	19	Did not advance	

Combined events

Athlete	Event		100H	HJ	SP	200 m	LJ	JT	800 m	Final	Rank
Vanessa Spínola	Heptathlon	Result	15.20	1.68	12.61	25.55	5.63	38.60	2:23.59	5337	5
Vanessa Spínola	Heptathlon	Points	815	830	702	837	738	640	775	5337	5

== Diving ==
Men

Athlete	Event	Preliminaries		Semifinals		Final	
Athlete	Event	Points	Rank	Points	Rank	Points	Rank
Jackson Rondinelli	1 m springboard	300.65	22	Did not advance			
Jackson Rondinelli	10 m platform	271.10	18 Q	368.45	12 Q	336.30	12
Ian Matos	3 m springboard	346.15	21 Q	292.25	18	Did not advance	

Women

Athlete	Event	Preliminaries		Semifinals		Final	
Athlete	Event	Points	Rank	Points	Rank	Points	Rank
Tammy Galera	1 m springboard	197.85	28	Did not advance			
Tammy Galera	3 m springboard	204.55	29	Did not advance			
Luana Moreira	1 m springboard	249.05	5 Q	256.85	4 (B)	Did not advance	
Luana Moreira	3 m springboard	256.15	15 Q	248.85	11 Q	225.80	10
Tammy Galera; Luana Moreira	3 m synchronized springboard	—N/a				265.02	6

== Football ==
=== Men's tournament ===
Preliminary round

Pos	Team	Pld	W	D	L	GF	GA	GD	Pts	Qualification
1	Russia	3	3	0	0	14	2	+12	9	Elimination round
2	Italy	3	2	0	1	4	3	+1	6	Elimination round
3	Brazil	3	1	0	2	7	5	+2	3	Classification round
4	United States	3	0	0	3	0	15	−15	0	Classification round

18 August 2017
19:30

Brazil	2–3	Russia
De Pauli 79' (pen.); Rodrigues dos Reis 88'	Report	Sergeyev 15'; Ustinov 68'; Ivashchenko 90+5'

Hsinchu County Second Stadium, Hsinchu County
Referee: Takuto Okabe (Japan)

21 August 2017
19:30

Brazil	5–0	United States
Lopes da Silva Junior 2'; De Pauli 11' (pen.); Gomes da Mata 56'; Gomes Paranaguá 67' (pen.); Rodrigues dos Reis 81'	Report

Chang Gung University Stadium, Taoyuan City
Referee: Sivakorn Pu-Udom (Thailand)

23 August 2017
16:00

Italy	2–0	Brazil
Taviani 77'; Favo 90+4'	Report

Fu Jen Catholic University Stadium, New Taipei City
Referee: Shukri Hussain Al-Hunfush (Saudi Arabia)

9th–16th place

25 August 2017
16:00

Malaysia	1–3	Brazil
Tumin 55'	Report	De Pauli 72', 90+2'; De Sousa Neto 76'

Hsinchu County Second Stadium, Hsinchu County
Referee: Kim Woo-sung (South Korea)

9th–12th place semifinals

27 August 2017
16:00

South Korea	3–3	Brazil
Cho 27'; Lee K-h 74', 88'	Report	Araujo Costa 10', 64'; Silva Rocha 29'
Penalties
Doo (penalty missed); Cho (penalty scored); Lee K-h (penalty scored); Park (penalty missed); Kang (penalty scored); Yu (penalty scored); Lee S-y (penalty scored); Lee S-m (penalty scored); Jeong (penalty scored); Song (penalty missed)	7–8	(penalty scored) De Pauli; (penalty scored) Gomes Paranaguá; (penalty scored) Rezende Assis; (penalty missed) De Souza Neto; (penalty missed) Rodrigues dos Reis; (penalty scored) Ladeia Jerônimo; (penalty scored) Silva Rocha; (penalty scored) Coelho Souza; (penalty scored) De Almeida; (penalty scored) De Mattos Robertoni

Fu Jen Catholic University Stadium, New Taipei City
Referee: Pranjal Banerjee (India)

9th place match

29 August 2017
19:30

Canada	3–4	Brazil
MacNaughton 2'; Park 7'; MacMillan 63'	Report	Sabino da Silva 4'; De Pauli 30' (pen.); Silva Rocha 34'; Rodrigues dos Reis 86'

Chang Gung University Stadium, Taoyuan City
Referee: Hussein Abo Yehia (Lebanon)

=== Women's tournament ===
Preliminary round

Team	Pld	W	D	L	GF	GA	GD	Pts
Brazil	2	2	0	0	20	1	+19	6
Japan	2	1	0	1	15	3	+12	3
Colombia	2	0	0	2	0	31	−31	0

Qualified for the Quarterfinals

18 August 2017
16:00

Brazil	17–0	Colombia
Oliveira 10', 15', 35'; Nunes 12', 18', 33', 76'; Locatelli 29'; Martins 31'; Ramos 37'; Ferreira 43'; Costa 50'; Calderan 60'; Fabem 61', 80', 82', 84'	Report

Chang Gung University Stadium, Taoyuan City
Referee: Lee Yi Chi (Chinese Taipei)

22 August 2017
19:30

Japan	1–3	Brazil
Yamaguchi 90'	Report	Lima 13'; Martins 15'; Nunes 49'

Chang Gung University Stadium, Taoyuan City
Referee: Trang Bui Thi Thu (Vietnam)

Quarterfinals

24 August 2017
19:30

Canada	0–1	Brazil
	Report	Nunes 68' (pen.)

Hsinchu County Second Stadium, Hsinchu County
Referee: Doumouh Al-Bakkar (Lebanon)

Semifinals

26 August 2017
19:30

Russia	0–1	Brazil
	Report	Oliveira 29'

Fu Jen Catholic University Stadium, New Taipei City
Referee: Yoshimi Yamashita (Japan)

Final

28 August 2017
19:30

Japan	0–1 (a.e.t.)	Brazil
	Report	Martins 112'

Fu Jen Catholic University Stadium, New Taipei City
Referee: Miss Pansa Chaisanit (Thailand)

== Judo ==
Men

Athlete	Event	Round of 32	Round of 16	Quarterfinals	Semifinals	Repechage 1&2	Repechage 3	Repechage final	Final / BM	
Athlete	Event	Opposition Result	Opposition Result	Opposition Result	Opposition Result	Opposition Result	Opposition Result	Opposition Result	Opposition Result	Rank
Allan Kuwabara	−60 kg	Rahima (ISR); L 01S1–10S1	Did not advance							
Marcelo Fuzita	−66 kg	Matkerimov (KGZ); W 0–0	Isoda (JPN); L 12–00S1	Did not advance		Vinogradov (ISR); W 10–00	Abdulzhalilov (RUS); L 00–02S1	Did not advance		
Lincoln Kanemoto	−73 kg	Meulensteen (NED); L 01–10	Did not advance							
Vinicius Panini	−81 kg	Regis (ITA); W 01S2–00S1	Missin (KAZ); W 01S2–00S1	Lappinagov (RUS); L 00S1–02	Did not advance	Bye	Fujiwara (JPN); W 10S2–00S1	Chaparyan (ARM); W 01–00S1	Gotonoaga (MDA); W 12–00S1	3rd place, bronze medalist(s)
Gustavo Assis	−90 kg	Kuusik (EST); L 00S3–10S1	Did not advance							
Gabriel Gouveia	−100 kg	Kim L-h (KOR); L 00S3–10S1	Did not advance			Islam (PAK); W 10–00	Iddir (FRA); W 10S2–00S1	Domanski (POL); L 00–11S1	Did not advance	
Ruan Isquierdo	+100 kg	Bye	Kageura (JPN); L 00–10	Did not advance		Mettis (EST); W 12S1–00	Turgynaliyev (KAZ); W 11–01S1	Bouizgarne (GER); W 11S1–00S1	Koleśnyk (UKR); L 00–01	5
Ruan Isquierdo	Open	Bye	Orazbayev (KAZ); L 00S1–01S1	Did not advance		Grabowski (POL); W 10–00	Boldpurev (MGL); W 01S1–00S1	Rudnyk (UKR); W 10–00S1	Kumrić (CRO); W 11–01	3rd place, bronze medalist(s)
Allan Kuwabara; Marcelo Fuzita; Lincoln Kanemoto; Vinicius Panini; Gustavo Assis; Gabriel Gouveia; Ruan Isquierdo	Team	United States (USA); W 5–0	France (FRA); W 3–2	South Korea (KOR); W 3–2	Russia (RUS); L 1–4	—N/a		Bye	Poland (POL); W 5–0	3rd place, bronze medalist(s)

Women

Athlete	Event	Round of 32	Round of 16	Quarterfinals	Semifinals	Repechage 1&2	Repechage 3	Repechage final	Final / BM	
Athlete	Event	Opposition Result	Opposition Result	Opposition Result	Opposition Result	Opposition Result	Opposition Result	Opposition Result	Opposition Result	Rank
Gabriela Chibana	−48 kg	Bye	Puliyellumpurath (IND); W 02S1–00S2	Costa (POR); W 13–00S1	Persidskaia (RUS); W 02S1–00S2	Bye			Umekita (JPN); L 00S1–10	2nd place, silver medalist(s)
Eleudis Valentim	−52 kg	Jatau (NGR); W 00–00	Ganbold (MGL); W 10S1–00	González (CHI); W 10–00	Pierucci (ITA); W 01S2–00S1	Bye			Tatsukawa (JPN); L 00–10S1	2nd place, silver medalist(s)
Tamires Crude	−57 kg	Tseregbaatar (MGL); W 01S1–00S2	Lee H-y (TPE); W 10–00S1	Murai (JPN); L 00S1–01S1	Did not advance	Bye	Ilkiv (UKR); W 02–00	Schmidt (GER); W 01S1–00	Righetti (ITA); W 01S2–00	3rd place, bronze medalist(s)
Carolina Pereira	−63 kg	Snir (ISR); L 00S1–01S1	Did not advance							
Bárbara Timo	−70 kg	Munkhbat (MGL); W 11–00	Paissoni (ITA); W 01S1–00	Hofman (POL); W 10–00	Maekelburg (GER); W 03S1–00S1	Bye			Niizoe (JPN); W 01S2–00S2	1st place, gold medalist(s)
Isadora Pereira	−78 kg	Bye	Wang S-c (TPE); W 10–00S1	Malonga (FRA); W 11–00S1	Ferrari (ITA); L 00–03	Bye			Ziech (GER); L 00–10	5
Sibilla Jacinto	+78 kg	Bye	Han M-j (KOR); L 00S2–11	Did not advance		Lianichenko (RUS); W 10S1–00S3	Inoue (JPN); L 00S1–10	Did not advance		
Sibilla Jacinto	Open	Bye	Komal (IND); W 10–00	Kim J-y (KOR); L 00S1–11	Did not advance	Bye	Bredeston (ARG); W 10–00	Zaleczna (POL); W 11–00	Pakenytė (LTU); L 00–10	5
Gabriela Chibana; Eleudis Valentim; Tamires Crude; Carolina Pereira; Bárbara Timo; Isadora Pereira; Sibilla Jacinto	Team	Bye	France (FRA); L 2–3	Did not advance						

== Swimming ==
Men

Athlete	Event	Heat		Semifinal		Final	
Athlete	Event	Time	Rank	Time	Rank	Time	Rank
Guilherme Basseto	50 m backstroke	25.91	20	Did not advance			
Guilherme Basseto	100 m backstroke	56.68	30	Did not advance			
Victor Colonese	10 km marathon	—N/a				1:57:15.2	7
Leonardo de Deus	200 m backstroke	2:02.20	17	Did not advance			
Leonardo de Deus	200 m butterfly	1:58.94	8 Q	1:57.10	5 Q	1:56.29	4
Allan do Carmo	10 km marathon	—N/a				1:55:24.2	4
Ítalo Duarte	50 m freestyle	22.27	4 Q	21.93	1 Q	22.05	2nd place, silver medalist(s)
Lucas Kanieski	400 m freestyle	3:56.27	19	—N/a		Did not advance	
Lucas Kanieski	800 m freestyle	8:19.25	22	—N/a		Did not advance	
Lucas Kanieski	1500 m freestyle	15:52.67	19	—N/a		Did not advance	
Vinícius Lanza	100 m butterfly	53.03	9 Q	52.62	7 Q	52.59	7
Vinícius Lanza	200 m butterfly	1:59.71	14 Q	2:00.08	14	Did not advance	
Vinícius Lanza	200 m individual medley	2:01.65	8 Q	2:01.58	10	Did not advance	
Henrique Martins	50 m backstroke	25.86	19	Did not advance			
Henrique Martins	50 m butterfly	23.79	=4 Q	23.61	5 Q	23.54	3rd place, bronze medalist(s)
Henrique Martins	100 m butterfly	52.51	2 Q	52.16	2 Q	51.96	3rd place, bronze medalist(s)
Felipe Monni	50 m breaststroke	27.66	5 Q	27.69	6 Q	27.81	7
Felipe Monni	100 m breaststroke	1:01.67	16 Q	1:01.60	13	Did not advance	
Felipe Monni	200 m breaststroke	2:19.12	35	Did not advance			
Guilherme Ocampo	50 m freestyle	22.81	23	Did not advance			
Giuliano Rocco	200 m freestyle	1:50.40	15 Q	1:50.20	15	Did not advance	
Giuliano Rocco	400 m freestyle	3:55.61	16	—N/a		Did not advance	
Raphael Rodrigues	50 m breaststroke	27.95	8 Q	27.77	7 Q	27.93	8
Raphael Rodrigues	100 m breaststroke	1:01.32	10 Q	1:01.75	14	Did not advance	
Raphael Rodrigues	200 m breaststroke	2:16.89	=26	Did not advance			
Guilherme Rosolen	50 m butterfly	23.76	3 Q	23.92	10	Did not advance	
Gabriel Santos	100 m freestyle	49.46	5 Q	48.71	3 Q	48.84	4
Felipe Souza	200 m freestyle	1:51.28	25	Did not advance			
Pedro Spajari	100 m freestyle	48.93	3 Q	49.09	5 Q	49.17	6
Leonardo Alcover; Henrique Martins; Gabriel Santos; Pedro Spajari	4 × 100 m freestyle relay	3:17.44	4 Q	—N/a		3:16.51	6
Leonardo de Deus; Giuliano Rocco; Felipe Souza; Pedro Spajari	4 × 200 m freestyle relay	DSQ		—N/a		Did not advance	
Leonardo de Deus; Henrique Martins; Raphael Rodrigues; Gabriel Santos; Vinícius Lanza*; Felipe Monni*; Pedro Spajari*	4 × 100 m medley relay	3:37.46	1 Q	—N/a		3:36.71	5

*Heats only

Women

Athlete	Event	Heat		Semifinal		Final	
Athlete	Event	Time	Rank	Time	Rank	Time	Rank
Daynara de Paula	50 m butterfly	26.91	9 Q	26.81	9	Did not advance	
Daynara de Paula	100 m butterfly	59.95	8 Q	59.66	9	Did not advance	
Pãmela de Souza	50 m breaststroke	33.46	23	Did not advance			
Pãmela de Souza	100 m breaststroke	1:11.44	20	Did not advance			
Pãmela de Souza	200 m breaststroke	2:31.67	12 Q	2:31.29	13	Did not advance	
Daiene Dias	100 m butterfly	59.53	4 Q	59.04	4 Q	59.50	6
Maria Heitmann	400 m freestyle	4:20.61	19	—N/a		Did not advance	
Graciele Herrmann	50 m freestyle	25.67	11 Q	25.18	3 Q	25.26	4
Viviane Jungblut	1500 m freestyle	16:28.17	7 Q	—N/a		16:22.48	6
Viviane Jungblut	10 km marathon	—N/a				2:04:39.3	4
Manuella Lyrio	100 m freestyle	55.74	10 Q	55.80	15	Did not advance	
Manuella Lyrio	200 m freestyle	2:00.71	9 Q	1:59.08	3 Q	1:58.64	4
Manuella Lyrio	200 m butterfly	DNS		Did not advance			
Betina Lorscheitter	10 km marathon	—N/a				2:14:52.4	14
Alessandra Marchioro	50 m freestyle	25.38	4 Q	25.36	6 Q	25.38	7
Alessandra Marchioro	50 m breaststroke	33.06	20	Did not advance			
Larissa Oliveira	100 m freestyle	55.38	5 Q	55.04	3 Q	55.00	5
Larissa Oliveira	200 m freestyle	2:01.20	12 Q	2:00.24	12	Did not advance	
Bruna Rocha	50 m butterfly	26.78	=5 Q	26.92	11	Did not advance	
Daynara de Paula; Manuella Lyrio; Alessandra Marchioro; Larissa Oliveira	4 × 100 m freestyle relay	3:42.23	3 Q	—N/a		3:41.52	5
Daynara de Paula; Maria Heitmann; Viviane Jungblut; Larissa Oliveira	4 × 200 m freestyle relay	8:07.66	8 Q	—N/a		8:05.37	8
Daynara de Paula; Pãmela de Souza; Daiene Dias; Manuella Lyrio	4 × 100 m medley relay	DNS		—N/a		Did not advance	

== Tennis ==
Athlete	Event	Preliminary	Round of 64	Round of 32	Round of 16	Quarterfinals	Semifinals	Final / BM	
Athlete	Event	Opposition Result	Opposition Result	Opposition Result	Opposition Result	Opposition Result	Opposition Result	Opposition Result	Rank
Lucas Rocha	Men's singles	Bye	Nel (RSA); W 7–5, 6–7^{(8–10)}, 6–3	Safiullin (RUS); L 2–6, 0–6	Did not advance				
Antonin Scaff	Men's singles	Bye	Stjern (SWE); L 2–6, 1–6 Consolation; Bayreddy (IND); L WO	Did not advance					
Lucas Rocha; Antonin Scaff	Men's doubles	—N/a		Wong C-h / Yeung P-l (HKG); L 4–6, 2–6	Did not advance				
Fabiana Asprino	Women's singles	Bye	Maheta (IND); L 0–6, 1–6	Did not advance					
Letícia Moura	Women's singles	Bye	Lee Y-h (TPE); L 4–6, 0–6	Did not advance					
Fabiana Asprino; Letícia Moura	Women's doubles	—N/a		Mendesová / Rutarová (CZE); L 1–6, 2–6	Did not advance				
Letícia Moura; Antonin Scaff	Mixed doubles	—N/a	Bye	Rey / Sommer (SUI); L 2–6, 0–6	Did not advance				

== Volleyball ==
=== Men's tournament ===
Preliminary round

Pos	Team	Pld	W	L	Pts	SW	SL	SR	SPW	SPL	SPR	Qualification
1	Japan	4	3	1	9	11	7	1.571	421	374	1.126	Quarterfinals
2	Brazil	4	3	1	7	9	7	1.286	374	376	0.995	Quarterfinals
3	France	4	2	2	7	9	7	1.286	374	358	1.045	9th–16th place
4	Chinese Taipei	4	2	2	5	8	8	1.000	356	360	0.989	9th–16th place
5	United States	4	0	4	2	4	12	0.333	321	378	0.849	17th–22nd place

Date	Time		Score		Set 1	Set 2	Set 3	Set 4	Set 5	Total	Report
21 Aug	18:00	Brazil	3–2	Japan	32–34	26–24	25–22	18–25	15–13	116–118	P2 P3
22 Aug	20:00	Chinese Taipei	3–0	Brazil	25–20	25–17	25–21			75–58	P2 P3
24 Aug	18:00	Brazil	3–2	France	21–25	21–25	26–24	25–18	27–25	120–117	P2 P3
25 Aug	18:00	United States	0–3	Brazil	19–25	28–30	19–25			66–80	P2 P3

Quarterfinals

Date	Time		Score		Set 1	Set 2	Set 3	Set 4	Set 5	Total	Report
27 Aug	15:00	Brazil	1–3	Ukraine	20–25	25–13	21–25	16–25		82–88	P2 P3

5th–8th place semifinals

Date	Time		Score		Set 1	Set 2	Set 3	Set 4	Set 5	Total	Report
28 Aug	13:00	Czech Republic	1–3	Brazil	25–23	18–25	20–25	21–25		84–98	P2 P3

5th place match

Date	Time		Score		Set 1	Set 2	Set 3	Set 4	Set 5	Total	Report
29 Aug	14:00	Argentina	1–3	Brazil	24–26	17–25	25–15	22–25		88–91	P2 P3

=== Women's tournament ===
Preliminary round

Pos	Team	Pld	W	L	Pts	SW	SL	SR	SPW	SPL	SPR	Qualification
1	Russia	3	3	0	9	9	1	9.000	246	180	1.367	Quarterfinals
2	Finland	3	2	1	6	6	3	2.000	204	182	1.121	Quarterfinals
3	Brazil	3	1	2	3	4	6	0.667	213	219	0.973	
4	Mexico	3	0	3	0	0	9	0.000	143	225	0.636	

Date	Time		Score		Set 1	Set 2	Set 3	Set 4	Set 5	Total	Report
21 Aug	18:00	Brazil	0–3	Finland	21–25	19–25	16–25			56–75	P2 P3
22 Aug	18:00	Brazil	3–0	Mexico	25–21	25–11	25–16			75–48	P2 P3
23 Aug	20:00	Russia	3–1	Brazil	21–25	25–15	25–21	25–21		96–82	P2 P3

9th–16th place quarterfinals

Date	Time		Score		Set 1	Set 2	Set 3	Set 4	Set 5	Total	Report
25 Aug	13:00	Brazil	3–0	Latvia	25–12	25–17	25–23			75–52	P2 P3

9th–16th place quarterfinals

Date	Time		Score		Set 1	Set 2	Set 3	Set 4	Set 5	Total	Report
26 Aug	15:00	Brazil	3–0	Switzerland	29–27	25–11	25–14			79–52	P2 P3

9th place match

Date	Time		Score		Set 1	Set 2	Set 3	Set 4	Set 5	Total	Report
27 Aug	20:00	United States	1–3	Brazil	25–23	22–25	14–25	16–25		77–98	P2 P3

== Weightlifting ==
Athlete	Event	Snatch		Clean & jerk		Total	Rank
Athlete	Event	Result	Rank	Result	Rank	Total	Rank
Gabriel Fernandes	Men's 62 kg	105	11	130	9	235	9
Rafael Fernandes	Men's 69 kg	121	=15	146	15	267	15
Josué Lucas Ferreira	Men's 85 kg	146	9	—	—	—	DNF
Luana Oliveira	Women's 48 kg	76	4	94	5	170	4
Natasha Rosa	Women's 48 kg	65	=12	83	12	148	12
