= Swimming at the 2017 Summer Universiade – Women's 100 metre freestyle =

Women's 100 metre freestyle at the 2017 Summer Universiade
- Venue: National Taiwan Sport University Arena
- Location: Taipei, Taiwan
- Dates: 21 August (heats and semifinals); 22 August (final)
- Competitors: 54 from 36 nations
- Winning time: 54.10

Medalists
gold medal	Siobhán Haughey	Hong Kong
silver medal	Maria Kameneva	Russia
bronze medal	Arina Openysheva	Russia

The Women's 100 metre freestyle competition at the 2017 Summer Universiade was held on 21 and 22 August 2017.

== Records ==
Prior to the competition, the existing world and Universiade records were as follows.

World record	Sarah Sjöström (SWE)	51.71	Budapest, Hungary	23 July 2017
Competition record	Aliaksandra Herasimenia (BLR)	53.50	Kazan, Russia	12 July 2013

== Results ==
=== Heats ===
The heats were held on 21 August at 9:57.

Rank	Heat	Lane	Name	Nationality	Time	Notes
1	8	6	Maria Kameneva	Russia	55.04	Q
2	7	5	Caroline Baldwin	United States	55.09	Q
3	6	4	Siobhán Haughey	Hong Kong	55.18	Q
4	7	6	Lucy Hope	Great Britain	55.35	Q
5	6	6	Larissa Oliveira	Brazil	55.38	Q
6	8	4	Katerine Savard	Canada	55.48	Q
7	6	5	Veronica Burchill	United States	55.59	Q
8	8	3	Anna Hopkin	Great Britain	55.60	Q
9	6	3	Arina Openysheva	Russia	55.70	Q
10	8	5	Manuella Lyrio	Brazil	55.74	Q
11	8	2	Jacqueline Keire	Canada	55.76	Q
12	7	3	Chihiro Igarashi	Japan	55.77	Q
13	6	7	Gemma Cooney	Australia	55.79	Q
14	7	4	Evelyn Verrasztó	Hungary	55.89	Q
15	7	2	Aglaia Pezzato	Italy	56.07	Q
16	6	2	Laura Letrari	Italy	56.29	Q
17	7	7	Laura Taylor	Australia	56.38	
18	8	7	Assia Touati	France	56.42	
19	6	1	Choi Hae-min	South Korea	56.47	
20	7	1	Carina Doyle	New Zealand	56.66	
21	5	2	Kalina Gralewska	Poland	56.86	
21	8	8	Noémi Girardet	Switzerland	56.86	
23	5	4	Joanna Evans	Bahamas	56.99	
24	8	1	Ayu Iwamoto	Japan	57.27	
25	5	3	Georgia Marris	New Zealand	57.53	
26	5	1	Fanny Teijonsalo	Finland	57.55	
27	4	5	Martina Elhenická	Czech Republic	57.60	
28	4	4	Tam Hoi Lam	Hong Kong	57.74	
28	7	8	Joanna Cieślak	Poland	57.74	
30	4	6	Shahar Menahem	Israel	57.75	
31	5	5	Hwang Seo-jin	South Korea	57.90	
32	5	7	Mo Li-err	Chinese Taipei	57.95	
33	6	8	Emma Chelius	South Africa	57.98	
34	5	6	Elmira Ibraim	Kazakhstan	58.33	
35	4	7	María Belén Díaz	Argentina	58.41	
36	5	8	Jessica Cattaneo	Peru	58.63	
37	4	8	Amira Pilgrim	Trinidad and Tobago	59.09	
38	4	1	María Paola Muñoz	Colombia	59.10	
39	3	6	Wu Tong	China	59.21	
39	3	2	Xu Jue	China	59.71	
41	3	1	Tan Chi Yan	Macau	59.83	
42	3	4	Florencia Panzini	Argentina	1:00.17	
43	4	3	María Arrua	Paraguay	1:01.12	
44	3	3	Kathriana Gustianjani	Indonesia	1:01.30	
45	3	7	María Giraldo	Colombia	1:01.67	
46	4	2	Karen Riveros	Paraguay	1:01.97	
47	3	5	Jennifer Rizkallah	Lebanon	1:03.37	
48	2	5	Yeo Xiu Wen	Singapore	1:03.39	
49	3	8	Carolina Cazot	Uruguay	1:03.46	
50	1	5	Liisa Lodi	Estonia	1:04.66	
51	1	4	Gretel-Marie Siimar	Estonia	1:07.05	
52	2	6	Avice Meya	Uganda	1:08.65	
53	2	3	Trisha Oliveros	Philippines	1:10.33	
54	1	3	Joyce Palete	Philippines	1:12.06	
	2	7	Epebi Noah	Nigeria	DNS	
	2	2	Akina Kpiliboh	Nigeria	DNS	
	2	4	Sara Moualfi	Algeria	DNS	

=== Semifinals ===
The semifinals were held on 21 August at 19:07.

==== Semifinal 1 ====
Rank	Lane	Name	Nationality	Time	Notes
1	4	Caroline Baldwin	United States	54.95	Q
2	3	Katerine Savard	Canada	55.27	Q
3	7	Chihiro Igarashi	Japan	55.49	
4	5	Lucy Hope	Great Britain	55.59	
5	1	Evelyn Verrasztó	Hungary	55.64	
6	6	Anna Hopkin	Great Britain	55.72	
7	2	Manuella Lyrio	Brazil	55.80	
8	8	Laura Letrari	Italy	56.28	

==== Semifinal 2 ====
Rank	Lane	Name	Nationality	Time	Notes
1	5	Siobhán Haughey	Hong Kong	54.52	Q
2	3	Larissa Oliveira	Brazil	55.04	Q
3	4	Maria Kameneva	Russia	55.07	Q
3	6	Veronica Burchill	United States	55.07	Q
5	8	Aglaia Pezzato	Italy	55.41	Q
6	2	Arina Openysheva	Russia	55.42	Q
7	1	Gemma Cooney	Australia	55.54	
8	7	Jacqueline Keire	Canada	55.77	

=== Final ===
The final was held on 22 August at 20:20.

Rank	Lane	Name	Nationality	Time	Notes
1st place, gold medalist(s)	4	Siobhán Haughey	Hong Kong	54.10	
2nd place, silver medalist(s)	6	Maria Kameneva	Russia	54.37	
3rd place, bronze medalist(s)	8	Arina Openysheva	Russia	54.89	
4	7	Katerine Savard	Canada	54.98	
5	3	Larissa Oliveira	Brazil	55.00	
6	2	Veronica Burchill	United States	55.04	
7	1	Aglaia Pezzato	Italy	55.35	
7	5	Caroline Baldwin	United States	55.35	
