= Swimming at the 2017 Summer Universiade – Women's 200 metre freestyle =

Women's 200 metre freestyle at the 2017 Summer Universiade
- Venue: National Taiwan Sport University Arena
- Location: Taipei, Taiwan
- Dates: 24 August (heats and semifinals); 25 August (final)
- Competitors: 48 from 32 nations
- Winning time: 1:56.71

Medalists
gold medal	Siobhán Haughey	Hong Kong
silver medal	Katie Drabot	United States
bronze medal	Arina Openysheva	Russia

The Women's 200 metre freestyle competition at the 2017 Summer Universiade was held on 24 and 25 August 2017.

== Records ==
Prior to the competition, the existing world and Universiade records were as follows.

World record	Federica Pellegrini (ITA)	1:52.98	Rome, Italy	29 July 2009
Competition record	Viktoriya Andreyeva (RUS)	1:57.31	Kazan, Russia	15 July 2013

The following new records were set during this competition.

Date	Event	Name	Nationality	Time	Record
25 August	Final	Siobhán Haughey	Hong Kong	1:56.71	UR

== Results ==
=== Heats ===
The heats were held on 24 August at 9:13.

Rank	Heat	Lane	Name	Nationality	Time	Notes
1	6	3	Katie Drabot	United States	1:59.37	Q
2	5	5	Claire Rasmus	United States	1:59.93	Q
3	6	7	Joanna Evans	Bahamas	2:00.04	Q
4	6	5	Chihiro Igarashi	Japan	2:00.05	Q
5	6	4	Katerine Savard	Canada	2:00.24	Q
6	5	3	Kennedy Goss	Canada	2:00.41	Q
7	5	6	Kathryn Greenslade	Great Britain	2:00.42	Q
8	7	4	Siobhán Haughey	Hong Kong	2:00.61	Q
9	5	4	Manuella Lyrio	Brazil	2:00.71	Q
10	7	6	Arina Openysheva	Russia	2:00.98	Q
11	7	7	Alizée Morel	France	2:01.10	Q
12	7	2	Larissa Oliveira	Brazil	2:01.20	Q
13	4	4	Yuliia Krutoholova	Ukraine	2:01.26	Q
14	7	5	Anastasia Guzhenkova	Russia	2:01.29	Q
15	6	2	Gemma Cooney	Australia	2:01.86	Q
16	5	2	Linda Caponi	Italy	2:02.00	QSO
16	7	1	Carina Doyle	New Zealand	2:02.00	QSO
18	4	3	Noémi Girardet	Switzerland	2:02.04	
19	5	8	Tsuzumi Hasegawa	Japan	2:02.26	
20	5	1	Georgia Marris	New Zealand	2:02.55	
21	6	1	Choi Jung-min	South Korea	2:02.67	
22	3	2	Réka György	Hungary	2:03.34	
23	5	7	Erica Musso	Italy	2:03.61	
24	6	8	Abbey Harkin	Australia	2:04.14	
25	4	6	Marieke Tienstra	Netherlands	2:04.17	
26	3	6	Rita Frischknecht	Portugal	2:04.40	
27	7	8	Choi Hae-min	South Korea	2:04.49	
28	4	1	Jessica Cattaneo	Peru	2:05.00	
29	4	2	Kalina Gralewska	Poland	2:05.13	
30	3	5	Shahar Menahem	Israel	2:05.28	
31	4	8	Chang Fang-yu	Chinese Taipei	2:05.90	
32	3	4	Lee Yen-ni	Chinese Taipei	2:06.08	
33	2	5	Zhu Jingwen	China	2:06.30	
34	3	3	Tanja Kylliäinen	Finland	2:07.18	
35	4	7	Martina Elhenická	Czech Republic	2:07.21	
36	3	7	Patricia Aschan	Finland	2:07.45	
37	3	8	Maria Muñoz	Colombia	2:07.86	
38	2	4	Florencia Panzini	Argentina	2:08.45	
39	4	5	Joanna Cieślak	Poland	2:08.60	
40	2	7	Xu Rui	China	2:09.37	
41	2	6	Fiamma Peroni	Argentina	2:09.82	
42	2	2	Karol Camayo Agredo	Colombia	2:12.28	
43	2	8	Sara Moualfi	Algeria	2:14.32	
44	2	3	Kathriana Gustianjani	Indonesia	2:14.55	
45	1	4	Stefania Piccardo	Paraguay	2:17.21	
46	1	5	Carmenrose Matabuena	Philippines	2:19.55	
47	1	6	Julia Snurova	Estonia	2:39.45	
48	1	3	Joyce Palete	Philippines	2:41.55	
	2	1	Chrystelle Doueihy	Lebanon	DNS	
	3	1	Tereza Závadová	Czech Republic	DNS	
	6	6	Lucy Hope	Great Britain	DNS	
	7	3	Evelyn Verrasztó	Hungary	DNS	

=== Swim-off ===
Rank	Lane	Name	Nationality	Time	Notes
1	4	Linda Caponi	Italy	2:02.43	Q
2	5	Carina Doyle	New Zealand	2:02.92	

=== Semifinals ===
The semifinals were held on 24 August at 19:13.

==== Semifinal 1 ====
Rank	Lane	Name	Nationality	Time	Notes
1	6	Siobhán Haughey	Hong Kong	1:58.71	Q
2	1	Anastasia Guzhenkova	Russia	1:58.87	Q
3	4	Claire Rasmus	United States	1:59.47	Q
4	2	Arina Openysheva	Russia	1:59.53	Q
5	5	Chihiro Igarashi	Japan	1:59.81	
6	3	Kennedy Goss	Canada	1:59.94	
7	7	Larissa Oliveira	Brazil	2:00.24	
8	8	Linda Caponi	Italy	2:03.44	

==== Semifinal 2 ====
Rank	Lane	Name	Nationality	Time	Notes
1	2	Manuella Lyrio	Brazil	1:59.08	Q
2	4	Katie Drabot	United States	1:59.11	Q
3	5	Joanna Evans	Bahamas	1:59.19	Q, NR
4	3	Katerine Savard	Canada	1:59.44	Q
5	7	Alizée Morel	France	2:00.07	
6	8	Gemma Cooney	Australia	2:00.72	
7	6	Kathryn Greenslade	Great Britain	2:01.11	
8	1	Yuliia Krutoholova	Ukraine	2:01.51	

=== Final ===
The final was held on 25 August at 19:24.

Rank	Lane	Name	Nationality	Time	Notes
1st place, gold medalist(s)	4	Siobhán Haughey	Hong Kong	1:56.71	UR
2nd place, silver medalist(s)	6	Katie Drabot	United States	1:57.61	
3rd place, bronze medalist(s)	8	Arina Openysheva	Russia	1:58.53	
4	3	Manuella Lyrio	Brazil	1:58.64	
5	1	Claire Rasmus	United States	1:58.74	
6	7	Katerine Savard	Canada	1:59.21	
7	5	Anastasia Guzhenkova	Russia	1:59.44	
8	2	Joanna Evans	Bahamas	2:00.70	
