= Swimming at the 2017 Summer Universiade – Men's 200 metre butterfly =

Men's 200 metre butterfly at the 2017 Summer Universiade
- Venue: National Taiwan Sport University Arena
- Location: Taipei, Taiwan
- Dates: 22 August (heats and semifinals); 23 August (final)
- Competitors: 39 from 29 nations
- Winning time: 1:53.90

Medalists
gold medal	Nao Horomura	Japan
silver medal	Daiya Seto	Japan
bronze medal	Bence Biczó	Hungary

The Men's 200 metre butterfly competition at the 2017 Summer Universiade was held on 22 and 23 August 2017.

== Records ==
Prior to the competition, the existing world and Universiade records were as follows.

World record	Michael Phelps (USA)	1:51.51	Rome, Italy	29 July 2009
Competition record	Paweł Korzeniowski (POL)	1:54.30	Belgrade, Serbia	8 July 2009

The following new records were set during this competition.

Date	Event	Name	Nationality	Time	Record
23 August	Final	Nao Horomura	Japan	1:53.90	UR

== Results ==
=== Heats ===
The heats were held on 22 August at 09:00.

Rank	Heat	Lane	Name	Nationality	Time	Notes
1	4	5	Bence Biczó	Hungary	1:57.53	Q
2	5	6	Aleksandr Kudashev	Russia	1:57.91	Q
3	5	3	Zach Harting	United States	1:57.92	Q
4	4	4	Nao Horomura	Japan	1:58.02	Q
5	6	4	Daiya Seto	Japan	1:58.08	Q
6	5	5	Justin Wright	United States	1:58.75	Q
7	4	3	Alexander Kunert	Germany	1:58.91	Q
8	5	4	Leonardo de Deus	Brazil	1:58.94	Q
9	4	6	Fynn Minuth	Germany	1:59.25	Q
10	6	8	Lee Tae-gu	South Korea	1:59.27	Q
11	6	7	Brendan Hyland	Ireland	1:59.37	Q
12	5	2	Michał Poprawa	Poland	1:59.40	Q, WD
13	6	5	Giacomo Carini	Italy	1:59.49	Q
14	5	7	Vinicius Lanza	Brazil	1:59.71	Q
15	6	6	Aleksandr Pribytok	Russia	2:00.16	Q
16	6	1	Nicholas Brown	Australia	2:00.39	Q
17	6	3	Stefanos Dimitriadis	Greece	2:00.47	Q
18	4	8	Ramiro Ramirez Juarez	Mexico	2:00.56	
19	6	2	Cameron Brodie	Great Britain	2:00.71	
20	4	7	Tomáš Havránek	Czech Republic	2:00.74	
21	3	2	Nicolás Deferrari	Argentina	2:01.27	
22	5	1	Jesper Björk	Sweden	2:01.78	
23	3	3	Tsai Yi-lin	Chinese Taipei	2:03.07	
23	4	2	Paul Lemaire	France	2:03.07	
25	3	6	Héctor Ruvalcaba	Mexico	2:03.09	
26	4	1	Michael Gunning	Jamaica	2:03.43	
27	3	5	Chou Wei-liang	Chinese Taipei	2:03.49	
28	5	8	David Arias	Colombia	2:03.66	
29	2	3	Joshua Gold	Estonia	2:04.10	
30	3	7	Alard Basson	South Africa	2:04.75	
31	3	1	Adityastha Rai Wratsangka	Indonesia	2:05.06	
32	3	8	Muhammad Hamgari	Indonesia	2:07.79	
33	2	5	Ho Tin Long	Hong Kong	2:08.27	
34	2	6	Eetu Piiroinen	Finland	2:08.57	
35	2	2	Mu Xingxu	China	2:08.66	
36	2	4	Ng Chun Nam Derick	Hong Kong	2:10.54	
37	2	7	Sherif Assi	Lebanon	2:14.47	
38	1	4	Sander Paavo	Estonia	2:14.69	
39	1	5	Lee Zheng Kai	Singapore	2:19.45	
	1	3	Conrado Sacco Llano	Paraguay	DNS	
	3	4	Myles Brown	South Africa	DNS	

=== Semifinals ===
The semifinals were held on 22 August at 20:02.

==== Semifinal 1 ====
Rank	Lane	Name	Nationality	Time	Notes
1	5	Nao Horomura	Japan	1:56.61	Q
2	1	Aleksandr Pribytok	Russia	1:56.73	Q
3	6	Leonardo de Deus	Brazil	1:57.10	Q
4	3	Justin Wright	United States	1:57.27	Q
5	4	Aleksandr Kudashev	Russia	1:57.37	Q
6	7	Giacomo Carini	Italy	1:58.00	Q
7	8	Stefanos Dimitriadis	Greece	1:58.55	
8	2	Lee Tae-gu	South Korea	2:00.60	

==== Semifinal 2 ====
Rank	Lane	Name	Nationality	Time	Notes
1	3	Daiya Seto	Japan	1:56.14	Q
2	4	Bence Biczó	Hungary	1:56.32	Q
3	5	Zach Harting	United States	1:58.04	
4	6	Alexander Kunert	Germany	1:58.11	
5	2	Fynn Minuth	Germany	1:58.21	
6	7	Brendan Hyland	Ireland	1:59.26	
7	1	Vinicius Lanza	Brazil	2:00.08	
8	8	Nicholas Brown	Australia	2:01.19	

=== Final ===
The final was held on 23 August at 20:13.

Rank	Lane	Name	Nationality	Time	Notes
1st place, gold medalist(s)	3	Nao Horomura	Japan	1:53.90	UR
2nd place, silver medalist(s)	4	Daiya Seto	Japan	1:55.09	
3rd place, bronze medalist(s)	5	Bence Biczó	Hungary	1:56.16	
4	2	Leonardo de Deus	Brazil	1:56.29	
5	1	Aleksandr Kudashev	Russia	1:56.48	
6	7	Justin Wright	United States	1:57.06	
7	6	Aleksandr Pribytok	Russia	1:57.15	
8	8	Giacomo Carini	Italy	1:58.32	
