= Swimming at the 2017 Summer Universiade – Women's 50 metre freestyle =

Women's 50 metre freestyle at the 2017 Summer Universiade
- Venue: National Taiwan Sport University Arena
- Location: Taipei, Taiwan
- Dates: 25 August (heats and semifinals); 26 August (final)
- Competitors: 55 from 34 nations
- Winning time: 25.02

Medalists
gold medal	Caroline Baldwin	United States
silver medal	Maria Kameneva	Russia
bronze medal	Katrina Konopka	United States

The Women's 50 metre freestyle competition at the 2017 Summer Universiade was held on 25 and 26 August 2017.

== Records ==
Prior to the competition, the existing world and Universiade records were as follows.

World record	Sarah Sjöström (SWE)	23.67	Budapest, Hungary	29 July 2017
Competition record	Aliaksandra Herasimenia (BLR)	24.48	Kazan, Russia	16 July 2013

== Results ==
=== Heats ===
The heats were held on 25 August at 9:50.

Rank	Heat	Lane	Name	Nationality	Time	Notes
1	8	6	Maria Kameneva	Russia	24.99	Q
2	8	5	Katrina Konopka	United States	25.17	Q
3	6	4	Caroline Baldwin	United States	25.36	Q
4	7	5	Alessandra Marchioro	Brazil	25.38	Q
5	6	2	Kaho Okano	Japan	25.41	Q
6	7	3	Lucrezia Raco	Italy	25.42	Q
7	8	4	Anna Hopkin	Great Britain	25.52	Q
8	7	7	Emma Chelius	South Africa	25.61	Q
9	8	3	Chihiro Igarashi	Japan	25.64	Q
10	5	5	Anna Dowgiert	Poland	25.66	Q
11	7	4	Graciele Herrmann	Brazil	25.67	Q
12	7	8	Kira Toussaint	Netherlands	25.72	Q
13	6	6	Nastassia Karakouskaya	Belarus	25.73	Q
14	4	1	Aglaia Pezzato	Italy	25.88	Q
15	7	2	Choi Hae-min	South Korea	26.01	Q
16	6	7	Hwang Seo-jin	South Korea	26.10	Q
17	8	2	Jacqueline Keire	Canada	26.13	
17	8	7	Gemma Cooney	Australia	26.13	
19	7	6	Mariya Baklakova	Russia	26.26	
20	6	3	Lucy Hope	Great Britain	26.30	
21	8	1	Tessa Vermeulen	Netherlands	26.46	
22	7	1	Wu Tong	China	26.61	
23	6	1	Abbey Harkin	Australia	26.63	
24	8	8	Elmira Ibraim	Kazakhstan	26.66	
25	5	3	Huang Mei-chien	Chinese Taipei	26.85	
26	4	6	Nea Norismaa	Finland	26.88	
27	4	4	Carina Doyle	New Zealand	26.89	
28	5	8	Martina Elhenická	Czech Republic	26.90	
29	4	2	Tam Hoi Lam	Hong Kong	26.91	
29	5	7	Noémi Girarde	Switzerland	26.91	
31	5	6	Yu Wai Ting	Hong Kong	26.99	
32	5	2	María Díaz	Argentina	27.06	
33	6	8	Amira Pilgrim	Trinidad and Tobago	27.16	
34	3	8	Lei On Kei	Macau	27.18	
35	4	3	Mo Li-err	Chinese Taipei	27.25	
36	5	4	Joanna Cieślak	Poland	27.29	
37	3	1	Tan Chi Yan	Macau	27.34	
38	4	8	Zhu Xiaotong	China	27.53	
38	4	5	Maria Muñoz	Colombia	27.53	
40	3	6	Katriin Kersa	Estonia	27.85	
41	2	5	Deborah Ho	Singapore	28.00	
42	3	4	Jessica Cattaneo	Peru	28.16	
43	4	7	Florencia Panzini	Argentina	28.27	
44	3	5	Isabella Olivares	Philippines	28.29	
45	2	2	Yeo Xiu Wen	Singapore	28.38	
46	3	2	Karen Riveros	Paraguay	28.43	
47	3	3	María Giraldo	Colombia	28.58	
48	2	4	Carolina Cazot	Uruguay	28.59	
49	3	7	Stefania Piccardo	Paraguay	28.64	
50	2	7	Avice Meya	Uganda	29.23	
51	1	4	Liisa Lodi	Estonia	29.53	
52	2	1	Marianne Spuhr	Chile	29.76	
53	2	8	Erika Eslafor	Philippines	31.23	
54	1	5	Madhawee Kaluarachchilage	Sri Lanka	32.18	
55	1	3	Bawanthi Hettiarachchi	Sri Lanka	32.90	
	2	3	Doutimi Gaebe	Nigeria	DNS	
	2	6	Akina Kpiliboh	Nigeria	DNS	
	5	1	Fanny Teijonsalo	Finland	DNS	
	6	5	Sarah Fournier	Canada	DNS	

=== Semifinals ===
The semifinals were held on 25 August at 20:50.

==== Semifinal 1 ====
Rank	Lane	Name	Nationality	Time	Notes
1	4	Katrina Konopka	United States	25.24	Q
2	3	Lucrezia Raco	Italy	25.32	Q
3	5	Alessandra Marchioro	Brazil	25.36	Q
4	7	Kira Toussaint	Netherlands	25.62	
5	1	Aglaia Pezzato	Italy	25.65	
6	2	Anna Dowgiert	Poland	25.68	
7	6	Emma Chelius	South Africa	25.80	
8	8	Hwang Seo-jin	South Korea	25.91	

==== Semifinal 2 ====
Rank	Lane	Name	Nationality	Time	Notes
1	4	Maria Kameneva	Russia	24.82	Q, =NR
2	5	Caroline Baldwin	United States	25.15	Q
3	7	Graciele Herrmann	Brazil	25.18	Q
4	2	Chihiro Igarashi	Japan	25.38	Q
5	3	Kaho Okano	Japan	25.39	Q
6	6	Anna Hopkin	Great Britain	25.43	
7	1	Nastassia Karakouskaya	Belarus	25.61	
8	8	Choi Hae-min	South Korea	25.96	

=== Final ===
The final was held on 26 August at 19:02.

Rank	Lane	Name	Nationality	Time	Notes
1st place, gold medalist(s)	5	Caroline Baldwin	United States	25.02	
2nd place, silver medalist(s)	4	Maria Kameneva	Russia	25.08	
3rd place, bronze medalist(s)	6	Katrina Konopka	United States	25.21	
4	3	Graciele Herrmann	Brazil	25.26	
5	8	Kaho Okano	Japan	25.29	
6	2	Lucrezia Raco	Italy	25.30	
7	7	Alessandra Marchioro	Brazil	25.38	
8	1	Chihiro Igarashi	Japan	25.47	
