= Swimming at the 2017 Summer Universiade – Women's 400 metre freestyle =

Women's 400 metre freestyle at the 2017 Summer Universiade
- Venue: National Taiwan Sport University Arena
- Location: Taipei, Taiwan
- Dates: 26 August (heats and final)
- Competitors: 38 from 27 nations
- Winning time: 4:03.96

Medalists
gold medal	Sarah Köhler	Germany
silver medal	Joanna Evans	Bahamas
bronze medal	Sierra Schmidt	United States

The Women's 400 metre freestyle competition at the 2017 Summer Universiade was held on 26 August 2017.

== Records ==
Prior to the competition, the existing world and Universiade records were as follows.

World record	Katie Ledecky (USA)	3:56.46	Rio de Janeiro, Brazil	7 August 2016
Competition record	Leah Smith (USA)	4:04.66	Gwangju, South Korea	7 July 2015

The following new records were set during this competition.

Date	Event	Name	Nationality	Time	Record
26 August	Final	Sarah Köhler	Germany	4:03.96	UR

== Results ==
=== Heats ===
The heats were held at 09:00.

Rank	Heat	Lane	Name	Nationality	Time	Notes
1	5	4	Sarah Köhler	Germany	4:11.28	Q
2	5	5	Sierra Schmidt	United States	4:11.30	Q
3	5	6	Simona Quadarella	Italy	4:11.48	Q
4	5	6	Kaersten Meitz	United States	4:11.78	Q
5	4	5	Kiah Melverton	Australia	4:12.33	Q
6	4	4	Joanna Evans	Bahamas	4:12.52	Q
7	5	2	Kennedy Goss	Canada	4:13.08	Q
8	4	1	Julia Hassler	Liechtenstein	4:13.13	Q
9	4	2	Danica Ludlow	Canada	4:13.32	
10	4	3	Chihiro Igarashi	Japan	4:13.32	
11	4	7	Linda Caponi	Italy	4:14.67	
12	5	1	Camilla Hattersley	Great Britain	4:14.89	
13	4	8	Arina Openysheva	Russia	4:15.36	
14	4	6	Anna Egorova	Russia	4:15.49	
15	2	4	Yuliia Krutoholova	Ukraine	4:16.48	
16	5	7	Wakaba Tsuyuuchi	Japan	4:16.70	
17	5	8	Marion Abert	France	4:17.94	
18	3	5	Choi Jung-min	South Korea	4:19.70	
19	3	6	Maria Paula Heitmann	Brazil	4:20.61	
20	3	7	Milena Karpisz	Poland	4:21.14	
21	3	3	Carina Doyle	New Zealand	4:21.79	
22	2	5	Marieke Tienstra	Netherlands	4:22.41	
23	3	1	Martina Elhenická	Czech Republic	4:22.94	
24	3	8	Georgia Marris	New Zealand	4:23.06	
25	3	2	Tereza Závadová	Czech Republic	4:23.07	
26	3	4	Alizée Morel	France	4:23.37	
27	2	6	Chang Fang-yu	Chinese Taipei	4:23.38	
28	2	1	Zhu Jingwen	China	4:26.44	
29	2	2	Lee Yen-ni	Chinese Taipei	4:27.13	
30	1	3	Viktė Labanauskaitė	Lithuania	4:32.02	
31	1	6	Olivia Carrizo	Argentina	4:33.79	
32	1	4	Chrystelle Doueihy	Lebanon	4:40.18	
33	1	2	Sara Moualfi	Algeria	4:40.35	
34	2	3	Xu Rui	China	4:41.35	
35	1	5	Sasha-Lee Nordengen-Corris	South Africa	4:42.00	
36	2	8	Karol Camayo Agredo	Colombia	4:44.00	
37	2	7	Laura Abril Lizarazo	Colombia	4:44.02	
38	1	1	Joyce Palete	Philippines	5:46.42	
	1	7	Carmenrose Matabuena	Philippines	DNS	

=== Final ===
The final was held at 20:04.

Rank	Lane	Name	Nationality	Time	Notes
1st place, gold medalist(s)	4	Sarah Köhler	Germany	4:03.96	UR, NR
2nd place, silver medalist(s)	7	Joanna Evans	Bahamas	4:08.52	
3rd place, bronze medalist(s)	5	Sierra Schmidt	United States	4:09.82	
4	3	Simona Quadarella	Italy	4:10.49	
5	6	Kaersten Meitz	United States	4:10.84	
6	2	Kiah Melverton	Australia	4:12.42	
7	8	Julia Hassler	Liechtenstein	4:13.20	
8	1	Kennedy Goss	Canada	4:13.88	
