= List of Universiade records in swimming =

The fastest times swum in events at the Universiades (World University Games) are listed by International University Sports Federation (FISU) as a list of Universiade records in swimming. Swimming has been part of every Universiade, and the events are always held in a long course (50 m) pool. The last Universiade was held in Chengdu, China in 2023.

All records were set in finals unless noted otherwise.

== Men ==
Event	Time		Name	Nationality	Date	Meet	Location	Ref
50m freestyle	21.67		Vladimir Morozov	Russia	16 July 2013	2013 Universiade	Kazan, Russia	
100m freestyle	47.62		Vladimir Morozov	Russia	14 July 2013	2013 Universiade	Kazan, Russia	
200m freestyle	1:44.87	r	Danila Izotov	Russia	15 July 2013	2013 Universiade	Kazan, Russia	
400m freestyle	3:45.96		Mykhailo Romanchuk	Ukraine	20 August 2017	2017 Universiade	Taipei, Taiwan	
800m freestyle	7:45.76		Gregorio Paltrinieri	Italy	24 August 2017	2017 Universiade	Taipei, Taiwan	
1500m freestyle	14:47.75		Gregorio Paltrinieri	Italy	22 August 2017	2017 Universiade	Taipei, Taiwan	
50m backstroke	24.46	sf	Zane Waddell	South Africa	6 July 2019	2019 Universiade	Naples, Italy	
100m backstroke	51.99		Pieter Coetze	South Africa	19 July 2025	2025 World University Games	Berlin, Germany	
200m backstroke	1:54.13		Ryosuke Irie	Japan	10 July 2009	2009 Universiade	Belgrade, Serbia	
50m breaststroke	26.38	sf	Qin Haiyang	China	5 August 2023	2021 World University Games	Chengdu, China	
100m breaststroke	58.42	sf	Qin Haiyang	China	1 August 2023	2021 World University Games	Chengdu, China	
200m breaststroke	2:08.09		Qin Haiyang	China	4 August 2023	2021 World University Games	Chengdu, China	
50m butterfly	22.90		Andriy Govorov	Ukraine	21 August 2017	2017 Universiade	Taipei, Taiwan	
100m butterfly	50.85	sf	Jason Dunford	Kenya	9 July 2009	2009 Universiade	Belgrade, Serbia	
200m butterfly	1:53.90		Nao Horomura	Japan	23 August 2017	2017 Universiade	Taipei, Taiwan	
200m individual medley	1:57.24		Takumi Mori	Japan	19 July 2025	2025 World University Games	Berlin, Germany	
400m individual medley	4:11.98		Daiya Seto	Japan	26 August 2017	2017 Universiade	Taipei, Taiwan	
4 × 100 m freestyle relay	3:10.88		Andrey Grechin (47.98); Nikita Lobintsev (47.92); Vladimir Morozov (47.14); Danila Izotov (47.84)	Russia	10 July 2013	2013 Universiade	Kazan, Russia	
4 × 200 m freestyle relay	7:04.51		Mitchell Schott (1:46.06); Baylor Nelson (1:46.52); Jack Dahlgren (1:45.14); Jake Mitchell (1:46.79)	United States	22 July 2025	2025 World University Games	Berlin, Germany	
4 × 100 m medley relay	3:32.58		Wang Gukailai (54.76); Qin Haiyang (57.65); Chen Juner (51.37); Lin Tao (48.80)	China	7 August 2023	2021 World University Games	Chengdu, China	

Legend: # – Record awaiting ratification by FISU; WR – World record;
Records not set in finals: h – heat; sf – semifinal; r – relay 1st leg; rh – relay heat 1st leg; so – swim-off

== Women ==
Event	Time		Name	Nationality	Date	Meet	Location	Ref
50 m freestyle	24.29		Zhang Yufei	China	7 August 2023	2021 World University Games	Chengdu, China	
100 m freestyle	53.34		Zhang Yufei	China	3 August 2023	2021 World University Games	Chengdu, China	
200 m freestyle	1:56.71		Siobhan Haughey	Hong Kong	25 August 2017	2017 Summer Universiade	Taipei, Chinese Taipei	
400 m freestyle	4:03.96		Sarah Köhler	Germany	26 August 2017	2017 Summer Universiade	Taipei, Chinese Taipei	
800 m freestyle	8:20.54		Simona Quadarella	Italy	25 August 2017	2017 Summer Universiade	Taipei, Chinese Taipei	
1500 m freestyle	15:57.90		Simona Quadarella	Italy	23 August 2017	2017 Summer Universiade	Taipei, Chinese Taipei	
50 m backstroke	27.31		Leah Shackley	United States	22 July 2025	2025 World University Games	Berlin, Germany	
100 m backstroke	58.78		Kennedy Noble	United States	20 July 2025	2025 World University Games	Berlin, Germany	
200 m backstroke	2:05.99		Leah Shackley	United States	17 July 2025	2025 World University Games	Berlin, Germany	
50 m breaststroke	30.12		Yuliya Yefimova	Russia	16 July 2013	2013 Summer Universiade	Kazan, Russia	
100 m breaststroke	1:05.48		Yuliya Yefimova	Russia	12 July 2013	2013 Summer Universiade	Kazan, Russia	
200 m breaststroke	2:22.32		Rie Kaneto	Japan	9 July 2009	2009 Summer Universiade	Belgrade, Serbia	
50m butterfly	25.20		Zhang Yufei	China	2 August 2023	2021 World University Games	Chengdu, China	
100m butterfly	56.57		Zhang Yufei	China	5 August 2023	2021 World University Games	Chengdu, China	
200m butterfly	2:05.20	sf	Tess Howley	United States	22 July 2025	2025 World University Games	Berlin, Germany	
200m individual medley	2:09.48		Leah Hayes	United States	22 July 2025	2025 World University Games	Berlin, Germany	
400m individual medley	4:34.40		Yui Ohashi	Japan	20 August 2017	2017 Summer Universiade	Taipei, Chinese Taipei	
4 × 100 m freestyle relay	3:36.21		Maxine Parker (54.28); Caroline Larsen (54.16); Julia Dennis (54.01); Isabel Ivey (53.76)	United States	17 July 2025	2025 World University Games	Berlin, Germany	
4 × 200 m freestyle relay	7:52.56		Leah Hayes (1:57.87); Cavan Gormsen (1:58.05); Lindsay Looney (1:59.41); Isabel Ivey (1:57.23)	United States	20 July 2025	2025 World University Games	Berlin, Germany	
4 × 100 m medley relay	3:58.04		Anastasia Zuyeva (59.88); Yuliya Yefimova (1:05.51); Veronika Popova (58.29); Viktoriya Andreyeva (54.36)	Russia	16 July 2013	2013 Summer Universiade	Kazan, Russia	

Legend: # – Record awaiting ratification by FISU; WR – World record;
Records not set in finals: h – heat; sf – semifinal; r – relay 1st leg; rh – relay heat 1st leg; so – swim-off

== Mixed relay ==
Event	Time	Name	Nationality	Date	Meet	Location	Ref
4×100 m freestyle relay	3:24.27	Matt King (48.28); David King (48.35); Isabel Ivey (54.13); Maxine Parker (53.51)	United States	21 July 2025	2025 World University Games	Berlin, Germany	
4×100 m medley relay	3:44.02	Wang Gukailai (54.83); Qin Haiyang (58.64); Zhang Yufei (56.81); Li Bingjie (53.74)	China	2 August 2023	2021 World University Games	Chengdu, China	

Legend: # – Record awaiting ratification by FISU; WR – World record;
Records not set in finals: h – heat; so – swim-off

== See also ==
- List of Universiade records in athletics
