= Swimming at the 2018 Asian Games – Men's 200 metre butterfly =

Men's 200 metre butterfly at the 2018 Asian Games
- Venue: Gelora Bung Karno Aquatic Stadium
- Date: 19 August 2018
- Competitors: 19 from 13 nations

Medalists
gold medal	Daiya Seto	Japan
silver medal	Nao Horomura	Japan
bronze medal	Li Zhuhao	China

The men's 200-metre butterfly event at the 2018 Asian Games took place on 19 August at the Gelora Bung Karno Aquatic Stadium.

== Schedule ==
All times are Western Indonesia Time (UTC+07:00)

Date	Time	Event
Sunday, 19 August 2018	10:17	Heats
Sunday, 19 August 2018	19:27	Final

== Records ==
Prior to this competition, the existing world, Asian and Games records were as follows.

World Record	Michael Phelps (USA)	1:51.51	Rome, Italy	29 July 2009
Asian Record	Takeshi Matsuda (JPN)	1:52.97	Beijing, China	13 August 2008
Games Record	Takeshi Matsuda (JPN)	1:54.02	Guangzhou, China	13 November 2010

== Results ==
=== Heats ===
Rank	Heat	Athlete	Time	Notes
1	2	Daiya Seto (JPN)	1:57.23	
2	3	Nao Horomura (JPN)	1:58.06	
3	3	Sajan Prakash (IND)	1:58.12	
4	1	Li Zhuhao (CHN)	1:58.21	
5	2	Wang Zhou (CHN)	1:58.71	
6	3	Wang Kuan-hung (TPE)	1:58.73	
7	3	Quah Zheng Wen (SGP)	1:59.17	
8	1	Park Jung-hun (KOR)	2:00.57	
9	1	Chang Gyu-cheol (KOR)	2:01.85	
10	1	Nicholas Lim (HKG)	2:02.70	
11	3	Navaphat Wongcharoen (THA)	2:02.93	
12	2	Ong Jung Yi (SGP)	2:03.28	
13	3	Ho Tin Long (HKG)	2:05.17	
14	2	Cherantha de Silva (SRI)	2:05.90	
15	2	Artyom Kozlyuk (UZB)	2:08.93	
16	1	Lin Sizhuang (MAC)	2:11.16	
17	3	Abdulrahman Al-Kulaibi (OMA)	2:16.06	
18	1	Batmönkhiin Jürmed (MGL)	2:29.50	
19	2	Buman-Uchralyn Bat-Od (MGL)	2:38.27	

=== Final ===
Rank	Athlete	Time	Notes
1st place, gold medalist(s)	Daiya Seto (JPN)	1:54.53	
2nd place, silver medalist(s)	Nao Horomura (JPN)	1:55.58	
3rd place, bronze medalist(s)	Li Zhuhao (CHN)	1:55.76	
4	Wang Zhou (CHN)	1:56.75	
5	Sajan Prakash (IND)	1:57.75	
6	Quah Zheng Wen (SGP)	1:57.95	
7	Wang Kuan-hung (TPE)	1:58.63	
8	Park Jung-hun (KOR)	1:58.67	
