= Tamires Crude =

Brazilian judoka (born 1994)

Personal information
- Nationality: Brazilian
- Born: 12 January 1994 (age 32)
- Occupation: Judoka

Sport
- Country: Brazil
- Sport: Judo
- Weight class: –57 kg, –63 kg

Achievements and titles
- Pan American Champ.: (2018)
Medal record
Women's judo
Representing Brazil
World Championships
Bronze medal – third place	2019 Tokyo	Mixed team
Pan American Championships
Silver medal – second place	2018 San José	–57 kg
IJF Grand Slam
Bronze medal – third place	2022 Tbilisi	–63 kg
IJF Grand Prix
Bronze medal – third place	2013 Qingdao	–57 kg
Summer Universiade
Bronze medal – third place	2017 Taipei	–57 kg

Profile at external databases
- IJF: 14663
- JudoInside.com: 87607
- Updated on 5 June 2022

Tamires Crude (born 12 January 1994) is a Brazilian judoka.

She won a medal at the 2019 World Judo Championships.
