= Giovanna Oliveira =

Giovanna Oliveira may refer to:

- Giovanna Oliveira (footballer)
- Giovanna Oliveira (gymnast)
