= Matheus Rezende =

Brazilian footballer

Personal information
- Full name: Matheus Rezende Assis
- Date of birth: 17 March 1995 (age 31)
- Place of birth: São Luís de Montes Belos, Brazil
- Height: 1.78 m (5 ft 10 in)
- Position: Midfielder

Team information
- Current team: Anápolis

Senior career*
Years	Team	Apps	(Gls)
2016–2019	Goiás	7	(2)
2019	→ Boa Esporte (loan)	2	(0)
2020–	Anápolis	4	(0)

International career
2017	Brazil (University)	6	(0)
- * Club domestic league appearances and goals as of 14:42, 19 July 2019 (UTC)

Matheus Rezende Assis (born 17 March 1995) is a Brazilian footballer who currently plays as a midfielder for Anápolis.

== Career statistics ==
=== Club ===
As of 19 July 2019.

Club	Season	League			State League		Cup		Continental		Other		Total	
Club	Season	Division	Apps	Goals	Apps	Goals	Apps	Goals	Apps	Goals	Apps	Goals	Apps	Goals
Goiás	2016	Série B	1	1	0	0	0	0	–		0	0	1	1
Goiás	2017	Série B	1	1	2 (Note: Appearances in the Campeonato Goiano)	0	0	0	–		0	0	3	1
Goiás	2018	Série B	0	0	3	0	0	0	–		0	0	3	0
Goiás	2019	Série A	0	0	0	0	0	0	–		0	0	0	0
Goiás	Total		2	2	5	0	0	0	0	0	0	0	7	2
Boa Esporte (loan)	2019	Série C	0	0	2 (Note: Appearances in the Campeonato Mineiro)	0	0	0	–		0	0	2	0
Career total			2	2	7	0	0	0	0	0	0	0	9	2
