= Marcus Schlesinger =

Israeli swimmer

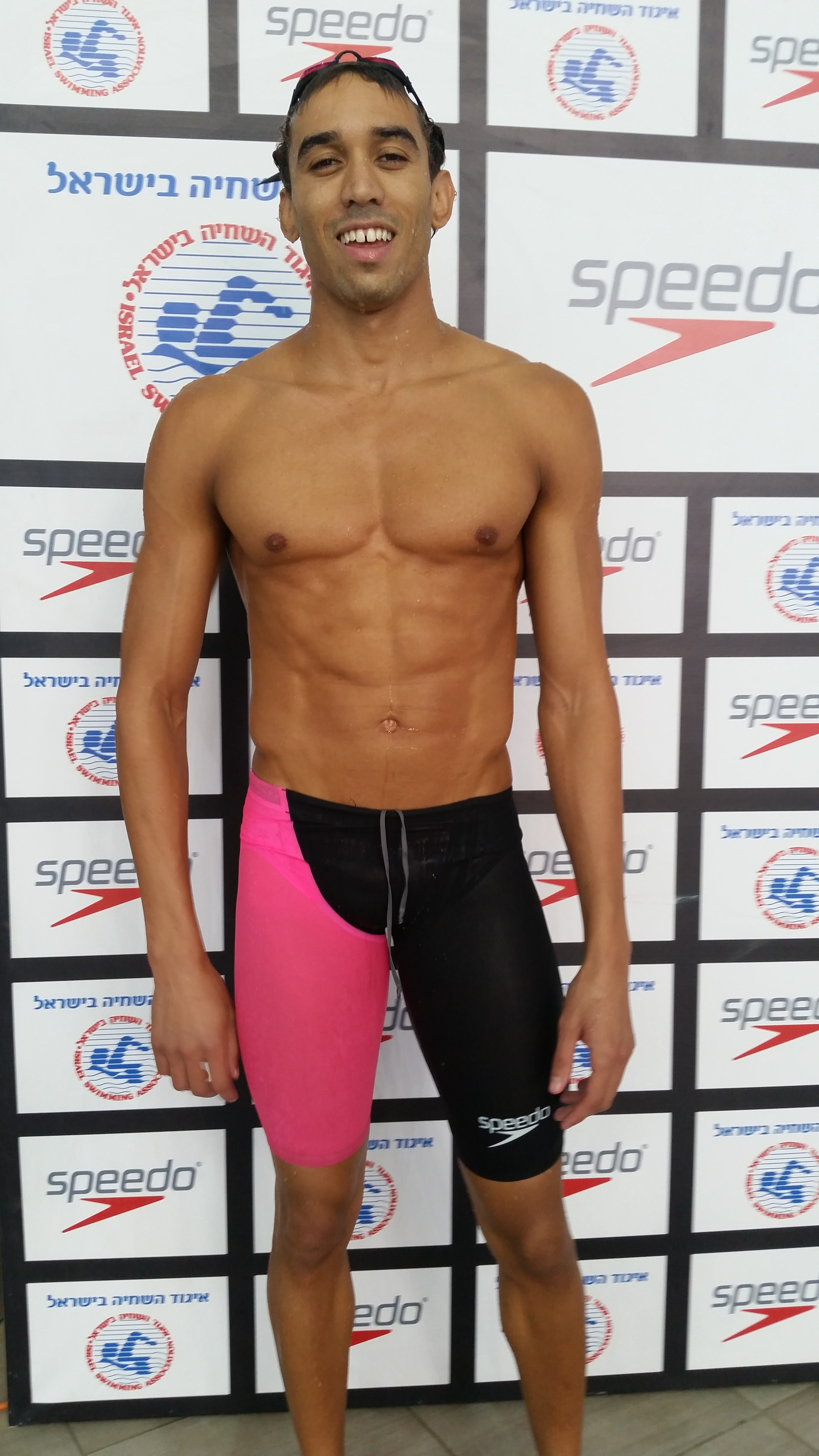

Personal information
- Native name: מרקוס שלזינגר
- Nationality: Israeli
- Born: 16 November 1991 (age 34)

Sport
- Sport: Swimming

Marcus John Schlesinger (Hebrew: מרקוס ג'ון שלזינגר; born 16 November 1991) is an Israeli swimmer. He competed in the men's 50 metre butterfly event at the 2017 World Aquatics Championships.

== See also ==
- List of Israeli records in swimming
