= Justin Lynch =

American swimmer (born 1996)

Personal information
- Nicknames: D'Justin, J$, Trolling Motor
- National team: United States
- Born: August 27, 1996 (age 29) Vallejo, California, U.S.
- Height: 6 ft 1 in (185.4 cm)

Sport
- Sport: Swimming
- Strokes: Butterfly, freestyle
- College team: University of California, Berkeley
- Coach: Dave Durden
Medal record
Men's swimming
Representing the United States
World Junior Championships
Bronze medal – third place	2013 Dubai	100 m butterfly
World University Games
Gold medal – first place	2017 Taipei	4×100 m freestyle
Gold medal – first place	2017 Taipei	4×100 m medley

Justin Lynch (born August 27, 1996) is an American former swimmer.

As a high schooler, Lynch bested national age-group records set by world and Olympic champion Michael Phelps.

Justin Lynch was born in Vallejo, California. He swam at University of California, Berkeley from 2014 to 2018. Lynch is an alumnus of Visions in Education, a tuition-free public charter school.
