= Yahor Dodaleu =

Belarusian swimmer

Personal information
- Born: 1 February 1993 (age 33)

Sport
- Sport: Swimming

Yahor Dodaleu (born 1 February 1993) is a Belarusian swimmer. He competed in the men's 50 metre butterfly event at the 2017 World Aquatics Championships.
