= Aleksandr Kudashev =

Russian swimmer

Personal information
- Nationality: Russia
- Born: 5 December 1995 (age 30) Samara, Russia

Sport
- Sport: Swimming
Medal record
European Championships (LC)
Silver medal – second place	2020 Budapest	4×100 m medley
Summer Universiade
Gold medal – first place	2019 Naples	200 m butterfly
Silver medal – second place	2017 Taipei	4×100 m medley
Bronze medal – third place	2017 Taipei	4×200 m freestyle

Aleksandr Kudashev (born 5 December 1995) is a Russian swimmer. He competed in the 2020 Summer Olympics. He was provisionally suspended by FINA for doping but was reinstated by CAS in time for his participation in the Games.
