= Volleyball at the 2017 Summer Universiade – Men's tournament =

The 2017 Men's Summer Universiade Volleyball Tournament was the 29th edition of the event, organized by the Summer Universiade. It was held in Taipei, Taiwan from 20 to 29 August 2017.

== Pool standing procedure ==
1. Match points
2. Number of matches won
3. Sets ratio
4. Points ratio
5. Result of the last match between the tied teams

Match won 3–0 or 3–1: 3 match points for the winner, 0 match points for the loser
Match won 3–2: 2 match points for the winner, 1 match point for the loser

== Preliminary round ==
- All times are Taiwan Standard Time (UTC+08:00)

=== Pool A ===
Pos	Team	Pld	W	L	Pts	SW	SL	SR	SPW	SPL	SPR	Qualification
1	Japan	4	3	1	9	11	7	1.571	421	374	1.126	Quarterfinals
2	Brazil	4	3	1	7	9	7	1.286	374	376	0.995	Quarterfinals
3	France	4	2	2	7	9	7	1.286	374	358	1.045	9th–16th place
4	Chinese Taipei	4	2	2	5	8	8	1.000	356	360	0.989	9th–16th place
5	United States	4	0	4	2	4	12	0.333	321	378	0.849	17th–22nd place

Date	Time		Score		Set 1	Set 2	Set 3	Set 4	Set 5	Total	Report
20 Aug	18:00	Japan	3–2	United States	23–25	23–25	25–19	25–18	15–9	111–96	P2 P3
20 Aug	20:00	Chinese Taipei	1–3	France	19–25	27–25	23–25	20–25		89–100	P2 P3
21 Aug	18:00	Brazil	3–2	Japan	32–34	26–24	25–22	18–25	15–13	116–118	P2 P3
21 Aug	20:00	United States	2–3	Chinese Taipei	28–26	18–25	23–25	25–21	12–15	106–112	P2 P3
22 Aug	18:00	France	3–0	United States	25–18	25–18	25–17			75–53	P2 P3
22 Aug	20:00	Chinese Taipei	3–0	Brazil	25–20	25–17	25–21			75–58	P2 P3
24 Aug	18:00	Brazil	3–2	France	21–25	21–25	26–24	25–18	27–25	120–117	P2 P3
24 Aug	20:00	Japan	3–1	Chinese Taipei	21–25	25–23	25–13	25–19		96–80	P2 P3
25 Aug	15:00	France	1–3	Japan	17–25	25–21	19–25	21–25		82–96	P2 P3
25 Aug	18:00	United States	0–3	Brazil	19–25	28–30	19–25			66–80	P2 P3

=== Pool B ===
Pos	Team	Pld	W	L	Pts	SW	SL	SR	SPW	SPL	SPR	Qualification
1	Ukraine	4	4	0	11	12	2	6.000	335	285	1.175	Quarterfinals
2	Portugal	4	3	1	8	9	6	1.500	342	333	1.027	Quarterfinals
3	South Korea	4	2	2	8	10	8	1.250	418	383	1.091	9th–16th place
4	Mexico	4	1	3	3	4	9	0.444	295	324	0.910	9th–16th place
5	Latvia	4	0	4	0	2	12	0.167	282	347	0.813	17th–22nd place

Date	Time		Score		Set 1	Set 2	Set 3	Set 4	Set 5	Total	Report
20 Aug	13:00	Mexico	0–3	Ukraine	20–25	22–25	24–26			66–76	P2 P3
20 Aug	15:00	Portugal	3–2	South Korea	21–25	25–19	25–23	19–25	15–12	105–104	P2 P3
21 Aug	13:00	Ukraine	3–0	Portugal	25–21	25–20	25–22			75–63	P2 P3
21 Aug	15:00	Latvia	0–3	Mexico	22–25	22–25	19–25			63–75	P2 P3
22 Aug	15:00	South Korea	2–3	Ukraine	25–22	25–22	20–25	23–25	13–15	106–109	P2 P3
22 Aug	20:00	Portugal	3–1	Latvia	22–25	25–23	27–25	25–22		99–95	P2 P3
24 Aug	15:00	Latvia	1–3	South Korea	18–25	25–23	17–25	14–25		74–98	P2 P3
24 Aug	18:00	Mexico	0–3	Portugal	23–25	15–25	21–25			59–75	P2 P3
25 Aug	20:00	South Korea	3–1	Mexico	25–20	23–25	37–35	25–15		110–95	P2P3
25 Aug	20:00	Ukraine	3–0	Latvia	25–12	25–18	25–20			75–50	P2 P3

=== Pool C ===
Pos	Team	Pld	W	L	Pts	SW	SL	SR	SPW	SPL	SPR	Qualification
1	Russia	5	5	0	15	15	1	15.000	411	335	1.227	Quarterfinals
2	Czech Republic	5	4	1	11	12	6	2.000	415	366	1.134	Quarterfinals
3	Romania	5	3	2	9	11	7	1.571	427	403	1.060	9th–16th place
4	Hong Kong	5	2	3	5	8	13	0.615	411	464	0.886	9th–16th place
5	Australia	5	1	4	4	6	13	0.462	420	429	0.979	17th–22nd place
6	Chile	5	0	5	1	3	15	0.200	335	422	0.794	17th–22nd place

Date	Time		Score		Set 1	Set 2	Set 3	Set 4	Set 5	Total	Report
20 Aug	13:00	Romania	3–0	Chile	25–23	25–18	25–9			75–50	P2 P3
20 Aug	15:00	Czech Republic	3–0	Australia	25–15	25–23	25–20			75–58	P2 P3
20 Aug	18:00	Russia	3–0	Hong Kong	25–20	25–17	25–14			75–51	P2 P3
21 Aug	13:00	Romania	1–3	Czech Republic	27–29	20–25	25–19	23–25		95–98	P2 P3
21 Aug	15:00	Australia	0–3	Russia	31–33	21–25	20–25			72–83	P2 P3
21 Aug	18:00	Chile	2–3	Hong Kong	16–25	23–25	25–18	25–21	12–15	101–104	P2 P3
22 Aug	13:00	Russia	3–1	Romania	26–24	25–15	23–25	25–19		99–83	P2 P3
22 Aug	15:00	Czech Republic	3–0	Chile	25–10	25–16	25–18			75–44	P2 P3
22 Aug	18:00	Hong Kong	3–2	Australia	18–25	16–25	25–23	25–22	15–13	99–108	P2 P3
24 Aug	15:00	Czech Republic	0–3	Russia	22–25	23–25	17–25			62–75	P2P3
24 Aug	15:00	Chile	1–3	Australia	8–25	25–14	21–25	19–25		73–89	P2 P3
24 Aug	18:00	Romania	3–0	Hong Kong	25–20	25–20	25–23			75–63	P2 P3
25 Aug	15:00	Russia	3–0	Chile	25–21	29–27	25–19			79–67	P2 P3
25 Aug	18:00	Hong Kong	2–3	Czech Republic	25–20	13–25	21–25	25–20	10–15	94–105	P2 P3
25 Aug	20:00	Australia	1–3	Romania	24–26	25–23	22–25	22–25		93–99	P2 P3

=== Pool D ===
Pos	Team	Pld	W	L	Pts	SW	SL	SR	SPW	SPL	SPR	Qualification
1	Iran	5	5	0	15	15	2	7.500	419	317	1.322	Quarterfinals
2	Argentina	5	4	1	12	13	3	4.333	381	305	1.249	Quarterfinals
3	Switzerland	5	3	2	8	10	9	1.111	447	407	1.098	9th–16th place
4	Canada	5	2	3	6	8	11	0.727	390	426	0.915	9th–16th place
5	Cyprus	5	1	4	3	3	13	0.231	297	394	0.754	17th–22nd place
6	United Arab Emirates	5	0	5	1	4	15	0.267	367	452	0.812	17th–22nd place

Date	Time		Score		Set 1	Set 2	Set 3	Set 4	Set 5	Total	Report
20 Aug	13:00	Cyprus	0–3	Iran	18–25	14–25	12–25			44–75	P2 P3
20 Aug	15:00	Argentina	3–0	Switzerland	25–23	25–19	28–26			78–68	P2 P3
20 Aug	18:00	Canada	3–2	United Arab Emirates	23–25	25–21	25–21	23–25	16–14	112–106	P2 P3
21 Aug	18:00	Cyprus	0–3	Argentina	16–25	23–25	10–25			49–75	P2 P3
21 Aug	18:00	Iran	3–0	United Arab Emirates	25–17	25–14	25–20			75–51	P2 P3
21 Aug	20:00	Switzerland	3–2	Canada	23–25	30–32	25–17	25–23	15–13	118–110	P2 P3
22 Aug	18:00	United Arab Emirates	1–3	Switzerland	14–25	14–25	25–17	12–25		65–92	P2 P3
22 Aug	18:00	Argentina	1–3	Iran	16–25	15–25	25–19	22–25		78–94	P2 P3
22 Aug	20:00	Canada	3–0	Cyprus	25–15	25–22	25–15			75–52	P2 P3
24 Aug	13:00	Argentina	3–0	Canada	25–11	25–17	25–15			75–43	P2 P2
24 Aug	15:00	Iran	3–1	Switzerland	29–27	25–19	21–25	25–23		100–94	P2 P3
24 Aug	18:00	Cyprus	3–1	United Arab Emirates	23–25	25–23	25–23	25–23		98–94	P2 P3
25 Aug	13:00	Canada	0–3	Iran	19–25	15–25	16–25			50–75	P2 P3
25 Aug	15:00	United Arab Emirates	0–3	Argentina	18–25	20–25	13–25			51–75	P2 P3
25 Aug	18:00	Switzerland	3–0	Cyprus	25–18	25–17	25–19			75–54	P2 P3

== Final round ==
=== 17th–22nd places ===
17th–22nd place quarterfinals
27 August 15:00
United Arab Emirates	0
Australia	3
27 August 18:00
Cyprus	3
Chile	1

17th–20th place semifinals
28 August 13:00
United States	3
Australia	1
28 August 15:00
Latvia	3
Cyprus	1

17th place match
29 August 15:00
United States	3
Latvia	0
19th place match
29 August 13:00
Australia	3
Cyprus	0

==== 17th–22nd place quarterfinals ====
Date	Time		Score		Set 1	Set 2	Set 3	Set 4	Set 5	Total	Report
27 Aug	15:00	United Arab Emirates	0–3	Australia	22–25	16–25	17–25			55–75	P2 P3
27 Aug	18:00	Cyprus	3–1	Chile	25–19	28–26	19–25	25–18		97–88	P2 P3

==== 17th–20th place semifinals ====
Date	Time		Score		Set 1	Set 2	Set 3	Set 4	Set 5	Total	Report
28 Aug	13:00	United States	3–1	Australia	15–25	25–20	25–21	29–27		94–93	P2 P3
28 Aug	15:00	Latvia	3–1	Cyprus	25–19	22–25	25–23	25–22		97–89	P2 P3

==== 21st place match ====
Date	Time		Score		Set 1	Set 2	Set 3	Set 4	Set 5	Total	Report
28 Aug	17:30	United Arab Emirates	1–3	Chile	23–25	27–25	14–25	20–25		84–100	P2 P3

==== 19th place match ====
Date	Time		Score		Set 1	Set 2	Set 3	Set 4	Set 5	Total	Report
29 Aug	13:00	Australia	3–0	Cyprus	28–26	25–19	25–16			78–61	P2 P3

==== 17th place match ====
Date	Time		Score		Set 1	Set 2	Set 3	Set 4	Set 5	Total	Report
29 Aug	15:00	United States	3–0	Latvia	25–20	25–23	25–23			75–66	P2 P3

=== 9th–16th places ===
13th place
Mexico	0
South Korea	3
15th place
Romania	3
Hong Kong	1

13th–16th place semifinals
Mexico	3
Romania	1
Hong Kong	0
South Korea	3

9th–16th place quarterfinals
France	3
Mexico	0
Canada	3
Romania	2
Switzerland	3
Hong Kong	1
Chinese Taipei	3
South Korea	0

9th–12th place semifinals
France	3
Canada	1
Switzerland	3
Chinese Taipei	1

9th place
France	3
Switzerland	0
11th place
Canada	3
Chinese Taipei	1

==== 9th–16th place quarterfinals ====
Date	Time		Score		Set 1	Set 2	Set 3	Set 4	Set 5	Total	Report
27 Aug	13:00	France	3–0	Mexico	25–23	25–13	25–21			75–57	P2 P3
27 Aug	15:00	Canada	3–2	Romania	20–25	25–16	18–25	26–24	15–13	104–103	P2 P3
27 Aug	18:00	Switzerland	3–1	Hong Kong	26–28	25–20	25–21	25–20		101–89	P2 P3
27 Aug	20:00	Chinese Taipei	3–0	South Korea	25–13	25–20	25–22			75–55	P2 P3

==== 13th–16th place semifinals ====
Date	Time		Score		Set 1	Set 2	Set 3	Set 4	Set 5	Total	Report
28 Aug	13:00	Mexico	3–1	Romania	25–21	18–25	25–19	27–25		95–90	P2 P3
28 Aug	15:00	Hong Kong	0–3	South Korea	18–25	24–26	25–27			67–78	P2 P3

==== 9th–12th place semifinals ====
Date	Time		Score		Set 1	Set 2	Set 3	Set 4	Set 5	Total	Report
28 Aug	17:30	France	3–1	Canada	21–25	25–23	25–16	25–22		96–86	P2 P3
28 Aug	20:00	Switzerland	3–1	Chinese Taipei	30–28	24–26	25–17	25–20		104–91	P2 P3

==== 15th place match ====
Date	Time		Score		Set 1	Set 2	Set 3	Set 4	Set 5	Total	Report
29 Aug	13:00	Romania	3–1	Hong Kong	25–22	17–25	25–23	25–17		92–87	P2 P3

==== 13th place match ====
Date	Time		Score		Set 1	Set 2	Set 3	Set 4	Set 5	Total	Report
29 Aug	15:00	Mexico	0–3	South Korea	22–25	20–25	22–25			64–75	P2 P3

==== 11th place match ====
Date	Time		Score		Set 1	Set 2	Set 3	Set 4	Set 5	Total	Report
29 Aug	13:00	Canada	3–1	Chinese Taipei	25–21	16–25	25–17	25–17		91–80	P2 P3

==== 9th place match ====
Date	Time		Score		Set 1	Set 2	Set 3	Set 4	Set 5	Total	Report
29 Aug	15:00	France	3–0	Switzerland	25–21	25–20	28–26			78–67	P2 P3

=== 1st–8th places ===
5th place
Argentina	1
Brazil	3
7th place
Portugal	1
Czech Republic	3

5th–8th place semifinals
Portugal	0
Argentina	3
Czech Republic	1
Brazil	3

Quarterfinals
Japan	3
Portugal	0
Argentina	2
Russia	3
Iran	3
Czech Republic	0
Brazil	1
Ukraine	3

Semifinals
Japan	0
Russia	3
Iran	3
Ukraine	0

Final
Russia	2
Iran	3
Third place
Japan	3
Ukraine	1

==== Quarterfinals ====
Date	Time		Score		Set 1	Set 2	Set 3	Set 4	Set 5	Total	Report
27 Aug	13:00	Iran	3–0	Czech Republic	25–14	25–23	25–20			75–57	P2 P3
27 Aug	15:00	Brazil	1–3	Ukraine	20–25	25–13	21–25	16–25		82–88	P2 P3
27 Aug	18:00	Argentina	2–3	Russia	25–22	25–17	23–25	18–25	11–15	102–104	P2 P3
27 Aug	20:00	Japan	3–0	Portugal	25–19	25–15	25–20			75–54	P2 P3

==== 5th–8th place semifinals ====
Date	Time		Score		Set 1	Set 2	Set 3	Set 4	Set 5	Total	Report
28 Aug	13:00	Czech Republic	1–3	Brazil	25–23	18–25	20–25	21–25		84–98	P2 P3
28 Aug	15:00	Portugal	0–3	Argentina	16–25	14–25	19–25			49–75	P2 P3

==== Semifinals ====
Date	Time		Score		Set 1	Set 2	Set 3	Set 4	Set 5	Total	Report
28 Aug	13:00	Iran	3–0	Ukraine	25–21	25–12	25–22			75–55	P2 P3
28 Aug	15:00	Japan	0–3	Russia	18–25	23–25	22–25			63–75	P2 P3

==== 7th place match ====
Date	Time		Score		Set 1	Set 2	Set 3	Set 4	Set 5	Total	Report
29 Aug	18:00	Portugal	1–3	Czech Republic	25–22	21–25	21–25	22–25		89–97	P2 P3

==== 5th place match ====
Date	Time		Score		Set 1	Set 2	Set 3	Set 4	Set 5	Total	Report
29 Aug	14:00	Argentina	1–3	Brazil	24–26	17–25	25–15	22–25		88–91	P2 P3

==== Third place match ====
Date	Time		Score		Set 1	Set 2	Set 3	Set 4	Set 5	Total	Report
29 Aug	17:00	Japan	3–1	Ukraine	25–22	21–25	25–22	25–21		96–90	P2 P3

==== Final ====
Date	Time		Score		Set 1	Set 2	Set 3	Set 4	Set 5	Total	Report
29 Aug	20:00	Russia	2–3	Iran	17–25	25–15	25–23	23–25	13–15	103–103	P2 P3

== Final standing ==
Rank	Team
1st place, gold medalist(s)	Iran
2nd place, silver medalist(s)	Russia
3rd place, bronze medalist(s)	Japan
4	Ukraine
5	Brazil
6	Argentina
7	Czech Republic
8	Portugal
9	France
10	Switzerland
11	Canada
12	Chinese Taipei
13	South Korea
14	Mexico
15	Romania
16	Hong Kong
17	United States
18	Latvia
19	Australia
20	Cyprus
21	Chile
22	United Arab Emirates

2017 Men's Universiade champions

Iran
1st title

12–man Roster
Valaei, Fallah, Mohammadfathali, Karkhaneh, Moazzen, Shiroodghorbani, Ranjbar, Heidari Shahi, Yousefpoor, Piroutpour, Vadi (c), Barshan
Head Coach: Masoud Armat

== Medalists ==
Gold	Silver	Bronze
Iran (IRI); Akbar Valaei; Mohammad Fallah; Amirali Mohammadfathali; Ghasem Karkhaneh; Mohammad Reza Moazzen; Saeid Shiroodghorbani; Armin Ranjbar; Behzad Heidari Shahi; Ali Yousefpoor; Farhad Piroutpour; Mohammad Taher Vadi (c); Hadi Barshan	Russia (RUS); Evgenii Bannov; Azizbek Ismailov; Vadim Likhosherstov; Bogdan Glivenko; Dmitrii Emelianov; Leonid Shchadilov; Anton Botin; Vladimir Shishkin; Dmitry Shcherbinin (c); Alexey Pluzhnikov; Alexander Boldyrev; Sergey Nikitin	Japan (JPN); Naoya Takano; Takahiko Imamura; Kenya Fujinaka; Taichi Fukuyama (c); Shohei Yamaguchi; Yasunari Kodama; Tomohiro Yamamoto; Tsubasa Hisahara; Kosuke Hata; Keisuke Sakai; Yutaka Ogihara; Yuma Watanabe
