= Bahamas at the 2017 Summer Universiade =

- IOC code: BAH
- NOC: Bahamas Olympic Committee

in Taipei, Taiwan 19 – 30 July 2017
- Competitors: 4 in 1 sport
- Medals Ranked 50th: Gold 0 Silver 1 Bronze 1 Total 2

Summer Universiade appearances
- 1959; 1961; 1963; 1965; 1967; 1970; 1973; 1975; 1977; 1979; 1981; 1983; 1985; 1987; 1989; 1991; 1993; 1995; 1997; 1999; 2001; 2003; 2005; 2007; 2009; 2011; 2013; 2015; 2017; 2019; 2021

Bahamas participated at the 2017 Summer Universiade, in Taipei, Taiwan with 4 competitors in 1 sport.

== Competitors ==
The following table lists Bahamas' delegation per sport and gender.

| Sport | Men | Women | Total |
|---|---|---|---|
| Swimming | 1 | 3 | 4 |
| Total | 1 | 3 | 4 |

== Medal summary ==
Medals by sport
| Sport | 1st place, gold medalist(s) | 2nd place, silver medalist(s) | 3rd place, bronze medalist(s) | Total |
| Swimming | 0 | 1 | 1 | 2 |
| Total | 0 | 1 | 1 | 2 |

== Swimming ==
| Athlete | Event | Heat | | Semifinal | | Final | |
| Athlete | Event | Time | Rank | Time | Rank | Time | Rank |
|---|---|---|---|---|---|---|---|
| Joanna Lynn Evans | Women's 100m Freestyle | 56.99 | 2 | did not advance | | | |
| Joanna Lynn Evans | Women's 200m Freestyle | 2:00.04 | 2Q | 1:59.19 | 3Q | 2:00.70 | 8 |
| Joanna Lynn Evans | Women's 800m Freestyle | 8:36.89 | 4Q | — | | 8:31.18 | 3rd place, bronze medalist(s) |
| Joanna Lynn Evans | Women's 400m Freestyle | 4:12.52 | 2Q | — | | 4:08.52 | 2nd place, silver medalist(s) |
| Gershwin Stafford Greene | Men's 50m Butterfly | 26.25 | 4 | did not advance | | | |
| Gershwin Stafford Greene | Men's 100m Freestyle | 53.30 | 5 | did not advance | | | |
| Gershwin Stafford Greene | Men's 50m Freestyle | 23.96 | 3 | did not advance | | | |
| Margaret Albury Higgs | Women's 100m Breaststroke | 1:13.13 | 5 | did not advance | | | |
| Margaret Albury Higgs | Women's 100m Individual Medley | 2:21.97 | 2 | did not advance | | | |
| Margaret Albury Higgs | Women's 200m Breaststroke | 2:34.91 | 2 | did not advance | | | |
| Margaret Albury Higgs | Women's 50m Breaststroke | 33.57 | 1 | did not advance | | | |
| Laura Jane Morley | Women's 100m Breaststroke | 1:12.07 | 1 | did not advance | | | |
| Laura Jane Morley | Women's 200m Breaststroke | 2:33.77 | 6 | did not advance | | | |
| Laura Jane Morley | Women's 50m Breaststroke | 34.88 | 8 | did not advance | | | |
