= Carina Doyle =

New Zealand swimmer (born 1993)

Personal information
- Born: Darwin, Northern Territory, Australia
- Height: 1.83 m (6 ft 0 in)

Sport
- Sport: Swimming
- Strokes: Freestyle
Medal record
Women's swimming
Representing New Zealand
Oceanian Championships
Gold medal – first place	2016 Suva	4 × 200 m freestyle
Gold medal – first place	2016 Suva	4 × 100 m medley
Silver medal – second place	2016 Suva	100 m freestyle
Silver medal – second place	2016 Suva	200 m freestyle
Silver medal – second place	2016 Suva	4 × 100 m freestyle
Silver medal – second place	2016 Suva	4 × 50 m mixed freestyle
Bronze medal – third place	2016 Suva	400 m freestyle

Carina Doyle is a New Zealand Olympic swimmer. In 2018 she competed at the 2018 Commonwealth Games in the Women's 4 × 100 m Freestyle Relay, and the Women's 100 m, 200 m and 400 m Freestyle events.

Doyle was born in Darwin, Australia, and lived in Dunedin before moving to Auckland.

Doyle represented New Zealand at the 2017 World University Games, where she competed in the women’s 50 m freestyle, 100 m freestyle, 200 m freestyle and 400 m freestyle. Doyle also competed at the 2016 Oceania Championships where she won silver in the 100 and 200 m freestyle, the mixed 4 × 50 m freestyle relay and the women's 4 × 100 m freestyle relay. She also won gold in the women's 4 × 200 m freestyle and 4 × 100 m medley relays and bronze in the 400 m freestyle.

Doyle is also a member of the New Zealand national surf life-saving team, and competed in the International Surf Rescue Challenge.

In 2019, she competed in the women's 4 × 200 metre freestyle relay at the 2019 World Aquatics Championships held in Gwangju, South Korea where New Zealand finished in 10th place in the heats.
