= Nao Horomura =

Japanese swimmer (born 1999)

Personal information
- Born: 31 January 1999 (age 27)

Sport
- Sport: Swimming
- Strokes: Butterfly
Medal record
Men's swimming
Representing Japan
Asian Games
Silver medal – second place	2018 Jakarta	200 m butterfly
Silver medal – second place	2018 Jakarta	4×100 m medley
Junior Pan Pacific Championships
Gold medal – first place	2016 Maui	100 m butterfly
Gold medal – first place	2016 Maui	200 m butterfly
Silver medal – second place	2016 Maui	4×100 m medley

Nao Horomura (幌村 尚, Horomura Nao; born 31 January 1999) is a Japanese swimmer. He competed in the men's 200 metre butterfly event at the 2018 Asian Games, winning the silver medal.
