= Nigeria at the 2017 Summer Universiade =

- IOC code: NGR

in Taipei July 19-30
- Competitors: 1 (29 men & 30 women) in 7 sports
- Medals: Gold 0 Silver 0 Bronze 0 Total 0

Summer Universiade appearances
- 1959; 1961; 1963; 1965; 1967; 1970; 1973; 1975; 1977; 1979; 1981; 1983; 1985; 1987; 1989; 1991; 1993; 1995; 1997; 1999; 2001; 2003; 2005; 2007; 2009; 2011; 2013; 2015; 2017; 2019; 2021

Nigeria participated at the 2017 Summer Universiade which was held in Taipei, Taiwan.

Nigeria sent a delegation consisting of 59 competitors for the event competing in 7 sporting events. Nigeria didn't win any medals at the multi-sport event.

== Participants ==
Sport	Men	Women	Total
Athletics	7	7	14
Badminton	4	4	8
Judo	4	5	9
Swimming	6	5	11
Table tennis	0	4	4
Taekwondo	4	1	5
Tennis	4	4	8
