= Czech Republic at the 2017 Summer Universiade =

- IOC code: CZE
- NOC: Czech Olympic Committee
- Website: www.olympic.cz

in Taipei, Taiwan 19 – 30 July 2017
- Competitors: 139 in 14 sports
- Medals Ranked 39th: Gold 1 Silver 0 Bronze 2 Total 3

Summer Universiade appearances (overview)
- 1993; 1995; 1997; 1999; 2001; 2003; 2005; 2007; 2009; 2011; 2013; 2015; 2017; 2019; 2021; 2025; 2027

The Czech Republic participated at the 2017 Summer Universiade, in Taipei, Taiwan with 139 competitors in 14 sports.

== Competitors ==
The following table lists the Czech Republic's delegation per sport and gender.

Sport	Men	Women	Total
Archery	3	1	4
Athletics	10	7	17
Baseball	22	0	22
Basketball	12	12	24
Fencing	2	0	2
Golf	1	3	4
Gymnastics	1	1	2
Judo	5	1	6
Roller Sports	4	0	4
Swimming	6	6	12
Table tennis	4	4	8
Tennis	2	3	5
Volleyball	12	12	24
Weightlifting	3	2	5
Total	87	52	139

== Medal summary ==
=== Medal by sports ===
Medals by sport
Sport	1st place, gold medalist(s)	2nd place, silver medalist(s)	3rd place, bronze medalist(s)	Total
Athletics	1	0	2	3
Total	1	0	2	3

== Archery ==
Athlete	Event	Ranking round		Round of 96	Round of 48	Round of 32	Round of 16	Quarterfinals	Semifinals	Final / BM	
Athlete	Event	Score	Seed	Opposition Score	Opposition Score	Opposition Score	Opposition Score	Opposition Score	Opposition Score	Opposition Score	Rank
Michal Hlahulek	Men's Recurve Individual	604	59	Adam Jurzak (POL); W 6-4	Heorhiy Ivanytskyy (UKR); L 0-6	Did not advance					33
David Jaroch	Men's Recurve Individual	592	67	Atiq Bazil Bakri (MAS); L 3-7	Did not advance						57
Vit Vejrazka	Men's Recurve Individual	603	61	Vladimir Hurban (SVK); L 2-6	Did not advance						57
Jindriska Vaneckova	Women's Recurve Individual	581	45	Bye	Farida Tukebayeva (KAZ); L 0-6	Did not advance					33
Hlahulek; Jaroch; Vejrazka	Men's Recurve Team	1799	18	—			Did not advance				18
Hlahulek; Vaneckova	Mixed Recurve Team	1185	20	—			Did not advance				20

== Athletics ==
=== Track Events ===
Athlete	Event	Round 1		Round 2		Semifinal		Final	
Athlete	Event	Result	Rank	Result	Rank	Result	Rank	Result	Rank
Lukas Hodbod	Men's 800m	1:51.17	4q	—		1:49.40	6	Did not advance	
Martin Juranek	Men's 400m Hurdles	1:52.28	5	—		Did not advance			
Eva Krchova	Women's 3000m Steeplechase	—						10:13.12	7
Kristiina Maki	Women's 1500m	4:19.86	3Q	—				4:20.65	3rd place, bronze medalist(s)
Kristiina Maki	Women's 5000m	—						15:59.87	6
Vit Mueller	Men's 400m Hurdles	50.95	3Q	—		51.46	5	Did not advance	
Marcela Pirkova	Women's 200m	23.98	3Q	—		24.11	5	Did not advance	
Barbora Prochazkova	Women's 100m	11.71	2Q	11.75	3Q	11.73	6	Did not advance	
Barbora Prochazkova	Women's 200m	23.75	2Q	—		23.72	3q	23.78	5
Vaclav Sedlack	Men's 110m Hurdles	14.35	4q	—		14.25	6	Did not advance	
Lucie Sekanova	Women's 3000m Steeplechase	—						10:19.38	8
Filip Snejdr	Men's 800m	1:51.40	3Q	—		1:49.04	2Q	1:48.31	7
Zdenek Stromsik	Men's 100m	10.50	3Q	10.68	6	Did not advance			
Jan Tesar	Men's 400m	47.22	3q	—		46.77	5	Did not advance	
Dominik Zalesky	Men's 100m	10.63	3Q	12.18	8	Did not advance			
Hodbod; Juranek; Mueller; Snejdr; Tesar	Men's 4x400m Relay	3:08.88	2Q	—				3:08.14	3rd place, bronze medalist(s)

=== Field Events ===
Athlete	Event	Qualification		Final	
Athlete	Event	Distance	Position	Distance	Position
Radek Juska	Men's Long Jump	8.31	1Q	8.02	1st place, gold medalist(s)
Tereza Kralova	Women's Hammer	65.25	3Q	65.06	8
Irena Sediva	Women's Javelin	54.25	5q	56.24	11

=== Combined Events ===
Decathlon

Athlete	Event	100 m	LJ	SP	HJ	400 m	110H	DT	PV	JT	1500 m	Final	Rank
Marek Lukas	Result	11.37	6.53	14.45	1.80	50.64	15.00	39.28	4.60	67.20	4:51.34	7400	5
Marek Lukas	Points	780	704	756	627	785	850	650	790	847	611	7400	5

== Baseball ==
Group stage

Team	Pld	W	L	RF	RA	Pct
Czech Republic	3	2	1	16	21	0.67
South Korea	3	2	1	21	7	0.67
Chinese Taipei	3	1	2	17	10	0.33
France	3	1	2	11	27	0.33

August 20, 2017; 18:30 (UTC+8)	Czech Republic	4–3	South Korea	Xinzhuang Baseball Stadium, New Taipei City; Attendance: 800
August 20, 2017; 18:30 (UTC+8)		Boxscore		Xinzhuang Baseball Stadium, New Taipei City; Attendance: 800

August 22, 2017; 18:30 (UTC+8)	Chinese Taipei	11–0	Czech Republic	Tianmu Baseball Stadium, Taipei City; Attendance: 7,794
August 22, 2017; 18:30 (UTC+8)		Boxscore		Tianmu Baseball Stadium, Taipei City; Attendance: 7,794

August 23, 2017; 11:00 (UTC+8)	Czech Republic	12–7	France	Xinzhuang Baseball Stadium, New Taipei City; Attendance: 347
August 23, 2017; 11:00 (UTC+8)		Boxscore		Xinzhuang Baseball Stadium, New Taipei City; Attendance: 347

Super Round

Team	Pld	W	L	RF	RA	Pct
Japan	3	3	0	21	7	1.00
United States	3	2	1	19	15	0.67
Czech Republic	3	1	2	5	19	0.33
South Korea	3	0	3	8	12	0.00

August 25, 2017; 18:30 (UTC+8)	Czech Republic	0–8	United States	Tianmu Baseball Stadium, Taipei City; Attendance: 2,364
August 25, 2017; 18:30 (UTC+8)		Boxscore		Tianmu Baseball Stadium, Taipei City; Attendance: 2,364

August 26, 2017; 18:30 (UTC+8)	Czech Republic	1–8	Japan	Tianmu Baseball Stadium, Taipei City; Attendance: 0
August 26, 2017; 18:30 (UTC+8)		Boxscore		Tianmu Baseball Stadium, Taipei City; Attendance: 0

August 28, 2017; 11:00 (UTC+8)	United States	8–4	Czech Republic	Tianmu Baseball Stadium, Taipei City; Attendance: 1,078
August 28, 2017; 11:00 (UTC+8)		Boxscore		Tianmu Baseball Stadium, Taipei City; Attendance: 1,078

Bronze medal game

August 29, 2017; 12:00 (UTC+8)	South Korea	6–2	Czech Republic	Tianmu Baseball Stadium, Taipei City; Attendance: 1,020
August 29, 2017; 12:00 (UTC+8)		Boxscore		Tianmu Baseball Stadium, Taipei City; Attendance: 1,020

== Basketball ==
=== Men's tournament ===
Group stage

Team	Pld	W	L	PF	PA	PD	Pts
United States	5	5	0	544	330	+214	10
Argentina	5	4	1	433	306	+127	9
Estonia	5	3	2	377	381	−4	8
Czech Republic	5	2	3	391	392	−1	7
Romania	5	1	4	350	408	−58	6
United Arab Emirates	5	0	5	284	562	−278	5

20 August 2017
15:00 (UTC+8)

Report

Romania	60–72	Czech Republic
Scoring by quarter: 13–18, 20–22, 15–17, 12–15

Taipei Heping Basketball Gymnasium
Referees: S. Chebyshev (UKR), V. Maciulaitis (LTU), S.H. Wei (TPE)

21 August 2017
10:00 (UTC+8)

Report

Czech Republic	49–87	Argentina
Scoring by quarter: 17–14, 11–28, 10–27, 11–18

Taipei Arena
Referees: S. Beliakov (RUS), P. Marques (POR), S. Arisawa (JAP)

23 August 2017
17:30 (UTC+8)

Report

Czech Republic	78–107	United States
Scoring by quarter: 14–32, 32–24, 18–26, 14–25

Taipei Arena
Referees: J.R. Chapman (AUS), G. Vitkauskas (LTU), C.H. Chen (TPE)

24 August 2017
20:00 (UTC+8)

Report

Estonia	80–78	Czech Republic
Scoring by quarter: 18–26, 29–16, 12–16, 21–20

University of Taipei (Tianmu) Gymnasium
Referees: R.C. Kerrison (CAN), S. Emlek (TUR), H.S. Carrizales (MEX)

25 August 2017
12:30 (UTC+8)

Report

Czech Republic	114–58	United Arab Emirates
Scoring by quarter: 26–13, 32–14, 34–20, 22–11

Taipei Heping Basketball Gymnasium
Referees: P. Marques (POR), S.H. Wei (TPE), B.M. Kyambadde (UGA)

9th-16th place quarterfinal

27 August 2017
17:30 (UTC+8)

Report

Ukraine	79–84	Czech Republic
Scoring by quarter: 21–18, 20–20, 17–25, 21–21

University of Taipei (Tianmu) Gymnasium
Referees: V. Maciukaitis (LTU), G. Kapitany (HUN), A. Csender (ROU)

9th-12th place semifinal

28 August 2017
15:00 (UTC+8)

Report

Canada	97–79	Czech Republic
Scoring by quarter: 17–18, 29–20, 27–18, 24–23

Taipei Heping Basketball Gymnasium
Referees: T. Suslov (EST), G. Vitkauskas (LTU), K.N. Apellaniz (USA)

11th place game

29 August 2017
17:30 (UTC+8)

Report

Czech Republic	69–93	Mexico
Scoring by quarter: 11–19, 15–24, 18–25, 25–25

Hsinchu Municipal Gymnasium
Referees: L.D. Zalazar (ARG), J.R. Chapman (AUS), A.M. Del Col (CAN)

=== Women's tournament ===
Group stage

Team	Pld	W	L	PF	PA	PD	Pts
United States	3	3	0	296	139	+157	6
Czech Republic	3	2	1	194	184	+10	5
Poland	3	1	2	193	216	−23	4
Uganda	3	0	3	150	294	−144	3

21 August 2017
15:00 (UTC+8)

Report

Czech Republic	57–52	Poland
Scoring by quarter: 13–15, 21–15, 10–12, 13–10

Hsinchu Municipal Gymnasium
Referees: O. Lucis (LAT), A.M. Del Col (CAN), S.H. Wei (TPE)

22 August 2017
12:30 (UTC+8)

Report

Uganda	59–85	Czech Republic
Scoring by quarter: 15–25, 18–24, 11–15, 15–21

University of Taipei (Tianmu) Gymnasium
Referees: G. Vitkauskas (LTU), S.H. Chen (TPE), Y.S. An (KOR)

23 August 2017
20:00 (UTC+8)

Report

United States	73–52	Czech Republic
Scoring by quarter: 15–17, 24–15, 20–3, 14–17

Taipei Heping Basketball Gymnasium
Referees: A. Davydov (RUS), V. Györgyi (NOR), J. Smiljanic (SRB)

Quarterfinal

25 August 2017
20 :00 (UTC+8)

Report

Russia	69–54	Czech Republic
Scoring by quarter: 23–11, 15–17, 18–16, 13–10

Taipei Arena
Referees: J.R. Chapman (AUS), A.M. Del Col (CAN), M.A. Prado (ARG)

5th-8th place semifinal

26 August 2017
20:00 (UTC+8)

Report

Sweden	85–76	Czech Republic
Scoring by quarter: 23–8, 25–21, 21–16, 16–31

Taipei Heping Basketball Gymnasium
Referees: T. Benczur (HUN), A. Csender (ROU), K.N. Apellaniz (USA)

7th place game

28 August 2017
10:00 (UTC+8)

Report

Canada	84–68	Czech Republic
Scoring by quarter: 17–16, 19–14, 20–18, 28–20

Taipei Arena
Referees: G.A. Todey (USA), F.V. Barrera (CHI), C.H. Chen (TPE)

== Fencing ==
Athlete	Event	Round of 128	Round of 64	Round of 32	Round of 16	Quarterfinal	Semifinal	Final / BM	
Athlete	Event	Opposition Score	Opposition Score	Opposition Score	Opposition Score	Opposition Score	Opposition Score	Opposition Score	Rank
Richard Pokorny	Men's Epee Individual	—	Daniel Berta (HUN); L 12-15	Did not advance					40
Martin Rubes	Men's Epee Individual	—	Max Rod (POR); W 15-12	Filip Broniszewski (POL); L 13-15	Did not advance				18

== Golf ==
Athlete	Event	Round 1	Round 2	Round 3	Total	
Athlete	Event	Score	Score	Score	Score	Rank
Martin Hromadka	Men's Individual	80	77	77	234	50
Kristyna Abrahamova	Women's Individual	74	72	77	223	16
Adela Cejnarova	Women's Individual	80	74	78	232	30
Katerina Vlasinova	Women's Individual	84	74	71	229	27
Abrahamova; Cejnarova; Vlasinova	Women's Team	154	146	148	448	8

== Gymnastics ==
=== Artistic ===
Athlete	Event	Apparatus						Total	Rank
Athlete	Event	F	PH	R	V	PB	HB	Total	Rank
David Jessen	Team	11.350	12.050	12.950	13.450	11.950	13.175	74.925	35

=== Rhythmic ===
Athlete	Event	Apparatus					
Athlete	Event	Hoop	Ball	Clubs	Ribbon	Total	Rank
Andrea Kheilova	Individual All-Around	11.050	10.950	10.250	11.700	43.950	29

== Judo ==
Athlete	Event	Round of 64	Round of 32	Round of 16	Quarterfinals	Repechage 32	Repechage 16	Repechage 8	Final Repechage	Semifinals	Final / BM	
Athlete	Event	Opposition Result	Opposition Result	Opposition Result	Opposition Result	Opposition Result	Opposition Result	Opposition Result	Opposition Result	Opposition Result	Opposition Result	Rank
Vaclav Cerny	Men's -73 kg	Bilal Ciloglu (AZE); L 00-03	Did not advance									
Jelizaveta Gerasimenko	Women's -52 kg	—	Elaine Rae Ramos-Tandjung (USA); W 10-00	Judith Carla Gonzalez Jaque (CHI); L 00S1-01S1	Did not advance							
Tomas Knapek	Men's -100 kg	—	Bye	Danylo Hutsol (UKR); L 00-10	Did not advance							
Tomas Knapek	Men's Open Category	—	Bye	Rokas Nenartavicius (LTU); W 03S1-01S1	Hyoga Ota (JPN); L 00-10	—	Bye	Sheng-Min Chen (TPE); L 00-10	Did not advance			
Ivan Petr	Men's -81 kg	Andranik Chaparyan (ARM); W 11S2-00S2	Steven Azar (LBN); W 11-00	Toraj Chenari (IRI); W 10-00S1	Wei-Cheng Chang (TPE); W 10-01S1	Bye				Aslan Lappinagov (RUS); L 00S1-11	Robin Gutsche (GER); L 00-10S1	5
Jiri Petr	Men's -90 kg	Shoichiro Mukai (JPN); L 00S2-01S2	Bye				Mike Chavanne (SUI); W 03-01	Firudin Dadashov (AZE); L 00-11	Did not advance			
Jan Zavadil	Men's -66 kg	Abdula Abdulzhalilov (RUS); L 00S1-11S1	Did not advance									
Cerny; Knapek; I. Petr; J. Petr; Zavadil	Men's Team	—	Algeria (ALG); L 1-4	Did not advance								

== Roller Sports ==
Athlete	Event	Preliminary		Semifinal		Final	
Athlete	Event	Time	Rank	Time	Rank	Time/Points	Rank
Tomas Brabenec	Men's 10000m Points-Elimination	—				EL	14
Tomas Brabenec	Men's 1000m Sprint	—		1:38.955	7	Did not advance	
Tomas Brabenec	Men's Marathon	—				1:12:40.765	22
Matej Pravda	Men's 300m Time Trial	25.262	7q	—		25.210	7
Matej Pravda	Men's 1000m Sprint	—		1:27.377	4	Did not advance	
Matej Pravda	Men's 500m Sprint	40.457	2Q	41.653	3	Did not advance	
Matej Pravda	Men's Marathon	—				DNF	—
Michal Prokop	Men's 10000m Points-Elimination	—				EL	7
Michal Prokop	Men's 15000m Elimination	—				EL	5
Michal Prokop	Men's 500m Sprint	44.601	4	Did not advance			
Michal Prokop	Men's Marathon	—				1:07:22.434	11
Stepan Svab	Men's 300m Time Trial	29.330	18	—		Did not advance	
Stepan Svab	Men's 15000m Elimination	—				EL	5
Stepan Svab	Men's Marathon	—				1:10:20.587	20
Pravda; Prokop; Brabenec	Men's 3000m Relay	4:17.666	4	—		Did not advance	

== Swimming ==
=== Men ===
Athlete	Event	Heat		Semifinal		Final	
Athlete	Event	Time	Rank	Time	Rank	Time	Rank
Tomas Havranek	200m Individual Medley	2:05.33	5	Did not advance			
Tomas Havranek	200m Butterfly	2:00.74	6	Did not advance			
Tomas Havranek	100m Butterfly	55.17	6	Did not advance			
Vit Ingeduld	Marathon	—				2:01:54.0	15
Matej Kozubek	Marathon	—				2:01:49.5	13
Jan Micka	400m Freestyle	3:55.16	7	—		Did not advance	
Jan Micka	1500m Freestyle	15:30.23	6	—		Did not advance	
Jan Micka	800m Freestyle	8:01.57	5	—		Did not advance	
Josef Moser	50m Butterfly	25.10	4	Did not advance			
Josef Moser	200m Freestyle	1:54.31	7	Did not advance			
Josef Moser	100m Freestyle	50.41	2	Did not advance			
Josef Moser	50m Freestyle	23.52	4	Did not advance			
Jan Sefl	50m Butterfly	24.26	5	23.79	5	Did not advance	
Jan Sefl	100m Freestyle	50.98	3	Did not advance			
Jan Sefl	100m Butterfly	53.14	4	53.29	7	Did not advance	
Jan Sefl	50m Freestyle	23.77	7	Did not advance			
Havranek; Micka; Moser; Sefl	4x100m Freestyle Relay	DNS	—			Did not advance	

=== Women ===
Athlete	Event	Heat		Semifinal		Final	
Athlete	Event	Time	Rank	Time	Rank	Time	Rank
Martina Elhenicka	100m Freestyle	57.60	1	Did not advance			
Martina Elhenicka	1500m Freestyle	17:27.24	7	—		Did not advance	
Martina Elhenicka	200m Freestyle	2:07.21	7	Did not advance			
Martina Elhenicka	50m Freestyle	26.90	3	Did not advance			
Martina Elhenicka	Marathon	—				DNS	—
Martina Elhenicka	Kristyna Horska	400m Individual Medley	4:51.03	6	—		Did not advance
200m Individual Medley	Kristyna Horska	2:17.53	5	2:15.41	6	Did not advance	
Vera Koprivova	200m Backstroke	2:14.64	5	2:14.18	7	Did not advance	
Vera Koprivova	100m Backstroke	1:03.44	4	Did not advance			
Vera Koprivova	50m Backstroke	30.28	7	Did not advance			
Lenka Sterbova	Marathon	—				2:14:51.2	13
Barbora Zavadova	400m Individual Medley	4:43.82	3	—		4:44.30	6
Barbora Zavadova	200m Individual Medley	2:16.28	3	2:14.53	2	2:16.34	8
Barbora Zavadova	100m Butterfly	1:01.40	2	Did not advance			
Barbora Zavadova	50m Backstroke	29.92	8	Did not advance			
Barbora Zavadova	200m Butterfly	2:15.27	6	2:13.86	7	Did not advance	
Tereza Zavadova	1500m Freestyle	17:07.04	7	—		Did not advance	
Tereza Zavadova	200m Freestyle	DNS	—	Did not advance			
Tereza Zavadova	800m Freestyle	8:58.42	3	—		Did not advance	
Tereza Zavadova	400m Freestyle	4:23.07	7	—		Did not advance	
Elhenicka; Koprivova; B. Zavadova; T. Zavadova	4x200m Freestyle Relay	8:22.41	6	—		Did not advance	
Elhenicka; Horska; Koprivova; Zavadova	4x100m Medley Relay	DNS	—			Did not advance	

== Table Tennis ==
Athlete	Event	Group stage			Round of 128	Round of 64	Round of 32	Round of 16	Quarterfinals	Semifinals	Final / BM	
Athlete	Event	Opposition Result	Opposition Result	Opposition Result	Opposition Result	Opposition Result	Opposition Result	Opposition Result	Opposition Result	Opposition Result	Opposition Result	Rank
Ondrej Bajger	Men's Singles	Toomas Vestli (EST); W 3-0	Al Khalil Ahmed Al Brashdi (OMA); W 3-0	—		Adam Valentine Harrison (GBR); W 4-0	Hung-Chieh Chiang (TPE); L 0-4	Did not advance				
Michal Benes	Men's Singles	Willhelm Percan Kindblad (SWE); W 3-2	Thibaut Philipp Darcis (BEL); L 2-3	—		Did not advance						
Stanislav Kucera	Men's Singles	Pavol Mego (SVK); L 0-3	Lucian Munteanu (ROU); W 3-1	—		Did not advance						
David Reitspies	Men's Singles	Ioannis Papadakis (GRE); W 3-2	Zikang Xiao (MAC); W 3-0	—		Timur Kelbuganov (KAZ); W 4-1	Wi Hun Kang (PRK); L 0-4	Did not advance				
Bajger/Reitspies	Men's Doubles	—			Bye	Agbon/Cabaluna (PHI); W 3-0	Boyajian/Hamdar (LBN); W 3-0	Lee/Liao (TPE); L 1-3	Did not advance			
Benes/Kucera	Men's Doubles	—			Bye	Qiu/Spreckelsen (GER); W 3-1	Chen/Chiang (TPE); L 0-3	Did not advance				
Bajger; Benes; Kucera; Reitspies	Men's Team	Colombia (COL); W 3-0	Chinese Taipei (TPE); L 0-3	Singapore (SGP); W 3-1	—			Republic of Korea (KOR); L 2-3	Did not advance			
Karin Adamkova	Women's Singles	Sophia Shujin Dong (NZL); W 3-0	Yi Xuan Lim (SGP); W 3-0	—		Agustina Iwasa (ARG); W 4-0	Judith Liu (FRA); L 2-4	Did not advance				
Aneta Kucerova	Women's Singles	Erica Shen-Ning Wu (USA); L 2-3	Annick Gabriell Stammet (LUX); W 3-0	—		Did not advance						
Aneta Kucerova	Women's Singles	Diana Oliverio (PHI); W 3-1	Oceane Guisnel (FRA); W 3-0	—		Song I Kim (PRK); L 0-4	Did not advance					
Tamara Tomanova	Women's Singles	Memory Chikusi (ZAM); W 3-0	Alina Arlouskaya (BLR); L 0-3	—		Did not advance						
Adamkova/Kucerova	Women's Doubles	—			Bye	Enkhbat/Ganzorig (MGL); W 3-0	Codina/Iwasa (ARG); W 3-0	Choe/Kim (PRK); L 0-3	Did not advance			
Mikulcova/Tomanova	Women's Doubles	—			Bye	Duran Abarca/Morales Escobar (CHI); W 3-0	Ciobanu/Szocs (ROU); L 0-3	Did not advance				
Guo; Lau; Liaw; Luo; Yan	Women's Team	Mongolia (MGL); W 3-0	Chinese Taipei (TPE); L 0-3	United Kingdom (GBR); W 3-0	—			Russia (RUS); L 0-3	Did not advance			
Bajger/Tomanova	Mixed Doubles	—			Bye	Wong/Liu (HKG); L 2-3	Did not advance					
Kucera/Adamkova	Mixed Doubles	—			Bye	Eihmans/Belanovica (LAT); W 3-0	Munteanu/Ciobanu (ROU); L 0-3	Did not advance				

== Tennis ==
Athlete	Event	Round 1	Round 2	Round 3	Round 4	Quarterfinals	Semifinals	Final / BM	
Athlete	Event	Opposition Score	Opposition Score	Opposition Score	Opposition Score	Opposition Score	Opposition Score	Opposition Score	Rank
Dominik Kellovský	Men's Singles	Bye	Esben Hess-Olesen (DEN); L 0-2	Did not advance					
Matěj Vocel	Men's Singles	Bye	Mads Engsted (DEN); W 2-0	Jack Findel-Hawkins (GBR); W 2-0	Jason Jung (TPE); L 0-2	Did not advance			
Kellovský/Vocel	Men's Doubles	Aranguren/Suanno (ARG); W 2-0	Byreddy/Kumar (IND); W 2-0	—		Imai/Uesugi (JPN); L 1-2	Did not advance		
Miriam Kolodziejova	Women's Singles	Bye	Vilma Yaed Gomez (COL); W 2-0	Ho Ching Wu (HKG); W 2-0	P. Cheapchandej (THA); L 1-2	Did not advance			
Pernilla Mendesova	Women's Singles	Bye	Preety Baral (NEP); W WO-0	Justyna Jegiolka (POL); W 2-0	Wongteanchai (THA); L 1-2	Did not advance			
Mendesova/Rutarova	Women's Doubles	Asprino/Moura (BRA); W 2-0	Wongteanchai/Wongteanchai (THA); L 0-2	—		Did not advance			
Kolodziejova/Kellovský	Mixed Doubles	Bye	Abeyanayake/Rajendra (SRI); W 2-0	Zitnik/Brglez (SLO); W 2-0	—	Hsieh/Chan (TPE); L 0-2	Did not advance		

== Volleyball ==
=== Men's tournament ===
Group stage

Pos	Team	Pld	W	L	Pts	SW	SL	SR	SPW	SPL	SPR	Qualification
1	Russia	5	5	0	15	15	1	15.000	411	335	1.227	Quarterfinals
2	Czech Republic	5	4	1	11	12	6	2.000	415	366	1.134	Quarterfinals
3	Romania	5	3	2	9	11	7	1.571	427	403	1.060	9th–16th place
4	Hong Kong	5	2	3	5	8	13	0.615	411	464	0.886	9th–16th place
5	Australia	5	1	4	4	6	13	0.462	420	429	0.979	17th–22nd place
6	Chile	5	0	5	1	3	15	0.200	335	422	0.794	17th–22nd place

Date	Time		Score		Set 1	Set 2	Set 3	Set 4	Set 5	Total	Report
20 Aug	15:00	Czech Republic	3–0	Australia	25–15	25–23	25–20			75–58	P2 P3
21 Aug	13:00	Romania	1–3	Czech Republic	27–29	20–25	25–19	23–25		95–98	P2 P3
22 Aug	15:00	Czech Republic	3–0	Chile	25–10	25–16	25–18			75–44	P2 P3
24 Aug	15:00	Czech Republic	0–3	Russia	22–25	23–25	17–25			62–75	P2P3
25 Aug	18:00	Hong Kong	2–3	Czech Republic	25–20	13–25	21–25	25–20	10–15	94–105	P2 P3

Quarterfinals

Date	Time		Score		Set 1	Set 2	Set 3	Set 4	Set 5	Total	Report
27 Aug	13:00	Iran	3–0	Czech Republic	25–14	25–23	25–20			75–57	P2 P3

5th–8th place semifinals

Date	Time		Score		Set 1	Set 2	Set 3	Set 4	Set 5	Total	Report
28 Aug	13:00	Czech Republic	1–3	Brazil	25–23	18–25	20–25	21–25		84–98	P2 P3

7th place match

Date	Time		Score		Set 1	Set 2	Set 3	Set 4	Set 5	Total	Report
29 Aug	18:00	Portugal	1–3	Czech Republic	25–22	21–25	21–25	22–25		89–97	P2 P3

=== Women's tournament ===
Group stage

Pos	Team	Pld	W	L	Pts	SW	SL	SR	SPW	SPL	SPR	Qualification
1	Chinese Taipei	3	3	0	9	9	1	9.000	246	179	1.374	Quarterfinals
2	France	3	2	1	6	6	3	2.000	208	172	1.209	Quarterfinals
3	Czech Republic	3	1	2	3	4	7	0.571	221	251	0.880	
4	Colombia	3	0	3	0	1	9	0.111	175	248	0.706	

Date	Time		Score		Set 1	Set 2	Set 3	Set 4	Set 5	Total	Report
21 Aug	18:00	Colombia	1–3	Czech Republic	25–23	21–25	11–25	23–25		80–98	P2 P3
22 Aug	15:00	Chinese Taipei	3–1	Czech Republic	25–15	21–25	25–17	25–19		96–76	P2 P3
23 Aug	18:00	Czech Republic	0–3	France	14–25	10–25	23–25			47–75	P2 P3

9th–16th place quarterfinals

Date	Time		Score		Set 1	Set 2	Set 3	Set 4	Set 5	Total	Report
25 Aug	18:00	Czech Republic	3–1	Canada	25–20	14–25	25–12	25–17		89–74	P2 P3

9th-12th place semifinals

Date	Time		Score		Set 1	Set 2	Set 3	Set 4	Set 5	Total	Report
26 Aug	18:00	Czech Republic	2–3	United States	25–20	25–19	24–26	11–25	11–15	96–105	P2 P3

11th place match

Date	Time		Score		Set 1	Set 2	Set 3	Set 4	Set 5	Total	Report
27 Aug	18:00	Czech Republic	0–3	Switzerland	19–25	19–25	10–25			48–75	P2 P3

== Weightlifting ==
Athlete	Event	Snatch		Clean & jerk		Total	Rank
Athlete	Event	Result	Rank	Result	Rank	Total	Rank
Jiri Gasior	Men's 105 kg	150	10	189	9	339	9
Tereza Kralova	Women's 90 kg	77	8	90	8	167	8
Patrik Krywult	Men's 105 kg	154	10	DNF			—
Petr Petrov	Men's 69 kg	135	7	165	7	300	8
Eliska Pudivitrova	Women's 75 kg	80	9	94	10	174	10
