= Paraguay at the 2017 Summer Universiade =

- IOC code: PAR
- NOC: Comité Olímpico Paraguayo

in Taipei July 19-30
- Competitors: 10 (7 men & 3 women) in 2 sports
- Medals: Gold 0 Silver 0 Bronze 0 Total 0

Summer Universiade appearances
- 1959; 1961; 1963; 1965; 1967; 1970; 1973; 1975; 1977; 1979; 1981; 1983; 1985; 1987; 1989; 1991; 1993; 1995; 1997; 1999; 2001; 2003; 2005; 2007; 2009; 2011; 2013; 2015; 2017; 2019; 2021

Paraguay participated at the 2017 Summer Universiade which was held in Taipei, Taiwan.

Paraguay sent a delegation consisting of 10 competitors for the event competing in 2 sporting events. Paraguay didn't win any medals in the multi-sport event.

== Participants ==
Sport	Men	Women	Total
Athletics	1	0	1
Swimming	6	3	9
