= 2018 FINA World Swimming Championships (25 m) – Women's 100 metre butterfly =

Women's 100 metre butterfly at the 2018 FINA World Swimming Championships (25 m)
- Venue: Hangzhou Olympic Sports Center
- Dates: 15 December (heats and semifinals); 16 December (final)
- Competitors: 45
- Winning time: 55.01

Medalists
gold medal	Kelsi Dahlia	United States
silver medal	Kendyl Stewart	United States
bronze medal	Daiene Dias	Brazil

The Women's 100 metre butterfly competition of the 2018 FINA World Swimming Championships (25 m) was held on 15 and 16 December 2018 at the Hangzhou Olympic Sports Center.

== Records ==
Prior to the competition, the existing world and championship records were as follows.

	Name	Nation	Time	Location	Date
World record Championship record	Sarah Sjöström	Sweden	54.61	Doha	7 December 2014

== Results ==
=== Heats ===
The heats were started on 15 December at 10:22.

Rank	Heat	Lane	Name	Nationality	Time	Notes
1	5	4	Kelsi Dahlia	United States	55.46	Q
2	4	6	Ai Soma	Japan	56.52	Q
3	5	2	Kendyl Stewart	United States	56.57	Q
4	3	3	Elena Di Liddo	Italy	56.62	Q
5	3	5	Daiene Dias	Brazil	56.78	Q
6	5	5	Ilaria Bianchi	Italy	56.85	Q
7	5	9	Haley Black	Canada	57.10	Q
8	5	6	Wang Yichun	China	57.12	Q
9	4	4	Zhang Yufei	China	57.21	Q
10	4	5	Aliena Schmidtke	Germany	57.23	Q
11	3	4	Svetlana Chimrova	Russia	57.36	Q
12	3	6	Yukina Hirayama	Japan	57.59	Q
13	3	2	Anna Ntountounaki	Greece	57.64	Q
14	4	3	Kim Busch	Netherlands	57.76	Q
15	4	7	Anastasiya Shkurdai	Belarus	58.10	Q
16	5	8	Park Ye-rin	South Korea	58.22	Q
17	3	7	Emilie Løvberg	Norway	58.24	
18	5	7	Erin Gallagher	South Africa	58.29	
19	4	1	Alexandra Touretski	Switzerland	58.34	
20	4	0	Amina Kajtaz	Bosnia and Herzegovina	58.78	
21	4	2	Daria Kartashova	Russia	58.86	
22	5	1	Chan Kin Lok	Hong Kong	58.89	
23	3	1	Lucie Svěcená	Czech Republic	59.00	
24	5	0	Ana Monteiro	Portugal	59.27	
25	3	0	Isabella Páez	Venezuela	59.69	
26	3	8	Nida Eliz Üstündağ	Turkey	59.79	
27	4	8	Nicholle Toh	Singapore	1:00.20	
28	2	5	Celina Márquez	El Salvador	1:00.60	
29	4	9	Vanessa Ouwehand	New Zealand	1:01.46	
30	2	3	Elodie Poo-cheong	Mauritius	1:02.08	
31	2	4	Beatriz Padrón	Costa Rica	1:02.15	
32	3	9	Alexandra Schegoleva	Cyprus	1:02.62	
33	1	6	Huang Mei-chien	Chinese Taipei	1:02.96	
34	2	6	Alsu Bayramova	Azerbaijan	1:03.14	
35	2	2	Hiba Doueihy	Lebanon	1:03.51	
36	2	7	Imara-Bella Thorpe	Kenya	1:03.62	
37	1	1	Karla Abarca	Nicaragua	1:04.09	
38	1	7	Bisma Khan	Pakistan	1:04.87	
39	2	1	Michell Ramirez	Honduras	1:05.39	
40	1	2	Dirngulbai Misech	Palau	1:08.44	
40	2	8	Lara Aklouk	Jordan	1:08.44	
42	1	4	Avice Meya	Uganda	1:12.97	NR
43	2	9	Mineri Kurotori Gomez	Guam	1:15.52	
44	2	0	Celina Itatiro	Tanzania	1:21.26	
45	1	5	Aishath Sausan	Maldives	1:23.16	
	1	3	Lucie Kouadio-Patinier	Ivory Coast	DNS	
	5	3	Katinka Hosszú	Hungary	DNS	

=== Semifinals ===
The semifinals were held at 19:31.

==== Semifinal 1 ====
Rank	Lane	Name	Nationality	Time	Notes
1	5	Elena di Liddo	Italy	56.06	Q
2	4	Ai Soma	Japan	56.31	Q
3	3	Ilaria Bianchi	Italy	56.79	Q
4	6	Wang Yichun	China	56.80	Q
5	7	Yukina Hirayama	Japan	57.10	R
6	2	Aliena Schmidtke	Germany	57.27	
7	1	Kim Busch	Netherlands	57.63	
8	8	Park Ye-rin	South Korea	58.21	

==== Semifinal 2 ====
Rank	Lane	Name	Nationality	Time	Notes
1	4	Kelsi Dahlia	United States	55.09	Q
2	3	Daiene Dias	Brazil	56.40	Q, SA
3	5	Kendyl Stewart	United States	56.62	Q
4	2	Zhang Yufei	China	56.77	Q
5	6	Haley Black	Canada	56.91	R
6	8	Anastasiya Shkurdai	Belarus	57.20	
7	1	Anna Ntountounaki	Greece	57.42	
8	7	Svetlana Chimrova	Russia	57.48	

=== Final ===
The final was held at 19:08.

Rank	Lane	Name	Nationality	Time	Notes
1st place, gold medalist(s)	4	Kelsi Dahlia	United States	55.01	
2nd place, silver medalist(s)	2	Kendyl Stewart	United States	56.22	
3rd place, bronze medalist(s)	6	Daiene Dias	Brazil	56.31	SA
4	7	Ilaria Bianchi	Italy	56.39	
5	5	Elena di Liddo	Italy	56.50	
6	8	Haley Black	Canada	56.72	
7	3	Ai Soma	Japan	56.76	
8	1	Wang Yichun	China	56.96	
