= 2018 FINA World Swimming Championships (25 m) – Women's 50 metre butterfly =

Women's 50 metre butterfly at the 2018 FINA World Swimming Championships (25 m)
- Venue: WFCU Centre
- Dates: 13 December (heats and semifinals); 14 December (final)
- Winning time: 24.47

Medalists
| gold medal | Ranomi Kromowidjojo | Netherlands |
| silver medal | Holly Barratt | Australia |
| bronze medal | Kelsi Dahlia | United States |

The Women's 50 metre butterfly competition of the 2018 FINA World Swimming Championships (25 m) was held on 13 and 14 December 2018.

== Records ==
Prior to the competition, the existing world and championship records were as follows.

| | Name | Nation | Time | Location | Date |
|---|---|---|---|---|---|
| World record | Therese Alshammar | Sweden | 24.38 | Singapore | 22 November 2009 |
| Championship record | Sarah Sjöström | Sweden | 24.58 | Doha | 5 December 2014 |

== Results ==
=== Heats ===
The heats were started on 13 December at 09:40.

| Rank | Heat | Lane | Name | Nationality | Time | Notes |
|---|---|---|---|---|---|---|
| 1 | 7 | 4 | Ranomi Kromowidjojo | Netherlands | 25.32 | Q |
| 2 | 4 | 2 | Haley Black | Canada | 25.43 | Q |
| 2 | 7 | 3 | Mélanie Henique | France | 25.43 | Q |
| 4 | 6 | 4 | Kelsi Dahlia | United States | 25.49 | Q |
| 5 | 7 | 2 | Wang Yichun | China | 25.66 | Q |
| 6 | 7 | 6 | Anastasiya Shkurdai | Belarus | 25.82 | Q |
| 7 | 5 | 4 | Maaike de Waard | Netherlands | 25.83 | Q |
| 8 | 5 | 5 | Aliena Schmidtke | Germany | 25.87 | Q |
| 9 | 5 | 6 | Elena Di Liddo | Italy | 25.88 | Q |
| 10 | 6 | 3 | Arina Surkova | Russia | 25.95 | Q |
| 11 | 5 | 3 | Holly Barratt | Australia | 25.97 | Q |
| 12 | 6 | 1 | Erin Gallagher | South Africa | 26.01 | Q |
| 13 | 7 | 1 | Daiene Dias | Brazil | 26.06 | Q |
| 14 | 6 | 2 | Kendyl Stewart | United States | 26.09 | Q |
| 15 | 6 | 6 | Mimosa Jallow | Finland | 26.13 | Q |
| 16 | 5 | 7 | Yukina Hirayama | Japan | 26.14 | QSO |
| 16 | 7 | 5 | Zhang Yufei | China | 26.14 | QSO |
| 18 | 6 | 8 | Anna Ntountounaki | Greece | 26.24 | |
| 19 | 7 | 7 | Ilaria Bianchi | Italy | 26.29 | |
| 20 | 5 | 2 | Ai Soma | Japan | 26.34 | |
| 21 | 6 | 5 | Rozaliya Nasretdinova | Russia | 26.36 | |
| 22 | 5 | 1 | Alexandra Touretski | Switzerland | 26.38 | |
| 23 | 7 | 8 | Lucie Svěcená | Czech Republic | 26.43 | |
| 24 | 5 | 8 | Park Ye-rin | South Korea | 26.47 | |
| 25 | 6 | 0 | Jeserik Pinto | Venezuela | 26.52 | |
| 26 | 7 | 9 | Emilie Løvberg | Norway | 26.79 | |
| 27 | 4 | 5 | Jenjira Srisaard | Thailand | 26.86 | |
| 28 | 4 | 8 | Huang Mei-chien | Chinese Taipei | 26.92 | |
| 29 | 6 | 9 | Caroline Pilhatsch | Austria | 27.04 | |
| 30 | 5 | 0 | Chan Kin Lok | Hong Kong | 27.06 | |
| 30 | 5 | 9 | Aleyna Özkan | Turkey | 27.06 | |
| 32 | 4 | 7 | Amina Kajtaz | Bosnia and Herzegovina | 27.11 | |
| 33 | 4 | 4 | Hanna Rosvall | Sweden | 27.18 | |
| 34 | 7 | 0 | Gabriela Ņikitina | Latvia | 27.27 | |
| 35 | 4 | 3 | Tamara Potocká | Slovakia | 27.34 | |
| 36 | 4 | 1 | Nicholle Toh | Singapore | 27.51 | |
| 37 | 4 | 0 | Beatriz Padrón | Costa Rica | 27.75 | |
| 38 | 1 | 4 | María José Ribera | Bolivia | 27.76 | |
| 39 | 4 | 6 | Vanessa Ouwehand | New Zealand | 27.85 | |
| 40 | 4 | 9 | Victoria Russell | Bahamas | 27.90 | |
| 41 | 3 | 5 | Mariel Mencia | Dominican Republic | 28.45 | |
| 42 | 3 | 4 | María Hernández | Nicaragua | 28.84 | |
| 43 | 3 | 3 | Giuliana Dudok | Uruguay | 28.88 | |
| 44 | 3 | 7 | Varsenik Manucharyan | Armenia | 29.09 | NR |
| 45 | 3 | 2 | Hiba Doueihy | Lebanon | 29.21 | |
| 46 | 3 | 1 | Jamila Sanmoogan | Guyana | 29.69 | |
| 47 | 3 | 6 | Tan Chi Yan | Macau | 29.80 | |
| 48 | 3 | 8 | Annie Hepler | Marshall Islands | 29.86 | |
| 49 | 2 | 9 | Enkhzul Khuyagbaatar | Mongolia | 30.54 | |
| 50 | 2 | 2 | Maayaa Ayawere | Ghana | 30.87 | |
| 51 | 1 | 7 | Arleigha Hall | Turks and Caicos Islands | 30.95 | |
| 52 | 3 | 0 | Margie Winter | Federated States of Micronesia | 31.57 | |
| 53 | 1 | 8 | Sonia Aktar | Bangladesh | 32.48 | |
| 53 | 2 | 7 | Alicia Mateus | Mozambique | 32.48 | |
| 55 | 1 | 6 | Ayushma Tuladhar | Nepal | 32.51 | |
| 56 | 2 | 6 | Amantle Mogara | Botswana | 32.55 | |
| 57 | 2 | 0 | Andrea Schuster | Samoa | 32.65 | |
| 58 | 2 | 3 | Fatema Almahmeed | Bahrain | 32.92 | |
| 59 | 1 | 5 | Karina Klimyk | Tajikistan | 33.45 | |
| 60 | 2 | 4 | Dania Nour | Palestine | 34.29 | |
| 61 | 3 | 9 | Celina Itatiro | Tanzania | 34.47 | |
| 62 | 1 | 1 | Lidwine Umuhoza Uwase | Rwanda | 34.83 | |
| 63 | 2 | 5 | Laraïba Seibou | Benin | 37.90 | |
| 64 | 1 | 9 | Lina Selo | Ethiopia | 37.98 | |
| 65 | 1 | 2 | Ina Gadama | Malawi | 39.31 | |
| 66 | 1 | 0 | Raaidah Aqeel | Pakistan | 39.92 | |
| 67 | 2 | 1 | Tity Dumbuya | Sierra Leone | 41.18 | |
| 68 | 2 | 8 | Ridaalla Ibrahim | Sudan | 43.48 | |
| | 1 | 3 | Fatoumata Samassékou | Mali | DNS | |
| | 6 | 7 | Jenna Laukkanen | Finland | DNS | |

=== Swim-off ===
The swim-off was held on 13 December at 11:02.

| Rank | Lane | Name | Nationality | Time | Notes |
|---|---|---|---|---|---|
| 1 | 4 | Yukina Hirayama | Japan | 25.74 | Q |
| 2 | 5 | Zhang Yufei | China | 25.98 | |

=== Semifinals ===
The semifinals were held at 19:46.

==== Semifinal 1 ====
| Rank | Lane | Name | Nationality | Time | Notes |
|---|---|---|---|---|---|
| 1 | 5 | Kelsi Dahlia | United States | 24.93 | Q, AM |
| 2 | 4 | Haley Black | Canada | 25.60 | Q |
| 3 | 6 | Aliena Schmidtke | Germany | 25.60 | Q |
| 4 | 1 | Kendyl Stewart | United States | 25.66 | R |
| 5 | 3 | Anastasiya Shkurdai | Belarus | 25.69 | |
| 6 | 2 | Arina Surkova | Russia | 25.74 | |
| 7 | 8 | Hirayama Yukina | Japan | 25.82 | |
| 8 | 7 | Erin Gallagher | South Africa | 26.17 | |

==== Semifinal 2 ====
| Rank | Lane | Name | Nationality | Time | Notes |
|---|---|---|---|---|---|
| 1 | 4 | Ranomi Kromowidjojo | Netherlands | 24.84 | Q |
| 2 | 7 | Holly Barratt | Australia | 24.91 | Q |
| 3 | 6 | Maaike de Waard | Netherlands | 25.17 | Q |
| 4 | 5 | Mélanie Henique | France | 25.24 | Q |
| 5 | 3 | Wang Yichun | China | 25.44 | Q |
| 6 | 2 | Elena di Liddo | Italy | 25.66 | R |
| 7 | 8 | Mimosa Jallow | Finland | 25.71 | |
| 8 | 1 | Daiene Dias | Brazil | 26.05 | |

=== Final ===
The final was held at 19:07.

| Rank | Lane | Name | Nationality | Time | Notes |
|---|---|---|---|---|---|
| 1st place, gold medalist(s) | 4 | Ranomi Kromowidjojo | Netherlands | 24.47 | CR, NR |
| 2nd place, silver medalist(s) | 5 | Holly Barratt | Australia | 24.80 | |
| 3rd place, bronze medalist(s) | 3 | Kelsi Dahlia | United States | 24.97 | |
| 4 | 2 | Mélanie Henique | France | 25.02 | |
| 5 | 6 | Maaike de Waard | Netherlands | 25.32 | |
| 6 | 7 | Wang Yichun | China | 25.38 | |
| 7 | 1 | Haley Black | Canada | 25.75 | |
| 8 | 8 | Aliena Schmidtke | Germany | 25.76 | |
