= Swimming at the 2017 Summer Universiade – Women's 4 × 100 metre medley relay =

Women's 4 × 100 metre medley relay at the 2017 Summer Universiade
- Venue: National Taiwan Sport University Arena
- Location: Taipei, Taiwan
- Dates: 26 August (heats and final)
- Competitors: 72 from 16 nations
- Winning time: 4:00.24

Medalists
gold medal	Anna Konishi; Kanako Watanabe; Yukina Hirayama; Chihiro Igarashi; Reona Aoki; Ayu Iwamoto	Japan
silver medal	Hannah Stevens; Andrea Cottrell; Hellen Moffitt; Caroline Baldwin; Ali DeLoof; Miranda Tucker; Katie McLaughlin; Veronica Burchill	United States
bronze medal	Carlotta Zofkova; Giulia Verona; Elena Di Liddo; Agalia Pezzato	Italy

The Women's 4 × 100 metre medley relay competition at the 2017 Summer Universiade was held on 26 August 2017.

== Records ==
Prior to the competition, the existing world and Universiade records were as follows.

World record	United States	3:51.55	Budapest, Hungary	30 July 2017
Competition record	Russia	3:58.04	Kazan, Russia	16 July 2013

== Results ==
=== Heats ===
The heats were held at 10:00.

Rank	Heat	Lane	Nation	Swimmers	Time	Notes
1	3	4	United States	Ali DeLoof (1:00.39); Miranda Tucker (1:08.60); Katie McLaughlin (59.03); Veronica Burchill (55.61)	4:03.63	Q
2	3	3	Japan	Anna Konishi (1:00.71); Reona Aoki (1:08.31); Yukina Hirayama (59.26); Ayu Iwamoto (56.13)	4:04.41	Q
3	2	3	Australia	Sian Whittaker (1:00.67); Leiston Pickett (1:07.86); Gemma Cooney (1:00.54); Abbey Harkin (56.03)	4:05.10	Q
4	3	5	Italy	Carlotta Zofkova (1:01.53); Giulia Verona (1:10.73); Elena Di Liddo (58.34); Aglaia Pezzato (55.61)	4:06.21	Q
5	2	5	Canada	Alexia Zevnik (1:01.15); Kelsey Wog (1:10.17); Katerine Savard (1:00.37); Jacqueline Keire (55.39)	4:07.08	Q
6	2	6	Poland	Alicja Tchórz (1:01.34); Dominika Sztandera (1:09.76); Klaudia Naziębło (1:00.63); Anna Dowgiert (55.79)	4:07.52	Q
7	2	4	Russia	Polina Lapshina (1:01.36); Maria Temnikova (1:09.87); Anastasia Guzhenkova (1:01.08); Arina Openysheva (56.55)	4:08.86	Q
8	3	6	Germany	Nadine Lämmler (1:02.92); Jessica Steiger (1:08.85); Lisa Graf (1:00.88); Aliena Schmidtke (56.34)	4:08.99	Q
9	3	7	France	Pauline Mahieu (1:02.16); Solène Gallego (1:11.04); Justine Bruno (1:00.72); Assia Touati (55.52)	4:09.44	
10	2	2	South Korea	Ko Su-min (1:03.13); Yang Ji-won (1:10.43); Park Jin-young (1:00.66); Choi Hae-min (56.88)	4:11.10	
11	3	1	Netherlands	Kira Toussaint (1:01.57); Tessa Vermeulen (1:14.81); Kinge Zandringa (59.98); Marieke Tienstra (56.89)	4:13.25	
12	2	7	Hong Kong	Lau Sze Wing Erica (1:07.01); Aisling Haughey (1:10.89); Tam Hoi Lam (1:02.36); Siobhán Haughey (53.53)	4:13.79	
13	2	1	Chinese Taipei	Hsu An (1:03.99); Liao Man-wen (1:10.64); Li Yi-chia (1:04.20); Mo Li-err (57.90)	4:16.73	
14	1	3	China	Xu Lili (1:05.29); Lin Xinlan (1:13.42); Gu Siwen (1:05.46); Wu Tong (1:00.16)	4:24.33	
15	1	4	Chile	Marianne Spuhr (1:08.86); Leila Chanuar (1:16.26); Daniela Reyes (1:07.02); Alejandra Chamorro (1:04.70)	4:36.84	
16	3	8	Philippines	Isabella Olivares (1:08.22); Joy Rodgers (1:18.98); Carmenrose Matabuena (1:13.75); Trisha Oliveros (1:10.75)	4:51.70	
	1	2	Brazil	Daynara de Paula; Pamela Alencar Souza; Daiene Dias; Manuella Lyrio	DNS	
	1	5	Nigeria		DNS	
	1	6	Colombia		DNS	
	3	2	Czech Republic		DNS	

=== Final ===
The final was held at 20:21.

Rank	Lane	Nation	Swimmers	Time	Notes
1st place, gold medalist(s)	5	Japan	Anna Konishi (1:00.93); Kanako Watanabe (1:06.73); Yukina Hirayama (58.26); Chihiro Igarashi (54.32)	4:00.24	
2nd place, silver medalist(s)	4	United States	Hannah Stevens (1:00.97); Andrea Cottrell (1:06.97); Hellen Moffitt (58.46); Caroline Baldwin (54.09)	4:00.49	
3rd place, bronze medalist(s)	6	Italy	Carlotta Zofkova (1:01.37); Giulia Verona (1:08.86); Elena Di Liddo (57.76); Agalia Pezzato (54.41)	4:02.40	
4	3	Australia	Sian Whittaker (1:00.25); Leiston Pickett (1:07.68); Gemma Cooney (59.94); Abbey Harkin (55.71)	4:03.58	
5	2	Canada	Alexia Zevnik (1:01.03); Kelsey Wog (1:08.81); Katerine Savard (59.22); Jacqueline Keire (54.93)	4:03.99	
6	1	Russia	Maria Kameneva (1:00.10); Maria Temnikova (1:08.98); Anastasia Guzhenkova (1:00.03); Arina Openysheva (54.96)	4:04.07	
7	8	Germany	Lisa Graf (1:01.90); Jessica Steiger (1:08.79); Aliena Schmidtke (59.62); Sarah Köhler (55.45)	4:05.76	
8	7	Poland	Alicja Tchórz (1:01.31); Dominika Sztandera (1:09.60); Klaudia Naziębło (59.92); Anna Dowgiert (55.12)	4:05.95	
