= Swimming at the 2017 Summer Universiade – Women's 50 metre butterfly =

Women's 50 metre butterfly at the 2017 Summer Universiade
- Venue: National Taiwan Sport University Arena
- Location: Taipei, Taiwan
- Dates: 20 August (heats and semifinals); 21 August (final)
- Competitors: 56 from 38 nations
- Winning time: 26.16

Medalists
gold medal	Aliena Schmidtke	Germany
silver medal	Elena Di Liddo	Italy
bronze medal	Yukina Hirayama	Japan

The Women's 50 metre butterfly competition at the 2017 Summer Universiade was held on 20 and 21 August 2017.

== Records ==
Prior to the competition, the existing world and Universiade records were as follows.

World record	Sarah Sjöström (SWE)	24.43	Borås, Sweden	5 July 2014
Competition record	Lu Ying (CHN)	25.72	Gwangju, South Korea	5 July 2015

== Results ==
=== Heats ===
The heats were held on 20 August at 9:30.

Rank	Heat	Lane	Name	Nationality	Time	Notes
1	7	4	Aliena Schmidtke	Germany	26.29	Q
2	8	5	Katerine Savard	Canada	26.39	Q
3	6	7	Kaho Okano	Japan	26.71	Q
4	8	4	Anna Dowgiert	Poland	26.75	Q
5	6	6	Kinge Zandringa	Netherlands	26.78	Q
5	7	3	Bruna Lemos Rocha	Brazil	26.78	Q
7	8	6	Yukina Hirayama	Japan	26.84	Q
8	7	5	Rachael Kelly	Great Britain	26.85	Q
9	6	5	Daynara de Paula	Brazil	26.91	Q
10	8	3	Elena Di Liddo	Italy	26.96	Q
11	6	1	Kathryn McLaughlin	United States	26.97	Q
12	6	4	Hellen Moffitt	United States	27.00	Q
13	6	3	Maria Kameneva	Russia	27.21	Q
14	6	2	Nastassia Karakouskaya	Belarus	27.31	Q
15	8	2	Emily Washer	Australia	27.39	Q
16	8	7	Aglaia Pezzato	Italy	27.41	Q, WD
17	7	7	Anna Hopkin	Great Britain	27.43	Q, WD
18	5	5	Evelyn Verrasztó	Hungary	27.45	Q
19	6	8	Elmira Ibraim	Kazakhstan	27.59	
20	7	6	Jessica Steiger	Germany	27.60	
20	7	2	Chan Kin Lok	Hong Kong	27.60	
22	8	8	Nea Norismaa	Finland	27.63	
23	7	8	Gemma Cooney	Australia	27.68	
24	5	6	Emma Chelius	South Africa	27.81	
25	5	4	Hwang Seo-jin	South Korea	27.84	
26	8	1	María Belén Díaz	Argentina	27.93	
27	5	8	Tam Hoi Lam	Hong Kong	27.96	
28	4	7	Lin Xinlan	China	28.03	
29	7	1	Szimonetta Galamb	Hungary	28.05	
30	5	2	Silvia Lászlová	Slovakia	28.13	
31	5	3	Park Jin-young	South Korea	28.37	
32	5	7	Fanny Teijonsalo	Finland	28.40	
33	5	1	Ana Catarina Monteiro	Portugal	28.42	
34	4	6	Maria Paola Muñoz	Colombia	28.83	
35	4	5	Amira Pilgrim	Trinidad and Tobago	28.92	
36	4	2	Song Yutong	China	29.11	
37	4	3	Nida Eliz Üstündağ	Turkey	29.47	
38	3	6	Emily Visagie	South Africa	29.70	
39	3	7	Daniela Reyes Hinrichsen	Chile	29.79	
39	3	4	María Quintero Sosa	Colombia	29.79	
41	3	5	Tan Chi Yan	Macau	30.02	
42	4	1	Karen Riveros	Paraguay	30.06	
43	4	4	Karleen Kersa	Estonia	30.20	
44	3	3	Mariya Liver	Ukraine	30.42	
45	4	8	Jennifer Rizkallah	Lebanon	30.50	
46	3	2	Ho Yan Lum Deborah	Singapore	30.56	
47	3	1	Ana Euceda Gutierrez	Honduras	30.95	
48	2	4	Stefanía Piccardo Uriarte	Paraguay	31.12	
49	3	5	Alejandra Chamorro	Chile	31.19	
50	2	5	Avice Meya	Uganda	31.28	
51	1	5	Jannat Bique	Mozambique	31.55	
52	2	3	Carolina Cazot	Uruguay	31.93	
53	2	7	Gretel-Marie Siimar	Estonia	32.67	
54	2	2	Alic Dela Cruz	Philippines	34.97	
55	1	4	Madhawee Kaluarachchilage Don	Sri Lanka	36.27	
56	1	3	Alliah Saliendra	Philippines	38.05	
	2	1	Sarah Fearnot	Nigeria	DNS	
	2	6	Doutimi Okoko Gaebe	Nigeria	DNS	

=== Semifinals ===
The semifinals were held on 20 August at 19:10.

==== Semifinal 1 ====
Rank	Lane	Name	Nationality	Time	Notes
1	4	Katerine Savard	Canada	26.36	Q
2	5	Anna Dowgiert	Poland	26.40	Q
3	7	Hellen Moffitt	United States	26.66	Q
4	6	Rachael Kelly	Great Britain	26.71	Q
5	2	Elena Di Liddo	Italy	26.74	Q
6	3	Bruna Lemos Rocha	Brazil	26.92	
7	1	Nastassia Karakouskaya	Belarus	27.35	
7	8	Evelyn Verrasztó	Hungary	27.35	

==== Semifinal 2 ====
Rank	Lane	Name	Nationality	Time	Notes
1	4	Aliena Schmidtke	Germany	26.07	Q
2	5	Yukina Hirayama	Japan	26.66	Q
3	6	Kathryn McLaughlin	United States	26.78	Q
4	2	Daynara de Paula	Brazil	26.81	
5	3	Kinge Zandringa	Netherlands	26.83	
6	7	Kaho Okano	Japan	26.96	
6	1	Maria Kameneva	Russia	26.96	
8	8	Emily Washer	Australia	27.39	

=== Final ===
The final was held on 21 August at 19:29.

Rank	Lane	Name	Nationality	Time	Notes
1st place, gold medalist(s)	4	Aliena Schmidtke	Germany	26.16	
2nd place, silver medalist(s)	1	Elena Di Liddo	Italy	26.50	
3rd place, bronze medalist(s)	6	Yukina Hirayama	Japan	26.51	
4	7	Rachael Kelly	Great Britain	26.53	
5	3	Anna Dowgiert	Poland	26.63	
6	2	Hellen Moffitt	United States	26.69	
7	5	Katerine Savard	Canada	26.70	
8	8	Kathryn McLaughlin	United States	26.91	
