= Lexington, Ohio =

- Village
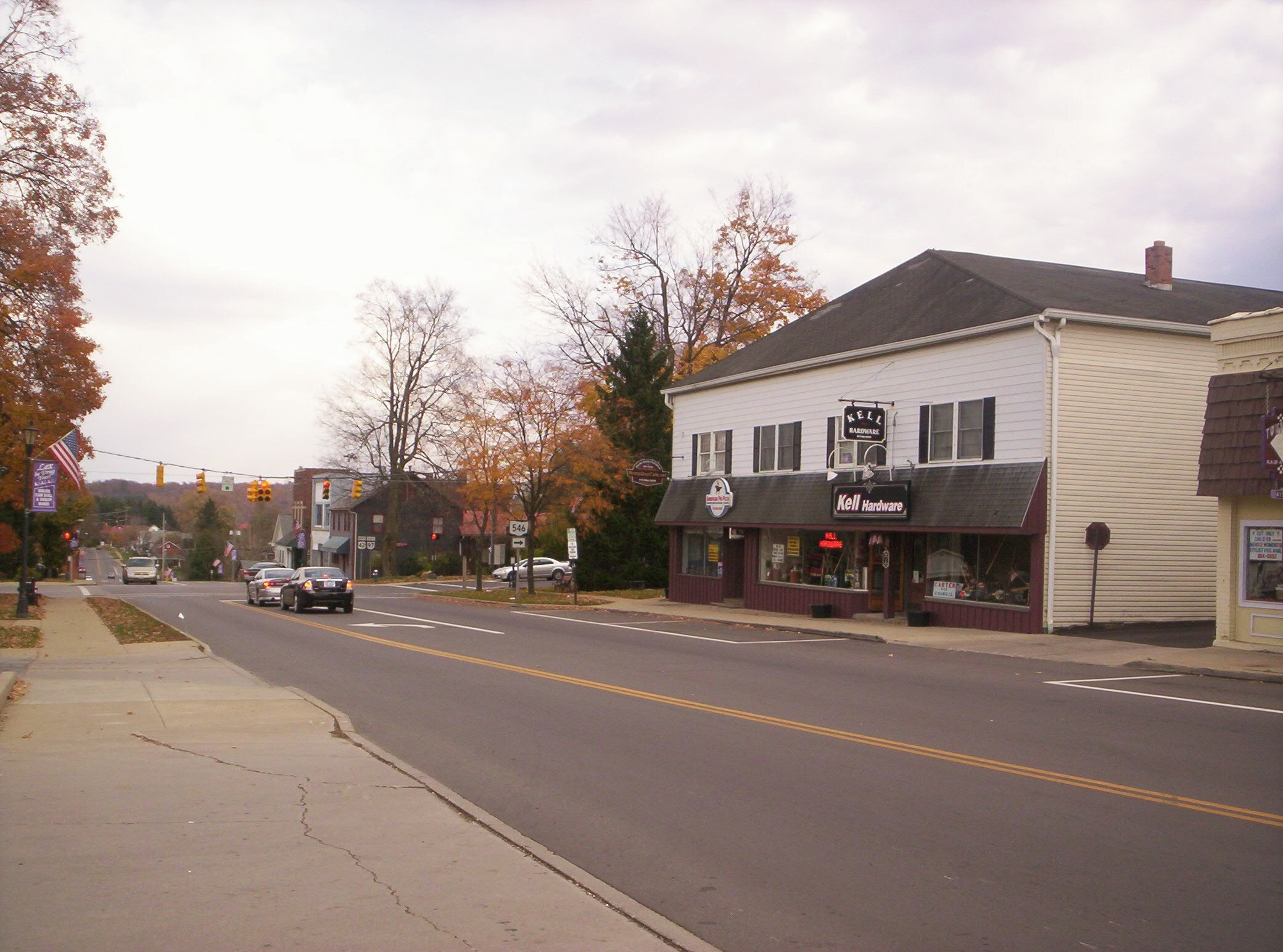
- West Main Street in downtown Lexington in 2007

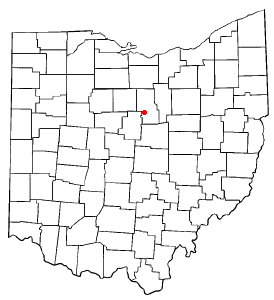
- Location of Lexington, Ohio

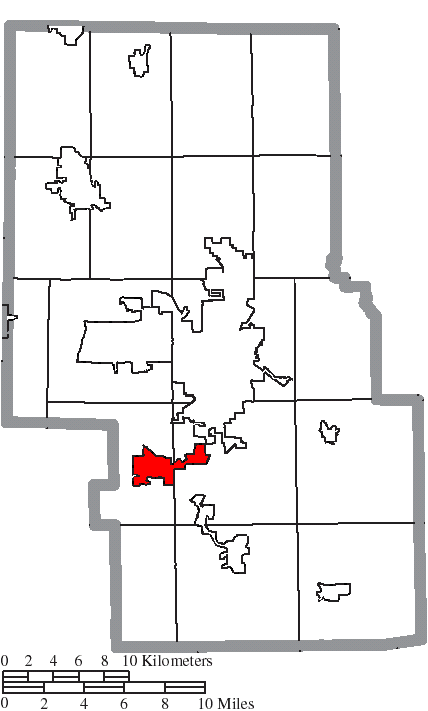
- Location of Lexington in Richland County
- Coordinates: 40°40′46″N 82°34′43″W
- Country: United States
- State: Ohio
- County: Richland
- Township: Troy and Washington
- Founded: 1812

Government
  - Mayor: Bob Jarvis

Area
  - Total: 4.08 sq mi (10.56 km^{2})
  - Land: 4.07 sq mi (10.55 km^{2})
  - Water: 0.0039 sq mi (0.01 km^{2})
- Elevation: 1,184 ft (361 m)

Population (2020)
  - Total: 4,848
  - Density: 1,190.7/sq mi (459.72/km^{2})
- Time zone: UTC-5 (Eastern (EST))
  - Summer (DST): UTC-4 (EDT)
- ZIP code: 44904
- Area code: 419/567
- FIPS code: 39-42994
- GNIS feature ID: 2398431
- Website: https://lexingtonohio.us/

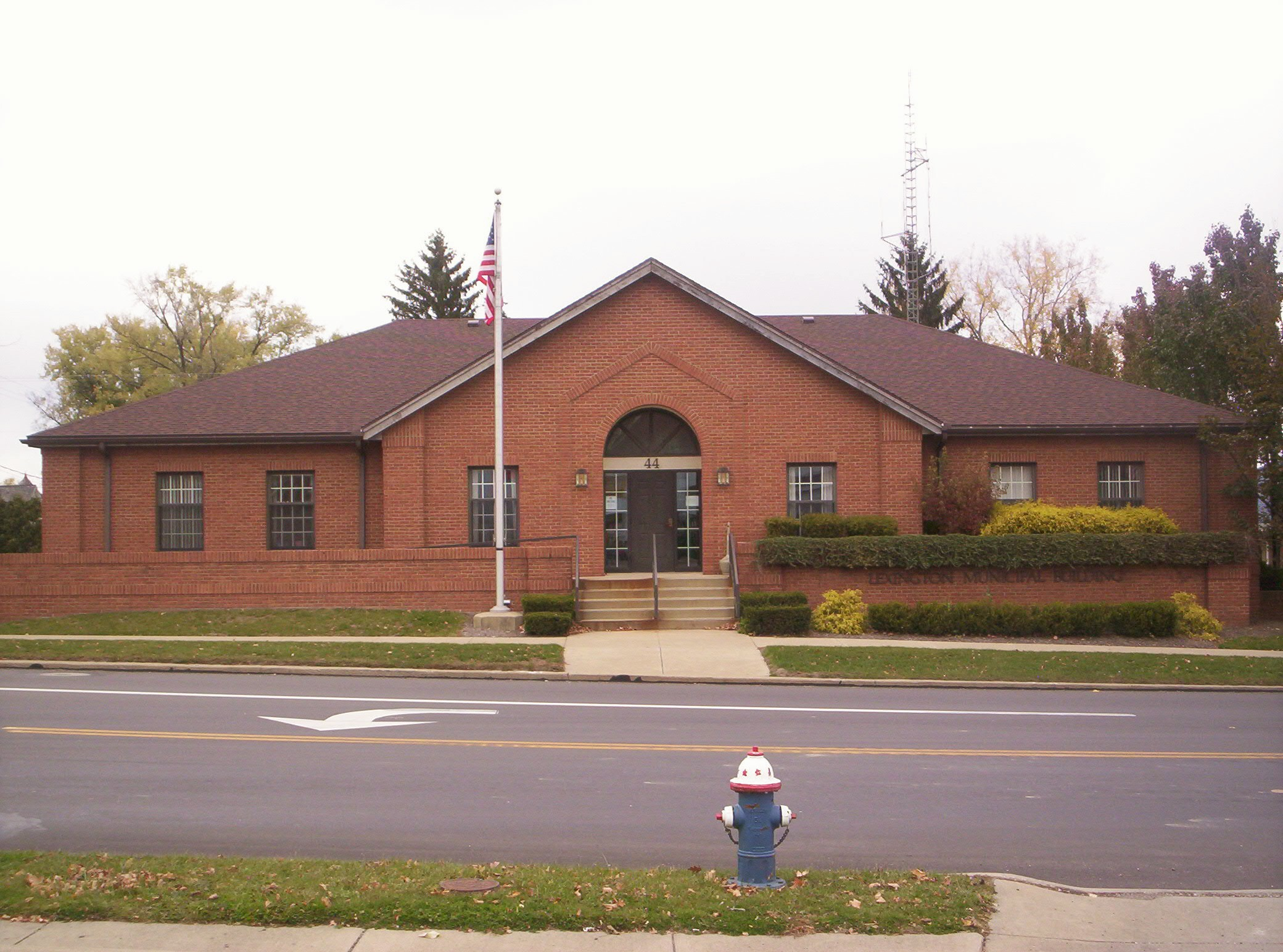
Lexington Municipal Building

Lexington is a village along the Clear Fork River in Troy Township and Washington Township in Richland County in the U.S. state of Ohio. It is part of the Mansfield metropolitan area. The population was 4,848 at the 2020 census.

The Mid-Ohio Sports Car Course is located just outside Lexington in Troy Township. This venue hosted an annual round of the CART series from 1990 to 2003, has hosted the IndyCar Series since 2007, previously hosted the NASCAR Xfinity Series, hosts Honda Super Bikes, and Vintage Bikes in addition to a few other annual high-profile events.

== History ==
Lexington was founded by Amariah Watson Jr. in 1812, a land speculator who had purchased wide lands locally in order to sell to other settlers. During the 1800s, Lexington had many taverns, hotels, and grist mills—most of which at one time or another burned to the ground. In the 19th century, leading members of the community were William Cockley Thad and Martin Kell, Les Griebling, Erwin Castor, Sgt. Patrick Gass, and Jacob Cook. The first road constructed through town was what is now State Route 97, and the second was what is now Lexington-Ontario Road.

Lexington was first inhabited by the Delaware, Wyandot and Mohawk Indians. These tribes inhabited long houses in permanent villages and cultivated crops such as corn, beans, and squash to complement their diet of hunted meat and foraged berries and herbs. The Indians were friendly with Watson when he and his family moved into the area until Watson's pig ate their baby. The Indians demanded Watson's newborn daughter, who was the first white child born in Lexington, as replacement to their own. Watson settled the argument by agreeing to give the Indians the pig instead. Watson chose to name his new home Lexington. He chose this out of respect for his father who fought in the Revolutionary War of which the first battle was fought in Lexington, Massachusetts. In 1813, Watson built a water-powered sawmill along the Clear Fork River. The mill made work easier and attracted more and more settlers. Business owners used the gristmills for their woolen and saw mills and also distilleries.

The first tavern was built in 1815 by Jacob Cook. It was called "Cook's Tavern" and the first grocery store was built in 1825 by William Damsell. It was in 1839 that Lexington was recognized as a village by the federal government. In 1850 the railroad made its path through Lexington and this contributed to much of the business activity and travel for the settlers. Also by 1850 Lexington was booming and anyone could get anything they needed from Lexington and its resources. By 1853 there were over 50 established businesses in Lexington, many of which competed with each other, providing superior products and services to their customers.

The cemetery is on land originally owned by Amariah Watson himself. It wasn't until 1857 that the village fenced it in to allow a more safe resting place. The sexton house was built in 1863 and the row of maple trees was later planted in 1889. The Lexington Square was once decorated with a Civil War Gatling gun. In 1958 the village of Lexington donated the gun to the Smithsonian Institution in Washington, D.C., and it can still be found there today.

A structure still standing in Lexington from 1843 is known as the "Old Stone House". It was built by James Gass and was host to many runaway slaves traveling along the Underground Railroad. The owners today believe that slaves were hidden in a secret closet. Benjamin Gass took 11-12 slaves in a wagon to Springfield Township and those slaves eventually made their way to Canada. A farm on Texter Road owned by Samuel McClure was also part of the underground railroad and George Mitchell hid slaves in his home and water-powered mill, located near the intersection of today's routes 97 and 314. Many more families in Lexington helped and hid slaves making their way to freedom. While there is no list of names there was a protracted court case against certain citizens who were charged with helping slaves.

Harry F. Smith is another figure worthy of taking note in Lexington's history. Smith grew up in Lexington and is responsible for the first outdoor lighting system that was powered by steam in 1894. Smith later founded Smith Gas Power Company which was Lexington's largest business at the time and then he sold it to General Motors in 1918. After retirement Smith was involved in helping create Lexington's water system and became known as the "Father of the Clear Fork Reservoir".

In 2019 long-time council member Brian White unseated longtime incumbent mayor Gene Parkison. In 2023 another long-time council member, Robert "Bob" Jarvis, ran for mayor unopposed and won. He began his 4-year term on January 1, 2024.

== Geography ==
Lexington is located along the Clear Fork of the Mohican River.

According to the United States Census Bureau, the village has a total area of 3.81 square miles (9.87 km^{2}), all land.

== Demographics ==
Historical population
Census	Pop.	Note	%±
1870	482		—
1880	508		5.4%
1890	432		−15.0%
1900	448		3.7%
1910	654		46.0%
1920	634		−3.1%
1930	614		−3.2%
1940	713		16.1%
1950	739		3.6%
1960	1,311		77.4%
1970	2,972		126.7%
1980	3,823		28.6%
1990	4,124		7.9%
2000	4,165		1.0%
2010	4,822		15.8%
2020	4,848		0.5%

=== 2020 census ===
As of the 2020 census, Lexington had a population of 4,848. The median age was 40.6 years. 23.8% of residents were under the age of 18 and 20.8% of residents were 65 years of age or older. For every 100 females there were 89.7 males, and for every 100 females age 18 and over there were 87.6 males age 18 and over.

95.0% of residents lived in urban areas, while 5.0% lived in rural areas.

There were 2,042 households in Lexington, of which 31.6% had children under the age of 18 living in them. Of all households, 47.7% were married-couple households, 17.0% were households with a male householder and no spouse or partner present, and 29.6% were households with a female householder and no spouse or partner present. About 29.8% of all households were made up of individuals and 13.6% had someone living alone who was 65 years of age or older.

There were 2,134 housing units, of which 4.3% were vacant. The homeowner vacancy rate was 1.6% and the rental vacancy rate was 4.6%.

Racial composition as of the 2020 census
Race	Number	Percent
White	4,460	92.0%
Black or African American	87	1.8%
American Indian and Alaska Native	8	0.2%
Asian	49	1.0%
Native Hawaiian and Other Pacific Islander	4	0.1%
Some other race	23	0.5%
Two or more races	217	4.5%
Hispanic or Latino (of any race)	90	1.9%

=== 2010 census ===
As of the census of 2010, there were 4,822 people, 1,970 households, and 1,366 families living in the village. The population density was 1,265.6 inhabitants per square mile (488.7/km^{2}). There were 2,092 housing units at an average density of 549.1 per square mile (212.0/km^{2}). The racial makeup of the village was 96.3% White, 1.2% African American, 0.2% Native American, 1.0% Asian, 0.1% from other races, and 1.2% from two or more races. Hispanic or Latino of any race were 1.2% of the population.

There were 1,970 households, of which 32.8% had children under the age of 18 living with them, 52.5% were married couples living together, 12.8% had a female householder with no husband present, 4.0% had a male householder with no wife present, and 30.7% were non-families. 26.4% of all households were made up of individuals, and 8.9% had someone living alone who was 65 years of age or older. The average household size was 2.41 and the average family size was 2.91.

The median age in the village was 39.9 years. 25% of residents were under the age of 18; 8.2% were between the ages of 18 and 24; 24% were from 25 to 44; 27.9% were from 45 to 64; and 14.9% were 65 years of age or older. The gender makeup of the village was 47.6% male and 52.4% female.

=== 2000 census ===
As of the census of 2000, there were 4,165 people, 1,626 households, and 1,230 families living in the village. The population density was 1,134.7 inhabitants per square mile (438.1/km^{2}). There were 1,686 housing units at an average density of 459.3 per square mile (177.3/km^{2}). The racial makeup of the village was 97.17% White, 1.20% African American, 0.05% Native American, 0.72% Asian, 0.07% Pacific Islander, 0.43% from other races, and 0.36% from two or more races. Hispanic or Latino of any race were 0.89% of the population.

There were 1,626 households, out of which 38.4% had children under the age of 18 living with them, 61.3% were married couples living together, 11.6% had a female householder with no husband present, and 24.3% were non-families. 21.3% of all households were made up of individuals, and 7.3% had someone living alone who was 65 years of age or older. The average household size was 2.56 and the average family size was 2.98.

In the village, the population was spread out, with 28.1% under the age of 18, 7.3% from 18 to 24, 28.5% from 25 to 44, 25.2% from 45 to 64, and 10.9% who were 65 years of age or older. The median age was 37 years. For every 100 females there were 92.9 males. For every 100 females age 18 and over, there were 87.8 males.

The median income for a household in the village was $48,028, and the median income for a family was $57,313. Males had a median income of $47,857 versus $24,954 for females. The per capita income for the village was $23,800. About 1.5% of families and 2.5% of the population were below the poverty line, including 0.9% of those under age 18 and 7.1% of those age 65 or over.

== Education ==
Lexington Local School District operates

- Central Elementary School
- Eastern Elementary School
- Western Elementary School
- Lexington Junior High School
- Lexington High School.

As of the 2022-2023 school year, the new consolidated High School and Junior High building opened for grades 7-12. The former buildings were subsequently demolished. Future plans call for the demolition of the 3 elementary schools after a brand new, consolidated K-6 grade school is built.

Lexington has a public library, a branch of the Mansfield–Richland County Public Library.

== Notable people ==
- John Peter Altgeld, a governor of Illinois
- Olive San Louie Anderson, scholar and author
- R. C. Chambers (1832–1901),19th-century businessman, and silver mine supervisor
- Creed Brothers, WWE tag team, assigned to Monday Night Raw brand.
- Jamie Feick, player in the NBA
- Candice Millard, writer, journalist
- Hannah Stevens: 2017 United States National Champion swimmer
- Cade Stover, Ohio Mr. Football, 2018 As of 2025, a member of the NFL Houston Texans football team.
