= Lexington High School (Ohio) =

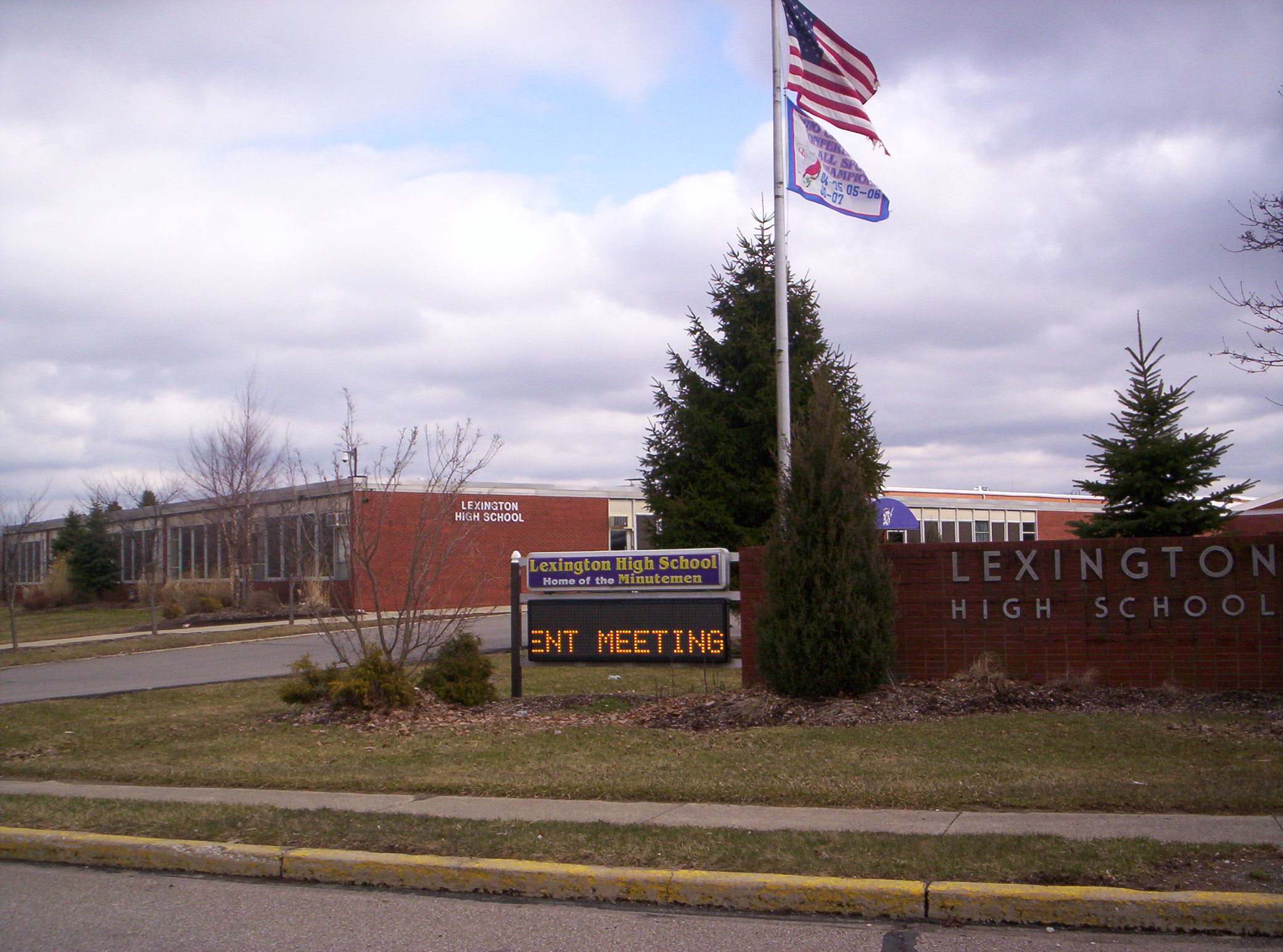
- Lexington High School's former building

Location
- 103 Clever Lane; Lexington, Ohio 44904; United States
- Coordinates: 40.672778°N 82.586667°W

Information
- Type: Public
- School district: Lexington Local School District
- Principal: Jamie Masi
- Staff: 38.57 (FTE)
- Grades: 9–12
- Enrollment: 679 (2023-2024)
- Student to teacher ratio: 17.60
- Colors: Purple and gold
- Athletics conference: Ohio Cardinal Conference
- Nickname: Minutemen
- Website: Lexington Local Schools

Lexington High School is located in Lexington, Ohio, United States. The school serves grades 9-12 and is the only high school in the Lexington Local School District. It has received an "Outstanding" ranking for an outstanding eleven consecutive years by the Ohio Board of Education as a result of standardized test scores. In 2018, a bond issue was passed to replace the previous high school building, consolidating the junior high and high school. It officially opened for the 2022-23 school year.

== School characteristics ==
- Colors: Purple and gold
- Nickname: Minutemen
- Athletic conference: Ohio Cardinal Conference
- Superintendent: Jeremy Secrist
- OHSAA Division II and III athletics

== School Buildings ==
- Central Elementary School (124 Frederick Street)
- Eastern Elementary School (155 Castor Rd)
- Western Elementary School (385 W. Main St)
- Lexington Jr. High School (103 Clever Ln)
- Lexington High School (103 Clever Ln)

=== Former schools ===
- Lexington Jr. High School (90 Frederick St). Demolished in 2022 after a combined High School/Junior High was built. This included the original 3-story "red brick" school constructed in 1894 and had subsequent additions in the 1930s and 1950s. At one time, this building served all 12 grades until 1954.
- Lexington High School (103 Clever Ln). Demolished in 2022 after a combined High School/Junior High was built on the same site behind this building.

== Ohio High School Athletic Association State Championships ==
- Boys' basketball – 1989, 1991
- Girls' cross country - 2015, 2017, 2018, 2019,2020
- Boys' cross country - 2015, 2017, 2025

== Notable alumni ==
- Jamie Feick, retired professional basketball player
- Stacy Dittrich, retired police officer, author & True Crime news show consultant
- David Leslie Johnson-McGoldrick, Hollywood screenwriter and producer
- Drew Kasper, professional wrestler
- Jacob Kasper, professional wrestler
- Sylvia McNair, American opera singer (soprano) and classical recitalist who has also achieved notable success in the Broadway and cabaret genres.
- Hannah Stevens, 2017 United States National Champion, 3x US National Team member, 10th fastest woman in US history in 100M backstroke
- Cade Stover, NFL tight end for the Houston Texans and college football tight end for the Ohio State Buckeyes
