= Swimming at the 2017 Summer Universiade =

Swimming at the XXIX Summer Universiade
- Venues: National Taiwan Sport University Arena; New Taipei City Breeze Canal
- Dates: 20–27 August 2017
- Competitors: 739

Swimming was contested at the 2017 Summer Universiade from August 20 to 27 in Taipei, Taiwan. The swimming competitions were held at the National Taiwan Sport University Arena and the New Taipei City Breeze Canal.

== Medal summary ==
=== Medal table ===
Rank	Nation	Gold	Silver	Bronze	Total
1	United States	11	9	8	28
2	Japan	9	6	5	20
3	Italy	5	4	1	10
4	Russia	2	5	9	16
5	Ukraine	2	3	3	8
6	Germany	2	3	1	6
7	Australia	2	1	0	3
8	Lithuania	2	0	1	3
9	Belarus	2	0	0	2
9	Hong Kong	2	0	0	2
11	Canada	1	1	0	2
12	Hungary	1	0	2	3
13	Finland	1	0	0	1
13	Ireland	1	0	0	1
13	Netherlands	1	0	0	1
16	Poland	0	2	1	3
17	Brazil	0	1	2	3
17	Great Britain	0	1	2	3
19	Bahamas	0	1	1	2
19	Kazakhstan	0	1	1	2
19	Sweden	0	1	1	2
22	South Africa	0	1	0	1
22	Switzerland	0	1	0	1
24	South Korea	0	0	3	3
25	France	0	0	1	1
25	Turkey	0	0	1	1
Totals (26 entries)		44	41	43	128

=== Men's events ===
Event	Gold		Silver		Bronze	
50 m freestyle	Ari-Pekka Liukkonen; Finland	22.02	Ítalo Duarte; Brazil Katsumi Nakamura; Japan	22.05	None awarded	
100 m freestyle	Ryan Held; United States	48.36	Kacper Majchrzak; Poland	48.38	Katsumi Nakamura; Japan	48.63
200 m freestyle	Danas Rapšys; Lithuania	1:45.75 NR	Kacper Majchrzak; Poland	1:46.19 NR	Mikhail Vekovishchev; Russia	1:46.48
400 m freestyle	Mykhailo Romanchuk; Ukraine	3:45.96 UR	Jay Lelliott; Great Britain	3:48.88	Grant Shoults; United States	3:49.03
800 m freestyle	Gregorio Paltrinieri; Italy	7:45.76 UR	Mykhailo Romanchuk; Ukraine	7:46.28	Serhiy Frolov; Ukraine	7:51.06
1500 m freestyle	Gregorio Paltrinieri; Italy	14:47.75 UR	Mykhailo Romanchuk; Ukraine	14:57.51	Gergely Gyurta; Hungary	15:01.11
50 m backstroke	Shane Ryan; Ireland	24.72 NR	Justin Ress; United States	24.73	Won Young-jun; South Korea	25.06
100 m backstroke	Justin Ress; United States	53.29	Kosuke Hagino; Japan	54.12	Danas Rapšys; Lithuania	54.17
200 m backstroke	Danas Rapšys; Lithuania	1:56.52	Austin Katz; United States	1:56.70	Roman Larin; Russia	1:57.29
50 m breaststroke	Ilya Shymanovich; Belarus	27.39	Johannes Skagius; Sweden	27.49	Fabian Schwingenschlögl; Germany	27.63
100 m breaststroke	Ilya Shymanovich; Belarus Andrew Wilson; United States	1:00.15	None awarded		Dmitriy Balandin; Kazakhstan	1:00.17
200 m breaststroke	Andrew Wilson; United States	2:08.45	Dmitriy Balandin; Kazakhstan	2:09.70	Rustam Gadirov; Russia	2:09.72
50 m butterfly	Andriy Hovorov; Ukraine	22.90 UR	Andrey Zhilkin; Russia	23.40	Henrique Martins; Brazil Andrii Khloptsov; Ukraine	23.54
100 m butterfly	Aleksandr Sadovnikov; Russia	51.81	Andrii Khloptsov; Ukraine	51.91	Henrique Martins; Brazil	51.96
200 m butterfly	Nao Horomura; Japan	1:53.90 UR	Daiya Seto; Japan	1:55.09	Bence Biczó; Hungary	1:56.16
200 m individual medley	Kosuke Hagino; Japan	1:57.35 UR	Daiya Seto; Japan	1:58.73	Joe Litchfield; Great Britain	1:59.36
400 m individual medley	Daiya Seto; Japan	4:11.98 UR	Kosuke Hagino; Japan	4:15.44	Aleksandr Osipenko; Russia	4:16.63
4 × 100 m freestyle relay	United States (USA); Maxime Rooney (49.02); Ryan Held (48.25); Justin Ress (48.07); Justin Lynch (48.67); Zach Harting^{[a]} Taylor Dale^{[a]}	3:14.01	Italy (ITA); Lorenzo Zazzeri (48.89); Ivano Vendrame (48.47); Alex Di Giorgio (49.60); Alessandro Miressi (48.28)	3:15.24	Russia (RUS); Mikhail Vekovishchev (49.09); Andrey Arbuzov (49.23); Sergey Fesikov (49.60); Nikita Korolev (48.53); Aleksei Brianskiy^{[a]}	3:15.78
4 × 200 m freestyle relay	Japan (JPN); Katsuhiro Matsumoto (1:47.42); Reo Sakata (1:47.25); Yuki Kobori (1:46.95); Kosuke Hagino (1:46.83); Shuhei Suyama^{[a]} Daiya Seto^{[a]}	7:08.45	United States (USA); Andrea Mitchell D'Arrigo (1:47.89); Maxime Rooney (1:47.36); Grant Shoults (1:48.11); Jonathan Roberts (1:48.83); Grant Sanders^{[a]} Kevin Litherland^{[a]} Austin Katz^{[a]}	7:12.19	Russia (RUS); Viacheslav Andrusenko (1:49.39); Elisei Stepanov (1:48.53); Ernest Maksumov (1:48.74); Mikhail Vekovishchev (1:46.81); Aleksandr Kudashev^{[a]} Aleksandr Fedorov^{[a]}	7:13.47
4 × 100 m medley relay	United States (USA); Justin Ress (53.44); Andrew Wilson (59.29); Justin Lynch (52.70); Ryan Held (47.84); Taylor Dale^{[a]} Jacob Montague^{[a]} Zach Harting^{[a]} Maxime Rooney^{[a]}	3:33.27	Russia (RUS); Roman Larin (54.71); Rustam Gadirov (1:00.24); Aleksandr Sadovnikov (51.49); Mikhail Vekovishchev (48.41); Andrey Shabasov^{[a]} Mikhail Dorinov^{[a]} Aleksandr Kudashev^{[a]} Nikita Korolev^{[a]}	3:34.85	Japan (JPN); Kosuke Hagino (54.23); Mamoru Mori (1:00.51); Yuki Kobori (52.25); Katsumi Nakamura (47.89); Shuhei Uno^{[a]} Ryuya Mura^{[a]} Nao Horomura^{[a]} Katsuhiro Matsumoto^{[a]}	3:34.88
10 km marathon	Gregorio Paltrinieri; Italy	1:54:52.4	Sören Meissner; Germany	1:55:01.5	Krzysztof Pielowski; Poland	1:55:19.6
AF African record | AM Americas record | AS Asian record | ER European record | OC Oceania record | UR Universiade record | WR World record | NR National record

^{a} Swimmers who participated in the heats only and received medals.

=== Women's events ===
Event	Gold		Silver		Bronze	
50 m freestyle	Caroline Baldwin; United States	25.02	Maria Kameneva; Russia	25.08	Katrina Konopka; United States	25.21
100 m freestyle	Siobhán Haughey; Hong Kong	54.10	Maria Kameneva; Russia	54.37	Arina Openysheva; Russia	54.89
200 m freestyle	Siobhán Haughey; Hong Kong	1:56.71 UR	Katie Drabot; United States	1:57.61	Arina Openysheva; Russia	1:58.53
400 m freestyle	Sarah Köhler; Germany	4:03.96 UR, NR	Joanna Evans; Bahamas	4:08.52	Sierra Schmidt; United States	4:09.82
800 m freestyle	Simona Quadarella; Italy	8:20.54 UR	Sarah Köhler; Germany	8:21.67	Joanna Evans; Bahamas	8:31.18 NR
1500 m freestyle	Simona Quadarella; Italy	15:57.90 UR	Sarah Köhler; Germany	15:59.85 NR	Hannah Moore; United States	16:11.68
50 m backstroke	Kira Toussaint; Netherlands Ali DeLoof; United States	28.07	None awarded		Hannah Stevens; United States	28.14
100 m backstroke	Sian Whittaker; Australia	1:00.14	Hannah Stevens; United States	1:00.23	Anna Konishi; Japan	1:00.33
200 m backstroke	Sian Whittaker; Australia	2:09.50	Alexia Zevnik; Canada	2:09.92	Bridgette Alexander; United States	2:10.30
50 m breaststroke	Andrea Cottrell; United States	30.77	Leiston Pickett; Australia	30.82	Jessica Eriksson; Sweden Mariia Liver; Ukraine	31.50
100 m breaststroke	Kanako Watanabe; Japan	1:06.85	Reona Aoki; Japan	1:07.36	Andrea Cottrell; United States	1:07.37
200 m breaststroke	Kanako Watanabe; Japan	2:24.15	Tatjana Schoenmaker; South Africa	2:24.61	Maria Temnikova; Russia	2:24.73
50 m butterfly	Aliena Schmidtke; Germany	26.16	Elena Di Liddo; Italy	26.50	Yukina Hirayama; Japan	26.51
100 m butterfly	Hellen Moffitt; United States	58.75	Elena Di Liddo; Italy	58.81	Rachael Kelly; Great Britain	58.90
200 m butterfly	Ella Eastin; United States	2:08.21	Martina van Berkel; Switzerland	2:11.32	Nida Eliz Üstündağ; Turkey	2:11.40
200 m individual medley	Yui Ohashi; Japan	2:10.03 UR	Ella Eastin; United States	2:11.12	Kim Seo-yeong; South Korea	2:11.62
400 m individual medley	Yui Ohashi; Japan	4:34.40 UR	Allyson McHugh; United States	4:40.22	Kim Seo-yeong; South Korea	4:41.52
4 × 100 m freestyle relay	Canada (CAN); Katerine Savard (54.93); Jacqueline Keire (54.25); Sarah Fournier (55.93); Alexia Zevnik (54.10); Kennedy Goss^{[b]} Kelsey Wog^{[b]}	3:39.21	Russia (RUS); Maria Kameneva (54.79); Polina Lapshina (54.87); Anastasia Guzhenkova (54.98); Arina Openysheva (54.75); Mariya Baklakova^{[b]}	3:39.39	United States (USA); Caroline Baldwin (54.57); Claire Rasmus (55.72); Katrina Konopka (55.61); Veronica Burchill (54.19); Katie Drabot^{[b]} Katie McLaughlin^{[b]}	3:40.09
4 × 200 m freestyle relay	Russia (RUS); Anastasia Guzhenkova (1:58.84); Valeria Salamatina (1:59.00); Mariya Baklakova (1:59.72); Arina Openysheva (1:57.72); Anna Egorova^{[b]}	7:55.28	United States (USA); Claire Rasmus (1:58.85); Katie Drabot (1:58.75); Katie McLaughlin (1:59.11); Ella Eastin (1:58.61); Kaersten Meitz^{[b]} Allyson McHugh^{[b]} Asia Seidt^{[b]} Brooke Forde^{[b]}	7:55.32	Japan (JPN); Chihiro Igarashi (1:59.15); Rika Omoto (2:00.50); Wakaba Tsuyuuchi (2:01.08); Yui Ohashi (1:58.86); Tsuzumi Hasegawa^{[b]}	7:59.59
4 × 100 m medley relay	Japan (JPN); Anna Konishi (1:00.93); Kanako Watanabe (1:06.73); Yukina Hirayama (58.26); Chihiro Igarashi (54.32); Reona Aoki^{[b]} Ayu Iwamoto^{[b]}	4:00.24	United States (USA); Hannah Stevens (1:00.97); Andrea Cottrell (1:06.97); Hellen Moffitt (58.46); Caroline Baldwin (54.09); Ali DeLoof^{[b]} Miranda Tucker^{[b]} Katie McLaughlin^{[b]} Veronica Burchill^{[b]}	4:00.49	Italy (ITA); Carlotta Zofkova (1:01.37); Giulia Verona (1:08.86); Elena Di Liddo (57.76); Agalia Pezzato (54.41)	4:02.40
10 km marathon	Anna Olasz; Hungary	2:04:12.2	Giulia Gabrielleschi; Italy	2:04:17.9	Adeline Furst; France	2:04:23.1
AF African record | AM Americas record | AS Asian record | ER European record | OC Oceania record | UR Universiade record | WR World record | NR National record

^{b} Swimmers who participated in the heats only and received medals.
