= Cade Stover =

American football player (born 2000)

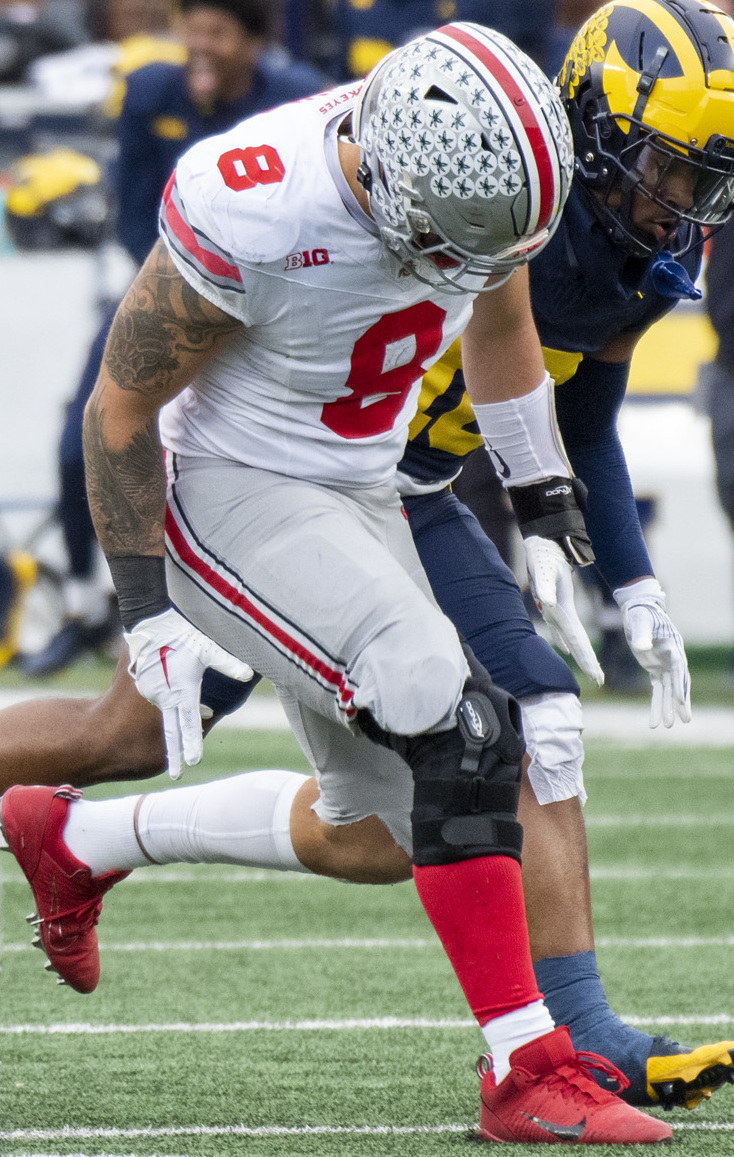
- Stover with the Ohio State Buckeyes in 2023

No. 8 – Houston Texans
- Position: Tight end
- Roster status: Active

Personal information
- Born: June 12, 2000 (age 26); Mansfield, Ohio, U.S.
- Listed height: 6 ft 4 in (1.93 m)
- Listed weight: 251 lb (114 kg)

Career information
- High school: Lexington (Lexington, Ohio)
- College: Ohio State (2019–2023)
- NFL draft: 2024: 4th round, 123rd overall pick

Career history
- Houston Texans (2024–present)

Awards and highlights
- Big Ten Tight End of the Year (2023); First-team All-Big Ten (2023); Third-team All-Big Ten (2022)

Career NFL statistics as of 2025
- Receptions: 27
- Receiving yards: 209
- Receiving touchdowns: 1
- Rushing yards: 3
- Stats at Pro Football Reference

Cade Stover (born June 12, 2000) is an American professional football tight end for the Houston Texans of the National Football League (NFL). He played college football for the Ohio State Buckeyes, and was selected by the Texans in the fourth round of the 2024 NFL draft.

== Early life ==
Stover was born on June 12, 2000, in Mansfield, Ohio, later attending Lexington High School in Lexington, Ohio. He was named Ohio's Mr. Football and the Ohio Gatorade Player of the Year as a senior after rushing for 1,477 yards and 17 touchdowns on offense and recording 163 tackles and four interceptions on defense. Stover also set Lexington's all-time scoring and rebounding records in basketball. He was rated a four-star recruit and committed to play college football at Ohio State over offers from Michigan, Oklahoma, Penn State, Texas, and Wisconsin.

== College career ==
Stover was initially recruited to play linebacker at Ohio State, but was moved to defensive end before the start of his freshman season. He played in four games before redshirting the season. Stover was moved to tight end during spring practice in 2020. He returned to linebacker during the season. Stover was again moved to tight end for his redshirt junior season and caught five passes for 76 yards. He played linebacker in the 2022 Rose Bowl due to a shortage of players at the position. In 2023, Stover was one of the three finalists for the Mackey Award, which is awarded to the nation's best tight end.

== Professional career ==
Pre-draft measurables
Height	Weight	Arm length	Hand span	Wingspan	40-yard dash	10-yard split	20-yard split	20-yard shuttle	Vertical jump	Broad jump
6 ft 3 7/8 in (1.93 m)	247 lb (112 kg)	32 3/4 in (0.83 m)	9 3/4 in (0.25 m)	6 ft 5 1/4 in (1.96 m)	4.65 s	1.59 s	2.72 s	4.45 s	34.5 in (0.88 m)	9 ft 9 in (2.97 m)
All values from NFL Combine

=== 2024 ===
Stover was selected with the 123rd overall pick in the fourth round of the 2024 NFL draft by the Houston Texans. He made 15 appearances (nine starts) during his rookie campaign for Houston, recording 15 receptions for 133 yards and one touchdown.

=== 2025 ===
In Houston's season-opening game against the Los Angeles Rams, Stover recorded four receptions for 22 yards. However, he suffered a broken foot in the contest, and was placed on injured reserve on September 10, 2025. Stover was activated on November 15, ahead of the team's Week 11 matchup against the Tennessee Titans. In Houston's playoff loss to the New England Patriots, Stover suffered a partially torn medial collateral ligament and posterior cruciate ligament; while he didn’t undergo surgery for either injury, he underwent a procedure for a sports hernia early in the offseason.

== NFL career statistics ==
Legend
**Bold**	Career high

=== Regular season ===
Year	Team	Games		Receiving					Rushing					Fumbles	
Year	Team	GP	GS	Rec	Yds	Avg	Lng	TD	Att	Yds	Avg	Lng	TD	Fum	Lost
2024	HOU	15	9	**15**	**133**	**8.9**	**27**	**1**	0	0	0.0	0	0	0	0
2025	HOU	9	7	12	76	6.3	11	0	**4**	**3**	**0.8**	**2**	0	0	0
Career		24	16	27	209	7.7	27	1	4	3	0.8	2	0	0	0

=== Postseason ===
Year	Team	Games		Receiving					Rushing					Fumbles	
Year	Team	GP	GS	Rec	Yds	Avg	Lng	TD	Att	Yds	Avg	Lng	TD	Fum	Lost
2024	HOU	1	0	**4**	**28**	**7.0**	**11**	0	0	0	0.0	0	0	0	0
2025	HOU	2	2	3	15	5.0	8	0	**3**	**10**	**3.3**	**4**	0	0	0
Career		3	2	7	43	6.1	11	0	3	10	3.3	4	0	0	0
