= Swimming at the 2022 Asian Games – Mixed 4 × 100 metre medley relay =

Mixed 4 × 100 metre medley relay at the 2022 Asian Games
- Venue: Hangzhou Olympic Expo Aquatics Center
- Date: 27 September 2023
- Competitors: 78 from 15 nations

Medalists
| gold medal | China; Xu Jiayu, Qin Haiyang, Zhang Yufei, Yang Junxuan, Wang Shun, Yan Zibei, Wang Yichun, Cheng Yujie |
| silver medal | Japan; Ryosuke Irie, Yuya Hinomoto, Ai Soma, Nagisa Ikemoto, Hidekazu Takehara, Ippei Watanabe, Hiroko Makino |
| bronze medal | South Korea; Lee Eun-ji, Choi Dong-yeol, Kim Seo-yeong, Hwang Sun-woo, Lee Ju-ho, Hur Yeon-kyung |

The mixed 4 × 100 metre medley relay event at the 2022 Asian Games took place on 27 September 2023 at the Hangzhou Olympic Expo Center. China won the gold medal in 3:40.38, followed by Japan with silver in 3:43.98 and South Korea with bronze in a national record time of 3:44.12.

== Schedule ==
All times are China Standard Time (UTC+08:00)

| Date | Time | Event |
|---|---|---|
| Wednesday, 27 September 2023 | 11:31 | Heats |
| Wednesday, 27 September 2023 | 20:57 | Final |

== Records ==
Prior to this competition, the existing world, Asian and Games records were as follows.

| World Record | Great Britain | 3:37.58 | Tokyo, Japan | 31 July 2021 |
| Asian Record | China | 3:38.41 | Qingdao, China | 1 October 2020 |
| Games Record | China | 3:40.45 | Jakarta, Indonesia | 22 August 2018 |

== Results ==
=== Heats ===
| Rank | Heat | Team | Time | Notes |
|---|---|---|---|---|
| 1 | 2 | China (CHN) | 3:45.67 | |
| | | Wang Shun | 53.80 | |
| | | Yan Zibei | 59.62 | |
| | | Wang Yichun | 58.16 | |
| | | Cheng Yujie | 54.09 | |
| 2 | 2 | Japan (JPN) | 3:47.94 | |
| | | Hidekazu Takehara | 54.77 | |
| | | Ippei Watanabe | 1:00.28 | |
| | | Hiroko Makino | 58.22 | |
| | | Nagisa Ikemoto | 54.67 | |
| 3 | 1 | South Korea (KOR) | 3:51.03 | |
| | | Lee Ju-ho | 55.10 | |
| | | Choi Dong-yeol | 1:01.08 | |
| | | Kim Seo-yeong | 1:00.10 | |
| | | Hur Yeon-kyung | 54.75 | |
| 4 | 1 | Kazakhstan (KAZ) | 3:52.82 | |
| | | Xeniya Ignatova | 1:02.47 | |
| | | Arsen Kozhakhmetov | 1:01.81 | |
| | | Sofia Spodarenko | 1:00.03 | |
| | | Adilbek Mussin | 48.51 | |
| 5 | 2 | Hong Kong (HKG) | 3:54.20 | |
| | | Cindy Cheung | 1:02.35 | |
| | | Adam Mak | 1:01.76 | |
| | | Yeung Hoi Ching | 1:00.52 | |
| | | Ian Ho | 49.57 | |
| 6 | 1 | Singapore (SGP) | 3:57.01 | |
| | | Zachary Tan | 56.87 | |
| | | Maximillian Ang | 1:01.61 | |
| | | Marina Chan | 1:01.99 | |
| | | Amanda Lim | 56.54 | |
| 7 | 2 | Indonesia (INA) | 4:01.49 | |
| | | Masniari Wolf | 1:05.97 | |
| | | Muhammad Dwiky Raharjo | 1:02.04 | |
| | | Joe Kurniawan | 54.23 | |
| | | Angel Gabriella Yus | 59.25 | |
| 8 | 2 | Chinese Taipei (TPE) | 4:02.71 | |
| | | Wang Hsing-hao | 58.23 | |
| | | Cai Bing-rong | 1:05.07 | |
| | | Hsu An | 1:01.63 | |
| | | Huang Mei-chien | 57.78 | |
| 9 | 1 | Thailand (THA) | 4:04.83 | |
| | | Saovanee Boonamphai | 1:07.72 | |
| | | Thanonchai Janruksa | 1:03.93 | |
| | | Surasit Thongdeang | 54.67 | |
| | | Kornkarnjana Sapianchai | 58.51 | |
| 10 | 1 | Vietnam (VIE) | 4:10.24 | |
| | | Trần Hưng Nguyên | 57.74 | |
| | | Nguyễn Thuý Hiền | 1:15.00 | |
| | | Nguyễn Quang Thuấn | 57.81 | |
| | | Phạm Thị Vân | 59.69 | |
| 11 | 1 | Mongolia (MGL) | 4:11.77 | |
| | | Enkh-Amgalangiin Ariuntamir | 1:07.93 | |
| | | Batbayaryn Enkhtamir | 1:05.08 | |
| | | Khash-Erdeniin Tselmeg | 1:01.79 | |
| | | Batbayaryn Enkhkhüslen | 56.97 | |
| 12 | 1 | Palestine (PLE) | 4:13.18 | |
| | | Yazan Al-Bawwab | 58.85 | |
| | | Marina Abu Shamaleh | 1:15.68 | |
| | | Valerie Tarazi | 1:05.43 | |
| | | Mahmoud Abugharbia | 53.22 | |
| 13 | 2 | Macau (MAC) | 4:17.08 | |
| | | Chan Si Chon | 1:02.95 | |
| | | Choi Ngou Fai | 1:04.69 | |
| | | Kuan I Cheng | 1:09.34 | |
| | | Kuok Hei Cheng | 1:00.10 | |
| 14 | 2 | Pakistan (PAK) | 4:46.07 | |
| | | Fatima Adnan Lotia | 1:20.52 | |
| | | Muhammad Hamza Anwar | 1:20.18 | |
| | | Muhammad Ahmed Durrani | 1:02.96 | |
| | | Jehanara Nabi | 1:02.41 | |
| 15 | 2 | Maldives (MDV) | 4:48.51 | |
| | | Ali Imaan | 1:05.61 | |
| | | Mubal Azzam Ibrahim | 1:15.92 | |
| | | Hanan Hussain Haleem | 1:17.51 | |
| | | Hamna Ahmed | 1:09.47 | |

=== Final ===
| Rank | Team | Time | Notes |
|---|---|---|---|
| 1st place, gold medalist(s) | China (CHN) | 3:37.73 | AR |
| | Xu Jiayu | 51.91 | |
| | Qin Haiyang | 57.25 | |
| | Zhang Yufei | 56.05 | |
| | Yang Junxuan | 52.52 | |
| 2nd place, silver medalist(s) | Japan (JPN) | 3:44.64 | |
| | Ryosuke Irie | 53.64 | |
| | Yuya Hinomoto | 59.50 | |
| | Ai Soma | 57.78 | |
| | Nagisa Ikemoto | 53.72 | |
| 3rd place, bronze medalist(s) | South Korea (KOR) | 3:46.78 | |
| | Lee Eun-ji | 1:01.37 | |
| | Choi Dong-yeol | 59.69 | |
| | Kim Seo-yeong | 57.39 | |
| | Hwang Sun-woo | 48.33 | |
| 4 | Singapore (SGP) | 3:49.73 | |
| | Quah Zheng Wen | 55.26 | |
| | Letitia Sim | 1:06.47 | |
| | Quah Jing Wen | 59.60 | |
| | Jonathan Tan | 48.40 | |
| 5 | Kazakhstan (KAZ) | 3:50.93 | |
| | Xeniya Ignatova | 1:01.78 | |
| | Arsen Kozhakhmetov | 1:01.52 | |
| | Adilbek Mussin | 51.46 | |
| | Sofia Spodarenko | 56.17 | |
| 6 | Hong Kong (HKG) | 3:55.21 | |
| | Cindy Cheung | 1:01.97 | |
| | Benson Wong | 1:01.83 | |
| | Yeung Hoi Ching | 1:00.94 | |
| | Lau Ping Chi | 50.47 | |
| 7 | Chinese Taipei (TPE) | 3:56.69 | |
| | Chuang Mu-lun | 56.53 | |
| | Lin Pei-wun | 1:09.05 | |
| | Wang Kuan-hung | 54.22 | |
| | Hsu An | 56.89 | |
| 8 | Indonesia (INA) | 4:01.50 | |
| | Angel Gabriella Yus | 1:03.90 | |
| | Muhammad Dwiky Raharjo | 1:01.87 | |
| | Joe Kurniawan | 53.80 | |
| | Masniari Wolf | 1:01.93 | |
