= Jamie Feick =

American basketball player (born 1974)

Personal information
- Born: July 3, 1974 (age 52) Lexington, Ohio, U.S.
- Listed height: 6 ft 9 in (2.06 m)
- Listed weight: 255 lb (116 kg)

Career information
- High school: Lexington (Lexington, Ohio)
- College: Michigan State (1992–1996)
- NBA draft: 1996: 2nd round, 48th overall pick
- Drafted by: Philadelphia 76ers
- Playing career: 1996–2001
- Position: Center
- Number: 50, 14, 11, 18

Career history
- 1996–1997: Oklahoma City Cavalry
- 1997: Charlotte Hornets
- 1997: San Antonio Spurs
- 1997: Unicaja Málaga
- 1997–1999: Milwaukee Bucks
- 1999–2003: New Jersey Nets

Career NBA statistics
- Points: 911 (4.5 ppg)
- Rebounds: 1,437 (7.1 rpg)
- Assists: 139 (0.7 apg)
- Stats at NBA.com
- Stats at Basketball Reference

Jamie Feick (born July 3, 1974) is an American former professional basketball player. A 6 ft 9 in (2.06 m) center from Michigan State University, Feick played in the NBA from 1996 to 2001. He played for the Charlotte Hornets, San Antonio Spurs, Milwaukee Bucks and New Jersey Nets. He was selected by the Philadelphia 76ers in the second round (48th pick overall) of the 1996 NBA draft.

== Playing career ==
He won a high school state championship with Lexington High School in 1991.

In his NBA career, Feick played in 201 games and scored a total of 911 points. In the lockout-shortened 1999 season, Feick averaged 11 rebounds per game in 26 games for the New Jersey Nets, and on January 20, 2000, recorded 12 points and 25 rebounds in one game. His last games were in the 2000–01 season, when his career was ended by an Achilles tendon injury. He remained officially on New Jersey's roster until April 2003 despite the Nets attempting to have his contract terminated as early as June 2002.

== NBA career statistics ==
Legend
GP	Games played	GS	Games started	MPG	Minutes per game
FG%	Field goal percentage	3P%	3-point field goal percentage	FT%	Free throw percentage
RPG	Rebounds per game	APG	Assists per game	SPG	Steals per game
BPG	Blocks per game	PPG	Points per game	**Bold**	Career high

=== Regular season ===
Year	Team	GP	GS	MPG	FG%	3P%	FT%	RPG	APG	SPG	BPG	PPG
1996–97	Charlotte	3	0	3.3	.500	**1.000**	.000	1.0	0.0	0.0	0.3	1.7
1996–97	San Antonio	38	0	16.2	.353	.308	.523	5.6	0.7	0.4	0.3	3.8
1997–98	Milwaukee	45	2	10.0	.433	.308	.488	2.8	0.4	0.6	0.4	2.3
1998–99	Milwaukee	2	0	1.5	.000	.000	.000	1.0	0.0	0.0	0.0	0.0
1998–99	New Jersey	26	16	**32.7**	**.504**	.000	**.717**	**11.0**	**0.9**	1.0	**0.7**	**6.8**
1999–00	New Jersey	**81**	**17**	27.7	.428	**1.000**	.707	9.3	0.8	0.5	0.5	5.7
2000–01	New Jersey	6	0	24.8	.348	.000	.500	9.3	0.8	**1.3**	0.5	3.7
Career		201	35	21.5	.424	.400	.629	7.1	0.7	0.6	0.4	4.5

== Other careers ==
In 2008 Feick joined the Walmart FLW bass fishing tournaments tour. In 2009 and 2010 he competed in the majors division, entering seven tournaments and earning $10,500. In late 2010 he left professional fishing to take the job of head basketball coach at Lexington High School in Lexington, Ohio, where he had attended as a student and won two state basketball titles.

Feick is also the co-founder and CEO of Mid-Ohio Tubing LLC, which he co-founded with Wayne Riffe on August 2, 2013.
