= Lexington Local School District =

School district in Ohio

Lexington Local School District is a public school district serving students in the village of Lexington, most of Troy Township, western parts of Washington Township, and southwestern parts of the city of Mansfield in Richland County, Ohio, United States. Also the school district extends into neighboring Morrow County including most of Troy Township, and northeastern parts of North Bloomfield Township. The school district enrolls 2,817 students as of the 2007–2008 academic year.

The District includes a preschool, three elementary schools, one junior high school, and.

== Schools ==
- Lexington High School
- Lexington Junior High School
- Central Elementary
- Eastern Elementary
- Western Elementary
