= Swimming at the 2022 Asian Games – Women's 100 metre butterfly =

Swimming event

Women's 100 metre butterfly at the 2022 Asian Games
- Venue: Hangzhou Olympic Expo Aquatics Center
- Date: 27 September 2023
- Competitors: 25 from 17 nations

Medalists
gold medal	Zhang Yufei	China
silver medal	Ai Soma	Japan
bronze medal	Wang Yichun	China

The Women's 100 metre butterfly event at the 2022 Asian Games took place on 27 September 2023 at the Hangzhou Olympic Expo Center.

== Schedule ==
All times are China Standard Time (UTC+08:00)

Date	Time	Event
Wednesday, 27 September 2023	10:00	Heats
Wednesday, 27 September 2023	19:30	Final

== Records ==
Prior to this competition, the existing world, Asian and Games records were as follows.

World Record	Sarah Sjöström (SWE)	55.48	Rio de Janeiro, Brazil	7 August 2016
Asian Record	Zhang Yufei (CHN)	55.62	Qingdao, China	29 September 2020
Games Record	Rikako Ikee (JPN)	56.30	Jakarta, Indonesia	21 August 2018

== Results ==
=== Heats ===
Rank	Heat	Athlete	Time	Notes
1	4	Zhang Yufei (CHN)	56.20	GR
2	4	Ai Soma (JPN)	57.92	
3	3	Wang Yichun (CHN)	58.09	
4	3	Kim Seo-yeong (KOR)	59.48	
5	2	Quah Jing Wen (SGP)	59.75	
6	4	Natalie Kan (HKG)	59.85	
7	4	Quah Ting Wen (SGP)	1:00.00	Withdrew
8	2	Rikako Ikee (JPN)	1:00.34	
9	3	Sofia Spodarenko (KAZ)	1:00.39	Advanced
10	4	Napatsawan Jaritkla (THA)	1:01.61	
11	3	Hsu An (TPE)	1:01.73	
12	3	Chan Kin Lok (HKG)	1:01.94	
13	2	Jasmine Al-Khaldi (PHI)	1:01.96	
14	2	Nina Venkatesh (IND)	1:03.89	
15	4	Kornkarnjana Sapianchai (THA)	1:04.57	
16	3	Phạm Thị Vân (VIE)	1:04.89	
17	2	Cheang Weng Chi (MAC)	1:06.05	
18	4	Kuan I Cheng (MAC)	1:06.89	
19	2	Ri Hye-gyong (PRK)	1:07.72	
20	4	Ganbaataryn Nomuunaa (MGL)	1:09.56	
21	3	Mira Al-Shehhi (UAE)	1:11.62	
22	1	Gansüldiin Erkhes (MGL)	1:13.17	
23	1	Meral Ayn Latheef (MDV)	1:13.99	
24	3	Hanan Hussain Haleem (MDV)	1:16.18	
25	1	Ameena Ameer Qadri (PAK)	1:17.99	

=== Final ===
Rank	Athlete	Time	Notes
1st place, gold medalist(s)	Zhang Yufei (CHN)	55.86	GR
2nd place, silver medalist(s)	Ai Soma (JPN)	57.57	
3rd place, bronze medalist(s)	Wang Yichun (CHN)	57.83	
4	Kim Seo-young (KOR)	58.18	
5	Rikako Ikee (JPN)	58.98	
6	Natalie Kan (HKG)	59.55	
7	Quah Jing Wen (SGP)	59.60	
8	Sofia Spodarenko (KAZ)	59.73	
