= Haley Black =

Canadian swimmer (born 1996)

Personal information
- Nationality: Canadian
- Born: 8 October 1996 (age 29) Prince George, British Columbia
- Height: 177 cm (5 ft 10 in)
- Weight: 76 kg (168 lb)

Sport
- Sport: Swimming
Medal record
Women's swimming
Representing Canada
Pan American Games
Silver medal – second place	2019 Lima	4×100 m medley

Haley Black (born 8 October 1996) is a Canadian swimmer. She competed in the women's 50 metre butterfly event at the 2018 FINA World Swimming Championships (25 m), in Hangzhou, China.
