= Ai Soma =

Japanese swimmer (born 1997)

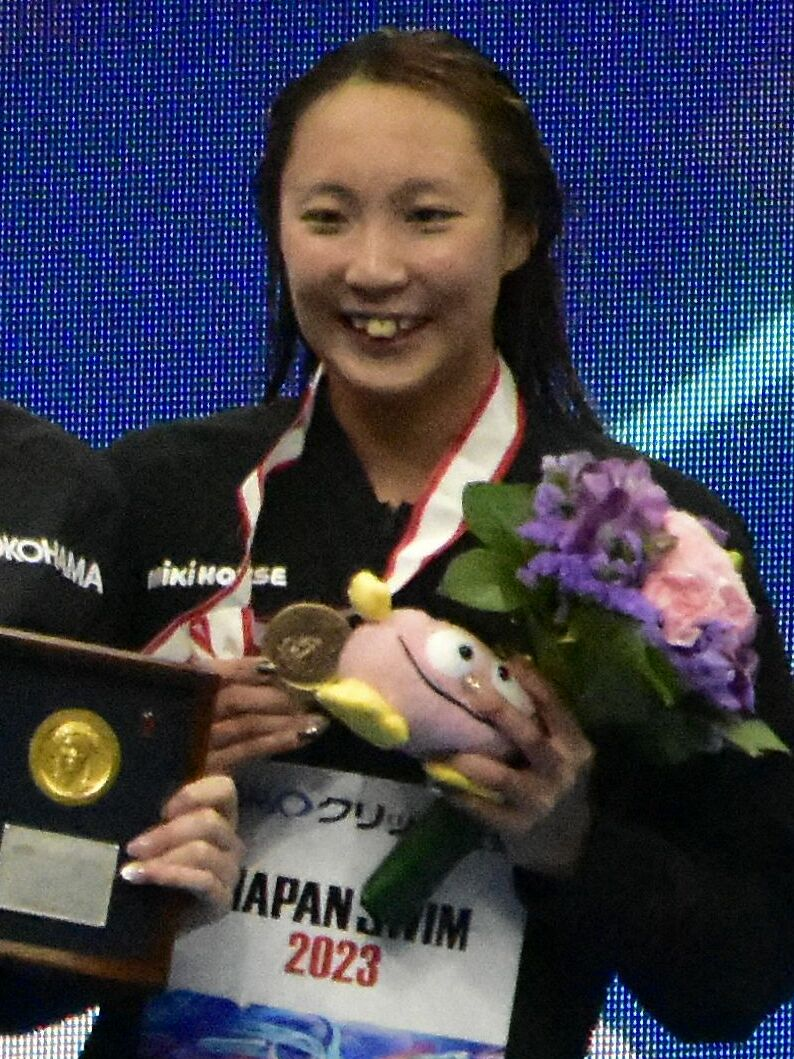

Personal information
- Nationality: Japanese
- Born: 15 September 1997 (age 28)

Sport
- Sport: Swimming
Medal record
Women's swimming
Representing Japan
Universiade
| Silver medal – second place | 2019 Naples | 50 m butterfly |
| Silver medal – second place | 2019 Naples | 4×100 m medley |
Asian Games
| Gold medal – first place | 2018 Jakarta–Palembang | 4×100 m medley |
| Silver medal – second place | 2022 Hangzhou | 100 m butterfly |
| Silver medal – second place | 2022 Hangzhou | mixed 4×100 m medley |

Ai Soma (born 15 September 1997) is a Japanese swimmer. She competed in the women's 50 metre butterfly event at the 2018 FINA World Swimming Championships (25 m), in Hangzhou, China.
