= Nicholle Toh =

Singaporean swimmer

Personal information
- Nationality: Singaporean
- Born: 18 August 2001 (age 25)

Sport
- Sport: Swimming

Nicholle Toh (born 18 August 2001) is a Singaporean swimmer. She competed in the women's 50 metre butterfly event at the 2018 FINA World Swimming Championships (25 m), in Hangzhou, China.
