= Emilie Løvberg =

Norwegian swimmer

Personal information
- Nationality: Norwegian
- Born: 4 July 1995 (age 31)

Sport
- Sport: Swimming

Emilie Løvberg (born 4 July 1995) is a Norwegian swimmer. She competed in the women's 50 metre butterfly event at the 2018 FINA World Swimming Championships (25 m), in Hangzhou, China.
