= Daiene Dias =

Brazilian swimmer (born 1989)

Personal information
- Full name: Daiene Marçal Dias
- Nationality: Brazil
- Born: May 16, 1989 (age 37) Vitória, Espírito Santo, Brazil
- Height: 1.59 m (5 ft 3 in)
- Weight: 51 kg (112 lb)

Sport
- Sport: Swimming
- Strokes: Butterfly
Medal record
Women's swimming
Representing Brazil
World Championships (SC)
Bronze medal – third place	2018 Hangzhou	100 m butterfly
Pan American Games
Bronze medal – third place	2007 Rio de Janeiro	200 m butterfly

Daiene Marçal Dias (born May 16, 1989 in Vitória) is a Brazilian competitive swimmer.

== International career ==
=== 2007–15 ===
Daiene began to swim as a result of medical advice, at age six. She had rhinitis and sinusitis.

At 18 years old, she went to the 2007 Pan American Games, in Rio de Janeiro, where she won the bronze medal in the 200-metre butterfly, beating the Brazilian record, with a time of 2:13.35. He also won bronze in the 4 × 100 m medley however, this result was later revoked due to Rebeca Gusmao's doping. Furthermore, she was in 4th place in the 100-metre butterfly. In the 100-metre butterfly semifinal, Dias broke the South American record, with a time of 1:00.48.

In 2007, she was in a Physical Education University, at a private University in Vitória, where she earned a scholarship.

Integrating national delegation that disputed the 2011 Pan American Games in Guadalajara she finished 10th on the 100-metre butterfly heats, not going to the final.

At the 2014 FINA World Swimming Championships (25 m) in Doha, Qatar, Dias finished 8th in the Women's 100 metre butterfly and 12th in the Women's 50 metre butterfly. Dias also swam the heats of the Women's 4 × 50 metre medley relay, with a time of 1:47.20, South American record.

At the 2015 Pan American Games in Toronto, Ontario, Canada, Dias finished 5th in the 100 metre butterfly.

At the 2015 World Aquatics Championships in Kazan, she finished 9th in the 4 × 100 metre mixed medley relay, along with Felipe Lima, Daynara de Paula and João de Lucca, and 31st in the Women's 100 metre butterfly.

=== 2016 Summer Olympics ===
At the 2016 Summer Olympics, she finished 14th in the Women's 100 metre butterfly.

=== 2016–20 ===
At the 2016 FINA World Swimming Championships (25 m) in Windsor, Ontario, she went to the Women's 100 metre butterfly final, finishing 8th. She also finished 19th in the Women's 50 metre butterfly.

At the 2018 FINA World Swimming Championships (25 m) in Hangzhou, China, at the Women's 100 metre butterfly, Dias broke the South American record in the semifinal, with a time of 56.40, and in the final, she won an unprecedented bronze medal for Brazil in this event, breaking again the South American record with a time of 56.31. It was the first Brazil's women medal in any Olympic event at a World Championships. Minutes later, Etiene Medeiros equaled the achievement by getting the bronze in the 50m freestyle.
