= Elena Di Liddo =

Italian swimmer (born 1993)

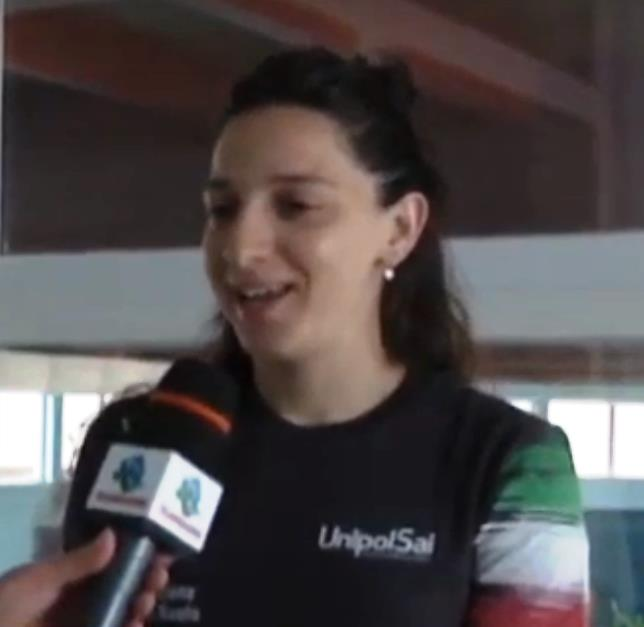

Personal information
- National team: Italy
- Born: 8 September 1993 (age 32) Bisceglie, Italy
- Height: 1.73 m (5 ft 8 in)
- Weight: 66 kg (146 lb)

Sport
- Sport: Swimming
- Strokes: Butterfly
- Club: Circolo Canottieri Aniene
Medal record
Women's swimming
Representing Italy
Event	1st	2nd	3rd
World Championships (SC)	0	0	2
European Championships (LC)	0	0	4
European Championships (SC)	0	2	3
Universiade	1	4	1
Mediterranean Games	3	2	0
Total	4	8	10
World Championships (SC)
Bronze medal – third place	2018 Hangzhou	4×100 m medley
Bronze medal – third place	2021 Abu Dhabi	4×50 m mixed medley
European Championships (LC)
Silver medal – second place	2022 Rome	4×100 m mixed medley
Bronze medal – third place	2018 Glasgow	100 m butterfly
Bronze medal – third place	2018 Glasgow	4×100 m mixed medley
Bronze medal – third place	2020 Budapest	4×100 m mixed medley
Bronze medal – third place	2020 Budapest	4×100 m medley
European Championships (SC)
Silver medal – second place	2019 Glasgow	100 m butterfly
Silver medal – second place	2019 Glasgow	4×50 m medley
Bronze medal – third place	2010 Eindhoven	4×50 m medley
Bronze medal – third place	2011 Szczecin	4×50 m freestyle
Bronze medal – third place	2021 Kazan	4×50 m medley
Summer Universiade
Gold medal – first place	2015 Gwangju	4×100 m medley
Silver medal – second place	2013 Kazan	4×100 m medley
Silver medal – second place	2015 Gwangju	100 m butterfly
Silver medal – second place	2017 Taipei	50 m butterfly
Silver medal – second place	2017 Taipei	100 m butterfly
Bronze medal – third place	2017 Taipei	4×100 m medley
Mediterranean Games
Gold medal – first place	2013 Mersin	4×100 m medley
Gold medal – first place	2018 Tarragona	100 m butterfly
Gold medal – first place	2018 Tarragona	4×100 m medley
Silver medal – second place	2013 Mersin	100 m butterfly
Silver medal – second place	2018 Tarragona	50 m butterfly

Elena di Liddo (born 8 September 1993) is an Italian swimmer. She competed at the 2020 Summer Olympics, in 100 m butterfly.

She won two silver individual medals at the 2017 Summer Universiade. and two with the relay team, in two different editions of the European Short Course Swimming Championships.

== Career ==
Di Liddo won two medals (one individual and one with the relay team) at the 2013 Mediterranean Games. In 2021 she won two bronze medals with the relay team at the Swimming European Championships Hungary 2020.

== Achievements ==
Year	Competition	Venue	Position	Event	Performance	Notes
2017	Summer Universiade	(Taiwan) Taipei	2nd	50 metre butterfly	26.50	
2017	Summer Universiade	(Taiwan) Taipei	2nd	100 metre butterfly	58.81	

== See also ==
- List of Italian records in swimming
