= Hannah Stevens =

American swimmer

Personal information
- Nationality: American
- Born: May 9, 1995 (age 31)
- Height: 5 ft 10.5 in (179.1 cm)

Sport
- Sport: Swimming
- Strokes: Backstroke
- College team: University of Missouri
Medal record
Women's swimming
Representing the United States
Event	1st	2nd	3rd
World University Games	0	2	1
Total	0	2	1
World University Games
Silver medal – second place	2017 Taipei	100 m backstroke
Silver medal – second place	2017 Taipei	4×100 m medley
Bronze medal – third place	2017 Taipei	50 m backstroke

Hannah Stevens (born May 9, 1995) is an American competitive swimmer who specializes in backstroke. She is a member of the U.S. National Team and won the 2017 National Championship in the 50-meter backstroke.

Stevens attends the University of Missouri and is an NCAA All-American.

== College career ==
Stevens attends University of Missouri. At NCAAs her junior year, she finished third in the 100 backstroke. She finished behind Kathleen Baker and Olivia Smoliga.

== International career ==
Stevens was first named to the U.S. National team after the 2015 summer and first raced for Team USA at the 2016 USA College Challenge.

She was named to her first international roster after winning the 50-meter backstroke at the 2017 Phillips 66 National Championships, qualifying for the World Championships in Budapest. She placed ninth in the event at World Championships.

Stevens won the silver medal in the 100-meter backstroke at the 2017 Summer Universiade, her first international medal. She went on to win a silver in the 400 medley relay at the meet, as well as a bronze in the 50 backstroke.

== Personal bests ==
As of August 13, 2016

Long course
Event	Time	Meet	Date	Note(s)
50 m backstroke	27.63	2017 US Championships	July 2017	
100 m backstroke	59.40	Umiz Invite	April 2017	
