= Wang Yichun =

Chinese swimmer (born 2005)

Personal information
- Nationality: Chinese
- Born: 4 April 2005 (age 21) Zibo, Shandong, China
- Height: 177 cm (5 ft 10 in)

Sport
- Sport: Swimming
- Strokes: Butterfly
Medal record
Women's swimming
Representing China
World Championships (LC)
Gold medal – first place	2023 Fukuoka	4×100 m mixed medley
World Championships (SC)
Silver medal – second place	2018 Hangzhou	4×50 m medley
Silver medal – second place	2018 Hangzhou	4×100 m medley
Asian Games
Gold medal – first place	2022 Hangzhou	mixed 4x100m medley
Silver medal – second place	2018 Jakarta	50 m butterfly
Bronze medal – third place	2022 Hangzhou	100 m butterfly

Wang Yichun (王一淳, born 4 April 2005) is a Chinese swimmer. She competed in the women's 50 metre butterfly event at the 2018 Asian Games, winning the silver medal.
