= Yukina Hirayama =

Japanese swimmer

Personal information
- Nationality: Japanese
- Born: 19 December 1995 (age 30)

Sport
- Sport: Swimming
Medal record
Representing Japan
Summer Universiade
Gold medal – first place	2017 Taipei	4x100m medley relay
Bronze medal – third place	2017 Taipei	50m butterfly

Yukina Hirayama (born 19 December 1995) is a Japanese swimmer. She competed in the women's 50 metre butterfly event at the 2018 FINA World Swimming Championships (25 m), in Hangzhou, China.
