= Aliena Schmidtke =

German swimmer (born 1992)

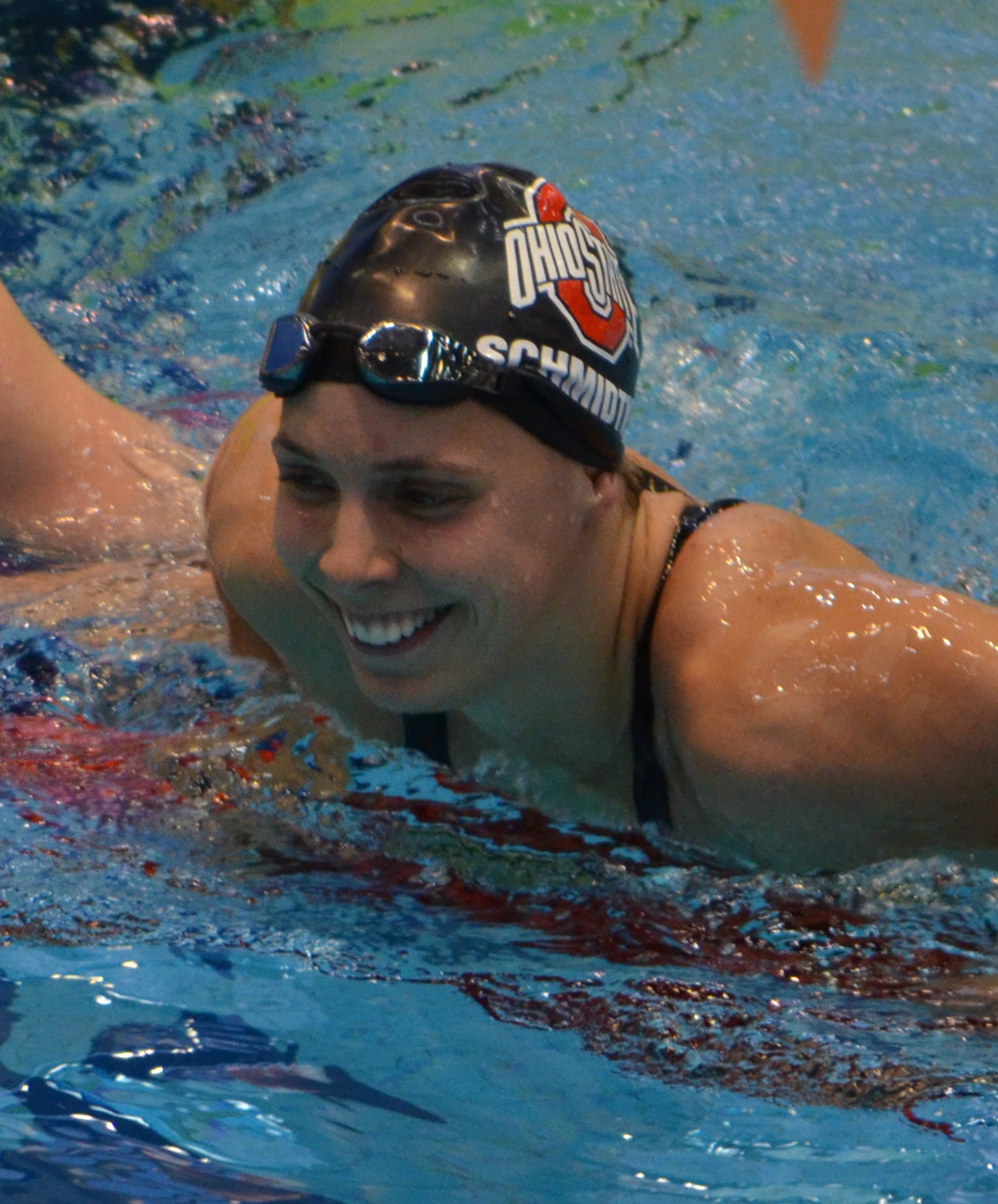
- Schmidtke in February 2019

Personal information
- Born: 20 November 1992 (age 33) Bad Segeberg, Germany

Sport
- Sport: Swimming
Medal record
Representing Germany
Summer Universiade
Gold medal – first place	2017 Taipei	50m butterfly

Aliena Schmidtke (born 20 November 1992) is a German swimmer. She competed in the women's 100 metre butterfly event at the 2017 World Aquatics Championships. She is a member of the German National Team.

== Life and education ==
Schmidtke was born on 20 November 1992 in Bad Segeberg, Germany. She was attended Ohio State University. Schmidtke earned a Bachelor of Science degree in molecular genetics and biology in Ohio State University. Volunteered as a swim instructor with underprivileged children in the Columbus, Ohio area.
