= Ukraine at the 2017 Summer Universiade =

- IOC code: UKR
- NOC: National Olympic Committee of Ukraine
- Website: noc-ukr.org/en/

in Taipei, Taiwan 19 – 30 August 2017
- Competitors: 172 in 14 sports
- Medals Ranked 6th: Gold 12 Silver 11 Bronze 13 Total 36

Summer Universiade appearances (overview)
- 1993; 1995; 1997; 1999; 2001; 2003; 2005; 2007; 2009; 2011; 2013; 2015; 2017; 2019; 2021; 2025; 2027

Ukraine participated at the 2017 Summer Universiade in Taipei, Taiwan. 160 Ukrainian athletes competed in archery, athletics, basketball, diving, fencing, football, gymnastics, judo, swimming, taekwondo, volleyball, weightlifting, and wushu. Ukraine was not represented in badminton, baseball, billiards, golf, roller sports, table tennis, tennis, and water polo. The team won 36 medals, 12 of which were gold, and finished 6th.

== Medal summary ==
=== Medal by sports ===
Medals by sport
Sport	1st place, gold medalist(s)	2nd place, silver medalist(s)	3rd place, bronze medalist(s)	Total
Athletics	3	2	2	7
Swimming	2	3	3	7
Fencing	2	0	2	4
Gymnastics-artistic	1	4	1	6
Gymnastics-rhythmic	1	1	2	4
Diving	1	1	0	2
Taekwondo	1	0	0	1
Weightlifting	1	0	0	1
Judo	0	0	1	1
Volleyball	0	0	1	1
Wushu	0	0	1	1
Total	12	11	13	36

=== Medalists ===
Medal	Name	Sport	Event	Date
Gold	Inna Kashyna	Athletics	Women's 20 kilometres walk	August 26
Gold	Oksana Okunyeva	Athletics	Women's high jump	August 28
Gold	Inna Kashyna; Alina Tsvilii; Valentyna Myronchuk	Athletics	Women's 20 kilometres walk team	August 26
Gold	Oleksandr Gorshkovozov; Anastasiia Nedobiga	Diving	Mixed team	August 27
Gold	Dmytro Chuchukalo	Fencing	Men's individual foil	August 22
Gold	Dzhoan Bezhura; Anfisa Pochkalova; Kseniya Pantelyeyeva; Yuliya Svystil	Fencing	Women's team épée	August 23
Gold	Maryna Makarova; Valeriia Gudym; Daria Sych; Anastasiya Podrushnyak; Alina Bykhno	Gymnastics	Women's rhythmic group all-around	August 28
Gold	Oleg Verniaiev	Gymnastics	Men's artistic individual all-around	August 22
Gold	Mykhailo Romanchuk	Swimming	Men's 400 metre freestyle	August 20
Gold	Andriy Hovorov	Swimming	Men's 50 metre butterfly	August 21
Gold	Iryna Romoldanova	Taekwondo	Women's –46kg (finweight)	
Gold	Iryna Dekha	Weightlifting	Women's 90 kg	August 25
Silver	Olha Lyakhova	Athletics	Women's 800 metres	August 25
Silver	Iryna Herashchenko	Athletics	Women's high jump	August 28
Silver	Stanislav Oliferchyk; Viktoriya Kesar	Diving	Mixed synchronized 3 metre springboard	August 22
Silver	Petro Pakhnyuk; Vladyslav Hryko; Oleg Verniaiev; Yevhen Yudenkov; Ihor Radivilov	Gymnastics	Men's artistic team all-around	August 20
Silver	Oleg Verniaiev	Gymnastics	Men's pommel horse	August 23
Silver	Oleg Verniaiev	Gymnastics	Men's vault	August 23
Silver	Petro Pakhnyuk	Gymnastics	Men's parallel bars	August 23
Silver	Kateryna Lutsenko	Gymnastics	Women's rhythmic individual clubs	August 29
Silver	Mykhailo Romanchuk	Swimming	Men's 800 metre freestyle	August 24
Silver	Mykhailo Romanchuk	Swimming	Men's 1500 metre freestyle	August 22
Silver	Andrii Khloptsov	Swimming	Men's 100 metre butterfly	August 25
Bronze	Igor Glavan; Valeriy Litanyuk; Ivan Banzeruk	Athletics	Men's 20 kilometres walk team	August 26
Bronze	Olena Kolesnichenko	Athletics	Women's 400 metres hurdles	August 25
Bronze	Rostyslav Hertsyk	Fencing	Men's individual foil	August 22
Bronze	Kseniya Pantelyeyeva	Fencing	Women's individual épée	August 20
Bronze	Oleg Verniaiev	Gymnastics	Men's rings	August 23
Bronze	Kateryna Lutsenko	Gymnastics	Women's rhythmic individual hoop	August 29
Bronze	Maryna Makarova; Valeriia Gudym; Daria Sych; Anastasiya Podrushnyak; Alina Bykhno	Gymnastics	Women's rhythmic group 3 balls + 2 ropes	August 29
Bronze	Andrii Kolesnik	Judo	Men's heavyweight +100 kg	August 23
Bronze	Serhiy Frolov	Swimming	Men's 800 metre freestyle	August 24
Bronze	Andrii Khloptsov	Swimming	Men's 50 metre butterfly	August 21
Bronze	Mariia Liver	Swimming	Women's 50 metre breaststroke	
Bronze	Ukraine women's national volleyball team: Kateryna Dudnyk; Maryna Dehtiarova; Daria Drozd; Diana Karpets; Kateryna Silchenkova; Krystyna Niemtseva; Tetiana Yatskiv; Anastasiia Chernukha; Yuliya Boyko; Hanna Kyrychenko; Anna Yefremenko; Olena Napalkova	Volleyball	Women's	August 28
Bronze	Ilona Olkhovyk	Wushu	Women's sanda 60 kg	

== See also ==
- Ukraine at the 2017 Winter Universiade
