= Gymnastics at the 2017 Summer Universiade – Men's artistic team all-around =

Men's artistic team all-around at the XXIX Summer Universiade
- Venue: Taipei Nangang Exhibition Center, Hall 1, 4F
- Dates: 19–20 August
- Competitors: 128 from 36 nations

Medalists
1st place, gold medalist(s)		Kenta Chiba; Tomomasa Hasegawa; Yuya Kamoto; Shogo Nonomura; Wataru Tanigawa	Japan
2nd place, silver medalist(s)		Vladyslav Hryko; Petro Pakhnyuk; Ihor Radivilov; Oleg Verniaiev; Yevgen Yudenkov	Ukraine
3rd place, bronze medalist(s)		Daniil Kazachkov; Ilya Kibartas; Vladislav Poliashov; Kirill Prokopev; Alexey Rostov	Russia

The men's artistic team all-around gymnastics event at the 2017 Summer Universiade from August 19 to 20 at the Taipei Nangang Exhibition Center, Hall 1, 4F in Taipei, Taiwan.

== Final results ==
Qualified for the individual all-around final
Reserve for the individual all-around final

Team	Floor (gymnastics)		Pommel horse		Rings (gymnastics)		Vault (gymnastics)		Parallel bars		Horizontal bar		Total (All-around)	
Team	Score	Rank	Score	Rank	Score	Rank	Score	Rank	Score	Rank	Score	Rank	Score	Rank
Japan	43.550	1	42.650	2	43.150	3	43.300	2	45.850	1	41.725	2	260.225	1st place, gold medalist(s)
Kenta Chiba (JPN)	14.600	5	13.800	12			14.600	7	15.150	2			58.150	65
Tomomasa Hasegawa (JPN)			15.000	2	14.100	19					14.200	2	43.300	87
Yuya Kamoto (JPN)	13.950	11			14.700	7	14.300	14	15.050	5	13.600	20	71.600	41
Shogo Nonomura (JPN)	14.300	7	13.850	10	14.050	20	14.200	19	15.550	1	12.900	47	84.850	4
Wataru Tanigawa (JPN)	14.650	4	13.600	18	14.350	15	14.400	9	15.150	2	13.925	9	86.075	2
Ukraine	42.350	2	43.900	1	44.500	1	43.900	1	43.350	2	39.900	9	257.900	2nd place, silver medalist(s)
Vladyslav Hryko (UKR)	13.600	18	14.350	6	14.050	20			13.600	28	13.200	36	68.800	47
Petro Pakhnyuk (UKR)	12.650	52	14.450	4			14.250	18	15.050	5	12.250	63	68.650	48
Ihor Radivilov (UKR)					15.250	1	14.900	4					30.150	104
Oleg Verniaiev (UKR)	14.900	2	15.100	1	15.100	2	14.750	5	13.750	23	13.550	21	87.150	1
Yevgen Yudenkov (UKR)	13.850	12	13.450	22	14.150	17	13.800	41	14.550	8	13.150	39	82.950	6
Russia	41.800	4	41.050	4	44.150	2	42.350	6	41.000	6	42.800	1	253.150	3rd place, bronze medalist(s)
Daniil Kazachkov (RUS)	14.000	9			14.750	6	14.050	25	12.800	53	13.900	10	69.500	46
Ilya Kibartars (RUS)	13.100	36	13.300	24	14.900	4	14.050	25	13.200	41	14.050	6	82.600	7
Vladislav Poliashov (RUS)			11.150	71					15.000	7	14.550	1	40.700	89
Kirill Prokopev (RUS)	14.700	3	14.200	7	13.600	30	14.200	19					56.700	66
Alexey Rostov (RUS)	13.050	38	13.550	20	14.500	11	14.100	23	12.550	63	14.200	2	81.950	10
South Korea	42.100	3	40.950	5	41.475	6	42.850	4	42.050	4	40.475	6	249.900	4
Im Chang-do (KOR)	13.450	21	13.450	22									26.900	106
Jo Yeong-gwang (KOR)			13.550	20	13.500	33	13.900	34	14.200	12	13.250	33	68.400	50
Kim Han-sol (KOR)	15.000	1	13.950	8	14.150	17	15.150	2	13.550	30	13.100	41	84.900	3
Lee Jung-hyo (KOR)	13.650	16	13.250	27	13.825	24	13.000	73	13.900	21	13.350	27	80.975	14
Yun Jin-seong (KOR)	13.300	27			13.500	22	13.800	41	13.950	20	13.875	12	68.425	49
Chinese Taipei	40.050	6	42.075	3	41.900	5	41.650	11	40.550	9	38.900	12	245.125	5
Chen Jin-ling (TPE)			12.300	48			13.800	41	13.100	46	11.550	75	50.750	81
Hsu Ping-chien (TPE)	12.650	52	14.375	5	13.800	25	13.900	34	12.150	74	12.950	45	79.825	19
Lee Chih-kai (TPE)	13.000	40	14.750	3	13.000	54	12.950	75	14.100	14	13.350	27	81.150	12
Tang Chia-hung (TPE)	14.400	6	12.950	34	13.500	33					12.600	55	53.450	72
Yu Chao-wei (TPE)	12.600	55			14.600	8	13.950	31	13.350	36			54.500	70
France	39.950	8	39.750	7	40.800	8	41.350	12	42.250	3	40.850	4	244.950	6
Kévin Antoniotti (FRA)	13.150	31	12.750	36	12.650	63	13.800	41	14.250	11	12.900	47	79.500	21
Axel Augis (FRA)			13.250	27	13.800	25			14.550	8	14.100	4	55.700	69
Edgar Boulet (FRA)	13.450	31			13.500	33	13.750	48			13.500	23	54.200	71
Killian Mermet (FRA)	12.300	64	12.550	41			13.800	41	12.750	55			51.400	80
Baptiste Miette (FRA)	13.350	25	13.750	13	13.500	33	13.400	58	13.450	34	13.250	33	80.700	15
United States	52.525	7	37.600	10	40.950	7	42.150	7	40.500	10	41.100	3	254.825	7
Levi Anderson (USA)	13.150	31	12.200	51	13.100	52	13.800	41	12.850	50	13.650	17	78.750	24
Alexander Diab (USA)	13.125	35			14.500	11	14.300	14	12.750	55	11.900	71	66.575	53
Tristan Duran (USA)			12.300	48	13.150	49			13.650	25	13.550	21	52.650	73
Vitali Kan (USA)	12.500	58	10.675	80			13.800	41					36.975	97
Robert Neff (USA)	13.750	14	13.100	30	13.300	45	14.050	25	14.000	17	13.900	10	82.100	8
Canada	38.950	8	37.425	12	40.800	8	41.900	9	40.625	8	40.350	7	241.050	8
René Cournoyer (CAN)	13.300	27	12.450	44	14.050	20	13.950	31	14.125	13	13.700	16	81.575.	11
Joel Emile Gagnon (CAN)	13.150	31					14.100	23	13.350	36	11.100	78	51.700	77
Justin August Karstadt (CAN)	12.750	49	13.650	16	13.400	42	13.850	37	11.550	82			65.200	56
Aaron James Mah (CAN)	13.500	20	10.350	82	13.000	54					13.200	36	50.050	82
Samuel Zakutney (CAN)			11.325	68	13.350	44	13.600	54	13.150	43	13.450	24	64.875	57
Kazakhstan	40.275	5	38.300	9	39.250	13	39.775	17	41.625	5	40.100	8	239.325	9
Yerbol Jantykov (KAZ)	13.650	16	12.000	56	12.800	60	13.100	63	14.050	15	13.300	31	78.900	22
Milad Karimi (KAZ)	14.000	9	12.150	52	13.300	54	13.075	68	14.350	10	13.850	13	80.425	16
Vyacheslav Kim (KAZ)					13.450	39			13.225	40	11.950	69	38.625	95
Nurtas Kozhakov (KAZ)	12.625	54	12.450	44			13.600	54	13.150	43	12.950	45	64.775	58
Daulet Nametov (KAZ)	12.450	60	13.700	14	12.300	72	12.950	75					51.400	79
Turkey	39.950	8	32.300	19	42.800	4	41.950	8	40.700	7	39.700	10	237.400	10
Mustafa Area (TUR)	13.150	31	8.950	88	12.150	75	13.100	63	12.750	55	12.550	57	72.650	40
Ferhat Arıcan (TUR)	13.000	40	11.100	74			14.200	19	15.150	2	13.300	31	66.750	52
İbrahim Çolak (TUR)					15.100	2							15.100	117
Ahmet Önder (TUR)	13.800	13	12.250	50	14.000	23	14.350	12	12.800	53	13.850	13	81.050	13
Hamza Şamil Yılmaz (TUR)	9.350	92	8.050	90	13.700	29	13.400	58	12.050	77			56.550	67
Australia	36.900	16	36.500	14	40.050	10	42.650	5	39.050	14	40.600	5	235.750	11
Clay Mason Stephens (AUS)	11.250	84					14.300	14	10.950	87	12.600	55	49.100	83
Michael Mercieca (AUS)	12.450	62	10.600	81	13.500	33	13.500	56	13.200	41	14.050	6	77.300	28
Mitchell Morgans (AUS)	11.850	74	9.700	84	12.800	60	13.850	37	13.650	25	13.950	8	75.800	32
Christopher Ian Remkes (AUS)	12.600	55	13.300	24			14.500	8					40.400	91
Michael John Tone (AUS)			12.600	39	13.750	28			12.200	71			38.550	96
Switzerland	38.625	12	36.800	13	39.250	13	39.900	16	40.450	11	37.450	14	232.475	12
Pascal Marc Bucher (SUI)							13.050	69	12.700	59	13.250	33	39.000	94
Nicola Graber (SUI)	13.425	23	11.900	58	12.900	58	13.000	73	13.050	47	13.150	39	77.425	27
Michael Meiner (SUI)	13.550	19	11.950	57	13.200	48	13.850	37	13.550	30	11.050	79	77.150	30
Jonas Munsch (SUI)														
Marco Walter (SUI)	11.650	78	12.950	34	13.150	49			13.850	22			51.600	78
Hungary	36.050	18	38.600	8	39.400	12	39.750	18	40.100	12	37.900	13	231.800	13
Adam Babos (HUN)	11.450	79	13.650	16	13.150	49	12.600	89	12.850	50			63.700	59
Botond Kardos (HUN)	12.700	50	11.250	70	12.850	59	14.050	25	13.650	25	13.650	17	78.150	26
David Schweigert (HUN)	11.150	85	12.400	46	13.400	42	13.050	69	11.600	81	12.650	53	74.250	37
Dávid Vecsernyés (HUN)	11.900	73	12.550	41			12.650	87	13.600	28	11.600	73	62.300	62
Romania	37.650	14	34.450	16	39.450	11	43.000	3	36.500	19	39.000	11	230.050	14
Robert Gabriel Ghiuzan (ROU)	13.100	36			12.550	65	13.750	48	10.175	93	12.400	59	61.975	63
Adelin Ladislau Kotrong (ROU)	12.250	66	8.600	89			14.300	14			12.750	51	47.900	84
Andrei Muntean (ROU)	12.300	64	11.400	66	14.250	16	14.950	3	13.450	34	13.400	25	79.750	20
Robert Alexandru Pasca (ROU)	12.000	71	11.600	63	12.450	68	12.300	90	12.250	68	12.850	49	73.450	39
Ovidiu Pricjindel (ROU)			11.450	64	12.650	63			10.800	89			34.900	101
Austria	37.200	15	37.450	11	38.950	15	40.150	14	39.350	13	35.025	18	228.125	15
Alexander Benda (AUT)	13.300	27	12.100	53	12.000	76	13.650	52	12.750	55	10.100	83	73.900	38
Xhemi Dyrmishi (AUT)	11.800	76	13.700	14									25.500	110
Vinzenz Höck (AUT)	12.100	69	11.450	64	14.500	11	13.700	51	13.300	38	11.600	73	76.650	31
Matthias Schwab (AUT)			11.650	62	12.450	68	12.800	84	13.300	38	13.325	30	63.525	60
Norway	38.700	11	33.750	18	38.075	16	39.950	15	37.600	15	37.350	15	225.425	16
Pietro Giachino (NOR)	12.950	44	13.050	33	13.250	47	13.050	69	12.900	48	12.100	67	77.300	29
Odin Kalvø (NOR)	12.950	44	11.300	69	12.475	67	13.850	37	12.550	63	12.650	53	75.775	33
Nikolai Rønbeck (NOR)	12.800	47	9.150	87	11.950	78	13.050	69					46.950	86
Henrik Stiansen (NOR)	11.300	83			12.350	71	12.850	82	12.150	74	12.500	58	61.150	64
Vetle Talsnes (NOR)			9.400	86					11.100	86	12.200	66	32.600	103
Finland	36.900	16	35.500	15	36.100	18	41.700	10	37.275	16	34.550	19	222.025	17
Franz Card (FIN)	10.800	90	11.750	61	12.500	66	12.750	85	12.150	74	11.300	77	71.250	43
Elias Jaako Koski (FIN)	12.850	46	12.600	39			12.950	75	12.550	63	12.400	59	63.350	61
Jimi Paeivaenen (FIN)	11.700	77	11.150	71	10.300	80			12.250	68	10.850	80	56.250	68
Heikki Saarenketo (FIN)	12.350	63					14.350	12					26.700	107
Tomi Tuuha (FIN)					13.300	45	14.400	9	12.475	66			40.175	93
Portugal	35.200	19	34.200	17	37.650	17	37.550	19	36.900	18	35.650	17	217.150	18
Bernardo Almeida (POR)	12.050	70	11.050	76	13.450	39	13.100	63	13.150	43	12.300	62	75.100	34
Pedro Guimaraes (POR)	12.000	71	12.050	54	12.200	74	12.950	75	11.900	79	10.500	82	71.600	42
Diogo Romero (POR)	11.150	85	11.100	74	12.000	76	11.500	92	11.850	80	12.850	49	70.450	44
New Zealand	37.750	13	30.050	20	25.650	19	40.800	13	37.250	17	36.800	16	208.300	19
Scott Simon Butler (NZL)	12.800	47			5.650	86	12.850	82			11.450	76	42.750	88
Luke Michael Dobney (NZL)	11.350	81					13.400	58	12.200	71			36.950	98
Devy Alexander Dyson (NZL)			12.700	37	13.800	25			12.700	59	13.000	44	52.200	75
Kyleab Williams Ellis (NZL)	12.700	50	10.300	83	6.200	83	13.750	48	12.350	67	12.350	61	67.650	51
Callum James Phillips (NZL)	12.250	66	7.050	91			13.650	52					32.950	102
Croatia	25.150	20	40.600	6	15.250	20	31.600	20	26.925	20	18.150	20	157.675	20
Matija Baron (CRO)	10.950	87	13.900	9	5.750	85	10.600	93			10.800	81	52.000	76
Renato Prpić (CRO)	3.350	93	13.100	30	3.450	87			4.600	94			24.500	112
Jakov Vlahek (CRO)	10.850	88	13.600	18			10.600	93	10.950	87	6.200	85	52.200	74
Kristijan Vugrinski (CRO)			11.350	67	6.050	84	10.400	95	11.375	83	1.150	86	40.325	92
Uzbekistan	0.000		0.000		0.000		0.000		0.000		0.000		0.000	
Rasuijon Abdurakhimov (UZB)														
Khusniddin Abdusamatov (UZB)														
Abdulla Azimov (UZB)														
Akobir Khamrokulov (UZB)														
Aliyor Rustamov (UZB)														
Individual
Artur Davtyan (ARM)	13.000	40	13.850	10	14.800	5	15.200	1	14.000	17	13.350	27	84.200	5
Tomas Kuzmickas (LTU)	14.150	8	13.150	29	13.100	52	13.950	31	13.975	19	13.750	15	82.075	9
Marios Georgiou (CYP)	12.600	55	13.100	30	13.550	32	12.750	85	14.050	15	14.100	4	80.150	17
Robert Tvorogal (LTU)	13.700	15	12.350	47	12.700	62	13.900	34	13.750	23	13.650	17	80.050	18
Maxime Gentges (BEL)	13.400	24	13.300	24	13.600	30	13.100	63	13.500	33	11.900	75	78.800	23
Ilias Georgiou (CYP)	12.200	68	12.550	41	13.450	39	13.350	61	13.550	30	13.400	25	78.500	25
David Jessen (CZE)	11.350	81	12.050	54	12.950	57	13.450	57	11.950	78	13.175	38	74.925	35
Francisco Javier Rojo (MEX)	13.000	43	11.050	76	11.650	79	14.000	29	12.700	59	12.250	63	74.650	36
Joachim Winther (DEN)	10.850	88	9.650	85	12.300	72	12.950	75	12.200	71	12.250	63	70.200	45
Fabián de Luna (MEX)			11.900	58	14.550	10	14.000	29	12.600	62	12.725	52	65.775	54
Sergejs Pozņakovs (LAT)	11.400	80	10.925	78	7.400	82	12.650	87	11.100	85	12.000	68	65.475	55
Florian Linder (GER)			10.750	79	12.450	68	12.950	75	11.300	84			47.450	85
Audrys Nin Reyes (DOM)							14.700	6	12.850	50	13.050	43	40.600	90
Jim Man Hin (HKG)							14.200	19	12.250	68	9.850	84	36.300	99
Joao Fuglsig (DEN)	11.850	74					12.900	81	10.800	89			35.550	100
Nguyen Tuan Dat (VIE)	13.200	30					14.400	9					27.600	105
Slavomír Michňák (SVK)	13.050	38	12.700	37									25.750	108
Piotr Kielbil (POL)	12.450	60					13.100	63					25.550	109
Bogi Berg (DEN)	12.500	58					12.250	91					24.750	111
Armen Petrosyan (ARM)	10.700	91	11.900	58									22.600	113
Luka Bojanc (SLO)					9.400	81			12.900	48			22.300	114
Sebastian Cecot (POL)									10.250	92	11.950	69	22.200	115
Phan Ngoc Hung (VIE)			11.150	71					10.525	91			21.765	116
Artur Tovmasyan (ARM)					14.600	8							14.600	118
Ng Kiu Chung (HKG)					14.450	14							14.450	119
Luka Terbovšek (SLO)	13.350	25											13.350	120
Shek Wai Hung (HKG)							13.200	62					13.200	121
Jacob Buus (DEN)											13.100	41	13.100	122
