= Gymnastics at the 2017 Summer Universiade – Women's rhythmic group 3 balls + 2 ropes =

Women's rhythmic group 3 balls + 2 ropes at the 2017 Summer Universiade
- Venue: Taipei Nangang Exhibition Center
- Date: 29 August
- Competitors: 40 from 8 nations

Medalists
gold medal	Daria Gorbacheva; Elizaveta Minikhina; Ralina Rakipova; Valeriya Osikova; Vera Biryukova	Russia
silver medal	Hsu Tzu-chi; Ku Ni-chen; Kung Yun; Wang Hsin-lin; Yang Chian-mei	Chinese Taipei
bronze medal	Alina Bykhno; Anastasiya Podrushnyak; Daria Sych; Maryna Makarova; Valeriia Gudym	Ukraine

The Women's 3 balls & 2 ropes gymnastics at the 2017 Summer Universiade in Taipei was held on 29 August at the Taipei Nangang Exhibition Center.

== Schedule ==
All times are Taiwan Standard Time (UTC+08:00).

Date	Time	Event
Tuesday, 29 August 2017	17:30	Final

== Results ==
Rank	Team	Score			Total
Rank	Team	D Score	E Score	Pen.	Total
1st place, gold medalist(s)	Russia (RUS)	9.700	7.800	0.050	17.450
2nd place, silver medalist(s)	Chinese Taipei (TPE)	9.100	6.500		15.600
3rd place, bronze medalist(s)	Ukraine (UKR)	8.900	6.650		15.550
4	Japan (JPN)	8.700	6.800		15.500
5	North Korea (PRK)	8.200	7.000		15.200
6	China (CHN)	8.200	5.950		14.150
7	Hungary (HUN)	8.200	5.250		13.450
8	South Korea (KOR)	5.300	4.700		10.300
