= Gymnastics at the 2017 Summer Universiade – Men's pommel horse =

Men's pommel horse at the 2017 Summer Universiade
- Venue: Taipei Nangang Exhibition Center
- Date: 23 August
- Competitors: 8 from 6 nations

Medalists
gold medal	Lee Chih-kai	Chinese Taipei
silver medal	Oleg Verniaiev	Ukraine
bronze medal	Tomomasa Hasegawa	Japan

The Men's pommel horse Gymnastics at the 2017 Summer Universiade in Taipei was held on 23 August at the Taipei Nangang Exhibition Center.

== Schedule ==
All times are Taiwan Standard Time (UTC+08:00)

Date	Time	Event
Wednesday, 23 August 2017	12:00	Final

== Results ==
Rank	Athlete	Score			Total
Rank	Athlete	D Score	E Score	Pen.	Total
1st place, gold medalist(s)	Lee Chih-kai (TPE)	6.000	9.300		15.300
2nd place, silver medalist(s)	Oleg Verniaiev (UKR)	6.700	8.333		15.033
3rd place, bronze medalist(s)	Tomomasa Hasegawa (JPN)	6.100	8.491		14.591
4	Artur Davtyan (ARM)	5.800	8.733		14.533
5	Petro Pakhnyuk (UKR)	5.900	8.200		14.108
6	Kirill Prokopev (RUS)	6.100	7.966		14.066
7	Hsu Ping-chien (TPE)	5.200	7.800		13.000
8	Matija Baron (CRO)	4.700	6.166		10.866
