= Gymnastics at the 2017 Summer Universiade – Women's rhythmic group all-around =

Women's group all-around at the XXIX Summer Universiade
- Venue: Taipei Nangang Exhibition Center, Hall 1, 4F
- Dates: August 27, 2017 – August 28, 2017
- Competitors: 44 from 8 nations

Medalists
1st place, gold medalist(s)		Alina Bykhno; Anastasiya Podrushnyak; Daria Sych; Maryna Makarova; Valeriia Gudym	Ukraine
2nd place, silver medalist(s)		Chen Pei-an; Hsu Tzu-chi; Ku Ni-chen; Kung Yun; Wang Hsin-lin; Yang Chian-mei	Chinese Taipei
3rd place, bronze medalist(s)		Alexandra Korchagina; Daria Gorbacheva; Elizaveta Minikhina; Ralina Rakipova; Valeriya Osikova; Vera Biryukova	Russia

The women's group all-around gymnastics event at the 2017 Summer Universiade from August 27 to 28 at the Taipei Nangang Exhibition Center, Hall 1, 4F in Taipei, Taiwan.

== Squads ==
Teams	China (CHN)	Chinese Taipei (TPE)	Hungary (HUN)	Japan (JPN)
Members	Fu Pangbo; Liu Siqi; Pan Ruomu; Su Yaoyao; Wen Siyi	Hsu Tzu-chi; Ku Ni-chen; Kung Yun; Yang Chian-mei; Chen Pei-an*; Wang Hsin-lin**	Agnes Vandor; Fibecz Alexandra Györgyi; Janka Szegedi; Laura Dora Ludanyi; Renáta Csomai*; Eszter Szekeres**	Asuka Ono; Ayano Sato; Nanase Hori; Natsumi Morino; Yukari Narimatsu*; Nana Kondo**
Team	North Korea (PRK)	Russia (RUS)	South Korea (KOR)	Ukraine (UKR)
Members	Ham Sue-ae; Kang Jin-a; Mun Kyong-wi; Ri Hye-song; Sin Su-rim	Daria Gorbacheva; Elizaveta Minikhina; Ralina Rakipova; Valeriya Osikova; Alexandra Korchagina*; Vera Biryukova**	Ji Jae-eun; Kim Hee-ryeong; Kim Yeon-jung; Nam Jin-seul; Shin Ju-young	Alina Bykhno; Anastasiya Podrushnyak; Daria Sych; Maryna Makarova; Valeriia Gudym

*:Only participate 5 hoops.
**:Only participate 3 balls & 2 ropes.

== Final results ==
Rank	Team	5		3 & 2		Total (All-around)
Rank	Team	Score	Rank	Score	Rank	Score
1st place, gold medalist(s)	Ukraine (UKR)	17.550	1	16.000	2	33.550
2nd place, silver medalist(s)	Chinese Taipei (TPE)	17.050	2	14.950	4	32.000
3rd place, bronze medalist(s)	Russia (RUS)	15.000	6	16.350	1	31.350
4	North Korea (PRK)	15.800	4	15.100	3	30.900
5	Japan (JPN)	16.400	3	13.300	6	29.700
6	China (CHN)	15.750	5	13.700	5	29.450
7	Hungary (HUN)	12.875	7	12.350	7	25.225
8	South Korea (KOR)	10.050	8	11.575	8	21.625
