= Gymnastics at the 2017 Summer Universiade – Men's parallel bars =

Men's parallel bars at the 2017 Summer Universiade
- Venue: Taipei Nangang Exhibition Center
- Date: 23 August
- Competitors: 8 from 7 nations

Medalists
gold medal	Shogo Nonomura	Japan
silver medal	Petro Pakhnyuk	Ukraine
bronze medal	Wataru Tanigawa	Japan

The Men's parallel bars Gymnastics at the 2017 Summer Universiade in Taipei was held on 23 August at the Taipei Nangang Exhibition Center.

== Schedule ==
All times are Taiwan Standard Time (UTC+08:00)

Date	Time	Event
Wednesday, 23 August 2017	17:00	Final

== Results ==
Rank	Athlete	Score			Total
Rank	Athlete	D Score	E Score	Pen.	Total
1st place, gold medalist(s)	Shogo Nonomura (JPN)	6.400	9.200		15.600
2nd place, silver medalist(s)	Petro Pakhnyuk (UKR)	6.300	9.200		15.500
3rd place, bronze medalist(s)	Wataru Tanigawa (JPN)	6.000	9.200		15.200
4	Axel Augis (FRA)	6.100	9.000		15.100
5	Vladislav Poliashov (RUS)	6.400	8.508		14.908
6	Milad Karimi (KAZ)	5.800	7.800		13.600
7	Ferhat Arıcan (TUR)	5.600	7.700		13.300
8	Yevgen Yudenkov (UKR)	5.500	7.466		12.966
