= Gymnastics at the 2017 Summer Universiade – Men's floor =

Men's floor at the 2017 Summer Universiade
- Venue: Taipei Nangang Exhibition Center
- Date: 23 August
- Competitors: 8 from 6 nations

Medalists
gold medal	Kirill Prokopev	Russia
silver medal	Kim Han-sol	South Korea
bronze medal	Wataru Tanigawa	Japan

The Men's floor Gymnastics at the 2017 Summer Universiade in Taipei was held on 23 August at the Taipei Nangang Exhibition Center.

== Schedule ==
All times are Taiwan Standard Time (UTC+08:00)

Date	Time	Event
Wednesday, 23 August 2017	11:00	Final

== Results ==
Rank	Athlete	Score			Total
Rank	Athlete	D Score	E Score	Pen.	Total
1st place, gold medalist(s)	Kirill Prokopev (RUS)	6.100	8.700		14.800
2nd place, silver medalist(s)	Kim Han-sol (KOR)	6.400	8.300		14.700
3rd place, bronze medalist(s)	Wataru Tanigawa (JPN)	6.000	8.658		14.658
4	Tang Chia-hung (TPE)	6.000	8.700	0.100	14.600
5	Oleg Verniaiev (UKR)	6.100	8.333		14.433
6	Daniil Kazachkov (RUS)	5.300	8.883		14.183
7	Kenta Chiba (JPN)	5.900	8.233		14.133
8	Tomas Kuzmickas (LTU)	5.500	8.466		13.966
