= 2019 World Artistic Gymnastics Championships =

Gymnastics competition

2019 World Artistic Gymnastics Championships

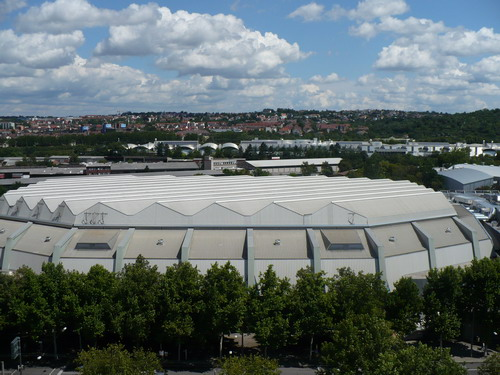
- Venue: Hanns-Martin-Schleyer-Halle (capacity: 14,937)
- Location: Stuttgart, Germany
- Start date: October 4, 2019
- End date: October 13, 2019
- Competitors: 547 from 92 nations

The 2019 World Artistic Gymnastics Championships was held in Stuttgart, Germany from October 4–13, 2019. The championships took place at the Hanns-Martin-Schleyer-Halle, and was the third time the city of Stuttgart hosted the event following the 1989 and 2007 editions, and the fifth time Germany hosted it.

As of October 2, 92 federations registered gymnasts for the event with a total of 288 men and 259 women.

Sam Mikulak of the United States and Mélanie de Jesus dos Santos of France won the Longines Prize for Elegance. Both mark a first for their respective countries: de Jesus dos Santos is the first gymnast from France to win this prize, and Mikulak is the first male gymnast from the United States to win one.

== Competition schedule ==
Listed in local time (UTC+2).

MG – Mixed Group.

Date	Session	Time	Subdivisions
Thursday, October 3	Opening ceremony		
Friday, October 4	Women's Qualification	9:00 AM	WAG: Subdivision 1 MG 24, Ukraine, Australia, MG 13
Friday, October 4	Women's Qualification	11:00 AM	WAG: Subdivision 2 MG 15, MG 23, Czech Republic, Belgium
Friday, October 4	Women's Qualification	1:30 PM	WAG: Subdivision 3 Egypt, Germany, MG 20, MG 2
Friday, October 4	Women's Qualification	3:30 PM	WAG: Subdivision 4 MG 17, MG 8, North Korea, South Korea
Friday, October 4	Women's Qualification	6:00 PM	WAG: Subdivision 5 MG 5, Romania, MG 21, France
Friday, October 4	Women's Qualification	8:00 PM	WAG: Subdivision 6 China, Canada, MG 4, MG 10
Saturday, October 5	Women's Qualification	9:00 AM	WAG: Subdivision 7 MG 12, Great Britain, MG 16, Italy
Saturday, October 5	Women's Qualification	11:00 AM	WAG: Subdivision 8 MG 11, Spain, Netherlands, MG 6
Saturday, October 5	Women's Qualification	1:30 PM	WAG: Subdivision 9 MG 9, Mexico, MG 7, Japan
Saturday, October 5	Women's Qualification	3:30 PM	WAG: Subdivision 10; MG 14, Argentina, Russia, MG 18
Saturday, October 5	Women's Qualification	6:00 PM	WAG: Subdivision 11; MG 22, Hungary, Switzerland, MG 1
Saturday, October 5	Women's Qualification	8:00 PM	WAG: Subdivision 12; Brazil, MG 19, MG 3, United States
Sunday, October 6	Men's Qualification	10:00 AM	MAG: Subdivision 1 Italy, Chinese Taipei, Kazakhstan, MG 21, MG 19, MG 2
Sunday, October 6	Men's Qualification	1:00 PM	MAG: Subdivision 2 Norway, MG 9, MG 7, Hungary, MG 12, France
Sunday, October 6	Men's Qualification	4:30 PM	MAG: Subdivision 3 Russia, Belarus, MG 6, Turkey, MG 4, MG 20
Sunday, October 6	Men's Qualification	7:30 PM	MAG: Subdivision 4 MG 1, MG 13, MG 10, Spain, Germany, Brazil
Monday, October 7	Men's Qualification	10:00 AM	MAG: Subdivision 5 United States, Japan, Canada, MG 14, MG 8, MG 23
Monday, October 7	Men's Qualification	1:00 PM	MAG: Subdivision 6 China, Belgium, MG 5, Finland, MG 17, Australia
Monday, October 7	Men's Qualification	4:30 PM	MAG: Subdivision 7 Ukraine, South Korea, MG 22, Great Britain, MG 18, MG 11
Monday, October 7	Men's Qualification	7:30 PM	MAG: Subdivision 8 Netherlands, MG 16, MG 3, Romania, MG 15, Switzerland
Tuesday, October 8	Women's Team Final	2:30–5:05 PM	Top 8 from qualification
Wednesday, October 9	Men's Team Final	1:45–5:00 PM	Top 8 from qualification
Thursday, October 10	Women's Individual All-Around Final	4:00–6:45 PM	Top 24 from qualification
Friday, October 11	Men's Individual All-Around Final	4:00–7:25 PM	Top 24 from qualification
Saturday, October 12	Apparatus Finals	4:00–7:50 PM	MAG: Floor, Pommel horse, Rings
Saturday, October 12	Apparatus Finals	4:00–7:50 PM	WAG: Vault, Uneven bars
Sunday, October 13	Apparatus Finals	1:00–4:50 PM	MAG: Vault, Parallel bars, Horizontal bar
Sunday, October 13	Apparatus Finals	1:00–4:50 PM	WAG: Balance beam, Floor
Sunday, October 13	Closing ceremony		

== Medal summary ==
=== Medalists ===
Event	Gold	Silver	Bronze
Men
Team	Russia; Denis Ablyazin; David Belyavskiy; Artur Dalaloyan; Nikita Nagornyy; Ivan Stretovich; Vladislav Polyashov	China; Deng Shudi; Lin Chaopan; Sun Wei; Xiao Ruoteng; Zou Jingyuan; You Hao	Japan; Daiki Hashimoto; Yuya Kamoto; Kazuma Kaya; Kakeru Tanigawa; Wataru Tanigawa; Shogo Nonomura
Individual all-around	(Russia) Nikita Nagornyy	(Russia) Artur Dalaloyan	(Ukraine) Oleg Verniaiev
Floor	(Philippines) Carlos Yulo	(Israel) Artem Dolgopyat	(China) Xiao Ruoteng
Pommel horse	(United Kingdom) Max Whitlock	(Chinese Taipei) Lee Chih-kai	(Republic of Ireland) Rhys McClenaghan
Rings	(Turkey) İbrahim Çolak	(Italy) Marco Lodadio	(France) Samir Aït Saïd
Vault	(Russia) Nikita Nagornyy	(Russia) Artur Dalaloyan	(Ukraine) Igor Radivilov
Parallel bars	(United Kingdom) Joe Fraser	(Turkey) Ahmet Önder	(Japan) Kazuma Kaya
Horizontal bar	(Brazil) Arthur Mariano	(Croatia) Tin Srbić	(Russia) Artur Dalaloyan
Women
Team	United States; Simone Biles; Jade Carey; Kara Eaker; Sunisa Lee; Grace McCallum; MyKayla Skinner	Russia; Anastasia Agafonova; Lilia Akhaimova; Angelina Melnikova; Aleksandra Shchekoldina; Daria Spiridonova; Maria Paseka	Italy; Desiree Carofiglio; Alice D'Amato; Asia D'Amato; Elisa Iorio; Giorgia Villa; Martina Maggio
Individual all-around	(United States) Simone Biles	(China) Tang Xijing	(Russia) Angelina Melnikova
Vault	(United States) Simone Biles	(United States) Jade Carey	(United Kingdom) Ellie Downie
Uneven bars	(Belgium) Nina Derwael	(United Kingdom) Becky Downie	(United States) Sunisa Lee
Balance beam	(United States) Simone Biles	(China) Liu Tingting	(China) Li Shijia
Floor	(United States) Simone Biles	(United States) Sunisa Lee	(Russia) Angelina Melnikova

=== Medal standings ===
==== Overall ====
Rank	Nation	Gold	Silver	Bronze	Total
1	United States	5	2	1	8
2	Russia	3	3	3	9
3	Great Britain	2	1	1	4
4	Turkey	1	1	0	2
5	Belgium	1	0	0	1
5	Brazil	1	0	0	1
5	Philippines	1	0	0	1
8	China	0	3	2	5
9	Italy	0	1	1	2
10	Chinese Taipei	0	1	0	1
10	Croatia	0	1	0	1
10	Israel	0	1	0	1
13	Japan	0	0	2	2
13	Ukraine	0	0	2	2
15	France	0	0	1	1
15	Ireland	0	0	1	1
Totals (16 entries)		14	14	14	42

==== Men ====
Rank	Nation	Gold	Silver	Bronze	Total
1	Russia	3	2	1	6
2	Great Britain	2	0	0	2
3	Turkey	1	1	0	2
4	Brazil	1	0	0	1
4	Philippines	1	0	0	1
6	China	0	1	1	2
7	Chinese Taipei	0	1	0	1
7	Croatia	0	1	0	1
7	Israel	0	1	0	1
7	Italy	0	1	0	1
11	Japan	0	0	2	2
11	Ukraine	0	0	2	2
13	France	0	0	1	1
13	Ireland	0	0	1	1
Totals (14 entries)		8	8	8	24

==== Women ====
Rank	Nation	Gold	Silver	Bronze	Total
1	United States	5	2	1	8
2	Belgium	1	0	0	1
3	China	0	2	1	3
4	Russia	0	1	2	3
5	Great Britain	0	1	1	2
6	Italy	0	0	1	1
Totals (6 entries)		6	6	6	18

== Men's results ==
=== Team ===
Russia won their first team gold since the collapse of the Soviet Union. The team event also marks the first time for Chinese Taipei to make the team final and as a result they qualified for the 2020 Olympics in Tokyo.

Rank	Team	Floor (gymnastics)	Pommel horse	Rings (gymnastics)	Vault (gymnastics)	Parallel bars	Horizontal bar	Total
1st place, gold medalist(s)	Russia	43.833 (1)	41.832 (4)	43.732 (1)	44.432 (1)	44.399 (2)	43.498 (1)	261.726
1st place, gold medalist(s)	Denis Ablyazin			14.533				261.726
1st place, gold medalist(s)	David Belyavskiy		14.000			15.133		261.726
1st place, gold medalist(s)	Artur Dalaloyan	14.633		14.666	14.966	13.966	14.366	261.726
1st place, gold medalist(s)	Nikita Nagornyy	14.900	14.166	14.533	15.066	15.300	14.466	261.726
1st place, gold medalist(s)	Ivan Stretovich	14.300	13.666		14.400		14.666	261.726
2nd place, silver medalist(s)	China	43.333 (2)	43.783 (1)	43.366 (3)	43.999 (2)	45.141 (1)	41.107 (5)	260.729
2nd place, silver medalist(s)	Deng Shudi	14.100		14.533	14.866		13.841	260.729
2nd place, silver medalist(s)	Lin Chaopan	14.200				14.658	14.500	260.729
2nd place, silver medalist(s)	Sun Wei		14.200	14.333	14.800		12.766	260.729
2nd place, silver medalist(s)	Xiao Ruoteng	15.033	14.900		14.333	14.100		260.729
2nd place, silver medalist(s)	Zou Jingyuan		14.683	14.500		16.383		260.729
3rd place, bronze medalist(s)	Japan	41.965 (5)	43.399 (2)	43.432 (2)	43.874 (4)	43.332 (4)	42.157 (3)	258.159
3rd place, bronze medalist(s)	Daiki Hashimoto	13.533	14.466		14.900		14.066	258.159
3rd place, bronze medalist(s)	Yuya Kamoto			14.766		14.133	13.866	258.159
3rd place, bronze medalist(s)	Kazuma Kaya	14.366	14.400	14.366	14.141	14.883	14.225	258.159
3rd place, bronze medalist(s)	Kakeru Tanigawa	14.066	14.533			14.366		258.159
3rd place, bronze medalist(s)	Wataru Tanigawa			14.300	14.833			258.159
4	United States	43.332 (3)	40.799 (6)	41.966 (5)	42.700 (5)	43.566 (3)	42.215 (2)	254.578
4	Trevor Howard			13.900				254.578
4	Sam Mikulak	14.666	13.966	14.233	14.200	15.200	14.666	254.578
4	Akash Modi		13.900		14.200	14.266	14.016	254.578
4	Yul Moldauer	14.400	12.933	13.833	14.300	14.100		254.578
4	Shane Wiskus	14.266					13.533	254.578
5	Great Britain	41.866 (6)	41.233 (5)	41.999 (4)	43.899 (3)	42.966 (5)	39.648 (8)	251.611
5	Dominick Cunningham	14.466		13.700	14.400			251.611
5	Joe Fraser		13.800	14.333		14.833	12.666	251.611
5	James Hall	14.200	13.300	13.966	14.666	14.200	13.916	251.611
5	Giarnni Regini-Moran	13.200			14.833	13.933		251.611
5	Max Whitlock		14.133				13.066	251.611
6	Chinese Taipei	41.432 (7)	42.900 (3)	41.365 (6)	41.165 (8)	40.266 (8)	41.533 (4)	248.243
6	Hsu Ping-chien		13.400		13.666		13.033	248.243
6	Lee Chih-kai	14.133	15.000	13.366	14.366	13.733	13.166	248.243
6	Shiao Yu-jan	13.166	14.500					248.243
6	Tang Chia-hung	14.133		13.866	13.133	13.533	14.916	248.243
6	Yu Chao-wei			14.133		13.000		248.243
7	Switzerland	42.666 (4)	39.841 (7)	40.699 (8)	41.666 (7)	42.233 (6)	39.933 (6)	247.038
7	Christian Baumann		12.233	13.633		13.900		247.038
7	Pablo Brägger	14.100			13.100	13.833	13.000	247.038
7	Benjamin Gischard	14.300	13.800	13.200	14.266			247.038
7	Oliver Hegi		13.808		14.300		14.600	247.038
7	Eddy Yusof	14.266		13.866		14.500	12.333	247.038
8	Ukraine	41.265 (8)	39.633 (8)	41.265 (7)	42.299 (6)	42.232 (7)	39.899 (7)	246.593
8	Vladyslav Hryko	13.633	11.800	12.966	13.666	13.800	13.466	246.593
8	Petro Pakhniuk					14.466	13.633	246.593
8	Igor Radivilov	13.666		14.566	14.733			246.593
8	Oleg Verniaiev		14.500					246.593
8	Yevgen Yudenkov	13.966	13.333	13.733	13.900	13.966	12.800	246.593

=== Individual all-around ===
Kim Han-sol of South Korea withdrew and was replaced by first alternate Loris Frasca of France. Cuba's Manrique Larduet also withdrew and was replaced by second alternate Robert Tvorogal of Lithuania.

2018 World champion Artur Dalaloyan and bronze medalist Nikita Nagornyy, both of Russia, returned to the podium for the second consecutive year, winning silver and gold, respectively. Ukraine's Oleg Verniaiev, the 2016 Olympic silver medalist, won his first World medal in the all-around. Defending silver medalist Xiao Ruoteng of China narrowly missed the all-around podium for the first time this quad, finishing behind Verniaiev by less than three tenths.

Rank	Gymnast	Floor (gymnastics)	Pommel horse	Rings (gymnastics)	Vault (gymnastics)	Parallel bars	Horizontal bar	Total
1st place, gold medalist(s)	(Russia) Nikita Nagornyy	15.041	14.566	14.633	15.066	15.300	14.166	88.772
2nd place, silver medalist(s)	(Russia) Artur Dalaloyan	15.200	14.000	14.433	14.066	15.233	14.233	87.165
3rd place, bronze medalist(s)	(Ukraine) Oleg Verniaiev	14.166	14.866	14.000	14.800	15.475	13.666	86.973
4	(China) Xiao Ruoteng	15.025	15.000	13.933	14.800	15.266	12.666	86.690
5	(China) Sun Wei	14.033	14.991	13.966	14.600	14.933	14.000	86.523
6	(Japan) Kazuma Kaya	14.300	14.566	14.300	14.000	15.000	13.733	85.899
7	(United States) Sam Mikulak	14.400	13.000	14.000	14.266	15.325	14.700	85.691
8	(United Kingdom) Joe Fraser	14.166	13.800	13.966	14.266	14.900	14.000	85.098
9	(Ukraine) Petro Pakhniuk	14.033	14.233	13.433	14.566	14.900	13.766	84.931
10	(Philippines) Carlos Yulo	14.633	12.816	13.666	14.600	14.833	13.500	84.048
11	(Chinese Taipei) Tang Chia-hung	14.200	13.100	13.600	14.283	13.933	14.700	83.816
12	(Chinese Taipei) Lee Chih-kai	14.300	15.000	13.166	14.366	13.866	13.100	83.798
13	(Brazil) Caio Souza	13.833	13.033	13.933	14.366	14.700	13.900	83.765
14	(United Kingdom) James Hall	14.200	14.066	13.633	14.633	14.200	12.800	83.532
15	(Switzerland) Pablo Brägger	14.225	13.200	13.400	12.900	14.666	14.433	82.824
16	(United States) Yul Moldauer	13.666	13.133	13.733	14.366	14.666	12.766	82.330
17	(Italy) Ludovico Edalli	13.533	13.800	13.366	13.866	13.600	13.733	81.898
18	(France) Loris Frasca	14.066	13.566	12.933	14.833	13.433	13.033	81.864
19	(Germany) Andreas Toba	13.500	12.566	13.600	14.366	13.908	13.700	81.640
20	(South Korea) Lee Jung-hyo	13.666	14.000	13.566	14.200	14.000	11.991	81.423
21	(Kazakhstan) Milad Karimi	14.300	11.833	13.133	13.366	14.100	13.400	80.132
22	(Spain) Néstor Abad	12.200	12.666	13.700	14.233	13.766	13.533	80.098
23	(Switzerland) Oliver Hegi	12.266	14.233	12.766	12.966	14.066	12.333	78.630
24	(Lithuania) Robert Tvorogal	13.233	11.633	13.166	13.700	13.833	11.700	77.265

=== Floor ===
Carlos Yulo, the youngest competitor in the final, improved on his bronze-medal finish from the 2018 World Championships to win the Philippines' first-ever World title in artistic gymnastics. No Japanese gymnast made the podium for the first time since the 2009 World Championships; the team's highest finisher in qualifications, Daiki Hashimoto, was the third reserve.

Rank	Gymnast	D Score	E Score	Pen.	Total
1st place, gold medalist(s)	(Philippines) Carlos Yulo	6.500	8.800		15.300
2nd place, silver medalist(s)	(Israel) Artem Dolgopyat	6.400	8.800		15.200
3rd place, bronze medalist(s)	(China) Xiao Ruoteng	6.200	8.733		14.933
4	(Russia) Artur Dalaloyan	6.200	8.600		14.800
5	(China) Lin Chaopan	6.200	8.500		14.700
6	(Russia) Nikita Nagornyy	6.200	8.266	0.300	14.166
7	(South Korea) Kim Han-sol	6.300	7.533		13.833
8	(United Kingdom) Dominick Cunningham	6.100	7.566	0.100	13.566

=== Pommel horse ===
Max Whitlock of Great Britain won his third pommel horse title. Rhys McClenaghan of Ireland became his country's first world medalist by earning the bronze.

Rank	Gymnast	D Score	E Score	Pen.	Total
1st place, gold medalist(s)	(United Kingdom) Max Whitlock	7.000	8.500		15.500
2nd place, silver medalist(s)	(Chinese Taipei) Lee Chih-kai	6.500	8.933		15.433
3rd place, bronze medalist(s)	(Republic of Ireland) Rhys McClenaghan	6.400	9.000		15.400
4	(China) Zou Jingyuan	6.300	8.700		15.000
5	(Japan) Kazuma Kaya	6.600	8.266		14.866
6	(France) Cyril Tommasone	6.300	8.533		14.833
7	(Chinese Taipei) Shiao Yu-jan	6.000	8.733		14.733
8	(Russia) David Belyavskiy	6.400	7.166		13.566
9	(Japan) Daiki Hashimoto	5.900	7.433		13.333

=== Rings ===
Turkey's İbrahim Çolak won the country's first-ever World title in artistic gymnastics. For the first time in the 2016–2020 Olympic cycle, not a single still rings Olympic medalist managed to finish on the podium. The current Olympic champion, silver medalist, and bronze medalist finished fourth, fifth, and sixth, respectively, the same order as their 2016 Olympic finish.

Rank	Gymnast	D Score	E Score	Pen.	Total
1st place, gold medalist(s)	(Turkey) İbrahim Çolak	6.200	8.733		14.933
2nd place, silver medalist(s)	(Italy) Marco Lodadio	6.300	8.600		14.900
3rd place, bronze medalist(s)	(France) Samir Aït Saïd	6.200	8.600		14.800
4	(Greece) Eleftherios Petrounias	6.300	8.433		14.733
5	(Brazil) Arthur Zanetti	6.200	8.525		14.725
6	(Russia) Denis Ablyazin	6.300	8.366		14.666
7	(Armenia) Artur Tovmasyan	6.100	8.100		14.200
8	(Germany) Nick Klessing	6.100	8.066		14.166

=== Vault ===
Position	Gymnast	Vault 1				Vault 2				Total
Position	Gymnast	D Score	E Score	Pen.	Score 1	D Score	E Score	Pen.	Score 2	Total
1st place, gold medalist(s)	(Russia) Nikita Nagornyy	5.600	9.333		14.933	5.600	9.400		15.000	14.966
2nd place, silver medalist(s)	(Russia) Artur Dalaloyan	5.600	9.333		14.933	5.600	9.333		14.933	14.933
3rd place, bronze medalist(s)	(Ukraine) Igor Radivilov	5.600	9.233		14.833	5.600	9.066		14.666	14.749
4	(Romania) Marian Drăgulescu	5.600	9.366		14.966	5.400	8.883		14.283	14.624
5	(United Kingdom) Dominick Cunningham	5.200	9.366		14.566	5.400	9.166		14.566	14.566
6	(Vietnam) Lê Thanh Tùng	5.600	9.066		14.666	5.200	9.200		14.400	14.533
7	(Hong Kong) Shek Wai Hung	6.000	7.933		13.933	6.000	9.000		15.000	14.466
8	(South Korea) Yang Hak-seon	6.000	8.033	0.300	13.733	5.600	9.300		14.900	14.316

=== Parallel bars ===
Two-time and reigning World Champion Zou Jingyuan of China failed to qualify to the final to try and win a third title in a row. Despite this, he earned the highest score of the competition in the team final with a 16.383. Joe Fraser of Great Britain became the first British athlete to win the gold on the parallel bars.

Rank	Gymnast	D Score	E Score	Pen.	Total
1st place, gold medalist(s)	(United Kingdom) Joe Fraser	6.600	8.400		15.000
2nd place, silver medalist(s)	(Turkey) Ahmet Önder	6.200	8.783		14.983
3rd place, bronze medalist(s)	(Japan) Kazuma Kaya	6.300	8.666		14.966
4	(China) Xiao Ruoteng	6.400	8.566		14.966
5	(Turkey) Ferhat Arıcan	6.500	8.400		14.900
6	(China) Sun Wei	6.200	8.266		14.466
7	(Ukraine) Petro Pakhniuk	6.500	7.700		14.200
8	(Germany) Lukas Dauser	6.300	7.533		13.833

=== Horizontal bar ===
Brazil's Arthur Mariano became the first Brazilian athlete to win the gold medal on the high bar.

Rank	Gymnast	D Score	E Score	Pen.	Total
1st place, gold medalist(s)	(Brazil) Arthur Mariano	6.300	8.600		14.900
2nd place, silver medalist(s)	(Croatia) Tin Srbić	6.200	8.466		14.666
3rd place, bronze medalist(s)	(Russia) Artur Dalaloyan	6.100	8.433		14.533
4	(Japan) Daiki Hashimoto	6.200	8.033		14.233
5	(United States) Sam Mikulak	6.300	7.766		14.066
6	(China) Lin Chaopan	6.200	7.833		14.033
7	(Australia) Tyson Bull	6.000	7.200		13.200
8	(Chinese Taipei) Tang Chia-hung	5.800	6.966		12.766

== Women's results ==
=== Team ===
After qualifying in eighth place, Italy won the team bronze medal, their first team medal at a World Championships since 1950. Meanwhile, the United States extended their streak to five consecutive World Championship team gold medals, tying the record set by Romania (1994–2001). The USA's team gold medal is also the 21st World Championship medal for Simone Biles, giving her the record for the most World Championship medals won by a female gymnast. The previous record, 20 medals, was first set by Svetlana Khorkina in 2001 and tied by Biles at the 2018 World Artistic Gymnastics Championships.

Rank	Team	Vault (gymnastics)	Uneven bars	Balance beam	Floor (gymnastics)	Total
1st place, gold medalist(s)	United States	45.166 (1)	42.299 (2)	40.966 (1)	43.899 (1)	172.330
1st place, gold medalist(s)	Simone Biles	15.400	14.600	14.433	15.333	172.330
1st place, gold medalist(s)	Jade Carey	15.166			14.333	172.330
1st place, gold medalist(s)	Kara Eaker			14.000		172.330
1st place, gold medalist(s)	Sunisa Lee		14.733	12.533	14.233	172.330
1st place, gold medalist(s)	Grace McCallum	14.600	12.966			172.330
2nd place, silver medalist(s)	Russia	43.899 (2)	43.665 (1)	38.465 (6)	40.500 (3)	166.529
2nd place, silver medalist(s)	Anastasia Agafonova		14.566	12.166		166.529
2nd place, silver medalist(s)	Lilia Akhaimova	14.733		12.533	13.600	166.529
2nd place, silver medalist(s)	Angelina Melnikova	14.533	14.333	13.766	13.900	166.529
2nd place, silver medalist(s)	Aleksandra Shchekoldina	14.633			13.000	166.529
2nd place, silver medalist(s)	Daria Spiridonova		14.766			166.529
3rd place, bronze medalist(s)	Italy	43.732 (3)	42.299 (3)	38.799 (4)	39.966 (6)	164.796
3rd place, bronze medalist(s)	Desiree Carofiglio				13.333	164.796
3rd place, bronze medalist(s)	Alice D'Amato	14.533	14.133			164.796
3rd place, bronze medalist(s)	Asia D'Amato	14.533		13.266	13.333	164.796
3rd place, bronze medalist(s)	Elisa Iorio		13.900	11.933		164.796
3rd place, bronze medalist(s)	Giorgia Villa	14.666	14.266	13.600	13.300	164.796
4	China	43.066 (5)	40.199 (6)	40.599 (2)	40.366 (4)	164.230
4	Chen Yile		13.733	14.000		164.230
4	Li Shijia	14.166		14.266		164.230
4	Liu Tingting		11.900	12.333	13.433	164.230
4	Qi Qi	14.600			13.433	164.230
4	Tang Xijing	14.300	14.566		13.500	164.230
5	France	43.599 (4)	40.565 (5)	38.732 (5)	40.732 (2)	163.628
5	Marine Boyer			13.833	13.266	163.628
5	Lorette Charpy		14.033	12.666		163.628
5	Mélanie de Jesus dos Santos	14.733	14.366	12.233	14.166	163.628
5	Aline Friess	14.900			13.300	163.628
5	Claire Pontlevoy	13.966	12.166			163.628
6	Great Britain	42.632 (8)	42.099 (4)	39.499 (3)	37.265 (8)	161.495
6	Becky Downie		14.900	13.566		161.495
6	Ellie Downie	14.566	14.033			161.495
6	Georgia-Mae Fenton		13.166	12.233	11.933	161.495
6	Taeja James	13.800			13.266	161.495
6	Alice Kinsella	14.266		13.700	12.066	161.495
7	Canada	43.033 (6)	39.899 (7)	37.965 (7)	39.666 (7)	160.563
7	Ellie Black	14.200	14.033	13.366	13.433	160.563
7	Brooklyn Moors	14.133	12.533	12.466	13.200	160.563
7	Shallon Olsen	14.700			13.033	160.563
7	Ana Padurariu			12.133		160.563
7	Victoria-Kayen Woo		13.333			160.563
8	Netherlands	42.732 (7)	39.098 (8)	37.432 (8)	40.165 (5)	159.427
8	Eythora Thorsdottir	14.466		11.400	13.633	159.427
8	Naomi Visser	14.066	14.066	13.166		159.427
8	Tisha Volleman	14.200			13.566	159.427
8	Lieke Wevers		12.466		12.966	159.427
8	Sanne Wevers		12.566	12.866		159.427

=== Individual all-around ===
Sixth-place qualifier Liu Tingting of China withdrew and was replaced by teammate Tang Xijing, who had been affected by the two-per-country rule; the start list was not reseeded and Tang replaced Liu in the top rotation group.

Simone Biles continued to extend her record streak, winning her fifth title. Tang would go to win silver, matching China's best-ever finish from Jiang Yuyuan at the 2010 World Championships. Angelina Melnikova's bronze is her first individual Worlds medal. The defending silver and bronze medalists, Mai Murakami of Japan and Morgan Hurd of the United States, both did not make their countries' respective teams for the World Championships.

Rank	Gymnast	Vault (gymnastics)	Uneven bars	Balance beam	Floor (gymnastics)	Total
1st place, gold medalist(s)	(United States) Simone Biles	15.233	14.733	14.633	14.400	58.999
2nd place, silver medalist(s)	(China) Tang Xijing	14.166	14.533	14.600	13.600	56.899
3rd place, bronze medalist(s)	(Russia) Angelina Melnikova	14.433	13.900	14.000	14.066	56.399
4	(Canada) Ellie Black	14.566	14.133	14.000	13.533	56.232
5	(Belgium) Nina Derwael	13.600	15.200	13.733	13.500	56.033
6	(Germany) Elisabeth Seitz	14.600	14.866	13.233	13.300	55.999
7	(Brazil) Flávia Saraiva	14.466	13.300	14.033	13.933	55.732
8	(United States) Sunisa Lee	14.466	13.133	13.833	14.200	55.632
9	(China) Li Shijia	14.433	13.366	14.000	13.300	55.099
10	(Germany) Sarah Voss	14.500	13.666	13.866	12.866	54.898
11	(France) Aline Friess	14.966	13.600	13.066	13.166	54.798
12	(United Kingdom) Alice Kinsella	14.266	13.766	13.800	12.933	54.765
13	(Japan) Asuka Teramoto	14.600	14.000	13.366	12.700	54.666
14	(Canada) Brooklyn Moors	14.166	13.266	13.500	13.566	54.498
15	(Ukraine) Diana Varinska	13.500	14.133	13.333	13.400	54.366
16	(Italy) Giorgia Villa	14.700	14.333	12.633	12.566	54.232
17	(Japan) Hitomi Hatakeda	13.800	13.866	13.533	12.733	53.932
18	(Switzerland) Giulia Steingruber	14.933	12.500	12.800	13.633	53.866
19	(Australia) Georgia Godwin	13.733	13.500	13.366	13.233	53.832
20	(France) Mélanie de Jesus dos Santos	14.633	11.933	13.500	13.500	53.566
21	(Spain) Cintia Rodríguez	13.333	13.700	11.833	12.600	51.466
22	(Russia) Lilia Akhaimova	14.533	12.066	11.400	13.466	51.465
23	(Netherlands) Naomi Visser	13.266	12.100	13.600	12.200	51.166
–	(Italy) Elisa Iorio	13.266	–	12.666	12.866	DNF

=== Vault ===
Position	Gymnast	Vault 1				Vault 2				Total
Position	Gymnast	D Score	E Score	Pen.	Score 1	D Score	E Score	Pen.	Score 2	Total
1st place, gold medalist(s)	(United States) Simone Biles	6.000	9.333		15.333	5.800	9.666		15.466	15.399
2nd place, silver medalist(s)	(United States) Jade Carey	6.000	9.166		15.166	5.800	9.100	0.300	14.600	14.883
3rd place, bronze medalist(s)	(United Kingdom) Ellie Downie	5.400	9.200		14.600	6.000	9.033		15.033	14.816
4	(Canada) Shallon Olsen	5.400	9.200		14.600	6.000	8.866		14.866	14.733
5	(China) Qi Qi	5.400	9.200		14.600	5.800	8.900		14.700	14.650
6	(Mexico) Alexa Moreno	5.800	8.766	0.100	14.466	5.600	9.200		14.800	14.633
7	(Russia) Lilia Akhaimova	5.800	8.900		14.700	5.600	8.733	0.300	14.033	14.366
8	(South Korea) Yeo Seo-jeong	6.200	8.033	0.300	13.933	5.400	9.033		14.433	14.183

=== Uneven bars ===
Rank	Gymnast	D Score	E Score	Pen.	Total
1st place, gold medalist(s)	(Belgium) Nina Derwael	6.500	8.733		15.233
2nd place, silver medalist(s)	(United Kingdom) Becky Downie	6.500	8.500		15.000
3rd place, bronze medalist(s)	(United States) Sunisa Lee	6.400	8.400		14.800
4	(Russia) Angelina Melnikova	6.300	8.433		14.733
5	(United States) Simone Biles	6.200	8.500		14.700
6	(Russia) Daria Spiridonova	6.300	8.333		14.633
7	(China) Liu Tingting	5.900	8.500		14.400
8	(Germany) Elisabeth Seitz	6.000	7.566		13.566

=== Balance beam ===
Eighth-place qualifier Ellie Black of Canada withdrew after sustaining an injury during the all-around final earlier in the week and was replaced by first alternate Kara Eaker of the United States; Eaker previously had qualified into the final, before dropping to first alternate following an inquiry about her score in qualification.

Simone Biles' gold medal in the event was her 24th World Championships medal, breaking the record for the most world medals earned by a single gymnast. The previous record, 23 medals, had been set by Belarusian gymnast Vitaly Scherbo at the 1996 World Artistic Gymnastics Championships.

Rank	Gymnast	D Score	E Score	Pen.	Total
1st place, gold medalist(s)	(United States) Simone Biles	6.400	8.666		15.066
2nd place, silver medalist(s)	(China) Liu Tingting	6.200	8.233		14.433
3rd place, bronze medalist(s)	(China) Li Shijia	6.100	8.300	0.100	14.300
4	(United States) Kara Eaker	5.900	8.100		14.000
5	(France) Mélanie de Jesus dos Santos	5.500	8.466		13.966
6	(Brazil) Flávia Saraiva	5.700	7.700		13.400
7	(Germany) Sarah Voss	5.400	7.866		13.266
8	(Canada) Ana Padurariu	5.600	6.333		11.933

=== Floor ===
Eighth-place qualifier Nina Derwael of Belgium withdrew from the competition as a precaution to avoid aggravating a lingering injury, allowing first reserve Brooklyn Moors of Canada to take her place. Moors had previously qualified to the final, before an inquiry about her score in qualification dropped her to first alternate.

Rank	Gymnast	D Score	E Score	Pen.	Total
1st place, gold medalist(s)	(United States) Simone Biles	6.700	8.533	0.100	15.133
2nd place, silver medalist(s)	(United States) Sunisa Lee	5.700	8.433		14.133
3rd place, bronze medalist(s)	(Russia) Angelina Melnikova	5.800	8.266		14.066
4	(Brazil) Flávia Saraiva	5.500	8.466		13.966
5	(France) Mélanie de Jesus dos Santos	5.500	8.433	0.100	13.833
6	(Spain) Roxana Popa	5.400	8.400		13.800
7	(Canada) Brooklyn Moors	5.300	8.400	0.100	13.600
8	(Russia) Lilia Akhaimova	6.000	7.800	0.300	13.500

== Qualification ==
=== Men's results ===
==== Team ====
The top 9 teams qualify to the 2020 Summer Olympic Games, excluding the teams already qualified during the 2018 World Artistic Gymnastics Championships.

Rank	Team	Floor (gymnastics)	Pommel horse	Rings (gymnastics)	Vault (gymnastics)	Parallel bars	Horizontal bar	Total	Qual.
1	Russia	43.399 (2)	42.399 (2)	43.133 (1)	44.399 (1)	43.799 (4)	42.799 (2)	259.928	Q
1	Denis Ablyazin	–		14.600	14.366			259.928	Q
1	David Belyavskiy		14.633			13.533	14.066	259.928	Q
1	Artur Dalaloyan	14.733	13.366	14.133	15.133	14.733	14.433	259.928	Q
1	Nikita Nagornyy	14.900	14.033	14.400	14.900	14.800	14.300	259.928	Q
1	Ivan Stretovich	13.766	13.733	13.341	14.266	14.266	14.066	259.928	Q
2	China	43.932 (1)	41.258 (6)	42.400 (3)	43.566 (4)	44.399 (1)	42.799 (1)	258.354	Q
2	Deng Shudi	14.166	12.366	14.100	13.700	14.466	13.900	258.354	Q
2	Lin Chaopan	14.933			14.100		14.433	258.354	Q
2	Sun Wei	14.166	12.900	14.000	14.700	14.800	14.333	258.354	Q
2	Xiao Ruoteng	14.833	13.400	13.833	14.766	14.966	14.033	258.354	Q
2	Zou Jingyuan		14.958	14.300		14.633		258.354	Q
3	Japan	42.232 (6)	43.916 (1)	42.282 (4)	42.998 (11)	44.133 (2)	42.465 (3)	258.026	Q
3	Daiki Hashimoto	14.433	14.883		14.766		14.366	258.026	Q
3	Yuya Kamoto	13.866		14.283	13.966	14.700	14.033	258.026	Q
3	Kazuma Kaya	13.933	14.633	14.033	14.266	14.800	14.066	258.026	Q
3	Kakeru Tanigawa	12.566	14.400	13.633	12.466	14.633	12.833	258.026	Q
3	Wataru Tanigawa		13.333	13.966		13.900		258.026	Q
4	Ukraine	41.899 (9)	41.833 (3)	42.132 (5)	44.066 (3)	43.866 (3)	39.732 (17)	253.528	Q
4	Vladyslav Hryko	13.633	13.166			13.800	11.133	253.528	Q
4	Petro Pakhniuk	14.133	13.700	13.466	14.500	15.033	13.766	253.528	Q
4	Igor Radivilov			14.533	14.833			253.528	Q
4	Oleg Verniaiev	13.000	14.600	13.933	14.733	14.800	13.233	253.528	Q
4	Yevgen Yudenkov	14.133	13.533	13.666	13.733	14.033	12.733	253.528	Q
5	Great Britain	43.082 (3)	40.766 (8)	41.465 (9)	43.365 (5)	42.766 (8)	40.965 (8)	252.409	Q
5	Dominick Cunningham	14.600		13.833	14.766			252.409	Q
5	Joe Fraser	13.800	13.500	13.866	14.066	15.000	12.333	252.409	Q
5	James Hall	14.166	12.000	13.766	14.066	13.766	14.166	252.409	Q
5	Giarnni Regini-Moran	14.316	11.866	13.033	14.533	13.066	13.266	252.409	Q
5	Max Whitlock		15.266			14.000	13.533	252.409	Q
6	Switzerland	42.074 (7)	39.632 (9)	40.532 (13)	43.299 (7)	43.665 (5)	42.198 (4)	251.400	Q
6	Christian Baumann		12.733	13.533		14.566	13.333	251.400	Q
6	Pablo Brägger	14.141	13.266	13.266	14.200	14.666	13.966	251.400	Q
6	Benjamin Gischard	14.033	13.633		14.333			251.400	Q
6	Oliver Hegi	13.733	12.566	13.233	14.500	14.433	14.366	251.400	Q
6	Eddy Yusof	13.900		13.733	14.466	14.266	13.866	251.400	Q
7	United States	41.265 (15)	39.065 (13)	41.533 (8)	43.165 (9)	43.266 (6)	42.065 (5)	250.359	Q
7	Trevor Howard			14.033	13.933			250.359	Q
7	Sam Mikulak	11.533	12.600	13.700	14.566	14.333	14.866	250.359	Q
7	Akash Modi	13.333	13.533	13.666	14.066	14.533	12.166	250.359	Q
7	Yul Moldauer	14.466	12.666	13.800	14.533	14.400	13.033	250.359	Q
7	Shane Wiskus	13.466	12.866			14.033	14.166	250.359	Q
8	Chinese Taipei	41.832 (11)	41.749 (4)	41.099 (11)	42.849 (13)	41.265 (15)	41.299 (7)	250.093	Q
8	Hsu Ping-chien	12.500	12.100	12.800	13.800	12.300	13.133	250.093	Q
8	Lee Chih-kai	14.333	14.966	13.500	14.483	13.966	13.233	250.093	Q
8	Shiao Yu-jan	13.333	14.683		13.441			250.093	Q
8	Tang Chia-hung	14.166	11.766	13.766	14.566	13.566	14.933	250.093	Q
8	Yu Chao-wei			13.833		13.733	12.933	250.093	Q
9	South Korea	42.765 (4)	39.332 (12)	41.132 (10)	44.232 (2)	41.591 (14)	40.599 (11)	249.651	R1
9	Kim Han-sol	14.666	12.700	13.533	14.566	14.000	12.966	249.651	R1
9	Lee Jun-ho	14.366	12.800		14.366	13.325	13.333	249.651	R1
9	Lee Jung-hyo	13.433	13.566	13.566	13.633	14.266	13.366	249.651	R1
9	Park Min-soo		12.966	13.766		13.000	13.900	249.651	R1
9	Yang Hak-seon	13.733		13.800	15.300			249.651	R1
10	Brazil	41.899 (10)	39.432 (10)	41.699 (6)	43.341 (6)	41.699 (12)	39.166 (21)	247.236	R2
10	Francisco Barretto Júnior		13.733	12.933		13.600	12.433	247.236	R2
10	Lucas Bitencourt	13.000	12.666	11.433	14.300	13.466	12.133	247.236	R2
10	Arthur Mariano	14.166	12.466		14.575	12.800	14.600	247.236	R2
10	Caio Souza	14.033	13.033	14.066	14.466	14.633	11.666	247.236	R2
10	Arthur Zanetti	13.700		14.700	13.966			247.236	R2
11	Spain	42.466 (5)	38.899 (15)	39.866 (17)	43.065 (10)	42.499 (9)	39.932 (16)	246.727	R3
11	Néstor Abad	14.100	13.000	13.600	14.266	14.000	12.966	246.727	R3
11	Thierno Diallo	13.166	12.866			13.500		246.727	R3
11	Nicolau Mir	14.533		13.100	14.366	14.433	13.266	246.727	R3
11	Joel Plata	13.833	12.500	13.166	13.966	14.066	13.700	246.727	R3
11	Adria Vera		13.033	12.900	14.433		12.500	246.727	R3
12	Germany	41.665 (13)	38.798 (16)	41.699 (7)	41.465 (21)	41.999 (11)	40.882 (9)	246.508	R4
12	Lukas Dauser		12.266			15.033	13.700	246.508	R4
12	Philipp Herder	13.933	11.800	13.133	13.766	13.166	13.566	246.508	R4
12	Nick Klessing	14.066		14.566	13.100			246.508	R4
12	Karim Rida	13.666	12.966	13.100	13.533	12.233	13.400	246.508	R4
12	Andreas Toba	13.633	13.566	14.000	14.166	13.800	13.616	246.508	R4

==== Individual all-around ====
Rank	Gymnast	Floor (gymnastics)	Pommel horse	Rings (gymnastics)	Vault (gymnastics)	Parallel bars	Horizontal bar	Total	Qual.
1	(Russia) Nikita Nagornyy	14.900	14.033	14.400	14.900	14.800	14.300	87.333	Q
2	(Russia) Artur Dalaloyan	14.733	13.366	14.133	15.133	14.733	14.433	86.531	Q
3	(China) Xiao Ruoteng	14.833	13.400	13.833	14.766	14.966	14.033	85.831	Q
4	(Japan) Kazuma Kaya	13.933	14.633	14.033	14.266	14.800	14.066	85.731	Q
5	(China) Sun Wei	14.166	12.900	14.000	14.700	14.800	14.333	84.899	Q
6	(Ukraine) Petro Pakhniuk	14.133	13.700	13.466	14.500	15.033	13.766	84.598	Q
7	(Chinese Taipei) Lee Chih-kai	14.333	14.966	13.500	14.483	13.966	13.233	84.481	Q
8	(Ukraine) Oleg Verniaiev	13.000	14.600	13.933	14.733	14.800	13.233	84.299	Q
9	(Switzerland) Pablo Brägger	14.141	13.266	13.266	14.200	14.666	13.966	83.505	Q
10	(Russia) Ivan Stretovich	13.766	13.733	13.341	14.266	14.266	14.066	83.438	–
11	(United States) Yul Moldauer	14.466	12.666	13.800	14.533	14.400	13.033	82.898	Q
12	(Switzerland) Oliver Hegi	13.733	12.566	13.233	14.500	14.433	14.366	82.831	Q
13	(Germany) Andreas Toba	13.633	13.566	14.000	14.166	13.800	13.616	82.781	Q
14	(Chinese Taipei) Tang Chia-hung	14.166	11.766	13.766	14.566	13.566	14.933	82.763	Q
15	(China) Deng Shudi	14.166	12.366	14.100	13.700	14.466	13.900	82.698	–
16	(United Kingdom) Joe Fraser	13.800	13.500	13.866	14.066	15.000	12.333	82.565	Q
17	(South Korea) Kim Han-sol	14.666	12.700	13.533	14.566	14.000	12.966	82.431	Q
18	(Philippines) Carlos Yulo	14.633	12.466	13.166	14.433	14.433	13.033	82.164	Q
19	(Spain) Néstor Abad	14.100	13.000	13.600	14.266	14.000	12.966	81.932	Q
20	(United Kingdom) James Hall	14.166	12.000	13.766	14.066	13.766	14.166	81.930	Q
21	(Cuba) Manrique Larduet	13.833	12.800	13.666	14.633	13.100	13.866	81.898	Q
22	(Brazil) Caio Souza	14.033	13.033	14.066	14.466	14.633	11.666	81.897	Q
23	(Ukraine) Yevgen Yudenkov	14.133	13.533	13.666	13.733	14.033	12.733	81.831	–
24	(South Korea) Lee Jung-hyo	13.433	13.566	13.566	13.633	14.266	13.366	81.830	Q
25	(Italy) Ludovico Edalli	13.833	13.566	13.166	14.000	13.900	13.233	81.698	Q
26	(Kazakhstan) Milad Karimi	14.433	11.800	13.100	14.366	14.000	13.900	81.599	Q
27	(United States) Sam Mikulak	11.533	12.600	13.700	14.566	14.333	14.866	81.598	Q
28	(France) Loris Frasca	14.166	13.533	13.100	14.433	13.266	13.100	81.598	R1
29	(Lithuania) Robert Tvorogal	13.566	12.866	13.200	13.733	14.100	14.075	81.540	R2
30	(Israel) Alexander Shatilov	14.300	13.300	12.766	14.041	13.600	13.500	81.507	R3
31	(United States) Akash Modi	13.333	13.533	13.666	14.066	14.533	12.166	81.297	–
32	(Kazakhstan) Akim Mussayev	13.800	14.133	12.900	14.200	13.600	12.600	81.233	R4

==== Floor ====
Rank	Gymnast	D Score	E Score	Pen.	Total	Qual.
1	(Israel) Artem Dolgopyat	6.400	8.633		15.033	Q
2	(China) Lin Chaopan	6.200	8.733		14.933	Q
3	(Russia) Nikita Nagornyy	6.400	8.500		14.900	Q
4	(China) Xiao Ruoteng	6.200	8.633		14.833	Q
5	(Russia) Artur Dalaloyan	6.500	8.233		14.733	Q
6	(South Korea) Kim Han-sol	6.100	8.566		14.666	Q
7	(Philippines) Carlos Yulo	6.500	8.133		14.633	Q
8	(United Kingdom) Dominick Cunningham	6.100	8.500		14.600	Q
9	(Spain) Nicolau Mir	6.000	8.533		14.533	R1
10	(United States) Yul Moldauer	5.800	8.666		14.466	R2
11	(Japan) Daiki Hashimoto	5.800	8.633		14.433	R3

==== Pommel horse ====
Rank	Gymnast	D Score	E Score	Pen.	Total	Qual.
1	(United Kingdom) Max Whitlock	6.900	8.366		15.266	Q
2	(Republic of Ireland) Rhys McClenaghan	6.300	8.900		15.200	Q
3	(Chinese Taipei) Lee Chih-kai	6.200	8.766		14.966	Q
4	(China) Zou Jingyuan	6.000	8.958		14.958	Q
5	(Japan) Daiki Hashimoto	6.000	8.883		14.883	Q
6	(Chinese Taipei) Shiao Yu-jan	6.000	8.683		14.683	Q
7	(France) Cyril Tommasone	6.300	8.366		14.666	Q
8	(Japan) Kazuma Kaya	6.400	8.233		14.633	Q
8	(Russia) David Belyavskiy	6.400	8.233		14.633	Q
10	(Ukraine) Oleg Verniaiev	6.500	8.100		14.600	R1
11	(Japan) Kakeru Tanigawa	6.300	8.100		14.400	–
12	(Kazakhstan) Nariman Kurbanov	5.900	8.400		14.300	R2
13	(Armenia) Harutyun Merdinyan	5.800	8.333		14.133	R3

==== Rings ====
Rank	Gymnast	D Score	E Score	Pen.	Total	Qual.
1	(Turkey) İbrahim Çolak	6.200	8.658		14.858	Q
2	(Brazil) Arthur Zanetti	6.100	8.600		14.700	Q
3	(France) Samir Aït Saïd	6.200	8.500		14.700	Q
4	(Greece) Eleftherios Petrounias	6.300	8.400		14.700	Q
5	(Italy) Marco Lodadio	6.300	8.366		14.666	Q
6	(Russia) Denis Ablyazin	6.100	8.500		14.600	Q
7	(Germany) Nick Klessing	6.000	8.566		14.566	Q
8	(Armenia) Artur Tovmasyan	6.100	8.466		14.566	Q
9	(Ukraine) Igor Radivilov	6.300	8.233		14.533	R1
10	(Argentina) Federico Molinari	6.200	8.300		14.500	R2
11	(Iran) Mehdi Ahmadkohani	6.200	8.233		14.433	R3

==== Vault ====
Rank	Gymnast	Vault 1				Vault 2				Total	Qual.
Rank	Gymnast	D Score	E Score	Pen.	Score 1	D Score	E Score	Pen.	Score 2	Total	Qual.
1	(South Korea) Yang Hak-seon	6.000	9.300		15.300	5.600	9.066	0.100	14.566	14.933	Q
2	(Russia) Artur Dalaloyan	5.600	9.533		15.133	5.600	9.000	0.300	14.300	14.716	Q
3	(Hong Kong) Shek Wai Hung	6.000	8.966		14.966	6.000	8.466	0.100	14.366	14.666	Q
4	(Ukraine) Igor Radivilov	5.600	9.233		14.833	5.600	8.900		14.500	14.666	Q
5	(Vietnam) Lê Thanh Tùng	5.600	9.300		14.900	5.200	9.166		14.366	14.633	Q
6	(Romania) Marian Drăgulescu	5.600	9.016		14.616	5.800	8.933	0.100	14.633	14.624	Q
7	(Russia) Nikita Nagornyy	5.600	9.300		14.900	5.600	8.733		14.333	14.616	Q
8	(United Kingdom) Dominick Cunningham	5.600	9.166		14.766	5.400	8.966		14.366	14.566	Q
9	(South Korea) Kim Han-sol	5.600	9.066	0.100	14.566	5.200	9.200		14.400	14.483	R1
10	(France) Loris Frasca	5.600	8.833		14.433	5.600	8.933		14.533	14.483	R2
11	(Australia) James Bacueti	6.000	8.666		14.666	5.200	9.000		14.200	14.433	R3

==== Parallel bars ====
Rank	Gymnast	D Score	E Score	Pen.	Total	Qual.
1	(Germany) Lukas Dauser	6.300	8.733		15.033	Q
2	(Ukraine) Petro Pakhniuk	6.500	8.533		15.033	Q
3	(United Kingdom) Joe Fraser	6.600	8.400		15.000	Q
4	(China) Xiao Ruoteng	6.200	8.766		14.966	Q
5	(Turkey) Ferhat Arıcan	6.500	8.433		14.933	Q
6	(China) Sun Wei	6.200	8.600		14.800	Q
6	(Turkey) Ahmet Önder	6.200	8.600		14.800	Q
8	(Japan) Kazuma Kaya	6.300	8.500		14.800	Q
9	(Russia) Nikita Nagornyy	6.400	8.400		14.800	R1
10	(Ukraine) Oleg Verniaiev	6.600	8.200		14.800	R2
11	(Russia) Artur Dalaloyan	6.400	8.333		14.733	R3

==== Horizontal bar ====
Rank	Gymnast	D Score	E Score	Pen.	Total	Qual.
1	(Chinese Taipei) Tang Chia-hung	6.200	8.733		14.933	Q
2	(United States) Sam Mikulak	6.100	8.766		14.866	Q
3	(Croatia) Tin Srbić	6.200	8.633		14.833	Q
4	(Brazil) Arthur Mariano	6.300	8.300		14.600	Q
5	(Russia) Artur Dalaloyan	6.000	8.433		14.433	Q
6	(China) Lin Chaopan	6.500	7.933		14.433	Q
7	(Australia) Tyson Bull	6.000	8.366		14.366	Q
8	(Japan) Daiki Hashimoto	6.100	8.266		14.366	Q
9	(Switzerland) Oliver Hegi	6.200	8.166		14.366	R1
10	(China) Sun Wei	6.000	8.333		14.333	R2
11	(Russia) Nikita Nagornyy	5.900	8.400		14.300	R3

=== Women's results ===
==== Team ====
The top 9 teams qualify to the 2020 Summer Olympic Games, excluding the teams already qualified during the 2018 World Artistic Gymnastics Championships.

Rank	Team	Vault (gymnastics)	Uneven bars	Balance beam	Floor (gymnastics)	Total	Qual.
1	United States	44.932 (1)	44.374 (2)	41.666 (2)	43.233 (1)	174.205	Q
1	Simone Biles	15.066	14.733	14.800	14.833	174.205	Q
1	Jade Carey	15.300			14.200	174.205	Q
1	Kara Eaker		14.000	13.466		174.205	Q
1	Sunisa Lee	14.566	15.000	13.400	14.200	174.205	Q
1	Grace McCallum	14.566	14.641	12.933	13.766	174.205	Q
2	China	43.265 (5)	43.765 (3)	43.066 (1)	39.065 (8)	169.161	Q
2	Chen Yile		14.366	14.266		169.161	Q
2	Li Shijia	14.466	14.166	14.500	12.600	169.161	Q
2	Liu Tingting	13.566	14.766	14.300	13.233	169.161	Q
2	Qi Qi	14.533			12.966	169.161	Q
2	Tang Xijing	14.266	14.633	11.733	12.866	169.161	Q
3	Russia	43.666 (3)	44.416 (1)	39.299 (5)	40.699 (2)	168.080	Q
3	Anastasia Agafonova	13.400	14.700	13.033	12.666	168.080	Q
3	Lilia Akhaimova	14.733	13.366	12.900	13.933	168.080	Q
3	Angelina Melnikova	14.433	14.700	13.366	14.100	168.080	Q
3	Aleksandra Shchekoldina	14.500		12.000	11.866	168.080	Q
3	Daria Spiridonova		15.016			168.080	Q
4	France	43.900 (2)	43.166 (4)	39.482 (3)	40.165 (3)	166.713	Q
4	Marine Boyer	13.733		13.166	12.966	166.713	Q
4	Lorette Charpy		14.166	12.600	13.233	166.713	Q
4	Mélanie de Jesus dos Santos	14.600	14.600	13.616	13.966	166.713	Q
4	Aline Friess	15.000	13.566	12.700	12.733	166.713	Q
4	Claire Pontlevoy	14.300	14.400			166.713	Q
5	Canada	42.933 (7)	41.199 (12)	39.333 (4)	39.457 (7)	162.922	Q
5	Ellie Black	14.200	14.266	13.533	13.200	162.922	Q
5	Brooklyn Moors	13.900	13.333	12.133	13.566	162.922	Q
5	Shallon Olsen	14.833			12.691	162.922	Q
5	Ana Padurariu		13.433	13.500		162.922	Q
5	Victoria-Kayen Woo	13.500	13.500	12.300	12.500	162.922	Q
6	Netherlands	42.733 (10)	40.999 (13)	38.999 (6)	39.932 (4)	162.663	Q
6	Eythora Thorsdottir	14.400	11.466	13.333	12.966	162.663	Q
6	Naomi Visser	13.933	13.466	12.466	13.366	162.663	Q
6	Tisha Volleman	14.400			13.533	162.663	Q
6	Lieke Wevers	13.733	13.900	10.366	13.033	162.663	Q
6	Sanne Wevers		13.633	13.200		162.663	Q
7	Great Britain	42.532 (13)	43.099 (5)	38.899 (7)	37.433 (20)	161.963	Q
7	Becky Downie		14.800	13.100		161.963	Q
7	Ellie Downie	14.466	12.666	12.366	12.433	161.963	Q
7	Georgia-Mae Fenton	13.533	14.333	11.566	12.500	161.963	Q
7	Taeja James	13.766			12.500	161.963	Q
7	Alice Kinsella	14.300	13.966	13.433	12.433	161.963	Q
8	Italy	43.666 (4)	42.566 (7)	36.999 (15)	38.700 (11)	161.931	Q
8	Desiree Carofiglio			11.266	13.400	161.931	Q
8	Alice D'Amato	14.500	14.133			161.931	Q
8	Asia D'Amato	14.500	14.000	11.833	12.100	161.931	Q
8	Elisa Iorio	14.366	14.133	12.633	12.400	161.931	Q
8	Giorgia Villa	14.666	14.300	12.533	12.900	161.931	Q
9	Germany	42.732 (11)	42.766 (6)	38.233 (9)	38.166 (15)	161.897	R1
9	Kim Bui	13.666	14.200		13.000	161.897	R1
9	Emelie Petz	13.766	13.233	11.533	12.166	161.897	R1
9	Pauline Schäfer			11.800		161.897	R1
9	Elisabeth Seitz	14.600	14.800	12.833	12.766	161.897	R1
9	Sarah Voss	14.366	13.766	13.600	12.400	161.897	R1
10	Belgium	41.266 (19)	42.040 (8)	38.200 (10)	39.732 (6)	161.238	R2
10	Maellyse Brassart	13.600	13.133	11.733	12.766	161.238	R2
10	Margaux Daveloose		13.166	12.900	13.366	161.238	R2
10	Senna Deriks	13.566	13.733	12.100		161.238	R2
10	Nina Derwael	13.500	15.141	13.200	13.600	161.238	R2
10	Jade Vansteenkiste	14.100			12.200	161.238	R2
11	Japan	42.766 (9)	41.232 (11)	38.565 (8)	38.665 (12)	161.228	R3
11	Hitomi Hatakeda	14.033	13.733	12.966	12.500	161.228	R3
11	Nagi Kajita		13.533	11.900	13.166	161.228	R3
11	Akari Matsumura	14.100		12.633	12.933	161.228	R3
11	Aiko Sugihara	14.033	13.266			161.228	R3
11	Asuka Teramoto	14.633	13.966	12.966	12.566	161.228	R3
12	Spain	41.065 (21)	41.690 (9)	36.466 (18)	39.800 (5)	159.021	R4
12	Marina González				12.733	159.021	R4
12	Ana Pérez	13.666	13.833	11.500	13.200	159.021	R4
12	Alba Petisco	13.633	12.833	12.366		159.021	R4
12	Roxana Popa	13.776	13.991	9.900	13.800	159.021	R4
12	Cintia Rodríguez	13.533	13.866	12.600	12.800	159.021	R4

==== Individual all-around ====
Rank	Gymnast	Vault (gymnastics)	Uneven bars	Balance beam	Floor (gymnastics)	Total	Qual.
1	(United States) Simone Biles	15.066	14.733	14.800	14.833	59.432	Q
2	(United States) Sunisa Lee	14.566	15.000	13.400	14.200	57.166	Q
3	(France) Mélanie de Jesus dos Santos	14.600	14.600	13.616	13.966	56.782	Q
4	(Russia) Angelina Melnikova	14.433	14.700	13.366	14.100	56.599	Q
5	(United States) Grace McCallum	14.566	14.641	12.933	13.766	55.906	–
6	(China) Liu Tingting	13.566	14.766	14.300	13.233	55.865	Q
7	(China) Li Shijia	14.466	14.166	14.500	12.600	55.732	Q
8	(Belgium) Nina Derwael	13.500	15.141	13.200	13.600	55.441	Q
9	(Canada) Ellie Black	14.200	14.266	13.533	13.200	55.199	Q
10	(Germany) Elisabeth Seitz	14.600	14.800	12.833	12.766	54.999	Q
11	(Brazil) Flávia Saraiva	14.566	12.833	13.700	13.833	54.932	Q
12	(Russia) Lilia Akhaimova	14.733	13.366	12.900	13.933	54.932	Q
13	(Italy) Giorgia Villa	14.666	14.300	12.533	12.900	54.399	Q
14	(Germany) Sarah Voss	14.366	13.766	13.600	12.400	54.132	Q
15	(United Kingdom) Alice Kinsella	14.300	13.966	13.433	12.433	54.132	Q
16	(Japan) Asuka Teramoto	14.633	13.966	12.966	12.566	54.131	Q
17	(France) Aline Friess	15.000	13.566	12.700	12.733	53.999	Q
18	(Russia) Anastasia Agafonova	13.400	14.700	13.033	12.666	53.799	–
19	(Switzerland) Giulia Steingruber	15.066	12.400	12.766	13.500	53.732	Q
20	(Italy) Elisa Iorio	14.366	14.133	12.633	12.400	53.532	Q
21	(China) Tang Xijing	14.266	14.633	11.733	12.866	53.498	–
22	(Australia) Georgia Godwin	13.866	13.566	12.866	13.033	53.331	Q
23	(Japan) Hitomi Hatakeda	14.033	13.733	12.966	12.500	53.232	Q
24	(Netherlands) Naomi Visser	13.933	13.466	12.466	13.366	53.231	Q
25	(Canada) Brooklyn Moors	13.900	13.333	12.133	13.566	52.932	Q
26	(Ukraine) Diana Varinska	13.500	13.733	12.966	12.700	52.899	Q
27	(Spain) Cintia Rodríguez	13.533	13.866	12.600	12.800	52.799	Q
28	(South Korea) Lee Yun-seo	13.333	14.133	12.433	12.600	52.499	R1
29	(Italy) Asia D'Amato	14.500	14.000	11.833	12.100	52.433	–
30	(Hungary) Zsófia Kovács	14.433	14.200	11.566	12.233	52.432	R2
31	(Argentina) Martina Dominici	14.200	13.300	12.366	12.566	52.432	R3
32	(Spain) Ana Pérez	13.666	13.833	11.500	13.200	52.199	R4

==== Vault ====
Rank	Gymnast	Vault 1				Vault 2				Total	Qual.
Rank	Gymnast	D Score	E Score	Pen.	Score 1	D Score	E Score	Pen.	Score 2	Total	Qual.
1	(United States) Jade Carey	6.000	9.300		15.300	5.800	9.300		15.100	15.200	Q
2	(United States) Simone Biles	6.000	9.366	0.300	15.066	5.800	9.533		15.333	15.199	Q
3	(Mexico) Alexa Moreno	5.800	9.100		14.900	5.600	9.133		14.733	14.816	Q
4	(United Kingdom) Ellie Downie	5.400	9.066		14.466	6.000	9.200	0.100	15.100	14.783	Q
5	(South Korea) Yeo Seo-jeong	5.800	9.133		14.933	5.400	9.200		14.600	14.766	Q
6	(Canada) Shallon Olsen	6.000	8.833		14.833	5.400	9.133		14.533	14.683	Q
7	(Russia) Lilia Akhaimova	5.800	8.933		14.733	5.600	8.933		14.533	14.633	Q
8	(China) Qi Qi	5.400	9.133		14.533	5.800	8.966	0.100	14.666	14.599	Q
9	(Switzerland) Giulia Steingruber	5.800	9.266		15.066	5.400	8.800	0.300	13.900	14.483	R1
10	(Canada) Ellie Black	5.400	8.800		14.200	5.200	9.100		14.300	14.250	R2
11	(North Korea) Kim Su-jong	5.400	8.800		14.200	6.000	8.000		14.000	14.100	R3

==== Uneven bars ====
Rank	Gymnast	D Score	E Score	Pen.	Total	Qual.
1	(Belgium) Nina Derwael	6.500	8.641		15.141	Q
2	(Russia) Daria Spiridonova	6.300	8.716		15.016	Q
3	(United States) Sunisa Lee	6.400	8.600		15.000	Q
4	(Germany) Elisabeth Seitz	6.200	8.600		14.800	Q
5	(United Kingdom) Becky Downie	6.300	8.500		14.800	Q
6	(China) Liu Tingting	6.000	8.766		14.766	Q
7	(United States) Simone Biles	6.200	8.533		14.733	Q
8	(Russia) Angelina Melnikova	6.300	8.400		14.700	Q
9	(Russia) Anastasia Agafonova	6.400	8.300		14.700	–
10	(United States) Grace McCallum	6.100	8.541		14.641	–
11	(China) Tang Xijing	6.000	8.633		14.633	R1
12	(France) Mélanie de Jesus dos Santos	6.100	8.500		14.600	R2
13	(France) Claire Pontlevoy	6.200	8.200		14.400	R3

==== Balance beam ====
Rank	Gymnast	D Score	E Score	Pen.	Total	Qual.
1	(United States) Simone Biles	6.500	8.300		14.800	Q
2	(China) Li Shijia	6.200	8.300		14.500	Q
3	(China) Liu Tingting	6.200	8.200	0.100	14.300	Q
4	(China) Chen Yile	6.400	7.866		14.266	–
5	(Brazil) Flávia Saraiva	5.800	7.900		13.700	Q
6	(France) Mélanie de Jesus dos Santos	5.700	7.916		13.616	Q
7	(Germany) Sarah Voss	5.700	7.900		13.600	Q
8	(Canada) Ellie Black	5.600	7.933		13.533	Q
9	(Canada) Ana Padurariu	5.900	7.600		13.500	Q
10	(United States) Kara Eaker	5.400	8.066		13.466	R1
11	(United Kingdom) Alice Kinsella	5.500	7.933		13.433	R2
12	(United States) Sunisa Lee	6.200	7.200		13.400	–
13	(Russia) Angelina Melnikova	5.400	7.966		13.366	R3

==== Floor ====
Rank	Gymnast	D Score	E Score	Pen.	Total	Qual.
1	(United States) Simone Biles	6.600	8.433	0.200	14.833	Q
2	(United States) Sunisa Lee	5.700	8.500		14.200	Q
3	(United States) Jade Carey	6.300	8.100	0.200	14.200	–
4	(Russia) Angelina Melnikova	5.900	8.200		14.100	Q
5	(France) Mélanie de Jesus dos Santos	5.800	8.266	0.100	13.966	Q
6	(Russia) Lilia Akhaimova	6.000	7.933		13.933	Q
7	(Brazil) Flávia Saraiva	5.500	8.333		13.833	Q
8	(Spain) Roxana Popa	5.400	8.400		13.800	Q
9	(United States) Grace McCallum	5.600	8.166		13.766	–
10	(Belgium) Nina Derwael	5.000	8.600		13.600	Q
11	(Canada) Brooklyn Moors	5.200	8.366		13.566	R1
12	(Netherlands) Tisha Volleman	5.300	8.233		13.533	R2
13	(Switzerland) Giulia Steingruber	5.400	8.100		13.500	R3

== Participating nations ==
- Albania (1)
- Algeria (4)
- Argentina (8)
- Armenia (4)
- Australia (11)
- Austria (6)
- Azerbaijan (4)
- Belgium (12)
- Belarus (8)
- Bolivia (2)
- Brazil (12)
- Bulgaria (3)
- Canada (12)
- Cayman Islands (1)
- Chile (4)
- China (12)
- Colombia (6)
- Costa Rica (5)
- Croatia (4)
- Cuba (4)
- Cyprus (5)
- Czech Republic (9)
- Denmark (6)
- Dominican Republic (4)
- Ecuador (3)
- Egypt (8)
- El Salvador (3)
- Spain (12)
- Finland (9)
- France (12)
- Great Britain (12)
- Georgia (4)
- Germany (12)
- Greece (6)
- Guatemala (5)
- Hong Kong (6)
- Hungary (12)
- Indonesia (2)
- India (6)
- Iran (2)
- Ireland (5)
- Iceland (3)
- Israel (6)
- Italy (12)
- Jamaica (6)
- Jordan (3)
- Japan (12)
- Kazakhstan (6)
- South Korea (12)
- Kuwait (3)
- Latvia (6)
- Lithuania (4)
- Luxembourg (1)
- Morocco (2)
- Malaysia (4)
- Mexico (9)
- Mongolia (1)
- Monaco (1)
- Netherlands (12)
- Nigeria (5)
- Norway (9)
- New Zealand (5)
- Panama (2)
- Peru (6)
- Philippines (1)
- Poland (4)
- Portugal (5)
- North Korea (7)
- Puerto Rico (6)
- Qatar (3)
- Romania (12)
- South Africa (3)
- Russia (12)
- Singapore (1)
- Slovenia (6)
- Serbia (5)
- Sri Lanka (1)
- Switzerland (12)
- Slovakia (3)
- Sweden (5)
- Syria (1)
- Thailand (2)
- Chinese Taipei (9)
- Trinidad and Tobago (1)
- Tunisia (2)
- Turkey (9)
- Ukraine (11)
- Uruguay (3)
- United States (12)
- Uzbekistan (6)
- Venezuela (3)
- Vietnam (6)
