= Gymnastics at the 2015 Summer Universiade – Men's horizontal bar =

Men's horizontal bar at the 2015 Summer Universiade
- Venue: Gwangju Women's University Universiade Gymnasium
- Date: July 7, 2015
- Competitors: 8 from 7 nations

Medalists
gold medal	Fabian Hambüchen	Germany
silver medal	Shogo Nonomura	Japan
bronze medal	Yuya Kamoto	Japan

The Men's horizontal bar Gymnastics at the 2015 Summer Universiade in Gwangju was held on 7 July at the Gwangju Women's University Universiade Gymnasium.

== Schedule ==
All times are Korea Standard Time (UTC+09:00)

Date	Time	Event
Tuesday, 7 July 2015	17:50	Final

== Results ==
Rank	Athlete	Score
1st place, gold medalist(s)	Fabian Hambüchen (GER)	15.266
2nd place, silver medalist(s)	Shogo Nonomura (JPN)	15.100
3rd place, bronze medalist(s)	Yuya Kamoto (JPN)	15.066
4	Park Min-soo (KOR)	15.000
5	Alexey Rostov (RUS)	14.733
6	Akash Modi (USA)	14.466
7	Cen Yu (CHN)	14.100
8	Antoine Borello (FRA)	13.666
