= Swimming at the 2017 Summer Universiade – Men's 800 metre freestyle =

Men's 800 metre freestyle at the 2017 Summer Universiade
- Venue: National Taiwan Sport University Arena
- Location: Taipei, Taiwan
- Dates: 23 August (heats); 24 August (final)
- Competitors: 29 from 21 nations
- Winning time: 7:45.76

Medalists
gold medal	Gregorio Paltrinieri	Italy
silver medal	Mykhailo Romanchuk	Ukraine
bronze medal	Serhiy Frolov	Ukraine

The Men's 800 metre freestyle competition at the 2017 Summer Universiade was held on 23 and 24 August 2017.

== Records ==
Prior to the competition, the existing world and Universiade records were as follows.

World record	Zhang Lin (CHN)	7:32.12	Rome, Italy	29 July 2009
Competition record	Chad La Tourette (USA)	7:47.24	Belgrade, Serbia	7 July 2009

The following new records were set during this competition.

Date	Event	Name	Nationality	Time	Record
24 August	Final	Gregorio Paltrinieri	Italy	7:45.76	UR

== Results ==
=== Heats ===
The heats were held on 23 August at 09:57.

Rank	Heat	Lane	Name	Nationality	Time	Notes
1	3	4	Mykhailo Romanchuk	Ukraine	7:56.51	Q
2	3	3	Gergely Gyurta	Hungary	7:57.88	Q
3	4	3	Jay Lelliott	Great Britain	7:57.95	Q
4	4	4	Gregorio Paltrinieri	Italy	7:57.98	Q
5	4	6	Joris Bouchaut	France	7:58.36	Q
6	4	2	Grant Shoults	United States	7:59.44	Q
7	3	5	Serhiy Frolov	Ukraine	7:59.65	Q
8	3	7	Shingo Nakaya	Japan	7:59.83	Q
9	4	5	Jan Micka	Czech Republic	8:01.57	
10	3	6	Matthew Hutchins	Australia	8:01.84	
11	3	1	Patrick Ransford	United States	8:02.39	
12	4	1	Aleksandr Fedorov	Russia	8:02.62	
13	2	4	Joshua Parrish	Australia	8:03.77	
14	4	8	Ernest Maksumov	Russia	8:04.56	
15	4	7	Domenico Acerenza	Italy	8:07.52	
16	2	1	Huang Guo-ting	Chinese Taipei	8:09.04	NR
17	2	2	Alin Artimon	Romania	8:09.09	
18	3	8	Mathis Castera	France	8:09.27	
19	2	7	Cho Cheng-chi	Chinese Taipei	8:10.57	
20	2	3	Shuhei Suyama	Japan	8:12.06	
21	2	5	Yonatan Batsha	Israel	8:18.57	
22	3	2	Lucas Kanieski	Brazil	8:19.25	
23	2	6	Michael Mincham	New Zealand	8:19.46	
24	2	8	Eetu Piiroinen	Finland	8:28.78	
25	1	5	Christian Mayer Martinelli	Peru	8:40.99	
26	1	4	Ma Rixin	China	8:41.41	
27	1	6	Jux Solita	Philippines	9:01.75	
28	1	3	Cristofer Lanuza	Costa Rica	9:12.73	
29	1	2	Naif Al-Qasmi	Oman	9:47.44	

=== Final ===
The final was held on 24 August at 19:02.

Rank	Lane	Name	Nationality	Time	Notes
1st place, gold medalist(s)	6	Gregorio Paltrinieri	Italy	7:45.76	UR
2nd place, silver medalist(s)	4	Mykhailo Romanchuk	Ukraine	7:46.28	
3rd place, bronze medalist(s)	1	Serhiy Frolov	Ukraine	7:51.06	
4	7	Grant Shoults	United States	7:53.83	
5	3	Jay Lelliott	Great Britain	7:55.36	
6	5	Gergely Gyurta	Hungary	7:58.22	
7	8	Shingo Nakaya	Japan	8:00.69	
8	2	Joris Bouchaut	France	8:00.82	
