= Gymnastics at the 2017 Summer Universiade – Men's artistic individual all-around =

Men's artistic individual all-around at the 2017 Summer Universiade
- Venue: Taipei Nangang Exhibition Center, Hall 1, 4F
- Date: August 22, 2017
- Competitors: 18 from 13 nations

Medalists
gold medal	Oleg Verniaiev	Ukraine
silver medal	Shogo Nonomura	Japan
bronze medal	Wataru Tanigawa	Japan

The Men's artistic individual all-around competition Gymnastics at the 2017 Summer Universiade in Taipei was held on 22 August at the Taipei Nangang Exhibition Center, Hall 1, 4F.

== Schedule ==
All times are Taiwan Standard Time (UTC+08:00)

Date	Time	Event
Tuesday, 22 August 2017	14:00	Final

== Results ==
Rank	Athlete	Floor (gymnastics)	Pommel horse	Rings (gymnastics)	Vault (gymnastics)	Parallel bars	Horizontal bar	Total
1st place, gold medalist(s)	Oleg Verniaiev (UKR)	14.350	14.800	15.000	14.650	15.450	14.050	88.300
2nd place, silver medalist(s)	Shogo Nonomura (JPN)	13.250	14.150	14.950	14.55	15.150	14.000	86.050
3rd place, bronze medalist(s)	Wataru Tanigawa (JPN)	14.550	13.700	14.750	13.600	15.000	14.100	85.700
4	Alexey Rostov (RUS)	13.650	13.600	14.650	14.250	14.350	14.250	84.750
5	Artur Davtyan (ARM)	13.300	14.050	14.950	14.750	13.900	13.200	84.150
6	Yevgen Yudenkov (UKR)	13.900	13.675	14.400	14.100	14.300	13.150	83.525
7	Lee Chih-kai (TPE)	13.700	14.800	12.300	14.100	14.150	13.550	82.600
8	Ahmet Onder (TUR)	12.750	13.200	13.850	14.200	14.550	14.050	82.600
9	Lee Jung-hyo (KOR)	13.400	13.300	14.000	13.850	14.200	13.650	82.400
10	Robert Tvorogal (LTU)	13.550	13.100	13.400	14.000	14.150	13.450	81.650
11	René Cournoyer (CAN)	12.900	12.150	14.050	14.350	13.750	13.650	80.850
12	Robert Neff (USA)	13.400	13.100	13.450	13.950	12.750	14.050	80.700
13	Hsu Ping-chien (TPE)	13.600	13.350	13.750	14.000	12.200	13.700	80.600
14	Baptiste Miette (FRA)	13.300	13.500	13.550	13.650	13.550	13.050	80.600
15	Marios Georgiou (CYP)	13.800	12.150	13.650	14.200	14.150	12.450	80.400
16	Ilya Kibartas (RUS)	13.400	12.025	14.600	13.100	12.400	13.850	79.375
17	Thomas Kuzmickas (LTU)	13.550	11.650	13.000	13.650	13.800	12.650	78.300
18	Milad Karimi (KAZ)	12.150	11.250	13.500	13.700	11.350	13.000	74.950
