= Wataru Tanigawa =

Japanese artistic gymnast

- 谷川航
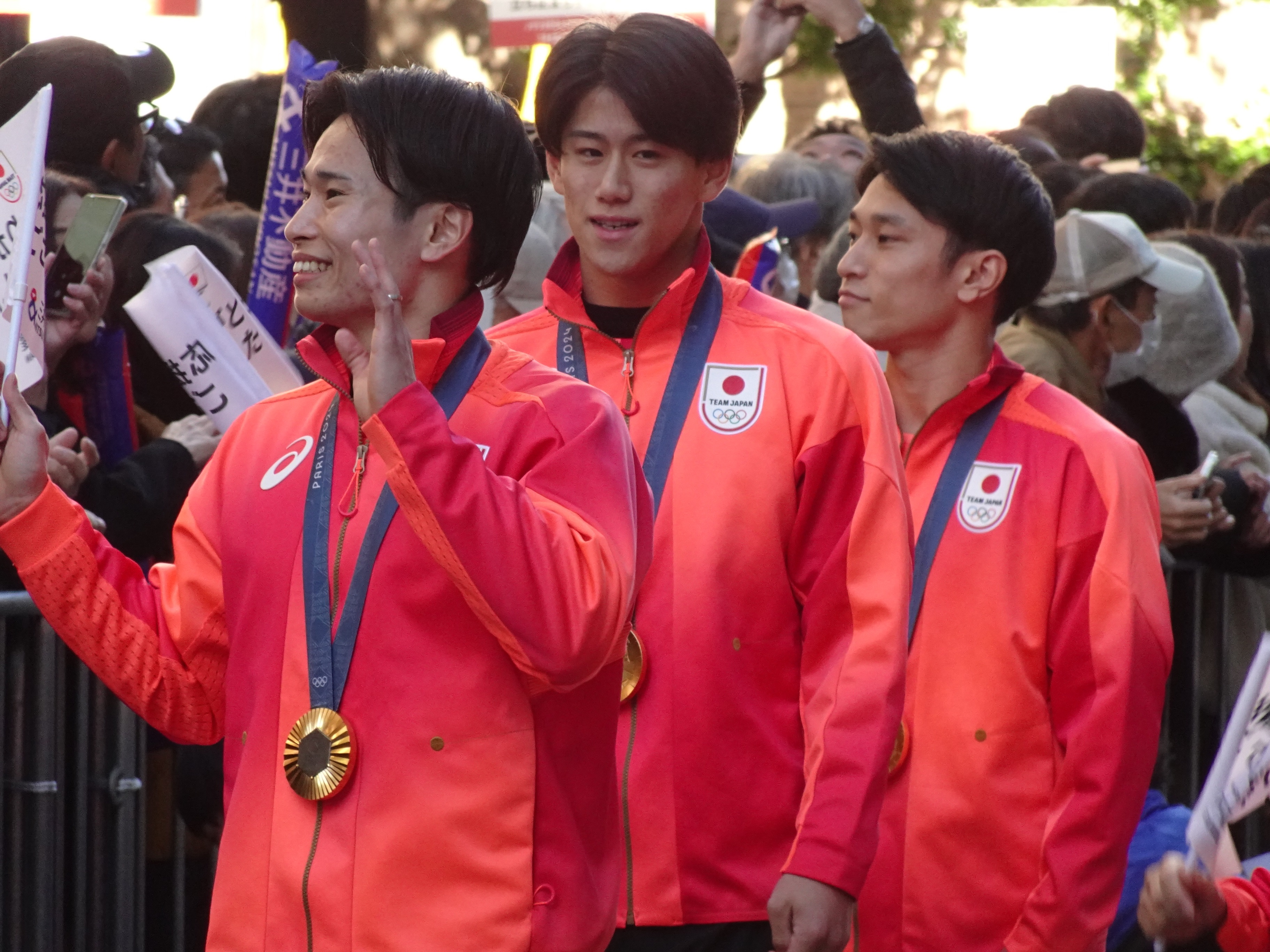
- Tanigawa (right) at Paris 2024 Summer Olympians and Paralympians Japan National Team parade event on November 30, 2024

Personal information
- Born: 23 July 1996 (age 30) Funabashi, Japan
- Height: 1.60 m (5 ft 3 in)

Gymnastics career
- Discipline: Men's artistic gymnastics
- Country represented: Japan
- Club: Central Sports
- Head coaches: Yoshihiro Saito, Hisashi Mizutori
Medal record
Men's artistic gymnastics
Representing Japan
Olympic Games
Gold medal – first place	2024 Paris	Team
Silver medal – second place	2020 Tokyo	Team
World Championships
Silver medal – second place	2022 Liverpool	Team
Bronze medal – third place	2018 Doha	Team
Bronze medal – third place	2019 Stuttgart	Team
Bronze medal – third place	2022 Liverpool	All-around
Asian Games
Gold medal – first place	2022 Hangzhou	Vault
Silver medal – second place	2022 Hangzhou	Team
Bronze medal – third place	2022 Hangzhou	Rings
Asian Championships
Gold medal – first place	2026 Zunyi	Vault
Silver medal – second place	2026 Zunyi	Team
World University Games
Gold medal – first place	2017 Taipei	Team
Gold medal – first place	2019 Naples	Team
Bronze medal – third place	2017 Taipei	All-around
Bronze medal – third place	2017 Taipei	Floor exercise
Bronze medal – third place	2017 Taipei	Parallel bars
Bronze medal – third place	2017 Taipei	Horizontal bar
FIG World Cup
Event	1st	2nd	3rd
All-Around World Cup	0	2	0
Apparatus World Cup	0	0	1
World Challenge Cup	0	2	1
Total	0	4	2

Wataru Tanigawa (谷川航, Tanigawa Wataru; born 23 July 1996) is a Japanese artistic gymnast. He won a gold medal with the Japanese team at the 2024 Summer Olympics and a silver medal at the 2020 Summer Olympics. At the 2022 World Championships, he won a silver medal in the team event and a bronze medal in the all-around. He also won team bronze medals at the 2018 and 2019 World Championships. He is also the 2022 Asian Games vault champion and a two-time World University Games champion.

== Early and personal life ==
Tanigawa started gymnastics at age six at Kenshin Sports Club in Funabashi, Japan. His younger brother, Kakeru, also represents Japan at international gymnastics competitions. He studied sports science at Juntendo University in Tokyo.

== Career ==
Tanigawa won a silver medal on the vault at the 2015 Osijek World Challenge Cup behind Ukraine's Igor Radivilov. Then at the 2016 Anadia World Challenge Cup, Tanigawa won a silver medal on the floor exercise behind Alexander Shatilov and the bronze medal on the vault.

=== 2017 ===
Tanigawa won a bronze medal on the vault at the Melbourne World Cup behind Kenzō Shirai and Christopher Remkes. There, he also placed fourth on the floor exercise, losing the execution score tiebreaker for the bronze medal to Ferhat Arıcan. At the Summer Universiade in Taipei, he won the gold medal in the team event. He also won the bronze medals in four individual events: the all-around, floor exercise, parallel bars and horizontal bar.

Tanigawa competed at the World Championships in Montreal but did not advance to any finals. He was the second reserve for the parallel bars final. After the World Championships, he competed at the Arthur Gander Memorial, finishing sixth in the all-around. He competed at the Swiss Cup, a mixed pairs event, alongside Hitomi Hatakeda, and they won the silver medal behind Switzerland. He then competed at the Toyota International and won a gold medal on the parallel bars, a silver medal on the floor exercise, and a bronze medal on the still rings.

=== 2018 ===
Tanigawa won a silver medal in the all-around at the Tokyo World Cup behind teammate Kenzō Shirai. Then at the All-Japan Championships, he finished seventh in the all-around. He then placed fifth in the all-around at the NHK Trophy. At the All-Japan Event Championships, he won a silver medal on the floor exercise.

Tanigawa was selected to compete at the 2018 World Championships alongside Kazuma Kaya, Kenzō Shirai, Yūsuke Tanaka, and Kōhei Uchimura, with his brother Kakeru being the team alternate. The team won the bronze medal behind China and Russia after multiple falls including from Tanigawa on the floor exercise. After the World Championships, he competed at the All-Japan Team Championships and won a gold medal with his university team. He also competed at the Toyota International, finishing fourth on the still rings.

=== 2019–20 ===
At the 2019 Tokyo World Cup, Tanigawa won a silver medal in the all-around behind American Sam Mikulak. Then at the All-Japan Championships, he finished fifth in the all-around. He then won the silver medal at the NHK Trophy, behind his brother Kakeru. Then at the All-Japan Event Championships, he won the gold medal on the parallel bars and the silver medal on the vault. He won the gold medal in the team event at the Summer Universiade in Naples, Italy.

Tanigawa competed at the 2019 World Championships alongside Daiki Hashimoto, Yuya Kamoto, Kazuma Kaya, and Kakeru Tanigawa, and they won the bronze medal behind Russia and China. After the World Championships, he competed at the All-Japan Team Championships, winning a gold medal with his club team. Then at the Toyota International, he won a silver medal on the still rings.

In November 2020, Tanigawa competed at the Friendship and Solidarity Competition in Tokyo, competing as part of Team Solidarity who won over Team Friendship. Then in December, he competed at the All-Japan Championships and tied for the all-around bronze medal with his brother Kakeru.

=== 2021 ===
Tanigawa won the silver medal in the all-around at the All-Japan Championships behind Daiki Hashimoto. He then won the all-around bronze medal at the NHK Trophy. At the 2020 Summer Olympics, held in 2021 in Tokyo, he competed for Japan, on a team including Hashimoto, Kazuma Kaya, and Takeru Kitazono. The team won the silver medal with a total score of 262.397, 0.103 points behind the Russian Olympic Committee. After the Olympics, he competed at the All-Japan Senior Championships and won a silver medal on the vault. Then at the All-Japan Team Championships, he won a bronze medal with his club team.

=== 2022 ===
Tanigawa finished seventh in the all-around at the All-Japan Championships. He then finished eighth in the all-around at the NHK Trophy. At the All-Japan Event Championships, he finished fourth on the horizontal bar and eighth on the parallel bars.

Tanigawa competed at the World Championships alongside Ryosuke Doi, Daiki Hashimoto, Yuya Kamoto, and Kakeru Tanigawa. In the qualification round, the Japanese team qualified for the team final in first place by nearly eight points, and Tanigawa qualified first in the all-around. They then won the silver medal in the team final by four points behind China. In the all-around final, he won the bronze medal behind Hashimoto and Zhang Boheng. He also qualified for the vault final, finishing in seventh place. After the World Championships, he competed at the All-Japan Team Championships and won a silver medal with his club team.

=== 2023 ===
Tanigawa finished fourth in the all-around at the All-Japan Championships, and he placed seventh at the NHK Trophy. At the All-Japan Event Championships, he finished eighth on the parallel bars. He then competed at the 2022 Asian Games held in 2023 in Hangzhou, China. The Japanese team won the silver medal behind China, and individually, he won gold on the vault and bronze on the still rings. He then competed at the All-Japan Team Championships, winning a bronze medal with his club team.

=== 2024 ===
Tanigawa was selected to represent Japan at the 2024 Summer Olympics in Paris, France, alongside Takaaki Sugino, Shinnosuke Oka, Kazuma Kaya, and Daiki Hashimoto. They won the gold medal in the team final, defeating long-time rival China. Individually, he qualified for the parallel bars final in eighth place, and he finished sixth in the final with a score of 14.133.
