= Gymnastics at the 2017 Summer Universiade =

Gymnastics at the XXIX Summer Universiade
- Venues: Taipei Nangang Exhibition Center
- Dates: August 19, 2017 – August 23, 2017 (artistic); August 27, 2017 – August 29, 2017 (rhythmic)
- Competitors: 275 from 48 nations

Artistic gymnastics was contested at the 2017 Summer Universiade from August 19 to 23, and rhythmic gymnastics was contested from August 27 to 29, both events was held at the Taipei Nangang Exhibition Center in Taipei, Taiwan.

== Combined Medal table ==
| Rank | Nation | Gold | Silver | Bronze | Total |
|---|---|---|---|---|---|
| 1 | Russia | 10 | 6 | 5 | 21 |
| 2 | Japan | 2 | 5 | 7 | 14 |
| 3 | Ukraine | 2 | 5 | 3 | 10 |
| 4 | Canada | 2 | 1 | 2 | 5 |
| 5 | Romania | 2 | 0 | 2 | 4 |
| 6 | Chinese Taipei* | 1 | 2 | 0 | 3 |
| 7 | Armenia | 1 | 0 | 0 | 1 |
| 7 | Dominican Republic | 1 | 0 | 0 | 1 |
| 7 | France | 1 | 0 | 0 | 1 |
| 10 | Germany | 0 | 1 | 0 | 1 |
| 10 | South Korea | 0 | 1 | 0 | 1 |
| 10 | Turkey | 0 | 1 | 0 | 1 |
| 13 | Belarus | 0 | 0 | 2 | 2 |
| 14 | North Korea | 0 | 0 | 1 | 1 |
| Totals (14 entries) | | 22 | 22 | 22 | 66 |

== Medal summary ==
=== Artistic gymnastics ===
==== Men's events ====
| Event | Gold | Silver | Bronze |
|---|---|---|---|
| Team all-around | Japan (JPN); Kenta Chiba; Tomomasa Hasegawa; Yuya Kamoto; Shogo Nonomura; Wataru Tanigawa | Ukraine (UKR); Petro Pakhnyuk; Vladyslav Hryko; Oleg Verniaiev; Yevhen Yudenkov; Ihor Radivilov | Russia (RUS); Daniil Kazachkov; Ilya Kibartas; Vladislav Poliashov; Kirill Prokopev; Alexey Rostov |
| Individual all-around | Oleg Verniaiev; Ukraine | Shogo Nonomura; Japan | Wataru Tanigawa; Japan |
| Floor | Kirill Prokopev; Russia | Kim Han-sol; South Korea | Wataru Tanigawa; Japan |
| Pommel horse | Lee Chih-kai; Chinese Taipei | Oleg Verniaiev; Ukraine | Tomomasa Hasegawa; Japan |
| Rings | Artur Tovmasyan; Armenia | İbrahim Çolak; Turkey | Oleg Verniaiev; Ukraine |
| Vault | Audrys Nin Reyes; Dominican Republic | Oleg Verniaiev; Ukraine | Andrei Muntean; Romania |
| Parallel bars | Shogo Nonomura; Japan | Petro Pakhnyuk; Ukraine | Wataru Tanigawa; Japan |
| Horizontal bar | Axel Augis; France | Vladislav Poliashov; Russia | Wataru Tanigawa; Japan |

==== Women's events ====
| Event | Gold | Silver | Bronze |
|---|---|---|---|
| Team all-around | Russia (RUS); Lilia Akhaimova; Darya Elizarova; Maria Paseka; Evgeniya Shelgunova; Daria Spiridonova | Canada (CAN); Ellie Black; Jessica Dowling; Denelle Pedrick; Brittany Rogers; Briannah Tsang | Japan (JPN); Yumika Nakamura; Natsumi Sasada; Asuka Teramoto; Ayana Tone; Yuki Uchiyama |
| Individual all-around | Larisa Iordache; Romania | Asuka Teramoto; Japan | Ellie Black; Canada |
| Vault | Brittany Rogers; Canada | Lilia Akhaimova; Russia | Maria Paseka; Russia |
| Uneven bars | Daria Spiridonova; Russia | Kim Bùi; Germany | Ellie Black; Canada |
| Balance beam | Ellie Black; Canada | Natsumi Sasada; Japan | Larisa Iordache; Romania |
| Floor | Larisa Iordache; Romania | Asuka Teramoto; Japan | Lilia Akhaimova; Russia |

==== Medal table ====
| Rank | Nation | Gold | Silver | Bronze | Total |
|---|---|---|---|---|---|
| 1 | Russia | 3 | 2 | 3 | 8 |
| 2 | Japan | 2 | 4 | 6 | 12 |
| 3 | Canada | 2 | 1 | 2 | 5 |
| 4 | Romania | 2 | 0 | 2 | 4 |
| 5 | Ukraine | 1 | 4 | 1 | 6 |
| 6 | Armenia | 1 | 0 | 0 | 1 |
| 6 | Chinese Taipei* | 1 | 0 | 0 | 1 |
| 6 | Dominican Republic | 1 | 0 | 0 | 1 |
| 6 | France | 1 | 0 | 0 | 1 |
| 10 | Germany | 0 | 1 | 0 | 1 |
| 10 | South Korea | 0 | 1 | 0 | 1 |
| 10 | Turkey | 0 | 1 | 0 | 1 |
| Totals (12 entries) | | 14 | 14 | 14 | 42 |

=== Rhythmic gymnastics ===
==== Individual ====
| Event | Gold | Silver | Bronze |
|---|---|---|---|
| Individual all-around | Yulia Bravikova; Russia | Ekaterina Selezneva; Russia | Hanna Bazhko; Belarus |
| Individual hoop | Yulia Bravikova; Russia | Ekaterina Selezneva; Russia | Kateryna Lutsenko; Ukraine |
| Individual ball | Ekaterina Selezneva; Russia | Yulia Bravikova; Russia | Mariya Trubach; Belarus |
| Individual clubs | Yulia Bravikova; Russia | Kateryna Lutsenko; Ukraine | Ekaterina Selezneva; Russia |
| Individual ribbon | Yulia Bravikova; Russia | Ekaterina Selezneva; Russia | Takana Tatsuzawa; Japan |

==== Group ====
| Event | Gold | Silver | Bronze |
|---|---|---|---|
| Group all-around | Ukraine (UKR); Maryna Makarova; Valeriia Gudym; Daria Sych; Anastasiya Podrushnyak; Alina Bykhno | Chinese Taipei (TPE); Wang Hsi-Lin; Kung Yun; Yang Chian-mei; Ku Ni-chen; Hsu Tzu-chi; Chen Pei-an | Russia (RUS); Ralina Rakipova; Vera Biryukova; Alexandra Korchagina; Daria Gorbacheva; Elizaveta Minikhina; Valeriya Osikova |
| Group 5 hoops | Russia (RUS); Ralina Rakipova; Vera Biryukova; Alexandra Korchagina; Daria Gorbacheva; Elizaveta Minikhina; Valeriya Osikova | Japan (JPN); Yukari Narimatsu; Asuka Ono; Ayano Sato; Nana Kondo; Nanase Hori; Natsumi Morino | North Korea (PRK); Mun Kyong-wi; Ri Hye-song; Kang Jin-a; Sin Su-rim; Ham Sun-ae |
| Group 3 balls + 2 ropes | Russia (RUS); Ralina Rakipova; Vera Biryukova; Alexandra Korchagina; Daria Gorbacheva; Elizaveta Minikhina; Valeriya Osikova | Chinese Taipei (TPE); Wang Hsi-Lin; Kung Yun; Yang Chian-mei; Ku Ni-chen; Hsu Tzu-chi; Chen Pei-an | Ukraine (UKR); Maryna Makarova; Valeriia Gudym; Daria Sych; Anastasiya Podrushnyak; Alina Bykhno |

==== Medal table ====
| Rank | Nation | Gold | Silver | Bronze | Total |
|---|---|---|---|---|---|
| 1 | Russia | 7 | 4 | 2 | 13 |
| 2 | Ukraine | 1 | 1 | 2 | 4 |
| 3 | Chinese Taipei* | 0 | 2 | 0 | 2 |
| 4 | Japan | 0 | 1 | 1 | 2 |
| 5 | Belarus | 0 | 0 | 2 | 2 |
| 6 | North Korea | 0 | 0 | 1 | 1 |
| Totals (6 entries) | | 8 | 8 | 8 | 24 |
