= Kirill Prokopev =

Russian artistic gymnast

- Full name: Kirill Sergeyevich Prokopev
- Born: 30 January 1994 (age 32) Vladimir, Russia

Gymnastics career
- Discipline: Men's artistic gymnastics
- Country represented: Russia
Medal record
Summer Universiade
Gold medal – first place	2019 Naples	Floor
Gold medal – first place	2017 Taipei	Floor
Bronze medal – third place	2019 Naples	Team
Bronze medal – third place	2017 Taipei	Team

Kirill Sergeyevich Prokopev (Russian: Кирилл Сергеевич Прокопьев; born 30 January 1994) is a Russian artistic gymnast. He is a two-time gold medalist at the Summer Universiade. He won the gold medal in the floor event at the 2017 Summer Universiade and he won the bronze medal in the men's team all-around event. This repeated itself at the 2019 Summer Universiade with gold in the floor event and bronze in the team event.

At the 2012 European Men's Artistic Gymnastics Championships held in Montpellier, France, he won the gold medal in the junior floor event.

In 2020, Prokopev won the silver medal in the floor exercise in Melbourne, Australia as part of the 2020 FIG Artistic Gymnastics World Cup series. He repeated this in the competition held in Baku, Azerbaijan.
