= Shogo Nonomura =

Japanese artistic gymnast

- Born: August 16, 1993 (age 33)

Gymnastics career
- Discipline: Men's artistic gymnastics
- Country represented: Japan; (2014)
Medal record
Representing Japan
World Championships
| Silver medal – second place | 2014 Nanning | Team |
| Bronze medal – third place | 2019 Stuttgart | Team |
Asian Games
| Silver medal – second place | 2018 Jakarta | All-around |
| Silver medal – second place | 2018 Jakarta | Rings |
| Silver medal – second place | 2018 Jakarta | Team |
Universiade
| Gold medal – first place | 2017 Taipei | Parallel bars |
| Gold medal – first place | 2017 Taipei | Team |
| Silver medal – second place | 2017 Taipei | All-around |

Shogo Nonomura (野々村 笙吾, Nonomura Shōgo; born 16 August 1993) is a Japanese male artistic gymnast and part of the national team. At the 2013 Summer Universiade in Kazan, Nonomura won the team all-around bronze medal (with Yusuke Tanaka, Hiroki Ishikawa, Ryōhei Katō and Chihiro Yoshioka). He participated at the 2014 World Artistic Gymnastics Championships in Nanning, China. He won the team all-around gold medal at the 2017 Summer Universiade. Nonomura won the gold medal in the men's all-around competition at the 2018 FIG Artistic Gymnastics World Cup Series in Birmingham, UK in March, 2018.
