= Yevhen Yudenkov =

Ukrainian gymnast (born 1993)

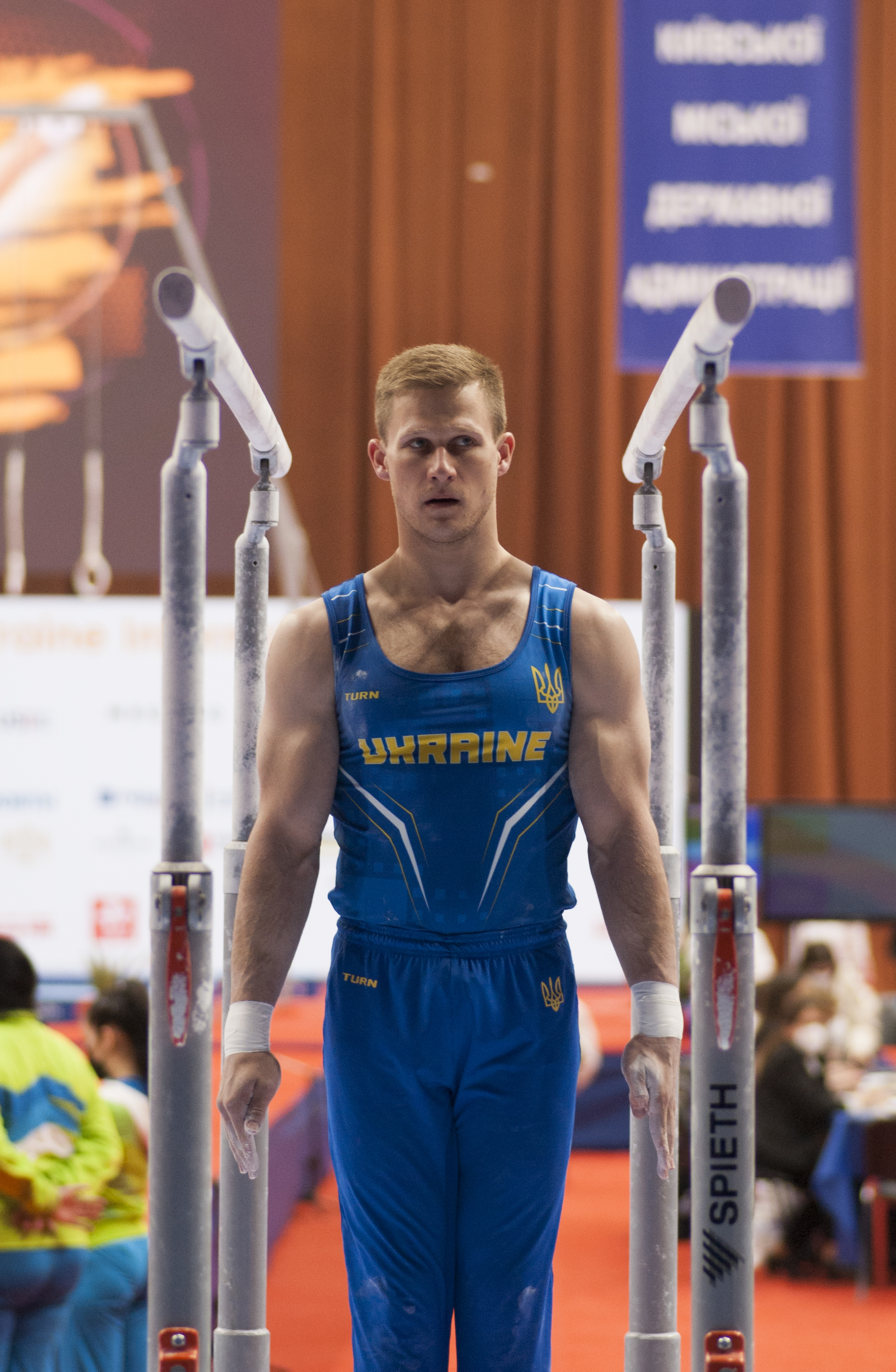
- Yudenkov in 2021

Personal information
- Full name: Yevhen Viktorovych Yudenkov
- Alternative name: Yevgen Yudenkov
- Nickname: Zhenya
- Born: 10 April 1993 (age 33) Donetsk, Ukraine
- Height: 172 cm (5 ft 8 in)

Gymnastics career
- Discipline: Men's artistic gymnastics
- Country represented: Ukraine
- Head coach: Andriy Khrustaliov
Medal record
Representing Ukraine
European Championships
Gold medal – first place	2020 Mersin	Team
Summer Universiade
Silver medal – second place	2017 Taipei	Team

Yevhen Viktorovych Yudenkov (Ukrainian: Євген Вікторович Юденков; born 10 April 1993) is a Ukrainian artistic gymnast. He represented Ukraine at the 2020 Summer Olympics and won a gold medal in the team event at the 2020 European Championships.

== Gymnastics career ==
At the 2016 Ljubljana World Challenge Cup, Yudenkov won silver medals on both the still rings and the parallel bars. He began the 2017 season with a bronze medal on the still rings at the Baku World Cup. He advanced to the all-around final at the 2017 European Championships and finished 15th. He then won a silver medal with the Ukrainian team at the 2017 Summer Universiade. Individually, he finished sixth in the all-around final and eighth in the parallel bars final. He then won a bronze medal on the still rings at the Szombathely World Challenge Cup.

Yudenkov missed the 2018 European Championships, and the majority of the 2018 season, due to shoulder surgery. He competed in the all-around final at the 2019 European Championships and finished 19th. At the 2019 World Championships, he helped Ukraine finish eighth in the team final and qualify for the 2020 Summer Olympics.

Yudenkov became a European champion in the team competition at the 2020 European Championships in Mersin, Turkey. Additionally, he placed fifth in the pommel horse and still rings finals. At the 2020 Szombathely World Challenge Cup, he won bronze medals on the still rings and parallel bars.

Yudenkov was selected to represent Ukraine at the 2020 Summer Olympics alongside Illia Kovtun, Igor Radivilov, and Petro Pakhnyuk, and they finished seventh in the team final.

Yudenkov left Ukraine in April 2022 due to the Russian invasion and began training in Vélizy-Villacoublay, France.
