= Alina Bykhno =

Ukrainian rhythmic gymnast

- Height: 176 cm (5 ft 9 in)

Gymnastics career
- Discipline: Rhythmic gymnastics
- Country represented: Ukraine
- Club: Deriugina School
- Head coach: Irina Deriugina
- Retired: yes
Medal record
European Games
Silver medal – second place	2019 Minsk	3 Hoops and 4 Clubs
European Championships
Silver medal – second place	2018 Guadalajara	Team
Silver medal – second place	2018 Guadalajara	5 Hoops
Summer Universiade
Gold medal – first place	2017 Taipei	Group all-around
Bronze medal – third place	2017 Taipei	3 Balls and 2 Ropes

Alina Bykhno (Ukrainian: Аліна Олегівна Бихно) is a Ukrainian female rhythmic gymnast and British model. She was a member of Ukrainian rhythmic gymnastics national team. She won gold and bronze medals at the 2017 Summer Universiade At the 2018 Rhythmic Gymnastics European Championships in Guadalajara she won two silver medals in team events.
