= Valeriia Gudym =

Ukrainian rhythmic gymnast (born 1995)

- Full name: Valeriia Vasylivna Gudym
- Alternative name: Valeriya Vasylivna Hudym
- Born: 1 March 1995 (age 31) Kyiv, Ukraine

Gymnastics career
- Discipline: Rhythmic gymnastics
- Country represented: Ukraine; (2014)
Medal record
Representing Ukraine
Group rhythmic gymnastics
World Championships
Bronze medal – third place	2013 Kyiv	Group 10 clubs
European Games
Silver medal – second place	2015 Baku	Group 5 ribbons
Bronze medal – third place	2015 Baku	Group 6 clubs/2 hoops
Summer Universiade
Gold medal – first place	2017 Taipei	Group all-around
Gold medal – first place	2015 Gwangju	Group 6 clubs/2 hoops
Silver medal – second place	2015 Gwangju	Group all-around
Silver medal – second place	2015 Gwangju	Group 5 ribbons
Silver medal – second place	2013 Kazan	Group all-around
Bronze medal – third place	2013 Kazan	Group 10 clubs
Bronze medal – third place	2013 Kazan	Group 2 ribbons/3 balls
Bronze medal – third place	2017 Taipei	Group 3 balls/2 ropes

Valeriia Vasylivna Gudym (Ukrainian: Валерія Василівна Гудим; born 1 March 1995) is a Ukrainian group rhythmic gymnast. She represents her nation at international competitions.

Gudym participated at the 2012 Summer Olympics. She also competed at world championships, including at the 2014 World Rhythmic Gymnastics Championships. At the 2015 European Games in Baku she won a silver medal in the group ribbons event and a bronze medal in the group clubs and hoops event.
