= Petro Pakhnyuk =

Ukrainian artistic gymnast (born 1991)

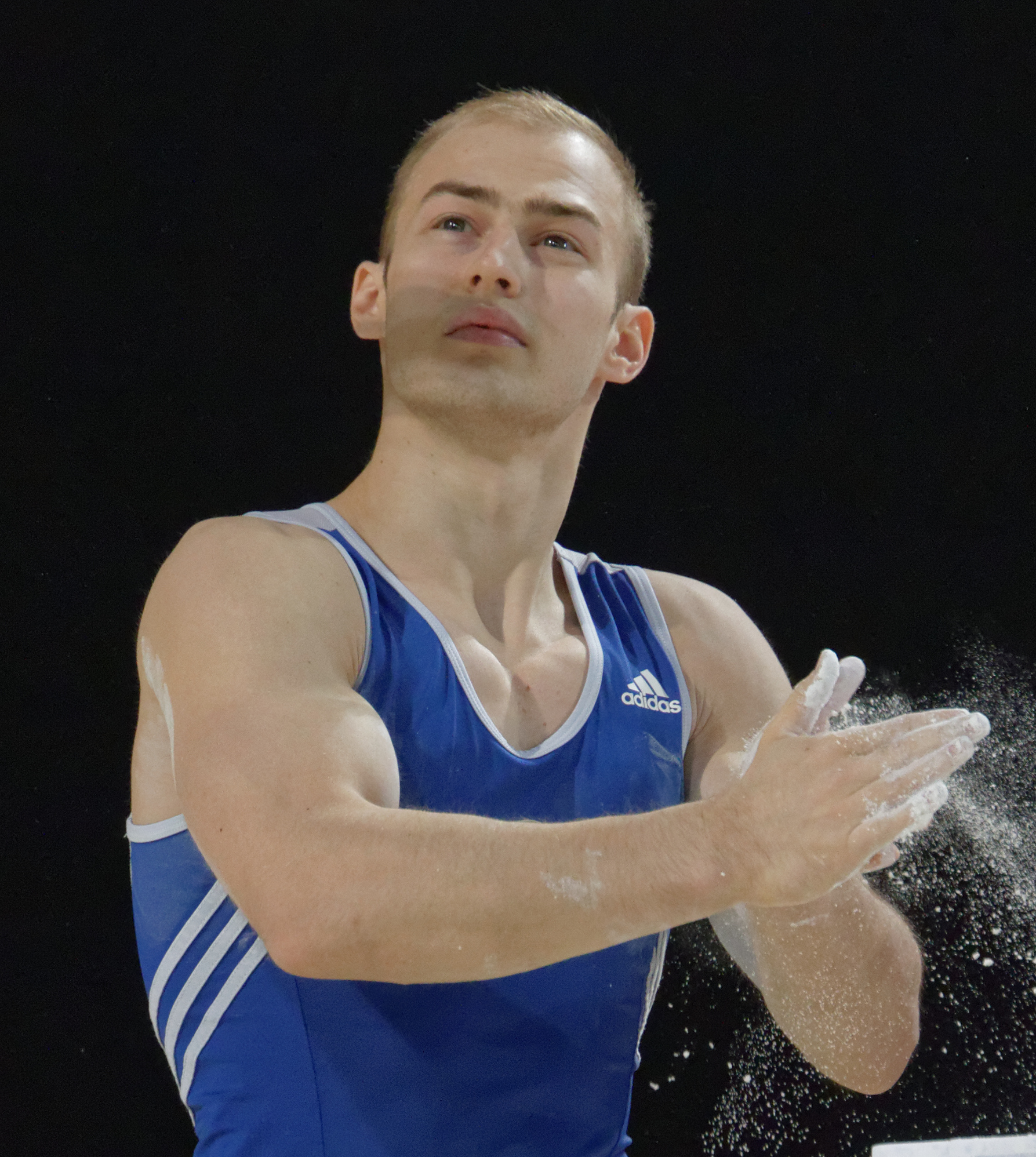
- Pakhnyuk at the 2015 European Championships

Personal information
- Full name: Petro Volodymyrovych Pakhnyuk
- Nickname: Petia
- Born: 26 November 1991 (age 34) Kyiv, Ukrainian SSR
- Height: 1.73 m (5 ft 8 in)

Gymnastics career
- Discipline: Men's artistic gymnastics
- Country represented: Ukraine; (2008–2013; 2017–2022)
- Former countries represented: Azerbaijan (2014–2016)
- Head coach: Vyacheslav Lavrukhin
Medal record
Men's artistic gymnastics
Representing Ukraine
European Games
Bronze medal – third place	2019 Minsk	Floor exercise
European Championships
Gold medal – first place	2020 Mersin	Team
Silver medal – second place	2019 Szczecin	Parallel bars
Silver medal – second place	2020 Mersin	Parallel bars
Summer Universiade
Silver medal – second place	2013 Kazan	Team
Silver medal – second place	2017 Taipei	Team
Silver medal – second place	2017 Taipei	Parallel bars
Representing Azerbaijan
European Games
Bronze medal – third place	2015 Baku	Team

Petro Volodymyrovych Pakhnyuk (Ukrainian: Петро Володимирович Пахнюк, also spelled Pakhniuk, born 26 November 1991 in Kyiv) is a Ukrainian artistic gymnast who also represented Azerbaijan in international competitions. He helped Azerbaijan win a bronze medal in the team event at the 2015 European Games. While competing for Ukraine, he won a bronze medal on the floor exercise at the 2019 European Games, and he won a team gold medal at the 2020 European Championships. He is also the 2019 European and 2017 World University Games parallel bars silver medalist. He represented Azerbaijan at the 2016 Summer Olympics and Ukraine at the 2020 Summer Olympics.

== Gymnastics career ==
Pakhnyuk began gymnastics at the age of 10.

=== 2008–2013: Ukraine ===
Pakhnyuk competed at the 2008 Junior European Championships and placed fifth in the pommel horse final. His first major senior international competition was the 2012 European Championships, and he helped Ukraine place fifth. He then represented Ukraine at the 2013 Summer Universiade and helped the team win the silver medal to Russia.

=== 2014–2016: Azerbaijan ===
In March 2014, Pakhnyuk left the Ukrainian team and began competing for Azerbaijan. He was recruited to join Azerbaijan as they were building a gymnastics program for the upcoming 2015 European Games in Baku. His first major competition for Azerbaijan was the 2014 World Championships, where he finished 15th in the all-around final.

At the 2015 European Championships, Pakhnyuk finished ninth in the all-around final and sixth in the parallel bars final. He then represented Azerbaijan at the 2015 European Games alongside Eldar Safarov and Oleg Stepko, and they won the bronze medal in the team competition.

Pakhnyuk finished 20th in the all-around at the 2016 Olympic Test Event and earned a berth to the 2016 Summer Olympics. There, he finished 34th in the all-around qualifications and did not advance into any of the finals.

=== 2017–2022: Back to Ukraine ===
Pakhnyuk decided to rejoin the Ukrainian team in 2017. His first competition back with Ukraine was the 2017 Summer Universiade, and he helped Ukraine win the team silver medal. He also won a silver medal on the parallel bars to Japan's Shogo Nonomura. At the 2017 Varna World Challenge Cup, he won the parallel bars title and also won a silver medal on the floor exercise. Then at the Paris World Challenge Cup, he won silver medals on the floor exercise and parallel bars.

Pakhnyuk won the all-around bronze medal at the 2018 American Cup. He then injured his leg while competing at the Stuttgart World Cup. He returned to competition at the 2018 European Championships, but he could not compete on all six apparatuses. He won the gold medal on the parallel bars at the 2018 Szombathely World Challenge Cup.

At the 2019 American Cup, Pakhnyuk placed fourth in the all-around. He then won the all-around bronze medal at the Stuttgart World Cup. At the 2019 European Championships, he finished sixth in the all-around final and won a silver medal on the parallel bars. He then won the floor exercise bronze medal at the 2019 European Games, and he placed fourth in the all-around. At the Szombathely World Challenge Cup, he won silver medals on the parallel bars and horizontal bar and a bronze medal on the floor exercise.

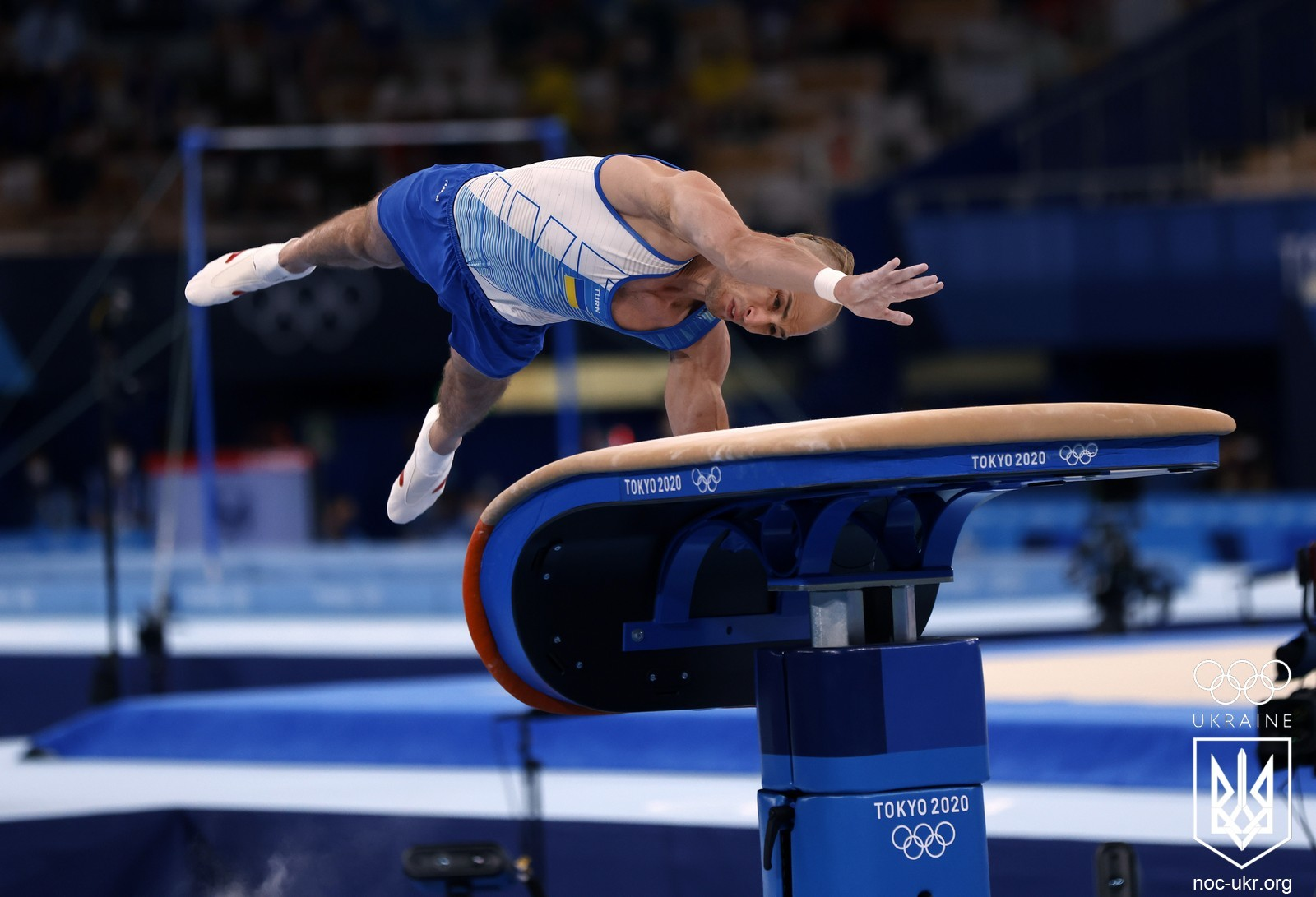
Pakhnyuk vaulting at the 2020 Summer Olympics

Pakhnyuk helped Ukraine win the team title at the 2020 European Championships, and he won the silver medal on the parallel bars. He injured his tricep at the 2021 European Championships and had to withdraw from the event. He returned in time to represent Ukraine at the 2020 Summer Olympics alongside Illia Kovtun, Igor Radivilov, and Yevhen Yudenkov, and they finished seventh in the team final. Individually, he advanced into the all-around final and finished 19th. He also advanced into the parallel bars final and finished sixth.

Pakhnyuk won a gold medal on the parallel bars and a silver medal on the pommel horse at the 2022 Koper World Challenge Cup. He left the Ukrainian national team at the end of the 2022 season due to a conflict with the new head coach after not being selected to the 2022 World Championships team.

== Eponymous skills ==
At the 2020 Szombathely World Challenge Cup, Pakhnyuk debuted two new skills on the parallel bars, one in the qualification round and the other in the event final, which were then named after him in the Code of Points.

Apparatus	Name	Description	Difficulty (Note: Valid for the 2025–2028 Code of Points)	Added to Code of Points
Parallel bars	Pakhniuk	Backward uprise and 5/4 salto forward straddled to upper arm hang	E (0.5)	2020 Szombathely World Challenge Cup
Parallel bars	Pakhniuk II	Backward uprise and 5/4 salto forward straddled to hang	F (0.6)	2020 Szombathely World Challenge Cup

== Personal life ==
In 2017, Pakhnyuk married Azerbaijani former rhythmic gymnast Aynur Jabbarli. Their first son, Demid, was born in 2019.

== See also ==
- Nationality changes in gymnastics
