= Roller Sports at the 2017 Summer Universiade – Women's 500 metres sprint =

Women's 500 metres sprint at the XXIX Summer Universiade
- Venues: Yingfeng Riverside Park Roller Sports Rink (A)
- Dates: 23 August
- Competitors: 20 from 12 nations

Medalists
| 1st place, gold medalist(s) | | Chen Ying-chu | Chinese Taipei |
| 2nd place, silver medalist(s) | | María Fernanda Timms | Colombia |
| 3rd place, bronze medalist(s) | | Yang Ho-chen | Chinese Taipei |

The women's 500 metres sprint event at the 2017 Summer Universiade was held on 23 August at the Yingfeng Riverside Park Roller Sports Rink (A).

== Record ==
| Category | Athlete | Record | Date | Place |
|---|---|---|---|---|
| World record | (Colombia) Hellen Montoya | 43.247 | 17 November 2015 | Kaoshiung, Taiwan |

== Results ==
| Qualified for the next phase |

=== Preliminary Round ===
| Rank | Heat | Athlete | Time | Results |
|---|---|---|---|---|
| 1 | 2 | Chen Ying-chu (TPE) | 43.205 | Q |
| 2 | 3 | Shin So-yeong (KOR) | 43.272 | Q |
| 3 | 3 | Katharina Isabe Rumpus (GER) | 43.366 | Q |
| 4 | 3 | Mayerly Amaya Villamizar (COL) | 43.514 | |
| 5 | 2 | Benedetta Rossini (ITA) | 43.863 | Q |
| 6 | 2 | Carlotta Camarin (ITA) | 44.207 | |
| 7 | 1 | An Yi-seul (KOR) | 44.523 | Q |
| 8 | 3 | Rina Jasmin Von Burg (SUI) | 45.281 | |
| 9 | 4 | Yang Ho-chen (TPE) | 45.299 | Q |
| 10 | 4 | María Fernanda Timms (COL) | 45.369 | Q |
| 11 | 1 | Wong Vanessa Natalie (HKG) | 45.474 | Q |
| 12 | 1 | Yuri Yoshino (JPN) | 45.516 | |
| 13 | 4 | Eleonora Kopilovic (HUN) | 45.927 | |
| 14 | 4 | Kira Yasutaka (JPN) | 46.181 | |
| 15 | 2 | Blanka Santha (HUN) | 47.367 | |
| 16 | 3 | Jana Linda Von Burg (SUI) | 47.990 | |
| 17 | 1 | Daria Gorbatenko (RUS) | 49.807 | |
| 18 | 1 | Elena Trandafilova (RUS) | 52.859 | |
| 19 | 4 | Lotte Kaars (NZL) | DNS | |
| 20 | 2 | Tadeja Donka (SLO) | DNS | |

=== Semifinal ===
| Rank | Heat | Athlete | Time | Results |
|---|---|---|---|---|
| 1 | 2 | Chen Ying-chu (TPE) | 43.052 | Q |
| 2 | 2 | Shin So-yeong (KOR) | 43.683 | Q |
| 3 | 1 | Yang Ho-chen (TPE) | 44.320 | Q |
| 4 | 2 | Katharina Isabe Rumpus (GER) | 44.347 | |
| 5 | 2 | Benedetta Rossini (ITA) | 44.412 | |
| 6 | 1 | María Fernanda Timms (COL) | 44.418 | Q |
| 7 | 1 | An Yi-seul (KOR) | 44.456 | |
| 8 | 1 | Wong Vanessa Natalie (HKG) | 45.332 | |

=== Final ===
| Rank | Athlete | Results |
|---|---|---|
| 1st place, gold medalist(s) | Chen Ying-chu (TPE) | 43.739 |
| 2nd place, silver medalist(s) | María Fernanda Timms (COL) | 43.802 |
| 3rd place, bronze medalist(s) | Yang Ho-chen (TPE) | 52.462 |
| 4 | Shin So-yeong (KOR) | 53.249 |
