= Roller Sports at the 2017 Summer Universiade – Men's 500 metres sprint =

Men's 500 metres sprint at the XXIX Summer Universiade
- Venues: Yingfeng Riverside Park Roller Sports Rink (A)
- Dates: 23 August
- Competitors: 22 from 13 nations

Medalists
1st place, gold medalist(s)		Hong Seung-gi	South Korea
2nd place, silver medalist(s)		Cesar Enrique Nunez Almanze	Colombia
3rd place, bronze medalist(s)		Jaime Rodrigo Uribe Mogollon	Colombia

The men's 500 metres sprint event at the 2017 Summer Universiade was held on 23 August at the Yingfeng Riverside Park Roller Sports Rink (A).

== Record ==
Category	Athlete	Record	Date	Place
World record	(Colombia) Edwin Estrada	39.931	17 November 2015	Kaoshiung, Taiwan

== Results ==
Qualified for the next phase

=== Preliminary Round ===
Rank	Heat	Athlete	Time	Results
1	2	Huang Yu-lin (TPE)	40.226	Q
2	2	Matej Pravda (CZE)	40.457	Q
3	2	Cristian Sartorato (ITA)	40.540	
4	3	Jaime Rodrigo Uribe Mogollon (COL)	40.563	Q
5	3	Hong Seung-gi (KOR)	40.748	Q
6	1	Kim Jin-young (KOR)	40.863	Q
7	3	Thomas Petutschnigg (AUT)	40.884	
8	3	Fabian Istvan Dieterle (HUN)	40.974	
9	1	Mattia Diamanti (ITA)	41.004	Q
10	1	Etienne Kris Ramali (GER)	41.244	Q
11	4	Cesar Enrique Nunez Almanze (COL)	41.838	Q
12	4	Sung Ching-yang (TPE)	41.990	Q
13	3	Nils Fischer (GER)	42.252	
14	4	Tempei Zama (JPN)	42.297	
15	4	Katsuki Kato (JPN)	42.386	
16	4	Christian Kromoser (AUT)	42.675	
17	4	Ben Jesper Sorg (SUI)	43.088	
18	2	Michal Prokop (CZE)	44.601	
19	1	Miha Remic (SLO)	44.707	
20	1	Sergey Fokin (RUS)	44.932	
21	2	Kiriil Vinokurov (RUS)	49.782	
	3	Anton Kapustsin (BLR)	DNS	

=== Semifinal ===
Rank	Heat	Athlete	Time	Results
1	1	Cesar Enrique Nunez Almanze (COL)	40.049	Q
2	1	Sung Ching-yang (TPE)	40.052	Q
3	1	Kim Jin-young (KOR)	40.059	
4	2	Jaime Rodrigo Uribe Mogollon (COL)	41.354	Q
5	2	Hong Seung-gi (KOR)	41.408	Q
6	1	Etienne Kris Ramali (GER)	41.492	
7	1	Mattia Diamanti (ITA)	41.539	
8	2	Matej Pravda (CZE)	41.653	
9	2	Huang Yu-lin (TPE)	DSQ	

=== Final ===
Rank	Athlete	Results
1st place, gold medalist(s)	Hong Seung-gi (KOR)	39.936
2nd place, silver medalist(s)	Cesar Enrique Nunez Almanze (COL)	39.959
3rd place, bronze medalist(s)	Jaime Rodrigo Uribe Mogollon (COL)	40.033
4	Sung Ching-yang (TPE)	40.248
