= Badminton at the 2017 Summer Universiade – Mixed doubles =

Mixed doubles at the 2017 Summer Universiade
- Venue: Taipei Gymnasium
- Location: Taipei, Taiwan
- Dates: 27–29 August 2017
- Competitors: 110 from 25 nations

Medalists
gold medal	Wang Chi-lin; Lee Chia-hsin	Chinese Taipei
silver medal	Nur Mohd Azriyn Ayub; Goh Yea Ching	Malaysia
bronze medal	Rodion Alimov; Alina Davletova	Russia
bronze medal	Lee Yang; Hsu Ya-ching	Chinese Taipei

The mixed doubles badminton event at the 2017 Summer Universiade was held from August 27 to 29 at the Taipei Gymnasium in Taipei, Taiwan.

== Draw ==
=== Finals ===
Quarterfinals
Wang Chi-lin (TPE); Lee Chia-hsin (TPE)	21	21
Johannes Pistorius (GER); Linda Efler (GER)	13	6
Rodion Alimov (RUS); Alina Davletova (RUS)	27	21
Tinn Isriyanet (THA); Phataimas Muenwong (THA)	25	19
Yang Po-hsuan (TPE); Wen Hao-yun (TPE)	14	16
Nur Mohd Azriyn Ayub (MAS); Goh Yea Ching (MAS)	21	21
Agripina Prima Rahmanto (INA); Masita Mahmudin (INA)	26	17
Lee Yang (TPE); Hsu Ya-ching (TPE)	21	21

Semifinals
Wang Chi-lin (TPE); Lee Chia-hsin (TPE)	21	21
Rodion Alimov (RUS); Alina Davletova (RUS)	14	13
Nur Mohd Azriyn Ayub (MAS); Goh Yea Ching (MAS)	21	21
Lee Yang (TPE); Hsu Ya-ching (TPE)	14	16

Final
Wang Chi-lin (TPE); Lee Chia-hsin (TPE)	12	21	21
Nur Mohd Azriyn Ayub (MAS); Goh Yea Ching (MAS)	21	16	14

=== Top half ===
==== Section 1 ====
Round of 64
Wang C-l (TPE); Lee C-h (TPE)
Bye
K Tamate (JPN); M Kato (JPN)	21	21
M Gangloff (FRA); V Faulmann (FRA)	11	13
D Bohara (NEP); A Giri (NEP)
Bye
P Flis (SLO); K Stankovic (SLO)	16	16
K Jakowczuk (POL); K A Marczak (POL)	21	21

Round of 32
Wang C-l (TPE); Lee C-h (TPE)	21	21
K Tamate (JPN); M Kato (JPN)	9	16
D Bohara (NEP); A Giri (NEP)	11	6
K Jakowczuk (POL); K A Marczak (POL)	21	21

Round of 16
Wang C-l (TPE); Lee C-h (TPE)	21	21
K Jakowczuk (POL); K A Marczak (POL)	11	15

==== Section 2 ====
Round of 64
J Pistorius (GER); L Efler (GER)
Bye
I Pavlović (SRB); M Simić (SRB)	21	21
M F Kaart (EST); S-L Moora (EST)	9	16
E Voung (AUS); C D Lam (AUS)	14	21	21
Koh J Y (SGP); Kelly Tan J L (SGP)	21	13	16
R Haramel Jr. (PHI); C Garin (PHI)	21	21
A La (USA); Victoria Chen L (USA)	19	18

Round of 32
J Pistorius (GER); L Efler (GER)	21	21
I Pavlović (SRB); M Simić (SRB)	12	12
E Voung (AUS); C D Lam (AUS)	10	24	21
R Haramel Jr. (PHI); C Garin (PHI)	21	22	17

Round of 16
J Pistorius (GER); L Efler (GER)	21	21
E Voung (AUS); C D Lam (AUS)	10	9

==== Section 3 ====
Round of 64
R Alimov (RUS); A Davletova (RUS)
Bye
Jonathan T B Lai (CAN); M Tong (CAN)	21	21
A T Fapohunda (NGR); N A Oyinloye (NGR)	5	8
Kim J-h (KOR); Lee S-h (KOR)	21	21
P R Weerashriya (SRI); O P. Kuruppu (SRI)	8	4
K Mitsuhashi (JPN); R Miyaura (JPN)	21	21
Tang H K (HKG); Tang H L (HKG)	13	11

Round of 32
R Alimov (RUS); A Davletova (RUS)	21	21
Jonathan T B Lai (CAN); M Tong (CAN)	15	11
Kim J-h (KOR); Lee S-h (KOR)	11	21	21
K Mitsuhashi (JPN); R Miyaura (JPN)	21	16	19

Round of 16
R Alimov (RUS); A Davletova (RUS)	21	21
Kim J-h (KOR); Lee S-h (KOR)	10	18

==== Section 4 ====
Round of 64
R Dhanriano (INA); D A Surya (INA)
Bye
P Lundqvist (SWE); I S Aslan (SWE)	19	16
K Schäfer (GER); Y Li (GER)	21	21
M S Mohd Ismail (MAS); D Siow H S (MAS)	21	21
Lucas Wee Z X (SGP); Fiona Seah J F (SGP)	10	15
H Makkar (IND); K Kanwal (IND)	11	14
T Isriyanet (THA); P Muenwong (THA)	21	21

Round of 32
R Dhanriano (INA); D A Surya (INA)	15	18
K Schäfer (GER); Y Li (GER)	21	21
M S Mohd Ismail (MAS); D Siow H S (MAS)	10	18
T Isriyanet (THA); P Muenwong (THA)	21	21

Round of 16
K Schäfer (GER); Y Li (GER)	21	11	15
T Isriyanet (THA); P Muenwong (THA)	18	21	21

=== Bottom half ===
==== Section 5 ====
Round of 64
D Yang (USA); A Lin (USA)	14	17
T Baures (FRA); V Hériau (FRA)	21	21
P Giguere (CAN); A-J Beaulieu (CAN)	17	12
D Hess (GER); E Janssens (GER)	21	21
S Bergström (SWE); L Eriksson (SWE)	12	12
Seo S-j (KOR); Park M-j (KOR)	21	21
Bye
Yang P-h (TPE); Wen H-y (TPE)

Round of 32
T Baures (FRA); V Hériau (FRA)	19	21	21
D Hess (GER); E Janssens (GER)	21	16	11
Seo S-j (KOR); Park M-j (KOR)	21	18	13
Yang P-h (TPE); Wen H-y (TPE)	8	21	21

Round of 16
T Baures (FRA); V Hériau (FRA)	23	5
Yang P-h (TPE); Wen H-y (TPE)	25	21

==== Section 6 ====
Round of 64
R Kargaev (RUS); E Bolotova (RUS)	21	21
S Sauk (EST); K Lattik (EST)	14	11
A Nair (RSA); L A T De Wet (RSA)	5	6
N M A Ayub (MAS); Goh Y C (MAS)	21	21
D Fan (AUS); S Fan (AUS)	19	21	10
M Šemrov (SLO); J Bajuk (SLO)	21	17	21
Bye
P Thongnum (THA); N Saengchote (THA)

Round of 32
R Kargaev (RUS); E Bolotova (RUS)	19	19
N M A Ayub (MAS); Goh Y C (MAS)	21	21
M Šemrov (SLO); J Bajuk (SLO)	12	9
P Thongnum (THA); N Saengchote (THA)	21	21

Round of 16
N M A Ayub (MAS); Goh Y C (MAS)	21	21
P Thongnum (THA); N Saengchote (THA)	14	10

==== Section 7 ====
Round of 64
S Vighnesh (SGP); Lim S X (SGP)	14	11
J Singh (MAS); Yap R C (MAS)	21	21
T A Lindeman (CAN); J Wu (CAN)	13	13
A Prima Rahmanto (INA); M Mahmudin (INA)	21	21
P Szydłowski (POL); M Witek (POL)	21	19	21
J Pechera (PHI); G Chavez (PHI)	15	21	17
Bye
V Kuznetsov (RUS); K Evgenova (RUS)

Round of 32
J Singh (MAS); Yap R C (MAS)	12	15
A Prima Rahmanto (INA); M Mahmudin (INA)	21	21
P Szydłowski (POL); M Witek (POL)	21	21
V Kuznetsov (RUS); K Evgenova (RUS)	15	18

Round of 16
A Prima Rahmanto (INA); M Mahmudin (INA)	21	21
P Szydłowski (POL); M Witek (POL)	16	11

==== Section 8 ====
Round of 64
G R Garikapati (IND); H Veludurthi (IND)	15	12
S Kawabata (JPN); R Katamata (JPN)	21	21
Park K-h (KOR); Ji J-b (KOR)	21	18	17
Chang Y C (HKG); Yuen S Y (HKG)	18	21	21
J Ma (USA); M Sporkert (USA)	21	21
C Manmel Wadu (SRI); L S Lanka Geeganage (SRI)	13	8
Bye
Lee Y (TPE); Hsu Y-c (TPE)

Round of 32
S Kawabata (JPN); R Katamata (JPN)	10	18
Chang Y C (HKG); Yuen S Y (HKG)	21	21
J Ma (USA); M Sporkert (USA)	5	7
Lee Y (TPE); Hsu Y-c (TPE)	21	21

Round of 16
Chang Y C (HKG); Yuen S Y (HKG)	13	15
Lee Y (TPE); Hsu Y-c (TPE)	21	21
