= 2018 Uber Cup qualification =

Tournament details
- Dates: 6 – 18 February 2018
- Venue: BA: Stadium Sultan Abdul Halim; BCA: Hacène Harcha Arena; BE: Kazan Gymnastics Centre; BO: Eastlink Badminton Stadium; BPA: National Racquet Centre
- Location: BA: Alor Setar, Malaysia; BCA: Algiers, Algeria; BE: Kazan, Russia; BO: Hamilton, New Zealand; BPA: Tacarigua, Trinidad & Tobago

The 2018 Uber Cup qualification process is a series of tournaments organised by the five BWF confederations to decide 14 of the 16 teams which will play in the 2018 Uber Cup, with Thailand qualifying automatically as hosts, and China qualifying automatically as trophy holder.

== Qualified teams ==
Country	Confederation	Qualified as	Qualified on	World Team Rankings	Final appearance
Thailand	Badminton Asia	Host country	18 March 2017	4th	6th
China	Badminton Asia	2016 Uber Cup winner	22 May 2016	2nd	18th
Australia	Badminton Oceania	2018 Oceania Team Championships winner	7 February 2018	19th	8th
Indonesia	Badminton Asia	2018 Asia Team Championships semifinalists	9 February 2018	8th	24th
Japan	Badminton Asia	2018 Asia Team Championships semifinalists	9 February 2018	1st	24th
South Korea	Badminton Asia	2018 Asia Team Championships semifinalists	9 February 2018	3rd	18th
Mauritius	Badminton Africa	2018 All Africa Team Championships winner	15 February 2018	36th	2nd
Denmark	Badminton Europe	2018 European Team Championships semifinalists	16 February 2018	7th	20th
Germany	Badminton Europe	2018 European Team Championships semifinalists	16 February 2018	13th	9th
Russia	Badminton Europe	2018 European Team Championships semifinalists	16 February 2018	12th	5th
Spain	Badminton Europe	2018 European Team Championships semifinalists	16 February 2018	10th	2nd
Canada	Badminton Pan Am	2018 Pan Am Team Championships winner	18 February 2018	14th	11th
Chinese Taipei	Badminton Asia	Best ranking (Asia)^{1}	22 February 2018	5th	6th
India	Badminton Asia	Best ranking (overall)	18 February 2018	6th	6th
Malaysia	Badminton Asia	Best ranking (overall)	18 February 2018	9th	12th
Hong Kong	Badminton Asia	Best ranking (overall)	18 February 2018	11th	8th

- ^1 Since China, one of the semifinalists for Asian qualification tournament had already qualified as title holder, hence the spot is given to the best Asian team from World Team Ranking.

== Qualification process ==
The number of teams participating in the final tournament are 16. Even though the qualification process began in February 2018, the allocation of slots for each confederation was similar to the allocation in 2016 tournament.

=== Summary of qualification ===
Confederation	Teams started	Teams that have qualified	Teams that can still qualify	Teams that have been eliminated	Remaining places in finals	Total places in finals
Badminton Africa	7	1	0	6	0	1
Badminton Asia	11+2	4+2	0	7	0	4+2
Badminton Europe	24	4	0	20	0	4
Badminton Pan Am	6	0	2	4	1	1
Badminton Oceania	4	1	0	3	0	1
Various	—N/a	3	—N/a	—N/a	0	3
Total	52+2	13+2	2	40	1	14+2

Note

- Badminton Asia total includes +1 for Thailand as hosts, and China as trophy holders.
- Various is the top three of the ranking qualification.

== Confederation qualification ==
=== Badminton Confederation of Africa ===
The qualification for the African teams was held from 12 to 15 February 2018, at the Hacène Harcha Arena in Algiers, Algeria. The winners of the African qualification will qualified for the Uber Cup.

==== Teams in contention ====
Teams qualified for the Group stage

- Algeria
- Egypt
- Ghana
- Mauritius
- Nigeria
- Uganda
- Zimbabwe

==== First round (group stage) ====
Advance to Knockout stage

Group A

Pos	Team	Pld	Pts
1	Nigeria	2	2
2	Algeria	2	1
3	Uganda	2	0

Source: TS
Group B

Pos	Team	Pld	Pts
1	Mauritius	3	3
2	Egypt	3	2
3	Ghana	3	1
4	Zimbabwe	3	0

Source: TS

==== Second round (knockout stage) ====
Semi-finals
14 February
Nigeria	3
Egypt	2
14 February
Algeria	2
Mauritius	3

Final
15 February
Nigeria	0
Mauritius	3

=== Badminton Asia ===
The qualification for the Asian teams was held from 6 to 11 February 2018, at the Stadium Sultan Abdul Halim in Alor Setar, Malaysia. The semi-finalist of the Asian qualification will qualified for the Uber Cup. Thailand qualifying automatically as hosts, and China qualifying automatically as trophy holder.

==== Teams in contention ====
Teams qualified for the Group stage

- China (qualified)
- Hong Kong
- Indonesia
- India
- Japan
- Malaysia
- Maldives
- Philippines
- Singapore
- South Korea
- Chinese Taipei
- Thailand (qualified)
- Vietnam

==== First round (group stage) ====
Advance to Knockout stage

Group W
Group X

Pos	Team	Pld	Pts
1	Japan	2	2
2	India	2	1
3	Hong Kong	2	0

Source: TS

Pos	Team	Pld	Pts
1	South Korea	2	2
2	Chinese Taipei	2	1
3	Maldives	2	0

Source: TS
Group Y
Group Z

Pos	Team	Pld	Pts
1	Thailand	3	3
2	Malaysia	3	2
3	Vietnam	3	1
4	Philippines	3	0

Source: TS

Pos	Team	Pld	Pts
1	Indonesia	2	2
2	China	2	1
3	Singapore	2	0

Source: TS

==== Second round (knockout stage) ====
Quarter-finals
9 February 08:30
Japan	3
Chinese Taipei	0
9 February 08:30
Indonesia	3
India	1
9 February 08:30
China	3
Thailand	1
9 February 08:30
Malaysia	0
South Korea	3

Semi-finals
10 February 12:00
Japan	3
Indonesia	0
10 February 12:00
China	3
South Korea	1

Final
11 February 12:00
Japan	3
China	0

=== Badminton Europe ===
The qualification for the European teams was held from 13 to 18 February 2018, at the Kazan Gymnastics Centre in Kazan, Russia. The semi-finalists of the European qualification will qualify for the Uber Cup.

==== Teams in contention ====
Teams qualified for the Group stage

- Belarus
- Bulgaria
- Czech Republic
- Denmark
- England
- Estonia
- France
- Germany
- Greenland
- Hungary
- Iceland
- Ireland
- Israel
- Latvia
- Lithuania
- Norway
- Poland
- Portugal
- Russia
- Slovakia
- Sweden
- Spain
- Turkey
- Ukraine

==== First round (group stage) ====
Advance to Knockout stage

Group 1
Group 2
Group 3

Pos	Team	Pld	Pts
1	Denmark	3	3
2	Sweden	3	2
3	Israel	3	1
4	Iceland	3	0

Source: TS

Pos	Team	Pld	Pts
1	Spain	3	3
2	Hungary	3	2
3	Slovakia	3	1
4	Portugal	3	0

Source: TS

Pos	Team	Pld	Pts
1	Germany	3	3
2	Ukraine	3	2
3	Ireland	3	1
4	Lithuania	3	0

Source: TS
Group 4
Group 5
Group 6

Pos	Team	Pld	Pts
1	Russia	3	3
2	Turkey	3	2
3	Estonia	3	1
4	Latvia	3	0

Source: TS

Pos	Team	Pld	Pts
1	Bulgaria	3	3
2	France	3	2
3	Belarus	3	1
4	Greenland	3	0

Source: TS

Pos	Team	Pld	Pts
1	England	3	3
2	Poland	3	2
3	Czech Republic	3	1
4	Norway	3	0

Source: TS

Ranking of runners-up

Pos	Grp	Team	Pld	W	L	MF	MA	MD	GF	GA	GD	PF	PA	PD	Pts	Qualification
1	5	France	3	2	1	12	3	+9	24	7	+17	602	412	+190	2	Knockout stage
2	4	Turkey	3	2	1	11	4	+7	25	9	+16	667	493	+174	2	Knockout stage
3	2	Hungary	3	2	1	11	4	+7	23	13	+10	689	603	+86	2	
4	3	Ukraine	3	2	1	10	5	+5	24	12	+12	698	561	+137	2	
5	1	Sweden	3	2	1	10	5	+5	21	11	+10	570	451	+119	2	
6	6	Poland	3	2	1	7	8	−1	15	18	−3	598	623	−25	2	

==== Second round (knockout stage) ====
Quarter-finals
16 February 2018
Denmark	3
England	0
16 February 2018
Russia	3
Bulgaria	1
16 February 2018
France	0
Germany	3
16 February 2018
Turkey	2
Spain	3

Semi-finals
17 February 2018
Denmark	3
Russia	1
17 February 2018
Germany	3
Spain	2

Final
18 February 2018
Denmark	3
Germany	1

=== Badminton Pan Am ===
The qualification for the Pan American teams will held from 15 to 18 February 2018, at the National Racket Centre in Tacarigua, Trinidad and Tobago. The winner of the Pan American qualification will qualified for the Uber Cup.

==== Teams in contention ====
Teams qualified for the Group stage

- Barbados
- Canada
- ~~Dominican Republic~~
- Peru
- Trinidad and Tobago
- United States

==== First round (group stage) ====
Advance to Knockout stage

Group A

Pos	Team	Pld	Pts
1	United States	2	2
2	Guatemala	2	1
3	Trinidad and Tobago	2	0

Source: TS
Group B

Pos	Team	Pld	Pts
1	Canada	1	1
2	Peru	1	0
3	Dominican Republic	2	0

Source: TS

==== Second round (knockout stage) ====
Semi-finals
17 February
United States	3
Peru	0
17 February
Guatemala	0
Canada	3

Final
18 February
United States	0
Canada	3

=== Badminton Oceania ===
The qualification for the Oceanian teams was held from 6 to 7 February 2018, at the Eastlink Badminton Stadium in Hamilton, New Zealand. The winner of the Oceania qualification will qualified for the Uber Cup.

==== Teams in contention ====
- Australia
- Fiji
- New Zealand
- Tahiti

==== Round-robin ====
Pos	Team	Pld	W	L	MF	MA	MD	GF	GA	GD	PF	PA	PD	Pts	Qualification
1	Australia	3	3	0	13	2	+11	28	4	+24	662	306	+356	3	Uber Cup
2	New Zealand	3	2	1	12	3	+9	24	8	+16	606	391	+215	2	
3	Fiji	3	1	2	5	10	−5	10	20	−10	388	520	−132	1	
4	Tahiti	3	0	3	0	15	−15	0	30	−30	191	630	−439	0	

Source: TS

== World team rankings ==
Below is the chart of the BWF World Team Ranking calculated by adding World Ranking of top three Women's Singles players and top two Women's Doubles pairs on 22 February 2018.

Rank	Conf.	Nation	Points	Continental results	Qualification status
1	BA	Japan	360,977	Winner	Qualified as BA semifinalists
2	BA	China	308,790	Runner-up	Qualified as trophy holder
3	BA	South Korea	275,957	Semifinals	Qualified as BA semifinalists
4	BA	Thailand	266,524	Quarterfinals	Qualified as host country
5	BA	Chinese Taipei	238,492	Quarterfinals	Qualified by ranking (Asia)
6	BA	India	214,139	Quarterfinals	Qualified by ranking (overall)
7	BE	Denmark	212,284	Winner	Qualified as BE semifinalists
8	BA	Indonesia	205,240	Semifinals	Qualified as BA semifinalists
9	BA	Malaysia	182,004	Quarterfinals	Qualified by ranking (overall)
10	BE	Spain	133,539	Semifinals	Qualified as BE semifinalists
11	BA	Hong Kong	133,018	Group stage	Qualified by ranking (overall)
12	BE	Russia	130,662	Semifinals	Qualified as BE semifinalists
13	BE	Germany	128,462	Runner-up	Qualified as BE semifinalists
14	BPA	Canada	117,395	Winner	Qualified as the winner of BPA
15	BPA	United States	111,359	Runner-up	
16	BE	Bulgaria	110,754	Quarterfinals	
17	BE	England	108,006	Quarterfinals	
18	BE	France	95,214	Quarterfinals	
19	BO	Australia	90,725	Winner	Qualified as the winner of BO
20	BE	Turkey	83,660	Quarterfinals	
21	BPA	Peru	79,736	3rd place	
22	BE	Scotland	72,917		
23	BE	Netherlands	72,460		
24	BE	Ukraine	71,211	Group stage	
25	BA	Vietnam	71,163	Group stage	
26	BA	Singapore	69,328	Group stage	
27	BE	Switzerland	59,920		
28	BE	Czech Republic	57,260	Group stage	
29	BE	Estonia	56,173	Group stage	
30	BE	Belarus	47,900	Group stage	
31	BE	Sweden	47,851	Group stage	
32	BCA	Egypt	45,058	Semifinals	
33	BE	Finland	44,140		
34	BPA	Guatemala	41,593	4th place	
35	BE	Hungary	40,194	Group stage	
36	BCA	Mauritius	39,539	Winner	Qualified as the winner of BCA
37	BCA	Nigeria	38,964	Runner-up	
38	BPA	Dominican Republic	37,200		
39	BCA	Uganda	34,061	Group stage	
40	BCA	Algeria	31,294	Semifinals	
41	BO	New Zealand	31,207	Runner-up	
42	BPA	Mexico	31,200		
43	BE	Italy	29,700		
44	BE	Belgium	29,150		
45	BCA	Zambia	29,009		
46	BE	Ireland	28,443	Group stage	
47	BPA	Brazil	27,560		
48	BE	Lithuania	26,109	Group stage	
49	BE	Israel	25,163	Group stage	
50	BE	Latvia	24,187	Group stage	
50+ participants
52	BE	Slovakia	22,051	Group stage	
54	BE	Norway	21,571	Group stage	
55	BE	Portugal	20,543	Group stage	
57	BE	Poland	19,272	Group stage	
61	BCA	Ghana	14,270	Group stage	
62	BA	Maldives	13,590	Group stage	
65	BE	Iceland	12,960	Group stage	
66	BO	Fiji	10,920	3rd place	
71	BA	Philippines	9,337	Group stage	
76	BO	Tahiti	7,850	4th place	
85	BPA	Trinidad and Tobago	5,590	5th place	
96	BCA	Zimbabwe	2,820	Group stage	
108	BE	Greenland	750	Group stage	
