= Golf at the 2017 Summer Universiade – Women's individual =

Women's Individual at the XXIX Summer Universiade
- Venue: Sunrise Golf & Country Club
- Dates: 24 August 2017 – 26 August 2017
- Competitors: 58 from 24 nations

Medalists
1st place, gold medalist(s)		Mariel Galdiano	United States
2nd place, silver medalist(s)		Chen Hsuan	Chinese Taipei
2nd place, silver medalist(s)		Hou Yu-sang	Chinese Taipei

The women's individual golf event at the 2017 Summer Universiade was held 24–26 August at the Sunrise Golf and Country Club in Taoyuan, Taiwan.

== Final results ==
Rank	Athlete	Round 1		Round 2		Round 3		Total	To Par
Rank	Athlete	Result	To par	Result	To par	Result	To par	Total	To Par
1st place, gold medalist(s)	Mariel Galdiano (USA)	67	−5	72	E	69	−3	208	−8
T (silver)	Chen Hsuan (TPE)	74	+2	71	−1	67	−5	212	−4
T (silver)	Hou Yu-sang (TPE)	72	E	69	−3	71	−1	212	−4
4	Andrea Lee Yu Kyung (USA)	70	−2	72	E	72	E	214	−2
5	Kim Ah-in (KOR)	75	+3	70	−2	70	−2	215	−1
T6	An Su-bin (KOR)	71	−1	72	E	71	−1	216	E
T6	Eri Ashizawa (JPN)	71	−1	74	+2	71	−1	216	E
T8	Maria Jose Fassi Alvarez (MEX)	73	+1	71	−1	74	+2	218	+2
T8	Hikaru Fuchino (JPN)	71	−1	75	+3	72	E	218	+2
T8	Emilee Ann Hoffman (USA)	75	+3	72	E	71	−1	218	+2
T11	Chloe Goadby (GBR)	76	+4	70	−2	73	+1	219	+3
T11	Pimnipa Panthong (THA)	71	−1	72	E	76	+4	219	+3
T13	Pinyada Kuvanun (THA)	75	+3	71	−1	75	+3	221	+5
T13	Pasinee Thongthaengyai (THA)	76	+4	73	+1	72	E	221	+5
15	Maria Balcazar Castillo (MEX)	76	+4	76	+4	70	−2	222	+6
T16	Kristyna Abrahamova (CZE)	74	+2	72	E	77	+5	223	+7
T16	Christina Susan Gloor (SUI)	73	+1	76	+4	74	+2	223	+7
T16	Nicola Katharina Roessler (GER)	75	+3	76	+4	72	E	223	+7
19	Ludovica Farina (ITA)	73	+1	76	+4	75	+3	224	+8
T20	Isabella Leung Hei-nam (HKG)	79	+7	73	+1	73	+1	225	+9
T20	Natsuki Matsuda (JPN)	76	+4	75	+3	74	+2	225	+9
T22	Sofia Anokhina (RUS)	77	+5	76	+4	73	+1	226	+10
T22	Ana Paula Valdes Michel (MEX)	79	+7	73	+1	74	+2	226	+10
T24	Michelle Cheung Wingyee (HKG)	76	+4	77	+5	74	+2	227	+11
T24	Azelia Meichtry (SUI)	74	+2	78	+6	75	+3	227	+11
T24	Carlotta Ricolfi (ITA)	77	+5	77	+5	73	+1	227	+11
T27	Bianca Maria Fabrizio (ITA)	70	−2	82	+10	77	+5	229	+13
T27	Natalia Heckova (SVK)	71	−1	77	+5	81	+9	229	+13
T27	Katerina Vlasinova (CZE)	84	+12	74	+2	71	−1	229	+13
30	Adela Cejnarova (CZE)	80	+8	74	+2	78	+6	232	+16
T31	Mu Li (CAN)	81	+9	74	+2	78	+6	233	+17
T31	Megan Sian Lockett (GBR)	76	+4	79	+7	78	+6	233	+17
T31	Emie Peronnin (FRA)	83	+11	74	+2	76	+4	233	+17
34	Anyssia Herbaut (FRA)	78	+6	79	+7	77	+5	234	+18
T35	Ines Fendt (AUT)	81	+9	77	+5	77	+5	235	+19
T35	Julia Unterweger (AUT)	79	+7	78	+6	78	+6	235	+19
37	Gemma Marie Batty (GBR)	75	+3	80	+8	81	+9	235	+19
T38	Sharon Park Sun In (CAN)	81	+9	81	+9	75	+3	237	+21
T38	Sara Župevec (SLO)	79	+7	75	+3	83	+11	237	+21
T40	Nur Musfirah Ilham Armalis (MAS)	80	+8	77	+5	81	+9	238	+22
T40	Kim Chae-bin (KOR)	81	+9	79	+7	78	+6	238	+22
T40	Tam Yik Ching (HKG)	79	+7	79	+7	80	+8	238	+22
43	Manon Mollé (FRA)	80	+8	81	+9	80	+8	241	+25
44	Laura Upenieks (CAN)	83	+11	78	+6	81	+9	242	+26
T45	Rachel Rebecca Rossel (SUI)	81	+9	82	+10	80	+8	243	+27
T45	Soot Yuet Tham (MAS)	82	+10	84	+12	77	+5	243	+27
47	Ekaterina Karaseva (RUS)	83	+11	82	+10	79	+7	244	+28
48	Nur Afifah Muhammad Razif (MAS)	85	+13	81	+9	79	+7	245	+29
T49	Albina Agayeva (KAZ)	82	+10	82	+10	83	+11	247	+31
T49	Sofya Morozova (RUS)	82	+10	86	+14	79	+7	247	+31
51	Katarzyna Ewa Selwent (POL)	81	+9	87	+15	82	+10	250	+34
52	Amanda Anna Majsterek (POL)	82	+10	84	+12	86	+14	252	+36
T53	Chen Chih-min (TPE)	83	+11	85	+13	88	+16	256	+40
T53	Victoria Leeson (ARG)	84	+12	88	+16	84	+12	256	+40
55	Yasmijn Fleurin van Dijk (NED)	84	+12	89	+17	97	+25	270	+54
56	Enerel Altansukh (MGL)	94	+22	96	+24	101	+29	291	+75
57	Namuunaa Nadmid (MGL)	105	+33	96	+24	99	+27	300	+84
	Iga Joanna Józefiak (POL)	91	+19	WD		—			
