= Billiards at the 2017 Summer Universiade – Men's doubles 9-ball =

Billiards at the XXIX Summer Universiade
- Venue: Expo Dome, Taipei Expo Park
- Dates: August 28, 2017 – August 29, 2017
- Competitors: 16 from 8 nations

Medalists
1st place, gold medalist(s)		Ko Ping-chung; Ko Pin-yi	Chinese Taipei
2nd place, silver medalist(s)		Takayuki Shishido; Kengo Suzuki	Japan
3rd place, bronze medalist(s)		Eirik Riisnaes; Matias Saetre	Norway

The men's 9-ball doubles event at the 2017 Summer Universiade was held on 28 and 29 August at the Expo Dome, Taipei Expo Park.

== Medallist ==
Gold	Silver	Bronze
Chinese Taipei (TPE) Ko Ping-chung; Ko Pin-yi	Japan (JPN) Takayuki Shishido; Kengo Suzuki	Norway (NOR) Eirik Riisnaes; Matias Saetre

== Results ==
Quarterfinals
Ko Ping-chung (TPE); Ko Pin-yi (TPE)	11
Baasandorj Odsuren (MGL); M. Soronzonbold (MGL)	4
Eirik Riisnaes (NOR); Matias Saetre (NOR)	11
Klemen Gradisnik (SLO); Tim Koprivnik (SLO)	5
Rodlin John Bautista (PHI); James Lim (PHI)	8
Takayuki Shishido (JPN); Kengo Suzuki (JPN)	11
Han Song-woo (KOR); Kwon Ho-jun (KOR)	9
Hwang Benjamin Mo Chi (SGP); Leong Junjie, Benedic (SGP)	11

Semifinals
Ko Ping-chung (TPE); Ko Pin-yi (TPE)	11
Eirik Riisnaes (NOR); Matias Saetre (NOR)	5
Takayuki Shishido (JPN); Kengo Suzuki (JPN)	11
Hwang Benjamin Mo Chi (SGP); Leong Junjie, Benedic (SGP)	9

Gold medal
Ko Ping-chung (TPE); Ko Pin-yi (TPE)	11
Takayuki Shishido (JPN); Kengo Suzuki (JPN)	4
Bronze medal
Eirik Riisnaes (NOR); Matias Saetre (NOR)	11
Hwang Benjamin Mo Chi (SGP); Leong Junjie, Benedic (SGP)	4
