= Golf at the 2017 Summer Universiade – Women's team =

Women's team at the XXIX Summer Universiade
- Venue: Sunrise Golf & Country Club
- Dates: 24 August 2017 – 26 August 2017
- Competitors: 54 from 18 nations

Medalists
1st place, gold medalist(s)		Mariel Galdiano; Andrea Lee Yu Kyung; Emilee Ann Hoffman	United States
2nd place, silver medalist(s)		Chen Hsuan; Hou Yu-sang; Chen Chih-min	Chinese Taipei
3rd place, bronze medalist(s)		Kim Ah-in; An Su-bin; Kim Chae-bin	South Korea

The women's team golf event at the 2017 Summer Universiade was held from 24–26 August at the Sunrise Golf & Country Club in Taoyuan, Taiwan.

== Results ==
Team	Rounds			Total	Rank
Team	Round 1	Round 2	Round 3	Total	Rank
United States (USA)	137	144	140	421	1st place, gold medalist(s)
Mariel Galdiano	67	72	69	208	1
Andrea Lee Yu Kyung	70	72	~~72~~	214	4
Emilee Ann Hoffman	~~75~~	~~72~~	71	218	T8
Chinese Taipei (TPE)	146	140	138	424	2nd place, silver medalist(s)
Chen Hsuan	74	71	67	212	T2
Hou Yu-sang	72	69	71	212	T2
Chen Chih-min	~~83~~	~~85~~	~~88~~	256	T53
South Korea (KOR)	146	142	143	431	3rd place, bronze medalist(s)
Kim Ah-in	75	70	70	214	5
An Su-bin	71	72	73	216	T6
Kim Chae-bin	~~81~~	~~79~~	~~78~~	238	T40
Japan (JPN)	142	149	143	434	4
Eri Ashizawa	71	74	71	216	T6
Hikaru Fuchino	71	75	72	218	T8
Natsuki Matsuda	~~76~~	~~75~~	~~74~~	225	T20
Thailand (THA)	146	143	147	436	5
Pimnipa Panthong	71	72	~~76~~	219	T11
Pinyada Kuvanun	75	71	75	221	T13
Pasinee Thongthaengyai	~~76~~	~~73~~	72	221	T13
Mexico (MEX)	149	144	144	437	6
Maria Balcazar Castillo	73	71	74	218	T8
Maria Jose Fassi Alvarez	76	~~76~~	70	222	15
Ana Paula Valdes Michel	~~79~~	73	~~74~~	226	T22
Italy (ITA)	143	153	148	444	7
Ludovica Farina	73	76	75	224	19
Carlotta Ricolfi	~~77~~	77	73	227	T24
Bianca Maria Fabrizio	70	~~82~~	~~77~~	229	T27
Czech Republic (CZE)	154	146	148	448	8
Kristyna Abrahamova	74	72	77	223	T16
Katerina Vlasinova	~~84~~	74	71	229	T27
Adela Cejnarova	80	~~74~~	~~78~~	232	30
Switzerland (SUI)	147	154	149	450	9
Christina Susan Gloor	73	76	74	223	T17
Azelia Meichtry	74	78	75	227	T24
Rachel Rebecca Rossel	~~81~~	~~82~~	~~80~~	243	T45
Great Britain (GBR)	151	149	151	451	10
Chloe Goadby	76	70	73	219	T11
Megan Sian Lockett	~~76~~	79	78	233	T31
Gemma Marie Batty	75	~~80~~	~~81~~	236	37
Hong Kong (HKG)	155	150	147	452	11
Isabella Leung Hei-nam	79	73	73	225	T20
Michelle Cheung Wingyee	76	77	74	227	T24
Tam Yik Ching	~~79~~	~~79~~	~~80~~	238	T40
France (FRA)	158	153	153	464	12
Emie Peronnin	~~83~~	74	76	233	T31
Anyssia Herbaut	78	79	77	234	34
Manon Mollé	80	~~81~~	~~80~~	241	43
Canada (CAN)	162	152	153	467	13
Mu Li	81	74	78	233	T31
Sharon Park Sun In	81	~~81~~	75	237	T38
Laura Upenieks	~~83~~	78	~~81~~	242	44
Russia (RUS)	159	158	152	469	14
Sofia Anokhina	77	76	73	226	T22
Ekaterina Karaseva	~~83~~	82	79	244	47
Sofya Morozova	82	~~86~~	~~79~~	247	T49
Austria (AUT)	160	155	155	470	15
Ines Fendt	81	77	77	235	T35
Julia Unterweger	79	78	78	235	T35
Malaysia (MAS)	162	158	156	476	16
Nur Musfirah Ilham Armalis	80	77	~~81~~	238	T40
Soot Yuet Tham	82	~~84~~	77	243	T45
Nur Afifah Muhammad Razif	~~85~~	81	79	245	48
Poland (POL)	163	171	168	502	17
Katarzyna Ewa Selwent	81	87	82	250	51
Amanda Anna Majsterek	82	84	86	252	52
Iga Joanna Józefiak	~~91~~	WD	—		
Mongolia (MGL)	199	192	200	591	18
Enerel Altansukh	94	96	101	291	56
Namuunaa Nadmid	105	96	99	300	57
