= 2018 Badminton Asia Team Championships – Women's team event =

Women's team at the 2018 Badminton Asia Team Championships
- Venue: Sultan Abdul Halim Stadium
- Location: Alor Setar, Kedah, Malaysia
- Dates: 6–11 February 2018
- Nations: 15

Medalists
gold medal	Indonesia
silver medal	China
bronze medal	Malaysia
bronze medal	South Korea

The women's team event at the 2018 Badminton Asia Team Championships took place from 6 to 11 February at the Sultan Abdul Halim Stadium in Alor Setar, Kedah, Malaysia. Japan were the defending champions.

== Seeds ==
The seeds were announced on 20 January 2018 based on the BWF World Team Rankings.

1. Japan (champions)
2. China (final)
3. South Korea (semi-finals)
4. Thailand (quarter-finals)
5. Chinese Taipei (quarter-finals)
6. India (quarter-finals)
7. Indonesia (semi-finals)
8. Malaysia (quarter-finals)

== Group stage ==
The draw was held on 23 January 2018. The men's team group stages consist of 4 groups: W, X, Y and Z.

Group W	Group X	Group Y	Group Z
Japan (1); India (6); Hong Kong	South Korea (3); Chinese Taipei (5); Maldives	Thailand (4); Malaysia (8, H); Vietnam; Philippines	China (2); Indonesia (7); Singapore

== Group stage ==
All times are Malaysia Standard Time (UTC+08:00).

=== Group W ===
Pos	Team	Pld	W	L	MF	MA	MD	GF	GA	GD	PF	PA	PD	Pts	Qualification
1	Japan	2	2	0	9	1	+8	18	2	+16	412	281	+131	2	Knockout stage
2	India	2	1	1	4	6	−2	10	14	−4	431	456	−25	1	Knockout stage
3	Hong Kong	2	0	2	2	8	−6	6	18	−12	373	479	−106	0	

Source: TS

==== India vs Hong Kong ====
India
3
Stadium Sultan Abdul Halim, Court 2
6 February 2018, 09:00

Hong Kong
2

			1	2	3
1	(India) (Hong Kong)	P. V. Sindhu; Yip Pui Yin	21; 12	21; 18
2	(India) (Hong Kong)	Ashwini Ponnappa / Prajakta Sawant; Ng Wing Yung / Yeung Nga Ting	22; 20	20; 22	10; 21
3	(India) (Hong Kong)	Sri Krishna Priya Kudaravalli; Cheung Ying Mei	19; 21	21; 18	20; 22
4	(India) (Hong Kong)	P. V. Sindhu / N. Sikki Reddy; Ng Tsz Yau / Yuen Sin Ying	21; 15	15; 21	21; 14
5	(India) (Hong Kong)	Gadde Ruthvika Shivani; Yeung Sum Yee	16; 21	21; 16	21; 13

==== Japan vs Hong Kong ====
Japan
5
Stadium Sultan Abdul Halim, Court 2
7 February 2018, 09:00

Hong Kong
0

			1	2	3
1	(Japan) (Hong Kong)	Nozomi Okuhara; Cheung Ngan Yi	21; 14	21; 19
2	(Japan) (Hong Kong)	Misaki Matsutomo / Ayaka Takahashi; Ng Wing Yung / Yeung Nga Ting	21; 8	21; 9
3	(Japan) (Hong Kong)	Sayaka Sato; Cheung Ying Mei	21; 8	21; 11
4	(Japan) (Hong Kong)	Yuki Fukushima / Sayaka Hirota; Ng Tsz Yau / Wu Yi Ting	21; 15	21; 7
5	(Japan) (Hong Kong)	Aya Ohori; Yeung Sum Yee	21; 10	21; 18

==== Japan vs India ====
Japan
4
Stadium Sultan Abdul Halim, Court 2
8 February 2018, 09:00

India
1

			1	2	3
1	(Japan) (India)	Akane Yamaguchi; P. V. Sindhu	19; 21	15; 21
2	(Japan) (India)	Sayaka Sato; Sri Krishna Priya Kudaravalli	21; 12	21; 12
3	(Japan) (India)	Aya Ohori; Ashwini Ponnappa	21; 14	21; 12
4	(Japan) (India)	Shiho Tanaka / Koharu Yonemoto; Sanyogita Ghorpade / Prajakta Sawant	21; 17	21; 17
5	(Japan) (India)	Misaki Matsutomo / Ayaka Takahashi; Ashwini Ponnappa / N. Sikki Reddy	21; 18	21; 18

=== Group X ===
Pos	Team	Pld	W	L	MF	MA	MD	GF	GA	GD	PF	PA	PD	Pts	Qualification
1	South Korea	2	2	0	10	0	+10	20	0	+20	422	180	+242	2	Knockout stage
2	Chinese Taipei	2	1	1	5	5	0	10	10	0	363	272	+91	1	Knockout stage
3	Maldives	2	0	2	0	10	−10	0	20	−20	87	420	−333	0	

Source: TS

==== Chinese Taipei vs Maldives ====
Chinese Taipei
5
Stadium Sultan Abdul Halim, Court 3
6 February 2018, 09:00

Maldives
0

			1	2	3
1	(Chinese Taipei) (Maldives)	Lee Chia-hsin; Fathimath Nabaaha Abdul Razzaq	21; 1	21; 8
2	(Chinese Taipei) (Maldives)	Chiang Mei-hui; Aminath Nabeeha Abdul Razzaq	21; 8	21; 11
3	(Chinese Taipei) (Maldives)	Sung Shuo-yun; Moosa Aminath Shahurunaz	21; 3	21; 6
4	(Chinese Taipei) (Maldives)	Hung Yi-ting / Lin Ying-chun; Fathimath Nabaaha Abdul Razzaq / Aminath Nabeeha Abdul Razzaq	21; 8	21; 6
5	(Chinese Taipei) (Maldives)	Hsu Ya-ching / Wu Ti-jung; Nafha Nasrullah / Moosa Aminath Shahurunaz	21; 4	21; 5

==== South Korea vs Maldives ====
South Korea
5
Stadium Sultan Abdul Halim, Court 3
7 February 2018, 09:00

Maldives
0

			1	2	3
1	(South Korea) (Maldives)	Lee Jang-mi; Fathimath Nabaaha Abdul Razzaq	21; 3	21; 4
2	(South Korea) (Maldives)	Chang Ye-na / Kim Hye-rin; Nafha Nasrullah / Moosa Aminath Shahurunaz	21; 3	21; 4
3	(South Korea) (Maldives)	Jeon Joo-i; Aminath Nabeeha Abdul Razzaq	21; 3	21; 2
4	(South Korea) (Maldives)	Baek Ha-na / Lee Yu-rim; Aminath Nabeeha Abdul Razzaq / Fathimath Nabaaha Abdul Razzaq	21; 1	21; 1
5	(South Korea) (Maldives)	An Se-young; Nafha Nasrullah	21; 2	21; 4

==== South Korea vs Chinese Taipei ====
South Korea
5
Stadium Sultan Abdul Halim, Court 3
8 February 2018, 09:00

Chinese Taipei
0

			1	2	3
1	(South Korea) (Chinese Taipei)	Sung Ji-hyun; Pai Yu-po	21; 12	23; 21
2	(South Korea) (Chinese Taipei)	Lee So-hee / Shin Seung-chan; Hsu Ya-ching / Wu Ti-jung	21; 19	21; 13
3	(South Korea) (Chinese Taipei)	Lee Jang-mi; Lee Chia-hsin	21; 11	21; 10
4	(South Korea) (Chinese Taipei)	Chang Ye-na / Kim Hye-rin; Chiang Kai-hsin / Hung Shih-han	21; 13	21; 17
5	(South Korea) (Chinese Taipei)	Jeon Joo-i; Chiang Mei-hui	21; 19	21; 18

=== Group Y ===
Pos	Team	Pld	W	L	MF	MA	MD	GF	GA	GD	PF	PA	PD	Pts	Qualification
1	Thailand	3	3	0	13	2	+11	27	5	+22	656	452	+204	3	Knockout stage
2	Malaysia	3	2	1	11	4	+7	22	9	+13	594	460	+134	2	Knockout stage
3	Vietnam	3	1	2	6	9	−3	13	19	−6	533	545	−12	1	
4	Philippines	3	0	3	0	15	−15	1	30	−29	321	647	−326	0	

Source: TS

==== Malaysia vs Vietnam ====
Malaysia
4
Stadium Sultan Abdul Halim, Court 1
6 February 2018, 14:00

Vietnam
1

			1	2	3
1	(Malaysia) (Vietnam)	Soniia Cheah; Vũ Thị Trang	21; 15	21; 17
2	(Malaysia) (Vietnam)	Goh Jin Wei; Nguyễn Thùy Linh	21; 11	21; 15
3	(Malaysia) (Vietnam)	Kisona Selvaduray; Đinh Thị Phương Hồng	21; 17	21; 18
4	(Malaysia) (Vietnam)	Vivian Hoo / Woon Khe Wei; Nguyễn Thùy Linh / Vũ Thị Trang	10; 10			retired
5	(Malaysia) (Vietnam)	Chow Mei Kuan / Goh Yea Ching; Đinh Thị Phương Hồng / Đỗ Thị Hoài	21; 7	21; 18

==== Thailand vs Philippines ====
Thailand
5
Stadium Sultan Abdul Halim, Court 4
6 February 2018, 14:00

Philippines
0

			1	2	3
1	(Thailand) (Philippines)	Nitchaon Jindapol; Sarah Barredo	21; 10	21; 11
2	(Thailand) (Philippines)	Pornpawee Chochuwong; Nicole Albo	21; 10	21; 4
3	(Thailand) (Philippines)	Busanan Ongbamrungphan; Thea Pomar	21; 4	21; 7
4	(Thailand) (Philippines)	Chayanit Chaladchalam / Phataimas Muenwong; Nicole Albo / Sarah Barredo	21; 15	21; 15
5	(Thailand) (Philippines)	Puttita Supajirakul / Sapsiree Taerattanachai; Alyssa Leonardo / Thea Pomar	21; 13	21; 11

==== Malaysia vs Philippines ====
Malaysia
5
Stadium Sultan Abdul Halim, Court 1
7 February 2018, 14:00

Philippines
0

			1	2	3
1	(Malaysia) (Philippines)	Soniia Cheah; Sarah Barredo	21; 7	21; 6
2	(Malaysia) (Philippines)	Goh Jin Wei; Nicole Albo	21; 6	21; 7
3	(Malaysia) (Philippines)	Lim Yin Fun; Thea Pomar	21; 5	21; 8
4	(Malaysia) (Philippines)	Vivian Hoo / Tee Jing Yi; Nicole Albo / Alyssa Leonardo	21; 12	21; 8
5	(Malaysia) (Philippines)	Chow Mei Kuan / Goh Yea Ching; Sarah Barredo / Thea Pomar	21; 13	21; 14

==== Thailand vs Vietnam ====
Thailand
5
Stadium Sultan Abdul Halim, Court 3
7 February 2018, 14:00

Vietnam
0

			1	2	3
1	(Thailand) (Vietnam)	Nitchaon Jindapol; Vũ Thị Trang	21; 14	21; 11
2	(Thailand) (Vietnam)	Pornpawee Chochuwong; Nguyễn Thùy Linh	21; 9	23; 21
3	(Thailand) (Vietnam)	Busanan Ongbamrungphan; Đỗ Thị Hoài	21; 12	21; 10
4	(Thailand) (Vietnam)	Chayanit Chaladchalam / Phataimas Muenwong; Nguyễn Thùy Linh / Vũ Thị Trang	21; 8	18; 21	23; 21
5	(Thailand) (Vietnam)	Savitree Amitrapai / Pacharapun Chochuwong; Đinh Thị Phương Hồng / Đỗ Thị Hoài	21; 9	21; 10

==== Thailand vs Malaysia ====
Thailand
3
Stadium Sultan Abdul Halim, Court 1
8 February 2018, 14:00

Malaysia
2

			1	2	3
1	(Thailand) (Malaysia)	Nitchaon Jindapol; Soniia Cheah	21; 14	21; 15
2	(Thailand) (Malaysia)	Chayanit Chaladchalam / Phataimas Muenwong; Vivian Hoo / Tee Jing Yi	19; 21	21; 16	15; 21
3	(Thailand) (Malaysia)	Pornpawee Chochuwong; Goh Jin Wei	21; 19	21; 17
4	(Thailand) (Malaysia)	Puttita Supajirakul / Sapsiree Taerattanachai; Chow Mei Kuan / Goh Yea Ching	15; 21	15; 21
5	(Thailand) (Malaysia)	Busanan Ongbamrungphan; Lim Yin Fun	23; 21	22; 20

==== Vietnam vs Philippines ====
Vietnam
5
Stadium Sultan Abdul Halim, Court 4
8 February 2018, 14:00

Philippines
0

			1	2	3
1	(Vietnam) (Philippines)	Vũ Thị Trang; Sarah Barredo	21; 16	21; 7
2	(Vietnam) (Philippines)	Nguyễn Thùy Linh; Nicole Albo	21; 14	21; 11
3	(Vietnam) (Philippines)	Đinh Thị Phương Hồng; Thea Pomar	21; 9	21; 14
4	(Vietnam) (Philippines)	Đinh Thị Phương Hồng / Đỗ Thị Hoài; Sarah Barredo / Alyssa Leonardo	21; 9	21; 12
5	(Vietnam) (Philippines)	Nguyễn Thùy Linh / Vũ Thị Trang; Nicole Albo / Thea Pomar	17; 21	21; 10	21; 12

=== Group Z ===
Pos	Team	Pld	W	L	MF	MA	MD	GF	GA	GD	PF	PA	PD	Pts	Qualification
1	Indonesia	2	2	0	8	2	+6	16	6	+10	438	346	+92	2	Knockout stage
2	China	2	1	1	7	3	+4	16	6	+10	430	342	+88	1	Knockout stage
3	Singapore	2	0	2	0	10	−10	0	20	−20	240	420	−180	0	

Source: TS

==== Indonesia vs Singapore ====
Indonesia
5
Stadium Sultan Abdul Halim, Court 4
6 February 2018, 09:00

Singapore
0

			1	2	3
1	(Indonesia) (Singapore)	Fitriani; Grace Chua	21; 16	21; 13
2	(Indonesia) (Singapore)	Anggia Shitta Awanda / Ni Ketut Mahadewi Istarani; Insyirah Khan / Bernice Lim	21; 7	21; 17
3	(Indonesia) (Singapore)	Hanna Ramadini; Sito Jia Rong	21; 9	21; 5
4	(Indonesia) (Singapore)	Della Destiara Haris / Rizki Amelia Pradipta; Ren-ne Ong / Crystal Wong	21; 12	21; 19
5	(Indonesia) (Singapore)	Gregoria Mariska Tunjung; Insyirah Khan	21; 12	21; 16

==== China vs Singapore ====
China
5
Stadium Sultan Abdul Halim, Court 4
7 February 2018, 09:00

Singapore
0

			1	2	3
1	(China) (Singapore)	Chen Yufei; Grace Chua	21; 12	21; 8
2	(China) (Singapore)	Du Yue / Li Yinhui; Ren-ne Ong / Crystal Wong	21; 14	21; 18
3	(China) (Singapore)	He Bingjiao; Sito Jia Rong	21; 12	21; 10
4	(China) (Singapore)	Dong Wengjing / Feng Xueying; Ker'sara Koh / Bernice Lim	21; 10	21; 12
5	(China) (Singapore)	Gao Fangjie; Insyirah Khan	21; 6	21; 12

==== China vs Indonesia ====
China
2
Stadium Sultan Abdul Halim, Court 4
8 February 2018, 09:00

Indonesia
3

			1	2	3
1	(China) (Indonesia)	Chen Yufei; Fitriani	21; 16	12; 21	15; 21
2	(China) (Indonesia)	Du Yue / Li Yinhui; Greysia Polii / Apriyani Rahayu	18; 21	12; 21
3	(China) (Indonesia)	He Bingjiao; Gregoria Mariska Tunjung	23; 21	21; 10
4	(China) (Indonesia)	Cao Tongwei / Zheng Yu; Della Destiara Haris / Rizki Amelia Pradipta	14; 21	21; 19	21; 23
5	(China) (Indonesia)	Chen Xiaoxin; Ruselli Hartawan	21; 17	21; 17

== Knockout stage ==
=== Bracket ===
Quarter-finals
9 February 08:30
Japan	3
Chinese Taipei	0
9 February 08:30
Indonesia	3
India	1
9 February 08:30
China	3
Thailand	1
9 February 08:30
Malaysia	0
South Korea	3

Semi-finals
10 February 12:00
Japan	3
Indonesia	0
10 February 12:00
China	3
South Korea	1

Final
11 February 12:00
Japan	3
China	0

=== Quarter-finals ===
==== Japan vs Chinese Taipei ====
Japan
3
Stadium Sultan Abdul Halim, Court 1
9 February 2018, 08:30

Chinese Taipei
0

			1	2	3
1	(Japan) (Chinese Taipei)	Akane Yamaguchi; Pai Yu-po	21; 9	21; 12
2	(Japan) (Chinese Taipei)	Misaki Matsutomo / Ayaka Takahashi; Hsu Ya-ching / Wu Ti-jung	21; 13	21; 14
3	(Japan) (Chinese Taipei)	Nozomi Okuhara; Lee Chia-hsin	21; 17	21; 19
4	(Japan) (Chinese Taipei)	Yuki Fukushima / Sayaka Hirota; Chiang Kai-hsin / Hung Shih-han				not played
5	(Japan) (Chinese Taipei)	Sayaka Sato; Chiang Mei-hui				not played

==== Indonesia vs India ====
Indonesia
3
Stadium Sultan Abdul Halim, Court 4
9 February 2018, 08:30

India
1

			1	2	3
1	(Indonesia) (India)	Fitriani; P. V. Sindhu	13; 21	22; 24
2	(Indonesia) (India)	Greysia Polii / Apriyani Rahayu; Ashwini Ponnappa / N. Sikki Reddy	21; 5	21; 16
3	(Indonesia) (India)	Hanna Ramadini; Sri Krishna Priya Kudaravalli	21; 8	21; 15
4	(Indonesia) (India)	Anggia Shitta Awanda / Ni Ketut Mahadewi Istarani; Sanyogita Ghorpade / P. V. Sindhu	21; 9	21; 18
5	(Indonesia) (India)	Gregoria Mariska Tunjung; Rutaparna Panda				not played

==== China vs Thailand ====
China
3
Stadium Sultan Abdul Halim, Court 3
9 February 2018, 08:30

Thailand
1

			1	2	3
1	(China) (Thailand)	Chen Yufei; Nitchaon Jindapol	19; 21	21; 14	21; 14
2	(China) (Thailand)	Dong Wenjing / Feng Xueying; Chayanit Chaladchalam / Phataimas Muenwong	21; 16	23; 21
3	(China) (Thailand)	He Bingjiao; Pornpawee Chochuwong	13; 21	21; 18	23; 25
4	(China) (Thailand)	Cao Tongwei / Zheng Yu; Savitree Amitrapai / Pacharapun Chochuwong	19; 21	21; 19	21; 14
5	(China) (Thailand)	Gao Fangjie; Busanan Ongbamrungphan				not played

==== Malaysia vs South Korea ====
Malaysia
0
Stadium Sultan Abdul Halim, Court 2
9 February 2018, 08:30

South Korea
3

			1	2	3
1	(Malaysia) (South Korea)	Soniia Cheah; Sung Ji-hyun	13; 21	10; 21
2	(Malaysia) (South Korea)	Vivian Hoo / Tee Jing Yi; Lee So-hee / Shin Seung-chan	10; 21	15; 21
3	(Malaysia) (South Korea)	Goh Jin Wei; Lee Jang-mi	21; 17	11; 21	13; 21
4	(Malaysia) (South Korea)	Chow Mei Kuan / Goh Yea Ching; Chang Ye-na / Kim Hye-rin				not played
5	(Malaysia) (South Korea)	Lim Yin Fun; An Se-young				not played

=== Semi-finals ===
==== Japan vs Indonesia ====
Japan
3
Stadium Sultan Abdul Halim, Court 1
10 February 2018, 12:00

Indonesia
0

			1	2	3
1	(Japan) (Indonesia)	Akane Yamaguchi; Fitriani	17; 21	21; 13	21; 17
2	(Japan) (Indonesia)	Misaki Matsutomo / Ayaka Takahashi; Greysia Polii / Apriyani Rahayu	20; 22	21; 19	21; 18
3	(Japan) (Indonesia)	Nozomi Okuhara; Gregoria Mariska Tunjung	21; 5	19; 21	21; 15
4	(Japan) (Indonesia)	Yuki Fukushima / Sayaka Hirota; Della Destiara Haris / Rizki Amelia Pradipta				not played
5	(Japan) (Indonesia)	Sayaka Sato; Ruselli Hartawan				not played

==== China vs South Korea ====
China
3
Stadium Sultan Abdul Halim, Court 2
10 February 2018, 12:00

South Korea
1

			1	2	3
1	(China) (South Korea)	Chen Yufei; Sung Ji-hyun	21; 14	21; 15
2	(China) (South Korea)	Dong Wenjing / Feng Xueying; Lee So-hee / Shin Seung-chan	13; 21	9; 21
3	(China) (South Korea)	He Bingjiao; Lee Jang-mi	21; 19	21; 19
4	(China) (South Korea)	Cao Tongwei / Zheng Yu; Chang Ye-na / Kim Hye-rin	21; 17	21; 14
5	(China) (South Korea)	Gao Fangjie; An Se-young				not played

=== Final ===
==== Japan vs China ====
Japan
3
Stadium Sultan Abdul Halim, Court 1
11 February 2018, 12:00

China
0

			1	2	3
1	(Japan) (China)	Akane Yamaguchi; Chen Yufei	21; 16	12; 21	21; 14
2	(Japan) (China)	Misaki Matsutomo / Ayaka Takahashi; Du Yue / Li Yinhui	21; 13	21; 16
3	(Japan) (China)	Nozomi Okuhara; He Bingjiao	19; 21	21; 16	21; 10
4	(Japan) (China)	Yuki Fukushima / Sayaka Hirota; Cao Tongwei / Zheng Yu				not played
5	(Japan) (China)	Sayaka Sato; Gao Fangjie				not played

== Final ranking ==
Pos	Team	Pld	W	L	Pts	MD	GD	PD	Final result
1st place, gold medalist(s)	Japan	5	5	0	5	+17	+29	+234	Champions
2nd place, silver medalist(s)	China	5	3	2	3	+5	+13	+85	Runners-up
3rd place, bronze medalist(s)	South Korea	4	3	1	3	+11	+21	+284	Eliminated in semi-finals
3rd place, bronze medalist(s)	Indonesia	4	3	1	3	+5	+11	+106	Eliminated in semi-finals
5	Thailand	4	3	1	3	+9	+19	+185	Eliminated in quarter-finals
6	Malaysia	4	2	2	2	+4	+10	+116	Eliminated in quarter-finals
7	Chinese Taipei	3	1	2	1	−3	−6	+49	Eliminated in quarter-finals
8	India	3	1	2	1	−4	−8	−70	Eliminated in quarter-finals
9	Vietnam	3	1	2	1	−3	−6	−12	Eliminated in group stage
10	Hong Kong	2	0	2	0	−6	−12	−106	Eliminated in group stage
11	Singapore	2	0	2	0	−10	−20	−180	Eliminated in group stage
12	Maldives	2	0	2	0	−10	−20	−333	Eliminated in group stage
13	Philippines	3	0	3	0	−15	−29	−326	Eliminated in group stage
