= Mariel Galdiano =

American professional golfer (born 1998)

Personal information
- Full name: Mariel Lancy Galdiano
- Nationality: United States
- Born: June 25, 1998 (age 28) Honolulu, Hawaii, U.S.

Career
- Sport: Golf
- College: UCLA
- Turned professional: 2020
- Current tour: LPGA Tour
- Former tour: Epson Tour

Best results in LPGA major championships
- Chevron Championship: DNP
- Women's PGA C'ship: CUT: 2025
- U.S. Women's Open: T42: 2015
- Women's British Open: DNP
- Evian Championship: DNP
Medal record
Summer Universiade
Gold medal – first place	2017 Taipei	Individual
Gold medal – first place	2017 Taipei	Women's team

Mariel Lancy Galdiano (born June 25, 1998) is an American professional golfer.

At age 13 she was the youngest golfer at the 2011 U.S. Women's Open.

Galdiano made the cut at the 2015 U.S. Women's Open. She won her sectional qualifier to earn entry into the tournament.

Galdiano is a three-time Hawaii High School Athletic Association champion.

Galdiano won the 2015 Canadian Women's Amateur.

At the 2017 Summer Universiade (World University Games), Galdiano won the gold medal in the individual event and led the United States to the team gold medal.

Galdiano turned professional in 2020.

In December 2024, Galdiano earned her LPGA Tour card for 2025 by finishing T-13 at the LPGA Final Qualifying Tournament.

== Amateur wins ==
- 2013 Callaway Junior World Golf Championships (Girls 15–17)
- 2014 Jennie K Wilson Invitational, Joanne Winter Arizona Silver Belle Championship
- 2015 Canadian Women's Amateur
- 2017 Summer Universiade – individual gold medal
- 2018 Golfweek Conference Challenge, Stanford Intercollegiate

== Team appearances ==
Amateur

- Junior Solheim Cup (representing the United States): 2015 (winners)
- Curtis Cup (representing the United States): 2016, 2018 (winners)
- Espirito Santo Trophy (representing the United States): 2016
- Arnold Palmer Cup (representing the United States): 2018 (winners), 2019
