= Badminton at the 2017 Summer Universiade – Men's singles =

Men's singles at the XXIX Summer Universiade
- Venue: Taipei Gymnasium
- Dates: 27 August 2017 – 29 August 2017
- Competitors: 75 from 24 nations

Medalists
1st place, gold medalist(s)		Wang Tzu-wei	Chinese Taipei
2nd place, silver medalist(s)		Kenta Nishimoto	Japan
3rd place, bronze medalist(s)		Pannawit Thongnuam	Thailand
3rd place, bronze medalist(s)		Yu Igarashi	Japan

The men's singles Badminton event at the 2017 Summer Universiade was held from August 27 to 29 at the Taipei Gymnasium in Taipei, Taiwan.

== Draw ==
=== Finals ===
Quarterfinals
Wang Tzu-wei (TPE)	21	19	21
Lucas Claerbout (FRA)	12	21	12
Jeon Hyeok-jin (KOR)	14	21	13
Yu Igarashi (JPN)	21	12	21
Kenta Nishimoto (JPN)	11
Zulfadli Zulkiffli (MAS)	8^{r}
Pannawit Thongnuam (THA)	13	21	21
Hsu Jen-hao (TPE)	21	14	13

Semifinals
Wang Tzu-wei (TPE)	23	23
Yu Igarashi (JPN)	21	21
Kenta Nishimoto (JPN)	21	21
Pannawit Thongnuam (THA)	19	14

Final
Wang Tzu-wei (TPE)	21	21
Kenta Nishimoto (JPN)	16	15

RET= Retired

=== Top half ===
==== Section 1 ====
Round of 128
D M Sebunnya (UGA)	5	14
U Turk (SLO)	21	21
P A Sudrajat (INA)	21	21
R M Hasnain (PAK)	12	8

Round of 64
Wang T-w (TPE)	21	21
A Souza (BRA)	10	4
P Ambegoda (SRI)	21	15	21
U Turk (SLO)	12	21	17
B Atilano (POR)	21	21
M Laanes (EST)	17	11
D Delmastro (ARG)	8	9
P A Sudrajat (INA)	21	21

Round of 32
Wang T-w (TPE)	21	21
P Ambegoda (SRI)	5	8
B Atilano (POR)	13	10
P A Sudrajat (INA)	21	21

Round of 16
Wang T-w (TPE)	21	21
P A Sudrajat (INA)	10	10

==== Section 2 ====
Round of 128
M Banda (ZAM)	21	10	16
D Darmohoetomo (SUR)	14	21	21

Round of 64
L Claerbout (FRA)	21	21
Mac Marfa (PHI)	7	4
P Kotsarenko (RUS)	21	14	21
A J Bauer (CAN)	17	21	19
D Fan (AUS)	21	21
D Khando (BHU)	2	9
S Dahal (NEP)	15	10
D Darmohoetomo (SUR)	21	21

Round of 32
L Claerbout (FRA)	21	21
P Kotsarenko (RUS)	3	10
D Fan (AUS)	21	21
D Darmohoetomo (SUR)	15	17

Round of 16
L Claerbout (FRA)	21	21
D Fan (AUS)	7	6

==== Section 3 ====
Round of 128
A D Rigonan (PHI)	21	21
T Lusambo (ZAM)	11	13

Round of 64
Jeon H-j (KOR)	21	21
K Singh (IND)	9	9
P Flis (SLO)	21	15	19
D Petrović (SRB)	19	21	21
S Ramachandran (MAS)	21	21
W Cheung (USA)	10	14
Yeung M N (HKG)	21	21
A D Rigonan (PHI)	7	15

Round of 32
Jeon H-j (KOR)	21	21
D Petrović (SRB)	12	8
S Ramachandran (MAS)	21	14	21
Yeung M N (HKG)	10	21	11

Round of 16
Jeon H-j (KOR)	21	21
S Ramachandran (MAS)	11	18

==== Section 4 ====
Round of 128
D Riabov (RUS)	12	16
Poon J-r (SGP)	21	21
H Zoober (EST)	9	10
Pr Thongnuam (THA)	21	21

Round of 64
K Schäfer (GER)	21	21
P Giguère (CAN)	5	12
T Kabomo (BOT)	14	9
Poon J-r (SGP)	21	21
Y Igarashi (JPN)	21	21
B Mateusz (POL)	11	10
MW Chinthaka (SRI)	8	8
Pr Thongnuam (THA)	21	21

Round of 32
K Schäfer (GER)	21	21
Poon J-r (SGP)	13	10
Y Igarashi (JPN)	21	21
Pr Thongnuam (THA)	14	10

Round of 16
K Schäfer (GER)	18	21	14
Y Igarashi (JPN)	21	16	21

=== Bottom half ===
==== Section 5 ====
Round of 128
Ngo Y C (SGP)	21	12	21
M Świerczyński (POL)	14	21	9
M A Masood (PAK)	21	18	21
R Mendes (POR)	18	21	9

Round of 64
Ngo Y C (SGP)	21	21
C Nakaanda (ZAM)	10	4
Tang H K (HKG)	21	21
M Hliničan (SVK)	12	18
M A Masood (PAK)	21	21
A T Fapohunda (NGR)	12	12
JC Clarito (PHI)	6	6
K Nishimoto (JPN)	21	21

Round of 32
Ngo Y C (SGP)	21	19	21
Tang H K (HKG)	12	21	8
M A Masood (PAK)	9	16
K Nishimoto (JPN)	21	21

Round of 16
Ngo Y C (SGP)	2	10
K Nishimoto (JPN)	21	21

==== Section 6 ====
Round of 128
A Kumar (IND)	21	21
F Díaz (ARG)	16	13

Round of 64
A Kumar (IND)	21	21
J Pitman (USA)	15	15
D Bohara (NEP)	5	8
J Ho-shue (CAN)	21	21
Woo S-h (KOR)	21	21
N Rai (BHU)	1	4
Y Musisi (UGA)	8	8
Z Zulkiffli (MAS)	21	21

Round of 32
A Kumar (IND)	11	8
J Ho-shue (CAN)	21	21
Woo S-h (KOR)	21	22	17
Z Zulkiffli (MAS)	10	24	21

Round of 16
J Ho-shue (CAN)	16	14
Z Zulkiffli (MAS)	21	21

==== Section 7 ====
Round of 128
K Jindal (IND)	21	21
M Järveoja (EST)	12	14

Round of 64
K Jindal (IND)	21	21
M Bajuk (SLO)	8	17
S Galbada Liyanage (SRI)	4	7
T J Popov (FRA)	21	21
S Ozeki (JPN)	21	21
M U Khan (PAK)	12	4
V Chiu (USA)	12	8
Pa Thongnuam (THA)	21	21

Round of 32
K Jindal (IND)	13	21	16
T J Popov (FRA)	21	18	21
S Ozeki (JPN)	21	6	18
Pa Thongnuam (THA)	16	21	21

Round of 16
T J Popov (FRA)	21	12	19
Pa Thongnuam (THA)	14	21	21

==== Section 8 ====
Round of 128
H Ebayo (UGA)	23	17
A Parakhodin (RUS)	25	21

Round of 64
A Parakhodin (RUS)	21	22	21
T Olekantse (BOT)	15	24	18
V Phuah C W (MAS)	21	21
B von Bodenstein (RSA)	8	18
A Selladurai (AUS)	21	13	15
I Pavlović (SRB)	18	21	21
K Jakowczuk (POL)	12	13
Hsu J-h (TPE)	21	21

Round of 32
A Parakhodin (RUS)	17	4
V Phuah C W (MAS)	21	21
I Pavlović (SRB)	10	10
Hsu J-h (TPE)	21	21

Round of 16
V Phuah C W (MAS)	12	17
Hsu J-h (TPE)	21	21
