= Golf at the 2017 Summer Universiade =

Golf at the XXIX Summer Universiade
- Venues: Sunrise Golf & Country Club
- Dates: 24–26 August 2017
- Competitors: 127 from 33 nations

Golf was contested at the 2017 Summer Universiade from 24 to 26 August at the Sunrise Golf and Country Club in Taoyuan, Taiwan. The final round on 27 August was cancelled due to a thunderstorm, and all the results are calculated to round 3 only.

== Participating nations ==
- Argentina (4)
- Austria (3)
- Canada (6)
- Chinese Taipei (6)
- Colombia (1)
- Czech Republic (4)
- France (6)
- Germany (1)
- Great Britain (3)
- Hong Kong (6)
- Hungary (2)
- Israel (1)
- Italy (6)
- Japan (6)
- Kazakhstan (4)
- Liechtenstein (3)
- Malaysia (6)
- Mexico (6)
- Mongolia (2)
- Netherlands (2)
- Philippines (3)
- Poland (6)
- Portugal (1)
- Russia (6)
- Serbia (3)
- Slovakia (2)
- Slovenia (1)
- South Africa (3)
- South Korea (6)
- Switzerland (6)
- Thailand (6)
- United States (5)
- Zimbabwe (1)

== Medal summary ==
Event	Gold	Silver	Bronze
Men's individual	Raul Pereda de la Huerta; Mexico	Kazuki Higa; Japan	Liu Yung-hua; Chinese Taipei Kevin Yu; Chinese Taipei
Men's team	Japan (JPN); Kazuki Higa; Daiki Imano; Takumi Kanaya	Mexico (MEX); Luis Gerardo Garza Morfin; Álvaro Ortiz; Raul Pereda de la Huerta	Chinese Taipei (TPE); Liu Yung-hua; Lai Chia-i; Kevin Yu
Women's individual	Mariel Galdiano; United States	Chen Hsuan; Chinese Taipei Hou Yu-sang; Chinese Taipei	not awarded
Women's team	United States (USA); Mariel Galdiano; Emilee Hoffman; Andrea Lee	Chinese Taipei (TPE); Chen Chih-min; Chen Hsuan; Hou Yu-sang	South Korea (KOR); An Su-bin; Kim Ah-in; Kim Chae-bin

=== Medal table ===
Rank	Nation	Gold	Silver	Bronze	Total
1	United States (USA)	2	0	0	2
2	Japan (JPN)	1	1	0	2
2	Mexico (MEX)	1	1	0	2
4	Chinese Taipei (TPE)*	0	3	3	6
5	South Korea (KOR)	0	0	1	1
Totals (5 entries)		4	5	4	13
