= Fatma Demir =

Turkish long-distance runner

Personal information
- Born: 5 May 1996 (age 30)

Sport
- Country: Turkey
- Sport: Long-distance running
Medal record
Women's athletics
Representing Turkey
Balkan Athletics Championships
Silver medal – second place	2017 Novi Pazar	3000 m s'chase

Fatma Demir (born 5 May 1996) is a Turkish long-distance runner. In 2020, she competed in the women's half marathon at the 2020 World Athletics Half Marathon Championships held in Gdynia, Poland. A few months earlier, she won the Istanbul Half Marathon held in Istanbul, Turkey.

In 2017, she competed in the women's half marathon at the 2017 Summer Universiade held in Taipei, Taiwan. Two years later, in 2019, she competed in the women's half marathon at the 2019 Summer Universiade held in Naples, Italy. She finished in 10th place.
