= Baseball at the 2017 Summer Universiade =

Baseball at the XXIX Summer Universiade
- Venues: Tianmu Baseball Stadium, Taipei City Xinzhuang Baseball Stadium, New Taipei City
- Dates: August 20, 2017 – August 29, 2017
- Teams: 8 (men)

Medalists
1st place, gold medalist(s)		Japan
2nd place, silver medalist(s)		United States
3rd place, bronze medalist(s)		South Korea

Men's baseball was contested at the 2017 Summer Universiade from August 20 to 29 in Taipei City and New Taipei City, Taiwan.

== Medals ==
Rank	Nation	Gold	Silver	Bronze	Total
1	Japan (JPN)	1	0	0	1
2	United States (USA)	0	1	0	1
3	South Korea (KOR)	0	0	1	1
Totals (3 entries)		1	1	1	3

== Teams ==
Eight teams participated in the men's tournament.

Group A

- Chinese Taipei
- South Korea
- Czech Republic
- France

Group B

- Japan
- United States
- Mexico
- Russia

== Tournament ==
=== Group stage, group A ===
Team	Pld	W	L	RF	RA	Pct
Czech Republic	3	2	1	16	21	0.67
South Korea	3	2	1	21	7	0.67
Chinese Taipei	3	1	2	17	10	0.33
France	3	1	2	11	27	0.33

August 20, 2017; 11:00 (UTC+8)	France	4–3	Chinese Taipei	Tianmu Baseball Stadium, Taipei City; Attendance: 8,500
August 20, 2017; 11:00 (UTC+8)		Boxscore		Tianmu Baseball Stadium, Taipei City; Attendance: 8,500

August 20, 2017; 18:30 (UTC+8)	Czech Republic	4–3	South Korea	Xinzhuang Baseball Stadium, New Taipei City; Attendance: 800
August 20, 2017; 18:30 (UTC+8)		Boxscore		Xinzhuang Baseball Stadium, New Taipei City; Attendance: 800

August 22, 2017; 11:00 (UTC+8)	France	0–12	South Korea	Tianmu Baseball Stadium, Taipei City; Attendance: 782
August 22, 2017; 11:00 (UTC+8)		Boxscore		Tianmu Baseball Stadium, Taipei City; Attendance: 782

August 22, 2017; 18:30 (UTC+8)	Chinese Taipei	11–0	Czech Republic	Tianmu Baseball Stadium, Taipei City; Attendance: 7,794
August 22, 2017; 18:30 (UTC+8)		Boxscore		Tianmu Baseball Stadium, Taipei City; Attendance: 7,794

August 23, 2017; 18:30 (UTC+8)	Chinese Taipei	3–6	South Korea	Tianmu Baseball Stadium, Taipei City; Attendance: 8,491
August 23, 2017; 18:30 (UTC+8)		Boxscore		Tianmu Baseball Stadium, Taipei City; Attendance: 8,491

August 23, 2017; 11:00 (UTC+8)	Czech Republic	12–7	France	Xinzhuang Baseball Stadium, New Taipei City; Attendance: 347
August 23, 2017; 11:00 (UTC+8)		Boxscore		Xinzhuang Baseball Stadium, New Taipei City; Attendance: 347

=== Group stage, group B ===
Team	Pld	W	L	RF	RA	Pct
Japan	3	3	0	37	7	1.00
United States	3	2	1	21	16	0.67
Mexico	3	1	2	19	10	0.33
Russia	3	0	3	3	47	0.00

August 20, 2017; 11:00 (UTC+8)	Japan	19–0	Russia	Xinzhuang Baseball Stadium, New Taipei City; Attendance: 300
August 20, 2017; 11:00 (UTC+8)		Boxscore		Xinzhuang Baseball Stadium, New Taipei City; Attendance: 300

August 20, 2017; 18:30 (UTC+8)	Mexico	2–3	United States	Tianmu Baseball Stadium, Taipei City; Attendance: 800
August 20, 2017; 18:30 (UTC+8)		Boxscore		Tianmu Baseball Stadium, Taipei City; Attendance: 800

August 22, 2017; 11:00 (UTC+8)	Japan	7–2	Mexico	Xinzhuang Baseball Stadium, New Taipei City; Attendance: 1,002
August 22, 2017; 11:00 (UTC+8)		Boxscore		Xinzhuang Baseball Stadium, New Taipei City; Attendance: 1,002

August 22, 2017; 18:30 (UTC+8)	Russia	3–13	United States	Xinzhuang Baseball Stadium, New Taipei City; Attendance: 600
August 22, 2017; 18:30 (UTC+8)		Boxscore		Xinzhuang Baseball Stadium, New Taipei City; Attendance: 600

August 23, 2017; 11:00 (UTC+8)	Japan	11–5	United States	Tianmu Baseball Stadium, Taipei City; Attendance: 966
August 23, 2017; 11:00 (UTC+8)		Boxscore		Tianmu Baseball Stadium, Taipei City; Attendance: 966

August 23, 2017; 18:30 (UTC+8)	Mexico	15–0	Russia	Xinzhuang Baseball Stadium, New Taipei City; Attendance: 352
August 23, 2017; 18:30 (UTC+8)		Boxscore		Xinzhuang Baseball Stadium, New Taipei City; Attendance: 352

=== Final stage ===
==== Consolation round ====
Team	Pld	W	L	RF	RA	Pct
France	3	2	1	20	18	0.67
Chinese Taipei	3	2	1	29	5	0.67
Mexico	3	2	1	24	16	0.67
Russia	3	0	3	7	41	0.00

August 25, 2017; 11:00 (UTC+8)	Mexico	1–11	Chinese Taipei	Xinzhuang Baseball Stadium, New Taipei City; Attendance: 1,353
August 25, 2017; 11:00 (UTC+8)		Boxscore		Xinzhuang Baseball Stadium, New Taipei City; Attendance: 1,353

August 25, 2017; 18:30 (UTC+8)	France	11–7	Russia	Xinzhuang Baseball Stadium, New Taipei City; Attendance: 563
August 25, 2017; 18:30 (UTC+8)		Boxscore		Xinzhuang Baseball Stadium, New Taipei City; Attendance: 563

August 26, 2017; 11:00 (UTC+8)	Chinese Taipei	15–0	Russia	Xinzhuang Baseball Stadium, New Taipei City; Attendance: 5,265
August 26, 2017; 11:00 (UTC+8)		Boxscore		Xinzhuang Baseball Stadium, New Taipei City; Attendance: 5,265

August 26, 2017; 18:30 (UTC+8)	France	5–8	Mexico	Xinzhuang Baseball Stadium, New Taipei City; Attendance: 1,560
August 26, 2017; 18:30 (UTC+8)		Boxscore		Xinzhuang Baseball Stadium, New Taipei City; Attendance: 1,560

5th-8th place
France	1
Russia	8
Chinese Taipei	11
Mexico	0

5th place match
Russia	1
Chinese Taipei	7
7th place match
France	11
Mexico	5

August 27, 2017; 11:00 (UTC+8)	Chinese Taipei	10–0	Mexico	Xinzhuang Baseball Stadium, New Taipei City; Attendance: 5,458
August 27, 2017; 11:00 (UTC+8)		Boxscore		Xinzhuang Baseball Stadium, New Taipei City; Attendance: 5,458

August 27, 2017; 18:30 (UTC+8)	France	1–8	Russia	Xinzhuang Baseball Stadium, New Taipei City; Attendance: 954
August 27, 2017; 18:30 (UTC+8)		Boxscore		Xinzhuang Baseball Stadium, New Taipei City; Attendance: 954

7th place

August 27, 2017; 11:00 (UTC+8)	Mexico	5–11	France	Xinzhuang Baseball Stadium, New Taipei City; Attendance: 805
August 27, 2017; 11:00 (UTC+8)		Boxscore		Xinzhuang Baseball Stadium, New Taipei City; Attendance: 805

5th place

August 27, 2017; 18:30 (UTC+8)	Chinese Taipei	7–1	Russia	Xinzhuang Baseball Stadium, New Taipei City; Attendance: 3,075
August 27, 2017; 18:30 (UTC+8)		Boxscore		Xinzhuang Baseball Stadium, New Taipei City; Attendance: 3,075

==== Super round ====
Team	Pld	W	L	RF	RA	Pct
Japan	3	3	0	21	7	1.00
United States	3	2	1	19	15	0.67
Czech Republic	3	1	2	5	19	0.33
South Korea	3	0	3	8	12	0.00

August 25, 2017; 11:00 (UTC+8)	Japan	2–1	South Korea	Tianmu Baseball Stadium, Taipei City; Attendance: 1
August 25, 2017; 11:00 (UTC+8)		Boxscore		Tianmu Baseball Stadium, Taipei City; Attendance: 1

August 25, 2017; 18:30 (UTC+8)	Czech Republic	0–8	United States	Tianmu Baseball Stadium, Taipei City; Attendance: 2,364
August 25, 2017; 18:30 (UTC+8)		Boxscore		Tianmu Baseball Stadium, Taipei City; Attendance: 2,364

August 26, 2017; 11:00 (UTC+8)	South Korea	4–6	United States	Tianmu Baseball Stadium, Taipei City; Attendance: 2,422
August 26, 2017; 11:00 (UTC+8)		Boxscore		Tianmu Baseball Stadium, Taipei City; Attendance: 2,422

August 26, 2017; 18:30 (UTC+8)	Czech Republic	1–8	Japan	Tianmu Baseball Stadium, Taipei City; Attendance: 0
August 26, 2017; 18:30 (UTC+8)		Boxscore		Tianmu Baseball Stadium, Taipei City; Attendance: 0

Medal Round
Japan	4
South Korea	0
Czech Republic	4
United States	8

Gold Medal Match
Japan	10
United States	0
Bronze Medal Match
South Korea	6
Czech Republic	2

August 28, 2017; 11:00 (UTC+8)	United States	8–4	Czech Republic	Tianmu Baseball Stadium, Taipei City; Attendance: 1,078
August 28, 2017; 11:00 (UTC+8)		Boxscore		Tianmu Baseball Stadium, Taipei City; Attendance: 1,078

August 28, 2017; 18:30 (UTC+8)	Japan	4–0	South Korea	Tianmu Baseball Stadium, Taipei City; Attendance: 4,148
August 28, 2017; 18:30 (UTC+8)		Boxscore		Tianmu Baseball Stadium, Taipei City; Attendance: 4,148

Bronze medal game

August 29, 2017; 12:00 (UTC+8)	South Korea	6–2	Czech Republic	Tianmu Baseball Stadium, Taipei City; Attendance: 1,020
August 29, 2017; 12:00 (UTC+8)		Boxscore		Tianmu Baseball Stadium, Taipei City; Attendance: 1,020

Gold medal game

August 29, 2017; 18:30 (UTC+8)	Japan	10–0	United States	Tianmu Baseball Stadium, Taipei City; Attendance: 5,627
August 29, 2017; 18:30 (UTC+8)		Boxscore		Tianmu Baseball Stadium, Taipei City; Attendance: 5,627

=== Final standing ===
Rank	Team
1st place, gold medalist(s)	Japan
2nd place, silver medalist(s)	United States
3rd place, bronze medalist(s)	South Korea
4	Czech Republic
5	Chinese Taipei
6	Russia
7	France
8	Mexico
