= Nur Mohd Azriyn Ayub =

Malaysian badminton player (born 1993)

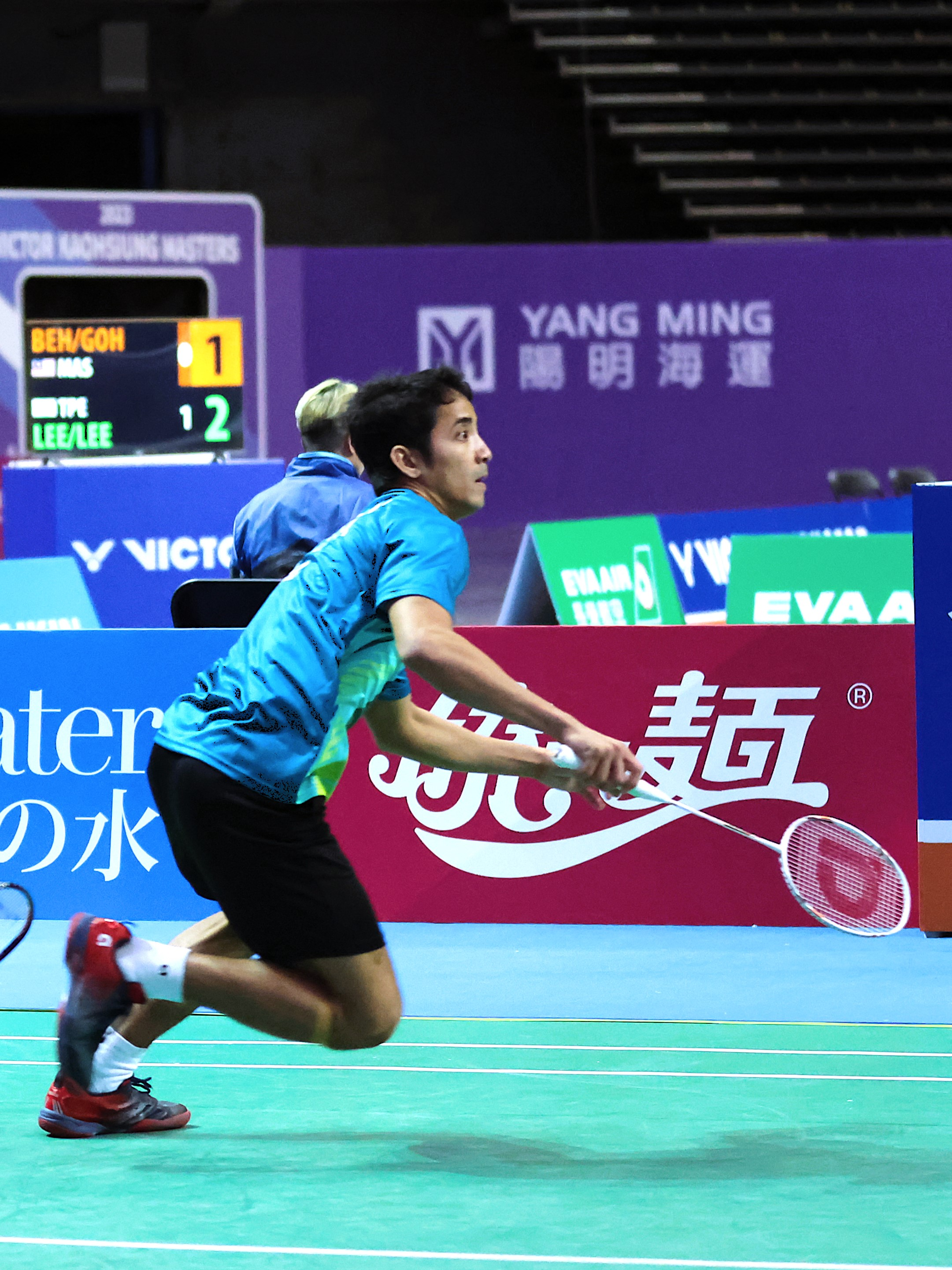
- Azriyn at the 2023 Kaohsiung Masters

Personal information
- Born: 19 July 1993 (age 33)
- Height: 1.68 m (5 ft 6 in)

Sport
- Country: Malaysia
- Sport: Badminton
- Handedness: Right

Men's doubles
- Highest ranking: 23 (with Tan Wee Kiong, 11 March 2025); 29 (with Mohamad Arif Abdul Latif, 30 April 2019)
- Current ranking: 29 (with Tan Wee Kiong, 10 November 2026)
- BWF profile
Medal record
Men's badminton
Representing Malaysia
Summer Universiade
Silver medal – second place	2017 Taipei	Mixed doubles
Bronze medal – third place	2017 Taipei	Mixed team
World Junior Championships
Gold medal – first place	2011 Taipei	Mixed team
Bronze medal – third place	2010 Guadalajara	Mixed team
Asian Junior Championships
Silver medal – second place	2011 Lucknow	Mixed team

Nur Mohd Azriyn Ayub (born 19 July 1993) is a Malaysian badminton player. A world junior team champion, world university champion, Universiade silver medalist and two-time Islamic Solidarity Games gold medalist, he was part of the Malaysian mixed team that won gold at the 2011 BWF World Junior Championships. He also won gold medals in men's singles and the men's team event at the 2013 Islamic Solidarity Games, and the men's doubles title at the 2018 World University Badminton Championships with Low Juan Shen.

At the 2017 Summer Universiade, Azriyn won a silver medal in mixed doubles alongside Goh Yea Ching and a bronze medal in the mixed team event. He also secured a bronze medal in mixed doubles at the 2016 World University Badminton Championships with Chow Mei Kuan. At senior level, he won two BWF World Tour Super 100 men's doubles titles, capturing the 2018 Russian Open with Mohamad Arif Abdul Latif and the 2022 Odisha Open with Lim Khim Wah. He also won the Malaysian national men's doubles championship in 2015 alongside Mohamad Arif Abdul Latif.

Azriyn subsequently formed a partnership with Tan Wee Kiong, a silver medalist at the 2016 Summer Olympics. Together, they achieved a career-high men's doubles world ranking of number 23 on 11 March 2025 and competed in several major BWF World Tour tournaments, including the Malaysia Open, Indonesia Open and Denmark Open. During his junior career, he also contributed to Malaysia's mixed team bronze medal at the 2010 BWF World Junior Championships and silver medal at the 2011 Asian Junior Championships.

== Career ==
In 2013, he won the gold medals in the men's singles and men's team event at the Islamic Solidarity Games in Palembang, Indonesia. In 2015, he became the champion of the Malaysia Badminton Championships in men's doubles event partnered with Mohamad Arif Abdul Latif. In 2016, he became the runner-up at the Smiling Fish International tournament in men's doubles event. Together with Low Juan Shen, he won the men's doubles title at the 2018 World University Championships.

== Achievements ==
=== Summer Universiade ===
Mixed doubles
Year	Venue	Partner	Opponent	Score	Result
2017	Taipei Gymnasium; Taipei, Taiwan	(Malaysia) Goh Yea Ching	(Chinese Taipei) Wang Chi-lin (Chinese Taipei) Lee Chia-hsin	21–12, 16–21, 14–21	Silver

=== World University Championships ===
Men's doubles
Year	Venue	Partner	Opponent	Score	Result
2018	Stadium Juara; Kuala Lumpur, Malaysia	(Malaysia) Low Juan Shen	(South Korea) Kim Hwi-tae (South Korea) Kim Jae-hwan	21–7, 21–18	Gold

Mixed doubles
Year	Venue	Partner	Opponent	Score	Result
2016	Sports Palace "Borisoglebskiy"; Ramenskoe, Russia	(Malaysia) Chow Mei Kuan	(Chinese Taipei) Lee Yang (Chinese Taipei) Hsu Ya-ching	14–21, 17–21	Bronze

=== BWF World Tour (2 titles) ===
The BWF World Tour, which was announced on 19 March 2017 and implemented in 2018, is a series of elite badminton tournaments sanctioned by the Badminton World Federation (BWF). The BWF World Tours are divided into levels of World Tour Finals, Super 1000, Super 750, Super 500, Super 300 (part of the HSBC World Tour), and the BWF Tour Super 100.

Men's doubles
Year	Tournament	Level	Partner	Opponent	Score	Result
2018	Russian Open	Super 100	(Malaysia) Mohamad Arif Abdul Latif	(Russia) Konstantin Abramov (Russia) Alexandr Zinchenko	Walkover	(gold) Winner
2022	Odisha Open	Super 100	(Malaysia) Lim Khim Wah	(India) P. S. Ravikrishna (India) Sankar Prasad Udayakumar	18–21, 21–14, 21–16	(gold) Winner

=== BWF International Challenge/Series (3 runners-up) ===
Men's doubles
Year	Tournament	Partner	Opponent	Score	Result
2016	Smiling Fish International	(Malaysia) Jagdish Singh	(Singapore) Danny Bawa Chrisnanta (Singapore) Hendra Wijaya	21–14, 14–21, 14–21	(silver) Runner-up
2017	Smiling Fish International	(Malaysia) Jagdish Singh	(China) Kang Jun (China) Zhang Sijie	15–21, 15–21	(silver) Runner-up
2018	Osaka International	(Malaysia) Mohamad Arif Abdul Latif	(Japan) Hirokatsu Hashimoto (Japan) Hiroyuki Saeki	19–21, 21–15, 15–21	(silver) Runner-up

BWF International Challenge tournament
BWF International Series tournament
