= Chinese Taipei at the 2017 Summer Universiade =

- IOC code: TPE
- NOC: Chinese Taipei University Sports Federation (中華民國大專院校體育總會)
- Website: web2.ctusf.org.tw/index.php

in Taipei, Taiwan 19 - 30 August 2017
- Competitors: 371 in 22 sports
- Flag bearer: Yang Chun-han (Athletics)
- Medals Ranked 3rd: Gold 30 Silver 35 Bronze 31 Total 96

Summer Universiade appearances (overview)
- 1989; 1991; 1993; 1995; 1997; 1999; 2001; 2003; 2005; 2007; 2009; 2011; 2013; 2015; 2017; 2019; 2021; 2025; 2027

Chinese Taipei participated at the 2017 Summer Universiade in Taipei, Taiwan as the host nation.

== Medals by sport ==
Sport	Grand Total				Rank
Sport	1st place, gold medalist(s)	2nd place, silver medalist(s)	3rd place, bronze medalist(s)	Total	Rank
Archery	0	4	1	5	3
Athletics	2	2	4	8	6
Badminton	5	0	3	8	1
Basketball	0	0	1	1	5
Golf	0	3	3	6	4
Gymnastics	1	2	0	3	6
Table Tennis	0	2	5	7	4
Taekwondo	1	5	3	9	6
Tennis	4	1	2	7	1
Roller Sports	10	11	2	23	1
Weightlifting	2	1	4	7	3
Wushu	1	3	2	6	4
Total	26	34	30	90	

Demonstration Sport	Grand Total				Rank
Demonstration Sport	1st place, gold medalist(s)	2nd place, silver medalist(s)	3rd place, bronze medalist(s)	Total	Rank
Billiards	4	1	1	6	1
Total	4	1	1	6	

Medal	Name	Sport	Event	Date
Gold	Yang Chun-han	Athletics	Men's 100 metres	23 August
Gold	Lee Chih-kai	Gymnastics	Men's pommel horse	23 August
Gold	Cheng Chao-tsun	Athletics	Men's javelin throw	26 August
Gold	Wang Tzu-wei	Badminton	Men's singles	29 August
Gold	Tai Tzu-ying	Badminton	Women's singles	29 August
Gold	Hsu Ya-ching; Wu Ti-jung	Badminton	Women's doubles	29 August
Gold	Wang Chi-lin; Lee Chia-hsin	Badminton	Mixed doubles	29 August
Silver	Chen Yi-hsuan	Archery	Women's individual compound	23 August
Silver	Deng Yu-cheng; Peng Shih-cheng; Wei Chun-heng	Archery	Men's team recurve	24 August
Silver	Tan Ya-ting	Archery	Women's individual recurve	24 August
Silver	Le Chien-ying; Peng Chia-mao; Tan Ya-ting	Archery	Women's team recurve	24 August
Silver	Chen Hsuan	Golf	Women's individual	26 August
Silver	Hou Yu-sang	Golf	Women's individual	26 August
Silver	Chen Hsuan; Hou Yu-sang; Chen Chih-min	Golf	Women's team	26 August
Silver	Chen Chieh	Athletics	Men's 400 metres hurdles	27 August
Silver	Chen Kuei-ru	Athletics	Men's 110 metres hurdles	27 August
Silver	Chen Pei-an; Hsu Tzu-chi; Ku Ni-chen; Kung Yun; Wang Hsin-lin; Yang Chian-mei	Gymnastics	Women's rhythmic group all-around	28 August
Silver	Hsu Tzu-chi; Ku Ni-chen; Kung Yun; Wang Hsin-lin; Yang Chian-mei	Gymnastics	Women's rhythmic group 3 balls + 2 ropes	29 August
Bronze	LChen Hsiang-hsuan; Chen Yi-hsuan	Archery	Mixed team compound	23 August
Bronze	Hsiang Chun-hsien	Athletics	Men's high jump	25 August
Bronze	Huang Shih-feng	Athletics	Men's javelin throw	26 August
Bronze	Liu Yung-hua	Golf	Men's individual	26 August
Bronze	Kevin Yu	Golf	Men's individual	26 August
Bronze	Liu Yung-hua; Kevin Yu; Lai Chia-i	Golf	Men's team	26 August
Bronze	Tsao Chun-yu; You Ya-jyun; Chen Yu-hsuan; Chang Chih-hsuan	Athletics	Women's half marathon team	27 August
Bronze	Wei Yi-ching; Yang Chun-han; Cheng Po-yu; Chen Chia-hsun	Athletics	Men's 4 × 100 metres relay	28 August
Bronze	Chiang Mei-hui	Badminton	Women's singles	29 August
Bronze	Lee Jhe-huei; Lee Yang	Badminton	Men's doubles	29 August
Bronze	Lee Yang; Hsu Ya-ching	Badminton	Mixed doubles	29 August

== Medalists ==
=== Official Sports ===
Medal	Athlete(s)	Sport	Event	Date
Gold	Chen Yan-cheng	Roller Sports	Men's 10,000m elimination races	21 Aug
Gold	Yang Ho-chen	Roller Sports	Women's 10,000m elimination races	21 Aug
Gold	Li Cheng-gang; Su Chia-en	Taekwondo	Mixed Pair Poomsae	21 Aug
Gold	Kuo Hsing-chun	Weightlifting	Women's 58kg	21 Aug
Gold	Yang Ho-chen	Roller Sports	Women's 15,000m elimination races	22 Aug
Gold	Huang Yu-lin	Roller Sports	Men's 1000m sprint	22 Aug
Gold	Yang Ho-chen	Roller Sports	Women's 1000m sprint	22 Aug
Gold	Lee Chih-kai	Gymnastics	Men's Pommel horse	23 Aug
Gold	Hung Wan-ting	Weightlifting	Women's 69kg	23 Aug
Gold	Chen Ying-chu	Roller Sports	Women's 500 metres sprint	23 Aug
Gold	Sung Ching-yang; Kao Mao-chieh; Chen Yan-cheng; Huang Yu-lin	Roller Sports	Men's 3000m relay	23 Aug
Gold	Chen Ying-chu; Li Meng-chu; Yang Ho-chen; Tsai Pin-hsuan	Roller Sports	Women's 3000m relay	23 Aug
Gold	Yang Chun-han	Athletics	Men's 100m	24 Aug
Gold	Liang Hsuan-min	Roller Sports	Women's Speed slalom	25 Aug
Gold	Chiang Mei-hui; Hsu Jen-hao; Hsu Ya-ching; Lee Chia-hsin; Lee Jhe-huei; Lee Yang; Tai Tzu-ying; Wang Chi-lin; Wang Tzu-wei; Wen Hao-yun; Wu Ti-jung; Yang Po-hsuan	Badminton	Mixed Team	25 Aug
Gold	Yang Ho-chen	Roller Sports	Women's Marathon	26 Aug
Gold	Cheng Chao-Tsun	Athletics	Men's Javelin	26 Aug
Gold	Chan Hao-ching; Chan Yung-jan	Tennis	Women's Doubles	28 Aug
Gold	Hsu Kai-kuei	Wushu	Men's Taolu - Nanquan & Nangun	29 Aug
Gold	Jason Jung	Tennis	Men's Singles	29 Aug
Gold	Hsieh Cheng-peng; Jason Jung; Peng Hsien-yin; Lee Kwan-yi	Tennis	Men's Team - Classification	29 Aug
Gold	Chan Hao-ching; Chan Yung-jan; Chang Kai-chen; Lee Ya-hsuan	Tennis	Women's Team - Classification	29 Aug
Gold	Wang Chi-lin; Lee Chia-hsin	Badminton	Mixed Doubles	29 Aug
Gold	Tai Tzu-ying	Badminton	Women's Singles	29 Aug
Gold	Wang Tzu-wei	Badminton	Men's Singles	29 Aug
Gold	Hsu Ya-ching; Wu Ti-jung	Badminton	Women's Doubles	29 Aug
Silver	Lin Kan-yu	Taekwondo	Women's Individual Poomsae	20 Aug
Silver	Ko Fu-shiuan	Roller Sports	Men's 10,000m elimination races	21 Aug
Silver	Li Meng-chu	Roller Sports	Women's 10,000m elimination races	21 Aug
Silver	Kao Mao-chieh	Roller Sports	Men's 300m time trial	21 Aug
Silver	Chen Ying-chu	Roller Sports	Women's 300m time trial	21 Aug
Silver	Chen Yi-hsuan; Lee Ying-hsian; Chen Hsiang-ting	Taekwondo	Women's Team Poomsae	21 Aug
Silver	Chang Wei-chieh; Hsieh Ming-yang; Huang Chia-juang	Taekwondo	Men's Team Poomsae	21 Aug
Silver	Ko Fu-shiuan	Roller Sports	Men's 15,000m elimination races	22 Aug
Silver	Li Meng-chu	Roller Sports	Women's 15,000m elimination races	22 Aug
Silver	Ko Fu-shiuan	Roller Sports	Men's 1000 metres sprint	22 Aug
Silver	Li Meng-chu	Roller Sports	Women's 1000 metres sprint	22 Aug
Silver	Chen Yi-hsuan	Archery	Women's Compound individual	23 Aug
Silver	Chuang Chia-chia	Taekwondo	Women's -67kg	23 Aug
Silver	Deng Yu-cheng; Peng Shih-cheng; Wei Chun-heng	Archery	Men's Recurve team	24 Aug
Silver	Le Chien-ying; Peng Chia-mao; Tan Ya-ting	Archery	Women's Recurve team	24 Aug
Silver	Tan Ya-ting	Archery	Women's Recurve individual	24 Aug
Silver	Chen Yu-chi	Roller Sports	Men's Speed slalom	25 Aug
Silver	Wang Jia-wei	Roller Sports	Women's Speed slalom	25 Aug
Silver	Chen Shih-chieh	Weightlifting	Men's +105 kg	25 Aug
Silver	Li Meng-chu	Roller Sports	Women's Marathon	26 Aug
Silver	Huang Yu-jen; Liu Wei-ting; Yang Tsung-yeh; Ho Chia-hsin	Taekwondo	Men's Team Kyorugi	26 Aug
Silver	Chen Chieh	Athletics	400 metres hurdles	26 Aug
Silver	Hou Yu-sang	Golf	Women's Individual	27 Aug
Silver	Chen Hsuan	Golf	Women's Individual	27 Aug
Silver	Hou Yu-sang; Chen Hsuan; Chen Chih-min	Golf	Women's team	27 Aug
Silver	Chen Kuei-ru	Athletics	110 metres hurdles	27 Aug
Silver	Chen Yu-wei	Wushu	Men's Taolu - Taijiquan / Taijijian	28 Aug
Silver	Chen Yi-ying	Wushu	Women's Taolu - Taijiquan / Taijijian	28 Aug
Silver	Wang Hsi-Lin; Kung Yun]; Yang Chian-mei; Ku Ni-chen; Hsu Tzu-chi; Chen Pei-an	Gymnastics	Women's Group all-around	28 Aug
Silver	Cheng I-ching	Table Tennis	Women's Doubles	29 Aug
Silver	Lee Ya-hsuan	Tennis	Women's Singles	29 Aug
Silver	Chen Chien-an	Table Tennis	Men's Singles	29 Aug
Silver	Wang Hsi-Lin; Kung Yun]; Yang Chian-mei; Ku Ni-chen; Hsu Tzu-chi; Chen Pei-an	Gymnastics	Women's Group 3 balls + 2 ropes	29 Aug
Silver	Lin Yi-ju	Wushu	Women's sanda - 60kg	29 Aug
Bronze	Chen Chien-chuan	Taekwondo	Men's Individual Poomsae	20 Aug
Bronze	Kao Chan-Hung	Weightlifting	Men's 62kg	20 Aug
Bronze	Chiang Nien-hsin	Weightlifting	Women's 63kg	22 Aug
Bronze	Chen Hsiang-hsuan; Chen Yi-hsuan	Archery	Mixed Compound team	23 Aug
Bronze	Yang Ho-chen	Roller Sports	Women's 500m sprint	23 Aug
Bronze	Liu Wei-ting	Taekwondo	Men's -80kg	23 Aug
Bronze	Yang Tsung-yeh	Taekwondo	Men's -74kg	24 Aug
Bronze	Yao Chi-ling	Weightlifting	Women's 75kg	24 Aug
Bronze	Lo Ying-yuan	Weightlifting	Women's 90kg	25 Aug
Bronze	Wu Dong-yan	Roller Sports	Men's Speed slalom	25 Aug
Bronze	Hsiang Chun-hsien	Athletics	High jump	25 Aug
Bronze	Chen Szu-yu; Cheng Hsien-tzu; Cheng I-ching; Lin Chia-chih; Liu Yu-hsin	Table Tennis	Women's Team	25 Aug
Bronze	Chen Chien-an; Chiang Hung-chieh; Lee Chia-sheng; Liao Cheng-ting; Sun Chia-hung	Table Tennis	Men's Team	25 Aug
Bronze	Huang Shih-feng	Athletics	Men's Javelin	26 Aug
Bronze	Liao Cheng-ting; Chen Szu-yu	Table Tennis	Mixed Doubles	27 Aug
Bronze	Liu Yung-hua; Lai Chia-i; Kevin Yu	Golf	Men's Team	27 Aug
Bronze	Kevin Yu	Golf	Men's Individual	27 Aug
Bronze	Liu Yung-hua	Golf	Men's Individual	27 Aug
Bronze	Chang Kai-chen	Tennis	Men's Individual	28 Aug
Bronze	Chan Yung-jan; Hsieh Cheng-peng	Tennis	Mixed Doubles	28 Aug
Bronze	Yang Chun-han; Wei Yi-ching; Cheng Po-yu; Chen Chia-hsun; Wu Er-chang; Yeh Shou-po	Athletics	Men's 4x100m Relay	28 Aug
Bronze	Lo Pin; Chen Yen-yu; Chen Wei-an; Yang Cing; Hsu Yu-lien; Han Ya-en; Wang Wei-lin; Huang Hsiang-ting; Cheng I-hsiu; Huang Ling-chuan; Lin Yu-ting; Chu Yu-chin	Basketball	Women's Team	28 Aug
Bronze	Chen Wei-ting	Wushu	Women's Sanda - 52kg	29 Aug
Bronze	Chiang Hung-chieh; Chen Chien-an	Table Tennis	Men's Doubles	29 Aug
Bronze	Lee Chia-sheng; Liao Cheng-ting	Table Tennis	Men's Doubles	29 Aug
Bronze	Lee Yang; Hsu Ya-ching	Badminton	Mixed Doubles	29 Aug
Bronze	Lee Jhe-huei; Lee Yang	Badminton	Men's Doubles	29 Aug
Bronze	Chiang Mei-hui	Badminton	Women's Singles	29 Aug

=== Demonstration Sports ===
Medal	Athlete(s)	Sport	Event	Date
Gold	Hsu Jui-an	Billiards	Men's single 9-ball	27 Aug
Gold	Ku Cheng-chin	Billiards	Women's single 9-ball	27 Aug
Gold	Wei Tzu-chien; Kuo Szu-ting	Billiards	Women's double 9-ball	29 Aug
Gold	Ko Ping-chung; Ko Pin-yi	Billiards	Men's double 9-ball	29 Aug
Silver	Lin Cheng-chieh	Billiards	Men's single 9-ball	27 Aug
Bronze	Wu Zhi-ting	Billiards	Women's single 9-ball	27 Aug
