= Athletics at the 2017 Summer Universiade – Women's half marathon =

The women's half marathon event at the 2017 Summer Universiade was held on 27 August at the Taipei Municipal Stadium.

== Medalists ==
=== Individual ===
Gold	Silver	Bronze
Yuki Munehisa; Japan	Esma Aydemir; Turkey	Saki Fukui; Japan

=== Team ===
Gold	Silver	Bronze
Japan; Yuki Munehisa; Saki Fukui; Kanade Furuya; Maki Izumida; Kasumi Yamaguchi	Turkey; Esma Aydemir; Sevilay Eytemiş; Sebahat Akpınar; Fatma Demir; Büşra Nur Koku	Chinese Taipei; Tsao Chun-yu; You Ya-jyun; Chen Yu-hsuan; Chang Chih-hsuan

== Results ==
=== Individual ===
Rank	Name	Nationality	Time	Notes
1st place, gold medalist(s)	Yuki Munehisa	Japan	1:13:48	
2nd place, silver medalist(s)	Esma Aydemir	Turkey	1:14:28	
3rd place, bronze medalist(s)	Saki Fukui	Japan	1:14:37	
4	Kanade Furuya	Japan	1:15:10	
5	Maki Izumida	Japan	1:16:24	
6	Fabienne Amrhein	Germany	1:17:10	
7	Sevilay Eytemiş	Turkey	1:18:25	
8	Valdilene Silva	Brazil	1:18:29	
9	Hua Shaoqing	China	1:18:33	
10	Tsao Chun-yu	Chinese Taipei	1:19:05	
11	Kasumi Yamaguchi	Japan	1:21:55	
12	You Ya-jyun	Chinese Taipei	1:21:57	
13	Sebahat Akpınar	Turkey	1:22:20	
14	Fatma Demir	Turkey	1:23:41	
15	Letitia Saayman	South Africa	1:23:57	
16	Büşra Nur Koku	Turkey	1:24:01	
17	Yin Anna	China	1:24:24	
18	Chen Yu-hsuan	Chinese Taipei	1:24:50	
19	Evelyne Dietschi	Switzerland	1:25:34	
20	Klara Ljubi	Slovenia	1:26:27	
21	Liu Qinghong	China	1:27:27	
22	Chang Chih-hsuan	Chinese Taipei	1:31:27	
23	Thembi Baloyi	South Africa	1:37:26	
24	Zhu Lin	China	1:37:57	
	Jeong Dae-un	South Korea	DNF	
	Tanya Scott	South Africa	DNF	
	Xia Yuyu	China	DNF	
	Claudia Cornejo	Bolivia	DNS	

=== Team ===
Rank	Team	Time	Notes
1st place, gold medalist(s)	Japan	3:43:35	
2nd place, silver medalist(s)	Turkey	3:55:13	
3rd place, bronze medalist(s)	Chinese Taipei	4:05:52	
4	China	4:10:24	
	South Africa	DNF	
