= Roller sports at the 2017 Summer Universiade =

Roller Sports at the XXIX Summer Universiade
- Venue: Yingfeng Riverside Park Roller Sports Rink (A); Ren' ai Road, Taipei City (Start: Ketagalan Boulevard) (Marathon)
- Dates: 21–26 August 2017
- Competitors: 104 from 18 nations

Roller Sports were contested at the 2017 Summer Universiade from August 21 to 26 at the Yingfeng Riverside Park Roller Sports Rink (A) and Ren'ai Road, Taipei City, (start: Ketagalan Boulevard) for the marathon in Taipei, Taiwan.

== Participating nations ==
- Austria (3)
- Belarus (1)
- China (1)
- Chinese Taipei (16)
- Colombia (11)
- Czech Republic (4)
- Germany (6)
- Hong Kong (3)
- Hungary (5)
- Italy (9)
- Japan (6)
- Mexico (2)
- New Zealand (1)
- Russia (16)
- Singapore (1)
- Slovenia (2)
- South Korea (13)
- Switzerland (4)

== Medal summary ==
=== Medal table ===
Rank	Nation	Gold	Silver	Bronze	Total
1	Chinese Taipei*	10	11	2	23
2	South Korea	4	2	5	11
3	Colombia	1	3	7	11
4	China	1	0	0	1
5	Italy	0	0	1	1
5	Russia	0	0	1	1
Totals (6 entries)		16	16	16	48

=== Men's events ===
Event	Gold		Silver		Bronze	
300 metres time trial	Kim Jin-young; South Korea	23.949	Kao Mao-chieh; Chinese Taipei	24.371	Hong Seung-gi; South Korea	24.452
500 metres sprint	Hong Seung-gi; South Korea	39.936	César Enrique Nunez Almanza; Colombia	39.959	Jaime Rodrigo Uribe Mogollon; Colombia	40.033
1000 metres sprint	Huang Yu-lin; Chinese Taipei	1:24.020	Ko Fu-shiuan; Chinese Taipei	1:24.476	Jeong Byeong-kwan; South Korea	1:24.520
10,000 metres elimination races	Chen Yan-cheng; Chinese Taipei	20	Ko Fu-shiuan; Chinese Taipei	13	Carlos Esteban Pérez Canaval; Colombia	10
15,000 metres elimination races	Carlos Ivan Franco Perez; Colombia	24:09.630	Ko Fu-shiuan; Chinese Taipei	24:09.763	Carlos Esteban Pérez Canaval; Colombia	24:09.999
3000 metres relay	Chinese Taipei (TPE); Kao Mao-chieh; Sung Ching-yang; Huang Yu-lin; Chen Yan-cheng	4:04.432	South Korea (KOR); Kim Jin-young; Choi Gwang-ho; Jeong Byeong-kwan; Lee Sang-cheol	4:04.447	Colombia (COL); Johan Sebastian Cabrera Orjuela; Carlos Esteban Pérez Canaval; Carlos Ivan Franco Perez; César Enrique Nunez Almanza	4:04.512
Marathon	Choi Gwang-ho; South Korea	1:07:15.138	Carlos Esteban Pérez Canaval; Colombia	1:07:15.163	Giuseppe Bramante; Italy	1:07:15.228
Speed slalom	Pan Yushuo; China		Chen Yu-chi; Chinese Taipei		Wu Dong-yan; Chinese Taipei	

=== Women's events ===
Event	Gold		Silver		Bronze	
300 metres time trial	An Yi-seul; South Korea	25.805	Chen Ying-chu; Chinese Taipei	25.828	Shin So-yeong; South Korea	26.570
500 metres sprint	Chen Ying-chu; Chinese Taipei	43.739	María Fernanda Timms; Colombia	43.802	Yang Ho-chen; Chinese Taipei	52.462
1000 metres sprint	Yang Ho-chen; Chinese Taipei	1:34.805	Li Meng-chu; Chinese Taipei	1:34.884	An Yi-seul; South Korea	1:35.002
10,000 metres elimination races	Yang Ho-chen; Chinese Taipei	23	Li Meng-chu; Chinese Taipei	16	Yu Gar-am; South Korea	16
15,000 metres elimination races	Yang Ho-chen; Chinese Taipei	26:57.916	Li Meng-chu; Chinese Taipei	26:58.034	Maria Camila Gil Taborda; Colombia	26:58.964
3000 metres relay	Chinese Taipei (TPE); Chen Ying-chu; Li Meng-chu; Yang Ho-chen; Tsai Pin-hsuan	4:25.026	South Korea (KOR); An Yi-seul; Shin So-yeong; Park Min-jeong; Yu Gar-am	4:25.565	Colombia (COL); Karen Dayanna Restrepo Rengifo; Maria Camila Gil Taborda; Mayerly Amaya Villamizar; Maria Camila Guerra Guevara	4:28.157
Marathon	Yang Ho-chen; Chinese Taipei	1:27:43.622	Li Meng-chu; Chinese Taipei	1:27:43.705	Maria Camila Guerra Guevara; Colombia	1:27:44.399
Speed slalom	Liang Hsuan-min; Chinese Taipei		Wang Jia-wei; Chinese Taipei		Kristina Lysenko; Russia	
