= Chen Yu-hsuan =

Taiwanese long-distance runner

Personal information
- Born: 16 January 1993 (age 33)

Sport
- Sport: Track and field
- Event: Marathon

Chen Yu-hsuan (born 16 January 1993) is a Taiwanese long-distance runner who specialises in the marathon. She competed in the women's marathon event at the 2016 Summer Olympics.
