= Goh Yea Ching =

Malaysian badminton player (born 1996)

Goh Yea Ching 吴玥青
Personal information
- Born: 19 June 1996 (age 30) Cheras, Kuala Lumpur, Malaysia
- Height: 1.51 m (4 ft 11 in)

Sport
- Country: Malaysia
- Sport: Badminton
- Handedness: Right

Women's doubles
- Highest ranking: 65 (17 November 2016)
- BWF profile
Medal record
Women's badminton
Representing Malaysia
Summer Universiade
Silver medal – second place	2017 Taipei	Mixed doubles
Bronze medal – third place	2017 Taipei	Mixed team

Goh Yea Ching
- Traditional Chinese: 吳玥青
- Simplified Chinese: 吴玥青
- Hanyu Pinyin: Wú Yuèqīng
- Jyutping: Ng4 Jyut6 Ceng1
- Hokkien POJ: Gô͘ Goa̍t-chheng
- Tâi-lô: Gôo Gua̍t-tshing

Goh Yea Ching (born 19 June 1996) is a Malaysian badminton player.

== Career ==
In 2014, Goh won the Romanian International tournament in the women's doubles event. In 2016, she won Portugal International and became the runner-up of Romanian International tournament.

== Achievements ==
=== Summer Universiade ===
Mixed doubles
Year	Venue	Partner	Opponent	Score	Result
2017	Taipei Gymnasium; Taipei, Taiwan	(Malaysia) Nur Mohd Azriyn Ayub	(Chinese Taipei) Wang Chi-lin (Chinese Taipei) Lee Chia-hsin	21–12, 16–21, 14–21	Silver

=== BWF International Challenge/Series ===
Women's doubles
Year	Tournament	Partner	Opponent	Score	Result
2014	Romanian International	(Malaysia) Cheah Yee See	(Denmark) Josephine van Zaane (Sweden) Emma Wengberg	11–4, 11–10, 11–10	(gold) Winner
2016	Portugal International	(Malaysia) Peck Yen Wei	(England) Chloe Birch (England) Sarah Walker	21–9, 21–15	(gold) Winner
2016	Romanian International	(Malaysia) Peck Yen Wei	(England) Jessica Pugh (Netherlands) Cheryl Seinen	19–21, 15–21	(silver) Runner-up
2016	India International Series	(Malaysia) Lim Chiew Sien	(Malaysia) Joyce Choong (Malaysia) Lim Jee Lynn	11–6, 11–7, 6–11, 11–7	(gold) Winner
2018	Finnish Open	(Malaysia) Yap Cheng Wen	(Japan) Asumi Kugo (Japan) Megumi Yokoyama	24–22, 15–21, 13–21	(silver) Runner-up

BWF International Challenge tournament
BWF International Series tournament
BWF Future Series tournament
