= Lee Chia-hsin =

Taiwanese badminton player (born 1997)

Lee Chia-hsin 李佳馨
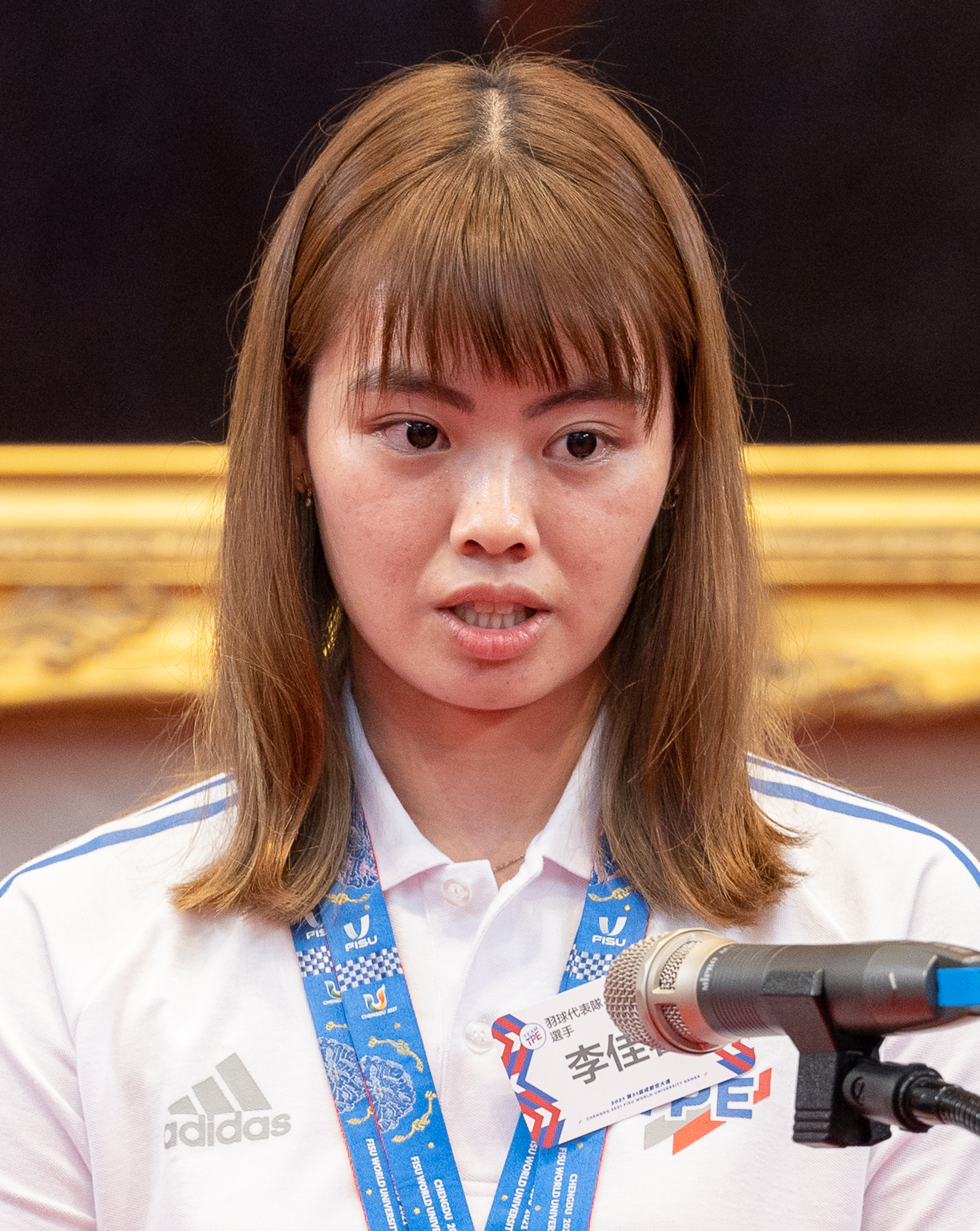
- Lee in 2023

Personal information
- Born: 14 May 1997 (age 29) Taipei, Taiwan
- Height: 1.71 m (5 ft 7 in)

Sport
- Country: Republic of China (Taiwan)
- Sport: Badminton
- Handedness: Right

Women's & mixed doubles
- Highest ranking: 25 (WS, 2 February 2018); 20 (WD with Teng Chun-hsun, 23 May 2023); 10 (XD with Wang Chi-lin, 21 June 2018); 10 (XD with Ye Hong-wei, 11 June 2024)
- Current ranking: 29 (XD with Wu Guan-xun, 27 October 2026)
- BWF profile
Medal record
Women's badminton
Representing Chinese Taipei
World University Games
| Gold medal – first place | 2017 Taipei | Mixed doubles |
| Gold medal – first place | 2017 Taipei | Mixed team |
| Gold medal – first place | 2021 Chengdu | Mixed doubles |
| Gold medal – first place | 2021 Chengdu | Mixed team |
World Junior Championships
| Bronze medal – third place | 2015 Lima | Girls' doubles |
| Bronze medal – third place | 2015 Lima | Mixed team |
Asian Junior Championships
| Bronze medal – third place | 2014 Taipei | Mixed team |
Representing (International Olympic Committee) Mixed-NOCs
Youth Olympic Games
| Silver medal – second place | 2014 Nanjing | Mixed doubles |

Lee Chia-hsin (Chinese: 李佳馨; pinyin: Lǐ Jiāxīn; born 14 May 1997) is a Taiwanese badminton player. She won her first international title at the 2013 Polish International in the women's doubles event partnered with Wu Ti-jung. Lee was the gold medalists at the 2017 Summer Universiade in the mixed doubles and team events.

== Achievements ==
=== World University Games ===
Mixed doubles
| Year | Venue | Partner | Opponent | Score | Result |
|---|---|---|---|---|---|
| 2017 | Taipei Gymnasium; Taipei, Taiwan | (Chinese Taipei) Wang Chi-lin | (Malaysia) Nur Mohd Azriyn Ayub (Malaysia) Goh Yea Ching | 12–21, 21–16, 21–14 | Gold |
| 2021 | Shuangliu Sports Centre Gymnasium; Chengdu, China | (Chinese Taipei) Ye Hong-wei | (Chinese Taipei) Lee Fang-chih (Chinese Taipei) Teng Chun-hsun | 21–15, 21–17 | Gold |

=== Youth Olympic Games ===
Mixed doubles
| Year | Venue | Partner | Opponent | Score | Result |
|---|---|---|---|---|---|
| 2014 | Nanjing Sport Institute; Nanjing, China | (Japan) Kanta Tsuneyama | (Malaysia) Cheam June Wei (Hong Kong) Ng Tsz Yau | 14–21, 21–23 | Silver |

=== BWF World Junior Championships ===
Girls' doubles
| Year | Venue | Partner | Opponent | Score | Result |
|---|---|---|---|---|---|
| 2015 | Centro de Alto Rendimiento de la Videna; Lima, Peru | (Chinese Taipei) Chen Wan-ting | (China) Chen Qingchen (China) Jia Yifan | 9–21, 13–21 | Bronze |

=== BWF World Tour (3 titles, 1 runner-up) ===
The BWF World Tour, which was announced on 19 March 2017 and implemented in 2018, is a series of elite badminton tournaments sanctioned by the Badminton World Federation (BWF). The BWF World Tours are divided into levels of World Tour Finals, Super 1000, Super 750, Super 500, Super 300 (part of the HSBC World Tour), and the BWF Tour Super 100.

Mixed doubles
| Year | Tournament | Level | Partner | Opponent | Score | Result |
|---|---|---|---|---|---|---|
| 2018 | New Zealand Open | Super 300 | (Chinese Taipei) Wang Chi-lin | (South Korea) Seo Seung-jae (South Korea) Chae Yoo-jung | 21–19, 14–21, 21–19 | (gold) Winner |
| 2022 | Canada Open | Super 100 | (Chinese Taipei) Ye Hong-wei | (Japan) Hiroki Midorikawa (Japan) Natsu Saito | 12–21, 21–12, 21–15 | (gold) Winner |
| 2023 | Orléans Masters | Super 300 | (Chinese Taipei) Ye Hong-wei | (Malaysia) Chen Tang Jie (Malaysia) Toh Ee Wei | 19–21, 17–21 | (silver) Runner-up |
| 2023 | U.S. Open | Super 300 | (Chinese Taipei) Ye Hong-wei | (Denmark) Mathias Thyrri (Denmark) Amalie Magelund | 13–21, 21–6, 21–18 | (gold) Winner |

=== BWF Grand Prix (1 runner-up) ===
The BWF Grand Prix had two levels, the Grand Prix and Grand Prix Gold. It was a series of badminton tournaments sanctioned by the Badminton World Federation (BWF) and played between 2007 and 2017.

Mixed doubles
| Year | Tournament | Partner | Opponent | Score | Result |
|---|---|---|---|---|---|
| 2017 | Chinese Taipei Open | (Chinese Taipei) Wang Chi-lin | (South Korea) Seo Seung-jae (South Korea) Kim Ha-na | 20–22, 10–21 | (silver) Runner-up |

BWF Grand Prix Gold tournament
BWF Grand Prix tournament

=== BWF International Challenge/Series (16 titles, 1 runner-up) ===
Women's singles
| Year | Tournament | Opponent | Score | Result |
|---|---|---|---|---|
| 2014 | Auckland International | (Chinese Taipei) Chiang Mei-hui | 8–11, 11–4, 11–8, 5–11, 11–5 | (gold) Winner |
| 2015 | Auckland International | (Chinese Taipei) Sung Shuo-yun | 21–14, 21–17 | (gold) Winner |

Women's doubles
| Year | Tournament | Partner | Opponent | Score | Result |
|---|---|---|---|---|---|
| 2013 | Polish International | (Chinese Taipei) Wu Ti-jung | (Chinese Taipei) Chiang Mei-hui (Chinese Taipei) Hsu Ya-ching | 21–10, 21–16 | (gold) Winner |
| 2020 | Slovak Open | (Chinese Taipei) Lin Jhih-yun | (Chinese Taipei) Hsieh Pei-shan (Chinese Taipei) Wu Ti-jung | 21–18, 21–18 | (gold) Winner |
| 2022 | Slovak Open | (Chinese Taipei) Teng Chun-hsun | No competitors | Walkover | (gold) Winner |
| 2022 | Polish Open | (Chinese Taipei) Teng Chun-hsun | (Hong Kong) Yeung Nga Ting (Hong Kong) Yeung Pui Lam | 9–21, 18–21 | (silver) Runner-up |
| 2022 | Austrian Open | (Chinese Taipei) Teng Chun-hsun | (Denmark) Julie Finne-Ipsen (Denmark) Mai Surrow | 21–19, 15–21, 21–10 | (gold) Winner |
| 2022 | Bendigo International | (Chinese Taipei) Teng Chun-hsun | (Chinese Taipei) Chang Ching-hui (Chinese Taipei) Yang Ching-tun | 19–21, 22–20, 21–14 | (gold) Winner |

Mixed doubles
| Year | Tournament | Partner | Opponent | Score | Result |
|---|---|---|---|---|---|
| 2014 | Auckland International | (Chinese Taipei) Lee Chia-han | (Netherlands) Ruud Bosch (Chinese Taipei) Shuai Pei-ling | 11–6, 11–6, 11–8 | (gold) Winner |
| 2015 | Auckland International | (Chinese Taipei) Lee Chia-han | (Chinese Taipei) Wu Yuan-cheng (Chinese Taipei) Chang Hsin-tien | 21–8, 21–15 | (gold) Winner |
| 2016 | Sydney International | (Chinese Taipei) Yang Ming-tse | (South Korea) Jung Young-keun (South Korea) Kim Na-young | 21–13, 22–20 | (gold) Winner |
| 2022 | Portugal International | (Chinese Taipei) Ye Hong-wei | (Germany) Jan Colin Völker (Germany) Stine Küspert | 21–10, 19–21, 21–9 | (gold) Winner |
| 2022 | Polish Open | (Chinese Taipei) Ye Hong-wei | (Poland) Paweł Śmiłowski (Poland) Wiktoria Adamek | 22–20, 21–17 | (gold) Winner |
| 2022 | Austrian Open | (Chinese Taipei) Ye Hong-wei | (Chinese Taipei) Su Li-wei (Chinese Taipei) Chang Ching-hui | 21–16, 23–21 | (gold) Winner |
| 2025 | Slovenia Open | (Chinese Taipei) Wu Guan-xun | (Indonesia) Patra Harapan Rindorindo (Indonesia) Az Zahra Ditya Ramadhani | 21–19, 21–13 | (gold) Winner |
| 2025 | Sydney International | (Chinese Taipei) Wu Guan-xun | (Chinese Taipei) Chen Bo-yuan (Chinese Taipei) Sung Yi-hsuan | 15–10, 15–11 | (gold) Winner |
| 2025 | Bendigo International | (Chinese Taipei) Wu Guan-xun | (Chinese Taipei) Chen Hung-ming (Chinese Taipei) Chang Yun-jung | 21–9, 21–8 | (gold) Winner |

BWF International Challenge tournament
BWF International Series tournament
BWF Future Series tournament
