= Japan at the 2017 Summer Universiade =

- IOC code: JPN
- NOC: Japanese Olympic Committee
- Website: www.joc.or.jp/english/ (in English)

in Taipei, Taiwan 19 – 30 August 2017
- Competitors: 336 in 22 sports
- Medals Ranked 1st: Gold 37 Silver 27 Bronze 37 Total 101

Summer Universiade appearances (overview)
- 1959; 1961; 1963; 1965; 1967; 1970; 1973; 1975; 1977; 1979; 1981; 1983; 1985; 1987; 1989; 1991; 1993; 1995; 1997; 1999; 2001; 2003; 2005; 2007; 2009; 2011; 2013; 2015; 2017; 2019; 2021; 2025; 2027

Japan participated at the 2017 Summer Universiade, in Taipei, Taiwan.

== Medal by sports ==
Medals by sport
Sport	1st place, gold medalist(s)	2nd place, silver medalist(s)	3rd place, bronze medalist(s)	Total
Athletics	7	2	7	16
Badminton	0	3	2	5
Baseball	1	0	0	1
Basketball	0	1	0	1
Diving	0	0	1	1
Fencing	2	1	2	5
Football	1	1	0	2
Golf	1	1	0	2
Artistic gymnastics	2	4	6	12
Rhythmic gymnastics	0	1	1	2
Judo	10	2	4	16
Swimming	9	6	5	20
Table tennis	3	3	1	7
Tennis	1	1	3	5
Volleyball	0	1	1	2
Water polo	0	0	1	1
Weightlifting	0	0	1	1
Wushu	0	0	2	2
Total	37	27	37	101

Medals by demonstration sport
Sport	1st place, gold medalist(s)	2nd place, silver medalist(s)	3rd place, bronze medalist(s)	Total
Billiards	0	1	0	1
Total	0	1	0	1

== Medalists ==
Medal	Name	Sport	Event	Date
Gold	Yui Ohashi	Swimming	Women's 400 metre individual medley	20 August
Gold	Kenta Chiba; Tomomasa Hasegawa; Yuya Kamoto; Shogo Nonomura; Wataru Tanigawa	Gymnastics Artistic	Men's artistic team all-around	20 August
Gold	Kokoro Kageura	Judo	Men's +100 kg	20 August
Gold	Aimi Nouchi	Judo	Women's 63 kg	21 August
Gold	Kosuke Hagino	Swimming	Men's 200 metre individual medley	22 August
Gold	Kanako Watanabe	Swimming	Women's 100 metre breaststroke	22 August
Gold	Arata Tatsukawa	Judo	Men's 73 kg	22 August
Gold	Rina Tatsukawa	Judo	Women's 52 kg	22 August
Gold	Nao Horomura	Swimming	Men's 200 metre butterfly	23 August
Gold	Yui Ohashi	Swimming	Women's 200 metre individual medley	23 August
Gold	Shogo Nonomura	Gymnastics Artistic	Men's parallel bars	23 August
Gold	Taikoh Fujisaka	Judo	Men's 60 kg	23 August
Gold	Mai Umekita	Judo	Women's 48 kg	23 August
Gold	Hyoga Ota	Judo	Men's open weight	23 August
Gold	Akari Inoue	Judo	Women's open weight	23 August
Gold	Kanako Watanabe	Swimming	Women's 200 metre breaststroke	24 August
Gold	Taikoh Fujisaka; Norihito Isoda; Arata Tatsukawa; Sotaro Fujiwara; Shoichiro Mukai; Kentaro Iida; Kokoro Kageura; Hyoga Ota	Judo	Men's team	24 August
Gold	Mai Umekita; Rina Tatsukawa; Yui Murai; Aimi Nouchi; Saki Niizoe; Mao Izumi; Maiko Inoue; Akari Inoue	Judo	Women's team	24 August
Gold	Katsuhiro Matsumoto; Reo Sakata; Yuki Kobori; Kosuke Hagino	Swimming	Men's 4 x 200 metre freestyle relay	25 August
Gold	Kyosuke Matsuyama; Toshiya Saito; Takahiro Shikine; Ryohei Noguchi	Fencing	Men's team foil	25 August
Gold	Misaki Emura; Risa Takashima; Shihomi Fukushima; Ayaka Mukae	Fencing	Women's team sabre	25 August
Gold	Daiya Seto	Swimming	Men's 400 metre individual medley	26 August
Gold	Anna Konishi; Kanako Watanabe; Yukina Hirayama; Chihiro Igarashi	Swimming	Women's 4 x 100 metre medley relay	26 August
Gold	Toshikazu Yamanishi	Athletics	Men's 20 kilometres walk	26 August
Gold	Toshikazu Yamanishi; Fumitaka Oikawa; Tomohiro Noda	Athletics	Men's 20 kilometres walk team	26 August
Gold	Kazuki Higa; Daiki Imano; Takumi Kanaya	Golf	Men's team	26 August
Gold	Kei Katanishi	Athletics	Men's half marathon	27 August
Gold	Kei Katanishi; Naoki Kudo; Kengo Suzuki; Wataru Tochigi; Takato Suzuki	Athletics	Men's half marathon team	27 August
Gold	Yuki Munehisa	Athletics	Women's half marathon	27 August
Gold	Yuki Munehisa; Saki Fukui; Kanade Furuya; Maki Izumida; Kasumi Yamaguchi	Athletics	Women's half marathon team	27 August
Gold	Yusuke Tanaka; Shuhei Tada; Sho Kitagawa; Jun Yamashita	Athletics	Men's 4 × 100 metres relay	28 August
Gold	Masataka Morizono; Yuya Oshima	Table tennis	Men's doubles	28 August
Gold	Ayami Narumoto; Rei Yamamoto	Table tennis	Women's doubles	28 August
Gold	Masataka Morizono	Table tennis	Men's singles	29 August
Gold	Erina Hayashi; Kaito Uesugi	Tennis	Mixed doubles	29 August
Gold	Takumi Nagaishi; Ryosuke Kojima; Keisuke Saka; Junya Suzuki; Naomasa Iwasaki; Daiki Miya; Katsuya Iwatake; Yuta Koike; Ryuho Kikuchi; Takuya Shigehiro; Hidemasa Morita; Yasuto Wakizaka; Temma Matsuda; Sachiro Toshima; Kai Shibato; Shintaro Nago; Kaoru Mitoma; Ryo Germain; Seiya Nakano; Reo Hatate	Football	Men's tournament	29 August
Gold	Haruki Takemura; Hiromasa Saito; Daiki Sakamoto; Katsuki Sakamoto; Ryoya Aoshima; Masashi Ito; Ryoji Kuribayashi; Masato Morishita; Wataru Matsumoto; Tatsuki Ohira; Ryo Kobayashi; Hiroki Obata; Takahiro Kumagai; Taishi Kusumoto; Takeshi Miyamoto; Yoshiaki Watanabe; Keita Nakagawa; Tiju Utsumi; Kairi Shimada; Masaki Iwami; Ryosuke Tatsumi; Yoshitaka Nagasawa	Baseball	Men's tournament	29 August
Silver	Kentaro Iida	Judo	Men's 100 kg	20 August
Silver	Kosuke Hagino	Swimming	Men's 100 metres backstroke	21 August
Silver	Saki Niizoe	Judo	Women's 70 kg	21 August
Silver	Daiya Seto	Swimming	Men's 200 metre individual medley	22 August
Silver	Reona Aoki	Swimming	Women's 100 metre breaststroke	22 August
Silver	Shogo Nonomura	Gymnastics Artistic	Men's artistic individual all-around	22 August
Silver	Asuka Teramoto	Gymnastics Artistic	Women's artistic individual all-around	22 August
Silver	Kyosuke Matsuyama	Fencing	Men's individual foil	22 August
Silver	Daiya Seto	Swimming	Men's 200 metre butterfly	23 August
Silver	Asuka Teramoto	Gymnastics Artistic	Women's floor	23 August
Silver	Natsumi Sasada	Gymnastics Artistic	Women's balance beam	23 August
Silver	Marina Saito	Athletics	Women's javelin throw	25 August
Silver	Yu Igarashi; Miki Kashihara; Miyuki Kato; Ririka Katsumata; Sho Kawabata; Kenya Mitsuhashi; Rena Miyaura; Kenta Nishimoto; Shuhei Ozeki; Natsumi Shimoda; Ayaho Sugino; Katsuki Tamate	Badminton	Mixed team	25 August
Silver	Kosuke Hagino	Swimming	Men's 400 metre individual medley	26 August
Silver	Katsumi Nakamura	Swimming	50 metre freestyle	26 August
Silver	Kazuki Higa	Golf	Men's individual	26 August
Silver	Masataka Morizono; Yuya Oshima; Tonin Ryuzaki; Masaki Yoshida; Kazuhiro Yoshimura	Table tennis	Men's team	26 August
Silver	Minami Ando; Reiko Ikegami; Ayami Narumoto; Rika Suzuki; Rei Yamamoto	Table tennis	Women's team	26 August
Silver	Naoki Kudo	Athletics	Men's half marathon	27 August
Silver	Kazuhiro Yoshimura; Minami Ando	Table tennis	Mixed doubles	27 August
Silver	Midori Murayama; Manami Fujioka; Mirai Tamura; Shiori Yasuma; Nozomi Kato; Saki Hayashi; Yuriko Tsumura; Nichika Taniguchi; Mamiko Tanaka; Mina Ogasawara; Tamami Nakada; Aki Fujimoto	Basketball	Women's tournament	28 August
Silver	Momoka Oda; Yūka Imamura; Nao Muranaga; Mika Shibata; Shiori Tsukada; Manami Kojima; Misaki Yamauchi; Arisa Inoue; Ayaka Sugi; Haruka Maruo; Kasumi Nojima; Mami Yokota	Volleyball	Women's tournament	28 August
Silver	Yui Kitsuki; Yukari Morita; Arisa Matsubara; Natsuki Yamakawa; Chisa Okugawa; Saki Matsunaga; Saatsuki Miura; Yui Yamada; Mako Kudo; Mie Umezu; Mizuki Nakamura; Mizuki Hirakuni; Yuki Mizutani; Chihiro Yamaguchi; Rio Takizawa; Sayaka Ryu; Shioka Kumagai; Juri Kawano; Mayu Otake; Mizuki Horie	Football	Women's tournament	28 August
Silver	Kenta Nishimoto	Badminton	Men's singles	29 August
Silver	Katsuki Tamate; Kenta Nishimoto	Badminton	Men's doubles	29 August
Silver	Shintaro Imai; Yuya Ito; Kaito Uesugi	Tennis	Men's team classification	29 August
Silver	Yukari Narimatsu; Asuka Ono; Ayano Sato; Nana Kondo; Nanase Hori; Natsumi Morino	Gymnastics Rhythmic	Group 5 hoops	29 August
Bronze	Maiko Inoue	Judo	Women's +78 kg	20 August
Bronze	Yukina Hirayama	Swimming	Women's 50 metre butterfly	21 August
Bronze	Yumika Nakamura; Natsumi Sasada; Asuka Teramoto; Ayana Tone; Yuki Uchiyama	Gymnastics Artistic	Women's artistic team all-around	21 August
Bronze	Shoichiro Mukai	Judo	Men's 90 kg	21 August
Bronze	Masaru Yamada	Fencing	Men's individual épée	21 August
Bronze	Masanori Miyamoto	Weightlifting	Men's 69 kg	21 August
Bronze	Wataru Tanigawa	Gymnastics Artistic	Men's artistic individual all-around	22 August
Bronze	Norihito Isoda	Judo	Men's 66 kg	22 August
Bronze	Yui Murai	Judo	Women's 57 kg	22 August
Bronze	Misaki Emura	Fencing	Women's individual sabre	22 August
Bronze	Anna Konishi	Swimming	Women's 100 metre backstroke	23 August
Bronze	Chihiro Igarashi; Rika Omoto; Wakaba Tsuyuuchi; Yui Ohashi	Swimming	Women's 4 x 200 metre freestyle relay	23 August
Bronze	Ai Hosoda	Athletics	Women's 10,000 metres	23 August
Bronze	Wataru Tanigawa	Gymnastics Artistic	Men's floor	23 August
Bronze	Tomomasa Hasegawa	Gymnastics Artistic	Men's pommel horse	23 August
Bronze	Wataru Tanigawa	Gymnastics Artistic	Men's parallel bars	23 August
Bronze	Wataru Tanigawa	Gymnastics Artistic	Men's horizontal bar	23 August
Bronze	Katsumi Nakamura	Swimming	100 metre freestyle	24 August
Bronze	Kazuya Shiojiri	Athletics	Men's 10,000 metres	24 August
Bronze	Ryoma Yamamoto	Athletics	Men's triple jump	25 August
Bronze	Fumitaka Oikawa	Athletics	Men's 20 kilometres walk	26 August
Bronze	Kosuke Hagino; Mamoru Mori; Yuki Kobori; Katsumi Nakamura	Swimming	Men's 4 x 100 metre medley relay	26 August
Bronze	Kengo Suzuki	Athletics	Men's half marathon	27 August
Bronze	Saki Fukui	Athletics	Women's half marathon	27 August
Bronze	Yuka Mabuchi; Hana Kaneto; Haruka Enomoto	Diving	Women's team classification	27 August
Bronze	Ayaka Honda	Wushu	Women's changquan	27 August
Bronze	Sayaka Takeuchi; Mizuki Nakamura; Ichiko Iki; Miyu Maeyama	Athletics	Women's 4 × 100 metres relay	28 August
Bronze	Minami Ando; Rika Suzuki	Table tennis	Women's doubles	28 August
Bronze	Shintaro Imai; Kaito Uesugi	Tennis	Men's doubles	28 August
Bronze	Erina Hayashi; Robu Kajitani	Tennis	Women's doubles	28 August
Bronze	Yu Igarashi	Badminton	Men's singles	29 August
Bronze	Miyuki Kato; Miki Kashihara	Badminton	Women's doubles	29 August
Bronze	Erina Hayashi; Haruka Kaji; Robu Kajitani; Risa Ushijima	Tennis	Women's team classification	29 August
Bronze	Takana Tatsuzawa	Gymnastics Rhythmic	Individual ribbon	29 August
Bronze	Yoshitaka Asayama	Wushu	Men's nanquan	29 August
Bronze	Naoya Takano; Takahiko Imamura; Kenya Fujinaka; Taichi Fukuyama; Shohei Yamaguchi; Yasunari Kodama; Tomohiro Yamamoto; Tsubasa Hisahara; Kosuke Hata; Keisuke Sakai; Yutaka Ogihara; Yuma Watanabe	Volleyball	Men's tournament	29 August
Bronze	Miyuu Aoki; Yumi Arima; Yuri Kazama; Aoi Saito; Chiaki Sakanoue; Minori Yamamoto; Akari Inaba; Yuki Niizawa; Kana Hosoya; Misaki Noro; Marina Tokumoto; Kotori Suzuki; Minami Shioya	Water polo	Women's tournament	29 August

=== Demonstration ===
Medal	Name	Sport	Event	Date
Silver	Takayuki Shishido; Kengo Suzuki	Billiards	Men's doubles 9-ball	29 August
