= Iran at the FISU World University Games =

Iran first participated at the Universiade in 1973, and has sent athletes to some editions of Summer Universiade.

== Medals by Games ==
Games	Gold	Silver	Bronze	Total	Rank
(Soviet Union) 1973 Moscow	0	4	0	4	18
(Bulgaria) 1977 Sofia	0	0	1	1	22
(South Korea) 2003 Daegu	0	2	2	4	32
(Turkey) 2005 İzmir	2	6	4	12	19
(Thailand) 2007 Bangkok	4	1	4	9	13
(Serbia) 2009 Belgrade	5	2	1	8	11
(China) 2011 Shenzhen	1	4	3	8	33
(Russia) 2013 Kazan	2	4	3	9	26
(South Korea) 2015 Gwangju	7	2	6	15	9
(Taiwan) 2017 Taipei	8	4	11	23	10
(Italy) 2019 Naples	7	3	7	17	9
(China) 2021 Chengdu	5	6	12	23	11
Total	41	38	54	133	23

== Medals by sport ==
Sport	Gold	Silver	Bronze	Total
Archery	0	2	1	3
Athletics	3	1	0	4
Fencing	0	1	2	3
Judo	0	0	2	2
Rowing	0	1	0	1
Shooting	4	3	6	13
Taekwondo	25	17	31	73
Volleyball	1	0	0	1
Weightlifting	2	1	1	4
Wrestling	2	9	6	17
Wushu	4	3	5	12
Total	41	38	54	133

== List of medalists ==
=== Archery ===
Medal	Name	Games	Event
Silver	Yaser Amouei; Milad Rashidi; Omid Taheri	2017 Taipei	Men's team compound
Silver	Kiarash Farzan; Mohammad Saleh Palizban	2019 Naples	Men's team compound
Bronze	Reza Shabani	2021 Chengdu	Men's individual recurve

=== Athletics ===
Medal	Name	Games	Event
Gold	Ehsan Mohajer Shojaei	2007 Bangkok	Men's 800 m
Gold	Sajjad Moradi	2009 Belgrade	Men's 800 m
Gold	Mohammad Samimi	2009 Belgrade	Men's discus throw
Silver	Mahmoud Samimi	2009 Belgrade	Men's discus throw

=== Fencing ===
Medal	Name	Games	Event
Silver	Farzad Baher; Mohammad Fotouhi; Ali Pakdaman; Mohammad Rahbari	2017 Taipei	Men's team sabre
Bronze	Mohammad Fotouhi	2017 Taipei	Men's individual sabre
Bronze	Mohammad Rahbari	2017 Taipei	Men's individual sabre

=== Judo ===
Medal	Name	Games	Event
Bronze	Mostafa Dalirian	2007 Bangkok	Men's 60 kg
Bronze	Saeid Khosravinejad	2007 Bangkok	Men's +100 kg

=== Rowing ===
Medal	Name	Games	Event
Silver	Amir Hossein Mahmoudpour	2021 Chengdu	Men's lightweight single sculls

=== Shooting ===
Medal	Name	Games	Event
Gold	Najmeh Khedmati	2015 Gwangju	Women's 10 m air rifle
Gold	Mahlagha Jambozorg	2015 Gwangju	Women's 50 m rifle prone
Silver	Mahlagha Jambozorg; Najmeh Khedmati; Maryam Talebi	2015 Gwangju	Women's 50 m rifle 3 positions team
Bronze	Najmeh Khedmati	2015 Gwangju	Women's 50 m rifle 3 positions
Bronze	Maedeh Aminzadeh; Mahlagha Jambozorg; Najmeh Khedmati	2015 Gwangju	Women's 10 m air rifle team
Bronze	Mahlagha Jambozorg; Najmeh Khedmati; Maryam Talebi	2015 Gwangju	Women's 50 m rifle prone team
Gold	Dorsa Arabshahi	2019 Naples	Women's 10 m air pistol
Gold	Mahyar Sedaghat; Najmeh Khedmati	2019 Naples	Mixed 10 m air rifle team
Silver	Hadi Gharehbaghi; Amir Mohammad Nekounam; Mahyar Sedaghat	2019 Naples	Men's 10 m air rifle team
Silver	Hanieh Rostamian	2019 Naples	Women's 10 m air pistol
Bronze	Sajjad Pourhosseini	2019 Naples	Men's 10 m air pistol
Bronze	Laya Mohammadi; Hanieh Rostamian; Fatemeh Shekari	2021 Chengdu	Women's 10 m air pistol team
Bronze	Amitis Jafari; Laya Mohammadi; Hanieh Rostamian	2021 Chengdu	Women's 25 m pistol

=== Taekwondo ===
Medal	Name	Games	Event
Silver	Behzad Khodadad	2003 Daegu	Men's 62 kg
Silver	Ali Tajik	2003 Daegu	Men's 78 kg
Bronze	Soheil Molana	2003 Daegu	Men's 58 kg
Bronze	Hamid Sarabadani	2003 Daegu	Men's 84 kg
Silver	Majid Sajjadi	2005 İzmir	Men's 54 kg
Silver	Mohammad Bagheri Motamed	2005 İzmir	Men's 62 kg
Silver	Vahid Abdollahi	2005 İzmir	Men's 78 kg
Silver	Mehdi Navaei	2005 İzmir	Men's +84 kg
Bronze	Behzad Khodadad	2005 İzmir	Men's 58 kg
Bronze	Hamed Khamseh	2005 İzmir	Men's 84 kg
Gold	Mohammad Bagheri Motamed	2007 Bangkok	Men's 67 kg
Gold	Rouhollah Talebi	2007 Bangkok	Men's 78 kg
Gold	Yousef Karami	2007 Bangkok	Men's 84 kg
Silver	Alireza Nasr Azadani	2007 Bangkok	Men's 72 kg
Bronze	Navid Sajjadi	2007 Bangkok	Men's 62 kg
Bronze	Morteza Rostami	2007 Bangkok	Men's +84 kg
Gold	Alireza Nasr Azadani	2009 Belgrade	Men's 72 kg
Gold	Rouhollah Talebi	2009 Belgrade	Men's 78 kg
Gold	Mehran Askari	2009 Belgrade	Men's 84 kg
Silver	Hossein Tajik	2009 Belgrade	Men's +84 kg
Bronze	Sina Khalash; Ali Nadali; Hamid Nazari	2009 Belgrade	Men's team poomsae
Gold	Mehran Askari	2011 Shenzhen	Men's 80 kg
Silver	Hadi Mostaan	2011 Shenzhen	Men's 58 kg
Silver	Farzad Zolghadri	2011 Shenzhen	Men's 74 kg
Silver	Mahsa Mardani	2011 Shenzhen	Women's individual poomsae
Silver	Nastaran Maleki; Mahsa Mardani; Golsoum Mollamadadkhani	2011 Shenzhen	Women's team poomsae
Bronze	Ali Nadali	2011 Shenzhen	Men's individual poomsae
Bronze	Armin Akbari; Hossein Beheshti; Hamid Nazari	2011 Shenzhen	Men's team poomsae
Bronze	Rouhollah Talebi	2011 Shenzhen	Men's 87 kg
Gold	Armin Hadipour	2015 Gwangju	Men's 54 kg
Gold	Ahmad Khosrofar	2015 Gwangju	Men's 74 kg
Gold	Saeid Rajabi	2015 Gwangju	Men's 80 kg
Gold	Omid Amidi	2015 Gwangju	Men's 87 kg
Gold	Akram Khodabandeh	2015 Gwangju	Women's +73 kg
Silver	Mehdi Jamali	2015 Gwangju	Men's individual poomsae
Bronze	Javad Amiri	2015 Gwangju	Men's 58 kg
Bronze	Mehran Askari	2015 Gwangju	Men's +87 kg
Bronze	Bahareh Ghaderian; Fatemeh Ghasemi; Marjan Salahshouri	2015 Gwangju	Women's team poomsae
Gold	Armin Hadipour	2017 Taipei	Men's 54 kg
Gold	Hadi Tiran	2017 Taipei	Men's 58 kg
Gold	Mirhashem Hosseini	2017 Taipei	Men's 63 kg
Gold	Saeid Rajabi	2017 Taipei	Men's 87 kg
Silver	Ramin Hosseingholizadeh	2017 Taipei	Men's 74 kg
Bronze	Mehdi Jamali	2017 Taipei	Men's individual poomsae
Bronze	Mehdi Jamali; Mohammad Javad Kheiri; Amir Reza Mehraban	2017 Taipei	Men's team poomsae
Bronze	Fatemeh Hesam	2017 Taipei	Women's individual poomsae
Bronze	Nahid Kiani	2017 Taipei	Women's 53 kg
Bronze	Melika Mirhosseini	2017 Taipei	Women's 67 kg
Bronze	Amir Reza Mehraban; Mahsa Sadeghi	2017 Taipei	Mixed pair poomsae
Gold	Armin Hadipour	2019 Naples	Men's 58 kg
Gold	Soroush Ahmadi	2019 Naples	Men's 63 kg
Gold	Mirhashem Hosseini	2019 Naples	Men's 68 kg
Gold	Amir Mohammad Bakhshi	2019 Naples	Men's 74 kg
Gold	Soroush Ahmadi; Amir Mohammad Bakhshi; Mirhashem Hosseini; Erfan Nazemi	2019 Naples	Men's team kyorugi
Bronze	Kourosh Bakhtiar	2019 Naples	Men's individual poomsae
Bronze	Kourosh Bakhtiar; Amir Reza Mehraban; Ali Sohrabi	2019 Naples	Men's team poomsae
Bronze	Fatemeh Hesam	2019 Naples	Women's individual poomsae
Bronze	Fatemeh Hesam; Marjan Salahshouri; Marjan Taji	2019 Naples	Women's team poomsae
Bronze	Melika Mirhosseini	2019 Naples	Women's 73 kg
Bronze	Amir Reza Mehraban; Marjan Salahshouri	2019 Naples	Mixed pair poomsae
Gold	Mehdi Haji Mousaei	2021 Chengdu	Men's 54 kg
Gold	Alireza Hosseinpour	2021 Chengdu	Men's 58 kg
Gold	Mirhashem Hosseini	2021 Chengdu	Men's 74 kg
Gold	Nahid Kiani	2021 Chengdu	Women's 53 kg
Silver	Arian Salimi	2021 Chengdu	Men's 87 kg
Silver	Mehran Barkhordari; Mirhashem Hosseini; Alireza Hosseinpour; Arian Salimi	2021 Chengdu	Men's team kyorugi
Silver	Anahita Tavakkoli	2021 Chengdu	Women's +73 kg
Bronze	Morteza Zendehdel	2021 Chengdu	Men's individual poomsae
Bronze	Reza Jalalifar; Ali Mousania; Morteza Zendehdel	2021 Chengdu	Men's team poomsae
Bronze	Mehran Barkhordari	2021 Chengdu	Men's 80 kg
Bronze	Yasaman Limouchi	2021 Chengdu	Women's individual poomsae
Bronze	Yasaman Limouchi; Reihaneh Omrani; Mobina Sharifi	2021 Chengdu	Women's team poomsae
Bronze	Narges Mirnourollahi	2021 Chengdu	Women's 62 kg

=== Volleyball ===
Medal	Name	Games	Event
Gold	Akbar Valaei; Mohammad Fallah; Amir Ali Mohammadfathali; Ghasem Karkhaneh; Mohammad Reza Moazzen; Saeid Shiroud; Armin Ranjbar; Behzad Heidari; Ali Yousefpour; Farhad Piroutpour; Mohammad Taher Vadi; Hadi Barshan	2017 Taipei	Men

=== Weightlifting ===
Medal	Name	Games	Event
Gold	Jaber Behrouzi	2013 Kazan	Men's 69 kg
Gold	Rasoul Taghian	2013 Kazan	Men's 77 kg
Silver	Bahador Molaei	2013 Kazan	Men's +105 kg
Bronze	Kia Ghadami	2017 Taipei	Men's 105 kg

=== Wrestling ===
Medal	Name	Games	Event
Silver	Hossein Bitarafan	1973 Moscow	Men's freestyle 48 kg
Silver	Ghadir Nokhodchi	1973 Moscow	Men's freestyle 52 kg
Silver	Mohsen Farahvashi	1973 Moscow	Men's freestyle 57 kg
Silver	Mohammad Reza Navaei	1973 Moscow	Men's freestyle 62 kg
Bronze	Dariush Vaezi	1977 Sofia	Men's freestyle 57 kg
Gold	Hadi Habibi	2005 İzmir	Men's freestyle 74 kg
Gold	Ali Ashkani	2005 İzmir	Men's Greco-Roman 60 kg
Silver	Majid Khodaei	2005 İzmir	Men's freestyle 84 kg
Silver	Hassan Rangraz	2005 İzmir	Men's Greco-Roman 55 kg
Bronze	Abbas Biglarbeigi	2005 İzmir	Men's freestyle 60 kg
Bronze	Mehdi Sharabiani	2005 İzmir	Men's Greco-Roman 120 kg
Silver	Behnam Ehsanpour	2013 Kazan	Men's freestyle 60 kg
Silver	Hadi Alizadeh	2013 Kazan	Men's Greco-Roman 74 kg
Silver	Amir Aliakbari	2013 Kazan	Men's Greco-Roman 120 kg
Bronze	Mohammad Hossein Mohammadian	2013 Kazan	Men's freestyle 84 kg
Bronze	Parviz Hadi	2013 Kazan	Men's freestyle 120 kg
Bronze	Mehdi Aliyari	2013 Kazan	Men's Greco-Roman 96 kg

=== Wushu ===
Medal	Name	Games	Event
Gold	Erfan Ahangarian	2017 Taipei	Men's sanda 60 kg
Gold	Jafar Shirzadeh	2017 Taipei	Men's sanda 70 kg
Gold	Hamid Reza Ladvar	2017 Taipei	Men's sanda 80 kg
Silver	Arezoo Salimi	2017 Taipei	Women's sanda 52 kg
Bronze	Amir Mohammadrezaei	2017 Taipei	Men's daoshu and gunshu
Bronze	Fatemeh Heidari	2017 Taipei	Women's nanquan and nandao
Gold	Mohammad Hosseini	2021 Chengdu	Men's gunshu
Silver	Hamid Reza Sahandi	2021 Chengdu	Men's sanda 70 kg
Silver	Ali Khorshidi	2021 Chengdu	Men's sanda 80 kg
Bronze	Shahin Banitalebi	2021 Chengdu	Men's nanquan
Bronze	Shoja Panahi	2021 Chengdu	Men's sanda 60 kg
Bronze	Mohana Rahimi	2021 Chengdu	Women's sanda 60 kg

== See also ==
- Iran at the Olympics
- Iran at the Asian Games
