= Iran at the 2017 Summer Universiade =

- IOC code: IRI
- NOC: National Olympic Committee of the Islamic Republic of Iran
- Website: http://www.olympic.ir/

in Taipei, Taiwan 19 – 30 August 2017
- Competitors: 62 in 8 sports
- Medals Ranked 10th: Gold 8 Silver 4 Bronze 11 Total 23

Summer Universiade appearances (overview)
- 1973; 1975; 1977; 1979–2001; 2003; 2005; 2007; 2009; 2011; 2013; 2015; 2017; 2019; 2021; 2025; 2027

Iran participated at the 2017 Summer Universiade in Taipei, Taiwan.

== Medal summary ==
=== Medals by sport ===
Medals by sport
Sport	1st place, gold medalist(s)	2nd place, silver medalist(s)	3rd place, bronze medalist(s)	Total
Archery	0	1	0	1
Fencing	0	1	2	3
Taekwondo	4	1	6	11
Volleyball	1	0	0	1
Weightlifting	0	0	1	1
Wushu	3	1	2	6
Total	8	4	11	23

=== Archery ===
Medal	Name	Games	Event
Silver	Yaser Amouei; Milad Rashidi; Omid Taheri	2017 Taipei	Men's compound team

=== Fencing ===
Medal	Name	Games	Event
Silver	Mohammad Fotouhi; Mohammad Rahbar; Ali Pakdaman; Farzad Baher Arasbaran	2017 Taipei	Men's sabre team
Bronze	Mohammad Fotouhi	2017 Taipei	Men's sabre individual
Bronze	Mohammad Rahbari	2017 Taipei	Men's sabre individual

=== Taekwondo ===
Medal	Name	Games	Event
Gold	Armin Hadipour	2017 Taipei	Men's 54kg
Gold	Hadi Tiranvalipour	2017 Taipei	Men's 58kg
Gold	Mirhashem Hosseini	2017 Taipei	Men's 63kg
Gold	Saeid Rajabi	2017 Taipei	Men's 87kg
Silver	Ramin Hosseingholizadeh	2017 Taipei	Men's 74kg
Bronze	Mahdi Jamali Fashi	2017 Taipei	Men's individual freestyle poomsae
Bronze	Melika Mirhosseini	2017 Taipei	Women's 67kg
Bronze	Nahid Kiyani	2017 Taipei	Women's 53kg
Bronze	Fatemeh Hesam	2017 Taipei	Women's individual freestyle poomsae
Bronze	Mahdi Jamali Fashi; Mohammadjavad kheiri Amirreza Mehraban	2017 Taipei	Men's team poomsae
Bronze	Amirreza Mehraban; Mahsa Sadeghi	2017 Taipei	Mixed pair poomsae

=== Volleyball ===
Medal	Name	Games	Event
Gold	Akbar Valaei; Mohammad Fallah; Amirali Mohammadfathali; Ghasem Karkhaneh; Mohammad Reza Moazzen; Saeid Shiroodghorbani; Armin Ranjbar; Behzad Heidarishahi; Ali Yousefpoor; Farhad Piroutpour; Mohammad Taher Vadi; Hadi Barshan	2017 Taipei	Men's volleyball

=== Weightlifting ===
Medal	Name	Games	Event
Bronze	Kia Ghadami	2017 Taipei	Men's 105kg

=== Wushu ===
Medal	Name	Games	Event
Gold	Erfan Ahangarian	2017 Taipei	Men's sanda 60kg
Gold	Jafar Shirzadeh	2017 Taipei	Men's sanda 70kg
Gold	Hamid Reza Ladvar	2017 Taipei	Men's sanda 80kg
Silver	Arezou Salimi	2017 Taipei	Women's sanda 52kg
Bronze	Amir Mohammadrezaei	2017 Taipei	Men's taolu-Daoshu & Gunshu
Bronze	Fatemeh Heidari	2017 Taipei	Women's taolu-Nanquan & Nandao

== Archery ==
=== Men ===
Athlete	Event	Qualification round		1/24 Round	1/16 Round	1/8 Round	1/4 Round	1/2 Round	Medal Round	Rank
Athlete	Event	Score	Seed	Opposition Score	Opposition Score	Opposition Score	Opposition Score	Opposition Score	Opposition Score	Rank
Yaser Amouei	Men's compound individual	689	11	Bye	Santiago Nicola Regnasco (ARG); W141-137	Demir Elmaagacli (TUR); L140-147	Did not advance			9
Milad Rashidi	Men's compound individual	687	16	Samuel Alexande Hudson (NZL); W144-137	Quentin Louis R Baraer (FRA); L142-144	Did not advance				17
Omid Taheri	Men's compound individual	686	19	Amirul Amin Abd Rahim (MAS); W141-134	Evren Cagiran (TUR); L142_143	Did not advance				17
Yaser Amouei; Milad Rashidi; Omid Taheri	Men's compound team	2062	5	—N/a		Germany (GER); W213-203	Turkey (TUR); W223-217	South Korea (KOR); W222-222	Russia (RUS); L227-232	Silver

=== Women ===
Athlete	Event	Qualification round		1/24 Round	1/16 Round	1/8 Round	1/4 Round	1/2 Round	Medal Round	Rank
Athlete	Event	Score	Seed	Opposition Score	Opposition Score	Opposition Score	Opposition Score	Opposition Score	Opposition Score	Rank
Fereshteh Ghorbani	Women's compound individual	682	9	Bye	Prabhjot Kaur (IND); W137-135	Sarah Prieels (BEL); L141-143	Did not advance			9
Afsaneh Shafiei	Women's compound individual	664	31	Wan Li Yee (HKG); W134-133	Yesim Bostan (TUR); L136-141	Did not advance				17
Shiva Bakhtiari	Women's compound individual	658	37	Ecem Cansu Coskun (TUR); L141-145	Did not advance					33
Shiva Bakhtiari; Fereshteh Ghorbani; Afsaneh Shafiei	Women's compound team	2004	9	—N/a		Malaysia (MAS); W218-195	South Korea (KOR); L216-222	Did not advance		5

=== Mixed ===
Athlete	Event	Qualification round		1/24 Round	1/16 Round	1/8 Round	1/4 Round	1/2 Round	Medal Round	Rank
Athlete	Event	Score	Seed	Opposition Score	Opposition Score	Opposition Score	Opposition Score	Opposition Score	Opposition Score	Rank
Yaser Amouei; Fereshteh Ghorbani	Mixed compound team	1371	5	—N/a		Kazakhstan (KAZ); W151-145	Chinese Taipei (TPE); L146-148	Did not advance		5

== Badminton ==
=== Women ===
Athlete	Event	Round of 64	Round of 32	Round of 16	Quarter-final	Semi-final	Final
Athlete	Event	Opposition Score	Opposition Score	Opposition Score	Opposition Score	Opposition Score	Opposition Score
Sorayya Aghaei	Singles	Hannaliina Piho (EST); W2-0	Yap Rui Chen (MAS); L1-2	Did not advance			
Sara Delavari	Singles	Brittney Shanno Tam (CAN); L0-2	Did not advance				
Sorayya Aghaei; Sara Delavari	Doubles	France (FRA); L1-2	Did not advance				

== Fencing ==
=== Men ===
Fencer	Event	Round of 64	Round of 32	Round of 16	Quarter-final	Semi-final	Final	Rank
Fencer	Event	Opposition Score	Opposition Score	Opposition Score	Opposition Score	Opposition Score	Opposition Score	Rank
Mohammad Fotouhi	Individual sabre	Jakub Ocinski (POL); W15-11	Karol Metryka (USA); W15-13	Edward Barloy (FRA); W15-9	Anatoliy Kostenko (RUS); W15-13	Enver Yildirim (TUR); L15-11	Did not advance	Bronze
Mohammad Rahbari	Individual sabre	Bye	Sebestyen Puy (HUN); W15-9	Farzad Baher Arasbaran (IRI); W15-9	Jean-Philippe Patrice (FRA); W15-8	Andras Szatmari (HUN); L15-8	Did not advance	Bronze
Farzad Baher Arasbaran	Individual sabre	Madalin Bucur (ROU); W15-10	Miklos Pech (HUN); W15-11	Mohammad Rahbari (IRI); L15-9	Did not advance			14
Ali Pakdaman	Individual sabre	Bye	Turiy Tsap (UKR); L15-12	Did not advance				19
Mohammad Rahbari; Mohammad Fotouhi; Ali Pakdaman; Farzad Baher Arasbaran	Team sabre	—N/a			Japan (JPN); W45-20	Russia (RUS); W45-41	South Korea (KOR); L45-30	Silver

=== Women ===
Fencer	Event	Round of 64	Round of 32	Round of 16	Quarter-final	Semi-final	Final	Rank
Fencer	Event	Opposition Score	Opposition Score	Opposition Score	Opposition Score	Opposition Score	Opposition Score	Rank
Najmeh Sazanjian	Individual sabre	Bye	Anastasia Bazhenova (RUS); L14-15	Did not advance				17
Parimah Barzegar	Individual sabre	Anastasia Bazhenova (RUS); L10-15	Did not advance					40
Kiana Bagherzadeh	Individual sabre	Did not advance						45
Najmeh Sazanjian; Parimah Barzegar; Kiana Bagherzadeh	Team sabre	—N/a		Poland (POL); L44-45	Did not advance			10

== Judo ==
=== Men ===
Judoka	Event	1/32 Final	1/16 Final	1/8 Final	1/4 Final	Semifinal	Repechage 32	Repechage 16	Repechage 8	Repechage final	Medals
Judoka	Event	Opposition Result	Opposition Result	Opposition Result	Opposition Result	Opposition Result	Opposition Result	Opposition Result	Opposition Result	Opposition Result	Opposition Result
Hamid Reza Sajjadi Fard	Men's +100kg	—N/a	Anton Brachev (RUS); Lby ippon	Did not advance			—N/a	Arash Valizadeh Soofiani (USA); W by ippon	Benjamin Bachir Bouizgarne (GER); L by ippon	Did not advance	
Toraj Chenari	Men's 81kg	—N/a	Fernando Salazar Moreno (CHI); W by wazari	Ivan Petr (CZE); L by ippon	Did not advance		—N/a	Andranik Chaparyan (ARM); L by ippon	Did not advance		

== Taekwondo ==
=== Kyorugi ===
Athlete	Event	Round of 64	Round of 32	Round of 16	Quarterfinal	Semifinal	Final
Athlete	Event	Opposition Result	Opposition Result	Opposition Result	Opposition Result	Opposition Result	Opposition Result
Seyed Hossein Ehsani	Men's 68kg	William Jackson Iv (USA); W by score 27–1	Vladimir Aleksa Dalakliev (BUL); W by score 19–17	Boris Krasnov (RUS); L by golden point 2–5	Did not advance		
