= Fencing at the 2017 Summer Universiade – Men's individual sabre =

Men's individual sabre at the Universiade
- Venues: Taipei Nangang Exhibition Center
- Dates: 20 August 2017
- Competitors: 71 from 26 nations

Medalists
1st place, gold medalist(s)		András Szatmári	Hungary
2nd place, silver medalist(s)		Enver Yildirim	Turkey
3rd place, bronze medalist(s)		Mohammad Rahbari	Iran
3rd place, bronze medalist(s)		Mohammad Fotouhi	Iran

The men's individual sabre fencing event at the 2017 Summer Universiade was held 20 August at the Taipei Nangang Exhibition Center in Taipei, Taiwan.

== Pool Results ==
Qualified for Ranking Round

=== Pool 1 ===
#	Seed	Athlete	67	2	3	4	5	6	7	V#	M#	Ind.	TG	TR	Diff.	RP	RT
1	1	Gu Bon-gil (KOR)		V	V	V	V	V	V	6	6	1.000	30	11	19	1	2
2	22	Francesco D'Armiento (ITA)	D_{4}		V	D_{4}	V	V	V	4	6	0.67	28	17	11	2	20
3	23	Cyrus Chang Chi hin (HKG)	D_{1}	D_{3}		V	V	V	V	4	6	0.667	24	22	2	3	26
4	44	Lyuboslav Burnev (BUL)	D_{4}	V	D_{4}		D_{1}	V	V	3	6	0.500	24	22	2	4	37
5	45	George Iancu (ROU)	D_{0}	D_{2}	D_{1}	V		V	V	3	6	0.500	18	19	–1	5	39
6	66	Dharam Singh (IND)	D_{2}	D_{1}	D_{4}	D_{0}	D_{2}		V	1	6	0.167	14	27	–13	6	59
7	67	Diego Fernando Alegre (ARG)	D_{0}	D_{1}	D_{3}	D_{3}	D_{1}	D_{2}		0	6	0.000	10	30	–20	7	65

=== Pool 2 ===
#	Seed	Athlete	1	2	3	4	5	6	7	V#	M#	Ind.	TG	TR	Diff.	RP	RT
1	2	András Szatmári (HUN)		D_{4}	V	V	V	V	V	5	6	0.833	29	11	18	2	7
2	21	Dario Cavaliere (ITA)	V		V	V	V	V	V	6	6	1.000	30	12	18	1	3
3	24	Edern Annic (FRA)	D_{2}	D_{0}		V	V	V	V	4	6	0.667	22	18	4	3	25
4	43	Oleksandr Karakai (UKR)	D_{3}	D_{0}	D_{3}		V	V	V	3	6	0.500	21	23	–2	4	40
5	46	Johan De Jong Skierus (SWE)	D_{0}	D_{2}	D_{1}	D_{1}		D_{3}	D_{0}	0	6	0.000	7	30	–23	7	68
6	65	Javed Ahmed Chowdhary (IND)	D_{0}	D_{2}	D_{0}	D_{3}	V		D_{1}	1	6	0.167	11	28	–17	6	60
7	69	Gilbert Schwarz (AUT)	D_{1}	D_{4}	D_{4}	D_{4}	V	V		2	6	0.333	23	21	2	5	49

=== Pool 3 ===
#	Seed	Athlete	1	2	3	4	5	6	7	V#	M#	Ind.	TG	TR	Diff.	RP	RT
1	3	Oh Sang-uk (KOR)		D_{4}	D_{1}	V	V	V	V	4	6	0.667	25	17	8	3	23
2	20	Anatoliy Kostenko (RUS)	V		V	D_{3}	V	V	V	5	6	0.833	28	16	12	1	9
3	25	Remi Senegas (FRA)	V	D_{0}		V	V	V	D_{4}	4	6	0.667	24	16	8	4	24
4	41	Farzad Baher (IRI)	D_{4}	V	D_{3}		V	V	V	4	6	0.667	27	19	8	2	22
5	47	Alexander Wagner (SWE)	D_{0}	D_{1}	D_{1}	D_{1}		D_{2}	D_{0}	0	6	0.000	5	30	–25	7	70
6	64	Norihiro Shimizu (JPN)	D_{2}	D_{2}	D_{1}	D_{2}	V		D_{3}	1	6	0.167	15	27	–12	6	58
7	68	Sebestyén Puy (HUN)	D_{1}	D_{4}	V	D_{3}	V	V		3	6	0.500	23	22	1	5	38

=== Pool 4 ===
#	Seed	Athlete	1	2	3	4	5	6	7	V#	M#	Ind.	TG	TR	Diff.	RP	RT
1	4	Ali Pakdaman (IRI)		V	V		V	V	V	5	5	1.000	25	10	15	1	4
2	19	Oleksiy Statsenko (UKR)	D_{3}		D_{3}		D_{2}	V	V	2	5	0.400	18	16	2	4	41
3	26	Benjamin Natanzon (USA)	D_{4}	V			V	V	V	4	5	0.800	24	13	11	2	15
4	42	Pancho Paskov (BUL)														DNF	
5	48	Chou Tsung-yu (TPE)	D_{1}	V	D_{4}			V	V	3	5	0.600	20	18	2	3	31
6	63	Max Korlinge (SWE)	D_{1}	D_{0}	D_{0}		D_{3}		D_{0}	0	5	0.000	4	25	–21	6	66
7	70	Wong Tzer Chyuan (MAS)	D_{1}	D_{1}	D_{1}		D_{3}	V		1	5	0.200	11	20	–9	5	54

=== Pool 5 ===
#	Seed	Athlete	1	2	3	4	5	6	7	V#	M#	Ind.	TG	TR	Diff.	RP	RT
1	5	Kim Jun-ho (KOR)		D_{4}	V	D_{0}	V	V	V	4	6	0.667	24	15	9	3	21
2	18	Kaito Streets (JPN)	V		V	D_{4}	V	V	V	5	6	0.833	29	14	15	2	8
3	27	Sergey Aniskov (KAZ)	D_{3}	D_{3}		D_{2}	V	V	V	3	6	0.500	23	17	6	4	36
4	40	Karol Metryka (USA)	V	V	V		V	V	V	6	6	1.000	30	6	24	1	1
5	49	William Campbell (AUS)	D_{1}	D_{0}	D_{0}	D_{0}		D_{3}	D_{3}	0	6	0.000	7	30	–23	7	68
6	62	Fauzan Novriansyah (INA)	D_{0}	D_{2}	D_{2}	D_{0}	V		V	2	6	0.333	14	25	–11	5	50
7	71	Pravin Kumar Ganware (IND)	D_{1}	D_{0}	D_{0}	D_{0}	V	D_{2}		1	6	0.167	8	28	–20	6	61

=== Pool 6 ===
#	Seed	Athlete	1	2	3	4	5	6	V#	M#	Ind.	TG	TR	Diff.	RP	RT
1	6	Mohammad Rahbari (IRI)		V	V	V	V	V	5	5	1.000	25	16	9	1	6
2	17	Edward Barloy (FRA)	D_{4}		V	V	V	V	4	5	0.800	24	13	11	2	15
3	29	Mădălin Bucur (ROU)	D_{4}	D_{2}		V	D_{2}	V	2	5	0.400	18	19	–1	4	43
4	38	Jakub Jaskot (POL)	D_{4}	D_{3}	D_{2}		D_{2}	V	1	5	0.200	16	23	–7	5	52
5	50	Jang Tea-hoon (KOR)	D_{1}	D_{2}	V	V		V	3	5	0.600	18	15	3	3	30
6	61	Shi Zhehao (CHN)	D_{3}	D_{1}	D_{2}	D_{3}	D_{1}		0	5	0.000	10	25	–15	6	62

=== Pool 7 ===
#	Seed	Athlete	1	2	3	4	5	6	V#	M#	Ind.	TG	TR	Diff.	RP	RT
1	7	Ilya Motorin (RUS)		D_{2}	V	V	V	V	4	5	0.800	22	13	9	2	18
2	16	Riccardo Nuccio (ITA)	V		D_{4}	V	V	V	4	5	0.800	24	8	16	1	10
3	28	Jean-Philippe Patrice (FRA)	D_{4}	V		V	V	V	4	5	0.800	24	16	8	3	19
4	36	Krzysztof Kaczkowski (POL)	D_{1}	D_{0}	D_{1}		D_{2}	D_{3}	0	5	0.000	7	25	–18	6	63
5	51	Mihai Crutu (ROU)	D_{2}	D_{1}	D_{4}	V		V	2	5	0.400	17	21	–4	4	47
6	60	Richard Henry Arfee Tarega (INA)	D_{1}	D_{0}	D_{2}	V	D_{4}		1	5	0.200	12	23	–11	5	55

=== Pool 8 ===
#	Seed	Athlete	1	2	3	4	5	6	V#	M#	Ind.	TG	TR	Diff.	RP	RT
1	8	Mohammad Fotouhi (IRI)		V	D_{3}	V	V	D_{2}	3	5	0.600	20	19	1	3	33
2	15	Jakub Ocinski (POL)	D_{4}		V	D_{1}	V	V	3	5	0.600	20	18	2	2	31
3	30	Peter Souders (USA)	V	D_{3}		V	V	D_{0}	3	5	0.600	18	21	–3	4	35
4	39	Andrey Gladkov (RUS)	D_{1}	V	D_{4}		D_{4}	D_{3}	1	5	0.200	17	21	–4	6	51
5	52	Sergiu Ciornila (ROU)	D_{4}	D_{1}	D_{4}	V		V	2	5	0.400	19	22	–3	5	46
6	59	Yuto Watanabe (JPN)	V	D_{4}	V	V	D_{3}		3	5	0.600	22	15	7	1	28

=== Pool 9 ===
#	Seed	Athlete	1	2	3	4	5	6	V#	M#	Ind.	TG	TR	Diff.	RP	RT
1	9	Enver Yildirim (TUR)		D_{3}	V	V	V	V	4	5	0.800	23	11	12	1	13
2	14	Nikolász Iliász (HUN)	V		D_{3}	V	V	V	4	5	0.800	23	11	12	1	13
3	31	Mikołaj Grzegorek (POL)	D_{2}	V		D_{1}	V	D_{4}	2	5	0.400	17	19	–2	5	45
4	37	Calvin Liang (USA)	D_{3}	D_{1}	V		V	D_{4}	2	5	0.400	18	19	–1	4	43
5	53	Wang Zicheng (CHN)	D_{1}	D_{0}	D_{1}	D_{3}		D_{1}	0	5	0.000	6	25	–19	6	64
6	58	Enrico Pezzi (BRA)	D_{0}	D_{2}	V	V	V		3	5	0.600	17	19	–2	3	34

=== Pool 10 ===
#	Seed	Athlete	1	2	3	4	5	6	V#	M#	Ind.	TG	TR	Diff.	RP	RT
1	10	Lorenzo Romano (ITA)		V	V	V	V	V	5	5	1.000	25	11	14	1	5
2	13	Stefano Ivan Lucchetti (ARG)	D_{3}		D_{1}	D_{3}	V	V	2	5	0.400	17	17	0	4	42
3	32	Bogdan Platonov (UKR)	D_{2}	V		D_{3}	V	V	3	5	0.600	20	11	9	3	27
4	35	Miklós Péch (HUN)	D_{4}	V	V		V	V	4	5	0.800	24	11	13	2	11
5	54	Muhammad Zuhdi (INA)	D_{0}	D_{1}	D_{0}	D_{0}		V	1	5	0.200	6	21	–15	5	56
6	57	Notum Walia (IND)	D_{2}	D_{1}	D_{0}	D_{0}	D_{1}		0	5	0.000	4	25	–21	6	66

=== Pool 11 ===
#	Seed	Athlete	1	2	3	4	5	6	V#	M#	Ind.	TG	TR	Diff.	RP	RT
1	11	Low Ho Tin (HKG)		V	V	D_{3}	V	V	4	5	0.800	23	10	13	1	12
2	12	Domenik Koch (GER)	D_{0}		V	D_{4}	D_{2}	V	2	5	0.400	16	21	–5	4	48
3	33	Yuriy Tsap (UKR)	D_{2}	D_{4}		V	V	V	3	5	0.600	21	16	5	3	29
4	34	Vasiliy Shirshov (RUS)	V	V	D_{4}		V	V	4	5	0.800	24	13	11	2	15
5	55	Nazarbay Sattarkhan (KAZ)	D_{3}	V	D_{2}	D_{0}		D_{4}	1	5	0.200	14	22	–8	5	53
6	56	Lu Yifeng (CHN)	D_{0}	D_{2}	D_{0}	D_{1}	V		1	5	0.200	8	24	–16	6	57

== Ranking Round ==
=== Section 1 ===
Round of 64
8	Mohammad Fotouhi (IRI)	15
15	Jakub Ocinski (POL)	11
26	Benjamin Natanzon (USA)	15
12	Domenik Koch (GER)	9
69	Gilbert Schwarz (AUT)	9
17	Edward Barloy (FRA)	15
19	Oleksiy Statsenko (UKR)	6
25	Remi Senegas (FRA)	15
24	Edern Annic (FRA)	15
43	Oleksandr Karakai (UKR)	11

Round of 32
40	Karol Metryka (USA)	13
8	Mohammad Fotouhi (IRI)	15
26	Benjamin Natanzon (USA)	7
17	Edward Barloy (FRA)	15
20	Anatoliy Kostenko (RUS)	15
25	Remi Senegas (FRA)	9
24	Edern Annic (FRA)	14
18	Kaito Streets (JPN)	15

Round of 16
8	Mohammad Fotouhi (IRI)	15
17	Edward Barloy (FRA)	9
20	Anatoliy Kostenko (RUS)	15
18	Kaito Streets (JPN)	14

Quarterfinal
8	Mohammad Fotouhi (IRI)	15
20	Anatoliy Kostenko (RUS)	13

=== Section 2 ===
Round of 64
44	Lyuboslav Burnev (BUL)	15
59	Yuto Watanabe (JPN)	14
5	Kim Jun-ho (KOR)	15
37	Calvin Liang (USA)	7
55	Nazarbay Sattarkhan (KAZ)	14
11	Low Ho Tin (HKG)	15
9	Enver Yildirim (TUR)	15
15	Jakub Jaskot (POL)	7
31	Mikołaj Grzegorek (POL)	15
22	Francesco D'Armiento (ITA)	12
33	Yuriy Tsap (UKR)	15
27	Sergey Aniskov (KAZ)	10

Round of 32
10	Lorenzo Romano (ITA)	15
44	Lyuboslav Burnev (BUL)	7
5	Kim Jun-ho (KOR)	15
11	Low Ho Tin (HKG)	8
9	Enver Yildirim (TUR)	15
31	Mikołaj Grzegorek (POL)	8
33	Yuriy Tsap (UKR)	15
4	Ali Pakdaman (IRI)	12

Round of 16
10	Lorenzo Romano (ITA)	11
5	Kim Jun-ho (KOR)	15
9	Enver Yildirim (TUR)	15
33	Yuriy Tsap (UKR)	14

Quarterfinal
5	Kim Jun-ho (KOR)	14
9	Enver Yildirim (TUR)	15

=== Section 3 ===
Round of 64
30	Peter Souders (USA)	15
50	Jang Tea-hoon (KOR)	9
28	Jean-Philippe Patrice (FRA)	15
52	Sergiu Ciornila (ROU)	6
39	Andrey Gladkov (RUS)	15
14	Nikolász Iliász (HUN)	14
29	Mădălin Bucur (ROU)	10
41	Farzad Baher (IRI)	15
32	Bogdan Platonov (UKR)	11
68	Sebestyén Puy (HUN)	15

Round of 32
21	Dario Cavaliere (ITA)	14
30	Peter Souders (USA)	15
28	Jean-Philippe Patrice (FRA)	14
39	Andrey Gladkov (RUS)	13
35	Miklós Péch (HUN)	11
41	Farzad Baher (IRI)	15
68	Sebestyén Puy (HUN)	9
6	Mohammad Rahbari (IRI)	15

Round of 16
30	Peter Souders (USA)	7
28	Jean-Philippe Patrice (FRA)	15
41	Farzad Baher (IRI)	9
6	Mohammad Rahbari (IRI)	15

Quarterfinal
28	Jean-Philippe Patrice (FRA)	8
6	Mohammad Rahbari (IRI)	15

=== Section 4 ===
Round of 64
45	George Iancu (ROU)	15
23	Cyrus Chang Chi hin (HKG)	9
3	Oh Sang-uk (KOR)	15
13	Stefano Ivan Lucchetti (ARG)	14
34	Vasiliy Shirshov (RUS)	15
62	Fauzan Novriansyah (INA)	5
51	Mihai Crutu (ROU)	9
7	Ilya Motorin (RUS)	15
48	Chou Tsung-yu (TPE)	15
58	Enrico Pezzi (BRA)	12

Round of 32
2	András Szatmári (HUN)	15
45	George Iancu (ROU)	9
3	Oh Sang-uk (KOR)	9
16	Riccardo Nuccio (ITA)	15
34	Vasiliy Shirshov (RUS)	8
7	Ilya Motorin (RUS)	15
48	Chou Tsung-yu (TPE)	6
1	Gu Bon-gil (KOR)	15

Round of 16
2	András Szatmári (HUN)	15
16	Riccardo Nuccio (ITA)	11
7	Ilya Motorin (RUS)	9
1	Gu Bon-gil (KOR)	15

Quarterfinal
2	András Szatmári (HUN)	15
1	Gu Bon-gil (KOR)	12

=== Quarterfinals ===
Quarterfinals
8	Mohammad Fotouhi (IRI)	15
20	Anatoliy Kostenko (RUS)	13
5	Kim Jun-ho (KOR)	14
9	Enver Yildirim (TUR)	15
28	Jean-Philippe Patrice (FRA)	8
6	Mohammad Rahbari (IRI)	15
2	András Szatmári (HUN)	15
1	Gu Bon-gil (KOR)	12

Semifinals
8	Mohammad Fotouhi (IRI)	11
9	Enver Yildirim (TUR)	15
6	Mohammad Rahbari (IRI)	8
2	András Szatmári (HUN)	15

Final
9	Enver Yildirim (TUR)	6
2	András Szatmári (HUN)	15

== Final ranking ==
Rank	Athlete	Results
1st place, gold medalist(s)	András Szatmári (HUN)	Champion
2nd place, silver medalist(s)	Enver Yildirim (TUR)	Runner-up
3rd place, bronze medalist(s)	Mohammad Rahbari (IRI)	Semifinals
3rd place, bronze medalist(s)	Mohammad Fotouhi (IRI)	Semifinals
5	Gu Bon-gil (KOR)	Quarterfinals
6	Anatoliy Kostenko (RUS)	Quarterfinals
7	Jean-Philippe Patrice (FRA)	Quarterfinals
8	Kim Jun-ho (KOR)	Quarterfinals
9	Lorenzo Romano (ITA)	Round of 16
10	Kaito Streets (JPN)	Round of 16
11	Riccardo Nuccio (ITA)	Round of 16
12	Edward Barloy (FRA)	Round of 16
13	Ilya Motorin (RUS)	Round of 16
14	Farzad Baher (IRI)	Round of 16
15	Yuriy Tsap (UKR)	Round of 16
16	Peter Souders (USA)	Round of 16
17	Karol Metryka (USA)	Round of 32
18	Dario Cavaliere (ITA)	Round of 32
19	Ali Pakdaman (IRI)	Round of 32
20	Miklós Péch (HUN)	Round of 32
21	Low Ho Tin (HKG)	Round of 32
22	Vasiliy Shirshov (RUS)	Round of 32
22	Benjamin Natanzon (USA)	Round of 32
24	Oh Sang-uk (KOR)	Round of 32
25	Remi Senegas (FRA)	Round of 32
26	Edern Annic (FRA)	Round of 32
27	Chou Tsung-yu (TPE)	Round of 32
28	Lyuboslav Burnev (BUL)	Round of 32
29	Sebestyén Puy (HUN)	Round of 32
30	George Iancu (ROU)	Round of 32
31	Mikołaj Grzegorek (POL)	Round of 32
32	Andrey Gladkov (RUS)	Round of 32
33	Nikolász Iliász (HUN)	Round of 64
34	Francesco D'Armiento (ITA)	Round of 64
35	Cyrus Chang Chi hin (HKG)	Round of 64
36	Bogdan Platonov (UKR)	Round of 64
37	Yuto Watanabe (JPN)	Round of 64
38	Jang Tea-hoon (KOR)	Round of 64
39	Jakub Ocinski (POL)	Round of 64
40	Enrico Pezzi (BRA)	Round of 64
41	Sergey Aniskov (KAZ)	Round of 64
42	Oleksandr Karakai (UKR)	Round of 64
43	Oleksiy Statsenko (UKR)	Round of 64
44	Stefano Ivan Lucchetti (ARG)	Round of 64
45	Mădălin Bucur (ROU)	Round of 64
46	Calvin Liang (USA)	Round of 64
47	Sergiu Ciornila (ROU)	Round of 64
48	Mihai Crutu (ROU)	Round of 64
49	Domenik Koch (GER)	Round of 64
50	Gilbert Schwarz (AUT)	Round of 64
51	Fauzan Novriansyah (INA)	Round of 64
52	Jakub Jaskot (POL)	Round of 64
53	Nazarbay Sattarkhan (KAZ)	Round of 64
54	Wong Tzer Chyuan (MAS)	Round of Pools
55	Richard Henry Arfee Tarega (INA)	Round of Pools
56	Muhammad Zuhdi (INA)	Round of Pools
57	Lu Yifeng (CHN)	Round of Pools
58	Norihiro Shimizu (JPN)	Round of Pools
59	Dharam Singh (IND)	Round of Pools
60	Javed Ahmed Chowdhary (IND)	Round of Pools
61	Pravin Kumar Ganware (IND)	Round of Pools
62	Shi Zhehao (CHN)	Round of Pools
63	Krzysztof Kaczkowski (POL)	Round of Pools
64	Wang Zicheng (CHN)	Round of Pools
65	Diego Fernando Alegre (ARG)	Round of Pools
66	Notum Walia (IND)	Round of Pools
66	Max Korlinge (SWE)	Round of Pools
68	Johan De Jong Skierus (SWE)	Round of Pools
68	William Campbell (AUS)	Round of Pools
70	Alexander Wagner (SWE)	Round of Pools
	Pancho Paskov (BUL)	DNF
