= 2017 World Taekwondo Championships – Men's bantamweight =

Taekwondo competition

Men's bantamweight at the 2017 World Championships
- Venue: Taekwondowon
- Dates: 29–30 June 2017
- Competitors: 87 from 87 nations

Medalists
gold medal	Zhao Shuai	China
silver medal	Mirhashem Hosseini	Iran
bronze medal	Bradly Sinden	Great Britain
bronze medal	Mahammad Mammadov	Azerbaijan

The men's bantamweight is a competition featured at the 2017 World Taekwondo Championships, and was held at the Taekwondowon in Muju County, South Korea on June 29 and June 30. Bantamweights were limited to a maximum of 63 kilograms in body mass.

== Results ==
Legend

- DQ — Won by disqualification
- P — Won by punitive declaration
- R — Won by referee stop contest
- W — Won by withdrawal

=== Finals ===
Quarterfinals		Semifinals		Final
Jaouad Achab (BEL)	11
Bradly Sinden (GBR)	13	Bradly Sinden (GBR)	29
Zhao Shuai (CHN)	27	Zhao Shuai (CHN)	43
Park Ji-min (KOR)	16			Zhao Shuai (CHN)	11
Mahammad Mammadov (AZE)	11			Mirhashem Hosseini (IRI)	5
Bolat Izutdinov (RUS)	7	Mahammad Mammadov (AZE)	5
Mirhashem Hosseini (IRI)	21	Mirhashem Hosseini (IRI)	6
Ho Chia-hsin (TPE)	7

=== Top half ===
==== Section 1 ====
Round of 128
Leyner Congo (ECU)	22
Joaquin Mendoza (PHI)	21
Abdulrazak Al-Hallak (SYR)	6
Damon Cavey (AUS)	32
Teddy Teng (FPO)	DQ
~~Stefan Biput (TTO)~~

Round of 64
Jaouad Achab (BEL)	25
Leyner Congo (ECU)	4
Issei Hamada (JPN)	20
Mohammad Assfour (JOR)	22
Jure Pantar (SLO)	20
Damon Cavey (AUS)	12
Teddy Teng (FPO)	3
Nutthawee Klompong (THA)	19^{P}

Round of 32
Jaouad Achab (BEL)	23
Mohammad Assfour (JOR)	10
Jure Pantar (SLO)	18
Nutthawee Klompong (THA)	11

Round of 16
Jaouad Achab (BEL)	18
Jure Pantar (SLO)	6

==== Section 2 ====
Round of 128
Aung Kyaw Kyaw (MYA)	11
Tin Wing Tai (HKG)	19
Mubarak Al-Shareef (KSA)	26^{P}
Alfred Madome (BOT)	15

Round of 64
Lucas Guzmán (ARG)	24
Tin Wing Tai (HKG)	3
Ng Chi Hou (MAC)	2
Bradly Sinden (GBR)	35^{W}
Davilani Cruz (BRA)	DQ
~~Jibreel Malik (GUY)~~
Mubarak Al-Shareef (KSA)	12
Jarosław Mecmajer (POL)	16

Round of 32
Lucas Guzmán (ARG)	7
Bradly Sinden (GBR)	9
Davilani Cruz (BRA)	13
Jarosław Mecmajer (POL)	8

Round of 16
Bradly Sinden (GBR)	22
Davilani Cruz (BRA)	1

==== Section 3 ====
Round of 128
Henrick Henry (SOL)	5
Hikmatullah Zain (AFG)	24^{P}
Sione Tufi (TGA)
Yauheni Heidzel (BLR)	W
Loveton Chea (LBR)	DQ
~~Romario Noka (ALB)~~

Round of 64
Youssef Aly (EGY)	37
Hikmatullah Zain (AFG)	19
Sebastián Navea (CHI)	9
Bernardo Pié (DOM)	8
Edwin Samson (NGR)	25
Yauheni Heidzel (BLR)	17
Loveton Chea (LBR)	3
Zhao Shuai (CHN)	19^{R}

Round of 32
Youssef Aly (EGY)	12
Sebastián Navea (CHI)	19
Edwin Samson (NGR)	12
Zhao Shuai (CHN)	33

Round of 16
Sebastián Navea (CHI)	15
Zhao Shuai (CHN)	16

==== Section 4 ====
Round of 128
Bir Bahadur Mahara (NEP)	3
Mitko Dzhordzhev (BUL)	26
Butrint Ejupi (KOS)	DQ
~~Idrisse Said Ali (COM)~~
Serghei Uscov (MDA)	DQ
~~Aleksandr Kuwarzin (TKM)~~

Round of 64
Ioannis Pilavakis (CYP)	10
Mitko Dzhordzhev (BUL)	4
Butrint Ejupi (KOS)	1
Alimzhan Serikbayev (KAZ)	18^{R}
Sandro Peer (AUT)	W
Jason Sam (MHL)
Serghei Uscov (MDA)	18
Park Ji-min (KOR)	34^{P}

Round of 32
Ioannis Pilavakis (CYP)	23
Alimzhan Serikbayev (KAZ)	30
Sandro Peer (AUT)	1
Park Ji-min (KOR)	25

Round of 16
Alimzhan Serikbayev (KAZ)	15
Park Ji-min (KOR)	36

=== Bottom half ===
==== Section 5 ====
Round of 128
Jordan Simara (SEY)	2
Sardor Toirov (UZB)	32
Royson Okwera (UGA)	DQ
~~Vincent Munyakazi (RWA)~~
Alvis Domínguez (PAN)	18
Rami Saleh (LBN)	16

Round of 64
Mahammad Mammadov (AZE)	10
Sardor Toirov (UZB)	3
Braulio León (PER)	10
Mactar Diao (SEN)	11
Vladyslav Yarmachek (UKR)	23
Royson Okwera (UGA)	3
Alvis Domínguez (PAN)	7
Nuno Costa (POR)	24

Round of 32
Mahammad Mammadov (AZE)	26
Mactar Diao (SEN)	6
Vladyslav Yarmachek (UKR)	12
Nuno Costa (POR)	18

Round of 16
Mahammad Mammadov (AZE)	35
Nuno Costa (POR)	17

==== Section 6 ====
Round of 128
Ramosoeu Nkuebe (LES)	19
Thandukukhanya Dlamini (SWZ)	5
Álvaro Gómez (COL)	DQ
~~Jules Isaac Sandy (VIN)~~
Mohamed Icham Touré (CIV)	7
Szabolcs Simon (ROU)	10

Round of 64
Nikola Vučković (SRB)	W
Ramosoeu Nkuebe (LES)
Álvaro Gómez (COL)	24
Oumar Sissoko (MLI)	12
Iordanis Konstantinidis (GER)	8
Saurav Sharma (IND)	12
Szabolcs Simon (ROU)	5
Bolat Izutdinov (RUS)	25

Round of 32
Nikola Vučković (SRB)	11
Álvaro Gómez (COL)	13
Saurav Sharma (IND)	1
Bolat Izutdinov (RUS)	19

Round of 16
Álvaro Gómez (COL)	9
Bolat Izutdinov (RUS)	11

==== Section 7 ====
Round of 128
Anthony Plenet (FGT)
Alejandro Chang (USA)	W
Abdulmalik Al-Arebi (LBA)	DQ
~~Maged Al-Obal (YEM)~~
Montassar Agimi (TUN)	27
Diego Acuña (BOL)	6

Round of 64
Joel González (ESP)	15
Alejandro Chang (USA)	19
Omar Hajjami (MAR)	5
Mirhashem Hosseini (IRI)	25
Dylan Chellamootoo (FRA)	14^{P}
Abdulmalik Al-Arebi (LBA)	4
Montassar Agimi (TUN)	19
Hakan Reçber (TUR)	18^{P}

Round of 32
Alejandro Chang (USA)	10
Mirhashem Hosseini (IRI)	21
Dylan Chellamootoo (FRA)	23
Hakan Reçber (TUR)	24

Round of 16
Mirhashem Hosseini (IRI)	20^{P}
Hakan Reçber (TUR)	6

==== Section 8 ====
Round of 128
Ho Chia-hsin (TPE)	27
Tom Burns (NZL)	5
Mohanad Sirag El-Nor (SUD)	10
Enkhboldyn Buyanshagai (MGL)	29^{P}
Jason Tan (SGP)	11
Chhun Soklong (CAM)	20

Round of 64
Gili Haimovitz (ISR)	16
Ho Chia-hsin (TPE)	36
Enkhboldyn Buyanshagai (MGL)	16
Siddhartha Bhat (CAN)	26
Rubén Nava (MEX)	15
Vlasios Petropoulos (GRE)	10
Chhun Soklong (CAM)	6
Lovre Brečić (CRO)	27

Round of 32
Ho Chia-hsin (TPE)	14
Siddhartha Bhat (CAN)	5
Rubén Nava (MEX)	8
Lovre Brečić (CRO)	14

Round of 16
Ho Chia-hsin (TPE)	22
Lovre Brečić (CRO)	13
