= Mahammad Mammadov =

Azerbaijani taekwondo practitioner

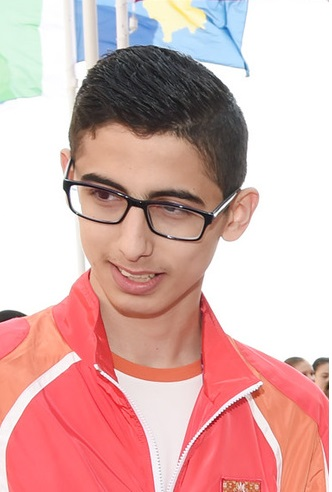
- Portrait of Mahammad Mammadov

Personal information
- Born: 27 June 1997 (age 29)
- Height: 195 cm (6 ft 5 in)

Sport
- Sport: Taekwondo
Medal record
Event	1st	2nd	3rd
Youth World Championships	1	–	–
World Championships	–	–	1
Youth European Championships	1	–	–
Universiade	–	–	1
Representing Azerbaijan
Youth World Championships
Gold medal – first place	2014 Taipei	-55 kg
World Championships
Bronze medal – third place	2017 Muju	-63 kg
Youth European Championships
Gold medal – first place	2013 Porto	-55 kg
Universiade
Bronze medal – third place	2017 Taipei	-63 kg
- Updated on 19 May 2019

Mahammad Mammadov (born 27 June 1997 in Azerbaijan) is an Azerbaijani Taekwondo athlete who won a bronze medal at the 2017 World Taekwondo Championships after being defeated in 1/02-finale against Mirhashem Hosseini.
