= 2019 World Taekwondo Championships – Men's bantamweight =

Men's bantamweight at the 2019 World Championships
- Venue: Manchester Arena
- Dates: 18–19 May 2019
- Competitors: 66 from 66 nations

Medalists
gold medal	Zhao Shuai	China
silver medal	Soroush Ahmadi	Iran
bronze medal	Iordanis Konstantinidis	Germany
bronze medal	Jaouad Achab	Belgium

The men's bantamweight is a competition featured at the 2019 World Taekwondo Championships, and was held at the Manchester Arena in Manchester, United Kingdom on 18 and 19 May. Bantamweights were limited to a maximum of 63 kilograms in body mass.

== Results ==
Legend

- DQ — Won by disqualification
- R — Won by referee stop contest
- W — Won by withdrawal

=== Finals ===
Quarterfinals		Semifinals		Final
Iordanis Konstantinidis (GER)	12
Bernardo Pié (DOM)	9	Iordanis Konstantinidis (GER)	8
Zhao Shuai (CHN)	8	Zhao Shuai (CHN)	10
Ferhat Can Kavurat (TUR)	6			Zhao Shuai (CHN)	27
Javad Aghayev (AZE)	14			Soroush Ahmadi (IRI)	7
Soroush Ahmadi (IRI)	22	Soroush Ahmadi (IRI)	6
Zaid Al-Halawani (JOR)	17	Jaouad Achab (BEL)	3
Jaouad Achab (BEL)	21

=== Top half ===
==== Section 1 ====
Round of 128
Luis Diego Morera (CRC)	34
Masud Aragorn Khan (BAN)	1

Round of 64
Lovre Brečić (CRO)	29
Luis Diego Morera (CRC)	9
Gadi Haimovitz (ISR)	1
Eldar Birimbay (KAZ)	24
Nareupong Thepsen (THA)	25
Ramosoeu Nkuebe (LES)	5
Thandukukhanya Dlamini (SWZ)	9
Iordanis Konstantinidis (GER)	17

Round of 32
Lovre Brečić (CRO)	19
Eldar Birimbay (KAZ)	23
Nareupong Thepsen (THA)	12
Iordanis Konstantinidis (GER)	17

Round of 16
Eldar Birimbay (KAZ)	13
Iordanis Konstantinidis (GER)	14

==== Section 2 ====
Round of 128

Round of 64
Bernardo Pié (DOM)	28
Keno Mendoza (PHI)	7
Tom Burns (NZL)	8
João Victor Diniz (BRA)	29
Mactar Diao (SEN)	2
Emir Kaljanac (BIH)	3
Korai Murakami (JPN)	43
Dylan Chellamootoo (FRA)	23

Round of 32
Bernardo Pié (DOM)	14
João Victor Diniz (BRA)	12
Emir Kaljanac (BIH)	10
Korai Murakami (JPN)	14

Round of 16
Bernardo Pié (DOM)	15
Korai Murakami (JPN)	3

==== Section 3 ====
Round of 128

Round of 64
Zhao Shuai (CHN)	25
Luca Ghiotti (SMR)	1
Jakub Posadzy (POL)	12
Niko Saarinen (FIN)	7
David Nazaryan (RUS)	19
Oleksandr Dziuba (UKR)	7
Conor Deery (IRL)	0
Simone Crescenzi (ITA)	9^{R}

Round of 32
Zhao Shuai (CHN)	28
Jakub Posadzy (POL)	6
David Nazaryan (RUS)	19
Simone Crescenzi (ITA)	15

Round of 16
Zhao Shuai (CHN)	8
David Nazaryan (RUS)	6

==== Section 4 ====
Round of 128

Round of 64
Ferhat Can Kavurat (TUR)	17^{W}
Jibreel Malik (GUY)	0
Kim Min-hyuk (KOR)	19
Siddhartha Bhat (CAN)	7
Nikolaos Kalaitsidis (GRE)	33
Hassan Shubbar (UAE)	18
Alexander Ortiz (PER)	12
Josh Calland (GBR)	17

Round of 32
Ferhat Can Kavurat (TUR)	32
Kim Min-hyuk (KOR)	25
Nikolaos Kalaitsidis (GRE)	13
Josh Calland (GBR)	33

Round of 16
Ferhat Can Kavurat (TUR)	32
Josh Calland (GBR)	16

=== Bottom half ===
==== Section 5 ====
Round of 128

Round of 64
Javad Aghayev (AZE)	24
Mohsin Al-Yusufi (OMA)	2
Ahmed Nassar (EGY)	28
Saurav Sharma (IND)	15
Damon Cavey (AUS)	19
Mesfer Al-Ajmi (KUW)	11
Eduardo Herrera (PUR)	12
Sebastián Navea (CHI)	13

Round of 32
Javad Aghayev (AZE)	24
Ahmed Nassar (EGY)	8
Damon Cavey (AUS)	19
Sebastián Navea (CHI)	21

Round of 16
Javad Aghayev (AZE)	12
Sebastián Navea (CHI)	4

==== Section 6 ====
Round of 128

Round of 64
Alejandro Chang (USA)	18
Abdou Taouil (AND)	5
Ramiro Ravachino (ARG)	21
Ibrahim Zarman (INA)	28
Hamad Al-Mabrouk (KSA)	33
Yahor Nikitsenka (BLR)	30
Christopher Sabbagh (LBN)	2
Soroush Ahmadi (IRI)	24

Round of 32
Alejandro Chang (USA)	22
Ibrahim Zarman (INA)	24
Hamad Al-Mabrouk (KSA)	2
Soroush Ahmadi (IRI)	23

Round of 16
Ibrahim Zarman (INA)	1
Soroush Ahmadi (IRI)	21

==== Section 7 ====
Round of 128

Round of 64
Marcos Caballero (ESP)	31
Joel Genuis (MLT)	0
Zaid Al-Halawani (JOR)	16
Carlos Navarro (MEX)	14
Ioannis Pilavakis (CYP)	3
Juirdo Cani (ALB)	28
Hesham Al-Hashimi (BRN)	14
Nuno Costa (POR)	20

Round of 32
Marcos Caballero (ESP)	21
Zaid Al-Halawani (JOR)	23
Juirdo Cani (ALB)	39
Nuno Costa (POR)	40

Round of 16
Zaid Al-Halawani (JOR)	21
Nuno Costa (POR)	1

==== Section 8 ====
Round of 128
Yuen Ho Sum (HKG)	DQ
~~Nicalas Fernandes (CPV)~~

Round of 64
Kaloyan Binev (BUL)	24
Noak Alami (SWE)	1
Abdelbaset Wasfi (MAR)	14
Ho Chia-hsin (TPE)	19
Ahmad Nor Iman Hakim (MAS)	17
Álvaro Gómez (COL)	15
Yuen Ho Sum (HKG)	5
Jaouad Achab (BEL)	22

Round of 32
Kaloyan Binev (BUL)	4
Ho Chia-hsin (TPE)	24
Ahmad Nor Iman Hakim (MAS)	11
Jaouad Achab (BEL)	12

Round of 16
Ho Chia-hsin (TPE)	8
Jaouad Achab (BEL)	9
