= Ibrahim Zarman =

Indonesian taekwondo practitioner

Personal information
- Born: 24 March 1997 (age 29)

Sport
- Country: Indonesia
- Sport: Taekwondo
Medal record
Men's taekwondo
Representing Indonesia
Southeast Asian Games
Gold medal – first place	2017 Kuala Lumpur	–63 kg
Asian Taekwondo Championships
Bronze medal – third place	2016 Pasay	–58 kg
Military World Games
Bronze medal – third place	2019 Wuhan	–63 kg

Ibrahim Zarman (born 24 March 1997) is an Indonesian taekwondo practitioner. He won the gold medal in the men's –63 kg event at the 2017 Southeast Asian Games held in Kuala Lumpur, Malaysia. In 2018, he competed in the men's 63 kg event at the Asian Games in Jakarta, Indonesia without winning a medal. He was eliminated from the competition in his second match by Cho Gang-min of South Korea.

In 2016, he won one of the bronze medals in the men's −58 kg event at the Asian Taekwondo Championships in Pasay, Philippines.

He competed in the men's bantamweight event at the 2019 World Taekwondo Championships in Manchester, United Kingdom where he was eliminated in his third match by Soroush Ahmadi of Iran. Ahmadi went on to win the silver medal. A few months later, he represented Indonesia at the 2019 Military World Games held in Wuhan, China and he won Indonesia's only medal at the event: one of the bronze medals in the –63 kg event.
