= China at the 2017 Summer Universiade =

- IOC code: CHN
- NOC: Chinese Olympic Committee
- Website: http://www.olympic.cn/

in Taipei, Taiwan
- Competitors: 108 in 9 sports
- Medals Ranked 9th: Gold 9 Silver 6 Bronze 2 Total 17

Summer Universiade appearances (overview)
- 1979; 1981; 1983; 1985; 1987; 1989; 1991; 1993; 1995; 1997; 1999; 2001; 2003; 2005; 2007; 2009; 2011; 2013; 2015; 2017; 2019; 2021; 2025; 2027

China participated at the 2017 Summer Universiade in Taipei, Taiwan with 108 competitors in 9 sports.

== Competitors ==
The following table lists China's delegation per sport and gender.

Sport	Men	Women	Total
Athletics	14	14	28
Fencing	9	7	16
Gymnastics	0	7	7
Roller Sports	1	0	1
Swimming	8	11	19
Table tennis	5	4	9
Taekwondo	3	10	13
Weightlifting	3	4	7
Wushu	5	3	8
Total	48	60	108

== Medal summary ==
Medals by sport
Sport	1st place, gold medalist(s)	2nd place, silver medalist(s)	3rd place, bronze medalist(s)	Total
Athletics	0	3	0	3
Roller Sports	1	0	0	1
Table tennis	1	0	1	2
Taekwondo	0	0	1	1
Weightlifting	0	1	0	1
Wushu	7	2	0	9
Total	9	6	2	17

== Athletics ==
=== Men ===
==== Track Events ====
Athlete	Event	Round 1		Round 2		Semifinal		Final	
Athlete	Event	Result	Rank	Result	Rank	Result	Rank	Result	Rank
Hengnan Jiang	100m	10.41	2Q	10.55	5q	10.44	6	Did not advance	
Ruixuan Zhang	200m	21.10	2Q	—		21.03	5	Did not advance	
Runyu Li	400m	47.14	3q	—		47.53	5	Did not advance	
Zeping Yang	400m	49.03	4	—		Did not advance			
Junlin Li	800m	1:51.77	4	—		Did not advance			
Guangcai Zhou	800m	1:56.63	7	—		Did not advance			
Tao Liu	5000m	15:50.70	14	—				Did not advance	
Hao Wang	5000m	15:29.05	11	—				Did not advance	
Tao Liu	Half Marathon	—						1:13:52	26
Huadong Tian	Half Marathon	—						1:11:26	18
Hao Wang	Half Marathon	—						1:20:17	36
Jijiang Han	20km Walk	—						1:40:56	20
Dexiang Yan	20km Walk	—						1:46:30	21
Fujian Zhao	20km Walk	—						1:40:14	18
Junlin Li; Runyu Lin; Zeping Yang; Guangci Zhou	4x400m Relay	3:11.64	3	—				Did not advance	
China	Team 20k Walk	—						5:07.40	5
China	Team Half Marathon	—						3:45:35	7

==== Field Events ====
Athlete	Event	Qualification		Final	
Athlete	Event	Distance	Position	Distance	Position
Yan Liu	Triple Jump	15.46	9	Did not advance	
Yize Sun	Long Jump	7.47	10	Did not advance	

=== Women ===
==== Track Events ====
Athlete	Event	Round 1		Round 2		Semifinal		Final	
Athlete	Event	Result	Rank	Result	Rank	Result	Rank	Result	Rank
Yuke Wang	100m Hurdles	14.35	5	—		Did not advance			
Hua Shaoqing	Half Marathon	—						1:18:33	9
Liu Qinghong	Half Marathon	—						1:27:27	21
Yiming Ma	Half Marathon	—						DNF	—
Yuyu Xia	Half Marathon	—						DNF	—
Yin Anna	Half Marathon	—						1:24:24	17
Lin Zhu	Half Marathon	—						1:37:57	24
Xin Zhang	20km Walk	—						1:41:18	2nd place, silver medalist(s)
Yan Zhang	20km Walk	—						1:52.06	13
Huimin Zhao	20km Walk	—						1:45:38	8
China	Team 20km Walk	—						5:19:12	2nd place, silver medalist(s)
China	Team Half Marathon	—						4:10.24	4

==== Field Events ====
Athlete	Event	Qualification		Final	
Athlete	Event	Distance	Position	Distance	Position
Luna Fu	Long Jump	5.93	6q	5.97	11
Luna Fu	Triple Jump	13.21	3q	13.59	2nd place, silver medalist(s)
Lingdan Su	Javelin	57.38	4q	57.20	8
Lan Wang	Discus	49.39	7	Did not advance	

==== Combined Events ====
Heptathlon

Athlete	Event	100H	HJ	SP	200 m	LJ	JT	800 m	Final	Rank
Yuting Pang	Result	14.71	1.71	11.70	26.93	5.45	42.40	2:30.19	5195	8
Yuting Pang	Points	880	867	641	718	686	713	690	5195	8

== Fencing ==
Athlete	Event	Round of 128	Round of 64	Round of 32	Round of 16	Quarterfinal	Semifinal	Final / BM	
Athlete	Event	Opposition Score	Opposition Score	Opposition Score	Opposition Score	Opposition Score	Opposition Score	Opposition Score	Rank
Zihao Shen	Men's Epee Individual	Bye	Hong Kai Ting (TPE); L 3-4	Did not advance					41
Jingjing Xu	Men's Epee Individual	Tsung Lin Chen (TPE); L 5-15	Did not advance						70
Deze Ye	Men's Epee Individual	Federico Vismara (ITA); L 10-15	Did not advance						68
Junhao Wu	Men's Foil Individual	—	Erwann Auclin (FRA); W 15-13	Francesco Trani (ITA); L 2-15	Did not advance				29
Deze Ye; Jingjing Xu; Zihao Shen; Zicheng Wang	Men's Epee Team	—		Chinese Taipei (TPE); W 45-43	France (FRA); L 28-45	Did not advance			16
Zhousheng Wu; Junho Wu; Yu Zhang	Men's Foil Team	—			France (FRA); L 25-45	Did not advance			11
Zicheng Wang; Yifeng Lu; Zhezhao Shi	Men's Sabre Team	—			Italy (ITA); L 19-45	Did not advance			14
Minmin Lu	Women's Epee Individual	Bye	Anfisa Pochkalova (UKR); L 13-15	Did not advance					39
Yufen Wang	Women's Epee Individual	Bye	Eniko Siklosi (HUN); W 15-13	Marie-Florence Candassamy (FRA); L 8-15	Did not advance				22
Mengxu Xu	Women's Foil Individual	—	Rozene Castanie (FRA); W 15-4	Martyna Jelinska (POL); W 15-8	Chloe Jubenot (FRA); L 13-15	Did not advance			15
Yufen Wang; Jiali Geng; Minmin Lu	Women's Epee Team	—		India (IND); W 45-29	Republic of Korea (KOR); L 28-45	Did not advance			15
Xin Li; Mengxu Xu; Xinxin Kang	Women's Foil Team	—			Japan (JPN); W 45-38	Poland (POL); L 24-45	Did not advance		8

== Gymnastics ==
=== Rhythmic ===
Individual

Athlete	Event	Apparatus					
Athlete	Event	Hoop	Ball	Clubs	Ribbon	Total	Rank
Weiling Wu	Individual All-Around	10.550	9.850	10.650	6.500	37.550	35
Jing Zhang	Individual All-Around	12.850	11.100	9.950	10.250	44.150	28

Group

Athlete	Event	Apparatus			
Athlete	Event	5 Hoops	3 Balls & 2 Hoops	Total	Rank
Pangbo Fu; Yaoyao Su; Siyi Wen; Ruomo Pan; Siqi Liu	Group All-Around	15.750	13.700	29.450	6

== Roller Sports ==
Athlete	Event	Preliminary		Semifinal		Final	
Athlete	Event	Time	Rank	Time	Rank	Time/Points	Rank
Yushuo Pan	Men's Speed Slalom	4.461	4q	2-1	1Q	2-1	1st place, gold medalist(s)

== Swimming ==
=== Men ===
Athlete	Event	Heat		Semifinal		Final	
Athlete	Event	Time	Rank	Time	Rank	Time	Rank
Hongrui Chen	100m Breaststroke	1:06.05	2	Did not advance			
Hongrui Chen	50m Breaststroke	29.96	1	Did not advance			
Yuli Jin	50m Butterfly	25.20	7	Did not advance			
Yuli Jin	100m Butterfly	55.27	5	Did not advance			
Xiaochen Li	200m Freestyle	1:57.50	6	Did not advance			
Xiaochen Li	200m Individual Medley	2:15.45	8	Did not advance			
Zongwen Li	100m Freestyle	52.25	3	Did not advance			
Zongwen Li	50m Freestyle	24.09	6	Did not advance			
Rixin Ma	400m Freestyle	4:15.33	3	Did not advance			
Rixin Ma	800m Freestyle	8:41.41	2	Did not advance			
Xingxu Mu	200m Individual Medley	2:16.09	2	Did not advance			
Xingxu Mu	200m Butterfly	2:08.66	4	Did not advance			
Xianhe Yang	100m Freestyle	52.57	3	Did not advance			
Xianhe Yang	50m Freestyle	23.76	1	Did not advance			
Shimeng Zhang	50m Butterfly	25.13	5	Did not advance			
Shimeng Zhang	100m Butterfly	55.85	5	Did not advance			
Zongwen Li; Xianhe Yang; Shimeng Zhang; Xiaochen Li	4x100m Freestyle Relay	3:31.10	1	—		Did not advance	
Zongwen Li; Yuli Jin; Hongrui Chen; Xianhe Yang; Xiaochen Li; Xingxu Mu	4x100m Medley Relay	3:57.63	4	—		Did not advance	

=== Women ===
Athlete	Event	Heat		Semifinal		Final	
Athlete	Event	Time	Rank	Time	Rank	Time	Rank
Xuechen Cai	100m Butterfly	1:04.03	4	Did not advance			
Xuechen Cai	200m Butterfly	2:21.37	1	Did not advance			
Siwen Gu	100m Butterfly	1:01.28	1	Did not advance			
Siwen Gu	200m Butterfly	2:18.03	7	Did not advance			
Xinlan Lin	50m Butterfly	28.03	1	Did not advance			
Xinlan Lin	200m Individual Medley	2:20.14	1	Did not advance			
Yutong Song	50m Butterfly	29.11	4	Did not advance			
Yutong Song	50m Backstroke	30.66	2	Did not advance			
Tong Wu	100m Freestyle	59.21	1	Did not advance			
Tong Wu	50m Freestyle	26.61	8	Did not advance			
Jue Xu	100m Freestyle	59.71	2	Did not advance			
Lili Xu	200m Backstroke	2:21.28	6	Did not advance			
Lili Xu	200m Individual Medley	2:24.18	5	Did not advance			
Rui Xu	200m Freestyle	2:09.37	3	Did not advance			
Rui Xu	400m Freestyle	4:41.35	6	Did not advance			
Ying Zhao	100m Breaststroke	1:14.82	3	Did not advance			
Ying Zhao	50m Breaststroke	33.98	3	Did not advance			
Jingwen Zhu	200m Freestyle	2:06.30	1	Did not advance			
Jingwen Zhu	400m Freestyle	4:26.44	4	Did not advance			
Xiaotong Zhu	50m Freestyle	27.53	6	Did not advance			
Tong Wu; Xiaotong Zhu; Lili Xu; Jue Xu	4x100 Freestyle Relay	3:56.79	1	—		Did not advance	
Rui Xu; Xinlan Lin; Siwen Gu; Lili Xu; Tong Wu	4x100 Medley Relay	4:24.33	1	—		Did not advance	

== Table Tennis ==
Athlete	Event	Group stage			Round of 128	Round of 64	Round of 32	Round of 16	Quarterfinals	Semifinals	Final / BM	
Athlete	Event	Opposition Result	Opposition Result	Opposition Result	Opposition Result	Opposition Result	Opposition Result	Opposition Result	Opposition Result	Opposition Result	Opposition Result	Rank
Xin Chen; Lingxuan Kong; Jiaxin Lai; Yu Ziyang; Linfeng Zhu	Men's Team	Argentina (ARG); W 3-0	Russia (RUS); W 3-2	New Zealand (NZL); W 3-0	—			United States of America (USA); W 3-0	Germany (GER); W 3-0	Republic of Korea (KOR); W 3-1	Japan (JPN); W 3-0	1st place, gold medalist(s)
Chen Sun; Shu Wang; Shichang Zheng; Xintong Zhou	Women's Team	Sweden (SWE); W 3-0	Luxembourg (LUX); W 3-0	Lebanon (LBN); W 3-0	—			Kazakhstan (KAZ); W 3-0	Russia (RUS); W 3-0	Japan (JPN); L 1-3	Did not advance	3rd place, bronze medalist(s)

== Taekwondo ==
Athlete	Event	Round of 64	Round of 32	Round of 16	Quarterfinals	Semifinals	Final / BM	
Athlete	Event	Opposition Result	Opposition Result	Opposition Result	Opposition Result	Opposition Result	Opposition Result	Rank
Lei Bao	Women's -73 kg	—	Marie Paule And Ble (FRA); W 12-10	Aleksandra Kata Krzemieniecka (POL); L 11-24	Did not advance			
Chengzhi Chen	Men's -58 kg	Aituar Shaikenov (KAZ); L WDR-0	Did not advance					
Chen Cheng	Women's -67 kg	—	Anna Maria Khawand (LBN); W 27-WDR	Nigora Tursunkulova (UZB); W 0-WDR	Melika Mirhosseini (IRI); L 0-2	Did not advance		
Haiqiong Huang	Women's -46 kg	—	Alondra Jasminn Venegas (USA); L DSQ-0	Did not advance				
Feifei Qu	Women's -53 kg	—	Ann Janeth Garcia (PHI); W 11-1	Madeline Jo Ann Folgmann (GER); L 0-8	Did not advance			
Xiaojing Wei	Women's -57 kg	—	Julia Anna Ronken (GER); W 5-3	Hatice Kuba Ilgun (TUR); L 5-14	Did not advance			
Yanil Yang	Women's +73 kg	—	Paloma Ferreira de Lima (BRA); L 1-10	Did not advance				
Xiao Zhang	Women's -49 kg	—	Stefania Tavares Damasio (BRA); W 5-3	Ashmita Khadka (NEP); W 29-5	Panipak Wongpattanakit (THA); L 5-8	Did not advance		
Yuhan Ji	Women's Individual Freestyle Poomsa	—				7.917	7.280	6
Qiuheng Wang	Men's Individual Freestyle Poomsa	—				7.850	7.053	7
Xingchen Chen; Huaying Wu	Mixed Pair Poomsae	—				7.750	6.920	6
Huaying Wu; Yuqi Tang; Yuhan Ji	Women's Team Poomsae	—				7.950	7.533	3rd place, bronze medalist(s)

== Weightlifting ==
Athlete	Event	Snatch		Clean & jerk		Total	Rank
Athlete	Event	Result	Rank	Result	Rank	Total	Rank
Peng Cheng	Men's 56 kg	90	3	105	4	195	15
Xiuzhu Liao	Women's 63 kg	104	2	118	6	222	4
Feng Liu	Women's 53 kg	90	1	117	2	207	2nd place, silver medalist(s)
Cheng Luo	Men's 77 kg	133	1	155	1	288	7
Mengling Sun	Women's 75 kg	100	4	117	5	217	5
Pei Xiong	Women's 58 kg	DNF					—
Zhenhua Zhou	Men's 69 kg	144	1	165	2	309	6

== Wushu ==
=== Sanda ===
Athlete	Event	Preliminary	Quarterfinals	Semifinals	Final	
Athlete	Event	Opposition Result	Opposition Result	Opposition Result	Opposition Result	Rank
Xianting Jiang	Women's Sanda - 60kg	—	Bye	Ilona Olkhovyk (UKR); W 2-0	Yi-Ju Lin (TPE); W 2-0	1st place, gold medalist(s)
Shengnan Li	Men's Sanda - 80kg	Van Sy Ngo (VIE); W 2-0	Kemal Sahatov (TKM); W 2-0	Bagdat Kenzhetayev (KAZ); W 2-0	Hamid Reza Ladvar (IRI); L 0-2	2nd place, silver medalist(s)
Peng Yuan	Men's Sanda - 52kg	—	Bye	Seongji Byeon (KOR); W 2-0	Jomar Balangui (PHI); W 2-0	1st place, gold medalist(s)
Fuxiang Zhao	Men's Sanda - 60kg	Hong Tu Hoang (VIE); W 2-0	Hayk Gasparyan (ARM); W 2-0	Sunghyun Jo (KOR); W 2-0	Erfan Ahangarian (IRI); L 0-2	2nd place, silver medalist(s)

=== Taolu ===
Athlete	Event	Pool Round	
Athlete	Event	Score	Rank
Fanhui Kong	Men's Taolu – Taijiquan & Taijijian	9.67	1st place, gold medalist(s)
Liuyan Lai	Women's Taolu – Nanquan & Nandao	9.46	1st place, gold medalist(s)
Mengnan Li	Men's Taolu – Changquan	9.55	1st place, gold medalist(s)
Mengnan Li	Men's Taolu – Daoshu & Gunshu	9.65	1st place, gold medalist(s)
Mengyao Wu	Women's Taolu – Taijiquan & Taijijian	9.62	1st place, gold medalist(s)

== See also ==
- China at the Universiade
