= Ela Aydin Konstantinidis =

German taekwondo practitioner

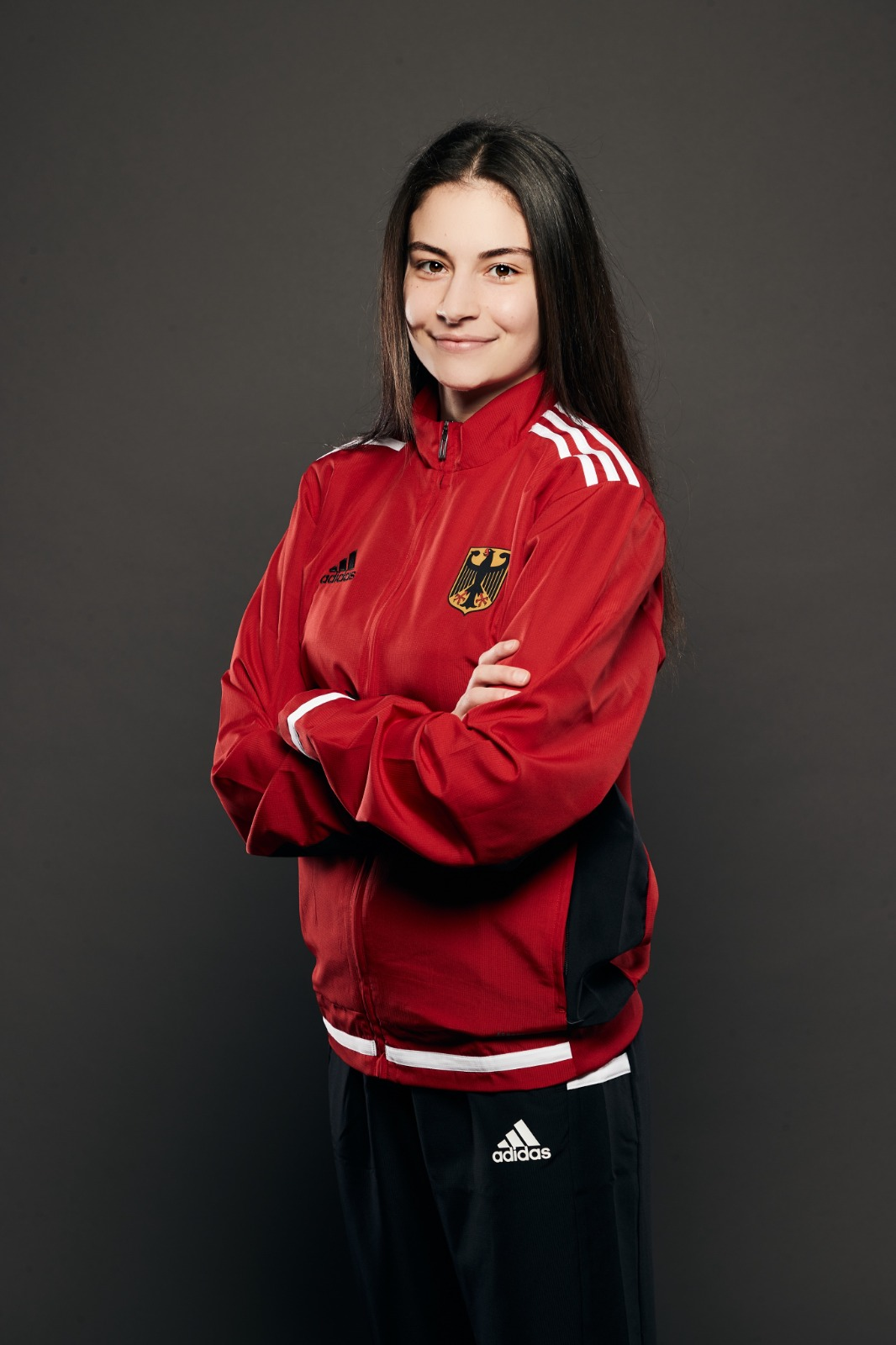

Personal information
- Nationality: German
- Born: 12 January 1999 (age 27) Munich, Germany
- Height: 1.69 m (5 ft 7 in)

Sport
- Country: Germany
- Sport: Taekwondo
- Events: –57 kg, –49 kg
- Club: TSV Dachau 1865 e.V.
- Turned pro: 2018
- Coached by: Demirhan Aydin; Iordanis Konstantinidis

Achievements and titles
- World finals: 3rd place, bronze medalist(s)
- Regional finals: 2nd place, silver medalist(s)
- National finals: 1st place, gold medalist(s)
- Highest world ranking: –57 kg: 29 (2026), –49 kg: 5 (2022)
Medal record
Women's taekwondo
Representing Germany
Grand Prix
Bronze medal – third place	2022 Paris	49 kg
European Championships
Silver medal – second place	2017 Sofia	49 kg
Silver medal – second place	2019 Bari	49 kg
Bronze medal – third place	2021 Sofia	49 kg
Bronze medal – third place	2022 Manchester	53 kg
Military World Games
Bronze medal – third place	2019 Wuhan	49 kg
European U21 Championships
Silver medal – second place	2017 Sofia	53 kg
European Cadet Championships
Bronze medal – third place	2013 Bukarest	41 kg
- Updated on 03 March 2026

Ela Aydin Konstantinidis (born 12 January 1999, née Aydin) is a German taekwondo athlete. Her greatest achievements are a bronze medal at the 2022 Grand Prix in Paris and all together six medals at European Championships.

== Career ==
=== Junior ===
Ela Aydin began practicing taekwondo at the age of five and participated in her first competition at age six. When she was 14, she was selected to represent the German national team at her first U15 European Championship in Bucharest in 2013, where she won a bronze medal.

In the years following, Aydin took part in several competitions such as the taekwondo Youth World Championships and several European Championships. In 2016, she tore a cruciate ligament in her knee and due to undergoing surgery had to take a break from competing.

=== Senior ===
In 2017, Aydin won a silver medal at the U21 European Championships in Sofia. In 2018, she participated in the European Championships in Kazan but lost in the prelims against the eventual European Champion Kristina Tomić from Croatia. She also competed in the Grand Prix series of 2018.

The following year, Aydin won a bronze medal at the 2019 Military World Games in Wuhan and a silver medal at the Extra European Championships in Bari. In both competitions, she participated in the Olympic weight class of 49 kilograms. She also competed in the 2019 World Championships in Manchester, where she finished in ninth place, as well as the 2019 European U21 Championships and two Grand Prix competitions.

In early 2021, Aydin won a bronze medal at the European Championships in Sofia. A few months later, she narrowly missed out on qualifying for the 2020 Olympics Games, losing to Israeli fighter Avishag Semberg in the semifinals of the tournament. Qualifying for the final would have meant being allowed to participate in the Olympic Games in Tokyo.

In September 2022, Ela Aydin won a bronze medal at the Paris Grand Prix - she is the first woman of the German national team to have won a medal at a Grand Prix competition. She also won a bronze medal at the 2022 European Championships in Manchester. She took part in the 2023 World Championships in Baku. She won her opening match but lost to Dunya Abutaleb from Saudi Arabia in her second match (round of 16).

In March 2024, Aydin participated in the European qualification tournament for the Summer Olympics in Paris, where she won the round of 16 against Zemfira Hasanzade (Azerbaijan) 2:0, but lost to Ilenia Matonti from Italy in the quarter-finals. She therefore did not qualify a quota place for the 49 kg weight category at the Olympic Games, as this would have required her to reach the final. In April 2024, Aydin underwent another cruciate ligament and meniscus surgery.

== Personal life ==
In 2017, Aydin graduated from school with a General Certificate of Secondary Education. In the same year, she joined the sports promotion group of the Bundeswehr (German: Sportfördergruppe der Bundeswehr) and completed her basic training by the start of 2018. She has been a Soldier-Athlete (German: Sportsoldat) ever since.

== Competitive history ==
Year	Event	Location	G-Rank	Place
2026	Bulgaria Open	(Bulgaria) Sofia	G-2	3rd
2026	Austrian Open	(Austria) Innsbruck	G-1	2nd
2026	German Championships	(Germany) Nuremberg	-	3rd
2025	Bosnia and Herzegovina Open	(Bosnia and Herzegovina) Sarajevo	G-1	3rd
2025	Croatia Open	(Croatia) Zagreb	G-1	1st
2025	Dracula Open	(Romania) Bucharest	G-1	1st
2025	Riga Open	(Latvia) Riga	G-1	2nd
2025	Swiss Open	(Switzerland) St. Gallen	G-1	3rd
2024	Slovenia Open	(Slovenia) Ljubljana	G-1	3rd
2024	German Championships	(Germany) Ochsenhausen	-	1st
2023	Croatia Open	(Croatia) Zagreb	G-1	3rd
2023	Polish Open	(Poland) Warsaw	G-1	3rd
2023	Tallinn Open	(Estonia) Tallinn	G-1	1st
2023	European Clubs Championships	(Bulgaria) Sofia	G-1	1st
2023	US Open	(United States) Las Vegas	G-2	3rd
2023	German Championships	(Germany) Nuremberg	-	2nd
2022	Dutch Open	(Netherlands) Eindhoven	G-1	1st
2022	Grand Prix	(France) Paris	G-6	3rd
2022	European Clubs Championships	(Estonia) Tallinn	G-2	2nd
2022	European Championships	(United Kingdom) Manchester	G-4	3rd
2022	Spanish Open	(Spain) La Nucia	G-2	3rd
2022	Turkish Open	(Turkey) Antalya	G-2	1st
2022	Fujairah Open	(United Arab Emirates) Fujairah	G-2	1st
2022	German Championships	(Germany) Weißenburg	-	1st
2021	French Open	(France) Paris	G-1	3rd
2021	Montenegro Open	(Montenegro) Podgorica	G-1	3rd
2021	Albania Open	(Albania) Tirana	G-1	3rd
2021	WT Presidents Cup - Europe	(Turkey) Istanbul	G-1	2nd
2021	Tallinn Open	(Estonia) Tallinn	G-1	1st
2021	Beirut Open	(Lebanon) Beirut	G-2	2nd
2021	Spanish Open	(Spain) Alicante	G-1	3rd
2021	European Championships	(Bulgaria) Sofia	G-4	3rd
2021	German Championships	(Germany) Dortmund	-	1st
2020	Sofia Open	(Bulgaria) Sofia	G-1	3rd
2020	German Open	(Germany) Hamburg	G-2	2nd
2020	Helsingborg Open	(Sweden) Helsingborg	G-1	3rd
2020	German Championships	(Germany) Lünen	-	1st
2019	Extra European Championships	(Italy) Bari	G-4	2nd
2019	Military World Games	(China) Wuhan	G-2	3rd
2019	Austrian Open	(Austria) Innsbruck	G-1	3rd
2019	WT Presidents Cup - Africa	(Morocco) Agadir	G-1	3rd
2019	Dutch Open	(Netherlands) Nijmegen	G-1	3rd
2019	US Open	(United States) Las Vegas	G-1	3rd
2019	Slovenia Open	(Slovenia) Maribor	G-1	1st
2019	German Championships	(Germany) Nuremberg	-	2nd
2018	Luxembourg Open	Luxembourg	G-1	3rd
2018	Multi European Games	(Bulgaria) Plodiv	G-1	1st
2018	Austrian Open	(Austria) Innsbruck	G-1	1st
2017	Croatia Open	(Croatia) Zagreb	G-4	2nd
2017	Serbia Open	(Serbia) Belgrade	G-1	3rd
2017	Riga Open	(Latvia) Riga	G-1	2nd
2017	Polish Open	(Poland) Warsaw	G-1	1st
2017	Austrian Open	(Austria) Innsbruck	G-1	2nd
2017	European Championships (U21)	(Bulgaria) Sofia	G-4	2nd
2014	German Championships	(Germany) Gummersbach	-	2nd
2013	European Championships (cadets)	(Romania) Bucharest	G-4	3rd
