= Wushu at the 2018 Asian Games – Men's sanda 60 kg =

Men's sanda 60 kg at the 2018 Asian Games
- Venue: Jakarta International Expo
- Dates: 19–23 August 2018
- Competitors: 19 from 19 nations

Medalists
gold medal	Erfan Ahangarian	Iran
silver medal	Wang Xuetao	China
bronze medal	Nghiêm Văn Ý	Vietnam
bronze medal	Surya Bhanu Pratap Singh	India

The men's sanda 60 kilograms competition at the 2018 Asian Games in Jakarta, Indonesia was held from 19 August to 23 August at the JIExpo Kemayoran Hall B3.

== Schedule ==
All times are Western Indonesia Time (UTC+07:00)

Date	Time	Event
Sunday, 19 August 2018	19:00	Round of 32
Monday, 20 August 2018	19:00	Round of 16
Tuesday, 21 August 2018	19:00	Quarterfinals
Wednesday, 22 August 2018	19:00	Semifinals
Thursday, 23 August 2018	10:00	Final

== Results ==
Legend

- PD — Won by point difference
- WO — Won by walkover

=== Final ===
Final
Wang Xuetao (CHN)	1
Erfan Ahangarian (IRI)	2

=== Top half ===
Round of 32
Chit Ko Ko (MYA)	1
Almas Duiseyev (KAZ)	2

Round of 16
Rustam Ibragimov (KGZ)	2
Almas Duiseyev (KAZ)	0
Wang Xuetao (CHN)	2
Naweed Sudiqi (AFG)	0
Islombek Khaydarov (UZB)	0
Nghiêm Văn Ý (VIE)	2
Pethum Balawardhana (SRI)	2
Noukhith Latsaphao (LAO)	0

Quarterfinals
Rustam Ibragimov (KGZ)
Wang Xuetao (CHN)	PD
Nghiêm Văn Ý (VIE)	2
Pethum Balawardhana (SRI)	0

Semifinals
Wang Xuetao (CHN)	WO
Nghiêm Văn Ý (VIE)

=== Bottom half ===
Round of 32
Wachara Sunthorn (THA)
Erfan Ahangarian (IRI)	PD
Mangal Prasad Tharu (NEP)
Abdul Haris Sofyan (INA)	PD

Round of 16
Helal Al-Hajj (YEM)	0
Erfan Ahangarian (IRI)	2
Abdul Khaliq (PAK)	0
Jo Sung-hyun (KOR)	2
Mio Iat San (MAC)	0
Jean Claude Saclag (PHI)	2
Abdul Haris Sofyan (INA)	1
Surya Bhanu Pratap Singh (IND)	2

Quarterfinals
Erfan Ahangarian (IRI)	2
Jo Sung-hyun (KOR)	1
Jean Claude Saclag (PHI)	0
Surya Bhanu Pratap Singh (IND)	2

Semifinals
Erfan Ahangarian (IRI)	2
Surya Bhanu Pratap Singh (IND)	0
