= Wushu at the 2017 Summer Universiade =

Wushu at the XXIX Summer Universiade
- Venues: Hsinchu County Gymnasium
- Dates: 26–29 August 2017

Wushu was contested at the 2017 Summer Universiade from August 26 to 29 at the Hsinchu County Gymnasium in Zhubei, Hsinchu County, Taiwan.

== Medal summary ==
=== Medal table ===
Rank	Nation	Gold	Silver	Bronze	Total
1	China	7	2	0	9
2	Iran	3	1	2	6
3	Macau	2	0	0	2
4	Chinese Taipei*	1	3	2	6
5	South Korea	1	1	2	4
6	Russia	0	3	1	4
7	Malaysia	0	2	1	3
8	Kazakhstan	0	1	1	2
9	Philippines	0	1	0	1
10	Indonesia	0	0	2	2
10	Japan	0	0	2	2
10	United States	0	0	2	2
13	Armenia	0	0	1	1
13	Hong Kong	0	0	1	1
13	Turkey	0	0	1	1
13	Ukraine	0	0	1	1
13	Vietnam	0	0	1	1
Totals (17 entries)		14	14	20	48

=== Men's taolu ===
Event	Gold	Silver	Bronze
Changquan	Li Mengnan; China	Pavel Muratov; Russia	Tsai Tse-min; Chinese Taipei
Nanquan / Nangun	Hsu Kai-kuei; Chinese Taipei	Lee Calvin Wai Leon; Malaysia	Yoshitaka Asayama; Japan
Taijiquan / Taijijian	Kong Fanhui; China	Chen Yu-wei; Chinese Taipei	Loh Choon How; Malaysia
Daoshu / Gunshu	Li Mengnan; China	Ilias Khusnutdinov; Russia	Amir Mohammadrezaei; Iran

=== Men's sanda ===
Event	Gold	Silver	Bronze
52 kg	Yuan Peng; China	Jomar Balangui; Philippines	Byeon Seong-ji; South Korea
52 kg	Yuan Peng; China	Jomar Balangui; Philippines	Isiah Ray Enríquez; United States
60 kg	Erfan Ahangarian; Iran	Zhao Fuxiang; China	Ali Magomedov; Russia
60 kg	Erfan Ahangarian; Iran	Zhao Fuxiang; China	Jo Sung-hyun; South Korea
70 kg	Jafar Shirzadeh; Iran	Ruslan Libirov; Kazakhstan	Karapet Tevosyan; Armenia
70 kg	Jafar Shirzadeh; Iran	Ruslan Libirov; Kazakhstan	Puja Riyaya; Indonesia
80 kg	Hamid Reza Ladvar; Iran	Li Shengnan; China	Yavuz Selim Kazanci; Turkey
80 kg	Hamid Reza Ladvar; Iran	Li Shengnan; China	Bagdat Kenzhetayev; Kazakhstan

=== Women's taolu ===
Event	Gold	Silver	Bronze
Changquan	Li Yi; Macau	Sandra Konstantinova; Russia	Ayaka Honda; Japan
Nanquan / Nandao	Lai Liuyan; China	Tan Cheong Min; Malaysia	Fatemeh Heidari; Iran
Taijiquan / Taijijian	Wu Mengyao; China	Chen Yi-ying; Chinese Taipei	Mok Uen Ying Juanita; Hong Kong
Jianshu / Qiangshu	Li Yi; Macau	Seo Hee-ju; South Korea	Emily Xinyu Fan; United States

=== Women's sanda ===
Event	Gold	Silver	Bronze
52 kg	Kim Hye-bin; South Korea	Arezou Salimighalehtaki; Iran	Chen Wei-ting; Chinese Taipei
52 kg	Kim Hye-bin; South Korea	Arezou Salimighalehtaki; Iran	Junita Malau; Indonesia
60 kg	Jiang Xianting; China	Lin Yi-ju; Chinese Taipei	Ilona Olkhovyk; Ukraine
60 kg	Jiang Xianting; China	Lin Yi-ju; Chinese Taipei	Trieu Thi Thuy; Vietnam
