= Bulgaria at the 2017 Summer Universiade =

- IOC code: BUL
- NOC: Bulgarian Olympic Committee
- Website: www.bgolympic.org (in Bulgarian)

in Taipei, Taiwan 19 – 30 August 2017
- Competitors: 10 in 5 sports
- Medals: Gold 0 Silver 0 Bronze 0 Total 0

Summer Universiade appearances
- 1959; 1961; 1963; 1965; 1967; 1970; 1973; 1975; 1977; 1979; 1981; 1983; 1985; 1987; 1989; 1991; 1993; 1995; 1997; 1999; 2001; 2003; 2005; 2007; 2009; 2011; 2013; 2015; 2017; 2019; 2021

Bulgaria participated at the 2017 Summer Universiade, in Taipei, Taiwan with 10 competitors in 5 sports.

== Competitors ==
The following table lists Bulgaria's delegation per sport and gender.

Sport	Men	Women	Total
Athletics	1	3	4
Fencing	2	0	2
Judo	1	0	1
Swimming	0	1	1
Taekwondo	1	1	2
Total	5	5	10

== Athletics ==
=== Track Events ===
Athlete	Event	Round 1		Round 2		Semifinal		Final	
Athlete	Event	Result	Rank	Result	Rank	Result	Rank	Result	Rank
Dilyana Venelin Minkina	Women's 1500m	4:39.36	11	—				Did Not Advance	
Borislav Plamen Tonev	Men's 200m	22.35	=5	—		Did Not Advance			

=== Field Events ===
Athlete	Event	Qualification		Final	
Athlete	Event	Distance	Position	Distance	Position
Milena Krasimir Mitkova	Women's Long Jump	6.21	1q	6.26	4
Renata Tsankova Petkova	Women's Discus	47.59	8	did not advance	

== Fencing ==
Athlete	Event	Round of 128	Round of 64	Round of 32	Round of 16	Quarterfinal	Semifinal	Final / BM	
Athlete	Event	Opposition Score	Opposition Score	Opposition Score	Opposition Score	Opposition Score	Opposition Score	Opposition Score	Rank
Lyuboslav Burnev	Men's Sabre Individual	—	Yuto Watanabe (JPN); W 15-14	Lorenzo Romano (ITA); L 7-15	did not advance				28
Pancho Paskov	Men's Sabre Individual	—	DNS	did not advance					—

== Judo ==
Athlete	Event	Round of 64	Round of 32	Round of 16	Quarterfinals	Repechage 32	Repechage 16	Repechage 8	Final Repechage	Semifinals	Final / BM	
Athlete	Event	Opposition Result	Opposition Result	Opposition Result	Opposition Result	Opposition Result	Opposition Result	Opposition Result	Opposition Result	Opposition Result	Opposition Result	Rank
Borislav Ivanov Yanakov	Men's -60 kg	Bye	Benjamin Jun We Ng (SGP); L DNS–00	did not advance								—

== Swimming ==
Athlete	Event	Heat		Semifinal		Final	
Athlete	Event	Time	Rank	Time	Rank	Time	Rank
Gabriela Georgi Georgieva	Women's 200m Backstroke	2:18.67	3	did not advance			
Gabriela Georgi Georgieva	Women's 100m Backstroke	1:04.65	6	did not advance			
Gabriela Georgi Georgieva	Women's 50m Backstroke	30.21	2	did not advance			
Gabriela Georgi Georgieva	Women's 50m Breaststroke	35.51	6	did not advance			

== Taekwondo ==
Athlete	Event	Round of 64	Round of 32	Round of 16	Quarterfinals	Semifinals	Final / BM	
Athlete	Event	Opposition Result	Opposition Result	Opposition Result	Opposition Result	Opposition Result	Opposition Result	Rank
Nikol Vasileva Chorbanova	Women's -53 kg	—	Madeline Jo Ann Folgmann (GER); L 3-9	Did Not Advance				17
Vladimir Aleksa Dalakliev	Men's -68 kg	Bye	Seyedhossein Ehsanipetroudi (IRI); L 17-19	Did Not Advance				17
