= Surya Bhanu Pratap Singh =

Indian martial artist

Personal information
- Nationality: Indian
- Born: 12 November 1995 (age 30) Jammu, Jammu and Kashmir, India

Sport
- Country: India
- Sport: Wushu
Medal record
Wushu
Representing India
World Wushu Championships
Bronze medal – third place	2017 Kazan	60 kg Sanda
Bronze medal – third place	2015 Jakarta	60 kg Sanda
Asian Games
Bronze medal – third place	2018 Jakarta-Palembang	60 kg Sanda
South Asian Games
Gold medal – first place	2016 Guwahati-Shillong	60 kg Sanda

Surya Bhanu Pratap Singh (born 12 November 1995) is an Indian wushu practitioner from Jammu, Jammu and Kashmir. He won bronze at the 2015 World Wushu Championships in Jakarta and bronze at the 2017 World Wushu Championships in Kazan in the men's Sanda 60 kg category.

He also won the gold medal at 2016 South Asian Games in the same category.

He represented India in Asian Games 2018, Jakarta and bagged bronze medal. As of 2016, Singh works with the Jammu and Kashmir Police.
