= Taekwondo at the 2018 Asian Games – Men's 63 kg =

Taekwondo competition

Men's 63 kg at the 2018 Asian Games
- Venue: Jakarta Convention Center
- Date: 22 August 2018
- Competitors: 26 from 26 nations

Medalists
gold medal	Mirhashem Hosseini	Iran
silver medal	Zhao Shuai	China
bronze medal	Ho Chia-hsin	Chinese Taipei
bronze medal	Cho Gang-min	South Korea

The men's bantamweight (63 kilograms) event at the 2018 Asian Games took place on 22 August 2018 at Jakarta Convention Center Plenary Hall, Jakarta, Indonesia.

== Schedule ==
All times are Western Indonesia Time (UTC+07:00)

Date	Time	Event
Wednesday, 22 August 2018	10:00	Round of 32
Wednesday, 22 August 2018	10:00	Round of 16
Wednesday, 22 August 2018	10:00	Quarterfinals
Wednesday, 22 August 2018	16:00	Semifinals
Wednesday, 22 August 2018	16:00	Final

== Results ==
=== Final ===
Final
Zhao Shuai (CHN)	11
Mirhashem Hosseini (IRI)	17

=== Top half ===
Round of 32
Claudio Mousaco (TLS)	10
Khurram Mehtarshoev (TJK)	32
Molomyn Tümenbayar (MGL)	23
Yeshi Dorji (BHU)	2
Ahmad Nor Iman Hakim (MAS)	32
Phounathone Souksavath (LAO)	12
Ahmad Ali Bakhshi (AFG)	13
Bir Bahadur Mahara (NEP)	24
Ahmed Al-Khulaqi (YEM)	15
Hassan Shubbar (UAE)	18

Round of 16
Zhao Shuai (CHN)	24
Khurram Mehtarshoev (TJK)	4
Molomyn Tümenbayar (MGL)	26
Ahmad Nor Iman Hakim (MAS)	5
Kazybek Baktiyaruly (KAZ)	30
Bir Bahadur Mahara (NEP)	19
Hassan Shubbar (UAE)	1
Ho Chia-hsin (TPE)	22

Quarterfinals
Zhao Shuai (CHN)	25
Molomyn Tümenbayar (MGL)	5
Kazybek Baktiyaruly (KAZ)	0
Ho Chia-hsin (TPE)	21

Semifinals
Zhao Shuai (CHN)	8
Ho Chia-hsin (TPE)	7

=== Bottom half ===
Round of 32
Hamad Al-Mabrouk (KSA)	29
Tawin Hanprab (THA)	21
Aung Kyaw Kyaw (MYA)	0
Haroon Khan (PAK)	33
Sardor Toirov (UZB)	25
Chhun Soklong (CAM)	5
Chalinda Liyanage (SRI)	21
Masanojo Honma (JPN)	18
Jin Agojo (PHI)	41
Ahmed Dghbas (QAT)	28

Round of 16
Cho Gang-min (KOR)	22
Hamad Al-Mabrouk (KSA)	10
Haroon Khan (PAK)	21
Ibrahim Zarman (INA)	25
Sardor Toirov (UZB)	22
Chalinda Liyanage (SRI)	6
Jin Agojo (PHI)	2
Mirhashem Hosseini (IRI)	24

Quarterfinals
Cho Gang-min (KOR)	36
Ibrahim Zarman (INA)	25
Sardor Toirov (UZB)	9
Mirhashem Hosseini (IRI)	29

Semifinals
Cho Gang-min (KOR)	29
Mirhashem Hosseini (IRI)	37
