= Ho Chia-hsin =

Taiwanese taekwondo practitioner

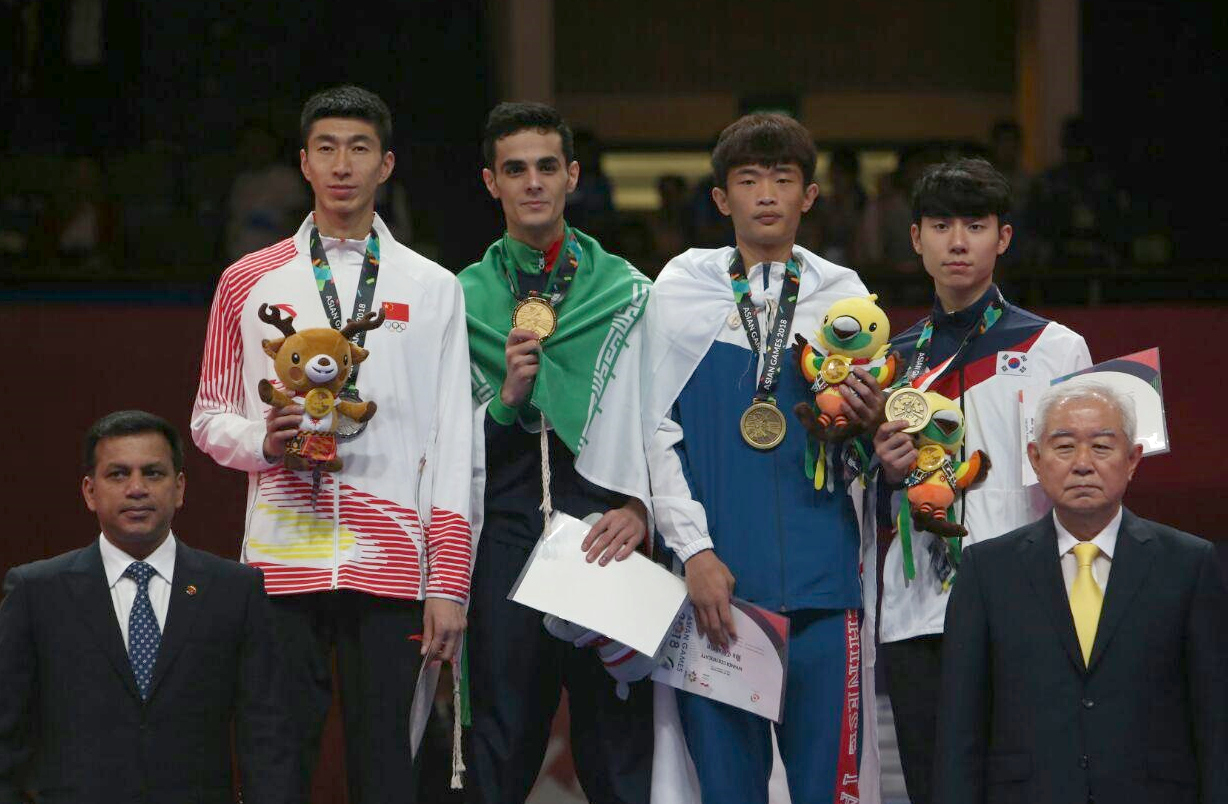
- Ho Chia-hsin in 2018 (top row, second from right)

Personal information
- Born: 1 November 1997 (age 28)

Sport
- Country: Chinese Taipei
- Sport: Taekwondo
Medal record
Men's taekwondo
Representing Chinese Taipei
Asian Games
Bronze medal – third place	2018 Jakarta	63 kg
Asian Indoor and Martial Arts Games
Bronze medal – third place	2017 Ashgabat	63 kg
Summer Universiade
Silver medal – second place	2017 Taipei	Team Kyorugi
Bronze medal – third place	2019 Naples	Team Kyorugi

Ho Chia-hsin (born 1 November 1997) is a Taiwanese taekwondo practitioner. In 2018, he won one of the bronze medals in the men's −63 kg event at the 2018 Asian Games held in Jakarta, Indonesia.

He competed in the men's bantamweight event at the 2017 World Taekwondo Championships held in Muju County, South Korea. A few months later, he won one of the bronze medals in the men's −63 kg event at the 2017 Asian Indoor and Martial Arts Games held in Ashgabat, Turkmenistan.

In 2019, he competed in the men's bantamweight event at the 2019 World Taekwondo Championships in Manchester, United Kingdom. He was eliminated in his third match by Jaouad Achab of Belgium. In the same year, he won one of the bronze medals in the men's Team Kyorugi event at the 2019 Summer Universiade held in Naples, Italy.
