= Lorenzo Romano =

Italian rugby union player

- Born: 31 March 1989 (age 37) Bagno a Ripoli, Italy
- Height: 1.86 m (6 ft 1 in)
- Weight: 115 kg (18 st 2 lb; 254 lb)

Rugby union career
- Position: Prop
Youth career
- Parma
Senior career
Years	Team	Apps	(Points)
2009−2011	Crociati Parma	27	(0)
2011−2012	Aironi	18	(0)
2012	Saracens	3	(0)
2013	Wasps	3	(0)
2013−2014	Calvisano	24	(0)
2014−2015	Zebre	6	(0)
2015−2016	Viadana	9	(0)
2016−2017	Bourgoin-Jallieu	6	(0)
- Correct as of 29 May 2020
International career
Years	Team	Apps	(Points)
2009	Italy Under 20	9	(0)
2011−2014	Emerging Italy	2	(0)
2012	Italy	2	(0)
- Correct as of 30 May 2020

Lorenzo Romano (born in Bagno a Ripoli on 31 March 1989) is a retired Italian rugby union player. His usual position was Prop.

A former judoka, he won a silver medal at the 2005 European Cadet Judo Championships.

In the 2014–15 Pro12 season, he played for Zebre.

From 2011 to 2014, Romano was named in the Emerging Italy squad and he represented Italy on 2 occasions in 2012.

In 2009, he was also named in the Italy Under 20 squad.
