= Iordanis Konstantinidis (taekwondo) =

German taekwondo practitioner

Personal information
- Nationality: German
- Born: 10 June 1998 (age 28) Heidenheim an der Brenz, Germany
- Height: 1.78 m (5 ft 10 in)

Sport
- Country: Germany
- Sport: Taekwondo
- Event: –63 kg
- Club: TSV Dachau 1865 e.V.
- Team: GER
- Turned pro: 2018
- Coached by: Demirhan Aydin, Reinhard Langer
- Retired: 2026
- Now coaching: Ela Aydin Konstantinidis

Achievements and titles
- World finals: 3rd place, bronze medalist(s)
- Regional finals: 3rd place, bronze medalist(s)
- National finals: 1st place, gold medalist(s)
- Highest world ranking: 7 (2021, 2022)
Medal record
Men's taekwondo
Representing Germany
World Championships
| Bronze medal – third place | 2019 Manchester | 63 kg |
European U21 Championships
| Bronze medal – third place | 2017 Sofia | 63 kg |
European Junior Championships
| Bronze medal – third place | 2015 Daugavpils | 63 kg |
- Updated on 4 March 2026

Iordanis Konstantinidis (born 10 June 1998) is a German taekwondo athlete and former national team member. He is the 2019 world bronze medallist in the 63 kg weight category.

== Career ==
=== Junior ===
Iordanis Konstantinidis began practicing taekwondo at the age of seven after discovering the sport through martial arts films. He began training in Dachau alongside fellow national team member Ela Aydin and first represented the German national team in a continental competition at the 2013 European Junior Championships in Porto.

In the years following, Konstantinidis took part in international G-ranked competitions as well as the 2014 World Juniors Taekwondo Championships and the 2015 European U21 Championships.

In 2015, he won his first major medal at the international stage, a bronze at the European Junior Taekwondo Championships in Daugavpils. In 2017, Konstantinidis won another bronze medal at the European U21 Championships in Sofia.

=== Senior ===
Konstantinidis started competing at the senior level in 2017, when he participated in the World Championships in Muju. The following year, he won a silver medal at the 2018 Multi European Games in Plodiv.

At the 2019 World Championships in Manchester, he beat Dominican athlete Bernardo Pié 12 to 9 in the quarter-finals and lost to China's Zhao Shuai 8 to 10 in the semi-finals to win a bronze medal in the men's 63 kg competition.

Konstantinidis took part in the 2021 and 2022 European Championships. In 2022, he won the gold medal at the Multi European Games held in Sofia. Konstantinidis participated in the 2023 World Championships in Baku, he won his latest international medal - a bronze - at the 2023 Albanian Open in Tirana. In January 2026, he formally announced his retirement and outlined his plans to continue supporting the sport of taekwondo in a coaching capacity.

== Personal life ==
Konstantinidis had joined the sports promotion group of the Bundeswehr (German: Sportfördergruppe der Bundeswehr) in 2018 and had since been a Soldier-Athlete (German: Sportsoldat) during his time as a professional taekwondo athlete until his retirement in 2026.
