= Taekwondo at the 2017 Summer Universiade =

Taekwondo competition

Taekwondo at the XXIX Summer Universiade
- Venues: Taoyuan Arena
- Dates: 20–26 August
- Competitors: 563

Taekwondo was contested at the 2017 Summer Universiade from August 20 to 26 at the Taoyuan Arena in Taoyuan at the metropolitan area of Taipei, [Taiwan.

== Medal summary ==
=== Medal table ===
Rank	Nation	Gold	Silver	Bronze	Total
1	South Korea	6	6	3	15
2	Iran	4	1	6	11
3	Russia	3	0	3	6
4	Turkey	2	1	1	4
5	Serbia	2	0	0	2
6	Chinese Taipei*	1	5	3	9
7	Azerbaijan	1	1	3	5
8	United States	1	1	2	4
9	Vietnam	1	0	3	4
10	Thailand	1	0	1	2
11	Ukraine	1	0	0	1
12	Poland	0	2	1	3
13	Kazakhstan	0	1	1	2
14	Argentina	0	1	0	1
14	Brazil	0	1	0	1
14	Cyprus	0	1	0	1
14	Portugal	0	1	0	1
14	Spain	0	1	0	1
19	Mexico	0	0	7	7
20	Croatia	0	0	2	2
20	Germany	0	0	2	2
22	Armenia	0	0	1	1
22	Australia	0	0	1	1
22	China	0	0	1	1
22	France	0	0	1	1
22	Italy	0	0	1	1
22	Jordan	0	0	1	1
22	Netherlands	0	0	1	1
22	Norway	0	0	1	1
Totals (29 entries)		23	23	46	92

=== Men's events ===
Event	Gold	Silver	Bronze
–54kg (finweight)	Armin Hadipour; Iran	Heo Seong-joo; South Korea	Bailey Lewis; Australia
–54kg (finweight)	Armin Hadipour; Iran	Heo Seong-joo; South Korea	Cesar Roman Rodriguez; Mexico
–58kg (flyweight)	Hadi Tiran; Iran	Rui Bragança; Portugal	Tawin Hanprab; Thailand
–58kg (flyweight)	Hadi Tiran; Iran	Rui Bragança; Portugal	Gulzhigit Kochkorbaev; Russia
–63kg (bantamweight)	Mirhashem Hosseini; Iran	Lucas Guzmán; Argentina	Mahammad Mammadov; Azerbaijan
–63kg (bantamweight)	Mirhashem Hosseini; Iran	Lucas Guzmán; Argentina	Lovre Brečić; Croatia
–68kg (featherweight)	Boris Krasnov; Russia	Aykhan Taghizade; Azerbaijan	Ahmad Abughaush; Jordan
–68kg (featherweight)	Boris Krasnov; Russia	Aykhan Taghizade; Azerbaijan	Sergey Vardazaryan; Armenia
–74kg (lightweight)	Jaysen Ishida; United States	Ramin Hosseingholizadeh; Iran	Yang Tsung-yeh; Chinese Taipei
–74kg (lightweight)	Jaysen Ishida; United States	Ramin Hosseingholizadeh; Iran	Said Guliyev; Azerbaijan
–80kg (welterweight)	Milad Beigi; Azerbaijan	Raúl Martinez; Spain	Richard Ordemann; Norway
–80kg (welterweight)	Milad Beigi; Azerbaijan	Raúl Martinez; Spain	Liu Wei-ting; Chinese Taipei
–87kg (middleweight)	Saeid Rajabi; Iran	Lee Seung-hwan; South Korea	Rafael Kamalov; Russia
–87kg (middleweight)	Saeid Rajabi; Iran	Lee Seung-hwan; South Korea	Bartosz Kołecki; Poland
+87kg (heavyweight)	Rafael Ayukaev; Russia	Maicon Andrade; Brazil	Radik Isayev; Azerbaijan
+87kg (heavyweight)	Rafael Ayukaev; Russia	Maicon Andrade; Brazil	Jonathan Healy; United States
Individual Poomsae	Oh Chang-hyun; South Korea	Edward Jeong; United States	Mehdi Jamali; Iran
Individual Poomsae	Oh Chang-hyun; South Korea	Edward Jeong; United States	Chen Chien-chuan; Chinese Taipei
Team Poomsae	South Korea (KOR); Bae Jong-beom; Jo Jeong-hun; Ji Ho-chul	Chinese Taipei (TPE); Chang Wei-chieh; Hsieh Ming-yang; Huang Chia-juang	Vietnam (VIE); Hứa Văn Huy; Hồ Thanh Phong; Nguyễn Thiên Phụng
Team Poomsae	South Korea (KOR); Bae Jong-beom; Jo Jeong-hun; Ji Ho-chul	Chinese Taipei (TPE); Chang Wei-chieh; Hsieh Ming-yang; Huang Chia-juang	Iran (IRI); Mehdi Jamali; Mohammad Javad Kheiri; Amir Reza Mehraban
Team Kyorugi	Russia (RUS); Maksat Allalyev; Bogdan Grechkin; Rafail Ayukaev; Bulat Magomedov	Chinese Taipei (TPE); Huang Yu-jen; Yang Tsung-yeh; Liu Wei-ting; Ho Chia-hsin	Kazakhstan (KAZ); Marat Abdikaliyev; Nursultan Mamayev; Sultan Kalibekuly; Smaiyl Duisebay
Team Kyorugi	Russia (RUS); Maksat Allalyev; Bogdan Grechkin; Rafail Ayukaev; Bulat Magomedov	Chinese Taipei (TPE); Huang Yu-jen; Yang Tsung-yeh; Liu Wei-ting; Ho Chia-hsin	South Korea (KOR); Kim Hyeon-seung; Shin Dong-yun; Lee Seung-hwan; Heo Seong-joo

=== Women's events ===
Event	Gold	Silver	Bronze
–46kg (finweight)	Iryna Romoldanova; Ukraine	Kyriaki Kouttouki; Cyprus	Sarah Zohra Adidou; France
–46kg (finweight)	Iryna Romoldanova; Ukraine	Kyriaki Kouttouki; Cyprus	Shae Rom Kim; Germany
–49kg (flyweight)	Panipak Wongpattanakit; Thailand	İpek Çidem; Turkey	Kim Joo-hwi; South Korea
–49kg (flyweight)	Panipak Wongpattanakit; Thailand	İpek Çidem; Turkey	Itzel Manjarrez; Mexico
–53kg (bantamweight)	Tijana Bogdanović; Serbia	Lim Geum-byeol; South Korea	Madeline Folgmann; Germany
–53kg (bantamweight)	Tijana Bogdanović; Serbia	Lim Geum-byeol; South Korea	Nahid Kiani; Iran
–57kg (featherweight)	Hatice Kübra İlgün; Turkey	Lee Ah-reum; South Korea	Anisia Chelokhsaeva; Russia
–57kg (featherweight)	Hatice Kübra İlgün; Turkey	Lee Ah-reum; South Korea	Paulina Armeria; Mexico
–62kg (lightweight)	İrem Yaman; Turkey	Moon Ji-soo; South Korea	Melissa Oviedo; Mexico
–62kg (lightweight)	İrem Yaman; Turkey	Moon Ji-soo; South Korea	Daniela Rotolo; Italy
–67kg (welterweight)	Kim Jan-di; South Korea	Chuang Chia-chia; Chinese Taipei	Victoria Heredia; Mexico
–67kg (welterweight)	Kim Jan-di; South Korea	Chuang Chia-chia; Chinese Taipei	Melika Mirhosseini; Iran
–73kg (middleweight)	Lee Da-bin; South Korea	Cansel Deniz; Kazakhstan	Reshmie Oogink; Netherlands
–73kg (middleweight)	Lee Da-bin; South Korea	Cansel Deniz; Kazakhstan	Sude Bulut; Turkey
+73kg (heavyweight)	An Sae-bom; South Korea	Aleksandra Kowalczuk; Poland	Briseida Acosta; Mexico
+73kg (heavyweight)	An Sae-bom; South Korea	Aleksandra Kowalczuk; Poland	Melani Adamić-Golić; Croatia
Individual Poomsae	Nguyễn Thị Lệ Kim; Vietnam	Lin Kan-yu; Chinese Taipei	Adalis Monuz; United States
Individual Poomsae	Nguyễn Thị Lệ Kim; Vietnam	Lin Kan-yu; Chinese Taipei	Fatemeh Hesam; Iran
Team Poomsae	South Korea (KOR); Gwak Yeo-won; Yun Ji-hye; Park So-jeong	Chinese Taipei (TPE); Chen Yi-hsuan; Lee Ying-hsian; Chen Hsiang-ting	Vietnam (VIE); Nguyễn Thị Lệ Kim; Ngô Thị Thùy Dung; Châu Tuyết Vân
Team Poomsae	South Korea (KOR); Gwak Yeo-won; Yun Ji-hye; Park So-jeong	Chinese Taipei (TPE); Chen Yi-hsuan; Lee Ying-hsian; Chen Hsiang-ting	China (CHN); Wu Huaying; Tang Yuqi; Ji Yuhan
Team Kyorugi	Serbia (SRB); Aleksandra Radmilović; Ana Bajić; Iris Jović Vujaković; Tijana Bogdanović	Poland (POL); Aleksandra Krzemieniecka; Magdalena Leporowska; Patrycja Adamkiewicz; Hanna Okoniewska	South Korea (KOR); Kim Jan-di; Lee Da-bin; Lim Geum-byeol; Lee Ah-reum
Team Kyorugi	Serbia (SRB); Aleksandra Radmilović; Ana Bajić; Iris Jović Vujaković; Tijana Bogdanović	Poland (POL); Aleksandra Krzemieniecka; Magdalena Leporowska; Patrycja Adamkiewicz; Hanna Okoniewska	Mexico (MEX); Paulina Armería; Victoria Heredia; Melissa Oviedo; Renata García

=== Mixed events ===
Event	Gold	Silver	Bronze
Team Poomsae	Chinese Taipei (TPE); Li Cheng-gang; Su Chia-en	South Korea (KOR); Kang Min-seo; Jeong Hwa-kyung	Vietnam (VIE); Châu Tuyết Vân; Nguyễn Thiên Phụng
Team Poomsae	Chinese Taipei (TPE); Li Cheng-gang; Su Chia-en	South Korea (KOR); Kang Min-seo; Jeong Hwa-kyung	Iran (IRI); Amir Reza Mehraban; Mahsa Sadeghi
