= Saeid Rajabi (taekwondo) =

Iranian taekwondo practitioner

Saeid Rajabi سعید رجبی
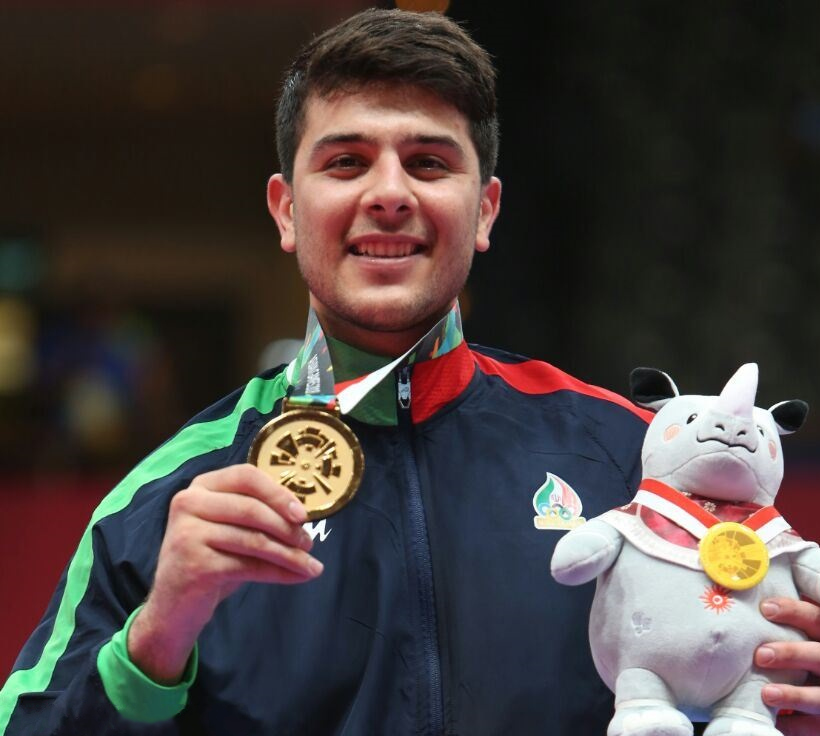
- Rajabi at the 2018 Asian Games

Personal information
- Nationality: Iranian
- Born: 5 August 1996 (age 29) Mianeh, East Azerbaijan

Sport
- Sport: Taekwondo
- Weight class: +80 kg
- Coached by: Fariborz Askari
Medal record
Representing Iran
Asian Games
Gold medal – first place	2018 Jakarta	+80 kg
Asian Championships
Gold medal – first place	2016 Manila	80 kg
Bronze medal – third place	2018 Ho Chi Minh City	+87 kg
Military World Games
Gold medal – first place	2015 Mungyeong	+87 kg
Universiade
Gold medal – first place	2015 Gwangju	80 kg
Gold medal – first place	2017 Taipei	87 kg

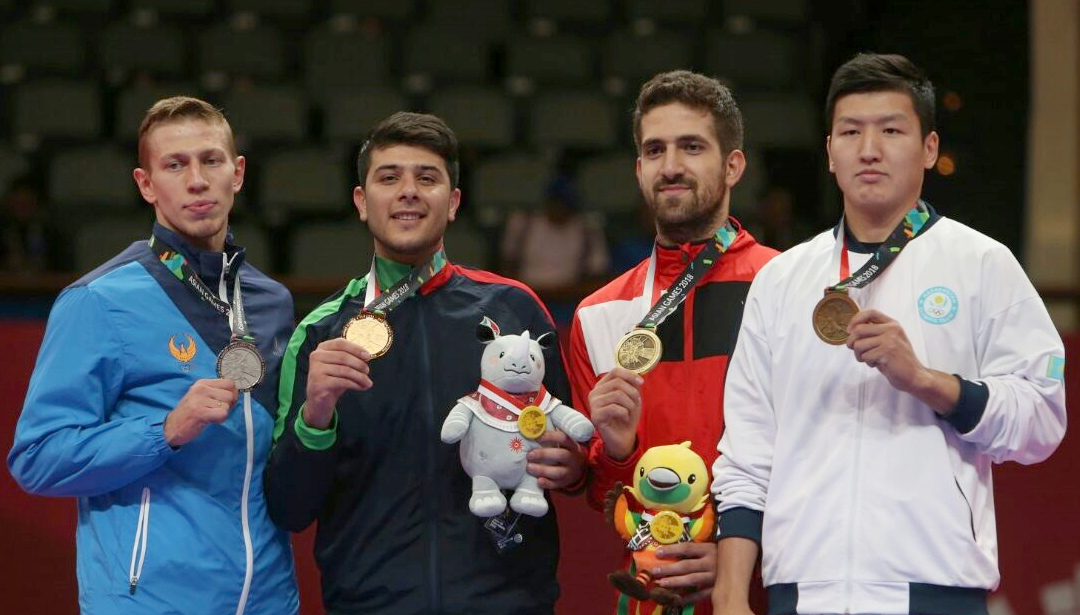
2018 Asian Games podium

Saeid Rajabi (Persian: سعید رجبی; born August 5, 1996) is an Iranian heavyweight taekwondo competitor. He won gold medals at the 2016 Asian Championships and 2018 Asian Games.
