= Soroush Ahmadi =

Iranian taekwondo practitioner

Personal information
- Nationality: Iranian
- Born: 17 September 1996 (age 29) Juybar, Iran

Sport
- Sport: Taekwondo
- Weight class: 63 kg
Medal record
Representing Iran
World Championships
Silver medal – second place	2019 Manchester	63 kg
Asian Championships
Silver medal – second place	2018 Ho Chi Minh City	63 kg
Grand Prix
Bronze medal – third place	2019 Sofia	68 kg
Universiade
Gold medal – first place	2019 Naples	63 kg
Gold medal – first place	2019 Naples	Team

Soroush Ahmadi (Persian: سروش احمدی, born 17 November 1996 in Juybar) is an Iranian taekwondo competitor. He won the silver medal at the 2019 World Taekwondo Championships on the men's bantamweights.
