= Farhad Piroutpour =

Iranian volleyball player (born 1991)

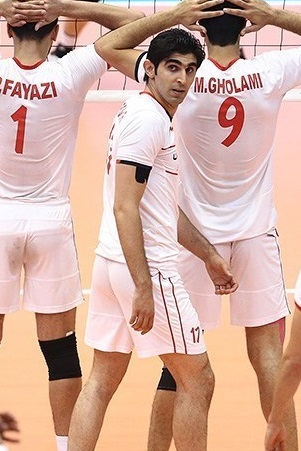

Personal information
- Full name: Farhad Piroutpour
- Born: February 21, 1991 (age 35); Mahabad, Iran
- Height: 1.95 m (6 ft 5 in)
- Weight: 95 kg (209 lb)
- Spike: 3.60 m (142 in)
- Block: 3.50 m (138 in)

Volleyball information
- Position: Opposite
- Current club: Urmia

Career
Years	Teams
2011-	(Iran) Urmia

National team
2015-	Iran
Honours
Representing Iran
Men's volleyball
Asian Championship
Silver medal – second place	2015 Tehran	Team

Farhad Piroutpour (Persian: فرهاد پیروت پور, born 21 February 1991 in Mahabad) is an Iranian volleyball player who plays as an opposite hitter for the Iranian national team. He made his debut for the national team in the game against USA in the 2015 World League. He was part of national team in the 2015 Asian Championship.

== Honours ==
=== National team ===
- Asian Championship
  - Silver medal (1): 2015

=== Individual ===
- Best opposite spiker: 2015 Asian Championship
