= Melika Mirhosseini =

Iranian taekwondo practitioner

Personal information
- Full name: Melika Mirhosseini Vakili
- Born: 2 March 1996 (age 30) Tehran, Iran

Sport
- Country: Iran
- Sport: Taekwondo
Medal record
Women's taekwondo
Representing Iran
Asian Championships
Silver medal – second place	2021 Beirut	–67 kg
Silver medal – second place	2024 Da Nang	–73 kg
Bronze medal – third place	2016 Pasay	+73 kg
Asian Games
Bronze medal – third place	2022 Hangzhou	67 kg
Islamic Solidarity Games
Silver medal – second place	2017 Baku	–73 kg
Bronze medal – third place	2025 Riyadh	+70 kg
Summer Universiade
Bronze medal – third place	2017 Taipei	–67 kg
Bronze medal – third place	2019 Naples	–73 kg

Melika Mirhosseini (Persian: ملیکا میرحسینی وکیلی, born 2 March 1996) is an Iranian taekwondo practitioner.

== Career ==
In 2017, she won one of the bronze medals in the women's 67 kg event at the Summer Universiade held in Taipei, Taiwan. Two years later, she also won one of the bronze medals in the women's 73 kg event at the 2019 Summer Universiade held in Naples, Italy.

In 2021, she won the silver medal in the women's 67 kg event at the Asian Taekwondo Championships held in Beirut, Lebanon and won the silver medal in the 2024 Asian Championships. She also won the silver medal in her event at the 2017 Islamic Solidarity Games held in Baku, Azerbaijan.
