= Boris Krasnov =

Russian taekwondo practitioner

Personal information
- Nationality: Russian
- Born: July 23, 1997
- Height: 195 cm (6 ft 5 in)

Sport
- Country: Russia
- Sport: Taekwondo
- Event: –68 kg
- Coached by: A. M. Askerov, T. M. Askerov
Medal record
Representing Russia
Men's taekwondo
Summer Universiade
Gold medal – first place	2017 Taipei	–68 kg
European Junior Championships
Silver medal – second place	2015 Bukarest	–63 kg
Silver medal – second place	2017 Sofia	–68 kg
World Youth Championships
Gold medal – first place	2012 Sharm El-Sheikh	–45 kg

Boris Igorevich Krasnov (Russian: Борис Игоревич Краснов; born 23 July 1997) is a Russian taekwondo athlete. In 2012, Krasnov won gold at the World Youth Championships in Sharm-el-Sheikh. His best senior result to date was winning gold at the 2017 Summer Universiade, defeating 2016 Olympic champion Ahmad Abughaush in the semifinals.
