= Erfan Ahangarian =

Iranian Wushu athlete

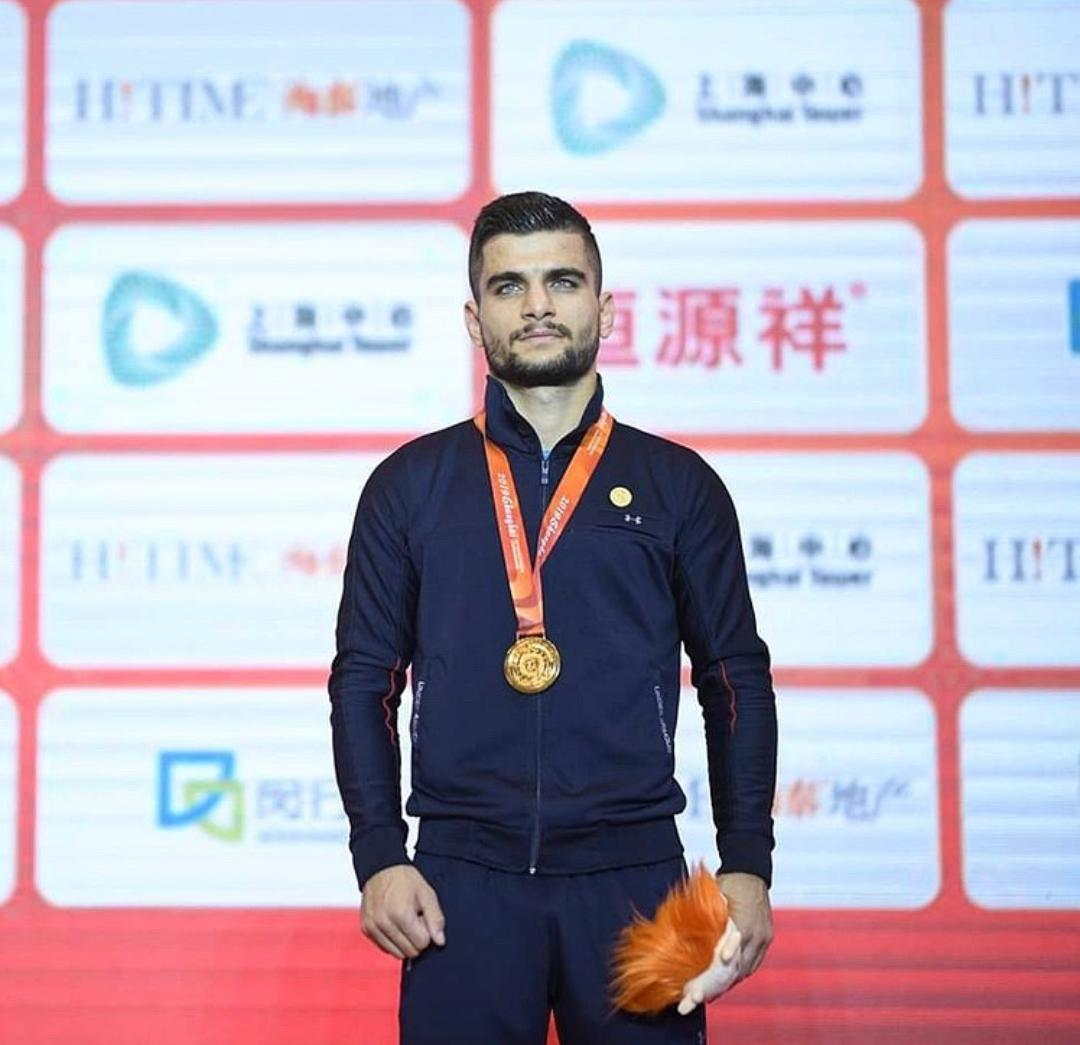

Personal information
- Nationality: Iranian
- Born: 22 November 1996 (age 29) Salman Shahr, Mazandaran, Iran
- Height: 1.73 m (5 ft 8 in)
- Weight: 65 kg (143 lb)
- Website: Official Instagram Profile

Sport
- Country: Iran
- Sport: Wushu
- Event: Sanda
Medal record
Representing Iran
Men's sanda
Asian Games
Gold medal – first place	2018 Jakarta	60 kg
World Championships
Gold medal – first place	2019 Shanghai	65 Kg
Summer Universiade
Gold medal – first place	2017 Taipei	60 Kg
Islamic Solidarity Games
Gold medal – first place	2017 Baku	60 Kg
Asian Championships
Gold medal – first place	2016 Taiwan	60 Kg

Erfan Ahangarian (Persian: عرفان آهنگریان; born 1996) is an Iranian wushu athlete. He won the gold medal at the 2018 Asian Games in Jakarta, Indonesia. He won gold medal at the 2019 World Wushu Championships in Shanghai in the men's Sanda 60 kg category.

== Achievements ==
- Gold Medal at World championships 2019 Shanghai, 65kg.
- Silver Medal at World cup 2016 Xian, 65kg
- Gold Medal at World universiade games 2017 Taiwan, 60kg
- Gold Medal at Islamic solidarity games 2017 Baku, 60 kg
- Gold Medal atAsian games 2018 Jakarta, 60kg
- Gold Medal at Asian championships 2016 Taiwan, 60kg
- Gold Medal at world junior championships 2014 Antalia, 56kg
- Gold Medal at Pars Cup International Tournament 2015 Tehran, 60Kg
- Gold Medal at Pars Cup International Tournament 2018 Semnan, 60kg
