= Saurav Sharma =

Indian taekwondo athlete

Personal information
- Nationality: Indian
- Born: 24 June 1993 (age 33) Sonipat, Haryana
- Height: 1.78 m (5.8 ft)
- Weight: 63 kg (139 lb)

Sport
- Country: India
- Sport: Martial art
- Event: Taekwondo

Saurav Sharma is an Indian taekwondo fighter who has represented India at the Asian Championships, 2018 at Ho Chi Minh City, Vietnam . He is supported by the GoSports Foundation through the Rahul Dravid Athlete Mentorship Programme. In 2017, he was awarded the Bhima Award by the state government of Haryana .

== Early and personal life ==
Saurav Sharama was born on 24 June 1993 in Sonipat district of Haryana. His father is a farmer and his mother is a housewife. Saurav started playing taekwondo in 2007 at the age of 14. After that he represented India in many international tournaments.

== Achievements ==
- Commonwealth championship 2017, Montreal, Canada - silver
- South Asian games 2019 - silver medal
- India open ranking tournament 2019 Hyderabad - bronze
- Asian games -2014 incheon Korea - 5th position
