= Fatemeh Heidari =

Iranian wushu practitioner (born 1996)

Personal information
- Native name: فاطمه حیدری
- Nationality: Iranian
- Born: 12 September 1996 (age 28); Tehran, Iran

Sport
- Country: Iran
- Sport: Wushu

Fatemeh Heidari (Persian: فاطمه حیدری; born 12 September 1996 in Tehran) is an Iranian Wushu athlete.

Prior to wushu, she was active in the field of gymnastics and in addition to winning the championship in Iran, she was also a member of the Iranian national gymnastics team, but since at that time, Iranian women did not participate in international competitions in the field of gymnastics, she started wushu in 2005. In 2011, she became a member of the Iranian national wushu team. She has won the Iranian Taolu Championship 10 times in her sports record, and a third place in the 2017 Asian Games in Chinese Taipei, a third place in the World Student Games(Universiade) and a ninth place in the 2018 Jakarta Asian Olympics are other sports honors of Fatemeh Heidari.
