= Mirhashem Hosseini =

Iranian taekwondo practitioner

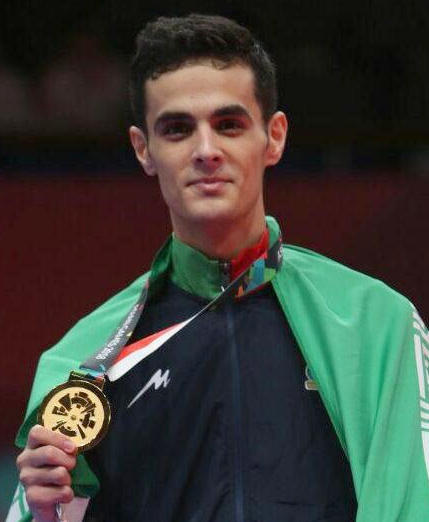
- Hosseini at the 2018 Asian Games

Personal information
- Nationality: Iranian
- Born: 28 October 1998 (age 27) Mianeh, East Azerbaijan, Iran
- Education: Physical education
- Height: 190 cm (6 ft 3 in)
- Weight: 68 kg (150 lb)

Sport
- Sport: Taekwondo
- Weight class: Bantamweight; Featherweight
- University team: Islamic Azad University
- Club: Shahrdari Varamin
- Coached by: Bijan Moghanloo (national)
Medal record
Event	1st	2nd	3rd
World Championships	–	1	–
Asian Games	1	–	–
Asian Championships	1	1	–
World Cup	1	–	–
Grand Slam	0	0	1
World Grand Prix	2	2	–
Universiade	4	1	–
Representing Iran
World Championships
Silver medal – second place	2017 Muju	63 kg
Asian Games
Gold medal – first place	2018 Jakarta	63 kg
Asian Championships
Gold medal – first place	2016 Manila	58 kg
Silver medal – second place	2022 Chuncheon	74 kg
Grand Slam
Bronze medal – third place	2023 Wuxi	80 kg
Universiade
Gold medal – first place	2017 Taipei	63 kg
Gold medal – first place	2019 Naples	68 kg
Gold medal – first place	2019 Naples	Team
Gold medal – first place	2021 Chengdu	74 kg
Silver medal – second place	2021 Chengdu	Team
- Updated on 17 December 2023

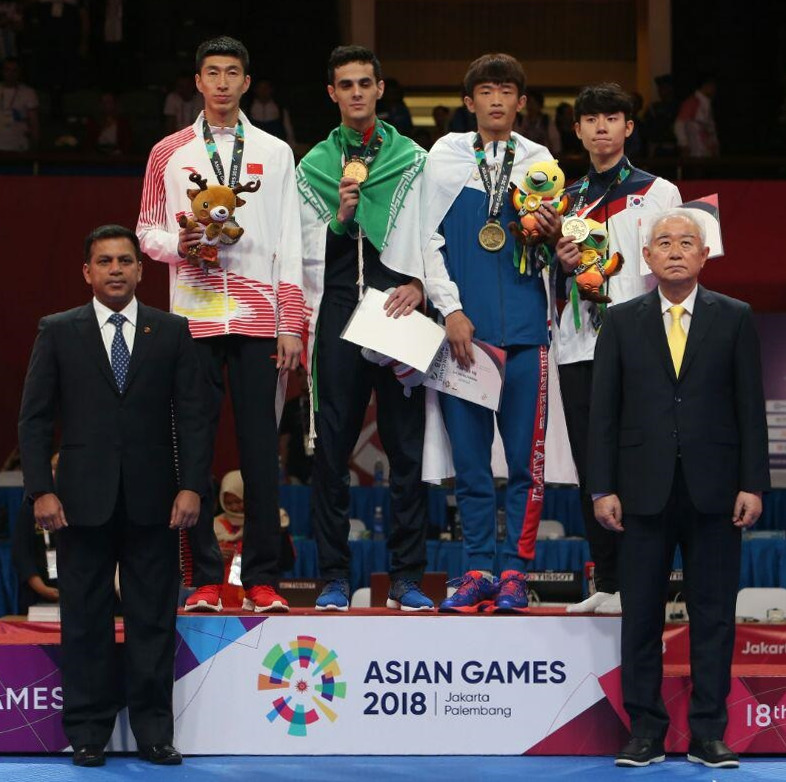
2018 Asian Games podium

Mirhashem Hosseini (Persian: میرهاشم حسینی; born 28 October 1998) is an Iranian taekwondo competitor. He won gold medals at the 2016 Asian championships, 2017 Universiade and 2018 Asian Games, placing second at the 2017 World Championships. He competed at the 2020 Summer Olympics in Tokyo, Japan.

In 2016, he won the gold medal in the men's −58 kg event at the 2016 Asian Taekwondo Championships in Pasay, Philippines. He has been licensed to compete in the Tokyo Olympics.
