= Billiards at the Summer World University Games =

Billiards competitions

- Events: 4 (men: 2; women: 2)

Games
- 1959; 1960; 1961; 1962; 1963; 1964; 1965; 1966; 1967; 1968; 1970; 1970; 1973; 1972; 1975; 1975; 1977; 1978; 1979; 1981; 1983; 1985; 1987; 1989; 1991; 1993; 1995; 1997; 1999; 2001; 2003; 2005; 2007; 2009; 2011; 2013; 2015; 2017; 2019; 2021; 2025

Billiards competitions have been held in the Universiade only in the 2017 Summer Universiade as an optional sport.

== Events ==
Event	17	Years
Men's singles 9-ball	•	1
Men's doubles 9-ball	•	1
Women's singles 9-ball	•	1
Women's doubles 9-ball	•	1

== Medal table ==
Rank	Nation	Gold	Silver	Bronze	Total
1	Chinese Taipei (TPE)	4	1	1	6
2	Mongolia (MGL)	0	1	1	2
3	Japan (JPN)	0	1	0	1
3	South Korea (KOR)	0	1	0	1
5	Norway (NOR)	0	0	2	2
Totals (5 entries)		4	4	4	12
