= Tianwei =

Tianwei may refer to:

- Tianwei, Changhua (Chinese: 田尾鄉), township in Changhua County, Taiwan
- Feng Tianwei (Chinese: 冯天薇; born 1986), Singaporean table tennis player
- Tan Tianwei (Chinese: 谭天伟), Chinese professor
