= Taipei International Flora Exposition 2010 =

Garden festival in Taipei, Taiwan

Taipei International Flora Exposition
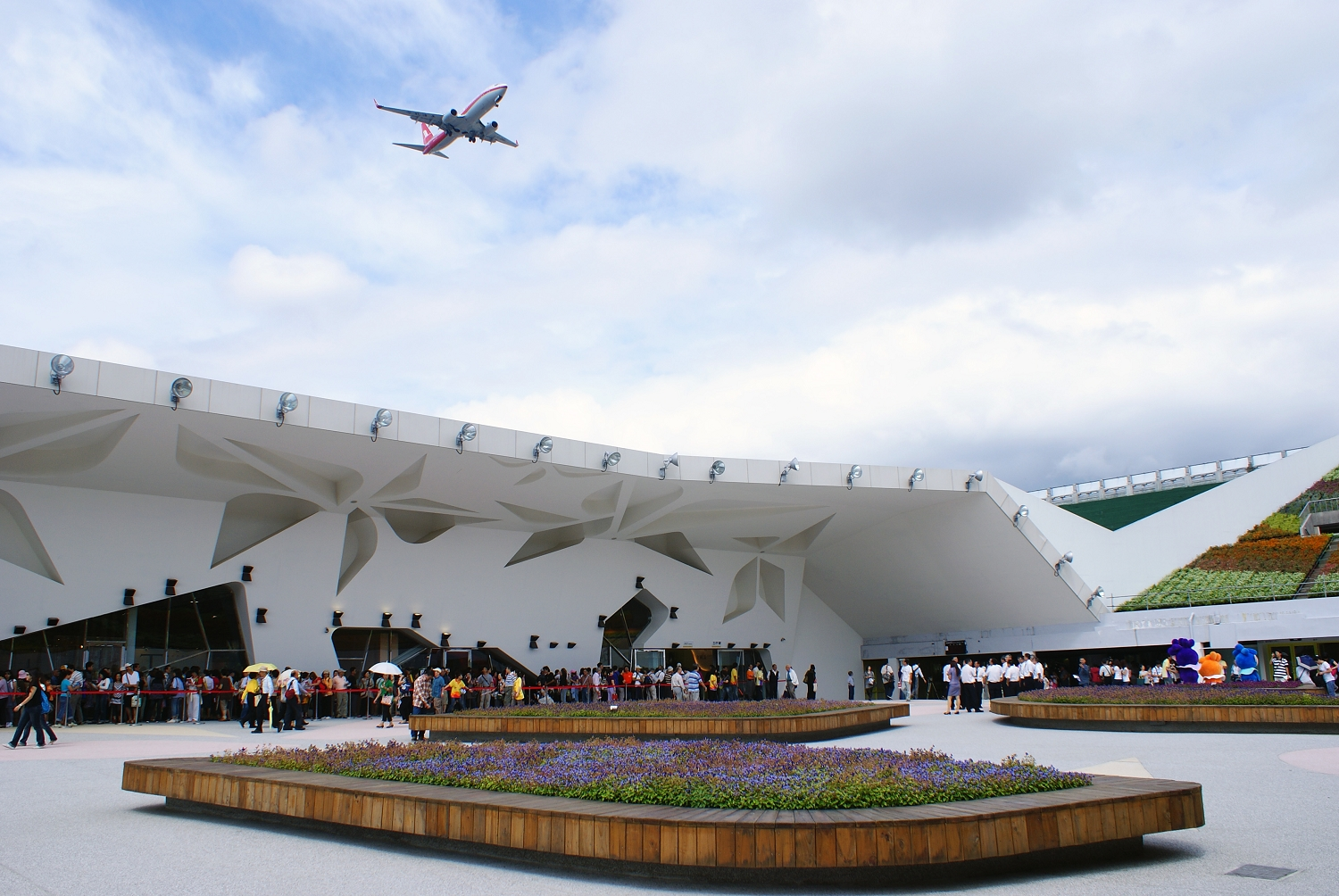
- The EXPO Dome

Overview
- BIE-class: Unrecognized exposition
- Name: Taipei International Flora Exposition
- Visitors: over 8.9 million

Location
- Country: Taiwan
- City: Taipei

Timeline
- Opening: 6 November 2010
- Closure: 25 April 2011

Taipei International Flora Exposition
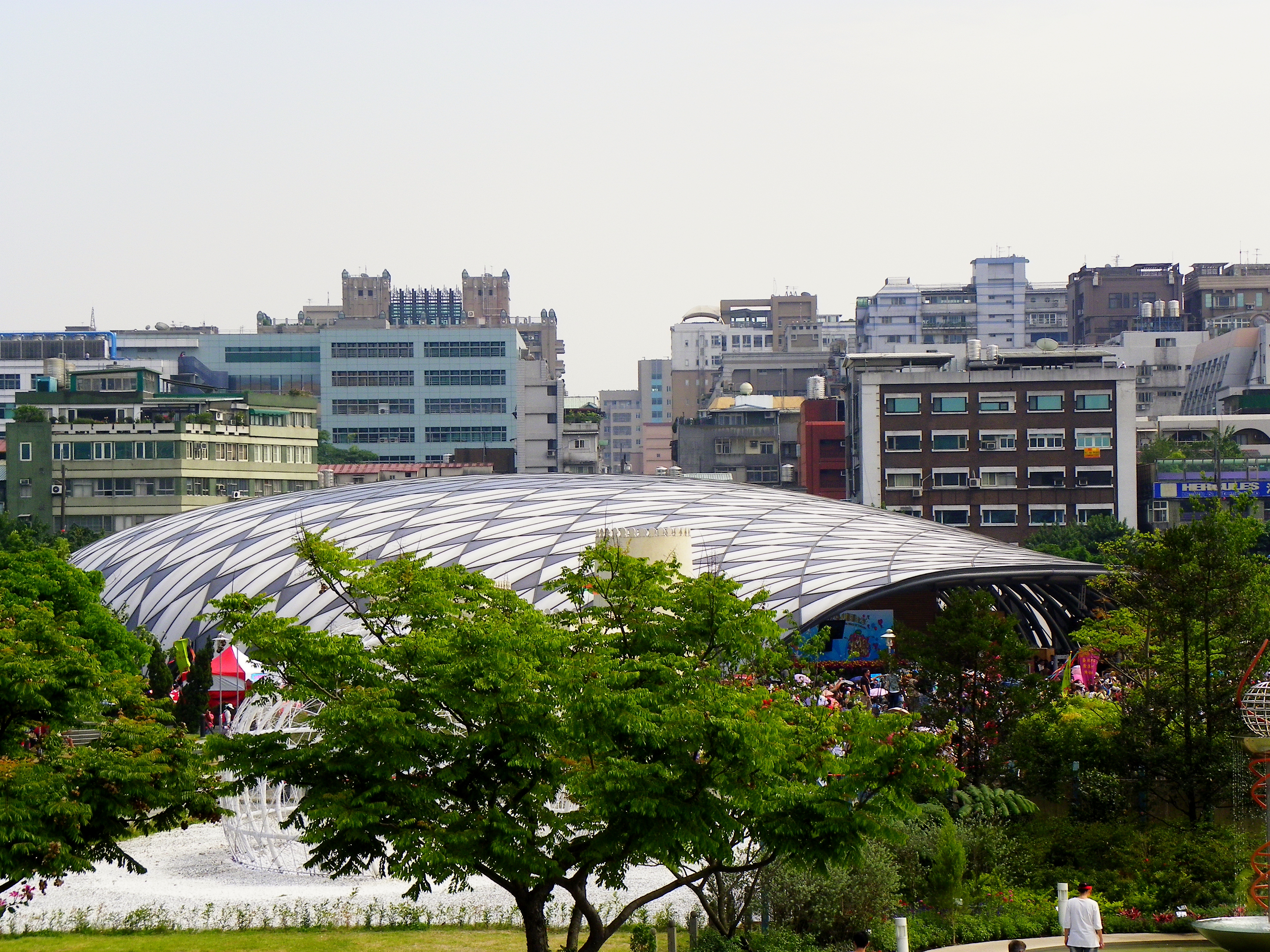
- 2010 Taipei International Flora Exposition hall
- Chinese: 臺北國際花卉博覽會
Transcriptions

The 2010 Taipei International Flora Exposition (2010 Flora Expo) opened on 6 November 2010 and ran until 25 April 2011 in Taipei, Taiwan. It was a garden festival recognized by the International Association of Horticultural Producers (AIPH / IAHP) and was categorized as an A2/B1 horticulture exposition. It was the first such internationally recognized exposition to take place in Taiwan, and the seventh of its kind to take place in Asia. It is located near Yuanshan Station. The area is now converted to Taipei Expo Park.

The expo was organized by the Taipei City Government in partnership with the Taiwan Floriculture Development Association (TFDA). The city was chosen to host the event in April 2006. It was held in the Yuanshan area in Taipei and sites among many of the cities artistic and cultural locations, including the Zhongshan Soccer Stadium, Taipei Children's Recreation Center, Taipei Fine Arts Museum, Taipei Story House, and the Lin-An-tai Historical Home. Unlike other suburban exhibitions held in Kunming, Hamanako, and Chiang Mai, the expo was held in the city center to emphasize the development of more urban green spaces. It showcased Taipei's achievements in tourism, catering, gardening, and biotechnology.

== Attendance ==
Although there had been worries about attendance at the expo, the Taipei mayor noted that with the steady increase in attendance since opening, he was no longer worried. On 15 December 2010, the Expo welcomed its 2 millionth visitor, and on 5 January 2011, it welcomed its 3 millionth visitor. By 5 February 2011, total visitors had reached 4.18 million, with a single day record of 91,676. The popularity of the festival has affected tourist numbers at other popular tourist locations in Taiwan. The expo passed 5 million visitors on 25 February 2011, and reached another single day record of 150,000 visitors on 27 February 2011. By the time the Expo closed on 25 April 2011, over 8.9 million visitors had entered the park, surpassing the original 8 million visitor target.

== Areas ==
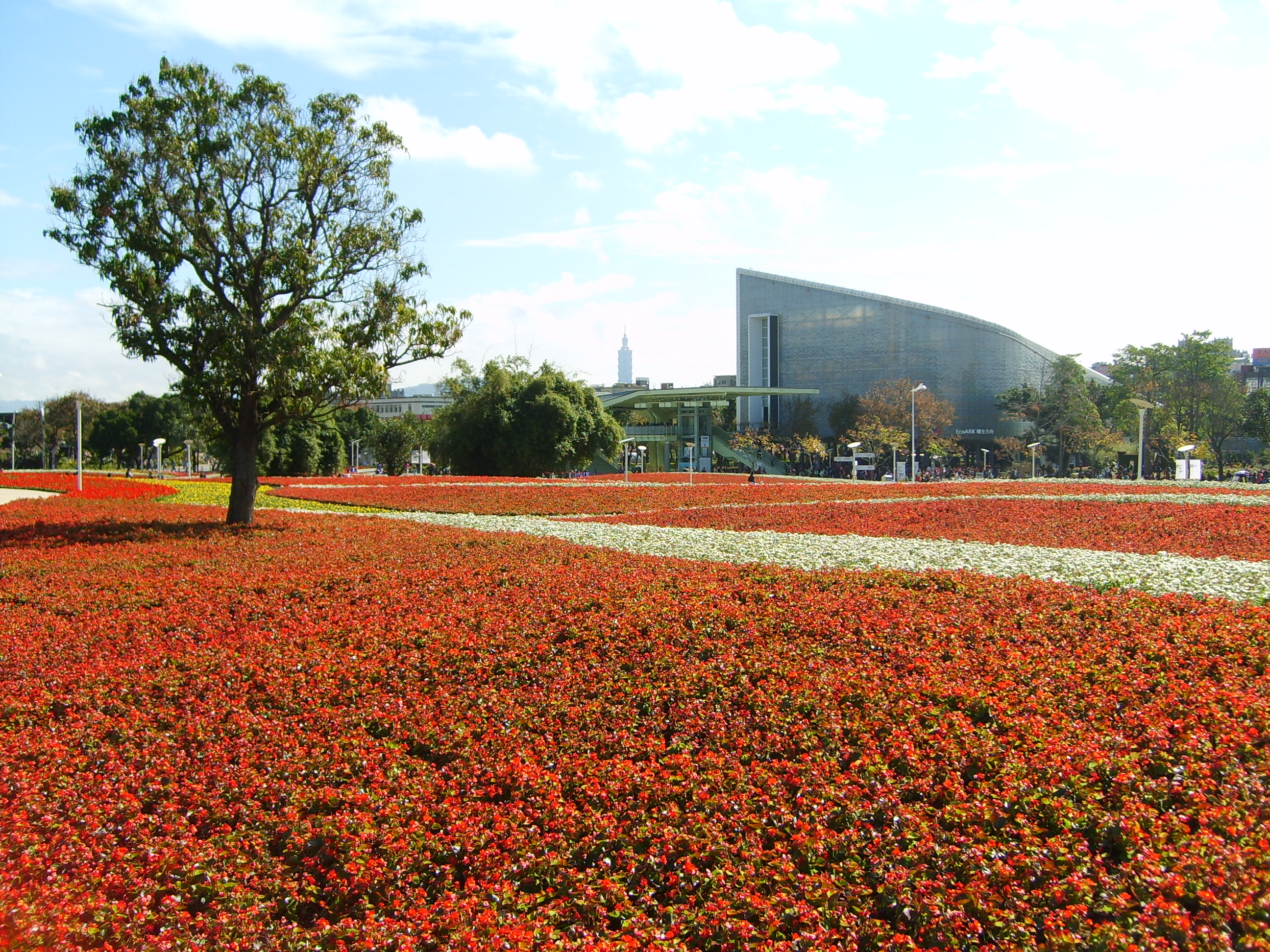
Sea of flowers in Taipei Flora Expo

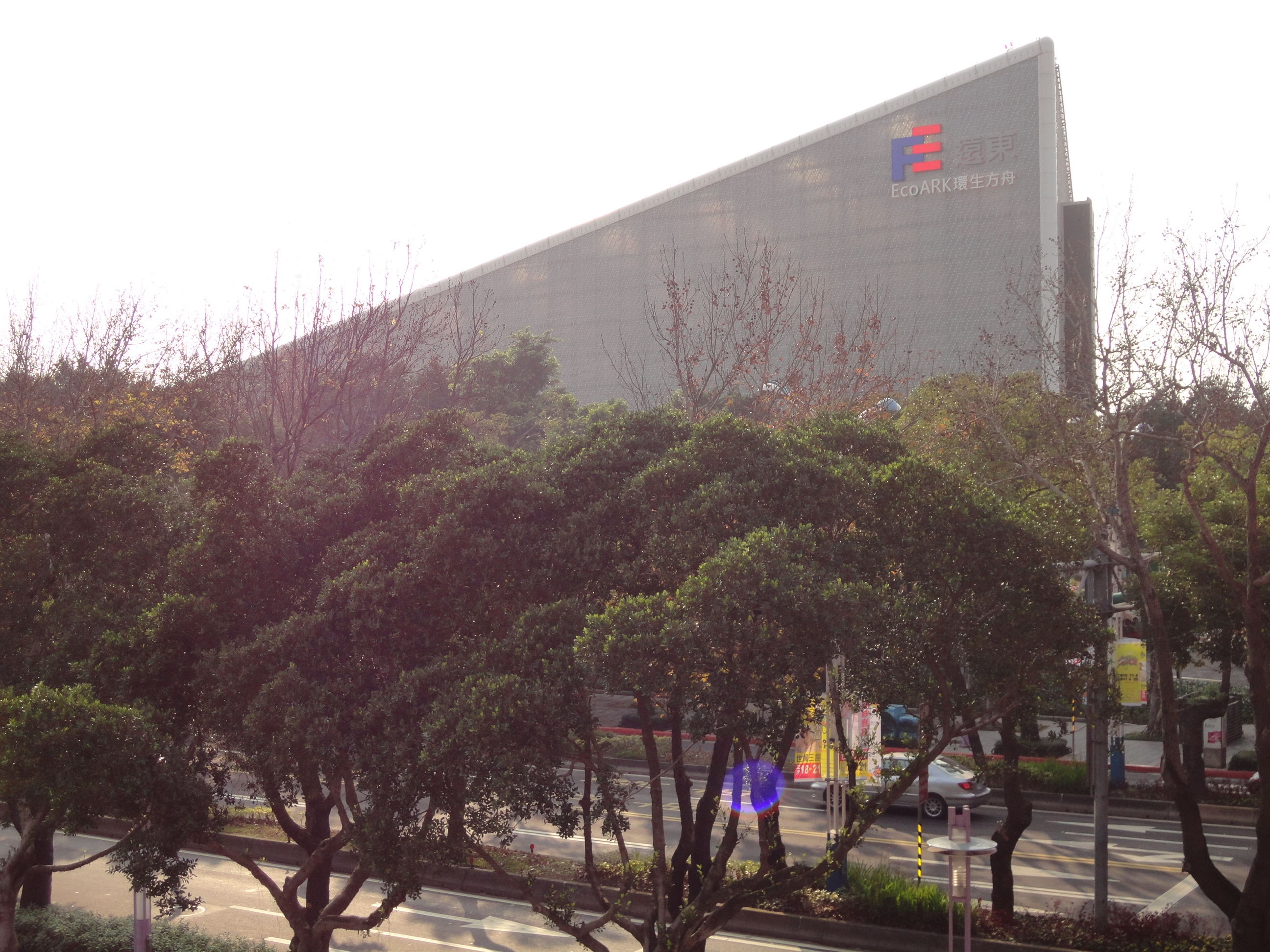
FE Ark

The expo was divided up between four major areas: Yuanshan Park, Taipei Artist Park, Xinsheng Park and Dajia Riverside Park. It has 14 pavilions and occupies an area of 91.8 hectares (0.918 km^{2}). Each area was also covered with many outdoor gardens, including a Global Garden Area (featuring exhibits from the United States, Greece, the Netherlands, Thailand, Bhutan, Hawaii, Belau, Hong Kong, Japan and more), a Fujian-Style Garden, and a Sea of Flowers. In addition, it features more than 800 varieties of orchids, 329 million locally developed plant varieties, and award-winning landscape and gardening designs from 22 countries. The expo was based on several major design concepts:

- To convey the essence of gardening, science, and environmental protection technology.
- To reach the goals of reduce, reuse, and recycle.
- To combine culture and art as parts of eco-friendly living.

Before Christmas, the park was decorated with 70,000 poinsettias of various colors to celebrate the holidays.

== Pavilions ==
Of the 14 pavilions in the expo, there are several of note:

Pavilion of Dreams

The building showcased Taiwan's cutting-edge technology in addition to flowers. A 3.5-ton artificial flower hangs from the ceiling, responding to beats in music. In an exhibition room, flat screens showcase 3D images of flowers without the need to use special glasses (using lenticular imaging). A wall of 3-meter-tall liquid crystal glass panels showed lifelike projections of flowers in the wild.

Pavilion of Fashion

Also known as EcoARK, the building was a three-story structure built using 1.5 million plastic bottles (instead of bricks) to emphasize sustainability and creativity.

Three pavilions, the "Pavilion of Dreams", "Pavilion of the Future", and "Pavilion of Angel Life", received the top prize at the 9th Taipei Urban Landscape Awards. Many of the expo specialties (including paper-thin speakers designed by ITRI, displayed at the Pavilion of Dreams) are commercially available as souvenirs.

== See also ==
- Taipei Expo Park
- Garden festival
- Floriculture in Taiwan
- Taichung World Flora Exposition
