= Floriculture in Taiwan =

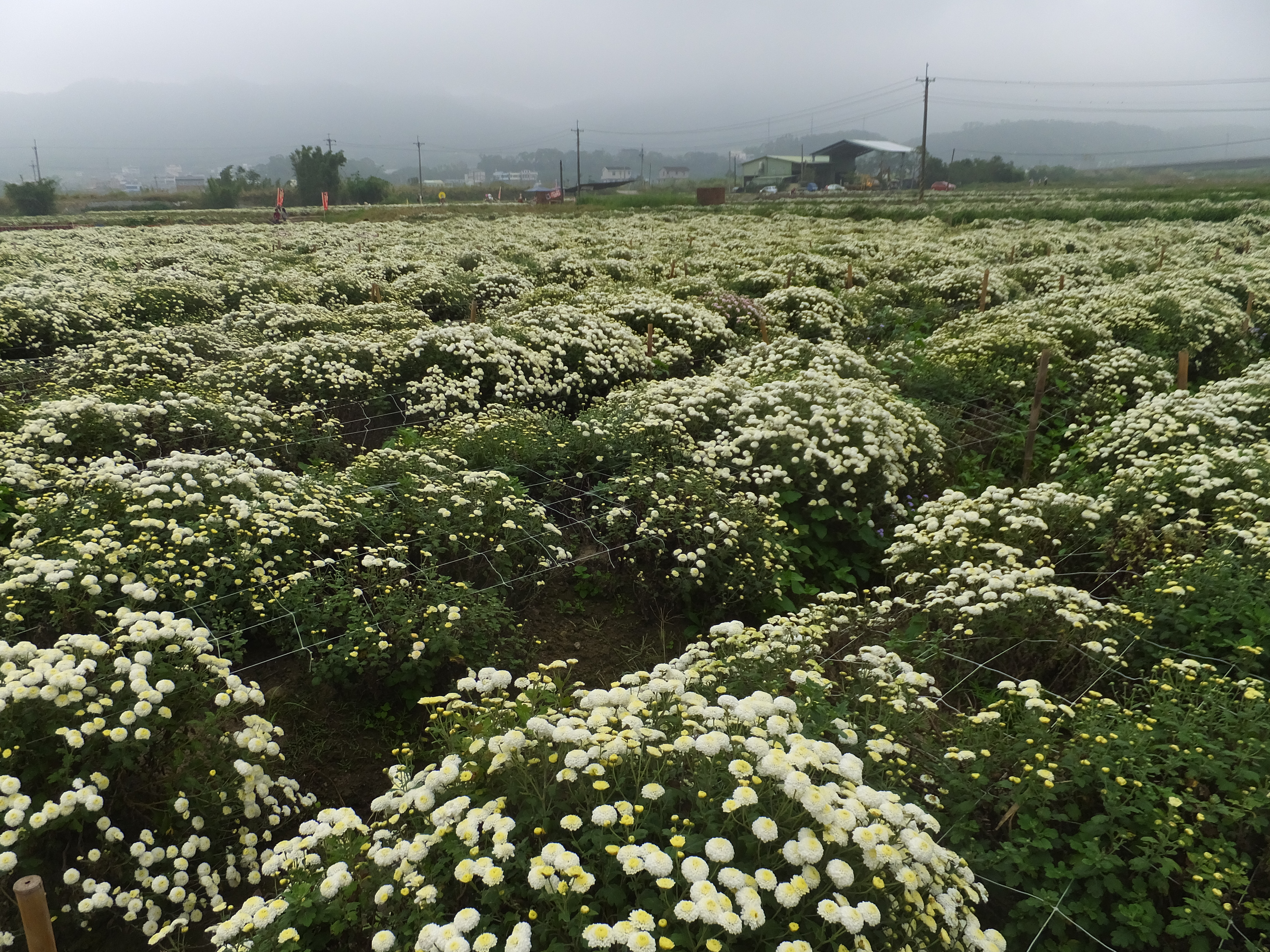
Jiuhu chrysanthemum fields

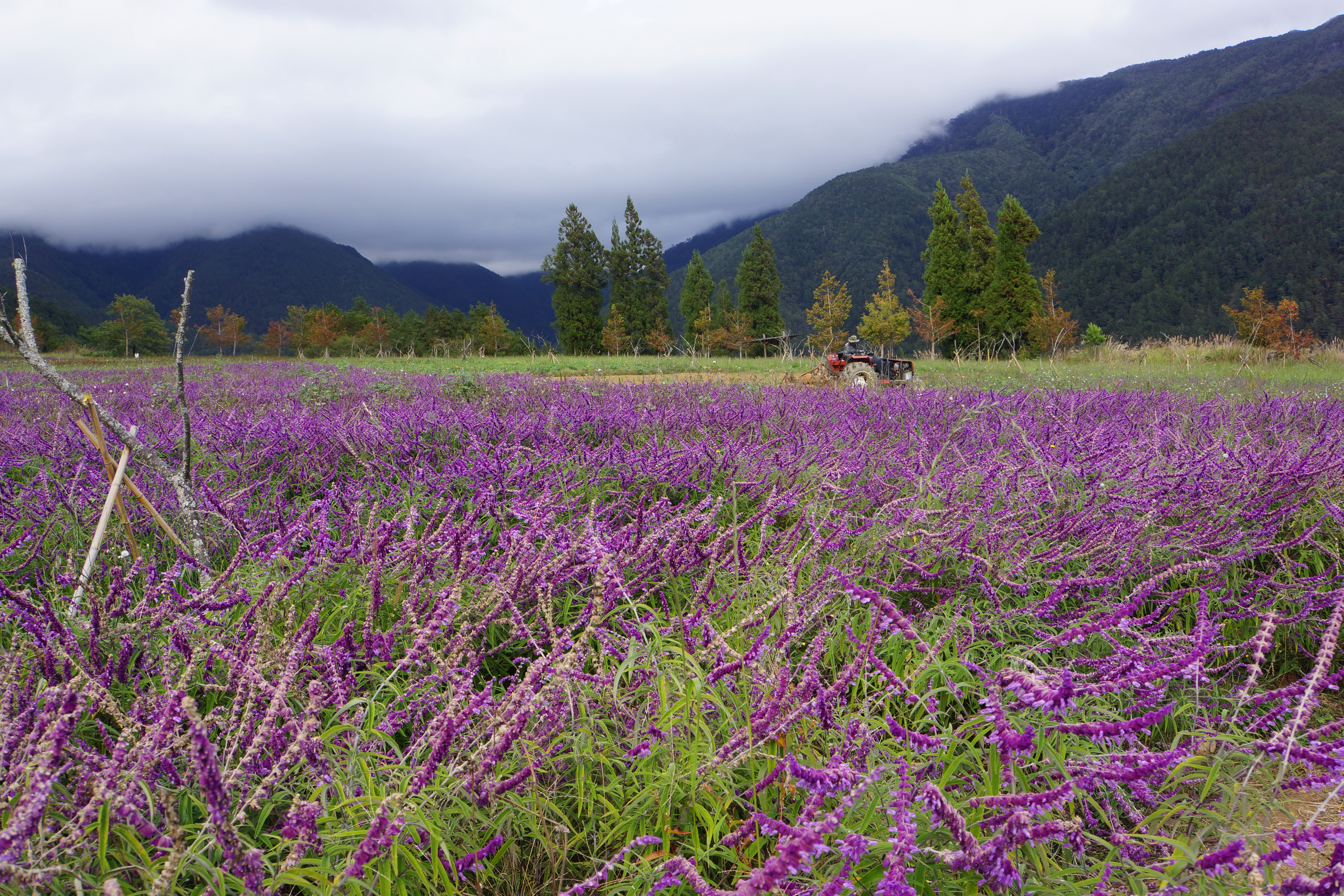
Flower field in wuling farm

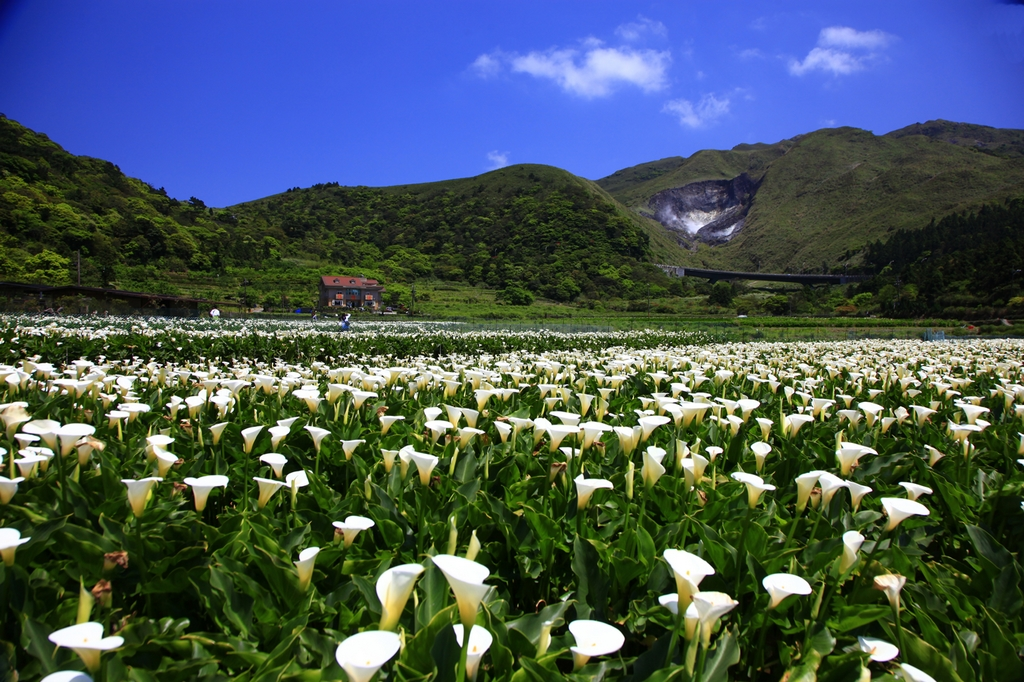
Calla lily field

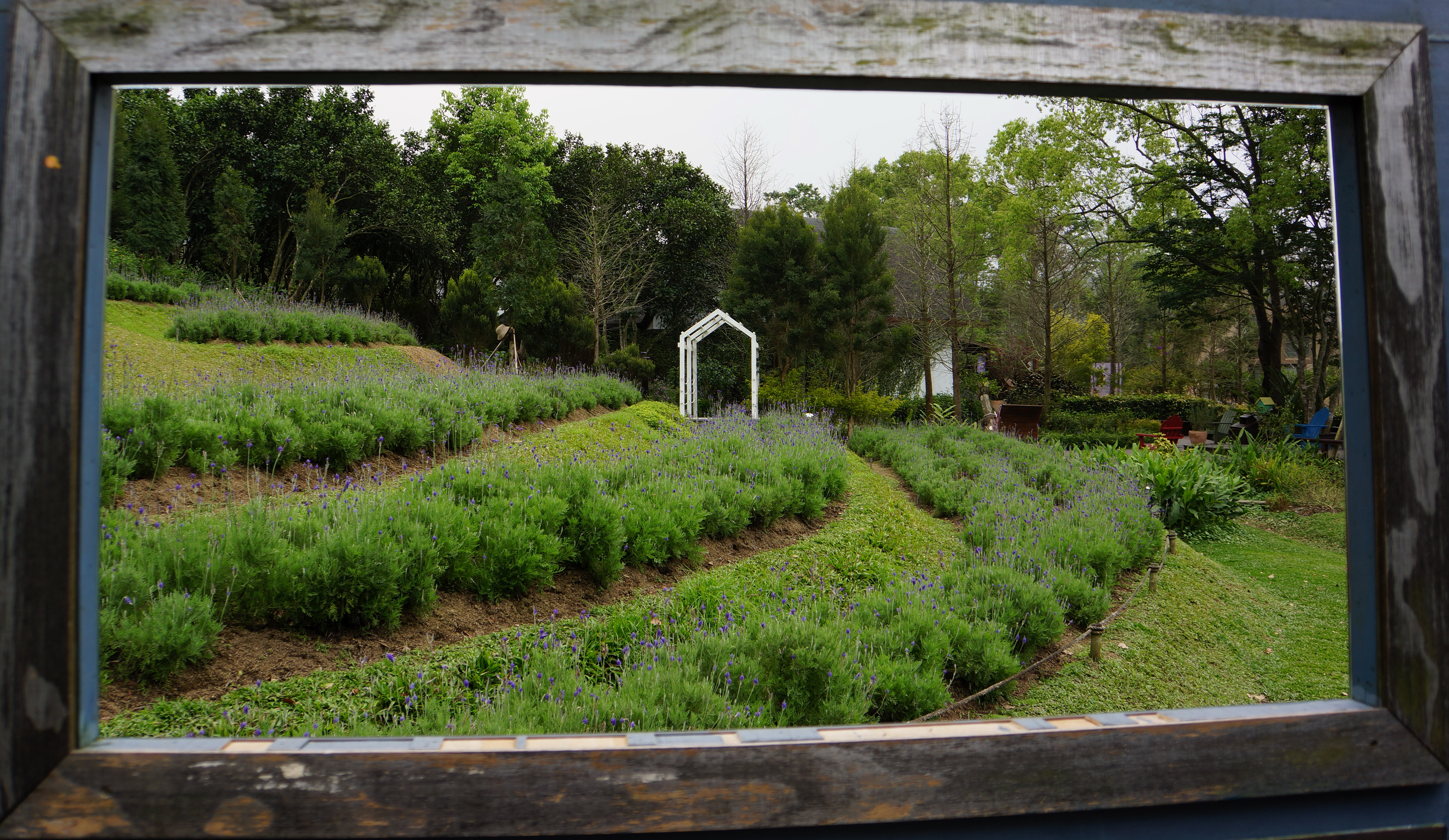
Lavender field

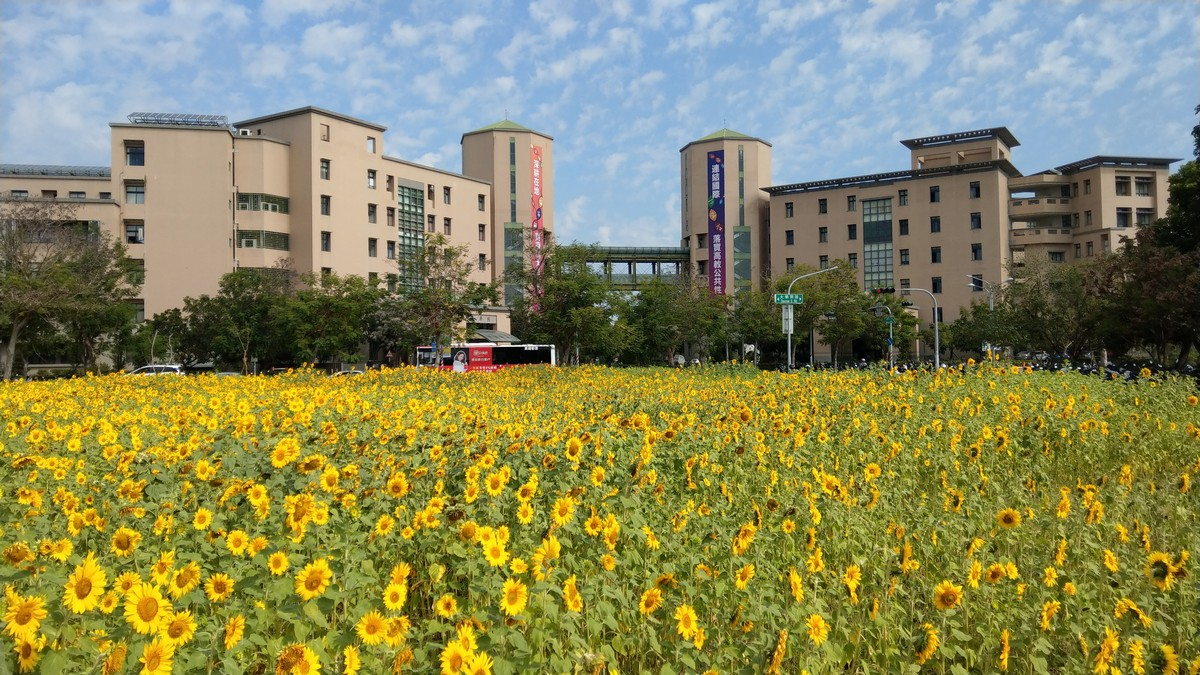
Sunflower field

Floriculture is a significant industry in Taiwan. Taiwan is one of the largest flower exporters in the world and the top producer of orchids.

== Overview ==
In 2011 Taiwan was one of the largest flower exporters in the world and the top producer of orchids.

In 2013, Taiwan harvested flowers with a total value of NT$16.52 billion, in which US$189.7 million of it was exported. Flower plantation land spreads over an area of 138 km2. Chrysanthemum floriculture takes the most land share among other types of flowers. Taiwan is the world's largest exporter of orchids, which represented 87% of the flower export value in 2013. The main export markets for Taiwanese flowers are the United States, Japan and the Netherlands.

Small scale growers receive extensive government and private support, many of these small flower growers are multi-generation family farms.

Tianwei is a traditional center of the industry and is known as the “land of flowers."

== History ==
The high-end orchid industry began in the 1970s with amateurs and hobbyists collecting and cultivating specimens. Due to the economic expansion of Taiwan’s economy during this period these hobbyists where able to devote significant resources to developing and crossbreeding orchids. This created a dedicated local market for very expensive innovative flowers. In the 1980s major Taiwanese corporations noticed the market and began mass production with the help of Dutch companies and cultivation techniques.

In the early 1990s Taiwanese flower producers played an important part in starting the modern floriculture industry in China, particularly around Kunming.

In 2005 Taiwan overtook Thailand as the world’s top orchid producer.

The export oriented flower market suffered during the COVID-19 pandemic with an increase in domestic consumption and government support necessary to keep the industry profitable.

In 2022 Taiwan was by far the largest exporter of orchids to the United States.

== Markets ==
The Taipei Flower Market is the largest plant and flower market in Taiwan.

== Organizations ==
The Taiwan Floriculture Development Association is the primary industry association. Associations also exist for high value sub-groups such as orchid producers.

== Events ==
=== Taipei International Flora Exposition ===
Taipei International Flora Exposition
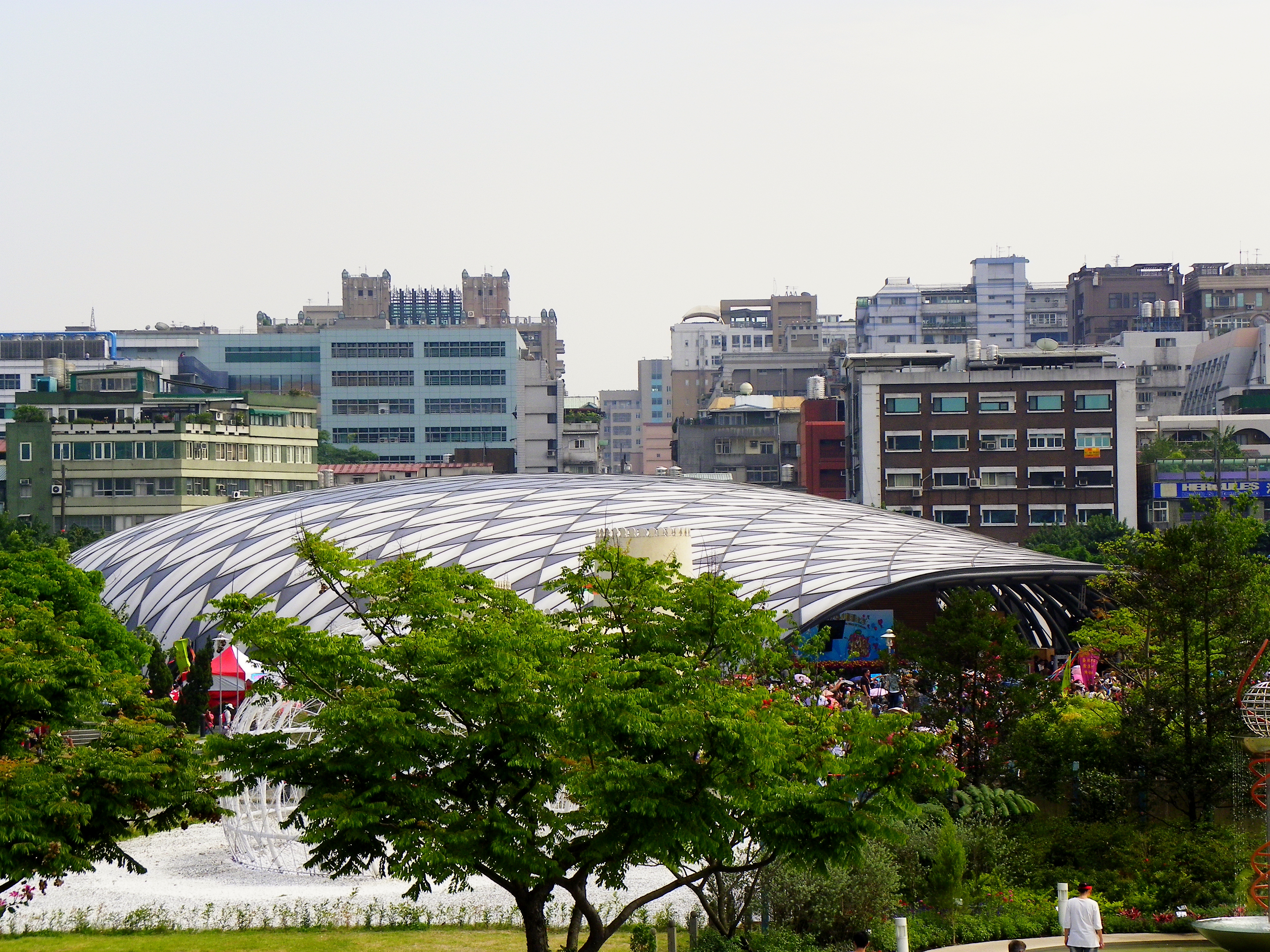
- 2010 Taipei International Flora Exposition hall
- Chinese: 臺北國際花卉博覽會
Transcriptions

The 2010 Taipei International Flora Exposition (2010 Flora Expo) opened on 6 November 2010 and ran until 25 April 2011 in Taipei, Taiwan. It was a garden festival recognized by the International Association of Horticultural Producers (AIPH / IAHP) and was categorized as an A2/B1 horticulture exposition. It was the first such internationally recognized exposition to take place in Taiwan, and the seventh of its kind to take place in Asia. It is located near Yuanshan Station. The area is now converted to Taipei Expo Park.

=== Taichung World Flora Exposition ===
The Taichung World Flora Exposition is an AIPH (category A2|B1) horticultural exposition held between 3 November 2018 and 24 April 2019 in Houli District, Taiwan. There were 33 participating countries.

== See also ==
- Taiwanese tea
- Banana production in Taiwan
