= Billiards at the 2017 Summer Universiade – Women's doubles 9-ball =

Billiards at the XXIX Summer Universiade
- Venue: Expo Dome, Taipei Expo Park
- Dates: August 28, 2017 – August 29, 2017
- Competitors: 8 from 4 nations

The women's 9-ball doubles event at the 2017 Summer Universiade was held on 28 and 29 August at the Expo Dome, Taipei Expo Park.

== Medallist ==
Gold	Silver	Bronze
Chinese Taipei (TPE) Kuo Szu-ting Wei Tzu-chen	South Korea (KOR) Jang Joon-hye Jeong Eun-su	Mongolia (MGL) Uyanga Battulga N. Bayarsaikhan

== Results ==
Semifinals
Kuo Szu-ting (TPE); Wei Tzu-chen (TPE)	9
Uyanga Battulga (MGL); N. Bayarsaikhan (MGL)	2
Jang Joon-hye (KOR); Jeong Eun-su (KOR)	9
Ong Rui Yi (SGP); Wong Li Ting Sarah (SGP)	8

Gold medal
Kuo Szu-ting (TPE); Wei Tzu-chen (TPE)	9
Jang Joon-hye (KOR); Jeong Eun-su (KOR)	3
Bronze medal
Uyanga Battulga (MGL); N. Bayasaikhan (MGL)	9
Ong Rui Yi (SGP); Wong Li Ting Sarah (SGP)	3
