= Billiards at the 2017 Summer Universiade – Women's singles 9-ball =

Billiards at the XXIX Summer Universiade
- Venue: Expo Dome, Taipei Expo Park
- Dates: August 25, 2017 – August 27, 2017
- Competitors: 9 from 5 nations

The women's 9-ball singles event at the 2017 Summer Universiade was held on 25 and 27 August at the Expo Dome, Taipei Expo Park.

== Medallist ==
Gold	Silver	Bronze
Ku Chen-chin Chinese Taipei	N. Bayarsaikhan Mongolia	Wu Zhi-ting Chinese Taipei

== Results ==
Round of 16
Wong Li Ting Sarah (SGP)
Bye
Wu Zhi-ting (TPE)
Bye
Jang Yoon-hye (KOR)
Bye
Bye
N. Bayasaikhan (MGL)
Jeong Eun-su (KOR)	2
Ku Cheng-chin (TPE)	9
Marusa Premru (SLO)
Bye
Uyanga Battulga (MGL)
Bye
Ong Rui Yi (SGP)
Bye

Quarterfinal
Wong Li Ting Sarah (SGP)	1
Wu Zhi-ting (TPE)	9
Jang Yoon-hye (KOR)	3
N. Bayarsaikhan (MGL)	9
Ku Cheng-chin (TPE)	9
Marusa Premru (SLO)	4
Uyanga Battulga (MGL)	9
Ong Rui Yi (SGP)	6

Semifinal
Wu Zhi-ting (TPE)	6
N. Bayasaikhan (MGL)	9
Ku Cheng-chin (TPE)	9
Uyanga Battulga (MGL)	2

Final
N. Bayasaikhan (MGL)	6
Ku Cheng-chin (TPE)	9

=== Bronze Medal ===
Bronze Medal
Wu Zhi-ting (TPE)	9
Uyanga Battulga (MGL)	1
