= Billiards at the 2017 Summer Universiade – Men's singles 9-ball =

Billiards at the XXIX Summer Universiade
- Venue: Expo Dome, Taipei Expo Park
- Dates: August 25, 2017 – August 27, 2017
- Competitors: 16 from 8 nations

The men's 9-ball singles event at the 2017 Summer Universiade was held on 25 and 27 August at the Expo Dome, Taipei Expo Park.

== Medallist ==
Gold	Silver	Bronze
Hsu Jui-an Chinese Taipei	Liu Cheng-chieh Chinese Taipei	Eirik Siisnaes Norway

== Results ==
Round of 16
Baasandorj Odsuren (MGL)	11
Lim James (PHI)	9
Huang Benjamin Ho Chi (SGP)	7
Kengo Suzuki (JPN)	11
Klemen Gradiisnik (SLO)	11
Hang Sang-woo (KOR)	2
Matias Sartre (NOR)	9
Liu Cheng-chieh (TPE)	11
Tim Koprivnik (SLO)	2
Hsu Jui-an (TPE)	11
Leong Junjie, Benedic (SGP)	4
Kwon Ho-jin (KOR)	11
M. Soronzonbold (MGL)	10
Rodlin John Bautista (PHI)	11
Takayuki Shishido (JPN)	4
Eirik Riisnaes (NOR)	11

Quarterfinal
Baasandorj Odsuren (MGL)	6
Kengo Suzuki (JPN)	11
Klemen Gradisnik (SLO)	4
Liu Cheng-chieh (TPE)	11
Hsu Jui-an (TPE)	11
Kwon Ho-jin (KOR)	10
Rodlin John Bautista (PHI)	7
Eirik Riisnaes (NOR)	11

Semifinal
Kengo Suzuki (JPN)	3
Liu Cheng-chieh (TPE)	11
Hsu Jui-an (TPE)	11
Eiril Riisnaes (NOR)	9

Final
Liu Cheng-chieh (TPE)	3
Hsu Jui-an (TPE)	11

=== Bronze Medal ===
Bronze Medal
Kengo Suzuki (JPN)	2
Eirik Riisnaes (NOR)	11
