= Banana production in Taiwan =

Agriculture produce in Taiwan

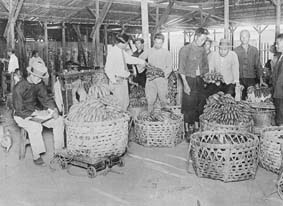
Banana market in 1932 in Taichū Prefecture

Banana production in Taiwan is an essential aspect of the agriculture of Taiwan. Japanese consumers commonly purchase bananas grown in Taiwan.

== History ==
The banana production begin to grow when Taiwan was being occupied by Japan. By 1939, Taiwan was the third largest exporter of bananas in the world. Taiwan bananas monopolized the Japanese market until 1963, when banana importation was liberalized in Japan. In 1967, banana exports from the country were relatively high. Since 1970, the industry has declined significantly due to competition from the Philippines and problems with the cultivation.

== Agricultural land ==
Around 8,000 hectares of land in Taiwan is used for banana cultivation. About 5,000 hectares in Southern Taiwan is used for exported fruit, and about 3,000 hectares in Northern Taiwan is used for domestic consumption.

In 1991, the geographic distribution for banana cultivation land was Kaohsiung County (2,284 hectares), Changhua County, Nantou County, Taichung County (1,862 hectares), Pingtung County (1,254 hectares), Chiayi County, Tainan County, Yunlin County (185 hectares) and Hualien County, Taitung County (108 hectares).

== Economy ==
The main export destination of banana from Taiwan is Japan, which peaked in 1967 with 416,000 tons of export. In 1990, the export tonnage declined to 48,000 tons.

=== Research centers ===
The Taiwan Banana Research Institute is tasked to undergo research and development of banana cultivation in Taiwan.

== See also ==
- Agriculture in Taiwan
- Banana industry
- Floriculture in Taiwan
