= Chen Chung-wu =

Taiwanese legal scholar

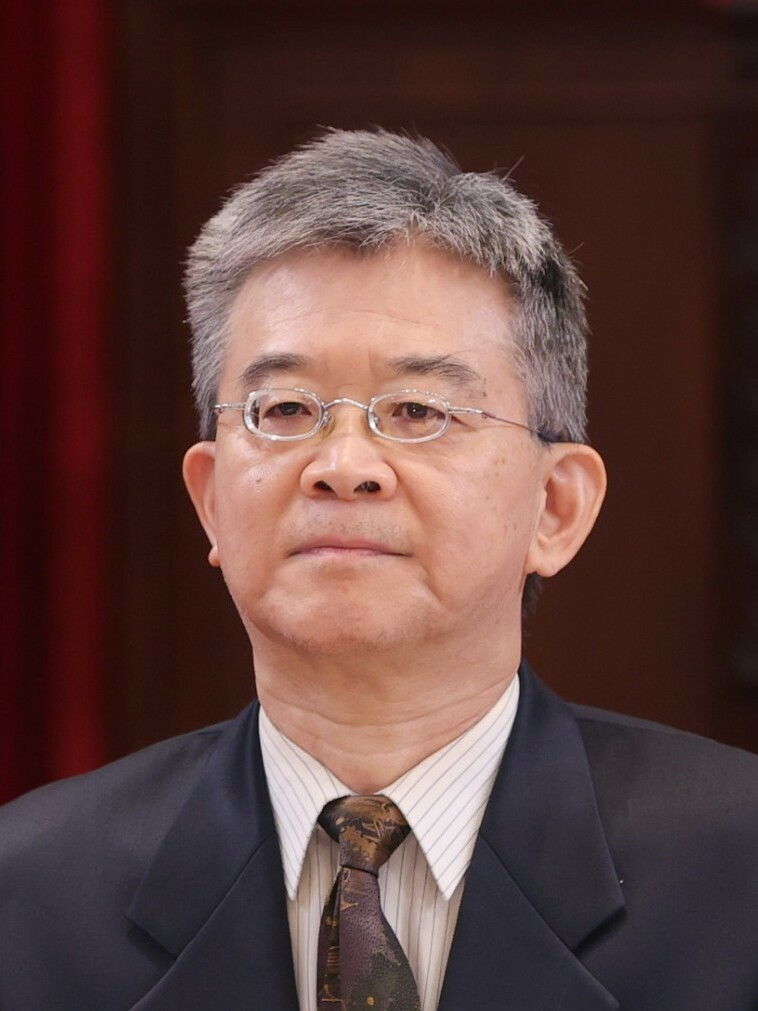
Chen in May 2023

Chen Chung-wu (Chinese: 陳忠五) is a Taiwanese legal scholar.

== Life ==
Chen was raised in Tianwei, Changhua County. He earned a bachelor's and master's degree in law at National Taiwan University, then practiced law in Taiwan, specializing in the pursuit of counterfeiters, before completing a Doctor of Law at Paris 1 Panthéon-Sorbonne University. Chen returned to Taiwan and joined the NTU faculty in 1997, then in 2011 was appointed to a distinguished professorship.

In May 2023, President Tsai Ing-wen nominated Chen to the Constitutional Court. His nomination was approved in a special session of the Legislative Yuan, despite a Kuomintang boycott of the proceedings.
