= Taichung World Flora Exposition 2018 =

Taichung World Flora Exposition
- Logo of Taichung World Flora Expo

Overview
- BIE-class: Unrecognized exposition
- Name: Taichung World Flora Exposition
- Mascot: Leopard cat family and Horsiver

Participant(s)
- Countries: 33

Location
- Country: Taiwan
- City: Taichung
- Venue: Fengyuan, Houli and Waipu districts

Timeline
- Opening: 3 November 2018
- Closure: 24 April 2019

The Taichung World Flora Exposition is an AIPH (category A2|B1) (Note: A horticultural exhibition with international participation lasting between 3 and 6 months and at least 25 Hectares in size) horticultural exposition held between 3 November 2018 and 24 April 2019 in Houli District, Taiwan. There were 33 participating countries.

== Theme and locations ==
The festival had three themes and three locations. Green held at Waipu Park Area, Nature at Houli Horse Ranch and People at Fengyuan's Ruanpizai Creek.

After the expo the Waipu park Area will be transformed into an international agriculture centre, and will host the 2020 World Orchid Conference.

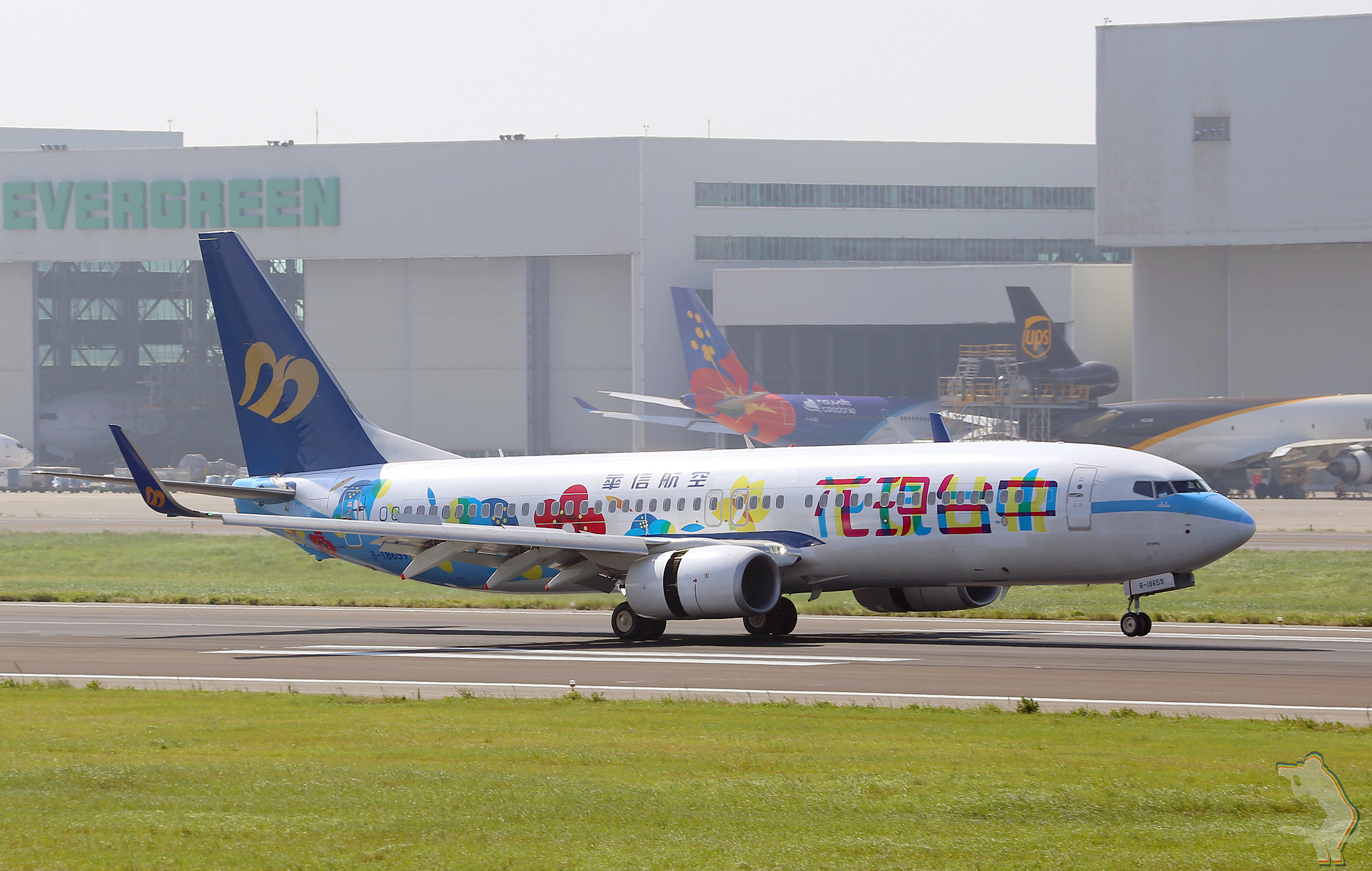
Boeing 737 with expo livery

== Participating countries ==
In addition to the hosts Taiwan, the following countries participated: Bhutan, Canada, Chile, China Hong Kong, France, Germany, Japan, Kazakhstan, Korea, Madagascar, Malaysia, Mongolia, Myanmar, Nepal, the Netherlands, Oman, Pakistan, Singapore, Somalia, Turkey, UK and USA. With the Marshall Islands, Palau and the Solomon Islands banding together to present the Asia-Pacific Diplomatic Joint Garden.

== Pavilions ==
The Myanmar pavilion was designed by Levi Sap Nei Thang. She used her logo ”I Love Myanmar” a heart-shaped in the national flag of Myanmar. Myanmar participated in both indoor flower show and world garden.

The Netherlands pavilion was designed by MAYU architects.

The tallest bamboo building in Taiwan was designed by ZUO studio and used as the Bamboo pavilion, and was made of Taiwan native bamboo species (including Moso and Makino Bamboo).

== Mascots ==
The fair's mascots were a family of anthropomorphised leopard cats and their bee-keeping horse neighbour called Horsiver.

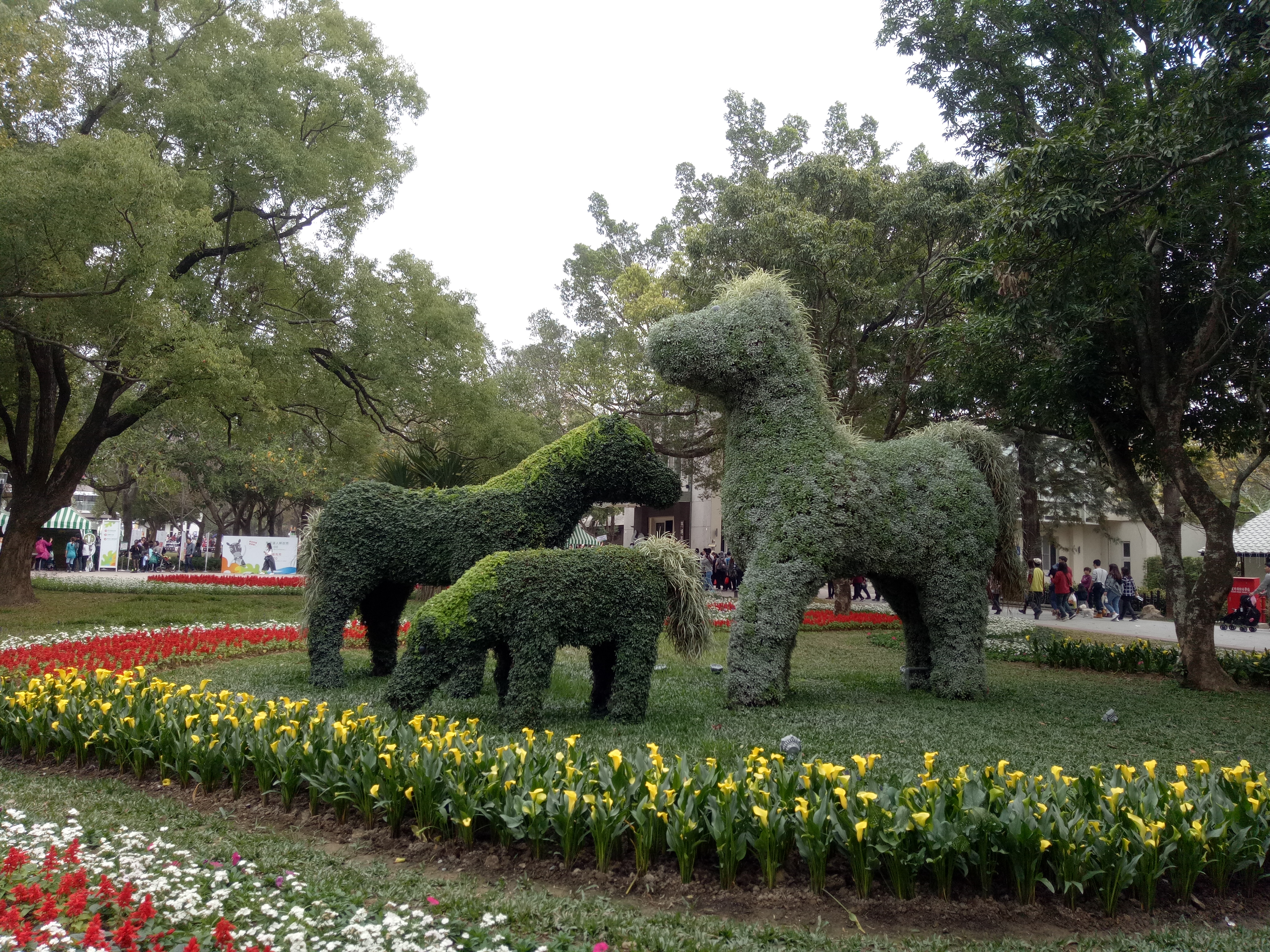
Topiary horses at Houli Horse Ranch

== See also ==
- Floriculture in Taiwan
- Taipei International Flora Exposition
