= Taipei Fine Arts Museum =

Art museum in Taipei

- 臺北市立美術館

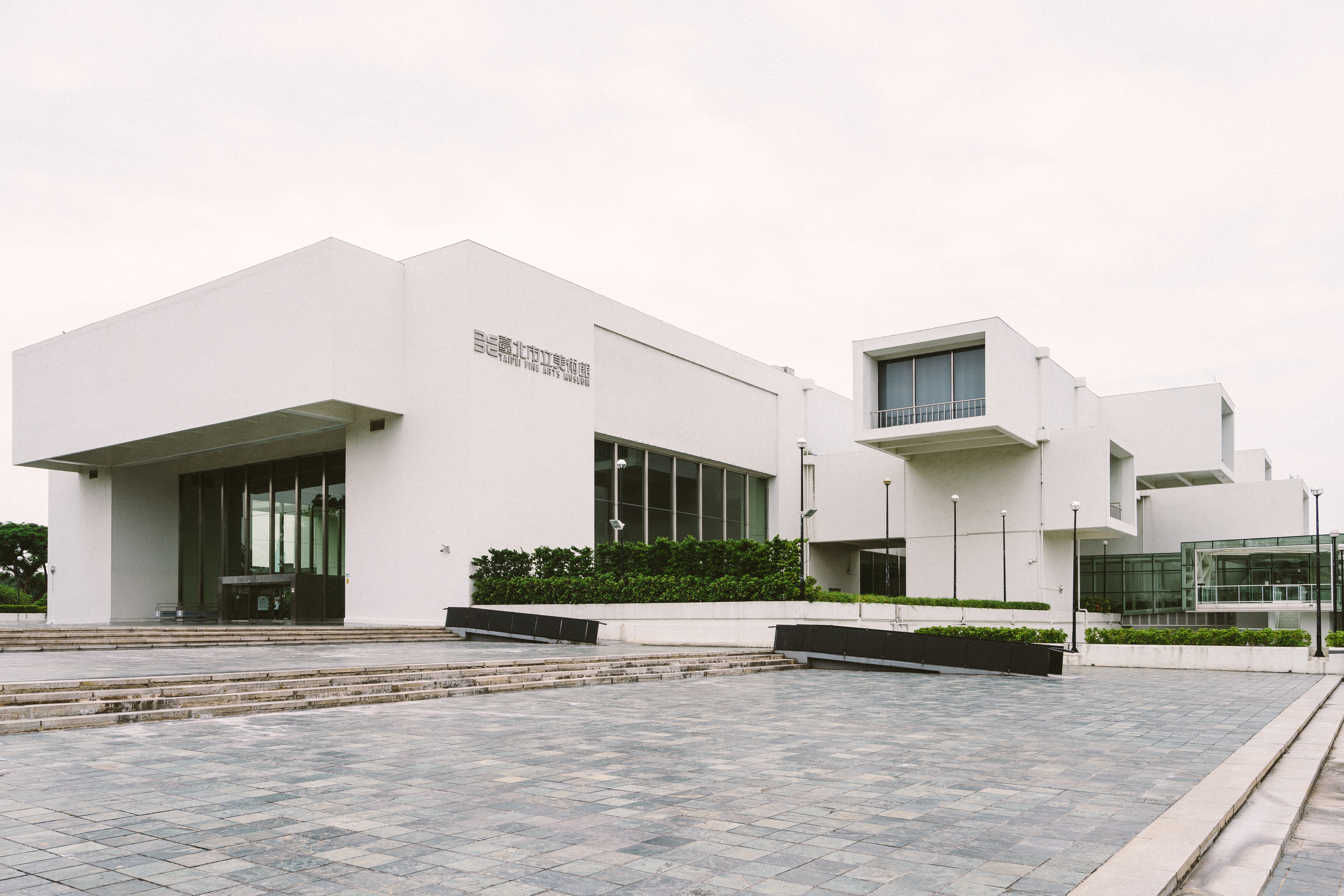
- Established: 8 August 1983
- Location: Zhongshan, Taipei, Taiwan Province, Republic of China
- Coordinates: 25°04′21″N 121°31′29″E
- Visitors: 628,133 (2015)
- Director: Loh Li-chen
- Architect: Kao Erh-pan
- Website: www.tfam.museum

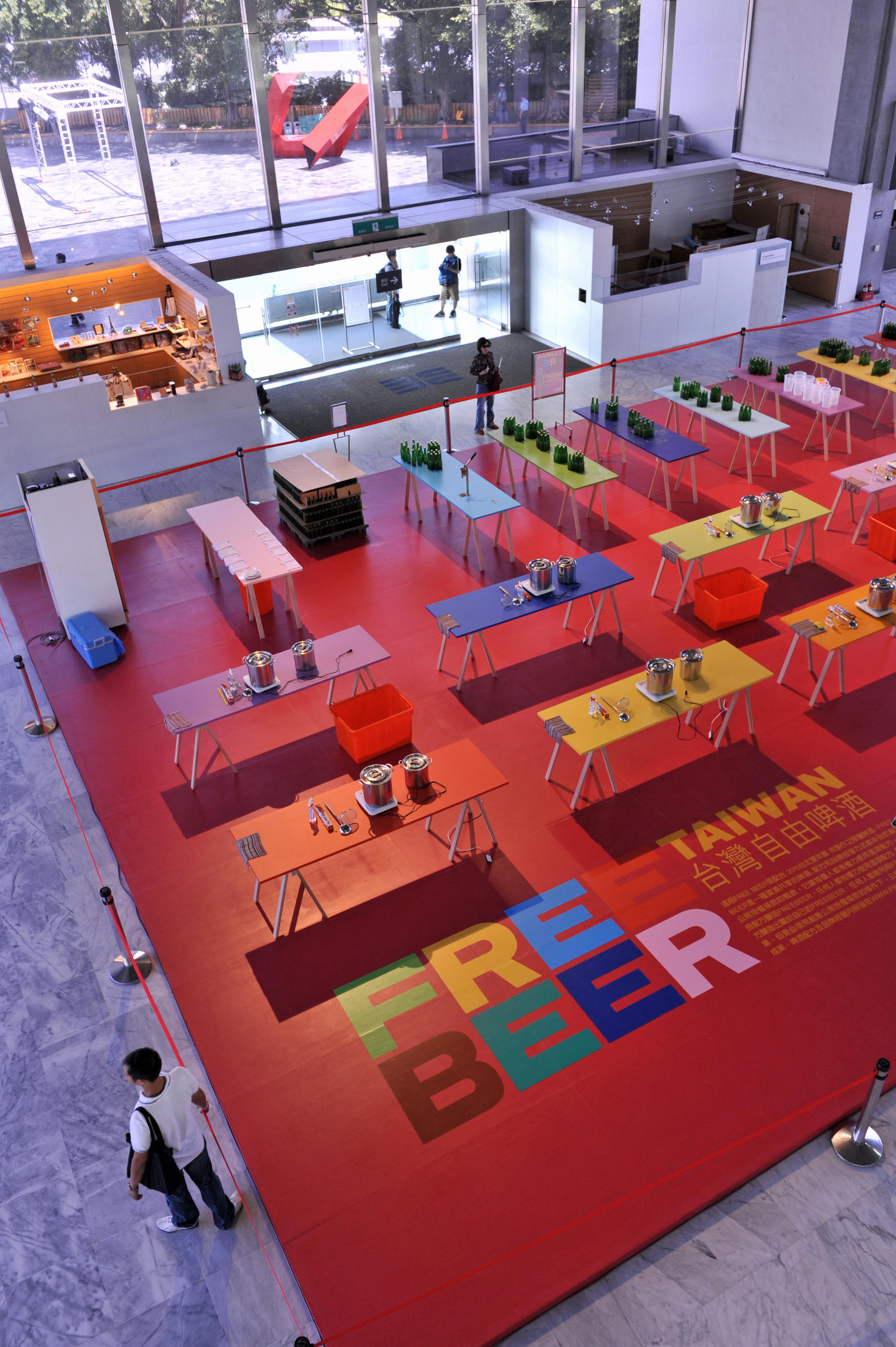
Taipei Biennial 2010: Superflex Workshop "Free Beer Factory" event

The Taipei Fine Arts Museum (TFAM; traditional Chinese: 臺北市立美術館; simplified Chinese: 台北市立美术馆; pinyin: Táiběi Shìlì Měishùguǎn) is a museum in Zhongshan District, Taipei, Taiwan. It is in the Taipei Expo Park. The museum first opened on August 8, 1983, at the former site of the United States Taiwan Defense Command. It was the first museum in Taiwan built for contemporary art exhibitions. The architecture is a local interpretation of the Japanese Metabolist Movement, and the building was designed by architect Kao Er-Pan.

== History ==
In 1976, following the central government's decision enhance the cultural life of city, the Taipei Municipal Government embarked on a plan to build a high-standard museum. From 1984 until 1990, the Taipei Fine Arts Museum's most prestigious event was the "Trends of Modern Art in the R.O.C.". This was a biennial exhibition which promoted Chinese modernity in art and mostly invited artists with a R.O.C. passport or equivalent ancestry. This national, competition style, exhibition was replaced in 1992 by the Taipei Biennial and the Taipei Prize. The Taipei Biennial had curators or critics invite an artist to exhibit, while the Taipei Prize continued to serve as a competition style event aimed at discovering young or unknown artists.

Since its opening, TFAM's mission has been to promote both Chinese modern art and international exchange. Since its early years it has hosted numerous international exhibitions, often sponsored by foreign cultural institutions such as the British Institute or the Goethe Institute. In 1989 it sent its first exhibition abroad. It was held in Japan and was entitled "Message from Taipei". One of the most prominent of these national exhibitions abroad was held in 1996/1997 in Aachen at the Museum Ludwig and in Berlin at the Haus der Kulturen der Welt as "Taiwan: Kunst Heute".

Since the mid-1990s, the TFAM's mission changed to promoting a Taiwanese identity in contemporary art, most visibly by organizing a national Taiwanese Pavilion at the Venice Biennial, and by dedicating the Taipei Biennial to the question of Taiwanese identity. In 1996 the largest ever Taipei Biennial was held under the title "The Quest for Identity", involving 110 artists and all floors of the building.

Since 1995 the TFAM has organized the Taiwan Pavilion at the Venice Biennale, which from 1995 until 2000 was recognized as a national pavilion. Starting in 1997 China exerted diplomatic pressure against the use of the name "Republic of China", and by 2001 the TFAM's Taiwan Pavilion in Venice was relegated to the list of institutional participations, and later to the category of collateral events. Since 2000, the Taichung National Museum of Arts organizes a participation at Venice's architecture biennial. While the TFAM had been happy to represent "Taiwan", the Taichung National Museum of Art insisted on the use of the name "R.O.C.", which became the diplomatic deathknell to a national pavilion. The loss of an official national representation has inspired other museums in Taiwan to organize exhibitions at the Venice Biennale as well, such as the Kaohsiung Museum of Fine Arts in 2007, and MoCA Taipei in 2009.

Since 1998 the Taipei Biennial has become an international event, curated by an international star curator. The first experiment in Asian internationalization was led by Fumio Nanjo under the title Site of Desire in 1998. Since 2000 the international curator is invited to choose a local co- curator, who then selects five to six local artists to participate at Taiwan's most prestigious art event. After 2000, funding and institutional backing for the Taipei Biennial have been dwindling, both compared to other Asian Biennials as well as privately backed exhibitions at the TFAM, regularly inciting criticism from the local art scene. The 13th Taipei Biennial, Small World, curated by Freya Chou, Reem Shadid and Brian Kuan Wood, opened in November 2023 and drew nearly 200,000 visitors.

The TFAM has a rather interesting institutional history of interaction with the local art scene. In 1986 the first director, Su Rui-ping, had to step down after she had eliminated the installation of artist Zhang Jianfu from an "experimental" exhibition with her own feet, and in 1985 had a red metal sculpture called "Unlimited Minimalism" of Li Zai-qian repainted in silver. As a form of late justice, in 2006 a red sculpture called "Homerun" was permanently installed on the plaza facing the main entrance. In 1988 performance artist Lee Ming-Sheng was beaten up by museum guards when he brought a glass of his feces to a public discussion during the "World of Dada" exhibition, which also featured Duchamp's famous urinal. In 1993 Lee became the first Taiwanese artist to be invited to the Venice Biennale. In 1995 newly appointed director Chang Chen-yu was forced to step down after months of protests of the art scene against his style of leadership and his use of museum funds. With the turn of the millennium and the growing professionalization of the art scene, this close-quarter relationship between the museum and the local art scene has considerably changed: at the 2004 Taipei Biennial, the statement of the local curator was eliminated from the official catalogue, without creating any major repercussions.

In 2001, the Museum of Contemporary Art Taipei was established in the Taipei City Government old building.

== Transportation ==
The museum is within walking distance of the Taipei Metro's Yuanshan Station.

== See also ==
- List of museums in Taiwan
- National Taiwan Museum
- MoCA Taipei
- Taipei Story House, adjacent to TFAM
- List of largest art museums
