= Taipei Story House =

- 台北故事館 / 圓山別莊
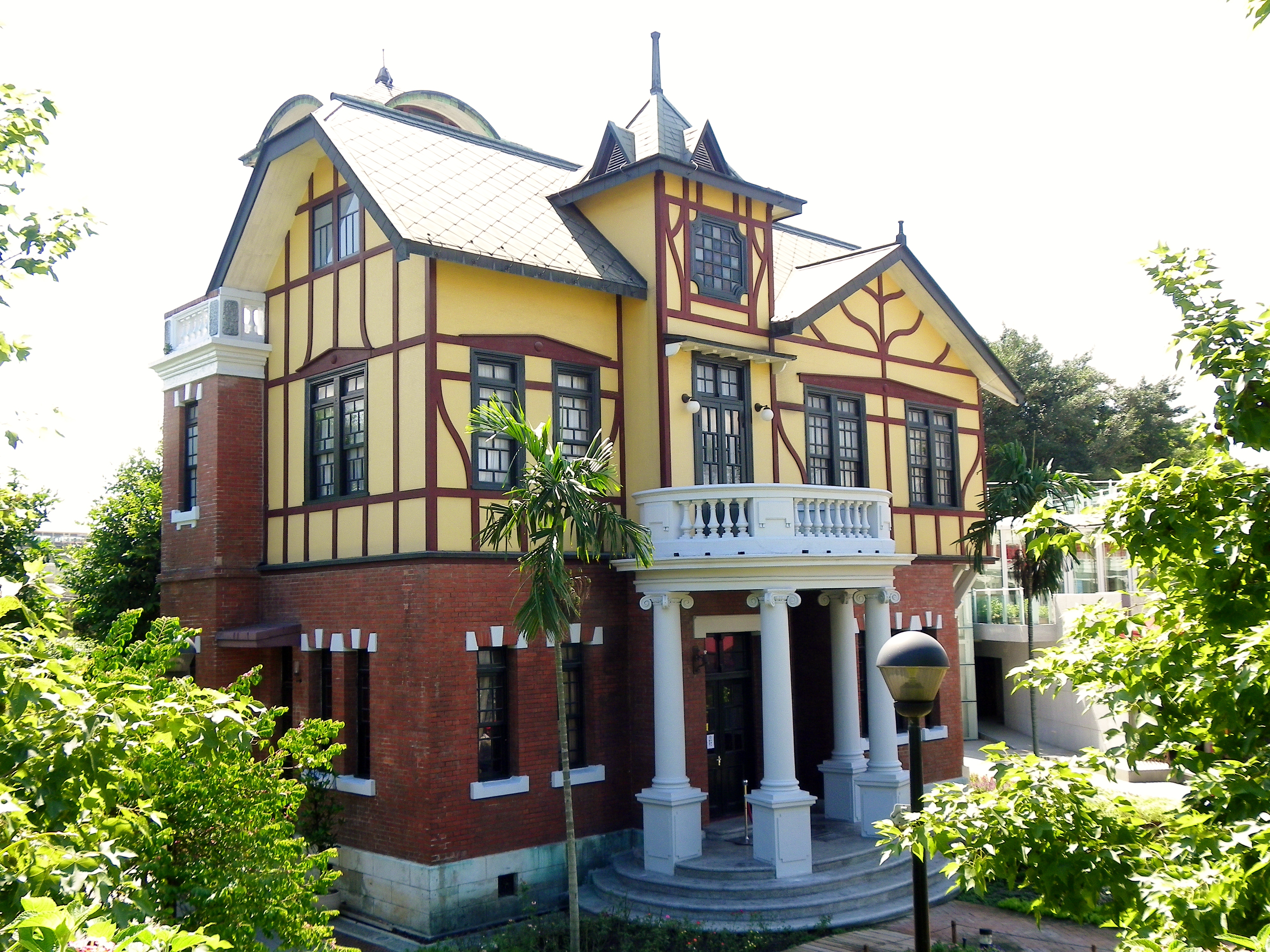
- Established: 1913-1914
- Location: Zhongshan, Taipei, Taiwan
- Coordinates: 25°04′24″N 121°31′28″E
- Type: Museum
- Curator: Chen Guo-ci (陳國慈)
- Public transit access: Yuanshan Station
- Website: www.storyhouse.com.tw

The Taipei Story House (Chinese: 台北故事館; pinyin: Táiběi Gùshì Guǎn), formerly known as the Yuanshan Mansion (Chinese: 圓山別莊; Pe̍h-ōe-jī: Îⁿ-soaⁿ Pia̍t-chong), is a historic house in Zhongshan District, Taipei, Taiwan. It is currently open as a museum in the Taipei Expo Park.

== Overview ==
The house was built in 1913–14 during Japanese rule by Tan Tiau-chun (陳朝駿), a Daitōtei tea merchant. It was originally a guest house for local dignitaries and overseas guests.

The ground floor was built using brick and the upper floors of wood with English Tudor-style beams. The staircase is constructed to look like a pagoda. The gable above the entrance features stained glass in green, yellow and red. Two fireplaces can be found inside, with large numbers of Art Nouveau tiles and ceiling lamps with bas-relief floral patterns.

The Story House museum now has exhibits related to tea and local history. It is located adjacent to the Taipei Fine Arts Museum and close to Yuanshan Station.

== Transportation ==
The building is within walking north-east from the Yuanshan Station of the Taipei Metro.

== Fares ==
There is a NT$50 fare for each person. Those under 6 or over 65 can enter free.

== Opening Hours ==
The museum is open from 10:30 AM to 6:30 PM, from Tuesday to Saturday.

== See also ==
- List of tourist attractions in Taiwan
- Taipei Futai Street Mansion
- Monopoly Bureau
