= Tianwei, Changhua =

Rural township in Changhua County, Taiwan

Coordinates: 23°54′08.4″N 120°31′17.1″E

Tianwei Township 田尾鄉 Tao
- Rural township
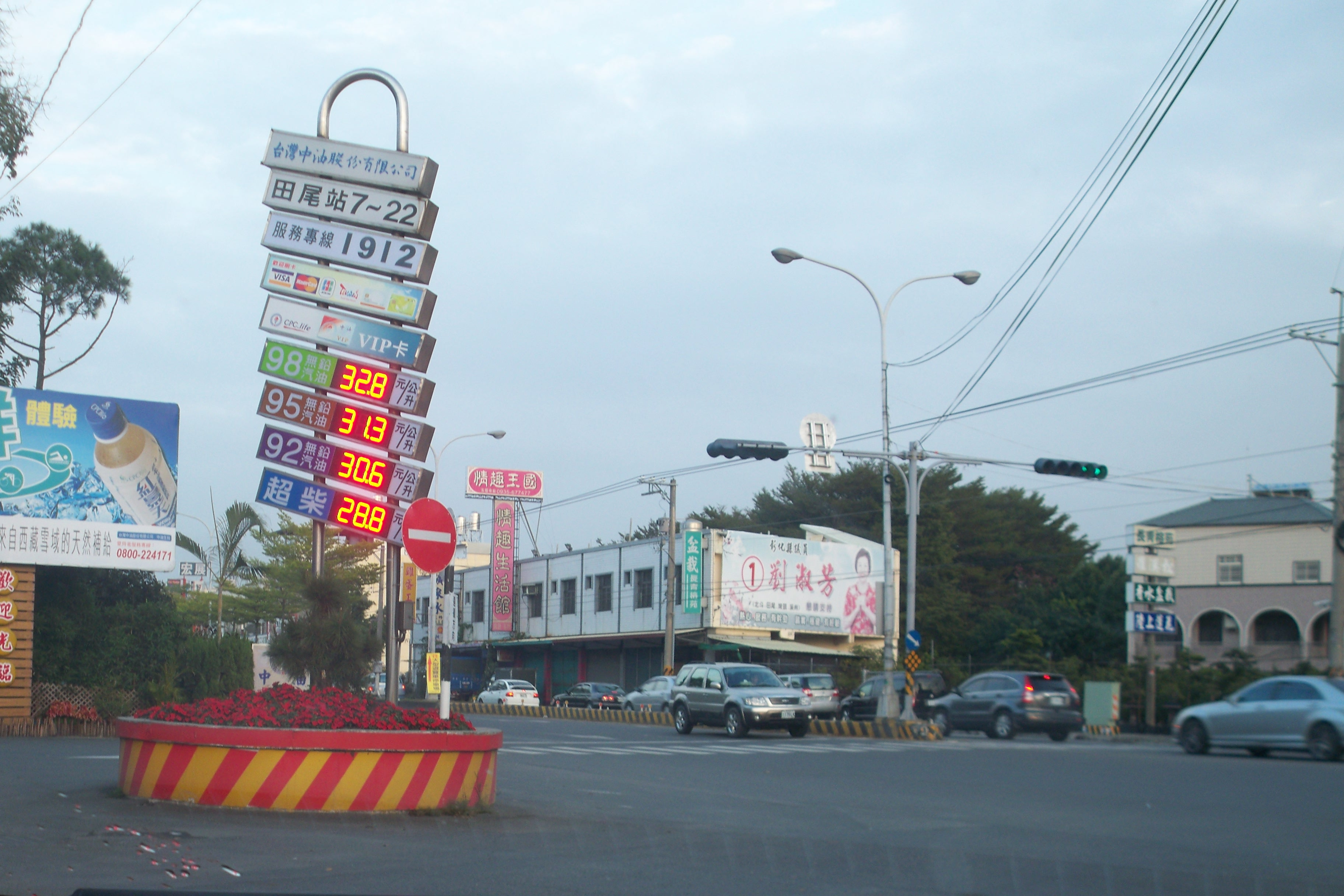

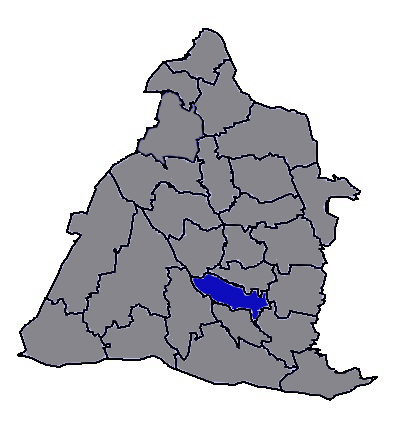
- Tianwei Township in Changhua County
- Location: Changhua County, Taiwan

Area
  - Total: 24 km^{2} (9.3 sq mi)

Population (January 2023)
  - Total: 26,063
  - Density: 1,100/km^{2} (2,800/sq mi)

Tianwei Township (Chinese: 田尾鄉; pinyin: Tiánwěi Xiāng) is a rural township in Changhua County, Taiwan. It has a population total of 26,063 and an area of 24.03 square kilometres.

== Administrative divisions ==
Tianwei, Xipan, Dalian, Zhengyi, Beizeng, Nanzeng, Raoping, Fengtian, Renli, Xincuo, Xiding, Liufeng, Liufeng, Haifeng, Muyi, Xinsheng, Beizeng, Nanzeng, Futian and Xinxing Village.

== Economy ==
Tianwei is a traditional center of the floriculture industry and is known as the “land of flowers."

== Notable natives ==
- Chen Chung-wu, legal scholar
- Chiu Chuang-huan, Vice Premier (1981–1984)
- Lo Fu-chu, member of Legislative Yuan (1996–2002)
