= Tan Tianwei =

Chinese biochemist (born 1964)

- 谭天伟
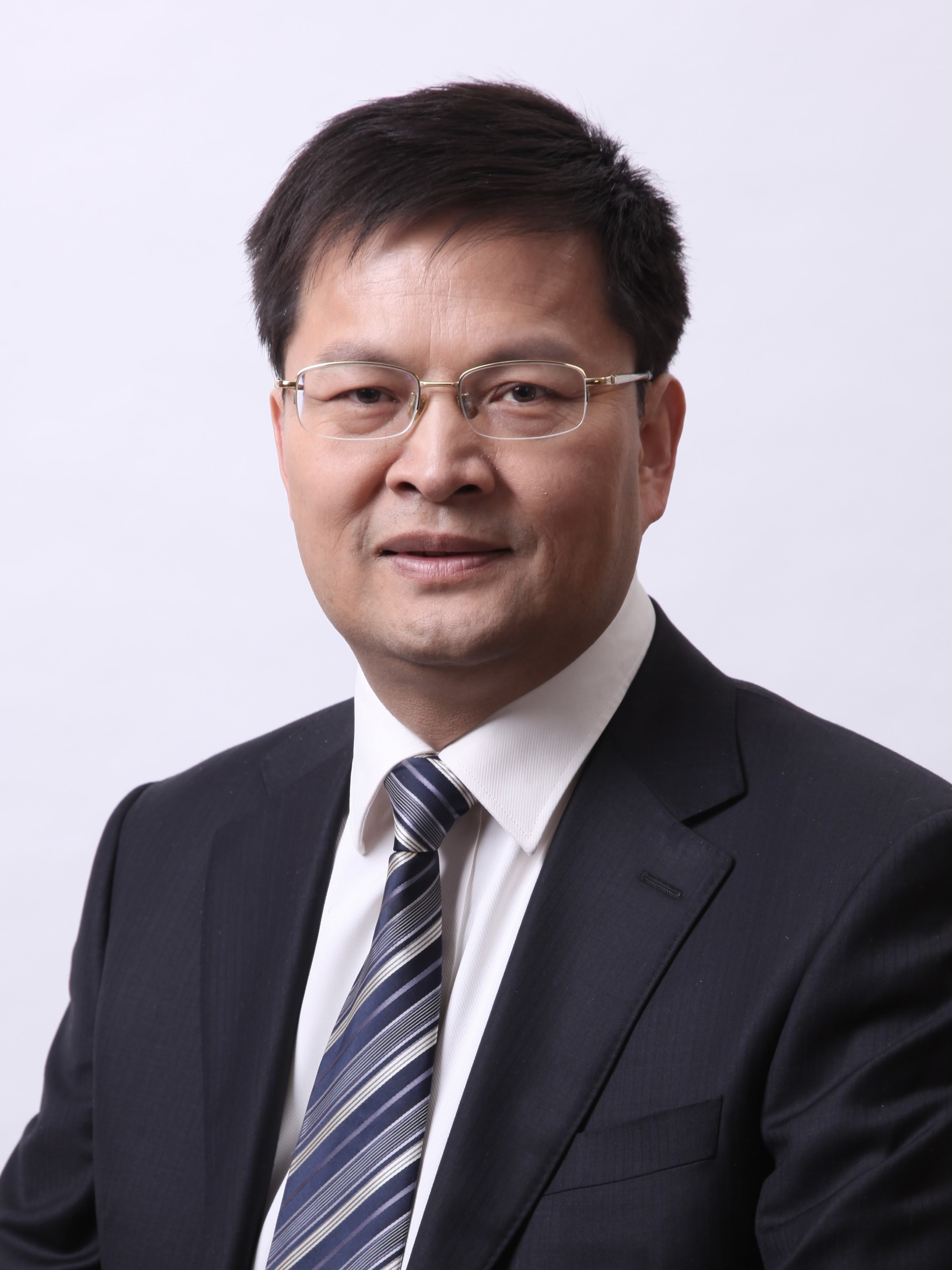
- Born: 1964 (age 61–62); Tianshui, Gansu Province
- Awards: Member of Chinese Academy of Engineering (2011)
- Scientific career
- Fields: Biochemical engineering
- Workplaces: Beijing University of Chemical Technology

Tan Tianwei (Chinese: 谭天伟; pinyin: Tān Tiānwěi; born February 1964) is a Chinese professor and an elected member of the Chinese Academy of Engineering. He was the president of Beijing University of Chemical Technology from 2012 to 2026. He is known for his work on biochemical engineering technologies, including bio-based chemicals, bio-energy, and bio-materials.

== Early life and education ==
Tan was born in Tianshui, Gansu Province, China. He studied chemical engineering at Tsinghua University beginning in 1981. He received his bachelor's degree and doctoral degree from the Department of Chemical Engineering at Tsinghua University in 1986 and 1993. During 1990–1992, he was doing research at the German Institute of Biotechnology and Lund University in Sweden as a joint Ph.D. student. After graduation, he joined the Beijing University of Chemical Technology (BUCT) as a postdoctoral researcher.

== Academic career ==
Tan joined the Department of Biochemical Engineering, Beijing University of Chemical Technology as a faculty member in 1995. From 1996 to 2003, he served as the dean of the Department of Biochemical Engineering, College of Chemical Engineering, BUCT. In 2001, he was funded by the Ministry of Education Outstanding Young Teacher Teaching and Research Award. In 2003, he was awarded the National Outstanding Young Scientist. From 2003 to 2007, he served as the first chairman of the College of Life Science and Technology, BUCT. Then, he served as the vice president of BUCT from 2007 to 2012. He was elected as an academician of the Chinese Academy of Engineering in 2011. Since 2021, he has served as the president of BUCT; In June 2022, he was elected the director of the Department of Chemical Engineering, Metallurgy and Materials Engineering, Chinese Academy of Engineering.

== Fellowships and societies ==
Chairman of the Ninth Council of China Renewable Energy Society 中国可再生能源学会第九届理事会理事长

Vice Chairman of China Chemical Industry Society 中国化工学会副理事长

Member of the Discipline Review Team of the National Natural Science Foundation of China 国家自然科学基金委员会学科评审组成员

Member of the Academic Committee of the State Key Laboratory of Biochemical Engineering 国家生物化工重点实验室学术委员会委员

Member of the Academic Committee of the State Key Laboratory of Bioreactor Engineering 生物反应器工程国家重点实验室学术委员会委员

Member of the Strategic Advisory Committee of the Green Manufacturing Public Service Platform绿色制造公共服务平台战略咨询委员会委员

Editorial Board《化工学报》编委

Editorial Board《生物工程学报》编委

Editorial Board《微生物通报》编委

Editorial Board《化工进展》编委

Editorial Board《化学反应工程与工艺》编委

Editorial Board《过程工程学报》编委

Editorial Board《现代化工》编委

Editorial Board《生物加工过程》编委

== Awards and honors ==
Tan and his research team have been focusing on lipase and enzyme-catalyzed synthetic chemicals and realized the production of lipase for organic synthesis and the application of enzyme industrial catalysis. They established a new method of fermentation amplification based on marker metabolite control, and used it in yeast fermentation products industrial production; At the same time, they developed a new technology for comprehensive utilization of fermentation waste mycelium for industrial application. He has published more than 500 SCI papers.

Tan won a lot of national technological inventions, provincial and ministerial level scientific and technological progress, as well as published more than 40 invention patents.

Year	Project	Award
1999	Production of Hyaluronic Acid by Fermentation 发酵法生产透明质酸	国家石油化工局科技进步一等奖，第一获奖人
2000	Extraction of Ergosterol, Chitosan and Glucosamine from Mycelium 从菌丝体中提取麦角固醇、壳聚糖和氨基葡萄糖	中国高校发明二等奖，第一获奖人
2001	New Technology and Application of Chitosan Production 壳聚糖生产新工艺及应用	中国石油化工科技进步二等奖，第一获奖人
2001	New Technology for Heavy Metal Wastewater Treatment 含重金属离子废水处理新技术	北京市科学技术发明一等奖，第一获奖人
2001	New Technology and Application of Chitosan Production 壳聚糖生产新工艺及应用	中国石油化工科技进步二等奖
2002	Comprehensive Utilization of Mycelium in Fermentation Industry 发酵工业菌丝体综合利用	国家发明二等奖，第一获奖人
2002	A New Technology for the Production of Chitooligosaccharide by Coupling of Reaction Separation 反应分离耦合生产壳低聚糖新技术	北京市科技进步二等奖，第一获奖人
2011	Construction of Novel Molecularly Imprinted Supramolecules and Their Molecular Recognition Mechanisms 新型分子印迹超分子构建及其分子识别机理的研究	教育部自然科学技术进步二等奖
2012	Novel Bioseparation Technology and Application Based on Supramolecular Recognition 基于超分子识别的新型生物分离技术及应用	中国石化联合会技术发明一等奖
2014	Research and application of fermentation process optimization based on marker metabolite control 基于标志代谢物控制的发酵过程优化研究与应用	北京市科学技术一等奖

There are more than 300 Ph.D. students and master students graduated under his advisor.

Tan won a lot of awards based on his research, teaching, organization services:

Year	Award	Organization
2000	Yingdong Huo Outstanding Young Teacher Award 霍英东优秀青年教师奖	
2000	Beijing Advanced Worker 北京市先进工作者	
2002	Special government allowance of the State Council 国务院政府特殊津贴	中华人民共和国国务院
2004	Chinese Chemical Society - BASF Youth Knowledge Innovation Award 中国化学会—巴斯夫公司青年知识创新奖	中国化学会、巴斯夫（中国）有限公司
2006	The 9th China Youth Science and Technology Award 第九届中国青年科技奖	中央组织部、人事部、中国科协
2006	Ho Leung Ho Lee Foundation Science and Technology Innovation Award 何梁何利基金科学与技术创新奖	何梁何利基金
2008	Outstanding Contribution Award of the 14th Asian Youth Biotechnology Conference 第十四届亚洲青年生物技术大会杰出贡献奖 (YABEC award)	
2009	Outstanding Contribution Award of the 2nd International Biorefinery Conference 第二届国际生物炼制大会杰出贡献奖	
2009	The 2nd Tan Jiazhen Life Science Award (Innovation Award) 第二届谈家桢生命科学奖 (创新奖)	联合基因科技有限公司
2009	The 5th Higher School Famous Teacher Award 第五届高等学校教学名师奖	中华人民共和国教育部
2011	Member of China Engineering Academy 中国工程院院士	中华人民共和国国务院
2013	The First Min Enze Energy and Chemical Industry Award 首届闵恩泽能源化工奖	中国石油化工集团公司、中国工程院
2014	The 3rd Outstanding Principal Award for Educational Reform and Innovation 第三届教育改革创新优秀校长奖	
2015	Evonik Friedrich Bergius Lecture Award 赢创Friedrich Bergius Lecture奖	
