= Billiards at the 2017 Summer Universiade =

Billiards tournament

Billiards at the XXIX Summer Universiade
- Venue: Expo Dome, Taipei Expo Park
- Dates: 25–29 August 2017
- Competitors: 29 from 8 nations

Billiards at the 2017 Summer Universiade was held in the Expo Dome, Taipei Expo Park, Taipei City, Taiwan, from August 25 to 29, 2017. Four competitions were held in men's and women's single 9-ball and in men and women's team 9-ball. Due to its status as a demonstration sport, the medals won in this sport event will be awarded, but will not be computed in the overall medal table.

== Participating nations ==
- Chinese Taipei (8) (H)
- Japan (2)
- Mongolia (4)
- Norway (2)
- Philippines (2)
- Singapore (4)
- Slovenia (3)
- South Korea (4)

== Medal table ==
Rank	Nation	Gold	Silver	Bronze	Total
1	Chinese Taipei (TPE)*	4	1	1	6
2	Mongolia (MGL)	0	1	1	2
3	Japan (JPN)	0	1	0	1
3	South Korea (KOR)	0	1	0	1
5	Norway (NOR)	0	0	2	2
Totals (5 entries)		4	4	4	12

== Medalists ==
Event	Gold	Silver	Bronze
Men's singles 9-ball	Hsu Jui-an; Chinese Taipei	Lin Cheng-chieh; Chinese Taipei	Eirik Riisnæs; Norway
Men's doubles 9-ball	Chinese Taipei (TPE); Ko Ping-chung; Ko Pin-yi	Japan (JPN); Kengo Suzuki; Takayuki Shishido	Norway (NOR); Eirik Riisnæs; Matias Sætre
Women's singles 9-ball	Ku Cheng-chin; Chinese Taipei	Narantuya Bayarsaikhan; Mongolia	Wu Zhi-ting; Chinese Taipei
Women's doubles 9-ball	Chinese Taipei (TPE); Wei Tzu-chien; Kuo Szu-ting	South Korea (KOR); Jang Yoon-hye; Jeong Eun-shu	Mongolia (MGL); Narantuya Bayarsaikhan; Uyanga Battulga
