= Yuanshan metro station =

Metro station in Taipei, Taiwan

Yuanshan 圓山
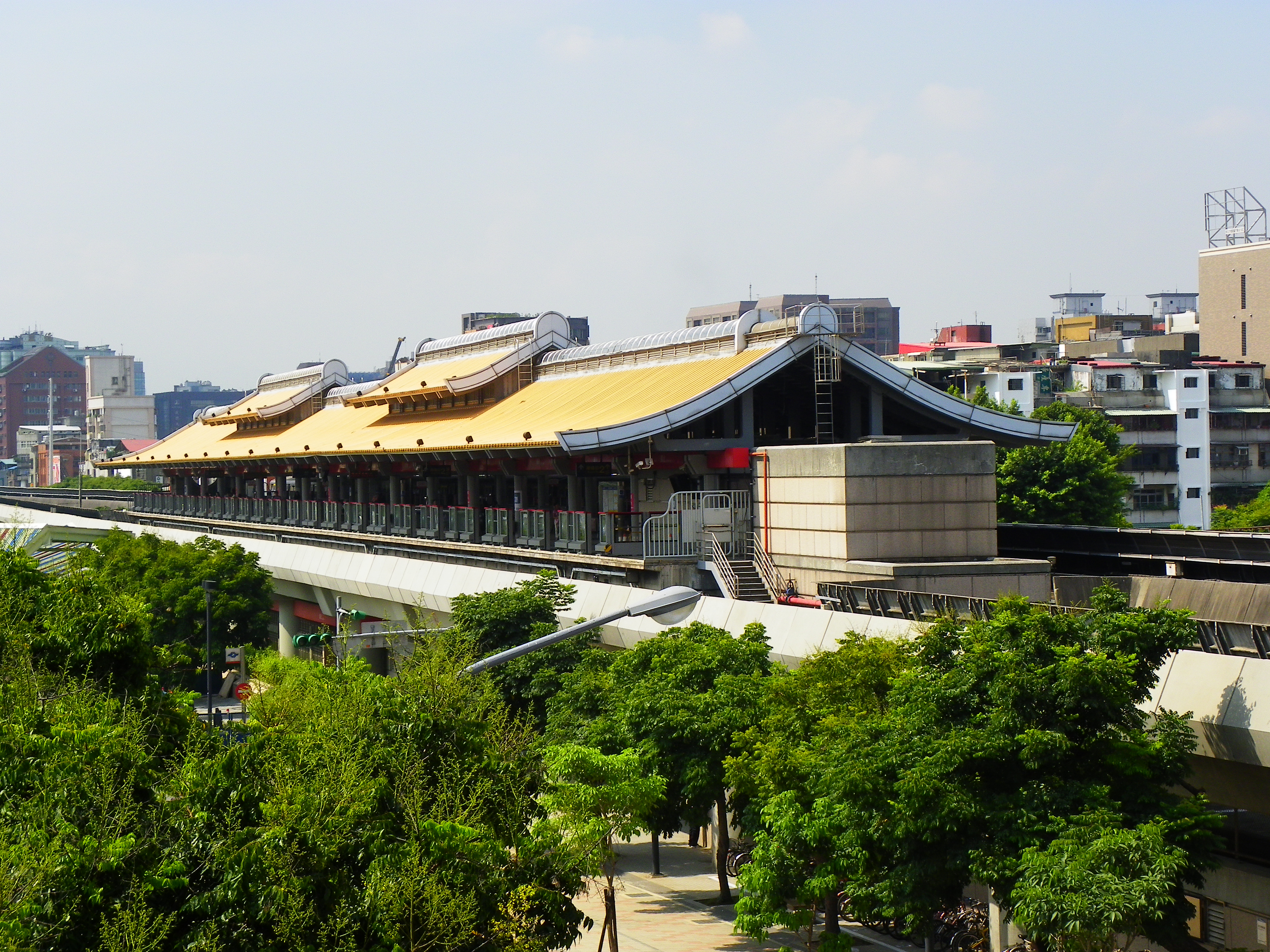
- Exterior of Yuanshan station

Chinese name
- Traditional Chinese: 圓山
- Simplified Chinese: 圆山
- Literal meaning: Round mountain
Transcriptions
Standard Mandarin
- Hanyu Pinyin: Yuánshān
- Bopomofo: ㄩㄢˊ ㄕㄢ
Hakka
- Pha̍k-fa-sṳ: Yèn-sân

Alternative Chinese name
- Traditional Chinese: 圓山仔
- Simplified Chinese: 圆山仔
Transcriptions
Southern Min
- Tâi-lô: Înn-suann-á

General information
- Location: 9-1 Jiuquan St; Zhongshan and Datong Districts, Taipei; Taiwan
- Coordinates: 25.0697°N 121.5202°E
- System: Taipei Metro station
- Line: Tamsui–Xinyi Line

Construction
- Structure type: Elevated
- Cycle facilities: Access available

Other information
- Station code: R14
- Website: web.metro.taipei/e/stationdetail2010.asp?ID=R14-056

History
- Opened: 1997-03-28

Passengers
- 2017: 19.468 million per year ▼2.55%
- Rank: (Ranked 23 of 119)

Services
Preceding station	Taipei Metro	Following station
Minquan West Road towards Xiangshan or Daan	Tamsui–Xinyi Line	Jiantan towards Tamsui or Beitou
Location

Yuanshan (Chinese: 圓山; pinyin: Yuánshān) is a metro station in Taipei, Taiwan served by Taipei Metro. It is a station on the Tamsui–Xinyi Line. There was a station of the same name on the now-defunct Tamsui railway line.

== Station overview ==
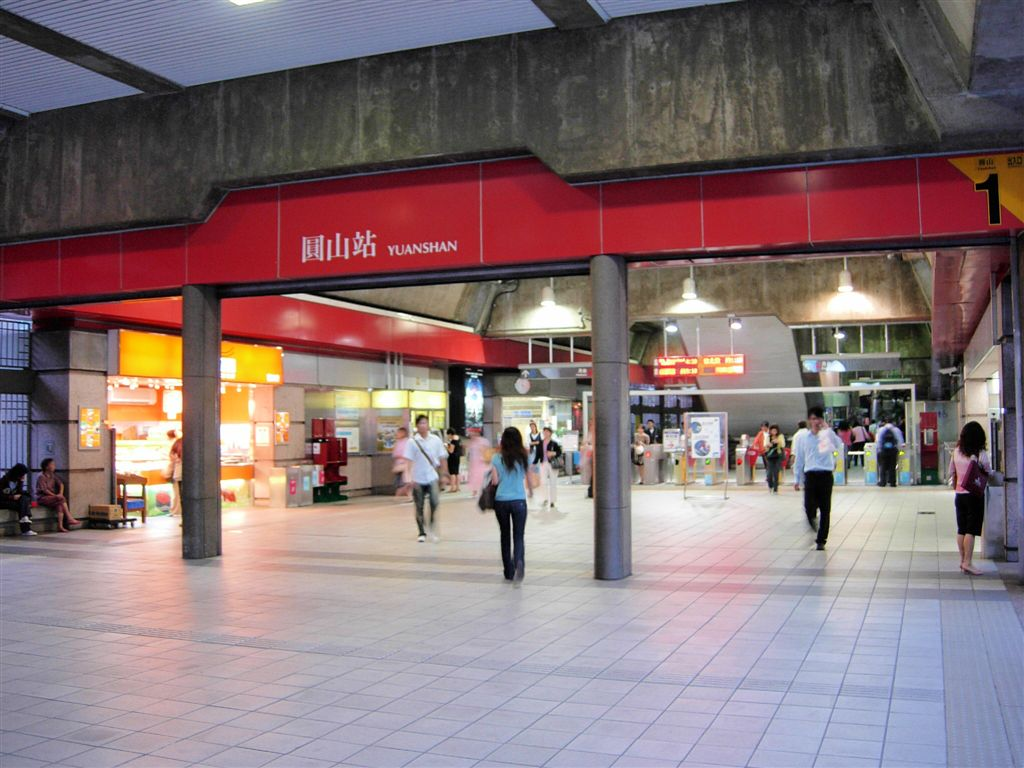
Exit 1

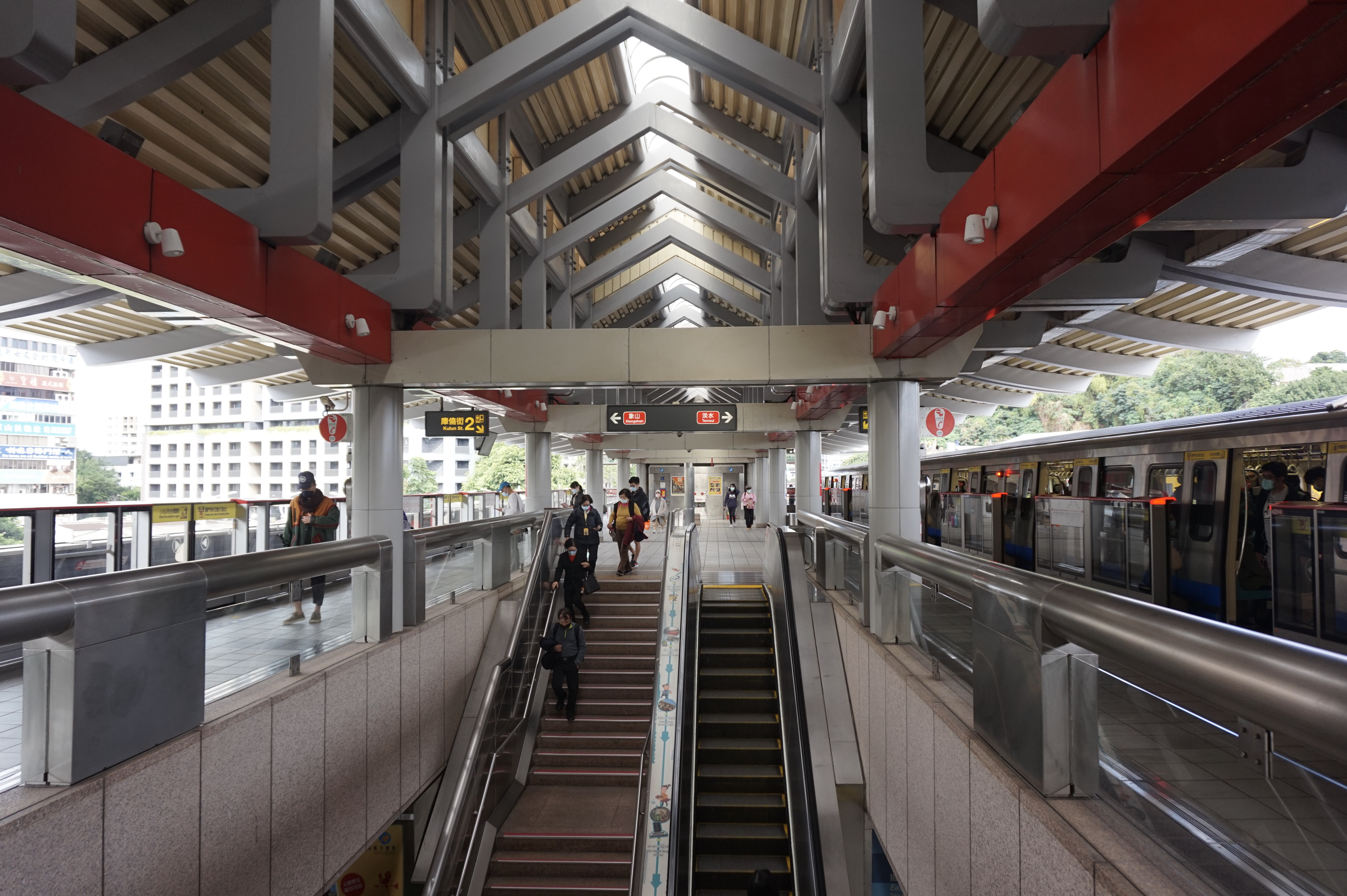
Platform level

This two-level, elevated station structure has one island platform and two exits. The station is situated on the West of Yumen Street, between Kulun Street and Jiuquan Street. The washrooms are inside the entrance area.

Notable landmarks are Taipei Expo Park, Chungshan Soccer Stadium, The Grand Hotel, Republic of China Military Police Headquarters, Yuanshan Park and Keelung River.

In anticipation of the 2010 Taipei International Flora Exposition, this became the first elevated, high-capacity station in the system with automatic platform gates installed.

== History ==
This station was opened on 25 October 1901 along the Tamsui Railway Line as Maruyama station (Japanese: 圓山停車場). South of the former station was a branch line to the Tatung Steel Factory. Now, it is the site of Tatung Company. It was however, closed on 15 July 1988. The Taipei Metro station opened on 28 March 1997.

== Station layout ==
2F	Platform 1	← Tamsui–Xinyi line toward Tamsui / Beitou (R15 Jiantan)
2F	Island platform, doors will open on the left
2F	Platform 2	→ Tamsui–Xinyi line toward Xiangshan / Daan (R13 Minquan West Road) →
Street level	Concourse	Exit to Taipei Expo Park, lobby, information desk, automatic ticket dispensing machines, one-way faregates Restrooms

== First and last train timings ==
The first and last train timings at Yuanshan station are as follows:

Destination	First train		Last train
Destination	Mon − Fri	Sat − Sun and P.H.	Daily
Tamsui–Xinyi line
R28 Tamsui	06:07	06:07	00:44
R01 guangci/fengtian palace station	06:03	06:03	00:51

== Around the station ==
- Linji Huguo Chan Temple
- Lin An Tai Historical House and Museum
- Tatung University
