= Taipei Expo Park =

Taiwanese multifunctional park

- 花博公園
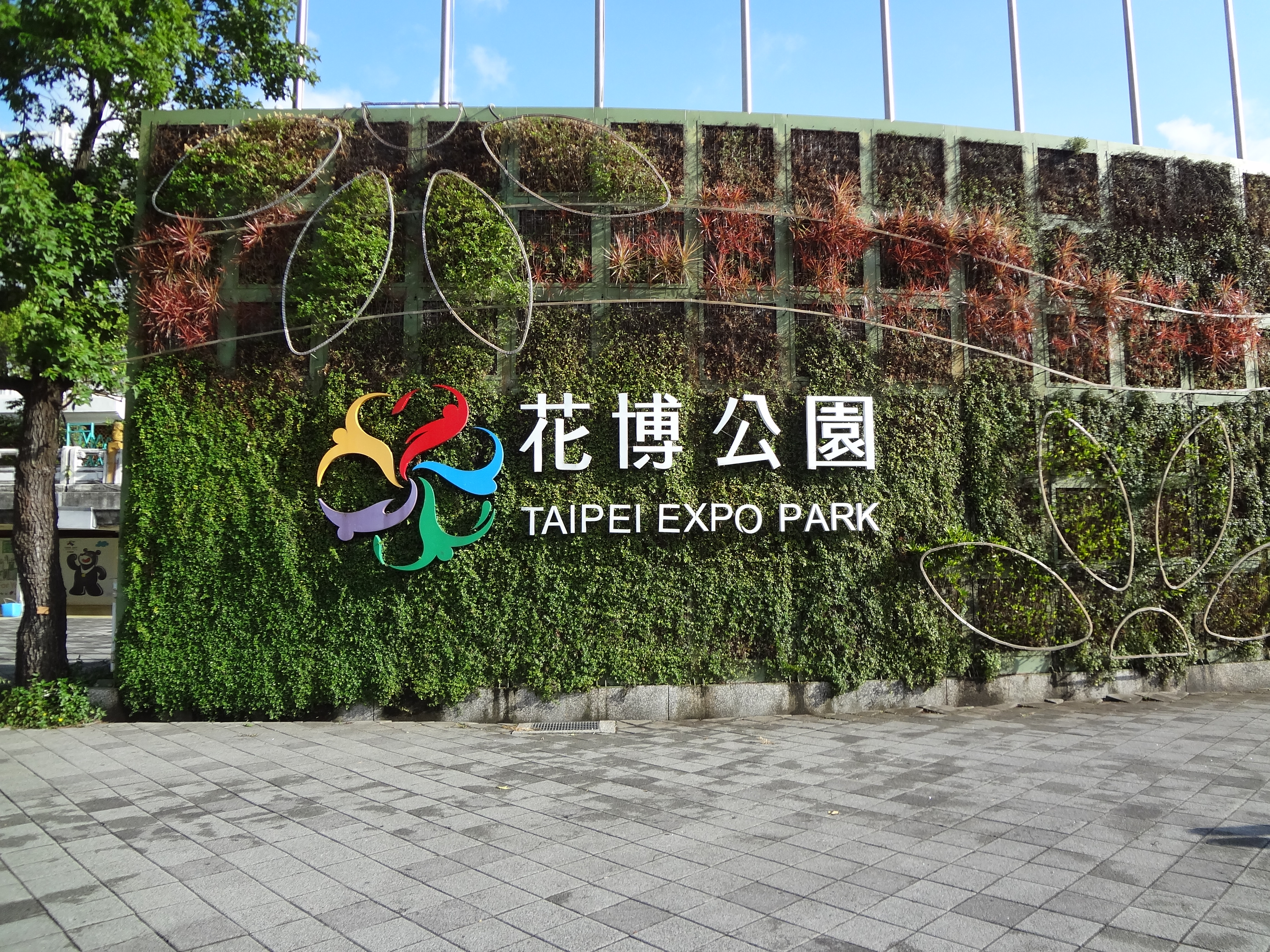
- Interactive map of Taipei Expo Park
- Location: Zhongshan, Taipei, Taiwan
- Coordinates: 25°04′15″N 121°31′42″E

Construction
- Opened: 6 November 2010

Website
- Official website

The Taipei Expo Park (traditional Chinese: 花博公園; simplified Chinese: 花博公园; pinyin: Huābó Gōngyuán) is a multifunctional park in Zhongshan District, Taipei, Taiwan.

== Park facilities ==
The Taipei Expo Park consists of:

- Taipei Children's Recreation Center
- Yuanshan Marketplace
- Yuanshan Plaza
- Expo Dome
- Taipei Story House
- Taipei Fine Arts Museum
- Taiwan Excellence Pavilion
- Pavilion of Aroma of Flowers
- Expo Hall
- Rose Garden
- Lin Ai-tai Historic House
- Pavilion of Future
- Pavilion of Taipei Robot
- Pavilion of Angel Life

== Notable events ==
- AI Expo Taiwan (2022–present)
- Taipei International Flora Exposition (2010–2011)
- Taipei Rose Garden (2017)
- Taipei Rose Festival (2020–present): Annual rose festival in Xingsheng park of the Taipei Expo Park showcasing over 5,000 rose bushes and 800 varieties.

== Transportation ==
The park is accessible within walking distance east from Yuanshan Station of the Taipei Metro.

== See also ==
- List of parks in Taiwan
- Taipei International Flora Exposition
- Zhongshan Soccer Stadium
