= Sambo at the 2013 Summer Universiade =

Sambo competitions

Sambo at the XXVII Summer Universiade
- Venue: Tatneft Arena
- Dates: July 14, 2013 – July 16, 2013

Sambo was contested at the 2013 Summer Universiade from July 14 to 16 at the Tatneft Arena in Kazan, Russia. Sambo made its debut at the 2013 Summer Universiade.

== Medal summary ==
=== Medal table ===
Rank	Nation	Gold	Silver	Bronze	Total
1	Russia (RUS)*	12	1	3	16
2	Belarus (BLR)	2	2	2	6
3	Japan (JPN)	2	1	2	5
4	Israel (ISR)	1	1	0	2
5	Armenia (ARM)	1	0	2	3
6	Ukraine (UKR)	0	5	2	7
7	Kazakhstan (KAZ)	0	2	2	4
8	Mongolia (MGL)	0	1	4	5
9	Bulgaria (BUL)	0	1	2	3
10	Argentina (ARG)	0	1	1	2
10	Tajikistan (TJK)	0	1	1	2
12	France (FRA)	0	1	0	1
12	Georgia (GEO)	0	1	0	1
14	Azerbaijan (AZE)	0	0	3	3
14	Turkmenistan (TKM)	0	0	3	3
16	China (CHN)	0	0	1	1
16	Italy (ITA)	0	0	1	1
16	Kyrgyzstan (KGZ)	0	0	1	1
16	Lithuania (LTU)	0	0	1	1
16	Moldova (MDA)	0	0	1	1
16	Serbia (SRB)	0	0	1	1
16	Slovenia (SLO)	0	0	1	1
16	Uzbekistan (UZB)	0	0	1	1
16	Venezuela (VEN)	0	0	1	1
Totals (24 entries)		18	18	36	72

=== Men's events ===
Event	Gold	Silver	Bronze
52 kg	Tigran Kirakosyan; Armenia	Beimbet Kanzhanov; Kazakhstan	Aghasif Samadov; Azerbaijan
52 kg	Tigran Kirakosyan; Armenia	Beimbet Kanzhanov; Kazakhstan	Vasiliy Karaulov; Russia
57 kg	Aymergen Atkunov; Russia	Maral-Erdene Chimeddorj; Mongolia	Islam Gasumov; Azerbaijan
57 kg	Aymergen Atkunov; Russia	Maral-Erdene Chimeddorj; Mongolia	Mykhailo Ilytchuk; Ukraine
62 kg	Ilya Khlybov; Russia	Bagdat Zharylgassov; Kazakhstan	Artur Te; Kyrgyzstan
62 kg	Ilya Khlybov; Russia	Bagdat Zharylgassov; Kazakhstan	Artiom Nacu; Moldova
68 kg	Denis Davydov; Russia	Aliaksandr Koksha; Belarus	Emil Hasanov; Azerbaijan
68 kg	Denis Davydov; Russia	Aliaksandr Koksha; Belarus	Martin Ivanov; Bulgaria
74 kg	Uali Kurzhev; Russia	Kota Eto; Japan	Alejandro Clara; Argentina
74 kg	Uali Kurzhev; Russia	Kota Eto; Japan	Nusratishokh Imonov; Tajikistan
82 kg	Sergey Kiruchin; Russia	Niko Kutsia; Georgia	Mher Karapetyan; Armenia
82 kg	Sergey Kiruchin; Russia	Niko Kutsia; Georgia	Tsimafei Yemelyanau; Belarus
90 kg	Pavel Rumyantsev; Russia	Komronshoh Ustopiriyon; Tajikistan	Nikola Milošević; Serbia
90 kg	Pavel Rumyantsev; Russia	Komronshoh Ustopiriyon; Tajikistan	Sukhrob Ostonayev; Uzbekistan
100 kg	Mikalai Matsko; Belarus	Peter Paltchik; Israel	Dmitriy Eliseev; Russia
100 kg	Mikalai Matsko; Belarus	Peter Paltchik; Israel	Mykhailo Cherkasov; Ukraine
+100 kg	Alexandr Kuchumov; Russia	Razmik Tonoyan; Ukraine	Hakob Arakaleyan; Armenia
+100 kg	Alexandr Kuchumov; Russia	Razmik Tonoyan; Ukraine	Zilvinas Zabarskas; Lithuania

=== Women's events ===
Event	Gold	Silver	Bronze
48 kg	Yelena Bondareva; Russia	Olena Kunytska; Ukraine	Chantsaldulam Jagvaral; Mongolia
48 kg	Yelena Bondareva; Russia	Olena Kunytska; Ukraine	Maria Guedez; Venezuela
52 kg	Anna Kharitonova; Russia	Inna Cherniak; Ukraine	Chen Fangfang; China
52 kg	Anna Kharitonova; Russia	Inna Cherniak; Ukraine	Gulbadam Babamuratova; Turkmenistan
56 kg	Anastasiia Arkhipava; Belarus	Laura Fournier; France	Gergana Vatsova; Bulgaria
56 kg	Anastasiia Arkhipava; Belarus	Laura Fournier; France	Amarjargal Tumurbaatar; Mongolia
60 kg	Yana Kostenko; Russia	Olena Sayko; Ukraine	Azhar Kenbeil; Kazakhstan
60 kg	Yana Kostenko; Russia	Olena Sayko; Ukraine	Polona Lampe; Slovenia
64 kg	Alice Schlesinger; Israel	Tatsiana Tokts; Belarus	Akane Ikuta; Japan
64 kg	Alice Schlesinger; Israel	Tatsiana Tokts; Belarus	Gulnar Hayytbayeva; Turkmenistan
68 kg	Marina Mokhnatkina; Russia	Luiza Gainutdinova; Ukraine	Giulia Aragozzini; Italy
68 kg	Marina Mokhnatkina; Russia	Luiza Gainutdinova; Ukraine	Dildash Kuryshbayeva; Kazakhstan
72 kg	Rui Takahashi; Japan	Zhanara Kusanova; Russia	Munkhtsetseg Otgon; Mongolia
72 kg	Rui Takahashi; Japan	Zhanara Kusanova; Russia	Nursoltan Ashyrova; Turkmenistan
80 kg	Shori Hamada; Japan	Tereza Dzhurova; Bulgaria	Nyamtuya Nyamkhuu; Mongolia
80 kg	Shori Hamada; Japan	Tereza Dzhurova; Bulgaria	Irina Alekseeva; Russia
+80 kg	Anastasia Kovyazina; Russia	Samantha Dacunha Kessler; Argentina	Katsiaryna Kaliuzhnaya; Belarus
+80 kg	Anastasia Kovyazina; Russia	Samantha Dacunha Kessler; Argentina	Haruka Murase; Japan
