= Athletics at the 2013 Summer Universiade =

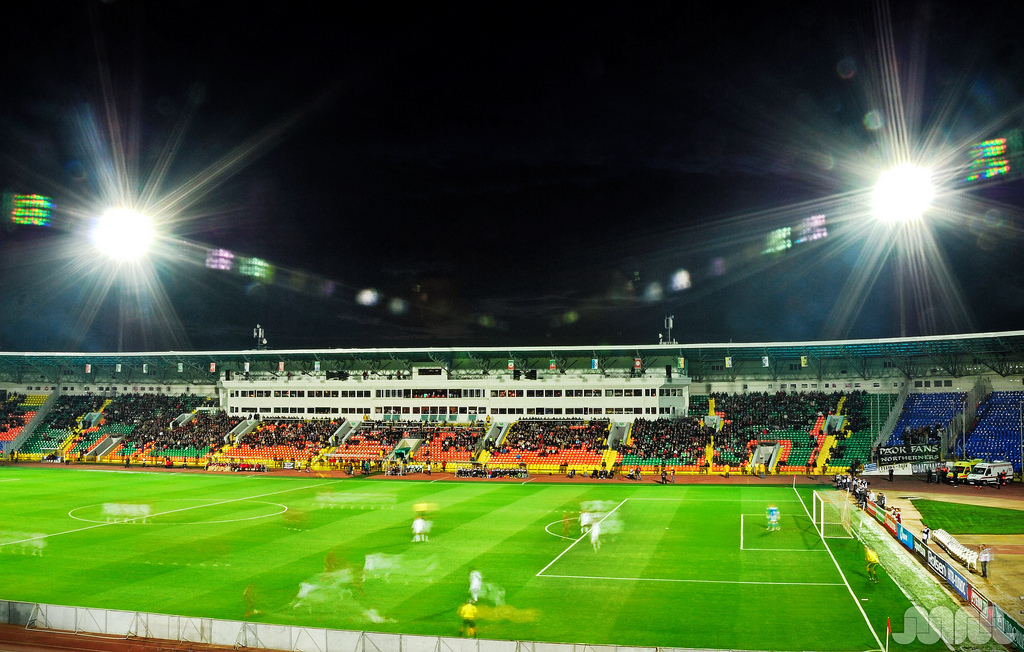
- Host stadium in Kazan.
- Dates: July 7, 2013 – July 12, 2013
- Host city: Kazan, Russia
- Venue: Central Stadium
- Level: Senior
- Events: 46
- Participation: 930 athletes from 115 nations
- Records set: 7 UR's

Athletics was contested at the 2013 Summer Universiade from July 7 to 12 at the Universiade Village Stadium and the Central Stadium in Kazan, Russia.

Level of participation and performance was moderate. The proximity of other important athletics competitions like Asian Championships, South American Championships, Central American and Caribbean Championships and European U23 Championships caused many high-profile student-athletes to skip the event. The host nation, Russia, however, fielded most of its top athletes which resulted in three Universiade records and first place on the medal table with a huge lead over the second nation, Ukraine.

== Medal summary ==
On 18 May 2017, the rankings of the Women's Heptathlon and 1,500m were updated further to the suspension of two Russian female athletes by the Court of Arbitration for Sport (CAS).

On 13 November 2020, the rankings of the Women's 3000m steeplechase were updated further to the suspension of two Russians, one Ukrainian and one Turkish female athletes by the Court of Arbitration for Sport (CAS).

On 12 August 2022, the results of Russian Irina Tarasova between July 2012 and July 2016 were annulled by the Athletics Integrity Unit for doping violation. This means that her gold medal in the women's shot put has been stripped.

=== Men's events ===
Event	Gold		Silver		Bronze	
100 metres	Anaso Jobodwana; South Africa	10.10	Ryota Yamagata; Japan	10.21	Wilfried Koffi Hua; Ivory Coast	10.21
200 metres	Anaso Jobodwana; South Africa	20.00	Rasheed Dwyer; Jamaica	20.23	Shōta Iizuka; Japan	20.33
400 metres	Vladimir Krasnov; Russia	45.49	Anderson Henriques; Brazil	45.50	Nicholas Maitland; Jamaica	45.63
800 metres	Nijel Amos; Botswana	1:46.53	Jozef Repčík; Slovakia	1:47.30 SB	Andreas Vojta; Austria	1:47.31
1500 metres	Valentin Smirnov; Russia	3:39.39	Jeremy Rae; Canada	3:39.45	Jeremiah Motsau; South Africa	3:39.51
5000 metres	Hayle Ibrahimov; Azerbaijan	13:35.89 UR	Paul Chelimo; Kenya	13:37.09	Richard Ringer; Germany	13:37.18
10,000 metres	Stephen Mokoka; South Africa	28:45.96	Anatoly Rybakov; Russia	28:47.27	Yevgeny Rybakov; Russia	28:47.28
110 metres hurdles	Eddie Lovett; Virgin Islands	13.43 NR	Konstantin Shabanov; Russia	13.46 SB	Sergey Shubenkov; Russia	13.47
400 metres hurdles	Martin Kučera; Slovakia	49.79 PB	Amadou Ndiaye; Senegal	49.90	Ian Dewhurst; Australia	49.96
3000 metres steeplechase	Ilgizar Safiullin; Russia	8:32.53	Sebastián Martos; Spain	8:37.94	Patrick Nasti; Italy	8:38.41
4x100 metres relay	Ukraine (UKR); Ruslan Perestiuk; Serhiy Smelyk; Ihor Bodrov; Vitaliy Korzh	38.56	Japan (JPN); Ryota Yamagata; Yousuke Hara; Rui Yonaguni; Shōta Iizuka	39.12	Poland (POL); Jakub Adamski; Dariusz Kuć; Artur Zaczek; Kamil Kryński	39.29
4x400 metres relay	Canada (CAN); Benjamin Ayesu-Attah; Brendon Rodney; Michael Robertson; Tyler Harper	3:05.26	South Africa (RSA); Pieter Conradie; Jacques de Swardt; Pieter Beneke; Wayde van Niekerk	3:06.19	Turkey (TUR); Buğrahan Kocabeyoğlu; Halit Kiliç; Mehmet Güzel; Yavuz Can	3:06.36
20 kilometres walk	Andrey Krivov; Russia	1:20:47 UR	Ruslan Dmytrenko; Ukraine	1:20:54	Denis Strelkov; Russia	1:21:32
20 km walk team	Russia (RUS); Valery Filipchuk; Andrey Krivov; Konstantin Kulagov; Andrey Ruzavin; Denis Strelkov	4:04:31	Ukraine (UKR); Ruslan Dmytrenko; Igor Glavan; Nazar Kovalenko; Ivan Losyev	4:08:09	Canada (CAN); Evan Dunfee; Inaki Gomez; Benjamin Thorne	4:20:35
Half marathon	Sibabalwe Mzazi; South Africa	1:03:37 SB	Stephen Mokoka; South Africa	1:03:37	Shogo Nakamura; Japan	1:04:21
Half marathon team	South Africa (RSA); Sibabalwe Mzazi; Stephen Mokoka; Xolisane Zamkele	3:12:52	Japan (JPN); Shogo Nakamura; Hiroki Yamagishi; Shota Hattori; Toshikatsu Ebina; Yuta Shitara	3:14:02	Russia (RUS); Andrey Leyman; Anatoly Rybakov; Artem Aplachkin; Yuri Chechun; Yevgeniy Pishchalov	3:16:38
High jump	Sergey Mudrov; Russia	2.31	Andriy Protsenko; Ukraine	2.31	Wang Yu; China	2.28
Pole vault	Sam Kendricks; United States	5.60	Seito Yamamoto; Japan	5.60	Nikita Filippov; Kazakhstan	5.50
Long jump	Luis Rivera; Mexico	8.46 WL, NR, UR	Aleksandr Menkov; Russia	8.42 PB	Marcos Chuva; Portugal	8.15 SB
Triple jump	Viktor Kuznyetsov; Ukraine	17.01	Aleksey Fyodorov; Russia	16.89	Yevgeniy Ektov; Kazakhstan	16.57
Shot put	Aleksandr Lesnoy; Russia	20.30	Inderjeet Singh; India	19.70	Valeriy Kokoev; Russia	19.65
Discus throw	Ronald Julião; Brazil	63.54	Giovanni Faloci; Italy	62.23	Gleb Sidorchenko; Russia	62.16
Hammer throw	Paweł Fajdek; Poland	79.99	Marcel Lomnický; Slovakia	78.73	Yury Shayunou; Belarus	75.82
Javelin throw	Dmitry Tarabin; Russia	83.11	John Robert Oosthuizen; South Africa	81.63	Fatih Avan; Turkey	81.24
Decathlon	Thomas Van Der Plaetsen; Belgium	8164	Sergey Sviridov; Russia	7939	Brent Newdick; New Zealand	7611

=== Women's events ===
Event	Gold		Silver		Bronze	
100 metres	Aurieyall Scott; United States	11.28	Lina Grinčikaitė; Lithuania	11.32	Andreea Ogrăzeanu; Romania	11.41
200 metres	Kimberly Hyacinthe; Canada	22.78 PB	Hanna-Maari Latvala; Finland	22.98 PB	Andreea Ogrăzeanu; Romania	23.10 PB
400 metres	Kseniya Ustalova; Russia	50.60	Alena Tamkova; Russia	51.17	Anastasia Le-Roy; Jamaica	51.72
800 metres	Margarita Mukasheva; Kazakhstan	1:58.96	Ekaterina Kupina; Russia	1:59.57	Eglė Balčiūnaitė; Lithuania	1:59.82
1500 metres	Elena Korobkina; Russia	4:08.13	Luiza Gega; Albania	4:08.71	Margherita Magnani; Italy	4:09.72
5000 metres	Olga Golovkina; Russia	15:43.77	Ayuko Suzuki; Japan	15:51.47	Mai Shoji; Japan	16:11.90
10,000 metres	Ayuko Suzuki; Japan	32:54.17	Alina Prokopyeva; Russia	33:00.93	Mai Tsuda; Japan	33:14.59
100 metres hurdles	Vashti Thomas; United States	12.61 UR	Alina Talay; Belarus	12.78 SB	Danielle Williams; Jamaica	12.84
400 metres hurdles	Hanna Titimets; Ukraine	54.64	Hanna Yaroshchuk; Ukraine	54.77	Irina Davydova; Russia	54.79
3000 metres steeplechase	Chantelle Groenewoud; Canada	9:51.17	Jessica Furlan; Canada	9:51.23	Sandra Eriksson; Finland	9:55.11
4x100 metres relay	Ukraine (UKR); Olesya Povh; Nataliya Pohrebnyak; Mariya Ryemyen; Viktoriya Piatachenko	42.77	United States (USA); Vashti Thomas; Aurieyall Scott; Jade Barber; Tristie Johnson	43.54	Poland (POL); Marika Popowicz; Weronika Wedler; Ewelina Ptak; Małgorzata Kołdej	43.81
4x400 metres relay	Russia (RUS); Alena Tamkova; Nadezhda Kotlyarova; Ekaterina Renzhina; Kseniya Ustalova	3:26.61	Canada (CAN); Noelle Montcalm; Sarah-Lynn Wells; Helen Crofts; Alicia Brown	3:32.93	South Africa (RSA); Sonja van der Merwe; Arista Nienaber; Justine Palframan; Anneri Ebersohn	3:36.05
20 kilometres walk	Irina Yumanova; Russia	1:30:41	Lina Bikulova; Russia	1:32:30	Hanna Drabenia; Belarus	1:33:15
20 km walk team	China (CHN); Yang Mingxia; Gao Ni; Zhou Tongmei; Zhang Xin	4:49:54	Russia (RUS); Lina Bikulova; Vera Sokolova; Irina Yumanova	3:33:11	none	
Half marathon	Mai Tsuda; Japan	1:13:12	Alina Prokopyeva; Russia	1:13:18	Yukiko Okuno; Japan	1:13:24
Half marathon team	Japan (JPN); Ayako Mitsui; Yukiko Okuno; Hitomi Suzuki; Mai Tsuda; Yasuka Ueno	3:40:41	Russia (RUS); Valentina Galimova; Lyudmila Lebedeva; Natalia Novichkova; Alina Prokopyeva; Elena Sedova	3:40:49	China (CHN); Zhou Jing; Sun Lamei; Gong Lihua; Mei Ying	3:57:30
High jump	Kamila Stepaniuk; Poland	1.96	Mariya Kuchina; Russia	1.96 PB	Anna Iljuštšenko; Estonia	1.94 SB
Pole vault	Anastasia Savchenko; Russia	4.60	Martina Schultze; Germany	4.40 PB	Fanny Smets; Belgium	4.30 PB
Long jump	Darya Klishina; Russia	6.90	Yelena Sokolova; Russia	6.73	Michelle Weitzel; Germany	6.56
Triple jump	Ekaterina Koneva; Russia	14.82 UR	Anna Jagaciak; Poland	14.21	Carmen Cristina Toma; Romania	14.14
Shot put	Liu Xiangrong; China	18.58	Natalia Ducó; Chile	17.96	Anita Martón; Hungary	17.92
Discus throw	Vera Ganeeva; Russia	61.26	Yelena Panova; Russia	56.86	Maryke Oberholzer; South Africa	54.09
Hammer throw	Jeneva McCall; United States	73.75	Oksana Kondratyeva; Russia	72.22	Zalina Marghieva; Moldova	71.10
Javelin throw	Mariya Abakumova; Russia	65.12	Viktoriya Sudarushkina; Russia	62.68	Elisabeth Eberl; Austria	55.02
Heptathlon	Laura Ikauniece; Latvia	6321 SB	Györgyi Farkas; Hungary	6269 PB	Eliska Klucinova; Czech Republic	6124

== Medal table ==
Rank	Nation	Gold	Silver	Bronze	Total
1	Russia (RUS)*	18	17	7	42
2	South Africa (RSA)	5	4	3	12
3	Ukraine (UKR)	4	3	0	7
4	United States (USA)	4	1	0	5
5	Japan (JPN)	3	5	5	13
6	Canada (CAN)	3	3	1	7
7	Poland (POL)	2	1	2	5
8	China (CHN)	2	0	2	4
9	Slovakia (SVK)	1	2	0	3
10	Brazil (BRA)	1	1	0	2
11	Kazakhstan (KAZ)	1	0	2	3
12	Belgium (BEL)	1	0	1	2
13	Azerbaijan (AZE)	1	0	0	1
13	Botswana (BOT)	1	0	0	1
13	Latvia (LAT)	1	0	0	1
13	Mexico (MEX)	1	0	0	1
13	Virgin Islands (ISV)	1	0	0	1
18	Jamaica (JAM)	0	1	3	4
19	Belarus (BLR)	0	1	2	3
19	Germany (GER)	0	1	2	3
19	Italy (ITA)	0	1	2	3
22	Finland (FIN)	0	1	1	2
22	Hungary (HUN)	0	1	1	2
22	Lithuania (LTU)	0	1	1	2
25	Albania (ALB)	0	1	0	1
25	Chile (CHI)	0	1	0	1
25	India (IND)	0	1	0	1
25	Kenya (KEN)	0	1	0	1
25	Senegal (SEN)	0	1	0	1
25	Spain (ESP)	0	1	0	1
31	Romania (ROU)	0	0	3	3
32	Austria (AUT)	0	0	2	2
32	Turkey (TUR)	0	0	2	2
34	Australia (AUS)	0	0	1	1
34	Czech Republic (CZE)	0	0	1	1
34	Estonia (EST)	0	0	1	1
34	Ivory Coast (CIV)	0	0	1	1
34	Moldova (MDA)	0	0	1	1
34	New Zealand (NZL)	0	0	1	1
34	Portugal (POR)	0	0	1	1
Totals (40 entries)		50	50	49	149

== Participating nations ==
- Albania (2)
- American Samoa (1)
- Anguilla (1)
- Armenia (1)
- Argentina (2)
- Australia (19)
- Austria (3)
- Azerbaijan (2)
- Bangladesh (2)
- Barbados (2)
- Belarus (8)
- Belgium (6)
- Bermuda (4)
- Botswana (12)
- Brazil (5)
- Burkina Faso (2)
- Cameroon (2)
- Canada (51)
- Central African Republic (2)
- Chad (2)
- Chile (10)
- China (24)
- Chinese Taipei (8)
- Colombia (7)
- Comoros (1)
- Costa Rica (3)
- Curaçao (1)
- Czech Republic (14)
- Democratic Republic of the Congo (2)
- Denmark (5)
- Djibouti (1)
- Ecuador (2)
- Egypt (5)
- Estonia (25)
- Ethiopia (2)
- Fiji (2)
- Finland (14)
- Germany (15)
- Ghana (16)
- Greece (3)
- Guatemala (1)
- Honduras (1)
- Hong Kong (3)
- Hungary (6)
- India (16)
- Indonesia (4)
- Iran (1)
- Ireland (9)
- Israel (6)
- Italy (12)
- Ivory Coast (2)
- Jamaica (8)
- Japan (30)
- Kazakhstan (16)
- Kenya (4)
- Kyrgyzstan (3)
- Latvia (18)
- Lebanon (3)
- Lesotho (1)
- Lithuania (21)
- Luxembourg (4)
- Macau (6)
- Malaysia (7)
- Mali (3)
- Malta (3)
- Mexico (15)
- Moldova (5)
- Mongolia (4)
- Namibia (6)
- Netherlands (3)
- New Zealand (8)
- Niger (2)
- Norway (18)
- Oman (6)
- Pakistan (7)
- Palestine (1)
- Panama (1)
- Poland (21)
- Portugal (6)
- Puerto Rico (2)
- Qatar (2)
- Republic of the Congo (1)
- Romania (16)
- Russia (98)
- Rwanda (1)
- Samoa (1)
- Senegal (7)
- Serbia (1)
- Singapore (4)
- Slovakia (7)
- Slovenia (8)
- Somalia (1)
- South Africa (26)
- South Korea (7)
- Spain (7)
- Sri Lanka (15)
- Swaziland (2)
- Sweden (13)
- Switzerland (11)
- Tajikistan (8)
- Tanzania (2)
- Thailand (10)
- Togo (1)
- Trinidad and Tobago (2)
- Turkey (26)
- Turkmenistan (2)
- Uganda (14)
- Ukraine (21)
- United Arab Emirates (2)
- United States (15)
- United States Virgin Islands (6)
- Uzbekistan (1)
- Vietnam (2)
- Zambia (2)
- Zimbabwe (6)

== See also ==
- 2013 in the sport of athletics
- FISU World University Games
- University and college sport
