= Wrestling at the 2013 Summer Universiade =

Wrestling at the XXVII Summer Universiade
- Venue: Ak Bars Wrestling Palace
- Dates: 11–16 July

Wrestling was contested at the 2013 Summer Universiade from July 11 to 16 at the Ak Bars Wrestling Palace in Kazan, Russia.

== Medal summary ==
=== Men's freestyle ===
Event	Gold	Silver	Bronze
55 kg	Nariman Israpilov; Russia	Samat Nadyrbek Uulu; Kyrgyzstan	Fumitaka Morishita; Japan
55 kg	Nariman Israpilov; Russia	Samat Nadyrbek Uulu; Kyrgyzstan	Berdakh Primbayev; Kazakhstan
60 kg	Bekkhan Goygereev; Russia	Behnam Ehsanpour; Iran	Haji Aliyev; Azerbaijan
60 kg	Bekkhan Goygereev; Russia	Behnam Ehsanpour; Iran	Vasyl Shuptar; Ukraine
66 kg	Magomed Kurbanaliev; Russia	David Safaryan; Armenia	Ganzorigiin Mandakhnaran; Mongolia
66 kg	Magomed Kurbanaliev; Russia	David Safaryan; Armenia	Semen Radulov; Ukraine
74 kg	Denis Tsargush; Russia	Jabrayil Hasanov; Azerbaijan	Zaur Efendiev; Serbia
74 kg	Denis Tsargush; Russia	Jabrayil Hasanov; Azerbaijan	David Taylor; United States
84 kg	Gheorghiță Ștefan; Romania	Shamil Kudiyamagomedov; Russia	Piotr Ianulov; Moldova
84 kg	Gheorghiță Ștefan; Romania	Shamil Kudiyamagomedov; Russia	Mohammad Hossein Mohammadian; Iran
96 kg	Abdusalam Gadisov; Russia	Pavlo Oliynyk; Ukraine	Alikhan Zhumayev; Kazakhstan
96 kg	Abdusalam Gadisov; Russia	Pavlo Oliynyk; Ukraine	Dorjkhandyn Khüderbulga; Mongolia
120 kg	Taha Akgül; Turkey	Oleksandr Khotsianivskyi; Ukraine	Parviz Hadi; Iran
120 kg	Taha Akgül; Turkey	Oleksandr Khotsianivskyi; Ukraine	Tyrell Fortune; United States

=== Men's Greco-Roman ===
Event	Gold	Silver	Bronze
55 kg	Ivan Tatarinov; Russia	Victor Ciobanu; Moldova	Shota Tanokura; Japan
55 kg	Ivan Tatarinov; Russia	Victor Ciobanu; Moldova	Eldaniz Azizli; Azerbaijan
60 kg	Ivan Kuylakov; Russia	Kamran Mammadov; Azerbaijan	Tornike Turkishvili; Georgia
60 kg	Ivan Kuylakov; Russia	Kamran Mammadov; Azerbaijan	Almat Kebispayev; Kazakhstan
66 kg	Rasul Chunayev; Azerbaijan	Islambek Albiev; Russia	Askhat Zhanbirov; Kazakhstan
66 kg	Rasul Chunayev; Azerbaijan	Islambek Albiev; Russia	Muhammed Kocatınaz; Turkey
74 kg	Roman Vlasov; Russia	Hadi Alizadeh; Iran	Dmytro Pyshkov; Ukraine
74 kg	Roman Vlasov; Russia	Hadi Alizadeh; Iran	Arsen Julfalakyan; Armenia
84 kg	Alan Khugaev; Russia	Maksim Manukyan; Armenia	Javid Hamzatau; Belarus
84 kg	Alan Khugaev; Russia	Maksim Manukyan; Armenia	Zhan Beleniuk; Ukraine
96 kg	Nikita Melnikov; Russia	Artur Aleksanyan; Armenia	Mikheil Kajaia; Georgia
96 kg	Nikita Melnikov; Russia	Artur Aleksanyan; Armenia	Mehdi Aliyari; Iran
120 kg	Rıza Kayaalp; Turkey	Amir Aliakbari; Iran	Bálint Lám; Hungary
120 kg	Rıza Kayaalp; Turkey	Amir Aliakbari; Iran	Nurmakhan Tinaliyev; Kazakhstan

=== Women's freestyle ===
Event	Gold	Silver	Bronze
48 kg	Eri Tosaka; Japan	Patimat Bagomedova; Azerbaijan	Valeriya Chepsarakova; Russia
48 kg	Eri Tosaka; Japan	Patimat Bagomedova; Azerbaijan	Mariya Livach; Ukraine
51 kg	Hikari Sugawara; Japan	Erdenechimegiin Sumiyaa; Mongolia	Yuliya Blahinya; Ukraine
51 kg	Hikari Sugawara; Japan	Erdenechimegiin Sumiyaa; Mongolia	Ekaterina Krasnova; Russia
55 kg	Valeria Koblova; Russia	Iryna Husyak; Ukraine	Hwang Sun-byol; North Korea
55 kg	Valeria Koblova; Russia	Iryna Husyak; Ukraine	Kanako Murata; Japan
59 kg	Yuliya Ratkevich; Azerbaijan	Alli Ragan; United States	Aisuluu Tynybekova; Kyrgyzstan
59 kg	Yuliya Ratkevich; Azerbaijan	Alli Ragan; United States	Emese Barka; Hungary
63 kg	Soronzonboldyn Battsetseg; Mongolia	Maria Lyulkova; Russia	Irina Netreba; Azerbaijan
63 kg	Soronzonboldyn Battsetseg; Mongolia	Maria Lyulkova; Russia	Maryia Mamashuk; Belarus
67 kg	Sara Dosho; Japan	Ochirbatyn Nasanburmaa; Mongolia	Stacie Anaka; Canada
67 kg	Sara Dosho; Japan	Ochirbatyn Nasanburmaa; Mongolia	Alina Stadnyk; Ukraine
72 kg	Ekaterina Bukina; Russia	Brittney Roberts; United States	Erica Wiebe; Canada
72 kg	Ekaterina Bukina; Russia	Brittney Roberts; United States	Halina Leuchanka; Belarus

== Medal table ==
Rank	Nation	Gold	Silver	Bronze	Total
1	Russia	12	3	2	17
2	Japan	3	0	3	6
3	Azerbaijan	2	3	3	8
4	Turkey	2	0	1	3
5	Mongolia	1	2	2	5
6	Romania	1	0	0	1
7	Ukraine	0	3	7	10
8	Iran	0	3	3	6
9	Armenia	0	3	1	4
10	United States	0	2	2	4
11	Kyrgyzstan	0	1	1	2
11	Moldova	0	1	1	2
13	Kazakhstan	0	0	5	5
14	Belarus	0	0	3	3
15	Canada	0	0	2	2
15	Georgia	0	0	2	2
15	Hungary	0	0	2	2
18	North Korea	0	0	1	1
18	Serbia	0	0	1	1
Totals (19 entries)		21	21	42	84
