= Boxing at the 2013 Summer Universiade =

Boxing competitions

Boxing at the XXVII Summer Universiade
- Venue: Boxing Centre
- Dates: July 5, 2013 – July 10, 2013

Boxing was contested at the 2013 Summer Universiade from July 5 to 10 at the Boxing Centre in Kazan, Russia.

== Medal summary ==
=== Medal table ===
Rank	Nation	Gold	Silver	Bronze	Total
1	Russia (RUS)	6	2	0	8
2	Ukraine (UKR)	2	0	1	3
3	Uzbekistan (UZB)	1	4	3	8
4	Mongolia (MGL)	1	0	5	6
5	Kazakhstan (KAZ)	0	2	2	4
6	Armenia (ARM)	0	1	1	2
6	South Korea (KOR)	0	1	1	2
8	Belarus (BLR)	0	0	2	2
8	Moldova (MDA)	0	0	2	2
10	France (FRA)	0	0	1	1
10	Lithuania (LTU)	0	0	1	1
10	Turkey (TUR)	0	0	1	1
Totals (12 entries)		10	10	20	40

=== Men's events ===
Event	Gold	Silver	Bronze
Light flyweight (46-49 kg)	Hasanboy Dusmatov; Uzbekistan	Kim In-kyu; South Korea	Gankhuyagiin Gan-Erdene; Mongolia
Light flyweight (46-49 kg)	Hasanboy Dusmatov; Uzbekistan	Kim In-kyu; South Korea	Zhomart Yerzhan; Kazakhstan
Flyweight (52 kg)	Kharkhüügiin Enkh-Amar; Mongolia	Misha Aloyan; Russia	Jasurbek Latipov; Uzbekistan
Flyweight (52 kg)	Kharkhüügiin Enkh-Amar; Mongolia	Misha Aloyan; Russia	Alexandr Riscan; Moldova
Bantamweight (56 kg)	Sergey Vodopyanov; Russia	Rustam Rustamov; Kazakhstan	Henrik Mokoyan; Armenia
Bantamweight (56 kg)	Sergey Vodopyanov; Russia	Rustam Rustamov; Kazakhstan	Enkhjargalyn Iderkhüü; Mongolia
Lightweight (60 kg)	Adlan Abdurashidov; Russia	Fazliddin Gaibnazarov; Uzbekistan	Lee Sang-min; South Korea
Lightweight (60 kg)	Adlan Abdurashidov; Russia	Fazliddin Gaibnazarov; Uzbekistan	Dorjnyambuugiin Otgondalai; Mongolia
Light welterweight (64 kg)	Radzhab Butaev; Russia	Artur Kirajyan; Armenia	Denys Berinchyk; Ukraine
Light welterweight (64 kg)	Radzhab Butaev; Russia	Artur Kirajyan; Armenia	Dmitri Galagoț; Moldova
Welterweight (69 kg)	Andrey Zamkovoy; Russia	Hurshidbek Normatov; Uzbekistan	Onur Şipal; Turkey
Welterweight (69 kg)	Andrey Zamkovoy; Russia	Hurshidbek Normatov; Uzbekistan	Byambyn Tüvshinbat; Mongolia
Middleweight (75 kg)	Dmytro Mytrofanov; Ukraine	Azizbek Abdugofurov; Uzbekistan	Narmandakhyn Shinebayar; Mongolia
Middleweight (75 kg)	Dmytro Mytrofanov; Ukraine	Azizbek Abdugofurov; Uzbekistan	Nurdaulet Zharmanov; Kazakhstan
Light heavyweight (81 kg)	Oleksandr Hvozdyk; Ukraine	Dmitry Bivol; Russia	Mikhail Dauhaliavets; Belarus
Light heavyweight (81 kg)	Oleksandr Hvozdyk; Ukraine	Dmitry Bivol; Russia	Elshod Rasulov; Uzbekistan
Heavyweight (91 kg)	Evgeny Tishchenko; Russia	Rustam Tulaganov; Uzbekistan	Tadas Tamašauskas; Lithuania
Heavyweight (91 kg)	Evgeny Tishchenko; Russia	Rustam Tulaganov; Uzbekistan	Dylan Bregeon; France
Super heavyweight (+91 kg)	Magomed Omarov; Russia	Zhan Kossobutskiy; Kazakhstan	Mirzohidjon Abdullayev; Uzbekistan
Super heavyweight (+91 kg)	Magomed Omarov; Russia	Zhan Kossobutskiy; Kazakhstan	Yan Sudzilouski; Belarus
