= Belt wrestling at the 2013 Summer Universiade =

Belt wrestling at the XXVII Summer Universiade
- Venue: Ak Bars Wrestling Palace
- Dates: July 6, 2013 – July 9, 2013

Belt wrestling was contested at the 2013 Summer Universiade from July 6 to 9 at the Ak Bars Wrestling Palace in Kazan, Russia. Belt wrestling will be making its debut at the 2013 Summer Universiade.

== Medal summary ==
=== Medal table ===
Rank	Nation	Gold	Silver	Bronze	Total
1	Russia (RUS)*	12	3	4	19
2	Turkmenistan (TKM)	2	3	7	12
3	Kyrgyzstan (KGZ)	2	1	6	9
4	Mongolia (MGL)	1	1	4	6
5	Japan (JPN)	1	1	0	2
6	Israel (ISR)	1	0	1	2
7	Ukraine (UKR)	0	2	4	6
8	Kazakhstan (KAZ)	0	2	2	4
9	Belarus (BLR)	0	2	0	2
10	Moldova (MDA)	0	1	4	5
11	Uzbekistan (UZB)	0	1	3	4
12	Tajikistan (TJK)	0	1	2	3
13	Azerbaijan (AZE)	0	1	0	1
14	Latvia (LAT)	0	0	1	1
Totals (14 entries)		19	19	38	76

=== Men's events ===
==== Classic style ====
Event	Gold	Silver	Bronze
60 kg	Nafis Minnebaiev; Russia	Maxim Mamulat; Moldova	Nurzhan Ryskul Uulu; Kyrgyzstan
60 kg	Nafis Minnebaiev; Russia	Maxim Mamulat; Moldova	Otgon-Erdene Munkhbayar; Mongolia
70 kg	Ildar Giniyatullin; Russia	Agamyrat Orazsahedov; Turkmenistan	Kostiantyn Tarasov; Ukraine
70 kg	Ildar Giniyatullin; Russia	Agamyrat Orazsahedov; Turkmenistan	Mihail Cosnicean; Moldova
80 kg	Ilnar Galiev; Russia	Zaylobiddin Artikov; Uzbekistan	Dovran Yaylymov; Turkmenistan
80 kg	Ilnar Galiev; Russia	Zaylobiddin Artikov; Uzbekistan	Janis Rerihs; Latvia
90 kg	Ilnur Murtazin; Russia	Pavel Pradukha; Belarus	Duulatbek Saparbek Uulu; Kyrgyzstan
90 kg	Ilnur Murtazin; Russia	Pavel Pradukha; Belarus	Leonid Riabchun; Ukraine
100 kg	Renat Akhmetshin; Russia	Eskarkhan Oskanov; Kazakhstan	Anatolie Moldovan; Moldova
100 kg	Renat Akhmetshin; Russia	Eskarkhan Oskanov; Kazakhstan	Kadyr Kelsinbekov; Kyrgyzstan
+100 kg	Sergey Pavlik; Russia	Aliaksei Sobal; Belarus	Gregory Rudelson; Israel
+100 kg	Sergey Pavlik; Russia	Aliaksei Sobal; Belarus	Sugarjargal Boldpurev; Mongolia
Absolute	Sergey Pavlik; Russia	Ilnur Murtazin; Russia	Renat Akhmetshin; Russia
Absolute	Sergey Pavlik; Russia	Ilnur Murtazin; Russia	Ilnar Galiev; Russia

==== Freestyle ====
Event	Gold	Silver	Bronze
62 kg	Yagshmurat Annamyradov; Turkmenistan	Dmytro Kosenok; Ukraine	Gabdyzhalil Suleimanov; Russia
62 kg	Yagshmurat Annamyradov; Turkmenistan	Dmytro Kosenok; Ukraine	Ibodullo Aliberdizoda; Tajikistan
68 kg	Azamat Laipanov; Russia	Abduazim Boynazarov; Tajikistan	Begench Yagmyrov; Turkmenistan
68 kg	Azamat Laipanov; Russia	Abduazim Boynazarov; Tajikistan	Umer Belialov; Ukraine
75 kg	Alibek Lepshokov; Russia	Dimash Moldashev; Kazakhstan	Igor Besleaga; Moldova
75 kg	Alibek Lepshokov; Russia	Dimash Moldashev; Kazakhstan	Zaylobiddin Artikov; Uzbekistan
82 kg	Nurbek Kozhobekov; Kyrgyzstan	Gylych Jumayev; Turkmenistan	Ayan Yermekbayev; Kazakhstan
82 kg	Nurbek Kozhobekov; Kyrgyzstan	Gylych Jumayev; Turkmenistan	Arsen Tokov; Russia
90 kg	Alibek Khapaev; Russia	Seydi Batyrov; Turkmenistan	Kanimet Barpibekov; Kyrgyzstan
90 kg	Alibek Khapaev; Russia	Seydi Batyrov; Turkmenistan	Nozimjon Ibrohimjonov; Uzbekistan
100 kg	Nurbek Akanov; Kyrgyzstan	Anar Dorj; Mongolia	Hoshgeldi Hanaev; Turkmenistan
100 kg	Nurbek Akanov; Kyrgyzstan	Anar Dorj; Mongolia	Anatolie Moldovan; Moldova
+100 kg	Sugarjargal Boldpurev; Mongolia	Oleksandr Gordiienko; Ukraine	Myrat Jumayev; Turkmenistan
+100 kg	Sugarjargal Boldpurev; Mongolia	Oleksandr Gordiienko; Ukraine	Bekbolsun Kushubakov; Kyrgyzstan

=== Women's events ===
==== Freestyle ====
Event	Gold	Silver	Bronze
52 kg	Gulbadam Babamuratova; Turkmenistan	Ulviyya Kerimova; Azerbaijan	Zamira Akhmedova; Uzbekistan
52 kg	Gulbadam Babamuratova; Turkmenistan	Ulviyya Kerimova; Azerbaijan	Gulnur Yerbolova; Kazakhstan
58 kg	Serafima Safonova; Russia	Katsuki Sakagami; Japan	Rushana Nuzjavova; Turkmenistan
58 kg	Serafima Safonova; Russia	Katsuki Sakagami; Japan	Burul Alykulova; Kyrgyzstan
66 kg	Alice Schlesinger; Israel	Anna Emelyanenko; Russia	Enkhchimeg Sodnomsuren; Mongolia
66 kg	Alice Schlesinger; Israel	Anna Emelyanenko; Russia	Gulnar Hayitbayeva; Turkmenistan
76 kg	Rino Abe; Japan	Taisia Kireeva; Russia	Liudmyla Nikitina; Ukraine
76 kg	Rino Abe; Japan	Taisia Kireeva; Russia	Gulandom Qaroboeva; Tajikistan
+76 kg	Tatiana Zyryanova; Russia	Nagizel Sarbashova; Kyrgyzstan	Munkhtuya Dashnyam; Mongolia
+76 kg	Tatiana Zyryanova; Russia	Nagizel Sarbashova; Kyrgyzstan	Mahri Mulkiyeva; Turkmenistan

== See also ==
- 2013 in wrestling
