= Fencing at the 2013 Summer Universiade =

Fencing at the XXVII Summer Universiade
- Venues: Kazan Equestrian Complex Indoor Hall; Fencing Sport School
- Dates: July 6, 2013 – July 12, 2013

Fencing was contested at the 2013 Summer Universiade from July 6 to 12 at the Kazan Equestrian Complex Indoor Hall and the Fencing Sport School in Kazan, Russia.

== Medal summary ==
=== Medal table ===
* Host nation (Russia)

Rank	Nation	Gold	Silver	Bronze	Total
1	Russia (RUS)*	6	1	4	11
2	South Korea (KOR)	2	3	0	5
3	France (FRA)	2	0	3	5
4	China (CHN)	1	2	0	3
5	Ukraine (UKR)	1	0	2	3
6	Italy (ITA)	0	5	4	9
7	Kazakhstan (KAZ)	0	1	1	2
8	Netherlands (NED)	0	0	1	1
8	Poland (POL)	0	0	1	1
8	Romania (ROU)	0	0	1	1
8	Switzerland (SUI)	0	0	1	1
Totals (11 entries)		12	12	18	42

=== Men's events ===
Event	Gold	Silver	Bronze
Individual épée	Dong Chao; China	Ruslan Kurbanov; Kazakhstan	Max Heinzer; Switzerland
Individual épée	Dong Chao; China	Ruslan Kurbanov; Kazakhstan	Tristan Tulen; Netherlands
Individual sabre	Kamil Ibragimov; Russia	Luigi Angelo Miracco; Italy	Massimiliano Murolo; Italy
Individual sabre	Kamil Ibragimov; Russia	Luigi Angelo Miracco; Italy	Veniamin Reshetnikov; Russia
Individual foil	Aleksey Cheremisinov; Russia	Son Young-ki; South Korea	Edoardo Luperi; Italy
Individual foil	Aleksey Cheremisinov; Russia	Son Young-ki; South Korea	Daniele Garozzo; Italy
Team épée	France (FRA); Alexandre Blaszyck; Yannick Borel; Alex Fava; Daniel Jerent	China (CHN); Chen Yadong; Dong Chao; Jiang Chenyang; Li Hua	Kazakhstan (KAZ); Dmitriy Alexanin; Elmir Alimzhanov; Dmitriy Gryaznov; Ruslan Kurbanov
Team sabre	Russia (RUS); Kamil Ibragimov; Nikolay Kovalev; Nikita Proskura; Veniamin Reshetnikov	Italy (ITA); Francesco Darmiento; Luigi Angelo Miracco; Massimiliano Murolo; Riccardo Nuccio	France (FRA); Fabien Ballorca; Tristan Laurence; Romain Miramon Choy; Arthur Zatko
Team foil	Russia (RUS); Artur Akhmatkhuzin; Aleksey Cheremisinov; Renal Ganeyev; Aleksey Khovanskiy	Italy (ITA); Tobia Biondo; Alessio Foconi; Daniele Garozzo; Edoardo Luperi	France (FRA); Benoît Journet; Enzo Lefort; Vincent Simon; Jean-Paul Tony Helissey

=== Women's events ===
Event	Gold	Silver	Bronze
Individual épée	Shin A-lam; South Korea	Sun Yiwen; China	Marie-Florence Candassamy; France
Individual épée	Shin A-lam; South Korea	Sun Yiwen; China	Simona Pop; Romania
Individual sabre	Olha Kharlan; Ukraine	Kim Ji-yeon; South Korea	Yekaterina Dyachenko; Russia
Individual sabre	Olha Kharlan; Ukraine	Kim Ji-yeon; South Korea	Halyna Pundyk; Ukraine
Individual foil	Inna Deriglazova; Russia	Larisa Korobeynikova; Russia	Alice Volpi; Italy
Individual foil	Inna Deriglazova; Russia	Larisa Korobeynikova; Russia	Diana Yakovleva; Russia
Team épée	France (FRA); Marie-Florence Candassamy; Joséphine Coquin; Auriane Mallo; Lauren Rembi	South Korea (KOR); Choi Eun-sook; Choi In-jeong; Shin A-lam	Ukraine (UKR); Anastasiya Ivchenko; Olena Kryvytska; Kseniya Pantelyeyeva; Anfisa Pochkalova
Team sabre	South Korea (KOR); Kim Ji-yeon; Lee Ra-jin; Lee Woo-ree	Italy (ITA); Benedetta Baldini; Martina Petraglia; Lucrezia Sinigaglia; Loreta Maria Gulotta	Russia (RUS); Yekaterina Dyachenko; Yana Egorian; Dina Galiakbarova; Yuliya Gavrilova
Team foil	Russia (RUS); Yulia Biryukova; Inna Deriglazova; Larisa Korobeynikova; Diana Yakovleva	Italy (ITA); Valentina de Costanzo; Francesca Palumbo; Alice Volpi; Martina Batini	Poland (POL); Marta Lyczbinska; Monika Paliszewska; Emilia Rygielska; Martyna Synoradzka
