= Ukraine at the 2013 Summer Universiade =

- IOC code: UKR

in Kazan 6 — 17 July 2013
- Competitors: 361 in 22 sports
- Medals Ranked 6th: Gold 12 Silver 28 Bronze 36 Total 76

Summer Universiade appearances (overview)
- 1993; 1995; 1997; 1999; 2001; 2003; 2005; 2007; 2009; 2011; 2013; 2015; 2017; 2019; 2021; 2025; 2027

Ukraine competed at the 2013 Summer Universiade in Kazan, Russia, from 6 July to 17 July 2013. 361 athletes formed the Ukrainian team that was second largest (after the Russian).

Ukraine won 76 medals (4th by number after Russia, Japan, and China), including 12 gold medals (6th place).

Svitlana Shmidt who originally won silver in women's 3000 metres steeplechase was stripped of her medal due to doping offences.

== Competitors ==
Ukraine was represented by 361 athletes in 22 sports. Ukraine was not represented in beach volleyball, diving, synchronised swimming, and water polo.

Sport	Men	Women	Total
Athletics	10	11	21
Badminton	3	3	6
Basketball	12	12	24
Belt wrestling	13	3	16
Boxing	10	—N/a	10
Canoeing	15	6	21
Chess	3	4	7
Fencing	12	8	20
Field hockey	18	—	18
Football	20	—	20
Gymnastics	5	13	18
Judo	8	8	16
Rowing	20	11	31
Rugby sevens	12	12	24
Sambo	9	9	18
Shooting	6	10	16
Swimming	14	7	21
Table tennis	4	5	9
Tennis	2	1	3
Volleyball	12	—	12
Weightlifting	6	3	9
Wrestling	14	7	21
Total	228	133	361

== Medal summary ==
=== Medal by sports ===
Medals by sport
Sport	1st place, gold medalist(s)	2nd place, silver medalist(s)	3rd place, bronze medalist(s)	Total
Athletics	4	4	0	8
Shooting	2	1	1	4
Boxing	2	0	1	3
Rowing	1	4	3	8
Swimming	1	2	2	5
Canoeing	1	2	0	3
Fencing	1	0	2	3
Sambo	0	5	2	7
Wrestling	0	3	7	10
Rhythmic gymnastics	0	3	6	9
Belt wrestling	0	2	4	6
Artistic gymnastics	0	1	5	6
Judo	0	1	3	4
Total	12	28	36	76

=== Medalists ===
Medal	Name	Sport	Event	Date
Gold	Ruslan Perestiuk; Serhiy Smelyk; Ihor Bodrov; Vitaliy Korzh	Athletics	Men's 4 × 100 metres relay	12 July
Gold	Viktor Kuznyetsov	Athletics	Men's triple jump	9 July
Gold	Hanna Titimets	Athletics	Women's 400 metres hurdles	9 July
Gold	Olesya Povh; Nataliya Pohrebnyak; Mariya Ryemyen; Viktoriya Piatachenko	Athletics	Women's 4 × 100 metres relay	12 July
Gold	Dmytro Mytrofanov	Boxing	Men's middleweight	
Gold	Oleksandr Hvozdyk	Boxing	Men's light heavyweight	
Gold	Vitaliy Vergeles; Denys Kamerylov; Dmytro Ianchuk; Eduard Shemetylo	Canoeing	Men's C-4 1000 m	
Gold	Olha Kharlan	Fencing	Women's individual sabre	
Gold	Nataliya Dovhodko	Rowing	Women's single sculls	
Gold	Yuriy Nikandrov	Shooting	Men's trap	
Gold	Olena Kostevych	Shooting	Women's 25 m pistol	
Gold	Andriy Hovorov	Swimming	Men's 50 m butterfly	
Silver	Ruslan Dmytrenko	Athletics	Men's 20 kilometres walk	9 July
Silver	Ruslan Dmytrenko; Igor Glavan; Nazar Kovalenko; Ivan Losyev	Athletics	Men's 20 kilometres walk team	9 July
Silver	Andriy Protsenko	Athletics	Men's high jump	9 July
Silver	Hanna Yaroshchuk	Athletics	Women's 400 metres hurdles	9 July
Silver	Dmytro Kosenok	Belt wrestling	Men's freestyle 60 kg	
Silver	Oleksandr Gordiienko	Belt wrestling	Men's freestyle +100 kg	
Silver	Vitaliy Vergeles; Denys Kamerylov; Dmytro Ianchuk; Eduard Shemetylo	Canoeing	Men's C-4 500 m	
Silver	Ievgen Karabuta; Maksym Bilchenko; Oleksandr Senkevych; Igor Trunov	Canoeing	Men's K-4 200 m	
Silver	Petro Pakhnyuk; Maksym Semiankiv; Oleh Vernyayev; Oleh Stepko; Ihor Radivilov	Gymnastics	Men's team all-around	
Silver	Alina Maksymenko	Gymnastics	Women's rhythmic gymnastics individual clubs	
Silver	Ganna Rizatdinova	Gymnastics	Women's rhythmic gymnastics individual clubs	
Silver	Olena Dmytrash; Yevgeniya Gomon; Oleksandra Gridasova; Valeria Gudym; Viktoria Mazur; Svitlana Prokopova	Gymnastics	Women's rhythmic gymnastics group all-around	
Silver	Shushana Hevondian	Judo	Women's lightweight	
Silver	Ivan Dovhodko; Oleksandr Nadtoka	Rowing	Men's double sculls	
Silver	Ihor Khmara; Stanislav Kovalov	Rowing	Men's lightweight double sculls	
Silver	Anton Kholyaznykov; Viktor Hrebennikov	Rowing	Men's coxless pair	
Silver	Denys Chornyi; Stanislav Chumraiev; Vitalii Tsurkan; Vasyl Zavgorodnii; Ivan Yurchenko; Ivan Futryk; Dmytro Mikhay; Anatolii Radchenko; Vladyslav Nikulin	Rowing	Men's eight	
Silver	Razmik Tonoyan	Sambo	Men's +100 kg	
Silver	Olena Kunytska	Sambo	Women's 48 kg	
Silver	Inna Cherniak	Sambo	Women's 52 kg	
Silver	Olena Sayko	Sambo	Women's 60 kg	
Silver	Luiza Gainutdinova	Sambo	Women's 68 kg	
Silver	Olena Kostevych; Kateryna Domkina; Marta Boichuk	Shooting	Women's 25 m pistol team	
Silver	Serhiy Frolov	Swimming	Men's 800 m freestyle	
Silver	Daryna Zevina	Swimming	Women's 200 m backstroke	
Silver	Pavlo Oliynyk	Wrestling	Men's freestyle 96 kg	
Silver	Oleksandr Khotsianivskyi	Wrestling	Men's freestyle 120 kg	
Silver	Iryna Husyak	Wrestling	Women's 55 kg	
Bronze	Kostiantyn Tarasov	Belt wrestling	Men's classic style 70 kg	
Bronze	Leonid Riabchun	Belt wrestling	Men's classic style 90 kg	
Bronze	Umer Belialov	Belt wrestling	Men's freestyle 68 kg	
Bronze	Liudmyla Nikitina	Belt wrestling	Women's freestyle 76 kg	
Bronze	Denys Berinchyk	Boxing	Men's light welterweight	
Bronze	Halyna Pundyk	Fencing	Women's individual sabre	
Bronze	Anastasiya Ivchenko; Olena Kryvytska; Kseniya Pantelyeyeva; Anfisa Pochkalova	Fencing	Women's team épée	
Bronze	Oleh Vernyayev	Gymnastics	Men's individual all-around	
Bronze	Oleh Stepko	Gymnastics	Men's pommel horse	
Bronze	Ihor Radivilov	Gymnastics	Men's rings	
Bronze	Ihor Radivilov	Gymnastics	Men's vault	
Bronze	Oleh Vernyayev	Gymnastics	Men's parallel bars	
Bronze	Ganna Rizatdinova	Gymnastics	Women's rhythmic gymnastics individual all-around	
Bronze	Alina Maksymenko	Gymnastics	Women's rhythmic gymnastics individual hoop	
Bronze	Ganna Rizatdinova	Gymnastics	Women's rhythmic gymnastics individual hoop	
Bronze	Ganna Rizatdinova	Gymnastics	Women's rhythmic gymnastics individual ball	
Bronze	Olena Dmytrash; Yevgeniya Gomon; Oleksandra Gridasova; Valeria Gudym; Viktoria Mazur; Svitlana Prokopova	Gymnastics	Women's rhythmic gymnastics group 10 clubs	
Bronze	Olena Dmytrash; Yevgeniya Gomon; Oleksandra Gridasova; Valeria Gudym; Viktoria Mazur; Svitlana Prokopova	Gymnastics	Women's rhythmic gymnastics group 3 balls + 2 ribbons	
Bronze	Artem Kharchenko	Judo	Men's featherweight	
Bronze	Maryna Cherniak	Judo	Men's bantamweight	
Bronze	Yelyzaveta Kalanina	Judo	Women's open weight	
Bronze	Serhiy Humennyy	Rowing	Men's single sculls	
Bronze	Anna Kravchenko; Olena Buryak	Rowing	Women's double sculls	
Bronze	Kateryna Sheremet; Ilona Romanesku; Ievgeniia Nimchenko; Daryna Verkhohliad	Rowing	Women's coxless four	
Bronze	Mykhailo Ilytchuk	Sambo	Men's 57 kg	
Bronze	Mykhailo Cherkasov	Sambo	Men's 100 kg	
Bronze	Dariya Sharipova; Ievgeniia Borysova; Tetiana Tarasenko	Shooting	Women's 50 metre rifle prone team	
Bronze	Andriy Hovorov	Swimming	Men's 50 m freestyle	
Bronze	Serhiy Frolov	Swimming	Men's 1500 m freestyle	
Bronze	Dmytro Pyshkov	Wrestling	Men's Greco-Roman 74 kg	
Bronze	Zhan Beleniuk	Wrestling	Men's Greco-Roman 84 kg	
Bronze	Vasyl Shuptar	Wrestling	Men's freestyle 60 kg	
Bronze	Semen Radulov	Wrestling	Men's freestyle 66 kg	
Bronze	Mariya Livach	Wrestling	Women's 48 kg	
Bronze	Yuliya Blahinya	Wrestling	Women's 51 kg	
Bronze	Alina Stadnik	Wrestling	Women's 67 kg	

== See also ==
- Ukraine at the 2013 Winter Universiade
