= 2013 Summer Universiade =

Multi-sport event in Kazan, Russia

XXVII Summer Universiade
- Host city: Kazan, Russia
- Nations: 162
- Athletes: 7.996
- Events: 351 in 27 sports
- Opening: 6 July 2013
- Closing: 17 July 2013
- Opened by: President Vladimir Putin
- Athlete's Oath: Aliya Mustafina
- Judge's Oath: Yevgeny Sadovyi
- Torch lighter: Yekaterina Gamova, Irek Zaripov, Nail Yakupov and Tagir Khaibulaev
- Main venue: Kazan Arena
- Website: kazan2013.com (archived)

Summer

Winter

Swimming 4 × 200 m men's freestyle final

The 2013 Summer Universiade, officially known as the XXVII Summer Universiade (Russian: XXVII Летняя Универсиада), was held in the city of Kazan, Russia, the most northerly city ever to host a Summer Universiade. Over 10,400 university athletes from 162 countries participated in 13 mandatory and 14 optional sports, making the 2013 Universiade the biggest ever in the history of the event. For the first time in history a Cultural Universiade was also included, with many festivals and shows held simultaneously with the sporting events. The Universiade was organized by the International University Sports Federation (FISU) and by the authorities of the Russian Federation.

== Bidding process ==
Kazan had bid twice for the Universiade; the first attempt was for the 2011 Summer Universiade, but Kazan lost to Shenzhen by just two votes. The city was the only bidder for the 2013 Summer Universiade, and was acclaimed as host city by FISU.

== The games ==
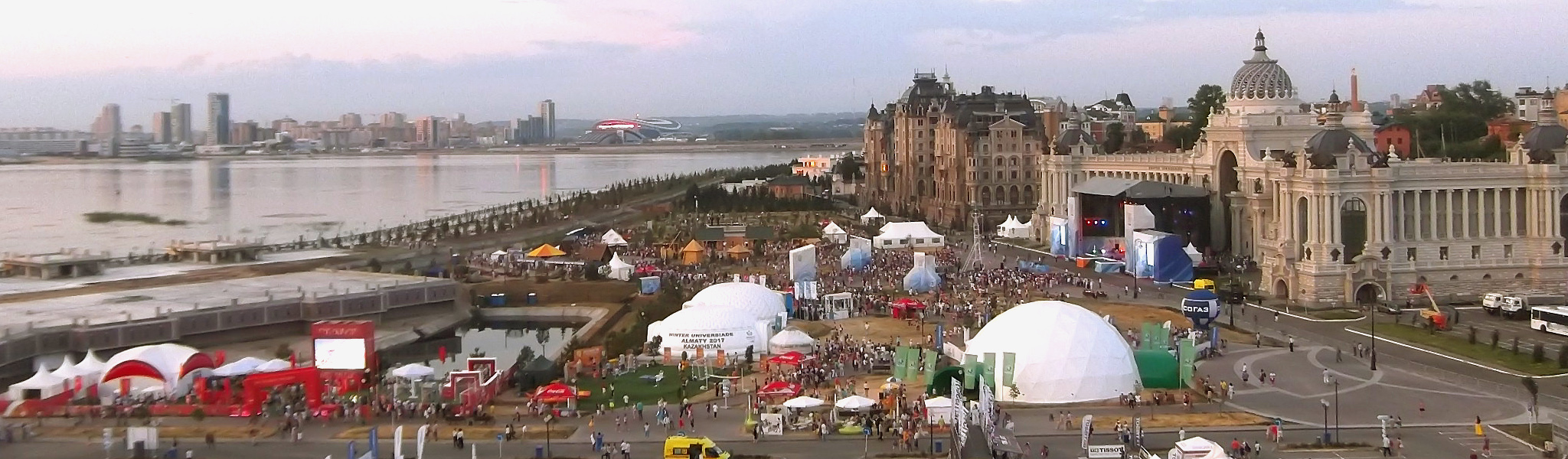
Park of the Cultural Universiade

=== Transportation ===
Prior to the Universiade, Kazan International Airport was totally rebuilt as a hub, the new Kazan-2 transit rail-bus terminal was built, the old Kazan-1 rail terminal was rebuilt, and the fast rail aeroexpress with Siemens trains was inaugurated between the Kazan-1 rail terminal downtown and the airport.

Zones of activity of the Universiade were connected by renewed highways with two-level flyovers, including the completed "Big Kazan Ring" with a new LRT (fast tram). In addition, a Kremlin bridge over the Kazanka River was rebuilt. The key transportation connector to the sporting and other venues from the Universiade Village was the Kazan Metro (subway) that had been built in 2005 and was expanded before the Universiade.

A large part of design works was carried out by JSC Institute Tatdorproject (autoroads, pedestrian crosses, transport junctions), Roszheldorproject (arrangement of intermodal transportation), Energoprojekt (reconstruction of Kazan International Airport), etc.

The Cultural Universiade was held in the Cultural Park at Palace Square downtown near the Kazan Kremlin, at various theatres and performance venues in the Kremlin, and at other places throughout the city.

=== Venues ===
A total of 27 new stadia were built as venues for the event. The Games used 64 venues in all, 36 of which were constructed specifically for the 2013 Summer Universiade. The 64 venues were concentrated in 4 zones across the city of Kazan. These included the area of Pobeda Avenue with the Kazan Area, the Aquatics Palace of Water Sports, the Combat Sports (Boxing) Palace, and the area of Orenburgsky Trakt where the Universiade Village was located, as well as the Tennis Academy and Gymnastics Palace. In addition, many sports venues for training functions were located elsewhere in Zarechye (Novo-Savinovsky and Airbuilders districts), and some of them in downtown Kazan.

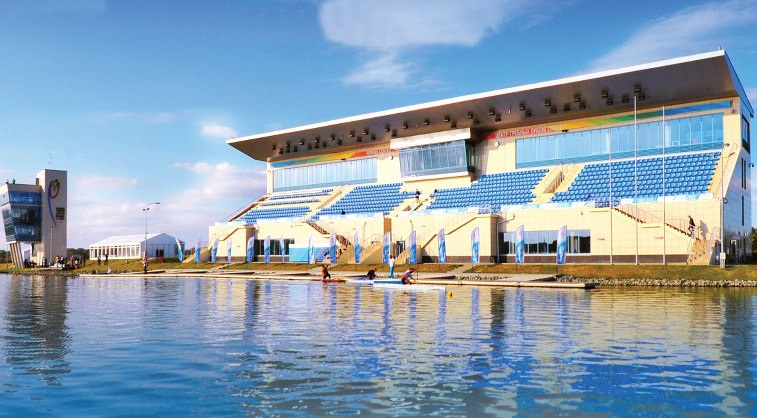
Rowing Center

Venue	Sports	Seats	Year opened
Kazan Arena	opening and closing ceremonies	45,000	2013
Central Stadium	athletics, football	26,920	1960
TatNeft Arena	volleyball	10,000	2005
Basket-Hall Arena	basketball	7,500	2003
Tennis Academy	tennis, badminton	7,200	2010
Kazan Hippodrome	beach volleyball	6,000	2005
«Sankt Peterburg» volleyball centre	volleyball	4,600	2010
Aquatics Palace	swimming, diving, synchronised swimming	4,200	2012
Rowing Centre	rowing	3,000	2011
USC «Tolar»	volleyball, rugby	3,000 and 1,000	2009
Field Hockey Centre	field hockey	2,400	2007
«Ak Bars» combat sports palace	judo, kurash, sambo	2,000	2010
Boxing and Table tennis centre	boxing, table tennis	2,000	2010
SC «KAI-Olymp»	football, basketball, water polo	1,500 and 1,000	2010
SC «Bustan»	volleyball, swimming	1,500 and 1,000	2010
USC «Zilant»	volleyball	1,000	2009
USC «Miras»	football, basketball	1,000	2010
«Burevestnik» swimming pool	water polo	1,000	2010
USC «Olympiets»	volleyball	700	2010
«Akcharlak» swimming pool	swimming	500	2010
SC «Forward»	basketball	296	2009
OSC «Triumph»	basketball, volleyball	296	2010
OSC «Vatan»	basketball, volleyball	296	2010
USC «Moskva»	volleyball		2010
USC «Tezuche»	volleyball		2010
SC «Itil»	basketball		2009
SC «Ak Bure»	water polo		2010
SC «Batyr»			1987

=== Universiade Village ===
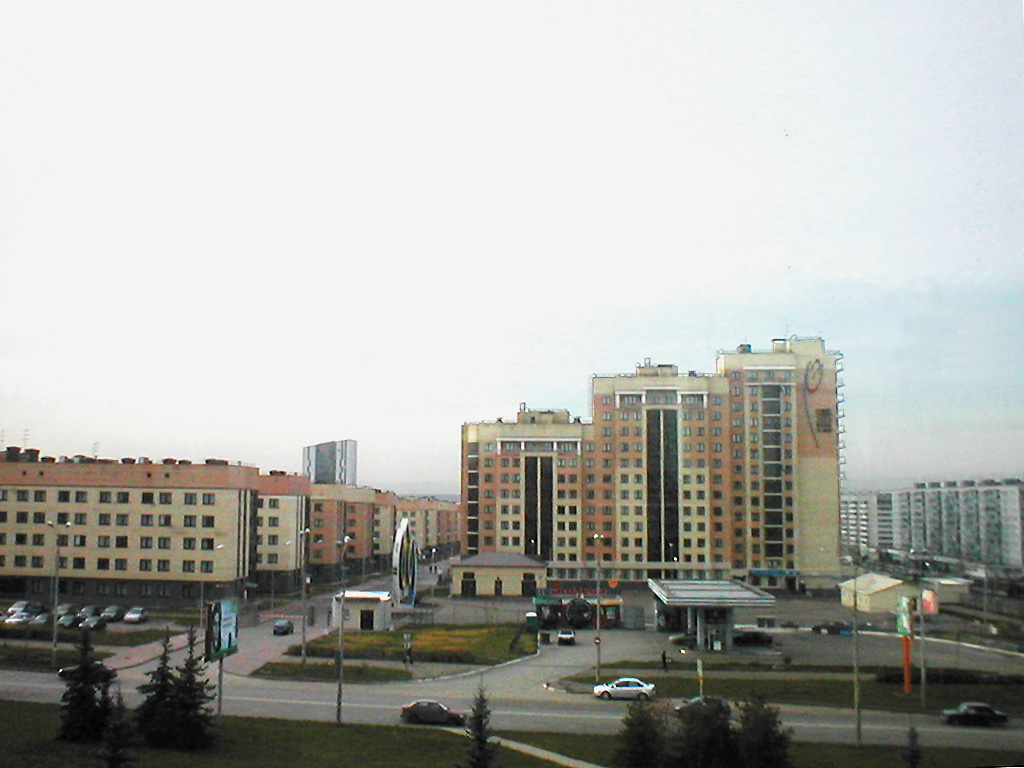
The Universiade Village

The Universiade Village is a residential neighborhood for 14,500 residents that was constructed within the Kazan Federal University campus to house competitors and officials during the Kazan 2013 Summer Universiade. Nearly 400 sporting and cultural events have been staged on the campus since it opened its doors in 2010. Shortly after the first move-in phase, an open-air step aerobics marathon was held that brought together up to 1,000 Universiade Village residents. The campus had already hosted football, volleyball, and chess championships that can rightfully be called 'international' as a number of international students competed in them.

=== Torch relay ===
The length of the relay was about 104,000 kilometers, and 2,013 torchbearers were enlisted to participate in the relay. After touring through 51 cities on five continents, the torch arrived in Vladivostok on 24 January, and on 25 January, the Russian leg of the Universiade torch relay began. The Russian section of the Universiade Torch Relay was held between January and July 2013. The Universiade Torch Relay celebrations took place in 30 cities across Russia, as well as 44 cities and towns of municipal districts of Tatarstan. The torch arrived at the Kazan Arena on the night of 6 July for the lighting of the cauldron at the Opening Ceremony.

=== Medals ===
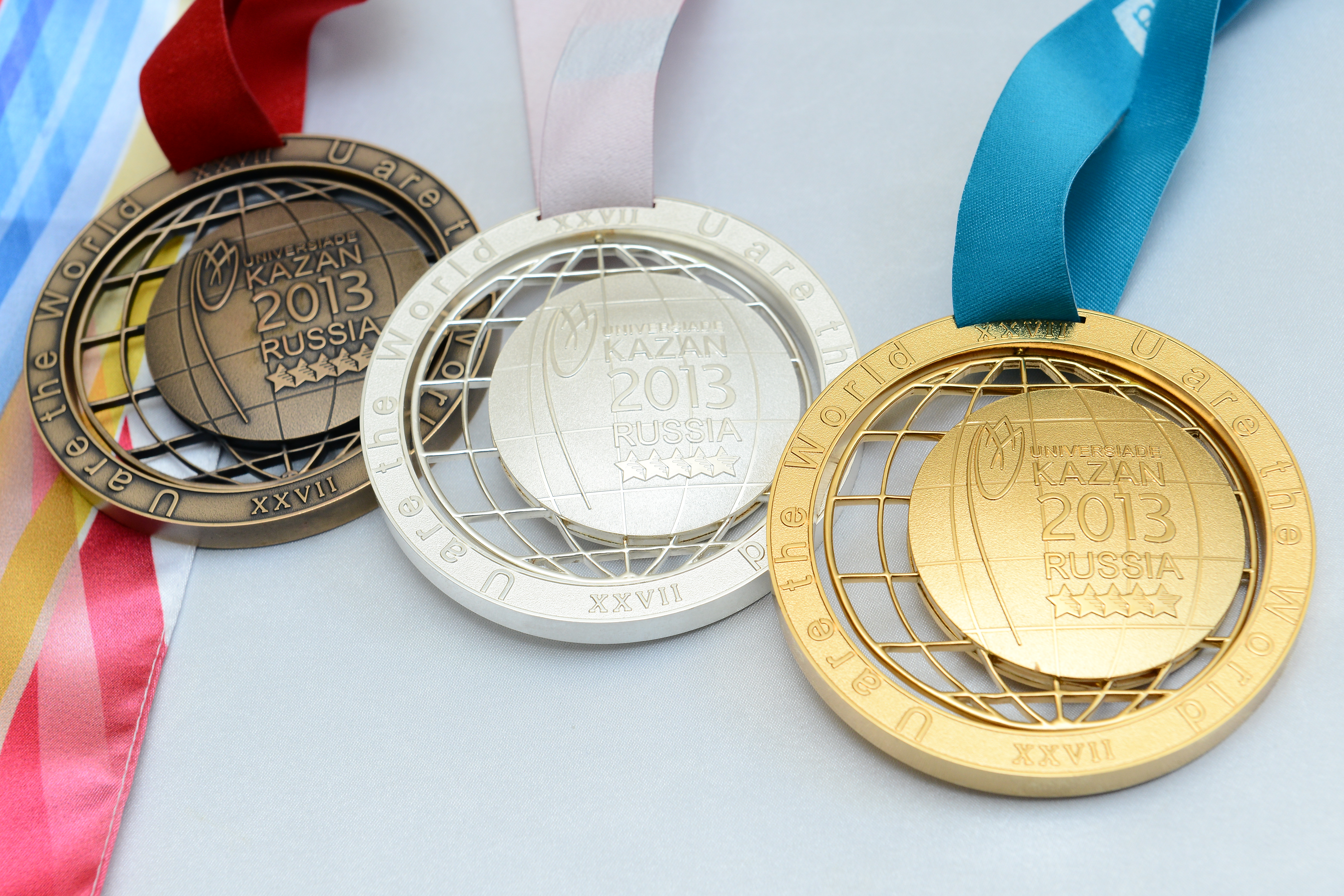
Medals

A total of 351 sets of medals were distributed during the two weeks of the competition. The medal design featured a globe emblazoned with the emblem and logo of the Universiade, and surrounded by a circle featuring the slogan of the Universiade.

=== Opening and closing ceremonies ===
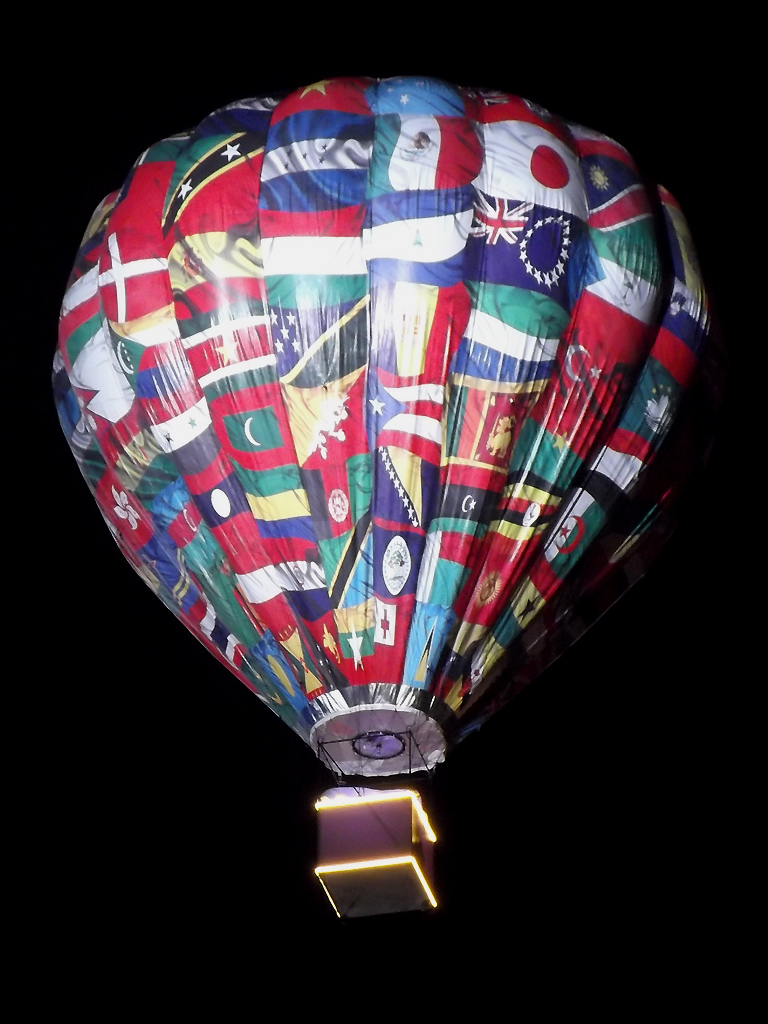
Flags of participating nations on balloon at closing ceremony

The 2013 Summer Universiade opening and closing ceremonies were held on 6 and 17 July 2013, with Russian President Vladimir Putin and Premier Dmitry Medvedev in attendance accordingly. The ceremonies took place in the new Kazan Arena stadium with a seating capacity of 45,000 people.

Notable songs performed during the opening ceremony, composed by Igor Krutoy include:

- White Bird – Aida Garifullina
- The Cradle – Yana Melikaeva
- Reflection (also known as Ti amo cosi) – Albina Shagimuratova, Ildar Abdrazakov
- Memory (also known as Credo) – Ekaterina Scherbachenko
- The Path (also known as La via) – Dmitri Hvorostovsky
- Towards (also known as Forse non fu) – Alexander Gradsky, Maria Maksakova Jr.

In the handover segment of the closing ceremony, the Korean branch of the boy group EXO performed their hit song "Wolf", the title track from their first full-length album XOXO, at the closing ceremony while Russian artists such as Serebro and Zemfira made a huge show.

=== Sports ===
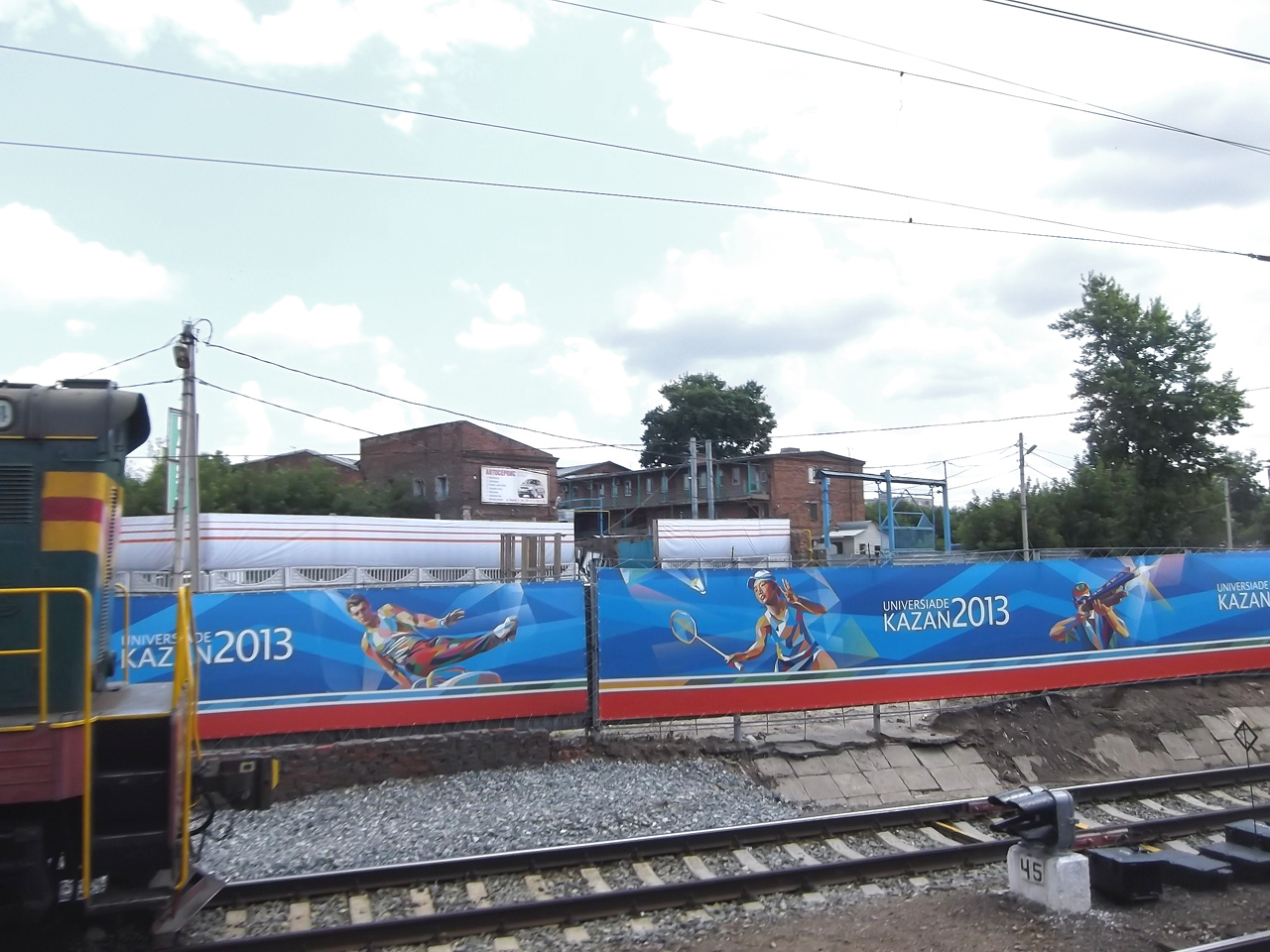
The sports at street playbill

For the first time in the history of the Universiades, twenty-seven sports were included in Kazan 2013.

The optional sports chosen were badminton, beach volleyball, belt wrestling, boxing, canoeing, chess, field hockey, rugby sevens, sambo, shooting, synchronised swimming, rowing, weightlifting, and wrestling. Of the optional sports chosen, belt wrestling, boxing, sambo, rugby sevens, and synchronised swimming made their debut at the 2013 Summer Universiade.

- Aquatics
  - Diving (12)
  - Marathon swimming (2)
  - Swimming (40)
  - Synchronised swimming (4)
  - Water polo (2)
- Athletics (50)
- Badminton (6)
- Basketball (2)
- Beach volleyball (2)
- Belt wrestling (19)
- Boxing (10)
- Canoeing (24)
- Chess (3)
- Fencing (12)
- Field hockey (2)
- Football (2)
- Gymnastics
  - Artistic gymnastics (14)
  - Rhythmic gymnastics (8)
- Judo (18)
- Rowing (13)
- Rugby sevens (2)
- Sambo (18)
- Shooting (34)
- Table tennis (7)
- Tennis (7)
- Volleyball (2)
- Weightlifting (15)
- Wrestling (21)

=== Participants ===
A total of 162 nations were officially entered prior to the opening ceremony. In the list below, the number of athletes from each nation is given in parentheses. The largest national teams were from Russia, Ukraine, Canada, the U.S., Poland, Japan and China.

- Albania (2)
- Algeria (1)
- American Samoa (2)
- Andorra (1)
- Angola (4)
- Anguilla (3)
- Argentina (24)
- Armenia (42)
- Aruba (2)
- Australia (152)
- Austria (34)
- Azerbaijan (81)
- Bahamas (4)
- Bangladesh (2)
- Barbados (2)
- Belarus (163)
- Belgium (51)
- Benin (2)
- Bermuda (4)
- Bosnia and Herzegovina (2)
- Botswana (29)
- Brazil (222)
- Bulgaria (25)
- Burkina Faso (2)
- Burundi (2)
- Cameroon (2)
- Canada (311)
- Central African Republic (2)
- Chad (2)
- Chile (60)
- China (293)
- Colombia (30)
- Comoros (2)
- Republic of the Congo (8)
- Costa Rica (6)
- Croatia (10)
- Cuba (6)
- Curaçao (2)
- Cyprus (9)
- Czech Republic (162)
- Denmark (15)
- Djibouti (1)
- Dominican Republic (6)
- Democratic Republic of the Congo (3)
- Ecuador (2)
- Egypt (45)
- El Salvador (4)
- Estonia (126)
- Ethiopia (3)
- Federated States of Micronesia (2)
- Fiji (2)
- Finland (84)
- France (214)
- Georgia (74)
- Germany (154)
- Ghana (20)
- Great Britain (119)
- Greece (13)
- Guatemala (6)
- Guinea (2)
- Guinea-Bissau (1)
- Haiti (2)
- Honduras (2)
- Hong Kong (63)
- Hungary (130)
- Iceland (1)
- India (34)
- Indonesia (37)
- Iran (28)
- Ireland (56)
- Israel (40)
- Italy (245)
- Ivory Coast (2)
- Jamaica (10)
- Japan (415)
- Jordan (2)
- Kazakhstan (169)
- Kenya (8)
- Kyrgyzstan (91)
- Latvia (102)
- Lebanon (23)
- Lesotho (1)
- Liechtenstein (3)
- Lithuania (94)
- Luxembourg (6)
- Macau (50)
- Macedonia (4)
- Madagascar (5)
- Malawi (2)
- Malaysia (120)
- Maldives (1)
- Mali (17)
- Malta (7)
- Mexico (167)
- Moldova (54)
- Monaco (2)
- Mongolia (133)
- Montenegro (15)
- Mozambique (2)
- Namibia (23)
- Netherlands (20)
- Nepal (9)
- New Zealand (38)
- Nicaragua (2)
- Niger (3)
- Nigeria (12)
- Northern Mariana Islands (2)
- North Korea (30)
- Norway (84)
- Oman (33)
- Pakistan (27)
- Palestine (3)
- Panama (3)
- Paraguay (5)
- Peru (22)
- Philippines (89)
- Poland (275)
- Portugal (31)
- Puerto Rico (2)
- Qatar (23)
- Romania (103)
- Russia (672) (host)
- Rwanda (2)
- Samoa (1)
- San Marino (1)
- Senegal (9)
- Serbia (52)
- Seychelles (2)
- Sierra Leone (21)
- Singapore (43)
- Slovakia (72)
- Slovenia (28)
- Somalia (1)
- South Africa (121)
- South Korea (239)
- Spain (46)
- Sri Lanka (55)
- Suriname (4)
- Swaziland (2)
- Sweden (60)
- Switzerland (70)
- Syria (1)
- Chinese Taipei (136)
- Tajikistan (68)
- Tanzania (2)
- Thailand (82)
- Togo (2)
- Trinidad and Tobago (2)
- Tunisia (2)
- Turkey (82)
- Turkmenistan (82)
- Uganda (25)
- Ukraine (363)
- United Arab Emirates (35)
- United States (290)
- Uruguay (21)
- Uzbekistan (58)
- Venezuela (4)
- Vietnam (15)
- Virgin Islands (6)
- Zambia (13)
- Zimbabwe (16)

=== Medal table ===
From the official website's medal tally information:

In April 2014, Roxana Bârcă from Romania, started a two-year doping ban for the use of Methasterone, and lost the gold medal at the Women's 5000 metres. The ban lasted from 11 July 2013 to 3 September 2015.

On 8 August 2016, the International Weightlifting Federation announced the disqualification of several athletes who participated in the competition due to the retesting of the anti-doping exams, with which several medals are redistributed.

On 18 May 2017, the rankings of the Women's Heptathlon and 1,500m were updated further to the suspension of two Russian female athletes by the Court of Arbitration for Sport (CAS) and the medal table was updated.

On 13 November 2020, the rankings of the Women's 3000m steeplechase were updated further due to the suspension of two Russians, one Ukrainian and one Turkish female athletes by the Court of Arbitration for Sport (CAS).

On 12 August 2022, the results of Russian Irina Tarasova between July 2012 and July 2016 were annulled by the Athletics Integrity Unit for doping violations. This means that her gold medal in the women's shot put has been stripped.

On 9 September 2023, the Court of Arbitration for Sport annulled the results from Tatiana Kashirina who won the gold medal in the +75kg event in Weightlifting over four years of her results due to drugs offenses, stating, "All the competitive results obtained by Tatiana Kashirina from 1 April 2013 until 19 June 2017 were disqualified, with all the resulting consequences, including the forfeiture of any titles, awards, medals, points and prize and appearance money".

Rank	Nation	Gold	Silver	Bronze	Total
1	Russia (RUS)*	150	72	60	282
2	China (CHN)	28	27	23	78
3	Japan (JPN)	24	29	33	86
4	South Korea (KOR)	17	14	12	43
5	Belarus (BLR)	13	13	16	42
6	Ukraine (UKR)	12	28	36	76
7	United States (USA)	11	15	14	40
8	South Africa (RSA)	7	5	2	14
9	Italy (ITA)	6	17	22	45
10	Australia (AUS)	6	4	6	16
11	Lithuania (LTU)	6	1	4	11
12	France (FRA)	5	10	11	26
13	Poland (POL)	5	9	16	30
14	Germany (GER)	4	6	9	19
15	Chinese Taipei (TPE)	4	4	7	15
16	Hungary (HUN)	4	3	9	16
17	Brazil (BRA)	4	3	4	11
18	Mongolia (MGL)	3	6	17	26
19	Thailand (THA)	3	6	7	16
20	Canada (CAN)	3	5	9	17
20	Czech Republic (CZE)	3	5	9	17
22	Azerbaijan (AZE)	3	4	7	14
23	North Korea (PRK)	3	2	2	7
24	Kazakhstan (KAZ)	2	10	16	28
25	Uzbekistan (UZB)	2	7	10	19
26	Iran (IRI)	2	4	3	9
27	Turkmenistan (TKM)	2	3	10	15
28	Kyrgyzstan (KGZ)	2	2	9	13
29	Israel (ISR)	2	1	1	4
30	Turkey (TUR)	2	0	5	7
31	Portugal (POR)	2	0	2	4
32	Armenia (ARM)	1	5	5	11
33	Mexico (MEX)	1	4	6	11
34	Slovakia (SVK)	1	3	2	6
35	Cuba (CUB)	1	2	2	5
36	Great Britain (GBR)	1	1	4	6
36	Romania (ROU)	1	1	4	6
38	Austria (AUT)	1	0	3	4
39	Latvia (LAT)	1	0	2	3
40	Belgium (BEL)	1	0	1	2
41	Botswana (BOT)	1	0	0	1
41	Philippines (PHI)	1	0	0	1
41	Virgin Islands (ISV)	1	0	0	1
44	Moldova (MDA)	0	2	10	12
45	Tajikistan (TJK)	0	2	3	5
46	Serbia (SRB)	0	1	8	9
47	Bulgaria (BUL)	0	1	3	4
47	Jamaica (JAM)	0	1	3	4
49	Argentina (ARG)	0	1	1	2
49	Finland (FIN)	0	1	1	2
49	Georgia (GEO)	0	1	1	2
49	Spain (ESP)	0	1	1	2
53	Albania (ALB)	0	1	0	1
53	Chile (CHI)	0	1	0	1
53	India (IND)	0	1	0	1
53	Indonesia (INA)	0	1	0	1
53	Ireland (IRL)	0	1	0	1
53	Kenya (KEN)	0	1	0	1
53	Madagascar (MAD)	0	1	0	1
53	Senegal (SEN)	0	1	0	1
61	Malaysia (MAS)	0	0	3	3
62	Netherlands (NED)	0	0	2	2
62	Switzerland (SUI)	0	0	2	2
64	Croatia (CRO)	0	0	1	1
64	Egypt (EGY)	0	0	1	1
64	Estonia (EST)	0	0	1	1
64	Greece (GRE)	0	0	1	1
64	Ivory Coast (CIV)	0	0	1	1
64	New Zealand (NZL)	0	0	1	1
64	Slovenia (SLO)	0	0	1	1
64	Venezuela (VEN)	0	0	1	1
Totals (71 entries)		352	350	466	1,168

- Record (*)

Russia got almost half of gold medals and more than a quarter of all medals. This is more than any other nation in this games and in the history of Universiades. The media explained this by the fact that the Russian team featured nineteen reigning Olympic champions, who were all listed as students, more than all other teams taken together, in an apparent attempt to make a good impression in Russian language media. There were 67 Universiade records, 38 of them set by Russian athletes.

On 19 July 2013, Vladimir Putin congratulated Russian athletes, and responded to criticism by saying that all critics of Russia's [calling it USSR] achievements should take Viagra.

=== Schedule ===
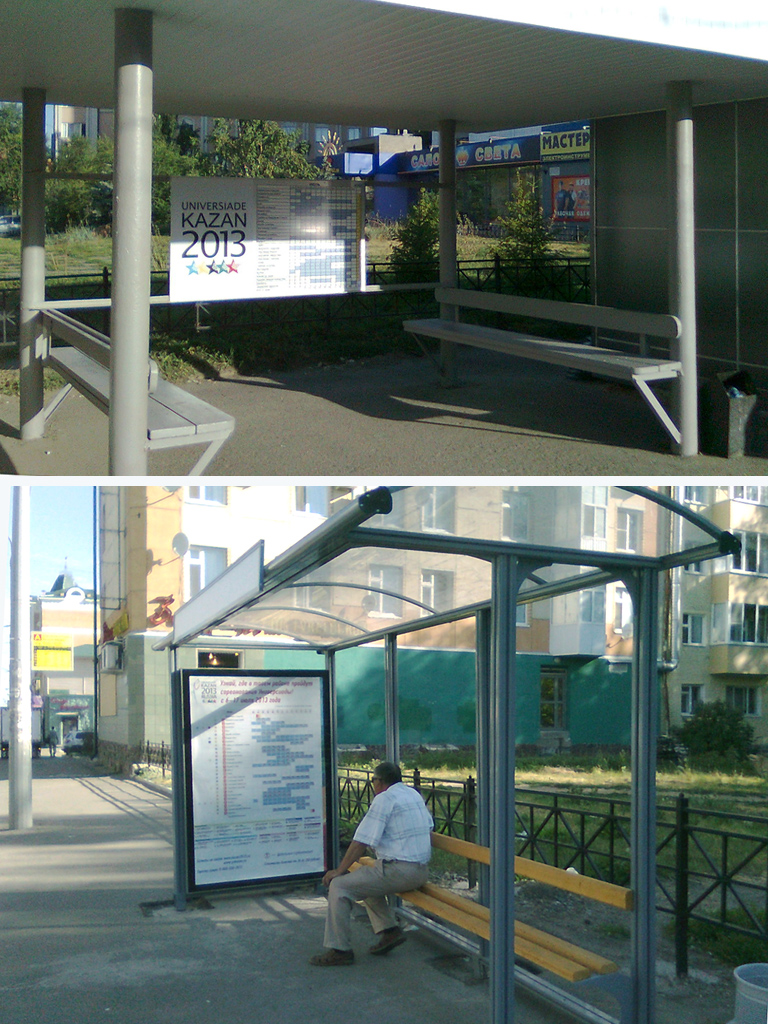
The competition schedule at stops

The competition schedule for the 2013 Summer Universiade is shown as follows:

OC	Opening ceremony	●	Event competitions	1	Event finals	CC	Closing ceremony

July	5th Fri	6th Sat	7th Sun	8th Mon	9th Tue	10th Wed	11th Thu	12th Fri	13th Sat	14th Sun	15th Mon	16th Tue	17th Wed	Events
Ceremonies		OC											CC	
Athletics			2	6	11	10	7	14						50
Badminton	●	●	1		●	●	5							6
Basketball			●	●	●	●	●	●	●	●	1	1		2
Beach volleyball				●	●	●	●	1	1					2
Belt wrestling		●	7	5	7									19
Boxing	●	●	●	●	●	10								10
Canoeing									●	6	18			24
Chess					●	●	●	●		●	3			3
Diving	●	●	2	2	●	2	2	4						12
Fencing		●	2	2	2	2	2	2						12
Field hockey			●	●	●	●	●	●	●	1	1			2
Football	●		●	●	●	●	●	●	●	●	1	1		2
Gymnastics			1	1	2	10				●	2	6		22
Judo			4	4	4	4	2							18
Rowing		●	5	8										13
Rugby sevens										●	●	●	2	2
Sambo										6	6	6		18
Shooting								6	4	4	8	8	4	34
Swimming						4	5	5	7	4	7	8	2	42
Synchronised swimming	●	●	●	2	2									42
Table tennis				●	●	●	●	2	1	2	2			7
Tennis				●	●	●	●	●	●	●	2	5		7
Volleyball		●	●	●	●	●	●	●	●	●	1	1		2
Water polo	●	●	●	●		●	●	●	●	●	●	1	1	2
Weightlifting			3	2	2	2	3	3						15
Wrestling							4	3	4	3	4	3		21
Total events			27	32	30	44	30	40	17	26	56	40	9	351
Cumulative total			27	59	89	133	163	203	220	246	302	342	351	
July	5th Fri	6th Sat	7th Sun	8th Mon	9th Tue	10th Wed	11th Thu	12th Fri	13th Sat	14th Sun	15th Mon	16th Tue	17th Wed	Events

== Marketing ==
=== Logo, emblem and mascot ===
Every Universiade logo must contain the Latin letter "U", designating a sporting event held under the auspices of the International University Sports Federation (FISU). The logo of the 2013 Summer Universiade represents a vertical rectangular design that comprises the words "Universiade", "Kazan", "Russia", "2013" and the five stars of the International University Sports Federation (FISU).

The emblem of the 2013 Summer Universiade takes its origin from an image of a tulip, a common element of Tatar ornaments that symbolizes revival.

Uni, a kitten rendering of the symbolic winged snow leopard, was chosen as the mascot for the Kazan 2013 Summer Universiade. The winged snow leopard is the national symbol of the Republic of Tatarstan. A stylized version of this creature is represented on Tatarstan's coat of arms.

=== Slogan ===
Each Universiade host city chooses a slogan for their edition of the Games, according to their ideals and goals, and as approved by FISU. The slogan of the Kazan 2013 Summer Universiade was 'U are the world', which has two meanings: 'You are the world' and 'Universiade is the World'.

=== Partners ===
The League of Partners was founded in November 2010 to ensure a multilateral partnership between business circles and the Kazan 2013 Organizing Committee. The League includes the companies that signed partnership agreements with the executive committee of the 27th World University Summer Games. The main mission of the League of Partners is to enlist the support of corporations through a partnership contract with the Kazan 2013 Executive Committee, and also to consolidate all efforts under the unified vision of the Universiade. To achieve that, the partner companies were to implement joint projects aimed at further developing specialized industries that will be part of the Kazan 2013 legacy.

- General partners: Hyundai, MegaFon, local AK BARS Bank
- Official partners: Coca-Cola, McDonald's, Sogaz, Aeroflot, Tissot
- Partners: PWC, EF, Panasonic
- Official suppliers: Danone, Ecolab, Forward, Planet Fitness, ROSTEK-TRANS Logistika, Kaspersky Lab, Technogym, MadWave, Sportmaster Group, Wilson

=== Tickets ===
Tickets price ran between 700 and 6000 Russian rubles for the opening and closing ceremonies, and 30 to 200 RR for sporting events. Tickets began to be sold on the Internet one year before the Universiade.

=== Media support ===
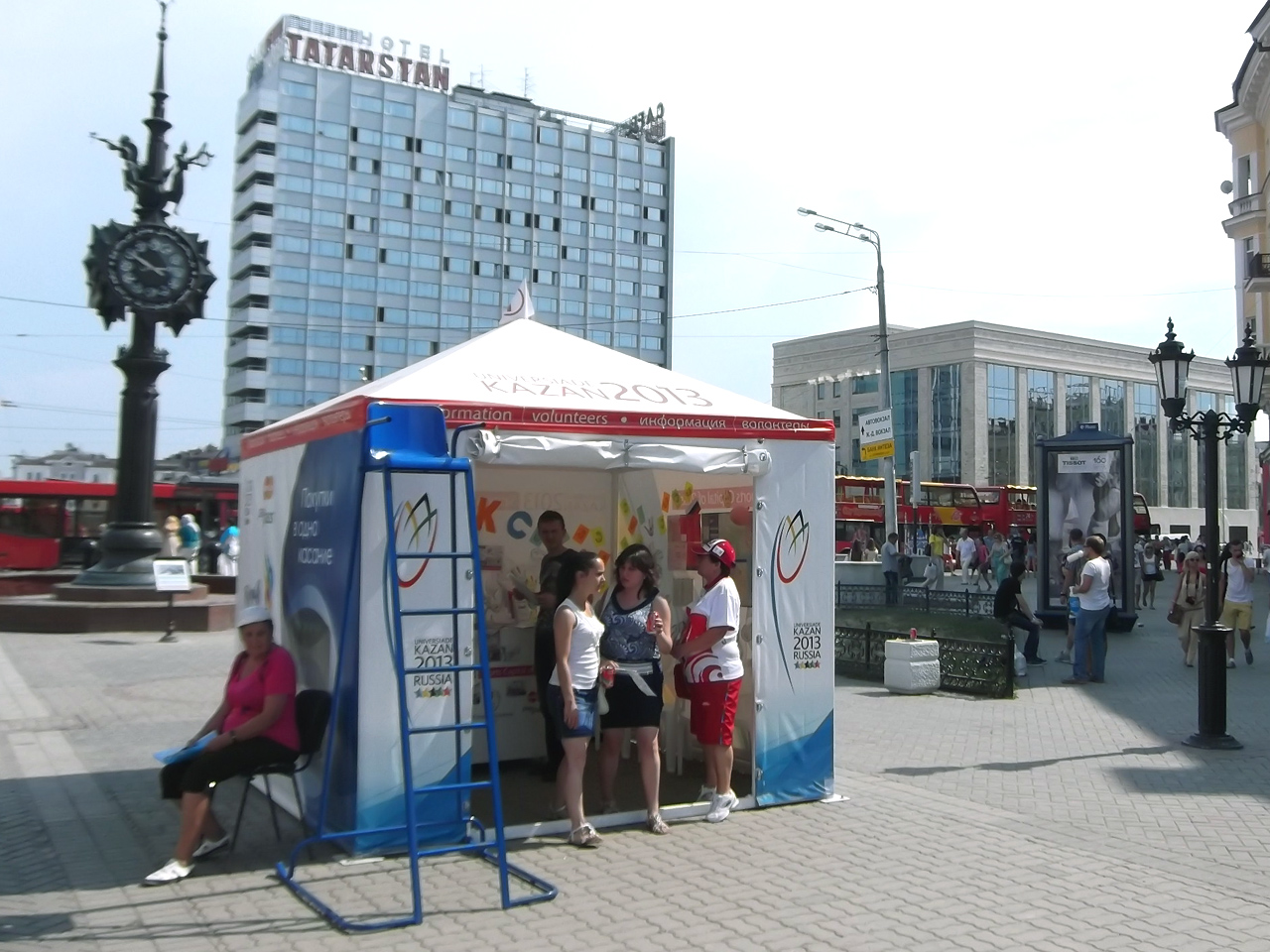
Street info point with volunteers

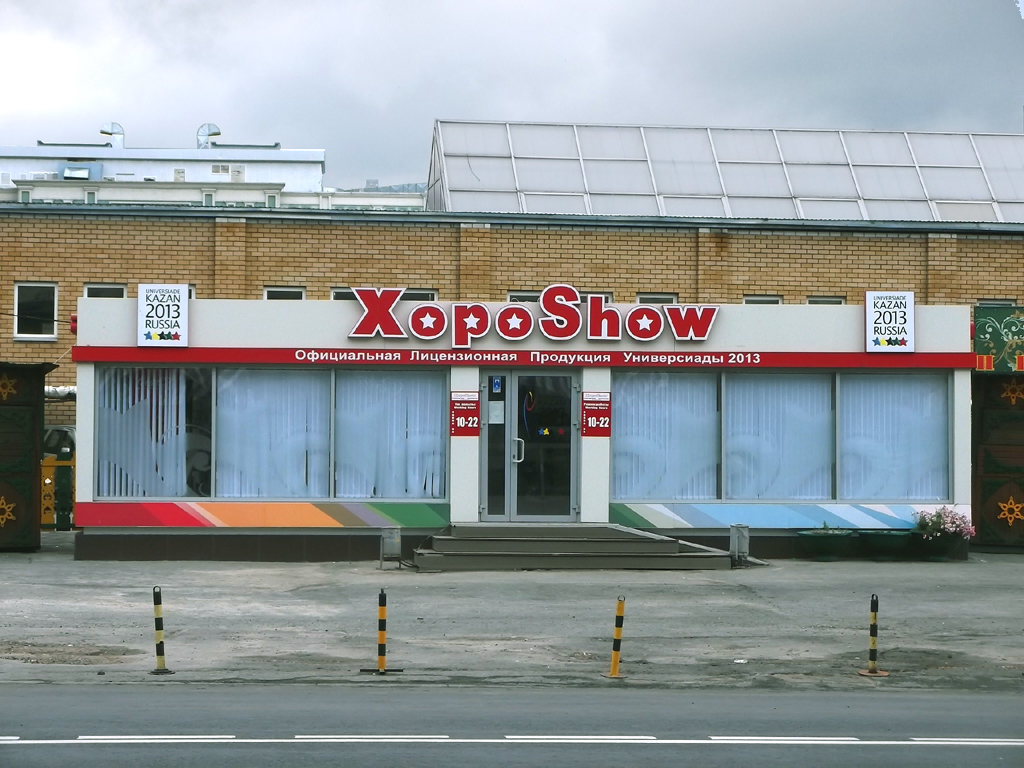
Souvenir shop

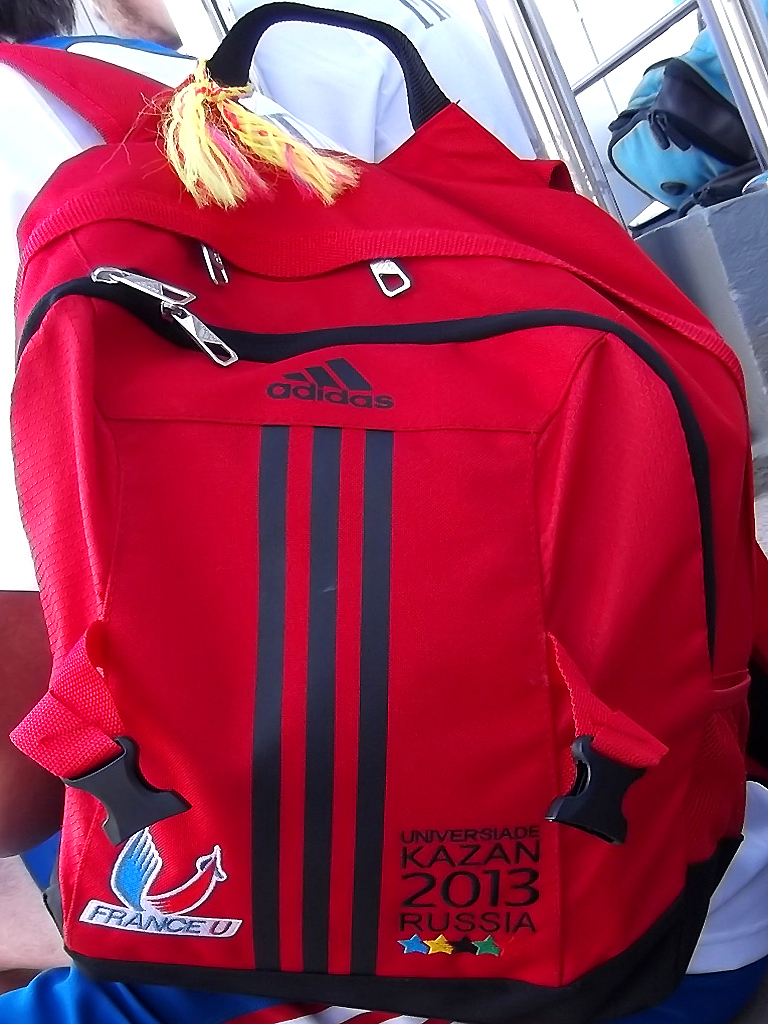
Bags for athletes and spectators

Some 1,200 journalists from 170 countries were assisted by the Main Press Center (MPC), the International Broadcasting Center (IBC) at Kazan Arena, and the International Info Center at Universiade Village.

The games were televised by Eurosport as well as by 12 other international and three Russian TV networks.

== Legacy ==
After the Universiade, the venues and stadia were to be consigned over to high schools and universities of Kazan, to children and youth sport schools, and to Olympic reserve schools. The Universiade Village was to be integrated into the main campus of the Federal University system.

=== Coins ===
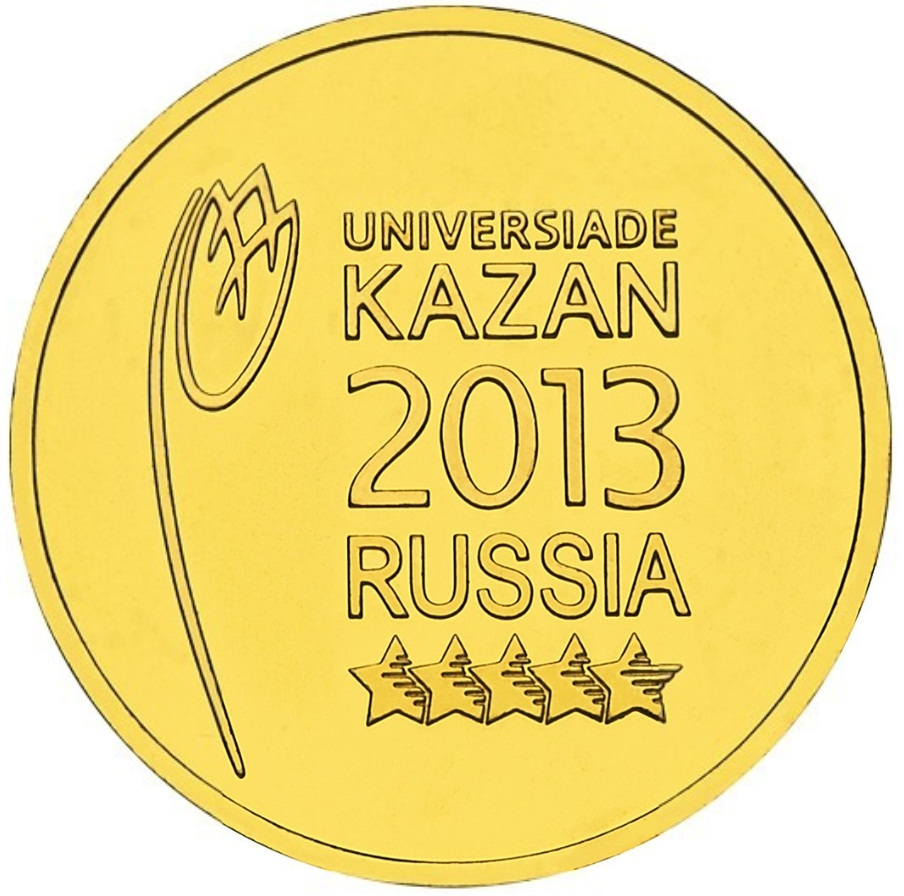
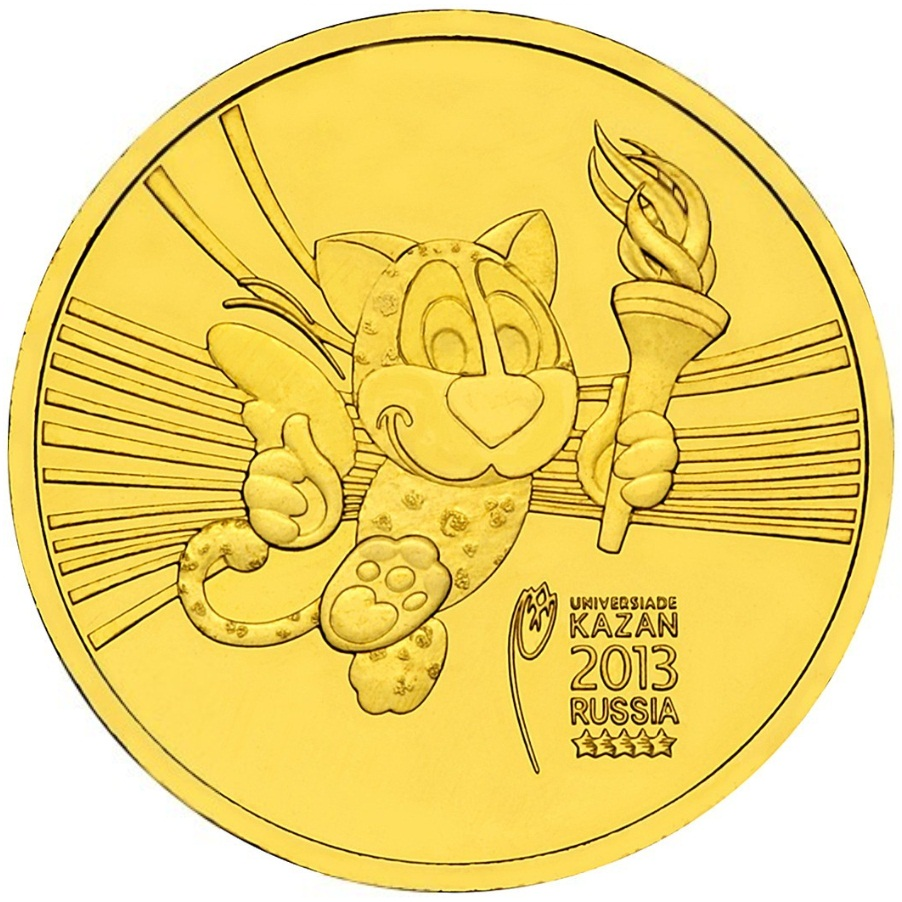
10 ruble coins

The Central Bank of Russia issued commemorative coins dedicated to the 27th Summer Universiade Kazan 2013, including silver 3-ruble and 25-ruble, and gold 50-ruble, coins along with 10,000 ruble coins soon to appear in the banks of Russia. The bank also planned to put into circulation two kinds of 10-ruble base-metal coins to mark the Universiade. These commemorative coins are accepted without limitation for all types of payment as legal tender in the Russian Federation.
