= Mongolia at the 2013 Summer Universiade =

- IOC code: MGL
- NOC: Mongolian National Olympic Committee
- Website: www.olympic.mn

in Kazan
- Competitors: 133
- Medals Ranked 20th: Gold 3 Silver 6 Bronze 16 Total 25

Summer Universiade appearances
- 1959; 1961; 1963; 1965; 1967; 1970; 1973; 1975; 1977; 1979; 1981; 1983; 1985; 1987; 1989; 1991; 1993; 1995; 1997; 1999; 2001; 2003; 2005; 2007; 2009; 2011; 2013; 2015; 2017; 2019; 2021; 2025; 2027

Mongolia competed at the 2013 Summer Universiade in Kazan, Russia from 6 July to 17 July 2013. A total of 133 athletes made up the Mongolian team.

Mongolia won 25 medals, including 3 gold medals.

== Medal summary ==
=== Medals by sport ===
Sport	Gold	Silver	Bronze	Total
Boxing	1	0	5	6
Belt wrestling	1	1	4	6
Judo		1		1
Sambo		1	4	5
Shooting	0	1	1	2
Wrestling	1	2	2	5
Total	3	6	16	25

=== Medalists ===
Medal	Name	Sport	Rank	Event
Gold	Kharkhuugiin Enkhdelger	Boxing	4	Men's 52 kg
Gold	Boldpurveiin Sugarjargal	Belt wrestling	4	Men's +100 kg
Bronze	Ganzorigiin Mandakhnaran	Freestyle wrestling	5	Men's 66 kg
Bronze	Dorjkhandyn Khüderbulga	Freestyle wrestling	5	Men's 96 kg
Silver	Erdenechimegiin Sumiyaa	Freestyle wrestling	5	Women's 51 kg
Gold	Soronzonboldyn Battsetseg	Freestyle wrestling	5	Women's 63 kg
Silver	Ochirbatyn Nasanburmaa	Freestyle wrestling	5	Women's 67 kg
Silver	Bunddorjiin Janchivdorj	Judo	12	Men's 90 kg
Silver	Nandinzaya Gankhuyag; Yanjinlkham Olzvoibaatar; Narantuya Chuluunbadrakh	Shooting	13	Women's team 10 metre air rifle
Bronze	Nandinzaya Gankhuyag	Shooting	13	Women's 10 metre air rifle
