= Olena Kunytska =

Ukrainian Hetmana

Olena Kunytska Олена Куницька
- Died: 1684
- Spouse: Stefan Kunicki

Olena Kunytska (Ukrainian: Олена Куницька) (died 1684), was a Ukrainian Hetmana by marriage to Stefan Kunicki, Hetman of Ukraine (r. 1672–1684). She was an influential figure among the Ukrainian Cossacks. She is known as a valuable political adviser to her spouse and for an act of military evacuation which caused the rival hetman to attempt to abduct her.
