= Belarus at the 2013 Summer Universiade =

- IOC code: BLR

in Kazan
- Competitors: 163
- Medals Ranked 5th: Gold 13 Silver 13 Bronze 14 Total 40

Summer Universiade appearances
- 1959; 1961; 1963; 1965; 1967; 1970; 1973; 1975; 1977; 1979; 1981; 1983; 1985; 1987; 1989; 1991; 1993; 1995; 1997; 1999; 2001; 2003; 2005; 2007; 2009; 2011; 2013; 2015; 2017; 2019; 2021

Belarus competed at the 2013 Summer Universiade in Kazan, Russia from 6 July to 17 July 2013. 163 athletes are a part of the Belarusian team.

Belarus won 40 medals (7th place), including 13 gold medals (5th place), more than United States.
