= Kazakhstan at the 2013 Summer Universiade =

- IOC code: KAZ
- NOC: National Olympic Committee of the Republic of Kazakhstan
- Website: http://www.olympic.kz/

in Kazan, Russia 6 – 17 July 2013
- Competitors: 169
- Medals Ranked 19th: Gold 3 Silver 11 Bronze 16 Total 30

Summer Universiade appearances
- 1959; 1961; 1963; 1965; 1967; 1970; 1973; 1975; 1977; 1979; 1981; 1983; 1985; 1987; 1989; 1991; 1993; 1995; 1997; 1999; 2001; 2003; 2005; 2007; 2009; 2011; 2013; 2015; 2017; 2019; 2021

Kazakhstan participated at the 2013 Summer Universiade, in Kazan, Russia.
