= Russia at the 2013 Summer Universiade =

- IOC code: RUS

in Kazan
- Competitors: 663 in all sports
- Medals Ranked 1st: Gold 155 Silver 75 Bronze 62 Total 292

Summer Universiade appearances (overview)
- 1993; 1995; 1997; 1999; 2001; 2003; 2005; 2007; 2009; 2011; 2013; 2015; 2017; 2019; 2021; 2025; 2027

Russian Federation hosted and competed at the 2013 Summer Universiade in Kazan, Russia. 663 athletes are a part of the Russian team which is the biggest team there. Russian team took a first place with almost a half of gold and more than quarter of all medals and set 38 of 67 records in this Universiade.

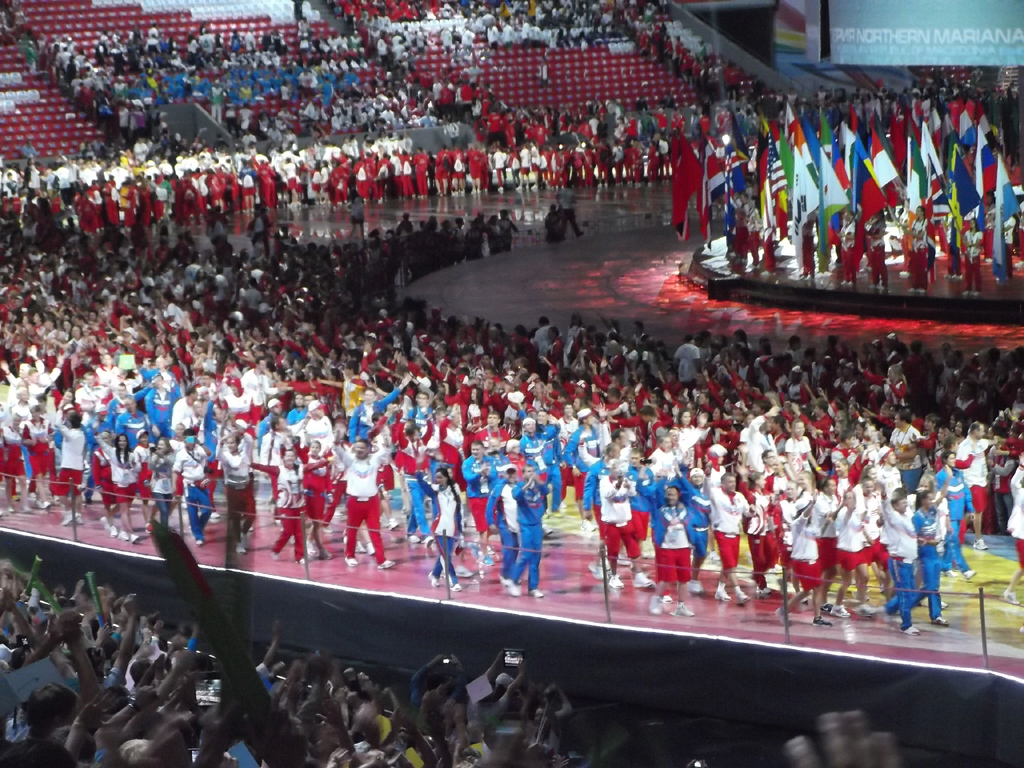
Russian team on the parade at the closing of Universiade

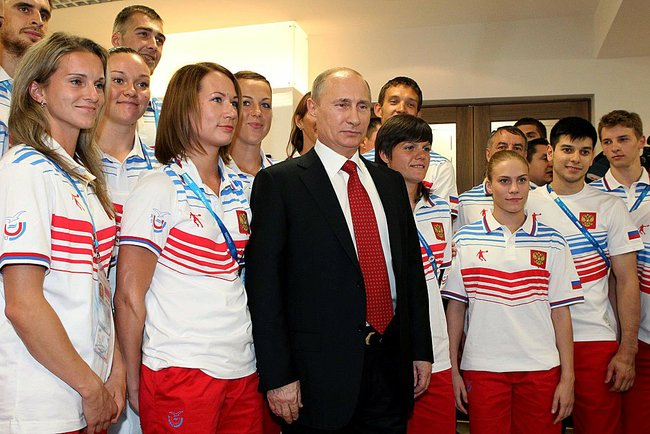
President Vladimir Putin with Russian team

== Athletics ==
Men
Track & road events

Athlete	Event	Heat		Quarterfinal		Semifinal		Final	
Athlete	Event	Result	Rank	Result	Rank	Result	Rank	Result	Rank
Aleksandr Brednev	Men's 100 metres	10.52	11 Q	10.42	Q	10.43	12	10.51	5
Mikhail Idrisov	Men's 100 metres	10.53	Q	10.41	10 Q	10.48	Q	10.64	8
Aleksandr Khyutte	Men's 200 metres								
Artur Reysbikh	Men's 200 metres								
Vladimir Krasnov	Men's 400 metres	47.14	Q			46.03	Q	45.49	1st place, gold medalist(s)
Kiril Simakov	800 metres	1:50.80	1 Q			1:50.15	15	did not advance	
Valentin Smirnov	1500 metres	3:41.14	Q	—N/a				3:39.39	(gold) SB

== Badminton ==
Russia will be represented by five male and six female badminton players.

=== Men's ===
Athlete	Event	Round of 32	Round of 16	Quarterfinals	Semifinals	Final	
Athlete	Event	Opposition Score	Opposition Score	Opposition Score	Opposition Score	Opposition Score	Rank
Denis Grachev	Men's singles	(France) marin baumann L (16–21, 16–21)	did not advance				
Vladimir Malkov	Men's singles						
Andrey Parakhodin	Men's singles						
Denis Grachev; Vladimir Malkov; Andrey Parakhodin	Men's doubles						
Denis Grachev; Vladimir Malkov; Andrey Parakhodin	Men's team						

=== Women's ===
Athlete	Event	Round of 32	Round of 16	Quarterfinals	Semifinals	Final	
Athlete	Event	Opposition Score	Opposition Score	Opposition Score	Opposition Score	Opposition Score	Rank
Tatyana Bibik	Women's singles						
Kseniya Polikarpova	Women's singles						
Tatyana Bibik; Anastasiya Chervyakova; Irina Khlebko; Evgeniya Kosetskaya; Kseniya Polikarpova; Nina Vislova	Women's doubles						

=== Mixed ===
Athlete	Event	Round of 32	Round of 16	Quarterfinals	Semifinals	Final	
Athlete	Event	Opposition Score	Opposition Score	Opposition Score	Opposition Score	Opposition Score	Rank
Vladimir Ivanov; Irina Khlebko; Evgeniya Kosetskaya; Ivan Sozonov; Nina Vislova; Anatoliy Yartsev	Mixed						

== Basketball ==
Russia has a male and a female team.

=== Men's ===
The men's team will participate in Group A.

Group play

Team	Pld	W	L	PF	PA	PD	Pts
Russia	5	5	0	510	215	+295	10
Estonia	5	4	1	324	330	−6	9
Germany	5	3	2	405	304	+101	8
South Korea	5	2	3	409	449	−40	7
Ukraine	5	1	4	350	378	−28	6
Oman	5	0	5	220	542	−322	5

7 July 2013
21:00

Report

Russia	117–24	Oman
Scoring by quarter: 29–6, 28–6, 29–4, 31–8

Basket Hall

8 July 2013
21:00

Report

Russia	106–43	Estonia
Scoring by quarter: 24–10, 25–13, 26–4, 31–16

Basket Hall

9 July 2013
21:00

Report

Russia	113–53	South Korea
Scoring by quarter: 27–14, 30–15, 33–13, 23–11

Basket Hall

11 July 2013
21:00

Report

Russia	94–43	Ukraine
Scoring by quarter: 23–14, 22–10, 21–13, 28–6

Basket Hall

12 July 2013
21:00

Report

Russia	80–52	Germany
Scoring by quarter: 15–7, 22–15, 23–16, 20–14

Basket Hall

Quarterfinals

14 July 2013
21:00

Report

Russia	78–53	Romania
Scoring by quarter: 17–15, 16–12, 21–12, 24–14
Pts: Karasev 22; Rebs: Karasev 9 Asts: Grigoryev 5		Pts: Țibîrnă 18; Rebs: Țibîrnă 7 Asts: Petrișor, Török 2

Basket Hall
Attendance: 2,000
Referees: Reid Allan Kenyon (CAN), Saulius Racys (LTU), Kihamu Matsumoto (JPN)

semifinals

15 July 2013
16:30

Report

Russia	78–68	Canada
Scoring by quarter: 22–11, 21–15, 21–18, 14–24
Pts: Karasev 20; Rebs: Karasev 10; Asts: Karasev 7		Pts: three players 12; Rebs: T. Scrubb, Mullings 7 Asts: Mullings, P. Scrubb 3

Basket Hall
Attendance: 2,500
Referees: Boris Schmidt (GER), Stanislav Kucera (CZE), Rodrigo Oliveros (CHI)

Final

16 July 2013
21:30

Report

Russia	81–74	Australia
Scoring by quarter: 25–15, 16–16, 24–26, 16–17
Pts: Zubkov 19; Rebs: Karasev, Zubkov 6 Asts: three players 3		Pts: Steindl, Bairstow 21; Rebs: Dumovic 9 Asts: Cadee 7

Basket Hall
Referees: Mindaugas Vecherskis (LTU), Boris Schmidt (GER), Reid Kenyon (CAN)

=== Women's ===
The women's team will participate in Group A.

Roster

The women's team roster is as follows:

Russian Women's World University Games Team roster
Players
Coaches

Pos.	No.	Name	Age – Date of birth	Height	Club	Ctr.
SG	8	Tatiana Abrikosova	24 – May 28, 1989		Dynamo Moscow	(Russia)
F	12	Veronica Dorosheva	22 – March 4, 1991		Dynamo Moscow	(Russia)
PG	5	Ekaterina Fedorenkova	19 – August 12, 1993		Dynamo Moscow	(Russia)
G	9	Evgeniya Finogentova	22 – February 23, 1991		Kazanotchka	(Russia)
C	13	Lyubov' Paskalenko	22 – October 20, 1990		WBC Dynamo Novosibirsk	(Russia)
PF	15	Nadezhda Grishaeva	24 – July 2, 1989	6 ft 5 in (1.96 m)	Dynamo Moscow	(Russia)
C	11	Natalya Vieru	23 – July 25, 1989	6 ft 6 in (1.98 m)	WBC Spartak Moscow Region	(Russia)
	6	Nadezhda Mayorova	24 – February 6, 1989		Enisey (women's basketball)	(Russia)
	10	Anastasia Shilova	22 – January 10, 1991		WBC Dynamo Novosibirsk	(Russia)
	14	Anastasia Loginova	22 – July 13, 1990		WBC Dynamo Novosibirsk	(Russia)
	7	Anastasia Logunova	22 – July 20, 1990		Chevakata Vologda	(Russia)
PG	4	Tatyana Grigorieva	23 – May 24, 1990		Rostov-Don/Dynamo Moscow	(Russia)

Head coach

- (Russia) Boris Sokolovsky

Legend

- (C) Team captain
- nat field describes country of club/university
- Age field is age on July 7, 2013

group play

Team	Pld	W	L	PF	PA	PD	Pts
Russia	3	3	0	271	128	+143	6
Sweden	3	2	1	232	143	+89	5
Poland	3	1	2	202	187	+15	4
Mongolia	3	0	3	88	335	−247	3

8 July 2013
18:30

Report

Russia	123–23	Mongolia
Scoring by quarter: 31–10, 33–7, 30–0, 29–6

Basket Hall

9 July 2013
18:30

Report

Russia	74–37	Poland
Scoring by quarter: 18–11, 19–6, 20–9, 17–11

Basket Hall

10 July 2013
18:30

Report

Russia	74–68	Sweden
Scoring by quarter: 18–13, 15–20, 19–22, 22–13

Basket Hall

Quarterfinal

12 July 2013
18:30

Report

Russia	74–66	Czech Republic
Scoring by quarter: 16–19, 13–14, 25–23, 20–10

Basket Hall

Semifinal

13 July 2013
18:30

Report

Russia	69–51	Chinese Taipei
Scoring by quarter: 23–17, 13–13, 17–8, 16–13

Basket Hall

Gold Medal Match

12 August 2012

(gold) United States	90–71	Russia (silver)
Scoring by quarter: 22–13, 19–14, 27–20, 22–24
Pts: Hartley 17; Rebs: Hooper 9 Asts: Massengale 5		Pts: Vieru 13; Rebs: Vieru 9 Asts: Logunova 4

Attendance: 4,000
Referees: Ivana Ivanovic (SRB), Wang Zebo (CHN), Toni Caldwell (AUS)

== Beach volleyball ==
Athlete	Event	Preliminary round	Standing	Round of 16	Quarterfinals	Semifinals	Final / BM	
Athlete	Event	Opposition Score	Standing	Opposition Score	Opposition Score	Opposition Score	Opposition Score	Rank
Konstantin Semenov; Koshkarev	Men's	(Hong Kong) Wong – Yeung; W 2 – 0 (21–11, 21–6) (Austria) Dressler – Kandolf; W 2 – 0 (21–16, 21–13) (New Zealand) Hartles – Hawkins} W 2 – 0 (21–16, 21–13)	Q	(Belarus) Dziadkou – Vishneuski; W 2– 0	(Brazil)			

Men

Athlete	Event	Round of 32	Round of 16	Quarterfinals	Semifinals	Final	
Athlete	Event	Opposition Result	Opposition Result	Opposition Result	Opposition Result	Opposition Result	Rank
Galanov Belik		Bye	(Armenia) Koryun Soghomonyan	(South Korea) Kim In-Kyu			
Evgeny Tishchenko		Bye					
Magomed Omarov		Bye					

== Chess ==
Athlete	Event	Win	Draw	Lost	Points	Finals				
Athlete	Event	Win	Draw	Lost	Points	Win	Draw	Lost	Points	Rank
Evgeny Alekseev	Men's individual									

== Diving ==
Men

Athlete	Event	Preliminaries		Semifinals		Final	
Athlete	Event	Points	Rank	Points	Rank	Points	Rank
Ilya Zakharov		508,30	1 Q	500,50	1 Q	460	6

== Fencing ==
Women

Athlete	Event	Round of 64	Round of 32	Round of 16	Quarterfinal	Semifinal	Final / BM	
Athlete	Event	Opposition Score	Opposition Score	Opposition Score	Opposition Score	Opposition Score	Opposition Score	Rank
Violetta Kolobova	Épée	(Romania) Dumitru; W 15–7	(Israel) Marinuk; W15–12	(Russia) Andryushina; L14–15	did not advance			
Elena Shasharina	Épée	(Estonia) Zuikova; L11–15	did not advance					
Tatyana Andryushina	Épée	(Romania) Udrea; W 8–15	(Romania) Donoiu; W14	(Russia) Kolobova; W14–15	(South Korea) Shin A-lam; L 15–12			
Yana Zvereva	Épée	(Ukraine) Pantelyeyeva; W10–15	(Germany) Suhrbier; W9–15	(Estonia) Kuusk; L7–6	did not advance			

== Field hockey ==
=== Men's ===
Team	Pld	W	D	L	GF	GA	GD	Pts
Russia	4	4	0	0	16	4	+12	12
Malaysia	4	3	0	1	14	7	+7	9
South Africa	4	1	1	2	11	12	–1	4
Italy	4	1	1	2	10	15	–5	4
Poland	4	0	0	4	8	21	–13	0

8 July 2013
16:30

Russia	3–0	Italy
Yankun 20'; Sinyagin 35'; Golubev 40'	Report

Umpires:
Jakub Mejzlik (CZE)
Yoshikuni Tomiyama (JPN)

10 July 2013
17:30

Russia	4–1	Malaysia
Komarov 17'; Sinyagin 26'; Kurbanov 27'; Golubev 47'	Report	Abd Rahim 8'

Umpires:
Michal Margolien (SVK)
Maksym Perepelytsya (UKR)

11 July 2013
17:30

South Africa	2–4	Russia
Mvimbi 13', 64'	Report	Siuskin 16'; Yankun 22'; Sinyagin 61'; Kornilov 70'

Umpires:
Jakub Mejzlik (CZE)
Benjamin Göntgen (GER)

13 July 2013
16:30

Russia	5–1	Poland
Komarov 5'; Maiorov 30'; Golubev 40'; Kornilov 48'; Sinyagin 50'	Report	Pacanowski 31'

Umpires:
Shin Dong-Yun (KOR)
Yoshikun Tomiyama (JPN)

Gold Medal Match

15 July 2013
18:15

Russia	2–1	France
Plesetckii 19'; Kornilov 42'	Report	Baumgarten 34'

Umpires:
Nazmi Bin Kamarudin (MAS)
Jakub Mejzlik (CZE)

=== Women's ===
groupplay

Team	Pld	W	D	L	GF	GA	GD	Pts
South Korea	3	3	0	0	11	2	+9	9
Russia	3	1	1	1	6	6	0	4
Japan	3	1	0	2	6	7	–1	3
Belarus	3	0	1	2	3	11	–8	1

9 July 2013
19:45

Russia	3–2	Japan
Shaburova 16'; Svezhentseva 39'; Goncharevskaya 45'	Report	Mitsuhashi 4'; Ichitani 23'

Umpires:
Ana Faias (POR)
Lim Mi-Sook (KOR)

11 July 2013
13:30

South Korea	2–1	Russia
Cho Eun-Ji 12'; Park Ki-Ju 23'	Report	Sorokina 53'

Umpires:
Junko Wagatsuma (JPN)
Ivona Makar (CRO)

12 July 2013
18:00

Russia	2–2	Belarus
Salamatina 42'; Sorokina 51'	Report	Mikheichyk 59'; Syrayezhka 64'

Umpires:
Junko Wagatsuma (JPN)
Lim Mi-Sook (KOR)

Gold Medal Match

14 July 2013
18:15

South Korea	5–0	Russia
Park Seung-A 5'; Han Hye-Lyoung 9'; Kim Jong-Eun 30', 37'; Cho Eun-Ji 39'	Report

Umpires:
Ana Faias (POR)
Ivona Makar (CRO)

== Football ==
=== Men's ===
Group play

Team	Pld	W	D	L	GF	GA	GD	Pts
Russia	3	2	0	1	5	2	+3	6
Republic of Ireland	3	1	1	1	4	4	0	4
Mexico	3	1	1	1	1	2	−1	4
China	3	0	2	1	2	4	−2	2

5 July 2013
20:00

Russia	1–2	Republic of Ireland
Dyadyun 16'	Report	Davidson 12'; Forsyth 81' (pen.)

Rubin Stadium
Referee: Antonio Damato (Italy)
8 July 2013
20:00

Russia	2–0	Mexico
Nikitin 55'; Ustinov 69'	Report

Rubin Stadium
Referee: Kulasande Qongqo (South Africa)
10 July 2013
20:00

Russia	2–0	China
Dyadyun 66'; Bezlikhotnov 90+3'	Report

Rubin Stadium
Referee: Diego Haro (Peru)

Quarterfinal

12 July 2013
20:00

Russia	4–1	Canada
Dyadyun 9', 28'; Nikiforov 90+1'; Bocharov 90+2'	Report	Murphy 45+2' (pen.)

Rubin Stadium
Referee: Jorge Rojas (Mexico)

Semifinal

14 July 2013
20:00

Russia	1–1	Great Britain
Dyadyun 68'	Report	Rae 80'
Penalties
Dyadyun (penalty missed); Bezlikhotnov (penalty scored); Nikitin (penalty scored); Golubev (penalty scored)	3–5	(penalty scored) Platt; (penalty scored) Dyer; (penalty scored) Winter; (penalty scored) Richman; (penalty scored) Moses

Rubin Stadium
Referee: Diego Haro (Peru)

Match For Bronze

16 July 2013
16:00

Japan	3–0	Russia
Ogawa 17'; Akasaki 82', 89'	Report

Rubin Stadium
Referee: Jorge Rojas (Mexico)

=== Women's ===
Group play

Team	Pld	W	D	L	GF	GA	GD	Pts
Chinese Taipei	3	2	0	1	5	4	+1	6
South Korea	3	1	1	1	6	5	+1	4
South Africa	3	1	1	1	5	5	0	4
Russia	3	1	0	2	2	4	−2	3

5 July 2013
17:00

Russia	1–0	South Africa
Sinyutina 10'	Report

Rubin Stadium
Referee: Francia González (Mexico)

7 July 2013
20:00

Russia	0–1	Chinese Taipei
	Report	Lee Hsiu-Chin 36'

Rubin Stadium
Referee: Rikako Kuwahara (Japan)

9 July 2013
20:00

Russia	1–3	South Korea
Cholovyaga 30'	Report	Jang Sel-Gi 25'; Lee Geum-Min 52', 84'

Rubin Stadium
Referee: Francia González (Mexico)

Classification Round

Team	Pld	W	D	L	GF	GA	GD	Pts
Russia	3	3	0	0	8	1	+7	9
Canada	3	2	0	1	6	3	+3	6
China	3	0	1	2	2	7	−5	1
Estonia	3	0	1	2	1	6	−5	1

11 July 2013
20:00

Estonia	0–2	Russia
	Report	Chub 9'; Sinyutina 17'

Raketa Stadium
Referee: Park Ji-Yeong (Korea Republic)

13 July 2013
17:00

China	0–4	Russia
	Report	Cholovyaga 10', 62'; Pantukhina 66'; Kemryugova 87'

Raketa Stadium
Referee: Sheena Marie Law (Canada)
15 July 2013
14:00

Russia	2–1	Canada
Sinyutina 23', 72'	Report	Sawicki 59'

Olymp Stadium
Referee: Qin Liang (China)

== Gymnastics ==
=== Artistic ===
Men
Team

Individual finals

Athlete	Event	Apparatus						Total	Rank
Athlete	Event	F	PH	R	V	PB	HB	Total	Rank
Nikolai Kuksenkov	All around	14,850	14,850	15,050	14,700	15,150	15,350	89,950	1st place, gold medalist(s)
Nikolai Kuksenkov	Rings	—N/a	—N/a		—N/a	—N/a	—N/a	—N/a	5
Nikolai Kuksenkov	Pommel Horse	—N/a	15,450	—N/a	—N/a	—N/a	—N/a	15,450	1st place, gold medalist(s)
David Belyavskiy	All around	14,800	15,000	14,500	15,100	15,700	14,500	89,600	2nd place, silver medalist(s)

== Rugby sevens ==
=== Men's ===
Group play

Team	GP	W	D	L	PF	PA	PD	Pts
Russia	3	3	0	0	128	5	+123	9
Poland	3	2	0	1	63	53	+10	7
Canada	3	1	0	2	61	81	−20	5
Ukraine	3	0	0	3	12	125	−113	3

14 July 2013
10:28

Russia	45–0	Canada
	Report

Tulpar Stadium

14 July 2013
14:52

Russia	45–0	Ukraine
	Report

Tulpar Stadium

15 July 2013
14:24

Russia	38–5	Poland
	Report

Tulpar Stadium

Quarterfinals

16 July 2013
11:28

Russia	39–0	Italy
	Report

Tulpar Stadium

Semifinals

16 July 2013
17:18

Russia	17–14	South Africa
	Report

Tulpar Stadium

Gold Medal Match

17 July 2013
12:55

Russia	29–19	France
	Report

Tulpar Stadium

== Volleyball ==
=== Men's ===
Group A

Pos	Team	Pld	W	L	Pts	SW	SL	SR	SPW	SPL	SPR	Qualification
1	Russia	5	5	0	14	15	2	7.500	407	304	1.339	Quarterfinals
2	South Korea	5	4	1	12	12	4	3.000	382	332	1.151	Quarterfinals
3	Belarus	5	3	2	10	12	6	2.000	406	361	1.125	9th–16th place
4	Estonia	5	2	3	6	6	9	0.667	336	340	0.988	9th–16th place
5	Hong Kong	5	1	4	3	3	13	0.231	310	391	0.793	17th–21st place
6	United States	5	0	5	0	1	15	0.067	289	402	0.719	17th–21st place

6 July 2013; 14:00	Russia	3–0	South Korea
6 July 2013; 14:00	(25–21, 25–16, 25–20)

7 July 2014; 20:00	Russia	3–0	Hong Kong
7 July 2014; 20:00	(26–24, 25–12, 25–15)

8 July 2014; 19:00	United States	0–3	Russia
8 July 2014; 19:00	(13–25, 18–25, 9–25)

10 July 2013	Russia	v	Estonia
10 July 2013	(25–18, 25–22, 25–21)

11 July 2013; 20:00	Belarus	2–3	Russia
11 July 2013; 20:00	(25–25, 17–25, 22–25, 25–19, 6–15)

Quarterfinal

13 July 2013; 20:00	Russia	3–0	Brazil
13 July 2013; 20:00	(25–29, 25–12, 25–14)

Semifinal

14 July 2013; 20:00	Russia	3–1	Japan
14 July 2013; 20:00	(25–15, 25–10, 22–25, 25–22)

Gold Medal Match

16 July 2013; 20:00	Russia	3–0	Poland
16 July 2013; 20:00	(25–22, 25–19, 25–19)

=== Women's ===
Group A

Pos	Team	Pld	W	L	Pts	SW	SL	SR	SPW	SPL	SPR	Qualification
1	Russia	3	3	0	9	9	0	MAX	225	154	1.461	Quarterfinals
2	Poland	3	2	1	6	6	3	2.000	196	187	1.048	Quarterfinals
3	Czech Republic	3	1	2	3	3	6	0.500	188	203	0.926	9th–15th place
4	United States	3	0	3	0	0	9	0.000	162	227	0.714	9th–15th place

Date	Time		Score		Set 1	Set 2	Set 3	Set 4	Set 5	Total	Report
8 July	18:00	Russia	3–0	Czech Republic	25–17	25–17	25–16			75–50	P2 P3
9 July	18:00	Russia	3–0	Poland	25–16	25–15	25–15			75–46	P2 P3
10 July	18:00	United States	0–3	Russia	16–25	23–25	19–25			58–75	P2 P3

Quarterfinals

Date	Time		Score		Set 1	Set 2	Set 3	Set 4	Set 5	Total	Report
12 July	20:00	Russia	3–0	Chinese Taipei	25–21	25–17	25–22			75–60	P2 P3

Semifinals

Date	Time		Score		Set 1	Set 2	Set 3	Set 4	Set 5	Total	Report
13 July	18:00	Russia	3–0	Thailand	25–18	25–19	25–18			75–55	P2 P3

Gold medal match

Date	Time		Score		Set 1	Set 2	Set 3	Set 4	Set 5	Total	Report
15 July	20:00	Russia	3–2	Brazil	25–27	25–21	25–21	16–25	15–10	106–104	P2 P3

== Water polo ==
=== Men's ===
Group Play

Team	GP	W	D	L	GF	GA	GD	Pts
Russia	5	5	0	0	78	33	+45	10
Hungary	5	4	0	1	71	34	+37	8
Japan	5	3	0	2	91	47	+44	6
Australia	5	2	0	3	58	44	+14	4
Canada	5	1	0	4	28	91	–63	2
Georgia	5	0	0	5	24	101	–77	0

5 July 2013; 14:00	Report	Japan	10–7	Australia	Burevestnik Swimming Pool; Referees: Dhossche (BEL), Peila (USA)
5 July 2013; 14:00	Report	Score by quarters: 2–3, 1–1, 1–1, 6–2			Burevestnik Swimming Pool; Referees: Dhossche (BEL), Peila (USA)
5 July 2013; 14:00	Report	Takei 5	Goals	Trabinger 2	Burevestnik Swimming Pool; Referees: Dhossche (BEL), Peila (USA)

5 July 2013; 20:00	Report	Russia	23–4	Canada	Burevestnik Swimming Pool; Referees: Riccitelli (ITA), Franulovic (CRO)
5 July 2013; 20:00	Report	Score by quarters: 5–2, 8–0, 5–2, 5–2			Burevestnik Swimming Pool; Referees: Riccitelli (ITA), Franulovic (CRO)
5 July 2013; 20:00	Report	Risov-Alenichev, Nagaev 5	Goals	Thumwood 2	Burevestnik Swimming Pool; Referees: Riccitelli (ITA), Franulovic (CRO)

7 July 2013; 20:00	Report	Russia	9–8	Hungary	Burevestnik Swimming Pool; Referees: Stavropoulos (GRE), Bianco (ITA)
7 July 2013; 20:00	Report	Score by quarters: 3–2, 3–2, 1–2, 2–2			Burevestnik Swimming Pool; Referees: Stavropoulos (GRE), Bianco (ITA)
7 July 2013; 20:00	Report	Ashaev 3	Goals	Korenyi, Kovács 2	Burevestnik Swimming Pool; Referees: Stavropoulos (GRE), Bianco (ITA)

8 July 2013; 20:00	Report	Russia	13–11	Japan	Burevestnik Swimming Pool; Referees: Stavropoulos (GRE), Peila (USA)
8 July 2013; 20:00	Report	Score by quarters: 4–3, 2–2, 5–1, 2–5			Burevestnik Swimming Pool; Referees: Stavropoulos (GRE), Peila (USA)
8 July 2013; 20:00	Report	Ashaev, Latypov 3	Goals	Takei 5	Burevestnik Swimming Pool; Referees: Stavropoulos (GRE), Peila (USA)

10 July 2013; 20:00	Report	Russia	12–7	Australia	Burevestnik Swimming Pool; Referees: Bianco (ITA), Franulovic (CRO)
10 July 2013; 20:00	Report	Score by quarters: 1–2, 2–3, 4–2, 5–0			Burevestnik Swimming Pool; Referees: Bianco (ITA), Franulovic (CRO)
10 July 2013; 20:00	Report	Lisunov 3	Goals	Sindone, Trabinger 2	Burevestnik Swimming Pool; Referees: Bianco (ITA), Franulovic (CRO)

11 July 2013; 20:00	Report	Russia	21–3	Georgia	Burevestnik Swimming Pool; Referees: Dhossche (BEL), Rakovic-Krstonosic (SRB)
11 July 2013; 20:00	Report	Score by quarters: 6–1, 4–0, 5–2, 6–0			Burevestnik Swimming Pool; Referees: Dhossche (BEL), Rakovic-Krstonosic (SRB)
11 July 2013; 20:00	Report	Latypov 5	Goals	Giorgadze 2	Burevestnik Swimming Pool; Referees: Dhossche (BEL), Rakovic-Krstonosic (SRB)

Quarterfinal

13 July 2013; 18:30	Report	Russia	14–5	Brazil	Burevestnik Swimming Pool; Referees: Szekely (HUN), Riccitelli (ITA)
13 July 2013; 18:30	Report	Score by quarters: 5–2, 3–0, 1–2, 5–1			Burevestnik Swimming Pool; Referees: Szekely (HUN), Riccitelli (ITA)
13 July 2013; 18:30	Report	Latypov, Andrukov 3	Goals	Correa 2	Burevestnik Swimming Pool; Referees: Szekely (HUN), Riccitelli (ITA)

semi final

15 July 2013; 20:00	Report	Serbia	11–12	Russia	Burevestnik Swimming Pool; Referees: Stavropoulos (GRE), Peila (USA)
15 July 2013; 20:00	Report	Score by quarters: 5–3, 1–6, 2–2, 3–1			Burevestnik Swimming Pool; Referees: Stavropoulos (GRE), Peila (USA)
15 July 2013; 20:00	Report	Dedovic 5	Goals	Risov-Alenichev 5	Burevestnik Swimming Pool; Referees: Stavropoulos (GRE), Peila (USA)

Gold Medal Match

17 July 2013; 13:00	Report	Hungary	5–4	Russia	Burevestnik Swimming Pool; Referees: Riccitelli (ITA), Stavropoulos (GRE)
17 July 2013; 13:00	Report	Score by quarters: 1–1, 1–1, 3–1, 0–1			Burevestnik Swimming Pool; Referees: Riccitelli (ITA), Stavropoulos (GRE)
17 July 2013; 13:00	Report	five players 1	Goals	Zinnatullin 2	Burevestnik Swimming Pool; Referees: Riccitelli (ITA), Stavropoulos (GRE)

=== Women's ===
Group

Team	GP	W	D	L	GF	GA	GD	Pts
Russia	3	3	0	0	67	20	+47	6
Canada	3	2	0	1	28	41	–13	4
Italy	3	1	0	2	35	36	–1	2
Japan	3	0	0	3	18	51	–33	0

6 July 2013; 13:00	Report	Russia	24–5	Japan	Olymp Swimming Pool; Referees: Boros-Djevi (AUS), Rodrigues (BRA)
6 July 2013; 13:00	Report	Score by quarters: 5–1, 6–0, 8–2, 5–2			Olymp Swimming Pool; Referees: Boros-Djevi (AUS), Rodrigues (BRA)
6 July 2013; 13:00	Report	Beliaeva 7	Goals	Kakiichi 2	Olymp Swimming Pool; Referees: Boros-Djevi (AUS), Rodrigues (BRA)

8 July 2013; 20:00	Report	Russia	24–4	Canada	Olymp Swimming Pool; Referees: Carney (AUS), Birri (HUN)
8 July 2013; 20:00	Report	Score by quarters: 6–2, 7–0, 4–0, 7–2			Olymp Swimming Pool; Referees: Carney (AUS), Birri (HUN)
8 July 2013; 20:00	Report	Beliaeva 6	Goals	four players 1	Olymp Swimming Pool; Referees: Carney (AUS), Birri (HUN)

10 July 2013; 20:00	Report	Italy	11–19	Russia	Olymp Swimming Pool; Referees: Birri (HUN), Peila (USA)
10 July 2013; 20:00	Report	Score by quarters: 3–4, 1–2, 3–6, 4–7			Olymp Swimming Pool; Referees: Birri (HUN), Peila (USA)
10 July 2013; 20:00	Report	Motta, Verde 3	Goals	Lisunova 6	Olymp Swimming Pool; Referees: Birri (HUN), Peila (USA)

Quarterfinal

12 July 2013; 17:00	Report	Italy	13–7	Australia	Burevestnik Swimming Pool; Referees: Deslieres (CAN), Vasenin (RUS)
12 July 2013; 17:00	Report	Score by quarters: 2–0, 4–2, 4–3, 3–2			Burevestnik Swimming Pool; Referees: Deslieres (CAN), Vasenin (RUS)
12 July 2013; 17:00	Report	Bartolini, Barzon 3	Goals	Colenso 3	Burevestnik Swimming Pool; Referees: Deslieres (CAN), Vasenin (RUS)

semifinal

14 July 2013; 18:30	Report	Russia	14–7	Italy	Burevestnik Swimming Pool; Referees: David (FRA), Peila (USA)
14 July 2013; 18:30	Report	Score by quarters: 6–1, 2–1, 4–2, 2–3			Burevestnik Swimming Pool; Referees: David (FRA), Peila (USA)
14 July 2013; 18:30	Report	Prokofyeva 5	Goals	Savioli 3	Burevestnik Swimming Pool; Referees: David (FRA), Peila (USA)

Gold Medal Match

16 July 2013; 19:45	Report	Russia	18–11	Hungary	Burevestnik Swimming Pool; Referees: Mebuke (GEO), Deslieres (CAN)
16 July 2013; 19:45	Report	Score by quarters: 6–4, 6–2, 1–1, 5–4			Burevestnik Swimming Pool; Referees: Mebuke (GEO), Deslieres (CAN)
16 July 2013; 19:45	Report	Lisunova 6	Goals	Kisteleki 4	Burevestnik Swimming Pool; Referees: Mebuke (GEO), Deslieres (CAN)

== Weightlifting ==
Men

Athlete	Event	Snatch		Clean & Jerk		Total	Rank
Athlete	Event	Result	Rank	Result	Rank	Total	Rank
Khomyakov Dmitriy	77 kg	163	1	188	4	351	4
Apti Aukhadov	85 kg	167	2	205	1	372	1st place, gold medalist(s)
Artem Okulov	85 kg	168	1	203	2	371	2nd place, silver medalist(s)
Aleksandr Ivanov	94 kg	181	1	214	1	395	1st place, gold medalist(s)
Andrey Demanov	105 kg	183	2	223	2	406	2nd place, silver medalist(s)
David Bedzhanyan	105 kg	179	4	224	1	403	3rd place, bronze medalist(s)
Magomed abuev	+105 kg	197	2	230	3	427	3rd place, bronze medalist(s)

Women

Athlete	Event	Snatch		Clean & Jerk		Total	Rank
Athlete	Event	Result	Rank	Result	Rank	Total	Rank
Diana Akhmetova	63 kg	105	1	120	4	225	4
Nadezda Lomova	63 kg	101	3	117	5	218	5
Oksana Slivenko	69 kg	107	1	136	1	242	1st place, gold medalist(s)
Olga Zubova	75 kg	120	2	159	1	279	1st place, gold medalist(s)
Nadezhda Evstyukhina	75 kg	123	1	155	2	278	2nd place, silver medalist(s)
Tatiana Kashirina	+75 kg	142	1	177	1	319	1st place, gold medalist(s)

== See also ==
- Sport in Russia
