= Sweden at the 2013 Summer Universiade =

- IOC code: SWE

in Kazan
- Competitors: 61
- Flag bearer: Danielle Hamilton Carter
- Officials: 39
- Medals: Gold 0 Silver 0 Bronze 0 Total 0

Summer Universiade appearances
- 1959; 1961; 1963; 1965; 1967; 1970; 1973; 1975; 1977; 1979; 1981; 1983; 1985; 1987; 1989; 1991; 1993; 1995; 1997; 1999; 2001; 2003; 2005; 2007; 2009; 2011; 2013; 2015; 2017; 2019; 2021; 2025; 2027

Sweden competed at the 2013 Summer Universiade in Kazan, Russia from 6 to 17 July 2013.

== Athletics ==
Track & road events

Athlete	Event	Heat		Semifinal		Final	
Athlete	Event	Result	Rank	Result	Rank	Result	Rank
Johan Svensson	Men's 800 m	1:52.04	8 Q	1:50.16	14	did not advance	
David Nilsson	Men's 10,000 m	—N/a				30:46.76	12
Alexander Brorsson	Men's 110 m hurdles	13.97	10	—N/a		did not advance	
Niclas Åkerström	Men's 400 m hurdles	52.45	17 Q	did not finish		did not advance	
Fredrik Johansson	Men's 3000 m steeple	9:00.36	12 q	—N/a		9:03.51	11
Daniel Lundgren	Men's 3000 m steeple	9:22.33	17	—N/a		did not advance	
David Nilsson	Men's half marathon	—N/a				1:08:58	26
Andreas Åhwall	Men's half marathon	—N/a				1:11:20	34
Ato Ibáñez	Men's 20 km walk	—N/a				1:25:39	11
Perseus Karlström	Men's 20 km walk	—N/a				1:30:19	20

Field events

Athlete	Event	Qualification		Final	
Athlete	Event	Distance	Position	Distance	Position
Jakob Thorvaldsson	Men's high jump	2.10	22	did not advance	
Olof Hansson	Men's javelin throw	65.41	22	did not advance	
Sofie Skoog	Women's high jump	1.80	11 q	1.84	9
Frida Åkerström	Women's shot put	14.78	13	did not advance	
Elisabeth Höglund	Women's javelin throw	—N/a		46.36	7

== Badminton ==
Athlete	Event	Preliminary round	Second round	Round of 16	Quarterfinals	Semifinals	Final	
Athlete	Event	Opposition Score	Opposition Score	Opposition Score	Opposition Score	Opposition Score	Opposition Score	Rank
Andreas Nilsson	Men's singles	Parakhodin (RUS); L 16–21, 20–22	did not advance					33
Karolina Kotte	Women's singles	Slee (AUS); W 21–17, 21–11	Polikarpova (RUS); L 10–21, 7–21	did not advance				17

== Basketball ==
=== Men's tournament ===
Players: Alexander Lindqvist, Gustav Sundström, Andreas Karlsson, Johan Rönström, Andreas Person, Mike Joseph, Charles Barton JR, Odin Lindell, Chris Czerapowicz, Pierre Hampton, Christopher Ryan, Richard Hartman, Erkan Inan, Sebastian Norman

Preliminary round

Team	Pld	W	L	PF	PA	PD	Pts
Canada	5	5	0	494	336	+158	10
Australia	5	4	1	462	329	+133	9
United States	5	3	2	488	351	+137	8
Czech Republic	5	2	3	331	385	−54	7
Sweden	5	1	4	329	371	−42	6
United Arab Emirates	5	0	5	255	587	−332	5

7 July 2013
20:30

Report

Canada	84–69	Sweden
Scoring by quarter: 19–10, 24–15, 19–26, 22–18

Miras Sports Complex

8 July 2013
12:30

Report

Australia	70–53	Sweden
Scoring by quarter: 13–12, 16–7, 19–14, 22–20

Miras Sports Complex

10 July 2013
21:00

Report

United States	83–65	Sweden
Scoring by quarter: 18–17, 19–10, 27–17, 19–21

Basket Hall

11 July 2013
10:00

Report

United Arab Emirates	69–79	Sweden
Scoring by quarter: 13–20, 16–16, 18–22, 22–21

Miras Sports Complex

12 July 2013
12:30

Report

Czech Republic	65–63	Sweden
Scoring by quarter: 18–15, 14–17, 21–14, 12–17

Olymp Sport Hall

17th–24th place game

14 July 2013
10:00

Report

Sweden	80–49	Chile
Scoring by quarter: 15–6, 17–13, 26–10, 22–20

Basket Hall

17th–20th place game

15 July 2013
18:00

Report

Ukraine	73–75	Sweden
Scoring by quarter: 16–16, 25–20, 16–16, 16–23

Olymp Sport Hall

17th place game

16 July 2013
10:00

Report

Sweden	62–50	Japan
Scoring by quarter: 16–6, 17–15, 15–15, 14–14

Basket Hall

=== Women's tournament ===
Players: Binta Drammeh, Danielle Hamilton Carter, Hanna Isaksson, Josefin Loob, Kalis Loyd, Katarina Milenkovic, Kristina Nybom, Louise Angel, Maria Gültekin, Martina Stålvant, Paula Juhlin, Pernilla Hansson, Salome Kabengano, Tilde Ahlin

Preliminary round

Team	Pld	W	L	PF	PA	PD	Pts
Russia	3	3	0	271	128	+143	6
Sweden	3	2	1	232	143	+89	5
Poland	3	1	2	202	187	+15	4
Mongolia	3	0	3	88	335	−247	3

8 July 2013
20:30

Report

Sweden	69–48	Poland
Scoring by quarter: 23–6, 22–15, 7–15, 17–12

Basket Hall

9 July 2013
20:30

Report

Sweden	95–21	Mongolia
Scoring by quarter: 25–0, 21–9, 26–6, 23–6

Basket Hall

10 July 2013
18:30

Report

Russia	74–68	Sweden
Scoring by quarter: 18–13, 15–20, 19–22, 22–13

Basket Hall

Quarterfinal

12 July 2013
10:30

Report

United States	103–72	Sweden
Scoring by quarter: 26–24, 25–16, 24–16, 28–16

Basket Hall

5th–8th place game

13 July 2013
13:00

Report

Sweden	75–72 (OT)	Canada
Scoring by quarter: 15–20, 10–17, 22–6, 19–23, Overtime: 9–6

Basket Hall

5th place game

15 July 2013
12:30

Report

Sweden	72–63	Czech Republic
Scoring by quarter: 24–14, 11–13, 9–17, 28–19

Basket Hall

== Fencing ==
Athlete	Event	Pool games						Round of 64	Round of 32	Round of 16	Quarterfinal	Semifinal	Final / BM	Rank
Athlete	Event	Opposition Score	Opposition Score	Opposition Score	Opposition Score	Opposition Score	Opposition Score	Opposition Score	Opposition Score	Opposition Score	Opposition Score	Opposition Score	Opposition Score	Rank
Erik Bergdahl	Men's individual épée	Beskin (ISR); L 3–5	Chen (CHN); L 1–5	Anokhin (RUS); W 5–2	Seng Ng (SIN); W 5–4	Grysanov (KAZ); W 5–2	Uyama (JPN); L 4–5	Sjanita (LAT); W 15–9	Peterdi (HUN); W 14–15	did not advance				27
Robin Kase	Men's individual épée	Alvarez (CUB); L 3–5	Yarinovski (ISR); W 5–3	Pokorny (CZE); L 2–5	Herben (NOR); W 5–4	Kurbanov (KAZ); L 3–5	—N/a	Hanczvikkel (HUN); W 15–13	Dong (CHN); L 8–15	did not advance				24
Sanne Gars	Women's individual épée	Mallo (FRA); W 5–4	Mao (SIN); W 5–1	Holmes (USA); W 3–2	London (ISR); L 4–5	Kock (FIN); W 5–4	Mosler (POL); W 5–4	Stähli (SUI); L 12–15	did not advance					
Jannica Vestergård	Women's individual épée	Goh (SIN); L 1–2	Baranikova (SVK); L 4–5	Ndolo (GER); L 1–5	Balaganskaya (KAZ); W 5–3	Kryvytska (UKR); L 4–5	Severson (USA); L 2–5	did not advance						

== Judo ==
Athlete	Event	Round of 32	Round of 16	Quarterfinals	Semifinals	Repechage	Bronze medal	Final	
Athlete	Event	Opposition Result	Opposition Result	Opposition Result	Opposition Result	Opposition Result	Opposition Result	Opposition Result	Rank
Alexander Lundqvist	Men's 60 kg								
Mikaela Beirath	Women's 57 kg	Beldiagina (KGZ); W 1000–0010	Tsolani (GRE); L 0010–0001	did not advance					

== Swimming ==
Athlete	Event	Heat		Semifinal		Final	
Athlete	Event	Time	Rank	Time	Rank	Time	Rank
Kristian Kron	Men's 100 m backstroke	57.70	34	did not advance			
Kristian Kron	Men's 200 m backstroke	2:03.22	14 Q	2:02.96	15	did not advance	
Kristian Kron	Men's 200 m medley						
Kristian Kron	Men's 400 m medley	4:34.47	23	—N/a		did not advance	
Henrik Lindau	Men's 50 m freestyle						
Henrik Lindau	Men's 100 m freestyle						
Henrik Lindau	Men's 100 m backstroke						
Henrik Lindau	Men's 50 m butterfly						
Henrik Lindau	Men's 100 m butterfly						
Erik Persson	Men's 200 m breaststroke						
Erik Persson	Men's 200 m medley						
Erik Persson	Men's 400 m medley						
Jessica Eriksson	Women's 50 m breaststroke						
Jessica Eriksson	Women's 100 m breaststroke						
Jessica Eriksson	Women's 200 m breaststroke						
Nathalie Lindborg	Women's 50 m freestyle						
Nathalie Lindborg	Women's 100 m freestyle						
Josefin Lindqvist	Women's 50 m freestyle						
Josefin Lindqvist	Women's 100 m freestyle						
Josefin Lindqvist	Women's 50 m butterfly						
Henriette Stenqvist	Women's 400 m freestyle						
Henriette Stenqvist	Women's 200 m backstroke						
Emma Svensson	Women's 50 m freestyle						
Emma Svensson	Women's 100 m freestyle						
Emma Svensson	Women's 50 m backstroke						
Emma Svensson	Women's 100 m backstroke						

== Table tennis ==
Athlete	Event	Round of 32	Round of 16	Quarterfinals	Semifinals	Final	
Athlete	Event	Opposition Score	Opposition Score	Opposition Score	Opposition Score	Opposition Score	Rank
Gustaf Ericson	Men's singles						
Johan Rosenberg	Men's singles						
Martin Singh	Men's singles						
Gustaf Ericson; Johan Rosenberg	Men's Doubles	—N/a					
Gustaf Ericson; Johan Rosenberg; Martin Singh	Men's team	—N/a					

== Weightlifting ==
Athlete	Event	Snatch		Clean & Jerk		Total	Rank
Athlete	Event	Result	Rank	Result	Rank	Total	Rank
Angelica Roos	Women's 58 kg	78	10	103	8	181	9
Carita Hansson	Women's 69 kg	88	8	105	10	193	9
