= Tennis at the 2013 Summer Universiade – Women's singles =

Women's singles
- Tennis at the 2013 Summer Universiade

Final
- Champion: Sachie Ishizu (JPN)
- Runner-up: Sabrina Santamaria (USA)
- Score: 6–2, 7–5

Events
| Singles | men | women |
| Doubles | men | women | mixed |
| Team | men | women |
- Summer Universiade

The women's singles tennis event at the 2013 Summer Universiade was held from July 8 to 16, 2013 at the Tennis Academy in Kazan, Russia.

== Seeds ==
All seeds receive a bye into the second round.

1. Yaroslava Shvedova (KAZ) (withdrew)
2. Luksika Kumkhum (THA) (second round)
3. Ilona Kremen (BLR) (quarterfinals)
4. Nudnida Luangnam (THA) (quarterfinals)
5. Sachie Ishizu (JPN) (champion, gold medallist)
6. Laura Siegemund (GER) (quarterfinals)
7. Kateřina Vaňková (CZE) (semifinals)
8. Margarita Gasparyan (RUS) (fourth round)
9. Kateřina Kramperová (CZE) (fourth round)
10. Alison Bai (AUS) (fourth round)
11. Ekaterina Yashina (RUS) (fourth round)
12. Han Sung-hee (KOR) (third round)
13. Sylwia Zagórska (POL) (fourth round)
14. Karin Morgošová (SVK) (fourth round)
15. Hsu Wen-hsin (TPE) (fourth round)
16. Juan Ting-fei (TPE) (first round)

== Draw ==
Key

- Q = Qualifier
- WC = Wild card
- LL = Lucky loser
- Alt = Alternate
- ITF = ITF entry
- PR = Protected ranking
- SR = Special ranking
- SE = Special exempt
- JE = Junior exempt
- JR = Junior Accelerator Programme entrant
- CO = College Accelerator Programme entrant
- NG = Next Gen Accelerator Program entrant
- w/o = Walkover
- r = Retired
- d = Defaulted

=== Finals ===
Quarterfinals
Anna Fitzpatrick (GBR) | 1 | 0
7 | Kateřina Vaňková (CZE) | 6 | 6
4 | Nudnida Luangnam (THA) | 1 | 1
5 | Sachie Ishizu (JPN) | 6 | 6
Hiroko Kuwata (JPN) | 6 | 6
3 | Ilona Kremen (BLR) | 1 | 4
6 | Laura Siegemund (GER) | 6^{2} | 2
Sabrina Santamaria (USA) | 7^{7} | 6

Semifinals
7 | Kateřina Vaňková (CZE) | 3 | 0
5 | Sachie Ishizu (JPN) | 6 | 6
Hiroko Kuwata (JPN) | 2 | 2
Sabrina Santamaria (USA) | 6 | 6

Final (gold-medal match)
5 | Sachie Ishizu (JPN) | 6 | 7
Sabrina Santamaria (USA) | 2 | 5

=== Top half ===
==== Section 1 ====
First round

Second round
1 | Y Shvedova (KAZ)
M Grgan (SLO) | w/o
C Melita (INA) | 6 | 6
HF Honiball (NAM) | 1 | 2
A Fitzpatrick (GBR) | 6 | 6
MF Nyakudzuka (ZIM) | 0 | 0
A van Cauter (FRA) | 6 | 3 | 6
16 | T-f Juan (TPE) | 3 | 6 | 0

Third round
M Grgan (SLO) | 1 | 3
C Melita (INA) | 6 | 6
A Fitzpatrick (GBR) | 6 | 6
A van Cauter (FRA) | 3 | 3

Fourth round
CM Setyawan (INA) | 1 | 4
A Fitzpatrick (GBR) | 6 | 6

==== Section 2 ====
First round
M Dimingo (ZAM) | 1 | 0
Fe Chiaparini (BRA) | 6 | 6

Second round
11 | E Yashina (RUS) | 4 | 6 | 6
MG Olmos Dick (MEX) | 6 | 4 | 4
J Noordin (MAS) | 2 | 3
H-C Wu (HKG) | 6 | 6
R Ntembe (UGA)
KL Saar (EST) | w/o
Fe Chiaparini (BRA) | 0 | 1
7 | K Vaňková (CZE) | 6 | 6

Third round
11 | E Yashina (RUS) | 7^{7} | 6
H-c Wu (HKG) | 6^{4} | 4
KL Saar (EST) | 1 | 1
7 | K Vaňková (CZE) | 6 | 6

Fourth round
11 | E Yashina (RUS) | 3 | 2
7 | K Vaňková (CZE) | 6 | 6

==== Section 3 ====
First round
A Prenko (TKM) | 6 | 6
J Chapomba (MAW) | 1 | 0

Second round
4 | N Luangnam (THA) | 6 | 6
R Sabay (GER) | 3 | 4
G Desimone (USA) | 6 | 6
J Korolova (LAT) | 1 | 0
D Lebesheva (BLR) | 6 | 6
N Li (CHN) | 2 | 2
A Prenko (TKM) | 1 | 1
14 | K Morgošová (SVK) | 6 | 6

Third round
4 | N Luangnam (THA) | 6 | 6
G Desimone (USA) | 2 | 4
D Lebesheva (BLR) | 6 | 2 | 3
14 | K Morgošová (SVK) | 3 | 6 | 6

Fourth round
4 | N Luangnam (THA) | 7 | 6
14 | K Morgošová (SVK) | 5 | 0

==== Section 4 ====
First round

Second round
10 | A Bai (AUS) | 6 | 6
J Altansarnai (MGL) | 4 | 0
C Munasinghe (SRI) | 0 | 1
B Sobaszkiewicz (POL) | 6 | 6
M-r Ham (KOR) | 6 | 6
D Harmath (CAN) | 2 | 0
E Balanga (PHI) | 0 | 1
5 | S Ishizu (JPN) | 6 | 6

Third round
10 | A Bai (AUS) | 6 | 6
B Sobaszkiewicz (POL) | 2 | 4
M-r Ham (KOR) | 1 | 1
5 | S Ishizu (JPN) | 6 | 6

Fourth round
10 | A Bai (AUS) | 1 | 2
5 | S Ishizu (JPN) | 6 | 6

=== Bottom half ===
==== Section 5 ====
First round
A Mazorodze (ZIM) | 1 | 0
L Godinet (ASA) | 6 | 6

Second round
8 | M Gasparyan (RUS) | 6 | 6
K Kirthsinhe (SRI) | 0 | 0
TR Amalia (INA) | 2 | 3
B Jozami (ARG) | 6 | 6
H Kuwata (JPN) | 6 | 6
P Vollmeier (SLO) | 1 | 0
L Godinet (ASA) | 0 | 0
12 | S-h Han (KOR) | 6 | 6

Third round
8 | M Gasparyan (RUS) | 6 | 6
B Jozami (ARG) | 2 | 2
H Kuwata (JPN) | 6 | 6
12 | S-h Han (KOR) | 3 | 2

Fourth round
8 | M Gasparyan (RUS) | 6 | 5 | 5
H Kuwata (JPN) | 3 | 7 | 7

==== Section 6 ====
First round
I Jagau (NAM) | w/o
H Nanyingi (UGA)

Second round
13 | S Zagórska (POL) | 4 | 6 | 6
E Pellegrinelli (FRA) | 6 | 4 | 3
H Andriamananarivo (MAD) | 0 | 5
N Vajdová (SVK) | 6 | 7
J Hatamleh (JOR) | 6 | 6
II Chilamwa (MAW) | 4 | 2
I Jagau (NAM) | 1 | 0
3 | I Kremen (BLR) | 6 | 6

Third round
13 | S Zagórska (POL) | 6 | 6
N Vajdová (SVK) | 3 | 2
J Hatamleh (JOR) | 0 | 1
3 | I Kremen (BLR) | 6 | 6

Fourth round
13 | S Zagórska (POL) | 5 | 4
3 | I Kremen (BLR) | 7 | 6

==== Section 7 ====
First round
Y-t Ki (HKG) | 2 | 1
A Guzman Rivas (MEX) | 6 | 6

Second round
6 | L Siegemund (GER) | 6 | 6
K Sanjevic (CAN) | 1 | 0
P Sunić (CRO) | 6 | 6
G Piven (UKR) | 1 | 2
Y Yang (CHN) | 6 | 6
D Gotov (MGL) | 0 | 0
A Guzman Rivas (MEX) | 1 | 4
9 | K Kramperová (CZE) | 6 | 6

Third round
6 | L Siegemund (GER) | 6 | 6
P Sunić (CRO) | 2 | 2
Y Yang (CHN) | 6 | 5 | 0
9 | K Kramperová (CZE) | 3 | 7 | 6

Fourth round
6 | L Siegemund (GER) | 6 | 6
9 | K Kramperová (CZE) | 0 | 1

==== Section 8 ====
First round
S Santamaria (USA) | 6 | 6
Fa Chiaparini (BRA) | 1 | 0

Second round
15 | W-h Hsu (TPE) | 6 | 6
M Mammetgulyyeva (TKM) | 0 | 1
SL Shio Ling (MAS) | 1 | 0
L Sabino (SUI) | 6 | 6
D Borthwick (GBR) | 6 | 6
N Banks (ANT) | 0 | 0
S Santamaria (USA) | 7 | 7
2 | L Kumkhum (THA) | 5 | 5

Third round
15 | W-h Hsu (TPE) | 2 | 6 | 6
L Sabino (SUI) | 6 | 1 | 2
D Borthwick (GBR) | 0 | 2
S Santamaria (USA) | 6 | 6

Fourth round
15 | W-h Hsu (TPE) | 6 | 1 | 4
S Santamaria (USA) | 3 | 6 | 6

== Consolation draw ==
=== Consolation finals ===
Semifinals
1 | Yuuki Tanaka (JPN) | 6^{1} | 7 | [10]
Dominique Harmath (CAN) | 7^{7} | 5 | [5]
3 | Megumi Nishimoto (JPN) | 4 | 6 | [10]
Kristina Sanjevic (CAN) | 6 | 3 | [6]

Final
1 | Yuuki Tanaka (JPN) | 6 | 6
Megumi Nishimoto (JPN) | 1 | 4

=== Consolation main draw ===
==== Top half ====
First round
J Korolova (LAT) | w/o
D Kirthisinghe (SRI)
J Chapomba (MAW)
L Lin (CHN) | w/o
A Mazorodze (ZIM) | 0 | 0
R Meng (CHN) | 6 | 6
2 | N Banks (ANT) | 0 | 0
4 | D Harmath (CAN) | 6 | 6

Second round
1 | Y Tanaka (JPN) | w/o
J Korolova (LAT)
L Lin (CHN) | 6^{2} | 0
TR Amalia (INA) | 7^{7} | 6
E Yates (USA) | 6 | 6
R Meng (CHN) | 1 | 2
D Harmath (CAN) | w/o
HF Honiball (NAM)

Quarterfinals
1 | Y Tanaka (JPN) | 6 | 6
TR Amalia (INA) | 2 | 0
E Yates (USA) | 2 | 2
D Harmath (CAN) | 6 | 6

Semifinals
Y Tanaka (JPN) | 6^{1} | 7 | [10]
D Harmath (CAN) | 7^{7} | 5 | 5

==== Bottom half ====
First round
3 | CE Rustscheff (CAN) | 6 | 6
II Chilamwa (MAW) | 0 | 0
D Gotov (MGL) | 1 | 1
Y-t Ki (HKG) | 6 | 6
N Li (CHN)
SL Shio Ling (MAS) | w/o
K Christian (USA) | 2 | 2
K Sanjevic (CAN) | 6 | 6
H Andriamananarivo (MAD) | 6 | 6
CL Moolman (NAM) | 2 | 0

Second round
3 | CE Rustscheff (CAN) | 4 | 4
Y-t Ki (HKG) | 6 | 6
SL Shio Ling (MAS) | 0 | 0
3 | M Nishimoto (JPN) | 6 | 6
E Pellegrinelli (FRA) | 4 | 1
K Sanjevic (CAN) | 6 | 6
H Andriamananarivo (MAD) | 6 | 6
2 | M Dimingo (ZAM) | 0 | 0

Quarterfinals
Y-t Ki (HKG) | 0 | 0
3 | M Nishimoto (JPN) | 6 | 6
K Sanjevic (CAN) | 6 | 6
H Andriamananarivo (MAD) | 4 | 2

Semifinals
3 | M Nishimoto (JPN) | 4 | 6 | [10]
K Sanjevic (CAN) | 6 | 3 | 6
