= Tennis at the 2013 Summer Universiade – Women's doubles =

Women's doubles
- Tennis at the 2013 Summer Universiade

Final
- Champions: Anastasia Pavlyuchenkova (RUS); Elena Vesnina (RUS)
- Runners-up: Noppawan Lertcheewakarn (THA); Varatchaya Wongteanchai (THA)
- Score: 6–4, 6–3

Events
Singles	men	women
Doubles	men	women	mixed
Team	men	women
← 2011 ·	Summer Universiade	· 2015 →

The women's doubles tennis event at the 2013 Summer Universiade was held from July 8 to 16 at the Tennis Academy in Kazan, Russia.

== Seeds ==
The first four seeds receive a bye into the second round.

1. Anastasia Pavlyuchenkova (RUS) / Elena Vesnina (RUS) (champions, gold medallists)
2. Noppawan Lertcheewakarn (THA) / Varatchaya Wongteanchai (THA) (final, silver medallists)
3. Hsieh Shu-ying (TPE) / Hsu Wen-hsin (TPE) (quarterfinals)
4. Darya Lebesheva (BLR) / Polina Pekhova (BLR) (semifinals, bronze medallists)
5. Sachie Ishizu (JPN) / Yuuki Tanaka (JPN) (quarterfinals)
6. Barbara Sobaszkiewicz (POL) / Sylwia Zagórska (POL) (semifinals, bronze medallists)
7. Kateřina Kramperová (CZE) / Kateřina Vaňková (CZE) (second round)
8. Han Sung-hee (KOR) / Yu Min-hwa (KOR) (first round)

== Draw ==
=== Key ===
- Q = Qualifier
- WC = Wild card
- LL = Lucky loser
- Alt = Alternate
- ITF = ITF entry
- PR = Protected ranking
- SR = Special ranking
- SE = Special exempt
- JE = Junior exempt
- JR = Junior Accelerator Programme entrant
- CO = College Accelerator Programme entrant
- NG = Next Gen Accelerator Program entrant
- w/o = Walkover
- r = Retired
- d = Defaulted

=== Finals ===
Semifinals
1	Anastasia Pavlyuchenkova (RUS); Elena Vesnina (RUS)	6	6
4	Darya Lebesheva (BLR); Polina Pekhova (BLR)	1	1
6	Barbara Sobaszkiewicz (POL); Sylwia Zagórska (POL)	1	0
2	Noppawan Lertcheewakarn (THA); Varatchaya Wongteanchai (THA)	6	6

Final
1	Anastasia Pavlyuchenkova (RUS); Elena Vesnina (RUS)	6	6
2	Noppawan Lertcheewakarn (THA); Varatchaya Wongteanchai (THA)	4	3

=== Top half ===
First round
B Jozami (ARG); MS Jozami (ARG)	3	4
M Grgan (SLO); P Vollmeier (SLO)	6	6
Fa Chiaparini (BRA); Fe Chiaparini (BRA)	6	6
C Rustscheff (CAN); K Sanjevic (CAN)	3	2
K Christian (USA); S Santamaria (USA)	6	6
8	S-h Han (KOR); M-h Yu (KOR)	2	4
A Mazorodze (ZIM); MF Nyakudzuka (ZIM)	0	1
J Noordin (MAS); SL Shio Ling (MAS)	6	6
Y-t Ki (HKG); H-c Wu (HKG)	2	4
R Meng (CHN); Y Yang (CHN)	6	6
TR Amalia (INA); C Melita (INA)	6^{4}	3
7	K Kramperová (CZE); K Vaňková (CZE)	7^{7}	6

Second round
1	A Pavlyuchenkova (RUS); E Vesnina (RUS)	6	6
M Grgan (SLO); P Vollmeier (SLO)	1	2
Fa Chiaparini (BRA); Fe Chiaparini (BRA)	0	1
K Christian (USA); S Santamaria (USA)	6	6
4	D Lebesheva (BLR); P Pekhova (BLR)	6	6
J Noordin (MAS); SL Shio Ling (MAS)	0	3
R Meng (CHN); Y Yang (CHN)	6	6
7	K Kramperová (CZE); K Vaňková (CZE)	1	4

Quarterfinals
1	A Pavlyuchenkova (RUS); E Vesnina (RUS)	6	6
K Christian (USA); S Santamaria (USA)	4	3
4	D Lebesheva (BLR); P Pekhova (BLR)	6	6
R Meng (CHN); Y Yang (CHN)	0	0

Semifinals
1	A Pavlyuchenkova (RUS); E Vesnina (RUS)	6	6
4	D Lebesheva (BLR); P Pekhova (BLR)	1	1

=== Bottom half ===
First round
6	B Sobaszkiewicz (POL); S Zagórska (POL)	6	6
KA Kirthsinhe (SRI); C Munasinghe (SRI)	0	0
AP de la Peña Rosas (MEX); MG Olmos Dick (MEX)	6	6
J Chapomba (MAW); II Chilamwa (MAW)	0	0
HF Honiball (NAM); I Jagau (NAM)	0	4
D Borthwick (GBR); A Elliott (GBR)	6	6
5	S Ishizu (JPN); Y Tanaka (JPN)	6	7
R Sabay (GER); L Siegemund (GER)	4	5
M Mammetgulyyeva (TKM); A Prenko (TKM)	0	4
K Morgošová (SVK); N Vajdová (SVK)	6	6
J Altansarnai (MGL); D Gotov (MGL)	4	3
E Pellegrinelli (FRA); A van Cauter (FRA)	6	6

Second round
6	B Sobaszkiewicz (POL); S Zagórska (POL)	6	7^{7}
AP de la Peña Rosas (MEX); MG Olmos Dick (MEX)	3	6^{2}
D Borthwick (GBR); A Elliott (GBR)	6	2	[8]
3	S-y Hsieh (TPE); W-h Hsu (TPE)	2	6	[10]
5	S Ishizu (JPN); Y Tanaka (JPN)	6	6
K Morgošová (SVK); N Vajdová (SVK)	1	1
E Pellegrinelli (FRA); A van Cauter (FRA)	1	0
2	N Lertcheewakarn (THA); V Wongteanchai (THA)	6	6

Quarterfinals
6	B Sobaszkiewicz (POL); S Zagórska (POL)	7^{7}	6
3	S-y Hsieh (TPE); W-h Hsu (TPE)	6^{5}	3
5	S Ishizu (JPN); Y Tanaka (JPN)	6	3	[4]
2	N Lertcheewakarn (THA); V Wongteanchai (THA)	3	6	[10]

Semifinals
6	B Sobaszkiewicz (POL); S Zagórska (POL)	1	0
2	N Lertcheewakarn (THA); V Wongteanchai (THA)	6	6
