= Tennis at the 2013 Summer Universiade =

- Date: 8–16 July
- Edition: 16
- Location: Tennis Academy, Kazan

Champions

Men's singles
- Lim Yong-kyu (KOR)

Women's singles
- Sachie Ishizu (JPN)

Men's doubles
- Lee Hsin-han / Peng Hsien-yin (TPE)

Women's doubles
- Anastasia Pavlyuchenkova / Elena Vesnina (RUS)

Mixed doubles
- Elena Vesnina / Andrey Kuznetsov (RUS)

Men's team
- South Korea (KOR)

Women's team
- Japan (JPN)
- Summer Universiade

Tennis was contested at the 2013 Summer Universiade from July 8 to 16 at the Tennis Academy in Kazan, Russia. Men's and women's singles, men's and women's team, and men's, women's, and mixed doubles events was contested.

== Medal summary ==
=== Medal table ===
Rank	Nation	Gold	Silver	Bronze	Total
1	Russia (RUS)*	2	2	2	6
2	Japan (JPN)	2	1	1	4
3	South Korea (KOR)	2	0	1	3
4	Chinese Taipei (TPE)	1	1	1	3
5	United States (USA)	0	1	1	2
6	Madagascar (MAD)	0	1	0	1
6	Thailand (THA)	0	1	0	1
8	Belarus (BLR)	0	0	2	2
9	Czech Republic (CZE)	0	0	1	1
9	France (FRA)	0	0	1	1
9	Poland (POL)	0	0	1	1
9	Switzerland (SUI)	0	0	1	1
Totals (12 entries)		7	7	12	26

=== Medal events ===
Event	Gold	Silver	Bronze
Men's singles	Lim Yong-kyu; South Korea	Antso Rakotondramanga; Madagascar	Konstantin Kravchuk; Russia
Men's singles	Lim Yong-kyu; South Korea	Antso Rakotondramanga; Madagascar	Maxime Quinqueneau; France
Women's singles	Sachie Ishizu; Japan	Sabrina Santamaria; United States	Kateřina Vaňková; Czech Republic
Women's singles	Sachie Ishizu; Japan	Sabrina Santamaria; United States	Hiroko Kuwata; Japan
Men's doubles	Lee Hsin-han and Peng Hsien-yin; Chinese Taipei	Victor Baluda and Konstantin Kravchuk; Russia	Lim Yong-kyu and Noh Sang-woo; South Korea
Men's doubles	Lee Hsin-han and Peng Hsien-yin; Chinese Taipei	Victor Baluda and Konstantin Kravchuk; Russia	Aliaksandr Bury and Andrei Vasilevski; Belarus
Women's doubles	Anastasia Pavlyuchenkova and Elena Vesnina; Russia	Noppawan Lertcheewakarn and Varatchaya Wongteanchai; Thailand	Darya Lebesheva and Polina Pekhova; Belarus
Women's doubles	Anastasia Pavlyuchenkova and Elena Vesnina; Russia	Noppawan Lertcheewakarn and Varatchaya Wongteanchai; Thailand	Barbara Sobaszkiewicz and Sylwia Zagórska; Poland
Mixed doubles	Elena Vesnina and Andrey Kuznetsov; Russia	Hiroko Kuwata and Shota Tagawa; Japan	Patrick Olivier Eichenberger and Lisa Sabino; Switzerland
Mixed doubles	Elena Vesnina and Andrey Kuznetsov; Russia	Hiroko Kuwata and Shota Tagawa; Japan	Lee Hsin-han and Lee Hua-chen; Chinese Taipei
Men's team	South Korea (KOR); Lim Yong-kyu; Noh Sang-woo; Lee Jea-moon	Chinese Taipei (TPE); Lee Hsin-han; Peng Hsien-yin; Huang Liang-chi; Wang Chieh-fu	Russia (RUS); Konstantin Kravchuk; Victor Baluda
Women's team	Japan (JPN); Sachie Ishizu; Hiroko Kuwata; Yuki Tanaka	Russia (RUS); Anastasia Pavlyuchenkova; Elena Vesnina; Ekaterina Yashina; Margarita Gasparyan	United States (USA); Sabrina Santamaria; Kaitlyn Christian

== See also ==
- Tennis at the Summer Universiade
