= Tennis at the 2013 Summer Universiade – Mixed doubles =

Mixed doubles
- Tennis at the 2013 Summer Universiade

Final
- Champions: Andrey Kuznetsov (RUS); Elena Vesnina (RUS)
- Runners-up: Shota Tagawa (JPN); Hiroko Kuwata (JPN)
- Score: 6–4, 3–6, [12–10]

Events
| Singles | men | women |
| Doubles | men | women | mixed |
| Team | men | women |
| ← 2011 · | Summer Universiade | · 2015 → |

The mixed doubles tennis event at the 2013 Summer Universiade was held from July 8 to 16 at the Tennis Academy in Kazan, Russia.

== Seeds ==
The first seed received a bye into the second round.

1. Andrey Kuznetsov (RUS) / Elena Vesnina (RUS) (champions, gold medallists)
2. Lee Hsin-han (TPE) / Lee Hua-chen (TPE) (semifinals, bronze medallists)
3. Andrei Vasilevski (BLR) / Ilona Kremen (BLR) (quarterfinals)
4. Kittiphong Wachiramanowong (THA) / Varatchaya Wongteanchai (THA) (second round)
5. Nam Ji-sung (KOR) / Yu Min-hwa (KOR) (quarterfinals)
6. Shota Tagawa (JPN) / Hiroko Kuwata (JPN) (final, silver medallists)
7. Michal Pažický (SVK) / Karin Morgošová (SVK) (second round)
8. Petr Michnev (CZE) / Kateřina Vaňková (CZE) (second round)

== Draw ==
=== Key ===
- Q = Qualifier
- WC = Wild card
- LL = Lucky loser
- Alt = Alternate
- ITF = ITF entry
- PR = Protected ranking
- SR = Special ranking
- SE = Special exempt
- JE = Junior exempt
- JR = Junior Accelerator Programme entrant
- CO = College Accelerator Programme entrant
- NG = Next Gen Accelerator Program entrant
- w/o = Walkover
- r = Retired
- d = Defaulted

=== Finals ===
Semifinals
1 | Andrey Kuznetsov (RUS); Elena Vesnina (RUS) | 6 | 6
Patrick Olivier Eichenberger (SUI); Lisa Sabino (SUI) | 2 | 3
6 | Shota Tagawa (JPN); Hiroko Kuwata (JPN) | 6 | 6
2 | Lee Hsin-han (TPE); Lee Hua-chen (TPE) | 2 | 2

Final
1 | Andrey Kuznetsov (RUS); Elena Vesnina (RUS) | 6 | 3 | [12]
6 | Shota Tagawa (JPN); Hiroko Kuwata (JPN) | 4 | 6 | [10]

=== Top half ===
First round
SF Lam (HKG); HC Wu (HKG) | 6 | 6
KB Ocampo (PHI); E Balanga (PHI) | 2 | 2
I Juneau (CAN); DM Harmath (CAN) | 6 | 6
V Rakotondramanga (MAD); H Andriamananarivo (MAD) | 4 | 2
J Wiesinger (BRA); F Chiaparini (BRA) | 4 | 1
5 | J-s Nam (KOR); M-h Yu (KOR) | 6 | 6
4 | K Wachiramanowong (THA); V Wongteanchai (THA) | 6 | 6
F Mulenga (ZAM); M Dimingo (ZAM) | 0 | 1
JI Badano (ARG); BA Jozami (ARG) | 3 | 6^{8}
SMA Syed (MAS); J Noordin (MAS) | 6 | 7^{10}
K Thiyambarawatta (SRI); KA Kirthsinhe (SRI)
PO Eichenberger (SUI); L Sabino (SUI) | w/o
J Zavcer (SLO); P Vollmeier (SLO) | 2 | 3
8 | P Michnev (CZE); K Vaňková (CZE) | 6 | 6

Second round
1 | A Kuznetsov (RUS); E Vesnina (RUS) | 6 | 6
SF Lam (HKG); HC Wu (HKG) | 1 | 1
I Juneau (CAN); DM Harmath (CAN) | 6 | 3 | [10]
5 | J-s Nam (KOR); M-h Yu (KOR) | 3 | 6 | [12]
4 | K Wachiramanowong (THA); V Wongteanchai (THA) | 6 | 4 | [8]
SMA Syed (MAS); J Noordin (MAS) | 2 | 6 | [10]
PO Eichenberger (SUI); L Sabino (SUI) | 6 | 6
8 | P Michnev (CZE); K Vaňková (CZE) | 1 | 2

Quarterfinals
1 | A Kuznetsov (RUS); E Vesnina (RUS) | 6 | 6
5 | J-s Nam (KOR); M-h Yu (KOR) | 2 | 4
SMA Syed (MAS); J Noordin (MAS) | 2 | 3
PO Eichenberger (SUI); L Sabino (SUI) | 6 | 6

Semifinals
1 | A Kuznetsov (RUS); E Vesnina (RUS) | 6 | 6
PO Eichenberger (SUI); L Sabino (SUI) | 2 | 3

=== Bottom half ===
First round
6 | S Tagawa (JPN); H Kuwata (JPN) | 6 | 6
J-M Erasmus (NAM); CL Moolman (NAM) | 3 | 4
A Taifour (JOR); J Hatamleh (JOR) | 1 | 2
Y Zhang (CHN); L Lin (CHN) | 6 | 6
A Hoang (FRA); A Van Carter (FRA) | 2 | 2
JP Murra (MEX); AP de la Peña Rosas (MEX) | 6 | 6
A Ernepesov (TKM); A Prenko (TKM) | 2 | 1
3 | A Vasilevski (BLR); I Kremen (BLR) | 6 | 6
7 | M Pažický (SVK); K Morgošová (SVK) | 4 | 6 | [10]
M Deviatiarov (UKR); G Piven (UKR) | 6 | 1 | [7]
D Cochrane (GBR); A Fitzpatrick (GBR) | 6 | 6
M Munkhbayar (MGL); J Altansarnai (MGL) | 3 | 1
J Wang (USA); E Yates (USA) | 6 | 6
T Chitemamwise (ZIM); MF Nyakudzuka (ZIM) | 0 | 0
S Thompson (AUS); A Bai (AUS) | 2 | 3
2 | H-h Lee (TPE); H-c Lee (TPE) | 6 | 6

Second round
6 | S Tagawa (JPN); H Kuwata (JPN) | 6 | 6
Y Zhang (CHN); L Lin (CHN) | 1 | 1
JP Murra (MEX); AP de la Peña Rosas (MEX) | 3 | 1
3 | A Vasilevski (BLR); I Kremen (BLR) | 6 | 6
7 | M Pažický (SVK); K Morgošová (SVK) | 6^{11} | 6^{7}
D Cochrane (GBR); A Fitzpatrick (GBR) | 7^{13} | 7^{9}
J Wang (USA); E Yates (USA) | 1 | 2
2 | H-h Lee (TPE); H-c Lee (TPE) | 6 | 6

Quarterfinals
6 | S Tagawa (JPN); H Kuwata (JPN) | 6 | 6
3 | A Vasilevski (BLR); I Kremen (BLR) | 4 | 3
D Cochrane (GBR); A Fitzpatrick (GBR) | 6 | 5 | [8]
2 | H-h Lee (TPE); H-c Lee (TPE) | 3 | 7 | [10]

Semifinals
6 | S Tagawa (JPN); H Kuwata (JPN) | 6 | 6
2 | H-h Lee (TPE); H-c Lee (TPE) | 2 | 2
