= Shooting at the 2013 Summer Universiade =

Shooting at the XXVII Summer Universiade
- Venue: Rifle Shooting Range; Sviyaga Shooting Range
- Dates: July 12, 2013 – July 17, 2013

Shooting was contested at the 2013 Summer Universiade from July 12 to 17 at the Rifle Shooting Range and the Sviyaga Shooting Range in Kazan, Russia.

== Medal summary ==
=== Medal table ===
Rank	Nation	Gold	Silver	Bronze	Total
1	Russia (RUS)*	12	8	5	25
2	China (CHN)	9	8	10	27
3	Italy (ITA)	3	5	1	9
4	Ukraine (UKR)	2	1	1	4
5	South Korea (KOR)	1	5	3	9
6	Thailand (THA)	1	4	2	7
7	Czech Republic (CZE)	1	1	3	5
8	France (FRA)	1	0	2	3
8	Kazakhstan (KAZ)	1	0	2	3
10	Australia (AUS)	1	0	0	1
10	Germany (GER)	1	0	0	1
10	Japan (JPN)	1	0	0	1
13	Mongolia (MGL)	0	1	1	2
13	Poland (POL)	0	1	1	2
15	Slovakia (SVK)	0	0	2	2
16	Serbia (SRB)	0	0	1	1
Totals (16 entries)		34	34	34	102

=== Men's events ===
==== Individual ====
Event	Gold	Silver	Bronze
10 metre air pistol	Mai Jiajie; China	Pang Wei; China	Pavel Světlík; Czech Republic
10 metre air rifle	Liu Zhiguo; China	Nazar Luginets; Russia	Sergei Kruglov; Russia
25 metre standard pistol	Leonid Yekimov; Russia	Li Yuehong; China	Clement Bessaguet; France
25 metre rapid fire pistol	Boris Artaud; France	Leonid Yekimov; Russia	Ding Feng; China
50 metre pistol	Pang Wei; China	Seo Deok-won; South Korea	Mai Jiajie; China
50 metre rifle prone	Sergey Kamenskiy; Russia	Kang Hongwei; China	Kim Hyeon-jun; South Korea
50 metre rifle three positions	Nazar Luginets; Russia	Kang Hongwei; China	Tomasz Bartnik; Poland
Skeet	Tomáš Nýdrle; Czech Republic	Tammaro Cassandro; Italy	Jakub Tomeček; Czech Republic
Trap	Yuriy Nikandrov; Ukraine	Valerio Grazini; Italy	Simone Prosperi; Italy
Double trap	Antonino Barillà; Italy	Yang Yiyang; China	Mikhail Leibo; Russia

==== Team ====
Event	Gold	Silver	Bronze
10 metre air pistol	South Korea (KOR); Seo Deok-won; Lee Dae-myung; Kim Tae-young	China (CHN); Pang Wei; Mai Jiajie; Guo Xukai	Russia (RUS); Nikola Kilin; Leonid Yekimov; Alexey Yaskevich
10 metre air rifle	China (CHN); Liu Zhiguo; Cao Yifei; Liu Lilong	Russia (RUS); Nazar Luginets; Sergey Kamenskiy; Sergei Kruglov	South Korea (KOR); Park Sung-hyun; Jeon Je-yul; Lee Jea-won
25 metre standard pistol	China (CHN); Li Yuehong; Ding Feng; Pang Wei	Russia (RUS); Leonid Yekimov; Andrey Shchepetkov; Dmitry Brayko	South Korea (KOR); Kim Jun-hong; Choi Yong-hoo; Kim Dae-yoong
25 metre rapid fire pistol	Russia (RUS); Aleksandr Alifirenko; Dmitry Brayko; Leonid Yekimov	South Korea (KOR); Kim Jun-hong; Kim Dae-yoong; Choi Yong-hoo	France (FRA); Boris Artaud; Clement Bessaguet; Thomas Delacourt
50 metre pistol	Russia (RUS); Leonid Yekimov; Nikolai Kilin; Sergei Cherviakovskii	South Korea (KOR); Lee Dae-myung; Seo Deok-won; Jang Jin-hyuk	China (CHN); Mai Jiajie; Pang Wei; Chen Guopeng
50 metre rifle prone	China (CHN); Kang Hongwei; Cao Yifei; Lan Xing	Poland (POL); Tomasz Bartnik; Pawel Pietruk; Bartosz Jasiecki	Russia (RUS); Sergey Kamenskiy; Nazar Luginets; Kirill Grigorian
50 metre rifle three positions	China (CHN); Kang Hongwei; Cao Yifei; Lan Xing	Russia (RUS); Nazar Luginets; Sergei Kruglov; Kirill Grigorian	Serbia (SRB); Igor Čotra; Milutin Stefanović; Borislav Mazinjanin
Skeet	Russia (RUS); Alexander Zemlin; Roman Sentsov; Nikolay Teplyy	Italy (ITA); Marco Sablone; Giancarlo Tazza; Tammaro Cassandro	Czech Republic (CZE); Jakub Novota; Jakub Tomeček; Tomáš Nýdrle
Trap	Italy (ITA); Diego Meoni; Simone Prosperi; Valerio Grazini	Czech Republic (CZE); Martin Dvořák; Radim Sedláček; Jan Privara	Slovakia (SVK); Michal Slamka; Matúš Dudo; Boris Stanko
Double trap	Russia (RUS); Aleksandr Furasev; Artem Nekrasov; Mikhail Leibo	Italy (ITA); Andrea Miotto; Antonino Barillà; Alessandro Chianese	China (CHN); Mo Junjie; Yang Yiyang; Wen Baolu

=== Women's events ===
==== Individual ====
Event	Gold	Silver	Bronze
10 metre air pistol	Liubov Yaskevich; Russia	Tanyaporn Prucksakorn; Thailand	Su Yuling; China
10 metre air rifle	Maren Prediger; Germany	Yu Dan; China	Nandinzaya Gankhuyag; Mongolia
25 metre pistol	Olena Kostevych; Ukraine	Anna Mastianina; Russia	Tanyaporn Prucksakorn; Thailand
50 metre rifle prone	Mai Toishi; Japan	Thanyalak Chotphibunsin; Thailand	Jana Hyblerová; Slovakia
50 metre rifle three positions	Ma Hong; China	Kwon Na-ra; South Korea	Li Peijing; China
Skeet	Isarapa Imprasertsuk; Thailand	Huang Sixue; China	Albina Shakirova; Russia
Trap	Catherine Skinner; Australia	Silvana Stanco; Italy	Zhang Dandan; China

==== Team ====
Event	Gold	Silver	Bronze
10 metre air pistol	Russia (RUS); Liubov Yaskevich; Ekaterina Korshunova; Daria Danilina	South Korea (KOR); Park Ji-won; Park Ye-sol; Cho Mun-hyeon	Thailand (THA); Tanyaporn Prucksakorn; Kanokkan Chaimongkol; Pattarasuda Sowsa-Nga
10 metre air rifle	Russia (RUS); Daria Vdovina; Polina Khorosheva; Anna Zhukova	Mongolia (MGL); Nandinzaya Gankhuyag; Yanjinlkham Olzvoibaatar; Narantuya Chuluunbadrakh	China (CHN); Li Peijing; Yu Dan; Wang Weiyang
25 metre pistol	Russia (RUS); Liubov Yaskevich; Anna Mastianina; Ekaterina Korshunova	Ukraine (UKR); Olena Kostevych; Kateryna Domkina; Marta Boichuk	China (CHN); Su Yuling; Zhang Jingjing; Zhou Qingyuan
50 metre rifle prone	Kazakhstan (KAZ); Olessya Shegirevich; Yuliya Morozova; Alexandra Malinovskaya	Thailand (THA); Thanyalak Chotphibunsin; Sununta Majchacheep; Vitchuda Pichitkanjanakul	Ukraine (UKR); Dariya Sharipova; Ievgeniia Borysova; Tetiana Tarasenko
50 metre rifle three positions	China (CHN); Li Peijing; Ma Hong; Yu Dan	Russia (RUS); Daria Vdovina; Polina Khorosheva; Valentina Protasova	Kazakhstan (KAZ); Olessya Shegirevich; Yuliya Morozova; Alexandra Malinovskaya
Skeet	Russia (RUS); Nadezhda Konovalova; Anastasia Krakhmaleva; Albina Shakirova	Thailand (THA); Nutchaya Sut-Arporn; Isarapa Imprasertsuk; Nutcha Sut-Arporn	Kazakhstan (KAZ); Elvira Akchurina; Angelina Michshuk; Zhaniya Aidarkhanova
Trap	Italy (ITA); Silvana Stanco; Erica Profumo; Federica Caporuscio	Russia (RUS); Alexandra Alexeeva; Tatiana Barsuk; Svetlana Krasheninnikova	China (CHN); Zhu Jingyu; Wang Shuying; Zhang Dandan
