= Tennis at the 2013 Summer Universiade – Men's singles =

Men's singles
- Tennis at the 2013 Summer Universiade

Final
- Champion: Lim Yong-kyu (KOR)
- Runner-up: Antso Rakotondramanga (MAD)
- Score: 6–4, 4–6, 6–2

Events
Singles	men	women
Doubles	men	women	mixed
Team	men	women
← 2011 ·	Summer Universiade	· 2015 →

The men's singles tennis event at the 2013 Summer Universiade was held from July 8 to 16 at the Tennis Academy in Kazan, Russia.

== Seeds ==
All seeds receive a bye into the second round.

1. Konstantin Kravchuk (RUS) (semifinals, bronze medallist)
2. Huang Liang-chi (TPE) (quarterfinals)
3. Lim Yong-kyu (KOR) (champion, gold medallist)
4. Victor Baluda (RUS) (fourth round)
5. Egor Gerasimov (BLR) (fourth round)
6. Sho Katayama (JPN) (fourth round)
7. Takuto Niki (JPN) (fourth round)
8. Kittiphong Wachiramanowong (THA) (quarterfinals)
9. Marat Deviatiarov (UKR) (third round)
10. Pavel Filin (BLR) (quarterfinals)
11. Wang Chieh-fu (TPE) (fourth round)
12. Antso Rakotondramanga (MAD) (final, silver medallist)
13. Petr Michnev (CZE) (fourth round)
14. Michal Pažický (SVK) (fourth round)
15. Daniel Geib (AUT) (third round)
16. Isade Juneau (CAN) (third round)

== Draw ==
=== Key ===
- Q = Qualifier
- WC = Wild card
- LL = Lucky loser
- Alt = Alternate
- ITF = ITF entry
- PR = Protected ranking
- SR = Special ranking
- SE = Special exempt
- JE = Junior exempt
- JR = Junior Accelerator Programme entrant
- CO = College Accelerator Programme entrant
- NG = Next Gen Accelerator Program entrant
- w/o = Walkover
- r = Retired
- d = Defaulted

=== Finals ===
Quarterfinals
1	Konstantin Kravchuk (RUS)	6	7^{7}
10	Pavel Filin (BLR)	2	6^{5}
3	Lim Yong-kyu (KOR)	6	6
8	Kittiphong Wachiramanowong (THA)	2	3
12	Antso Rakotondramanga (MAD)	6	7^{7}
Ray Sarmineto (USA)	3	6^{4}
Maxime Quinqueneau (FRA)	6	1	6
2	Huang Liang-chi (TPE)	2	6	4

Semifinals
1	Konstantin Kravchuk (RUS)	3	4
3	Lim Yong-kyu (KOR)	6	6
12	Antso Rakotondramanga (MAD)	7^{7}	6
Maxime Quinqueneau (FRA)	6^{5}	3

Final (gold-medal match)
3	Lim Yong-kyu (KOR)	6	4	6
12	Antso Rakotondramanga (MAD)	4	6	2

=== Top half ===
==== Section 1 ====
First round

Second round
1	K Kravchuk (RUS)	6	6
S Thompson (AUS)	4	2
F Mulenga (ZAM)	1	1
CT Lee-Daigle (CAN)	6	6
A Rakhmatov (TJK)
SF Lam (HKG)	w/o
M Munkhbayar (MGL)	1	0
14	M Pažický (SVK)	6	6

Third round
1	K Kravchuk (RUS)	6	6
CT Lee-Daigle (CAN)	4	2
SF Lam (HKG)	4	3
14	M Pažický (SVK)	6	6

Fourth round
1	K Kravchuk (RUS)	6	6
14	M Pažický (SVK)	1	2

==== Section 2 ====
First round
S Rocher (FRA)	7^{7}	7^{7}
A Ernepesov (TKM)	6^{2}	6^{1}

Second round
10	P Filin (BLR)	6	6
M Zougheib (LIB)	0	0
A Al-Mahruqi (OMA)	0	0
J Wiesinger (BRA)	6	6
SR Whitbread (GBR)	4	4
E Johnson (USA)	6	6
S Rocher (FRA)	4	6^{1}
6	S Katayama (JPN)	6	7^{7}

Third round
10	P Filin (BLR)	2	6	7
J Wiesinger (BRA)	6	4	5
E Johnson (USA)	4	2
6	S Katayama (JPN)	6	6

Fourth round
10	P Filin (BLR)	6	6
6	S Katayama (JPN)	4	4

==== Section 3 ====
First round

Second round
3	Y-k Lim (KOR)	6	6
SMA Syed (MAS)	3	2
K Thiyambarawatta (SRI)	w/o
TMS Mabaka (BOT)
PO Eichenberger (SUI)	6	6
Z Papez (SLO)	0	1
A Moreno Figueroa (MEX)	6^{4}	4
13	P Michnev (CZE)	7^{7}	6

Third round
3	Y-k Lim (KOR)	6	6
K Thiyambarawatta (SRI)	0	1
PO Eichenberger (SUI)	4	5
13	P Michnev (CZE)	6	7

Fourth round
3	Y-k Lim (KOR)	6	6
13	P Michnev (CZE)	1	3

==== Section 4 ====
First round
V Rakotondramanga (MAD)	6	6
T Chitemamwise (ZIM)	2	1

Second round
11	C-f Wang (TPE)	6	6
CH Herrera (COL)	0	0
J-M Erasmus (NAM)	6	7^{7}
H Feng (CHN)	1	6^{2}
JI Badano (ARG)	1	2
M Malyshev (UKR)	6	6
V Rakotondramanga (MAD)	0	1
8	K Wachiramanowong (THA)	6	6

Third round
11	C-f Wang (TPE)	6	6
J-M Erasmus (NAM)	2	3
M Malyshev (UKR)	4	2
8	K Wachiramanowong (THA)	6	6

Fourth round
11	C-f Wang (TPE)	5	6	4
8	K Wachiramanowong (THA)	7	2	6

=== Bottom half ===
==== Section 5 ====
First round

Second round
5	E Gerasimov (BLR)	6	6
KB Ocampo (PHI)	0	0
J Al-Marri (QAT)	0	0
A Meirelles (BRA)	6	6
P Siriluethaiwattana (THA)	w/o
M Yakahyaev (TJK)
AD Carlos (MEX)	1	1
12	A Rakotondramanga (MAD)	6	6

Third round
5	E Gerasimov (BLR)	6	6
A Meirelles (BRA)	0	3
P Siriluethaiwattana (THA)	3	3
12	A Rakotondramanga (MAD)	6	6

Fourth round
5	E Gerasimov (BLR)	5	2
12	A Rakotondramanga (MAD)	7	6

==== Section 6 ====
First round
S Chen (CHN)	6	6
J Zavcer (SLO)	0	1

Second round
16	I Juneau (CAN)	6	6
T Mufunda (ZIM)	0	2
A Taifour (JOR)	0	0
R Sarmiento (USA)	6	6
Y Goede (SUR)	6	6
A Al-Jahwari (OMA)	0	3
S Chen (CHN)	1	2
4	V Baluda (RUS)	6	6

Third round
16	I Juneau (CAN)	3	1
R Sarmiento (USA)	6	6
Y Goede (SUR)	1	0
4	V Baluda (RUS)	6	6

Fourth round
R Sarmiento (USA)	6	6
4	V Baluda (RUS)	3	2

==== Section 7 ====
First round

Second round
7	T Niki (JPN)	6	6
E Dovletov (TKM)	4	2
MA Correa (COL)	6	6
HR Wickramasinghe (SRI)	0	0
M Quinqueneau (FRA)	6	6
A Brighi (SMR)	0	0
J Karaki (LIB)	0	0
9	M Deviatiarov (UKR)	6	6

Third round
7	T Niki (JPN)	6	6
MA Correa (COL)	2	1
M Quinqueneau (FRA)	2	6	6
9	M Deviatiarov (UKR)	6	4	1

Fourth round
7	T Niki (JPN)	3	5
M Quinqueneau (FRA)	6	7

==== Section 8 ====
First round
S Komakech (UGA)	2	2
H Zulu (ZAM)	6	6

Second round
15	D Geib (AUT)	6	6
MF Said (MAS)	0	2
J Serdyn (NAM)	3	1
J-m Lee (KOR)	6	6
CM Simpson (GBR)	6	6
A Sandag (MGL)	0	0
H Zulu (ZAM)	0	0
2	L-c Huang (TPE)	6	6

Third round
15	D Geib (AUT)	6^{5}	6	3
J-m Lee (KOR)	7^{7}	4	6
CM Simpson (GBR)	3	6^{6}
2	L-c Huang (TPE)	6	7^{8}

Fourth round
J-m Lee (KOR)	4	3
2	L-c Huang (TPE)	6	6

== Consolation draw ==
=== Consolation finals ===
Semifinals
1	Shota Tagawa (JPN)	4	6	[10]
Alexis Desormaux Carlos (MEX)	6	1	[5]
3	Phillip Karis Anderson (CAN)	2	3
Johnny Wang (USA)	6	6

Final
1	Shota Tagawa (JPN)	6	6
Johnny Wang (USA)	2	4

=== Consolation main draw ===
==== Top half ====
First round
R Bellamy (USA)	2	2
MF Said (MAS)	6	6
F Mulenga (ZAM)	6	6
A Al-Mahruqi (OMA)	0	2
4	S Thompson (AUS)	w/o
Z Papez (SLO)
Y Zhang (CHN)	6	6
M Zougheib (LIB)	0	0
H Zulu (ZAM)	w/o
HR Wickramasinghe (SRI)

Second round
1	S Tagawa (JPN)	6	6
MF Said (MAS)	0	2
F Mulenga (ZAM)	0	0
A Li (CHN)	6	6
AD Carlos (MEX)	6	6
4	S Thompson (AUS)	3	4
Y Zhang (CHN)	6	6
H Zulu (ZAM)	4	0

Quarterfinals
1	S Tagawa (JPN)	6	6
A Li (CHN)	1	0
AD Carlos (MEX)	6	6
Y Zhang (CHN)	2	4

Semifinals
1	S Tagawa (JPN)	4	6	[10]
AD Carlos (MEX)	6	1	[5]

==== Bottom half ====
First round
A Taifour (JOR)	0	0
J Serdyn (NAM)	6	6
J Karaki (LIB)	1	3
H Feng (CHN)	6	6
CH Herrera (COL)	6	6
T Mufunda (ZIM)	2	2
A Al-Jahwari (OMA)	4	3
J Al-Marri (QAT)	6	6
A Muma (ZAM)	0	1
A Hoang (FRA)	6	6

Second round
J Serdyn (NAM)	6	6
H Feng (CHN)	3	3
CH Herrera (COL)	1	2
3	PK Anderson (CAN)	6	6
J Wang (USA)	6	6
J Al-Marri (QAT)	0	1
A Hoang (FRA)	5	6	[10]
2	M Shiga (JPN)	7	1	[7]

Quarterfinals
J Serdyn (NAM)	5	3
3	PK Anderson (CAN)	7	6
J Wang (USA)	6	6
A Hoang (FRA)	3	1

Semifinals
3	PK Anderson (CAN)	2	3
J Wang (USA)	6	6
