= Judo at the 2013 Summer Universiade =

Judo competition

Judo Judo at the 2013 Summer Universiade
- Venue: Tatneft Arena
- Location: Kazan, Russia
- Dates: 7–11 July 2013

Medalists
gold medal	South Korea (2nd title)
silver medal	Japan
bronze medal	Russia

Champions
- Men's team: Japan (5th title)
- Women's team: South Korea (1st title)

Competition at external databases
- Links: JudoInside

Judo was contested at the 2013 Summer Universiade at the TatNeft Arena in Kazan, Russia from 7 to 11 July 2013.

== Medal summary ==
=== Medal table ===
Rank	Nation	Gold	Silver	Bronze	Total
1	South Korea (KOR)	5	2	3	10
2	Japan (JPN)	4	2	5	11
3	Russia (RUS)*	2	2	6	10
4	Brazil (BRA)	2	1	3	6
5	Czech Republic (CZE)	2	0	2	4
6	France (FRA)	1	3	2	6
7	Cuba (CUB)	1	2	2	5
8	Hungary (HUN)	1	1	2	4
9	Ukraine (UKR)	0	1	3	4
10	Poland (POL)	0	1	1	2
10	Uzbekistan (UZB)	0	1	1	2
12	China (CHN)	0	1	0	1
12	Mongolia (MGL)	0	1	0	1
14	Austria (AUT)	0	0	1	1
14	Azerbaijan (AZE)	0	0	1	1
14	Belarus (BLR)	0	0	1	1
14	Chinese Taipei (TPE)	0	0	1	1
14	Germany (GER)	0	0	1	1
14	Portugal (POR)	0	0	1	1
Totals (19 entries)		18	18	36	72

=== Men's events ===
==== Individual ====
Event	Gold	Silver	Bronze
Bantamweight	Shinji Kido; Japan	Arsen Galstyan; Russia	Pavel Petříkov; Czech Republic
Bantamweight	Shinji Kido; Japan	Arsen Galstyan; Russia	Kim Won-jin; South Korea
Featherweight	Tomofumi Takajo; Japan	Cho Jun-hyun; South Korea	Yakub Shamilov; Russia
Featherweight	Tomofumi Takajo; Japan	Cho Jun-hyun; South Korea	Artem Kharchenko; Ukraine
Lightweight	Wang Ki-chun; South Korea	Jonathan Allardon; France	Yuki Nishiyama; Japan
Lightweight	Wang Ki-chun; South Korea	Jonathan Allardon; France	André Alves; Portugal
Welterweight	Takanori Nagase; Japan	Yakhyo Imamov; Uzbekistan	Mammadali Mehdiyev; Azerbaijan
Welterweight	Takanori Nagase; Japan	Yakhyo Imamov; Uzbekistan	László Csoknyai; Hungary
Middleweight	Gwak Dong-han; South Korea	Janchivdorj Bunddorj; Mongolia	Alexandr Jurečka; Czech Republic
Middleweight	Gwak Dong-han; South Korea	Janchivdorj Bunddorj; Mongolia	Kirill Voprosov; Russia
Light heavyweight	Lukáš Krpálek; Czech Republic	Zafar Makhmadov; Russia	Rafael Buzacarini; Brazil
Light heavyweight	Lukáš Krpálek; Czech Republic	Zafar Makhmadov; Russia	Soyib Kurbonov; Uzbekistan
Heavyweight	Cho Gu-ham; South Korea	Barna Bor; Hungary	Maciej Sarnacki; Poland
Heavyweight	Cho Gu-ham; South Korea	Barna Bor; Hungary	Renat Saidov; Russia
Open weight	Lukáš Krpálek; Czech Republic	Masaru Momose; Japan	David Moura; Brazil
Open weight	Lukáš Krpálek; Czech Republic	Masaru Momose; Japan	Kim Sung-min; South Korea
Team	Japan (JPN); Shinji Kido; Masaru Momose; Takanori Nagase; Yuki Nishiyama; Ryuko Ogawa; Takeshi Ojitani; Shohei Shimowada; Tomofumi Takajo	South Korea (KOR); Cho Gu-ham; Cho Jun-hyun; Gwak Dong-han; Kim Sung-min; Kim Won-jin; Lee Seung-su; Shim Ji-ho; Wang Ki-chun	Hungary (HUN); Barna Bor; Miklós Cirjenics; László Csoknyai; Tibor Majer; Attila István Ungvári; Gábor Vér; Bence Zámbori
Team	Japan (JPN); Shinji Kido; Masaru Momose; Takanori Nagase; Yuki Nishiyama; Ryuko Ogawa; Takeshi Ojitani; Shohei Shimowada; Tomofumi Takajo	South Korea (KOR); Cho Gu-ham; Cho Jun-hyun; Gwak Dong-han; Kim Sung-min; Kim Won-jin; Lee Seung-su; Shim Ji-ho; Wang Ki-chun	Brazil (BRA); Rafael Buzacarini; João Macedo; Vinicius Panini; Phelipe Pelim; Luiz Revite; David Moura; Eduardo Silva

=== Women's events ===
==== Individual ====
Event	Gold	Silver	Bronze
Bantamweight	Alesia Kuznetcova; Russia	Scarlett Gabrielli; France	Dayaris Mestre Álvarez; Cuba
Bantamweight	Alesia Kuznetcova; Russia	Scarlett Gabrielli; France	Maryna Cherniak; Ukraine
Featherweight	Natalia Kuziutina; Russia	Yanet Bermoy; Cuba	Romy Tarangul; Germany
Featherweight	Natalia Kuziutina; Russia	Yanet Bermoy; Cuba	Ai Shishime; Japan
Lightweight	Ketleyn Quadros; Brazil	Shushana Hevondian; Ukraine	Shoko Ono; Japan
Lightweight	Ketleyn Quadros; Brazil	Shushana Hevondian; Ukraine	Lien Chen-Ling; Chinese Taipei
Welterweight	Maëlle Di Cintio; France	Kayoko Sano; Japan	Kathrin Unterwurzacher; Austria
Welterweight	Maëlle Di Cintio; France	Kayoko Sano; Japan	Marta Labazina; Russia
Middleweight	Hwang Ye-sul; South Korea	Zhao Jia; China	Onix Cortés; Cuba
Middleweight	Hwang Ye-sul; South Korea	Zhao Jia; China	Fanny Estelle Posvite; France
Light heavyweight	Abigél Joó; Hungary	Madeleine Malonga; France	Mami Umeki; Japan
Light heavyweight	Abigél Joó; Hungary	Madeleine Malonga; France	Park Jong-won; South Korea
Heavyweight	Rochele Nunes; Brazil	Idalys Ortiz; Cuba	Maryna Slutskaya; Belarus
Heavyweight	Rochele Nunes; Brazil	Idalys Ortiz; Cuba	Mariya Shekerova; Russia
Open weight	Idalys Ortiz; Cuba	Rochele Nunes; Brazil	Manami Inoue; Japan
Open weight	Idalys Ortiz; Cuba	Rochele Nunes; Brazil	Yelyzaveta Kalanina; Ukraine
Team	South Korea (KOR); Choi Soo-hee; Hwang Ye-sul; Joung Da-woon; Kim Eun-kyeong; Kim Min-ju; Kim Mi-ri; Lee Jung-eun; Park Jong-won	Poland (POL); Katarzyna Furmanek; Joanna Jaworska; Ewa Konieczny; Halima Mohamed-Seghir; Zuzanna Pawlikowska; Agata Perenc; Karolina Tałach	France (FRA); Pénélope Bonna; Maëlle Di Cintio; Scarlett Gabrielli; Madeleine Malonga; Anne-Fatoumata Mbairo; Fanny Estelle Posvite; Helene Receveaux
Team	South Korea (KOR); Choi Soo-hee; Hwang Ye-sul; Joung Da-woon; Kim Eun-kyeong; Kim Min-ju; Kim Mi-ri; Lee Jung-eun; Park Jong-won	Poland (POL); Katarzyna Furmanek; Joanna Jaworska; Ewa Konieczny; Halima Mohamed-Seghir; Zuzanna Pawlikowska; Agata Perenc; Karolina Tałach	Russia (RUS); Aleksandra Babintseva; Anastasiya Dmitrieva; Margarita Gurtsieva; Natalia Kuziutina; Alesia Kuznetcova; Marta Labazina; Mariya Shekerova; Irina Zabludina
