= Table tennis at the 2013 Summer Universiade – Men's team =

Men's Team Table tennis at the XXVII Summer Universiade
- Venue: Sport Palace
- Dates: July 9, 2013 – July 12, 2013

Medalists
1st place, gold medalist(s)		China
2nd place, silver medalist(s)		Japan
3rd place, bronze medalist(s)		Russia, Chinese Taipei

The men's team portion of Table tennis at the 2013 Summer Universiade was held between July 7–12.

== Results ==
Qualification
China	3
Australia	0
Hong Kong	0
Germany	3
Bulgaria
Spain	WO
Estonia	0
Chinese Taipei	3
France	3
Vietnam	0
Latvia	0
Russia	3
Belgium	3
Chile	0
South Korea	0
Japan	3

Quarterfinals
China	3
Germany	1
Spain	0
Chinese Taipei	3
France	0
Russia	3
Belgium	1
Japan	3

Semifinals
China	3
Chinese Taipei	1
Russia	1
Japan	3

Finals
China	3
Japan	0
