= Tennis at the 2013 Summer Universiade – Men's doubles =

Men's doubles
- Tennis at the 2013 Summer Universiade

Final
- Champions: Lee Hsin-han (TPE); Peng Hsien-yin (TPE)
- Runners-up: Victor Baluda (RUS); Konstantin Kravchuk (RUS)
- Score: 6–3, 6–4

Events
Singles	men	women
Doubles	men	women	mixed
Team	men	women
← 2011 ·	Summer Universiade	· 2015 →

The men's doubles tennis event at the 2013 Summer Universiade was held from July 8 to 16 at the Tennis Academy in Kazan, Russia.

== Seeds ==
The first six seeds receive a bye into the second round.

1. Lee Hsin-han (TPE) / Peng Hsien-yin (TPE) (champions, gold medallists)
2. Victor Baluda (RUS) / Konstantin Kravchuk (RUS) (final, silver medallists)
3. Aliaksandr Bury (BLR) / Andrei Vasilevski (BLR) (semifinals, bronze medallists)
4. Lim Yong-kyu (KOR) / Noh Sang-woo (KOR) (semifinals, bronze medallists)
5. Sho Katayama (JPN) / Shota Tagawa (JPN) (quarterfinals)
6. Perakiat Siriluethaiwattana (THA) / Kittiphong Wachiramanowong (THA) (quarterfinals)
7. Augusto Meirelles (BRA) / Joao Wiesinger (BRA) (first round)
8. Phillip Karis Anderson (CAN) / Christiaan Ting Lee-Daigle (CAN) (second round)

== Draw ==
=== Key ===
- Q = Qualifier
- WC = Wild card
- LL = Lucky loser
- Alt = Alternate
- ITF = ITF entry
- PR = Protected ranking
- SR = Special ranking
- SE = Special exempt
- JE = Junior exempt
- JR = Junior Accelerator Programme entrant
- CO = College Accelerator Programme entrant
- NG = Next Gen Accelerator Program entrant
- w/o = Walkover
- r = Retired
- d = Defaulted

=== Finals ===
Semifinals
1	Lee Hsin-han (TPE); Peng Hsien-yin (TPE)	6	6
4	Lim Yong-kyu (KOR); Noh Sang-woo (KOR)	2	3
3	Aliaksandr Bury (BLR); Andrei Vasilevski (BLR)	4	3
2	Victor Baluda (RUS); Konstantin Kravchuk (RUS)	6	6

Final
1	Lee Hsin-han (TPE); Peng Hsien-yin (TPE)	6	6
2	Victor Baluda (RUS); Konstantin Kravchuk (RUS)	3	4

=== Top half ===
First round
A Li (CHN); Y Zhang (CHN)	6	6
MA Correa (COL); CH Herrera (COL)	3	1
J Karaki (LIB); M Zougheib (LIB)	6	6
A Al-Mahruqi (OMA); Al-Jahwari (OMA)	0	0
R Bellamy (USA); R Sarmiento (USA)	6	6
T Chitemamwise (ZIM); T Mufunda (ZIM)	0	0
A Muma (ZAM); H Zulu (ZIM)	0	1
M Deviatiarov (UKR); M Malyshev (UKR)	6	6
D Cochrane (GBR); SR Whitbread (GBR)	6	6
V Rakotondramanga (MAD); A Rakotondramanga (MAD)	2	4

Second round
1	H-h Lee (TPE); H-y Peng (TPE)	6	6
A Li (CHN); Y Zhang (CHN)	3	1
J Karaki (LIB); M Zougheib (LIB)	1	1
R Bellamy (USA); R Sarmiento (USA)	6	6
4	Y-k Lim (KOR); S-w Noh (KOR)	6	6
M Deviatiarov (UKR); M Malyshev (UKR)	4	2
D Cochrane (GBR); SR Whitbread (GBR)	6^{5}	6^{2}
6	P Siriluethaiwattana (THA); K Wachiramanowong (THA)	7^{7}	7^{7}

Quarterfinals
1	H-h Lee (TPE); H-y Peng (TPE)	6	6
R Bellamy (USA); R Sarmiento (USA)	2	2
4	Y-k Lim (KOR); S-w Noh (KOR)	7^{7}	3	[10]
6	P Siriluethaiwattana (THA); K Wachiramanowong (THA)	6^{5}	6	[7]

Semifinals
1	H-h Lee (TPE); H-y Peng (TPE)	6	6
4	Y-k Lim (KOR); S-w Noh (KOR)	2	3

=== Bottom half ===
First round
H Agampodi (SRI); HR Wickramasinghe (SRI)	0	0
A Moreno Figueroa (MEX); B Rodriguez (MEX)	6	6
8	PK Anderson (CAN); CT Lee-Daigle (CAN)	6	6
Z Papez (SLO); J Zavcer (SLO)	1	0
J-M Erasmus (NAM); J Serdyn (NAM)	6	3	[10]
E Dovletov (TKM); A Ernepesov (TKM)	4	6	[3]
MF Said (MAS); SMA Syed (MAS)	6	7^{7}
7	A Meirelles (BRA); J Wiesinger (BRA)	4	6^{4}
M Munkhbayar (MGL); A Sandag (MGL)	1	0
A Hoang (FRA); M Quinqueneau (FRA)	6	6

Second round
5	S Katayama (JPN); S Tagawa (JPN)	4	6	[10]
A Moreno Figueroa (MEX); B Rodriguez (MEX)	6	2	[5]
8	PK Anderson (CAN); CT Lee-Daigle (CAN)	3	4
3	A Bury (BLR); A Vasilevski (BLR)	6	6
J-M Erasmus (NAM); J Serdyn (NAM)	7^{7}	6^{3}	[10]
MF Said (MAS); SMA Syed (MAS)	6^{5}	7^{7}	[4]
A Hoang (FRA); M Quinqueneau (FRA)	5	5
2	V Baluda (RUS); K Kravchuk (RUS)	7	7

Quarterfinals
5	S Katayama (JPN); S Tagawa (JPN)	6^{3}	6^{2}
3	A Bury (BLR); A Vasilevski (BLR)	7^{7}	7^{7}
J-M Erasmus (NAM); J Serdyn (NAM)	0	1
2	V Baluda (RUS); K Kravchuk (RUS)	6	6

Semifinals
3	A Bury (BLR); A Vasilevski (BLR)	4	3
2	V Baluda (RUS); K Kravchuk (RUS)	6	6
