= Weightlifting at the 2013 Summer Universiade =

Weightlifting at the XXVII Summer Universiade
- Venues: Ak Bure Multipurpose Sports Complex; Batyr Sports Complex
- Dates: July 7, 2013 – July 12, 2013

Weightlifting was contested at the 2013 Summer Universiade from July 7 to 12 at the Ak Bure Multipurpose Sports Complex and the Batyr Sports Complex in Kazan, Russia.

== Medal summary ==
On August 8, 2016, the International Weightlifting Federation announced the disqualification of several athletes who participated in the competition due to the retesting of the anti-doping exams, with which several medals are redistributed.

On 9 September 2023, the Court of Arbitration for Sport annulled the results from Tatiana Kashirina who won the gold medal on women's +75kg event over four years of her results due to drugs offenses, stating, "All the competitive results obtained by Tatiana Kashirina from 1 April 2013 until 19 June 2017 were disqualified, with all the resulting consequences, including the forfeiture of any titles, awards, medals, points and prize and appearance money".

=== Medal table ===
* Host nation (Russia)

Rank	Nation	Gold	Silver	Bronze	Total
1	Russia (RUS)*	5	2	3	10
2	North Korea (PRK)	2	2	1	5
3	Iran (IRI)	2	1	0	3
4	China (CHN)	2	0	1	3
5	Thailand (THA)	1	1	2	4
6	Uzbekistan (UZB)	1	1	1	3
7	Chinese Taipei (TPE)	1	1	0	2
7	Japan (JPN)	1	1	0	2
9	South Korea (KOR)	0	1	1	2
10	France (FRA)	0	1	0	1
10	Indonesia (INA)	0	1	0	1
10	Kazakhstan (KAZ)	0	1	0	1
10	Romania (ROM)	0	1	0	1
10	United States (USA)	0	1	0	1
15	Armenia (ARM)	0	0	1	1
15	Canada (CAN)	0	0	1	1
15	Egypt (EGY)	0	0	1	1
15	Lithuania (LTU)	0	0	1	1
15	Moldova (MDA)	0	0	1	1
15	Turkey (TUR)	0	0	1	1
Totals (20 entries)		15	15	15	45

=== Men's events ===
Event	Gold		Silver		Bronze	
56 kg	Xu Jingui; China	264	Surahmat Bin Suwito Wijoyo; Indonesia	250	Oleg Sîrghi; Moldova	246
62 kg	Cha Kum-Chol; North Korea	306	Yoichi Itokazu; Japan	294	Ahmed Saad; Egypt	282
69 kg	Jaber Behrouzi; Iran	322	Bernardin Matam; France	315	Kwon Chang-Il; North Korea	310
77 kg	Rasoul Taghian; Iran	355	Ulugbek Alimov; Uzbekistan	351	Dmitriy Khomyakov; Russia	351
85 kg	Artem Okulov; Russia	371	Gabriel Sîncrăian; Romania	360	Aghasi Agashayan; Armenia	360
94 kg	Aleksandr Ivanov; Russia	395	Kendrick Farris; United States	372	Žygimantas Stanulis; Lithuania	372
105 kg	Ruslan Nurudinov; Uzbekistan	412	Andrey Demanov; Russia	406	David Bedzhanyan; Russia	403
+105 kg	Ruslan Albegov; Russia	459	Bahador Molaei; Iran	450	Magomed Abuev; Russia	427

=== Women's events ===
Event	Gold		Silver		Bronze	
48 kg	Xiao Hongyu; China	187	Paek Il-Hwa; North Korea	180	Panida Khamsri; Thailand	174
53 kg	Kanae Yagi; Japan	195	Kittima Sutanan; Thailand	194	Ayşegül Çoban; Turkey	189
58 kg	Kuo Hsing-chun; Chinese Taipei	238	Choe Hyo-Sim; North Korea	225	Pimsiri Sirikaew; Thailand	216
63 kg	Pyon Yong-Mi; North Korea	233	Karina Goricheva; Kazakhstan	227	Kim Soo-Kyung; South Korea	226
69 kg	Oksana Slivenko; Russia	242	Hung Wan-ting; Chinese Taipei	224	Manzurahon Mamasaliyeva; Uzbekistan	222
75 kg	Olga Zubova; Russia	279	Nadezhda Evstyukhina; Russia	278	Marie-Ève Beauchemin-Nadeau; Canada	233
+75 kg	Chitchanok Pulsabsakul; Thailand	278	Lee Hui-Sol; South Korea	268	Jia Weipeng; China	267
