= Table tennis at the 2013 Summer Universiade =

Table tennis at the XXVII Summer Universiade
- Venue: Sport Palace
- Dates: July 7, 2013 – July 15, 2013

Table tennis was contested at the 2013 Summer Universiade from July 7 to 15 at the Sport Palace in Kazan, Russia. Men's and women's singles, men's and women's team, and men's, women's, and mixed doubles events was contested.

== Medal summary ==
=== Medal table ===
Rank	Nation	Gold	Silver	Bronze	Total
1	China (CHN)	3	3	3	9
2	Japan (JPN)	2	2	3	7
3	Chinese Taipei (TPE)	2	1	2	5
4	Russia (RUS)*	0	1	5	6
5	France (FRA)	0	0	1	1
Totals (5 entries)		7	7	14	28

=== Medal events ===
Event	Gold	Silver	Bronze
Men's singles	Liu Yi; China	Shang Kun; China	Chen Chien-an; Chinese Taipei
Men's singles	Liu Yi; China	Shang Kun; China	Koki Niwa; Japan
Women's singles	Che Xiaoxi; China	Zheng Shichang; China	Ma Yuefei; China
Women's singles	Che Xiaoxi; China	Zheng Shichang; China	Yuka Ishigaki; Japan
Men's doubles	Chinese Taipei (TPE); Chiang Hung-chieh; Huang Sheng-sheng	Russia (RUS); Viacheslav Burov; Mikhail Paykov	France (FRA); Thomas Le Breton; Romain Lorentz
Men's doubles	Chinese Taipei (TPE); Chiang Hung-chieh; Huang Sheng-sheng	Russia (RUS); Viacheslav Burov; Mikhail Paykov	Russia (RUS); Alexander Shibaev; Kirill Skachkov
Women's doubles	Chinese Taipei (TPE); Lee I-chen; Lin Chia-hui	China (CHN); Che Xiaoxi; Jiang Yue	Japan (JPN); Yuka Shigaki; Riyo Nemoto
Women's doubles	Chinese Taipei (TPE); Lee I-chen; Lin Chia-hui	China (CHN); Che Xiaoxi; Jiang Yue	Russia (RUS); Yana Noskova; Elena Troshneva
Mixed doubles	Japan (JPN); Hiromitsu Kasahara; Rika Suzuki	Japan (JPN); Koki Niwa; Misato Niwa	Russia (RUS); Antonina Savelyeva; Alexander Shibaev
Mixed doubles	Japan (JPN); Hiromitsu Kasahara; Rika Suzuki	Japan (JPN); Koki Niwa; Misato Niwa	China (CHN); Ma Yuefei; Xia Yizheng
Men's team	China (CHN); Fang Bo; Hu Bingtao; Liu Yi; Shang Kun; Xia Yizheng	Japan (JPN); Yuki Hirano; Hiromitsu Kasahara; Koki Niwa; Jin Ueda; Maharu Yoshimura	Russia (RUS); Viacheslav Burov; Viacheslav Krivosheev; Mikhail Paykov; Alexander Shibaev; Kirill Skachkov
Men's team	China (CHN); Fang Bo; Hu Bingtao; Liu Yi; Shang Kun; Xia Yizheng	Japan (JPN); Yuki Hirano; Hiromitsu Kasahara; Koki Niwa; Jin Ueda; Maharu Yoshimura	Chinese Taipei (TPE); Chen Chien-an; Chiang Hung-chieh; Huang Sheng-sheng; Hung Tzu-hsiang; Wu Chih-chi
Women's team	Japan (JPN); Yoko Hirano; Yuka Ishigaki; Riyo Nemoto; Misato Niwa; Rika Suzuki	Chinese Taipei (TPE); Chen Szu-yu; Cheng I-ching; Hsiung Nai-i; Lee I-chen; Lin Chia-hui	China (CHN); Che Xiaoxi; Jiang Yue; Ma Yuefei; Xiong Xinyun; Zheng Shichang
Women's team	Japan (JPN); Yoko Hirano; Yuka Ishigaki; Riyo Nemoto; Misato Niwa; Rika Suzuki	Chinese Taipei (TPE); Chen Szu-yu; Cheng I-ching; Hsiung Nai-i; Lee I-chen; Lin Chia-hui	Russia (RUS); Polina Mikhailova; Yana Noskova; Valentina Sabitova; Antonina Savelyeva; Elena Troshneva
