= Rowing at the 2013 Summer Universiade – Men's lightweight coxless four =

The men's lightweight coxless four competition at the 2013 Summer Universiade in Kazan took place the Kazan Rowing Centre.

== Results ==
=== Heats ===
==== Heat 1 ====
| Rank | Rower | Country | Time | Notes |
|---|---|---|---|---|
| 1 | Morgan Maunoir; Barthelemy Agostini; Clement Fonta; Edouard Jonville | France | 6:18.47 | Q |
| 2 | Masato Kobayashi; Hirohide Sakagami; Yusuke Sato; Yusaku Araki | Japan | 6:19.99 | Q |
| 3 | James Brittain; Gareth Maybery; Devon Lee Miller; Scott Donaldson | South Africa | 6:22.48 | R |
| 4 | Peter Krpesics; Peter Bartfai; Bence Vallyon; Edvin Novak | Hungary | 6:29.96 | R |
| 5 | Yauheni Shymul; Aliaksandr Piatrushchyk; Dzmitry Hetsevich; Yauheni Kryvashei | Belarus | 6:48.10 | R |

==== Heat 2 ====
| Rank | Rower | Country | Time | Notes |
|---|---|---|---|---|
| 1 | Tobias Franzmann; Stefan Wallat; Daniel Wisgott; Lasse Antczak | Germany | 6:17.29 | Q |
| 2 | Rafal Serwiak; Dawid Kaminski; Kamil Bredow; Radoslaw Krymski | Poland | 6:21.02 | Q |
| 3 | Lorenzo Tedesco; Andrea Fois; Marcello Nicoletti; Corrado Regalbuto | Italy | 6:22.33 | R |
| 4 | Vladimir Voronov; Aleksei Vikulin; Anton Kuranov; Andrey Kryazhev | Russia | 6:35.03 | R |
| 5 | Muhammad Haq; Tanveer Arif; Sajid Ghafoor; Hafiz Umar | Pakistan | 7:44.80 | R |

=== Repechage ===
| Rank | Rower | Country | Time | Notes |
|---|---|---|---|---|
| 1 | Lorenzo Tedesco; Andrea Fois; Marcello Nicoletti; Corrado Regalbuto | Italy | 7:04.46 | Q |
| 2 | Vladimir Voronov; Aleksei Vikulin; Anton Kuranov; Andrey Kryazhev | Russia | 7:06.28 | Q |
| 3 | James Brittain; Gareth Maybery; Devon Lee Miller; Scott Donaldson | South Africa | 7:07.87 | FB |
| 4 | Peter Krpesics; Peter Bartfai; Bence Vallyon; Edvin Novak | Hungary | 7:17.53 | FB |
| 5 | Yauheni Shymul; Aliaksandr Piatrushchyk; Dzmitry Hetsevich; Yauheni Kryvashei | Belarus | 7:38.60 | FB |
| 6 | Muhammad Haq; Tanveer Arif; Sajid Ghafoor; Hafiz Umar | Pakistan | 9:20.82 | FB |
