= Badminton at the 2013 Summer Universiade =

Badminton at the XXVII Summer Universiade
- Venue: Tennis Academy
- Dates: July 5, 2013 – July 11, 2013

Badminton was contested at the 2013 Summer Universiade from July 5 to 11 at the Tennis Academy in Kazan, Russia. Men's and women's singles, men's, women's, and mixed doubles, and mixed team events were contested.

== Medal summary ==
=== Medal table ===
* Host nation (Russia)

Rank	Nation	Gold	Silver	Bronze	Total
1	South Korea (KOR)	5	0	2	7
2	Thailand (THA)	1	0	2	3
3	China (CHN)	0	4	1	5
4	Chinese Taipei (TPE)	0	1	3	4
5	Russia (RUS)*	0	1	1	2
6	Malaysia (MAS)	0	0	3	3
Totals (6 entries)		6	6	12	24

=== Medal events ===
Event	Gold	Silver	Bronze
Men's singles	Tanongsak Saensomboonsuk; Thailand	Gao Huan; China	Iskandar Z. Zainuddin; Malaysia
Men's singles	Tanongsak Saensomboonsuk; Thailand	Gao Huan; China	Chou Tien-chen; Chinese Taipei
Women's singles	Sung Ji-hyun; South Korea	Tai Tzu-ying; Chinese Taipei	Yao Xue; China
Women's singles	Sung Ji-hyun; South Korea	Tai Tzu-ying; Chinese Taipei	Porntip Buranaprasertsuk; Thailand
Men's doubles	South Korea (KOR); Ko Sung-hyun; Lee Yong-dae	Russia (RUS); Vladimir Ivanov; Ivan Sozonov	South Korea (KOR); Hong Ji-hoon; Kim Ki-jung
Men's doubles	South Korea (KOR); Ko Sung-hyun; Lee Yong-dae	Russia (RUS); Vladimir Ivanov; Ivan Sozonov	Malaysia (MAS); Loh Wei Sheng; Jagdish Singh
Women's doubles	South Korea (KOR); Jang Ye-na; Kim So-young	China (CHN); Luo Yu; Tian Qing	South Korea (KOR); Lee So-hee; Shin Seung-chan
Women's doubles	South Korea (KOR); Jang Ye-na; Kim So-young	China (CHN); Luo Yu; Tian Qing	Malaysia (MAS); Chow Mei Kuan; Lee Meng Yean
Mixed doubles	South Korea (KOR); Kim Ki-jung; Kim So-young	China (CHN); Liu Cheng; Tian Qing	Russia (RUS); Vladimir Ivanov; Nina Vislova
Mixed doubles	South Korea (KOR); Kim Ki-jung; Kim So-young	China (CHN); Liu Cheng; Tian Qing	Chinese Taipei (TPE); Chen Hung-ling; Wang Pei-rong
Mixed team	South Korea (KOR); Jang Ye-na; Hong Ji-hoon; Kim Ki-jung; Kim Min-gi; Kim So-young; Ko Sung-hyun; Lee So-hee; Lee Yong-dae; Shin Seung-chan; Sung Ji-hyun	China (CHN); Chen Luoxun; Chen Xi; Gao Huan; Li Gen; Liu Cheng; Luo Yu; Sun Yu; Suo Di; Tian Houwei; Tian Qing; Yao Xue; Zhang Zhijun	Thailand (THA); Savitree Amitrapai; Akarawin Apisuk; Inkarat Apisuk; Pacharakamol Arkornsakul; Porntip Buranaprasertsuk; Chanida Julrattanamanee; Suwat Phaisansomsuk; Pisit Poodchalat; Rawinda Prajongjai; Tanongsak Saensomboonsuk; Pijtjan Wangpaiboonkij; Sermsin Wongyaprom
Mixed team	South Korea (KOR); Jang Ye-na; Hong Ji-hoon; Kim Ki-jung; Kim Min-gi; Kim So-young; Ko Sung-hyun; Lee So-hee; Lee Yong-dae; Shin Seung-chan; Sung Ji-hyun	China (CHN); Chen Luoxun; Chen Xi; Gao Huan; Li Gen; Liu Cheng; Luo Yu; Sun Yu; Suo Di; Tian Houwei; Tian Qing; Yao Xue; Zhang Zhijun	Chinese Taipei (TPE); Chen Hung-ling; Chiang Kai-hsin; Chou Tien-chen; Kuo Yu-wen; Lin Yen-jui; Lu Chia-bin; Pai Hsiao-ma; Tai Tzu-ying; Tsai Pei-lin; Wang Chih-hao; Wang Pei-rong; Yang Chih-hsun
