= Volleyball at the 2013 Summer Universiade =

Volleyball at the XXVII Summer Universiade
- Venue: various
- Dates: July 6, 2013 – July 16, 2013
- Teams: 22 (men); 15 (women)

Volleyball was contested at the 2013 Summer Universiade from July 8 to 13 in Kazan, Russia.

== Medal summary ==
=== Medal table ===
Rank	Nation	Gold	Silver	Bronze	Total
1	Russia (RUS)*	2	0	0	2
2	Brazil (BRA)	0	1	0	1
2	Poland (POL)	0	1	0	1
4	Japan (JPN)	0	0	1	1
4	Thailand (THA)	0	0	1	1
Totals (5 entries)		2	2	2	6

=== Medal events ===
Event	Gold	Silver	Bronze
Men	Russia (RUS); Sergey Antipkin; Denis Biryukov; Valentin Golubev; Dmitriy Ilinikh; Dmitriy Kovalev; Aleksandr Markin; Sergey Savin; Dmitriy Shcherbinin; Denis Shipotko; Oleg Sychev; Artem Volvich; Maksim Zhigalov	Poland (POL); Grzegorz Bociek; Wojciech Ferens; Piotr Hain; Miłosz Hebda; Karol Kłos; Grzegorz Łomacz; Kacper Popik; Krzysztof Wierzbowski; Wojciech Włodarczyk; Damian Wojtaszek; Maciej Zajder; Wojciech Żaliński	Japan (JPN); Shunsuke Chijiki; Takashi Dekita; Hideomi Fukatsu; Yamato Fushimi; Hidetomo Hoshino; Taichiro Koga; Issei Maeda; Shoh Ozawa; Haku Ri; Tatsuya Shiota; Sogo Watanabe; Shuzo Yamada
Women	Russia (RUS); Kseniia Bondar; Maria Borodakova; Victoriia Chaplina; Natalia Dianskaya; Anna Malova; Natalia Malykh; Nataliya Obmochaeva; Ekaterina Pankova; Aleksandra Pasynkova; Anastasia Salina; Anastasia Shlyakhovaya; Irina Zaryazhko	Brazil (BRA); Regiane Bidias; Juliana Carrijo; Sonaly Cidrão; Natasha Farinea; Amanda Francisco; Danielle Moreira; Roberta Ratzke; Carla Santos; Tássia Silva; Ana Carolina Silva; Bruna Honório; Mayhara Silva	Thailand (THA); Jarasporn Bundasak; Tapaphaipun Chaisri; Pornpun Guedpard; Amporn Hyapha; Kaewkalaya Kamulthala; Malika Kanthong; Sontaya Keawbundit; Thatdao Nuekjang; Piyanut Pannoy; Em-orn Phanusit; Onuma Sittirak; Nootsara Tomkom

== Men ==
Twenty-two teams participated in the men's tournament.

=== Teams ===
Pool A

- Russia
- South Korea
- United States
- Hong Kong
- Estonia
- Belarus

Pool B

- Ukraine
- Thailand
- Japan
- ~~Oman~~ (withdrew)
- ~~Algeria~~ (withdrew)
- Latvia

Pool C

- Brazil
- Switzerland
- Australia
- China
- Poland
- Macau

Pool D

- Canada
- Czech Republic
- Mexico
- United Arab Emirates
- Chile

== Women ==
Sixteen teams participated in the women's tournament.

=== Teams ===
Pool A

- Russia
- Poland
- United States
- Czech Republic

Pool B

- Brazil
- Canada
- Norway
- ~~Algeria~~ (withdrew)

Pool C

- China
- Chinese Taipei
- Slovakia
- North Korea

Pool D

- Japan
- Thailand
- Hong Kong
- Chile
