= Field hockey at the 2013 Summer Universiade =

Field hockey at the XXVII Summer Universiade
- Venue: various
- Dates: July 7, 2013 – July 15, 2013
- Teams: 10 (men); 4 (women)

Field hockey was contested at the 2013 Summer Universiade from July 7 through July 15 in Kazan, Russia.

== Medal summary ==
=== Medal table ===
Rank	Nation	Gold	Silver	Bronze	Total
1	Russia (RUS)*	1	1	0	2
2	South Korea (KOR)	1	0	0	1
3	France (FRA)	0	1	0	1
4	Germany (GER)	0	0	1	1
4	Japan (JPN)	0	0	1	1
Totals (5 entries)		2	2	2	6

=== Medal events ===
Event	Gold	Silver	Bronze
Men	Russia (RUS); Artem Borisov; Alexander Cherenkov; Marat Gafarov; Pavel Golubev; Marat Khairullin; Nikolay Komarov; Anton Kornilov; Almaz Kurbanov; Yaroslav Loginov; Aleksei Maiorov; Dinar Mukhametshin; Konstantin Nikitin; Pavel Plesetckii; Denis Shchipachev; Igor Sinyagin; Aleksandr Siuskin; Nikolay Yankun; Ilfat Zamalutdinov	France (FRA); Gaspard Baumgarten; Victor Charlet; Guillaume Deront; Matthias Dierckens; Bastien Dierckens; Jean-Baptiste Forgues; Hugo Genestet; Martin Genestet; Joost Jansen; Jean-Laurent Kieffer; Maxence Lecointe; Viktor Lockwood; Simon Martin-Brisac; Edgar Reynaud; Guillaume Samson; Olivier Sanchez; François Scheefer; Lucas Sevestre	Germany (GER); Jakob Ahlers; Sven Alex; Anton Ebeling; Jonas Fürste; Marcus Funken; Philipp Grosser; Timm Haase; Ole Keusgen; Matthias Knüpfer; Lennard Leist; Kevin Lim; Felix Kurt Meyer; Jannik Otto; Jan Sakowsky; Friedrich Schmitz; Florian Schrader; Georg von Oertzen; Maximilian Wüterich
Women	South Korea (KOR); Bae So-ra; Baek Ee-seul; Cho Eun-ji; Cho Yunk-young; Choi Jin-seon; Han Hye-lyoung; Hong Ji-seon; Jang Soo-ji; Kim Jae-jin; Kim Jong-eun; Lee Sae-rom; Lee Yu-ri; Park Ji-hye; Park Seung-a; Park Yeon-hee; Park Ki-ju; Seo Da-hye; Shin Hye-jeong	Russia (RUS); Elena Belova; Nadezhda Chekhova; Olga Chugunova; Elizaveta Goncharevskaya; Natalia Kondratieva; Irina Kuzmina; Kristina Mozgovaya; Oxana Ochkalova; Olesya Petrova; Svetlana Prokhorova; Anna Rubtsova; Svetlana Salamatina; Ekaterina Shaburova; Kristina Shumilina; Evgenia Sorokina; Ksenia Svezhentseva; Elena Vavilova; Alexandra Zhashkova	Japan (JPN); Misa Fujii; Saki Hayato; Haruka Higuma; Naho Ichitani; Megumi Kageyama; Risako Kanameishi; Yukari Mano; Aki Mitsuhashi; Yuri Nagai; Ayaka Nishimura; Ayaka Okada; Nanae Ozawa; Shiho Sakai; Minami Shimizu; Izuki Tanaka; Chiharu Urashima; Rui Yamashita; Eriko Yoshiura

== Men ==
Ten teams participated in the men's tournament.

=== Teams ===
Group A

- Russia
- South Africa
- Malaysia
- Poland
- Italy

Group B

- Germany
- South Korea
- Japan
- France
- Ukraine

== Women ==
Four teams participated in the women's tournament.

=== Teams ===
- Russia
- South Korea
- Japan
- Belarus
