= Victoria Chaplina =

Russian volleyball player

Victoria Rusakova
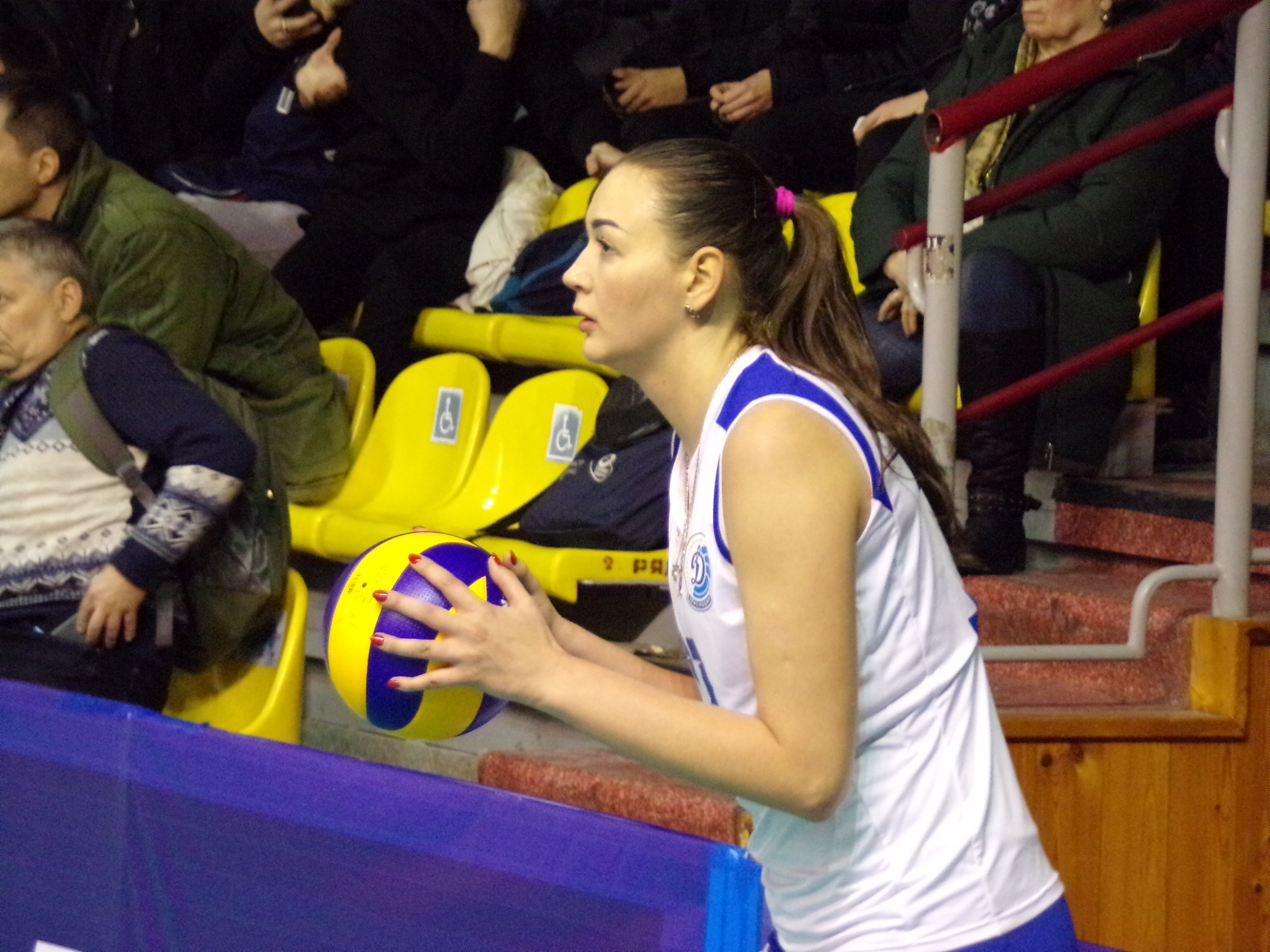
- Chaplina in 2019

Personal information
- Nationality: Russian
- Born: October 23, 1988 (age 38) Sverdlovsk, Soviet Union
- Height: 1.88 m (6 ft 2 in)
- Weight: 77 kg (170 lb)
- Spike: 301 cm (119 in)
- Block: 295 cm (116 in)

Volleyball information
- Current club: (Russia) Leningradka Saint Petersburg
- Number: 11

Victoria Rusakova (born 23 October 1988 Sverdlovsk) is a Russian volleyball player.

She played for the Women's National Team at the 2013 FIVB Women's World Grand Champions Cup. and the 2013 Summer Universiade,

She plays for Leningradka Saint Petersburg.
