= Japan at the 2013 Summer Universiade =

- IOC code: JPN

in Kazan
- Competitors: 417
- Medals Ranked 3rd: Gold 24 Silver 28 Bronze 32 Total 84

Summer Universiade appearances (overview)
- 1959; 1961; 1963; 1965; 1967; 1970; 1973; 1975; 1977; 1979; 1981; 1983; 1985; 1987; 1989; 1991; 1993; 1995; 1997; 1999; 2001; 2003; 2005; 2007; 2009; 2011; 2013; 2015; 2017; 2019; 2021; 2025; 2027

Japan competed at the 2013 Summer Universiade in Kazan, Russia from 6 July to 17 July 2013. The Japanese team consisted of 417 athletes, and won 84 medals (2nd place after Russia), including 24 gold medals (3rd place after Russia and China).

== Medal summary ==
=== Medal by sports ===
Medals by sport
Sport	1st place, gold medalist(s)	2nd place, silver medalist(s)	3rd place, bronze medalist(s)	Total
Athletics	3	5	5	13
Belt wrestling	1	1	0	2
Field hockey	0	0	1	1
Football	0	0	1	1
Gymnastics Artistic	1	2	2	5
Gymnastics Rhythmic	0	2	1	3
Judo	4	2	5	11
Rowing	0	0	1	1
Sambo	2	1	2	5
Shooting	1	0	0	1
Swimming	4	9	5	18
Synchronized swimming	0	4	0	4
Table tennis	2	2	3	7
Tennis	2	1	1	4
Volleyball	0	0	1	1
Weightlifting	1	1	0	2
Wrestling	3	0	3	6
Total	24	28	32	84

=== Medalists ===
Medal	Name	Sport	Event	Date
Gold	Ayuko Suzuki	Athletics	Women's 10,000 metres	7 July
Gold	Kanae Yagi	Weightlifting	Women's 53kg	7 July
Gold	Takanori Nagase	Judo	Men's 81kg	8 July
Gold	Rino Abe	Belt wrestling	Women's 76 kg	8 July
Gold	Tomofumi Takajo	Judo	Men's 66kg	9 July
Gold	Ryōhei Katō	Gymnastics Artistic	Men's floor	10 July
Gold	Shinji Kido	Judo	Men's 60kg	10 July
Gold	Yuki Shirai	Swimming	Men's 100 metre backstroke	11 July
Gold	Yasuhiro Koseki	Swimming	Men's 100 metre breaststroke	11 July
Gold	Shinji Kido; Masaru Momose; Takanori Nagase; Yuki Nishiyama; Ryuko Ogawa; Takeshi Ojitani; Shohei Shimowada; Tomofumi Takajo	Judo	Men's team	11 July
Gold	Mai Tsuda	Athletics	Women's half marathon	12 July
Gold	Ayako Mitsui; Yukiko Okuno; Hitomi Suzuki; Mai Tsuda; Yasuka Ueno	Athletics	Women's half marathon team	12 July
Gold	Yoko Hirano; Yuka Ishigaki; Riyo Nemoto; Misato Niwa; Rika Suzuki	Table tennis	Women's team	12 July
Gold	Eri Tosaka	Wrestling	Women's freestyle 48 kg	13 July
Gold	Hiromitsu Kasahara; Rika Suzuki	Table tennis	Mixed doubles	13 July
Gold	Kohei Yamamoto	Swimming	Men's 800 metre freestyle	14 July
Gold	Hikari Sugawara	Wrestling	Women's freestyle 51 kg	14 July
Gold	Sara Dosho	Wrestling	Women's freestyle 67 kg	14 July
Gold	Rui Takahashi	Sambo	Women's 72 kg	14 July
Gold	Sachie Ishizu; Hiroko Kuwata; Yuki Tanaka	Tennis	Women's team	15 July
Gold	Shori Hamada	Sambo	Women's 80 kg	15 July
Gold	Kona Fujita	Swimming	Women's 200 metre butterfly	16 July
Gold	Mai Toishi	Shooting	Women's 50 metre rifle prone	16 July
Gold	Sachie Ishizu	Tennis	Women's Singles	16 July
Silver	Yu Minobe; Mizuho Nagai; Mizuho Nagai; Sakura Noda; Arisa Tominaga; Shizuka Tozawa	Gymnastics Artistic	Women's artistic team all-around	7 July
Silver	Ryota Yamagata	Athletics	Men's 100 metres	8 July
Silver	Kayoko Sano	Judo	Women's 78kg	8 July
Silver	Yukiko Inui; Risako Mitsui	Synchronized swimming	Women's combined	8 July
Silver	Chisato Haga; Aika Hakoyama; Mayo Itoyama; Hikaru Kazumori; Kei Marumo; Risako Mitsui; Kanami Nakamaki; Misa Sugiyama	Synchronized swimming	Women's team	8 July
Silver	Yoichi Itokazu	Weightlifting	Men's 62 kg	8 July
Silver	Katsuki Sakagami	Belt wrestling	Women's 58 kg	8 July
Silver	Yukiko Inui	Synchronized swimming	Women's duet	9 July
Silver	Chisato Haga; Aika Hakoyama; Yukiko Inui; Mayo Itoyama; Hikaru Kazumori; Kei Marumo; Risako Mitsui; Kanami Nakamaki; Misa Sugiyama	Synchronized swimming	Women's combined	9 July
Silver	Kohei Yamamoto	Swimming	Men's 400 metre freestyle	10 July
Silver	Yusuke Tanaka	Gymnastics Artistic	Men's horizontal bar	10 July
Silver	Masaru Momose	Judo	Men's open weight	10 July
Silver	Ayuko Suzuki	Athletics	Women's 5000 metres	11 July
Silver	Seito Yamamoto	Athletics	Men's pole vault	11 July
Silver	Ryota Yamagata; Yousuke Hara; Rui Yonaguni; Shōta Iizuka	Athletics	Men's 4 × 100 metres relay	12 July
Silver	Shogo Nakamura; Hiroki Yamagishi; Shota Hattori; Toshikatsu Ebina; Yuta Shitara	Athletics	Women's half marathon team	12 July
Silver	Kohei Yamamoto	Swimming	Men's 1500 metre freestyle	12 July
Silver	Hiromasa Fujimori	Swimming	Men's 200 metre individual medley	12 July
Silver	Yuki Hirano; Hiromitsu Kasahara; Koki Niwa; Jin Ueda; Maharu Yoshimura	Table tennis	Men's team	12 July
Silver	Yukihiro Takahashi	Swimming	Men's 200 metre breaststroke	13 July
Silver	Kenta Hirai	Swimming	Men's 200 metre butterfly	13 July
Silver	Koki Niwa; Misato Niwa	Table tennis	Mixed doubles	13 July
Silver	Yuki Shirai	Swimming	Men's 200 metre backstroke	15 July
Silver	Kota Eto	Sambo	Men's 74 kg	15 July
Silver	Takeharu Fujimori	Swimming	Men's 400 metre individual medley	16 July
Silver	Nao Kobayashi	Swimming	Women's 200 metre butterfly	16 July
Silver	Yuki Shirai; Yasuhiro Koseki; Masayuki Umemoto; Katsumi Nakamura	Swimming	Men's 4 x 100 metre medley relay	16 July
Silver	Shota Tagawa; Hiroko Kuwata	Tennis	Mixed Doubles	16 July
Silver	Yukari Hatano; Erika Koga; Naomi Kumazawa; Rina Miura; Ayano Sato; Ayumi Yusa	Gymnastics Rhythmic	Women's rhythmic group 10 clubs	16 July
Silver	Yukari Hatano; Erika Koga; Naomi Kumazawa; Rina Miura; Ayano Sato; Ayumi Yusa	Gymnastics Rhythmic	Women's rhythmic group 3 balls + 2 ribbons	16 July
Bronze	Mai Tsuda	Athletics	Women's 10,000 metres	7 July
Bronze	Mami Umeki	Judo	Women's 78kg	7 July
Bronze	Masato Kobayashi; Hirohide Sakagami; Yusuke Sato; Yusaku Araki	Rowing	Men's lightweight coxless four	7 July
Bronze	Hiroki Ishikawa; Ryōhei Katō; Shogo Nonomura; Yusuke Tanaka; Chihiro Yoshioka	Gymnastics Artistic	Men's artistic team all-around	8 July
Bronze	Yuki Nishiyama	Judo	Men's 73kg	9 July
Bronze	Ai Shishime	Judo	Women's 52kg	9 July
Bronze	Shoko Ono	Judo	Women's 57kg	9 July
Bronze	Shōta Iizuka	Athletics	Men's 200 metres	10 July
Bronze	Fumiya Hidaka	Swimming	Men's 400 metre freestyle	10 July
Bronze	Sakiko Shimizu	Swimming	Women's 400 400 metre individual medley	10 July
Bronze	Ryōhei Katō	Gymnastics Artistic	Men's horizontal bar	10 July
Bronze	Manami Inoue	Judo	Women's open weight	10 July
Bronze	Mai Shoji	Athletics	Women's 5000 metres	11 July
Bronze	Fumitaka Morishita	Wrestling	Men's freestyle 55 kg	11 July
Bronze	Shogo Nakamura	Athletics	Men's half marathon	12 July
Bronze	Yukiko Okuno	Athletics	Women's half marathon	12 July
Bronze	Takahiro Tsutsumi	Swimming	Men's 200 metre individual medley	12 July
Bronze	Kanako Murata	Wrestling	Women's freestyle 55 kg	13 July
Bronze	Nao Kobayashi	Swimming	Women's 100 metre butterfly	14 July
Bronze	Mio Motegi	Swimming	Women's 200 metre breaststroke	14 July
Bronze	Yuka Ishigaki; Riyo Nemoto	Table tennis	Women's doubles	14 July
Bronze	Shota Tanokura	Wrestling	Men's Greco-Roman 55 kg	15 July
Bronze	Yukari Hatano; Erika Koga; Naomi Kumazawa; Rina Miura; Ayano Sato; Ayumi Yusa	Gymnastics Rhythmic	Women's rhythmic group all-around	15 July
Bronze	Koki Niwa	Table tennis	Men's singles	15 July
Bronze	Yuka Ishigaki	Table tennis	Women's singles	15 July
Bronze	Misa Fujii; Saki Hayato; Haruka Higuma; Naho Ichitani; Megumi Kageyama; Risako Kanameishi; Yukari Mano; Aki Mitsuhashi; Yuri Nagai; Ayaka Nishimura; Ayaka Okada; Nanae Ozawa; Shiho Sakai; Minami Shimizu; Izuki Tanaka; Chiharu Urashima; Rui Yamashita; Eriko Yoshiura	Field hockey	Women's tournament	15 July
Bronze	Akane Ikuta	Sambo	Women's 64 kg	15 July
Bronze	Hiroko Kuwata	Tennis	Women's Singles	16 July
Bronze	Haruka Murase	Sambo	Women's +80 kg	16 July
Bronze	Shunsuke Chijiki; Takashi Dekita; Hideomi Fukatsu; Yamato Fushimi; Hidetomo Hoshino; Taichiro Koga; Issei Maeda; Shoh Ozawa; Haku Ri; Tatsuya Shiota; Sogo Watanabe; Shuzo Yamada	Volleyball	Men's tournament	16 July
Bronze	Shuhei Akasaki; Jun Amano; Yusuke Chajima; Eisuke Fujishima; Hiroshi Futami; Jin Izumisawa; Kentaro Kakoi; Shunsuke Kikuchi; Kengo Kitazume; Ryo Kubota; Shintaro Kurumaya; Daiki Matsumoto; Yusuke Minagawa; Kazuki Nagasawa; Teruhito Nakagawa; Shun Obu; Daiki Ogawa; Hokuto Shimoda; Shogo Taniguchi; Masahiro Teraoka	Football	Men's tournament	16 July
