= Athletics at the 2013 Summer Universiade – Women's half marathon =

The women's half marathon at the 2013 Summer Universiade was held on July 12, 2013.

== Medalists ==
=== Individual ===
Gold	Silver	Bronze
Mai Tsuda; Japan	Alina Prokopyeva; Russia	Yukiko Okuno; Japan

=== Team ===
Gold	Silver	Bronze
Japan; Mai Tsuda; Yukiko Okuno; Hitomi Suzuki; Ayako Mitsui; Yasuka Ueno	Russia; Alina Prokopyeva; Lyudmila Lebedeva; Yelena Sedova; Natalya Novichkova; Valentina Galimova	China; Sun Lamei; Gong Lihua; Mei Ying; Zhou Jing

== Results ==
=== Individual standing ===
Rank	Name	Nationality	Time	Notes
1st place, gold medalist(s)	Mai Tsuda	Japan	1:13:12	
2nd place, silver medalist(s)	Alina Prokopyeva	Russia	1:13:18	
3rd place, bronze medalist(s)	Yukiko Okuno	Japan	1:13:24	
4	Lyudmila Lebedeva	Russia	1:13:33	
5	Yelena Sedova	Russia	1:13:58	SB
6	Hitomi Suzuki	Japan	1:14:05	
7	Ayako Mitsui	Japan	1:14:10	
8	Natalya Novichkova	Russia	1:14:31	
9	Yasuka Ueno	Japan	1:14:50	
10	Olga Skrypak	Ukraine	1:15:25	PB
11	Valentina Galimova	Russia	1:15:44	
12	Katarína Berešová	Slovakia	1:15:52	
13	Sun Lamei	China	1:16:31	
14	Volha Mazuronak	Belarus	1:17:07	
15	Sara Prieto	Mexico	1:18:56	
16	Gong Lihua	China	1:19:30	
17	Mei Ying	China	1:21:29	
18	Zhou Jing	China	1:21:42	
19	Monika Raut	India	1:29:00	
20	Thembeka Ngwenya	South Africa	1:32:24	
	Thitshaamba Ravhandalala	South Africa	DNF	
	Cristina Frumuz	Romania	DNS	

=== Team standing ===
Rank	Team	Time	Notes
1st place, gold medalist(s)	Japan	3:40:41	
2nd place, silver medalist(s)	Russia	3:40:49	
3rd place, bronze medalist(s)	China	3:57:30	
