= Field hockey at the 2013 Summer Universiade – Women's tournament =

Women's field hockey at the XXVII Summer Universiade
- Venue: Field Hockey Centre
- Dates: July 7, 2013 – July 15, 2013

Medalists
1st place, gold medalist(s)		South Korea (KOR)
2nd place, silver medalist(s)		Russia (RUS)
3rd place, bronze medalist(s)		Japan (JPN)

The women's tournament of field hockey at the 2013 Summer Universiade was held from July 7 to 15 in Kazan, Russia.

== Results ==
=== Preliminary round ===
Pos	Team	Pld	W	D	L	GF	GA	GD	Pts	Qualification
1	South Korea	3	3	0	0	11	2	+9	9	Final
2	Russia	3	1	1	1	6	6	0	4	Final
3	Japan	3	1	0	2	6	7	−1	3	
4	Belarus	3	0	1	2	3	11	−8	1	

Source: Universiade2013
Rules for classification: 1) points; 2) goal difference; 3) goals scored; 4) head-to-head result.

==== Pool matches ====
9 July 2013
16:00

South Korea	5–1	Belarus
Park K. 14'; Cho E. 22', 70'; Kim J. 43'; Han 52'	Report	Mikheichyk 44'

Umpires:
Ivona Makar (CRO)
Junko Wagatsuma (JPN)

9 July 2013
19:45

Russia	3–2	Japan
Shaburova 16'; Svezhentseva 39'; Goncharevskaya 45'	Report	Mitsuhashi 4'; Ichitani 23'

Umpires:
Ana Faias (POR)
Lim Mi-Sook (KOR)

10 July 2013
13:30

Japan	4–0	Belarus
Higuma 23'; Nishimura 35'; Ozawa 57'; Sakai 62'	Report

Umpires:
Natalia Kovaleva (RUS)
Ana Faias (POR)

11 July 2013
13:30

South Korea	2–1	Russia
Cho E. 12'; Park K. 23'	Report	Sorokina 53'

Umpires:
Junko Wagatsuma (JPN)
Ivona Makar (CRO)

12 July 2013
16:00

Japan	0–4	South Korea
	Report	Han 5', 22'; Cho Y. 40'; Cho E. 47'

Umpires:
Natalia Kovaleva (RUS)
Ana Faias (POR)

12 July 2013
18:00

Russia	2–2	Belarus
Salamatina 42'; Sorokina 51'	Report	Mikheichyk 59'; Syrayezhka 64'

Umpires:
Junko Wagatsuma (JPN)
Lim Mi-Sook (KOR)

=== Classification round ===
==== Bronze-medal match ====
14 July 2013
16:00

Japan	3–1	Belarus
Nagai 66', 67'; Nishimura 69'	Report	Kulinkovich 2'

Umpires:
Natalia Kovaleva (RUS)
Lim Mi-Sook (KOR)

==== Gold-medal match ====
14 July 2013
18:15

South Korea	5–0	Russia
Park S. 5'; Han 9'; Kim J. 30', 37'; Cho E. 39'	Report

Umpires:
Ana Faias (POR)
Ivona Makar (CRO)

== Statistics ==
=== Final standings ===
Pos	Team	Pld	W	D	L	GF	GA	GD	Pts	Final Result
1st place, gold medalist(s)	South Korea	4	4	0	0	16	2	+14	12	Gold Medal
2nd place, silver medalist(s)	Russia	4	1	1	2	6	11	−5	4	Silver Medal
3rd place, bronze medalist(s)	Japan	4	2	0	2	9	8	+1	6	Bronze Medal
4	Belarus	4	0	1	3	4	14	−10	1	

Source: Universiade2013

=== Goalscorers ===
There were 35 goals scored in 8 matches, for an average of 4.38 goals per match.

5 goals

- (South Korea) Cho Eun-ji

4 goals

- (South Korea) Han Hye-lyoung

3 goals

- (South Korea) Kim Jong-eun

2 goals

- (Belarus) Yuliya Mikheichyk
- (Japan) Yuri Nagai
- (Japan) Ayaka Nishimura
- (Russia) Evgenia Sorokina
- (South Korea) Park Ki-ju

1 goal

- (Belarus) Krestina Kulinkovich
- (Belarus) Nastassiya Syrayezhka
- (Japan) Haruka Higuma
- (Japan) Naho Ichitani
- (Japan) Aki Mitsuhashi
- (Japan) Nanae Ozawa
- (Japan) Shiho Sakai
- (Russia) Elizaveta Goncharevskaya
- (Russia) Svetlana Salamatina
- (Russia) Ekaterina Shaburova
- (Russia) Ksenia Svezhentseva
- (South Korea) Cho Yunk-young
- (South Korea) Park Seung-a
