= Athletics at the 2013 Summer Universiade – Women's 10,000 metres =

The women's 10,000 metres event at the 2013 Summer Universiade was held on 7 July.

== Medalists ==
Gold	Silver	Bronze
Ayuko Suzuki; Japan	Alina Prokopyeva; Russia	Mai Tsuda; Japan

== Results ==
Rank	Name	Nationality	Time	Notes
1st place, gold medalist(s)	Ayuko Suzuki	Japan	32:54.17	
2nd place, silver medalist(s)	Alina Prokopyeva	Russia	33:00.93	
3rd place, bronze medalist(s)	Mai Tsuda	Japan	33:14.59	
4	Mai Shoji	Japan	33:22.83	
5	Natalia Puchkova	Russia	33:27.52	
6	Carla Salomé Rocha	Portugal	33:44.27	
7	Olga Skrypak	Ukraine	33:55.56	SB
8	Natalia Leonteva	Russia	34:06.65	
9	Rhiannon Johns	Canada	34:18.46	
10	Annet Chebet	Uganda	34:24.20	PB
11	Devadsa Thara Muttiyithodi	India	36:23.77	
12	Grete Tonne	Estonia	36:32.06	
