= Antso Rakotondramanga =

Malagasy tennis player (born 1988)

- Country (sports): Madagascar
- Born: 14 July 1988 (age 38) Paris, France
- Plays: Right-handed (two-handed backhand)
- Prize money: $6,412

Singles
- Career record: 17–9 (at ATP Tour level, Grand Slam level, and in Davis Cup)
- Career titles: 0
- Highest ranking: No. 1009 (29 April 2013)

Doubles
- Career record: 10–10 (at ATP Tour level, Grand Slam level, and in Davis Cup)
- Career titles: 3 ITF
- Highest ranking: No. 734 (4 November 2013)
- Last updated on: 20 March 2017.

Antso Rakotondramanga (born 14 July 1988) is a Malagasy tennis player who was born in Paris, France.

Rakotondramanga has a career high ATP singles ranking of 1009 achieved on 29 April 2013. He also has a career high ATP doubles ranking of 734 achieved on 4 November 2013.

Rakotondramanga represents Madagascar at the Davis Cup where he has a W/L record of 27–19. Rakotondramanga also earned himself a silver medal in the Men's Singles at the 2013 Summer Universiade. Rakotondramanga also competed in the Men's Doubles at the same games with V. Rakotondramanga.
