= Kim Dae-yoong =

South Korean sport shooter

Personal information
- Nationality: South Korea
- Born: 18 February 1988 (age 38) Seoul, South Korea
- Height: 1.69 m (5 ft 6 1/2 in)
- Weight: 65 kg (143 lb)

Korean name
- Hangul: 김대웅
- RR: Gim Daeung
- MR: Kim Taeung

Sport
- Sport: Shooting
- Event: 25 m rapid fire pistol (Rapid Fire Pistol)
- Club: KB Kookmin Bank Club
- Coached by: Son Sang-Won
Medal record
Men's shooting
Representing South Korea
Asian Championships
Bronze medal – third place	2012 Doha	25 m rapid fire pistol team

Kim Dae-yoong (Korean: 김대웅; born February 18, 1988, in Seoul) is a South Korean sport shooter. He won a bronze medal in the men's rapid fire pistol at the 2012 ISSF World Cup series in Munich, Germany, with a total score of 585 points and a bonus of 25 from the final, earning him a spot on the South Korean team for the Olympics. Kim is also a member of the shooting team for KB Kookmin Bank Club, and is coached and trained by Son Sang-Won.

Kim represented South Korea at the 2012 Summer Olympics in London, where he competed in the men's 25 m rapid fire pistol. Kim scored a total of 579 targets (290 on the first stage and 289 on the second) and a bonus of 20 inner tens in the qualifying rounds by one point behind Czech shooter and two-time Olympian Martin Strnad, finishing only in tenth place.
