= Ayuko Suzuki =

Japanese long-distance runner

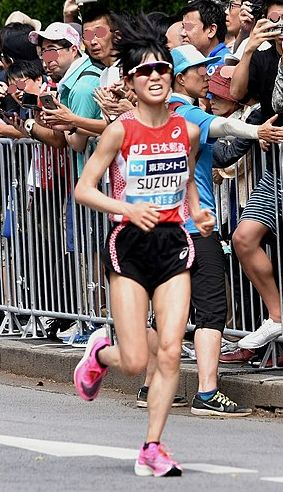
- Suzuki in 2019

Personal information
- Born: 8 October 1991 (age 34) Toyohashi, Aichi Prefecture, Japan
- Education: Nagoya University
- Height: 1.54 m (5 ft 1 in)
- Weight: 38 kg (84 lb)

Sport
- Sport: Track and field
- Events: 1500-10,000 m, Marathon
- Club: Japan Post Holdings
- Coached by: Masahiko Takahashi

Achievements and titles
- Personal bests: 1500 m – 4:18.75 (2010); 3000 m – 8:58.08 (2014); 5000 m – 15:08.29 (2015); 10,000 m – 31:18.16 (2016); Marathon – 2:22:02 (2022)

Ayuko Suzuki (鈴木 亜由子, Suzuki Ayuko; born 8 October 1991) is a Japanese long-distance runner. She competed in the 5000 metres at the 2015 World Championships in Beijing finishing ninth. In addition, she won two medals at the 2013 Summer Universiade.

== International competitions ==
Representing Japan
Year	Competition	Venue	Position	Event	Notes
2010	World Junior Championships	Moncton, Canada	5th	5000 m	15:47.36
2013	Universiade	Kazan, Russia	2nd	5000 m	15:51.47
2013	Universiade	Kazan, Russia	1st	10,000 m	32:54.17
2015	World Championships	Beijing, China	9th	5000 m	15:08.29
2016	Olympic Games	Rio de Janeiro, Brazil	24th (h)	5000 m	15:41.81
2017	World Championships	London, United Kingdom	26th (h)	5000 m	15:24.86
2017	World Championships	London, United Kingdom	10th	10,000 m	31:27.30
2021	Olympic Games	Sapporo, Japan	19th	Marathon	2:33:14
2022	Berlin Marathon	Berlin, Germany	8th	Marathon	2:22:02
