= Athletics at the 2013 Summer Universiade – Women's 5000 metres =

The women's 5000 metres event at the 2013 Summer Universiade was held on 11 July. The original winner, Roxana Bârcă, tested positive for a prohibited substance after the competition and was subsequently disqualified.

== Results ==
Rank	Name	Nationality	Time	Notes
1st place, gold medalist(s)	Olga Golovkina	Russia	15:43.77	
2nd place, silver medalist(s)	Ayuko Suzuki	Japan	15:51.47	
3rd place, bronze medalist(s)	Mai Shoji	Japan	16:11.90	
4	Dudu Karakaya	Turkey	16:12.77	
5	Carla Salomé Rocha	Portugal	16:24.14	
6	Annet Chebet	Uganda	16:38.37	PB
7	Cristina Frumuz	Romania	16:39.07	
8	Shinetsetseg Chuluunkhuu	Mongolia	17:25.02	
9	Demeku Akalu	Ethiopia	17:37.45	
10	Pooja Varade	India	17:54.71	
11	Esther Adwubi	Ghana	19:11.20	PB
12	Vongai Chamunorwa	Zimbabwe	19:39.06	
	Alfiya Muriasova	Russia	DNF	
	~~Roxana Bârcă~~	~~Romania~~	~~15:39.76~~	DQ
	Simone Glad	Denmark	DNS	
	Gong Lihua	China	DNS	
	Moleboheng Mafata	Lesotho	DNS	
	Zhou Jing	China	DNS	
