= Sylwia Zagórska =

Polish tennis player (born 1990)

- Country (sports): Poland
- Born: 2 May 1989 (age 36) Poland
- Turned pro: 2006
- Retired: 2014
- Plays: Right-handed
- Prize money: US$ 30,758

Singles
- Career record: 100–91
- Career titles: 1 ITF
- Highest ranking: No. 460 (17 June 2013)

Doubles
- Career record: 107–73
- Career titles: 9 ITF
- Highest ranking: No. 400 (7 July 2008)
Medal record
Women's tennis
Representing Poland
Summer Universiade
Bronze medal – third place	2013 Kazan	Women's Doubles

Sylwia Zagórska (born 2 May 1990) is a Polish retired tennis player.

Zagórska won one singles title and nine doubles titles on the ITF Circuit during her career. On 17 June 2013, she reached her best singles ranking of world No. 460. On 7 July 2008, she peaked at No. 400 in the doubles rankings.

In 2013, she played for Poland on the XXVII Universiade in Kazan (Russia) where she won the bronze medal in women's doubles.

== ITF Circuit finals ==
=== Singles: 3 (1 title, 2 runner–ups) ===
Legend $25,000 tournaments $10,000 tournaments	Finals by surface Hard (0–2) Clay (1–0)

Result	W–L	Date	Tournament	Tier	Surface	Opponent	Score
Win	1–0	Nov 2007	ITF Mallorca, Spain	10,000	Clay	(Romania) Diana Enache	6–1, 7–6^{(2)}
Loss	1–1	Oct 2012	ITF Mytilini, Greece	10,000	Hard	(Greece) Despoina Vogasari	1–6, 6–2, 4–6
Loss	1–2	Jun 2013	ITF Sharm El Sheikh, Egypt	10,000	Hard	(Austria) Lisa-Maria Moser	2–6, 4–6

=== Doubles: 21 (9 titles, 12 runner–ups) ===
Result	W–L	Date	Tournament	Tier	Surface	Partner	Opponents	Score
Loss	0–1	Aug 2007	ITF Koksijde, Belgium	10,000	Clay	(Poland) Olga Brózda	(France) Émilie Bacquet (France) Samantha Schoeffel	1–6, 1–6
Loss	0–2	Sep 2007	ITF Kędzierzyn-Koźle, Poland	10,000	Clay	(Poland) Olga Brózda	(Slovakia) Michaela Pochabová (Slovakia) Patrícia Verešová	2–6, 4–6
Win	1–2	Sep 2007	ITF Lleida, Spain	10,000	Clay	(Romania) Mădălina Gojnea	(Portugal) Catarina Ferreira (Spain) Sheila Solsona-Carcasona	7–6^{(8)}, 6–1
Loss	1–3	Sep 2007	ITF Thessaloniki, Greece	10,000	Clay	(Poland) Olga Brózda	(Italy) Nicole Clerico (Greece) Anna Koumantou	6–4, 4–6, [9–11]
Win	2–3	Oct 2007	ITF Espinho, Portugal	10,000	Clay	(Slovakia) Romana Tabak	(Armenia) Liudmila Nikoyan (Russia) Inna Sokolova	3–6, 6–1, [10–4]
Win	3–3	Nov 2007	ITF Mallorca, Spain	10,000	Clay	(Russia) Marina Melnikova	(Israel) Julia Glushko (France) Charlène Vanneste	6–4, 6–4
Win	4–3	Sep 2008	ITF Sandanski, Bulgaria	10,000	Clay	(Romania) Laura Ioana Paar	(Romania) Elena Bogdan (Ukraine) Alyona Sotnikova	6–3, 6–1
Loss	4–4	Oct 2009	ITF Antalya, Turkey	10,000	Clay	(Poland) Barbara Sobaszkiewicz	(Netherlands) Kiki Bertens (Netherlands) Marcella Koek	4–6, 6–0, [4–10]
Loss	4–5	Nov 2009	ITF El Menzah, Tunisia	10,000	Hard	(Poland) Barbara Sobaszkiewicz	(Netherlands) Elise Tamaëla (Netherlands) Nicole Thyssen	4–6, 1–6
Win	5–5	Jun 2010	ITF Lenzerheide, Switzerland	10,000	Clay	(Poland) Olga Brózda	(Italy) Martina Caciotti (Italy) Nicole Clerico	4–6, 6–1, [10–5]
Win	6–5	Apr 2011	ITF Antalya, Turkey	10,000	Clay	(Romania) Laura Ioana Paar	(Russia) Marta Sirotkina (Russia) Maria Zharkova	6–1, 7–6^{(0)}
Loss	6–6	Jun 2011	ITF Cantanhede, Portugal	10,000	Carpet	(Poland) Natalia Siedliska	(United States) Danielle Mills (United States) Kayla Rizzolo	5–7, 1–6
Loss	6–7	Jun 2011	ITF Enschede, Netherlands	10,000	Carpet	(Poland) Natalia Siedliska	(Germany) Anna-Maria Levers (Germany) Catrin Levers	1–6, 6–7^{(4)}
Win	7–7	Sep 2011	ITF Porto Rafti, Greece	10,000	Hard	(Poland) Natalia Siedliska	(Poland) Veronika Domagała (Poland) Natalia Kołat	6–4, 6–0
Loss	7–8	Sep 2011	ITF Athens, Greece	10,000	Clay	(Poland) Natalia Siedliska	(Hungary) Vanda Lukács (Germany) Christina Shakovets	3–6, 2–6
Loss	7–9	Apr 2012	Wiesbaden Open, Germany	10,000	Clay	(Russia) Alexandra Romanova	(Germany) Laura Siegemund (United States) Caitlin Whoriskey	0–6, 0–6
Win	8–9	May 2012	ITF İzmir, Turkey	10,000	Hard	(Poland) Natalia Siedliska	(Mexico) Nadia Abdalá (Russia) Yana Sizikova	6–4, 6–3
Loss	8–10	Aug 2012	ITF Ratingen, Germany	10,000	Clay	(Germany) Kim Grajdek	(Georgia (country)) Ekaterine Gorgodze (Georgia (country)) Sofia Kvatsabaia	3–6, 4–6
Loss	8–11	Aug 2012	ITF Braunschweig, Germany	10,000	Clay	(Germany) Kim Grajdek	(Bosnia and Herzegovina) Jasmina Kajtazovič (Russia) Anna Smolina	1–6, 3–6
Win	9–11	Mar 2013	ITF Sharm El Sheikh, Egypt	10,000	Hard	(Germany) Kim Grajdek	(Spain) Beatriz Morales Hernández (Serbia) Andjela Novčić	6–2, 6–1
Loss	9–12	Jun 2013	ITF Sharm El Sheikh, Egypt	10,000	Hard	(Russia) Alina Mikheeva	(Belarus) Lidziya Marozava (India) Kyra Shroff	4–6, 2–6
