= Lee Hua-chen =

Taiwanese tennis player

Lee Hua-chen 李花塵
- Country (sports): Chinese Taipei
- Residence: Kaohsiung, Taiwan
- Born: 14 September 1993 (age 31); Kaohsiung
- Plays: Right (two-handed backhand)
- Prize money: $65,468

Singles
- Career record: 176–96
- Career titles: 10 ITF
- Highest ranking: No. 325 (5 August 2019)

Doubles
- Career record: 96–76
- Career titles: 7 ITF
- Highest ranking: No. 283 (22 April 2013)
Medal record
Representing Chinese Taipei
Women's tennis
Summer Universiade
| Bronze medal – third place | 2013 Kazan | Mixed doubles |

Lee Hua-chen
- Traditional Chinese: 李花塵
- Simplified Chinese: 李花尘
Transcriptions
Standard Mandarin
- Hanyu Pinyin: Lǐ Huāchén

Lee Hua-chen (Chinese: 李花塵; born 14 September 1993), also known as Jasmine Lee, is a Taiwanese former tennis player.

== Career ==
Her career-high WTA rankings are 325 in singles, achieved on 5 August 2019, and 283 in doubles, reached on 22 April 2013. Lee won ten singles titles and seven doubles titles on the ITF Women's Circuit.

Playing for Chinese Taipei Fed Cup team, she has a win–loss record of 2–0.

== ITF Circuit finals ==
=== Singles: 17 (10 titles, 7 runner–ups) ===
| Legend $25,000 tournaments $15,000 tournaments $10,000 tournaments | Finals by surface Hard (8–7) Clay (2–0) |

| Result | W–L | Date | Tournament | Tier | Surface | Opponent | Score |
|---|---|---|---|---|---|---|---|
| Win | 1–0 | Aug 2011 | ITF Taipei, Taiwan | 10,000 | Hard | (Chinese Taipei) Lee Ya-hsuan | 6–2, 6–2 |
| Loss | 1–1 | Sep 2011 | ITF Yeongwol, South Korea | 10,000 | Hard | (South Korea) Yoo Mi | 1–6, 3–6 |
| Loss | 1–2 | Jul 2012 | ITF New Orleans, United States | 10,000 | Hard | (United States) Julia Elbaba | 5–7, 6–4, 3–6 |
| Loss | 1–3 | Dec 2013 | ITF Djibouti | 10,000 | Hard | (Austria) Barbara Haas | 4–6, 3–6 |
| Loss | 1–4 | Dec 2013 | ITF Djibouti | 10,000 | Hard | (Austria) Barbara Haas | 3–6, 3–6 |
| Win | 2–4 | Jun 2016 | ITF Kaohsiung, Taiwan | 10,000 | Hard | (Thailand) Peangtarn Plipuech | 6–7^{(4)}, 6–0, 6–0 |
| Win | 3–4 | Jul 2017 | ITF Hua Hin, Thailand | 15,000 | Hard | (Thailand) Bunyawi Thamchaiwat | 6–2, 3–0 ret. |
| Loss | 3–5 | Aug 2017 | ITF Nonthaburi, Thailand | 15,000 | Hard | (Japan) Haruka Kaji | 4–6, 1–6 |
| Loss | 3–6 | Sep 2017 | ITF Hua Hin, Thailand | 15,000 | Hard | (India) Rutuja Bhosale | 4–6, 6–2, 5–7 |
| Win | 4–6 | Sep 2017 | ITF Hua Hin, Thailand | 15,000 | Hard | (Belgium) Tamaryn Hendler | 6–2, 6–2 |
| Win | 5–6 | Sep 2018 | ITF Nonthaburi, Thailand | 15,000 | Hard | (Thailand) Nudnida Luangnam | 6–2, 6–2 |
| Loss | 5–7 | Sep 2018 | ITF Nonthaburi, Thailand | 15,000 | Hard | (Thailand) Patcharin Cheapchandej | 6–3, 6–7^{(8)}, 2–6 |
| Win | 6–7 | Sep 2018 | ITF Anning, China | 15,000 | Clay | (China) Yang Ziyi | 6–2, 6–2 |
| Win | 7–7 | Sep 2018 | ITF Anning, China | 15,000 | Clay | (China) Sun Xuliu | 6–0, 6–1 |
| Win | 8–7 | Nov 2018 | ITF Nonthaburi, Thailand | 15,000 | Hard | (Thailand) Nudnida Luangnam | 6–4, 6–4 |
| Win | 9–7 | Nov 2018 | ITF Nonthaburi, Thailand | 15,000 | Hard | (Thailand) Anchisa Chanta | 6–4, 6–1 |
| Win | 10–7 | Mar 2019 | Kōfu International Open, Japan | 25,000 | Hard | (Germany) Stephanie Wagner | 6–7^{(4)}, 6–3, 6–4 |

=== Doubles: 14 (7–7) ===
| Legend $25,000 tournaments $15,000 tournaments $10,000 tournaments | Finals by surface Hard (7–6) Clay (0–1) |

| Outcome | No. | Date | Tournament | Surface | Partner | Opponents | Score |
|---|---|---|---|---|---|---|---|
| Runner-up | 1. | 11 September 2011 | ITF Yeongwol, South Korea | Hard | (Chinese Taipei) Lee Pei-chi | (South Korea) Kim Jin-hee (South Korea) Kim Ji-young | 1–6, 1–6 |
| Runner-up | 2. | 26 February 2012 | ITF Antalya, Turkey | Clay | (Chinese Taipei) Lee Pei-chi | (Belarus) Ksenia Milevskaya (Ukraine) Yuliya Beygelzimer | 3–6, 6–7^{(4)} |
| Winner | 3. | 9 June 2012 | ITF Taipei, Taiwan | Hard (i) | (Chinese Taipei) Kao Shao-yuan | (Chinese Taipei) Lee Ya-hsuan (Chinese Taipei) Hsu Ching-wen | 6–3, 6–3 |
| Runner-up | 4. | 27 October 2012 | ITF Taipei, Taiwan | Hard | (Chinese Taipei) Kao Shao-yuan | (Chinese Taipei) Chan Chin-wei (France) Caroline Garcia | 6–4, 4–6, [6–10] |
| Runner-up | 5. | 14 April 2013 | ITF Pelham, United States | Hard | (Chinese Taipei) Kao Shao-yuan | (Australia) Ashleigh Barty (Australia) Arina Rodionova | 4–6, 2–6 |
| Winner | 6. | 8 June 2013 | ITF Taipei, Taiwan | Hard | (Chinese Taipei) Kao Shao-yuan | (Chinese Taipei) Chan Chin-wei (Chinese Taipei) Hsu Wen-hsin | 4–6, 6–3, [10–7] |
| Winner | 7. | 30 August 2013 | ITF New Delhi, India | Hard | (Japan) Akari Inoue | (Sweden) Matilda Hamlin (India) Shweta Chandra Rana | 6–0, 7–6^{(3)} |
| Runner-up | 8. | 13 October 2013 | ITF Antalya, Turkey | Clay | (Kazakhstan) Asiya Dair | (Germany) Anna Klasen (Germany) Charlotte Klasen | 6–7^{(2)}, 2-6 |
| Winner | 9. | 6 December 2013 | ITF Djibouti | Hard | (Russia) Yana Sizikova | (India) Shweta Chandra Rana (China) Wang Xiyao | 6–3, 6–3 |
| Winner | 10. | 2 December 2013 | ITF Djibouti | Hard | (Russia) Yana Sizikova | (Russia) Margalita Lazareva (Ukraine) Kateryna Sliusar | 4–6, 6–3, [10–4] |
| Runner-up | 11. | 28 April 2014 | ITF Bangkok, Thailand | Hard | (India) Shweta Chandra Rana | (Thailand) Nungnadda Wannasuk (Thailand) Varunya Wongteanchai | 6–1, 3–6, [8–10] |
| Runner-up | 12. | 25 June 2016 | ITF Kaohsiung, Taiwan | Hard | (Chinese Taipei) Cho I-hsuan | (Chinese Taipei) Chien Pei-ju (Chinese Taipei) Lee Pei-chi | 5–7, 2–6 |
| Winner | 13. | 28 July 2018 | ITF Taipei, Taiwan | Hard | (Chinese Taipei) Joanna Garland | (Chinese Taipei) Chan Chin-wei (Japan) Kotomi Takahata | 6–1, 3–6, [10–1] |
| Winner | 14. | 2 November 2018 | ITF Nonthaburi, Thailand | Hard | (Thailand) Chompoothip Jundakate | (Thailand) Supapitch Kuearum (Kazakhstan) Dariya Detkovskaya | 6–1, 6–3 |
