= Indonesia at the 2013 Summer Universiade =

- IOC code: INA
- National federation: Indonesia University Sports Council
- Website: www.nocindonesia.or.id

in Kazan
- Competitors: 34
- Medals Ranked 52nd: Gold 0 Silver 1 Bronze 0 Total 1

Summer Universiade appearances
- 1959; 1961; 1963; 1965; 1967; 1970; 1973; 1975; 1977; 1979; 1981; 1983; 1985; 1987; 1989; 1991; 1993; 1995; 1997; 1999; 2001; 2003; 2005; 2007; 2009; 2011; 2013; 2015; 2017; 2019; 2021; 2025; 2027

Indonesia competed at the 2013 Summer Universiade in Kazan, Russia. 34 student-athletes will participate on its competition program.

== Medalists ==
Medal	Name	Sport	Event	Date
Silver	Surahmat bin Suwito Wijoyo	Weightlifting	Men's 56 kg	7 July
