= Alina Prokopeva =

Russian long-distance runner

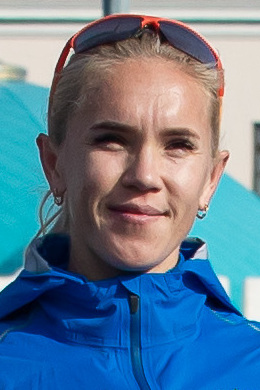

Personal information
- Born: 16 August 1985 (age 41)

Sport
- Country: Russia
- Sport: Track and field
- Event: long-distance running
- Updated on 2 September 2015

Alina Prokopeva (born 16 August 1985, v. Arino) is a female Russian long-distance runner. She competed in the marathon event at the 2015 World Championships in Athletics in Beijing, China.

== See also ==
- Russia at the 2015 World Championships in Athletics
