= Thailand at the 2013 Summer Universiade =

- IOC code: THA
- NOC: National Olympic Committee of Thailand
- Website: www.olympicthai.or.th (in Thai and English)

in Kazan, Russia 6 – 17 July 2013
- Competitors: 82
- Medals Ranked 23rd: Gold 2 Silver 7 Bronze 6 Total 15

Summer Universiade appearances (overview)
- 1985; 1987; 1989; 1991; 1993; 1995; 1997; 1999; 2001; 2003; 2005; 2007; 2009; 2011; 2013; 2015; 2017; 2019; 2021; 2025; 2027

The Thailand competed at the 2013 Summer Universiade in Kazan, Russia from 6 to 17 July 2013. 82 athletes were a part of the Thailand team.

Thailand has won 15 medals (19th place), including 2 gold medals.

== Medals by sport ==
Medals by sport
Sport	1st place, gold medalist(s)	2nd place, silver medalist(s)	3rd place, bronze medalist(s)	Total
Shooting	1	4	2	7
Badminton	1		2	3
Weightlifting		2	1	3
Tennis		1		1
Volleyball			1	1
Total	2	7	6	15

== Medalists ==
Medal	Name	Sport	Event	Date
Gold	Tanongsak Saensomboonsuk	Badminton	Men's singles	11 July
Gold	Isarapa Imprasertsuk	Shooting	Skeet Women's	14 July
Silver	Kittima Sutanan	Weightlifting	Women's 53 kg	7 July
Silver	Chitchanok Pulsabsakul	Weightlifting	Women's +75 kg	11 July
Silver	Tanyaporn Prucksakorn	Shooting	10 metre air pistol	12 July
Silver	Noppawan Lertcheewakarn; Varatchaya Wongteanchai	Tennis	Women's doubles	15 July
Silver	Nutchaya Sut-Arporn; Isarapa Imprasertsuk; Nutcha Sut-Arporn	Shooting	Skeet Women's team	16 July
Silver	Thanyalak Chotphibunsin	Shooting	50 metre rifle prone	16 July
Silver	Thanyalak Chotphibunsin; Sununta Majchacheep; Vitchuda Pichitkanjanakul	Shooting	50 metre rifle prone	16 July
Bronze	Savitree Amitrapai; Akarawin Apisuk; Inkarat Apisuk; Pacharakamol Arkornsakul; Porntip Buranaprasertsuk; Chanida Julrattanamanee; Suwat Phaisansomsuk; Pisit Poodchalat; Rawinda Prajongjai; Tanongsak Saensomboonsuk; Pijtjan Wangpaiboonkij; Sermsin Wongyaprom	Badminton	Mixed team	7 July
Bronze	Panida Khamsri	Weightlifting	Women's 48 kg	7 July
Bronze	Porntip Buranaprasertsuk	Badminton	Women's Singles	10 July
Bronze	Tanyaporn Prucksakorn; Kanokkan Chaimongkol; Pattarasuda Sowsa-Nga	Shooting	10m Air Pistol Women's Team	12 July
Bronze	Jarasporn Bundasak; Tapaphaipun Chaisri; Pornpun Guedpard; Amporn Hyapha; Kaewkalaya Kamulthala; Malika Kanthong; Sontaya Keawbundit; Thatdao Nuekjang; Piyanut Pannoy; Em-orn Phanusit; Onuma Sittirak; Nootsara Tomkom	Volleyball	Women's team	15 July
Bronze	Tanyaporn Prucksakorn	Shooting	25m Pistol Women's	16 July
