= Australia at the 2013 Summer Universiade =

- IOC code: AUS

in Kazan
- Competitors: 153
- Medals Ranked 10th: Gold 6 Silver 4 Bronze 6 Total 16

Summer Universiade appearances (overview)
- 1967; 1970; 1973; 1975; 1977; 1979; 1981; 1983; 1985; 1987; 1989; 1991; 1993; 1995; 1997; 1999; 2001; 2003; 2005; 2007; 2009; 2011; 2013; 2015; 2017; 2019; 2021; 2025; 2027

Australia competed at the 2013 Summer Universiade in Kazan, Russia from 6-17 July July 2013. 153 athletes are a part of the Australian.

Australia won 16 medals in total (15th place) including 6 gold medals (10th place).
