= Czech Republic at the 2013 Summer Universiade =

- IOC code: CZE

in Kazan
- Competitors: 162
- Medals Ranked 20th: Gold 3 Silver 6 Bronze 7 Total 16

Summer Universiade appearances (overview)
- 1993; 1995; 1997; 1999; 2001; 2003; 2005; 2007; 2009; 2011; 2013; 2015; 2017; 2019; 2021; 2025; 2027

Czech Republic competed at the 2013 Summer Universiade in Kazan, Russia from 6 July to 17 July 2013. 162 athletes are a part of the Czech team.

Czech Republic has won 16 medals, including 3 gold medals.
