= Poland at the 2013 Summer Universiade =

- IOC code: POL

in Kazan
- Competitors: 314 in 20 sports
- Medals Ranked 12th: Gold 5 Silver 9 Bronze 16 Total 30

Summer Universiade appearances
- 1959; 1961; 1963; 1965; 1967; 1970; 1973; 1975; 1977; 1979; 1981; 1983; 1985; 1987; 1989; 1991; 1993; 1995; 1997; 1999; 2001; 2003; 2005; 2007; 2009; 2011; 2013; 2015; 2017; 2019; 2021

Poland competed at the 2013 Summer Universiade in Kazan, Russia represented by 230 athletes.

The team won 30 medals (9th place) including 5 gold medals (12th place).

== Basketball ==
=== Women ===
The women's team will participate in Group A.

== Field hockey ==
The men's team will participate in Group A.
