= Chinese Taipei at the 2013 Summer Universiade =

- IOC code: TPE
- NOC: Chinese Taipei University Sports Federation (中華民國大專院校體育總會)
- Website: web2.ctusf.org.tw/index.php

in Kazan
- Competitors: 136
- Medals Ranked 16th: Gold 4 Silver 4 Bronze 7 Total 15

Summer Universiade appearances (overview)
- 1989; 1991; 1993; 1995; 1997; 1999; 2001; 2003; 2005; 2007; 2009; 2011; 2013; 2015; 2017; 2019; 2021; 2025; 2027

Chinese Taipei competed at the 2013 Summer Universiade in Kazan, Russia from 6 July to 17 July 2013. 136 athletes are part of the Taipei team.

Chinese Taipei has won 15 medals, including 4 gold medals.
