= China at the 2013 Summer Universiade =

- IOC code: CHN

in Kazan
- Competitors: 294
- Medals Ranked 2nd: Gold 28 Silver 27 Bronze 23 Total 78

Summer Universiade appearances (overview)
- 1979; 1981; 1983; 1985; 1987; 1989; 1991; 1993; 1995; 1997; 1999; 2001; 2003; 2005; 2007; 2009; 2011; 2013; 2015; 2017; 2019; 2021; 2025; 2027

People's Republic of China competed at the 2013 Summer Universiade in Kazan, Russia from 6 July to 17 July 2013. 294 athletes are a part of the Chinese team.

China has won 77 medals (common with Ukraine 3rd place after Russia and Japan), including 26 gold medals (2nd place after Russia).
