= United States at the 2013 Summer Universiade =

- IOC code: USA
- NOC: United States Olympic Committee
- Website: www.teamusa.org

in Kazan
- Competitors: 290 in 18 sports
- Medals Ranked 7th: Gold 11 Silver 14 Bronze 15 Total 40

Summer Universiade appearances (overview)
- 1965; 1967; 1970; 1973; 1975; 1977; 1979; 1981; 1983; 1985; 1987; 1989; 1991; 1993; 1995; 1997; 1999; 2001; 2003; 2005; 2007; 2009; 2011; 2013; 2015; 2017; 2019; 2021; 2025; 2027

The United States competed at the 2013 Summer Universiade in Kazan, Russia, in July 2013.

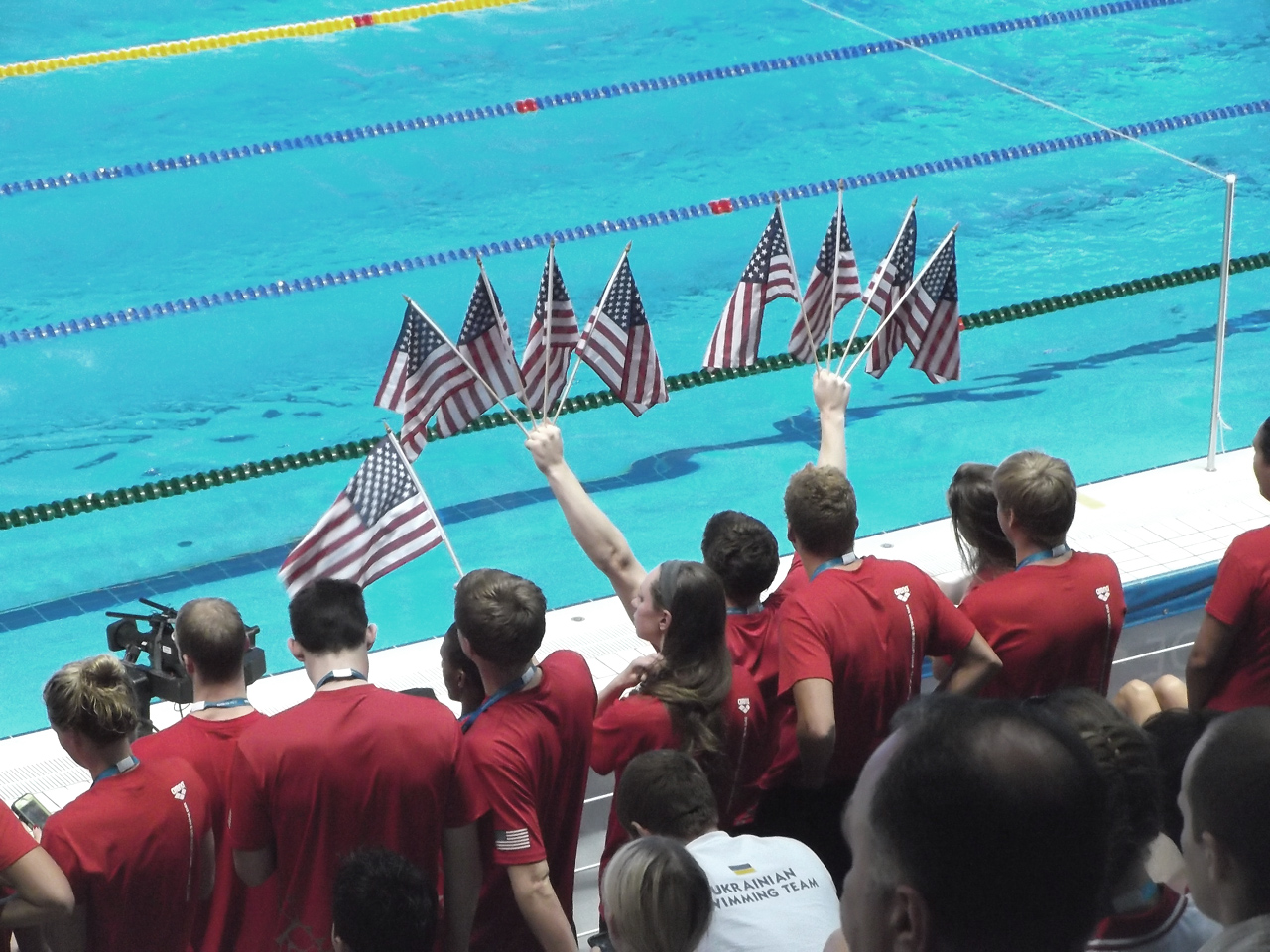
Fans of the US team at the Universiade

== Medalists ==
Medal	Name	Sport	Event	Date
Gold	Aurieyall Scott	Athletics	Women's 100 metres	July 8
Gold	Jeneva McCall	Athletics	Women's hammer throw	July 10
Gold	Vashti Thomas	Athletics	Women's 100 metres hurdles	July 10
Gold	Gavin Kendricks	Athletics	Men's pole vault	July 11
Gold	Sean Ryan	Swimming	Men's 1500 metre freestyle	July 12
Gold	Stephanie Peacock	Swimming	Women's 1500 metre freestyle	July 13
Gold	Megan Romano; Chelsea Chenault; Sarah Henry; Andrea Murez	Swimming	Women's 4 x 200 metre freestyle relay	July 13
Gold	United States women's national basketball team: Crystal Bradford; Aaryn Ellenberg; Reshanda Gray; Cassie Harberts; Bria Hartley; Jordan Hooper; Tricia Liston; Ariel Massengale; Kaleena Mosqueda-Lewis; Theresa Plaisance; Shoni Schimmel; Odyssey Sims	Basketball	Women's tournament	July 15
Gold	Jack Conger	Swimming	Men's 200 metre backstroke	July 15
Gold	Michael Weiss	Swimming	Men's 400 metre individual medley	July 16
Gold	Ashley Twichell	Swimming	Women's 10 kilometre marathon	July 17
Silver	Meghan Hawthorne	Swimming	Women's 400 metre individual medley	July 10
Silver	Megan Romano; Rachael Acker; Andrea Murez; Liv Jensen	Swimming	Women's 4 x 100 metre freestyle relay	July 10
Silver	Loren Figueroa; Meghan Houston; Sarah McCrady; Samantha Pickens; Laura Ryan; Mackenzie Tweardy; Katrina Young	Diving	Women's team	July 12
Silver	Michael Alexandrov	Swimming	Men's 100 metre breaststroke	July 11
Silver	Vashti Thomas; Aurieyall Scott; Jade Barber; Tristie Johnson	Athletics	Women's 4 x 100 metres relay	July 12
Silver	Ashley Steenvoorden	Swimming	Women's 1500 metre freestyle	July 13
Silver	Sarah Henry	Swimming	Women's 200 metre individual medley	July 13
Silver	Megan Romano	Swimming	Women's 100 metre backstroke	July 13
Silver	Brittney Roberts	wrestling	Women's freestyle 72 kg	July 13
Silver	Laura Sogar	Swimming	Women's 200 metre breaststroke	July 14
Silver	Allison Ragan	wrestling	Women's freestyle 59 kg	July 14
Silver	Matt Barber; Austin Surhoff; Michael Wynalda; Michael Weiss	Swimming	Men's 4 × 200 m freestyle relay	July 15
Silver	Stephanie Peacock	Swimming	Women's 800 metre freestyle	July 15
Silver	Sabrina Santamaria	Tennis	Women's singles	July 16
Bronze	Madison Crocker; Morgan Fuller; Leigh Haldeman; Megan Hansley; Mary Killman; Mariya Koroleva; Michelle Moore; Olivia Morgan; Rosilyn Tegart; Evelyna Wang; Khadija Zanotto	Synchronized swimming	Team	July 8
Bronze	Meghan Houston; Laura Ryan	Diving	Women's synchronized 3 metre springboard	July 11
Bronze	Jacob Pebley	Swimming	Men's 100 metre backstroke	July 11
Bronze	Tyrell Fortune	wrestling	Men's freestyle 120 kg	July 11
Bronze	Kendrick Farris	Weightlifting	Men's 94 kg	July 12
Bronze	David Taylor	wrestling	Men's freestyle 74 kg	July 12
Bronze	Megan Romano	Swimming	Women's 100 metre freestyle	July 12
Bronze	Laura Sogar	Swimming	Women's 100 metre breaststroke	July 12
Bronze	Melanie Margalis	Swimming	Women's 200 metre individual medley	July 13
Bronze	Jacob Pebley	Swimming	Men's 200 metre backstroke	July 15
Bronze	Ashley Steenvoorden	Swimming	Women's 800 metre freestyle	July 15
Bronze	Megan Romano	Swimming	Women's 50 metre freestyle	July 16
Bronze	Michael Wynalda; Kyler Van Swol; Michael Alexandrov; Jack Conger; Derek Toomey; Giles Smith; Cody Miller; Jacob Pebley	Swimming	Men's 4 x 100 metre medley relay	July 16
Bronze	Megan Romano; Kelsey Floyd; Laura Sogar; Andrea Murez; Cindy Tran; Emily McClellan; Kendyl Stewart	Swimming	Women's 4 x 100 metre medley relay	July 16
Bronze	Kaitlyn Christian; Sabrina Santamaria	Tennis	Women's team	July 16

== Athletics ==
The United States will be represented in athletics.

=== Men ===
Track & road events

Athlete	Event	Heat		Quarterfinal		Semifinal		Final	
Athlete	Event	Result	Rank	Result	Rank	Result	Rank	Result	Rank
Ahmed Ali	100 m	DNS	–	Did not advance					
Justin Austin	100 m	10.40	3 Q	10.42	4 q	10.59	7	Did not advance	
Justin Austin	200 m	DNS	–	Did not advance					

Field events

Athlete	Event	Qualification		Final	
Athlete	Event	Distance	Position	Distance	Position
Montez Blair	High jump	2.15	11 Q	2.10	14
Gavin Sam Kendricks	Pole vault	—N/a		5.60	1st place, gold medalist(s)
Mike Woepse	Pole vault	—N/a		5.30	9
Joe Kovacs	Shot put	18.65	8 Q	NM	–
Derrick Vicars	Shot put	18.28	10 Q	18.28	8
Derrick Vicars	Discus throw	55.00	13	Did not advance	

=== Women ===
Track & road events

Athlete	Event	Heat		Semifinal		Final	
Athlete	Event	Result	Rank	Result	Rank	Result	Rank
Aurieyall Scott	100 m	11.48	2 Q	11.38	1 Q	11.28	1st place, gold medalist(s)
Tristie Johnson	200 m	23.90	10 Q	23.47	5 q	23.32	5
Briana Nelson	400 m	53.35	4 Q	53.08	6	Did not advance	
Nicole Schappert	1500 m	4:17.15	6 q	—N/a			
Vashti Thomas	100 m hurdles	12.87	1 Q	—N/a		12.61 UR	1st place, gold medalist(s)
Jade Barber	100 m hurdles	13.46	9	Did not advance			
Landria Buckley	400 m hurdles	56.15	3 Q	—N/a		DNF	–
Vashti Mary Thomas; Aurieyall Scott; Jade Barber; Tristie Johnson	4 × 100 m relay	44.08	1 Q	—N/a		43.54	2nd place, silver medalist(s)

Field events

Athlete	Event	Qualification		Final	
Athlete	Event	Distance	Position	Distance	Position
Vashti Thomas	Long jump	6.26	6 Q	6.01	13
Jeneva McCall	Shot put	16.99	8 q	17.04	8
Felisha Johnson	Shot put	17.62	3 Q	17.47	7
Jeneva McCall	Hammer throw	—N/a		73.75	1st place, gold medalist(s)

== Badminton ==
The United States will be represented by two male and two female badminton players.

=== Men ===
Athlete	Event	Round of 128	Round of 64	Round of 32	Round of 16	Quarterfinals	Semifinals	Final	
Athlete	Event	Opposition Score	Opposition Score	Opposition Score	Opposition Score	Opposition Score	Opposition Score	Opposition Score	Rank
Randy Ma	Singles	Kaljumae (EST); L 18–21, 11–21	did not advance						
Randy Ma; Michael Buasan	Doubles		Takeuchi / Hoshino (JPN); L 15–21, 7–21	did not advance					

=== Women ===
Athlete	Event	Round of 64	Round of 32	Round of 16	Quarterfinals	Semifinals	Final	
Athlete	Event	Opposition Score	Opposition Score	Opposition Score	Opposition Score	Opposition Score	Opposition Score	Rank
Sharon Ng	Singles	Mazurtsak (EST); W 21–11, 21–11	Arieda (INA); L 9–21, 11–21	did not advance				
Sharon Ng; Danae Long	Doubles		Khlebko / Polikarpova (RUS); L 12–21, 12–21	did not advance				

=== Mixed ===
Athlete	Event	Round of 64	Round of 32	Round of 16	Quarterfinals	Semifinals	Final	
Athlete	Event	Opposition Score	Opposition Score	Opposition Score	Opposition Score	Opposition Score	Opposition Score	Rank
Michael Buasan; Danae Long	Mixed		Khlebko / Sozonov (RUS); L 3–21, 12–21	did not advance				

== Basketball ==
The United States has qualified both a men's and a women's team.

=== Men ===
The men's team will participate in Group C.

==== Team roster ====
The men's team roster is as follows:

United States Men's World University Games Team roster
Players
Coaches

Pos.	No.	Name	Age – Date of birth	Height	Club	Ctr.
G	8	Spencer Dinwiddie	20 – April 6, 1993	6 ft 6 in (1.98 m)	University of Colorado, Boulder	(United States)
G	4	Yogi Ferrell	20 – May 9, 1993	6 ft 0 in (1.83 m)	Indiana University	(United States)
F	10	Treveon Graham	19 – October 28, 1993	6 ft 5 in (1.96 m)	Virginia Commonwealth University	(United States)
F	7	Luke Hancock	23 – January 30, 1990	6 ft 6 in (1.98 m)	University of Louisville	(United States)
G	6	Tyler Haws	22 – April 11, 1991	6 ft 5 in (1.96 m)	Brigham Young University	(United States)
C	12	Cory Jefferson	22 – December 26, 1990	6 ft 9 in (2.06 m)	Baylor University	(United States)
G	9	Sean Kilpatrick	23 – January 6, 1990	6 ft 4 in (1.93 m)	University of Cincinnati	(United States)
C	15	Alex Kirk	21 – November 14, 1991	7 ft 0 in (2.13 m)	University of New Mexico	(United States)
F	11	Doug McDermott	21 – January 3, 1992	6 ft 8 in (2.03 m)	Creighton University	(United States)
F	14	Adreian Payne	22 – February 19, 1991	6 ft 10 in (2.08 m)	Michigan State University	(United States)
F	5	Will Sheehey	21 – January 16, 1992	6 ft 7 in (2.01 m)	Indiana University	(United States)
C	13	Aaron White	20 – September 10, 1992	6 ft 8 in (2.03 m)	University of Iowa	(United States)

Head coach

- (United States) Bob McKillop (Davidson College)

Assistant coach(es)

- (United States) John Beilein (University of Michigan)
- (United States) Frank Martin (University of South Carolina)

Team Physician

- (United States) Jeff Bytomski (Duke University)

Athletic Trainer

- (United States) Ray Beltz (Davidson College)

Legend

- (C) Team captain
- nat field describes country of university
- Age field is age on July 7, 2013

==== Preliminary round ====
Team	Pld	W	L	PF	PA	PD	Pts
Canada	5	5	0	494	336	+158	10
Australia	5	4	1	462	329	+133	9
United States	5	3	2	488	351	+137	8
Czech Republic	5	2	3	331	385	−54	7
Sweden	5	1	4	329	371	−42	6
United Arab Emirates	5	0	5	255	587	−332	5

7 July 2013
18:30

Report

United States	140–46	United Arab Emirates
Scoring by quarter: 35–16, 34–7, 31–11, 40–12
Pts: Kilpatrick 18; Rebs: Kirk 12; Asts: Ferrell 13		Pts: Zuwayed Khalifa 14; Rebs: Zuwayed Khalifa, Omar Alameri 4 Asts: Zuwayed Khalifa 2

Basket Hall
Referees: Dariusz Zapolski (POL), Timo Suslov (EST), Tien Hsiao-lun (TPE)

8 July 2013
13:00

Report

United States	96–53	Czech Republic
Scoring by quarter: 20–9, 21–13, 25–16, 30–15
Pts: McDermott 23; Rebs: Jefferson 15; Asts: Ferrell, Sheehey 4		Pts: Peterka 12; Rebs: Slavik 6 Asts: Sontar, Gniadek 2

Basket Hall
Referees: Timo Suslov (EST), Kihamu Matsumoto (JPN), Henri Hilke (FIN)

10 July 2013
21:00

Report

United States	83–65	Sweden
Scoring by quarter: 18–17, 19–10, 27–17, 19–21
Pts: Ferrell 20; Rebs: Jefferson 10; Asts: Dinwiddie 6		Pts: Czerapowicz 12; Rebs: Hampton 5 Asts: Joseph 5

Basket Hall
Attendance: 1500
Referees: Boris Schmidt (GER), Rodrigo Miguel Oliveros Henriquez (CHI), Tien Hsiao-lun (TPE)

11 July 2013
18:30

Report

United States	84–93	Australia
Scoring by quarter: 19–20, 24–20, 21–19, 20–34
Pts: McDermott 22; Rebs: Jefferson 11; Asts: Graham 5		Pts: Cadee 23; Rebs: Broekhoff 12; Asts: Bairstow 5

Basket Hall
Referees: Evgeny Vetrov (RUS), Jose Juan Ayala Perez (MEX), Ahmed Al-Bulushi (OMA)

12 July 2013
13:00

Report

Canada	94–85	United States
Scoring by quarter: 18–17, 28–19, 23–22, 25–27
Pts: Heslip 20; Rebs: Ejim, Mullings 7 Asts: Scrubb 5		Pts: Hancock 27; Rebs: McDermott 9 Asts: Dinwiddie 8

Basket Hall
Attendance: 1700
Referees: Sergey Mikhaylov (RUS), Yrjo Johannes Sarekoski (FIN), Karla Diniz (BRA)

==== Classification round ====
14 July 2013
10:00

Report

United States	91–51	Norway
Scoring by quarter: 17–15, 26–10, 21–15, 27–11
Pts: Sheehey 16; Rebs: Kirk 8 Asts: Dinwiddie 8		Pts: Nwachukwu 10; Rebs: Jawara 7 Asts: Jawara 3

Miras Sports Complex
Attendance: 360
Referees: Laszlo Lorand Bukuresti (ROU), Timo Suslov (EST), Hussain Albloushi (UAE)

15 July 2013
10:00

Report

Germany	70–92	United States
Scoring by quarter: 19–17, 13–29, 19–19, 19–27
Pts: Klein 16; Rebs: Wohlfarth-Bottermann, Voigtmann 7 Asts: Canty, Klein 3		Pts: McDermott 18; Rebs: Hancock, Jefferson 7 Asts: Dinwiddie 7

Miras Sports Complex
Attendance: 326
Referees: Vladimir Ohkrimenko (RUS), Mindaugas Vecherskis (LTU), Wu Zhiwei (HKG)

16 July 2013
15:00

Report

United States	97–70	Finland
Scoring by quarter: 25–20, 27–6, 20–18, 25–26
Pts: Sheehey 20; Rebs: White 10; Asts: Hancock 5		Pts: Lindbom 18; Rebs: Niemi 7 Asts: Nikkarinen 7

Basket Hall
Referees: Stanislav Kucera (CZE), Volodymyr Pediev (UKR), Shigeyuki Arisawa (JPN)

Final rank: 9

=== Women ===
The women's team will participate in Group B.

==== Team roster ====
The women's team roster is as follows:

United States Women's World University Games Team roster
Players
Coaches

Pos.	No.	Name	Age – Date of birth	Height	Club	Ctr.
G	9	Crystal Bradford	19 – November 1, 1993	6 ft 0 in (1.83 m)	Central Michigan University	(United States)
G	7	Aaryn Ellenberg	20 – July 17, 1992	5 ft 7 in (1.7 m)	University of Oklahoma	(United States)
F	12	Reshanda Gray	20 – June 1, 1993	6 ft 3 in (1.91 m)	University of California	(United States)
F	14	Cassie Harberts	21 – June 4, 1992	6 ft 2 in (1.88 m)	University of Southern California	(United States)
G	6	Bria Hartley	20 – September 30, 1992	5 ft 7 in (1.7 m)	University of Connecticut	(United States)
F	10	Jordan Hooper	21 – February 20, 1992	6 ft 2 in (1.88 m)	University of Nebraska–Lincoln	(United States)
G	13	Tricia Liston	21 – February 20, 1992	6 ft 1 in (1.85 m)	Duke University	(United States)
G	5	Ariel Massengale	20 – June 10, 1993	5 ft 6 in (1.68 m)	University of Tennessee	(United States)
F	11	Kaleena Mosqueda-Lewis	19 – November 3, 1993	6 ft 0 in (1.83 m)	University of Connecticut	(United States)
F	15	Theresa Plaisance	21 – May 18, 1992	6 ft 5 in (1.96 m)	Louisiana State University	(United States)
G	8	Shoni Schimmel	21 – May 4, 1992	5 ft 9 in (1.75 m)	University of Louisville	(United States)
G	4	Odyssey Sims	20 – July 13, 1992	5 ft 8 in (1.73 m)	Baylor University	(United States)

Head coach

- (United States) Sherri Coale (University of Oklahoma)

Assistant coach(es)

- (United States) Brian Giorgis (Marist College)
- (United States) Coquese Washington (Penn State University)

Athletic Trainer

- (United States) LouAnne Jefferson (Michigan State University)

Legend

- (C) Team captain
- nat field describes country of university
- Age field is age on July 7, 2013

==== Preliminary round ====
Team	Pld	W	L	PF	PA	PD	Pts
United States	3	3	0	326	168	+158	6
Czech Republic	3	2	1	206	208	−2	5
Brazil	3	1	2	216	242	−26	4
Mali	3	0	3	127	257	−130	3

8 July 2013
20:30

Report

United States	120–32	Mali
Scoring by quarter: 28–12, 29–8, 37–8, 26–4
Pts: Hartley 17; Rebs: Plaisance 11; Asts: Schimmel 9		Pts: Mariko 15; Rebs: Sissoko, Toure 4 Asts: Diallo, Toure 2

Olymp Sport Hall
Referees: Wang Zebo (CHN), Vladimir Okhrimenko (RUS), Karen Lasuik (CAN)

9 July 2013
20:30

Report

United States	101–61	Czech Republic
Scoring by quarter: 21–11, 27–16, 30–14, 23–20
Pts: Lewis 19; Rebs: Bradford, Hooper 7 Asts: Sims 6		Pts: Pochobradska 17; Rebs: Hanušová 8 Asts: Bartáková, Stara 3

Miras Sports Complex
Attendance: 127
Referees: Pal Attila Gyorffy (HUN), Yrjo Johannes Sarekoski (FIN), Kihamu Matsumoto (JPN)

10 July 2013
12:30

Report

United States	105–75	Brazil
Scoring by quarter: 36–16, 20–16, 26–19, 23–24
Pts: Ellenberg-Wiley 19; Rebs: Plaisance 7 Asts: Sims 10		Pts: Zabani 18; Rebs: Nascimento 7 Asts: Zabani 4

Miras Sports Complex
Attendance: 200
Referees: Wang Zebo (CHN), Laszlo Lorand Bukuresti (ROU), Hussain Albloushi (UAE)

==== Quarterfinals ====
12 July 2013
10:30

Report

United States	103–72	Sweden
Scoring by quarter: 26–24, 25–16, 24–16, 28–16
Pts: Sims 20; Rebs: Lewis 7 Asts: Massengale 4		Pts: Hamilton Carter 17; Rebs: Drammeh 9 Asts: Gultekin, Stalvant 3

Basket Hall
Attendance: 150
Referees: Ivana Ivanovic (SRB), Evgeny Vetrov (RUS), Karen Lasuik (CAN)

==== Semifinals ====
13 July 2013
21:00

Report

United States	79–78	Australia
Scoring by quarter: 13–20, 19–13, 30–16, 17–29
Pts: Sims 20; Rebs: Lewis 11; Asts: Hartley 5		Pts: Kunek 20; Rebs: Kunek 9 Asts: Madgen 6

Basket Hall
Attendance: 2500
Referees: Mindaugas Vecherskis (LTU), Karla Diniz (BRA), Rodrigo Miguel Oliveros Henriquez (CHI)

==== Gold Medal Game ====
15 July 2013
21:30

Report

United States	90–71	Russia
Scoring by quarter: 22–13, 19–14, 27–20, 22–24
Pts: Hartley 17; Rebs: Hooper 9 Asts: Massengale 5		Pts: Vieru 13; Rebs: Vieru 9 Asts: Logunova 4

Basket Hall
Attendance: 4,000
Referees: Ivana Ivanovic (SRB), Wang Zebo (CHN), Toni Caldwell (AUS)

Final rank: (gold)

== Beach volleyball ==
The United States will be represented by two men's teams and two women's teams.

=== Men ===
Athletes	Event	Preliminary round (3)	Elimination rounds					
Athletes	Event	Preliminary round (3)	Round 1	Round 2	Quarterfinals	Semifinals	Final	Standing
Athletes	Event	Opposition Score	Opposition Score	Opposition Score	Opposition Score	Opposition Score	Opposition Score	Standing
Tri Bourne; William Montgomery	Doubles	Group K Retterholt – Solhaug (NOR); W 2 – 0 (21–18, 21–16); Prokopyev – Bogotov (RUS); W 2 – 1 (15–21, 23–21, 15–11); Candido – da Silva (BRA); W 2 – 0 (21–11, 21–15)	—N/a	Gong – Li (CHN); W 2 – 1 (21–18, 18–21, 15–13)	Sangkhachot – Sukto (THA); L 0 – 2 (25–27, 14–21)	Did not advance		
Jeffrey Carlson; Connor Hughes	Doubles	Group J Kadziola – Szalankiewicz (POL); L 0 – 2 (17–21, 18–21); Cecchini – Morichelli (ITA); L 1 – 2 (24–22, 14–21, 11–15); Gogtepe – Gogtepe (TUR); L 1 – 2 (17–21, 21–19, 13–15)	Did not advance					

=== Women ===
Athletes	Event	Preliminary round	Elimination rounds					
Athletes	Event	Preliminary round	Round 1	Round 2	Quarterfinals	Semifinals	Final	Standing
Athletes	Event	Opposition Score	Opposition Score	Opposition Score	Opposition Score	Opposition Score	Opposition Score	Standing
Caitlin Ledoux; Stevi Robinson	Doubles	Group C Ceballos – Gonzaga (PHI); W 2 – 0 (21–13, 21–16); Kvapilova – Rehackova (CZE); L 0 – 2 (19–21, 15–21)	Jirak – Pleisiutschnig (AUT); L 1 – 2 (21–12, 14–21, 14–16)	Did not advance				
Emily Stockman; Lane Carico	Doubles	Group G Popova – Prokopeva (RUS); W 2 – 1 (24–22, 22–24, 15–11); Pedersen – Solvoll (NOR); W 2 – 0 (21–13, 21–15) da Silva – Silva (BRA); W 2 – 0 (21–3, 21–5)	Bye	Jirak – Pleisiutschnig (AUT); W 2 – 0 (21–18, 21–8)	Laboureur – Sude (GER); L 0 – 2 (18–21, 19–21)	Did not advance		

== Diving ==
The United States will be represented by twelve divers from ten universities.

=== Men ===
Athlete	Event	Preliminaries		Semifinals		Final	
Athlete	Event	Points	Rank	Points	Rank	Points	Rank
Sam Dorman	1 m springboard	328.30	12	366.45	5	Did not advance	
Harrison Jones	1 m springboard	369.25	8	405.50	2	363.85	8
Zac Nees	1 m springboard	223.95	24	Did not advance			
Sam Dorman	3 m springboard	328.75	21	Did not advance			
Zac Nees	3 m springboard	322.80	23	Did not advance			
Sam Dorman; Zac Nees	Synchronized 3 m springboard	—N/a				390.06	4
Casey Johnson; Conor Murphy	Synchronized 10 m platform	—N/a				334.08	6
Harrison Jones; Sam Dorman; Zac Nees; Casey Johnson; Conor Murphy	Team ranking	—N/a				2673.34	5

=== Women ===
Athlete	Event	Preliminaries		Semifinals		Final	
Athlete	Event	Points	Rank	Points	Rank	Points	Rank
Loren Figueroa	1 m springboard	247.20	8	Did not advance			
Samantha Pickens	1 m springboard	249.85	6	267.15	2	263.90	5
Samantha Pickens	3 m springboard	276.25	6 Q	277.45	6 Q	227.70	9
Laura Ryan	3 m springboard	268.35	7 Q	257.45	8 Q	223.75	10
Katrina Young	10 m platform	253.30	11	268.25	10	289.25	6
Laura Ryan	10 m platform	230.15	12	244.40	11	292.00	5
Meghan Houston; Laura Ryan	Synchronized 3 metre springboard	—N/a				270.00	3rd place, bronze medalist(s)
Sarah McCrady; Mackenzie Tweardy	Synchronized 10 metre platform	—N/a				266.16	4
Loren Figueroa; Meghan Houston; Sarah McCrady; Samantha Pickens; Laura Ryan; Mackenzie Tweardy; Katrina Young	Team	—N/a				2109.91	2nd place, silver medalist(s)

== Fencing ==
The United States was represented in fencing.

=== Men ===
Athlete	Event	Round of 128	Round of 64	Round of 32	Round of 16	Quarterfinal	Semifinal	Final / BM	
Athlete	Event	Opposition Score	Opposition Score	Opposition Score	Opposition Score	Opposition Score	Opposition Score	Opposition Score	Rank
Alen Hadzic	Individual épée	Bye	Alimzhanov (KAZ); W 15–11	Freilich (ISR); W 15–14	Priinits (EST); L 0–2	Did not advance			
Johnathan Yergler	Individual épée	Bye	Sukhov (RUS); L 6–15	Did not advance					
Narayan Pathi	Individual épée	Shorey (CAN); L 14–15	Did not advance						
Adrian Bak	Individual sabre	Bye	Darmiento (ITA); L 14–15	Did not advance					
Kaito Streets	Individual sabre	Bye	Kindler (GER); L 9–15	Did not advance					
Thomas Kolasa	Individual sabre	Bye	Olejnik (POL); L 12–15	Did not advance					
Joseph Nobuo Bravo	Individual foil	—N/a	Kitagawa (JPN); L 7–15	Did not advance					
Max Blitzer	Individual foil	—N/a	Onizawa (JPN); L 13–15	Did not advance					
Michael Woo	Individual foil	—N/a	Mepstead (GBR); L 11–15	Did not advance					

=== Women ===
Athlete	Event	Round of 64	Round of 32	Round of 16	Quarterfinal	Semifinal	Final / BM	
Athlete	Event	Opposition Score	Opposition Score	Opposition Score	Opposition Score	Opposition Score	Opposition Score	Rank
Ashley-Marie Severson	Individual épée	Pochkalova (UKR); L 9–15	Did not advance					
Katharine Holmes	Individual épée	Mosler (POL); L 11–15	Did not advance					
Francesca Alexandra Bassa	Individual épée	Fautsch (LUX); W 15–11	Choi (KOR); L 14–15	Did not advance				
Anne-Elizabeth Stone	Individual sabre	Pridhodko (KAZ); W 15–11	Kim (KOR); L 10–15	Did not advance				
Kamali Thompson	Individual sabre	Liu (CHN); L 9–15	Did not advance					
Mary-Grace Stone	Individual sabre	Bye	Gulotta (ITA); L 6–15	Did not advance				
Nicole Glon	Individual sabre	Bye	Galiakbarova (RUS); L 0–15	Did not advance				
Luona Wang	Individual foil	—N/a	Volpi (ITA); L 4–15	Did not advance				
Madison Zeiss	Individual foil	—N/a	Kawamura (JPN); W 15–9	Volpi (ITA); L 10–15	Did not advance			
Olivia Dobbs	Individual foil	—N/a	Groslambert (BEL); L 12–15	Did not advance				

== Judo ==
The United States will be represented by three judoka.

=== Men ===
Athlete	Event	Round of 64	Round of 32	Round of 16	Quarterfinals	Semifinals	Final	
Athlete	Event	Opposition Result	Opposition Result	Opposition Result	Opposition Result	Opposition Result	Opposition Result	Rank
Nathan Kearney	Featherweight		Lundqvist (SWE); W 100–000	Dashdavaa (MGL); L 000–110	Did not advance			
Michael Harrison	Welterweight	Mehdiyev (AZE); L 000–100	Did not advance					

Repechage rounds

Athlete	Event	First repechage round	Second repechage round	Repechage quarterfinals	Repechage semifinals	Bronze final
Athlete	Event	Opposition Result	Opposition Result	Opposition Result	Opposition Result	Opposition Result
Michael Harrison	Welterweight	Tomas Costas (POR); L 000–1021	Did not advance			

*Nick Delpopolo was due to compete, but withdrew from the tournament due to illness.

== Rowing ==
The United States will be represented by an eight crew.

=== Men ===
Athlete	Event	Heats		Final	
Athlete	Event	Time	Rank	Time	Rank
Christopher Leonard (cox); Kasey Charles Colander; Jeffrey Latham; Luke Wilhelm; James Letten; Luke Yehlen; Keane Johnson; Zachary Petronic; Ian Luetzow	Eight	6:33.81	4	Placed 6th	

== Rugby sevens ==
The United States will be represented by a women's team.

=== Women ===
The women's team will participate in Group B.

==== Team roster ====
The team roster is as follows:

Name	Position	Club
Sadie Anderson	Scrum Half/Fly Half	Penn State University
Ryan Carlyle	Hooker/Center	University of South Carolina
Nicole Castro	Wing	US Naval Academy
Tayler Davidson	Prop	US Naval Academy
Juliann Hitt	Wing/Hooker/Scrum Half	US Naval Academy
Karissa Kleinschmidt	Hooker/Scrum Half	US Naval Academy
Phoebe Kotlikoff	Prop	US Naval Academy
Kacey Liscomb	Center	US Naval Academy
Erika Pedersen	Prop	US Naval Academy
Lauren Rhode	Fly Half	Princeton University
Riacca Slater	Wing/Scrum Half	US Naval Academy
Katherine Smith	Prop	US Naval Academy
Sierra Snapp	Wing	US Naval Academy

Head coach: Sue Parker
Assistant coach: Jenny Hansen
Team manager: Julie Hogan
Athletic trainer: Meghan Chambers

==== Preliminary round ====
Team	GP	W	D	L	PF	PA	PD	Pts
Great Britain	4	4	0	0	115	39	+76	12
China	4	2	0	2	64	67	−3	8
Italy	4	1	1	2	67	67	0	7
Brazil	4	1	1	2	44	78	−34	7
United States	4	1	0	3	32	71	−39	6

14 July 2013
10:06

Brazil	12–5	United States
	Report

Tulpar Stadium

14 July 2013
14:30

Italy	14–17	United States
	Report

Tulpar Stadium

15 July 2013
11:06

United States	0–24	China
	Report

Tulpar Stadium

15 July 2013
13:40

Great Britain	21–10	United States
	Report

Tulpar Stadium

==== Classification round ====
16 July 2013
14:44

Japan	10–5	United States
	Report

Tulpar Stadium

Final rank: 10

== Sambo ==
The United States will be represented by one practitioner.

=== Men ===
Athlete	Event	Round of 16	Quarterfinals	Semifinals	Repechage 1	Repechage 2	Final / BM	
Athlete	Event	Opposition Result	Opposition Result	Opposition Result	Opposition Result	Opposition Result	Opposition Result	Rank
Arash Valizadeh Soofiani	+100 kg	Kuchumov (RUS); L 0–8	Did not advance		Jeon (KOR); L 1–3	Did not advance		

== Shooting ==
The United States will be represented in the shooting competitions. Over half of the pistol team and the coach of the pistol team will be from the United States Military Academy.

=== Men ===
Athlete	Event	Qualification		Final	
Athlete	Event	Points	Rank	Points	Rank
Matthew Pueppke	10 metre air pistol	550	34	Did not advance	
Timothy Steinberg	10 metre air pistol	539	37	Did not advance	
Stephen Bowden	10 metre air pistol	561	23	Did not advance	
Stephen Bowden; Matthew Pueppke; Timothy Steinberg	Team 10 metre air pistol	—N/a		1650	8
Joseph Totts	25 metre standard pistol	283	13	Did not advance	
Michael Cheney	25 metre standard pistol	257	24	Did not advance	
Shane Greene	25 metre standard pistol	259	23	Did not advance	
Joseph Totts	25 metre rapid fire pistol	557	17	Did not advance	
Michael Cheney	25 metre rapid fire pistol	494	25	Did not advance	
Shane Greene	25 metre rapid fire pistol	523	21	Did not advance	
Joseph Totts; Shane Greene; Michael Cheney	Team 25 metre rapid fire pistol	—N/a		1574	5
Matthew Pueppke	50 metre pistol	520	24	Did not advance	
Stephen Bowden	50 metre pistol	509	26	Did not advance	
Timothy Steinberg	50 metre pistol	514	25	Did not advance	
Joseph Totts; Shane Greene; Michael Cheney	Team 50 metre pistol	—N/a		1543	7

=== Women ===
Athlete	Event	Qualification		Semifinal		Final	
Athlete	Event	Points	Rank	Points	Rank	Points	Rank
Courtney Anthony	10 metre air pistol	—N/a		379	9	Did not advance	
Heather Deppe	10 metre air pistol	361	51	—N/a		Did not advance	
Melody Yap	10 metre air pistol	366	46	—N/a		Did not advance	
Courtney Anthony; Melody Yap; Heather Deppe	Team 10 metre air pistol	—N/a				1106	11
Victoria Joye	25 metre pistol	511	42	Did not advance			
Courtney Anthony	25 metre pistol	531	38	Did not advance			
Heather Deppe	25 metre pistol	559	26	Did not advance			
Heather Deppe; Courtney Anthony; Victoria Joye	Team 25 metre pistol	—N/a				1601	10

== Swimming ==
The United States will be represented by a team of swimmers from colleges across the nation.

=== Men ===
Athlete	Event	Heat		Semifinal		Final	
Athlete	Event	Time	Rank	Time	Rank	Time	Rank
Adam Small	50 m freestyle	22.79	2 Q	22.61	4 Q	22.45	7
Derek Toomey	50 m freestyle	22.43	2 Q	22.45	3 Q	22.37	5
Tyler Reed	100 m freestyle	50.10	5 Q	49.87	7	Did not advance	
Michael Wynalda	100 m freestyle	49.87	2 Q	49.57	4 Q	49.93	7
Matt Barber	200 m freestyle	1:50.47	5 Q	1:50.29	7	Did not advance	
Michael Wynalda	200 m freestyle	1:48.59	2 Q	1:47.59	2 Q	1:47.65	4
Alex Wold	400 m freestyle	3:52.76	3 Q	—N/a		3:51.68	5
Jacob Ritter	400 m freestyle	3:52.50	2 Q	—N/a		3:53.68	7
Ryan Feeley	800 m freestyle	8:00.92	1 Q	—N/a		8:04.04	7
Sean Ryan	800 m freestyle	7:58.41	2 Q	—N/a		7:55.67	4
Ryan Feeley	1500 m freestyle	15:17.53	1 Q	—N/a		15:20.75	6
Sean Ryan	1500 m freestyle	15:11.43	1 Q	—N/a		14:57.33	1st place, gold medalist(s)
James Wells	50 m backstroke	25.94	5 Q	25.80	7	Did not advance	
Jacob Pebley	50 m backstroke	25.80	1 Q	25.85	8	Did not advance	
James Wells	100 m backstroke	55.83	5 Q	55.32	7	Did not advance	
Jacob Pebley	100 m backstroke	54.32	1 Q	54.14	1 Q	54.11	3rd place, bronze medalist(s)
Jack Conger	200 m backstroke	1:58.87	1 Q	1:57.82	1 Q	1:55.47	1st place, gold medalist(s)
Jacob Pebley	200 m backstroke	1:59.72	1 Q	1:58.71	3 Q	1:57.43	3rd place, bronze medalist(s)
Michael Alexandrov	50 m breaststroke	27.91	1 Q	27.94	4 Q	27.84	T4
Cody Miller	50 m breaststroke	28.58	3	Did not advance			
Michael Alexandrov	100 m breaststroke	1:00.76	1 Q	1:00.57	1 Q	1:00.30	2nd place, silver medalist(s)
Cody Miller	100 m breaststroke	1:01.77	4 Q	1:01.22	4 Q	1:01.17	7
Michael Alexandrov	200 m breaststroke	2:12.62	2 Q	2:12.89	3 Q	2:12.79	8
Cody Miller	200 m breaststroke	2:15.10	4 Q	2:12.11	2 Q	2:12.10	7
Jack Conger	50 m butterfly	24.19	3 Q	24.16	5	Did not advance	
Kyler Van Swol	50 m butterfly	24.30	1 Q	24.21	7	Did not advance	
Jack Conger	100 m butterfly	52.94	3 Q	52.51	2 Q	52.61	6
Kyler Van Swol	100 m butterfly	52.37	1 Q	52.80	4	Did not advance	
Michael Flach	200 m butterfly	1:58.94	1 Q	1:58.77	2 Q	1:58.90	6
Kyle Whitaker	200 m butterfly	2:00.62	5 Q	1:59.15	5 Q	2:00.49	8
Adam Hinshaw	200 m individual medley	2:02.27	2 Q	2:02.52	5	Did not advance	
Kyle Whitaker	200 m individual medley	1:59.53	1 Q	2:00.03	2 Q	2:00.42	4
Adam Hinshaw	400 m individual medley	4:21.64	3 Q	—N/a		4:20.60	7
Michael Weiss	400 m individual medley	4:20.78	1 Q	—N/a		4:12.00 UR	1st place, gold medalist(s)
Tyler Reed; Giles Smith; Derek Toomey; Michael Wynalda	4 × 100 m freestyle relay	3:17.42	1 Q	—N/a		3:17.60	4
Matt Barber; Austin Surhoff; Michael Wynalda; Michael Weiss	4 × 200 m freestyle relay	7:19.92	2 Q	—N/a		7:13.58	2nd place, silver medalist(s)
Michael Wynalda; Kyler Van Swol; Michael Alexandrov; Jack Conger; Derek Toomey; Giles Smith; Cody Miller; Jacob Pebley	4 × 100 m medley relay	3:38.03	1 Q	—N/a		3:34.63	3rd place, bronze medalist(s)
Ryan Feeley	10 km marathon	—N/a				1:57:41.9	10
Joey Pedraza	10 km marathon	—N/a				1:58:14.4	14

=== Women ===
Athlete	Event	Heat		Semifinal		Final	
Athlete	Event	Time	Rank	Time	Rank	Time	Rank
Liv Jensen	50 m freestyle	25.82	6 Q	25.66	6	Did not advance	
Megan Romano	50 m freestyle	25.20	1 Q	25.13	1 Q	24.98	3rd place, bronze medalist(s)
Liv Jensen	100 m freestyle	56.32	5 Q	56.87	8	Did not advance	
Megan Romano	100 m freestyle	55.48	1 Q	54.68	2 Q	54.45	3rd place, bronze medalist(s)
Chelsea Chenault	200 m freestyle	2:01.56	2 Q	1:59.46	3 Q	1:59.24	6
Megan Romano	200 m freestyle	2:02.34	4 Q	2:00.45	4 Q	2:00.67	7
Chelsea Chenault	400 m freestyle	4:14.04	2	Did not advance			
Stephanie Peacock	400 m freestyle	4:12.21	3 Q	—N/a		4:11.42	7
Stephanie Peacock	800 m freestyle	8:39.97	2 Q	—N/a		8:28.21	2nd place, silver medalist(s)
Ashley Steenvoorden	800 m freestyle	8:39.94	1 Q	—N/a		8:29.79	3rd place, bronze medalist(s)
Stephanie Peacock	1500 m freestyle	16:23.37	1 Q	—N/a		16:04.44 UR	1st place, gold medalist(s)
Ashley Steenvoorden	1500 m freestyle	16:28.94	2 Q	—N/a		16:07.89	2nd place, silver medalist(s)
Kendyl Stewart	50 m backstroke	29.26	1 Q	29.58	8	Did not advance	
Cindy Tran	50 m backstroke	28.59	1 Q	28.72	2 Q	28.45	4
Megan Romano	100 m backstroke	1:01.78	1 Q	1:01.22	4 Q	59.85	2nd place, silver medalist(s)
Cindy Tran	100 m backstroke	1:00.89	2 Q	1:01.85	3 Q	1:01.32	5
Kendyl Stewart	200 m backstroke	2:12.62	2 Q	2:11.85	2 Q	2:12.19	7
Ellen Williamson	200 m backstroke	2:11.71	1 Q	2:12.10	3 Q	2:13.28	8
Emily McClellan	50 m breaststroke	32.43	4 Q	31.87	4 Q	31.64	7
Laura Sogar	50 m breaststroke	32.07	2 Q	31.69	4 Q	31.76	8
Emily McClellan	100 m breaststroke	1:08.88	3 Q	1:09.31	5	Did not advance	
Laura Sogar	100 m breaststroke	1:08.74	1 Q	1:07.78	2 Q	1:07.78	3rd place, bronze medalist(s)
Andrea Kropp	200 m breaststroke	2:27.86	1 Q	2:27.35	3 Q	2:29.29	8
Laura Sogar	200 m breaststroke	2:26.17	1 Q	2:27.19	2 Q	2:25.33	2nd place, silver medalist(s)
Kelsey Floyd	50 m butterfly	26.82	1 Q	26.83	5	Did not advance	
Jasmine Tosky	50 m butterfly	27.46	2 Q	27.39	8	Did not advance	
Kelsey Floyd	100 m butterfly	1:00.19	1 Q	59.89	4 Q	1:00.43	8
Jasmine Tosky	100 m butterfly	1:00.35	2 Q	1:00.25	6	Did not advance	
Kelsey Floyd	200 m butterfly	2:16.37	4 Q	2:18.39	6	Did not advance	
Jasmine Tosky	200 m butterfly	2:12.24	1 Q	DNS	–	–	–
Sarah Henry	200 m individual medley	2:15.56	2 Q	2:14.01	3 Q	2:12.69	2nd place, silver medalist(s)
Melanie Margalis	200 m individual medley	2:13.62	1 Q	2:13.32	2 Q	2:12.96	3rd place, bronze medalist(s)
Meghan Hawthorne	400 m individual medley	—N/a				4:40.40	2nd place, silver medalist(s)
Sarah Henry	400 m individual medley	—N/a				4:46.02	7
Megan Romano; Rachael Acker; Andrea Murez; Liv Jensen	4 × 100 m freestyle relay	3:40.38	2 Q	—N/a		3:38.60	2nd place, silver medalist(s)
Megan Romano; Chelsea Chenault; Sarah Henry; Andrea Murez	4 × 200 m freestyle relay	8:00.74	1 Q	—N/a		7:55.53	1st place, gold medalist(s)
Megan Romano; Kelsey Floyd; Laura Sogar; Andrea Murez; Cindy Tran; Emily McClellan; Kendyl Stewart	4 × 200 m freestyle relay	4:06.51	2 Q	—N/a		4:02.71	3rd place, bronze medalist(s)
Emily Brunemann	10 km marathon	—N/a				2:05:32.8	4
Ashley Twichell	10 km marathon	—N/a				2:05:00.9	1st place, gold medalist(s)

== Synchronized swimming ==
The United States will be represented by eleven synchronized swimmers, most of whom are from Stanford University, the national collegiate champions of synchronized swimming.

Athlete	Event	Technical routine		Free routine (final)		
Athlete	Event	Points	Rank	Points	Total (technical + free)	Rank
Mary Killman	Solo	87.300	4	87.710	175.010	4
Olivia Morgan; Rosilyn Tegart; Megan Hansley	Duet	85.600	4	85.560	171.160	4
Madison Crocker; Morgan Fuller; Leigh Haldeman; Megan Hansley; Mary Killman; Mariya Koroleva; Michelle Moore; Olivia Morgan; Rosilyn Tegart; Evelyna Wang; Khadija Zanotto	Team	42.920	3	43.420	86.340	3rd place, bronze medalist(s)

== Tennis ==
The United States will be represented by the University of Southern California tennis team, which will consist of four male and four female tennis players.

=== Men ===
Athlete	Event	Round of 128	Round of 64	Round of 32	Round of 16	Quarterfinals	Semifinals	Final	
Athlete	Event	Opposition Score	Opposition Score	Opposition Score	Opposition Score	Opposition Score	Opposition Score	Opposition Score	Rank
Ray Sarmiento	Singles		Taifour (JOR); W 6–0, 6–0	Juneau (CAN); W 6–3, 6–1	Baluda (RUS); W 6–3, 6–2	Rakotondramanga (MAD); L 3–6, 6–7^{(4–7)}	did not advance		
Eric Johnson	Singles		Whitbread (GBR); W 6–4, 6–4	Katayama (JPN); L 4–6, 2–6	did not advance				
Robbie Bellamy; Ray Sarmiento	Doubles			Chitemamwise / Mufunda (ZIM); W 6–0, 6–0	Karaki / Zougheib (LIB); W 6–1, 6–1	Lee / Peng (TPE); L 2–6, 2–6	did not advance		
Robbie Bellamy; Ray Sarmiento	Team ranking	—N/a							9

Consolation Draw

Athlete	Event	Round of 32	Round of 16	Quarterfinals	Semifinals	Final	
Athlete	Event	Opposition Score	Opposition Score	Opposition Score	Opposition Score	Opposition Score	Rank
Robbie Bellamy	Singles	Said (MAS); L 2–6, 2–6	did not advance				
Johnny Wang	Singles		Al-Marri (QAT); W 6–0, 6–1	Hoang (FRA); W 6–3, 6–1	Anderson (CAN); W 6–2, 6–3	Tagawa (JPN); L 2–6, 4–6	2

=== Women ===
Athlete	Event	Round of 128	Round of 64	Round of 32	Round of 16	Quarterfinals	Semifinals	Final	
Athlete	Event	Opposition Score	Opposition Score	Opposition Score	Opposition Score	Opposition Score	Opposition Score	Opposition Score	Rank
Gabi Desimone	Singles		Korolova (LAT); W 6–1, 6–0	Luangnam (THA); L 2–6, 4–6	did not advance				
Sabrina Santamaria	Singles	Chiaparini (BRA); W 6–1, 6–0	Kumkhum (THA); W 7–5, 7–5	Borthwick (GBR); W 6–0, 6–2	Hsu (TPE); W 3–6, 6–1, 6–4	Siegemund (GER); W 7–6^{(7–2)}, 6–2	Kuwata (JPN); W 6–2, 6–2	Ishizu (JPN); L 2–6, 5–7	2nd place, silver medalist(s)
Kaitlyn Christian; Sabrina Santamaria	Doubles			Han / Yu (KOR); W 6–2, 6–4	Chiaparini / Chiaparini (BRA); W 6–0, 6–1	Pavlyuchenkova / Vesnina (RUS); L 4–6, 3–6	did not advance		
Kaitlyn Christian; Sabrina Santamaria	Team ranking	—N/a							3rd place, bronze medalist(s)

Consolation Draw

Athlete	Event	Round of 32	Round of 16	Quarterfinals	Semifinals	Final	
Athlete	Event	Opposition Score	Opposition Score	Opposition Score	Opposition Score	Opposition Score	Rank
Ellie Yates	Singles		Meng (CHN); W 6–1, 6–2	Harmath (CAN); L 2–6, 2–6	did not advance		
Kaitlyn Christian	Singles	Sanjevic (CAN); L 2–6, 2–6	did not advance				

=== Mixed ===
Athlete	Event	Round of 32	Round of 16	Quarterfinals	Semifinals	Final	
Athlete	Event	Opposition Score	Opposition Score	Opposition Score	Opposition Score	Opposition Score	Rank
Johnny Wang; Ellie Yates	Doubles	Chitemamwise / Nyakudzuka (ZIM); W 6–0, 6–0	Lee / Lee (TPE); L 1–6, 2–6	did not advance			

== Volleyball ==
The United States has qualified both a men's and a women's team.

=== Men ===
The men's team will participate in Group A.

==== Team roster ====
In the men's tournament, the United States will be represented by the Springfield College of Massachusetts volleyball team. The roster is listed as follows:

Abbreviations
№	Jersey number
Pos.	Position
L	Libero
OH	Outside hitter
RS	Right-side (opposite) hitter
S	Setter
MB	Middle blocker

№	Name	Pos.	Height	Year
3	Mike Pelletier	OH	6 ft 5 in (1.96 m)	Senior
5	Luis Vega	OH	6 ft 0 in (1.83 m)	Freshman
8	Jason Mascoe	MB	6 ft 2 in (1.88 m)	Sophomore
9	Ryan Lilley	L	5 ft 11 in (1.80 m)	Junior
12	Keaton Pieper	S	6 ft 4 in (1.93 m)	Sophomore
14	Greg Falcone	MB	6 ft 8 in (2.03 m)	Senior
15	Ryan Quesenberry	RS	6 ft 5 in (1.96 m)	Sophomore
16	Eric Johnson	S	6 ft 3 in (1.91 m)	Freshman
17	Jimmy O'Leary	MB	6 ft 6 in (1.98 m)	Junior
18	Nick Ferry	L	6 ft 0 in (1.83 m)	Junior
19	Greg Woods	OH	6 ft 1 in (1.85 m)	Freshman
20	Eric Brawn	RS	6 ft 3 in (1.91 m)	Freshman

Head coach: Charlie Sullivan
Assistant coaches: Kevin Burch, Tyler Wingate, Sam Zapatka

==== Preliminary round ====
Pos	Team	Pld	W	L	Pts	SW	SL	SR	SPW	SPL	SPR	Qualification
1	Russia	5	5	0	14	15	2	7.500	407	304	1.339	Quarterfinals
2	South Korea	5	4	1	12	12	4	3.000	382	332	1.151	Quarterfinals
3	Belarus	5	3	2	10	12	6	2.000	406	361	1.125	9th–16th place
4	Estonia	5	2	3	6	6	9	0.667	336	340	0.988	9th–16th place
5	Hong Kong	5	1	4	3	3	13	0.231	310	391	0.793	17th–21st place
6	United States	5	0	5	0	1	15	0.067	289	402	0.719	17th–21st place

6 July 2013; 12:00	United States	0–3	Estonia	Saint Petersburg Volleyball Center; Attendance: 2400
6 July 2013; 12:00	(22–25, 17–25, 18–25); Report			Saint Petersburg Volleyball Center; Attendance: 2400

7 July 2013; 18:00	Belarus	3–0	United States	Saint Petersburg Volleyball Center; Attendance: 800; Referees: Wichai Wannatawee (THA), Takeshi Tsukamoto (JPN)
7 July 2013; 18:00	(25–18, 25–15, 25–20); Report			Saint Petersburg Volleyball Center; Attendance: 800; Referees: Wichai Wannatawee (THA), Takeshi Tsukamoto (JPN)

8 July 2013; 20:00	United States	0–3	Russia	Saint Petersburg Volleyball Center; Attendance: 1800; Referees: Takeshi Tsukamoto (JPN), Wang Jun (CHN)
8 July 2013; 20:00	(13–25, 18–25, 9–25); Report			Saint Petersburg Volleyball Center; Attendance: 1800; Referees: Takeshi Tsukamoto (JPN), Wang Jun (CHN)

10 July 2013; 15:00	Hong Kong	3–1	United States	Olympiets Sport Complex; Attendance: 180; Referees: Jaromir Antusak, Aleksandr Sikanjic (SUI)
10 July 2013; 15:00	(25–18, 27–29, 25–23, 25–20); Report			Olympiets Sport Complex; Attendance: 180; Referees: Jaromir Antusak, Aleksandr Sikanjic (SUI)

11 July 2013; 15:00	United States	0–3	South Korea	Saint Petersburg Volleyball Center; Attendance: 600; Referees: Aleksandr Sikanjic (SUI), Paulo Picanco (BRA)
11 July 2013; 15:00	(13–25, 14–25, 22–25); Report			Saint Petersburg Volleyball Center; Attendance: 600; Referees: Aleksandr Sikanjic (SUI), Paulo Picanco (BRA)

==== Classification round ====
13 July 2013; 15:00	China	3–1	United States	Olympiets Sport Complex; Attendance: 300; Referees: Alexander Ryabtsov (RUS), Salem Abu Baker Alnoaman (UAE)
13 July 2013; 15:00	(25–14, 25–19, 23–25, 25–21); Report			Olympiets Sport Complex; Attendance: 300; Referees: Alexander Ryabtsov (RUS), Salem Abu Baker Alnoaman (UAE)

14 July 2013; 13:00	Macau	1–3	United States	Olympiets Sport Complex; Attendance: 400; Referees: Paulo Picanco (BRA), Maxim Berdnikov (RUS)
14 July 2013; 13:00	(24–26, 21–25, 25–17, 20–25); Report			Olympiets Sport Complex; Attendance: 400; Referees: Paulo Picanco (BRA), Maxim Berdnikov (RUS)

Final rank: 19

=== Women ===
The women's team will participate in Group A.

==== Team roster ====
In the women's tournament, the United States will be represented by the Kansas State University volleyball team. The roster is listed as follows:

Abbreviations
№	Jersey number
Pos.	Position
DS/L	Defense/libero
OH	Outside hitter
OP	Opposite hitter
S	Setter
MB	Middle blocker

№	Name	Pos.	Height	Year
2	Gina Madonia	DS/L	5 ft 7 in (1.70 m)	Junior
3	Chelsea Keating	OH	6 ft 1 in (1.85 m)	Junior
4	Tristan McCarty	DS/L	5 ft 9 in (1.75 m)	Senior
5	Bailey Shurbet	S	5 ft 9 in (1.75 m)	Freshman
6	Katie Brand	S	6 ft 0 in (1.83 m)	Sophomore
7	Courtney Cook	OH	6 ft 0 in (1.83 m)	Senior
9	Katie Reininger	MB	6 ft 1 in (1.85 m)	Sophomore
14	Taylor Johnson	MB	6 ft 0 in (1.83 m)	Junior
15	Brookelyn Langhaim	OP	6 ft 2 in (1.88 m)	Freshman
16	Dakota Kaufman	OH	6 ft 1 in (1.85 m)	Senior
17	Kaitlynn Pelger	MB	6 ft 2 in (1.88 m)	Senior
18	Courtney Traxson	OH	6 ft 1 in (1.85 m)	Senior

Head coach: Suzie Fritz
Associate head coach: Jeff Grove
Assistant coach: Jeff Hulsmeyer

==== Preliminary round ====
Pos	Team	Pld	W	L	Pts	SW	SL	SR	SPW	SPL	SPR	Qualification
1	Russia	3	3	0	9	9	0	MAX	225	154	1.461	Quarterfinals
2	Poland	3	2	1	6	6	3	2.000	196	187	1.048	Quarterfinals
3	Czech Republic	3	1	2	3	3	6	0.500	188	203	0.926	9th–15th place
4	United States	3	0	3	0	0	9	0.000	162	227	0.714	9th–15th place

8 July 2013; 20:00	Poland	3–0	United States	Zilant Sport Complex; Attendance: 60; Referees: Yoko Sanmi (JPN), Salem Abu Baker Alnoaman (UAE)
8 July 2013; 20:00	(25–17, 25–14, 25–20); Report			Zilant Sport Complex; Attendance: 60; Referees: Yoko Sanmi (JPN), Salem Abu Baker Alnoaman (UAE)

9 July 2013; 20:00	Czech Republic	3–0	United States	Saint Petersburg Volleyball Center; Attendance: 900; Referees: Salem Abu Baker Alnoaman (UAE), Chung Shu-fang (TPE)
9 July 2013; 20:00	(25–14, 27–25, 25–14); Report			Saint Petersburg Volleyball Center; Attendance: 900; Referees: Salem Abu Baker Alnoaman (UAE), Chung Shu-fang (TPE)

10 July 2013; 18:00	United States	0–3	Russia	Saint Petersburg Volleyball Center; Attendance: 4300; Referees: Wang Jun (CHN), Kang Joo-hee (KOR)
10 July 2013; 18:00	(16–25, 23–25, 19–25); Report			Saint Petersburg Volleyball Center; Attendance: 4300; Referees: Wang Jun (CHN), Kang Joo-hee (KOR)

==== Classification round ====
12 July 2013; 18:00	Slovakia	3–0	United States	Zilant Sport Complex; Attendance: 1000; Referees: Sasiprapa Pimthongkhonburi (THA), Chung Shu-Fang (TPE)
12 July 2013; 18:00	(25–10, 25–18, 25–19); Report			Zilant Sport Complex; Attendance: 1000; Referees: Sasiprapa Pimthongkhonburi (THA), Chung Shu-Fang (TPE)

13 July 2013; 15:00	United States	3–0	Norway	Tulpar Sport Complex; Attendance: 390; Referees: Chung Shu-fang (TPE), Agnieszka Michlic (POL)
13 July 2013; 15:00	(25–18, 25–15, 25–16); Report			Tulpar Sport Complex; Attendance: 390; Referees: Chung Shu-fang (TPE), Agnieszka Michlic (POL)

14 July 2013; 15:00	China	3–1	United States	Tulpar Sport Complex; Attendance: 232; Referees: Alexander Tubylov (RUS), Yoko Sanmi (JPN)
14 July 2013; 15:00	(25–20, 25–19, 22–25, 25–17); Report			Tulpar Sport Complex; Attendance: 232; Referees: Alexander Tubylov (RUS), Yoko Sanmi (JPN)

Final rank: 14

== Water polo ==
The United States has qualified both a men's team and a women's team.

=== Men ===
The men's team will participate in Group B.

==== Team roster ====
In the men's tournament, the United States will be represented by the University of California, Los Angeles water polo team. The roster is listed as follows:

Abbreviations
Pos.	Position	№	Cap number
A	Attacker	U	Utility
D	Defender	GK	Goalkeeper

№	Name	Pos.	Height	Weight	Year
6	Paul Pickell	A	6 ft 1 in (1.85 m)	200 lb (91 kg)	Junior
2	Lucas Reynolds	C	6 ft 5 in (1.96 m)	220 lb (100 kg)	Junior
12	Chris Wendt	D	6 ft 3 in (1.91 m)	202 lb (92 kg)	Junior
13	James Hartshorne	GK	6 ft 1 in (1.85 m)	170 lb (77 kg)	Junior
11	Chris Fahlsing	A	6 ft 0 in (1.83 m)	190 lb (86 kg)	Sophomore
9	Daniel Lenhart	A	6 ft 3 in (1.91 m)	180 lb (82 kg)	Sophomore
13	Chris Meinhold	A	6 ft 0 in (1.83 m)	190 lb (86 kg)	Sophomore
4	Paul Reynolds	A	6 ft 1 in (1.85 m)	170 lb (77 kg)	Sophomore
3	Alec Zwaneveld	C	6 ft 7 in (2.01 m)	230 lb (100 kg)	Freshman
1	Garrett Danner	GK	6 ft 1 in (1.85 m)	180 lb (82 kg)	Freshman
8	Anthony Daboub	D	6 ft 2 in (1.88 m)	215 lb (98 kg)	Freshman
7	Danny McClintick	U	6 ft 3 in (1.91 m)	195 lb (88 kg)	Freshman
5	Ryder Roberts	A	6 ft 1 in (1.85 m)		Freshman
13	Jack Fellner	A	6 ft 2 in (1.88 m)		Freshman
10	Chancellor Ramirez	C	6 ft 1 in (1.85 m)		Freshman

Head coach: Adam Wright
Assistant coach: Layne Beaubien
Manager: Myles Cooper

==== Preliminary round ====
Team	GP	W	D	L	GF	GA	GD	Pts
Italy	5	4	0	1	63	37	+26	8
Serbia	5	4	0	1	61	28	+33	8
United States	5	2	1	2	47	34	+13	5
Brazil	5	2	1	2	52	42	+10	5
Montenegro	5	2	0	3	56	39	+17	4
Belgium	5	0	0	5	13	112	–99	0

5 July 2013; 12:30	Report	United States	8–8	Brazil	Burevestnik Swimming Pool; Referees: David (FRA), Tahara (JPN)
5 July 2013; 12:30	Report	Score by quarters: 2–2, 3–3, 1–1, 2–2			Burevestnik Swimming Pool; Referees: David (FRA), Tahara (JPN)
5 July 2013; 12:30	Report	Reynolds 2	Goals	Baches Delgado 3	Burevestnik Swimming Pool; Referees: David (FRA), Tahara (JPN)

7 July 2013; 15:30	Report	Montenegro	8–9	United States	Burevestnik Swimming Pool; Referees: Franulovic (CRO), Mebuke (GEO)
7 July 2013; 15:30	Report	Score by quarters: 1–2, 0–3, 1–1, 6–3			Burevestnik Swimming Pool; Referees: Franulovic (CRO), Mebuke (GEO)
7 July 2013; 15:30	Report	Saric 3	Goals	Reynolds 3	Burevestnik Swimming Pool; Referees: Franulovic (CRO), Mebuke (GEO)

8 July 2013; 14:00	Report	Serbia	9–5	United States	Burevestnik Swimming Pool; Referees: Szekely (HUN), Shimizu (JPN)
8 July 2013; 14:00	Report	Score by quarters: 1–1, 2–1, 1–1, 5–2			Burevestnik Swimming Pool; Referees: Szekely (HUN), Shimizu (JPN)
8 July 2013; 14:00	Report	four players 2	Goals	five players 1	Burevestnik Swimming Pool; Referees: Szekely (HUN), Shimizu (JPN)

10 July 2013; 15:30	Report	United States	19–2	Belgium	Burevestnik Swimming Pool; Referees: Murray (CAN), Szekely (HUN)
10 July 2013; 15:30	Report	Score by quarters: 6–1, 5–0, 3–1, 5–0			Burevestnik Swimming Pool; Referees: Murray (CAN), Szekely (HUN)
10 July 2013; 15:30	Report	L. Reynolds 5	Goals	two players 2	Burevestnik Swimming Pool; Referees: Murray (CAN), Szekely (HUN)

11 July 2013; 15:30	Report	United States	6–7	Italy	Burevestnik Swimming Pool; Referees: Boros-Djevi (AUS), Gerzanich (RUS)
11 July 2013; 15:30	Report	Score by quarters: 1–2, 1–3, 2–2, 2–0			Burevestnik Swimming Pool; Referees: Boros-Djevi (AUS), Gerzanich (RUS)
11 July 2013; 15:30	Report	Lenhardt 2	Goals	Luongo 3	Burevestnik Swimming Pool; Referees: Boros-Djevi (AUS), Gerzanich (RUS)

==== Quarterfinals ====
13 July 2013; 17:00	Report	Hungary	12–7	United States	Burevestnik Swimming Pool; Referees: Franulovic (CRO), Carney (AUS)
13 July 2013; 17:00	Report	Score by quarters: 3–2, 3–2, 4–1, 2–2			Burevestnik Swimming Pool; Referees: Franulovic (CRO), Carney (AUS)
13 July 2013; 17:00	Report	three players 2	Goals	P. Reynolds, McClintick 2	Burevestnik Swimming Pool; Referees: Franulovic (CRO), Carney (AUS)

==== Classification round ====
15 July 2013; 15:30	Report	Australia	8–11	United States	Burevestnik Swimming Pool; Referees: Bianco (ITA), Vasenin (RUS)
15 July 2013; 15:30	Report	Score by quarters: 0–2, 2–3, 2–3, 4–3			Burevestnik Swimming Pool; Referees: Bianco (ITA), Vasenin (RUS)
15 July 2013; 15:30	Report	Sindone, Edwards 2	Goals	P. Reynolds 4	Burevestnik Swimming Pool; Referees: Bianco (ITA), Vasenin (RUS)

16 July 2013; 12:30	Report	United States	8–7	Japan	Burevestnik Swimming Pool; Referees: Carney (AUS), Dhossche (BEL)
16 July 2013; 12:30	Report	Score by quarters: 2–1, 2–1, 2–2, 2–3			Burevestnik Swimming Pool; Referees: Carney (AUS), Dhossche (BEL)
16 July 2013; 12:30	Report	three players 2	Goals	Takei 4	Burevestnik Swimming Pool; Referees: Carney (AUS), Dhossche (BEL)

Final rank: 5

=== Women ===
The women's team will participate in Group B.

==== Team roster ====
In the women's tournament, the United States will be represented by the University of California, Berkeley water polo team. The roster is listed as follows:

Abbreviations
Pos.	Position	№	Cap number
W	Wing (two-meters)	D	Driver
S	Set	GK	Goalkeeper

№	Name	Pos.	Height	Year
10	Brigitta Games	W	6 ft 1 in (1.85 m)	Freshman
8	Emily Loughlin	W	6 ft 0 in (1.83 m)	Freshman
7	Stephanie Mutafyan	D	5 ft 7 in (1.70 m)	Freshman
1	Kathleen Menz	GK	5 ft 8 in (1.73 m)	Sophomore
13	Kelsey Roland	GK	5 ft 11 in (1.80 m)	Freshman
11	Brooke Vowell	S	5 ft 10 in (1.78 m)	Freshman
5	Tiera Schroeder	D	5 ft 7 in (1.70 m)	Sophomore
6	Ashley Young	D	5 ft 6 in (1.68 m)	Junior
9	Meagan Smith	D	5 ft 8 in (1.73 m)	Freshman
4	Chris Baker	D	5 ft 8 in (1.73 m)	Sophomore
3	Sierra Smiley	S	5 ft 10 in (1.78 m)	Freshman
2	Missy Hale	D	5 ft 11 in (1.80 m)	Sophomore
12	Victoria Williams	D	5 ft 10 in (1.78 m)	Sophomore

Head coach: Richard Corso
Associate head coach: Matt Flesher

==== Preliminary round ====
Team	GP	W	D	L	GF	GA	GD	Pts
Hungary	3	2	1	0	30	19	+11	5
Australia	3	1	1	1	23	25	–2	3
France	3	1	1	1	24	24	0	3
United States	3	0	1	2	16	25	–9	1

6 July 2013; 11:30	Report	United States	5–12	Hungary	Olymp Swimming Pool; Referees: Deslieres (CAN), Vasenin (RUS)
6 July 2013; 11:30	Report	Score by quarters: 1–4, 1–4, 3–2, 0–2			Olymp Swimming Pool; Referees: Deslieres (CAN), Vasenin (RUS)
6 July 2013; 11:30	Report	Mutafyan 2	Goals	Somhegyi 3	Olymp Swimming Pool; Referees: Deslieres (CAN), Vasenin (RUS)

8 July 2013; 18:30	Report	United States	5–7	France	Olymp Swimming Pool; Referees: Murray (CAN), Tahara (JPN)
8 July 2013; 18:30	Report	Score by quarters: 1–2, 1–2, 2–2, 1–1			Olymp Swimming Pool; Referees: Murray (CAN), Tahara (JPN)
8 July 2013; 18:30	Report	five players 1	Goals	Clomes, Tardy 2	Olymp Swimming Pool; Referees: Murray (CAN), Tahara (JPN)

10 July 2013; 18:30	Report	Australia	6–6	United States	Olymp Swimming Pool; Referees: Mebuke (GEO), Riccitelli (ITA)
10 July 2013; 18:30	Report	Score by quarters: 1–1, 1–0, 2–2, 2–3			Olymp Swimming Pool; Referees: Mebuke (GEO), Riccitelli (ITA)
10 July 2013; 18:30	Report	six players 1	Goals	Young 3	Olymp Swimming Pool; Referees: Mebuke (GEO), Riccitelli (ITA)

==== Quarterfinals ====
12 July 2013; 20:00	Report	Russia	20–7	United States	Burevestnik Swimming Pool; Referees: Dhossche (BEL), Murray (CAN)
12 July 2013; 20:00	Report	Score by quarters: 4–2, 6–2, 6–2, 4–1			Burevestnik Swimming Pool; Referees: Dhossche (BEL), Murray (CAN)
12 July 2013; 20:00	Report	Lisunova 8	Goals	Hale, Young 2	Burevestnik Swimming Pool; Referees: Dhossche (BEL), Murray (CAN)

==== Classification round ====
14 July 2013; 15:30	Report	United States	5–9	Australia	Burevestnik Swimming Pool; Referees: Gerzanich (RUS), Rakovic-Krstonosic (SRB)
14 July 2013; 15:30	Report	Score by quarters: 0–4, 2–1, 2–2, 1–2			Burevestnik Swimming Pool; Referees: Gerzanich (RUS), Rakovic-Krstonosic (SRB)
14 July 2013; 15:30	Report	Young 2	Goals	Symons 3	Burevestnik Swimming Pool; Referees: Gerzanich (RUS), Rakovic-Krstonosic (SRB)

16 July 2013; 15:00	Report	United States	8–9 (OT)	France	Burevestnik Swimming Pool; Referees: Rodrigues (BRA), Shimizu (JPN)
16 July 2013; 15:00	Report	Score by quarters: 2–2, 3–3, 2–2, 1–1 OT: 0–1			Burevestnik Swimming Pool; Referees: Rodrigues (BRA), Shimizu (JPN)
16 July 2013; 15:00	Report	Schroeder 3	Goals	Tardy 3	Burevestnik Swimming Pool; Referees: Rodrigues (BRA), Shimizu (JPN)

Final rank: 8

== Weightlifting ==
The United States will be represented by seven male and seven female weightlifters.

=== Men ===
Athlete	Event	Snatch		Clean & Jerk		Total	Rank
Athlete	Event	Result	Rank	Result	Rank	Total	Rank
Matthew Sisley	77 kg	–	DNF	–	–	–	–
Michael Asbate	77 kg	120	19	142	20	262	19
Daniel Schlag	85 kg	133	14	167	12	300	12
Michael Nackoul	85 kg	145	10	186	8	331	9
Kendrick Farris	94 kg	161	7	211	2	372	3rd place, bronze medalist(s)
Kollin Cockrell	105 kg	143	17	180	16	323	16
Ian Wilson	105 kg	158	13	197	10	355	11

=== Women ===
Athlete	Event	Snatch		Clean & Jerk		Total	Rank
Athlete	Event	Result	Rank	Result	Rank	Total	Rank
Suzanna Sanchez	48 kg	64	10	–	–	–	–
Megan Kranz	63 kg	80	13	98	14	178	14
Vanessa McCoy	63 kg	83	11	103	12	186	11
Erin Wallace	69 kg	–	DNF	–	–	–	–
Sylvia Hoffman	69 kg	78	17	95	17	173	17

== Wrestling ==
The United States will be represented in each weight category by twenty-one wrestlers.

Key:

- VT - Victory by Fall.
- PP - Decision by Points - the loser with technical points.
- PO - Decision by Points - the loser without technical points.

=== Men ===
Greco-Roman

Athlete	Event	Qualification Round	Round of 16	Quarterfinal	Semifinal	Repechage 1	Repechage 2	Final / BM	
Athlete	Event	Opposition Result	Opposition Result	Opposition Result	Opposition Result	Opposition Result	Opposition Result	Opposition Result	Rank
Max Nowry	55 kg	—N/a	Hovhannisyan (ARM); W 4–0 ^{PO}	Choi (KOR); W 4–0 ^{PO}	Ciobanu (MDA); L 1–3 ^{PP}	Bye		Tanokura (JPN); L 0–4 ^{PO}	5
Nikko Triggas	60 kg	Bye	Turkishvili (GEO); L 0–4 ^{PO}	did not advance					
Joe Locksmith	66 kg	Byabangard (IRI); L 0–4 ^{PO}	did not advance						
Geordan Speiller	74 kg	Bye	Alizadehpournia (IRI); L 1–3 ^{PP}	did not advance		Pyshkow (UKR); L 0–3 ^{PO}	did not advance		
Dan Olsen	84 kg	Bye	Manukchekhr (TJK); W 3–1 ^{PP}	Hamzatau (BLR); L 1–4 ^{PP}	did not advance				
Beau Wenger	96 kg	Bye	Laurinaitis (LTU); L 0–5 ^{EX}	did not advance					
Tyrell Fortune	120 kg	Bye	Aliakbari (IRI); L 0–4 ^{PO}	did not advance		—N/a	Gogisvanidze (GEO); W 5–0 ^{VB}	Lam (UKR); L 1–3 ^{PP}	5

Freestyle

Athlete	Event	Qualification Round	Round of 16	Quarterfinal	Semifinal	Repechage 1	Repechage 2	Final / BM	
Athlete	Event	Opposition Result	Opposition Result	Opposition Result	Opposition Result	Opposition Result	Opposition Result	Opposition Result	Rank
Nico Megaludis	55 kg	Aliyev (AZE); W 3–1 ^{PP}	Heidargholinezhad (IRI); L 0–3 ^{PO}	did not advance					
Tyler Graff	60 kg	Frangulyan (ARM); W 4–1 ^{PP}	Shuptar (UKR); L 1–3 ^{PP}	did not advance					
James Green	66 kg	Martikainen (FIN); W 4–0 ^{PO}	Mamatov (KGZ); L 1–3 ^{PP}	did not advance					
David Taylor III	74 kg	Erbotsonashvili (GEO); W 3–1 ^{PP}	Taskoudis (GRE); W 4–0 ^{PO}	Tsargush (RUS); L 0–4 ^{PO}	Did not advance	Bye	Afzalipaemami (IRI); W 5–0 ^{VT}	Dorjvaanchig (MGL); W 3–1 ^{PP}	3rd place, bronze medalist(s)
Ed Ruth	84 kg	Mohammadian (IRI); L 0–4 ^{PO}	did not advance						
Micah Burak	96 kg	Toth (HUN); W 3–1 ^{PP}	Jumayev (KAZ); L 0–3 ^{PO}	did not advance					
Tyrell Fortune	120 kg	Rudavicius (LTU); W 4–0 ^{PO}	Meshvildishvili (GEO); W 4–0 ^{PO}	Khostianivskyi (UKR); L 1–3 ^{PP}	Did not advance	Bye	Dubko (BLR); W 4–0 ^{PO}	Lazarev (KGZ); W 5–0 ^{VT}	3rd place, bronze medalist(s)

=== Women ===
Freestyle

Athlete	Event	Round of 16	Quarterfinal	Semifinal	Repechage 1	Repechage 2	Final / BM	
Athlete	Event	Opposition Result	Opposition Result	Opposition Result	Opposition Result	Opposition Result	Opposition Result	Rank
Victoria Anthony	48 kg	Matejova (SVK); W 4–0 ^{PO}	Tosaka (JPN); L 1–3 ^{PP}	Did not advance	—N/a	Chepsarakova (RUS); L 1–3 ^{PP}	did not advance	
Candace Workman	51 kg	Ylinen (FIN); L 0–5 ^{VT}	did not advance					
Sarah Hildebrandt	55 kg	Kebic (TUR); W 4–1 ^{PP}	Hwang (PRK); L 1–3 ^{PP}	Did not advance				
Allison Ragan	59 kg	Ito (JPN); W 3–1 ^{PP}	Milovitch-Sera (CAN); W 4–0 ^{PO}	Barka (HUN); W 3–1 ^{PP}	—N/a	Bye	Ratkevich (AZE); L 0–4 ^{PO}	2nd place, silver medalist(s)
Jennifer Page	63 kg	Garcia Garrido (ESP); W 4–0 ^{PO}	Watari (JPN); L 0–4 ^{PO}	Did not advance				
Veronica Carlson	67 kg	Kunangarayeva (KAZ); W 3–0 ^{PO}	Ochirbat (MGL); L 0–5 ^{VT}	Did not advance	—N/a		Stadnik (UKR); L 0–4 ^{PO}	4
Brittney Roberts	72 kg	Lavreniuk (UKR); W 4–0 ^{PO}	Levchenko (BLR); W 5–0 ^{VT}	Enkhbayar (MGL); W 4–0 ^{PO}	—N/a	Bye	Bukina (RUS); L 0–4 ^{PO}	2nd place, silver medalist(s)
