= Swimming at the 2013 Summer Universiade =

Swimming at the XXVII Summer Universiade
- Venues: Akcharlak Swimming Pool; Aquatics Palace; Rowing Centre
- Dates: July 10, 2013 – July 17, 2013

Swimming was contested at the 2013 Summer Universiade from July 10 to 17 in Kazan, Russia. The swimming competitions was held at the Akcharlak Swimming Pool and the Aquatics Place, while the open water competitions was held at the Rowing Centre.

== Medal summary ==
=== Medal table ===
Rank	Nation	Gold	Silver	Bronze	Total
1	Russia (RUS)*	17	8	4	29
2	United States (USA)	6	9	9	24
3	Japan (JPN)	4	9	5	18
4	Australia (AUS)	4	2	4	10
5	Belarus (BLR)	4	2	0	6
6	Italy (ITA)	3	3	9	15
7	Ukraine (UKR)	1	2	2	5
8	Canada (CAN)	1	1	3	5
9	Poland (POL)	1	0	1	2
10	Hungary (HUN)	1	0	0	1
10	South Africa (RSA)	1	0	0	1
12	France (FRA)	0	2	0	2
13	China (CHN)	0	1	0	1
13	Czech Republic (CZE)	0	1	0	1
13	Ireland (IRL)	0	1	0	1
16	Great Britain (GBR)	0	0	3	3
17	Croatia (CRO)	0	0	1	1
17	Germany (GER)	0	0	1	1
17	Greece (GRE)	0	0	1	1
Totals (19 entries)		43	41	43	127

=== Men's events ===
Event	Gold		Silver		Bronze	
50 m freestyle	Vladimir Morozov; Russia	21.67 UR	Andrey Grechin; Russia	22.10	Andriy Hovorov; Ukraine	22.17
100 m freestyle	Vladimir Morozov; Russia	47.62 UR	Nikita Lobintsev; Russia	48.54	Michele Santucci; Italy	49.30
200 m freestyle	Danila Izotov; Russia	1:45.48 UR	Nikita Lobintsev; Russia	1:46.30	Paweł Korzeniowski; Poland	1:46.91
400 m freestyle	Ryan Napoleon; Australia	3:48.96	Kohei Yamamoto; Japan	3:49.03	Fumiya Hidaka; Japan	3:50.63
800 m freestyle	Kohei Yamamoto; Japan	7:49.96	Serhiy Frolov; Ukraine	7:51.02	Eric Hedlin; Canada	7:53.78
1500 m freestyle	Sean Ryan; United States	14:57.33	Kohei Yamamoto; Japan	15:00.15	Serhiy Frolov; Ukraine	15:02.63
50 m backstroke	Benjamin Treffers; Australia	24.86	Vladimir Morozov; Russia	24.87	Stefano Pizzamiglio; Italy	24.92
100 m backstroke	Yuki Shirai; Japan	53.70	Benjamin Treffers; Australia	53.76	Jacob Pebley; United States	54.11
200 m backstroke	Jack Conger; United States	1:55.47	Yuki Shirai; Japan	1:56.95	Jacob Pebley; United States	1:57.43
50 m breaststroke	Giulio Zorzi; South Africa	27.44	Andrea Toniato; Italy	27.53	Vladimir Morozov; Russia	27.70
100 m breaststroke	Yasuhiro Koseki; Japan	1:00.00	Mihail Alexandrov; United States	1:00.30	Edoardo Giorgetti; Italy	1:00.36
200 m breaststroke	Viatcheslav Sinkevich; Russia	2:09.78	Yukihiro Takahashi; Japan	2:10.35	Luca Pizzini; Italy	2:10.99
50 m butterfly	Yauhen Tsurkin; Belarus	23.28	None awarded		Piero Codia; Italy	23.38
50 m butterfly	Andriy Hovorov; Ukraine	23.28	None awarded		Piero Codia; Italy	23.38
100 m butterfly	Paweł Korzeniowski; Poland	51.75	Yauhen Tsurkin; Belarus	51.80	Evgeny Koptelov; Russia	52.04
200 m butterfly	Bence Biczó; Hungary	1:55.32	Kenta Hirai; Japan	1:55.90	Stefanos Dimitriadis; Greece	1:57.36
200 m individual medley	Justin James; Australia	1:58.35	Hiromasa Fujimori; Japan	1:58.76	Takahiro Tsutsumi; Japan	1:59.54
400 m individual medley	Michael Weiss; United States	4:12.00 UR	Takeharu Fujimori; Japan	4:13.43	Lewis Smith; Great Britain	4:16.86
4×100 m freestyle relay	Russia (RUS); Andrey Grechin; Danila Izotov; Nikita Lobintsev; Vladimir Morozov	3:10.88 UR	Australia (AUS); Andrew Abood; Daniel Arnamnart; Jayden Hadler; Justin James	3:16.33	Italy (ITA); Lorenzo Benatti; Gianluca Maglia; Stefano Pizzamiglio; Michele Santucci	3:16.64
4×200 m freestyle relay	Russia (RUS); Danila Izotov; Nikita Lobintsev; Artem Lobuzov; Alexander Sukhorukov	7:05.49 UR	United States (USA); Michael Weiss; Michael Wynalda; Austin Surhoff; Matthew Barber	7:13.58	Australia (AUS); Ryan Napoleon; Justin James; George O'Brien; Shane Asbury	7:15.50
4×100 m medley relay	Russia (RUS); Vladimir Morozov; Kirill Strelnikov; Evgeny Koptelov; Andrey Grechin	3:34.27	Japan (JPN); Yuki Shirai; Yasuhiro Koseki; Masayuki Umemoto; Katsumi Nakamura	3:34.41	United States (USA); Jack Conger; Mihail Alexandrov; Kyler Van Swol; Michael Wynalda	3:34.63
10 km marathon	Matteo Furlan; Italy	1:56:12.4	Romain Beraud; France	1:56:14.4	Andreas Waschburger; Germany	1:56:16.3

=== Women's events ===
Event	Gold		Silver		Bronze	
50 m freestyle	Aleksandra Gerasimenya; Belarus	24.48 UR	Anna Santamans; France	24.81	Megan Romano; United States	24.98
100 m freestyle	Aleksandra Gerasimenya; Belarus	53.50 UR	Veronika Popova; Russia	54.12	Megan Romano; United States	54.45
200 m freestyle	Viktoriya Andreyeva; Russia	1:57.31 UR	Veronika Popova; Russia	1:57.40	Caitlin McClatchey; Great Britain	1:58.20
400 m freestyle	Martina de Memme; Italy	4:07.69	Elena Sokolova; Russia	4:08.51	Caitlin McClatchey; Great Britain	4:08.77
800 m freestyle	Martina de Memme; Italy	8:28.09	Stephanie Peacock; United States	8:28.21	Ashley Steenvoorden; United States	8:29.79
1500 m freestyle	Stephanie Peacock; United States	16:04.44 UR	Ashley Steenvoorden; United States	16:07.89	Martina Rita Caramignoli; Italy	16:19.71
50 m backstroke	Anastasia Zueva; Russia	27.89 UR	Aleksandra Gerasimenya; Belarus	28.01	Madison Wilson; Australia	28.33
100 m backstroke	Anastasia Zueva; Russia	59.83 UR	Megan Romano; United States	59.85	Madison Wilson; Australia	1:00.65
200 m backstroke	Madison Wilson; Australia	2:09.22	Daryna Zevina; Ukraine	2:09.41	Hayle White; Australia	2:09.84
50 m breaststroke	Yuliya Yefimova; Russia	30.12 UR	Petra Chocová; Czech Republic	30.99	Valentina Artemyeva; Russia	31.39
100 m breaststroke	Yuliya Yefimova; Russia	1:05.48 UR	Fiona Doyle; Ireland	1:07.66	Laura Sogar; United States	1:07.78
200 m breaststroke	Yuliya Yefimova; Russia	2:24.10	Laura Sogar; United States	2:25.33	Mio Motegi; Japan	2:25.73
50 m butterfly	Aleksandra Gerasimenya; Belarus	25.84 UR	Katerine Savard; Canada	26.05	Elena Gemo; Italy	26.28
50 m butterfly	Aleksandra Gerasimenya; Belarus	25.84 UR	Katerine Savard; Canada	26.05	Silvia Di Pietro; Italy	26.28
100 m butterfly	Katerine Savard; Canada	57.63 UR	Guo Fan; China	58.98	Nao Kobayashi; Japan	58.99
200 m butterfly	Kona Fujita; Japan	2:09.66	Nao Kobayashi; Japan	2:10.65	Yana Martynova; Russia	2:10.72
200 m individual medley	Viktoriya Andreyeva; Russia	2:12.32	Sarah Henry; United States	2:12.69	Melanie Margalis; United States	2:12.96
400 m individual medley	Yana Martynova; Russia	4:39.02	Meghan Hawthorne; United States	4:40.40	Sakiko Shimizu; Japan	4:42.09
4×100 m freestyle relay	Russia (RUS); Viktoriya Andreyeva; Daria Belyakina; Margarita Nesterova; Veronika Popova	3:38.15 UR	United States (USA); Rachael Acker; Liv Jensen; Andrea Murez; Megan Romano	3:38.60	Canada (CAN); Caroline Lapierre-Lemire; Brittany MacLean; Sandrine Mainville; Paige Schultz	3:40.71
4×200 m freestyle relay	United States (USA); Andrea Murez; Sarah Henry; Chelsea Chenault; Megan Romano	7:55.53	Russia (RUS); Veronika Popova; Daria Belyakina; Elena Sokolova; Viktoriya Andreyeva	7:55.76	Canada (CAN); Lindsay Delmar; Brittany MacLean; Paige Schultz; Savannah King	8:02.73
4×100 m medley relay	Russia (RUS); Anastasia Zueva; Yuliya Yefimova; Veronika Popova; Viktoriya Andreyeva	3:58.04 UR	Italy (ITA); Elena Gemo; Giulia de Ascentis; Elena di Liddo; Erika Ferraioli	4:02.61	United States (USA); Cindy Tran; Laura Sogar; Kelsey Floyd; Megan Romano	4:02.71
10 km marathon	Ashley Twichell; United States	2:05:00.9	Aurora Ponselé; Italy	2:05:31.9	Karla Šitić; Croatia	2:05:32.1
