= Rowing at the 2013 Summer Universiade – Men's single sculls =

The men's single sculls competition at the 2013 Summer Universiade in Kazan took place the Kazan Rowing Centre.

== Results ==
=== Heats ===
==== Heat 1 ====
Rank	Rower	Country	Time	Notes
1	Mindaugas Griskonis	Lithuania	7:15.40	Q
2	Philipp Wende	Germany	7:25.66	Q
3	Samuel Volker	Australia	7:29.93	R
4	Sergii Gumennyi	Ukraine	7:43.41	R
5	Robert Ven	Finland	7:48.86	R
6	Rudolfs Rumba	Latvia	7:56.33	R

==== Heat 2 ====
Rank	Rower	Country	Time	Notes
1	Patrick Loliger	Mexico	7:30.65	Q
2	Benjamin Chabanet	France	7:34.27	Q
3	Ilia Kondratiev	Russia	7:46.68	R
4	Ruben Padilla	Spain	7:56.99	R
5	Petr Ourednicek	Czech Republic	8:09.44	R
6	Matthew Glenn	New Zealand	8:13.60	R

==== Heat 3 ====
Rank	Rower	Country	Time	Notes
1	Wiktor Chabel	Poland	7:32.68	Q
2	Jean-Benoit Valschaerts	Belgium	7:36.50	Q
3	Szilveszter Krisztian El	Hungary	7:46.07	R
4	Joosep Laos	Estonia	8:00.67	R
5	Imran Khan	Pakistan	9:31.21	R

=== Repechage ===
==== Repechage Heat 1 ====
Rank	Rower	Country	Time	Notes
1	Samuel Volker	Australia	8:08.91	Q
2	Joosep Laos	Estonia	8:14.78	Q
3	Petr Ourednicek	Czech Republic	8:16.07	Q
4	Rudolfs Rumba	Latvia	8:16.71	FC
5	Ilia Kondratiev	Russia	8:28.76	FC

==== Repechage Heat 2 ====
Rank	Rower	Country	Time	Notes
1	Robert Ven	Finland	8:06.19	Q
2	Sergii Gumennyi	Ukraine	8:09.79	Q
3	Ruben Padilla	Spain	8:15.26	Q
4	Szilveszter Krisztian El	Hungary	8:24.09	FC
5	Matthew Glenn	New Zealand	8:30.36	FC
6	Imran Khan	Pakistan	10:41.98	FC

=== Semifinals ===
==== Semifinal 1 ====
Rank	Rower	Country	Time	Notes
1	Mindaugas Griskonis	Lithuania	7:03.50	Q
2	Patrick Loliger	Mexico	7:11.58	Q
3	Jean-Benoit Valschaerts	Belgium	7:15.86	Q
4	Robert Ven	Finland	7:21.55	FB
5	Ruben Padilla	Spain	7:28.06	FB
6	Joosep Laos	Estonia	7:48.75	FB

==== Semifinal 2 ====
Rank	Rower	Country	Time	Notes
1	Sergii Gumennyi	Ukraine	7:11.41	Q
2	Wiktor Chabel	Poland	7:15.94	Q
3	Samuel Volker	Australia	7:17.76	Q
4	Benjamin Chabanet	France	7:19.62	FB
5	Philipp Wende	Germany	7:22.65	FB
6	Petr Ourednicek	Czech Republic	7:34.35	FB

=== Finals ===
==== Final A ====
Rank	Rower	Country	Time	Notes
1	Mindaugas Griskonis	Lithuania	7:18.32	
2	Patrick Loliger	Mexico	7:23.94	
3	Sergii Gumennyi	Ukraine	7:28.53	
4	Wiktor Chabel	Poland	7:33.74	
5	Samuel Volker	Australia	7:36.64	
6	Jean-Benoit Valschaerts	Belgium	7:41.44	
