= Iran at the 2013 Summer Universiade =

- IOC code: IRI

in Kazan
- Competitors: 21 in 3 sports
- Medals Ranked 33rd: Gold 1 Silver 5 Bronze 3 Total 9

Summer Universiade appearances (overview)
- 1973; 1975; 1977; 1979–2001; 2003; 2005; 2007; 2009; 2011; 2013; 2015; 2017; 2019; 2021; 2025; 2027

Iran competed at the 2013 Summer Universiade in Kazan, Russia from 6 to 17 July 2013, with 24 athletes in three sports.

== Medals ==
Medal	Name	Sport	Event
Gold	Rasoul Taghian Chadegani	Weightlifting	Men's 77 kg
Silver	Jaber Behrouzi	Weightlifting	Men's 69 kg
Silver	Bahador Moulaei	Weightlifting	Men's +105 kg
Silver	Behnam Ehsanpoor	Wrestling	Men's Freestyle 60 kg
Silver	Hadi Alizadeh Pournia	Wrestling	Men's Greco-Roman 74 kg
Silver	Amir Aliakbari	Wrestling	Men's Greco-Roman 120 kg
Bronze	Mohammadhossein Mohammadian	Wrestling	Men's Freestyle 84 kg
Bronze	Parviz Hadi Basmanj	Wrestling	Men's Freestyle 120 kg
Bronze	Mahdi Alyari Feizabadi	Wrestling	Men's Greco-Roman 96 kg

=== Medals by sport ===
Sport	Gold	Silver	Bronze	Total
Weightlifting	1	2	0	3
Wrestling	0	3	3	6
Totals (2 entries)	1	5	3	9

== Sports ==
=== Athletics ===
Athlete	Event	Qualification		Final	
Athlete	Event	Distance	Position	Distance	Position
Mahmoud Samimi	Discus Throw	60.18	4Q	59.76	5

=== Weightlifting ===
Athlete	Event	Snatch		Clean & jerk		Total	Rank
Athlete	Event	Result	Rank	Result	Rank	Total	Rank
Majid Askari	Men's 62 kg	121	5	145	8	266	8
Jabar Behrouzi	Men's 69 kg	147	2	175	3	322	2nd place, silver medalist(s)
Rasoul Taghian Chadegani	Men's 77 kg	157	2	198 UR	1	355 UR	1st place, gold medalist(s)
Amin Zarei Degarmandaragh	Men's 94 kg	166	4	201	4	367	5
Mohammadreza Barari	Men's 105 kg	170	5	~~211~~	DNF	—	DNF
Bahador Moulaei	Men's +105 kg	196	3	254 UR	1	450	2nd place, silver medalist(s)

=== Wrestling ===
Key:

- VT - Victory by Fall.
- ST - Great Superiority - a difference of 6 points - the loser without technical points.
- SP - Victory by technical superiority - a difference of 6 points - the loser with technical points.
- PP - Decision by Points - the loser with technical points.
- PO - Decision by Points - the loser without technical points.

Men's freestyle

Athlete	Event	Qualification	Round of 16	Quarterfinal	Semifinal	Repechage 1	Repechage 2	Final / BM	
Athlete	Event	Opposition Result	Opposition Result	Opposition Result	Opposition Result	Opposition Result	Opposition Result	Opposition Result	Rank
Yaser Heidargholinezhad	55 kg	BYE	Ri (PRK); W 3-1 ^{PP}	Megaludis (USA); W 3-0 ^{PO}	Nadyrbek Uulu (KGZ); L 1-3 ^{PP}	BYE		Primbayev (KAZ); L 0-4 ^{ST}	5
Behnam Ehsanpoor	60 kg	BYE	Batsaikhan (MGL) W 4-1 ^{PP}	Aliyev (AZE) W 3-0 ^{PO}	Ivanov (BUL) W 4-1 ^{PP}	BYE		Goygereev (RUS) L 0-4 ^{ST}	2nd place, silver medalist(s)
Masoud Kamarvand	66 kg	Mamatov (KGZ); L 1-3 ^{PP}	Did not advance						15
Reza Afzali Paemami	74 kg	Shimada (JPN) W 4-1 ^{PP}	Tsargush (RUS) L 0-4 ^{ST}	Did not advance		Talambat (MDA) W 4-1 ^{PP}	Taylor III (USA) L 0-5 ^{VT}	Did not advance	8
Mohammadhossein Mohammadian	84 kg	Ruth (USA); W 4-0 ^{ST}	Murtazaliev (ARM); W 3-1 ^{PP}	Kudiyamagomedov (RUS); L 1-3 ^{PP}	Did not advance	BYE	Kakhidze (KAZ); W 3-1 ^{PP}	Gustiyev (AZE); W 3-1 ^{PP}	3rd place, bronze medalist(s)
Jamal Mirzaei	96 kg	Musaev (KGZ) L 1-3 ^{PP}	Did not advance						14
Parviz Hadi Basmanj	120 kg	BYE	Akgul (TUR); L 0-4 ^{ST}	Did not advance		BYE	Magomedov (AZE); W 3-1 ^{PP}	Khugaev (RUS); W 3-1 ^{PP}	3rd place, bronze medalist(s)

Men's Greco-Roman

Athlete	Event	Qualification	Round of 16	Quarterfinal	Semifinal	Repechage 1	Repechage 2	Final / BM	
Athlete	Event	Opposition Result	Opposition Result	Opposition Result	Opposition Result	Opposition Result	Opposition Result	Opposition Result	Rank
Shirzad Beheshti Tala	55 kg	BYE	Begaliev (KGZ) L 0-5 ^{VT}	Did not advavce					11
Mohammad Nourbakhsh	60 kg	BYE	Pyslar (UKR) W 4-0 ^{ST}	Mammadov (AZE) L 1-3 ^{PP}	Did not advance	BYE	Sokol (CRO) W 3-0 ^{PO}	Turkishvili (GEO) L 0-4 ^{ST}	5
Afshin Byabangard	66 kg	Locksmith (USA) W 4-0 ^{ST}	Emilbekov (KGZ) W 4-0 ^{ST}	Otoizumi (JPN) W 4-0 ^{ST}	Chunayev (AZE) L 1-3 ^{PP}	BYE		Kocatinaz (TUR) L 1-3 ^{PP}	5
Hadi Alizadeh Pournia	74 kg	BYE	Speiller (USA) W 3-1 ^{PP}	Pyshkow (UKR) W 3-0 ^{PO}	Kulynycz (POL) W 4-0 ^{ST}	BYE		Vlasov (RUS) L 0-3 ^{PO}	2nd place, silver medalist(s)
Davoud Abedinzadeh Chadorchi	84 kg	Rerihs (LAT) W 4-0 ^{ST}	Zhanarbek (KGZ) W 3-1 ^{PP}	Khugaev (RUS) L 1-3 ^{PP}	Did not advance	BYE	Zgherea (MDA) W 3-0 ^{PO}	Hamzatu (BLR) L 1-3 ^{PP}	5
Mahdi Alyari Feizabadi	96 kg	Saparmammedov (TKM) W 3-0 ^{PO}	Alexuc Ciurariu (ROU) W 3-1 ^{PP}	Hrabovik (BLR) W 3-0 ^{PO}	Aleksanyan (ARM) L 1-3 ^{PP}	BYE		Demirci (TUR) W 5-0 ^{VT}	3rd place, bronze medalist(s)
Amir Aliakbari	120 kg	BYE	Fortune (USA) W 4-0 ^{ST}	Gogisvanidze (GEO) W 4-1 ^{PP}	Lam (HUN) W 4-0 ^{ST}	BYE		Kayaalp (TUR) L 1-3 ^{PP}	2nd place, silver medalist(s)
