= Mexico at the 2013 Summer Universiade =

- IOC code: MEX

in Kazan
- Competitors: 165 in 20 sports
- Medals Ranked 34th: Gold 1 Silver 4 Bronze 6 Total 11

Summer Universiade appearances
- 1959; 1961; 1963; 1965; 1967; 1970; 1973; 1975; 1977; 1979; 1981; 1983; 1985; 1987; 1989; 1991; 1993; 1995; 1997; 1999; 2001; 2003; 2005; 2007; 2009; 2011; 2013; 2015; 2017; 2019; 2021; 2025; 2027

Mexico competed at the 2013 Summer Universiade in Kazan, Russia from 6 to 17 July 2013.

== Medalists ==
Medal	Name	Sport	Event
Gold	Luis Rivera	Athletics	Men's long jump
Silver	Patrick Loliger	Rowing	Men's single sculls
Silver	Daniel Corral	Gymnastics	Men's pommel horse
Silver	Elsa García	Gymnastics	Women's floor
Silver	Mexico Women's Team	Football	Women's tournament
Bronze	Arantxa Chávez	Diving	Women's 3 metre springboard
Bronze	Yahel Castillo; Daniel Islas	Diving	Men's synchronized 3 metre springboard
Bronze	Iván García; Germán Sánchez	Diving	Men's synchronized 10 metre platform
Bronze	Paola Espinosa; Marisa Díaz	Diving	Women's synchronized 10 metre platform
Bronze	Paola Espinosa; Marisa Díaz; Arantxa Chávez	Diving	Women's team
Bronze	Iván García; Germán Sánchez; Yahel Castillo; Daniel Islas; Rommel Pacheco	Diving	Men's team

=== Medals by sport ===
Sport	Gold	Silver	Bronze	Total
Athletics	1	0	0	1
Gymnastics	0	2	0	2
Football	0	1	0	1
Rowing	0	1	0	1
Diving	0	0	6	6
Totals (5 entries)	1	4	6	11
