= Basketball at the 2013 Summer Universiade – Women's tournament =

Women's basketball at the XXVII Summer Universiade
- Venue: various
- Dates: July 8, 2013 – July 15, 2013
- Teams: 16

Medalists
1st place, gold medalist(s)		United States (USA)
2nd place, silver medalist(s)		Russia (RUS)
3rd place, bronze medalist(s)		Australia (AUS)

The women's tournament of basketball at the 2013 Summer Universiade in Kazan was held from July 8 to July 15.

== Teams ==
Americas	Africa	Asia	Europe	Oceania	Host nation
Brazil; Canada; United States	Mali	China; Chinese Taipei; Japan; Mongolia	Czech Republic; Finland; Hungary; Poland; Sweden; Ukraine	Australia	Russia

== Preliminary round ==
=== Group A ===
Team	Pld	W	L	PF	PA	PD	Pts
Russia	3	3	0	271	128	+143	6
Sweden	3	2	1	232	143	+89	5
Poland	3	1	2	202	187	+15	4
Mongolia	3	0	3	88	335	−247	3

8 July 2013
18:30

Report

Russia	123–23	Mongolia
Scoring by quarter: 31–10, 33–7, 30–0, 29–6

Basket Hall

8 July 2013
20:30

Report

Sweden	69–48	Poland
Scoring by quarter: 23–6, 22–15, 7–15, 17–12

Basket Hall

9 July 2013
18:30

Report

Russia	74–37	Poland
Scoring by quarter: 18–11, 19–6, 20–9, 17–11

Basket Hall

9 July 2013
20:30

Report

Sweden	95–21	Mongolia
Scoring by quarter: 25–0, 21–9, 26–6, 23–6

Basket Hall

10 July 2013
18:30

Report

Russia	74–68	Sweden
Scoring by quarter: 18–13, 15–20, 19–22, 22–13

Basket Hall

10 July 2013
20:30

Report

Poland	117–44	Mongolia
Scoring by quarter: 36–8, 18–10, 32–10, 31–16

Basket Hall

=== Group B ===
Team	Pld	W	L	PF	PA	PD	Pts
United States	3	3	0	326	168	+158	6
Czech Republic	3	2	1	206	208	−2	5
Brazil	3	1	2	216	242	−26	4
Mali	3	0	3	127	257	−130	3

8 July 2013
18:00

Report

Brazil	63–86	Czech Republic
Scoring by quarter: 23–30, 14–17, 7–24, 19–15

Olymp Sport Hall

8 July 2013
20:30

Report

United States	120–32	Mali
Scoring by quarter: 28–12, 29–8, 37–8, 26–4

Olymp Sport Hall

9 July 2013
18:00

Report

Brazil	78–51	Mali
Scoring by quarter: 19–12, 14–14, 26–10, 19–15

Miras Sports Complex

9 July 2013
20:30

Report

United States	101–61	Czech Republic
Scoring by quarter: 21–11, 27–16, 30–14, 23–20

Miras Sports Complex

10 July 2013
10:00

Report

Czech Republic	59–44	Mali
Scoring by quarter: 11–11, 17–12, 12–6, 19–15

Miras Sports Complex

10 July 2013
12:30

Report

United States	105–75	Brazil
Scoring by quarter: 36–16, 20–16, 26–19, 23–24

Miras Sports Complex

=== Group C ===
Team	Pld	W	L	PF	PA	PD	Pts
Chinese Taipei	3	3	0	225	199	+26	6
Canada	3	1	2	200	179	+21	4
Ukraine	3	1	2	193	209	−16	4
Japan	3	1	2	180	211	−31	4

8 July 2013
10:00

Report

Canada	76–48	Japan
Scoring by quarter: 18–6, 24–14, 21–12, 13–16

Biek Tau Sports Complex

8 July 2013
12:30

Report

Chinese Taipei	84–68	Ukraine
Scoring by quarter: 17–17, 15–21, 27–18, 25–12

Biek Tau Sports Complex

9 July 2013
10:00

Report

Canada	57–59	Ukraine
Scoring by quarter: 13–19, 15–8, 20–16, 9–16

Miras Sports Complex

9 July 2013
12:30

Report

Chinese Taipei	69–64	Japan
Scoring by quarter: 18–16, 17–14, 14–17, 20–17

Miras Sports Complex

10 July 2013
18:00

Report

Japan	68–66	Ukraine
Scoring by quarter: 18–15, 12–14, 17–19, 21–18

Miras Sports Complex

10 July 2013
20:30

Report

Chinese Taipei	72–67	Canada
Scoring by quarter: 21–11, 18–9, 21–23, 12–24

Miras Sports Complex

=== Group D ===
Team	Pld	W	L	PF	PA	PD	Pts
Australia	3	3	0	268	144	+124	6
Hungary	3	2	1	197	205	−8	5
China	3	1	2	186	236	−50	4
Finland	3	0	3	167	233	−66	3

8 July 2013
18:00

Report

Finland	62–74	China
Scoring by quarter: 8–26, 15–12, 19–20, 20–16

Biek Tau Sports Complex

8 July 2013
20:30

Report

Australia	79–53	Hungary
Scoring by quarter: 21–11, 20–9, 22–13, 16–20

Biek Tau Sports Complex

9 July 2013
18:00

Report

Finland	59–64	Hungary
Scoring by quarter: 13–17, 24–11, 16–20, 6–16

Olymp Sport Hall

9 July 2013
20:30

Report

Australia	94–45	China
Scoring by quarter: 18–14, 20–8, 30–10, 26–13

Olymp Sport Hall

10 July 2013
18:00

Report

China	67–80	Hungary
Scoring by quarter: 24–23, 12–12, 16–21, 15–24

Olymp Sport Hall

10 July 2013
20:30

Report

Australia	95–46	Finland
Scoring by quarter: 19–6, 23–8, 23–16, 30–16

Olymp Sport Hall

== Classification rounds ==
=== Quarterfinal round ===
==== 9th–16th place ====
12 July 2013
10:00

Report

China	80–74	Japan
Scoring by quarter: 15–19, 23–18, 15–22, 27–15

Biek Tau Sports Complex

12 July 2013
12:30

Report

Ukraine	80–51	Finland
Scoring by quarter: 23–10, 13–21, 30–11, 14–9

Biek Tau Sports Complex

12 July 2013
18:00

Report

Poland	82–52	Mali
Scoring by quarter: 26–13, 16–13, 24–8, 16–18

Biek Tau Sports Complex

12 July 2013
20:30

Report

Brazil	94–46	Mongolia
Scoring by quarter: 22–8, 25–6, 23–15, 24–17

Biek Tau Sports Complex

=== Semifinal round ===
==== 13th–16th place ====
13 July 2013
10:00

Report

Japan	109–61	Mali
Scoring by quarter: 30–13, 23–14, 24–19, 32–15

Miras Sports Complex

13 July 2013
12:30

Report

Finland	84–38	Mongolia
Scoring by quarter: 32–5, 15–5, 19–20, 18–8

Miras Sports Complex

==== 9th–12th place ====
13 July 2013
18:00

Report

China	57–49	Poland
Scoring by quarter: 23–8, 9–12, 10–12, 15–17

Miras Sports Complex

13 July 2013
20:30

Report

Ukraine	76–66	Brazil
Scoring by quarter: 22–6, 23–28, 23–15, 8–17

Miras Sports Complex

==== 5th–8th place ====
13 July 2013
10:30

Report

Czech Republic	77–67	Hungary
Scoring by quarter: 18–21, 21–4, 19–18, 19–24

Basket Hall

13 July 2013
13:00

Report

Sweden	75–72 (OT)	Canada
Scoring by quarter: 15–20, 10–17, 22–6, 19–23, Overtime: 9–6

Basket Hall

=== Final round ===
==== 15th-place game ====
15 July 2013
10:00

Report

Mali	84–67	Mongolia
Scoring by quarter: 19–25, 22–7, 24–16, 19–19

Biek Tau Sports Complex

==== 13th-place game ====
15 July 2013
12:30

Report

Japan	78–63	Finland
Scoring by quarter: 22–16, 19–20, 19–12, 18–15

Biek Tau Sports Complex

==== 11th-place game ====
15 July 2013
10:00

Report

Poland	73–59	Brazil
Scoring by quarter: 18–18, 16–17, 19–10, 20–14

Olymp Sport Hall

==== 9th-place game ====
15 July 2013
12:30

Report

China	72–85	Ukraine
Scoring by quarter: 16–21, 21–23, 11–17, 24–24

Olymp Sport Hall

==== 7th-place game ====
15 July 2013
10:00

Report

Canada	55–60	Hungary
Scoring by quarter: 17–10, 16–19, 8–15, 14–16

Basket Hall

==== 5th-place game ====
15 July 2013
12:30

Report

Sweden	72–63	Czech Republic
Scoring by quarter: 24–14, 11–13, 9–17, 28–19

Basket Hall

== Elimination round ==
Quarterfinals
B1	United States	103
A2	Sweden	72
D1	Australia	72
C2	Canada	58
A1	Russia	74
B2	Czech Republic	66
C1	Chinese Taipei	72
D2	Hungary	41

Semifinals
B1	United States	79
D1	Australia	78
A1	Russia	69
C1	Chinese Taipei	51

Gold-medal game
B1	United States	90
A1	Russia	71
Bronze-medal game
D1	Australia	99
C1	Chinese Taipei	58

=== Quarterfinals ===
12 July 2013
10:30

Report

United States	103–72	Sweden
Scoring by quarter: 26–24, 25–16, 24–16, 28–16

Basket Hall

12 July 2013
18:00

Report

Australia	72–58	Canada
Scoring by quarter: 23–15, 14–12, 18–7, 17–24

Miras Sports Complex

12 July 2013
18:30

Report

Russia	74–66	Czech Republic
Scoring by quarter: 16–19, 13–14, 25–23, 20–10

Basket Hall

12 July 2013
20:30

Report

Chinese Taipei	72–41	Hungary
Scoring by quarter: 15–12, 20–9, 23–8, 14–12

Miras Sports Complex

=== Semifinals ===
13 July 2013
18:30

Report

Russia	69–51	Chinese Taipei
Scoring by quarter: 23–17, 13–13, 17–8, 16–13

Basket Hall

13 July 2013
21:00

Report

United States	79–78	Australia
Scoring by quarter: 13–20, 19–13, 30–16, 17–29

Basket Hall

=== Bronze-medal game ===
15 July 2013
19:00

Report

Australia	99–58	Chinese Taipei
Scoring by quarter: 27-13, 24-10, 23-18, 25-17
Pts: Cumming, Madgen 23; Rebs: Madgen, Blicavs 9 Asts: Madgen 5		Pts: Huang Ying-Li 14; Rebs: Hsieh Pei-Chun 5 Asts: Chang Chi-Fang, Hsu Chien-Hui 5

Basket Hall
Referees: Gina Cross (USA), Karen Lasuik (CAN), Karla Diniz (BRA)

=== Gold-medal game ===
15 July 2013
21:30

Report

United States	90–71	Russia
Scoring by quarter: 22–13, 19–14, 27–20, 22–24
Pts: Hartley 17; Rebs: Hooper 9 Asts: Massengale 5		Pts: Vieru 13; Rebs: Vieru 9 Asts: Logunova 4

Basket Hall
Attendance: 4,000
Referees: Ivana Ivanovic (SRB), Wang Zebo (CHN), Toni Caldwell (AUS)

== Final standings ==
Place	Team	Score
1st place, gold medalist(s)	United States	6–0
2nd place, silver medalist(s)	Russia	5–1
3rd place, bronze medalist(s)	Australia	5–1
4	Chinese Taipei	4–2
5	Sweden	4–2
6	Czech Republic	3–3
7	Hungary	3–3
8	Canada	1–5
9	Ukraine	4–2
10	China	3–3
11	Poland	3–3
12	Brazil	2–4
13	Japan	3–3
14	Finland	1–5
15	Mali	1–5
16	Mongolia	0–6
