= Beach volleyball at the 2013 Summer Universiade – Men's tournament =

Men's Beach Volleyball at the XXVII Summer Universiade
- Venue: Kazanka Beach Volleyball Centre
- Dates: July 7–13
- Teams: 32

The men's tournament of Beach volleyball at the 2013 Summer Universiade in Kazan was held between July 7–13.

== Medalists ==
Gold	Silver	Bronze
Poland (POL); Michał Kądzioła; Jakub Szałankiewicz	Germany (GER); Armin Dollinger; Jonas Schröder	Russia (RUS); Yaroslav Koshkarev; Konstantin Semenov

== Preliminary round ==
=== Group I ===
Pos	Team	Pld	W	L	Pts	SW	SL	SR	SPW	SPL	SPR
1	(Russia) Semenov–Koshkarev	3	3	0	6	6	0	MAX	126	75	1.680
2	(Austria) Dressler–Kandolf	3	2	1	5	4	3	1.333	129	117	1.103
3	(New Zealand) Hartles–Hawkins	3	1	2	4	2	4	0.500	108	111	0.973
4	(Hong Kong) Wong–Yeung	3	0	3	3	1	6	0.167	80	140	0.571

=== Group J ===
Pos	Team	Pld	W	L	Pts	SW	SL	SR	SPW	SPL	SPR
1	(Poland) Kadliola–Szalankkiewic	3	3	0	6	0	0	—	132	105	1.257
2	(Turkey) Gogtepe H.–Gogtepe P.	3	2	1	5	4	4	1.000	147	151	0.974
3	(Italy) Cecchini–Morichelli	3	1	2	4	3	5	0.600	160	163	0.982
4	(United States) Carlos–Hughes	3	0	3	3	2	6	0.333	135	165	0.818

=== Group K ===
Pos	Team	Pld	W	L	Pts	SW	SL	SR	SPW	SPL	SPR
1	(United States) Montgomery–Bourne	3	3	0	6	6	1	6.000	137	113	1.212
2	(Russia) Prokopyev-Bogatov	3	2	1	5	5	2	2.500	138	116	1.190
3	(Norway) Retterholt–Bogatov	3	1	2	4	2	4	0.500	112	120	0.933
4	(Brazil) Cândido–da Silva	3	0	3	3	0	6	0.000	89	127	0.701

=== Group L ===
Pos	Team	Pld	W	L	Pts	SW	SL	SR	SPW	SPL	SPR
1	(Czech Republic) Kufa–Hadrava	3	3	0	6	6	1	6.000	137	84	1.631
2	(Austria) Koraimann–Schnetzer	3	2	1	5	5	3	1.667	145	114	1.272
3	(Oman) Al Shureiqi–Al Housni	3	1	2	4	3	4	0.750	112	111	1.009
4	(Northern Mariana Islands) McCollough Stearns–Nekaifes	3	0	3	3	0	6	0.000	41	126	0.325

=== Group M ===
Pos	Team	Pld	W	L	Pts	SW	SL	SR	SPW	SPL	SPR
1	(Germany) Dollinger–Shroeder	3	3	0	6	6	1	6.000	138	92	1.500
2	(Thailand) Sangkhachot-Sukto	3	2	1	5	5	3	1.667	135	140	0.964
3	(Belarus) Dziadkou–Vishneuski	3	1	2	4	3	5	0.600	145	150	0.967
4	(Japan) Sato–Shoji	3	0	3	3	1	6	0.167	112	148	0.757

=== Group N ===
Pos	Team	Pld	W	L	Pts	SW	SL	SR	SPW	SPL	SPR
1	(Mexico) Ontiveros Gomez–Virgen Pulido	3	3	0	6	6	1	6.000	139	101	1.376
2	(China) Gong-Li	3	2	1	5	3	4	0.750	124	132	0.939
3	(France) Alimi–Duee	3	1	2	4	0	0	—	0	0	—
4	(Israel) Faiga–Hilman	3	0	3	3	2	5	0.400	118	136	0.868

=== Group O ===
Pos	Team	Pld	W	L	Pts	SW	SL	SR	SPW	SPL	SPR
1	(Germany) Dittelbach–Flueggen	3	3	0	6	6	1	6.000	143	109	1.312
2	(Canada) O'Gorman-Pedlow	3	2	1	5	4	2	2.000	119	93	1.280
3	(Portugal) Alves–Silva	3	1	2	4	2	4	0.500	86	117	0.735
4	(Australia) Moore H.–Moore R.	3	0	3	3	1	6	0.167	117	146	0.801

=== Group P ===
Pos	Team	Pld	W	L	Pts	SW	SL	SR	SPW	SPL	SPR
1	(Brazil) Guimarães–Gormes	3	3	0	6	6	0	MAX	126	69	1.826
2	(Oman) Al Belushi-Al Subhi	3	2	1	5	4	2	2.000	113	108	1.046
3	(China) Lin–Wang	3	1	2	4	2	4	0.500	110	109	1.009
4	(United Arab Emirates) Ibrahim Hamza–Abdulla	3	0	3	3	0	6	0.000	123	126	0.976

== Bracket ==
=== Winners Brackets ===
==== Top half ====
First round
1
16
(Belarus) Dziad-Vishn	21	21
(Oman) Al Bel-Al Su	11	19
(Austria) Dress-Kando	18	21	11
(Oman) Al Sh-Al Ho	21	12	15
4
13
6
11
(France) Alimi-Duee	16	16
(Canada) O'Gor-Pedlo	21	21
(Turkey) Gogte-Gogte	17	15
(Norway) Rette-Solha	21	21
2
15

Second round
(Russia) Semen-Koshk	21	21
(Belarus) Dziad-Vishn	15	16
(Oman) Al Sh-Al Ho	14	16
(Brazil) Guimarães-Gomes	21	21
(Germany) Doli-Schro	21	21
(Canada) O'Gor-Pedlo	14	19
(Norway) Rette-Solha	17	21	12
(Czech Republic) Kufa-Hadra	21	18	15

Third round
(Russia) Semen-Koshk	21	19	15
(Brazil) Guimarães-Gomes	17	21	11
(Germany) Doli-Schro	21	21
(Czech Republic) Kufa Hadra	16	13

Fourth round
(Russia) Semen-Koshk	14	21	13
(Germany) Doli-Schro	21	14	15

==== Bottom half ====
First round
1
16
(Portugal) Alves-Silva	17	14
(China) Gong-Li	21	21
(Thailand) Sangk-Sukto	21	21
(China) Lin-Wang	10	15
4
13
6
11
(Italy) Cecch-Moric	14	16
(Austria) Korai-Schne	21	21
(Russia) Progo-Bogot	21	21
(New Zealand) Hartl-Hawki	15	10
2
15

Second round
(United States) Montg-Bourn	21	18	15
(China) Gong-Li	18	21	13
(Thailand) Sangk-Sukto	22	19	15
(Mexico) Ontiv-Virge	20	21	11
(Germany) Ditte-Flueg	21	21
(Austria) Korai-Schne	18	12
(Russia) Progo-Bogat	17	15
(Poland) Kadzi-Szala	21	21

Third round
(United States) Montg-Bourn	25	14
(Thailand) Sangk-Sukto	27	21
(Germany) Ditte-Flueg	16	14
(Poland) Kadzi-Szala	21	21

Fourth round
(Thailand) Sangk-Sukto	14	15
(Poland) Kadzi-Szala	21	21

=== Losers Bracket ===
==== 13th-24th Place ====
17th-24th place
(Russia) Proko-Bogat	21	21
(Oman) Al Be-Al Su	14	15
(Austria) Dress-Kando	0	0
(Austria) Korai-Schne	21	21

13th-16th place
(Russia) Proko-Bogat	21	21
(Austria) Korai-Schne	15	18

17th-24th place
(Mexico) Ontiv-Virge	21	21
(France) Alimi-Duee	16	10
(Turkey) Gogte-Gogte	21	21
(China) Gong-Li	13	16

13th-16th place
(Mexico) Ontiv-Virge	21	22
(Turkey) Gogte-Gogte	11	20

17th-24th place
(Norway) Rette-Solha	24	21
(Portugal) Alves-Silva	22	15
(China) Lin-Wang	12	11
(Canada) O'Gor-Pedlo	21	21

13th-16th place
(Norway) Rette-Solha	14	10
(Canada) O'Gor-Pedlo	21	21

17th-24th place
(Oman) Al Sh-Al Ho	0	0
(Italy) Cecch-Moric	21	21
(New Zealand) Hartl-Hawki	12	12
(Belarus) Dziad-Vishn	21	21

13th-16th place
(Italy) Cecch-Moric	14	20
(Belarus) Dziad-Vishn	21	22

==== 7th-12th place ====
9th-12th place
(Russia) Proko-Bogat	21	21
(Czech Republic) Kufa-Hadra	18	15
(Mexico) Ontiv-Virge	21	17	16
(Brazil) Guimarães-Gomes	15	21	14

7th-8th place
(Russia) Proko-Bogat	21	17	11
(Mexico) Ontiv-Virge	19	21	15

9th-12th place
(Canada) O'Gor-Pedlo	21	21
(Germany) Ditte-Flueg	18	17
(Belarus) Dziad-Vishn	17	10
(United States) Montg-Bourn	21	21

7th-8th place
(Canada) O'Gor-Pedlo	17	22
(United States) Montg-Bourn	21	24

==== 5th-6th place ====
5th-6th place
(Russia) Semen-Koshk	21	21
(United States) Montg-Bourn	17	17

5th-6th place
(Mexico) Ontiv-Virge	21	21
(Thailand) Sang-Sukto	15	19

=== Finals ===
Semifinals
(Poland) Kadzi-Szala	19	22	15
(Russia) Semen-Koshk	21	20	10
(Germany) Doli-Schro	18	21	15
(Mexico) Ontiv-Virge	21	11	10

Final
(Poland) Kadzi-Szala	21	17	15
(Germany) Doli-Schro	15	21	12
Third place
(Russia) Semen-Koshk	21	21
(Mexico) Ontiv-Virge	17	15
