= Samantha Mills =

Australian diver (born 1992)

Personal information
- Born: 23 February 1992 (age 34) Port Noarlunga, South Australia

Sport
- Country: Australia
Medal record
Women's Diving
Representing Australia
World Championships
Bronze medal – third place	2015 Kazan	3m synchronized
Universiade
Gold medal – first place	2013 Kazan	1m springboard
Silver medal – second place	2013 Kazan	3m synchronized

Samantha Mills (born 23 March 1992) is an Australian diver.

Mills was a gymnast through her childhood and early teens, briefly turned to pole vaulting before switching to diving. At the 2013 Summer Universiade, she won the gold medal in the Women's 1m and teamed with Esther Qin to win the silver medal in the Women's 3m Synchronized. In December 2014, she won the Women's 3m at the Australian Diving Championships.

At the 2015 World Aquatics Championships in Kazan, Russia, she won a bronze medal in the Women's 3m Synchronised with Esther Qin.

In 2015, she is a South Australian Institute of Sport scholarship holder and coached by Michel Larouche.
