= Rowing at the 2013 Summer Universiade – Men's eight =

The men's eight competition at the 2013 Summer Universiade in Kazan took place at the Kazan Rowing Centre.

== Results ==
=== Heats ===
Heat 1

Rank	Country	Time	Notes	Rowers
1	Poland	6:05.79	F	Jureczyk, Radosz, Ablewski, Zablocki, Chrustowski, Kedzierski, Mattik, Rosolski, Martyna
2	Ukraine	6:06.07	R	Chornyi, Chumraiev, Tsurkan, Zavgorodnii, Yurchenko, Futryk, Mikhai, Radchenko, Nikulin
3	Belarus	6:19.73	R	Ilyin, Yemelyanovich, Dunko, Belaus, Vyberanets, Pashevich, Furman, Vrubleuski, Ryshkevich
4	United States	6:33.81	R	Johnson, Leutzow, Petronic, Yehlen, Letten, Wilhelm, Latham, Colander, Leonard

Heat 2

Rank	Country	Time	Notes	Rowers
1	Russia	6:17.33	F	Gritsenko, Misyutkin, Drozhzhachikh, Efremenko, I Balandin, N Balandin, Zarutskiy, Andrienko, Safonkin
2	Netherlands	6:34.57	R	van Velzen, van der Leer, Broenink, van Blokland, Lemaire, Hemminga, van Blitterswijk, Kleine Punte, Hummelink
3	Norway	6:44.35	R	Nafstad, Randberg, Hagen, Lorentzen, Banfi, Kallerud, Holager, Klingan, Sandsmark

=== Repechage ===
Rank	Country	Time	Notes	Rowers
1	Ukraine	5:50.71	F	Chornyi, Chumraiev, Tsurkan, Zavgorodnii, Yurchenko, Futryk, Mikhai, Radchenko, Nikulin
2	Belarus	5:51.68	F	Ilyin, Yemelyanovich, Dunko, Belaus, Vyberanets, Pashevich, Furman, Vrubleuski, Ryshkevich
3	United States	6:00.90	F	Johnson, Leutzow, Petronic, Yehlen, Letten, Wilhelm, Latham, Colander, Leonard
4	Netherlands	6:02.55	F	van Velzen, van der Leer, Broenink, van Blokland, Lemaire, Hemminga, van Blitterswijk, Kleine Punte, Hummelink
5	Norway	6:03.36	ELIMINATED	Nafstad, Randberg, Hagen, Lorentzen, Banfi, Kallerud, Holager, Klingan, Sandsmark

=== Finals ===
Rank	Country	Time	Rowers
1	Russia	5:47.54	
2	Ukraine	5:52.31	
3	Netherlands	5:53.55	
4	Belarus	5:57.02	
5	Poland	5:58.54	
6	United States	6:09.91	
