= Yana Martynova =

Russian swimmer

Personal information
- Full name: Yana Valeryevna Martynova
- National team: Russia
- Born: February 3, 1988 (age 38) Kazan, Russia
- Height: 1.79 m (5 ft 10 in)
- Weight: 64 kg (141 lb)

Sport
- Sport: Swimming
- Strokes: Medley
Medal record
Women's swimming
Representing Russia
World Championships
Silver medal – second place	2007 Melbourne	400 m medley
European Championships
Bronze medal – third place	2008 Eindhoven	400 m medley
Universiade
Gold medal – first place	2013 Kazan	400 m medley
Bronze medal – third place	2013 Kazan	200 m butterfly

Yana Valeryevna Martynova (Russian: Яна Валерьевна Мартынова; born 3 February 1988, in Kazan) is a Russian swimmer who competes in the Women's 400m individual medley. At the 2004 Summer Olympics she competed in the women's 400 m individual medley, finishing in 21st place. At the 2008 Olympics, she competed in the 400 m individual medley and the 200 m butterfly. She reached the final of the 400 m individual medley. At the 2012 Summer Olympics she finished 24th overall in the heats in the Women's 400 metre individual medley and failed to reach the final.
