= Diving at the 2013 Summer Universiade =

Diving at the XXVII Summer Universiade
- Venue: Aquatics Palace
- Dates: July 5, 2013 – July 12, 2013

Diving was contested at the 2013 Summer Universiade from July 5 to 12 at the Aquatics Palace in Kazan, Russia.

== Medal summary ==
=== Medal table ===
Rank	Nation	Gold	Silver	Bronze	Total
1	China (CHN)	8	7	3	18
2	Russia (RUS)	3	3	2	8
3	Australia (AUS)	1	1	0	2
4	United States (USA)	0	1	1	2
5	Mexico (MEX)	0	0	6	6
Totals (5 entries)		12	12	12	36

=== Men's events ===
Event	Gold	Silver	Bronze
1 metre springboard	Lin Jin; China	Qin Tian; China	Evgenii Novoselov; Russia
3 metre springboard	Evgeny Kuznetsov; Russia	Lin Jin; China	Qin Tian; China
10 metre platform	Huo Liang; China	Wu Jun; China	Victor Minibaev; Russia
Synchronized 3 metre springboard	Russia (RUS); Evgeny Kuznetsov; Ilya Zakharov	China (CHN); Lin Jin; Luo Yutong	Mexico (MEX); Yahel Castillo; Daniel Islas
Synchronized 10 metre platform	China (CHN); Huo Liang; Ying Hong	Russia (RUS); Artem Chesakov; Victor Minibaev	Mexico (MEX); Iván García; Germán Sánchez
Team	China (CHN)	Russia (RUS)	Mexico (MEX)

=== Women's events ===
Event	Gold	Silver	Bronze
1 metre springboard	Samantha Mills; Australia	Jia Dongjin; China	Wang Liting; China
3 metre springboard	Zheng Shuangxue; China	Jia Dongjin; China	Arantxa Chávez; Mexico
10 metre platform	Yulia Koltunova; Russia	Xia Yuhua; China	Chen Ni; China
Synchronized 3 metre springboard	China (CHN); Chen Ye; Zheng Shuangxue	Australia (AUS); Samantha Mills; Esther Qin	United States (USA); Meghan Houston; Laura Ryan
Synchronized 10 metre platform	China (CHN); Chen Ni; Xia Yuhua	Russia (RUS); Natalia Goncharova; Yulia Koltunova	Mexico (MEX); Marisa Díaz; Paola Espinosa
Team	China (CHN)	United States (USA)	Mexico (MEX)
