= Will Sheehey =

American basketball player (born 1992)

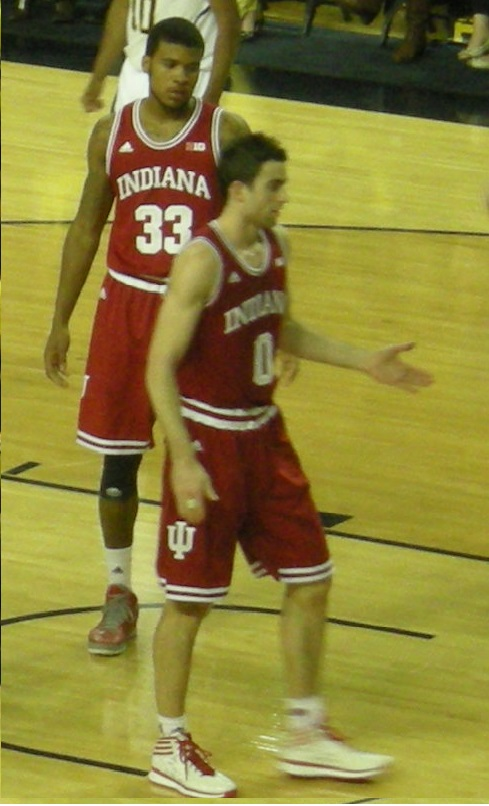
- Sheehey (0) with Indiana in 2014

New York Liberty
- Title: Assistant coach
- League: WNBA

Personal information
- Born: January 16, 1992 (age 34) Stuart, Florida, U.S.
- Listed height: 6 ft 7 in (2.01 m)
- Listed weight: 200 lb (91 kg)

Career information
- High school: South Fork (Stuart, Florida); Sagemont (Weston, Florida)
- College: Indiana (2010–2014)
- NBA draft: 2014: undrafted
- Playing career: 2014–2020
- Position: Small forward

Career history

Playing
- 2014: Budućnost
- 2015: Fort Wayne Mad Ants
- 2015: Los Angeles D-Fenders
- 2015: Panionios
- 2015–2016: SOMB
- 2016–2017: Raptors 905
- 2017–2019: Porto
- 2019: s.Oliver Würzburg
- 2019–2020: Porto

Coaching
- 2022–2023: Golden State Warriors (player development)
- 2023–2024: Golden State Warriors (assistant)
- 2025–2026: Bakken Bears (assistant)
- 2026–present: New York Liberty (assistant)

Career highlights
- NBA D-League champion (2017); WNBA Commissioner's Cup Champion (2026); Big Ten Sixth Man of the Year (2013)

William Sheehey (born January 16, 1992) is an American basketball coach and a retired professional basketball player. He played college basketball for Indiana University. He is currently working as an assistant Coach for Bakken Bears of the Basketligaen.

== High school career ==
A resident of Stuart, Florida, Sheehey attended South Fork High School as a sophomore and junior. He spent his senior year at Sagemont School in 2009–10. During the summer, Sheehey played AAU basketball for the Florida Rams.

== College career ==
Sheehey chose to play basketball at Indiana and major in legal studies, turning down offers from Arizona State, Michigan and Georgia Tech. Of his commitment, Sheehey said, "I chose Indiana because it was the best combination of basketball, academics and social life."

=== Junior season ===
As a junior during the 2012–13 season, CBS Sports columnist Jon Rothstein said, "[...] not enough credit goes to Sheehey — a player who always seems to be around a loose ball whenever it hits the floor." That season, Sheehey was named Big Ten Sixth Man of the Year.

=== Senior season ===
As a senior during the 2013–14 season, Sheehey earned Big Ten All-Sportsmanship Team honors and was named to the Reese's NCAA D1 All-Star Game. In 31 games, he averaged 11.4 points, 4.0 rebounds and 1.8 assists per game.

=== College statistics ===
Year	Team	GP	GS	MPG	FG%	3P%	FT%	RPG	APG	SPG	BPG	PPG
2010–11	Indiana	32	7	13.8	.484	.304	.649	2.1	0.4	0.4	0.2	4.8
2011–12	Indiana	31	11	22.4	.505	.383	.704	3.1	1.1	0.5	0.2	8.6
2012–13	Indiana	36	1	22.3	.486	.346	.656	3.5	1.3	0.8	0.2	9.5
2013–14	Indiana	31	31	30.3	.472	.330	.690	4.0	1.8	0.9	0.3	11.4
Career		130	50	22.1	.486	.343	.676	3.2	1.1	0.7	0.2	8.6

== Professional career ==
After going undrafted in the 2014 NBA draft, Sheehey joined the New York Knicks for the 2014 NBA Summer League. On August 1, 2014, he signed a one-year deal with Budućnost Podgorica of Montenegro. On December 16, 2014, he parted ways with Budućnost after appearing in nine league games and nine Eurocup games.

On January 28, 2015, Sheehey was acquired by the Fort Wayne Mad Ants of the NBA Development League. On March 6, he was waived by the Mad Ants after appearing in eight games. Six days later, he was acquired by the Los Angeles D-Fenders. On April 11, 2015, after the end of the 2014–15 D-League season, he signed with Panionios of Greece for the rest of the 2014–15 Greek League season.

In July 2015, Sheehey joined the New Orleans Pelicans for the 2015 NBA Summer League. On July 29, he signed with SO Maritime Boulogne of the French LNB Pro B.

On October 30, 2016, Sheehey was acquired by Raptors 905 of the D-League.

On August 7, 2017, Sheehey signed with FC Porto of the Liga Portuguesa de Basquetebol.

Sheehey signed with s.Oliver Würzburg of the German Basketball Bundesliga on June 17, 2019.

On December 28, 2019, he signed with Porto of the Liga Portuguesa de Basquetebol (LPB).

=== The Basketball Tournament (TBT) (2015–present) ===
In the summers of 2015, '16, and 2017, Sheehey played in The Basketball Tournament on ESPN for team Armored Athlete. He competed for the $2 million prize, and for team Armored Athlete in 2017, he averaged 9.5 points per game. Sheehey helped take team Armored Athlete in 2017 to the West Regional Championship, where they lost to Team Challenge ALS 75–63.

== Coaching career ==
Sheehey retired from playing in 2020. In September 2021 he joined the Golden State Warriors as a player development coach, and was part of the staff for the 2022 NBA Championship. On July 16, 2025, Sheehey accepted a position as assistant coach and head of player development for the Bakken Bears of the Danish Basketligaen.

== Personal ==
Sheehey married his wife, Nicole Jaderberg, in 2017. Sheehey is the son of Dawn Mailloux and Michael Sheehey, who played basketball at Syracuse and Saint Bonaventure. His uncle, Tom Sheehey, was a standout basketball player for Virginia and was drafted by the Boston Celtics and played professionally in Spain. He earned undergraduate degree from Kelley School of Business at Indiana University Bloomington.
