= Stephanie Peacock (swimmer) =

American swimmer (born 1992)

Personal information
- Nationality: United States
- Born: July 8, 1992 (age 34) Miami, Florida, U.S.

Sport
- Sport: Swimming
- Strokes: Freestyle
- Club: Swim Florida
- College team: University of North Carolina, Chapel Hill
- Coach: Robert Kennedy
Medal record
Women's swimming
Representing the United States
Event	1st	2nd	3rd
World University Games	1	1	2
Total	1	1	2
World University Games
Gold medal – first place	2013 Kazan	1500 m freestyle
Silver medal – second place	2013 Kazan	800 m freestyle
Bronze medal – third place	2011 Shenzhen	400 m freestyle
Bronze medal – third place	2015 Gwangju	10 km marathon

Stephanie Peacock (born July 8, 1992) is an American swimmer specializing in distance freestyle and open water swimming. She won a bronze medal in the 10k Open water and a gold medal in the 1500m at the 2013 World University Games. She swam at the University of North Carolina at Chapel Hill. In 2016, she was ranked eighth in the world in the 800m. In 2016, she was ranked 4th in the US in the 800m.
