= Daniel Islas Arroyo =

Mexican diver (born 1992)

Daniel Islas
Personal information
- Full name: Alejandro Daniel Islas Arroyo
- Born: 24 May 1992 (age 34) Mexico State, Mexico

Sport
- Country: Mexico
- Event(s): 10m, 10m synchro
Medal record
Summer Universiade
Bronze medal – third place	2013 Kazan	Team
Bronze medal – third place	2013 Kazan	10 m synchro
Bronze medal – third place	2015 Gwangju	3 m springboard

Alejandro Daniel Islas Arroyo (born 24 May 1992) is a Mexican diver. He competed in the individual 3 metre springboard at the 2012 Summer Olympics.

Islas trained and competed with Yahel Castillo.
