= Laura Ryan =

American diver

Personal information
- Full name: Laura Ryan
- Born: July 4, 1992 (age 33) Burnsville, Minnesota
- Home town: Elk River, Minnesota
- Height: 5 ft 5 in (1.65 m)

Sport
- Country: United States
- Event(s): 1m, 3m, 3m synchro, 10 meter platform diving
- College team: University of Georgia
- Club: Georgia Dive Club
- Partner: Meghan Houston
- Former partner: Amy Cozad
Medal record
Women's diving
Representing the United States
International diving competitions
Event / 1st / 2nd / 3rd; Summer Universiade / – / 1 / 1
Summer Universiade
Silver medal – second place	2013 Kazan	Team
Bronze medal – third place	2013 Kazan	3 m Springboard Synchro
- Updated on 1 April 2013

Laura Ryan (born July 4, 1992) is an American international diver from Elk River, Minnesota. She competes in one and three meter individual springboard diving and 10 meter platform diving as well as three meter synchronized springboard. She dove collegiately at Indiana University (IU) and the University of Georgia (UGA). At UGA she was a two-time NCAA champion.

== Diving career ==
=== Early career ===
Ryan graduated from Elk River High where she was coached by Jason Baumann. She won the Minnesota state high school championship in 2007 and was a three-time Amateur Athletic Union (AAU) national champion.

=== Collegiate career ===
Ryan began her college career at Indiana University (IU) and as a freshman during the 2010–2011 season won platform, finished second on 1-meter and third on 3-meter at the Big Ten Conference championship. As an IU sophomore the next year, she finished eighth on 3-meter and 12th on both 1-meter and platform at the NCAA Women's Swimming and Diving Championships.

For her junior year, Ryan transferred to the University of Georgia (UGA) in Athens, Georgia and trained under UGA dive coach Dan Laak. As a junior Ryan was selected as a First-Team All-SEC member after finishing first on 3-meter, third on platform and 18 on 1-meter at the SEC Championships en route to helping UGA win a fourth consecutive SEC Women's conference title. She then finished fifth on platform and 13th on 3-meter at the NCAA Women's Swimming and Diving Championships to help the UGA women win the National championship. Ryan was also selected by USA Diving for the Olympic Performance Squad, the United States Canada Cup Team and the FINA Grand Prix team. Ryan also earned a spot on the UGA Athletic Director's honor roll and was selected by the College Swimming Coaches Association of America as a First-Team Scholar All-American as a psychology major.

Before Ryan's senior season in 2013-2014, she suffered a broken kneecap that hampered her most of the season; however, she rebounded with a first-place finish in 3-meter and platform and a third-place finish in 1-meter to help UGA win its fifth consecutive Women's SEC championship. At the NCAA Championships, she won individual championships in both the 1 meter and 3 meter springboard events and finished third in the 10 meter platform event as UGA won a second consecutive Women's team national championship. Academically, Ryan was selected for the UGA Student-Athlete Leadership Academy, the Ramsey Scholarship for Academic/Athletic Excellence, the UGA Athletic Director's Honor Roll and the Dean's List.

=== International career ===
In 2013, Ryan teamed with Meghan Houston to win the bronze medal in women's synchronized 3-meter at the World University Games in Kazan, Russia, and Ryan also won silver in the team competition. The 2014 season marks Ryan's fifth consecutive year as a member of the United States national diving team (2010 - 2014). Ryan has also qualified for the 19th FINA Diving World Cup that will take place in Shanghai in 2014.

== See also ==
- Georgia Bulldogs
