= Azerbaijan at the 2013 Summer Universiade =

- IOC code: AZE
- NOC: Azerbaijan Olympic Committee
- Website: www.noc-aze.org

in Kazan
- Competitors: 88 in 10 sports
- Flag bearer: Nijat Rahimov
- Medals Ranked 15th: Gold 4 Silver 5 Bronze 7 Total 16

Summer Universiade appearances (overview)
- 1995; 1997; 1999; 2001; 2003; 2005; 2007; 2009; 2011; 2013; 2015; 2017; 2019; 2021

Azerbaijan competed at the 2013 Summer Universiade in Kazan, Russia from 6 July to 17 July 2013. 88 athletes are a part of the Azerbaijan team. The flagbearer of the team on the opening ceremony was the winner of the 2010 Summer Youth Olympics, weightlifter Nijat Rahimov.

Azerbaijan won 16 medals, including 4 gold medals.
