= Natalia Vieru =

Moldavian-born Russian basketball player

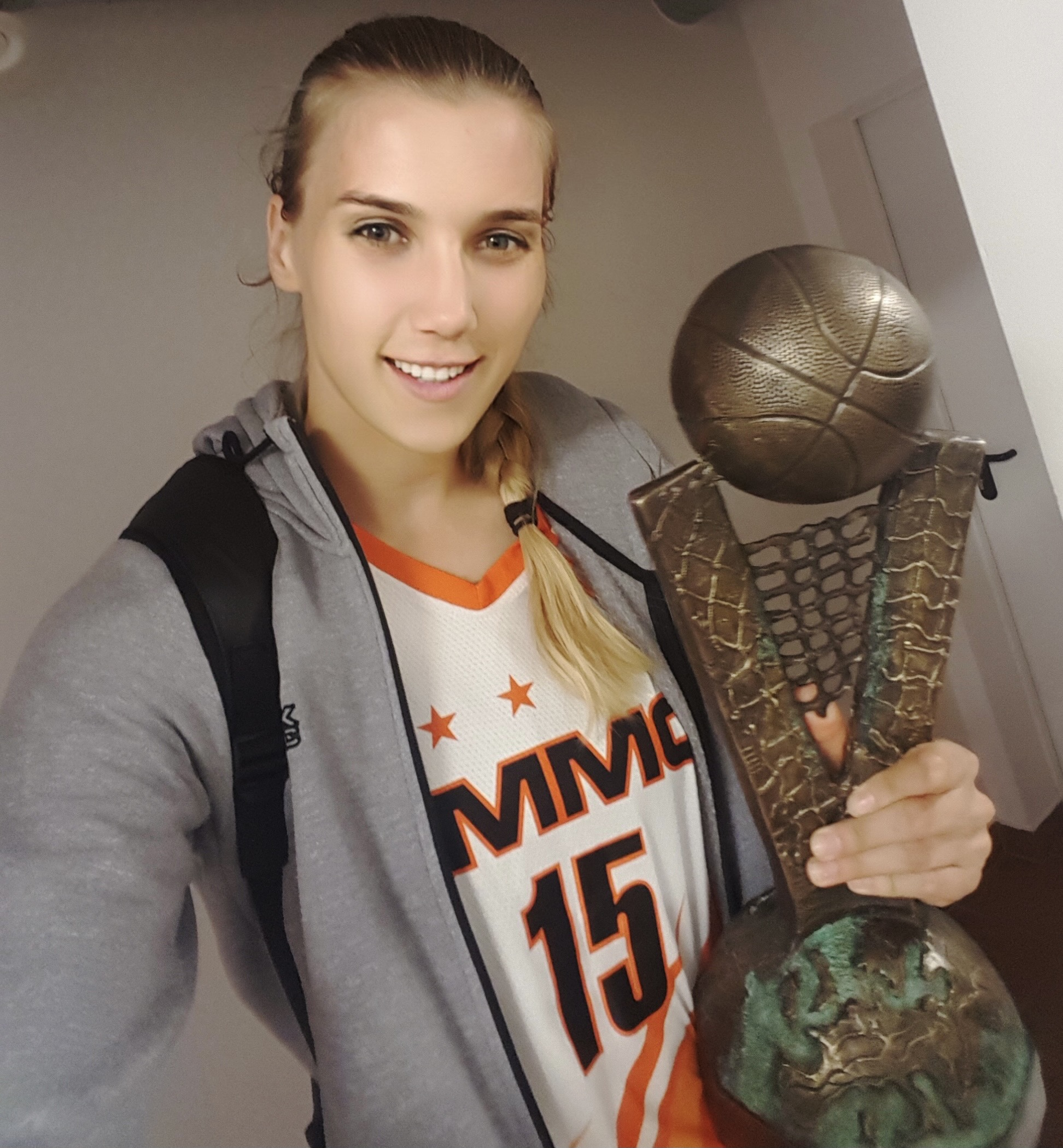
- Vieru in 2018

Personal information
- Born: 25 July 1989 (age 37) Chișinău, Moldova
- Listed height: 200 cm (6 ft 7 in)
- Listed weight: 85 kg (187 lb)

Career information
- Playing career: 2006–2020
- Position: Center

Career history
- 2005–07: Dynamo 2 Kursk
- 2007–11: Sparta&K M.R. Vidnoje
- 2011–12: Good Angels Košice
- 2012–14: Sparta&K M.R. Vidnoje
- 2014–2015: Nadezhda Orenburg
- 2015–2020: UMMC Ekaterinburg
Medals
Representing Russia
Basketball
FIBA U20 European Championship Women
| Gold medal – first place | 2008 FIBA U20 European Championship Women, | Team |
FIBA U20 European Championship Women
| Bronze medal – third place | 2007 FIBA U18 European Championship Women, | Team |

Natalia Stanislavovna Vieru (Russian: Наталья Станиславовна Виеру; born 25 July 1989) is a Russian former basketball player. She is a member of the Russia women's national basketball team and competed in the 2012 Summer Olympics. Vieru played last for the Russian club UMMC Ekaterinburg as a center from 2015 to 2020.

With six 1st places in the EuroLeague Women Championship, Vieru is tied with Diana Taurasi as the player holding the most Euroleague Women titles (2019, 2018, 2016 - UMMC; 2010, 2009, 2008 - Sparta&K M.R. Vidnoje).

== National team ==
At a height of 2 m (6 ft 7 in) Vieru was the tallest player in the Russian national team in 2018 and 2019. She placed fourth at the 2012 Olympics playing with the Russian team.

== Main Achievements ==
1st place – EuroLeague Women (2008, 2009, 2010, 2016, 2018, 2019)
1st place – Women SuperCup (2009, 2010, 2016, 2018)
1st place – Championship of Russia (2008, 2016, 2017, 2018, 2019)
2nd place – Championship of Russia (2009, 2010, 2011, 2013, 2015)
1st place – Russian Cup (2015, 2016, 2018)
4th place - Olympic games London (2012)
1st place – UMMC Cup (2015, 2016)
1st place – Championship of Slovakia (2012)
1st place – Cup of Slovakia (2012)
1st place – U20 European Championship Women (2008)
3rd place – U18 European Championship Women (2007)
MVP Championship of Slovakia (2012)
3x Best Russian Young Basketball Player (2007, 2008, 2009)
MVP U20 European Championship Women (2008)
