= Hungary at the 2013 Summer Universiade =

- IOC code: HUN

in Kazan
- Competitors: 130
- Medals Ranked 18th: Gold 4 Silver 2 Bronze 9 Total 15

Summer Universiade appearances
- 1959; 1961; 1963; 1965; 1967; 1970; 1973; 1975; 1977; 1979; 1981; 1983; 1985; 1987; 1989; 1991; 1993; 1995; 1997; 1999; 2001; 2003; 2005; 2007; 2009; 2011; 2013; 2015; 2017; 2019; 2021; 2025; 2027

At the 2013 Summer Universiade Hungary scored a total of 15 medals: 4 gold, 2 silver and 9 bronze.

== Athletics ==
Key

- Note – Ranks given for track events are within the athlete's heat only
- Q = Qualified for the next round
- q = Qualified for the next round as a fastest loser or, in field events, by position without achieving the qualifying target
- SB = Season best (for that athlete)
- N/A = Round not applicable for the event

=== Men ===
Track & road events

Athlete	Event	Heat		Quarterfinal		Semifinal		Final	
Athlete	Event	Result	Rank	Result	Rank	Result	Rank	Result	Rank
Emanuel Gutema	800 m	1:53.46	1 Q	—N/a		1:51.09	5	did not advance	
Tibor Koroknai	400 m hurdles	51.02 SB	3 Q	—N/a		50.61 SB	4	did not advance	

=== Women ===
Field events

Athlete	Event	Qualification		Final	
Athlete	Event	Distance	Position	Distance	Position
Barbara Szabó	High Jump	1.84	4 q	1.80	=10
Anita Márton	Shot Put	17.45	2 Q	17.92	4
Jenny Ozorai	Hammer Throw	—N/a		58.04	13

Combined events – Heptathlon

Athlete	Event	100H	HJ	SP	200 m	LJ	JT	800 m	Final	Rank
Györgyi Zsivoczky-Farkas	Result	13.97	1.83	13.60	25.43	6.32	49.23	2:17.26	6269	3rd place, bronze medalist(s)
Györgyi Zsivoczky-Farkas	Points	983	1016	767	848	949	845	861	6269	3rd place, bronze medalist(s)

== Badminton ==
Hungary did not compete in Badminton.

== Chess ==
=== Women Individual ===
Competitor	Round	Round 1	Round 2	Round 3	Round 4	Round 5	Round 6	Round 7	Round 8	Round 9	Points (overall)	Rank
Eszter Dudas	Result	Win	Loss	Win	Loss	Win	Loss	Loss	Win	Win	5	30
Eszter Dudas	Points	1	0	1	0	1	0	0	1	1	5	30
