= Germany at the 2013 Summer Universiade =

- IOC code: GER

in Kazan
- Competitors: 154
- Medals Ranked 14th: Gold 4 Silver 6 Bronze 9 Total 19

Summer Universiade appearances
- 1959; 1961; 1963; 1965; 1967; 1970; 1973; 1975; 1977; 1979; 1981; 1983; 1985; 1987; 1989; 1991; 1993; 1995; 1997; 1999; 2001; 2003; 2005; 2007; 2009; 2011; 2013; 2015; 2017; 2019; 2021; 2025; 2027

Germany is competing at the 2013 Summer Universiade in Kazan, Russia from 6 July to 17 July 2013. 154 athletes are a part of the German team.

Germany has won 19 medals, including 4 gold medals.
