= Brazil at the 2013 Summer Universiade =

- IOC code: BRA
- NOC: Brazilian University Sports Confederation
- Website: www.cbdu.org.br

in Kazan
- Competitors: 225 in 22 sports
- Medals Ranked 17th: Gold 4 Silver 3 Bronze 4 Total 11

Summer Universiade appearances (overview)
- 1959; 1961; 1963; 1965; 1967; 1970; 1973; 1975; 1977; 1979; 1981; 1983; 1985; 1987; 1989; 1991; 1993; 1995; 1997; 1999; 2001; 2003; 2005; 2007; 2009; 2011; 2013; 2015; 2017; 2019; 2021; 2025; 2027

Brazil sent a team of 225 athletes to compete in the 2013 Summer Universiade held in Kazan, Russia from July 6 to 17, 2013.

== Medalists ==
Medal	Name	Sport	Event	Date
Gold	Rochele Nunes	Judo	Women's heavyweight	7 July
Gold	Ketleyn Quadros	Judo	Women's lightweight	9 July
Gold	Arthur Zanetti	Gymnastics	Men's rings	10 July
Gold	Ronald Julião	Athletics	Men's discus throw	12 July
Silver	Anderson Henriques	Athletics	Men's 400 metre	9 July
Bronze	Rafael Buzacarini	Judo	Men's light heavyweight	7 July
Bronze	Team	Football	Women's football	15 July

Medals by sport
Sport	1st place, gold medalist(s)	2nd place, silver medalist(s)	3rd place, bronze medalist(s)	Total
Judo	2	0	1	3
Athletics	1	1	0	2
Gymnastics	1	0	0	1
Football	0	0	1	1
Total	4	1	2	7

== Athletics ==
Men
Track & road events

Athlete	Event	Heat		Semifinal		Final	
Athlete	Event	Result	Rank	Result	Rank	Result	Rank
Pedro Luiz de Oliveira	200 m	DNF		did not advance			
Anderson Henriques	400 m	46.63	1 Q	45.96	2 Q	45.50	Silver
Pedro Luiz de Oliveira	400 m	46.69	1 Q	46.17	2 Q	45.96	6
Jean Ferrugem	1500 m	3:58.52	18	did not advance			

Field events

Athlete	Event	Qualification		Final	
Athlete	Event	Distance	Position	Distance	Position
Ronald Julião	Discus throw	61.49 Q	3	63.54	Gold
Ronald Julião	Shot put	17.89	12 q	17.47	11

Women
Field events

Athlete	Event	Qualification		Final	
Athlete	Event	Distance	Position	Distance	Position
Eliane Martins	Long jump	5.97	17	did not advance	

Key

- Note–Ranks given for track events are within the athlete's heat only
- Q = Qualified for the next round
- q = Qualified for the next round as a fastest loser or, in field events, by position without achieving the qualifying target
- NR = National record
- N/A = Round not applicable for the event
- Bye = Athlete not required to compete in round
- NM = No mark

== Badminton ==
=== Men ===
Athlete	Event	Round of 128	Round of 64	Round of 32	Round of 16	Quarterfinals	Semifinals	Final	
Athlete	Event	Opposition Score	Opposition Score	Opposition Score	Opposition Score	Opposition Score	Opposition Score	Opposition Score	Rank
Alex Tjong	Men's singles	BYE	Metra (LAT); W 21-14, 21-9	Zulkarnain (MAS); L 18-21, 15-21	did not advance				
Alex Tjong; Hugo Arthuso	Men's doubles	Charron/Gaumond (CAN); W 17-21, 24-22, 21-14	Gao/Tian (CHN); W 21-16, 21-13	Heinz/Schwenger (GER); L 16-21, 17-21	did not advance				

=== Women ===
Athlete	Event	Round of 64	Round of 32	Round of 16	Quarterfinals	Semifinals	Final	
Athlete	Event	Opposition Score	Opposition Score	Opposition Score	Opposition Score	Opposition Score	Opposition Score	Rank
Ana Campos	Women's singles	Kwok (AUS); L 26-28, 6-21	did not advance					
Fabiana Silva	Women's singles	BYE	Deprez (GER); L 19-21, 13-21	did not advance				
Ana Campos; Fabiana Silva	Women's doubles	—N/a	Lai/Yang (MAS); L 11-21, 9-21	did not advance				

=== Mixed ===
Athlete	Event	Round of 64	Round of 32	Round of 16	Quarterfinals	Semifinals	Final	
Athlete	Event	Opposition Score	Opposition Score	Opposition Score	Opposition Score	Opposition Score	Opposition Score	Rank
Alex Tjong; Ana Campos	Mixed doubles	Oktaviani Adriana/Pratama (INA); L 13-21, 15-21	did not advance					
Fabiana Silva; Hugo Arthuso	Mixed doubles	Hirai/Saito (JPN); L 11-21, 13-21	did not advance					

Athlete	Event	Group Stage			Quarterfinal	Semifinal	Final / BM	
Athlete	Event	Opposition Score	Opposition Score	Rank	Opposition Score	Opposition Score	Opposition Score	Rank
Alex Tjong; Ana Campos; Fabiana Silva; Hugo Arthuso	Mixed team	(Thailand) THA; L 0–5	(Malaysia) MAS; L 0–5	3	(Canada) CAN; L 2–3	did not advance		

== Basketball ==
Both Brazil's men and women basketball teams are qualified for the events.

=== Men's tournament ===
Group D

Team	Pld	W	L	PF	PA	PD	Pts
Lithuania	5	5	0	486	294	+192	10
Brazil	5	4	1	434	294	+140	9
Finland	5	3	2	340	316	+24	8
Norway	5	2	3	341	353	−12	7
China	5	1	4	349	510	−161	6
Chile	5	0	5	266	449	−183	5

7 July 2013
12:30

Report

Brazil	107–65	China
Scoring by quarter: 24–17, 26–15, 26–16, 31–17

Miras Sports Complex

8 July 2013
12:30

Report

Finland	65–75	Brazil
Scoring by quarter: 15–16, 13–23, 20–20, 17–16

Olymp Sport Hall

10 July 2013
10:00

Report

Brazil	106–40	Chile
Scoring by quarter: 27–11, 25–9, 26–3, 28–17

Basket Hall

11 July 2013
12:30

Report

Lithuania	77–69	Brazil
Scoring by quarter: 22–16, 19–14, 16–18, 20–21

Miras Sports Complex

12 July 2013
20:30

Report

Brazil	77–47	Norway
Scoring by quarter: 18–14, 23–15, 20–10, 16–8

Olymp Sport Hall

Quarterfinals

14 July 2013
18:00

Report

Canada	88–77	Brazil
Scoring by quarter: 17–20, 21–17, 21–15, 29–25
Pts: Heslip 20; Rebs: Powell, Klassen 6 Asts: Pangos, P. Scrubb 4		Pts: Silva 15; Rebs: Deodato 6 Asts: three players 4

Miras Sports Complex
Attendance: 537
Referees: Mindaugas Vecherskis (LTU), Thomas Short (USA), Yrjo Johannes Sarekoski (FIN)

5th–8th place

15 July 2013
18:00

Report

Romania	82–75	Brazil
Scoring by quarter: 26–23, 13–13, 16–16, 27–23

Miras Sports Complex

7th place game

16 July 2013
10:30

Report

Brazil	63–67	Estonia
Scoring by quarter: 22–21, 11–13, 21–16, 9–17

Basket Hall

=== Women's tournament ===
Group B

Team	Pld	W	L	PF	PA	PD	Pts
United States	3	3	0	326	168	+158	6
Czech Republic	3	2	1	206	208	−2	5
Brazil	3	1	2	216	242	−26	4
Mali	3	0	3	127	257	−130	3

8 July 2013
18:00

Report

Brazil	63–86	Czech Republic
Scoring by quarter: 23–30, 14–17, 7–24, 19–15

Olymp Sport Hall

9 July 2013
18:00

Report

Brazil	78–51	Mali
Scoring by quarter: 19–12, 14–14, 26–10, 19–15

Miras Sports Complex

10 July 2013
12:30

Report

United States	105–75	Brazil
Scoring by quarter: 36–16, 20–16, 26–19, 23–24

Miras Sports Complex

9th–16th place

12 July 2013
20:30

Report

Brazil	94–46	Mongolia
Scoring by quarter: 22–8, 25–6, 23–15, 24–17

Biek Tau Sports Complex

9th–12th place

13 July 2013
20:30

Report

Ukraine	76–66	Brazil
Scoring by quarter: 22–6, 23–28, 23–15, 8–17

Miras Sports Complex

11th place game

15 July 2013
10:00

Report

Poland	73–59	Brazil
Scoring by quarter: 18–18, 16–17, 19–10, 20–14

Olymp Sport Hall

== Diving ==
Men

Athlete	Event	Preliminaries		Semifinals		Final	
Athlete	Event	Points	Rank	Points	Rank	Points	Rank
Ian Matos	1 m springboard	248,75	23	did not advance			

== Fencing ==
Men

Athlete	Event	Round of 128	Round of 64	Round of 32	Round of 16	Quarterfinal	Semifinal	Final / BM	
Athlete	Event	Opposition Score	Opposition Score	Opposition Score	Opposition Score	Opposition Score	Opposition Score	Opposition Score	Rank
Nicolas Ferreira	Individual épée	Ng (SIN); W 15–3	Avdeev (RUS); W 15–13	Kim (KOR); L 15–10	did not advance				
Renzo Agresta	Individual sabre	BYE	Hamar (HUN); L 7–15	did not advance					

Women

Athlete	Event	Round of 128	Round of 64	Round of 32	Round of 16	Quarterfinal	Semifinal	Final / BM	
Athlete	Event	Opposition Score	Opposition Score	Opposition Score	Opposition Score	Opposition Score	Opposition Score	Opposition Score	Rank
Amanda Simeão	Individual épée	BYE	Alibekova (KAZ); W 15–6	Kirpu (EST); L 15–11	did not advance				

== Football ==
Both Brazil's men and women football teams are qualified for the events.

=== Men's tournament ===
Pool D

Team	Pld	W	D	L	GF	GA	GD	Pts
France	3	1	2	0	5	2	+3	5
Canada	3	1	2	0	5	3	+2	5
Brazil	3	1	2	0	2	1	+1	5
Peru	3	0	0	3	0	6	−6	0

5 July 2013
14:00

Brazil	1–0	Peru
Berger 68'	Report

Olymp Stadium
Referee: Vladimir Kazmenko (Russia)

8 July 2013
20:00

Brazil	0–0	France
	Report

Olymp Stadium
Referee: Chang Chih (Chinese Taipei)

10 July 2013
20:00

Brazil	1–1	Canada
Berger 38'	Report	Murphy 59' (pen.)

Olymp Stadium
Referee: Antonio Damato (Italy)

9th–16th place

12 July 2013
20:00

Brazil	1–4	China
Franci 4'	Report	Li Xun 35', 82'; Hu Ming 49'; Han Guanghu 84'

Raketa Stadium
Referee: Eiko Saar (Estonia)

13th place game

16 July 2013
14:00

Turkey	4–2	Brazil
Yıldırım 13'; Çakır 24'; Alaeddinnoğlu 44'; Osmanoğlu 89'	Report	Berger 16' (pen.); Paixão 46'

Olymp Stadium
Referee: Tan Hai (China)

=== Women's tournament ===
Pool C

Team	Pld	W	D	L	GF	GA	GD	Pts
Japan	3	2	0	1	9	2	+7	6
Great Britain	3	2	0	1	8	3	+5	6
Brazil	3	2	0	1	6	2	+4	6
Estonia	3	0	0	3	1	17	−16	0

Source: Kazan 2013
5 July 2013
17:00

Brazil	0–2	Great Britain
	Report	Kirby 62'; Whelan 81'

Raketa Stadium
Referee: Tarasenko (Russia)

7 July 2013
20:00

Brazil	5–0	Estonia
Pires 32'; Viegas 40'; Crilevari 55'; Demoner 67' (pen.); Sochor 77'	Report

Raketa Stadium
Referee: Sheena Marie Law (Canada)

9 July 2013
20:00

Japan	0–1	Brazil
	Report	Gabriela Demoner 20'

Olymp Stadium
Referee: O Neill (Ireland)

Quarterfinals

11 July 2013
17:00

Chinese Taipei	1–3	Brazil
Yu Hsiu-Chin 56'	Report	Demoner 37', 64'; Crilevari 87'

Rubin Stadium
Referee: Marina Mamaeva (Russia)

Semifinals

13 July 2013
20:00

Brazil	0–1	Great Britain
	Report	Carter-Loblack 65'

Rubin Stadium
Referee: Park Ji-Yeong (Korea Republic)

Bronze medal match

15 July 2013
16:00

Brazil	2–1	South Africa
Travalão 67', 69'	Report	Seoposenwe 34'

Rubin Stadium
Referee: Marina Mamaeva (Russia)

== Gymnastics ==
=== Artistic ===
==== Men ====
Team

Athlete	Event	Final							
Athlete	Event	Apparatus						Total	Rank
Athlete	Event	F	PH	R	V	PB	HB	Total	Rank
Lucas Bitencourt	Team	—N/a	13,550 (49)	13,850 (50)	—N/a	14,550 (26)	13,900 (32)	55,850 (59)	5
Francisco Barretto	Team	14,350 (21)	14,450 (18)	14,350 (26)	13,000 (88)	13,750 (53)	14,350 (16)	84,250 (16)	5
Péricles da Silva	Team	—N/a	15,100 (6)	—N/a	13,500 (75)	14,500 (29)	13,650 (43)	56,750 (57)	5
Arthur Mariano	Team	14,950 (10)	14,400 (22)	13,800 (52)	13,500 (75)	14,550 (25)	15,100 (5)	86,300 (8)	5
Arthur Zanetti	Team	14,600 (17)	—N/a	15,900 (1)	14,350 (31)	—N/a		44,850 (70)	5
Team Results	Team	43,900 (6)	43,950 (4)	44,100 (4)	41,350 (19)	43,600 (7)	43,350 (6)	260,250	5

Individual

Athlete	Event	Qualification								Final							
Athlete	Event	Apparatus						Total	Rank	Apparatus						Total	Rank
Athlete	Event	F	PH	R	V	PB	HB	Total	Rank	F	PH	R	V	PB	HB	Total	Rank
Arthur Zanetti	Rings	—N/a		15,900	—N/a			15,900	1	—N/a			—N/a				1st place, gold medalist(s)

== Judo ==
=== Men ===
Athlete	Event	Round of 32	Round of 16	Quarterfinals	Semifinals	Repechage	Bronze Medal	Final	
Athlete	Event	Opposition Result	Opposition Result	Opposition Result	Opposition Result	Opposition Result	Opposition Result	Opposition Result	Rank
Luiz Revite	-66kg	Li (CHN); W 0112-0003	Dovdon (MGL); L 0001-0101	did not advance					
João Macedo	-70kg	Sedmidubsky (CZE); W 1002-0101	Mititelu (ROU); W 1011-0001	Wang (KOR); L 100-000	Did not advance	Regis (ITA); L 001-0102	did not advance		
Vinicius Panini	-81kg	Ratsimiziva (MAD); W 100-0001	Riou (FRA); L 0002-100	did not advance					
Eduardo da Silva	-90kg	Bozbayev (KAZ); W 1022-0002	Choriev (UZB); L 0001-0012	did not advance					
Rafael Buzacarini	-100kg	Toktogonov (KGZ); W 100-000	Gaballa (EGY); W 1102-0002	Kurbonov (UZB); W 0002-000	Makhmadov (RUS); L 0011-0012	BYE	Minashkin (EST); W 0003-0002	Did not advance	Bronze
David Silva	+100kg	Tahirov (AZE); W 1001-0001	Nikiforenko (LAT); W 100-0003	Sarnacki (POL); L 100-000	Did not advance	Koleśnyk (UKR); W 1112-0001; Saidov (RUS); L 0001-100	did not advance		

=== Women ===
Athlete	Event	Round of 32	Round of 16	Quarterfinals	Semifinals	Repechage	Bronze Medal	Final	
Athlete	Event	Opposition Result	Opposition Result	Opposition Result	Opposition Result	Opposition Result	Opposition Result	Opposition Result	Rank
Raquel Silva	-52kg	BYE	Kim (KOR); L 010-100	did not advance					
Ketleyn Quadros	-57kg	BYE	Perenc (POL); W 0102-0001	Amaron (SUI); W 1002-000H	Kim (KOR); W 1001-0001	BYE		Hevondian (UKR); W 1121-0001	Gold
Mariana Silva	-63kg	BYE	Ahrens (GER); L 1022-000	did not advance					
Barbara Timo	-70kg	BYE	Andriievska (UKR); W 100-0001	Bandel (GER); L 0002-0001	Did not advance	Hwang (KOR); L 0003-0002	did not advance		
Rochele Nunes	+78kg	BYE	Kim (KOR); W 1012-0001	Mbairo (FRA); W 100-000	Slutskaya (BLR); W 100-0001	BYE		Ortiz Bocourt (CUB); W 0013-0002	Gold

== Rowing ==
Men

Athlete	Event	Heats		Repechage		Final	
Athlete	Event	Time	Rank	Time	Rank	Time	Rank
Gabriel Moraes; Arthur Paula	Coxless pair	7:25.49	4 R	7:05.96	2 QF	7:24.36	5

Men

Athlete	Event	Heats		Repechage		Semifinal		Final	
Athlete	Event	Time	Rank	Time	Rank	Time	Rank	Time	Rank
Ana Pallasao	Lightweight single sculls	8:27.83	4 R	9:27.83	1 QF	8:21.18	5 FB	8:33.76	9

== Rugby sevens ==
=== Men ===
Group D

Team	GP	W	D	L	PF	PA	PD	Pts
France	3	3	0	0	79	24	+55	9
Italy	3	2	0	1	48	48	+0	7
Brazil	3	1	0	2	29	65	−36	5
Romania	3	0	0	3	31	50	−19	3

14 July 2013
13:02

Romania	7–17	Brazil
	Report

Tulpar Stadium

14 July 2013
18:32

France	36–0	Brazil
	Report

Tulpar Stadium

15 July 2013
12:34

Italy	22–12	Brazil
	Report

Tulpar Stadium

=== Women ===
Group B

Team	GP	W	D	L	PF	PA	PD	Pts
Great Britain								
Italy								
Brazil								
United States								
China								

14 July 2013
10:06

Brazil	v	United States

Tulpar Stadium

14 July 2013
17:26

Brazil	v	China

Tulpar Stadium

15 July 2013
10:44

Great Britain	v	Brazil

Tulpar Stadium

15 July 2013
14:02

Italy	v	Brazil

Tulpar Stadium

== Tennis ==
Men

Athlete	Event	Round of 128	Round of 64	Round of 32	Round of 16	Quarterfinals	Semifinals	Final / BM	
Athlete	Event	Opposition Score	Opposition Score	Opposition Score	Opposition Score	Opposition Score	Opposition Score	Opposition Score	Rank
João Wiesinger	Singles	Bye	A Al-Mahruqi (OMA); W 6-0, 6-0	P Filin (BLR)					
Augusto Meirelles	Singles	Bye	J Al-Marri (QAT); W 6-0, 6-0	E Gerasimov (BLR)					
João Wiesinger; Augusto Meirelles	Doubles	—N/a		MF Said/SMA Syed (MAS); L 4-6, 6-7^{(4–7)}	did not advance				

Women

Athlete	Event	Round of 128	Round of 64	Round of 32	Round of 16	Quarterfinals	Semifinals	Final / BM	
Athlete	Event	Opposition Score	Opposition Score	Opposition Score	Opposition Score	Opposition Score	Opposition Score	Opposition Score	Rank
Fernanda Chiaparini	Singles	M Dimingo (ZAM); W 6-1, 6-0	K Vaňková (CZE); L 0-6, 1-6	did not advance					
Fabiana Chiaparini	Singles	S Santamaria (USA); L 1-6, 0-6	did not advance						
Fernanda Chiaparini; Fabiana Chiaparini	Doubles	—N/a		CE Rustscheff/K Sanjevic (CAN)					

Mixed

Athlete	Event	Round of 32	Round of 16	Quarterfinals	Semifinals	Final / BM	
Athlete	Event	Opposition Score	Opposition Score	Opposition Score	Opposition Score	Opposition Score	Rank
João Wiesinger; Fabiana Chiaparini	Doubles	J-s Nam/M-h Yu (KOR)					

== Volleyball ==
Brazil has qualified both teams for the competition.

=== Men ===
Group C

Pos	Team	Pld	W	L	Pts	SW	SL	SR	SPW	SPL	SPR	Qualification
1	Poland	5	5	0	14	15	2	7.500	412	290	1.421	Quarterfinals
2	Brazil	5	4	1	12	12	5	2.400	415	330	1.258	Quarterfinals
3	Switzerland	5	3	2	8	10	9	1.111	425	393	1.081	9th–16th place
4	Australia	5	2	3	8	11	9	1.222	431	422	1.021	9th–16th place
5	China	5	1	4	3	4	13	0.308	324	397	0.816	17th–21st place
6	Macau	5	0	5	0	1	15	0.067	219	394	0.556	17th–21st place

Date	Time		Score		Set 1	Set 2	Set 3	Set 4	Set 5	Total	Report
6 July	10:00	Macau	0–3	Brazil	10–25	11–25	16–25			37–75	P2P3
7 July	14:00	Brazil	3–0	China	25–15	25–16	25–18			75–49	
8 July	12:00	Australia	1–3	Brazil	17–25	26–28	28–26	13–25		84–104	
10 July	12:00	Brazil		Switzerland							
11 July	17:00	Poland		Brazil							

=== Woman ===
Group B

Pos	Team	Pld	W	L	Pts	SW	SL	SR	SPW	SPL	SPR	Qualification
1	Brazil	2	2	0	6	6	0	MAX	150	91	1.648	Quarterfinals
2	Canada	2	1	1	3	3	3	1.000	118	129	0.915	Quarterfinals
3	Norway	2	0	2	0	0	6	0.000	102	150	0.680	9th–15th place

Date		Score		Set 1	Set 2	Set 3	Set 4	Set 5	Total
9 July	Norway		Brazil						
10 July	Brazil		Canada						

== Waterpolo ==
=== Men ===
Group B

Team	GP	W	D	L	GF	GA	GD	Pts
Italy	5	4	0	1	63	37	+26	8
Serbia	5	4	0	1	61	28	+33	8
United States	5	2	1	2	47	34	+13	5
Brazil	5	2	1	2	52	42	+10	5
Montenegro	5	2	0	3	56	39	+17	4
Belgium	5	0	0	5	13	112	–99	0

5 July 2013; 12:30	Report	United States	8–8	Brazil	Burevestnik Swimming Pool; Referees: David (FRA), Tahara (JPN)
5 July 2013; 12:30	Report	Score by quarters: 2–2, 3–3, 1–1, 2–2			Burevestnik Swimming Pool; Referees: David (FRA), Tahara (JPN)
5 July 2013; 12:30	Report	Reynolds 2	Goals	Baches Delgado 3	Burevestnik Swimming Pool; Referees: David (FRA), Tahara (JPN)

7 July 2013; 14:00	Report	Brazil	19–3	Belgium	Burevestnik Swimming Pool; Referees: Shimizu (JPN), Gerzanich (RUS)
7 July 2013; 14:00	Report	Score by quarters: 4–1, 3–0, 5–1, 7–1			Burevestnik Swimming Pool; Referees: Shimizu (JPN), Gerzanich (RUS)
7 July 2013; 14:00	Report	Guimarães 5	Goals	Poelmans 2	Burevestnik Swimming Pool; Referees: Shimizu (JPN), Gerzanich (RUS)

8 July 2013; 15:30	Report	Italy	11–10	Brazil	Burevestnik Swimming Pool; Referees: Franulovic (CRO), Gerzanich (RUS)
8 July 2013; 15:30	Report	Score by quarters: 4–1, 1–1, 3–4, 3–4			Burevestnik Swimming Pool; Referees: Franulovic (CRO), Gerzanich (RUS)
8 July 2013; 15:30	Report	Luongo 4	Goals	Baches Delgado 4	Burevestnik Swimming Pool; Referees: Franulovic (CRO), Gerzanich (RUS)

10 July 2013; 12:30	Report	Serbia	14–8	Brazil	Burevestnik Swimming Pool; Referees: Tahara (JPN), Deslieres (CAN)
10 July 2013; 12:30	Report	Score by quarters: 3–2, 5–2, 2–2, 4–2			Burevestnik Swimming Pool; Referees: Tahara (JPN), Deslieres (CAN)
10 July 2013; 12:30	Report	Rackov, Vuksanović 3	Goals	Baches Delgado 2	Burevestnik Swimming Pool; Referees: Tahara (JPN), Deslieres (CAN)

11 July 2013; 14:00	Report	Brazil	7–6	Montenegro	Burevestnik Swimming Pool; Referees: Mebuke (GEO), Szekely (HUN)
11 July 2013; 14:00	Report	Score by quarters: 2–2, 3–2, 1–2, 1–0			Burevestnik Swimming Pool; Referees: Mebuke (GEO), Szekely (HUN)
11 July 2013; 14:00	Report	Baches Delgado 4	Goals	Šarić 3	Burevestnik Swimming Pool; Referees: Mebuke (GEO), Szekely (HUN)

Quarterfinals

13 July 2013; 18:30	Report	Russia	14–5	Brazil	Burevestnik Swimming Pool; Referees: Szekely (HUN), Riccitelli (ITA)
13 July 2013; 18:30	Report	Score by quarters: 5–2, 3–0, 1–2, 5–1			Burevestnik Swimming Pool; Referees: Szekely (HUN), Riccitelli (ITA)
13 July 2013; 18:30	Report	Latypov, Andrukov 3	Goals	Correa 2	Burevestnik Swimming Pool; Referees: Szekely (HUN), Riccitelli (ITA)

5th–8th place

15 July 2013; 17:00	Report	Japan	12–9	Brazil	Burevestnik Swimming Pool; Referees: Szekely (HUN), Riccitelli (ITA)
15 July 2013; 17:00	Report	Score by quarters: 2–3, 4–1, 4–3, 2–2			Burevestnik Swimming Pool; Referees: Szekely (HUN), Riccitelli (ITA)
15 July 2013; 17:00	Report	Kadono 4	Goals	three players 2	Burevestnik Swimming Pool; Referees: Szekely (HUN), Riccitelli (ITA)

7th place game

16 July 2013; 11:00	Report	Australia	8–7	Brazil	Burevestnik Swimming Pool; Referees: Bianco (ITA), Gerzanich (RUS)
16 July 2013; 11:00	Report	Score by quarters: 4–1, 2–2, 0–2, 2–2			Burevestnik Swimming Pool; Referees: Bianco (ITA), Gerzanich (RUS)
16 July 2013; 11:00	Report	Edwards 4	Goals	Coutinho, Baches Delgado 2	Burevestnik Swimming Pool; Referees: Bianco (ITA), Gerzanich (RUS)
