= Belgium at the 2013 Summer Universiade =

- IOC code: BEL

in Kazan
- Competitors: 51 in 11 sports
- Flag bearer: Jean-Yves Bottieau
- Medals: Gold 1 Silver 0 Bronze 1 Total 2

Summer Universiade appearances
- 1959; 1961; 1963; 1965; 1967; 1970; 1973; 1975; 1977; 1979; 1981; 1983; 1985; 1987; 1989; 1991; 1993; 1995; 1997; 1999; 2001; 2003; 2005; 2007; 2009; 2011; 2013; 2015; 2017; 2019; 2021; 2025; 2027

Belgium competed at the 2013 Summer Universiade in Kazan, Russia.

== Medalists ==
Medal	Name	Sport	Event
Gold	Thomas Van Der Plaetsen	Athletics	Men's Decathlon
Bronze	Fanny Smets	Athletics	Women's Pole Vault

With these results Belgium achieved the 39th place out of 162 participating countries in the medals table.

== Athletics ==
Belgium was represented by six competitors in athletics.

Men

Athlete	Events	Heat		Final	
Athlete	Events	Result	Rank	Result	Rank
Ali Hamdi	1500 metres	3:43.77	5th Q	3:44.38	10th
Dieter Vanstreels	Half marathon			Did Not Finish	

Decathlon

Event	Thomas Van Der Plaetsen		
Event	Result	Points	Rank
100 m	11.12	834	3rd
Long jump	7m80	1010	1st
Shot put	13m48	697	8th
High jump	2m07	868	2nd
400 m	49.35	844	3rd
110 m hurdles	14.77	878	2nd
Discus throw	38m74	639	8th
Pole vault	5m30	1004	1st
Javelin throw	62m43	774	5th
1500 m	4:50.48	616	6th
Total		8,164	Gold medal

Women

Athlete	Events	Semifinal		Final	
Athlete	Events	Result	Rank	Result	Rank
Axelle Dauwens	400 metres hurdles	57.53	9th	Did not advance	
Chloe Henry	Pole vault			4m30	6th
Fanny Smets	Pole vault			4m30	Bronze medal

== Badminton ==
Belgium was represented by three badminton players.

=== Men ===
Athlete	Event	Round of 64	Round of 32	Round of 16	Quarterfinals	Semifinals	Final	
Athlete	Event	Opposition Score	Opposition Score	Opposition Score	Opposition Score	Opposition Score	Opposition Score	Rank
Maxime Moreels	Singles	Hong (KOR); L 2-0 (21-8, 21-18)	Did not advance					33

=== Women ===
Athlete	Event	Round of 64	Round of 32	Round of 16	Quarterfinals	Semifinals	Final	
Athlete	Event	Opposition Score	Opposition Score	Opposition Score	Opposition Score	Opposition Score	Opposition Score	Rank
Marie Demy	Singles	Suo (CHN); L 2-0 (21-12, 21-13)	Did not advance					33
Lianne Tan	Singles	Guiffre (CAN); W 2-0 (21-10, 21-8)	Dmytryshyn (UKR); W 2-0 (21-10, 21-17)	Sun (CHN); L 2-0 (21-8, 21-9)	Did not advance			9

== Boxing ==
Belgium was represented by one boxer.

Athlete	Event	Round of 16	Quarterfinals	Semifinals	Final
Athlete	Event	Opposition Score	Opposition Score	Opposition Score	Opposition Score
Dodji Ayigah	Flyweight	Aloyan (RUS); L 3-0	Did not advance		

== Fencing ==
Belgium was represented by three competitors in fencing.

Men

Athlete	Event	Round of 64	Round of 32	Round of 16	Quarterfinal	Semifinal	Final	
Athlete	Event	Opposition Score	Opposition Score	Opposition Score	Opposition Score	Opposition Score	Opposition Score	Rank
François Xavier Ferot	Individual épée	Freilich (ISR); L 9–15	Did not advance					
Hans-Joachim Lecocq	Individual foil	Kulakov (KAZ); W 15–12	Foconi (ITA); L 5–15	Did not advance				

Women

Athlete	Event	Round of 64	Round of 32	Round of 16	Quarterfinal	Semifinal	Final	
Athlete	Event	Opposition Score	Opposition Score	Opposition Score	Opposition Score	Opposition Score	Opposition Score	Rank
Delphine Groslambert	Individual foil		Dobbs (USA); W 15–12	Nishioka (JPN); L 7–15	Did not advance			

== Gymnastics ==
Belgium was represented in both artistic gymnastics and rhythmic gymnastics.

=== Artistic gymnastics ===
Two gymnasts competed in the artistic gymnastics competition.

=== Rhythmic gymnastics ===
One gymnast competed in the rhythmic gymnastics competition for Belgium.

Athlete	Event	Final					
Athlete	Event	Rope	Hoop	Ball	Ribbon	Total	Rank
Elisabeth De Leeuw	Individual	14.106	14.916	14.733	14.550	58.215	20

== Judo ==
Belgium was represented by three female and one male judoka.

== Rowing ==
Belgium was represented by two rowers.

== Rugby sevens ==
Belgium was represented by a men's team.

=== Men ===
The men's team participated in Group B.

==== Team roster ====
Name	Position
Vincent Hart	
Bram Coupé	
Victor Wartique	
Mehdi Hrim	
Guillaume Mundele	
Tom Coupé	
Betrand Billi	
George Mclachlan	
Hendrik Brouwers	
Nathan Bonthems	
Charles Reynaert	

Head coach: Nicolas Le Roux
Team manager: Monique Petitjean

==== Preliminary round ====
Team	GP	W	D	L	PF	PA	PD	Pts
Great Britain	3	3	0	0	107	12	+95	9
Belgium	3	2	0	1	71	10	+61	7
Georgia	3	1	0	2	40	69	-29	5
Malaysia	3	0	0	3	10	137	−127	3

14 July 2013
11:34

Belgium	26–0	Georgia

Tulpar Stadium

14 July 2013
15:58

Belgium	38–0	Malaysia

Tulpar Stadium

15 July 2013
14:46

Great Britain	10–7	Belgium

Tulpar Stadium

==== Quarterfinals ====
16 July 2013
11:50

South Africa	26–12	Belgium

Tulpar Stadium

==== Plate tier ====
16 July 2013
16:34

Italy	10-12	Belgium

Tulpar Stadium

17 July 2013
11:15

Belgium	19-10	Japan

Tulpar Stadium

== Table Tennis ==
Belgium was represented by three competitors in table tennis.

== Water polo ==
Belgium was represented by a men's team.

=== Men ===
The men's team participated in Group B.

==== Team roster ====
Abbreviations
Pos.	Position	№	Cap number
A	Attacker	U	Utility
D	Defender	GK	Goalkeeper

№	Name	Pos.
3	Sven Publie	
2	Greg Heirman	
8	Nick De Backer	
13	Arthur Parmentier	GK
9	Gerry Verschuren	
5	Ruben Cools	
4	Kevin Vervoort	
7	Nick Poelmans	
1	Jorden Van Doorn	GK
6	Thomas Herman	
11	Nicolas Goffin	
10	Arnaud Marenne	

Head coach: Niculae Fulgeanu
Assistant coach: Bernard Pollak

==== Preliminary round ====
Team	GP	W	D	L	GF	GA	GD	Pts
Italy	5	4	0	1	63	37	+26	8
Serbia	5	4	0	1	61	28	+33	8
United States	5	2	1	2	47	34	+13	5
Brazil	5	2	1	2	52	42	+10	5
Montenegro	5	2	0	3	56	39	+17	4
Belgium	5	0	0	5	13	112	–99	0

5 July 2013; 18:30	Italy	28–1	Belgium	Burevestnik Swimming Pool

7 July 2013; 14:00	Brazil	19–3	Belgium	Burevestnik Swimming Pool

8 July 2013; 17:00	Belgium	5–24	Montenegro	Burevestnik Swimming Pool

10 July 2013; 15:30	Report	United States	19–2	Belgium	Burevestnik Swimming Pool; Referees: Murray (CAN), Szekely (HUN)
10 July 2013; 15:30	Report	Score by quarters: 6–1, 5–0, 3–1, 5–0			Burevestnik Swimming Pool; Referees: Murray (CAN), Szekely (HUN)

11 July 2013; 12:30	Serbia	22–2	Belgium

==== Classification round ====
13 July 2013; 12:30	Georgia	7–5	Belgium

15 July 2013; 12:30	Belgium	12–15	Canada

Final rank: 12

== Weightlifting ==
Belgium was represented by one female weightlifter.

=== Women ===
Athlete	Event	Snatch		Clean & Jerk		Total	Rank
Athlete	Event	Result	Rank	Result	Rank	Total	Rank
Anna Van Bellinghen	75 kg	88	12	107	12	195	12
