= Athletics at the 2013 Summer Universiade – Men's 200 metres =

The men's 200 metres event at the 2013 Summer Universiade was held on 9–10 July.

== Medalists ==
Gold	Silver	Bronze
Anaso Jobodwana; South Africa	Rasheed Dwyer; Jamaica	Shōta Iizuka; Japan

== Results ==
=== Heats ===
Qualification: First 3 in each heat and 2 best performers advanced to the quarterfinals.

Wind:
Heat 1: -0.2 m/s, Heat 2: ? m/s, Heat 3: -0.3 m/s, Heat 4: 0.0 m/s, Heat 5: +0.5 m/s
Heat 6: +1.1 m/s, Heat 7: +0.8 m/s, Heat 8: +1.1 m/s, Heat 9: +1.1 m/s, Heat 10: +1.1 m/s

Rank	Heat	Name	Nationality	Time	Notes
1	4	Oluwasegun Makinde	Canada	20.84	Q
2	6	Rasheed Dwyer	Jamaica	21.00	Q
3	9	Gao Dongshi	China	21.01	Q
4	10	Brendon Rodney	Canada	21.06	Q
5	5	Shōta Iizuka	Japan	21.09	Q
6	6	Sibusiso Matsenjwa	Swaziland	21.10	Q
7	10	Nicholas Hough	Australia	21.16	Q
8	10	Diego Marani	Italy	21.28	Q
9	9	Aleksandr Khyutte	Russia	21.29	Q
10	4	Gideon Trotter	South Africa	21.32	Q
11	6	Yang Zhanlin	China	21.36	Q
12	5	Egidijus Dilys	Lithuania	21.37	Q
13	8	David Lima	Portugal	21.42	Q
14	8	Ramil Guliyev	Turkey	21.47	Q
15	1	Akiyuki Hashimoto	Japan	21.51	Q
16	8	Keene Motukisi	Botswana	21.55	Q
17	8	Battulgyn Achitbileg	Mongolia	21.58	q, NR
18	2	Hua Wilfried Serge Koffi	Ivory Coast	21.60	Q
19	3	Anaso Jobodwana	South Africa	21.61	Q
20	3	Jesse Uri-Khob	Namibia	21.61	Q
21	7	Emmanuel Kubi	Ghana	21.62	Q
22	7	Artur Reysbikh	Russia	21.64	Q
23	3	Lee Jae-ha	South Korea	21.64	Q
24	10	Pedro Bernardo	Portugal	21.67	q
25	5	Ruslan Perestiuk	Ukraine	21.37	Q
26	4	Mike Kalisz	Denmark	21.84	Q
27	1	Roman Turcani	Slovakia	21.89	Q
28	6	Fadlin Fadlin	Indonesia	21.93	
29	2	Kamil Kryński	Poland	21.96	Q
30	2	Nyasha Charandura	Zimbabwe	21.99	Q
31	3	Jaran Sathoengram	Thailand	22.00	
32	1	Mak Shing Hei	Hong Kong	22.01	Q
33	6	Žilvinas Adomavičius	Lithuania	22.05	
34	9	Anders Erlend Idaas	Norway	22.05	Q
35	6	LeSean Noel	Trinidad and Tobago	22.05	
36	10	Kasper Olsen	Denmark	22.09	PB
37	8	Mailk Ibrahim	Ghana	22.12	
38	1	Daham Agampodi	Sri Lanka	22.17	
39	2	Rauno Kunnapuu	Estonia	22.22	
40	4	Rodolfo Edmond Taylor	Panama	22.22	
41	3	Davron Atabaev	Tajikistan	22.25	
42	6	Doruk Uğurer	Turkey	22.32	
43	7	Moulaye Sonko	Senegal	22.38	Q
44	3	Enrique Polanco	Chile	22.38	
45	4	Salah Al-Ajmi	Oman	22.59	
46	5	Ramzi Naim	Lebanon	22.60	
47	1	Leong Wang Kuong	Macau	22.78	
48	9	Zafar Hayyat	Pakistan	22.81	
49	2	Oumar Dia	Senegal	22.82	
50	10	Vezokuhle Ndlovu	Zimbabwe	22.83	
51	9	Ghith Al-Hajri	Oman	22.84	
52	5	Jose Jeris	India	22.86	
53	9	Andres Paez	Colombia	22.90	
54	2	Prince Yangou Bethykpaingui	Central African Republic	22.97	
55	9	El Hadad Houmadi	Comoros	23.14	
56	10	Matthew Croker	Malta	23.18	
57	5	Abdullaev Azim	Tajikistan	23.21	
58	1	Razat Kanthi Chakratbartey	Bangladesh	23.47	
59	2	Alassane Diakite	Mali	23.49	
60	7	Tran Quoc Nhan	Vietnam	23.66	
61	7	Aboubacar Coulibaly	Mali	24.19	
62	4	Steve Patton	DR Congo	25.06	
	7	Pedro Luiz de Oliveira	Brazil	DNF	
	1	Johnson Anywar	Uganda	DQ	
	8	Richard Ongom	Uganda	DQ	
	3	Martins Zacests	Latvia	DNS	
	4	Ernst Narib	Namibia	DNS	
	5	Mashaka Onyango	Tanzania	DNS	
	7	Justin Austin	United States	DNS	
	8	Hawa Sheka	Sierra Leone	DNS	

=== Quarterfinals ===
Qualification: First 3 in each heat and 4 best performers advanced to the Semifinals.

Wind:
Heat 1: +0.1 m/s, Heat 2: +1.7 m/s, Heat 3: +0.8 m/s, Heat 4: +0.4 m/s

Rank	Heat	Name	Nationality	Time	Notes
1	1	Shōta Iizuka	Japan	20.74	Q
2	4	Anaso Jobodwana	South Africa	20.76	Q
3	4	Oluwasegun Makinde	Canada	20.79	Q
4	1	Brendon Rodney	Canada	20.84	Q
5	4	Ramil Guliyev	Turkey	20.84	Q
6	4	Hua Wilfried Serge Koffi	Ivory Coast	20.85	q
7	1	Kamil Kryński	Poland	20.93	Q
8	3	Gao Dongshi	China	20.95	Q
9	1	Nicholas Hough	Australia	21.01	q
10	1	Aleksandr Khyutte	Russia	21.03	q
11	3	Sibusiso Matsenjwa	Swaziland	21.02	Q
12	3	Gideon Trotter	South Africa	21.07	Q
13	2	Rasheed Dwyer	Jamaica	21.07	Q
14	3	David Lima	Portugal	21.10	q
15	3	Diego Marani	Italy	21.15	
16	2	Artur Reysbikh	Russia	21.19	Q
17	2	Emmanuel Kubi	Ghana	21.30	Q
18	2	Egidijus Dilys	Lithuania	21.32	
19	1	Yang Zhanlin	China	21.46	
20	4	Lee Jaeha	South Korea	21.54	
21	4	Jesse Uri-Khob	Namibia	21.59	
22	2	Akiyuki Hashimoto	Japan	21.61	
23	2	Battulgyn Achitbileg	Mongolia	21.70	
24	4	Ruslan Perestiuk	Ukraine	21.82	
25	2	Keene Motukisi	Botswana	21.87	
26	4	Pedro Bernardo	Portugal	21.92	
27	2	Mike Kalisz	Denmark	22.16	
28	3	Nyasha Charandura	Zimbabwe	22.23	
29	1	Mak Shing Hei	Hong Kong	22.35	
30	3	Moulaye Sonko	Senegal	22.60	
	1	Anders Erlend Idaas	Norway	DNS	
	3	Roman Turcani	Slovakia	DNS	

=== Semifinals ===
Qualification: First 4 in each heat advanced to the Final.

Wind:
Heat 1: +2.2 m/s, Heat 2: +2.9 m/s

Rank	Heat	Name	Nationality	Time	Notes
1	1	Rasheed Dwyer	Jamaica	20.31	Q
2	2	Anaso Jobodwana	South Africa	20.36	Q
3	1	Shōta Iizuka	Japan	20.43	Q
4	1	Oluwasegun Makinde	Canada	20.48	Q
5	2	Brendon Rodney	Canada	20.71	Q
6	1	Hua Wilfried Serge Koffi	Ivory Coast	20.75	Q
7	2	Sibusiso Matsenjwa	Swaziland	20.82	Q
8	1	Ramil Guliyev	Turkey	20.84	
9	2	Kamil Kryński	Poland	20.90	Q
10	2	Nicholas Hough	Australia	20.97	
11	1	Gideon Trotter	South Africa	21.06	
12	2	Aleksandr Khyutte	Russia	21.14	
13	1	Artur Reysbikh	Russia	21.16	
14	2	Emmanuel Kubi	Ghana	21.17	
15	2	Gao Dongshi	China	21.46	
	1	David Lima	Portugal	DNS	

=== Final ===
Wind: +2.4 m/s

Official Video

Rank	Lane	Name	Nationality	Time	Notes
1st place, gold medalist(s)	5	Anaso Jobodwana	South Africa	20.00	
2nd place, silver medalist(s)	4	Rasheed Dwyer	Jamaica	20.23	
3rd place, bronze medalist(s)	6	Shōta Iizuka	Japan	20.33	
4	7	Oluwasegun Makinde	Canada	20.61	
5	2	Brendon Rodney	Canada	20.72	
6	1	Hua Wilfried Serge Koffi	Ivory Coast	20.73	
7	2	Kamil Kryński	Poland	20.94	
8	8	Sibusiso Matsenjwa	Swaziland	20.99	
