= Athletics at the 2013 Summer Universiade – Men's 400 metres =

The men's 400 metres event at the 2013 Summer Universiade was held on 7–9 July.

== Medalists ==
Gold	Silver	Bronze
Vladimir Krasnov; Russia	Anderson Henriques; Brazil	Nicholas Maitland; Jamaica

== Results ==
=== Heats ===
Qualification: First 3 in each heat and 6 best performers advanced to the semifinals.

Rank	Heat	Name	Nationality	Time	Notes
1	3	Anderson Henriques	Brazil	46.63	Q
2	5	Brian Gregan	Ireland	46.68	Q
3	1	Pedro Luiz de Oliveira	Brazil	46.69	Q
4	4	Tyler Harper	Canada	46.70	Q
5	1	Nicholas Maitland	Jamaica	46.76	Q
6	4	Wayde van Niekerk	South Africa	46.77	Q
7	5	Jacques de Swardt	South Africa	47.04	Q
8	2	Vladimir Krasnov	Russia	47.14	Q
9	1	Benjamin Ayesu-Attah	Canada	47.15	Q
10	5	Mathew Lynch	Australia	47.28	Q
11	4	Kengo Yamasaki	Japan	47.32	Q
12	3	Jun Kimura	Japan	47.42	Q
13	1	Mehmet Güzel	Turkey	47.48	q
14	6	Emmanuel Tugumisirize	Uganda	47.52	Q
15	5	Shaquille Dill	Bermuda	47.71	q
16	6	Yavuz Can	Turkey	47.93	Q
17	2	Ernst Narib	Namibia	48.11	Q
18	3	Rafał Omelko	Poland	48.17	Q
19	4	Mothusi Bolele	Botswana	48.30	q
20	6	Martins Zacests	Latvia	48.42	Q, PB
21	2	Alexander Carew	Australia	48.67	Q
22	6	Mohd Arif Zulhilmi Bin Alet	Malaysia	48.89	q
23	4	Kannathasan Subramaniam	Malaysia	49.12	q
24	5	Jesús Herrera	Colombia	49.20	q
25	6	Rauno Kunnapuu	Estonia	49.22	
26	1	Ibrahima Mbengue	Senegal	49.32	
27	6	Oumar Dia	Senegal	49.43	
28	1	Geoffrey Akena	Uganda	49.48	
29	3	Henry Stevens-Carty	Bermuda	49.49	
30	1	Mohammed Abubakari	Ghana	49.51	
31	2	Felix Attafoe	Ghana	49.61	
32	5	Ramzi Naim	Lebanon	49.76	
33	3	Matthew Croker	Malta	49.84	
34	5	Vezokuhle Ndlovu	Zimbabwe	50.01	
35	2	Madushanka Dinesh	Sri Lanka	50.17	
36	4	Ao Ioeng Ka Hou	Macau	50.31	
37	5	Rodolfo Edmond Taylor	Panama	51.19	
38	3	Moussargue Tchoumgoyo	Chad	53.12	
	1	Vladislavs Prosmickis	Latvia	DQ	FS
	2	Nijel Amos	Botswana	DNF	
	2	Mohamed Kamara	Sierra Leone	DNS	
	2	Peter Kiprotich	Kenya	DNS	
	3	Youssef Zeineddine	Lebanon	DNS	
	4	Fleury Oboba	Congo	DNS	
	6	Reginald Makunere	Zimbabwe	DNS	
	6	Noah Akwu	Nigeria	DNS	

=== Semifinals ===
Qualification: First 2 in each heat and 2 best performers advanced to the final.

Rank	Heat	Name	Nationality	Time	Notes
1	2	Brian Gregan	Ireland	45.91	Q
2	1	Rafał Omelko	Poland	45.94	Q, PB
3	1	Pedro Luiz de Oliveira	Brazil	45.96	Q
4	2	Vladimir Krasnov	Russia	46.03	Q
5	3	Nicholas Maitland	Jamaica	46.04	Q
6	3	Anderson Henriques	Brazil	46.17	Q
7	3	Emmanuel Tugumisirize	Uganda	46.19	q
8	1	Tyler Harper	Canada	46.26	q
9	2	Wayde van Niekerk	South Africa	46.39	
10	2	Yavuz Can	Turkey	46.65	
11	1	Jacques de Swardt	South Africa	46.68	
12	1	Jun Kimura	Japan	46.84	
13	2	Kengo Yamasaki	Japan	46.90	
14	3	Benjamin Ayesu-Attah	Canada	47.11	
15	1	Mathew Lynch	Australia	47.16	
16	3	Mehmet Güzel	Turkey	47.41	
17	2	Shaquille Dill	Bermuda	47.90	
18	3	Ernst Narib	Namibia	47.96	
19	2	Kannathasan Subramaniam	Malaysia	48.34	
20	3	Alexander Carew	Australia	48.47	
21	2	Martins Zacests	Latvia	48.58	
22	1	Mothusi Bolele	Botswana	49.11	
23	3	Jesús Herrera	Colombia	49.70	
	1	Mohd Arif Zulhilmi Bin Alet	Malaysia	??.??	

=== Final ===
Official Video

Rank	Lane	Name	Nationality	Time	Notes
1st place, gold medalist(s)	8	Vladimir Krasnov	Russia	45.49	SB
2nd place, silver medalist(s)	7	Anderson Henriques	Brazil	45.50	
3rd place, bronze medalist(s)	5	Nicholas Maitland	Jamaica	45.63	PB
4	6	Rafał Omelko	Poland	45.69	PB
5	3	Brian Gregan	Ireland	45.83	
6	4	Pedro Luiz de Oliveira	Brazil	45.96	
7	1	Emmanuel Tugumisirize	Uganda	46.63	
8	2	Tyler Harper	Canada	46.97	
