= Katherine Juhan-Arnold =

American farmer and politician

Agriculture Commissioner of Georgia
- Assuming office January 2027
- Governor: Keisha Lance Bottoms (elect)
- Succeeding: Tyler Harper

Personal details
- Born: 1988 or 1989 (age 37–38)
- Party: Democratic

Katherine E. Juhan-Arnold (born 1988 or 1989) is an American farmer, politician, and nonprofit founder who is the agriculture commissioner-elect of Georgia.

== Early life ==
Juhan-Arnold was born in 1988 or 1989. She was raised in Georgia.

== Career ==
In 2014, Juhan-Arnold founded Baby Katie's Pharm & Kitchen, a nonprofit organization based in Snellville, Georgia, that connects farmers and families with fresh produce. She named the group after her great-grandmother, who died the same year she was born. It became a 501(c)(3) organization in 2017. Juhan-Arnold farmed 2-acres of land in Deepstep, Georgia, for three years while maintaining community gardens in Stone Mountain, Georgia.

=== Politics ===
Juhan-Arnold ran in the 2026 Georgia Agriculture Commissioner election, winning the Democratic primary against farmer Sedrick Rowe with 62.1 percent versus 37.9 percent. She defeated Republican incumbent Tyler Harper in the general election by nearly 8 points. The win was considered a political upset. She will be the first woman and Black person to serve as the state's agriculture commissioner.

== See also ==
- List of African-American statewide elected officials
- Timeline of African-American firsts
