= Rowing at the 2013 Summer Universiade – Women's lightweight single sculls =

The women's lightweight single sculls competition at the 2013 Summer Universiade in Kazan took place the Kazan Rowing Centre.

== Results ==
=== Heats ===
==== Heat 1 ====
Rank	Rower	Country	Time	Notes
1	Julia Trautvetter	New Zealand	8:16.66	Q
2	Eleonora Trivella	Italy	8:23.94	Q
3	Christina Sperrer	Austria	8:24.64	Q
4	Ana Pallassao	Brazil	8:27.83	R
5	Larysa Zhalinska	Ukraine	9:04.71	R

==== Heat 2 ====
Rank	Rower	Country	Time	Notes
1	Kirsten McCann	South Africa	8:24.29	Q
2	Amy Bulman	Ireland	8:37.07	Q
3	Chen Oshri	Israel	8:46.19	Q
4	Ludmila Ivanova	Latvia	8:55.27	R

==== Heat 3 ====
Rank	Rower	Country	Time	Notes
1	Olga Arkadova	Russia	8:15.13	Q
2	Olivia Wyss	Switzerland	8:21.93	Q
3	Jung Hye-won	South Korea	8:24.25	Q
4	Gabriela Mosquiera	Paraguay	8:31.01	R

=== Repechage ===
Rank	Rower	Country	Time	Notes
1	Ana Pallassao	Brazil	9:27.83	Q
2	Ludmila Ivanova	Latvia	9:30.36	Q
3	Gabriela Mosqueira	Paraguay	9:39.52	Q
4	Larysa Zhalinska	Ukraine	9:44.63	

=== Semifinals ===
==== Semifinal 1 ====
Rank	Rower	Country	Time	Notes
	Gabriela Mosqueira	Paraguay		
	Chen Oshri	Israel		
	Kirsten McCann	South Africa		
	Julia Trautvetter	New Zealand		
	Olivia Wyss	Switzerland		
	Christina Sperrer	Austria		

==== Semifinal 2 ====
Rank	Rower	Country	Time	Notes
	Ana Pallassao	Brazil		
	Amy Bulman	Ireland		
	Olga Arkadova	Russia		
	Eleonora Trivella	Italy		
	Jung Hye-won	South Korea		
	Ludmila Ivanova	Latvia		
