= Athletics at the 2013 Summer Universiade – Men's 1500 metres =

The men's 1500 metres event at the 2013 Summer Universiade was held on 7–9 July.

== Medalists ==
Gold	Silver	Bronze
Valentin Smirnov; Russia	Jeremy Rae; Canada	Jeremiah Motsau; South Africa

== Results ==
=== Heats ===
Qualification: First 3 in each heat (Q) and the next 3 fastest (q) qualified for the final.

Rank	Heat	Name	Nationality	Time	Notes
1	2	Jeremiah Motsau	South Africa	3:40.29	Q
2	2	Yegor Nikolayev	Russia	3:41.14	Q
3	2	Paul Chelimo	Kenya	3:43.27	Q
4	1	Valentin Smirnov	Russia	3:43.72	Q, SB
5	1	Ali Hamdi	Belgium	3:43.77	Q
6	2	Jesús Arturo Esparza	Mexico	3:43.81	q
7	1	Dmitrijs Jurkevičs	Latvia	3:43.93	Q
8	1	Andries Hlaselo	South Africa	3:44.28	q
9	1	Ross Proudfoot	Canada	3:44.66	q
10	2	Mitja Krevs	Slovenia	3:45.45	
11	3	José Juan Esparza	Mexico	3:45.74	Q
12	2	Ivan Obezchik	Kazakhstan	3:46.36	
13	1	Cristian Vorovenci	Romania	3:47.07	
14	3	Jeremy Rae	Canada	3:47.81	Q
15	3	Johannes Alnes	Norway	3:48.63	Q, SB
16	3	Allar Lamp	Estonia	3:49.20	
17	2	Ashot Hayrapetyan	Armenia	3:51.06	
18	3	Jean Ferrugem	Brazil	3:58.52	
19	1	Herbert Gidadui	Uganda	4:00.00	
20	2	Gayan Paradiya Waththalage	Sri Lanka	4:03.67	
21	3	William Awunime Akuka	Ghana	4:04.65	
22	1	Ahmad Ghalie	Lebanon	4:07.49	
23	2	Abdullahi Barre	Somalia	4:14.69	
24	3	Balla Sanogo	Mali	4:47.69	
	3	Jaad Ahmed Aballa	Qatar	DNF	
	3	Ibrahim Omar Abdi	Djibouti	DNS	
	1	Víctor Manuel González	Guatemala	DNS	
	1	Alex Ngouari-Mouissi	Congo	DNS	
	2	Tuomo Salonen	Finland	DNS	

=== Final ===
Official Video

Rank	Name	Nationality	Time	Notes
1st place, gold medalist(s)	Valentin Smirnov	Russia	3:39.39	SB
2nd place, silver medalist(s)	Jeremy Rae	Canada	3:39.45	
3rd place, bronze medalist(s)	Jeremiah Motsau	South Africa	3:39.51	
4	Yegor Nikolayev	Russia	3:39.59	
5	Dmitrijs Jurkevičs	Latvia	3:39.79	
6	Paul Chelimo	Kenya	3:40.41	
7	Andries Hlaselo	South Africa	3:40.95	
8	José Juan Esparza	Mexico	3:42.00	
9	Ross Proudfoot	Canada	3:44.33	
10	Ali Hamdi	Belgium	3:44.38	
11	Jesús Arturo Esparza	Mexico	3:45.57	
12	Johannes Alnes	Norway	3:53.01	
