= Canada at the 2013 Summer Universiade =

- IOC code: CAN
- NOC: Canadian Olympic Committee
- Website: www.usports.ca

in Kazan
- Competitors: 442 in 17 sports
- Flag bearer: Shanice Marcelle
- Medals Ranked 19th: Gold 3 Silver 6 Bronze 9 Total 18

Summer Universiade appearances
- 1959; 1961; 1963; 1965; 1967; 1970; 1973; 1975; 1977; 1979; 1981; 1983; 1985; 1987; 1989; 1991; 1993; 1995; 1997; 1999; 2001; 2003; 2005; 2007; 2009; 2011; 2013; 2015; 2017; 2019; 2021; 2025; 2027

Canada competed at the 2013 Summer Universiade in Kazan, Russia. The team won a total of 16 medals, including 2 gold.

== Medalists ==
Medal	Name	Sport	Event	Date
Gold	Kimberley Hyacinthe	Athletics	Women's 200 metres	July
Gold	Katerine Savard	Swimming	Women's 100 metre butterfly	July
Silver	Jeremy Rae	Athletics	Men's 1500 metres	July
Silver	Benjamin Ayesu-Attah; Brendon Rodney; Michael Robertson; Tyler Harper	Athletics	Men's 4 x 400 metre relay	July
Silver	Benjamin Ayesu-Attah; Brendon Rodney; Michael Robertson; Tyler Harper	Athletics	Women's 4 x 400 metre relay	July
Silver	Katerine Savard	Swimming	Women's 50 metre butterfly	July
Silver	Elsabeth Black	Gymnastics	Women's floor	July
Bronze	Alicia Brown; Helen Crofts; Noelle Montcalm Sarah-Lynn Wells	Athletics	Men's 20 kilometres walk team	July
Bronze	Eric Hedlin	Swimming	Men's 800 metre freestyle	July
Bronze	Caroline Lapierre-Lemire; Brittany MacLean; Sandrine Mainville Paige Schultz	Swimming	Women's 4 x 100 metre freestyle relay	July
Bronze	Lindsay Delmar; Brittany MacLean; Paige Schultz; Savannah King	Swimming	Women's 4 x 200 metre freestyle relay	July
Bronze	Marie-Ève Beauchemin-Nadeau	Weightlifting	Women's 75 kg	July
Bronze	Elsabeth Black	Gymnastics	Women's balance beam	July
Bronze	Stacie Anaka	Wrestling	Women's freestyle 67 kg	July
Bronze	Erica Wiebe	Wrestling	Women's freestyle 72 kg	July
Bronze	Team Canada	Rugby sevens	Women's tournament	July

== Athletics ==
Canada was represented by fifty-two athletes.

== Badminton ==
Canada was represented by six male and five female badminton players.

=== Men ===
Athlete	Event	Round of 32	Round of 16	Quarterfinals	Semifinals	Final	
Athlete	Event	Opposition Score	Opposition Score	Opposition Score	Opposition Score	Opposition Score	Rank
Philippe Gaumond	Singles						
Martin Giuffre	Singles						
Andrew Lau	Singles						

=== Women ===
Athlete	Event	Round of 32	Round of 16	Quarterfinals	Semifinals	Final	
Athlete	Event	Opposition Score	Opposition Score	Opposition Score	Opposition Score	Opposition Score	Rank
Adrianna Giuffre	Singles						
Stephanie Pakenham	Singles						
Bethany So	Singles						

== Basketball ==
Canada has qualified both a men's and a women's team.

=== Men ===
The men's team will participate in Group C.

==== Preliminary round ====
Team	Pld	W	L	PF	PA	PD	Pts
Canada	5	5	0	494	336	+158	10
Australia	5	4	1	462	329	+133	9
United States	5	3	2	488	351	+137	8
Czech Republic	5	2	3	331	385	−54	7
Sweden	5	1	4	329	371	−42	6
United Arab Emirates	4	0	4	255	587	−332	4

7 July 2013
20:30

Report

Canada	84–69	Sweden
Scoring by quarter: 19–10, 24–15, 19–26, 22–18

Miras Sports Complex
Attendance: 77

8 July 2013
20:30

Report

Canada	137–43	United Arab Emirates
Scoring by quarter: 31–12, 36–15, 33–12, 37–4

Miras Sports Complex
Attendance: 64

10 July 2013
13:00

Report

Canada	92–83	Australia
Scoring by quarter: 27–15, 14–31, 24–21, 27–16

Basket Hall
Attendance: 600

11 July 2013
20:30

Report

Canada	87–56	Czech Republic
Scoring by quarter: 10–19, 18–15, 30–12, 29–10

Miras Sports Complex
Attendance: 300

12 July 2013
13:00

Report

Canada	94–85	United States
Scoring by quarter: 18–17, 28–19, 23–22, 25–27

Basket Hall
Attendance: 1,700

==== Elimination round ====
14 July 2013
18:00

Report

Canada	88–77	Brazil
Scoring by quarter: 17–20, 21–17, 21–15, 29–25
Pts: Heslip 20; Rebs: Powell, Klassen 6 Asts: Pangos, P. Scrubb 4		Pts: Silva 15; Rebs: Deodato 6 Asts: three players 4

Miras Sports Complex
Attendance: 537
Referees: Mindaugas Vecherskis (LTU), Thomas Short (USA), Yrjo Johannes Sarekoski (FIN)

15 July 2013
16:30

Report

Russia	78–68	Canada
Scoring by quarter: 22–11, 21–15, 21–18, 14–24
Pts: Karasev 20; Rebs: Karasev 10; Asts: Karasev 7		Pts: three players 12; Rebs: T. Scrubb, Mullings 7 Asts: Mullings, P. Scrubb 3

Basket Hall
Attendance: 2,500
Referees: Boris Schmidt (GER), Stanislav Kucera (CZE), Rodrigo Oliveros (CHI)

=== Women ===
The women's team will participate in Group C.

==== Team roster ====
The women's team roster is as follows:

Canada Women's World University Games Team roster
Players
Coaches

Pos.	No.	Name	Age – Date of birth	Height	Club	Ctr.
C	13	Taijah Campbell	–	6 ft 3 in (1.91 m)	Virginia Tech	(United States)
G/F	10	Erin Kelsey Chambers	–	6 ft 1 in (1.85 m)	Simon Fraser University	(Canada)
G	9	Rachelle Coward	–	6 ft 0 in (1.83 m)	Charleston Southern University	(United States)
C	15	Dalyce Emmerson	–	6 ft 3 in (1.91 m)	University of Saskatchewan	(Canada)
C	14	Tessa Kreiger	–	6 ft 4 in (1.93 m)	University of Windsor	(Canada)
G	6	Miah-Marie Langlois	–	5 ft 8 in (1.73 m)	University of Windsor	(Canada)
F	12	Lindsay Ledingham	–	6 ft 0 in (1.83 m)	University of Regina	(Canada)
G	5	Dianna Ros	–	5 ft 7 in (1.7 m)	McGill University	(Canada)
F	11	Kara Spotton	–	6 ft 2 in (1.88 m)	Colorado State University	(United States)
G	7	Korissa Williams	–	5 ft 9 in (1.75 m)	University of Windsor	(Canada)
G	8	Kris Young	–	6 ft 0 in (1.83 m)	University of British Columbia	(Canada)

Head coach

- (Canada) Fabian McKenzie (Cape Breton University)

Assistant coaches

- (Canada) Michèle Bélanger (University of Toronto)
- (Canada) Chantal Vallée (University of Windsor)

Team Manager

- (Canada) Jeff Speedy (University of New Brunswick)

Therapist

- (Canada) Patrice Pepin

Legend

- (C) Team captain
- nat field describes country of university
- Age field is age on July 7, 2013

==== Preliminary round ====
Team	Pld	W	L	PF	PA	PD	Pts
Chinese Taipei	3	3	0	225	199	+26	6
Canada	3	1	2	200	179	+21	4
Ukraine	3	1	2	193	209	−16	4
Japan	3	1	2	180	211	−31	4

8 July 2013
10:00

Report

Canada	76–48	Japan
Scoring by quarter: 18–6, 24–14, 21–12, 13–16

Biek Tau Sports Complex
Attendance: 293

9 July 2013
10:00

Report

Canada	55–57	Ukraine
Scoring by quarter: 13–19, 15–8, 20–16, 9–16

Miras Sports Complex
Attendance: 92

10 July 2013
20:30

Report

Chinese Taipei	72–67	Canada
Scoring by quarter: 21–11, 18–9, 21–23, 12–24

Miras Sports Complex

==== Elimination rounds ====
13 July 2013
13:00

Report

Sweden	75–72 (OT)	Canada
Scoring by quarter: 15–20, 10–17, 22–6, 19–23, Overtime: 9–6
Pts: Hamilton-Carter 22; Rebs: Loyd 9 Asts: Hamilton-Carter 3		Pts: Langlois 26; Rebs: Four tied at 5 Asts: Langlois 5

Basket Hall
Referees: Sergey Mikhaylov (RUS), Tim Mills (AUS), Dariusz Zapolski (POL)

15 July 2013
10:00

Report

Canada	55–60	Hungary
Scoring by quarter: 17–10, 16–19, 8–15, 14–16
Pts: Langlois 13; Rebs: Williams 9 Asts: Two tied at 3		Pts: Krivacevic 19; Rebs: Krivacevic 8 Asts: Ambrus 5

Basket Hall
Referees: Seme Ovinov (RUS), Fabio Kover (BRA), Viktor Bozhenar (UKR)

== Beach volleyball ==
Canada will be represented by one men's team and two women's teams.

=== Men ===
Athletes	Event	Preliminary round (3)	Elimination rounds						
Athletes	Event	Preliminary round (3)	Round 1	Round 2	Round 3	Quarterfinals	Semifinals	Final	Standing
Athletes	Event	Opposition Score	Opposition Score	Opposition Score	Opposition Score	Opposition Score	Opposition Score	Opposition Score	Standing
Grant O'Gorman; Samuel Pedlow	Doubles								

=== Women ===
Athletes	Event	Preliminary round (3)	Elimination rounds						
Athletes	Event	Preliminary round (3)	Round 1	Round 2	Round 3	Quarterfinals	Semifinals	Final	Standing
Athletes	Event	Opposition Score	Opposition Score	Opposition Score	Opposition Score	Opposition Score	Opposition Score	Opposition Score	Standing
Taylor Pischke; Melissa Humana-Paredes	Doubles								
Rachel Cockrell; Charlotte Sider	Doubles								

== Fencing ==
Canada will be represented by sixteen fencers.

=== Men ===
Athlete	Event	Round of 64	Round of 32	Round of 16	Quarterfinal	Semifinal	Final / BM	
Athlete	Event	Opposition Score	Opposition Score	Opposition Score	Opposition Score	Opposition Score	Opposition Score	Rank
Kerr Hutchinson	Individual épée							
Marc-André Leblanc	Individual épée							
David Shorey	Individual épée							
John Wright	Individual épée							
Cédric Boutet	Individual sabre							
Julien Hogues	Individual sabre							
Paul Pietrusinski	Individual sabre							
Haig Basmadjian	Individual foil							
Scott Dudiak	Individual foil							
François Provencher	Individual foil							
Jean-Marc Turk	Individual foil							

=== Women ===
Athlete	Event	Round of 64	Round of 32	Round of 16	Quarterfinal	Semifinal	Final / BM	
Athlete	Event	Opposition Score	Opposition Score	Opposition Score	Opposition Score	Opposition Score	Opposition Score	Rank
Valérie Hogues	Individual épée							
Karis Langvand	Individual épée							
Vivian Poon	Individual épée							
Chantel Helwer	Individual sabre							
Aimée Schryer	Individual foil							

== Football ==
Canada will be represented by both a men's and a women's football team.

=== Men ===
The men's team will participate in Pool D.

==== Team roster ====
The team roster is as follows:

Name	Position	University
Sotiri Varlokostas	Goalkeeper	York University
Jonathan Viscosi	Goalkeeper	University at Buffalo
Dominic Bell	Defender	Western University
Paul Clerc	Defender	University of British Columbia
Nafi Dicko-Raynauld	Defender	Laval University
Alexandre Haddad	Defender	Université de Montréal
Eduardo Herrera	Defender	Université de Montréal
Niko Saler	Defender	University of Alberta
Eric Amato	Midfielder	Western University
Dylan Bams	Midfielder	University of Toronto
Andrew Hood	Midfielder	University of Alberta
Marcus Johnstone	Midfielder	University of Alberta
Joey Kewin	Midfielder	Carleton University
Matt Medoruma	Midfielder	University of Lethbridge
Colin Parenteau-Michon	Midfielder	Université de Montréal
Marco Visintin	Midfielder	University of British Columbia
Mario Kovacevic	Striker	University of Toronto
Robbie Murphy	Striker	Guelph University
Mark Reilly	Striker	McMaster University

Head coach: Pat Raimondo, Université de Montréal
Assistant coaches: Rock Basacco, Western University; Randy Bardock, University of Lethbridge

==== Preliminary round ====
Team	Pld	W	D	L	GF	GA	GD	Pts
France	3	1	2	0	5	2	+3	5
Canada	3	1	2	0	5	3	+2	5
Brazil	3	1	2	0	2	1	+1	5
Peru	3	0	0	3	0	6	−6	0

5 July 2013
14:00

Canada	v	France

Raketa Stadium

8 July 2013
20:00

Canada	v	Peru

Raketa Stadium

10 July 2013
20:00

Brazil	v	Canada

Olymp Stadium

=== Women ===
The women's team will participate in Group B.

==== Team roster ====
The team roster is as follows:

Name	Position	University
Rachel Bedek	Goalkeeper	Carleton University
Kristen Funk	Goalkeeper	Trinity Western University
Kelly Cook	Defender	University of British Columbia
Jilian Dietrich	Defender	Trinity Western University
Shalla Kadima	Defender	University of Alberta
Julie Lafreniere	Defender	University of Manitoba
Victoria Saccomani	Defender	University of Alberta
Kelsey Tikka	Defender	Wilfrid Laurier University
Natalie Boyd	Midfielder	Trinity Western University
Constance De Chantal-Dumont	Midfielder	Université de Montréal
Elise Emmott	Midfielder	University of Alberta
Julia Francki	Midfielder	University of Ottawa
Veronica Mazella	Midfielder	Carleton University
Carleigh Miller	Midfielder	University of Alberta
Jaclyn Sawicki	Midfielder	University of Victoria
Meagan Cormier	Forward	University of Regina
Julia Ignacio	Forward	University of Alberta
Pilar Khoury	Forward	University of Ottawa
Heather Lund	Forward	University of Alberta
Jackie Tessier	Forward	Queen's University

Head coach: Liz Jepsen, University of Alberta
Assistant coach: Steve Johnson, University of Ottawa

==== Preliminary round ====
Team	Pld	W	D	L	GF	GA	GD	Pts
Mexico	3	3	0	0	13	6	+7	9
Republic of Ireland	3	1	1	1	3	4	−1	4
Canada	3	1	0	2	6	4	+2	3
China	3	0	1	2	2	10	−8	1

Source: Kazan 2013
5 July 2013
11:00

Canada	v	Mexico

Trudovye Rezervy Stadium

7 July 2013
17:00

Canada	v	Republic of Ireland

Trudovye Rezervy Stadium

9 July 2013
17:00

China	v	Canada

Rubin Stadium

== Gymnastics ==
Canada will be represented in both artistic gymnastics and rhythmic gymnastics.

=== Artistic gymnastics ===
Ten gymnasts will compete in the artistic gymnastics competition.

=== Rhythmic gymnastics ===
Two gymnasts will compete in the rhythmic gymnastics competition.

== Rugby sevens ==
Canada will be represented by both a men's and a women's rugby sevens team.

=== Men ===
The men's team will participate in Group A.

==== Team roster ====
The team roster is as follows:

Name	Position	Club
Andrew Battaglia	Front Row	University of California, Berkeley
Byron Boville	Scrum Half	University of Guelph
Justin Chan	Centre	University of Western Ontario
Jonathan Hill	Centre	University of British Columbia
Eric Howard	Centre	University of Guelph
Caleb Jordan	Wing	Concordia University
Richard Lebel	Front Row	University of Waterloo
Liam Murphy-Burke	Front Row	University of British Columbia
Joe Newman	Centre	University of Guelph
Ade Ojo	Front Row	University of Western Ontario
Riley Saliken	Scrum Half	Royal Military College of Canada
Matt Taylor	Wing	Royal Military College of Canada

Head coach: Sean McDonaugh, Royal Military College of Canada
Assistant coach: Cory Hector, University of Guelph

==== Preliminary round ====
Team	GP	W	D	L	PF	PA	PD	Pts
Russia								
France								
Japan								
Canada								
Ukraine								

14 July 2013
13:24

Russia	v	Canada

Tulpar Stadium

14 July 2013
16:20

Canada	v	Japan

Tulpar Stadium

15 July 2013
10:22

France	v	Canada

Tulpar Stadium

15 July 2013
13:18

Canada	v	Ukraine

Tulpar Stadium

=== Women ===
The women's team will participate in Group A.

==== Team roster ====
The team roster is as follows:

Name	Position	Club
Jean Baker	Prop	Saint Mary's University
Kehla Guimond	Scrum Half	University of Victoria
Chelsea Guthrie	Scrum Half	University of Alberta
Kathleen Keller	Hooker	Laval University
Sarah Meng	Back	University of Ottawa
Brianna Miller	Fly half	McGill University
Tiera Thomas-Reynolds	Hooker	York University
Natasha Smith	Wing	Carleton University
Shannon Spurrell	Centre	University of Guelph
Caroline Suchorski	Prop	McGill University
Karla Telidetzki	Wing	University of Toronto
Natasha Watcham-Roy	Centre	University of Ottawa

Head coach: Matt Parrish, University of Alberta
Assistant coach: Joe Costello, York University

==== Preliminary round ====
Team	GP	W	D	L	PF	PA	PD	Pts
Russia								
Poland								
Canada								
Ukraine								

14 July 2013
10:28

Russia	v	Canada

Tulpar Stadium

14 July 2013
15:14

Poland	v	Canada

Tulpar Stadium

15 July 2013
11:28

Canada	v	Ukraine

Tulpar Stadium

== Shooting ==
Canada will be represented by three shooters.

=== Men ===
Athlete	Event	Qualification		Final	
Athlete	Event	Points	Rank	Points	Rank
Jeremy Gyoerick	10 metre air pistol				
Jeremy Gyoerick	25 metre standard pistol				
Jeremy Gyoerick	25 metre rapid fire pistol				
Jeremy Gyoerick	50 metre pistol				

=== Women ===
Athlete	Event	Qualification		Final	
Athlete	Event	Points	Rank	Points	Rank
Kelsey Bjorkman	10 metre air pistol				
Christine King	10 metre air pistol				
Kelsey Bjorkman	25 metre pistol				
Christine King	25 metre pistol				

== Swimming ==
Canada will be represented by thirty-eight swimmers.

== Synchronized swimming ==
Canada will be represented by eight synchronized swimmers.

Athlete	Event	Technical routine		Free routine (preliminary)			Free routine (final)		
Athlete	Event	Points	Rank	Points	Total (technical + free)	Rank	Points	Total (technical + free)	Rank
Samantha Nealon	Solo								
Janelle Ball; Gabriella Brisson; Rachel Fréchette; Caroline Larcher-Landry; Rebecca Maule; Katie MacLeod; Samantha Nealon; Lisa Sanders	Team			—N/a					

== Volleyball ==
Canada has qualified both a men's and a women's team.

=== Men ===
The men's team will participate in Group D.

==== Team roster ====
The team roster is as follows:

Name	Position	Club
Derek Nieroda	Libero	University of Manitoba
Nicholas Hoag	Left Side	Université de Sherbrooke
Marc Howatson	Left Side	Trinity Western University
Braden McLean	Middle	University of Saskatchewan
Daniel Jansen Van Doorn	Middle	Trinity Western University
Colton de Man	Left Side	Mount Royal University
Jay Blankenau	Setter	University of Calgary
Steven Marshall	Left Side	Trinity Western University
Lucas Van Berkel	Middle	Trinity Western University
TJ Sanders	Setter	McMaster University
Chris Voth	Setter	University of Manitoba
Chris Hoag	Left Side	University of Calgary

Head coach: Larry McKay, University of Winnipeg
Assistant coach: Steve Leknois, Royal Military College of Canada; Tilen Kozamernik, Arkas Spor Izmir

==== Preliminary round ====
Pos	Team	Pld	W	L	Pts	SW	SL	SR	SPW	SPL	SPR	Qualification
1	Czech Republic	4	3	1	9	10	4	2.500	329	302	1.089	Quarterfinals
2	Canada	4	3	1	9	10	5	2.000	355	311	1.141	Quarterfinals
3	Mexico	4	2	2	6	8	7	1.143	351	345	1.017	9th–16th place
4	Chile	4	2	2	6	7	7	1.000	324	315	1.029	9th–16th place
5	United Arab Emirates	4	0	4	0	0	12	0.000	217	303	0.716	17th–21st place

Date	Time		Score		Set 1	Set 2	Set 3	Set 4	Set 5	Total	Report
6 July	13:00	United Arab Emirates	0–3	Canada	14-25	16-25	16-25			46–0	P2 P3
7 July	18:00	Canada	3–1	Mexico	21–25	28–26	25–22	25–18		99–91	P2 P3
8 July	15:00	Chile	3–1	Canada	25–20	19–25	25–17	25–22		94–84	P2 P3
11 July	20:00	Canada	3–1	Czech Republic	26–24	25–14	21–25	25–17		97–80	P2 P3

=== Women ===
The women's team will participate in Group B.

==== Team roster ====
The team roster is as follows:

Name	Position	Club
Tesca Andrew-Wasylik	Libero	University of Winnipeg
Lisa Barclay	Outside Hitter	University of British Columbia
Lucy Charuk	Middle	University of Houston
Dana Cranston	Outside Hitter	Colorado State University
Megan Cyr	Setter	North Carolina State University
Kelci French	Setter	Trinity Western University
Tabi Love	Outside Hitter	University of California, Los Angeles
Shanice Marcelle	Outside Hitter	University of British Columbia
Marie-Sophie Nadeau	Outside Hitter	Université de Montréal
Kelly Nyhof	Middle	Humber College
Alicia Perrin	Middle	Trinity Western University
Kyla Richey	Outside Hitter	University of British Columbia

Head coach: Arnd Ludwig, Volleyball Canada
Assistant coach: Olivier Trudel, Université de Montréal

==== Preliminary round ====
Pos	Team	Pld	W	L	Pts	SW	SL	SR	SPW	SPL	SPR	Qualification
1	Brazil	2	2	0	6	6	0	MAX	150	91	1.648	Quarterfinals
2	Canada	2	1	1	3	3	3	1.000	118	129	0.915	Quarterfinals
3	Norway	2	0	2	0	0	6	0.000	102	150	0.680	9th–15th place

Date	Time		Score		Set 1	Set 2	Set 3	Set 4	Set 5	Total	Report
8 July	15:00	Canada	3–0	Norway	25–21	25–14	25–19			75–54	P2 P3
10 July	15:00	Brazil	3–0	Canada	25–15	25–15	25–13			75–43	P2 P3

== Water polo ==
Canada has qualified both a men's team and a women's team.

=== Men ===
The men's team will participate in Group A.

==== Team roster ====
The team roster is as follows:

Name	Position	Club
Marko Bjelica	Driver	University of Toronto
Dusan Boskovic	Driver	Carleton University
Nikola Curcija	Driver	University of Calgary
Matija Dabic	Driver	Heritage College
Eric Graham	Driver	University of Regina
Oscar Henning	Centre	St. Mary's University
David Lapins	Centre	Athabasca University
Nikola Mitrovic	Driver	
Martin Pelland	Centre Guard	
Connor Perry	Centre Guard	British Columbia Institute of Technology
Milan Radenovic	Goalie	University of Calgary
Daniel Sullivan	Goalie	University of Calgary
Devon Thumwood	Driver	Mount Royal University

Head coach: Michel Roy
Assistant coach: Robert Couillard

==== Preliminary round ====
Team	GP	W	D	L	GF	GA	GD	Pts
Russia								
Japan								
Hungary								
Australia								
Canada								
Georgia								

5 July 2013; 20:00	Russia	–	Canada	Burevestnik Swimming Pool

7 July 2013; 17:00	Canada	–	Japan	Burevestnik Swimming Pool

8 July 2013; 12:30	Canada	–	Georgia	Burevestnik Swimming Pool

10 July 2013; 17:00	Canada	–	Hungary	Burevestnik Swimming Pool

11 July 2013; 17:00	Australia	–	Canada	Burevestnik Swimming Pool

=== Women ===
The women's team will participate in Group A.

==== Team roster ====
The team roster is as follows:

Name	Position	Club
Claire Wright	Goalie	Loyola Marymount University
Jessica Gaudreault	Goalie	Indiana University
Shelby Taylor	2-Metre Guard	Indiana University
Gurpreet Sohi	Driver	Stanford University
Cara Robinson	Driver	San Jose State University
Shae Fournier	Driver	Indiana University
Kelly McKee	Driver	University of California, Berkeley
Danika Kotylak	Driver	University of Hawaii
Taylor Molde	Driver	University of Hawaii
Rae Lekness	Centre forward	San Jose State University
Elyse Lemay-Lavoie	Centre forward	Ahuntsic College
Rebekka Steenkamer	Centre forward	Concordia University
Alexa Tielmann	Centre forward	University of California, Los Angeles

Head coach: Andrew Robinson
Assistant coach: Justin Mitchell

==== Preliminary round ====
Team	GP	W	D	L	GF	GA	GD	Pts
Russia								
Italy								
Canada								
Japan								

6 July 2013; 13:00	Italy	–	Canada	Burevestnik Swimming Pool

8 July 2013; 20:00	Russia	–	Canada	Olymp Swimming Pool

10 July 2013; 15:30	Canada	–	Japan	Olymp Swimming Pool

== Weightlifting ==
Canada will be represented by six male and three female weightlifters.

=== Men ===
Athlete	Event	Snatch		Clean & Jerk		Total	Rank
Athlete	Event	Result	Rank	Result	Rank	Total	Rank
Samuel Pietracupa	69 kg						
Roody St-Pierre	69 kg						
Jérôme Boisclair	77 kg						
Francis Luna-Grenier	77 kg						
Mathieu Marineau	85 kg						
Richard Gonsalves	94 kg						

=== Women ===
Athlete	Event	Snatch		Clean & Jerk		Total	Rank
Athlete	Event	Result	Rank	Result	Rank	Total	Rank
Kristel Ngarlem	69 kg						
Rachel Siemens	69 kg						
Marie-Ève Beauchemin-Nadeau	75 kg						

== Wrestling ==
Canada will be represented by five male and seven female wrestlers.

=== Men ===
Freestyle

Athlete	Event	Round of 16	Quarterfinal	Semifinal	Repechage 1	Repechage 2	Final / BM	
Athlete	Event	Opposition Result	Opposition Result	Opposition Result	Opposition Result	Opposition Result	Opposition Result	Rank
Steven Takahashi	55 kg							
Mike Asselstine	60 kg							
Brian Hutton	66 kg							
Shawn Daye-Finley	74 kg							
Jordan Steen	84 kg							

=== Women ===
Freestyle

Athlete	Event	Round of 16	Quarterfinal	Semifinal	Repechage 1	Repechage 2	Final / BM	
Athlete	Event	Opposition Result	Opposition Result	Opposition Result	Opposition Result	Opposition Result	Opposition Result	Rank
Natasha Kramble	48 kg							
Diana Ford	51 kg							
Jillian Gallays	55 kg							
	59 kg							
Danielle Lappage	63 kg							
Stacie Anaka	67 kg							
Erica Wiebe	72 kg							
