= Rowing at the 2013 Summer Universiade – Men's coxless pair =

The men's coxless pair competition at the 2013 Summer Universiade in Kazan took place the Kazan Rowing Centre.

== Results ==
=== Heats ===
==== Heat 1 ====
| Rank | Rower | Country | Time | Notes |
|---|---|---|---|---|
| 1 | Paddy McInnes; Logan Rodger | New Zealand | 7:02.17 | Q |
| 2 | Jean Noury; Hugo Laborde | France | 7:04.21 | R |
| 3 | Karl Koppel; Martin Laius | Estonia | 7:23.02 | R |
| 4 | Mark Geza Lovass; Norbert Porubszky | Hungary | 7:29.54 | R |
| 5 | Karlis Bileskalns; Renars Lasks | Latvia | 7:30.66 | R |
| 6 | Muhammad Nur Afiq Bin Johari; Ahmad Ahmad Izuddin | Malaysia | 8:11.38 | R |

==== Heat 2 ====
| Rank | Rower | Country | Time | Notes |
|---|---|---|---|---|
| 1 | Aleksandr Chaukin; Iurii Pshenichnikov | Russia | 6:58.08 | Q |
| 2 | Anton Kholyaznykov; Viktor Grebennykov | Ukraine | 7:08.57 | R |
| 3 | Jacopo Palma; Fabrizio Gabriele | Italy | 7:16.23 | R |
| 4 | Gabriel Moraes; Arthur Paula | Brazil | 7:25.49 | R |
| 5 | Samantha Peyahandhi; Charuka Amarappulige | Sri Lanka | 8:59.79 | R |

=== Repechage ===
==== Repechage Heat 1 ====
| Rank | Rower | Country | Time | Notes |
|---|---|---|---|---|
| | Muhammad Nur Afiq Bin Johari; Ahmad Ahmad Izuddin | Malaysia | | |
| | Mark Geza Lovass; Norbert Porubszky | Hungary | | |
| | Jean Noury; Hugo Laborde | France | | |
| | Jacopo Palma; Fabrizio Gabriele | Italy | | |
| | Samantha Peyahandhi; Charuka Amarappulige | Sri Lanka | | |

==== Repechage Heat 2 ====
| Rank | Rower | Country | Time | Notes |
|---|---|---|---|---|
| | Gabriel Moraes; Arthur Paula | Brazil | | |
| | Anton Kholyaznykov; Viktor Grebennykov | Ukraine | | |
| | Karl Koppel; Martin Laius | Estonia | | |
| | Karlis Bileskalns; Renars Lasks | Latvia | | |
