= Stella-Iro Ledaki =

Greek pole vaulter

Personal information
- Born: 18 July 1988 (age 37) Chania, Greece
- Height: 1.70 m (5 ft 7 in)
- Weight: 60 kg (130 lb)

Sport
- Country: Greece
- Sport: Athletics
- Event: Pole vault
Medal record
Women's Athletics
Representing Greece
Mediterranean Games
Gold medal – first place	Mersin 2013	Pole vault
- Updated on 15 August 2012

Stella-Iro Ledaki (Greek: Στέλλα-Ηρώ Λεδάκη; born 18 July 1988) is a Greek pole vaulter. She competed at the 2012 Summer Olympics.

== Competition record ==
Year	Competition	Venue	Position	Notes
Representing Greece
2005	World Youth Championships	Marrakesh, Morocco	11th	3.65 m
2006	World Junior Championships	Beijing, China	20th (q)	3.80 m
2007	European Junior Championships	Hengelo, Netherlands	15th (q)	3.90 m
2009	European U23 Championships	Kaunas, Lithuania	20th (q)	3.85 m
2012	European Championships	Helsinki, Finland	13th (q)	4.35 m
2012	Olympic Games	London, United Kingdom	13th (q)	4.50 m
2013	European Indoor Championships	Gothenburg, Sweden	15th (q)	4.16 m
2013	Mediterranean Games	Mersin, Turkey	1st	4.50 m (=GR)
2013	Universiade	Kazan, Russia	9th	4.10 m
2013	World Championships	Moscow, Russia	–	NM
