= 2026 Georgia Agriculture Commissioner election =

- November 3, 2026

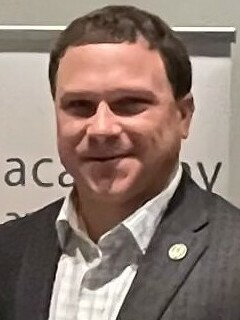
Nominee	Katherine Juhan-Arnold	Tyler Harper
Party	Democratic	Republican
Popular vote	2,241,868	1,921,774
Percentage	53.84%	46.16%
- Juhan-Arnold: 50–60% 60–70% 70–80% 80–90% Harper: 50–60% 60–70% 70–80% 80–90% 90–100%
Agriculture Commissioner before election
Tyler Harper
Republican
Elected Agriculture Commissioner
Katherine Juhan-Arnold
Democratic

The 2026 Georgia Agriculture Commissioner election was held on November 3, 2026, to elect the Georgia Agriculture Commissioner. Primary elections were held on May 19. Incumbent Republican commissioner Tyler Harper ran for re-election. In the November 3 general election, Democratic nominee Katherine Juhan-Arnold defeated Harper, becoming the first Democrat elected Georgia Agriculture Commissioner since 2006.

== Republican primary ==
=== Candidates ===
==== Nominee ====
- Tyler Harper, incumbent commissioner

=== Results ===
Republican primary
Party	Candidate	Votes	%
Republican	Tyler Harper (incumbent)	820,825	100.0
Total votes		820,825	100.0

== Democratic primary ==
=== Candidates ===
==== Nominee ====
- Katherine Juhan-Arnold, nonprofit founder

==== Eliminated in primary ====
- Sedrick Rowe, organic farmer

=== Results ===
Primary results by county: Juhan-Arnold: 50–60%; 60–70%; 70–80%; Rowe: 50–60%; 60–70%

Democratic primary
Party	Candidate	Votes	%
Democratic	Katherine Juhan-Arnold	628,224	62.1
Democratic	Sedrick Rowe	383,284	37.9
Total votes		1,011,508	100.0

== General election ==
=== Results ===
2026 Georgia Agriculture Commissioner election
Party	Candidate	Votes	%	±%
Republican	Tyler Harper (incumbent)			
Democratic	Katherine Juhan-Arnold			
Total votes			100.0	
