= Rugby sevens at the 2013 Summer Universiade – Women's tournament =

Women's rugby sevens at the XXVII Summer Universiade
- Venues: Tulpar Stadium; Dinamo Stadium (training)
- Dates: July 14, 2013 – July 17, 2013
- Teams: 10

Medalists
| 1st place, gold medalist(s) | | Russia (RUS) |
| 2nd place, silver medalist(s) | | Italy (ITA) |
| 3rd place, bronze medalist(s) | | Canada (CAN) |

The women's tournament of rugby sevens at the 2013 Summer Universiade was held from July 14 to 17 in Kazan, Russia.

== Preliminary round ==
=== Group A ===
| Team | GP | W | D | L | PF | PA | PD | Pts |
|---|---|---|---|---|---|---|---|---|
| Russia | 4 | 4 | 0 | 0 | 126 | 17 | +109 | 12 |
| Ukraine | 4 | 3 | 0 | 1 | 79 | 50 | +29 | 10 |
| Canada | 4 | 2 | 0 | 2 | 70 | 107 | −37 | 8 |
| France | 4 | 1 | 0 | 3 | 89 | 82 | +7 | 6 |
| Japan | 4 | 0 | 0 | 4 | 15 | 87 | −72 | 4 |

14 July 2013
9:00

| Russia | 33–5 | Ukraine |
| Try: Edidzhi 2 Con: Kudinova 4 | Report | Try: Borodina 1 |

Tulpar Stadium
Referee: Katharina Pickert (GER)

14 July 2013
9:22

| France | 22–0 | Japan |
| | Report |

Tulpar Stadium

14 July 2013
13:24

| Russia | 38–7 | Canada |
| | Report |

Tulpar Stadium

14 July 2013
13:46

| France | 10–17 | Ukraine |
| | Report |

Tulpar Stadium

14 July 2013
16:20

| Canada | 27–10 | Japan |
| | Report |

Tulpar Stadium

14 July 2013
16:42

| Russia | 36–0 | France |
| | Report |

Tulpar Stadium

15 July 2013
10:00

| Japan | 0–19 | Ukraine |
| | Report |

Tulpar Stadium

15 July 2013
10:22

| France | 21–29 | Canada |
| | Report |

Tulpar Stadium

15 July 2013
12:56

| Russia | 19–5 | Japan |
| | Report |

Tulpar Stadium

15 July 2013
13:18

| Canada | 7–38 | Ukraine |
| | Report |

Tulpar Stadium

=== Group B ===
| Team | GP | W | D | L | PF | PA | PD | Pts |
|---|---|---|---|---|---|---|---|---|
| Great Britain | 4 | 4 | 0 | 0 | 115 | 39 | +76 | 12 |
| China | 4 | 2 | 0 | 2 | 64 | 67 | −3 | 8 |
| Italy | 4 | 1 | 1 | 2 | 67 | 67 | 0 | 7 |
| Brazil | 4 | 1 | 1 | 2 | 44 | 78 | −34 | 7 |
| United States | 4 | 1 | 0 | 3 | 32 | 71 | −39 | 6 |

14 July 2013
9:44

| Italy | 22–14 | China |
| | Report |

Tulpar Stadium

14 July 2013
10:06

| Brazil | 12–5 | United States |
| | Report |

Tulpar Stadium

14 July 2013
14:08

| Great Britain | 35–0 | China |
| | Report |

Tulpar Stadium

14 July 2013
14:30

| Italy | 14–17 | United States |
| | Report |

Tulpar Stadium

14 July 2013
17:04

| Great Britain | 24–19 | Italy |
| | Report |

Tulpar Stadium

14 July 2013
17:26

| Brazil | 10–26 | China |
| | Report |

Tulpar Stadium

15 July 2013
10:44

| Great Britain | 35–10 | Brazil |
| | Report |

Tulpar Stadium

15 July 2013
11:06

| United States | 0–24 | China |
| | Report |

Tulpar Stadium

15 July 2013
13:40

| Great Britain | 21–10 | United States |
| | Report |

Tulpar Stadium

15 July 2013
14:02

| Italy | 12–12 | Brazil |
| | Report |

Tulpar Stadium

== Classification ==
=== 9th-place game ===
16 July 2013
14:44

| Japan | 10–5 | United States |
| | Report |

Tulpar Stadium

== Elimination round ==
The elimination round will be split into three tiers: in descending order, the medal, plate, and bowl tiers. The top four finishers of each group in the preliminary round will move on to the medal tier of the elimination round for a chance to compete for medals, while the remaining two teams will play a classification game. The losers of the medal tier quarterfinals will play in the plate tier, and the losers of the plate tier semifinals will play in the bowl tier final.

=== Bowl tier ===
==== Final ====
17 July 2013
10:00

| Brazil | 0–21 | France |
| | Report |

Tulpar Stadium

=== Plate tier ===
Semifinals
B4 | Brazil | 12
B2 | China | 24
A4 | France | 14
A2 | Ukraine | 19

Final
B2 | China | 19
A2 | Ukraine | 15

==== Semifinals ====
16 July 2013
14:00

| Brazil | 12–24 | China |
| | Report |

Tulpar Stadium

16 July 2013
14:22

| France | 14–19 | Ukraine |
| | Report |

Tulpar Stadium

==== Final ====
17 July 2013
10:50

| China | 19–15 | Ukraine |
| | Report |

Tulpar Stadium

=== Medal tier ===
Quarterfinals
A1 | Russia | 31
B4 | Brazil | 0
B2 | China | 7
A3 | Canada | 33
B1 | Great Britain | 12
A4 | France | 7
A2 | Ukraine | 17
B3 | Italy | 19

Semifinals
A1 | Russia | 31
A3 | Canada | 5
B1 | Great Britain | 5
B3 | Italy | 14

Gold-medal game
A1 | Russia | 30
B3 | Italy | 10
Bronze-medal game
A3 | Canada | 36
B1 | Great Britain | 0

==== Quarterfinals ====
16 July 2013
10:00

| Russia | 31–0 | Brazil |
| | Report |

Tulpar Stadium

16 July 2013
10:22

| Great Britain | 12–7 | France |
| | Report |

Tulpar Stadium

16 July 2013
10:44

| China | 7–33 | Canada |
| | Report |

Tulpar Stadium

16 July 2013
11:06

| Ukraine | 17–19 | Italy |
| | Report |

Tulpar Stadium

==== Semifinals ====
16 July 2013
17:18

| Russia | 31–5 | Canada |
| | Report |

Tulpar Stadium

16 July 2013
17:40

| Great Britain | 5–14 | Italy |
| | Report |

Tulpar Stadium

==== Bronze-medal match ====
17 July 2013
11:40

| Canada | 36–0 | Great Britain |
| | Report |

Tulpar Stadium

==== Gold-medal match ====
17 July 2013
12:30

| Russia | 30–10 | Italy |
| | Report |

Tulpar Stadium

== Final standings ==
| Place | Team |
|---|---|
| 1st place, gold medalist(s) | Russia |
| 2nd place, silver medalist(s) | Italy |
| 3rd place, bronze medalist(s) | Canada |
| 4 | Great Britain |
| 5 | China |
| 6 | Ukraine |
| 7 | France |
| 8 | Brazil |
| 9 | Japan |
| 10 | United States |
