= Anderson Henriques =

Brazilian sprinter (born 1992)

Personal information
- Full name: Anderson Freitas Henriques
- Nationality: Brazil
- Born: 3 March 1992 (age 34) Caçapava do Sul, Rio Grande do Sul, Brazil
- Height: 1.83 m (6 ft 0 in)
- Weight: 77 kg (170 lb)

Sport
- Sport: Running
- Event: Sprints

Achievements and titles
- Personal best: 400 m: 44.95 (Moscow 2013)
Medal record
Men's athletics
Representing Brazil
World Relays
Silver medal – second place	2021 Chorzów	4×400 m relay mixed
Summer Universiade
Silver medal – second place	2013 Kazan	400 m
South American Games
Gold medal – first place	2014 Santiago	400 m
Gold medal – first place	2014 Santiago	4x400 m relay
Ibero-American Championships
Gold medal – first place	2012 Barquisimeto	400 m
South American Junior Championships
Gold medal – first place	2011 Medellín	400 m
Gold medal – first place	2011 Medellín	4×400 m relay
- Updated on 21 March 2014

Anderson Freitas Henriques (born 3 March 1992) is a Brazilian sprinter.

Anderson left his hometown, Caçapava do Sul, and moved to Porto Alegre in early 2010 when he was about to turn 18. It was when he began to take athletics more seriously, began to train in Sogipa, and discovered a vocation for the 400m. Anderson compensated for his late start with rapid growth. Now in his debut year, he completed the race in 46s24.

He won the gold medal in the 400 metres at the 2011 South American Junior Championships in Athletics in Medellín, Colombia.

At the 2011 Pan American Games in Guadalajara, he was a finalist, finishing 8th. If not for a fever of 38 degrees, Anderson would have fought for medals.

At the 2011 Universiade, in Shenzhen, he was a finalist, finishing in 7th place.

At the 2013 Universiade in Kazan, Anderson won the silver medal.

At the 2013 World Championships in Moscow, in the 400m, Henriques broke the 45-second barrier for the first time (he completed the distance in 44s95), and first came to a World Championships final.

He competed at the 2020 Summer Olympics.

== Personal bests ==
- 200 m: 20.85 s (wind: +1.2 m/s) – Oordegem, Belgium, 5 July 2014
- 400 m: 44.95 s (semi final) – Moscow, Russia, 12 August 2013
- 400 m (indoor): 46.82 s – Sopot, Poland, 7 March 2014

== International competitions ==
Year	Competition	Venue	Position	Event	Notes
Representing Brazil
2011	Pan American Junior Championships	Miramar, United States	9th (h)	200 m	21.38 s w (wind: +3.6 m/s)
2011	Pan American Junior Championships	Miramar, United States	3rd	400 m	46.69 s
2011	Universiade	Shenzhen, China	7th	400 m	46.01 s
2011	South American Junior Championships	Medellín, Colombia	1st	400 m	46.59 s A
2011	South American Junior Championships	Medellín, Colombia	1st	4 × 400 m relay	3:08.35 min A
2011	Pan American Games	Guadalajara, Mexico	8th	400 m	45.92 s A
2012	Ibero-American Championships	Barquisimeto, Venezuela	1st	400 m	45.59 s
2012	Ibero-American Championships	Barquisimeto, Venezuela	4th	4 × 400 m relay	3:03.05 min
2013	Universiade	Kazan, Russia	2nd	400 m	45.50 s
2013	World Championships	Moscow, Russia	8th	400 m	45.03 s
2013	World Championships	Moscow, Russia	7th	4 × 400 m relay	3:02.19 min
2014	World Indoor Championships	Sopot, Poland	4th (h)	400 m	46.82 s (indoor)
2014	South American Games	Santiago, Chile	1st	400 m	45.03 s
2014	South American Games	Santiago, Chile	1st	4 × 400 m relay	3:03.94 min
2014	Ibero-American Championships	São Paulo, Brazil	1st	400 m	45.40 s
2014	Ibero-American Championships	São Paulo, Brazil	2nd	4 × 400 m relay	3:02.80 min
2017	IAAF World Relays	Nassau, Bahamas	7th	4 × 400 m relay	3:05.96 min
2017	World Championships	London, United Kingdom	13th (h)	4 × 400 m relay	3:04.02 min
2019	South American Championships	Lima, Peru	3rd	400 m	46.15 s
2019	South American Championships	Lima, Peru	2nd	4 × 400 m relay	3:04.13
2020	South American Indoor Championships	Cochabamba, Bolivia	3rd	400 m	47.91
