= Athletics at the 2013 Summer Universiade – Women's pole vault =

The women's pole vault event at the 2013 Summer Universiade was held on 10 July.

== Results ==
| Rank | Athlete | Nationality | 3.50 | 3.70 | 3.85 | 4.00 | 4.10 | 4.20 | 4.30 | 4.40 | 4.50 | 4.60 | 4.70 | Result | Notes |
|---|---|---|---|---|---|---|---|---|---|---|---|---|---|---|---|
| 1st place, gold medalist(s) | Anastasia Savchenko | Russia | – | – | – | – | – | o | – | o | o | o | xxx | 4.60 | |
| 2nd place, silver medalist(s) | Martina Schultze | Germany | – | – | – | – | xo | – | xo | xxo | x– | xx | | 4.40 | =PB |
| 3rd place, bronze medalist(s) | Fanny Smets | Belgium | – | – | – | o | o | o | o | xxx | | | | 4.30 | =PB |
| 4 | Romana Maláčová | Czech Republic | – | – | – | – | xo | – | o | xxx | | | | 4.30 | |
| 5 | Katharina Bauer | Germany | – | – | – | – | – | o | xxo | xxx | | | | 4.30 | |
| 6 | Chloe Henry | Belgium | – | – | – | xxo | o | xxo | xxo | xxx | | | | 4.30 | |
| 7 | Aleksandra Kiryashova | Russia | – | – | – | – | – | o | – | xxx | | | | 4.20 | |
| 8 | Giorgia Benecchi | Italy | – | – | xo | o | – | o | xxx | | | | | 4.20 | |
| 9 | Stella-Iro Ledaki | Greece | – | – | – | – | xxo | xxx | | | | | | 4.10 | |
| 10 | Lindsey Bergevin | Canada | – | – | o | xo | xxx | | | | | | | 4.00 | |
| 11 | Robin Bone | Canada | – | – | o | xxx | | | | | | | | 3.85 | |
| 11 | Ildze Bortaščenoka | Latvia | o | o | o | xxx | | | | | | | | 3.85 | =SB |
| 11 | Lembi Vaher | Estonia | – | o | o | xxx | | | | | | | | 3.85 | |
| 14 | Ida Oesthus | Norway | o | xo | xxx | | | | | | | | | 3.70 | |
| 14 | Jerneja Writzl | Slovenia | o | xo | xxx | | | | | | | | | 3.70 | |
| 16 | Tiina Tikk | Estonia | xo | xxx | | | | | | | | | | 3.50 | |
