= Beach volleyball at the 2013 Summer Universiade – Women's tournament =

Men's Beach Volleyball at the XXVII Summer Universiade
- Venue: Kazanka Beach Volleyball Centre
- Dates: July 6–12
- Teams: 32

Medalists
1st place, gold medalist(s)		Ekaterina Khomyakova; Evgenia Ukolova	Russia
2nd place, silver medalist(s)		Kinga Kolosinska; Monika Brzostek	Poland
3rd place, bronze medalist(s)		Julia Sude; Chantal Laboureur	Germany

The women's tournament of Beach volleyball at the 2013 Summer Universiade in Kazan was held between July 6–12.

== Medalists ==
Gold	Silver	Bronze
Russia (RUS); Ekaterina Khomyakova; Evgenia Ukolova	Poland (POL); Kinga Kolosinska; Monika Brzostek	Germany (GER); Julia Sude; Chantal Laboureur

== Preliminary round ==
=== Group A ===
Pos	Team	Pld	W	L	Pts	SW	SL	SR	SPW	SPL	SPR
1	(Russia) Khomyakova–Ukolova	2	2	0	4	4	0	MAX	84	53	1.585
2	(France) Adelin–Longuet	2	1	1	3	2	2	1.000	70	76	0.921
3	(Belarus) Burak–Seryk	2	0	2	2	0	4	0.000	59	84	0.702

=== Group B ===
Pos	Team	Pld	W	L	Pts	SW	SL	SR	SPW	SPL	SPR
1	(Germany) Laboureur–Sude	2	2	0	4	4	0	MAX	84	52	1.615
2	(Canada) Cokrell–Sider	2	1	1	3	2	3	0.667	84	54	1.556
3	(Mexico) Meza–Barrgan	2	0	2	2	0	4	0.000	49	84	0.583

=== Group C ===
Pos	Team	Pld	W	L	Pts	SW	SL	SR	SPW	SPL	SPR
1	(Czech Republic) Kvapilova–Rehackova	2	2	0	4	4	0	MAX	84	54	1.556
2	(United States) Robinson–Ledoux	2	1	1	3	2	2	1.000	76	71	1.070
3	(Philippines) Ceballos–Gonzaga	2	0	2	2	0	4	0.000	49	84	0.583

=== Group D ===
Pos	Team	Pld	W	L	Pts	SW	SL	SR	SPW	SPL	SPR
1	(Canada) Humana Paredes–Pischke	2	2	0	4	4	1	4.000	95	72	1.319
2	(China) Huang–Xu	2	1	1	3	2	2	1.000	72	81	0.889
3	(Brazil) Ferreira–Alves	2	0	2	2	1	4	0.250	85	99	0.859

=== Group E ===
Pos	Team	Pld	W	L	Pts	SW	SL	SR	SPW	SPL	SPR
1	(Poland) Brzostek–Kolosinska	2	2	0	4	4	1	4.000	97	82	1.183
2	(Germany) Shneider–Mersmann	2	1	1	3	3	2	1.500	99	78	1.269
3	(China) Feng–Guo	2	0	2	2	0	4	0.000	48	84	0.571

=== Group F ===
Pos	Team	Pld	W	L	Pts	SW	SL	SR	SPW	SPL	SPR
1	(Thailand) Radarong–Udomchavee	2	2	0	4	4	0	MAX	84	53	1.585
2	(Portugal) Oliveira–Resende	2	1	1	3	2	2	1.000	63	82	0.768
3	(Austria) Jirak–Plesiutschnig	2	0	2	2	0	4	0.000	74	86	0.860

=== Group G ===
Pos	Team	Pld	W	L	Pts	SW	SL	SR	SPW	SPL	SPR
1	(United States) Carico–Stockman	3	3	0	6	6	1	6.000	145	93	1.559
2	(Russia) Popova–Prokopeva	3	2	1	5	5	2	2.500	141	103	1.369
3	(Norway) Predersen–Solvoll	3	1	2	4	2	4	0.500	95	102	0.931
4	(Brazil) da Silva–Silva	3	0	3	3	0	6	0.000	43	126	0.341

=== Group I ===
Pos	Team	Pld	W	L	Pts	SW	SL	SR	SPW	SPL	SPR
1	(Japan) Ishida–Mizoe	2	2	0	4	4	1	4.000	100	74	1.351
2	(Finland) Hyttinen–Lahti	2	1	1	3	3	2	1.500	99	70	1.414
3	(Australia) Houghton–Oconnor Williams	2	0	2	2	0	4	0.000	29	84	0.345

== Bracket ==
=== Winners Bracket ===
==== Top half ====
First round
1
16
(Australia) Hough-Oconn	3	2
(Portugal) Olive-Resen	21	21
(China) Huang-Xu	21	21
(Belarus) Burak-Seryk	14	13
4
13
6
11
(Philippines) Cebal-Gonza	0	0
(France) Adeli-Longu	21	21
(Germany) Schne-Mersm	21	21
(Mexico) Meza-Orell	10	19
2
15

Second round
(Russia) Khomi-Ukolo	21	21
(Portugal) Olive-Resen	16	11
(China) Huang-Xu	21	21
(Japan) Ishib-Mizoe	17	14
(Poland) Brzos-Kolos	21	21
(France) Adeli-Longu	19	12
(Germany) Schne-Mersm	15	17
(Canada) Human-Pisch

Third round
(Russia) Khami-Ukolo	21	21
(China) Huang-Xu	18	12
(Poland) Brzos-Kolos	27	21
(Canada) Human-Pisch	25	15

Fourth round
(Russia) Khomi-Ukolo	21	21
(Poland) Brzos-Kolos	14	13

==== Bottom half ====
First round
1
16
(Brazil) Ferre-Alves	16	20
(Russia) Propov-Proko	21	22
(Canada) Cockr-Sider	21	21
(China) Feng-Guo	12	19
4
13
6
11
(Austria) Jirak-Plesi	12	21	16
(United States) Robin-Ledou	21	14	14
(Finland) Hytti-Lahti	13	21	15
(Norway) Peder-Solvo	21	14	9
2
15

Second round
(Czech Republic) Kvapi-Rehac	16	21	13
(Russia) Popov-Proko	21	17	15
(Canada) Cockr-Sider	17	14
(Thailand) Radar-Udomic	21	21
(United States) Caric-Stock	21	21
(Austria) Jirak-Plesi	18	18
(Finland) Hytti-Lahti	14	14
(Germany) Labou-Sude	21	21

Third round
(Russia) Popov-Proko	19	20	10
(Thailand) Radar-Udomic	21	18	15
(United States) Caric-Stock	18	19
(Germany) Labou-Sude	21	21

Fourth round
(Thailand) Radar-Udomic	10	18
(Germany) Labou-Sude	21	21

=== Losers Bracket ===
==== 13th-24th place ====
17th-24th place
(Finland) Hytti-Lahti	21	21
(Australia) Hough-Oconn	11	8
(Belarus) Burak-Seryk	20	21	9
(Austria) Jirak-Plesi	22	19	15

13th-16th place
(Finland) Hytti-Lahti	21	22	7
(Austria) Jirak-Plesi	18	24	15

17th-24th place
(Canada) Cockr-Sider	21	21
(Philippines) Cebal-Gonza	15	11
(Mexico) Meza-Orell	23	16	7
(Czech Republic) Kvapi-Rehac	21	21	15

13th-16th place
(Canada) Cockr-Sider	21	20	9
(Czech Republic) Kvapi-Rehac	14	22	15

17th-24th place
(Germany) Schne-Mersm	24	21
(Brazil) Ferre-Alves	22	18
(China) Feng-Guo	8	6
(France) Adeli-Longu	21	21

13th-16th place
(Germany) Schne-Mersm	21	21
(France) Adeli-Longou	12	15

17th-24th place
(Japan) Ishid-Mizoe	17	13
(United States) Robin-Ledou	21	21
(Norway) Peder-Solvo	15	16
(Portugal) Olive-Resen	21	21

13th-16th place
(United States) Robin-Ledou	21	20	15
(Portugal) Olive-Resen	16	22	11

==== 7th-12th place ====
9th-12th place
(Austria) Jirak-Plesi	15	7
(Canada) Human-Pisch	21	21
(Czech Republic) Kvapi-Rehac	21	14	9
(China) Huang-XU	18	21	15

7th-8th place
(Canada) Human-Pisch	21	21
(China) Huang-Xu	18	19

17th-24th place
(Germany) Schne-Mersm	16	19
(United States) Caric-Stock	21	21
(United States) Robin-Ledou	19	10
(Russia) Popov-Proko	21	21

13th-16th place
(United States) Caric-Stock	14	19
(Russia) Popov-Proko	21	21

==== 5th-6th place ====
5th-6th place
(Thailand) Radar-Udomic	20	21	8
(Canada) Human-Pisch	22	19	15

5th-6th place
(Poland) Brzos-Kolos	21	22
(Russia) Popov-Proko	19	20

=== Finals ===
Semifinals
(Russia) Khomi-Ukolo	21	21
(Canada) Human-Pisch	18	19
(Germany) Labou-Sude	19	18
(Poland) Brzos-Kolos	21	21

Gold Medal
(Russia) Khomi-Ukolo	21	21
(Poland) Brzos-Kolos	19	17
Bronze Medal
(Canada) Human-Pisch	11	14
(Germany) Labou-Sude	21	21
