= Niculae Fulgeanu =

Romanian water polo player

Personal information
- Born: March 31, 1971 (age 53)

Sport
- Sport: Water polo

Niculae Fulgeanu (born 31 March 1971) is a Romanian former water polo player who competed in the 1996 Summer Olympics.
