= Pedro Luiz de Oliveira =

Brazilian sprinter

Personal information
- Full name: Pedro Luiz Burmann de Oliveira
- Born: February 17, 1992 (age 34) Porto Alegre, Brazil
- Height: 1.80 m (5 ft 11 in)
- Weight: 82 kg (181 lb)

Sport
- Sport: Athletics
- Event: 400 metres

Pedro Luiz Burmann de Oliveira (born 17 February 1992 in Porto Alegre) is a Brazilian sprinter specialising in the 400 metres. He represented his country at the 2013 and 2015 World Championships in Athletics. He competed at the 2020 Summer Olympics.

== International competitions ==
Year	Competition	Venue	Position	Event	Notes
Representing Brazil
2011	South American Junior Championships	Medellín, Colombia	1st	4 × 400 m relay	3:08.35
2012	Ibero-American Championships	Barquisimeto, Venezuela	4th	4 × 400 m relay	3:03.05
2012	South American U23 Championships	São Paulo, Brazil	1st	400 m	45.52
2012	South American U23 Championships	São Paulo, Brazil	1st	4 × 400 m relay	3:07.44
2013	Universiade	Kazan, Russia	–	200 m	DNF
2013	Universiade	Kazan, Russia	6th	400 m	45.96
2013	World Championships	Moscow, Russia	7th	4 × 400 m relay	3:02.19
2014	IAAF World Relays	Nassau, Bahamas	7th	4 × 400 m relay	3:03.87
2014	Ibero-American Championships	São Paulo, Brazil	2nd	400 m	45.73
2014	Ibero-American Championships	São Paulo, Brazil	2nd	4 × 400 m relay	3:02.80
2014	Pan American Sports Festival	Mexico City, Mexico	5th	400 m	45.69
2015	IAAF World Relays	Nassau, Bahamas	5th	4 × 400 m relay	3:00.96
2015	Pan American Games	Toronto, Canada	5th	4 × 400 m relay	3:01.18
2015	World Championships	Beijing, China	12th (h)	4 × 400 m relay	3:01.05
2016	Ibero-American Championships	Rio de Janeiro, Brazil	3rd	400 m	45.69
2016	Ibero-American Championships	Rio de Janeiro, Brazil	–	4 × 400 m relay	DQ
2016	Olympic Games	Rio de Janeiro, Brazil	8th	4 × 400 m relay	3:03.28

== Personal bests ==
Outdoor

- 200 metres – 20.81 (+0.8 m/s, São Paulo 2013)
- 400 metres – 45.52 (São Paulo 2012)
