= Gymnastics at the 2013 Summer Universiade – Men's artistic team all-around =

The Men's Artistic Team All-Around at the 2013 Summer Universiade was both the qualification round and the team final for the competition. It served as the basis by which the team ranks were decided and the basis upon which gymnasts qualified for all-around and event finals. The first subdivision took place at 10:00 MSK, the second at 11:40 MSK, the third at 15:00 MSK, the fourth at 16:40 MSK, and the fifth at 18:20 MSK. The award ceremony for the team title was at 20:00 MSK.

== Subdivisions ==
Gymnasts from nations taking part in the team all-around event were grouped together while the other gymnasts were grouped together into one of five mixed groups.

=== Subdivision 1: Mixed ===
- Filip Ude (CRO)
- Tomislav Markovic (CRO)
- Rohan Sebastian (IRL)
- Erdenebold Ganbar (MGL)
- Christian Decidet (CHI)
- Juan Raffo (CHI)
- Ruslan Namazov (AZE)
- Ferhat Arican (TUR)
- Slavomir Michnak (SVK)
- Sergejs Kalitonciks (LAT)
- Maxime Gentges (BEL)
- Thomas Neuteleers (BEL)
- Tarik Soto Byfield (CRC)
- Salohiddin Mirzaev (UZB)
- Eduard Shaulov (UZB)
- Joao Fuglsig (DEN)

=== Subdivision 2 ===
- Norway
- Mexico
- Vietnam
- Chinese Taipei
- Singapore
- New Zealand

=== Subdivision 3 ===
- Italy
- Slovenia
- Kazakhstan
- Portugal
- Hungary
- Finland

=== Subdivision 4 ===
- Switzerland
- South Korea
- Germany
- Brazil
- Great Britain
- France

=== Subdivision 5 ===
- Russia
- Ukraine
- China
- Canada
- Japan
- Romania

== Qualification and Team Final Results ==
Team	Floor (gymnastics)		Pommel horse		Rings (gymnastics)		Vault (gymnastics)		Parallel bars		Horizontal bar		Total (All-around)	
Team	Score	Rank	Score	Rank	Score	Rank	Score	Rank	Score	Rank	Score	Rank	Score	Rank
Russia	46.050	1	45.350	2	46.100	1	45.450	1	46.350	2	43.850	2	273.150	1
Ukraine	43.950	4	45.950	1	45.150	2	44.700	3	46.400	1	43.800	3	269.950	2
Japan	45.100	2	44.550	3	44.700	3	44.150	4	46.200	3	45.000	1	269.700	3
Germany	44.100	3	42.050	7	43.750	5	43.850	7	43.150	9	43.600	4	260.500	4
Brazil	43.900	6	43.950	4	44.100	4	41.350	19	43.600	7	43.350	6	260.250	5
China	41.000	15	41.900	8	43.550	6	44.150	4	45.900	4	43.400	5	259.900	6
