= Fanny Smets =

Belgian pole vaulter

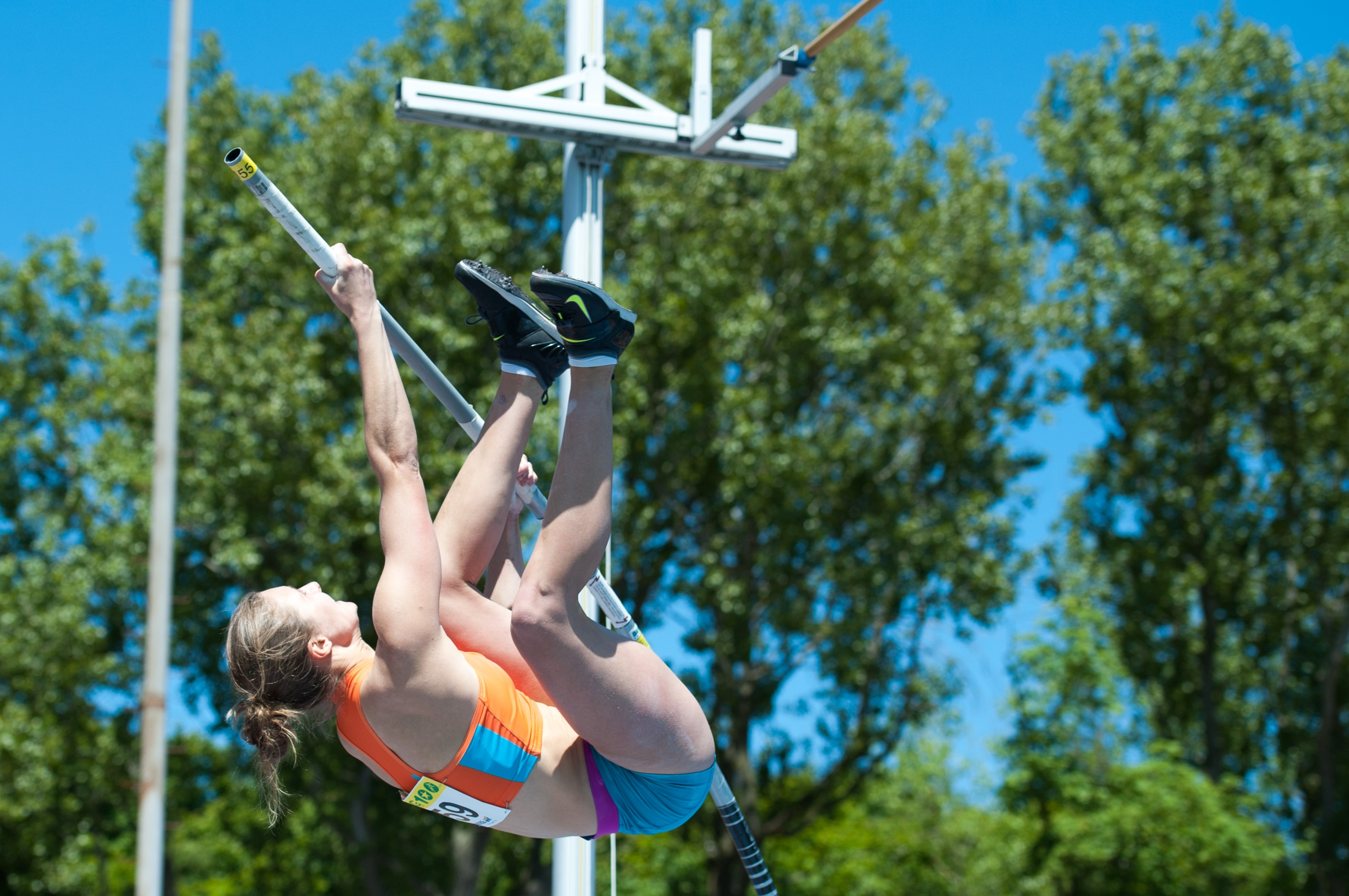
- Fanny Smets in 2013

Personal information
- Nationality: Belgian
- Born: 21 April 1986 (age 40)

Sport
- Sport: Athletics
- Event: Pole vault

Fanny Smets (born 21 April 1986) is a Belgian pole vaulter. She competed in the women's pole vault at the 2017 World Championships in Athletics.

== International competitions ==
| Year | Competition | Venue | Position | Notes |
Representing Belgium
| 2013 | Universiade | Kazan, Russia | 3rd | 4.30 m |
| 2013 | Jeux de la Francophonie | Nice, France | 2nd | 4.40 m |
| 2016 | European Championships | Amsterdam, Netherlands | 19th (q) | 4.35 m |
| 2017 | World Championships | London, United Kingdom | 20th (q) | 4.20 m |
| 2019 | World Championships | Doha, Qatar | 20th (q) | 4.50 m |
| 2021 | European Indoor Championships | Toruń, Poland | 7th | 4.45 m |
| 2021 | Olympic Games | Tokyo, Japan | 27th (q) | 4.25 m |
