= Sedrick Rowe =

American farmer and researcher

- Born: 1990 or 1991 (age 35–36)
- Education: Fort Valley State University
- Occupation: Farmer
- Political party: Democratic
- Website: roweforgeorgia.com

Sedrick Rowe Jr. (born 1990 or 1991) is an American farmer and researcher who grows organic peanuts in the state of Georgia. He began farming as a student at Fort Valley State University and was involved in the federal government as part of the Advisory Committee on Minority Farmers under Tom Vilsack. He ran unsuccessfully in the Democratic primary for the 2026 Georgia Agriculture Commissioner election.

== Early life and education ==
Rowe grew up in Albany, Georgia, and attended Fort Valley State University, where he played college football as a running back. As a senior, he began working on an organic farm that was at the school and graduated with a bachelor's degree in plant science.

== Farming career ==
Rowe began his own farm in Albany in 2018, growing organic peanuts. He became part of Georgia's first group of licensed hemp farmers in 2020, following the signing of the Hemp Farming Act by Brian Kemp. Rowe opened his farm in 2020, and held an education course on how to grow hemp in early 2021. It was around this time that he founded the Southern Georgia Young Farmers Coalition after returning from a National Young Farmers Coalition in Colorado.

While farming peanuts, Rowe also worked towards a PhD in soil health. His organic peanut farm is one of few in the state, with the practice described as a "drop in the bucket" of the state's overall production.

== Political career ==
Under former United States Secretary of Agriculture Tom Vilsack, Rowe was appointed to the Advisory Committee on Minority Farmers, though the committee was paused following the election of Donald Trump in 2024.

=== 2026 Georgia Agriculture Commissioner election ===
Rowe qualified to run in the Democratic primary for the 2026 Georgia Agriculture Commissioner election in March 2026. He pledged to promote organic row crop farming.
