= Jeremy Rae =

Canadian middle-distance runner

Personal information
- Born: May 19, 1991 (age 35) Fort Erie, Ontario, Canada
- Height: 5 ft 10 in (178 cm)
- Weight: 150 lb (68 kg)

Sport
- Sport: Track
- Event: 1500 meters
- College team: Notre Dame

Achievements and titles
- Personal best(s): 1500 meters: 3:36.85; Indoor mile: 3:57.25
Medal record
Men's athletics
Representing Canada
Universiade
Silver medal – second place	2013 Kazan	1500 m
- Updated on July 22, 2015

Jeremy Nicholas Rae (born May 19, 1991) is a Canadian middle-distance track athlete. Rae competed for Notre Dame during his collegiate career. He holds various school records and won an NCAA Championship in the Distance Medley Relay in 2012. Rae has also represented Canada internationally in various world track meets. Jeremy is now a professional cyclist, attempting the Canadian everesting record. He is based out of Hamilton, Ontario and organizes a ride for elite cyclists in the Hamilton-Wentworth area called "Durand".

== Running career ==
=== High school ===
Rae attended Lakeshore Catholic High School in Ontario for which he set the Penn Relays high school record in the 1600 meters with a time of 4:08 (min:sec). While still in high school, Rae finished in second place in the 1500 meters at the 2009 Pan American Junior Athletics Championships.

=== Collegiate and international ===
Rae was recruited by Notre Dame. Rae finished in fifth place overall for the 1500 meters at the 2013 NCAA DI Outdoor T&F Championships. Just a month after the NCAA Outdoor Championships, Rae represented Canada at the 2013 Summer Universiade, finishing second to Valentin Smirnov, earning a silver medal from the men's 1500 meter.

On February 7, 2014, Rae won Note Dame's Meyo Invitational mile race in a time of 3:57.25, breaking Notre Dame's previous mile record of 3:57.83 set by Luke Watson in 2002. At the 2014 NCAA DI Indoor T&F Championships, Rae finished the indoor mile finals in ninth place.
