= Fabrizio Gabriele =

Italian rower

Medal record

Men's rowing

Representing Italy

World Rowing Championships
Gold medal – first place	2005 Gifu	LM8+
Gold medal – first place	2006 Eton	LM8+
Silver medal – second place	2004 Banyoles	LM8+
Silver medal – second place	2011 Bled	LM8+
Bronze medal – third place	2007 Munich	LM8+

Fabrizio Gabriele (born 11 May 1985 in Naples) is an Italian rower. He won two gold medals at the World Rowing Championships.
