= Volleyball at the 2013 Summer Universiade – Men's tournament =

Men's indoor volleyball at the XXVII Summer Universiade
- Venue: various
- Dates: 6–16 July
- Teams: 21

Medalists
1st place, gold medalist(s)		Russia (RUS)
2nd place, silver medalist(s)		Poland (POL)
3rd place, bronze medalist(s)		Japan (JPN)

The men's tournament of volleyball at the 2013 Summer Universiade was held from 6 to 16 July in Kazan, Russia.

== Preliminary round ==
The draw is as follows:

=== Group A ===
Pos	Team	Pld	W	L	Pts	SW	SL	SR	SPW	SPL	SPR	Qualification
1	Russia	5	5	0	14	15	2	7.500	407	304	1.339	Quarterfinals
2	South Korea	5	4	1	12	12	4	3.000	382	332	1.151	Quarterfinals
3	Belarus	5	3	2	10	12	6	2.000	406	361	1.125	9th–16th place
4	Estonia	5	2	3	6	6	9	0.667	336	340	0.988	9th–16th place
5	Hong Kong	5	1	4	3	3	13	0.231	310	391	0.793	17th–21st place
6	United States	5	0	5	0	1	15	0.067	289	402	0.719	17th–21st place

Date	Time		Score		Set 1	Set 2	Set 3	Set 4	Set 5	Total	Report
6 July	10:00	Hong Kong	0–3	Belarus	17–25	21–25	10–25			48–75	48–75
6 July	12:00	United States	0–3	Estonia	22–25	17–25	18–25			57–75	P2 P3
6 July	14:00	Russia	3–0	South Korea	25-21	25-16	25-20			75–0	P2 P3
7 July	18:00	Belarus	3–0	United States	25–18	25–15	25–20			75–53	P2 P3
7 July	20:00	South Korea	3–0	Estonia	25–23	26–24	25–23			76–70	P2 P3
7 July	20:00	Russia	3–0	Hong Kong	26–24	25–12	25–15			76–51	P2 P3
8 July	18:00	Estonia	0–3	Belarus	17–25	19–25	19–25			55–75	P2 P3
8 July	20:00	Hong Kong	0–3	South Korea	16–25	22–25	14–25			52–75	P2 P3
8 July	19:00	United States	0–3	Russia	13–25	18–25	9–25			40–75	P2 P3
10 July	15:00	Hong Kong	3–1	United States	25–18	27–29	25–23	25–20		102–90	P2 P3
10 July	20:00	South Korea	3–1	Belarus	25–20	24–26	25–23	25–17		99–86	P2 P3
10 July	20:00	Russia	3–0	Estonia	25–18	25–22	25–21			75–61	P2 P3
11 July	15:00	United States	0–3	South Korea	13–25	14–25	22–25			49–75	P2 P3
11 July	18:00	Estonia	3–0	Hong Kong	25–22	25–18	25–17			75–57	P2 P3
11 July	20:00	Belarus	2–3	Russia	25–22	17–25	22–25	25–19	6–15	95–106	P2 P3

=== Group B ===
Pos	Team	Pld	W	L	Pts	SW	SL	SR	SPW	SPL	SPR	Qualification
1	Ukraine	3	3	0	8	9	3	3.000	287	250	1.148	Quarterfinals
2	Japan	3	1	2	5	7	6	1.167	281	278	1.011	Quarterfinals
3	Thailand	3	1	2	3	6	8	0.750	298	299	0.997	9th–16th place
4	Latvia	3	1	2	2	3	8	0.375	213	252	0.845	9th–16th place

Date	Time		Score		Set 1	Set 2	Set 3	Set 4	Set 5	Total	Report
6 July	13:00	Latvia	0–3	Ukraine	19–25	20–25	14–25			53–75	53–75
7 July	18:00	Ukraine	3–1	Thailand	27–25	25–15	21–25	25–23		98–88	98–88
8 July	18:00	Latvia	0–3	Japan	17–25	12–25	25–27			54–77	54–77
10 July	15:00	Latvia	3–2	Thailand	25–18	23–25	25–22	18–25	15–10	106–100	106–100
10 July	18:00	Japan	2–3	Ukraine	25–23	21–25	25–21	20–25	18–20	109–114	109–114
11 July	20:00	Thailand	3–2	Japan	24–26	25–21	25–14	21–25	15–9	110–95	P2 P3

=== Group C ===
Pos	Team	Pld	W	L	Pts	SW	SL	SR	SPW	SPL	SPR	Qualification
1	Poland	5	5	0	14	15	2	7.500	412	290	1.421	Quarterfinals
2	Brazil	5	4	1	12	12	5	2.400	415	330	1.258	Quarterfinals
3	Switzerland	5	3	2	8	10	9	1.111	425	393	1.081	9th–16th place
4	Australia	5	2	3	8	11	9	1.222	431	422	1.021	9th–16th place
5	China	5	1	4	3	4	13	0.308	324	397	0.816	17th–21st place
6	Macau	5	0	5	0	1	15	0.067	219	394	0.556	17th–21st place

Date	Time		Score		Set 1	Set 2	Set 3	Set 4	Set 5	Total	Report
6 July	11:00	Australia	2–3	Switzerland	26–24	22–25	18–25	25–22	10–15	101–111	P2 P3
6 July	11:00	Macau	0–3	Brazil	10–25	11–25	16–25			37–75	P2 P3
6 July	13:00	Poland	3–0	China	25–19	25–13	25–10			75–42	P2 P3
7 July	15:00	Brazil	3–0	China	25–15	25–16	25–18			75–49	P2 P3
7 July	15:00	Macau	0–3	Australia	10–25	17–25	15–25			42–75	P2 P3
7 July	18:00	Switzerland	0–3	Poland	17–25	19–25	17–25			53–75	P2 P3
8 July	13:00	Australia	1–3	Brazil	17–25	26–28	28–26	13–25		84–104	P2 P3
8 July	13:00	China	1–3	Switzerland	30–28	21–25	18–25	15–25		84–103	P2 P3
8 July	13:00	Poland	3–0	Macau	25–6	25–11	25–17			75–34	P2 P3
10 July	13:00	Brazil	3–1	Switzerland	25–23	25–21	21–25	25–14		96–83	P2 P3
10 July	15:00	Macau	1–3	China	22–25	14–25	25–19	8–25		69–94	P2 P3
10 July	18:00	Australia	2–3	Poland	25–22	25–23	14–25	19–25	13–15	96–110	P2 P3
11 July	13:00	China	0–3	Australia	20–25	17–25	18–25			55–75	P2 P3
11 July	18:00	Poland	3–0	Brazil	27–25	25–23	25–17			77–65	P2 P3
11 July	18:00	Switzerland	3–0	Macau	25–13	25–13	25–11			75–37	P2 P3

=== Group D ===
Pos	Team	Pld	W	L	Pts	SW	SL	SR	SPW	SPL	SPR	Qualification
1	Czech Republic	4	3	1	9	10	4	2.500	329	302	1.089	Quarterfinals
2	Canada	4	3	1	9	10	5	2.000	355	311	1.141	Quarterfinals
3	Mexico	4	2	2	6	8	7	1.143	351	345	1.017	9th–16th place
4	Chile	4	2	2	6	7	7	1.000	324	315	1.029	9th–16th place
5	United Arab Emirates	4	0	4	0	0	12	0.000	217	303	0.716	17th–21st place

Date	Time		Score		Set 1	Set 2	Set 3	Set 4	Set 5	Total	Report
6 July	11:00	Mexico	3–1	Chile	25-22	25-20	19-25	25-22		94–0	P2 P3
6 July	13:00	United Arab Emirates	0–3	Canada	14-25	16-25	16-25			46–0	P2 P3
7 July	18:00	Canada	3–1	Mexico	21–25	28–26	25–22	25–18		99–91	P2 P3
7 July	20:00	Czech Republic	3–0	United Arab Emirates	25–19	25–14	25–18			75–51	P2 P3
8 July	15:00	Chile	3–1	Canada	25–20	19–25	25–17	25–22		94–84	P2 P3
8 July	15:00	Mexico	1–3	Czech Republic	20–25	21–25	26–24	22–25		89–99	P2 P3
10 July	13:00	Czech Republic	3–0	Chile	25–23	25–20	25–22			75–65	P2 P3
10 July	13:00	United Arab Emirates	0–3	Mexico	13–25	25–27	20–25			58–77	P2 P3
11 July	20:00	Canada	3–1	Czech Republic	26–24	25–14	21–25	25–17		97–80	P2 P3
11 July	20:00	Chile	3–0	United Arab Emirates	26–24	25–20	25–18			76–62	P2 P3

== Classification rounds ==
=== Quarterfinal round ===
==== 17th–21st place ====
Date	Time		Score		Set 1	Set 2	Set 3	Set 4	Set 5	Total	Report
13 July	13:00	Hong Kong	3–0	Macau	25–14	25–13	25–14			75–41	P2 P3

==== 9th–16th place ====
Date	Time		Score		Set 1	Set 2	Set 3	Set 4	Set 5	Total	Report
13 July	13:00	Belarus	3–0	Australia	25–20	25–17	25–16			75–53	P2 P3
13 July	15:00	Mexico	1–3	Latvia	19–25	20–25	25–20	21–25		85–95	P2 P3
13 July	18:00	Switzerland	0–3	Estonia	19–25	19–25	22–25			60–75	P2 P3
13 July	20:00	Thailand	1–3	Chile	17–25	22–25	25–21	21–25		85–96	P2 P3

=== Semifinal round ===
==== 17th–20th place ====
Date	Time		Score		Set 1	Set 2	Set 3	Set 4	Set 5	Total	Report
13 July	15:00	China	3–1	United States	25–14	25–19	23–25	25–21		98–79	P2 P3
14 July	15:00	Hong Kong	3–1	United Arab Emirates	25–19	25–22	21–25	25–22		96–88	P2 P3

==== 13th–16th place ====
Date	Time		Score		Set 1	Set 2	Set 3	Set 4	Set 5	Total	Report
14 July	18:00	Australia	1–3	Mexico	32–30	24–26	21–25	21–25		98–106	P2 P3
14 July	20:00	Switzerland	0–3	Thailand	22–25	21–25	19–25			62–75	P2 P3

==== 9th–12th place ====
Date	Time		Score		Set 1	Set 2	Set 3	Set 4	Set 5	Total	Report
14 July	18:00	Belarus	3–1	Latvia	23–25	25–17	25–20	25–20		98–82	P2 P3
14 July	20:00	Estonia	3–1	Chile	25–18	25–16	23–25	25–20		98–79	P2 P3

==== 5th–8th place ====
Date	Time		Score		Set 1	Set 2	Set 3	Set 4	Set 5	Total	Report
14 July	13:00	South Korea	2–3	Canada	21–25	25–15	25–19	16–25	8–15	95–99	P2 P3
14 July	15:00	Brazil	0–3	Czech Republic	20–25	20–25	22–25			62–75	P2 P3

=== Final round ===
==== 19th place game ====
Date	Time		Score		Set 1	Set 2	Set 3	Set 4	Set 5	Total	Report
14 July	13:00	Macau	1–3	United States	24–26	21–25	25–17	20–25		90–93	P2 P3

==== 17th place game ====
Date	Time		Score		Set 1	Set 2	Set 3	Set 4	Set 5	Total	Report
15 July	13:00	China	3–1	Hong Kong	14–25	28–26	25–18	25–23		92–92	P2 P3

==== 15th place game ====
Date	Time		Score		Set 1	Set 2	Set 3	Set 4	Set 5	Total	Report
15 July	15:00	Australia	3–0	Switzerland	25–23	25–21	25–21			75–65	P2 P3

==== 13th place game ====
Date	Time		Score		Set 1	Set 2	Set 3	Set 4	Set 5	Total	Report
15 July	17:00	Mexico	1–3	Thailand	18–25	25–23	16–25	22–25		81–98	P2 P3

==== 11th place game ====
Date	Time		Score		Set 1	Set 2	Set 3	Set 4	Set 5	Total	Report
15 July	15:00	Latvia	3–0	Chile	25–21	25–16	25–23			75–60	P2 P3

==== 9th place game ====
Date	Time		Score		Set 1	Set 2	Set 3	Set 4	Set 5	Total	Report
15 July	17:00	Belarus	3–1	Estonia	25–20	25–23	22–25	25–21		97–89	P2 P3

==== 7th place game ====
Date	Time		Score		Set 1	Set 2	Set 3	Set 4	Set 5	Total	Report
15 July	13:00	Brazil	3–1	South Korea	25–16	25–22	30–32	25–21		105–91	P2 P3

==== 5th place game ====
Date	Time		Score		Set 1	Set 2	Set 3	Set 4	Set 5	Total	Report
15 July	15:00	Czech Republic	0–3	Canada	20–25	25–27	17–25			62–77	P2 P3

== Final round ==
Quarterfinals
A1	Russia	3
C2	Brazil	0
D1	Czech Republic	1
B2	Japan	3
C1	Poland	3
A2	South Korea	2
B1	Ukraine	3
D2	Canada	0

Semifinals
A1	Russia	3
B2	Japan	1
C1	Poland	3
B1	Ukraine	2

Gold Medal Match
A1	Russia	3
C1	Poland	0
Bronze Medal Match
B2	Japan	3
B1	Ukraine	0

=== Quarterfinals ===
Date	Time		Score		Set 1	Set 2	Set 3	Set 4	Set 5	Total	Report
13 July	13:00	Poland	3–2	South Korea	22–25	25–20	23–25	25–23	22–20	117–113	P2 P3
13 July	18:00	Ukraine	3–0	Canada	25–21	25–23	25–23			75–67	P2 P3
13 July	20:00	Russia	3–0	Brazil	25–19	25–12	25–14			75–45	P2 P3
13 July	20:00	Czech Republic	1–3	Japan	21–25	25–22	23–25	24–26		93–98	P2 P3

=== Semifinals ===
Date	Time		Score		Set 1	Set 2	Set 3	Set 4	Set 5	Total	Report
14 July	18:00	Poland	3–2	Ukraine	26–24	25–27	25–18	22–25	15–8	113–102	P2 P3
14 July	20:00	Russia	3–1	Japan	25–15	25–10	22–25	25–22		97–72	P2 P3

=== Bronze-medal match ===
Date	Time		Score		Set 1	Set 2	Set 3	Set 4	Set 5	Total	Report
16 July	17:00	Japan	3–0	Ukraine	25–15	26–24	25–23			76–62	P2 P3

=== Gold-medal match ===
Date	Time		Score		Set 1	Set 2	Set 3	Set 4	Set 5	Total	Report
16 July	20:00	Russia	3–0	Poland	25–22	25–19	25–19			75–60	P2 P3

== Final standings ==
Place	Team	Score
1st place, gold medalist(s)	Russia	8–0
2nd place, silver medalist(s)	Poland	7–1
3rd place, bronze medalist(s)	Japan	3–3
4	Ukraine	4–2
5	Canada	5–2
6	Czech Republic	4–3
7	Brazil	5–3
8	South Korea	4–4
9	Belarus	6–2
10	Estonia	4–4
11	Latvia	3–3
12	Chile	3–4
13	Thailand	3–3
14	Mexico	3–4
15	Australia	3–5
16	Switzerland	3–5
17	China	3–4
18	Hong Kong	3–5
19	United States	1–6
20	Macau	0–7
21	United Arab Emirates	0–5
