= Raketa Stadium =

Sports venue in Kazan, Tatarstan, Russia

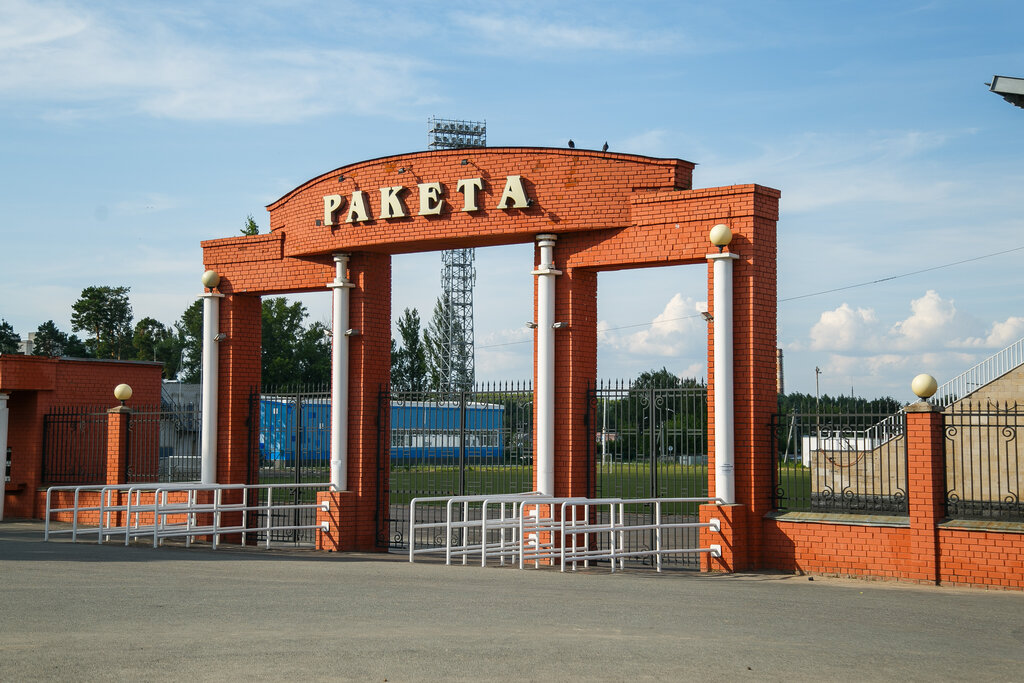
- Interactive map of Raketa Stadium
- Location: Kazan, Russia
- Coordinates: 55.8722°N 49.2311°E
- Capacity: 7,500

Construction
- Opened: 1947

Tenant
- Dynamo Kazan

Raketa Stadium is a sports venue in Kazan. It is the home of Ak Bars-Raketa.

== History ==
- Stadium was built in 1947.
- In 2000 the stadium hosted the Russian Government Cup.
- Hosted the 2005 and 2011 Bandy World Championships.
