= Tyler Harper =

American politician (born 1986)

- Official portrait, 2018

Agriculture Commissioner of Georgia
- Incumbent
- Assumed office January 12, 2023
- Governor: Brian Kemp
- Preceded by: Gary Black

Member of the Georgia Senate from the 7th district
- In office January 14, 2013 – January 9, 2023
- Preceded by: Greg Goggans
- Succeeded by: Nabilah Islam

Personal details
- Born: April 19, 1986 (age 40) Irwin County, Georgia, U.S.
- Party: Republican
- Education: Abraham Baldwin Agricultural College (attended); University of Georgia (BS)
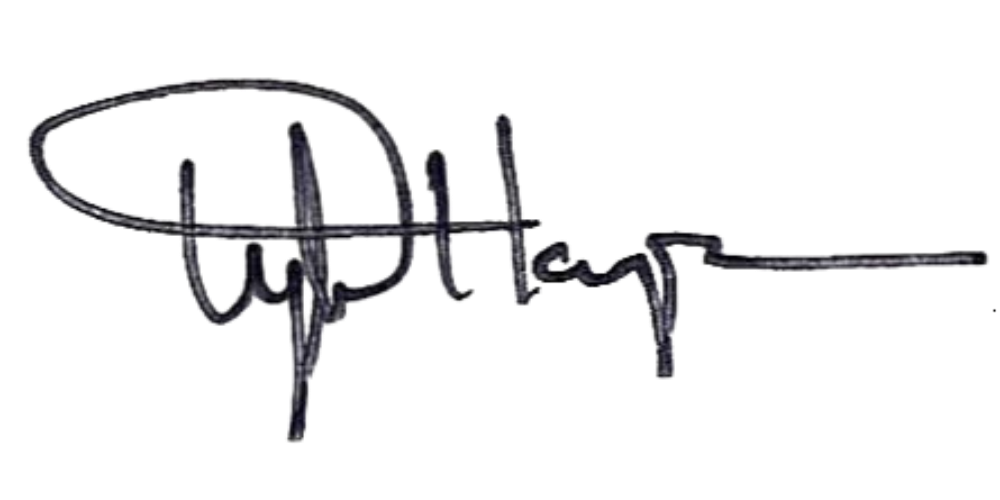
- Signature
- Website: Office website Campaign website

Tyler J. Harper (born April 19, 1986) is an American politician who serves as the Agriculture Commissioner of Georgia since 2023. He previously served in the Georgia State Senate representing the 7th district from 2013 to 2023.

== Background ==
A native of Ocilla, Georgia, Harper is a 7th generation South Georgia farmer who runs a peanut, cotton, beef cattle, and timber operation on the same land his family has farmed for over 125 years.

== Georgia Senate ==
While in the Senate, he served as Chairman of the Natural Resources and the Environment Committee and Vice Chairman of the Public Safety Committee. He was also a member of the Appropriations Committee and Agriculture and Consumer Affairs Committee.

== Georgia Agriculture Commissioner ==
On June 29, 2021, Harper announced his campaign for Georgia Commissioner of Agriculture. On May 24, 2022, Harper won the Republican primary for State Agriculture Commissioner in which he was running unopposed. He was endorsed by former Governor Roy Barnes, a Democrat.

Harper won against a Democrat, a Libertarian, and an independent in the November 8, 2022 general election. Running for re-election on November 3, 2026, Harper lost to Democratic challenger Katherine Juhan-Arnold.

Party political offices
Preceded by Gary Black	Republican nominee for Agriculture Commissioner of Georgia; 2022, 2026	Most recent
Political offices
Preceded by Gary Black	Agriculture Commissioner of Georgia; 2023–present	Incumbent
