= South Africa at the 2013 Summer Universiade =

- IOC code: RSA

in Kazan
- Competitors: 121
- Medals Ranked 8th: Gold 7 Silver 5 Bronze 2 Total 14

Summer Universiade appearances
- 1959; 1961; 1963; 1965; 1967; 1970; 1973; 1975; 1977; 1979; 1981; 1983; 1985; 1987; 1989; 1991; 1993; 1995; 1997; 1999; 2001; 2003; 2005; 2007; 2009; 2011; 2013; 2015; 2017; 2019; 2021

South Africa competed at the 2013 Summer Universiade in Kazan, Russia from 6 July to 17 July 2013. 121 athletes were part of the South African team.

In the games, South Africa won 13 medals (22nd place), including 7 gold medals (8th place).
