= Brazil at the FISU World University Games =

Brazil at the Universiade
- IOC code: BRA
- NOC: Brazilian University Sports Confederation
- Website: www.cbdu.org.br
- Medals Ranked 22nd: Gold 41 Silver 55 Bronze 116 Total 212

Summer appearances
- 1959; 1961; 1963; 1965; 1967; 1970; 1973; 1975; 1977; 1979; 1981; 1983; 1985; 1987; 1989; 1991; 1993; 1995; 1997; 1999; 2001; 2003; 2005; 2007; 2009; 2011; 2013; 2015; 2017; 2019; 2021; 2025

Winter appearances
- 1968; 1970; 1972; 1975; 1978; 1981; 1983; 1985; 1987; 1989; 1991; 1993; 1995; 1997; 1999; 2001; 2003; 2005; 2007; 2009; 2011; 2013; 2015; 2017; 2019; 2023

Brazil is 23th on the all time medal table in Summer Universiade. Brazil hasn't won any medal in Winter Universiade.The country is a traditional stakeholder at the FISU World University Games and has participated on all the Summer Games editions.The country also hosted the 1963 Summer Universiade held in Porto Alegre.

== Medal count ==
=== Summer Universiade ===
Host nation

Edition				
(Italy) Turin 1959	0	0	0	0
(Bulgaria) Sofia 1961	0	0	0	0
(Brazil) Porto Alegre 1963	2	0	9	11
(Hungary) Budapest 1965	0	0	0	0
(Japan) Tokyo 1967	0	0	4	4
(Italy) Turin 1970	0	0	0	0
(Soviet Union) Moscow 1973	0	0	5	5
(Italy) Rome 1975	0	0	0	0
(Bulgaria) Sofia 1977	1	0	0	1
Mexico City 1979	1	2	0	3
(Romania) Bucarest 1981	0	3	10	13
(Canada) Edmonton 1983	1	0	2	3
(Japan) Kobe 1985	1	2	2	5
(Socialist Federal Republic of Yugoslavia) Zagreb 1987	0	1	0	1
(West Germany) Duisburg 1989	1	1	0	2
(United Kingdom) Sheffield 1991	0	0	0	0
(United States) Buffalo 1993	0	1	0	1
(Japan) Fukuoka 1995	2	5	2	9
(Italy) Sicily 1997	3	2	1	6
(Spain) Palma de Mallorca 1999	2	0	5	7
(China) Beijing 2001	2	3	2	7
(South Korea) Daegu 2003	1	2	8	11
(Turkey) Ízmir 2005	4	2	9	15
(Thailand) Bangkok 2007	1	3	6	10
(Serbia) Belgrade 2009	2	2	2	6
(China) Shenzhen 2011	2	4	13	19
(Russia) Kazan 2013	4	3	4	11
(South Korea) Gwangju 2015	2	2	4	8
(Chinese Taipei) Taipei 2017	2	4	6	12
(Italy) Naples 2019	5	3	9	17
(China) Chengdu 2021	0	7	6	13
(Germany) Rhine-Rühr 2025	2	3	7	12
(South Korea) Chungcheong 2027	Future event			
(United States) North Carolina 2029	Future event			
Total	41	55	116	212

=== Winter Universiade ===
Edition				
(France) Chamonix 1960	0	0	0	0
(Switzerland) Villars 1962	0	0	0	0
(Czech Republic) Špindlerův Mlýn 1964	0	0	0	0
(Italy) Sestriere 1966	0	0	0	0
(Austria) Innsbruck 1968	0	0	0	0
(Finland) Rovaniemi 1970	0	0	0	0
(United States) Lake Placid 1972	0	0	0	0
(Italy) Livigno 1975	0	0	0	0
(Czech Republic) Špindlerův Mlýn 1978	0	0	0	0
(Spain) Jaca 1981	0	0	0	0
(Bulgaria) Sofia 1983	0	0	0	0
(Italy) Belluno 1985	0	0	0	0
(Czech Republic) Štrbské Pleso 1987	0	0	0	0
(Bulgaria) Sofia 1989	0	0	0	0
(Japan) Sapporo 1991	0	0	0	0
(Poland) Zakopane 1993	0	0	0	0
(Spain) Jaca 1995	0	0	0	0
(South Korea) Muju/Jeonju 1997	0	0	0	0
(Slovakia) Poprad Tatry 1999	0	0	0	0
(Poland) Zakopane 2001	0	0	0	0
(Italy) Tarvisio 2003	0	0	0	0
(Austria) Innsbruck/Seefeld 2005	0	0	0	0
(Italy) Turin 2007	0	0	0	0
(China) Harbin 2009	0	0	0	0
(Turkey) Erzurum 2011	0	0	0	0
(Italy) Trentino 2013	0	0	0	0
(Kazakhstan) Almaty 2017	0	0	0	0
(Russia) Krasnoyarsk 2019	0	0	0	0
(United States) Lake Placid 2023	0	0	0	0
(Italy) Turin 2025	0	0	0	0
Total	0	0	0	0

=== Medals by sport ===
Sport				
Athletics	13	8	22	42
Swimming	11	22	31	64
Judo	3	9	31	43
Taekwondo	3	4	9	16
Artistic gymnastics	3	3	1	7
Volleyball	3	2	5	10
Football	3	1	5	8
Basketball	2	1	3	6
Diving	0	2	6	8
Sailing	0	1	1	2
Rowing	0	1	0	1
Beach volleyball	0	0	1	1
Water polo	0	0	1	1
Total	42	55	116	212

== See also ==
- Brazil at the Olympics
- Brazil at the Paralympics
- Brazil at the Pan American Games
