= Malaysia at the FISU World University Games =

Malaysia at the Universiade
- IOC code: MAS
- National federation: Malaysian University Sports Council
- Website: www.masum.org.my
- Medals Ranked 80th: Gold 1 Silver 8 Bronze 20 Total 29

Summer appearances
- 1985; 1987; 1989; 1991; 1993; 1995; 1997; 1999; 2001; 2003; 2005; 2007; 2009; 2011; 2013; 2015; 2017; 2019; 2021; 2025; 2027

Winter appearances
- 2011; 2013–2015; 2017; 2019; 2023; 2025

Malaysia has participated from the 1985 Summer Universiade and made their debut at the Winter Universiade in 2011 Winter Universiade.

== Medals ==
=== Medals by Summer Games ===
Games	Athletes					Rank
(Italy) Turin 1959	did not participate					
(Bulgaria) Sofia 1961	did not participate					
(Brazil) Porto Alegre 1963	did not participate					
(Hungary) Budapest 1965	did not participate					
(Japan) Tokyo 1967	did not participate					
(Italy) Turin 1970	did not participate					
(Soviet Union) Moscow 1973	did not participate					
(Italy) Rome 1975	did not participate					
(Bulgaria) Sofia 1977	did not participate					
Mexico City 1979	did not participate					
(Bulgaria) Bucarest 1981	did not participate					
(Canada) Edmonton 1983	did not participate					
(Japan) Kobe 1985	4	0	0	0	0	-
(Socialist Federal Republic of Yugoslavia) Zagreb 1987	8	0	0	0	0	-
(West Germany) Duisburg 1989	did not participate					
(United Kingdom) Sheffield 1991	2	0	1	0	1	26
(United States) Buffalo 1993	did not participate					
(Japan) Fukuoka 1995	12	0	0	0	0	-
(Italy) Sicily 1997	3	0	0	0	0	-
(Spain) Palma de Mallorca 1999	6	0	0	0	0	-
(China) Beijing 2001	4	0	0	0	0	-
(South Korea) Daegu 2003	29	0	0	1	1	45
(Turkey) Ízmir 2005	18	0	0	1	1	57
(Thailand) Bangkok 2007	69	0	1	0	1	54
(Serbia) Belgrade 2009	withdraw					
(China) Shenzhen 2011	122	0	1	2	3	47
(Russia) Kazan 2013	102	0	0	3	3	61
(South Korea) Gwangju 2015	107	0	0	2	2	58
(Chinese Taipei) Taipei 2017	63	0	3	4	7	46
(Italy) Naples 2019	35	0	0	1	1	57
(China) Chengdu 2021	66	1	1	5	7	27
(Germany) Rhine-Ruhr 2025	64	0	1	1	2	47
Total		1	8	20	29	80

=== Medals by Winter Games ===
Games	Athletes					Rank
(France) Chamonix 1960	did not participate					
(Switzerland) Villars 1962	did not participate					
(Czech Republic) Špindlerův Mlýn 1964	did not participate					
(Italy) Sestriere 1966	did not participate					
(Austria) Innsbruck 1968	did not participate					
(Finland) Rovaniemi 1970	did not participate					
(United States) Lake Placid 1972	did not participate					
(Italy) Livigno 1975	did not participate					
(Czech Republic) Špindlerův Mlýn 1978	did not participate					
(Spain) Jaca 1981	did not participate					
(Bulgaria) Sofia 1983	did not participate					
(Italy) Belluno 1985	did not participate					
(Czech Republic) Štrbské Pleso 1987	did not participate					
(Bulgaria) Sofia 1989	did not participate					
(Japan) Sapporo 1991	did not participate					
(Poland) Zakopane 1993	did not participate					
(Spain) Jaca 1995	did not participate					
(South Korea) Muju/Jeonju 1997	did not participate					
(Slovakia) Poprad Tatry 1999	did not participate					
(Poland) Zakopane 2001	did not participate					
(Italy) Tarvisio 2003	did not participate					
(Austria) Innsbruck/Seefeld 2005	did not participate					
(Italy) Turin 2007	did not participate					
(China) Harbin 2009	did not participate					
(Turkey) Erzurum 2011	1	0	0	0	0	-
(Italy) Trentino 2013	did not participate					
(Spain) / (Slovakia) Granada/Štrbské Pleso-Osrblie 2015	did not participate					
(Kazakhstan) Almaty 2017	1	0	0	0	0	-
(Russia) Krasnoyarsk 2019	1	0	0	0	0	-
(Switzerland) Lucerne 2021	Cancelled, due to the COVID-19 pandemic					
(United States) Lake Placid 2023	did not participate					
(Italy) Turin 2025	1	0	0	0	0	-
Total		0	0	0	0	-

=== Medals by Summer sport ===
Sport	Gold	Silver	Bronze	Total
Wushu	1	2	4	7
Diving	0	2	2	4
Swimming	0	2	0	2
Badminton	0	1	11	12
Taekwondo	0	1	3	4
Totals (5 entries)	1	8	20	29

== Medals by individual ==
Medal	Name	Games	Sport	Event
Silver	Jeffrey Ong	Sheffield 1991	Swimming	Men's 1500 metre freestyle
Bronze	Elaine Teo	Daegu 2003	Taekwondo	Women's 55 kg
Bronze	Elaine Teo	Ízmir 2005	Taekwondo	Women's 51 kg
Silver	Che Chew Chan	Bangkok 2007	Taekwondo	Women's 72 kg
Silver	Pandelela Rinong	Shenzhen 2011	Diving	Women's 10 metre platform
Bronze	Pandelela Rinong; Leong Mun Yee	Shenzhen 2011	Diving	Women's synchronized 10 metre platform
Bronze	Malaysia women's national diving team	Shenzhen 2011	Diving	Women's team
Bronze	Iskandar Zulkarnain Zainuddin	Kazan 2013	Badminton	Men's singles
Bronze	Loh Wei Sheng; Jagdish Singh	Kazan 2013	Badminton	Men's doubles
Bronze	Chow Mei Kuan; Lee Meng Yean	Kazan 2013	Badminton	Women's doubles
Bronze	Low Juan Shen; Muhammad Arif Abdul Latif	Gwangju 2015	Badminton	Men's doubles
Bronze	Daphne Ng Chiew Yen; Erica Khoo Pei Shan; Jagdish Singh; Low Juan Shen; Lydia Cheah Li Ya; Muhammad Arif Abdul Latif; Muhammad Syawal Ismail; Vountus Indra Mawan; Ti Wei Chyi; Zulfadli Zulkiffli; Sannatasah Saniru; Sylvia Kavita Kumares	Gwangju 2015	Badminton	Mixed team
Silver	Nur Mohd Azriyn Ayub; Goh Yea Ching	Taipei 2017	Badminton	Mixed doubles
Silver	Calvin Lee Wai Leong	Taipei 2017	Wushu	Men's nanquan
Silver	Tan Cheong Min	Taipei 2017	Wushu	Women's nanquan
Bronze	Yang Li Lian	Taipei 2017	Badminton	Women's singles
Bronze	Jagdish Singh; Vincent Phuah Cheng Wei	Taipei 2017	Badminton	Men's doubles
Bronze	Nur Mohd Azriyn Ayub; Lyddia Cheah Yi Yu; Jagdish Singh; Goh Yea Ching; Muhammad Syawal Mohd Ismail; Vincent Phuah Cheng Wei; Satheishtharan Ramachandran; Desiree Siow Hao Sha; Yang Li Lian; Yap Rui Chen; Zulfadli Zulkiffli	Taipei 2017	Badminton	Mixed team
Bronze	Loh Choon How	Taipei 2017	Wushu	Men's taijiquan
Bronze	Ahmad Nor Iman Hakim Rakib; Hamdanwahid Rinaldi; Muhammed Syafiq Zuber; Rozaimi Rozali	Napoli 2019	Taekwondo	Team Kyorugi
Gold	Tammy Tan Hui Ling	Chengdu 2021	Wushu	Women's Qiangshu
Silver	Kimberly Bong Qian Ping; Ong Ker Ying	Chengdu 2021	Diving	Women's Synchronised 3m Springboard
Bronze	Liew Xun; Wong Tien Ci	Chengdu 2021	Badminton	Men's doubles
Bronze	Faris Zaim; Anson Cheong Yan Feng; Liew Xun; Faiz Rozain; Tan Kok Xian; Wong Tien Ci; Gan Jing Err; Ng Qi Xuan; Kisona Selvaduray; Desiree Siow Hao Shan; Teoh Le Xuan; Yap Rui Chen	Chengdu 2021	Badminton	Mixed team
Bronze	Ang Qi Yue	Chengdu 2021	Wushu	Men's Daoshu
Bronze	Calvin Lee Wai Leong	Chengdu 2021	Wushu	Men's Nangun
Bronze	Mandy Cebelle Chen	Chengdu 2021	Wushu	Women's Taijiquan
Silver	Khiew Hoe Yean	Rhine-Ruhr 2025	Swimming	Men's 400 m freestyle
Bronze	Wong Ling Ching	Rhine-Ruhr 2025	Badminton	Women's singles

== See also ==
- Malaysia at the Olympics
- Malaysia at the Youth Olympics
- Malaysia at the Paralympics
- Malaysia at the Asian Games
- Malaysia at the Commonwealth Games
