= Thailand at the FISU World University Games =

- IOC code: THA
- National federation: University Sports Board of Thailand
- Website: usbtthailand.net (in Thai and English)
- Medals Ranked 29th: Gold 30 Silver 33 Bronze 61 Total 124

Summer appearances
- 1985; 1987; 1989; 1991; 1993; 1995; 1997; 1999; 2001; 2003; 2005; 2007; 2009; 2011; 2013; 2015; 2017; 2019; 2023

Winter appearances
- 2007; 2009; 2011; 2013; 2015; 2017; 2019; 2023

Thailand first participated at the FISU World University Games (formally the Universiade until 2020) in 1985, and has sent athletes to compete in every Summer Games since then. Thailand has also participated in the Winter Games since 2007, except 2015 Games in Granada and Štrbské Pleso.

Thailand won its first medal at the 2001 Summer Games in Beijing, when the women's national volleyball team took home a bronze in the Women's Team event. Thailand's first gold medal would also come in taekwondo at the 2005 Summer Games in İzmir, when Phichet Phibunkhanrak won the Men's 72 kg event. Since then, Thai athletes have won gold medals at every subsequent Summer Games with the exception of the 2009 Games in Belgrade.

Thailand also won its first medal in the Winter Games at the 2023 Games in Lake Placid, when the freestyle skier Paul Vieuxtemps took home a bronze in the Men's Slopestyle event.

The University Sports Board of Thailand was created and recognized by the Fédération Internationale du Sport Universitaire (FISU) in 1967.

As of 2023, Thai athletes have won a total of 124 medals in the Summer Games and another 2 in the Winter Games. Thailand's most successful Games to date were the 2007 Summer Games in home, as Bangkok acted as host city, where they won thirty medals, of which thirteen of them were gold.

== Hosted Games ==
Thailand has hosted the Games on one occasion.

Games	Host city	Dates	Nations	Participants	Events
2007 Summer Universiade	Bangkok, Thailand	8–18 August 2007	151	6,093	766

== Medal tables ==
=== Medals by Summer Games ===
Games	Gold	Silver	Bronze	Total	Rank
(Italy) 1959 Turin	did not participate				
(Bulgaria) 1961 Sofia	did not participate				
(Brazil) 1963 Porto Alegre	did not participate				
(Hungary) 1965 Budapest	did not participate				
(Japan) 1967 Tokyo	did not participate				
(Italy) 1970 Turin	did not participate				
(Soviet Union) 1973 Moscow	did not participate				
(Italy) 1975 Rome	did not participate				
(Bulgaria) 1977 Sofia	did not participate				
1979 Mexico City	did not participate				
(Romania) 1981 Bucharest	did not participate				
(Canada) 1983 Edmonton	did not participate				
(Japan) 1985 Kobe	0	0	0	0	−
(Socialist Federal Republic of Yugoslavia) 1987 Zagreb	0	0	0	0	−
(West Germany) 1989 Duisburg	0	0	0	0	−
(United Kingdom) 1991 Sheffield	0	0	0	0	−
(United States) 1993 Buffalo	0	0	0	0	−
(Japan) 1995 Fukuoka	0	0	0	0	−
(Italy) 1997 Sicily	0	0	0	0	−
(Spain) 1999 Palma	0	0	0	0	−
(China) 2001 Beijing	0	0	1	1	45
(South Korea) 2003 Daegu	0	0	3	3	42
(Turkey) 2005 İzmir	1	1	1	3	31
(Thailand) 2007 Bangkok	13	7	10	30	6
(Serbia) 2009 Belgrade	0	1	6	7	48
(China) 2011 Shenzhen	7	2	9	18	9
(Russia) 2013 Kazan	3	6	7	16	19
(South Korea) 2015 Gwangju	2	7	9	18	20
(Chinese Taipei) 2017 Taipei	2	5	6	13	27
(Italy) 2019 Naples	1	0	4	5	33
(China) 2021 Chengdu	2	4	6	12	21
(Germany) 2025 Rhine-Ruhr	2	4	4	10	21
(South Korea) 2027 Chungcheong	future events				
(United States) 2029 North Carolina	future events				
Total	33	36	65	134	27

=== Medals by Winter Games ===
Games	Gold	Silver	Bronze	Total	Rank
(France) 1960 Chamonix	did not participate				
(Switzerland) 1962 Villars	did not participate				
(Czechoslovakia) 1964 Špindlerův Mlýn	did not participate				
(Italy) 1966 Sestriere	did not participate				
(Austria) 1968 Innsbruck	did not participate				
(Finland) 1970 Rovaniemi	did not participate				
(United States) 1972 Lake Placid	did not participate				
(Italy) 1975 Livigno	did not participate				
(Czechoslovakia) 1978 Špindlerův Mlýn	did not participate				
(Spain) 1981 Jaca	did not participate				
(Bulgaria) 1983 Sofia	did not participate				
(Italy) 1985 Belluno	did not participate				
(Czechoslovakia) 1987 Štrbské Pleso	did not participate				
(Bulgaria) 1989 Sofia	did not participate				
(Japan) 1991 Sapporo	did not participate				
(Poland) 1993 Zakopane	did not participate				
(Spain) 1995 Jaca	did not participate				
(South Korea) 1997 Muju	did not participate				
(Slovakia) 1999 Poprad	did not participate				
(Poland) 2001 Zakopane	did not participate				
(Italy) 2003 Tarvisio	did not participate				
(Austria) 2005 Innsbruck	did not participate				
(Italy) 2007 Turin	0	0	0	0	−
(China) 2009 Harbin	0	0	0	0	−
(Turkey) 2011 Erzurum	0	0	0	0	−
(Italy) 2013 Trentino	0	0	0	0	−
(Slovakia) 2015 Štrbské Pleso/ (Spain) 2015 Granada	did not participate				
(Kazakhstan) 2017 Almaty	0	0	0	0	−
(Russia) 2019 Krasnoyarsk	0	0	0	0	−
(United States) 2023 Lake Placid	0	1	1	2	21
(Italy) 2025 Turin	0	0	0	0	−
Total	0	1	1	2	45

=== Medals by Summer Sport ===
Games	Gold	Silver	Bronze	Total
Athletics	2	3	2	7
Badminton	6	3	16	25
Football	0	0	1	1
Golf	1	0	2	3
Shooting	5	10	8	23
Table tennis	0	0	2	2
Taekwondo	10	7	15	32
Tennis	5	7	6	18
Volleyball	0	0	2	2
Weightlifting	1	4	7	12
Wushu	0	0	1	1
Total	30	33	61	124

=== Medals by Winter Sport ===
Games	Gold	Silver	Bronze	Total
Freestyle skiing	0	1	1	2
Total	0	1	1	2

== List of medalists ==
=== Medalists by Summer Games ===
Medal	Name	Games	Sport	Event
Bronze	Anna Paijinda; Ladda Duanchai; Nantakan Petchplay; Nurak Nokputta; Patcharee Sangmuang; Piyamas Koijapo; Pleumjit Thinkaow; Saranya Srisakorn; Suphap Phongthong; Wanlapa Jid-ong; Wanna Buakaew; Wisuta Heebkaew	(China) Beijing 2001	Volleyball	Women's tournament
Bronze	Phichet Phibunkhanrak	(South Korea) Daegu 2003	Taekwondo	Men's 54 kg
Bronze	Yaowapa Boorapolchai	(South Korea) Daegu 2003	Taekwondo	Women's 51 kg
Bronze	Sanchai Ratiwatana; Sonchat Ratiwatana	(South Korea) Daegu 2003	Tennis	Men's doubles
Gold	Patiwat Tongsalap	(Turkey) İzmir 2005	Taekwondo	Men's 72 kg
Silver	Yaowapa Boorapolchai	(Turkey) İzmir 2005	Taekwondo	Women's 51 kg
Bronze	Laksami Yumankong	(Turkey) İzmir 2005	Taekwondo	Women's 59 kg
Gold	Pirom Autas; Sittichai Suwonprateep; Sompote Suwannarangsri; Wachara Sondee	(Thailand) Bangkok 2007	Athletics	Men's 4 × 100 m relay
Gold	Buoban Pamang	(Thailand) Bangkok 2007	Athletics	Women's javelin throw
Gold	Boonsak Ponsana	(Thailand) Bangkok 2007	Badminton	Men's singles
Gold	Phattapol Ngensrisuk; Sudket Prapakamol	(Thailand) Bangkok 2007	Badminton	Men's doubles
Gold	Boonsak Ponsana; Duanganong Aroonkesorn; Kunchala Voravichitchaikul; Molthila Meemeak; Nuttaphon Narkthong; Phattapol Ngensrisuk; Poompat Sapkulchannart; Salakjit Ponsana; Savitree Amitrapai; Songphon Anugritayawon; Soratja Chansrisukot; Sudket Prapakamol	(Thailand) Bangkok 2007	Badminton	Mixed team
Gold	Ekalak Vaisayakul; Kiradech Aphibarnrat; Varun Israbhakdi; Varut Chomchalem	(Thailand) Bangkok 2007	Golf	Men's team
Gold	Janejira Srisongkram	(Thailand) Bangkok 2007	Shooting	Women's double trap
Gold	Paramaporn Ponglaokham; Ratchadaporn Plengsaengthong; Sasithorn Hongprasert	(Thailand) Bangkok 2007	Shooting	Women's team 50 m rifle prone
Gold	Chutchawal Khawlaor	(Thailand) Bangkok 2007	Taekwondo	Men's 54 kg
Gold	Patiwat Thongsalap	(Thailand) Bangkok 2007	Taekwondo	Men's 72 kg
Gold	Maenum Chirdkiatisak	(Thailand) Bangkok 2007	Taekwondo	Women's 47 kg
Gold	Danai Udomchoke	(Thailand) Bangkok 2007	Tennis	Men's singles
Gold	Sanchai Ratiwatana; Sonchat Ratiwatana	(Thailand) Bangkok 2007	Tennis	Men's doubles
Silver	Jutamass Tawoncharoen; Nongnuch Sanrat; Orranut Klomdee; Sangwan Jaksunin	(Thailand) Bangkok 2007	Athletics	Women's 4 × 100 m relay
Silver	Athimeth Khamgasem	(Thailand) Bangkok 2007	Shooting	Men's double trap
Silver	Sutiya Jiewchaloemmit	(Thailand) Bangkok 2007	Shooting	Women's skeet
Silver	Dech Sutthikunkarn	(Thailand) Bangkok 2007	Taekwondo	Men's 58 kg
Silver	Nacha Punthong	(Thailand) Bangkok 2007	Taekwondo	Men's 58 kg
Silver	Yaowapa Boorapolchai	(Thailand) Bangkok 2007	Taekwondo	Women's 51 kg
Silver	Chonnapas Premwaew	(Thailand) Bangkok 2007	Taekwondo	Women's 59 kg
Bronze	Poompat Sapkulchannart	(Thailand) Bangkok 2007	Badminton	Men's singles
Bronze	Molthila Meemeak	(Thailand) Bangkok 2007	Badminton	Women's singles
Bronze	Nuttaphon Narkthong; Songphon Anugritayawon	(Thailand) Bangkok 2007	Badminton	Men's doubles
Bronze	Duanganong Aroonkesorn; Kunchala Voravichitchaikul	(Thailand) Bangkok 2007	Badminton	Women's doubles
Bronze	Salakjit Ponsana; Sudket Prapakamol	(Thailand) Bangkok 2007	Badminton	Mixed doubles
Bronze	Adisak Ganu; Anon Sangsanoi; Apipoo Suntornpanavech; Apiwat Ngaolamhin; Chatchai Budprom; Ekaphan Inthasen; Jakkaphan Kaewprom; Kittipol Paphunga; Nantawat Tansopa; Noppol Pitafai; Panupong Wongsa; Sompong Soleb; Suchon Sa-nguandee; Sumanya Purisai; Tevarit Junsom; Thritthi Nonsrichai; Umarin Yaodam; Weerayut Jitkuntod; Wisarut Pannasri; Wuttichai Tathong	(Thailand) Bangkok 2007	Football	Men's tournament
Bronze	Pongpol Kulchairattana; Prakarn Karndee; Prit Sriyapun	(Thailand) Bangkok 2007	Shooting	Men's team 25 m standard pistol
Bronze	Kusuma Tavisri; Sasithorn Hongprasert; Thanyalak Chotphibunsin	(Thailand) Bangkok 2007	Shooting	Women's team 50 m rifle three positions
Bronze	Nanthana Komwong	(Thailand) Bangkok 2007	Table tennis	Women's singles
Silver	Premwaew Chonnapas	(Serbia) Belgrade 2009	Taekwondo	Women's 63 kg
Bronze	Chutchawal Khawlaor	(Serbia) Belgrade 2009	Taekwondo	Men's 54 kg
Bronze	Thanawut Klinkhachon	(Serbia) Belgrade 2009	Taekwondo	Men's 67 kg
Bronze	Patiwat Thongsalap	(Serbia) Belgrade 2009	Taekwondo	Men's 72 kg
Bronze	Chanatip Sonkham	(Serbia) Belgrade 2009	Taekwondo	Women's 51 kg
Bronze	Sarita Pongsri	(Serbia) Belgrade 2009	Taekwondo	Women's 55 kg
Bronze	Rapatkorn Prasopsuk	(Serbia) Belgrade 2009	Taekwondo	Women's +72 kg
Gold	Suppanyu Avihingsanon	(China) Shenzhen 2011	Badminton	Men's singles
Gold	Bodin Isara; Maneepong Jongjit	(China) Shenzhen 2011	Badminton	Men's doubles
Gold	Tanyaporn Prucksakorn	(China) Shenzhen 2011	Shooting	Women's 25 m pistol
Gold	Jerranat Nakaviroj	(China) Shenzhen 2011	Taekwondo	Men's 54 kg
Gold	Nudnida Luangnam	(China) Shenzhen 2011	Tennis	Women's singles
Gold	Nudnida Luangnam; Nungnadda Wannasuk; Varatchaya Wongteanchai	(China) Shenzhen 2011	Tennis	Women's team
Gold	Khanittha Petanang	(China) Shenzhen 2011	Weightlifting	Women's 75 kg
Silver	Tanyaporn Prucksakorn	(China) Shenzhen 2011	Shooting	Women's 10 m air pistol
Silver	Nungnadda Wannasuk	(China) Shenzhen 2011	Tennis	Women's singles
Bronze	Nessara Somsri; Savitree Amitrapai	(China) Shenzhen 2011	Badminton	Women's doubles
Bronze	Maneepong Jongjit; Savitree Amitrapai	(China) Shenzhen 2011	Badminton	Mixed doubles
Bronze	Bodin Isara; Chanida Julrattanamanee; Maneepong Jongjit; Nessara Somsri; Nichaon Jindapon; Parinyawat Thongnuam; Savitree Amitrapai; Suppanyu Avihingsanon	(China) Shenzhen 2011	Badminton	Mixed team
Bronze	Pawin Tantinawachai; Pongpol Kulchairattana; Prit Sriyapun	(China) Shenzhen 2011	Shooting	Men's team 25 m standard pistol
Bronze	Ratchadaporn Plengsaengthong; Sununta Majchacheep; Vitchuda Pichitkanjanakul	(China) Shenzhen 2011	Shooting	Women's team 50 m rifle prone
Bronze	Varatchaya Wongteanchai; Weerapat Doakmaiklee	(China) Shenzhen 2011	Tennis	Mixed doubles
Bronze	Withawat Kritphet	(China) Shenzhen 2011	Weightlifting	Men's 62 kg
Bronze	Pensiri Laosirikul	(China) Shenzhen 2011	Weightlifting	Women's 48 kg
Bronze	Pramsiri Bunphithak	(China) Shenzhen 2011	Weightlifting	Women's 53 kg
Gold	Tanongsak Saensomboonsuk	(Russia) Kazan 2013	Badminton	Men's singles
Gold	Isarapa Imprasertsuk	(Russia) Kazan 2013	Shooting	Women's skeet
Silver	Tanyaporn Prucksakorn	(Russia) Kazan 2013	Shooting	Women's 10 m air pistol
Silver	Thanyalak Chotphibunsin	(Russia) Kazan 2013	Shooting	Women's 50 m rifle prone
Silver	Sununta Majchacheep; Thanyalak Chotphibunsin; Vitchuda Pichitkanjanakul	(Russia) Kazan 2013	Shooting	Women's team 50 m rifle prone
Silver	Isarapa Imprasertsuk; Nutcha Sut-Arporn; Nutchaya Sut-Arporn	(Russia) Kazan 2013	Shooting	Women's team skeet
Silver	Noppawan Lertcheewakarn; Varatchaya Wongteanchai	(Russia) Kazan 2013	Tennis	Women's doubles
Silver	Kittima Sutanan	(Russia) Kazan 2013	Weightlifting	Women's 53 kg
Silver	Chitchanok Pulsabsakul	(Russia) Kazan 2013	Weightlifting	Women's +75 kg
Bronze	Porntip Buranaprasertsuk	(Russia) Kazan 2013	Badminton	Women's singles
Bronze	Akarawin Apisuk; Inkarat Apisuk; Chanida Julrattanamanee; Pacharakamol Arkornsakul; Pijtjan Wangpaiboonkij; Pisit Poodchalat; Porntip Buranaprasertsuk; Rawinda Prajongjai; Savitree Amitrapai; Sermsin Wongyaprom; Suwat Phaisansomsuk; Tanongsak Saensomboonsuk	(Russia) Kazan 2013	Badminton	Mixed team
Bronze	Tanyaporn Prucksakorn	(Russia) Kazan 2013	Shooting	Women's 25 m pistol
Bronze	Kanokkan Chaimongkol; Pattarasuda Sowsa-Nga; Tanyaporn Prucksakorn	(Russia) Kazan 2013	Shooting	Women's team 10 m air pistol
Bronze	Amporn Hyapha; Em-orn Phanusit; Jarasporn Bundasak; Kaewkalaya Kamulthala; Malika Kanthong; Nootsara Tomkom; Onuma Sittirak; Piyanut Pannoy; Pornpun Guedpard; Sontaya Keawbundit; Tapaphaipun Chaisri; Thatdao Nuekjang	(Russia) Kazan 2013	Volleyball	Women's tournament
Bronze	Panida Khamsri	(Russia) Kazan 2013	Weightlifting	Women's 48 kg
Gold	Ratchadaporn Plengsaengthong; Sununta Majchacheep; Thanyalak Chotphibunsin	(South Korea) Gwangju 2015	Shooting	Women's team 50 m rifle prone
Gold	Chanatip Sonkham	(South Korea) Gwangju 2015	Taekwondo	Women's 49 kg
Silver	Porntip Buranaprasertsuk	(South Korea) Gwangju 2015	Badminton	Women's singles
Silver	Princhuda Methaweewong	(South Korea) Gwangju 2015	Shooting	Women's 10 m air pistol
Silver	Pim-on Klaisuban; Princhuda Methaweewong; Tanyaporn Prucksakorn	(South Korea) Gwangju 2015	Shooting	Women's team 10 m air pistol
Silver	Naphaswan Yangpaiboon; Pim-on Klaisuban; Tanyaporn Prucksakorn	(South Korea) Gwangju 2015	Shooting	Women's team 25 m pistol
Silver	Wilasinee Khamsribusa	(South Korea) Gwangju 2015	Taekwondo	Women's 46 kg
Silver	Luksika Kumkhum	(South Korea) Gwangju 2015	Tennis	Women's singles
Silver	Luksika Kumkhum; Noppawan Lertcheewakarn; Varatchaya Wongteanchai	(South Korea) Gwangju 2015	Tennis	Women's team
Bronze	Khanrutai Pakdee; Phensri Chairoek; Supawan Thipat; Tassaporn Wannakit	(South Korea) Gwangju 2015	Athletics	Women's 4 × 100 m relay
Bronze	Bodin Isara; Nipitphon Puangpuapech	(South Korea) Gwangju 2015	Badminton	Men's doubles
Bronze	Bodin Isara; Busanan Ongbamrungphan; Chayanit Chaladchalam; Jakkit Tuntirasin; Jongkolphan Kititharakul; Nipitphon Puangpuapech; Phataimas Muenwong; Porntip Buranaprasertsuk; Rawinda Prajongjai; Sermsin Wongyaprom; Suppanyu Avihingsanon; Tanongsak Saensomboonsuk	(South Korea) Gwangju 2015	Badminton	Mixed team
Bronze	Natipong Srithong	(South Korea) Gwangju 2015	Golf	Men's individual
Bronze	Sitanart Singhanart	(South Korea) Gwangju 2015	Golf	Women's individual
Bronze	Sununta Majchacheep	(South Korea) Gwangju 2015	Shooting	Women's 50 m rifle prone
Bronze	Rangsiya Nisaisom	(South Korea) Gwangju 2015	Taekwondo	Women's 57 kg
Bronze	Varatchaya Wongteanchai	(South Korea) Gwangju 2015	Tennis	Women's singles
Bronze	Noppawan Lertcheewakarn; Varatchaya Wongteanchai	(South Korea) Gwangju 2015	Tennis	Women's doubles
Gold	Panipak Wongpattanakit	(Chinese Taipei) Taipei 2017	Taekwondo	Women's 49 kg
Gold	Varatchaya Wongteanchai	(Chinese Taipei) Taipei 2017	Tennis	Women's singles
Silver	Chayanit Chaladchalam; Phataimas Muenwong	(Chinese Taipei) Taipei 2017	Badminton	Women's doubles
Silver	Varatchaya Wongteanchai; Varunya Wongteanchai	(Chinese Taipei) Taipei 2017	Tennis	Women's doubles
Silver	Chompoothip Jundakate; Patcharin Cheapchandej; Varatchaya Wongteanchai; Varunya Wongteanchai	(Chinese Taipei) Taipei 2017	Tennis	Women's team
Silver	Sukanya Srisurat	(Chinese Taipei) Taipei 2017	Weightlifting	Women's 58 kg
Silver	Chitchanok Pulsabsakul	(Chinese Taipei) Taipei 2017	Weightlifting	Women's +90 kg
Bronze	Pannawit Thongnuam	(Chinese Taipei) Taipei 2017	Badminton	Men's singles
Bronze	Chayanit Chaladchalam; Inkarat Apisuk; Kittisak Namdash; Natchpapha Chatupornkarnchana; Natcha Saengchote; Nuntakarn Aimsaard; Pannawit Thongnuam; Phataimas Muenwong; Prinyawat Thongnuam; Sanicha Chumnibannakarn; Tinn Isriyanet; Wannawat Ampunsuwan	(Chinese Taipei) Taipei 2017	Badminton	Mixed team
Bronze	Sarat Sumpradit	(Chinese Taipei) Taipei 2017	Weightlifting	Men's 94 kg
Bronze	Supattra Kaewkhong	(Chinese Taipei) Taipei 2017	Weightlifting	Women's 53 kg
Bronze	Tawin Hanprab	(Chinese Taipei) Taipei 2017	Taekwondo	Men's 58 kg
Bronze	Patcharin Cheapchandej	(Chinese Taipei) Taipei 2017	Tennis	Women's singles
Gold	Panipak Wongpattanakit	(Italy) Naples 2019	Taekwondo	Women's 49 kg
Bronze	Sutthisak Singkhon	(Italy) Naples 2019	Athletics	Men's decathlon
Bronze	Sakuna Laosungnoen; Phenkanya Phaisankiattikun; Ornawee Srisahakit	(Italy) Naples 2019	Taekwondo	Women's Team Poomsae
Bronze	Ramnarong Sawekwiharee	(Italy) Naples 2019	Taekwondo	Men's 58 kg
Bronze	Chompoothip Jundakate	(Italy) Naples 2019	Tennis	Women's singles

=== Medalists by Winter Games ===
Medal	Name	Games	Sport	Event
Silver	Paul Vieuxtemps	(United States) 2023 Lake Placid	Freestyle skiing	Men's big air
Bronze	Paul Vieuxtemps	(United States) 2023 Lake Placid	Freestyle skiing	Men's slopestyle

== See also ==
- Olympics
  - Thailand at the Olympics
  - Thailand at the Youth Olympics
- Paralympics
  - Thailand at the Paralympics
- Deaflympics
  - Thailand at the Deaflympics
- Asian Games
  - Thailand at the Asian Games
  - Thailand at the Asian Para Games
- Southeast Asian Games
  - Thailand at the Southeast Asian Games
- World Games
  - Thailand at the World Games
