= South Korea at the FISU World University Games =

South Korea at the Universiade
- IOC code: KOR
- National federation: Korea University Sports Federation (KUSF)
- Website: www.kusf.or.kr
- Medals: Gold 367 Silver 296 Bronze 331 Total 994

Summer appearances
- 1967; 1970; 1973; 1975; 1977; 1979; 1981; 1983; 1985; 1987; 1989; 1991; 1993; 1995; 1997; 1999; 2001; 2003; 2005; 2007; 2009; 2011; 2013; 2015; 2017; 2019; 2021; 2025

Winter appearances
- 1966; 1968; 1970; 1972; 1975; 1978; 1981; 1983; 1985; 1987; 1989; 1991; 1993; 1995; 1997; 1999; 2001; 2003; 2005; 2007; 2009; 2011; 2013; 2015; 2017; 2019; 2023

South Korea has competed in the FISU World University Games in several years.

== History ==
In the 1959 Turin Universiade, South Korea participated as an observer and did not send competitors. In 1966, South Korea joined International University Sports Federation as an official member and participated in Summer World University Games in 1967.

== Medal count ==
=== Summer Universiade ===
South Korea has won 795 medals at the Summer Universiade and is in the sixth place on the all-time Summer Universiade medal table.

Host nation

Edition					Rank
(Italy) Turin 1959	Did not participate				
(Bulgaria) Sofia 1961	Did not participate				
(Brazil) Porto Alegre 1963	Did not participate				
(Hungary) Budapest 1965	Did not participate				
(Japan) Tokyo 1967	1	9	2	12	10
(Italy) Turin 1970	0	0	1	1	21
(Soviet Union) Moscow 1973	0	0	2	2	23
(Italy) Rome 1975	Did not participate				
(Bulgaria) Sofia 1977	0	0	1	1	22
Mexico City 1979	1	1	0	2	15
(Romania) Bucarest 1981	0	1	4	5	20
(Canada) Edmonton 1983	0	0	1	1	23
(Japan) Kobe 1985	3	0	4	7	12
(Socialist Federal Republic of Yugoslavia) Zagreb 1987	0	1	2	3	27
(West Germany) Duisburg 1989	0	0	1	1	27
(United Kingdom) Sheffield 1991	4	2	4	10	9
(United States) Buffalo 1993	2	4	4	10	13
(Japan) Fukuoka 1995	10	7	10	27	5
(Italy) Sicily 1997	5	3	2	10	9
(Spain) Palma de Mallorca 1999	2	4	8	14	12
(China) Beijing 2001	3	10	14	27	10
(South Korea) Daegu 2003	26	12	17	55	3
(Turkey) Ízmir 2005	11	14	9	34	7
(Thailand) Bangkok 2007	15	18	18	51	5
(Serbia) Belgrade 2009	21	11	15	47	3
(China) Shenzhen 2011	28	21	30	79	3
(Russia) Kazan 2013	17	12	12	41	4
(South Korea) Gwangju 2015	47	32	29	108	1
Taipei 2017	30	22	30	82	2
(Italy) Naples 2019	17	17	16	50	5
(China) Chengdu 2021	17	18	23	58	3
(Germany) Rhein-Rühr 2025	21	9	27	57	4
(South Korea) Chungcheong 2027					
Total	281	228	286	795	

=== Winter Universiade ===
South Korea has won 305 medals at the Winter Universiade and are in the third place on the all-time Winter Universiade medal table.

Host nation

Edition					Rank
(France) Chamonix 1960					
(Switzerland) Villars 1962					
(Czech Republic) Špindlerův Mlýn 1964					
(Italy) Sestriere 1966					
(Austria) Innsbruck 1968					
(Finland) Rovaniemi 1970					
(United States) Lake Placid 1972		2	1	3	12
(Italy) Livigno 1975					
(Czech Republic) Špindlerův Mlýn 1978					
(Spain) Jaca 1981					
(Bulgaria) Sofia 1983					
(Italy) Belluno 1985					
(Czech Republic) Štrbské Pleso 1987					
(Bulgaria) Sofia 1989	4	3	2	9	4
(Japan) Sapporo 1991	5	2	2	9	3
(Poland) Zakopane 1993	5	3	3	11	5
(Spain) Jaca 1995	6	4	4	14	1
(South Korea) Muju-Jeonju 1997	5	2	4	11	6
(Slovakia) Poprad Tatry 1999	0	0	0	0	0
(Poland) Zakopane 2001	8	4	2	14	2
(Italy) Tarvisio 2003	5	3	4	12	5
(Austria) Innsbruck/Seefeld 2005	10	7	6	23	2
(Italy) Turin 2007	10	12	9	31	1
(China) Harbin 2009	12	7	9	28	3
(Turkey) Erzurum 2011	7	3	5	15	2
(Italy) Trentino 2013	8	9	7	24	3
(Spain) / (Slovakia) Granada/Štrbské Pleso-Osrblie 2015	5	9	2	16	2
(Kazakhstan) Almaty 2017	11	5	5	21	3
(Russia) Krasnoyarsk 2019	6	4	4	14	2
(United States) Lake Placid 2023	12	8	9	29	2
(Italy) Torino 2025	8	8	6	20	2
Total	127	94	84	305	2/3

Sports				
Curling	1	2	2	5
Figure skating	0	1	1	2
Freestyle skiing	0	1	1	2
Short track speed skating	96	56	51	203
Ski jumping	4	5	1	10
Snowboarding	2	3	3	8
Speed skating	18	18	24	60

== See also ==
- South Korea at the Olympics
- South Korea at the Paralympics
- South Korea at the Asian Games
