= List of FISU World University Games medals by host nation =

Tabulated below are the medals and overall rankings for host nations in each Summer and Winter World University Games, based on individual Games medals tables.

== Summer World University Games ==
Ranked first

Games	Host nation	Gold	Silver	Bronze	Total	Rank
1959	Italy	18	10	10	38	1
1961	Bulgaria	2	5	7	14	10
1963	Brazil	2	0	9	11	8
1965	Hungary	16	8	14	38	1
1967	Japan	21	18	24	63	2
1970	Italy	4	4	7	15	4
1973	USSR	69	37	31	137	1
1975	Italy	5	1	1	7	3
1977	Bulgaria	16	8	11	35	3
1979	Mexico	1	2	1	4	11
1981	Romania	30	17	20	67	2
1983	Canada	9	10	18	37	3
1985	Japan	5	3	7	15	6
1987	Yugoslavia	7	7	8	22	6
1989	West Germany	3	8	8	19	8
1991	United Kingdom	4	5	5	14	8
1993	United States	31	24	19	74	1
1995	Japan	24	16	24	64	2
1997	Italy	7	14	10	31	6
1999	Spain	7	6	13	27	7
2001	China	54	25	24	103	1
2003	Korea Republic	26	12	17	55	3
2005	Turkey	10	11	6	27	8
2007	Thailand	13	7	10	30	6
2009	Serbia	5	5	9	19	10
2011	China	74	40	32	146	1
2013	Russia	151	72	61	284	1
2015	Korea Republic	47	32	29	108	1
2017	Taiwan	30	35	31	96	3
2019	Italy	15	13	16	44	6
2021	China	103	40	35	178	1
2025	Germany	11	12	17	40	6
2027	Korea Republic					
2029	United States					

== Winter World University Games ==
Ranked first

Games	Host nation	Gold	Silver	Bronze	Total	Rank
1960	France	4	2	1	7	1
1962	Switzerland	1	0	0	1	6
1964	Czechoslovakia	1	2	1	4	5
1966	Italy	0	0	1	1	12
1968	Austria	1	2	3	6	6
1970	Finland	0	0	1	1	11
1972	United States	3	3	6	12	2
1975	Italy	3	3	5	11	2
1978	Czechoslovakia	4	4	2	10	2
1981	Spain	0	0	0	0	11
1983	Bulgaria	1	3	3	7	4
1985	Italy	3	5	2	10	3
1987	Czechoslovakia	17	5	4	26	1
1989	Bulgaria	1	3	0	4	9
1991	Japan	14	9	9	32	1
1993	Poland	0	4	1	5	15
1995	Spain	2	0	0	2	9
1997	Korea Republic	5	2	4	11	6
1999	Slovakia	4	7	8	19	4
2001	Poland	8	3	3	14	3
2003	Italy	5	9	6	20	4
2005	Austria	10	8	4	22	1
2007	Italy	9	2	5	16	3
2009	China	18	18	12	48	1
2011	Turkey	0	1	0	1	23
2013	Italy	3	5	5	13	6
2015	Slovakia	1	3	4	8	16
2015	Spain	0	2	0	2	20
2017	Kazakhstan	11	8	17	36	2
2019	Russian Federation	41	39	32	112	1
2023	United States	3	8	6	17	8
2025	Italy	4	5	6	15	8
2027	China					
2029	Turkey					
