= Serbia at the FISU World University Games =

Serbia at the Universiade
- IOC code: SRB
- National federation: University Sports Federation of Serbia
- Website: www.usss.org.rs
- Medals: Gold 0 Silver 0 Bronze 0 Total 0

Summer appearances
- 2007; 2009; 2011; 2013

Winter appearances
- 2007; 2009; 2011; 2013

Serbia made its debut as independent country at the 2007 Winter Universiade while previously competed as part of SFR Yugoslavia (1961–1991) and FR Yugoslavia/Serbia and Montenegro (1993–2005). Serbia hosted 2009 Summer Universiade in Belgrade.

== Medal count ==
Serbia has won 48 medals in four appearances at the Summer Universiade and is ranked 35th in all-time Summer Universiade medal table.

=== Medals by Summer Universiade ===
Host nation

Edition				
(Italy) Turin 1959	competed as part of SFR Yugoslavia			
(Bulgaria) Sofia 1961	competed as part of SFR Yugoslavia			
(Brazil) Porto Alegre 1963	competed as part of SFR Yugoslavia			
(Hungary) Budapest 1965	competed as part of SFR Yugoslavia			
(Japan) Tokyo 1967	competed as part of SFR Yugoslavia			
(Italy) Turin 1970	competed as part of SFR Yugoslavia			
(Soviet Union) Moscow 1973	competed as part of SFR Yugoslavia			
(Italy) Rome 1975	competed as part of SFR Yugoslavia			
(Bulgaria) Sofia 1977	competed as part of SFR Yugoslavia			
Mexico City 1979	competed as part of SFR Yugoslavia			
(Bulgaria) Bucarest 1981	competed as part of SFR Yugoslavia			
(Canada) Edmonton 1983	competed as part of SFR Yugoslavia			
(Japan) Kobe 1985	competed as part of SFR Yugoslavia			
(Socialist Federal Republic of Yugoslavia) Zagreb 1987	competed as part of SFR Yugoslavia			
(West Germany) Duisburg 1989	competed as part of SFR Yugoslavia			
(United Kingdom) Sheffield 1991	competed as part of SFR Yugoslavia			
(United States) Buffalo 1993	competed as Independent Participants			
(Japan) Fukuoka 1995	competed as FR Yugoslavia			
(Italy) Sicily 1997	competed as FR Yugoslavia			
(Spain) Palma de Mallorca 1999	competed as FR Yugoslavia			
(China) Beijing 2001	competed as FR Yugoslavia			
(South Korea) Daegu 2003	competed as Serbia and Montenegro			
(Turkey) Izmir 2005	competed as Serbia and Montenegro			
(Thailand) Bangkok 2007	0	4	1	5
(Serbia) Belgrade 2009	5	5	9	19
(China) Shenzhen 2011	2	2	0	4
(Russia) Kazan 2013	0	1	8	9
(South Korea) Gwangju 2015	1	2	4	7
Taipei 2017	4	0	0	4
Total	12	14	22	48

=== Medals by Winter Universiade ===
Host nation

Edition				
(France) Chamonix 1960	competed as part of SFR Yugoslavia			
(Switzerland) 1962 Villars	competed as part of SFR Yugoslavia			
(Czechoslovakia) 1964 Špindlerův Mlýn	competed as part of SFR Yugoslavia			
(Italy) 1966 Sestriere	competed as part of SFR Yugoslavia			
(Austria) 1968 Innsbruck	competed as part of SFR Yugoslavia			
(Finland) 1970 Rovaniemi	competed as part of SFR Yugoslavia			
(United States) 1972 Lake Placid	competed as part of SFR Yugoslavia			
(Italy) 1975 Livigno	competed as part of SFR Yugoslavia			
(Czechoslovakia) 1978 Špindlerův Mlýn	competed as part of SFR Yugoslavia			
(Spain) 1981 Jaca	competed as part of SFR Yugoslavia			
(Bulgaria) 1983 Sofia	competed as part of SFR Yugoslavia			
(Italy) 1985 Belluno	competed as part of SFR Yugoslavia			
(Czechoslovakia) 1987 Štrbské Pleso	competed as part of SFR Yugoslavia			
(Bulgaria) 1989 Sofia	competed as part of SFR Yugoslavia			
(Japan) 1991 Sapporo	competed as part of SFR Yugoslavia			
(Poland) 1993 Zakopane	competed as part of Serbia and Montenegro			
(Spain) 1995 Jaca	competed as part of Serbia and Montenegro			
(South Korea) 1997 Muju/Jeonju	competed as part of Serbia and Montenegro			
(Slovakia) 1999 Poprad/Tatry	competed as part of Serbia and Montenegro			
(Poland) 2001 Zakopane	competed as part of Serbia and Montenegro			
(Italy) 2003 Tarvisio	competed as part of Serbia and Montenegro			
(Austria) 2005 Innsbruck	competed as part of Serbia and Montenegro			
(Italy) 2007 Turin	0	0	0	0
(China) 2009 Harbin	0	0	0	0
(Turkey) 2011 Erzurum	0	0	0	0
(Italy) 2013 Trentino	3	0	1	4
(Spain) 2015 Granada	0	0	0	0
(Kazakhstan) 2017 Almaty	0	0	0	0
(Russia) 2019 Krasnoyarsk	0	0	0	0
(United States) 2023 Lake Placid				
Total	3	0	1	4

=== Medals by Summer sports ===
Sport	Gold	Silver	Bronze	Total
Taekwondo	2	1	5	8
Athletics	2	1	2	5
Basketball	2	1	1	4
Water polo	2	0	2	4
Tennis	2	0	1	3
Swimming	1	2	2	5
Shooting	0	4	2	6
Volleyball	0	2	0	2
Canoeing	0	1	3	4
Handball	0	1	1	2
Judo	0	1	0	1
Sambo	0	0	1	1
Table tennis	0	0	1	1
Wrestling	0	0	1	1
Totals (14 entries)	11	14	22	47

=== Medals by Winter sports ===
Sport	Gold	Silver	Bronze	Total
Biathlon	1	0	1	2
Alpine skiing	1	0	0	1
Cross-country skiing	1	0	0	1
Totals (3 entries)	3	0	1	4

== See also ==
- Serbia at the Olympics
- Serbia at the Paralympics
- Serbia at the European Youth Olympic Festival
