= Japan at the FISU World University Games =

Japan at the Universiade
- IOC code: JPN
- National federation: Japanese University Sports Board (JUSB)
- Website: www.joc.or.jp/games/univ/
- Medals Ranked 4th: Gold 531 Silver 515 Bronze 614 Total 1,660

Summer appearances
- 1959; 1961; 1963; 1965; 1967; 1970; 1973; 1975; 1977; 1979; 1981; 1983; 1985; 1987; 1989; 1991; 1993; 1995; 1997; 1999; 2001; 2003; 2005; 2007; 2009; 2011; 2013; 2015; 2017; 2019; 2021; 2025

Winter appearances
- 1960; 1962; 1964; 1966; 1968; 1970; 1972; 1975; 1978; 1981; 1983; 1985; 1987; 1989; 1991; 1993; 1995; 1997; 1999; 2001; 2003; 2005; 2007; 2009; 2011; 2013; 2015; 2017; 2019; 2023; 2025

Japan has participated in all editions of the Summer and Winter World University Games held since the first edition in 1959 and 1960. The nation is ranked 5th in the all-time medal table behind Russia, China, United States, and Soviet Union. Japan has won 1,202 medals at the Summer World University Games and are in the fifth place on the all-time Summer World University medal table. In the winter games, they have won 335 medals at the Winter Universiade and are in the third place on the all-time Winter Universiade medal table.

== Medal count ==
=== Summer Universiade ===
Host country

Edition					Rank
(Italy) Turin 1959	2	2	3	7	9
(Bulgaria) Sofia 1961	9	5	4	18	2
(Brazil) Porto Alegre 1963	9	4	6	19	4
(Hungary) Budapest 1965	5	0	2	7	5
(Japan) Tokyo 1967	22	18	24	64	2
(Italy) Turin 1970	3	7	5	15	5
(Soviet Union) Moscow 1973	3	8	1	12	4
(Italy) Rome 1975	0	0	0	0	-
(Bulgaria) Sofia 1977	5	5	1	11	10
Mexico City 1979	1	2	6	9	12
(Romania) Bucharest 1981	3	2	2	7	7
(Canada) Edmonton 1983	2	3	5	10	10
(Japan) Kobe 1985	5	3	7	15	6
(Socialist Federal Republic of Yugoslavia) Zagreb 1987	3	3	6	12	13
(West Germany) Duisburg 1989	0	2	0	2	22
(United Kingdom) Sheffield 1991	5	15	8	28	6
(United States) Buffalo 1993	5	13	12	30	8
(Japan) Fukuoka 1995	24	16	24	64	2
(Italy) Sicily 1997	14	8	11	33	3
(Spain) Palma de Mallorca 1999	11	13	16	40	4
(China) Beijing 2001	14	14	25	53	3
(South Korea) Daegu 2003	13	13	21	47	5
(Turkey) Ízmir 2005	18	18	20	56	3
(Thailand) Bangkok 2007	19	15	22	56	4
(Serbia) Belgrade 2009	20	21	32	73	4
(China) Shenzhen 2011	23	26	38	87	4
(Russia) Kazan 2013	24	29	33	86	3
(South Korea) Gwangju 2015	25	25	35	85	4
Taipei 2017	37	26	37	100	1
(Italy) Naples 2019	33	21	28	82	1
(China) Chengdu 2021	21	29	43	93	2
(Germany) Rhein-Rühr 2025	34	22	27	83	1
(South Korea) Chungcheong 2027	Future event				
Total	412	390	504	1306	4

=== Winter Universiade ===
Host country

Edition					Rank
(France) Chamonix 1960	0	1	0	1	7
(Switzerland) Villars 1962	2	1	3	6	4
(Czech Republic) Špindlerův Mlýn 1964	1	4	1	6	5
(Italy) Sestriere 1966	3	2	2	7	3
(Austria) Innsbruck 1968	3	4	4	11	3
(Finland) Rovaniemi 1970	0	0	2	2	8
(United States) Lake Placid 1972	1	3	0	4	5
(Italy) Livigno 1975	0	0	0	0	-
(Czech Republic) Špindlerův Mlýn 1978	0	0	0	0	-
(Spain) Jaca 1981	0	2	2	4	7
(Bulgaria) Sofia 1983	1	0	0	1	6
(Italy) Belluno 1985	1	0	1	2	10
(Czech Republic) Štrbské Pleso 1987	0	1	0	1	9
(Bulgaria) Sofia 1989	2	1	3	6	8
(Japan) Sapporo 1991	11	9	10	30	1
(Poland) Zakopane 1993	6	5	4	15	1
(Spain) Jaca 1995	2	3	5	10	5
(South Korea) Muju-Jeonju 1997	9	9	7	25	1
(Slovakia) Poprad Tatry 1999	4	5	7	16	4
(Poland) Zakopane 2001	3	2	5	10	6
(Italy) Tarvisio 2003	5	6	3	14	5
(Austria) Innsbruck/Seefeld 2005	5	6	6	17	4
(Italy) Turin 2007	3	5	5	13	9
(China) Harbin 2009	9	8	3	20	4
(Turkey) Erzurum 2011	4	3	3	10	6
(Italy) Trentino 2013	3	1	4	8	11
(Spain) (Slovakia) Granada/Štrbské Pleso 2015	2	5	2	9	10
(Kazakhstan) Almaty 2017	6	12	10	28	4
(Russia) Krasnoyarsk 2019	5	4	4	13	3
(United States) Lake Placid 2023	21	17	10	48	1
(Italy) Torino 2025	7	8	4	19	4
Total	119	125	110	354	3

== See also ==
- Japan at the Olympics
- Japan at the Paralympics
- Japan at the Asian Games
