= United States at the FISU World University Games =

United States at the Universiade
- IOC code: USA
- National federation: United States International University Sports Federation
- Website: www.usiusf.org
- Medals Ranked 1st: Gold 508 Silver 454 Bronze 429 Total 1,391

Summer appearances
- 1965; 1967; 1970; 1973; 1975; 1977; 1979; 1981; 1983; 1985; 1987; 1989; 1991; 1993; 1995; 1997; 1999; 2001; 2003; 2005; 2007; 2009; 2011; 2013; 2015; 2017; 2019

Winter appearances
- 1966; 1968; 1970; 1972; 1975; 1978; 1981; 1983; 1985; 1987; 1989; 1991; 1993; 1995; 1997; 1999; 2001; 2003; 2005; 2007; 2009; 2011; 2013; 2015; 2017; 2019; 2023

The United States has participated in all editions of the Summer and Winter Universiade held since 1965. The United States is ranked 2nd in the all-time medal table behind China.

== Medal count ==
=== Summer Universiade ===
Host nation

Edition				
(Italy) Turin 1959	did not participate			
(Bulgaria) Sofia 1961	did not participate			
(Brazil) Porto Alegre 1963	did not participate			
(Hungary) Budapest 1965	14	10	9	33
(Japan) Tokyo 1967	32	22	7	61
(Italy) Turin 1970	22	18	11	51
(Soviet Union) Moscow 1973	19	16	18	52
(Italy) Rome 1975	2	4	0	6
(Bulgaria) Sofia 1977	19	11	14	44
Mexico City 1979	21	14	16	51
(Romania) Bucarest 1981	29	19	9	57
(Canada) Edmonton 1983	12	20	22	54
(Japan) Kobe 1985	25	21	23	69
(Socialist Federal Republic of Yugoslavia) Zagreb 1987	25	19	25	69
(West Germany) Duisburg 1989	9	9	8	26
(United Kingdom) Sheffield 1991	28	24	23	75
(United States) Buffalo 1993	31	24	19	74
(Japan) Fukuoka 1995	24	27	18	69
(Italy) Sicily 1997	20	19	22	61
(Spain) Palma de Mallorca 1999	28	17	15	60
(China) Beijing 2001	21	13	13	47
(South Korea) Daegu 2003	5	13	18	36
(Turkey) Ízmir 2005	17	12	14	43
(Thailand) Bangkok 2007	10	10	14	34
(Serbia) Belgrade 2009	13	13	13	39
(China) Shenzhen 2011	17	22	12	51
(Russia) Kazan 2013	11	14	15	40
(South Korea) Gwangju 2015	20	15	19	54
2017 Taipei	16	19	16	51
(Italy) 2019 Naples	21	17	15	53
(China) 2021 Chengdu	1	9	14	24
(Germany) 2025 Rhine-Ruhr	28	29	27	84
Total	540	480	465	1485

=== Winter Universiade ===
Host nation

Edition				
(France) Chamonix 1960	did not participate			
(Switzerland) Villars 1962	did not participate			
(Czech Republic) Špindlerův Mlýn 1964	did not participate			
(Italy) Sestriere 1966	0	2	1	3
(Austria) Innsbruck 1968	4	3	3	10
(Finland) Rovaniemi 1970	5	4	1	10
(United States) Lake Placid 1972	1	2	4	7
(Italy) Livigno 1975				
(Czech Republic) Špindlerův Mlýn 1978				
(Spain) Jaca 1981	0	0	1	1
(Bulgaria) Sofia 1983	0	0	2	2
(Italy) Belluno 1985	3	6	2	11
(Czech Republic) Štrbské Pleso 1987	0	1	6	7
(Bulgaria) Sofia 1989	0	5	8	13
(Japan) Sapporo 1991	2	7	3	12
(Poland) Zakopane 1993	5	4	6	15
(Spain) Jaca 1995	4	2	6	12
(South Korea) Muju/Jeonju 1997	0	1	4	5
(Slovakia) Poprad Tatry 1999	0	2	0	2
(Poland) Zakopane 2001	1	0	0	1
(Italy) Tarvisio 2003	0	1	1	2
(Austria) Innsbruck/Seefeld 2005	1	2	0	3
(Italy) Turin 2007	1	1	3	5
(China) Harbin 2009	0	0	0	0
(Turkey) Erzurum 2011	4	2	0	6
(Italy) Trentino 2013	1	1	2	4
(Spain) / (Slovakia) Granada/Štrbské Pleso-Osrblie 2015	2	3	3	8
(Kazakhstan) Almaty 2017	0	1	1	2
(Russia) Krasnoyarsk 2019	0	0	0	0
(Switzerland) Lucerne 2021	Cancelled, due to the COVID-19 pandemic			
(United States) Lake Placid 2023	3	8	6	17
(Italy) Turin 2025	0	1	1	2
Total	37	59	64	160

== See also ==
- United States at the Olympics
- United States at the Paralympics
- United States at the Pan American Games
