= Czechoslovakia at the Universiade =

- IOC code: TCH

Summer appearances
- 1959; 1961; 1963; 1965; 1970; 1973; 1975; 1977; 1979; 1981; 1983; 1985; 1987; 1989; 1991

Winter appearances
- 1966; 1968; 1970; 1972; 1975; 1978; 1981; 1983; 1985; 1987; 1989; 1991

Czechoslovakia participated regularly in the Summer and Winter Universiades since their foundation until the dissolution of Czechoslovakia in 1993. The country also hosted three editions of the Winter Universiades: twice in Špindlerův Mlýn (1964 and 1978) and once in Štrbské Pleso (1987).

== Medal count ==
=== Summer Universiade ===
Czechoslovakia won 64 medals in 15 appearances at the Summer Universiade.

Edition				
(Italy) Turin 1959	2	5	5	12
(Bulgaria) Sofia 1961	3	6	8	17
(Brazil) Porto Alegre 1963	1	1	0	2
(Hungary) Budapest 1965	0	3	2	5
(Japan) Tokyo 1967	did not participate			
(Italy) Turin 1970	0	1	0	1
(Soviet Union) Moscow 1973	2	2	1	5
(Italy) Rome 1975	1	1	0	2
(Bulgaria) Sofia 1977	5	4	1	10
Mexico City 1979	2	0	3	5
(Romania) Bucarest 1981	1	2	1	4
(Canada) Edmonton 1983	0	1	0	1
(Japan) Kobe 1985	1	0	1	2
(Socialist Federal Republic of Yugoslavia) Zagreb 1987	1	2	2	5
(West Germany) Duisburg 1989	0	0	0	0
(United Kingdom) Sheffield 1991	0	0	0	0
Total	16	25	23	64

=== Winter Universiade ===
Czechoslovakia won 121 medals in 15 appearances at the Winter Universiade.

Host nation

Edition				
(France) Chamonix 1960	2	5	0	7
(Switzerland) Villars 1962	1	1	0	2
(Czechoslovakia) Špindlerův Mlýn 1964	1	1	1	3
(Italy) Sestriere 1966	0	1	4	5
(Austria) Innsbruck 1968	3	3	2	8
(Finland) Rovaniemi 1970	3	0	0	3
(United States) Lake Placid 1972	0	0	1	1
(Italy) Livigno 1975	1	2	1	4
(Czechoslovakia) Špindlerův Mlýn 1978	4	2	3	9
(Spain) Jaca 1981	4	4	2	10
(Bulgaria) Sofia 1983	5	4	2	11
(Italy) Belluno 1985	4	3	2	9
(Czechoslovakia) Štrbské Pleso 1987	17	7	5	29
(Bulgaria) Sofia 1989	7	6	2	15
(Japan) Sapporo 1991	2	3	0	5
Total	54	42	25	121

== See also ==
- Czech Republic at the Universiade
- Slovakia at the Universiade
- Czechoslovakia at the Olympics
- Czechoslovakia at the Paralympics
