= Japan at the 1970 Winter Universiade =

- IOC code: JPN
- NOC: Japanese Olympic Committee
- Website: www.joc.or.jp/english/ (in English)

in Rovaniemi, Finland 3 – 9 April 1970
- Medals Ranked 8th: Gold 0 Silver 0 Bronze 2 Total 2

Winter Universiade appearances (overview)
- 1960; 1962; 1964; 1966; 1968; 1972; 1978; 1981; 1983; 1985; 1987; 1989; 1991; 1993; 1995; 1997; 1999; 2001; 2003; 2005; 2007; 2009; 2011; 2013; 2015; 2017; 2019; 2023; 2025

Japan participated at the 1970 Winter Universiade, in Rovaniemi, Finland. Japan finished eighth in the medal table with two bronze medals.

== Medal summary ==
=== Medalists ===
Medal	Name	Sport	Event
Bronze	Shinji Sato; Tomio Okamura; Takayoshi Takahashi; Shunichi Iwaya	Cross-country skiing	Men's relay
Bronze	Keiko Miyagawa	Figure skating	Women's skating

=== Medals by sport ===
Medals by sport
Sport	1st place, gold medalist(s)	2nd place, silver medalist(s)	3rd place, bronze medalist(s)	Total
Cross-country skiing	0	0	1	1
Figure skating	0	0	1	1
Total	0	0	2	2
