= Swimming at the Summer World University Games =

- Events: 43 (men: 20; women: 20; mixed: 3)

Games
- 1959; 1960; 1961; 1962; 1963; 1964; 1965; 1966; 1967; 1968; 1970; 1970; 1973; 1972; 1975; 1975; 1977; 1978; 1979; 1981; 1983; 1985; 1987; 1989; 1991; 1993; 1995; 1997; 1999; 2001; 2003; 2005; 2007; 2009; 2011; 2013; 2015; 2017; 2019; 2021; 2025

Swimming is one of the sports at the biennial Universiade competition. It has been one of the event's competed sports since the inaugural edition. It was not included in 1975 and 1989. This table also includes the results of open water events, which are optional since 2011.

== Editions ==
Games	Year	Host city	Host country	Winner	Second	Third
I	1959	Turin	Italy	Italy	Soviet Union	United Kingdom
II	1961	Sofia	Bulgaria	Japan	Soviet Union	Romania
III	1963	Porto Alegre	Brazil	Hungary	Japan	Soviet Union
IV	1965	Budapest	Hungary	United States	Hungary	Soviet Union
V	1967	Tokyo	Japan	United States	United Kingdom	Japan
VI	1970	Turin	Italy	United States	Soviet Union	Yugoslavia
VII	1973	Moscow	Soviet Union	United States	Soviet Union	Germany
IX	1977	Sofia	Bulgaria	United States	Canada	Soviet Union
X	1979	Mexico City	Mexico	United States	Soviet Union	Czechoslovakia
XI	1981	Bucharest	Romania	United States	Soviet Union	Romania
XII	1983	Edmonton	Canada	Soviet Union	Canada	Australia
XIII	1985	Kobe	Japan	United States	Soviet Union	Netherlands
XIV	1987	Zagreb	Yugoslavia	United States	Romania	United Kingdom
XVI	1991	Sheffield	United Kingdom	United States	China	Canada
XVII	1993	Buffalo	United States	United States	Canada	Cuba
XVIII	1995	Fukuoka	Japan	United States	Japan	Brazil
XVIX	1997	Messina	Italy	Japan	United States	Ukraine
XX	1999	Palma de Mallorca	Spain	United States	Japan	Russia
XXI	2001	Beijing	China	United States	Japan	Ukraine
XXII	2003	Daegu	South Korea	Ukraine	China	Russia
XXIII	2005	İzmir	Turkey	United States	Poland	Japan
XXIV	2007	Bangkok	Thailand	United States	Japan	Germany
XXV	2009	Belgrade	Serbia	United States	Japan	Poland
XXVI	2011	Shenzhen	China	United States	Japan	China
XXVII	2013	Kazan	Russia	Russia	United States	Japan
XXVIII	2015	Gwangju	South Korea	United States	Japan	Russia
XXVIX	2017	Taipei	Taiwan	United States	Japan	Italy
XXX	2019	Naples	Italy	United States	Japan	Russia
XXXI	2021	Chengdu	China	China	Italy	Poland
XXXII	2025	Berlin	Germany	United States	Japan	Italy

== Combinated medal table ==
Last updated after the 2025 Summer World University Games

Rank	Nation	Gold	Silver	Bronze	Total
1	United States	318	245	191	754
2	Japan	108	114	146	368
3	Soviet Union	65	69	49	183
4	China	55	29	21	105
5	Russia	51	43	49	143
6	Italy	48	73	69	190
7	Ukraine	40	27	24	91
8	Canada	25	32	51	108
9	Australia	24	31	38	93
10	Great Britain	22	30	34	86
11	Poland	22	19	26	67
12	Hungary	20	16	15	51
13	Romania	18	14	12	44
14	Germany	13	21	20	54
15	South Africa	12	14	9	35
16	Brazil	11	22	31	64
17	Belarus	10	8	7	25
18	France	9	23	19	51
19	West Germany	8	11	27	46
20	Netherlands	7	17	18	42
21	Lithuania	7	2	5	14
22	Czech Republic	6	12	15	33
23	New Zealand	6	9	5	20
24	Cuba	5	1	1	7
25	Slovakia	5	0	2	7
26	Czechoslovakia	4	6	10	20
27	Yugoslavia	4	4	3	11
28	Hong Kong	4	2	0	6
29	Slovenia	3	3	2	8
30	Individual Neutral Athletes	3	2	1	6
31	South Korea	2	4	9	15
32	Spain	2	4	7	13
33	Belgium	2	3	2	7
34	Portugal	2	3	0	5
34	Switzerland	2	3	0	5
36	Ireland	2	2	2	6
37	Sweden	2	2	1	5
38	Austria	2	1	4	7
39	Bulgaria	2	1	1	4
40	Kazakhstan	1	2	4	7
41	Serbia	1	2	2	5
42	Kenya	1	1	1	3
43	Greece	1	0	1	2
44	Finland	1	0	0	1
44	Kyrgyzstan	1	0	0	1
46	Israel	0	3	2	5
47	Chinese Taipei	0	3	1	4
48	Malaysia	0	2	0	2
49	Bahamas	0	1	2	3
50	Uzbekistan	0	1	1	2
51	East Germany	0	1	0	1
52	Cyprus	0	0	2	2
53	Croatia	0	0	1	1
53	Mexico	0	0	1	1
53	Turkey	0	0	1	1
Totals (55 entries)		957	938	945	2,840

== Pool events medal table ==
Last updated after the 2025 Summer World University Games

Rank	Nation	Gold	Silver	Bronze	Total
1	United States	302	244	184	730
2	Japan	106	110	138	354
3	Soviet Union	65	69	49	183
4	China	54	26	23	103
5	Russia	50	42	49	141
6	Italy	40	65	61	166
7	Ukraine	40	27	24	91
8	Canada	25	32	50	107
9	Australia	24	30	37	91
10	Great Britain	22	30	34	86
11	Poland	22	15	22	59
12	Hungary	19	15	15	49
13	Romania	18	14	12	44
14	Germany	13	18	19	50
15	Brazil	11	22	30	63
16	South Africa	10	12	5	27
17	Belarus	10	8	7	25
18	France	9	21	17	47
19	West Germany	8	11	27	46
20	Netherlands	7	17	18	42
21	Lithuania	7	2	4	13
22	New Zealand	6	9	5	20
23	Czech Republic	5	12	15	32
24	Cuba	5	1	1	7
25	Slovakia	5	0	2	7
26	Czechoslovakia	4	6	10	20
27	Yugoslavia	4	4	3	11
28	Hong Kong	4	1	0	5
29	Slovenia	3	3	2	8
30	Spain	2	4	6	12
31	South Korea	2	3	7	12
32	Belgium	2	3	2	7
33	Portugal	2	3	0	5
33	Switzerland	2	3	0	5
35	Ireland	2	2	2	6
36	Sweden	2	2	1	5
37	Austria	2	1	4	7
38	Bulgaria	2	1	1	4
39	Kazakhstan	1	2	4	7
40	Serbia	1	2	2	5
41	Kenya	1	1	1	3
42	Greece	1	0	1	2
43	Finland	1	0	0	1
44	Israel	0	3	2	5
45	Chinese Taipei	0	2	1	3
46	Bahamas	0	1	2	3
47	East Germany	0	1	0	1
47	Malaysia	0	1	0	1
49	Cyprus	0	0	2	2
50	Mexico	0	0	1	1
50	Turkey	0	0	1	1
Totals (51 entries)		921	901	903	2,725

== Marathon swimming medal table ==
Last updated after the 2017 Summer Universiade

Rank	Nation	Gold	Silver	Bronze	Total
1	Italy	5	4	2	11
2	Russia	1	1	0	2
3	United States	1	0	1	2
4	Hungary	1	0	0	1
5	Germany	0	2	1	3
6	France	0	1	1	2
7	Croatia	0	0	1	1
7	Japan	0	0	1	1
7	Poland	0	0	1	1
Totals (9 entries)		8	8	8	24

== See also ==
- List of Universiade records in swimming
- List of Universiade medalists in swimming (men)
- List of Universiade medalists in swimming (women)
