= Vyacheslav Dryagin =

Medal record

Men's Nordic combined

World Championships
Bronze medal – third place	1970 Vysoké Tatry	Individual

Winter Universiade
Gold medal – first place	1962 Villars	Individual
Gold medal – first place	1964 Špindlerův Mlýn	Individual
Silver medal – second place	1966 Sestriere	Individual

Vyacheslav Yemelyanovich Dryagin (Russian: Вячесла́в Емельянович Дря́гин; September 20, 1940, in Kirov, Kirov Oblast – February 22, 2002) was a Soviet Nordic combined skier who competed in the early 1960s and the early 1970s. He won a bronze medal in the individual event at the 1970 FIS Nordic World Ski Championships in Vysoké Tatry. Dryagin finished seventh in the individual event at the 1964 Winter Olympics in Innsbruck. He also finished eighth in the individual event at the 1968 Winter Olympics in Grenoble.
