= 2007 Universiade =

2007 Universiade may refer to:

- 2007 Summer Universiade, which were held in Bangkok, Thailand
- 2007 Winter Universiade, which were held in Turin, Italy
