= Japan at the 1972 Winter Universiade =

- IOC code: JPN
- NOC: Japanese Olympic Committee
- Website: www.joc.or.jp/english/ (in English)

in Lake Placid, United States 26 February – 5 March 1972
- Medals Ranked 5th: Gold 1 Silver 3 Bronze 0 Total 4

Winter Universiade appearances (overview)
- 1960; 1962; 1964; 1966; 1968; 1972; 1978; 1981; 1983; 1985; 1987; 1989; 1991; 1993; 1995; 1997; 1999; 2001; 2003; 2005; 2007; 2009; 2011; 2013; 2015; 2017; 2019; 2023; 2025

Japan participated at the 1972 Winter Universiade, in Lake Placid, United States. The country finished fifth in the medal table with a gold and three silver medals.

Skier Hideki Nakano was the most successful athlete, winning a gold medal and a silver medal.

== Medal summary ==
=== Medalists ===
Medal	Name	Sport	Event
Gold	Hideki Nakano	Ski jumping	Men's normal hill
Silver	Masayoshi Kashiwagi	Alpine skiing	Men's slalom
Silver	Akiyoshi Matsuoka; Hideo Tanifuji; Kunio Shibata; Motoharu Matsumura	Cross-country skiing	Men's team relay
Silver	Hideki Nakano	Nordic combined	Men's individual

=== Medals by sport ===
Medals by sport
Sport	1st place, gold medalist(s)	2nd place, silver medalist(s)	3rd place, bronze medalist(s)	Total
Ski jumping	1	0	0	1
Alpine skiing	0	1	0	1
Cross-country skiing	0	1	0	1
Nordic combined	0	1	0	1
Total	1	3	0	4
