= Japan at the 1960 Winter Universiade =

- IOC code: JPN
- NOC: Japanese Olympic Committee
- Website: www.joc.or.jp/english/ (in English)

in Chamonix, France 28 February – 6 March 1960
- Medals Ranked 7th: Gold 0 Silver 1 Bronze 0 Total 1

Winter Universiade appearances (overview)
- 1960; 1962; 1964; 1966; 1968; 1972; 1978; 1981; 1983; 1985; 1987; 1989; 1991; 1993; 1995; 1997; 1999; 2001; 2003; 2005; 2007; 2009; 2011; 2013; 2015; 2017; 2019; 2023; 2025

Japan participated at the 1960 Winter Universiade, in Chamonix, France. Japan finished seventh in the medal table with the silver medal won by Nobuo Sato in the men's figure skating event.

== Medal summary ==
=== Medalists ===
Medal	Name	Sport	Event
Silver	Nobuo Sato	Figure skating	Men's singles
