= Japan at the 1962 Winter Universiade =

- IOC code: JPN
- NOC: Japanese Olympic Committee
- Website: www.joc.or.jp/english/ (in English)

in Villars, Switzerland 6 – 12 March 1962
- Medals Ranked 4th: Gold 2 Silver 1 Bronze 3 Total 6

Winter Universiade appearances (overview)
- 1960; 1962; 1964; 1966; 1968; 1972; 1978; 1981; 1983; 1985; 1987; 1989; 1991; 1993; 1995; 1997; 1999; 2001; 2003; 2005; 2007; 2009; 2011; 2013; 2015; 2017; 2019; 2023; 2025

Japan participated at the 1962 Winter Universiade, in Villars-sur-Ollon, Switzerland. Japan finished fourth in the medal table with the two gold medals, a silver medal, and three bronze medals.

== Medal summary ==
=== Medalists ===
| Medal | Name | Sport | Event |
|---|---|---|---|
| Gold | Shigeyuki Wasaka | Ski jumping | Men's small hill |
| Gold | Junko Ueno | Figure skating | Women's skating |
| Silver | Yosuke Eto | Ski jumping | Men's small hill |
| Bronze | Masayoshi Mitani | Alpine skiing | Men's slalom |
| Bronze | Yosuke Eto | Nordic combined | Men's Nordic combined |
| Bronze | Renzo Nigawara | Ski jumping | Men's small hill |

=== Medals by sport ===
Medals by sport
| Sport | 1st place, gold medalist(s) | 2nd place, silver medalist(s) | 3rd place, bronze medalist(s) | Total |
|---|---|---|---|---|
| Ski jumping | 1 | 1 | 1 | 3 |
| Figure skating | 1 | 0 | 0 | 1 |
| Alpine skiing | 0 | 0 | 1 | 1 |
| Nordic combined | 0 | 0 | 1 | 1 |
| Total | 2 | 1 | 3 | 6 |
