= Japan at the 1968 Winter Universiade =

- IOC code: JPN
- NOC: Japanese Olympic Committee
- Website: www.joc.or.jp/english/ (in English)

in Innsbruck, Austria 21 – 28 January 1968
- Medals Ranked 3rd: Gold 3 Silver 4 Bronze 4 Total 11

Winter Universiade appearances (overview)
- 1960; 1962; 1964; 1966; 1968; 1972; 1978; 1981; 1983; 1985; 1987; 1989; 1991; 1993; 1995; 1997; 1999; 2001; 2003; 2005; 2007; 2009; 2011; 2013; 2015; 2017; 2019; 2023; 2025

Japan participated at the 1968 Winter Universiade, in Innsbruck, Austria. Japan finished third in the medal table with three gold, four silver, and four bronze medals.

== Medal summary ==
=== Medalists ===
Medal	Name	Sport	Event
Gold	Hiroshi Itagaki	Nordic combined	Men's Nordic combined
Gold	Hiroshi Itagaki	Ski jumping	Men's normal hill
Gold	Kumiko Okawa	Figure skating	Women's skating
Silver	Sotoo Okushiba; Akiyoshi Matsuoka; Hiroshi Ogawa; Katsutoshi Okubo	Cross-country skiing	Men's relay
Silver	Masatoshi Sudo	Nordic combined	Men's Nordic combined
Silver	Masakatsu Asari	Ski jumping	Men's normal hill
Silver	Keiichi Suzuki	Speed skating	Men's 500 m
Bronze	Yukio Kasaya	Ski jumping	Men's normal hill
Bronze	Kazumi Yamashita	Figure skating	Women's skating
Bronze	Takayuki Hida	Speed skating	Men's 500 m
Bronze	Yoshiaki Demachi	Speed skating	Men's 5000 m

=== Medals by sport ===
Medals by sport
Sport	1st place, gold medalist(s)	2nd place, silver medalist(s)	3rd place, bronze medalist(s)	Total
Ski jumping	1	1	1	3
Nordic combined	1	1	0	2
Figure skating	1	0	1	2
Speed skating	0	1	2	3
Cross-country skiing	0	1	0	1
Total	3	4	4	11
