= Magda Gomes =

Brazilian model and television personality

Magda Gomes (born 11 February 1978 in Barra Bonita, São Paulo) is a Brazilian model and television personality, who is well known in Italy for her television and movie appearances there.

== Biography ==
Gomes studied ballet and jazz dance for five years, and subsequently attended a theater school for two years. In order to maintain her studies, she then began working as a model.

For six years, she travelled between America and Europe, and has the command of four languages, which she improves by reading regularly (Portuguese, English, Spanish and Italian). Reading being her greatest passion, she is also interested in art and particularly renaissance era paintings; visits to museums can sometimes last days.

Her first television appearance was in the popular Italian variety show Markette. The popularity she attained from the show, hosted by Piero Chiambretti, enabled her to appear in several other popular Italian television programs. In 2006, she posed nude for For Men magazine's calendar edition.

She has her own beachwear collection, Magda Gomes Beachwear.
