= Japan at the 1978 Winter Universiade =

- IOC code: JPN
- NOC: Japanese Olympic Committee
- Website: www.joc.or.jp/english/ (in English)

in Špindlerův Mlýn, Czechoslovakia 5 – 12 February 1978
- Medals: Gold 0 Silver 0 Bronze 0 Total 0

Winter Universiade appearances (overview)
- 1960; 1962; 1964; 1966; 1968; 1972; 1978; 1981; 1983; 1985; 1987; 1989; 1991; 1993; 1995; 1997; 1999; 2001; 2003; 2005; 2007; 2009; 2011; 2013; 2015; 2017; 2019; 2023; 2025

Japan participated at the 1978 Winter Universiade, in Špindlerův Mlýn, Czechoslovakia. The country didn't win any medal.
