= Hideki Nakano =

Japanese Nordic combined skier

Personal information
- Nationality: Japanese
- Born: 29 July 1952 (age 74) Hokkaido, Japan

Sport
- Sport: Nordic combined

Hideki Nakano (中野 秀樹, Nakano Hideki; born 29 July 1952) is a Japanese skier. He competed in the Nordic combined event at the 1972 Winter Olympics, and at Lake Placid in 1973.
