= Japan at the 1966 Winter Universiade =

- IOC code: JPN
- NOC: Japanese Olympic Committee
- Website: www.joc.or.jp/english/ (in English)

in Sestriere, Italy 5 – 13 February 1966
- Medals Ranked 3rd: Gold 3 Silver 2 Bronze 2 Total 7

Winter Universiade appearances (overview)
- 1960; 1962; 1964; 1966; 1968; 1972; 1978; 1981; 1983; 1985; 1987; 1989; 1991; 1993; 1995; 1997; 1999; 2001; 2003; 2005; 2007; 2009; 2011; 2013; 2015; 2017; 2019; 2023; 2025

Japan participated at the 1966 Winter Universiade, in Sestriere, Italy. Japan finished third in the medal table with three gold, two silver, and two bronze medals.

== Medal summary ==
=== Medalists ===
Medal	Name	Sport	Event
Gold	Yukio Kasaya	Ski jumping	Men's normal hill
Gold	Nobuo Sato	Figure skating	Men's skating
Gold	Miwa Fukuhara	Figure skating	Women's skating
Silver	Japan	Cross-country skiing	Men's relay
Silver	Kumiko Sato	Figure skating	Women's skating
Bronze	Takashi Fujisawa	Ski jumping	Men's normal hill
Bronze	Takashi Fujisawa	Nordic combined	Men's Nordic combined

=== Medals by sport ===
Medals by sport
Sport	1st place, gold medalist(s)	2nd place, silver medalist(s)	3rd place, bronze medalist(s)	Total
Figure skating	2	1	0	3
Ski jumping	1	0	1	2
Cross-country skiing	0	1	0	1
Nordic combined	0	0	1	1
Total	3	2	2	7
