= Japan at the 1964 Winter Universiade =

- IOC code: JPN
- NOC: Japanese Olympic Committee
- Website: www.joc.or.jp/english/ (in English)

in Špindlerův Mlýn, Czechoslovakia 11 – 17 February 1964
- Medals Ranked 5th: Gold 1 Silver 4 Bronze 1 Total 6

Winter Universiade appearances (overview)
- 1960; 1962; 1964; 1966; 1968; 1972; 1978; 1981; 1983; 1985; 1987; 1989; 1991; 1993; 1995; 1997; 1999; 2001; 2003; 2005; 2007; 2009; 2011; 2013; 2015; 2017; 2019; 2023; 2025

Japan participated at the 1964 Winter Universiade, in Špindlerův Mlýn, Czechoslovakia. Japan finished fifth in the medal table with the a gold medal, four silver medals, and a bronze medal.

== Medal summary ==
=== Medalists ===
Medal	Name	Sport	Event
Gold	Miwa Fukuhara	Figure skating	Women's skating
Silver	Yoshiharu Fukuhara	Alpine skiing	Men's slalom
Silver	Hajima Tomii	Alpine skiing	Men's giant slalom
Silver	Nobuo Sato	Figure skating	Men's skating
Silver	Junko Ueno	Figure skating	Women's skating
Bronze	Takashi Fujisawa	Nordic combined	Men's Nordic combined

=== Medals by sport ===
Medals by sport
Sport	1st place, gold medalist(s)	2nd place, silver medalist(s)	3rd place, bronze medalist(s)	Total
Figure skating	1	2	0	3
Alpine skiing	0	2	0	2
Nordic combined	0	0	1	1
Total	1	4	1	6
