= Japan at the 2019 Winter Universiade =

- IOC code: JPN
- NOC: Japanese Olympic Committee
- Website: www.joc.or.jp/english/ (in English)

in Krasnoyarsk, Russia 2 March – 12 March 2019
- Medals Ranked 5th: Gold 5 Silver 4 Bronze 4 Total 13

Winter Universiade appearances (overview)
- 1960; 1962; 1964; 1966; 1968; 1972; 1978; 1981; 1983; 1985; 1987; 1989; 1991; 1993; 1995; 1997; 1999; 2001; 2003; 2005; 2007; 2009; 2011; 2013; 2015; 2017; 2019; 2023; 2025

Japan participated at the 2019 Winter Universiade, in Krasnoyarsk, Russia. The country finished third in the medal table with five gold, four silver, and four bronze medals.

== Medal summary ==
=== Medalists ===
Medal	Name	Sport	Event	Date
Gold	Kurumi Imai	Snowboarding	Women's halfpipe	March 8
Gold	Naoto Baba	Cross-country skiing	Men's 30 km free mass start	March 9
Gold	Kisara Sumiyoshi	Freestyle skiing	Women's moguls	March 9
Gold	Mai Mihara	Figure skating	Ladies' singles	March 9
Gold	Ikuma Horishima	Freestyle skiing	Men's dual moguls	March 10
Silver	Yuna Koike; Saemi Tanaka; Hikari Tanimoto; Miwako Yamaura; Hinako Matsuyama	Short-track speed skating	Women's 3000 m	March 6
Silver	Kozue Takizawa; Shiori Yokohama; Miki Kodama	Cross-country skiing	Women's 3 x 5 km relay	March 9
Silver	Daichi Hara	Freestyle skiing	Men's moguls	March 9
Silver	Kisara Sumiyoshi	Freestyle skiing	Women's dual moguls	March 10
Bronze	Yoshiki Takahara	Snowboarding	Men's snowboard cross	March 3
Bronze	Kiichi Shigehiro	Short-track speed skating	Men's 1500 m	March 4
Bronze	Ikuma Horishima	Freestyle skiing	Men's moguls	March 9
Bronze	Ayu Tonosaki; Natsumi Sugimoto; Fumika Sasano; Shiori Kosuga; Ayumi Sonoda; Noa Sakurai; Mitsuki Sogabe; Ai Ota; Chika Otaki; Ran Hinata; Maika Mizuno; Mayo Sakamoto; Momoka Miura; Mei Miura; Shioe Omori; Ami Sato; Misato Ushikubo; Chisato Miyazaki; Yoshino Enomoto; Akari Tanioka; Amika Yoshida; Mifuyu Sakashita	Ice hockey	Women's tournament	March 11

=== Medals by sport ===
Medals by sport
Sport	1st place, gold medalist(s)	2nd place, silver medalist(s)	3rd place, bronze medalist(s)	Total
Freestyle skiing	2	2	1	5
Cross-country skiing	1	1	0	2
Snowboarding	1	0	1	2
Figure skating	1	0	0	1
Short-track speed skating	0	1	1	2
Ice hockey	0	0	1	1
Total	5	4	4	13
