= 2007 Winter Universiade =

Multi-sport event in Turin, Italy

XXIII Winter Universiade XXIII Universiade invernale
- Slogan: "Crazy 4 U"
- Host city: Turin, Italy
- Nations: 55 (estimated)
- Events: 10 sports
- Opening: January 17, 2007
- Closing: January 27, 2007
- Opened by: Giovanna Capellano Nebiolo, George Killian
- Athlete's Oath: Giovanni Ramigno
- Judge's Oath: Alberto Moro
- Torch lighter: Livio Berruti
- Main venue: Palasport Olimpico

The 2007 Winter Universiade, the XXIII Winter Universiade, took place in Turin, Italy from January 17 to 27, 2007.

== Opening ceremony ==
The Opening Ceremony of the XXIII Winter Universiade Torino 2007 was held with a cast of acrobats, circus performers and dancers. The evening began with the "Princess of the Snow", Magda Gomes, who introduced the audience to a journey that joins Turin to the rest of the world through the student spirit of the Universiade. Her message was followed by a parade of the 52 participant nations and a speech by Giovanna Capellano Nebiolo (President of the Organizing Committee) and George Killian (FISU President). Together they officially opened the Games: both greeted the Universiade and declared the event officially open. After the flag-raising ceremony Livio Berruti entered the Palasport Olimpico to complete the tour of the Flame of Knowledge, lighting at the same time the braziers of the stadium and the Piazza Vittorio Veneto. All sports to be held at the Games were introduced by a group of dancers and gymnasts. The ceremony ended with live music by Negrita. Other people who showed up in the opening ceremony were Gianluigi Buffon, Andrew Howe and Arturo Brachetti. The last one revealing the slogan for the Universiade, which is "Crazy 4 U". Among the present personalities were Fabio Mussi, Mercedes Bresso, Antonio Saitta, Sergio Chiamparino, Renato Montabone, Sara Simeoni, Alberto Zaccheroni and Gianni Vattimo.

== Sports ==
The Games features 18 medal events in 12 sports.

=== Sports ===
- Alpine skiing (8)
- Biathlon (10)
- Cross-country skiing (10)
- Curling (2)
- Figure skating (5)
- Ice hockey (1)
- Nordic combined (3)
- Short track speed skating (10)
- Ski jumping (4)
- Snowboarding (6)
- Speed skating (12)

== Medal table ==
* Host nation (Italy)

Rank	Nation	Gold	Silver	Bronze	Total
1	South Korea (KOR)	10	12	9	31
2	Russia (RUS)	9	14	12	35
3	Italy (ITA)*	9	2	5	16
4	Belarus (BLR)	8	2	4	14
5	Poland (POL)	7	2	3	12
6	Czech Republic (CZE)	4	4	1	9
7	Austria (AUT)	4	0	0	4
8	China (CHN)	3	6	6	15
9	Japan (JPN)	3	5	5	13
10	Netherlands (NED)	3	1	2	6
11	Ukraine (UKR)	2	8	6	16
12	France (FRA)	2	2	2	6
13	Kazakhstan (KAZ)	2	1	2	5
14	Canada (CAN)	2	1	1	4
15	Slovenia (SLO)	1	5	4	10
16	United States (USA)	1	1	3	5
17	Sweden (SWE)	1	0	2	3
18	Slovakia (SVK)	0	2	0	2
19	Finland (FIN)	0	1	1	2
20	Germany (GER)	0	1	0	1
20	Great Britain (GBR)	0	1	0	1
22	Estonia (EST)	0	0	1	1
22	Liechtenstein (LIE)	0	0	1	1
22	Switzerland (SUI)	0	0	1	1
Totals (24 entries)		71	71	71	213
