= 2003 Winter Universiade =

Multi-sport event in Tarvisio, Italy

XXI Winter Universiade XXI Universiade invernale
- Host city: Tarvisio, Italy
- Events: 8 sports
- Opening: January 16, 2003
- Closing: January 26, 2003

The 2003 Winter Universiade, the XXI Winter Universiade, took place in Tarvisio, Italy. Total 1,266 athletes from 41 countries performed.

== Venues ==
=== Tarvisio ===
- Alpine skiing
- Cross-country skiing
- Nordic combined
- Ski jumping

=== Other venues ===
- Forni Avoltri - Biathlon
- Claut - Curling
- Piancavallo - Figure skating, short track, snowboard
- Pontebba - Ice hockey
- Zoncolan - Carving
- Villach Austria - Ice hockey
- Bischofshofen Austria - Ski jumping

=== Sports ===
- Alpine skiing (12)
- Biathlon (10)
- Cross-country skiing (8)
- Curling (2)
- Figure skating (4)
- Ice hockey (1)
- Nordic combined (3)
- Short track speed skating (10)
- Ski jumping (3)
- Snowboarding (6)

== Medal table ==
* Host nation (Italy)

Rank	Nation	Gold	Silver	Bronze	Total
1	Russia (RUS)	12	10	10	32
2	Ukraine (UKR)	7	4	3	14
3	China (CHN)	6	2	2	10
4	Italy (ITA)*	5	9	6	20
5	Japan (JPN)	5	6	3	14
6	South Korea (KOR)	5	3	4	12
7	Slovenia (SLO)	3	4	3	10
8	Austria (AUT)	3	1	1	5
9	Canada (CAN)	2	5	3	10
10	Czech Republic (CZE)	2	2	2	6
10	Kazakhstan (KAZ)	2	2	2	6
12	Belarus (BLR)	2	2	1	5
13	France (FRA)	2	1	1	4
14	Finland (FIN)	1	3	4	8
15	Switzerland (SUI)	1	2	1	4
16	Germany (GER)	1	0	1	2
17	Sweden (SWE)	1	0	0	1
18	Slovakia (SVK)	0	2	2	4
19	Poland (POL)	0	1	3	4
20	Great Britain (GBR)	0	1	1	2
20	United States (USA)	0	1	1	2
22	Norway (NOR)	0	0	1	1
22	Yugoslavia (FRY)	0	0	1	1
Totals (23 entries)		60	61	56	177
