= 1989 Winter Universiade =

Multi-sport event in Sofia, Bulgaria

XIV Winter Universiade XIV Зимна универсиада
- Host city: Sofia, Bulgaria
- Opening: 2 March 1989
- Closing: 12 March 1989
- Opened by: Todor Zhivkov

The 1989 Winter Universiade, the XIV Winter Universiade, took place in Sofia, Bulgaria.

== Medal table ==
* Host nation (Bulgaria)

| Rank | Nation | Gold | Silver | Bronze | Total |
|---|---|---|---|---|---|
| 1 | Soviet Union (URS) | 10 | 11 | 10 | 31 |
| 2 | Czechoslovakia (TCH) | 7 | 6 | 2 | 15 |
| 3 | China (CHN) | 5 | 2 | 6 | 13 |
| 4 | South Korea (KOR) | 4 | 3 | 2 | 9 |
| 5 | Yugoslavia (YUG) | 3 | 1 | 0 | 4 |
| 6 | East Germany (GDR) | 3 | 0 | 0 | 3 |
| 7 | Italy (ITA) | 2 | 3 | 1 | 6 |
| 8 | Japan (JPN) | 2 | 1 | 3 | 6 |
| 9 | Bulgaria (BUL)* | 1 | 3 | 0 | 4 |
| 10 | Austria (AUT) | 1 | 2 | 1 | 4 |
| 11 | West Germany (FRG) | 1 | 0 | 3 | 4 |
| 12 | France (FRA) | 1 | 0 | 0 | 1 |
| 13 | United States (USA) | 0 | 4 | 8 | 12 |
| 14 | Poland (POL) | 0 | 2 | 0 | 2 |
| 15 | North Korea (PRK) | 0 | 1 | 1 | 2 |
| 15 | Switzerland (SUI) | 0 | 1 | 1 | 2 |
| 17 | Finland (FIN) | 0 | 0 | 1 | 1 |
| 17 | Sweden (SWE) | 0 | 0 | 1 | 1 |
| Totals (18 entries) | | 40 | 40 | 40 | 120 |

=== Sports ===
- Alpine skiing (10)
- Biathlon (6)
- Cross-country skiing (6)
- Figure skating (4)
- Ice hockey (1)
- Nordic combined (1)
- Short track speed skating (10)
- Ski jumping (2)
