= 1983 Winter Universiade =

Multi-sport event in Sofia, Bulgaria

XI Winter Universiade XI Зимна универсиада
- Host city: Sofia, Bulgaria
- Opening: February 17, 1983
- Closing: February 27, 1983
- Opened by: Todor Zhivkov
- Main venue: National Palace of Culture

The 1983 Winter Universiade, the XI Winter Universiade, took place in Sofia, Bulgaria. This was one of only four Universiades since Winter 1981 with no official mascot.

== Medal table ==
* Host nation (Bulgaria)

Rank	Nation	Gold	Silver	Bronze	Total
1	Soviet Union (URS)	13	11	7	31
2	Czechoslovakia (TCH)	4	5	2	11
3	Italy (ITA)	2	1	2	5
4	Bulgaria (BUL)*	1	3	3	7
5	France (FRA)	1	1	1	3
6	Switzerland (SUI)	1	0	1	2
7	Japan (JPN)	1	0	0	1
7	Spain (ESP)	1	0	0	1
9	Yugoslavia (YUG)	0	2	0	2
10	Romania (ROU)	0	1	1	2
11	Poland (POL)	0	0	3	3
12	Finland (FIN)	0	0	2	2
13	China (CHN)	0	0	1	1
13	United States (USA)	0	0	1	1
Totals (14 entries)		24	24	24	72

=== Sports ===
- Alpine skiing (8)
- Biathlon (3)
- Cross-country skiing (6)
- Figure skating (4)
- Ice hockey (1)
- Nordic combined (1)
- Ski jumping (1)
