= 1991 Winter Universiade =

Multi-sport event in Sapporo, Japan

XV Winter Universiade 第15回 冬季ユニバーシアード
- Host city: Sapporo, Japan
- Opening: March 2, 1991
- Closing: March 10, 1991
- Opened by: Crown Prince Naruhito
- Main venue: Makomanai Ice Arena

The 1991 Winter Universiade, the XV Winter Universiade, took place in Sapporo, Japan. It was the first Winter Universiade to be held in Asia.

== Venues ==
Venue	Sports	Capacity	Ref.
Makomanai Park	Ski jumping, Nordic Combined, Cross-country skiing, Biathlon	20,000	
Makomanai Ice Arena	Ice hockey, Figure skating and ceremonies	10,000	
Makomanai Open Stadium	Speed skating	25,000	
Hokkaido	Alpine skiing	12,000	

== Medal table ==
* Host nation (Japan)

Rank	Nation	Gold	Silver	Bronze	Total
1	Japan (JPN)*	14	9	9	32
2	Soviet Union (URS)	6	10	6	22
3	South Korea (KOR)	5	2	2	9
4	North Korea (PRK)	4	1	3	8
5	United States (USA)	2	7	3	12
6	Czechoslovakia (TCH)	2	4	1	7
7	Austria (AUT)	2	2	2	6
8	China (CHN)	2	1	3	6
9	Germany (GER)	2	1	0	3
10	Canada (CAN)	2	0	1	3
11	Italy (ITA)	1	2	3	6
12	Netherlands (NED)	1	1	3	5
13	Switzerland (SUI)	1	1	1	3
14	France (FRA)	1	0	1	2
15	Great Britain (GBR)	0	2	1	3
16	Romania (ROU)	0	1	1	2
16	Yugoslavia (YUG)	0	1	1	2
18	Poland (POL)	0	0	2	2
19	Finland (FIN)	0	0	1	1
19	Spain (ESP)	0	0	1	1
Totals (20 entries)		45	45	45	135

=== Sports ===
- Alpine skiing (10)
- Cross-country skiing (8)
- Figure skating (4)
- Ice hockey (1)
- Nordic combined (1)
- Short track speed skating (10)
- Ski jumping (2)
- Speed skating (10)
