= 1981 Winter Universiade =

Multi-sport event in Jaca, Spain

X Winter Universiade X Universiada de invierno
- Host city: Jaca, Spain
- Nations: 28
- Athletes: 583
- Opening: February 25, 1981
- Closing: March 4, 1981
- Opened by: Juan Carlos I
- Torch lighter: Susana Mendizabal and Jorge Pérez Villanueva
- Main venue: Llano de Samper

The 1981 Winter Universiade, the X Winter Universiade, took place in Jaca, Spain.

== Medal table ==
Rank	Nation	Gold	Silver	Bronze	Total
1	Soviet Union (URS)	8	6	4	18
2	Czechoslovakia (TCH)	3	4	2	9
3	Italy (ITA)	3	3	5	11
4	France (FRA)	2	1	2	5
5	Bulgaria (BUL)	2	0	1	3
6	Canada (CAN)	1	0	0	1
7	Japan (JPN)	0	2	1	3
8	Yugoslavia (YUG)	0	2	0	2
9	Finland (FIN)	0	1	2	3
10	United States (USA)	0	0	2	2
Totals (10 entries)		19	19	19	57

=== Sports ===
- Alpine skiing (8)
- Cross-country skiing (6)
- Figure skating (3)
- Ice hockey (1)
- Ski jumping (1)
