= 1975 Summer Universiade =

Multi-sport event in Rome, Italy

VIII Summer Universiade VIII Universiade estiva
- Host city: Rome, Italy
- Nations: 38
- Athletes: 468
- Events: 35 in 1 sport
- Opening: September 18, 1975
- Closing: September 21, 1975
- Opened by: Giovanni Leone
- Main venue: Stadio Olimpico

The 1975 Summer Universiade, also known as the VIII Summer Universiade, took place in Rome, Italy. The 1975 Universiade only featured athletics, other disciplines having been cancelled, as the original host Yugoslavia was unable to hold the event. It was therefore referred to as the World University Championships in athletics.

== First host city process ==
Yugoslavia formally submitted Belgrade's bid in the early 1970s, capitalizing on the country's prominent diplomatic standing. As no other major capital demonstrated viable interest or budgetary feasibility during this period—owing to the onset of global economic strain—Belgrade ultimately ran unopposed. During the FISU General Assembly held in Beaufort, Luxembourg, in May 1972, the executive committee and member nations unanimously approved the Yugoslav bid by acclamation.The federation viewed the yugoslav of Belgrade as an ideal opportunity for two primary geopolitical reasons. First, the city had recently constructed modern sports complexes, a development further consolidated by its selection to host the 1973 World Aquatics Championships. Second, under the government of Josip Broz Tito, the country held a leadership position within the Non-Aligned Movement. Consequently, the country was regarded as a politically neutral and safe territory, capable of bringing together athletes from both the Western and Eastern blocs while mitigating the risks of major political boycotts that threatened the traditional Olympic Games. The original hosting blueprint for Belgrade 1975 was envisioned as a major showcase of Yugoslav modernization and architectural innovation. The infrastructure plan centered on utilizing and expanding newly constructed venues, most notably the 25th May Sports Center on the Danube, designed by prominent architect Ivan Antić, alongside the brutalist residential complexes of the Studentski Grad in New Belgrade. Key venues such as the Red Star Stadium and the newly opened Pionir Hall were also slate for technological upgrades to accommodate international television broadcasts. However, the suspension of the federal budget left these ambitious urban and sports redevelopments frozen, leading directly to the project's abandonment.Due to the premature cancellation of the event, no optional sports were formally approved for the Belgrade program. The architectural and infrastructural blueprint originally drawn for the aborted 1975 Summer Universiade later served as the technical foundation for Belgrade's unsuccessful bids to host the 1992 Summer Olympics and 1996 Summer Olympics. The Olympic bid committees heavily relied on the same urban zoning master plan, proposing the same core venues. However, by the late 1980s, the International Olympic Committee (IOC) deemed these 1970s-era facilities technologically obsolete compared to emotional appel made by Barcelona and the modernism made by Atlanta, which, combined with surging regional political instability, led to the bids' failure.This original 1975 master plan subsequently served as the technical foundation for the city's second and third bids to host the same event. The second bid was launched for the 2001 Summer Universiade, where Belgrade was soundly defeated by Beijing,China in a winning project who served as a structural rehearsal for the victorious bid to host the 2008 Summer Olympics. Belgrade's third attempt, however, was ultimately successful; the city was officially selected as the host for the 2009 event by the FISU Executive Committee in January 2005, defeating competing bids from Monterrey, Mexico, and Poznań, Poland.

== Belgrade withdrawn ==
In February 1974, Yugoslavia adopted a new and complex Constitution. Considered one of the longest in modern history, this fourth and final communist state constitution of the Socialist Federal Republic of Yugoslavia radically decentralized public finances, transferring economic power from the central federal government in Belgrade directly to the six republics and autonomous provinces. Following the promulgation of the new constitution, the organizing committee found itself in a precarious position regarding the infrastructure commitments previously agreed upon with FISU, as the centralized federal funds allocated for these projects were suspended. Without a unified federal fund, the committee lost the state financial guarantees necessary to sustain an event of such magnitude. As the crisis dragged on between March and October 1974, the organizing committee attempted to negotiate bilateral funding transfers with the other republics, such as Croatia and Slovenia; however, they refused to finance infrastructure projects that would be concentrated solely in the capital.This institutional impasse was further exacerbated by external economic shocks. Although the 1973 oil crisis began in late 1973, its most destructive effects on the Yugoslav economy peaked throughout 1974, causing the country's foreign debt to skyrocket within months to cover energy costs. Consequently, inflation spiraled out of control between mid- and late 1974, rendering the previously calculated infrastructure budgets completely obsolete and causing development costs to soar. Faced with imminent economic collapse and the risk of labor strikes driven by the rising cost of living, President Josip Broz Tito and the Federal Executive Council took drastic action in late autumn 1974. The government issued an extreme austerity decree, freezing all public investments not essential to basic industry and power generation. Deprived of federal funds, blocked by vetoes from the other constituent republics, and legally barred by the regime from incurring further debt for sports-related purposes, the Belgrade organizers were unable to overcome the institutional paralysis. On December 20, 1974, the committee had no choice but to formally announce its withdrawal from hosting the event.

After announcement of Belgrade's withdrawal, the International University Sports Federation (FISU) entered a crisis state. Their then president Primo Nebiolo, decided to relocate the Universiade to his native Italy, which he recognized as a reliable host, mirroring the previous emergency measures taken when Lisbon, Portugal, withdrew from hosting the 1969 Universiade. Unlike the traditional selection process, Rome was directly designated as the emergency host city in December 1974 to avert the event's institutional collapse. Due to the extremely constrained preparation window, the eighth edition of the Universiade had to be significantly downsized. Compelled by the short deadline, the organization was scaled back to a single sport, with only athletics competitions taking place. Consequently, the 1975 Rome event was widely referred to as the World University Athletics Championships, held over a brief four-day period at the Stadio Olimpico.

Amidst this organizational crisis, the host selection process for the subsequent edition was officially reopened. Nebiolo utilized the gathering in Rome to negotiate and secure a future host capable of restoring the Games to their full multisport format. Concurrently, during the 1975 event, FISU officially awarded the hosting rights for the 1977 Summer Universiade to Sofia, Bulgaria, marking the beginning of the city's preparations to bring back a full-scale event.

Despite the reduced format, the technical quality of the competition remained elite. A total of 38 nations utilized the Universiade as a crucial preparatory platform and springboard for the upcoming 1976 Summer Olympics.

== Sports ==
- Athletics ()

== Medal table ==
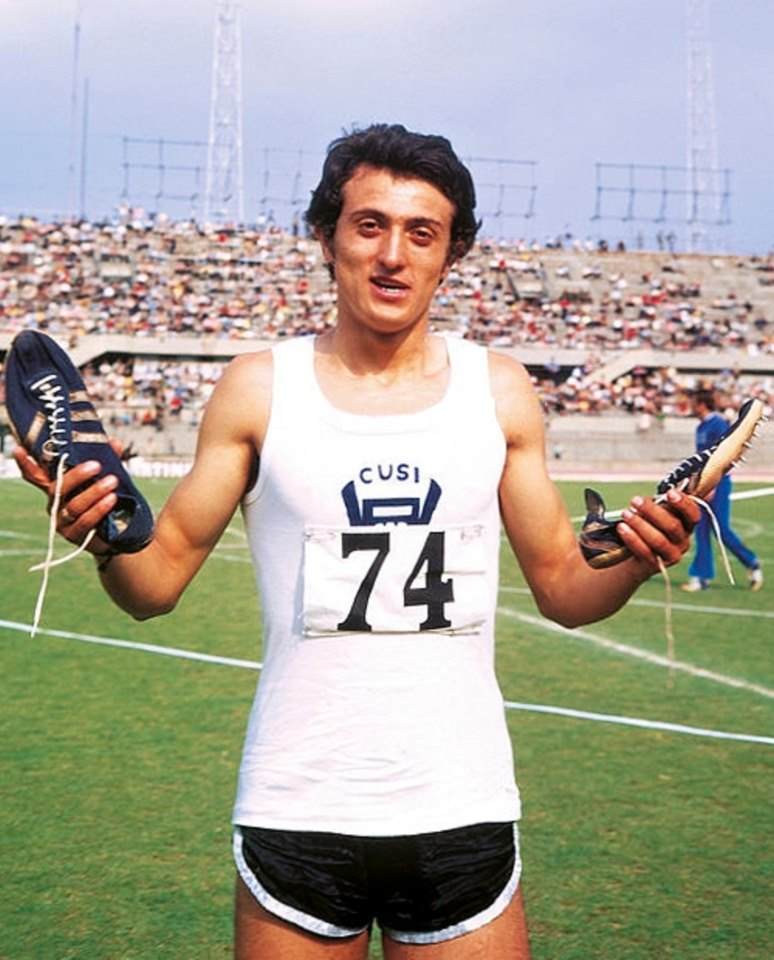
Pietro Mennea won two gold medals at the 1975 Summer Universiade

* Host nation (Italy)

Rank	Nation	Gold	Silver	Bronze	Total
1	Soviet Union (URS)	7	5	11	23
2	Poland (POL)	7	3	1	11
3	Italy (ITA)*	5	1	1	7
4	West Germany (FRG)	3	2	2	7
5	Finland (FIN)	3	2	0	5
6	Romania (ROU)	2	6	4	12
7	United States (USA)	2	4	0	6
8	Bulgaria (BUL)	2	0	4	6
9	Canada (CAN)	1	4	2	7
10	France (FRA)	1	1	1	3
11	Czechoslovakia (TCH)	1	1	0	2
12	Austria (AUT)	1	0	0	1
13	Yugoslavia (YUG)	0	3	4	7
14	Hungary (HUN)	0	2	0	2
15	Great Britain (GBR)	0	1	2	3
16	Algeria (ALG)	0	0	1	1
16	Nigeria (NGR)	0	0	1	1
16	Sweden (SWE)	0	0	1	1
Totals (18 entries)		35	35	35	105
