= 2003 Summer Universiade =

Multi-sport event in Daegu, South Korea

XXII Summer Universiade 제22회 하계 유니버시아드 Je22hoe Hagye Yunibeosiadeu
- Host city: Daegu, South Korea
- Motto: Dream for Unity
- Nations: 174
- Athletes: 4,179
- Events: 187 in 13 sports
- Opening: August 21, 2003
- Closing: August 31, 2003
- Opened by: President Roh Moo-hyun
- Torch lighter: Lee Jin-Taek
- Main venue: Daegu World Cup Stadium
- Website: universiade-daegu.org (archived)

The 2003 Summer Universiade, also known as the XXII Summer Universiade, is an universiade that took place in Daegu, South Korea.

== Emblem ==
- The alphabet letter "U" and five stars, which is FISU's emblem, make up the basis of the emblem for the Daegu Universiade.
- It symbolizes the theme of "Dream for Unity" and the five goals (Dream, Advance, Equalize, Green and Unite) of the Games.
- The wide green stripe emphasizing Daegu's image as an environmentally friendly city.
- The Five-colored stripes symbolize Daegu as a city of textile and fashion.
- The soaring figure of the Universiade's five stars and five stripes in harmony symbolize the challenging spirit of youth across the globe, Daegu's upright spirit and vision for the bright future.

== Mascot ==
- The mascot embodies the Image of Daegu Summer Universiade, a festival of the University Students on the global village.
- The rainbow colors symbolize the textile & fashion industry, environmentally friendly city and the dreams toward unity transcending all the barriers or differences.
- Cyber-typed Mascot represents the creativity and challenging spirit toward the future of the youth.

== Venues ==
=== Daegu ===
Suseong

- Daegu Stadium — ceremonies, athletics, football
- Daegu Athletics Park Swimming Pool — water polo
- Kyeongbuk High School Gymnasium — taekwondo
- Junghwa Girls' High School Gymnasium — basketball
- Suseong District Stadium — football

Buk

- Daegu Municipal Stadium — football
- Daegu Citizens' Gymnasium — basketball
- Daegu Gymnasium — volleyball
- Daegu Il Middle School Gymnasium — volleyball
- Riverside Football Ground — football
- Daegu Expo Hall 1 — fencing

Dalseo

- Daegu Universiade Tennis Center — tennis
- Duryu Swimming Pool — swimming, diving
- Keimyung University Gymnasium — artistic gymnastics
- Keimyung College Sports Stadium - judo
- Yeungnam High School Gymnasium — basketball

Nam

- Yeungnam College of Science & Technology Gymnasium — volleyball

=== Gumi ===
- Gumi Citizens' Stadium — football
- Park Chung Hee Gymnasium — basketball

=== Andong ===
- Andong Gymnasium — basketball

=== Gyeongju ===
- Sorabol College Gymnasium — basketball
- Gyeongju Gymnasium - rhythmic gymnastics

=== Yeongcheon ===
- Yeongcheon Gymnasium — volleyball

=== Gyeongsan ===
- Kyungil University Gymnasium — volleyball
- Catholic University of Daegu Gymnasium — volleyball

=== Gimcheon ===
- Gimcheon Main Stadium — football

=== Yecheon ===
- Yecheon Jin Ho International Archery Field- archery

== Sports ==
Events in a total of twelve sports were contested at this Universiade.

- Note: Numbers in brackets denote the number of different events held in each sport.

=== Obligatory sports ===
- Aquatics
  - Diving (12)
  - Swimming (40)
  - Water polo (1)
- Athletics (45)
- Basketball (2)
- Fencing (12)
- Football (2)
- Gymnastics
  - Artistic gymnastics (14)
  - Rhythmic gymnastics (8)
- Tennis (5)
- Volleyball (2)

=== Optional ===
- Archery (8) ()
- Judo (18) ()
- Taekwondo (16) ()

== Participants ==
- Afghanistan
- Albania
- Algeria
- Angola
- Argentina
- Armenia
- Aruba
- Australia
- Austria
- Azerbaijan
- Bahamas
- Bangladesh
- Barbados
- Belarus
- Belgium
- Benin
- Bermuda
- Bhutan
- Bolivia
- Bosnia and Herzegovina
- Botswana
- Brazil
- British Virgin Islands
- Bulgaria
- Burkina Faso
- Burundi
- Cambodia
- Cameroon
- Canada
- Cape Verde
- Central African Republic
- Chad
- Chile
- China
- Colombia
- Comoros
- DR Congo
- Congo
- Cook Islands
- Costa Rica
- Côte d'Ivoire
- Croatia
- Cuba
- Cyprus
- Czech Republic
- Denmark
- Djibouti
- Dominican Republic
- East Timor
- Ecuador
- Egypt
- El Salvador
- Equatorial Guinea
- Eritrea
- Estonia
- Ethiopia
- Fiji
- Finland
- France
- Gabon
- Gambia
- Georgia
- Germany
- Ghana
- Great Britain
- Greece
- Grenada
- Guam
- Guatemala
- Guinea
- Guinea-Bissau
- Guyana
- Haiti
- Honduras
- Hong Kong, China
- Hungary
- India
- Indonesia
- Iran
- Iraq
- Ireland
- Israel
- Italy
- Jamaica
- Japan
- Jordan
- Kazakhstan
- Kenya
- North Korea
- South Korea (host)
- Kyrgyzstan
- Laos
- Latvia
- Lebanon
- Libya
- Lithuania
- Luxembourg
- Macau, China
- Madagascar
- Malawi
- Malaysia
- Maldives
- Mali
- Malta
- Marshall Islands
- Mauritania
- Mexico
- Federated States of Micronesia
- Moldova
- Mongolia
- Morocco
- Mozambique
- Namibia
- Nepal
- Netherlands
- Netherlands Antilles
- New Zealand
- Nicaragua
- Niger
- Nigeria
- Norway
- Oman
- Pakistan
- Palestine
- Panama
- Paraguay
- Peru
- Philippines
- Poland
- Portugal
- Puerto Rico
- Romania
- Russia
- Rwanda
- Samoa
- São Tomé and Príncipe
- Saudi Arabia
- Senegal
- Serbia and Montenegro
- Seychelles
- Singapore
- Slovakia
- Slovenia
- Solomon Islands
- Somalia
- South Africa
- Spain
- Sri Lanka
- Sudan
- Suriname
- Swaziland
- Sweden
- Switzerland
- Syria
- Chinese Taipei
- Tajikistan
- Tanzania
- Thailand
- Togo
- Tonga
- Tunisia
- Turkey
- Turkmenistan
- Uganda
- Ukraine
- United Arab Emirates
- United States
- Uruguay
- Uzbekistan
- Vietnam
- United States Virgin Islands
- Yemen
- Zambia
- Zimbabwe

== Medal table ==
* Host nation (South Korea)

Rank	Nation	Gold	Silver	Bronze	Total
1	China (CHN)	41	27	13	81
2	Russia (RUS)	26	22	34	82
3	South Korea (KOR)*	26	12	17	55
4	Ukraine (UKR)	23	15	17	55
5	Japan (JPN)	13	13	21	47
6	France (FRA)	8	8	4	20
7	Great Britain (GBR)	8	3	6	17
8	United States (USA)	5	13	18	36
9	North Korea (PRK)	3	8	3	14
10	Poland (POL)	3	4	3	10
11	Chinese Taipei (TPE)	3	3	5	11
12	Belarus (BLR)	3	3	4	10
13	Germany (GER)	3	2	8	13
14	Hungary (HUN)	3	2	7	12
15	Czech Republic (CZE)	3	0	3	6
16	Australia (AUS)	2	5	5	12
16	Italy (ITA)	2	5	5	12
18	Kazakhstan (KAZ)	2	4	0	6
19	South Africa (RSA)	2	1	2	5
20	Uzbekistan (UZB)	2	0	1	3
21	Spain (ESP)	1	4	8	13
22	Brazil (BRA)	1	2	8	11
23	Romania (ROM)	1	2	4	7
24	Netherlands (NED)	1	1	2	4
25	FR Yugoslavia (SCG)	1	1	1	3
25	Morocco (MAR)	1	1	1	3
27	Latvia (LAT)	1	0	0	1
27	Moldova (MDA)	1	0	0	1
29	Mexico (MEX)	0	3	2	5
30	Finland (FIN)	0	3	1	4
31	Slovakia (SVK)	0	2	3	5
32	Iran (IRI)	0	2	2	4
33	Slovenia (SLO)	0	2	0	2
33	Turkey (TUR)	0	2	0	2
35	Canada (CAN)	0	1	2	3
35	Estonia (EST)	0	1	2	3
35	Switzerland (SUI)	0	1	2	3
38	Cuba (CUB)	0	1	1	2
38	Ireland (IRL)	0	1	1	2
40	Denmark (DEN)	0	1	0	1
40	Uganda (UGA)	0	1	0	1
42	Croatia (CRO)	0	0	3	3
42	Thailand (THA)	0	0	3	3
44	Israel (ISR)	0	0	2	2
45	Armenia (ARM)	0	0	1	1
45	Austria (AUT)	0	0	1	1
45	Bahamas (BAH)	0	0	1	1
45	Bosnia and Herzegovina (BIH)	0	0	1	1
45	Cyprus (CYP)	0	0	1	1
45	Greece (GRE)	0	0	1	1
45	Jamaica (JAM)	0	0	1	1
45	Malaysia (MAS)	0	0	1	1
45	Mongolia (MGL)	0	0	1	1
Totals (53 entries)		189	182	233	604
