= 1960 Winter Universiade =

Multi-sport event in Chamonix, France

I Winter Universiade 1ère universiade d'hiver
- Host city: Chamonix, France
- Nations: 16
- Athletes: 145
- Events: 5 sports
- Opening: February 28, 1960
- Closing: March 6, 1960
- Opened by: Charles de Gaulle
- Athlete's Oath: Leo Charlerois
- Judge's Oath: no taken, since 1966
- Torch lighter: Alain Calmat
- Main venue: Stade Olympique de Chamonix

The 1960 Winter Universiade, the I Winter Universiade, took place in Chamonix, France.

== Medal table ==
* Host nation (France)

| Rank | Nation | Gold | Silver | Bronze | Total |
|---|---|---|---|---|---|
| 1 | France (FRA)* | 4 | 2 | 1 | 7 |
| 2 | Soviet Union (URS) | 3 | 1 | 1 | 5 |
| 3 | Czechoslovakia (TCH) | 2 | 5 | 0 | 7 |
| 4 | Austria (AUT) | 2 | 2 | 4 | 8 |
| 5 | Switzerland (SUI) | 2 | 1 | 1 | 4 |
| 6 | Italy (ITA) | 0 | 1 | 1 | 2 |
| 7 | Japan (JPN) | 0 | 1 | 0 | 1 |
| 8 | Poland (POL) | 0 | 0 | 2 | 2 |
| 8 | Yugoslavia (YUG) | 0 | 0 | 2 | 2 |
| 10 | Hungary (HUN) | 0 | 0 | 1 | 1 |
| Totals (10 entries) | | 13 | 13 | 13 | 39 |

=== Sports ===
- Alpine skiing (7)
- Cross-country skiing (2)
- Figure skating (2)
- Nordic combined (1)
- Ski jumping (1)
