= 1985 Summer Universiade =

Multi-sport event in Kobe, Japan

XIII Summer Universiade 第13回 夏季ユニバーシアード
- Host city: Kobe, Japan
- Nations: 106
- Athletes: 2,783
- Events: 119 in 11 sports
- Opening: August 24, 1985
- Closing: September 4, 1985
- Opened by: Crown Prince Akihito
- Torch lighter: Mikako Kotani
- Main venue: Kobe Universiade Memorial Stadium

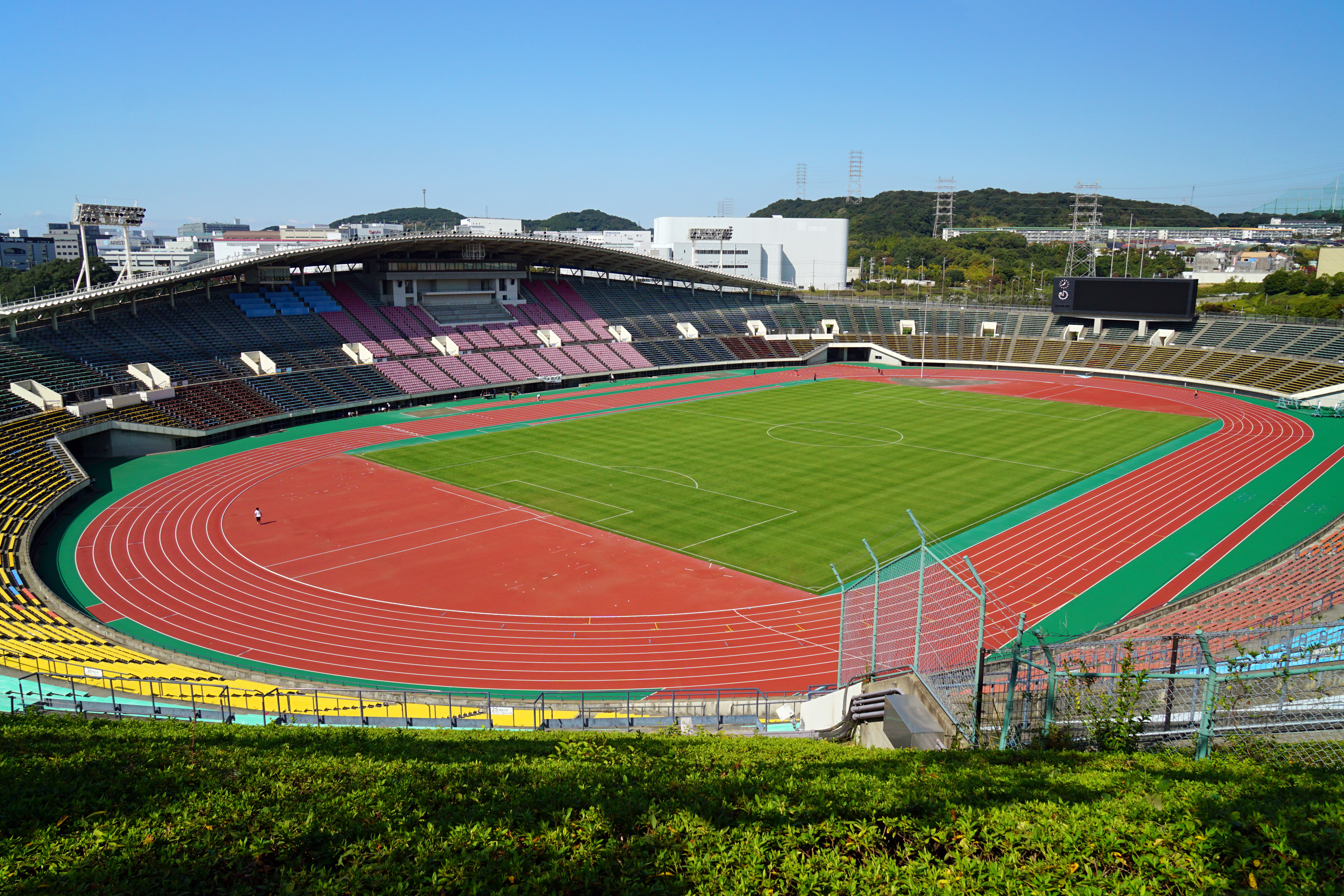
Kobe Universiade Memorial Stadium

The 1985 Summer Universiade, also known as the XIII Summer Universiade, took place in Kobe, Japan.

== Mascot ==
The mascot of the Kobe Universiade, "Unitan", designed by Osamu Tezuka, is a red-crested white crane, symbolic of Japan and a good omen. The name was chosen from some 8,000 suggestions received from throughout the country. The name is derived from a combination of 'uni' from 'Universiade' and 'tan' from the Japanese name for red-crested crane, namely 'tancho-tsuru'.

== Gender test ==
The sex chromatin test was used at these games to decide on participants' gender; Spanish hurdler Maria José Martínez-Patiño was declared a man and thus ruled ineligible for the women's events. In agreement with officials who suggested she fake an injury so she could withdraw without publicity, she complied. She later fought, successfully, to have that diagnosis reversed.

== Sports ==
- Athletics ()
- Basketball ()
- Diving ()
- Fencing ()
- Football ()
- Gymnastics ()
- Judo ()
- Swimming ()
- Tennis ()
- Volleyball ()
- Water polo ()

== Medal table ==
Rank	Nation	Gold	Silver	Bronze	Total
1	Soviet Union (URS)	41	22	17	80
2	United States (USA)	25	21	23	69
3	Cuba (CUB)	8	7	4	19
4	China (CHN)	6	7	6	19
5	Romania (ROM)	5	10	6	21
6	Japan (JPN)*	5	3	7	15
7	Italy (ITA)	4	6	5	15
8	Bulgaria (BUL)	4	5	5	14
9	North Korea (PRK)	3	2	3	8
10	Netherlands (NED)	3	1	4	8
11	Poland (POL)	3	1	2	6
12	South Korea (KOR)	3	0	4	7
13	West Germany (FRG)	2	4	9	15
14	Australia (AUS)	2	4	2	8
15	Nigeria (NGR)	2	1	2	5
16	Hungary (HUN)	1	4	3	8
17	Great Britain (GBR)	1	2	3	6
18	Brazil (BRA)	1	2	2	5
19	Czechoslovakia (TCH)	1	0	1	2
19	Jamaica (JAM)	1	0	1	2
21	Canada (CAN)	0	6	7	13
22	France (FRA)	0	4	3	7
23	Yugoslavia (YUG)	0	1	2	3
24	Mexico (MEX)	0	1	0	1
24	New Zealand (NZL)	0	1	0	1
24	Portugal (POR)	0	1	0	1
24	Uruguay (URU)	0	1	0	1
28	Ivory Coast (CIV)	0	0	1	1
28	Morocco (MAR)	0	0	1	1
28	Puerto Rico (PUR)	0	0	1	1
Totals (30 entries)		121	117	124	362
