= 1975 Winter Universiade =

Multi-sport event in Livigno, Italy

VIII Winter Universiade VIII Universiade invernale
- Host city: Livigno, Italy
- Nations: 15
- Athletes: 191
- Events: 2 sports
- Opening: April 6, 1975
- Closing: April 13, 1975
- Opened by: Giovanni Leone
- Athlete's Oath: no
- Judge's Oath: no
- Torch lighter: no
- Main venue: Stadio Invernali

The 1975 Winter Universiade, the VIII Winter Universiade, took place in Livigno, Italy.

The competition was held as, and also known as, the World University Skiing Championships, as the games included only two events (alpine and cross-country skiing).

== Medal table ==
* Host nation (Italy)

Rank	Nation	Gold	Silver	Bronze	Total
1	Soviet Union (URS)	5	4	4	13
2	Italy (ITA)*	3	3	5	11
3	France (FRA)	2	4	1	7
4	Czechoslovakia (TCH)	2	2	1	5
5	Switzerland (SUI)	2	0	0	2
6	Austria (AUT)	0	1	0	1
7	Poland (POL)	0	0	2	2
8	Liechtenstein (LIE)	0	0	1	1
Totals (8 entries)		14	14	14	42

=== Sports ===
- Alpine skiing (8)
- Cross-country skiing (6)
