= 1978 Winter Universiade =

Multi-sport event in Špindlerův Mlýn, Czechoslovakia

IX Winter Universiade IX Zimní univerziáda
- Host city: Špindlerův Mlýn, Czechoslovakia
- Nations: 21
- Athletes: 347
- Events: 7 sports
- Opening: February 5, 1978
- Closing: February 12, 1978
- Opened by: Gustáv Husák

The 1978 Winter Universiade, the IX Winter Universiade, took place in Špindlerův Mlýn, Czechoslovakia. The Soviet Union topped the medal standings.

== Medal table ==
* Host nation (Czechoslovakia)

Rank	Nation	Gold	Silver	Bronze	Total
1	Soviet Union (URS)	6	3	3	12
2	Czechoslovakia (TCH)*	4	4	2	10
3	Italy (ITA)	2	1	2	5
4	Poland (POL)	1	2	0	3
5	Bulgaria (BUL)	1	1	1	3
5	France (FRA)	1	1	1	3
7	Switzerland (SUI)	0	2	1	3
8	Austria (AUT)	0	1	3	4
9	Finland (FIN)	0	0	2	2
Totals (9 entries)		15	15	15	45

=== Sports ===
- Alpine skiing (8)
- Cross-country skiing (6)
- Ice hockey (1)
- Nordic combined (1)
