= 1972 Winter Universiade =

Multi-sport event in Lake Placid, New York, US

VII Winter Universiade
- Host city: Lake Placid, New York, United States
- Nations: 23
- Athletes: 41
- Events: 7 sports
- Opening: February 26, 1972
- Closing: March 5, 1972
- Opened by: Richard Nixon

The 1972 Winter Universiade, the VII Winter Universiade, took place in Lake Placid, New York, United States.

* Host nation (United States)

Rank	Nation	Gold	Silver	Bronze	Total
1	Soviet Union (URS)	13	10	6	29
2	United States (USA)	3	3	6	12
3	Netherlands (NED)	2	1	1	4
4	Poland (POL)	2	1	0	3
5	Japan (JPN)	1	3	0	4
6	Czechoslovakia (TCH)	1	1	2	4
7	Italy (ITA)	1	1	0	2
8	France (FRA)	1	0	2	3
9	Norway (NOR)	1	0	1	2
9	West Germany (FRG)	1	0	1	2
11	Finland (FIN)	1	0	0	1
12	South Korea (KOR)	0	2	1	3
13	Austria (AUT)	0	1	3	4
14	Canada (CAN)	0	1	0	1
14	Sweden (SWE)	0	1	0	1
16	East Germany (GDR)	0	0	1	1
16	Switzerland (SUI)	0	0	1	1
Totals (17 entries)		27	25	25	77

== Sports ==
- Alpine skiing (6)
- Cross-country skiing (7)
- Ice hockey (1)
- Nordic combined (1)
- Ski jumping (1)
- Speed skating (8)
