= 1968 Winter Universiade =

Multi-sport event in Innsbruck, Austria

V Winter Universiade
- Host city: Innsbruck, Austria
- Nations: 26
- Athletes: 589
- Events: 7 sports
- Opening: January 21, 1968
- Closing: January 28, 1968
- Opened by: Franz Jonas
- Main venue: Bergiselschanze

The 1968 Winter Universiade, the V Winter Universiade, took place in Innsbruck, Austria. The Soviet Union topped the medal standings.

== Medal table ==
* Host nation (Austria)

Rank	Nation	Gold	Silver	Bronze	Total
1	Soviet Union (URS)	7	5	5	17
2	Czechoslovakia (TCH)	4	4	1	9
3	United States (USA)	4	3	3	10
4	Japan (JPN)	2	2	4	8
5	Norway (NOR)	2	1	0	3
6	Austria (AUT)*	1	2	3	6
7	West Germany (FRG)	1	1	1	3
8	Switzerland (SUI)	1	0	0	1
9	Poland (POL)	0	2	0	2
10	Finland (FIN)	0	1	2	3
11	France (FRA)	0	1	0	1
12	Italy (ITA)	0	0	2	2
13	Canada (CAN)	0	0	1	1
Totals (13 entries)		22	22	22	66

=== Sports ===
- Alpine skiing (8)
- Cross-country skiing (4)
- Figure skating (4)
- Ice hockey (1)
- Nordic combined (1)
- Ski jumping (1)
- Speed skating (4)
