= 1991 Summer Universiade =

Multi-sport event in Sheffield, England

XVI Summer Universiade
- Host city: Sheffield, United Kingdom
- Motto: The Future of Sport
- Nations: 101
- Athletes: 3,346
- Events: 123 in 11 sports
- Opening: 14 July 1991
- Closing: 25 July 1991
- Opened by: Anne, Princess Royal
- Torch lighter: Helen Sharman
- Main venue: Don Valley Stadium

The 1991 Summer Universiade, officially known as the XVI Summer Universiade and generally referred to as the World Student Games, were held in Sheffield, England from 14 to 25 July 1991. The Games were the largest sporting event to be hosted in the United Kingdom since the 1948 Summer Olympics.

Sheffield City Council saw the event as a catalyst for urban renewal and regeneration after industrial decline. It set up a company, Universiade GB Ltd, to run the games. New facilities built for the event included the centrepiece Don Valley Stadium and other arenas, while the Lyceum Theatre was renovated for the associated cultural events.

More than 3,300 athletes took part from 101 countries, including the first appearance of a unified German team at a Summer Universiade.

== Preparation and development ==
Sheffield was selected as the host for the 1991 Summer Universiade at an annual meeting of FISU's (Federation Internationale du Sport Universitaire) Executive Committee in the city in February 1987. Despite initial excitement, lack of central government funding and sponsorship led to the organising company, Universiade GB, going into liquidation in the summer of 1990 with debts of more than £1 million. Sheffield City Council stepped in to run the games using taxpayer money.

=== Venues ===
The three major venues for the events were all built especially for the event, on land formerly occupied by various industrial works. Don Valley Stadium, the centrepiece for the Games, was completed in September 1990, at a cost of £29 million. It was the first entirely new outdoor sporting arena built in Great Britain since Wembley in 1923. With a capacity of 25,000, it was twice as large as the second-biggest athletics arena in the country, Crystal Palace.

Ponds Forge, named for the former steelworks demolished to make way for it, hosted the aquatics events.The Sheffield Arena opened in May 1991 as a multi-purpose venue and hosted the gymnastics events.

Other venues included the Concord Sports Center in Shiregreen and Hillsborough Stadium. The football tournament was held across Yorkshire; at Huddersfield, Chesterfield, Wakefield, Bradford, Scunthorpe and Stocksbridge,with some games played at the Hillsborough.

=== Accommodation ===
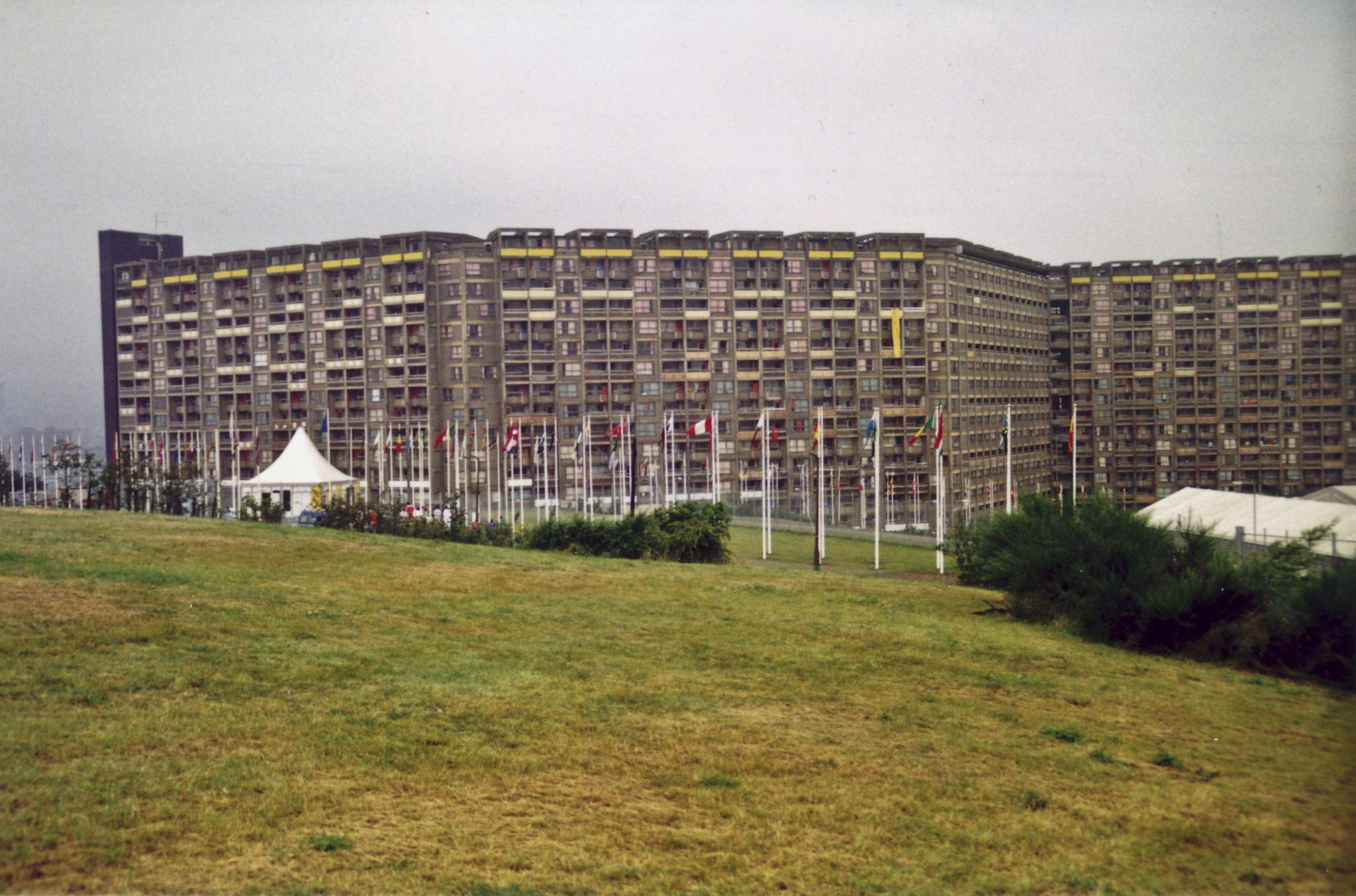
Hyde Park flats during the 1991 Summer Universiade

Hyde Park flats near Sheffield City Centre were used for accommodation for the athletes during the games. Built in the 1960s, many had been demolished, with those left being specially refurbished for the Games.

=== Medals ===
The medals were forged by Thessco, a Sheffield-based mint, who charged no fee for their manufacture. The medals' designs were selected through a national student competition, and the final design bore the Yorkshire Rose.

=== Broadcasting ===
The organisers struggled to find a live broadcast partner with any of the three terrestrial networks so a deal was signed with BSB (British Satellite Broadcasting) and Sky Sports provided extensive live coverage of the event. However, at the time only 1.5 million households had access to satellite television, thus reducing the potential audience. Highlights were shown on Yorkshire Television, with commentary from John Helm and Gary Bloom.

=== Opening ceremony ===
The opening ceremony included a performance honouring Sheffield's industrial heritage, with participants wearing flat caps and waistcoats and carrying hammers, choreographed by Judy Chabola, who had been involved with the opening ceremony of the 1984 Summer Olympics in Los Angeles. Sheffield native Helen Sharman, Britain's first astronaut, attracted publicity when she tripped and dropped the games torch, extinguishing it; the flames were lit by the ignitor in the flame bowl itself.

The Games were then officially opened by Princess Anne.

== Sports ==
- Athletics ()
- Basketball ()
- Diving ()
- Fencing ()
- Field hockey ()
- Football ()
- Gymnastics ()
- Swimming ()
- Tennis ()
- Volleyball ()
- Water polo ()

== Medal table ==
* Host nation (Great Britain)

| Rank | Nation | Gold | Silver | Bronze | Total |
|---|---|---|---|---|---|
| 1 | United States (USA) | 29 | 23 | 27 | 79 |
| 2 | China (CHN) | 21 | 19 | 11 | 51 |
| 3 | Soviet Union (URS) | 16 | 14 | 19 | 49 |
| 4 | North Korea (PRK) | 11 | 3 | 5 | 19 |
| 5 | Italy (ITA) | 6 | 7 | 10 | 23 |
| 6 | Japan (JPN) | 5 | 15 | 8 | 28 |
| 7 | Germany (GER) | 4 | 7 | 6 | 17 |
| 8 | Great Britain (GBR)* | 4 | 5 | 5 | 14 |
| 9 | South Korea (KOR) | 4 | 2 | 4 | 10 |
| 10 | Canada (CAN) | 3 | 5 | 11 | 19 |
| 11 | Poland (POL) | 3 | 3 | 5 | 11 |
| 12 | France (FRA) | 3 | 2 | 4 | 9 |
| 13 | Hungary (HUN) | 3 | 1 | 1 | 5 |
| 14 | Ireland (IRL) | 3 | 1 | 0 | 4 |
| 15 | Australia (AUS) | 2 | 2 | 3 | 7 |
| 16 | Netherlands (NED) | 2 | 2 | 0 | 4 |
| 17 | Romania (ROM) | 1 | 3 | 1 | 5 |
| 18 | Nigeria (NGR) | 1 | 2 | 0 | 3 |
| 19 | Jamaica (JAM) | 1 | 1 | 0 | 2 |
| 20 | Bermuda (BER) | 1 | 0 | 0 | 1 |
| 20 | Chinese Taipei (TPE) | 1 | 0 | 0 | 1 |
| 20 | Finland (FIN) | 1 | 0 | 0 | 1 |
| 23 | Spain (ESP) | 0 | 3 | 4 | 7 |
| 24 | Cuba (CUB) | 0 | 1 | 1 | 2 |
| 24 | Norway (NOR) | 0 | 1 | 1 | 2 |
| 26 | Malaysia (MAS) | 0 | 1 | 0 | 1 |
| 26 | Mexico (MEX) | 0 | 1 | 0 | 1 |
| 26 | Sierra Leone (SLE) | 0 | 1 | 0 | 1 |
| 26 | Yugoslavia (YUG) | 0 | 1 | 0 | 1 |
| 30 | Belgium (BEL) | 0 | 0 | 2 | 2 |
| 31 | Indonesia (INA) | 0 | 0 | 1 | 1 |
| 31 | Kenya (KEN) | 0 | 0 | 1 | 1 |
| Totals (32 entries) | | 125 | 126 | 130 | 381 |

== Legacy ==
Despite the initial high hopes that the Games would foster regeneration in the city, heavy financial losses continue to burden the Games' legacy. Whilst the event cost a reported £10 million to host at the time, with building costs predicted to reach only £25 million, by the opening ceremony construction had already cost £174 million. Loans taken out to build the three main arenas - Don Valley Stadium, Ponds Forge International Sports Centre and Sheffield Arena - have been refinanced four times in the years since, with the final cost coming to £658 million when it is paid off in 2024.

The World Student Games, documented by one of the on site volunteers, Linda Stewart Pitts (Mother of writer and photographer Johny Pitts) appeared as a zine published by Café Royal Books in 2025.

The Don Valley Stadium was used in later years for a variety of events, including rugby league, American football and as Rotherham United's home ground during the construction of New York Stadium. It was demolished due to budget cuts in 2013.

The Sheffield Arena constructed for the games became the home of the Sheffield Steelers Ice hockey team in 1991, in an attempt to find a long term use for the venue. Games continue to be played by the team.

The 1991 Summer Universiade remains the only time that the Games have taken place in the United Kingdom.
