= 1962 Winter Universiade =

Multi-sport event in Villars, Switzerland

Villars 1962 II Winter Universiade: II Winter-Universiade (German); II Universiade d'hiver (French); II Universiade invernale (Italian); II Universiade d'enviern (Romansh)
- Host city: Villars, Switzerland
- Nations: 23
- Athletes: 332
- Events: 6 sports
- Opening: March 6, 1962
- Closing: March 12, 1962
- Opened by: Paul Chaudet
- Athlete's Oath: no
- Judge's Oath: no
- Torch lighter: Ville Alois
- Main venue: Stadium Villars

The 1962 Winter Universiade, the II Winter Universiade, took place in Villars, Switzerland.

== Medal table ==
Rank	Nation	Gold	Silver	Bronze	Total
1	West Germany (FRG)	5	1	1	7
2	France (FRA)	3	2	4	9
3	Soviet Union (URS)	2	3	1	6
4	Japan (JPN)	2	2	2	6
5	Czechoslovakia (TCH)	1	1	1	3
6	Switzerland (SUI)	1	0	0	1
7	Austria (AUT)	0	2	3	5
8	Hungary (HUN)	0	2	0	2
9	Norway (NOR)	0	1	0	1
10	Yugoslavia (YUG)	0	0	2	2
11	Sweden (SWE)	0	0	1	1
Totals (11 entries)		14	14	15	43

=== Sports ===
- Alpine skiing (7)
- Cross-country skiing (1)
- Figure skating (3)
- Ice hockey (1)
- Nordic combined (1)
- Ski jumping (1)
