= 1966 Winter Universiade =

Multi-sport event in Sestriere, Italy

IV Winter Universiade IV Universiade invernale
- Host city: Sestriere, Italy
- Nations: 30
- Athletes: 430
- Events: 6 sports
- Opening: February 5, 1966
- Closing: February 13, 1966
- Opened by: Giuseppe Saragat

The 1966 Winter Universiade, the IV Winter Universiade, took place in Sestriere, Italy. 430 athletes, from 30 countries participated.

== Medal table ==
* Host nation (Italy)

Rank	Nation	Gold	Silver	Bronze	Total
1	France (FRA)	5	2	1	8
2	Soviet Union (URS)	4	4	3	11
3	Japan (JPN)	3	2	2	7
4	Switzerland (SUI)	2	2	2	6
5	Bulgaria (BUL)	2	0	0	2
6	Poland (POL)	1	4	3	8
7	Czechoslovakia (TCH)	1	1	4	6
8	Hungary (HUN)	1	0	0	1
9	United States (USA)	0	2	1	3
10	Austria (AUT)	0	1	1	2
11	Romania (ROU)	0	1	0	1
12	Italy (ITA)*	0	0	1	1
12	West Germany (FRG)	0	0	1	1
Totals (13 entries)		19	19	19	57

=== Sports ===
- Alpine skiing (8)
- Cross-country skiing (4)
- Figure skating (4)
- Ice hockey (1)
- Nordic combined (1)
- Ski jumping (1)
