= 1964 Winter Universiade =

Multi-sport event in Špindlerův Mlýn, Czechoslovakia

III Winter Universiade III Zimní univerziáda
- Host city: Špindlerův Mlýn, Czechoslovakia
- Nations: 21
- Athletes: 410
- Events: 5 sports
- Opening: February 11, 1964
- Closing: February 17, 1964
- Opened by: Antonín Novotný

The 1964 Winter Universiade, the III Winter Universiade, took place in Špindlerův Mlýn, Czechoslovakia.

== Medal table ==
* Host nation (Czechoslovakia)

Rank	Nation	Gold	Silver	Bronze	Total
1	Soviet Union (URS)	4	2	3	9
2	West Germany (FRG)	3	2	0	5
3	Austria (AUT)	2	1	2	5
4	Japan (JPN)	1	3	1	5
5	Czechoslovakia (TCH)*	1	2	1	4
6	France (FRA)	1	1	1	3
6	Switzerland (SUI)	1	1	1	3
8	Hungary (HUN)	1	0	0	1
9	Bulgaria (BUL)	0	1	0	1
9	East Germany (GDR)	0	1	0	1
11	Poland (POL)	0	0	4	4
12	Romania (ROU)	0	0	1	1
Totals (12 entries)		14	14	14	42

=== Sports ===
- Alpine skiing (8)
- Cross-country skiing (2)
- Figure skating (3)
- Ice hockey (1)
- Nordic combined (1)
- Ski jumping (1)
