= Sports at the FISU World University Games =

This is a list of sports played in the Summer and Winter FISU World University Games organised by the International University Sports Federation (FISU).

== Summer World University Games ==
Sport (Discipline)	59	61	63	65	67	70	73	75	77	79	81	83	85	87	89	91	93	95	97	99	01	03	05	07	09	11	13	15	17	19	21	25	27	29
Archery																						8	8		10	10		10	10	10	10	10	10	10
Athletics	29	29	29	30	33	33	34	35	34	35	39	40	42	42	42	42	43	43	45	45	45	45	45	46	46	50	50	50	50	50	50	50	51	51
Badminton																								6		6	6	6	6	6	6	6	6	6
Baseball																	1	1										1	1					1
Basketball	1	2	1	2	2	2	2		2	2	2	2	2	2	1	2	2	2	2	2	2	2	2	2	2	2	2	2	2	2	2	6	2	2
Belt wrestling																											19							
Billiards																													4					
Boxing																											10							
Canoeing														13													24							
Chess																										3	3							
Cycling												12														16								
Diving		4	4	4	4	4	4		4	4	4	4	6	6		8	8	8	8	8	12	12	12	12	12	12	12	12	14	15	15	13	15	13
Fencing	8	8	8	8	7	8	7		7	8	8	8	8	8	10	10	10	10	10	10	12	12	12	12	12	12	12	12	12	12	12	12	12	12
Field hockey																2											2							
Football										1			1	1		1	2	1	1	1	2	2	2	2	2	2	2	2	2	2				
Golf																								4		4		4	4				4	
Aerobic gymnastics																										6							4	
Artistic gymnastics		2	4	4	3	4	14		4	12	14	14	14	12		14	14	16	14	14	14	14	14	14	14	14	14	14	14	14	14	14	14	14
Rhythmic gymnactics																5		5	5		8	8	8	8	8	8	8	8	8	8	8	8	8	8
Handball																												2						
Judo					7								9					18		18	18	18		18	18	18	18	18	18	14	16	15	15	15
Roller sports																													12					
Rowing														14	13		14										13	13			15	14	11	
Rugby sevens																											2			2				2
Sailing																				6			7			9				1				
Sambo																											18							
Shooting																								37		34	42	32		15	20			
Softball																								1										1
Swimming	15	15	15	17	21	22	22		22	25	29	30	30	32		32	34	34	34	34	40	40	40	40	40	42	42	42	42	40	42	42	42	42
Synchronised swimming																											4							
Table tennis																					7			7	7	7	7	7	7	7	7	7	7	7
Taekwondo																						16	16	16	21	21		21	23	19	23	24	38	23
Tennis	5	5	5	5	5	5	5		5	5	5	5	5	5		5	5	5	5	5	5	5	5	5	7	7	7	7	7	7	7		7	7
Water polo	1	1	1	1	1	1	1		1	1	1	1	1	1		1	1	1	1	1	1	1	1	1	1	2	2	2	2	2	2	2	2	2
Beach volleyball																										2	2					2	2	
Volleyball	1	2	2	2	2	2	2		2	2	2	2	2	2		2	2	2	2	2	2	2	2	2	2	2	2	2	2	2	2	2	2	2
Weightlifting																										15	15		15					
Wrestling							20		20		20												21				21							
Wushu																													15		19			
Total events	60	68	69	73	85	81	111	35	102	95	124	118	120	138	66	124	136	146	127	148	168	185	195	233	202	304	351	274	276	222	267	234	248	222

== Winter World University Games ==
Sport (Discipline)	60	62	64	66	68	70	72	75	78	81	83	85	87	89	91	93	95	97	99	01	03	05	07	09	11	13	15	17	19	23	25	27
Alpine skiing	7	7	8	8	8	6	6	8	8	8	8	8	10	10	10	8	8	10	10	8	12	8	8	10	8	10	10	9	9	9	21	21
Athletics																																5
Biathlon											3			6		4		6	8	8	10	10	10	9	9	9	9	9	9	9	9	9
Bandy																													2			
Cross-country skiing	2	1	4	4	4	4	7	5	6	6	6	6	6	6	8	8	8	8	8	8	8	8	10	10	11	11	11	11	11	11	15	15
Curling																					2		2	2	2	2	2	2	2	2	3	
Figure skating	2	1	3	4	4	3				3	4	4	4	4	4	4	4	4	4	4	4	4	5	5	5	4	4	3	5	3	3	4
Freestyle skiing																						2		5	4	5	8	9	7	6	10	9
Ice hockey		1		1	1	1	1			1	1	1	1	1	1	1	1	1	1	1	1	1	1	2	2	2	2	2	2	2	2	9
Nordic combined	1	1	1	1	1	1	1		1		1	1	1	1	1	1	1	1	2	2	3	3	3	3	3	3	3	3		3		
Short track speed skating												8		10	10	10	10	10	10	10	10	10	10	10	8	8	8	8	8	9	9	9
Skeleton																						2										
Ski jumping	1	1	1	1	1	1	1		1	1	1	1	2	2	3	3	2	3	3	3	3	4	4	4	4	5	5	5		5		
Ski mountaineering																															5	7
Ski orienteering																													7		3	7
Snowboarding																	4		6	8	6	8	6	6	6	8	8	10	10	10	10	10
Speed skating					4	8	8								10			10				10	12	14		12		14		15		15
Total events	13	12	15	19	23	24	24	13	16	20	22	29	26	40	46	40	38	53	52	52	61	68	71	81	62	78	68	85	76	85	90	112

== See also ==
- Sports at the Olympic Games
- Asian Games sports
