= FISU World University Games =

International multi-sport event for university athletes

- Status: Active
- Genre: Sporting event
- Frequency: Biennial
- Location: Various
- Inaugurated: 1959 (Summer); 1960 (Winter)
- Organiser: FISU
- Website: fisu.net

The FISU World University Games, formerly the Universiade, is an international multi-sport event, organised for university athletes by the International University Sports Federation (FISU). The former name is a portmanteau of the words "University" and "Olympiad".

The Universiade is referred to in English as the World University Games or World Student Games. However, this latter term can also refer to competitions for sub-University grade students. In July 2020 as part of a new branding system by the FISU, it was stated that the Universiade was to be officially branded as the FISU World University Games.

The most recent summer event was the 2025 Summer World University Games held in Rhine-Ruhr region, Germany held from 16-27 July 2025, while the most recent winter event was the 2025 Winter World University Games held in Turin, Italy from 13 to 23 January 2025.

== Background ==
The first modern athletics clubs in the world were founded at Cambridge University in 1857, and Oxford University in 1860. Those universities held Inter-'Varsity Sports, also called The Cambridge and Oxford Athletic Games, from 1864 onwards. Other varsity matches developed between Cambridge and Oxford universities and spread to Harvard University and Yale University in the United States.

English peace campaigner Hodgson Pratt was an early advocate of a global international sports competition between student athletes. He proposed the motion which was passed at the 1891 Universal Peace Congress in Rome to create a series of international student conferences in rotating host capital cities, with activities including art and sport. This did not come to fruition, but a national multi-sport event for university students was created in Germany in 1909 in the form of the Academic Olympia. Five editions were held from 1909 to 1913, all of which were hosted in Germany following the cancellation of an Italy-based event. By 1918, students' union presidents in the United Kingdom expressed the need to have an association to promote sport at universities across the country. The Inter-Varsity Athletics Board of England and Wales (IVAB) was established in 1919 and organised the first inter-varsity track and field meeting that year at Manchester University. In the United States, the National Collegiate Athletic Association (NCAA), at the time a discussion group and rules-making body, organised its first National Collegiate Track and Field Championships in 1921.

== Precursors ==
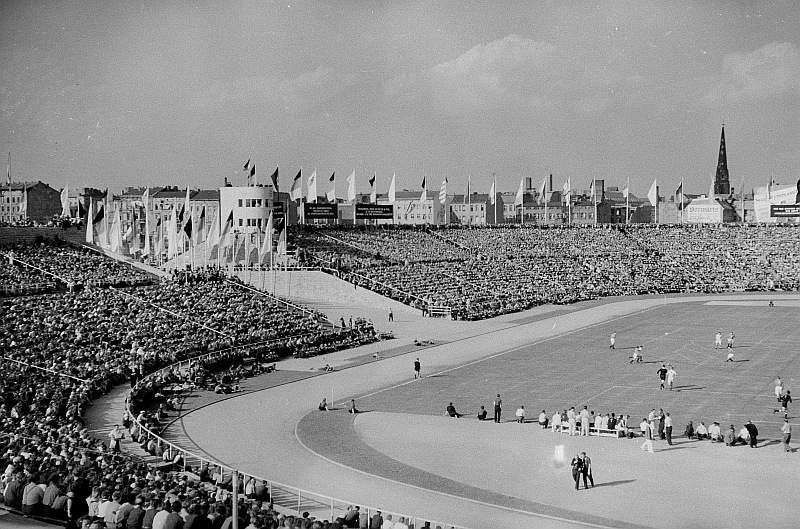
A student football match held at the 3rd World Festival of Youth and Students in 1951

At the start of the 20th century, Jean Petitjean of France began attempting to organise a "University Olympic Games". After discussion with Pierre de Coubertin, the founder of the modern Olympic Games, Petitjean was convinced not to use the word "Olympic" in the tournament's name. Petitjean was the first to build a series of international events, beginning with the 1923 International Universities Championships, organised by the Union Nationale des Étudiants de France (UNEF). This was followed by the renamed 1924 Summer Student World Championships a year later, the first organised by the Confédération Internationale des Étudiants (CIE). Two further editions were held in 1927 and 1928. Another name change resulted in the 1930 International University Games. The CIE's International University Games was held four more times in the 1930s before having its final edition in 1947.

A separate group organised an alternative university games in 1939 in Vienna, in post-Anschluss Germany. The onset of World War II ceased all major international student sport activities and the aftermath also led to division among the movement, as the CIE was disbanded and rival organisations emerged. The Union Internationale des Étudiants (UIE) incorporated a university sports games into the World Festival of Youth and Students from 1947 to 1962, including one separate, unofficial games in 1954. This event principally catered for Eastern European countries.

After the closure of the CIE and the creation of the first UIE-organised games, the International University Sports Federation (FISU) came into being in 1949 and held its own first major student sport event the same year in the form of the 1949 Summer International University Sports Week. The Sports Week was held biennially until 1955. Like the CIE's games before it, the FISU events were initially Western-led sports competitions.

Division between the largely Western European FISU and Eastern European UIE eventually began to dissipate among broadened participation at the 1957 World University Games. This event was not directly organised by either group, instead being organised under the direction of Jean Petitjean (who remained neutral to the split) by the Paris Université Club (PUC), but all respective nations from the groups took part. The FISU-organised Universiade became the direct successor to this competition, maintaining the biennial format into the inaugural 1959 Universiade. It was not until the 1957 World University Games that the Soviet Union began to compete in FISU events. What had primarily been a European competition became a truly global athletics meet. The increased participation ultimately led to the establishment of the Universiade as the primary global student sport championship.

=== Precursor events ===
Although not recognised by the FISU as Universiade or World University Games, the precursor events since 1923 are considered part of its history:

Precursor events
#	Year	Event	Body	Host city	Host country
1	1923	International Universities Championships	UNEF	Paris	France
2	1924	Summer Student World Championships	CIE	Warsaw	Poland
3	1927	Summer Student World Championships	CIE	Rome	Italy
4	1928	Summer Student World Championships	CIE	Paris	France
5	1930	International University Games	CIE	Darmstadt	Germany
6	1933	International University Games	CIE	Turin	Italy
7	1935	International University Games	CIE	Budapest	Hungary
8	1937	International University Games	CIE	Paris	France
9	1939	International University Games	CIE	Monte Carlo	Monaco
–	1939	International University Games (unofficial edition)	NSDStB	Vienna	Germany
10	1947	International University Games	CIE	Paris	France
11	1947	World Festival of Youth and Students	UIE	Prague	Czechoslovakia
12	1949	World Festival of Youth and Students	UIE	Budapest	Hungary
13	1949	Summer International University Sports Week	FISU	Merano	Italy
14	1951	World Festival of Youth and Students	UIE	East Berlin	East Germany
15	1951	Summer International University Sports Week	FISU	Luxembourg	Luxembourg
16	1953	World Festival of Youth and Students	UIE	Bucharest	Romania
17	1953	Summer International University Sports Week	FISU	Dortmund	West Germany
18	1954	World Student Games	UIE	Budapest	Hungary
19	1955	World Festival of Youth and Students	UIE	Warsaw	Poland
20	1955	Summer International University Sports Week	FISU	San Sebastián	Spain
21	1957	World Festival of Youth and Students	UIE	Moscow	Soviet Union
22	1957	World University Games	PUC	Paris	France
23	1959	World Festival of Youth and Students	UIE	Vienna	Austria
24	1962	World Festival of Youth and Students	UIE	Helsinki	Finland

== Editions ==
Former flag of International University Sports Federation

=== Summer Games ===
Locations of host cities of the Summer World University Games (excluding those in Europe)
Locations of host cities of the Summer World University Games (in Europe)

Overview of Summer World University Games
Edition	Year	Host	Games dates / Opened by	Sports	Competitors			Events	Nations	Top nation
Edition	Year	Host	Games dates / Opened by	Sports	Total	Men	Women	Events	Nations	Top nation
1	1959	(Italy) Turin	26 August – 6 September 1959; President Giovanni Gronchi	7	985	865	120	60	45	Italy
2	1961	(Bulgaria) Sofia	26 August – 3 September 1961; Chairman Dimitar Ganev	9	1,270	899	371	68	32	Soviet Union
3	1963	(Brazil) Porto Alegre	30 August – 8 September 1963; Minister Paulo de Tarso Santos	9	713	565	148	79	27	Hungary
4	1965	(Hungary) Budapest	20–30 August 1965; Chairman István Dobi	9	1,729	1,290	439	73	32	Hungary
5	1967	(Japan) Tokyo	27 August – 4 September 1967; Emperor Hirohito	10	938	698	240	87	36	United States
6	1970	(Italy) Turin (Note: Originally scheduled for Lisbon, Portugal in 1969.)	26 August – 6 September 1970; President Giuseppe Saragat	9	2,084	1,542	542	81	58	Soviet Union
7	1973	(Soviet Union) Moscow	16–26 August 1973; Chairman Leonid Brezhnev	10	2,277	1634	643	111	70	Soviet Union
8	1975	(Italy) Rome (Note: Originally scheduled for Belgrade, Yugoslavia.)	18–21 August 1975; President Giovanni Leone	1 (Note: Only athletics was featured.)	468	336	132	35	38	Soviet Union
9	1977	(Bulgaria) Sofia	17–28 August 1977; President Todor Zhivkov	10	2,939	2,181	758	101	78	Soviet Union
10	1979	Mexico City	2–13 September 1979; President José López Portillo	10	2,974	2,262	712	97	94	Soviet Union
11	1981	(Romania) Bucharest	19–30 July 1981; President Nicolae Ceaușescu	10	2,912	2,071	841	124	86	Soviet Union
12	1983	(Canada) Edmonton	1–12 July 1983; Charles, Prince of Wales	10	2,382	1,651	7,31	117	73	Soviet Union
13	1985	(Japan) Kobe	24 August – 4 September 1985; Crown Prince Akihito	11	2,783	2,008	775	120	106	Soviet Union
14	1987	(Socialist Federal Republic of Yugoslavia) Zagreb	8–19 July 1987; President Lazar Mojsov	12	3,905	2,686	1,219	140	121	United States
15	1989	(West Germany) Duisburg (Note: Originally scheduled for São Paulo, Brazil.)	22–30 August 1989; Chancellor Helmut Kohl	4	1,785	1,271	514	66	79	Soviet Union
16	1991	(United Kingdom) Sheffield	14–25 July 1991; Anne, Princess Royal	12	3,346	2,134	1,212	125	101	United States
17	1993	(United States) Buffalo	8–18 July 1993; Primo Nebiolo	12	3,547	2,385	1,162	138	117	United States
18	1995	(Japan) Fukuoka	23 August – 3 September 1995; Crown Prince Naruhito	13	3,949	2,636	1,313	145	162	United States
19	1997	(Italy) Sicily	20–31 August 1997; President Oscar Luigi Scalfaro	11	3,496	2,264	1,232	127	124	United States
20	1999	(Spain) Palma de Mallorca	3–13 July 1999; Infanta Elena, Duchess of Lugo	12	4,076	2,635	1,441	146	125	United States
21	2001	(China) Beijing	22 August – 1 September 2001; President Jiang Zemin	13	3,854	2,705	1,779	168	165	China
22	2003	(South Korea) Daegu	21–31 August 2003; President Roh Moo-hyun	14	4,460	2,622	1,838	185	174	China
23	2005	(Turkey) İzmir	11–21 August 2005; President Ahmet Necdet Sezer	15	5,346	3,187	2,159	196	131	Russia
24	2007	(Thailand) Bangkok	20–31 August 2007; Crown Prince Vajiralongkorn	18	6,093	3,389	2,704	236	152	China
25	2009	(Serbia) Belgrade	1–12 July 2009; Prime Minister Mirko Cvetković	15	5,566	3,203	2,363	203	122	Russia
26	2011	(China) Shenzhen	12–23 August 2011; President Hu Jintao	24	7,155	4,088	3,067	304	151	China
27	2013	(Russia) Kazan	6–17 July 2013; President Vladimir Putin	27	7,966	4,827	3,139	351	159	Russia
28	2015	(South Korea) Gwangju	3–14 July 2015; President Park Geun-hye	21	7,432	4,270	3,162	272	140	South Korea
29	2017	(Chinese Taipei) Taipei (Note: The Republic of China (Taiwan) is recognised as Chinese Taipei by the FISU and the majority of international organisations it participates in due to political considerations and Cross-Strait relations with the People's Republic of China.)	19–30 August 2017; President Tsai Ing-wen	21	7,377	4,189	3,188	271	134	Japan
30	2019	(Italy) Naples (Note: Originally scheduled for Brasília, Brazil.)	3–14 July 2019; President Sergio Mattarella	18	5,893	3,100	2,793	220	111	Japan
31	2021	(China) Chengdu	28 July – 8 August 2023 (Note: Originally scheduled to be held on 15–27 August 2021, but was postponed to 25 June–7 July 2022, and again to 2023 due to the COVID-19 pandemic. With the eventual cancellation of the 2023 Games in Yekaterinburg due to the Russian invasion of Ukraine, this edition replaced the 2023 Games.); President Xi Jinping	18	6,573	3,556	3,017	269	116	China
—	2023	Originally awarded to (Russia) Yekaterinburg. Cancelled due to the Russian invasion of Ukraine								
32	2025	(Germany) Rhine-Ruhr	16–27 July 2025; Minister Bärbel Bas	18	6,233	3,260	2,973	234	113	Japan
33	2027	(South Korea) Chungcheong	1-12 August 2027; TBA	18	TBA	TBA	TBA	248	TBA	TBA
34	2029	(United States) North Carolina	11-22 July 2029; TBA	18	TBA	TBA	TBA	TBA	TBA	TBA

=== Winter Games ===
Locations of host cities of the Winter World University Games (excluding those in Europe)
Locations of host cities of the Winter World University Games (in Europe)

Overview of Winter World University Games events
Edition	Year	Host	Games dates / Opened by	Sports	Competitors			Events	Nations	Top nation
Edition	Year	Host	Games dates / Opened by	Sports	Total	Men	Women	Events	Nations	Top nation
1	1960	(France) Chamonix	28 February – 6 March 1960; President Charles de Gaulle	5	151	106	45	12	15	France
2	1962	(Switzerland) Villars	6–12 March 1962; President Paul Chaudet	6	273	212	61	14	22	West Germany
3	1964	(Czechoslovakia) Špindlerův Mlýn	11–17 February 1964; President Antonín Novotný	5	285	206	79	17	21	West Germany
4	1966	(Italy) Sestriere	5–13 February 1966; President Giuseppe Saragat	6	434	355	79	19	29	Soviet Union
5	1968	(Austria) Innsbruck	21–28 January 1968; President Franz Jonas	7	424	351	73	23	26	Soviet Union
6	1970	(Finland) Rovaniemi	3–9 April 1970; President Urho Kekkonen	7	421	326	95	25	25	Soviet Union
7	1972	(United States) Lake Placid	26 February – 5 March 1972; President Richard Nixon	7	351	279	72	28	22	Soviet Union
8	1975	(Italy) Livigno	6–13 April 1975; President Giovanni Leone	2	143	95	48	14	15	Soviet Union
9	1978	(Czechoslovakia) Špindlerův Mlýn	5–12 February 1978; President Gustáv Husák	4	260	179	81	15	21	Soviet Union
10	1981	(Spain) Jaca	25 February – 4 March 1981; King Juan Carlos I	5	394	287	107	19	28	Soviet Union
11	1983	(Bulgaria) Sofia	17–27 February 1983; Chairman Todor Zhivkov	7	535	409	126	24	31	Soviet Union
12	1985	(Italy) Belluno	16–24 February 1985; President Sandro Pertini	7	538	381	157	27	29	Soviet Union
13	1987	(Czechoslovakia) Štrbské Pleso	21–28 February 1987; President Gustáv Husák	6	596	442	154	22	28	Czechoslovakia
14	1989	(Bulgaria) Sofia	2–12 March 1989; Chairman Todor Zhivkov	8	681	467	214	40	32	Soviet Union
15	1991	(Japan) Sapporo	2–10 March 1991; Crown Prince Naruhito	8	668	461	207	45	34	Japan
16	1993	(Poland) Zakopane	6–14 February 1993; President Lech Wałęsa	8	668	454	214	41	41	Japan
17	1995	(Spain) Jaca	13–26 February 1995; King Juan Carlos I	8	765	542	223	36	41	South Korea
18	1997	(South Korea) Muju–Chonju	24 January – 2 February 1997; President Kim Young-sam	9	877	609	268	53	48	Japan
19	1999	(Slovakia) Poprad-Tatry	22–30 January 1999; President Rudolf Schuster	9	929	644	285	53	40	Russia
20	2001	(Poland) Zakopane	7–17 February 2001; President Aleksander Kwaśniewski	9	1,007	701	306	52	41	Russia
21	2003	(Italy) Tarvisio	16–26 January 2003; President Renzo Tondo	10	1,266	856	410	57	46	Russia
22	2005	(Austria) Innsbruck–Seefeld	12–22 January 2005; President Heinz Fischer	12	1,449	957	492	71	50	Austria
23	2007	(Italy) Turin	17–27 January 2007; FISU President George Killian	11	1,638	964	674	71	48	South Korea
24	2009	(China) Harbin	18–28 February 2009; State councillor Liu Yandong	12	1,545	864	681	81	44	China
25	2011	(Turkey) Erzurum	27 January – 6 February 2011; President Abdullah Gül	11	1,593	920	673	64	52	Russia
26	2013	(Italy) Trentino (Note: Originally scheduled for Maribor, Slovenia.)	11–21 December 2013; President Ugo Rossi	12	1,698	1,035	663	78	50	Russia
27	2015	(Slovakia) Štrbské Pleso–Osrblie (Note: Due to environmental problems in Granada, the Nordic skiing events were transferred to Slovakia.)	24 January – 1 February 2015; President Andrej Kiska	11	1,546	938	608	68	42	Russia
27	2015	(Spain) Granada	4–14 February 2015; King Felipe VI	11	1,546	938	608	68	42	Russia
28	2017	(Kazakhstan) Almaty	29 January – 8 February 2017; President Nursultan Nazarbayev	12	1,620	984	636	85	57	Russia
29	2019	(Russia) Krasnoyarsk	2–12 March 2019; President Vladimir Putin	11	1,692	967	725	76	58	Russia
30	2021	Originally awarded to (Switzerland) Lucerne. Cancelled due to the COVID-19 pandemic								
31	2023	(United States) Lake Placid	12–22 January 2023; Governor Kathy Hochul	12	1,417	824	593	85	46	Japan
32	2025	(Italy) Turin	13–23 January 2025; Minister Andrea Abodi	11	1,503	897	705	90	54	France
33	2027	(China) Changchun	15–25 January 2027; TBA	12	TBA	TBA	TBA	97	TBA	TBA
34	2029	(Turkey) Erzurum	TBA	10	TBA	TBA	TBA	TBA	TBA	TBA

== Sports ==
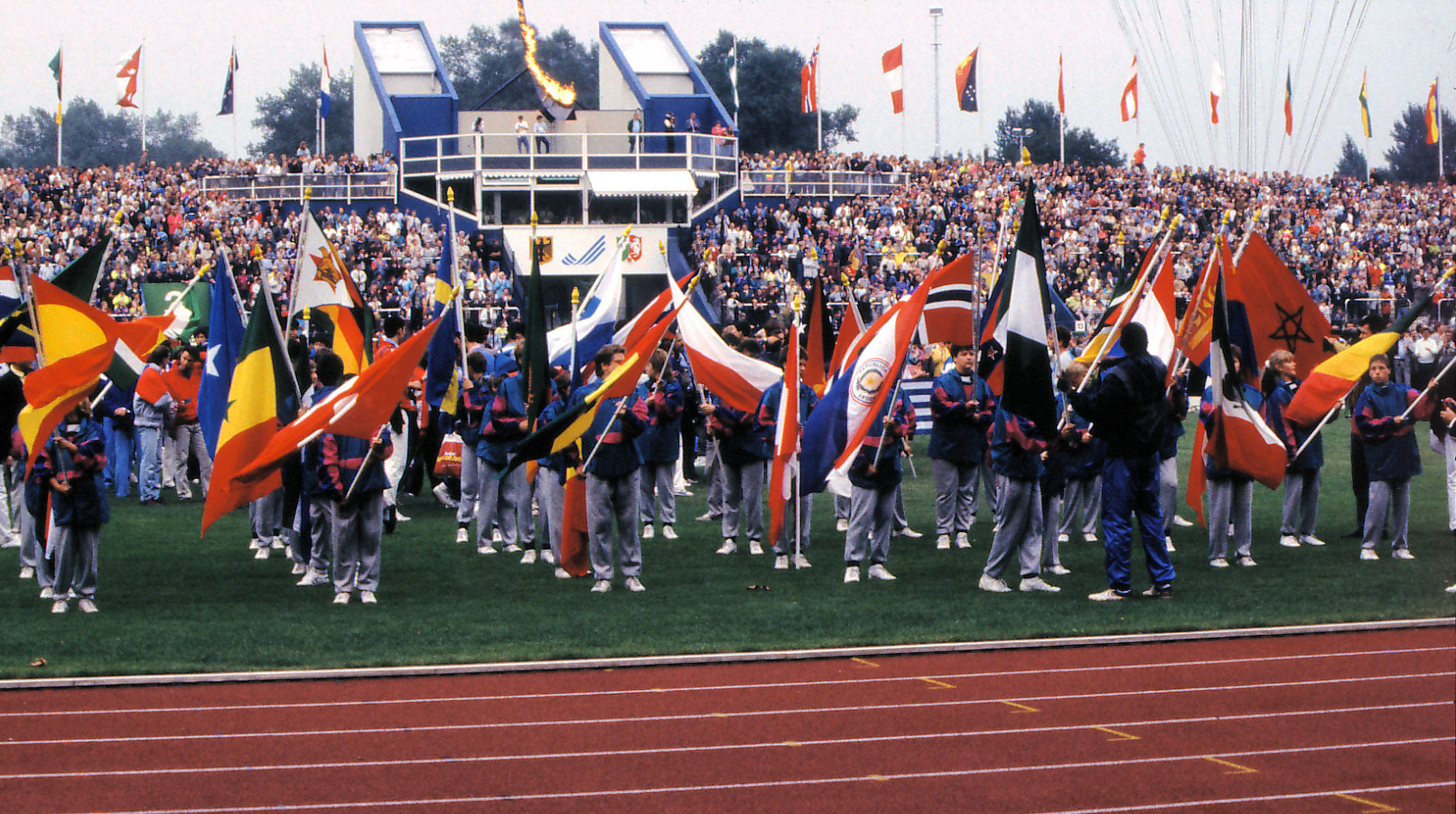
Opening ceremony of the 1989 Summer Universiade

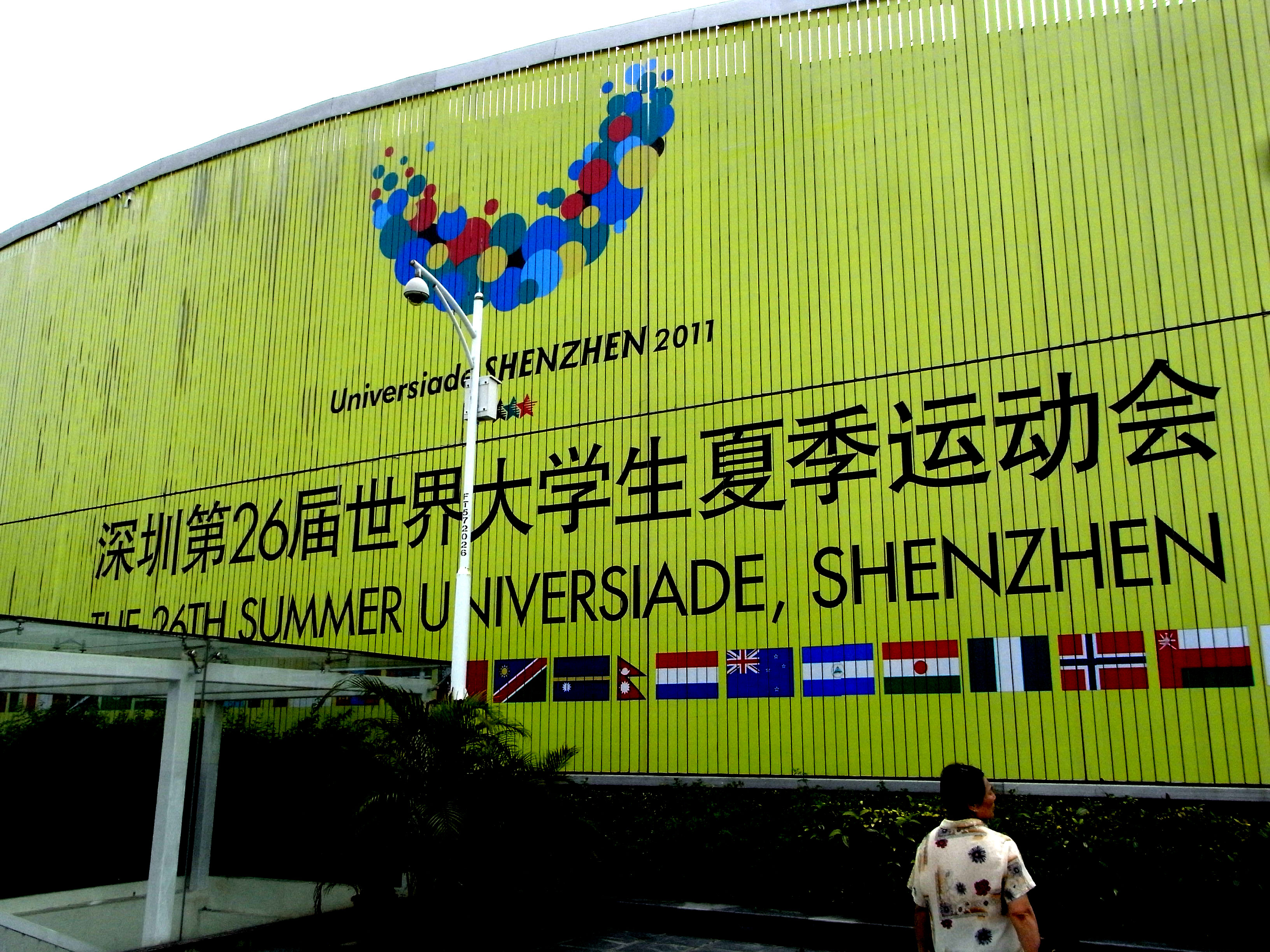
Shenzhen International Garden and Flower Expo Park during the 2011 Summer Universiade

=== Summer Games ===
Since the second edition held in 1961, it has been up to the Organising Committee and the National University Sports Federation of the host country to choose sports or optional competitions. According to their demands, there is a list of mandatory sports that are defined by the International University Sports Federation and could be reviewed at the end of each edition. The event also serves as the World University Championship. At the first edition, only 8 sports were in the programme (athletics, basketball, fencing, gymnastics, swimming, tennis, volleyball and water polo). The first additional sport to be considered optional was diving, which was added to the second edition in 1961. Optional events were added in basketball and volleyball when women's tournaments were played. In 1963, the women's basketball was dropped from the sporting programme. In 1967, the third World University Judo Championship was held in Tokyo and was integrated into the fifth edition of the Summer Universiade as an optional sport, thus gaining the status of an optional sport and thus inaugurating a new type of sport at the event, which is that of the optional sport. Therefore, the sport with this status is not part of the fixed programme and could be in the current edition, but not necessarily in the next one.

==== Compulsory sports ====
===== Team sports =====
1. Basketball at the Summer World University Games
2. Volleyball at the Summer World University Games
3. Water polo at the Summer World University Games

===== Individual sports =====
1. Athletics at the Summer World University Games
2. Swimming at the Summer World University Games: Swimming has been a compulsory event since the first edition in 1959. Open water events were held between 2011 to 2017 and Artistic Swimming was held as an optional sport in 2013.
3. Diving at the Summer World University Games
4. Gymnastics at the Summer World University Games (artistic and rhythmic): Artistic Gymnastics was an optional sport in 1961, turned compulsory in 1963. Rhythmic Gymnastics was an optional sport in 1991, 1995 and 1997, turned compulsory in 2001. An aerobics event was held as an optional event in 2011.
5. Fencing at the Summer World University Games
6. Tennis at the Summer World University Games
7. Table tennis at the Summer World University Games – Compulsory since 2007. Optional sport in 2001.
8. Judo at the Summer World University Games – Compulsory since 2007. Optional sport in 1967, 1985, 1995, 1999 to 2003.
9. Taekwondo at the Summer World University Games – Compulsory since 2017. Optional sport in 2003, 2005, 2007, 2009, 2011 and 2015.
10. Archery at the Summer World University Games – Compulsory since 2019. Optional sport in 2003, 2005, 2009 to 2017.
11. Badminton at the Summer World University Games – Compulsory since 2021. Optional sport in 2007, 2011 to 2017.

==== Optional sports ====
===== Team sports =====
1. Baseball at the Summer World University Games – 4 times (1993, 1995, 2015, 2017, 2029)
2. Beach volleyball at the Summer World University Games – 3 times (2011, 2013, 2025, 2027)
3. Field hockey at the Summer World University Games – 2 times (1991, 2013)
4. Rugby sevens at the Summer World University Games – 2 times (2013, 2019, 2029)
5. Basketball at the Summer World University Games (3x3 basketball) – 1 time (2025)
6. Handball at the Summer World University Games – 1 time (2015)
7. Softball at the Summer World University Games – 1 time (2007, 2029)

===== Individual sports =====
1. Rowing at the Summer World University Games – 7 times (1987, 1989, 1993, 2013, 2015, 2021, 2025, 2027)
2. Shooting at the Summer World University Games – 6 times (2007, 2011, 2013, 2015, 2019 and 2021)
3. Wrestling at the Summer World University Games – 5 times (1973, 1977, 1981, 2005, 2013)
4. Golf at the Summer World University Games – 5 times (2007, 2011, 2015, 2017, 2027)
5. Sailing at the Summer World University Games – 4 times (1999, 2005, 2011, 2019)
6. Weightlifting at the Summer World University Games – 3 times (2011, 2013, 2017)
7. Canoeing at the Summer World University Games – 2 times (1987, 2013)
8. Chess at the Summer World University Games – 2 times (2011, 2013)
9. Cycling at the Summer World University Games – 2 times (1983, 2011)
10. Wushu at the Summer World University Games – 2 times (2017, 2021)
11. Belt wrestling at the Summer World University Games – 1 time (2013)
12. Boxing at the Summer World University Games – 1 time (2013)
13. Roller sports at the Summer World University Games – 1 time (2017)
14. Sambo at the Summer World University Games – 1 time (2013)
15. Synchronised swimming at the Summer World University Games – 1 time (2013)

===== Paralympic sports =====
1. Basketball at the Summer World University Games (Wheelchair 3x3 basketball) – 2 times (2025, 2029)
2. Taekwondo at the Summer World University Games – (Para taekwondo) -1 time (2027)

===== Removed sports =====
1. Football at the Summer World University Games – Obsolescent since 2019, after the creation of the FISU University World Cup Football. Optional sport in 1979, compulsory from 1985 to 2019.

=== Winter Games ===
Since 1960 until 1989, limited and fixed sports were held. Since the 1991 Winter Universiade the host is allowed to choose some sports that are approved by FISU as optional sports.

==== Compulsory sports ====
===== Team sports =====
1. Curling at the Winter World University Games – Compulsory since 2007. Optional sport in 2003.
2. Ice hockey at the Winter World University Games – Compulsory since 1966.

===== Individual sports =====
1. Alpine skiing at the Winter World University Games
2. Biathlon at the Winter World University Games – Compulsory since 1997. Optional sport in 1983, 1989 and in 1993. Not included in 2027 due to environmental and logistical reasons (a separate World University Championship for biathlon will be held in the same year).
3. Cross-country skiing at the Winter World University Games
4. Figure skating at the Winter World University Games – Compulsory since 1981. Optional sport between 1960 to 1979
5. Freestyle skiing at the Winter World University Games – Compulsory since 2023. Optional sport between 2005 to 2019.
6. Snowboarding at the Winter World University Games – Compulsory since 1999. Optional sport in 1995 and 1997.
7. Ski-orienteering at the Winter World University Games – Compulsory since 2027. Optional sport in 2019 and 2025, became compulsory in 2027.
8. Short track speed skating at the Winter World University Games – Compulsory since 1997. Optional sport in 1985 and from 1989 to 1995.

==== Optional sports ====
===== Team sports =====
1. Bandy at the Winter World University Games – 1 time (2019)

===== Individual sports =====
1. Cross-country running at the Winter World University Games – scheduled for 2027
2. Nordic combined at the Winter World University Games – 27 times (1960–1970, 1978, 1981–2023). Compulsory sport from 1960 to 2007,optional from 2011 to 2017 and held in 2023. Planned for 2029.
3. Ski jumping at the Winter World University Games – 25 times (1960–1972, 1978, 1981–2017). Compulsory sport from 1960 to 2007; optional from 2011 to 2017 and held in 2023. Planned for 2029.
4. Ski mountaineering at the Winter World University Games – 2 times (2025 and 2027)
5. Skeleton at the Winter World University Games – 1 time (2005)

===== Special sport status =====
1. Speed skating at the Winter World University Games – 12 times (1968–2027). Sport with special status (1968 to 1972, 1991, 1997, 2005 to 2009, 2013, 2017, 2023, 2027).

== Medals ==
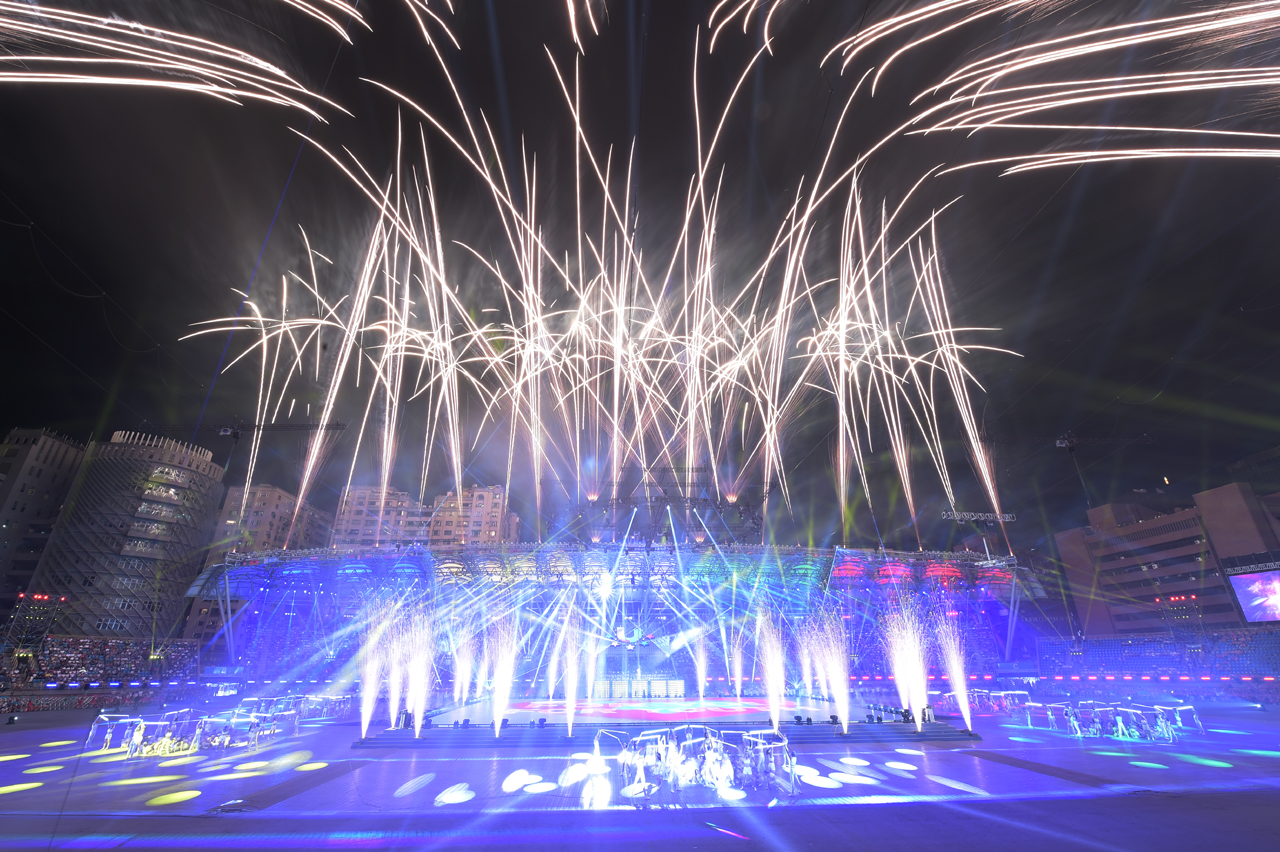
Opening ceremony of the 2017 Summer Universiade

=== Summer Games ===
Rank	NUSF	Gold	Silver	Bronze	Total
1	China (CHN)	576	374	309	1,259
2	United States (USA)	540	480	448	1,468
3	Russia (RUS)	433	364	417	1,214
4	Japan (JPN)	412	390	504	1,306
5	Soviet Union (URS)*	409	337	251	997
6	South Korea (KOR)	281	228	286	795
7	Italy (ITA)	224	236	301	761
8	Ukraine (UKR)	186	191	184	561
9	Romania (ROU)	149	132	150	431
10	Hungary (HUN)	121	116	129	366
Totals (10 entries)		3,331	2,848	2,979	9,158

=== Winter Games ===
Rank	NUSF	Gold	Silver	Bronze	Total
1	Russia (RUS)	208	189	173	570
2	South Korea (KOR)	127	91	86	304
3	Japan (JPN)	122	131	112	365
4	Soviet Union (URS)*	103	98	70	271
5	China (CHN)	80	70	79	229
6	France (FRA)	75	64	76	215
7	Italy (ITA)	61	67	72	200
8	Poland (POL)	60	67	74	201
9	Austria (AUT)	56	56	56	168
10	Czechoslovakia (TCH)*	52	50	27	129
Totals (10 entries)		944	883	825	2,652

== See also ==
- All-Africa University Games
- ASEAN University Games
- European Universities Games
- FISU America Games
- FISU World University Championships
- Gymnasiade
- International Children's Games
- International University Sports Federation
- University and college sport
