= Athletics at the World University Games =

- Events: 50 (men: 25; women: 25)

Games
- 1959; 1960; 1961; 1962; 1963; 1964; 1965; 1966; 1967; 1968; 1970; 1970; 1973; 1972; 1975; 1975; 1977; 1978; 1979; 1981; 1983; 1985; 1987; 1989; 1991; 1993; 1995; 1997; 1999; 2001; 2003; 2005; 2007; 2009; 2011; 2013; 2015; 2017; 2019; 2021; 2025

Athletics is one of the sports at the biennial Summer World University Games competition. Athletics has been a core sport of the Summer World University Games since 1959. Starting in 2027, the Cross Country discipline was also introduced as an optional sport in the Winter World University Games program.

== Editions ==
Games	Year	Events	Host city	Host country	Winner	Second	Third
1	1959	29	Turin	Italy	Italy	Soviet Union	West Germany
2	1961	29	Sofia	Bulgaria	Soviet Union	Hungary	Romania
3	1963	29	Porto Alegre	Brazil	Soviet Union	West Germany	United Kingdom
4	1965	30	Budapest	Hungary	Soviet Union	Italy	Hungary
5	1967	33	Tokyo	Japan	West Germany	United States	Japan
6	1970	33	Turin	Italy	Soviet Union	East Germany	United Kingdom
7	1973	34	Moscow	Soviet Union	Soviet Union	United States	United Kingdom
8	1975	35	Rome	Italy	Soviet Union	Poland	Italy
9	1977	34	Sofia	Bulgaria	Soviet Union	Bulgaria	United States
10	1979	35	Mexico City	Mexico	Soviet Union	East Germany	Romania
11	1981	39	Bucharest	Romania	Soviet Union	United States	East Germany
12	1983	40	Edmonton	Canada	Soviet Union	United States	Nigeria
13	1985	42	Kobe	Japan	Soviet Union	United States	Cuba
14	1987	42	Zagreb	Yugoslavia	United States	Soviet Union	East Germany
15	1989	42	Duisburg	Germany	United States	Soviet Union	Cuba
16	1991	42	Sheffield	United Kingdom	United States	Soviet Union	China
17	1993	43	Buffalo	United States	United States	Poland	Cuba
18	1995	43	Fukuoka	Japan	United States	Russia	Japan
19	1997	45	Catania	Italy	United States	Russia	Ukraine
20	1999	45	Palma de Mallorca	Spain	United States	Romania	Cuba
21	2001	45	Beijing	China	China	United States	Cuba
22	2003	45	Daegu	South Korea	Russia	China	Ukraine
23	2005	45	İzmir	Turkey	Russia	Poland	China
24	2007	46	Bangkok	Thailand	Russia	Ukraine	Kazakhstan
25	2009	46	Belgrade	Serbia	Russia	Australia	Japan
26	2011	50	Shenzhen	China	Russia	Jamaica	Ukraine
27	2013	50	Kazan	Russia	Russia	South Africa	Ukraine
28	2015	50	Gwangju	South Korea	Russia	Japan	Kazakhstan
29	2017	50	Taipei	Taiwan	Japan	Poland	Germany
30	2019	50	Naples	Italy	Japan	Ukraine	Australia
31	2021	50	Chengdu	China	China	Turkey	Poland
32	2023	50	Yekaterinburg	Russia	Cancelled due to the Russian invasion of Ukraine		
33	2025	50	Bochum	Germany	Australia	Germany	Japan
33-W	2027-W	5	Changchun	China			
34	2027	50	Chungju	South Korea			
35	2029	50	Greensboro	United States			

== All time medal table ==
Note
Last updated after the 2025 Summer World University Games

Rank	Nation	Gold	Silver	Bronze	Total
1	Soviet Union (URS)	154	114	103	371
2	United States (USA)	141	113	91	345
3	Russia (RUS)	87	79	63	229
4	Poland (POL)	69	64	51	184
5	Japan (JPN)	63	71	78	212
6	Italy (ITA)	61	47	63	171
7	China (CHN)	55	57	39	151
8	Ukraine (UKR)	51	36	26	113
9	Romania (ROU)	42	45	52	139
10	Cuba (CUB)	39	35	30	104
11	West Germany (FRG)	36	51	50	137
12	Great Britain (GBR)	33	56	62	151
13	Germany (GER)	30	30	39	99
14	Hungary (HUN)	30	30	32	92
15	South Africa (RSA)	28	28	34	90
16	Australia (AUS)	27	19	22	68
17	Turkey (TUR)	23	23	19	65
18	East Germany (GDR)	23	21	17	61
19	Bulgaria (BUL)	21	16	19	56
20	France (FRA)	19	31	49	99
21	Belarus (BLR)	15	15	15	45
22	Jamaica (JAM)	14	15	12	41
23	Finland (FIN)	14	14	17	45
24	Brazil (BRA)	13	8	22	43
25	Nigeria (NGR)	12	11	11	34
26	Portugal (POR)	11	12	5	28
27	Canada (CAN)	10	38	35	83
28	Spain (ESP)	10	14	18	42
29	Yugoslavia (FRY)	10	13	7	30
30	Czech Republic (CZE)	10	10	16	36
31	Kazakhstan (KAZ)	9	11	4	24
32	Morocco (MAR)	9	9	7	25
33	Austria (AUT)	9	6	14	29
34	Kenya (KEN)	8	8	9	25
35	Mexico (MEX)	7	9	5	21
36	South Korea (KOR)	7	7	11	25
37	Netherlands (NED)	6	11	8	25
38	Switzerland (SUI)	6	10	13	29
39	Belgium (BEL)	6	8	12	26
40	Czechoslovakia (TCH)	6	6	7	19
41	Latvia (LAT)	6	5	3	14
41	Uganda (UGA)	6	5	3	14
43	Lithuania (LTU)	5	10	7	22
44	Estonia (EST)	5	4	4	13
45	Azerbaijan (AZE)	5	0	0	5
45	Dominican Republic (DOM)	5	0	0	5
47	Chinese Taipei	4	8	10	22
48	Ireland (IRL)	4	5	7	16
49	New Zealand (NZL)	4	4	7	15
50	Sweden (SWE)	4	3	5	12
51	Moldova (MDA)	4	2	4	10
52	Algeria (ALG)	3	7	9	19
53	North Korea (PRK)	3	2	6	11
54	Serbia (SRB)	3	1	2	6
55	Iran (IRI)	3	1	0	4
56	Greece (GRE)	2	8	8	18
57	Slovakia (SVK)	2	8	3	13
58	India (IND)	2	5	6	13
59	Thailand (THA)	2	4	2	8
60	Slovenia (SLO)	2	3	4	9
61	Norway (NOR)	2	3	2	7
62	Ivory Coast (CIV)	2	1	3	6
63	Luxembourg (LUX)	2	1	1	4
64	Israel (ISR)	2	1	0	3
65	Ghana (GHA)	2	0	1	3
66	Senegal (SEN)	1	5	2	8
67	Egypt (EGY)	1	4	0	5
68	Botswana (BOT)	1	1	2	4
69	Barbados (BAR)	1	1	0	2
69	U.S. Virgin Islands (ISV)	1	1	0	2
71	Kyrgyzstan (KGZ)	1	0	2	3
71	Madagascar (MAD)	1	0	2	3
73	Bermuda (BER)	1	0	1	2
74	Honduras (HON)	1	0	0	1
74	Philippines (PHI)	1	0	0	1
74	Saint Vincent and the Grenadines (VIN)	1	0	0	1
74	Uzbekistan (UZB)	1	0	0	1
78	Cyprus (CYP)	0	3	3	6
79	Burkina Faso (BUR)	0	3	0	3
80	Croatia (CRO)	0	2	3	5
81	Independent Participants	0	2	0	2
81	Ecuador (ECU)	0	2	0	2
83	Denmark (DEN)	0	1	4	5
84	Tunisia (TUN)	0	1	2	3
85	Argentina (ARG)	0	1	1	2
85	Armenia (ARM)	0	1	1	2
85	Mozambique (MOZ)	0	1	1	2
85	Qatar (QAT)	0	1	1	2
89	Albania (ALB)	0	1	0	1
89	Chile (CHI)	0	1	0	1
89	Namibia (NAM)	0	1	0	1
89	Sierra Leone (SLE)	0	1	0	1
89	Tanzania (TAN)	0	1	0	1
89	Trinidad and Tobago (TTO)	0	1	0	1
95	Ethiopia (ETH)	0	0	2	2
95	Puerto Rico (PUR)	0	0	2	2
97	Bahamas (BAH)	0	0	1	1
97	Colombia (COL)	0	0	1	1
97	Hong Kong (HKG)	0	0	1	1
97	Panama (PAN)	0	0	1	1
97	Peru (PER)	0	0	1	1
97	Serbia and Montenegro (SCG)	0	0	1	1
Totals (102 entries)		1,320	1,328	1,319	3,967

== See also ==
- List of Universiade records in athletics
- List of Universiade medalists in athletics (men)
- World University Cross Country Championships
- International Athletics Championships and Games
