= China at the FISU World University Games =

China at the Universiade
- IOC code: CHN
- Medals Ranked 1st: Gold 620 Silver 416 Bronze 377 Total 1,413

People´s Republic of China at the Summer Universiade participated for the first time at the 1977 Summer Universiade. China is ranked 1st in the number of gold medals at the all-time Summer Universiade medal table.

== Medals ==
=== Summer Games ===
Host nation

Edition				
(Italy) Turin 1959	did not participate			
(Bulgaria) Sofia 1961	did not participate			
(Brazil) Porto Alegre 1963	did not participate			
(Hungary) Budapest 1965	did not participate			
(Japan) Tokyo 1967	did not participate			
(Italy) Turin 1970	did not participate			
(Soviet Union) Moscow 1973	did not participate			
(Italy) Rome 1975	did not participate			
(Bulgaria) Sofia 1977	0	0	1	1
Mexico City 1979	1	1	4	6
(Romania) Bucarest 1981	10	6	5	21
(Canada) Edmonton 1983	5	5	4	14
(Japan) Kobe 1985	6	7	6	19
(Socialist Federal Republic of Yugoslavia) Zagreb 1987	11	8	10	29
(West Germany) Duisburg 1989	4	2	5	11
(United Kingdom) Sheffield 1991	21	19	11	51
(United States) Buffalo 1993	17	6	5	28
(Japan) Fukuoka 1995	13	10	16	39
(Italy) Sicily 1997	10	9	7	26
(Spain) Palma de Mallorca 1999	9	6	10	25
(China) Beijing 2001	54	25	24	103
(South Korea) Daegu 2003	41	27	13	81
(Turkey) Ízmir 2005	21	16	12	49
(Thailand) Bangkok 2007	33	31	28	92
(Serbia) Belgrade 2009	22	21	15	58
(China) Shenzhen 2011	74	40	32	146
(Russia) Kazan 2013	28	27	23	78
(South Korea) Gwangju 2015	34	22	16	72
Taipei 2017	9	6	2	17
(Italy) Naples 2019	22	13	8	44
(China) Chengdu 2021	103	40	35	178
(Germany) Rhine-Rühr 2025	30	27	17	76
(South Korea) Chungcheong 2027				
(United States) North Carolina 2029				
Total	576	377	318	1271

=== Winter Games ===
Host nation

Edition				
1960–1979	did not participate			
(Bulgaria) 1983 Sofia	0	0	1	1
(Bulgaria) 1989 Sofia	5	2	6	13
(Japan) 1991 Sapporo	2	1	3	6
(Poland) 1993 Zakopane	6	1	3	10
(Spain) 1995 Jaca	3	4	3	10
(South Korea) 1997 Muju	6	4	6	16
(Slovakia) 1999 Poprad	3	5	6	14
(Poland) 2001 Zakopane	0	3	5	8
(Italy) 2003 Tarvisio	6	2	2	10
(Austria) 2005 Innsbruck	3	6	8	17
(Italy) 2007 Turin	3	6	6	15
(China) 2009 Harbin	18	18	12	48
(Turkey) 2011 Erzurum	3	4	4	10
(Italy) 2013 Trentino	5	2	3	10
(Spain) 2015 Granada/ (Slovakia) Štrbské Pleso	5	0	4	9
(Kazakhstan) 2017 Almaty	4	4	2	10
(Russia) 2019 Krasnoyarsk	1	2	1	4
(United States) 2023 Lake Placid	1	2	1	4
(Italy) 2025 Turin	1	3	1	5
(China) 2027 Changchun				
Total	75	69	77	221

== See also ==
- China at the Olympics
- China at the Paralympics
- China at the Asian Games
