= Russia at the FISU World University Games =

Russia at the Universiade
- IOC code: RUS
- Medals: Gold 647 Silver 558 Bronze 599 Total 1,804

Russia participated in 12 editions of the Universiade, debuting at the 1993 Summer Universiade. The 2013 Summer Universiade was the best for Russia, beating the previous total medal and gold record of the 1973 Summer Universiade, of the then USSR. Furthermore, Russia produced a number of Universiade records, including the total medals won. Russia hosted the 2013 Summer Universiade in Kazan and the 2019 Winter Universiade in Krasnoyarsk.

In reaction to the 2022 Russian invasion of Ukraine, Russian athletes were banned from competing in the 2022 FISU Summer World University Games in Chengdu, China, and FISU postponed Russia's hosting rights for the 2023 Summer World University Games.

== Medal count ==
=== Medals at the Summer Universiade ===
Universiade					Rank
1959–1991	part of (Soviet Union) USSR				
(United States) 1993 Buffalo	0	4	3	7	28
(Japan) 1995 Fukuoka	15	12	23	50	3
(Italy) 1997 Sicily	10	14	10	34	4
(Spain) 1999 Palma de Mallorca	14	18	11	43	2
(China) 2001 Beijing	12	18	20	50	3
(South Korea) 2003 Daegu	26	22	34	82	2
(Turkey) 2005 Izmir	26	16	23	65	1
(Thailand) 2007 Bangkok	28	28	39	95	2
(Serbia) 2009 Belgrade	29	22	27	76	1
(China) 2011 Shenzhen	42	43	45	130	2
(Russia) 2013 Kazan	150	73	60	283	1
(South Korea) 2015 Gwangju	34	39	47	122	2
2017 Taipei	25	31	38	94	4
(Italy) 2019 Naples	22	24	36	82	2
(China) 2021 Chengdu	did not participate				
(Germany) 2025 Rhine-Ruhr	as part of the Individual Neutral Athletes (AIN)				
Total	433	364	416	1,213	3

=== Medals at the Winter Universiade ===
Universiade					Rank
1960–1991	part of (Soviet Union) USSR				
(Poland) 1993 Zakopane	5	2	4	12	4
(Spain) 1995 Jaca	6	3	3	12	2
(South Korea) 1997 Muju	9	6	9	24	2
(Slovakia) 1999 Poprad	8	11	11	30	1
(Poland) 2001 Zakopane	14	9	8	31	1
(Italy) 2003 Tarvisio	12	10	10	32	1
(Austria) 2005 Innsbruck	7	5	9	21	3
(Italy) 2007 Turin	9	14	12	35	2
(China) 2009 Harbin	18	14	19	51	2
(Turkey) 2011 Erzurum	14	14	11	39	1
(Italy) 2013 Trentino	15	16	19	50	1
(Spain) 2015 Granada/ (Slovakia) Štrbské Pleso	20	18	18	56	1
(Kazakhstan) 2017 Almaty	29	27	15	71	1
(Russia) 2019 Krasnoyarsk	41	39	32	112	1
(United States) 2023 Lake Placid	did not participate				
(Italy) 2025 Turin	did not participate				
Total	208	188	173	569	1

== See also ==
- Russia at the Olympics
- Russia at the Paralympics
