= Wushu at the Summer World University Games =

- Events: 20 (men: 10; women: 10)

Games
- 1959; 1960; 1961; 1962; 1963; 1964; 1965; 1966; 1967; 1968; 1970; 1970; 1973; 1972; 1975; 1975; 1977; 1978; 1979; 1981; 1983; 1985; 1987; 1989; 1991; 1993; 1995; 1997; 1999; 2001; 2003; 2005; 2007; 2009; 2011; 2013; 2015; 2017; 2019; 2021; 2025

Wushu at the Universiade has only been contested once in 2017 as an optional sport. In 2021, it returned with the same status.

== Editions ==
Games	Year	Host city	Host country	Best nation
XXIX	2017	Taipei	Taiwan	China
XXXI	2021	Chengdu	China	China

=== Medal table ===
Last Updated after 2021 Summer World University Games

Rank	Nation	Gold	Silver	Bronze	Total
1	China (CHN)	18	2	1	21
2	Iran (IRI)	4	3	5	12
3	Indonesia (INA)	4	3	2	9
4	Macau (MAC)	3	3	3	9
5	Chinese Taipei (TPE)	2	4	4	10
6	Malaysia (MAS)	1	2	4	7
7	South Korea (KOR)	1	2	3	6
8	Hong Kong (HKG)	1	1	3	5
9	Russia (RUS)	0	3	1	4
10	Japan (JPN)	0	2	5	7
11	Turkey (TUR)	0	2	3	5
12	Kazakhstan (KAZ)	0	1	3	4
13	United States (USA)	0	1	2	3
14	Uzbekistan (UZB)	0	1	1	2
15	Brunei (BRU)	0	1	0	1
15	France (FRA)	0	1	0	1
15	Philippines (PHI)	0	1	0	1
15	Singapore (SIN)	0	1	0	1
19	Armenia (ARM)	0	0	2	2
20	Thailand (THA)	0	0	1	1
20	Turkmenistan (TKM)	0	0	1	1
20	Ukraine (UKR)	0	0	1	1
20	Vietnam (VIE)	0	0	1	1
Totals (23 entries)		34	34	46	114
