= Beach volleyball at the Summer World University Games =

- Events: 2 (men: 1; women: 1)

Games
- 1959; 1960; 1961; 1962; 1963; 1964; 1965; 1966; 1967; 1968; 1970; 1970; 1973; 1972; 1975; 1975; 1977; 1978; 1979; 1981; 1983; 1985; 1987; 1989; 1991; 1993; 1995; 1997; 1999; 2001; 2003; 2005; 2007; 2009; 2011; 2013; 2015; 2017; 2019; 2021; 2025

Beach volleyball competition has been in the Universiade in 2011 and 2013 as optional sport.

== Events ==
Event	11	13	25	27
Men's Team	•	•	•	•
Women's Team	•	•	•	•
Events	2	2	2	2

== Medal winners ==
=== Men ===
Games	Gold	Silver	Bronze
2011	(Poland) Poland; Michal Kadziola; Jakub Szalankiewicz	(Russia) Russia; Sergey Prokopyev; Yury Bogatov	(Ukraine) Ukraine; Sergiy Popov; Valeriy Samoday
2013	(Poland) Poland; Michał Kądzioła; Jakub Szałankiewicz	(Germany) Germany; Armin Dollinger; Jonas Schröder	(Russia) Russia; Yaroslav Koshkarev; Konstantin Semenov
2025	(Germany) Germany; Philipp Huster; Maximilian Just	(Netherlands) Netherlands; Quinten Gronewold; Tom Sonneville	(France) France; Elouan Chouikh-Barbez; Joadel Gardoque

=== Women ===
Games	Gold	Silver	Bronze
2011	(Germany) Germany; Karla Borger; Britta Buethe	(United States) United States; Heather Hughes; Emily Day	(Brazil) Brazil; Elize Maia Secomandi; Ágatha Bednarczuk
2013	(Russia) Russia; Ekaterina Khomyakova; Evgenia Ukolova	(Poland) Poland; Kinga Kołosińska; Monika Brzostek	(Germany) Germany; Julia Sude; Chantal Laboureur
2025	(Switzerland) Switzerland; Menia Bentele; Annique Niederhauser	(Netherlands) Netherlands; Nigella Negenman; Floor Hogenhout	(United States) United States; Alexis Durish; Audrey Koenig

== Medal table ==
Last updated after the 2025 Summer Universiade

Rank	Nation	Gold	Silver	Bronze	Total
1	Germany (GER)	2	1	1	4
2	Poland (POL)	2	1	0	3
3	Russia (RUS)	1	1	1	3
4	Switzerland (SUI)	1	0	0	1
5	Netherlands (NED)	0	2	0	2
6	United States (USA)	0	1	1	2
7	Brazil (BRA)	0	0	1	1
7	France (FRA)	0	0	1	1
7	Ukraine (UKR)	0	0	1	1
Totals (9 entries)		6	6	6	18
