= Taekwondo at the Summer World University Games =

Taekwondo competition

- Events: 23 (men: 11; women: 11; mixed: 1)

Games
- 1959; 1960; 1961; 1962; 1963; 1964; 1965; 1966; 1967; 1968; 1970; 1970; 1973; 1972; 1975; 1975; 1977; 1978; 1979; 1981; 1983; 1985; 1987; 1989; 1991; 1993; 1995; 1997; 1999; 2001; 2003; 2005; 2007; 2009; 2011; 2013; 2015; 2017; 2019; 2021; 2025

Taekwondo events have been contested at Universiade since the 2003 Games in Daegu, South Korea, with one exception, in 2013, in Kazan, Russia.Para taekwondo events are scheduled for the 2027 Summer Universiade as the paralympic event.

== Editions ==
Games	Year	Host city	Host country	Winner	Second	Third
XXII	2003	Daegu	South Korea	South Korea	Chinese Taipei	United States
XXIII	2005	İzmir	Turkey	South Korea	Turkey	China
XXIV	2007	Bangkok	Thailand	South Korea	Thailand	Chinese Taipei
XXV	2009	Belgrade	Serbia	South Korea	Iran	Spain
XXVI	2011	Shenzhen	China	South Korea	China	Russia
XXVIII	2015	Gwangju	South Korea	South Korea	Iran	China
XXVIX	2017	Taipei	Taiwan	South Korea	Iran	Russia
XXX	2019	Naples	Italy	South Korea	Iran	Chinese Taipei
XXXI	2021	Chengdu	China	China	South Korea	Iran
XXXII	2025	Essen	Germany	South Korea	China	Turkey
XXXIII	2027	Chungju	South Korea			

== Events ==
Medals are awarded in ten different weight classes for both men and women.

Event	Men	Women
Featherweight	–54 kg	–47 kg
Extra lightweight	54–58 kg	47–51 kg
Half lightweight	58–62 kg	51–55 kg
Lightweight	62–67 kg	55–59 kg
Half middleweight	67–72 kg	59–63 kg
Middleweight	72–78 kg	63–67 kg
Half heavyweight	78–84 kg	67–72 kg
Heavyweight	+84 kg	+72 kg
Poomsae individual	X	X
Poomsae freestyle	X	X
Poomsae team	X	X
Kyorugi team	X	X

== Medal table ==
Last updated after the 2025 Summer World University Games

Rank	Nation	Gold	Silver	Bronze	Total
1	South Korea (KOR)	70	30	33	133
2	Iran (IRI)	25	17	31	73
3	China (CHN)	22	18	17	57
4	Turkey (TUR)	16	17	22	55
5	Chinese Taipei (TPE)	12	32	32	76
6	Thailand (THA)	11	9	18	38
7	Russia (RUS)	9	6	19	34
8	United States (USA)	4	5	20	29
9	France (FRA)	4	3	14	21
10	Kazakhstan (KAZ)	4	3	10	17
11	Spain (ESP)	3	8	14	25
12	Brazil (BRA)	3	4	9	16
13	Ukraine (UKR)	3	1	6	10
14	Uzbekistan (UZB)	2	6	6	14
15	Serbia (SRB)	2	1	5	8
16	Netherlands (NED)	2	0	6	8
17	Vietnam (VIE)	1	3	15	19
18	Italy (ITA)	1	3	10	14
19	Belgium (BEL)	1	3	2	6
20	Azerbaijan (AZE)	1	1	6	8
21	Australia (AUS)	1	0	5	6
22	Canada (CAN)	1	0	3	4
23	Denmark (DEN)	1	0	0	1
23	Georgia (GEO)	1	0	0	1
23	Switzerland (SUI)	1	0	0	1
26	Croatia (CRO)	0	4	8	12
27	Mexico (MEX)	0	3	25	28
28	Poland (POL)	0	3	7	10
29	Egypt (EGY)	0	3	4	7
30	Portugal (POR)	0	3	1	4
31	Germany (GER)	0	2	10	12
32	Belarus (BLR)	0	2	6	8
33	Cyprus (CYP)	0	1	4	5
34	Indonesia (INA)	0	1	3	4
34	Malaysia (MAS)	0	1	3	4
36	Morocco (MAR)	0	1	2	3
36	Tunisia (TUN)	0	1	2	3
38	Ivory Coast (CIV)	0	1	1	2
38	Norway (NOR)	0	1	1	2
38	Philippines (PHI)	0	1	1	2
41	Argentina (ARG)	0	1	0	1
41	Czech Republic (CZE)	0	1	0	1
41	Mongolia (MGL)	0	1	0	1
44	Armenia (ARM)	0	0	5	5
45	Great Britain (GBR)	0	0	3	3
45	Greece (GRE)	0	0	3	3
47	Cuba (CUB)	0	0	2	2
47	Hungary (HUN)	0	0	2	2
47	Moldova (MDA)	0	0	2	2
50	Chile (CHI)	0	0	1	1
50	Israel (ISR)	0	0	1	1
50	Japan (JPN)	0	0	1	1
50	Jordan (JOR)	0	0	1	1
50	Kyrgyzstan (KGZ)	0	0	1	1
50	Latvia (LAT)	0	0	1	1
50	Senegal (SEN)	0	0	1	1
50	Sweden (SWE)	0	0	1	1
Totals (57 entries)		201	201	406	808
