= Softball at the Summer World University Games =

Softball competition has been part of the Universiade only in 2007, as an optional sport.

== Events ==
Event	07
Women's Team	•
Events	1

== Medal table ==
Last updated after the 2007 Summer Universiade

Rank	Nation	Gold	Silver	Bronze	Total
1	Canada (CAN)	1	0	0	1
2	Chinese Taipei (TPE)	0	1	0	1
3	Japan (JPN)	0	0	1	1
Totals (3 entries)		1	1	1	3
