= Chess at the Summer World University Games =

Presence of competitive chess in Universiade 2011 and 2013

- Events: 3 (men: 1; women: 1; mixed: 1)

Games
- 1959; 1960; 1961; 1962; 1963; 1964; 1965; 1966; 1967; 1968; 1970; 1970; 1973; 1972; 1975; 1975; 1977; 1978; 1979; 1981; 1983; 1985; 1987; 1989; 1991; 1993; 1995; 1997; 1999; 2001; 2003; 2005; 2007; 2009; 2011; 2013; 2015; 2017; 2019; 2021; 2025

Chess competitions have been in the Universiade in 2011 and 2013 as an optional sport.

== Events ==
Event	11	13
Men's individual	•	•
Women's individual	•	•
Mixed team	•	•
Events	3	3

== Medal winners ==
=== Men's individual ===
Games	Gold	Silver	Bronze
2011	(China) Li Chao	(China) Wang Hao	(China) Wang Yue
2013	(Philippines) Wesley So	(Armenia) Zaven Andriasian	(China) Li Chao

=== Women's individual ===
Games	Gold	Silver	Bronze
2011	(China) Tan Zhongyi	(Mongolia) Batkhuyagiin Möngöntuul	(China) Huang Qian
2013	(China) Zhao Xue	(China) Ju Wenjun	(China) Tan Zhongyi

=== Mixed teams ===
Games	Gold	Silver	Bronze
2011	(China) China; Li Chao; Tan Zhongyi; Wang Hao	(Ukraine) Ukraine; Martyn Kravtsiv; Iurii Vovk; Olha Kalinina	(Georgia (country)) Georgia; Nino Batsiashvili; Maka Purtseladze; Luka Paichadze
2013	(China) China; Li Chao; Ju Wenjun; Zhao Xue	(Russia) Russia; Anastasia Bodnaruk; Maxim Matlakov; Anastasia Savina	(Poland) Poland; Klaudia Kulon; Wojciech Moranda; Jacek Tomczak

== Medal table ==
Last updated after the 2013 Summer Universiade

Rank	Nation	Gold	Silver	Bronze	Total
1	China (CHN)	5	2	4	11
2	Philippines (PHI)	1	0	0	1
3	Armenia (ARM)	0	1	0	1
3	Mongolia (MGL)	0	1	0	1
3	Russia (RUS)	0	1	0	1
3	Ukraine (UKR)	0	1	0	1
7	Georgia (GEO)	0	0	1	1
7	Poland (POL)	0	0	1	1
Totals (8 entries)		6	6	6	18
