= Softball at the 2007 Summer Universiade =

The softball competition at the 2007 Summer Universiade was held at the Softball Stadium of the Srinakharinwirot University and at the Softball Field of the Thammasat University in Bangkok, Thailand, from 11 to 17 August 2007.

== First stage ==
Group A

| Rank | | (Canada) | (Chinese Taipei) | (Italy) | (Thailand) | (South Africa) | Games | V | L | Coeff. | P+ | P− |
|---|---|---|---|---|---|---|---|---|---|---|---|---|
| 1 | Canada | – | 6-0 | 9-0 | 9-0 | 15-0 | 4 | 4 | 0 | 1,000 | 39 | 0 |
| 2 | Chinese Taipei | 0-6 | – | 7-2 | 7-0 | 18-2 | 4 | 3 | 1 | 0,750 | 32 | 10 |
| 3 | Italy | 0-9 | 2-7 | – | 5-4 | 17-0 | 4 | 2 | 2 | 0,500 | 24 | 20 |
| 4 | Thailand | 0-9 | 0-7 | 4-5 | – | 7-0 | 4 | 1 | 3 | 0,250 | 11 | 21 |
| 5 | South Africa | 0-15 | 2-18 | 0-17 | 0-7 | – | 4 | 0 | 4 | 0,000 | 2 | 57 |

Group B

| Rank | | (South Korea) | (United States) | (Australia) | (Japan) | (Czech Republic) | Games | V | L | Coeff. | P+ | P− |
|---|---|---|---|---|---|---|---|---|---|---|---|---|
| 1 | South Korea | – | 6-5 | 4-3 | 2-1 | 6-0 | 4 | 4 | 0 | 1,000 | 18 | 9 |
| 2 | United States | 5-6 | – | 3-0 | 3-2 | 3-1 | 4 | 3 | 1 | 0,750 | 14 | 9 |
| 3 | Australia | 3-4 | 0-3 | – | 2-0 | 3-1 | 4 | 2 | 2 | 0,500 | 8 | 8 |
| 4 | Japan | 1-2 | 2-3 | 0-2 | – | 7-0 | 4 | 1 | 3 | 0,250 | 10 | 7 |
| 5 | Czech Republic | 0-6 | 1-3 | 1-3 | 0-7 | – | 4 | 0 | 4 | 0,000 | 2 | 19 |

== Game for the ninth place ==
| 15 August | 10:00 | Czech Republic | 15 – 0 | South Africa |

== Second stage ==
Group C

| 15 August | 9:00 | Italy | 0 – 2 | Japan |
| 15 August | 16:30 | Canada | 9 – 2 | United States |
| 16 August | 9:00 | United States | 1 – 9 | Japan |

Group D

| 15 August | 11:30 | Thailand | 1 – 14 | Australia |
| 15 August | 14:00 | South Korea | 0 – 6 | Chinese Taipei |
| 16 August | 11:30 | South Korea | 2 – 3 | Australia |

== Final ==
Semifinals
Canada | 2
Chinese Taipei | 1
Japan | 3
Australia | 2

Bronze final
Chinese Taipei | 7
Japan | 0

Final
Canada | 5
Chinese Taipei | 4

== Final ranking ==
| Rank | Team |
|---|---|
| | Canada |
| | Chinese Taipei |
| | Japan |
| 4 | Australia |
| 5 | South Korea |
| 6 | United States |
| 7 | Italy |
| 8 | Thailand |
| 9 | Czech Republic |
| 10 | South Africa |
