= Boxing at the Summer World University Games =

Boxing competitions

- Events: 10 (men)

Games
- 1959; 1960; 1961; 1962; 1963; 1964; 1965; 1966; 1967; 1968; 1970; 1970; 1973; 1972; 1975; 1975; 1977; 1978; 1979; 1981; 1983; 1985; 1987; 1989; 1991; 1993; 1995; 1997; 1999; 2001; 2003; 2005; 2007; 2009; 2011; 2013; 2015; 2017; 2019; 2021; 2025

Boxing competitions were contested in the Universiade only in 2013 as an optional sport.

== Events ==
Event	13
Men's light flyweight	•
Men's flyweight	•
Men's bantamweight	•
Men's lightweight	•
Men's light welterweight	•
Men's welterweight	•
Men's middleweight	•
Men's light heavyweight	•
Men's heavyweight	•
Men's super heavyweight	•
Events	10

== Medal table ==
=== Medal table ===
Rank	Nation	Gold	Silver	Bronze	Total
1	Russia (RUS)	6	2	0	8
2	Ukraine (UKR)	2	0	1	3
3	Uzbekistan (UZB)	1	4	3	8
4	Mongolia (MGL)	1	0	5	6
5	Kazakhstan (KAZ)	0	2	2	4
6	Armenia (ARM)	0	1	1	2
6	South Korea (KOR)	0	1	1	2
8	Belarus (BLR)	0	0	2	2
8	Moldova (MDA)	0	0	2	2
10	France (FRA)	0	0	1	1
10	Lithuania (LTU)	0	0	1	1
10	Turkey (TUR)	0	0	1	1
Totals (12 entries)		10	10	20	40
