= 1970 Winter Universiade =

Multi-sport event in Rovaniemi, Finland

VI Winter Universiade VI Talviuniversiadit VI Vinteruniversiaden
- Host city: Rovaniemi, Finland
- Country: Finland
- Nations: 25
- Athletes: 591
- Events: 7 sports
- Opening: April 3, 1970
- Closing: April 9, 1970
- Opened by: Urho Kekkonen

The 1970 Winter Universiade, the 6th Winter Universiade, an international multi-sport event, organized for university athletes, took place in Rovaniemi, Finland. 416 athletes from 25 countries participated in the games.

== Medal table ==
* Host nation (Finland)

| Rank | Nation | Gold | Silver | Bronze | Total |
|---|---|---|---|---|---|
| 1 | Soviet Union (URS) | 14 | 16 | 7 | 37 |
| 2 | United States (USA) | 5 | 5 | 1 | 11 |
| 3 | Czechoslovakia (TCH) | 3 | 0 | 0 | 3 |
| 4 | West Germany (FRG) | 2 | 0 | 2 | 4 |
| 5 | East Germany (GDR) | 1 | 1 | 3 | 5 |
| 6 | Hungary (HUN) | 1 | 0 | 0 | 1 |
| 7 | Poland (POL) | 0 | 2 | 1 | 3 |
| 8 | North Korea (PRK) | 0 | 1 | 1 | 2 |
| 9 | Austria (AUT) | 0 | 0 | 3 | 3 |
| 10 | Japan (JPN) | 0 | 0 | 2 | 2 |
| 11 | Finland (FIN)* | 0 | 0 | 1 | 1 |
| 11 | France (FRA) | 0 | 0 | 1 | 1 |
| Totals (12 entries) | | 26 | 25 | 22 | 73 |

=== Sports ===
- Alpine skiing (6)
- Cross-country skiing (4)
- Figure skating (3)
- Ice hockey (1)
- Nordic combined (1)
- Ski jumping (1)
- Speed skating (8)

== Participating nations ==
- Austria
- Bulgaria
- Canada
- Czechoslovakia
- Finland
- France
- West Germany
- Great Britain
- Greece
- Hungary
- Italy
- Japan
- Mongolia
- Netherlands
- North Korea
- Norway
- Poland
- Romania
- Soviet Union
- Spain
- Sweden
- Switzerland
- United States
- Yugoslavia
