= Shenzhen International Garden and Flower Expo Park =

Park in Shenzhen, China

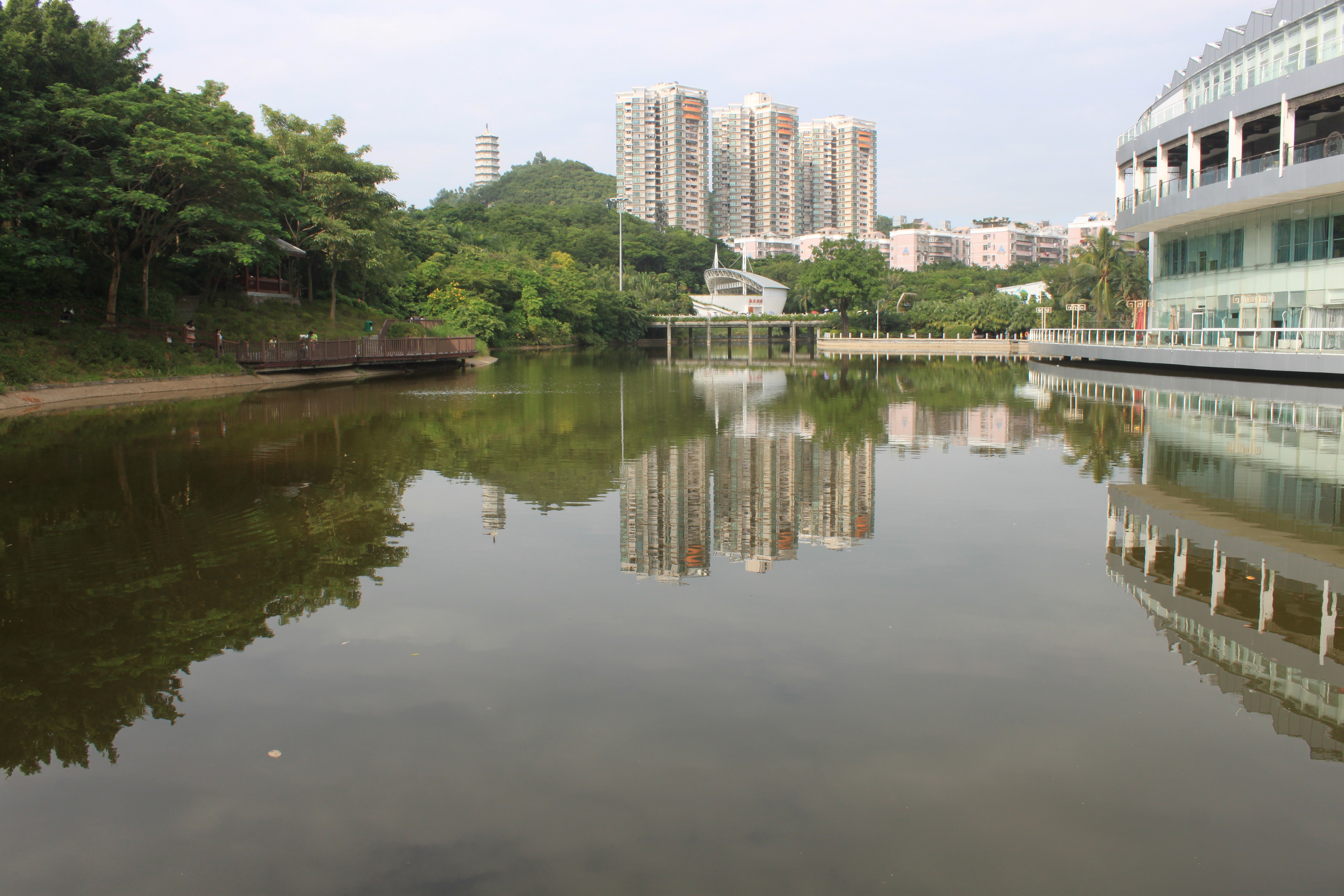
- Huicui Lake of Shenzhen International Garden and Flower Expo Park.

- Location within Guangdong Location within China
- Type: Public park, urban park
- Location: Futian District, Shenzhen, Guangdong, China
- Coordinates: 22°32′39″N 114°00′37″E
- Area: 660,000 square metres (7,100,000 sq ft)
- Created: September 30, 2004
- Operator: Shenzhen Municipal People's Government
- Open: All year

Shenzhen International Garden and Flower Expo Park (simplified Chinese: 深圳国际园林花卉博览园; traditional Chinese: 深圳國際園林花卉博覽園; pinyin: Shēnzhèn Guójì Yuánlín Huāhuì Bólànyuán; referred to as Garden Expo Park) is a public, urban park in Futian District, Shenzhen, Guangdong, China. Located in West Zhuzilin, Shenzhen International Garden and Flower Expo Park is bordered by Shennan Avenue on the South, Qiaochengdong Road on the West, Qiaoxiang Road on the North, and Guangshen Expressway on the East. It covers an area of 660,000 square metres (7,100,000 sq ft). It serves multiple functions, including garden and flower expo, arts and culture, science education, tourism, exhibitions, and solar power grid-connected electricity generation. It officially opened on September 23, 2004, which was awarded the title of "National Key Park" by Ministry of Housing and Urban-Rural Development on September 12, 2008.

== History ==
Shenzhen International Garden and Flower Expo Park was a part of the Huangniulong green isolation belt and the venue for the Fifth China International Garden and Flower Exposition co-hosted by Ministry of Housing and Urban-Rural Development (formerly Ministry of Development) and Shenzhen Municipal People's Government. Its theme is "Nature, Home, Bright Future".

== Tourist attractions ==
The Park is divided into three scenic areas, including the West Area, the North Area and the East Area.

=== West Area ===
Title	Chinese title	Notes
South Entrance	南门	
Yingbin Square	迎宾广场	
Comprehensive Exhibition Hall	综合展馆	
Vision Wall	景观墙	
Yingcui Bridge	映翠桥	
Music Fountain	音乐喷泉	
Huanle Bridge	欢乐桥	
Huanle Theater	欢乐剧场	
Baibu Stairway	百步云梯	
Tianhai Square	天海广场	
Jinghuayuan Scenic Spot	镜·花·缘	
Tianjin Garden	津深情	
Butterfly Garden	蝶园	
Xiamen Garden - Piano Rhythm on Aigret Island	厦门苑·鹭岛琴韵	
Pakistan Pavilion	巴基斯坦亭阁	
Japanese Court	日本庭院	
Landscape Longgang, Hakka Custom	山海龙岗，客家风情	
Bolan Bridge	博览桥	
Yueqing Garden	粤清园	
Dinosaur Exhibition Hall	恐龙馆	
Coastlal Pearl	滨海明珠	
Charm of Maoming	茂名风韵	
Yat-sen Garden	逸仙园	
Lovely Wuyi	情浓五邑	
Bougainvillea Garden	深圳·市花园	
Nanshan Garden	南山园	
West Entrance	西门	
Park Center Office Building	公园管理中心办公楼	
New Hakka House	客家新居	
Xanadu	世外桃源	
Dream Garden	梦园	
Qinxiang Garden	沁香园	
New Hakka Legend	新客家传说	
Heqing Tea Room	和清茶舍	
Tuo Garden	鮀园	
Gongsheng Art Space	共生艺术空间	
Qingfeng Garden	清风园	
Beihai Silver Beach	北海银滩	
Hometown of Sailboat-Qingdao	帆船之都—青岛	
Marching Companions	相伴相行	
Baipo's Family	柏坡人家	
Ningcui Garden	凝翠园	
Bao Zheng Garden	包公园	
Stone Forest	石林	
Tongle Garden	童乐园	
Yunmeng Futian	云梦福田	
Houston Star Garden	休斯顿星球花园	
Flowering Huacheng	花开花城	
Mingcui Lake	鸣翠湖	
New Shikumen	石库新苑	
Dongpo Garden	东坡园	
Phoebe Garden of Canada	加拿大月亮花园	
French Garden	法国园	
Bolivian Garden	玻利维亚花园	
Nepal Garden	尼泊尔花园	
Rock Garden	石缘	

=== North Area ===
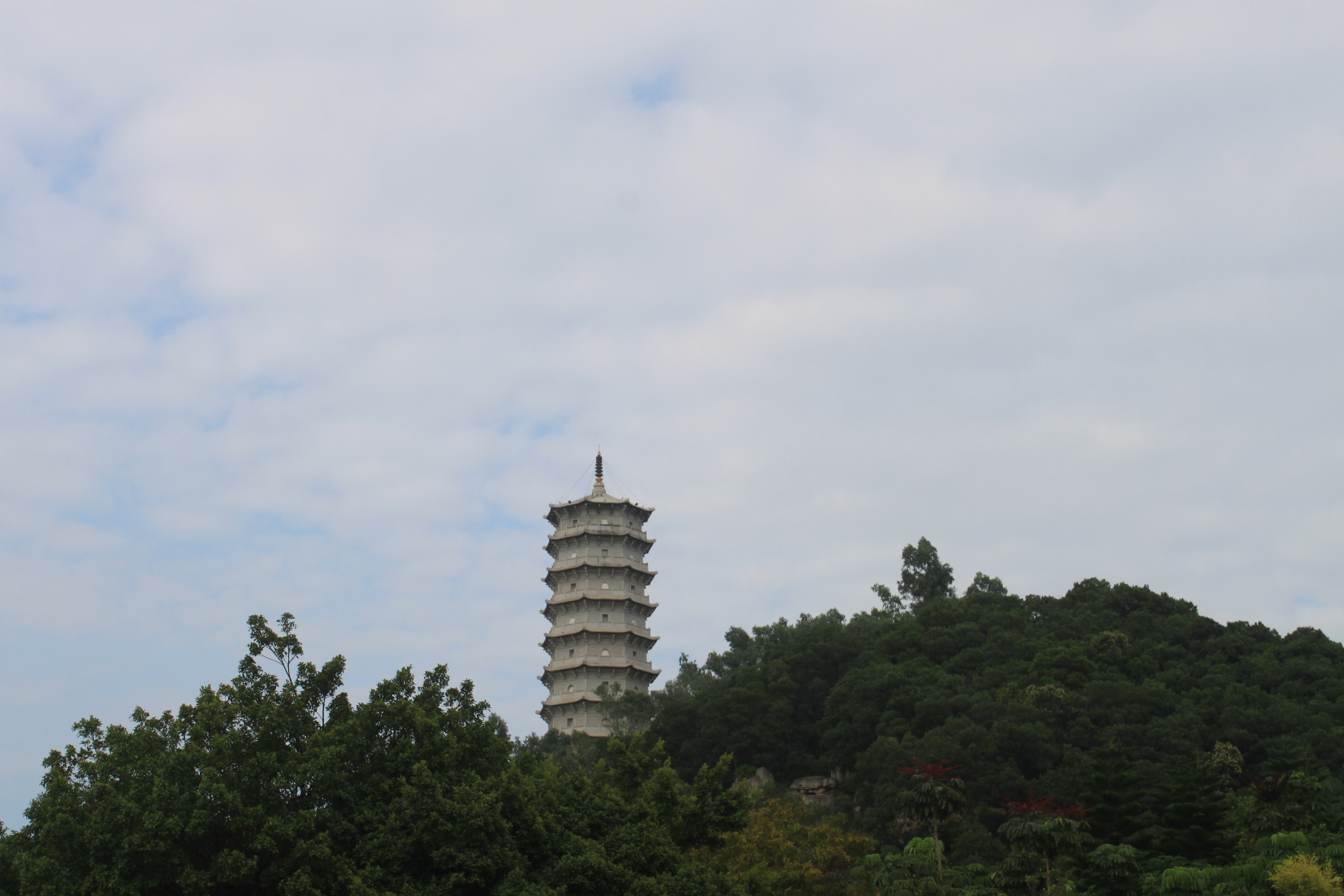
The Blessing Pagoda. The 52 m (171 ft) Blessing Pagoda has the brick and wood structure with nine stories and eight sides.

Title	Chinese title	Notes
Fuyin waterfall	福音瀑	
Blessing Pagoda	福塔	
Jufu Hill	聚福山	
Tunnel	隧道	
Lancui Lake	揽翠湖	
Soul of Martial Art	武之魂	
Nanjing Garden	昔园今景	
Ancient Shu Garden	古蜀园	
Zhuang's Folk Song Fair	壮乡歌圩	
Ancient Wu Villa	古吴山庄	
Nanyuan Garden	南苑	

=== East Area ===
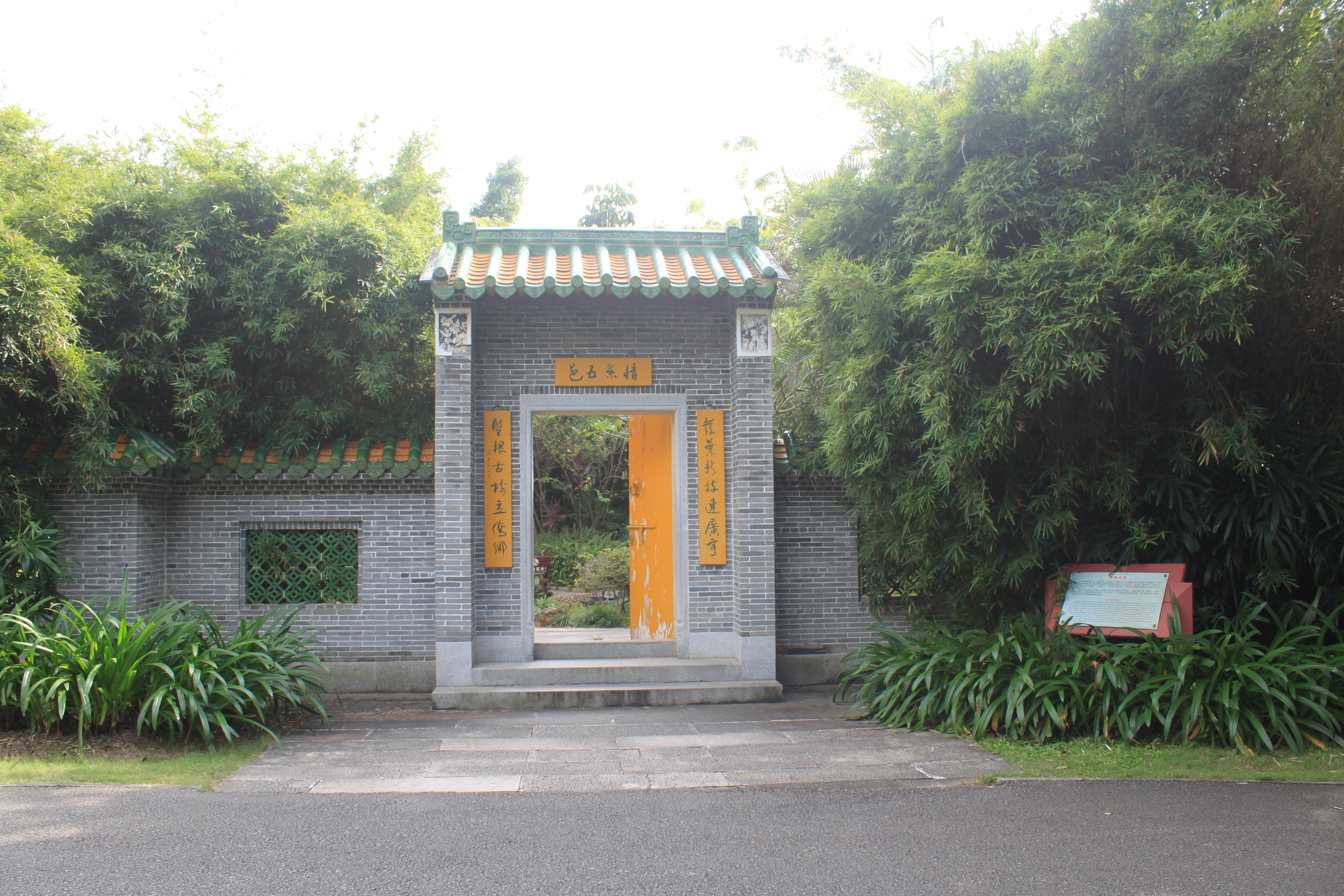
The Lovely Wuyi scenery spot.

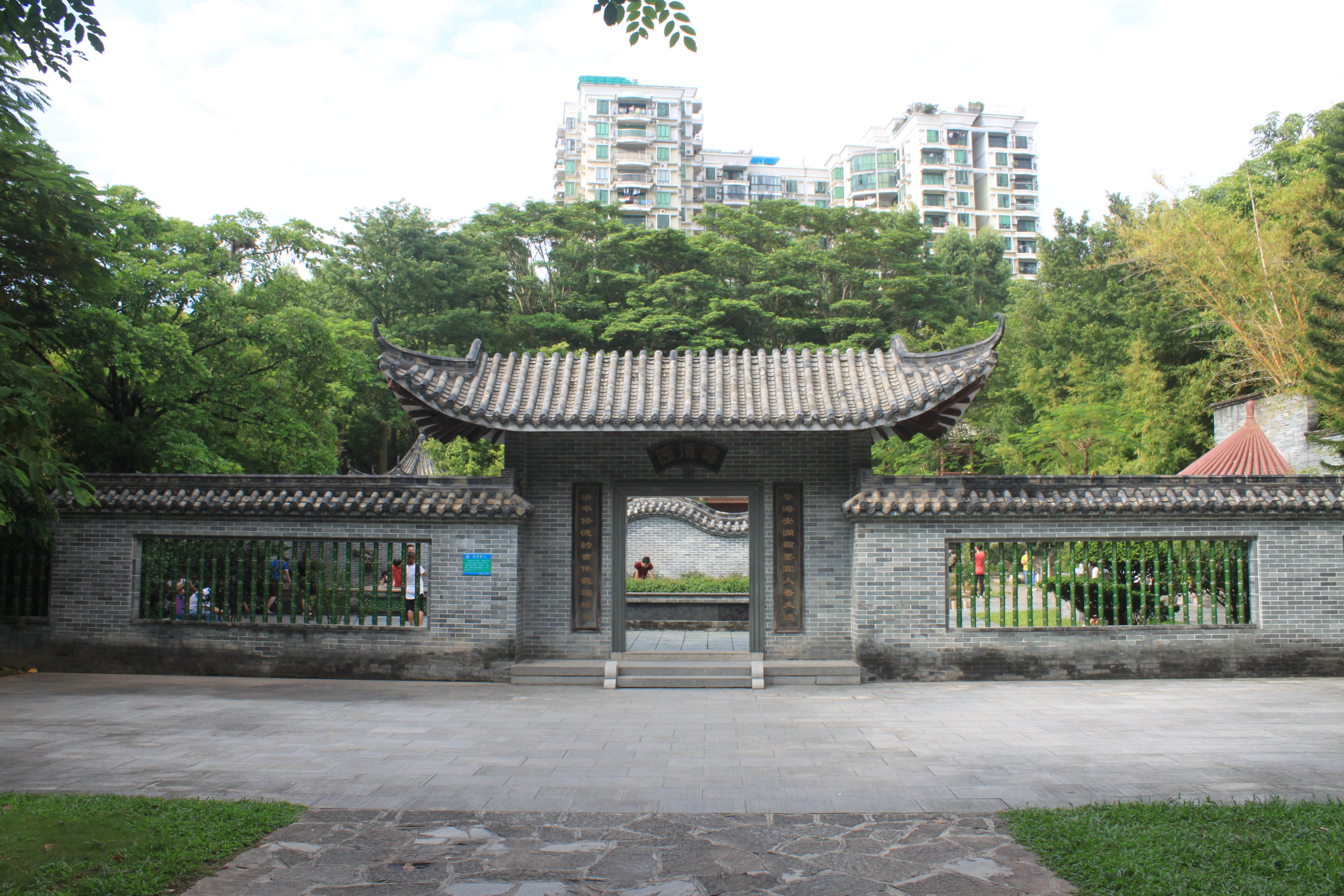
The Yueqing Garden scenery spot.

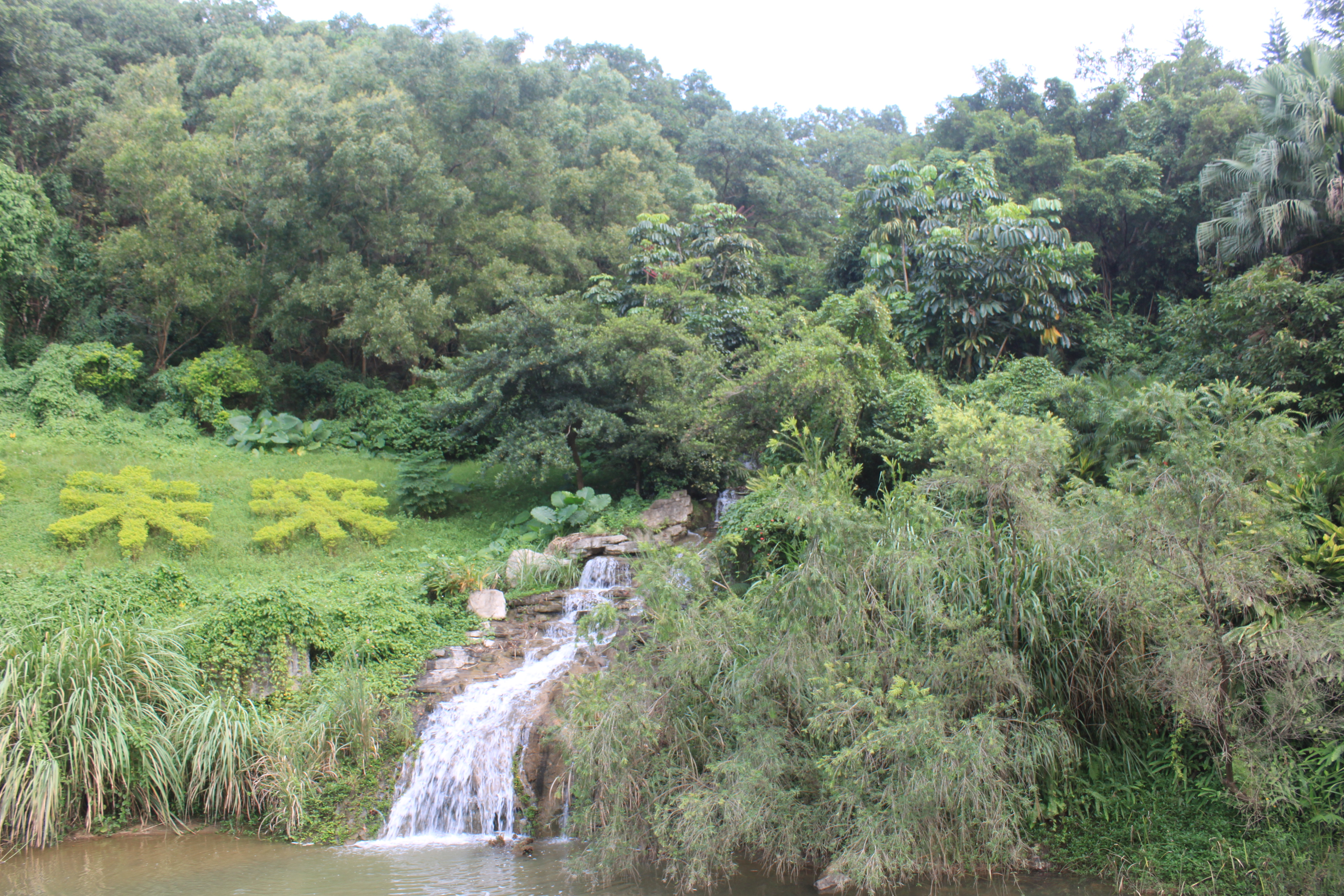
The Fuyin waterfall scenery spot.

Title	Chinese title	Notes
Charm of Wu-Style Spring	吴风泉韵	
Cangtai Garden	苍苔园	
Rhythm of Wells	井韵	
Baozhi Garden	宝芝园	
Flowing Water Garden	活水园	
Hubei Garden	湖北园	
Quanzhou House's Citong Garden	泉州馆·刺桐园	
Existing Charm of Ancient Kiln	古窑遗韵	
Huicui Lake	汇翠湖	
Huifang Garden	汇芳园	
Zhile Garden	知乐园	
Picturesque Jiangnan Garden	水墨江南园	
Jisi Garden	寄思园	
Wonderful Scenery at Baotu	趵突盛景	
Solar Power System	太阳能光伏发电系统	
East Entrance	东门	

== See also ==
- List of protected areas of China
