= Rugby sevens at the Summer World University Games =

Rugby sevens competition was part of the Universiade in 2013, and returned in 2019 as an optional sport.

== Events ==
Event	13	19
Men's team	•	•
Women's team	•	•
Events	2	2

== Medal table ==
Last updated after the 2019 Summer Universiade

Rank	Nation	Gold	Silver	Bronze	Total
1	Russia (RUS)	2	0	1	3
2	Japan (JPN)	2	0	0	2
3	France (FRA)	0	2	1	3
4	Italy (ITA)	0	1	0	1
4	South Africa (RSA)	0	1	0	1
6	Canada (CAN)	0	0	1	1
6	Great Britain (GBR)	0	0	1	1
Totals (7 entries)		4	4	4	12
