= Handball at the Summer World University Games =

The handball competition has been in the Universiade only in 2015 as an optional sport.

== Events ==
Event	15
Men's team	•
Women's team	•
Events	2

== Medal table ==
Last updated after the 2015 Summer Universiade

Rank	Nation	Gold	Silver	Bronze	Total
1	Portugal (POR)	1	0	0	1
1	Russia (RUS)	1	0	0	1
3	Serbia (SRB)	0	1	1	2
4	South Korea (KOR)	0	1	0	1
5	Switzerland (SUI)	0	0	1	1
Totals (5 entries)		2	2	2	6
