= Skeleton at the Winter World University Games =

- Events: 10 (men: 5; women: 5)

Games
- 1959; 1960; 1961; 1962; 1963; 1964; 1965; 1966; 1967; 1968; 1970; 1970; 1973; 1972; 1975; 1975; 1977; 1978; 1979; 1981; 1983; 1985; 1987; 1989; 1991; 1993; 1995; 1997; 1999; 2001; 2003; 2005; 2007; 2009; 2011; 2013; 2015; 2017; 2019; 2021; 2025

Skeleton events have been contested at the Universiade only once, in 2005 as an optional sport.

== Events ==
Event	05	Years
Men's	•	1
Women's	•	1

== Medalists ==
=== Men ===
Year	Gold	Silver	Bronze
1960-2003	not included in the program		
2005	(United States) Chris Hedquist	(United Kingdom) Adam Pengilly	(Austria) Martin Rettl
2007-2025	not included in the program		

=== Women ===
Year	Gold	Silver	Bronze
1960-2003	not included in the program		
2005	(United Kingdom) Shelley Rudman	(United Kingdom) Amy Williams	(Germany) Kerstin Jürgens
2007-2025	not included in the program		

== Medal table ==
Last updated after the 2017 Winter Universiade

Rank	Nation	Gold	Silver	Bronze	Total
1	Great Britain (GBR)	1	2	0	3
2	United States (USA)	1	0	0	1
3	Austria (AUT)	0	0	1	1
3	Germany (GER)	0	0	1	1
Totals (4 entries)		2	2	2	6
