= Synchronised swimming at the Summer World University Games =

The synchronised swimming competition has been in the Universiade only in 2013, as an optional sport.

== Events ==
Event	13
Solo	•
Duet	•
Team	•
Combined	•
Events	2

== Medal table ==
Last updated after the 2013 Summer Universiade

Rank	Nation	Gold	Silver	Bronze	Total
1	Russia (RUS)	4	0	0	4
2	Japan (JPN)	0	4	0	4
3	Italy (ITA)	0	0	2	2
4	Hungary (HUN)	0	0	1	1
4	United States (USA)	0	0	1	1
Totals (5 entries)		4	4	4	12
