= Sambo at the Summer World University Games =

Sambo competitions

Sambo competition has been held one time at the Universiade, as an optional sport during the 2013 Summer Universiade.

== Medal summary ==
=== Medal table ===
Rank	Nation	Gold	Silver	Bronze	Total
1	Russia (RUS)	12	1	3	16
2	Belarus (BLR)	2	2	2	6
3	Japan (JPN)	2	1	2	5
4	Israel (ISR)	1	1	0	2
5	Armenia (ARM)	1	0	2	3
6	Ukraine (UKR)	0	5	2	7
7	Kazakhstan (KAZ)	0	2	2	4
8	Mongolia (MGL)	0	1	4	5
9	Bulgaria (BUL)	0	1	2	3
10	Argentina (ARG)	0	1	1	2
10	Tajikistan (TJK)	0	1	1	2
12	France (FRA)	0	1	0	1
12	Georgia (GEO)	0	1	0	1
14	Azerbaijan (AZE)	0	0	3	3
14	Turkmenistan (TKM)	0	0	3	3
16	China (CHN)	0	0	1	1
16	Italy (ITA)	0	0	1	1
16	Kyrgyzstan (KGZ)	0	0	1	1
16	Lithuania (LTU)	0	0	1	1
16	Moldova (MDA)	0	0	1	1
16	Serbia (SRB)	0	0	1	1
16	Slovenia (SLO)	0	0	1	1
16	Uzbekistan (UZB)	0	0	1	1
16	Venezuela (VEN)	0	0	1	1
Totals (24 entries)		18	18	36	72
