= Wrestling at the Summer World University Games =

- Events: 21 (men: 14; women: 7)

Games
- 1959; 1960; 1961; 1962; 1963; 1964; 1965; 1966; 1967; 1968; 1970; 1970; 1973; 1972; 1975; 1975; 1977; 1978; 1979; 1981; 1983; 1985; 1987; 1989; 1991; 1993; 1995; 1997; 1999; 2001; 2003; 2005; 2007; 2009; 2011; 2013; 2015; 2017; 2019; 2021; 2025

Wrestling has been an Universiade optional sport since the 1973 edition in Moscow, USSR. After that, wrestling was an optional sport in the 1977, 1981, 2005 and 2013 editions. Currently, two styles are competed: freestyle and Greco-Roman. At the 2013 edition, belt wrestling was also part of the program.

== Editions (freestyle and Greco-Roman) ==
Games	Year	Host city	Host country	Winner	Second	Third
VII	1973	Moscow	Soviet Union	Soviet Union	United States	Romania
IX	1977	Sofia	Bulgaria	Bulgaria	Soviet Union	Romania
XI	1981	Bucharest	Romania	Soviet Union	Romania	Japan
XXIII	2005	İzmir	Turkey	Japan	Turkey	United States
XXVII	2013	Kazan	Russia	Russia	Japan	Azerbaijan

== Editions (belt) ==
Games	Year	Host city	Host country	Winner	Second	Third
XXVII	2013	Kazan	Russia	Russia	Turkmenistan	Kyrgyzstan

== Medal table ==
Last updated after the 2013 Summer Universiade

Rank	Nation	Gold	Silver	Bronze	Total
1	Soviet Union (URS)	30	16	9	55
2	Russia (RUS)	24	8	9	41
3	Japan (JPN)	14	5	6	25
4	Romania (ROM)	11	13	12	36
5	Bulgaria (BUL)	8	12	10	30
6	United States (USA)	5	6	13	24
7	Turkey (TUR)	5	5	4	14
8	Mongolia (MGL)	5	3	10	18
9	Iran (IRI)	2	9	6	17
10	Ukraine (UKR)	2	6	13	21
11	Azerbaijan (AZE)	2	4	4	10
12	Turkmenistan (TKM)	2	3	7	12
13	Canada (CAN)	2	2	5	9
14	Kyrgyzstan (KGZ)	2	1	6	9
15	Cuba (CUB)	2	0	3	5
16	Kazakhstan (KAZ)	1	2	10	13
17	Georgia (GEO)	1	0	6	7
18	North Korea (PRK)	1	0	2	3
19	Israel (ISR)	1	0	1	2
20	Armenia (ARM)	0	4	4	8
20	Yugoslavia (YUG)	0	4	4	8
22	South Korea (KOR)	0	3	7	10
23	Belarus (BLR)	0	3	5	8
24	Poland (POL)	0	3	3	6
25	Moldova (MDA)	0	2	5	7
26	Hungary (HUN)	0	2	3	5
27	Uzbekistan (UZB)	0	1	4	5
28	East Germany (GDR)	0	1	3	4
29	Tajikistan (TJK)	0	1	2	3
30	Germany (GER)	0	1	0	1
31	Estonia (EST)	0	0	1	1
31	Finland (FIN)	0	0	1	1
31	France (FRA)	0	0	1	1
31	India (IND)	0	0	1	1
31	Latvia (LAT)	0	0	1	1
31	Serbia (SRB)	0	0	1	1
Totals (36 entries)		120	120	182	422

== Current events ==
=== Men's Greco-Roman and freestyle ===
- 55 kg
- 60 kg
- 66 kg
- 84 kg
- 96 kg
- 120 kg

=== Women's ===
- 48 kg
- 51 kg
- 55 kg
- 59 kg
- 63 kg
- 67 kg
- 72 kg
