= 1987 Winter Universiade =

Multi-sport event in Štrbské Pleso, Czechoslovakia

XIII Winter Universiade XIII Zimná univerziáda
- Host city: Štrbské Pleso, Czechoslovakia
- Country: Czechoslovakia
- Opening: February 21, 1987
- Closing: February 28, 1987
- Opened by: Gustáv Husák

The 1987 Winter Universiade, the XIII Winter Universiade, took place in Štrbské Pleso, Czechoslovakia. 596 athletes from 28 countries participated at the games.

== Medal table ==
* Host nation (Czechoslovakia)

| Rank | Nation | Gold | Silver | Bronze | Total |
|---|---|---|---|---|---|
| 1 | Czechoslovakia (TCH)* | 14 | 5 | 4 | 23 |
| 2 | Soviet Union (URS) | 6 | 8 | 4 | 18 |
| 3 | Austria (AUT) | 1 | 2 | 0 | 3 |
| 4 | Bulgaria (BUL) | 1 | 1 | 0 | 2 |
| 5 | United States (USA) | 0 | 1 | 5 | 6 |
| 5 | Yugoslavia (YUG) | 0 | 1 | 5 | 6 |
| 7 | East Germany (GDR) | 0 | 1 | 1 | 2 |
| 7 | Japan (JPN) | 0 | 1 | 1 | 2 |
| 7 | Switzerland (SUI) | 0 | 1 | 1 | 2 |
| 10 | Italy (ITA) | 0 | 1 | 0 | 1 |
| 11 | Canada (CAN) | 0 | 0 | 1 | 1 |
| 11 | Poland (POL) | 0 | 0 | 1 | 1 |
| Totals (12 entries) | | 22 | 22 | 23 | 67 |

=== Sports ===
- Alpine skiing (10)
- Cross-country skiing (6)
- Figure skating (4)
- Ice hockey (1)
- Nordic combined (1)
- Ski jumping (2)
