= Beach volleyball at the 2013 Summer Universiade =

Beach volleyball at the XXVII Summer Universiade
- Venue: Kazanka Beach Volleyball Centre
- Dates: July 8, 2013 – July 13, 2013

Beach volleyball was contested at the 2013 Summer Universiade from July 8 to 13 at the Kazanka Beach Volleyball Centre in Kazan, Russia.

== Medal summary ==
=== Medal table ===
| Rank | Nation | Gold | Silver | Bronze | Total |
|---|---|---|---|---|---|
| 1 | Poland (POL) | 1 | 1 | 0 | 2 |
| 2 | Russia (RUS)* | 1 | 0 | 1 | 2 |
| 3 | Germany (GER) | 0 | 1 | 1 | 2 |
| Totals (3 entries) | | 2 | 2 | 2 | 6 |

=== Medal events ===
| Event | Gold | Silver | Bronze |
|---|---|---|---|
| Men | Poland (POL); Michał Kądzioła; Jakub Szałankiewicz | Germany (GER); Armin Dollinger; Jonas Schröder | Russia (RUS); Yaroslav Koshkarev; Konstantin Semenov |
| Women | Russia (RUS); Ekaterina Khomyakova; Evgenia Ukolova | Poland (POL); Kinga Kołosińska; Monika Brzostek | Germany (GER); Julia Sude; Chantal Laboureur |
