= Changchun World Sculpture Park =

Sculpture park in Changchun, China

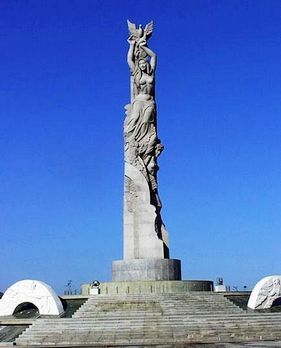
Changchun World Sculpture Park tower

Changchun World Sculpture Park is located in Changchun, Jilin, China. It is a collection of Eastern and Western art and sculpture set in a natural landscape and run as a theme park. It was named a national 5A-class tourist attraction.

Changchun World Sculpture Park was founded in 2001, and officially opened in September 2003. The park covers an area of 92 hectares (230 acres), including 11 hectares (27 acres) of lakes. The park features a combination of natural landscapes and cultural landscapes. With the theme of "friendship, peace and spring", the park combines Eastern and Western cultures and arts with unique charm and style.

The sculpture tower, which embodies the theme of "friendship, peace and spring", was co-authored by the famous domestic sculpture masters Ye Shan, Pan He, Cheng Yun Xian, Wang Keqing and Cao Chunsheng. A tower, 29.5 meters (97 ft) high, composed of young girls, flowers and dove of peace surrounded by reflect the five continents five groups of cast bronze statues and white marble relief, modeling exquisite, spectacular spectacular, won the Third National City Sculpture Construction Achievement Exhibition outstanding works prize.

Located in the garden is the Changchun Sculpture Museum building which has an area of 12,500 square meters. The museum features a special exhibition area, now possession of hundreds of magical African horse Conde wood carvings and a large number of Chinese and foreign famous sculptor sculpture quality.

Changchun World Sculpture Park has a large number of works of art, a wide range of artistic styles. It has more than 340 sculptures from more than 130 countries and over 300 sculptors. There is a masterpiece that reflects Ma'anshan culture, Eskimos culture and Māori culture, as well as the emblems of Indo-European culture, African culture, Latin American culture and oriental culture, which fully reflect the national, ethnic and geographical features and are rich in materials and different in style.

== Scenic spot layout ==
Changchun Sculpture Art Museum, with a construction area of 12,500 square meters, is built on a slope and has a unique shape. It was opened to the public in 2003. The museum is equipped with exhibition halls, lecture halls, multi-functional halls, conference rooms, creative rooms, etc., which can meet the multi-level needs of exhibitions, exchanges, creation, teaching, etc., and is also an excellent venue for various activities. The pavilions in the museum, "Peng Zushu Art Museum", "3D Art Experience Pavilion" and the Sculpture Garden (Pavilion) International Alliance Pavilion, etc., each have their own characteristics and are exciting.

Songshan Hanrong African Art Collection Museum, with a construction area of 5,640 square meters, was designed by Mr. He Jingtang, an academician of the Chinese Academy of Engineering and a famous architect. It opened on September 1, 2011. It currently has "Art Africa", "Charming Africa" and "Black Africa" Three major exhibition halls. The museum collects 8,491 sculptures, paintings and other artistic works from African countries such as Tanzania, Malawi and Zambia. It more completely records the modern art process in East Africa in the past 50 years and is a collection of African Makonde wood carving art in my country. It is also the museum with the largest collection of Makonde wood carvings, the most complete variety and the highest artistic level in my country. Makonde wood carving embodies the mysterious uniqueness and occupies a place in the palace of modern art with its brilliant artistic achievements. With its simple and concise style, rich imagination and strong expressive power, it has attracted more and more attention and love from the world.

Wei Xiaoming Art Museum is located in the northwest corner of the park and was completed and opened in the autumn of 2016. Its construction area is about 3,500 square meters, consisting of a sculpture exhibition hall, a painting manuscript exhibition room, an artist studio, a sun room, an art salon and an outdoor sculpture garden. This museum permanently displays 232 sculptures by the sculptor Wei Xiaoming, and 178 prints, illustrations, watercolors, sketches, oil paintings and design manuscripts. It covers almost all of Wei Xiaoming's art works since the 1980s, and will continue to collect them. All works by Wei Xiaoming. Wei Xiaoming is a famous sculptor and printmaker in my country, a professor at the Academy of Fine Arts of Tsinghua University, and the vice chairman of the Beijing Artists Association. He studied at the Academy of Fine Arts in Vienna, Austria, and won the "Outstanding Art Contribution Award" awarded by the Austrian National Ministry of Culture and Research. His works are very popular in the current art auction market.

Changchun Sculpture Museum is located in the southeast corner of the park. It is currently the largest sculpture museum in China, with a construction area of 18,000 square meters. It was designed by Cheng Taining, an academician of the Chinese Academy of Engineering and a famous architect. In accordance with the design concept of "traveling through the sky and latitude, carving time", the overall building is like a boulder breaking out of the earth, strong and heavy. As an important base for Changchun to communicate the world's sculpture culture, the Changchun Sculpture Museum integrates sculpture collection, exhibition display, exchange research, teaching and creation and other functions, providing a rich carrier for improving citizens' cultural accomplishment, disseminating knowledge, and cultivating temperament. At present, the museum contains the "Culture·City - Documentary of Changchun Urban Sculpture Construction" achievement exhibition, "Spring and Autumn Fruits" Cao Chunsheng Sculpture Art Museum, Wang Keqing Art Museum, Greek Sculpture Art Museum and other collections.

The Sculpture Experience Hall is located in the middle of the park, with a construction area of 492.9 square meters and an area of more than 2,000 square meters. It is the functional facility supporting center of the park. The professional-grade 1,600-cubic-meter sand sculpture field, 160-square-meter ceramics hall and specialty food court make this the most popular place in the scenic spot in summer.

== Classic works ==
- Cheng Yun-Xian's "Iron Horse Jin Ge"
- Chen Yun Gang's "Big East to go"
- French sculptor Rodin's "The Thinker"
- German sculptor Maisiya Si "safe"
- African Macond wood carving
- "fly"
- "Observer"
- "Nile"
- "Spring Love"
- "Sea Flowers"
- "Pangu"
