= Canoeing at the Summer World University Games =

Canoeing competition

- Events: 24 (men: 18; women: 6)

Games
- 1959; 1960; 1961; 1962; 1963; 1964; 1965; 1966; 1967; 1968; 1970; 1970; 1973; 1972; 1975; 1975; 1977; 1978; 1979; 1981; 1983; 1985; 1987; 1989; 1991; 1993; 1995; 1997; 1999; 2001; 2003; 2005; 2007; 2009; 2011; 2013; 2015; 2017; 2019; 2021; 2025

Canoeing has been an optional sport at the Universiade since 1987 in Zagreb, Yugoslavia. After this, canoeing was an optional sport only at the 2013 Summer Universiade in Kazan, Russian Federation.

== Editions ==
Games	Year	Host city	Best nation
XIV	1987	Zagreb, Yugoslavia	Romania
XXVII	2013	Kazan, Russia	Russia

== Medal table ==
Last updated after the 2013 Summer Universiade

Rank	Nation	Gold	Silver	Bronze	Total
1	Russia (RUS)	10	6	5	21
2	Belarus (BLR)	6	4	4	14
3	Romania (ROM)	5	4	4	13
4	Poland (POL)	3	4	10	17
5	Lithuania (LTU)	3	0	0	3
6	Soviet Union (URS)	2	5	1	8
7	Hungary (HUN)	2	0	5	7
8	Portugal (POR)	2	0	0	2
9	Germany (GER)	1	2	0	3
9	Ukraine (UKR)	1	2	0	3
11	Norway (NOR)	1	0	0	1
11	United States (USA)	1	0	0	1
13	Czech Republic (CZE)	0	3	1	4
14	Italy (ITA)	0	2	0	2
14	Kazakhstan (KAZ)	0	2	0	2
16	Serbia (SRB)	0	1	3	4
17	Canada (CAN)	0	1	1	2
18	Slovakia (SVK)	0	1	0	1
19	Bulgaria (BUL)	0	0	1	1
19	Spain (ESP)	0	0	1	1
19	Uzbekistan (UZB)	0	0	1	1
19	Yugoslavia (YUG)	0	0	1	1
Totals (22 entries)		37	37	38	112
