= Soviet Union at the Universiade =

- IOC code: URS
- Medals Ranked 5th: Gold 522 Silver 433 Bronze 320 Total 1,275

The Soviet Union participated in 14 games of the Universiade, from the 1959 Summer Universiade to the 1991 Summer Universiade, the last edition before the dissolution of the Soviet Union in 1991.

== Medal count ==
=== Summer Universiade ===
Soviet Union won 988 medals at the Summer Universiade and are at the 3rd rank in the all-time Summer Universiade medal table.

Host nation

Edition				
(Italy) Turin 1959	11	8	5	24
(Bulgaria) Sofia 1961	21	23	7	51
(Brazil) Porto Alegre 1963	18	12	3	32
(Hungary) Budapest 1965	14	26	15	55
(Japan) Tokyo 1967	did not participate			
(Italy) Turin 1970	26	17	15	58
(Soviet Union) Moscow 1973	69	35	31	135
(Italy) Rome 1975	7	5	11	23
(Bulgaria) Sofia 1977	26	31	25	82
Mexico City 1979	33	29	14	76
(Romania) Bucharest 1981	38	38	36	112
(Canada) Edmonton 1983	57	30	25	112
(Japan) Kobe 1985	41	22	17	80
(Socialist Federal Republic of Yugoslavia) Zagreb 1987	23	34	19	76
(West Germany) Duisburg 1989	9	11	8	28
(United Kingdom) Sheffield 1991	16	14	19	49
Total	409	335	250	993

== See also ==
- Soviet Union at the Olympics
- Soviet Union at the Paralympics
