= Roller sports at the Summer World University Games =

Roller sports competition

- Events: 16 (men: 8; women: 8)

Games
- 1959; 1960; 1961; 1962; 1963; 1964; 1965; 1966; 1967; 1968; 1970; 1970; 1973; 1972; 1975; 1975; 1977; 1978; 1979; 1981; 1983; 1985; 1987; 1989; 1991; 1993; 1995; 1997; 1999; 2001; 2003; 2005; 2007; 2009; 2011; 2013; 2015; 2017; 2019; 2021; 2025

Roller sports was only contested at the 2017 Summer Universiade in Taipei, Taiwan.

== Events ==
Event	17	Years
Men's 300 metres time trial	•	1
Men's 500 metres sprint	•	1
Men's 1000 metres sprint	•	1
Men's 10,000 metres elimination races	•	1
Men's 15,000 metres elimination races	•	1
Men's 3000 metres relay	•	1
Men's marathon	•	1
Men's speed slalom	•	1
Women's 300 metres time trial	•	1
Women's 500 metres sprint	•	1
Women's 1000 metres sprint	•	1
Women's 10,000 metres elimination races	•	1
Women's 15,000 metres elimination races	•	1
Women's 3000 metres relay	•	1
Women's marathon	•	1
Women's speed slalom	•	1

== Medal table ==
Rank	Nation	Gold	Silver	Bronze	Total
1	Chinese Taipei (TPE)	10	11	2	23
2	South Korea (KOR)	4	2	5	11
3	Colombia (COL)	1	3	7	11
4	China (CHN)	1	0	0	1
5	Italy (ITA)	0	0	1	1
5	Russia (RUS)	0	0	1	1
Totals (6 entries)		16	16	16	48
