= Belt wrestling at the Summer World University Games =

Belt wrestling competition

- Events: 19 (men: 14; women: 5)

Games
- 1959; 1960; 1961; 1962; 1963; 1964; 1965; 1966; 1967; 1968; 1970; 1970; 1973; 1972; 1975; 1975; 1977; 1978; 1979; 1981; 1983; 1985; 1987; 1989; 1991; 1993; 1995; 1997; 1999; 2001; 2003; 2005; 2007; 2009; 2011; 2013; 2015; 2017; 2019; 2021; 2025

Belt wrestling was only contested at the 2013 Summer Universiade in Kazan, Russia.

== Events ==
Event	13	Years
Men's classic style 60 kg	•	1
Men's classic style 70 kg	•	1
Men's classic style 80 kg	•	1
Men's classic style 90 kg	•	1
Men's classic style 100 kg	•	1
Men's classic style +100 kg	•	1
Men's classic style absolute	•	1
Men's freestyle 62 kg	•	1
Men's freestyle 68 kg	•	1
Men's freestyle 75 kg	•	1
Men's freestyle 82 kg	•	1
Men's freestyle 90 kg	•	1
Men's freestyle 100 kg	•	1
Men's freestyle +100 kg	•	1
Women's freestyle 52 kg	•	1
Women's freestyle 58 kg	•	1
Women's freestyle 66 kg	•	1
Women's freestyle 76 kg	•	1
Women's freestyle +76 kg	•	1

== Medal table ==
Rank	Nation	Gold	Silver	Bronze	Total
1	Russia (RUS)	12	3	4	19
2	Turkmenistan (TKM)	2	3	7	12
3	Kyrgyzstan (KGZ)	2	1	6	9
4	Mongolia (MGL)	1	1	4	6
5	Japan (JPN)	1	1	0	2
6	Israel (ISR)	1	0	1	2
7	Ukraine (UKR)	0	2	4	6
8	Kazakhstan (KAZ)	0	2	2	4
9	Belarus (BLR)	0	2	0	2
10	Moldova (MDA)	0	1	4	5
11	Uzbekistan (UZB)	0	1	3	4
12	Tajikistan (TJK)	0	1	2	3
13	Azerbaijan (AZE)	0	1	0	1
14	Latvia (LAT)	0	0	1	1
Totals (14 entries)		19	19	38	76
