= 2027 Winter World University Games =

Multi-sport event in Changchun, China

2027 Winter World University Games 2027年国际大学生体育联合会冬季世界大学生运动会
- Host city: Changchun, China
- Motto: Dreams Ignited, Youth United (Chinese: 逐梦冰雪, 长驻青春)
- Events: 97 in 12 sports
- Opening: 15 January 2027
- Closing: 25 January 2027
- Main venue: Changchun Wuhuan Gymnasium
- Website: https://changchun2027.fisu.net/

The 2027 FISU Winter World University Games, also known as the 33rd Winter Universiade, (Note: The former name of the event, Universiade, is being used by the organising committee for these Games.) is an upcoming winter multi-sport event for student and youth athletes, scheduled from 15 to 25 January 2027 in Changchun, Jilin, China, with some events also held in Jilin City. This will be the second time that the event will be held in China, after Harbin in 2009.

== Bidding process ==
The following cities and regions had all expressed an interest in hosting either the 2027 and 2029 Winter World University Games.

- Harbin, China
- Erzurum, Turkey
- Stockholm-Åre-Östersund, Sweden
- French Alps, France
- Almaty, Kazakhstan
- Lillehammer, Norway
- Štrbské Pleso, Slovakia
- Zakopane, Poland

On 12 November 2025, during a meeting of the FISU Executive Committee, it was announced that the organization had received only one formal bid project proposed by China Student Sports Federation to host the 2027 FISU World Winter University Games. It was not revealed which province or city was interested at that time, but rumors suggested it was Changchun, Beijing, or Harbin. Some days later, it was confirmed that the proposal came from Jilin province. At that meeting, the Executive Committee also authorized the FISU Steering Committee to proceed with the technical evaluation of the application. FISU did not disclose, at that time, any other formally submitted applications for the event, although there had been preliminary expressions of interest from other cities months earlier. Following the evaluation visit and authorized procedure, the Steering Committee confirmed the awarding of the 2027 edition to the city of Changchun on November 26, 2025.

== Development and preparations ==
=== Venues ===
==== Changchun ====
Venue	Events	Capacity
Changchun Wuhuan Gymnasium	Ceremonies	10,488
Changchun Wuhuan Gymnasium	Figure skating	10,488
Changchun Wuhuan Gymnasium	Short track speed skating	10,488
Nanguan Ice Arena	Ice hockey (women's preliminaries and classification, men's classification)	2,460
Jilin Speed Skating Oval	Speed skating	2,146
Changchun Ice Arena	Curling	225
Changchun Olympic Park Ice Arena	Ice hockey (men's preliminaries, men's and women's finals)	8,552
Jingyuetan Ski Resort	Cross-country skiing and ski orienteering	TBA
Lianhua Mountain Ski Resort	Freestyle skiing (aerials)	TBA
Changchun World Sculpture Park	Cross-country running	TBA

==== Jilin ====
Venue	Events	Capacity
Beidahu	Alpine skiing	TBA
Beidahu	Freestyle skiing (slopestyle, big air and half-pipe)	TBA
Beidahu	Snowboarding	TBA
Songhua Lake Ski Resort	Snowboarding	TBA
Songhua Lake Ski Resort	Ski mountaineering	TBA

=== Promotion ===
On 15 January 2026, at 18:00, a one-year countdown event was held during the Changchun Siji Nanhe 'Powder Snow' Carnival.

On 21 March 2026, a 300-day countdown event was held at Xinmin Avenue. The emblem, slogan and mascots were revealed at this event.

=== Volunteers ===
On February 28, 2026, the volunteer recruitment for the Games was officially launched. It is expected that 8,000 volunteers will participate in providing service and support for the Games.

== The Games ==
=== Sports ===
A total of 97 medal events in 12 sports are scheduled for the Games, featuring the ten compulsory sports alongside three optional sports. The current compulsory sports of the Winter World University Games consist of nine disciplines: alpine skiing (including para alpine skiing), cross-country skiing (including para cross-country skiing), curling, figure skating, freestyle skiing, ice hockey, short track speed skating and snowboarding. This will be the first edition in which ski orienteering will be part of the compulsory program, after being an optional sport in the previous two editions. Furthermore, speed skating will return as an optional sport for the first time since 2023, and cross-country running will make its debut.

- Alpine skiing (17)
- Cross-country running (5)
- Cross-country skiing (17)
- Curling (3)
- Figure skating (4)
- Freestyle skiing (9)
- Ice hockey (2)
- Short track speed skating (9)
- Snowboarding (10)
- Ski orienteering (7)
- Ski mountaineering (7)
- Speed skating (15)

==== Biathlon relocation ====
Originally, biathlon was scheduled to be held in Changchun, but in April 2026, the local organising committee requested to FISU the removal of the sport due to environmental and logistical reasons. After several months of negotiation, on 5 November 2026, FISU announced a separate World University Championship for biathlon that would be held in Osrblie, Slovakia from 3 to 7 February 2027. Osrblie previously hosted the sport in 1999, and in 2015 after that year's hosts, Granada, Spain, ended up withdrawing the Nordic skiing events for similar reasons.

== Marketing ==
=== Emblem ===
The emblem of this Winter Universiade was created by a design team from the Jilin University of Arts. The design was led by the core members of the team responsible for 'Shuey Rhon Rhon,' the mascot of the 2022 Winter Paralympics. The group has also developed the visual identities and torch designs for the 2025 World Games, the 2025 Asian Winter Games, and recent editions of the National Winter Games of China, among other major national sporting events. The emblem is officially titled 'Chun Chang' (Eternal Spring). The design is based on the Chinese calligraphy 'Cursive Script' (Caoshu) for the character 'Chang' (长), seamlessly integrated with the 'U' element, as mandated by FISU. This composition reflects the regional characteristics of Changchun while conveying the sense of speed and the youthful vitality of ice and snow sports. The design also incorporates visual elements representative of the city’s identity, such as the rhythm of filmstrips (honouring Changchun's cinematic heritage) and the trajectories of winter sports. The overall silhouette forms an upturned smiling face, with a primary color palette of blue and white, accented by various vibrant colors to highlight the ice and snow theme and the spirit of youth. Semantically, the name 'Chun Chang' echoes the city's name ('Changchun') while symbolizing the hope for world peace and long-lasting prosperity."

=== Mascots ===
"The mascots for this Winter Universiade are 'Ji Bing' and 'Ji Xue'.

'Ji Bing' is a Sika deer, whose antlers symbolise vitality and energy. The character wears blue and white attire to reflect an open and inclusive attitude, complemented by red elements that echo the historical and cultural traditions of Jilin. A snowflake pattern is incorporated to express the competitive nature of ice and snow sports.

'Ji Xue' features ginseng as its design core. Its clothing incorporates elements of Northeast China's traditional floral fabrics, showcasing the local lifestyle and folk customs. The blue and green scarf symbolises the Songhua River system, reflecting regional characteristics and a vision of development. Both mascots are presented as athletes, aiming to convey the vitality and enthusiasm of winter sports."

=== Slogan ===
"The thematic slogan for this Winter Universiade is 'Dreams Ignited, Youth United'. The slogan aims to reflect Changchun's identity as both a 'City of Ice and Snow' and a 'Youthful City,' while providing a comprehensive expression of the event's atmosphere and core values."
