= 1993 Winter Universiade =

Multi-sport event in Zakopane, Poland

XVI Winter Universiade XVI Zimowa Uniwersjada
- Host city: Zakopane, Poland
- Events: 6 sports
- Opening: February 6, 1993
- Closing: February 14, 1993
- Opened by: Lech Wałęsa
- Main venue: Wielka Krokiew

The 1993 Winter Universiade, the XVI Winter Universiade, took place in Zakopane, Poland. Japan led the medal standings with 6 gold, 5 silver and 4 bronze medals.

* Host nation (Poland)

Rank	Nation	Gold	Silver	Bronze	Total
1	Japan (JPN)	6	6	5	17
2	Russia (RUS)	6	3	5	14
3	China (CHN)	6	2	4	12
4	United States (USA)	5	4	6	15
5	South Korea (KOR)	5	3	3	11
6	Switzerland (SUI)	3	0	0	3
7	France (FRA)	2	2	0	4
8	Slovakia (SVK)	2	0	1	3
9	Italy (ITA)	1	6	2	9
10	Belarus (BLR)	1	1	1	3
10	Germany (GER)	1	1	1	3
12	Czech Republic (CZE)	1	0	0	1
12	Ukraine (UKR)	1	0	0	1
14	North Korea (PRK)	0	4	3	7
15	Poland (POL)*	0	4	1	5
16	Austria (AUT)	0	2	6	8
17	Kazakhstan (KAZ)	0	1	0	1
17	Lithuania (LTU)	0	1	0	1
19	Finland (FIN)	0	0	2	2
Totals (19 entries)		40	40	40	120

== Sports ==
- Alpine skiing (8)
- Biathlon (4)
- Cross-country skiing (6)
- Figure skating (4)
- Ice hockey (1)
- Nordic combined (1)
- Short track speed skating (10)
- Ski jumping (3)
