= 2029 Summer World University Games =

Multi-sport event in North Carolina, US

2029 FISU Summer World University Games
- Host city: Research Triangle, North Carolina, United States
- Motto: Many Teams, One Dream
- Sport: 222 in 18 sports
- Opening: 11 July 2029
- Closing: 22 July 2029
- Main venue: Carter-Finley Stadium (Opening ceremony); Kenan Stadium (Closing ceremony)
- Website: ncusa2029wug.com

The 2029 FISU Summer World University Games, also known as North Carolina 2029, is a multi-sport event scheduled from 11 to 22 July 2029 in North Carolina, United States. The bid was confirmed as the host region for the games on 10 January 2023 during the 2023 Winter World University Games held in Lake Placid, New York. This will be the second time in the history that the event will be held in United States after the 1993 Summer Universiade held in Buffalo.

== Bidding process ==
North Carolina was the only candidate in the running to host the 2029 edition. North Carolina was selected on 10 January 2023 at the FISU executive board in Lake Placid, New York, United States.

== Venues ==
The following event venues have been announced through the official Instagram account and newsroom for the event.

=== Cary Cluster ===
Venue	Sports	Capacity
Cary Tennis Park	Tennis	TBA
Triangle Aquatic Center	Water polo (preliminaries)	1,000
USA Baseball National Training Complex	Baseball (preliminaries)	1,754
WakeMed Soccer Park	Rugby sevens	10,000

=== Chapel Hill cluster ===
Venue	Sports	Capacity
Boshamer Stadium	Baseball (preliminaries)	4,100
Carmichael Arena	Volleyball (preliminaries)	6,822
Dean Smith Center	Volleyball (finals)	21,750
Kenan Stadium	Closing Ceremony	50,500
Anderson Stadium	Softball	TBA

=== Durham venues ===
Venue	Sports	Capacity
Cameron Indoor Stadium	Basketball (preliminaries)	9,314
Duke University Softball Stadium	Softball	TBA
Durham Bulls Athletic Park	Baseball (finals)	10,000
McDougald–McLendon Arena	Basketball (preliminaries)	3,500

=== Greensboro venues ===
Venue	Sports	Capacity
Greensboro Aquatic Center	Swimming	2,500
Greensboro Aquatic Center	Diving	2,500
Greensboro Aquatic Center	Water polo (finals)	2,500
First Horizon Coliseum	Artistic Gymnastics	22,000
First Horizon Coliseum	Rhythmic Gymnastics	22,000
Truist Stadium	Athletics	21,500
Special Events Center	Taekwondo	TBA

=== Raleigh cluster ===
Venue	Sports	Capacity
Wake Technical North Campus Gym	Basketball (preliminaries)	TBA
Lenovo Center	Basketball (finals)	19,500
Raleigh Convention Center	Fencing	TBA
Raleigh Convention Center	Judo	TBA
Raleigh Convention Center	Table Tennis	TBA
Reynolds Coliseum	Basketball (preliminaries)	5,500
WRAL Soccer Center	Archery	TBA
Carter-Finley Stadium	Opening Ceremony	56,919
Swing Racquet & Paddle	Tennis	TBA
Halifax Mall	Archery	TBA

=== Other Venues ===
Venue	Location	Sports	Capacity
Lawrence Joel Veterans Memorial Coliseum	Winston-Salem	Badminton	14,665
Qubein Center	High Point	Volleyball (preliminaries)	4,500
Schar Center	Elon	Volleyball (preliminaries)	5,100

== Sports ==
- Aquatics
  - Diving (13)
  - Swimming (42)
  - Water polo (2)
- Archery (10)
- Athletics (51)
- Badminton (6)
- Baseball (1)
- Basketball (2)
  - Wheelchair 3x3 basketball (2)
- Fencing (12)
- Gymnastics
  - Artistic gymnastics (14)
  - Rhythmic gymnastics (8)
- Judo (15)
- Rugby sevens (2)
- Softball (1)
- Table tennis (7)
- Taekwondo (23)
- Tennis (7)
- Volleyball (2)
