= 2027 Summer World University Games =

Multi-sport event in Chungcheong Province, South Korea

2027 FISU Summer World University Games 2027년 FISU 하계 세계 대학 경기 대회
- Host city: Chungcheong Province, South Korea
- Motto: Mega Challenge. Mega Change. (Korean: 끝없는 도전, 위대한 변화)
- Sport: 248 in 18 sports
- Opening: 1 August 2027
- Closing: 12 August 2027
- Main venue: Daejeon World Cup Stadium (opening ceremony); Sejong Central Park (closing ceremony)
- Website: chungcheong2027.com/en

The 2027 FISU Summer World University Games, also known as Chungcheong 2027, is a multi-sport event scheduled from 1 to 12 August 2027 in the cities of the historical Chungcheong Province, South Korea. The region was confirmed as the host for the Games on 12 November 2022. This will be the third time that the event will be held in South Korea, after Daegu in 2003 and Gwangju in 2015.

== Bidding process ==
Chungcheong Region (South Korea) and North Carolina (United States) were the candidates in the running to host the 2027 edition. Chungcheong was selected on 12 November 2022 at the FISU executive committee in Brussels, Belgium, while North Carolina was awarded the 2029 edition.

== Development and preparations ==
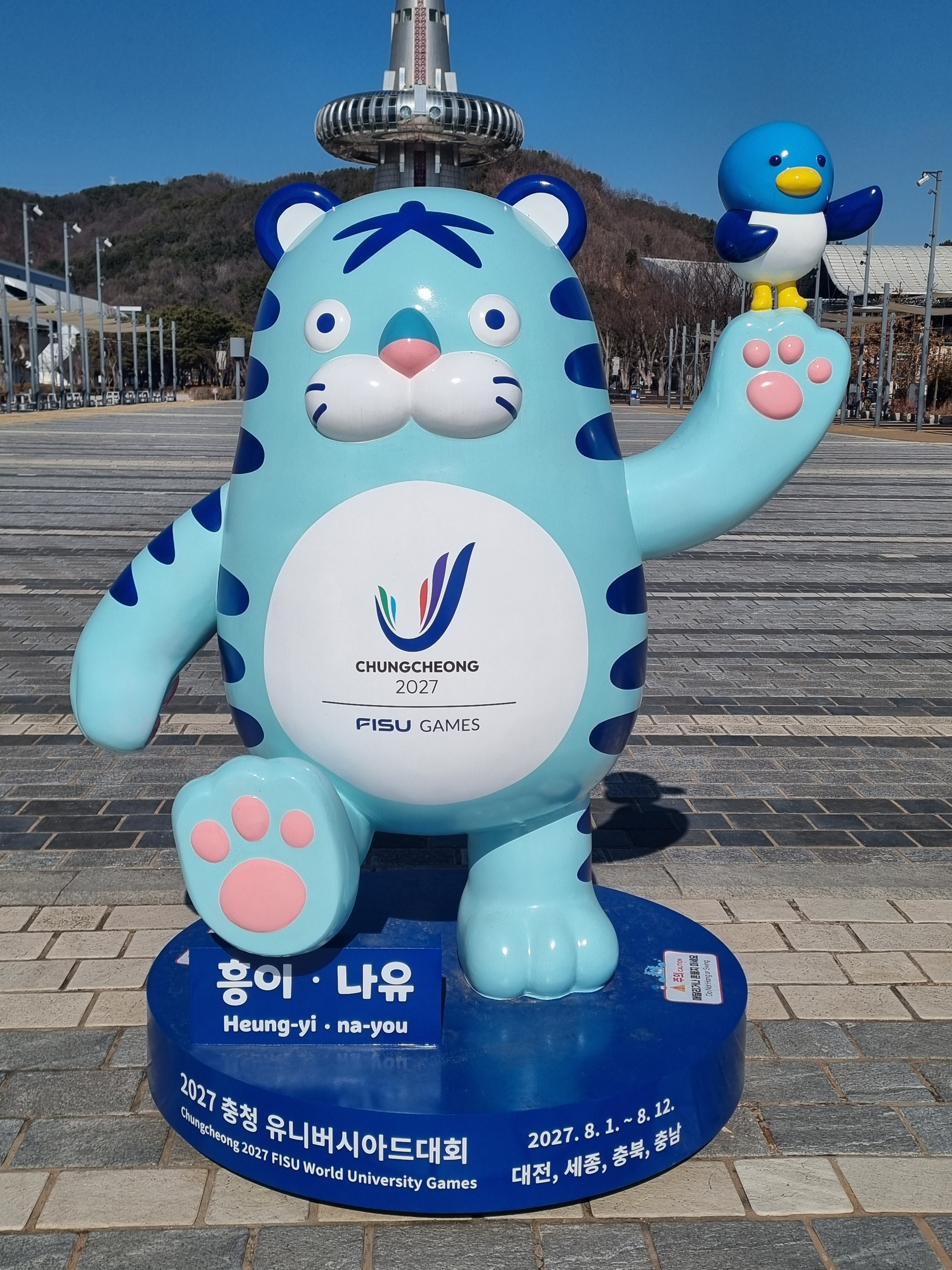
2027 Games mascots Heung-yi and Na-you taken in Expo Science Park.

=== Venues ===
31 venues will be used, spread across the cities of Daejeon, Sejong City, and the provinces of North Chungcheong and South Chungcheong.

==== Daejeon ====
Venue	Events	Capacity	Status
Daejeon World Cup Stadium	Opening ceremony	40,535	Existing
Daejeon Yongun International Aquatics Center	Aquatics (swimming, diving)	3,003	Existing
Daejeon Convention Center	Fencing	TBA	Existing

==== Sejong City ====
Venue	Events	Capacity	Status
Sejong Central Park	Closing ceremony	TBA	Existing
Sejong Sports Complex Gymnasium	Table tennis	4,000	New
Sejong Sports Complex Pool	Aquatics (water polo)	3,000	New
Sejong Citizens' Gymnasium	Judo	TBA	Existing

==== North Chungcheong Province ====
City	Venue	Events	Capacity	Status
Cheongju	Cheongju Multipurpose Indoor Gymnasium	Gymnastics (artistic, rhythmic)	6,000	New
Cheongju	Cheongju Gymnasium	Basketball	4,180	Existing
Cheongju	Ochang Industrial Complex Gymnasium	Basketball	TBA	New
Cheongju	Olympic Memorial National Living Center	Basketball	TBA	Existing
Cheongju	Kim Soo-nyung Archery Field	Archery	TBA	TBA
Chungju	Tangeum Lake	Rowing	TBA	Existing
Chungju	Chungju Indoor Gymnasium	Taekwondo	TBA	Existing
Chungju	Ho-am Gymnasium	Badminton	TBA	Existing
Chungju	Chungju Stadium	Athletics	15,000	Existing
Jeungpyeong County	Jeungpyeong Sports Center	Basketball	5,000	Existing

==== South Chungcheong Province ====
City	Venue	Events	Capacity	Status
Asan	Baemi Swimming Pool	Aquatics (water polo)	TBA	Existing
Asan	Yi Sun-sin Gymnasium	Volleyball	3,200	Existing
Boryeong	Boryeong Beach Volleyball Stadium	Beach volleyball	TBA	Temporary
Cheonan	Yu Gwan-sun Gymnasium	Volleyball	5,482	Existing
Cheonan	Dankook University Gymnasium	Volleyball	TBA	Existing
Cheonan	Cheonan Sangnok Country Club	Golf	TBA	Existing
Hongseong County	Chungnam International Tennis Stadium	Tennis	3,000; 1,000; 500 x4	New
Yesan County	Yoon Bong Gil Sports Gymnasium	Volleyball	TBA	Existing

== The Games ==
=== Sports ===
In addition to the 15 compulsory sports, up to three optional sports can be chosen, while respecting the infrastructure and local demands. The bid committee originally proposed rowing and sailing as optional sports. This would have been the third time in a row that rowing has been chosen as an optional sport, as it was in 2021 and 2025, while sailing was planned to return after for the first time since 2019. Despite this, infrastructure issues led to changes in plans and the Organizing Committee reviewed its planning in 2024, and decided that, in respect with local demands, retained rowing and replaced sailing and football (the latter of which was excluded from the program in staring in 2021) with golf (which returns after 2017) and beach volleyball, which remains in this status for two consecutive editions. On 12 January 2025, it was announced that para taekwondo will be part of the program.

- Aquatics
  - Diving (15)
  - Swimming (42)
  - Water polo (2)
- Archery (10)
- Athletics (51)
- Badminton (6)
- Basketball (2)
- Fencing (12)
- Golf (4)
- Gymnastics
  - Artistic gymnastics (14)
  - Rhythmic gymnastics (8)
- Judo (15)
- Rowing (11)
- Table tennis (7)
- Taekwondo (38)
- Tennis (7)
- Volleyball
  - Beach volleyball (2)
  - Volleyball (2)

== Schedule ==
All times and dates use Korea Standard Time (UTC+09:00)

OC	Opening ceremony	●	Event competitions	1	Event finals	CC	Closing ceremony

July/August 2027		July	August												Events
July/August 2027		31 Sat	1 Sun	2 Mon	3 Tue	4 Wed	5 Thu	6 Fri	7 Sat	8 Sun	9 Mon	10 Tue	11 Wed	12 Thu	Events
Ceremonies			OC											CC	—N/a
Aquatics
Aquatics	Diving		●	3	2	2	1	2	1	4					15
Aquatics	Swimming						4	6	7	7	6	7	5		42
Aquatics	Water polo	●	●	●	●	●	●	●	●	●	●	●	1	1	2
Archery									●	●	●	5	5		10
Athletics								2	6	11	7	11	14		51
Badminton					●	●	●	1	●	●	●	●	5		6
Basketball				●	●	●	●	●	●	●	1	1			2
Fencing				2	2	2	2	2	2						12
Golf							●	●	●	4					4
Gymnastics
Gymnastics	Artistic		●	1	1	2	10								14
Gymnastics	Rhythmic											●	2	6	8
Judo											5	4	5	1	15
Rowing				●	●	11									11
Table tennis				●	●	●	2	●	1	2	2				7
Taekwondo				4	10	2	3	4	4	4	4	3			38
Tennis				●	●	●	●	●	●	●	4	3			7
Volleyball	Beach						●	●	●	●	●	2			2
Volleyball	Indoor			●	●	●	●	●	●	●	1	1			2
Daily medal events		0	0	10	15	19	22	17	21	32	30	37	37	8	248
Cumulative total		0	0	10	25	44	66	83	104	136	166	203	240	248	248
