= Slovakia at the FISU World University Games =

Slovakia at the Universiade
- IOC code: SVK
- National federation: Slovak University Sports Association
- Website: www.saus.sk
- Medals: Gold 31 Silver 39 Bronze 54 Total 124

Summer appearances
- 1993; 1995; 1997; 1999; 2001; 2003; 2005; 2007; 2009; 2011; 2013; 2015; 2017

Winter appearances
- 1993; 1995; 1997; 1999; 2001; 2003; 2005; 2007; 2009; 2011; 2013; 2015; 2017

Slovakia has participated in all Summer and Winter Universiades since the dissolution of Czechoslovakia in 1993.

== Medal count ==
=== Medals at the Summer Universiade ===
Universiade	Gold	Silver	Bronze		Rank
1959–1991	part of Czechoslovakia				
(United States) 1993 Buffalo	0	0	1	1	37
(Japan) 1995 Fukuoka	1	1	2	4	22
(Italy) 1997 Sicily	4	0	2	6	10
(Spain) 1999 Palma de Mallorca	0	0	3	3	38
(China) 2001 Beijing	0	0	1	1	45
(South Korea) 2003 Daegu	0	2	3	5	31
(Turkey) 2005 İzmir	0	1	2	3	47
(Thailand) 2007 Bangkok	1	2	2	5	30
(Serbia) 2009 Belgrade	0	1	3	4	49
(China) 2011 Shenzhen	1	2	0	3	35
(Russia) 2013 Kazan	1	3	2	6	34
(South Korea) 2015 Gwangju	0	2	2	4	46
2017 Taipei	0	1	1	2	50
(Italy) 2019 Naples	1	1	2	4	29
(China) 2023 Chengdu	1	2	0	3	26
(Germany) 2025 Rhine-Ruhr	1	1	1	3	33
(South Korea) 2027 Chungcheong	Future events				
(United States) 2029 North Carolina	Future events				
Total	11	19	27	57	47

=== Medals at the Winter Universiade ===
Universiade	Gold	Silver	Bronze		Rank
1960–1991	part of Czechoslovakia				
(Poland) 1993 Zakopane	3	0	1	4	6
(Spain) 1995 Jaca	0	0	0	0	-
(South Korea) 1997 Muju-Chonju	4	0	0	4	7
(Slovakia) 1999 Poprad-Tatry	4	7	7	18	3
(Poland) 2001 Zakopane	2	1	3	6	8
(Italy) 2003 Tarvisio	0	2	3	5	18
(Austria) 2005 Innsbruck	0	0	2	2	21
(Italy) 2007 Turin	0	2	0	2	18
(China) 2009 Harbin	0	1	2	3	17
(Turkey) 2011 Erzurum	4	0	3	7	4
(Italy) 2013 Trentino	2	3	0	5	14
(Spain) / (Slovakia) 2015 Granada and Štrbské Pleso	1	3	4	8	16
(Kazakhstan) 2017 Almaty	0	0	2	2	24
(Russia) 2019 Krasnoyarsk	0	1	0	1	18
(United States) 2023 Lake Placid	0	1	0	1	22
(Italy) 2025 Turin	0	1	0	1	24
(China) 2027 Changchun	Future events				
Total	20	22	27	69	18

=== Medals by summer sport ===
Sport	Gold	Silver	Bronze	Total
Swimming	5	0	2	7
Shooting	3	4	7	14
Athletics	2	8	3	13
Tennis	1	5	13	19
Judo	0	1	2	3
Canoeing	0	1	0	1
Total	11	19	27	57

=== Medals by winter sport ===
Sport	Gold	Silver	Bronze	Total
Cross-country skiing	12	5	3	20
Biathlon	6	5	8	19
Alpine skiing	1	6	9	16
Ice hockey	1	3	3	7
Nordic combined	0	2	2	4
Freestyle skiing	0	1	0	1
Figure skating	0	0	1	1
Snowboarding	0	0	1	1
Total	20	22	27	69

== List of medalists ==
=== Summer Universiade ===
Medal	Name	Games	Sport	Event
Bronze	Patrícia Marková; Roman Šmotlák	(United States) 1993 Buffalo	Tennis	Mixed doubles
Gold	Martina Moravcová	(Japan) 1995 Fukuoka	Swimming	Women's 100 m freestyle
Silver	Marek Matuszek	(Japan) 1995 Fukuoka	Judo	Men's 60 kg
Bronze	Martina Moravcová	(Japan) 1995 Fukuoka	Swimming	Women's 200 m individual medley
Bronze	Patrícia Marková; Bohuš Danielcik	(Japan) 1995 Fukuoka	Tennis	Mixed doubles
Gold	Martina Moravcová	(Italy) 1997 Sicily	Swimming	Women's 100 m freestyle
Gold	Martina Moravcová	(Italy) 1997 Sicily	Swimming	Women's 200 m freestyle
Gold	Martina Moravcová	(Italy) 1997 Sicily	Swimming	Women's 100 m butterfly
Gold	Martina Moravcová	(Italy) 1997 Sicily	Swimming	Women's 200 m individual medley
Bronze	Patrícia Marková; Martina Ondrejková	(Italy) 1997 Sicily	Tennis	Women's doubles
Bronze	Patrícia Marková; Erik Csarnakovics	(Italy) 1997 Sicily	Tennis	Mixed doubles
Bronze	Jozef Krnáč	(Spain) 1999 Palma de Mallorca	Judo	Men's 66 kg
Bronze	Andrea Šebová	(Spain) 1999 Palma de Mallorca	Tennis	Women's singles
Bronze	Andrea Šebová; Patrícia Marková	(Spain) 1999 Palma de Mallorca	Tennis	Women's doubles
Bronze	Milan Haborák	(China) 2001 Beijing	Athletics	Men's shot put
Silver	Katarína Bašternáková; Stanislava Hrozenská	(South Korea) 2003 Daegu	Tennis	Women's doubles
Silver	Igor Zelenay	(South Korea) 2003 Daegu	Tennis	Men's singles
Bronze	Igor Zelenay; Ján Stančík	(South Korea) 2003 Daegu	Tennis	Men's doubles
Bronze	Igor Zelenay; Stanislava Hrozenská	(South Korea) 2003 Daegu	Tennis	Mixed doubles
Bronze	Jozef Krnáč	(South Korea) 2003 Daegu	Judo	Men's 66 kg
Silver	Katarína Bašternáková; Stanislava Hrozenská	(Turkey) 2005 İzmir	Tennis	Women's doubles
Bronze	Viktor Bruthans; Peter Miklušičák	(Turkey) 2005 İzmir	Tennis	Men's doubles
Bronze	Viktor Bruthans; Stanislava Hrozenská	(Turkey) 2005 İzmir	Tennis	Mixed doubles
Gold	Zuzana Štefečeková	(Thailand) 2007 Bangkok	Shooting	Women's trap
Silver	Daniela Pešková	(Thailand) 2007 Bangkok	Shooting	Women's rifle
Silver	Dana Velďáková	(Thailand) 2007 Bangkok	Athletics	Women's triple jump
Bronze	Zuzana Štefečeková	(Thailand) 2007 Bangkok	Shooting	Women's double trap
Bronze	Jozef Hupka	(Thailand) 2007 Bangkok	Shooting	Men's trap
Silver	Martina Hrašnová	(Serbia) 2009 Belgrade	Athletics	Women's hammer throw
Bronze	Katarina Kachliková	(Serbia) 2009 Belgrade	Tennis	Women's singles
Bronze	Katarina Kachliková; Martina Babáková	(Serbia) 2009 Belgrade	Tennis	Women's doubles
Bronze	Katarina Kachliková; Martina Babáková	(Serbia) 2009 Belgrade	Tennis	Women's team
Gold	Monika Zemková	(China) 2011 Shenzhen	Shooting	Women's skeet
Silver	Danka Barteková	(China) 2011 Shenzhen	Shooting	Women's skeet
Silver	Marcel Lomnický	(China) 2011 Shenzhen	Athletics	Men's hammer throw
Gold	Martin Kučera	(Russia) 2013 Kazan	Athletics	Men's 400 metres hurdles
Silver	Marcel Lomnický	(Russia) 2013 Kazan	Athletics	Men's hammer throw
Silver	Jozef Repčík	(Russia) 2013 Kazan	Athletics	Men's 800 metres
Silver	Miroslav Zaťko; Ľubomír Beňo	(Russia) 2013 Kazan	Canoeing	Men's K2 200 m
Bronze	Jana Hyblerová	(Russia) 2013 Kazan	Shooting	Women's 50 metre rifle prone
Bronze	Michal Slamka; Matúš Dudo; Boris Stanko	(Russia) 2013 Kazan	Shooting	Men's team trap
Silver	Matúš Bubeník	(South Korea) 2015 Gwengju	Athletics	Men's high jump
Silver	Filip Marinov	(South Korea) 2015 Gwengju	Shooting	Men's trap
Bronze	Filip Marinov; Matúš Dudo; Július Vass	(South Korea) 2015 Gwengju	Shooting	Men's team trap
Bronze	Katarína Listopadová	(South Korea) 2015 Gwengju	Swimming	Women's 100 m butterfly
Silver	Simona Parajová; Ivan Kosec	2017 Taipei	Tennis	Women's doubles
Bronze	Ján Volko	2017 Taipei	Athletics	Men's 200 metres
Gold	Patrik Jány	(Italy) 2019 Naples	Shooting	Men's 10 metre air rifle
Silver	Filip Marinov	(Italy) 2019 Naples	Shooting	Men's trap
Bronze	Adrián Drobný	(Italy) 2019 Naples	Shooting	Men's trap
Bronze	Patrik Jány; Matej Medveď; Štefan Šulek	(Italy) 2019 Naples	Shooting	Men's 10 metre air rifle team
Gold	Viktória Forster	(China) 2023 Chengdu	Athletics	Women's 100 metres hurdles
Silver	Viktória Forster	(China) 2023 Chengdu	Athletics	Women's 100 metres
Silver	Hana Burzalová; Ema Hačundová; Alžbeta Ragasová	(China) 2023 Chengdu	Athletics	Women's 20 km walk team
Gold	Eszter Méri	(Germany) 2025 Rhine-Ruhr	Tennis	Women's singles
Silver	Eszter Méri; Martina Marušinová	(Germany) 2025 Rhine-Ruhr	Tennis	Women's doubles
Bronze	Patrik Dömötör	(Germany) 2025 Rhine-Ruhr	Athletics	Men's 400 metres hurdles

=== Winter Universiade ===
Medal	Name	Games	Sport	Event
Gold	Ľubomíra Balážová	(Poland) 1993 Zakopane	Cross-country skiing	Women's 10 km classical
Gold	Ľubomíra Balážová	(Poland) 1993 Zakopane	Cross-country skiing	Women's 10 km freestyle
Gold	Ľubomíra Balážová	(Poland) 1993 Zakopane	Cross-country skiing	Women's 10 km combined
Bronze	Men's ice hockey team	(Poland) 1993 Zakopane	Ice hockey	Men's tournament
Gold	Ivan Bátory	(South Korea) 1997 Muju-Chonju	Cross-country skiing	Men's 15 km classical
Gold	Ivan Bátory	(South Korea) 1997 Muju-Chonju	Cross-country skiing	Men's 30 km freestyle
Gold	Ivan Bátory	(South Korea) 1997 Muju-Chonju	Cross-country skiing	Men's combined
Gold	Ivan Bátory; Martin Bajčičák; Peter Bartoň; Ivan Hudáč	(South Korea) 1997 Muju-Chonju	Cross-country skiing	Men's 4 x 10 km relay
Gold	Martina Halinárová	(Slovakia) 1999 Poprad-Tatry	Biathlon	Women's 15 km individual
Gold	Martina Halinárová	(Slovakia) 1999 Poprad-Tatry	Biathlon	Women's 7,5 km sprint
Gold	Martina Halinárová; Anna Murínová; Soňa Miholková	(Slovakia) 1999 Poprad-Tatry	Biathlon	Women's 3 x 7,5 km relay
Gold	Ivan Bátory; Martin Bajčičák; Andrej Párička; Ivan Hudáč	(Slovakia) 1999 Poprad-Tatry	Cross-country skiing	Men's 4 x 10 km relay
Silver	Men's ice hockey team	(Slovakia) 1999 Poprad-Tatry	Ice hockey	Men's tournament
Silver	Mária Kvopková	(Slovakia) 1999 Poprad-Tatry	Alpine skiing	Women's giant slalom
Silver	Jaroslava Bukvajová	(Slovakia) 1999 Poprad-Tatry	Cross-country skiing	Women's 5 km classical
Silver	Ivan Bátory	(Slovakia) 1999 Poprad-Tatry	Cross-country skiing	Men's 10 km classical
Silver	Ivan Bátory	(Slovakia) 1999 Poprad-Tatry	Cross-country skiing	Men's 15 km freestyle
Silver	Martina Halinárová	(Slovakia) 1999 Poprad-Tatry	Biathlon	Women's 10 km pursuit
Silver	Marcela Pavkovčeková	(Slovakia) 1999 Poprad-Tatry	Biathlon	Women's 7,5 km sprint
Bronze	Martin Novorolník	(Slovakia) 1999 Poprad-Tatry	Nordic combined	Men's individual
Bronze	Martin Novorolník	(Slovakia) 1999 Poprad-Tatry	Nordic combined	Men's sprint
Bronze	Jaroslava Bukvajová	(Slovakia) 1999 Poprad-Tatry	Cross-country skiing	Women's 10 km freestyle
Bronze	Michal Jurčo	(Slovakia) 1999 Poprad-Tatry	Cross-country skiing	Men's 30 km freestyle
Bronze	Soňa Miholková	(Slovakia) 1999 Poprad-Tatry	Biathlon	Women's 7,5 km sprint
Bronze	Anna Murínová	(Slovakia) 1999 Poprad-Tatry	Biathlon	Women's 10 km pursuit
Bronze	Miroslav Matiaško	(Slovakia) 1999 Poprad-Tatry	Biathlon	Men's 20 km individual
Gold	Martina Halinárová	(Poland) 2001 Zakopane	Biathlon	Women's 15 km individual
Gold	Men's ice hockey team	(Poland) 2001 Zakopane	Ice hockey	Men's tournament
Silver	Martina Halinárová	(Poland) 2001 Zakopane	Biathlon	Women's 10 km pursuit
Bronze	Pavol Hurajt	(Poland) 2001 Zakopane	Biathlon	Men's 12,5 km pursuit
Bronze	Matúš Hubka	(Poland) 2001 Zakopane	Snowboarding	Men's halfpipe
Bronze	Zuzana Smerčiaková	(Poland) 2001 Zakopane	Alpine skiing	Women's combined
Silver	Men's ice hockey team	(Italy) 2003 Tarvisio	Ice hockey	Men's tournament
Silver	Pavol Hurajt	(Italy) 2003 Tarvisio	Biathlon	Men's 20 km individual
Bronze	Jana Štaffenová	(Italy) 2003 Tarvisio	Alpine skiing	Women's combined
Bronze	Ivan Heimschild	(Italy) 2003 Tarvisio	Alpine skiing	Men's super-G
Bronze	Anna Pastrnáková	(Italy) 2003 Tarvisio	Cross-country skiing	Women's 15 km individual
Bronze	Pavol Hurajt	(Austria) 2005 Innsbruck	Biathlon	Men's 20 km individual
Bronze	Pavol Hurajt; Marek Matiaško; Miroslav Matiaško; Dušan Šimočko	(Austria) 2005 Innsbruck	Biathlon	Men's 4 x 7,5 km relay
Silver	Alena Procházková	(Italy) 2007 Turin	Cross-country skiing	Women's 5 km freestyle
Silver	Alena Procházková	(Italy) 2007 Turin	Cross-country skiing	Women's 10 km pursuit
Silver	Jaroslav Babušiak	(China) 2009 Harbin	Alpine skiing	Men's super-G
Bronze	Jaroslav Babušiak	(China) 2009 Harbin	Alpine skiing	Men's combined
Bronze	Men's ice hockey team	(China) 2009 Harbin	Ice hockey	Men's tournament
Gold	Alena Procházková	(Turkey) 2011 Erzurum	Cross-country skiing	Women's 10 km pursuit
Gold	Alena Procházková	(Turkey) 2011 Erzurum	Cross-country skiing	Women's 15 km freestyle
Gold	Alena Procházková	(Turkey) 2011 Erzurum	Cross-country skiing	Women's individual sprint
Gold	Alena Procházková; Peter Mlynár	(Turkey) 2011 Erzurum	Cross-country skiing	Mixed team sprint
Bronze	Women's ice hockey team	(Turkey) 2011 Erzurum	Ice hockey	Women's tournament
Bronze	Jana Gantnerová	(Turkey) 2011 Erzurum	Alpine skiing	Women's slalom
Bronze	Matej Kazár	(Turkey) 2011 Erzurum	Biathlon	Men's 20 km individual
Gold	Jana Gantnerová	(Italy) 2013 Trentino	Alpine skiing	Women's combined classification
Gold	Natália Prekopová	(Italy) 2013 Trentino	Biathlon	Women's 15 km individual
Silver	Barbara Kantorová	(Italy) 2013 Trentino	Alpine skiing	Women's combined classification
Silver	Jana Gantnerová	(Italy) 2013 Trentino	Alpine skiing	Women's downhill
Silver	Adam Žampa	(Italy) 2013 Trentino	Alpine skiing	Men's slalom
Gold	Paulína Fialková	(Spain) / (Slovakia) 2015 Granada and Štrbské Pleso	Biathlon	Women's 7,5 km sprint
Silver	Paulína Fialková	(Spain) / (Slovakia) 2015 Granada and Štrbské Pleso	Biathlon	Women's 10 km pursuit
Silver	Matej Falat	(Spain) / (Slovakia) 2015 Granada and Štrbské Pleso	Alpine skiing	Men's slalom
Silver	Zuzana Stromková	(Spain) / (Slovakia) 2015 Granada and Štrbské Pleso	Freestyle skiing	Women's ski slopestyle
Bronze	Paulína Fialková	(Spain) / (Slovakia) 2015 Granada and Štrbské Pleso	Biathlon	Women's 15 km individual
Bronze	Matej Falat	(Spain) / (Slovakia) 2015 Granada and Štrbské Pleso	Alpine skiing	Men's combined
Bronze	Jana Gantnerová	(Spain) / (Slovakia) 2015 Granada and Štrbské Pleso	Alpine skiing	Women's combined classification
Bronze	Federica Testa; Lukáš Csölley	(Spain) / (Slovakia) 2015 Granada and Štrbské Pleso	Figure skating	Ice dancing
Bronze	Barbara Kantorová	(Kazakhstan) 2017 Almaty	Alpine skiing	Women's combined
Bronze	Matej Falat	(Kazakhstan) 2017 Almaty	Alpine skiing	Men's combined
Silver	Men's ice hockey team: Erik Kompas Matej Tomek Erik Smolka Patrik Bačik Lukáš Ďurkech Vladimír Vybiral Ján Zlocha Martin Vyskoč Juraj Šiška Sebastian Šmída Radoslav Gábor Patrik Marcinek Martin Jendroľ Adam Kasanický Nino Ondris Jakub Tatár Filip Klema Matúš Mihalko Patrik Ligas Ivan Fedorko Dalibor Mikula	(Russia) 2019 Krasnoyarsk	Ice hockey	Men's tournament
Silver	Nikola Fričová	(United States) 2023 Lake Placid	Freestyle skiing	Women's Ski cross
Silver	Men's ice hockey team: Patrik Andrisík Denis Bakala Simon Bečár Tomáš Boľo Jakub Gaťár Šimon Groch Jozef Haščák Matej Jacko Matej Komloš Ján Marcinko Samuel Nagy Miroslav Novota Richard Petráš Marek Putala Jakub Ragan Michal Stanček Timotej Tomala Jakub Uram Lukáš Urbánek Matúš Zemko Adam Zlocha	(Italy) 2025 Turin	Ice hockey	Men's tournament

== Most successful Slovak competitors ==
No	Athlete	Sport	1st place, gold medalist(s)	2nd place, silver medalist(s)	3rd place, bronze medalist(s)	Total
1	Ivan Bátory	Cross-country skiing	5	2	0	7
2	Martina Moravcová	Swimming	5	0	1	6
3	Martina Halinárová	Biathlon	4	2	0	6
4	Alena Procházková	Cross-country skiing	4	2	0	6
5	Ľubomíra Balážová	Cross-country skiing	3	0	0	3
6	Martin Bajčičák	Cross-country skiing	2	0	0	2
7	Ivan Hudáč	Cross-country skiing	2	0	0	2
8	Men's ice hockey team	Ice hockey	1	2	2	5
9	Jana Gantnerová	Alpine skiing	1	1	2	4
10	Paulína Fialková	Biathlon	1	1	1	3

== See also ==
- Slovakia at the Olympics
- Slovakia at the Paralympics
- Slovakia at the European Games
- Slovakia at the Youth Olympics
- Slovakia at the European Youth Olympic Festival
- Slovakia at the World Games
