= Jumping Park =

Ski jumping hill in South Korea

Jump Park
- Location: Muju County; Muju Resort
- Coordinates: 35°53′06″N 127°44′30″E

Size
- K–point: 120

Jump Park is the ski jumping hills in the Muju Resort. It is located in Muju, South Korea. The ski jumping hills consist of a large hill with a K-point of 120, a normal hill with a K-point of 90, and two training hills. It hosted the ski jumping at the 1997 Winter Universiade. The latest events at the venue was the summer ski jumping held in September 2008.

== See also ==
- Muju Resort
- 1997 Winter Universiade
- List of ski areas and resorts in South Korea
