= High1 Resort =

Ski resort in Jeongseon, South Korea

High1
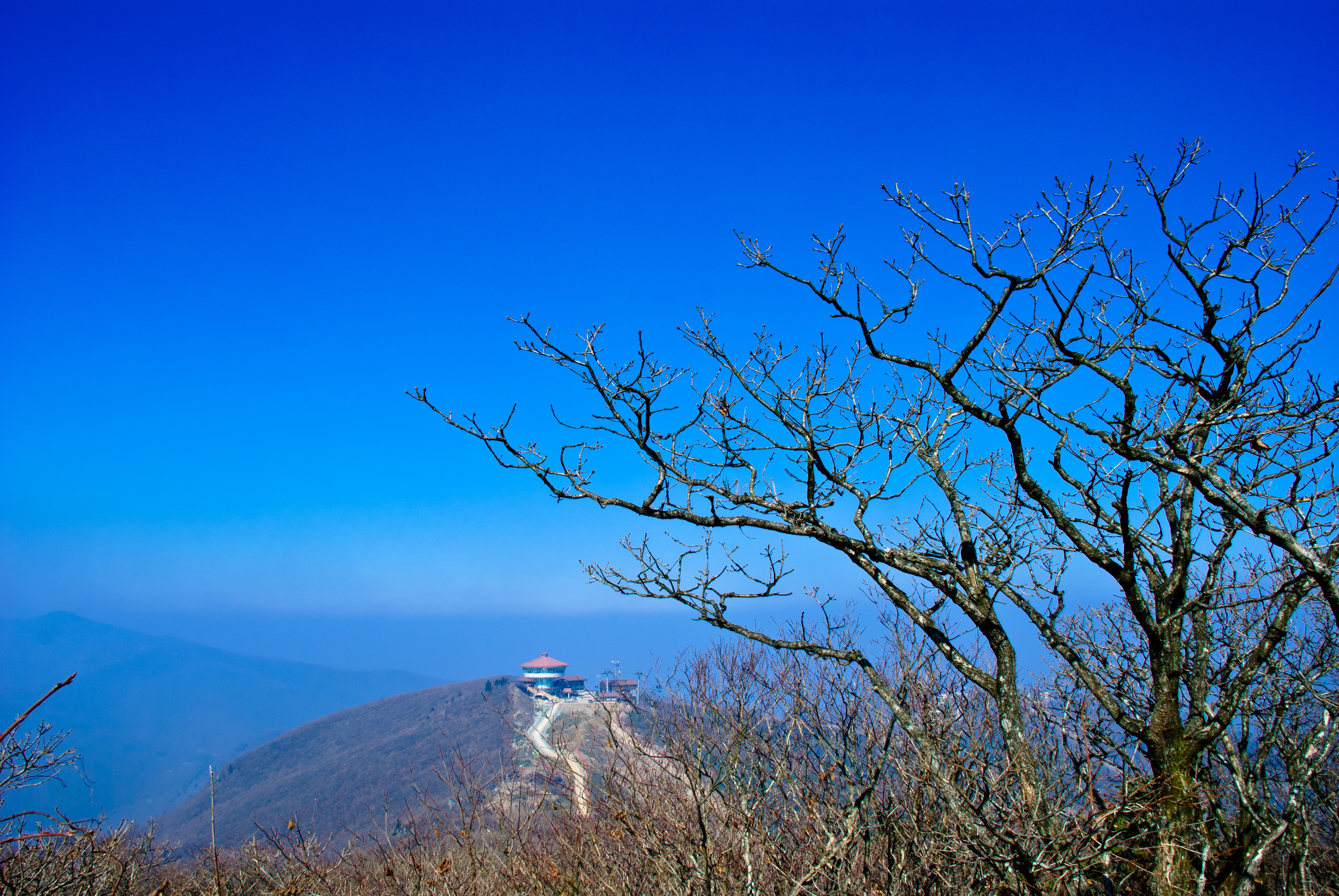
- High1 Top in autumn.

- Location within South Korea
- Location: Gohan, Jeongseon, Gangwon, South Korea
- Coordinates: 37°12′29″N 128°49′34″E
- Vertical: 643 m (2,110 ft) (Zeus 1+3)
- Top elevation: 1,376 m (4,514 ft)
- Base elevation: 733 m (2,405 ft)
- Skiable area: 815,757 m^{2} (8,780,740 sq ft)
- Trails: 18
- Lift system: 9 (including 3 gondola)
- Website: high1.com

High1 (Korean: 하이원, haiwon) Resort is a ski resort in Jeongseon, South Korea. Owned by the public corporation of Kangwon Land, it was developed to revitalize the declining mining towns of Gohan and Sabuk. The resort opened in December 2006. It is one of the largest ski resorts in South Korea along with Yongpyong Resort and Muju Resort.

High1 has three tops named High1 Top, Valley Top and Mountain Hub. High1 Top and Mountain Hub are served by a gondola. Valley Top is the highest point of the resort at an elevation of 1,376 metres (4,514 ft) above sea level. Valley Top is located just below the north of the summit of the Baegun Mountain which has an elevation of 1,426 metres (4,678 ft) above sea level.

Hihou (하이하우, haihau), a white hound is the mascot of the resort.

The resort is served by the Gohan Station and Sabuk Station.

== See also ==
- Kangwon Land
- List of ski areas and resorts in South Korea
