= Muju Resort =

Ski resort in Muju, South Korea

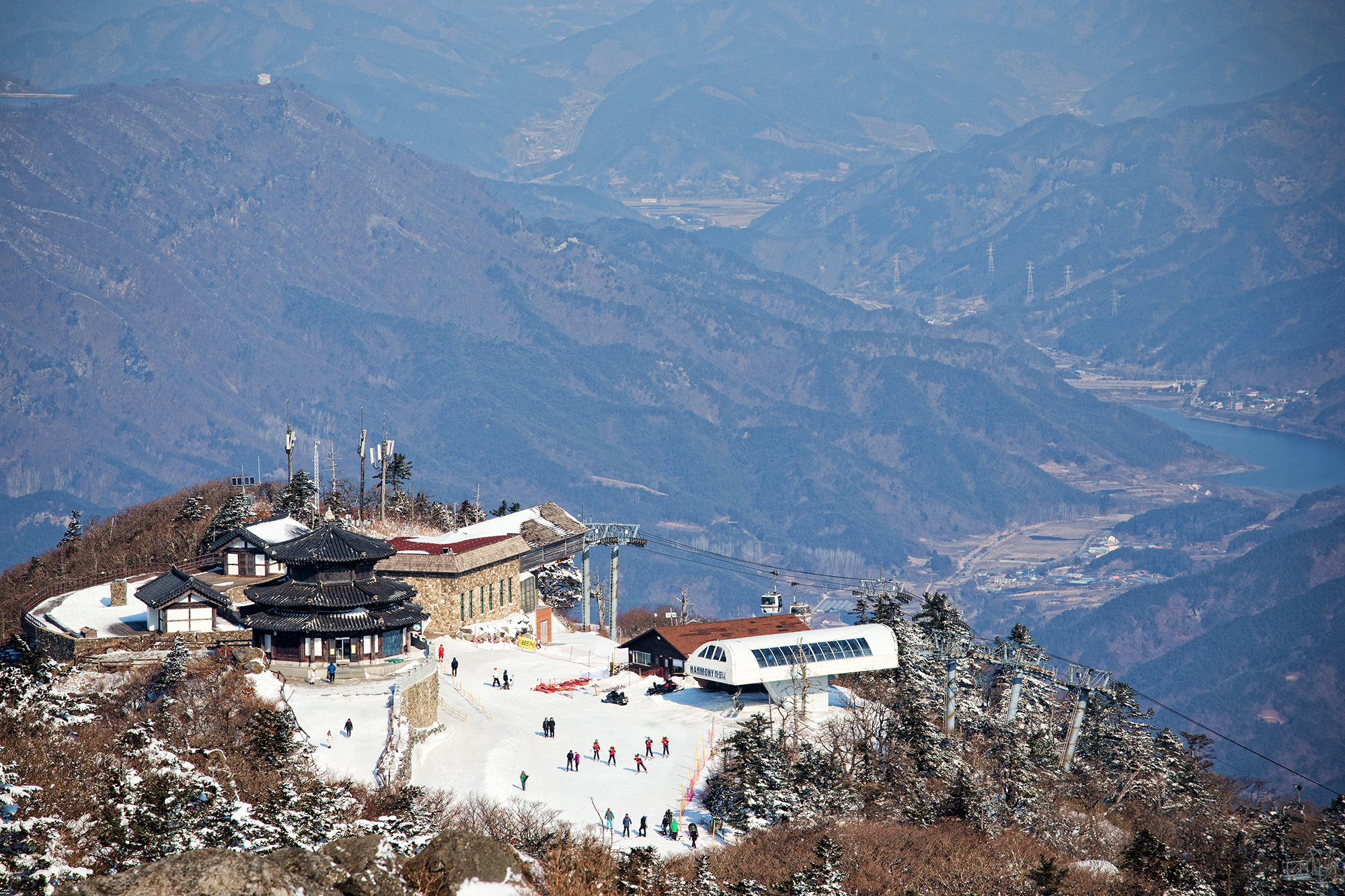
- Seolcheon Peak, the top of the Muju Resort

- Location within South Korea
- Location: Seolcheon-myeon, Muju County, North Jeolla Province, South Korea
- Coordinates: 35°53′27″N 127°44′13″E
- Vertical: 775 m (2,543 ft) (Silk Road)
- Top elevation: 1,520 m (4,990 ft)
- Base elevation: 745 m (2,444 ft)
- Skiable area: 1.2 km^{2} (0.46 sq mi) (max.)
- Trails: 34 (max.)
- Lift system: 14 (including 1 gondola)
- Website: mujuresort.com

Muju Resort (Korean: 무주리조트), officially Muju Deogyusan Resort (무주덕유산리조트) is a ski resort in Muju, South Korea. It is located on the north face of the Seolcheon Peak at an elevation of 1,520 metres (4,990 ft) above sea level on the Deogyu Mountain. Also located in the Deogyu Mountain National Park, it is the only ski resort in South Korea situated in national park.

The resort is one of the largest ski resorts in South Korea. It has the second-highest vertical drop in South Korea after the 2018 Winter Olympic downhill slopes and the highest vertical drop of the commercial resorts.

== History ==
The resort was opened on December 22, 1990 by Ssangbangwool Group. When it opened, the ski slopes only included the Manseon Peak, the western-half of the current slopes. For the 1997 Winter Universiade, the resort completed the ski jumping hills on September 16, 1996. It subsequently completed the Seolcheon Peak slopes and Nordic ski area together on December 5, 1996.

== See also ==
- Jumping Park
- 1997 Winter Universiade
- List of ski areas and resorts in South Korea
