= Deogyusan =

Mountain in South Korea

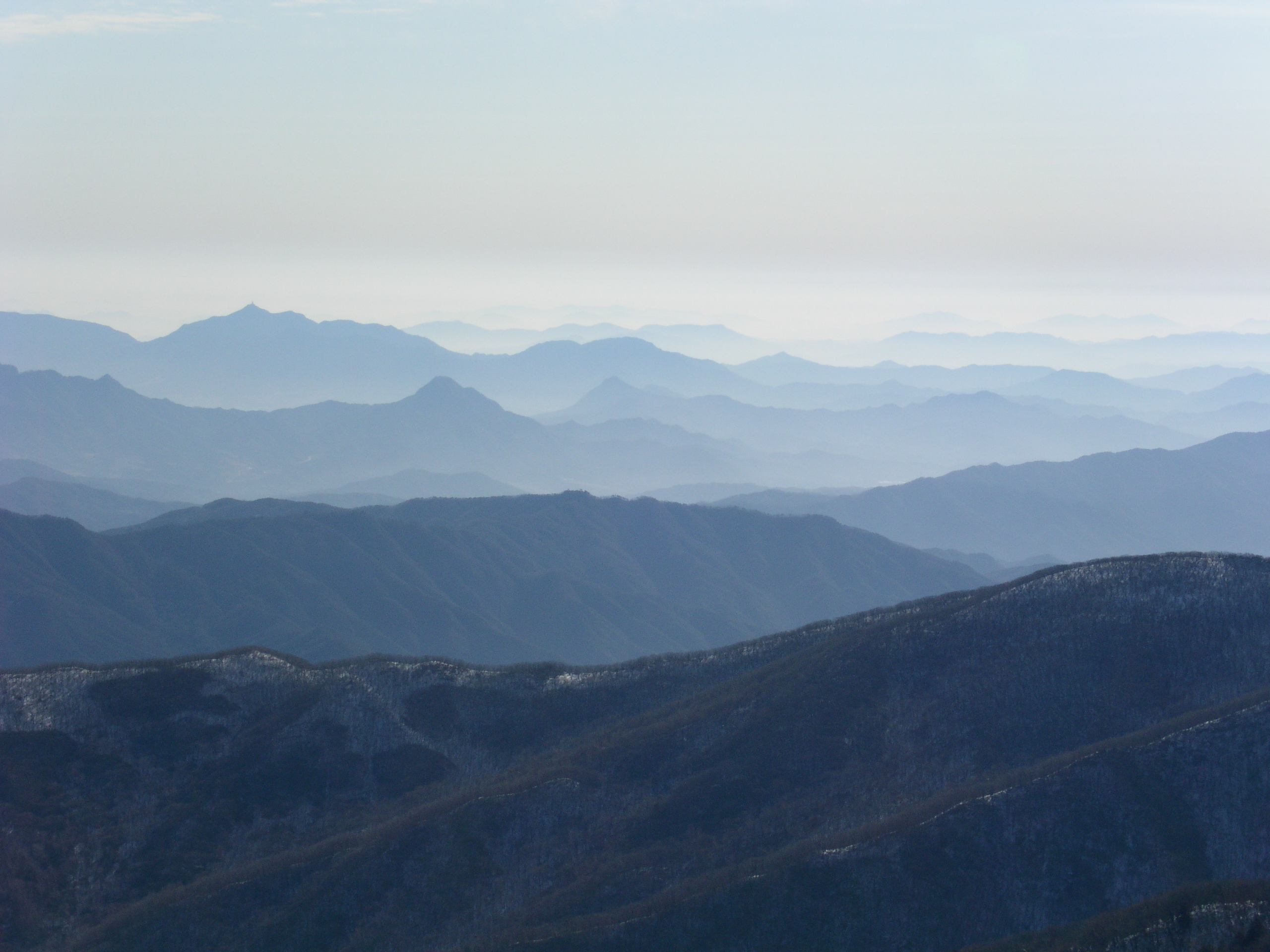
- Photograph of Deogyusan, taken from Hyangjeok Peak

Highest point
- Elevation: 1,614 m (5,295 ft)
- Prominence: 1,145 m (3,757 ft)
- Listing: Ribu
- Coordinates: 35°51′38″N 127°44′47″E

Geography
- Location: North Jeolla Province and South Gyeongsang Province, South Korea

Korean name
- Hangul: 덕유산
- Hanja: 德裕山
- RR: Deogyusan
- MR: Tŏgyusan

Deogyusan (Korean: 덕유산), formerly spelled Togyusan, is a mountain in South Korea. Its highest peak is 1,614 meters above sea level.

== Geography ==
Deogyusan stands on the border of North Jeolla Province and South Gyeongsang Province, covering portions of Muju and Jangsu Counties in Jeollabuk-do and Geochang and Hamyang Counties in Gyeongsangnam-do.

Deogyusan stands on the Baekdu-daegan, the mountainous spine of the Korean Peninsula. It is composed of numerous ridges which rise to various local peaks; the highest (by which the mountain's elevation is measured) is Hyangjeokbong.

== Attractions ==
Deogyusan is the cornerstone of Deogyusan National Park, established 1975. The attractions of the park include the Chiryeon Waterfall and Cheoksan mountain fortress. It is also famous for the winter ski resort of Muju.

== Animal and plant life ==
Approximately 250 animal species and 600 plant species are found in the Deogyusan area. An Amur Leopard was shot on Deogyusan in 1960, a few years before the species disappeared from South Korea. A total of 893 species of plants and 33 species of mammals, 122 species of wild birds, 2,206 species of insects, 9 species of amphibians, 13 species of reptiles and 23 species of freshwater fish were found. The distribution of major flora shows that broad-leaved trees and coniferous trees are distributed in the forest.

== See also ==
- List of mountains of Korea
- National parks of South Korea
- Baekdudaegan
- Jirisan
