= Ivan Bátory =

Slovak cross-country skier

Medal record

Cross-country skiing

Representing Slovakia

Junior World Championships
Silver medal – second place	1995 Gällivare	10 km classical

Winter Universiade
Gold medal – first place	1997 Muju-Chonju	15 km classical
Gold medal – first place	1997 Muju-Chonju	30 km freestyle
Gold medal – first place	1997 Muju-Chonju	45 km combined pursuit
Gold medal – first place	1997 Muju-Chonju	4 × 10 km relay
Gold medal – first place	1999 Poprad-Tatry	4 × 10 km relay
Silver medal – second place	1999 Poprad-Tatry	10 km classical
Silver medal – second place	1999 Poprad-Tatry	15 km freestyle

Ivan Bátory (born 3 May 1975) is a Slovak cross-country skier who has competed at the international senior level of cross-country skiing since 1993. He was born in Liptovský Mikuláš and lives in Uhorská Ves. As a cross-country skier, he competed for Štrbské Pleso SC.

Bátory competed in all eight World Ski Championships from 1995 to 2009 (best finish: sixth in 15 km at Val di Fiemme in 2003), all five Winter Olympics from 1994 to 2010 (best result: eighth in team sprint at Turin in 2006), and all three Tour de Ski events from 2006-07 to 2008-09.

Bátory's best World Cup results are three third places from Kiruna (1999, 10 km classical), Davos (2001, 15 km classical), and Beitostølen (2005, 15 km classical). His best World Championships result is sixth place in the 15 km classical event in Val di Fiemme in 2003, and his best Olympic result is eighth place in the team sprint in Turin in 2006.

In 2011, Bátory retired from cross-country skiing.

== Cross-country skiing results ==
All results are sourced from the International Ski Federation (FIS).

=== World Cup ===
==== Individual podiums ====
- 3 podiums – (3 WC)

No.	Season	Date	Location	Race	Level	Place
1	1999–00	27 November 1999	Kiruna, Sweden	10 km Individual C	World Cup	3rd
2	2001–02	15 December 2001	Davos, Switzerland	15 km Individual C	World Cup	3rd
3	2005–06	19 November 2005	Beitostølen, Norway	15 km Individual C	World Cup	3rd
