= Gohan-eup =

Coordinates: 37.202°N 128.853°E

- Town
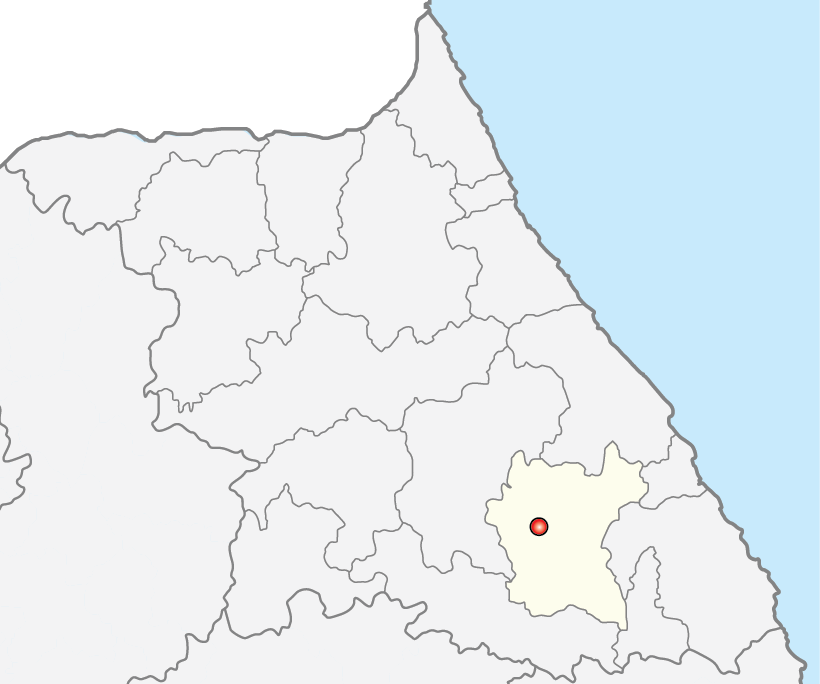
- Country: South Korea
- Region: Gwandong

Population
  - Population Size: 4,867 people
  - Dialect: Gangwon

Korean name
- Hangul: 고한읍
- Hanja: 古汗邑
- RR: Gohan-eup
- MR: Kohan-ŭp

Gohan-eup (Korean: 고한읍) is a town in Jeongseon County, Gangwon Province, South Korea, and the county seat of the county of Jeongseon. The town has a surface area of 52.32 km^{2} (20.2 mi^{2}) and a population of 9,940. It is located in the far southeast of Jeongseon County and is the southernmost town in the county. It is neighbored by Sabuk-eup in the north.

== History ==
- 1962: Sabuk-eup chartered.
- September 1, 1985: Sabuk-eup and Gohan-eup separate.
- June 29, 1998: Kangwon Land is founded and begins construction of Kangwon Land Casino and Hotel.

== Economy ==
Gohan-eup and neighboring Sabuk-eup were both heavily dependent on coal mining to sustain its economy for many years. When coal began losing favor as an energy source to oil and natural gas in the 90's, the local economy began to struggle and lag behind. In October 2000, Kangwon Land, Gangwon's largest casino and entertainment company opened Kangwon Land Casino and Hotel in Sabuk-eup, boosting the economy of both of the towns immensely.

Kangwon Land opened another attraction, High1 Resort, Korea's largest and most popular Ski resort and lodge boosting the tourism based economies of Gohan-eup and Sabuk-eup even further.

== Sport Events ==
In June, Gohan hosts the UTGD Skyrace.
