= Mario Visconti =

Italian tennis player

- Country (sports): Italy
- Born: 23 October 1968 (age 56); Eboli, Italy
- Height: 1.85 m (6 ft 1 in)
- Turned pro: 1991
- Plays: Right-handed
- Prize money: $151,136

Singles
- Career record: 2–6
- Career titles: 0
- Highest ranking: No. 154 (2 August 1993)

Grand Slam singles results
- French Open: 2R (1993)

Doubles
- Career record: 5–7
- Career titles: 0
- Highest ranking: No. 188 (1 August 1994)

Mario Visconti (born 23 October 1968) is a former professional tennis player from Italy.

== Career ==
In the 1993 French Open, his only Grand Slam appearance, Visconti defeated Luis Herrera to make the second round, where he was beaten by Carl-Uwe Steeb. His best ATP Tour performances also came that year. He teamed up with Massimo Ardinghi in August to make the doubles quarter-final at the Austrian Open and in the same month he also was a semi-finalist in the doubles at San Marino, partnering Paolo Canè.

== Challenger titles ==
=== Singles: (2) ===
No.	Year	Tournament	Surface	Opponent	Score
1.	1991	Jakarta, Indonesia	Hard	(Sweden) Douglas Geiwald	6–3, 1–6, 6–2
2.	1992	Bangalore, India	Clay	(Italy) Ettore Rossetti	6–4, 6–3

=== Doubles: (1) ===
No.	Year	Tournament	Surface	Partner	Opponents	Score
1.	1994	Tampere, Finland	Clay	(Slovakia) Branislav Gálik	(Sweden) Johan Donar (Sweden) Ola Kristiansson	6–4, 3–6, 7–5
