= Osaka Mayor's Cup =

Tournament information
- Founded: 1993
- Location: Osaka; Japan
- Venue: Utsubo Tennis Center
- Category: ITF Junior Grade A (1993–2022); J500 (2023–present)
- Surface: Hard - outdoors
- Draw: 64S / 32Q / 32D
- Website: www.kansaita.jp

Current champions (2025 )
- Singles: Egor Pleshivtsev (Boys) (France) Ksenia Efremova (Girls)
- Doubles: Ivan Iutkin (Boys); Egor Shcherbakov (France) Ksenia Efremova (Girls) (United States) Kristina Penickova

The Osaka Mayor's Cup is one of seven ITF J500 tournaments, the junior equivalent of ATP Masters or WTA 1000 events in terms of rankings points allocated. It is held on outdoor hard courts in Osaka, Japan, generally during the last week of September or the first week of October.

== Champions ==
=== Boys Singles ===
Year	Champion	Runner-up	Score
2025	Egor Pleshivtsev	(Japan) Kanta Watanabe	6–2, 6–2
2024	(South Korea) Hoyoung Roh	(United Kingdom) Oliver Bonding	7–6^{(7–2)}, 7–6^{(7–3)}
2023	(Austria) Joel Schwärzler	(Norway) Nicolai Budkov Kjaer	7–6^{(7–6)}, 7–5
2022	(South Korea) Gerard Campaña Lee	(United States) Jonathan Irwanto	6–3, 5–7, 6–4
2021	(Japan) Kenta Nakamura	(Japan) Yuta Tomida	4–6, 6–3, 7–6^{(7–4)}
2020	Tournament cancelled due to the COVID-19 pandemic		
2019	(France) Harold Mayot	(Switzerland) Jeffrey Von Der Schulenburg	6–1, 6–2
2018	(Japan) Keisuke Saitoh	(China) Bu Yunchaokete	7–5, 6–0
2017	(Japan) Yuta Shimizu	(Russia) Timofey Skatov	6–3, 7–6^{(7–5)}
2016	(Japan) Yosuke Watanuki	(Serbia) Miomir Kecmanović	2–6, 6–3, 6–2
2015	(Norway) Casper Ruud	(Hungary) Máté Valkusz	6–4, 6–0
2014	(United States) Taylor Harry Fritz	(South Korea) Chung Yun-seong	7–6^{(7–2)}, 6–3
2013	(United States) Michael Mmoh	(Japan) Jumpei Yamasaki	6–2, 7–5
2012	(Australia) Nick Kyrgios	(Japan) Kaichi Uchida	7–6^{(7–5)}, 7–6^{(7–4)}
2011	(Czech Republic) Jiří Veselý	(France) Lucas Pouille	6–2, 2–6, 6–1
2010	(Japan) Yasutaka Uchiyama	(Croatia) Mate Pavić	6–4, 1–6, 6–3
2009	(Australia) Jason Kubler	(Japan) Hiroyasu Ehara	6–0, 4–6, 6–2
2008	(India) Yuki Bhambri	(Japan) Hiroki Moriya	6–2, 6–3
2007	(United States) Ryan Harrison	(Chinese Taipei) Yang Tsung-hua	6–3, 6–4
2006	(Japan) Yūichi Sugita	(Finland) Harri Heliövaara	3–6, 6–2, 6–0
2005	(Croatia) Marin Čilić	(France) Jérémy Chardy	6–4, 6–4
2004	(South Korea) Jun Woong-sun	(South Korea) Kim Sun-yong	6–1, 7–6^{(7–4)}
2003	(Cyprus) Marcos Baghdatis	(France) Jo-Wilfried Tsonga	6–7^{(5–7)}, 6–3, 6–3
2002	(Hungary) György Balázs	(Japan) Go Soeda	6–2, 1–6, 7–5
2001	(Cyprus) Marcos Baghdatis	(Federal Republic of Yugoslavia) Janko Tipsarević	7–5, 7–6^{(7–5)}
2000	(Sweden) Joachim Johansson	(Chinese Taipei) Lu Yen-hsun	6–7^{(0–7)}, 7–6^{(7–3)}, 6–3
1999	(Denmark) Kristian Pless	(Sweden) Joachim Johansson	6–3, 6–2
1998	(Denmark) Kristian Pless	(Czech Republic) Ladislav Chramosta	6–1, 6–6 default
1997	(France) Arnaud Di Pasquale	(Czech Republic) Robin Vik	6–3, 6–2
1996	(France) Sébastien Grosjean	(Thailand) Paradorn Srichaphan	6–4, 6–0
1995	(United Kingdom) Martin Lee	(United Kingdom) Arvind Parmar	6–1, 6–2
1994	(Japan) Takao Suzuki	(Germany) Ulrich Jasper Seetzen	6–3, 6–3
1993	(Chile) Marcelo Ríos	(Romania) Răzvan Sabău	6–3, 3–6, 6–3

=== Boys Doubles ===
Year	Champion	Runner-up	Score
2025	Ivan Iutkin; Egor Shcherbakov	(Spain) Tito Chavez (Germany) Jamie Mackenzie	6–7^{(5–7)}, 6–4, [10–6]
2024	Timofei Derepasko (Japan) Naoya Honda	(United Kingdom) Oliver Bonding (South Korea) Hoyoung Roh	6–1, 3–6, [10–6]
2023	(United States) Adhithya Ganesan (China) Tianhui Zhang	(South Korea) Jangjun Kim (Australia) Hugh Winter	6–2, 3–6, [10–8]
2022	(United States) Adhithya Ganesan (Japan) Asahi Harazaki	(Sweden) Kevin Edengren (Ukraine) Volodymyr Iakubenko	6–3, 6–3
2021	(Japan) Takamasa Mishiro (Japan) Natsuki Yamamoto	(Japan) Rei Sakamoto (Japan) Yuta Tomida	6–4, 6–4
2020	Tournament cancelled due to the COVID-19 pandemic		
2019	(Switzerland) Jerome Kym (Switzerland) Dominic Stricker	(China) Hanwen Li (China) Yunchaokete Bu	6–3, 4–6, [10–4]
2018	(Japan) Tomoya Ikeda (Japan) Shunsuke Mitsui	(Japan) Tomoya Fujiwara (Japan) Taiyo Yamanaka	6–1, 7–5
2017	(Croatia) Admir Kalender (France) Valentin Royer	(France) Jaimee Floyd Angele (Colombia) Nicolás Mejía	7–6^{(7–4)}, 4–6, [10–4]
2016	(Serbia) Miomir Kecmanović (Turkey) Ergi Kırkın	(Japan) Toru Horie (Japan) Yuta Shimizu	6–2, 4–6, [10–2]
2015	(Chinese Taipei) Lo Chien-hsun (Japan) Yosuke Watanuki	(Japan) Masamichi Imamura (Japan) Yuki Mochiduki	7–6^{(8–6)}, 6–1
2014	(France) Corentin Denolly (Switzerland) Johan Nikles	(Japan) Yusuke Takahashi (Japan) Jumpei Yamasaki	6–4, 1–6, [10–4]
2013	(South Korea) Lee Duck-hee (Denmark) Simon Friis Søndergaard	(United States) Michael Mmoh (Australia) Akira Santillan	6–3, 6–3
2012	(Croatia) Borna Ćorić (United Kingdom) Alexander Sendegeya	(Australia) Omar Jasika (Australia) Nick Kyrgios	3–6, 7–6^{(8–6)}, [10–4]
2011	(Japan) Kaichi Uchida (Czech Republic) Jiří Veselý	(Australia) Andrew Harris (Australia) Luke Saville	1–6, 7–5, [10–4]
2010	(Croatia) Mate Pavić (Japan) Yasutaka Uchiyama	(Sweden) Morgan Johansson (Sweden) Stefan Lindmark	6–1, 6–4
2009	(France) Pierre-Hugues Herbert (Chinese Taipei) Hsieh Cheng-peng	(Japan) Hiroyasu Ehara (Japan) Yasutaka Uchiyama	6–0, 7–6^{(7–4)}
2008	(Croatia) Marin Draganja (Croatia) Vedran Ljubičić	(India) Yuki Bhambri (Chinese Taipei) Huang Liang-chi	7–5, 7–6^{(7–3)}
2007	(Chinese Taipei) Hsieh Cheng-peng (Chinese Taipei) Yang Tsung-hua	(Australia) Alex Sanders (Australia) Mark Verryth	6–4, 6–3
2006	(Japan) Sho Aida (Japan) Fumiaki Kita	(Japan) Tatsuma Ito (Japan) Hiromasa Oku	6–3, 6–3
2005	(France) Jérémy Chardy (Croatia) Marin Čilić	(Czech Republic) Roman Jebavý (Czech Republic) Jiří Košler	7–5, 6–3
2004	(South Korea) Jun Woong-sun (South Korea) Kim Sun-yong	(United Kingdom) Myles Blake (Kuwait) Abdullah Maqdas	6–4, 4–6, 6–4
2003	(India) Arun-Prakash Rajagopalan (India) Divij Sharan	(Australia) Lachlan Ferguson (Australia) Joel Kerley	7–6^{(7–4)}, 7–6^{(7–5)}
2002	(United States) Brendan Evans (United States) Chris Kwon	(United Kingdom) Luke Campbell (Australia) Christopher Singh	6–3, 6–4
2001	(Chinese Taipei) Chen Ti (Chinese Taipei) Jimmy Wang	(Chinese Taipei) Chang Kai-lung (Chinese Taipei) Hsieh Wang-cheng	6–4, 6–2
2000	(Federal Republic of Yugoslavia) Darko Mađarovski (Federal Republic of Yugoslavia) Janko Tipsarević	(Australia) Adam Kennedy (Australia) Todd Reid	6–4, 5–7, 6–2
1999	(Canada) Philip Gubenco (United States) Andy Roddick	(United Kingdom) Nick Greenhouse (United Kingdom) James Nelson	6–3, 6–4
1998	(France) Julien Jeanpierre (Argentina) David Nalbandian	(Czech Republic) Ladislav Chramosta (Czech Republic) Michal Navrátil	7–5, 6–3
1997	(Indonesia) Peter Handoyo (Egypt) Marwan Zewar	(United Kingdom) Simon Dickson (United Kingdom) David Sherwood	6–3, 7–6
1996	(France) Sébastien Grosjean (Sweden) Björn Rehnquist	(United Kingdom) Iain Bates (United Kingdom) Simon Dickson	6–3, 6–2
1995	(Australia) Jaymon Crabb (Australia) Dejan Petrović	(Chinese Taipei) Chen Wei-ju (Chinese Taipei) Huang Po-tsang	7–6, 6–3
1994	(Japan) Takao Suzuki (Japan) Yaoki Ishii	(Germany) Ulrich Jasper Seetzen (Germany) Nicolas Kiefer	7–6, 6–0
1993	(Japan) Satoshi Iwabuchi (Japan) Takao Suzuki	(Sweden) Kalle Flygt (Sweden) Martin Sjöqvist	6–4, 7–6

=== Girls Singles ===
Year	Champion	Runner-up	Score
2025	(France) Ksenia Efremova	Anna Pushkareva	6–1, 6–2
2024	(Israel) Mika Buchnik	(Australia) Alana Subasic	6–3, 6–7^{(1–7)}, 6–2
2023	(Australia) Emerson Jones	(Russia) Kristiana Sidorova	7–6^{(7–5)}, 7–5
2022	(Japan) Sara Saito	(Japan) Sayaka Ishii	6–2, 6–4
2021	(Japan) Hayu Kinoshita	(Japan) Anna Kobayashi	6–1, 6–2
2020	Tournament cancelled due to the COVID-19 pandemic		
2019	(France) Diane Parry	(Philippines) Alexandra Eala	6–2, 6–4
2018	(Denmark) Clara Tauson	(China) Zheng Qinwen	6–1, 6–0
2017	(China) Wang Xinyu	(United States) Whitney Osuigwe	6–4, 6–4
2016	(Russia) Anastasia Potapova	(Japan) Mai Hontama	6–2, 6–4
2015	(Japan) Mai Hontama	(Japan) Yuki Naito	6–1, 7–5
2014	(China) Xu Shilin	(Australia) Kimberly Birrell	7–5, 6–3
2013	(Serbia) Ivana Jorović	(Russia) Varvara Flink	6–1, 6–4
2012	(Czech Republic) Kateřina Siniaková	(Switzerland) Karin Kennel	6–4, 6–4
2011	(Poland) Zuzanna Maciejewska	(Japan) Makoto Ninomiya	7–6^{(7–5)}, 6–1
2010	(China) Zheng Saisai	(Japan) Miho Kawase	7–5, 6–7^{(5–7)}, 7–6^{(7–3)}
2009	(France) Kristina Mladenovic	(Hungary) Tímea Babos	7–6^{(7–5)}, 6–3
2008	(Romania) Ana Bogdan	(Japan) Kurumi Nara	3–6, 7–5, 6–2
2007	(Japan) Kurumi Nara	(Austria) Nikola Hofmanova	6–3, 6–1
2006	(Denmark) Caroline Wozniacki	(Japan) Ayumi Morita	6–3, 2–6, 6–2
2005	(Belarus) Victoria Azarenka	(Japan) Ayumi Morita	6–4, 6–2
2004	(Denmark) Caroline Wozniacki	(Slovakia) Dominika Cibulková	6–3, 6–0
2003	(Czech Republic) Veronika Chvojková	(Czech Republic) Andrea Hlaváčková	6–2, 1–6, 6–4
2002	(Japan) Ryōko Fuda	(Czech Republic) Lucie Šafářová	6–4, 4–6, 7–6^{(7–5)}
2001	(Czech Republic) Eva Birnerová	(Hungary) Virág Németh	7–5, 3–6, 6–3
2000	(Czech Republic) Renata Voráčová	(Federal Republic of Yugoslavia) Jelena Janković	3–6, 6–4, 6–2
1999	(Czech Republic) Dája Bedáňová	(United Kingdom) Katherine Vymetal	6–1, 6–3
1998	(Australia) Jelena Dokic	(Slovakia) Daniela Hantuchová	6–1, 6–3
1997	(Slovenia) Katarina Srebotnik	(Slovenia) Tina Pisnik	1–6, 6–1, 6–0
1996	(France) Amélie Mauresmo	(Croatia) Mirjana Lučić	6–1, 6–4
1995	(Japan) Haruka Inoue	(Poland) Aleksandra Olsza	7–5, 6–3
1994	(South Korea) Jeon Mi-ra	(United States) Corina Morariu	4–6, 6–2, 6–0
1993	(Japan) Hiroko Mochizuki	(Australia) Siobhan Drake-Brockman	6–3, 6–1

=== Girls Doubles ===
Year	Champion	Runner-up	Score
2025	(France) Ksenia Efremova (United States) Kristina Penickova	(Australia) Rianna Alame (Australia) Renee Alame	6–3, 4–6, [10–6]
2024	(Australia) Rianna Alame (Australia) Renee Alame	(Thailand) Kamonwan Yodpetch (Thailand) Lidia Podgorichani	6–3, 5–7, [10–8]
2023	(Japan) Hayu Kinoshita (Japan) Wakana Sonobe	(United States) Kaitlin Quevedo (United Kingdom) Mingge Xu	6–2, 5–7, [10–8]
2022	(Chinese Taipei) Li Yu-yun (Japan) Sara Saito	(Japan) Sayaka Ishii (Japan) Hayu Kinoshita	7–6^{(7–3)}, 6–1
2021	(Japan) Yoshino Fujita (Japan) Hayu Kinoshita	(Japan) Aoka Nagasawa (Japan) Kaho Oyama	6–1, 6–3
2020	Tournament cancelled due to the COVID-19 pandemic		
2019	(Russia) Maria Bondarenko (Thailand) Mai Napatt Nirundorn	(China) Bai Zhuoxuan (Chinese Taipei) Yang Ya-yi	7–5, 6–3
2018	(Japan) Mana Kawamura (Japan) Funa Kozaki	(Japan) Himari Satō (China) Zheng Qinwen	7–6^{(7–3)}, 6–4
2017	(South Korea) Park So-hyun (Japan) Himari Satō	(Chinese Taipei) Chen Pei-hsuan (China) Wang Xiyu	Walkover
2016	(Chinese Taipei) Lee Yang (China) Wang Xiyu	(United Kingdom) Emily Appleton (Russia) Anastasia Potapova	6–4, 7–5
2015	(Japan) Haruna Arakawa (Japan) Ayumi Miyamoto	(Ukraine) Dayana Yastremska (China) Zheng Wushuang	6–4, 6–4
2014	(Australia) Sara Tomic (China) Xu Shilin	(United Kingdom) Emily Arbuthnott (Denmark) Emilie Francati	6–1, 6–0
2013	(China) Xu Shilin (China) You Xiaodi	(Japan) Kyōka Okamura (Australia) Olivia Tjandramulia	6–1, 5–7, [10–5]
2012	(Japan) Mami Adachi (Japan) Hikari Yamamoto	(United Kingdom) Harriet Dart (United Kingdom) Katy Dunne	3–6, 7–5, [10–8]
2011	(Japan) Mami Adachi (Japan) Eri Hozumi	(Japan) Miyu Kato (Japan) Riko Sawayanagi	5–7, 7–5, [10–7]
2010	(Japan) Eri Hozumi (Japan) Miyu Kato	(Russia) Daria Salnikova (Russia) Ekaterina Semenova	6–4, 1–6, [10–6]
2009	(Hungary) Tímea Babos (France) Kristina Mladenovic	(Denmark) Mai Grage (China) Zheng Saisai	6–2, 7–5
2008	(Hungary) Tímea Babos (France) Kristina Mladenovic	(Japan) Miyabi Inoue (Japan) Aki Yamasoto	7–6^{(8–6)}, 7–6^{(8–6)}
2007	(Japan) Chinami Ogi (Japan) Kotomi Takahata	(Austria) Nikola Hofmanova (Russia) Ksenia Lykina	6–3, 4–6, 6–4
2006	(Japan) Ayumi Morita (Denmark) Caroline Wozniacki	(Russia) Ksenia Lykina (Russia) Anastasia Pivovarova	7–6^{(7–4)}, 7–5
2005	(Japan) Ayumi Morita (Japan) Erika Sema	(Japan) Akari Inoue (Japan) Yurina Koshino	6–3, 6–1
2004	(Japan) Megumi Fukui (Japan) Kaoru Maezawa	(Australia) Michelle Brycki (Australia) Shayna McDowell	6–3, 2–6, 6–4
2003	(Czech Republic) Andrea Hlaváčková (Finland) Emma Laine	(Japan) Nozomi Aiba (Chinese Taipei) Chan Yung-jan	7–5, 6–0
2002	(Slovakia) Kristína Czafiková (Finland) Emma Laine	(Australia) Daniella Dominikovic (Australia) Sophie Ferguson	6–2, 6–0
2001	(Chinese Taipei) Chan Chin-wei (Chinese Taipei) Hsieh Su-wei	(Japan) Mari Inoue (Russia) Svetlana Kuznetsova	6–4, 6–4
2000	(Czech Republic) Petra Cetkovská (Czech Republic) Renata Voráčová	(Chinese Taipei) Chan Chin-wei (Chinese Taipei) Hsieh Su-wei	7–5, 4–6, 6–2
1999	(Hungary) Anikó Kapros (France) Virginie Razzano	(Japan) Maki Arai (Japan) Kumiko Iijima	6–2, 5–7, 6–4
1998	(Denmark) Eva Dyrberg (Uzbekistan) Iroda Tulyaganova	(South Africa) Aniela Mojzis (United Kingdom) Helen Reesby	6–0, 5–7, 6–4
1997	(New Zealand) Leanne Baker (New Zealand) Rewa Hudson	(Japan) Shiho Hisamatsu (Japan) Remi Tezuka	7–5, 4–6, 6–2
1996	(Slovakia) Andrea Šebová (Slovakia) Gabriela Voleková	(South Korea) Choi Jin-young (South Korea) Chung Yang-jin	7–6, 6–2
1995	(Poland) Aleksandra Olsza (Czech Republic) Ludmila Varmužová	(Japan) Futaba Kubota (Croatia) Mirjana Lučić	6–4, 6–4
1994	(Slovakia) Martina Nedelková (Slovakia) Tatiana Zelenayová	(Japan) Nami Urabe (Japan) Futaba Kubota	6–4, 3–6, 6–1
1993	(South Korea) Jeon Mi-ra (South Korea) Paek Joo-ryun	(Japan) Hiroko Mochizuki (Japan) Yuka Yoshida	6–1, 3–6, 6–2
