= List of Slovakia Davis Cup team representatives =

This is a list of tennis players who have represented the Slovakia Davis Cup team in an official Davis Cup match. Slovakia have taken part in the competition since 1994.

== Players ==
Player	W-L (Total)	W-L (Singles)	W-L (Doubles)	Ties	Debut
Karol Beck	8–10	5–6	3–4	9	2002
Viktor Bruthans	0–1	0–1	0–0	1	2006
Kamil Čapkovič	0–1	0–1	0–0	1	2005
Pavol Červenák	2–1	2–1	0–0	2	2007
Branislav Gálik	1–1	1–0	0–1	1	1995
Norbert Gombos	2–8	2–7	0–1	5	2014
Dominik Hrbatý	33–25	28–14	5–11	26	1996
Martin Hromec	0–1	0–0	0–1	1	1998
Ivo Klec	1–0	1–0	0–0	1	2007
Martin Kližan	18–7	15–7	3–0	14	2007
Ján Krošlák	17–9	9–4	8–5	15	1994
Karol Kučera	33–18	27–11	6–7	25	1994
Lukáš Lacko	17–17	17–13	0–4	18	2006
Andrej Martin	4–4	2–3	2–1	5	2013
Michal Mertiňák	18–12	6–5	12–7	21	2003
Filip Polášek	9–4	1–0	8–4	12	2008
Branislav Stankovič	5–0	0–0	5–0	5	1994
Ladislav Švarc	0–2	0–2	0–0	2	2000
Marián Vajda	4–0	4–0	0–0	4	1994
Igor Zelenay	4–2	0–0	4–2	6	2003
