= Deogyusan National Park =

National park of South Korea

- 덕유산국립공원, 德裕山國立公園
- IUCN category V (protected landscape/seascape)
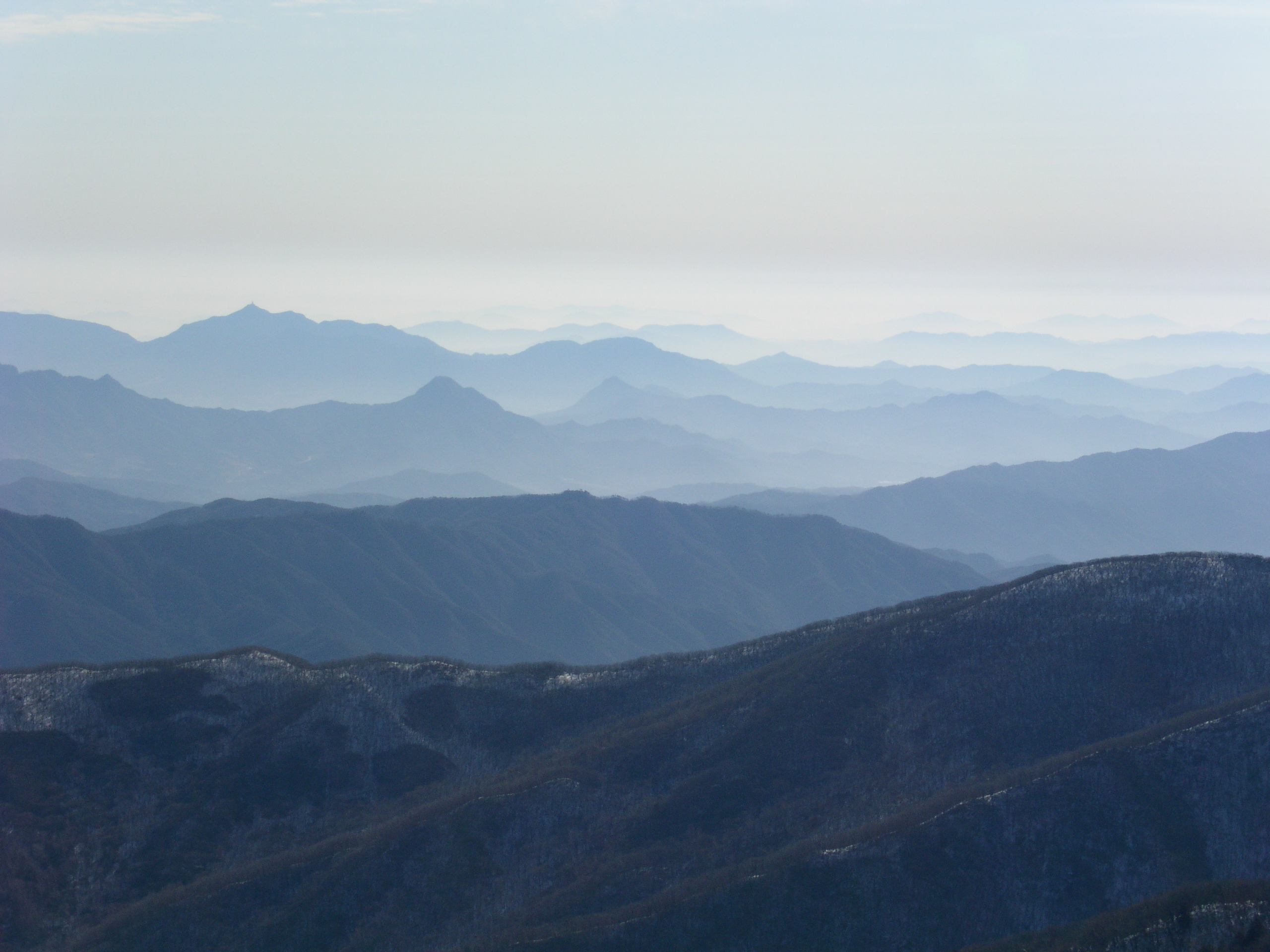
- Mountain Deogyusan, viewed from Hyangjeok Peak
- Interactive map of Deogyusan National Park
- Location: Jeollabuk-do, Gyeongsangnam-do, South Korea
- Nearest city: Muju
- Coordinates: 35.864°N 127.744°E
- Area: 231.65 km^{2} (89.44 sq mi)
- Established: 1 February 1975
- Visitors: 1 million
- Governing body: Korea National Park Service
- Website: english.knps.or.kr/Knp/Deogyusan/Intro/Introduction.aspx

The twenty-two national parks of South Korea.
Land-based parks are in red and marine parks are in blue.

Deogyusan National Park (Korean: 덕유산국립공원) is located in the provinces of Jeollabuk-do and Gyeongsangnam-do, South Korea. It was designated as the 10th national park in 1975. The park is home to a total of 1,067 plant species, 32 mammal species, 130 bird species, 9 amphibian species, 13 reptile species, 28 fish species, and 1,337 insect species. Endangered animals in the park include Siberian flying squirrel, yellow-throated marten and Eurasian otter.

== See also ==
- Deogyusan
