= Iain Bates =

British tennis official

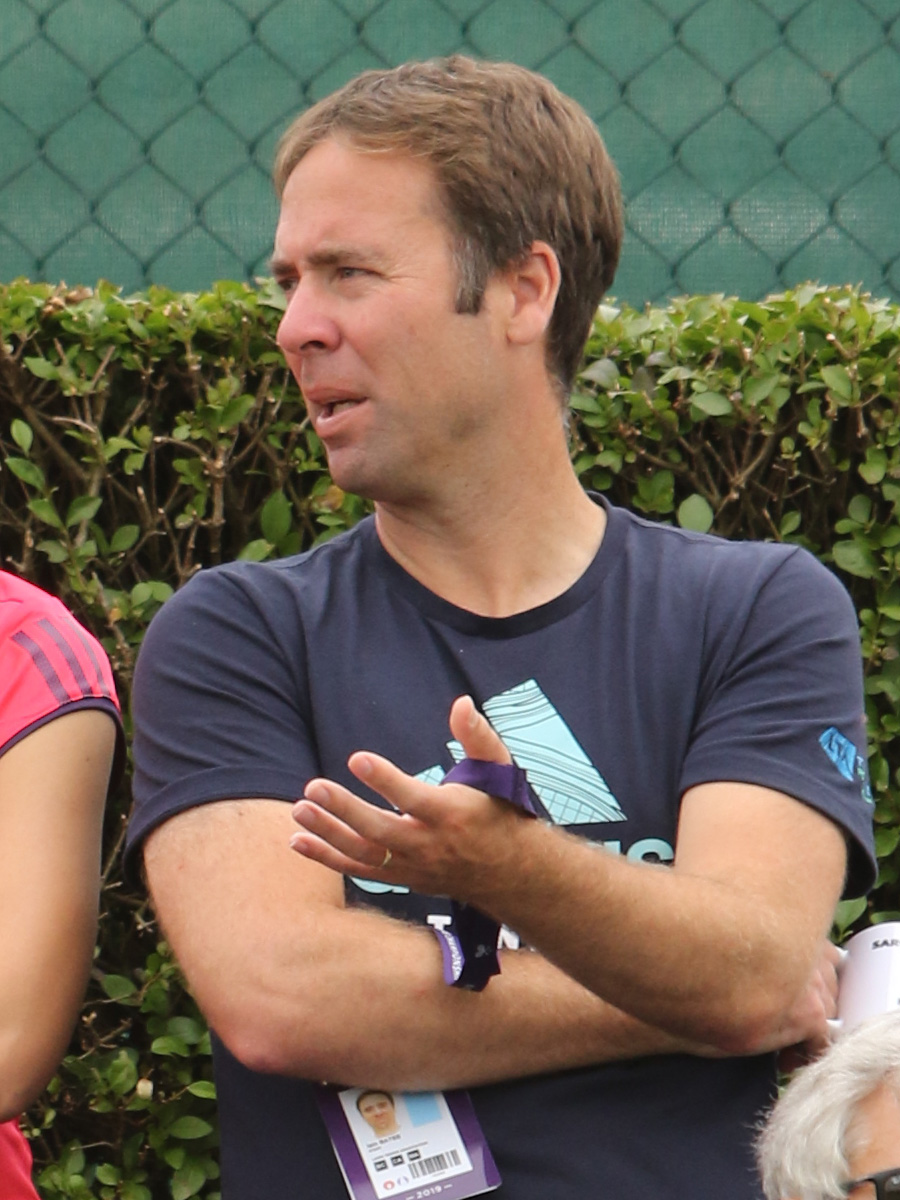
- Country (sports): United Kingdom
- Born: 24 January 1979 (age 46)
- Plays: Tennis

Singles
- Highest ranking: No. 760

Doubles
- Highest ranking: No. 623
Medal record
Men's Tennis
Representing Great Britain
Summer Universiade
Gold medal – first place	2003 Daegu	Men's Doubles

Iain Bates (born 24 January 1979) is the head of women's tennis at the British Lawn Tennis Association (LTA).

== Career ==
Bates started playing tennis at the age of six.

Bates was a promising British junior tennis player, who won the boys doubles final at the 1996 Osaka Mayor's Cup, and reached the second round of boys singles main draw at the Astrid Bowl and Junior Wimbledon in 1997.

He later became a university lecturer.

Bates was Lawn Tennis Association women's tennis manager until February 2013.

Bates was appointed head of women's tennis at the Lawn Tennis Association in February 2013, replacing Leon Smith.

Bates was also the Lawn Tennis Association Olympic Team Leader for the 2016, and 2020 Summer Olympics.

Bates has worked with Emma Raducanu since her early teens. He was part of her support team for the 2021 US Open where she won, and became her temporary coach in April 2022.
