= Branislav Gálik =

Slovak tennis player

- Full name: Branislav Gálik
- Country (sports): Slovakia
- Born: 20 October 1973 (age 51)
- Prize money: $35,635

Singles
- Highest ranking: No. 199 (21 October 1996)

Doubles
- Highest ranking: No. 223 (17 March 1997)

Branislav Gálik (born 20 October 1973) is a former professional tennis player from Slovakia.

== Biography ==
Gálik played Davis Cup tennis for Slovakia in 1995, for a tie against Egypt in Cairo. When Ján Krošlák was injured in one of the opening singles rubbers, Gálik came in to partner Karol Kučera in the doubles. They were beaten by the Egyptian pairing in a five set match and surrendered the tie with a loss by Kučera in the reverse singles. In the final reverse singles, now a dead rubber, Gálik was called up again and was able to defeat Amr Ghoneim to win Slovakia's second match of the tie.

During the 1990s he competed on the professional tour, as high as Challenger level. He won the 1994 Tampere Challenger doubles event with Mario Visconti and in 1996 was runner-up in the singles at the Alicante Challenger. His peak in singles came in 1996 when he made it to 199 in the world.

== Challenger titles ==
=== Doubles: (1) ===
No.	Year	Tournament	Surface	Partner	Opponents	Score
1.	1994	Tampere, Finland	Clay	(Italy) Mario Visconti	(Sweden) Johan Donar (Sweden) Ola Kristiansson	6–4, 3–6, 7–5

== See also ==
- List of Slovakia Davis Cup team representatives
