= Stanislava Hrozenská =

Slovak tennis player

- Country (sports): Slovakia
- Born: 17 June 1982 (age 42); Nitra, Czechoslovakia
- Turned pro: 1997
- Retired: 2017
- Prize money: $177,556

Singles
- Career record: 244–201
- Career titles: 3 ITF
- Highest ranking: No. 146 (27 January 2003)

Grand Slam singles results
- Australian Open: 1R (2003)
- French Open: Q2 (2002, 2005)
- Wimbledon: 1R (2003)
- US Open: Q2 (2004)

Doubles
- Career record: 145–115
- Career titles: 11 ITF
- Highest ranking: No. 151 (18 July 2005)

Team competitions
- Fed Cup: 0–1
Medal record
Tennis
Representing Slovakia
Summer Universiade
Silver medal – second place	2003 Daegu	Doubles
Silver medal – second place	2005 İzmir	Doubles
Bronze medal – third place	2003 Daegu	Mixed
Bronze medal – third place	2005 İzmir	Mixed

Stanislava Hrozenská (Slovak pronunciation: [ˈstaɲislaʋa ˈɦrɔzenskaː]; born 17 June 1982 in Nitra) is a retired Slovak tennis player. She was a semifinalist at the 1999 US Open – Girls' doubles tournament.

Hrozenská won three singles and eleven doubles titles on the ITF Women's Circuit. On 27 January 2003, she reached her best singles ranking of No. 146. On 18 July 2005, she peaked at No. 151 in the doubles rankings.

== ITF finals ==
=== Singles (3–7) ===
Legend $100,000 tournaments $75,000 tournaments $50,000 tournaments $25,000 tournaments $10,000 tournaments	Finals by surface Hard (1–4) Clay (2–3) Grass (0–0) Carpet (0–0)

Result	No.	Date	Tournament	Surface	Opponent	Score
Loss	1.	4 May 1998	Prešov, Slovakia	Clay	(Slovakia) Ľudmila Cervanová	2–6, 0–6
Loss	2.	16 November 1998	Los Mochis, Mexico	Hard	(Hungary) Zsófia Gubacsi	3–6, 6–2, 6–7^{(6–8)}
Loss	3.	19 April 1999	Jakarta 2, Indonesia	Hard	(Indonesia) Wynne Prakusya	3–6, 4–6
Loss	4.	14 June 1999	Poznań, Poland	Clay	(Poland) Anna Bieleń-Żarska	5–7, 3–6
Win	1.	16 August 1999	Maribor, Slovenia	Clay	(Bosnia and Herzegovina) Mervana Jugić-Salkić	4–6, 6–4, 6–2
Loss	5.	4 October 1999	Vila do Conde, Portugal	Hard	(Spain) Paula Hermida	1–6, 2–6
Loss	6.	26 November 2002	Minneapolis, United States	Hard (i)	(Belgium) Els Callens	5–7, 3–6
Win	2.	26 July 2004	Pétange, Luxembourg	Clay	(South Africa) Chanelle Scheepers	6–7^{(10–12)}, 6–1, 6–4
Win	3.	19 February 2007	Clearwater, United States	Hard	(United States) Madison Brengle	6–4, 6–3
Loss	7.	7 May 2007	Warsaw 1, Poland	Clay	(France) Violette Huck	6–3, 4–6, 5–7

=== Doubles (11–13) ===
Legend $100,000 tournaments $75,000 tournaments $50,000 tournaments $25,000 tournaments $10,000 tournaments	Finals by surface Hard (3–6) Clay (8–7) Grass (0–0) Carpet (0–0)

Result	No.	Date	Tournament	Surface	Partner	Opponents	Score
Win	1.	14 June 1999	Poznań, Poland	Clay	(Slovakia) Katarína Bašternáková	(Slovakia) Eva Fislová (Slovakia) Gabriela Voleková	6–3, 7–5
Win	2.	4 October 1999	Vila do Conde, Portugal	Hard	(Slovakia) Ľubomíra Kurhajcová	(Slovakia) Danica Kováčová (Portugal) Carlota Santos	6–1, 6–2
Win	3.	7 May 2001	Prešov, Slovakia	Clay	(Slovakia) Eva Fislová	(Czech Republic) Barbora Machovská (Czech Republic) Kristýna Pešatová	w/o
Loss	1.	23 April 2002	Taranto, Italy	Clay	(Slovakia) Eva Fislová	(China) Yan Zi (China) Zheng Jie	2–6, 2–6
Win	4.	29 July 2002	Saint-Gaudens, France	Clay	(Slovakia) Ľudmila Cervanová	(Australia) Sarah Stone (Australia) Samantha Stosur	7–6^{(7–5)}, 6–4
Loss	2.	5 August 2002	Rimini, Italy	Clay	(Slovakia) Eva Fislová	(Brazil) Maria Fernanda Alves (Brazil) Carla Tiene	4–6, 4–6
Win	5.	17 March 2003	Castellón, Spain	Clay	(Slovakia) Ľudmila Cervanová	(Spain) Rosa María Andrés Rodríguez (Spain) Mariam Ramón Climent	4–6, 6–3, 6–0
Win	6.	17 February 2004	Columbus, United States	Hard (i)	(Czech Republic) Lenka Němečková	(New Zealand) Leanne Baker (Italy) Francesca Lubiani	7–6^{(7–3)}, 4–6, 6–3
Loss	3.	12 July 2004	Garching bei München, Germany	Clay	(Germany) Angelika Bachmann	(Argentina) Erica Krauth (France) Aurélie Védy	4–6, 6–7^{(5–7)}
Loss	4.	20 July 2004	Innsbruck, Austria	Clay	(Czech Republic) Lenka Němečková	(Ukraine) Alona Bondarenko (Russia) Galina Fokina	2–6, 4–6
Win	7.	26 July 2004	Pétange, Luxembourg	Clay	(Slovakia) Eva Fislová	(Australia) Evie Dominikovic (Russia) Goulnara Fattakhetdinova	6–4, 6–3
Win	8.	3 August 2004	Hechingen, Germany	Clay	(Slovakia) Eva Fislová	(Argentina) Erica Krauth (Germany) Jasmin Wöhr	3–6, 6–3, 6–3
Loss	5.	12 October 2004	Sunderland 2, United Kingdom	Hard (i)	(Slovakia) Eva Fislová	(United Kingdom) Elena Baltacha (United Kingdom) Jane O'Donoghue	1–6, 6–4, 2–6
Loss	6.	1 November 2004	Sint-Katelijne-Waver, Belgium	Hard (i)	(Slovakia) Eva Fislová	(France) Virginie Pichet (Tunisia) Selima Sfar	1–6, 6–7^{(2–7)}
Loss	7.	21 June 2005	Fontanafredda, Italy	Clay	(Slovakia) Eva Fislová	(Bosnia and Herzegovina) Mervana Jugić-Salkić (Croatia) Darija Jurak	7–5, 3–6, 4–6
Loss	8.	11 July 2005	Vittel, France	Clay	(Czech Republic) Lenka Němečková	(Czech Republic) Hana Šromová (Czech Republic) Renata Voráčová	4–6, 4–6
Win	9.	12 October 2005	Jersey, United Kingdom	Hard (i)	(Czech Republic) Veronika Chvojková	(Republic of Ireland) Kelly Liggan (Belarus) Nadejda Ostrovskaya	4–6, 6–2, 7–5
Loss	9.	3 July 2006	Stuttgart-Vaihingen 2, Germany	Clay	(Slovakia) Eva Fislová	(Romania) Monica Niculescu (Czech Republic) Renata Voráčová	2–6, 7–6^{(7–4)}, 5–7
Win	10.	7 August 2006	Hechingen, Germany	Clay	(Slovakia) Eva Fislová	(Ukraine) Kristina Antoniychuk (Romania) Raluca Olaru	6–3, 6–7^{(3–7)}, 6–3
Win	11.	15 August 2006	Bratislava 1, Slovakia	Clay	(Slovakia) Eva Fislová	(Romania) Diana Enache (Germany) Maren Kassens	6–2, 6–2
Loss	10.	15 November 2006	Přerov, Czech Republic	Hard (i)	(Czech Republic) Eva Hrdinová	(Czech Republic) Nikola Fraňková (Czech Republic) Andrea Hlaváčková	2–6, 7–6^{(7–5)}, 3–6
Loss	11.	25 June 2007	Istanbul 2, Turkey	Hard	(Russia) Maria Kondratieva	(Australia) Monique Adamczak (Ukraine) Tetiana Luzhanska	4–6, 4–6
Loss	12.	11 March 2013	Sharm El Sheikh, Egypt	Hard	(Czech Republic) Alena Poletinová	(Germany) Franziska König (Germany) Sarah-Rebecca Sekulic	w/o
Loss	13.	12 August 2013	Uşak, Turkey	Hard	(Germany) Michaela Frlicka	(Australia) Nicole Collie (Australia) Leah Daw	3–6, 4–6

== Fed Cup participation ==
=== Doubles ===
Edition	Stage	Date	Location	Against	Surface	Partner	Opponents	W/L	Score
2005 Fed Cup; World Group II	WG2	24 April 2005	Neuchâtel, Switzerland	Switzerland	Hard (i)	(Slovakia) Eva Fislová	(Switzerland) Timea Bacsinszky (Switzerland) Myriam Casanova	L	3–6, 2–6
