= Viktor Bruthans =

Slovak tennis player

- Full name: Viktor Bruthans
- Country (sports): Slovakia
- Born: 9 November 1979 (age 46) Kyjov, Czechoslovakia
- Prize money: $111,244

Singles
- Highest ranking: No. 238 (10 October 2005)

Doubles
- Highest ranking: No. 240 (26 July 2004)
Medal record
Tennis
Representing Slovakia
Summer Universiade
Bronze medal – third place	2005 İzmir	Doubles
Bronze medal – third place	2005 İzmir	Mixed

Viktor Bruthans (born 9 November 1979) is a Slovak former professional tennis player.

== Biography ==
Bruthans was born in the Kyjov, Czechoslovakia (now in the Czech Republic).

At the 2005 Summer Universiade in İzmir, he won bronze medals for Slovakia in both the men's doubles and mixed doubles events.

His professional career was spent on the Futures and Challenger circuits. As a singles player he reached 238 in the world, with Futures titles in India, Ukraine and Nigeria, as well as a runners-up trophy at the 2005 Togliatti Challenger. He won two Challenger titles in doubles.

Bruthans made several attempts to qualify for the main draw of a Grand Slam tournament, most notably at the 2005 Australian Open, where he reached the final round of qualifying.

In 2006 he represented Slovakia in a Davis Cup tie against Chile in Rancagua. The tie, a World Group opener, was secured by Chile after the doubles match, which gave Bruthans an opportunity as the reverse singles were dead rubbers. He lost his match in straight sets to Paul Capdeville.

== Challenger titles ==
=== Doubles: (2) ===
No.	Year	Tournament	Surface	Partner	Opponents	Score
1.	2003	Samarkand, Uzbekistan	Clay	(Ukraine) Sergiy Stakhovsky	(Russia) Pavel Ivanov (Serbia and Montenegro) Darko Mađarovski	6–2, 6–4
2.	2006	Košice, Slovakia	Clay	(Czech Republic) Pavel Šnobel	(Slovakia) Kamil Čapkovič (Slovakia) Lukáš Lacko	7–5, 5–7, 10–4

== See also ==
- List of Slovakia Davis Cup team representatives
