= Tennis at the 2003 Summer Universiade =

- Location: Daegu, South Korea.

Champions

Men's singles
- Lu Yen-hsun (TPE)

Women's singles
- Goulnara Fattakhetdinova (RUS)

Men's doubles
- Iain Bates / Jim May (GBR)

Women's doubles
- Chan Chin-wei / Chuang Chia-jung (TPE)

Mixed doubles
- Maria Goloviznina / Artem Derepasko (RUS)
- Summer Universiade

Tennis events were contested at the 2003 Summer Universiade in Daegu, South Korea.

== Medal summary ==
Event	Gold	Silver	Bronze
Men's singles	Lu Yen-hsun (TPE)	Igor Zelenay (SVK)	Matthieu Amgwerd (SUI)
Men's singles	Lu Yen-hsun (TPE)	Igor Zelenay (SVK)	Kim Young-jun (KOR)
Men's doubles	Iain Bates and Jim May (GBR)	Rodrigo Echagaray and Carlos Alberto Lozano (MEX)	Ján Stančík and Igor Zelenay (SVK)
Men's doubles	Iain Bates and Jim May (GBR)	Rodrigo Echagaray and Carlos Alberto Lozano (MEX)	Sanchai Ratiwatana and Sonchat Ratiwatana (THA)
Women's singles	Goulnara Fattakhetdinova (RUS)	Xie Yanze (CHN)	Akgul Amanmuradova (UZB)
Women's singles	Goulnara Fattakhetdinova (RUS)	Xie Yanze (CHN)	Liu Nannan (CHN)
Women's doubles	Chan Chin-wei and Chuang Chia-jung (TPE)	Katarína Bašternáková and Stanislava Hrozenská (SVK)	Hanna Krampe and Lydia Steinbach (GER)
Women's doubles	Chan Chin-wei and Chuang Chia-jung (TPE)	Katarína Bašternáková and Stanislava Hrozenská (SVK)	Lorena Arias and Erika Valdés (MEX)
Mixed doubles	Maria Goloviznina and Artem Derepasko (RUS)	Xie Yanze and Wang Yu (CHN)	Lydia Steinbach and Jan Boruszewski (GER)
Mixed doubles	Maria Goloviznina and Artem Derepasko (RUS)	Xie Yanze and Wang Yu (CHN)	Stanislava Hrozenská and Igor Zelenay (SVK)

== Medal table ==
Rank	Nation	Gold	Silver	Bronze	Total
1	Chinese Taipei (TPE)	2	0	0	2
1	Russia (RUS)	2	0	0	2
3	Great Britain (GBR)	1	0	0	1
4	Slovakia (SVK)	0	2	2	4
5	China (CHN)	0	2	1	3
6	Mexico (MEX)	0	1	1	2
7	Germany (GER)	0	0	2	2
8	South Korea (KOR)	0	0	1	1
8	Switzerland (SUI)	0	0	1	1
8	Thailand (THA)	0	0	1	1
8	Uzbekistan (UZB)	0	0	1	1
Totals (11 entries)		5	5	10	20

== See also ==
- Tennis at the Summer Universiade
