= 1997 Winter Universiade =

Multi-sport event in Muju and Jeonju, South Korea

XVIII Winter Universiade 제18회 동계 유니버시아드
- Host city: Muju and Chonju, South Korea
- Nations: 48
- Athletes: 1,406
- Events: 7 sports
- Opening: January 24, 1997
- Closing: February 2, 1997
- Opened by: Kim Young-sam
- Torch lighter: Kim Ki-hoon
- Main venue: Muju Resort

The 1997 Winter Universiade, the XVIII Winter Universiade, took place in Muju and Chonju (Jeonju), Jeonbuk province, South Korea. The snow sport events were held in Muju Resort in Muju. The ice events were held in Chonju, the provincial capital about 55 kilometers from Muju Resort.

On 6 July 1993 during the 1993 Summer Universiade in Buffalo, US, FISU decided that South Korea would host the 1997 Winter Universiade. These were both the first winter multi-sport event and Universiade held in South Korea. The games were the largest sport event in South Korea in the 1990s, along with the 1999 Asian Winter Games.

== Logo ==
- The two laughing profiles in a U-shape are inspired by a 'U', the first letter of the Universiade and intended to give out a soft and tender image.
- The colors of blue and red, the two theme colors of the Korean national flag, Taeguk' ki, symbolizes the goal of the Winter Universiade '97-bringing harmony among university students from every corner of the globe through a sports festival.
- The red circle at the upper right corner of the emblem is the symbol and dream of youth for a brighter and more peaceful future.

== Mascot ==
The official mascot of the 1997 Winter Universiade is Mudori (무돌이), a squirrel. Its name is derived from the main host county, Muju.

== Venues ==
=== Muju ===
- Muju Resort – Alpine skiing and organizing committee headquarters
  - Jumping Park – Ski jumping, Nordic combined, opening ceremonies and closing ceremonies
  - Muju Area – Cross-country skiing, biathlon and Nordic combined

=== Chonju (Jeonju) ===
- Chonju Indoor Ice Rink #1 – Figure skating and short track speed skating
- Chonju Indoor Ice Rink #2 (currently Hwasan Gymnasium) – Ice hockey
- Chonju Stadium – Speed skating (on the temporary ice mat)

== Medal table ==
* Host nation (South Korea)

| Rank | Nation | Gold | Silver | Bronze | Total |
|---|---|---|---|---|---|
| 1 | Japan (JPN) | 9 | 9 | 7 | 25 |
| 2 | Russia (RUS) | 9 | 6 | 9 | 24 |
| 3 | Slovenia (SLO) | 7 | 4 | 4 | 15 |
| 4 | China (CHN) | 6 | 4 | 6 | 16 |
| 5 | Netherlands (NED) | 6 | 4 | 1 | 11 |
| 6 | South Korea (KOR)* | 5 | 2 | 4 | 11 |
| 7 | Slovakia (SVK) | 4 | 0 | 0 | 4 |
| 8 | Czech Republic (CZE) | 2 | 0 | 3 | 5 |
| 9 | France (FRA) | 1 | 2 | 1 | 4 |
| 10 | Sweden (SWE) | 1 | 1 | 1 | 3 |
| 11 | Poland (POL) | 1 | 0 | 0 | 1 |
| 12 | Belarus (BLR) | 0 | 5 | 1 | 6 |
| 13 | Austria (AUT) | 0 | 4 | 3 | 7 |
| 13 | Italy (ITA) | 0 | 4 | 3 | 7 |
| 15 | Ukraine (UKR) | 0 | 2 | 2 | 4 |
| 16 | United States (USA) | 0 | 1 | 4 | 5 |
| 17 | Bulgaria (BUL) | 0 | 1 | 0 | 1 |
| 17 | Finland (FIN) | 0 | 1 | 0 | 1 |
| 17 | Romania (ROM) | 0 | 1 | 0 | 1 |
| 20 | Canada (CAN) | 0 | 0 | 1 | 1 |
| 20 | Germany (GER) | 0 | 0 | 1 | 1 |
| Totals (21 entries) | | 51 | 51 | 51 | 153 |

=== Sports ===
- Alpine skiing (10)
- Biathlon (6)
- Cross-country skiing (8)
- Figure skating (4)
- Ice hockey (1)
- Nordic combined (1)
- Short track speed skating (10)
- Ski jumping (3)
- Speed skating (10)

== See also ==
- 1999 Asian Winter Games
