= Tennis at the 2005 Summer Universiade =

Tennis events were contested at the 2005 Summer Universiade in İzmir, Turkey.

== Medal summary ==
Event	Gold	Silver	Bronze
Men's Singles	Artem Sitak (RUS)	Evgeny Kirillov (RUS)	Sébastien Kosak (FRA)
Men's Singles	Artem Sitak (RUS)	Evgeny Kirillov (RUS)	Jimmy Wang (TPE)
Men's Doubles	Artem Sitak and Dmitri Sitak (RUS)	Nikola Ćirić and Darko Mađarovski (SCG)	Radosław Nijaki and Filip Urban (POL)
Men's Doubles	Artem Sitak and Dmitri Sitak (RUS)	Nikola Ćirić and Darko Mađarovski (SCG)	Viktor Bruthans and Peter Miklušičák (SVK)
Women's Singles	Eva Hrdinová (CZE)	Cho Yoon-jeong (KOR)	Chan Chin-wei (TPE)
Women's Singles	Eva Hrdinová (CZE)	Cho Yoon-jeong (KOR)	Hsieh Su-wei (TPE)
Women's Doubles	Chuang Chia-jung and Hsieh Su-wei (TPE)	Katarína Bašternáková and Stanislava Hrozenská (SVK)	Tomoko Dokei and Junri Namigata (JPN)
Women's Doubles	Chuang Chia-jung and Hsieh Su-wei (TPE)	Katarína Bašternáková and Stanislava Hrozenská (SVK)	Lorena Arias and Marcela Arroyo (MEX)
Mixed Doubles	Chuang Chia-jung and Chen Ti (TPE)	Lorena Arias and Víctor Romero (MEX)	Tomoko Dokei and Joji Miyao (JPN)
Mixed Doubles	Chuang Chia-jung and Chen Ti (TPE)	Lorena Arias and Víctor Romero (MEX)	Stanislava Hrozenská and Viktor Bruthans (SVK)

== Medal table ==
Rank	Nation	Gold	Silver	Bronze	Total
1	Russia (RUS)	2	1	0	3
2	Chinese Taipei (TPE)	2	0	3	5
3	Czech Republic (CZE)	1	0	0	1
4	Slovakia (SVK)	0	1	2	3
5	Mexico (MEX)	0	1	1	2
6	Serbia and Montenegro (SCG)	0	1	0	1
6	South Korea (KOR)	0	1	0	1
8	Japan (JPN)	0	0	2	2
9	France (FRA)	0	0	1	1
9	Poland (POL)	0	0	1	1
Totals (10 entries)		5	5	10	20

== See also ==
- Tennis at the Summer Universiade
