= List of ski areas and resorts in South Korea =

This is a list of ski areas and resorts in South Korea. The list includes closed ski areas and resorts which are maintaining its facilities. Dismantled ski areas and resorts are not listed.

== Gangwon-do ==
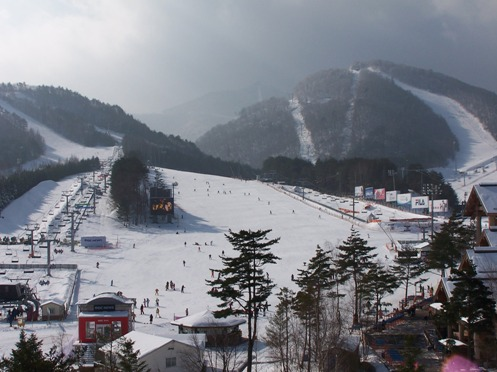
Yongpyong Resort

- Alpensia
- Alps Resort – closed
- Elysian Gangchon
- High1
- Jeongseon Alpine Centre – closed
- Oak Valley
- O_{2} Resort
- Phoenix Pyeongchang
- Vivaldi Park
- Welli Hilli Park
- Yongpyong Resort

== Gyeonggi-do ==
- Bears Town – closed
- Jisan Forest Resort
- Konjiam Resort
- Star Hill Resort – closed
- Yangji Pine Resort – temporarily closed

== Other regions ==
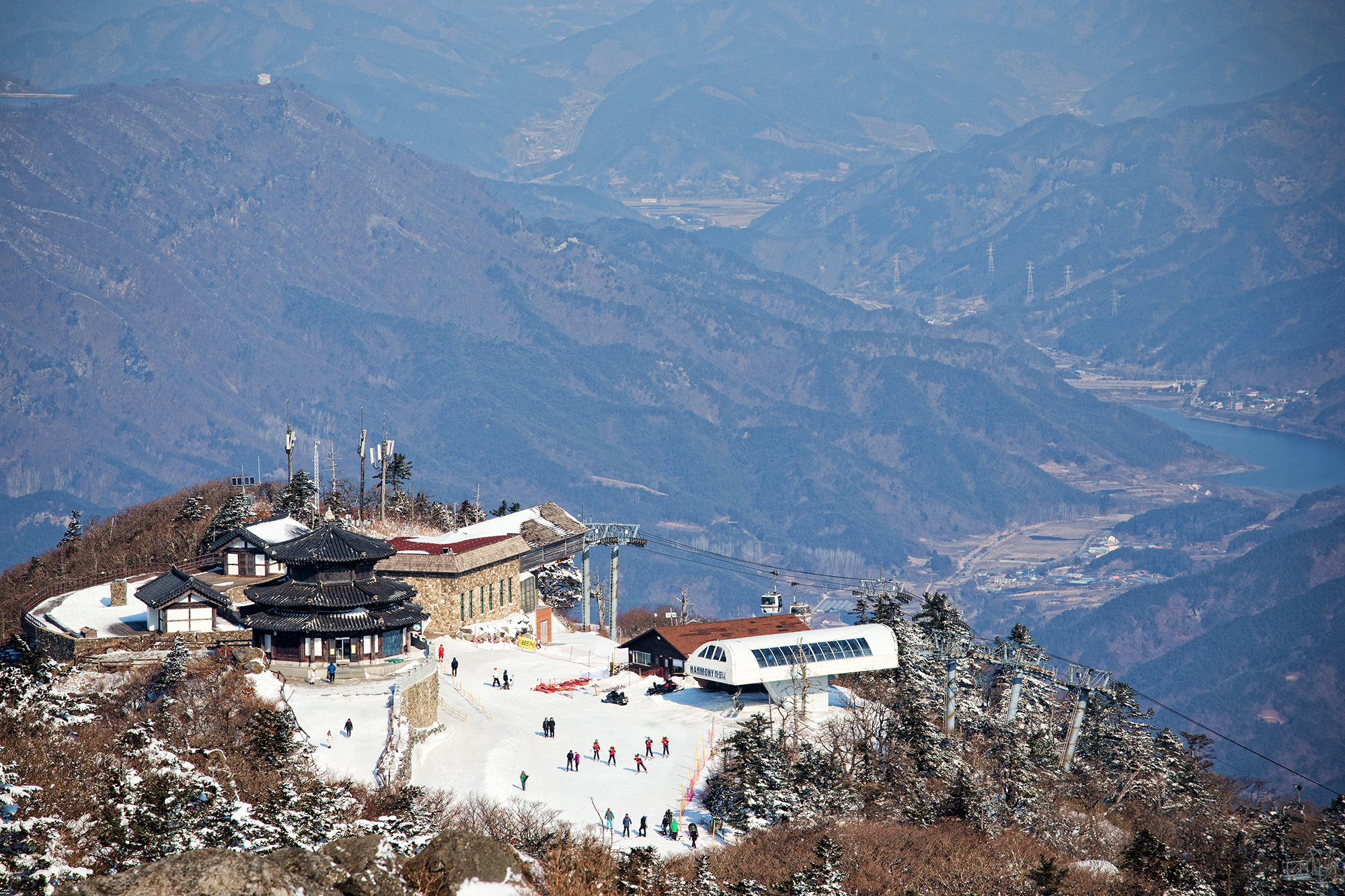
Muju Resort

=== Jeollabuk-do ===
- Muju Resort

=== Gyeongsangnam-do ===
- Eden Valley Resort

== See also ==
- List of ski areas and resorts
- List of ski areas and resorts in Japan
