= Sabuk-eup =

- Town
- Location of Pyeongchang-eup in South Korea
- Coordinates: 37°13′39.32″N 128°49′16.39″E
- Country: South Korea
- Province: Gangwon
- County: Jeongseon
- Administrative divisions: 15 ri

Area
  - Total: 47.1 km^{2} (18.2 sq mi)

Population (2015)
  - Total: 5,425
  - Density: 115/km^{2} (298/sq mi)
- Time zone: UTC+9 (Korea Standard Time)

Korean name
- Hangul: 사북읍
- Hanja: 舍北邑
- RR: Sabuk-eup
- MR: Sabuk-ŭp

Sabuk-eup (Korean: 사북읍) is a town in Jeongseon, South Korea. The town has a surface area of 47.1 km^{2} (18.2 sq mi) and a population of 5,425.
