= 1999 Winter Universiade =

Multi-sport event in Poprad Tatry, Slovakia

XIX Winter Universiade XIX. Zimná univerziáda
- Host city: Poprad Tatry, Slovakia
- Events: 8 sports
- Opening: January 22, 1999
- Closing: January 30, 1999
- Opened by: Rudolf Schuster

The 1999 Winter Universiade, the XIX Winter Universiade, took place in Poprad Tatry, Slovakia between January 22 and January 30.

== Medal table ==
* Host nation (Slovakia)

Rank	Nation	Gold	Silver	Bronze	Total
1	Russia (RUS)	8	11	10	29
2	Austria (AUT)	7	3	1	11
3	Poland (POL)	5	3	3	11
4	Slovakia (SVK)*	4	7	8	19
5	Japan (JPN)	4	4	7	15
6	Italy (ITA)	4	0	2	6
7	France (FRA)	4	0	1	5
8	China (CHN)	3	5	6	14
9	Sweden (SWE)	3	2	3	8
10	Ukraine (UKR)	3	1	2	6
11	Bulgaria (BUL)	3	0	1	4
12	Belarus (BLR)	2	2	3	7
13	Canada (CAN)	1	2	1	4
13	Germany (GER)	1	2	1	4
15	Switzerland (SUI)	0	3	0	3
16	Czech Republic (CZE)	0	2	1	3
17	United States (USA)	0	2	0	2
18	Slovenia (SLO)	0	1	2	3
19	Belgium (BEL)	0	1	0	1
19	Spain (ESP)	0	1	0	1
Totals (20 entries)		52	52	52	156

=== Sports ===
- Alpine skiing (10)
- Biathlon (8)
- Cross-country skiing (8)
- Figure skating (4)
- Ice hockey (1)
- Nordic combined (2)
- Short track speed skating (10)
- Ski jumping (3)
- Snowboarding (6)
