= Muju County =

Coordinates: 36°00′25″N 127°39′38″E

Muju
- County
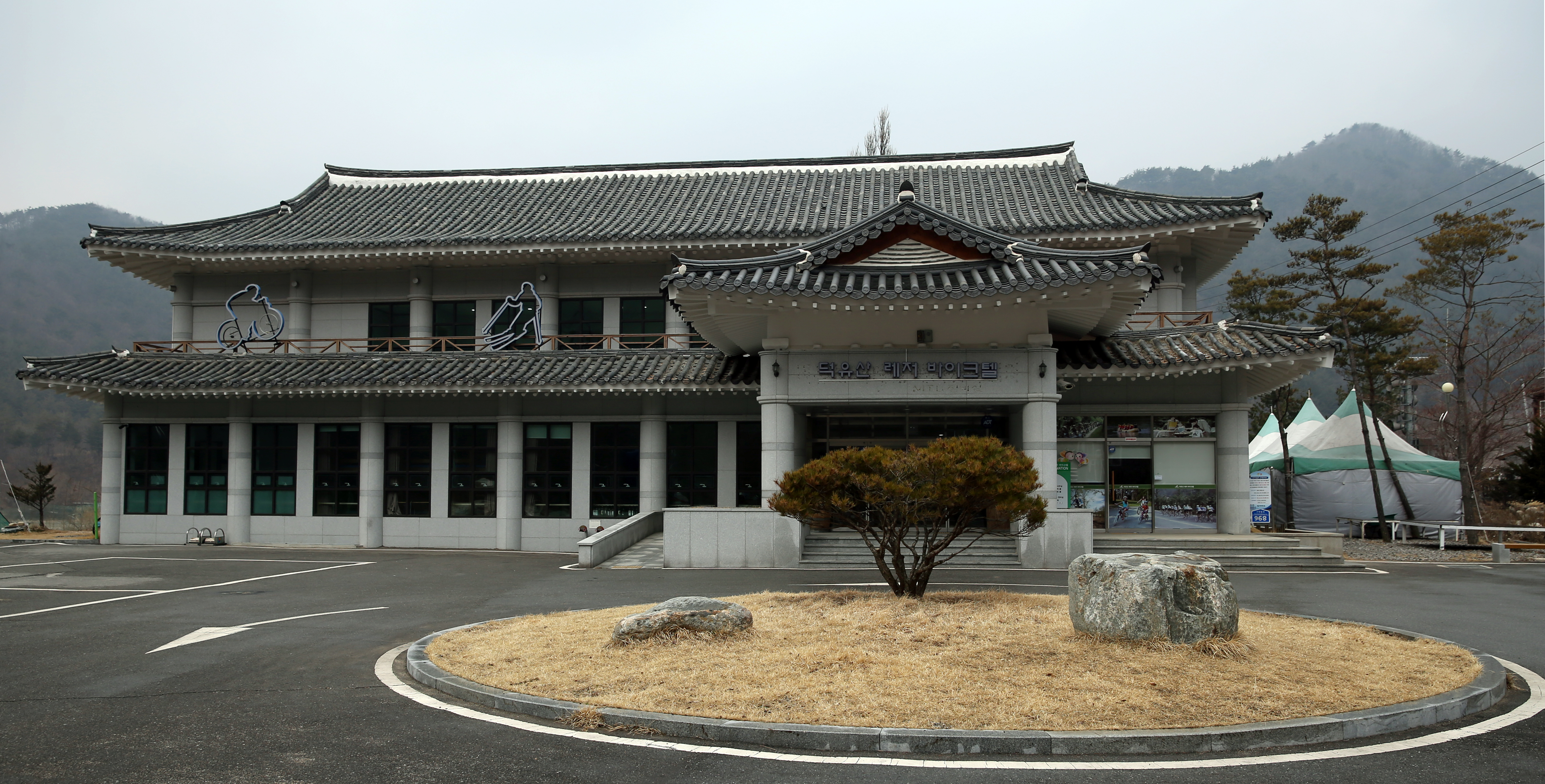
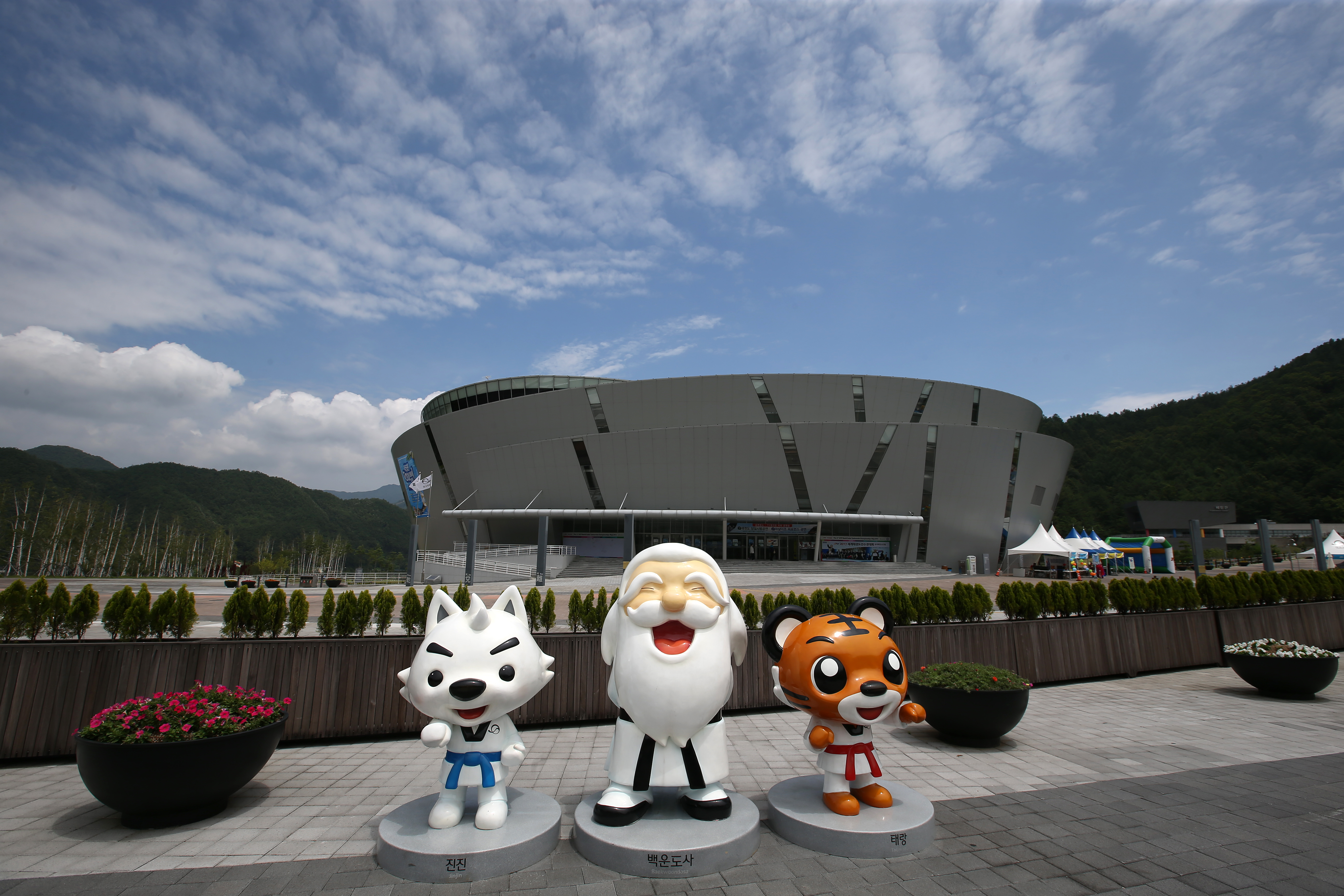
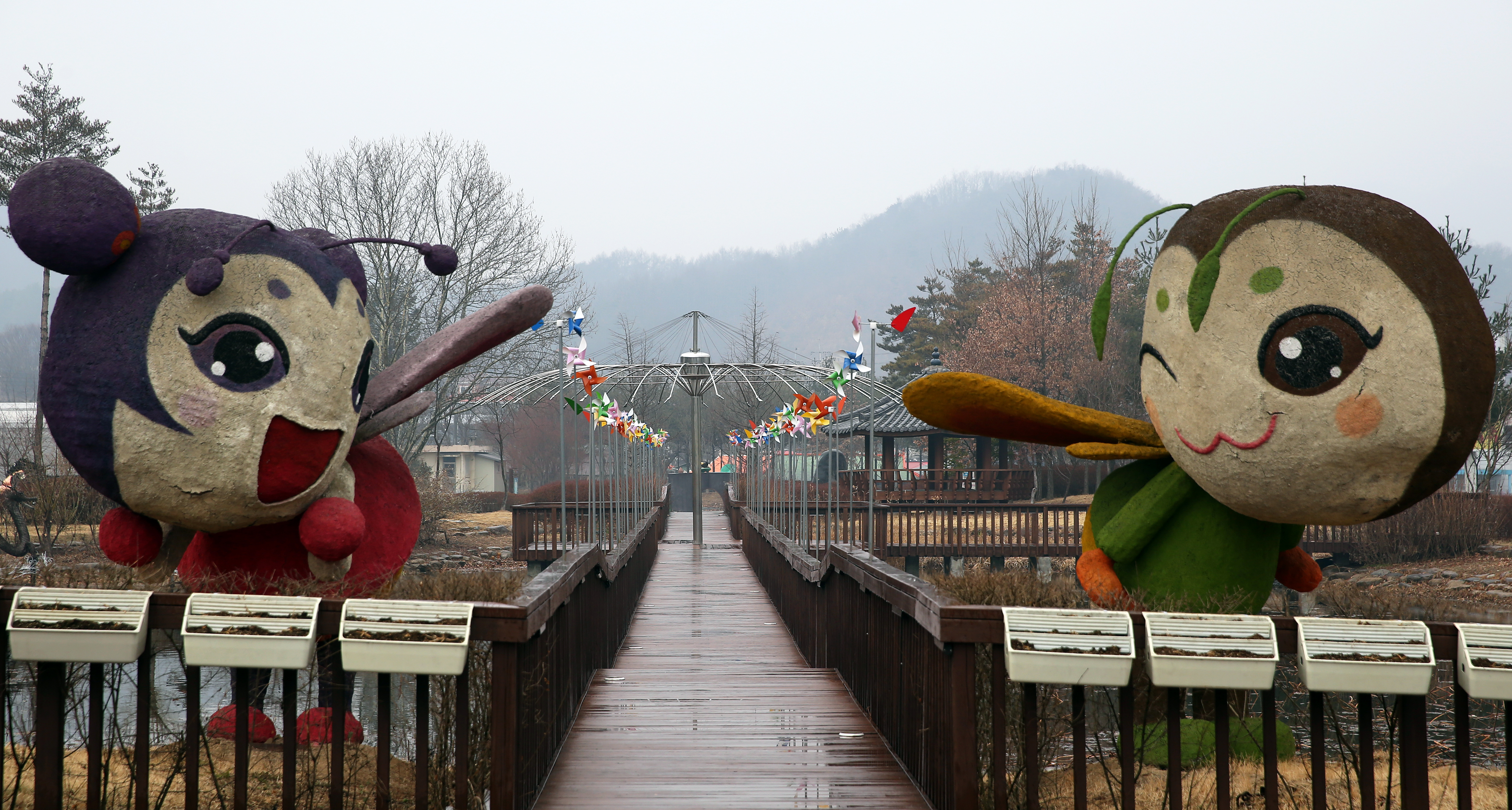
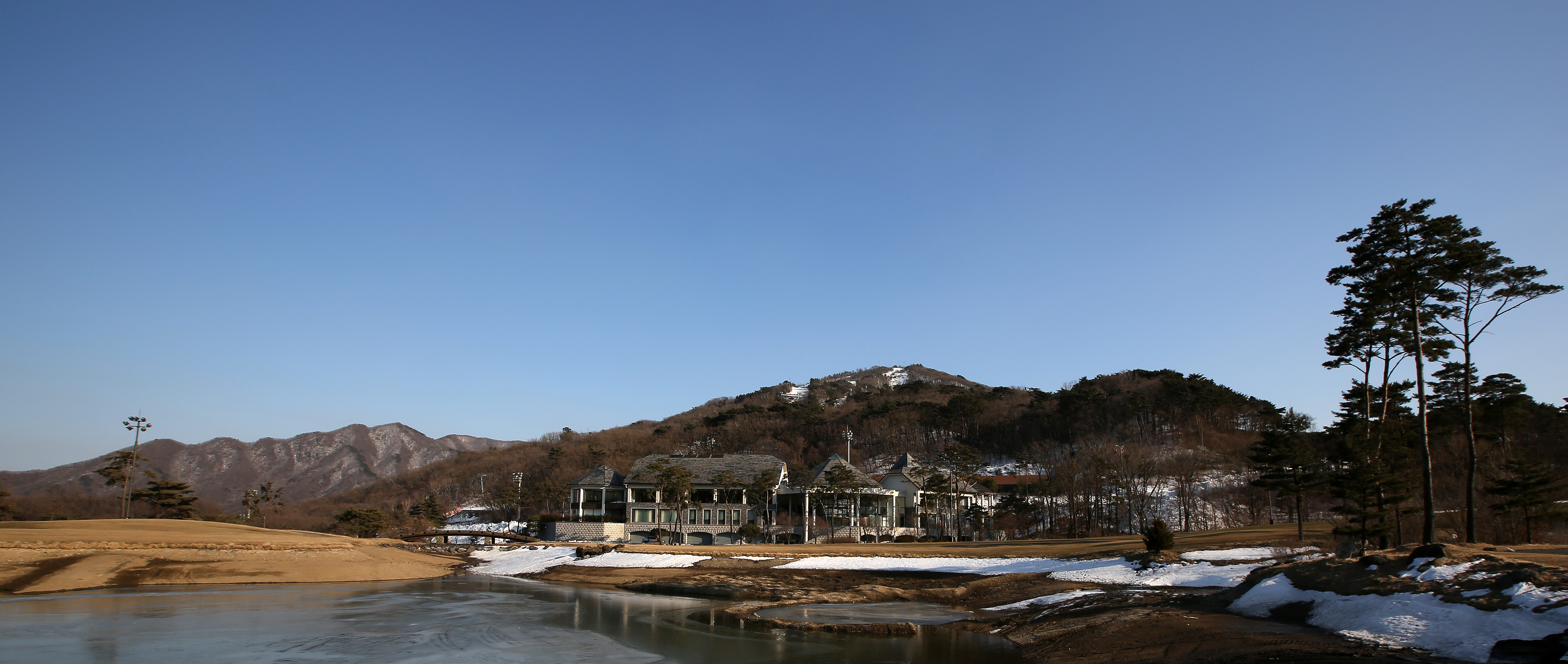
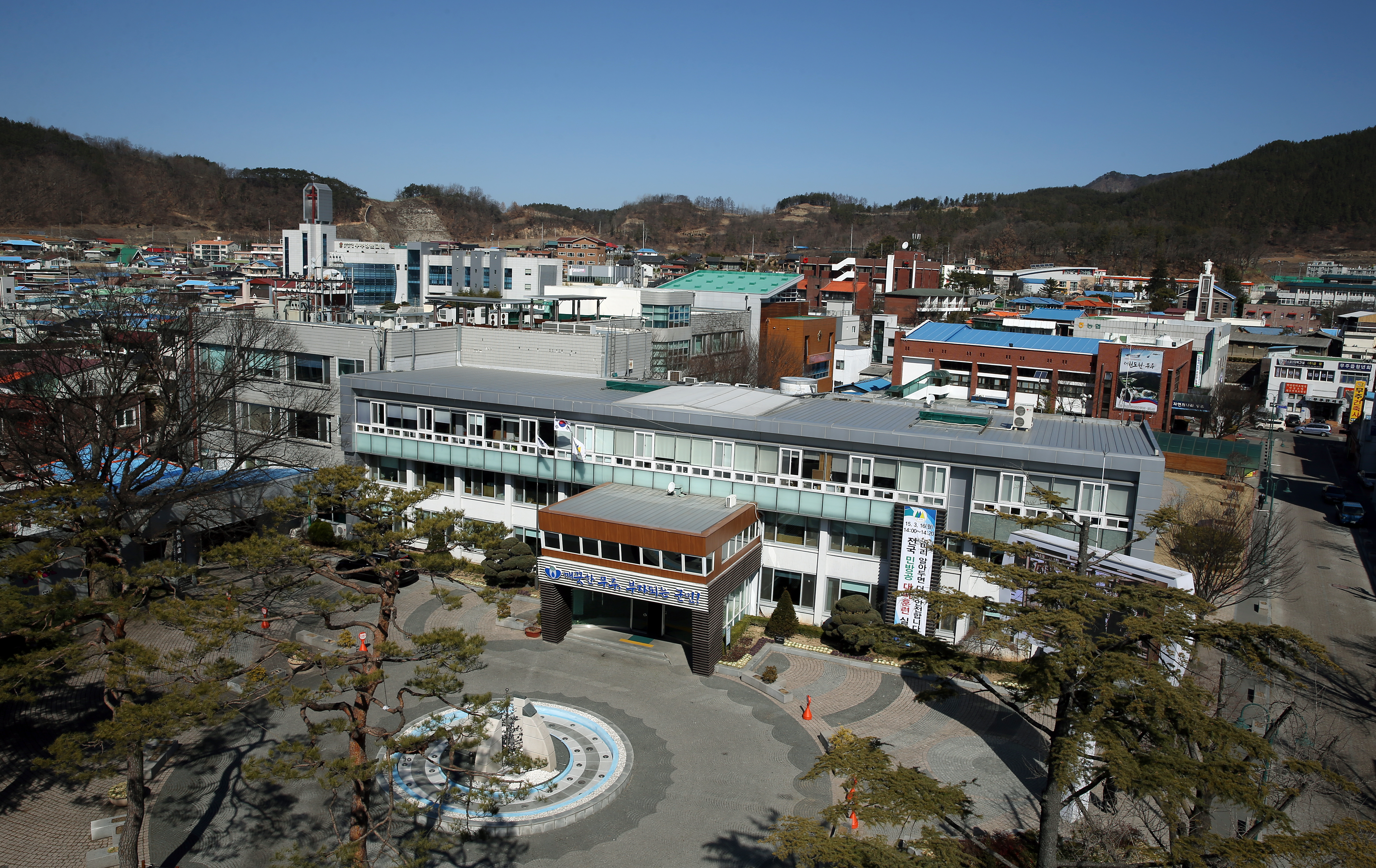
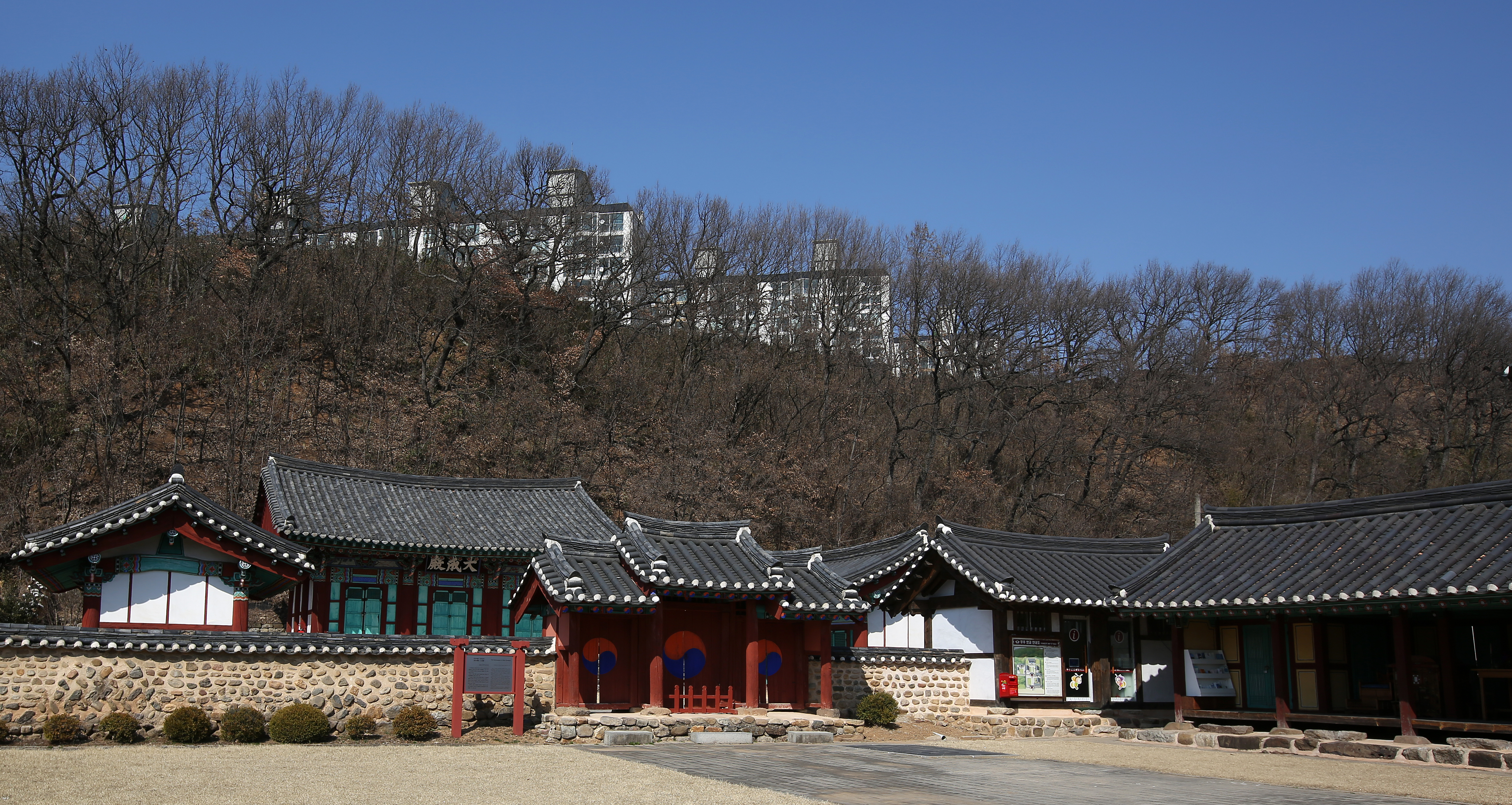

- Flag Emblem of Muju

- Location in South Korea
- Country: South Korea
- State: Jeonbuk
- Administrative divisions: 1 eup, 5 myeon

Area
  - Total: 631.8 km^{2} (243.9 sq mi)

Population (September 2024)
  - Total: 23,101
  - Density: 38/km^{2} (98/sq mi)
  - Dialect: Jeolla

Korean name
- Hangul: 무주군
- Hanja: 茂朱郡
- RR: Muju-gun
- MR: Muju-gun

Muju County (Korean: 무주군), is a county in North Jeolla Province (Jeollabuk-do), South Korea. Muju is known for its Muju Firefly Festival and is a tourist area.

== History ==
During the era of the Three Kingdoms of Korea, Mupung (the present name) in Byeonjin belonged to Silla and was called Musanhyeon, and Jugye area (current Muju-eup) in Mahan belonged to Baekje and was called Jeokcheonhyeon. It is known that Musan was renamed as Mupung and Jeokcheon as Dancheon after the Era of Unified Silla (668~917).

After Goryeo (918~1392) was founded, Mupung did not change its name whereas Dancheon was renamed as Jugye, and as Joseon rearranged administrative districts in 1414 (the 14th year of Taejong), Mupung and Jugye were incorporated into one district.

It was named as Muju through the combination of the first letters of the two areas, Mupung and Jugye, after they were incorporated into one administrative district.

== Geography ==
Muju-gun is situated near four provinces, including Chungbuk, Chungnam, Gyeongbuk and Gyeongnam. Historically and geographically, the area has served as a transitional ground between the east and west part of the southern peninsula and is a site for cultural exchange. It is located in the central part of the country.

== Climate ==
Muju has a humid continental climate (Köppen: Dwa), but can be considered a borderline humid subtropical climate (Köppen: Cwa) using the −3 °C (27 °F) isotherm. It has a mountainous climate in which temperature is drastically different in the day and at night. Annual average temperature is 10.8 °C, and the highest temperature of the year is 35 °C and the lowest -17 °C. Annual average precipitation is 1,251 mm, and Namdae Stream, a branch stream of Geum River, is flowing through Muju-eup.

== Countyscape ==
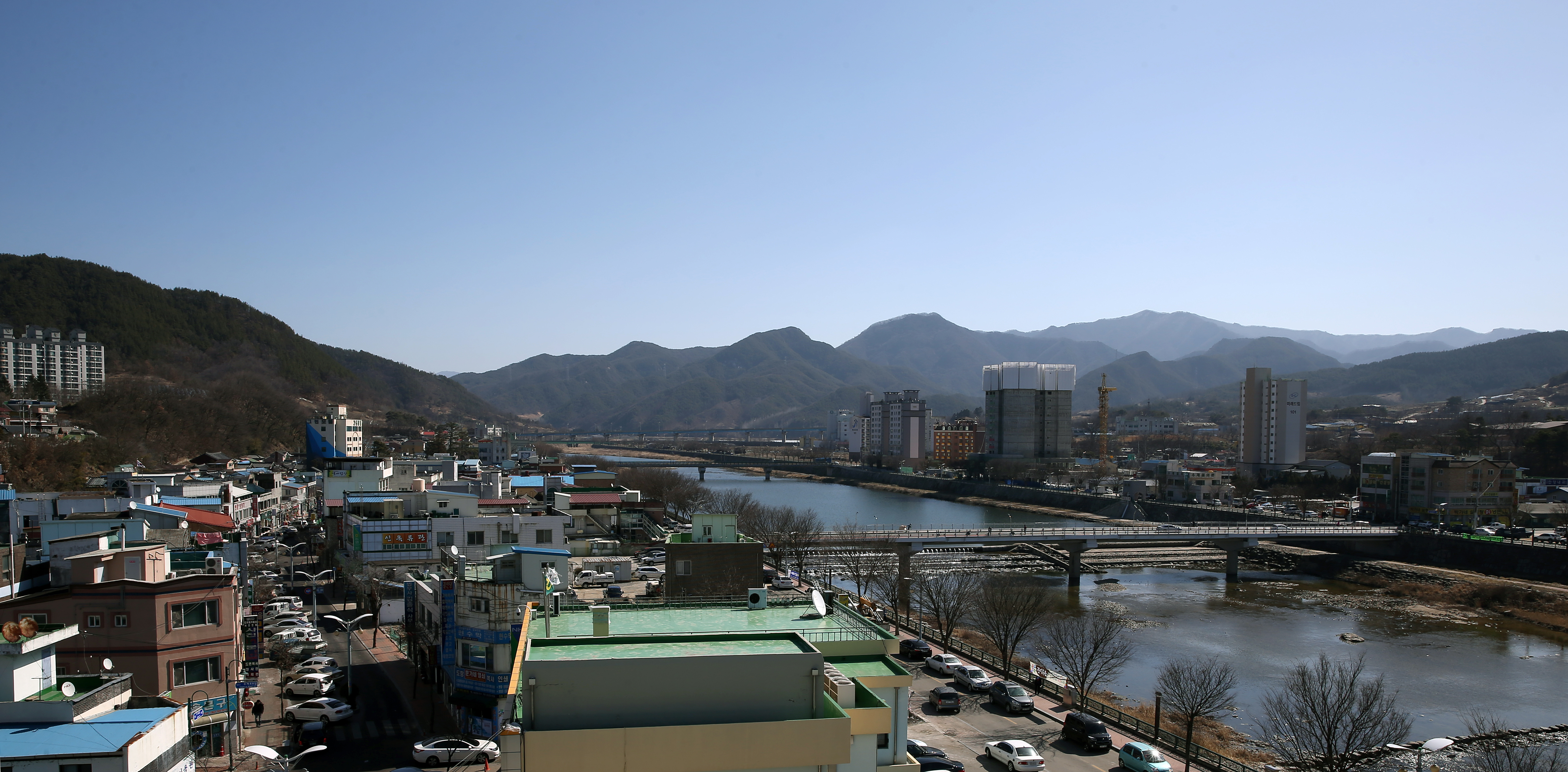
Muju

In the spring, Gucheon-dong Cherry Blossom Road starting at Rajetongmun located in Seolcheon-myeon is notable for its scenery along with the royal azaleas that line a 28-km-long road in Deokyu Mountain.

Clean fresh water in Gucheon-dong is popular in the summer. Rafting is available in the Geum River, and there are sandy beaches.

Maple leaves at Deokyu Mountain (National Park) and Jeoksang Mountain can be seen during the fall. In particular, Jeoksang Mountain that is cited as one of the 100 most beautiful views in Korea is blessed with Gibong Summit, Hyangrobong Summit, Cheonil Fall, Jangdo Rock, Janggun Rock and Anryeomdae. In addition, Yangsu Power Generator at the summit, a mountaintop lake and historic sites as Jeoksang Sanseong and Anguksa Temple.

== Economy ==
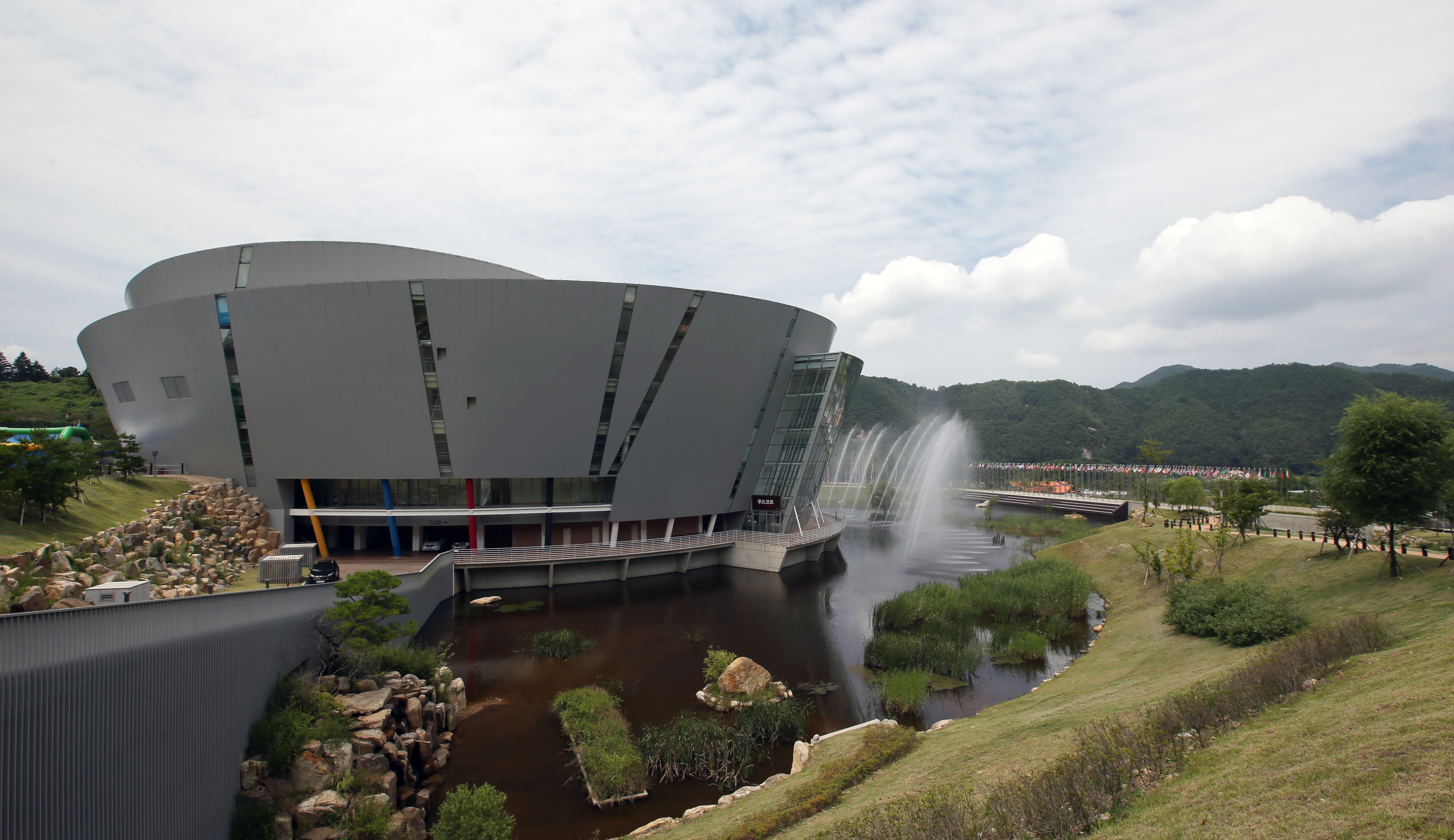
Taekwondo Park in Muju

Service and other industries take up about 50 percent of the industrial structure of North Jeolla Province, while the remainder is taken up by the order of mining, manufacture, agriculture, forestry, fishery, construction, electric and gas industries. For the industrial structure of Muju-gun, primary industry accounts for 52%, secondary industries 2%, and tertiary industries 46%. Upon construction of the Taekwondo Park, tourism, leisure and enterprise city, and Danone Co Ltd's Muju plant, the industrial structure of Muju underwent a dramatic transformation.

== Transportation ==
=== Highways and National roads ===
Highway #35, which connects Daejeon Metropolitan City and Tongyeong, Gyeongnam, goes through Muju-gun, as well as National Road #19, #30 and #37. Located at the center of Korea, Muju-gun has an excellent transportation system. From downtown Muju, it takes about four hours to Seoul, an hour to Daejeon Metropolitan City, an hour and fifty minutes to Daegu Metropolitan City, an hour to Jeonju, two hours and ten minutes to Gwangju Metropolitan City and three hours to Busan. (Destination based on the city halls of each city).

=== Railroad ===
Currently, there is no railroad directly passing through Muju-gun. However, the government plans to construct a railroad connecting Saemangeum (west coast of North Jeolla Province) and Gimcheon through Muju-gun. In addition, as other railroads pass through the background area of Muju-gun, including Daejeon Metropolitan City and the Yeongdong region of North Chungcheong Province, Muju-gun is readily accessible via these railroads. From Deokyusan I.C., it takes about fifty minutes (66 km) through Highway #35 to reach Daejeon station, where the high-speed KTX, general train service and freight train service are available. It takes about fifty minutes (50 km) via Highway #35 and National Road #19 to reach Yeongdong station in Chungbuk, where both general and freight train service are available.

=== Air ===
From downtown Muju, it takes about three hours (283 km) to reach Incheon International Airport, two hours (156 km) to Daegu International Airport and two hours (165 km) to Gwangju International Airport.

=== Sea ===
From downtown Muju, it takes about two hours to Gunsan Port in Gunsan, Jeonbuk, and two hours and forty minutes to Busan Port.

== Tourism ==
Since December 2006, Muju-gun has been visited by as many as 4.2 million persons, and the number of visitors is increasing every year.

=== Firefly Festival ===
Muju Firefly Festival is a Korea's representative environmental festival held on the theme of Firefly, Natural Treasure No. 322, every June. Firefly is an environment indicator insect that lives only in the clean environment, and Muju-gun is raising awareness about the seriousness of environmental contamination that is getting worse by linking firefly to a festival. Since 1997 when the festival was initiated, it was selected as Korea's excellent festival for 11 years in a row.

=== Taekwondo Park ===
The construction of Taekwondo Park that is expected to grow into the sacred ground for 70 million Taekwondo lovers in 188 countries will be initiated on Taekwondo Day, September 4, 2009, and completed in 2013. The park established in area covering 2,314,049 m^{2} will include Taekwondo Stadium, Exhibition Hall, Experience Hall and Accommodations. Currently, an observatory is established in the site of Taekwondo Park in Seolcheon-myeon, Muju-gun drawing Taekwondo lovers and tourists all across the world.

- World taekwondo expo took place in Muju and Jeonju area in July, 2008.

=== Bandi Land Insect Museum ===
Bandi Land established in a habitat of firefly in Seolcheon-myeon, Muju-gun includes Insect Museum, School of the Nature, Youth Camp and Natural Resort Forests providing many tourists with an opportunity to experience the mystery of the nature. At the entrance of Insect Museum, representative fossils ranging from the paleozoic era to the Cenozoic era were restored to help appreciate the ancient mystery of the nature, and specimens of 13,500 rare insects of 2,000 species including fireflies are exhibited in the Insect Hall and 150 tropical plants are on display in Botanical Hall.

It also includes the Korea's largest insect specimens and a 3D movie theater equipped with Dome Screen in addition to an ecological restoration site, insect trees and a natural history site helping families appreciate and experience the preciousness of the nature.

=== Bandi Observatory ===
Bandi Observatory, a 3-story building established in area covering 752 m^{2}, is located in Bandi Land and equipped with Exhibition Room, Video Room and Observation Room. It is also equipped with 13 small telescopes including a 305mm RC Telescope enabling visitors to experience telescopes, and the Korea's first 800mm satellite tracking and monitoring telescope enables visitors to observe planets including the Sun, nebula and a cluster of stars.

=== Mt. Deokyu National Park ===
Deokyu Mountain is one of the 12 most beautiful mountains in Korea and centers around Hyangjeok Summit that stands 1,614m above the sea level. Deokyu Summits that starts at Sambong Mountain in Mupung and reaches South Deokyu creates a 40 km-long ridge dividing Youngnam Area and Honam Area. Crystal water flows from the Hyangjeok Summit to create the 33 most beautiful sceneries in Gucheon-dong in addition to Muju Resort in Buksa-myeon and Chilyeon Valley in the southwest attracting a lot of visitors. The valleys of the mountain are filled with red royal azaleas in the spring, and green forests draw visitors in the summer. Red autumn leaves tint the mountain in the fall, and there is snow in the winter.

=== Mt. Jeoksang ===
Jeoksang Mountain, surrounded with rocky cliffs, is known for its autumn leaves. Jeoksang which means a red skirt stemmed from its autumn leaves. It stands 1,034m above the sea level and has a summit lake for the Yangsu Power Generator and historic sites including Jeoksangsanseong (Jeollabuk-do Regional Monument No. 88) and Anguksa Temple.

=== Muju Deogyusan Resort ===
Less than a 3-hour drive from Incheon International airport, Muju Deogyusan Resort is a mountain resort in Korea that is 688 hectares (1,700 acres) in area and located in Mt. Deokyu National Park. Muju Deogyusan Resort claims to be a four-season resort, and it is known in Korea chiefly for its ski area.

== Muju Film Festival ==
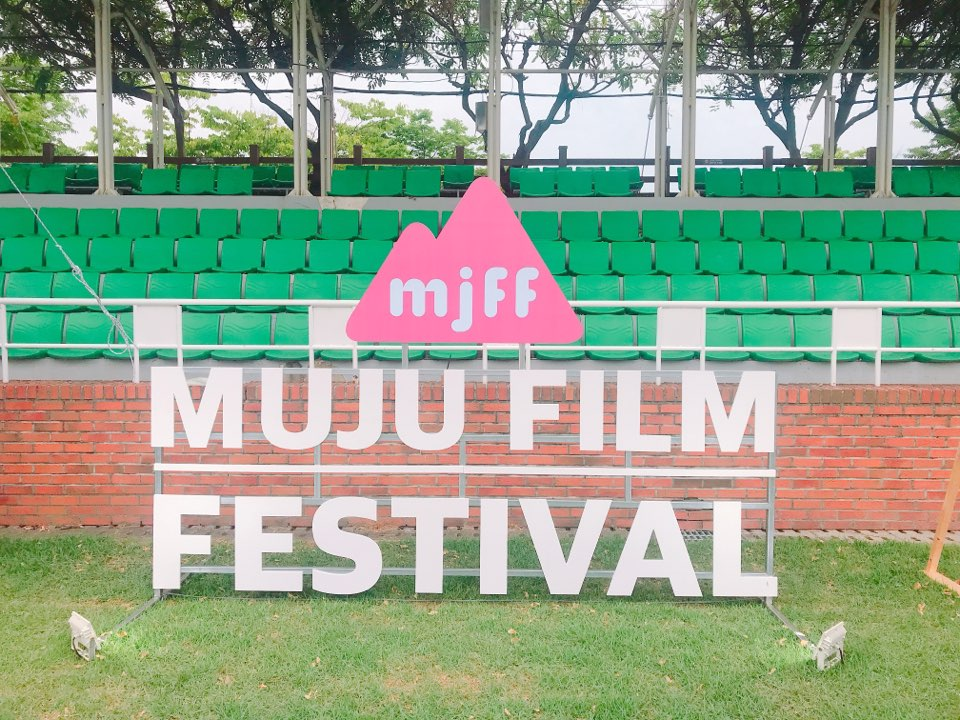
Muju Film Festival in 2018
