= Lithuania at the 2011 Summer Universiade =

- IOC code: LTU

in Shenzhen
- Competitors: 90 in 10 sports
- Flag bearer: Rytis Sakalauskas (opening)
- Medals Ranked 13thth: Gold 5 Silver 5 Bronze 3 Total 13

Summer Universiade appearances
- 1959; 1961; 1963; 1965; 1967; 1970; 1973; 1975; 1977; 1979; 1981; 1983; 1985; 1987; 1989; 1991; 1993; 1995; 1997; 1999; 2001; 2003; 2005; 2007; 2009; 2011; 2013; 2015; 2017; 2019; 2021; 2025; 2027

Lithuania competed at the 2011 Summer Universiade in Shenzhen, China.

== Medalists ==
Medal	Name	Sport	Event
Gold	Vilma Rimšaitė	Cycling	Women's BMX
Gold	Giedrius Titenis	Swimming	Men's 200 m breaststroke
Gold	Giedrius Titenis	Swimming	Men's 100 m breaststroke
Gold	Vilija Sereikaitė	Cycling	Women's individual pursuit
Gold	Eglė Zablockytė; Aušrinė Trebaitė; Aleksandra Sošenko	Cycling	Women's team time trial
Silver	Aurimas Didžbalis	Weightlifting	Men's 94 kg
Silver	Rytis Sakalauskas	Athletics	Men's 100 m
Silver	Zinaida Sendriūtė	Athletics	Women's Discus throw
Silver	Viktorija Žemaitytė	Athletics	Women's Heptathlon
Silver	Airinė Palšytė	Athletics	Women's High jump
Bronze	Tautvydas Biknius	Cycling	Men's BMX
Bronze	Lina Grinčikaitė	Athletics	Women's 100 m
Bronze	National Men universiade Team	Basketball	Men's tournament

=== Medals by sport ===
Sport	Gold	Silver	Bronze	Total
Cycling	3	0	1	4
Swimming	2	0	0	2
Athletics	0	4	1	5
Weightlifting	0	1	0	1
Basketball	0	0	1	1
Totals (5 entries)	5	5	3	13

== Athletics ==
Lithuania was represented by 27 athletes.

Men

Athlete	Events	Heat 1		Heat 2		Semifinal		Final	
Athlete	Events	Result	Rank	Result	Rank	Result	Rank	Result	Rank
Rytis Sakalauskas	100 m	10.38	4thQ	10.32	4thQ	10.23	2ndQ	10.14 NR	Silver
Martynas Jurgilas	100 m	10.59	21stQ	10.47	17th	Did not advance			
Aivaras Pranckevičius	200 m	21.42	17thQ	21.41	22nd	Did not advance			
Egidijus Dilys	200 m	21.20	9thQ	21.23	16thq	21.30	14th	Did not advance	
Vitalij Kozlov	800 m	1:49.74	4thQ			1:48.49	14th	Did not advance	
Mantas Šilkauskas	110 m hurdles	14.19	20thq			Did not start			
Silvestras Guogis	400 m hurdles	51.65	15thq			51.32	18th	Did not advance	
Mantas Dilys	Triple jump	15.88	17th					Did not advance	
Raivydas Stanys	High jump	2.20	4thq					2.24	5th
Darius Aučyna	Long jump	7.66	11thq					7.76	8th
Povilas Mykolaitis	Long jump	7.53	18th					Did not advance	
Andrius Gudžius	Discus Throw	56.59	13th					Did not advance	
Marius Žiūkas	20 km walk							1:26:30	6th
Ričardas Rekstas	20 km walk							1:33:43	21st
Ričardas Rekstas	20 km walk							1:33:43	21st
Egidijus Dilys; Rytis Sakalauskas; Martas Skrabulis; Martynas Jurgilas	4 × 100 m relay	40.05	6th					Disqualified	

Women

Athlete	Events	Heat 1		Heat 2		Semifinal		Final	
Athlete	Events	Result	Rank	Result	Rank	Result	Rank	Result	Rank
Lina Grinčikaitė	100 m	11.46	2ndQ	11.43	2ndQ	11.52	6thQ	11.44	Bronze
Silva Pesackaitė	100 m	12.20	42nd	Did not advance					
Silva Pesackaitė	200 m	24.51	31stq	Did not start					
Silvestra Malinauskaitė	200 m	24.87	21stq	25.12	30th	Did not advance			
Agnė Orlauskaitė	400 m	54.46	16thQ			54.51	17th	Did not advance	
Eglė Balčiūnaitė	800 m	2:04.97	11thQ			2:05.21	10thQ	2:01.68	4th
Vaida Žūsinaitė	5000 m	16:54.28	12thq					16:53.15	11th
Vaida Žūsinaitė	10,000 m							36:35.30	9th
Sonata Tamošaitytė	100 m hurdles	13.40	11thQ			13.37	11th	Did not advance	
Airinė Palšytė	High jump	1.80	q					1.96 =NR	Silver
Lina Andrijauskaitė	Long jump	5.93	21st					Did not advance	
Zinaida Sendriūtė	Discus throw							62.49	Silver
Viktorija Žemaitytė	Women's Heptathlon							5958 pts	Silver
Silva Pesackaitė; Agnė Orlauskaitė; Sonata Tamošaitytė; Lina Grinčikaitė	4 × 100 m relay	Disqualified							

== Badminton ==
- Kęstutis Navickas

== Basketball ==
Lithuania has qualified both a men's and a women's team.

== Cycling ==
BMX

Athlete	Event	1.1		1.2		1.3		Final	
Athlete	Event	Time	Rank	Time	Rank	Time	Rank	Time	Rank
Vilma Rimšaitė	Women's BMX		1st		1st		1st	37.400	Gold
Tautvydas Biknius	Men's BMX							32.731	Bronze
Arminas Kazlauskis	Men's BMX							34.365	4th

Mountain

Athlete(s)	Event	Result	
Athlete(s)	Event	Time	Rank
Tatjana Kaliakina	Women's cross-country	1:29:11	4th

Road

Athlete(s)	Event	Result	
Athlete(s)	Event	Time	Rank
Martynas Maniusis	Men's 160 km road race	3:52:16	8th
Vismantas Mockevičius	Men's 160 km road race	3:52.3	24th
Audrius Žemaitaitis	Men's 160 km road race	DNF	–
Vladimiras Kokorevas	Men's 160 km road race	DNF	–
Aleksandra Sošenko	Women's 120 km road race	3:31:4	6th
Vaida Pikauskaitė	Women's 120 km road race	3:31:4	11th
Eglė Zablockytė	Women's 120 km road race	3:31:59	18th
Aušrinė Trebaitė	Women's 120 km road race	DNS	–
Vilija Sereikaitė	Women's 120 km road race	DNS	–

Track

Athlete	Event	Preliminary		Round 1		Final	
Athlete	Event	Time	Rank	Time	Rank	Time	Rank
Vismantas Mockevičius	Men's individual pursuit	Did not start					
Aušrinė Trebaitė	Women's individual pursuit	3:48.455	5thQ	3:45.788	5th	Did not advance	
Vilija Sereikaitė	Women's individual pursuit	3:37.807 UR	1stQ	3:37.683 UR	1stQ	3:36.944	Gold

== Gymnastics ==
Lithuania was represented by 2 gymnasts:

- Jevgenij Izmodenov
- Vladislav Esaulov

== Sailing ==
Lithuania was represented by 2 sailors.

- Juozas Bernotas (RS:X)
- Aušra Milevičiūtė (Laser Radial)

== Shooting ==
Lithuania was represented by 4 shooters.

== Swimming ==
Men

Athlete	Event	Preliminary		Final	
Athlete	Event	Time	Rank	Time	Rank
Giedrius Titenis	50 m breaststroke	28.30	11th	Did not advance	
Giedrius Titenis	100 m breaststroke	1:01.18	2ndQ	1:00.39	Gold
Giedrius Titenis	200 m breaststroke	2:11.71	1stQ	2:10.85	Gold
Mindaugas Sadauskas	50 m freestyle	22.96	10th	Did not advance	
Mindaugas Sadauskas	100 m freestyle	49.82	5thQ	50.14	8th
Mindaugas Sadauskas	50 m butterfly	24.78	16th	Did not advance	
Edgaras Štura	50 m butterfly	25.78	36th	Did not advance	
Edgaras Štura	100 m butterfly	55.39	30th	Did not advance	
Edgaras Štura	200 m butterfly	2:03.01	28th	Did not advance	
Simas Jarašūnas	50 m breaststroke	30.01	35th	Did not advance	
Simas Jarašūnas	100 m breaststroke	1:06.17	35th	Did not advance	
Simas Jarašūnas	200 m breaststroke	2:25.54	28th	Did not advance	
Edvinas Apčinikovas	100 m freestyle	52.85	40th	Did not advance	
Giedrius Andriunaitis	50 m freestyle	24.33	39th	Did not advance	

Women

Athlete	Event	Preliminary		Final	
Athlete	Event	Time	Rank	Time	Rank
Rugilė Mileišytė	50 m freestyle	27.14	30th	Did not advance	
Rugilė Mileišytė	100 m freestyle	58.01	29th	Did not advance	
Rugilė Mileišytė	100 m backstroke	30.36	23rd	Did not advance	
Erika Bespalko	50 m breaststroke	33.79	23rd	Did not advance	
Erika Bespalko	200 m breaststroke	1:12.58	22nd	Did not advance	
Erika Bespalko	200 m breaststroke	2:37.30	20th	Did not advance	
Erika Bespalko	200 m individual medley	2:26.61	28th	Did not advance	

== Taekwondo ==
Lithuania was represented by one athlete.

== Weightlifting ==
Lithuania was represented by 8 athletes.

Athlete	Event	Snatch		Clean & jerk		Total	Rank
Athlete	Event	Result	Rank	Result	Rank	Total	Rank
Marius Mickevičius	85 kg	153 kg		176 kg		329 kg	12th
Sergėjus Smirnovas	85 kg	137 kg		161 kg		298 kg	15th
Arnas Sidiskis	94 kg	140 kg		170 kg		310 kg	14th
Aurimas Didžbalis	94 kg	180 kg		207 kg		387 kg	Silver
