= Cycling at the Summer World University Games =

Cycling competitions at the Summer Universiades

- Events: 16 (men: 8; women: 8)

Games
- 1959; 1960; 1961; 1962; 1963; 1964; 1965; 1966; 1967; 1968; 1970; 1970; 1973; 1972; 1975; 1975; 1977; 1978; 1979; 1981; 1983; 1985; 1987; 1989; 1991; 1993; 1995; 1997; 1999; 2001; 2003; 2005; 2007; 2009; 2011; 2013; 2015; 2017; 2019; 2021; 2025

Cycling competitions were staged at the Summer Universiades in 1983 and 2011 as an optional sport. In 1983, road cycling and track cycling events were competed. Mountain biking and BMX cycling disciplines were introduced in 2011.

== Competitions ==
Games	Year	Host city	Host country	Road cycling	Track cycling	Mountain bike	BMX
XII	1983	Edmonton	Canada	Road race (M & W); Team time trial (M); Time trial (W)	Sprint (M & W); Individual pursuit (M & W); Points race (M & W); Time trial (M & W)	Not included	Not included
XXVI	2011	Shenzhen	China	Road race (M & W); Team time trial (M & W)	Sprint (M & W); Individual pursuit (M & W); Points race (M & W); Keirin (M); 500 m time trial (W)	Cross-country (M & W)	Race (M & W)

== Medal table ==
Rank	Nation	Gold	Silver	Bronze	Total
1	Soviet Union (URS)	10	6	5	21
2	Russia (RUS)	7	7	2	16
3	China (CHN)	3	0	2	5
4	Lithuania (LTU)	3	0	1	4
5	France (FRA)	1	3	4	8
6	Switzerland (SUI)	1	3	1	5
7	South Korea (KOR)	1	2	4	7
8	Ukraine (UKR)	1	2	1	4
9	Italy (ITA)	1	1	1	3
10	Germany (GER)	0	1	1	2
11	Estonia (EST)	0	1	0	1
11	Netherlands (NED)	0	1	0	1
11	Romania (ROM)	0	1	0	1
14	Japan (JPN)	0	0	2	2
15	Belgium (BEL)	0	0	1	1
15	Canada (CAN)	0	0	1	1
15	Cuba (CUB)	0	0	1	1
15	Czech Republic (CZE)	0	0	1	1
Totals (18 entries)		28	28	28	84

== See also ==
- World University Cycling Championship
