= Cycling at the 2011 Summer Universiade – Women's road race =

The women's road race was one of the cycling events at the 2011 Summer Universiade in Shenzhen, China. It took place on 13 August 2011, featuring 37 women from 11 countries and was held over 122 km distance.

== Results ==
Rank	Rider	Nationality	Time
1st	Gu Sun-Geun	South Korea	3:31.42
2nd	Son Hee-Jung	South Korea	"
3rd	Anne Arnouts	Belgium	"
4th	Romy Kasper	Germany	"
5th	Yu Seonha	South Korea	"
6th	Aleksandra Sošenko	Lithuania	"
7th	Aizhan Zhaparova	Russia	"
8th	An-Li Pretorius	South Africa	"
9th	Minami Uwano	Japan	"
10th	Doris Schweizer	Switzerland	"
11th	Vaida Pikauskaitė	Lithuania	"
12th	Elena Bocharnikova	Russia	"
13th	Yuko Myochin	Japan	"
14th	Kathrin Hammes	Germany	"
15th	Lina Kristin Schink	Germany	"
16th	Tseng Hsiaochia	Chinese Taipei	"
17th	Anna Zavershinskayo	Russia	"
18th	Eglė Zablockytė	Lithuania	3:31.59
19th	Kristina Chernysheva	Russia	"
20th	Jana Schemmer	Germany	3:32.24
21st	Sakura Tsukagoshi	Japan	3:34.47
22nd	Tserenlkham Solongo	Mongolia	3:37.09
23rd	Kimberley Yap	Malaysia	3:37.20
24th	Galina Chernyshova	Russia	3:39.08
25th	Yoshiko Kondo	Japan	3:40.57
	Mai Tanaka	Japan	OTL
	Lee Aejung	South Korea	DNF
	Batbaatar Orkhontuya	Mongolia	DNF
	Leandri du Toit	South Africa	DNF
	Lee Yuhsuan	Chinese Taipei	DNF
	Huang Tingying	Chinese Taipei	DNF
	Vilija Sereikaitė	Lithuania	DNS
	Aušrinė Trebaitė	Lithuania	DNS
