= Swimming at the 2011 Summer Universiade =

Swimming at the XXVI Summer Universiade
- Venues: Universiade Center Aquatic Center; Seven Star Bay
- Dates: 13 August 2011 – 19 August 2011

Swimming at the 2011 Summer Universiade was contested from August 13 to August 19 in Shenzhen, China. The competition featured 40 long course (50m) pool events and 2 open water events, held at the Universiade Center Aquatic Center and the Seven Star Bay, respectively. This edition marked the first time an open water event was held at an Universiade.

== Participating nations ==
Countries with swimmers at the 2011 World University Games included:

- Angola
- Australia (24)
- Austria
- Belarus
- Belgium (5)
- Brazil
- Bulgaria
- Canada (44)
- China
- Chinese Taipei
- Comoros
- Czech Republic
- Estonia
- France (14)
- Germany
- Great Britain
- Guatemala
- Hong Kong
- Hungary
- India
- Indonesia
- Ireland (8)
- Israel
- Italy (32)
- Japan (33)
- Kenya
- South Korea
- Kyrgyzstan
- Lebanon
- Lithuania
- Macau
- Macedonia
- Malaysia
- Mongolia
- Morocco
- Netherlands Antilles
- New Zealand (22)
- Niger
- Northern Mariana Islands
- Norway
- Oman
- Pakistan
- Palestine
- Peru
- Philippines
- Poland
- Portugal
- Romania
- Russia
- Saudi Arabia
- Senegal
- Singapore
- Slovakia
- Slovenia
- South Africa
- Spain (6)
- Sri Lanka
- Sweden
- Switzerland (12)
- Syria
- Tanzania
- Uganda
- Ukraine
- United Arab Emirates
- United States (50)
- Uruguay

== Event schedule ==
=== Open water ===
Saturday, August 13, 2011: Men's 10 km marathon (8:00 a.m.), women's 10 km marathon (8:15 a.m.)

=== Pool ===
Date	Sunday August 14	Monday August 15	Tuesday August 16
Events	50m butterfly (w); 200m butterfly (m); 200m breaststroke (m); 800m freestyle (w); 200m backstroke (m); 4 × 100 m Freestyle Relay (w)	50m butterfly (m); 400m freestyle (w); 800m freestyle (m); 100m backstroke (m); 200m Individual Medley (w); 100m freestyle (w); 4 × 100 m Freestyle Relay (m)	50m backstroke (m); 400m Individual Medley (w); 100m freestyle (m); 100m breaststroke (m); 200m breaststroke (w); 200m freestyle (w); 4 × 200 m Freestyle Relay (m)
Date	Wednesday August 17	Thursday August 18	Friday August 19
Events	50m breaststroke (w); 100m butterfly (w); 100m butterfly (m); 400m freestyle (m); 100m backstroke (w); 200m Individual Medley (m); 4 × 200 m Freestyle Relay (w)	400m Individual Medley (m); 1500m freestyle (w); 50m backstroke (w); 50m breaststroke (m); 200m butterfly (w); 200m freestyle (m); 4 × 100 m Medley Relay (w)	50m freestyle (w); 50m freestyle (m); 200m backstroke (w); 1500m freestyle (m); 100m breaststroke (w); 4 × 100 m Medley Relay (m)

m= men's event, w= women's event
Preliminaries begin daily at 9:00 a.m., finals at 7:00 p.m. All events are preliminary/final, expect the 800 m and 1500 m freestyle events, which are timed final events (all swim only once, fastest heat swims with finals).

== Medal summary ==
=== Medal table ===
Rank	Nation	Gold	Silver	Bronze	Total
1	United States (USA)	12	11	4	27
2	Japan (JPN)	6	7	13	26
3	China (CHN)	6	0	3	9
4	New Zealand (NZL)	5	3	4	12
5	Italy (ITA)	4	2	4	10
6	Hungary (HUN)	3	0	0	3
7	Australia (AUS)	2	1	5	8
8	Lithuania (LTU)	2	0	0	2
9	Spain (ESP)	1	3	2	6
10	Belarus (BLR)	1	1	1	3
11	Great Britain (GBR)	1	0	0	1
12	Canada (CAN)	0	3	0	3
13	Brazil (BRA)	0	2	1	3
13	Ukraine (UKR)	0	2	1	3
15	Russia (RUS)	0	1	2	3
16	France (FRA)	0	1	1	2
16	South Korea (KOR)	0	1	1	2
18	Germany (GER)	0	1	0	1
18	Israel (ISR)	0	1	0	1
18	Romania (ROU)	0	1	0	1
21	Austria (AUT)	0	0	1	1
21	Poland (POL)	0	0	1	1
Totals (22 entries)		43	41	44	128

=== Men's events ===
Event	Gold		Silver		Bronze	
50 m freestyle	Lucio Spadaro; Italy	22.30	Adam Small; United States	22.31	Shinri Shioura; Japan	22.37
100 m freestyle	Jimmy Feigen; United States	49.26	Norbert Trandafir; Romania	49.41	Shinri Shioura; Japan	49.50
200 m freestyle	Matt McLean; United States	1:47.44	Clement Lefert; France	1:47.78	Sho Uchida; Japan	1:49.06
400 m freestyle	David McKeon; Australia	3:48.78	Michael Klueh; United States	3:48.84	Sho Uchida; Japan	3:51.93
800 m freestyle	Michael Klueh; United States	7:52.31	Rocco Potenza; Italy	7:53.45	Yohsuke Miyamoto; Japan	7:56.29
1500 m freestyle	Rocco Potenza; Italy	15:00.57	Yohsuke Miyamoto; Japan	15:04.86	Sergii Frolov; Ukraine	15:06.17
50 m backstroke	Ryosuke Irie; Japan	25.11	Guy Barnea; Israel	25.21	Sergey Makov; Russia	25.42
100 m backstroke	Gareth Kean; New Zealand	54.71	Juan Miguel Rando Galvez; Spain	54.94	Kurt Bassett; New Zealand; Sebastiano Ranfagni; Italy	55.21
200 m backstroke	Ryosuke Irie; Japan	1:56.01	Rex Tullius; United States	1:58.66	Gareth Kean; New Zealand	1:58.74
50 m breaststroke	Glenn Snyders; New Zealand	27.37 NR	João Gomes Jr. Brazil	27.60	Mattia Pesce; Italy	27.80
100 m breaststroke	Giedrius Titenis; Lithuania	1:00.39	Glenn Snyders; New Zealand	1:00.71	João Gomes Jr. Brazil	1:00.78
200 m breaststroke	Glenn Snyders; New Zealand; Giedrius Titenis; Lithuania	2:10.85 NR	Not awarded		Kazuki Otsuda; Japan	2:10.96
50 m butterfly	Tim Phillips; United States	23.51	Paolo Facchinelli; Italy	23.85	Masayuki Kishida; Japan	23.93
100 m butterfly	Tim Phillips; United States	52.06	Tom Shields; United States	52.62	Paweł Korzeniowski; Poland	52.96
200 m butterfly	László Cseh; Hungary	1:55.87	Bobby Bollier; United States	1:56.06	Hidemasa Sano; Japan	1:56.81
200 m individual medley	László Cseh; Hungary	1:57.86	Yuya Horihata; Japan	1:59.74	Yuma Kosaka; Japan	1:59.81
400 m individual medley	László Cseh; Hungary	4:12.67	Yuya Horihata; Japan	4:13.66	William Harris; United States	4:15.40
4 × 100 m freestyle relay	United States; Jimmy Feigen (49.27); Tim Phillips (48.96); Kohlton Norys (48.73); Bobby Savulich (48.88)	3:15.84	Brazil; Marcos Macedo (50.02); Marcelo Chierighini (48.86); Henrique Martins (50.34); Nicolas Oliveira (48.08)	3:17.30	France; Clément Lefert (49.56); Guillaume Strohmeyer (50.14); Joris Hustache (49.48); Lorys Bourelly (49.60)	3:18.78
4 × 200 m freestyle relay	United States; Michael Klueh (1:48.79); Dax Hill (1:48.89); Matt Bartlett (1:48.62); Matt McLean (1:47.24)	7:13.54	Japan; Sho Sotodate (1:49.14); Yuya Horihata (1:48.08); Yuma Kosaka (1:49.30); Sho Uchida (1:48.14)	7:14.66	Australia; David McKeon (1:48.92); Mitchell Dixon (1:49.58); Kristopher Taylor (1:49.76); Nic Ffrost (1:49.32)	7:17.58
4 × 100 m medley relay	Japan; Ryosuke Irie (53.56); Ryo Tateishi (1:00.04); Masayuki Kishida (52.46); Shinri Shioura (48.96)	3:35.02	United States; Rex Tullius (55.15); George Klein (1:01.17); Tim Phillips (52.55); Jimmy Feigen (49.05)	3:37.92	New Zealand; Gareth Kean (54.24); Glenn Snyders (59.63); Kurt Bassett (54.60); Matthew Stanley (50.28)	3:38.75
4 × 100 m medley relay	Japan; Ryosuke Irie (53.56); Ryo Tateishi (1:00.04); Masayuki Kishida (52.46); Shinri Shioura (48.96)	3:35.02	United States; Rex Tullius (55.15); George Klein (1:01.17); Tim Phillips (52.55); Jimmy Feigen (49.05)	3:37.92	Italy; Sebastiano Ranfagni (55.17); Mattia Pesce (1:01.16); Paolo Facchinelli (53.27); Luca Leonardi (49.15)	3:38.75
10 km marathon	Simone Ruffini; Italy	1:58:00.74	Kirill Abrosimov; Russia	2:00:03.35	Yasunari Hirai; Japan	2:00:05.54

=== Women's events ===
Event	Gold		Silver		Bronze	
50 m freestyle	Aleksandra Gerasimenya; Belarus	24.66	Darya Stepanyuk; Ukraine	25.12	Cate Campbell; Australia	25.17
100 m freestyle	Tang Yi; China	54.24 GR	Darya Stepanyuk; Ukraine	55.32	Megan Romano; United States	55.38
200 m freestyle	Melania Costa Schmid; Spain	1:57.98	Lauren Boyle; New Zealand	1:59.19	Karlee Bispo; United States	1:59.31
400 m freestyle	Lauren Boyle; New Zealand	4:07.78	Melania Costa Schmid; Spain	4:07.97	Stephanie Peacock; United States	4:10.25
800 m freestyle	Lauren Boyle; New Zealand	8:26.30 NR	Haley Anderson; United States	8:27.11	Melania Costa Schmid; Spain	8:33.66
1500 m freestyle	Haley Anderson; United States	16:21.72	Melania Costa Schmid; Spain	16:21.79	Lauren Boyle; New Zealand	16:26.37
50 m backstroke	Jenny Connolly; United States	27.92 GR	Aleksandra Gerasimenya; Belarus	27.93	Grace Loh; Australia	28.37
100 m backstroke	Shiho Sakai; Japan	1:00.28	Jenny Connolly; United States	1:00.50	Aleksandra Gerasimenya; Belarus	1:00.91
200 m backstroke	Shiho Sakai; Japan	2:09.75	Hilary Caldwell; Canada	2:11.12	Duane da Rocha; Spain	2:11.24
50 m breaststroke	Annie Chandler; United States	31.13	Tera van Beilen; Canada	31.45	Valentina Artemyeva; Russia	31.74
100 m breaststroke	Sun Ye; China	1:07.53	Tera van Beilen; Canada	1:08.24	Satomi Suzuki; Japan	1:08.45
200 m breaststroke	Sun Ye; China	2:24.63	Andrea Kropp; United States	2:26.18	Satomi Suzuki; Japan	2:26.67
50 m butterfly	Lu Ying; China	25.98	Marieke Guehrer; Australia	26.24	Alice Mills; Australia	26.53
100 m butterfly	Lu Ying; China	57.86 GR	Tomoyo Fukuda; Japan	59.08	Alice Mills; Australia	59.11
200 m butterfly	Jessica Dickons; Great Britain	2:08.91	Natsumi Hoshi; Japan	2:08.94	Choi Hye-Ra; South Korea	2:09.35
200 m individual medley	Izumi Kato; Japan	2:13.52	Choi Hye-Ra; South Korea	2:14.17	Liu Jing; China	2:14.3
400 m individual medley	Maya Dirado; United States	4:40.79	Miho Takahashi; Japan	4:42.28	Jördis Steinegger; Austria	4:43.30
4 × 100 m freestyle relay	Australia; Cate Campbell (55.26); Alice Mills (55.35); Jessica Morrison (55.82); Marieke Guehrer (53.60)	3:40.03 GR	United States; Kate Dwelley (55.22); Felicia Lee (55.22); Shannon Vreeland (55.46); Megan Romano (54.13)	3:40.19	China; Zhu Qianwei (55.31); Lu Ying (55.94); Liu Jing (55.67); Tang Yi (53.37)	3:40.29
4 × 200 m freestyle relay	United States; Karlee Bispo (2:00.19); Chelsea Nauta (1:58.66); Kate Dwelley (1:58.76); Megan Romano (1:57.41)	7:55.02 GR	New Zealand; Natasha Hind (2:00.57); Melissa Ingram (2:00.56); Amaka Gessler (1:59.87); Lauren Boyle (1:58.60)	7:59.60	China; Tang Yi (1:58.17); Zhu Qianwei (1:57.88); Liu Jing (2:00.88); Lu Ying (2:02.69)	7:59.62
4 × 100 m medley relay	China; Gao Chang (1:01.59); Sun Ye (1:06.81); Lu Ying (57.52); Tang Yi (53.23)	3:59.15 GR	United States; Jenny Connolly (1:00.21 GR); Annie Chandler (1:07.40); Lyndsay DePaul (58.84); Megan Romano (53.70)	4:00.15	Japan; Shiho Sakai (1:00.41); Satomi Suzuki (1:07.38); Tomoyo Fukuda (58.92); Yayoi Matsumoto (54.27)	4:00.98
10 km marathon	Rachele Bruni; Italy	2:06:49.31	Nadine Reichert; Germany	2:07:29.21	Alice Franco; Italy	2:08:42.77
