= All-time FISU World University Games medal table =

FISU World University Games
- Status: active
- Genre: sporting event
- Frequency: usually biennial
- Location: various
- Inaugurated: 1959 (summer); 1960 (winter)
- Organiser: FISU

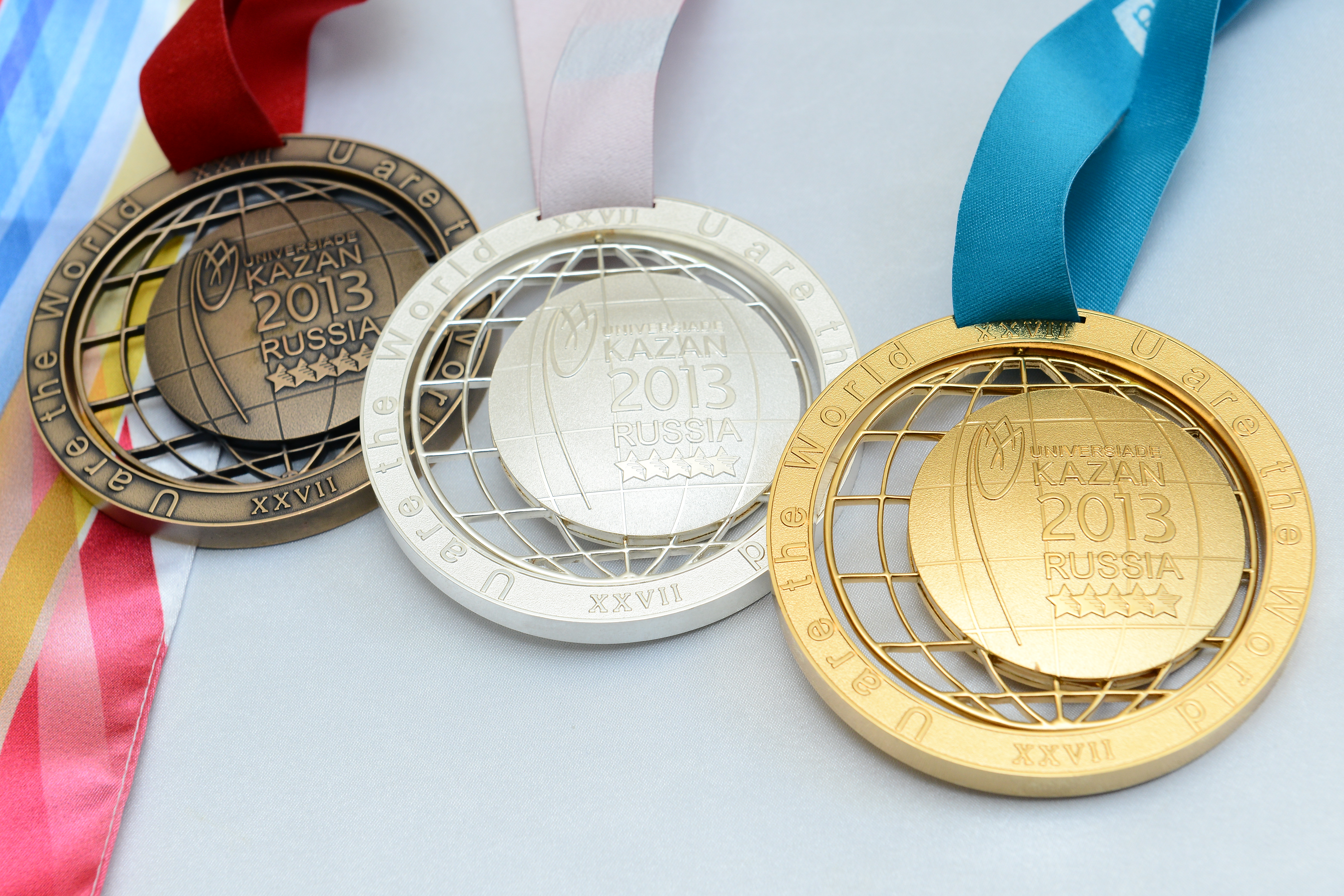
2013 Summer Universiade Medals

An all-time FISU World University Games medal table from 1959 Summer Universiade to 2025 Summer World University Games and 1960 Winter Universiade to 2025 Winter World University Games, is tabulated below. The table is the consequence of the sum of the medal tables of the various editions of the Summer and the Winter FISU World University Games (previously called Universiade). The results code are attributed to the IOC country code. NUSF stands for National University Sports Federation.

The outcomes of doping cases have resulted in changes to this medal table.

== Summer World University Games ==
As of 2025 Summer World University Games.

Rank	Nation	Gold	Silver	Bronze	Total
1	China	586	386	324	1,296
2	United States	534	467	437	1,438
3	Russia	433	362	421	1,216
4	Japan	412	390	504	1,306
5	Soviet Union*	409	335	250	994
6	South Korea	281	228	286	795
7	Italy	224	236	301	761
8	Ukraine	186	191	184	561
9	Romania	149	132	150	431
10	Hungary	121	116	129	366
11	Poland	119	143	162	424
12	France	106	151	217	474
13	Chinese Taipei	100	129	146	375
14	Germany	74	99	146	319
15	Great Britain	73	114	124	311
16	Cuba	71	63	69	203
17	Australia	62	55	84	201
18	West Germany*	56	80	100	236
19	Canada	52	102	137	291
20	Turkey	50	57	70	177
21	Belarus	46	57	70	173
22	Bulgaria	42	42	49	133
23	Brazil	41	55	116	212
24	South Africa	41	47	45	133
25	Iran	41	38	54	133
26	North Korea	41	31	41	113
27	Thailand	33	36	65	134
28	Czech Republic	33	33	68	134
29	Netherlands	32	47	55	134
30	Lithuania	32	16	26	74
31	Mexico	30	56	62	148
32	Yugoslavia*	26	32	30	88
33	East Germany*	26	25	27	78
34	Kazakhstan	24	49	70	143
35	Spain	23	42	65	130
36	Czechoslovakia*	19	29	24	72
37	Portugal	18	19	15	52
38	India	18	15	23	56
39	Finland	17	16	22	55
40	Switzerland	16	23	34	73
41	Azerbaijan	15	16	22	53
42	Jamaica	14	15	13	42
43	Austria	14	13	27	54
44	Uzbekistan	13	24	31	68
45	Belgium	12	17	28	57
46	Serbia	12	14	22	48
47	Nigeria	12	11	10	33
48	Slovakia	11	19	27	57
49	Mongolia	10	18	33	61
50	New Zealand	10	14	13	37
51	Hong Kong	10	3	19	32
52	Armenia	8	10	21	39
53	Kenya	8	10	11	29
54	Ireland	8	9	9	26
55	Morocco	8	8	8	24
56	Individual Neutral Athletes	8	8	5	21
57	Sweden	8	6	13	27
58	Estonia	7	8	11	26
59	Indonesia	7	6	14	27
60	Latvia	7	6	7	20
61	Moldova	7	5	19	31
62	Slovenia	6	7	9	22
63	Uganda	6	5	3	14
64	Dominican Republic	6	2	0	8
65	Croatia	4	9	16	29
66	Israel	4	7	6	17
67	Kyrgyzstan	4	2	12	18
68	Greece	3	8	13	24
69	Algeria	3	8	11	22
70	Georgia	3	6	14	23
71	Cyprus	3	5	11	19
72	Norway	3	4	7	14
73	Serbia and Montenegro*	3	4	4	11
74	Macau	3	3	3	9
75	Turkmenistan	2	3	11	16
76	Philippines	2	3	1	6
77	Ivory Coast	2	2	4	8
78	Luxembourg	2	1	1	4
79	Ghana	2	0	1	3
80	Malaysia	1	8	20	29
81	Egypt	1	6	8	15
82	Senegal	1	5	3	9
83	Colombia	1	3	8	12
84	Vietnam	1	2	11	14
85	Denmark	1	2	4	7
86	Botswana	1	1	2	4
87	Barbados	1	1	0	2
87	Virgin Islands	1	1	0	2
89	Bermuda	1	0	1	2
90	Honduras	1	0	0	1
90	Montenegro	1	0	0	1
90	Saint Vincent and the Grenadines	1	0	0	1
93	Argentina	0	4	3	7
94	Burkina Faso	0	3	0	3
94	Uruguay	0	3	0	3
96	Tunisia	0	2	4	6
97	Tajikistan	0	2	3	5
98	Singapore	0	2	1	3
99	Independent Participants	0	2	0	2
99	Ecuador	0	2	0	2
101	Bahamas	0	1	3	4
102	Chile	0	1	2	3
102	Madagascar	0	1	2	3
102	Peru	0	1	2	3
105	Mozambique	0	1	1	2
105	Qatar	0	1	1	2
107	Albania	0	1	0	1
107	Brunei	0	1	0	1
107	Cameroon	0	1	0	1
107	Kosovo	0	1	0	1
107	Namibia	0	1	0	1
107	Sierra Leone	0	1	0	1
107	Tanzania	0	1	0	1
107	Trinidad and Tobago	0	1	0	1
115	Puerto Rico	0	0	3	3
116	Bosnia and Herzegovina	0	0	1	1
116	Ethiopia	0	0	1	1
116	Jordan	0	0	1	1
116	North Macedonia	0	0	1	1
116	Panama	0	0	1	1
116	Venezuela	0	0	1	1
Totals (121 entries)		4,980	4,926	5,780	15,686

== Winter University Games ==
After the 2025 Winter World University Games.

Rank	NUSF	Gold	Silver	Bronze	Total
1	Russia (RUS)	208	192	178	578
2	South Korea (KOR)	127	94	84	305
3	Japan (JPN)	119	125	110	354
4	Soviet Union (URS)*	113	98	70	281
5	China (CHN)	77	69	78	224
6	France (FRA)	76	65	78	219
7	Poland (POL)	61	69	66	196
8	Italy (ITA)	60	68	75	203
9	Austria (AUT)	55	59	58	172
10	Czechoslovakia (TCH)*	52	48	24	124
11	Switzerland (SUI)	47	43	46	136
12	United States (USA)	39	58	65	162
13	Ukraine (UKR)	37	45	46	128
14	Kazakhstan (KAZ)	35	33	45	113
15	Czech Republic (CZE)	31	29	49	109
16	Slovenia (SLO)	27	30	31	88
17	Canada (CAN)	25	33	42	100
18	Germany (GER)	24	32	31	87
19	Finland (FIN)	22	27	40	89
20	Belarus (BLR)	21	25	19	65
21	Slovakia (SVK)	20	22	27	69
22	Netherlands (NED)	19	17	14	50
23	Sweden (SWE)	16	19	21	56
24	Bulgaria (BUL)	15	16	12	43
25	Norway (NOR)	15	14	11	40
26	West Germany (FRG)*	15	5	9	29
27	Spain (ESP)	11	13	7	31
28	Great Britain (GBR)	6	9	6	21
29	Yugoslavia (YUG)*	4	8	12	24
30	North Korea (PRK)	4	7	9	20
31	East Germany (GDR)*	4	4	6	14
32	Hungary (HUN)	4	4	3	11
33	Estonia (EST)	3	5	1	9
34	Serbia (SRB)	3	0	1	4
35	Australia (AUS)	1	3	1	5
36	Serbia and Montenegro (SCG)*	1	2	0	3
37	Chile (CHI)	1	1	0	2
38	Israel (ISR)	1	0	0	1
38	Latvia (LAT)	1	0	0	1
38	Monaco (MON)	1	0	0	1
38	New Zealand (NZL)	1	0	0	1
42	Romania (ROU)	0	3	2	5
43	Lithuania (LTU)	0	2	2	4
44	Andorra (AND)	0	2	1	3
45	Thailand (THA)	0	1	1	2
46	Azerbaijan (AZE)	0	1	0	1
46	Belgium (BEL)	0	1	0	1
46	Turkey (TUR)	0	1	0	1
49	Armenia (ARM)	0	0	2	2
49	Liechtenstein (LIE)	0	0	2	2
51	Argentina (ARG)	0	0	1	1
51	Chinese Taipei (TPE)	0	0	1	1
51	Croatia (CRO)	0	0	1	1
51	Georgia (GEO)	0	0	1	1
Totals (54 entries)		1,402	1,402	1,389	4,193

== Combined Total ==
Last updated after the 2025 Summer World University Games

Rank	NUSF	Gold	Silver	Bronze	Total
1	China (CHN)	663	455	402	1,520
2	Russia (RUS)	641	554	599	1,794
3	United States (USA)	574	525	502	1,601
4	Japan (JPN)	531	515	614	1,660
5	Soviet Union (URS)*	522	433	320	1,275
6	South Korea (KOR)	408	322	370	1,100
7	Italy (ITA)	274	304	374	952
8	Ukraine (UKR)	224	236	230	690
9	France (FRA)	182	216	295	693
10	Poland (POL)	180	212	228	620
11	Romania (ROU)	149	135	152	436
12	Hungary (HUN)	125	120	132	377
13	Chinese Taipei (TPE)	100	129	147	376
14	Germany (GER)	98	132	177	407
15	Great Britain (GBR)	79	123	127	329
16	Canada (CAN)	78	135	179	392
17	Cuba (CUB)	73	71	72	216
18	Czechoslovakia (TCH)*	71	77	48	196
19	West Germany (FRG)*	70	85	110	265
20	Austria (AUT)	70	70	85	225
21	Belarus (BLR)	65	84	88	237
22	Czech Republic (CZE)	64	62	117	243
23	Switzerland (SUI)	63	67	80	210
24	Australia (AUS)	63	58	85	206
25	Kazakhstan (KAZ)	59	82	115	256
26	Bulgaria (BUL)	57	58	62	177
27	Netherlands (NED)	51	64	69	184
28	Turkey (TUR)	50	58	70	178
29	North Korea (PRK)	45	38	50	133
30	Brazil (BRA)	41	55	116	212
31	South Africa (RSA)	41	47	45	133
32	Iran (IRI)	41	38	54	133
33	Finland (FIN)	39	43	62	144
34	Spain (ESP)	34	55	72	161
35	Thailand (THA)	33	37	66	136
36	Slovenia (SLO)	33	37	40	110
37	Lithuania (LTU)	32	18	28	78
38	Slovakia (SVK)	31	41	53	125
39	Mexico (MEX)	30	56	62	148
40	Yugoslavia (YUG)*	30	40	42	112
41	East Germany (GDR)*	30	29	33	92
42	Sweden (SWE)	24	25	35	84
43	Portugal (POR)	18	19	15	52
44	Norway (NOR)	18	18	18	54
45	India (IND)	18	15	23	56
46	Serbia (SRB)	15	14	23	52
47	Jamaica (JAM)	14	15	13	42
48	Uzbekistan (UZB)	13	24	31	68
49	Azerbaijan (AZE)	13	15	22	50
50	Belgium (BEL)	12	18	28	58
51	Nigeria (NGR)	12	11	11	34
52	New Zealand (NZL)	11	14	13	38
53	Mongolia (MGL)	10	18	33	61
54	Estonia (EST)	10	13	12	35
55	Hong Kong (HKG)	10	3	19	32
56	Armenia (ARM)	8	10	23	41
57	Kenya (KEN)	8	10	11	29
58	Ireland (IRL)	8	9	9	26
59	Morocco (MAR)	8	8	8	24
60	Individual Neutral Athletes (AIN)	8	8	5	21
61	Indonesia (INA)	7	6	14	27
62	Latvia (LAT)	7	6	7	20
63	Moldova (MDA)	7	5	19	31
64	Uganda (UGA)	6	5	3	14
65	Dominican Republic (DOM)	6	2	0	8
66	Israel (ISR)	5	7	6	18
67	Croatia (CRO)	4	9	17	30
68	Kyrgyzstan (KGZ)	4	2	12	18
69	Greece (GRE)	3	8	13	24
70	Algeria (ALG)	3	8	11	22
71	Georgia (GEO)	3	6	16	25
72	Cyprus (CYP)	3	5	11	19
73	Serbia and Montenegro (SCG)*	3	5	3	11
74	Macau (MAC)	3	3	3	9
75	Turkmenistan (TKM)	2	3	11	16
76	Philippines (PHI)	2	3	1	6
77	Ivory Coast (CIV)	2	2	4	8
78	Luxembourg (LUX)	2	1	1	4
79	Ghana (GHA)	2	0	1	3
80	Malaysia (MAS)	1	8	20	29
81	Egypt (EGY)	1	6	8	15
82	Senegal (SEN)	1	5	3	9
83	Vietnam (VIE)	1	3	15	19
84	Colombia (COL)	1	3	8	12
85	Denmark (DEN)	1	2	4	7
86	Chile (CHI)	1	2	2	5
87	Botswana (BOT)	1	1	2	4
88	Barbados (BAR)	1	1	0	2
88	Virgin Islands (ISV)	1	1	0	2
90	Bermuda (BER)	1	0	1	2
91	Honduras (HON)	1	0	0	1
91	Monaco (MON)	1	0	0	1
91	Montenegro (MNE)	1	0	0	1
91	Saint Vincent and the Grenadines (VIN)	1	0	0	1
95	Argentina (ARG)	0	4	4	8
96	Burkina Faso (BUR)	0	3	0	3
96	Uruguay (URU)	0	3	0	3
98	Tunisia (TUN)	0	2	4	6
99	Tajikistan (TJK)	0	2	3	5
100	Andorra (AND)	0	2	1	3
100	Singapore (SGP)	0	2	1	3
102	Ecuador (ECU)	0	2	0	2
102	Independent Participants*	0	2	0	2
104	Bahamas (BAH)	0	1	3	4
105	Madagascar (MAD)	0	1	2	3
105	Peru (PER)	0	1	2	3
107	Mozambique (MOZ)	0	1	1	2
107	Qatar (QAT)	0	1	1	2
109	Albania (ALB)	0	1	0	1
109	Brunei (BRU)	0	1	0	1
109	Cameroon (CMR)	0	1	0	1
109	Kosovo (KOS)	0	1	0	1
109	Namibia (NAM)	0	1	0	1
109	Tanzania (TAN)	0	1	0	1
109	Trinidad and Tobago (TTO)	0	1	0	1
116	Puerto Rico (PUR)	0	0	3	3
117	Liechtenstein (LIE)	0	0	2	2
118	Bosnia and Herzegovina (BIH)	0	0	1	1
118	Ethiopia (ETH)	0	0	1	1
118	Jordan (JOR)	0	0	1	1
118	North Macedonia (MKD)	0	0	1	1
118	Panama (PAN)	0	0	1	1
118	Venezuela (VEN)	0	0	1	1
Totals (123 entries)		6,371	6,335	7,173	19,879

== See also ==
- List of FISU World University Games medals by host nation
- All-time Olympic Games medal table
- All-time Paralympic Games medal table
- All-time Youth Olympic Games medal table
