= Argentina at the FISU World University Games =

Argentina at the Universiade
- IOC code: ARG

Summer appearances
- 1959−1983; 1985; 1987; 1989; 1991; 1993; 1995; 1997; 1999; 2001; 2003; 2005; 2007; 2009; 2011; 2013; 2015; 2017; 2019; 2021

Winter appearances
- 1960−2005; 2007; 2009; 2011; 2013; 2015; 2017; 2019

The flag of the International University Sports Federation.

Argentina has participated in multiple editions of the FISU World University Games, also known as the Universiade, an international multi-sport event organized for university athletes by the International University Sports Federation (FISU). Argentina has primarily competed in the Summer Universiade, sending student-athletes to represent the country in a variety of disciplines.

== Medal count ==
=== Summer Universiade ===
Argentina has won 7 medals in appearances at the Summer Universiade

Edition				
(Italy) Turin 1959	0	0	0	0
(Bulgaria) Sofia 1961	0	0	0	0
(Brazil) Porto Alegre 1963	0	0	0	0
(Hungary) Budapest 1965	0	0	0	0
(Japan) Tokyo 1967	0	0	0	0
(Italy) Turin 1970	0	0	0	0
(Soviet Union) Moscow 1973	0	0	0	0
(Italy) Rome 1975	0	0	0	0
(Bulgaria) Sofia 1977	0	0	0	0
Mexico City 1979	0	0	0	0
(Romania) Bucarest 1981	0	0	0	0
(Canada) Edmonton 1983	0	0	0	0
(Japan) Kobe 1985	0	0	0	0
(Socialist Federal Republic of Yugoslavia) Zagreb 1987	0	0	0	0
(West Germany) Duisburg 1989	0	0	0	0
(United Kingdom) Sheffield 1991	0	0	0	0
(United States) Buffalo 1993	0	0	0	0
(Japan) Fukuoka 1995	0	0	0	0
(Italy) Sicily 1997	0	0	0	0
(Spain) Palma de Mallorca 1999	0	1	1	2
(China) Beijing 2001	0	0	0	0
(South Korea) Daegu 2003	0	0	0	0
(Turkey) Ízmir 2005	0	0	0	0
(Thailand) Bangkok 2007	0	0	0	0
(Serbia) Belgrade 2009	0	0	0	0
(China) Shenzhen 2011	0	0	0	0
(Russia) Kazan 2013	0	1	1	2
(South Korea) Gwangju 2015	0	0	1	1
Taipei 2017	0	1	0	1
(Italy) Naples 2019	0	1	0	1
(China) Chengdu 2021	0	0	0	0
(Germany) Rhine-Rühr 2025	0	0	0	0
Total	0	4	3	7

== Medalists ==
Medal	Name	Universiade	Sport	Event
Silver	Carolina Mariani	1999 Palma de Mallorca	Judo	Women's half-lightweight
Bronze	Solange Witteveen	1999 Palma de Mallorca	Athletics	Women's high jump
Silver	Samantha Dacunha Kessler	2013 Kazan	Sambo	Women's +80 kg
Bronze	Alejandro Clara	2013 Kazan	Sambo	Men's 74 kg
Bronze	Fernando Arpajou; Ramiro Benitez; Ignacio Fernandez; Facundo Imhoff; Manuel Leskiw; Ivan Postemsky; Juan Riganti; Alejandro Toro; Patricio Vera; Mariano Vildosola; Juan Villarruel; Bruno Vinti	2015 Gwangju	Volleyball	Men's team
Silver	Lucas Lautaro Guzman	2017 Taipei	Taekwondo	Men's -62 kg
Silver	Belén Casetta	2019 Naples	Athletics	Women's 3000m steeplechase
