= Athletics at the 2011 Summer Universiade – Men's 100 metres =

The Men's 100 metres at the 2011 Summer Universiade took place on 16–17 August. The gold medal was won by Jacques Harvey of Jamaica in a time of 10.14 seconds and was followed home by Rytis Sakalauskas of Lithuania in silver (same time) and Su Bingtian of China in bronze

== Medalists ==
Gold	Silver	Bronze
Jacques Harvey; Jamaica	Rytis Sakalauskas; Lithuania	Su Bingtian; China

== Results ==
=== Heats ===
The first round was held on 16 August. Qualification: First 3 in each heat (Q) and the next 5 fastest (q) qualified for the quarterfinals.

Wind:
Heat 1: -0.1 m/s, Heat 2: +0.4 m/s, Heat 3: +0.5 m/s, Heat 4: -0.4 m/s, Heat 5: -0.4 m/s, Heat 6: -0.4 m/s, Heat 7: -0.4 m/s, Heat 8: -0.4 m/s, Heat 9: -0.4 m/s

Rank	Heat	Name	Nationality	Reaction	Result	Notes	Qual.
1	3	Simon Magakwe	South Africa	0.176	10.30		Q
2	3	Dontae Richards-Kwok	Canada	0.157	10.32	PB	Q
3	2	Ronalds Arājs	Latvia	0.159	10.35		Q
4	1	Rytis Sakalauskas	Lithuania	0.169	10.38		Q
5	4	Ogho-Oghene Egwero	Nigeria	0.163	10.39		Q
6	3	Rion Pierre	Great Britain	0.146	10.41		Q
7	9	Wilfried Koffi Hua	Ivory Coast	0.225	10.42	PB	Q
8	5	Yusuke Kotani	Japan	0.152	10.43		Q
8	6	Justin Murdock	United States	0.218	10.43		Q
8	6	Diego Cavalvanti	Brazil	0.204	10.43		Q
11	7	Reza Ghasemi	Iran	0.185	10.44		Q
12	1	Sota Kawatsura	Japan	0.176	10.46		Q
13	8	Obinna Metu	Nigeria	0.139	10.48		Q
14	8	James Alaka	Great Britain	0.152	10.48		Q
15	6	Lai Chuno	Hong Kong	0.177	10.53		Q
16	7	Konstantin Petriashov	Russia	0.143	10.53		Q
17	8	Rosario La Mastra	Italy	0.141	10.54		Q
18	5	Su Bingtian	China	0.210	10.55		Q
19	7	Hannes Dreyer	South Africa	0.166	10.57		Q
20	4	Gérard Kobéané	Burkina Faso	0.158	10.58		Q
21	2	Martynas Jurgilas	Lithuania	0.164	10.59		Q
22	1	Patrick Fakiye	Australia	0.187	10.61		Q
23	2	Aleksandr Brednev	Russia	0.184	10.61		Q
24	6	Ratu Banuve Tabakaucoro	Fiji	0.115	10.63	PB	q
24	8	Jesse Uri Khob	Namibia	0.190	10.63	PB	q
26	2	Reda Megdoud	Algeria	0.180	10.64	PB	q
26	4	Hannu Hamalainen	Finland	0.158	10.64		Q
26	5	Mohammad Noor Imran A Hadi	Malaysia	0.171	10.64		Q
26	8	Petar Kremenski	Bulgaria	0.190	10.64		q
30	7	Huang Minhua	China	0.156	10.65		q
31	9	Gregor Kokalovič	Slovenia	0.152	10.67		Q
31	9	Jacques Harvey	Jamaica	0.181	10.67		Q
33	4	Kael Becerra	Chile	0.153	10.68		
34	3	Yip Siukeung	Hong Kong	0.168	10.72		
35	6	Muhannad Amirudin Jamal	Singapore	0.179	10.73		
36	2	Kelvin Basoah Asare	Ghana	0.190	10.78		
37	2	Kim Minkyun	South Korea	0.145	10.78		
38	3	Agampodi de Silva	Sri Lanka	0.189	10.79		
39	1	Enoch Sekum	Ghana	0.223	10.82	PB	
40	4	Jurgen Themen	Suriname	0.187	10.87	SB	
41	9	Mike Kalisz	Denmark	0.176	10.87		
42	1	Bilal Alsalfa	United Arab Emirates	0.199	10.89		
43	9	Carlos Moraes Junior	Brazil	0.248	10.90		
44	7	Mohd Zabidi Ghazali	Malaysia	0.141	10.92		
45	1	Marvin Kamuingona	Namibia	0.205	10.94		
46	7	Anthos Christofides	Cyprus	0.176	10.99		
47	6	Ernesto Stanley	Paraguay	0.151	11.00		
48	3	Ahmad Hazer	Lebanon	0.188	11.01		
49	5	Adrian Ferreira	Paraguay	0.205	11.03		
50	4	Akwasi Frimpong	Netherlands	0.173	11.04	PB	
51	9	Jorge Jímenez	Costa Rica	0.162	11.04		
52	1	Pao Hinfong	Macau	0.153	11.06	PB	
53	5	Keene Motukisi	Botswana	0.175	11.15		
54	3	Itai Vambe	Zimbabwe	0.175	11.18		
55	2	Paulus Mathijsen	Netherlands Antilles	0.153	11.21		
56	9	Goabaone Moitoi	Botswana	0.160	11.22		
57	2	Van Thanh Dang	Vietnam	0.176	11.29		
58	6	Youssouf Mounir	Chad	0.184	11.32		
59	4	Ismail Alkindi	Oman	0.182	11.38		
60	8	Ramsey Nasser	Lebanon	0.180	11.46		
61	8	Ouf Hamed Aloufi	Oman	0.168	11.56		
62	5	Kebby Malumbe	Zambia	0.165	11.65		
63	5	Wong Chongsam	Macau	0.200	11.89		
	4	Ali Aliallah Aboomarain	Saudi Arabia	0.146	DNF		
	7	Tony Nekemiah Kazimoto	Tanzania		DSQ	FS	
	1	Dmitrii Ilin	Kyrgyzstan		DNS		
	3	Ivan Wesonga	Uganda		DNS		
	7	Samuel Effah	Canada		DNS		
	8	Juslian Gega	Albania		DNS		

=== Quarterfinals ===
The second round of the 100 metre competition was also held on 16 August. Qualification: First 3 in each heat (Q) and the next 4 fastest (q) qualified for the semifinals.

Wind:
Heat 1: -0.1 m/s, Heat 2: +0.1 m/s, Heat 3: +0.5 m/s, Heat 4: +0.4 m/s

Rank	Heat	Name	Nationality	Reaction	Result	Notes	Qual.
1	4	Jacques Harvey	Jamaica	0.179	10.25		Q
2	1	Ogho-Oghene Egwero	Nigeria	0.165	10.28		Q
3	4	Ronalds Arājs	Latvia	0.159	10.29		Q
4	2	Rytis Sakalauskas	Lithuania	0.186	10.32		Q
4	3	Simon Magakwe	South Africa	0.187	10.32		Q
6	3	Reza Ghasemi	Iran	0.193	10.35		Q
6	4	Dontae Richards-Kwok	Canada	0.149	10.35		Q
8	1	James Alaka	Great Britain	0.160	10.36		Q
9	4	Su Bingtian	China	0.201	10.38		q
10	1	Wilfried Koffi Hua	Ivory Coast	0.210	10.41	PB	Q
10	2	Rion Pierre	Great Britain	0.154	10.41		Q
12	1	Sota Kawatsura	Japan	0.158	10.43		q
12	2	Yusuke Kotani	Japan	0.176	10.43		Q
12	3	Obinna Metu	Nigeria	0.140	10.43		Q
15	2	Diego Cavalvanti	Brazil	0.194	10.45		q
16	4	Justin Murdock	United States	0.240	10.46		q
17	3	Martynas Jurgilas	Lithuania	0.149	10.47		
18	1	Ratu Banuve Tabakaucoro	Fiji	0.146	10.49	PB	
18	2	Konstantin Petriashov	Russia	0.160	10.49		
20	1	Lai Chunho	Hong Kong	0.170	10.51		
20	3	Hannu Hamalainen	Finland	0.126	10.51		
22	3	Huang Minhua	China	0.147	10.56		
23	3	Aleksandr Brednev	Russia	0.165	10.56		
24	3	Gérard Kobéané	Burkina Faso	0.173	10.57		
25	1	Rosario La Mastra	Italy	0.136	10.58		
25	4	Mohammad Noor Imran A Hadi	Malaysia	0.170	10.58		
27	4	Patrick Fakiye	Australia	0.164	10.62		
28	2	Hannes Dreyer	South Africa	0.170	10.63		
29	2	Reda Megdoud	Algeria	0.183	10.65		
30	1	Jesse Uri Khob	Namibia	0.194	10.70		
31	4	Petar Kremenski	Bulgaria	0.197	10.72		
32	2	Gregor Kokalovič	Slovenia	0.148	10.73		

=== Semi-finals ===
Official Semifinals Video

Qualification: First 4 of each semifinal qualified directly (Q) for the final.

Wind:
Heat 1: 0.0 m/s, Heat 2: -0.8 m/s

Rank	Heat	Name	Nationality	Reaction Time	Result	Notes	Qual.
1	2	Ogho-Oghene Egwero	Nigeria	0.140	10.23	SB	Q
2	2	Rytis Sakalauskas	Lithuania	0.149	10.23		Q
3	1	Jacques Harvey	Jamaica	0.180	10.28		Q
4	1	Ronalds Arājs	Latvia	0.144	10.31		Q
5	1	Simon Magakwe	South Africa	0.164	10.32		Q
5	2	James Alaka	Great Britain	0.150	10.32		Q
7	2	Su Bingtian	China	0.175	10.34		Q
8	1	Dontae Richards-Kwok	Canada	0.146	10.35		Q
9	1	Rion Pierre	Great Britain	0.139	10.37		
10	1	Justin Murdock	United States		10.38		
11	2	Reza Ghasemi	Iran	0.172	10.39		
12	1	Sota Kawatsura	Japan	0.142	10.43		
13	1	Obinna Metu	Nigeria	0.145	10.45		
14	2	Diego Cavalvanti	Brazil	0.243	10.45		
15	2	Wilfried Koffi Hua	Ivory Coast	0.242	10.50		
16	2	Yusuke Kotani	Japan	0.193	10.52		

=== Final ===
Official Video

The final took place on the 17 August.

Wind: -0.2 m/s

Rank	Lane	Name	Nationality	Reaction	Result	Notes
1st place, gold medalist(s)	6	Jacques Harvey	Jamaica	0.162	10.14	
2nd place, silver medalist(s)	7	Rytis Sakalauskas	Lithuania	0.145	10.14	NR
3rd place, bronze medalist(s)	2	Su Bingtian	China	0.166	10.27	
4	4	Ronalds Arājs	Latvia	0.127	10.29	
5	8	James Alaka	Great Britain	0.158	10.29	
6	5	Ogho-Oghene Egwero	Nigeria	0.151	10.35	
7	9	Simon Magakwe	South Africa	0.245	10.49	
8	3	Dontae Richards-Kwok	Canada	0.148	10.60	
