= Estonia at the FISU World University Games =

Sporting event delegation

Estonia at the Universiade
- IOC code: EST
- National federation: Estonian Academic Sports Federation
- Website: www.easl.ee
- Medals Ranked 54th: Gold 10 Silver 13 Bronze 12 Total 35

Summer appearances
- 1993; 1995; 1997; 1999; 2001; 2003; 2005; 2007; 2009; 2011; 2013; 2015; 2017; 2019; 2021; 2025; 2027

Winter appearances
- 1993; 1995; 1997; 1999; 2001; 2003; 2005; 2007; 2009; 2011; 2013; 2015; 2017; 2019; 2023; 2025

Estonia has participated at the Universiade since 1993. Estonia made the first appearance at the Winter Universiade in 1997.

== Medal count ==
=== Medals by Summer Universiade ===
Estonia won 26 medals in appearances at the Summer Universiade and is at the 54th rank in the all-time Summer Universiade medal table.

Total	7	8	11	26

=== Medals by Winter Universiade ===
Estonia has won 5 medal in appearances at the Winter Universiade and is at the 34th rank in the all-time Winter Universiade medal table.

Total	3	5	1	9

== List of medalists ==
=== Summer Universiade ===
Medal	Name	Games	Sport	Event
Silver	Indrek Kaseorg	(United States) 1993 Buffalo	Athletics	Men's decathlon
Gold	Aleksander Tammert	(China) 2001 Beijing	Athletics	Men's discus throw
Bronze	Nikolai Novosjolov	(China) 2001 Beijing	Fencing	Men's individual épée
Bronze	Olga Aleksejeva	(China) 2001 Beijing	Fencing	Women's individual épée
Silver	Indrek Turi	(South Korea) 2003 Daegu	Athletics	Men's decathlon
Bronze	Allar Aasma, Henri Sool, Martin Vihmann, Mikk Joorits	(South Korea) 2003 Daegu	Athletics	Men's 4 × 100 metres relay
Bronze	Estonia	(South Korea) 2003 Daegu	Fencing	Women's team épée
Gold	Gerd Kanter	(Turkey) 2005 İzmir	Athletics	Men's discus throw
Gold	Mirjam Liimask	(Turkey) 2005 İzmir	Athletics	Women's 100 metres hurdles
Gold	Olga Aleksejeva	(Turkey) 2005 İzmir	Fencing	Women's individual épée
Silver	Taavi Peetre	(Turkey) 2005 İzmir	Athletics	Men's shot put
Bronze	Irina Embrich	(Turkey) 2005 İzmir	Fencing	Women's individual épée
Bronze	Heiki Nabi	(Turkey) 2005 İzmir	Wrestling	Men's Greco-Roman 96 kg
Silver	Margit Rüütel	(Thailand) 2007 Bangkok	Tennis	Women's singles
Bronze	Märt Israel	(Thailand) 2007 Bangkok	Athletics	Men's discus throw
Gold	Märt Israel	(China) 2011 Shenzhen	Athletics	Men's discus throw
Silver	Maaris Meier	(China) 2011 Shenzhen	Cycling	Women's cross-country
Bronze	Anna Iljuštšenko	(China) 2011 Shenzhen	Athletics	Women's high jump
Bronze	Anna Iljuštšenko	(Russia) 2013 Kazan	Athletics	Women's high jump
Gold	Tanel Laanmäe	(South Korea) 2015 Gwangju	Athletics	Men's javelin throw
Silver	Kaur Kivistik	(South Korea) 2015 Gwangju	Athletics	Men's 3000 metres steeplechase
Silver	Juhan Mettis	(South Korea) 2015 Gwangju	Judo	Men's open weight
Bronze	Nelli Paju	(South Korea) 2015 Gwangju	Fencing	Women's individual épée
Silver	Juhan Mettis	(Chinese Taipei) 2017 Taipei	Judo	Men's open weight
Gold	Lisell Jäätma, Robin Jäätma	(Italy) 2019 Naples	Archery	Mixed team compound
Bronze	Viktoria Bogdanova	(Italy) 2019 Naples	Gymnastics	Women's rhythmic individual ball

=== Winter Universiade ===
Medal	Name	Games	Sport	Event
Bronze	Kaili Sirge	(Italy) 2007 Turin	Cross-country skiing	Sprint freestyle
Gold	Mariel Merlii Pulles	(United States) 2023 Lake Placid	Cross-country skiing	Sprint freestyle
Gold	Mariel Merlii Pulles	(United States) 2023 Lake Placid	Cross-country skiing	15 kilometre freestyle
Silver	Mariel Merlii Pulles	(United States) 2023 Lake Placid	Cross-country skiing	5 kilometre classical
Silver	Mariel Merlii Pulles	(United States) 2023 Lake Placid	Cross-country skiing	5 kilometre freestyle pursuit

== See also ==
- Estonia at the Olympics
