= Cycling at the 2011 Summer Universiade – Men's road race =

The men's road race was one of the cycling events at the 2011 Summer Universiade in Shenzhen, China. It took place on 13 August 2011, featuring 73 men from 18 countries and was held over 156.8 km distance.

== Results ==
Rank	Rider	Nationality	Time
1st	Bernhard Oberholzer	Switzerland	3:50.22
2nd	Patrick Schelling	Switzerland	"
3rd	Genki Yamamoto	Japan	3:50.46
4th	Masanori Noguchi	Japan	3:51.58
5th	Maksim Kozyrev	Russia	"
6th	Jiri Hudecek	Czech Republic	"
7th	Valery Kaykov	Russia	3:52.12
8th	Martynas Maniusis	Lithuania	3:52.16
9th	Christiaan Kriek	South Africa	"
10th	Patrik Tybor	Slovakia	3:52.20
11th	Chan-Jae Jang	South Korea	"
12th	Lionel Wust	Switzerland	"
13th	Chunkai Feng	Chinese Taipei	"
14th	Nico Schneider	Germany	"
15th	Mihkel Ronimois	Estonia	"
16th	Christian Andres	Switzerland	"
17th	Naran Khangarid	Mongolia	"
18th	Mohd Akmal Amrun	Malaysia	"
19th	Dion Beukeboom	Netherlands	"
20th	Alex Wong	Australia	"
21st	Abraham Jozua Le Roux	South Africa	"
22nd	Hayato Yoshida	Japan	3:52.31
23rd	Marek Mixa	Czech Republic	"
24th	Vismantas Mockevicius	Lithuania	"
25th	Kazushige Kuboki	Japan	"
26th	Muhd Rauf Nur Misbah	Malaysia	"
27th	Jamsran Ulziibaatar	Mongolia	"
28th	Eric Sheppard	Australia	"
29th	Daniel Westmattelmann	Germany	3:52.42
30th	Ryu Sasaki	Japan	3:52.52
31st	Martin Kostelnicak	Slovakia	3:55.52
32nd	Fanhsin Chu	Chinese Taipei	"
	Martin Hunal	Czech Republic	OTL
	Radek Krummer	Czech Republic	OTL
	Matthew Sherwin	Australia	DNF
	Tomas Okrouhlicky	Czech Republic	DNF
	Rauno Miilmann	Estonia	DNF
	Christoph Pfingsten	Germany	DNF
	Grischa Janorschke	Germany	DNF
	Mathias Belka	Germany	DNF
	Jang Sunjae	South Korea	DNF
	Lee Tackmo	South Korea	DNF
	Park Sungbaek	South Korea	DNF
	Im Jaeyeon	South Korea	DNF
	Audrius Zemaitaitis	Lithuania	DNF
	Vladimiras Kokorevas	Lithuania	DNF
	Altanzul Altansukh	Mongolia	DNF
	Altanzul Maani	Mongolia	DNF
	Tuulkhangai Tuguldur	Mongolia	DNF
	Lars van de Vall	Netherlands	DNF
	Matthew Mancao	Northern Mariana Islands	DNF
	Emil Unaas	Norway	DNF
	Brad Evans	New Zealand	DNF
	Sergey Shilov	Russia	DNF
	Kirill Sveshnikov	Russia	DNF
	Artur Ershov	Russia	DNF
	Edward Murray Greene	South Africa	DNF
	Carel Jacob Johannes Steynberg	South Africa	DNF
	Lance Muller	South Africa	DNF
	Hsiao Shihhsin	Chinese Taipei	DNF
	Hu Chewei	Chinese Taipei	DNF
	Liu Shiming	Chinese Taipei	DNF
