= 2009 European Athletics U23 Championships – Men's 100 metres =

The men's 100 metres event at the 2009 European Athletics U23 Championships was held in Kaunas, Lithuania, at S. Dariaus ir S. Girėno stadionas (Darius and Girėnas Stadium) on 16 and 17 July.

== Medalists ==
Gold	Harry Aikines-Aryeetey; United Kingdom
Silver	Leevan Yearwood; United Kingdom
Bronze	Rion Pierre; United Kingdom

== Results ==
=== Final ===
17 July
Wind: 1.5 m/s

Rank	Name	Nationality	Time	Notes
1st place, gold medalist(s)	Harry Aikines-Aryeetey	United Kingdom	10.15	
2nd place, silver medalist(s)	Leevan Yearwood	United Kingdom	10.26	
3rd place, bronze medalist(s)	Rion Pierre	United Kingdom	10.28	
4	Rytis Sakalauskas	Lithuania	10.38	
5	Aggelos Aggelakis	Greece	10.45	
6	Giovanni Codrington	Netherlands	10.51	
7	Olaf Paruzel	Poland	10.54	
8	Teddy Tinmar	France	10.58	

=== Heats ===
16 July
Qualified: first 2 in each heat and 2 best to Final

==== Heat 1 ====
Wind: 1.3 m/s

Rank	Name	Nationality	Time	Notes
1	Harry Aikines-Aryeetey	United Kingdom	10.32	Q
2	Giovanni Codrington	Netherlands	10.57	Q
3	Jason Smyth	Ireland	10.60	
4	Pascal Mancini	Switzerland	10.61	
5	Miloš Savić	Serbia	10.68	
6	Aivaras Pranckevičius	Lithuania	10.77	
7	Kaba Bemba	France	10.82	
8	Davide Deimichei	Italy	10.85	

==== Heat 2 ====
Wind: -0.3 m/s

Rank	Name	Nationality	Time	Notes
1	Leevan Yearwood	United Kingdom	10.42	Q
2	Rytis Sakalauskas	Lithuania	10.47	Q
3	Olaf Paruzel	Poland	10.52	q
4	Aggelos Aggelakis	Greece	10.53	q
5	Charles Figaro	France	10.71	
6	José Antonio Andújar	Spain	10.84	
7	Philippos Spastris	Cyprus	11.03	

==== Heat 3 ====
Wind: -0.7 m/s

Rank	Name	Nationality	Time	Notes
1	Rion Pierre	United Kingdom	10.46	Q
2	Teddy Tinmar	France	10.61	Q
3	Gavino Giacomo Dettori	Italy	10.80	
4	Paweł Stempel	Poland	10.80	
5	Edi Sousa	Portugal	10.85	
6	Matúš Mentel	Slovakia	10.89	
	Martynas Jurgilas	Lithuania	DNS	

== Participation ==
According to an unofficial count, 21 athletes from 14 countries participated in the event.

- Cyprus (1)
- France (3)
- Greece (1)
- Ireland (1)
- Italy (2)
- Lithuania (2)
- Netherlands (1)
- Poland (2)
- Portugal (1)
- Serbia (1)
- Slovakia (1)
- Spain (1)
- Switzerland (1)
- United Kingdom (3)
