= Argentina at the 2015 Summer Universiade =

- IOC code: ARG
- NOC: Comité Olímpico Argentino
- Website: http://www.coarg.org.ar/

in Gwangju, South Korea 3 – 14 July 2015
- Competitors: 82 in 15 sports
- Medals Ranked 62nd: Gold 0 Silver 0 Bronze 1 Total 1

Summer Universiade appearances (overview)
- 1985; 1987; 1989; 1991; 1993; 1995; 1997; 1999; 2001; 2003; 2005; 2007; 2009; 2011; 2013; 2015; 2017; 2019; 2021; 2025; 2027

Argentina participated at the 2015 Summer Universiade in Gwangju, South Korea.

== Medal summary ==
=== Medal by sports ===
Sport	1st place, gold medalist(s)	2nd place, silver medalist(s)	3rd place, bronze medalist(s)	Total
Volleyball	0	0	1	1
Total	0	0	1	1

=== Medalists ===
Medal	Name	Sport	Event	Date
Bronze	Mariano Vildosola; Juan Riganti; Patricio Vera; R. Alejandro Toro; Ignacio Fernandez; Facundo Imhoff; Ivan Postemsky; Juan Villarruel; Bruno Vinti; Fernando Arpajou; Ramiro Benitez; A Manuel Leskiw	Volleyball	Men's Volleyball	12 July
