= Dmytro Teryomenko =

Ukrainian volleyball player

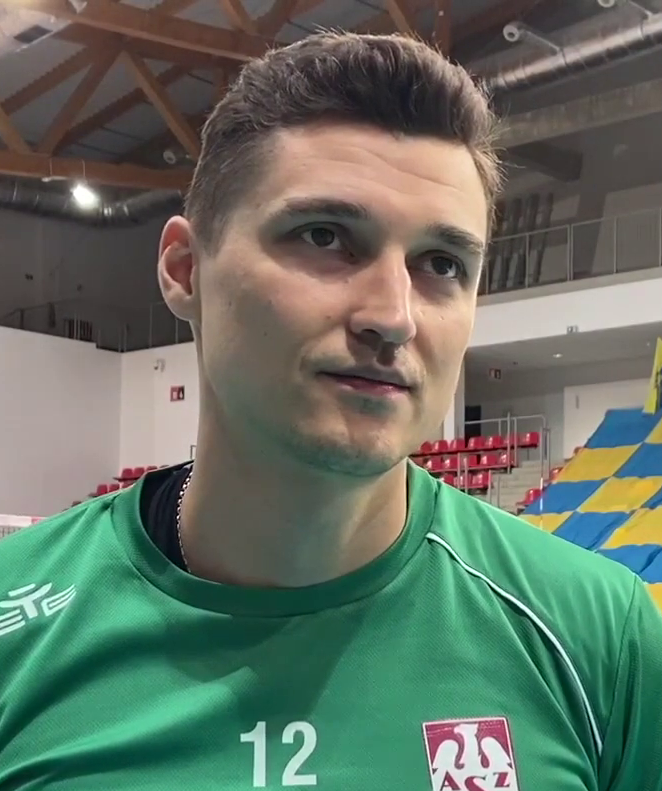
- Teryomenko in 2021

Personal information
- Full name: Dmytro Vasylovych Teryomenko
- Nationality: Ukrainian
- Born: 1 February 1987 (age 39); Kupiansk, Soviet Union, Ukraine
- Height: 2.00 m (6 ft 7 in)
- Weight: 98 kg (216 lb)
- Spike: 352 cm (139 in)
- Block: 338 cm (133 in)

Volleyball information
- Position: Middle blocker
- Current club: Tours VB
- Number: 12

Career
| Years | Teams |
|---|---|
| 2006–2016; 2016–2017; 2017–2018; 2018–2020; 2020–2021; 2021– | Lokomotiv Kharkiv; Belogorie Belgorod; Czarni Radom; Tours VB; AZS Olsztyn; Tours VB |

National team
| Ukraine |

Dmytro Vasylovych Teryomenko (Ukrainian: Дмитро Васильович Терьоменко; born 1 February 1987) is a Ukrainian professional volleyball player who plays as a middle blocker for Tours VB and the Ukraine national team.

== Honours ==
=== Club ===
- CEV Cup
  - 2021–22 – with Tours VB
- Domestic
  - 2006–07 Ukrainian Cup, with Lokomotiv Kharkiv
  - 2006–07 Ukrainian Championship, with Lokomotiv Kharkiv
  - 2007–08 Ukrainian Cup, with Lokomotiv Kharkiv
  - 2008–09 Ukrainian Cup, with Lokomotiv Kharkiv
  - 2008–09 Ukrainian Championship, with Lokomotiv Kharkiv
  - 2009–10 Ukrainian Cup, with Lokomotiv Kharkiv
  - 2009–10 Ukrainian Championship, with Lokomotiv Kharkiv
  - 2010–11 Ukrainian Cup, with Lokomotiv Kharkiv
  - 2010–11 Ukrainian Championship, with Lokomotiv Kharkiv
  - 2011–12 Ukrainian Cup, with Lokomotiv Kharkiv
  - 2011–12 Ukrainian Championship, with Lokomotiv Kharkiv
  - 2012–13 Ukrainian Cup, with Lokomotiv Kharkiv
  - 2012–13 Ukrainian Championship, with Lokomotiv Kharkiv
  - 2013–14 Ukrainian Cup, with Lokomotiv Kharkiv
  - 2013–14 Ukrainian Championship, with Lokomotiv Kharkiv
  - 2014–15 Ukrainian Cup, with Lokomotiv Kharkiv
  - 2014–15 Ukrainian Championship, with Lokomotiv Kharkiv
  - 2015–16 Ukrainian Cup, with Lokomotiv Kharkiv
  - 2015–16 Ukrainian Championship, with Lokomotiv Kharkiv
  - 2018–19 French Cup, with Tours VB
  - 2018–19 French Championship, with Tours VB
  - 2022–23 French Cup, with Tours VB
  - 2022–23 French Championship, with Tours VB

=== Universiade ===
- 2015 Summer Universiade

=== Individual awards ===
- 2016: Ukrainian Championship – Most valuable player
- 2016: Ukrainian Championship – Best middle blocker
