= Australia at the FISU World University Games =

Australia at the Universiade
- IOC code: AUS
- Medals: Gold 62 Silver 55 Bronze 84 Total 201

Australia at the Summer Universiade has participated in all editions held since the fifth edition of 1967 Summer Universiade.

== Medal count ==
Australia won 202 medals in 26 appearances at the Summer Universiade and are at the 18th rank in the all-time Summer Universiade medal table.

| Edition | | | | |
|---|---|---|---|---|
| (Italy) Turin 1959 | did not participate | | | |
| (Bulgaria) Sofia 1961 | did not participate | | | |
| (Brazil) Porto Alegre 1963 | did not participate | | | |
| (Hungary) Budapest 1965 | did not participate | | | |
| (Japan) Tokyo 1967 | 2 | 0 | 4 | 6 |
| (Italy) Turin 1970 | 0 | 1 | 0 | 1 |
| (Soviet Union) Moscow 1973 | 0 | 1 | 3 | 4 |
| (Italy) Rome 1975 | 0 | 0 | 0 | 0 |
| (Bulgaria) Sofia 1977 | 0 | 0 | 0 | 0 |
| Mexico City 1979 | 1 | 0 | 1 | 2 |
| (Romania) Bucarest 1981 | 0 | 1 | 0 | 1 |
| (Canada) Edmonton 1983 | 2 | 1 | 2 | 5 |
| (Japan) Kobe 1985 | 2 | 3 | 2 | 7 |
| (Socialist Federal Republic of Yugoslavia) Zagreb 1987 | 1 | 1 | 0 | 2 |
| (West Germany) Duisburg 1989 | 0 | 0 | 3 | 3 |
| (United Kingdom) Sheffield 1991 | 2 | 3 | 2 | 7 |
| (United States) Buffalo 1993 | 2 | 0 | 2 | 4 |
| (Japan) Fukuoka 1995 | 1 | 2 | 3 | 6 |
| (Italy) Sicily 1997 | 2 | 3 | 5 | 10 |
| (Spain) Palma de Mallorca 1999 | 3 | 3 | 2 | 8 |
| (China) Beijing 2001 | 3 | 1 | 2 | 6 |
| (South Korea) Daegu 2003 | 2 | 5 | 5 | 12 |
| (Turkey) Izmir 2005 | 0 | 1 | 3 | 4 |
| (Thailand) Bangkok 2007 | 3 | 5 | 3 | 11 |
| (Serbia) Belgrade 2009 | 5 | 2 | 1 | 8 |
| (China) Shenzhen 2011 | 5 | 3 | 8 | 16 |
| (Russia) Kazan 2013 | 6 | 4 | 6 | 16 |
| (South Korea) Gwangju 2015 | 4 | 3 | 12 | 19 |
| Taipei 2017 | 4 | 3 | 2 | 9 |
| (Italy) Naples 2019 | 6 | 5 | 6 | 17 |
| (China) Chengdu 2021 | 1 | 1 | 3 | 5 |
| (Germany) Rhine-Rühr 2025 | 5 | 3 | 4 | 13 |
| Total | 62 | 55 | 84 | 201 |

== See also ==
- Australia at the Olympics
- Australia at the Paralympics
- Australia at the Commonwealth Games
