= Estonia at the 2019 Summer Universiade =

- IOC code: EST
- National federation: Eesti Akadeemiline Spordiliit

in Naples, Italy 3 – 14 July 2019
- Competitors: 51
- Medals Ranked 35th: Gold 1 Silver 0 Bronze 1 Total 2

Summer Universiade appearances (overview)
- 1993; 1995; 1997; 1999; 2001; 2003; 2005; 2007; 2009; 2011; 2013; 2015; 2017; 2019; 2021

Estonia participated at the 2019 Summer Universiade in Naples, Italy from 3 to 14 July 2019. A total of 51 athletes competed. Estonia won 1 gold and 1 bronze medal.

== Medalists ==
Medal	Name	Sport	Event
Gold	Lisell Jäätma; Robin Jäätma	Archery	Mixed team compound
Bronze	Viktoria Bogdanova	Gymnastics	Women's rhythmic individual ball
