= Argentina at the 2021 Summer World University Games =

- Flag of Argentina
- IOC code: ARG

in Chengdu, China 28 July 2023 – 8 August 2023
- Competitors: 54 (26 men and 28 women)
- Medals: Gold 0 Silver 0 Bronze 0 Total 0

Summer World University Games appearances
- 1985; 1987; 1989; 1991; 1993; 1995; 1997; 1999; 2001; 2003; 2005; 2007; 2009; 2011; 2013; 2015; 2017; 2019; 2021; 2025; 2027

Argentina competed at the 2021 Summer World University Games in Chengdu, China, held from 28 July to 8 August 2023.

== Competitors ==
Sport	Men	Women	Total
Artistic gymnastics	1	2	3
Athletics	0	1	1
Basketball	11	11	22
Judo	1	0	1
Rhythmic gymnastics	0	1	1
Rowing	1	0	1
Swimming	0	1	1
Volleyball	12	12	24
Total	26	28	54

== Artistic gymnastics ==
Men

Athlete	Event	Qualification								Final							
Athlete	Event	Apparatus						Total	Rank	Apparatus						Total	Rank
Athlete	Event	F	PH	R	V	PB	HB	Total	Rank	F	PH	R	V	PB	HB	Total	Rank
Julián Jato	All-around	12.566	9.533	12.566	13.200	12.266	11.200	71.331	53	Did not advance							

Women

Athlete	Event	Qualification						Final					
Athlete	Event	Apparatus				Total	Rank	Apparatus				Total	Rank
Athlete	Event	V	UB	F	BB	Total	Rank	V	UB	F	BB	Total	Rank
Lara Demarsico	All-around	11.666	10.733	11.633	11.366	45.398	24	Did not advance					
Faustina Pascucci	All-around	11.600	11.000	10.066	11.233	43.899	29	Did not advance					
Faustina Pascucci	Vault	10.750	—N/a			10.750	17	Did not advance					

== Athletics ==
Women

Athlete	Event	Heat		Semi-finals		Final	
Athlete	Event	Result	Rank	Result	Rank	Result	Rank
Candela Belaustegui	100 metres hurdles	15.09	25	Did not advance			
Candela Belaustegui	400 metres hurdles	1:04.84	22	Did not advance			

== Basketball ==
Summary

Team	Event	Group stage				Quarter-finals	Semi-finals	Final / BM	
Team	Event	Opponent score	Opponent score	Opponent score	Rank	Opponent score	Opponent score	Opponent score	Rank
(Argentina) Men's team	Men's tournament	South Africa (RSA); W 102–36	Romania (ROU); W 70–56	Mongolia (MGL); W 84–71	1 Q	Lithuania (LTU); W 78–75	Czech Republic (CZE); L 68–85	United States (USA); L 91–102	4
(Argentina) Women's team	Women's tournament	Hungary (HUN); L 49–63	Japan (JPN); L 56–100	—N/a	3	9th to 12th place classification			10
(Argentina) Women's team	Women's tournament	Hungary (HUN); L 49–63	Japan (JPN); L 56–100	—N/a	3	Portugal (POR); L 56–68	Slovakia (SVK); W 86–80 (OT)	Romania (ROU); W 67–40	10

== Judo ==
Men

Athlete	Event	Round of 32	Round of 16	Quarter-finals	Semi-finals	Repechage	Final / BM	
Athlete	Event	Opponent score	Opponent score	Opponent score	Opponent score	Opponent score	Opponent score	Rank
Gianfranco Monteagudo	Men's 66 kg	Chang (CHN); W 10–00	Saidaburorov (TJK); L 01–10	Did not advance				

== Rhythmic gymnastics ==
Athlete	Event	Apparatus				Total	Rank
Athlete	Event	Hoop (rhythmic gymnastics)	Ball (rhythmic gymnastics)	Clubs (rhythmic gymnastics)	Ribbon (rhythmic gymnastics)	Total	Rank
Martina Gil	Individual All-around	27.150	21.850	20.600	22.950	88.850	26

== Rowing ==
Men

Athlete	Event	Heats		Repechage		Semi-finals		Finals	
Athlete	Event	Time	Rank	Time	Rank	Time	Rank	Time	Rank
Matias Arana	Single sculls	7:29.38	3 R	7:28.50	3 SA	7:38.74	6 FB	7:29.88	11

== Swimming ==
Women

Athlete	Event	Heat		Semi-finals		Final	
Athlete	Event	Time	Rank	Time	Rank	Time	Rank
Brisa Kaniuka	200 metre freestyle	2:26.30	30	Did not advance			
Brisa Kaniuka	400 metre freestyle	5:06.77	26	—N/a		Did not advance	
Brisa Kaniuka	50 metre backstroke	34.12	30	Did not advance			
Brisa Kaniuka	100 metre backstroke	1:15.47	31	Did not advance			
Brisa Kaniuka	100 metre butterfly	2:42.56	25	Did not advance			

== Volleyball ==
Summary

Team	Event	Group stage				Quarter-finals	Semi-finals	Final / BM	
Team	Event	Opponent score	Opponent score	Opponent score	Rank	Opponent score	Opponent score	Opponent score	Rank
(Argentina) Men's team	Men's tournament	India (IND); W 3–0	Czech Republic (CZE); W 3–0	Iran (IRI); W 3–0	1 Q	Italy (ITA); L 1–3	Portugal (POR); W 3–0	Germany (GER); W 3–0	5
(Argentina) Women's team	Women's tournament	China (CHN); L 0–3	Germany (GER); L 0–3	—N/a	3	—N/a	Colombia (COL); W 3–0	Chinese Taipei (TPE); L 0–3	10
