= Volleyball at the 2015 Summer Universiade =

Volleyball at the XXVIII Summer Universiade
- Venue: various
- Dates: July 2, 2015 – July 12, 2015
- Teams: 21 (men); 16 (women)

Volleyball was contested at the 2015 Summer Universiade from July 2 to 12 in Gwangju, South Korea.

== Medal summary ==
=== Medal table ===
Rank	Nation	Gold	Silver	Bronze	Total
1	Russia (RUS)	2	0	0	2
2	Ukraine (UKR)	0	2	0	2
3	Argentina (ARG)	0	0	1	1
3	Japan (JPN)	0	0	1	1
Totals (4 entries)		2	2	2	6

=== Medal events ===
Event	Gold	Silver	Bronze
Men	Russia (RUS); Pavel Pankov; Ilia Vlasov; Dmitry Kovalev; Egor Feoktistov; Ilyas Kurkaev; Alexander Markin; Igor Philippov; Aleksei Kabeshov; Alexander Kimerov; Maksim Zhigalov; Egor Kliuka; Sergei Nikitin	Ukraine (UKR); Pylyp Harmash; Yurii Synytsia; Dmytro Bogdan; Oleksiy Klyamar; Mykola Moroz; Maksym Drozd; Dmytro Shorkin; Yuriy Tomyn; Sergiy Tyutlin; Dmytro Teryomenko; Oleg Shevchenko; Oleksandr Dmytriev	Argentina (ARG); Mariano Vildosola; Juan Riganti; Patricio Vera; Alejandro Toro; Ignacio Fernandez; Facundo Imhoff; Ivan Postemsky; Juan Villarruel; Bruno Vinti; Fernando Arpajou; Ramiro Benitez; Manuel Leskiw
Women	Russia (RUS); Svetlana Serbina; Anastasiia Barchuk; Anastasia Bavykina; Ekaterina Romanenko; Daria Pisarenko; Daria Isaeva; Irina Zaryazhko; Irina Filishtinskaia; Anastasia Chernaya; Irina Malkova; Irina Voronkova; Olesya Nikolaeva	Ukraine (UKR); Ganna Lisieienkova; Anna Stepaniuk; Diana Karpets; Kateryna Kalchenko; Anastasiia Chernukha; Viktoriya Delros; Maryna Degtiarova; Svitlana Dorsman; Angelina Dubianska; Kateryna Dudnyk; Oksana Madzar adiia Kodola	Japan (JPN); Naoko Yataka; Misaki Tanaka; Mai Shimizu; Kiyora Obikawa; Nao Muranaga; Yuka Imamura; Momoka Oda; Kasumi Nakaya; Misaki Yamauchi; Manami Kojima; Arisa Inoue; Tomomi Ishibashi

== Men ==
Twenty-one teams participated in the men's tournament.

=== Teams ===
Pool A

- South Korea
- Czech Republic
- Australia
- United States
- Argentina
- Chinese Taipei

Pool B

- Russia
- Canada
- Thailand
- Switzerland
- Iran

Pool C

- Japan
- Brazil
- Chile
- Hong Kong
- Colombia

Pool D

- Ukraine
- Latvia
- Mexico
- China
- Venezuela

== Women ==
Sixteen teams participated in the women's tournament.

=== Teams ===
Pool A

- South Korea
- Chile
- China
- Colombia

Pool B

- Russia
- Chinese Taipei
- Ukraine
- Switzerland

Pool C

- Brazil
- Japan
- United States
- Finland

Pool D

- Thailand
- Canada
- Turkey
- Zimbabwe
