= Estonia at the 2017 Summer Universiade =

- IOC code: EST
- National federation: Eesti Akadeemiline Spordiliit

in Taipei, Taiwan 19 August 2017 – 30 August 2017
- Competitors: 86 (51 men and 35 women) in 11 sports
- Medals Ranked 53rd: Gold 0 Silver 1 Bronze 0 Total 1

Summer Universiade appearances (overview)
- 1993; 1995; 1997; 1999; 2001; 2003; 2005; 2007; 2009; 2011; 2013; 2015; 2017; 2019; 2021; 2025; 2027

Estonia participated at the 2017 Summer Universiade in Taipei, Taiwan, from 19 to 30 August 2017.

== Medal summary ==
Medal	Name	Sport	Event
Silver	Juhan Mettis	Judo	Men's Open

== Team ==
Competitors from Estonia per sport
Sport	Men	Women	Total
Archery	2	4	6
Athletics	9	13	22
Badminton	6	3	9
Basketball	12	0	12
Fencing	2	4	6
Judo	4	0	4
Swimming	8	7	15
Table tennis	5	4	9
Taekwondo	1	0	1
Tennis	1	0	1
Weightlifting	1	0	1
Total	51	35	86
