= Azerbaijan at the FISU World University Games =

Azerbaijan at the Universiade
- IOC code: AZE

Summer appearances
- 1959−1983; 1995; 1997; 1999; 2001; 2003; 2005; 2007; 2009; 2011; 2013; 2015; 2017

Winter appearances
- 1960−2005; 2007; 2009; 2011; 2013; 2015; 2017

Azerbaijan participates at the Universiade.

== Medal count ==
=== Medals by Summer Universiade ===
Azerbaijan has won 40 medals in appearances at the Summer Universiade and is at the 41st rank in the all-time Summer Universiade medal table.

Year	Place					Rank
1993	United States, Buffalo	0	0	0	0	-
1995	Japan, Fukuoka	0	0	0	0	-
1997	Italy, Sicily	0	0	0	0	-
1999	Spain, Palma de Mallorca	0	0	0	0	-
2001	China, Beijing	0	1	0	1	38
2003	South Korea, Daegu	0	0	0	0	-
2005	Turkey, İzmir	0	0	2	2	55
2007	Thailand, Bangkok	1	0	0	1	45
2009	Serbia, Belgrade	2	0	0	2	28
2011	China, Shenzhen	0	2	0	2	45
2013	Russia, Kazan	3	4	7	14	21
2015	South Korea, Gwangju	2	0	1	3	27
2017	Chinese Taipei, Taipei	3	1	4	8	24
2019	Italy, Naples	2	3	2	7	18
2021	China, Chengdu	0	3	6	9	38
Total		13	14	22	49	42

=== Medals by Winter Universiade ===
Azerbaijan has won 1 medal in appearances at the Winter Universiade and are at the 40th rank in the all-time Summer Universiade medal table.

Edition				
Total	0	1	0	1

== See also ==
- Azerbaijan at the Olympics
- Azerbaijan at the Paralympics
