= Ganna Kyrychenko =

Ukrainian volleyball player (born 1991)

Hanna Kyrychenko
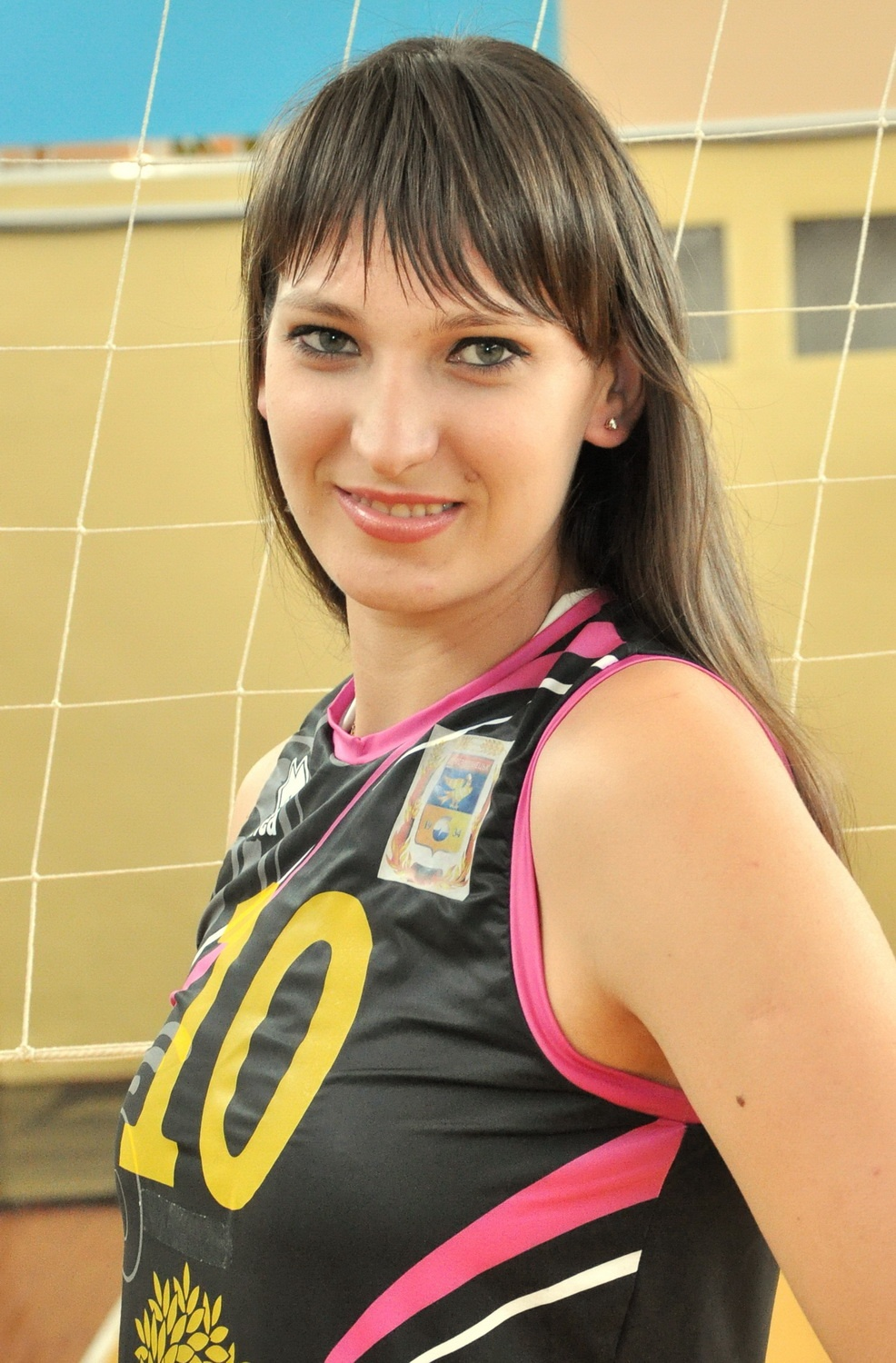
- Kyrychenko in 2015

Personal information
- Nationality: Ukrainian
- Born: 26 February 1991 (age 35)
- Height: 188 cm (6 ft 2 in)
- Weight: 80 kg (176 lb)

Volleyball information
- Position: right side hitter

National team
2011	Ukraine
Honours
Summer Universiade
Silver medal – second place	2015 Summer Universiade	Team
Bronze medal – third place	2017 Summer Universiade	Team

Hanna Kyrychenko (Ukrainian: Ганна Кириченко) also spelled Ganna, née Ganna Lisieienkova (born 26 February 1991) is a Ukrainian female volleyball player, playing as a right side hitter.

She was part of the Ukraine women's national volleyball team. She competed at the 2011 Women's European Volleyball Championship, the 2015 Summer Universiade, the 2017 Summer Universiade and the 2017 Women's European Volleyball Championship.
