= Estonia at the 2013 Summer Universiade =

- IOC code: EST
- National federation: Eesti Akadeemiline Spordiliit

in Kazan 6 July 2013 – 17 July 2013
- Competitors: 131 in 17 sports
- Medals Ranked 62nd: Gold 0 Silver 0 Bronze 1 Total 1

Summer Universiade appearances (overview)
- 1993; 1995; 1997; 1999; 2001; 2003; 2005; 2007; 2009; 2011; 2013; 2015; 2017; 2019; 2021; 2025; 2027

Estonia competed at the 2013 Summer Universiade in Kazan, Russia from 6 to 17 July 2013. A total of 131 Estonian athletes participated in 17 sports.

== Medalists ==
Medal	Name	Sport	Event
Bronze	Anna Iljuštšenko	Athletics	Women's high jump

== Basketball ==
Estonia qualified men's team.

=== Men ===
The men's team participated in Group A.

== Football ==
Estonia qualified women's team.

=== Women ===
The women's team participated in Pool C.

== Volleyball ==
Estonia qualified men's team.

=== Men ===
The men's team participated in Group A.
