= Volleyball at the 2021 Summer World University Games – Men's tournament =

Volleyball at the Chengdu 2021 FISU World University Games
- Venue: various
- Dates: 29 July - 7 August 2023
- Teams: 16

The Men`s Volleyball at the 2021 Summer World University Games in Chengdu was played from 29 July to 7 August 2023. Twenty-eight teams participated in the tournament. The indoor volleyball matches was played at the University of Electronic Sciences and Technology of China Guanghua Campus Gymnasium, Xipu Campus Gymnasium, Xihua University Gymnasium, and Chengdu University Gymnasium.

== Pool standing procedure ==
1. Number of matches won
2. Match points
3. Sets ratio
4. Points ratio
5. If the tie continues as per the point ratio between two teams, the priority will be given to the team which won the last match between them. When the tie in points ratio is between three or more teams, a new classification of these teams in the terms of points 1, 2 and 3 will be made taking into consideration only the matches in which they were opposed to each other.

Match won 3–0 or 3–1: 3 match points for the winner, 0 match points for the loser
Match won 3–2: 2 match points for the winner, 1 match point for the loser

== Preliminary round ==
- All times are China Standard Time (UTC+08:00)

=== Pool A ===
Pos	Team	Pld	W	L	Pts	SW	SL	SR	SPW	SPL	SPR	Qualification
1	Poland	3	3	0	9	9	0	MAX	225	144	1.563	Quarterfinals
2	Portugal	3	2	1	6	6	4	1.500	222	237	0.937	Quarterfinals
3	South Korea	3	1	2	3	4	6	0.667	222	215	1.033	9–16th place quarterfinals
4	Hong Kong	3	0	3	0	0	9	0.000	156	229	0.681	9–16th place quarterfinals

Source: Chengdu 2021

Date	Time		Score		Set 1	Set 2	Set 3	Set 4	Set 5	Total	Report
29 Jul	17:30	Portugal	0–3	Poland	12–25	15–25	20–25			47–75	
29 Jul	17:30	South Korea	3–0	Hong Kong	25–13	25–19	25–12			75–44	
30 Jul	15:00	Poland	3–0	Hong Kong	25–11	25–19	25–14			75–44	
31 Jul	15:00	Portugal	3–1	South Korea	19–25	25–22	25–22	27–25		96–94	
2 Aug	20:00	South Korea	0–3	Poland	17–25	15–25	21–25			53–75	
2 Aug	20:00	Portugal	3–0	Hong Kong	25–22	29–27	25–19			79–68	

=== Pool B ===
Pos	Team	Pld	W	L	Pts	SW	SL	SR	SPW	SPL	SPR	Qualification
1	Argentina	3	3	0	9	9	0	MAX	246	195	1.262	Quarterfinals
2	Iran	3	1	2	4	5	6	0.833	263	248	1.060	Quarterfinals
3	India	3	1	2	3	3	7	0.429	209	226	0.925	9–16th place quarterfinals
4	Czech Republic	3	1	2	2	4	8	0.500	227	276	0.822	9–16th place quarterfinals

Source: Chengdu 2021

Date	Time		Score		Set 1	Set 2	Set 3	Set 4	Set 5	Total	Report
29 Jul	17:30	Czech Republic	3–2	Iran	17–25	25–22	19–25	25–23	15–13	101–108	
29 Jul	20:00	Argentina	3–0	India	25–19	27–25	25–19			77–63	
31 Jul	17:30	Czech Republic	0–3	Argentina	16–25	18–25	18–25			52–75	
31 Jul	17:30	Iran	3–0	India	25–19	25–16	25–18			75–53	
2 Aug	17:30	Argentina	3–0	Iran	25–19	44–42	25–19			94–80	
2 Aug	20:00	Czech Republic	1–3	India	17–25	25–18	15–25	17–25		74–93	

=== Pool C ===
Pos	Team	Pld	W	L	Pts	SW	SL	SR	SPW	SPL	SPR	Qualification
1	China	3	3	0	9	9	0	MAX	235	178	1.320	Quarterfinals
2	Ukraine	3	2	1	6	6	4	1.500	217	225	0.964	Quarterfinals
3	Japan	3	1	2	3	4	6	0.667	238	229	1.039	9–16th place quarterfinals
4	Azerbaijan	3	0	3	0	0	9	0.000	17	225	0.076	9–16th place quarterfinals

Source: Chengdu 2021

Date	Time		Score		Set 1	Set 2	Set 3	Set 4	Set 5	Total	Report
29 Jul	20:00	Japan	0–3	China	33–35	19–25	23–25			75–85	
29 Jul	20:50	Azerbaijan	0–3	Ukraine	21–25	20–25	21–25			62–75	
31 Jul	17:30	Japan	3–0	Azerbaijan	25–17	25–14	25–18			75–49	
31 Jul	20:00	China	3–0	Ukraine	25–20	25–18	25–9			75–47	
2 Aug	17:30	Japan	1–3	Ukraine	23–25	25–20	20–25	20–25		88–95	
2 Aug	20:00	Azerbaijan	0–3	China	17–25	20–25	19–25			56–75	

=== Pool D ===
Pos	Team	Pld	W	L	Pts	SW	SL	SR	SPW	SPL	SPR	Qualification
1	Germany	3	3	0	8	9	2	4.500	265	235	1.128	Quarterfinals
2	Italy	3	2	1	7	8	3	2.667	254	203	1.251	Quarterfinals
3	Chinese Taipei	3	1	2	3	3	6	0.500	186	202	0.921	9–16th place quarterfinals
4	Brazil	3	0	3	0	0	9	0.000	193	238	0.811	9–16th place quarterfinals

Source: Chengdu 2021

Date	Time		Score		Set 1	Set 2	Set 3	Set 4	Set 5	Total	Report
29 Jul	20:00	Germany	3–0	Brazil	32–30	25–20	25–20			82–70	
29 Jul	20:00	Italy	3–0	Chinese Taipei	25–15	25–13	25–16			75–44	
31 Jul	20:00	Germany	3–2	Italy	25–20	20–25	23–25	25–21	15–13	108–104	
31 Jul	20:00	Brazil	0–3	Chinese Taipei	23–25	20–25	29–31			72–81	
2 Aug	17:00	Germany	3–0	Chinese Taipei	25–21	25–20	25–20			75–61	
2 Aug	20:00	Italy	3–0	Brazil	25–23	25–13	25–15			75–51	

== Final round ==
=== 9th–16th places ===
9th–16th quarterfinals
4 August
South Korea	3
Azerbaijan	0
4 August
Czech Republic	2
Chinese Taipei	3
4 August
Brazil	3
India	2
4 August
Hong Kong	0
Japan	3

9th–12th semifinals
5 August
South Korea	3
Chinese Taipei	2
5 August
Brazil	3
Japan	2

9th place match
6 August
South Korea	3
Brazil	0
11th place match
6 August
Chinese Taipei	0
Japan	3

13th–16th semifinals
5 August
Azerbaijan	0
Czech Republic	3
5 August
India	3
Hong Kong	1

13th place match
6 August
Czech Republic	3
India	0
15th place match
6 August
Azerbaijan	1
Hong Kong	3

==== 9–16th place quarterfinals ====
Date	Time		Score		Set 1	Set 2	Set 3	Set 4	Set 5	Total	Report
4 August	17:30	South Korea	3–0	Azerbaijan	25–21	25–17	25–19			75–57	
4 August	17:30	Brazil	3–2	India	21–25	25–23	20–25	25–19	15–13	106–105	
4 August	20:00	Czech Republic	2–3	Chinese Taipei	25–22	18–25	25–27	25–16	16–18	109–108	
4 August	20:25	Hong Kong	0–3	Japan	19–25	21–25	19–25			59–75	

==== 13–16th place semifinals ====
Date	Time		Score		Set 1	Set 2	Set 3	Set 4	Set 5	Total	Report
5 August	17:30	Azerbaijan	0–3	Czech Republic	15–25	26–28	23–25			64–78	
5 August	20:00	India	3–1	Hong Kong	19–25	26–24	26–24	25–16		96–89	

==== 9–12th place semifinals ====
Date	Time		Score		Set 1	Set 2	Set 3	Set 4	Set 5	Total	Report
5 August	15:00	South Korea	3–2	Chinese Taipei	25–17	16–25	25–23	21–25	15–7	102–97	
5 August	15:00	Brazil	3–2	Japan	25–20	27–25	18–25	15–25	16–14	101–109	

==== 15th place match ====
Date	Time		Score		Set 1	Set 2	Set 3	Set 4	Set 5	Total	Report
6 August	15:00	Azerbaijan	1–3	Hong Kong	18–25	22–25	25–18	23–25		88–93	

==== 13th place match ====
Date	Time		Score		Set 1	Set 2	Set 3	Set 4	Set 5	Total	Report
6 August	15:00	Czech Republic	3–0	India	27–25	25–13	25–16			77–54	

==== 11th place match ====
Date	Time		Score		Set 1	Set 2	Set 3	Set 4	Set 5	Total	Report
6 August	15:00	Chinese Taipei	0–3	Japan	21–25	11–25	20–25			52–75	

==== 9th place match ====
Date	Time		Score		Set 1	Set 2	Set 3	Set 4	Set 5	Total	Report
6 August	17:30	South Korea	3–0	Brazil	25–21	25–22	25–16			75–59	

=== 1st–8th places ===
Quarterfinals
4 August
Poland	3
Ukraine	0
4 August
Iran	3
Germany	2
4 August
Italy	3
Argentina	1
4 August
Portugal	0
China	3

Semifinals
5 August
Poland	3
Iran	0
5 August
Italy	3
China	0

Final
7 August
Poland	0
Italy	3
3rd place match
7 August
Iran	0
China	3

5th–8th semifinals
5 August
Ukraine	0
Germany	3
5 August
Argentina	3
Portugal	0

5th place match
6 August
Germany	0
Argentina	3
7th place match
6 August
Ukraine	2
Portugal	3

==== Quarterfinals ====
Date	Time		Score		Set 1	Set 2	Set 3	Set 4	Set 5	Total	Report
4 August	15:00	Poland	3–0	Ukraine	25–20	25–16	25–9			75–45	
4 August	15:00	Portugal	0–3	China	23–25	19–25	17–25			59–75	
4 August	17:30	Italy	3–1	Argentina	23–25	25–16	25–23	25–21		98–85	
4 August	20:05	Iran	3–2	Germany	29–27	25–27	28–26	15–25	15–13	112–118	

==== 5–8th place semifinals ====
Date	Time		Score		Set 1	Set 2	Set 3	Set 4	Set 5	Total	Report
5 August	17:30	Ukraine	0–3	Germany	18–25	22–25	14–25			54–75	
5 August	20:00	Portugal	0–3	Argentina	21–25	19–25	18–25			58–75	

==== Semifinals ====
Date	Time		Score		Set 1	Set 2	Set 3	Set 4	Set 5	Total	Report
5 August	17:30	Poland	3–0	Iran	25–21	25–22	25–11			75–54	
5 August	20:00	Italy	3–0	China	25–19	26–24	25–15			76–58	

==== 7th place match ====
Date	Time		Score		Set 1	Set 2	Set 3	Set 4	Set 5	Total	Report
6 August	15:00	Ukraine	2–3	Portugal	23–25	19–25	25–18	25–23	10–15	102–106	

==== 5th place match ====
Date	Time		Score		Set 1	Set 2	Set 3	Set 4	Set 5	Total	Report
6 August	17:30	Germany	0–3	Argentina	17–25	20–25	16–25			53–75	

==== 3rd place match ====
Date	Time		Score		Set 1	Set 2	Set 3	Set 4	Set 5	Total	Report
7 August	17:00	Iran	0–3	China	19–25	18–25	12–25			49–75	

==== Final ====
Date	Time		Score		Set 1	Set 2	Set 3	Set 4	Set 5	Total	Report
7 August	20:00	Poland	0–3	Italy	23–25	18–25	26–28			67–78	

== Final standing ==
Rank	Team
1st place, gold medalist(s)	Italy
2nd place, silver medalist(s)	Poland
3rd place, bronze medalist(s)	China
4	Iran
5	Argentina
6	Germany
7	Portugal
8	Ukraine
9	South Korea
10	Brazil
11	Japan
12	Chinese Taipei
13	Czech Republic
14	India
15	Hong Kong
16	Azerbaijan
