= Jiří Hudeček =

Czech cyclist

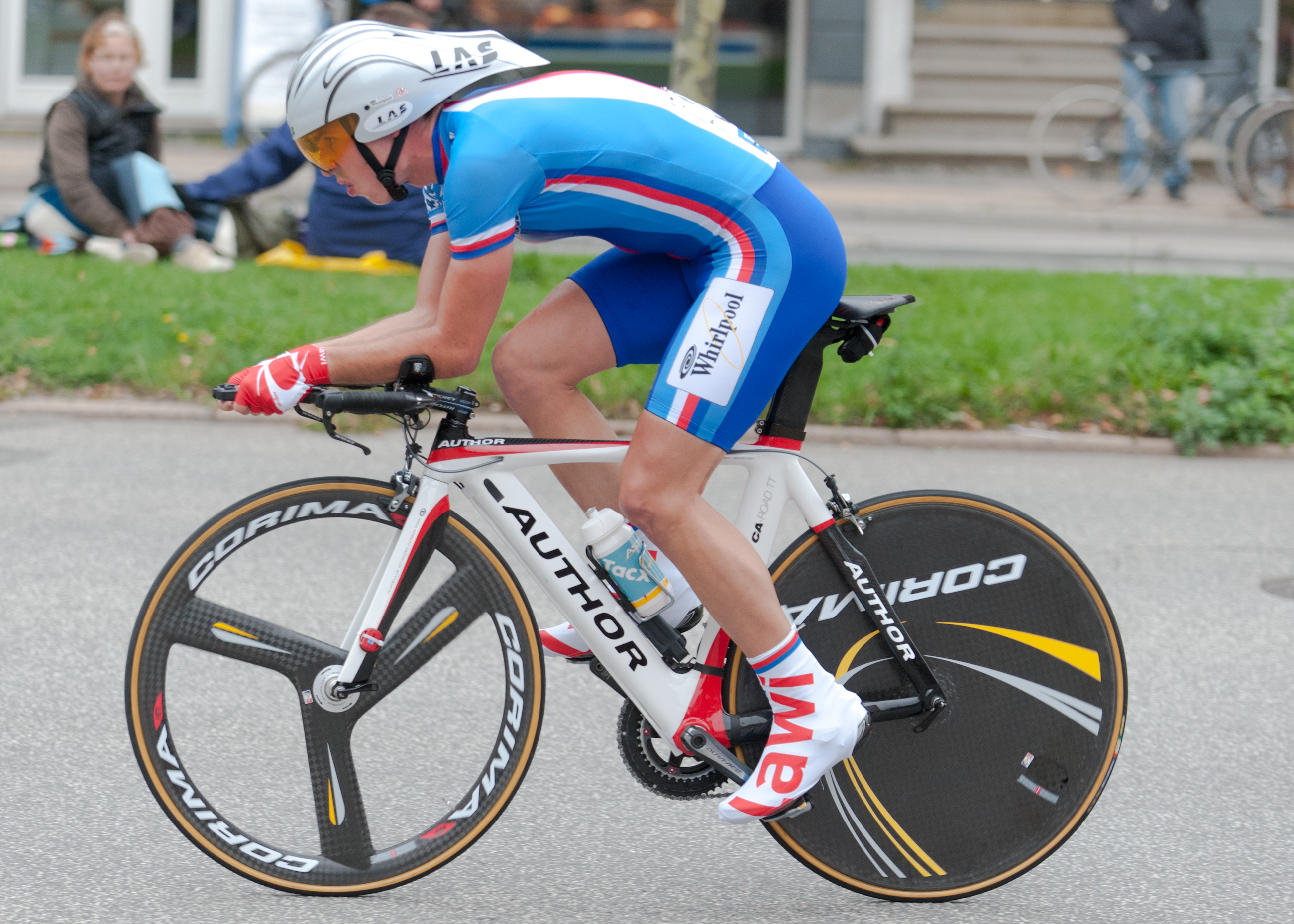

Personal information
- Born: 19 May 1986 (age 40) Lety, Czechoslovakia

Cycling career
- Sport: Cycling
- Current team: Retired
- Discipline: Road
- Role: Rider

Professional team
- 2011–2013: PSK Whirlpool–Author

Jiří Hudeček (born 19 May 1986) is a former Czech cyclist.

== Major results ==
2011
1st Time trial, National Road Championships
3rd Overall Czech Cycling Tour
6th Road race, Summer Universiade
9th Overall Okolo Slovenska
2012
1st Stage 1 Czech Cycling Tour (TTT)
4th Overall Szlakiem Grodòw Piastowskich
7th Overall Istrian Spring Trophy
2013
2nd Overall Course de la Solidarité Olympique
3rd Overall Tour of Malopolska
8th Overall Szlakiem Grodòw Piastowskich
9th Overall Okolo Slovenska
