= Czech Republic at the FISU World University Games =

Czech Republic at the World University Games
- IOC code: CZE
- National federation: Czech University Sports Association
- Website: www.caus.cz
- Medals: Gold 63 Silver 64 Bronze 98 Total 225

Summer appearances
- 1993; 1995; 1997; 1999; 2001; 2003; 2005; 2007; 2009; 2011; 2013; 2015; 2017; 2019; 2021

Winter appearances
- 1993; 1995; 1997; 1999; 2001; 2003; 2005; 2007; 2009; 2011; 2013; 2015; 2017; 2019; 2023; 2025

The Czech Republic has participated in all Summer and Winter World University Games since the dissolution of Czechoslovakia in 1993.

== Medal count ==
=== Summer World University Games ===
The Czech Republic has won 115 medals in 15 appearances at the Summer Universiade between 1993 and 2021 (2023).

Edition				
(United States) Buffalo 1993	1	3	0	4
(Japan) Fukuoka 1995	1	1	1	3
(Italy) Sicily 1997	1	4	4	9
(Spain) Palma de Mallorca 1999	4	5	4	13
(China) Beijing 2001	1	4	8	13
(South Korea) Daegu 2003	3	0	3	6
(Turkey) Ízmir 2005	2	0	2	4
(Thailand) Bangkok 2007	2	1	2	5
(Serbia) Belgrade 2009	1	1	4	6
(China) Shenzhen 2011	2	1	1	4
(Russia) Kazan 2013	2	1	4	7
(South Korea) Gwangju 2015	3	5	9	17
Taipei 2017	1	0	2	3
(Italy) Naples 2019	2	2	3	7
(China) Chengdu 2021	4	3	5	12
(Germany) 2025 Rhine-Ruhr	3	2	6	11
(South Korea) 2027 Chungcheong	future events			
(United States) 2029 North Carolina	future events			
Total	34	37	55	126

=== Winter World University Games ===
The Czech Republic has won 105 medals in 15 appearances at the Winter World University Games between 1993 and 2023.

Edition				
(Poland) Zakopane 1993	2	0	0	2
(Spain) Jaca 1995	0	2	0	2
(South Korea) Muju/Jeonju 1997	2	0	3	5
(Slovakia) Poprad Tatry 1999	0	2	1	3
(Poland) Zakopane 2001	0	0	2	2
(Italy) Tarvisio 2003	2	2	2	6
(Austria) Innsbruck/Seefeld 2005	3	2	4	9
(Italy) Turin 2007	4	4	1	9
(China) Harbin 2009	1	3	5	9
(Turkey) Erzurum 2011	2	2	3	7
(Italy) Trentino 2013	4	3	6	13
(Spain) (Slovakia) Granada/Štrbské Pleso-Osrblie 2015	3	3	5	11
(Kazakhstan) Almaty 2017	2	2	5	9
(Russia) Krasnoyarsk 2019	1	2	3	6
(United States) Lake Placid 2023	5	1	6	12
(Italy) Turin 2025	1	1	3	5
Total	32	29	49	110

== See also ==
- Czechoslovakia at the Universiade
- Czech Republic at the Olympics
- Czech Republic at the Paralympics
- Czech Republic at the European Games
