= Belgium at the 2011 Summer Universiade =

- IOC code: BEL

in Shenzhen
- Competitors: 41 in 10 sports
- Medals: Gold 0 Silver 1 Bronze 1 Total 2

Summer Universiade appearances
- 1959; 1961; 1963; 1965; 1967; 1970; 1973; 1975; 1977; 1979; 1981; 1983; 1985; 1987; 1989; 1991; 1993; 1995; 1997; 1999; 2001; 2003; 2005; 2007; 2009; 2011; 2013; 2015; 2017; 2019; 2021; 2025; 2027

Belgium competed at the 2011 Summer Universiade in Shenzhen, China.

== Medalists ==
Medal	Name	Sport	Event
Silver	Donna-Donny Truyens	Artistic Gymnastics	Men's Pommel horse
Bronze	Anne Arnouts	Cycling	Women's Road race

== Archery ==
Men

Athlete	Event	Ranking Round		Round of 128	Round of 64	Round of 32	Round of 16	Quarterfinals	Semifinals	Final
Athlete	Event	Score	Seed	Opposition Score	Opposition Score	Opposition Score	Opposition Score	Opposition Score	Opposition Score	Opposition Score
Julien Depoitier	Compound	681	21st		Bye	Polidori (ITA) (12); W 147-145	Wruck (USA) (28); L 141-143	Did not advance		
Mathias Van Bulck	Recurve	613	50th	Wong (CAN) (63); W 6-2	Ren (CHN) (15); L 2-6	Did not advance				

Women

Athlete	Event	Ranking Round		Round of 64	Round of 32	Round of 16	Quarterfinals	Semifinals	Final
Athlete	Event	Score	Seed	Opposition Score	Opposition Score	Opposition Score	Opposition Score	Opposition Score	Opposition Score
Catheline Dessoy	Compound	656	31st	Tyrtykayeva (KAZ) (34); W 138-131	Anastasio (ITA) (2); W 136-135	Avdeeva (RUS) (18); W 136-135	Nicely (USA) (10); L 136-137	Did not advance	
Sarah Prieels	Compound	670	15th	Bye	Avdeeva (RUS) (18); L 140-141	Did not advance			

Mixed

Athlete	Event	Round of 16	Quarterfinals	Semifinals	Final
Athlete	Event	Opposition Score	Opposition Score	Opposition Score	Opposition Score
Julien Depoitier; Sarah Prieels	Compound	Halimiyan Avva - Karimi (IRI); L 11 - 13	Did not advance		

== Athletics ==
Men

Athlete	Events	Heat		Semifinal		Final	
Athlete	Events	Result	Rank	Result	Rank	Result	Rank
Antoine Gillet	400 metres	47"46	25th Q	47"37	19th	Did not advance	
Michael Bultheel	400 metres hurdles	49"87	2nd Q	49"88	5th q	54"39	8th
Nils Duerinck	400 metres hurdles	51"69	16th Q	50"80	11th	Did not advance	
Florent Caelen	Half marathon					1h11'04"	11th

Decathlon

Event	Cedric Nolf			Jeremy Solot		
Event	Result	Points	Rank	Result	Points	Rank
100 m	11"09 PB	841	2nd	11"28	799	8th
Long jump	7m55 PB	947	1st	7m18 PB	857	5th
Shot put	13m70 PB	710	6th	14m34 PB	749	4th
High jump	1m95 PB	758	6th	1m98 PB	785	3rd
400 m	51"30	756	13th	50"25 PB	803	8th
110 m hurdles	14"90 PB	862	8th	14"89	863	7th
Discus throw	39m76	660	11th	NM	0	17th
Pole vault	4m90 PB	880	5th	4m80 PB	849	6th
Javelin throw	66m89 PB	842	1st	55m89 PB	676	10th
1500 m	4'59"66 PB	562	13th	5'05"56	528	14th
Total		7818 PB	4th		6909	15th

Women

Athlete	Events	Heat		Final	
Athlete	Events	Result	Rank	Result	Rank
Anne Zagre	100 metres hurdles	Did not start			
Axelle Dauwens	400 metres hurdles	59"61	18th	Did not advance	
Selien De Schrijder	3,000m Steeple	10'03"48	12th q	Did not finish	
Hanne Van Hessche	High jump	1m80	12th q	1m78	13th
Aurelie De Ryck	Pole vault	3m95	15th	Did not advance	
Melissa Dupré	Javelin throw			58m25 (NR)	5th

== Badminton ==
Men

Athlete	Event	Round of 64	Round of 32	Round of 16	Quarterfinals	Semifinals	Final
Athlete	Event	Opposition Result	Opposition Result	Opposition Result	Opposition Result	Opposition Result	Opposition Result
Maxime Moreels	Men's	Merrilees (GBR); L 1-2 _{(17-21, 21-17, 14-21)}	Did not advance				

== Cycling ==
=== Road ===
Women

Athlete	Event	Time	Rank
Anne Arnouts	Road race	03:31:42 (+0:00)	Bronze medal

== Gymnastics ==
=== Artistic Gymnastics ===
Men

Athlete	Event	Points	Rank
Donna-Donny Truyens	Pommel horse	15.175	Silver medal

Athlete	Event	Apparatus						Qualification		Final	
Athlete	Event	Floor	Pommel horse	Rings	Vault	Parallel bars	Horizontal bar	Total	Rank	Total	Rank
Kristof Schroe; Jonas Toeback; Donna-Donny Truyens	Team All-around	25.850	37.700	27.450	42.850	39.500	39.000			212.350	24th

== Judo ==
Men

Athlete	Event	Round of 64	Round of 32	Round of 16	Quarterfinals	Semifinals	Final
Athlete	Event	Opposition Result	Opposition Result	Opposition Result	Opposition Result	Opposition Result	Opposition Result
Jean-Yves Bottieau	−73 kg	Bye	L Contini (BRA)	Did not advance			

== Swimming ==
Men

Athlete	Events	Heat		Final	
Athlete	Events	Time	Rank	Time	Rank
Cedric Delvoie	50 m freestyle	23"51	23rd	Did not advance	
Corentin Poels	50 m freestyle	23"22	17th	Did not advance	
Corentin Poels	100 m freestyle	51"38	27th	Did not advance	
Pierre-Yves Romanini	100 m freestyle	51"76	30th	Did not advance	
Pierre-Yves Romanini	200 m freestyle	1'53"97	25th	Did not advance	
Glenn Surgeloose	200 m freestyle	1'50"71	10th	Did not advance	
Glenn Surgeloose	100 m butterfly	54"23	15th	Did not advance	
Glenn Surgeloose; Pierre-Yves Romanini; Cedric Delvoie; Corentin Poels	4 × 100 m freestyle	3'22"04	10th	Did not advance	

Women

Athlete	Events	Heat		Final	
Athlete	Events	Time	Rank	Time	Rank
Sarah Wegria	50 m freestyle	26"63	22nd	Did not advance	
Sarah Wegria	100 m freestyle	58"16	33rd	Did not advance	
Sarah Wegria	200 m freestyle	2'06"85	35th	Did not advance	
Sarah Wegria	50 m butterfly	28"66	27th	Did not advance	

== Taekwondo ==
Men

Athlete	Event	Round of 64	Round of 32	Round of 16	Quarterfinals	Semifinals	Final
Athlete	Event	Opposition Result	Opposition Result	Opposition Result	Opposition Result	Opposition Result	Opposition Result
Melvin Willems	−63 kg	Bye	Arventii (MDA); L 2-3	Did not advance			

== Volleyball ==
Women

Squad list	Group stage		9th-16th place	9th-12th place	9th place	
Squad list	Opposition Score	Rank	Opposition Score	Opposition Score	Opposition Score	Rank
Freya Aelbrecht; Jasmien Biebauw; Valérie Courtois; Laura De Schrijver; Lies Eykens; Laura Heyrman; Charlotte Leys; Hélène Rousseaux; Sarah Smits; Ilka Van de Vyver; Lise Van Hecke; Jolien Wittock	China; L 0 - 3	3rd	France; W 3 - 0	Hong Kong; W 3 - 0	Italy; W 3 - 1	9th
Freya Aelbrecht; Jasmien Biebauw; Valérie Courtois; Laura De Schrijver; Lies Eykens; Laura Heyrman; Charlotte Leys; Hélène Rousseaux; Sarah Smits; Ilka Van de Vyver; Lise Van Hecke; Jolien Wittock	Japan; L 1 - 3	3rd	France; W 3 - 0	Hong Kong; W 3 - 0	Italy; W 3 - 1	9th
Freya Aelbrecht; Jasmien Biebauw; Valérie Courtois; Laura De Schrijver; Lies Eykens; Laura Heyrman; Charlotte Leys; Hélène Rousseaux; Sarah Smits; Ilka Van de Vyver; Lise Van Hecke; Jolien Wittock	Sweden; W 3 - 0	3rd	France; W 3 - 0	Hong Kong; W 3 - 0	Italy; W 3 - 1	9th

== Weightlifting ==
Men

Athlete	Event	Snatch		Clean & Jerk		Total	Rank
Athlete	Event	Result	Rank	Result	Rank	Total	Rank
Djihed Naga	-62 kg	105 kg	10th	110 kg	12th	215 kg	11th
