= Eglė Zablockytė =

Lithuanian cyclist (born 1989)

Personal information
- Born: 24 May 1989 (age 37) Lithuania

Cycling career
- Sport: Cycling
- Disciplines: Road cycling, Track cycling
- Role: Rider

Professional teams
- 2009: USC Chirio Forno d'Asolo
- 2013: Chirio Forno d'Asolo

Eglė Zablockytė (born 24 May 1989) is a track and road cyclist from Lithuania. She won with together with Aušrinė Trebaitė and Aleksandra Sošenko the women's team time trial at the 2011 Summer Universiade.
