= Rytis Sakalauskas =

Lithuanian sprinter (born 1987)

Medal record

Men's athletics

Representing Lithuania

Universiade
Silver medal – second place	2011 Shenzhen	100 m

European Team Championships
Gold medal – first place	2011 Novi Sad	100 m

Rytis Sakalauskas (born 27 June 1987 in Alytus) is a track and field sprint athlete who competes internationally for Lithuania.

In 2010 he broke the world record in the seldom run indoor 150 m running event.

On 30 May 2010 at the Lausitzer Meeting Sakalauskas broke the 100 metres national record. After a few months, a new Lithuanian 100 metres record was set by Martynas Jurgilas. At the IAAF Diamond League Sakalauskas again broke the national record – 10.24. He broke the record again at the 2011 Lithuanian Championships with a time of 10.18.

At the 2012 European Championships held in Helsinki, Finland, Sakalauskas qualified for the final. The first start of the final was called back because Sakalauskas did not move upon start at all, which confused the starter. The second start was called back because Italy's Simone Collio moved too early and had to be disqualified. Again, at the third start Sakalauskas left himself behind the others and walked back to the start line without any intention of finishing the race. Before race Sakalauskas has announced that he wouldn't start at the final because of an injury he sustained after the semifinals.

Sakalauskas reached the semifinal of the 2014 and 2016 European Championship.

== Personal bests ==
Event	Time (sec)	Venue	Date
60 metres	6.64	Volgograd, Russia	21 January 2012
100 metres	10.14	Shenzhen, China	17 August 2011
150 metres	15.53	Korsholm, Finland	11 February 2010
200 metres	20.74	Brussels, Belgium	16 September 2011

== Achievements ==
Year	Competition	Venue	Position	Event	Notes
Representing Lithuania
2006	Lithuanian Championships	Kaunas, Lithuania	1st	100 m	10.80
2007	European U23 Championships	Debrecen, Hungary	11th (h)	4 × 100 m relay	40.51
2009	European U23 Championships	Kaunas, Lithuania	4th	100 m	10.38 (wind: 1.5 m/s)
2009	Universiade	Belgrade, Serbia	5th	100 m	10.41
2009	Universiade	Belgrade, Serbia	5th	4 × 100 m relay	39.81
2009	Lithuanian Championships	Kaunas, Lithuania	1st	100 m	10.48
2010	Botnia Games	Korsholm, Finland	1st	150 m indoor	WR
2010	Memorial Van Damme European Union Cup	Brussels, Belgium	2nd	100 m	10.24 (wind: +0.6 m/s)
2011	European Indoor Championships	Paris, France	15th (sf)	60 m	6.71
2011	Universiade	Shenzhen, China	2nd	100 m	10.14 NR
2012	World Indoor Championships	Istanbul, Turkey	9th (sf)	60 m	6.69
2012	European Championships	Helsinki, Finland	—	100 m	DNF
