= Cycling at the 2011 Summer Universiade =

Cycling was contested at the 2011 Summer Universiade from August 13 to August 20 at the Cycling Courses of Longgang Sports Center in Shenzhen, China. Men's and women's individual and team events were held.

== Events ==
Medals will be awarded in four disciplines: track cycling, road cycling, mountain bike, and BMX. The following events were contested:

=== Track cycling ===
- Keirin – men
- Individual pursuit – 4 km men, 3 km women
- Sprint – men, women
- Points race – 30 km men, 20 km women

=== Road cycling ===
- Road bicycle race – 160 km men, 120 km women
- Road team time trial – 50 km men, 30 km women

=== Mountain bike ===
- Mountain bike race – men, women

=== BMX ===
- BMX race – men, women

== Medal summary ==
=== Medal table ===
Rank	Nation	Gold	Silver	Bronze	Total
1	Russia (RUS)	7	7	2	16
2	China (CHN)	3	0	1	4
2	Lithuania (LTU)	3	0	1	4
4	Switzerland (SUI)	1	3	1	5
5	South Korea (KOR)	1	2	3	6
6	Ukraine (UKR)	1	2	1	4
7	Germany (GER)	0	1	1	2
8	Estonia (EST)	0	1	0	1
9	France (FRA)	0	0	2	2
9	Japan (JPN)	0	0	2	2
11	Belgium (BEL)	0	0	1	1
11	Czech Republic (CZE)	0	0	1	1
Totals (12 entries)		16	16	16	48

=== Track cycling ===
Event	Gold		Silver		Bronze	
Men's individual pursuit	Sergei Shilov; Russia	4:30.927	Artur Ershov; Russia	4:33.128	Jang Sun-Jae; South Korea	4:26.22
Women's individual pursuit	Vilija Sereikaitė; Lithuania	3:36.944 UR	Lesya Kalytovska; Ukraine	3:40.068	Svitlana Halyuk; Ukraine	3:41.003
Men's individual sprint	Denis Dmitriev; Russia		Pavel Yakushevskiy; Russia		Zhang Miao; China	
Women's individual sprint	Guo Shuang; China		Victoria Baranova; Russia		Virginie Cueff; France	
Men's points race	Artur Ershov; Russia	47	Bernhard Oberholzer; Switzerland	36	Choi Seungwoo; South Korea	26
Women's points race	Lesya Kalytovska; Ukraine	40	Anastasia Chulkova; Russia	37	Minami Uwano; Japan	32
Men's Keirin	Zhang Miao; China		Pavel Yakushevskiy; Russia		Florian Vernay; France	
Women's 500 m time trial	Gong Jinjie; China	34.910 UR	Lyubov Shulika; Ukraine	34.985	Victoria Baranova; Russia	34.996

=== Road cycling ===
Event	Gold		Silver		Bronze	
Men's road race	Bernhard Oberholzer; Switzerland	3:50:22	Patrick Schelling; Switzerland	3:50:22	Genki Yamamoto; Japan	3:50:46
Women's road race	Gu Sun-Geun; South Korea	3:31:42	Son Hee-Jung; South Korea	3:31:42	Anne Arnouts; Belgium	3:31:42
Men's team time trial	Russia (RUS); Sergey Shilov; Valery Kaykov; Artur Ershov; Maksim Kozyrev	55:10.92	Germany (GER); Christoph Pfingsten; Grischa Janorschke; Mathias Belka; Daniel Westmattelmann	57:55.77	South Korea (KOR); Jang Chan-Jae; Jang Sun-Jae; Park Sung-Baek; Im Jaeyeon	58:34.19
Women's team time trial	Lithuania (LTU); Eglė Zablockytė; Aušrinė Trebaitė; Aleksandra Sošenko	39:40.79	South Korea (KOR); Son Hee-Jung; Yu Seonha; Lee Aejung	40:26.37	Germany (GER); Lina Kristin Schink; Romy Kasper; Jana Schemmer	41:04.07

=== Mountain biking ===
Event	Gold	Silver	Bronze
Men's cross-country	Pavel Pryadein; Russia	Silvio Buesser; Switzerland	Jiří Hudeček; Czech Republic
Women's cross-country	Ksenia Kirillova; Russia	Maaris Meier; Estonia	Melanie Gay; Switzerland

=== BMX ===
Event	Gold	Silver	Bronze
Men	Evgeni Kleshchenko; Russia	Kirill Yashkin; Russia	Tautvydas Biknius; Lithuania
Women	Vilma Rimšaitė; Lithuania	Marina Beskhmelnova; Russia	Margarita Lomakova; Russia
