= Switzerland at the 2011 Summer Universiade =

- IOC code: SUI

in Shenzhen
- Competitors: 93 in ? sports
- Medals: Gold 1 Silver 1 Bronze 1 Total 3

Summer Universiade appearances
- 1959; 1961; 1963; 1965; 1967; 1970; 1973; 1975; 1977; 1979; 1981; 1983; 1985; 1987; 1989; 1991; 1993; 1995; 1997; 1999; 2001; 2003; 2005; 2007; 2009; 2011; 2013; 2015; 2017; 2019; 2021; 2025; 2027

Switzerland competed at the 2011 Summer Universiade in Shenzhen, China.

== Medalists ==
Medal	Name	Sport	Event
Gold	Bernhard Oberholzer	Cycling	Men's road race
Silver	Patrick Schelling	Cycling	Men's road race

== Volleyball ==
Switzerland has qualified a men's team.
