= Estonia at the 2011 Summer Universiade =

- IOC code: EST
- National federation: Eesti Akadeemiline Spordiliit

in Shenzhen 12 August 2011 – 23 August 2011
- Competitors: 79 in 14 sports
- Medals Ranked 38th: Gold 1 Silver 1 Bronze 1 Total 3

Summer Universiade appearances (overview)
- 1993; 1995; 1997; 1999; 2001; 2003; 2005; 2007; 2009; 2011; 2013; 2015; 2017; 2019; 2021; 2025; 2027

Estonia competed at the 2011 Summer Universiade in Shenzhen, China.

== Medalists ==
Medal	Name	Sport	Event
Gold	Märt Israel	Athletics	Men's discus throw
Silver	Maaris Meier	Cycling	Women's cross-country
Bronze	Anna Iljuštšenko	Athletics	Women's high jump

== Cycling ==
Road

Men

- Mihkel Ronimois
- Rauno Miilmann

== Football ==
Women

- Signy Aarna
- Kristel Eier
- Liis Emajõe
- Hannaliis Jaadla
- Imbi Hoop
- Miina Kallas
- Karina Kesvatera
- Getter Laar
- Daniela Mona Lambin
- Katrin Loo
- Maarija Mikiver
- Kethy Õunpuu
- Annika Pajupuu
- Cathy Pärnamets
- Pille Raadik
- Liisi Sakala
- Eneli Vals
- Margarita Zernosekova
- Inna Zlidnis
