= Martynas Jurgilas =

Lithuanian sprinter (born 1988)

Personal information
- Born: 5 September 1988 (age 37) Šilalė, Lithuania
Medal record
Men's athletics
Representing Lithuania
European Team Championships
Bronze medal – third place	2011 Novi Sad	200 m

Martynas Jurgilas (born 5 September 1988) was a track and field sprint athlete who competed internationally for Lithuania.

On 12 June 2010 in Liberty, Missouri, United States, Jurgilas set a new 100 metres national record of 10.27 seconds. This record has since been broken by Rytis Sakalauskas (10.14 s).

On 7 May 2011 in Manhattan, Kansas, United States, Jurgilas set a new 200 metres national record of 20.84 seconds, which was also soon broken by Rytis Sakalauskas (20.74 s).
