= Facundo Imhoff =

Argentine volleyball player (born 1989)

Personal information
- Nationality: Argentine
- Born: 25 January 1989 (age 37); Franck, Argentina
- Height: 202 cm (6 ft 8 in)
- Weight: 86 kg (190 lb)
- Spike: 336 cm (132 in)
- Block: 324 cm (128 in)

Volleyball information
- Number: 13 (national team)

Career
Years	Teams
2014	Lomas Volley

National team
2014	Argentina
Honours
Men's volleyball
Representing Argentina
Pan American Games
Gold medal – first place	2019 Lima	Team
Summer Universiade
Bronze medal – third place	2015 Gwangju	Team

Facundo Imhoff (born 25 January 1989) is an Argentine male volleyball player. He was part of the Argentina men's national volleyball team. On club level since 2021 he has played at Volley Amriswil.

In August 2019, he publicly came out as gay.
