= Aleksandra Sošenko =

Lithuanian cyclist (born 1991)

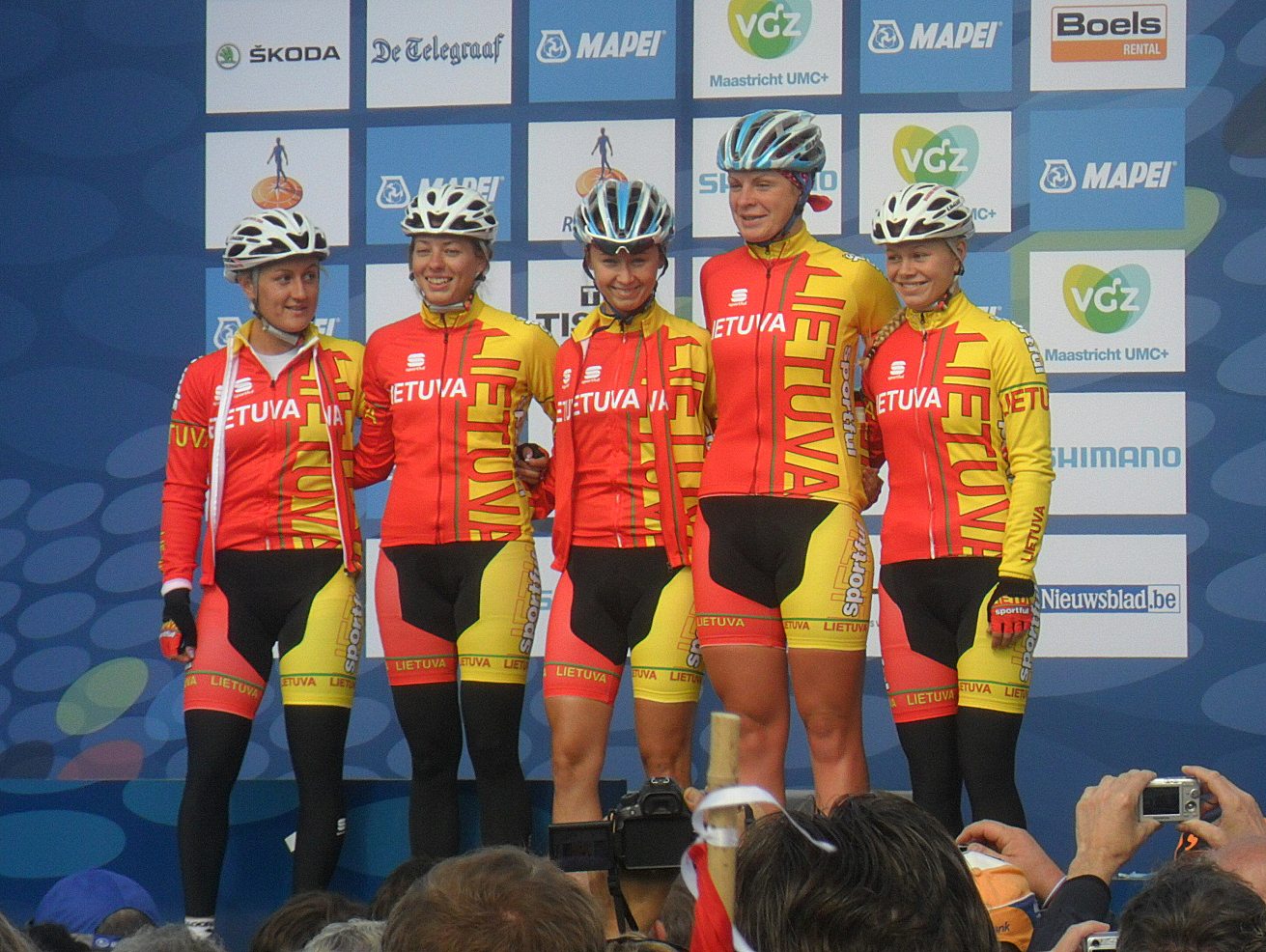
- Aleksandra Sošenko at the 2012 UCI Road World Championships

Personal information
- Full name: Aleksandra Sošenko
- Born: 15 January 1991 (age 35) Vilnius, Lithuania

Cycling career
- Sport: Cycling
- Discipline: Road

Professional team
- 2010: USC Chirio Forno d'Asolo

Aleksandra Sošenko (born 15 January 1991) is a Lithuanian racing cyclist.

== Major achievements ==
=== Road cycling ===
2010
3rd, Lithuanian National Time Trial Championships
2011
3rd, Puchar Prezesa LZS
3rd, Lithuanian National Time Trial Championships
Gold, Universiade, Women team time trial

=== Track cycling ===
2009
Bronze, World Championships, Junior Women's Scratch
