= Tennis at the 2011 Summer Universiade – Mixed doubles =

Mixed doubles
- Tennis at the 2011 Summer Universiade

Final
- Champions: Chan Chin-wei; (Chinese Taipei) Lee Hsin-han (TPE)
- Runners-up: Aliaksander Bury; (Belarus) Sviatlana Pirazhenka (BLR)
- Score: 6–2, 6–3

Events
Singles	men	women
Doubles	men	women	mixed
Team	men	women
← 2009 ·	Summer Universiade	· 2013 →

The mixed doubles tennis event at the 2011 Summer Universiade will be held from August 16 to August 21 at the Longgang Tennis Center and the Shenzhen Tennis Center in Shenzhen, China.

== Seeds ==
The first five seeds receive a bye into the second round

1. Chan Chin-wei / (Chinese Taipei) Lee Hsin-han (TPE) (champions)
2. Varatchaya Wongteanchai / (Thailand) Weerapat Doakmaiklee (THA) (semifinals)
3. Aliaksandr Bury / (Belarus) Sviatlana Pirazhenka (BLR) (final)
4. Takuto Niki / (Japan) Shuko Aoyama (JPN) (semifinals)
5. Roman Jebavý / (Czech Republic) Jana Jandova (CZE) (quarterfinals)
6. Xu Junchao / (China) Li Ting (CHN) (quarterfinals)
7. Stanislav Poplavskyy / (Ukraine) Anastasiya Vasylyeva (UKR) (quarterfinals)
8. Katarina Kachliková / (Slovakia) Michal Pazicky (SVK) (second round)

== Draw ==
=== Key ===
- Q = Qualifier
- WC = Wild card
- LL = Lucky loser
- Alt = Alternate
- ITF = ITF entry
- PR = Protected ranking
- SR = Special ranking
- SE = Special exempt
- JE = Junior exempt
- JR = Junior Accelerator Programme entrant
- CO = College Accelerator Programme entrant
- NG = Next Gen Accelerator Program entrant
- w/o = Walkover
- r = Retired
- d = Defaulted

=== Finals ===
Semifinals
1	Lee Hsin-han (Chinese Taipei) Chan Chin-wei (TPE)	4	7^{7}	6
4	Takuto Niki (Japan) Shuko Aoyama (JPN)	6	6^{3}	1
3	Aliaksandr Bury (Belarus) Sviatlana Pirazhenka (BLR)	7^{7}	2	6
2	Weerapat Doakmaiklee (Thailand) Varatchaya Wongteanchai (THA)	6^{0}	6	4

Final
1	Lee Hsin-han (Chinese Taipei) Chan Chin-wei (TPE)	6	6
3	Aliaksandr Bury (Belarus) Sviatlana Pirazhenka (BLR)	3	2

=== Top half ===
First round
P Bhambri (India) S Beniwal (IND)	3	1
S Kang (South Korea) M Song (KOR)	6	6
S Thompson (Australia) A Bai (AUS)	3	6	6
I Jagau (Namibia) J Erasmus (NAM)	6	1	1
A Veselinović (Montenegro) L Čelebić (MNE)	4	3
8	M Pazicky (Slovakia) K Kachliková (SVK)	6	6
M Anudari (Mongolia) M Margadmun (MGL)	1	1
C Koderisch (Germany) C Klaschka (GER)	6	6
KC Sher (South Africa) PW Holtzhausen (RSA)	3	3
M Sicora (United States) C Collins (USA)	6	6
F Chiaparini (Brazil) E Gomes (BRA)	3	3
7	S Poplavskyy (Ukraine) A Vasylyeva (UKR)	6	6

Second round
1	H-h Lee (Chinese Taipei) C-w Chan (TPE)	6	6
M Song (South Korea) S Kang (KOR)	2	2
S Thompson (Australia) A Bai (AUS)	4	7^{7}	6
8	M Pazicky (Slovakia) K Kachliková (SVK)	6	6^{1}	2
4	T Niki (Japan) S Aoyama (JPN)	6	6
C Koderisch (Germany) C Klaschka (GER)	2	2
M Sicora (United States) C Collins (USA)	3	0
7	S Poplavskyy (Ukraine) A Vasylyeva (UKR)	6	6

Quarterfinals
1	H-h Lee (Chinese Taipei) C-w Chan (TPE)	6	6
S Thompson (Australia) A Bai (AUS)	3	2
4	T Niki (Japan) S Aoyama (JPN)	6	6
7	S Poplavskyy (Ukraine) A Vasylyeva (UKR)	0	3

Semifinals
1	H-h Lee (Chinese Taipei) C-w Chan (TPE)	4	7^{7}	6
4	T Niki (Japan) S Aoyama (JPN)	6	6^{3}	1

=== Bottom half ===
First round
6	J Xu (China) T Li (CHN)	4	6	6
J Rompies (Indonesia) SW Trijati (INA)	6	4	1
S Jabra (Lebanon) R Alayli (LIB)	0	2
P Chekhov (Russia) M Sirotkina (RUS)	6	6
DMA Cochrane (United Kingdom) S Cornish (GBR)	6	6
L Jimenez (Spain) PM Montoro Gimenez (ESP)	1	3
D Descloix (France) M Garcia (FRA)	6	6
H Nanyingi (Uganda) C Wanyama (UGA)	0	0
L Flores (Mexico) V Pulido (MEX)	7	6
NM Rasolomalala (Madagascar) AN Rasolomalala (MAD)	5	4

Second round
6	J Xu (China) T Li (CHN)	6	7^{9}
P Chekhov (Russia) M Sirotkina (RUS)	1	6^{7}
DMA Cochrane (United Kingdom) S Cornish (GBR)	2	6	2
3	A Bury (Belarus) S Pirazhenka (BLR)	6	4	6
5	R Jebavý (Czech Republic) J Jandova (CZE)	6	7^{7}
D Descloix (France) M Garcia (FRA)	3	6^{5}
L Flores (Mexico) V Pulido (MEX)	5	1
2	W Doakmaiklee (Thailand) V Wongteanchai (THA)	7	6

Quarterfinals
6	J Xu (China) T Li (CHN)	4	4
3	A Bury (Belarus) S Pirazhenka (BLR)	6	6
5	R Jebavý (Czech Republic) J Jandova (CZE)	4	4
2	W Doakmaiklee (Thailand) V Wongteanchai (THA)	6	6

Semifinals
3	A Bury (Belarus) S Pirazhenka (BLR)	7^{7}	2	6
2	W Doakmaiklee (Thailand) V Wongteanchai (THA)	6^{0}	6	4
