= Tennis at the 2011 Summer Universiade – Men's singles =

Men's singles
- Tennis at the 2011 Summer Universiade

Final
- Champion: Lim Yong-Kyu (KOR)
- Runner-up: Teymuraz Gabashvili (RUS)
- Score: 6–3, 6–3

Events
Singles	men	women
Doubles	men	women	mixed
Team	men	women
← 2009 ·	Summer Universiade	· 2013 →

The men's singles tennis event at the 2011 Summer Universiade was held from August 14–21 at the Longgang Tennis Center and the Shenzhen Tennis Center in Shenzhen, China.

== Seeds ==
The first four seeds receive a bye into the second round.

1. Teymuraz Gabashvili (RUS) (final)
2. Lim Yong-Kyu (KOR) (champion)
3. Siarhei Betau (BLR) (semifinals)
4. David Estruch (ESP) (quarterfinals)
5. Alexander Bury (BLR) (semifinals)
6. Roman Jebavý (CZE) (quarterfinals)
7. Kittipong Wachiramanowong (THA) (quarterfinals)
8. Takuto Niki (JPN) (third round)
9. Jiří Školoudík (CZE) (third round)
10. Michal Pažický (SVK) (second round)
11. Stanislav Poplavskyy (UKR) (first round)
12. Huang Liang-chi (TPE) (quarterfinals)
13. Élie Rousset (FRA) (third round)
14. Xu Junchao (CHN) (third round, retired)
15. Anas Fattar (MAR) (third round)
16. Bruno Rodriguez (MEX) (third round)

== Draw ==
=== Key ===
- Q = Qualifier
- WC = Wild card
- LL = Lucky loser
- Alt = Alternate
- ITF = ITF entry
- PR = Protected ranking
- SR = Special ranking
- SE = Special exempt
- JE = Junior exempt
- JR = Junior Accelerator Programme entrant
- CO = College Accelerator Programme entrant
- NG = Next Gen Accelerator Program entrant
- w/o = Walkover
- r = Retired
- d = Defaulted

=== Finals ===
Quarterfinals
1	Teymuraz Gabashvili (RUS)	6	6
12	Huang Liang-chi (TPE)	2	4
3	Siarhei Betau (BLR)	2	6	7
6	Roman Jebavý (CZE)	6	2	5
5	Alexander Bury (BLR)	6	6
4	David Estruch (ESP)	3	4
7	Kittiphong Wachiramanowong (THA)	6^{2}	0
2	Lim Yong-Kyu (KOR)	7^{7}	6

Semifinals
1	Teymuraz Gabashvili (RUS)	7^{7}	7^{11}
3	Siarhei Betau (BLR)	6^{3}	6^{9}
5	Alexander Bury (BLR)	4	7^{7}	4
2	Lim Yong-Kyu (KOR)	6	6^{3}	6

Final (gold-medal match)
1	Teymuraz Gabashvili (RUS)	3	3
2	Lim Yong-Kyu (KOR)	6	6

=== Top half ===
==== Section 1 ====
First round
S Senyonga (UGA)	0	0
A Rakotondramanga (MAD)	6	6
R Rewayi (ZIM)	6	4	6
S Voskanyan (ARM)	1	6	1
AH Sasongko (INA)	7^{7}	6
11	S Poplavskyy (UKR)	6^{4}	2
12	L-c Huang (TPE)	6	6
M Sicora (USA)	1	3
M Eido (LIB)	3	0	r
B Oyunbat (MGL)	6	4
PM Montoro Gimenez (ESP)	6	6
S Thompson (AUS)	3	1
I Laszlo (HUN)	2	2
8	T Niki (JPN)	6	6

Second round
1	T Gabashvili (RUS)	6	6
A Rakotondramanga (MAD)	2	3
R Rewayi (ZIM)	1	0
AH Sasongko (INA)	6	6
12	L-c Huang (TPE)	6	1
B Oyunbat (MGL)	0	0	d
PM Montoro Gimenez (ESP)	7	1	2
8	T Niki (JPN)	5	6	6

Third round
1	T Gabashvili (RUS)	6	6
AH Sasongko (INA)	0	0
12	L-c Huang (TPE)	6	6
8	T Niki (JPN)	4	1

Quarterfinals
1	T Gabashvili (RUS)	6	6
12	L-c Huang (TPE)	2	4

==== Section 2 ====
First round
P Zerbini (BRA)	7^{7}	6
KT Brassington (GBR)	6^{2}	3
M Quinqueneau (FRA)	6	6
J de Wit (NAM)	1	0
DJ Munro (RSA)	3	1
10	M Pažický (SVK)	6	6
15	A Fattar (MAR)	6	2	7
P Anderson (CAN)	2	6	5
S Chen (CHN)	6	6
A Jain (IND)	0	1
AA Arteaga (MEX)	6	6
K Thangarajah (SRI)	1	1
D-s Oh (KOR)	0	1
6	R Jebavý (CZE)	6	6

Second round
3	S Betau (BLR)	6	6
P Zerbini (BRA)	3	2
M Quinqueneau (FRA)	6	6
10	M Pažický (SVK)	3	1
15	A Fattar (MAR)	6^{5}	6	6
S Chen (CHN)	7^{7}	4	4
AA Arteaga (MEX)	3	2
6	R Jebavý (CZE)	6	6

Third round
3	S Betau (BLR)	6	6
M Quinqueneau (FRA)	4	4
15	A Fattar (MAR)	2	2
6	R Jebavý (CZE)	6	6

Quarterfinals
3	S Betau (BLR)	2	6	7
6	R Jebavý (CZE)	6	2	5

=== Bottom half ===
==== Section 3 ====
First round
5	A Bury (BLR)	4	6	8
OI Borsos (HUN)	6	4	6
J Erasmus (NAM)	6^{2}	2
L Sood (IND)	7^{7}	6
E Corrie (GBR)	6	6
B Ndimande (ZIM)	0	0
D Erdenebayar (MGL)	2	0
16	B Rodriguez (MEX)	6	6
14	JC Xu (CHN)	6	6
R Alayi (LIB)	0	0
O Erramy (MAR)	6	0	9
C-p Hsieh (TPE)	3	6	7
W Steenkamp (RSA)	3	0
AN Rasolomalala (MAD)	6	6

Second round
5	A Bury (BLR)	6	6
L Sood (IND)	4	2
E Corrie (GBR)	6	1	0^{r}
16	B Rodriguez (MEX)	3	6	1
14	JC Xu (CHN)	6	6
O Erramy (MAR)	4	4
AN Rasolomalala (MAD)	0	0
4	D Estruch (ESP)	6	6

Third round
5	A Bury (BLR)	7	6
16	B Rodriguez (MEX)	5	3
14	JC Xu (CHN)	6	6^{5}	0^{r}
4	D Estruch (ESP)	4	7^{7}	0

Quarterfinals
5	A Bury (BLR)	6	6
4	D Estruch (ESP)	3	4

==== Section 4 ====
First round
7	K Wachiramanowong (THA)	6	6
C Wanyama (UGA)	0	0
D Haputhanthri (SRI)	1	0
J Ito (JPN)	6	6
CPW Ho (CAN)	3	3
P Arndt (USA)	6	6
I Anikanov (UKR)	2	2
9	J Školoudík (CZE)	6	6
13	É Rousset (FRA)	3	6	6
I Kosec (SVK)	6	4	3
A Manegin (RUS)	2	0
L Čelebić (MNE)	6	6
E Gomes (BRA)	6	6
C Koderisch (GER)	1	2

Second round
7	K Wachiramanowong (THA)	2	7^{10}	6
J Ito (JPN)	6	6^{8}	4
P Arndt (USA)	4	7	3
9	J Školoudík (CZE)	6	5	6
13	É Rousset (FRA)	7^{7}	6
L Čelebić (MNE)	6^{4}	2
E Gomes (BRA)	7^{7}	3	7
2	Y-K Lim (KOR)	6^{4}	6	6

Third round
7	K Wachiramanowong (THA)	6	7
9	J Školoudík (CZE)	2	5
13	É Rousset (FRA)	4	6^{4}
2	Y-K Lim (KOR)	6	7^{7}

Quarterfinals
7	K Wachiramanowong (THA)	6^{2}	0
2	Y-K Lim (KOR)	7^{7}	6

== Consolation draw ==
=== Consolation finals ===
Semifinals
Sho Katayama (JPN)	6	6
Kyle Thomas Brassington (GBR)	1	1
Takeshi Endo (JPN)	1	6	[10]
Carl Po Wang Ho (CAN)	6	3	[5]

Final
Sho Katayama (JPN)	6	6
Takeshi Endo (JPN)	2	3

=== Consolation main draw ===
==== Top half ====
First round
W Steenkamp (RSA)	2	7	[10]
G Mann (IND)	6	5	[7]
J de Wit (NAM)	w/o
M Eido (LIB)
D Haputhanthri (SRI)	0	2
L Imre (HUN)	6	6
DJ Munro (RSA)	6	6
V Jaysiri (SRI)	0	0
S Beniwal (IND)	6	6
S Thompson (AUS)	4	4

Second round
S Katayama (JPN)	6	6
W Steenkamp (RSA)	1	1
J de Wit (NAM)	7	0	[6]
L Imre (HUN)	5	6	[10]
P Miklušičák (SVK)	1	6	[10]
DJ Munro (RSA)	6	4	[8]
S Beniwal (IND)	0	6^{4}
KT Brassington (GBR)	6	7^{7}

Quarterfinals
S Katayama (JPN)	6	6
L Imre (HUN)	1	3
P Miklušičák (SVK)	6^{3}	1
KT Brassington (GBR)	7^{7}	6

Semifinals
S Katayama (JPN)	6	6
KT Brassington (GBR)	1	1

==== Bottom half ====
First round
V Rakotondramanga (MAD)	4	3
PW Holtzhausen (RSA)	6	6
K Sayalolibavan (SRI)	0	1
J Erasmus (NAM)	6	6
CPW Ho (CAN)	6	6
K Thangarajah (SRI)	0	0
G Husselmann (NAM)	6	6
S Senyonga (UGA)	4	4
A Jain (IND)	0	2
M Sicora (USA)	6	6

Second round
T Endo (JPN)	6	6
PW Holtzhausen (RSA)	0	0
J Erasmus (NAM)
D Descloix (FRA)	^{w/o}
CPW Ho (CAN)	6	6
G Husselmann (NAM)	0	0
M Sicora (USA)	3	2
I Anikanov (UKR)	6	6

Quarterfinals
T Endo (JPN)	6	3	[11]
D Descloix (FRA)	4	6	[9]
CPW Ho (CAN)	6	6
I Anikanov (UKR)	4	4

Semifinals
T Endo (JPN)	1	6	[10]
CPW Ho (CAN)	6	3	[5]
