= Tennis at the 2011 Summer Universiade – Men's doubles =

Men's doubles
- Tennis at the 2011 Summer Universiade

Final
- Champions: Hsieh Chengpeng; (Chinese Taipei) Lee Hsin-han (TPE)
- Runners-up: Aliaksander Bury; (Belarus) Siarhei Betau (BLR)
- Score: 6–3, 3–6, 7–5

Events
Singles	men	women
Doubles	men	women	mixed
Team	men	women
← 2009 ·	Summer Universiade	· 2013 →

The men's doubles tennis event at the 2011 Summer Universiade was held from August 14–20 at the Longgang Tennis Center and the Shenzhen Tennis Center in Shenzhen, China.

== Seeds ==
The first three seeds receive a bye into the second round.

1. Hsieh Chengpeng / Lee Hsin-han (TPE) (champions)
2. Kittiphong Wachiramanowong / Weerapat Doakmaiklee (THA) (second round)
3. Alexander Bury / Siarhei Betau (BLR) (final)
4. Teymuraz Gabashvili / Anton Manegin (RUS) (second round)
5. Roman Jebavý / Jiří Školoudík (CZE) (quarterfinals)
6. Ivan Anikanov / Stanislav Poplavskyy (UKR) (second round)
7. Lim Yong-Kyu / Seol Jae-min (KOR) (semifinals)
8. Daniel Cochrane / Edward Corrie (GBR) (quarterfinals)

== Draw ==
=== Key ===
- Q = Qualifier
- WC = Wild card
- LL = Lucky loser
- Alt = Alternate
- ITF = ITF entry
- PR = Protected ranking
- SR = Special ranking
- SE = Special exempt
- JE = Junior exempt
- JR = Junior Accelerator Programme entrant
- CO = College Accelerator Programme entrant
- NG = Next Gen Accelerator Program entrant
- w/o = Walkover
- r = Retired
- d = Defaulted

=== Finals ===
Semifinals
1	Hsieh Chengpeng (Chinese Taipei) Lee Hsin-han (TPE)	6	6^{2}	6
7	Yong-Kyu Lim (South Korea) Jae-min Seol (KOR)	3	7^{7}	3
3	Alexander Bury (Belarus) Siarhei Betau (BLR)	6	6
David Estruch (Spain) Pablo Manuel Montoro Gimenez (ESP)	2	1

Final
1	Hsieh Chengpeng (Chinese Taipei) Lee Hsin-han (TPE)	6	3	7
3	Alexander Bury (Belarus) Siarhei Betau (BLR)	3	6	5

=== Top half ===
First round
S Beniwal (India) G Mann (IND)	2	3
O Erramy (Morocco) A Fattar (MAR)	6	6
PW Holtzhausen (South Africa) W Steenkamp (RSA)	6	1	6
J Li (China) B Liu (CHN)	4	6	8
V Jaysiri (Sri Lanka) K Sayalolibavan (SRI)	0	0
5	R Jebavý (Czech Republic) J Školoudík (CZE)	6	6
4	T Gabashvili (Russia) A Manegin (RUS)	6	6
N Battushig (Mongolia) M Margadmun (MGL)	1	0
E Gomes (Brazil) P Zerbini (BRA)	6	6
R Alayli (Lebanon) M Eido (LIB)	0	0
S Senyonga (Uganda) C Wanyama (UGA)	0	3
B Ndimande (Zimbabwe) R Rewayi (ZIM)	6	6
OI Borsos (Hungary) L Imre (HUN)	2	2
7	Y-K Lim (South Korea) J-m Seol (KOR)	6	6

Second round
1	C-p Hsieh (Chinese Taipei) H-h Lee (TPE)	6	6
O Erramy (Morocco) A Fattar (MAR)	1	4
J Li (China) B Liu (CHN)	2	2
5	R Jebavý (Czech Republic) J Školoudík (CZE)	6	6
4	T Gabashvili (Russia) A Manegin (RUS)	5	6	2
E Gomes (Brazil) P Zerbini (BRA)	7	2	6
B Ndimande (Zimbabwe) R Rewayi (ZIM)	0	1
7	Y-K Lim (South Korea) J-m Seol (KOR)	6	6

Quarterfinals
1	C-p Hsieh (Chinese Taipei) H-h Lee (TPE)	7^{7}	6
5	R Jebavý (Czech Republic) J Školoudík (CZE)	6^{3}	4
E Gomes (Brazil) P Zerbini (BRA)	2	6^{2}
7	Y-K Lim (South Korea) J-m Seol (KOR)	6	7^{7}

Semifinals
1	C-p Hsieh (Chinese Taipei) H-h Lee (TPE)	6	6^{2}	6
7	Y-K Lim (South Korea) J-m Seol (KOR)	3	7^{7}	3

=== Bottom half ===
First round
8	D Cochrane (United Kingdom) E Corrie (GBR)	6	6
A Rakotondramanga (Madagascar) V Rakotondramanga (MAD)	4	3
J Ito (Japan) S Katayama (JPN)	6	2	12
L Flores (Mexico) B Rodriguez (MEX)	4	6	10
I Kosec (Slovakia) P Miklušičák (SVK)	6^{5}	1
D Descloix (France) M Quinqueneau (FRA)	7^{7}	6
6	I Anikanov (Ukraine) S Poplavskyy (UKR)	4	6	6
P Arndt (United States) G Hirshman (USA)	6	4	3
J de Wit (Namibia) G Husselmann (NAM)	2	2
D Estruch (Spain) PM Montoro Gimenez (ESP)	6	6
AH Sasongko (Indonesia) SW Trijati (INA)	1	1
P Anderson (Canada) C Lee Diagle (CAN)	6	6

Second round
8	D Cochrane (United Kingdom) E Corrie (GBR)	7	6
J Ito (Japan) S Katayama (JPN)	5	2
D Descloix (France) M Quinqueneau (FRA)	3	6	1
3	A Bury (Belarus) S Betau (BLR)	6	3	6
6	I Anikanov (Ukraine) S Poplavskyy (UKR)	3	2
D Estruch (Spain) PM Montoro Gimenez (ESP)	6	2
P Anderson (Canada) C Lee Diagle (CAN)	6	4	8
2	K Wachiramanowong (Thailand) W Doakmaiklee (THA)	3	6	6

Quarterfinals
8	D Cochrane (United Kingdom) E Corrie (GBR)	6	1	4
3	A Bury (Belarus) S Betau (BLR)	3	6	6
D Estruch (Spain) PM Montoro Gimenez (ESP)	4	7^{7}	6
P Anderson (Canada) C Lee Diagle (CAN)	6	6^{5}	4

Semifinals
3	A Bury (Belarus) S Betau (BLR)	6	6
D Estruch (Spain) PM Montoro Gimenez (ESP)	2	1
