= Tennis at the 2011 Summer Universiade – Women's singles =

Women's singles
- Tennis at the 2011 Summer Universiade

Final
- Champion: Nudnida Luangnam (THA)
- Runner-up: Nungnadda Wannasuk (THA)
- Score: 6–2, 6–4

Events
Singles	men	women
Doubles	men	women	mixed
Team	men	women
← 2009 ·	Summer Universiade	· 2013 →

The women's singles tennis event at the 2011 Summer Universiade will be held from August 14–21 at the Longgang Tennis Center and the Shenzhen Tennis Center in Shenzhen, China.

== Seeds ==
The first two seeds have a bye into the second round.

1. Sachie Ishizu (JPN) (third round)
2. Marta Sirotkina (RUS) (third round)
3. Nathalie Piquion (FRA) (third round)
4. Nudnida Luangnam (THA) (champion)
5. Ayu-Fani Damayanti (INA) (second round)
6. Hsu Wen-hsin (TPE) (second round)
7. Han Sung-hee (KOR) (second round)
8. Lavinia Tananta (INA) (third round)
9. Anastasiya Vasylyeva (UKR) (quarterfinals)
10. Nungnadda Wannasuk (THA) (final)
11. Ganna Piven (UKR) (quarterfinals)
12. Ksenia Lykina (RUS) (semifinals)
13. Yoo Mi (KOR) (semifinals)
14. Alison Bai (AUS) (second round)
15. Liu Chang (CHN) (quarterfinals)
16. Lucía Cervera Vázquez (ESP) (third round)

== Main draw ==
=== Key ===
- Q = Qualifier
- WC = Wild card
- LL = Lucky loser
- Alt = Alternate
- ITF = ITF entry
- PR = Protected ranking
- SR = Special ranking
- SE = Special exempt
- JE = Junior exempt
- JR = Junior Accelerator Programme entrant
- CO = College Accelerator Programme entrant
- NG = Next Gen Accelerator Program entrant
- w/o = Walkover
- r = Retired
- d = Defaulted

=== Finals ===
Quarterfinals
11	Ganna Piven (UKR)	2	0
12	Ksenia Lykina (RUS)	6	6
15	Liu Chang (CHN)	5	4
10	Nungnadda Wannasuk (THA)	7	6
Hiroko Kuwata (JPN)	6^{3}	3
4	Nudnida Luangnam (THA)	7^{7}	6
9	Anastasiya Vasylyeva (UKR)	4	6^{0}
13	Yoo Mi (KOR)	6	7^{7}

Semifinals
12	Ksenia Lykina (RUS)	1	6	4
10	Nungnadda Wannasuk (THA)	6	2	6
4	Nudnida Luangnam (THA)	6^{9}	6	8
13	Yoo Mi (KOR)	7^{11}	3	6

Final (gold-medal match)
10	Nungnadda Wannasuk (THA)	2	4
4	Nudnida Luangnam (THA)	6	6
Bronze-medal match

=== Top half ===
==== Section 1 ====
First round
P Goswami (IND)	1	1
T-f Juan (TPE)	6	6
S Jabra (LIB)	0	0
A Kankaras (MNE)	6	6
M Anudari (MGL)	1	0
11	G Piven (UKR)	6	6
12	K Lykina (RUS)	6	6
N Nqosa (LES)	0	0
FC Mulenga (ZAM)	0	0
C Klaschka (GER)	6	6
KC Sher (RSA)	6	4	4
D Nociarová (SVK)	2	6	6
N Fraňková (CZE)	1	6	1
7	S-h Han (KOR)	6	2	6

Second round
1	S Ishizu (JPN)	7	6
T-f Juan (TPE)	5	1
A Kankaras (MNE)	0	4
11	G Piven (UKR)	6	6
12	K Lykina (RUS)	3
C Klaschka (GER)	0^{r}
D Nociarová (SVK)	6	2	6
7	S-h Han (KOR)	4	6	3

Third round
1	S Ishizu (JPN)	4	3
11	G Piven (UKR)	6	6
12	K Lykina (RUS)	6	6
D Nociarová (SVK)	4	1

Quarterfinals
11	G Piven (UKR)	2	0
12	K Lykina (RUS)	6	6

==== Section 2 ====
First round
3	N Piquion (FRA)	6	6
N Kołat (POL)	0	2
L Marozava (BLR)	6	6
LI Palihawadne (SRI)	0	0
B Jozami (ARG)	6	6
L Tsui (HKG)	0	0
F Chiaparini (BRA)	0	1
15	C Liu (CHN)	6	6
10	N Wannasuk (THA)	5	6	6
L Jimenez (ESP)	7	0	1
A Granillo (MEX)	6	6
HF Honiball (NAM)	4	0
SR Cornish (GBR)	6	7^{6}
C Collins (USA)	7	7^{8}
H Nanyingi (UGA)	0	0
8	L Tananta (INA)	6	6

Second round
3	N Piquion (FRA)	6	6
L Marozava (BLR)	3	4
B Jozami (ARG)	3	4
15	C Liu (CHN)	6	6
10	N Wannasuk (THA)	6	6
A Granillo (MEX)	3	1
C Collins (USA)	2	6^{1}
8	L Tananta (INA)	6	7^{7}

Third round
3	N Piquion (FRA)	3	2
15	C Liu (CHN)	6	6
10	N Wannasuk (THA)	6	6
8	L Tananta (INA)	4	0

Quarterfinals
15	C Liu (CHN)	5	4
10	N Wannasuk (THA)	7	6

=== Bottom half ===
==== Section 3 ====
First round
6	W Hsu (TPE)	6	6
R Alameh (LIB)	0	0
H Kuwata (JPN)	6	6
M Dimingo (ZAM)	0	1
T Hladíková (CZE)	6	6
K Damico (USA)	4	4
FLB Malonda (COD)	0	1
14	A Bai (AUS)	6	6
16	L Cervera Vázquez (ESP)	6	4	6
CA Ricketts (GBR)	0	6	3
DDM Schelenz (GER)	6	6
G Altanzul (MGL)	1	1
W Chan (HKG)	6	6^{5}	3
A Veselinović (MNE)	3	7^{7}	6
P Sunic (CRO)	2	1
4	N Luangnam (THA)	6	6

Second round
6	W Hsu (TPE)	4	6	5
H Kuwata (JPN)	6	3	7
T Hladíková (CZE)	6	6
14	A Bai (AUS)	2	3
16	L Cervera Vázquez (ESP)	6	6
DDM Schelenz (GER)	3	1
A Veselinović (MNE)	2	1
4	N Luangnam (THA)	6	6

Third round
H Kuwata (JPN)	6	7^{8}
T Hladíková (CZE)	2	6^{6}
16	L Cervera Vázquez (ESP)	6	4	1
4	N Luangnam (THA)	3	6	6

Quarterfinals
H Kuwata (JPN)	6^{3}	3
4	N Luangnam (THA)	7^{7}	6

==== Section 4 ====
First round
5	A-F Damayanti (INA)	6	6
Z Yan (CHN)	1	1
P Bhambri (IND)	6	6
AA Olivier (RSA)	4	1
P Cooray (SRI)	0	0
LN Urbina (MEX)	6	6
S Pirazhenka (BLR)	3	3
9	A Vasylyeva (UKR)	6	6
13	M Yoo (KOR)	6	6
M Garcia (FRA)	0	3
NM Rasolomalala (MAD)	6	6
I Jagau (NAM)	0	0
K Kachliková (SVK)	6	6
O Brózda (POL)	4	2

Second round
5	A-F Damayanti (INA)	4	4
P Bhambri (IND)	6	6
LN Urbina (MEX)	4	6^{6}
9	A Vasylyeva (UKR)	6	7^{8}
13	M Yoo (KOR)	6	6
NM Rasolomalala (MAD)	1	0
K Kachliková (SVK)	2	6^{3}
2	M Sirotkina (RUS)	6	7^{7}

Third round
P Bhambri (IND)	0	2
9	A Vasylyeva (UKR)	6	6
13	M Yoo (KOR)	6	6
2	M Sirotkina (RUS)	2	1

Quarterfinals
9	A Vasylyeva (UKR)	4	6^{0}
13	M Yoo (KOR)	6	7^{7}

== Consolation draw ==
=== Consolation finals ===
Semifinals
Krista Damico (USA)	1	3
Petra Sunic (CRO)	6	6
Abigail Amy Olivier (RSA)	6	3	[1]
Imke Jagau (NAM)	2	6	[10]

Final
Petra Sunic (CRO)	6	6
Imke Jagau (NAM)	1	1

=== Consolation main draw ===
==== Top half ====
First round
LI Palihawadne (SRI)
M Dimingo (ZAM)	w/o
B von Luttichou (NAM)	0	1
P Sunic (CRO)	6	6

Second round
HF Honiball (NAM)	1	0
K Damico (USA)	6	6
M Dimingo (ZAM)	1	1
G Vatwani (IND)	6	6
N Ciolkowski (FRA)	4	5
P Sunic (CRO)	6	7
L Tsui (HKG)
KC Sher (RSA)	w/o

Quarterfinals
K Damico (USA)	6	6
G Vatwani (IND)	3	0
P Sunic (CRO)	5
KC Sher (RSA)	3	r

Semifinals
K Damico (USA)	1	3
P Sunic (CRO)	6	6

==== Bottom half ====
First round
N Nqosa (LES)	3	1
EC Olivier (RSA)	6	6

Second round
FLB Malonda (COD)	0	0
AA Olivier (RSA)	6	6
FC Mulenga (ZAM)	w/o
P Cooray (SRI)
I Jagau (NAM)	5	6	[10]
EC Olivier (RSA)	7	4	[5]
H Nanyingi (UGA)	0	0
W Chan (HKG)	6	3	r

Quarterfinals
AA Olivier (RSA)	6	6
FC Mulenga (ZAM)	0	0
I Jagau (NAM)	w/o
H Nanyingi (UGA)

Semifinals
AA Olivier (RSA)	6	3	[1]
I Jagau (NAM)	2	6	[10]
