= Tennis at the 2011 Summer Universiade – Women's doubles =

Tennis tournament in China

Women's doubles
- Tennis at the 2011 Summer Universiade

Final
- Champions: Shuko Aoyama; (Japan) Kotomi Takahata (JPN)
- Runners-up: Guo Li; (China) Li Ting (CHN)
- Score: 6–1, 3–6, 6–3

Events
Singles	men	women
Doubles	men	women	mixed
Team	men	women
← 2009 ·	Summer Universiade	· 2013 →

The women's doubles tennis event at the 2011 Summer Universiade was held from August 14–20 at the Longgang Tennis Center and the Shenzhen Tennis Center in Shenzhen, China.

== Seeds ==
1. Chan Chin-wei / Hsu Wen-hsin (TPE) (second round)
2. Ksenia Lykina / Marta Sirotkina (RUS) (semifinals)
3. Shuko Aoyama / Kotomi Takahata (JPN) (champions)
4. Jessy Rompies / Ayu-Fani Damayanti (INA) (second round)
5. Olga Brózda / Natalia Kołat (POL) (quarterfinals)
6. Varatchaya Wongteanchai / Nungnadda Wannasuk (THA) (quarterfinals)
7. Anastasiya Vasylyeva / Ganna Piven (UKR) (quarterfinals)
8. Yoo Mi / Han Sung-hee (KOR) (first round)

== Draw ==
=== Key ===
- Q = Qualifier
- WC = Wild card
- LL = Lucky loser
- Alt = Alternate
- ITF = ITF entry
- PR = Protected ranking
- SR = Special ranking
- SE = Special exempt
- JE = Junior exempt
- JR = Junior Accelerator Programme entrant
- CO = College Accelerator Programme entrant
- NG = Next Gen Accelerator Program entrant
- w/o = Walkover
- r = Retired
- d = Defaulted

=== Finals ===
Semifinals
Valeria Pulido (Mexico) Leticia Nazari Urbina (MEX)	6^{6}	3
Guo Li (China) Li Ting (CHN)	7^{8}	6
3	Shuko Aoyama (Japan) Kotomi Takahata (JPN)	6	6
2	Ksenia Lykina (Russia) Marta Sirotkina (RUS)	1	3

Final
Guo Li (China) Li Ting (CHN)	1	6	3
3	Shuko Aoyama (Japan) Kotomi Takahata (JPN)	6	3	6

=== Top half ===
First round
V Pulido (Mexico) LN Urbina (MEX)	4	6	7
C Collins (United States) K Damico (USA)	6	3	5
L Marozava (Belarus) S Pirazhenka (BLR)	6	7^{7}
A Kankaras (Montenegro) A Veselinović (MNE)	4	6^{3}
C Sher (Hong Kong) P Sher (HKG)	6	2	0^{r}
L Guo (China) T Li (CHN)	3	6	1
H Honiball (Namibia) B von Luttichou (NAM)	1	0
L Cervera Vázquez (Spain) L Jimenez (ESP)	6	6
M Dimingo (Zambia) FC Mulenga (ZAM)	0	0
6	N Wannasuk (Thailand) V Wongteanchai (THA)	6	6

Second round
1	C Chan (Chinese Taipei) W Hsu (TPE)	5	3
V Pulido (Mexico) LN Urbina (MEX)	7	6
L Marozava (Belarus) S Pirazhenka (BLR)	3	0
5	O Brózda (Poland) N Kołat (POL)	6	6
4	J Rompies (Indonesia) A-F Damayanti (INA)	4	7^{7}	2
L Guo (China) T Li (CHN)	6	6^{4}	6
L Cervera Vázquez (Spain) L Jimenez (ESP)	1	5
6	N Wannasuk (Thailand) V Wongteanchai (THA)	6	7

Quarterfinals
V Pulido (Mexico) LN Urbina (MEX)	3	6	6
5	O Brózda; N Kołat (POL)	6	4	2
L Guo (China) T Li (CHN)	6	6
6	N Wannasuk (Thailand) V Wongteanchai (THA)	3	1

Semifinals
V Pulido (Mexico) LN Urbina (MEX)	6^{6}	3
L Guo (China) T Li (CHN)	7^{8}	6

=== Bottom half ===
First round
8	S-h Han (South Korea) M Yoo (KOR)	3	5
D Nociarová (Slovakia) K Kachliková (SVK)	6	7
AA Olivier (South Africa) EC Olivier (RSA)	4	2
T Hladíková (Czech Republic) N Fraňková (CZE)	6	6
P Cooray (Sri Lanka) LI Palihawadne (SRI)	0	0
S Solanki (India) G Vatwani (IND)	6	6
7	A Vasylyeva (Ukraine) G Piven (UKR)	6	7^{8}
C Klaschka (Germany) D Schelenz (GER)	2	6^{6}
NC Marks (United Kingdom) C Ricketts (GBR)	6	6
G Altanzul (Mongolia) M Anudari (MGL)	0	1
R Alameh (Lebanon) S Jabra (LIB)	0	0
N Ciolkowski (France) N Piquion (FRA)	6	6

Second round
D Nociarová (Slovakia) K Kachliková (SVK)	3	3
T Hladíková (Czech Republic) N Fraňková (CZE)	6	6
S Solanki (India) G Vatwani (IND)	0	0
3	S Aoyama (Japan) K Takahata (JPN)	6	6
7	A Vasylyeva (Ukraine) G Piven (UKR)	1	7^{7}	6
NC Marks (United Kingdom) CA Ricketts (GBR)	6	6^{5}	2
N Ciolkowski (France) N Piquion (FRA)	3	6^{7}
2	K Lykina (Russia) M Sirotkina (RUS)	6	7^{9}

Quarterfinals
T Hladíková (Czech Republic) N Fraňková (CZE)	5	4
3	S Aoyama (Japan) K Takahata (JPN)	7	6
7	A Vasylyeva (Ukraine) G Piven (UKR)	6^{2}	1
2	K Lykina (Russia) M Sirotkina (RUS)	7^{7}	6

Semifinals
3	S Aoyama (Japan) K Takahata (JPN)	6	6
2	K Lykina (Russia) M Sirotkina (RUS)	1	3
