= Tennis at the 2011 Summer Universiade =

- Date: 14–21 August
- Edition: 15
- Location: Longgang Tennis Center, Shenzhen Tennis Center

Champions

Men's singles
- Lim Yong-Kyu (KOR)

Women's singles
- Nudnida Luangnam (THA)

Men's doubles
- Hsieh Cheng-peng / Lee Hsin-han (TPE)

Women's doubles
- Shuko Aoyama / Kotomi Takahata (JPN)

Mixed doubles
- Chan Chin-wei / Lee Hsin-han (TPE)

Men's team
- South Korea (KOR)

Women's team
- Thailand (THA)
- Summer Universiade

Tennis was contested at the 2011 Summer Universiade from August 14 to August 21 at the Longgang Tennis Center and the Shenzhen Tennis Center in Shenzhen, China. Men's and women's singles, men's and women's team, and men's, women's, and mixed doubles events were contested.

== Medal summary ==
=== Medal table ===
Rank	Nation	Gold	Silver	Bronze	Total
1	Thailand (THA)	2	1	1	4
2	South Korea (KOR)	2	0	2	4
3	Chinese Taipei (TPE)	2	0	1	3
4	Japan (JPN)	1	1	1	3
5	Belarus (BLR)	0	3	2	5
6	Russia (RUS)	0	1	3	4
7	China (CHN)	0	1	0	1
8	Mexico (MEX)	0	0	1	1
8	Spain (ESP)	0	0	1	1
Totals (9 entries)		7	7	12	26

=== Medal events ===
Event	Gold	Silver	Bronze
Men's singles	Lim Yong-Kyu; South Korea	Teymuraz Gabashvili; Russia	Siarhei Betau; Belarus
Men's singles	Lim Yong-Kyu; South Korea	Teymuraz Gabashvili; Russia	Alexander Bury; Belarus
Women's singles	Nudnida Luangnam; Thailand	Nungnadda Wannasuk; Thailand	Ksenia Lykina; Russia
Women's singles	Nudnida Luangnam; Thailand	Nungnadda Wannasuk; Thailand	Yoo Mi; South Korea
Men's doubles	Hsieh Cheng-peng; Lee Hsin-han; Chinese Taipei	Siarhei Betau; Alexander Bury; Belarus	Lim Yong-Kyu; Seol Jae-min; South Korea
Men's doubles	Hsieh Cheng-peng; Lee Hsin-han; Chinese Taipei	Siarhei Betau; Alexander Bury; Belarus	David Estruch; Pablo Manuel Montoro Gimenez; Spain
Women's doubles	Shuko Aoyama; Kotomi Takahata; Japan	Guo Li; Li Ting; China	Valeria Pulido; Leticia Nazari Urbina; Mexico
Women's doubles	Shuko Aoyama; Kotomi Takahata; Japan	Guo Li; Li Ting; China	Ksenia Lykina; Marta Sirotkina; Russia
Mixed doubles	Chan Chin-wei; Lee Hsin-han; Chinese Taipei	Alexander Bury; Sviatlana Pirazhenka; Belarus	Shuko Aoyama; Takuto Niki; Japan
Mixed doubles	Chan Chin-wei; Lee Hsin-han; Chinese Taipei	Alexander Bury; Sviatlana Pirazhenka; Belarus	Weerapat Doakmaiklee; Varatchaya Wongteanchai; Thailand
Men's team	South Korea (KOR); Lim Yong-Kyu; Oh Dae-soung; Seol Jae-min	Belarus (BLR); Siarhei Betau; Alexander Bury	Chinese Taipei (TPE); Hsieh Cheng-peng; Huang Liang-chi; Lee Hsin-han
Women's team	Thailand (THA); Nudnida Luangnam; Nungnadda Wannasuk; Varatchaya Wongteanchai	Japan (JPN); Shuko Aoyama; Sachie Ishizu; Hiroko Kuwata; Kotomi Takahata	Russia (RUS); Ksenia Lykina; Marta Sirotkina

== See also ==
- Tennis at the Summer Universiade
