= Shooting at the 2011 Summer Universiade =

Shooting at the XXVI Summer Universiade
- Venue: Shenzhen Shooting Hall
- Dates: August 18, 2011 – August 22, 2011

Shooting was contested at the 2011 Summer Universiade from August 18 to August 22 at the Shenzhen Shooting Hall and Clay-pigeon Shooting Field in Shenzhen, China. Men's and women's individual and team events was held.

== Medal summary ==
=== Medal table ===
Rank	Nation	Gold	Silver	Bronze	Total
1	China (CHN)	13	10	5	28
2	Italy (ITA)	7	0	2	9
3	South Korea (KOR)	3	4	3	10
4	Czech Republic (CZE)	2	0	1	3
5	Belarus (BLR)	2	0	0	2
5	India (IND)	2	0	0	2
7	Russia (RUS)	1	5	8	14
8	Germany (GER)	1	1	2	4
8	Thailand (THA)	1	1	2	4
10	Slovakia (SVK)	1	1	0	2
11	Ukraine (UKR)	1	0	3	4
12	France (FRA)	0	3	0	3
13	Kazakhstan (KAZ)	0	2	1	3
14	Mongolia (MGL)	0	2	0	2
14	Serbia (SRB)	0	2	0	2
16	Poland (POL)	0	1	2	3
17	Australia (AUS)	0	1	0	1
17	Austria (AUT)	0	1	0	1
19	Chinese Taipei (TPE)	0	0	1	1
19	Cyprus (CYP)	0	0	1	1
19	Hungary (HUN)	0	0	1	1
19	South Africa (RSA)	0	0	1	1
19	Sweden (SWE)	0	0	1	1
Totals (23 entries)		34	34	34	102

=== Men's events ===
==== Individual ====
Event	Gold	Silver	Bronze
10 metre air pistol	Lee Dae-myung; South Korea	Pang Wei; China	Kim Geun-Bok; South Korea
10 metre air rifle	Niccolò Campriani; Italy	Yu Jae Chul; South Korea	Gong Jiawei; China
25 metre rapid fire pistol	Ding Feng; China	Zhou Zhiguo; China	Li Yuehong; China
25 metre standard pistol	Ding Feng; China	Zhou Zhiguo; China	Dmitry Brayko; Russia
50 metre pistol	Lee Dae-myung; South Korea	Damir Mikec; Serbia	Mai Jiajie; China
50 metre rifle three positions	Niccolò Campriani; Italy	Kang Hongwei; China	Sergey Kamenskiy; Russia
50 metre rifle prone	Yury Shcherbatsevich; Belarus	Cao Yifei; China	Alexandr Yermakov; Kazakhstan
Skeet	Giancarlo Tazza; Italy	Ralf Buchheim; Germany	Gorden Gosch; Germany
Trap	Marco Panizza; Italy	Jakub Trzebinski; Poland	Simone Lorenzo Prosperi; Italy
Double trap	Alexander Furasyev; Russia	Pan Qiang; China	Hwang Sung Jin; South Korea

==== Team ====
Event	Gold	Silver	Bronze
10 metre air pistol team	South Korea (KOR)	China (CHN)	Russia (RUS)
10 metre air rifle team	Italy (ITA)	China (CHN)	Russia (RUS)
25 metre rapid fire pistol team	China (CHN)	France (FRA)	Russia (RUS)
25 metre standard pistol team	China (CHN)	Russia (RUS)	Thailand (THA)
50 metre pistol team	China (CHN)	South Korea (KOR)	Poland (POL)
50 metre rifle three positions team	China (CHN)	France (FRA)	Russia (RUS)
50 metre rifle prone team	Belarus (BLR)	Mongolia (MGL)	Sweden (SWE)
Skeet team	Czech Republic (CZE); Daniel Herberger; Petr Málek; Jakub Novota	Russia (RUS); Aleksandr Bondar; Nikolay Pilshchikov; Nikolay Teplyy	Cyprus (CYP); Andreas Chasikos; Dimitris Konstantinou; Anastasios Chapesiis
Trap team	Italy (ITA); Simone Lorenzo Prosperi; Andrea Miotto; Marco Panizza	China (CHN); Li Yang; Liu Jie; Du Yu	Poland (POL); Jakub Trzebinski; Lukasz Szum; Piotr Kowalczyk
Double trap team	China (CHN); Li Jun; Pan Qiang; Yang Yiyang	Russia (RUS); Alexander Furasyev; Artur Mingazov; Roman Zagumennov	Italy (ITA); Antonino Barillà; Alessandro Chianese; Ferdinando Rossi

=== Women's events ===
==== Individual ====
Event	Gold	Silver	Bronze
10 metre air pistol	Harveen Srao; India	Tanyaporn Prucksakorn; Thailand	Olena Kostevych; Ukraine
10 metre air rifle	Petra Zublasing; Italy	Lisa Ungerank; Austria	Manuela Christel Felix; Germany
25 metre pistol	Tanyaporn Prucksakorn; Thailand	Zorana Arunović; Serbia	Olena Kostevych; Ukraine
50 metre rifle three positions	Adéla Sýkorová; Czech Republic	Chuluunbadrakh Narantuya; Mongolia	Kata Veres; Hungary
50 metre rifle prone	Li Peijing; China	Wang Chengyi; China	Marli Vlok; South Africa
Skeet	Monika Zemkova; Slovakia	Danka Barteková; Slovakia	Yu Xiumin; China
Trap	Jana Beckmann; Germany	Catherine Skinner; Australia	Kang Gee-eun; South Korea
Double trap	Yang Xiaohui; China	Mariya Dmitriyenko; Kazakhstan	Hsu Jie-yu; Chinese Taipei

==== Team ====
Event	Gold	Silver	Bronze
10 metre air pistol team	India (IND); Harveen Srao; Juhi Talwar; Ruby Tomar	Russia (RUS); Elena Kovalevskaya; Alena Suslonova; Liubov Yaskevich	Ukraine (UKR); Yuliya Korostylova; Olena Kostevych; Inna Kryachko
10 metre air rifle team	China (CHN)	South Korea (KOR)	Russia (RUS)
25 metre pistol team	Ukraine (UKR); Kateryna Domkina; Olena Kostevych; Inna Kryachko	South Korea (KOR); Jo Soo-young; Kim Ji-hye; Lee Ho-lim	China (CHN); Lu Miaoyi; Zhang Shasha; Zhao Xu
50 metre rifle three positions team	China (CHN)	France (FRA)	Czech Republic (CZE)
50 metre rifle prone team	China (CHN)	Russia (RUS)	Thailand (THA)
Skeet team	China (CHN); Min Lu; Jing Yang; Xiumin Yu	Kazakhstan (KAZ)	Russia (RUS)
Trap team	Not awarded		
Double trap team	Not awarded		
