= Aliaksandr Bury =

Belarusian tennis player

Aliaksandr Bury Аляксандр Буры
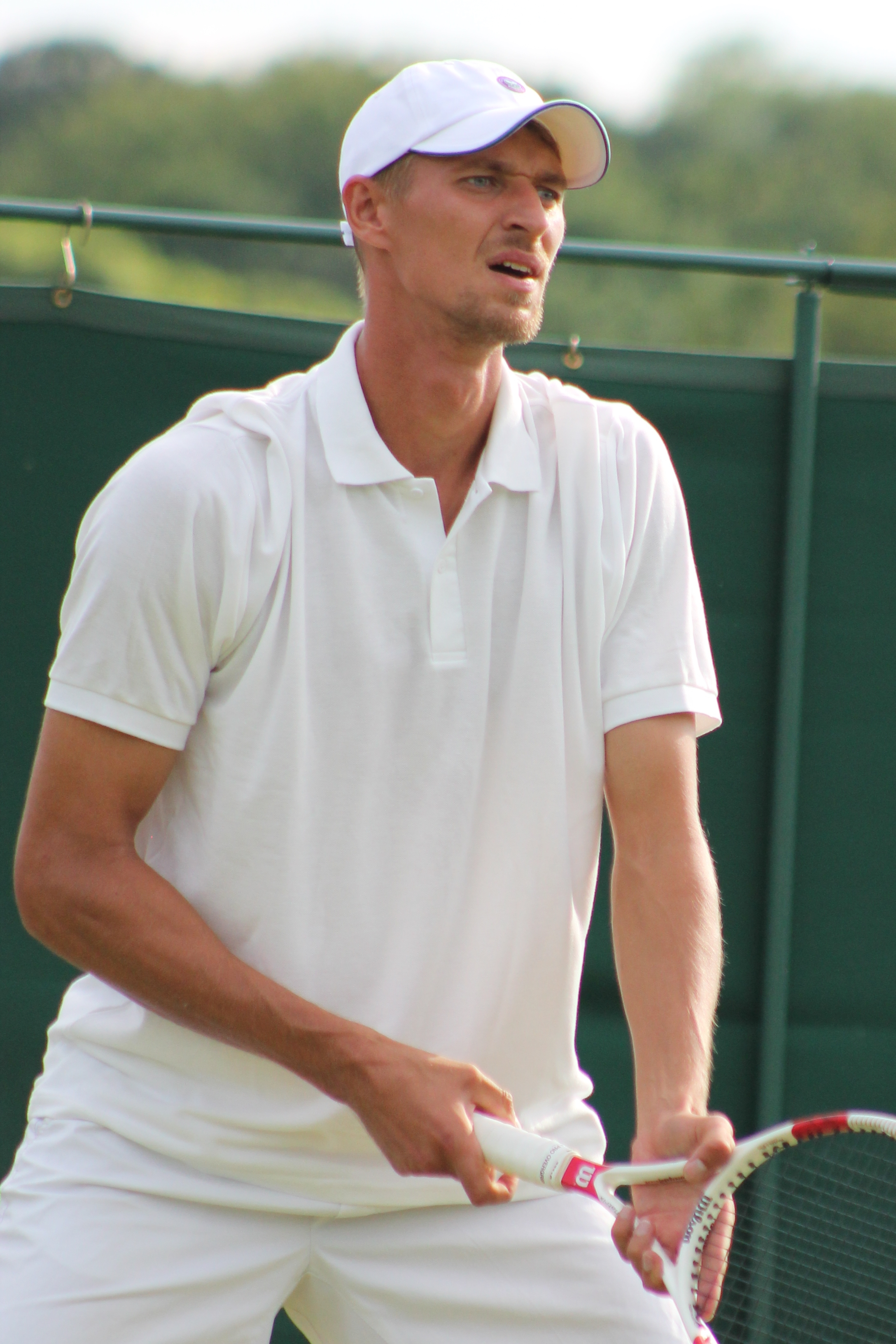
- Country (sports): Belarus
- Born: 14 September 1987 (age 38) Minsk, Belarusian SSR, Soviet Union
- Height: 2.03 m (6 ft 8 in)
- Retired: 2018 (last match)
- Plays: Right-handed (one-handed backhand)

Singles
- Career record: 2–1 (at ATP Tour level, Grand Slam level, and in Davis Cup)
- Career titles: 0
- Highest ranking: No. 366 (10 February 2014)

Doubles
- Career record: 27–39 (at ATP Tour level, Grand Slam level, and in Davis Cup)
- Career titles: 1
- Highest ranking: No. 59 (19 October 2015)

Grand Slam doubles results
- Australian Open: 1R (2016, 2017)
- French Open: 1R (2016)
- Wimbledon: 2R (2015)
- US Open: 2R (2015)

Team competitions
- Davis Cup: 8–5
Medal record
Men's tennis
Representing Belarus
Universiade
Silver medal – second place	2011 Shenzhen	Men's Doubles
Silver medal – second place	2011 Shenzhen	Mixed Doubles
Silver medal – second place	2011 Shenzhen	Men's Team
Bronze medal – third place	2011 Shenzhen	Men's Singles
Bronze medal – third place	2013 Kazan	Men's Doubles
- Last updated on: 26 August 2019.

Aliaksandr Ivanavich Bury (Belarusian: Аляксандр Іванавіч Буры; Russian: Александр Иванович Бурый; also spelt Alexander Bury), (born 14 September 1987) is a Belarusian inactive professional tennis player who competed mainly on the ATP Challenger Tour and ITF Futures, both in singles and doubles.

He has won one doubles title at ATP World Tour with Denis Istomin.

Bury reached his highest ATP singles ranking, No. 366 on 10 February 2014, and his highest ATP doubles ranking, No. 59, on 19 October 2015.

Bury has represented Belarus at Davis Cup, where he has a win–loss record of 8–5.

== ATP finals ==
=== Doubles (1-0) ===
Legend Grand Slam tournaments ATP World Tour Finals ATP World Tour Masters 1000 ATP World Tour 500 Series ATP World Tour 250 Series	Titles by surface Hard (0–0) Clay (1–0) Grass (0–0)

Result	No.	Date	Tournament	Surface	Partner	Opponents	Score
Winner	1.	2 August 2015	Swiss Open Gstaad	Clay (O)	(Uzbekistan) Denis Istomin	(Austria) Oliver Marach (Pakistan) Aisam-ul-Haq Qureshi	3–6, 6–2, [10–5]

== ITF finals (30-33) ==
=== Singles (1–1) ===
Legend Challenger Futures	Finals by surface Hard (1-1) Clay (0–0) Grass (0–0) Carpet (0–0)

Result	No.	Date	Tournament	Surface	Opponent	Score
Runner-up	1.	16 October 2010	Belarus F3 Futures	Hard (I)	(Poland) Jerzy Janowicz	6–7^{(6–8)}, 3–6
Winner	2.	20 April 2013	Uzbekistan F1 Futures	Hard (O)	(Slovakia) Marek Semjan	6–7^{(4–7)}, 6–2, 6–4

=== Doubles (29-32) ===
Legend Challenger Futures Satellites	Finals by surface Hard (16-14) Clay (11–15) Grass (0–0) Carpet (2–3)

Result	No.	Date	Tournament	Surface	Partner	Opponent	Score
Runner-up	1.	25 June 2006	Belarus F2 Futures	Hard (O)	(Belarus) Kiryl Harbatsiuk	(Russia) Alexander Krasnorutskiy (Russia) Alexander Kudryavtsev	5–7, 3–6
Runner-up	2.	29 September 2006	Egypt 2 Satellites	Clay (O)	(Belarus) Kiryl Harbatsiuk	(Egypt) Karim Maamoun (Egypt) Mohamed Mamoun	6–4, 5–7, 5-7
Runner-up	3.	8 September 2007	Bulgaria F7 Futures	Clay (O)	(Russia) Yury Shirshov	(Romania) Ilie-Aurelian Giurgiu (Romania) Octavian Nicodim	6–7^{(5–7)}, 4–6
Winner	4.	8 June 2008	Ukraine F1 Futures	Clay (O)	(Belarus) Vladimir Voltchkov	(Italy) Marco Bella (Italy) Marco Simoni	6–1, RET
Runner-up	5.	7 September 2008	Russia F6 Futures	Clay (O)	(Russia) Ervand Gasparyan	(Russia) Victor Kozin (Russia) Andrei Levine	6–4, 3–6, [8–10]
Runner-up	6.	23 October 2009	Belarus F2 Futures	Hard (I)	(Belarus) Andrei Vasilevski	(Belarus) Sergey Betov (Belarus) Nikolai Fidirko	3–6, 3–6
Runner-up	7.	13 February 2010	Israel F3 Futures	Hard (O)	(Belarus) Pavel Katliarov	(Republic of Ireland) James Cluskey (United States) Michael Venus	7–6^{(7–3)}, 3–6, [13–15]
Runner-up	8.	24 July 2010	Penza Cup, Russia	Hard (O)	(Belarus) Kiryl Harbatsiuk	(Russia) Mikhail Elgin (Austria) Nikolaus Moser	4–6, 4–6
Runner-up	9.	15 August 2010	Belarus F1 Futures	Clay (O)	(Belarus) Kiryl Harbatsiuk	(Spain) Guillermo Olaso (Czech Republic) Michal Schmid	6–2, 2–6, [8–10]
Runner-up	10.	16 October 2010	Belarus F3 Futures	Hard (I)	(Belarus) Nikolai Fidirko	(Belarus) Sergey Betov (Belarus) Dzmitry Zhyrmont	6–7^{(2–7)}, 6–3, [7–10]
Runner-up	11.	24 April 2011	Turkey F14 Futures	Hard (O)	(Ukraine) Vladyslav Klymenko	(Turkey) Tuna Altuna (Australia) Brydan Klein	4–6, 3–6
Winner	12.	15 May 2011	Czech Republic F1 Futures	Clay (O)	(Belarus) Nikolai Fidirko	(Czech Republic) Roman Jebavý (Czech Republic) Michal Konečný	6–3, 6–4
Winner	13.	5 June 2011	Poland F3 Futures	Clay (O)	(Belarus) Nikolai Fidirko	(Poland) Andriej Kapaś (Poland) Błażej Koniusz	1–6, 6–3, [10–6]
Runner-up	14.	3 July 2011	Germany F7 Futures	Clay (O)	(Belarus) Sergey Betov	(Germany) Bastian Knittel (Germany) Alexander Satschko	6–7^{(3–7)}, 3–6
Winner	15.	23 July 2011	Estonia F1 Futures	Clay (O)	(Belarus) Andrei Vasilevski	(Belarus) Pavel Filin (Belarus) Dzmitry Zhyrmont	4–6, 7–6^{(7–5)}, [10–6]
Runner-up	16.	4 September 2011	Poland F8 Futures	Clay (O)	(Belarus) Andrei Vasilevski	(Poland) Adam Chadaj (Poland) Andriej Kapaś	5–7, 4–6
Runner-up	17.	25 September 2011	ATP Challenger Trophy, Slovakia	Clay (O)	(Belarus) Andrei Vasilevski	(Australia) Colin Ebelthite (Czech Republic) Jaroslav Pospíšil	3–6, 4–6
Runner-up	18.	9 October 2011	Sicilia Classic, Italy	Clay (O)	(Belarus) Andrei Vasilevski	(Poland) Tomasz Bednarek (Poland) Mateusz Kowalczyk	2–6, 4–6
Runner-up	19.	20 November 2011	Czech Republic F4 Futures	Carpet (I)	(Belarus) Sergey Betov	(Czech Republic) Roman Jebavý (Czech Republic) Jan Šátral	4–6, 3–6
Winner	20.	27 November 2011	Czech Republic F5 Futures	Carpet (I)	(Belarus) Sergey Betov	(Czech Republic) Michal Konečný (Ukraine) Leonard Stakhovsky	7–6^{(7–4)}, 6–2
Winner	21.	20 January 2012	Russia F2 Futures	Hard (I)	(Belarus) Sergey Betov	(Latvia) Andis Juška (Latvia) Deniss Pavlovs	6–1, 6–3
Runner-up	22.	5 February 2012	Kazan Kremlin Cup, Russia	Hard (I)	(Poland) Mateusz Kowalczyk	(Thailand) Sanchai Ratiwatana (Thailand) Sonchat Ratiwatana	3–6, 1–6
Runner-up	23.	27 May 2012	Poland F1 Futures	Clay (O)	(Latvia) Deniss Pavlovs	(Poland) Tomasz Bednarek (Poland) Mateusz Kowalczyk	2–6, 7–6^{(7–5)}, [9–11]
Runner-up	24.	4 November 2012	Czech Republic F7 Futures	Carpet (I)	(Belarus) Nikolai Fidirko	(Czech Republic) Roman Jebavý (Czech Republic) Jan Šátral	7–6^{(7–5)}, 1–6, [5–10]
Runner-up	25.	11 November 2012	Czech Republic F8 Futures	Carpet (I)	(Poland) Andriej Kapaś	(Czech Republic) Otakar Lucák (Czech Republic) Pavel Šnobel	2–6, 7–6^{(7–5)}, [4–10]
Runner-up	26.	23 February 2013	Russia F1 Futures	Hard (I)	(Belarus) Nikolai Fidirko	(Latvia) Andis Juška (Russia) Konstantin Kravchuk	4–6, 6–3, [6–10]
Winner	27.	23 March 2013	Russia F3 Futures	Hard (I)	(Russia) Mikhail Fufygin	(Estonia) Vladimir Ivanov (Belarus) Andrei Vasilevski	7–6^{(7–2)}, 6–3
Runner-up	28.	27 April 2013	Uzbekistan F2 Futures	Hard (O)	(Russia) Mikhail Fufygin	(Belarus) Sergey Betov (Belarus) Dzmitry Zhyrmont	2–6, 6–7^{(3–7)}
Winner	29.	1 June 2013	Russia F8 Futures	Clay (O)	(Ukraine) Volodymyr Uzhylovskyi	(Canada) Steven Diez (Russia) Vladislav Dubinsky	6–0, 6–1
Runner-up	30.	11 August 2013	Poland F2 Futures	Clay (O)	(Belarus) Vladzimir Kruk	(Monaco) Benjamin Balleret (Poland) Piotr Gadomski	2–6, 5–7
Winner	31.	31 August 2013	Russia F12 Futures	Clay (O)	(Belarus) Sergey Betov	(Russia) Evgeny Karlovskiy (Israel) Igor Smilansky	6–1, 7–6^{(7–2)}
Winner	32.	18 October 2013	Kazakhstan F7 Futures	Hard (O)	(Belarus) Sergey Betov	(Slovakia) Marek Semjan (Kazakhstan) Denis Yevseyev	6–7^{(5–7)}, 6–3, [10–7]
Winner	33.	26 October 2013	Kazakhstan F8 Futures	Hard (O)	(Belarus) Sergey Betov	(Belarus) Vladzimir Kruk (Belarus) Yaraslav Shyla	5–7, 6–2, [10–3]
Winner	34.	24 November 2013	Siberia Cup, Russia	Hard (I)	(Belarus) Sergey Betov	(Ukraine) Ivan Anikanov (Croatia) Ante Pavić	6–4, 6–2
Winner	35.	26 January 2014	Germany F3 Futures	Carpet (I)	(Georgia (country)) Nikoloz Basilashvili	(Belarus) Uladzimir Ignatik (Bulgaria) Dimitar Kutrovsky	4–6, 6–4, [10–6]
Winner	36.	23 February 2014	Astana Challenger, Kazakhstan	Hard (I)	(Belarus) Sergey Betov	(Kazakhstan) Andrey Golubev (Kazakhstan) Evgeny Korolev	6–1, 6–4
Winner	37.	17 May 2014	Samarkand Challenger, Uzbekistan	Clay (O)	(Belarus) Sergey Betov	(Uzbekistan) Shonigmatjon Shofayziyev (Uzbekistan) Vaja Uzakov	6–4, 6–3
Winner	38.	24 May 2014	Karshi Challenger, Uzbekistan	Hard (O)	(Belarus) Sergey Betov	(China) Gong Maoxin (Chinese Taipei) Peng Hsien-yin	7–5, 1–6, [10–6]
Winner	39.	15 June 2014	Fergana Challenger, Uzbekistan	Hard (O)	(Belarus) Sergey Betov	(Colombia) Nicolás Barrientos (Russia) Stanislav Vovk	6–7^{(6–8)}, 7–6^{(7–1)}, [10–3]
Winner	40.	13 July 2014	Tilia Slovenia Open, Slovenia	Hard (O)	(Belarus) Sergey Betov	(Serbia) Ilija Bozoljac (Italy) Flavio Cipolla	6–0, 6–3
Winner	41.	16 August 2014	Belarus F1 Futures	Hard (O)	(Belarus) Sergey Betov	(France) Hugo Nys (Australia) Dane Propoggia	7–6^{(7–0)}, 7–6^{(7–5)}
Winner	42.	23 August 2014	Belarus F2 Futures	Hard (O)	(Belarus) Sergey Betov	(France) Hugo Nys (Australia) Dane Propoggia	6–3, 7–5
Winner	43.	24 October 2014	Belarus F4 Futures	Hard (I)	(Belarus) Sergey Betov	(Belarus) Artur Dubinski (Belarus) Ivan Liutarevich	7–6^{(7–4)}, 7–6^{(7–5)}
Winner	44.	9 November 2014	Sparkassen ATP Challenger, Italy	Hard (I)	(Belarus) Sergey Betov	(Republic of Ireland) James Cluskey (United States) Austin Krajicek	6–4, 5–7, [10–6]
Runner-up	45.	12 April 2015	Tennis Napoli Cup, Italy	Clay (O)	(Georgia (country)) Nikoloz Basilashvili	(Serbia) Ilija Bozoljac (Serbia) Filip Krajinović	1–6, 2–6
Runner-up	46.	9 August 2015	Open Castilla y León, Spain	Hard (O)	(Sweden) Andreas Siljeström	(Russia) Alexander Kudryavtsev (Ukraine) Denys Molchanov	2–6, 4–6
Runner-up	47.	15 August 2015	Tilia Slovenia Open, Slovenia	Hard (O)	(Sweden) Andreas Siljeström	(France) Fabrice Martin (India) Purav Raja	6–7^{(5–7)}, 6–4, [16–18]
Runner-up	48.	15 November 2015	Internationaux de Tennis de Vendée, France	Hard (I)	(Sweden) Andreas Siljeström	(Netherlands) Sander Arends (Poland) Adam Majchrowicz	3–6, 7–5, [8–10]
Winner	49.	20 March 2016	Kazan Kremlin Cup, Russia	Hard (I)	(Slovakia) Igor Zelenay	(Russia) Konstantin Kravchuk (Austria) Philipp Oswald	6–2, 4–6, [10–6]
Winner	50.	4 June 2016	UniCredit Czech Open, Czech Republic	Clay (O)	(Slovakia) Igor Zelenay	(Chile) Julio Peralta (Chile) Hans Podlipnik-Castillo	6–4, 6–4
Winner	51.	21 August 2016	Internazionali di Tennis del Friuli Venezia Giulia, Italy	Clay (O)	(Germany) Andre Begemann	(Czech Republic) Roman Jebavý (Czech Republic) Zdeněk Kolář	5–7, 6–4, [11–9]
Runner-up	52.	11 September 2016	AON Open Challenger, Italy	Clay (O)	(Belarus) Andrei Vasilevski	(Chile) Julio Peralta (Argentina) Horacio Zeballos	4–6, 3–6
Winner	53.	18 September 2016	Pekao Szczecin Open, Poland	Clay (O)	(Germany) Andre Begemann	(Sweden) Johan Brunström (Sweden) Andreas Siljeström	7–6^{(7–3)}, 6–7^{(7–9)}, [10–4]
Winner	54.	30 October 2016	WHB Hungarian Open, Hungary	Hard (I)	(Sweden) Andreas Siljeström	(United States) James Cerretani (Austria) Philipp Oswald	7–6^{(7–3)}, 6–4
Runner-up	55.	24 March 2017	International Challenger Quanzhou, China	Hard (O)	(Germany) Andre Begemann	(Chinese Taipei) Hsieh Cheng-peng (Chinese Taipei) Peng Hsien-yin	6–3, 4–6, [7–10]
Runner-up	56.	2 September 2017	Città di Como Challenger, Italy	Clay (O)	(Germany) Kevin Krawietz	(Netherlands) Sander Arends (Croatia) Antonio Šančić	6–7^{(1–7)}, 2–6
Runner-up	57.	17 September 2017	Pekao Szczecin Open, Poland	Clay (O)	(Sweden) Andreas Siljeström	(Netherlands) Wesley Koolhof (New Zealand) Artem Sitak	1–6, 5–7
Runner-up	58.	10 March 2018	Zhuhai Open, China	Hard (O)	(Chinese Taipei) Peng Hsien-yin	(Ukraine) Denys Molchanov (Slovakia) Igor Zelenay	5–7, 6–7^{(4–7)}
Winner	59.	24 March 2018	Qujing International Challenger, China	Hard (O)	(Chinese Taipei) Peng Hsien-yin	(China) Wu Di (China) Zhang Ze	6–7^{(3–7)}, 6–4, [12–10]
Winner	60.	29 April 2018	Kunming Open, China	Clay (O)	(South Africa) Lloyd Harris	(China) Gong Maoxin (China) Zhang Ze	6–3, 6–4
Runner-up	61.	29 September 2018	Kazakhstan F8 Futures	Clay (O)	(Belarus) Maksim Zubkou	(Kazakhstan) Grigoriy Lomakin (Georgia (country)) George Tsivadze	6–7^{(3–7)}, 3–6
