= Seol Jae-min =

South Korean tennis player

Seol Jae-min 설재민
- Country (sports): South Korea
- Born: 15 January 1990 (age 35) Gyeonggi Province, South Korea
- Retired: 2018 (last match played)
- Plays: Right-handed (one-handed backhand)
- Prize money: $16,399

Singles
- Career record: 0–1 (at ATP Tour level, Grand Slam level, and in Davis Cup)
- Career titles: 0
- Highest ranking: No. 950 (24 August 2015)

Doubles
- Career record: 2–3 (at ATP Tour level, Grand Slam level, and in Davis Cup)
- Career titles: 6 ITF
- Highest ranking: No. 584 (21 November 2016)

Team competitions
- Davis Cup: 2–4
- Last updated on: 31 December 2024.

- Seol Jae-min
- Hangul: 조민혁
- RR: Jo Minhyeok
- MR: Cho Minhyŏk

Seol Jae-min (born 15 January 1990) is a South Korean former professional tennis player who was born in Gyeonggi Province, South Korea.

Seol has a career high ATP singles ranking of 950 achieved on 24 August 2015 and a career high ATP doubles ranking of 584, achieved on 21 November 2016. Seol has won six ITF doubles titles.

Seol has represented South Korea at the Davis Cup, where he has a win–loss record of 2–4. Seol has also represented South Korea in the Summer Universiade and won a gold medal in the Men's Team and a bronze medal in the Men's Doubles at the 2011 Summer Universiade in Shenzhen.
