= Weightlifting at the 2011 Summer Universiade =

Weightlifting was contested at the 2011 Summer Universiade from August 13 to August 18 at the Comprehensive Training Hall and the Weightlifting Training Hall in Shenzhen Sport School in Shenzhen, China. Men's and women's individual and team events were held.

== Medal summary ==
=== Medal table ===
* Host nation (China)

Rank	Nation	Gold	Silver	Bronze	Total
1	China (CHN)*	4	4	0	8
2	Russia (RUS)	4	1	2	7
3	Indonesia (INA)	2	1	0	3
4	North Korea (PRK)	1	2	0	3
5	Chinese Taipei (TPE)	1	1	1	3
6	Thailand (THA)	1	0	3	4
7	Armenia (ARM)	1	0	1	2
8	Hungary (HUN)	1	0	0	1
9	South Korea (KOR)	0	2	2	4
10	Ukraine (UKR)	0	2	1	3
11	Kazakhstan (KAZ)	0	1	0	1
11	Lithuania (LTU)	0	1	0	1
13	Turkey (TUR)	0	0	2	2
14	Canada (CAN)	0	0	1	1
14	Egypt (EGY)	0	0	1	1
14	Mexico (MEX)	0	0	1	1
Totals (16 entries)		15	15	15	45

=== Men's events ===
Event	Gold		Silver		Bronze	
56 kg	Li Lizhi; China	273	Surahmat bin Suwoto Wijoyo; Indonesia	239	Tan Chichung; Chinese Taipei	236
62 kg	Eko Yuli Irawan; Indonesia	310	Chen Meilong; China	285	Withawat Kritphet; Thailand	283
69 kg	Deni; Indonesia	321	Won Jeong Sik; South Korea	318	Mohamed Sultan; Egypt	312
77 kg	Aghasi Aghasyan; Armenia	337	Viacheslav Lastukhin; Russia	332	Victor Kharchenko; Russia	331
85 kg	Rinat Kireev; Russia	365	Zhang Shichong; China	353	Ryu Jun Ho; South Korea	351
94 kg	Andrey Demanov; Russia	390	Aurimas Didžbalis; Lithuania	387	Ibrahim Arat; Turkey	373
105 kg	Gennady Muratov; Russia	400	Mykola Hordiychuk; Ukraine	382	Aleksey Lovchev; Russia	375
+105 kg	Péter Nagy; Hungary	412	Oleg Proshak; Ukraine	402	Hayk Hakobian; Armenia	402

=== Women's events ===
Event	Gold		Silver		Bronze	
48 kg	Xiao Hongyu; China	188	Ryang Chun-hwa; North Korea	186	Pensiri Laosirikul; Thailand	184
53 kg	Ji Jing; China	222	Hsu Shu-ching; Chinese Taipei	207	Pramsiri Bunphithak; Thailand	205
58 kg	O Jong-ae; North Korea	220	Luo Liqin; China	211	Monica Patricia Dominguez Lara; Mexico	201
63 kg	Ho Hsiao-Chun; Chinese Taipei	211	Kim Yun-jong; North Korea	207	Seda İnce; Turkey	203
69 kg	Kang Yue; China	240	Mun Yu-ra; South Korea	238	Marie-Ève Beauchemin-Nadeau; Canada	235
75 kg	Khanittha Petanang; Thailand	236	Li Yang; China	234	Lee Ae-ra; South Korea	226
+75 kg	Anastasia Chernykh; Russia	250	Alexandra Aborneva; Kazakhstan	247	Daryna Goncharova; Ukraine	245
