= Gymnastics at the 2011 Summer Universiade – Women's uneven bars =

The Women's uneven bars competition at the 2011 Summer Universiade in Shenzhen, China was held at the Bao'an Stadium on August 16. Yu Minobe and Mai Yamagishi from Japan won the gold and silver, Angelina Kysla from Ukraine took the bronze.

== Medalists ==
Gold	Silver	Bronze
Yu Minobe; Japan	Mai Yamagishi; Japan	Angelina Kysla; Ukraine

== Final results ==
Rank	Gymnast	Nation	D Score	E Score	Pen.	Total
1st place, gold medalist(s)	Yu Minobe	Japan	6.200	8.275		14.475
2nd place, silver medalist(s)	Mai Yamagishi	Japan	5.800	8.450		14.250
3rd place, bronze medalist(s)	Angelina Kysla	Ukraine	5.600	8.250		13.850
4	Yana Demyanchuk	Ukraine	5.800	8.025		13.825
5	Guan Wenli	China	5.300	8.300		13.600
6	Irina Sazonova	Russia	5.600	7.875		13.475
7	Kristýna Pálešová	Czech Republic	5.600	7.350		12.950
8	Jo Hyun-joo^{*}	South Korea	0.000	0.000		0.000

* Jo Hyun-joo gave up the competition due her injury on all-around final.
