= Klaudia Jans-Ignacik =

Polish tennis player

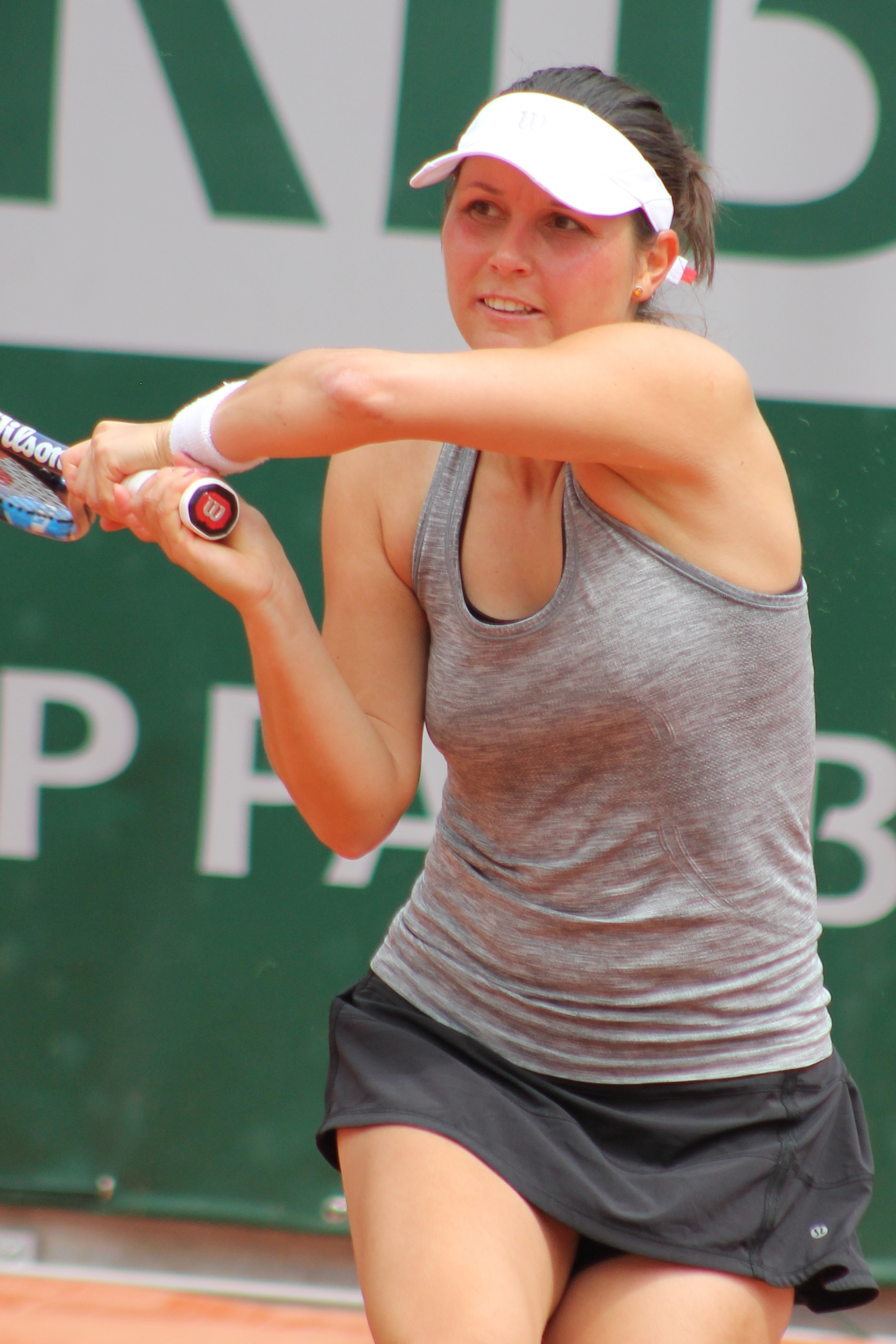
- Country (sports): Poland
- Born: 24 September 1984 (age 41) Gdynia
- Height: 1.73 m (5 ft 8 in)
- Turned pro: 2000
- Retired: 2016
- Plays: Right (two-handed backhand)
- Prize money: $866,663

Singles
- Career record: 60–82
- Career titles: 1 ITF
- Highest ranking: No. 410 (16 August 2004)

Doubles
- Career record: 265–295
- Career titles: 3 WTA, 11 ITF
- Highest ranking: No. 28 (10 September 2012)

Grand Slam doubles results
- Australian Open: QF (2015)
- French Open: 2R (2007, 2009)
- Wimbledon: 2R (2009, 2011, 2012, 2014)
- US Open: 3R (2008)

Grand Slam mixed doubles results
- Australian Open: 1R (2012)
- French Open: F (2012)
- Wimbledon: 2R (2010, 2015)
- US Open: 2R (2012)

Team competitions
- Fed Cup: 20–12
Medal record
Representing Poland
Women's tennis
Universiade
| Silver medal – second place | 2009 Belgrade | Singles |
| Silver medal – second place | 2009 Belgrade | Doubles |
| Silver medal – second place | 2009 Belgrade | Team |

Klaudia Jans-Ignacik (née Jans; born 24 September 1984) is a Polish former professional tennis player. On 16 August 2004, she reached her best singles ranking of 410. On 10 September 2012, she peaked at No. 28 in the doubles rankings.

Jans-Ignacik won three WTA Tour doubles tournaments, 2009 Andalucia Tennis Experience with Alicja Rosolska, 2012 Internationaux de Strasbourg with Olga Govortsova, and 2012 Rogers Cup with Kristina Mladenovic.

In 2012, she advanced to her first major final at the French Open, with Santiago Gonzalez in the mixed-doubles tournament. Jans-Ignacik is one of ten Polish tennis players in history who played in a Grand Slam final, others being Jadwiga Jędrzejowska, Wojciech Fibak, Mariusz Fyrstenberg, Łukasz Kubot, Marcin Matkowski, Agnieszka Radwańska, Alicja Rosolska, Iga Świątek and Jan Zieliński.

She represented Poland in the Fed Cup and both the 2008 and 2012 Summer Olympics. Playing for Poland at the Fed Cup, Jans-Ignacik has a win–loss record of 20–12.

Klaudia married Bartosz Ignacik in 2011 and added his surname to her own. On 31 December 2012, Jans-Ignacik announced that she was pregnant with her first child and would miss the entire 2013 WTA Tour. On 1 August 2013, she gave birth to her first daughter Aniela Ignacik.

In 2014, she returned to professional competitions and reached six doubles semifinals, one of them in her home country, at the Katowice Open.

In January 2015, Jans-Ignacik advanced to her first women's doubles major quarterfinal, with Andreja Klepač, at the Australian Open. They lost in straight sets to Chan Yung-jan and Zheng Jie.

On 1 September 2016, Jans-Ignacik announced her retirement from professional tennis.

== Grand Slam tournaments ==
=== Mixed doubles: 1 (runner-up) ===
| Result | Year | Championship | Surface | Partner | Opponents | Score |
|---|---|---|---|---|---|---|
| Loss | 2012 | French Open | Clay | (Mexico) Santiago González | (India) Sania Mirza (India) Mahesh Bhupathi | 6–7^{(3–7)}, 1–6 |

== Other significant finals ==
=== Premier Mandatory/Premier 5 tournaments ===
==== Doubles: 1 (title) ====
| Result | Year | Tournament | Surface | Partner | Opponents | Score |
|---|---|---|---|---|---|---|
| Win | 2012 | Canadian Open (Montreal) | Hard | (France) Kristina Mladenovic | (Russia) Nadia Petrova (Slovenia) Katarina Srebotnik | 7–5, 2–6, [10–7] |

== WTA Tour finals ==
=== Doubles: 10 (3 titles, 7 runner-ups) ===
| Legend Premier M & Premier 5 (1–0) Premier (0–2) International (2–5) | Finals by surface Hard (1–3) Clay (2–4) |

| Result | W/L | Date | Tournament | Surface | Partner | Opponents | Score |
|---|---|---|---|---|---|---|---|
| Loss | 0–1 | Aug 2004 | Warsaw Open, Poland | Clay | (Poland) Alicja Rosolska | (Spain) Nuria Llagostera Vives (Spain) Marta Marrero | 4–6, 3–6 |
| Loss | 0–2 | Apr 2005 | Warsaw Open, Poland | Clay | (Poland) Alicja Rosolska | (Ukraine) Tatiana Perebiynis (Czech Republic) Barbora Záhlavová-Strýcová | 1–6, 4–6 |
| Loss | 0–3 | Jul 2005 | Palermo Ladies Open, Italy | Clay | (Poland) Alicja Rosolska | (Italy) Giulia Casoni (Ukraine) Mariya Koryttseva | 6–4, 3–6, 5–7 |
| Loss | 0–4 | Jan 2009 | Brisbane International, Australia | Hard | (Poland) Alicja Rosolska | (Germany) Anna-Lena Grönefeld (United States) Vania King | 6–3, 5–7, [5–10] |
| Win | 1–4 | Apr 2009 | Andalucia Tennis Experience, Spain | Clay | (Poland) Alicja Rosolska | (Spain) Anabel Medina Garrigues (Spain) Virginia Ruano Pascual | 6–3, 6–3 |
| Loss | 1–5 | Oct 2009 | Ladies Linz, Austria | Hard (i) | (Poland) Alicja Rosolska | (Germany) Anna-Lena Grönefeld (Slovenia) Katarina Srebotnik | 1–6, 4–6 |
| Loss | 1–6 | Jan 2011 | Brisbane International, Australia | Hard | (Poland) Alicja Rosolska | (Russia) Alisa Kleybanova (Russia) Anastasia Pavlyuchenkova | 3–6, 5–7 |
| Loss | 1–7 | May 2011 | Brussels Open, Belgium | Clay | (Poland) Alicja Rosolska | (Czech Republic) Andrea Hlaváčková (Kazakhstan) Galina Voskoboeva | 6–3, 0–6, [5–10] |
| Win | 2–7 | May 2012 | Internationaux de Strasbourg, France | Clay | (Belarus) Olga Govortsova | (South Africa) Natalie Grandin (Czech Republic) Vladimíra Uhlířová | 6–7^{(4–7)}, 6–3, [10–3] |
| Win | 3–7 | Aug 2012 | Canadian Open | Hard | (France) Kristina Mladenovic | (Russia) Nadia Petrova (Slovenia) Katarina Srebotnik | 7–5, 2–6, [10–7] |

== WTA Challenger finals ==
=== Doubles: 1 (runner-up) ===
| Result | Date | Tournament | Surface | Partner | Opponents | Score |
|---|---|---|---|---|---|---|
| Loss | 14 March 2016 | San Antonio Open, US | Hard | (Australia) Anastasia Rodionova | (Germany) Anna-Lena Grönefeld (United States) Nicole Melichar | 1–6, 3–6 |

== ITF Circuit finals ==
=== Singles (1–1) ===
| Legend $10,000 tournaments | Finals by surface Clay (1–1) |

| Result | No. | Date | Location | Surface | Opponent | Score |
|---|---|---|---|---|---|---|
| Loss | 1. | 15 September 2003 | Chieti, Italy | Clay | (Sweden) Aleksandra Srndovic | 5–7, 1–6 |
| Win | 1. | 23 May 2004 | Gdynia, Poland | Clay | (Poland) Magdalena Kiszczyńska | 6–4, 3–6, 6–4 |

=== Doubles (11–8) ===
| Legend $100,000 tournaments $75,000 tournaments $50,000 tournaments $25,000 tournaments $10,000 tournaments | Finals by surface Hard (3–3) Clay (7–5) Carpet (1–0) |

| Result | No. | Date | Tier | Tournament | Surface | Partner | Opponents | Score |
|---|---|---|---|---|---|---|---|---|
| Win | 1. | 10 August 2003 | 10,000 | ITF Gdynia, Poland | Clay | (Poland) Alicja Rosolska | (Latvia) Irina Kuzmina (Poland) Monika Schneider | 7–5, 6–2 |
| Loss | 1. | 15 September 2003 | 10,000 | ITF Chieti, Italy | Clay | (Poland) Alicja Rosolska | (Netherlands) Kika Hogendoorn (Austria) Betina Pirker | 3–6, 6–7^{(6–8)} |
| Win | 2. | 22 September 2003 | 10,000 | ITF Gdynia, Poland | Clay | (Poland) Alicja Rosolska | (Italy) Claudia Ivone (Italy) Giulia Meruzzi | 6–0, 6–3 |
| Loss | 2. | 1 February 2004 | 10,000 | ITF Tipton, Great Britain | Hard (i) | (Poland) Alicja Rosolska | (United Kingdom) Rebecca Llewellyn (United Kingdom) Melanie South | 6–2, 1–6, 4–6 |
| Win | 3. | 9 February 2004 | 25,000 | ITF Warsaw, Poland | Hard (i) | (Poland) Alicja Rosolska | (Hungary) Zsófia Gubacsi (Hungary) Kira Nagy | 6–4, 6–3 |
| Loss | 3. | 7 July 2004 | 25,000 | Grado Tennis Cup, Italy | Clay | (Poland) Alicja Rosolska | (Spain) Rosa María Andrés Rodríguez (Romania) Andreea Ehritt-Vanc | 2–6, 2–6 |
| Win | 4. | 8 August 2004 | 10,000 | ITF Gdynia, Poland | Clay | (Poland) Alicja Rosolska | (Ukraine) Natalia Bogdanova (Ukraine) Valeria Bondarenko | 6–2, 6–4 |
| Win | 5. | 31 August 2004 | 10,000 | ITF Warsaw, Poland | Clay | (Poland) Alicja Rosolska | (Slovakia) Martina Babáková (Czech Republic) Iveta Gerlová | 6–2, 6–3 |
| Loss | 4. | 7 February 2005 | 25,000 | ITF Capriolo, Italy | Hard (i) | (Poland) Alicja Rosolska | (Ukraine) Mariya Koryttseva (Finland) Emma Laine | 6–3, 4–6, 5–7 |
| Win | 6. | 8 April 2006 | 75,000 | ITF Dinan, France | Clay (i) | (Slovakia) Henrieta Nagyová | (Romania) Mădălina Gojnea (Poland) Agnieszka Radwańska | 3–6, 6–2, 6–4 |
| Loss | 5. | 15 April 2006 | 25,000 | Open de Biarritz, France | Clay | (Poland) Alicja Rosolska | (Russia) Nina Bratchikova (Kazakhstan) Yaroslava Shvedova | 3–6, 2–6 |
| Loss | 6. | 9 September 2006 | 75,000 | Open Denain, France | Clay | (Poland) Alicja Rosolska | (Switzerland) Romina Oprandi (Germany) Jasmin Woehr | 6–4, 2–6, 4–6 |
| Win | 7. | 8 October 2006 | 75,000 | ITF Barcelona, Spain | Clay | (Poland) Alicja Rosolska | (Romania) Edina Gallovits-Hall (Germany) Vanessa Henke | 6–1, 6–2 |
| Win | 8. | 28 October 2006 | 75,000 | Slovak Open, Slovakia | Hard (i) | (Poland) Alicja Rosolska | (Czech Republic) Lucie Hradecká (Czech Republic) Michaela Paštiková | 6–1, 6–3 |
| Win | 9. | 1 December 2006 | 50,000 | ITF Milan, Italy | Carpet (i) | (Poland) Alicja Rosolska | (Ukraine) Mariya Koryttseva (Finland) Emma Laine | 6–7^{(5–7)}, 7–5, 6–4 |
| Loss | 7. | 18 May 2007 | 75,000 | Zagreb Open, Croatia | Clay | (Poland) Alicja Rosolska | (Finland) Emma Laine (Hungary) Ágnes Szávay | 1–6, 2–6 |
| Win | 10. | 13 October 2007 | 50,000 | Open de Touraine, France | Hard (i) | (Poland) Alicja Rosolska | (Czech Republic) Petra Cetkovská (Czech Republic) Barbora Strýcová | 6–3, 7–5 |
| Loss | 8. | 24 November 2007 | 100,000 | ITF Poitiers, France | Hard (i) | (Poland) Alicja Rosolska | (Russia) Alla Kudryavtseva (Russia) Anastasia Pavlyuchenkova | 6–2, 4–6, [1–10] |
| Win | 11. | 6 June 2008 | 75,000 | ITF Rome, Italy | Clay | (Poland) Alicja Rosolska | (Russia) Alina Jidkova (Canada) Marie-Ève Pelletier | 6–3, 6–1 |

== Doubles performance timeline ==
Key
| W | F | SF | QF | #R | RR | Q# | DNQ | A | NH |

(W) winner; (F) finalist; (SF) semifinalist; (QF) quarterfinalist; (#R) rounds 4, 3, 2, 1; (RR) round-robin stage; (Q#) qualification round; (DNQ) did not qualify; (A) absent; (NH) not held; (SR) strike rate (events won / competed); (W–L) win–loss record.

| Tournament | 2007 | 2008 | 2009 | 2010 | 2011 | 2012 | 2013 | 2014 | 2015 | 2016 | W-L |
|---|---|---|---|---|---|---|---|---|---|---|---|
Grand Slam tournaments
| Australian Open | 1R | 2R | 2R | 2R | 1R | 2R | A | A | QF | 1R | 7–8 |
| French Open | 2R | 1R | 2R | 1R | 1R | 1R | A | 1R | 1R | 1R | 2–9 |
| Wimbledon | 1R | 1R | 2R | 1R | 2R | 2R | A | 2R | 1R | 1R | 4–9 |
| US Open | 2R | 3R | 2R | 2R | 1R | 2R | A | A | 1R | A | 6–7 |
| Win–loss | 2–4 | 3–4 | 4–4 | 2–4 | 1–4 | 3–4 | 0–0 | 1–2 | 3–4 | 0–3 | 19–33 |
Olympic Games
| Summer Olympics | NH | 1R | Not Held | | | 1R | Not Held | | | 1R | 0–3 |
