= Diving at the 2011 Summer Universiade =

Chinese diving sport event

Diving was a sport at the 2011 Summer Universiade from August 16 to August 22 at the Shenzhen Swimming and Diving Gym in Shenzhen, China. Men's and women's 1 and 3 metre springboard, 10 metre platform, synchronized 3 and 10 metre platform, and team events will be held.

== Medal summary ==
=== Medal table ===
Rank	Nation	Gold	Silver	Bronze	Total
1	China (CHN)	11	2	2	15
2	Mexico (MEX)	1	3	3	7
3	Russia (RUS)	0	2	2	4
4	Ukraine (UKR)	0	2	1	3
4	United States (USA)	0	2	1	3
6	Malaysia (MAS)	0	1	2	3
7	Japan (JPN)	0	0	1	1
Totals (7 entries)		12	12	12	36

=== Men's events ===
Event	Gold		Silver		Bronze	
1 metre springboard	Lin Jin; China	487.00	Sun Zhiyi; China	460.20	Illya Kvasha; Ukraine	454.55
3 metre springboard	He Chong; China	539.30	Julián Sánchez; Mexico	515.50	Ilya Zakharov; Russia	471.95
10 metre platform	Wu Jun; China	537.00	Victor Minibaev; Russia	528.75	Rommel Pacheco; Mexico	492.05
Synchronized 3 metre platform	China (CHN); Qin Kai; Lin Jin	419.07	Mexico (MEX); Rommel Pacheco; Jonathan Ruvalcaba	385.32	Japan (JPN); Yu Okamoto; Sho Sakai	374.40
Synchronized 10 metre platform	China (CHN); Huo Liang; Lin Yue	474.69	Russia (RUS); Victor Minibaev; Ilya Zakharov	453.42	Mexico (MEX); Rommel Pacheco; Jonathan Ruvalcaba	421.50
Team	China (CHN)	3718.46	Ukraine (UKR)	3239.83	Russia (RUS)	3239.69

=== Women's events ===
Event	Gold		Silver		Bronze	
1 metre springboard	Shi Tingmao; China	320.65	Kelci Bryant; United States	304.00	Chen Ye; China	283.30
3 metre springboard	He Zi; China	384.70	Wang Han; China	370.00	Paola Espinosa; Mexico	323.60
10 metre platform	Paola Espinosa; Mexico	385.25	Pandelela Rinong; Malaysia	381.75	Wang Xin; China	370.55
Synchronized 3 metre platform	China (CHN); He Zi; Wang Han	334.20	Ukraine (UKR); Olena Fedorova; Hanna Pysmenska	301.50	United States (USA); Bianca Alvarez; Carrie Dragland	292.50
Synchronized 10 metre platform	China (CHN); Wang Xin; Chen Ruolin	349.98	Mexico (MEX); Paola Espinosa; Tatiana Ortiz	330.48	Malaysia (MAS); Pandelela Rinong; Mun Yee Leong	316.98
Team	China (CHN)	2674.18	United States (USA)	2373.03	Malaysia (MAS)	2336.23
