= Christopher Koderisch =

German former professional tennis player

- Country (sports): Germany
- Born: 25 November 1984 (age 40); Lemgo, West Germany
- Height: 5 ft 11 in (180 cm)
- Prize money: $16,371

Singles
- Career record: 0–1 (ATP Tour)
- Highest ranking: No. 595 (18 Jul 2005)

Doubles
- Highest ranking: No. 473 (3 Oct 2005)

Christopher Koderisch (born 25 November 1984) is a German former professional tennis player.

Koderisch, known as "Toto", comes from the North Rhine-Westphalia town of Lemgo and trained out of Halle, turning professional in 2003 after graduating high school.

Most of his career was spent at ITF Futures level but he made an ATP Tour main draw appearance in 2003, as a wildcard at the Gerry Weber Open in Halle, where he was beaten in the first round by the fifth seeded Younes El Aynaoui.

Later a student at Bielefeld University, Koderisch represented Germany at the 2011 Summer Universiade in Shenzhen.

Koderisch had an on screen role as a tennis player in the 2018 French film Amanda and was a consultant for an RTL television film biopic Der Spieler about Boris Becker.

== ITF Futures titles ==
=== Doubles: (1) ===
No.	Date	Tournament	Surface	Partner	Opponents	Score
1.	Jul 2005	Austria F4, Telfs	Clay	(Germany) Bastian Knittel	(Germany) Benedikt Dorsch (Germany) Mischa Zverev	2–1, ret.
