= Willem Steenkamp =

South African writer and citizen soldier

Major Willem Petrus Steenkamp MMM JCD JP
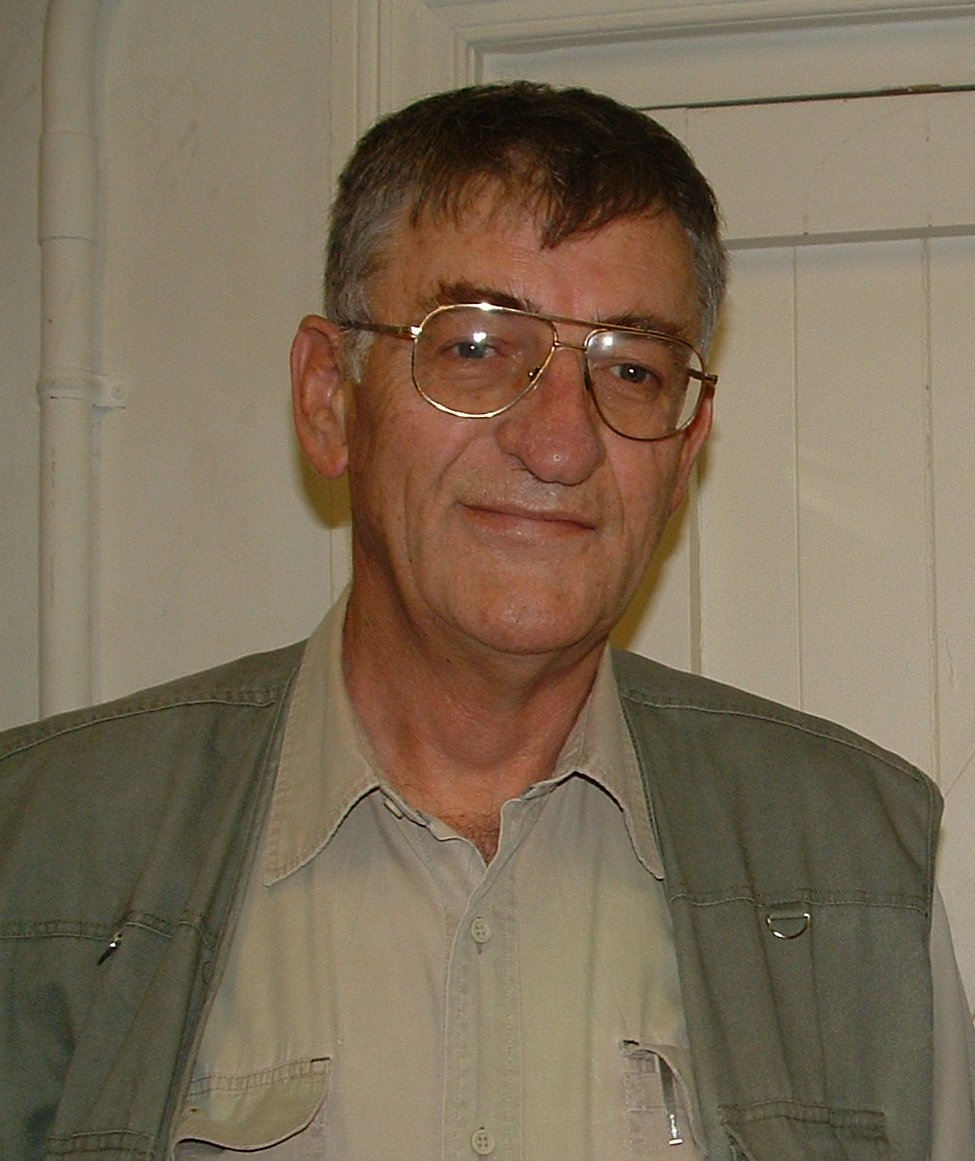
- Born: 2 May 1940 (age 86); Cape Town
- Military career
- Allegiance: South Africa; South Africa
- Branch: South African Army; South African Army
- Rank: Major
- Unit: Cape Town Highlanders Regiment (CTH)
- Awards: Badge for Voluntary Reserve Force Service; Chief of the Army's Commendation

Willem Steenkamp (born May 2, 1940) is a South African author, journalist, historian, military analyst and citizen soldier. He has published a number of books and consults widely in military affairs.

== Awards ==
- Cited in 1967 and 1968 in United Press International's annual selection of its best news feature articles worldwide.
- Awarded the Settlers' Prize for Enterprising Journalism in 1982.
- Awarded the Maskew Miller Prize (co-winner with James Ambrose Brown) in 1983 for the Anglo-Boer War novel The Blockhouse.
- Awarded the Lady Usher Memorial Prize in 1985 for the historical novel The Horse Thief.
- Awarded the Barcom Prize for Professional Military Writing in 1988 for an essay on future amphibious assault personnel requirements.

== Appointments ==
- Justice of the peace (appointed 1993).
- UN international election observer (appointed 1994).
- Member of the Ceremonial Staff Board (advisory body to the SANDF's Director of Ceremonial and Military Music) up to 2004.
- Member of the VOC Foundation.

== Military service ==
=== List of postings and tasks ===
- 1958: Called up for Active Citizen Force service: Study deferment.
- 1961 – 1965: Routine non-continuous regimental service.
- 1966 – 1969: On inactive reserve.
- 1969 – 1979: Regimental service (training and operational).
- 1980 – 1983: Seconded to 71 Motorised Brigade staff.
- 1984 – 1990: Regimental service (training and operational).
- 1990 – 1992: Seconded to 75 Motorised Brigade/9 SA Division staff.
- 1993 – to date: Regimental service, in various capacities: inter alia officer in charge of designing and implementing the wreath-laying at Woltemade Cemetery by HM Queen Elizabeth II, 1995.
- Extra-regimental/staff employment:
  - Secondments to 71 Motorised Brigade and 75 Motorised Brigade/9 SA Division, as noted.
  - Observer on three external operations, 1979 – 1985.
  - Minute-taker/diarist: Operation Sclera (1984 South African – Angolan Joint Monitoring Commission).
  - Member/scriba of official SADF delegation sent to attend national convention of United States Reserve Officers' Association at Nashville, Tennessee, July 1993; also visited ROA head office in Washington DC for confidential briefing to convey to SA Minister of Defence
- 1997 – 1998: Member of the SA National Defence Force's Education, Training and Development Team (with Lt Col A. M. Marriner JCD) revising Reserve Force training

=== Military Awards ===
Badge for Voluntary Reserve Force Service (Service Award)
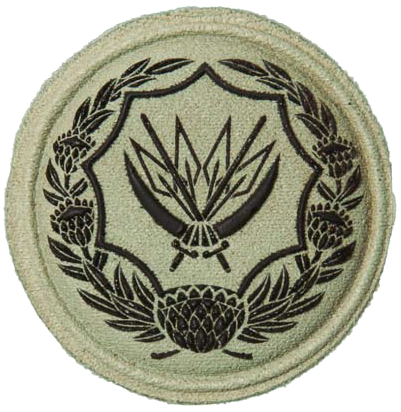
Five Years Voluntary Service. Black on Thatch beige, Embossed.

- Military Merit Medal (MMM)
- Pro Patria Medal
- Southern Africa Medal
- General Service Medal (South Africa)
- John Chard Decoration (JCD)
- John Chard Medal
- Unitas (Unity) Medal
- Chief of the Army's Commendation

== Published books ==
- Ngami! (1971). Fictionalised re-telling in Afrikaans, for mid-teenagers, of explorer Charles John Andersson's epic mid-19th-Century trek from Walvis Bay to Lake Ngami.
- Land of the Thirst King (1975 – reprinted 1979). Historical/contemporary travel book about Namaqualand (North-West Cape Province).
- Adeus Angola (1976). First account of the initial South African military incursion into Angola.
- The Soldiers (1978). Short interlinked biographies of Generals Christiaan de Wet, Koos de la Rey, Sir Henry Timson Lukin, Sir Jaap van Deventer, Dan Pienaar and Evered Poole
- Poor Man's Bioscope (1979). Historical/contemporary travel book about Cape Town
- Moedverloor (1980). Historical novel, in Afrikaans, about Great Namaqualand (now Namibia) in the 19th Century
- Sê vir Leonardo (1980). Contemporary action novel, in Afrikaans, set in Cape Town
- Aircraft of the South African Air Force (1981). Illustrated survey of contemporary SAAF aircraft; later reprinted as Jane's Book of the SAAF
- Borderstrike! (1983). First detailed account of early South African military incursions into Angola, 1978–1980. Expanded/re-edited edition 2003
- Namakwalandse Oustories (1983). Re-telling, in Afrikaans, of traditional Namaqualand folk-tales
- Christmas Story/Kersverhaal (1984). Re-telling of the Nativity, in separate English and Afrikaans versions, from the viewpoint of the animals in the stable
- The Horse Thief (1985). Historical novel set in Namaqualand in the 1870s (winner of 1985 Lady Usher Memorial Prize, and later staged at Nico Malan Theatre, Cape Town)
- Blake's Woman (1986). Historical novel set in 19th-Century Great Namaqualand (now Namibia)
- The Blockhouse (1987). Historical novel set at the end of the Second Anglo-Boer War (co-winner of Maskew Miller Prize)
- South Africa's Border War, 1966–1989 (1989). Illustrated history of the SWA/Namibian border war
- Jim Zulu (2006). Historical novel set in the Kimberley diamond diggings area of the 1880s, inspired by South Africa's only known case of public lynching
- Assegais, Drums and Dragoons (2012). The early military and social history of the Cape of Good Hope, 1510–1806
- The Black Beret: the history of the SA Armoured Corps, Volume 1 (early beginnings up to 842 Madagascar campaign) 2016)
- SA's Border War 1966–1989 (revised and updated edition) (2016)
- SA se Grensoorlog 1966–1989 (revised and updated edition) (2016)
- Mobility Conquers: The Story of 61 Mechanised Battalion Group 1978–2005, with Helmoed-Römer Heitman (September 2016)
- The Black Beret: the History of South Africa's Armoured Forces. Volume 2 (The Italian Campaign 1943-45 and Post-War South Africa 1946-1961) 2017)

Title	Author	Type	Genre	Topic	Year
Borderstrike! South Africa into Angola	Willem Steenkamp	Non-Fiction	Military History	Military	2006
Assegais, Drums & Dragoons: A Military and Social History of the Cape	Willem Steenkamp	Non-Fiction	Military History	Military	2012
South Africa's border war, 1966–1989	Willem Steenkamp	Non-Fiction	Military History	Military	1989
Soldiers Verse: An Anthology of Poetry	John Dovey (Editor)	Non-Fiction	Poetry	Military	2006
Jim Zulu	Willem Steenkamp	Fiction	Historical	Novel	2006
Blake's Woman	Willem Steenkamp	Fiction	Historical	Novel	2007
Freedom Park: Roots and Solutions	Willem Steenkamp	Non-Fiction	Editorial	Military	2007
Aphorisms and Observations for the Fighting Soldier	Willem Steenkamp	Non-Fiction	Military	Military	2007
