= Manon Garcia =

French philosopher

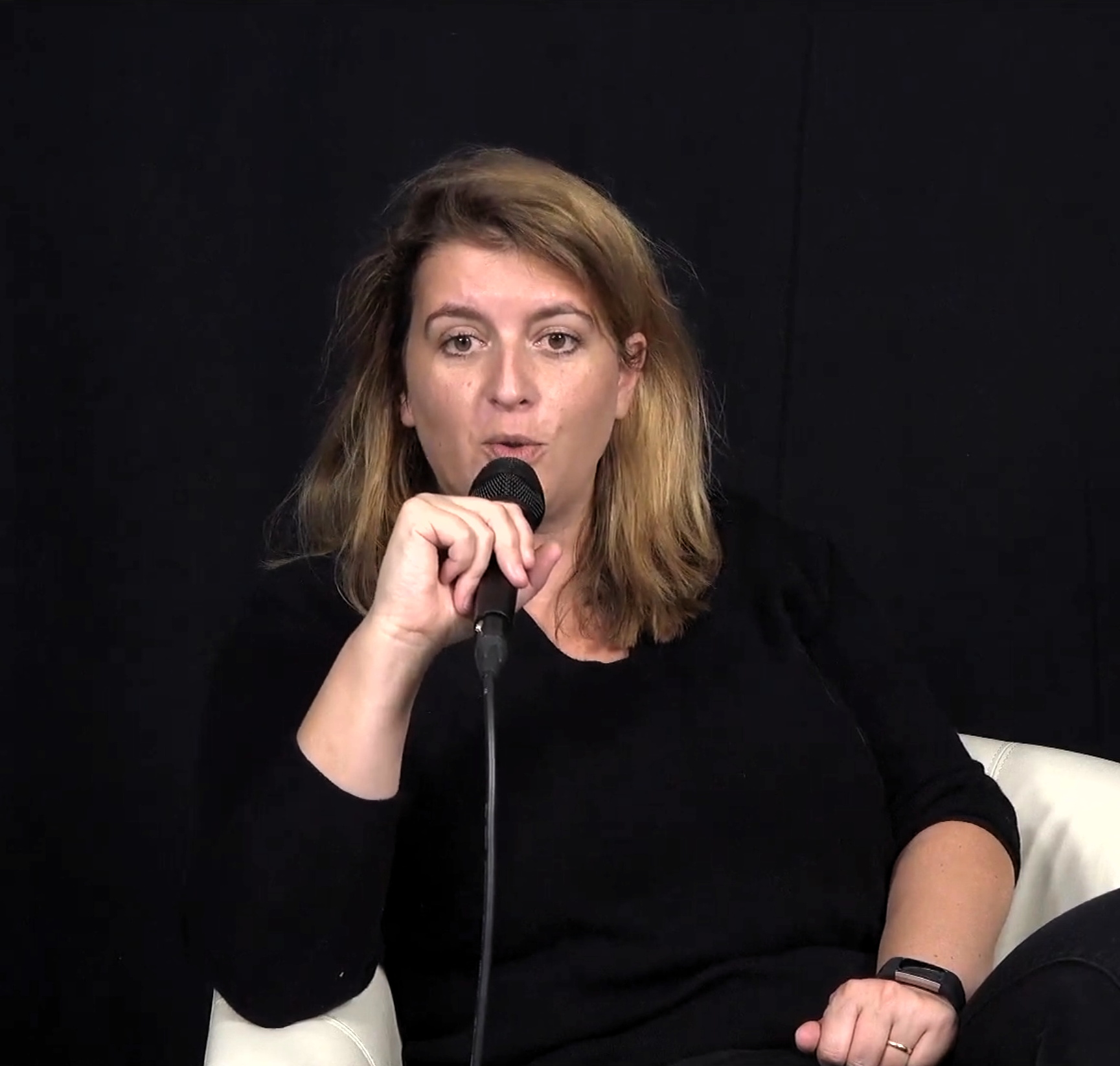
- Manon Garcia in 2023
- Born: 1985 (age 40–41)

Education
- Education: École Normale Supérieure; University of Paris I
- Doctoral advisor: Sandra Laugier

Philosophical work
- Era: Contemporary philosophy
- Region: Western philosophy
- School: French feminism
- Institutions: Harvard University; University of Chicago; Yale University; Freie Universität Berlin
- Main interests: Political philosophy Moral philosophy
- Notable ideas: Feminist analysis of submission

Manon Garcia (born 1985) is a French philosopher, specializing in feminist philosophy. Her 2021 book We Are Not Born Submissive (original French title On ne naît pas soumise, on le devient) has been translated into several languages besides English, including Japanese, Chinese, Korean, German and Spanish.

== Early life and education ==
Garcia studied at the École Normale Supérieure and obtained the agrégation in philosophy in 2014. In 2017, she completed her doctorate at the University of Paris I with a thesis on the thought of Simone de Beauvoir.

== Career ==
She held positions at Harvard University, at the University of Chicago and at Yale University before becoming a junior professor at the Freie Universität Berlin in 2022.

In her book We Are Not Born Submissive (2021, originally published in French in 2018) she distinguishes between two kinds of female submission: one by force, which leaves no choice, and another involving a kind of cost–benefit analysis, which, however, she links not to any "feminine nature", but to social conditioning. To highlight the paradox in a consented female submission, she utilizes the thought of Simone de Beauvoir. In 2021 she published The Joy of Consent, where she argues that sexual consent is not a simple concept and advocates the development of a "contextually sensitive approach".

After attending part of the trial that led to multiple men being convicted of raping Gisèle Pelicot, in 2025 Garcia published Living with Men: Reflections on the Pelicot Trial.

== Awards and distinctions ==
Her book La conversation des sexes (Éditions Flammarion, 2021) won the Prix PhiloMonaco essay prize in 2022. It is rendered in English translation as The Joy of Consent: A Philosophy of Good Sex, published by Belknap Press in 2023.

== Publications ==
=== In English ===
- Garcia, Manon (2021). We Are Not Born Submissive: How Patriarchy Shapes Women's Lives. Princeton University Press. ISBN 978-0691201825.
- Garcia, Manon (2023). The Joy of Consent: A Philosophy of Good Sex. Belknap Press. ISBN 978-0674279131.
- Garcia, Manon (2025). Living with Men: Reflections on the Pelicot Trial. Polity. ISBN 9781509573134.

=== In French ===
- On ne naît pas soumise, on le devient. Climats, 2018
- La Conversation des sexes: Philosophie du consentement. Climats, 2021
- 'Key texts of feminist philosophy' (ed.), Librairie philosophique J. Vrin, "Key Texts", 2021
- Vivre avec les hommes: Réflexions sur le procès Pelicot. Climats, 2025
- "De l'oppression à l'indépendance. La philosophie de l'amour dans Le Deuxième Sexe." ['From Oppression to Independence: Beauvoir’s Philosophy of Love in The Second Sex.'] Philosophie 144 (2020) 48–63
