= Dorian Descloix =

French tennis player (born 1988)

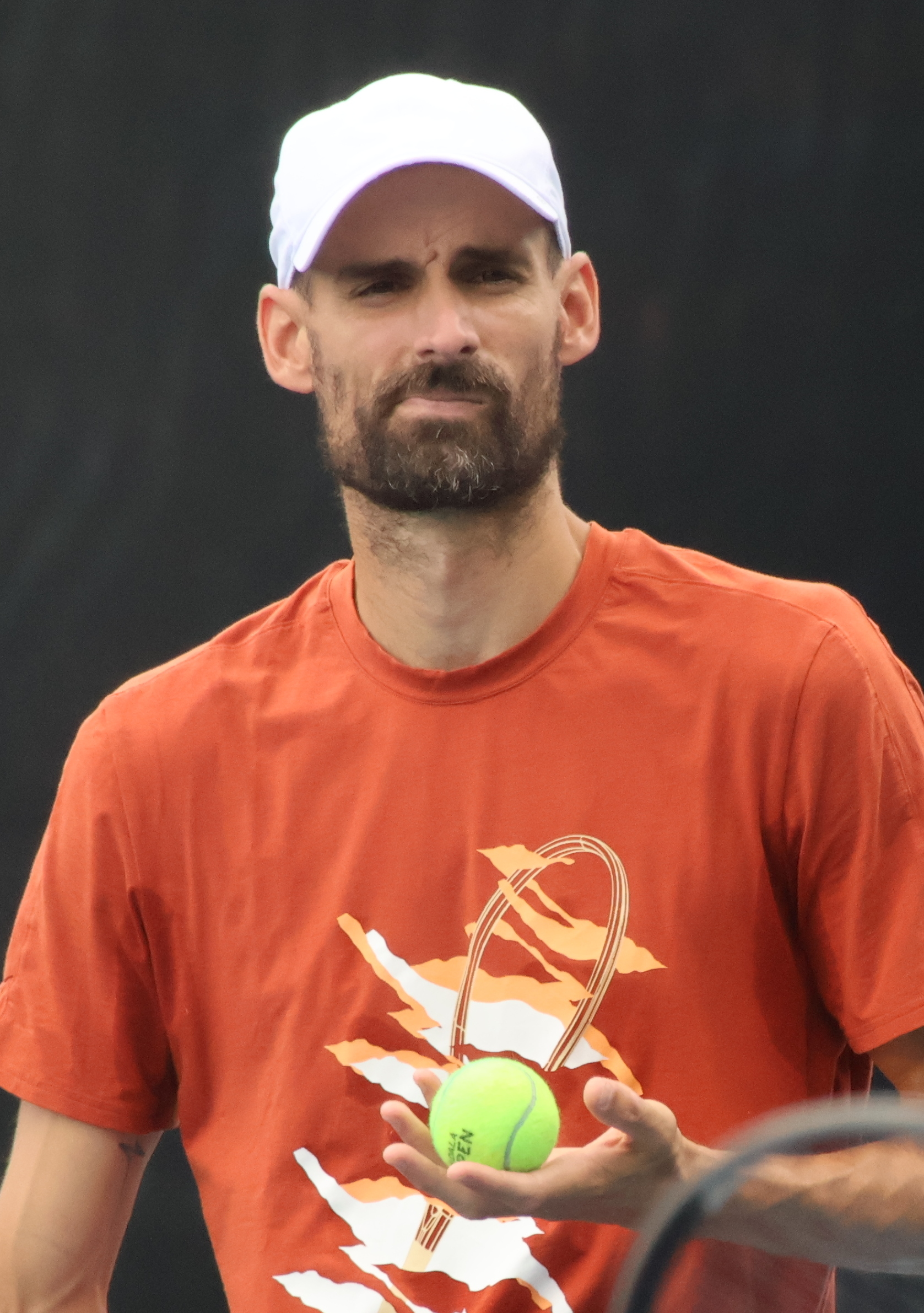
- Descloix in 2025
- Country (sports): France
- Residence: Montpellier, France
- Born: 14 March 1988 (age 37) Montpellier, France
- Height: 1.93 m (6 ft 4 in)
- Retired: November 2020
- Plays: Right-handed (one-handed backhand)
- Prize money: $33,419

Singles
- Career record: 0–0 (at ATP Tour level, Grand Slam level, and in Davis Cup)
- Career titles: 0 ITF
- Highest ranking: No. 666 (26 July 2010)

Doubles
- Career record: 0–1 (at ATP Tour level, Grand Slam level, and in Davis Cup)
- Career titles: 3 ITF
- Highest ranking: No. 562 (10 October 2011)
- Last updated on: 25 September 2024.

Dorian Descloix (born 14 March 1988) is a French tennis coach and former professional player.

Descloix has a career high ATP singles ranking of 666 achieved on 26 July 2010. He also has a career high ATP doubles ranking of 562 achieved on 10 October 2011.

Descloix made his ATP main draw debut at the 2015 Open Sud de France in the doubles draw partnering Gaël Monfils. Descloix officially retired as a player in November 2020.

== Coaching career ==
In February 2020, he became the hitting partner and subsequently coach for Victoria Azarenka. Upon his hiring, Azarenka won the title at the Western & Southern Open, her first title since 2016, and reached the final of the US Open, her first Grand Slam final since 2013. He coached her until October 2021.

Descloix became the coach of Olympic gold medallist Monica Puig for the 2022 season to prepare for her comeback to the tour after injury and surgery. He coached Dayana Yastremska in 2023. He coached Anastasia Potapova from June 2024.. He coached Lulu Sun during few weeks in 2025. Since July 2025, he is coaching Gaël Monfils.
