= Li Ting (tennis, born 1991) =

Chinese tennis player

Li Ting 李婷
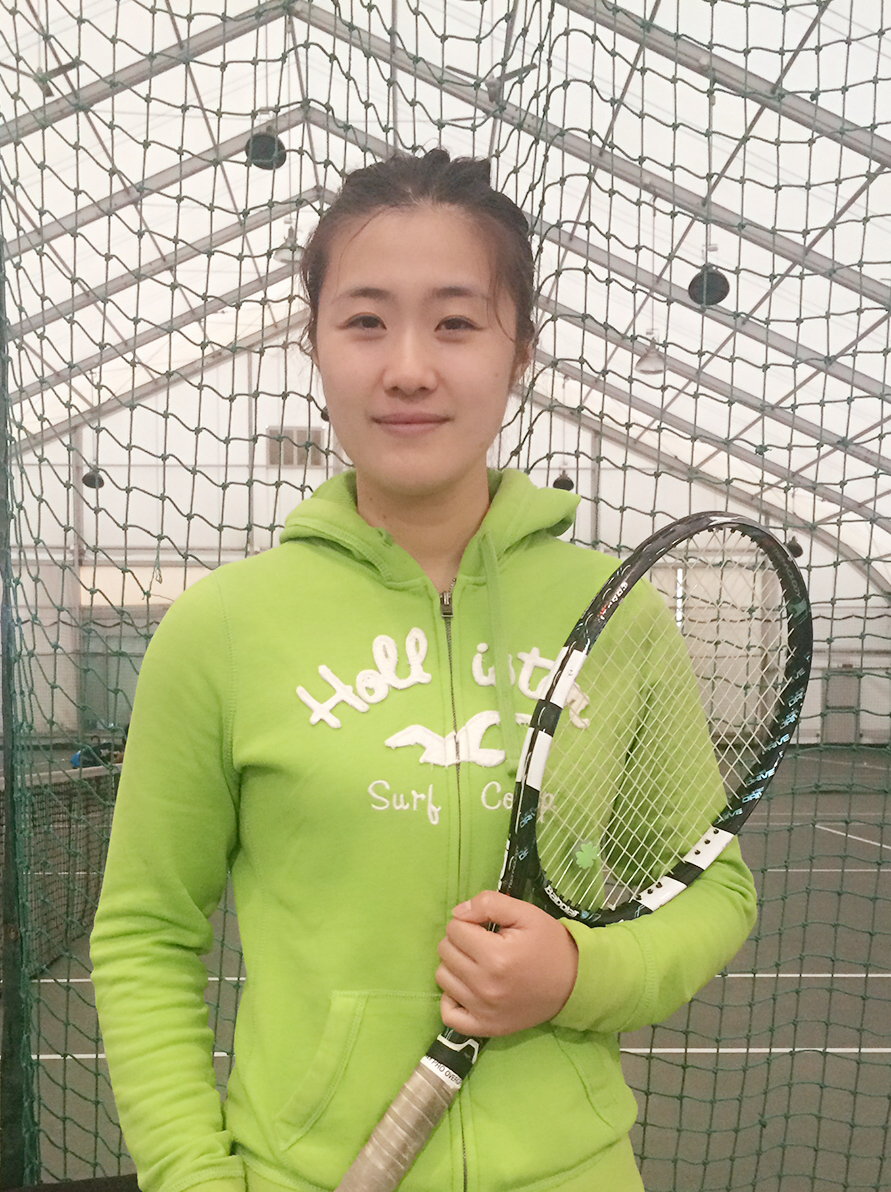
- Country (sports): China
- Born: 15 February 1991 (age 35)
- Turned pro: 2005
- Retired: 2013
- Plays: Right-handed (two-handed backhand)
- Prize money: $31,591

Singles
- Career record: 71 - 76
- Highest ranking: 528 (13 June 2011)

Doubles
- Career record: 69 - 54
- Career titles: 0 WTA, 7 ITF
- Highest ranking: 239 (17 October 2011)

Li Ting (Chinese: 李婷; pinyin: Lǐ Tíng; born 15 February 1991) is a Chinese former female tennis player.

Li has won seven doubles titles on the ITF circuit in her career. On 13 June 2011, she reached her best singles ranking of world number 528. On 17 October 2011, she peaked at world number 239 in the doubles rankings. Li made her WTA tour debut at the 2009 Guangzhou International Women's Open. Li retirement from professional tennis 2013.

== Career ITF finals ==
=== Singles (0–1) ===
$100,000 tournaments
$75,000 tournaments
$50,000 tournaments
$25,000 tournaments
$15,000 tournaments
$10,000 tournaments

Result	No.	Date	Tournament	Surface	Opponent	Score
Loss	1.	20 May 2013	Tarakan, Indonesia	Hard (i)	(Serbia) Jovana Jakšić	3–6, 2–6

=== Doubles (7–0) ===
Result	No.	Date	Tournament	Surface	Partner	Opponents	Score
Win	1.	16 March 2008	Pingguo, China	Hard	(China) Zhou Yimiao	(Japan) Natsumi Hamamura (Japan) Remi Tezuka	6–1, 4–6, [10–8]
Win	2.	21 February 2011	Mumbai, India	Hard	(Japan) Kanae Hisami	(South Korea) Han Sung-hee (Thailand) Varatchaya Wongteanchai	6–1, 7–5
Win	3.	30 April 2011	Bangkok, Thailand	Hard	(Japan) Ai Yamamoto	(Thailand) Napatsakorn Sankaew (China) Yang Zi	7–6^{(8–6)}, 6–4
Win	4.	9 May 2011	Bangkok, Thailand	Hard	(China) Zhao Yijing	(Indonesia) Ayu-Fani Damayanti (Indonesia) Lavinia Tananta	6–7^{(2–7)}, 6–4, 6–4
Win	5.	28 May 2011	Bangkok, Thailand	Hard	(Thailand) Varatchaya Wongteanchai	(Indonesia) Ayu-Fani Damayanti (Indonesia) Lavinia Tananta	6–1, 6–4
Win	6.	3 June 2011	Bangkok, Thailand	Hard	(Thailand) Varatchaya Wongteanchai	(Indonesia) Ayu-Fani Damayanti (Indonesia) Lavinia Tananta	5–7, 7–6^{(7–5)}, [10–5]
Win	7.	9 July 2012	Huzhu, China	Clay	(China) Liang Chen	(China) Li Yihong (China) Tian Ran	7–5, 3–6, [10–6]
