= Mexico at the 2011 Summer Universiade =

- IOC code: MEX

in Shenzhen
- Competitors: 180 in 18 sports
- Medals: Gold 1 Silver 4 Bronze 12 Total 17

Summer Universiade appearances
- 1959; 1961; 1963; 1965; 1967; 1970; 1973; 1975; 1977; 1979; 1981; 1983; 1985; 1987; 1989; 1991; 1993; 1995; 1997; 1999; 2001; 2003; 2005; 2007; 2009; 2011; 2013; 2015; 2017; 2019; 2021; 2025; 2027

Mexico competed at the 2011 Summer Universiade in Shenzhen, China.

== Medalists ==
Medal	Name	Sport	Event	Date
Gold	Paola Espinosa	Diving	10m Platform	18 August
Silver	Rommel Pacheco; Jonathan Ruvalcaba	Diving	Synchronized 3m	16 August
Silver	Julián Sánchez	Diving	3m Springboard	17 August
Silver	Gerardo Alvarado; Angel Ramirez; Cuauhtemoc Alfredo Rodríguez	Archery	Compound Team	18 August
Silver	Paola Espinosa; Tatiana Ortiz	Diving	10m Synchro	19 August
Bronze	Monica Patricia Dominguez Lara	Weightlifting	58 Kg	15 August
Bronze	Ollin Medina	Taekwondo	Poomsae	18 August
Bronze	Ollin Medina; Gerardo García	Taekwondo	Mixed Team Poomsae	19 August
Bronze	Idulio Islas	Taekwondo	-68 Kg	20 August
Bronze	Itzel Manjarrez	Taekwondo	-46 Kg	20 August
Bronze	Mauricio Azcué; Rodolfo Cazaubón; Carlos Ortiz; Gerardo Ruiz	Golf	Men's Team	20 August
Bronze	Valeria Pulido; Leticia Nazari Urbina	Tennis	Women's Doubles	20 August
Bronze	Paola Espinosa	Diving	3m Springboard	20 August
Bronze	Rommel Pacheco	Diving	10m Platform	21 August
Bronze	Rommel Pacheco; Jonathan Ruvalcaba	Diving	Synchronized 10m	22 August
Bronze	Fernando Salvador Corral	Taekwondo	-74 Kg	22 August
Bronze	Alfonso Victoria Espinosa	Taekwondo	-63 Kg	23 August

== Basketball ==
Mexico has qualified a men's team.

== Diving ==
'Men

Athlete	Event	Preliminary		Semifinal		Final	
Athlete	Event	Points	Rank	Points	Rank	Points	Rank
Jahir Ocampo	Men's 1m Springboard	371.40	9 Q	360.00	4	did not advance	
Julián Sánchez	Men's 1m Springboard	403.30	4 Q	434.30	1 Q	433.10	5
Jahir Ocampo	Men's 3m Springboard	344.40	23	did not advance			
Julián Sánchez	Men's 3m Springboard	476.7	2 Q	446.10	5 Q	515.50	2nd place, silver medalist(s)
Rommel Pacheco	Men's 10m Platform	427.35	7 Q	458.45	7 Q	492.05	3rd place, bronze medalist(s)
Jonathan Ruvalcaba	Men's 10m Platform	327.85	14 Q	420.70	10 Q	437.05	7
Rommel Pacheco; Jonathan Ruvalcaba	Men's 3m Synchro Springboard					385.32	2nd place, silver medalist(s)
Rommel Pacheco; Jonathan Ruvalcaba	Men's 10m Synchro Platform					421.50	3rd place, bronze medalist(s)
Rommel Pacheco; Jonathan Ruvalcaba; Jahir Ocampo; Julián Sánchez	Men's Team					3202.82	4

Women

Athlete	Event	Preliminary		Semifinal		Final	
Athlete	Event	Points	Rank	Points	Rank	Points	Rank
Arantxa Chávez	Women's 1m Springboard	DNS					
Tatiana Ortiz	Women's 1m Springboard	250.40	9 Q	251.80	4	did not advance	
Paola Espinosa	Women's 3m Springboard	280.10	10Q	329.70	4 Q	323.60	3rd place, bronze medalist(s)
Arantxa Chávez	Women's 3m Springboard	214.75	20 Q	285.20	9 Q	274.80	9
Paola Espinosa	Women's 10m Platform	347.60	1 Q	366.60	1 Q	385.25	1st place, gold medalist(s)
Tatiana Ortiz	Women's 10m Platform	328.20	4 Q	346.95	3 Q	312.80	8
Paola Espinosa; Arantxa Chávez	Women's 3m Synchro Springboard					284.10	4
Paola Espinosa; Tatiana Ortiz	Women's 10m Synchro Platform					330.48	2nd place, silver medalist(s)
Paola Espinosa; Arantxa Chávez; Tatiana Ortiz	Women's Team					2035.63	6

== Football ==
Mexico has qualified a women's team.

== Volleyball ==
Mexico has qualified a men's team.

== Water polo ==
Mexico has qualified a women's team.
