= Katarína Kachlíková =

Slovak tennis player

- Country (sports): Slovakia
- Born: 2 June 1985 (age 39); Žilina, Czechoslovakia
- Retired: 2011
- Prize money: $89,571

Singles
- Career record: 141–135
- Career titles: 1 ITF
- Highest ranking: No. 217 (19 September 2005)

Grand Slam singles results
- US Open: Q2 (2005)

Doubles
- Career record: 106–101
- Career titles: 3 ITF
- Highest ranking: No. 162 (25 July 2005)
Medal record
Tennis
Representing Slovakia
Summer Universiade
Bronze medal – third place	2009 Belgrade	Singles
Bronze medal – third place	2009 Belgrade	Doubles
Bronze medal – third place	2009 Belgrade	Team

Katarína Kachlíková (born 2 June 1985) is a retired Slovak tennis player.

She took part in the 2006 Bangalore Open and qualified but lost in the first round to Isha Lakhani. She won three doubles titles and one singles title on the ITF Women's Circuit. She played on the WTA Tour and also took part in the 2009 Summer Universiade. Kachlíková retired from professional tennis 2011.

== ITF Circuit finals ==
$100,000 tournaments
$75,000 tournaments
$50,000 tournaments
$25,000 tournaments
$10,000 tournaments

=== Singles (1–1) ===
Outcome	No.	Date	Tournament	Surface	Opponent	Score
Runner-up	1.	13 September 2004	Tbilisi, Georgia	Clay	(Ukraine) Olga Lazarchuk	2–6, 2–6
Winner	1.	21 May 2006	Ho Chi Minh City, Vietnam	Hard	(Japan) Junri Namigata	6–4, 6–4

=== Doubles (3–9) ===
Outcome	No.	Date	Tournament	Surface	Partner	Opponents	Score
Runner-up	1.	30 April 2001	Nitra, Slovakia	Clay	(Slovakia) Kristína Michalaková	(Czech Republic) Petra Kučová (Czech Republic) Gabriela Chmelinová	4–6, 0–6
Runner-up	2.	30 September 2002	Široki Brijeg, Bosnia Herzegovina	Clay	(Bosnia and Herzegovina) Mervana Jugić-Salkić	(Czech Republic) Lenka Snajdrová (Netherlands) Kika Hogendoorn	2–6, 6–4, 4–6
Winner	1.	5 October 2003	Carcavelos, Portugal	Clay	(Czech Republic) Iveta Gerlová	(Colombia) Romy Farah (Hungary) Ágnes Szávay	6–4, 7–6
Runner-up	3.	25 October 2004	Minsk, Belarus	Carpet	(Russia) Irina Bulykina	(Belarus) Darya Kustova (Belarus) Anastasiya Yakimova	4–6, 0–6
Runner-up	4.	24 May 2005	Campobasso, Italy	Clay	(Slovakia) Lenka Tvarošková	(Italy) Giulia Casoni (Morocco) Bahia Mouhtassine	0–6, 5–7
Winner	2.	20 June 2005	Périgueux, France	Clay	(Slovakia) Lenka Tvarošková	(Uzbekistan) Akgul Amanmuradova (Germany) Antonia Matic	7–5, 6–1
Runner-up	5.	31 January 2007	London, England	Hard (i)	(Czech Republic) Andrea Hlaváčková	(United Kingdom) Claire Curran (United Kingdom) Anne Keothavong	6–4, 4–6, 2–6
Runner-up	6.	14 February 2007	Prague, Czech Republic	Hard (i)	(Slovakia) Lenka Tvarošková	(Czech Republic) Petra Cetkovská (Czech Republic) Veronika Chvojková	2–6, 3–6
Runner-up	7.	20 April 2007	Bari, Italy	Clay	(Australia) Sophie Ferguson	(Ukraine) Veronika Kapshay (Ukraine) Mariya Koryttseva	5–7, 2–6
Runner-up	8.	29 April 2007	Cagnes-sur-Mer, France	Clay	(Russia) Anastasia Pavlyuchenkova	(France) Aurélie Védy (Switzerland) Timea Bacsinszky	5–7, 5–7
Runner-up	9.	31 August 2009	Maribor, Slovenia	Clay	(Croatia) Maria Abramović	(Croatia) Ani Mijacika (Croatia) Ana Vrljić	2–6, 3–6
Winner	3.	14 June 2010	Bratislava, Slovakia	Clay	(Slovakia) Lenka Tvarošková	(Canada) Gabriela Dabrowski (Slovakia) Chantal Škamlová	6–4, 7–6
