= Valeria Pulido =

Mexican tennis player (born 1990)

- Full name: Valeria Pulido Velasco
- Country (sports): Mexico
- Born: 1 January 1990 (age 36) Jojutla, Morelos, Mexico
- Height: 5 ft 9 in (175 cm)
- Plays: Right-handed
- Prize money: $18,871

Singles
- Career titles: 2 ITF
- Highest ranking: No. 418 (26 May 2008)

Doubles
- Career record: 44–25
- Career titles: 5 ITF
- Highest ranking: No. 341 (28 April 2008)

Valeria Pulido Velasco (born 1 January 1990) is a former professional tennis player from Mexico.

== Biography ==
Pulido, who comes from the Mexican state of Morelos, won two singles titles and five doubles titles on the ITF Women's Circuit. She received a wildcard into the doubles event at the 2008 Mexican Open, partnering Melissa Torres Sandoval in her only WTA Tour main-draw appearance.

A right-handed player, Pulido left the tour after the 2008 season to play college tennis in the United States for the USC Trojans.

During her career, she represented Mexico in several international events, including three ties for the Mexico Fed Cup team in 2008, against Colombia, Canada and Paraguay. She won bronze medals for Mexico in the women's doubles at both the 2006 Central American and Caribbean Games and 2011 Summer Universiade. At the 2011 Pan American Games she featured in the singles and doubles competitions, making the quarterfinals of the latter.

== ITF finals ==
$25,000 tournaments
$10,000 tournaments

=== Singles (2–1) ===
Outcome	No.	Date	Tournament	Surface	Opponent	Score
Runner-up	1.	2 October 2005	Morelia, Mexico	Hard	(United States) Katie Ruckert	3–6, 3–6
Winner	1.	10 September 2007	Tampico, Mexico	Hard	(Uruguay) Estefanía Craciún	6–1, 7–6^{(2)}
Winner	2.	6 April 2008	Obregón, Mexico	Hard	(United States) Anne Yelsey	6–2, 6–7^{(3)}, 6–2

=== Doubles (5–3) ===
Outcome	No.	Date	Tournament	Surface	Partner	Opponents	Score
Winner	1.	27 September 2005	Morelia, Mexico	Hard	(Mexico) Daniela Múñoz Gallegos	(Poland) Olga Brózda (United States) Jessica Williams	6–2, 6–0
Runner-up	1.	24 September 2006	Guadalajara, Mexico	Clay	(Romania) Alexandra Dulgheru	(Argentina) Betina Jozami (Mexico) Daniela Múñoz Gallegos	5–7, 4–6
Winner	2.	23 April 2007	Obregón, Mexico	Hard	(Mexico) Daniela Múñoz Gallegos	(Mexico) Lorena Arias (Mexico) Erika Clarke	6–3, 3–6, 6–1
Runner-up	2.	7 May 2007	Mazatlán, Mexico	Hard	(Mexico) Daniela Múñoz Gallegos	(United States) Courtney Nagle (United States) Robin Stephenson	5–7, 4–6
Winner	3.	28 May 2007	Monterrey, Mexico	Hard	(Mexico) Daniela Múñoz Gallegos	(Slovakia) Dominika Diešková (United States) Courtney Nagle	6–3, 0–6, 6–3
Winner	4.	17 September 2007	Chihuahua, Mexico	Clay	(Mexico) Daniela Múñoz Gallegos	(Chile) Melisa Miranda (Ecuador) Hilda Zuleta Cabrera	7–6^{(1)}, 7–5
Runner-up	3.	19 November 2007	Mexico City	Hard	(Mexico) Daniela Múñoz Gallegos	(South Africa) Surina De Beer (Paraguay) Rossana de los Ríos	3–6, 1–6
Winner	5.	10 December 2007	Havana, Cuba	Hard	(Mexico) Daniela Múñoz Gallegos	(Austria) Lisa-Maria Moser (Austria) Nicole Rottmann	6–3, 6–4

== See also ==
- List of people from Morelos
