= Tennis at the 2009 Summer Universiade =

- Date: 3-10 July
- Edition: 14
- Location: SRPC Milan Gale Muškatirović

Champions

Men's singles
- Aleksandar Slović (SRB)

Women's singles
- Ksenia Lykina (RUS)

Men's doubles
- Lee Hsin-han / Yi Chu-Huan (TPE)

Women's doubles
- Vitalia Diatchenko / Ekaterina Makarova (RUS)

Mixed doubles
- Yi Chu-huan / Chuang Chia-jung (TPE)

Men's team
- Russia (RUS)

Women's team
- Thailand (THA)
- Summer Universiade

Tennis events were contested at the 2009 Summer Universiade in Belgrade, Serbia.

== Events ==
Event	Gold	Silver	Bronze
Men's singles	Aleksandar Slović (SRB)	Ivan Sergeyev (UKR)	Artem Smirnov (UKR)
Men's singles	Aleksandar Slović (SRB)	Ivan Sergeyev (UKR)	Evgeny Donskoy (RUS)
Men's doubles	Chinese Taipei (TPE); Lee Hsin-han; Yi Chu-huan	Great Britain (GBR); Dominic Inglot; Max Jones	Spain (ESP); David Estruch; Ignasi Villacampa
Men's doubles	Chinese Taipei (TPE); Lee Hsin-han; Yi Chu-huan	Great Britain (GBR); Dominic Inglot; Max Jones	Serbia (SRB); Boris Čonkić; Aleksandar Grubin
Men's Team	Serbia (SRB); Aleksandar Slović; Saša Stojisavljević; Aleksandar Grubin; Boris Čonkić	Ukraine (UKR); Ivan Sergeyev; Artem Smirnov	Chinese Taipei (TPE); Lee Hsin-han; Yi Chu-huan
Women's singles	Ksenia Lykina (RUS)	Klaudia Jans (POL)	Katarina Kachliková (SVK)
Women's singles	Ksenia Lykina (RUS)	Klaudia Jans (POL)	Nikola Fraňková (CZE)
Women's doubles	Russia (RUS); Vitalia Diatchenko; Ekaterina Makarova	Poland (POL); Klaudia Jans; Alicja Rosolska	Japan (JPN); Shuko Aoyama; Miki Miyamura
Women's doubles	Russia (RUS); Vitalia Diatchenko; Ekaterina Makarova	Poland (POL); Klaudia Jans; Alicja Rosolska	Slovakia (SVK); Martina Babáková; Katarína Kachlíková
Women's Team	Russia (RUS); Vitalia Diatchenko; Ekaterina Makarova; Ksenia Lykina	Poland (POL); Klaudia Jans; Alicja Rosolska	Slovakia (SVK); Martina Babáková; Katarina Kachliková
Mixed doubles	Chinese Taipei (TPE); Yi Chu-huan; Chuang Chia-jung	South Korea (KOR); Kim Hyun; Kim So-Yung	Great Britain (GBR); Dominic Inglot; Sam Murray
Mixed doubles	Chinese Taipei (TPE); Yi Chu-huan; Chuang Chia-jung	South Korea (KOR); Kim Hyun; Kim So-Yung	Mexico (MEX); Luis Diaz Barraga; Melissa Torres Sandoval

== Medal table ==
Rank	Nation	Gold	Silver	Bronze	Total
1	Russia (RUS)	3	0	1	4
2	Chinese Taipei (TPE)	2	0	1	3
2	Serbia (SRB)	2	0	1	3
4	Poland (POL)	0	3	0	3
5	Ukraine (UKR)	0	2	1	3
6	Great Britain (GBR)	0	1	1	2
7	South Korea (KOR)	0	1	0	1
8	Slovakia (SVK)	0	0	3	3
9	Czech Republic (CZE)	0	0	1	1
9	Japan (JPN)	0	0	1	1
9	Mexico (MEX)	0	0	1	1
9	Spain (ESP)	0	0	1	1
Totals (12 entries)		7	7	12	26

== See also ==
- Tennis at the Summer Universiade
