= Ukraine at the 2011 Summer Universiade =

- IOC code: UKR

in Shenzhen 12 — 23 August 2011
- Competitors: 293 in 20 sports
- Medals Ranked 7th: Gold 12 Silver 19 Bronze 14 Total 45

Summer Universiade appearances (overview)
- 1993; 1995; 1997; 1999; 2001; 2003; 2005; 2007; 2009; 2011; 2013; 2015; 2017; 2019; 2021

Ukraine competed at the 2011 Summer Universiade in Shenzhen, China, from 12 to 23 August 2011. 293 athletes formed the Ukrainian. They competed in archery, athletics, basketball, beach volleyball, chess, cycling, diving, fencing, football, gymnastics, judo, shooting, swimming, table tennis, taekwondo, tennis, volleyball, and weightlifting. Ukraine was not represented in badminton, golf, sailing, and water polo.

Ukraine won 45 medals, including 12 gold medals, and ranked 6th.

== Medal summary ==
=== Medal by sports ===
Medals by sport
Sport	1st place, gold medalist(s)	2nd place, silver medalist(s)	3rd place, bronze medalist(s)	Total
Athletics	5	3	1	9
Fencing	3	2	1	6
Artistic gymnastics	1	2	1	4
Cycling	1	2	1	4
Shooting	1	0	3	4
Judo	1	0	1	2
Diving	0	2	1	3
Swimming	0	2	1	3
Weightlifting	0	2	1	3
Archery	0	1	1	2
Rhythmic gymnastics	0	1	1	2
Chess	0	1	0	1
Volleyball	0	1	0	1
Beach volleyball	0	0	1	1
Total	12	19	14	45

=== Medalists ===
Medal	Name	Sport	Event
Gold	Bogdan Bondarenko	Athletics	Men's high jump
Gold	Olha Zavhorodnya	Athletics	Women's 800 metres
Gold	Anna Mishchenko	Athletics	Women's 1500 metres
Gold	Hanna Yaroshchuk	Athletics	Women's 400 metres hurdles
Gold	Hanna Titimets; Nataliya Pohrebnyak; Hrystyna Stuy; Yelizaveta Bryzhina	Athletics	Women's 4 × 100 metres relay
Gold	Lesya Kalytovska	Cycling	Women's points race
Gold	Andriy Yahodka	Fencing	Men's individual sabre
Gold	Dmytro Boiko; Oleh Shturbabin; Andriy Yahodka; Dmytro Pundyk	Fencing	Men's team sabre
Gold	Olha Kharlan	Fencing	Women's individual sabre
Gold	Mykola Kuksenkov	Gymnastics	Men's individual all-around
Gold	Viktoriia Turks	Judo	Women's half-heavyweight (—78 kg)
Gold	Kateryna Domkina; Olena Kostevych; Inna Kryachko	Shooting	Women's 25 metre pistol team
Silver	Illya Kvasha; Oleksiy Pryhorov; Oleksandr Bondar; Kostyantyn Milyayev; Dmytro Mezhenskyi	Diving	Men's team
Silver	Olena Fedorova; Hanna Pysmenska	Diving	Women's synchronized 3 metre platform
Silver	Tetyana Dorokhova; Olena Kushniruk; Nina Mylchenko	Archery	Women's recurve team
Silver	Viktor Kuznyetsov	Athletics	Men's triple jump
Silver	Roman Avramenko	Athletics	Men's javelin throw
Silver	Hrystyna Stuy	Athletics	Women's 100 metres
Silver	Martyn Kravtsiv; Iurii Vovk; Olha Kalinina	Chess	Mixed team
Silver	Lesya Kalytovska	Cycling	Women's individual pursuit
Silver	Lyubov Shulika	Cycling	Women's 500 m time trial
Silver	Olena Kryvytska	Fencing	Women's individual épée
Silver	Alina Komashchuk; Olena Khomrova; Olha Kharlan; Halyna Pundyk	Fencing	Women's team sabre
Silver	Mykola Kuksenkov	Gymnastics	Men's horizontal bar
Silver	Yana Demyanchuk; Maryna Kostiuchenko; Angelina Kysla; Anastasia Koval; Valentina Holenkova	Gymnastics	Women's team all-around
Silver	Alina Maksymenko	Gymnastics	Women's rhythmic gymnastics individual hoop
Silver	Darya Stepanyuk	Swimming	Women's 50 m freestyle
Silver	Darya Stepanyuk	Swimming	Women's 100 m freestyle
Silver	Ukraine men's national volleyball team: Pylyp Harmash; Dmytro Shavrak; Oleksiy Klymar; Volodymyr Kovalchuk; Oleksandr Zhumatii; Ruslan Yushkevych; Andriy Savin; Viktor Shchekaliuk; Andrii Tupchii; Andriy Levchenko; Dmytro Babkov; Ruslan Shevtsov	Volleyball	Men's
Silver	Mykola Hordiychuk	Weightlifting	Men's 105 kg
Silver	Oleg Proshak	Weightlifting	Men's +105 kg
Bronze	Illya Kvasha	Diving	Men's 1 metre springboard
Bronze	Dmytro Hrachov; Nina Mylchenko	Archery	Mixed recurve team
Bronze	Liliya Lobanova	Athletics	Women's 800 metres
Bronze	Sergiy Popov; Valeriy Samoday	Beach volleyball	Men's tournament
Bronze	Svitlana Halyuk	Cycling	Women's individual pursuit
Bronze	Anatoliy Herey	Fencing	Men's individual épée
Bronze	Angelina Kysla	Gymnastics	Women's uneven bars
Bronze	Alina Maksymenko	Gymnastics	Women's rhythmic gymnastics individual clubs
Bronze	Andrii Burdin; Anatolii Laskuta; Quedjau Nhabali; Ivan Iefanov; Vitalii Popovych; Razmik Tonoyan; Oleksandr Sizov	Judo	Men's team event
Bronze	Olena Kostevych	Shooting	Women's 10 metre air pistol
Bronze	Olena Kostevych	Shooting	Women's 25 metre pistol
Bronze	Yuliya Korostylova; Olena Kostevych; Inna Kryachko	Shooting	Women's 10 metre air pistol team
Bronze	Serhiy Frolov	Swimming	Men's 1500 m freestyle
Bronze	Daryna Goncharova	Weightlifting	Women's +75 kg

== See also ==
- Ukraine at the 2011 Winter Universiade
