= Mongolia at the 2011 Summer Universiade =

- IOC code: MGL
- NOC: Mongolian National Olympic Committee
- Website: www.olympic.mn

in Shenzhen
- Competitors: 157 in ? sports
- Medals: Gold 0 Silver 1 Bronze 0 Total 1

Summer Universiade appearances
- 1959; 1961; 1963; 1965; 1967; 1970; 1973; 1975; 1977; 1979; 1981; 1983; 1985; 1987; 1989; 1991; 1993; 1995; 1997; 1999; 2001; 2003; 2005; 2007; 2009; 2011; 2013; 2015; 2017; 2019; 2021; 2025; 2027

Mongolia competed at the 2011 Summer Universiade in Shenzhen, China.

== Medalists ==
Medal	Athlete	Sport	Rank	Event
Silver	Otgon Chinbat	Judo	10	Men's 60 kg

== Cycling ==
Road

Men

- Naran Khangarid
- Altanzul Altasnukh
- Tuulkhangai Tuguldur
- Jamsran Ulziibaatar
- Altanzul Maani

Women

- Batbaatar Orkhontuya
- Tserenlkham Solongo
