= United States at the 2011 Summer Universiade =

- IOC code: USA
- NOC: United States Olympic Committee
- Website: www.usateam.org

in Shenzhen
- Competitors: 143+ in 9+ sports
- Flag bearer: Orlando Johnson (opening)
- Medals Ranked 5th: Gold 17 Silver 22 Bronze 12 Total 51

Summer Universiade appearances (overview)
- 1965; 1967; 1970; 1973; 1975; 1977; 1979; 1981; 1983; 1985; 1987; 1989; 1991; 1993; 1995; 1997; 1999; 2001; 2003; 2005; 2007; 2009; 2011; 2013; 2015; 2017; 2019; 2021; 2025; 2027

The United States competed at the 2011 Summer Universiade in Shenzhen, China.

== Medalists ==
Medal	Name	Sport	Event	Date
Gold	Jeshua Anderson	Athletics	Men's 400 metres hurdles	
Gold	Nia Sifaatihii Ali	Athletics	Women's 100 metres hurdles	
Gold	Brigetta Barrett	Athletics	Women's high jump	
Gold	United States women's national basketball team: Elena Delle Donne; Skylar Diggins; Jacki Gemelos; Keisha Hampton; Glory Johnson; Lynetta Kizer; Natalie Novosel; Chiney Ogwumike; Nneka Ogwumike; Devereaux Peters; Odyssey Sims; Shekinna Stricklen	Basketball	Women's tournament	21 August
Gold	Colin Smith; Frederick Strammer; Elizabeth Barry	Sailing	Team Laser Radial class	20 August
Gold	Jimmy Feigen	Swimming	Men's 100 metre freestyle	16 August
Gold	Matt McLean	Swimming	Men's 200 metre freestyle	
Gold	Michael Klueh	Swimming	Men's 800 metre freestyle	15 August
Gold	Tim Phillips	Swimming	Men's 50 metre butterfly	15 August
Gold	Tim Phillips	Swimming	Men's 100 metre butterfly	17 August
Gold	Jimmy Feigen; Tim Phillips; Kolton Norys; Robert Savulich; Tom Shields (heat)	Swimming	Men's 4x100 metre freestyle relay	15 August
Gold	Michael Klueh; Matt Bartlett; Matt McLean; Tom Shields; Daxon Hill (heat)	Swimming	Men's 4x200 metre freestyle relay	16 August
Gold	Haley Anderson	Swimming	Women's 1500 metre freestyle	
Gold	Jennifer Connolly	Swimming	Women's 50 metre backstroke	
Gold	Annie Chandler	Swimming	Women's 50 metre breaststroke	17 August
Gold	Madeline Dirado	Swimming	Women's 400 metre individual medley	16 August
Gold	Kate Dwelley; Karlee Bispo; Chelsea Nauta; Megan Romano; Alyssa Anderson (heat); Shannon Vreeland (heat); Stephanie Peacock (swimmer) (heat)	Swimming	Women's 4x200 metre freestyle relay	17 August
Silver	Kendal Nicely	Archery	Women's compound individual	16 August
Silver	Kendal Nicely; Zachary Plannick	Archery	Men's compound team	18 August
Silver	Marquise Goodwin	Athletics	Men's long jump	
Silver	Tiffany Townsend	Athletics	Women's 200 metres	20 August
Silver	Lakya Brookins; Shayla Mahan; Christina Manning; Tiffany Townsend	Athletics	Women's 4x100 metres relay	
Silver	Heather Hughes; Emily Day	Beach volleyball	Women's tournament	19 August
Silver	Kelci Bryant	Diving	Women's 1 metre springboard	16 August
Silver	Bianca Alvarez; Carrie Dragland	Diving	Women's synchronized 3 metre platform	
Silver	United States	Diving	Women's team	
Silver	Courtney Hurley; Kelley Hurley; Susannah Scanlan; Holly Buechel	Fencing	Women's team épée	16 August
Silver	Perry Emsiek; Scott Furnary; Zeke Horowitz; Alyssa Aitken	Sailing	Team 470 class	20 August
Silver	Adam Small	Swimming	Men's 50 metre freestyle	19 August
Silver	Michael Klueh	Swimming	Men's 400 metre freestyle	17 August
Silver	Rexford Tullius	Swimming	Men's 200 metre backstroke	14 August
Silver	Tom Shields	Swimming	Men's 100 metre butterfly	17 August
Silver	Robert Bollier	Swimming	Men's 200 metre butterfly	14 August
Silver	Rexford Tullius; George Klein; Tim Phillips; Jimmy Feigen	Swimming	Men's 4x100 medley relay	19 August
Silver	Haley Anderson	Swimming	Women's 800 metre freestyle	14 August
Silver	Jennifer Connolly	Swimming	Women's 100 metre backstroke	
Silver	Andrea Kropp	Swimming	Women's 200 metre breaststroke	16 August
Silver	Kate Dwelley; Felicia Lee; Shannon Vreeland; Megan Romano	Swimming	Women's 4x100 metre freestyle relay	14 August
Silver	Jennifer Connolly; Annie Chandler; Lyndsay DePaul; Megan Romano	Swimming	Women's 4x100 metre medley relay	
Silver	United States women's national water polo team: Kimberly Benedetti; Caroline Clark; Nadia Dan; Forel Davies; Alyssa Lo; Pallavi Menon; Amber Oland; Julia Oreglia; Grace Reynolds; Leah Robertson; Stephanie Schnugg; Adrianna Vogt; Cassie Wyckoff	Water polo	Women's tournament	22 August
Bronze	Adam Gallant; Zachary Plannick; Adam Wruck	Archery	Mixed compound team	18 August
Bronze	Ronald Brookins	Athletics	Men's 110 metres hurdles	20 August
Bronze	Mason Finley	Athletics	Men's shot put	16 August
Bronze	Christina Manning	Athletics	Women's 100 metres hurdles	
Bronze	Brooke Beeler; Catherine O'Donnell; Caroline Powers	Golf	Women's team	20 August
Bronze	William Harris	Swimming	Women's 400 metre individual medley	
Bronze	Megan Romano	Swimming	Women's 100 metre freestyle	15 August
Bronze	Karlee Bispo	Swimming	Women's 200 metre freestyle	16 August
Bronze	Stephanie Peacock	Swimming	Women's 400 metre freestyle	15 August
Bronze	Aziza Chambers	Taekwondo	Women's 53 kg	23 August

== Archery ==
The United States was represented by men's and women's athletes in the archery competition.

=== Men ===
Compound

Athlete	Events	Ranking Round		Round of 64	Round of 32	Round of 16	Quarterfinals	Semifinals	Final	
Athlete	Events	Score	Rank	Opposition Score	Opposition Score	Opposition Score	Opposition Score	Opposition Score	Opposition Score	Rank
Adam Wruck	Individual	671	28		Rousseau (CAN) (5); W 144 T10–144 T9	Marx (RSA) (25); W 143–130	Dambaev (RUS) (20); L 140–144	did not advance		
Adam Gallant	Individual	690	7		Ramirez (MEX) (26); W 141–139	Karimi (IRI) (10); W 145–143	Capovilla (ITA) (15); L 141–143	did not advance		
Zachary Plannick	Individual	701	2		Singh (IND) (34); W 144–138	Capovilla (ITA) (15); L 137–143	did not advance			

=== Women ===
Compound

Athlete	Events	Ranking Round		Round of 64	Round of 32	Round of 16	Quarterfinals	Semifinals	Final	
Athlete	Events	Score	Rank	Opposition Score	Opposition Score	Opposition Score	Opposition Score	Opposition Score	Opposition Score	Rank
Elissa Falconer	Individual	658	29	Nikravesh (IRI) (36); W 137–126	Kim (KOR) (4); W 140–138	Abdul Latip (MAS) (20); L 138 T8–138 T10	did not advance			
Tristan Skarvan	Individual	669	19		Seok (KOR) (14); W 142–141	Seo (KOR) (3); L 137–139	did not advance			
Kendal Nicely	Individual	674	10		Blonskaya (KAZ) (23); W 140–135	Parsamehr (IRI) (7); W 145–140	Dessoy (BEL) (31); W 137–136	Seo (KOR) (3); W 141–135	Nikitina (RUS) (24); L 140 T9–140 T10	2nd place, silver medalist(s)

== Basketball ==
The United States has qualified both a men's and a women's team. The official rosters were announced on August 8.

=== Men ===
The men's team participated in Group D, showing much promise after running through the round-robin with an undefeated record. However, they dropped a close game to Lithuania in the quarterfinals, sending them to the 5th-8th classification bracket. They defeated Germany to secure 5th place.

==== Team roster ====
The men's team roster is as follows:

United States Men's World University Games Team roster
Players
Coaches

Pos.	No.	Name	Age – Date of birth	Height	Club	Ctr.
F/C		Tim Abromaitis	21 – September 17, 1989	6 ft 8 in (2.03 m)	Notre Dame University	(United States)
G		Marcus Denmon	21 – March 20, 1990	6 ft 3 in (1.91 m)	Missouri	(United States)
G		Ashton Gibbs	21 – January 19, 1990	6 ft 2 in (1.88 m)	University of Pittsburgh	(United States)
F		Draymond Green	21 – March 4, 1990	6 ft 7 in (2.01 m)	Michigan State University	(United States)
F		JaMychal Green	21 – June 21, 1990	6 ft 8 in (2.03 m)	University of Alabama	(United States)
G		Scoop Jardine	23 – August 9, 1988	6 ft 2 in (1.88 m)	Syracuse University	(United States)
G		John Jenkins	20 – March 6, 1991	6 ft 4 in (1.93 m)	Vanderbilt University	(United States)
G		Orlando Johnson	22 – March 11, 1989	6 ft 5 in (1.96 m)	UC Santa Barbara	(United States)
F		Greg Mangano	21 – October 28, 1989	6 ft 10 in (2.08 m)	Yale University	(United States)
F/C		Trevor Mbakwe	22 – January 24, 1989	6 ft 8 in (2.03 m)	Minnesota	(United States)
G		Ray McCallum Jr.	20 – June 12, 1991	6 ft 1 in (1.85 m)	University of Detroit Mercy	(United States)
G		Darius Miller	21 – March 21, 1990	6 ft 6 in (1.98 m)	Kentucky	(United States)

Head coach

- (United States) Matt Painter (Purdue University)

Assistant coach(es)

- (United States) Cuonzo Martin (University of Tennessee)
- (United States) Brad Stevens (Butler University)

Team Physician

- (United States) Brock Schnebel (University of Oklahoma)

Athletic Trainer

- (United States) Ed Thompson (Southern Illinois University)

Legend

- (C) Team captain
- nat field describes country of university
- Age field is age on August 13, 2011

==== Preliminary round ====
Team	Pld	W	L	PF	PA	PD	Pts.
United States	5	5	0	540	336	+204	10
Mexico	5	3	2	399	423	−24	8
Finland	5	3	2	358	389	−31	8
Israel	5	2	3	367	385	−18	7
South Korea	5	2	3	415	450	−35	7
Hungary	5	0	5	314	410	−96	5

August 13, 2011
18:00

Report

United States	108–67	Mexico
Scoring by quarter: 22-24, 21-13, 31-16, 34-14
Pts: Gibbs 20; Rebs: Mbakwe 10; Asts: Gibbs, Jenkins, Johnson 3		Pts: Giron 13; Rebs: Delgado 6 Asts: Martin del Campo, Cheda, Cruz 2

Main Gymnasium of Universiade Center, Shenzhen
Referees: Scott Paul Beker (AUS)

August 14, 2011
15:30

Report

Hungary	53–102	United States
Scoring by quarter: 6-21, 13-37, 6-26, 28-18
Pts: Morgen 13; Rebs: Morgen 9 Asts: Kovacs 3		Pts: Jenkins 20; Rebs: Mbakwe 9 Asts: Gibbs 4

Main Gymnasium of Universiade Center, Shenzhen
Referees: Carlos Mateus (FRA)

August 15, 2011
15:30

Report

United States	112–68	South Korea
Scoring by quarter: 24-19, 31-23, 26-12, 31-14
Pts: J Green 17; Rebs: D Green 12; Asts: Gibbs 4		Pts: Kim MG 12; Rebs: Kim MG 8 Asts: Cha BW 3

Main Gymnasium of Universiade Center, Shenzhen
Referees: Jacob Cassimiro Barreto (Brazil)

August 17, 2011
18:00

Report

Finland	64–124	United States
Scoring by quarter: 19-31, 19-32, 13-37, 13-24
Pts: Kanervo 20; Rebs: Heinonen, Lindbom 4 Asts: Pounds, Kanervo, Nikkarinen 2		Pts: J Green 21; Rebs: D Green 9 Asts: four players 3

Main Gymnasium of Universiade Center, Shenzhen
Referees: Chris Dodds (Scotland)

August 18, 2011
15:30

Report

United States	94–84	Israel
Scoring by quarter: 27-23, 14-20, 29-19, 24-22
Pts: J Green 16; Rebs: Mbakwe 13; Asts: Johnson, D Green 2		Pts: Shoutvin 20; Rebs: Shoutvin 8 Asts: Bet Yosef 3

Main Gymnasium of Universiade Center, Shenzhen
Referees: Jurgis Lauranovicius (Lithuania)

==== Quarterfinals ====
August 20, 2011
18:00

Report

United States	74–76	Lithuania
Scoring by quarter: 15–12, 27–25, 19–28, 13–11
Pts: Jenkins 17; Rebs: Mbakwe 10; Asts: Denmon, Jardine 3		Pts: Orelik 19; Rebs: Kadzevicius, Orelik 6 Asts: Stanionis 5

Main Gymnasium of Universiade Center, Shenzhen
Referees: Scott Paul Beker (Australia)

==== Classification 5th-8th place ====
August 21, 2011
20:30

Report

Romania	73–94	United States
Scoring by quarter: 12–20, 17–27, 26–27, 18–20
Pts: Nicoara 22; Rebs: Moldoveanu 11; Asts: Moldoveanu, Nicoara 3		Pts: D Green 16; Rebs: Abromaitis, J Green, Mbakwe 8 Asts: D Green 4

Shenzhen Luohu Gymnasium, Shenzhen
Referees: Mindaugas Vecerskis (Lithuania)

==== 5th place match ====
August 22, 2011
18:00

Report

Germany	83–86	United States
Scoring by quarter: 21–19, 20–21, 20–24, 22–22
Pts: Lischka 28; Rebs: Seiferth 6 Asts: Doreth, Tadda, Lischka 3		Pts: Mbakwe 21; Rebs: Mbakwe 8 Asts: Gibbs, D Green 3

Shenzhen Luohu Gymnasium, Shenzhen
Referees: Marius Udrica (Romania)

=== Women ===
The women's team participated in Group B and won with 40+ point leads in the round robin. They finished in first place after defeating Chinese Taipei in the final, winning the gold medal.

==== Team roster ====
The women's team roster is as follows:

United States Women's World University Games Team roster
Players
Coaches

Pos.	No.	Name	Age – Date of birth	Height	Club	Ctr.
G/F		Elena Delle Donne	21 – September 5, 1989	6 ft 5 in (1.96 m)	Delaware	(United States)
G		Skylar Diggins	21 – August 2, 1990	5 ft 10 in (1.78 m)	Notre Dame University	(United States)
G		Jacki Gemelos	22 – November 22, 1988	6 ft 0 in (1.83 m)	USC	(United States)
F		Keisha Hampton	21 – February 22, 1990	6 ft 2 in (1.88 m)	DePaul University	(United States)
F		Glory Johnson	21 – July 27, 1990	6 ft 3 in (1.91 m)	Tennessee	(United States)
C		Lynetta Kizer	21 – April 4, 1990	6 ft 4 in (1.93 m)	Maryland	(United States)
G		Natalie Novosel	21 – November 22, 1989	5 ft 11 in (1.8 m)	Notre Dame University	(United States)
F		Chiney Ogwumike	19 – March 21, 1992	6 ft 3 in (1.91 m)	Stanford University	(United States)
F		Nneka Ogwumike	21 – July 2, 1990	6 ft 2 in (1.88 m)	Stanford University	(United States)
F		Devereaux Peters	21 – October 8, 1989	6 ft 2 in (1.88 m)	Notre Dame University	(United States)
G		Odyssey Sims	19 – July 13, 1992	5 ft 8 in (1.73 m)	Baylor University	(United States)
G/F		Shekinna Stricklen	21 – July 30, 1990	6 ft 2 in (1.88 m)	Tennessee	(United States)

Head coach

- (United States) Bill Fennelly (Iowa State University)

Assistant coach(es)

- (United States) Suzie McConnel-Serio (Duquesne University)
- (United States) Terri Williams-Flournoy (Georgetown University)

Team Physician

- (United States) Brock Schnebel (University of Oklahoma)

Athletic Trainer

- (United States) Shannon Becker (University of Georgia)

Legend

- (C) Team captain
- nat field describes country of university
- Age field is age on August 13, 2011

==== Preliminary round ====
Team	Pld	W	L	PF	PA	PD	Pts.
United States	3	3	0	311	154	+157	6
Brazil	3	2	1	186	211	-25	5
Great Britain	3	1	2	152	204	-52	4
Slovakia	3	0	3	163	243	-80	3

August 14, 2011
10:00

Report

United States	112–53	Brazil
Scoring by quarter: 25–6, 31–11, 28–23, 27–13
Pts: Delle Donne 17; Rebs: Peters, Johnson 9 Asts: Diggins 5		Pts: Colhado 16; Rebs: Colhado 12; Asts: Santos, Paixao, Zabani 2

Main Gymnasium of Universiade Center, Shenzhen
Referees: Nadine Renée Crowley (CAN)

August 15, 2011
10:00

Report

Slovakia	68–114	United States
Scoring by quarter: 20–30, 14–30, 19–25, 15–29
Pts: Felixová 13; Rebs: Felixová 4 Asts: seven players 1		Pts: Diggins, Peters, Ogwumike 14; Rebs: Delle Donne 10; Asts: Sims 5

Main Gymnasium of Universiade Center, Shenzhen
Referees: Serkan Emlek (TUR)

August 16, 2011
18:00

Report

United States	85–33	Great Britain
Scoring by quarter: 23–11, 30–6, 14–7, 18–9
Pts: Diggins 13; Rebs: Johnson 8 Asts: Diggins 4		Pts: Oyefuwa 9 Rebs: Oyefuwa 8 Asts: Anderson 2

Main Gymnasium of Universiade Center, Shenzhen
Referees: Jurgis Lauranovicius (LTU)

==== Quarterfinals ====
August 18, 2011
20:30

Report

United States	96–30	Finland
Scoring by quarter: 31–10, 21–7, 20–7, 23–6
Pts: Peters, Delle Donne 17; Rebs: Johnson 9 Asts: Diggins 7		Pts: Vapamaa 6 Rebs: Sten 6 Asts: no assists

Shenzhen Luohu Gymnasium, Shenzhen
Referees: Mindaugas Vecerskis (LTU)

==== Semi-finals ====
August 19, 2011
20:30

Report

United States	79–67	Australia
Scoring by quarter: 20–17, 11–10, 22–19, 26–21
Pts: Delle Donne 21; Rebs: Delle Donne 11; Asts: Diggins 4		Pts: Hunt 18; Rebs: Hunt 3 Asts: Francis 14

Main Gymnasium of Universiade Center, Shenzhen
Referees: Boris Schmidt (GER)

==== Gold medal match ====
August 21, 2011
21:30

Report

Chinese Taipei	66–101	United States (gold)
Scoring by quarter: 21–29, 17–26, 16–20, 12–26
Pts: Chen YC 21; Rebs: Huang PJ 4 Asts: Huang FS 4		Pts: N Ogwumike 24; Rebs: Delle Donne 11; Asts: Diggins 6

Main Gymnasium of Universiade Center, Shenzhen
Referees: Nadine Renée Crowley (CAN)

== Beach volleyball ==
The United States will be represented by two men's teams and one women's team.

=== Men ===
Athlete	Event	Preliminary round (3)	Elimination rounds						
Athlete	Event	Preliminary round (3)	Round 1	Round 2	Round 3	Quarterfinals	Semifinals	Final	Standing
Athlete	Event	Opposition Score	Opposition Score	Opposition Score	Opposition Score	Opposition Score	Opposition Score	Opposition Score	Standing
Maddison McKibbin; Connor Hughes	Doubles	Alimi – Lacombe (FRA); W 2 – 0 Kvamsdal – Stromsvag (NOR); L 1 – 2 Wong – Kwok (HKG); W 2 – 0	Alvarez – Sandoval (CRC); W 2 – 0	Cecchini – Cionna (ITA); W 2 – 1	Kadziola – Szalankiewicz (POL); L 0 – 2 to consolation round	did not advance			
Jeff Carlson; Tony Ciarelli	Doubles	Allaire – Plantinga (CAN); W 2 – 0 Kittipat – Teerapat (THA); L 0 – 2 Prokopyev – Bogatov (RUS); L 0 – 2	Murakami – Sato (JPN); W 2 – 0	Prokopyev – Bogatov (RUS); W 2 – 1	Rohde – Köhler (GER); W 2 – 0	Kadziola – Szalankiewicz (POL); L 0 – 2 to consolation round	did not advance		

Consolation Round

Athlete	Event	Round 1	Round 2	Round 3	Round 4	Round 5 (to semifinals)	Standing
Athlete	Event	Opposition Score	Opposition Score	Opposition Score	Opposition Score	Opposition Score	Standing
Maddison McKibbin; Connor Hughes	Doubles			Kvamsdal – Stromsvag (NOR); L 0 – 2	did not advance		T7
Jeff Carlson; Tony Ciarelli	Doubles				Prokopyev – Bogatov (RUS); L 0 – 2	Did not advance	T5

=== Women ===
Athlete	Event	Preliminary round (3)	Elimination rounds						
Athlete	Event	Preliminary round (3)	Round 1	Round 2	Round 3	Quarterfinals	Semifinals	Final	Standing
Athlete	Event	Opposition Score	Opposition Score	Opposition Score	Opposition Score	Opposition Score	Opposition Score	Opposition Score	Standing
Geena Urango; Jane Chefeh	Doubles	Grossner – Bieneck (GER); L 0 – 2 Puri – Kerner (EST); L 0 – 2 Radarong – Udomchavee (THA); L 0 – 2	Whitaker – Valjas (CAN); L 1 – 2 to consolation round	did not advance					
Emily Day; Heather Hughes	Doubles	Goricanec – Grässli (SUI); W 2 – 0 Florian – Corral (ESP); W 2 – 1 Kristel – Kertti (EST); W 2 – 0	Senupe – Manzano (PHI); W 2 – 0	Popva – Rastykus (RUS); W 2 – 0	Borger – Buethe (GER); W 2 – 1	Secomana – Bednarczur (BRA); L 0 – 2 to consolation round	Jin – Miao (CHN); W 2 – 0	Borger – Buethe (GER); L 0 – 2	2nd place, silver medalist(s)

Consolation Round

Athlete	Event	Round 1	Round 2	Round 3	Round 4	Round 5 (to semifinals)	Standing
Athlete	Event	Opposition Score	Opposition Score	Opposition Score	Opposition Score	Opposition Score	Standing
Geena Urango; Jane Chefeh	Doubles	Nagata – Ishida (JPN); W 2 – 1	Puri – Kerner (EST); L 0 – 2	did not advance			17
Emily Day; Heather Hughes	Doubles					Nestarcova – Dubocova (SVK); W 2 – 0 to semifinals	

== Swimming ==
The United States sent a men's and women's swimming team of 48 swimmers.

=== Men ===
Event	Athletes	Heat		Final	
Event	Athletes	Time	Position	Time	Position
50 m freestyle	Josh Schneider	22.85	7 Q	22.46	5
50 m freestyle	Adam Small	22.53	2 Q	22.31	2nd place, silver medalist(s)
100 m freestyle	Jimmy Feigen	49.60	2 Q	49.26	1st place, gold medalist(s)
100 m freestyle	Bobby Savulich	49.90	6 Q	49.97	7
200 m freestyle	Matt McLean	1:49.69	3 Q	1:47.44	1st place, gold medalist(s)
200 m freestyle	Tom Shields	1:50.71	T10	did not advance	
400 m freestyle	Michael Klueh	3:54.41	T2 Q	3:48.84	2nd place, silver medalist(s)
400 m freestyle	David Mosko	3:54.41	T2 Q	3:53.89	5
800 m freestyle	Michael Klueh			7:52.31	1st place, gold medalist(s)
800 m freestyle	David Mosko			8:01.77	7
50 m backstroke	Cody Chitwood	26.49	16	did not advance	
50 m backstroke	Rexford Tullius	26.02	T8^{1}	did not advance	
100 m backstroke	Cody Chitwood	55.88	12	did not advance	
100 m backstroke	Rexford Tullius	55.72	11	did not advance	
200 m backstroke	Cody Chitwood	1:59.04	1 Q	1:59.48	4
200 m backstroke	Rexford Tullius	2:00.46	6 Q	1:58.66	2nd place, silver medalist(s)
50 m breaststroke	Clark Burckle	28.51	17	did not advance	
50 m breaststroke	Robert Lovelace	28.72	22	did not advance	
100 m breaststroke	Clark Burckle	1:02.58	17	did not advance	
100 m breaststroke	Robert Lovelace	1:02.52	15	did not advance	
200 m breaststroke	Clark Burckle	2:12.37	3 Q	2:13.56	8
200 m breaststroke	Adam Klein	2:12.71	4 Q	2:13.48	7
50 m butterfly	Tim Phillips	23.76	1 Q	23.51	1st place, gold medalist(s)
50 m butterfly	Tom Shields	24.84	19	did not advance	
100 m butterfly	Tim Phillips	52.15	1 Q	52.06	1st place, gold medalist(s)
100 m butterfly	Tom Shields	52.77	2 Q	52.62	2nd place, silver medalist(s)
200 m butterfly	Robert Bollier	1:57.11	2 Q	1:56.06	2nd place, silver medalist(s)
200 m butterfly	Mark Dylla	1:57.70	4 Q	1:58.00	5
200 m individual medley	Cody Chitwood	2:02.65	7 Q	2:00.53	5
200 m individual medley	Austin Surhoff	2:02.72	8 Q	2:01.04	6
400 m individual medley	William Cregar	4:23.37	6 Q	4:23.31	8
400 m individual medley	William Tyler Harris	4:16.52	1 Q	4:15.40	3rd place, bronze medalist(s)
4 × 100 m freestyle relay	Jimmy Feigen; Kohlton Norys; Robert Savulich; Tim Phillips; Tom Shields (heat)	3:17.68	1 Q	3:15.84	1st place, gold medalist(s)
4 × 200 m freestyle relay	Matt Bartlett; Michael Klueh; Matt McLean; Tom Shields; Daxon Hill (heat)	7:19.02	1 Q	7:13.54	1st place, gold medalist(s)
4 × 100 m medley relay	Rexford Tullius; George Klein; Tim Phillips; Jimmy Feigen; Kohlton Norys (heat); Tom Shields (heat); Robert Savulich (heat)	3:39.36	3 Q	3:37.92	2nd place, silver medalist(s)
10 km marathon	Connor Signorin			2:00:26.64	7
10 km marathon	Ryan Feeley			2:05:02.28	14

^^{1} Tullius was tied for the eighth spot in the final. He lost a swim-off against Jan Philip Glania of Germany, reaching a time of 26.02, 0.22 seconds short of Glania's time.

Coaching staff

Head coach: Rich DeSelm
Assistant coaches: Brette Hawke, Harvey Humphries, Anthony Nesty

=== Women ===
Event	Athletes	Heat		Final	
Event	Athletes	Time	Position	Time	Position
50 m freestyle	Karlee Bispo	25.80	8 Q	25.40	6
50 m freestyle	Samantha Woodward	25.49	5 Q	25.39	5
100 m freestyle	Kate Dwelley	55.55	4 Q	55.61	5
100 m freestyle	Megan Romano	55.50	2 Q	55.38	3rd place, bronze medalist(s)
200 m freestyle	Alyssa Anderson	2:00.72	9	did not advance	
200 m freestyle	Karlee Bispo	1:59.92	4 Q	1:59.31	3rd place, bronze medalist(s)
400 m freestyle	Alyssa Anderson	4:12.34	2 Q	4:10.49	4
400 m freestyle	Stephanie Peacock	4:10.88	1 Q	4:10.25	3rd place, bronze medalist(s)
800 m freestyle	Haley Anderson			8:27.11	2nd place, silver medalist(s)
800 m freestyle	Samantha Vandenberge			8:46.70	8
1500 m freestyle	Haley Anderson			16:21.72	1st place, gold medalist(s)
1500 m freestyle	Samantha Vandenberge			16:49.72	10
50 m backstroke	Jennifer Connolly	28.13 (GR)^{1}	1 Q	27.92 GR	1st place, gold medalist(s)
50 m backstroke	Taylor Wohrley	29.98	17	did not advance	
100 m backstroke	Jennifer Connolly	1:00.40	1 Q	1:00.50	2nd place, silver medalist(s)
100 m backstroke	Taylor Wohrley	1:02.97	19	did not advance	
200 m backstroke	Ashley Jones	2:11.62	4 Q	2:12.19	6
200 m backstroke	Amy Modglin	2:15.51	14	did not advance	
50 m breaststroke	Annie Chandler	31.24	1 Q	31.13	1st place, gold medalist(s)
50 m breaststroke	Micah Lawrence	31.77	3 Q	32.23	7
100 m breaststroke	Annie Chandler	1:09.69	5 Q	1:08.77	5
100 m breaststroke	Micah Lawrence	1:09.06	1 Q	1:08.96	6
200 m breaststroke	Andrea Kropp	2:27.86	3 Q	2:26.18	2nd place, silver medalist(s)
200 m breaststroke	Ashley Wanland	2:27.77	2 Q	2:28.90	7
50 m butterfly	Lyndsay DePaul	27.20	6 Q	26.81	5
50 m butterfly	Felicia Lee	27.43	8 Q	27.06	7
100 m butterfly	Lyndsay DePaul	59.01	1 Q	59.17	4
100 m butterfly	Felicia Lee	59.96	6 Q	1:00.58	8
200 m butterfly	Rachel Naurath	2:13.17	10	did not advance	
200 m butterfly	Andrea Taylor	2:11.88	7 Q	2:12.94	7
200 m individual medley	Madeline Dirado	DSQ	–	did not advance	
200 m individual medley	Elizabeth Smith	2:17.42	12	did not advance	
400 m individual medley	Madeline Dirado	4:45.12	1 Q	4:40.79	1st place, gold medalist(s)
400 m individual medley	Andrea Taylor	4:48.52	5 Q	4:46.40	6
4 × 100 m freestyle relay	Kate Dwelley; Felicia Lee; Megan Romano; Shannon Vreeland	3:41.05	1 Q	3:40.19	2nd place, silver medalist(s)
4 × 200 m freestyle relay	Kate Dwelley; Karlee Bispo; Chelsea Nauta; Megan Romano; Alyssa Anderson (heat); Shannon Vreeland (heat); Stephanie Peacock (heat)	8:01.97	1 Q	7:55.02	1st place, gold medalist(s)
4 × 100 m medley relay	Jennifer Connolly; Annie Chandler; Lyndsay DePaul; Megan Romano; Felicia Lee (heat); Micah Lawrence (heat)	4:06.83	2 Q	4:00.15	2nd place, silver medalist(s)
10 km marathon	Tristin Baxter			2:13:04.68	12
10 km marathon	Damaris Iriondo			2:14:10.96	14

^^{1} Connolly set a Universiade record in the heats, but broke her own record in the final a few hours later.

Coaching staff

Head coach: Eric Hansen
Assistant coaches: Carol Capitani, Rick DeMont, John Hargis

== Table tennis ==
The United States will be represented by a men's and women's team.

=== Men ===
Singles

Athlete	Event	Round Robin		Round of 64	Round of 32	Eighthfinals	Quarterfinals	Semifinals	Final	
Athlete	Event	Match 1	Match 2	Round of 64	Round of 32	Eighthfinals	Quarterfinals	Semifinals	Final	
Athlete	Event	Opposition Result	Opposition Result	Opposition Result	Opposition Result	Opposition Result	Opposition Result	Opposition Result	Opposition Result	Rank
Mark Hazinski	Singles	El Hakim (LIB); W 3–0	Al Kalali (KSA); W 3–0	Paykov (RUS); L 0–4	did not advance					
Chance Friend	Singles	Flemming (GER); L 0–3	Shang (CHN); L 0–3	did not advance						
William Rather	Singles	Pysar (UKR); L 0–3	Donado Lopez (ESA); L 0–3	did not advance						
Zhang Yahao	Singles	Youn (KOR); L 0–3	Garcia Galipienso (ESP); W 3–1	did not advance						
Brian Simcox	Singles	Tran (VIE); L 0–3	Carlier (CHI); L 0–3	did not advance						

Doubles

Athlete	Event	Round of 64	Round of 32	Eighthfinals	Quarterfinals	Semifinals	Final	
Athlete	Event	Opposition Result	Opposition Result	Opposition Result	Opposition Result	Opposition Result	Opposition Result	Rank
Mark Hazinski; Zhang Yahao	Doubles	Bhaja/Harb (LIB); W 3–0	Gregory/Yang (CAN); W 3–1	Lebesson/Mattenet (FRA); L 0–3	did not advance			
Chance Friend; Brian Simcox	Doubles	Carlier/Olea (CHI); L 1–3	did not advance					

Team

Athlete	Event	Round Robin (Group D)		Round of 16	Quarterfinals	Semifinals	Final	
Athlete	Event	Match 1	Match 2	Round of 16	Quarterfinals	Semifinals	Final	
Athlete	Event	Opposition Result	Opposition Result	Opposition Result	Opposition Result	Opposition Result	Opposition Result	Rank
Zhang Yahao; Mark Hazinski; Chance Friend	Team	Japan (JPN); L 0–3	Netherlands (NED); L 1–3	did not advance				

=== Women ===
Singles

Athlete	Event	Round Robin			Round of 64	Round of 32	Eighthfinals	Quarterfinals	Semifinals	Final	
Athlete	Event	Match 1	Match 2	Match 3	Round of 64	Round of 32	Eighthfinals	Quarterfinals	Semifinals	Final	
Athlete	Event	Opposition Result	Opposition Result	Opposition Result	Opposition Result	Opposition Result	Opposition Result	Opposition Result	Opposition Result	Opposition Result	Rank
Judy Hugh	Singles	Jaclan (PHI); W 3–0	Mabikana (CGO); W 3–0		Badosa Cano (ESP); L 3–4	did not advance					
Barbara Wei	Singles	Lok (HKG); L 0–3	Yuen (CAN); L 2–3		did not advance						
Stephanie Shih	Singles	Manico (COK); W 3–0	Chung Sinwing (HKG); L 3–0	Kim So Ri (KOR); L 3–0	did not advance						

Doubles

Athlete	Event	Round of 64	Round of 32	Eighthfinals	Quarterfinals	Semifinals	Final	
Athlete	Event	Opposition Result	Opposition Result	Opposition Result	Opposition Result	Opposition Result	Opposition Result	Rank
Stephanie Shih; Judy Hugh	Doubles	Leong/Wong (MAC); W 3–1	Fujii/Matsuzawa (JPN); L 0–3	did not advance				

Team

Athlete	Event	Round Robin (Group B)			Round of 16	Quarterfinals	Semifinals	Final	
Athlete	Event	Match 1	Match 2	Match 3	Round of 16	Quarterfinals	Semifinals	Final	
Athlete	Event	Opposition Result	Opposition Result	Opposition Result	Opposition Result	Opposition Result	Opposition Result	Opposition Result	Rank
Judy Hugh; Barbara Wei; Stephanie Shih	Team	Russia (RUS); L 0–3	Spain (ESP); L 0–3	Lebanon (LIB); W 3–0	Romania (ROU); L 0–3	did not advance			

== Tennis ==
The United States will be represented by five tennis players, three male and two female.

=== Men ===
Athlete	Event	Round of 64	Round of 32	Round of 16	Quarterfinals	Semifinals	Final	
Athlete	Event	Opposition Score	Opposition Score	Opposition Score	Opposition Score	Opposition Score	Opposition Score	Rank
Phillip Arndt	Singles	Ho (CAN); W 6–3, 6–3	Školoudík (CZE); L 4–6, 7–5, 3–6	did not advance				
Michael Sicora	Singles	Huang (TPE); L 1–6, 3–6	did not advance					
Phillip Ardnt; Gregory Hirshman	Doubles		Poplavskyy (Ukraine) Anikanov (UKR); L 4–6, 6–4, 6–3	did not advance				

Consolation Draw

Athlete	Event	Round of 32	Round of 16	Quarterfinals	Semifinals	Consolation Final	
Athlete	Event	Opposition Score	Opposition Score	Opposition Score	Opposition Score	Opposition Score	Rank
Michael Sicora	Singles	Jain (IND); W 6–0, 6–2	Anikanov (UKR); L 3–6, 2–6	did not advance			

=== Women ===
Athlete	Event	Round of 64	Round of 32	Round of 16	Quarterfinals	Semifinals	Final	
Athlete	Event	Opposition Score	Opposition Score	Opposition Score	Opposition Score	Opposition Score	Opposition Score	Rank
Courtney Collins	Singles	Cornish (GBR); W 7–5, 7–6^{(8–6)}	Tananta (INA); L 2–6, 6–7^{(1–7)}	did not advance				
Krista Damico	Singles	Hladíková (CZE); L 4–6, 4–6	did not advance					
Courtney Collins; Krista Damico	Doubles		Pulido (Mexico) Urbina (MEX); L 6–4, 3–6, 5–7	did not advance				

Consolation Draw

Athlete	Event	Round of 32	Round of 16	Quarterfinals	Semifinals	Consolation Final	
Athlete	Event	Opposition Score	Opposition Score	Opposition Score	Opposition Score	Opposition Score	Rank
Krista Damico	Singles		Honiball (NAM); W 6–1, 6–0	Vatwani (IND); W 6–3, 6–0	Sunic (CRO); L 1–6, 3–6	did not advance	

=== Mixed ===
Athlete	Event	Round of 32	Round of 16	Quarterfinals	Semifinals	Final	
Athlete	Event	Opposition Score	Opposition Score	Opposition Score	Opposition Score	Opposition Score	Rank
Courtney Collins; Michael Sicora	Doubles	Sher (South Africa) Holtzhausen (RSA); W 6–3, 6–3	Poplavskyy (Ukraine) Vasylyeva (UKR); L 3–6, 0–6	did not advance			

== Volleyball ==
The United States qualified a men's team.

=== Men ===
The men's team competed in Group D. They finished in third place after a close loss to the Czech Republic and a loss to Thailand put them right outside of qualifying to the playoffs. After a close loss to Japan, the United States lost the chance to compete for ninth place and settled for thirteenth place.

==== Team ====
The men's indoor volleyball team is as follows:

- Outside hitters
  - Thomas Amberg
  - Tri Bourne
  - Brad Lawson
  - Jeff Menzel
  - Cory Yoder
  - Taylor Hughes (alternate)
- Opposite hitters
  - Carson Clark
  - Murphy Troy
  - Jim Baughman (alternate)
  - Kyle Caldwell (alternate)
  - Rob Stowell (alternate)
- Middle blockers
  - Weston Dunlap
  - Ryan Meehan
  - Matt Pollock (alternate)
  - Matt Rawson (alternate)
- Setters
  - Kawika Shoji
  - Riley McKibbin
- Libero
  - Erik Shoji

Coaches

- Gordon Mayforth – Head Coach
- Pete Hanson – Assistant Coach/Team Leader
- JT Wenger – Assistant Coach
- Larnie Boquiren – Trainer

==== Preliminary round results ====
Pos	Team	Pld	W	L	Pts	SW	SL	SR	SPW	SPL	SPR
1	Czech Republic	5	5	0	10	15	5	3.000	478	416	1.149
2	Thailand	5	4	1	9	13	4	3.250	415	344	1.206
3	United States	5	3	2	8	12	6	2.000	418	367	1.139
4	Mexico	5	2	3	7	6	9	0.667	323	365	0.885
5	Turkey	5	1	4	6	5	13	0.385	356	421	0.846
6	United Arab Emirates	5	0	5	5	1	15	0.067	313	390	0.803

12 August 2011	Mexico	0–3	United States	Shenzhen Gym
12 August 2011	(17–25, 23–25, 15–25)			Shenzhen Gym

13 August 2011	United States	3–0	Turkey	Shenzhen Gym
13 August 2011	(25–18, 25–9, 25–20)			Shenzhen Gym

15 August 2011	Czech Republic	3–2	United States	Shenzhen Gym
15 August 2011	(23–25, 23–25, 25–23, 27–25, 15–13)			Shenzhen Gym

16 August 2011	United States	3–0	United Arab Emirates	Shenzhen Gym
16 August 2011	(25–21, 25–13, 25–20)			Shenzhen Gym

17 August 2011	Thailand	3–1	United States	Shenzhen Gym
17 August 2011	(25–15, 23–25, 25–19, 25–23)			Shenzhen Gym

==== Classification 9th-16th ====
19 August 2011; 15:40	United States	2–3	Japan	Shenzhen Gym; Referees: Hulka (UKR), Hagström (SWE)
19 August 2011; 15:40	(20–25, 25–23, 30–28, 21–25, 11–15)			Shenzhen Gym; Referees: Hulka (UKR), Hagström (SWE)

==== Classification 13th-16th ====
20 August 2011	Sweden	1–3	United States	Yuanping Gymnasium
20 August 2011	(21–25, 26–24, 10–25, 25–27)			Yuanping Gymnasium

==== 13th place match ====
21 August 2011	United States	3–1	Norway	Yuanping Gymnasium
21 August 2011	(25–19, 22–25, 25–16, 25–14)			Yuanping Gymnasium

== Water polo ==
The United States qualified both a men's and a women's team.

=== Men ===
The men's team participated in Group C. The United States qualified for the quarterfinals with only one loss to Serbia, the eventual gold medallists, in pool play. The men's team was well on its way to the final, but was edged by Russia in the semifinal and was relegated to the bronze medal match, where Macedonia defeated the United States. The men's team finished fourth overall.

==== Preliminary round ====
Team	Pld	W	D	L	GF	GA	GD	Pts
Serbia	3	2	0	1	39	11	+28	4
United States	3	2	0	1	30	16	+14	4
France	3	2	0	1	39	23	+16	4
Singapore	3	0	0	3	8	66	−58	0

August 11, 2011; 15:00	Report	United States	17–0	Singapore	Natatorium of Bao An District; Referees: Shiosaki (JPN), Sungu (TUR)
August 11, 2011; 15:00	Report	Score by quarters: 4-0, 4-0, 5-0, 4-0			Natatorium of Bao An District; Referees: Shiosaki (JPN), Sungu (TUR)
August 11, 2011; 15:00	Report	Wigo, Macdonell, Wright 3	Goals		Natatorium of Bao An District; Referees: Shiosaki (JPN), Sungu (TUR)

August 13, 2011; 12:40	Report	Serbia	8–2	United States	Natatorium of Bao An District; Referees: Stampalija (CRO), Sungu (TUR)
August 13, 2011; 12:40	Report	Score by quarters: 0-0, 4-0, 3-0, 1-2			Natatorium of Bao An District; Referees: Stampalija (CRO), Sungu (TUR)
August 13, 2011; 12:40	Report	Šaponjić, Petković 2	Goals	Wigo, Wright 1	Natatorium of Bao An District; Referees: Stampalija (CRO), Sungu (TUR)

August 15, 2011; 11:20	Report	United States	11–8	France	Natatorium of Bao An District; Referees: Gerzanich (RUS), Mackay (CAN)
August 15, 2011; 11:20	Report	Score by quarters: 2-3, 4-4, 5-1, 0-0			Natatorium of Bao An District; Referees: Gerzanich (RUS), Mackay (CAN)
August 15, 2011; 11:20	Report	Macdonell 4	Goals	Izdinsky 2	Natatorium of Bao An District; Referees: Gerzanich (RUS), Mackay (CAN)

==== Eighthfinals ====
August 17, 2011; 13:30	Report	United States	8–7	Hungary	Natatorium of Bao An District; Referees: Stavropoulos (GRE), Collantoni (ITA)
August 17, 2011; 13:30	Report	Score by quarters: 0–2, 2–0, 4–1, 2–4			Natatorium of Bao An District; Referees: Stavropoulos (GRE), Collantoni (ITA)
August 17, 2011; 13:30	Report	Wigo 3	Goals	Vamos 3	Natatorium of Bao An District; Referees: Stavropoulos (GRE), Collantoni (ITA)

==== Quarterfinals ====
August 19, 2011; 20:00	Report	Spain	9–10 (OT)	United States	Natatorium of Bao An District; Referees: Stampalija (CRO), Cao (CHN)
August 19, 2011; 20:00	Report	Score by quarters: 2–2, 3–3, 1–1, 2–2 OT: 1–2			Natatorium of Bao An District; Referees: Stampalija (CRO), Cao (CHN)
August 19, 2011; 20:00	Report	Carrillo Gemar 5	Goals	Wigo 3	Natatorium of Bao An District; Referees: Stampalija (CRO), Cao (CHN)

==== Semifinals ====
August 21, 2011; 20:00	Report	Russia	11–10	United States	Natatorium of Bao An District; Referees: Stampalija (CRO), Bartels (AUS)
August 21, 2011; 20:00	Report	Score by quarters: 1–1, 6–3, 3–3, 1–3			Natatorium of Bao An District; Referees: Stampalija (CRO), Bartels (AUS)
August 21, 2011; 20:00	Report	Ryzhov Alenichev, Lisunov 3	Goals	Wigo 4	Natatorium of Bao An District; Referees: Stampalija (CRO), Bartels (AUS)

==== Bronze medal match ====
August 23, 2011; 11:00	Report	North Macedonia	10–7	United States	Natatorium of Bao An District; Referees: Stavropoulos (GRE), Sungu (TUR)
August 23, 2011; 11:00	Report	Score by quarters: 4–1, 3–2, 1–1, 2–3			Natatorium of Bao An District; Referees: Stavropoulos (GRE), Sungu (TUR)
August 23, 2011; 11:00	Report	Mišić, Kalinić 3	Goals	Wigo, Lerman, Macdonell 2	Natatorium of Bao An District; Referees: Stavropoulos (GRE), Sungu (TUR)

=== Women ===
The women's team participated in Group B. The team went through the preliminary round undefeated, and fought their way to the final with close wins in the quarterfinals and semifinals. In the final, the United States was stunned by China in a ten-point loss, and earned a silver medal.

Team	Pld	W	D	L	GF	GA	GD	Pts
United States	4	4	0	0	42	30	+12	8
Russia	4	3	0	1	54	37	+17	6
Australia	4	1	1	2	34	32	+2	3
Mexico	4	1	1	2	37	48	−11	3
France	4	0	0	4	28	48	−20	0

==== Preliminary round ====
August 12, 2011; 12:40	Report	Australia	6–8	United States	Natatorium of Bao An District; Referees: Mackay (CAN), Teixido Bermudez (ESP)
August 12, 2011; 12:40	Report	Score by quarters: 1-3, 2-3, 2-2, 1-0			Natatorium of Bao An District; Referees: Mackay (CAN), Teixido Bermudez (ESP)
August 12, 2011; 12:40	Report	Brightwell 4	Goals	Lo 3	Natatorium of Bao An District; Referees: Mackay (CAN), Teixido Bermudez (ESP)

August 13, 2011; 18:30	Report	United States	10–6	France	Natatorium of Bao An District; Referees: Tan (SIN), Vogel (HUN)
August 13, 2011; 18:30	Report	Score by quarters: 3-2, 1-0, 3-1, 3-3			Natatorium of Bao An District; Referees: Tan (SIN), Vogel (HUN)
August 13, 2011; 18:30	Report	Reynolds, Dan, Menon 2	Goals	Guillet 3	Natatorium of Bao An District; Referees: Tan (SIN), Vogel (HUN)

August 14, 2011; 15:00	Report	Mexico	8–12	United States	Natatorium of Bao An District; Referees: Cao (CHN), Collantoni (ITA)
August 14, 2011; 15:00	Report	Score by quarters: 4-5, 0-3, 2-3, 2-1			Natatorium of Bao An District; Referees: Cao (CHN), Collantoni (ITA)
August 14, 2011; 15:00	Report	Orozco 3	Goals	Dan 3	Natatorium of Bao An District; Referees: Cao (CHN), Collantoni (ITA)

August 16, 2011; 16:20	Report	Russia	10–12	United States	Natatorium of Bao An District; Referees: Littlejohn (GBR), Teixido Bermudez (ESP)
August 16, 2011; 16:20	Report	Score by quarters: 4-4, 1-1, 4-2, 1-5			Natatorium of Bao An District; Referees: Littlejohn (GBR), Teixido Bermudez (ESP)
August 16, 2011; 16:20	Report	Antonova, Vylegzhanina 3	Goals	Dan 4	Natatorium of Bao An District; Referees: Littlejohn (GBR), Teixido Bermudez (ESP)

==== Quarterfinals ====
August 18, 2011; 14:30	Report	Great Britain	8–11	United States	Natatorium of Bao An District; Referees: Delon (FRA), Callejas Perez (MEX)
August 18, 2011; 14:30	Report	Score by quarters: 4-2, 0-2, 2-4, 2-3			Natatorium of Bao An District; Referees: Delon (FRA), Callejas Perez (MEX)
August 18, 2011; 14:30	Report	Wilcox 3	Goals	four players 2	Natatorium of Bao An District; Referees: Delon (FRA), Callejas Perez (MEX)

==== Semifinals ====
August 20, 2011; 14:30	Report	Italy	8–9	United States	Natatorium of Bao An District; Referees: Delon (FRA), Bartels (AUS)
August 20, 2011; 14:30	Report	Score by quarters: 2-2, 0-2, 2-3, 4-2			Natatorium of Bao An District; Referees: Delon (FRA), Bartels (AUS)
August 20, 2011; 14:30	Report	Garibotti 4	Goals	Robertson 3	Natatorium of Bao An District; Referees: Delon (FRA), Bartels (AUS)

==== Gold medal match ====
August 22, 2011; 13:30	Report	(silver) United States	4–14	China	Natatorium of Bao An District; Referees: Brasiliano (ITA), Delon (FRA)
August 22, 2011; 13:30	Report	Score by quarters: 0–3, 0–6, 2–3, 2–2			Natatorium of Bao An District; Referees: Brasiliano (ITA), Delon (FRA)
August 22, 2011; 13:30	Report	Robertson, Dan 2	Goals	Ma 4	Natatorium of Bao An District; Referees: Brasiliano (ITA), Delon (FRA)
