= Table tennis at the 2011 Summer Universiade – Men's singles =

The men's singles table tennis event at the 2011 Summer Universiade took place from August 15 to August 20 at the Shenzhen Bay Sports Center Gym in Shenzhen, China. The preliminary round was staged in pools, and the top players from each pool were moved to the elimination rounds.

== Medalists ==
Gold	Xu Xin; China
Silver	Yan An; China
Bronze	Kenji Matsudaira; Japan
Bronze	Fang Bo; China

== Preliminary round ==
Group 1

Player	Pld	W	L	GF	GA
Shang Kun (CHN)	2	2	6	1	0
Alexander Flemming (GER)	2	1	1	4	3
Chance Friend (USA)	2	0	2	0	6

Group 2

Player	Pld	W	L	GF	GA
Christoph Simoner (AUT)	2	2	0	6	0
Mohammed Ibrahim A Boradaha (KSA)	2	0	2	0	6
Chung Hyo Young (KOR)	2	1	1	3	3

Group 3

Player	Pld	W	L	GF	GA
Ovidiu George Ionescu (ROU)	2	2	0	6	1
Vitaly Efimov (POR)	2	1	1	4	3
Dilshan Chaturanga Sooriyaarachchi (SRI)	2	0	2	0	6

Group 4

Player	Pld	W	L	GF	GA
Kentaro Miuchi (JPN)	2	2	0	6	0
Guo Peng (CAN)	2	1	1	3	4
Enkhbatyn Lkhagvasüren (MGL)	2	0	2	1	6

Group 5

Player	Pld	W	L	GF	GA
Mikhail Gladyshev (RUS)	2	2	0	6	0
Tang Chi Ho (AUS)	2	1	1	3	3
Abrahim Abdulrahman S Al Issa (KSA)	2	0	2	0	6

Group 6

Player	Pld	W	L	GF	GA
Ievgen Pryshchepa (UKR)	2	2	0	6	1
William Berekorang Asare (GHA)	2	1	1	4	3
Sainbayar Orgil (MGL)	2	0	2	0	6

Group 7

Player	Pld	W	L	GF	GA
Lee Jae Hun (KOR)	2	2	0	6	1
Daniel Kriston (HUN)	2	1	1	4	3
Stanislav Golovanov (BUL)	2	0	2	0	6

Group 8

Player	Pld	W	L	GF	GA
Harald Andersson (SWE)	2	2	0	6	2
Shen Chimin (TPE)	2	1	1	5	4
Almir Divović (BIH)	2	0	2	1	6

Group 9

Player	Pld	W	L	GF	GA
Kim Min Kyu (KOR)	2	2	0	6	0
Lau Honsumsam (HKG)	2	1	1	3	3
Batmunkh Tamir (MGL)	2	0	2	0	6

Group 10

Player	Pld	W	L	GF	GA
Hu Bingtao (CHN)	2	2	0	6	1
David Zombori (HUN)	2	1	1	4	3
Michael Darkwah (GHA)	2	0	2	0	6

Group 11

Player	Pld	W	L	GF	GA
Viatcheslav Krivosheev (RUS)	2	2	0	6	0
Li Chunghimsamuel (HKG)	2	1	1	3	3
Sahanaka Randula Ganegodage (SRI)	2	0	2	0	6

Group 12

Player	Pld	W	L	GF	GA
Wang Yitse (TPE)	2	2	0	6	0
Dao Duy Hoang (VIE)	2	1	1	3	3
Gong Yuan (NZL)	2	0	2	0	6

Group 13

Player	Pld	W	L	GF	GA
Lennart Boris Wehking (GER)	2	2	0	6	0
Che Wengheng (MAC)	2	1	1	3	4
Samuditha Ishan de Silva (SRI)	2	0	2	1	6

Group 14

Player	Pld	W	L	GF	GA
Pierre Luc Hinse (CAN)	2	2	0	6	2
Romualdo Manna (ITA)	2	1	1	4	3
Cheong Chengwa (MAC)	2	0	2	1	6

Group 15

Player	Pld	W	L	GF	GA
Thomas le Breton (FRA)	2	2	0	6	0
Gints Eihmans (LAT)	2	1	1	3	4
Abdulaziz Al Magholth (KSA)	2	0	2	1	6

Group 16

Player	Pld	W	L	GF	GA
Hermann Muehlbach (GER)	2	1	1	5	6
Martin Storf (AUT)	2	1	1	3	3
Lidiney Castro (BRA)	2	1	1	3	5

Group 17

Player	Pld	W	L	GF	GA
Gencay Menge (TUR)	2	2	0	6	0
Alberto Margarone (ITA)	2	1	1	3	4
Michael Rod Pana (PHI)	2	0	2	1	6

Group 18

Player	Pld	W	L	GF	GA
Dmytro Pysar (UKR)	2	2	0	6	2
Josue Ernesto Donado Lopez (ESA)	2	1	1	5	3
William Rather (USA)	2	0	2	0	6

Group 19

Player	Pld	W	L	GF	GA
Mark Hazinski (USA)	2	2	0	6	0
Rock El Hakim (LIB)	2	1	1	3	5
Hosam Thafer A Al Kalali (KSA)	2	0	2	2	6

Group 20

Player	Pld	W	L	GF	GA
Wong Shingchunganthony (HKG)	2	2	0	6	2
Pere Navarro Galvez (ESP)	2	1	1	5	3
Mohammad Bahja (LIB)	2	0	2	0	6

Group 21

Player	Pld	W	L	GF	GA
Youn Joo Hyun (KOR)	2	2	0	6	0
Zhang Yahao (USA)	2	1	1	3	4
Gabriel Garcia Galipienso (ESP)	2	0	2	1	6

Group 22

Player	Pld	W	L	GF	GA
Nikom Wongsiri (THA)	2	2	0	6	1
Zhu Xibingyan (NZL)	2	1	1	4	3
Lo Chiman (MAC)	2	0	2	0	6

Group 23

Player	Pld	W	L	GF	GA
Lee Dong Jin (KOR)	2	2	0	6	1
Chung Wai Lung (NED)	2	1	1	4	3
Sergo Petridze (GEO)	2	0	2	0	6

Group 24

Player	Pld	W	L	GF	GA
Boris de Vries (NED)	2	2	0	6	1
Carlos Olea (CHI)	2	1	1	4	3
Gilberto Mauricio Aguilar Rosas (PAN)	2	0	2	0	6

Group 25

Player	Pld	W	L	GF	GA
Daniel Schaffer (HUN)	2	2	0	6	0
Do Duc Duy (VIE)	2	1	1	4	3
Abdulmohsen Abdullah A Al Rabiah (KSA)	2	0	2	0	6

Group 26

Player	Pld	W	L	GF	GA
Tran Huy Bao (VIE)	2	2	0	6	2
Andres Carlier (CHI)	2	1	1	3	3
Bryan Simcox (USA)	2	0	2	2	6

Group 27

Player	Pld	W	L	GF	GA
Fu Enti (TPE)	2	2	0	6	2
Phillip James Xiao (NZL)	2	1	1	5	3
José Barbosa (BRA)	2	0	2	0	6

Group 28

Player	Pld	W	L	GF	GA
Lkhagvadorj Altantulga (MGL)	2	2	0	6	1
Jonathon Schubert (AUS)	2	1	1	4	4
Darbet Theophilus Tripoli (PHI)	2	0	2	1	6

Group 29

Player	Pld	W	L	GF	GA
Paolo Bisi (ITA)	2	2	0	6	1
Juan Morego Valls Jove (ESP)	2	1	1	4	3
Mohamad Bannout (LIB)	2	0	2	0	6

Group 30

Player	Pld	W	L	GF	GA
David Powell (AUS)	2	2	0	6	1
Lei Mankei (MAC)	2	1	1	4	3
Ahmad Harb (LIB)	2	0	2	0	6

Group 31

Player	Pld	W	L	GF	GA
Sarayut Tancharoen (THA)	2	2	0	6	2
Olegs Kartuzovs (LAT)	2	1	1	5	4
Michael Brown (AUS)	2	0	2	1	6

Group 32

Player	Pld	W	L	GF	GA
Alexandru Petrescu (ROU)	2	2	6	0	0
Myles Collins (NZL)	2	1	1	3	3
Nelson Sinkala (ZAM)	2	0	2	0	6

Group 33

Player	Pld	W	L	GF	GA
Avo Moumjoghlian (LIB)	2	1	1	4	3
Yang Ling Kun (CAN)	2	1	1	4	4
Josef Casper ter Luun (NED)	2	1	1	3	4

Group 34

Player	Pld	W	L	GF	GA
Hasan Dogan (TUR)	2	2	0	6	2
Hermenegildo Sebastiao (ANG)	2	1	1	5	3
David Senyo Kofi Ahiaba (GHA)	2	0	2	0	6

Group 35

Player	Pld	W	L	GF	GA
Chanakarn Udomsilp (THA)	2	2	0	6	1
Chang Hoiwa (MAC)	2	1	1	4	4
Antonio Lemos (ANG)	2	0	2	1	6

Group 36

Player	Pld	W	L	GF	GA
Bernardo Quifica (ANG)	2	1	1	5	3
Roger Pacharlin Ndzoli (CGO)	2	1	1	5	5
Raymond Donkor (GHA)	2	1	1	3	5

Group 37

Player	Pld	W	L	GF	GA
Pasan Sukitha Wickramanayake (SRI)	3	3	0	9	2
Zorigt Turbold (MGL)	3	2	1	7	3
Todd Gregory (CAN)	3	1	2	4	6
Janis Cirulis (LAT)	3	0	3	0	9

== Elimination Draw ==
=== Finals ===
Quarterfinals
Xu Xin (CHN)	14	11	11	5	11
Mikhail Paykov (RUS)	12	5	5	11	7
Kenji Matsudaira (JPN)	11	11	11	12
Shang Kun (CHN)	9	7	4	10
Jin Ueda (JPN)	11	1	8	9	6
Fang Bo (CHN)	3	11	11	11	11
Yan An (CHN)	11	7	12	13	11
Hu Bingtao (CHN)	2	11	10	11	7

Semifinals
Xu Xin (CHN)	8	11	3	7	11	11	11
Kenji Matsudaira (JPN) (bronze)	11	3	11	11	5	6	1
Fang Bo (CHN) (bronze)	6	11	7	13
Yan An (CHN)	11	13	11	15

Final
Xu Xin (CHN) (gold)	14	11	11	11
Yan An (CHN) (silver)	12	8	7	6

=== Top half ===
==== Section 1 ====
First Round
Xu Xin (CHN)	11	11	11	11
Guo Peng (CAN)	5	9	7	6
Sarayut Tancharoen (THA)	3	11	5	7	7
Wang Yitse (TPE)	11	9	11	11	11
Lkhagvadorj Altantulga (MGL)	6	2	9	5
Lee Jae Hun (KOR)	11	11	11	11
Olegs Kartuzovs (LAT)	8	7	7	7
Abdel-Kader Salifou (FRA)	11	11	11	11
Mikhail Paykov (RUS)	11	11	11	12
Mark Hazinski (USA)	2	6	6	10
Avo Moumjoghlian (LIB)	8	4	6	4
Ievgen Pryshchepa (UKR)	11	11	11	11
Wong Shingchunganthony (HKG)	9	10	7	5
Paolo Bisi (ITA)	11	12	11	11
Alexander Flemming (GER)	9	11	9	6	11	4
Ryusuke Karube (JPN)	11	8	11	11	4	11

Second Round
Xu Xin (CHN)	11	11	11	11
Wang Yitse (TPE)	4	5	7	4
Lee Jae Hun (KOR)	11	13	7	12	6	8
Abdel-Kader Salifou (FRA)	9	15	11	10	11	11
Mikhail Paykov (RUS)	11	11	11	4	6	11
Ievgen Pryshchepa (UKR)	9	9	9	11	11	9
Paolo Bisi (ITA)	10	7	6	3
Ryusuke Karube (JPN)	12	11	11	11

Third Round
Xu Xin (CHN)	13	11	12	11
Abdel-Kader Salifou (FRA)	11	8	10	5
Mikhail Paykov (RUS)	8	15	4	11	11	11
Ryusuke Karube (JPN)	11	13	11	5	5	8

Quarterfinals
Xu Xin (CHN)	14	11	11	5	11
Mikhail Paykov (RUS)	12	5	5	11	7

==== Section 2 ====
First Round
Kenji Matsudaira (JPN)	11	11	11	15
Tang Chi Ho (AUS)	4	7	4	13
Alexandru Petrescu (ROU)	11	11	11	11
Nikom Wongsiri (THA)	8	6	6	6
Gencay Menge (TUR)	11	11	11	11
Tran Huy Bao (VIE)	4	7	8	9
Pasan Sukitha Wickramanayake (SRI)	10	4	1	11	7
Yaroslav Zhmudenko (UKR)	12	11	11	9	11
Chen Chienan (TPE)	11	11	11	11
Lau Honsumsam (HKG)	2	6	3	6
Viatcheslav Krivosheev (RUS)	11	13	4	10	11	11	6
Shang Kun (CHN)	13	11	11	12	8	9	11
Kim Min Kyu (KOR)	9	8	9	9
Kentaro Miuchi (JPN)	11	11	11	11
David Zombori (HUN)	9	11	3	3	2
Emmanuel Lebesson (FRA)	11	9	11	11	11

Second Round
Kenji Matsudaira (JPN)	12	11	11	10	11
Alexandru Petrescu (ROU)	10	5	4	12	8
Gencay Menge (TUR)	11	11	11	11
Yaroslav Zhmudenko (UKR)	6	6	8	3
Chen Chienan (TPE)	3	8	8	11	11	6
Shang Kun (CHN)	11	11	11	8	5	11
Kentaro Miuchi (JPN)	11	7	7	6	9
Emmanuel Lebesson (FRA)	9	11	11	11	11

Third Round
Kenji Matsudaira (JPN)	11	11	11	11
Gencay Menge (TUR)	6	8	5	3
Shang Kun (CHN)	5	11	9	11	11	11
Emmanuel Lebesson (FRA)	11	9	11	9	6	5

Quarterfinals
Kenji Matsudaira (JPN)	11	11	11	12
Shang Kun (CHN)	9	7	4	10

=== Bottom half ===
==== Section 3 ====
First Round
Alexander Shibaev (RUS)	11	11	10	9	11	13	11
Li Chunghimsamuel (HKG)	7	5	12	11	7	15	5
Dmytro Pysar (UKR)	11	11	11	14
Hasan Dogan (TUR)	9	2	5	12
Christoph Simoner (AUT)	9	11	11	13	11
Lee Dong Jin (KOR)	11	8	6	11	6
Boris de Vries (NED)	2	8	11	12	2	7
Jin Ueda (JPN)	11	11	8	10	11	11
Huang Shengsheng (TPE)	11	11	13	11
Daniel Kriston (HUN)	1	7	11	8
Thomas le Breton (FRA)	11	11	4	11	11
Chanakarn Udomsilp (THA)	9	6	11	6	8
Lennart Boris Wehking (GER)	11	11	11	9	11
Pierre Luc Hinse (CAN)	9	3	9	11	9
William Berekorang Asare (GHA)	4	6	6	1
Fang Bo (CHN)	11	11	11	11

Second Round
Alexander Shibaev (RUS)	11	12	11	11
Dmytro Pysar (UKR)	6	10	6	8
Christoph Simoner (AUT)	5	6	4	11	11
Jin Ueda (JPN)	11	11	11	8	13
Huang Shengsheng (TPE)	11	11	10	11	12
Thomas le Breton (FRA)	4	2	12	2	10
Lennart Boris Wehking (GER)	7	5	3	11
Fang Bo (CHN)	11	11	11	13

Third Round
Alexander Shibaev (RUS)	8	13	4	14	6
Jin Ueda (JPN)	11	15	11	12	11
Huang Shengsheng (TPE)	11	7	8	11	6	12
Fang Bo (CHN)	9	11	11	9	11	14

Quarterfinals
Jin Ueda (JPN)	11	1	8	9	6
Fang Bo (CHN)	3	11	11	11	11

==== Section 4 ====
First Round
Hiromitsu Kasahara (JPN)	w/o
Do Duc Duy (VIE)
Youn Joo Hyun (KOR)	8	8	13	11	11	12
Fu Enti (TPE)	11	11	11	9	9	10
Hermann Muehlbach (GER)	6	5	11	9	11	7
Ovidiu George Ionescu (ROU)	11	11	4	11	8	11
Bernardo Quifica (ANG)	3	4	4	3
Yan An (CHN)	11	11	11	11
Matiss Burgis (LAT)	11	7	11	4	4	11	11
Harald Andersson (SWE)	7	11	9	11	11	3	3
Mikhail Gladyshev (RUS)	11	11	11	11
David Powell (AUS)	6	7	2	9
Daniel Schaffer (HUN)	12	9	7	7	4
Hu Bingtao (CHN)	10	11	11	11	11
Zhu Xibingyan (NZL)	5	3	7	4
Adrien Mattenet (FRA)	11	11	11	11

Second Round
Hiromitsu Kasahara (JPN)	9	12	8	11	8
Youn Joo Hyun (KOR)	11	14	11	9	11
Ovidiu George Ionescu (ROU)	8	2	12	7	4
Yan An (CHN)	11	11	10	11	11
Matiss Burgis (LAT)	11	11	11	9	11
Mikhail Gladyshev (RUS)	4	9	5	11	5
Hu Bingtao (CHN)	11	3	11	5	11	12
Adrien Mattenet (FRA)	6	11	9	11	7	10

Third Round
Youn Joo Hyun (KOR)	5	13	4	12	5
Yan An (CHN)	11	15	11	10	11
Matiss Burgis (LAT)	11	6	7	1	6
Hu Bingtao (CHN)	9	11	11	11	11

Quarterfinals
Yan An (CHN)	11	7	12	13	11
Hu Bingtao (CHN)	2	11	10	11	7
