= Table tennis at the 2011 Summer Universiade – Men's team =

The men's team table tennis event at the 2011 Summer Universiade was held from August 13 to August 16 at the Shenzhen Bay Sport Center Gym in Shenzhen, China. The teams played in pools in a round robin preliminary round, and the top teams from each pool advanced to the playoffs.

== Medals ==
Gold	China; China
Silver	Japan; Japan
Bronze	Chinese Taipei; Chinese Taipei
Bronze	France; France

== Round robin ==
=== Group A ===
Nation	Pld	W	L	GF	GA
China (CHN)	2	2	0	6	0
Canada (CAN)	2	1	1	3	4
Australia (AUS)	2	0	2	1	6

=== Group B ===
Nation	Pld	W	L	GF	GA
France (FRA)	2	2	0	6	0
Turkey (TUR)	2	1	1	3	4
Saudi Arabia (KSA)	2	0	2	1	6

=== Group C ===
Nation	Pld	W	L	GF	GA
Germany (GER)	2	2	0	6	0
Vietnam (VIE)	2	1	1	3	3
Lebanon (LIB)	2	0	2	0	6

=== Group D ===
Nation	Pld	W	L	GF	GA
Japan (JPN)	2	2	0	6	0
Netherlands (NED)	2	1	1	3	4
United States (USA)	2	0	2	1	6

=== Group E ===
Nation	Pld	W	L	GF	GA
Ukraine (UKR)	3	3	0	9	0
South Korea (KOR)	3	2	1	6	3
Mongolia (MGL)	3	1	2	3	7
Sri Lanka (SRI)	3	0	3	1	9

=== Group F ===
Nation	Pld	W	L	GF	GA
Hong Kong (HKG)	3	3	0	9	0
Hungary (HUN)	3	2	1	6	3
Angola (ANG)	3	1	2	3	7
Ghana (GHA)	3	0	3	1	9

=== Group G ===
Nation	Pld	W	L	GF	GA
Russia (RUS)	3	3	0	9	1
Italy (ITA)	3	2	1	6	5
Latvia (LAT)	3	1	2	6	7
Macau (MAC)	3	0	3	1	9

=== Group H ===
Nation	Pld	W	L	GF	GA
Chinese Taipei (TPE)	3	3	0	9	0
Spain (ESP)	3	2	1	6	6
Thailand (THA)	3	1	2	5	7
New Zealand (NZL)	3	0	3	2	9

== Playoffs ==
Round of 16
A1	China (CHN)	3	3	3
D2	Netherlands (NED)	0	0	0
G2	Italy (ITA)	1	0	2
E1	Ukraine (UKR)	3	3	3
H1	Chinese Taipei (TPE)	w/o
B2	Turkey (TUR)
F2	Hungary (HUN)	2	3	3	3
C1	Germany (GER)	3	0	1	1
D1	Japan (JPN)	3	3	3
C2	Vietnam (VIE)	0	1	0
H2	Spain (ESP)	0	1	1
F1	Hong Kong (HKG)	3	3	3
G1	Russia (RUS)	3	2	3	3
E2	South Korea (KOR)	1	3	0	0
A2	Canada (CAN)	0	0	0
B1	France (FRA)	3	3	3

Quarterfinals
A1	China (CHN)	3	3	3
E1	Ukraine (UKR)	1	0	0
H1	Chinese Taipei (TPE)	3	3	3
F2	Hungary (HUN)	0	0	0
D1	Japan (JPN)	3	3	3
F1	Hong Kong (HKG)	0	0	0
G1	Russia (RUS)	0	3	0	0
B1	France (FRA)	3	1	3	3

Semifinals
A1	China (CHN)	3	3	3
H1	Chinese Taipei (TPE) (bronze)	1	0	1
D1	Japan (JPN)	3	3	3
B1	France (FRA) (bronze)	2	1	0

Final
A1	China (CHN) (gold)	3	3	2	3
D1	Japan (JPN) (silver)	0	0	3	1
