= Sailing at the 2011 Summer Universiade =

Sailing competition

Sailing at the XXVI Summer Universiade
- Venue: Seven Star Bay Marina and Shenzhen Maritime Sports Base & Sailing School
- Dates: 16–22 August

Sailing was contested at the 2011 Summer Universiade at the Seven Star Bay Marina and the Shenzhen Maritime Sports Base & Sailing School in Shenzhen, China. Fleet sailing and team sailing events were held.

== Medal summary ==
=== Medal table ===
Rank	Nation	Gold	Silver	Bronze	Total
1	China (CHN)	4	1	0	5
2	Russia (RUS)	2	0	2	4
3	United States (USA)	1	1	0	2
4	Croatia (CRO)	1	0	0	1
5	Japan (JPN)	0	1	2	3
6	Brazil (BRA)	0	1	1	2
6	Poland (POL)	0	1	1	2
8	Australia (AUS)	0	1	0	1
8	Germany (GER)	0	1	0	1
8	Singapore (SIN)	0	1	0	1
11	France (FRA)	0	0	1	1
11	South Korea (KOR)	0	0	1	1
Totals (12 entries)		8	8	8	24

=== Fleet events ===
==== Men ====
Event	Gold	Silver	Bronze
470	Russia (RUS); Vladimir Chaus; Denis Gribanov	Brazil (BRA); Fábio Silva; Gustavo Thiesen	Japan (JPN); Erika Tokushige; Jumpei Hokazono
Sailboard	Fang Zhennan; China	Łukasz Grodzicki; Poland	Lee Tae-hoon; South Korea
Laser Standard class	Daniel Mihelić; Croatia	Malte Kamrath; Germany	Sergey Komissarov; Russia

==== Women ====
Event	Gold	Silver	Bronze
Sailboard	Chen Peina; China	Megumi Komine; Japan	Małgorzata Białecka; Poland
Laser Radial class	Zhang Dongshuang; China	Victoria Jing Hua Chan; Singapore	Yevgeniya Kuznetsova; Russia

=== Team events ===
Event	Gold	Silver	Bronze
T293 class	China (CHN); Xie Lidiao; Chen Zhiwei	China (CHN); Wu Shifu; Chen Lina	Japan (JPN); Megumi Izedo; Jun Ogawa
Laser Radial class	United States (USA); Colin Smith; Frederick Strammer; Elizabeth Barry	Australia (AUS); Alexandra Jane South; Tristan Brown; James Burnam	France (FRA); Mathilde de Kerangat; Jules Ferrer; Antony Muñoz
470	Russia (RUS); Vladimir Chaus; Denis Gribanov; Alisa Kirilyuk; Liudmila Dmitrieva	United States (USA); Perry Emsiek; Scott Furnary; Zeke Horowitz; Alyssa Aitken	Brazil (BRA); Gustavo Thiesen; Fábio Silva; Isabel Swan; Martine Grael
