= Sweden at the 2011 Summer Universiade =

- IOC code: SWE

in Shenzhen
- Medals: Gold 0 Silver 0 Bronze 1 Total 1

Summer Universiade appearances
- 1959; 1961; 1963; 1965; 1967; 1970; 1973; 1975; 1977; 1979; 1981; 1983; 1985; 1987; 1989; 1991; 1993; 1995; 1997; 1999; 2001; 2003; 2005; 2007; 2009; 2011; 2013; 2015; 2017; 2019; 2021; 2025; 2027

Sweden competed at the 2011 Summer Universiade in Shenzhen, China.

== Athletics ==
Track & road events

Athlete	Event	Heat		Semifinal		Final	
Athlete	Event	Result	Rank	Result	Rank	Result	Rank
Christopher Svensson	Men's 400 m	51.05	45	did not advance			
Christopher Svensson	Men's 800 m	1:58.36	46	did not advance			
Tommy Granlund	Men's 800 m	1:49.99	7 q	1:49.09	17	did not advance	
Johan Hydén	Men's 1500 m	did not start		did not advance			
Henrik Löfås	Men's 5000 m	did not finish		—		did not advance	
Henrik Löfås	Men's 10,000 m	—				32:45.16	7

Track events

Athlete	Event	Qualification		Final	
Athlete	Event	Distance	Position	Distance	Position
Philip Frifelt	Men's high jump	2.00	21	did not advance	
Ellen Björklund	Women's high jump	1.75	14	did not advance	
Erica Jarder	Women's long jump	6.15	13	did not advance	
Josefin Berg	Women's hammer throw	59.48	18	did not advance	

== Badminton ==
Athlete	Event	Round of 32	Round of 16	Quarterfinal	Semifinal	Final
Athlete	Event	Opposition Score	Opposition Score	Opposition Score	Opposition Score	Opposition Score
Karolina Kotte	Women's singles	Shizuka Inoue (JPN); L14–21, 4–21	did not advance			

== Basketball ==
=== Women's tournament ===
Preliminary round

Team	Pld	W	L	PF	PA	PD	Pts
Australia	3	3	0	269	179	+90	6
Sweden	3	2	1	238	207	+31	5
Czech Republic	3	1	2	228	243	−15	4
Japan	3	0	3	212	318	−106	3

14 August 2011
18:00

Report

Australia	71–58	Sweden
Scoring by quarter: 15–15, 24–14, 20–14, 12–15
Pts: Bishop, Penaluna 14; Rebs: Bishop, Penaluna 8 Asts: Hunt, Ebzery 4		Pts: F. Eldebrink 12; Rebs: F. Eldebrink 9 Asts: Halvarsson 2

Gymnasium of Pingshan Sports Center, Shenzhen
Referees: Rafael Ganiev (RUS)

15 August 2011
12:30

Report

Sweden	72–63	Czech Republic
Scoring by quarter: 20–16, 21–19, 16–11, 15–17
Pts: Abdi 17; Rebs: F Eldebrink 8 Asts: E Eldebrin, Abdi 2		Pts: Pecková 16; Rebs: Pecková 7 Asts: Bartonova 3

Gymnasium of Pingshan Sports Center, Shenzhen
Referees: Boris Schmidt (GER)

16 August 2011
15:30

Report

Japan	73–108	Sweden
Scoring by quarter: 23–29, 13–28, 23–23, 14–28
Pts: Sato 19; Rebs: Amano 6 Asts: Sato 5		Pts: Eldebrink 24; Rebs: Loyd 12; Asts: four players 3

Shenzhen Luohu Gymnasium, Shenzhen
Referees: Liu Wei (CHN)

Quarter-final

18 August 2011
20:30

Report

Russia	60–68	Sweden
Scoring by quarter: 10–14, 10–15, 23–18, 17–21
Pts: Petrushina 13; Rebs: Cherepanova 9 Asts: Khrustaleba 3		Pts: F. Eldebrink 22; Rebs: F. Eldebrink, Halvarsson 8 Asts: Halvarsson 2

Gymnasium of Pingshan Sports Center, Shenzhen
Referees: Liu Wei (CHN)

Semi-final

19 August 2011
18:00

Report

Chinese Taipei	71–70 (OT)	Sweden
Scoring by quarter: 13–23, 17–4, 24–19, 10–18, Overtime: 7–6
Pts: Chen YC 22; Rebs: Huang YL 8 Asts: Huang PJ 5		Pts: Halvarsson 20; Rebs: F. Eldebrink, Loyd 11; Asts: F. Eldebrink, Loyd 3

Main Gymnasium of Universiade Center, Shenzhen
Referees: Milija Vojinovic (SRB)

Bronze medal game

21 August 2011
19:00

Report

Sweden	56–66	Australia
Scoring by quarter: 13–14, 16–14, 14–8, 13–30
Pts: Halvarsson 20; Rebs: E Eldebrin 6 Asts: F Eldebrin, Loyd 1		Pts: Bishop 21; Rebs: Tolo 8 Asts: Cumming 3

Main Gymnasium of Universiade Center, Shenzhen
Referees: Lauren Holtkamp Bass (USA)

== Table tennis ==
Athlete	Event	Group stage			Round of 64	Round of 32	Round of 16	Quarterfinal	Semifinal	Final
Athlete	Event	Opposition Score	Opposition Score	Rank	Opposition Score	Opposition Score	Opposition Score	Opposition Score	Opposition Score	Opposition Score
Harald Andersson	Men's singles	Almir Divorić (BIH); W 3–0	Shen Chimin (TPE); W 3–2	1	Matīss Burģis (LAT); L 3–4	did not advance				

== Volleyball ==
=== Men's tournament ===
Preliminary round

Pos	Team	Pld	W	L	Pts	SW	SL	SR	SPW	SPL	SPR
1	Brazil	4	4	0	8	12	2	6.000	364	263	1.384
2	South Korea	4	3	1	7	10	6	1.667	384	333	1.153
3	Israel	4	2	2	6	9	6	1.500	323	305	1.059
4	Sweden	4	1	3	5	4	9	0.444	262	295	0.888
5	Hong Kong	4	0	4	4	0	12	0.000	163	300	0.543

Date		Score		Set 1	Set 2	Set 3	Set 4	Set 5	Total
12 August	Israel	3–0	Sweden	25–15	25–18	25–19			75–52
15 August	Sweden	3–0	Hong Kong	25–21	25–13	25–12			75–46
16 August	Brazil	3–0	Sweden	25–15	28–26	25–17			78–58
17 August	Sweden	1–3	South Korea	25–19	12–25	15–25	25–27		77–96

Classification 9th–16th places

Date		Score		Set 1	Set 2	Set 3	Set 4	Set 5	Total
19 August	Australia	3–2	Sweden	14–25	25–21	20–25	25–16	15–12	99–99

Classification 13th–16th places

Date		Score		Set 1	Set 2	Set 3	Set 4	Set 5	Total
20 August	Sweden	1–3	United States	21–25	26–24	10–25	25–27		82–101

Classification 15th–16th place

Date		Score		Set 1	Set 2	Set 3	Set 4	Set 5	Total
21 August	Sweden	3–1	Mexico	25–21	25–20	25–27	25–18		100–86

=== Women's tournament ===
Preliminary round

Pos	Team	Pld	W	L	Pts	SW	SL	SR	SPW	SPL	SPR
1	China	3	3	0	6	9	1	9.000	247	184	1.342
2	Japan	3	2	1	5	7	4	1.750	262	199	1.317
3	Belgium	3	1	2	4	4	6	0.667	210	209	1.005
4	Sweden	3	0	3	3	0	9	0.000	98	225	0.436

Date		Score		Set 1	Set 2	Set 3	Set 4	Set 5	Total
14 August	Sweden	0–3	Japan	6–25	9–25	11–25			26–75
15 August	Sweden	0–3	China	14–25	13–25	11–25			38–75
16 August	Belgium	3–0	Sweden	25–9	25–13	25–12			75–34

Classification 9th–15th places

Date		Score		Set 1	Set 2	Set 3	Set 4	Set 5	Total
18 August	Canada	3–1	Sweden	25–17	21–25	25–22	25–23		96–87

Classification 13th–15th places

Date		Score		Set 1	Set 2	Set 3	Set 4	Set 5	Total
19 August	Sweden	3–0	Norway	25–11	25–15	25–21			75–47

Classification 13th–14th places

Date		Score		Set 1	Set 2	Set 3	Set 4	Set 5	Total
20 August	France	3–0	Sweden	25–16	25–15	25–23			75–54
