= Tim Phillips (swimmer) =

American swimmer (born 1990)

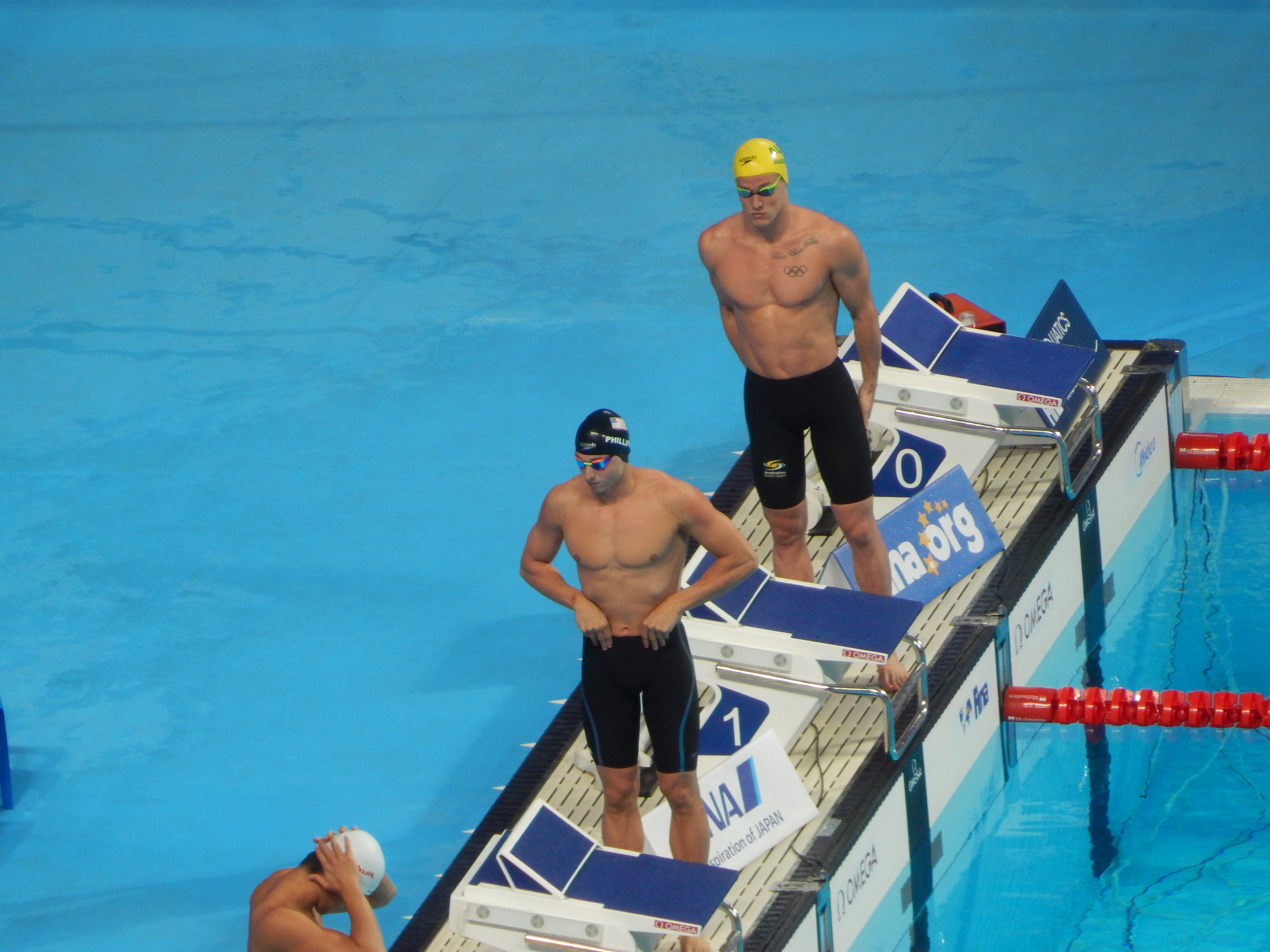
- Phillips (black cap) and Hadler (yellow cap) in Kazan 2015

Personal information
- Full name: Timothy Phillips
- Nickname: "Tim"
- National team: United States
- Born: November 30, 1990 (age 35) Haimhausen, Germany
- Height: 5 ft 11 in (180 cm)
- Weight: 160 lb (73 kg)

Sport
- Sport: Swimming
- Strokes: Butterfly, freestyle
- Club: SwimMAC Carolina
- College team: Ohio State University
Medal record
Men's swimming
Representing the United States
World Championships (LC)
Gold medal – first place	2015 Kazan	4×100 m medley
Gold medal – first place	2017 Budapest	4×100 m medley
Summer Universiade
Gold medal – first place	2011 Shenzhen	50 m butterfly
Gold medal – first place	2011 Shenzhen	100 m butterfly
Gold medal – first place	2011 Shenzhen	4×100 m freestyle
Silver medal – second place	2011 Shenzhen	4×100 m medley

Timothy Phillips (born November 30, 1990) is an American competition swimmer. He swam for the Ohio State Buckeyes, earning numerous All-Big Ten and All-America honors.

== Swimming career ==
At the 2010 FINA Short Course World Championships in Dubai, Phillips placed 21st in the 50 m butterfly with a time of 23.47 in qualifying and 14th in the 100 m butterfly with a semifinal time of 51.50.

At the 2011 Summer Universiade in Shenzhen, Phillips earned the first international medal of his career, a gold, in the 50 m butterfly. On the same day of his 50 m butterfly gold, Phillips then competed in the 4x100 m freestyle relay with Jimmy Feigen, Kohlton Norys, and Robert Savulich. As the second leg, Phillips had a split of 48.96 and the American team won the gold with a time of 3:15.84. In the 100 m butterfly, Phillips won the gold ahead of compatriot Tom Shields in a time of 52.06, becoming the first American man to win the event since 1995. In the 4x100 m medley relay, Phillips earned a silver medal with Rex Tullius, George Klein, and Jimmy Feigen. As the butterfly leg, Phillips had a split of 52.55.

At the 2012 U.S. Olympic Swimming Trials, Phillips finished the 100 meter butterfly final in sixth place with a time of 52.54 and failed to qualify for the London Olympic Games. His 50 meter split time of 23.62 was the fastest among the eight competitors.

At the 2015 World Aquatics Championships held in Kazan, Russia, Phillips swam the butterfly leg of the 4x100 m medley relay in the qualifying heat. His relay split was 51.03, helping the U.S. to the fastest time for the event final. Even though he did not swim in the event final for the winning U.S. relay team, Phillips earned a gold medal for his participation in the qualifying race.

At the 2016 U.S. Olympic Swimming Trials, Phillips finished the 100 meter butterfly final in fifth place with a time of 51.44 and failed to qualify for the Rio Olympic Games. In the semifinal race, he had finished in second place with a time of 51.28, which was then the fifth-fastest time in the world for the event in 2016.
