= Swimming at the 2011 Summer Universiade – Men's 10 kilometre marathon =

The men's 10 km competition of the open water swimming events at the 2011 Summer Universiade was held on August 13 of that year.

== Medalists ==
Gold	Silver	Bronze

== Results ==
Rank	Swimmer	Nationality	Time
	Christian Martin Reichert	Germany	
	Jonathan Pullon	New Zealand	
	Daniil Serebrennikov	Russia	
	Simone Ruffini	Italy	
	Xue Feng	China	
	Samuel Sheppard	Australia	
	Bai Lu	China	
	Charlie Cuignet	France	
	Connor Signorin	United States	
	Mattia Alberico	Italy	
	Ryan Feeley	United States	
	Victor Colonese	Brazil	
	Yasunari Hirai	Japan	
	Hector Ruiz Perez	Spain	
	Jan Posmourny	Czech Republic	
	Francois Xavier Desharnais	Canada	
	Kirill Abrosimov	Russia	
	Aimeson King	Canada	
