= Taekwondo at the 2011 Summer Universiade =

Taekwondo competition

Taekwondo at the XXVI Summer Universiade
- Venue: Shenzhen Conference and Exhibition Center
- Dates: August 18, 2011 – August 23, 2011

Taekwondo was contested at the 2011 Summer Universiade from August 18 to August 23 at the No. 6, No. 7, and No. 8 Pavilions at the Shenzhen Conference and Exhibition Center in Shenzhen, China.

== Medal summary ==
=== Medal table ===
Rank	Nation	Gold	Silver	Bronze	Total
1	South Korea (KOR)	7	3	4	14
2	China (CHN)	4	2	1	7
3	Russia (RUS)	3	0	3	6
4	Turkey (TUR)	2	4	4	10
5	Iran (IRI)	1	4	3	8
6	Chinese Taipei (TPE)	1	1	3	5
7	France (FRA)	1	1	2	4
8	Australia (AUS)	1	0	1	2
9	Thailand (THA)	1	0	0	1
10	Spain (ESP)	0	2	2	4
11	Vietnam (VIE)	0	1	3	4
12	Morocco (MAR)	0	1	1	2
13	Brazil (BRA)	0	1	0	1
13	Philippines (PHI)	0	1	0	1
15	Mexico (MEX)	0	0	6	6
16	Hungary (HUN)	0	0	2	2
17	Canada (CAN)	0	0	1	1
17	Cuba (CUB)	0	0	1	1
17	Cyprus (CYP)	0	0	1	1
17	Egypt (EGY)	0	0	1	1
17	Germany (GER)	0	0	1	1
17	Moldova (MDA)	0	0	1	1
17	United States (USA)	0	0	1	1
Totals (23 entries)		21	21	42	84

=== Events ===
==== Men's events ====
Event	Gold	Silver	Bronze
-54 kg (finweight)	Jerranat Nakaviroj; Thailand	Hsu Chia-lin; Chinese Taipei	Erdal Aldemir; Turkey
-54 kg (finweight)	Jerranat Nakaviroj; Thailand	Hsu Chia-lin; Chinese Taipei	Park Yong Han; South Korea
-58 kg (flyweight)	Safwan Khalil; Australia	Hadi Mostaan; Iran	Serkan Tok; Turkey
-58 kg (flyweight)	Safwan Khalil; Australia	Hadi Mostaan; Iran	Andrei Rotaru; Moldova
-63 kg (bantamweight)	Umut Bildik; Turkey	Stevens Barclais; France	Chu Yuan-chih; Chinese Taipei
-63 kg (bantamweight)	Umut Bildik; Turkey	Stevens Barclais; France	Alfonso Victoria Espinosa de Los Reyes; Mexico
-68 kg (featherweight)	Kim Hun; South Korea	Samuel Morrison; Philippines	Idulio Islas; Mexico
-68 kg (featherweight)	Kim Hun; South Korea	Samuel Morrison; Philippines	Cesar Mari Puerta; Spain
-74 kg (lightweight)	Kim Seon Uk; South Korea	Farzad Zolghadri; Iran	Christos Pilavakis; Cyprus
-74 kg (lightweight)	Kim Seon Uk; South Korea	Farzad Zolghadri; Iran	Fernando Salvador Corral Ortega; Mexico
-80 kg (welterweight)	Mehran Askari; Iran	Yunus Sarı; Turkey	Avet Osmanov; Russia
-80 kg (welterweight)	Mehran Askari; Iran	Yunus Sarı; Turkey	Issam Chernoubi; Morocco
-87 kg (middleweight)	Park Yong-Hyun; South Korea	Guilherme Félix; Brazil	Burak Eski; Turkey
-87 kg (middleweight)	Park Yong-Hyun; South Korea	Guilherme Félix; Brazil	Rouhollah Talebi; Iran
+87 kg (heavyweight)	Arsen Tcinaridze; Russia	Ali Sari; Turkey	Balázs Tóth; Hungary
+87 kg (heavyweight)	Arsen Tcinaridze; Russia	Ali Sari; Turkey	Robelis Despaigne; Cuba
Individual Poomsae	Zhu Yuxiang; China	Yang Ju Min; South Korea	Nguyen Dinh Toan; Vietnam
Individual Poomsae	Zhu Yuxiang; China	Yang Ju Min; South Korea	Ali Nadali; Iran
Team Poomsae	South Korea (KOR); An Jae Seong; Jang Jun Hee; Lee Sang-Mok	China (CHN); Guo Fan; Zhu Yuxiang; Zhan Wenpeng	Iran (IRI); Hossein Beheshti; Hamid Nazari; Armin Akbari
Team Poomsae	South Korea (KOR); An Jae Seong; Jang Jun Hee; Lee Sang-Mok	China (CHN); Guo Fan; Zhu Yuxiang; Zhan Wenpeng	Vietnam (VIE); Le Trung Anh; Le Hieu Nghia; Nguyen Dinh Toan

==== Women's events ====
Event	Gold	Silver	Bronze
-46 kg (finweight)	Anastasia Valueva; Russia	Rukiye Yıldırım; Turkey	Liao Wei-chun; Chinese Taipei
-46 kg (finweight)	Anastasia Valueva; Russia	Rukiye Yıldırım; Turkey	Itzel Manjarrez; Mexico
-49 kg (flyweight)	Alexandra Lychagina; Russia	Kim Jae Ah; South Korea	Hung Shih-han; Chinese Taipei
-49 kg (flyweight)	Alexandra Lychagina; Russia	Kim Jae Ah; South Korea	Maeva Coutant; France
-53 kg (bantamweight)	Hatice Kübra Yangın; Turkey	Laura Urriola Ateca; Spain	Aziza Chambers; United States
-53 kg (bantamweight)	Hatice Kübra Yangın; Turkey	Laura Urriola Ateca; Spain	Ivett Gonda; Canada
-57 kg (featherweight)	Marlène Harnois; France	Hou Yuzhuo; China	Ekaterina Musikhina; Russia
-57 kg (featherweight)	Marlène Harnois; France	Hou Yuzhuo; China	Kim So-Hee; South Korea
-62 kg (lightweight)	Noh Eun-Sil; South Korea	Eva Calvo Gomez; Spain	Carmen Marton; Australia
-62 kg (lightweight)	Noh Eun-Sil; South Korea	Eva Calvo Gomez; Spain	Edina Kotsis; Hungary
-67 kg (welterweight)	Guo Yunfei; China	Furkan Asena Aydın; Turkey	Woo Seu-Mi; South Korea
-67 kg (welterweight)	Guo Yunfei; China	Furkan Asena Aydın; Turkey	Seham Sawalhy; Egypt
-73 kg (middleweight)	Chuang Chiachia; Chinese Taipei	Park Mi Yeon; South Korea	Elena Gomez Martinez; Spain
-73 kg (middleweight)	Chuang Chiachia; Chinese Taipei	Park Mi Yeon; South Korea	Anne-Caroline Graffe; France
+73 kg (heavyweight)	Zhang Yongtong; China	Wiam Dislam; Morocco	Olga Ivanova; Russia
+73 kg (heavyweight)	Zhang Yongtong; China	Wiam Dislam; Morocco	Tuba Abus; Turkey
Individual Poomsae	Zhang Jingjing; China	Mahsa Mardani; Iran	Park Ji Young; South Korea
Individual Poomsae	Zhang Jingjing; China	Mahsa Mardani; Iran	Ollin Medina; Mexico
Team Poomsae	South Korea (KOR); Cho Sung Yae; Jung Seu Min; Kang Yu Jin	Iran (IRI); Nastaran Maleki; Mahsa Mardani; Golsoum Mollamadadkhani	China (CHN); Zhan Qi; Zhang Jingjing; Zhu Mengxue
Team Poomsae	South Korea (KOR); Cho Sung Yae; Jung Seu Min; Kang Yu Jin	Iran (IRI); Nastaran Maleki; Mahsa Mardani; Golsoum Mollamadadkhani	Vietnam (VIE); Nguyen Thi Le Kim; Nguyen Thi Thu Ngan; Chau Tuyet Van

==== Mixed events ====
Event	Gold	Silver	Bronze
Pairs Poomsae	South Korea (KOR); Lee Jin-Ho; Kang Su Ji	Vietnam (VIE); Nguyen Thi Thu Ngan; Le Hieu Nghia	Germany (GER); Claudia Beaujean; Thomas Sommer
Pairs Poomsae	South Korea (KOR); Lee Jin-Ho; Kang Su Ji	Vietnam (VIE); Nguyen Thi Thu Ngan; Le Hieu Nghia	Mexico (MEX); Gerardo Garcia; Ollin Medina
