= Beach volleyball at the 2011 Summer Universiade =

Beach volleyball at the XXVII Summer Universiade
- Venue: Dameisha Park
- Dates: August 11, 2011 – August 19, 2011

Beach volleyball will be contested at the 2011 Summer Universiade from August 13 to August 19 at the beach of Dameisha Park in Shenzhen, China. Thirty-two men's and women's teams will participate.

== Medal summary ==
=== Medal table ===
Rank	Nation	Gold	Silver	Bronze	Total
1	Germany (GER)	1	0	0	1
1	Poland (POL)	1	0	0	1
3	Russia (RUS)	0	1	0	1
3	United States (USA)	0	1	0	1
5	Brazil (BRA)	0	0	1	1
5	Ukraine (UKR)	0	0	1	1
Totals (6 entries)		2	2	2	6

=== Events ===
Event	Gold	Silver	Bronze
Men	Poland (POL); Michal Kadziola; Jakub Szalankiewicz	Russia (RUS); Sergey Prokopyev; Yury Bogatov	Ukraine (UKR); Sergiy Popov; Valeriy Samoday
Women	Germany (GER); Karla Borger; Britta Buethe	United States (USA); Heather Hughes; Emily Day	Brazil (BRA); Elize Maia Secomandi; Ágatha Bednarczuk
