= Adam Klein (swimmer) =

American swimmer (born 1988)

Personal information
- Full name: George Adam Klein IV
- Nicknames: AK 47, AK, BroskI
- Nationality: United States
- Born: November 29, 1988 (age 37) Jackson, Mississippi, U.S.
- Height: 6 ft 0 in (183 cm)
- Weight: 185 lb (84 kg)

Sport
- Sport: Swimming
- Events: Breaststroke; Medley Relay
- Strokes: Breaststroke
- Club: Crescent City Swim Club; New Orleans, LA
- College team: Auburn University
- Coach: Brett Hawke (Auburn)
Medal record
Men's swimming
Representing the United States
Summer Universiade
Silver medal – second place	2011 Shenzhen	4x100 m. medley relay

George "Adam" Klein IV (born November 29, 1988) is an American swimmer who attended and swam for Auburn University and competed in international competition including the 2011 Summer Universiade in Shenzhen, China, where he won a silver medal in the Men's 4x100 metre medley relay. He had formerly competed in the 2008 U.S. National Championships.

Klein was born November 29, 1988, one of three siblings to George and Maggie Klein in Jackson, Mississippi. After a family move, he attended Archbishop Rummel High School in Metairie, Louisiana, graduating in 2007. During his High School years, he competed in swimming from around 2003–2007, competing and training with the Crescent City Swim Club. At the Crescent City Club, a primary coach may have been Adam Falati, the club founder. In his Senior year, he was a member of the U.S. Junior National Team. At the U.S Senior National Championships, he swam in the breaststroke's 200-meter event, recording a 2:18.04, and also competed in the 100 breaststroke, but finished 46th.

== International competition ==
At the 2009 US National Championships and World Championship Trials, Klein placed second to Eric Shanteau in the 200m breaststroke with a time of 2:10.39, earning a place to compete at the 2009 World Aquatics Championships in Rome. At the 2009 World Aquatics Championship in Rome, Klein was disqualified from the 200m breaststroke preliminaries. At the 2009 Aquatic Championships, Klein also competed in the 50m breaststroke and placed 50th, out of 148 swimmers competing in the event.

== Auburn University ==
Klein attended Auburn University from around 2007-2011, where he competed on their swim team and trained under Head coach, and former Assistant Coach Brett Hawke from around 2007-2010. Hawke, who served as an Assistant coach at the 2008 Olympics, was a former Auburn swimmer and two-time Olympian. He began as Head Coach at Auburn in 2009, remaining through around 2018, having served as an Assistant Coach from 2006-2009. At Auburn, Klein made All-American honors in eight instances, and won an NCAA National title as part of a 400 Medley Relay team. In Southeastern Conference, he earned a first place conference championship title in the 100 breaststroke, and twice earned championship titles as part of a 400 Medley relay team. An able student, he was part of the Southeastern Conference scholastic honor roll. While at Auburn, he participated in the 2008 Olympic trials in breaststroke, but did not qualify for the U.S. team.
