= Paolo Bisi =

Italian comic book artist

Paolo Bisi (born September 27, 1964, in Piacenza, Italy), is an Italian comic book artist, mostly known for his work on "Mister No", "Zagor" and "Lazarus Ledd" series.

He won the national Italian competition for young comics artist "Pierrlamibichi" in Prato, in 1981. After getting his degree at the Art Institute of Parma, he worked between 1987 and 1993 as a storyboard and layout artist, as well as illustrator for children books, for numerous clients in Milan.

He returned to comics in 1992, with "La Casa dei Fantasmi", a story he created with writer Marcello Toninelli, published in Dark Magazine (Granata Press). He then worked with writer Ade Capone on "Requiem" (Intrepido and Liberty publishers, 1995) and two "Lazarus Ledd" stories (Star Comics).

In 1996, Bisi joined the regular staff of Sergio Bonelli Editore, drawing series "Mister No" and "Zagor". He also made three-part series "Manson" with Cédric Rassat for the French publisher Glénat, about serial killer Charles Manson (2008-2010).
