= Poland at the 2011 Summer Universiade =

- IOC code: POL

in Shenzhen
- Competitors: 24 in 2 sports
- Medals Ranked 11th: Gold 5 Silver 4 Bronze 7 Total 16

Summer Universiade appearances
- 1959; 1961; 1963; 1965; 1967; 1970; 1973; 1975; 1977; 1979; 1981; 1983; 1985; 1987; 1989; 1991; 1993; 1995; 1997; 1999; 2001; 2003; 2005; 2007; 2009; 2011; 2013; 2015; 2017; 2019; 2021; 2025; 2027

Poland competed at the 2011 Summer Universiade in Shenzhen, China.

== Medalists ==
Medal	Name	Sport	Event
Gold	Żaneta Glanc	Athletics	Women's discus throw
Gold	Paweł Fajdek	Athletics	Men's hammer throw
Gold	Michal Kadziola; Jakub Szalankiewicz	Beach volleyball	Men's tournament
Gold	Zuzanna Pawlikowska	Judo	Women's 52 kg
Gold	Łukasz Michalski	Athletics	Men's pole vault
Silver	Wojciech Theiner	Athletics	Men's high jump
Silver	Jakub Trzebinski	Shooting	Men's trap
Silver	Maciej Sarnacki	Judo	Men's +100 kg
Silver	Hanna Lyczbinska; Marta Lyczbinska; Katarzyna Kryczalo; Karolina Chlewińska	Fencing	Women's team foil
Bronze	Paweł Korzeniowski	Swimming	Men's 100 metre butterfly
Bronze	Poland	Shooting	Men's 50 metre pistol team
Bronze	Jakub Trzebinski; Lukasz Szum; Piotr Kowalczyk	Shooting	Men's trap team
Bronze	Piotr Kurkiewicz	Judo	Men's 73 kg
Bronze	Joanna Jaworska; Agata Ozdoba; Zuzanna Pawlikowska; Agata Perenc; Katarzyna Furmanek	Judo	Women's team
Bronze	Katarzyna Kryczalo	Fencing	Women's foil

== Basketball ==
Poland qualified a women's team.

=== Group C ===
Team	Pld	W	L	PF	PA	PD	Pts.
Russia	2	2	0	126	91	+35	4
Canada	2	1	1	98	123	-25	3
Poland	2	0	2	95	105	−10	2

August 14, 2011
10:00

Report

Poland	50–52	Canada
Scoring by quarter: 15–15, 10–11, 10–12, 15–14
Pts: Skobel 15; Rebs: Kotnis, Kaczmarczyk, Skobel 5 Asts: five players 1		Pts: Ross 13; Rebs: Ross 8 Asts: Colley, Miyazaki 3

Gymnasium of the Senior High Division of Shenzhen Foreign Languages School, Shenzhen
Referees: Boris Schmidt (GER)

August 16, 2011
20:30

Report

Russia	53–45	Poland
Scoring by quarter: 14-7, 15-18, 8-11, 16-9
Pts: Myasoedova 11; Rebs: Cherepanova 11; Asts: Cherepanova, Vieru 2		Pts: Trebicka, Skobel 11; Rebs: Skobel 6 Asts: no assists

Gymnasium of Pingshan Sports Center, Shenzhen
Referees: Robert Paulik (CZE)

=== Classification 9th-16th Place ===
August 18, 2011
10:00

Report

Poland	66–73	Japan
Scoring by quarter: 22–15, 11–22, 13–19, 20–17
Pts: Kaczmarczyk 23; Rebs: Kaczmarczyk 16; Asts: Pietrzak 4		Pts: Shinozaki 19; Rebs: Shinozaki 8 Asts: five players 2

Gymnasium of Pingshan Sports Center, Shenzhen
Referees: Nadine Renée Crowley (CAN)

==== Classification 13th-16th Place ====
August 19, 2011
10:00

Report

Slovakia	53–45	Poland
Scoring by quarter: 14–10, 14–9, 13–12, 12–14
Pts: Kmetova 11; Rebs: Tetemondová 11; Asts: Pindrochnova, Kmetova 1		Pts: Skobel 17; Rebs: Antczak 6 Asts: Durak 3

Main Gymnasium of Universiade Center, Shenzhen
Referees: Liu Wei (CHN)

== Volleyball ==
Poland qualified a women's team.

=== Group C ===
Pos	Team	Pld	W	L	Pts	SW	SL	SR	SPW	SPL	SPR
1	Poland	3	3	0	6	9	0	MAX	228	180	1.267
2	Chinese Taipei	3	2	1	5	6	5	1.200	258	250	1.032
3	Canada	3	1	2	4	4	7	0.571	238	265	0.898
4	France	3	0	3	3	2	9	0.222	235	264	0.890

Date		Score		Set 1	Set 2	Set 3	Set 4	Set 5	Total
14 August	Poland	3–0	Canada	25–19	25–17	28–26			78–62
15 August	Poland	3–0	France	25–23	25–20	25–16			75–59
16 August	Chinese Taipei	0–3	Poland	16–25	21–25	22–25			59–75

== Quarterfinals ==
Date		Score		Set 1	Set 2	Set 3	Set 4	Set 5	Total
18 August	Poland	1–3	Japan	21–25	16–25	26–24	27–29		90–103

=== Classification 5-8 places ===
Date		Score		Set 1	Set 2	Set 3	Set 4	Set 5	Total
19 August	Poland	3–0	Thailand	25–22	25–14	25–18			75–54

=== Final 5-6 places ===
Date		Score		Set 1	Set 2	Set 3	Set 4	Set 5	Total
20 August	Poland	3-2	Ukraine	26–28	25–11	25–14	18–25	15–13	109–91
