= Matīss Burģis =

Latvian table tennis player (born 1989)

Personal information
- Nationality: Latvia
- Born: 31 August 1989 (age 36): Priekule, Latvian SSR, USSR; (now Latvia)

Sport
- Sport: Table tennis

Matīss Burģis (born 31 August 1989) is a Latvian table tennis player. He represented Latvia at 2012 Summer Olympics, reaching the second round. Burģis was the first Latvian table tennis player who competed at Olympics. He was born in Priekule, Latvia.
