= Colin Smith (sailor) =

Hong Kong sailor (1928–2018)

Personal information
- Nationality: Hong Konger
- Born: 15 September 1928; Adelaide, Australia
- Died: September 2018 (aged 89–90)

Sport
- Sport: Sailing

Colin Smith (15 September 1928 – September 2018) was a Hong Kong sailor. He competed in the Flying Dutchman event at the 1972 Summer Olympics.
