= Hong Kong at the 2011 Summer Universiade =

- IOC code: HKG
- Competitors: 36 in 2 sports
- Medals: Gold 0 Silver 0 Bronze 3 Total 3

Summer Universiade appearances
- 1959; 1961; 1963; 1965; 1967; 1970; 1973; 1975; 1977; 1979; 1981; 1983; 1985; 1987; 1989; 1991; 1993; 1995; 1997; 1999; 2001; 2003; 2005; 2007; 2009; 2011; 2013; 2015; 2017; 2019; 2021; 2025; 2027

Hong Kong competed at the 2011 Summer Universiade in Shenzhen, China.

== Basketball ==
Hong Kong has qualified a men's team.

== Gymnastics ==
Wong Hiu Ying Angel has qualified into individual all-around final at 22nd place and vault final at 3rd place. In the individual all-around final, Wong finished 15th with a total score of 48.350. In the vault final, Wong won a bronze medal with an average score of 13.650.

Ng Kiu Chung finished 69th in the preliminary round and did not advance into any final.

== Volleyball ==
Hong Kong has qualified both a men's and a women's team.
