= Vietnam at the 2011 Summer Universiade =

- IOC code: VIE

in Shenzhen
- Competitors: 36 in 4 sports
- Medals Ranked 47th: Gold 0 Silver 1 Bronze 3 Total 4

Summer Universiade appearances
- 1959; 1961; 1963; 1965; 1967; 1970; 1973; 1975; 1977; 1979; 1981; 1983; 1985; 1987; 1989; 1991; 1993; 1995; 1997; 1999; 2001; 2003; 2005; 2007; 2009; 2011; 2013; 2015; 2017; 2019; 2021; 2025; 2027

Vietnam competed at the 2011 Summer Universiade in Shenzhen, China in four sports: athletics, gymnastics, table tennis, and taekwondo.

== Medalists ==
Medal	Name	Sport	Event
Silver	Nguyen Thi Thu Ngan; Le Hieu Nghia	Taekwondo	Mixed events
Bronze	Nguyen Thi Le Kim; Chau Tuyet Van; Nguyen Thi Thu Ngan	Taekwondo	Women's Team Poomsae
Bronze	Le Trung Anh; Le Hieu Nghia; Nguyen Dinh Toan	Taekwondo	Men's Team Poomsae
Bronze	Nguyen Dinh Toan	Taekwondo	Men's Individual Poomsae
