= 2011 Summer Universiade =

Multi-sport event in Shenzhen, China

XXVI Summer Universiade
- Host city: Shenzhen, Guangdong, China
- Motto: Start Here (从这里开始, Cóng zhèlǐ kāishǐ)
- Nations: 151
- Athletes: 7,132
- Events: 304 in 22 sports
- Opening: 12 August 2011
- Closing: 23 August 2011
- Opened by: President Hu Jintao
- Main venue: Shenzhen Bay Sports Center
- Website: sz2011.org (archived)

Summer

Winter

The 2011 Summer Universiade (2011年夏季世界大学生运动会), also known as the XXVI Summer Universiade (第二十六届夏季世界大学生运动会) and Shenzhen 2011, was an international multi-sport event for university athletes held in Shenzhen, Guangdong, China.

== Bid selection ==
The cities of Kazan (Russia), Kaohsiung (Chinese Taipei), Shenzhen (China), Murcia (Spain), and Poznań (Poland), were in contention to host the Games. On 16 January 2007, FISU announced at the conference prior to the 2007 Winter Universiade, that the host would be Shenzhen. With five candidates, it was the most competitive race to host a Universiade until that date. Edmonton, Alberta, Canada was also posed to make a serious bid, but withdrew.

Shenzhen was not considered a favorite, as several other sporting competitions have been assigned to China in recent years, including the 2008 Summer Olympics in Beijing, the 2009 Winter Universiade in Harbin, and the 2010 Asian Games in Guangzhou. Also, as a city, Shenzhen was only 30 years old as of 2010 and lacked experience in hosting a major sporting competition, compared to the other candidates.

== Preparation ==
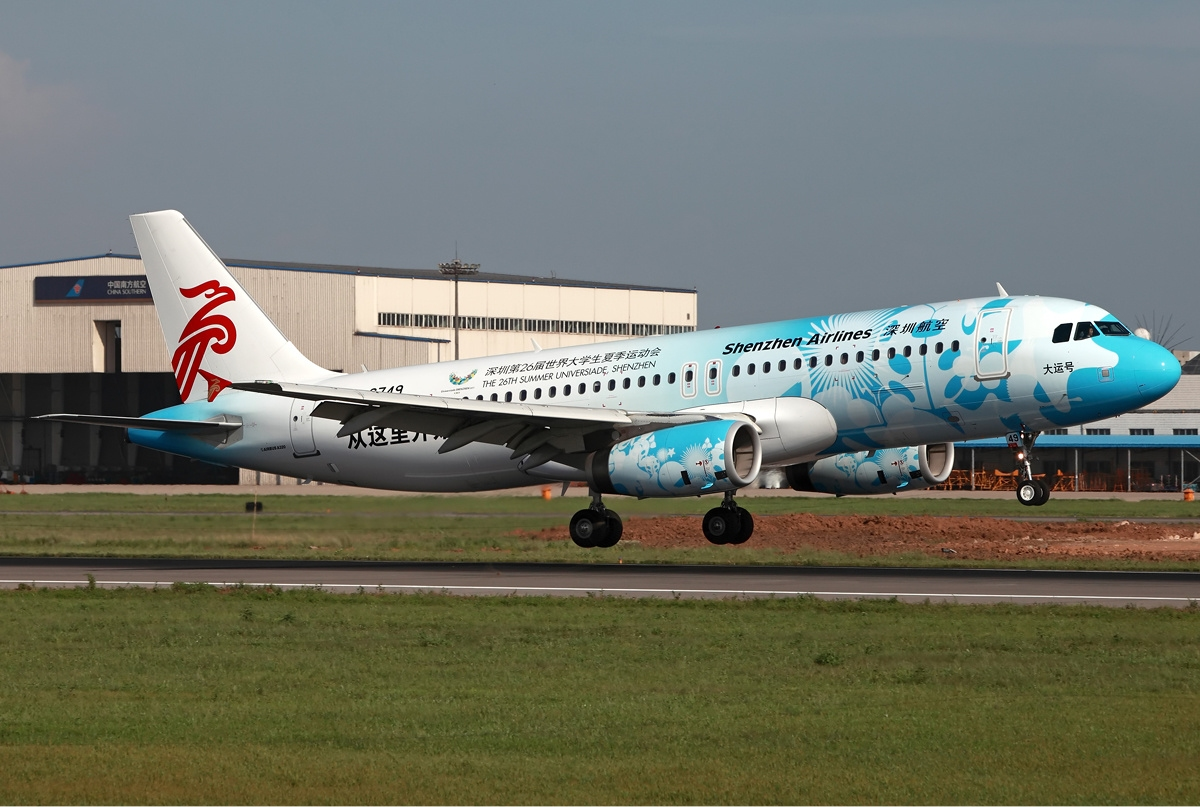
Shenzhen Airlines was an official partner of the Universiade. Here, one of its Airbus A320s is painted in a livery that promotes the games.

In preparation for the event, Shenzhen built numerous infrastructure objects, including several new lines of Shenzhen Metro. The preparation cost was estimated to exceed 180 billion RMB, including 75 billion RMB spent on new subway lines, 12 billion RMB on facelifting buildings and streets and 4.1 billion RMB spent on the 60,000-seat stadium.

Also added were 200 of BYD's all-electric eBUS's and 300 of BYD's all-electric e6's (a 5-passenger sedan that serves well as an eTaxi), making this new-energy fleet the largest of its kind in the world.

After the conclusion of the event, the eBUSs and eTaxis continued serving as public transportation for Shenzhen City.

On the down side, 80,000 residents were evicted from the city for reasons such as lack of regular employment because they were deemed a 'threat' to the Universiade. The move was highly controversial and sparked a debate on the legality of the policy.

Residents of apartment buildings close to the stadium were ordered to leave their houses for five hours but to leave the lights on. 15,000 paramilitary police from other cities were deployed in Shenzhen, in addition to Shenzhen's own 5,000-strong force.

Shenzhen Airport was ordered closed during the opening ceremony, affecting up to 290 flights.

According to the head of Shenzhen's Communist Party division, Wang Rong, all this was done to prevent the embarrassment of China in front of the world, as many foreigners were to be present in the city during the Games.

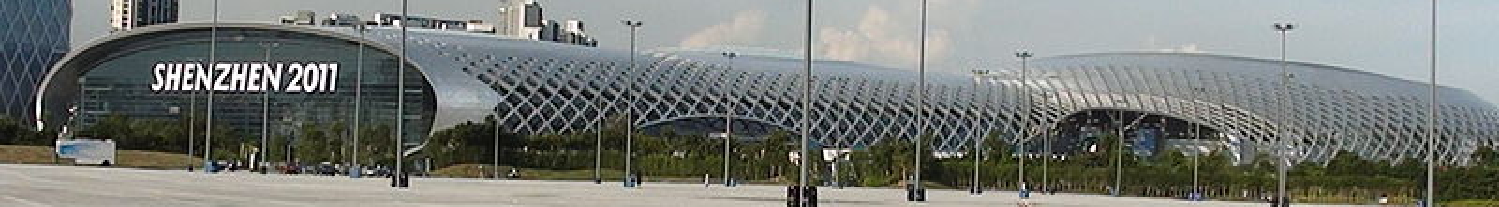
The Stadium of the opening ceremony: Shenzhen Bay Sports Center

== Mascot ==
The mascot of the 2011 Summer Universiade is called UU. Its design is related to the logo of the Universiade, the Happy U. It represents a smiling face, with the image of the first letter "U" in the word "Universiade". Its relationship with the logo, the "Happy U" breaks the traditional mascot design idea to be realistic, and comforts the spirit of the Universiade.

== Tickets ==
Delegations could obtain complimentary tickets before 23 May. As of 24 May, 80 days away from the opening ceremony, the ticket sale has not yet started. It was announced that tickets would cost between 30 and 300 RMB. In July 2011, tickets went on sale to the general public in several phases. Tickets for the opening and closing ceremonies would not be sold to the general public.

== Venues ==
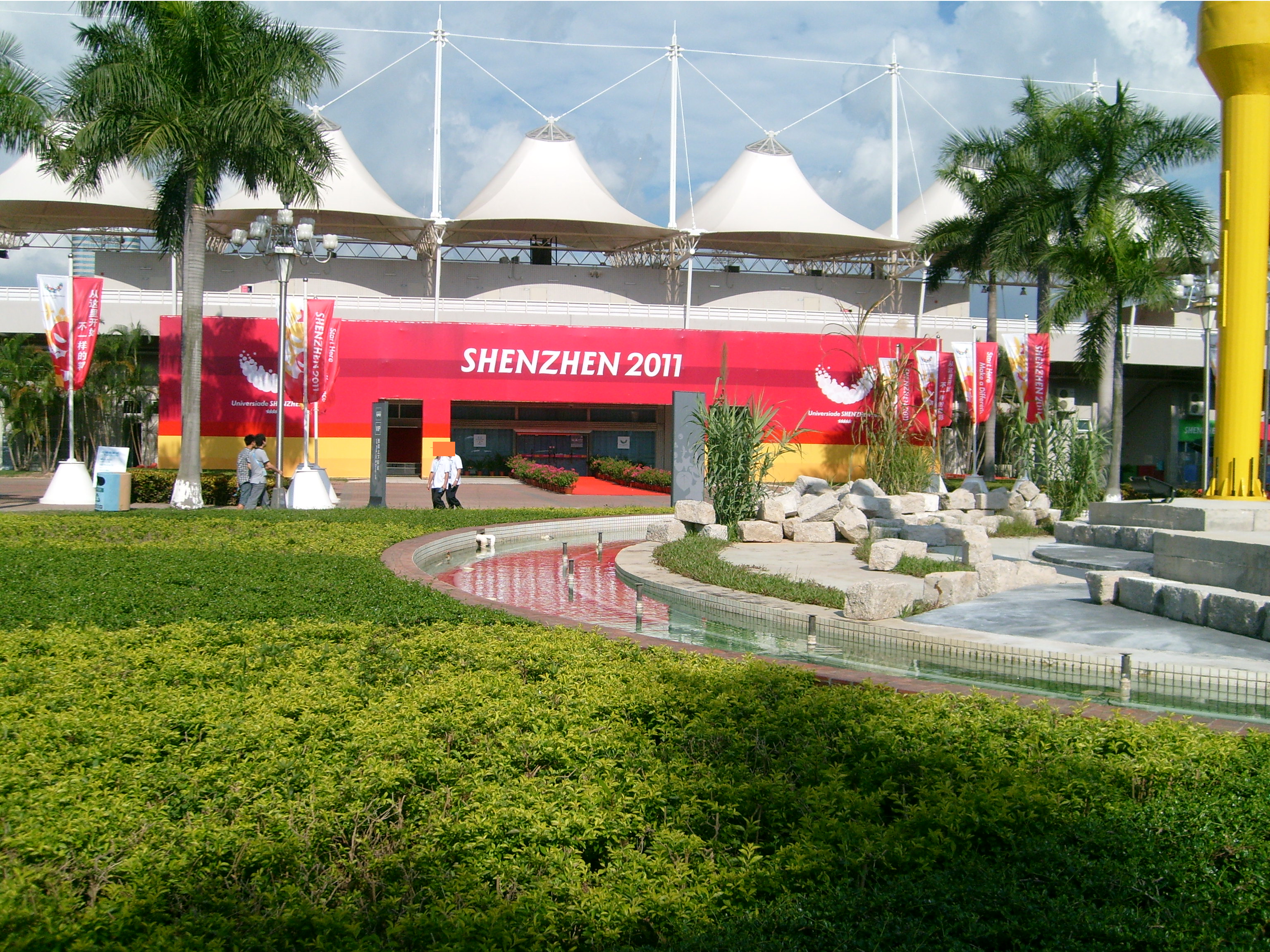
Shenzhen University Stadium

During the bid process promised the city would build 12 new venues in the Futian, Nanshan and Luohu districts. A new International Olympic Centre featuring a 60,000-seat main stadium, an 18,000-seat gym, a 13.4-square-kilometre park and other facilities, also was established in Longgang District. By the end, 21 new venues and stadiums were successfully completed.

The 2011 Summer Universiade used 54 stadiums including 29 competition halls and 25 training halls. Avant company is the only sports seating facility supplier.

The Universiade including Universiade 2011 Shenzhen Sports Center, Shenzhen Sports Center-natatorium, Shenzhen Stadium, Sports City, Shenzhen Gym, Shenzhen natatorium, Shenzhen Sports Team Training Hall, Longgang International Velodrome, Luohu Gym, Bao'an Sports Center, Nanshan Recreation and Sports Activities Center, Shenzhen University Gym, etc.

The main gymnasium of Universiade Center has an area of 45,000 square meters and 4 layers, allowing more than 18,000 spectators to watch matches. Many basketball matches and championships were held here, so it satisfied all standards and specifications of FIBA. Stands were constructed around the whole basketball gymnasium.

- Shenzhen Swimming and Diving Gym – Diving
- Universiade Center Aquatic Center – Swimming
- Bao'an Natatorium – Water polo
- Seven Star Bay – Open Water Swimming, Sailing
- Shenwanyi Road Football Pitch – Archery
- New Shenzhen Stadium – Athletics, Football
- Roads of Longgang – Athletics
- Shenzhen Institute of Information Technology gym – Badminton
- Universiade Sports Center Main Arena – Basketball
- Gymnasium of Pingshan Sports Center – Basketball
- Shenzhen Luohu Gymnasium – Basketball
- Gymnasium of the Senior High Division of Shenzhen Foreign Languages School – Basketball
- Dameisha Park – Beach Volleyball
- Shenzhen Conference and Exhibition Center – Chess, Fencing, Judo, Taekwondo
- Longgang Sports Center – Cycling
- Bao'an Xixiang Sports Center – Football
- Shenzhen Sports School – Football, Weightlifting
- Shenzhen University Town – Football
- Bao'an Stadium – Football
- Shenzhen Institute of Information Technology Stadium – Football
- Mission Hills Golf Club – Golf
- Bao'an District Gym – Gymnastics
- Futian Sports Park Gym – Gymnastics
- Shenzhen Maritime Sports Base & Sailing School – Sailing
- Shenzhen Shooting Hall and Clay-pigeon Shooting Field – Shooting
- Shenzhen Bay Sports Center – Table tennis
- Longgang Tennis Center – Tennis
- Shenzhen Tennis Center – Tennis
- Shenzhen Gymnasium – Volleyball

== Sports ==
Following is a list of the sports that were contested at the 2011 Summer Universiade:

- Aquatics
  - Diving (12)
  - Marathon swimming (2)
  - Swimming (40)
  - Water polo (2)
- Archery (10)
- Athletics (50)
- Badminton (6)
- Basketball (2)
- Beach volleyball (2)
- Chess (3)
- Cycling
  - BMX racing (2)
  - Mountain biking (2)
  - Road (4)
  - Track (8)
- Fencing (12)
- Football (2)
- Gymnastics
  - Aerobics (6)
  - Artistic Gymnastics (14)
  - Rhythmic Gymnastics (8)
- Golf (4)
- Judo (18)
- Sailing (8)
- Shooting (34)
- Table tennis (7)
- Taekwondo (21)
- Tennis (7)
- Volleyball (2)
- Weightlifting (15)

== Participants ==
150 countries participated in 2011 Summer Universiade.

- Afghanistan (1)
- Albania
- Algeria
- Angola
- Anguilla
- Argentina
- Armenia
- Aruba
- Australia (156)
- Austria
- Azerbaijan
- Bangladesh
- Barbados
- Belarus
- Belgium
- Benin
- Bolivia
- Bosnia and Herzegovina
- Botswana
- Brazil
- Bulgaria
- Burkina Faso
- Burundi
- Cambodia
- Cameroon
- Canada (246)
- Central African Republic
- Chad
- Chile
- China (505) (host)
- Chinese Taipei
- Colombia
- Comoros
- Republic of the Congo
- Cook Islands
- Costa Rica
- Ivory Coast
- Croatia
- Cuba
- Cyprus
- Czech Republic
- Democratic Republic of the Congo
- Denmark
- Dominican Republic
- Ecuador
- Egypt
- El Salvador
- Estonia (79)
- Ethiopia
- Fiji
- Finland
- France (200)
- Gabon
- Georgia (20)
- Germany
- Ghana
- Great Britain
- Greece
- Guatemala
- Guinea
- Guyana
- Haiti (8)
- Honduras
- Hong Kong
- Hungary (103)
- India
- Indonesia (54)
- Iran
- Iraq
- Ireland
- Israel (64)
- Italy
- Jamaica
- Japan
- Jordan
- Kazakhstan
- Kenya
- North Korea
- South Korea
- Kuwait
- Kyrgyzstan
- Latvia
- Lebanon
- Lesotho
- Liechtenstein
- Lithuania (90)
- Luxembourg
- Macau
- Macedonia
- Madagascar
- Malawi
- Malaysia (152)
- Mali
- Mexico
- Federated States of Micronesia
- Moldova
- Mongolia (157)
- Montenegro
- Morocco
- Mozambique
- Namibia
- Nepal
- Netherlands
- Netherlands Antilles
- New Zealand
- Nicaragua
- Niger
- Nigeria
- Northern Mariana Islands
- Norway
- Oman
- Pakistan
- Palestine
- Panama
- Paraguay (4)
- Peru
- Philippines (58)
- Poland (150)
- Portugal (32)
- Puerto Rico (no participant)
- Romania (64)
- Russia (476)
- Samoa (1)
- Saudi Arabia
- Senegal
- Serbia (31)
- Singapore
- Slovakia
- Slovenia (34)
- South Africa
- Spain
- Sri Lanka (55)
- Sudan
- Suriname
- Swaziland
- Sweden (70)
- Switzerland (93)
- Syria
- Tajikistan
- Tanzania
- Thailand
- Togo
- Turkey (81)
- Uganda
- Ukraine (293)
- United Arab Emirates
- United States
- Uruguay (21)
- Uzbekistan
- Vietnam
- Virgin Islands
- Zambia
- Zimbabwe

== Medal table ==
The medal count is as follows:

* Host nation (China)

Rank	Nation	Gold	Silver	Bronze	Total
1	China*	74	40	32	146
2	Russia	42	43	45	130
3	South Korea	28	21	30	79
4	Japan	23	26	38	87
5	United States	17	22	12	51
6	Ukraine	12	19	14	45
7	Italy	12	5	13	30
8	Chinese Taipei (TPE)	7	9	16	32
9	Thailand	7	2	9	18
10	Turkey	6	7	8	21
11	Jamaica	6	2	1	9
12	Hungary	6	1	4	11
13	Poland	5	7	8	20
14	Lithuania	5	5	3	13
15	Australia	5	3	8	16
16	New Zealand	5	3	4	12
17	France	4	12	17	33
18	Romania	3	4	9	16
19	Belarus	3	4	6	13
20	Indonesia	3	1	2	6
21	Germany	2	7	6	15
22	Spain	2	5	5	12
23	Brazil	2	4	13	19
24	South Africa	2	2	3	7
25	North Korea	2	2	1	5
26	Portugal	2	2	0	4
26	Serbia	2	2	0	4
28	Czech Republic	2	1	4	7
29	Great Britain	2	1	2	5
30	India	2	0	1	3
31	Netherlands	2	0	0	2
32	Mexico	1	4	12	17
33	Iran	1	4	3	8
34	Switzerland	1	3	1	5
35	Slovakia	1	2	0	3
36	Morocco	1	1	2	4
37	Algeria	1	1	1	3
37	Estonia	1	1	1	3
39	Armenia	1	0	1	2
39	Moldova	1	0	1	2
41	Croatia	1	0	0	1
42	Canada	0	5	3	8
43	Mongolia	0	4	0	4
44	Kazakhstan	0	3	4	7
45	Azerbaijan	0	2	0	2
46	Vietnam	0	1	3	4
47	Malaysia (MAS)	0	1	2	3
48	Austria	0	1	1	2
48	Belgium	0	1	1	2
50	Ecuador	0	1	0	1
50	Israel	0	1	0	1
50	Philippines	0	1	0	1
50	Singapore	0	1	0	1
50	Slovenia	0	1	0	1
50	Uzbekistan	0	1	0	1
56	Hong Kong	0	0	3	3
57	Cyprus	0	0	2	2
57	Egypt	0	0	2	2
59	Cuba	0	0	1	1
59	Georgia	0	0	1	1
59	Greece	0	0	1	1
59	Kenya	0	0	1	1
59	Macedonia	0	0	1	1
59	Mozambique	0	0	1	1
59	Sweden	0	0	1	1
Totals (65 entries)		305	302	364	971

== Schedule ==
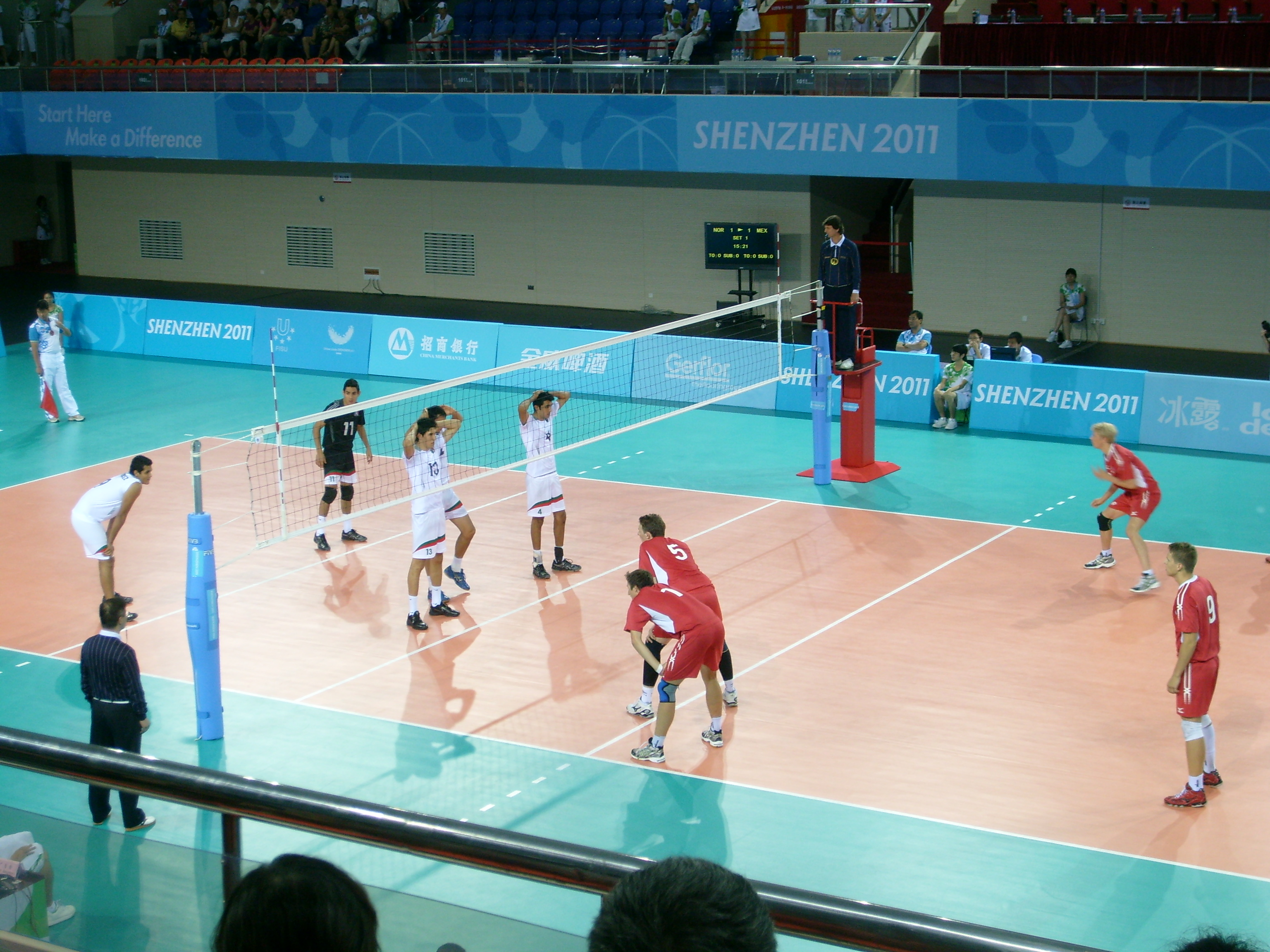
One of volleyball events: Norway vs Mexico (20 August)

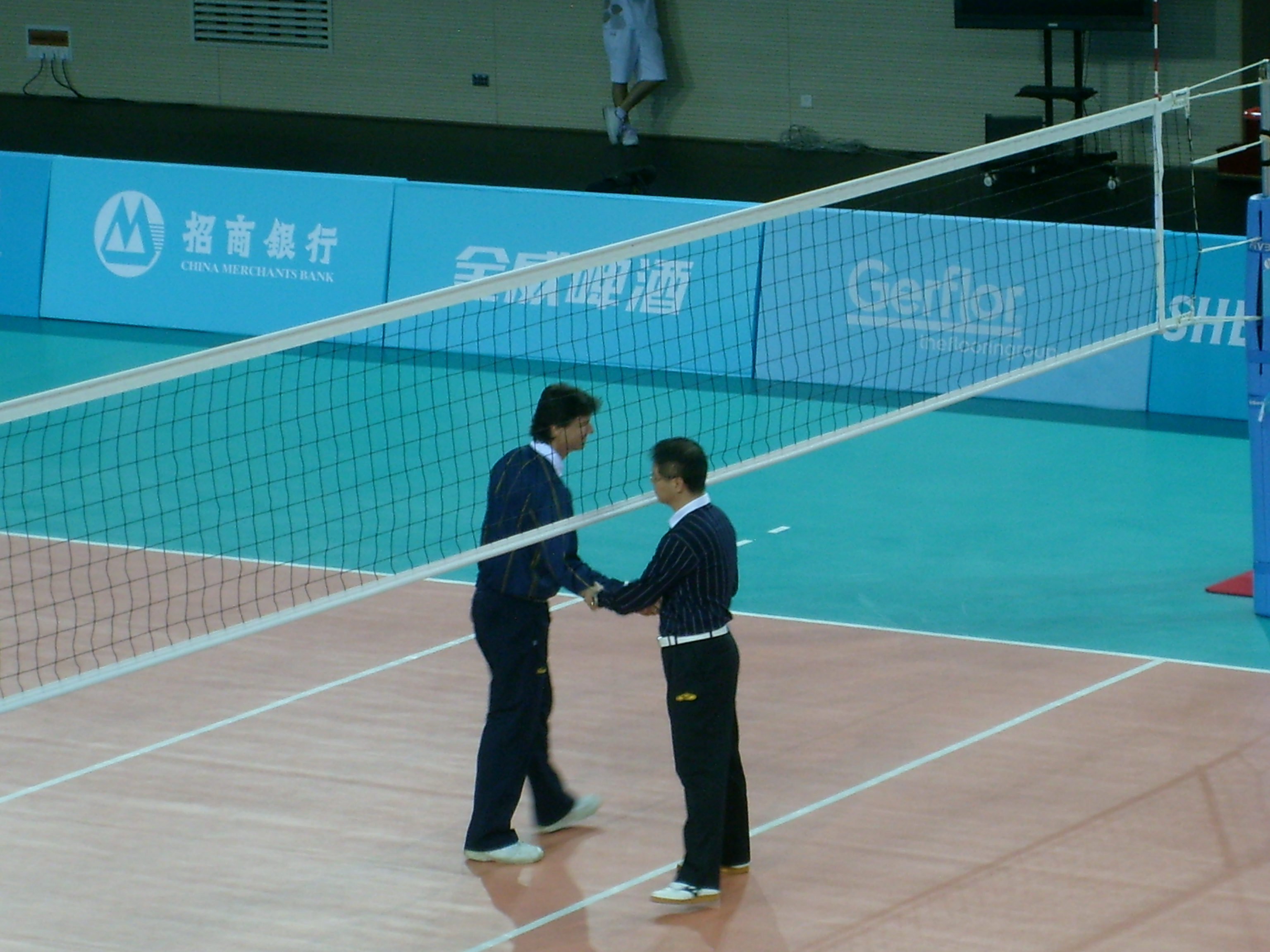
Australian and Hong Kong referees for volleyball event of Norway vs Mexico (20 August)

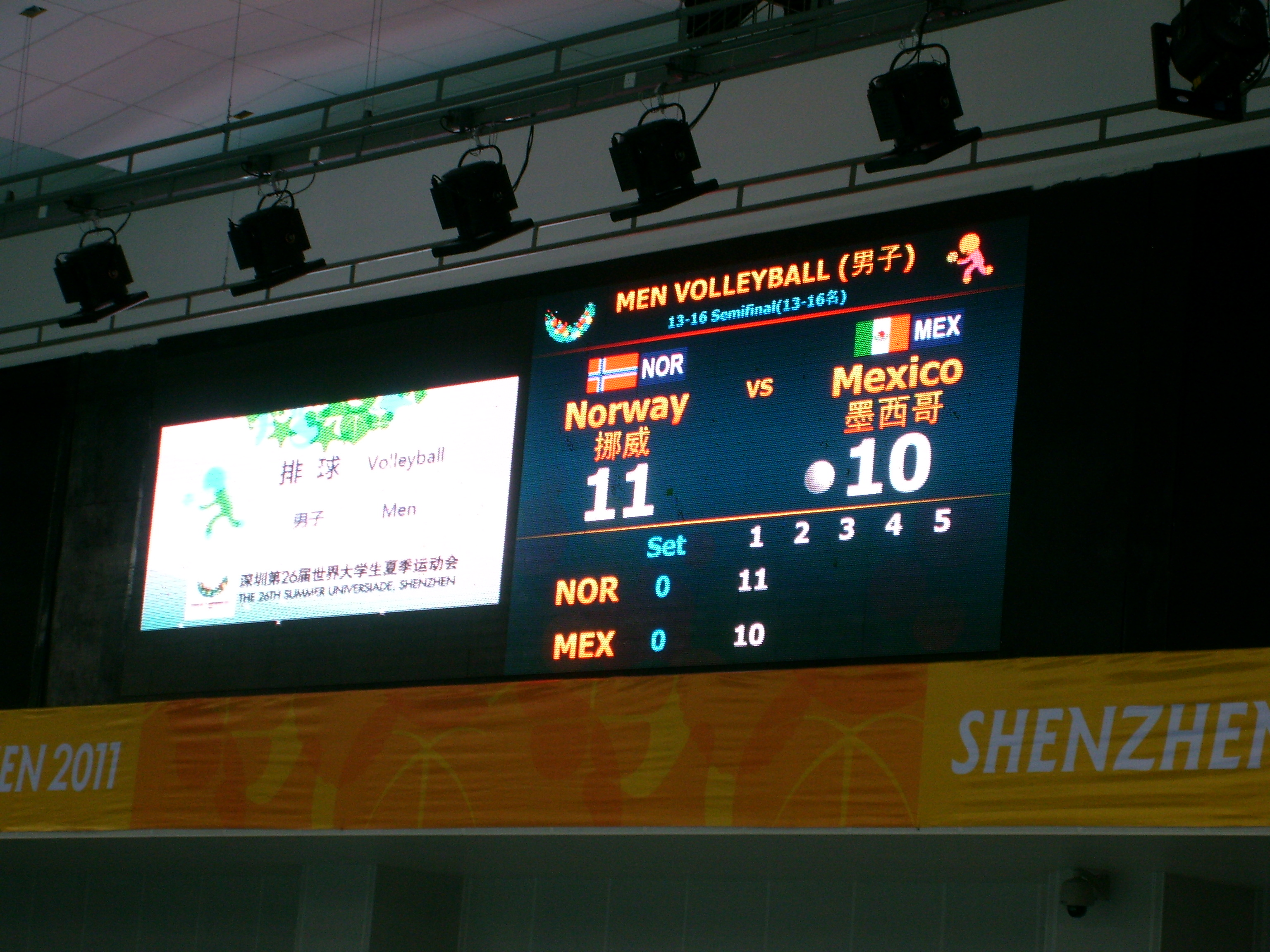
Score Monitor in Shenzhen University Gym (20 August)

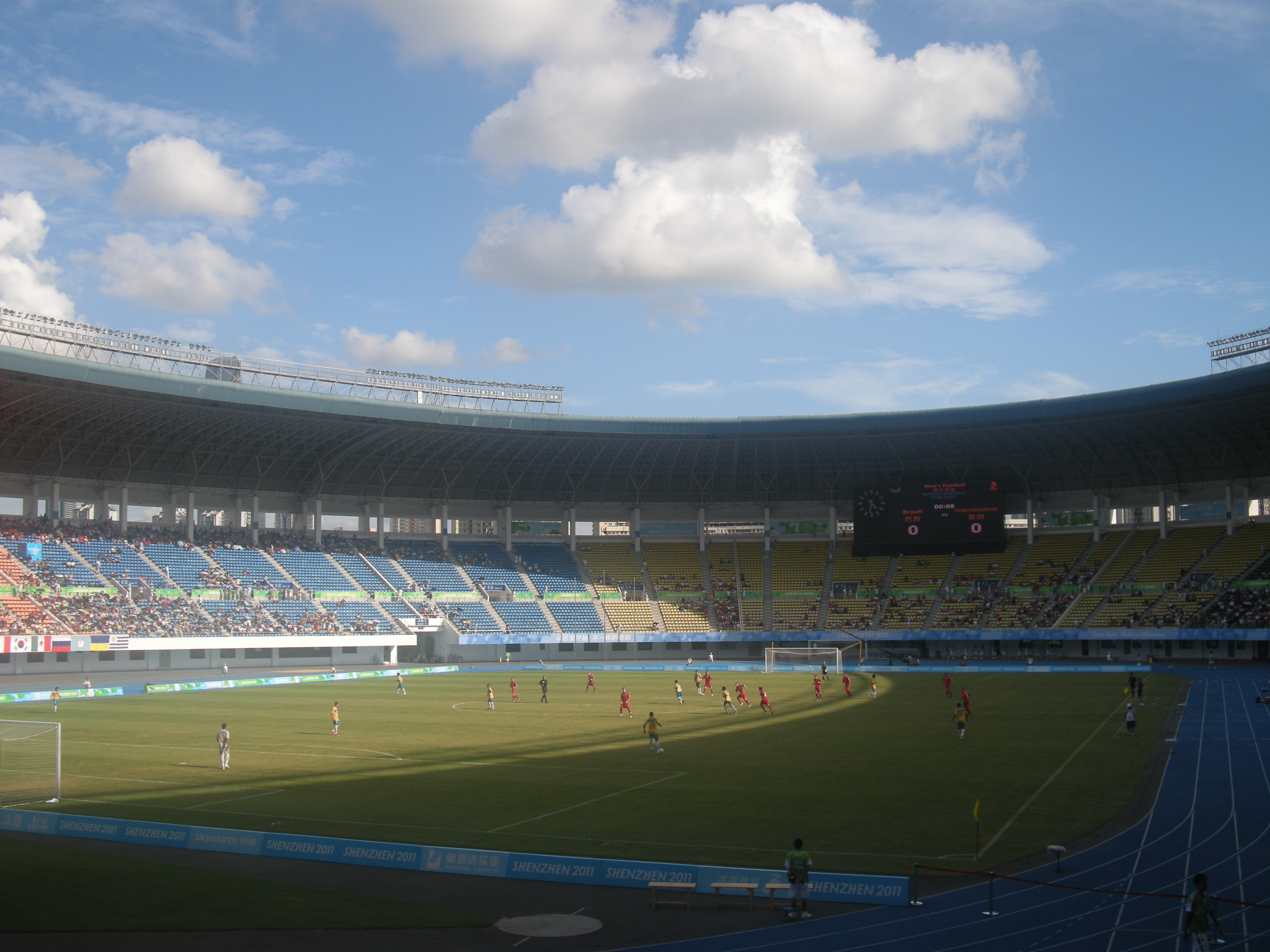
One of football events: Brazil vs UK

OC	Opening ceremony	●	Event competitions	1	Event finals	CC	Closing ceremony

August	11th Thu	12th Fri	13th Sat	14th Sun	15th Mon	16th Tue	17th Wed	18th Thu	19th Fri	20th Sat	21st Sun	22nd Mon	23rd Tue	Events
Ceremonies		OC											CC	
Archery				●	●	2	2	8						10
Athletics						2	6	11	10	7	14			50
Badminton						●	●	1	●	●	●	5		6
Basketball			●	●	●	●	●	●	●	●	1	1		2
Beach volleyball			●	●	●	●	●	1	1					2
Chess					●	●	●	●	●	●	3			3
Cycling			2	2	2	1	2	3	2	2				16
Diving						2	1	1	2	1	1	4		12
Fencing			2	2	2	2	2	2						12
Football	●		●	●	●	●	●	●	●	●	1	1		2
Gymnastics			1	1	2	10				2	4	8		28
Golf							●	●	●	4				4
Judo			4	4	4	4	2							18
Sailing						●	●	●	●	3	6			9
Shooting								8	6	8	4	10		36
Swimming			2	6	7	7	7	7	6					42
Table tennis			●	●	●	2	●	1	2	2				7
Taekwondo								2	3	4	4	4	4	21
Tennis				●	●	●	●	●	●	2	5			7
Volleyball		●	●	●	●	●	●	●	●	1	1			2
Water polo	●	●	●	●	●	●	●	●	●	●	●	1	1	2
Weightlifting			2	2	3	2	3	3						15
Total events			13	17	20	34	28	45	32	37	40	35	5	306
Cumulative total			13	30	50	84	112	157	189	226	266	301	306	
August	11th Thu	12th Fri	13th Sat	14th Sun	15th Mon	16th Tue	17th Wed	18th Thu	19th Fri	20th Sat	21st Sun	22nd Mon	23rd Tue	Events

== See also ==
- Sports in China
