= Lohatla =

South African military training area

Coordinates: 28.0280°S 23.1077°E

South African Army Combat Training Centre
- Postmasburg, Northern Cape province, [South Africa]
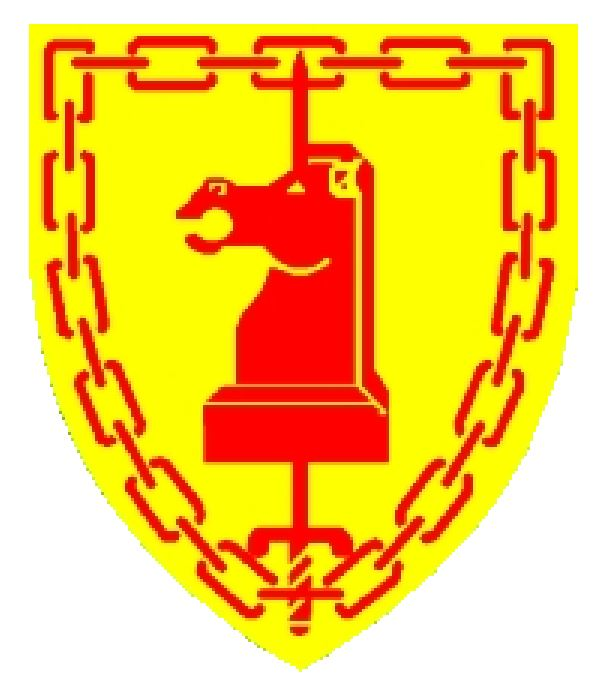
- SANDF Army Training Combat Centre emblem

Site information
- Type: Military Training Area
- Owner: Department of Defence
- Controlled by: South African Army
- Condition: In use

Location
- Lohatla (Northern Cape)
- Area: 158,000 hectares or 1,580km^2

Site history
- Built: 1978
- In use: 1978 – present

Garrison information
- Current commander: Brigadier General Manyonyo Mofokeng

Lohatla is a training area of the South African National Defence Force. It is located in the Northern Cape province of South Africa and is home to the SA Army Combat Training Centre, (Note: Previously known as Lohatla Army Battle School) which is part of the South African Army Training Formation.

== Capability ==
The SA Army Combat Training Centre is unique in the sense that it is one of only ten such institutions in the world that provide exclusive and permanent facilities for landward warfare training. Only two of these institutions are located in the Southern hemisphere, of which the SA Army Combat Training Centre is the largest, 150,000 hectares (370,000 acres) in total.}

== History ==
This military training institution was founded on 15 January 1978 and was known as the South African Army Battle School.

The Battle School originated due to a need by the Department of Defence for a military training facility where conventional and integrated training on divisional level could be executed.

=== Nature Reserve ===
The Ga-Thlose Nature Reserve was proclaimed in 1890 and was managed as its domain by Agricultural Credit. Ownership by the local population was denied through a proclamation in 1976 and the Reserve was proclaimed a restricted military area. The local population living in the area were to be relocated in the passage of time. In the meantime it was agreed that the specific group of the local community could graze their cattle in the designated grazing areas. The movement to Ga-Thlose from the Sishen Gate was also permitted.

=== Area enlarged ===
The purchase of farms east and south of the above-mentioned area was completed in 1981 and the area, as a whole, was proclaimed as a restricted military area. The infrastructure taken over from the farmers was in a good condition.

=== Permanent in house units ===
During the early nineties, nine self accounting units were permanently based on the terrain:

- 61 Mechanised Battalion Group, (currently integrated into 8 SAI at Upington)
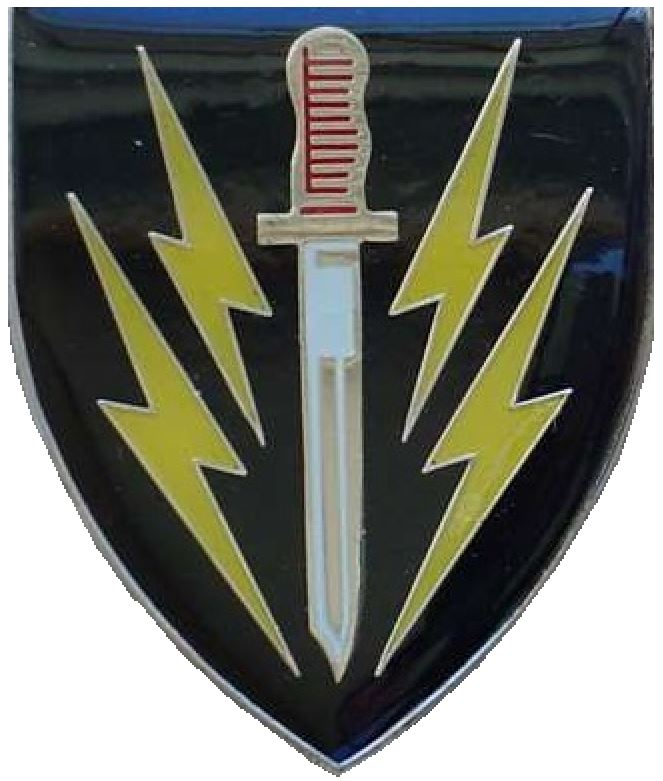
  61 Mech Battalion
- Training Group,
- HQ Unit,
- 12 Field Engineers Regiment,
- 8 Signals Group,
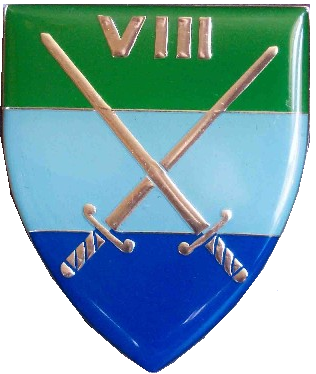
  8 Signals badge
- 101 Works Unit,
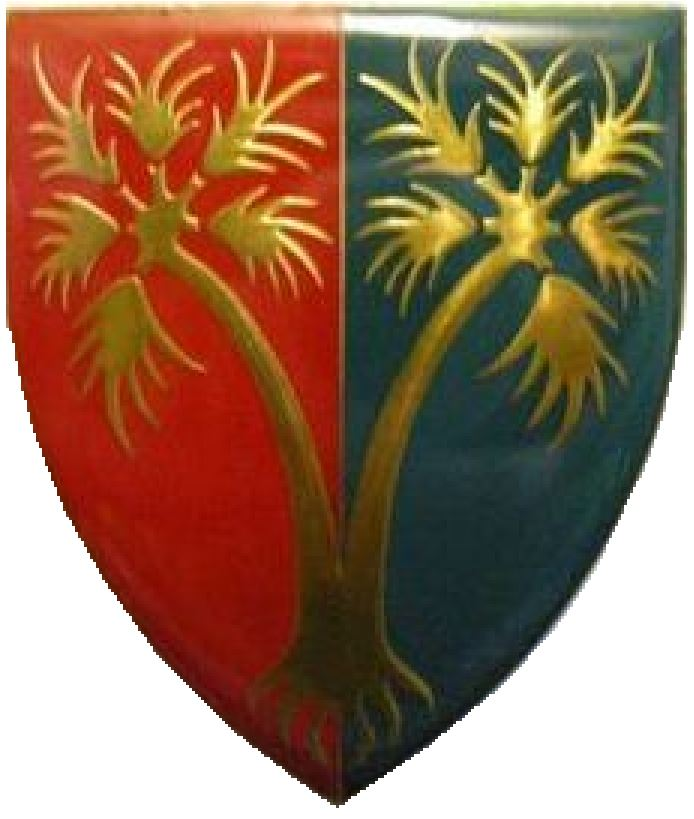
  101 Workshop
- 16 Maintenance Unit, (reactivated on 25 September 1992 at Lohatla. Up to 2000, 16 Maintenance was the 2nd line support institution to forces participating in exercises and provided day to day support to the School. Since then the unit has developed as a Combat Zone Maintenance Unit)
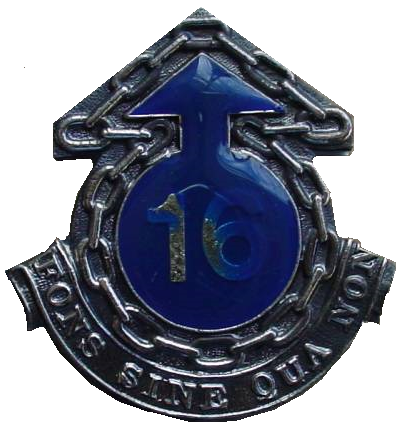
  16 Maintenance Unit beret badge
- 8 Division Mobilisation Unit and
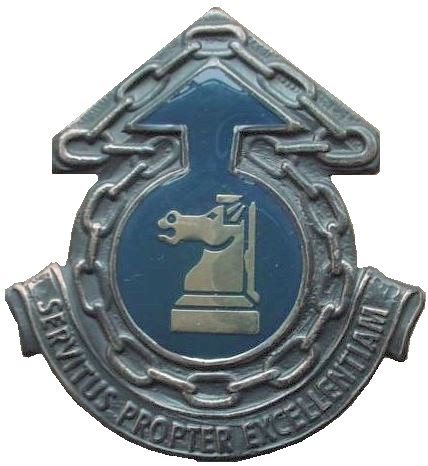
  8 Division Mobilization Unit transferred to Lohatla Army Battle School but eventually became the Rapid Deployment Force Mobilisation Unit

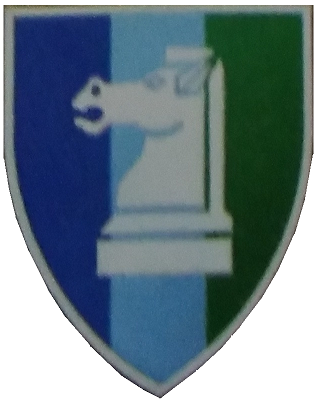
Lohatla Signals unit shoulder flash

- a Provost Unit
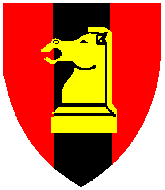
  Lohatla Provost Unit

A Forward Air Command Post and Medical Command Post helped to integrate elements from the Air Force and Medical Service.

Forward Air Command Post Lohatla

==== 60 Brigade ====
Stemming from a reorganisation at Oshivello in 1989 from the 'ABS Rapid Deployment Force', an operational mechanised Brigade called 60 Brigade managing 61, 62 (placeholder battalion based on 4 SAI) and 63 (placeholder battalion based on 8 SAI) mechanised battalions as a joint entity was briefly housed at Lohatla from 1989 to 1994. This Brigade was primarily aimed at planning readiness for a conventional mechanised war and based on lessons learned from Operation Merlyn.

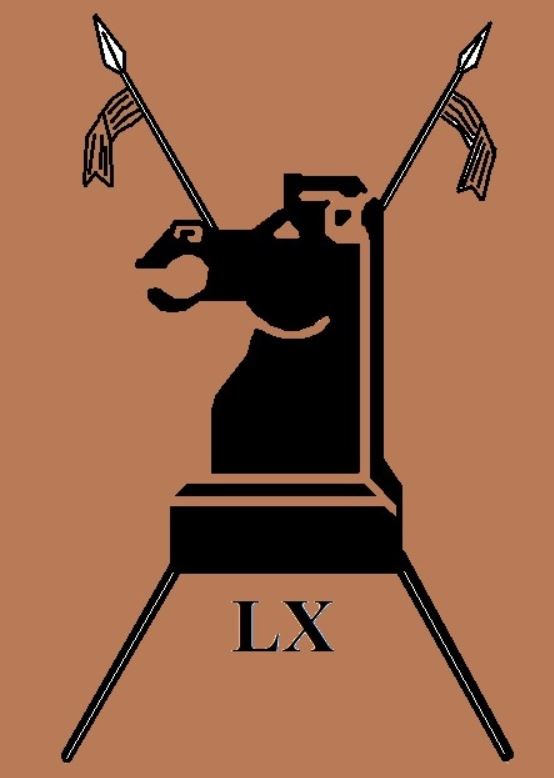
SADF era 60 Brigade logo

=== Visiting Units ===
Each unit visiting for training is accommodated in one of thirteen unit lines which has tank paving, maintenance areas and stores.

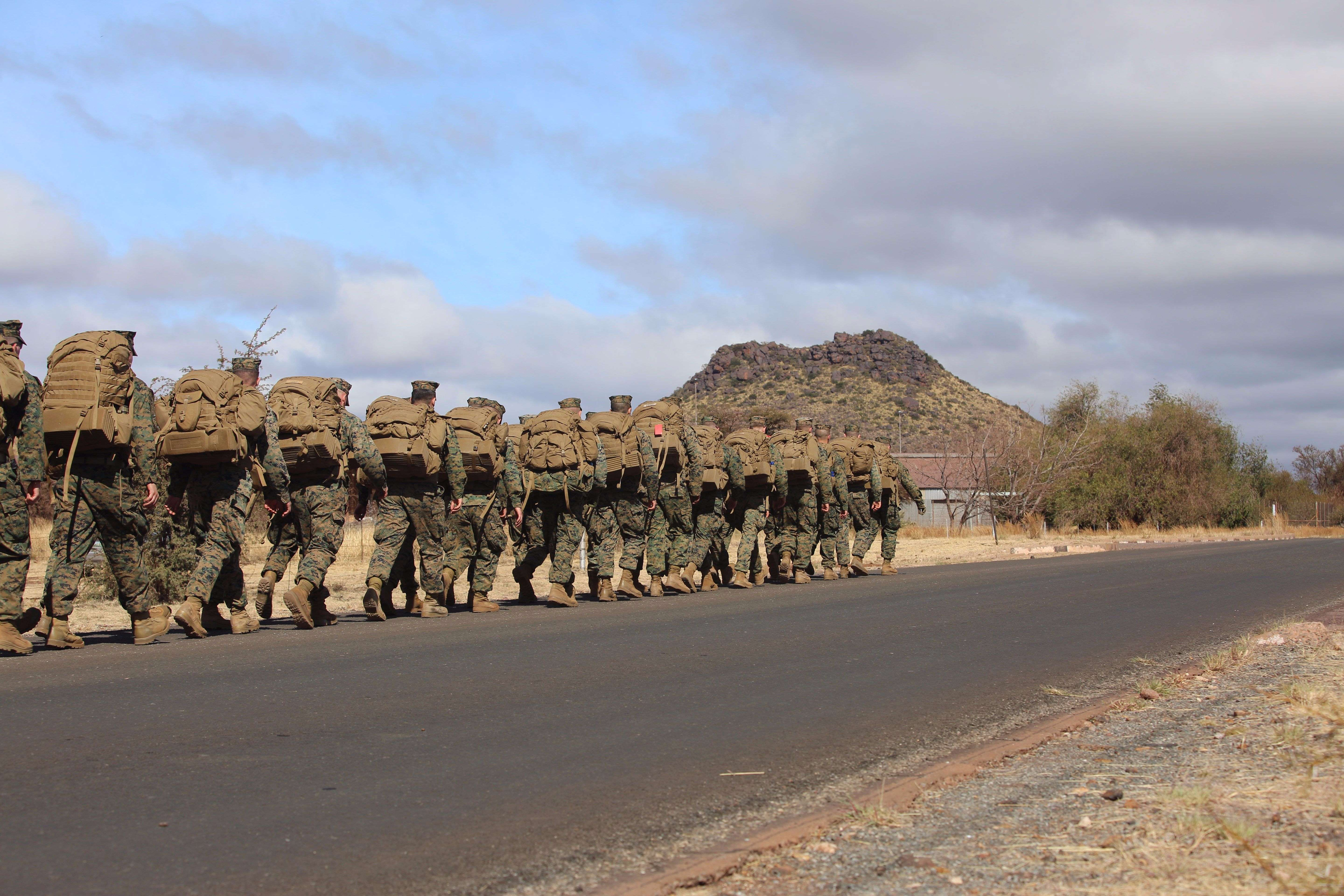
Shared Accord 17

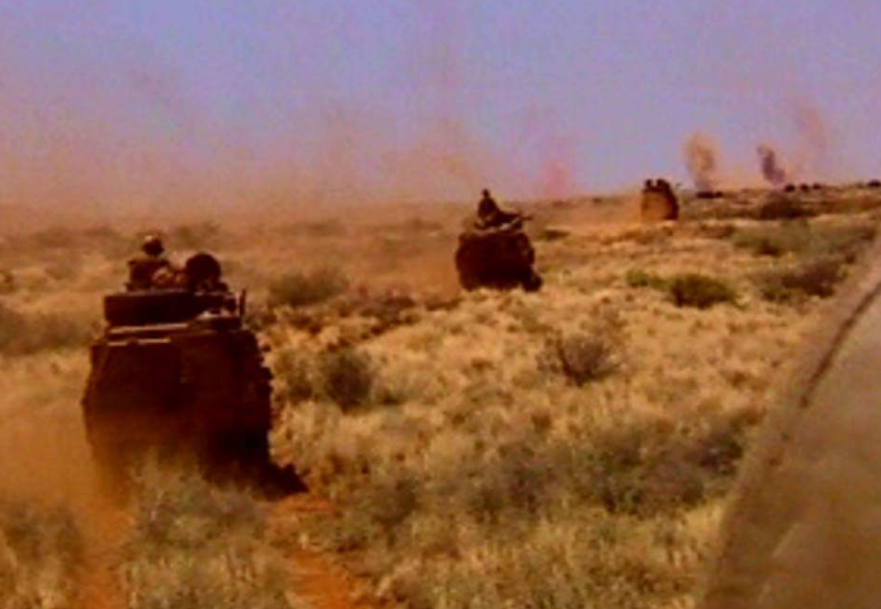
Ratel formation approach a target on a range at Lohatla

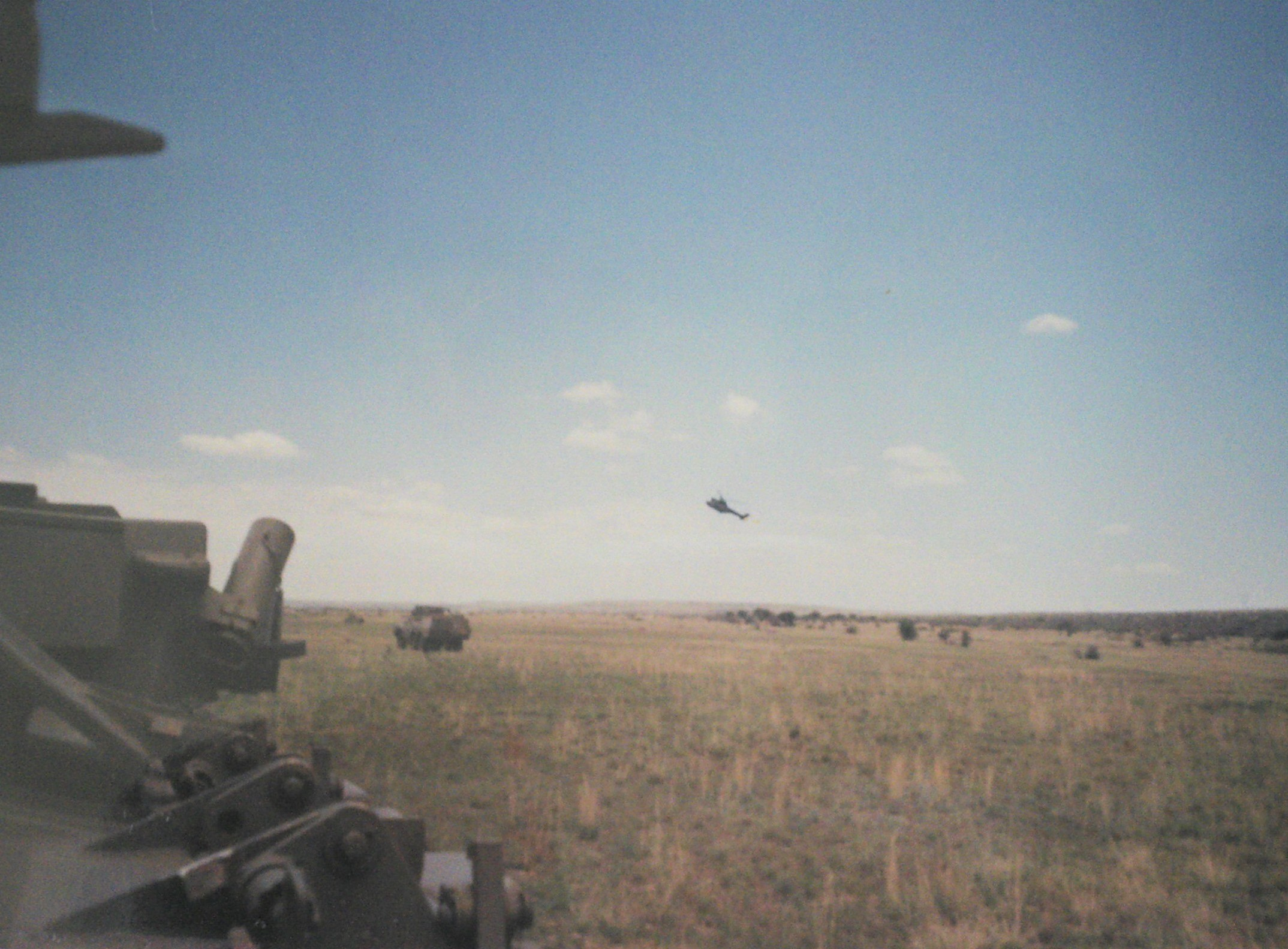
8 SAI Ratel IFVs on a training range in a mechanised assault, Lohatla Army Battle School, 1993

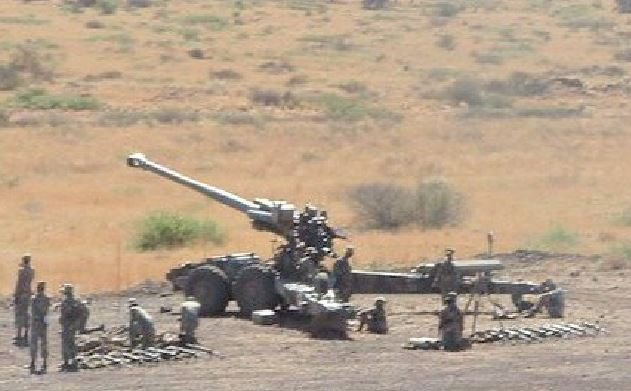
G5 howitzer on range

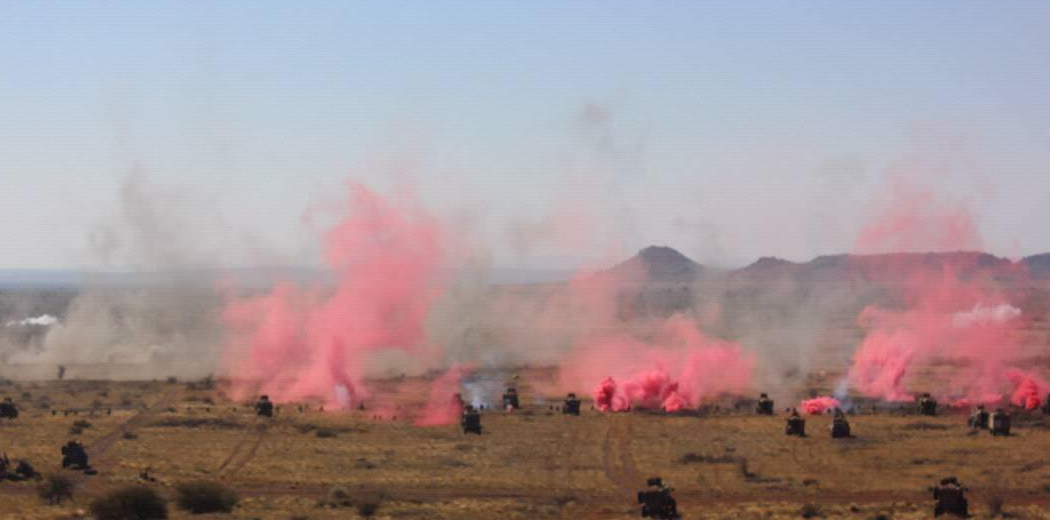
Infantry in fire and maneuver at Lohatla

=== Insignia ===
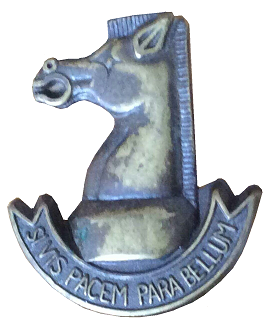
SADF era Lohatla Army Battle School beret badge

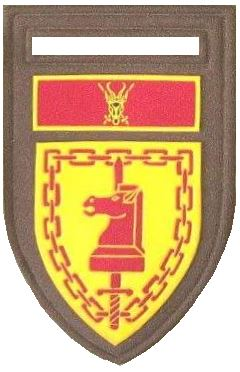
SADF era Lohatla Army Battle School Tupper Flash

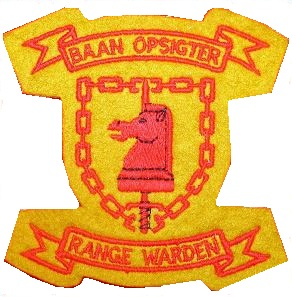
SADF era Lohatla Range Warden Badge

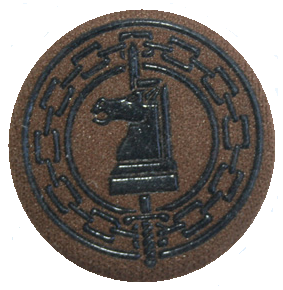
SANDF era Lohatla Instructor Badge

=== SANDF era ===
A long-running land dispute involving the South African Army Combat Training Centre (CTC) at Lohatlha in the Northern Cape ended when the Department of Rural Development and Land Reform found alternative land to settle some of the community displaced by the 158 000 hectare base and training area in 1977.

The institution was renamed the South African Army Combat Training Centre on 24 October 2000.

==== Annual Exercise Seboka integrated training ====
Exercise Seboka demonstrates the training of units in operations from each combat discipline. Infantry, Armour, Artillery, Intelligence, Air Defence Artillery, Engineers as well as elements from the Air Force and Military Health Serves are integrated. The exercise gives units the opportunity to plan and execute mobile warfare operations in real-time command and control under the supervision of experienced commanders.

==== Training of the African Standby Force ====
The Army Combat Training Centre hosted the Amani Africa 2 field exercise to demonstrate the African Unions rapid deployment capability in 2015. The field exercise involved five regional economic communities, as structures of the African Union. Approximately 5,400 members from the military, police, and civilian components, representing four of the regional economic regions of the AU participated in the exercise. Countries involved included Algeria, Angola, Botswana, Burundi, Democratic Republic of the Congo, Egypt, Eswatini, Ethiopia, Gambia, Ghana, Kenya, Lesotho, Malawi, Mozambique, Namibia, Nigeria, Rwanda, South Africa, Uganda, Zambia, and Zimbabwe.

== Leadership ==
Leadership
From	Commanding Officer	To	Ribbon
1978	Brig F.E.C. van den Berg	1981	
1981	Brig C. van Rooyen	1984	
1984	Brig Eddie Webb	nd	
1 March 2005	Brigadier General J.D. Magasela	1 December 2007	
1 December 2007	Brigadier General Nontobeko Mpaxa	1 March 2013	
1 March 2013	Brigadier General Bhasie Gqoboka	31 December 2014	
1 January 2015	Brigadier General Mawethu Mdlulwa	nd	
2015	Brigadier General Manyonyo Mofokeng	2023	
nd	Brigadier General Z. Mbi	Present	
From	Regimental Sergeant Major	To	Ribbon
c. 1978	WO1 J.H. Burger	c. 1980	
c. 1980	WO1 G. Venter	c. 1981	
