= 61 Mechanised Battalion Group =

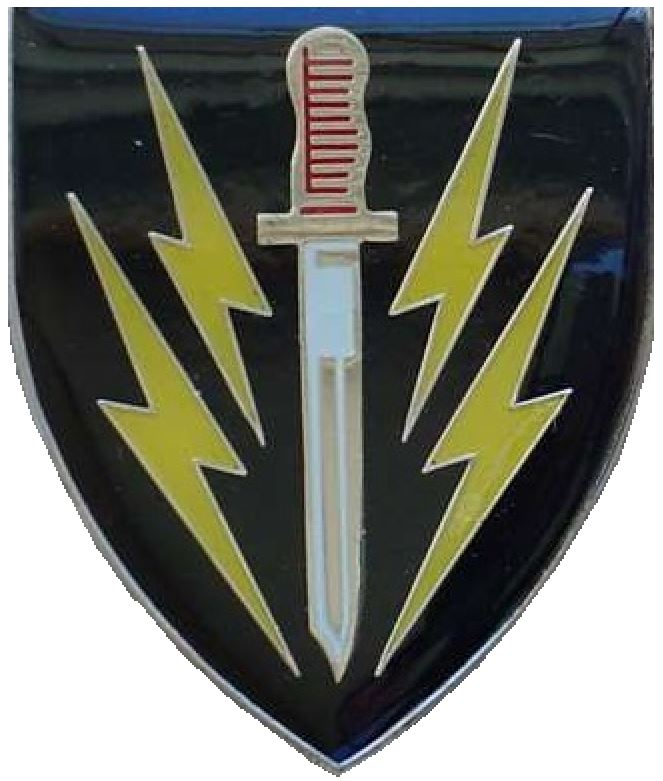
- 61 Mechanised Battalion emblem
- Active: 1978 – 2005
- Disbanded: 2005
- Country: South Africa
- Allegiance: South Africa
- Branch: South African Army
- Type: Mechanised Battle Group
- Part of: South African Infantry Corps
- Garrison: Otavi, Tsumeb, Omuthiya, Lohatla Army Battle School
- Nickname: 61 Mech
- Motto: Mobilitate vincere
- Equipment: Ratel (all types); Eland Mk7 90mm and 60mm Armoured Cars; Rooikat; Buffel; G5 howitzer
- Engagements: South African Border War

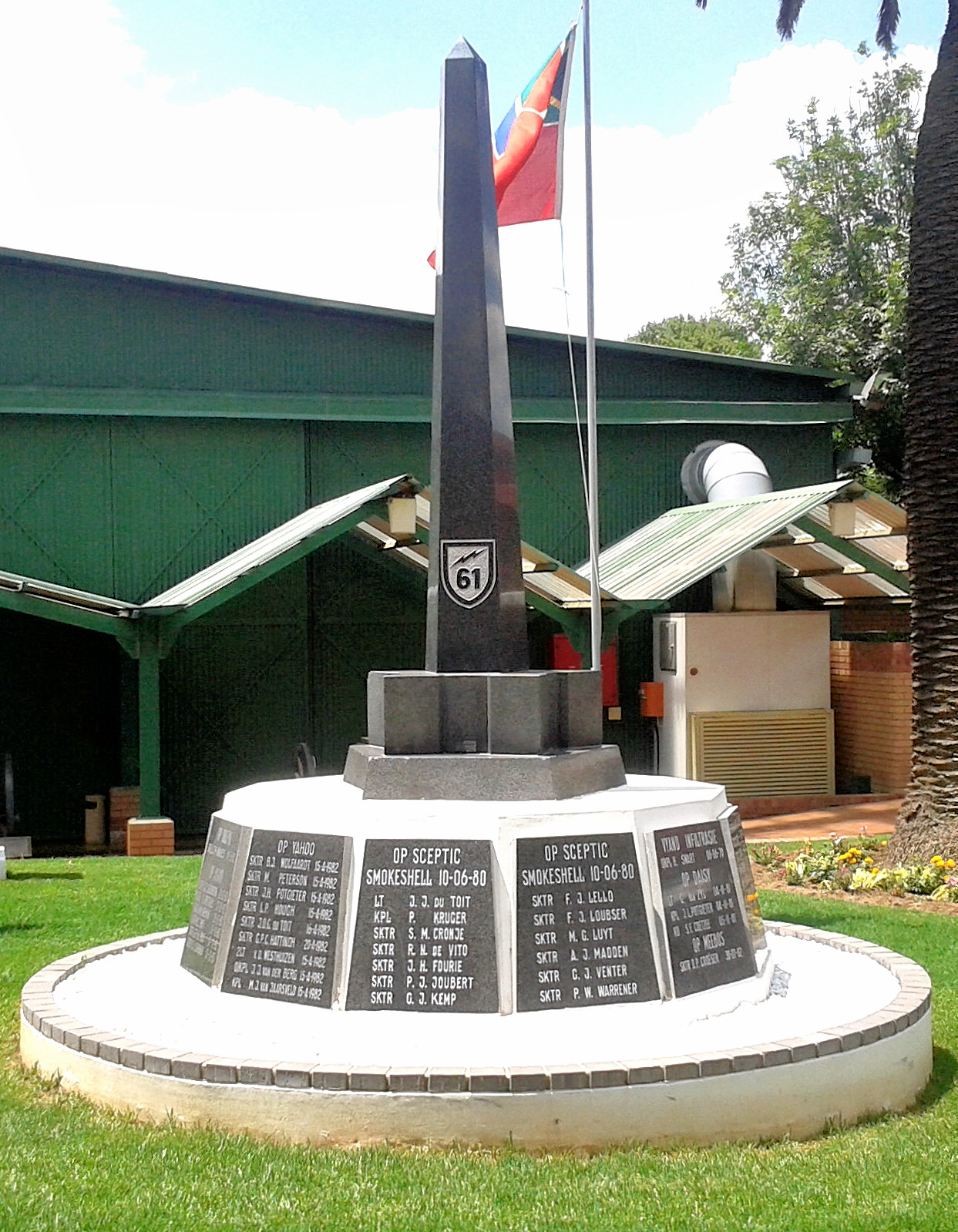
61 Mechanised Battalion Group Memorial

61 Mechanised Battalion Group was a unit of the South African Infantry Corps; although it was classed as mechanized infantry, it was a combined arms force consisting of infantry, armour and artillery, it was known for partaking in many military operations during the South African Border War and was also known for supporting battalions such as the 301 Battalion in protecting the borders of SWA.

== History ==
=== Combat Group Juliet ===
General Constand Viljoen, Chief of the Army, formulated a plan in 1978 to introduce a mechanized combat group to Ovamboland in the then South West Africa, to conduct operations against SWAPO. Combat Group Juliet was then formed under the command of Commandant Frank Bestbier.

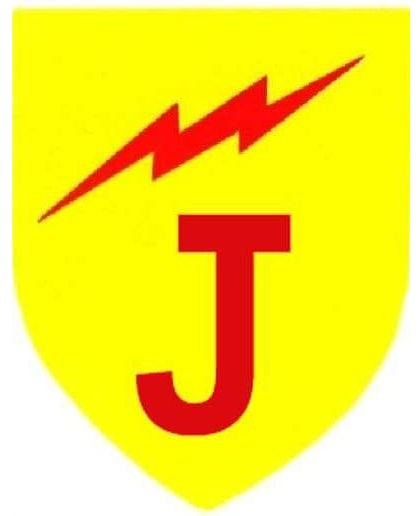
SADF temporary vehicle marker for Combat Group Juliet

=== Operation Reindeer ===
The Battle Group first saw action in Operation Reindeer in early May 1978, launching an attack on SWAPO's Western Front headquarters and logistics base, at Chetequera, 15 km north of the South West African border, with a mechanized assault force. This attack formed part of Operation Reindeer during which paratroopers attacked a separate target at Cassinga, some 300 km into Angola. After Operation Reindeer it was decided to establish a permanent conventional mechanized combat unit in the operational area and Commandant Johann Dippenaar was appointed to set up this unit.

By January 1979, the Battle Group was renamed 61 Mechanised Battalion and became part of the regular order of battle. 61 Mech served for over a decade in the territory fighting both a guerrilla war against the South-West Africa People's Organisation, as well as taking part in conventional operations against Cuban and Angolan forces.

=== South West Africa Headquarters of 61 Mech ===
A tactical headquarters for 61 Mech was initially established at Otavi but during April 1979 this was moved to Tsumeb. 61 Mech was eventually resettled at Omuthiya, with a base headquarters in Tsumeb.

==== Further operations ====
61 Mech was primarily involved in these operations.

- Operation Carrot (1979)
- Operation Sceptic (1980)
- Operation Protea (1981)
- Operation Daisy (1981)
- Operation Meebos (1982)
- Operation Yahoo (1982)
- Operation Dolfyn (1983)
- Operation Askari (1983)
- Operation Vasvat (1984)
- Operation Nekomdraai (1984)
- Operation Pronkertjie (1985)
- Operation Viper (1985)
- Operation Benzine
- Operation Moduler
- Operation Hooper
- Operation Packer
- Operation Excite (1988)
- Operation Linger
- Operation Merlyn (1989)
- Operation Arson I
- Operation Arson II
- Operation Light Foot
- Operation Ventic
- Operation Pikadel
- Operation Reward
- Operation Displace
- Operation Jamba
- Operation Hulti (1988)
- Operation Prone (1988)
- Operation Makro (1981)

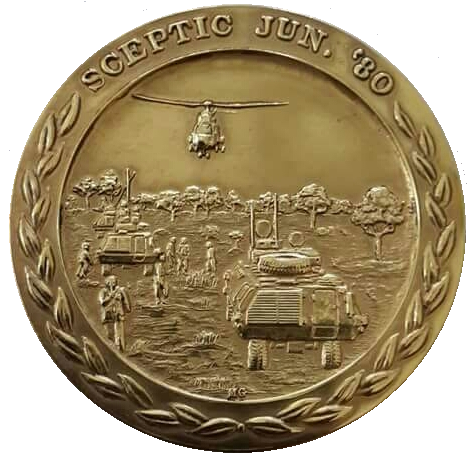
SADF Operation Sceptic Commemorative medallion

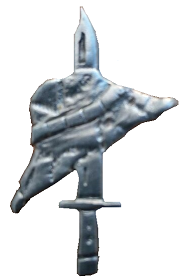
SADF Operation Hooper participation bar

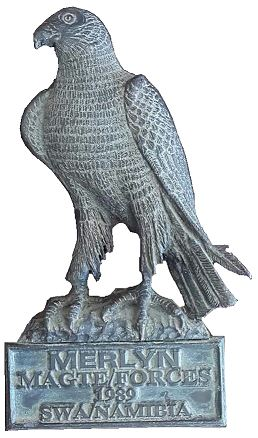
61 Mech was part of the Sector 10 response to the Cuban buildup and SWAPO incursions, known as the Merlyn Forces in 1989 South West Africa

=== Relocation to South Africa and Lohatla Army Battle School ===
During September 1991 61 Mech Bn Gp, which was based at Rooikop in Namibia, resettled at the Army Battle School in Lohatla, South Africa. 61 Mech remained part of C Army's Reserve, under operational command of 60 Brigade HQ and administratively supported by the Army Battle School. During this time, C Army amended the organisation of the Battle School to execute two functions concurrently:

- first, continuing to administer the facility as a large training institution for reserves and full-time forces as it had been in the past;
- second, to provide the headquarters for a virtual Rapid Deployment Force (including 61 Mech), as part of its permanent order of battle.

==== Operations after relocation ====
61 Mech was primarily involved in these operations.

- Operation Shobashobane
- Operation Intexo (1995)
- Operation Jumbo III (1996)
- Operation Vlakhaas (1995)
- Operation Sweepslag (1994)
- Operation Sombre (1994)

=== Disbandment ===
By 2005, 61 Mech was disbanded and its infantry elements merged into 8 South African Infantry Battalion at Upington after moving from Lohatla. The Armour and Artillery components were merged into other existing regular units of their respective corps.

== Organisation ==
61 Mech was organised along the following lines:

- two infantry companies, which were equipped with the Ratel-20 Infantry Fighting Vehicle,
- if necessary, a third infantry company was attached. On many occasions this was a company from 1 Parachute Battalion who were attached as a motorised company in Buffels
- an armoured car squadron initially equipped with Eland Armoured Cars. During 1980 the Elands were replaced by the Ratel-90 and later the Rooikat Armoured Fighting Vehicle,
- a support company consisting of an anti-tank platoon in Ratel-90s,
- an 81mm mortar platoon in Ratel-81s,
- an anti-aircraft troop and
- an artillery battery equipped with the G5 howitzer. Firepower was further augmented by the addition of the self-propelled version (G6 Rhino).
- In 1988 61 Mech also received the first combat-deployed squadron of Olifant MBTs, to counter the ever-escalating FAPLA tank threat

61 Mech was primarily tasked as the Army's Immediate Response Unit, due to its versatility.

== Equipment ==
=== Armour ===
- Eland 60
- Eland 90
- Olifant MBT

=== Armoured Personnel Carrier ===
- Buffel
- Casspir

=== Artillery ===
- 5.5(140mm)
- G2
- G4
- G5
- G6

=== Anti Aircraft ===
- Ystervark

=== Personal Weapons ===
- R1
- R4
- R5
- FN Mag
- 60mm patrol mortar
- RPG

=== Fighting Vehicles ===
- Ratel 20
- Ratel 60
- Ratel 81
- Ratel 90
- Ratel Command
- Ratel ZT3

=== Logistics ===
- samil 10 lappiespomp
- Samil 20
- Samil 50
- Samil 100
- Rinkhals ambulance

== Insignia ==
=== Standard Dress ===
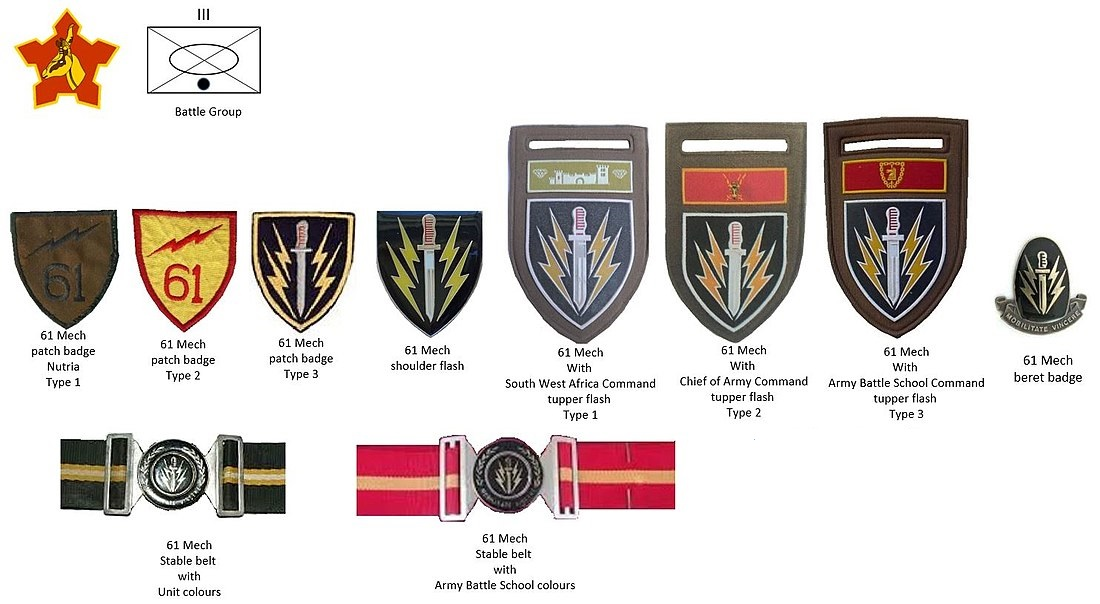
SADF era 61 Mech Battalion insignia

=== Ops Badge ===
61 Mech awarded a small badge called the Operational Badge for those in or attached to the unit who deployed with the unit on operational duties. The badge had a yellow backing and was awarded initially only for cross border operations into Angola. A subsequent version with a green backing was suggested which was to be for internal duties. This version was never authorised and the yellow badge was awarded for all operational deployments. The badge consisted of a dagger with three diagonal lightning bolts in red across it. A subdued version was produced for wear on nutria (brown's) uniforms. With the introduction of camouflage, a new version was produced on green thatching.

Badges
Operational Participation Bar

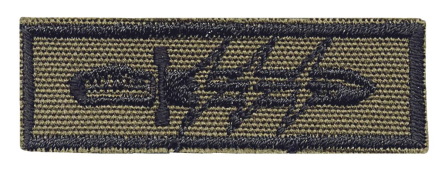
Operational Participation Bar Field Dress (Old Style)

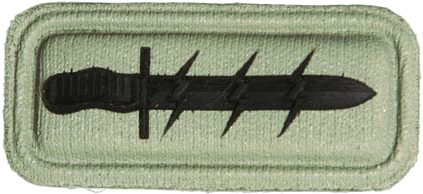
Operational Participation Bar Field Dress (New Style)

61 Mech Veteran Bar

This knifepoint always faced the heart of the wearer.

=== Companies ===
Each company or element in the Battalion (group) had its own flag and identifying badge.

Company Insignia
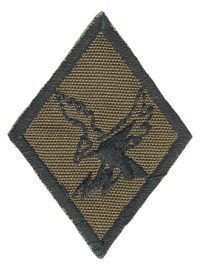
HQ Company

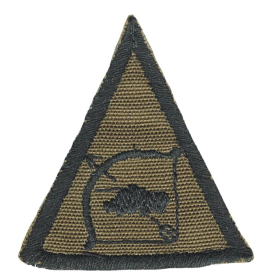
Alpha Company - Infantry

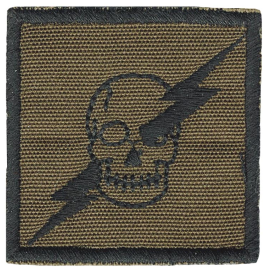
Bravo Company - Infantry

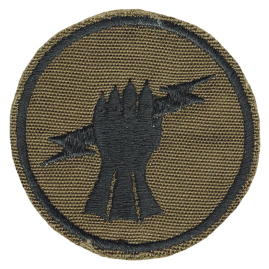
61 Mech Charlie Squadron - Armour

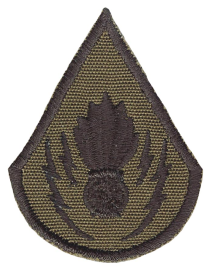
61 Mech Sierra Battery - Artillery

== Leadership ==
61 Mechanised Battalion Group Leadership
From	Commanding Officers	To
1978	Cmdt Frank Bestbier (Note: Veggroup (Battle Group) Juliet)	1978
Nov 1978	Cmdt Johan Dippenaar (Note: In November 1978 Johan Dippenaar was appointed SO 1 Operation Planning at 2 Military Area Head Quarters (later to be known as Sector 10 headquarters) at Oshakati, as well as the commander of the newly established mechanized unit, which was to be stationed at Oshivello. He immediately started to plan for the establishment of this new mechanized unit and he handed over to Roland De Vries in Jan 1981)	Jan 1981
Jan 1981	Cmdt Roland de Vries SD,SM,MMM (Note: Later Major General)	1982
1983	Cmdt Gert van Zyl	1983
1984	Cmdt Ep van Lill	1985
1985	Cmdt Kobus Smit	1987
1988	Cmdt Mike Muller	1990
1991	Cmdt Gerhard Louw	1993
1994	Cmdt Hannes van der Merwe	1995
1995	Cmdt Danie Laas	1996
1996	Cmdt Jaap Steyn	1999
1999	Lt Col Ettienne Visagie	2005
From	Regimental Sergeants Major	To
1979	WO1 M.C. Barnard	1981
1981	WO1 H.G. Smit	1985
1985	WO1 Tjaart van der Walt	1986
1986	WO1 Kobus Kemp	1992
1993	WO1 J.A.B. van Zyl	1993
1994	WO1 G.P. Barnard	1995
1996	WO1 A.H. du Toit	1999
1999	WO1 H.A. van Zyl	2005
2005	WO1 D.D. Lewis	2005
From	Chaplains	To
1978	Ds Landman Vogel (Note: Rest in Peace) (Note: Gereformeerde Kerk, Tsumeb) (Note: For 1978 and 1979 the appointment was not permanent)	1979
1980	Ds Braam le Roux	1980
1981	Ds Koos Rossouw	1982
1983	No permanent Appointment	1983
1984	Ds Johan van Niekerk	1986
1986	Ds Schalk Pienaar	1986
1987	Ds Johan van Niekerk	1987
1987	Ds Marius Cornelissen	1987
1988	Ds Anton Kemp	1990
1990	Ds Stoffel Helmut	1990
1991	Ds Fanus Hansen	1996
1997	Pastor Pieter Bezuidenhout	2005

== Honoris Crux recipients ==
61 Mech Honoris Crux recipients
Surname	Initials	Rank	Year	Operation
du Toit	J.J.	Lt	1980	Operation Sceptic
Rutherford	G.T.	LCPL	1980	Operation Sceptic
van der Westhizen	D.R.	2nd Lt	1981	Operation Carrot
Anderson	L.A.	Maj	1981	Operation Daisy
Steyn	S.S.	2nd Lt	1982	Operation Meebos
le Roux	H.C.	2nd Lt	1983	Operation Phoenix (South Africa)
Macaskill	A.	2nd Lt	1984	Operation Askari
Kooij	J.	2nd Lt	1987	Operation Moduler
Bremer	H.M.	2nd Lt	1987	Operation Moduler
Green	G.W.	Rfn	1987	Operation Moduler

== Battle Honours ==
Battle Honours
Awarded to 61 Mechanised Battalion Group
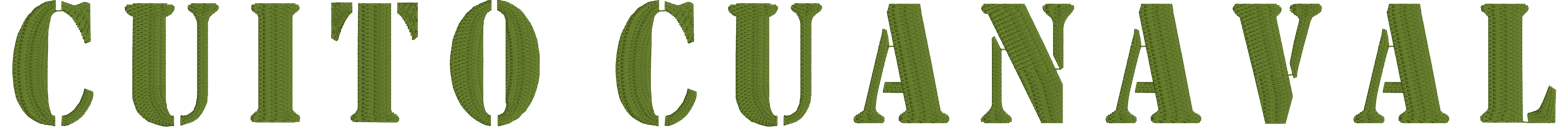
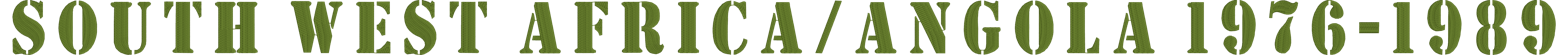
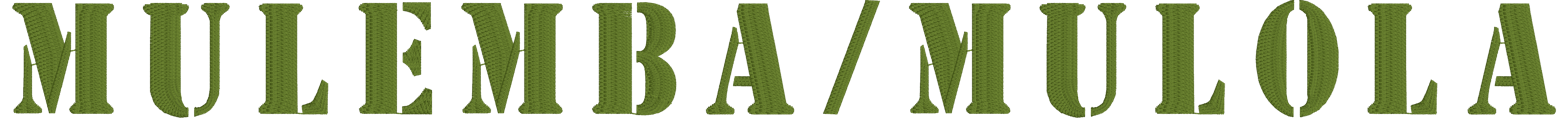
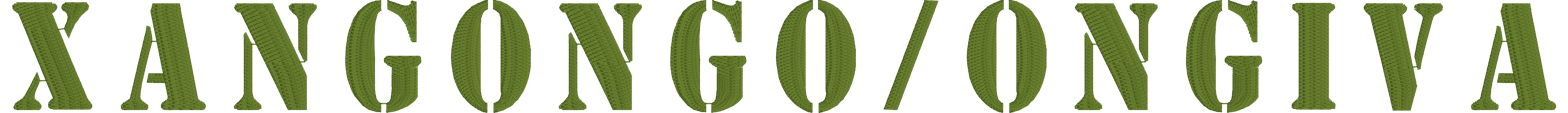
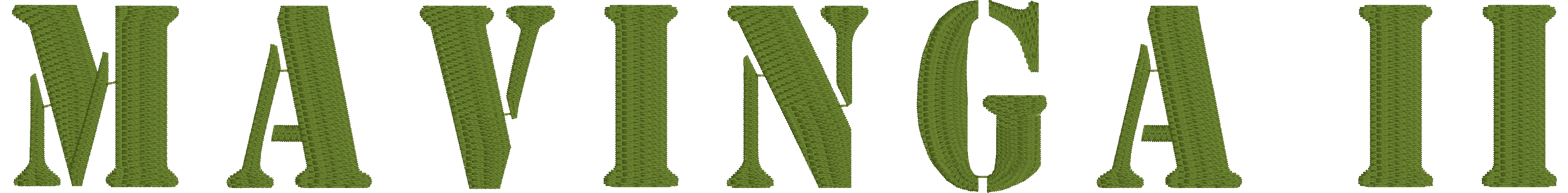
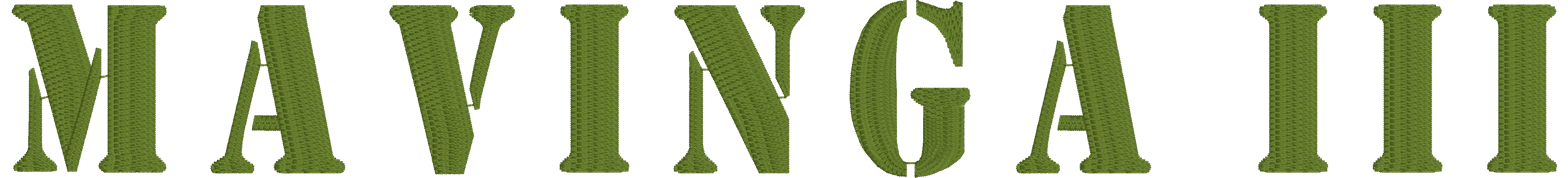
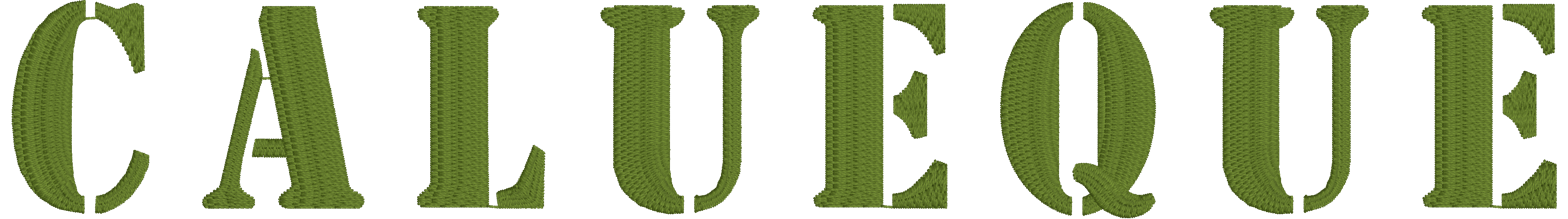

== Further developments ==
From 61 Mech's success, 62 Mechanised Battalion Group and 63 Mechanised Battalion Group, were developed, encompassing similar battlegroup principles.

Theoretically the three units would have formed 60 Brigade, South Africa's highly mobile brigade level response to a full conventional attack on South West Africa.

== Other sources ==
- de Vries, Roland (2015-11-13). "The Influence of the Ratel Infantry Fighting Vehicle on Mobile Warfare in Southern Africa". Scientia Militaria: South African Journal of Military Studies. 43 (2). doi:10.5787/43-2-1129. ISSN 2224-0020.
- Steenkamp, Willem; Heitman, Helmoed Roemer (2016). Mobility Conquers: The Story Of 61 Mechanised Battalion Group 1978-2005 (Hardcover). Helion & Company (published 1 September 2016). ISBN 978-1-911096-52-8.
- Scholtz, Leopold (2013). The SADF in the Border War 1966-1989 (Paperback). Cape Town: Tafelberg. p. 544. ISBN 978-0-624-05410-8.
- OOSTHUIZEN, Gerhard J.J. (November 2014). "The South African Defence Force and Operation Hooper, Southeast Angola, December 1987 to March 1988". Scientia Militaria: South African Journal of Military Studies. 42 (2). doi:10.5787/42-2-1095. ISSN 2224-0020.
- Davies, R. Mark. South African Forces in the Border War (Angola and South West Africa) 1980 to 1989 (PDF).
