= Operation Merlyn =

1989 South African Border War operation

- Part of the South African Border War
- Location: Namibia Operation Merlyn (Namibia)
- Objective: Prevent the incursion of PLAN (SWAPO) insurgents into South West Africa/Namibia in contravention to a ceasefire which came into effect on 1 April 1989.
- Date: 1–9 April 1989
- Outcome: South African tactical victory
- Casualties: SWAPO/PLAN: 300 killed South Africa: 27 killed

Operation Merlyn (aka The Nine Day War) was a military operation by the South African Defence Force (SADF), South West African Territorial Force (SWATF) and South West African Police (SWAPOL) during the South African Border War and Angolan Civil War in April 1989. The aim of the operation was to prevent the incursion of PLAN (SWAPO) insurgents into South West Africa/Namibia from bases in Angola. These incursions were in violation of a ceasefire which came into effect on 1 April 1989 via the implementation of United Nations Security Council Resolution 435 and the Tripartite Accord. Initially, these PLAN incursions were tackled by South West African police units and eventually by SADF and SWATF units, released to assist the police having been confined to their bases by the peace agreements. These incursions and the conflict that occurred ended after hastily arranged talks resulted in the Mount Etjo Declaration and an eventual ceasefire.

== Background ==
On 22 December 1988, at the United Nations (UN) in New York City, the South African, Cuban and Angolan government representatives met to sign the New York Accords better known as the Tripartite Accords. This represented the end of twelve rounds of negotiations between three parties which had started on 3 May 1988, chaired by the American representative Chester Crocker and attended by officials from the Soviet Union. The end of twelve rounds of negotiations saw an agreement that linked the implementation of United Nations Council Resolution 435 with the withdrawal of all Cuban soldiers from Angola. The agreement saw the initial withdrawal of 3000 Cuban soldiers followed by movement of troops further north in Angola, then staggered withdrawals from Angola resulting in all troops gone by 1 July 1991. The date for the implementation UN Resolution 435 was the 1 April 1989. The agreement did not, however, end the conflict between two Angolan adversaries in the Angolan Civil War, the MPLA and UNITA. United Nations verification of the Cuban withdrawal and the creation of a Joint Monitoring Commission was also agreed too. The UN created a timetable of actions over seven months required by all parties leading up to 1 April and beyond. SADF forces were to be reduced to 12000 men by six weeks before the 1 April and confined to two bases in SWA/Namibia before being reduced to 1500 men twelve weeks later. SWATF and the area-forces were to be demobilised and their arms and ammunition placed under guard. PLAN forces were also to remain confined to their bases from the 1 April. Law and order would remain with SWA Police with UNTAG international police members monitoring their impartiality. UNTAG's military component was only set to arrive at the end April beginning of May and they would monitor both the SADF and PLAN. By the 14 March 1989, the UN Secretary-General sent letters to the South African's and SWAPO proposing that on 1 April at 04h00, a ceasefire and the end of cross-border movements into and out of Namibia, would come into being. The Secretary General's proposal was agreed to by SWAPO on 18 March and 21 March by the South African government.

== Order of battle ==
=== South African and South West Africa Territorial forces ===
- South West African Police and Koevoet
- 101 Battalion
- 102 Battalion
- elements 61 Mechanised Battalion Group
- elements 4 South African Infantry Battalion / 62 Mechanised Battalion Group
- 6 SAI Bn company
- elements 8 South African Infantry Battalion / 63 Mechanised Battalion Group
- 14 Parachute Battalion Group
- Several SWATF Area Force units
- SAAF helicopters

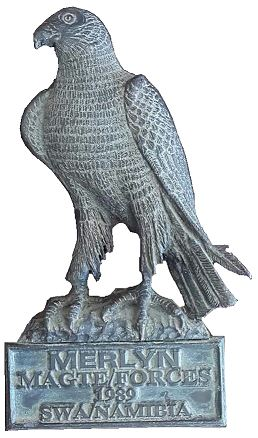
Sector 10 response to the Cuban buildup and SWAPO incursions, known as the Merlyn Forces in 1989 South West Africa

=== PLAN/SWAPO forces ===
- 1500 - 1800 insurgents

== SWAPO border violations begin ==
On 31 March, Martti Ahtisaari, UN Special Representative to UNTAG arrived in Windhoek and a dinner was held that night by the South African Administrator for SWA, Louis Pienaar, the night before the implementation of UN Resolution 435. Present were SWA officials, South African government ministers, United Nations officials and the commander of United Nations Transition Assistance Group (UNTAG). The South African Foreign Minister Pik Botha informed Martti Ahtisaari that South African Military Intelligence had been monitoring the presence of 500-700 PLAN soldiers north of the South West African (SWA) border and that 150 PLAN insurgents had already crossed the border contrary to the New York Agreement of 1988, which stipulated that PLAN remain in Angola, north of the 16th parallel. The PLAN insurgents were said to be heavily armed and in uniform. Martti Ahtisaari did not believe SWAPO would violate the treaty and therefore did not believe Pik Botha's briefing, but still informed the UN Secretary-General of the allegations.

== Clashes occur ==
=== 31 March / 1 April ===
On the night of 31 March / 1 April, approximately a thousand PLAN insurgents were stationed just north of the border. They carried personal weapons and heavy arms in the form of SAM-7's, mortars and RPG-7's and infiltrated at a number of places over 300 km apart. Some entered near Ruacana and other around Ombalantu eventually widening to a 300 km front. SWA Police units had been patrolling the border area since January and made the first contact with a PLAN unit around 6am on 1 April. Thirty PLAN insurgents and two policemen died in that first contact. As more and more contacts took place and fierce fighting began, the SWA Police units realised that a major incursion was underway. Initially, the South African Air Force (SAAF) Alouette helicopter gunships stood by helplessly and watched the SWAPOL units come under attack but their orders would soon change and they would be rearmed. The policemen were also under armed, their vehicles had their heavy weapons removed as part of the ceasefire, and only had their light weapons to defend themselves. Foreign Minister Pik Botha phoned Secretary-General Javier Pérez de Cuéllar to inform him that SWAPOL could not prevent the incursions and if UNTAG could not contain the situation, the confined SADF units would be released from their bases. Martti Ahtisaari reluctantly agreed to release a limited number of SADF units after UNTAG members flew into border zone and confirmed the incursions by PLAN insurgents, a decision which he would be criticised for later.

101 Battalion was the first unit to have its troops recalled and rearmed. 102 Battalion, SAAF helicopter gunships, 61 Mechanised Battalion Group, 4 SAI Bn Gp 62 Mechanised Battalion Group and 8 SAI Bn / 63 Mechanised Battalion Group's Ratel-90's would soon follow.

=== 2 April ===
By 2 April, UNTAG officials were able to interview two PLAN insurgents that had been captured the day before and would be presented to the media the following day. They informed the UNTAG officials that they had been instructed by their commanders to enter SWA/Namibia, avoid South African security forces and set up bases which were to be under UN management. SWAPO said meanwhile, it had not violated the ceasefire and that its personnel were already based in Namibia, had been attacked and wanted to hand their weapons over to UNTAG, while the South African government maintained that the PLAN was continuing to cross the border. At the end of 2 April, the death toll stood at 130 PLAN insurgents and 10 SWA policemen.

=== 3 April ===
The UN Secretary-General addressed the Security Council on 3 April concluding that SWAPO had infiltrated across the border violating the ceasefire but that their intention was to surrender to UNTAG, even though SWAPO maintained their previous argument that no infiltration had taken place, he urged restraint by both parties and the implementation of all agreements. The two captured PLAN soldiers that were interviewed by UNTAG on 2 April were presented to the press for interviews on 3 April.

=== 4 April ===
By 4 April the death toll stood at 172 PLAN insurgents and 21 SWA policemen. The South African Foreign Minister Pik Botha stated to the Secretary-General, that more than 1000 PLAN insurgents had crossed into SWA/Namibia, with more PLAN forces based on the border and were ready to cross. He said unless something was done now, the peace agreements could collapse.

=== 5 April ===
On the 5 April, the UN Secretary-General proposed a ceasefire to SWAPO and the South African government. The details proposed the setting up of assembly points for PLAN insurgents to gather at and then returned to Angola or disarmed allowed to go to their homes in SWA/Namibia. Within 48 hours of the ceasefire, SADF and SWATF members would be returned and confined to their bases. Pik Botha, South African Foreign Minister, informed the UN Secretary-General that PLAN insurgents were being notified by radio to return to Angola with safe passage to areas north of 16th Parallel, which was the agreement prior to the 1 April.

=== 6 April ===
On 6 April the death toll stood at 179 PLAN insurgents and 22 SWA policemen and 1 SADF/SWATF soldier. An emergency summit of African Front-line States, on the same day, agreed with the UN Secretary-General's ceasefire proposal but requested that the PLAN insurgents remain at the assembly points until the SWAPO leadership themselves return to SWA/Namibia.

=== 7 April ===
By 7 April, UN member countries began to increase their efforts to speed up the arrival of UNTAG forces in Namibia. The UN Secretary-General's 5 April proposed ceasefire, with the SADF/SWATF members confined to bases with 48 hours, was rejected by South Africans as it failed to take account of all existing agreements, the PLAN insurgents were supposed to be beyond the 16th Parallel. PLAN insurgents continued to stream across the border and the SADF security forces encountered two groups close to Oshakati, one containing 200 insurgents in trenches. The death toll at the end of the day stood at 253 PLAN insurgents and 26 policemen and SADF/SWATF members.

== Mt Etjo Declaration ==
=== 8 April ===
8 April saw Sam Nujoma announce that SWAPO had instructed PLAN insurgents in SWA/Namibia to stop fighting and regroup to withdraw under UNTAG escort to Angola. This would occur in 72 hours. At the same time, the South African government temporarily stopped the implementation of Resolution 435 and reintroduced curfew in the border area and reactivated the area force units. On the same day, the Joint Monitoring Commission made up of the South African, Cuban and Angolan representatives met at a game ranch at Mount Etjo, with American and Soviet observers. The UN Namibian representatives were invited on the 9 April. By the end of this day, 261 PLAN insurgents had died.

=== 9 April ===
The 9 April resulted in Mount Etjo Declaration which had been agreed to by all those parties present. The declaration stated that all parties agreed to the existing peace agreements and that PLAN insurgents withdraw to nine border assembly points maintained by UNITAG forces, to be in place by 11 April, and then transported to places above the 16th Parallel in Angola. PLAN insurgents would be given a weeks grace to arrive at these assembly points while South African forces would not attack unless they were attacked first. Only a few arrived at these points with most choosing to cross the border on their own, not trusting the declaration and more PLAN insurgents would die because of this.

== SADF/SWATF reconfined to bases ==
At a meeting of the Joint Monitoring Commission (JMC) in northern Namibia on 20 April, it was agreed to return SADF and SWATF units to their bases in seven days. On 26 April, that agreement was implemented and SADF & SWATF units were confined to their bases for three days to allow PLAN insurgents to leave Namibia and return to Angola. A goodwill gesture by the South Africans on 26 April saw the release of 34 captured PLAN insurgents but 289 had been killed by this stage and 27 SWAPOL, SWATF and SADF members had died. In Cape Town, at a meeting from 27 to 29 April, of South African, Cuban and Angolan representatives, the 13 May was the agreed date when SADF and SWATF units would be confined to bases though this was not entirely acceptable to the UN Secretary General.

== SADF/SWATF forces released again ==
On 29 April, 200-400 PLAN insurgents were said to remain in Ovamboland and the South African forces were again released from their base with more PLAN insurgents killed after 28 April until 13 May. The final death toll climbed to 306 PLAN insurgents while on the South African side, had been finalized at 20 policemen, 7 SADF/SWATF members and over 100 wounded. The South Africans were worried about a further PLAN incursion around 4 May but it failed to materialise.

== Peace returns ==
On 19 May the South Africans, Angolans and Cubans released a statement stating that all SADF/SWATF units were now confined to base and that the fighting was over and the implementation of UN Resolution 435 and the independence process would resume.

== Aftermath ==
By the 26 June, the SADF had withdrawn all its troops except for 1500 soldiers who were confined to their bases at Grootfontein and Oshivelo and would remain there until a week after the announcement of the election result. Due to the vastness of the Namibian countryside, the election day voting was spread from 7 to 11 November. Ballot counting began on the 13 November. By the 14 November, the United Nations Special Representative for Namibia, Martti Ahtisaari, declared the election as free and fair and announced the result. The result of the election left SWAPO as the winner of the election with 57.3% of the vote, Democratic Turnhalle Alliance 28.6%, United Democratic Front 5.6% and the Action Christian National received 3.5%. By the 21 November 1989, the last remaining 1500 soldiers of the South African Defense Force, based at Grootfontein and Oshivelo, were withdrawn from Namibia. On the 21 March 1990, an independence ceremony was held in Namibian capital of Windhoek. In attendance was South African President FW de Klerk who watched the lowering of the South African flag and the raising of the new Namibian flag. The new Namibian President Sam Nujoma was then sworn in by UN Secretary-General Javier Pérez de Cuéllar.
