= 63 Mechanised Battalion Group =

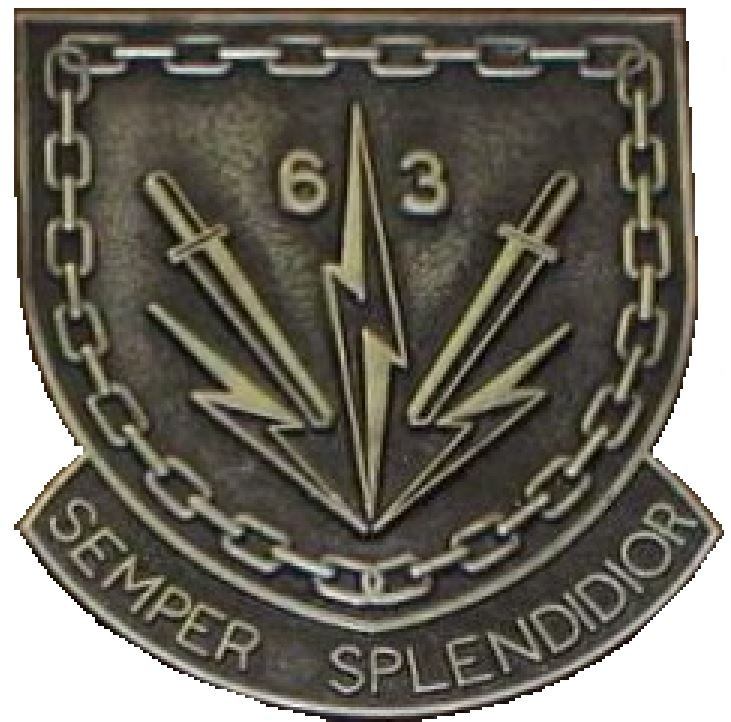
- SADF 63 Mechanised Battalion unit emblem
- Active: 1989 – 1994
- Disbanded: 1994 (Note: 63 Mech only existed 12 months and was disbanded Dec 1989 – from there on the unit was called 8SAI operational Grp)
- Country: South Africa
- Allegiance: South Africa
- Branch: South African Army
- Type: Mechanised Battle Group
- Part of: South African Infantry Corps
- Garrison/HQ: Upington, Eenhana, Omithiya, Oshivello, Lohatla Army Battle School
- Nickname(s): 63 Mech, 63 Meg (Afrikaans)
- Motto(s): Semper Splendidior
- Equipment: Ratel 20,60,81,90; Rooikat 1991 onwards at ABS; G5 howitzer; Samil 20,50,100; Kwevoel 100
- Engagements: South African Border War; Operation Merlyn; Operation Agree

Commanders
- Notable commanders: Commandant (Note: Later Brig Gen) Koos Liebenberg (Note: Cmdt Liebenberg was the only OC, commanding the unit from its initial formation until its disbanding)

63 Mechanised Battalion Group was a unit of the South African Infantry Corps; although it was classed as mechanized infantry, it was a combined arms force consisting of infantry, armour and artillery. Together with 61 Mechanised Battalion Group and 62 Mechanised Battalion Group, these units made up 60 Brigade encompassing battlegroup principles.

== Insignia ==
A chain border on a black shield, three lightning bolts, two swords and the number 63.

== History ==
=== Origins ===
63 Mechanised Battalion Group was part of 60 Brigade, based at Lohatla Army Battle School and was formed in 1988 mainly from the operational battalion of 8 South African Infantry Battalion and Ratel 90 Squadrons from 1 Special Service Battalion. Support companies of anti-tank, assault pioneers (sapper), 81 mm (3.2 in) mortars and their logistical team were also transferred from 1 South African Infantry Battalion in October 1988 to 8 South African Infantry Battalion for integration during a brigade level exercise at Lohatla Army Battle School called Exercise Sweepslag prior to the Group being sent north to South West Africa. The only commander was "Blok " Liebenberg, a veteran of 61 Mech.

=== Sector 10 South West Africa ===
63 Mech was seconded to the command of Sector 10 in northern South West Africa in 1989 for its short operational life of about 12 months.

A combined Brigade level exercise with 61 Mech and 62 Mech occurred in the Oshivello area in January 1989.

=== Operation Merlyn ===
63 Mech took part in one strategic operation, repulsing a major incursion of SWAPO into Namibia, in April 1989:

- On Saturday 1 April, reports were received of Koevoet, a unit of the South West African Police SWAPOL, taking losses from multiple contacts with SWAPO insurgents.
- On Sunday 2 April 63 Mech now with Koevoet, engaged SWAPO insurgents near Oshikango. 1 Casspir was hit with AK and RPG fire.
- On Monday 3 April, tracking of the insurgents began. Allouette gunship helicopters assisted in visuals. Some 32 SWAPO were killed or captured.
- From Tuesday 4 April, tracking continued around Oshikango.
- On Wednesday 5 April, the unit divided into 3 search groups.
- By Thursday 6 April, the area around Onamagula was being searched, when a column drove into an ambush. A Ratel was lost. About 16 SWAPO were killed in the ensuing battle.

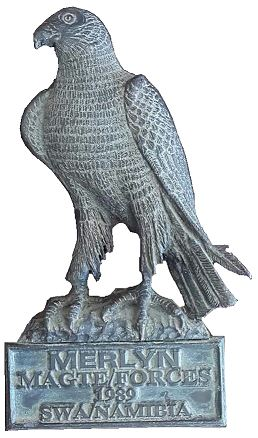
63 Mech was part of the Sector 10 response to the Cuban buildup and SWAPO incursions, known as the Merlyn Forces in 1989 South West Africa

=== Operation Agree ===
63 Mech Group withdrew with the majority of SADF Forces from Namibia on 31 November 1989.

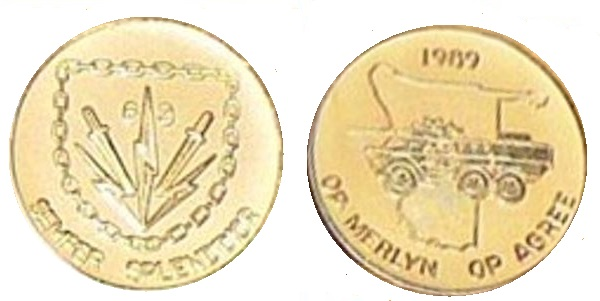
63 Mech commemorative medal for South West Africa operations

=== Lohatla Army Battle School ===
From 1989 to 1994, elements of 63 Mech's originating units were deployed internally within South Africa. Some squadrons in Zeerust 2SSB also did riot patrols as required while other squadrons were based in Lohatla and did border duty there after.

The Battle Group experience of 63 Mech continued to be used by 8 SAI, 1 SSB and 2 SSB in annual integrated conventional warfare training at Lohatla Army Battle School.

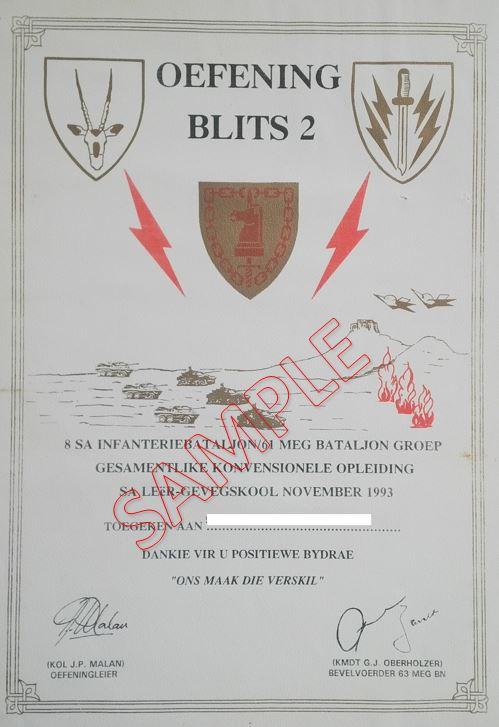
63 Mech Blits 2 exercise certificate, Lohatla Army Battle School 1993

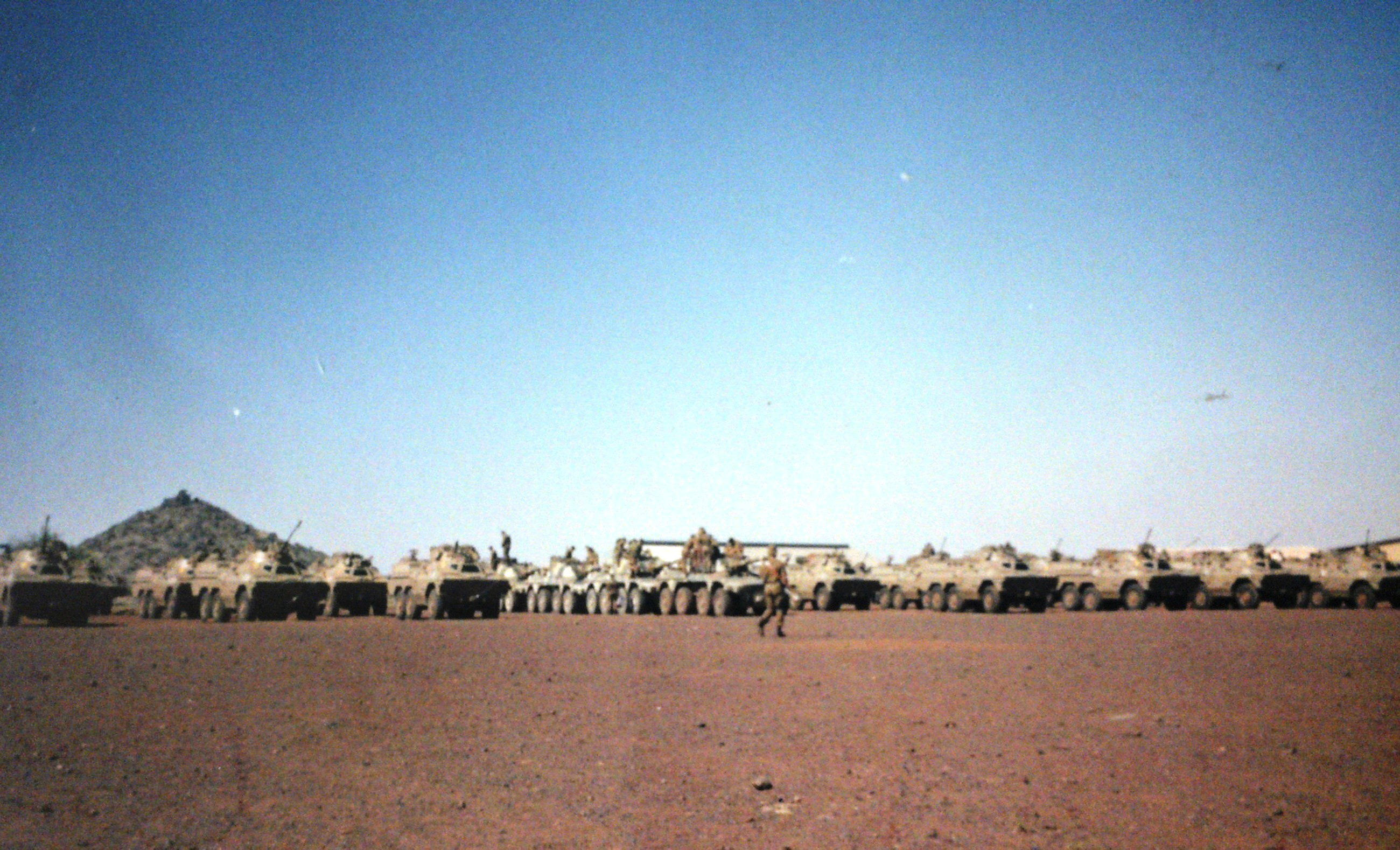
63 Mech elements preparing for joint training with 61 Mech Lohatla Army Battle School 1993, 8SAI Ratel 20s, 60s can be seen with Rooikats from 61 Mech.

== Battlegroup Organisation ==
63 Mech Group's structure was designed to be modified as various tasks required.

=== Deployment in South West Africa ===
For the specific engagements in Operation Merlyn and Agree however, the unit included:

- Two mechanised infantry companies (A and B Companies) from 8 SAI
- One tank squadron (C Squadron) from the School of Armour – no tanks were ever part of the unit
- One G5 battery (S Battery) from 4 Artillery Regiment – only joined the unit after it returned to Lohathla
- One armoured car squadron (E Squadron) from 1 SSB, Bloemfontein
- One air defence troop (F Squadron) from 6th Light Anti-Aircraft Regiment or 10th Anti-Aircraft Regiment
- One engineer troop
- One Support Company which included mortar, antitank and assault pioneer platoons

=== Exercises at Lohatla Army Battle School ===
From 1990, 63 Mech was activated annually only for joint training exercises where 8 SAI was the lead entity: By 1991, Rooikat armoured cars and Ratel ZT3s were added to these exercises at Lohatla Army Battle School.

Notable exercises included Excalibur 1 and 2 as well as Blits 2.

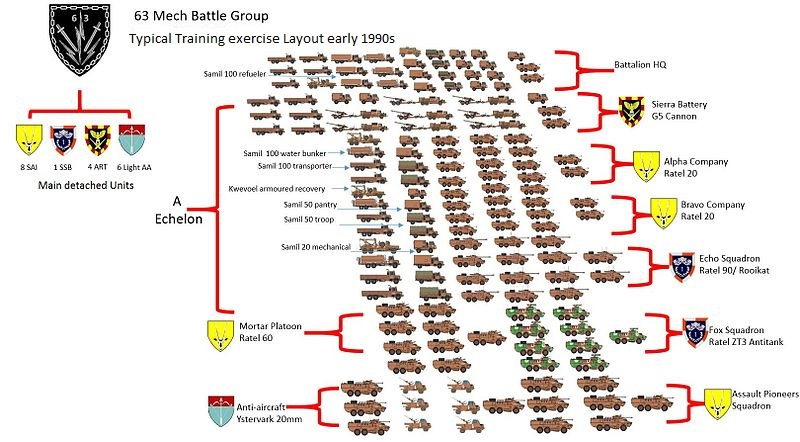
63 Mech echelon layout 1990s for Exercise Excalibur Lohatla 1991

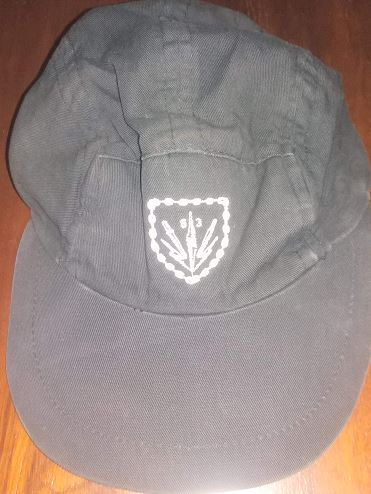
63 Mech field cap issued to members joining to aid in the new units cohesion

== SANDF Rethink ==
By 1994, the 63 Mech nomenclature was totally abandoned. The battlegroup principles however continue to be utilised in the current SANDF's training program as and when the need arises.

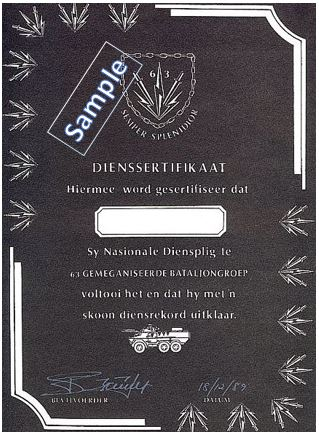
63 Mech honorable discharge certificate
