= Operation Dolfyn =

- Part of the South African Border War
- Location: Angola Operation Dolfyn (Angola)
- Objective: Interrupt the infiltration routes of PLAN into SWA/Namibia by attacking PLAN bases and headquarters around the Angolan town of Cuvelai
- Date: May – June 1983

Operation Dolfyn (English: Operation Dolphin) was a military operation in Angola from May 1983 by the South African Defence Force (SADF) during the Angolan Civil War and South African Border War.

== Background ==
The aim of the operation locate and destroy the People's Liberation Army of Namibia (PLAN) Eastern Command headquarters which was thought to be north of Cuvelai as well any other bases in the area. The operation took place during May and June 1983 and consisted of many small contacts.

Forces were divided into Task Force West under command of Col. Linford and Task Force East was under command of Col. Phillip Lloyd. Each task force was allocated an Air Force MOAT (Note: MOAT: Mobile Airborne Operations Team.) with each MOAT having two Alouette Gunships plus one Alouette troop carrier helicopter under their command.

The operation ended at the beginning of July. The town of Cuvelai would again be the target of the SADF during Operation Askari at the end of December 1983.

=== Order of Battle for SADF ===
The SADF units consisted of elements from:

- Three companies of 32 Battalion,
- 4 SAI,
- Regiment Groot Karoo.
- Reserve:
  - Two Companies of 44 Parachute Brigade
  - Mobile force from 61 Mechanised Battalion

== Notes and references ==
=== Bibliography ===
- Lord, Dick Brig. Gen (2008). From Fledgling to Eagle: The South African Air Force during the Border War. Newlands: 30° South Publishers. ISBN 978-1920143-30-5.
- Scholtz, Leopold (2013). The SADF in the Border War 1966-1989. Cape Town: Tafelberg. ISBN 978-0-624-05410-8.

=== Further reading ===
- Nortje, Piet (2004). 32 Battalion: The inside story of South Africa's elite fighting unit. Cape Town: Zebra Press. ISBN 1868729141.
