= Roland de Vries =

South African military officer

Major General Roland de Vries SD SM MMM
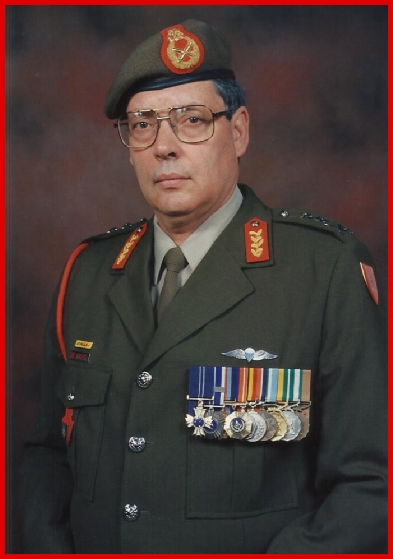
- Born: Calvinia, Cape Province
- Spouse: Henriette
- Military career
- Allegiance: South Africa
- Branch: South African Army
- Service years: 1965 – 1999
- Rank: Major General
- Service number: 01506948PE
- Commands: Deputy Chief of the SA Army; OC 61 Mechanised Battalion Group; OC South African Army College; GOC 7 South African Infantry Division; Chief of Joint Training Division
- Conflicts: Operation PROTEA (1981); Operation MODULER (1987); Operation PRONE (1988)
- Awards: Southern Cross Decoration SD Southern Cross Medal SM Military Merit Medal MMM Pro Patria Medal Southern Africa Medal General Service Medal (South Africa) Unitas (Unity) Medal Good Service Medal
- Other work: Businessman

Major General Roland de Vries SD SM MMM was a South African Army officer. He served as Deputy Chief of the South African Army before his retirement in 1999.

== Military career ==
Roland de Vries joined the South African Army in January 1963, was commissioned as an officer in April 1964 and retired as the Deputy Chief of the South African Army in April 1999. He served in various training and operational positions.

=== Command ===
He commanded amongst others, 61 Mechanised Battalion Group, the South African Army College, 7 South African Infantry Division and the Joint Training Division of the South African National Defence Force (SANDF).

=== Operations ===
His operational experience included various military operations in the former Rhodesia, South West Africa (Namibia) and Southern Angola. Some of these were Operation Protea (1981), Moduler (1987) and Prone (1988) in Southern Angola. The latter two mentioned high intensity conventional battles subsequently led to the peace accord being signed between South Africa, Angola and the Cubans in New York on 22 December 1988.

=== Ratel Programme ===
He was a major contributor to the development of the Ratel IFV infantry fighting vehicle and its subsequent combat system and doctrine during the seventies.

His book on mobile warfare, Mobile Warfare – a perspective for Southern Africa, was published during August 1987 in South Africa, while he was a colonel. This book outlined his thinking on the development of operational concepts and military doctrine for mobile conventional warfare within the Southern African context. He is credited with being the main driver behind these concepts within the South African Army.

=== With the SANDF ===
Gen de Vries led the Transformation Team of the newly created South African National Defence Force (SANDF) in 1997 in developing a new integrated Leadership, Command and Management Concept for the Department of Defence.

In 1997 he was appointed Chief of Joint Training and in 1998 as Deputy Chief of the SA Army. This role entailed developing a new military strategy for the SA Army as well as planning and managing the army's transformation process.

He retired as the Deputy Chief of the South African Army in April 1999.

=== Life outside the military ===
Gen de Vries is married to Henriette and they have four children Roland (Jnr), Elmarie, Melanie and Pieter.

He currently manages his own business, but remains engaged in advisory support for corporate security services and the transformation initiatives of armies in Africa. His memoirs, entitled Eye of the Firestorm, was published in May 2013.

== Awards and decorations ==
61 Mech Operational Service Badge (Service)
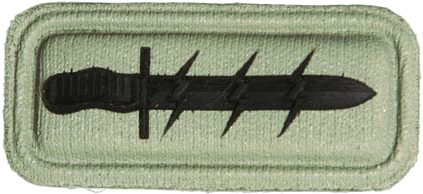
Black on Thatch beige, Embossed. Rectangular bar (upright) with a black dagger and three black lightning flashes angled diagonally across the blade

Free Fall Paratrooper (Qualification)
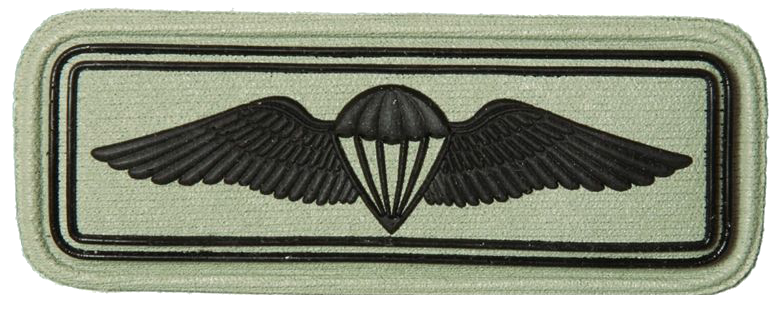
Advanced, Freefall. Black on Thatch beige. Small Black wings

General de Vries has been awarded the following:

- Southern Cross Decoration (SD)
- Southern Cross Medal (1975) (SM)
- Military Merit Medal (MMM)
- Pro Patria Medal
- Southern Africa Medal
- General Service Medal (South Africa)
- Unitas (Unity) Medal
- Good Service Medal (Gold (30 Years))
- Good Service Medal (Silver (20 Years))
- Good Service Medal (Bronze (10 Years))

Military offices
Preceded by Gilbert Ramano	Deputy Chief of the SA Army; 1998–1999	Vacant Title next held by Les Rudman in Oct 2011
New title Established in April 1997	Chief Joint Training; 1997–1998	Succeeded by Ashwin Hurribunce
Unknown	OC 7 SA Div; 1992–1995	Succeeded by Koos Laubscher
Preceded by Bertie Botha	OC SA Army College; 1987–1990	Succeeded by Anton van Graan
Unknown	Commander Formal Training Wing - Army Battle School; 1983–1985	Unknown
Preceded by Johann Dippenaar	OC 61 Mech Bn Gp; 1981–1982	Succeeded by Gert van Zyl
