= Operation Phoenix (South Africa) =

- Part of the South African Border War
- Location: Namibia Operation Phoenix (South Africa) (Namibia)
- Objective: SADF forces hunt a large incursion of PLAN fighters into the farmlands of northern South West Africa.
- Date: 15 February – 15 April 1983

Operation Phoenix was an operation in 1983 by the South African Defence Force and South West African Territorial Force in response to a major incursion by PLAN fighters from Angola into the white farming areas of northern South West Africa.

== Background ==
SWAPO's military wing PLAN had created a specialised infiltration unit called Volcano. Members of this unit had spent the second half of 1982 receiving training from East German, Cuban, and Soviet instructors and were regarded as best PLAN soldiers. By January 1983, 1000 to 1700 members of Volcano began the journey south to the Angolan/South West Africa border. They were then formed into fourteen companies of 50 to 70 soldiers. The mission was for thirteen of those companies, to cross the border and engage the SWATF and SADF forces while the last company would not engage those forces but instead head southwards to the white farming areas of northern South West Africa.

== Operation ==
On the 13 February 1983, the thirteen companies headed into Kaokoland, Ovamboland and Kavango. The fourteenth company headed for the white farmers in Kamanjab, Outjo, Tsumeb and Otjiwarongo areas. The South African forces operation began on 15 February when the incursions came to their attention. By the beginning of March the PLAN soldiers in the main force, who were kept busy by the SADF/SWATF forces, had taken 155 casualties but had succeeded in laying mines and attacking and kidnapping civilians. The small PLAN force, being chased by the South Africans, were now 50 km from the white farming areas. By early March, the smaller force had reached the farmlands and had attacked a homestead. But by early April, SADF/SWATF soldiers had caught up to the group and no PLAN fighters from the fourteenth unit were alive and had failed to achieve their objectives. The operation wound down with mopping-up operations and ended on 15 April.

== Aftermath ==
In the two-month operation 27 members of the SADF and SWATF lost their lives with PLAN's Volcano unit losing 309 fighters. Civilian casualties totalled 33 dead and 161 kidnapped and taken back to SWAPO bases in Angola.
