= 4 South African Infantry Battalion =

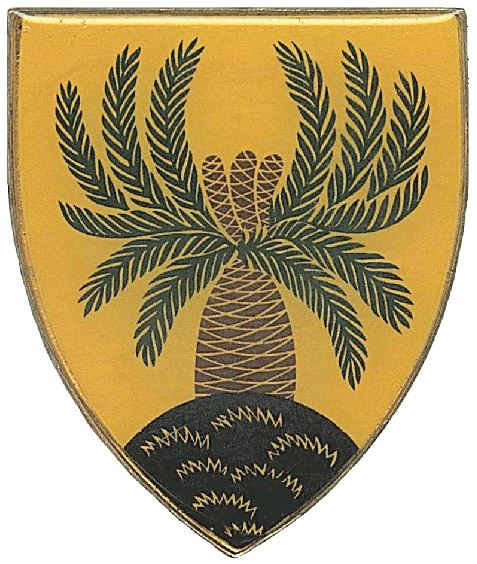
- 4 SAI emblem
- Active: 1 January 1962 to present
- Country: South Africa
- Branch: South African Army
- Type: Motorised infantry
- Part of: South African Infantry Formation
- Garrison/HQ: Middelburg, Mpumalanga
- Engagements: South African Border War

Commanders
- OC 1989 -1990: Commandant Izan Leibrand

Insignia
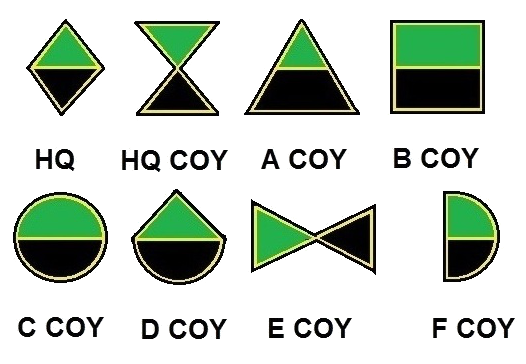
- Company level insignia

- SA Motorised Infantry beret bar circa 1992: SA Motorised Infantry beret bar

4 South African Infantry Battalion (also known as 4 SAI) is a motorised infantry unit of the South African Army.

== History ==
=== Pretoria Origins ===
4 SAI was established on 1 January 1962, at Voortrekkerhoogte in Pretoria, but within a month was moved to Middelburg, South Africa.

First troops began training in April 1962 and became an operational motorised unit in 1969.

=== From motorised to mechanised Infantry ===
By 1976 infantry operations transformed drastically when the Ratel Infantry Fighting Vehicle (IFV) was introduced for the first time and in November the first Ratel course was presented at 1 SAI. In 1982, 4 SAI converted to a mechanised infantry battalion mainly consisting of Ratel-20 IFVs.

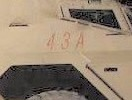
SADF 4 SAI Ratels were known for their conspicuous red call sign markings

Similar to 1 SAI, 4 SAI's mechanised leaders followed the same training route all students attended the course until the Section Leaders Phase had been completed. Section Leaders were then awarded their Lance Corporal stripes and then placed with regular rifle companies. The rest of the future NCOs also received their stripes and future Officers received their white Candidate Officer's tabs. These students were then evaluated and split into the Mechanised Platoon Commanders Course and Specialist Instructors Course. These platoon commanders were destined to either become future leaders of 8 SAIs rifle companies or instructors at the Training Wing, while the Specialist Instructors would become Officers and NCO's responsible for training of Ratel gunners and drivers.

- All students qualifying as Section Leaders were authorised to wear one parallel red bar above their two Corporal stripes.
- Students that qualified as Platoon NCOs were authorised to wear two parallel red bars. The Platoon NCOs were responsible for the support of the vehicles, guns and signal equipment of a specific platoon.
- Students that completed either the Platoon Commanders or Specialist Instructors Course were permitted to wear three parallel red bars above their stripes, signifying their platoon sergeant status. Platoon sergeants were responsible for the training and discipline of an allocated platoon.

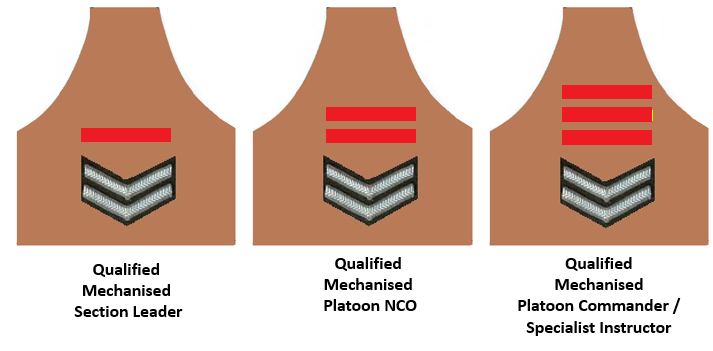
SADF era 4 SAI Mechanised Leader Brassards 1980s

=== Operations in Border War ===
4 SAI took part in many external operations during the South African border war such as:

- Dolfyn,
- Askari,
- Alpha Centauri,
- Moduler,
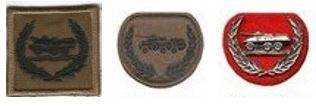
  Mechanised Operational Badge field and office versions issued after Moduler
- Hooper and
- Prone.

For these operations, 4 SAI became a detached unit supplying mechanised infantry to 62 Mechanised Battalion Group. An artillery battery of G5 howitzers, a Ratel-90 armoured car squadron and a in some operations, an Oilfant tank squadron was also temporarily attached to the battalion.

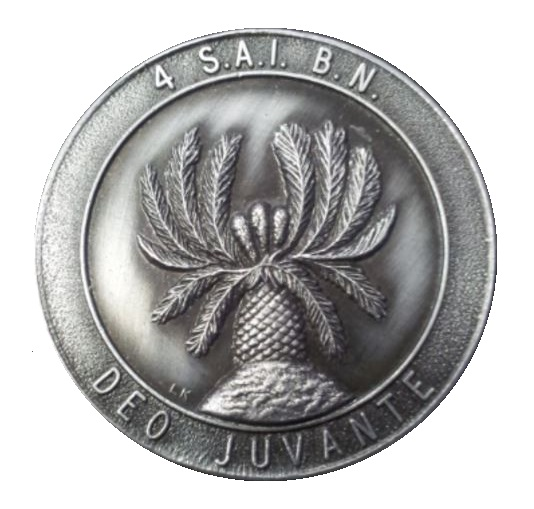
SADF 4 SAI medallion

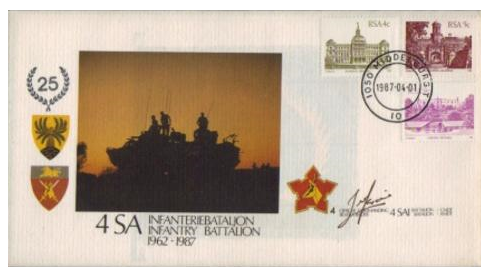
SADF era 4 SAI Commemorative Letter

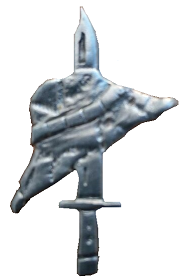
SADF Operation Hooper participation bar

=== Operations in South Africa ===
4 SAI also supported the signing of the Nkomati accord between South Africa and Mozambique in March 1984 and took part in Exercise Thunder Chariot in September of that year. The exercise was, at the time, billed as the largest mobilisation of South African forces since World War II.

=== Reverting to motorised infantry ===
4 SAI reverted to a motorised infantry unit after 1994.

== SANDF's Motorised Infantry ==
SANDF's Motorised Infantry is transported mostly by Samil trucks, Mamba APC's or other un-protected motor vehicles. Samil 20, 50 and 100 trucks transport soldiers, towing guns, and carrying equipment and supplies. Samil trucks are all-wheel drive, in order to have vehicles that function reliably in extremes of weather and terrain. Motorised Infantry have an advantage in mobility allowing them to move to critical sectors of the battlefield faster, allowing better response to enemy movements, as well as the ability to outmaneuver the enemy

== Leadership ==
Leadership
From	Honorary Colonel	To	Ribbon
	No known incumbents		
From	Officer Commanding	To	Ribbon
1988	Col Cassie Schoeman	c. 1989	
1989	Col Izan Leibrandt	c. 1992	
2008	Lt Col Thamsanqa Patrick Gosani	c. 2010	
2010	Lt Col Willie Lancelot Madikoto	c. nd	
2017	Lt Col Andries Matlaila	c. nd	
From	Regimental Sergeants Major	To	Ribbon
1987	WO1 w. Wiese	1989	
1989	WO1 D. De Wet	nd	
1995	WO1 De Morney	1999	

== Insignia ==
=== Previous Dress Insignia ===
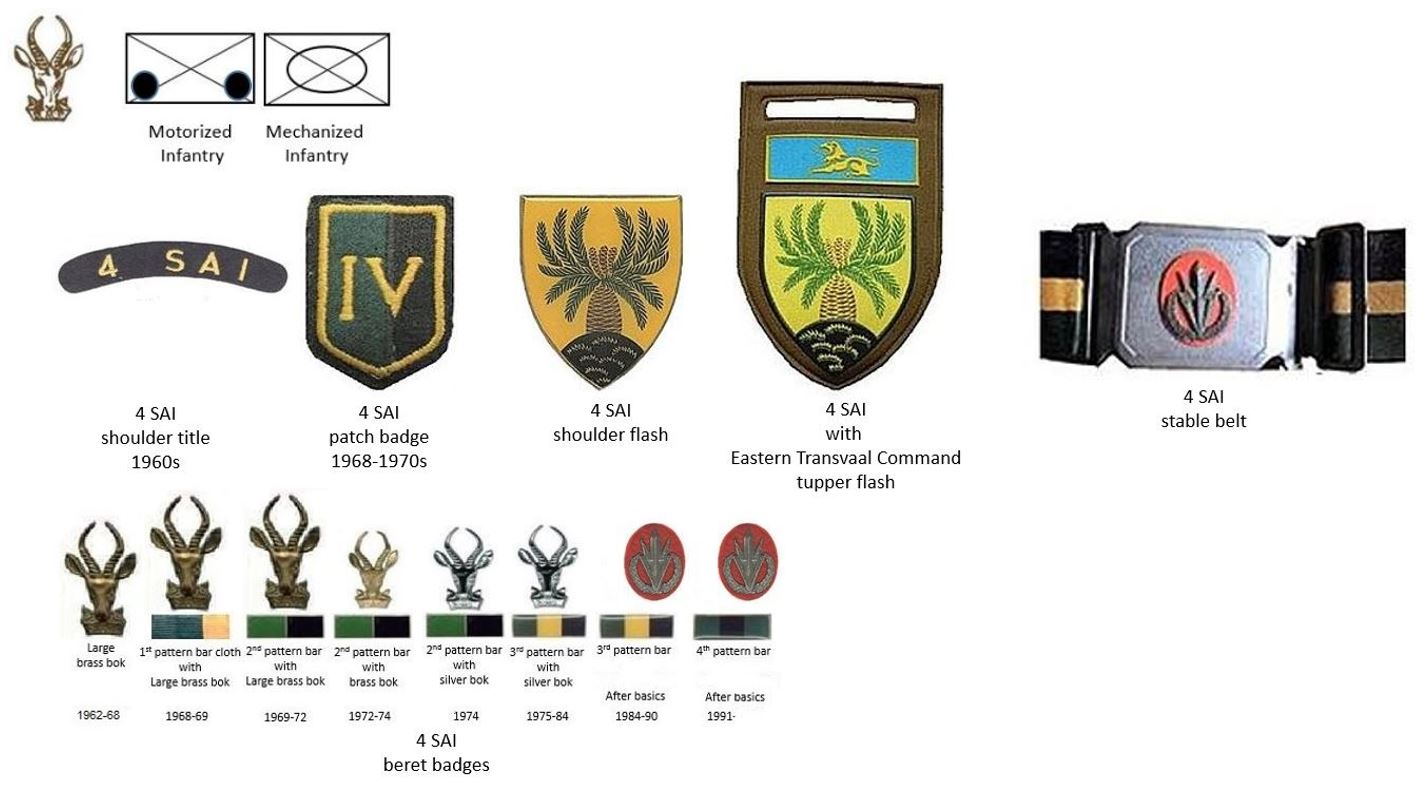
SADF era 4 SAI insignia

=== Current Dress Insignia ===
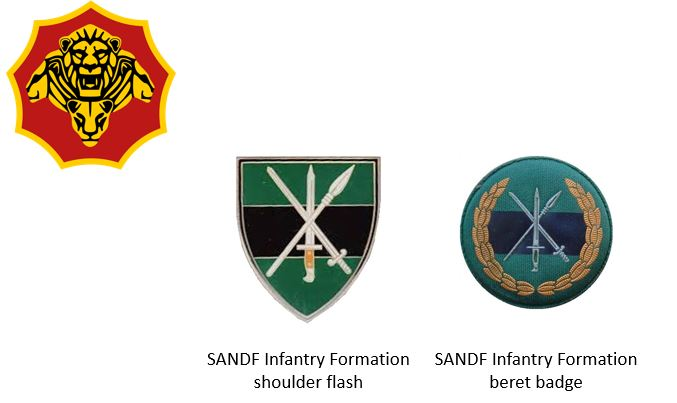
SANDF era Infantry Formation insignia
