= Battlegroup (army) =

Basic building block of a modern army's fighting force

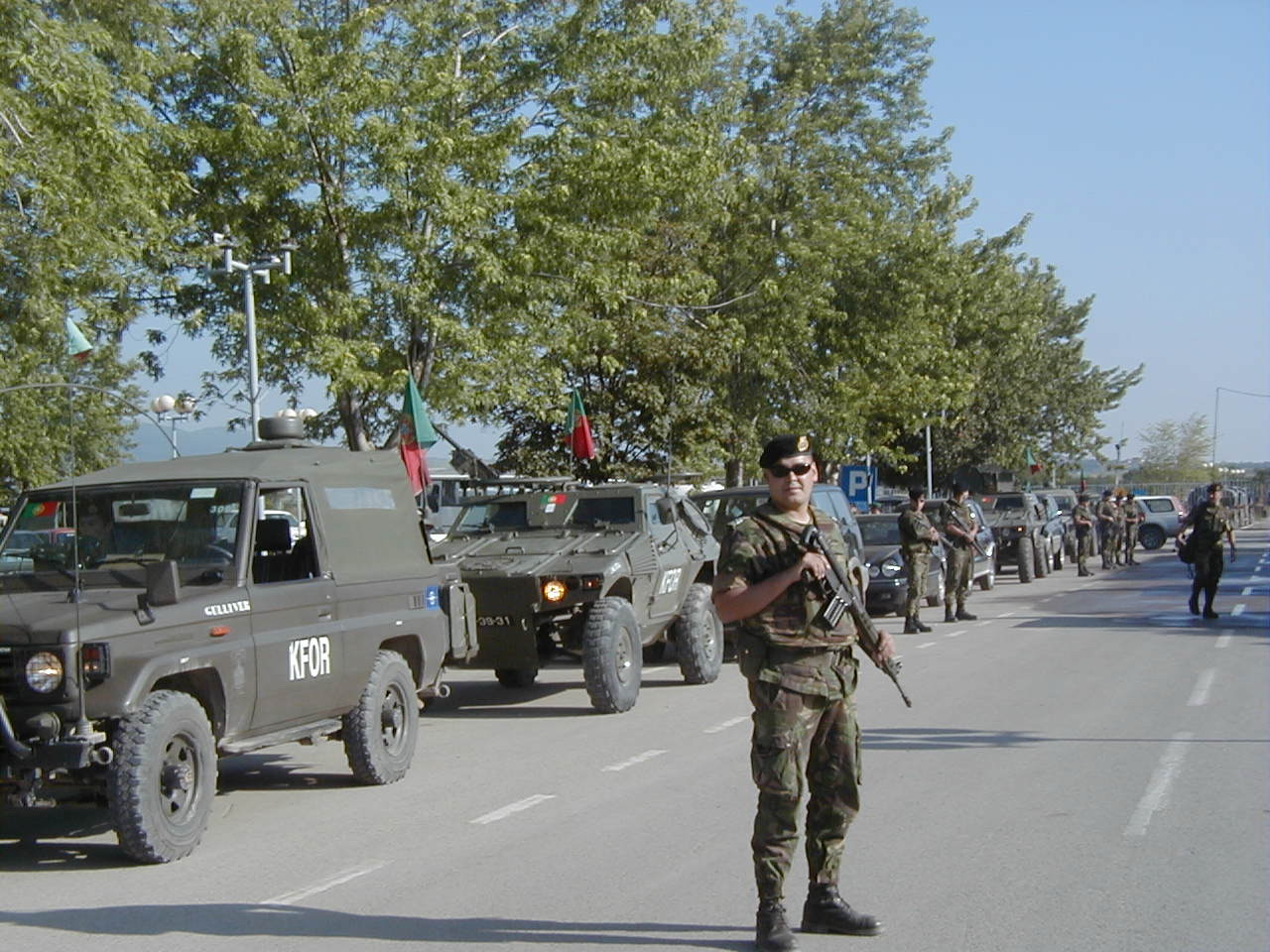
Task Force Pegasus of the Portuguese Army Grouping integrated into the NATO Peace Enforcement Mission in Kosovo

A battlegroup (British/Commonwealth term) or task force (U.S. term) in modern military theory is the basic building block of an army's fighting force. A battlegroup is formed around an infantry battalion or armoured regiment, which is usually commanded by a lieutenant colonel. The battalion or regiment also provides the command and staff element of a battlegroup, which is complemented with an appropriate mix of armour, infantry, and support personnel and weaponry relevant to the task it is expected to perform.

The organization of a battlegroup is flexible and can be restructured quickly to cope with any situation changes. Typically, an offensive battlegroup may be structured around an armoured regiment, with two squadrons of main battle tanks supported by an infantry company; conversely, a more defensive battlegroup may be structured around an infantry battalion, with two companies and an armoured squadron. In support would be a reconnaissance troop, a low-level air defence detachment, an anti-tank section, engineering detachment, and artillery support.

Battlegroups are often subdivided into company groups (called "teams" in the U.S. Army) consisting of a single infantry company supported by a tank troop and various other support units.

== India ==
India, with the adoption of the Cold Start Doctrine, has come up with independent brigade groups a little larger in composition than a task force. It is composition mix of all elements for specific war purpose against Pakistan. Offensive elements comprise independent armed brigade groups (usually composed of armour units) and independent offensive brigade groups (usually composed of infantry); the Indian Army has substantially reduced the time it took to deploy its forces on its borders.

== South Africa ==
In the South African Army development of semi-independent battlegroups developed mainly out of Task Force Juliet's experiences with a focus on high mobility speed and distance in the vastness of the South West African/Southern Angolan theater. These mechanized battlegroups resorted under 60 Brigade such as 61 Mechanised Battalion Group.

== United Kingdom and the Commonwealth ==
In the British Army, an armoured or mechanised division could expect to have as many as twelve separate battlegroups at its disposal, with three or four in each brigade. A Commonwealth battle group is usually named after its major constituent; for example, the Canadian Army's "1st Battalion, The Royal Canadian Regiment Battle Group" (shortened to "1 RCR Battle Group") on an operational tour of duty in Afghanistan in 2007–08, and the British Army's "3 Para Battle Group" that was operational in Afghanistan in 2011.

== Others ==
Most nations form battlegroups as required for operational or training purposes. When not deployed, the elements that would make up a battlegroup remain with their parent units. However, some nations maintain permanently formed battlegroups – a notable example is Norway, three of whose four major combat units are all-arms battlegroups.

== See also ==
- Battalion tactical group
- Battlegroup of the European Union
- Demi-brigade
- Kampfgruppe – original source of the term, in the German Army
