= 62 Mechanised Battalion Group =

62 Mechanised Infantry Battalion Group
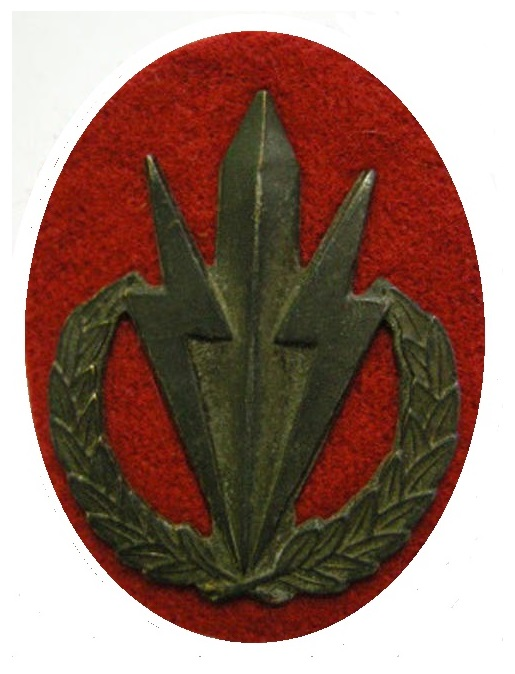
- 62 Mech emblem
- Active: 1982 – 1994
- Disbanded: 1989
- Country: South Africa
- Allegiance: South Africa
- Branch: South African Army
- Type: Mechanised Infantry Battalion Group
- Part of: South African Infantry Corps
- Garrison/HQ: Middelburg
- Nickname: 62 Mech
- Equipment: Ratel 20,60,81,90,12.7, EW; Ystervark 20mm Oerlikon Gun Vehicle mounted:10 Anti Aircraft Regiment, Bravo Battery, Youngsfield Cape; G5 howitzer; SAMIL Samil Various logistic support variants; Engineer Equipment; Rinkhals Ambulance
- Engagements: South African Border War

Commanders
- OC 1989: Commandant Izan Leibrand

62 Mechanised Infantry Battalion Group was a unit of the South African Army (SADF); although it was classed as mechanized infantry, it was a combined arms force consisting of a Mechanised Infantry Battalion forming the core of the group, Main Battle Tank Squadron, Armoured Car Squadron, Air-defence Battery, Engineer Squadron, Artillery Battery, specialists i.e. EW, MAOT, etc. and all the supporting staff and functions required for such a force.

== History ==
4 South African Infantry Battalion was transformed from a Motorised Infantry Battalion to a Mechanised Infantry Battalion in the early 1980s. The name 62 Mechanised Battalion Group was used to indicate when the unit was grouped with the other elements allocated to the battalion for conventional warfare, but was never formally approved as the unit name. This grouping only took place when the unit deployed for operational purposes as a mechanised force.

=== Operation Moduler ===
Designated Combat Group Charlie – Commandant Leon Marias.

- 9 November 1987: first attack against Cuban 16 Brigade that was in position around the source of the Chambinga River by Combat Group Charlie and its tanks. FAPLA ambush 62 Mech's left flank consisting of 3 tanks, various AA guns and APCs, 62 Mech prepare a counter-ambush by releasing its tank squadron and a mechanized company. Combat Group Charlie resumed its attack at against two FAPLA battalions with ten tanks and various AA guns but were pinned down when they received accurate enemy artillery fire and lose two soldiers. 62 Mech's tanks flanked to the right and engaged the enemy. By 11h00 Combat Group Charlie came under attack by Mig-23 attack aircraft. 62 Mech companies began to clear the bunkers and trenches and FAPLA forces started to flee and by 12h30 the main battle was over. At this point the commander of Combat Group Charlie ordered a withdrawal to the deployment point.
- 10 November 1987: Combat Group Charlie in position 15 km east of the Cunzumbia River. Around 15h00, it resumed its attack on 16 Brigade but at last light was unsuccessful after being slowed by MiG bombing attacks, observation of their attack by FAPLA reconnaissance and a shooting incident within the unit.
- 11 November 1987: The plan called for three attacks, but Charlie would lead the main attack from the south. Combat Group Charlie's attack resumed around 10h00 as it had again been held up by poor navigation through thick bush and MiG bombing runs taking one wounded and allowing FAPLA to withdraw some of it units in the south. They soon come up against two battalions, ten tanks and artillery. After resting Combat Group Charlie regained the momentum around 12h25 when six Mirages bombed 16 Brigade positions but were then counter-attacked by the enemy infantry and artillery which was beaten back with the loss of 2 killed and eight wounded. Combat Group Charlie resumed the attack supplemented with Ratel-90 and tanks and drew heavy enemy artillery and MRLs before getting stuck in minefields. Combat Group Charlie was then ordered to withdraw around 15h30 being short of ammunition.
- 14 November 1987: Combat Group Charlie was ordered to move rapidly 20 km south-west to trap and prevent two FAPLA units from crossing the Vimpulo into the ground between the Vimpulo and Humbe Rivers. Joined by Combat Group Alpha, the two units catch 21 Brigade, slowed by G5 artillery, around 16h00 but FAPLA evaded them. Combat Group Charlie was ordered to move into within 2 km of the crossing point to ambush 21 Brigade.

=== Operation Agree ===
62 Mech actively participated, on a permanent basis, in the operations carried out in SWA from June 1988 to November 1989 as part of 60 Brigade. The complete battle group was effectively deployed to the operational area from September 1987 to November 1989. Various bases were used for the HQ, i.e. Etale, Namibia, Eenhana, Ondangwa, Okatope and Rooikop (Walvisbay).

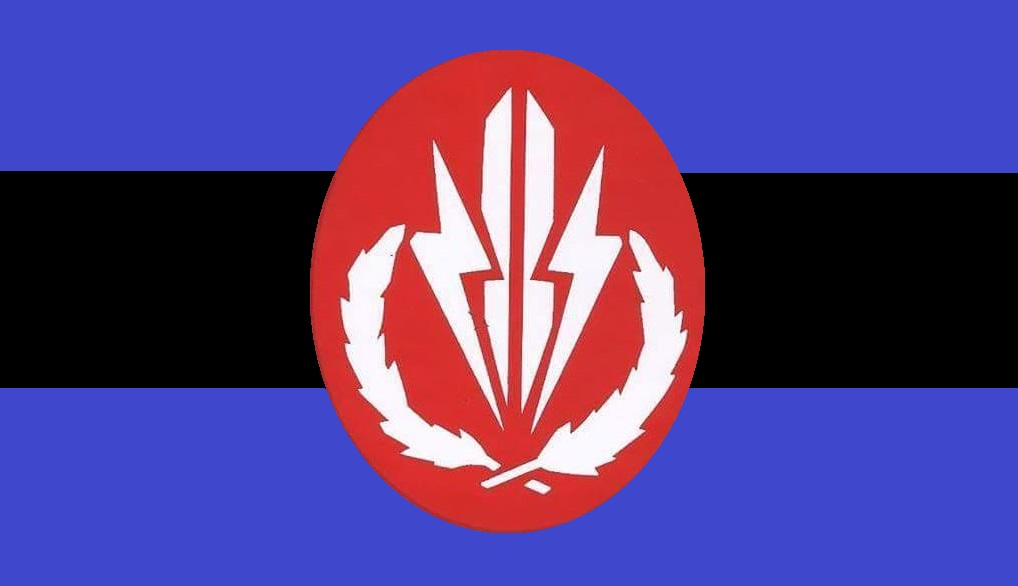
SADF 62 Mechanised Battalion Flag and identification insignia on Ratel vehicles

62 Mech Group withdrew with the majority of SADF Forces from Namibia on 31 Nov 1989.

The badge for the operational battle group was the same as 4 SAI's beret badge. The G5 Battery was named Quebec Battery which was 42 Battery or 142 Battery depending on if it was 4 Artillery or 14 Artillery Regiment that was supplying the personnel.

== Disbandment ==
The allocated elements returned to their respective mother units. This took place in 1989 after the withdrawal from South West Africa.

== Other sources ==
- de Vries, Roland (13 November 2015). "THE INFLUENCE OF THE RATEL INFANTRY FIGHTING VEHICLE ON MOBILE WARFARE IN SOUTHERN AFRICA". Scientia Militaria: South African Journal of Military Studies. 43 (2). doi:10.5787/43-2-1129. ISSN 2224-0020.
- Steenkamp, Willem; Heitman, Helmoed Roemer (2016). Mobility Conquers: The Story Of 61 Mechanised Battalion Group 1978-2005 (Hardcover). Helion & Company (published 1 September 2016). ISBN 978-1-911096-52-8.
- Scholtz, Leopold (2013). The SADF in the Border War 1966-1989. Cape Town: Tafelberg. p. 544. ISBN 9780624054108.
- OOSTHUIZEN, Gerhard J.J. (November 2014). "THE SOUTH AFRICAN DEFENCE FORCE AND OPERATION HOOPER, SOUTHEAST ANGOLA, DECEMBER 1987 TO MARCH 1988". Scientia Militaria: South African Journal of Military Studies. 42 (2). doi:10.5787/42-2-1095. ISSN 2224-0020.
- Davies, R. Mark. South African Forces in the Border War (Angola and South West Africa) 1980 to 1989 (pdf).
