= Basketball at the 2011 Summer Universiade – Men's tournament =

The men's tournament of Basketball at the 2011 Summer Universiade at China began on August 13 and ended on August 22.

== Teams ==
Americas	Asia	Europe	Oceania	Host nation
Brazil; Canada; Mexico; USA	Hong Kong; Japan; Philippines; South Korea; UAE	Czech Republic; Finland; Germany; Hungary; Israel; Lithuania; Romania; Russia; Serbia; Turkey; Ukraine	Australia; New Zealand	China

== Preliminary round ==
=== Group A ===
Team	Pld	W	L	PF	PA	PD	Pts.
Germany	5	5	0	355	260	+95	10
Romania	5	3	2	387	336	+51	8
Czech Republic	5	3	2	385	338	+47	8
Brazil	5	3	2	399	347	+52	8
China	5	1	4	341	425	−84	6
UAE	5	0	5	268	429	−161	5

August 13, 2011
20:30

Report

China	85–80	UAE
Scoring by quarter: 24–27, 24–10, 11–20, 26–23
Pts: Gu 25; Rebs: Zhang, Li 11; Asts: Shi, Ren J, Li, Chang 1		Pts: Al Zaabi 27; Rebs: Al Zaabi 9 Asts: Al Zaabi 4

Main Gymnasium of Universiade Center, Shenzhen
Referees: Jurgis Lauranovicius (Lithuania)

August 13, 2011
20:30

Report

Germany	66–63 (OT)	Czech Republic
Scoring by quarter: 23–13, 8–15, 9–14, 15–13, Overtime: 11–8
Pts: Tadda 16; Rebs: Schmidt 13; Asts: Simon 2		Pts: Auda 16; Rebs: Slavik 10; Asts: Moravec, Hruban, Auda 1

Shenzhen Luohu Gymnasium, Shenzhen
Referees: Tomasz Kudlicki (Poland)

August 13, 2011
20:30

Report

Brazil	77–74 (OT)	Romania
Scoring by quarter: 15–17, 20–10, 17–23, 18–20, Overtime: 7–4
Pts: Ansaloni 15; Rebs: Ansaloni, Nogueira 8 Asts: Chaia 6		Pts: Moldoveanu 25; Rebs: Mandache 10; Asts: Mandache, Nicoara 4

Gymnasium of Pingshan Sports Center, Shenzhen
Referees: Brazildley Jon Giersch (Australia)

August 14, 2011
12:30

Report

Romania	60–71	Germany
Scoring by quarter: 11–16, 10–13, 13–23, 26–19
Pts: Moldoveanu 16; Rebs: Moldoveanu, Nicoara 6 Asts: seven players 1		Pts: Doreth 15; Rebs: Fassler, Seiferth, Wohlfarth-Bottermann 5 Asts: Simon 4

Main Gymnasium of Universiade Center, Shenzhen
Referees: Sergey Krug (Russia)

August 14, 2011
20:30

Report

Czech Republic	75–55	China
Scoring by quarter: 15–12, 16–13, 19–17, 25–13
Pts: Dokoupil 20; Rebs: Slavík 12; Asts: Macela 5		Pts: Znang 15; Rebs: Znang 11; Asts: Ren JW, Znang 3

Main Gymnasium of Universiade Center, Shenzhen
Referees: Scott Paul Beker (Australia)

August 14, 2011
20:30

Report

Brazil	103–57	UAE
Scoring by quarter: 23–20, 30–6, 26–18, 24–13
Pts: Ansaloni 21; Rebs: Nogueira 9 Asts: Machado 6		Pts: Al Zaabi 30; Rebs: Al Zaabi 6 Asts: Salem 3

Gymnasium of the Senior High Division of Shenzhen Foreign Languages School, Shenzhen
Referees: Jurgis Lauranovicius (Lithuania)

August 15, 2011
20:30

Report

China	70–97	Brazil
Scoring by quarter: 20–32, 23–19, 15–26, 12–20
Pts: Shi 16; Rebs: Li 6 Asts: Shi 6		Pts: Machado 27; Rebs: Silva 8 Asts: Machado 5

Main Gymnasium of Universiade Center, Shenzhen
Referees: Oscar Lefwerth (Sweden)

August 15, 2011
20:30

Report

Czech Republic	71–87	Romania
Scoring by quarter: 8–19, 23–21, 25–22, 15–25
Pts: Auda 21; Rebs: Auda 8 Asts: Moravec, Hruban, Auda 1		Pts: Moldoveanu 24; Rebs: Nicoara 10; Asts: Popescu 2

Shenzhen Luohu Gymnasium, Shenzhen
Referees: Richard Ivan Stehlik (Canada)

August 15, 2011
20:30

Report

UAE	33–82	Germany
Scoring by quarter: 11–15, 8–26, 5–24, 9–17
Pts: Al Zaabi 11; Rebs: Abdalla 6 Asts: Ahmed, Abdalla 1		Pts: Lischka 17; Rebs: Wohlfahrt-Bottermann 9 Asts: Fassler 3

Gymnasium of Pingshan Sports Center, Shenzhen
Referees: Shigeyuki Arisawa (Japan)

August 17, 2011
20:30

Report

Romania	98–80	China
Scoring by quarter: 29–19, 15–21, 30–20, 24–20
Pts: Moldoveanu 26; Rebs: Nicoara 9 Asts: Popescu 8		Pts: Li 31; Rebs: Ren Jf 7 Asts: Shi 5

Main Gymnasium of Universiade Center, Shenzhen
Referees: Scott Paul Beker (Australia)

August 17, 2011
20:30

Report

Germany	61–53	Brazil
Scoring by quarter: 16–19, 17–8, 21–15, 7–11
Pts: Doreth, Spoeler 13; Rebs: Tadda, Wohlfahrt-Bottermann, Schmidt 8 Asts: Doreth 2		Pts: Melo, Machado 13; Rebs: Melo, Nogueira, Machado 5 Asts: Machado 7

Shenzhen Luohu Gymnasium, Shenzhen
Referees: Petri Mäntylä (Finland)

August 17, 2011
20:30

Report

UAE	61–91	Czech Republic
Scoring by quarter: 18–22, 12–21, 21–26, 10–22
Pts: Al Braiki 13; Rebs: Abdalla 10; Asts: Al Zaabi, Abdalla 2		Pts: Hruban 23; Rebs: Jelinek 15; Asts: Dokoupil 5

Gymnasium of Pingshan Sports Center, Shenzhen
Referees: Sergey Krug (Russia)

August 18, 2011
12:30

Report

Brazil	69–85	Czech Republic
Scoring by quarter: 10–18, 22–26, 13–8, 24–33
Pts: Ansaloni 21; Rebs: Silva 6 Asts: Machado 2		Pts: Dokoupil 22; Rebs: Jelinek 6 Asts: Macela 4

Main Gymnasium of Universiade Center, Shenzhen
Referees: Milija Vojinovic (Serbia)

August 18, 2011
18:00

Report

China	51–75	Germany
Scoring by quarter: 18–16, 10–17, 9–25, 14–17
Pts: Li 15; Rebs: Li 11; Asts: no assist		Pts: Lischka 15; Rebs: Wohlfahrt-Bottermann 9 Asts: Doreth, Fassler 2

Main Gymnasium of Universiade Center, Shenzhen
Referees: Boris Gabara (Slovakia)

August 18, 2011
18:00

Report

UAE	37–68	Romania
Scoring by quarter: 13–22, 7–9, 10–20, 7–17
Pts: Alameri, Abdalla 10; Rebs: Abdalla 7 Asts: Salem, Alshabeni, Abdalla 1		Pts: Moldoveanu 20; Rebs: Moldoveanu 18; Asts: Gutoaia, Nicoară 3

Gymnasium of the Senior High Division of Shenzhen Foreign Languages School, Shenzhen
Referees: Rafael Ganiev (Russia)

=== Group B ===
Team	Pld	W	L	PF	PA	PD	Pts.
Canada	4	3	1	299	255	+44	7
Serbia	4	3	1	325	219	+106	7
Turkey	4	2	2	277	300	−23	6
Australia	4	2	2	307	266	+41	6
Hong Kong	4	0	4	204	372	−178	4

August 13, 2011
10:00

Report

Serbia	72–67	Australia
Scoring by quarter: 16–7, 15–14, 18–20, 23–26
Pts: Ljubičić, Štimac 17; Rebs: Ljubičić 8 Asts: Jeremić 4		Pts: Iliadis 14; Rebs: Hodgson 6 Asts: Maynard, Broekhoff, Gliddon 2

Shenzhen Luohu Gymnasium, Shenzhen
Referees: Boris Schmid (Germany)

August 13, 2011
10:00

Report

Turkey	75–85 (OT)	Canada
Scoring by quarter: 24–20, 17–16, 13–22, 19–15, Overtime: 2–12
Pts: Batuk 23; Rebs: Paçun 14; Asts: Paçun 3		Pts: Hobin 16; Rebs: Hobin 10; Asts: Jones 5

Gymnasium of Pingshan Sports Center, Shenzhen
Referees: Oscar Lefwerth (France)

August 14, 2011
12:30

Report

Hong Kong	57–84	Turkey
Scoring by quarter: 9–13, 8–25, 17–27, 23–19
Pts: Lee Ki 20; Rebs: Tsoi 8 Asts: four players 1		Pts: Batuk 19; Rebs: Isik 7 Asts: Yildirim, Gen, Ozcan 3

Shenzhen Luohu Gymnasium, Shenzhen
Referees: Chris Dodds (Scotland)

August 14, 2011
20:30

Report

Canada	70–67	Serbia
Scoring by quarter: 22–23, 14–20, 19–8, 15–16
Pts: Ward, Hinz 14; Rebs: Lieffers 8 Asts: Hinz 3		Pts: Lučić 25; Rebs: Lučić 8 Asts: Ljubičić 4

Shenzhen Luohu Gymnasium, Shenzhen
Referees: Petri Mäntylä (Finland)

August 16, 2011
12:30

Report

Australia	103–51	Hong Kong
Scoring by quarter: 29–11, 31–15, 28–12, 15–13
Pts: Broekhoff, Dowdell 19; Rebs: Iliadis, Gynes 7 Asts: four players 3		Pts: Lee Ki 14; Rebs: Chan, Wong 6 Asts: Wong 2

Main Gymnasium of Universiade Center, Shenzhen
Referees: Chris Dodds (Scotland)

August 16, 2011
12:30

Report

Serbia	84–36	Turkey
Scoring by quarter: 26–8, 19–6, 18–15, 21–7
Pts: Birčević 16; Rebs: Birčević 11; Asts: Ljubičić 5		Pts: Paçun 9 Rebs: Paçun 5 Asts: Yildirim 3

Shenzhen Luohu Gymnasium, Shenzhen
Referees: Oscar Lefwerth (Sweden)

August 17, 2011
10:00

Report

Hong Kong	46–102	Serbia
Scoring by quarter: 10–25, 6–20, 22–27, 8–30
Pts: Chan 17; Rebs: Lee Ki 4 Asts: Lau 2		Pts: Živanović 14; Rebs: Cvetinovic 10; Asts: Ljubičić 4

Main Gymnasium of Universiade Center, Shenzhen
Referees: Rafael Ganiev (Russia)

August 17, 2011
10:00

Report

Australia	63–61	Canada
Scoring by quarter: 16–10, 21–15, 12–16, 14–20
Pts: Gliddon 19; Rebs: Dowdell 6 Asts: Daly 3		Pts: Hinz 22; Rebs: Lieffers 8 Asts: Yu, Hobin, Hinz 2

Shenzhen Luohu Gymnasium, Shenzhen
Referees: Oscar Lefwerth (Sweden)

August 18, 2011
12:30

Report

Turkey	82–74	Australia
Scoring by quarter: 19–20, 23–13, 18–20, 22–21
Pts: Yildirim 22; Rebs: Ozcan 7 Asts: Ozcan 2		Pts: Iliadis, Broekhoff 16; Rebs: Dowdell 11; Asts: Maynard, Dowdell 3

Shenzhen Luohu Gymnasium, Shenzhen
Referees: Boris Schmidt (Germany)

August 18, 2011
18:00

Report

Canada	83–50	Hong Kong
Scoring by quarter: 14–14, 26–8, 20–12, 23–16
Pts: Ward 17; Rebs: Bakovic 9 Asts: Phillip 5		Pts: Mok, Chan 8 Rebs: Mok, Lau 5 Asts: Lee SW 3

Shenzhen Luohu Gymnasium, Shenzhen
Referees: Petri Mäntylä (Finland)

=== Group C ===
Team	Pld	W	L	PF	PA	PD	Pts.
Russia	5	5	0	428	272	+156	10
Lithuania	5	4	1	430	359	+71	9
Ukraine	5	3	2	374	325	+49	8
Japan	5	2	3	429	402	+27	7
New Zealand	5	1	4	368	393	−25	6
Philippines	5	0	5	251	539	−278	5

August 13, 2011
12:30

Report

Russia	78–42	New Zealand
Scoring by quarter: 21–12, 13–13, 21–9, 23–8
Pts: Gubanov 20; Rebs: Golovin 10; Asts: Golovin 6		Pts: Alexander 17; Rebs: Prewster 6 Asts: Bloxham 2

Main Gymnasium of Universiade Center, Shenzhen
Referees: Richard Ivan Stehlik (Canada)

August 13, 2011
12:30

Report

Lithuania	108–59	Philippines
Scoring by quarter: 30–23, 22–21, 24–11, 32–4
Pts: Orelik 29; Rebs: Zyle, Jucikas, Orelik 9 Asts: Sapiega 5		Pts: Juliane, Fajardo 16; Rebs: Fajardo 7 Asts: Juliane 3

Shenzhen Luohu Gymnasium, Shenzhen
Referees: Milija Vojinovic (Serbia)

August 13, 2011
12:30

Report

Japan	67–85	Ukraine
Scoring by quarter: 5–26, 15–24, 28–17, 19–18
Pts: Kanamaru 23; Rebs: Nagayoshi 8 Asts: Shinoyama, Hiejima 2		Pts: Zaytsev 18; Rebs: Zaytsev 14; Asts: Burenko 4

Gymnasium of Pingshan Sports Center, Shenzhen
Referees: Marius Udrica (Romania)

August 14, 2011
12:30

Report

Ukraine	55–71	Lithuania
Scoring by quarter: 18–17, 9–8, 11–20, 17–26
Pts: Korniienko 16; Rebs: Korniienko 10; Asts: Slipenchuk 4		Pts: Orelik 17; Rebs: Stanionis 8 Asts: Sapiega 5

Gymnasium of Pingshan Sports Center, Shenzhen
Referees: Richard Ivan Stehlik (Canada)

August 14, 2011
15:30

Report

Japan	88–81	New Zealand
Scoring by quarter: 25–17, 19–19, 25–21, 19–24
Pts: Ono 21; Rebs: Nagayoshi 5 Asts: Watanabe 5		Pts: Edwards 31; Rebs: Edwards 9 Asts: Alexander, Prewster 4

Gymnasium of Pingshan Sports Center, Shenzhen
Referees: Jacob Cassimiro Barreto (Brazil)

August 14, 2011
20:30

Report

Philippines	47–105	Russia
Scoring by quarter: 13–23, 15–18, 12–35, 7–29
Pts: Gomez, Fajardo 8 Rebs: Pao 7 Asts: Bercede, Juliane 1		Pts: Nelyubov 21; Rebs: Nelyubov 11; Asts: Savelyev 4

Gymnasium of Pingshan Sports Center, Shenzhen
Referees: Robert Paulik (Czech Republic)

August 16, 2011
10:00

Report

Russia	91–73	Japan
Scoring by quarter: 25–27, 18–8, 25–21, 23–17
Pts: Golovin 18; Rebs: Golovin 10; Asts: Golovin, Smygin 3		Pts: Furukawa 18; Rebs: Harimoto 6 Asts: four players 2

Main Gymnasium of Universiade Center, Shenzhen
Referees: Scott Paul Beker (Australia)

August 16, 2011
10:00

Report

Philippines	46–102	Ukraine
Scoring by quarter: 13–21, 11–16, 11–30, 11–35
Pts: Juliane 13; Rebs: Pao 7 Asts: Pao 3		Pts: Korniienko 18; Rebs: Korniienko 13; Asts: Slipenchuk 7

Shenzhen Luohu Gymnasium, Shenzhen
Referees: Omer Esteron (Israel)

August 16, 2011
12:30

Report

New Zealand	79–88	Lithuania
Scoring by quarter: 25–17, 21–18, 17–18, 16–35
Pts: Prewster 19; Rebs: Prewster 10; Asts: Bloxham, Prewster 2		Pts: Valukonis 27; Rebs: Valukonis 9 Asts: Peciukevicius 5

Gymnasium of Pingshan Sports Center, Shenzhen
Referees: Boris Schmidt (Germany)

August 17, 2011
12:30

Report

Ukraine	48–77	Russia
Scoring by quarter: 9–21, 10–16, 16–25, 13–15
Pts: Korniienko 16; Rebs: Tymofeyenko, Zaytsev 5 Asts: Slipenchuk 3		Pts: Golovin, Gubanov 15; Rebs: Golovin, Mateyunas, Gubanov 6 Asts: Golovin, Mateyunas 3

Main Gymnasium of Universiade Center, Shenzhen
Referees: Milija Vojinovic (Serbia)

August 17, 2011
12:30

Report

Lithuania	101–89	Japan
Scoring by quarter: 34–22, 27–22, 18–21, 22–24
Pts: Valukonis 27; Rebs: Orelik 11; Asts: Kadzevicius 6		Pts: Ono 19; Rebs: Furukawa 4 Asts: Shinoyama 4

Shenzhen Luohu Gymnasium, Shenzhen
Referees: Robert Paulik (Czech Republic)

August 17, 2011
12:30

Report

New Zealand	102–55	Philippines
Scoring by quarter: 16–12, 32–10, 28–14, 26–19
Pts: Edwards 24; Rebs: Edwards 10; Asts: Mills 4		Pts: Pao, Fajardo 11; Rebs: Fajardo 7 Asts: Juliane 2

Gymnasium of Pingshan Sports Center, Shenzhen
Referees: Zoltán Palla (Hungary)

August 18, 2011
12:30

Report

Japan	112–44	Philippines
Scoring by quarter: 28–11, 32–12, 26–9, 26–12
Pts: Tanaka 21; Rebs: Harimoto 8 Asts: Watanabe 6		Pts: Gomez, Fajardo 12; Rebs: Pao, Fajardo 6 Asts: Pao 3

Gymnasium of Pingshan Sports Center, Shenzhen
Referees: Robert Vyklicky (Czech Republic)

August 18, 2011
15:30

Report

New Zealand	64–84	Ukraine
Scoring by quarter: 12–18, 17–25, 13–21, 22–20
Pts: Edwards 20; Rebs: Prewster 6 Asts: Prewster 2		Pts: Zaytsev 19; Rebs: Tymofeyenko 8 Asts: Otverchenko 7

Gymnasium of Pingshan Sports Center, Shenzhen
Referees: Robert Paulik (Czech Republic)

August 18, 2011
18:00

Report

Russia	77–62	Lithuania
Scoring by quarter: 17–12, 17–18, 17–15, 26–17
Pts: Nelyubov 18; Rebs: Nelyubov 10; Asts: Zaitsev, Gubanov 3		Pts: Zyle 22; Rebs: Zyle 6 Asts: Peciukevicius 6

Gymnasium of Pingshan Sports Center, Shenzhen
Referees: Bradley Jon Giersch (Australia)

=== Group D ===
Team	Pld	W	L	PF	PA	PD	Pts.
United States	5	5	0	540	336	+204	10
Finland	5	3	2	358	389	−31	8
Mexico	5	3	2	399	423	−24	8
Israel	5	2	3	367	385	−18	7
South Korea	5	2	3	415	450	−35	7
Hungary	5	0	5	314	410	−96	5

August 13, 2011
18:00

Report

United States	108–67	Mexico
Scoring by quarter: 22–24, 21–13, 31–16, 34–14
Pts: Gibbs 20; Rebs: Mbakwe 10; Asts: Gibbs, Jenkins, Johnson 3		Pts: Giron 13; Rebs: Delgado 6 Asts: Martin del Campo, Cheda, Cruz 2

Main Gymnasium of Universiade Center, Shenzhen
Referees: Scott Paul Beker (Australia)

August 13, 2011
1800

Report

Israel	67–60	Hungary
Scoring by quarter: 16–20, 22–10, 16–13, 13–17
Pts: Karni 15; Rebs: Karni 10; Asts: Reis, Bet Yosef 2		Pts: Szabó 14; Rebs: Morgen 5 Asts: Helmeczi 3

Shenzhen Luohu Gymnasium, Shenzhen
Referees: Mindaugas Vecerskis (Lithuania)

August 13, 2011
18:00

Report

South Korea	92–71	Finland
Scoring by quarter: 17–20, 27–17, 29–16, 19–18
Pts: Lee HJ 31; Rebs: Lee SH 10; Asts: Kim MG 9		Pts: Kanervo 19; Rebs: Heinonen 8 Asts: Nikkarinen 4

Gymnasium of Pingshan Sports Center, Shenzhen
Referees: Rafael Ganiev (Russia)

August 14, 2011
12:30

Report

Finland	72–57	Israel
Scoring by quarter: 21–13, 14–18, 18–12, 19–14
Pts: Heinonen 15; Rebs: Heinonen 8 Asts: Niemi, Kanervo 1		Pts: Daniel 15; Rebs: Pitsnon 11; Asts: Karni 2

Gymnasium of the Senior High Division of Shenzhen Foreign Languages School, Shenzhen
Referees: Marius Udrica (Romania)

August 14, 2011
15:30

Report

Hungary	53–102	United States
Scoring by quarter: 6–21, 13–37, 6–26, 28–18
Pts: Morgen 13; Rebs: Morgen 9 Asts: Kovács 3		Pts: Jenkins 20; Rebs: Mbakwe 9 Asts: Gibbs 4

Main Gymnasium of Universiade Center, Shenzhen
Referees: Carlos Mateus (France)

August 14, 2011
15:30

Report

South Korea	96–107	Mexico
Scoring by quarter: 25–26, 26–20, 24–25, 21–36
Pts: Choi BK 32; Rebs: Kim MG 8 Asts: Lee JH 5		Pts: Giron 32; Rebs: Martin del Campo 7 Asts: Cruz 6

Gymnasium of the Senior High Division of Shenzhen Foreign Languages School, Shenzhen
Referees: Hu Ji (China)

August 15, 2011
15:30

Report

United States	112–68	South Korea
Scoring by quarter: 24–19, 31–23, 26–12, 31–14
Pts: J Green 17; Rebs: D Green 12; Asts: Gibbs 4		Pts: Kim MG 12; Rebs: Kim MG 8 Asts: Cha BW 3

Main Gymnasium of Universiade Center, Shenzhen
Referees: Jacob Cassimiro Barreto (Brazil)

August 15, 2011
15:30

Report

Hungary	54–78	Finland
Scoring by quarter: 15–20, 13–18, 14–14, 12–26
Pts: P Kovács 10; Rebs: Supola 7 Asts: Mohácsi, Szabó 2		Pts: Nuutinen 22; Rebs: Heinonen, Lindbom 5 Asts: Kanervo, Lindbom, Vanttaja 1

Shenzhen Luohu Gymnasium, Shenzhen
Referees: Tomasz Kudlicki (Poland)

August 15, 2011
18:00

Report

Mexico	77–72	Israel
Scoring by quarter: 23–19, 13–22, 18–16, 23–15
Pts: Giron 21; Rebs: Cruz 8 Asts: Martin del Campo, Cruz, Giron 2		Pts: Shoutvin 20; Rebs: Harush 11; Asts: Eytan, Harush 2

Gymnasium of Pingshan Sports Center, Shenzhen
Referees: Milija Vojinovic (Serbia)

August 17, 2011
18:00

Report

Finland	64–124	United States
Scoring by quarter: 19–31, 19–32, 13–37, 13–24
Pts: Kanervo 20; Rebs: Heinonen, Lindbom 4 Asts: Pounds, Kanervo, Nikkarinen 2		Pts: J Green 21; Rebs: D Green 9 Asts: four players 3

Main Gymnasium of Universiade Center, Shenzhen
Referees: Chris Dodds (Scotland)

August 17, 2011
18:00

Report

Israel	87–82	South Korea
Scoring by quarter: 20–18, 14–22, 23–20, 30–22
Pts: Reis 30; Rebs: Reis, Shoutvin 7 Asts: Simhon, Shulman 3		Pts: Lee JH 39; Rebs: Lee SH 11; Asts: Lee JH 5

Shenzhen Luohu Gymnasium, Shenzhen
Referees: Boris Schmidt (Germany)

August 17, 2011
18:00

Report

Mexico	86–74	Hungary
Scoring by quarter: 22–19, 15–22, 27–10, 22–23
Pts: Martin del Campo 24; Rebs: Martin del Campo 6 Asts: Martin del Campo, Cruz 4		Pts: Morgen 16; Rebs: Vas 9 Asts: Somogyi, Á Kovács 4

Gymnasium of Pingshan Sports Center, Shenzhen
Referees: Richard Ivan Stehlik (Canada)

August 18, 2011
12:30

Report

South Korea	77–73	Hungary
Scoring by quarter: 23–17, 19–14, 19–16, 16–26
Pts: Jang JS 21; Rebs: Choi BK 11; Asts: Kim MG 10		Pts: Morgen 22; Rebs: Morgen 17; Asts: Á Kovács 5

Gymnasium of the Senior High Division of Shenzhen Foreign Languages School, Shenzhen
Referees: Tomasz Kudlicki (Poland)

August 18, 2011
15:30

Report

United States	94–84	Israel
Scoring by quarter: 27–23, 14–20, 29–19, 24–22
Pts: J Green 16; Rebs: Mbakwe 13; Asts: Johnson, D Green 2		Pts: Shoutvin 20; Rebs: Shoutvin 8 Asts: Bet Yosef 3

Main Gymnasium of Universiade Center, Shenzhen
Referees: Jurgis Lauranovicius (Lithuania)

August 18, 2011
15:30

Report

Mexico	62–73	Finland
Scoring by quarter: 24–17, 16–23, 15–15, 7–18
Pts: Giron 19; Rebs: Nolasco Perez 9 Asts: Cruz 4		Pts: Kanervo 20; Rebs: Nuutinen 16; Asts: Nikkarinen 3

Gymnasium of the Senior High Division of Shenzhen Foreign Languages School, Shenzhen
Referees: Sergey Krug (Russia)

== Quarterfinal round ==
=== Classification 17th–23rd place ===
August 20, 2011
10:00

Report

New Zealand	56–90	Hungary
Scoring by quarter: 22–28, 6–16, 10–24, 18–22
Pts: Edwards 21; Rebs: Edwards 7 Asts: Prewster 3		Pts: P Kovacs 23; Rebs: Somogyi 7 Asts: four players 2

Main Gymnasium of Universiade Center, Shenzhen
Referees: Milija Vojinovic (Serbia)

August 20, 2011
10:00

South Korea	20–0	Philippines

Shenzhen Luohu Gymnasium, Shenzhen

August 20, 2011
12:30

Report

Hong Kong	73–86	UAE
Scoring by quarter: 18–23, 21–12, 19–34, 15–17
Pts: Lee Ki 25; Rebs: Tsoi 12; Asts: Chan 4		Pts: Alameri 26; Rebs: Al Zaabi 17; Asts: Ahmed, Al Zaabi 1

Gymnasium of Pingshan Sports Center, Shenzhen
Referees: Timothy Andrew Brown (New Zealand)

=== Classification 9th–16th place ===
August 20, 2011
12:30

Report

Czech Republic	78–69	Australia
Scoring by quarter: 22–15, 18–13, 13–11, 25–30
Pts: Dokoupil 18; Rebs: Auda 11; Asts: Moravec 5		Pts: Broekhoff 14; Rebs: Broekhoff 6 Asts: Maynard, Daly 3

Main Gymnasium of Universiade Center, Shenzhen
Referees: Zoltán Palla (Hungary)

August 20, 2011
12:30

Report

Turkey	92–84	Brazil
Scoring by quarter: 21–16, 16–19, 27–23, 28–26
Pts: Batuk 22; Rebs: Yildirim 11; Asts: Yildirim 5		Pts: Machado 30; Rebs: Silva 8 Asts: Machado 6

Shenzhen Luohu Gymnasium, Shenzhen
Referees: Sergey Krug (Russia)

August 20, 2011
18:00

Report

Ukraine	95–80	Israel
Scoring by quarter: 25–19, 27–21, 24–22, 19–18
Pts: Zaytsev 21; Rebs: Zaytsev 16; Asts: Burenko 8		Pts: Shoutvin 18; Rebs: Harush 8 Asts: Eytan, Harush 1

Gymnasium of Pingshan Sports Center, Shenzhen
Referees: Boris Schmidt (Germany)

August 20, 2011
20:30

Report

Mexico	88–92	Japan
Scoring by quarter: 25–29, 22–20, 23–17, 18–26
Pts: Giron 26; Rebs: Martin del Campo 9 Asts: Segura 3		Pts: Kanamaru 21; Rebs: Ono, Harimoto 5 Asts: Watanabe 4

Shenzhen Luohu Gymnasium, Shenzhen
Referees: Petri Mäntylä (Finland)

=== Quarterfinals ===
August 20, 2011
18:00

Report

United States	74–76	Lithuania
Scoring by quarter: 15–12, 27–25, 19–28, 13–11
Pts: Jenkins 17; Rebs: Mbakwe 10; Asts: Denmon, Jardine 3		Pts: Orelik 19; Rebs: Kadzevicius, Orelik 6 Asts: Stanionis 5

Main Gymnasium of Universiade Center, Shenzhen
Referees: Scott Paul Beker (Australia)

August 20, 2011
18:00

Report

Canada	71–58	Romania
Scoring by quarter: 25–14, 7–15, 22–15, 17–14
Pts: Hinz 23; Rebs: Hobin 7 Asts: Jones, Yu 4		Pts: Nicoară 20; Rebs: Nicoară 13; Asts: Popescu 4

Shenzhen Luohu Gymnasium, Shenzhen
Referees: Bradley Jon Giersch (Australia)

August 20, 2011
20:30

Report

Germany	55–77	Serbia
Scoring by quarter: 20–12, 13–23, 10–22, 12–20
Pts: Lischka 12; Rebs: Lischka 5 Asts: Doreth 4		Pts: Dragović 20; Rebs: Ljubičić 6 Asts: Drča 5

Main Gymnasium of Universiade Center, Shenzhen
Referees: Oscar Lefwerth (Sweden)

August 20, 2011
20:30

Report

Russia	74–39	Finland
Scoring by quarter: 19–9, 22–9, 18–9, 15–12
Pts: Nelyubov 17; Rebs: Nelyubov, Mateyunas 8 Asts: Zaitsev 5		Pts: Nikkarinen 16; Rebs: Nikkarinen, Nenonen 4 Asts: Nikkarinen, Vanttaja 1

Shenzhen Luohu Gymnasium, Shenzhen
Referees: Tomasz Kudlicki (Poland)

== Semifinal round ==
=== Classification 21st–23rd place ===
August 21, 2011
18:00

Hong Kong	20–0	Philippines

Gymnasium of the Senior High Division of Shenzhen Foreign Languages School, Shenzhen

=== Classification 17th–20th place ===
August 21, 2011
15:30

Report

UAE	61–87	South Korea
Scoring by quarter: 16–27, 22–20, 11–17, 12–23
Pts: Al Braiki 22; Rebs: Al Braiki 10; Asts: Alameri, Al Zaabi 3		Pts: Cha BW 30; Rebs: Choi BK 13; Asts: Kim JW 5

Shenzhen Luohu Gymnasium, Shenzhen
Referees: Robert Paulik (Czech Republic)

August 21, 2011
15:30

Report

China	79–72	Hungary
Scoring by quarter: 20–25, 15–11, 19–20, 25–16
Pts: Li 26; Rebs: Ren JF 11; Asts: Znang 6		Pts: Supola 19; Rebs: Morgen 10; Asts: Helmeczi 4

Gymnasium of Pingshan Sports Center, Shenzhen
Referees: Richard Ivan Stehlik (Canada)

=== Classification 13th–16th place ===
August 21, 2011
18:00

Report

Brazil	79–61	Mexico
Scoring by quarter: 17–15, 21–13, 25–13, 16–20
Pts: Machado 16; Rebs: Santos 11; Asts: Machado 4		Pts: Giron 17; Rebs: Giron 10; Asts: Cheda 2

Gymnasium of Pingshan Sports Center, Shenzhen
Referees: Mei Wang (China)

August 21, 2011
18:00

Report

Australia	83–88 (OT)	Israel
Scoring by quarter: 19–19, 13–17, 18–21, 22–15, Overtime: 11–16
Pts: Dowdell 23; Rebs: Dowdell 10; Asts: Maynard, Broekhoff, Dowdell 3		Pts: Bet Yosef 19; Rebs: Pitsnon 17; Asts: Pitsnon, Shoutvin 3

Gymnasium of the Senior High Division of Shenzhen Foreign Languages School, Shenzhen
Referees: Rafael Ganiev (Russia)

=== Classification 9th–12th place ===
August 21, 2011
18:00

Report

Czech Republic	52–71	Ukraine
Scoring by quarter: 11–15, 17–17, 12–14, 12–25
Pts: Auda 12; Rebs: Hruban 5 Asts: Dokoupil 2		Pts: Korniienko 20; Rebs: Burenko, Tymofeyenko 7 Asts: Shchepkin, Burenko 3

Shenzhen Luohu Gymnasium, Shenzhen
Referees: Bradley Jon Giersch (Australia)

August 21, 2011
20:30

Report

Turkey	85–83	Japan
Scoring by quarter: 24–21, 21–25, 21–19, 19–18
Pts: Batuk 17; Rebs: Paçun 9 Asts: Ozcan 5		Pts: Kanamaru 20; Rebs: Ono 13; Asts: Ono 7

Gymnasium of the Senior High Division of Shenzhen Foreign Languages School, Shenzhen
Referees: Richard Ivan Stehlik (Canada)

=== Classification 5th–8th place ===
August 21, 2011
20:30

Report

Romania	73–94	United States
Scoring by quarter: 12–20, 17–27, 26–27, 18–20
Pts: Nicoara 22; Rebs: Moldoveanu 11; Asts: Moldoveanu, Nicoara 3		Pts: D Green 16; Rebs: Abromaitis, J Green, Mbakwe 8 Asts: D Green 4

Shenzhen Luohu Gymnasium, Shenzhen
Referees: Mindaugas Vecerskis (Lithuania)

August 21, 2011
20:30

Report

Germany	84–63	Finland
Scoring by quarter: 27–14, 4–16, 28–15, 125–18
Pts: Schmidt 16; Rebs: Tadda 10; Asts: Tadda 6		Pts: Nuutinen 16; Rebs: Niemi 7 Asts: Ahonen, Kanervo 4

Gymnasium of Pingshan Sports Center, Shenzhen
Referees: Jacob Cassimiro Barreto (Brazil)

=== Semifinals ===
August 21, 2011
12:30

Report

Canada	83–68	Lithuania
Scoring by quarter: 24–18, 15–11, 17–18, 27–21
Pts: Hinz 21; Rebs: Lieffers 8 Asts: Yu 2		Pts: Zule 15; Rebs: Zule 8 Asts: Sapiega, Stanionis 3

Main Gymnasium of Universiade Center, Shenzhen
Referees: Zoltán Palla (Hungary)

August 21, 2011
15:30

Report

Serbia	81–61	Russia
Scoring by quarter: 23–18, 22–8, 19–19, 17–16
Pts: Lučić 18; Rebs: Birčević 7 Asts: Ljubičić 2		Pts: Zaitsev 15; Rebs: Nelyubov 8 Asts: Mateyunas 3

Main Gymnasium of Universiade Center, Shenzhen
Referees: Scott Paul Beker (Australia)

== Final round ==
=== 21st place game ===
August 22, 2011
10:00

Report

New Zealand	92–61	Hong Kong
Scoring by quarter: 27–18, 22–9, 24–15, 19–19
Pts: Alexander 25; Rebs: Clarke, Prewster 7 Asts: four players 1		Pts: Lee Ki 23; Rebs: Lee Ki, Wong 5 Asts: Lau 3

Shenzhen Luohu Gymnasium, Shenzhen
Referees: Boris Schmidt (Germany)

=== 19th place game ===
August 22, 2011
10:00

Report

Hungary	84–62	UAE
Scoring by quarter: 25–16, 16–15, 27–17, 16–14
Pts: Monacsi 20; Rebs: Kinter 9 Asts: P. Kovács 6		Pts: Alshabebi 21; Rebs: Alshabebi 9 Asts: Salem, Abdalla 2

Main Gymnasium of Universiade Center, Shenzhen
Referees: Robert Paulik (Czech Republic)

=== 17th place game ===
August 22, 2011
10:00

Report

China	87–88	South Korea
Scoring by quarter: 16–28, 25–16, 23–25, 23–19
Pts: Ren JF, Chang 20; Rebs: Ren JF 12; Asts: Zeng 4		Pts: Kim MG 17; Rebs: Kim MG 9 Asts: Kim MG 9

Gymnasium of Pingshan Sports Center, Shenzhen
Referees: Chris Dodds (Scotland)

=== 15th place game ===
August 22, 2011
12:30

Report

Australia	71–68	Mexico
Scoring by quarter: 14–19, 11–12, 17–15, 29–22
Pts: Steindl 15; Rebs: Maynard 8 Asts: Brandt 2		Pts: Cruz 15; Rebs: Cruz, Chávez 6 Asts: Segura, Delgado, Cruz 2

Shenzhen Luohu Gymnasium, Shenzhen
Referees: Yang Hong Feng (China)

=== 13th place game ===
August 22, 2011
12:30

Report

Israel	60–65	Brazil
Scoring by quarter: 15–17, 17–15, 16–9, 12–24
Pts: Reis, Karni 13; Rebs: Reis 8 Asts: Pitsnon, Shoutvin, Harush 1		Pts: Santos, Nogueira 13; Rebs: Santos 11; Asts: Chaia 3

Main Gymnasium of Universiade Center, Shenzhen
Referees: Rafael Ganiev (Russia)

=== 11th place game ===
August 22, 2011
12:30

Report

Czech Republic	94–81	Japan
Scoring by quarter: 28–29, 19–15, 21–14, 26–23
Pts: Auda 27; Rebs: Hruban 11; Asts: Hruban 4		Pts: Kanamaru 17; Rebs: Furukawa, Ono 7 Asts: five players 1

Gymnasium of Pingshan Sports Center, Shenzhen
Referees: Kaili Lyn Kimura (United States)

=== 9th place game ===
August 22, 2011
15:30

Report

Ukraine	76–71	Turkey
Scoring by quarter: 13–23, 14–13, 29–20, 20–15
Pts: Korniienko 22; Rebs: Korniienko 13; Asts: Burenko 9		Pts: Mahmutoğlu 16; Rebs: Paçun 9 Asts: Turna 7

Shenzhen Luohu Gymnasium, Shenzhen
Referees: Jacob Cassimiro Barreto (Brazil)

=== 7th place game ===
August 22, 2011
15:30

Report

Finland	76–69	Romania
Scoring by quarter: 23–20, 16–18, 16–17, 21–14
Pts: Kanervo 21; Rebs: Ojala, Nuutinen, Heinonen 6 Asts: Ahonen, Kanervo 3		Pts: Nicoara 18; Rebs: Moldoveanu 11; Asts: Nicoara 6

Gymnasium of Pingshan Sports Center, Shenzhen
Referees: Jurgis Lauranovicius (Lithuania)

=== 5th place game ===
August 22, 2011
18:00

Report

Germany	83–86	United States
Scoring by quarter: 21–19, 20–21, 20–24, 22–22
Pts: Lischka 28; Rebs: Seiferth 6 Asts: Doreth, Tadda, Lischka 3		Pts: Mbakwe 21; Rebs: Mbakwe 8 Asts: Gibbs, D Green 3

Shenzhen Luohu Gymnasium, Shenzhen
Referees: Marius Udrica (Romania)

=== Bronze medal game ===
August 22, 2011
19:00

Report

Russia	74–76	Lithuania
Scoring by quarter: 19–14, 16–10, 11–24, 28–28
Pts: Gubanov 24; Rebs: Kashirov 8 Asts: Golovin, Zaitsev 2		Pts: Ežerskis 25; Rebs: Kadzevicius 6 Asts: Peciukevicius 3

Main Gymnasium of Universiade Center, Shenzhen
Referees: Milija Vojinovic (Serbia)

=== Gold medal game ===
August 22, 2011
21:30

Report

Serbia	68–55	Canada
Scoring by quarter: 17–19, 15–15, 17–6, 19–15
Pts: Jeremić 17; Rebs: Birčević 8 Asts: Ljubičić 2		Pts: Yu, Hinz 14; Rebs: Hinz 7 Asts: Yu, Hinz 3

Main Gymnasium of Universiade Center, Shenzhen
Referees: Oscar Lefwerth (Sweden)

== Final standings ==
Place	Team	Score
1st place, gold medalist(s)	Serbia	6–1
2nd place, silver medalist(s)	Canada	5–2
3rd place, bronze medalist(s)	Lithuania	6–2
4	Russia	6–2
5	United States	7–1
6	Germany	6–2
7	Finland	4–4
8	Romania	3–5
9	Ukraine	6–2
10	Turkey	4–3
11	Czech Republic	5–3
12	Japan	3–5
13	Brazil	5–3
14	Israel	3–5
15	Australia	3–4
16	Mexico	3–5
17	South Korea	5–3
18	China	2–5
19	Hungary	2–6
20	UAE	1–7
21	New Zealand	2–5
22	Hong Kong	1–6
23	Philippines	0–7
