= Serbia at the 2011 Summer Universiade =

- IOC code: SRB
- NOC: Olympic Committee of Serbia
- Website: www.oks.org.rs

in Shenzhen
- Competitors: 31 in 3 sports
- Flag bearer: Vladimir Štimac
- Medals Ranked 26th: Gold 2 Silver 2 Bronze 0 Total 4

Summer Universiade appearances (overview)
- 2007; 2009; 2011; 2013; 2015; 2017; 2019; 2021; 2025; 2027

Serbia competed at the 2011 Summer Universiade in Shenzhen, China.

== Medalists ==
| Medal | Name | Sport | Event | Date |
|---|---|---|---|---|
| Gold | Basketball Men's team Mladen Jeremić; Marko Ljubičić; Stefan Živanović; Sava Lešić; Miloš Dimić; Stefan Birčević; Duško Bunić; Vladimir Lučić; Luka Drča; Nikola Cvetinović; Nikola Dragović; Vladimir Štimac | Basketball | Men's | 22 August |
| Gold | Water polo Men's team Branislav Mitrović; Luka Saponjić; Marko Matović; Srdjan Vuksanović; Miloš Miličić; Boris Vapenski; Strahinja Rašović; Nikola Dedović; Nemanja Ubović; Marko Petković; Petar Filipović; Aleksa Šaponjić; Stefan Živojinović | Waterpolo | Men's | 23 August |
| Silver | Damir Mikec | Shooting | 50 metre pistol | 18 August |
| Silver | Zorana Arunović | Shooting | 25 metre pistol | 21 August |

== Basketball ==
Serbia has qualified a men's team.

== Water polo ==
Serbia has qualified a men's team.

== Shooting ==
Serbia has qualified three men and three women.

Men

| Athlete | Event | Qualification | | Final | | Rank |
| Athlete | Event | Score | Rank | Score | Total | Rank |
|---|---|---|---|---|---|---|
| Damir Mikec | | | | | | 2nd place, silver medalist(s) |
| Dimitrije Grgić | | | | | | |
| Milenko Sebić | | | | | | |

Women

| Athlete | Event | Qualification | | Final | | Rank |
| Athlete | Event | Score | Rank | Score | Total | Rank |
|---|---|---|---|---|---|---|
| Zorana Arunović | | | | | | 2nd place, silver medalist(s) |
| Bobana Veličković | | | | | | |
| Andrea Arsović | | | | | | |
