= Carl Lindbom =

Carl Lindbom may refer to:

- Carl Lindbom (basketball) (born 1991), Finnish basketball player
- Carl Lindbom (ice hockey) (born 2003), Swedish ice hockey player
