= Chang Lin =

Chang Lin is the name of:

- Chang Lin (Three Kingdoms) (常林), an official in the state of Cao Wei during the Three Kingdoms period of China
- Chang Lin (basketball) (born 1989), a Chinese professional basketball player
- Chang Lin (footballer) (born 1981), a Chinese professional association footballer

== See also ==
- Zhang Lin (disambiguation) — "Zhang Lin" is the pinyin equivalent of "Chang Lin" in Wade–Giles
