= Zhang Lin =

Zhang Lin may refer to:

- Zhang Lin (dissident), (born 1963) a Chinese cyber-dissident from Anhui, China
- Zhang Lin (general), (born 1965), a Chinese lieutenant general
- Zhang Lin (rower) (born 1983), a Chinese rower
- Zhang Lin (swimmer) (born 1987), a Chinese swimmer from Beijing, China
- Zhang Lin (racewalker) (born 1993), a Chinese racewalker

== See also ==
- Chang Lin (disambiguation) — "Chang Lin" is the Wade–Giles equivalent of "Zhang Lin" in pinyin
