= Basketball at the 2011 Summer Universiade =

Basketball at the 2011 Summer Universiade was scheduled to be held from August 13 to August 22 in Shenzhen, China. In total, 40 teams will compete in the 2011 Summer Universiade (24 men's teams and 16 women's teams).

== Medal summary ==
=== Medal table ===
Rank	Nation	Gold	Silver	Bronze	Total
1	Serbia (SRB)	1	0	0	1
1	United States (USA)	1	0	0	1
3	Canada (CAN)	0	1	0	1
3	Chinese Taipei (TPE)	0	1	0	1
5	Australia (AUS)	0	0	1	1
5	Lithuania (LTU)	0	0	1	1
Totals (6 entries)		2	2	2	6

=== Events ===
Event	Gold	Silver	Bronze
Men	Serbia (SRB); Mladen Jeremić; Marko Ljubičić; Stefan Živanović; Sava Lešić; Miloš Dimić; Stefan Birčević; Duško Bunić; Vladimir Lučić; Luka Drča; Nikola Cvetinović; Nikola Dragović; Vladimir Štimac	Canada (CAN); Jahmal Jones; Nathan Yu; Kyle Desmarais; William Harrison; Jordan Baker; Michael Lieffers; Warren Ward; Cole Hobin; Tyson Hinz; Boris Bakovic; Lien Phillip; Owen Klassen	Lithuania (LTU); Mantas Kadzevičius; Matas Sapiega; Osvaldas Matulionis; Ernestas Ežerskis; Edgaras Stanionis; Darius Gvezdauskas; Augustas Pečiukevičius; Mindaugas Kupšas; Marius Valukonis; Gediminas Žylė; Julius Jucikas; Gediminas Orelik
Women	United States (USA); Odyssey Sims; Skylar Diggins; Natalie Novosel; Jacki Gemelos; Devereaux Peters; Shekinna Stricklen; Chiney Ogwumike; Keisha Hampton; Glory Johnson; Nneka Ogwumike; Elena Delle Donne; Lynetta Kizer	Chinese Taipei (TPE); Lo Chiaohui; Huang Fanshan; Yang Yahui; Lai Hsinyu; Huang Yingli; Chang Ning; Yang Shuching; Chen Yuchun; Hsu Chienhui; Wu Shinying; Huang Pingjen; Hsieh Peichun	Australia (AUS); Sarah Graham; Stephanie Cumming; Abby Bishop; Mia Newley; Emma Langford; Tess Madgen; Nicole Hunt; Louella Tomlinson; Katie-Rae Ebzery; Elyse Penaluna; Marianna Tolo; Cayla Francis

== Men ==
=== Teams ===
Americas	Asia	Europe	Oceania	Host nation
Brazil; Canada; Mexico; USA	Hong Kong; Japan; Philippines; South Korea; UAE	Czech Republic; Finland; Germany; Hungary; Israel; Lithuania; Romania; Russia; Serbia; Turkey; Ukraine	Australia; New Zealand	China

== Women ==
=== Teams ===
Americas	Asia	Europe	Oceania
Brazil; Canada; USA	China; Chinese Taipei; Japan	Czech Republic; Finland; Great Britain; Lithuania; Poland; Russia; Slovakia; Sweden	Australia
