= Josh Bloxham =

New Zealand basketball player

Personal information
- Born: 13 March 1990 (age 35); Christchurch, New Zealand
- Listed height: 186 cm (6 ft 1 in)

Career information
- High school: Marlborough Boys' College (Blenheim, New Zealand); Nelson College (Nelson, New Zealand)
- Playing career: 2006–present
- Position: Point guard

Career history
- 2006–2014: Nelson Giants
- 2010–2013: New Zealand Breakers
- 2015–2016: Super City Rangers
- 2020: Nelson Giants
- 2022: Joondalup Wolves

Career highlights
- 3× NBL champion (2011–2013); NZNBL champion (2007)

Joshua Kane Bloxham (born 13 March 1990) is a New Zealand basketball player. He played 12 seasons in the New Zealand NBL between 2006 and 2020, and was a member of the New Zealand Breakers of the Australian NBL between 2010 and 2013, where he won three NBL championships.

== Early life ==
Bloxham was born in Christchurch, New Zealand. He attended Marlborough Boys' College in Blenheim and Nelson College in Nelson.

== Playing career ==
=== New Zealand NBL ===
Bloxham joined the Nelson Giants of the New Zealand NBL as a 15-year-old. He played nine seasons for the Giants between 2006 and 2014. He was a member of the Giants in 2007 when they won the NZNBL championship.

Bloxham joined the Super City Rangers for the 2015 season. He re-joined the Rangers for the 2016 season.

In June 2020, Bloxham was acquired by the Nelson Giants for the 2020 season.

=== Australian NBL ===
Between 2010 and 2013, Bloxham was a development player with the New Zealand Breakers of the Australian NBL. In his three seasons, he won three straight NBL championships and played in 27 games.

=== NBL1 West ===
In February 2022, Bloxham signed with the Joondalup Wolves for the 2022 NBL1 West season.

=== National team ===
In 2005, Bloxham played for a New Zealand under 16 team in Australia.

In July 2009, Bloxham played for New Zealand at the FIBA Under-19 World Championship in Auckland.

In August 2011, Bloxham travelled to China for the Summer Universiade to compete with the New Zealand University National Team in the basketball tournament.

In July 2012, Bloxham played for New Zealand at the FIBA World Olympic Qualifying Tournament in Venezuela.

== Personal life ==
In 2013, Bloxham began pursuing a commerce degree in accounting through the Massey University campus in Auckland.
