= Petri Heinonen =

Finnish basketball player (born 1988)

No. 21 – Tampereen Pyrintö
- Position: Center / power forward
- League: Korisliiga

Personal information
- Born: 12 September 1988 (age 38) Tampere, Finland
- Listed height: 6 ft 10 in (2.08 m)
- Listed weight: 220 lb (100 kg)

Career information
- Playing career: 2005–present

Career history
- 2005–2007: Tampereen Pyrintö
- 2007–2009: Espoon Honka
- 2008–2013: Korihait
- 2013–present: Tampereen Pyrintö

Petri Juhani Heinonen (born 12 September 1988) is a Finnish basketball player. The 207 cm-tall (6 ft 9 in) center/forward Heinonen plays for Tampereen Pyrintö in Korisliiga. Alongside Finnish competitions, Heinonen has represented Pyrintö in Baltic Basketball League.

Heinonen won Finnish championship with Espoon Honka in 2008 and with Pyrintö in 2014. He was elected Korisliiga's Rookie of the Year in 2007 and Korisliiga's Most Developed Player of the Year in 2011. He has also played in Finland's national team. At 2011 Summer Universiade Heinonen played for seventh-positioned Finland. At the same year Heinonen belonged to Finland's squad that won its first Nordic championship for 28 years.

== Trophies and awards ==
- Korisliiga's Rookie of the Year in 2007
- Korisliiga's Most Developed Player of the Year in 2011.
- Finnish championship 2008 and 2014
- Baltic League: fourth in 2014

=== National team ===
- Nordic championship in 2011
- Summer Universiades: seventh in 2011
