= Peter Maynard =

Australian rules footballer

Personal information
- Full name: Peter Maynard
- Born: 28 June 1960 (age 66); Shepparton, Victoria
- Original team: Shepparton (GVFL)
- Height: 175 cm (5 ft 9 in)
- Weight: 76 kg (168 lb)

Playing career^{1}
Years	Club	Games (Goals)
1980–1981	Melbourne	8 (1)
1982–1990	Glenelg	196 (162)
1991	Woodville-West Torrens	21 (22)
Total		225 (185)
- ^{1} Playing statistics correct to the end of 1991.

Peter Maynard (born 28 June 1960) is a former Australian rules footballer who played with Melbourne in the Victorian Football League (VFL) and Glenelg and Woodville-West Torrens in the South Australian National Football League (SANFL).

He is best known for his time with Glenelg in the SANFL who he played for from 1982 to 1990. Maynard was a member of Glenelg's drought-breaking premiership win in 1985 and also a part of the team that went back-to-back for Glenelg in 1986.

Maynard then spent one season in 1991 with the Woodville-West Torrens Eagles. He later became the team runner for the Adelaide Football Club. He is the father of current Collingwood player Brayden Maynard and former Demons player Corey Maynard.
