= Marco Alexander =

New Zealand basketball player (born 1991)

Personal information
- Born: 14 August 1991 (age 35) Skopje, North Macedonia
- Listed height: 185 cm (6 ft 1 in)
- Listed weight: 80 kg (176 lb)

Career information
- High school: Rangitoto College (Auckland, New Zealand)
- Playing career: 2011–2016
- Position: Shooting guard / point guard

Career history
- 2011: Waikato Pistons
- 2012: Harbour Heat
- 2013: Waikato Pistons
- 2014–2015: Hawke's Bay Hawks
- 2014–2015: Melbourne United
- 2016: Super City Rangers

Marco Alexander (born 14 August 1991) is a New Zealand former basketball player who played six seasons in the National Basketball League (NBL).

== Early life and junior career ==
Alexander was born in Skopje, North Macedonia, to Macedonian parents, Victor and Stefi. He began playing basketball at age 7 and continued to play upon arriving in New Zealand at age 12. His parents left for New Zealand during the 2001 war in the former Yugoslavia, with Alexander and his younger brother Borjan arriving two years later. Growing up in Auckland, Alexander played basketball, soccer, volleyball, water polo and athletics.

Alexander attended Rangitoto College between 2005 and 2009 and played for the school's basketball team. He graduated as the school's all-time scoring leader. While at high school, he played for North Harbour Basketball Association throughout the age groups and won four national titles and was named to three all-tournament teams. He also made the New Zealand under 18 team and the New Zealand Breakers academy squad.

In 2009 at the Under 19 National Championships, Alexander helped Harbour finish in third place. In 2010 at the Under 21 National Championships, he led Harbour to the title while earning Tournament MVP honours. At the Under 21 National Championships in 2011, he helped Waikato finish in third place while earning all-tournament team honours. In 2013 at the Under 23 National Championships, he led North Harbour to the title while earning all-tournament team honours.

Alexander also played in the CBL Zone 1 competition, suiting up for the Breakers Academy in 2009, Northside in 2010, and the Harbour Heat Reserves in 2012.

== NBL career ==
Alexander made his debut in the New Zealand NBL in 2011 for the Waikato Pistons. He went on to play for the Harbour Heat in 2012, before returning to the Pistons in 2013. In 2014, he played the Hawke's Bay Hawks.

Following his first season with the Hawks, Alexander had a trial with the New Zealand Breakers in the lead up to the 2014–15 Australian NBL season. After missing out on a roster spot, he moved to Australia and joined Melbourne United as a development player. He suited up for Melbourne in three games between 12 October and 2 November, making his first and only appearance on the court in the Australian NBL on 19 October against the Breakers. In December 2014, he underwent season-ending hip surgery on both hips.

Alexander re-joined the Hawks in 2015, before playing his final season in the New Zealand NBL in 2016 with the Super City Rangers. In 81 career games in the New Zealand NBL, Alexander averaged 8.0 points, 1.9 rebounds, 1.4 assists and 1.0 steals per game.

== National team ==
In August 2011, Alexander travelled to China for the Summer Universiade to compete with the New Zealand University National Team in the basketball tournament. In seven games, he averaged 15.0 points, 3.6 rebounds and 2.1 steals per game.

In July 2013, Alexander was named in a Tall Blacks trial squad in the lead up to their China tour.

In June 2017, Alexander travelled to France with the New Zealand 3x3 National Team to compete in the FIBA 3x3 World Cup.
