= Shlomi Harush =

Israeli basketball player

Shlomi Harush שלומי הרוש
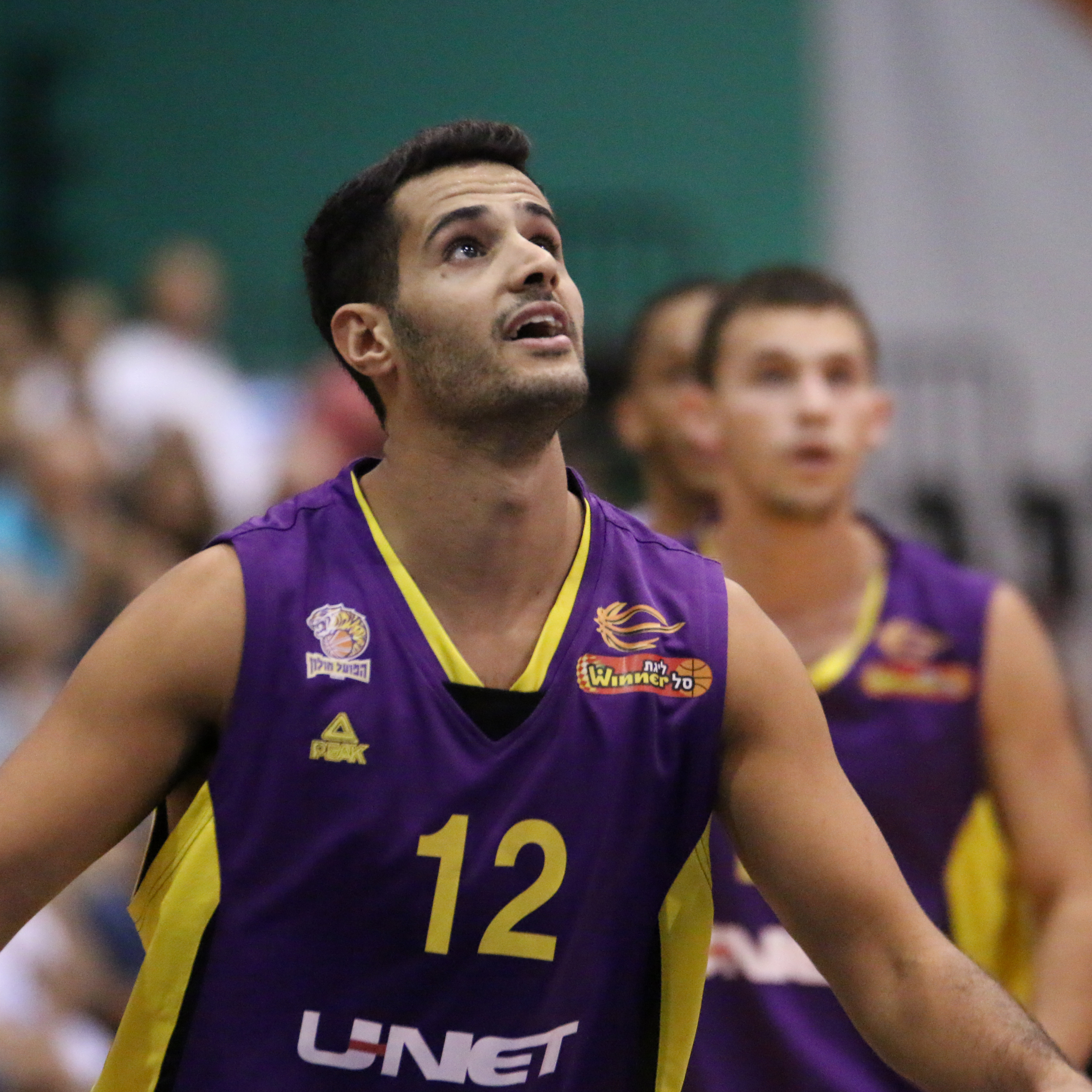
- Harush playing for Holon, 2016

No. 12 – H.kfar Qasem
- Position: Shooting guard
- League: Israeli Premier League; FIBA Champions League

Personal information
- Born: November 3, 1987 (age 39) Kfar Saba, Israel
- Listed height: 1.85 m (6 ft 1 in)
- Listed weight: 77 kg (170 lb)

Career information
- Playing career: 2006–present

Career history
- 2006–2011: Hapoel Kfar Saba/Kohav Yair
- 2011–2015: Hapoel Holon
- 2015–2016: Hapoel Eilat
- 2016–present: Hapoel Holon

Career highlights
- Israeli Cup winner (2018); 3× Israeli League All-Star (2013, 2015, 2017)

Shlomi Harush (Hebrew: שלומי הרוש; born November 3, 1987) is an Israeli professional basketball player for Hapoel Holon of the Israeli Premier League.

== Early years ==
Harush was born in Kfar Saba, Israel. He played for the Hapoel Kfar Saba youth team.

== Professional career ==
On July 26, 2011, Harush signed a three-year deal with Hapoel Holon. On his first month with the club, Harush won the Young Player of the Month award for his performance on October '11.

On July 22, 2015, Harush signed with Hapoel Eilat for the 2015–2016. However, In January 2016, Harush parted ways with Eilat and returned to Hapoel Holon for the remainder of the season.

On July 13, 2016, Harush signed a three-year contract extension with Hapoel Holon. During the 2016–17 season, he was selected to the Israeli League All-Star game.

== Israeli national team ==
Harush was a member of the Israeli Under-21 national team at the 2011 Summer Universiade.
