= Corey Maynard =

Australian rules footballer and basketball player

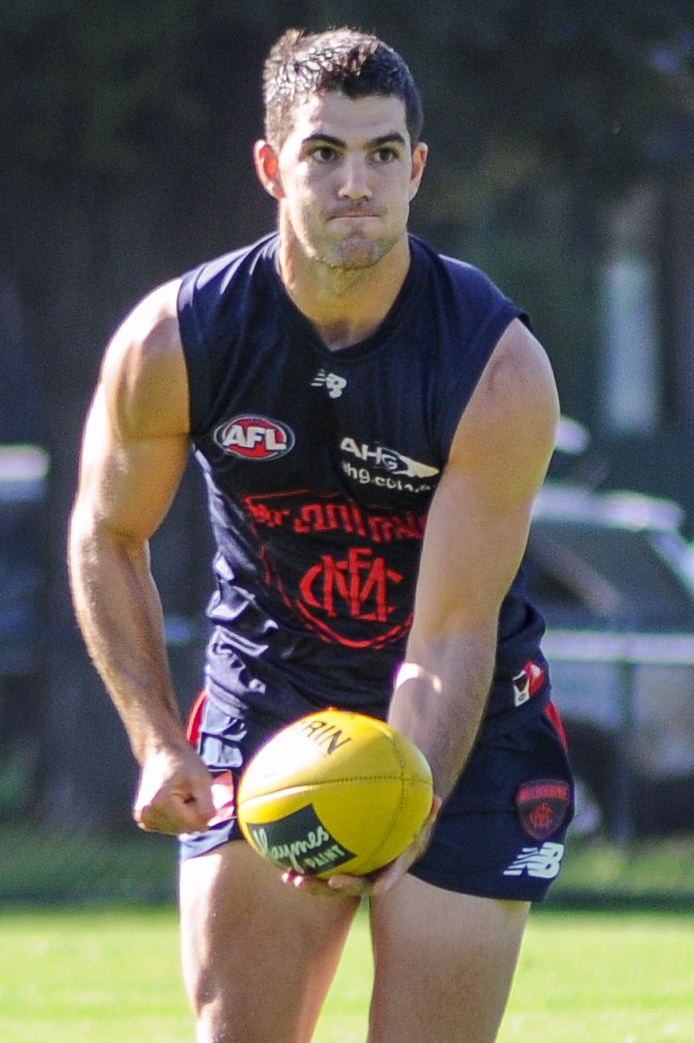
- Maynard training with Melbourne in March 2017
- Born: 7 October 1991 (age 35); Adelaide, South Australia, Australia
Australian rules football career
Personal information
- Height: 185 cm (6 ft 1 in)
- Weight: 89 kg (196 lb)
Club information
- Current club: Melbourne
- Number: 20
Playing career^{1}
| Years | Club | Games (Goals) |
| 2017–2019 | Melbourne | 2 (1) |
- ^{1} Playing statistics correct to the end of 2019.
Basketball career

Career information
- High school: Sacred Heart College (Adelaide, South Australia)
- College: Bryant (2010–2014)
- NBA draft: 2014: undrafted
- Playing career: 2009–2016
- Position: Point guard / shooting guard

Career history
- 2009–2010: Sturt Sabres
- 2014: McKinnon Cougars
- 2014–2015: Cairns Taipans
- 2015: Cairns Marlins
- 2015–2016: Townsville Crocodiles
- 2016: Bisons Loimaa
- 2016: Frankston Blues

Career highlights
- Third-team All-NEC (2014); Central ABL champion (2010)

Corey James Maynard (born 7 October 1991) is an Australian former professional sportsman who played basketball and Australian rules football. He played college basketball for Bryant University before playing professionally in the National Basketball League (NBL) for the Cairns Taipans and Townsville Crocodiles. He switched to football in 2016 to play in the Australian Football League (AFL) for the Melbourne Football Club. He retired in 2019.

== Early life ==
Born in Adelaide, South Australia, Maynard moved with his family to Melbourne when he was seven. He started playing representative basketball for McKinnon Basketball Association from under 12s, leading numerous Cougar teams in the Victorian Championship (VC) division within the Victorian Junior Basketball League (VJBL) up until under 18s. He was also a loyal eight-year player of the Moorabbin Magic.

After moving back to Adelaide as a 15-year-old, Maynard enrolled at Sacred Heart College and represented South Australia Metro in the Under 20 National Championships, where he led the team to the gold medal game against Vic Metro. In 2009 and 2010, he played for the Sturt Sabres, winning team MVP honours in 2009 and a Central ABL championship in 2010.

In Year 12 at Sacred Heart College, Maynard averaged 26 points per game en route to being named MVP of the 2010 Marist National Championships.

== Basketball career ==
=== College ===
As a freshman at Bryant in 2010–11, Maynard was a staple in the Bulldogs' lineup, appearing in 30 games and averaging 4.7 points, 2.5 rebounds and 2.5 assists in 22.4 minutes per game.

As a sophomore in 2011–12, Maynard vastly improved, but his development was disrupted due to an injury which forced him to miss 11 games, including the final six of the regular season. In 19 games (18 starts), he averaged 11.4 points, 4.8 rebounds, 3.5 assists and 1.1 steals in 34.5 minutes per game.

As a junior in 2012–13, Maynard solidified himself as a mainstay in the Bulldog starting lineup. On March 2, 2013, he made his 100th career three-pointer against Saint Francis. In 30 games (28 starts), he averaged 9.3 points, 5.2 rebounds, 3.5 assists and 1.1 steals in 33.0 minutes per game.

On 18 January 2014, Maynard scored a career-high 30 points in a 95–68 win against Fairleigh Dickinson. As a senior in 2013–14, Maynard earned third-team All-NEC honours. In 31 games, he averaged 13.3 points, 4.9 rebounds, 4.3 assists and 1.3 steals in 35.2 minutes per game.

=== Professional ===
==== 2014–15 season ====
On 29 April 2014, Maynard signed with the Cairns Taipans for the 2014–15 NBL season. On 16 May 2014, he signed with the McKinnon Cougars of the Big V. He appeared in six games for the Cougars in 2014, averaging 18.3 points, 5.2 rebounds, 3.2 assists and 2.0 steals per game.

After injuring his left thumb on 3 January 2015 against the Townsville Crocodiles, Maynard was ruled out for an extended period of time. Upon his return to health, however, prior to the Taipans' semi-final match-up against the Perth Wildcats, Maynard lost his spot in the line-up to 11th man Nathan Sobey. In 19 games for the Taipans, he averaged 1.1 points and 1.2 rebounds per game. In late April, he joined the Cairns Marlins for the 2015 Queensland Basketball League season.

==== 2015–16 season ====
On 27 July 2015, Maynard signed with the Townsville Crocodiles for the 2015–16 NBL season. On 4 January 2016, he was ruled out for two to three weeks with an ankle injury. He missed two games with the injury, returning to action on 21 January against the New Zealand Breakers. In 2015–16, Maynard proved himself capable of running the offence, setting up his teammates, getting to the rim himself, hitting the outside shot, and playing strong defence. In 25 games for the Crocodiles, he averaged 6.3 points, 2.8 rebounds and 1.7 assists per game.

On 29 February 2016, Maynard signed with Bisons Loimaa of the Finnish Korisliiga. He managed just two games for the team before the club parted ways with him in mid-March.

On 20 April 2016, Maynard signed with the Frankston Blues for the rest of the 2016 SEABL season. In 14 games for the Blues, he averaged 12.4 points, 4.6 rebounds and 2.8 assists per game.

=== National team ===
In August 2011, Maynard represented Australia at the 2011 Summer Universiade in China.

== AFL career ==
On 17 August 2016, Maynard signed with the Melbourne Football Club in the Australian Football League (AFL) as a category B rookie. His previous football experience was as a 16-year-old. On 5 August 2017, Maynard made his AFL debut in Melbourne's 97–62 loss to the Greater Western Sydney Giants in Canberra. He had 18 disposals and kicked a goal against the Giants, with coach Simon Goodwin saying Maynard did everything that could've been expected from him in his first AFL game.

Maynard's 2018 season was limited due to injury, with hip surgery in June ending his season.

On 26 October 2018, Maynard was promoted to Melbourne's senior list. However, he did not make the senior team in 2019, playing out the year with the Casey Demons in the VFL. In August 2019, he announced his retirement from the AFL after a tough run with injury.

== Personal life ==
Maynard is the son of Peter and Donna Maynard, and has one brother, Brayden, and one sister, Karli. His father, Peter, played eight games for Melbourne between 1980 and 1981 before playing 216 games in the SANFL with Glenelg and Woodville West-Torrens. His grandfather, Graham Campbell, played 151 games for Fitzroy and won the club's 1957 best and fairest award. His brother, Brayden, currently plays in the AFL for Collingwood.
