= Ryumo Ono =

Japanese basketball player

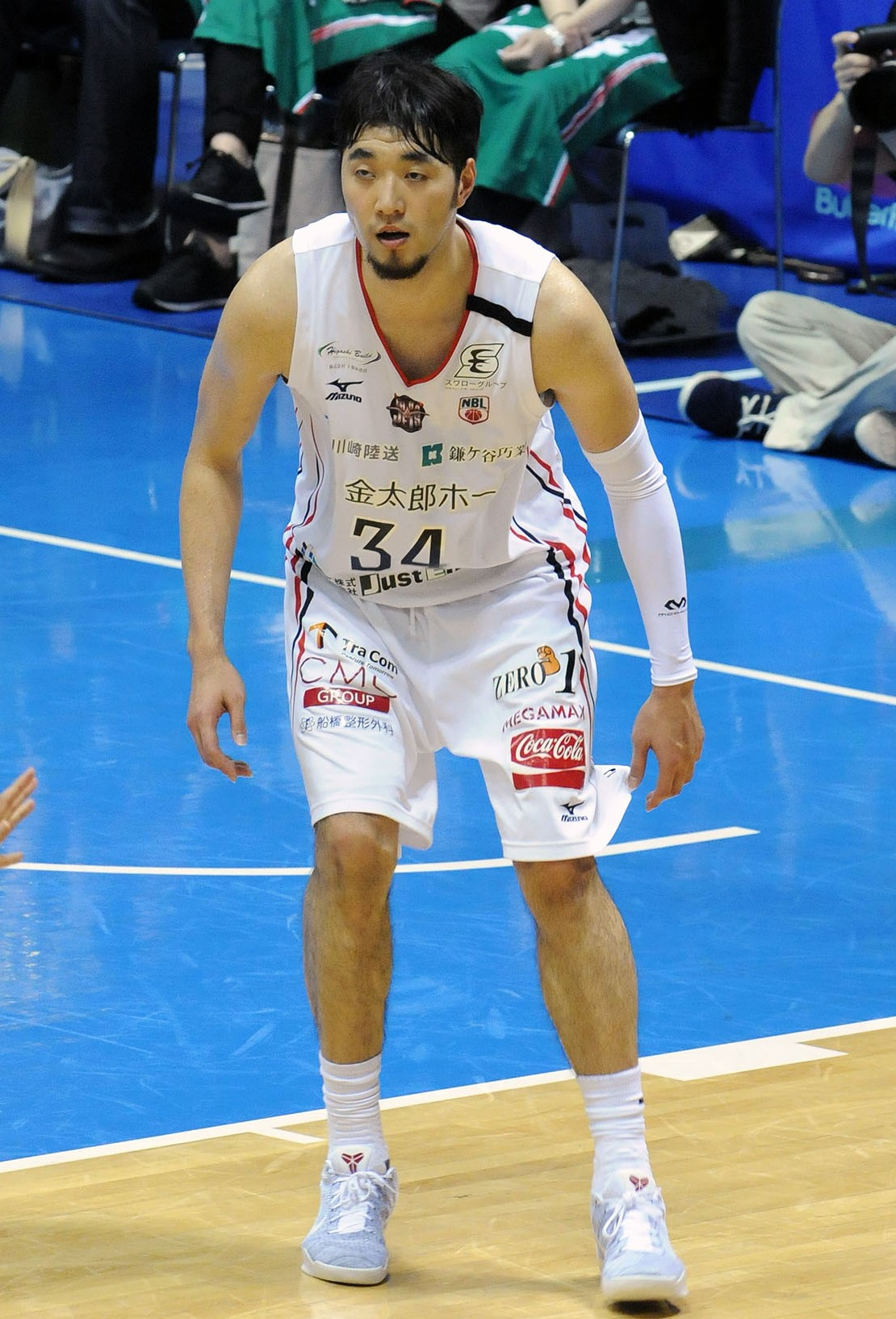

No. 0 – Kyoto Hannaryz
- Position: Small forward
- League: B.League

Personal information
- Born: January 6, 1988 (age 38) Tokyo, Japan
- Listed height: 1.98 m (6 ft 6 in)

Career information
- High school: Kokugakuin University Kugayama High
- College: Chuo University
- Playing career: 2010–present

Career history
- 2010–2013: Toyota Alvark
- 2013–2020: Chiba Jets
- 2020–2022: Shinshu Brave Warriors
- 2022–2025: Toyama Grouses
- 2025–present: Kyoto Hannaryz
Medals
Men's basketball
Representing Japan
Asian Games
Bronze medal – third place	2014 South Korea	Team competition

Ryumo Ono (Japanese: 小野 龍猛, Hepburn: Ono Ryūmo; born 6 January 1988) is a Japanese professional basketball player for the Kyoto Hannaryz club of the Japanese B.League. He represented Japan's national basketball team at the 2015 FIBA Asia Championship in Changsha, China, where he was the team's best 3-point shooter.

== Career statistics ==
Legend
GP	Games played	GS	Games started	MPG	Minutes per game
FG%	Field goal percentage	3P%	3-point field goal percentage	FT%	Free throw percentage
RPG	Rebounds per game	APG	Assists per game	SPG	Steals per game
BPG	Blocks per game	PPG	Points per game	**Bold**	Career high

Year	Team	GP	GS	MPG	FG%	3P%	FT%	RPG	APG	SPG	BPG	PPG
2013-14	Chiba	39	37	33.2	.370	.341	.616	5.1	1.8	0.8	0.2	14.3
2014-15	Chiba	46	43	30.8	.371	.332	.750	3.8	1.8	1.0	0.3	12.2
2015-16	Chiba	55	55	28.6	.343	.284	.676	4.1	1.8	0.7	0.3	8.6
2016-17	Chiba	60	60	31.2	.411	.398	.670	3.1	2.4	0.6	0.2	12.3
2017-18	Chiba	59	59	27.1	.402	.365	.656	3.0	3.3	0.6	0.3	11.3
