= Antti Kanervo =

Finnish basketball player (born 1989)

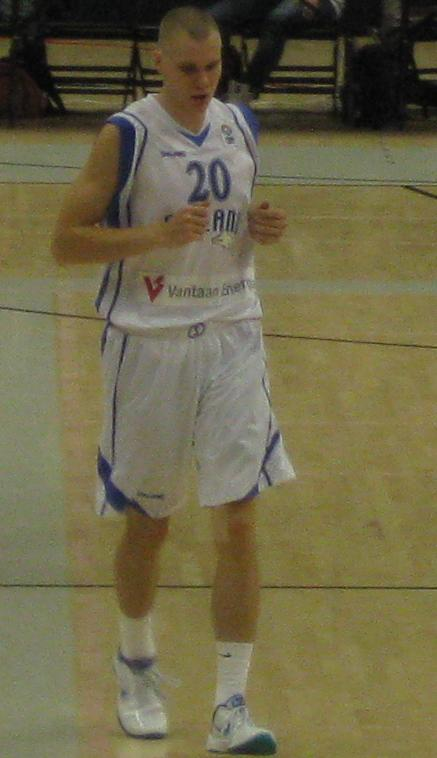

No. 18 – BC Nokia
- Position: Shooting guard
- League: Korisliiga

Personal information
- Born: April 12, 1989 (age 36) Äänekoski, Finland
- Listed height: 1.93 m (6 ft 4 in)
- Listed weight: 86 kg (190 lb)

Career information
- Playing career: 2005–present

Career history
- 2005–2007: Äänekosken Huima
- 2007–2008: BC Jyväskylä
- 2008–2010: Kouvot
- 2010–2014: Joensuun Kataja
- 2014–2016: Kauhajoen Karhu
- 2016–2017: Chorale Roanne Basket
- 2017–2018: Helsinki Seagulls
- 2018–2019: Stjarnan
- 2019–2023: Helsinki Seagulls
- 2023–2024: Stjarnan
- 2024–present: BC Nokia

Career highlights
- Finnish champion (2023); 5× Finnish Cup winner (2010, 2011, 2020–2022); Icelandic Cup winner (2019); Finnish D1 MVP (2008)

Antti Kanervo (born 12 April 1989) is a Finnish professional basketball player for the BC Nokia of the Finnish Korisliiga.

== Playing career ==
=== Professional career ===
Kanervo started his career at Huima in Äänekoski. He moved to BC Jyväskylä in spring 2007 and hit himself in the following season. In the last match of the season, he scored 64 points and earned 21.1 points throughout the season. For the 2008–2009 season, Kanervo signed a two-year contract with Kouvot in the Finnish top-tier Korisliiga. He played two season for the club and won the bronze medal in 2010. Kanervo moved with coach Jukka Toijala after Joensuu's junior season 2009–2010.

In June 2016, Kanervo signed with Chorale Roanne Basket of the LNB Pro B.

In August 2018, Kanervo signed with Stjarnan of the Icelandic Úrvalsdeild karla. On 13 December 2018, he scored a season high 40 points in Stjarnan victory against UMF Grindavík. On 16 February 2019, he helped Stjarnan win the Icelandic Cup, scoring 11 points in the team's 84–68 victory against Njarðvík in the Cup finals. During the regular season, Kanervo averaged 17.5 points per game, helping Stjarnan post the best record in the league and a home court advantage through the playoffs.

On 29 March 2019, Kanervo was hit by coins thrown by a fan in Grindavík in the closing seconds of Stjarnan's playoffs victory against UMF Grindavík.

He helped Stjarnan reach the semi-finals in the playoffs where they unexpectedly lost to 7th seeded ÍR. In 9 playoffs games, Kanervo averaged 15.7 points per game while making 39 percent of his three-point shots.

On 22 July 2019, Kanervo returned to Finland signing with Helsinki Seagulls for the 2019–20 season. In 2023, he helped the Seagulls win the Finnish Championship.

In July 2023, Kanervo returned to Iceland and signed back with Stjarnan. He averaged 15.6 points, 2.5 rebounds, 2.3 assists and shot 43.5% from the field

=== National team career ===
Kanervo debuted with the Finnish national basketball team in 2010.

== Awards, titles and achievements ==
=== Titles ===
- Icelandic Cup:
  - 2019
- Finnish Cup (2):
  - 2011, 2012

=== Awards ===
- Finnish D1 MVP:
  - 2008
