= Zhang Lin (dissident) =

Zhang Lin (born 1963 in Bengbu, Anhui) is a cyber-dissident from the People's Republic of China. He led student hunger strikes in Bengbu in 1989. He was imprisoned on 29 January 2005, in Bengbu's No. 1 Detention Center. August 2009, Lin was released free. However, he has constantly been harassed by Chinese government after that. He was imprisoned again on September 5, 2014, and was released in September 2016. Zhang moved to the US in 2018 and he is running his YouTube channel.

Zhang Lin's daughter Zhang Anni was arrested at her primary school on 27 February 2013 and detained with her father Zhang Lin for three hours. On 7 September 2013, Zhang Anni and her elder sister departed China from Shanghai Pudong International Airport with help from Consulate General of the United States, Shanghai, and resettled in San Francisco, United States.
