= Birkan Batuk =

Turkish basketball player (born 1990)

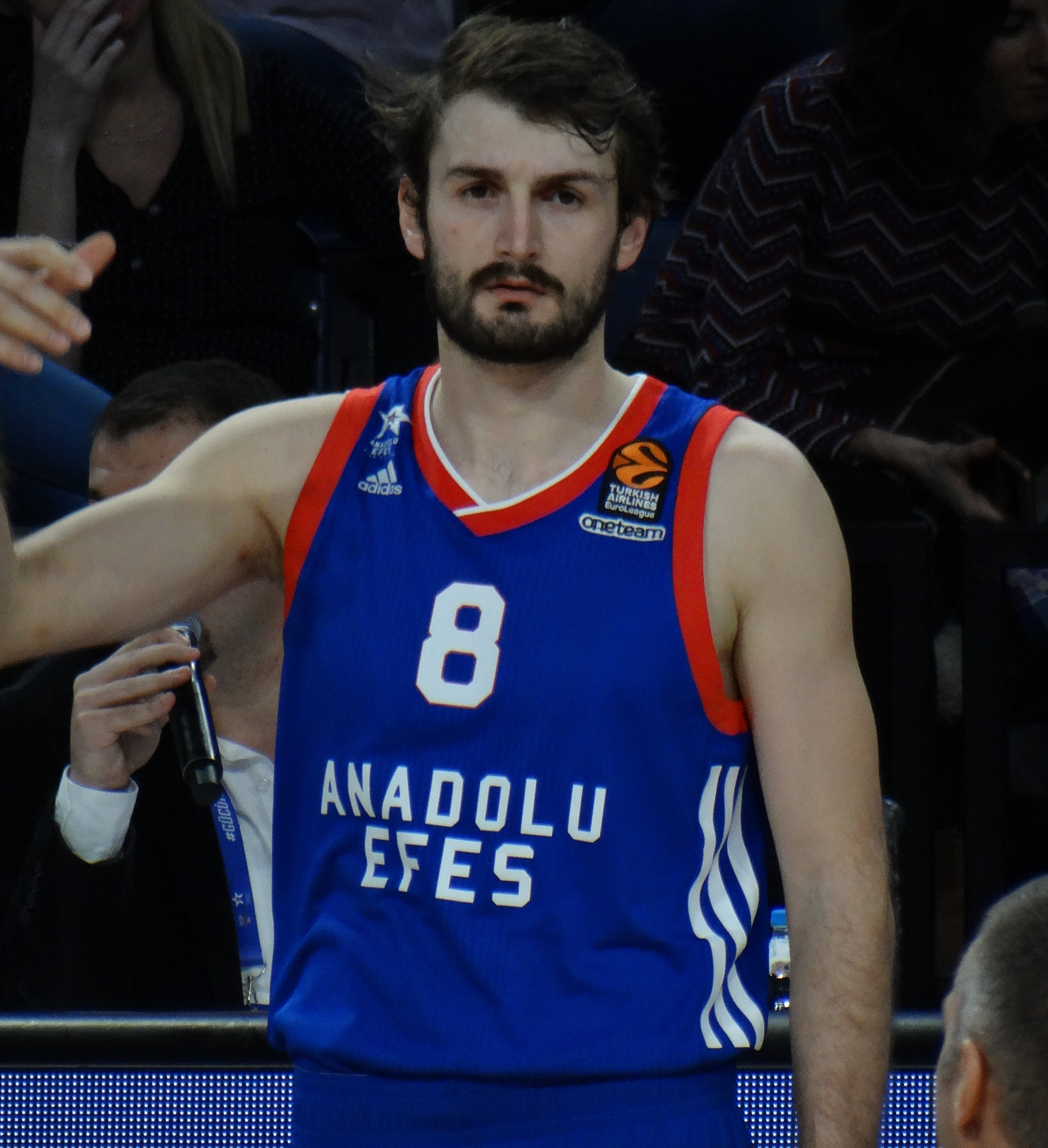
- Batuk with Anadolu Efes in 2017.

Personal information
- Born: January 30, 1990 (age 36) Istanbul, Turkey
- Listed height: 6 ft 5 in (1.96 m)
- Listed weight: 191 lb (87 kg)

Career information
- NBA draft: 2012: undrafted
- Playing career: 2006–2025
- Position: Shooting guard / small forward
- Number: 8, 12

Career history
- 2006–2008: Alpella
- 2008–2009: Trabzonspor
- 2009–2012: Pınar Karşıyaka
- 2012–2016: Anadolu Efes
- 2016-2017: Darüşşafaka Doğuş
- 2017–2019: Anadolu Efes
- 2019: → Pınar Karşıyaka (loan)
- 2019–2020: Beşiktaş Sompo Japan
- 2020–2022: Bursaspor
- 2022–2023: Gaziantep Basketbol
- 2024: Harem Spor

Career highlights
- 2× Turkish Cup (2015, 2018); Turkish Presidential Cup (2015); BSL All-Star Game MVP (2011)
Medals
Men's basketball
Representing Turkey
Mediterranean Games
Gold medal – first place	2013 Mersin	Team

Birkan Batuk (born January 30, 1990) is a former Turkish professional basketball player. He mainly played at the shooting guard position, but he also has the ability to play as a small forward, if needed.

== Professional career ==
=== Early years ===
Batuk started to play basketball with Pamukspor. He moved to Ülkerspor junior team after his outstanding success with Pamukspor. He signed a professional contract with Alpella after playing for Ülkerspor junior team. He made his professional debut in the Turkish Basketball Super League with Alpella during the 2006-07 season. He signed a contract with Trabzonspor for 1 year in the TB2L after playing with Alpella.

=== Pınar Karşıyaka (2009–2012) ===
In the summer of 2009, he signed a contract with Pınar Karşıyaka. In June 2011, he signed an extension contract with Pınar Karşıyaka until 2013.

On February 9, 2011, he participated in the BSL All Star game. He led his team to victory, scoring 26 points, grabbing 6 rebounds and 4 assists. So, he was named MVP of the BSL All Star game.

On May 7, 2011, Batuk also scored a career-high 31 points in 25 minutes (on 7/8 3 pointers) in a victory against Trabzonspor.

=== Anadolu Efes (2012–2016) ===
In the summer of 2012, Batuk was transferred to Anadolu Efes where he signed a two-year deal. In May 2014, he re-signed his contract with Anadolu Efes. In August 2014, he suffered an Achilles tendon injury during a pre-season game. He was expected to be 5–6 months off the court.

=== Darüşşafaka Doğuş (2016–2017) ===
On June 20, 2016, he signed a two-year contract with Darüşşafaka Doğuş.

=== Anadolu Efes (2017–2019) ===
At the beginning of the 2017-18 season he re-signed with Anadolu Efes.

==== Loan to Pınar Karşıyaka (2019) ====
On 3 January 2019, it was announced that Birkan was loaned to Pınar Karşıyaka for the rest of the season.

=== Beşiktaş Sompo Japan (2019–2020) ===
On August 10, 2019, Birkan signed with Beşiktaş Sompo Japan of the Turkish Basketball Super League (BSL).

=== Bursaspor (2020–2022) ===
On July 15, 2020, he has signed with Bursaspor of the Turkish Basketball Super League (BSL).

=== Gaziantep Basketbol (2022–2023) ===
On June 26, 2022, he has signed with Gaziantep Basketbol of the Basketbol Süper Ligi (BSL).

=== Retirement ===
On April 27, 2025, he announced his retirement from professional basketball.

== Turkish national team ==
Batuk was also a regular Turkey youth national team player.
