= Bora Paçun =

Turkish basketball player (born 1987)

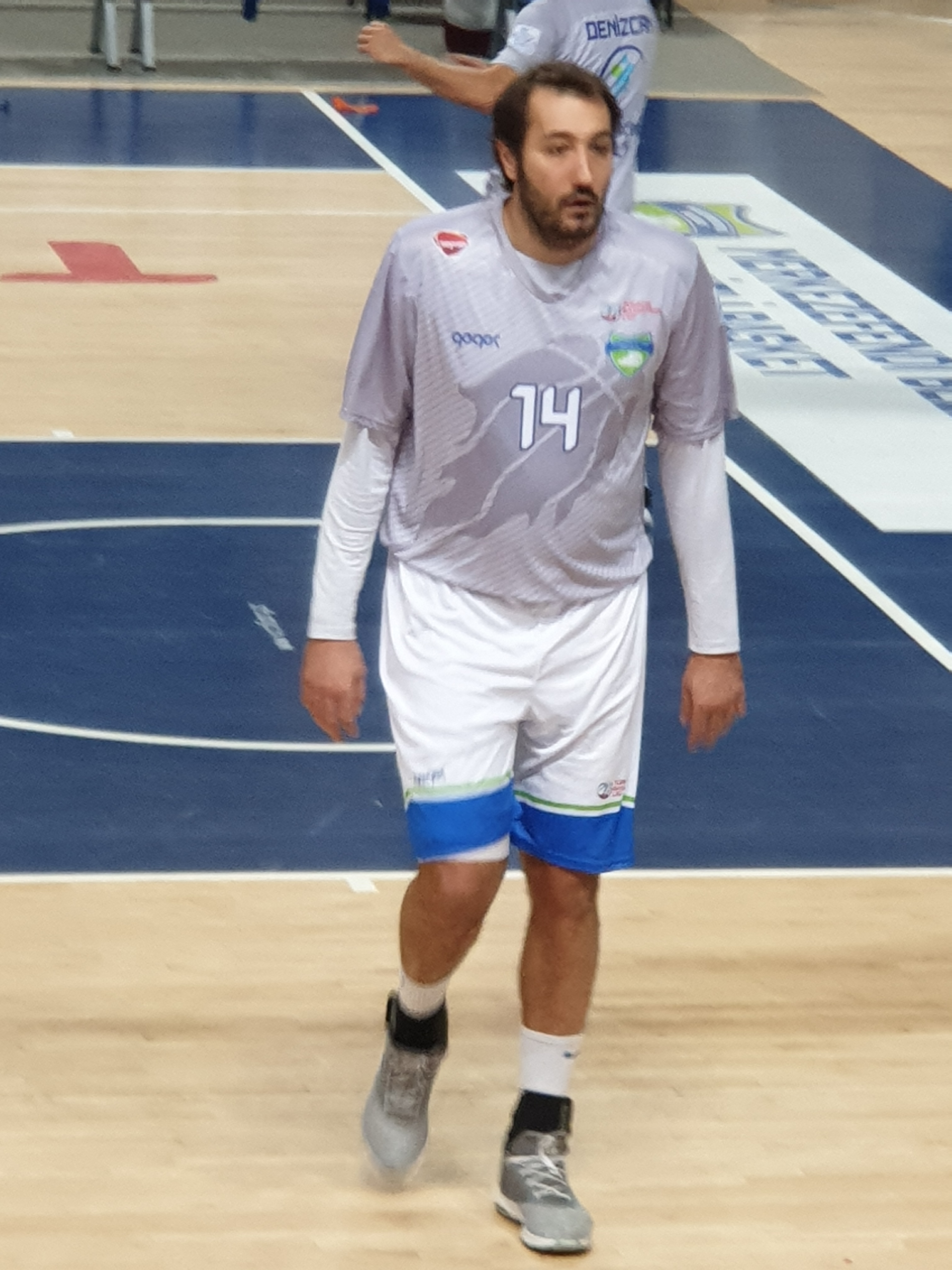

Personal information
- Born: May 27, 1987 (age 39) İzmir, Turkey
- Listed height: 6 ft 10.75 in (2.10 m)
- Listed weight: 264 lb (120 kg)

Career information
- NBA draft: 2009: undrafted
- Playing career: 2005–2025
- Position: Center

Career history
- 2005–2006: Tuborg Pilsener
- 2006–2008: Efes Pilsen
- 2008–2009: Rabotnički
- 2009–2010: Darüşşafaka
- 2010–2011: Banvit
- 2011–2012: Antalya BB
- 2012–2013: Pınar Karşıyaka
- 2013–2014: Aliağa Petkim
- 2014–2015: İstanbul BB
- 2015–2016: Yeşilgiresun Belediye
- 2016: Socar Petkim
- 2017–2018: Trabzonspor
- 2018: Selçuklu Üniversitesi
- 2018–2019: Sakarya BB
- 2019–2020: Konyaspor
- 2020: Merkezefendi Bld. Denizli Basket
- 2020–2021: Kocaeli Kağıt Spor
- 2021–2022: Fethiye Belediyespor
- 2022–2023: İstanbul BB
- 2023–2025: High Touch HT

Bora Hun Paçun (born May 27, 1987) is a Turkish former professional basketball player who played as a center. He is 6 ft 10.75 in (2.10 m) tall.

== Pro career ==
He started his pro-career with Turborg Pilsener in Turkish Basketball League 2005–06 season and played with them for a year till his transfer to Efes Pilsen. He played with Efes Pilsen between 2006 and 2009 then also played with Darüşşafaka for 2009–10 season, with Banvit for 2010–11 season and with Antalya BB for 2011–12 season. In the summer of 2012, he signed a contract with Pınar Karşıyaka.

On December 28, 2018, he has signed with Sakarya BB of the Turkish Basketball Super League.

== Awards and accomplishments ==
=== Turkish national team ===
- 2005 FIBA Europe Under-18 Championship: Silver
