= Petr Gubanov =

Russian basketball player

Personal information
- Born: April 3, 1987 (age 39) Kuybyshev, Russia
- Listed height: 6 ft 9.5 in (2.07 m)
- Listed weight: 232 lb (105 kg)

Career information
- NBA draft: 2009: undrafted
- Playing career: 2003–2020
- Position: Power forward / center

Career history
- 2003–2006: CSK VVS Samara
- 2006–2008: Khimki 2
- 2008–2009: Universitet Yugra Surgut
- 2009–2010: Khimki
- 2010–2011: Dynamo Moscow
- 2011–2012: UNICS
- 2012–2013: Enisey
- 2013–2014: Nizhny Novgorod
- 2014–2016: UNICS
- 2016–2018: Nizhny Novgorod
- 2018–2020: Khimki

Petr Sergeevich Gubanov (Russian: Пётр Сергеевич Губанов, born April 3, 1987) is a Russian former professional basketball player who last played for Khimki of the VTB United League and the EuroLeague. Standing at 2.07 m (6 ft 9 in), he played at the power forward and center positions.

== Professional career ==
Gubanov has played with the following clubs in his pro career: CSK VVS Samara, Universitet Yugra Surgut, Khimki Moscow Region, Dynamo Moscow, UNICS Kazan, Enisey Krasnoyarsk, and Nizhny Novgorod.

== Russian national team ==
Gubanov was a member of the junior national teams of Russia. With Russia's junior national teams, he played at the 2005 FIBA Europe Under-18 Championship, the 2006 FIBA Europe Under-20 Championship, and the 2007 FIBA Europe Under-20 Championship.

He has also been a member of the senior men's Russian national basketball team.
