= Anton Shoutvin =

Israeli basketball player

Anton Shoutvin אנטון שוטבין
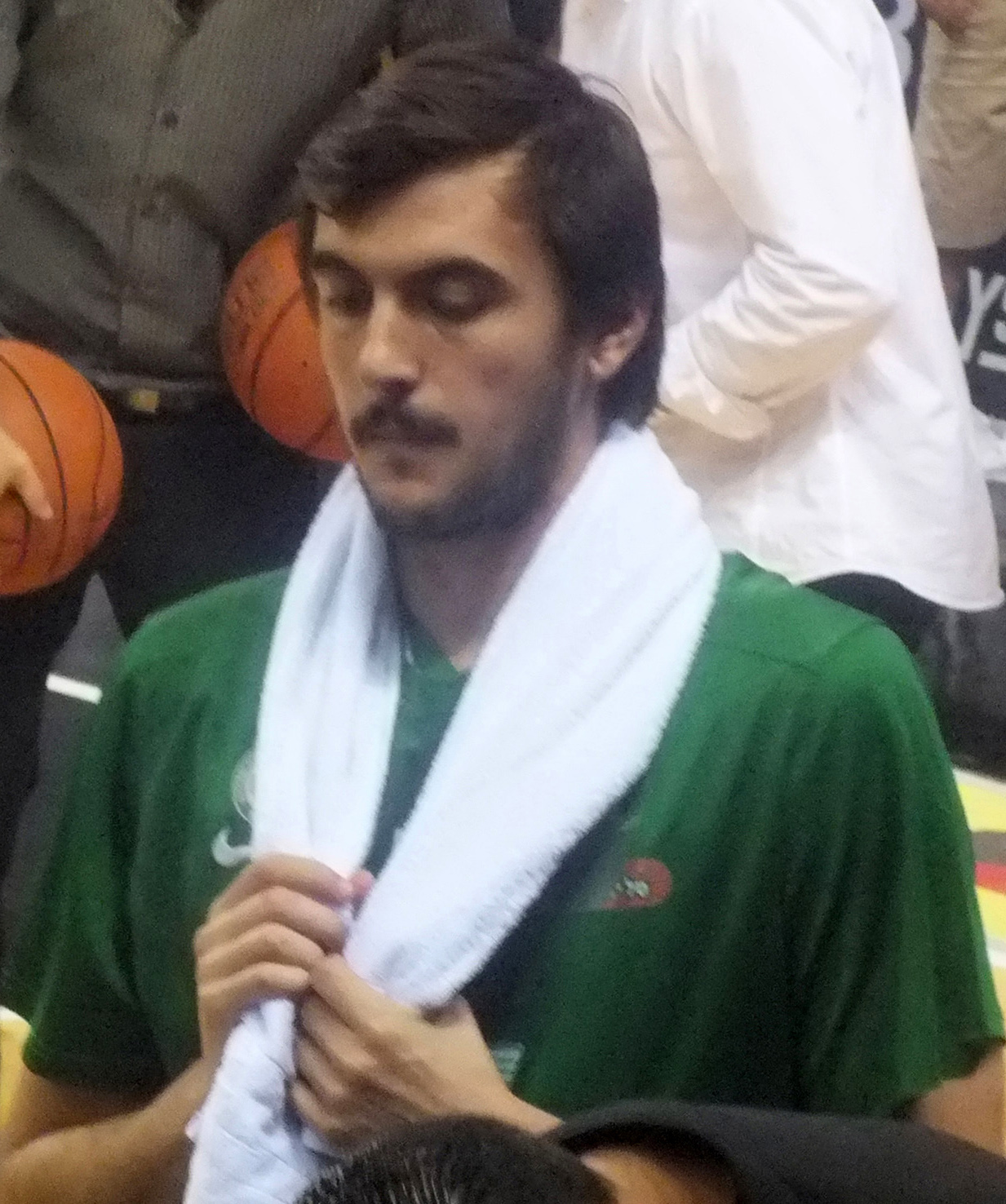
- Shoutvin with Maccabi Haifa in 2013

No. 5 – Hapoel Megiddo
- Position: Power forward / center
- League: Liga Artzit

Personal information
- Born: January 25, 1989 (age 37) Voroshilovgrad, Ukraine
- Listed height: 2.06 m (6 ft 9 in)
- Listed weight: 100 kg (220 lb)

Career information
- Playing career: 2007–present

Career history
- 2007–2008: Beitar Binyamina
- 2008: Givat Shmuel
- 2008–2009: Maccabi Tel Aviv
- 2009: Hapoel Gilboa Galil
- 2009–2010: Elitzur Yavne
- 2009–2010: Freiburg
- 2011–2012: Maccabi Ashdod
- 2012–2013: Maccabi Haifa
- 2013–2014: Ironi Nahariya
- 2014–2015: Maccabi Haifa
- 2015–2016: Hapoel Be'er Sheva
- 2016–2017: BK Iskra Svit
- 2017: Maccabi Haifa
- 2017: Ostrava
- 2017–2018: Gladiators Trier
- 2018: Maccabi Ashdod
- 2018–2019: Team FOG Næstved
- 2019–2020: Hallmann Vienna
- 2020–2025: Maccabi Haifa
- 2025–present: Hapoel Megiddo

Career highlights
- Israeli League champion (2013)

Anton Shoutvin (Hebrew: אנטון שוטבין; born January 25, 1989) is an Israeli professional basketball player for Hapoel Megiddo of the Israeli Liga Artzit.

== Early life ==
Shoutvin was born in Voroshilovgrad, Ukraine. He played for the Maccabi Tel Aviv Youth Team.

== Professional career ==
On April 25, 2017, Shoutvin signed with Maccabi Haifa of the Israeli Premier League.

On September 24, 2017, Shoutvin signed with Ostrava of the Czech National Basketball League (NBL).

On November 7, 2017, Shoutvin signed with Trier of the German Pro-A league.

On October 13, 2018, Shoutvin signed a two-month contract with Maccabi Ashdod. On December 12, 2018, Shoutvin signed with Team FOG Næstved for the rest of the season. In 19 games played for Næstved, he averaged 12.5 points and 4.4 rebounds per game.

On May 27, 2019, Shoutvin signed with Hallmann Vienna of the Austrian Basketball League.
