= Titus Nicoară =

Romanian basketball player

CS Vâlcea 1924
- Position: Power forward
- League: Liga Națională

Personal information
- Born: March 25, 1988 (age 38) Oradea, Romania
- Listed height: 6 ft 8 in (2.03 m)
- Listed weight: 220 lb (100 kg)

Career information
- NBA draft: 2010: undrafted

Career history
- 2005–2007: CSM Oradea
- 2007–2009: Traiskirchen Lions
- 2009–2013: CSM Mediaș
- 2013–2014: CSM Oradea
- 2014–2016: Steaua București
- 2016–2017: CSM Oradea
- 2017–2018: Argeș Pitești
- 2018–2020: CSM Mediaș
- 2020–2021: Steaua București
- 2021: Târgu Jiu
- 2021–2023: Steaua București
- 2023–2025: CSO Voluntari
- 2025–: CS Vâlcea 1924

Titus Nicoară (born March 25, 1988) is a Romanian basketball player who last played for CS Vâlcea 1924 of the Liga Națională and the Romanian national team.

He participated at the EuroBasket 2017.
