= Karsten Tadda =

German basketball player (born 1988)

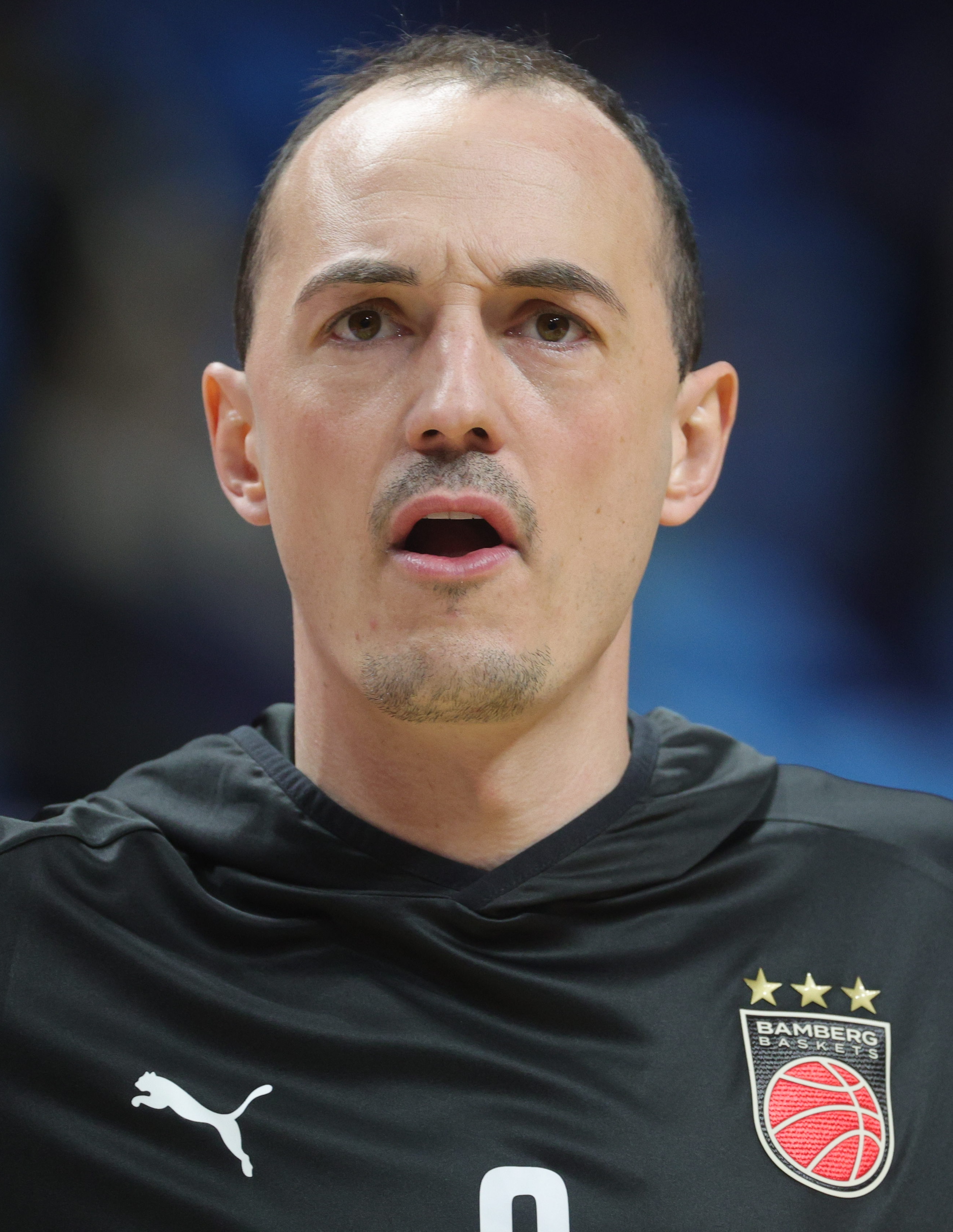
- Tadda with Bamberg in 2024

Free Agent
- Position: Shooting guard

Personal information
- Born: November 2, 1988 (age 38) Bamberg, West Germany
- Listed height: 6 ft 3 in (1.91 m)
- Listed weight: 202 lb (92 kg)

Career information
- NBA draft: 2010: undrafted
- Playing career: 2007–present

Career history
- 2007–2015: Brose Bamberg
- 2015–2016: Gießen 46ers
- 2016–2017: ratiopharm Ulm
- 2017–2021: EWE Baskets Oldenburg
- 2021–2023: Telekom Baskets Bonn
- 2023–2025: Brose Bamberg

Career highlights
- Champions League champion (2023); 2x BBL All-Star (2012, 2016); 5x German League champion (2010–2013, 2015); 3x German Cup champion (2010–2012); 5x German Supercup champion (2010–2012, 2015)

Karsten Tadda (born November 2, 1988) is a German professional basketball player who last played for Brose Bamberg of the Basketball Bundesliga (BBL). He played for the German national basketball team.

== Professional career ==
Tadda spent most of his career with Brose Baskets, and won the German League four times with Bamberg. In October 2015, during the 2015–16 season, he transferred to Gießen 46ers.

On June 14, 2016, Tadda signed with ratiopharm Ulm.

On June 17, 2021, he has signed with Telekom Baskets Bonn of the Basketball Bundesliga.

On June 23, 2023, he signed with Brose Bamberg of the Basketball Bundesliga (BBL).

== Career statistics ==
Legend
GP	Games played	GS	Games started	MPG	Minutes per game
FG%	Field-goal percentage	3P%	3-point field-goal percentage	FT%	Free-throw percentage
RPG	Rebounds per game	APG	Assists per game	SPG	Steals per game
BPG	Blocks per game	PPG	Points per game	PIR	Performance index rating
**Bold**	Career high

Led the league

=== Euroleague ===
Year	Team	GP	GS	MPG	FG%	3P%	FT%	RPG	APG	SPG	BPG	PPG	PIR
2009–10	Brose Baskets	3	0	3.0	.500	.000	.000	1.0	0.3	0.0	0.0	0.7	1.0
2010–11	Brose Baskets	10	1	9.3	.214	.200	.000	0.6	0.3	0.2	0.0	0.8	-0.3
2011–12	Brose Baskets	10	0	8.6	.571	.545	.667	0.7	0.5	0.3	0.0	2.4	2.0
2012–13	Brose Baskets	24	5	16.6	.347	.303	.783	1.6	1.0	0.6	0.0	3.3	3.2
2013–14	Brose Baskets	8	0	7.1	.333	.250	.1000	0.8	0.5	0.3	0.0	0.9	1.1
Career		55	6	11.7	.361	.322	.786	1.1	0.7	0.4	0.0	2.2	1.9
