= Bastian Doreth =

German basketball player (born 1989)

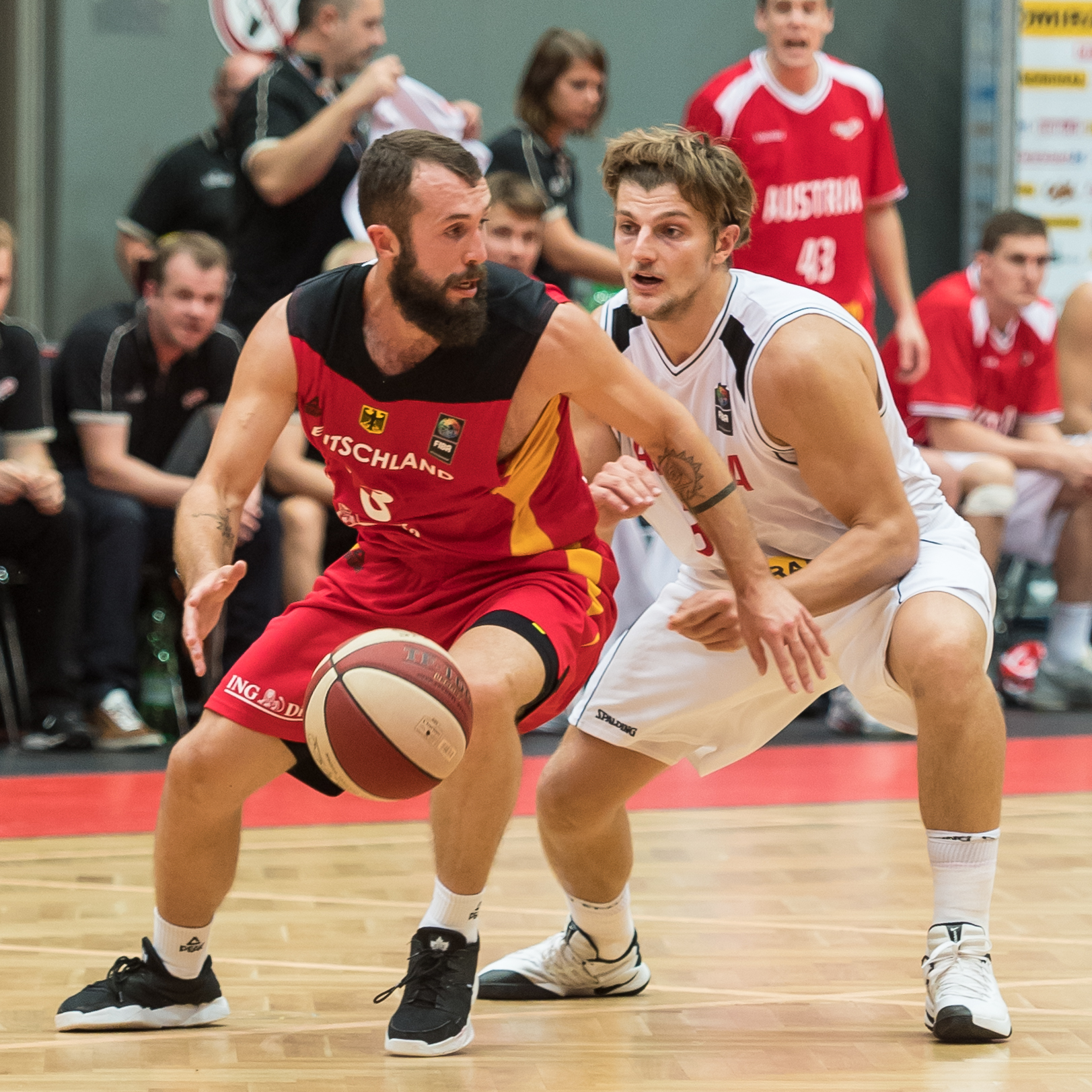
- Doreth (left) playing for Germany in 2016

No. 10 – hapa Ansbach Piranhas
- Position: Point guard
- League: 1. Regionalliga South-East

Personal information
- Born: 8 June 1989 (age 36) Nürnberg, Germany
- Listed height: 182 cm (6 ft 0 in)

Career information
- Playing career: 2007–present

Career history
- 2007–2008: Falke Nürnberg
- 2008–2010: Nürnberger BC
- 2010–2014: Bayern Munich
- 2012–2013: TBB Trier
- 2013–2015: Artland Dragons
- 2015–2023: Bayreuth
- 2023–2024: Nürnberg Falcons
- 2024–present: hapa Ansbach Piranhas

Bastian Doreth (born 8 June 1989) is a German basketball player for hapa Ansbach Piranhas of the German 1. Regionalliga South-East. He is a former member of the German national basketball team.

== Career ==
Born in the city of Nürnberg, Doreth played his first professional seasons with Falke Nürnberg and Nürnberger BC.

In 2010, Doreth signed with Bayern Munich but played one season on loan with TBB Trier.

Since 2015, Doreth plays with Medi Bayreuth. On 9 July 2020, he extended his contract until 2022.

After the relegation of Medi Bayreuth in the 2022/23 season, Doreth announced the signing of a contract with the Nürnberg Falcons BC. Doreth was born in the city of Nürnberg and is co-founder of the Falcon e. V., which engages in promoting and developing young players.
