= Chang Lin (basketball) =

Chinese basketball player

Chang Lin 常林
Personal information
- Born: November 28, 1988 (age 37) Harbin, Heilongjiang, China
- Listed height: 6 ft 9 in (2.06 m)
- Listed weight: 240 lb (109 kg)

Career information
- College: Long Beach State (2010–2011)
- NBA draft: 2012: undrafted
- Playing career: 2012–present
- Position: Power forward

Career history
- 2012–2013: Beijing Ducks
- 2014–2017: Jiangsu Dragons
- 2017–2022: Beijing Ducks
- 2022–2024: Shanxi Loongs
- 2024–2025: Ningbo Rockets

Chang Lin (Chinese: 常林; pinyin: cháng lín; born on 28 November 1988 in Harbin, Heilongjiang) is a Chinese professional basketball player. He played American college basketball for the Long Beach State 49ers.
