= Carl Lindbom (basketball) =

Finnish basketball player (born 1991)

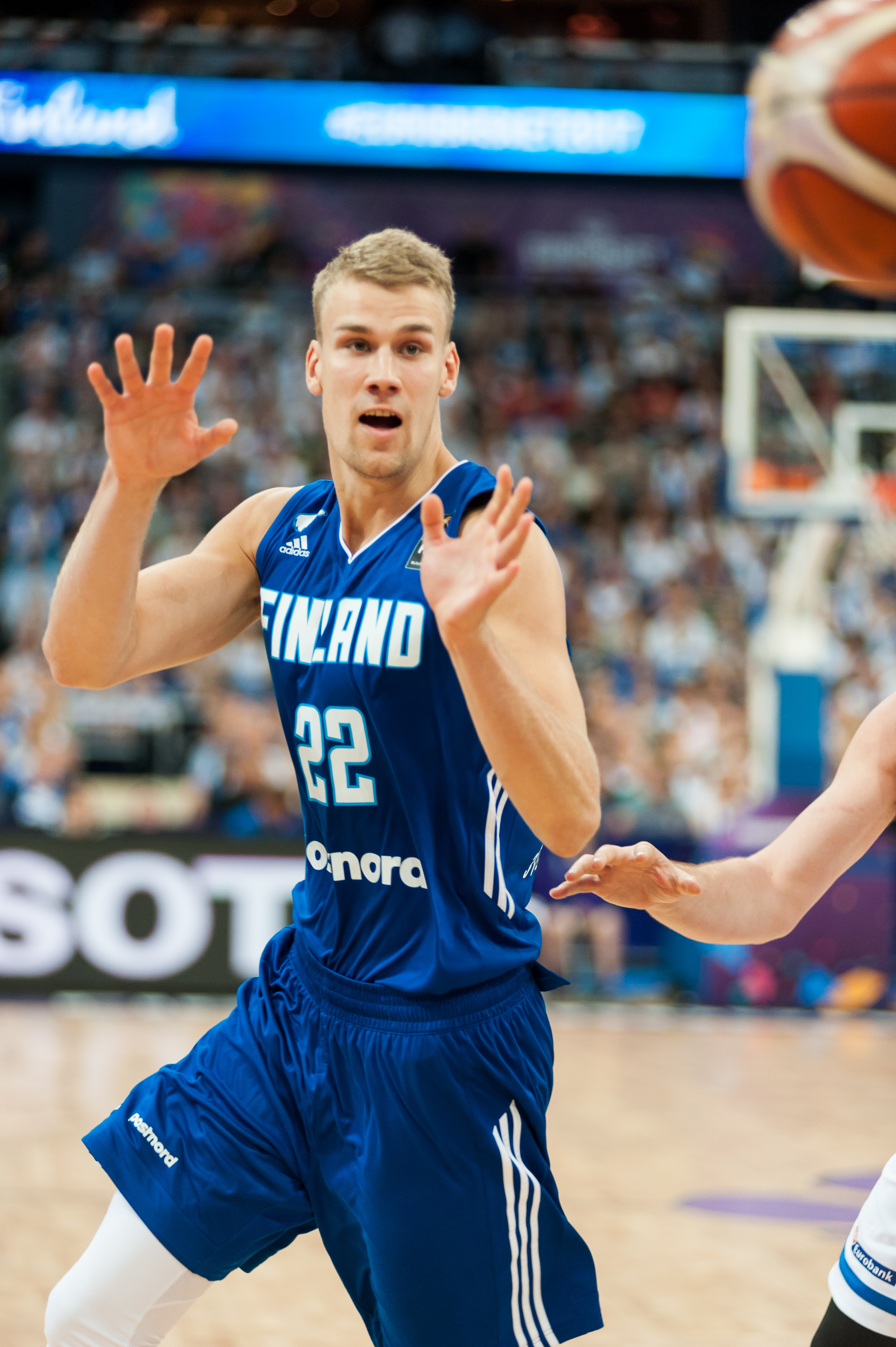
- Lindbom during EuroBasket 2017

Personal information
- Born: 10 November 1991 (age 34) Espoo, Finland
- Listed height: 2.06 m (6 ft 9 in)
- Listed weight: 100 kg (220 lb)

Career information
- Playing career: 2008–2024
- Position: Power forward / small forward
- Number: 11

Career history
- 2008–2010: Espoon Honka
- 2010–2011: Skyliners Frankfurt
- 2011: →Espoon Honka
- 2011–2012: Torpan Pojat
- 2012–2013: Tampereen Pyrintö
- 2013–2014: Bisons Loimaa
- 2014–2017: Helsinki Seagulls
- 2017: Juventus Utena
- 2017: Helsinki Seagulls
- 2017–2018: Vrijednosnice Osijek
- 2018–2020: Rosa Radom
- 2020–2021: Stal Ostrów Wielkopolski
- 2021: Antibes Sharks
- 2021: Trefl Sopot
- 2022: KR
- 2022–2024: Tapiolan Honka

Carl Lindbom (born 10 November 1991) is a Finnish former professional basketball player. Standing at 6 ft 9 in (2.06 m), he plays at the power forward position. He played with the Finland national basketball team at the 2017 EuroBasket.

Lindbom signed with Stal Ostrów Wielkopolski on October 24, 2020, replacing Victor Rudd. In February 2021, he joined Antibes Sharks of the LNB Pro B. Lindbom averaged 6.4 points and 3.3 rebounds per game.

On October 7, 2021, he signed with Trefl Sopot of the Polish Basketball League.

On January 14, 2022, Lindbom signed with KR of the Icelandic Úrvalsdeild karla. He announced his retirement in September 2024.

== Career statistics ==
Legend
GP	Games played	GS	Games started	MPG	Minutes per game
FG%	Field goal percentage	3P%	3-point field goal percentage	FT%	Free throw percentage
RPG	Rebounds per game	APG	Assists per game	SPG	Steals per game
BPG	Blocks per game	PPG	Points per game	**Bold**	Career high

=== EuroCup ===
Year	Team	GP	GS	MPG	FG%	3P%	FT%	RPG	APG	SPG	BPG	PPG	PIR
2013–14	Bisons Loimaa	5	0	8.7	.286	.125	.500	.4	.0	.2	.2	2.0	.2

=== National team ===
Team	Tournament	Pos.	GP	PPG	RPG	APG
Finland	EuroBasket 2017	11th	2	3.5	3.0	0.5
