= Edgaras Stanionis =

Lithuanian basketball player (born 1988)

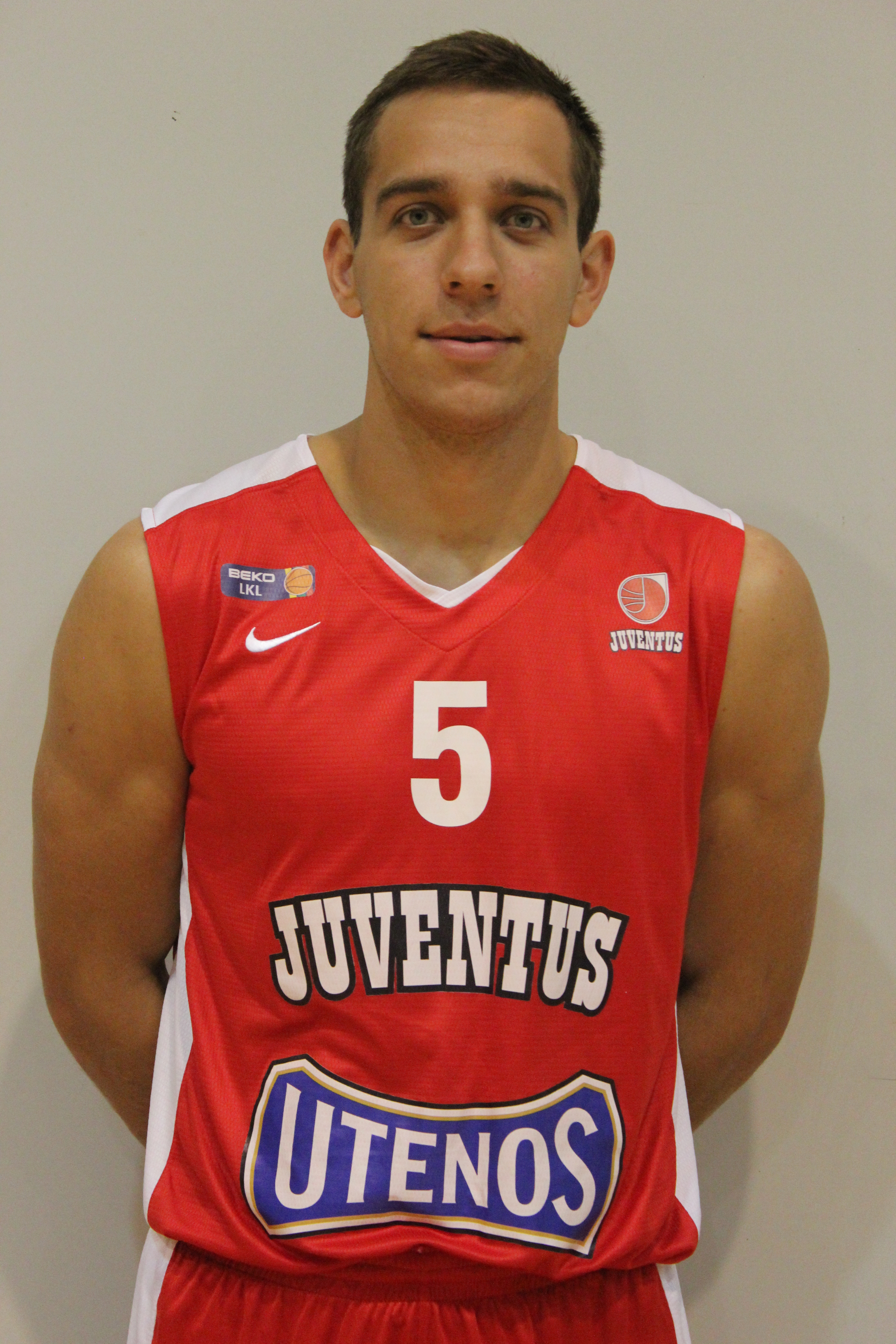
- Stanionis with Juventus Utena in 2014

Personal information
- Born: 24 February 1988 (age 38) Kaunas, Lithuanian SSR, Soviet Union
- Listed height: 1.94 m (6 ft 4 in)
- Listed weight: 95 kg (209 lb)

Career information
- Playing career: 2006–present
- Position: Shooting guard
- Number: 5

Career history
- 2006–2007: Bremena-KTU Tauragė (NKL)
- 2009–2010: Erelita-KTU Kaunas (NKL)
- 2010–2011: Šiauliai (LKL)
- 2011–2012: Lietkabelis Panevėžys (LKL)
- 2012–2013: Zanavykas Šakiai (NKL)
- 2013–2016: Juventus Utena (LKL)
- 2017–present: Juventus Utena
- 2017: Basketball Lamezia

Edgaras Stanionis (born 24 February 1988) is a professional Lithuanian basketball player. He plays for shooting guard position.
