= Luka Drča =

Serbian basketball player

Personal information
- Born: 26 August 1987 (age 39) Belgrade, SFR Yugoslavia
- Listed height: 1.95 m (6 ft 5 in)
- Listed weight: 90 kg (198 lb)

Career information
- College: Utah (2006–2010)
- NBA draft: 2010: undrafted
- Playing career: 2010–2019
- Position: Guard

Career history
- 2010–2011: Crvena zvezda
- 2011–2012: OKK Beograd
- 2012–2013: Astana
- 2013: Mega Vizura
- 2013–2014: OKK Beograd
- 2014: Rethymno Aegean
- 2015: Steaua București
- 2018–2019: Torlak

Luka Drča (Serbian Cyrillic: Лука Дрча; born 26 August 1987) is a Serbian former professional basketball player.

== National team career ==
Drča was member of the Serbian university basketball team what won the gold medal at the 2011 Summer Universiade in Shenzhen.
