= Europe World Championships =

Europe World Championships are World championships in sailing for the Europe class dinghy that have been held annually since 1966 (open event).

The event is organized by the host club on behalf of the International Europe Class Union and also recognized by World Sailing. Since 1978 the event is split into a female and a male event have been held in conjunction.

Europe was an Olympic class from 1992 to 2004.

The class has had additional World Championships organized by World Sailing when the class was used in the ISAF Youth Sailing World Championships and the IYRU Women's Sailing World Championships.

== Editions ==
Event			Host			Participation				Ref.
Ed.	Dates	Year	Host club	Location	Country	Gender	Ath.	Nat.	Cont.	Ref.
1		1966		Antibes	France	Open				
2		1967		Ostend	Belgium	Open				
3		1968		Madeira	Portugal	Open				
4		1969		Toulon	France	Open				
5		1970		Súdwest-Fryslân	Netherlands	Open				
6		1971		Ratzeburger See	West Germany	Open				
7		1972		Nyborg	Denmark	Open				
8		1973		Bandol	France	Open				
9		1974		Horten	Norway	Open				
10		1975		Palma de Mallorca	Spain	Open				
11		1976		Malmö	Sweden	Open				
12		1977				Open				
13		1978		Skovshoved	Denmark	Open				
13		1978		Skovshoved	Denmark	Female				
14		1979		La Rochelle	France	Open				
14		1979		La Rochelle	France	Female				
15a		1980		Helsinki	Finland	Open				
15b		1980		Grömitz	West Germany	Female				
16	1–10 August	1981		Horn	Netherlands	Open				
16	1–10 August	1981		Horn	Netherlands	Female				
17		1982		Monfalcone	Italy	Open				
17		1982		Monfalcone	Italy	Female				
18	1–6 August	1983		Fuengirola	Spain	Open				
18	1–6 August	1983		Fuengirola	Spain	Female				
19	20–27 July	1984		Kiel	West Germany	Open				
19	15–19 July	1984		Kiel	West Germany	Female				
20	21–26 July	1985		Tønsberg	Norway	Male				
20	14–20 July	1985		Tønsberg	Norway	Female				
21	26 July – 1 August	1986		Helsinki	Finland	Male				
21	21–25 July	1986		Helsinki	Finland	Female				
22	1–8 August	1987		Crozon-Morgat	France	Male				
22	1–8 August	1987		Crozon-Morgat	France	Female				
23	5–12 August	1988		Nieuwpoort	Belgium	Male				
23	5–12 August	1988		Nieuwpoort	Belgium	Female				
24		1989		Oxelösund	Sweden	Male				
24		1989		Oxelösund	Sweden	Female				
25	17–29 July	1990		Livorno	Italy	Male				
25	17–29 July	1990		Livorno	Italy	Female				
26	19–28 January	1991		Armação dos Búzios	Brazil	Male				
26	19–28 January	1991		Armação dos Búzios	Brazil	Female				
27	4–12 July	1992		Izola	Yugoslavia	Male				
27	4–12 July	1992		Izola	Yugoslavia	Female				
28	31 July – 8 August	1993		Kalø Vig	Denmark	Male				
28	31 July – 8 August	1993		Kalø Vig	Denmark	Female				
30	9–15 July	1994		La Rochelle	France	Male				
30	9–15 July	1994		La Rochelle	France	Female				
31	27 January – 4 February	1995		Auckland	New Zealand	Male				
31	27 January – 4 February	1995		Auckland	New Zealand	Female				
32	6–13 July	1996		Mallorca	Spain	Male				
32	6–13 July	1996		Mallorca	Spain	Female				
33	2–10 August	1997		San Francisco	United States	Male				
33	2–10 August	1997		San Francisco	United States	Female				
34	27 July – 2 August	1998		Travemünde	Germany	Male				
34	27 July – 2 August	1998		Travemünde	Germany	Female				
35	10–17 January	1999	Mornington Yacht Club	Melbourne	Australia	Male				
35	10–17 January	1999	Mornington Yacht Club	Melbourne	Australia	Female				
36	11–18 January	2000		Salvador	Brazil	Male				
36	11–18 January	2000		Salvador	Brazil	Female				
37	1–7 July	2001		Vilamoura	Portugal	Male	102	20	4	
37	1–7 July	2001		Vilamoura	Portugal	Female	134	30	5	
38	26 August – 3 September	2002		Hamilton	Canada	Male	48	13	3	
38	26 August – 3 September	2002		Hamilton	Canada	Female	108	27	5	
39	4–10 September	2003		Cádiz	Spain	Male	63	14	4	
	11–24 September	2003		Cádiz	Spain	Female	114	36	5	
40	10–17 July	2004		Cagliari	Italy	Male				
40	10–17 July	2004		Cagliari	Italy	Female	104	29	4	
41	1–9 September	2005		Rizhao	China	Male				
41	1–9 September	2005		Rizhao	China	Female				
42	8–16 July	2006		Copenhagen	Denmark	Male				
42	8–16 July	2006		Copenhagen	Denmark	Female	79	13	2	
43	16–27 July	2007		Workum	Netherlands	Male				
43	16–27 July	2007		Workum	Netherlands	Female				
44	4–12 July	2008		Vila Real de Santo António	Portugal	Male				
44	4–12 July	2008		Vila Real de Santo António	Portugal	Female				
45	24 July – 2 August	2009		Brest	France	Male	93	12	1	
45	24 July – 2 August	2009		Brest	France	Female				
46	23–31 July	2010		Arkösund	Sweden	Male	92	13	1	
46	23–31 July	2010		Arkösund	Sweden	Female	68	9	1	
47	8–15 August	2011		Gravedona	Italy	Male				
47	8–15 August	2011		Gravedona	Italy	Female	73	11	2	
48	12–24 July	2012		L'Escala	Spain	Male				
48	12–24 July	2012		L'Escala	Spain	Female	68	11	1	
49	3–11 August	2013		Sønderborg	Denmark	Male				
49	3–11 August	2013		Sønderborg	Denmark	Female				
50		2014		La Rochelle	France	Male	73	8	2	
50		2014		La Rochelle	France	Female	61	8	1	
51		2015		Arendal	Norway	Male	63	8	1	
51		2015		Arendal	Norway	Female	46	8	1	
52	7–13 July	2016		Torbole	Italy	Male	48	9	2	
52	7–13 July	2016		Torbole	Italy	Female	76	10	2	
53	1–12 July	2017	Club Vela Blanes	Blanes	Spain	Male	76	12	2	
53	1–12 July	2017	Club Vela Blanes	Blanes	Spain	Female	54	9	2	
54	5–11 August	2018	Segelclub Kühlungsborn	Kühlungsborn	Germany	Male	76	10	2	
54	5–11 August	2018	Segelclub Kühlungsborn	Kühlungsborn	Germany	Female	48	9	2	
55	29 July – 9 August	2019	CN El Balis	El Balis	Spain	Male	65	11	2	
55	29 July – 9 August	2019	CN El Balis	El Balis	Spain	Female	44	8	2	
N/A		2020		Råå	Sweden	postponed due to the COVID-19 pandemic				
56	10 July – 16 August	2021	Råå Jolleklubb	Råå	Sweden	Male	81	8	1	
56	10 July – 16 August	2021	Råå Jolleklubb	Råå	Sweden	Female	48	7	1	
57	1–12 July	2022	Société des Régates de Douarnenez	Douarnenez	France	Male	88	11	1	
57	1–12 July	2022	Société des Régates de Douarnenez	Douarnenez	France	Female	58	9	1	
58	8–14 July	2023	Vallensbaek Sejlklub	Vallensbæk	Denmark	Male	78	11	1	
58	8–14 July	2023	Vallensbaek Sejlklub	Vallensbæk	Denmark	Female	61	11	2	
59	28 Jul - 3 Aug	2024	Hangö Segelförening	Hanko	Finland	Male	55	8	1	
59	28 Jul - 3 Aug	2024	Hangö Segelförening	Hanko	Finland	Female	35	7	1	
60	17-21 July	2025	Circolo Torbole Vela	Torbole	Italy	Male	83	13	1	
60	17-21 July	2025	Circolo Torbole Vela	Torbole	Italy	Female	57	11	2	
61	7 - 12 July	2026		Gdansk	Poland	Male	62	13	1	
61	7 - 12 July	2026		Gdansk	Poland	Female	29	7	1	

== Multiple World champions ==
Compiled from the medallists tables below up to and including 2023.

Ranking	Sailor	Gold	Silver	Bronze	Total	No. Entries
1	Anna Livbjerg (DEN)	12	1	2	15	17
2	Sören Johnsen (DEN)	4	1	0	5	10
3	Lars Johan Brodtkorb (NOR)	3	4	2	9	13
4	Sven Stadel Seiler (ESP)	3	1	2	6	9
5	Kristine Roug (DEN)	3	1	1	5	6
6	Marit Söderström (SWE)	3	0	0	3	3
6	Andreas Svensson (DEN)	3	0	0	3	5
8	Pau Schilt Catafal (ESP)	2	2	1	5	9
9	Margriet Matthijsse (NED)	2	1	1	4	5
10	Siren Sundby (NOR)	2	1	0	3	7
10	Karin Andersson (NOR)	2	1	0	3	3
10	Carolijn Brouwer (NED)	2	1	0	3	9
13	Fabian Kirchhoff (GER)	2	0	1	3	6
14	Chiara Calligaris (ITA)	2	0	0	2	5
14	Serge Kats (NED)	2	0	0	2	2
14	Claude Jeandot (FRA)	2	0	0	2	2
14	Mattias Rham (SWE)	2	0	0	2	2

== Medalists ==
=== Open ===
Year	Gold	Silver	Bronze	Ref.
1966	Paul Maes (BEL)	P. Van Genabeek (BEL)	Bartoli (FRA)	
1967	M. Lambot (FRA)	Paul Maes (BEL)	Van Godtsenhoeven (BEL)	
1968	Paul Maes (BEL)	Stafler (FRA)	Cospen (FRA)	
1969	Stafler (FRA)	J. Demoulin (FRA)	Devillers (FRA)	
1970	Paul Maes (BEL)	Hervey (FRA)	C. Maes (BEL)	
1971	Klaus-Dieter Schultz (FRG)	François de Harlez (BEL)	J.-P. Bernard (BEL)	
1972	Christian Hervet (FRA)	Rolland Chutin (FRA)	Jørgen Holm Nilsen (DEN)	
1973	Frederic Russo (FRA)	Yves Silvestro (FRA)	Claude Jeandot (FRA)	
1974	Yves Silvestro (FRA)	Klaus-Dieter Schultz (FRG)	Pierre Saint-Jean (FRA)	
1975	Pierre Saint-Jean (FRA)	Christian Lunde (SWE)	Dan Persson (SWE)	
1976	Claude Jeandot (FRA)	Kim Christensen (DEN)	Pierre Saint-Jean (FRA)	
1977	Christian Lunde (SWE)	Kim Christensen (DEN)	Luc Van Keirsbilk (BEL)	

=== Men ===
Games	Gold	Silver	Bronze	Ref.
1978 Skovshoved	Hans Wallén (SWE)	Jonas Häggblom (SWE)	Peter Nerenst (DEN)	
1979 La Rochelle	Claude Jeandot (FRA)	Christian Hervet (FRA)	Jonas Häggblom (SWE)	
1980 Helsinki	Lars Christensen (NOR)	Erik Noret (FRA)	Hans Wallén (SWE)	
1981	Tom Jungell (FIN)	Henrik Eklund (FIN)	Christian Lunde (SWE)	
1982	Marco Pirinoli (FRA)	Peter Dykes (SWE)	Lennart L. Junggren (SWE)	
1983	no champion decided			
1984	Joachim Helmich (FRG)	Bo Petersen (DEN)	Hans Riber (DEN)	
1985	Ole Petter Pollen (NOR)	José Carlos Frau (ESP)	Johan Petterson (SWE)	
1986	Niklas Bechvid (SWE)	Niels Schjøth (DEN)	Kim Christensen (DEN)	
1987	Thomas Johansson (SWE)	Kim Christensen (DEN)	Søren Eselrup (DEN)	
1988	Serge Kats (NED)	Kim Christensen (DEN)	Raimo Selen (FIN)	
1989	Serge Kats (NED)	Stefan Rahm (SWE)	Jan Christiansen (DEN)	
1990	Jyrki Taiminen (FIN)	Matteo Binetti (ITA)	Ricardo Zabell (ESP)	
1991	Stefan Rahm (SWE)	Henrik Wallén (SWE)	Kim Christensen (DEN)	
1992 Izola	Petri Karto (FIN)	Potohar Samo (SLO)	Peer Moberg (NOR)	
1993	Olivier Baches (FRA)	Peder Rønholt (DEN)	Johan Molund (SWE)	
1994	Mattias Rahm (SWE)	Xavier Revil (FRA)	Johan Molund (SWE)	
1995	Mattias Rahm (SWE)	Johan Molund (SWE)	Carl Johan Åkeson (SWE)	
1996	Johan Molund (SWE)	Christoffer Sundby (NOR)	Rasmus Terp (DEN)	
1997	Christoffer Sundby (NOR)	Laurent Guillemette (FRA)	Jesper Melling (DEN)	
1998	Søren Johnsen (DEN)	Jacek Zbierski (POL)	Wouter van Catz (NED)	
1999	Søren Johnsen (DEN)	Peter Santén (SWE)	Dennis Dengsø (DEN)	
2000	Mats Wang Hansen (NOR)	Søren Johnsen (DEN)	Axel Netterlid (SWE)	
2001	Søren Johnsen (DEN)	Valérian Lebrun (FRA)	Jo Richard Aasvang (NOR)	
2002	Søren Johnsen (DEN)	Gerard Marín (ESP)	Pablo Arandia (ESP)	
2003 Cádiz	Fredrik Svensson (SWE)	Oscar Claeson (SWE)	Christopher Gundersen (NOR)	
2004 Cagliari	Christopher Gundersen (NOR)	Arvid Claeson (SWE)	Michael Risør (DEN)	
2005 Rizhao	Jesús Rogel (ESP)	Jiang Linuhua (CHN)	Sven Stadel (GER)	
2006 Skovshoved	Sven Stadel (GER)	Victor Bergström (SWE)	Jakob Ege Friis (DEN)	
2007 Workum	Mathias Mollat (NOR)	Jean-Christophe Gache (FRA)	Sven Stadel (ESP)	
2008 Santo Antonio	Teemu Rantanen (FIN)	Kristian Skarseth (NOR)	Charlie Ekberg (SWE)	
2009 Brest	Thomas Ribeaud (FRA)	Sven Stadel (ESP)	Anders Carlson (SWE)	
2010 Arkösund	Sven Stadel (ESP)	Tobias Hemdorff (DEN)	Kaarle Tapper (FIN)	
2011 Gravedona	Tobias Hemdorff (DEN)	Gerard Marín (ESP)	Magnus Andersen (NOR)	
2012	Gerard Marín (ESP)	Sylvain Notonier (FRA)	Nicholas Fadler Martinsen (NOR)	
2013	Mathias Livbjerg (DEN)	Lars Johan Brodtkorb (NOR)	Pau Schilt (ESP)	
2014	Lars Johan Brodtkorb (NOR)	Pau Schilt (ESP)	Sylvain Notonier (FRA)	
2015	Lars Johan Brodtkorb (NOR)	Emil Munch (DEN)	Oscar Bengtson (SWE)	
2016	Valérian Lebrun (FRA)	Lars Johan Brodtkorb (NOR)	Kristian Præst (DEN)	
2017	Sven Stadel (ESP)	Lars Johan Brodtkorb (NOR)	Fabian Kirchhoff (GER)	
2018	Fabian Kirchhoff (GER)	Lars Johan Brodtkorb (NOR)	Kristian Præst (DEN)	
2019	Pau Schilt (ESP)	Alejandro Pareja (ESP)	Lars Johan Brodtkorb (NOR)	
2020	postponed to 2021 due to the COVID-19 pandemic			
2021	Lars Johan Brodtkorb (NOR)	Pau Schilt (ESP)	Albin Johnsson (SWE)	
2022	Pau Schilt (ESP)	Daniel Cabré (ESP)	Lars Johan Brodtkorb (NOR)	
2023	Andreas Svensson (DEN)	Jonathan Llado Krensler (SWE)	Daniel Cabré (ESP)|	
2024	Andreas Svensson (DEN)	Oscar Thule (DEN)	Martin Brønlund Olesen (DEN)	
2025	Andreas Svensson (DEN)	Martin Bronlund Olesen (DEN)	Oscar Thule (DEN)	
2026	Martin Brønlund Olesen (DEN)	Cyril Richard (FRA)	Jeremi Zimny (POL)	

=== Women ===
Year	Gold	Silver	Bronze
1978	Marit Söderström (SWE)		
1979	Marit Söderström (SWE)	Chaudun (FRA)	Lefort (FRA)
1980	S. Krenninger (FRA)	A. Lefort (FRA)	M. Andersson (SWE)
1981	Marit Söderström (SWE)	S. Krenninger (FRA)	Lone Sørensen (DEN)
1982	Véronique Aulnette (FRA)	Susanne Erikson (SWE)	Ulrika Wallin (SWE)
1983	no champion decided		
1984	Karin Andersson (SWE)	Frédérique Fèvre (FRA)	Lone Sørensen (DEN)
1985	Karin Andersson (SWE)	Mette Munch (DEN)	Malin Hulten (SWE)
1986	Ida Andersen (NOR)	Mette Munch (DEN)	Tordis Lerøen (NOR)
1987	Tonje Kristiansen (NOR)	Mette Munch (DEN)	Arianna Bogatec (ITA)
1988	Sabina De Martino (ITA)	Linda Andersen (NOR)	Laurence Nicolas (FRA)
1989	Chiara Calligaris (ITA)	Courtenay Becker (USA)	Tordis Lerøen (NOR)
1990	Chiara Calligaris (ITA)	Min Dezillie (BEL)	Sabrina Landi (ITA)
1991	Carole Reitzer (FRA)	Karin Andersson (SWE)	Dorte Jensen (DEN)
1992	Malin Millbourn (SWE)	J. Bellemans (BEL)	C. Nordqvist (SWE)
1993	Dorte Jensen (DEN)	Shirley Robertson (GBR)	Zilla Fokke (NED)
1994	Kristine Roug (DEN)	Tine Moberg-Parker (CAN)	Margriet Matthijsse (NED)
1995	Kristine Roug (DEN)	Margriet Matthijsse (NED)	Natalia Vía Dufresne (ESP)
1996	Carolijn Brouwer (NED)	Karianne Eikeland (NOR)	Carolina Toll (NOR)
1997	Margriet Matthijsse (NED)	Kristine Roug (DEN)	Melanie Dennison (AUS)
1998	Carolijn Brouwer (NED)	Shirley Robertson (GBR)	Kristine Roug (DEN)
1999	Margriet Matthijsse (NED)	Melanie Dennison (AUS)	Shirley Robertson (GBR)
2000	Kristine Roug (DEN)	Shirley Robertson (GBR)	Meg Galliard (USA)
2001	Sari Multala (FIN)	Carolijn Brouwer (NED)	Lenka Šmídová (CZE)
2002	Sarah Blanck (AUS)	Siren Sundby (NOR)	Petra Niemann (GER)
2003	Siren Sundby (NOR)	Sari Multala (FIN)	Meg Galliard (USA)
2004	Siren Sundby (NOR)	Sari Multala (FIN)	Petra Niemann (GER)
2005	Shen Xiaoying (CHN)	Lu Lianhua (CHN)	Tania Elías Calles (MEX)
2006	Sandra Sandqvist (SWE)	Sarah Bregendahl (DEN)	Helen Montilla (ESP)
2007	Svenja Puls (GER)	Josefine Boel (DEN)	Anna Livbjerg (DEN)
2008 Santo Antonio	Josefin Olsson (SWE)	Anne-Marie Rindom (DEN)	Anette Viborg Andreasen (DEN)
2009	Anne-Marie Rindom (DEN)	Anette Viborg Andreasen (DEN)	Ascensión Roca (ESP)
2010	Elisabet Llargués (ESP)	Hanna Klinga (SWE)	Anna Livbjerg (DEN)
2011	Silvia Zennaro (ITA)	Anna Livbjerg (DEN)	Janika Puls (GER)
2012	Anna Livbjerg (DEN)	Anna Mikkelsen (SWE)	Silvia Zennaro (ITA)
2013	Anna Livbjerg (DEN)	Ascensión Roca (ESP)	Kristine Mauritzen (DEN)
2014	Anna Livbjerg (DEN)	Kristine Mauritzen (DEN)	Mathilde Géron (FRA)
2015	Anna Livbjerg (DEN)	Vilma Bobeck (SWE)	Anna Munch (DEN)
2016	Anna Livbjerg (DEN)	Anna Munch (DEN)	Janika Puls (GER)
2017	Anna Livbjerg (DEN)	Anna Munch (DEN)	Ascensión Roca (ESP)
2018	Anna Livbjerg (DEN)	Ascensión Roca (ESP)	Stine Schreibe (GER)
2019	Anna Livbjerg (DEN)	Ascensión Roca (ESP)	Elisabet Llargués (ESP)
2020	postponed to 2021 due to the COVID-19 pandemic		
2021	Anna Livbjerg (DEN)	Trine Bentzen (DEN)	Ascensión Roca (ESP)
2022	Anna Livbjerg (DEN)	Julia Büsselberg (GER)	Ascensión Roca (ESP)
2023	Anna Livbjerg (DEN)	Ascensión Roca (ESP)	Sophie Menke (GER)
2024	Anna Livbjerg (DEN)	Maja Brønlund Olesen (DEN)	Weronika Folmer (POL)
2025	Camilla Svensson (DEN)	Susanne Sailer (GER)	Sophie Menke (GER)
2026	Marie-Amandine Vandeghinste (BEL)	Sophie Menke (GER)	Weronika Glinkiewicz-Madej (POL)

== See also ==
- ISAF Sailing World Championships
