= Europe (dinghy) =

International racing sailing class

International Europe
- Class symbol

Development
- Designer: Alois Roland
- Location: Belgium
- Year: 1960
- Design: One-Design

Boat
- Crew: 1
- Draft: 0.15 m (5.9 in); 1.0 m (3 ft 3 in)

Hull
- Type: Monohull
- Construction: GRP; Cold moulded plywood Composite
- Hull weight: 45 kg (99 lb)
- LOA: 3.35 m (11.0 ft)
- Beam: 1.38 m (4 ft 6 in)

Hull appendages
- Keel: Daggerboard

Rig
- Rig type: Bermuda rig
- Mast height: 4.895 m (16.06 ft)

Sails
- Mainsail area: 7 m^{2} (75 sq ft)

Rating
- D-PN: 92.8
- RYA PN: 1145

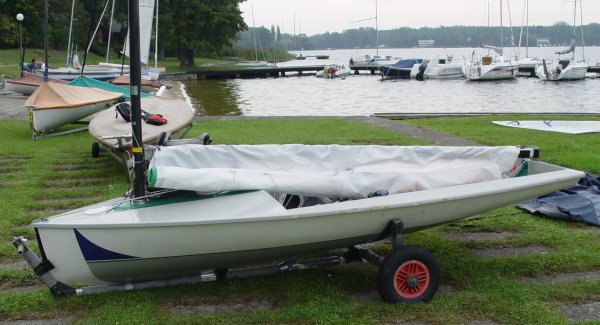
The Europe dinghy on land

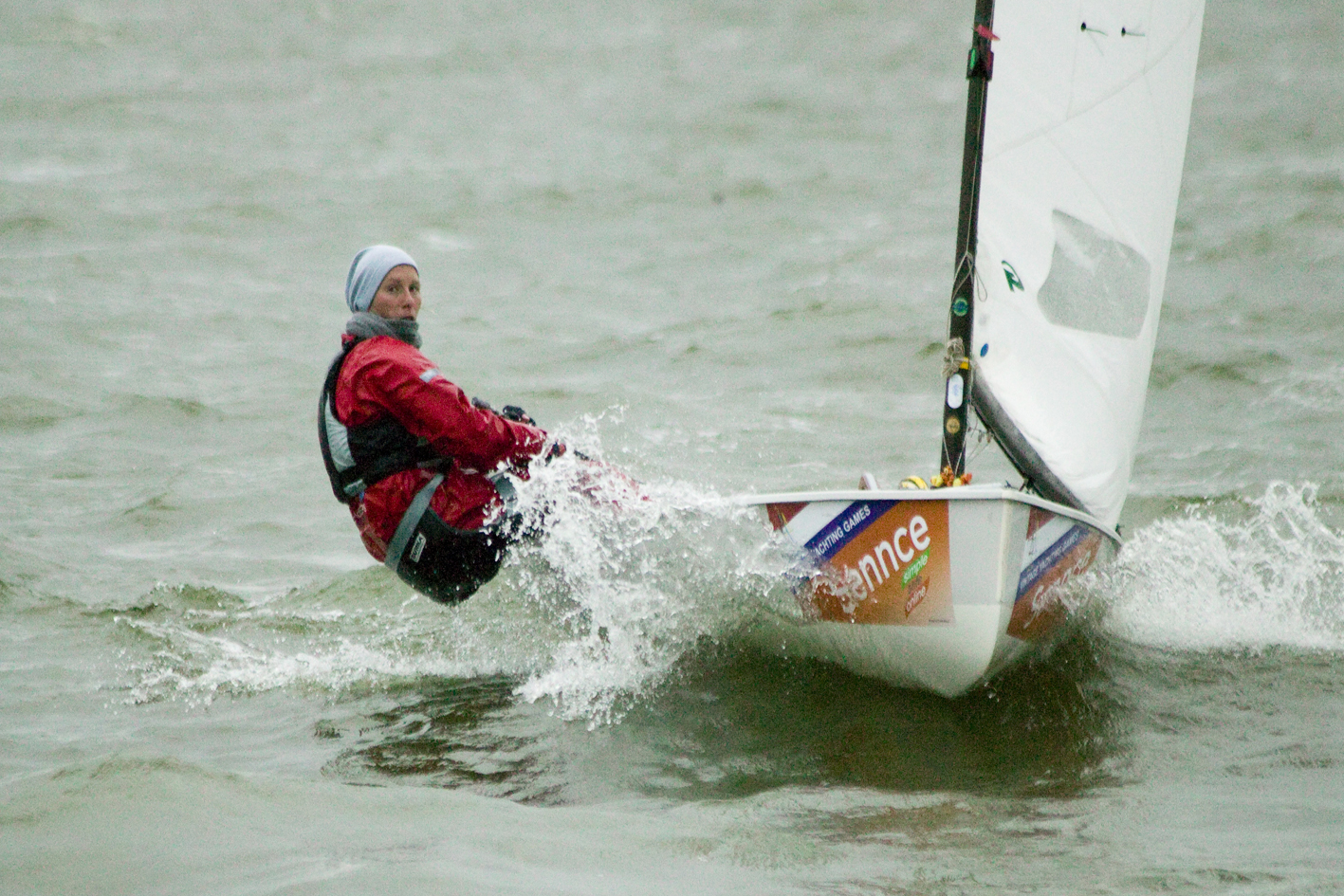
Europe during the 2008 Vintage Yachting Games

The Europe is a one-person dinghy designed in Belgium in 1960 by Alois Roland as a class legal Moth dinghy. The design later changed into its own one-design class.

The dinghy is ideal for sailors weighing 50–85 kilos. The hull is made of fibre glass and weighs 45 kg, fully rigged 60 kg. The dinghy is tapering in the stem and round in the bottom. The sail is made of dacron. The mast is made of carbon fibre and specially designed to the sailor. A soft mast is best for light sailors, while heavier sailors use stiffer masts. Sails are also specially designed according to mast stiffness and crew weight.

The Europe was introduced as an Olympic class in the 1992 Summer Olympics as the women's single-handed dinghy. It was replaced by the Laser Radial in the 2008 Summer Olympics.

Since 2008 the Europe is one of the Vintage Yachting Classes at the Vintage Yachting Games.

== Events ==
=== Olympic Games ===
Rank	Nation	Gold	Silver	Bronze	Total
1	Norway	2	0	0	2
2	Denmark	1	0	1	2
3	Great Britain	1	0	0	1
4	Netherlands	0	2	0	2
5	Czech Republic	0	1	0	1
5	Spain	0	1	0	1
7	United States	0	0	2	2
8	Argentina	0	0	1	1
Totals (8 entries)		4	4	4	12

Event	Gold	Silver	Bronze
1992 Barcelona	Norway (NOR); Linda Cerup-Simonsen	Spain (ESP); Natalia Vía Dufresne	United States (USA); Julia Trotman
1996 Atlanta	Denmark (DEN); Kristine Roug	Netherlands (NED); Margriet Matthijsse	United States (USA); Courtenay Becker-Dey
2000 Sydney	Great Britain (GBR); Shirley Robertson	Netherlands (NED); Margriet Matthijsse	Argentina (ARG); Serena Amato
2004 Athens	Norway (NOR); Siren Sundby	Czech Republic (CZE); Lenka Šmídová	Denmark (DEN); Signe Livbjerg

=== Asian Games Women's ===
Rank	Nation	Gold	Silver	Bronze	Total
1	China (CHN)	2	0	0	2
2	Japan (JPN)	0	2	0	2
3	Singapore (SIN)	0	0	1	1
3	South Korea (KOR)	0	0	1	1
Totals (4 entries)		2	2	2	6

Event	Gold	Silver	Bronze
2002 Pusan	China (CHN); Lu Chunfeng	Japan (JPN); Maiko Sato	South Korea (KOR); Hong Jing-Young
1998 Bangkok	China (CHN); Zhang Hong	Japan (JPN); Aiko Saito	Singapore (SIN); Tracey Tan

=== Pan American Games Women's ===
Rank	Nation	Gold	Silver	Bronze	Total
1	Brazil (BRA)	1	1	0	2
2	Argentina (ARG)	1	0	0	1
3	United States (USA)	0	1	0	1
4	Bermuda (BER)	0	0	1	1
4	Mexico (MEX)	0	0	1	1
Totals (5 entries)		2	2	2	6

Event	Gold	Silver	Bronze
1995 Mar del Plata	Brazil (BRA); Márcia Pellicano	United States (USA); Kimberly Logan	Bermuda (BER); Paula Lewin
1999 Winnipeg	Argentina (ARG); Serena Amato	Brazil (BRA); Fernanda Pinto	Mexico (MEX); Tanía Elias Calles

=== World Championship ===
==== Open ====
Year	Gold	Silver	Bronze
1966 Antibes	Paul Maes (BEL)	P. Van Genabeek (BEL)	Bartoli (FRA)
1967 Ostende	M. Lambot (FRA)	Paul Maes (BEL)	Van Godtsenhoeven (BEL)
1968 Madeira	Paul Maes (BEL)	Stafler (FRA)	Cospen (FRA)
1969 Toulon	Stafler (FRA)	J. Demoulin (FRA)	Devillers (FRA)
1970 Fluessen	Paul Maes (BEL)	Hervey (FRA)	C. Maes (BEL)
1971 Ratzeburger See	Klaus-Dieter Schultz (FRG)	François de Harlez (BEL)	J.-P. Bernard (BEL)
1972 Nyborg	Christian Hervet (FRA)	Rolland Chutin (FRA)	Jørgen Holm Nilsen (DEN)
1973 Bandol	Frederic Russo (FRA)	Yves Silvestro (FRA)	Claude Jeandot (FRA)
1974 Horten	Yves Silvestro (FRA)	Klaus-Dieter Schultz (FRG)	Pierre Saint-Jean (FRA)
1975 C'an Pastilla	Pierre Saint-Jean (FRA)	Christian Lunde (SWE)	Dan Persson (SWE)
1976 Malmö	Claude Jeandot (FRA)	Kim Christensen (DEN)	Pierre Saint-Jean (FRA)
1977	Christian Lunde (SWE)	Kim Christensen (DEN)	Luc Van Keirsbilk (BEL)

==== Men ====
Year	Gold	Silver	Bronze
1978 Skovshoved	Hans Wallén (SWE)	Jonas Häggblom (SWE)	Peter Nerenst (DEN)
1979 La Rochelle	Claude Jeandot (FRA)	Christian Hervet (FRA)	Jonas Häggblom (SWE)
1980 Helsinki	Lars Christensen (NOR)	Erik Noret (FRA)	Hans Wallén (SWE)
1981 Hoorn	Tom Jungell (FIN)	Henrik Eklund (FIN)	Christian Lunde (SWE)
1982 Monfalcone	Marco Pirinoli (FRA)	Peter Dykes (SWE)	Lennart L. Junggren (SWE)
1983 Fuengirola	no champion decided		
1984 Kiel	Joachim Helmich (FRG)	Bo Petersen (DEN)	Hans Riber (DEN)
1985 Tønsberg	Ole Petter Pollen (NOR)	José Carlos Frau (ESP)	Johan Petterson (SWE)
1986 Helsinki	Niklas Bechvid (SWE)	Niels Schjøth (DEN)	Kim Christensen (DEN)
1987 Crozon-Morgat	Thomas Johansson (SWE)	Kim Christensen (DEN)	Søren Eselrup (DEN)
1988 Nieuwpoort	Serge Kats (NED)	Kim Christensen (DEN)	Raimo Selen (FIN)
1989 Oxelösund	Serge Kats (NED)	Stefan Rahm (SWE)	Jan Christiansen (DEN)
1990 Livorno	Jyrki Taiminen (FIN)	Matteo Binetti (ITA)	Ricardo Zabell (ESP)
1991 Armação dos Búzios	Stefan Rahm (SWE)	Henrik Wallén (SWE)	Kim Christensen (DEN)
1992 Izola	Petri Karto (FIN)	Potohar Samo (SLO)	Peer Moberg (NOR)
1993 Kaløvig	Olivier Baches (FRA)	Peder Rønholt (DEN)	Johan Molund (SWE)
1994 La Rochelle	Mattias Rahm (SWE)	Xavier Revil (FRA)	Johan Molund (SWE)
1995 North Shore City	Mattias Rahm (SWE)	Johan Molund (SWE)	Carl Johan Åkeson (SWE)
1996 Palma de Mallorca	Johan Molund (SWE)	Christoffer Sundby (NOR)	Rasmus Terp (DEN)
1997 San Francisco	Christoffer Sundby (NOR)	Laurent Guillemette (FRA)	Jesper Melling (DEN)
1998 Travemünde	Søren Johnsen (DEN)	Jacek Zbierski (POL)	Wouter van Catz (NED)
1999 Mornington	Søren Johnsen (DEN)	Peter Santén (SWE)	Dennis Dengsø (DEN)
2000 Salvador	Mats Wang Hansen (NOR)	Søren Johnsen (DEN)	Axel Netterlid (SWE)
2001 Vilamoura	Søren Johnsen (DEN)	Valérian Lebrun (FRA)	Jo Richard Aasvang (NOR)
2002 Hamilton	Søren Johnsen (DEN)	Gerard Marín (ESP)	Pablo Arandia (ESP)
2003 Cádiz	Fredrik Svensson (SWE)	Oscar Claeson (SWE)	Christopher Gundersen (NOR)
2004 Cagliari	Christopher Gundersen (NOR)	Arvid Claeson (SWE)	Michael Risør (DEN)
2005 Rizhao	Jesús Rogel (ESP)	Jiang Linuhua (CHN)	Sven Stadel (GER)
2006 Skovshoved	Sven Stadel (GER)	Victor Bergström (SWE)	Jakob Ege Friis (DEN)
2007 Workum	Mathias Mollat (NOR)	Jean-Christophe Gache (FRA)	Sven Stadel (ESP)
2008 Santo Antonio	Teemu Rantanen (FIN)	Kristian Skarseth (NOR)	Charlie Ekberg (SWE)
2009 Brest	Thomas Ribeaud (FRA)	Sven Stadel (ESP)	Anders Carlson (SWE)
2010 Arkösund	Sven Stadel (ESP)	Tobias Hemdorff (DEN)	Kaarle Tapper (FIN)
2011 Gravedona	Tobias Hemdorff (DEN)	Gerard Marín (ESP)	Magnus Andersen (NOR)
2012 L'Escala	Gerard Marín (ESP)	Sylvain Notonier (FRA)	Nicholas Fadler Martinsen (NOR)
2013 Sønderborg	Mathias Livbjerg (DEN)	Lars Johan Brodtkorb (NOR)	Pau Schilt (ESP)
2014 La Rochelle	Lars Johan Brodtkorb (NOR)	Pau Schilt (ESP)	Sylvain Notonier (FRA)
2015 Arendal	Lars Johan Brodtkorb (NOR)	Emil Munch (DEN)	Oscar Bengtson (SWE)
2016 Torbole	Valérian Lebrun (FRA)	Lars Johan Brodtkorb (NOR)	Kristian Præst (DEN)
2017 Blanes	Sven Stadel (ESP)	Lars Johan Brodtkorb (NOR)	Fabian Kirchhoff (GER)
2018 Kühlungsborn	Fabian Kirchhoff (GER)	Lars Johan Brodtkorb (NOR)	Kristian Præst (DEN)
2019 El Balis	Pau Schilt (ESP)	Alejandro Pareja (ESP)	Lars Johan Brodtkorb (NOR)
2020 Råå	postponed to 2021 due to the COVID-19 pandemic		
2021 Råå	Lars Johan Brodtkorb (NOR)	Pau Schilt (ESP)	Albin Johnsson (SWE)
2022 Douarnenez	Pau Schilt (ESP)	Daniel Cabré (ESP)	Lars Johan Brodtkorb (NOR)

==== Women ====
Year	Gold	Silver	Bronze
1978 Skovshoved	Marit Söderström (SWE)		
1979 La Rochelle	Marit Söderström (SWE)	Chaudun (FRA)	Lefort (FRA)
1980 Grömitz	S. Krenninger (FRA)	A. Lefort (FRA)	M. Andersson (SWE)
1981 Hoorn	Marit Söderström (SWE)	S. Krenninger (FRA)	Lone Sørensen (DEN)
1982 Monfalcone	Véronique Aulnette (FRA)	Susanne Erikson (SWE)	Ulrika Wallin (SWE)
1983 Fuengirola	no champion decided		
1984 Kiel	Karin Andersson (SWE)	Frédérique Fèvre (FRA)	Lone Sørensen (DEN)
1985 Tønsberg	Karin Andersson (SWE)	Mette Munch (DEN)	Malin Hulten (SWE)
1986 Helsinki	Ida Andersen (NOR)	Mette Munch (DEN)	Tordis Lerøen (NOR)
1987 Crozon-Morgat	Tonje Kristiansen (NOR)	Mette Munch (DEN)	Arianna Bogatec (ITA)
1988 Nieuwpoort	Sabina De Martino (ITA)	Linda Andersen (NOR)	Laurence Nicolas (FRA)
1989 Oxelösund	Chiara Calligaris (ITA)	Courtenay Becker (USA)	Tordis Lerøen (NOR)
1990 Livorno	Chiara Calligaris (ITA)	Min Dezillie (BEL)	Sabrina Landi (ITA)
1991 Armação dos Búzios	Carole Reitzer (FRA)	Karin Andersson (SWE)	Dorte Jensen (DEN)
1992 Izola	Malin Millbourn (SWE)	J. Bellemans (BEL)	C. Nordqvist (SWE)
1993 Kaløvig	Dorte Jensen (DEN)	Shirley Robertson (GBR)	Zilla Fokke (NED)
1994 La Rochelle	Kristine Roug (DEN)	Tine Moberg-Parker (CAN)	Margriet Matthijsse (NED)
1995 North Shore City	Kristine Roug (DEN)	Margriet Matthijsse (NED)	Natalia Vía Dufresne (ESP)
1996 Palma de Mallorca	Carolijn Brouwer (NED)	Karianne Eikeland (NOR)	Carolina Toll (NOR)
1997 San Francisco	Margriet Matthijsse (NED)	Kristine Roug (DEN)	Melanie Dennison (AUS)
1998 Travemünde	Carolijn Brouwer (NED)	Shirley Robertson (GBR)	Kristine Roug (DEN)
1999 Mornington	Margriet Matthijsse (NED)	Melanie Dennison (AUS)	Shirley Robertson (GBR)
2000 Salvador	Kristine Roug (DEN)	Shirley Robertson (GBR)	Meg Galliard (USA)
2001 Vilamoura	Sari Multala (FIN)	Carolijn Brouwer (NED)	Lenka Šmídová (CZE)
2002 Hamilton	Sarah Blanck (AUS)	Siren Sundby (NOR)	Petra Niemann (GER)
2003 Cádiz	Siren Sundby (NOR)	Sari Multala (FIN)	Meg Galliard (USA)
2004 Cagliari	Siren Sundby (NOR)	Sari Multala (FIN)	Petra Niemann (GER)
2005 Rizhao	Shen Xiaoying (CHN)	Lu Lianhua (CHN)	Tania Elías Calles (MEX)
2006 Skovshoved	Sandra Sandqvist (SWE)	Sarah Bregendahl (DEN)	Helen Montilla (ESP)
2007 Workum	Svenja Puls (GER)	Josefine Boel (DEN)	Anna Livbjerg (DEN)
2008 Santo Antonio	Josefin Olsson (SWE)	Anne-Marie Rindom (DEN)	Anette Viborg Andreasen (DEN)
2009 Brest	Anne-Marie Rindom (DEN)	Anette Viborg Andreasen (DEN)	Ascensión Roca (ESP)
2010 Arkösund	Elisabet Llargués (ESP)	Hanna Klinga (SWE)	Anna Livbjerg (DEN)
2011 Gravedona	Silvia Zennaro (ITA)	Anna Livbjerg (DEN)	Janika Puls (GER)
2012 L'Escala	Anna Livbjerg (DEN)	Anna Mikkelsen (SWE)	Silvia Zennaro (ITA)
2013 Sønderborg	Anna Livbjerg (DEN)	Ascensión Roca (ESP)	Kristine Mauritzen (DEN)
2014 La Rochelle	Anna Livbjerg (DEN)	Kristine Mauritzen (DEN)	Mathilde Géron (FRA)
2015 Arendal	Anna Livbjerg (DEN)	Vilma Bobeck (SWE)	Anna Munch (DEN)
2016 Torbole	Anna Livbjerg (DEN)	Anna Munch (DEN)	Janika Puls (GER)
2017 Blanes	Anna Livbjerg (DEN)	Anna Munch (DEN)	Ascensión Roca (ESP)
2018 Kühlungsborn	Anna Livbjerg (DEN)	Ascensión Roca (ESP)	Stine Schreibe (GER)
2019 El Balis	Anna Livbjerg (DEN)	Ascensión Roca (ESP)	Elisabet Llargués (ESP)
2020 Råå	postponed to 2021 due to the COVID-19 pandemic		
2021 Råå	Anna Livbjerg (DEN)	Trine Bentzen (DEN)	Ascensión Roca (ESP)
2022 Douarnenez	Anna Livbjerg (DEN)	Julia Büsselberg (GER)	Ascensión Roca (ESP)

=== Continental Championships ===
==== European Championship Women's ====
Rank	Nation	Gold	Silver	Bronze	Total
1	Netherlands (NED)	4	1	1	6
2	Denmark (DEN)	3	3	0	6
3	Norway (NOR)	2	1	1	4
4	Finland (FIN)	1	3	0	4
5	Spain (ESP)	1	0	2	3
6	France (FRA)	0	1	1	2
6	Sweden (SWE)	0	1	1	2
8	Great Britain (GBR)	0	1	0	1
9	New Zealand (NZL)	0	0	3	3
10	Australia (AUS)	0	0	1	1
10	Germany (GER)	0	0	1	1
Totals (11 entries)		11	11	11	33

Event	Gold	Silver	Bronze
1991	Norway (NOR); Linda Andersen	Denmark (DEN); Dorte Jensen	France (FRA); Laurence Frementeau
1992	Denmark (DEN); Dorte Jensen	Sweden (SWE); Helena Brodin	Norway (NOR); Linda Andersen
1995 Malmö	Netherlands (NED); Margriet Matthijsse	Norway (NOR); Karolina Toll	Germany (GER); Nicola Schwarz
1997	Netherlands (NED); Margriet Matthijsse	Netherlands (NED); Carolijn Brouwer	Netherlands (NED); Marcelien de Koning
1999 Hayling Island	Netherlands (NED); Margriet Matthijsse	United Kingdom (GBR); Shirley Robertson	Australia (AUS); Sarah Blank
2000 Murcia	Netherlands (NED); Margriet Matthijsse	Finland (FIN); Sari Multala	New Zealand (NZL); Sarah Macky
2002 Nieuwpoort	Finland (FIN); Sari Multala	Denmark (DEN); Trine Julie Abrahamsen	New Zealand (NZL); Sarah Macky
2003 Palma de Mallorca	Norway (NOR); Siren Sundby	Finland (FIN); Sari Multala	New Zealand (NZL); Sarah Macky
2005 Helsinki	Denmark (DEN); Søren Johnsen	Finland (FIN); Sari Multala	Sweden (SWE); Sandra Sandqvist
2006 Marsala	Denmark (DEN); Sarah Gunni	France (FRA); Sandrine Maury	Spain (ESP); Roca de Togores Ascension
2007 L'Escala	Spain (ESP); Helen Montilla	Denmark (DEN); Anette Viborg Andersen	Spain (ESP); Eli Llargués Masachs

==== European Championship Men's ====
Rank	Nation	Gold	Silver	Bronze	Total
1	Denmark	3	0	1	4
2	Spain	1	1	3	5
3	Finland	1	0	0	1
4	Sweden	0	2	1	3
5	France	0	1	1	2
6	Germany	0	1	0	1
Totals (6 entries)		5	5	6	16

Rank	Nation	Gold	Silver	Bronze	Total
1	Denmark	3	0	1	4
2	Spain	1	1	3	5
3	Finland	1	0	0	1
4	Sweden	0	2	1	3
5	France	0	1	1	2
6	Germany	0	1	0	1
Totals (6 entries)		5	5	6	16

Event	Gold	Silver	Bronze
2002 Nieuwpoort	Denmark (DEN); Søren Johnsen	Sweden (SWE); Patrick Johansson	Sweden (SWE); Oscar Claeson
2003 Palma de Mallorca	Spain (ESP); Francisco Terrasa	Spain (ESP); Manuel Jiménez	Spain (ESP); Joan Salamé
2005 Helsinki	Finland (FIN); Teemu Rantanen	Sweden (SWE); Anton Dahlberg	Denmark (DEN); Lasse Juhl
2006 Marsala	Denmark (DEN); Jakob Ege Friis	Germany (GER); Jakob Ege Friis	Spain (ESP); Marc Paris
2007 L'Escala	Denmark (DEN); Christian Rindom	France (FRA); Jean-Christophe Gache	Spain (ESP); Gerard Marin

==== European Championship Open Master ====
Rank	Nation	Gold	Silver	Bronze	Total
1	France	3	6	7	16
2	Spain	3	2	1	6
3	Denmark	3	0	0	3
4	Belgium	2	2	2	6
5	Czech Republic	1	2	1	4
6	Germany	1	1	2	4
Totals (6 entries)		13	13	13	39

Event	Gold	Silver	Bronze
2000 Barcelona	Spain (ESP); Joseph Ramon Aragay	Spain (ESP); Helen Montilla	Belgium (BEL); Pieter van Laer
2001 Bad Saarow	France (FRA); Jean-Luc Labonne	Czech Republic (CZE); Eva Skorepova	France (FRA); Jean-Paul Terret
2002 Černá v Pošumaví	Belgium (BEL); Pieter van Laer	Germany (GER); OLaf Koppin	France (FRA); Jean-Luc Labonne
2003 Biscarosse	Germany (GER); Olaf Koppin	Czech Republic (CZE); Miroslav Cenet	France (FRA); Jean-Paul Terret
2004 Lake Neusiedl	Denmark (DEN); Søren Johnsen	Belgium (BEL); Pieter van Laer	Czech Republic (CZE); Vaclav Novotny
2005 Poznań	Denmark (DEN); Søren Johnsen	Belgium (BEL); Pieter van Laer	France (FRA); Séverine Blondet
2006 Skive	Denmark (DEN); Søren Johnsen	France (FRA); Séverine Blondet	Germany (GER); Anja Fiedler
2007 Girona	Spain (ESP); Helen Montilla	France (FRA); Séverine Blondet	Spain (ESP); Ariadna Herrándiz
2008 Quiberon	France (FRA); Jean-Luc Labonne	France (FRA); Séverine Blondet	France (FRA); Vincent Pham
2009 Cerfontaine	Belgium (BEL); Pieter van Laer	France (FRA); Jean-Luc Labonne	Germany (GER); Birgit Harder
2010 Lago di Garda	Czech Republic (CZE); Smesny Marek	France (FRA); Vincent Pham	France (FRA); Patrick Chevalier
2012 Lago di Garda	Spain (ESP); Carlos Masdevall Jr.	Spain (ESP); Hellen Montilla	Belgium (BEL); Pieter van Laer
2013 Brest	France (FRA); Perrine Darroux	France (FRA); Séverine Blondet	France (FRA); Jean Luc Labone

==== European Championship Women's Youth ====
Rank	Nation	Gold	Silver	Bronze	Total
1	Denmark	7	7	6	20
2	Sweden	2	1	4	7
3	Belgium	2	0	0	2
4	France	0	1	1	2
5	Finland	0	1	0	1
5	Netherlands	0	1	0	1
7	Germany	0	0	1	1
Totals (7 entries)		11	11	12	34

Event	Gold	Silver	Bronze
2003 Palma de Mallorca	Belgium (BEL); Marie Amandine Vande Ghirste	Netherlands (NED); Merel Witteveen	France (FRA); Mathilde Géron
2004 Vila Real de Santo António	Belgium (BEL); Marie Amandine Vande Ghinste	France (FRA); Mathilde Géron	Sweden (SWE); Sandra Sandquist
2005 Tønsberg	Denmark (DEN); Sarah Bregendahl	Denmark (DEN); Maiken Schuett	Germany (GER); Sarah Leinert
2006 L'Estartit	Denmark (DEN); Maiken Schuett	Denmark (DEN); Sarah Bregendahl	Denmark (DEN); Anna Livbjerg
2007 Biscarrosse	Denmark (DEN); Annette Viborg Andreasen	Denmark (DEN); Anne Livbjerg	Denmark (DEN); Anne-Marie Rindom
2008 Gravedona	Denmark (DEN); Anette Viborg Andreasen	Denmark (DEN); Anette-Julie Schuett	Sweden (SWE); Emma Oljelund
2009 Dénia	Denmark (DEN); Anne-Marie Rindom	Denmark (DEN); Annette Lundoe	Denmark (DEN); Anette-Julie Schuett
2010 Aarhus	Denmark (DEN); Anne-Line Lyngsø Thomsen	Denmark (DEN); Julie Foght Schytt	Sweden (SWE); Julia Gross
2011 Travemünde	Sweden (SWE); Julia Carlsson	Denmark (DEN); Christina Andersen	Sweden (SWE); Julia Gross
2012 Lago di Garda	Sweden (SWE); Anna Mikkelsen	Sweden (SWE); Julia Carlsson	Denmark (DEN); Anne-Line Lyngsen Thomsen
2013 Brest	Denmark (DEN); Trine Bentzen	Finland (FIN); Julia Toroi	Denmark (DEN); Kristine Marie Mauritzen

==== European Championship Men's Youth ====
Rank	Nation	Gold	Silver	Bronze	Total
1	Sweden	3	3	6	12
2	Denmark	3	3	3	9
3	France	2	0	0	2
4	Norway	1	3	1	5
5	Spain	1	2	1	4
6	Finland	1	0	0	1
Totals (6 entries)		11	11	11	33

Event	Gold	Silver	Bronze
2003 Palma de Mallorca	France (FRA); Mathieu Derand	Denmark (DEN); Kim Braad Carlsen	Sweden (SWE); Anton Dahlberg
2004 Vila Real de Santo António	France (FRA); Mathieu Derand	Sweden (SWE); Victor Vasternas	Sweden (SWE); Lucas Orn
2005 Tønsberg	Sweden (SWE); Victor Bergström	Norway (NOR); Stian Tuv	Sweden (SWE); Filip Bolmgren
2006 L'Estartit	Denmark (DEN); Mads Bendix	Sweden (SWE); Victor Bergström	Denmark (DEN); Thomas Tang
2007 Biscarrosse	Finland (FIN); Teemu Rantanen	Spain (ESP); Marc Terrasa	Denmark (DEN); Michael Hansen
2008 Gravedona	Denmark (DEN); Pascal TImshel	Denmark (DEN); Martin Frurgaard	Sweden (SWE); Philip Carlson
2009 Dénia	Denmark (DEN); Stig Steinfurth	Norway (NOR); Kristian Hammarstroem	Spain (ESP); Juan Calvo
2010 Aarhus	Spain (ESP); Albert Codinachs	Spain (ESP); Juan Calvo	Sweden (SWE); Hampus Appelgren
2011 Travemünde	Sweden (SWE); Emil Bengtson	Sweden (SWE); Marcus Höglander	Sweden (SWE); Albin Gipperth
2012 Lago di Garda	Sweden (SWE); Marcus Höglander	Norway (NOR); Nicholas Fadler Martinsen	Denmark (DEN); Tobias Hemdorff
2013 Brest	Norway (NOR); Lars Johan Brodkorb	Denmark (DEN); Frederick Rask	Norway (NOR); Håvard Katle Fjon

=== Vintage Yachting Games ===
==== Women's ====
Rank	Nation	Gold	Silver	Bronze	Total
1	Germany	2	0	0	2
2	Denmark	0	1	1	2
3	Italy	0	1	0	1
4	Spain	0	0	1	1
Totals (4 entries)		2	2	2	6

Event	Gold	Silver	Bronze
2008 Medemblik	Germany (GER); Svenja Puls	Italy (ITA); Silvia Zennaro	Spain (ESP); Elisabet Llargués
2012 Lake Como	Germany (GER); Janika Puls	Denmark (DEN); Anne-Line Lybgsø Thomsen	Denmark (DEN); Anna Livbjerg
2016 Weymouth Bay			

==== Men's ====
Rank	Nation	Gold	Silver	Bronze	Total
1	Denmark	1	0	1	2
2	France	1	0	0	1
3	Germany	0	1	1	2
4	Spain	0	1	0	1
Totals (4 entries)		2	2	2	6

Event	Gold	Silver	Bronze
2008 Medemblik	France (FRA); Thomas Ribeaud	Spain (ESP); Marc Paris Gilbert	Germany (GER); Arne Berg
2012 Lake Como	Denmark (DEN); Frederik Rask	Germany (GER); Sverre Reinke	Denmark (DEN); Jacob Cholewa
2016 Weymouth Bay			

== See also ==
- Europe World Championships
