= Frans Bolweg =

Dutch sailor

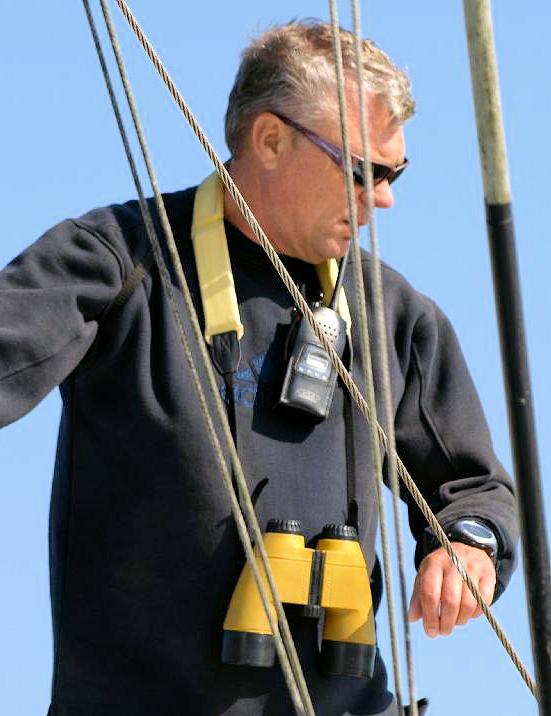
- Frans Bolweg in 'full flight' as Race Officer during the 2008 Vintage Yachting Games in Medemblik.

Personal information
- Nationality: Dutch
- Born: 30 March 1950 Amsterdam, Netherlands
- Died: 10 January 2015 (aged 64) Monnickendam, Netherlands
- Height: 1.90 m (6.2 ft)

Sport

Sailing career
- Class(es): Clipper; Europe; Laser
- Club: Surf, Zeil en Watersportvereniging Uitdam
- Updated on 2015-01-10

Frans Bolweg (30 March 1950 – 10 January 2015) was a sailor, scout, speaker, National Race Officer and since 1995 International Judge from the Netherlands.

== Sailing life ==
Frans Bolweg had a short career, in Clipper, Europe and Laser, as regatta sailor however developed himself into a race organizer 'pur sang'. After a management crisis in 1983 at the 'Watersportvereniging Monnickendam', Bolweg among others like Henri van der Lubbe and Kees Kooij took the initiative for the 'Surf, Zeil en Watersportvereniging Uitdam'. The goal for this yacht club is to focus on new developments in the sport of sailing. At first this yacht club gave one of the first platforms in the Netherlands for International Windsurf competitions on open water.

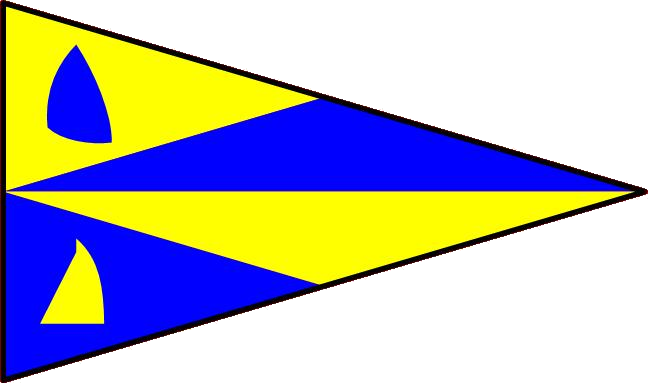
Burgee of the Surf, Zeil en Watersport Vereniging Uitdam

Later, Bolweg was the leading race officer in the first Match race event during the 1989 SPA Regatta at Medemblik as well as many other sailing events in the Netherlands. Also the new development to introduce a new event for the former Olympic classes drew Bolweg's interest. He was race officer during the 2008 edition of the Vintage Yachting Games and International judge during the 2012 edition in Bellano (ITA).

Bolweg was also during many sailing events 'the voice' of the event. On countless events, like the former SPA Regatta, Delta LLoyd regatta and the team sailing competition at the Maashaven in Rotterdam he worked as the speaker to inform the audience in an entertaining and professional way.

== Personal life ==
Born in Amsterdam as third son of Maximilianus Wilhelmus Bolweg and Annetta Geertruida Maria Bolweg (née Nefkens). His mother, herself an experienced regatta sailor in the 12 foot dinghy, taught him how to sail. Bolweg moved in his early childhood to Laren, where he received his education. His father, who was working in the grocery business, tried to interest Bolweg for a study and career in that line of business as well. Since Bolweg had the ambition to go to drama school this made him leave the elderly house and find his own way in life.

For over twenty years, during the European winter season, Bolweg went for study and meditation to Buddhist monasteries in Thailand.

On the age of 25 Bolweg developed a cancer in his left eye. After regression of this cancer he kept a 'seaman like' appearance. In 2014 cancer returned in his organs, this time without hope.

Bolweg lived on the patrol boat "Jade" in Monnickendam.

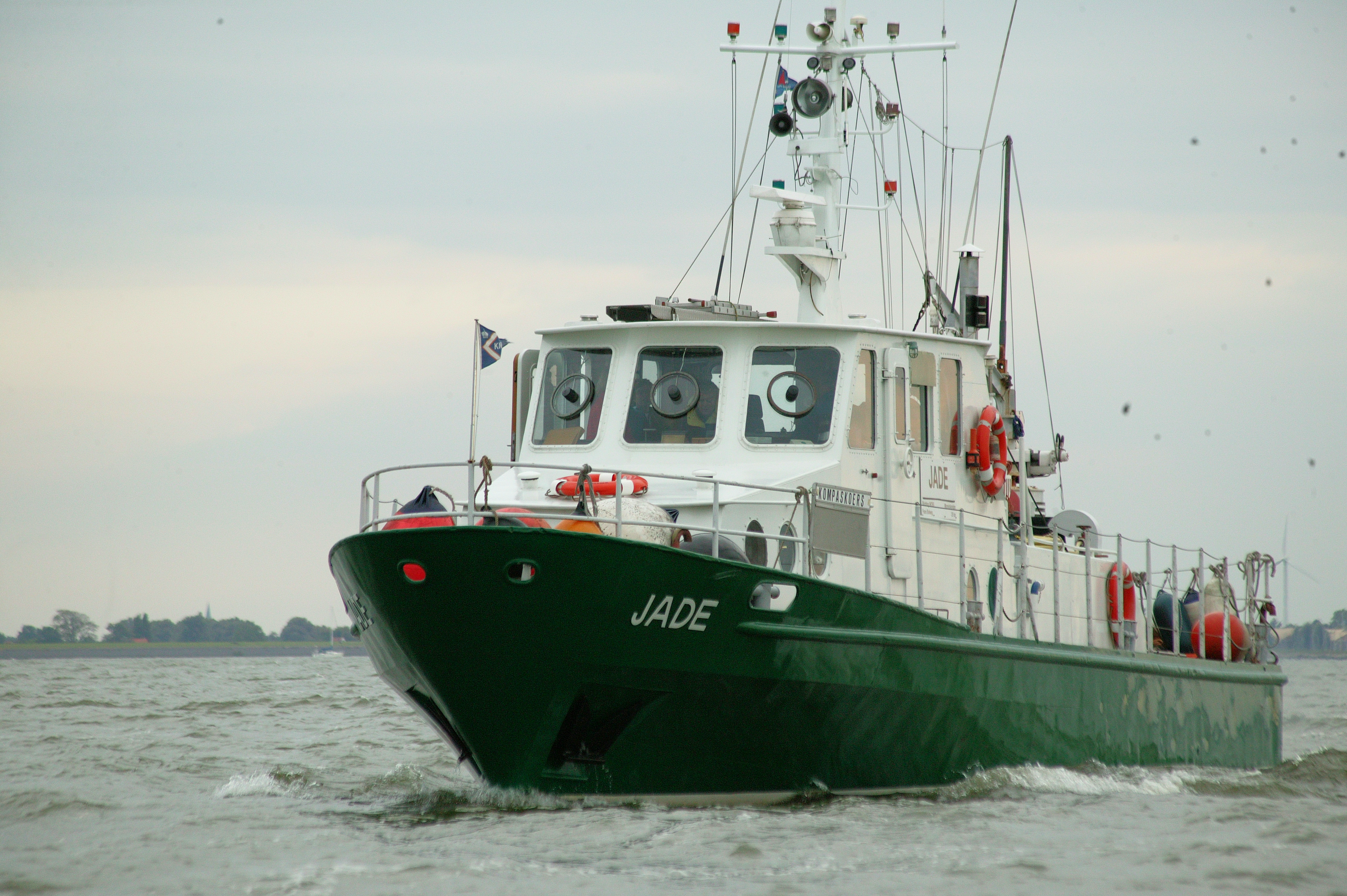
The Jade. As starting Vessel during the 2008 Vintage Yachting Games
