= Christopher Gundersen =

Norwegian sailor

Personal information
- Full name: Christopher Maxo Guldahl Gundersen
- Born: 16 October 1983 (age 42) Oslo, Norway
- Height: 180 cm (5 ft 11 in)
- Spouse: Siren Sundby

Sailing career
- Sport: Sailing
- Club: Vestfjordens Seilforening
- Class(es): Europe, 49er
Medal record
Sailing
Representing Norway
World Championships
| Gold medal – first place | 2004 Cagliari | Europe |
| Bronze medal – third place | 2003 Cádiz | Europe |

Christopher Maxo Guldahl Gundersen (born 16 October 1983) is a Norwegian sailor and world champion.

He received a gold medal in the Europe class at the 2004 World Championships. Gundersen lives permanently in Oslo, together with his wife, the former sailor Siren Sundby. He studied medicine at the University of Oslo.

He competed in the 49er class at the 2008 Summer Olympics in Beijing.
