= Martin Andersson (sailor) =

Swedish sailor (born 1969)

Jan Martin Andersson (born 22 July 1969) is a Swedish Olympic sailor. He finished 4th in the 470 event at the 2004 Summer Olympics together with Johan Molund.
