= Sarah Macky =

New Zealand sailor

Personal information
- Full name: Sarah Anne Macky
- Nationality: New Zealand
- Born: 13 January 1980 (age 46) Auckland, New Zealand
- Height: 1.76 m (5 ft 9 1/2 in)
- Weight: 68 kg (150 lb)

Sailing career
- Sport: Sailing
- Club: Kohimarama Yacht Club
- Coached by: Leslie Egnot
- Class: Dinghy

Sarah Anne Macky (born 13 January 1980) is a New Zealand former sailor, who specialized in the Europe class. She scored top ten finishes on her signature boat in two editions of the Olympic Games (2000 and 2004), and also trained throughout most of her sailing career for Kohimarama Yacht Club, under the tutelage of her coach and former Olympian Leslie Egnot.

Macky made her first New Zealand team at the 2000 Summer Olympics in Sydney, finishing ninth in the Europe class with a net grade of 79.

At the 2004 Summer Olympics in Athens, Macky was nominated to the New Zealand sailing squad for the second time to compete in the Europe class by placing sixth and obtaining a berth from the 2003 ISAF World Championships in Cadiz, Spain. There, she improved upon her ninth-place feat from the previous Games to climb slightly in eighth position at the end of eleven-race series, collecting a net total of 91 points.
