= 2008 Vintage Yachting Games =

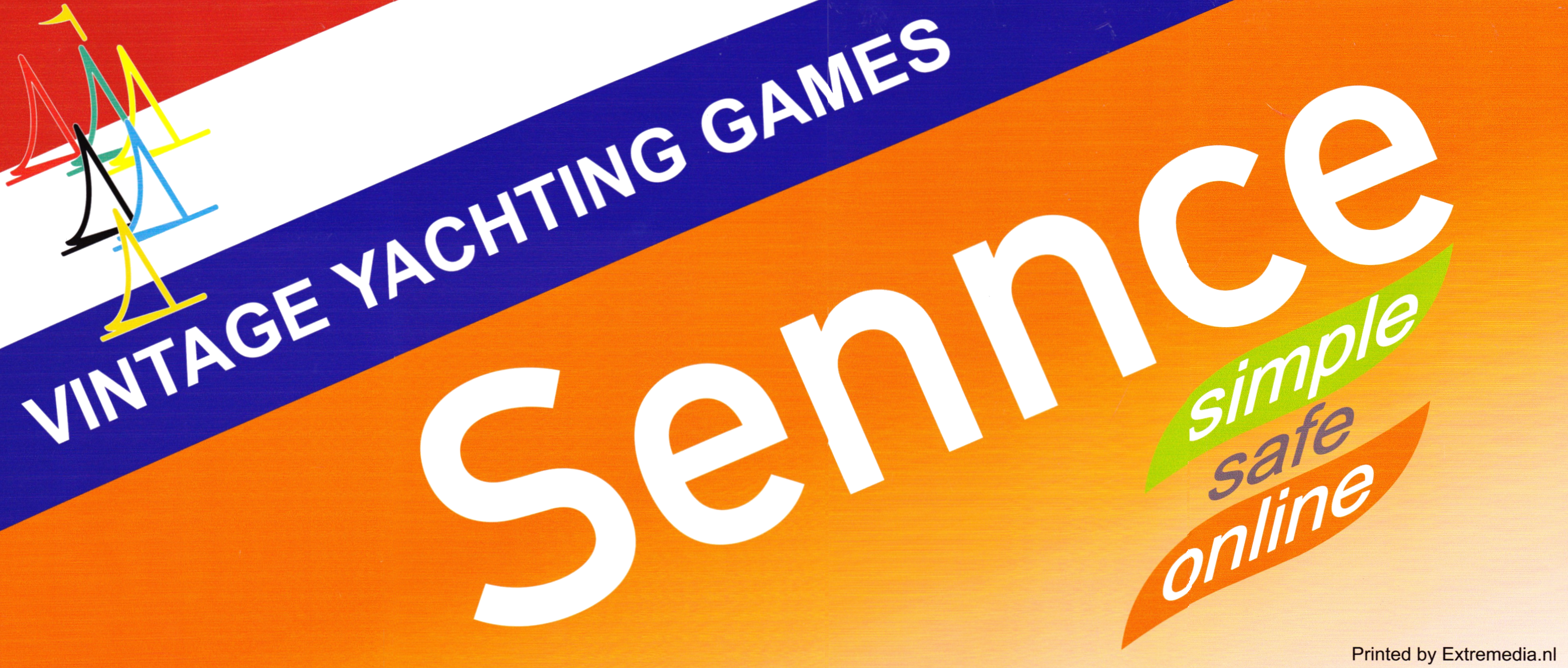
- Bowsticker used at the 1st Vintage Yachting Games

Event title
- Edition: 1st
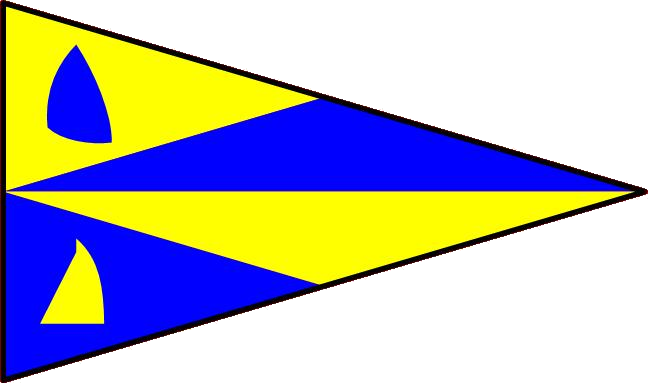
- Host: SZ & WV Uitdam

Event details
- Venue: IJsselmeer; Netherlands
- Dates: 20–27 September 2008
- Yachts: 66
- Key people: * Chairman: (Netherlands) Rudy den Outer: Secretary: (Netherlands) Nancy Schoof; Treasurer: (Germany) Sebastiaan Hopf
- Opened by: Mayor of Medemblik (Netherlands) Theo van Eijk

Competitors
- Competitors: 128
- Competing nations: 20

Results
- (gold) Gold: Netherlands
- (silver) Silver: Germany
- (bronze) Bronze: Wildcards
- Vintage InterPares: Szabolcs Majthényi; Hungary

Classes
- Dinghies: Europe, Europe, O-Jolle, Flying Dutchman
- Keelboats: Soling, Dragon
- VIP race: 12' Dinghy

The 2008 Vintage Yachting Games was the first post-Olympic multi-class sailing event for discontinued Olympic classes. The event took place on the IJsselmeer near Medemblik, Netherlands, from 20 September to 27 September 2008. A total of 66 sailors in 47 boats from 17 countries showed up to compete in six Vintage Yachting Classes

== Prologue ==
=== Bid process ===
Since the idea of the Vintage Yachting Games originated from the Netherlands and also the key project team members were living there, it was an easy step to organize this event the first time nearby. So there was no formal bid process. The city of Medemblik is since the early 1960s the main capital of the Dutch Olympic sailing community. The IJsselmeer of the coast of Medemblik offers mostly fair conditions for racing. The Royal Yacht Club Hollandia, the primary race organizer in Medemblik, however turned down the request of the Vintage Yachting Games Organization to act as the host club. A perfect alternative was found in the experienced Surf, Zeil & Watersportvereniging Uitdam and one of its founders Frans Bolweg. With Uitdam the Vintage Yachting Games Organization was ensured form a very professional host club with also many years of experience at the waters near the Medemblik coast. Uitdam co-organized for many years the successful Spa Regatta (currently Holland-regatta or Delta Lloyd Regatta).

=== Kick-off and preparation ===
In order to realize the first edition of the Vintage Yachting Games in time and with the proper quality, a project team was put together with competence in areas. Besides the Vintage Yachting Games Organizations board, the project team consisted of Frouk Segaar (Race management), Lydia Verduyn (Fundraising), Peter Hoekstra, Mireille Zeeman and Martijn van der Driest (Ceremonies), Menno Meyer (Jury), Robin Segaar (Measurement) and Frans Bolweg (Host club).

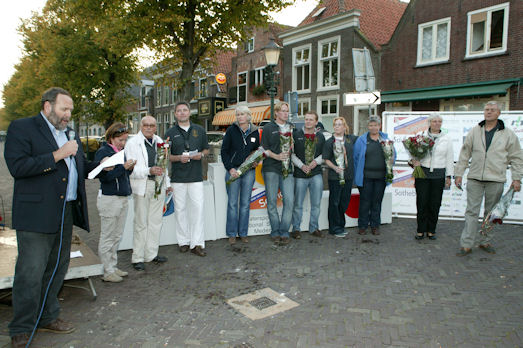
Organizing Committee 2008 Vintage Yachting Games

The two main issues of the project team was confronted with were:

- Getting the idea across to the class organizations and sailors
- Fundraising, which turned out to be a very hard task

Both issues were emphasized by the fact that this was the first time ever of such an event. Finally issues were resolved in time by the project team so that the quality of the event was according to the required level.

=== Costs ===
The financial strategy of the project team was that it must be able to organize a minimum event with high quality and finance it with the income of the entry fees. Funds and materials from sponsoring would be used to add quality elements to the event so that the sailors would get more value for money and the sponsors had more exposure a shore.

The total cost of the event was approximately €40.000. Because at the last moment there was quite a significant number of no-shows, the project team successfully adjusted the purchase of social events, and some sponsors contributed extra so that the financial aspect of the event stayed (just) in the black.

== Vintage ==
=== Organization ===
		Event management
		Nancy Schoof (Netherlands); Sebastian Hopf (Germany)
	Principal race officer	Chief measurer	Chairman of the jury
	Frouk Segaar (Netherlands)	John Best (United Kingdom)	David Chivers (United Kingdom)
Race officer yellow area	Race officer orange area	Measurer	Members of the jury
Michiel Pouli (Netherlands)	Frans Bolweg (Netherlands)	Niki Nocke (Germany)	Menno Meyer (Netherlands)	Benno Loske (Germany)	Huib Ozinga (Netherlands)	Freddy Vergauwe (Belgium)	Cees Kurpershoek (Netherlands)

=== Venues ===
Medemblik
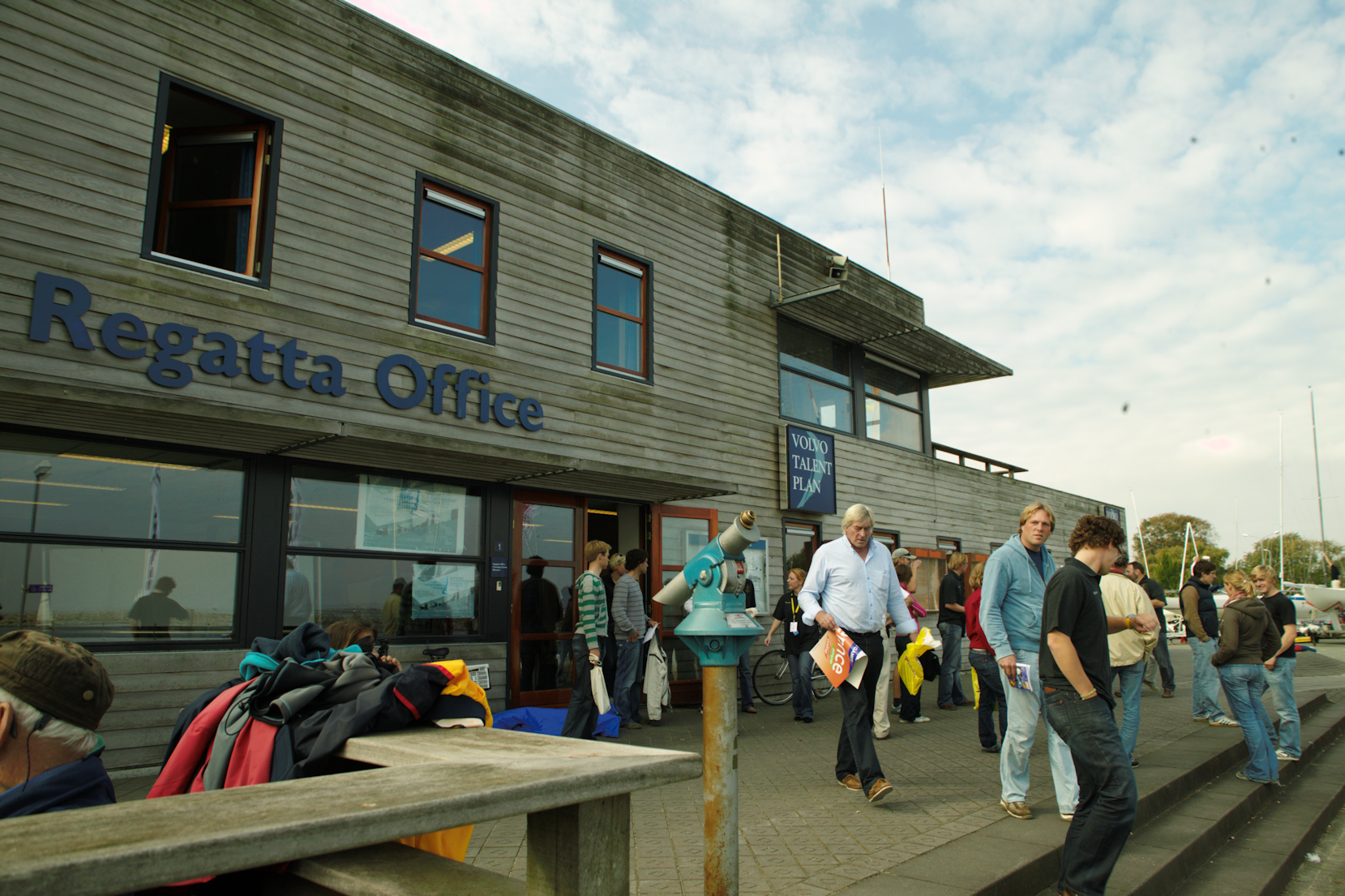
- Regatta Center Medemblik

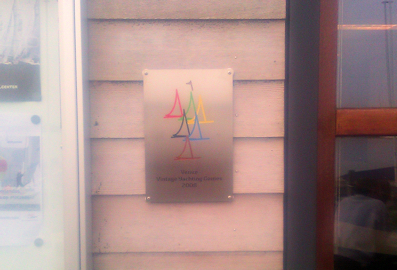
- Memory plaque at the Regatta Center
- Coordinates: 52°46′18″N 5°7′4″E
- Country: Netherlands
- Province: North Holland
- Time zone: UTC+1 (CET)
  - Summer (DST): UTC+2 (CEST)
- Website: http://www.medemblik.nl

The Regatta Center in Medemblik offers suitable logistic and facilities for the organization of large International sailing events. The waters in front of the Regatta Center are capable for laying out several course areas. For the 2008 Vintage Yachting Games two course areas were used to cater for the Vintage Yachting Classes.

=== Wind conditions ===
The Netherlands in general and the northern part of the IJsselmeer in special has a typical sea climate. The wind is typically gradient driven. In the summer when there is a low tide in the afternoon on the Wadden Sea a sea breeze can develop from the north off the coast of Medemblik.

In September the temperature can vary from 10 to 30 °C. Occasionally a thunderstorm can develop in the afternoon or evening.

=== Calendar ===
The program of the 2008 Vintage Yachting Games was as follows:

Date	Main activity	Social events
20 September (Saturday)	* Registration * Measurement	
21 September (Sunday)	* Registration * Measurement	Opening ceremony * Fleet review * Opening at the castle Radboud * Social event at the castle
22 September (Monday)	Race 1	Daily prize giving
23 September (Tuesday)	* Race 2 * Race 3	Daily prize giving
24 September (Wednesday)	Race 4	* Daily prize giving * Mid-week social event
25 September (Thursday)	Race 5	Daily prize giving
26 September (Friday)	Race 6	Daily prize giving
27 September (Saturday)	Race 7	Closing ceremony * VIP race (12’ Dinghy) * Prize giving * Passing of the flag * Championship dinner

=== Competition ===
Continents	Countries	Classes	Boats	Sailors
4	20	6	66	128

Sailors at the 2008 Vintage Yachting Games
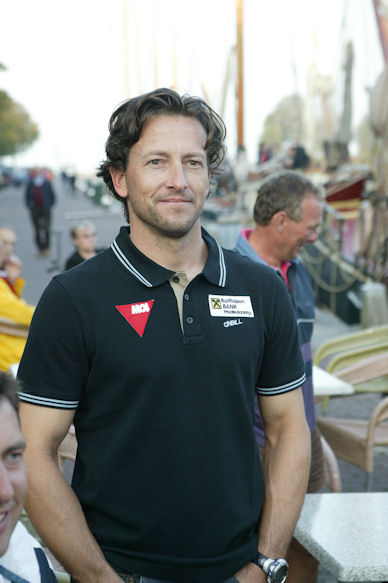
In Flying Dutchman:
Szabolcs Majthenyi

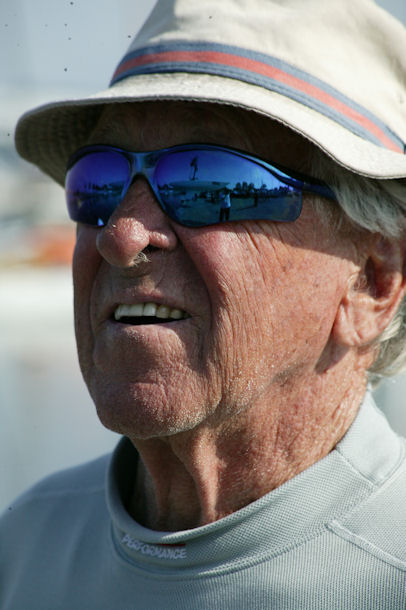
In Dragon:
Gordon Ingate

In Dragon:
Keith Musto
- Szabolcs Majthenyi: Multiple World Champion Flying Dutchman
- Gordon Ingate: Olympic participant 1972 in Tempest, long time involved in America's Cup sailing for Australia. Oldest participant during the 2008 Vintage (82)
- Keith Musto: Olympic silver medalist 1964 in Flying Dutchman

=== Continents ===
- Australia
- Europe
- North America
- South America

=== Countries ===
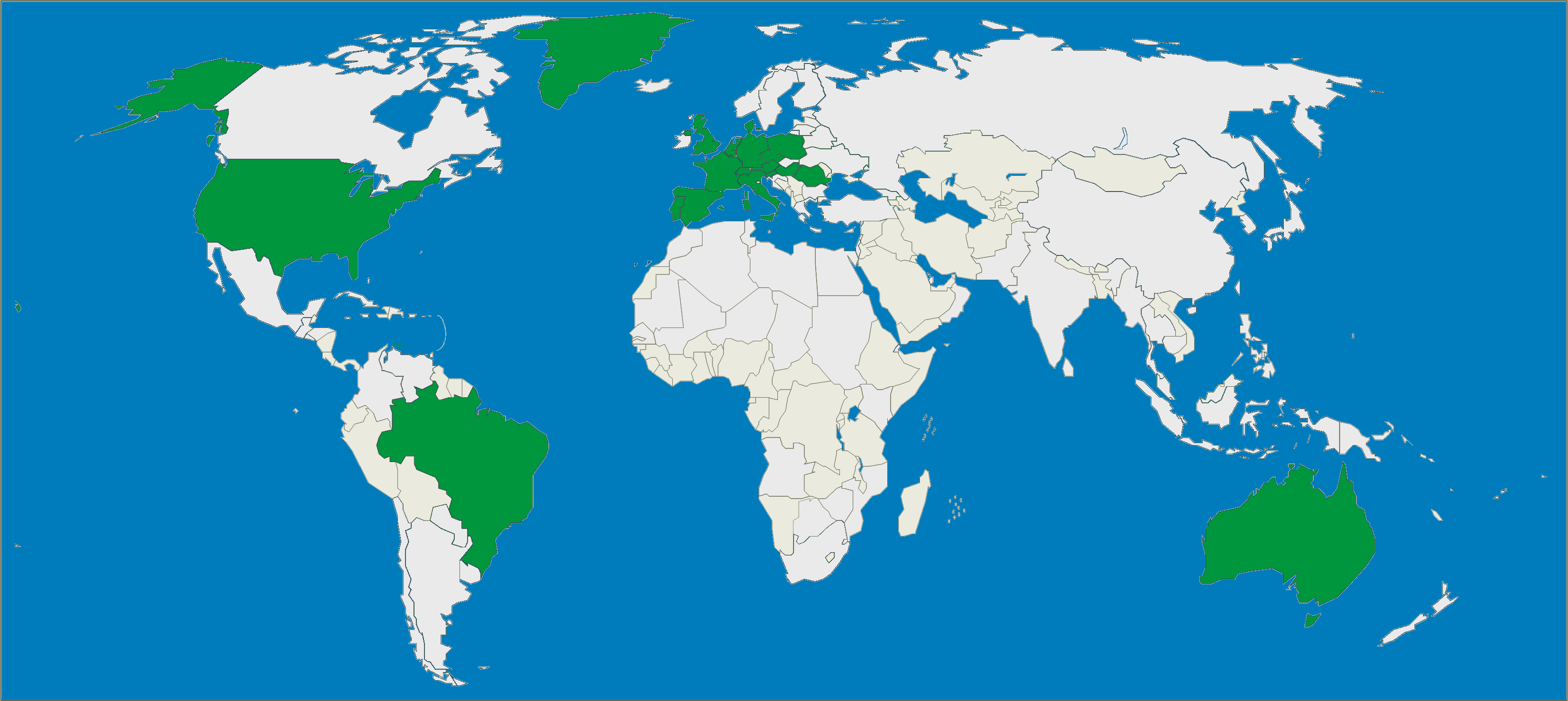
Countries that participated in the 2008 Vintage Yachting Games. Blue: Water Gray: Never participated in the Vintage Yellow: Participated in earlier Vintages Green: Country participated in her first Vintage Gold: Country participated also on previous Vintages

Netherlands Antilles	Austria	Australia
Belgium	Brazil	Czech Republic
Denmark	Spain	France
United Kingdom	Germany	Hungary
Italy	Netherlands	Poland
Portugal	Romania	Slovenia
Switzerland	United States

=== Vintage Yachting Classes ===
Class	Type	Event	Sailors	Trapeze	Mainsail	Jib/Genoa	Spinnaker	First Vintage	Vintages	Boats
Europe (Female)	Dinghy		1	0	+	-	-	2008	1	11
Europe (Male)	Dinghy		1	0	+	-	-	2008	1	11
12 foot dinghy	Dinghy	Vintage InterPares Race	1	0	+	-	-	2008	1	8
O-Jolle	Dinghy		1	0	+	-	-	2008	1	20
Flying Dutchman	Dinghy		1	1	+	+	+	2008	2	14
Soling	Keelboat		3	0	+	+	+	2008	1	13
Dragon (keelboat)	Keelboat		3	0	+	+	+	2008	1	13

Vintage Yachting Classes active during the 2008 Vintage Yachting Games
Pictures of the Active Vintage Yachting Classes 2008 at the IJsselmeer
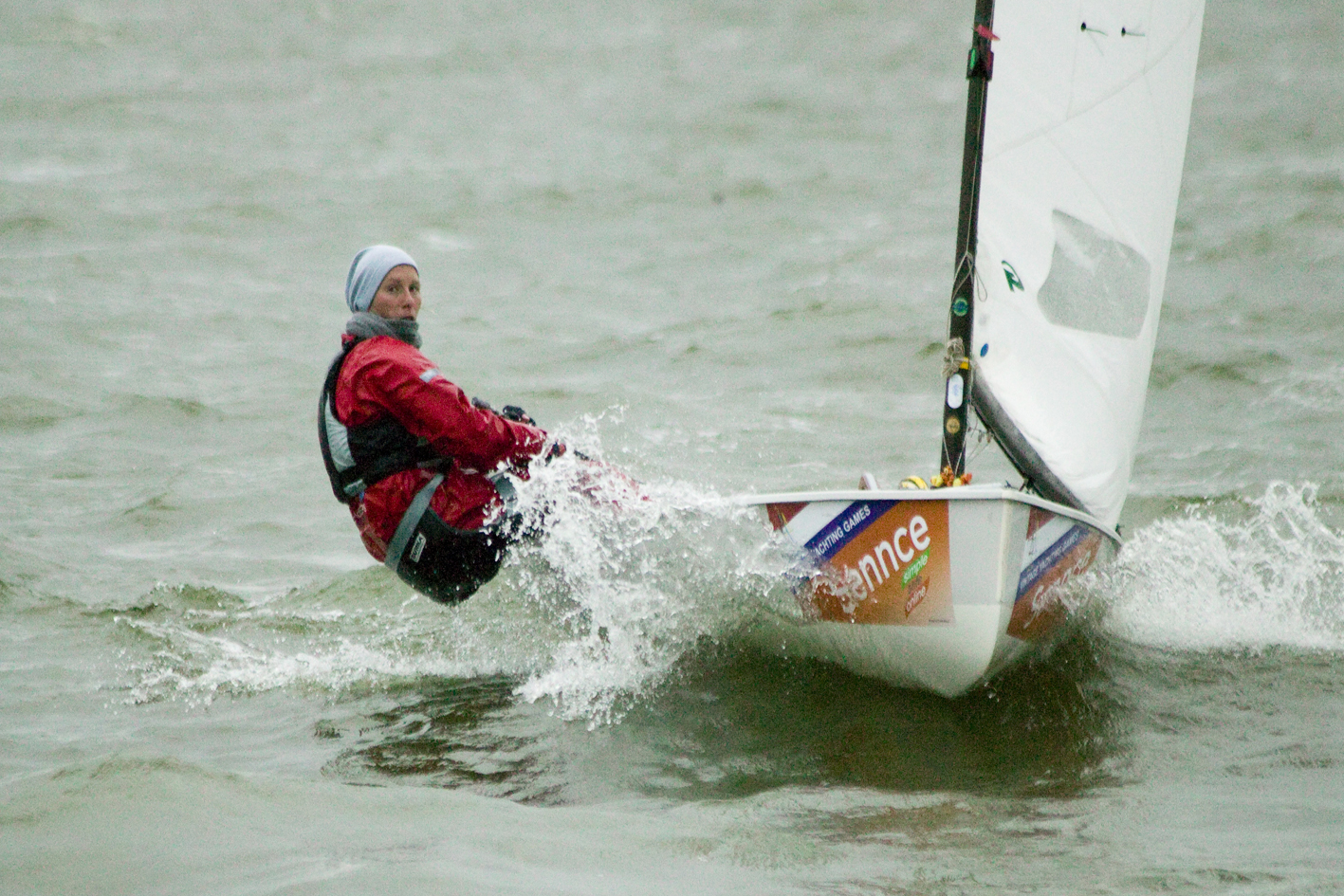
Europe

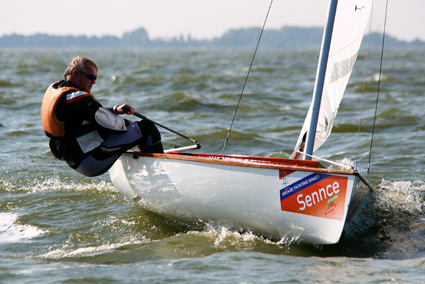
O-Jolle

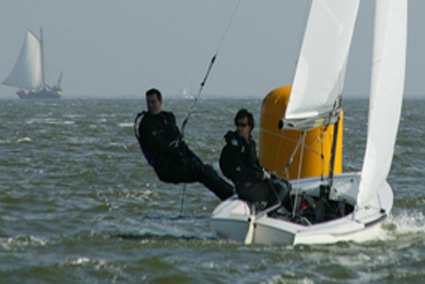
Flying Dutchman

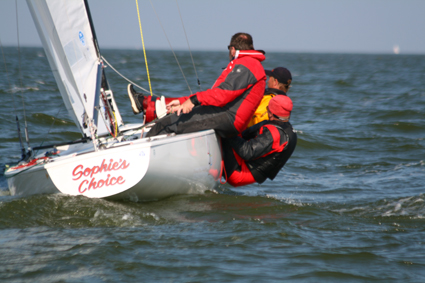
Soling

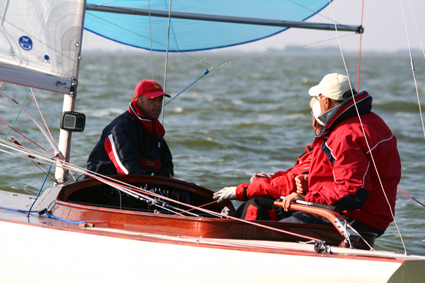
Dragon

=== Measurement ===
Measurement during the Vintage Yachting Games was limited to safety equipment of the competing boats. The boats Flying Dutchman and Europe class were weighed and checked. The remaining sails, rigging and boats were just "stamped". No major measurement issues were found.

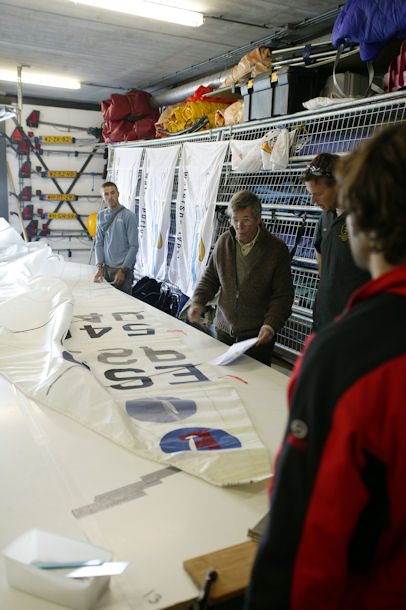
Niki Nocke mearuring at the 2008 Vintage Yachting Games

=== Opening ceremony ===
The opening ceremony consisted of the following elements:

- Fleet review: During the part the mayor of Medemblik acted as fleet admiral. In that role he judged the execution of the manoeuvers of the fleets of Vintage Yachting classes. The 8 Metre Varg was use as the admirals flagship
- Parade: The sailors walked their flags from the Regatta centre to the medieval castle Radboud.
- Official opening: After the opening speeches and a short video clip of each of the Vintage Yachting Classes in their Olympic days, the mayor declared the Vintage Yachting Games 2008 opened
- Social event: Finally the sailors and organizers enjoyed the dinner in the castle
Opening of the 2008 Vintage Yachting Games
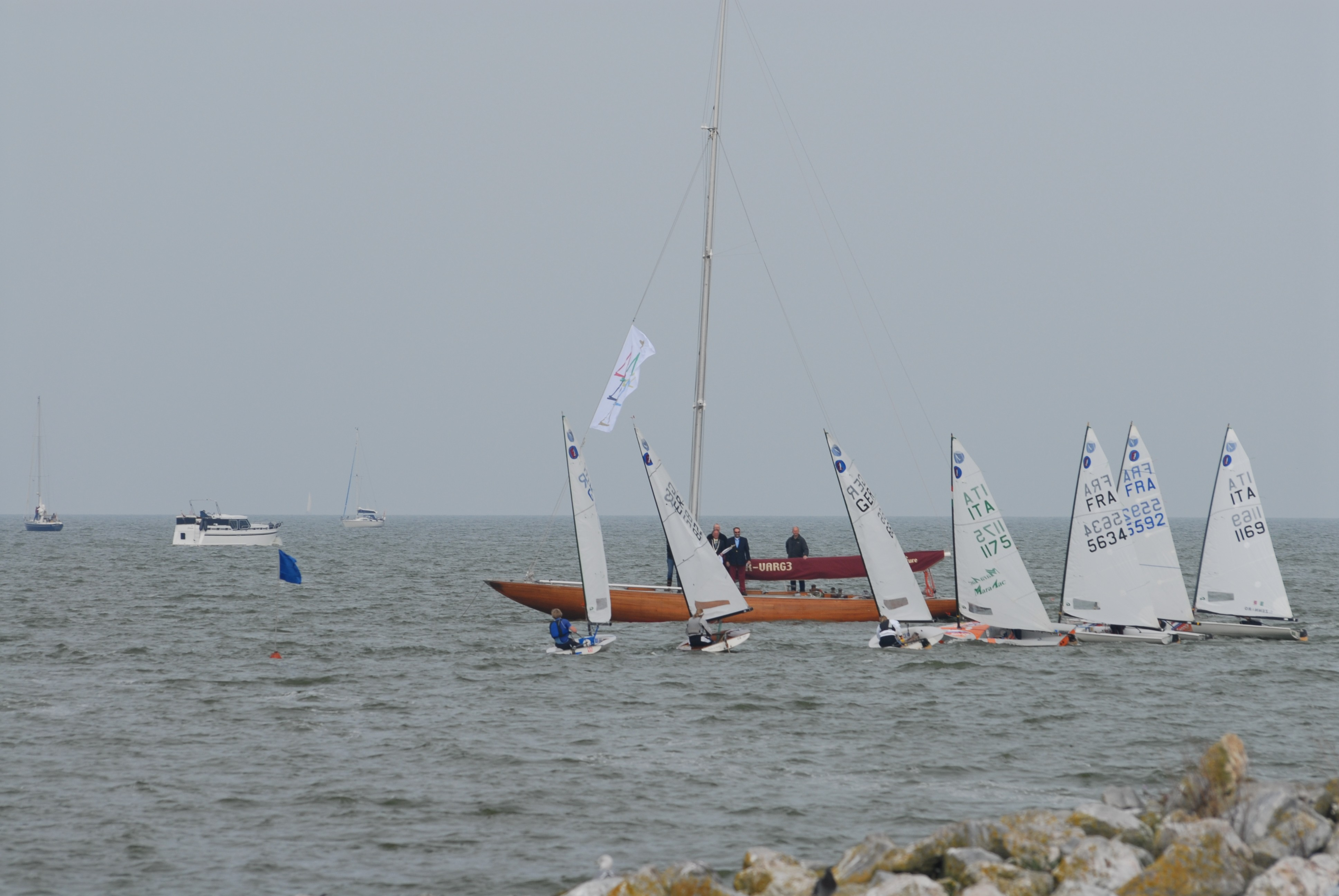

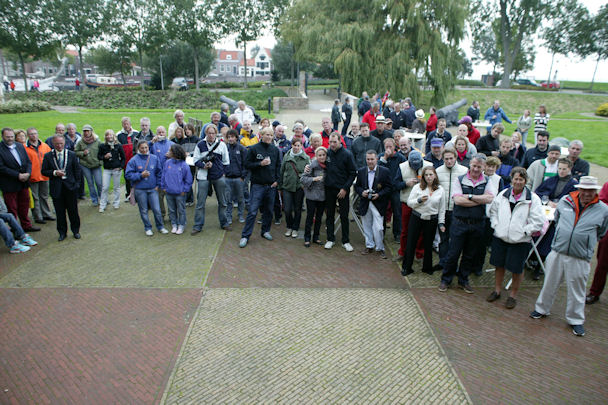
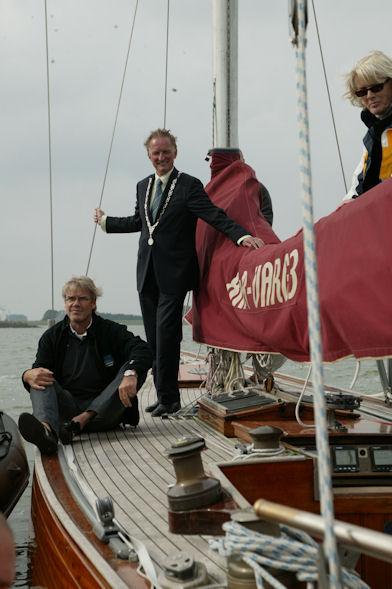
8 Metre "Varg" acting as the vessel of the Admiral.

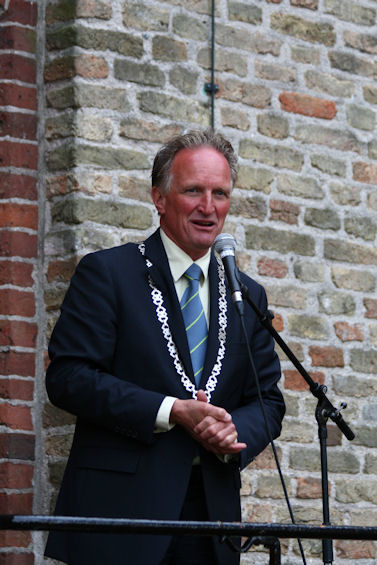
Theo van Eijk opening the Vintage

=== Closing ceremony ===
The closing ceremony started with the Vintage InterPares race in the 12’ Dinghies. This was followed by the prize giving. The prizes were handed out by the representatives of the International Class Organizations. During the closing of the event Rudy den Outer thanked the city of Medemblik for her cooperation. He also announced that “Multilario”, will be the host of the 2012 Vintage Yachting Games. After that the Vintage flag was received from the mayor of Medemblik, Theo van Eijk by the Project manager of the 2012 Edition of the Vintage Yachting Games: Pietro Adamoli. This next edition will be organized at Lake Como.

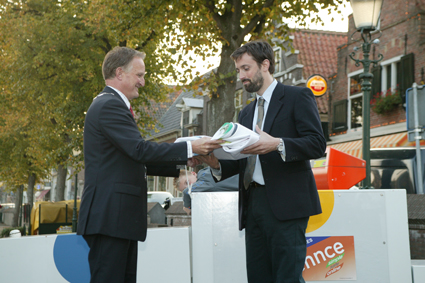
The Vintage Flag was transferred from Theo van Eijk (Mayor of Medemblik) to Pietro Adamoli representing the Multilario organization, the 2012 host.

=== Media coverage ===
The official photographer of the 2008 Vintage Yachting Games was Marc van Oers.

The event was covered by the media in several ways:

- National TV 'SBS6' (NED)
- National newspaper 'Telegraaf' (NED)
- Local newspaper 'Noord-Hollands Dagblad'
- The Dutch sailing Magazine 'Zeilen'
- Several International internet sites for yachting
- Web page International Sailing Federation ISAF
- Web pages International Class Organizations (Vintage Classes)
  - Europe
  - O-Jolle
  - Flying Dutchman
  - Soling
  - Dragon
- Web pages several national Class organizations (Vintage Olympic Classes)

== Sailing ==
Races in all events were sailed in a fleet racing format of seven scheduled races. The contestants raced around a course in one group, and each boat earned a score equal conform the bonus point system. The five best scores for each boat were summed up for the overall score. On Saturday 27 September the wind conditions did not allowed a valid race.

=== Reports per event ===
Per class separate pages reporting the facts are available (see the details section per class in the medals table).

=== Report Vintage InterPares race ===
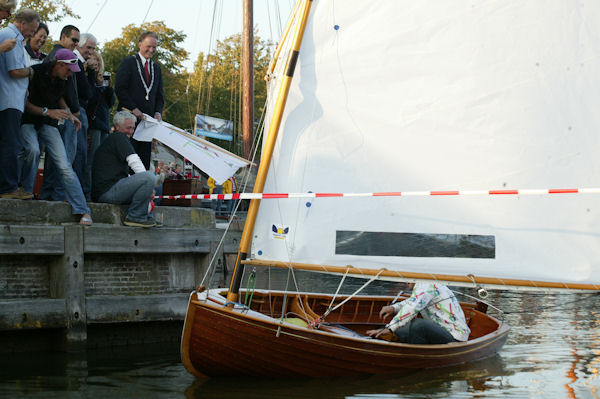
Victor of the Vintage InterPares Race: Szabolcs Majthenyi, representing The International Flying Dutchman

By crossing colored ribbon Szabolcs Majthenyi, the responsible person of the victorious Hungarian Flying Dutchman, won the Vintage InterPares race 2008. In this race all winners of the Vintage Yachting Games meet each other in a battle between the classes. This race is held in the 12’ Dinghy, an Olympic class in 1920 and 1928. This class is still very active in 10 countries including The Netherlands, Italy and Japan. For privacy reasons the rest of the finishing order will remain a secret. The International Flying Dutchman class was “THE” Vintage Yachting Class till 2012.

== Medal summary ==
=== Medals ===
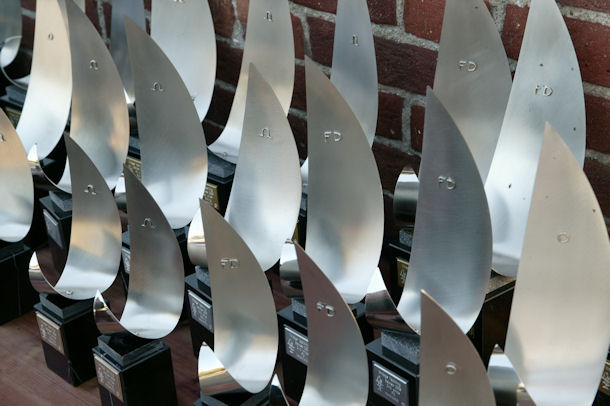
Trophies of the 2008 Vintage Yachting Games

Event	Gold	Silver	Bronze
Europe Female:	Germany; Svenja Puls	Italy; Silvia Zennaro	Spain; Elisabet Llargués
Europe Male	France; Thomas Ribeaud	Spain; Marc Paris Gilbert	Germany; Arne Berg
O-Jolle:	Netherlands; Max Blom	Netherlands; Herman van Eijk	Netherlands; Jan Krom
Flying Dutchman:	Hungary; Szabolcs Majthenyi; András Domokos	Germany; Kilian Koenig; Johannes Brack	Germany; Kai Schäfers; Marcus Landgrebe
Soling:	Netherlands; Rudy den Outer; Leo Determan; Ronald den Arend	Wildcard; Steven Bakker; Sven Coster; Joost Houweling	Germany; Holger Weichert; Laurent Scheel; Martin Setzkorn
Dragon:	Netherlands; Reinier Wissenraet; Gijs Evers; Marc Reijnhoudt	United Kingdom; Gavia Wilkinson-Cox; Ron Rosenberg; Jon Mortimer	Australia; Gordon Ingate; David Giles; Keith Musto

=== Vintage 2008 ===
Rank	Nation	Gold	Silver	Bronze	Total
1	Netherlands (NED)	3	1	1	5
2	Germany (GER)	1	1	3	5
3	France (FRA)	1	0	0	1
3	Hungary (HUN)	1	0	0	1
5	Spain (ESP)	0	1	1	2
6	Great Britain (GBR)	0	1	0	1
6	Italy (ITA)	0	1	0	1
6	Wildcards	0	1	0	1
9	Australia (AUS)	0	0	1	1
Totals (9 entries)		6	6	6	18

=== Country Trophy ===
Rank	Class (Entries)	Europe (Female) (10)		Europe (Male) (9)		O-Jolle (9)		Flying Dutchman (17)		Soling (12)		Dragon (12)		Total points
Rank	Country	Rank	Points	Rank	Points	Rank	Points	Rank	Points	Rank	Points	Rank	Points	Total points
1	Netherlands	10	101			1	1055	6	553	1	1080	1	1080	3869
2	Germany	7	256	4	453			2	1030	3	703			2442
3	Wildcards	8	198			5	356	11	290	2	703	5	481	2028
4	Italy	2	800	4	453			9	377					1630
5	France	4	499	1	1055									1554
6	Spain	3	624	2	754									1378
7	Hungary							1	1331					1331
8	United Kingdom									6	403	2	879	1281
9	Netherlands Antilles							4	729					739
10	Australia											2	703	703
11	Austria							5	632					632
12	United States									5	481			481
13	Switzerland	9	198			6	277							475
14	Poland											6	402	402
15	Czech Republic							10	331					331
16	Romania							12	252					252

== Concerns ==
- The major concern for the sailors as well as the organizers and sponsors wat that 19 teams cancelled, for a variety of reasons, less than 48 hours before the opening, or simply did not came. The organization decided that those teams would show in the results.
- Only moments after his arrival at Medemblik, the O-Jolle of Felix Hurter was stolen from the parkinglot
  of the regatta center. Felix was able to race due to the help of the Dutch O-Jolle class organization and Hendrik van Isselmuiden who lent out his O-Jolle.
