= Meg Gaillard =

American yacht racer

Personal information
- Full name: Mary Ellen Gaillard
- Born: August 8, 1973 (age 52) Huntington, New York, United States

Sailing career
- Sport: Sailing
- College team: Connecticut College
- Class: Europe
Medal record
Women's sailing
Representing United States
World Championships
Bronze medal – third place	2000 Salvador da Bahia	Europe
Bronze medal – third place	2003 Cádiz	Europe

Mary Ellen Gaillard (born August 8, 1973) is an American competitive sailor who competed in the 2004 Summer Olympics.

== Sailing career ==
Gaillard was born in Huntington, New York. During her youth, she sailed Optimist dinghy and with the family's Etchells. She attended Connecticut College, graduating in 1995, where she also represented the school's sailing and soccer teams.

Meg Gaillard won the bronze medal at the 2000 Europe World Championships in Brazil. She was then runner-up in the 2000 US Olympic trials for the Europe event and missed the cut. Gaillard won another bronze medal in the Eurepoe class at the 2003 ISAF Sailing World Championships. For the next Olympics, she qualified for the Olympic Europe event. At the 2004 Summer Olympics, Gaillard finished 14th.

== Personal life ==
Meg Gaillard is the daughter of Ann and Skip Gaillard.
