= Anna Livbjerg =

Danish sailor

Personal information
- Nationality: Danish

Sailing career
- Sport: Sailing
- Classes: Europe, Nacra 17, Laser Radial
Medal record
Representing Denmark
Sailing
Europe World Championships
Gold medal – first place	2012 L'Escala	Women's Europe
Gold medal – first place	2013 Sonderborg	Women's Europe
Gold medal – first place	2014 La Rochelle	Women's Europe
Gold medal – first place	2015 Arendal	Women's Europe
Gold medal – first place	2016 Torbole	Women's Europe
Gold medal – first place	2017 Blanes	Women's Europe
Gold medal – first place	2018 Kühlungsborn	Women's Europe
Gold medal – first place	2019 El Balis	Women's Europe
Gold medal – first place	2021 Råå	Women's Europe
Gold medal – first place	2022 Douarnenez	Women's Europe
Gold medal – first place	2023 Vallensbæk	Women's Europe
Gold medal – first place	2024 Hanko	Women's Europe
Silver medal – second place	2011 Gravedona	Women's Europe
Bronze medal – third place	2010 Arkösund	Women's Europe
Bronze medal – third place	2007 Workum	Women's Europe

Anna Livbjerg is a Danish sailor who has won twelve Europe World Championships consecutivley between 2012 and 2024. She is the most successful Europe sailor in class history.
