= Tania Elías Calles =

Mexican sailor (born 1979)

Personal information
- Full name: Tania Elías Calles Wolf
- Born: 17 April 1979 (age 47) Mexico City, Mexico
- Height: 168 cm (5 ft 6 in)
- Weight: 66 kg (146 lb)

Sailing career
- Sport: Sailing
- Club: Club Náutico Avándaro
- Classes: Europe, ILCA 6
Medal record
Sailing
Representing Mexico
Pan American Games
Gold medal – first place	2003 Santo Domingo	Laser Radial
World Championships
Bronze medal – third place	2006 Los Angeles	Laser Radial

Tania Elías Calles Wolf (born 17 April 1979 in Mexico City) is a Mexican sailor. At 6 years old she started in the sport of sailing and she has competed at four Olympic Games. She is the great-granddaughter of general Plutarco Elías Calles.

== Olympic Games ==
She participated in the Olympics four times from 2000 to 2012, in Women's One Person Dinghy – both Europe and ILCA 6 (previously named Laser Radial) classes.

== Central American and Caribbean Games ==
Her main career highlight was winning gold at the 2002 Central American and Caribbean Games.

During the 2003 Pan American Games in Santo Domingo, Dominican Republic she won the gold medal in the Radial category.. In 2005 she won the bronze medal at the World Championships in Europe. In 2006 she won the bronze medal at the Women's Laser Radial World Championship, as well as the gold medal at the 2006 Central American and Caribbean Games. In 2007, she finished second at the World Championship held in Portugal, winning a spot to the 2008 Summer Olympics in Beijing, China. She won a silver medal at the 2007 Pan American Games in Rio de Janeiro, Brazil, and finished 13th at the Olympic Games in 2008. She established a World Guinness Record to seek sponsorships in March 2010 for the longest distance sailed unattended in a dinghy (300 nm). In 2011, at the World Championships in Perth, Australia she obtained qualification to the 2012 Summer Olympics. At the London Games she finished in 10th place in the women's laser radial. She is a member of the athlete commission for the World Antidoping Agency since 2012 and the representative for high performance athletes at her National Antidoping Committee. Writer and author of her autobiography called "The Challenge, in pursuit of Olympic Glory" released in the summer of 2013.
