= Kristine Roug =

Danish sailor (born 1975)

Medal record

Women's sailing

Representing Denmark

Olympic Games
Gold medal – first place	1996 Atlanta	Europe class

Cristine Storm Lassen (née Kristine Roug, born 12 March 1975 in Hørsholm) is a Danish sailor and Olympic champion.

She won a gold medal in the Europe class at the 1996 Summer Olympics in Atlanta. She was named Danish Sailer of the year in 1994 and again in 1996.

Kristine sailed the Europe dinghy between 1990 and 2000. In summer 1994 she won the world championship in the Europe dinghy two weeks later she won ISAF single dinghies for women in the Laser, and half-year later in January 1995 in New Zealand she won once again the World Championship. At that time the Danish media really got interested in her talent and compared her with the five times Olympic champion Paul Elvstrøm.

With the Olympic gold medal in 1996, Kristine Roug made several Danish outstanding records:

- The first Danish woman to win gold in sailing
- The first Danish woman to win Olympic gold within the last 48 years
- The youngest Dane to win Olympic gold

== Awards ==
Europe World Championships

- 1994: 1st place
- 1995: 1st place
- 1997: 2nd place
- 1998: 3rd place
- 2000: 1st place

ISAF World Sailing Games

- 1998, 1st place in Laser Radial

Kiel Week

- 1997: 1st place
- 1999: 1st place
- 2000: 1st place

Summer olympics

- 1996, 1st place in Europe
- 2000, 10th place in Europe
