= Vila Real de Santo António (parish) =

- Civil parish
- Location in Portugal
- Coordinates: 37.194°N 7.416°W
- Country: Portugal
- Region: Algarve
- Intermunic. comm.: Algarve
- District: Faro
- Municipality: Vila Real de Santo António

Area
  - Total: 10.99 km^{2} (4.24 sq mi)

Population (2011)
  - Total: 11,946
  - Density: 1,087/km^{2} (2,815/sq mi)
- Time zone: UTC+00:00 (WET)
  - Summer (DST): UTC+01:00 (WEST)

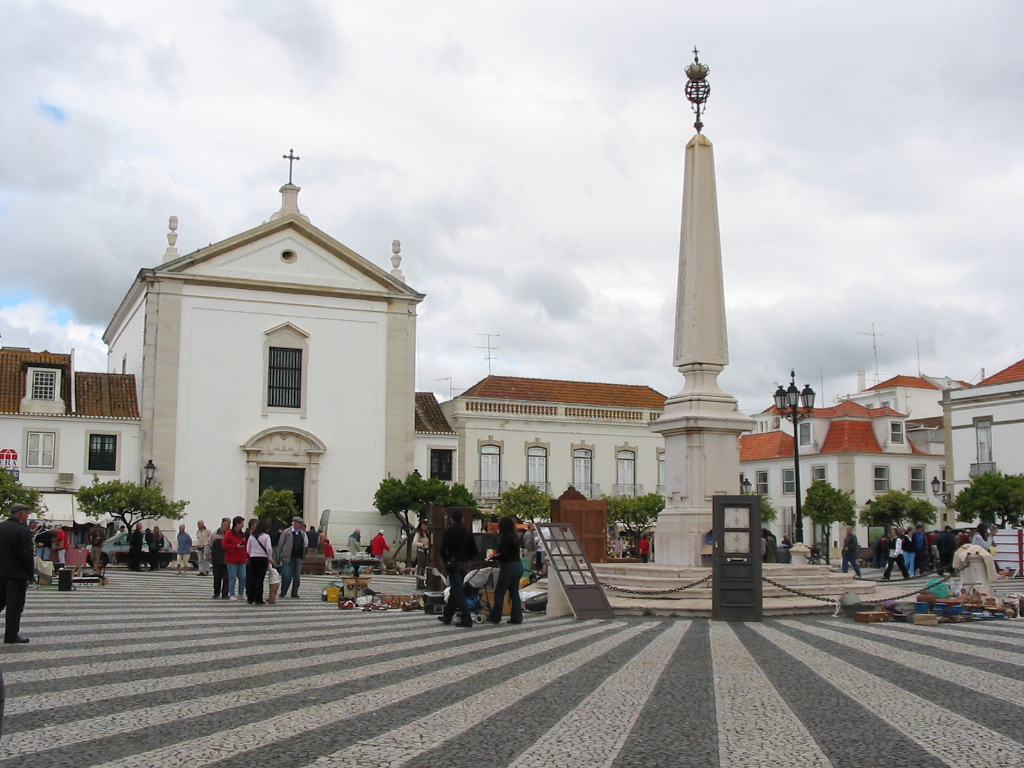
The main square in Vila Real de Santo António.

Vila Real de Santo António is the parish of Vila Real de Santo António Municipality, Algarve Region, that contains the city of Vila Real de Santo António. The population in 2011 was 11,946, in an area of 10.99 km².

The city of Vila Real de Santo António is situated at the southeasternmost tip of Portugal. The city lies on one side of the mouth of the Guadiana River, at the point where it flows into the Atlantic Ocean. Spain lies on the opposite side of the river, and from there are directly facing Vila Real de Santo António the city of Ayamonte and its adjacent Isla Canela.
