= Julia Carlsson =

Swedish former football forward

Personal information
- Date of birth: 8 April 1975 (age 51)
- Place of birth: Sweden
- Position: Forward

Senior career*
Years	Team	Apps	(Gls)
1996	Älvsjö AIK		

International career
1996	Sweden	15 (?)	
- * Club domestic league appearances and goals

Julia Carlsson (born 8 April 1975) is a Swedish former football forward. She played for the Sweden women's national football team and competed at the 1996 Summer Olympics. At the club level, she played for Älvsjö AIK.

== See also ==
- Sweden at the 1996 Summer Olympics
