= Margriet Matthijsse =

Dutch sailor (born 1977)

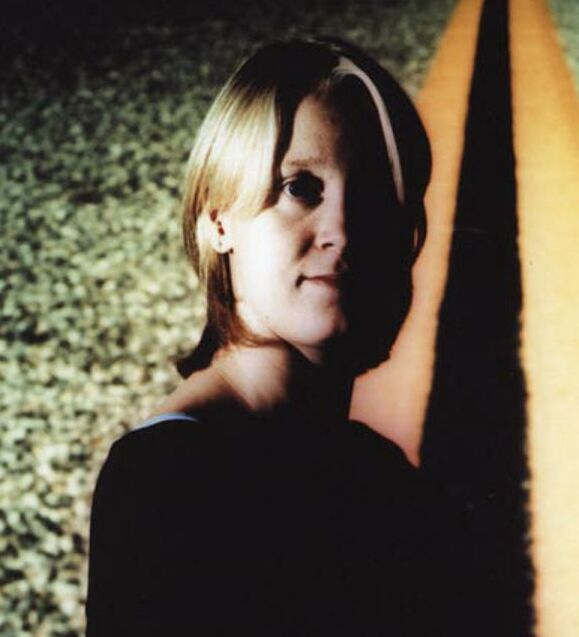
- Matthijsse in 2006

Personal information
- Full name: Margriet Matthijsse
- Nationality: Dutch
- Born: April 16, 1977 (age 49) Rotterdam, Netherlands
- Height: 1.77 m (5.8 ft)

Sailing career
- Sport: Sailing
- Club: Rotterdamsche Zeilvereeniging
- Classes: Europe; 470
Competition record
Sailing
Representing Netherlands
Olympic Games
Silver medal – second place	1996 Savannah	Europe
Silver medal – second place	2000 Sydney	Europe
- Updated on 10 February 2014

Margriet Matthijsse (born 16 April 1977, in Rotterdam) is a sailor from the Netherlands, who represented her country for the first time at the 1996 Olympics in Atlanta. Matthijsse took the silver in Europe. In the 2000 Olympics in Sydney Matthijsse took her second silver medal again in Europe. Matthijsse final Olympic appearance was during the 2004 Olympics in Athens. As crew in the Women's 470 with helmsman Lisa Westerhof she took 9th place.

She received the ISAF World Sailor of the Year Award in 1999.

Awards
Preceded by Netherlands; Carolijn Brouwer	ISAF World Sailor of the Year (female); 1999	Succeeded by United Kingdom; Shirley Robertson
