= Courtenay Becker-Dey =

American competitive sailor (born 1965)

Personal information
- Full name: Courtenay Compton Becker-Dey
- Born: April 27, 1965 (age 61) Greenwich, Connecticut, U.S.
Medal record
Sailing
Representing the United States
Olympic Games
Bronze medal – third place	1996 Atlanta	Europe class

Courtenay Becker-Dey (born April 27, 1965) is an American competitive sailor and Olympic medalist. She was born in Greenwich, Connecticut. She won a bronze medal in the Europe class at the 1996 Summer Olympics in Atlanta. She also competed at the 2000 Summer Olympics.

Becker-Day sails out of American Yacht Club.
