= Min Dezillie =

Belgian sailor

Personal information
- Full name: Min Dezillie
- Nationality: Belgium
- Born: 15 May 1973 (age 53) Duffel, Belgium
- Height: 1.68 m (5 ft 6 in)
- Weight: 63 kg (139 lb)

Sailing career
- Sport: Sailing
- Club: WVD Mechelen
- Class: Dinghy

Min Dezillie (born 15 May 1973) is a Belgian former sailor, who specialized in the Europe class. She represented her nation Belgium in three editions of the Olympic Games (1992, 2000, and 2004) and came closest to the medal haul on her second Olympic stint in Sydney, finishing sixth overall.

Dezillie made her Olympic debut, as a nineteen-year-old, in Barcelona 1992, finishing a credible eighteenth in the inaugural Europe class with a satisfying net grade of 115.

Despite her absence from the 1996 Summer Olympics in Atlanta, Dezillie successfully came back on the startline in Sydney 2000 for her second Olympic appearance, sailing in the Europe class. There, she had a solid feat to climb extensively in sixth position with a net score of 68, but missed the podium by nearly a twenty-point deficit.

Twelve years after competing in her first Games, Dezillie qualified for her third Belgian team, as a 31-year-old, in the Europe class at the 2004 Summer Olympics in Athens, by placing among the top 40 and receiving a berth from the 2003 ISAF World Championships in Cádiz, Spain. Dezillie got off to a fantastic start of the series with a substantial lead over the rest of the fleet, but a yachting malfunction in the midway and a disastrous feat on the last few races slipped her out of medal contention to fifteenth overall with a net grade of 133.
