= Cecilie Dahl (born 1858) =

Norwegian painter and author

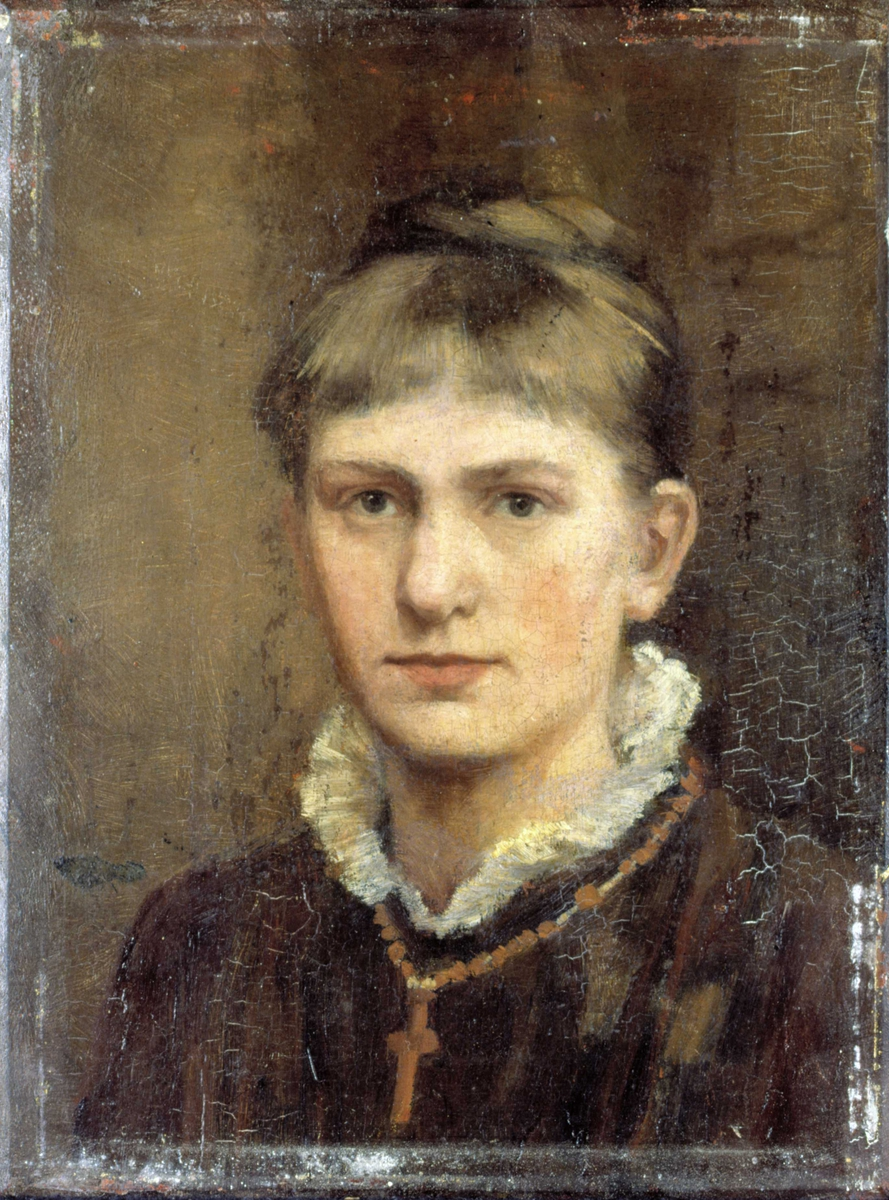
- Cecilie Dahl, self portrait (1888)
- Born: 26 March 1858; Kristiania, Norway
- Died: 5 August 1943 (aged 85); Oslo, Norway
- Education: Knud Bergslien's art school, Académie Colarossi
- Occupation(s): artist, author
- Known for: portraits, genre paintings, landscapes
- Notable work: Augustkveld, Hakadal
- Parents: Ludvig Wilhelm Dahl (father); Cathrine Lyders née Bonnevie (mother)
- Relatives: Nils Alstrup Dahl, Ingerid Dahl (sibling painters)

Cecilie Dahl (1858–1943) was a Norwegian artist who painted portraits, genre paintings and landscapes. From the early 1880s, she exhibited at the Oslo Kunstforening and in 1888 presented a work inspired by Henrik Ibsen's Brand at the Nordic Exhibition in Copenhagen. Her best works are those of women and children from the mid-1890s, characterized by a soft, rather melancholy atmosphere. She was inspired by evening scenes, as in Augustkveld, Hakadal in the collection of the Norwegian National Gallery.

== Early life and education ==
Born in the Vestre Akter district of Oslo (then known as Kristiania) on 26 March 1858, Cecilie Dahl was the daughter of the physician Ludvig Wilhelm Dahl (1826–1890) and Anna Cathrine Lyders née Bonnevie (1835–1893). The second of 11 children, her siblings included Nils Alstrup Dahl (1876–1940) and Ingerid Dahl (1861–1944) who both also became painters. After studying under Amaldus Nielsen at Knud Bergslien's art school in 1880, she was trained by Karl Gussow in Berlin (c. 1881–1882). Later, she attended the Académie Colarossi in Paris where she studied under the naturalist Pascal Dagnan-Bouveret (1886–1887). In 1888, she was a student of the Norwegian Eilif Peterssen and while in Denmark from 1896 to 1900, she studied under Johan Rohde and G.F. Clement.

== Career ==
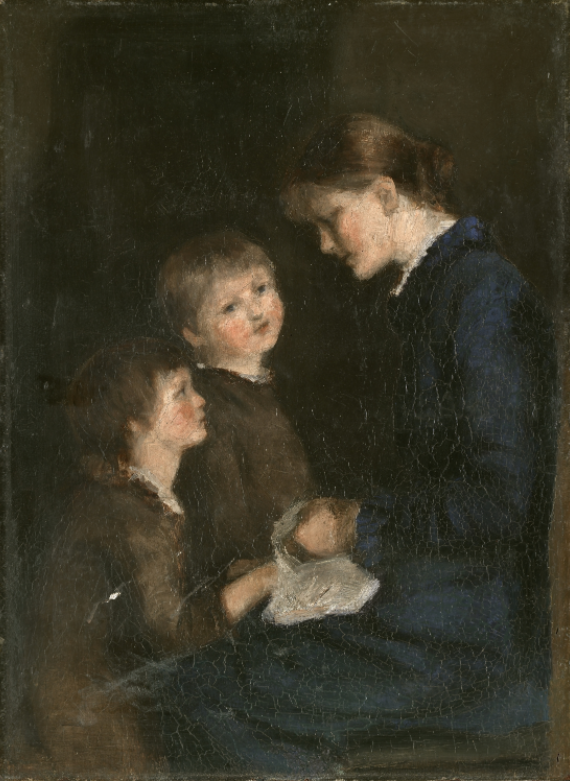
Dahl's portrait of Anna Munch with her two small siblings (1877)

Her early portraits from 1877 of her sister, the author Anna Munch, and of Munch with her two small siblings are typical of Dahl's dreamy depiction of her subjects. She exhibited from the early 1880s at the Oslo Kunstforening, becoming a frequent exhibitor at the autumn shows. Among her finest works are those of women and children in the 1880s, including Dame i ridedrakt (Woman in Riding Attire, 1884) and a portrait of the opera singer Eva Sars (1886). In 1888, a work inspired by Henrik Ibsen's Brand which was selected for the Nordic Exhibition in Copenhagen was considered too sentimental by one of the critics.

She turned from painting to writing at the end of the 1880s, publishing Bag Kulissene (Behind the Scenes), a collection of three short stories in 1890. In 1892, inspired by Carl Bloch's painting Trøsteren (The Comforter), she created the altar painting for Eid Church in Vestland. Her later works consist principally of landscapes from the east of Norway, often including children. She painted several scenes of summer evenings, including the colourful Augustkveld, Hakadal in the collection of Norway's National Gallery. In addition to collective and solo exhibitions in Norway, her works have been presented in Copenhagen (1888), Stockholm (1904), Brighton (1913), Royal Society of British Artists (1928) and Riga (1934).

Cecilie Dahl died in Oslo on 5 August 1943. A retrospective exhibition of her work was held the same year by the Oslo Kunstforening.
