= Anna Munch =

Norwegian novelist and dramatist (1856–1932)

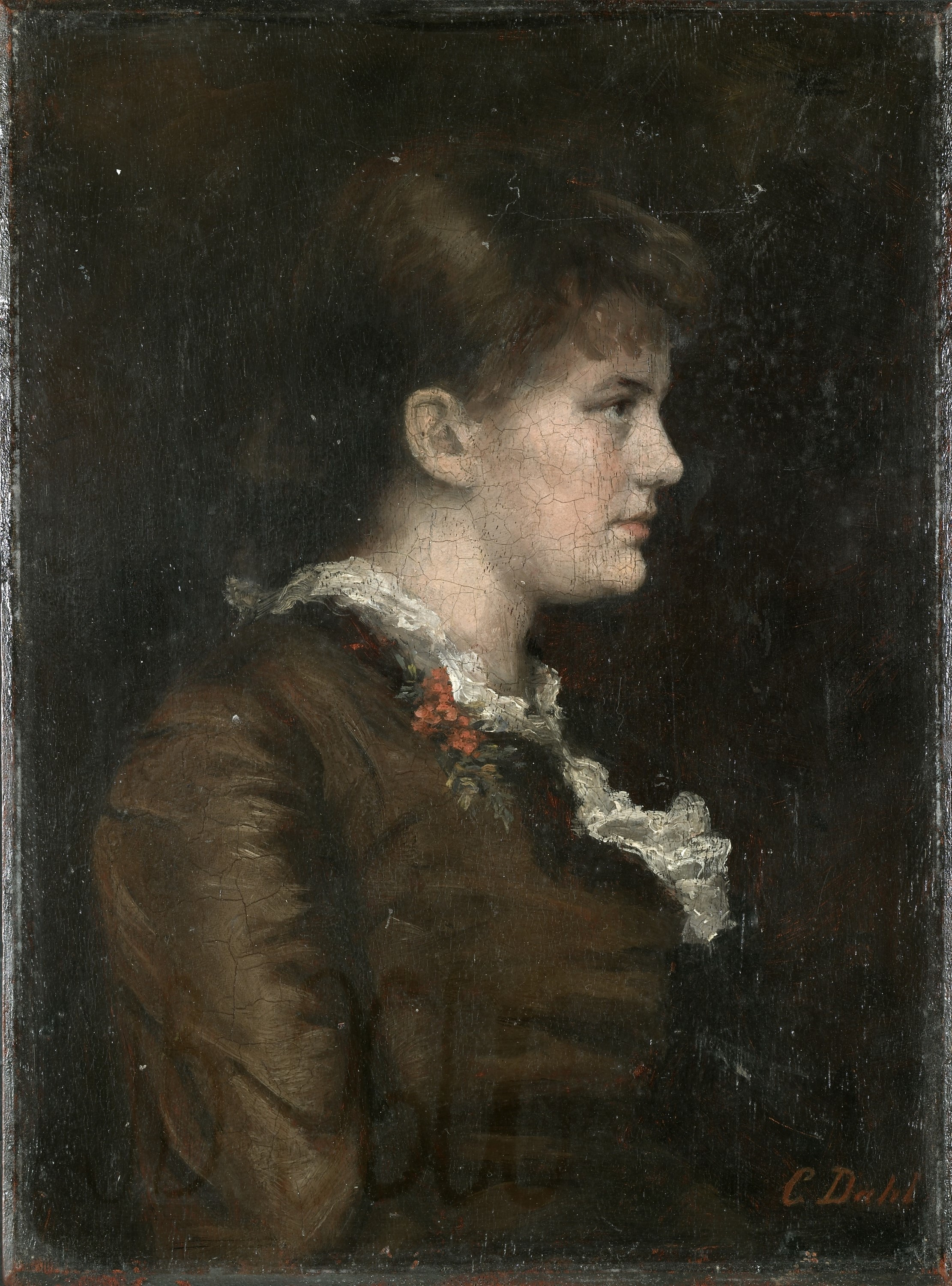
- Portrait of Anna Dahl by her sister Cecilie (1877)
- Born: Anna Dahl; 4 August 1856; Christiania, Norway
- Died: 29 November 1932 (aged 76); Oslo, Norway
- Education: Nissens Pigeskole
- Occupations: Novelist and dramatist
- Spouses: Peter Anker Ragnvald Munch (m. 1883); Sigurd Mathiesen (m. 1910)
- Children: 1
- Relatives: Cecilie Dahl (sister)

Anna Munch née Dahl (4 August 1856 – 29 November 1932) was a Norwegian novelist and dramatist whose works address conflicts between the sexes, frequently based on her own experience of marriage and divorce. After a difficult relationship with her first husband Peter Munch, she met the much younger writer Sigurd Mathiesen whom she later married. Her early novel Kvinder. Et Stykke Udviklingshistorie. Kristiania-fortælling (Women. A Piece on Development History. Christiania Tale, 1892) is about women artists. Her principal work, the novel Glæde (Joy, 1904), presents a sensitive description of the utopian world of childhood.

== Early life and education ==
Born on 4 August 1856 in the Vestre Aker (now a district of Oslo), Munch was the daughter of the physician Ludvig Vilhelm Dahl (1826–90) and his wife Anna Cathrine Lyders née Bonnevie (1835–93). She was the first of the family's 11 children, who included the artists Cecilie Dahl (1858–1943), Nils Alstrup Dahl (1876–1940), and Ingerid Dahl (1861–1944). She was raised in Christiania and Trondheim and experienced a difficult childhood subject to her father's view that women were less skilled than men.

Munch completed her education at Nissens Pigeskole.

== Career ==
After leaving her first husband in the 1890s, Munch devoted herself to writing.

In her first novel, To mennesker (Two People, 1898), Munch describes her passionate love for the writer Knut Hamsun. Her second, Kvinder (1989), covers the contrasts for women between marriage and free love and presents the pleasures of the Bohemian way of life. Her later writing evokes contradictions between erotic love and platonic relationships which provide for lasting companionship. The theme is also central to her play Psyche (1893). Her most successful work, Glæde (1910), is a semi-autobiographical novel describing the experiences of Ester's now lost utopian childhood as she suffers the ordeals of later life.

== Personal life ==
In 1883, Munch married Peter Anker Ragnvald Munch, an officer and teacher, with whom she had a daughter Signe. Due to his poor treatment of her, including refusing to provide her with paper on which she could write, she referred to him as a tyrant. She dissolved the marriage in the 1890s.

In 1910, she married the writer Sigurd Mathiesen (1871–1958). After coping with difficult tines in Stavern, a small town in Norway, the couple moved to Denmark.Though the couple initially enjoyed a happy relationship, they slowly lost interest in each other.

Munch died in Oslo on 29 November 1932.
