= Siren Sundby =

Norwegian sailor

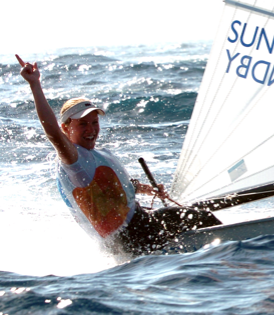
- Sundby in 2004

Personal information
- Born: 2 December 1982 (age 43) Lørenskog, Norway
- Height: 165 cm (5 ft 5 in)
- Spouse: Christopher Gundersen

Sailing career
- Sport: Sailing
- Club: Soon Seilforening
- Class: Europe
Medal record
Women's sailing
Representing Norway
Olympic Games
Gold medal – first place	2004 Athens	Europe class
Youth Sailing World Championships
Gold medal – first place	2000	Byte class
Europe World Championship
Gold medal – first place	2003 Cádiz	Europe class
Gold medal – first place	2004 Cagliari	Europe class
Silver medal – second place	2002 Hamilton	Europe class
European Championship
Gold medal – first place	2003 Palma de Mallorca	Europe class

Siren Sundby (born 2 December 1982 in Lørenskog) is a former Norwegian sailor.

She won an Olympic gold medal in the Europe-class in the 2004 Summer Olympics. She also won the world championships in the Europe-class in 2003 and 2004.

Sundby was selected female World Sailor of the year by the World Sailing in 2003.

Sundby revealed in July 2006 that she was giving up sailing. Since her sailing partner Karianne Melleby became pregnant and gave up sailing, Sundby had been looking for a new partner, but then decided that there was not enough time to prepare with a new partner before the 2008 Summer Olympics, and still have a realistic chance of winning gold.

== Personal life ==
Her parents live in Son, south of Oslo. She lives in Oslo with her husband, Christopher Gundersen, who is a sailor. She has a Bachelor of Science in Engineering from Technical University of Denmark, 2008, and is attending her final year of the Master program, Innovation and Entrepreneurship, 2011, at BI Norwegian Business School in Oslo.
