= Serge Kats =

Dutch sailor (born 1971)

Personal information
- Full name: Serge Melfinn Kats
- Nationality: Netherlands
- Born: 9 September 1971 (age 54) Rotterdam
- Height: 1.84 m (6.0 ft)

Sailing career
- Sport: Sailing
- Club: Rotterdamsche Zeilvereeniging
- Class(es): Europe; Laser; Flying Dutchman; Star

Serge Melfinn Kats (born 9 September 1971 in Rotterdam) is a sailor from the Netherlands, who represented his country for the first time at the 1996 Summer Olympics in Savannah. There he took the 13th place in the Laser. Kats second and final Olympic appearance was during the 2000 Olympics in Sydney. In this competition Kats took the 4th place, again in the Laser.

Nowadays Kats is Manager Topsport at the Koninklijk Nederlands Watersport Verbond. He won the 2000 J/22 World Championship as helm.
