= Carolijn Brouwer =

Dutch sailor (born 1973)

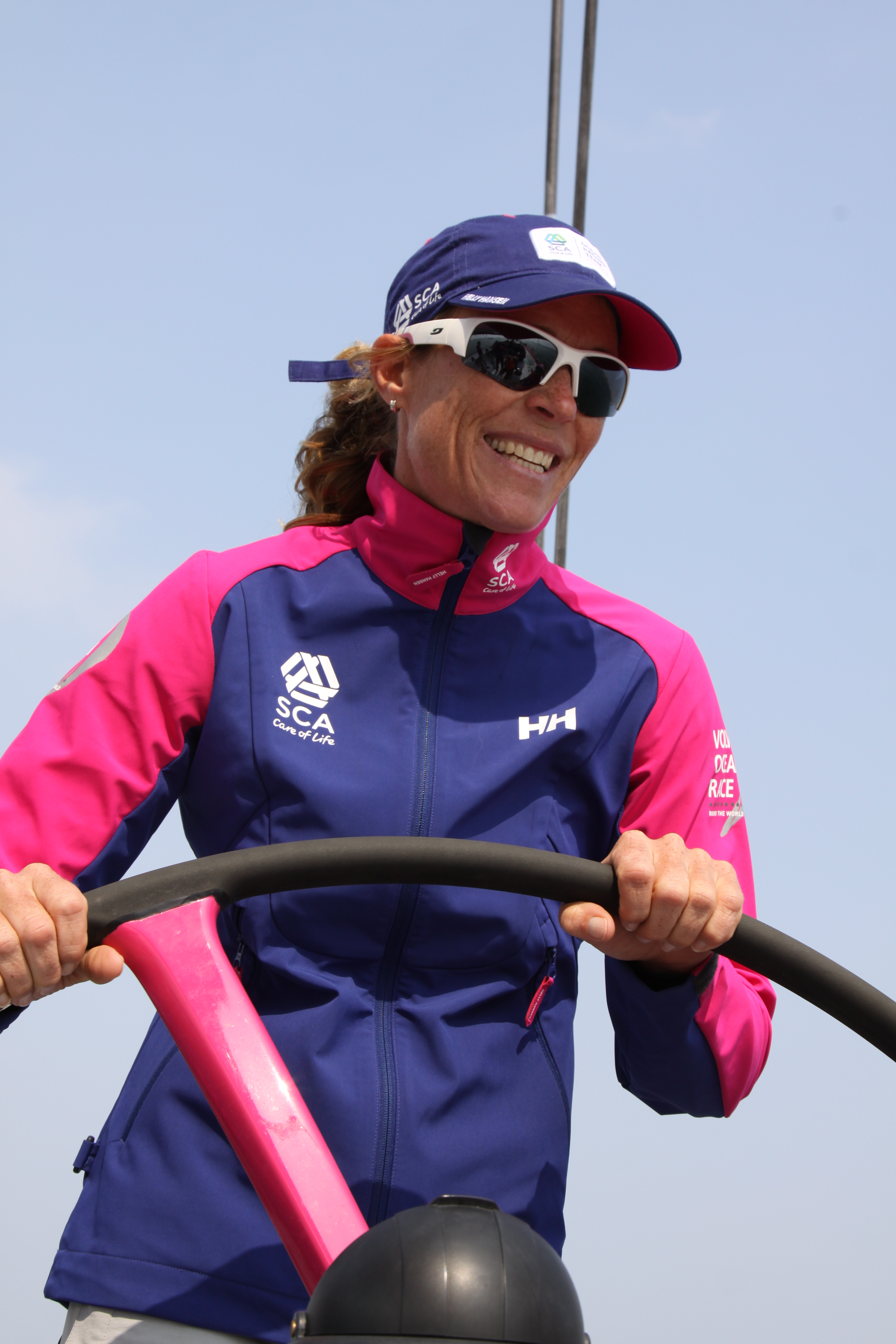

Personal information
- Full name: Carolijn Mariëlle Brouwer
- Nationality: Dutch; Belgium
- Born: 25 July 1973 (age 53) Leiden, Netherlands
- Height: 1.82 m (6 ft 0 in)

Sailing career
- Sport: Sailing
- Club: Watersport Vereniging Braassemermeer
- Classes: Laser Radial; Europe; Tornado
Medal record
Sailing
Representing Netherlands
Youth Sailing World Championships
Gold medal – first place	1991 Largs	Laser Radial
World Championships
Gold medal – first place	1993 Takapuna	Laser Radial
Gold medal – first place	1996 Palma de Mallorca	Europe
Gold medal – first place	1998 Travemünde	Europe
Silver medal – second place	1991 Porto Carrasa	Laser Radial
Silver medal – second place	1998 Medemblik	Laser Radial
Silver medal – second place	2001 Vilamoura	Europe
Representing Belgium
World Championships
Silver medal – second place	2007 Cascais	Tornado
- Updated on 27 April 2015

Carolijn Mariëlle Brouwer (born 25 July 1973, in Leiden) is a sailor from the Netherlands, who represented her country for the first time at the 2000 Summer Olympics in Sydney.

== Sailing Career ==
=== Olympics ===
At the 2000 Olympic Games she finished 13 place in the Women's 470 with crew Alexandra Verbeek. In the 2004 Olympics,

At the 2004 Olympic Games she finished 19th in the Europe.

At the 2008 Olympic Games she switch to the Tornado catamaran. However this time she sailed for Belgium with crew Sébastien Godefroid she took 12th place.

=== World Championships ===
- 1st

=== Offshore Sailing ===
Brouwer was crewmember in three Volvo Ocean Races:

- (United Kingdom) Amer Sports Too in 2001–02 (8th edition)
- (Sweden) Team SCA in 2014–15 (12th edition)
- (China) Dongfeng Race Team in 2017–18 (13th edition)

Brouwer is owner of 2B Sailing (2010–present).

== Awards ==
She received the ISAF World Sailor of the Year Award in 1998 and 2018.

Awards
Preceded by Ukraine; Ruslana Taran & Olena Pakholchyk	ISAF World Sailor of the Year (female); 1998	Succeeded by Netherlands; Margriet Matthijsse
