= Linda Andersen =

Norwegian sailor (born 1969)

Olympic medal record

Women's sailing

Representing Norway
Gold medal – first place	1992 Barcelona	Europe class

Linda Andersen, later Linda Cerup-Simonsen, (born 15 June 1969) is a Norwegian Olympic gold-medal winning sailor.

Linda Andersen was born in Tønsberg. She obtained silver medals in the Europe World Championships in 1988 and 1989. In the 1991 Europe European Championships, she won gold medal, and a bronze medal in 1992.

Andersen competed in the 1992 Summer Olympics in Barcelona, where she won gold medal in the Europe class. She also competed in the 1996 Summer Olympics in Atlanta.

She is a sister of Ida Andersen. Andersen represented Tønsberg Seilforening.
