= Mattias Rahm =

Swedish sailor

Johan Mattias Rahm (born 12 March 1973) is a Swedish Olympic sailor. He finished 12th in the 470 event at the 2000 Summer Olympics together with Johan Molund.

Sailing Biography: 1988 12th place optimist worlds 1990 Nordic junior Champion, Europe class 1992 Nordic Champion, Europe class 1994 World Champion, Europe class 1995 World Champion, Europe class 1998 3rd, 470 Worlds 1999 2nd, 470 Worlds 2005 - 2007 strategist and second helmsman, Victory Challenge, 32nd Americas Cup. 2008 Winner Match Cup Sweden. 2013 Winner M32 Cup, Scandinavia 2014 2nd place M32 Series Scandinavia. 2015 2nd place M32 Series Scandinavia
