= Johan Molund =

Swedish sailor

Carl Johan Styrbjörn Molund (born 13 October 1975) is a Swedish Olympic sailor. He finished 12th in the 470 event at the 2000 Summer Olympics together with Mattias Rahm and 4th in the 470 event at the 2004 Summer Olympics together with Martin Andersson.
