= Peder Rønholt =

Danish sailor

Personal information
- Nationality: Danish
- Born: 9 March 1974 (age 51) Faxe, Denmark

Sport
- Sport: Sailing

Peder Rønholt (born 9 March 1974) is a Danish sailor. He competed in the Laser event at the 2000 Summer Olympics.
