= Melanie Dennison =

Australian sailor

Personal information
- Born: 23 October 1973 (age 52) Mildura, Victoria, Australia
- Height: 178 cm (5 ft 10 in)

Sport
- Country: Australia

Sailing career
- Club: Royal Brighton Yacht Club

Melanie Jane Dennison (born 23 October 1973) is an Australian sailor who represented Australia at the 2000 Sydney Olympics.

Dennison was 1994 world champion in Women's Laser Radials held in Japan.

Dennison competed in the 2000 Europe dinghy event and finished in 15th place. Her best performances in the heats were a third and fourth in eleven race series.

After the 2000 Olympics Dennison trained at the Australian Institute of Sport sailing Ynglings with Fiona Herbert and Caroline Aders. They competed at the Princess Sofia Trophy Regatta in Spain in 2002.
