= Hans Jørgen Riber =

Danish sailor

Personal information
- Nationality: Danish
- Born: 30 July 1964 (age 60)

Sport
- Sport: Sailing

Hans Jørgen Riber (born 30 July 1964) is a Danish sailor who competed in the men's 470 event at the 1992 Summer Olympics.
