= Stefan Rahm =

Swedish sailor

Personal information
- Nationality: Swedish
- Born: 1 May 1968 (age 56); Lerum, Sweden

Sport
- Sport: Sailing

Stefan Rahm (born 1 May 1968) is a Swedish sailor. He competed in the Tornado event at the 1992 Summer Olympics.
