= Lone Sørensen =

Danish sailor (born 1962)

Personal information
- Nationality: Danish
- Born: 8 June 1962 (age 63) Frederiksberg, Denmark

Sport
- Sport: Sailing

Achievements and titles
- Olympic finals: 1988 Summer Olympics

Lone Sørensen (born 8 June 1962) is a Danish sailor. She competed in the women's 470 event at the 1988 Summer Olympics.
