= Shen Xiaoying =

Chinese sailor

Shen Xiaoying (born 2 March 1983) is a Chinese sailor who competed in the 2004 Summer Olympics.
