= Silvia Zennaro =

Italian sailor

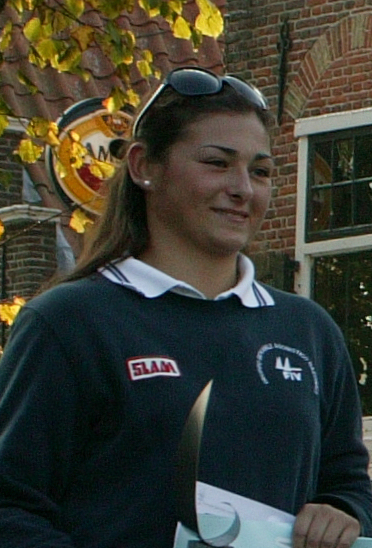
- Silvia Zennaro at the 2008 Vintage Yachting Games

Personal information
- Nationality: Italy
- Born: 26 October 1989 (age 36)

Sport
- Sport: Sailing
- Event: Laser Radial

Silvia Zennaro (born October 26, 1989) is an Italian sailor. She finished 7th at the 2020 Summer Olympics in Tokyo 2021, competing in Laser Radial. She placed 22nd in the Laser Radial event at the 2016 Summer Olympics (22).
