= Anette Viborg Andreasen =

Danish sailor (born 1990)

Anette Viborg Andreasen (born 17 September 1990) is a Danish sailor. She and Allan Nørregaard placed 12th in the Nacra 17 event at the 2016 Summer Olympics.
