= Mathilde Géron =

French sailor (born 1986)

Medal record

Sailing

Representing France

Mediterranean Games
Gold medal – first place	2013 Mersin	Women's 470

Mathilde Géron (born 24 March 1986 in Sainte-Adresse) is a French sailor. She competed in the 470 class at the 2012 Summer Olympics.

Géron partook in the Tour Voile sailing race in July 2019, where she finished 12th as skipper of the all-women team La Boulangère.
