= Mette Munch =

Danish sailor

Personal information
- Nationality: Danish
- Born: 16 June 1966 (age 58); Aarhus, Denmark

Sport
- Sport: Sailing

Mette Munch (born 16 June 1966) is a Danish sailor. She competed in the women's 470 event at the 1988 Summer Olympics.
