= Ida Andersen =

Norwegian sailor

Ida Kathrine Andersen-Berthet (born 1968) is a Norwegian sailor from Tønsberg, and world champion from 1987.

Along with Tonje Kristiansen she participated in the 470 class at the 1992 Summer Olympics, where they placed 14th. At the 1996 Summer Olympics she placed 10th, together with her sister Linda Andersen.
