= Helen Montilla =

Spanish sailor

Personal information
- Nationality: Spanish
- Born: 4 December 1969 (age 55); Barcelona, Spain

Sport
- Sport: Sailing

Helen Montilla Santos (born 4 December 1969) is a Spanish sailor. She competed in the Europe event at the 1996 Summer Olympics.
