= Chiara Calligaris =

Italian sailor

Personal information
- Nationality: Italian
- Born: 8 November 1971 (age 55) Gorizia, Italy

Sport
- Sport: Sailing

Chiara Calligaris (born 8 November 1971) is an Italian sailor. She competed in the Yngling event at the 2008 Summer Olympics.
