= Carolina Toll =

Norwegian sailor

Personal information
- Nationality: Norwegian
- Born: 1973 (age 51–52); Gothenburg, Sweden

Sport
- Sport: Sailing
- Club: Royal Norwegian Yacht Club

Carolina Toll (born 1973) is a Norwegian sailor. She was born in Gothenburg, and represented the Royal Norwegian Yacht Club. She competed at the 2000 Summer Olympics in Sydney, where she placed 16th in the Women's 470 competition, together with Jeanette Lunde.
