= Tonje Kristiansen =

Norwegian sailor

Personal information
- Born: 29 September 1967 (age 59) Tønsberg, Norway

Sport
- Sport: Sailing

Tonje Kristiansen (born 29 September 1967) is a retired Norwegian sailor. She was born in Tønsberg. Along with Ida Andersen she participated in the 470 class at the 1992 Summer Olympics, where they placed 14th.
