= Arianna Bogatec =

Italian sailor (born 1969)

Personal information
- Nationality: Italian
- Born: 16 June 1969 (age 56) Trieste, Italy
- Height: 168 cm (5 ft 6 in)
- Weight: 63 kg (139 lb; 9 st 13 lb)

Sport
- Sport: Sailing

Arianna Bogatec (born 16 June 1969) is an Italian sailor. She competed in the 1992 Summer Olympics and the 1996 Summer Olympics.

She participated at the 2015 Barcolana regatta.
