= Sailing at the Summer World University Games =

Sailing competitions

- Events: 8 (men: 4; women: 4)

Games
- 1959; 1960; 1961; 1962; 1963; 1964; 1965; 1966; 1967; 1968; 1970; 1970; 1973; 1972; 1975; 1975; 1977; 1978; 1979; 1981; 1983; 1985; 1987; 1989; 1991; 1993; 1995; 1997; 1999; 2001; 2003; 2005; 2007; 2009; 2011; 2013; 2015; 2017; 2019; 2021; 2025

Sailing competition has been in the Universiade since the twentieth Olympic Games Sailing Regatta at the Universida of ESP. Olympic boardsailing was included at this premier of sailing at the UG. The boardsailing name changed to Olympic windsurfing after the Mistral equipment. (The professional association also shifted from PBA to PWA.) There may be an event of Olympic sailing during the 2020s or 2030s. The current windsurfing class is called the IQ foil, with a new design that will have appeal to university students. The University Games Olympic Class Sailing Regattas were included in 1999, 2005, and 2011, and in 2019 as an optional sport.

== Equipment ==
The boat classes have classic designs that often continue over decades. The windsurfing classes have changed dramatically. The IOC called the sport "Olympic boardsailing" to affirm the inclusion to Olympic sailing, then the more mainstream and classic name "windsurfing" was adopted. The recent foil design lifts the board completely above the water with only water contact at the fin. This creates an astonishing appearance of hovering over the water. The dramatically reduced resistance from the water makes this IQ foil design ultra-efficient, with decreased effort from the student and increased pace over the water.

Event	Class	Gender	Year			
			99	05	11	19
One-person dinghies	Europe	W	●			
One-person dinghies	Laser Radial	W		●	●	
One-person dinghies	Laser	M	●	●	●	
Two-person dinghies	470	W	●	●		
Two-person dinghies	470	M	●	●		
Boardsailing/windsurfing	Mistral	W	●	●		
Boardsailing/windsurfing	Mistral	M	●	●		
Boardsailing/windsurfing	RS:X	W			●	
Boardsailing/windsurfing	RS:X	M			●	
Boardsailing/windsurfing	IQ Foil	W				
Boardsailing/windsurfing	IQ Foil	M				
Team racing	470	M			●	
Team racing	Laser Radial	Mx			●	
Team racing	Techno 293	Mx			●	
Match racing	RS21	Mx				●
Total			6	6	8	1

Legend: W – Women; M – Men; Mx – Mixed

== Results ==
=== Women ===
==== Sailboard/windsurfer ====
Games	Gold	Silver	Bronze
1999	Justine Gardahaut (FRA)	Romy Kinzl (GER)	Margua Stalman (NED)
2005	Romy Kinzl (GER)	Flavia Tartaglini (ITA)	Olha Maslivets (UKR)
2011	Chen Peina (CHN)	Megumi Komine (JPN)	Małgorzata Białecka (POL)

==== Europe ====
Games	Gold	Silver	Bronze
1999	Vanessa Almeida Querjazu (ESP)	Neus Garriga Turón (ESP)	Larissa Nevierov (ITA)

=== Laser Radial ===
Games	Gold	Silver	Bronze
2005	Katarzyna Szotyńska (POL)	Anna Tunnicliffe (USA)	Krystal Weir (AUS)
2011	Zhang Dongshuang (CHN)	Victoria Jing Hua Chan (SIN)	Yevgeniya Kuznetsova (RUS)

==== 470 ====
Games	Gold	Silver	Bronze
1999	Perana Via-Dufrense and Sandra Azon Canalda (ESP)	Anna Basalkina and Victoria Oukraintseva (RUS)	Shany Kedmy and Anat Fabrikant (ISR)
2005	Camille Lecointre and Gwendolyn Cemaitre (FRA)	Reiko Takahashi and Naoko Kamata (JPN)	Elisabetta Saccheggiani and Myriam Cutolo (ITA)

=== Sailboard/windsurfer ===
Games	Gold	Silver	Bronze
1999	Cédric Leroy (FRA)	Maksym Oberemko (UKR)	Adrian Jones (GBR)
2005	Fabrice Hassen (FRA)	Piotr Myszka (POL)	Toni Wilhelm (GER)
2011	Fang Zhennan (CHN)	Łukasz Grodzicki (POL)	Lee Tae-hoon (KOR)

==== Laser ====
Games	Gold	Silver	Bronze
1999	Maciej Grabowski (POL)	Luis Martínez (sailor) (ESP)	Diego Negri (ITA)
2005	Andrew Campbell (USA)	Kemal Muslubas (TUR)	Johan Cechosz (FRA)
2011	Daniel Mihelić (CRO)	Malte Kamrath (GER)	Sergey Komissarov (RUS)

==== 470 ====
Games	Gold	Silver	Bronze
1999	Tomasz Stańczyk; Tomasz Jakubiak (POL)	Gustavo Martínez Doreste; Tunte Cantero (ESP)	Steven Hunt; Michael Miller (USA)
2005	Šime Fantela and Igor Marenić (CRO)	Sergey Desukevich and Pavel Logunov (BLR)	Tobias Etter and Felix Steiger (SUI)
2011	Vladimir Chaus and Denis Gribanov (RUS)	Fábio Silva and Gustavo Thiesen (BRA)	Erika Tokushige and Jumpei Hokazono (JPN)

=== Mixed ===
==== Team ====
Games	Gold	Silver	Bronze
2005	France (FRA)	Poland (POL)	Germany (GER)

==== 470 ====
Games	Gold	Silver	Bronze
2011	Russia (RUS); Vladimir Chaus; Denis Gribanov; Alisa Kirilyuk; Liudmila Dmitrieva	United States (USA); Perry Emsiek; Scott Furnary; Zeke Horowitz; Alyssa Aitken	Brazil (BRA); Gustavo Thiesen; Fábio Silva; Isabel Swan; Martine Grael

==== Laser Radial ====
Games	Gold	Silver	Bronze
2011	United States (USA); Colin Smith; Frederick Strammer; Elizabeth Barry	Australia (AUS); Alexandra Jane South; Tristan Brown; James Burnam	France (FRA); Mathilde De Kerangat; Jules Ferrer; Antony Munos

==== Techno 293 ====
Games	Gold	Silver	Bronze
2011	China (CHN); Xie Lidiao; Chen Zhiwei	China (CHN); Wu Shifu; Chen Lina	Japan (JPN); Megumi Izedo; Jun Ogawa

==== RS21 ====
Games	Gold	Silver	Bronze
2019	Finland (FIN); Alexander Grönblom; Oskari Muhonen; Catharina Sandman; Cecilia Sandman	Austria (AUT); Johanna Daum; Stefan Scharnagl; Luis Wenger-Oehn; Hannah Ziegler	Singapore (SGP); Scott Lan; Jillian Lee; Tan Jen-e; Cheryl Teo

== Medal table ==
Last updated after the 2019 Summer Universiade.

Rank	Nation	Gold	Silver	Bronze	Total
1	France (FRA)	5	0	2	7
2	China (CHN)	4	1	0	5
3	Poland (POL)	3	3	1	7
4	Spain (ESP)	2	3	0	5
5	United States (USA)	2	2	1	5
6	Russia (RUS)	2	1	2	5
7	Croatia (CRO)	2	0	0	2
8	Germany (GER)	1	2	2	5
9	Finland (FIN)	1	0	0	1
10	Japan (JPN)	0	2	2	4
11	Italy (ITA)	0	1	3	4
12	Australia (AUS)	0	1	1	2
12	Brazil (BRA)	0	1	1	2
12	Singapore (SIN)	0	1	1	2
12	Ukraine (UKR)	0	1	1	2
16	Austria (AUT)	0	1	0	1
16	Belarus (BLR)	0	1	0	1
16	Turkey (TUR)	0	1	0	1
19	Great Britain (GBR)	0	0	1	1
19	Israel (ISR)	0	0	1	1
19	Netherlands (NED)	0	0	1	1
19	South Korea (KOR)	0	0	1	1
19	Switzerland (SUI)	0	0	1	1
Totals (23 entries)		22	22	22	66
