= Sailing at the 2004 Summer Olympics =

Sailing at the Games of the XXVIII Olympiad
- Venues: Agios Kosmas Olympic Sailing Centre
- Dates: First race: 14 August 2004; Last race: 28 August 2004
- Competitors: 400 (261 male, 139 female) from 61 nations
- Boats: 268

Sailing/Yachting is an Olympic sport that has been part of the Olympic programme starting from the Games of the 1st Olympiad (1896 Olympics in Athens, Greece). With the exception of 1904 and possibly the canceled 1916 Summer Olympics, sailing has always been included on the Olympic schedule. The Sailing program in 2004 consisted of eleven disciplines divided over nine sailing classes. For each discipline multiple races were scheduled between 14 and 28 August 2004 along the coast near Athens. Athens hosted the Olympic sailing competitions for the second time, having done so during the 1896 Summer Olympics. However, in 1896, the sailing competition was cancelled due to heavy storms and further bad weather conditions. This time the weather conditions were good. The sailing event was executed on the several types of Olympic courses in different course areas using the 'Fleetrace' and 'Matchrace' formats.

== Venue ==
Agios Kosmas Olympic Sailing Centre
- Ολυμπιακό Κέντρο Ιστιοπλοϊας Αγίου Κοσμά
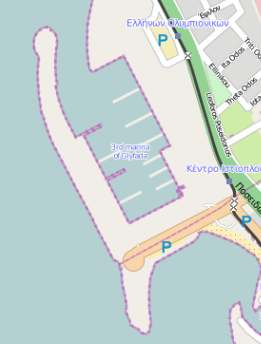
- Agios Kosmas Olympic Sailing Centre
- Former names: Agios Kosmos Marina

General information
- Status: Completed
- Type: Olympic harbor
- Location: Coastal area of Southern Attica, Poseidonos Avenue, 16777, Elliniko, Greece
- Coordinates: 37°52′36″N 23°43′39″E
- Elevation: Sealevel
- Construction started: 1960's
- Completed: 31 January 2004
- Opened: 2 August 2004
- Inaugurated: 13 August 2004
- Renovation cost: € 10,500,000
- Client: Greece Olympic Committee
- Owner: Seirios AE

Technical details
- Floor area: 336,289 square metres (3,619,780 sq ft)

Design and construction
- Main contractor: Ministry for the Environment, Physical Planning and Public Works.

Other information
- Seating type: For medal ceremonies
- Seating capacity: 1,600 spectators

According to the IOC statutes, the contests in all sport disciplines must be held either in, or as close as possible to the city which the IOC has chosen. Among others, an exception can be made for the Olympic sailing events. However the situation in Athens is very suitable for sailing. Therefore, the racing was organized at the Agios Kosmos Marina at the coastal area of Southern Attica some 14 km south of Athens city centre and close to the old airport. This harbor was built in the 1960s but for the 2004 Summer Games it was completely reconstructed to form the Agios Kosmas Olympic Sailing Centre. The Agios Kosmas Olympic Sailing Centre was completed on 31 January 2004. On clear day the Acropolis could be seen from the course areas.

== Competition ==
=== Overview ===
Continents	Countries	Disciplines	Classes	Boats	Women	Men	Sailors
6	60	11	9	268	139	261	400

=== Continents ===
- Africa
- Asia
- Europe
- North America
- Oceania
- South America

=== Countries ===
During the 2004 Summer Olympics sixty-one countries competed in the Olympic sailing regattas. Australia, France, Italy, Great Britain, Greece, Spain and the USA were each present in all classes with a total of eighteen sailors (7 women and 11 men) per country.

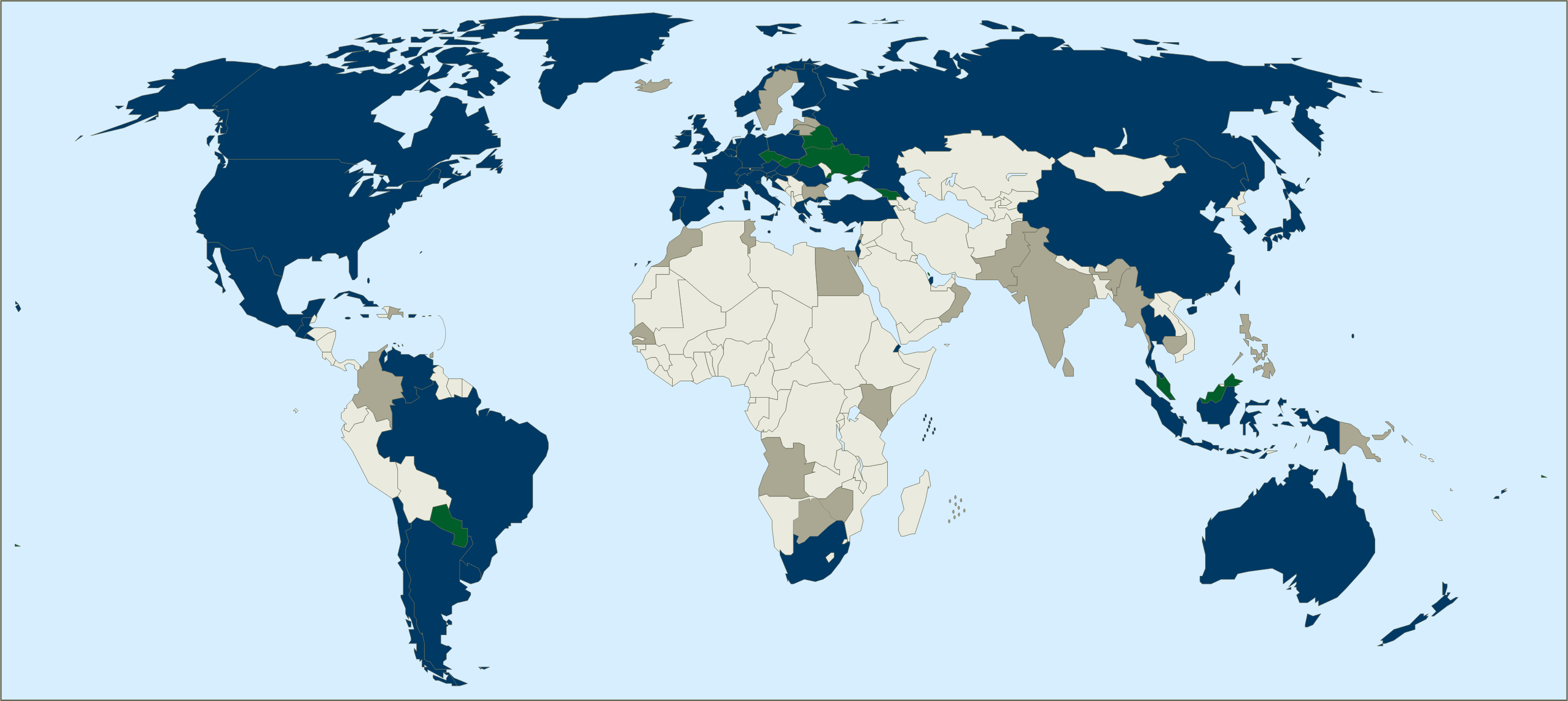
Countries that participated in the Sailing event of the 2004 Olympic Games. Blue: Water Gray: Never participated in OG Dark Gray: Participated in earlier OG Green: Country participated for the first time Dark Blue: Country participated also on previous games Red: Country boycotted the sailing event of the OG

Argentina	Australia	Austria	Belgium
Bermuda	Belarus	Brazil	Bahrain
Bulgaria	Canada	Chile	China
Croatia	Cyprus	Czech Republic	Denmark
Spain	Estonia	Finland	France
Great Britain	Germany	Greece	Hong Kong
Hungary	Indonesia	India	Ireland
Iceland	Israel	Virgin Islands	Italy
Japan	South Korea	Latvia	Lithuania
Malaysia	Mexico	Malta	Netherlands
Norway	New Zealand	Peru	Poland
Portugal	Puerto Rico	South Africa	Russia
Seychelles	Singapore	Slovenia	Switzerland
Slovakia	Sweden	Thailand	Tunisia
Turkey	Ukraine	Uruguay	United States
Venezuela

=== Classes (equipment) ===
Class	Type	Event	Sailors	Trapeze	Mainsail	Jib/Genoa	Spinnaker	First OG	Olympics so far
Europe	Dinghy		1	0	+	–	–	1992	4
Mistral One Design Class	Sailboard		1	0	+	–	–	1996	3
Mistral One Design Class	Sailboard		1	0	+	–	–	1996	3
Laser	Dinghy		1	0	+	–	–	1996	3
Finn	Dinghy		1	0	+	–	–	1952	14
470	Dinghy		2	1	+	+	+	1988	5
470	Dinghy		2	1	+	+	+	1976	8
49er	Dinghy		2	2	+	+	+	2000	2
Tornado	Multihull		2	2	+	+	+	1976	8
Yngling	Keelboat		3	0	+	+	+	2004	1
Star	Keelboat		2	0	+	+	-	1932	16

2004 Olympic Classes designs

== Race schedule ==
=== Schedule ===
Practice Race	Series Race	Res = Reserve Day

Schedule
Date	August																	
Date	7 Thu	8 Fri	9 Sat	10 Sun	11 Mon	12 Tue	13 Wed	14 Thu	15 Fri	16 Sat	17 Sun	18 Mon	19 Tue	20 Wed	21 Thu	22 Fri	23 Sat	24 Sun
Ceremony		●																●
Windsurfing Male Mistral	PR			S1,2	Res	S3,4	Res	S5,6	Res	S7,8	Res	S9,10	Res	S11				
Windsurfing Female Mistral	PR			S1,2	Res	S3,4	Res	S5,6	Res	S7,8	Res	S9,10	Res	S11				
One Person - Open - Laser			PR	S1,2	S3,4	S5,6	Res	S7,8	S9,10	Res	S11							
One Person - Male - Finn	PR		S1,2	S3,4	S5,6	Res	S7,8	S9,10	Res	S11								
One Person - Female - Europe			PR	S1,2	S3,4	S5,6	Res	S7,8	S9,10	Res	S11							
Two Person - Male - 470	PR		S1,2	S3,4	S5,6	Res	S7,8	S9,10	Res	S11								
Two Person - Female - 470	PR		S1,2	S3,4	S5,6	Res	S7,8	S9,10	Res	S11								
Two Person Skiff - Open - 49er			PR		S1,2,3	Res	S4,5,6	Res	S7,8,9	Res	S10,11,12	Res	S13,14,15	Res	S16			
Multihull - Open - Tornado									PR	S1,2	S3,4	S5,6	Res	S7,8	S9,10	Res	S11	
Keelboat Fleet - Male - Star									PR	S1,2	S3,4	S5,6	Res	S7,8	S9,10	Res	S11	
Keelboat Fleet - Female - Yngling	PR		S1,2	S3,4	S5,6	Res	S7,8	S9,10	Res	S11								

=== Actual Schedule ===
Every race was completed during the regatta with 11 races sailed by all classes except for the 49er which had 16.

Schedule
Date	August																	
Date	7 Thu	8 Fri	9 Sat	10 Sun	11 Mon	12 Tue	13 Wed	14 Thu	15 Fri	16 Sat	17 Sun	18 Mon	19 Tue	20 Wed	21 Thu	22 Fri	23 Sat	24 Sun
Ceremony		●																●
Windsurfing Male Mistral	PR	PR		S1			S2,3	S4	S5,6	S7,8	Res	S9,10	Res	S11				
Windsurfing Female Mistral	PR	PR		S1,2		S3	S4	S5	S6	S7,8		S9,10		S11				
One Person - Open - Laser	PR	PR		S1,2		S3,4	S5,6	S7,8	S9,10	Res	S11							
One Person - Male - Finn	PR	PR	S1,2	S3,4	S5,6	Res	S7,8	S9,10	Res	S11								
One Person - Female - Europe	PR	PR		S1,2		S3,4	S5,6	S7,8	S9,10	Res	S11							
Two Person - Male - 470	PR	PR	S1,2	S3,4	S5,6	Res	S7,8	S9,10	Res	S11								
Two Person - Female - 470	PR	PR	S1,2	S3,4	S5,6	Res	S7,8	S9,10	Res	S11								
Two Person Skiff - Open - 49er	PR	PR				S1	S2,3,4	S5,6	S7,8,9	Res	S10,11	S12	S13,14,15	Res	S16			
Multihull - Open - Tornado	PR	PR								S1,2	S3,4	S5,6	Res	S7,8	S9,10	Res	S11	
Keelboat Fleet - Male - Star	PR	PR								S1,2	S3,4	S5	S6	S7,8	S9,10	Res	S11	
Keelboat Fleet - Female - Yngling	PR	PR	S1,2	S3,4	S5,6	Res	S7,8	S9,10	Res	S11								

== Medal summary ==
=== Women's events ===
Games	Gold	Silver	Bronze
2004: Women's Mistral One Design	France (FRA); Faustine Merret	China (CHN); Yin Jian	Italy (ITA); Alessandra Sensini
2004: Europe	Norway (NOR); Siren Sundby	Czech Republic (CZE); Lenka Šmídová	Denmark (DEN); Signe Livbjerg
2004: Women's 470	Greece (GRE); Sofia Bekatorou; Aimilia Tsoulfa	Spain (ESP); Sandra Azón; Natalia Vía Dufresne	Sweden (SWE); Therese Torgersson; Vendela Zachrisson
2004: Yngling	Great Britain (GBR); Shirley Robertson; Sarah Webb; Sarah Ayton	Ukraine (UKR); Ruslana Taran; Ganna Kalinina; Svitlana Matevusheva	Denmark (DEN); Dorte Jensen; Helle Jespersen; Christina Otzen

=== Men's events ===
Games	Gold	Silver	Bronze
2004: Men's Mistral One Design	Israel (ISR); Gal Fridman	Greece (GRE); Nikolaos Kaklamanakis	Great Britain (GBR); Nick Dempsey
2004: Finn	Great Britain (GBR); Ben Ainslie	Spain (ESP); Rafael Trujillo	Poland (POL); Mateusz Kusznierewicz
2004: Men's 470	United States (USA); Paul Foerster; Kevin Burnham	Great Britain (GBR); Nick Rogers; Joe Glanfield	Japan (JPN); Kazuto Seki; Kenjiro Todoroki
2004: Star	Brazil (BRA); Torben Grael; Marcelo Ferreira	Canada (CAN); Ross MacDonald; Mike Wolfs	France (FRA); Pascal Rambeau; Xavier Rohart

=== Open events ===
Games	Gold	Silver	Bronze
2004: Laser	Brazil (BRA); Robert Scheidt	Austria (AUT); Andreas Geritzer	Slovenia (SLO); Vasilij Žbogar
2004: 49er	Spain (ESP); Iker Martínez; Xabier Fernández	Ukraine (UKR); Rodion Luka; George Leonchuk	Great Britain (GBR); Chris Draper; Simon Hiscocks
2004: Tornado	Austria (AUT); Roman Hagara; Hans-Peter Steinacher	United States (USA); John Lovell; Charlie Ogletree	Argentina (ARG); Santiago Lange; Carlos Espínola

== Medal table ==
Rank	Nation	Gold	Silver	Bronze	Total
1	Great Britain	2	1	2	5
2	Brazil	2	0	0	2
3	Spain	1	2	0	3
4	Austria	1	1	0	2
4	Greece	1	1	0	2
4	United States	1	1	0	2
7	France	1	0	1	2
8	Israel	1	0	0	1
8	Norway	1	0	0	1
10	Ukraine	0	2	0	2
11	Canada	0	1	0	1
11	China	0	1	0	1
11	Czech Republic	0	1	0	1
14	Denmark	0	0	2	2
15	Argentina	0	0	1	1
15	Italy	0	0	1	1
15	Japan	0	0	1	1
15	Poland	0	0	1	1
15	Slovenia	0	0	1	1
15	Sweden	0	0	1	1
Totals (20 entries)		11	11	11	33
