= Blandine (given name) =

- Gender: Female
- Name day: 2 June

Origin
- Origin: From the Roman name Blandina, which was the feminine form of Blandinus, derived from the Latin cognomen Blandus, meaning "charming"
- Meaning: "charming"
- Region of origin: France and francophone countries and areas

Other names
- Related names: Blanda, Blandina, Blandyna

Blandine is a predominantly French feminine given name derived from the Roman name Blandina, which was the feminine form of Blandinus, which is derived from the Latin cognomen Blandus, meaning "charming".

Notable individuals bearing the name Blandine include:

- Saint Blandine (162–177 AD), Christian martyr
- Blandine Bitzner-Ducret (born 1965), French track and field athlete
- Blandine Boulekone, Vanuatuan women's rights advocate
- Blandine Brocard (born 1981), French politician
- Blandine Dancette (born 1988), French handball player
- Blandine Ebinger (1899–1993), German actress and chansonniere
- Blandine Lachèze (born 1982), French pentathlete
- Blandine Maisonnier (born 1986), French heptathlete
- Blandine Merten (1883–1918), German Ursuline nun
- Blandine N'Goran (born 1987), Ivorian basketball player
- Blandine Rouille (born 1980), French yacht racer
- Blandine Verlet (1942–2018), French harpsichordist
- Blandine Rasoanamary Voizy, Malagasy politician
