= Denmark at the 2004 Summer Olympics =

- IOC code: DEN
- NOC: National Olympic Committee and Sports Confederation of Denmark
- Website: www.dif.dk (in Danish and English)

in Athens
- Competitors: 92 in 16 sports
- Flag bearer: Eskild Ebbesen
- Medals Ranked 37th: Gold 2 Silver 1 Bronze 5 Total 8

Summer Olympics appearances (overview)
- 1896; 1900; 1904; 1908; 1912; 1920; 1924; 1928; 1932; 1936; 1948; 1952; 1956; 1960; 1964; 1968; 1972; 1976; 1980; 1984; 1988; 1992; 1996; 2000; 2004; 2008; 2012; 2016; 2020; 2024

Other related appearances
- 1906 Intercalated Games

Denmark competed at the 2004 Summer Olympics in Athens, Greece, from 13 to 29 August 2004.

== Medalists ==
Medal	Name	Sport	Event	Date
Gold	Eskild Ebbesen; Thomas Ebert; Thor Kristensen; Stephan Mølvig	Rowing	Men's lightweight four	August 22
Gold	Denmark women's national handball team: Kristine Andersen; Karen Brødsgaard; Line Daugaard; Katrine Fruelund; Trine Jensen; Rikke Jørgensen; Lotte Kiærskou; Henriette Mikkelsen; Karin Mortensen; Louise Nørgaard; Rikke Schmidt; Rikke Skov; Camilla Thomsen; Josephine Touray; Mette Vestergaard	Handball	Women's tournament	August 29
Silver	Joachim Olsen	Athletics	Men's shot put	August 18
Bronze	Jens Eriksen; Mette Schjoldager	Badminton	Mixed doubles	August 19
Bronze	Dorte Jensen; Helle Jespersen; Christina Otzen	Sailing	Women's yngling class	August 21
Bronze	Michael Maze; Finn Tugwell	Table tennis	Men's doubles	August 21
Bronze	Signe Livbjerg	Sailing	Women's Europe class	August 22
Bronze	Wilson Kipketer	Athletics	Men's 800 metres	August 26

Medals by sport
Sport	1st place, gold medalist(s)	2nd place, silver medalist(s)	3rd place, bronze medalist(s)	Total
Handball	1	0	0	1
Rowing	1	0	0	1
Athletics	0	1	1	2
Sailing	0	0	2	2
Badminton	0	0	1	1
Table tennis	0	0	1	1
Total	2	1	5	8

== Archery ==
Denmark has qualified a spot in men's individual archery.

Athlete	Event	Ranking round		Round of 64	Round of 32	Round of 16	Quarterfinals	Semifinals	Final / BM	
Athlete	Event	Score	Seed	Opposition Score	Opposition Score	Opposition Score	Opposition Score	Opposition Score	Opposition Score	Rank
Hasse Pavia Lind	Men's individual	666	8	Essam (EGY); W 158–110	Serdyuk (UKR); L 164–165	Did not advance				

== Athletics ==
Danish athletes have so far achieved qualifying standards in the following athletics events (up to a maximum of 3 athletes in each event at the 'A' Standard, and 1 at the 'B' Standard). Joachim Olsen originally claimed a bronze medal in men's shot put. On 5 December 2012, the International Olympic Committee and the IAAF stripped off Ukrainian shot putter Yuriy Bilonoh's gold medal after drug re-testings of his samples were discovered positive. Following the announcement of Bilonoh's disqualification, Olsen's medal was upgraded to a silver.

Key

- Note–Ranks given for track events are within the athlete's heat only
- Q = Qualified for the next round
- q = Qualified for the next round as a fastest loser or, in field events, by position without achieving the qualifying target
- NR = National record
- N/A = Round not applicable for the event
- Bye = Athlete not required to compete in round

Men
Track & road events

Athlete	Event	Heat		Semifinal		Final	
Athlete	Event	Result	Rank	Result	Rank	Result	Rank
Wilson Kipketer	800 m	1:44.69	1 Q	1:44.63	1 Q	1:44.65	3rd place, bronze medalist(s)

Field events

Athlete	Event	Qualification		Final	
Athlete	Event	Distance	Position	Distance	Position
Piotr Buciarski	Pole vault	5.50	26	Did not advance	
Joachim Olsen	Shot put	20.78	2 Q	21.07	(silver)

Women
Track & road events

Athlete	Event	Final	
Athlete	Event	Result	Rank
Annemette Jensen	Marathon	2:50:01	49

Field events

Athlete	Event	Qualification		Final	
Athlete	Event	Distance	Position	Distance	Position
Christina Scherwin	Javelin throw	56.86	29	Did not advance	

== Badminton ==
Men

Athlete	Event	Round of 32	Round of 16	Quarterfinal	Semifinal	Final / BM	
Athlete	Event	Opposition Score	Opposition Score	Opposition Score	Opposition Score	Opposition Score	Rank
Peter Gade	Singles	Chien Y-H (TPE); W 15–6, 15–1	Kanetkar (IND); W 15–10, 15–6	Hidayat (INA); L 12–15, 12–15	Did not advance		
Kenneth Jonassen	Singles	Chen (CHN); L 15–12, 5–15, 9–15	Did not advance				
Jens Eriksen; Martin Lundgaard Hansen	Doubles	Bye	Bach / Han (USA); W 15–6, 15–4	Cai Y / Fu Hf (CHN); W 3–15, 15–11, 15–8	Lee D-S / Yoo Y-S (KOR); L 15–9, 5–15, 3–15	Hian / Limpele (INA); L 13–15, 7–15	4
Lars Paaske; Jonas Rasmussen	Doubles	Bye	Kim Y-H / Yim B-E (KOR); L 15–7, 6–15, 12–15	Did not advance			

Women

Athlete	Event	Round of 32	Round of 16	Quarterfinal	Semifinal	Final / BM	
Athlete	Event	Opposition Score	Opposition Score	Opposition Score	Opposition Score	Opposition Score	Rank
Camilla Martin	Singles	Yonekura (JPN); W 11–4, 11–7	Hallam (GBR); L 2–11, 11–5, 10–13	Did not advance			
Tine Rasmussen	Singles	Nedelcheva (BUL); L 11–8, 7–11, 11–13	Did not advance				
Pernille Harder; Mette Schjoldager	Doubles	Crabtree / Wilson-Smith (AUS); W 15–2, 15–3	Lee K-W / Ra K-M (KOR); L 8–15, 8–15	Did not advance			
Ann-Lou Jørgensen; Rikke Olsen	Doubles	Bye	Grether / Schenk (GER); W 15–12, 16–17, 15–5	Gao L / Huang S (CHN); L 6–15, 7–15	Did not advance		

Mixed

Athlete	Event	Round of 32	Round of 16	Quarterfinal	Semifinal	Final / BM	
Athlete	Event	Opposition Score	Opposition Score	Opposition Score	Opposition Score	Opposition Score	Rank
Jens Eriksen; Mette Schjoldager	Doubles	Stoyanov / Wright (FRA); W 15–13, 2–15, 15–5	Kim Y-H / Lee H-J (KOR); W 6–15, 15–12, 15–13	Marissa / Widianto (INA); W 15–12, 15–8	Gao L / Zhang J (CHN); L 9–15, 5–15	Olsen / Rasmussen (DEN); W 15–5, 15–5	3rd place, bronze medalist(s)
Rikke Olsen; Jonas Rasmussen	Doubles	Bye	Petersen / Shirley (NZL); W 15–14, 15–9	Kim D-M / Ra K-M (KOR); W 17–14, 15–8	Emms / Robertson (GBR); L 6–15, 12–15	Eriksen / Schjoldager (DEN); L 5–15, 5–15	4

== Canoeing ==
=== Sprint ===
Athlete	Event	Heats		Semifinals		Final	
Athlete	Event	Time	Rank	Time	Rank	Time	Rank
Lasse Nielsen; Mads Kongsgaard Madsen	Men's K-2 500 m	1:33.938	5 q	1:33.482	5	Did not advance	
Lasse Nielsen; Mads Kongsgaard Madsen	Men's K-2 1000 m	3:19.171	5 q	3:15.417	6	Did not advance	

Qualification Legend: Q = Qualify to final; q = Qualify to semifinal

== Cycling ==
=== Road ===
Athlete	Event	Time	Rank
Bo Hamburger	Men's road race	5:41:56	25
Frank Høj	Men's road race	5:41:56	8
Frank Høj	Men's time trial	1:00:35.73	18
Lars Michaelsen	Men's road race	5:50:35	55
Michael Rasmussen	Men's road race	DNF	
Nicki Sørensen	Men's road race	5:50:35	60

=== Mountain biking ===
Athlete	Event	Time	Rank
Peter Riis Andersen	Men's cross-country	2:24:03	18
Christian Poulsen	Men's cross-country	LAP (1 lap)	39
Mette Andersen	Women's cross-country	DNF	

== Equestrian ==
=== Dressage ===
Athlete	Horse	Event	Grand Prix		Grand Prix Special		Grand Prix Freestyle		Overall	
Athlete	Horse	Event	Score	Rank	Score	Rank	Score	Rank	Score	Rank
Andreas Helgstrand	Cavan	Individual	68.333	22 Q	73.960	10 Q	76.300	9	72.864	9
Lone Jørgensen	Ludewig G	Individual	65.750	38	Did not advance					
Jon Pedersen	Esprit de Valdemar	Individual	69.000	17 Q	69.160	19	Did not advance			
Per Sandgaard	Zancor	Individual	70.667	12 Q	71.560	11 Q	75.050	11	72.426	10
Andreas Helgstrand; Lone Jørgensen; Jon Pedersen; Per Sandgaard	See above	Team	—N/a						69.333	5

=== Show jumping ===
Athlete	Horse	Event	Qualification								Final					Total	
Athlete	Horse	Event	Round 1		Round 2			Round 3			Round A		Round B			Total	
Athlete	Horse	Event	Penalties	Rank	Penalties	Total	Rank	Penalties	Total	Rank	Penalties	Rank	Penalties	Total	Rank	Penalties	Rank
Thomas Velin	Carnute	Individual	0	=1	4	4	=5 Q	6	10	=10 Q	4	=4 Q	9	13	=11	13	=11

== Gymnastics ==
=== Trampoline ===
Athlete	Event	Qualification		Final	
Athlete	Event	Score	Rank	Score	Rank
Peter Jensen	Men's	32.70	16	Did not advance	

== Handball ==
=== Women's tournament ===
Roster

The following is the Denmark roster in the women's handball tournament of the 2004 Summer Olympics.

Head coaches: Jan Pytlick

No.	Pos.	Name	Date of birth (age)	Height	App.	Goals	Club
1	GK	Louise Nørgaard	23 April 1982 (aged 22)	1.83 m			(Denmark) Viborg HK
2	LB	Rikke Skov	7 September 1980 (aged 23)	1.81 m			(Denmark) Viborg HK
3	LW	Henriette Mikkelsen	21 September 1980 (aged 23)	1.66 m			(Denmark) Viborg HK
5	RB	Mette Vestergaard	19 November 1975 (aged 28)	1.72 m			(Denmark) FC Copenhagen
10	CB	Rikke Jørgensen	2 May 1976 (aged 28)	1.71 m			(Denmark) Slagelse FH
11	P	Camilla Ingemann Thomsen	19 November 1974 (aged 29)	1.80 m			(Denmark) FC Copenhagen
12	GK	Karin Mortensen	26 September 1977 (aged 26)	1.82 m			(Denmark) Ikast/Bording EH
13	CB	Lotte Kiærskou	23 June 1975 (aged 29)	1.78 m			(Denmark) Viborg HK
14	RB	Trine Jensen	16 October 1980 (aged 23)	1.76 m			(Denmark) Aalborg DH
15	LB	Katrine Fruelund	12 July 1978 (aged 26)	1.74 m			(Denmark) Viborg HK
16	GK	Rikke Schmidt	14 January 1975 (aged 29)	1.84 m			(Denmark) Slagelse FH
17	CB	Kristine Andersen	2 April 1976 (aged 28)	1.72 m			(Denmark) Ikast/Bording EH
18	P	Karen Brødsgaard	10 March 1978 (aged 26)	1.78 m			(Denmark) Ikast/Bording EH
19	LW	Line Daugaard	17 July 1978 (aged 26)	1.72 m			(Denmark) Ikast/Bording EH
21	RW	Josephine Touray	6 October 1979 (aged 24)	1.65 m			(Denmark) Ikast/Bording EH

Group play

Pos	Team	Pld	W	D	L	GF	GA	GD	Pts	Qualification
1	South Korea	4	3	1	0	135	103	+32	7 (Note: South Korea 29–29 Denmark)	Quarterfinals
2	Denmark	4	3	1	0	125	98	+27	7	Quarterfinals
3	France	4	2	0	2	105	106	−1	4	Quarterfinals
4	Spain	4	0	1	3	86	110	−24	1 (Note: Spain 24–24 Angola)	Quarterfinals
5	Angola	4	0	1	3	97	131	−34	1	

Rules for classification: 1) Points; 2) Head-to-head points; 3) Head-to-head goal difference; 4) Head-to-head goals scored; 5) Goal difference; 6) Goals scored; 7) Draw.
Notes:

15 August 2004; 21:30	Denmark	35–26	France	Sports Pavilion, Athens; Referees: Pozeznik, Repensek (SLO)
15 August 2004; 21:30	Brødsgaard 8	(16–11)	Cendier Ajaguin, Pecqueux-Rolland 4	Sports Pavilion, Athens; Referees: Pozeznik, Repensek (SLO)
15 August 2004; 21:30	4× (yellow card) 3× (suspension)		2× (yellow card) 3× (suspension)	Sports Pavilion, Athens; Referees: Pozeznik, Repensek (SLO)

17 August 2004; 19:30	South Korea	29–29	Denmark	Sports Pavilion, Athens; Referees: Bavas, Migas (GRE)
17 August 2004; 19:30	Woo 8	(14–13)	Kiærskou, Fruelund 7	Sports Pavilion, Athens; Referees: Bavas, Migas (GRE)
17 August 2004; 19:30	3× (yellow card) 7× (suspension)		3× (yellow card) 3× (suspension)	Sports Pavilion, Athens; Referees: Bavas, Migas (GRE)

19 August 2004; 21:30	Spain	21–23	Denmark	Sports Pavilion, Athens; Referees: Hassan, Aly (EGY)
19 August 2004; 21:30	Mangue 6	(8–14)	Thomsen, Andersen 4	Sports Pavilion, Athens; Referees: Hassan, Aly (EGY)
19 August 2004; 21:30	3× (yellow card) 5× (suspension)		4× (yellow card) 1× (suspension)	Sports Pavilion, Athens; Referees: Hassan, Aly (EGY)

23 August 2004; 21:30	Denmark	38–22	Angola	Sports Pavilion, Athens; Referees: Bavas, Migas (GRE)
23 August 2004; 21:30	Daugaard 7	(19–8)	Bengue 8	Sports Pavilion, Athens; Referees: Bavas, Migas (GRE)
23 August 2004; 21:30	3× (yellow card) 2× (suspension)		3× (yellow card) 5× (suspension)	Sports Pavilion, Athens; Referees: Bavas, Migas (GRE)

Quarterfinal

26 August 2004; 21:30	China	28–32	Denmark	Helliniko Indoor Arena; Referees: Pozeznik, Repensek (SLO)
26 August 2004; 21:30	Wang Shasha 7	(14–18)	Fruelund 7	Helliniko Indoor Arena; Referees: Pozeznik, Repensek (SLO)
26 August 2004; 21:30	4× (yellow card) 5× (suspension)		2× (yellow card) 3× (suspension)	Helliniko Indoor Arena; Referees: Pozeznik, Repensek (SLO)

Semifinal

27 August 2004; 21:30	Ukraine	20–29	Denmark	Helliniko Indoor Arena; Referees: Lemme, Ullrich (GER)
27 August 2004; 21:30	Lyapina 5	(11–13)	Fruelund 9	Helliniko Indoor Arena; Referees: Lemme, Ullrich (GER)
27 August 2004; 21:30	4× (yellow card) 4× (suspension)		3× (yellow card) 2× (suspension)	Helliniko Indoor Arena; Referees: Lemme, Ullrich (GER)

Gold Medal Final

29 August 2004
10:45
Denmark
38–36 (ET)
South Korea
Helliniko Indoor Arena
Referees: Baum, Goralczyk (POL)
Fruelund 15
(14–14)
Lee S 9
3× (yellow card) 1× (suspension)

4× (yellow card) 4× (suspension)

FT: 25–25 ET: 29–29, 34–34

Won Gold Medal

== Rowing ==
Men

Athlete	Event	Heats		Repechage		Semifinals		Final	
Athlete	Event	Time	Rank	Time	Rank	Time	Rank	Time	Rank
Rasmus Quist Hansen; Mads Rasmussen	Lightweight double sculls	6:17.68	1 SA/B	Bye		6:17.85	3 FA	6:23.92	4
Eskild Ebbesen; Thomas Ebert; Thor Kristensen; Stephan Mølvig	Lightweight four	5:50.72	1 SA/B	Bye		5:55.85	1 FA	5:56.85	1st place, gold medalist(s)

Women

Athlete	Event	Heats		Repechage		Semifinals		Final	
Athlete	Event	Time	Rank	Time	Rank	Time	Rank	Time	Rank
Juliane Rasmussen; Johanne Thomsen	Lightweight double sculls	6:56.62	3 R	6:57.84	3 SA/B	7:01.98	5 FB	7:32.58	10
Sarah Lauritzen; Majbrit Nielsen; Dorthe Pedersen; Christina Rindom	Quadruple sculls	6:28.16	4 R	6:25.14	5 FB	—N/a		6:50.13	6

Qualification Legend: FA=Final A (medal); FB=Final B (non-medal); FC=Final C (non-medal); FD=Final D (non-medal); FE=Final E (non-medal); FF=Final F (non-medal); SA/B=Semifinals A/B; SC/D=Semifinals C/D; SE/F=Semifinals E/F; R=Repechage

== Sailing ==
Men

Athlete	Event	Race											Net points	Final rank
Athlete	Event	1	2	3	4	5	6	7	8	9	10	M*	Net points	Final rank
Jonas Høgh-Christensen	Finn	16	4	23	~~DNF~~	1	8	11	13	10	8	11	105	9
Kristian Kjærgaard; Mads Møller	470	23	9	22	13	~~DSQ~~	15	25	22	17	27	18	191	25
Nicklas Holm; Claus Olesen	Star	14	12	2	2	11	7	5	~~17~~	16	14	10	83	9

Women

Athlete	Event	Race											Net points	Final rank
Athlete	Event	1	2	3	4	5	6	7	8	9	10	M*	Net points	Final rank
Signe Livbjerg	Europe	4	6	7	15	8	6	10	3	11	4	~~25~~	74	3rd place, bronze medalist(s)
Michaela Meehan; Susanne Ward	470	11	1	4	3	13	8	5	16	12	~~RAF~~	16	89	6
Dorte Jensen; Helle Jespersen; Christina Otzen	Yngling	1	14	5	5	5	6	3	4	6	5	~~OCS~~	54	3rd place, bronze medalist(s)

Open

Athlete	Event	Race																Net points	Final rank
Athlete	Event	1	2	3	4	5	6	7	8	9	10	11	12	13	14	15	M*	Net points	Final rank
Anders Nyholm	Laser	16	~~30~~	12	18	20	27	25	18	21	26	—N/a					20	203	22
Dennis Dengsø Andersen; Michael Hestbæk	49er	16	~~17~~	~~17~~	10	7	11	3	15	6	7	17	1	15	6	11	13	138	13

M = Medal race; OCS = On course side of the starting line; DSQ = Disqualified; DNF = Did not finish; DNS= Did not start; RDG = Redress given

== Shooting ==
Men

Athlete	Event	Qualification		Final	
Athlete	Event	Points	Rank	Points	Rank
Torben Grimmel	50 m rifle prone	594	=9	Did not advance	
Michael Nielsen	Skeet	122 (1)	7	Did not advance	
Peter Thuesen	10 m air rifle	589	=29	Did not advance	

Women

Athlete	Event	Qualification		Final	
Athlete	Event	Points	Rank	Points	Rank
Susanne Meyerhoff	10 m air pistol	329	=21	Did not advance	
Ann Spejlsgaard	10 m air rifle	388	=33	Did not advance	

== Swimming ==
Danish swimmers earned qualifying standards in the following events (up to a maximum of 2 swimmers in each event at the A-standard time, and 1 at the B-standard time):

Men

Athlete	Event	Heat		Semifinal		Final	
Athlete	Event	Time	Rank	Time	Rank	Time	Rank
Jacob Carstensen	200 m freestyle	1:50.15	18	Did not advance			
Jacob Carstensen	400 m freestyle	3:51.09	15	—N/a		Did not advance	
Jacob Carstensen	200 m individual medley	2:04.80	31	Did not advance			

Women

Athlete	Event	Heat		Semifinal		Final	
Athlete	Event	Time	Rank	Time	Rank	Time	Rank
Mette Jacobsen	100 m butterfly	59.81	15 Q	59.72	15	Did not advance	
Mette Jacobsen	200 m butterfly	2:11.99	13 Q	2:10.47	8 Q	2:10.01	6
Louise Mai Jansen	200 m freestyle	2:06.06	37	Did not advance			
Louise Mai Jansen	200 m individual medley	2:27.08	30	Did not advance			
Louise Ørnstedt	100 m backstroke	1:01.17	13 Q	1:01.12	4 Q	1:01.51	7
Louise Ørnstedt	200 m backstroke	2:13.05	7 Q	2:11.77	6 Q	2:11.15 NR	6
Jeanette Ottesen	50 m freestyle	25.95	22	Did not advance			
Jeanette Ottesen	100 m freestyle	56.17	18	Did not advance			
Majken Thorup	100 m breaststroke	1:10.97	19	Did not advance			
Majken Thorup	200 m breaststroke	2:35.29	25	Did not advance			
Mette Jacobsen; Louise Ørnstedt; Jeanette Ottesen; Majken Thorup	4 × 100 m medley relay	4:08.89	9	—N/a		Did not advance	

== Table tennis ==
Athlete	Event	Round 1	Round 2	Round 3	Round 4	Quarterfinals	Semifinals	Final / BM	
Athlete	Event	Opposition Result	Opposition Result	Opposition Result	Opposition Result	Opposition Result	Opposition Result	Opposition Result	Rank
Michael Maze	Men's singles	Bye		Leung C Y (HKG); L 1–4	Did not advance				
Michael Maze; Finn Tugwell	Men's doubles	—N/a	Bye	Akinlabi / Nosiru (NGR); W 4–2	Jindrak / Schlager (AUT); W 4–0	Persson / Waldner (SWE); W 4–1	Chen Q / Ma L (CHN); L 2–4	Mazunov / Smirnov (RUS); W 4–2	3rd place, bronze medalist(s)

== Taekwondo ==
Athlete	Event	Round of 16	Quarterfinals	Semifinals	Repechage 1	Repechage 2	Final / BM	
Athlete	Event	Opposition Result	Opposition Result	Opposition Result	Opposition Result	Opposition Result	Opposition Result	Rank
Jesper Roesen	Men's −68 kg	Hernando (ARG); W 11–10	Song M-S (KOR); L 11–13	Did not advance				
Zakaria Asidah	Men's +80 kg	Kamal (JOR); L 6–9	Did not advance					

== Triathlon ==
Denmark has qualified a single triathlete.

Athlete	Event	Swim (1.5 km)	Trans 1	Bike (40 km)	Trans 2	Run (10 km)	Total Time	Rank
Rasmus Henning	Men's	18:19	0:16	1:01.29	0:17	32:49	1:52:37.32	7

== Wrestling ==
Key:

- VT – Victory by Fall.
- PP – Decision by Points – the loser with technical points.
- PO – Decision by Points – the loser without technical points.

Men's Greco-Roman

Athlete	Event	Elimination Pool				Quarterfinal	Semifinal	Final / BM	
Athlete	Event	Opposition Result	Opposition Result	Opposition Result	Rank	Opposition Result	Opposition Result	Opposition Result	Rank
Håkan Nyblom	−55kg	Kiouregkian (GRE); L 0–3 ^{PO}	Sheng J (CHN); W 3–1 ^{PP}	Kalilov (KGZ); W 3–0 ^{PO}	2	Did not advance			8

== See also ==
- Denmark at the 2004 Summer Paralympics
