= Sailing at the 2004 Summer Olympics – Men's 470 =

Men's 470 at the Games of the XXVIII Olympiad
- Line drawing of the 470
- Venue: Agios Kosmas Olympic Sailing Centre
- Dates: First race: 14 August 2004; Last race: 21 August 2004
- Competitors: 54 from 27 nations
- Teams: 27

Medalists
1st place, gold medalist(s)		Paul Foerster; Kevin Burnham	United States
2nd place, silver medalist(s)		Nick Rogers; Joe Glanfield	Great Britain
3rd place, bronze medalist(s)		Kazuto Seki; Kenjiro Todoroki	Japan

The Men's 470 was a sailing event on the Sailing at the 2004 Summer Olympics program in Agios Kosmas Olympic Sailing Centre, in the 470 dinghy. Eleven races were scheduled and completed. 54 sailors, on 27 boats, from 27 nation competed.

== Race schedule ==
●	Practice races	●	Competition day	●	Last day of racing

Date	August																	
Date	12 Thu	13 Fri	14 Sat	15 Sun	16 Mon	17 Tue	18 Wed	19 Thu	20 Fri	21 Sat	22 Sun	23 Mon	24 Tue	25 Wed	26 Thu	27 Fri	28 Sat	29 Sun
Men's 470	●	●	● ●	● ●	Spare day	● ●	● ●	● ●	Spare day	●								

== Final results ==
Rank	Country	Helmsman	Crew	Race 1		Race 2		Race 3		Race 4		Race 5		Race 6		Race 7		Race 8		Race 9		Race 10		Race 11		Total	Total – discard
Rank	Country	Helmsman	Crew	Pos.	Pts.	Pos.	Pts.	Pos.	Pts.	Pos.	Pts.	Pos.	Pts.	Pos.	Pts.	Pos.	Pts.	Pos.	Pts.	Pos.	Pts.	Pos.	Pts.	Pos.	Pts.	Total	Total – discard
1st place, gold medalist(s)	United States	Paul Foerster	Kevin Burnham	1	1.0	8	8.0	2	2.0	15	15.0	9	9.0	4	4.0	3	3.0	7	7.0	18	18.0	4	4.0	~~22~~	~~22.0~~	93.0	71.0
2nd place, silver medalist(s)	Great Britain	Nick Rogers	Joe Glanfield	2	2.0	3	3.0	9	9.0	4	4.0	17	17.0	5	5.0	2	2.0	3	3.0	10	10.0	19	19.0	~~23~~	~~23.0~~	97.0	74.0
3rd place, bronze medalist(s)	Japan	Kazuto Seki	Kenjiro Todoroki	3	3.0	7	7.0	~~21~~	~~21.0~~	18	18.0	7	7.0	12	12.0	1	1.0	9	9.0	5	5.0	17	17.0	11	11.0	111.0	90.0
4	Sweden	Johan Molund	Martin Andersson	18	18.0	15	15.0	8	8.0	~~22~~	~~22.0~~	1	1.0	16	16.0	12	12.0	4	4.0	2	2.0	3	3.0	15	15.0	116.0	94.0
5	France	Gildas Philippe	Nicolas le Berre	14	14.0	2	2.0	13	13.0	7	7.0	2	2.0	~~17~~	~~17.0~~	15	15.0	17	17.0	12	12.0	13	13.0	2	2.0	114.0	97.0
6	Netherlands	Sven Coster	Kalle Coster	4	4.0	21	21.0	4	4.0	16	16.0	12	12.0	18	18.0	6	6.0	8	8.0	6	6.0	~~22~~	~~22.0~~	6	6.0	123.0	101.0
7	Portugal	Álvaro Marinho	Miguel Nunes	~~22~~	~~22.0~~	5	5.0	20	20.0	21	21.0	10	10.0	8	8.0	9	9.0	1	1.0	20	20.0	1	1.0	8	8.0	125.0	103.0
8	Brazil	Alexandre Paradeda	Bernardo Arndt	5	5.0	1	1.0	14	14.0	19	19.0	4	4.0	10	10.0	17	17.0	20	20.0	~~24~~	~~24.0~~	9	9.0	5	5.0	128.0	104.0
9	Ukraine	Yevhen Braslavets	Ihor Matviyenko	10	10.0	4	4.0	1	1.0	~~DNF~~	~~28.0~~	8	8.0	7	7.0	18	18.0	12	12.0	13	13.0	24	24.0	9	9.0	134.0	106.0
10	Italy	Gabrio Zandonà	Andrea Trani	21	21.0	~~23~~	~~23.0~~	7	7.0	12	12.0	11	11.0	22	22.0	13	13.0	5	5.0	7	7.0	8	8.0	3	3.0	132.0	109.0
11	Germany	Lucas Zellmer	Felix Krabbe	17	17.0	16	16.0	10	10.0	11	11.0	5	5.0	19	19.0	10	10.0	~~23~~	~~23.0~~	8	8.0	11	11.0	7	7.0	137.0	114.0
12	Australia	Nathan Wilmot	Malcolm Page	12	12.0	~~DSQ~~	~~28.0~~	3	3.0	3	3.0	19	19.0	3	3.0	4	4.0	18	18.0	3	3.0	26	26.0	OCS	28.0	147.0	119.0
13	Argentina	Javier Conte	Juan de la Fuente	~~26~~	~~26.0~~	20	20.0	5	5.0	1	1.0	21	21.0	1	1.0	11	11.0	13	13.0	9	9.0	23	23.0	17	17.0	147.0	121.0
14	Slovenia	Tomaž Čopi	Davor Glavina	13	13.0	13	13.0	17	17.0	6	6.0	15	15.0	~~20~~	~~20.0~~	8	8.0	19	19.0	15	15.0	6	6.0	14	14.0	146.0	126.0
15	Israel	Gideon Kliger	Udi Gal	19	19.0	12	12.0	6	6.0	8	8.0	23	23.0	9	9.0	5	5.0	11	11.0	23	23.0	12	12.0	~~DSQ~~	~~28.0~~	156.0	128.0
16	Ireland	Gerald Owens	Ross Killian	11	11.0	14	14.0	16	16.0	14	14.0	14	14.0	14	14.0	~~19~~	~~19.0~~	16	16.0	4	4.0	16	16.0	10	10.0	148.0	129.0
17	Russia	Dmitry Berezkin	Mikhail Krutikov	8	8.0	17	17.0	~~26~~	~~26.0~~	17	17.0	18	18.0	21	21.0	16	16.0	6	6.0	14	14.0	14	14.0	1	1.0	158.0	132.0
18	Greece	Andreas Kosmatopoulos	Konstantinos Trigkonis	9	9.0	6	6.0	11	11.0	9	9.0	16	16.0	2	2.0	23	23.0	15	15.0	21	21.0	20	20.0	~~OCS~~	~~28.0~~	160.0	132.0
19	Croatia	Tomislav Bašić	Petar Cupać	16	16.0	10	10.0	19	19.0	5	5.0	20	20.0	~~26~~	~~26.0~~	21	21.0	25	25.0	1	1.0	7	7.0	12	12.0	162.0	136.0
20	Spain	Gustavo Martinez	Dimas Wood	7	7.0	22	22.0	12	12.0	10	10.0	3	3.0	11	11.0	26	26.0	21	21.0	16	16.0	10	10.0	~~OCS~~	~~28.0~~	166.0	138.0
21	Poland	Tomasz Stańczyk	Tomasz Jakubiak	24	24.0	11	11.0	~~25~~	~~25.0~~	2	2.0	13	13.0	25	25.0	7	7.0	14	14.0	22	22.0	18	18.0	21	21.0	182.0	157.0
22	Switzerland	Lukas Erni	Simon Brügger	20	20.0	25	25.0	18	18.0	20	20.0	6	6.0	24	24.0	20	20.0	~~27~~	~~27.0~~	11	11.0	15	15.0	4	4.0	190.0	163.0
23	South Korea	Kim Dae-young	Jung Sung-ahn	6	6.0	19	19.0	24	24.0	25	25.0	26	26.0	27	27.0	24	24.0	2	2.0	~~OCS~~	~~28.0~~	2	2.0	16	16.0	199.0	171.0
24	Turkey	Selim Kakış	Hasan Kaan Özgönenç	25	25.0	18	18.0	15	15.0	24	24.0	25	25.0	6	6.0	~~DSQ~~	~~28.0~~	24	24.0	19	19.0	5	5.0	13	13.0	202.0	174.0
25	Denmark	Kristian Skjødt Kjærgaard	Mads Møller Hansen	23	23.0	9	9.0	22	22.0	13	13.0	~~DSQ~~	~~28.0~~	15	15.0	25	25.0	22	22.0	17	17.0	27	27.0	18	18.0	219.0	191.0
26	New Zealand	Andrew Brown	Jamie Hunt	~~27~~	~~27.0~~	24	24.0	23	23.0	23	23.0	22	22.0	13	13.0	14	14.0	10	10.0	26	26.0	25	25.0	20	20.0	227.0	200.0
27	Hungary	Péter Czégai	Csaba Cserép	15	15.0	26	26.0	27	27.0	~~DNF~~	~~28.0~~	24	24.0	23	23.0	22	22.0	26	26.0	25	25.0	21	21.0	19	19.0	256.0	228.0

Legend: DSQ – Disqualified; OCS – On the course side of the starting line;
Discard is crossed out and does not count for the overall result.

== Daily standings ==
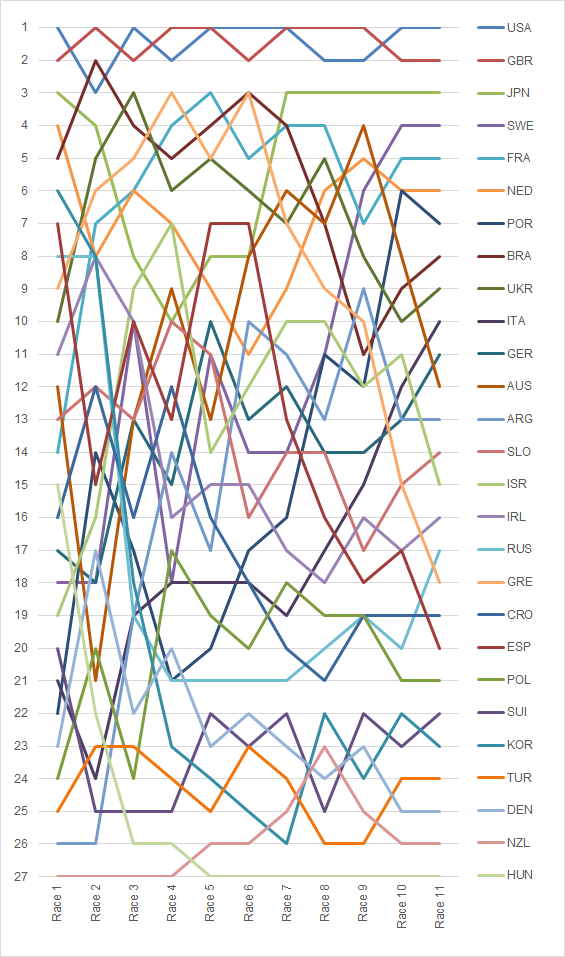
Graph showing the daily standings in the Men's 470 during the 2004 Summer Olympics
