= Sailing at the 2004 Summer Olympics – Women's 470 =

Women's 470 at the Games of the XXVIII Olympiad
- Line drawing of the 470
- Venue: Agios Kosmas Olympic Sailing Centre
- Dates: First race: 14 August 2004; Last race: 21 August 2004
- Competitors: 40 from 20 nations

Medalists
1st place, gold medalist(s)		Sofia Bekatorou; Aimilia Tsoulfa	Greece
2nd place, silver medalist(s)		Sandra Azón; Natalia Vía Dufresne	Spain
3rd place, bronze medalist(s)		Therese Torgersson; Vendela Zachrisson	Sweden

The Women's 470 was a sailing event on the Sailing at the 2004 Summer Olympics program in Agios Kosmas Olympic Sailing Centre, in the 470 dinghy. Eleven races were scheduled and completed with one discard. 40 sailors, on 20 boats, from 20 nation competed.

== Race schedule ==
●	Practice races	●	Competition day	●	Last day of racing

Date	August																	
Date	12 Thu	13 Fri	14 Sat	15 Sun	16 Mon	17 Tue	18 Wed	19 Thu	20 Fri	21 Sat	22 Sun	23 Mon	24 Tue	25 Wed	26 Thu	27 Fri	28 Sat	29 Sun
Women's 470	●	●	● ●	● ●	Spare day	● ●	● ●	● ●	Spare day	●								

== Final results ==
Rank	Country	Helmsman	Crew	Race 1		Race 2		Race 3		Race 4		Race 5		Race 6		Race 7		Race 8		Race 9		Race 10		Race 11		Total	Total – discard
Rank	Country	Helmsman	Crew	Pos.	Pts.	Pos.	Pts.	Pos.	Pts.	Pos.	Pts.	Pos.	Pts.	Pos.	Pts.	Pos.	Pts.	Pos.	Pts.	Pos.	Pts.	Pos.	Pts.	Pos.	Pts.	Total	Total – discard
1st place, gold medalist(s)	Greece	Sofia Bekatorou	Aimilia Tsoulfa	1	1.0	2	2.0	2	2.0	13	13.0	1	1.0	1	1.0	14	14.0	1	1.0	1	1.0	2	2.0	~~DNC~~	~~21.0~~	59.0	38.0
2nd place, silver medalist(s)	Spain	Sandra Azón	Natalia Vía Dufresne	2	2.0	4	4.0	9	9.0	15	15.0	~~19~~	~~19.0~~	5	5.0	8	8.0	3	3.0	5	5.0	6	6.0	5	5.0	81.0	62.0
3rd place, bronze medalist(s)	Sweden	Therese Torgersson	Vendela Zachrisson	9	9.0	10	10.0	7	7.0	2	2.0	3	3.0	~~14~~	~~14.0~~	9	9.0	6	6.0	7	7.0	7	7.0	3	3.0	77.0	63.0
4	Slovenia	Vesna Dekleva	Klara Maučec	3	3.0	5	5.0	14	14.0	~~18~~	~~18.0~~	2	2.0	15	15.0	1	1.0	2	2.0	18	18.0	3	3.0	2	2.0	83.0	65.0
5	United States	Katie McDowell	Isabelle Kinsolving	12	12.0	16	16.0	3	3.0	12	12.0	9	9.0	2	2.0	~~18~~	~~18.0~~	17	17.0	8	8.0	1	1.0	4	4.0	102.0	84.0
6	Denmark	Susanne Ward	Michaela Meehan	11	11.0	1	1.0	4	4.0	3	3.0	13	13.0	8	8.0	5	5.0	16	16.0	12	12.0	~~DSQ~~	~~21.0~~	16	16.0	110.0	89.0
7	Great Britain	Christina Bassadone	Katherine Hopson	5	5.0	14	14.0	15	15.0	4	4.0	5	5.0	6	6.0	17	17.0	~~DSQ~~	~~21.0~~	2	2.0	16	16.0	7	7.0	112.0	91.0
8	Russia	Vlada Ilyenko	Nataliya Gaponovich	7	7.0	6	6.0	12	12.0	8	8.0	14	14.0	~~17~~	~~17.0~~	13	13.0	11	11.0	11	11.0	4	4.0	8	8.0	111.0	94.0
9	Netherlands	Lisa Westerhof	Margriet Matthijsse	10	10.0	~~DSQ~~	~~21.0~~	1	1.0	RDG	15.0	4	4.0	10	10.0	7	7.0	7	7.0	19	19.0	12	12.0	15	15.0	121.0	100.0
10	France	Ingrid Petitjean	Nadège Douroux	8	8.0	3	3.0	5	5.0	7	7.0	7	7.0	~~20~~	~~20.0~~	19	19.0	18	18.0	10	10.0	14	14.0	9	9.0	120.0	100.0
11	Japan	Yuka Yoshisako	Mitsuko Satake	~~DSQ~~	~~21.0~~	17	17.0	16	16.0	10	10.0	8	8.0	12	12.0	4	4.0	12	12.0	3	3.0	18	18.0	1	1.0	122.0	101.0
12	Argentina	María Fernanda Sesto	Paula Reinoso	15	15.0	7	7.0	11	11.0	6	6.0	15	15.0	~~16~~	~~16.0~~	3	3.0	14	14.0	9	9.0	11	11.0	11	11.0	118.0	102.0
13	Canada	Jen Provan	Nikola Girke	4	4.0	13	13.0	17	17.0	11	11.0	12	12.0	7	7.0	2	2.0	~~19~~	~~19.0~~	6	6.0	19	19.0	12	12.0	122.0	103.0
14	Australia	Jenny Armstrong	Belinda Stowell	14	14.0	12	12.0	6	6.0	14	14.0	11	11.0	11	11.0	10	10.0	8	8.0	13	13.0	9	9.0	~~19~~	~~19.0~~	127.0	108.0
15	Germany	Stefanie Rothweiler	Monika Leu	13	13.0	15	15.0	8	8.0	1	1.0	18	18.0	4	4.0	11	11.0	10	10.0	~~20~~	~~20.0~~	15	15.0	14	14.0	129.0	109.0
16	New Zealand	Shelley Hesson	Linda Dickson	6	6.0	8	8.0	10	10.0	5	5.0	17	17.0	~~18~~	~~18.0~~	15	15.0	13	13.0	14	14.0	17	17.0	13	13.0	136.0	118.0
17	Brazil	Fernanda Oliveira	Adriana Kostiw	~~OCS~~	~~21.0~~	18	18.0	19	19.0	16	16.0	16	16.0	3	3.0	6	6.0	15	15.0	15	15.0	5	5.0	6	6.0	140.0	119.0
18	Israel	Nike Kornecki	Vered Buskila	~~OCS~~	~~21.0~~	11	11.0	RAF	21.0	19	19.0	6	6.0	13	13.0	12	12.0	5	5.0	4	4.0	13	13.0	18	18.0	143.0	122.0
19	Hungary	Márta Weöres	Anna Payr	~~OCS~~	~~21.0~~	9	9.0	13	13.0	9	9.0	20	20.0	9	9.0	16	16.0	9	9.0	16	16.0	10	10.0	17	17.0	149.0	128.0
20	Italy	Elisabetta Saccheggiani	Myriam Cutolo	16	16.0	19	19.0	18	18.0	~~20~~	~~20.0~~	10	10.0	19	19.0	20	20.0	4	4.0	17	17.0	8	8.0	10	10.0	161.0	141.0

Legend: DNC – Did not come to the starting area; DSQ – Disqualified; OCS – On the course side of the starting line; RDG – Redress given;
Discard is crossed out and does not count for the overall result.

== Daily standings ==
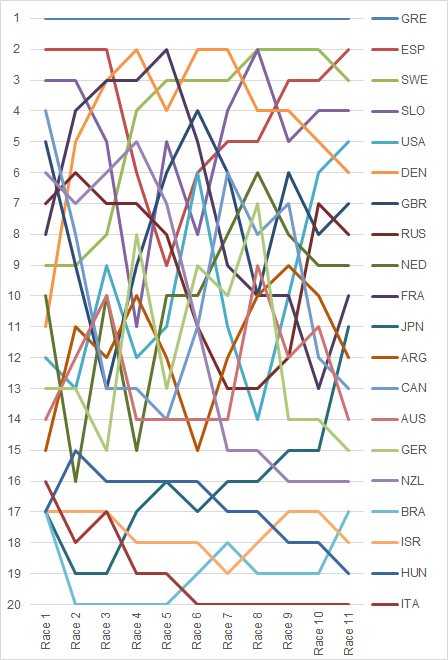
Graph showing the daily standings in the Women's 470 at the 2004 Summer Olympics
