= Sailing at the 2004 Summer Olympics – Europe =

Europe at the Games of the XXVIII Olympiad
- Line drawing of the Europe
- Venue: Agios Kosmas Olympic Sailing Centre
- Dates: First race: 15 August 2004; Last race: 22 August 2004
- Competitors: 25 from 25 nations

Medalists
1st place, gold medalist(s)		Siren Sundby	Norway
2nd place, silver medalist(s)		Lenka Šmídová	Czech Republic
3rd place, bronze medalist(s)		Signe Livbjerg	Denmark

The Women's Europe was a sailing event on the Sailing at the 2004 Summer Olympics program in Agios Kosmas Olympic Sailing Centre. Eleven races were scheduled and completed with one discard. 25 sailors, on 25 boats, from 25 nation competed.

== Race schedule ==
Practice Race	Series Race	Res = Reserve Day

Date	August																	
Date	12 Thu	13 Fri	14 Sat	15 Sun	16 Mon	17 Tue	18 Wed	19 Thu	20 Fri	21 Sat	22 Sun	23 Mon	24 Tue	25 Wed	26 Thu	27 Fri	28 Sat	29 Sun
Actual	PR	PR		S1,2		S3,4	S5,6	S7,8	S9,10	Res	S11							
Scheduled			PR	S1,2	S3,4	S5,6	Res	S7,8	S9,10	Res	S11							

== Final results ==
Rank	Country	Helmsman	Race 1		Race 2		Race 3		Race 4		Race 5		Race 6		Race 7		Race 8		Race 9		Race 10		Race 11		Total	Total – discard
Rank	Country	Helmsman	Pos.	Pts.	Pos.	Pts.	Pos.	Pts.	Pos.	Pts.	Pos.	Pts.	Pos.	Pts.	Pos.	Pts.	Pos.	Pts.	Pos.	Pts.	Pos.	Pts.	Pos.	Pts.	Total	Total – discard
1st place, gold medalist(s)	Norway	Siren Sundby	1	1.0	3	3.0	~~DSQ~~	~~26.0~~	1	1.0	19	19.0	4	4.0	4	4.0	1	1.0	1	1.0	1	1.0	12	12.0	73.0	47.0
2nd place, silver medalist(s)	Czech Republic	Lenka Šmídová	10	10.0	13	13.0	1	1.0	13	13.0	1	1.0	~~DSQ~~	~~26.0~~	1	1.0	6	6.0	3	3.0	7	7.0	10	10.0	91.0	65.0
3rd place, bronze medalist(s)	Denmark	Signe Livbjerg	4	4.0	6	6.0	7	7.0	15	15.0	8	8.0	6	6.0	10	10.0	3	3.0	11	11.0	4	4.0	~~25~~	~~25.0~~	99.0	74.0
4	Australia	Sarah Blanck	3	3.0	7	7.0	2	2.0	11	11.0	9	9.0	2	2.0	13	13.0	8	8.0	12	12.0	8	8.0	~~24~~	~~24.0~~	99.0	75.0
5	Finland	Sari Multala	8	8.0	9	9.0	11	11.0	6	6.0	10	10.0	1	1.0	9	9.0	2	2.0	15	15.0	~~24~~	~~24.0~~	14	14.0	109.0	85.0
6	Argentina	Serena Amato	5	5.0	2	2.0	22	22.0	8	8.0	13	13.0	~~22~~	~~22.0~~	2	2.0	11	11.0	4	4.0	10	10.0	9	9.0	108.0	86.0
7	China	Shen Xiaoying	11	11.0	20	20.0	3	3.0	2	2.0	12	12.0	7	7.0	20	20.0	~~OCS~~	~~26.0~~	6	6.0	2	2.0	5	5.0	114.0	88.0
8	New Zealand	Sarah Macky	14	14.0	4	4.0	8	8.0	19	19.0	4	4.0	~~20~~	~~20.0~~	6	6.0	4	4.0	10	10.0	5	5.0	17	17.0	111.0	91.0
9	Greece	Virginia Kravarioti	15	15.0	~~21~~	~~21.0~~	5	5.0	14	14.0	2	2.0	12	12.0	15	15.0	9	9.0	16	16.0	3	3.0	3	3.0	115.0	94.0
10	Germany	Petra Niemann	12	12.0	8	8.0	10	10.0	10	10.0	7	7.0	10	10.0	8	8.0	5	5.0	13	13.0	~~16~~	~~16.0~~	13	13.0	112.0	96.0
11	France	Blandine Rouille	~~25~~	~~25.0~~	17	17.0	4	4.0	5	5.0	5	5.0	18	18.0	3	3.0	14	14.0	14	14.0	11	11.0	6	6.0	122.0	97.0
12	Mexico	Tania Elías Calles	6	6.0	5	5.0	15	15.0	17	17.0	6	6.0	3	3.0	16	16.0	~~OCS~~	~~26.0~~	5	5.0	14	14.0	11	11.0	124.0	98.0
13	Spain	Neus Garriga	20	20.0	15	15.0	14	14.0	7	7.0	11	11.0	8	8.0	5	5.0	15	15.0	~~OCS~~	~~26.0~~	6	6.0	7	7.0	134.0	108.0
14	United States	Meg Galliard	9	9.0	11	11.0	13	13.0	9	9.0	3	3.0	13	13.0	11	11.0	16	16.0	9	9.0	~~19~~	~~19.0~~	19	19.0	132.0	113.0
15	Belgium	Min Dezillie	13	13.0	1	1.0	20	20.0	3	3.0	16	16.0	~~DNF~~	~~26.0~~	19	19.0	20	20.0	2	2.0	23	23.0	16	16.0	159.0	133.0
16	Italy	Larissa Nevierov	~~23~~	~~23.0~~	10	10.0	6	6.0	4	4.0	17	17.0	19	19.0	17	17.0	18	18.0	17	17.0	18	18.0	18	18.0	167.0	144.0
17	Slovenia	Teja Černe	7	7.0	~~23~~	~~23.0~~	21	21.0	18	18.0	14	14.0	23	23.0	14	14.0	21	21.0	7	7.0	12	12.0	8	8.0	168.0	145.0
18	Ireland	Maria Coleman	18	18.0	12	12.0	12	12.0	20	20.0	18	18.0	15	15.0	~~22~~	~~22.0~~	19	19.0	19	19.0	13	13.0	1	1.0	169.0	147.0
19	Netherlands	Carolijn Brouwer	19	19.0	~~DSQ~~	~~26.0~~	18	18.0	21	21.0	15	15.0	17	17.0	18	18.0	13	13.0	8	8.0	20	20.0	2	2.0	177.0	151.0
20	Belarus	Tatiana Drozdovskaya	22	22.0	19	19.0	19	19.0	~~OCS~~	~~26.0~~	21	21.0	5	5.0	7	7.0	7	7.0	20	20.0	17	17.0	15	15.0	178.0	152.0
21	Poland	Monika Bronicka	16	16.0	18	18.0	16	16.0	12	12.0	~~22~~	~~22.0~~	14	14.0	21	21.0	12	12.0	18	18.0	15	15.0	20	20.0	188.0	162.0
22	Portugal	Joana Pratas	2	2.0	24	24.0	17	17.0	22	22.0	24	24.0	16	16.0	12	12.0	~~OCS~~	~~26.0~~	22	22.0	9	9.0	21	21.0	191.0	169.0
23	Great Britain	Laura Baldwin	21	21.0	14	14.0	9	9.0	23	23.0	20	20.0	21	21.0	~~25~~	~~25.0~~	22	22.0	23	23.0	21	21.0	4	4.0	X.0	178.0
24	Japan	Maiko Sato	~~24~~	~~24.0~~	16	16.0	24	24.0	16	16.0	23	23.0	11	11.0	23	23.0	10	10.0	24	24.0	22	22.0	23	23.0	216.0	192.0
25	Russia	Natalia Ivanova	17	17.0	22	22.0	23	23.0	24	24.0	~~25~~	~~25.0~~	9	9.0	24	24.0	17	17.0	21	21.0	25	25.0	22	22.0	229.0	204.0

Legend: DSQ – Disqualified; OCS – On the course side of the starting line;
Discard is crossed out and does not count for the overall result.

== Daily standings ==
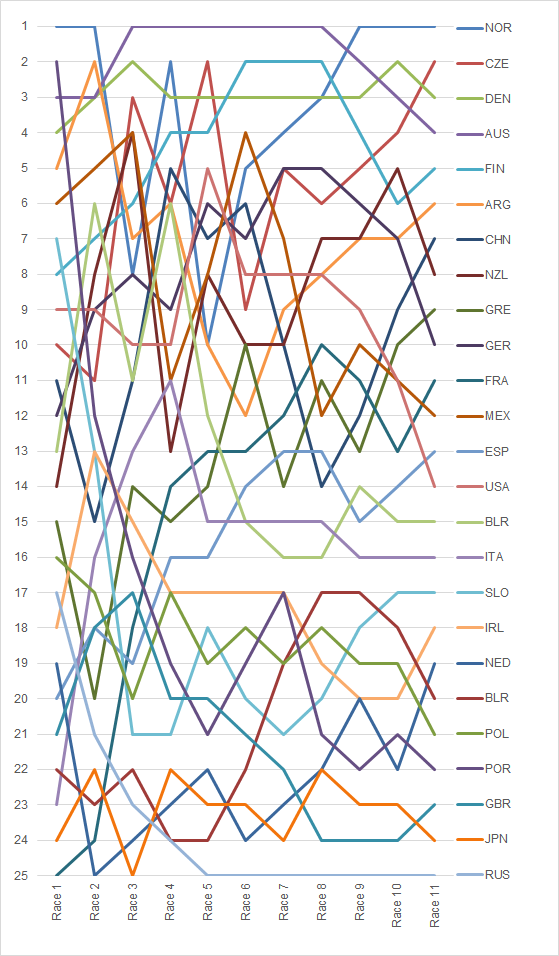
Graph showing the daily standings in the Women's Europe the 2004 Summer Olympics
