= Ireland at the 2004 Summer Olympics =

- IOC code: IRL
- NOC: Olympic Federation of Ireland
- Website: olympics.ie

in Athens
- Competitors: 46 in 9 sports
- Flag bearer: Niall Griffin
- Medals: Gold 0 Silver 0 Bronze 0 Total 0

Summer Olympics appearances (overview)
- 1924; 1928; 1932; 1936; 1948; 1952; 1956; 1960; 1964; 1968; 1972; 1976; 1980; 1984; 1988; 1992; 1996; 2000; 2004; 2008; 2012; 2016; 2020; 2024

Other related appearances
- Great Britain (1896–1920)

Ireland competed at the 2004 Summer Olympics in Athens, Greece, from 13 to 29 August 2004. This was the nation's eighteenth appearance at the Summer Olympics.

The Olympic Council of Ireland sent a total of 46 athletes to the Games, 32 men and 14 women, to compete in nine sports. The International Olympic Committee allowed athletes from Northern Ireland the option to compete at the Olympic games for either Great Britain and Northern Ireland, or for Ireland. Ireland's Olympic campaign for the Games started with a controversy, as middle-distance runner Cathal Lombard failed a drug test for EPO, and was not allowed to compete.

Originally, Ireland left Athens with only a gold medal from show jumper Cian O'Connor. On 8 October 2004, International Federation for Equestrian Sports announced that Waterford Crystal, owned by O'Connor, failed a horse doping test for fluphenazine and zuclopenthixol that formally stripped off O'Connor's Olympic title in early 2005. Because O'Connor decided not to appeal, he was formally stripped of his Olympic title, which was awarded to silver medalist Rodrigo Pessoa of Brazil.

== Athletics ==
Irish athletes achieved qualifying standards in the following athletics events (up to a maximum of three athletes in each event at the 'A' Standard, and 1 at the 'B' Standard). Middle-distance runner Cathal Lombard was initially selected to the team, but he failed a drug test for EPO, and was not allowed to compete.

Key

- Note–Ranks given for track events are within the athlete's heat only
- Q = Qualified for the next round
- q = Qualified for the next round as a fastest loser or, in field events, by position without achieving the qualifying target
- NR = National record
- N/A = Round not applicable for the event
- Bye = Athlete not required to compete in round

Men
Track & road events

Athlete	Event	Heat		Quarterfinal		Semifinal		Final	
Athlete	Event	Result	Rank	Result	Rank	Result	Rank	Result	Rank
Paul Brizzel	200 m	21.00	6	Did not advance					
Mark Carroll	5000 m	13:46.81	15	—				Did not advance	
Alistair Cragg	5000 m	13:23.01	7 q	—				13:43.06	12
James Nolan	1500 m	3:41.14	8 q	—		3:42.61	9	Did not advance	
Robert Heffernan	20 km walk	—						DSQ	

Field events

Athlete	Event	Qualification		Final	
Athlete	Event	Distance	Position	Distance	Position
Adrian O'Dwyer	High jump	NM	—	Did not advance	

Women
Track & road events

Athlete	Event	Heat		Semifinal		Final	
Athlete	Event	Result	Rank	Result	Rank	Result	Rank
Marie Davenport	10000 m	—				31:50.49	14
Olive Loughnane	20 km walk	—				DNF	
Maria McCambridge	5000 m	15:57.42	15	—		Did not advance	
Derval O'Rourke	100 m hurdles	13.46	7	Did not advance			
Sonia O'Sullivan	5000 m	14:59.61	7 q	—		16:20.90	14

== Boxing ==
Ireland sent one boxer to the 2004 Summer Olympics.

Athlete	Event	Round of 32	Round of 16	Quarterfinals	Semifinals	Final	
Athlete	Event	Opposition Result	Opposition Result	Opposition Result	Opposition Result	Opposition Result	Rank
Andy Lee	Middleweight	Angulo (MEX); W 38–23	N'Jikam (CMR); L 27–27^{+}	Did not advance			

== Canoeing ==
=== Slalom ===
Athlete	Event	Preliminary						Semifinal		Final			
Athlete	Event	Run 1	Rank	Run 2	Rank	Total	Rank	Time	Rank	Time	Rank	Total	Rank
Eoin Rheinisch	Men's K-1	105.28	21	98.81	15	204.06	21	Did not advance					
Eadaoin Ní Challarain	Women's K-1	121.42	15	119.33	16	240.75	15 Q	116.95	11	Did not advance			

== Cycling ==
=== Road ===
Athlete	Event	Time	Rank
Ciarán Power	Men's road race	5:41:56	13
Mark Scanlon	Men's road race	Did not finish	

=== Mountain biking ===
Athlete	Event	Time	Rank
Robin Seymour	Men's cross-country	2:28:32	30
Jenny McCauley	Women's cross-country	LAP (1 lap)	30

== Equestrian ==
=== Dressage ===
Athlete	Horse	Event	Grand Prix		Grand Prix Special		Grand Prix Freestyle		Overall	
Athlete	Horse	Event	Score	Rank	Score	Rank	Score	Rank	Score	Rank
Heike Holstein	Welt Adel	Individual	60.417	50	Did not advance					

=== Eventing ===
Athlete	Horse	Event	Dressage		Cross-country			Jumping						Total	
Athlete	Horse	Event	Dressage		Cross-country			Qualifier			Final			Total	
Athlete	Horse	Event	Penalties	Rank	Penalties	Total	Rank	Penalties	Total	Rank	Penalties	Total	Rank	Penalties	Rank
Edmond Gibney	King's Highway	Individual	68.00 #	64	80.60 #	148.60 #	65	4.00	152.60 #	62	Did not advance			152.60	62
Niall Griffin	Sinead Cody	Individual	58.40	40	4.80	63.20	30	10.00 #	73.20	30 Q	10.00	83.20	23	83.20	23
Sasha Harrison	All Love du Fenaud	Individual	52.80	31	41.60 #	94.40 #	56	8.00	102.40 #	49	Did not advance			102.40	49
Mark Kyle	Drunken Disorderly	Individual	63.00 #	50	0.00	63.00	=28	4.00	67.00	=23 Q	8.00	75.00	21	75.00	21
Susan Shortt	Just Beauty Queen	Individual	58.80	41	6.00	64.80	32	12.00 #	76.80	32	Did not advance			76.80	32
Edmond Gibney; Niall Griffin; Sasha Harrison; Mark Kyle; Susan Shortt	See above	Team	170.00	9	10.80	191.00	7	16.00	217.00	8	—			217.00	8

"#" indicates that the score of this rider does not count in the team competition, since only the best three results of a team are counted.

=== Show jumping ===
Athlete	Horse	Event	Qualification								Final					Total	
Athlete	Horse	Event	Round 1		Round 2			Round 3			Round A		Round B			Total	
Athlete	Horse	Event	Penalties	Rank	Penalties	Total	Rank	Penalties	Total	Rank	Penalties	Rank	Penalties	Total	Rank	Penalties	Rank
Kevin Babington	Carling King	Individual	2	17	1	3	4 Q	5	8	=5 Q	8	=12 Q	4	12	=5	12	=4
Marion Hughes	Fortunus	Individual	6	=42	Retired			Did not advance									
Jessica Kürten	Castle Forbes Maike	Individual	4	=19	9	13	=33 Q	0	13	17 Q	0	=1 Q	21	21	=19	21	=19
Cian O'Connor	Waterford Crystal	Individual	1	=11	12	13	=33 Q	9	22	36 Q	4	=4 Q	0	4	1	4	DSQ*
Kevin Babington; Marion Hughes; Jessica Kürten; Cian O'Connor	See above	Team	—								22	10 Q	14	36	7	36	DSQ*

* Cian O'Connor originally claimed the gold medal in the individual show jumping, but was disqualified after his horse Waterford Crystal failed the horse doping test for fluphenazine and zuclopenthixol.

== Rowing ==
Men

Athlete	Event	Heats		Repechage		Semifinals		Final	
Athlete	Event	Time	Rank	Time	Rank	Time	Rank	Time	Rank
Sam Lynch; Gearoid Towey	Lightweight double sculls	6:16.63	1 SA/B	Bye		6:19.09	4 FB	6:49.26	10
Richard Archibald; Eugene Coakley; Niall O'Toole; Paul Griffin	Lightweight four	5:52.54	2 SA/B	Bye		5:58.89	3 FA	6:09.33	6

Qualification Legend: FA=Final A (medal); FB=Final B (non-medal); FC=Final C (non-medal); FD=Final D (non-medal); FE=Final E (non-medal); FF=Final F (non-medal); SA/B=Semifinals A/B; SC/D=Semifinals C/D; SE/F=Semifinals E/F; R=Repechage

== Sailing ==
Men

Athlete	Event	Race											Net points	Final rank
Athlete	Event	1	2	3	4	5	6	7	8	9	10	M*	Net points	Final rank
David Burrows	Finn	17	14	9	3	18	2	~~OCS~~	10	11	10	22	116	12
Ross Killian; Ger Owens	470	11	14	16	14	14	14	~~19~~	16	4	16	10	129	16
Killian Collins; Mark Mansfield	Star	11	15	11	13	13	15	~~17~~	9	10	13	15	125	17

Women

Athlete	Event	Race											Net points	Final rank
Athlete	Event	1	2	3	4	5	6	7	8	9	10	M*	Net points	Final rank
Maria Coleman	Europe	18	12	12	20	18	15	~~22~~	19	19	13	1	147	18

Open

Athlete	Event	Race																Net points	Final rank
Athlete	Event	1	2	3	4	5	6	7	8	9	10	11	12	13	14	15	M*	Net points	Final rank
Rory Fitzpatrick	Laser	33	26	~~38~~	31	26	22	27	26	24	11	—					22	248	30
Fraser Brown; Tom Fitzpatrick	49er	10	16	10	4	12	5	~~17~~	2	17	16	14	14	~~DSQ~~	7	13	12	152	16

M = Medal race; OCS = On course side of the starting line; DSQ = Disqualified; DNF = Did not finish; DNS= Did not start; RDG = Redress given

== Shooting ==
Ireland qualified one shooter.

Men

Athlete	Event	Qualification		Final	
Athlete	Event	Points	Rank	Points	Rank
Derek Burnett	Trap	119	=9	Did not advance	

== Swimming ==
Men

Athlete	Event	Heat		Semifinal		Final	
Athlete	Event	Time	Rank	Time	Rank	Time	Rank
Michael Wiliamson	200 m breaststroke	2:15.75	22	Did not advance			

Women

Athlete	Event	Heat		Semifinal		Final	
Athlete	Event	Time	Rank	Time	Rank	Time	Rank
Emma Robinson	100 m breaststroke	1:11.40	24	Did not advance			

== See also ==
- Ireland at the 2004 Summer Paralympics
