= Sailing at the 2000 Summer Olympics – Europe =

Sailing at the Olympics

Europe at the Games of the XXVII Olympiad
- Line drawing of the Europe
- Venue: Olympic Sailing Shore Base, Sydney Harbour
- Dates: First race: 20 September 2000; Last race: 29 September 2000
- Competitors: 27 from 27 nations
- Teams: 27

Medalists
1st place, gold medalist(s)		Shirley Robertson	Great Britain
2nd place, silver medalist(s)		Margriet Matthijsse	Netherlands
3rd place, bronze medalist(s)		Serena Amato	Argentina

The women's Europe at the 2000 Summer Olympics was held from 20 to 29 September 2000 at the Olympic Sailing Shore Base in Sydney Harbour. Points were awarded for placement in each race. Eleven races were scheduled and sailed. Each sailor had two discards.

== Race schedule ==
●	Practice races	●	Competition day	●	Last day of racing

Date	September																October
Date	15 Fri	16 Sat	17 Sun	18 Mon	19 Tue	20 Wed	21 Thu	22 Fri	23 Sat	24 Sun	25 Mon	26 Tue	27 Wed	28 Thu	29 Fri	30 Sat	1 Sun
Women's Europe						● ●	● ●	Spare day	● ●	Spare day	Spare day	● ●	Spare day	●	● ●		

== Final results ==
Rank	Country	Helmsman	Race 1		Race 2		Race 3		Race 4		Race 5		Race 6		Race 7		Race 8		Race 9		Race 10		Race 11		Total	Total – discard
Rank	Country	Helmsman	Pos.	Pts.	Pos.	Pts.	Pos.	Pts.	Pos.	Pts.	Pos.	Pts.	Pos.	Pts.	Pos.	Pts.	Pos.	Pts.	Pos.	Pts.	Pos.	Pts.	Pos.	Pts.	Total	Total – discard
1st place, gold medalist(s)	Great Britain	Shirley Robertson	4	4.0	3	3.0	1	1.0	6	6.0	1	1.0	~~13~~	~~13.0~~	8	8.0	9	9.0	2	2.0	~~16~~	~~16.0~~	3	3.0	66.0	37.0
2nd place, silver medalist(s)	Netherlands	Margriet Matthijsse	1	1.0	~~24~~	~~24.0~~	~~19~~	~~19.0~~	2	2.0	6	6.0	5	5.0	3	3.0	19	19.0	1	1.0	1	1.0	1	1.0	82.0	39.0
3rd place, bronze medalist(s)	Argentina	Serena Amato	6	6.0	~~15~~	~~15.0~~	9	9.0	5	5.0	2	2.0	2	2.0	6	6.0	1	1.0	~~14~~	~~14.0~~	12	12.0	8	8.0	80.0	51.0
4	Spain	Neus Garriga	10	10.0	2	2.0	11	11.0	13	13.0	5	5.0	1	1.0	~~17~~	~~17.0~~	3	3.0	11	11.0	5	5.0	~~OCS~~	~~28.0~~	106.0	61.0
5	Finland	Sari Multala	2	2.0	7	7.0	~~16~~	~~16.0~~	12	12.0	~~20~~	~~20.0~~	12	12.0	9	9.0	4	4.0	7	7.0	2	2.0	6	6.0	97.0	61.0
6	Belgium	Min Dezillie	8	8.0	8	8.0	~~26~~	~~26.0~~	10	10.0	4	4.0	4	4.0	10	10.0	~~12~~	~~12.0~~	10	10.0	7	7.0	7	7.0	106.0	68.0
7	Czech Republic	Lenka Šmídová	~~15~~	~~15.0~~	~~19~~	~~19.0~~	15	15.0	7	7.0	8	8.0	3	3.0	13	13.0	2	2.0	15	15.0	10	10.0	2	2.0	109.0	75.0
8	Italy	Larissa Nevierov	3	3.0	9	9.0	4	4.0	~~19~~	~~19.0~~	13	13.0	~~18~~	~~18.0~~	7	7.0	11	11.0	8	8.0	8	8.0	12	12.0	112.0	75.0
9	New Zealand	Sarah Macky	12	12.0	1	1.0	14	14.0	~~16~~	~~16.0~~	12	12.0	11	11.0	5	5.0	~~15~~	~~15.0~~	6	6.0	3	3.0	15	15.0	110.0	79.0
10	Denmark	Kristine Roug	5	5.0	21	21.0	2	2.0	1	1.0	10	10.0	6	6.0	4	4.0	~~OCS~~	~~28.0~~	16	16.0	19	19.0	~~OCS~~	~~28.0~~	140.0	84.0
11	Canada	Beth Calkin	17	17.0	4	4.0	~~24~~	~~24.0~~	18	18.0	3	3.0	~~25~~	~~25.0~~	1	1.0	14	14.0	4	4.0	20	20.0	4	4.0	134.0	85.0
12	Ireland	Maria Coleman	11	11.0	5	5.0	3	3.0	15	15.0	~~17~~	~~17.0~~	7	7.0	11	11.0	~~17~~	~~17.0~~	9	9.0	14	14.0	11	11.0	120.0	86.0
13	Germany	Petra Niemann	13	13.0	6	6.0	18	18.0	3	3.0	9	9.0	15	15.0	~~OCS~~	~~28.0~~	~~OCS~~	~~28.0~~	5	5.0	9	9.0	9	9.0	143.0	87.0
14	Poland	Monika Bronicka	~~14~~	~~14.0~~	11	11.0	13	13.0	14	14.0	~~23~~	~~23.0~~	8	8.0	12	12.0	7	7.0	12	12.0	13	13.0	5	5.0	132.0	95.0
15	Australia	Melanie Dennison	18	18.0	17	17.0	7	7.0	~~OCS~~	~~28.0~~	~~19~~	~~19.0~~	10	10.0	19	19.0	8	8.0	3	3.0	4	4.0	16	16.0	149.0	102.0
16	United States	Courtenay Becker-Dey	~~20~~	~~20.0~~	18	18.0	5	5.0	8	8.0	14	14.0	19	19.0	15	15.0	6	6.0	13	13.0	6	6.0	~~22~~	~~22.0~~	146.0	104.0
17	Mexico	Tania Elías Calles	19	19.0	~~23~~	~~23.0~~	8	8.0	11	11.0	7	7.0	16	16.0	2	2.0	13	13.0	~~20~~	~~20.0~~	18	18.0	14	14.0	151.0	108.0
18	Greece	Maria Vlachou	23	23.0	12	12.0	10	10.0	4	4.0	~~27~~	~~27.0~~	~~26~~	~~26.0~~	18	18.0	5	5.0	18	18.0	21	21.0	18	18.0	182.0	129.0
19	Norway	Siren Sundby	7	7.0	10	10.0	12	12.0	~~23~~	~~23.0~~	16	16.0	21	21.0	~~DNF~~	~~28.0~~	10	10.0	23	23.0	22	22.0	10	10.0	182.0	131.0
20	Austria	Denise Cesky	22	22.0	22	22.0	6	6.0	9	9.0	15	15.0	9	9.0	14	14.0	16	16.0	~~26~~	~~26.0~~	~~24~~	~~24.0~~	21	21.0	184.0	134.0
21	Portugal	Joana Pratas	9	9.0	20	20.0	~~21~~	~~21.0~~	~~24~~	~~24.0~~	11	11.0	14	14.0	16	16.0	20	20.0	19	19.0	15	15.0	17	17.0	186.0	141.0
22	Sweden	Therese Torgersson	16	16.0	14	14.0	~~23~~	~~23.0~~	20	20.0	18	18.0	22	22.0	20	20.0	21	21.0	17	17.0	11	11.0	~~23~~	~~23.0~~	205.0	159.0
23	Japan	Maiko Sato	21	21.0	13	13.0	20	20.0	22	22.0	22	22.0	17	17.0	22	22.0	~~24~~	~~24.0~~	22	22.0	~~23~~	~~23.0~~	13	13.0	219.0	172.0
24	Belarus	Tatiana Drozdovskaya	25	25.0	16	16.0	17	17.0	17	17.0	26	26.0	~~27~~	~~27.0~~	~~OCS~~	~~28.0~~	18	18.0	21	21.0	17	17.0	19	19.0	231.0	176.0
25	Bermuda	Sara Wright	~~26~~	~~26.0~~	25	25.0	22	22.0	21	21.0	21	21.0	24	24.0	23	23.0	23	23.0	25	25.0	~~27~~	~~27.0~~	20	20.0	257.0	204.0
26	Cayman Islands	Tomeaka McTaggart	~~27~~	~~27.0~~	~~27~~	~~27.0~~	25	25.0	25	25.0	25	25.0	23	23.0	21	21.0	22	22.0	27	27.0	25	25.0	24	24.0	271.0	217.0
27	Latvia	Žaklīna Litauniece	~~24~~	~~24.0~~	~~26~~	~~26.0~~	~~27~~	~~27.0~~	26	26.0	24	24.0	20	20.0	24	24.0	25	25.0	24	24.0	26	26.0	25	25.0	271.0	218.0

Legend: DNC – Did not come to the starting area; DNF – Did not finish; DSQ – Disqualified; OCS – On the course side of the starting line;
Discard is crossed out and does not count for the overall result.
