= Commonwealth Sailing Championships =

2003 sailing competition in Melbourne, Australia

1st Commonwealth Sailing Championships

Event title
- Edition: 1st
- Host: Sandringham Yacht Club

Event details
- Venue: Melbourne, Australia
- Dates: 18–23 January 2003

The inaugural Commonwealth Sailing Championships were held in Port Phillip, Melbourne in January 2003. Both the Commonwealth Games Federation and the International Sailing Federation (ISAF) approved the Inaugural Commonwealth Sailing Championships. The Championship venue was the Sandringham Yacht Club, which has also hosted the ISAF Grade 1 event (the Olympic & Invited Classes Regatta).

== Classes ==
The classes of competition were:

- Laser (men)
- Laser Radial (women)
- 470 (men)
- 470 (women)
- Mistral (men)
- Mistral (women)
- Hobie 16 (open)

== Results ==
=== Men's events ===
Event	Gold	Silver	Bronze
Laser	(Australia) Michael Blackburn	(England) Ed Wright	(New Zealand) Alastair Gair
470	(Australia) Nathan Wilmot (Australia) Malcolm Page	(Australia) Mathew Belcher (Australia) Daniel Belcher	(New Zealand) Andrew Brown (New Zealand) Jamie Hunt
Mistral			

=== Women's events ===
Event	Gold	Silver	Bronze
Laser Radial	(Northern Ireland) Debbie Hanna	(Australia) Melanie Dennison	(Australia) Megan De Lange
470 class	(Australia) Jenny Armstrong (Australia) Belinda Stowell	(Australia) Lisa Charlson (Australia) Rike Ziegelmayer	(New Zealand) Shelley Hesson (New Zealand) Linda Dickson
Mistral			

=== Open events ===
Event	Gold	Silver	Bronze
Hobie 16 (open)	(Australia) Robbie Lovig (Australia) Glen Douglas	(Fiji) Shayne Brodie (Fiji) Loren Gough	(Australia) Steve Fields (Australia) Kieran Browne

=== Medal table ===
Rank	Nation	Gold	Silver	Bronze	Total
1	Australia	5	3	2	10
2	Northern Ireland	1	0	0	1
3	England	0	1	0	1
3	Fiji	0	1	0	1
5	New Zealand	0	0	3	3
Totals (5 entries)		6	5	5	16
