= Cutolo =

Cutolo is an Italian surname. Notable people with the surname include:

- Alessandro Cutolo (1899–1995), Italian academic, television presenter, actor and historian
- Aniello Cutolo (born 1983), Italian footballer
- Frank Cutolo (born 1976), American player of Canadian football
- Myriam Cutolo (born 1984), Italian yacht racer
- Raffaele Cutolo (1941–2021), Italian crime boss
- Rosetta Cutolo (1937–2023), sister of Raffaele Cutolo
- William Cutolo (1949–1999), American mobster
