= Neus Garriga =

Spanish sailor

Personal information
- Full name: Neus Garriga Turón
- Born: 18 October 1978 (age 48) Barcelona, Spain
- Height: 1.65 m (5 ft 5 in)
- Weight: 65 kg (143 lb)

Sailing career
- Sport: Sailing
- Club: Club Nàutic El Balís
- Class: Europe
Medal record
Representing Spain
Summer Universiade
Silver medal – second place	1999 Palma de Mallorca	Europe

Neus Garriga Turón (Note: In this Spanish name, the first or paternal surname is Garriga and the second or maternal family name is Turón.) (born 18 October 1978) is a Spanish former sailor, who specialized in the Europe class. She competed for the nation's sailing squad in two editions of the Olympic Games (2000 and 2004), and came closest to the medal haul on her Olympic debut in Sydney, trailing behind the bronze medalist Serena Amato of Argentina. Garriga trained throughout most of her sailing career for El Balís Nautical Club (Spanish: Club Nàutic El Balís in the outskirts of Barcelona.

Garriga made her Olympic debut in Sydney 2000, sailing in the Europe class. There, she scored a career best result in the sixth heat with a momentous lead over the rest of the fleet, but a black flag disqualification from the last of eleven races dropped Garriga out of medal contention to fourth overall, with a net total of 61 points.

At the 2004 Summer Olympics in Athens, Garriga qualified for her second Spanish team in the Europe class by placing twelfth and receiving a berth from the 2003 ISAF World Championships in Cádiz. Unlike her previous Olympics, Garriga could not compensate from an early surge in the opening to climb again on top of the rankings, as she finished thirteenth out of twenty-five sailors in the overall leaderboard, posting a final net grade of 108.
