= Sailing at the 2004 Summer Olympics – Star =

Men's Star at the Games of the XXVIII Olympiad
- Line drawing of the Star (Current Configuration)
- Venue: Agios Kosmas Olympic Sailing Centre
- Dates: First race: 21 August 2004; Last race: 28 August 2004
- Competitors: 34 from 17 nations
- Teams: 17

Medalists
| 1st place, gold medalist(s) | | Torben Grael; Marcelo Ferreira | Brazil |
| 2nd place, silver medalist(s) | | David Ross MacDonald; Mike Wolfs | Canada |
| 3rd place, bronze medalist(s) | | Pascal Rambeau; Xavier Rohart | France |

The Men's Star was a sailing event on the Sailing at the 2004 Summer Olympics program in Agios Kosmas Olympic Sailing Centre. Eleven races were scheduled and completed with one discard. 34 sailors, on 17 boats, from 17 nation competed.

== Race schedule ==
| ● | Practice races | ● | Competition day | ● | Last day of racing |

| Date | August | | | | | | | | | | | | | | | | | |
| Date | 12 Thu | 13 Fri | 14 Sat | 15 Sun | 16 Mon | 17 Tue | 18 Wed | 19 Thu | 20 Fri | 21 Sat | 22 Sun | 23 Mon | 24 Tue | 25 Wed | 26 Thu | 27 Fri | 28 Sat | 29 Sun |
|---|---|---|---|---|---|---|---|---|---|---|---|---|---|---|---|---|---|---|
| Actual | ● | ● | | | | | | | | S1,2 | S3,4 | S5 | S6 | S7,8 | 9,10 | Res | MR | |
| Scheduled | | | | | | | | | PR | S1,2 | S3,4 | S5,6 | Res | S7,8 | S9,10 | Res | MR | |

== Final results ==
| Rank | Country | Helmsman | Crew | Race 1 | | Race 2 | | Race 3 | | Race 4 | | Race 5 | | Race 6 | | Race 7 | | Race 8 | | Race 9 | | Race 10 | | Race 11 | | Total | Total – discard |
| Rank | Country | Helmsman | Crew | Pos. | Pts. | Pos. | Pts. | Pos. | Pts. | Pos. | Pts. | Pos. | Pts. | Pos. | Pts. | Pos. | Pts. | Pos. | Pts. | Pos. | Pts. | Pos. | Pts. | Pos. | Pts. | Total | Total – discard |
| 1st place, gold medalist(s) | Brazil | Torben Grael | Marcelo Ferreira | 5 | 5.0 | 4 | 4.0 | 1 | 1.0 | 1 | 1.0 | 2 | 2.0 | 5 | 5.0 | 2 | 2.0 | 7 | 7.0 | 11 | 11.0 | 4 | 4.0 | ~~DNC~~ | ~~18.0~~ | 60.0 | 42.0 |
| 2nd place, silver medalist(s) | Canada | David Ross MacDonald | Mike Wolfs | 7 | 7.0 | 11 | 11.0 | 4 | 4.0 | 3 | 3.0 | 1 | 1.0 | RDG | 5.2 | 8 | 8.0 | ~~14~~ | ~~14.0~~ | 8 | 8.0 | 2 | 2.0 | 2 | 2.0 | 65.2 | 51.2 |
| 3rd place, bronze medalist(s) | France | Pascal Rambeau | Xavier Rohart | 3 | 3.0 | 9 | 9.0 | 6 | 6.0 | ~~15~~ | ~~15.0~~ | 7 | 7.0 | 2 | 2.0 | 4 | 4.0 | 12 | 12.0 | 3 | 3.0 | 1 | 1.0 | 7 | 7.0 | 69.0 | 54.0 |
| 4 | Switzerland | Flavio Marazzi | Enrico De Maria | 10 | 10.0 | 1 | 1.0 | 3 | 3.0 | 7 | 7.0 | 9 | 9.0 | 9 | 9.0 | ~~12~~ | ~~12.0~~ | 11 | 11.0 | 4 | 4.0 | 8 | 8.0 | 9 | 7.0 | 81.0 | 69.0 |
| 5 | United States | Paul Cayard | Phil Trinter | 1 | 1.0 | 6 | 6.0 | 15 | 15.0 | 10 | 10.0 | 3 | 3.0 | 6 | 6.0 | 1 | 1.0 | 15 | 15.0 | 6 | 6.0 | 8 | 8.0 | ~~16~~ | ~~16.0~~ | 87.0 | 71.0 |
| 6 | Great Britain | Iain Percy | Steve Mitchell | 8 | 8.0 | 3 | 3.0 | 12 | 12.0 | 9 | 9.0 | 6 | 6.0 | 3 | 3.0 | 16 | 16.0 | 5 | 5.0 | 7 | 7.0 | ~~17~~ | ~~17.0~~ | 4 | 4.0 | 90.0 | 73.0 |
| 7 | Italy | Francesco Bruni | Guido Vignar | 13 | 13.0 | 5 | 5.0 | 9 | 9.0 | 4 | 4.0 | ~~16~~ | ~~16.0~~ | 12 | 12.0 | 3 | 3.0 | 8 | 8.0 | 2 | 2.0 | 5 | 5.0 | 14 | 14.0 | 91.0 | 75.0 |
| 8 | Bermuda | Peter Bromby | Lee White | ~~17~~ | ~~17.0~~ | 16 | 16.0 | 8 | 8.0 | 11 | 11.0 | 12 | 12.0 | 10 | 10.0 | 6 | 6.0 | 4 | 4.0 | 1 | 1.0 | 3 | 3.0 | 11 | 11.0 | 99.0 | 82.0 |
| 9 | Denmark | Nicklas Holm | Claus Olesen | 4 | 4.0 | 12 | 12.0 | 2 | 2.0 | 2 | 2.0 | 11 | 11.0 | 7 | 7.0 | 5 | 5.0 | ~~17~~ | ~~17.0~~ | 16 | 16.0 | 14 | 14.0 | 10 | 10.0 | 100.0 | 83.0 |
| 10 | Spain | Chuny Bermúdez | Pablo Arrarte | 2 | 2.0 | 13 | 13.0 | 5 | 5.0 | 6 | 6.0 | ~~17~~ | ~~17.0~~ | 8 | 8.0 | 13 | 13.0 | 6 | 6.0 | 12 | 12.0 | 15 | 15.0 | 5 | 5.0 | 102.0 | 85.0 |
| 11 | Greece | Leonidas Pelekanakis | Georgios Kontogouris | 16 | 16.0 | 2 | 2.0 | 10 | 10.0 | ~~17~~ | ~~17.0~~ | 5 | 5.0 | 14 | 14.0 | 10 | 10.0 | 1 | 1.0 | 9 | 9.0 | 16 | 16.0 | 3 | 3.0 | 103.0 | 86.0 |
| 12 | Sweden | Fredrik Lööf | Anders Ekström | 15 | 15.0 | 8 | 8.0 | ~~OCS~~ | ~~18.0~~ | 14 | 14.0 | 10 | 10.0 | 1 | 1.0 | 14 | 14.0 | 2 | 2.0 | 15 | 15.0 | 9 | 9.0 | 8 | 8.0 | 114.0 | 96.0 |
| 13 | Austria | Hans Spitzauer | Andreas Hanakamp | 12 | 12.0 | 14 | 14.0 | 7 | 7.0 | ~~16~~ | ~~16.0~~ | 14 | 14.0 | 16 | 16.0 | 9 | 9.0 | 3 | 3.0 | 5 | 5.0 | 11 | 11.0 | 6 | 6.0 | 113.0 | 97.0 |
| 14 | Netherlands | Mark Neeleman | Peter van Niekerk | 14 | 14.0 | 10 | 10.0 | 14 | 14.0 | 12 | 12.0 | 8 | 8.0 | 4 | 4.0 | 15 | 15.0 | 10 | 10.0 | ~~17~~ | ~~17.0~~ | 10 | 10.0 | 1 | 1.0 | 115.0 | 98.0 |
| 15 | Australia | Colin Beashel | David Giles | 9 | 9.0 | 7 | 7.0 | ~~OCS~~ | ~~18.0~~ | 5 | 5.0 | 4 | 4.0 | 13 | 13.0 | 11 | 11.0 | 16 | 16.0 | 14 | 14.0 | 6 | 6.0 | 13 | 13.0 | 116.0 | 98.0 |
| 16 | Germany | Alexander Hagen | Jochen Wolfram | 6 | 6.0 | ~~17~~ | ~~17.0~~ | 13 | 13.0 | 8 | 8.0 | 15 | 15.0 | 11 | 11.0 | 7 | 7.0 | 13 | 13.0 | 13 | 13.0 | 12 | 12.0 | 12 | 12.0 | 127.0 | 110.0 |
| 17 | Ireland | Mark Mansfield | Killian Collins | 11 | 11.0 | 15 | 15.0 | 11 | 11.0 | 13 | 13.0 | 13 | 13.0 | 15 | 15.0 | ~~17~~ | ~~17.0~~ | 9 | 9.0 | 10 | 10.0 | 13 | 13.0 | 15 | 15.0 | 142.0 | 125.0 |

Legend: DNC – Did not come to the starting area; OCS – On the course side of the starting line; RDG – Redress given;
Discard is crossed out and does not count for the overall result.

== Daily standings ==
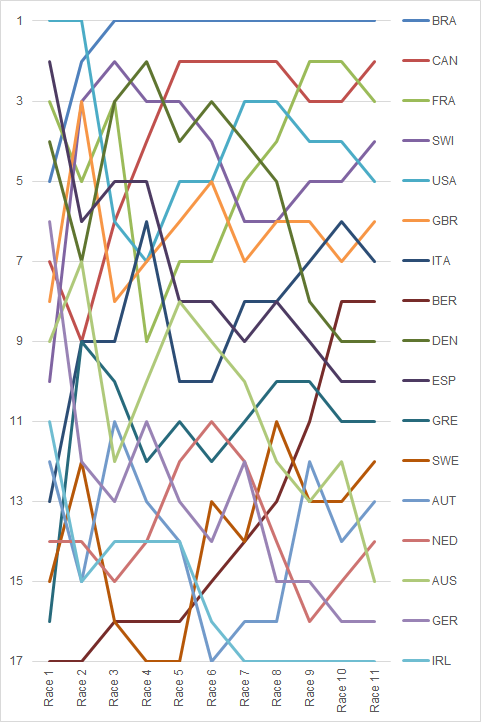
Graph showing the daily standings in the Star during the 2004 Summer Olympics
