= Ross MacDonald =

Ross MacDonald may refer to:

- Ross MacDonald (musician), musician with The 1975
- Ross MacDonald (sailor), Canadian sailor
- Ross Macdonald, American-Canadian writer of crime fiction
