= Rouillé (surname) =

Rouillé is a French surname, sometimes written Rouille. Notable people with the surname include:

- André Rouillé (1948–2025), French historian and theorist of photography
- Angélique de Rouillé (1756–1840), Belgian writer
- Antoine Louis Rouillé (1689–1761), French statesman
- Blandine Rouille (born 1980), French yacht racer
- Guillaume Rouillé (c. 1504–1589), French bookseller-printer and Renaissance humanist
- John E. Rouille (1932–2024), American law enforcement officer
