= Kjærgaard =

Kjærgaard is a Danish surname. In 2013, there were 3,408 people in Denmark with this surname.

Notable people with this family name or surname include:

- Annika Kjærgaard (born 1971), Swedish singer
- Kristian Skjødt Kjærgaard (born 1980), Danish sailor
- Mie Olise Kjærgaard (born 1974), Danish artist
- Nicolai Kjærgaard (born 1999), Danish racing driver
- Oliver Kjærgaard (born 1998), Danish footballer
- Per Kjærgaard Nielsen (born 1955), Danish sailor
- Steffen Kjærgaard (born 1973), Norwegian cyclist
- Tonje Kjærgaard (born 1975), Danish handball player
