= Denise Cesky =

Austrian sailor

Personal information
- Nationality: Austrian
- Born: 5 February 1976 (age 49); Vienna, Austria

Sport
- Sport: Sailing

Denise Cesky (born 5 February 1976) is an Austrian sailor. She competed in the Europe event at the 2000 Summer Olympics.
