= Beth Calkin =

Canadian sailor

Personal information
- Born: 25 August 1971 (age 55) Halifax, Nova Scotia, Canada

Sport
- Sport: Sailing

Beth Calkin (born 25 August 1971) is a Canadian sailor. She competed in the Europe event at the 2000 Summer Olympics.
