= Monika Bronicka =

Polish former sailor

Personal information
- Nationality: Poland
- Born: 4 May 1977 (age 49) Olsztyn, Poland
- Height: 1.68 m (5 ft 6 in)
- Weight: 66 kg (146 lb)

Sailing career
- Sport: Sailing
- Club: AZS UWM Olsztyn
- Coached by: Mariusz Delgas
- Class: Dinghy

Monika Bronicka (born 4 May 1977) is a Polish former sailor, who specialized in the Europe class. She was selected to compete for Poland in two editions of the Olympic Games (2000 and 2004), and also scored top fifteen placements in a major international regatta, spanning the World and European Championships. Bronicka is a member of the sailing squad for AZS UWM Olsztyn, under the tutelage of her personal coach and eventual spouse Mariusz Delgas.

Bronicka made her Olympic debut in Sydney 2000, finishing a credible fourteenth in the Europe class with a satisfying net grade of 95, but narrowly falling short from the top ten spot by a distant twelve-point deficit.

At the 2004 Summer Olympics in Athens, Bronicka qualified for her second Polish team in the Europe class by placing fourteenth and receiving a berth from the 2003 ISAF World Championships in Cadiz. Unlike her previous Games, Bronicka could not be able to improve her Olympic feat with mediocre marks recorded throughout the eleven-race series, sitting her in twenty-first position with 162 net points.
