= Péter Czégai =

Hungarian sailor

Personal information
- Nationality: Hungarian
- Born: 20 July 1976 (age 50) Veszprém, Hungary

Sport
- Sport: Sailing

Péter Czégai (born 20 July 1976) is a Hungarian sailor. He competed in the men's 470 event at the 2004 Summer Olympics.
