= Davor Glavina =

Slovenian sailor

Personal information
- Nationality: Slovenian
- Born: 10 December 1970 (age 54); Koper, Yugoslavia

Sport
- Sport: Sailing

Davor Glavina (born 10 December 1970) is a Slovenian sailor. He competed in the men's 470 event at the 2004 Summer Olympics.
