= Maciej Grabowski (sailor) =

Polish sailor

Personal information
- Full name: Maciej Tadeusz Grabowski
- Nationality: Poland
- Born: 2 March 1978 (age 48) Gdynia, Poland
- Height: 1.86 m (6 ft 1 in)
- Weight: 78 kg (172 lb)

Sailing career
- Sport: Sailing
- Club: Sopocki Klub Żeglarski Hestia
- Coached by: Tomasz Chamera
- Class: Dinghy
Medal record
Men's sailing
Representing Poland
Summer Universiade
| Gold medal – first place | 1999 Palma de Mallorca | Laser |

Maciej Tadeusz Grabowski (born 2 March 1978 in Gdynia) is a Polish sailor, who specialized in the Laser class. He had an impressive track record of two career European titles, and finished only in the top 16 in three editions of the Olympic Games (2000, 2004, and 2008), representing his nation Poland. Throughout his sporting career, Grabowski trained for Hestia Sopot Sailing Club (Polish: Sopocki Klub Żeglarski Hestia) and then became a member of the Polish Sailing Association under head coach Tomasz Chamera. As of June 2015, Grabowski is ranked outside the top 200 for the Laser class by the International Sailing Federation.

Grabowski made his Olympic debut at the 2000 Summer Olympics in Sydney, where he sailed a marvelous stretch to notch a seventh spot in the Laser class with a net grade of 86, but fell short of an Olympic medal chance by 22 points.

At the 2004 Summer Olympics in Athens, Grabowski finished the Laser regatta steadily from a poor start to take the eleventh place overall with 125 points, trailing behind Spain's Luis Martínez by a five-point shortfall.

Eight years after his Olympic debut, Grabowski qualified again for his third Polish squad, as a 30-year-old veteran, in the Laser class at the 2008 Summer Olympics in Beijing. Although he performed poorly at the 2007 ISAF World Championships, Grabowski had secured a selection on the Polish team through the assistance of IOC's Olympic Solidarity scholarship. Unlike two of his previous Games, Grabowski failed to improve his Olympic feat with a surprising sixteen-place finish in a fleet of forty-three sailors at the end of ten-race series, giving him only a grade of 131.
