= Tunte Cantero =

Spanish sailor

Personal information
- Nationality: Spanish
- Born: 9 August 1975 (age 51) Las Palmas de Gran Canaria, Spain

Sport
- Sport: Sailing
Medal record
Representing Spain
World Championships
Bronze medal – third place	2002 Cagliari	470
Summer Universiade
Silver medal – second place	1999 Palma de Mallorca	470

Tunte Cantero Artiles (born 9 August 1975) is a Spanish sailor. He competed in the men's 470 event at the 2000 Summer Olympics.
