= Yuka Yoshisako =

Japanese sailor

Personal information
- Nationality: Japanese
- Born: 28 August 1979 (age 45)

Sport
- Sport: Sailing

Yuka Yoshisako (吉迫 由香, Yoshisako Yuka, born 28 August 1979) is a Japanese sailor. She competed in the women's 470 event at the 2004 Summer Olympics.
