= Katherine Hopson =

British sailor

Personal information
- Nationality: British
- Born: 6 January 1982 (age 43); Croydon, England

Sport
- Sport: Sailing

Katherine Hopson (born 6 January 1982) is a British sailor. She competed in the women's 470 event at the 2004 Summer Olympics.
