= Kevin Burnham =

American sailor (1956–2020)

Personal information
- Full name: Kevin Lobdell Burnham
- Born: December 21, 1956 Hollis, Queens, New York City, U.S.
- Died: November 27, 2020 (aged 63) Miami Beach FL
- Height: 185 cm (6 ft 1 in)
- Weight: 70 kg (154 lb)

Sailing career
- Sport: Sailing
- Club: Key Biscayne Yacht Club
- Class: 470
Medal record
Men's sailing
Representing the United States
Olympic Games
Gold medal – first place	2004 Athens	470 class
Silver medal – second place	1992 Barcelona	470 class

Kevin Lobdell Burnham (December 21, 1956 – November 27, 2020) was an American two-time Olympic medalist in the sport of sailing. He won the silver medal in 1992 with Morgan Reeser in the 470 class.

Having competed in Olympic Trials in 1992, 1996, and 2004, Burnham never gave up on his dream of winning a gold medal. In the 2004 Olympics he won the gold medal with Paul Foerster in the 470 class. Kevin was the oldest gold medalist at the 2004 Olympic Games in Athens, Greece. Burnham was an 11-time U.S. champion in various boats. He was a sailing coach for various international teams, and he was the Head International 420 Coach for LIMA, The Long Island Mid Atlantic Sailing Team, from September 2015 until March 2017.

Burnham died on November 27, 2020, from complications of pulmonary disease. He was 63 years old.
