= Sailing at the 1999 Summer Universiade =

Sailing competition

Sailing at the XX Summer Universiade
- Venue: Bay of Palma

Sailing was contested at the 1999 Summer Universiade in Palma de Mallorca, Spain.

== Medal summary ==
* Host nation (Spain)

Rank	Nation	Gold	Silver	Bronze	Total
1	Spain (ESP)*	2	3	0	5
2	France (FRA)	2	0	0	2
2	Poland (POL)	2	0	0	2
4	Germany (GER)	0	1	0	1
4	Russia (RUS)	0	1	0	1
4	Ukraine (UKR)	0	1	0	1
7	Italy (ITA)	0	0	2	2
8	Great Britain (GBR)	0	0	1	1
8	Israel (ISR)	0	0	1	1
8	Netherlands (NED)	0	0	1	1
8	United States (USA)	0	0	1	1
Totals (11 entries)		6	6	6	18

== Medallists ==
Event	Gold	Silver	Bronze
Men's 470	Tomasz Stańczyk; Tomasz Jakubiak (POL)	Gustavo Martínez; Tunte Cantero (ESP)	Steven Hunt; Michael Miller (USA)
Men's Laser	Maciej Grabowski (POL)	Luis Martínez (ESP)	Diego Negri (ITA)
Men's Windsurf	Cédric Leroy (FRA)	Maksym Oberemko (UKR)	Adrian Jones (GBR)
Women's 470	Natalia Vía Dufresne; Sandra Azón (ESP)	Anna Basalkina; Victoria Oukraintseva (RUS)	Shany Kedmy; Anat Fabrikant (ISR)
Women's Europe	Vanesa Almeida (ESP)	Neus Garriga (ESP)	Larissa Nevierov (ITA)
Women's Windsurf	Justine Gardahaut (FRA)	Romy Kinzl (GER)	Margua Stalman (NED)

== Sources ==
- Sailing results at the 1999 Summer Universiade
