= Csaba Cserép =

Hungarian sailor

Personal information
- Nationality: Hungarian
- Born: 26 August 1982 (age 44) Budapest, Hungary

Sport
- Sport: Sailing

Csaba Cserép (born 26 August 1982) is a Hungarian sailor. He competed in the men's 470 event at the 2004 Summer Olympics.
