= Sara Wright =

Bermudian sailor

Personal information
- Nationality: Bermudian
- Born: 21 March 1969 (age 56)

Sport
- Sport: Sailing

Sara Wright (born 21 March 1969) is a Bermudian sailor. She competed in the Europe event at the 2000 Summer Olympics.
