= Tomeaka McTaggart =

Caymanian sailor

Personal information
- Nationality: Caymanian
- Born: 9 August 1975 (age 49); Bournemouth, England

Sport
- Sport: Sailing

Tomeaka McTaggart (born 9 August 1975) is a Caymanian sailor. She competed in the Europe event at the 2000 Summer Olympics.
