= Anna Basalkina =

Russian sailor

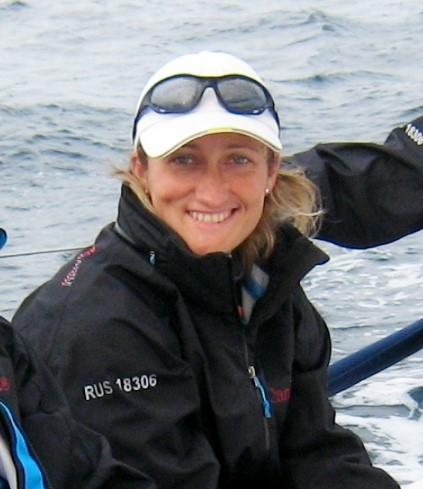
- Anna Basalkina in 2010

Personal information
- Nationality: Russian
- Born: 23 May 1974 (age 52) Rostov-on-Don, Soviet Union

Sport
- Sport: Sailing

Achievements and titles
- Olympic finals: 2000 Summer Olympics
Medal record
Representing Russia
Summer Universiade
Silver medal – second place	1999 Palma de Mallorca	470 class

Anna Basalkina (born 23 May 1974) is a Russian sailor. She competed in the women's 470 event at the 2000 Summer Olympics.
