= Guido Vignar =

Italian sailor

Personal information
- Nationality: Italian
- Born: 15 June 1969 (age 55); Locarno, Switzerland

Sport
- Sport: Sailing

Guido Vignar (born 15 June 1969) is an Italian sailor. He competed in the Star event at the 2004 Summer Olympics.
