= Mitsuko Satake =

Japanese sailor

Personal information
- Nationality: Japanese
- Born: 15 August 1976 (age 48)

Sport
- Sport: Sailing

Mitsuko Satake (佐竹 美都子, Satake Mitsuko, born 15 August 1976) is a Japanese sailor. She competed in the women's 470 event at the 2004 Summer Olympics.
