= Camilla Thomsen =

Danish handball player (born 1974)

Personal information
- Full name: Camilla Ingemann Thomsen
- Nationality: Danish
- Born: 19 November 1974 (age 51) Køge, Denmark
- Height: 180 cm (71 in)
- Weight: 71 kg (157 lb)

Sport
- Sport: Handball
- Position: Line Player

Senior clubs
- Years: Team
- 2001–2002: Ajax København
- 2002–2005: FC København Håndbold
National team
Years	Team	Apps	(Gls)
2002–2004	Denmark	56	(89)
Medal record
Women's handball
Representing Denmark
Olympic Games
Gold medal – first place	2004 Athens	Team competition
European Championship
Gold medal – first place	2002 Denmark	Team competition
Silver medal – second place	2004 Hungary	Team competition

Camilla Ingemann Thomsen (born 1 November 1974) is a Danish former team handball player and Olympic champion. She received a gold medal with the Danish national team at the 2004 Summer Olympics in Athens.

She started her career at Ajax København, but played almost her entire career at FC København. She won the EHF Cup Winners' Cup twice with FC København, in 03/04 and in 04/05. She retired in 2005 citing a lack of motivation as the reason.
