= Edmond Gibney =

Irish equestrian

Edmond Gibney, originally from Kilskyre, Kells, County Meath, Ireland (born 18 July 1974), is an Irish Olympic Three Day Eventing rider who represented Ireland in the 2004 Summer Olympics in Athens.

== Athens 2004 ==
=== Qualification ===
In 2001, Gibney rode Kings Highway at Blarney Castle in the CCI**, their first International Horse Trials together, where the pair finished 8th. In the same year they ended up in 23rd place in the CCI*** at Boekelo . In 2002 they completed the CCI*** at Punchestown and later that year the duo were to record 9th Place at the Blenheim CCI*** . As the Olympics grew near, in 2003 Gibney recorded 11th place at Belton Park in the Advanced section. However it was at the Badminton CCI**** in 2003 that the pair won the Glentrool Trophy in the cross country and ending up in 19th place overall.

=== Performance ===
Gibney had a poor showing at the 2004 Summer Olympics in Athens, ending with 152.6 penalty points, which put him in 62nd place. The Irish team ended in 8th place. A fall in the cross country section, (which was the front page of the Irish Independent newspaper at the time), scuppered Gibney's chance of a high placing.

== Injury and retirement ==
On 3 March 2007, Gibney, at 32 years old, was involved in a significant car crash in the South of England. The crash resulted in Gibney remaining in a coma for over a month in Southampton General Hospital. Once Gibney regained consciousness, he made a rapid recovery and was riding again that summer. At the time, he was competing on a number of horses up to intermediate level, finishing fifth in an intermediate section at Wilton on Lovejoy's Quest and winning a novice class at Borde Hill (2) on Skywalker II. He later took the decision to retire from competing at an international level.

== Early life in family ==
Born in County Louth, Ireland, Gibney initially worked in America where he went to the Atlanta Olympics as part of the American Equestrian Team before returning to Europe to concentrate on his own career.

In April 2012, Lion Na Bearnai, an Irish bred racehorse trained by Edmond Gibney's brother Thomas Gibney, won the Irish Grand National.
