= Gustavo Martínez (sailor) =

Spanish sailor

Personal information
- Full name: Gustavo Martínez Doreste
- Born: 21 March 1975 (age 51) Las Palmas, Spain

Sailing career
- Sport: Sailing
- Classes: 470, Tornado, J/80, 420, J/70
Medal record
Sailing
Representing Spain
World Championships
| Gold medal – first place | 1987 Holanda | Optimist team |
| Gold medal – first place | 1988 Francia | Optimist Team |
| Gold medal – first place | 1992 Israel | 420 |
| Silver medal – second place | 1993 Suecia | 420 |
| Silver medal – second place | 1994 Balaton | 470 |
| Silver medal – second place | 2009 Santander | J/80 |
| Bronze medal – third place | 2002 Marsella | 470 |
| Bronze medal – third place | 2002 Cagliari | 470 |
| Bronze medal – third place | 2003 Cádiz | 470 |
Summer Universiade
| Silver medal – second place | 1999 Palma de Mallorca | 470 |

Gustavo Martínez Doreste (Note: In this Spanish name, the first or paternal surname is Martínez and the second or maternal family name is Doreste.) (born 21 March 1975) is a Spanish sailor who competed in the 2000 and 2004 Summer Olympics.
