= Vendela Zachrisson-Santén =

Swedish sailor (born 1978)

Personal information
- Full name: Vendela Elin Birgitta Zachrisson-Santén
- Born: 11 June 1978 (age 48) Gothenburg, Sweden

Sailing career
- Sport: Sailing
- Class: 470
Medal record
Women's sailing
Representing Sweden
Olympic Games
Bronze medal – third place	2004 Athens	470 class

Vendela Elin Birgitta Zachrisson-Santén (née Zachrisson; born 11 June 1978) is a Swedish competitive sailor and Olympic medalist. She won a bronze medal in the 470 class at the 2004 Summer Olympics in Athens, together with Therese Torgersson.
