= Mads Møller Hansen =

Danish sailor

Mads Møller
Personal information
- Full name: Mads Møller Hansen
- Nationality: Danish
- Born: 20 July 1976 (age 50)
- Height: 176 cm (5 ft 9 in)
- Weight: 69 kg (152 lb)

Sailing career
- Sport: Sailing
- Club: Royal Danish Yacht Club
- Class: 470

Mads Møller Hansen (born 20 July 1976) is a Danish sailor. He competed in the men's 470 event at the 2004 Summer Olympics.
