= Sasha Harrison =

Irish equestrian

Personal information
- Nationality: Irish
- Born: 10 September 1975 (age 49); Craigavon, Northern Ireland

Sport
- Sport: Equestrian

Sasha Harrison (born 10 September 1975) is an Irish equestrian. She competed in two events at the 2004 Summer Olympics.
