= Ross Killian =

Irish sailor

Personal information
- Nationality: Irish
- Born: 18 July 1977 (age 47); Dublin, Ireland

Sport
- Sport: Sailing

Ross Killian (born 18 July 1977) is an Irish sailor. He competed in the men's 470 event at the 2004 Summer Olympics.
