= Paul Foerster =

American sailor

Personal information
- Full name: Paul Jeffrey Foerster
- Born: November 19, 1963 (age 62) Rangely, Colorado, U.S.

Sailing career
- Sport: Sailing
- College team: University of Texas at Austin
- Club: Austin Yacht Club; Rush Creek Yacht Club
Medal record
Sailing
Representing the United States
Olympic Games
Gold medal – first place	2004 Athens	470 class
Silver medal – second place	1992 Barcelona	Flying Dutchman
Silver medal – second place	2000 Sydney	470 class
Pan American Games
Bronze medal – third place	2007 Rio	Sunfish class
Silver medal – second place	2011 Guadalajara	Sunfish class

Paul Jeffrey Foerster (born November 19, 1963) is an American sailor.

He received All-American honors three times from the Inter-Collegiate Sailing Association sailing for the University of Texas at Austin and competed at four Olympic Games in sailing: 1988, 1992, 2000, and 2004, winning total of three Olympic medals during his career. In the Flying Dutchman (FD) class he was successful with Stephen Bourdow (Silver 1992), and then in the 470 class with Bob Merrick (silver, 2000) and Kevin Burnham (gold, 2004).

He now sails from Rush Creek Yacht Club in Heath, Texas, on Lake Ray Hubbard east of Dallas, Texas. Foerster was inducted into the National Sailing Hall of Fame in 2015. He has won the J/22 World Championship multiple times.
