= Luis Martínez (sailor) =

Spanish sailor (born 1973)

Personal information
- Full name: Luis Martínez Doreste
- Nationality: Spain
- Born: 4 March 1973 (age 53) Las Palmas, Spain
- Height: 1.85 m (6 ft 1 in)
- Weight: 80 kg (176 lb)

Sailing career
- Sport: Sailing
- Club: Real Club Náutico de Gran Canaria
- Coached by: Antón Garrote
- Class: Dinghy
Medal record
Representing Spain
Summer Universiade
| Silver medal – second place | 1999 Palma de Mallorca | Laser |

Luis Martínez Doreste (Note: In this Spanish name, the first or paternal surname is Martínez and the second or maternal family name is Doreste.) (born 4 March 1973 in Las Palmas) is a retired Spanish sailor, who specialized in the Laser class. He placed fourth in his respective category at the 2003 ISAF Sailing World Championships in Cádiz, and also obtained top eleven finishes in two editions of the Olympic Games (2000 and 2004). Throughout his sporting career, Martinez trained full-time for the Royal Gran Canaria YC in his native Las Palmas under his personal coach Antón Garrote. Coming from a sailing pedigree, Martinez also competed with his brother and 470 sailor Gustavo Martínez Doreste in two Olympics.

Martinez made his official debut at the 2000 Summer Olympics in Sydney, where he competed in the Laser class. He posted a net score of 97 to establish an eleventh spot in a vast fleet of forty-three sailors, falling behind the top ten by a tight, three-point margin.

At the 2004 Summer Olympics in Athens, Martinez qualified for his second Spanish team, as a 31-year-old, in the Laser class by placing fourth and obtaining a berth from the 2003 ISAF World Championships in Cádiz, Spain. Unlike his previous Olympics, Martinez compensated from an early surge in the opening to satisfy his place in the top ten with a score of 120.
