= Kenjiro Todoroki =

Japanese sailor (born 1975)

Olympic medal record

Men's Sailing
Bronze medal – third place	2004 Athens	Men's 470 class

Kenjiro Todoroki (轟 賢二郎, Todoroki Kenjirō; born September 1, 1975 in Chiba) is a sailing competitor from Japan. He won a bronze medal at the 2004 Athens Olympics with Kazuto Seki in the 470 (dinghy) class.
