= Blandine Boulekone =

Vanuatuan women's rights advocate

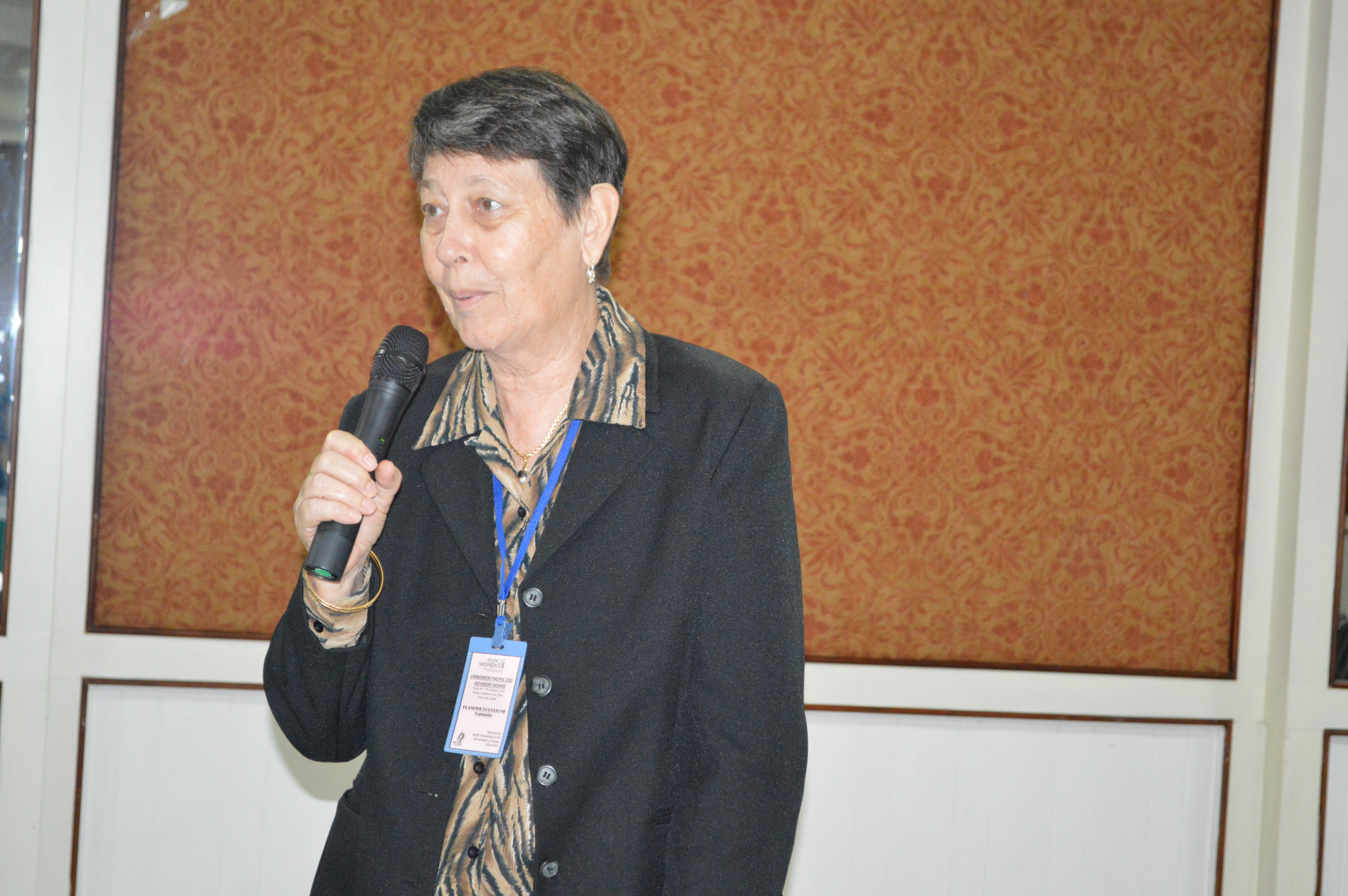
- Born: 1946 (age 79–80); Montromant, France
- Occupations: Women's rights advocate, head of health education

Blandine Boulekone is an advocate for women's rights in the island country of Vanuatu. She is the former president of the Vanuatu National Council of Women; a position she held from 2012 to 2014. She was also one of the founders of the Vanuatu Family Health Association, an organization that works in health education, family planning and sex education. Boulekone has held the position of executive director of the anti-corruption NGO group Transparency International in Vanuatu.

== Biography ==
Born in 1946 in Montromant, France, her parents moved to Bourail in 1951 and Blandine grew up in rural New Caledonia (now Vanuatu). After returning to France to study nursing in Lyon, she returned to Vanatau to work at the hospital in Noumea and then at the first Territorial Nursing School.

She met and married Vincent Boulekone, a law student and French-speaking native from the islands and would go on to have three children. The couple moved to Port Vila in 1973 and Blandine worked at the dispensary and then at the hospital, where she became head nurse, while her husband entered politics and became a member of Parliament. In 1980, when the French colony of New Hebrides became the Republic of Vanuatu, Blandine was named the head of health education at the Ministry of Health.

To help establish a health education system in Vanuatu, she founded the Vanuatu Family Health Association, which works across the country's various islands. She was also the executive director of the Vanuatu branch of Transparency International, and a founding member of the National Council of Women, of which she was subsequently president from 2012 to 2014. She became a naturalized Vanuatu citizen in 1990.

== Honors and distinctions ==
- Femme 3000 Entrepreneur award from the French Senate (2014)
- Knight of the National Order of the Legion of Honor by the government of France (2016)
