= Kazuto Seki =

Japanese sailor (born 1975)

Olympic medal record

Men's Sailing
Bronze medal – third place	2004 Athens	Men's 470 class

Kazuto Seki (関 一人, Seki Kazuto; born September 11, 1975 in Shizuoka) is a sailing competitor from Japan. He won a bronze medal at the 2004 Athens Olympics with Kenjiro Todoroki in the 470 (dinghy) class.
