= Tomasz Jakubiak =

Polish sailor

Personal information
- Nationality: Polish
- Born: 22 July 1978 (age 48) Mrągowo, Poland

Sport
- Sport: Sailing
Medal record
Representing Poland
World Championships
Bronze medal – third place	1999 Melbourne	470
Summer Universiade
Gold medal – first place	1999 Palma de Mallorca	470

Tomasz Zbigniew Jakubiak (born 22 July 1978) is a Polish sailor. He competed at the 2000 Summer Olympics and the 2004 Summer Olympics.
