= Jamie Hunt (sailor) =

New Zealand sailor

Personal information
- Born: 21 June 1979 (age 47)

Sport
- Country: New Zealand
- Sport: Sailing

Jamie Hunt (born 21 June 1979) is a New Zealand sailor. He competed at the 2004 Summer Olympics in Athens, in the men's 470 class.

His mother, Penny Hunt, represented New Zealand at the 1972 Summer Olympics, competing in the 400 m sprint, and at three Commonwealth Games.
