= Andrew Brown (sailor) =

New Zealand sailor

Personal information
- Born: 21 May 1977 (age 49)

Sport
- Country: New Zealand
- Sport: Sailing

Andrew Nathaniel Brown (born 21 May 1977) is a New Zealand sailor. He competed at the 2004 Summer Olympics in Athens, in the men's 470 class.
