= Mike Wolfs =

Canadian sailor

Medal record

Sailing

Representing Canada

Olympic Games
Silver medal – second place	2004 Athens	Star

Pan American Games
Bronze medal – third place	2007 Rio de Janeiro	J/24 class

Mike Wolfs (born 2 September 1970 in Port Credit, Ontario) is a Canadian sailor. He won a silver medal with Ross MacDonald at the 2004 Summer Olympics in the men's Star event.
