= Blandine Rasoanamary Voizy =

Malagasy politician

Blandine Rasoanamary Voizy is a Malagasy politician. A member of the National Assembly of Madagascar, she was elected as a member of the Tiako I Madagasikara party; she represents the second constituency of Toamasina.
