= Maria Coleman =

Irish sailor

Personal information
- Nationality: Ireland
- Born: 21 July 1969 (age 57) Birmingham, England, Great Britain
- Height: 1.73 m (5 ft 8 in)
- Weight: 65 kg (143 lb)

Sailing career
- Sport: Sailing
- Club: Royal Cork Sailing Club
- Class: Dinghy

Maria Coleman (born 21 July 1969) is an Irish former sailor, who specialized in the Europe class. She represented her nation Ireland in two editions of the Olympic Games (2000 and 2004), and was once ranked second in the world for her signature class by the International Sailing Federation, the highest ever placement for an Irish sailor. Coleman trained throughout most of her competitive sporting career for the Royal Cork Sailing Club.

Coleman made her Olympic debut in Sydney 2000, finishing a credible twelfth in the Europe class with a satisfying net grade of 86, but narrowly falling short from the top ten spot by a two-point deficit.

At the 2004 Summer Olympics in Athens, Coleman qualified for her second Irish team, as a lone female sailor, in the Europe class by placing fifteenth and receiving a berth from the 2003 ISAF World Championships in Cadiz. Coleman endured most of the races with mediocre marks, before finding her form at the back end of the opening series with her first and only victory over a fleet of twenty-four other sailors. Coleman's triumph on the last round of the series, however, was not enough to move her towards the top of the leaderboard, ending her Olympic campaign in eighteenth overall with a net grade of 147.
