= Blandine N'Goran =

Ivorian basketball player

Personal information
- Born: May 4, 1987 (age 39) Koumassi, Ivory Coast
- Listed height: 1.91 m (6 ft 3 in)

Career history
- ?: Abidjan Basket Club

Blandine N'Goran (born May 4, 1987) is an Ivorian female professional basketball player.
