= Lenka Šmídová =

Czech Olympic sailor (born 1975)

Medal record

Olympic Games

Representing Czech Republic

Women's Sailing
Silver medal – second place	2004 Athens	Europe class

Lenka Šmídová (Czech pronunciation: [ˈlɛŋka ˈʃmiːdovaː]; born 26 March 1975 in Havlíčkův Brod) is a Czech sailor. She won the Silver medal in the 2004 Summer Olympics in Athens in the Europe class.
