= Therese Torgersson =

Swedish sailor (born 1976)

Personal information
- Born: 28 March 1976 (age 50) Gothenburg, Sweden

Sailing career
- Sport: Sailing
- Class: 470
Medal record
Women's sailing
Representing Sweden
Olympic Games
Bronze medal – third place	2004 Athens	470 class

Therese Torgersson (born 28 March 1976 in Gothenburg) is a Swedish competitive sailor and Olympic medalist. She won a bronze medal in the 470 class at the 2004 Summer Olympics in Athens, together with Vendela Zachrisson.
