= Ross MacDonald (sailor) =

Canadian sailor

Medal record

Men's sailing

Representing Canada

Olympic Games
Silver medal – second place	2004 Athens	Star
Bronze medal – third place	1992 Barcelona	Star

David Ross MacDonald (born January 27, 1965) is a Canadian sailor. Born in Vancouver, he began sailing at the age of 11. He won a silver medal with Mike Wolfs at the 2004 Summer Olympics in the men's Star event, and a bronze with Eric Jespersen at the 1992 Summer Olympics in the same event.

MacDonald also sailed the 1997–98 Whitbread Round the World Race on Toshiba.
