= Serena Amato =

Argentine sailor (born 1974)

Personal information
- Born: 10 September 1974 (age 51) Olivos, Argentina

Sailing career
- Sport: Sailing
Medal record
Sailing
Representing Argentina
Olympic Games
Bronze medal – third place	2000 Sydney	Europe
Pan American Games
Gold medal – first place	1999 Winnipeg	Women's Europe

Serena Bibiana Amato (born 10 September 1974 in Olivos) is a sailor from Argentina, who won a bronze medal at the 2000 Summer Olympics in Sydney.
