= Kristian Skjødt Kjærgaard =

Danish sailor (born 1980)

Kristian Kjærgaard
Personal information
- Full name: Kristian Skjødt Kjærgaard
- Nationality: Danish
- Born: 18 September 1980 (age 46)
- Height: 182 cm (6 ft 0 in)
- Weight: 66 kg (146 lb)

Sailing career
- Sport: Sailing
- Club: Royal Danish Yacht Club
- Classes: ILCA 7, 470

Kristian Skjødt Kjærgaard (born 18 September 1980) is a Danish sailor. He competed in the men's 470 event at the 2004 Summer Olympics.
