= Signe Livbjerg =

Danish Olympic sailor (born 1980)

Medal record

Olympic Games

Representing Denmark

Women's Sailing
Bronze medal – third place	2004 Athens	Europe class

Signe Livbjerg (21 February 1980) is a Danish sailor. She won the bronze medal in the 2004 Summer Olympics in Athens in the Europe class.
