= Myriam Cutolo =

Italian yacht racer

Myriam Cutolo (born 29 October 1984) is an Italian yacht racer who competed in the 2004 Summer Olympics.
