= Blandine Rouille =

French yacht racer (born 1980)

Blandine Rouille (born 14 April 1980) is a French yacht racer who competed in the 2004 Summer Olympics.
