= Agios Kosmas Olympic Sailing Centre =

Sports venue in Athens, Greece

Coordinates: 37°52′40″N 23°43′40″E

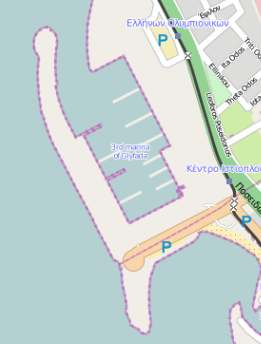
OpenStreetMap view Olympic harbor for the 2004 Summer Olympics in Athens

The Agios Kosmas Olympic Sailing Centre hosted the sailing events at the 2004 Summer Olympics in Athens, Greece. The center is located about four miles from downtown Athens along the coast. It was officially opened on August 2, 2004, a few weeks before the Olympics, though test events were conducted at the site in August 2002 and 2003. The center had a capacity of 1,600 for the medal ceremonies.

After the Olympics, the site was turned over to the private sector (Seirios AE), and will become a marina with a 1,000+ yacht capacity, as part of Athens' revitalized waterfront.
