= 1999 Summer Universiade =

Multi-sport event in Palma de Mallorca, Spain

XX Summer Universiade XX Universiada de verano XX Universíada d'estiu
- Host city: Palma de Mallorca, Spain
- Nations: 125 (estimated)
- Athletes: 4076
- Events: 142 in 12 sports
- Opening: 3 July 1999
- Closing: 13 July 1999
- Opened by: Infanta Elena, Duchess of Lugo
- Torch lighter: Miguel Ángel Nadal
- Main venue: Estadi de Son Moix
- Website: ulb.ac.be (archived)

The 1999 Summer Universiade, also known as the XX Summer Universiade, took place in Palma de Mallorca, Spain from 3 July to 13 July.

== Venues ==
- Estadi Son Moix — athletics, football (finals), ceremonies
- Arena Son Moix — volleyball
- Pavelló Son Hugo — swimming, diving, water polo
- Palma Arena — gymnastics, tennis
- Arena Sant Josep Obrer — volleyball, basketball
- Galatzo Arena — volleyball, basketball
- La salle Pont d'Inca — volleyball, basketball
- Pont d'Inca — water polo (finals), sailing

== Sports ==
- Athletics
- Basketball
- Diving
- Fencing
- Football
- Gymnastics
- Judo
- Sailing
- Swimming
- Tennis
- Volleyball
- Water polo

== Medal table ==
* Host nation (Spain)

Rank	Nation	Gold	Silver	Bronze	Total
1	United States (USA)	28	18	15	61
2	Russia (RUS)	14	18	11	43
3	Cuba (CUB)	12	2	12	26
4	Japan (JPN)	11	13	16	40
5	China (CHN)	9	6	10	25
6	Romania (ROU)	9	4	3	16
7	Ukraine (UKR)	7	7	8	22
8	Spain (ESP)*	7	6	13	26
9	Italy (ITA)	6	11	8	25
10	France (FRA)	5	3	8	16
11	Poland (POL)	4	7	2	13
12	Czech Republic (CZE)	4	5	4	13
13	South Korea (KOR)	2	4	8	14
14	Germany (GER)	2	4	2	8
15	Canada (CAN)	2	3	6	11
16	Australia (AUS)	2	3	2	7
17	Netherlands (NED)	2	3	1	6
18	Belarus (BLR)	2	3	0	5
19	Hungary (HUN)	2	2	2	6
20	Chinese Taipei (TPE)	2	2	0	4
21	South Africa (RSA)	2	1	3	6
22	Brazil (BRA)	2	0	5	7
23	Great Britain (GBR)	1	3	6	10
24	Mexico (MEX)	1	2	0	3
25	Belgium (BEL)	1	1	2	4
26	Portugal (POR)	1	1	1	3
27	Mongolia (MGL)	1	0	1	2
28	Latvia (LAT)	1	0	0	1
29	Austria (AUT)	0	2	1	3
30	Slovenia (SLO)	0	2	0	2
31	Switzerland (SUI)	0	1	2	3
32	Argentina (ARG)	0	1	1	2
32	Greece (GRE)	0	1	1	2
32	Israel (ISR)	0	1	1	2
35	FR Yugoslavia (YUG)	0	1	0	1
35	Jamaica (JAM)	0	1	0	1
35	Qatar (QAT)	0	1	0	1
35	Uzbekistan (UZB)	0	1	0	1
39	Slovakia (SVK)	0	0	4	4
40	Georgia (GEO)	0	0	2	2
41	Croatia (CRO)	0	0	1	1
41	Denmark (DEN)	0	0	1	1
41	Moldova (MDA)	0	0	1	1
41	Nigeria (NGA)	0	0	1	1
41	Norway (NOR)	0	0	1	1
41	Senegal (SEN)	0	0	1	1
Totals (46 entries)		142	144	167	453
