= Israel at the FISU World University Games =

Israel's competition at the Universiade

Israel at the Summer Universiade
- IOC code: ISR
- Medals: Gold 4 Silver 7 Bronze 5 Total 16

Summer Universiade appearances (overview)
- 1997; 1999; 2001; 2003; 2005; 2007; 2009; 2011; 2013; 2015; 2017; 2019; 2021; 2025; 2027

Israel at the Universiade has led to 17 medals, 16 at the Summer Universiade and 1 at the Winter Universiade.

== Medals ==
=== Medals by games ===
Games	Gold	Silver	Bronze	Total
1997 Summer	0	1	0	1
1999 Summer	0	1	1	2
2001 Summer	1	1	0	2
2003 Summer	0	0	2	2
2007 Summer	0	1	0	1
2009 Summer	0	1	1	2
2009 Winter	1	0	0	1
2011 Summer	0	1	0	1
2013 Summer	2	1	1	4
2019 Summer	0	0	1	1
2025 Summer	1	0	0	1
Totals (11 entries)	5	7	6	18

=== Medals by sport ===
Summer
Games	Gold	Silver	Bronze	Total
Athletics	2	1	0	3
Belt wrestling	1	0	1	2
Fencing	0	1	1	2
Gymnastics	0	1	0	1
Sailing	0	0	1	1
Sambo	1	1	0	2
Swimming	0	3	2	5
Taekwondo	0	0	1	1
Totals (8 entries)	4	7	6	17

Winter
Games	Gold	Silver	Bronze	Total
Figure skating	1	0	0	1
Totals (1 entries)	1	0	0	1

=== Medals by year ===
Summer

Sport	1997	1999	2001	2003	2007	2009	2011	2013	2019	Total
Athletics			2							2
Belt wrestling								2		2
Fencing					1				1	2
Gymnastics						1				1
Sailing		1								1
Sambo								2		2
Swimming	1	1		1		1	1			5
Taekwondo				1						1
Total	1	2	2	2	1	2	1	4		16

Winter

Sport	2009	Total
Figure skating	1	1
Total	1	1

== List of medalists ==
Medal	Name	Games	Sport	Event
Silver	Michael Halika	1997 Summer	Swimming	Men's 400 m individual medley
Bronze	Shany Kedmy; Anat Fabrikant	1999 Summer	Sailing	470
Silver	Michael Halika	1999 Summer	Swimming	Men's 400 m individual medley
Silver	Wodage Zvadya	2001 Summer	Athletics	Men's half marathon
Gold	Aleksandr Averbukh	2001 Summer	Athletics	Men's pole vault
Bronze	Michael Halika	2003 Summer	Swimming	Men's 400 m individual medley
Bronze	Nir David Moriah	2003 Summer	Taekwondo	Men's 72 kg
Silver	Noam Mills	2007 Summer	Fencing	Women's Individual Épée
Silver	Irina Risenzon	2009 Summer	Gymnastics	Women's rhythmic gymnastics individual hoop
Bronze	Guy Barnea	2009 Summer	Swimming	Men's 50m Backstroke
Gold	Alexandra Zaretski; Roman Zaretski	2009 Winter	Figure skating	Ice dancing
Silver	Guy Barnea	2011 Summer	Swimming	Men's 50m Backstroke
Gold	Alice Schlesinger	2013 Summer	Belt wrestling	Women's Freestyle 66 kg
Bronze	Gregory Rudelson	2013 Summer	Belt wrestling	Men's Classic Style +100 kg
Gold	Alice Schlesinger	2013 Summer	Sambo	Women's Sambo 64 kg
Silver	Peter Paltchik	2013 Summer	Sambo	Men's Sambo 100 kg
Bronze	Nickol Tal	2019 Summer	Fencing	Women's Individual Épée
