= 505 World Championship =

Sailing World Championship

The 505 World Championships is an annual international sailing regatta. The event is organized by the host club on behalf of the International Class Association and recognized by World Sailing, the sports IOC recognized governing body. The championships typically take place in Europe every other year and then elsewhere in the world on the alternating years.

== Events ==
Event			Host			Athlete			Boats				Ref.
Ed.	Dates	Year	Host club	Location	Country	No.	Nat.	Cont.	No.			Mix.	Ref.
1	-	1956		La Baule	France								
2	-	1957		La Baule	France								
3	23-26 Aug	1958		La Baule	France								
4	-	1959	Royal Cork Yacht Club	Crosshaven	Ireland								
5	3-8 Aug	1960	Cercle Nautique de La Baule	La Baule	France								
6	-	1961		Weymouth, England	United Kingdom								
7	-	1962		La Baule	France								
8	-	1963		Larchmont, New York	United States								
9	-	1964	Royal Cork Yacht Club	Crosshaven	Ireland								
10	22 Aug to 4 Sept	1965	Yacht Club de Tanger	Tangier	Morocco								
11	21-27 Mar	1966	Brighton and Seacliff Yacht Club	Seacliff, Adelaide	Australia								
12	-	1967		La Baule	France								
13	25 Aug to 1 Sept	1968		Kiel, Germany	West Germany								
14	12-18 Jan	1969	Yacht Club Olivos	Buenos Aires, Argentina	Argentina								
15	23-28 Aug	1970		Plymouth, England	United Kingdom								
16	20-24 Aug	1971	Santa Cruz Yacht Club	Santa Cruz, California	United States								
17	12-19 Aug	1972		Hanko, Finland	Finland								
18	14-28 Nov	1973	Royal Hong Kong Yacht Club	Causeway Bay, Hong Kong	Hong Kong								
19	10-24 Aug	1974	Göteborgs Kungliga Segel Sällskap	Marstrand, Sweden	Sweden								
20	5-12 Oct	1975		Hamilton	Bermuda								
21	11-17 Nov	1976		Lake Macquarie, New South Wales	Australia								
22	-	1977		La Rochelle	France								
23	18-27 Aug	1978	Skovshoved Sejlklub	Copenhagen	Denmark								
24	-	1979		Durban, South Africa	South Africa								
25	-	1980	Hayling Island Sailing Club	Hayling Island	United Kingdom								
26	-	1981	St. Francis Yacht Club	San Francisco, California	United States								
27	13-20 Aug	1982	Royal Cork Yacht Club	Cork	Ireland								
28	1-12 Mar	1983		Adelaide, South Australia	Australia								
29	28 June to 7 Aug	1984		Gromitz	West Germany								
30	11-25 Oct	1985	Enoshima Olympic Yacht Harbour	Enoshima	Japan								
31	24 July to 2 Aug	1986	Sociéte des Régates Rochelaises	La Rochelle	France	51	11	4	87				
32	12–20 July	1987	Helsingfors Segelklubb	Helsinki	Finland	19	6	3	74				
33	2-17 Aug	1988	Middle Harbour Yacht Club	Sydney	Australia	180	11	4	90				
34	-	1989	Felixstowe Ferry	Felixstowe	United Kingdom	17	6	3	72				
35	-	1990	Portsmouth Olympic Harbour	Kingston, Ontario	Canada	152	9	4	76				
36	1-8 Aug	1991	Göteborgs Kungliga Segel Sällskap	Marstrand	Sweden	17	6	3	83				
37	14-22 Aug	1992		Santa Cruz, California	United States	42	7	3	85				
38	30 Aug to 7 Sept	1993		Travemunde	Germany	15	5	2	3				
39	-	1994		Durban	South Africa	10	5	3	39				
40	27 July to 4 Aug	1995	Mounts Bay Sailing Club	Mounts Bay	United Kingdom	212	13	4	106				
41	11-18 Apr	1996	Townsville Sailing Club	Townsville	Australia	192	11	5	96				
42	13-22 Aug	1997	Gilleleje Sejlklub	Gilleleje	Denmark	158	11	3	79				
43	19-25 Sept	1998	Hyannis Yacht Club	Hyannis, Massachusetts	United States	212	8	3	106				
44	4–10 July	1999	Ecole Nationale de Voile	Quiberon, France	France	314	13	4	157				
45	11-23 Nov	2000	Point Yacht Club	Durban, South Africa	South Africa	112	11	4	56				
46	8 to 28 Aug	2001	Clube Naval de Cascais	Cascais	Portugal	210	14	4	105				
47	2-12 Dec	2002	Fremantle Sailing Club	Fremantle	Australia	196	10	4	98	93	1	4	
48	26 July to 1 Aug	2003	MALMÖ SEGEL SÄLLSKAP	Malmö	Sweden	170	13	4	85				
49	13-20 Aug	2004	Santa Cruz Yacht Club	Santa Cruz, California	United States	204	8	3	102				
50	20-26 Aug	2005	Warnemunder Segelclub ev Yachthafen Mittlemole	Warnemuende	Germany	340	13	4	170				
51	27 July to 4 Aug	2006	Hayling Island Sailing Club	Hayling Island	United Kingdom	222	13	3	111				
52	22 Jan to 2 Feb	2007	Brighton and Seacliff Yacht Club	Seacliff, Adelaide, SA	Australia	184	13	4	92				
53	10-17 Oct	2008	Club Canottierri Roggero di Lauria	Mondello, Palermo, Sicily	Italy	246	13	3	123				
54	23-30 Aug	2009	St. Francis Yacht Club	San Francisco, California	United States	197	10	4	98				
55	10-16 Aug	2010	Kalovig Saileig Centre	Aarhus	Denmark	242	11	4	121				
56	20 Mar to 1 Apr	2011	Hamilton Island Yacht Club	Hamilton Island, Queensland	Australia	170	9	4	85				
57	17–27 July	2012	Societe des Regates Rochelaises	La Rochelle, Charente-Maritime	France	370	14	4	185				
58	22 Apr to 3 May	2013	Barbados Yacht Club	Carlisle Bay	Barbados	142	9	3	71				
59	13-22 Aug	2014	Kieler Woche	Kiel	Germany	306	14	5	153				
60	25 Mar to 3 Apr	2015	Algoa Bay Yacht Club	Port Elizabeth	South Africa	72	6	4	36				
61	25 July to 5 Aug	2016	Weymouth and Portland National Sailing Academy	Isle of Portland	United Kingdom	260	14	4	130				
62	20-29 Sept	2017	Severn Sailing Association	Annapolis, Maryland	United States	174	12	4	87	74	2	11	
63	22–27 July	2018	Polish Yachting Association	Gdynia	Poland	254	14	4	127	104	3	20	
64	2-7 Jan	2019	Fremantle Sailing Club	Fremantle	Australia	178	11	4	89	80	2	7	
N/A	13-20 Aug	2020	Båstad Boat and Sailing Society	Torekov	Sweden	CANCELLED DUE TO COVID-19							
N/A	26 Oct to 5 Nov	2021	Royal Bermuda Yacht Club	Hamilton	Bermuda	CANCELLED DUE TO COVID-19							
65	3-13 Aug	2022	Royal Cork Yacht Club	Cork	Ireland	152	11	4	76	69	0	7	
N/A	25 Sept to 1 Oct	2023	Santa Cruz Yacht Club	Santa Cruz, California	United States	CANCELLED							
66	24 Sept to 2 Oct	2023	St. Francis Yacht Club	Berkeley, San Francisco, California	United States	118	8	3	59	55	1	3	
67	1-10 Aug	2024	Varberg Segelsalskap	Varberg	Sweden	190	14	4	95				
68	2-7 Jan	2025	Adelaide Sailing Club	West Beach, Adelaide, SA	Australia	140	6	3	70	65	2	3	
69	6-11 July	2026	Hayling Island Sailing Club	Hayling Island	United Kingdom	180	10	4	89	80	1	8	

== Multiple World Champions ==
Compiled from the data below the table includes up to and including 2026.

Ranking	Sailor	Gold	Silver	Bronze	Total	No. Entries (1)	Ref.
1	Mike Martin (USA)	5	5	3	13	24	
2	Krister Bergström (SWE)	5	3	3	11	17	
3	Wolfgang Hunger (GER)	5	0	4	9	14	
4	Peter Colclough (GBR)	4	2	2	8	13	
5	Holger Jess (GER)	4	0	1	5	21	
6	Mike Holt (USA)	3	5	0	8	26	
7	Adam Lowry (USA)	3	1	0	4	7	
8	Chris Nicholson (AUS)	3	0	1	4	9	
9	Darren Nicholson (AUS)	3	0	0	3	11	
10	Carl Smit (USA)	2	4	1	7	16	
11	Olle Wenrup (SWE)	2	1	2	5	30	
12	Robin Farrant (GBR)	2	1	1	4	5	
12	Derek Farrant (GBR)	2	1	1	4	9	
14	Paul Bert Elvstrom (DEN)	2	1	0	3	4	
14	Cameron Lewis (USA)	2	1	0	3	8	
14	Phil Brown (GBR)	2	1	0	3	4	
17	Julien Kleiner (GER)	2	0	3	5	9	
18	Marcel Buffet (FRA)	2	0	2	4	19	
19	Ian Mitchell (GBR)	2	0	1	3	14	
20	Mark Upton-Brown (GBR)	2	0	0	2	14	
20	Larry Marks (GBR)	2	0	0	2	5	
20	Jan Saugmann (DEN)	2	0	0	2	23	
20	Victor Deschamps (GBR)	2	0	0	2	2	
24	Chris Hough (AUS)	2	0	0	2	2	
24	P Poullain (DEN)	2	0	0	2	2	
24	Patrick Wolff (FRA)	2	0	0	2	2	
24	Per Anders Hallberg (SWE)	2	0	0	2	3	
28	Howard Hamlin (USA)	1	9	5	15	43	

(1) Full results for some early years are not available so this could be an under estimation

== Medalist ==
Year	Gold	Silver	Bronze	Ref.
1956 La Baule	France; Jacques Lebrun; P. Harrinkouck			
1957 La Baule	Denmark; Paul Elvstrøm; Pierre Poullain			
1958 La Baule	Denmark; Paul Elvstrøm; Pierre Poullain			
1959 Cork	France; Marcel Buffet; Patrick Wolff			
1960 La Baule	France; Marcel Buffet; Patrick Wolff			
1961 Weymouth	France; Jean-Claude Cornu; Daniel Gouffier			
1962 La Baule	Great Britain; Keith Paul; Bill Moakes			
1963 Larchmont	Australia; Brian Price; Chris Hough	United States; Henry Schefter; Brian Smart		
1964 Cork	Australia; John Parrington; Chris Hough	Great Britain; Derek Farrant; Robin Farrant	France; Mathieu Tanon; TBA	
1965 Tanger	Great Britain; Derek Farrant; Robin Farrant			
1966 Adelaide	Australia; Jim Hardy; Max Whitnall	Denmark; Paul Elvstrøm; Malcolm 'Pip' Pearson	Australia; John B. Cuneo; A. Martin	
1967 La Baule	France; Bernard Moret; René Morch			
1968 Kiel	France; Marcel Troupel; Philippe Lanaverre	France; Yves Pajot; Marc Pajot	France; Marcel Buffet; Daniel Nottet	
1969 Buenos Aires	Great Britain; Larry Marks; Victor Deschamps	Ireland; Cudmore; Bruen	Argentina; Domato; Sidmann	
1970 Plymouth	Great Britain; Larry Marks; Victor Deschamps	Great Britain; Gordon Wilson; Philip Wilson	Great Britain; Derek Farrant; Robin Farrant	
1971 Santa Cruz	Great Britain; Derek Farrant; Robin Farrant	United States; Dave Vickland; Everett Palmer	Great Britain; Peter Bainbridge	
1972 Hanko	France; Nicolas Loday; Nicolas Fedorenko	France; Bruno Levesque; Jean-Luc Bapst	Finland; Kari Wilén; Jyri Wilén	
1973 Hong Kong	Great Britain; Peter White; John Davies	United States; Dennis Surtees; Stephen Owens	France; Yves Pajot; Yvon Kergreis	
1974 Marstrand	France; Yves Pajot; Marc Pajot	United States; Dennis Surtees; Stephen Owens	Sweden; Björn Arnesson; Göran Andersson	
1975 Hamilton	Great Britain; John Loveday; Lewis Dann	France; Jean-Marie Danielou; François Richard	France; Marcel Buffet; Thierry Desfarges	
1976 Lake Macquarie	Great Britain; Peter Colclough; Steve Jones	Australia; Terry Kyrwood; Reg Crick	Australia; R. Nonris; I. Rors	
1977 La Rochelle	Great Britain; Peter Colclough; Phil Brown	United States; Ethan Bixby; Larry Tuttle	United States; Steve Taylor; Stan Honey	
1978 Copenhagen	Great Britain; Peter Colclough; Phil Brown	Denmark; Jørgen Bojsen-Møller; Jacob Bojsen-Møller	Australia; Terry Kyrwood; Reg Crick	
1979 Durban	United States; Steve Taylor; David Penfield	United States; Dennis Surtees; Paul Cayard	United States; Dan Thompson	
1980 Hayling Island	United States; Steve Benjamin; Tucker Edmundson	United States; Jon Andron; Howie Hamlin	Great Britain; Peter Colclough; Harold Barnes	
1981 San Francisco	United States; Ethan Bixby; Cam Lewis	United States; Steve Benjamin; Tucker Edmundson	Denmark; Jørgen Schønherr; Anders Kæmpe	
1982 Cork	United States; Gary Knapp; Cam Lewis	Great Britain; Peter Colclough; Harold Barnes	United States; Steve Benjamin; Tucker Edmundson	
1983 Adelaide	Australia; Terry Kyrwood; Reg Crick	Australia; Gary Bruniges; Greg Gardiner	Australia; Geoff Kyrwood; Bob Kyrwood	
1984 Gromitz	Australia; Dean Blatchford; Tom Woods	Great Britain; Peter Colclough; Harold Barnes	United States; Howie Hamlin; Rick Rattray	
1985 Enoshima	Australia; Gary Bruniges; Greg Gardiner	Australia; Dean Blatchford; Tom Woods	Great Britain; Peter Colclough; Harold Barnes	
1986 La Rochelle	Great Britain; Peter Colclough; Harold Barnes	Sweden; Krister Bergström; Magnus Holmberg	Sweden; Jan Bergström; Bengt Zachrisson	
1987 Helsinki	Sweden; Krister Bergström; Olle Wenrup	Denmark; Jørgen Holm; Finn Jensen	Australia; Dean Blatchford; Tom Woods	
1988 Sydney	Sweden; Krister Bergström; Olle Wenrup	Australia; Dean Blatchford; Tom Woods	Australia; Stephen McConaghy; Andrew McConaghy	
1989 Felixstowe	Sweden; Krister Bergström; Per Anders Hallberg	Great Britain; Peter Colclough; Phil Brown	United States; Bruce Edwards; David Shelton	
1990 Kingston	Denmark; Jørgen Schønherr; Anders Kæmpe	France; Philippe Boite; Jean-Luc Muzellec	Sweden; Krister Bergström; Olle Wenrup	
1991 Marstrand	Sweden; Krister Bergström; Per Anders Hallberg	Great Britain; Ian Pinnell; Mark Darling	Denmark; Jørgen Schønherr; Anders Kæmpe	
1992 Santa Cruz	Australia; Chris Nicholson; Darren Nicholson	Denmark; Jørgen Schønherr; Michael Poulsen	United States; Bruce Edwards; David Shelton	
1993 Travemünde	Great Britain; Ian Barker; Tim Hancock	Great Britain; Paul Brotherton; Bill Masterman	Denmark; Jørgen Schønherr; Michael Poulsen	
1994 Durban	Australia; Chris Nicholson; Darren Nicholson	Great Britain; Ian Barker; Tim Hancock	Denmark; Jørgen Schønherr; Michael Poulsen	
1995 Mounts Bay	Great Britain; Jeremy Robinson; Bill Masterman	Sweden; Krister Bergström; Thomas Moss	Sweden; Ebbe Rosén; Olle Wenrup	
1996 Townsville	Great Britain; Paul Towers; Dan Johnson	United States; Howie Hamlin; Cam Lewis	Great Britain; Ian Barker; Daniel Cripps	
1997 Gilleleje	Great Britain; Mark Upton-Brown; Ian Mitchell	Sweden; Ebbe Rosén; Olle Wenrup	United States; Howie Hamlin; Mike Martin	
1998 Hyannis	United States; Nick Trotman; Mike Mills	United States; Howie Hamlin; Mike Martin	Great Britain; Ian Barker; Daniel Cripps	
1999 Quiberon	United States; Howie Hamlin; Mike Martin	United States; Andy Beeckman; Ben Benjamin	Denmark; Jørgen Schønherr; Anders Kæmpe	
2000 Durban	Sweden; Krister Bergström; Thomas Moss	United States; Mike Martin; Steve Bourdow	United States; Howie Hamlin; Peter Alarie	
2001 Cascais	Germany; Wolfgang Hunger; Holger Jess	Great Britain; Ian Pinnell; Tim Hancock	Sweden; Krister Bergström; Thomas Moss	
2002 Fremantle	Australia; Chris Nicholson; Darren Nicholson	United States; Howie Hamlin; Mike Martin	Sweden; Krister Bergström; Thomas Moss	
2003 Malmö	Germany; Wolfgang Hunger; Holger Jess	Sweden; Krister Bergström; Johan Barne	United States; Howie Hamlin; Peter Alarie	
2004 Santa Cruz	United States; Morgan Larson; Trevor Baylis	United States; Howie Hamlin; Peter Alarie	United States; Mike Martin; Jeff Nelson	
2005 Warnemünde	Germany; Wolfgang Hunger; Holger Jess	United States; Mike Martin; Jesse Falsone	Germany; Dietrich Scheder-Bieschin; Reiner Görge	
2006 Hayling Island	Great Britain; Mark Upton-Brown; Ian Mitchell	United States; Howie Hamlin; Jeff Nelson	Germany; Jens Findel; Johannes Tellen	
2007 Adelaide	Denmark; Jan Saugmann; Morten Ramsbæk	United States; Howie Hamlin; Fritz Lanzinger	Australia; Sandy Higgins; Paul Marsh	
2008 Palermo	Great Britain; Ian Pinnell; Carl Gibbon	United States; Howie Hamlin; Andy Zinn	Germany; Wolfgang Hunger; Julien Kleiner	
2009 San Francisco	United States; Mike Martin; Jeff Nelson	United States; Mike Holt; Carl Smit	Australia; Chris Nicholson; Casey Smith	
2010 Aarhus	Wolfgang Hunger (GER); Julien Kleiner (GER)	Jørgen Bojsen-Møller (DEN); Jacob Bojsen-Møller (DEN)	Great Britain; Ian Pinnell; Ian Mitchell	
2011 Hamilton Island	Wolfgang Hunger (GER); Julien Kleiner (GER)	United States; Mike Holt; Carl Smit	Australia; Sandy Higgins; Paul Marsh	
2012 La Rochelle	Denmark; Jan Saugmann; Martin Görge	Jørgen Bojsen-Møller (DEN); Jacob Bojsen-Møller (DEN)	Germany; Christian Kellner; Martin Schoeler	
2013 Barbados	Germany; Claes Lehmann; Leon Oehme	Germany; Stefan Böhm; Gerald Roos	Germany; Wolfgang Hunger; Holger Jess	
2014 Kiel	United States; Mike Holt; Rob Woelfel	Australia; Peter Nicholas; Luke Payne	Germany; Wolfgang Hunger; Julien Kleiner	
2015 Port Elizabeth	United States; Mike Holt; Carl Smit	Great Britain; Ian Pinnell; Johannes Tellen	United States; Ted Conrads; Brian Haines	
2016 Weymouth	United States; Mike Martin; Adam Lowry	United States; Mike Holt; Carl Smit	Germany; Wolfgang Hunger; Julien Kleiner	
2017 Annapolis	United States; Mike Holt; Carl Smit	United States; Mike Martin; Adam Lowry	Great Britain; Andy Smith; Roger Gilbert	
2018 Gdynia	Germany; Lutz Stengel; Holger Jess	United States; Mike Holt; Carl Smit	Germany; Jan-Philipp Hofmann; Felix Björn Brockerhoff	
2019 Fremantle	USA 9106; Mike Martin (USA); Adam Lowry (USA)	USA 9072; Mike Holt (USA); Carl Smit (USA)	USA 9004; Parker Shinn (USA); Eric Anderson (USA)	
2020 Båstad	Canceled due to the COVID-19 pandemic.			
2021 Bermuda	Canceled due to the COVID-19 pandemic.			
2022 Cork	United States; Stuart McNay; Caleb Paine	Great Britain; Nathan Batchelor; Sam Pascoe	Peter Nicholas (AUS); Luke Payne (AUS)	
2023	USA 9106; Mike Martin (USA); Adam Lowry (USA)	USA 9248; Eric Anderson (USA); Nicholas Baird (USA)	USA 9072; Mike Holt (USA); Carl Smit (USA)	
2024	Peter Nicholas (AUS); Luke Payne (AUS)	Jan-Philipp Hofmann (GER); Felix Brockerhoff (GER)	Howard Hamlin (USA); Andrew Zinn (USA)	
2025	AUS-9272; Sandy Higgins (AUS); Paul Marsh (AUS)	AUS-8801; Peter Nicholas (AUS); Luke Payne (AUS)	GBR-9253; Nathan Batchelor (GBR); Sam Pascoe (GBR)	
2026	GER-9251; Jan-Philipp Hofmann (GER); Felix Brockerhoff (GER)	USA-9262; Howard Hamlin (USA); Andrew Zinn (USA)	GBR-9274; Paul Brotherton (GBR); James Fawcett (GBR)	
