= Sailing at the 2000 Summer Olympics – Men's 470 =

Sailing at the Olympics

Men's 470 at the Games of the XXVII Olympiad
- 470 class dinghy
- Venue: Darling Point Cruising Yacht Club of Australia, Sydney
- Date: First race: 20 September 2000; Last race: 28 September 2000
- Competitors: 29 Boats; 58 Sailors from 29 nations

Medalists
1st place, gold medalist(s)		Tom King; Mark Turnbull	Australia
2nd place, silver medalist(s)		Paul Foerster; Robert Merrick	United States
3rd place, bronze medalist(s)		Juan de la Fuente; Javier Conte	Argentina

These are the results of the men's 470 competition in sailing at the 2000 Summer Olympics.

== Results ==
Results of individual races
Rank	Nation	Athletes	1	2	3	4	5	6	7	8	9	10	11	Total	Net
Gold medal	Australia	Tom King; Mark Turnbull	5	1	2	-14	7	10	8	1	2	-11	2	63	38
Silver medal	United States	Paul Foerster; Robert Merrick	8	9	4	11	1	1	6	-12	-13	1	1	67	42
Bronze medal	Argentina	Javier Conte; Juan de la Fuente	11	6	8	5	OCS (-30)	6	3	7	1	-17	10	104	57
4	Great Britain	Nicholas Rogers; Joe Glanfield	4	3	17	1	8	-18	-19	6	6	6	7	95	58
5	Portugal	Álvaro Marinho; Miguel Nunes	1	4	6	7	5	9	5	15	-25	15	-16	108	67
6	Ukraine	Yevhen Braslavets; Ihor Matviyenko	2	5	DSQ (-30)	OCS (-30)	6	2	4	9	11	DSQ (30)	3	132	72
7	New Zealand	Simon Cooke; Peter Nicholas	6	-15	9	12	10	12	-15	3	3	13	8	106	76
8	Greece	Andreas Kosmatopou; Konstantinos Trigkonis	13	7	-21	6	3	8	-24	19	14	2	6	123	78
9	Slovenia	Tomaž Čopi; Mitja Margon	-23	13	3	4	12	13	-25	5	15	9	4	126	78
10	Spain	Gustavo Martínez; Tunte Cantero	17	11	15	9	-18	3	12	2	8	4	-21	120	81
11	Russia	Dmitry Berezkin; Mikhail Krutikov	9	17	1	2	14	-26	11	11	7	10	-29	137	82
12	Sweden	Johan Molund; Mattias Rahm	18	10	7	OCS (-30)	2	-29	1	4	19	20	15	155	96
13	Israel	Eli Zukerman; Elad Ronen	3	12	12	OCS (-30)	19	11	10	16	-23	7	9	152	99
14	France	Gildas Philippe; Tanguy Cariou	10	2	5	16	OCS (-30)	-23	2	22	17	18	19	164	111
15	South Korea	Kim Dae-young; Jung Sung-ahn	16	16	13	10	16	17	13	DNF (-30)	-20	12	12	175	125
16	Finland	Petri Leskinen; Kristian Heinilä	-25	23	10	3	17	4	23	20	-28	3	24	180	127
17	Germany	Stefan Meister; Frank Thieme	20	18	-24	-26	24	15	7	13	4	24	5	180	130
18	Japan	Eiichiro HamazakiYuji Miyai	19	-22	-26	13	4	16	17	18	10	16	20	181	133
19	Italy	Matteo Ivaldi; Francesco Ivaldi	12	8	16	22	21	-28	9	10	-26	19	22	193	139
20	Poland	Tomasz Stańczyk; Tomasz Jakubiak	OCS (-30)	-27	25	25	26	5	14	8	5	23	13	201	144
21	Belarus	Igor Ivashintsov; Mikhail Protasevich	15	-29	20	20	23	14	18	DSQ (-30)	24	5	14	212	153
22	Estonia	Tõnu Tõniste; Toomas Tõniste	7	14	-28	17	OCS (-30)	25	16	14	21	25	18	215	157
23	Mexico	Manuel Villareal; Santiago Hernández	21	21	-23	8	22	22	DNF (-30)	23	9	22	11	212	159
24	Croatia	Toni Bulaja|Ivan Bulaja	OCS (-30)	19	18	19	11	19	22	21	16	-27	17	219	162
25	Jamaica	Andrew Gooding; Sean Nunes	22	25	14	15	9	-27	21	-27	18	14	26	218	164
26	Brazil	Alexandre ParadedaAndré Fonseca	14	-24	11	21	15	20	-27	24	22	21	23	222	171
27	Switzerland	Lukas Erni; Simon Brügger	OCS (-30)	-28	27	24	20	7	20	26	27	8	25	242	184
28	Singapore	Tan Wearn Haw; Koh Seng Leong	24	26	22	23	13	21	DNF (-30)	25	12	26	-28	250	192
29	Hungary	Marcell Goszleth; Ádám Szörényi	OCS (-30)	20	19	18	25	24	26	17	-29	28	27	263	204

== Notes ==
Points are assigned based on the finishing position in each race (1 for first, 2 for second, etc.). The points are totalled from the top 10 results of the 11 races, with lower totals being better. If a sailor was disqualified or did not complete the race, 26 points are assigned for that race (as there were 25 sailors in this competition).

Scoring abbreviations are defined as follows:

- OCS – On course side of the starting line
- DSQ – Disqualified
- DNF – Did Not Finish
- DNS – Did Not Start
- RDG – Redress Given

== Sources ==
Results and weather take from https://web.archive.org/web/20050825083600/http://www.sailing.org/olympics2000/info2000/
