= Gal Zukerman =

Israeli kite foiler (born 2003)

Gal Zukerman גל צוקרמן
- Born: 17 August 2003 (age 23); Sdot Yam, Israel
- Known for: Olympic kite foiling

Gal Zukerman (Hebrew: גל צוקרמן; born 17 August 2003) is an Israeli kite foiler. She won the Youth Sailing World Championships in 2022. Zukerman competed for Israel at the 2024 Paris Olympics in the Women's Formula Kite in Marseille, France, and came in eighth.

== Career ==
Zukerman was born in Kibbutz Sdot Yam, Israel, and grew up near Haifa. Both of her parents were Olympians. Her father Eli Zuckerman, who competed for Israel in the 2000 Sydney Olympics and came in 13th in the Men's Two Person Dinghy in a model 470 sailboat with Eldad Ronen, is the professional director of the Israel Sailing Association, but does not get involved with his daughter's model. Her mother is Shani Kedmi, who represented Israel at both the 1996 Atlanta Olympics (coming in 12th) and the 2000 Sydney Olympics (coming in 4th) in Women's Two Person Dinghy with Anat Fabrikant.

She began sailing at the age of five, and it was not until she was on holiday in Greece that Zukerman first got to try sailing with a kite. She had wanted to do this before, but her mother was concerned for her safety. The kite became important and back in Israel she took advantage of the COVID-19 pandemic in Israel to practice her new sport.

People advised Zukerman to try a hydrofoil, and eventually she joined a course in which she fell in love with being able to silently move through the water powered by a kite. Kite foiling was selected in 2019 as a new sport for the 2024 Summer Olympics in Paris.

In 2021 Zukerman competed at the Youth Sailing World Championships at Mussanah in Oman, and won. She beat the Polish kitefoiler Julia Damasiewicz. Zukerman said that because of political differences with Israel, none of the finalist's national anthems were played. Everyone was friendly towards her, but news of her victory was not published for a few days.

In June 2022 the Dutch kitefoiler Annelous Lammerts won the Hempel World Cup Allianz Regatta at Lelystad in light winds, beating the Spaniard Gisela Pulido who took silver. Zukerman sparred with her fellow Israeli Maya Ashkenazi for the bronze position, and was successful.

=== 2024 Paris Olympics ===
She was one of nearly 90 athletes who were chosen to compete for Israel at the 2024 Paris Olympics.

Zukerman competed for Israel at the 2024 Paris Olympics in the Women's Formula Kite in Marseille, France, and came in eighth.
