= Jamaica at the 2000 Summer Olympics =

- IOC code: JAM
- NOC: Jamaica Olympic Association
- Website: www.joa.org.jm

in Sydney
- Competitors: 48 (22 men and 26 women) in 4 sports
- Flag bearer: Deon Hemmings
- Medals Ranked 54th: Gold 0 Silver 6 Bronze 3 Total 9

Summer Olympics appearances (overview)
- 1948; 1952; 1956; 1960; 1964; 1968; 1972; 1976; 1980; 1984; 1988; 1992; 1996; 2000; 2004; 2008; 2012; 2016; 2020; 2024

Other related appearances
- British West Indies (1960 S)

Jamaica competed at the 2000 Summer Olympics in Sydney, Australia.

== Medalists ==
Medal	Name	Sport	Event	Date
Silver	Tayna Lawrence	Athletics	Women's 100 metres	23 September
Silver	Lorraine Graham	Athletics	Women's 400 metres	25 September
Silver	Deon Hemmings	Athletics	Women's 400 metres hurdles	27 September
Silver	Merlene Frazer; Tayna Lawrence; Veronica Campbell-Brown; Beverly McDonald; Merlene Ottey	Athletics	Women's 4 × 100 metres relay	30 September
Silver	Sandie Richards; Catherine Scott; Deon Hemmings; Lorraine Graham; Charmaine Howell; Michelle Burgher	Athletics	Women's 4 × 400 metres relay	30 September
Silver	Michael Blackwood; Greg Haughton; Christopher Williams; Danny McFarlane; Sanjay Ayre; Michael McDonald	Athletics	Men's 4 × 400 metres relay	30 September
Bronze	Merlene Ottey	Athletics	Women's 100 metres	23 September
Bronze	Greg Haughton	Athletics	Men's 400 metres	25 September
Bronze	Beverly McDonald	Athletics	Women's 200 metres	28 September

== Competitors ==
The following is the list of number of competitors in the Games.

Sport	Men	Women	Total
Athletics	20	23	43
Sailing	2	0	2
Swimming	0	2	2
Triathlon	0	1	1
Total	22	26	48

== Athletics ==
Key

- Note–Ranks given for track events are within the athlete's heat only
- Q = Qualified for the next round by position in race or, in field events, by achieving the automatic qualification target
- q = Qualified for the next round as a fastest loser or, in field events, by position without achieving the qualifying target

Men
Track and road events

Athlete	Event	Heat		Quarterfinal		Semifinal		Final	
Athlete	Event	Time	Rank	Time	Rank	Time	Rank	Time	Rank
Christopher Williams	100 m	10.35	1 Q	10.30	4	Did not advance			
Patrick Jarrett	100 m	10.41	3 Q	16.4	8	Did not advance			
Lindel Frater	100 m	10.45	3 Q	10.23	4 q	10.46	8	Did not advance	
Christopher Williams	200 m	20.45	1 Q	20.25	2 Q	20.47	5	Did not advance	
Dwight Thomas	200 m	20.85	2 Q	20.58	5	Did not advance			
Ricardo Williams	200 m	21.09	5	Did not advance					
Danny McFarlane	400 m	45.84	2 Q	45.40	4 Q	44.93	2 Q	44.70	7
Gregory Haughton	400 m	45.63	1 Q	45.08	2 Q	44.93	3 Q	44.70	3rd place, bronze medalist(s)
Davian Clarke	400 m	45.30	2 Q	45.06	1 Q	Did not finish		Did not advance	
Marvin Watts	800 m	1:59.97	8 qR	—		1:47.6	8	Did not advance	
Robert Foster	110 m hurdles	14.33	7	Did not advance					
Dinsdale Morgan	400 m hurdles	49.64	2 Q	—		50.23	7	Did not advance	
Kemel Thompson	400 m hurdles	50.40	4	—		Did not advance			
Ian Weakley	400 m hurdles	52.18	8	—		Did not advance			
Llewelyn Bredwood; Lindel Frater; Donovan Powell*; Dwight Thomas; Christopher Williams	4 × 100 m relay	38.97	4 Q	—		38.27	2 Q	38.20	4
Sanjay Ayre; Michael Blackwood; Gregory Haughton; Michael McDonald*; Danny McFarlane; Christopher Williams*	4 × 400 m relay	3:03.85	1 Q	—		2:58.84	2 Q	2:58.78	2nd place, silver medalist(s)

Field events

Athlete	Event	Qualification		Final	
Athlete	Event	Result	Rank	Result	Rank
James Beckford	Long jump	7.98	14	Did not advance	

Combined events – Decathlon

Athlete	Event	100 m	LJ	SP	HJ	400 m	110H	DT	PV	JT	1500 m	Final	Rank
Claston Bernard	Result	10.79	NM	13.68	2.09	49.77	15.01	41.15	NM	Did not finish			
Claston Bernard	Points	908	0	709	887	825	848	688	0	Did not finish			

Women
Track and road events

Athlete	Event	Heat		Quarterfinal		Semifinal		Final	
Athlete	Event	Time	Rank	Time	Rank	Time	Rank	Time	Rank
Tanya Lawrence	100 m	11.14	2 Q	11.11	3 Q	11.12	3 Q	11.18	2nd place, silver medalist(s)
Merlene Ottey	100 m	11.24	1 Q	11.08	1 Q	11.22	1 Q	11.19	3rd place, bronze medalist(s)
Beverly McDonald	100 m	11.36	2 Q	11.26	4 Q	11.31	6	Did not advance	
Beverly McDonald	200 m	22.50	1 Q	22.44	1 Q	22.70	3 Q	22.35	3rd place, bronze medalist(s)
Juliet Campbell	200 m	23.18	4 Q	23.34	7	Did not advance			
Astia Walker	200 m	23.33	4 Q	DNF		Did not advance			
Lorraine Graham	400 m	51.65	3 Q	50.66	1 Q	50.28	1 Q	49.58	2nd place, silver medalist(s)
Sandie Richards	400 m	51.86	2 Q	51.00	4 Q	50.41	5	Did not advance	
Charmaine Howell	800 m	2:01.14	5 q	—		2:00.63	7	Did not advance	
Mardrea Hyman	1500 m	4:10.21	10 q	—		4:14.20	11	Did not advance	
Delloreen Ennis-London	100 m hurdles	12.88	1 Q	12.80	4 Q	12.90	4 Q	12.89	4
Brigitte Foster	100 m hurdles	12.75	2 Q	12.88	3 Q	12.70	3 Q	13.49	8
Michelle Freeman	100 m hurdles	12.99	3 Q	13.52	7	Did not advance			
Deon Hemmings	400 m hurdles	55.44	1 Q	—		54.00	1 Q	53.45	2nd place, silver medalist(s)
Catherine Scott-Pomales	400 m hurdles	56.17	5 q	—		55.78	8	Did not advance	
Patrina Allen	400 m hurdles	59.36	7	—		Did not advance			
Veronica Campbell; Merlene Frazer; Tayna Lawrence; Beverly McDonald; Merlene Ottey	4 × 100 m relay	42.46	1 Q	—		42.15	1 Q	42.13	2nd place, silver medalist(s)
Michelle Burgher; Lorraine Graham; Deon Hemmings; Charmaine Howell; Sandie Richards; Catherine Scott-Pomales	4 × 400 m relay	3:25.65	2 Q	—				3:23.25	2nd place, silver medalist(s)

Field events

Athlete	Event	Qualification		Final	
Athlete	Event	Result	Rank	Result	Rank
Elva Goulbourne	Long jump	6.68	5 Q	6.43	10
Lacena Golding	Long jump	6.39	22	Did not advance	
Keisha Spencer	Triple jump	13.49	23	Did not advance	
Karen Beautle	High jump	NM		Did not advance	
Olivia McKoy	Javelin throw	56.36	21	Did not advance	

== Sailing ==
Athlete	Event	Race											Net points	Rank
Athlete	Event	1	2	3	4	5	6	7	8	9	10	11	Net points	Rank
Andrew Gooding; Sean Nunes	Men's 470	22	25	14	15	9	~~27~~	21	~~27~~	18	14	26	164	25

== Swimming ==
Women

Athlete	Event	Heat		Semifinal		Final	
Athlete	Event	Time	Rank	Time	Rank	Time	Rank
Angelia Chuck	50 m freestyle	27.48	49	Did not advance			
Janelle Atkinson	400 m freestyle	4:09.61	3 Q	—		04:08.79	4
Janelle Atkinson	800 m freestyle	8:34.51	9	—		Did not advance	

Qualifiers for the latter rounds (Q) of all events were decided on a time only basis, therefore positions shown are overall results versus competitors in all heats.
* – Indicates athlete swam in the preliminaries but not in the final race.

== Triathlon ==
Athlete	Event	Swim	Cycle	Run	Total	Rank
Iona Wynter	Women's	20:53.58	1:08:43.00	40:48.11	2:10:24.69	34

== See also ==
- Jamaica at the 1999 Pan American Games
