= André Fonseca =

Brazilian sailor (born 1978)

Personal information
- Full name: André Otto da Fonseca
- Nickname: Bochecha
- Born: 8 August 1978 (age 47) Florianópolis, Brazil
- Height: 1.74 m (5 ft 8 1/2 in)
- Weight: 78 kg (172 lb)

Sailing career
- Sport: Sailing
- Club: Iate Clube de Santa Catarina
- Class(es): Dinghy, skiff

André Otto da Fonseca (born 8 August 1978) is a Brazilian sailor, who specialized in the double-dinghy (470) and skiff (49er) classes. A three-time Olympian (2000, 2004, and 2008), he started his career as a double-handed dinghy sailor in Sydney, before switching to the skiff for the remaining two editions of the Games, finishing in sixth and seventh place, respectively. A Florianópolis native, Fonseca trained most of his competitive sporting career at Santa Catarina Yacht Club (Portuguese: Iate Clube de Santa Catarina).

Fonseca made his Olympic debut in Sydney 2000. There, he and his partner Alexandre Paradeda finished twenty-sixth in the men's 470 class with a net grade of 171, sparing them from the sterns of the fleet by a 33-point edge over the Hungarian duo of Marcell Goszleth and Ádám Szörényi. Fonseca switched to the skiff boat with his new partner Rodrigo Duarte and eventually surprised the 19-crew fleet with a spectacular sixth overall position in the 49er at his second Olympiad in Athens 2004, amassing 104 net points.

At the 2008 Summer Olympics in Beijing, Fonseca competed for his third Brazilian squad and second with Duarte in the 49er class. The Brazilian pair finished eleventh in the golden fleet to secure one of the five remaining spots vying for qualification at the 49er Worlds eight months earlier in Sydney, Australia. Fonseca and Duarte entered the medal race with a terrific tenth-leg triumph and a random wave of top-five marks recorded throughout the race series. Under gusty conditions and heavy rainfall, however, the Brazilians struggled to chase the rest of the fleet on the final run and never looked back, fading steadily to seventh overall with 99 net points.
