= Manuel Villareal =

Manuel Villareal can refer to:

- Manuel Villareal (Filipino sailor)
- Manuel Villareal (Mexican sailor)
