= Protasevich =

Protasevich or Pratasevich (Belarusian: Пратасевіч) is a gender-neutral Belarusian surname that may refer to the following notable people:

- Mikhail Protasevich (born 1971), Belarusian sailor
- Roman Protasevich (born 1995), Belarusian journalist and opposition activist
- Alexander (Alex) Protasevich (born 1961), Belarusian born American architect

== See also ==
- Protas
- Mark Protosevich (born 1961), American screenwriter
