= Israel at the 2019 Summer Universiade =

Israel's competition at the 2019 Summer Universiade

- IOC code: ISR
- Competitors: 25 in 5 sports
- Medals: Gold 0 Silver 0 Bronze 1 Total 1

Summer Universiade appearances (overview)
- 1997; 1999; 2001; 2003; 2005; 2007; 2009; 2011; 2013; 2015; 2017; 2019; 2021; 2025; 2027

Israel competed at the 2019 Summer Universiade also known as the 30th Summer Universiade, in Naples, Italy.

== Athletics ==
Men
Track & road events

Athlete	Event	Heat		Semifinal		Final	
Athlete	Event	Result	Rank	Result	Rank	Result	Rank
Imri Persiado	200 m	21.65	29 Q	21.40	16	Did not advance	

Field events

Athlete	Event	Qualification		Final	
Athlete	Event	Distance	Position	Distance	Position
Yorai Shaoul	Triple Jump	14.79	23	Did not advance	

Key

- Q = Qualified for the next round
- q = Qualified for the next round as a fastest loser or, in field events, by position without achieving the qualifying target
- SB = Season Best
- NM = No Mark
- DNS = Did No Start

== Basketball ==
=== Men's tournament ===
Roster

Israel men's national basketball team roster
Players
Coaches

Pos.	No.	Name	Age – Date of birth	Height	Club	Ctr.
F/C	3	Roman Sorkin	22 – 11 August 1996	2.08 m (6 ft 10 in)	Maccabi Haifa	(Israel)
G	5	Michael Brisker	21 – 21 February 1998	1.85 m (6 ft 1 in)	Maccabi Ra'anana	(Israel)
PG	6	Gil Beni	20 – 27 October 1998	1.80 m (5 ft 11 in)	Maccabi Ra'anana	(Israel)
G	7	Golan Gutt	24 – 11 July 1994	1.92 m (6 ft 4 in)	Ironi Nes Ziona	(Israel)
G	9	Orr Leumi	22 – 25 October 1996	1.92 m (6 ft 4 in)	Bnei Herzliya	(Israel)
F	12	Rafi Menco (C)	25 – 5 March 1994	2.01 m (6 ft 7 in)	Hapoel Eilat	(Israel)
G	13	Roi Huber	22 – 10 February 1997	1.88 m (6 ft 2 in)	Hapoel Holon	(Israel)
C	20	Idan Zalmanson	24 – 18 April 1995	2.06 m (6 ft 9 in)	Hapoel Eilat	(Israel)
F	21	Netanel Artzi	22 – 21 March 1997	1.98 m (6 ft 6 in)	Hapoel Gilboa Galil	(Israel)
C	23	Daniel Koperberg	21 – 8 December 1997	2.08 m (6 ft 10 in)	Maccabi Haifa	(Israel)
F	24	Lior Carreira	21 – 14 August 1997	1.98 m (6 ft 6 in)	Hapoel Galil Elyon	(Israel)
PG	99	Yiftach Ziv	23 – 9 July 1995	1.91 m (6 ft 3 in)	Ironi Nahariya	(Israel)

Head Coach

- (Israel) Oded Kattash

Legend

- Club – describes last
  club on 4 July 2019
- Age – describes age
  on 4 July 2019

Source: Universiade2019Napoli.it

==== Preliminary round ====
Qualified for the Final eight
Qualified for the Placement 9th-16th

Team	Pld	W	L	PF	PA	PD	Pts
Israel	3	3	0	237	193	+44	6
Australia	3	2	1	257	213	+44	5
Czech Republic	3	1	2	186	212	−26	4
Mexico	3	0	3	193	255	−62	3

4 July 2019
17:30 UTC+2

Report

Israel	92–64	Australia
Scoring by quarter: 22–15, 17–14, 25–18, 28–17
Pts: Gutt 17; Rebs: Zalmanson 6 Asts: Gutt 3		Pts: Vasiljevic 14; Rebs: White 6 Asts: None

PalaJacazzi
Referees: Alexey Davydov (RUS), Grant Todey (USA), Gatis Salins (LAT)

5 July 2019
20:00 UTC+2

Report

Czech Republic	54–68	Israel
Scoring by quarter: 15–6, 11–19, 17–27, 11–16
Pts: Herman 14; Rebs: Drgaoun 7 Asts: Pulpan 4		Pts: Menco 15; Rebs: Gutt 11; Asts: Artzi & Carreira 4

PalaCercola
Referees: Paulo Marques (POR), Trevor Brass (CAN) Vladyslav Isachenko (UKR)

6 July 2019
17:30 UTC+2

Report

Israel	77–75	Mexico
Scoring by quarter: 24–26, 20–11, 13–18, 20–20
Pts: Artzi 13; Rebs: Sorkin 6 Asts: Koperberg 6		Pts: Quintana 19; Rebs: Yamada 11; Asts: Lorenza 4

Palasport Del Mauro
Referees: Stanislav Valeev (RUS), Sergii Tyslenko (UKR), Alexandra Stan (ROU)

==== Quarterfinals ====
8 July 2019
17:30 UTC+2

Report

Israel	96–57	Latvia
Scoring by quarter: 24–11, 24–7, 24–14, 24–25
Pts: Artzi 18; Rebs: Artzi 5 Asts: Menco 4		Pts: Cavars 18; Rebs: Cavars 5 Asts: Januzems 6

PalaCercola
Referees: Alexey Davydov (RUS), X Zhang (CHN), Peter Arpad Praksch (HUN)

==== Semifinals ====
9 July 2019
17:30 UTC+2

Report

Israel	73–75	United States
Scoring by quarter: 26–12, 15–29, 12–10, 20–24
Pts: Artzi 19; Rebs: Menco & Gutt 6 Asts: Huber & Beni 3		Pts: Simms 27; Rebs: Simms 16; Asts: Simms & Newman III 3

Palasport Del Mauro
Referees: Paulo Marques (POR), Gatis Salins (LAT), Martin Vulic (CRO)

==== Bronze medal game ====
11 July 2019
17:30 UTC+2

Report

Israel	69–86	Australia (bronze)
Scoring by quarter: 9–24, 16–23, 23–15, 21–24
Pts: Menco & Carreira 16; Rebs: Menco 7 Asts: Zalmanson & Brisker 3		Pts: Vasiljevic 33; Rebs: J. White 9 Asts: Zunic 4

Palasport Del Mauro
Referees: Grant Todey (USA), Stanislav Valeev (RUS), Valerio Grigioni (ITA)

== Fencing ==
Men

Athlete	Event	Pool standings	Round of 64	Round of 32	Round of 16	Quarterfinal	Semifinal	Final	
Athlete	Event	Pool standings	Opposition Score	Opposition Score	Opposition Score	Opposition Score	Opposition Score	Opposition Score	Rank
Daniel Fridman	Épée	35 Q	Van Nunen (NED); L 10–15	Did not advance					
Stanislav Galper	Épée	71	Did not advance						

Women

Athlete	Event	Pool standings	Round of 64	Round of 32	Round of 16	Quarterfinal	Semifinal	Final	
Athlete	Event	Pool standings	Opposition Score	Opposition Score	Opposition Score	Opposition Score	Opposition Score	Opposition Score	Rank
Nickol Tal	Épée	41 Q	Tejeda (MEX); W 15–6	Zagala (POL); W 15–13	Salminen (FIN); W 15–13	Mroszczak (POL); W 15–9	Louis Marie (FRA); L 8–15	Did not advance	(bronze)
Nikol Gavrielko	Épée	53 Q	Stahlberg (GER); W 15–9	Louis Marie (FRA); L 8–15	Did not advance				

== Judo ==
Men

Athlete	Event	Round of 64	Round of 32	Round of 16	Quarterfinals	Semifinals	Repechage				Final/BM	
Athlete	Event	Round of 64	Round of 32	Round of 16	Quarterfinals	Semifinals	Round 1	Round 2	Quarterfinals	Semifinals	Final/BM	
Athlete	Event	Opposition Result	Opposition Result	Opposition Result	Opposition Result	Opposition Result	Opposition Result	Opposition Result	Opposition Result	Opposition Result	Opposition Result	Rank
Idan Vardi	−81 kg	Chilaro (FRA); L 00s1–10s1	Did not advance									35

== Swimming ==
Men

Athlete	Event	Heat		Semifinal		Final	
Athlete	Event	Time	Rank	Time	Rank	Time	Rank
Itay Goldfaden	50 m Breaststroke	DNS		Did not advance			
Itay Goldfaden	100 m Breaststroke	DNS		Did not advance			
Guy Gropper	50 m Freestyle	23.50	32	Did not advance			
Guy Gropper	100 m Freestyle	51.23	35	Did not advance			
Guy Gropper	50 m Butterfly	24.94	32	Did not advance			
Guy Gropper	100 m Butterfly	55.43	34	Did not advance			
Gil Kiesler	200 m Freestyle	1:51.57	27	Did not advance			
Gil Kiesler	400 m Freestyle	3:54.08	14	—N/a		Did not advance	
Gil Kiesler	800 m Freestyle	8:08.96	13	—N/a		Did not advance	
Alex Lebed	200 m Breaststroke	2:20.25	39	Did not advance			
Alex Lebed	200 m Individual Medley	2:05.04	32	Did not advance			
Alex Lebed	400 m Individual Medley	DNS		—N/a		Did not advance	
Bar Soloveychik	200 m Freestyle	1:52.49	33	Did not advance			
Bar Soloveychik	400 m Freestyle	3:59.27	30	—N/a		Did not advance	
Bar Soloveychik	800 m Freestyle	8:30.27	24	—N/a		Did not advance	

Women

Athlete	Event	Heat		Semifinal		Final	
Athlete	Event	Time	Rank	Time	Rank	Time	Rank
Gali Zilberberg	200 m Freestyle	2:06.92	27	Did not advance			
Gali Zilberberg	400 m Freestyle	4:29.71	20	—N/a		Did not advance	
Gali Zilberberg	800 m Freestyle	DNS		—N/a		Did not advance	
Gali Zilberberg	1500 m Freestyle	17:14.74	10 R	—N/a		Did not advance	
Gali Zilberberg	400 m Individual Medley	5:05.21	20	—N/a		Did not advance	
