= Peter Nicholas =

Peter Nicholas may refer to:

- Peter Nicholas (businessman) (1941–2022), American businessman and co-founder of Boston Scientific
- Peter Nicholas (footballer) (born 1959), Welsh international football (soccer) player
- Peter Nicholas (sailor) (born 1963), New Zealand sailor
