= Eli Zuckerman =

Israeli sailor

Personal information
- Native name: אלי צוקרמן
- Nationality: Israel
- Born: February 8, 1973 (age 53) Tel Aviv, Israel
- Height: 5 ft 9.5 in (176.5 cm)
- Weight: 132 lb (60 kg)

Sailing career
- Sport: Sailing
- Classes: Men's 420 Two-Person Dinghy; Men's 470 Two-Person Dinghy

Eli Zuckerman (Hebrew: אלי צוקרמן; also "Zukerman"; born February 8, 1973) is an Israeli competitive sailor.

== Early and personal life ==
He was born in Tel Aviv, Israel, and is Jewish. When Zuckerman competed in the Olympics he was 5 ft 9.5 in (176.5 cm) tall, and weighed 132 lb (60 kg). His daughter with his wife Shani Kedmi, who represented Israel at both the 1996 Atlanta Olympics (coming in 12th) and the 2000 Sydney Olympics (coming in 4th) in Women's Two Person Dinghy with Anat Fabrikant, is Gal Zuckerman, who competed for Israel at the 2024 Paris Olympics in the Women's Formula Kite in Marseille, France, and came in eighth.

== Sailing career ==
In 1991, he came in 4th in the 420 - Open Scottish Power - International Yacht Racing Union (IYRU) Youth Sailing World Championships in Largs, Scotland.

In 1999 Zuckerman and Eldad Ronen came in 9th in the Men's / Mixed 470 World Championship, in Melbourne, Australia. They were ranked Number 9 in the world during 1999. That year, he won the bronze medal in the 470 - Men XXIV International 470 Spring Cup in Narbonne-Plage, France.

In 2000 he came in 4th in the 470 - Men Kiel Week, in Kiel, Germany. That year he won the bronze medal in the 470 - Men XXV International 470 Spring Cup in Les Sablettes, La Seyne sur Mer, France.

Zuckerman, at the age of 27, and Eldad Ronen competed for Israel at the 2000 Summer Olympics in Rushcutters Bay Marina, Rose Bay, New South Wales, Australia, in Sailing--Men's 470 Two-Person Dinghy. They came in 13th out of 29 boats.

== Coaching career ==
In 2009, Zuckerman coached Israeli sailors Yoav Levi and Dan Froyliche, who won the silver medal at the 420 Junior Europeans in Lake Balaton, Hungary. In 2012, he was the manager of the Caesarea Sailing School – Sdot Yam Sailing Club.

He is the Chairman of the Professional Committee of the Israel Sailing Association.
