= Israel at the 2017 Summer Universiade =

Israel's competition at the 2017 Summer Universiade

- IOC code: ISR

in Taipei, Taiwan
- Competitors: 40 in 8 sports
- Medals: Gold 0 Silver 0 Bronze 0 Total 0

Summer Universiade appearances (overview)
- 1997; 1999; 2001; 2003; 2005; 2007; 2009; 2011; 2013; 2015; 2017; 2019; 2021; 2025; 2027

Israel competed at the 2017 Summer Universiade also known as the XXIX Summer Universiade, in Taipei, Taiwan.

== Archery ==
Recurve

Athlete	Event	Ranking round		Round of 1/48	Round of 1/24	Round of 32	Round of 16	Quarterfinals	Semifinals	Final / BM	Rank
Athlete	Event	Score	Seed	Opposition Score	Opposition Score	Opposition Score	Opposition Score	Opposition Score	Opposition Score	Opposition Score	Rank
Guy Matzkin	Men's individual	634	38	Bye	Kazuki (JPN); L 3-7	did not advance					33

Key

- N/A = Round not applicable for the event
- Bye = Athlete not required to compete in round

== Athletics ==
Men
Track & road events

Athlete	Event	Heat		Quarterfinals		Semifinal		Final	
Athlete	Event	Result	Rank	Result	Rank	Result	Rank	Result	Rank
Imri Persiado	100 m	10.44	11 Q	10.52	14 q	DNS		did not advance	

Field events

Athlete	Event	Qualification		Final	
Athlete	Event	Distance	Position	Distance	Position
Dmitry Kroyter	High jump	2.15	1 q	2.23 SB	6
Tzur Liberman	High jump	2.15	11 q	2.15	10
Tom Yakubov	triple jump	16.07	7 q	16.19	7
Itamar Levi	shot put	17.36	13	did not advance	
Itamar Levi	discus throw	NM		did not advance	

Key

- Q = Qualified for the next round
- q = Qualified for the next round as a fastest loser or, in field events, by position without achieving the qualifying target
- SB = Season Best
- NM = No Mark
- DNS = Did No Start

== Basketball ==
=== Men's tournament ===
Roster

- Ben Altit
- Amit Gershon
- Netanel Artzi
- Egor Koulechov
- Golan Gutt
- Joaquin Szuchman
- Naor Sharon
- Orel Lev
- Daniel Koperberg
- Tomer Ginat
- Daniel Danino
- Yiftach Ziv

Preliminary Round

Qualified for the Final eight
Qualified for the 9th-16th place classification playoffs
Qualified for the 17th-24th Classification playoffs

Team	Pld	W	L	PF	PA	PD	Pts
Lithuania	5	4	1	471	331	+140	9
Israel	5	4	1	464	358	+106	9
Ukraine	5	4	1	412	364	+48	9
Australia	5	3	2	408	380	+28	8
Russia	5	1	4	383	432	−49	6
Mozambique	5	0	5	236	509	−273	5

20 August 2017
20:00 (UTC+8)

Report

Israel	70–79	Lithuania
Scoring by quarter: 8–18, 23–12, 11–18, 28–31

Hisnchu Municipal Gymnasium
Referees: P. Marques (POR), G. Kapitany (HUN), R. Eriksson (SWE)

21 August 2017
15:30 (UTC+8)

Report

Russia	80–107	Israel
Scoring by quarter: 16–25, 22–31, 25–25, 17–26

University of Taipei (Tianmu) Gymnasium
Referees: G.A. Todey (USA), R.C. Kerrison (CAN), J. Yu (TPE)

23 August 2017
15:00 (UTC+8)

Report

Australia	72–89	Israel
Scoring by quarter: 21–25, 14–20, 25–21, 12–23

University of Taipei (Tianmu) Gymnasium
Referees: O. Lucis (LAT), K.Simonov (GER), T. Suslov (EST)

24 August 2017
17:30 (UTC+8)

Report

Israel	93–49	Mozambique
Scoring by quarter: 23–15, 29–9, 17–11, 24–14

Taipei Heping Basketball Gymnasium
Referees: J. Horiuchi (JAP), V. Györgyi (NOR), K.N. Apellaniz (USA)

25 August 2017
17:30 (UTC+8)

Report

Ukraine	78–105	Israel
Scoring by quarter: 16–23, 12–26, 25–28, 25–28

Hsinchu Municipal Gymnasium
Referees: L.D. Zalazar (ARG), R.C. Kerrison (CAN), M. Proc (POL)

Quarterfinals

27 August 2017
15:00 (UTC+8)

Report

United States	111–107 (OT)	Israel
Scoring by quarter: 19–23, 26–26, 26–17, 26–31, Overtime: 14–10

Taipei Arena
Referees: P. Marques (POR), S. Beliakov (RUS), P. Hrusa (CZE)

== Fencing ==
Men

Athlete	Event	Round of 128	Round of 64	Round of 32	Round of 16	Quarterfinal	Semifinal	Final/BM	
Athlete	Event	Opposition Score	Opposition Score	Opposition Score	Opposition Score	Opposition Score	Opposition Score	Opposition Score	Rank
Yuval Shalom Freilich	Épée	Bye	Jang (KOR); L 12–15	did not advance					35
Amit Parizat	Épée	Bye	Tulen (NED); L 6–15	did not advance					54
Ariel Drizin	Épée	Bye	Biabiany (FRA); L 6–15	did not advance					42
Ido Herpe	Épée	Bye	Chen (TPE); W 15–9	Weiss (USA); W 15–11	Banyai (HUN); L 14–15	did not advance			9
Yuval Shalom Freilich; Amit Parizat; Ariel Drizin; Ido Herpe	Team épée	—N/a		Bye	Italy (ITA); L 40–45	did not advance			12
Iskander Akhmetov	Foil	—N/a	did not advance						59

Women

Athlete	Event	Round of 128	Round of 64	Round of 32	Round of 16	Quarterfinal	Semifinal	Final/BM	
Athlete	Event	Opposition Score	Opposition Score	Opposition Score	Opposition Score	Opposition Score	Opposition Score	Opposition Score	Rank
Vera Maia Devi Kanevski	Épée	Bye	Linde (SWE); L 10-15	did not advance					61

== Golf ==
Athlete	Event	Round 1	Round 2	Round 3	Total		
Athlete	Event	Score	Score	Score	Score	Par	Rank
Yair Shmuel Thsler	Men's individual	73	76	72	219	+3	=27

== Judo ==
Men

Athlete	Event	Round of 64	Round of 32	Round of 16	Quarterfinals	Semifinals	Repechage				Final/BM	
Athlete	Event	Round of 64	Round of 32	Round of 16	Quarterfinals	Semifinals	Round 1	Round 2	Quarterfinals	Semifinals	Final/BM	
Athlete	Event	Opposition Result	Opposition Result	Opposition Result	Opposition Result	Opposition Result	Opposition Result	Opposition Result	Opposition Result	Opposition Result	Opposition Result	Rank
Alon Rahima	−60 kg	—N/a	Kuwabara (BRA); W 100s1–010s1	Ali (PAK); W 100–000	Yang (TPE); L 000s3–100	Did not advance	—N/a		Wala (POL); W 100–000s2	Batgerel (MGL); L 000s1–100	Did not advance	7
Yan Vinogradov	−66 kg	Rasheed (PAK); W 120–000s3	Isoda (JPN); L 000–100	did not advance			Bye	Fuzita (BRA); L 000–100	did not advance			
Bar Raufman	−73 kg	Bye	Kang (KOR); L 000s3–100	did not advance								

Women

Athlete	Event	Round of 64	Round of 32	Round of 16	Quarterfinals	Semifinals	Repechage			Final/BM	
Athlete	Event	Round of 64	Round of 32	Round of 16	Quarterfinals	Semifinals	Round 1	Quarterfinals	Semifinals	Final/BM	
Athlete	Event	Opposition Result	Opposition Result	Opposition Result	Opposition Result	Opposition Result	Opposition Result	Opposition Result	Opposition Result	Opposition Result	Rank
Maayan Greenberg	−57 kg	—N/a	Sikic (CRO); L 010–030s2	did not advance							
Noa Snir	−63 kg	—N/a	Pereira (BRA); W 010s1–000s1	Nouchi (JPN); L 000–100	did not advance		Mardjonovic (SLO); L 000–100	did not advance			

== Swimming ==
Men

Athlete	Event	Heat		Semifinal		Final	
Athlete	Event	Time	Rank	Time	Rank	Time	Rank
Yonatan Batsha	400 m freestyle	3:57.93	22	—N/a		did not advance	
Yonatan Batsha	800 m freestyle	8:18.57	21	—N/a		did not advance	
Yonatan Batsha	200 m backstroke	2:08.56	33	did not advance			
David Gamburg	100 m freestyle	50.48	28	did not advance			
David Gamburg	200 m freestyle	DNS		did not advance			
David Gamburg	100 m backstroke	55.23	10 Q	55.43	16	did not advance	
David Gamburg	200 m backstroke	2:02.51	18	did not advance			
Itay Goldfaden	50 m breaststroke	28.54	24	did not advance			
Itay Goldfaden	100 m breaststroke	1:02.66	31	did not advance			
Jonatan Kopelev	50 m backstroke	25.17	3 Q	25.42	10	did not advance	
Jonatan Kopelev	100 m backstroke	55.85	19	did not advance			
Oren Malka	50 m freestyle	23.79	52	did not advance			
Oren Malka	50 m breaststroke	30.57	51	did not advance			
Oren Malka	50 m backstroke	26.80	42	did not advance			
Marcus Schlesinger	50 m freestyle	22.72	18	did not advance			
Marcus Schlesinger	50 m butterfly	24.05	10 Q	23.72	7 Q	23.80	7
Marcus Schlesinger	100 m butterfly	53.64	23	did not advance			
Daniel Namir	100 m freestyle	51.43	51	did not advance			
Daniel Namir	200 m freestyle	1:50.79	20	did not advance			
Daniel Namir	50 m butterfly	24.93	39	did not advance			
Daniel Namir	100 m butterfly	55.87	52	did not advance			
Jonatan Kopelev; Itay Goldfaden; Marcus Schlesinger; David Gamburg	4 × 100 m medley relay	3:41.81	15	—N/a		did not advance	
Shahar Resman	10 km marathon	—N/a				2:05:37.5	16

Women

Athlete	Event	Heat		Semifinal		Final	
Athlete	Event	Time	Rank	Time	Rank	Time	Rank
Shahar Menahem	100 m freestyle	57.75	30	did not advance			
Shahar Menahem	200 m freestyle	2:05.28	30	did not advance			
Shahar Menahem	50 m backstroke	29.48	20	did not advance			
Shahar Menahem	100 m backstroke	1:03.56	29	did not advance			
Shahar Menahem	200 m backstroke	2:17.58	20	did not advance			

== Weightlifting ==
Athlete	Event	Snatch		Clean & Jerk		Total	Rank
Athlete	Event	Result	Rank	Result	Rank	Total	Rank
David Litvinov	Men's +105 kg	161	13	195	13	356	14
