= Israel at the 2013 Summer Universiade =

Israel's competition at the 2013 Summer Universiade

- IOC code: ISR
- Competitors: 40
- Medals Ranked 28th: Gold 2 Silver 1 Bronze 1 Total 4

Summer Universiade appearances (overview)
- 1997; 1999; 2001; 2003; 2005; 2007; 2009; 2011; 2013; 2015; 2017; 2019; 2021; 2025; 2027

Israel competed at the 2013 Summer Universiade also known as the XXVII Summer Universiade, in Kazan (Tatarstan), Russia.

Israeli Andrea Murez representing the United States at the 2013 Summer Universiade was a 4 × 200 m freestyle gold medalist and a 4 × 100 m freestyle silver medalist.

== Medals ==
=== Medals by sport ===
Sport	Gold	Silver	Bronze	Total
Sambo	1	1	0	2
Belt wrestling	1	0	1	2
Totals (2 entries)	2	1	1	4

== Belt wrestling ==
=== Men's Classic Style ===
Event	Gold	Silver	Bronze
+100 kg	Sergey Pavlik; Russia	Aliaksei Sobal; Belarus	Gregory Rudelson; Israel
+100 kg	Sergey Pavlik; Russia	Aliaksei Sobal; Belarus	Sugarjargal Boldpurev; Mongolia

=== Women's freestyle ===
Event	Gold	Silver	Bronze
66 kg	Alice Schlesinger; Israel	Anna Emelyanenko; Russia	Enkhchimeg Sodnomsuren; Mongolia
66 kg	Alice Schlesinger; Israel	Anna Emelyanenko; Russia	Gulnar Hayitbayeva; Turkmenistan

== Sambo ==
=== Men's Sambo ===
Event	Gold	Silver	Bronze
100 kg	Mikalai Matsko; Belarus	Peter Paltchik; Israel	Dmitriy Eliseev; Russia
100 kg	Mikalai Matsko; Belarus	Peter Paltchik; Israel	Mykhailo Cherkasov; Ukraine

=== Women's Sambo ===
Event	Gold	Silver	Bronze
64 kg	Alice Schlesinger; Israel	Tatsiana Tokts; Belarus	Akane Ikuta; Japan
64 kg	Alice Schlesinger; Israel	Tatsiana Tokts; Belarus	Gulnar Hayytbayeva; Turkmenistan
