= Israel at the 2001 Summer Universiade =

Israel's competition at the 2001 Summer Universiade

- IOC code: ISR
- Medals Ranked 22nd: Gold 1 Silver 1 Bronze 0 Total 2

Summer Universiade appearances (overview)
- 1997; 1999; 2001; 2003; 2005; 2007; 2009; 2011; 2013; 2015; 2017; 2019; 2021; 2025; 2027

Israel competed at the 2001 Summer Universiade also known as the XX Summer Universiade, in Palma de Mallorca, Spain.

== Medals ==
=== Medals by sport ===
Sport	Gold	Silver	Bronze	Total
Athletics	1	1	0	2
Totals (1 entries)	1	1	0	2

== Athletics ==
=== Men's ===
Event	Gold		Silver		Bronze	
Half marathon	Masakazu Fujiwara (JPN)	1:04:12	Wodage Zvadya (ISR)	1:04:30	Ryoji Matsushita (JPN)	1:04:53
Pole vault	Aleksandr Averbukh (ISR)	5.80	Štěpán Janáček (CZE)	5.70	Laurens Looije (NED)	5.60
