= Igor Ivashintsov =

Belarusian sailor

Personal information
- Nationality: Belarusian
- Born: 30 January 1972 (age 53); Minsk, Belarus

Sport
- Sport: Sailing

Igor Ivashintsov (born 30 January 1972) is a Belarusian sailor. He competed in the men's 470 event at the 2000 Summer Olympics.
