= Protas =

Protas is a surname. Notable people with the surname include:

- Aliaksei Protas (born 2001), Belarusian ice hockey player
- Ron Protas (fl. 1960s), American dance company director

== See also ==
- Protasevich
