= Yuji Miyai =

Japanese sailor

Personal information
- Nationality: Japanese
- Born: 4 January 1978 (age 47) Tokyo, Japan

Sport
- Sport: Sailing

Yuji Miyai (born 4 January 1978) is a Japanese sailor. He competed in the men's 470 event at the 2000 Summer Olympics.
