= Israel at the 2003 Summer Universiade =

Israel's competition at the 2003 Summer Universiade

- IOC code: ISR
- Medals Ranked 44th: Gold 0 Silver 0 Bronze 2 Total 2

Summer Universiade appearances (overview)
- 1997; 1999; 2001; 2003; 2005; 2007; 2009; 2011; 2013; 2015; 2017; 2019; 2021; 2025; 2027

Israel competed at the 2003 Summer Universiade also known as the XXI Summer Universiade, in Daegu, South Korea.

== Medals ==
=== Medals by sport ===
Sport	Gold	Silver	Bronze	Total
Swimming	0	0	1	1
Taekwondo	0	0	1	1
Totals (2 entries)	0	0	2	2

== Swimming ==
=== Men's ===
Event	Gold		Silver		Bronze	
400 m individual medley	Takahiro Mori (JPN)	4:17.23	Eric Shanteau (USA)	4:19.82	Michael Halika (ISR)	4:20.52

== Taekwondo ==
=== Men's ===
Event	Gold	Silver	Bronze
72 kg	Carlo Molfetta (ITA)	Petro Davydov (UKR)	Chen Shihkai (TPE); Nir David Moriah (ISR)
