= Israel at the 1997 Summer Universiade =

Israel's competition at the 1997 Summer Universiade

- IOC code: ISR
- Medals Ranked 30th: Gold 0 Silver 1 Bronze 0 Total 1

Summer Universiade appearances (overview)
- 1997; 1999; 2001; 2003; 2005; 2007; 2009; 2011; 2013; 2015; 2017; 2019; 2021; 2025; 2027

Israel competed at the 1997 Summer Universiade, also known as the XIX Summer Universiade, in Sicily, Italy.

== Medals ==
=== Medals by sport ===
Sport	Gold	Silver	Bronze	Total
Swimming	0	1	0	1
Totals (1 entries)	0	1	0	1

== Swimming ==
=== Men's ===
Event	Gold		Silver		Bronze	
400 m individual medley	Tatsuya Kinugasa (JPN)	4:24.18	Michael Halika (ISR)	4:24.96	Stefano Battistelli (ITA)	4:25.66
