= Israel at the 2009 Winter Universiade =

Israel's competition at the 2009 Winter Universiade

- IOC code: ISR
- Medals Ranked 15th: Gold 1 Silver 0 Bronze 0 Total 1

Winter Universiade appearances (overview)
- 2009

Israel competed at the 2009 Winter Universiade also known as the XXIV Winter Universiade, in Harbin, China.

== Medals ==
=== Medals by sport ===
Sport	Gold	Silver	Bronze	Total
Figure skating	1	0	0	1
Totals (1 entries)	1	0	0	1

== Figure skating ==
=== Ice dancing ===
Rank	Name	Nation	Total points	CD		OD		FD	
1	Alexandra Zaretski / Roman Zaretski	Israel	177.43	1	34.77	1	53.67	1	88.99
