= Mark Turnbull =

Australian sailor

Medal record

Sailing

Representing Australia

Olympic Games
Gold medal – first place	2000 Sydney	470 class

Mark David Turnbull OAM (born 11 October 1973) is an Australian sailor and Olympic champion. He won a gold medal in the 470 Class with Tom King at the 2000 Summer Olympics in Sydney. He and King were inducted into the Australian Sailing Hall of Fame in 2022.

Turnbull was educated at St. Leonard's College in Brighton East, Victoria, Australia.
