= Israel at the 2007 Summer Universiade =

Israel's competition at the 2007 Summer Universiade

- IOC code: ISR
- Medals Ranked 54th: Gold 0 Silver 1 Bronze 0 Total 1

Summer Universiade appearances (overview)
- 1997; 1999; 2001; 2003; 2005; 2007; 2009; 2011; 2013; 2015; 2017; 2019; 2021; 2025; 2027

Israel competed at the 2007 Summer Universiade also known as the XXIV Summer Universiade, in Bangkok, Thailand. It won 1 silver medal.

== Medals ==
=== Medals by sport ===
Sport	Gold	Silver	Bronze	Total
Fencing	0	1	0	1
Totals (1 entries)	0	1	0	1

== Basketball ==
=== Men's competition ===
Preliminary round (group stage)

Qualified for the quarterfinals group I-IV
Qualified for the quarterfinals group V-VI

Team	Pts.	W	L	PCT
Israel	4	2	0	1.000
South Korea	3	1	1	5.000
Australia	2	0	2	0.000

Second Phase (Classification)

Qualified for the championship contention
Classification 9-16

Team	Pts.	W	L	PCT	Tiebreak	
Team	Pts.	W	L	PCT	GF	GA
Canada	5	2	1	0.667	236	198
South Korea	5	2	1	0.667	232	214
Israel	5	2	1	0.667	222	242
New Zealand	3	0	3	0.000		

== Fencing ==
=== Women's ===
Event	Gold	Silver	Bronze
Individual Épée	Yana Shemyakina (UKR)	Noam Mills (ISR)	Tan Li (CHN)
Individual Épée	Yana Shemyakina (UKR)	Noam Mills (ISR)	Malgorzata Bereza (POL)
