= Swimming at the 2017 Summer Universiade – Men's 200 metre backstroke =

Men's 200 metre backstroke at the 2017 Summer Universiade
- Venue: National Taiwan Sport University Arena
- Location: Taipei, Taiwan
- Dates: 24 August (heats and semifinals); 25 August (final)
- Competitors: 39 from 27 nations
- Winning time: 1:56.52

Medalists
gold medal	Danas Rapšys	Lithuania
silver medal	Austin Katz	United States
bronze medal	Roman Larin	Russia

The Men's 200 metre backstroke competition at the 2017 Summer Universiade was held on 24 and 25 August 2017.

== Records ==
Prior to the competition, the existing world and Universiade records were as follows.

World record	Aaron Peirsol (USA)	1:51.92	Rome, Italy	31 July 2009
Competition record	Ryosuke Irie (JPN)	1:54.13	Belgrade, Serbia	10 July 2009

== Results ==
=== Heats ===
The heats were held on 24 August at 9:00.

Rank	Heat	Lane	Name	Nationality	Time	Notes
1	5	4	Kosuke Hagino	Japan	1:58.83	Q
2	5	5	Robert Owen	United States	1:58.96	Q
3	4	5	Austin Katz	United States	1:59.64	Q
4	4	6	Martin Binedell	South Africa	1:59.98	Q
5	3	4	Danas Rapšys	Lithuania	2:00.25	Q
6	3	6	Mikita Tsmyh	Belarus	2:00.46	Q
7	3	2	Lee Ju-ho	South Korea	2:00.50	Q
8	4	2	Robert Hill	Canada	2:00.78	Q
8	5	6	Roman Larin	Russia	2:00.78	Q
10	4	7	Markus Thormeyer	Canada	2:00.98	Q
11	4	4	Matteo Restivo	Italy	2:01.12	Q
12	3	3	Gábor Balog	Hungary	2:01.17	Q
13	4	3	Christopher Ciccarese	Italy	2:01.37	Q
14	5	7	Dag Fredriksson	Sweden	2:01.42	Q
15	5	1	Shuhei Uno	Japan	2:01.55	Q
16	3	5	Andrey Shabasov	Russia	2:02.19	Q
17	5	3	Leonardo de Deus	Brazil	2:02.20	
18	5	2	David Gamburg	Israel	2:02.51	
19	3	1	Andy Song	Mexico	2:03.08	
20	3	8	Gytis Stankevičius	Lithuania	2:04.10	
21	4	8	Corneille Coetzee	New Zealand	2:04.26	
22	4	1	Neil Fair	South Africa	2:04.39	
23	2	4	Gabriel Lópes	Portugal	2:04.52	
24	2	6	Girts Feldbergs	Latvia	2:04.99	
25	2	2	Bayley Main	New Zealand	2:05.16	
26	5	8	David Céspedes	Colombia	2:05.82	
27	1	4	Arjan Knipping	Netherlands	2:06.08	
28	2	1	Rory McEvoy	Ireland	2:06.23	
29	2	5	Adil Kaskabay	Kazakhstan	2:06.38	
30	3	7	Axel Pettersson	Sweden	2:06.61	
31	2	8	Adityastha Rai Wratsangka	Indonesia	2:07.50	
32	2	7	Thomas Liess	Switzerland	2:07.57	
33	2	3	Yonatan Batsha	Israel	2:08.56	
34	1	3	Lau Shiu Yue	Hong Kong	2:09.42	
35	1	5	David Prendergast	Ireland	2:09.81	
36	1	2	Andrei Gussev	Estonia	2:12.28	
37	1	7	Arian Neil Puyo	Philippines	2:19.59	
38	1	6	Alfredo Yaluk	Paraguay	2:21.57	
39	1	1	Gian Berino	Philippines	2:30.38	
	1	8	Abdulrahman Al-Hashmi	Oman	DNS	

=== Semifinals ===
The semifinals were held on 24 August at 19:57.

==== Semifinal 1 ====
Rank	Lane	Name	Nationality	Time	Notes
1	4	Robert Owen	United States	1:58.32	Q
2	5	Martin Binedell	South Africa	1:58.37	Q
3	8	Andrey Shabasov	Russia	1:59.40	Q
4	6	Roman Larin	Russia	1:59.84	Q
5	7	Gábor Balog	Hungary	2:00.35	
6	2	Markus Thormeyer	Canada	2:00.88	
7	3	Mikita Tsmyh	Belarus	2:02.22	
8	1	Dag Fredriksson	Sweden	2:02.57	

==== Semifinal 2 ====
Rank	Lane	Name	Nationality	Time	Notes
1	3	Danas Rapšys	Lithuania	1:57.47	Q
2	5	Austin Katz	United States	1:57.69	Q
3	4	Kosuke Hagino	Japan	1:58.28	Q
4	1	Christopher Ciccarese	Italy	2:00.06	Q
5	6	Lee Ju-ho	South Korea	2:00.84	
6	7	Matteo Restivo	Italy	2:01.06	
7	2	Robert Hill	Canada	2:01.22	
8	8	Shuhei Uno	Japan	2:03.96	

=== Final ===
The final was held on 25 August at 20:10.

Rank	Lane	Name	Nationality	Time	Notes
1st place, gold medalist(s)	4	Danas Rapšys	Lithuania	1:56.52	
2nd place, silver medalist(s)	5	Austin Katz	United States	1:56.70	
3rd place, bronze medalist(s)	1	Roman Larin	Russia	1:57.29	
4	3	Kosuke Hagino	Japan	1:57.77	
5	7	Andrey Shabasov	Russia	1:58.16	
6	2	Martin Binedell	South Africa	1:58.17	
7	6	Robert Owen	United States	1:58.52	
8	8	Christopher Ciccarese	Italy	2:00.52	
