= Israel at the 1999 Summer Universiade =

Israel's competition at the 1999 Summer Universiade

- IOC code: ISR
- Medals Ranked 31st: Gold 0 Silver 1 Bronze 1 Total 2

Summer Universiade appearances (overview)
- 1997; 1999; 2001; 2003; 2005; 2007; 2009; 2011; 2013; 2015; 2017; 2019; 2021; 2025; 2027

Israel competed at the 1999 Summer Universiade also known as the XX Summer Universiade, in Palma de Mallorca, Spain.

== Medals ==
=== Medals by sport ===
Sport	Gold	Silver	Bronze	Total
Swimming	0	1	0	1
Sailing	0	0	1	1
Totals (2 entries)	0	1	1	2

== Sailing ==
Event	Gold	Silver	Bronze
470	Perana Via-Dufrense / Sandra Azon Canalda (ESP)	Anna Basalkina / V. Oukraintseva (RUS)	Shany Kedmy / Anat Fabrikant (ISR)

== Swimming ==
=== Men's ===
Event	Gold	Silver	Bronze
400 m individual medley	Beau Wiebel (USA)	Michael Halika (ISR)	Takahiro Mori (JPN)
