= Toni Bulaja =

Croatian sailor (born 1974)

Personal information
- Nationality: Croatian
- Born: 4 June 1974 (age 50); Split, Yugoslavia

Sport
- Sport: Sailing

Toni Bulaja (born 4 June 1974) is a Croatian sailor. He competed in the men's 470 event at the 2000 Summer Olympics.
