= Israel at the 2011 Summer Universiade =

Israel's competition at the 2011 Summer Universiade

- IOC code: ISR
- Competitors: 64
- Medals Ranked 50th: Gold 0 Silver 1 Bronze 0 Total 1

Summer Universiade appearances (overview)
- 1997; 1999; 2001; 2003; 2005; 2007; 2009; 2011; 2013; 2015; 2017; 2019; 2021; 2025; 2027

Israel competed at the 2011 Summer Universiade in Shenzhen, China. The Israeli delegation included 38 athletes, and consisted of men's basketball and men's volleyball teams, as well as 14 individual athletes in athletics, fencing and swimming. Swimmer Guy Barnea was the flag bearer in the opening ceremony, and won the only medal for Israel, a silver in men's 50 m backstroke.

== Medals ==
=== Medals by sport ===
Sport	Gold	Silver	Bronze	Total
Swimming	0	1	0	1
Totals (1 entries)	0	1	0	1

== Athletics ==
- Danielle Frenkel - women's high jump
- Rotem Golan - women's long jump
- Yevgeniy Olhovski - men's pole vault

== Basketball ==
=== Preliminary Group D ===
Team	Pld	W	L	PF	PA	PD	Pts.
United States	5	5	0	540	336	+204	10
Finland	5	3	2	358	389	−31	8
Mexico	5	3	2	399	423	−24	8
Israel	5	2	3	367	385	−18	7
South Korea	5	2	3	415	450	−35	7
Hungary	5	0	5	314	410	−96	5

August 13, 2011
18:00

Report

Israel	67–60	Hungary
Scoring by quarter: 16-20, 22-10, 16-13, 13-17
Pts: Karni 15; Rebs: Karni 10; Asts: Reis, Bet Yosef 2		Pts: Szabo 14; Rebs: Morgen 5 Asts: Helmeczi 3

Shenzhen Luohu Gymnasium, Shenzhen
Referees: Mindaugas Vecerskis (LTU)

August 14, 2011
12:30

Report

Finland	72–57	Israel
Scoring by quarter: 21–13, 14–18, 18–12, 19–14
Pts: Heinonen 15; Rebs: Heinonen 8 Asts: Niemi, Kanervo 1		Pts: Daniel 15; Rebs: Pitsnon 11; Asts: Karni 2

Gymnasium of the Senior High Division of Shenzhen Foreign Languages School, Shenzhen
Referees: Marius Udrica(ROU)

August 15, 2011
18:00

Report

Mexico	77–72	Israel
Scoring by quarter: 23-19, 13-22, 18-16, 23-15
Pts: Giron 21; Rebs: Cruz 8 Asts: Martin del Campo, Cruz, Giron 2		Pts: Shoutvin 20; Rebs: Harrush 11; Asts: Eytan, Harrush 2

Gymnasium of Pingshan Sports Center, Shenzhen
Referees: Milija Vojinovic (SRB)

August 17, 2011
18:00

Report

Israel	87–82	South Korea
Scoring by quarter: 20-18, 14-22, 23-20, 30-22
Pts: Reis 30; Rebs: Reis, Shoutvin 7 Asts: Simhon, Shulman 3		Pts: Lee JH 39; Rebs: Lee SH 11; Asts: Lee JH 5

Shenzhen Luohu Gymnasium, Shenzhen
Referees: Boris Schmidt (Germany)

August 18, 2011
15:30

Report

United States	94–84	Israel
Scoring by quarter: 27-23, 14-20, 29-19, 24-22
Pts: J Green 16; Rebs: Mbakwe 13; Asts: Johnson, D Green 2		Pts: Shoutvin 20; Rebs: Shoutvin 8 Asts: Bet Yosef 3

Main Gymnasium of Universiade Center, Shenzhen
Referees: Jurgis Lauranovicius (Lithuania)

=== Classification 9th-16th Place ===
August 20, 2011
18:00

Report

Ukraine	95–80	Israel
Scoring by quarter: 25–19, 27–21, 24–22, 19–18
Pts: Zaytsev 21; Rebs: Zaytsev 16; Asts: Burenko 8		Pts: Shoutvin 18; Rebs: Harrush 8 Asts: Eytan, Harrush 1

Gymnasium of Pingshan Sports Center, Shenzhen
Referees: Boris Schmidt (Germany)

=== Classification 13th-16th Place ===
August 21, 2011
18:00

Report

Australia	83–88 (OT)	Israel
Scoring by quarter: 19–19, 13–17, 18–21, 22–15, Overtime: 11–16
Pts: Dowdell 23; Rebs: Dowdell 10; Asts: Maynard, Broekhoff, Dowdell 3		Pts: Bet Yosef 19; Rebs: Pitsnon 17; Asts: Pitsnon, Shoutvin 3

Gymnasium of the Senior High Division of Shenzhen Foreign Languages School, Shenzhen
Referees: Rafael Ganiev (Russia)

=== 13th Place Game ===
August 22, 2011
12:30

Report

Israel	60–65	Brazil
Scoring by quarter: 15–17, 17–15, 16–9, 12–24
Pts: Reis, Karni 13; Rebs: Reis 8 Asts: Pitsnon, Shoutvin, Harrush 1		Pts: Santos, Nogueira 13; Rebs: Santos 11; Asts: Chaia 3

Main Gymnasium of Universiade Center, Shenzhen
Referees: Rafael Ganiev (Russia)

== Fencing ==
- Iris Shechtman - women's épée.
- Ido Herpe - men's épée
- Maor Hatoel - men's foil

== Swimming ==
Men

- Guy Barnea
- Itai Chammah
- Alon Mandel
- Imri Ganiel
- Nimrod Hayet

Women

- Alisa Tsypin
- Keren Siebner
- Meredith Budner

== Volleyball ==
=== Preliminary Group C ===
Pos	Team	Pld	W	L	Pts	SW	SL	SR	SPW	SPL	SPR
1	Brazil	4	4	0	8	12	2	6.000	364	263	1.384
2	South Korea	4	3	1	7	10	6	1.667	384	333	1.153
3	Israel	4	2	2	6	9	6	1.500	323	305	1.059
4	Sweden	4	1	3	5	4	9	0.444	262	295	0.888
5	Hong Kong	4	0	4	4	0	12	0.000	163	300	0.543

Date		Score		Set 1	Set 2	Set 3	Set 4	Set 5	Total
12 August	Israel	3–0	Sweden	25–15	25–18	25–19			75–52
13 August	Hong Kong	0–3	Israel	18–25	13–25	13–25			44–75
15 August	Israel	1–3	Brazil	25–22	10–25	20–25	18–25		73–97
16 August	South Korea	3–2	Israel	23–25	23–25	25–17	26–24	15–9	112–100

=== Classification 9-16 places ===
Date		Score		Set 1	Set 2	Set 3	Set 4	Set 5	Total
19 August	Israel	3–0	Norway	28–26	25–17	25–16			78–59

=== Classification 9-12 places ===
Date		Score		Set 1	Set 2	Set 3	Set 4	Set 5	Total
20 August	Israel	3–0	Iran	25–0	25–0	25–0			75–0

=== 9th place match ===
Date		Score		Set 1	Set 2	Set 3	Set 4	Set 5	Total
21 August	Japan	3–0	Israel	26–24	25–18	30–28			
