= Israel at the 2015 Summer Universiade =

Israel's competition at the 2015 Summer Universiade

- IOC code: ISR
- Competitors: 27
- Medals: Gold 0 Silver 0 Bronze 0 Total 0

Summer Universiade appearances (overview)
- 1997; 1999; 2001; 2003; 2005; 2007; 2009; 2011; 2013; 2015; 2017; 2019; 2021; 2025; 2027

Israel competed at the 2015 Summer Universiade also known as the XXVIII Summer Universiade, in Gwangju, South Korea.

== Men's handball ==
During the men's handball tournament, Israel competed and finished in 5th place.

=== Preliminary round - Group B ===
==== Standings ====
Team	Pld	W	D	L	GF	GA	GD	Pts
Portugal	5	5	0	0	159	120	39	10
Switzerland	5	3	1	1	146	131	15	7
Israel	5	2	1	2	134	143	-9	5
Brazil	5	2	0	3	147	147	0	4
Hungary	5	2	0	3	130	140	–10	4
Japan	5	0	0	5	128	163	–35	0

Team qualified to the gold medal match
Team qualified to the bronze medal match

==== Games ====
6 July; 20:00	Portugal	37–26	Israel	Naju Indoor Gymnasium, Naju
6 July; 20:00	Magalhaes 7	(19–14)	Hershkovitz 6	Naju Indoor Gymnasium, Naju
6 July; 20:00	4× (yellow card) 6× (suspension)	Report	3× (yellow card) 3× (suspension)	Naju Indoor Gymnasium, Naju

7 July; 20:00	Israel	23–27	Hungary	Gochang County Gymnasium, Gochang
7 July; 20:00	Levi, Davda 5	(11–13)	Orszagh 7	Gochang County Gymnasium, Gochang
7 July; 20:00	3× (yellow card) 5× (suspension)	Report	2× (yellow card) 8× (suspension)	Gochang County Gymnasium, Gochang

9 July; 20:00	Switzerland	27–27	Israel	Naju Indoor Gymnasium, Naju
9 July; 20:00	Raemy 6	(11–15)	Kofman 8	Naju Indoor Gymnasium, Naju
9 July; 20:00	3× (yellow card) 6× (suspension)	Report	2× (yellow card) 6× (suspension)	Naju Indoor Gymnasium, Naju

10 July; 20:00	Israel	28–25	Brazil	Gochang County Gymnasium, Gochang
10 July; 20:00	Kofman 6	(15–12)	Freitas 8	Gochang County Gymnasium, Gochang
10 July; 20:00	3× (yellow card) 2× (suspension)	Report	3× (yellow card) 5× (suspension)	Gochang County Gymnasium, Gochang

12 July; 20:00	Japan	27–30	Israel	Gurye Indoor Gymnasium, Gurye
12 July; 20:00	Utsumi 8	(15–16)	Levi 6	Gurye Indoor Gymnasium, Gurye
12 July; 20:00	3× (yellow card) 1× (suspension)	Report	5× (yellow card) 4× (suspension)	Gurye Indoor Gymnasium, Gurye

=== 5th place match ===
13 July; 12:00	Russia	33–34 (ET)	Israel	Naju Indoor Gymnasium, Naju
13 July; 12:00	Otrezov 7	(14–16)	Mazki 7	Naju Indoor Gymnasium, Naju
13 July; 12:00	3× (yellow card) 2× (suspension)	Report	3× (yellow card) 5× (suspension)	Naju Indoor Gymnasium, Naju

=== Roster ===
Head Coach: Shahar Haber

#	Player
6	Tal Gera
10	Vladislav Kofman
11	Niv Levi
12	Oren Meirovich
14	Dan Tepper
17	Omri Kushmaro
18	Daniel Andres Friedmann
21	Omer Jacob Davda
24	Amit Yehiel Stelman
27	Aleksandr Sychenko
28	Elad Kappon
41	Matan Golz
42	Tal Hershkowitz
55	Ran Eliran Mazki
77	Amit Yehuda Gal
88	Tomer Uriel Toueg
