= Santiago Hernández (sailor) =

Mexican sailor (born 1979)

Personal information
- Nationality: Mexican
- Born: 1 October 1979 (age 45)

Sport
- Sport: Sailing

Santiago Hernández (born 1 October 1979) is a Mexican sailor. He competed in the men's 470 event at the 2000 Summer Olympics.
