= Shani Kedmi =

Israeli sailor

Personal information
- Native name: שני קדמי
- Nationality: Israel
- Born: July 20, 1977 (age 49) Tel Aviv, Israel
- Height: 5 ft 2.5 in (159 cm)
- Weight: 128 lb (58 kg)

Sailing career
- Sport: Sailing
- Club: Hapoel Tel Aviv
- Class: 470
Medal record
Representing Israel
Summer Universiade
Bronze medal – third place	1999 Palma de Mallorca	470 class

Shani Kedmi (Hebrew: שני קדמי; born July 20, 1977) is an Israeli former Olympic competitive sailor.

== Early and personal life ==
She was born in Tel Aviv, Israel, and is Jewish. Her daughter with her husband Eli Zuckerman, who competed for Israel in the 2000 Sydney Olympics and came in 13th in the Men's Two Person Dinghy in a model 470 sailboat with Eldad Ronen, is Gal Zuckerman, who competed for Israel at the 2024 Paris Olympics in the Women's Formula Kite in Marseille, France, and came in eighth.

== Sailing career ==
Kedmi began competing in sailing at the age of 15. Her club was Hapoel Tel Aviv. When she participated in the Olympics she was 5 ft 2.5 in (159 cm) tall, and weighed 128 lb (58 kg).

She and Anat Fabrikant placed 8th at the 1995 European Championships in the 470 competition.

Kedmi represented Israel at the 1996 Summer Olympics in Atlanta, Georgia, at the age of 19 in Sailing—Women's Two Person Dinghy 470 event with Fabrikant, and came in 12th.

In 1999, Kedmi and Fabrikant won a silver medal at the Holland Regatta, won a bronze medal representing Israel at the 1999 Summer Universiade, placed 4th at both the European and World Championships, and were ranked No. 2 in the world. In 2000 they finished 6th at the 2000 European Championships.

Kedmi represented Israel at the 2000 Summer Olympics in Sydney, Australia, at the age of 23 in Sailing—Women's Two Person Dinghy 470 event with Fabrikant, and came in 4th, two points behind the bronze medal-winning team from Ukraine.
