= Israel at the 2009 Summer Universiade =

Israel's competition at the 2009 Summer Universiade

- IOC code: ISR
- Competitors: 32
- Medals Ranked 52nd: Gold 0 Silver 1 Bronze 1 Total 2

Summer Universiade appearances (overview)
- 1997; 1999; 2001; 2003; 2005; 2007; 2009; 2011; 2013; 2015; 2017; 2019; 2021; 2025; 2027

Israel competed at the 2009 Summer Universiade also known as the XXV Summer Universiade, in Belgrade, Serbia.

== Medals ==
=== Medals by sport ===
Sport	Gold	Silver	Bronze	Total
Gymnastics	0	1	0	1
Swimming	0	0	1	1
Totals (2 entries)	0	1	1	2

== Gymnastics ==
=== Women's rhythmic gymnastics ===
Event	Gold	Silver	Bronze
Individual Hoop	Yevgeniya Kanayeva (RUS)	Irina Risenzon (ISR)	Aliya Yussupova (KAZ)

== Swimming ==
=== Men's ===
Event	Gold		Silver		Bronze	
50m Backstroke	Junya Koga; Japan	24.63 GR	Ryosuke Irie; Japan	25.05	Guy Barnea; Israel	25.09
