= Israel at the 2021 Summer World University Games =

- Flag of Israel
- IOC code: ISR

in Chengdu, China 28 July 2023 – 8 August 2023
- Competitors: 5 (5 men)
- Medals: Gold 0 Silver 0 Bronze 0 Total 0

Summer World University Games appearances
- 1997; 1999; 2001; 2003; 2005; 2007; 2009; 2011; 2013; 2015; 2017; 2019; 2021; 2025; 2027

Israel competed at the 2021 Summer World University Games in Chengdu, China held from 28 July to 8 August 2023.

== Competitors ==
Sport	Men	Women	Total
Athletics	1	0	1
Fencing	4	0	4

== Athletics ==
Men

Athlete	Event	Qualification		Final	
Athlete	Event	Result	Rank	Result	Rank
Ishay Ifraimov	Long jump	7.42	15	Did not advance	

== Fencing ==
Athlete	Event	Group stage							Round of 128	Round of 64	Round of 32	Round of 16	Quarter-finals	Semi-finals	Final / BM	
Athlete	Event	Opponent score	Opponent score	Opponent score	Opponent score	Opponent score	Opponent score	Rank	Opponent score	Opponent score	Opponent score	Opponent score	Opponent score	Opponent score	Opponent score	Rank
Niran Czuckermann	Men's individual foil	Sampson (USA); L 4–5	Youn (KOR); L 2–5	Cheung (HKG); L 4–5	Kozak (POL); L 4–5	Chua (SGP); L 3–5	Fei (CHN); W 5–4	54	Did not advance							
Roy Gross	Men's individual foil	Xiao (USA); L 0–5	Korom (HUN); L 4–5	Filippi (ITA); L 4–5	Ng (HKG); W 5–3	Zoons (NED); L 4–5	Jurkiewicz (POL); L3–5	55	Did not advance							
Yaakov Rapoport	Men's individual foil	Choi (HKG); L 3–5	Kawamura (JPN); W 5–1	Lombardi (ITA); L 2–5	Huang (CHN); L 0–5	Nandeibam (IND); W 5–1	Seo (KOR); L 0–5	50 Q	Xiao (USA); W 15–9	Mihályi (HUN); L 14–15	Did not advance					
Roey Rosenfeld	Men's individual foil	Bibard (FRA); W 5–3	De Greef (BEL); L 1–5	Ng (MAC); W 5–1	Lock (SGP); W 5–3	Zhao (USA); L 0–5	Molina (UZB); L 4–5	39 Q	Benyus (HUN); L 14–15	Did not advance						
Niran Czuckermann; Roy Gross; Yaakov Rapoport; Roey Rosenfeld	Men's team foil	—									Japan (JPN); L 27–45	Did not advance				
