= Robert Merrick =

American sailor

Bob Merrick
Personal information
- Full name: Robert M. Merrick
- Born: January 18, 1971 (age 55) New York City, New York, U.S.
Medal record
Men's sailing
Representing the United States
Olympic Games
Silver medal – second place	2000 Sydney	470 class

Robert M. "Bob" Merrick (born January 18, 1971) is an American competitive sailor and Olympic silver medalist.

He won a silver medal in the 470 class at the 2000 Summer Olympics in Sydney, along with his partner Paul Foerster. Merrick was born in New York City, New York.
