= Stefan Böhm =

Polish executioner

Stefan Böhm (other last name versions: Beym, Bem) (December 25, 1741 – February 26, 1813) was a Warsaw executioner.

After leaving medical studies on University of Königsberg he became an official in Karol Stanisław "Panie Kochanku" Radziwiłł lands. Then he joined the Bar Confederation and was seriously injured in the head during a battle with Russian forces in Tyniec. He was saved and fled to Lidzbark Warmiński, where he lived with the local executioner, named Mueller, who taught him this profession.

In 1793, after working as a supervisor over one of the bridges over the Bug River, Böhm was pressured by President of Warsaw Ignacy Wyssogota Zakrzewski to take a job as the Warsaw executioner, which post vacated after Jan Mueller, brother of Lidzbark executioner.

Böhm was very popular among the Warsaw citizens. There was even a saying: you'll go and eat your breakfast at Stefanek's, i.e. "you'll hang".

Böhm carried out most of executions on Targowica Confederation leaders during Kościuszko Uprising.

== Bibliography ==
Feliks Pohorecki (1936). "Böhm Stefan". Polski Słownik Biograficzny. Vol. 2 Beyzym Jan – Brownsford Marja. Kraków: Polska Akademia Umiejętności – Skład Główny w Księgarniach Gebethnera i Wolffa. p. 224. ISBN 83-04-03291-0. Reprint: Zakład Narodowy im. Ossolińskich, Kraków 1989, ISBN 83-04-03291-0
