= Manuel Villareal (Mexican sailor) =

Mexican sailor

Manuel Villarreal
Personal information
- Nationality: Mexican

Sport
- Sport: Sailing

Manuel Villarreal is a Mexican sailor. He competed in the men's 470 event at the 2000 Summer Olympics.
