= Lukas Erni =

Swiss sailor

Personal information
- Nationality: Swiss
- Born: 25 July 1976 (age 50)

Sport
- Sport: Sailing

Lukas Erni (born 25 July 1976) is a Swiss sailor. He competed at the 2000 Summer Olympics and the 2004 Summer Olympics.
