= Sean Nunes =

Jamaican sailor

Personal information
- Nationality: Jamaican
- Born: 12 May 1973 (age 52)

Sport
- Sport: Sailing

Sean Nunes (born 12 May 1973) is a Jamaican sailor. He competed in the men's 470 event at the 2000 Summer Olympics.
