= Sailing at the 2000 Summer Olympics =

Sailing at the Games of the XXVII Olympiad
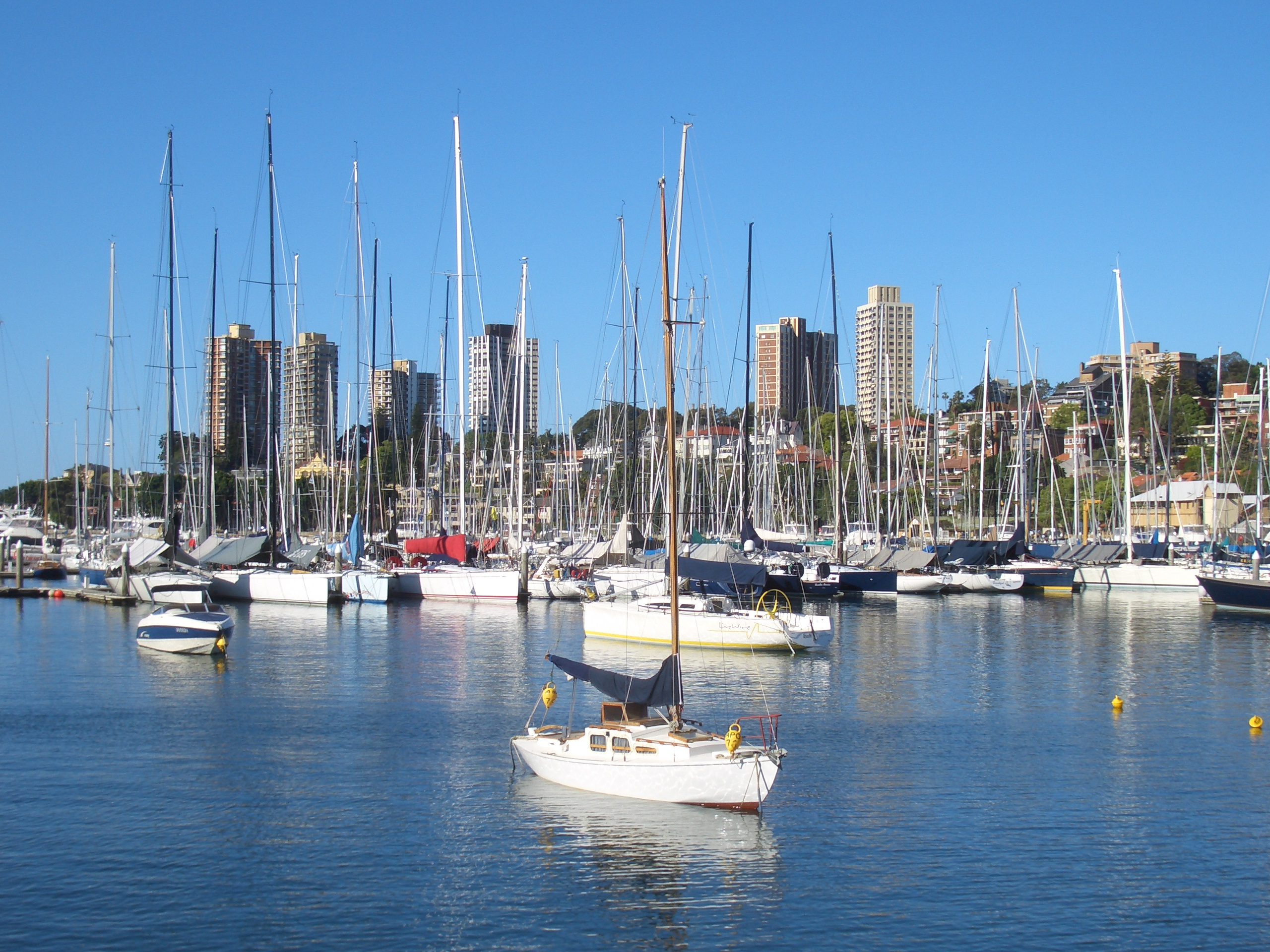
- Rushcutters Bay.
- Venues: Sydney
- Dates: First race: 17 September 2000; Last race: 30 September 2000
- Competitors: 402 (307 men, 95 women)

Sailing at the 2000 Summer Olympics in Sydney was held from 17 to 30 September 2000 at the Olympic Sailing Shore Base in the Sydney Harbour.

The quota for sailing at the 2000 Summer Olympics was 400, of which 124 positions were for men, 92 for women and 184 'open' to men or women. The Sailing Program of 2000 consisted of a total of eleven sailing classes (disciplines). For each class with the exception of the Soling and the 49er, eleven races were scheduled from 17 to 30 September 2000. For the Soling six fleet races were scheduled followed by a series of match races for the top twelve boats of the fleet race result. The 49er had sixteen scheduled fleet races. The sailing was done on six course areas and several types of course configurations.

The Sydney 2000 Games featured a name change for the sport, previously known as yachting.

== Venue ==
Olympic Sailing Shore Base
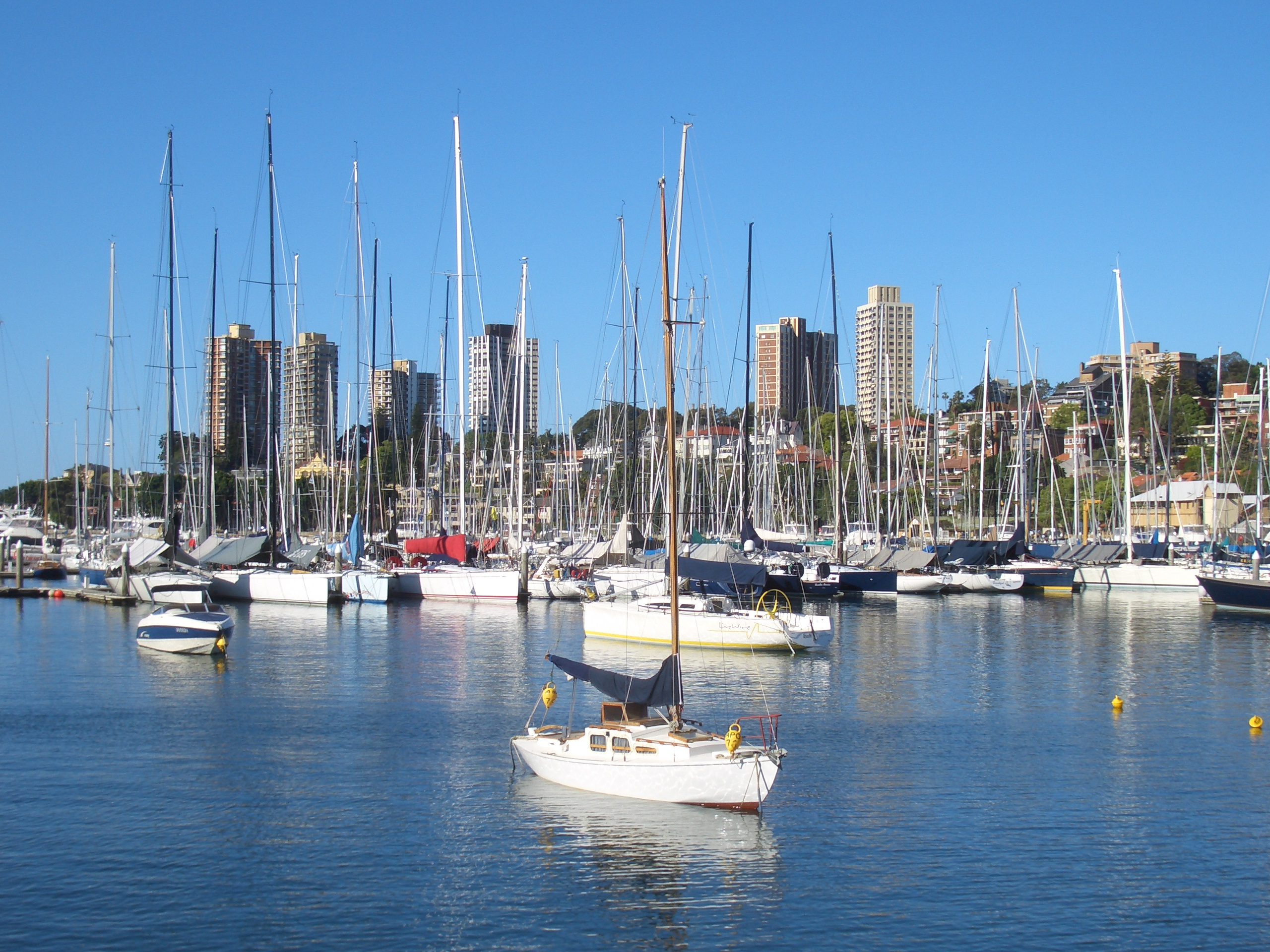
- Interactive map of Olympic Sailing Shore Base
- Coordinates: 33°52′21″S 151°14′06″E

The choice of Sydney Harbour as the sailing venue allowed a huge number of spectators access to the action. However, there was not a great level of interest for this and only 2000 tickets had been sold one month before the start of the event.

The Olympic Sailing Shore Base was located on parts of Rushcutters Bay Park, Yarranabbe Park, the Sir David Martin Reserve and the waters of Rushcutters Bay. The shore base was used for logistic support and competition management and included temporary structures for the sailing events such as a marina for 250 boats. A new permanent public jetty for water taxis was also constructed.

Variable weather patterns necessitated a flexible competition schedule. Four course areas inside Sydney Harbour were used in combination with two offshore course areas. The Soling match racing was staged in Farm Cove at the forecourt of the Sydney Opera House.

== Competition ==
=== Overview ===
Continents	Countries	Classes	Boats	Male	Female
5	78	10	312	307	95

=== Countries ===
Netherlands Antilles	Antigua and Barbuda	Argentina
Australia	Austria	Barbados
Belgium	Bermuda	Belarus
Brazil	Bulgaria	Canada
Cayman Islands	China	Cook Islands
Croatia	Cuba	Cyprus
Czech Republic	Denmark	Spain
Estonia	Fiji	Finland
France	Great Britain	Germany
Greece	Guam	Hong Kong
Hungary	Indonesia	Ireland
Iceland	Israel	Virgin Islands
Italy	Jamaica	Japan
South Korea	Latvia	Lithuania
Morocco	Malaysia	Mexico
Malta	Netherlands	Norway
New Zealand	Peru	Poland
Portugal	South Africa	Russia
Seychelles	Singapore	Slovenia
Sri Lanka	Switzerland	Slovakia
Sweden	Thailand	Chinese Taipei
Turkey	Ukraine	Uruguay
United States	Venezuela

=== Classes (equipment) ===
Class	Type	Event	Sailors	Trapeze	Mainsail	Jibb/Genoa	Spinnaker	First OG	Olympics so far
Mistral One Design Class	Surfboard		1	0	+	-	-	1996	2
Mistral One Design Class	Surfboard		1	0	+	-	-	1996	2
Europe	Dinghy		1	0	+	-	-	1992	3
Laser	Dinghy		1	0	+	-	-	1996	2
Finn	Dinghy		1	0	+	-	-	1952	13
470	Dinghy		2	1	+	+	+	1988	4
470	Dinghy		2	1	+	+	+	1976	7
49er	Skiff		2	2	+	+	+	2000	1
Tornado	Multihull		2	2	+	+	+	1976	7
Star	Keelboat		2	0	+	+	-	1932	15
Soling	Keelboat		3	0	+	+	+	1972	8

2000 Olympic Classes designs

== Medal summary ==
=== Women's Events ===
Games	Gold	Silver	Bronze
2000: Women's Mistral One Design	Italy (ITA); Alessandra Sensini	Germany (GER); Amelie Lux	New Zealand (NZL); Barbara Kendall
2000: Europe	Great Britain (GBR); Shirley Robertson	Netherlands (NED); Margriet Matthijsse	Argentina (ARG); Serena Amato
2000: Women's 470	Australia (AUS); Jenny Armstrong; Belinda Stowell	United States (USA); J. J. Isler; Sarah Glaser	Ukraine (UKR); Ruslana Taran; Olena Pakholchik

=== Men's Events ===
Games	Gold	Silver	Bronze
2000: Men's Mistral One Design	Austria (AUT); Christoph Sieber	Argentina (ARG); Carlos Espinola	New Zealand (NZL); Aaron McIntosh
2000: Finn	Great Britain (GBR); Iain Percy	Italy (ITA); Luca Devoti	Sweden (SWE); Fredrik Lööf
2000: Men's 470	Australia (AUS); Tom King; Mark Turnbull	United States (USA); Paul Foerster; Robert Merrick	Argentina (ARG); Javier Conte; Juan de la Fuente

=== Open Events ===
Games	Gold	Silver	Bronze
2000: Laser	Great Britain (GBR); Ben Ainslie	Brazil (BRA); Robert Scheidt	Australia (AUS); Michael Blackburn
2000: 49er	Finland (FIN); Thomas Johanson; Jyrki Järvi	Great Britain (GBR); Ian Barker; Simon Hiscocks	United States (USA); Jonathan McKee; Charlie McKee
2000: Tornado	Austria (AUT); Roman Hagara; Hans-Peter Steinacher	Australia (AUS); Darren Bundock; John Forbes	Germany (GER); Roland Gäbler; René Schwall
2000: Star	United States (USA); Mark Reynolds; Magnus Liljedahl	Great Britain (GBR); Ian Walker; Mark Covell	Brazil (BRA); Torben Grael; Marcelo Ferreira
2000: Soling	Denmark (DEN); Jesper Bank; Henrik Blakskjær; Thomas Jacobsen	Germany (GER); Jochen Schümann; Gunnar Bahr; Ingo Borkowski	Norway (NOR); Herman Horn Johannessen; Paul Davis; Espen Stokkeland

== Medal table ==
Rank	Nation	Gold	Silver	Bronze	Total
1	Great Britain	3	2	0	5
2	Australia	2	1	1	4
3	Austria	2	0	0	2
4	United States	1	2	1	4
5	Italy	1	1	0	2
6	Denmark	1	0	0	1
6	Finland	1	0	0	1
8	Germany	0	2	1	3
9	Argentina	0	1	2	3
10	Brazil	0	1	1	2
11	Netherlands	0	1	0	1
12	New Zealand	0	0	2	2
13	Norway	0	0	1	1
13	Sweden	0	0	1	1
13	Ukraine	0	0	1	1
Totals (15 entries)		11	11	11	33

== Bibliography ==
- The Atlanta Committee for the Olympic Games (1997). The Official Report of the Centennial Olympic Games, Volume I Planning and Organization (PDF). Atlanta: Peachtree Publishers. Archived from the original (PDF) on 23 August 2011.
- The Atlanta Committee for the Olympic Games (1997). The Official Report of the Centennial Olympic Games, Volume II The Centennial Olympic Games (PDF). Atlanta: Peachtree Publishers. Archived from the original (PDF) on 23 August 2011.
- The Atlanta Committee for the Olympic Games (1997). The Official Report of the Centennial Olympic Games, Volume III The Competition Results (PDF). Atlanta: Peachtree Publishers.
- Hugh Drake & Paul Henderson (2009). Canada's Olympic Sailing Legacy, Paris 1924 - Beijing 2008. Toronto: CYA.
- Evans, Hilary; Gjerde, Arild; Heijmans, Jeroen; Mallon, Bill; et al. "Sailing at the 2000 Atlanta Summer Games". Olympics at Sports-Reference.com. Sports Reference LLC. Archived from the original on 17 April 2020.
- "IYRU Olympic Update". ISAF. Archived from the original on 2 April 2012.
