= Taekwondo at the 2003 Summer Universiade =

Taekwondo competition

Taekwondo at the XXII Summer Universiade
- Venue: Kyeongbuk High School
- Dates: August 22, 2003 – August 26, 2003

The taekwondo competition in the 2003 Summer Universiade were held in Daegu, South Korea.

== Medal overview ==
=== Men's events ===
Event	Gold	Silver	Bronze
54 kg	Daniel Elkowitz; United States	Abdulkadir Dolaş; Turkey	Igor Leanovich; Belarus; Phichet Phibunkhanrak; Thailand
58 kg	Chu Mu-Yen; Chinese Taipei	Kıvanç Dinçsalman; Turkey	Soheil Molana; Iran; Ludovic Vo; France
62 kg	Park Tae-Youl; South Korea	Behzad Khodadad; Iran	Márcio Ferreira; Brazil; Miltiadis Gouroufidis; Greece
67 kg	Oh Hyoung-Geun; South Korea	Yerkin Aisa; Kazakhstan	Ruford Hamon; United States; Aritz Itxisoa; Spain
72 kg	Carlo Molfetta; Italy	Petro Davydov; Ukraine	Chen Shihkai; Chinese Taipei; Nir David Moriah; Israel
78 kg	Kim Hak-Hwan; South Korea	Ali Tajik; Iran	Tomislav Bucanac; Croatia; Liao Chiahsing; Chinese Taipei
84 kg	Choi Seong-Ho; South Korea	Vasiliy Terentiyev; Russia	Frederico Mitooka; Brazil; Hamid Sarabadani; Iran
Over 84 kg	Mickael Borot; France	Lee Deok-Hwi; South Korea	Aleksandr Kolmykov; Russia; Lin Wencheng; Chinese Taipei

=== Women's events ===
Event	Gold	Silver	Bronze
47 kg	Viktoriya Fomenko; Russia	Elaia Torrontegoi; Spain	Kavita Kumar; Australia; Amanda Thome; United States
51 kg	Jang Eun-Suk; South Korea	Wu Yenni; Chinese Taipei	Yaowapa Boorapolchai; Thailand; Jennifer Delgado; Spain
55 kg	Zhao Ya; China	Chang Chiungfang; Chinese Taipei	Rebecca Peterson; United States; Elaine Teo; Malaysia
59 kg	Kim Sae-Rom; South Korea	Cristiana Corsi; Italy	Stephanie Beckel; United States; Chi Shu-ju; Chinese Taipei
63 kg	Han Jin-Sun; South Korea	Darcy Kimmich; United States	Olga Cherkun; Ukraine; Gwladys Épangue; France
67 kg	Hwang Kyung-Hwa; South Korea	Ibone Lallane; Spain	Sarah Bainbridge; Great Britain; Yvonne Oude Luttikhuis; Netherlands
72 kg	Kim Mi-Hyun; South Korea	Natália Falavigna; Brazil	Alesiya Charnyovskaya; Belarus; Claudia Veronica Theurel; Mexico
Over 72 kg	Kim Soon-Ki; South Korea	Mariya Zhurovskaya; Belarus	Danuza Castro; Brazil; Wang Daqing; China

== Medal table ==
* Host nation (South Korea)

Rank	Nation	Gold	Silver	Bronze	Total
1	South Korea*	10	1	0	11
2	Chinese Taipei	1	2	4	7
3	United States	1	1	4	6
4	Russia	1	1	1	3
5	Italy	1	1	0	2
6	France	1	0	2	3
7	China	1	0	1	2
8	Iran	0	2	2	4
8	Spain	0	2	2	4
10	Turkey	0	2	0	2
11	Brazil	0	1	3	4
12	Belarus	0	1	2	3
13	Ukraine	0	1	1	2
14	Kazakhstan	0	1	0	1
15	Thailand	0	0	2	2
16	Australia	0	0	1	1
16	Croatia	0	0	1	1
16	Great Britain	0	0	1	1
16	Greece	0	0	1	1
16	Israel	0	0	1	1
16	Malaysia	0	0	1	1
16	Mexico	0	0	1	1
16	Netherlands	0	0	1	1
Totals (23 entries)		16	16	32	64
