= Marcel Troupel =

French sailor (1930–2019)

Marcel Troupel (6 May 1930 – 27 September 2019) was a French sailor who competed in the 1972 Summer Olympics.
