= Marcell Goszleth =

Hungarian sailor

Personal information
- Nationality: Hungarian
- Born: 23 November 1976 (age 48); Budapest, Hungary

Sport
- Sport: Sailing

Marcell Goszleth (born 23 November 1976) is a Hungarian sailor. He competed in the men's 470 event at the 2000 Summer Olympics.
