= Ian Barker (sailor) =

British sailor

Personal information
- Nationality: British
- Born: 10 August 1966 (age 59) Cardiff, Wales
- Height: 183 cm (6 ft 0 in)
- Weight: 76 kg (168 lb)

Sailing career
- Sport: Sailing
- Club: Penarth Yacht Club; Hayling Island Sailing Club
- Class: 49er
Medal record
Sailing
Representing Great Britain
Olympic Games
Silver medal – second place	2000 Sydney	49er
World Championships
Gold medal – first place	1993 Travemünde, Germany	505
Silver medal – second place	1995 Hong Kong	Flying Fifteen
Bronze medal – third place	1996 Townsville, Australia	505
Bronze medal – third place	1998 Hyannis, United States	505

Ian Barker (born 10 August 1966 in Cardiff) is a British sailor. He won a silver medal in the High Performance Dinghy class at the 2000 Summer Olympics with Simon Hiscocks. He lives in Christchurch, England. He coached the Irish 49er team for Rio 2016 Olympics.
