= Ádám Szörényi =

Hungarian sailor

Personal information
- Nationality: Hungarian
- Born: 9 November 1977 (age 47); Budapest, Hungary

Sport
- Sport: Sailing

Ádám Szörényi (born 9 November 1977) is a Hungarian sailor. He competed in the men's 470 event at the 2000 Summer Olympics.
