= Tom King (sailor) =

Australian sailor

Medal record

Representing Australia

Sailing

Olympic Games
Gold medal – first place	2000 Sydney	470 class

Thomas Jack King OAM (born 8 February 1973) is an Australian sailor and Olympic champion. He won a gold medal in the 470 class with Mark Turnbull at the 2000 Summer Olympics in Sydney. He and Turnbull were inducted into the Australian Sailing Hall of Fame in 2022.
