= Marcel-André Buffet =

French sailor

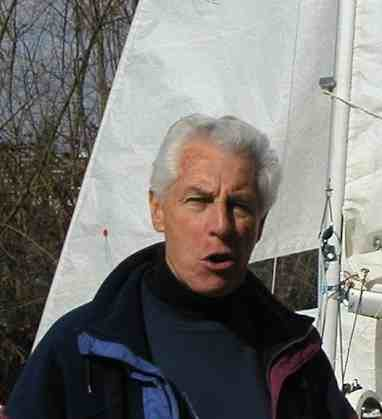

Personal information
- Nationality: French
- Born: 14 May 1922; Arras, France
- Died: 20 August 2009 (aged 87); Boulogne-Billancourt, France

Sport
- Sport: Sailing

Marcel-André Buffet (14 May 1922 – 20 August 2009) was a French sailor. He competed in the Flying Dutchman event at the 1964 Summer Olympics.
