= Mikhail Protasevich =

Belarusian sailor

Personal information
- Nationality: Belarusian
- Born: 22 December 1971 (age 53); Minsk, Belarus

Sport
- Sport: Sailing

Mikhail Protasevich (born 22 December 1971) is a Belarusian sailor. He competed in the men's 470 event at the 2000 Summer Olympics.
