= Nickol Tal =

Israeli fencer

Personal information
- Native name: ניקול טל
- Nationality: Israeli
- Born: 27 July 1994 (age 31)

Sport
- Country: (Israel)
- Sport: Fencing
- Event: Epee
- Club: Maccabi Maalot
Medal record
Junior World Fencing Championships
Bronze medal – third place	2014 Plovdiv	Épée Individual
Universiade
Bronze medal – third place	2019 Naples	Épée Individual

Nickol Tal (Hebrew: ניקול טל; born 27 July 1994) is an Israeli fencer.

She won a bronze medal in women's epee at the 2014 Junior World Fencing Championships, and a bronze medal in women's epee at the 2019 Summer Universiade in Naples, Italy. Her club is Maccabi Maalot.

== See also ==
- Israel at the 2019 Summer Universiade
