= Peter Nicholas (sailor) =

New Zealand sailor

Personal information
- Nationality: New Zealand
- Born: 21 August 1963 (age 61); Taupō, New Zealand
- Height: 191 cm (6 ft 3 in)
- Weight: 71 kg (157 lb)

Sport
- Sport: Sailing

Peter Owen Nicholas (born 21 August 1963) is a New Zealand sailor. He competed in the men's 470 event at the 2000 Summer Olympics.
