= Gregory Rudelson =

Israeli judoka and belt wrestler

Personal information
- Native name: גרגורי רודלסון
- Born: 17 March 1988 (age 38)
- Occupation: Judoka

Sport
- Country: Israel
- Sport: Judo, Belt wrestling
- Weight class: ‍–‍100 kg, +100 kg
Medal record
Representing Israel
Men's judo
Maccabiah Games
Silver medal – second place	2009 Tel Aviv	‍–‍100 kg
Men's belt wrestling
World University Games
Bronze medal – third place	2013 Kazan	+100 kg

Profile at external databases
- IJF: 15445
- JudoInside.com: 33816
- Updated on 5 January 2025

Gregory Rudelson (Hebrew: גרגורי רודלסון; born 17 March 1988) is an Israeli judoka and belt wrestler.

== Sports career ==
In the Israeli Championships in judo, Rudelson came in second in the ‍–‍100 kg in 2006 and 2007, second in the +100 kg in 2009, 2012 and 2014, and won the championship in the +100 kg in 2013.

In the European Cup Juniors in judo Rudelson won the 2007 A-Tournament U20 in Manisa in the ‍–‍100 kg, and won a silver medal in the A-Tournament U20 Manisa in the +100 kg.

Rudelson took fifth place in the 2007 European Junior Judo Championships in Prague in the ‍–‍100 kg.

In the 2009 Maccabiah Games Rudelson won a silver medal in judo in the ‍–‍100 kg weightclass.

Rudelson competed in belt wrestling at the 2013 Summer Universiade in Men's Classic Style, and won a bronze medal in the +100 kg category.
