= Eldad Ronen =

Israeli sailor

Elad Ronen
Personal information
- Native name: אלעד רונן
- Nationality: Israel
- Born: September 4, 1976 (age 49) Tiberias, Israel
- Height: 6 ft 1.5 in (186.7 cm)
- Weight: 168 lb (76 kg)

Sailing career
- Sport: Sailing
- Classes: Laser II; Men's 420 Two-Person Dinghy; Men's 470 Two-Person Dinghy

Elad Ronen (Hebrew: אלעד רונן; born September 4, 1976) is an Israeli competitive sailor. He was born in Tiberias, Israel. When Ronen competed in the Olympics he was 6 ft 1.5 in (186.7 cm) tall, and weighed 168 lb (76 kg).

== Sailing career ==
In 1991 Ronen came in 4th in 420 in the IYRU Youth Sailing World Championships, in Largs, Scotland.

In 1993 he won the gold medal in Laser II in the IYRU Youth Sailing World Championships, in Lake Garda, Italy. In 1995 Ronen won the gold medal in the 470 Open Junior World Championship, in Warnemunde, Germany.

In 1999 Ronen and Eli Zuckerman came in 9th in the Men's / Mixed 470 World Championship, in Melbourne, Australia. They were ranked Number 9 in the world during 1999.

Ronen, at the age of 24, and Eli Zuckerman competed for Israel at the 2000 Summer Olympics in Rushcutters Bay Marina, Rose Bay, New South Wales, Australia, in men's 470 Two-Person Dinghy. They came in 13th out of 29 boats.
