= Golan Gutt =

Israeli basketball player (born 1994)

Golan Gutt גולן גוט
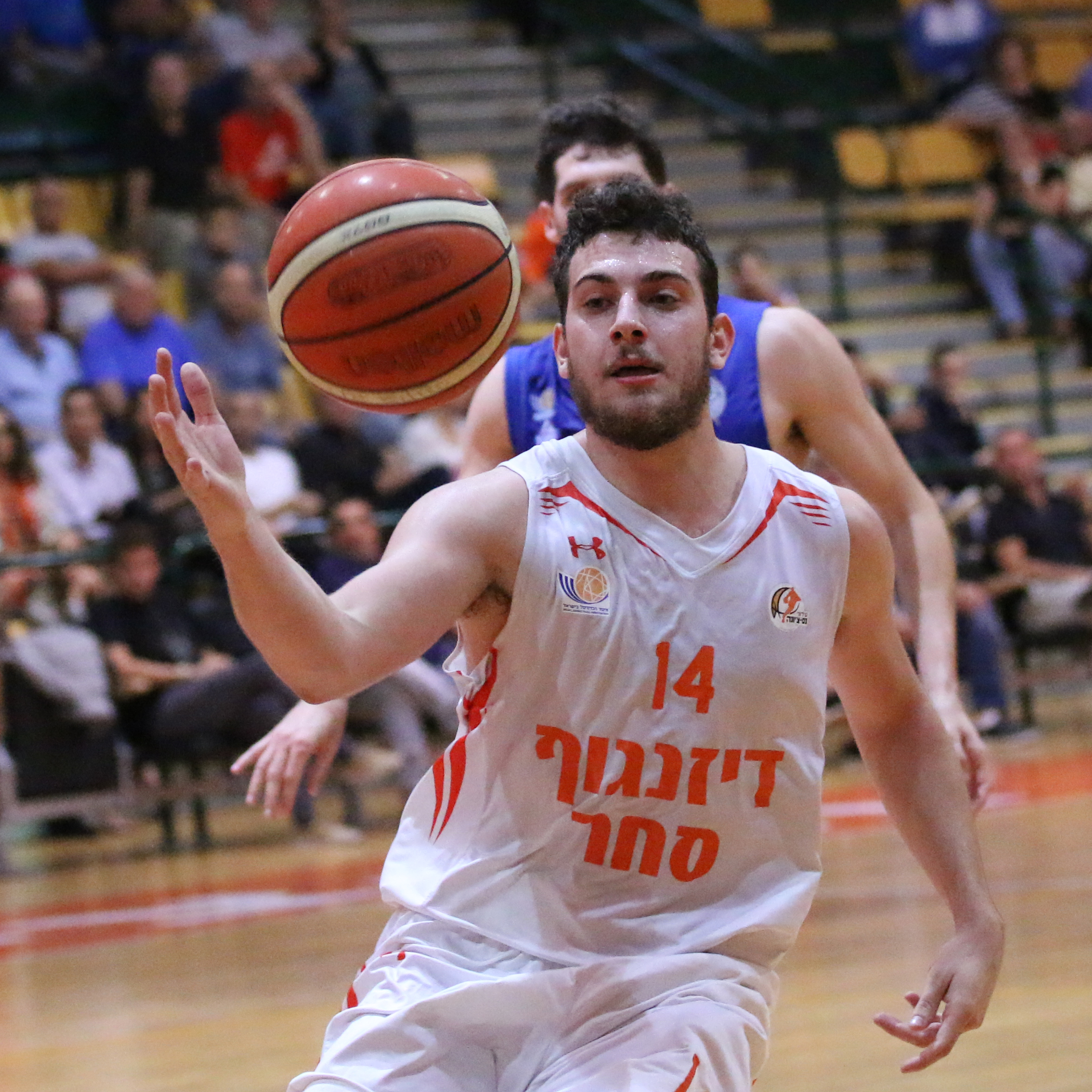
- Gutt playing for Ironi Nes Ziona in 2016

No. 7 – Hapoel Be'er Sheva
- Position: Shooting guard
- League: Israeli Basketball Premier League

Personal information
- Born: November 7, 1994 (age 32) Netanya, Israel
- Listed height: 1.95 m (6 ft 5 in)

Career information
- NBA draft: 2016: undrafted
- Playing career: 2011–present

Career history
- 2011–2013: Hapoel Lev Hasharon
- 2013–2015: Hapoel Tel Aviv
- 2014–2015: →Maccabi Ra'anana
- 2015–2016: Maccabi Rishon LeZion
- 2016–2020: Ironi Ness Ziona
- 2020–2021: Maccabi Rishon LeZion
- 2021–2023: Ironi Ness Ziona
- 2023–2024: Hebraica Macabi
- 2025–2026: Maccabi Rishon LeZion
- 2026–present: Hapoel Be'er Sheva

Career highlights
- Israeli Premier League champion (2016); Israeli National League champion (2017)

Golan Gutt (Hebrew: גולן גוט; born November 7, 1994) is an Israeli professional basketball player for Hapoel Be'er Sheva of the Israeli Basketball Premier League. Standing at 6 ft 4 in (1.93 m), he plays at the shooting guard position.

== Early years ==
Gutt was born in Netanya, Israel. He played for Even Yehuda youth teams. In 2012, Gutt joined KK Split youth academy in Croatia.

== Professional career ==
=== Early years (2011–2016) ===
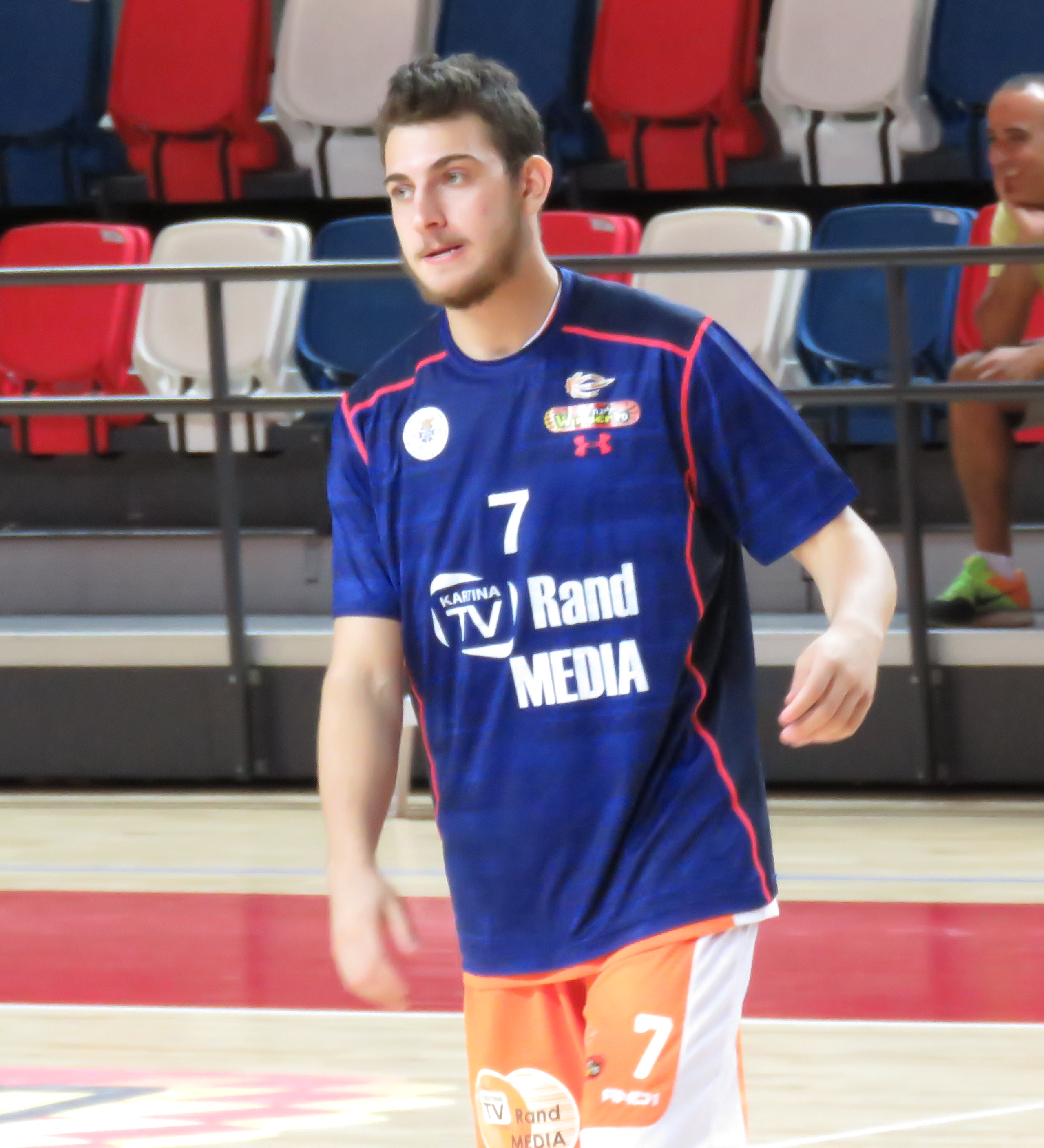
Gutt with Maccabi Rishon LeZion in September 2015

Gutt started his professional career with Hapoel Lev Hasharon of the Liga Leumit in the 2011–12 season.

On August 11, 2013, Gutt signed a three-year contract with Hapoel Tel Aviv. In his second season with Hapoel Tel Aviv, Gutt was loaned to Maccabi Ra'anana of the Liga Leumit. In 12 games for Ra'anana, he averaged 6.1 points, 2 rebounds and 1 assist per game.

On July 23, 2015, Gutt signed a two-year contract with Maccabi Rishon LeZion. He helped Rishon LeZion win the 2016 Israeli League championship

=== Ironi Nes Ziona (2016–2020) ===
On August 23, 2016, Gutt signed a two-year deal with Ironi Nes Ziona of the Liga Leumit. In his first season with Nes Ziona, Gutt helped Nes Ziona promote to the Israeli Premier League. On November 7, 2017, Gutt scored a season-high 21 points in his 23rd birthday, shooting 6-for-6 from three-point range in an 87–77 win over Maccabi Ashdod.

On July 10, 2018, Gutt signed a one-year contract extension with Ironi Nes Ziona. On May 20, 2019, Gutt recorded a career-high 23 points, along with four rebounds, two assists and three steals in a 91–90 win over Hapoel Gilboa Galil. In 36 Israeli League games played during the 2018–19 season, he averaged 10.7 points, 3.9 rebounds, 2.1 assists and 1.4 steals per game. Gutt helped Nes Ziona reach the 2019 Israeli League Playoffs, where they eventually were eliminated by Hapoel Eilat.

On July 8, 2019, Gutt re-signed with Nes Ziona for the 2019–20 season.

=== Maccabi Rishon LeZion (2020–2021) ===
On August 10, 2020, Gutt returned to Maccabi Rishon LeZion, signing a one-year deal.

=== Ironi Ness Ziona (2021–2023) ===
On July 20, 2021, he has signed with Ironi Ness Ziona of the Israeli Basketball Super League (IBSL).

== National team career ==
Gutt is a member of the Israeli national basketball team. On February 21, 2019, Gutt made his first appearance for the Israeli team in an 81–77 win over Germany, scoring eight points off the bench.

Gutt was also a member of the Israeli Under-20 national team. In July 2014, he participated in the 2014 FIBA Europe Under-20 Championship, where he averaged 8.7 points and 3 rebounds per game.

== Personal life ==
Gutt's father, Danny, is a former professional basketball player and current coach. Gutt is also the nephew of the former basketball player and former coach David Blatt and cousin of current basketball player Tamir Blatt.
