= Andrew Gooding =

Jamaican sailor

Personal information
- Nationality: Jamaican
- Born: 31 January 1964 (age 61)

Sport
- Sport: Sailing

Andrew Gooding (born 31 January 1964) is a Jamaican sailor. He competed at the 1992 Summer Olympics, the 1996 Summer Olympics, and the 2000 Summer Olympics.
