= Anat Fabrikant =

Israeli sailor

Personal information
- Native name: ענת פבריקנט
- Full name: Anat Fabrikant-Kreiz
- Nationality: Israel
- Born: September 14, 1975 (age 51) Tel Aviv, Israel
- Height: 5 ft 8.5 in (174.0 cm)
- Weight: 146 lb (66 kg)

Sailing career
- Sport: Sailing
- Club: Hapoel Tel Aviv
- Class: 470
Medal record
Representing Israel
Summer Universiade
Bronze medal – third place	1999 Palma de Mallorca	470 class

Anat Fabrikant-Kreiz (Hebrew: ענת פבריקנט; born September 14, 1975) is an Israeli former Olympic competitive sailor.

== Personal life ==
She was born in Tel Aviv, Israel, and is Jewish. She is married to Ynon Kreiz, Co-CEO of Paramount-Skydance Corporation.

== Sailing career ==
She began competing in sailing at the age of 12. Her club was Hapoel Tel Aviv. When she participated in the Olympics she was 5 ft 8.5 in (174 cm) tall, and weighed 146 lb (66 kg).

She and Shani Kedmi placed 8th at the 1995 European Championships in the 470 competition.

She represented Israel at the 1996 Summer Olympics in Atlanta, Georgia, at the age of 20 in Sailing—Women's Two Person Dinghy 470 event with Kedmi, and came in 12th.

In 1999, she and Kedmi won a bronze medal representing Israel at the 1999 Summer Universiade, placed 4th at both the European and World Championships, and were ranked No. 2 in the world. In 2000 they finished 6th at the 2000 European Championships.

She represented Israel at the 2000 Summer Olympics in Sydney, Australia, at the age of 24 in Sailing—Women's Two Person Dinghy 470 event with Kedmi, and came in 4th, two points behind the bronze medal-winning team from Ukraine.

In 2002, she and Linur Kliger finished 2nd in the European 470 Dinghy Championship in Palma de Mallorca, Spain, and 20th at the World Championships. As of October 1, 2002, the two were ranked No. 8 in the world.

She retired from competitive sailing in 2003. She at the time was studying for a master's degree, and presenting a TV program on Sport TV.
