= Sabot =

Sabot may refer to:

- Sabot (firearms), disposable supportive device used in gunpowder ammunitions to fit/patch around a sub-caliber projectile
- Sabot (shoe), a type of wooden shoe

== People ==
- Dick Sabot (1944–2005), American economist and businessman
- Hamilton Sabot (born 1987), French gymnast

== Vessels ==
- Sabot (dinghy), a type of leeboard dinghy
- Naples Sabot, a type of centerboard dinghy
- US Sabot, an American sailing dinghy
- USS Sabot (SP-213), a motorboat acquired by but never commissioned into the United States Navy

== Other uses ==
- Sabot (newspaper), a former US newspaper
- Le Sabot, a mansion in Senneville, Quebec, Canada
- Manakin Sabot, Virginia, an unincorporated community
