= Optimist World Championship =

International annual sailing competition

The Optimist World Championship is an annual World Championship sailing regatta in the Optimist class organised by the International Optimist Dinghy Association. One of, if not the largest regatta of the optimist class.

== Events ==
Event			Host			Participation					Ref.
Ed.	Dates	Year	Host club	Location	Country	No.			Nat.	Cont	Ref.
1		1962		Hamble	United Kingdom				3		
2		1963		Göteborg	Sweden				5		
3		1964		Aarhus	Denmark				7		
4		1965		Turku	Finland				9		
5		1966		Miami	United States				6		
6		1967		Neusiedlersee	Austria				10		
7		1968		Carantec	France				16		
8		1969		Stokes Bay	United Kingdom				12		
9		1970		Arenys de Mar	Spain				14		
10		1971		Malente	West Germany				13		
11		1972		Karlskrona	Sweden				15		
N/A		1973			Rhodesia	Cancelled					
12		1974		St. Moritz/Silvaplana	Switzerland				20		
13		1975		Aarhus	Denmark				23		
14		1976		Yarımca	Turkey				19		
15		1977		Koper	Yugoslavia				22		
16		1978		La Baule	France				25		
17		1979		Pattaya	Thailand				16		
18		1980		Cascais	Portugal				24		
19	20–30 July	1981		Howth	Ireland				24		
20		1982		Follonica	Italy				26		
21	13–24 July	1983		Rio de Janeiro	Brazil				22		
22	11–27 July	1984		Kingston	Canada				28		
23	24 Jul – 4 Aug	1985		Helsinki	Finland				32		
24	4–15 Aug	1986		Roses	Spain				29		
25	25 July – 7 Aug	1987		Andijk	Netherlands				29		
26	16–29 July	1988		La Rochelle	France				32		
28		1989		Yokohama	Japan				30		
29	Cascais	1990			Portugal				38		
30		1991		Porto Carras	Greece				39		
31		1992		Mar del Plata	Argentina				29		
32	12–24 July	1993		Ciutadella de Menorca	Spain				41		
33		1994		Sardinia	Italy				39		
34		1995		Mariehamn	Finland				41		
35		1996		Langebaan	South Africa				39		
36	28Jul -8Aug	1997		Carrickfergus, Northern Ireland	United Kingdom				41		
37		1998		Setúbal	Portugal				44		
37	14–25 July	1999	Fort de France Bay	Les Trois Ilets - Martinique	France				47		
38	17–30 July	2000		A Coruña	Spain				59		
39	12–23 Jul	2001		Qingdao	China	208	171	37	44	6	
40	3–14 Jul	2002	Corpus Christi Yacht Club	Corpus Christi	United States	208			46	6	
41	23 Jul – 3 Aug	2003	Real Club Nautico de Gran Canaria	Las Palmas	Spain	221			50	6	
42	14–25 July	2004	Salinas Yacht Club	Salinas	Ecuador	215			52	6	
43	25 July – 5 August	2005		St. Moritz	Switzerland	241	201	40	52	6	
44	29 Dec –9 Jan	2006/07	National Yacht Club of Uruguay	Montevideo	Uruguay	228			50	6	
45	22 Jul –1 Aug	2007	Yacht Club Cagliari	Sardinia	Italy	251	209	42	55	6	
46	14–25 July	2008		Çeşme	Turkey	250	204	46	53	6	
47	4–15 Aug	2009		Niterói	Brazil	211	175	36	47	6	
48	27Dec –7 Jan	2009/10		Langkawi	Malaysia	231	188	43	55	6	
49	28–8 Jan	2011/12	Napier Sailing Club	Napier	New Zealand	210	172	38	48	6	
50	15–26 July	2012	Club Nautico Santo Domingo	Santo Domingo	Dominican Republic	230	190	40	55	6	
51	15–26 July	2013	Fraglia Vela Riva	Riva del Garda	Italy	257	214	43	58	6	
52	22 Oct – 2 Nov	2014	Club Náutico San Isidro	Buenos Aires	Argentina	207	163	44	49	6	
53	25 Aug –5 Sep	2015		Dziwnów	Poland	179	145	34	48	5	
54	21 Jun –4 Jul	2016		Vilamoura	Portugal	255					
55	11–21 July	2017	Royal Varuna Yacht Club	Pattaya	Thailand	281					
56	29Aug –5 Sep	2018	Famagusta Nautical Club	Limassol	Cyprus	264	213	51	57	6	
57	8–15 July	2019	Antigua Yacht Club	Antigua	Antigua and Barbuda	255	209	46	65	6	
N/A	1-11 Jul	2020	Fraglia Vela Riva	Riva del Garda	Italy	CANCELLED DUE TO COVID					
58	2–9 July	2021	Fraglia Vela Riva	Riva del Garda	Italy	259	206	53	57	5	
59	29 June – 6 July	2022	Bodrum Sailing Club	Bodrum	Turkey	276	218	58	61	6	
60	17–24 June	2023	Club Vela Ballena Alegre	Sant Pere Pescador	Spain	248	184	64	54	6	
61	5–14 Dec	2024	Club Náutico Mar del Plata	Mar del Plata	Argentina	225	162	63	51	6	
62	28 June – 5 July	2025	Jadralni klub pirat Portorož	Portorož	Slovenia	287	218	69	66	6	
63	20–27 June	2026	Royal Yacht Club de Tanger	Tangier	Morocco	284	214	70	70	6	

== Medalists ==
Year	Gold	Silver	Bronze	1st Female	Ref.
1962	Anders Quiding (SWE)				
1963	B. Baysen (SWE)				
1964	Poul Andersen (DEN)				
1965	Ray Larsson (SWE)				
1966	Doug Bull (USA)				
1967	Peter Warrer (DEN)				
1968	Peter Warrer (DEN)	Henrik Söderlund	Doug Bull	Claudia Stokes (USA)	
1969	Doug Bull (USA)			Claudia Stokes (USA)	
1970	James Larimore (USA)	Lennart Roos (SWE)	Ake Hansson (SWE)	Nina Koepke (NOR)	
1971	Heikki Vahtera (FIN)				
1972	Tomás Estela (ESP)	Martin Palsson (SWE)	Don Nordquist (SWE)		
1973	Cancelled due to the political situation in 1973 in Rhodesia				
1974	Martín Billoch (ARG)	Hans Wallén (SWE)	Hans Fester (DEN)		
1975	Hans Fester (DEN)	Mattias Söderström (SWE)	Martin Schröder (SWE)		
1976	Hans Wallén (SWE)	Jens Asbjørn Hansen (DEN)	Allen Lindsey (USA)		
1977	Patrik Mark (SWE)	Mads Damsgaard (DEN)	Heinrich Evers (DEN)		
1978	Rickard Hammarvid (SWE)	Peter von Koskull (FIN)	Patrik Mark (SWE)		
1979	Johan Peterson (SWE)	Marko Heiskanen (FIN)	Mads Storgaard (DEN)	Silvia Depares (ESP)	
1980	Johan Peterson (SWE)	Rasmus Damsgaard (DEN)	Marko Heiskanen (FIN)	Silvia Depares (ESP)	
1981	Guido Tavelli (ARG)	Johan Peterson (SWE)	Edson Araujo (BRA)	Denise Lyttle (IRL)	
1982	Njaal Sletten (NOR)	Christian Rasmussen (DEN)	Søren Ebdrup (DEN)	Florence Rigolot (FRA)	
1983	Jordi Calafat (ESP)	José Carlos Frau (ESP)	Jean-Pierre Becquet (FRA)	Florence Rigolot (FRA)	
1984	Serge Kats (NED)	Jussi Wikström (FIN)	Xavier García (ESP)	Veronique Ravet (FRA)	
1985	Serge Kats (NED)	Risto Tapper (FIN)	Martín Castrillo (ARG)	Nuria Bover (ESP)	
1986	Xavier García (ESP)	Luis Martínez (ESP)	Risto Tapper (FIN)	Isobel Hens (BEL)	
1987	Sabrina Landi (ITA)	Luis Martínez (ESP)	Anders Jonsson (SWE)	Sabrina Landi (ITA)	
1988	Ugo Vanello (ITA)	Luis Martínez (ESP)	Gabriel Tarrasa (ESP)	Maria Mylona (GRE)	
1989	Peder Rønholt (DEN)	Rami Koskinen (FIN)	Herman Rosso (ARG)	Suzanne Ward (DEN)	
1990	Martín di Pinto (ARG)	Agustín Krevisky (ARG)	Martin Strandberg (SWE)	Natalie Gunst (BEL)	
1991	Agustín Krevisky (ARG)	Asdrubal García (ARG)	Andre Sørensen (DEN)	Gaia Lusini (ITA)	
1992	Ramón Oliden (ARG)	Marc Patiño (ESP)	Mike Keser (GER)	Claudia Tosi (ITA)	
1993	Mats Hellman (NED)	Estebán Rocha (ARG)	Claudia Tosi (ITA)	3rd / Claudia Tosi (ITA)	
1994	Martín Jenkins (ARG)	Federico Pérez (ARG)	Julio Alsogaray (ARG)	Johanna Saerna (SWE)	
1995	Martín Jenkins (ARG)	Frederico Rizzo (BRA)	Dario Kliba (CRO)	Lisa Westerhof (NED)	
1996	Lisa Westerhof (NED)	Aron Lolić (CRO)	Ivan Bertaglia (ITA)	1st / Lisa Westerhof (NED)	
1997	Luca Bursic (ITA)	Matías Bühler (ARG)	Nicholas Raygada (PER)	10th / Siren Sundby (NOR)	
1998	Mattia Pressich (ITA)	Fernando Gwozdz (ARG)	Šime Fantela (CRO)	Tina Celigoj (SLO)	
1999	Mattia Pressich (ITA)	Tonči Stipanović (CRO)	Mario Coutinho (POR)	11th / Roberta Borges (BRA)	
2000	Šime Fantela (CRO)	Lucas Calabrese (ARG)	Jaro Furlani (ITA)	20th / Stéphanie Brulon (FRA)	
2001	Lucas Calabrese (ARG)	Zhu Ye (CHN)	Abdul Rahim (MAS)	10th / Xu Lijia (CHN)	
2002	Filip Matika (CRO)	Stjepan Ćesić (CRO)	Eduardo Zalvide (ESP)	6th / Xu Lijia (CHN)	
2003	Filip Matika (CRO)	Jesse Kirkland (BER)	Sebastián Peri Brusa (ARG)	5th / Hannah Mills (GBR)	
2004	Wei Ni (CHN)	Paul Snow-Hansen (NZL)	Eugenio Díaz (ESP)	12th / Tina Lutz (GER)	
2005	Tina Lutz (GER)	Matthew Schoener Scott (TRI)	Wu Jianan (CHN)	1st / Tina Lutz (GER)	
2006	Julian Autenrieth (GER)	Griselda Khng (SIN)	Édgar Diminich (ECU)	2nd / Griselda Khng (SIN)	
2007	Chris Steele (NZL)	Benjamín Grez (CHI)	Alex Maloney (NZL)	3rd / Alex Maloney (NZL)	
2008	Raúl Ríos (PUR)	Ian Barrows (ISV)	Kristien Kirketerp (DEN)	5th / Tomoyo Wakabayashi (JPN)	
2009	Sinclair Jones (PER)	Faizal Norizan (MAS)	Ignacio Rogala (ARG)	4th / Noppakao Poonpat (THA)	
2010	Noppakao Poonpat (THA)	Ahmad Syukri Abdul Aziz (MAS)	Keiju Okada (JPN)	1st / Noppakao Poonpat (THA)	
2011	Kimberly Lim (SGP)	Bart Lambriex (NED)	Javier Arribas (PER)	1st / Kimberly Lim (SGP)	
2012	Elisa Yukie Yokoyama (SGP)	Samuel Neo (SGP)	Jessica Goh (SGP)	1st / Elisa Yukie Yokoyama (SGP)	
2013	Loh Jia Yi (SGP)	Nils Sternbeck (GER)	Edward Tan (SGP)	4th / Bertha Han (SGP)	
2014	Nicolas Rolaz (SUI)	Voravong Rachrattanaruk (THA)	Dimitris Papadimitriou (GRE)	4th / Aina Colom (ESP)	
2015	Rok Verderber (SLO)	Jodie Lai (SIN)	Mathias Berthet (NOR)	2nd / Jodie Lai (SIN)	
2016	Max Wallenberg (SUI)	Mathias Berthet (NOR)	Fauzi Kaman Shah (MAS)	Victoria Schultheis (MLT)	
2017	Marco Gradoni (ITA)	Fauzi Kaman Shah (MAS)	Mic Sig Kos Mohr (CRC)	23rd / María Perelló (ESP)	
2018	Marco Gradoni (ITA)	Stephan Baker (USA)	Panwa Boonnak (THA)	14th / María Perelló (ESP)	
2019	Marco Gradoni (ITA)	Richard Schultheis (MLT)	Jaime Ayarza (ESP)	25th / María Perelló (ESP)	
2020	Cancelled due to the COVID-19 pandemic				
2021	Alex Di Francesco Kuhl (BRA)	Gil Hackel (USA)	Alex Demurtas (ITA)	7th / Lomane Valade (FRA)	
2022	Weka Bhanubandh (THA)	James Pine (USA)	Francesco Carrieri (ITA)	24th / Medine Havva Tatlıcan (TUR)	
2023	Henric Wigforss (SWE)	Travis Greenberg (USA)	Wylder Smith (USA)	26th / Blanca Ferrando (ESP)	
2024	Iason Panagopoulos (GRE)	Arthur Back (BRA)	Mateo Carbonell (ESP)	11th / Marta Mansito (ESP)	
2025	Nikolaos Pappas (GRE)	Mihael Zobec (SLO)	Carl Birgersson (DEN)	5th / Olha Lubianska (UKR)	
2026	Manuel Bragança (BRA)	Elliot Novara (SUI)	Andrei Zhakov (MLT)	6th / Inés Méndez Larminaux (PUR)	

=== Medalists Team Racing ===
Year	Gold	Silver	Bronze
1983	France		
1984	Denmark		
1985	Sweden		
1986	France		
1987	Spain		
1988	Spain		
1989	Denmark		
1990	Argentina		
1991	Brazil		
1992	Italy		
1993	Argentina		
1994	Argentina		
1995	Spain		
1996	Argentina		
1997	Peru		
1998	Peru		
1999	Peru		
2000	Argentina	Brazil	Croatia
2001	Argentina		
2002	Argentina		
2003	Argentina		
2004	Poland		
2005	Argentina		
2006	Singapore		
2007	Greece		
2008	Puerto Rico		
2009	China		
2010	Thailand		
2011	Singapore		
2012	Singapore	United States	Netherlands
2013	Singapore		
2014	Thailand		
2015	Singapore		
2016	United States	Germany	Singapore
2017	United States		
2018	Thailand		
2019	Italy		
2020	Cancelled COVID		
2021	Italy		
2022	United States		
2023	Italy		
2024	Spain	Singapore	Puerto Rico
2025	Spain	Singapore	United States
2026	Spain	Turkey	Argentina
