= IODA (disambiguation) =

IODA is an abbreviation that may refer to:

- Independent Online Distribution Alliance, a digital distribution company
- International Optimist Dinghy Association, see Optimist (dinghy)
