= El Toro (dinghy) =

Sailboat class

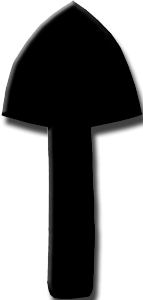

Development
- Designer: Charles McGregor
- Location: United States
- Year: 1939
- No. built: 11,000
- Builders: Moore Sailboats; W. D. Schock Corp; James Ayres
- Role: One-design racer
- Name: El Toro

Boat
- Crew: One
- Displacement: 80 lb (36 kg)
- Draft: 1.50 ft (0.46 m) with daggerboard down

Hull
- Type: monohull
- Construction: wood or fiberglass
- LOA: 7.92 ft (2.41 m)
- Beam: 3.93 ft (1.20 m)

Hull appendages
- Keel: daggerboard
- Rudder: transom-mounted rudder

Rig
- Rig type: Bermuda rig

Sails
- Sailplan: catboat
- Mainsail area: 49.00 sq ft (4.552 m^{2})
- Total sail area: 49.00 sq ft (4.552 m^{2})

The El Toro is an American pram sailboat that was designed by Charles McGregor as a sail training dinghy and yacht tender, first built in 1939. It is now often sailed as a singlehanded one-design racer.

The boat is a development of McGregor's Sabot design, the plans for which were published in The Rudder magazine in 1939. The design has been widely adapted and other derivations include the Naples Sabot, US Sabot, Wind'ard Sabot and the Australian Holdfast Trainer.

== Production ==
The design was built by Moore Sailboats, W. D. Schock Corp and James Ayres (600+ hulls) in the United States, but it is now out of production. More than 11.000 boats were produced.

== Design ==
The El Toro is a recreational sailing dinghy, with the early versions build of plywood and later ones of fiberglass, with wood trim. Spars may be made from wood, aluminum or carbon fiber. It has a cat rig, a squared stem, a nearly plumb transom, a transom-hung rudder controlled by a tiller and a retractable daggerboard. Ready to sail it displaces 80 lb (36 kg), with the hull alone weighing 60 lb (27 kg).

The boat has a draft of 18 in (46 cm) with the daggerboard extended and 6 in (15 cm) with it retracted, allowing operation in shallow water or beaching. It can also be transported on a trailer or automobile roof.

The design has a hull speed of 3.8 kn (7.0 km/h).

== Operational history ==
The boat is mostly sailed on the American west coast and is supported by an active class club that organizes racing events, the El Toro International Yacht Racing Association.

The class has competed in the annual BullShip Race in Sausalito, California, since 1954. The start line is at the Horizons Restaurant dock and the course runs to San Francisco, past Alcatraz Island and the Golden Gate Bridge, finishing at the end of the breakwater at the Golden Gate Yacht Club and St. Francis Yacht Club. Due to the distance, currents and other challenges for these small boats the race is referred to as The El Toro TransPac, a comparison to the Transpacific Yacht Race.

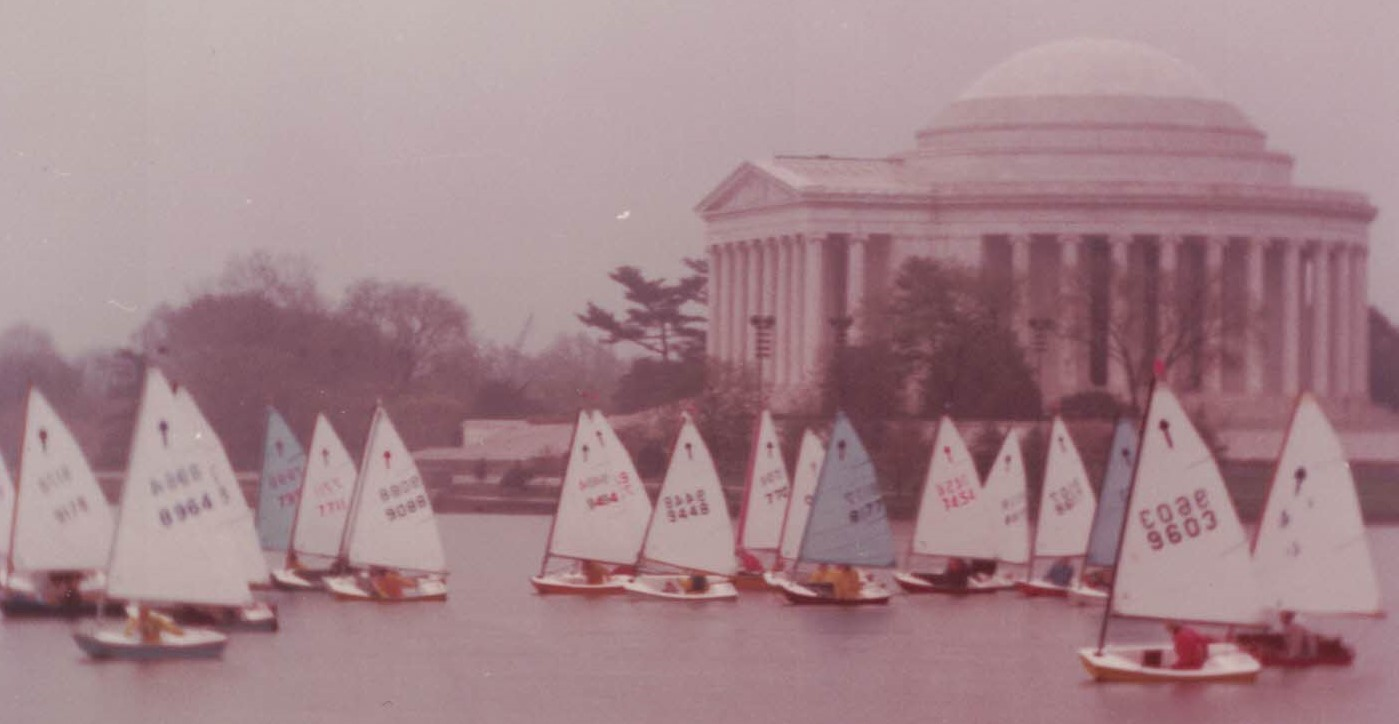
El Toro dinghies competing in the Cherry Blossom Regatta in the Tidal Basin

For many years, the El Toro International Yacht Racing Association had the distinction of hosting the Cherry Blossom Regatta in the Washington D.C. Tidal Basin. The annual regatta was first held in 1973 and featured the El Toro dinghy.

In a 2015 reviewer T. Sitzmann in Sail 1 Design wrote of the El Toro, that they "are satisfactory tenders and sprightly racers. Junior sailing programs at yacht clubs and municipal sailing classes have developed many fine young El Toro captains. High quality racing programs have kept the interest of these young sailors. Often sailors 'move up' to larger yachts and are frequently recognized as champions. Many return to the lively tactical sailing situations provided by El Toro racing."

== See also ==
- List of sailing boat types

Related development

- Holdfast Trainer
- Naples Sabot
- Sabot (dinghy)
- US Sabot

Similar sailboats

- Optimist (dinghy)
