= Sailing at the 1996 Summer Olympics – Europe =

Sailing at the Olympics

Europe at the Games of the XXVI Olympiad
- Europe
- Venue: Savannah
- Dates: 22 July to 2 August
- Competitors: 28 from 28 nations
- Teams: 28

Medalists
1st place, gold medalist(s)		Kristine Roug	Denmark
2nd place, silver medalist(s)		Margriet Matthijsse	Netherlands
3rd place, bronze medalist(s)		Courtenay Becker-Dey	United States

The Women's Europe Competition was a sailing event on the program at the 1996 Summer Olympics that was held from 22 July to 2 August 1996 in Savannah, Georgia, United States. Points were awarded for placement in each race. Eleven races were scheduled and sailed. Each sailor had two discards.

== Results ==
Courtenay Becker-Dey placed third and earned the United States its first-ever Olympic medal in sailing. After the race, she said, "This is always what I've wanted and I made it happen."

Rank	Helmsman (Country)	Race I		Race II		Race III		Race IV		Race V		Race VI		Race VII		Race VIII		Race IX		Race X		Race XI		Total Points	Total -1
Rank	Helmsman (Country)	Rank	Points	Rank	Points	Rank	Points	Rank	Points	Rank	Points	Rank	Points	Rank	Points	Rank	Points	Rank	Points	Rank	Points	Rank	Points	Total Points	Total -1
1st place, gold medalist(s)	Kristine Roug (DEN)	2	2.0	1	1.0	3	3.0	2	2.0	1	1.0	2	2.0	~~8~~	~~8.0~~	1	1.0	~~8~~	~~8.0~~	7	7.0	5	5.0	40.0	24.0
2nd place, silver medalist(s)	Margriet Matthijsse (NED)	~~PMS~~	~~29.0~~	2	2.0	1	1.0	10	10.0	2	2.0	1	1.0	1	1.0	4	4.0	~~12~~	~~12.0~~	5	5.0	4	4.0	71.0	30.0
3rd place, bronze medalist(s)	Courtenay Becker-Dey (USA)	1	1.0	8	8.0	2	2.0	4	4.0	7	7.0	6	6.0	3	3.0	~~14~~	~~14.0~~	~~9~~	~~9.0~~	2	2.0	6	6.0	62.0	39.0
4	Shirley Robertson (GBR)	3	3.0	7	7.0	~~18~~	~~18.0~~	1	1.0	6	6.0	3	3.0	~~22~~	~~22.0~~	2	2.0	4	4.0	12	12.0	3	3.0	81.0	41.0
5	Sharon Ferris (NZL)	7	7.0	16	16.0	5	5.0	5	5.0	11	11.0	~~18~~	~~18.0~~	19	19.0	3	3.0	2	2.0	6	6.0	~~18~~	~~18.0~~	110.0	73.0
6	Sibylle Powarzynski (GER)	18	18.0	3	3.0	4	4.0	7	7.0	10	10.0	10	10.0	~~25~~	~~25.0~~	18	18.0	~~21~~	~~21.0~~	4	4.0	1	1.0	121.0	75.0
7	Linda Konttorp (NOR)	9	9.0	4	4.0	15	15.0	~~20~~	~~20.0~~	3	3.0	19	19.0	12	12.0	~~21~~	~~21.0~~	16	16.0	1	1.0	2	2.0	122.0	81.0
8	Serena Amato (ARG)	8	8.0	~~17~~	~~17.0~~	8	8.0	8	8.0	~~16~~	~~16.0~~	15	15.0	6	6.0	5	5.0	1	1.0	16	16.0	14	14.0	114.0	81.0
9	Malin Millbourn (SWE)	5	5.0	~~19~~	~~19.0~~	13	13.0	13	13.0	14	14.0	4	4.0	10	10.0	9	9.0	3	3.0	11	11.0	~~16~~	~~16.0~~	117.0	82.0
10	Aisling Bowman (IRL)	10	10.0	6	6.0	14	14.0	6	6.0	5	5.0	7	7.0	~~21~~	~~21.0~~	15	15.0	10	10.0	~~20~~	~~20.0~~	9	9.0	123.0	82.0
11	Christine Bridge (AUS)	~~16~~	~~16.0~~	10	10.0	~~22~~	~~22.0~~	12	12.0	4	4.0	5	5.0	13	13.0	6	6.0	15	15.0	10	10.0	11	11.0	124.0	86.0
12	Arianna Bogatec (ITA)	15	15.0	14	14.0	7	7.0	9	9.0	8	8.0	12	12.0	2	2.0	~~17~~	~~17.0~~	~~20~~	~~20.0~~	9	9.0	17	17.0	130.0	93.0
13	Tine Moberg-Parker (CAN)	4	4.0	15	15.0	9	9.0	3	3.0	12	12.0	~~DSQ~~	~~29.0~~	17	17.0	19	19.0	~~22~~	~~22.0~~	8	8.0	7	7.0	145.0	94.0
14	Paula Lewin (BER)	~~20~~	~~20.0~~	9	9.0	6	6.0	15	15.0	15	15.0	14	14.0	14	14.0	8	8.0	5	5.0	~~17~~	~~17.0~~	8	8.0	131.0	94.0
15	Nicole Meylan-Levecque (SUI)	14	14.0	5	5.0	21	21.0	11	11.0	13	13.0	11	11.0	9	9.0	~~25~~	~~25.0~~	~~DNF~~	~~29.0~~	3	3.0	13	13.0	154.0	100.0
16	Márcia Pellicano (BRA)	~~19~~	~~19.0~~	~~20~~	~~20.0~~	17	17.0	16	16.0	9	9.0	8	8.0	7	7.0	16	16.0	11	11.0	13	13.0	10	10.0	146.0	107.0
17	Helen Montilla (ESP)	6	6.0	18	18.0	12	12.0	17	17.0	~~21~~	~~21.0~~	~~PMS~~	~~29.0~~	4	4.0	7	7.0	7	7.0	19	19.0	21	21.0	161.0	111.0
18	Vesna Dekleva (SLO)	17	17.0	~~21~~	~~21.0~~	11	11.0	~~21~~	~~21.0~~	17	17.0	21	21.0	5	5.0	10	10.0	6	6.0	15	15.0	12	12.0	156.0	114.0
19	Chita Smedberg (FIN)	12	12.0	13	13.0	10	10.0	14	14.0	19	19.0	9	9.0	15	15.0	~~22~~	~~22.0~~	18	18.0	18	18.0	~~23~~	~~23.0~~	173.0	128.0
20	Weronika Gunkiewicz (POL)	11	11.0	11	11.0	16	16.0	~~DNF~~	~~29.0~~	~~20~~	~~20.0~~	24	24.0	20	20.0	13	13.0	14	14.0	14	14.0	19	19.0	191.0	138.0
21	Ingrid Bellemans (BEL)	~~21~~	~~21.0~~	12	12.0	19	19.0	19	19.0	18	18.0	17	17.0	18	18.0	12	12.0	13	13.0	~~27~~	~~27.0~~	20	20.0	196.0	148.0
22	Maria Mylona (GRE)	13	13.0	22	22.0	20	20.0	22	22.0	~~24~~	~~24.0~~	13	13.0	11	11.0	11	11.0	19	19.0	21	21.0	~~24~~	~~24.0~~	200.0	152.0
23	Aiko Saito (JPN)	23	23.0	23	23.0	25	25.0	24	24.0	22	22.0	16	16.0	~~26~~	~~26.0~~	20	20.0	~~26~~	~~26.0~~	23	23.0	15	15.0	243.0	191.0
24	Krista Kruuv (EST)	22	22.0	~~25~~	~~25.0~~	26	26.0	23	23.0	23	23.0	20	20.0	23	23.0	~~26~~	~~26.0~~	17	17.0	22	22.0	22	22.0	249.0	197.0
25	Joana Pratas (POR)	25	25.0	24	24.0	23	23.0	~~27~~	~~27.0~~	25	25.0	23	23.0	16	16.0	24	24.0	24	24.0	25	25.0	~~26~~	~~26.0~~	262.0	209.0
26	Anastasiya Podobed (BLR)	24	24.0	~~26~~	~~26.0~~	24	24.0	26	26.0	~~27~~	~~27.0~~	26	26.0	24	24.0	23	23.0	23	23.0	24	24.0	25	25.0	272.0	219.0
27	Tracey Tan (SIN)	26	26.0	~~27~~	~~27.0~~	27	27.0	18	18.0	26	26.0	22	22.0	~~27~~	~~27.0~~	27	27.0	25	25.0	26	26.0	27	27.0	278.0	224.0
28	Roberta Lepper (FIJ)	27	27.0	~~28~~	~~28.0~~	28	28.0	25	25.0	28	28.0	25	25.0	28	28.0	28	28.0	27	27.0	28	28.0	~~DNC~~	~~29.0~~	301.0	244.0

=== Daily standings ===
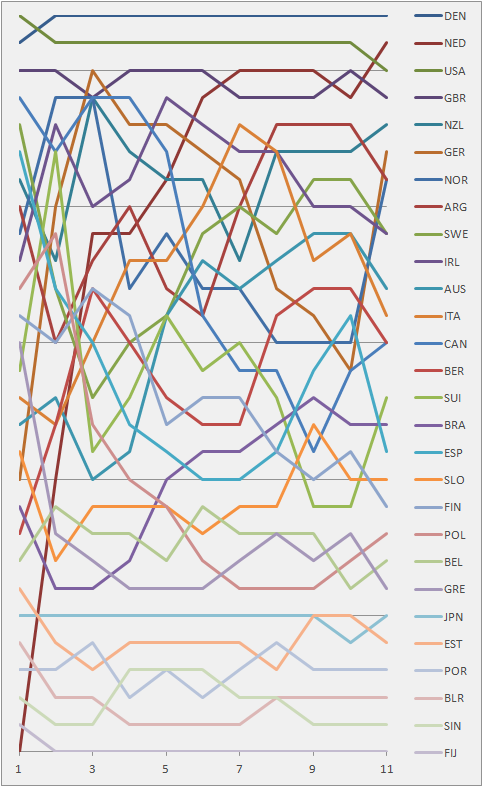
Graph showing the daily standings in the Europe during the 1996 Summer Olympics

== Conditions at the Europe course areas ==
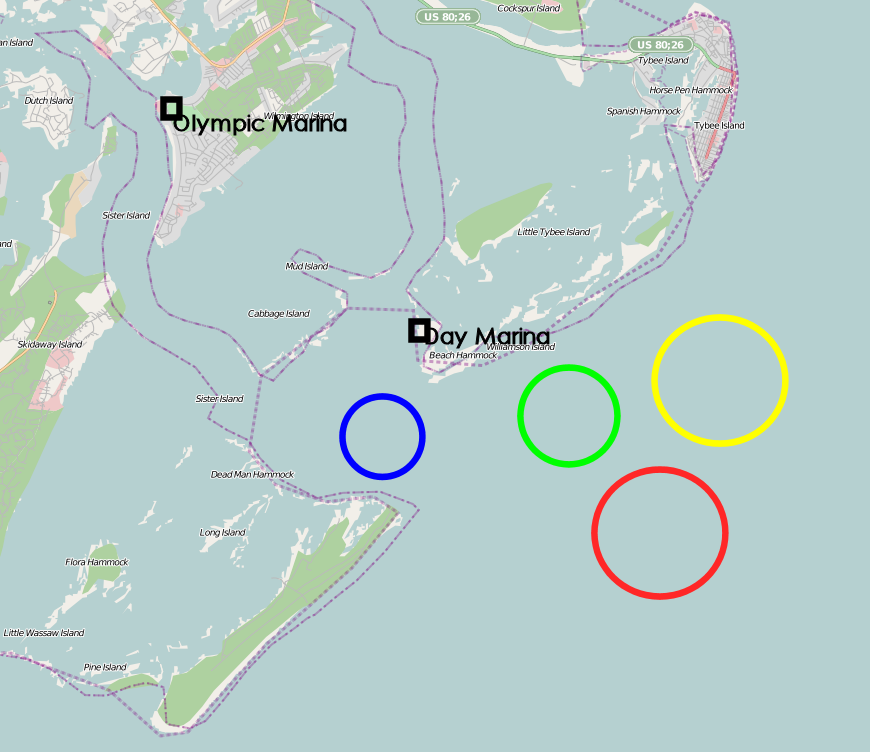
Black: Marinas
Blue: Alpha course
Green: Bravo course
Yellow: Charly course
Red: Delta course

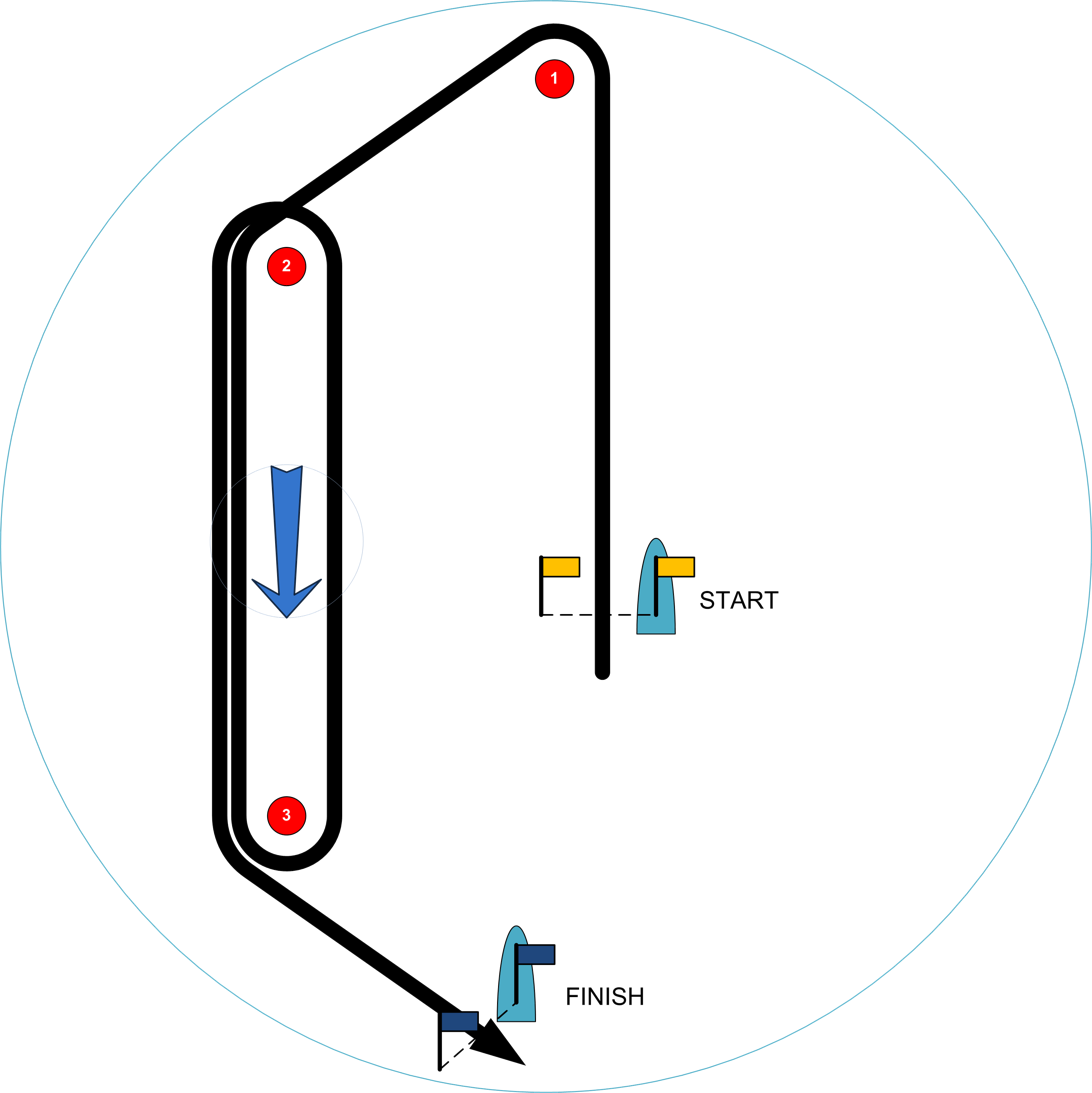
Olympic course ZO.
S(Start) - 1 - 2 - 3 - 2 - 3 - F(Finish reaching)

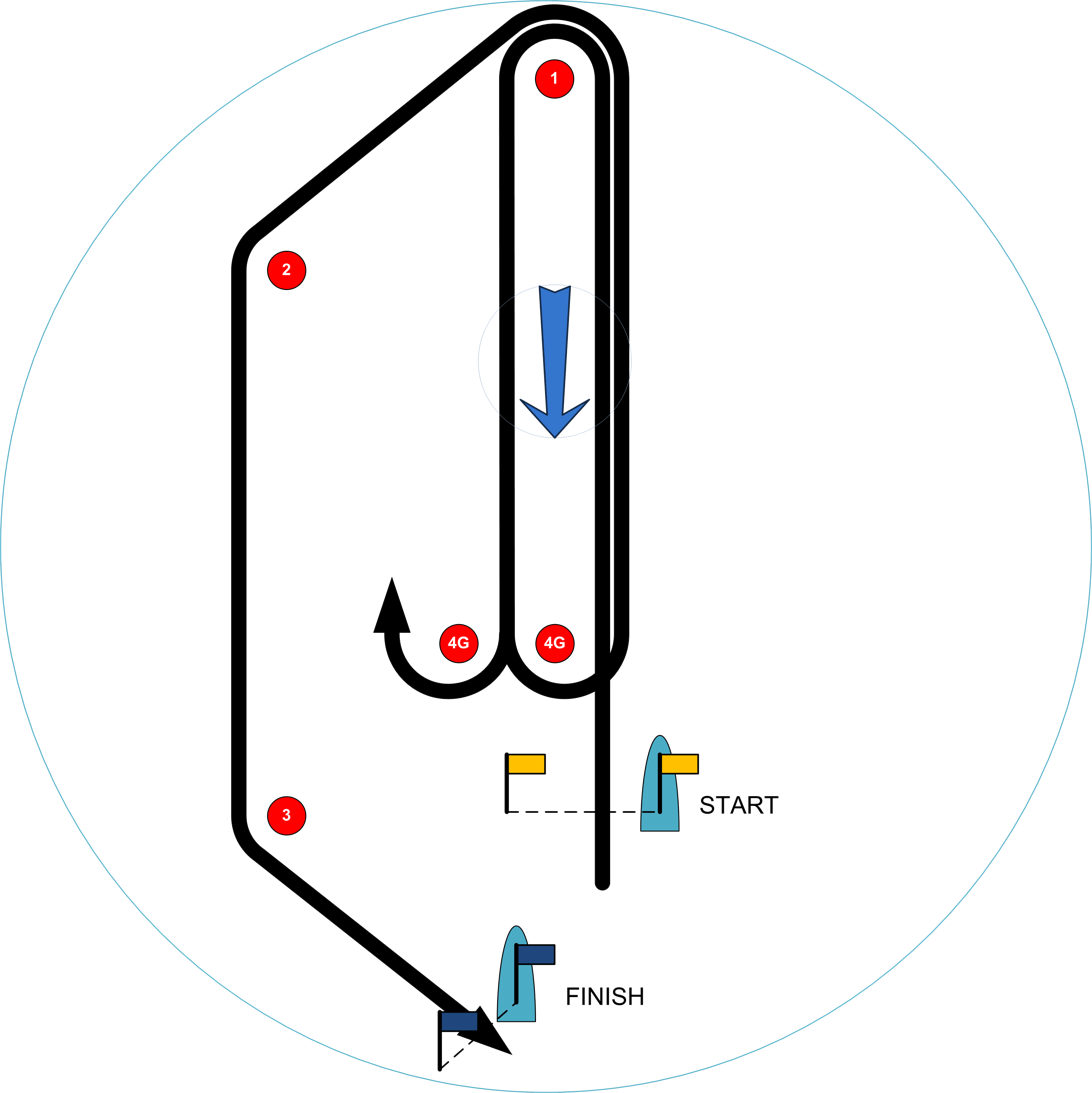
Olympic course ZI.
S(Start) - 1 - 4G - 1 - 2 - 3 - F(Finish reaching)

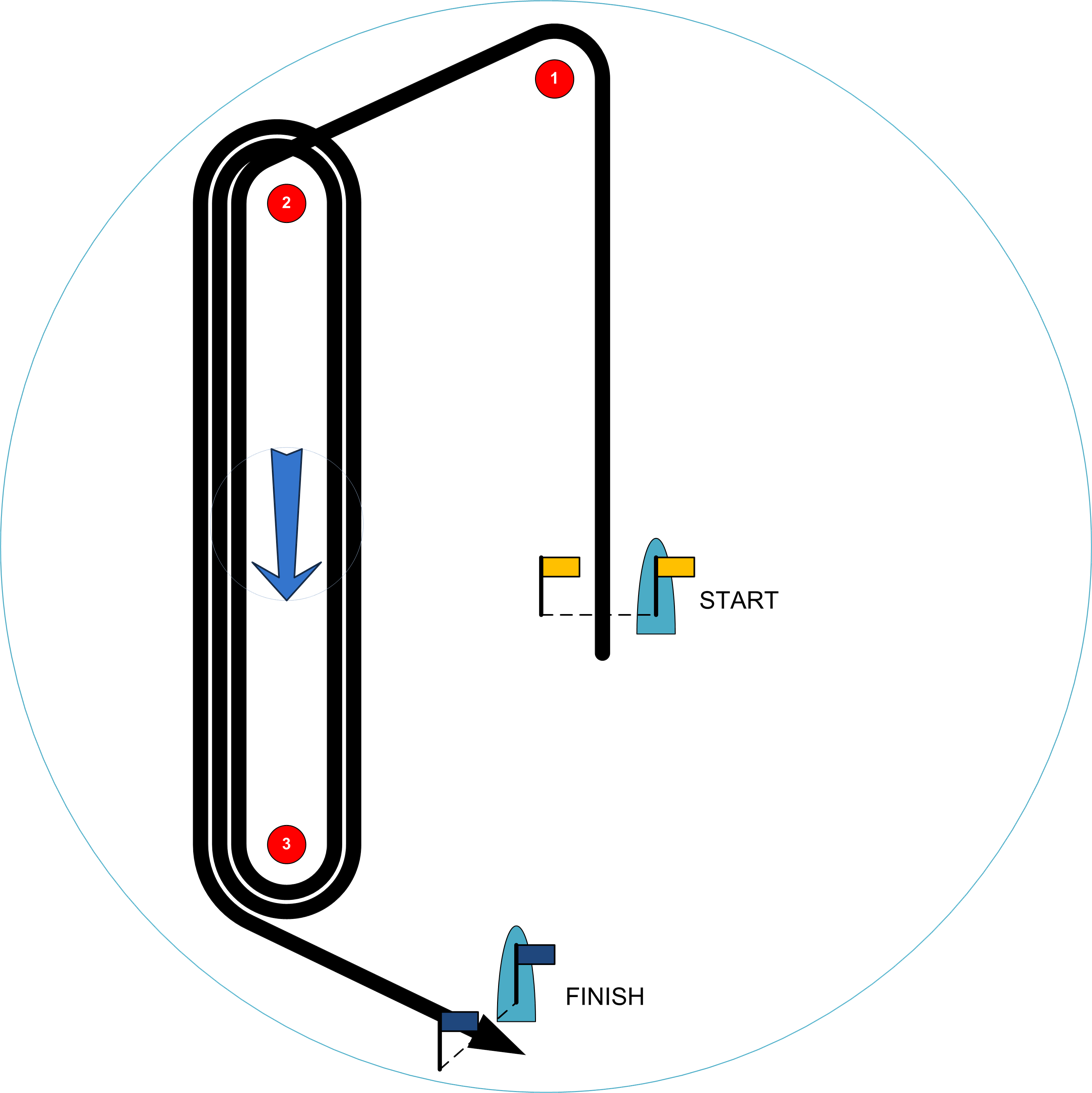
Olympic course XO.
S(Start) - 1 - 2 - 3 - 2 - 3 - 2 - 3 - F(Finish reaching)

Date	Race	Celsius	Knot	Meter	Course	Course area
23 July 1996	I	29	10	0.8		Bravo
23 July 1996	II	29	13	0.8		Bravo
24 July 1996	III	28	11	0.7		Bravo
24 July 1996	IV	29	14	0.8		Bravo
25 July 1996	V	29	13	0.7	ZO	Bravo
25 July 1996	VI	29	19	0.1	ZO	Bravo
26 July 1996	VII	27	7	0.5	ZI	Bravo
26 July 1996	VIII	27	10	0.5	ZO	Bravo
29 July 1996	IX	28	11	0.6	XO	Bravo
29 July 1996	X	28	11	0.4	XO	Bravo
31 July 1996	XI	28	15	0.5	ZI	Bravo
