= Sailing at the 1992 Summer Olympics – Europe =

Sailing at the Olympics

Europe at the Games of the XXV Olympiad
- Europe
- Venue: Barcelona
- Dates: 27 July to 4 August
- Competitors: 24 from 24 nations
- Teams: 24

Medalists
1st place, gold medalist(s)		Linda Andersen	Norway
2nd place, silver medalist(s)		Natalia Vía Dufresne	Spain
3rd place, bronze medalist(s)		Julia Trotman	United States

The Women's Europe Competition at the 1992 Summer Olympics was held from 27 July to 4 August 1992 in Barcelona, Spain. Seven races were scheduled. 24 sailors, on 24 boats, from 24 nations competed.

== Results ==
Rank	Helmsman (Country)	Race I		Race II		Race III		Race IV		Race V		Race VI		Race VII		Total Points	Total -1
Rank	Helmsman (Country)	Rank	Points	Rank	Points	Rank	Points	Rank	Points	Rank	Points	Rank	Points	Rank	Points	Total Points	Total -1
1	Linda Andersen (NOR)	9	15.0	12	18.0	1	0.0	1	0.0	3	5.7	~~PMS~~	~~31.0~~	5	10.0	79.7	48.7
2	Natalia Vía Dufresne (ESP)	~~8~~	~~14.0~~	3	5.7	6	11.7	2	3.0	7	13.0	5	10.0	8	14.0	71.4	57.4
3	Julia Trotman (USA)	1	0.0	2	3.0	~~PMS~~	~~31.0~~	3	5.7	4	8.0	PMS	31.0	9	15.0	93.7	62.7
4	Jenny Armstrong (NZL)	11	17.0	5	10.0	2	3.0	8	14.0	~~20~~	~~26.0~~	12	18.0	2	3.0	91.0	65.0
5	Dorte Jensen (DEN)	10	16.0	1	0.0	5	10.0	5	10.0	~~12~~	~~18.0~~	14	20.0	6	11.7	85.7	65.7
6	Krista Kruuv (EST)	3	5.7	8	14.0	3	5.7	9	15.0	9	15.0	6	11.7	~~16~~	~~22.0~~	89.1	67.1
7	Martine van Leeuwen (NED)	~~21~~	~~27.0~~	4	8.0	11	17.0	6	11.7	11	17.0	8	14.0	1	0.0	94.7	67.7
8	Arianna Bogatec (ITA)	12	18.0	11	17.0	~~13~~	~~19.0~~	4	8.0	5	10.0	2	3.0	7	13.0	88.0	69.0
9	Shirley Robertson (GBR)	4	8.0	6	11.7	10	16.0	~~16~~	~~22.0~~	8	14.0	4	8.0	10	16.0	95.7	73.7
10	Chita Smedberg (FIN)	5	10.0	22	28.0	7	13.0	19	25.0	2	3.0	1	0.0	~~24~~	~~30.0~~	109.0	79.0
11	Helena Brodin (SWE)	6	11.7	~~20~~	~~26.0~~	12	18.0	11	17.0	1	0.0	7	13.0	15	21.0	106.7	80.7
12	Denise Lyttle (IRL)	2	3.0	15	21.0	~~PMS~~	~~31.0~~	12	18.0	6	11.7	3	5.7	19	25.0	115.4	84.4
13	Annabel Chaulvin (FRA)	~~17~~	~~23.0~~	13	19.0	16	22.0	10	16.0	17	23.0	9	15.0	3	5.7	123.7	100.7
14	Márcia Pellicano (BRA)	7	13.0	9	15.0	14	20.0	13	19.0	~~21~~	~~27.0~~	11	17.0	13	19.0	130.0	103.0
15	Shona Moss (CAN)	~~22~~	~~28.0~~	16	22.0	8	14.0	7	13.0	13	19.0	13	19.0	17	23.0	138.0	110.0
16	Nicole Meylan-Levecque (SUI)	15	21.0	17	23.0	~~PMS~~	~~31.0~~	15	21.0	14	20.0	15	21.0	4	8.0	145.0	114.0
17	Gisela Williams (ARG)	14	20.0	7	13.0	~~19~~	~~25.0~~	17	23.0	23	29.0	10	16.0	11	17.0	143.0	114.0
18	Min Dezillie (BEL)	18	24.0	14	20.0	4	8.0	18	24.0	15	21.0	~~DSQ~~	~~31.0~~	12	18.0	146.0	115.0
19	Krisztina Bácsics (HUN)	13	19.0	21	27.0	9	15.0	~~22~~	~~28.0~~	10	16.0	16	22.0	21	27.0	154.0	126.0
20	Christine Bridge (AUS)	~~20~~	~~26.0~~	10	16.0	17	23.0	14	20.0	18	24.0	19	25.0	18	24.0	158.0	132.0
21	Paula Lewin (BER)	16	22.0	19	25.0	15	21.0	~~20~~	~~26.0~~	16	22.0	17	23.0	20	26.0	165.0	139.0
22	Zhang Shunfang (CHN)	~~23~~	~~29.0~~	18	24.0	20	26.0	21	27.0	19	25.0	18	24.0	14	20.0	175.0	146.0
23	Karen Portch (ANT)	19	25.0	~~24~~	~~30.0~~	18	24.0	23	29.0	22	28.0	20	26.0	22	28.0	190.0	160.0
24	Marissa Maurin (CHI)	24	30.0	23	29.0	21	27.0	~~DSQ~~	~~31.0~~	24	30.0	21	27.0	23	29.0	203.0	172.0

=== Daily standings ===
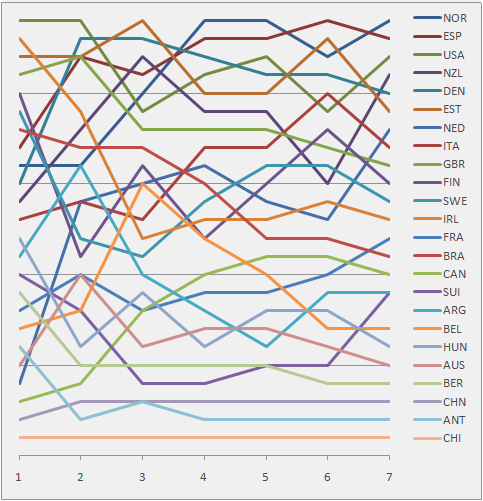
Graph showing the daily standings in the Europe during the 1992 Summer Olympics
