= Brodin =

Brodin is a surname. Notable people with the surname include:

- Ben Brodin, musician from Omaha, Nebraska
- Camilla Brodin (born 1979), Swedish politician
- Claude Brodin (1934–2014), French Olympic fencer
- Daniel Brodin (born 1990), Swedish ice hockey player
- Elin Brodin (born 1963), Norwegian novelist
- Emilia Brodin (born 1990), Swedish footballer
- Gösta Brodin (1908–1979), Swedish sailor, competed in the 1948 Summer Olympics
- Helena Brodin (born 1936), Swedish actress
- Helena Brodin (sailor) (born 1970), Swedish sailor
- Jacques Brodin (born 1946), French fencer
- Jesper Brodin (born 1968), Swedish business leader, CEO of Ingka Group
- Jonas Brodin (born 1993), Swedish ice hockey player
- Norbert Brodin (1896–1970), American film cinematographer
