= Roberta Lepper =

Fijian sailor

Personal information
- Born: 11 September 1978 (age 48) Labasa, Fiji
- Height: 172 cm (5 ft 8 in)
- Weight: 73 kg (161 lb; 11 st 7 lb)

Sport
- Sport: Sailing

Roberta Lepper (born 11 September 1978) is a Fijian sailor. She competed in the Europe event at the 1996 Summer Olympics.
