= Krisztina Bácsics =

Hungarian sailor (born 1973)

Personal information
- Nationality: Hungarian
- Born: 22 November 1973 (age 51) Keszthely, Hungary
- Height: 170 cm (5 ft 7 in)
- Weight: 61 kg (134 lb; 9 st 8 lb)

Sport
- Sport: Sailing

Krisztina Bácsics (born 22 November 1973) is a Hungarian sailor. She competed in the Europe event at the 1992 Summer Olympics.
