= Joana Pratas =

Portuguese sailor

Personal information
- Full name: Joana Santos Silva Ferreira Pratas
- Nationality: Portugal
- Born: 28 November 1978 (age 47) Lisbon, Portugal
- Height: 1.68 m (5 ft 6 in)
- Weight: 57 kg (126 lb)

Sailing career
- Sport: Sailing
- Club: Clube Internacional da Marina de Vilamoura
- Class: Dinghy

Joana Santos Silva Ferreira Pratas (born 28 November 1978) is a Portuguese former sailor, who specialized in the Europe class. She was selected to compete for Portugal in three editions of the Olympic Games (1996, 2000, and 2004), posting scores lower than the top twenty, respectively, in all of her career meets.

Pratas made her Olympic debut, as a seventeen-year-old teen and one of the first Portuguese women to compete in sailing, in Atlanta 1996, finishing twenty-fifth overall in the Europe class with a satisfying net grade of 209.

At the 2000 Summer Olympics in Sydney, Pratas accumulated a net score of 141 points at the end of eleven-race series to pick up the twenty-first overall spot in the Europe regatta, due to the expense of her superb top-ten feat on the opening leg.

Eight years after competing in her first Games, Pratas qualified for her third Portuguese team, as a 31-year-old, in the Europe class at the 2004 Summer Olympics in Athens, by placing among the top 40 and receiving a berth from the 2003 ISAF World Championships in Cádiz, Spain. Pratas started the race series comfortably with a magnificent runner-up finish to Norwegian sailor and eventual champion Siren Sundby, but an unexpectedly disastrous feat on the succeeding legs of the regatta saw Pratas tumble down the leaderboard, leaving her farther from the field in twenty-second overall position with 169 net points.
