= Christine Bridge =

Australian sailor

Personal information
- Full name: Christine Linda Bridge
- Born: 31 October 1961 (age 64) Melbourne, Victoria, Australia
- Height: 167 cm (5 ft 6 in)
- Weight: 66 kg (146 lb)

Sailing career
- Country: Australia
- Sport: Sailing
- Club: Royal Queensland Yacht Squadron

Christine Linda Bridge (born 31 October 1961) is an Australian sailor who represented Australia at the 1992 Barcelona Olympics and the 1996 Atlanta Olympics.

Bridge competed in the 1992 Europe dinghy event and finished in 20th place. Four years later in Atlanta she finished eleventh in the 1996 Europe dinghy event. Her best performances in the heats were a fourth, fifth and sixth place.
