= Zhang Shunfang =

Chinese sailor (born 1966)

Personal information
- Native name: 張 順芳
- Nationality: Chinese
- Born: 16 June 1966 (age 59)
- Height: 170 cm (5 ft 7 in)
- Weight: 73 kg (161 lb; 11 st 7 lb)

Sport
- Sport: Sailing

Zhang Shunfang (born 16 June 1966) is a Chinese sailor. She competed in the Europe event at the 1992 Summer Olympics.
