= Anastasiya Podobed =

Belarusian sailor

Personal information
- Nationality: Belarusian
- Born: 27 August 1973 (age 51)

Sport
- Sport: Sailing

Anastasiya Podobed (born 27 August 1973) is a Belarusian sailor. She competed in the Europe event at the 1996 Summer Olympics.
