= Ingrid Bellemans =

Belgian sailor (born 1967)

Personal information
- Nationality: Belgian
- Born: 19 February 1967 (age 58); Vilvoorde, Belgium

Sport
- Sport: Sailing

Ingrid Bellemans (born 19 February 1967) is a Belgian former sailor. She competed in the Europe event at the 1996 Summer Olympics.
