= Karen Portch =

Antiguan and Barbudan sailor

Personal information
- Birth name: Karen Lynn Portch
- Nationality: Antiguan and Barbudan
- Born: 5 June 1959 (age 65)

Sport
- Sport: Sailing

Karen Lynn Portch (born 5 June 1959) is an Antiguan and Barbudan sailor. She competed in the Europe event at the 1992 Summer Olympics.
