= Linda Konttorp =

Norwegian sailor

Personal information
- Nationality: Norwegian
- Born: 31 March 1974 (age 50); Åsgårdstrand, Norway

Sport
- Sport: Sailing
- Club: Tønsberg Yacht Club

Linda Konttorp (born 31 March 1974) is a former Norwegian sailor. She was born in Åsgårdstrand, and represented the Tønsberg Yacht Club. She competed at the 1996 Summer Olympics in Atlanta, where she placed seventh in the Europe class.
