= Gisela Williams =

Argentine sailor

Personal information
- Birth name: Gisela Williams Camet Bekker
- Nationality: Argentine
- Born: 15 March 1972 (age 53)

Sport
- Sport: Sailing

Gisela Williams Camet Bekker (born 15 March 1972) is an Argentine sailor. She competed in the Europe event at the 1992 Summer Olympics.
