= Marissa Maurin =

Chilean sailor

Personal information
- Birth name: Marissa Maurin Gausset
- Nationality: Chilean
- Born: 10 December 1966 (age 58)

Sport
- Sport: Sailing

Marissa Maurin Gausset (born 10 December 1966) is a Chilean sailor. She competed in the Europe event at the 1992 Summer Olympics.
