= Marco Gradoni =

Italian sailor

Personal information
- Born: March 24, 2004 (age 22) Rome, Italy

Sailing career
- Sport: Sailing
- Classes: 470, Optimist
Medal record
Sailing
Representing Italy
Optimist World Championship
Gold medal – first place	2017 Pattaya	Optimist
Gold medal – first place	2018 Limassol	Optimist
Gold medal – first place	2019 Antigua	Optimist
470 Junior World Championships
Gold medal – first place	2019 San Remo	470 Juniors World Championships
European Championships
Gold medal – first place	2019 Formia	470 Juniors

Marco Gradoni is an Italian sailor. He became the first Optimist sailor in history to win three successive World Championship titles (2017, 2018 and 2019). In doing so, Gradoni was awarded the Rolex World Sailor of The Year Award in 2019, being the youngest ever recipient.

As of June 2024, Gradoni is a helmsman for Luna Rossa Prada Pirelli.

He won the 2021 mixed 470 Junior World Championships held in Sanremo.

In June 2023, Gradoni announced that he would pause his Olympic 470 campaign whilst he focused on the upcoming 2024 America's Cup for Luna Rossa Prada Pirelli.
