= Martine van Leeuwen =

Dutch sailor (born 1968)

Personal information
- Full name: Martine Christine van Leeuwen
- Nationality: Dutch
- Born: 16 July 1968 (age 57) Rotterdam
- Height: 1.63 m (5.3 ft)

Sailing career
- Sport: Sailing
- Class: Europe
- Updated on 19 February 2014

Martine Christine van Leeuwen (born 16 July 1968 in Rotterdam) is a sailor from the Netherlands, who represented her country at the 1992 Summer Olympics in Barcelona in the Europe event. Van Leeuwen took the 7th place.
