= US Sabot =

Sailboat class

Development
- Designer: Charles McGregor
- Location: United States
- Year: 1939
- Builders: W. D. Schock Corp; Catalina Yachts
- Role: One-design racing Sailing dinghy

Boat
- Crew: One
- Displacement: 68 lb (31 kg)
- Draft: 1.30 ft (0.40 m) with daggerboard down

Hull
- Type: monohull
- Construction: Plywood or fiberglass
- LOA: 8.00 ft (2.44 m)
- Beam: 3.83 ft (1.17 m)

Hull appendages
- Keel: daggerboard
- Rudder: transom-mounted rudder

Rig
- Rig type: Bermuda rig

Sails
- Sailplan: catboat
- Mainsail area: 38.00 sq ft (3.530 m^{2})
- Total sail area: 38.00 sq ft (3.530 m^{2})

The US Sabot is an American pram sailboat that was designed by Charles McGregor as a one-design racer and first built in 1939.

The design is a development of McGregor's Sabot, based upon the plans published in The Rudder magazine in 1939. The basic Sabot design has been widely adapted and other derivations include the leeboard-equipped Naples Sabot, as well as the daggerboard-equipped El Toro, Wind'ard Sabot and the Australian Holdfast Trainer.

== Production ==
The boat was originally intended for home construction from wood, by amateur builders. The design was later mass-produced by W. D. Schock Corp and Catalina Yachts in the United States, but it is now out of production.

== Design ==
The US Sabot is a recreational sailing dinghy. The early versions were built from plywood, while later production boats were made with hand-laid fiberglass hulls over cores, providing positive flotation. The boat has a cat rig, a squared pram stem, a nearly-plumb transom, a transom-hung rudder controlled by a tiller and a retractable square daggerboard. It displaces 68 lb (31 kg).

Catalina-produced Sabots have tapered fiberglass masts and anodized aluminum booms.

The boat has a draft of 1.30 ft (0.40 m) with the daggerboardextended. With the daggerboard removed it may be sailed in shallow water, beached or ground-transported on a trailer or automobile rooftop.

== Operational history ==
At one time the boat had a class club that organized racing events, the US Sabot Class Association, but by early 2013 its website had been taken down and it seems to be no longer active.

A 2013 review on boat.com noted that the design is, "the perfect first boat for the beginning sailor and popular with junior sailing programs for its simplicity and safety. Equipped with the racing package, the Sabot offers all the sail controls of a larger boat, so learning sailors can develop the full range of sail trimming skills."

Lynn Boats described the Catalina-made US Sabot as, "the perfect first boat for the beginning sailor. Simplicity and safety make the U.S. Sabot popular with junior programs ... The U.S. Sabot is built to withstand the tough use of a learning sailor."

== See also ==
- List of sailing boat types

Related development

- El Toro (dinghy)
- Holdfast Trainer
- Naples Sabot
- Sabot (dinghy)

Similar sailboats

- Optimist (dinghy)
