= Maria Mylona =

Greek sailor

Personal information
- Nationality: Greek
- Born: 10 August 1974 (age 50)

Sport
- Sport: Sailing

Maria Mylona (born 10 August 1974) is a Greek sailor. She competed in the Europe event at the 1996 Summer Olympics, where she ranked 22nd out of 28 competitors.
