= Sabot (dinghy) =

Type of sailing dinghy

- Fully rigged Sabot ready to sail

Development
- Design: Plywood; Fiberglass

Boat
- Crew: 1-2

Hull
- Type: Monohull, Pram dinghy
- Construction: One-Design
- Hull weight: 95 pounds (43 kg)
- LOA: 8 feet (2.4 m)
- Beam: 3 feet 9 inches (1.14 m)

Hull appendages
- Keel: leeboard

Rig
- Rig type: Bermuda

Sails
- Mainsail area: 44.132 square feet (4.1000 m^{2})

The Sabot is a type of sailing dinghy that is sailed and raced singlehandedly usually by young sailors in various parts of the world.

The boat is suitable for amateur production. Early models were usually made from plywood. More recent models have been made from fiberglass. Variations on the design include the daggerboard-equipped El Toro from the Richmond Yacht Club in San Francisco Bay Area, the US Sabot, the "Naples Sabot" from Naples community of Long Beach, California, as well as Australian varieties, such as the Holdfast Trainer.

Sabots returning to the clubhouse after a race

== See also ==
Related development

- El Toro (dinghy)
- Holdfast Trainer
- Naples Sabot
- US Sabot
- Optimist (dinghy)
