= Naples Sabot =

American sailing dinghy

Development
- Designer: Roy McCullough and R.A. Violette
- Location: Naples, Long Beach, California
- Year: 1946 (official plan released)
- Design: Plywood; Fiberglass

Boat
- Crew: 1 (Can fit 2 small children)

Hull
- Type: Monohull, Pram dinghy
- Construction: One-Design
- Hull weight: 95 pounds (43 kg)
- LOA: 8 feet (2.4 m)
- Beam: 4 feet (1.2 m)

Hull appendages
- Keel: Leeboard

Rig
- Rig type: Bermuda (Cat rig)

Sails
- Mainsail area: 38 square feet (3.5 m^{2})

The Naples Sabot is an 8-foot (2.4 m) sailing dinghy. The Naples Sabot was designed by Roy McCullough and R.A. Violette and the first two were built in Violette's garage during WW II, although official designs were not made available until 1946. The Naples Sabot is based on the Balboa Dinghy and on Charles MacGregor's Sabot as published in Rudder magazine, April 1939. It takes its name from Naples in Long Beach, California, where it was developed.

== Design ==
The Naples Sabot differs from the MacGregor in its use of a leeboard instead of a daggerboard or centerboard. The leeboard gives the boat additional versatility, making it easy to use as a rowboat and thus permitting it to be used as a tender or for fishing. Along with the leeboard the boat gained a small fixed keel, which assists when rowing or towing the dinghy.

Traditionally the hull of the Naples Sabot was built from plywood, but modern boats are produced in fiberglass. The boat uses a cat rigged mainsail which must be made from dacron or nylon, and the mast can be made from a variety of materials, including wood, aluminum and carbon fiber.

The sabot is the traditional first boat for juniors from Long Beach, CA to San Diego, CA, with the Optimist being more popular in the rest of the country. It has been long-debated which boat is a better choice. Sabots can be more expensive and difficult to sail, but the sail plan of a Sabot is more similar to the modern sloop design, having a standard mast and boom, which is used with most larger boats.

== Racing ==
The Naples Sabot is used mainly in Southern California, where it is used primarily to train young sailors. Adult women and men also race these boats. Regattas are held by International Naples Sabot Association (INSA) and the Southern California Women's Sailing Association (SCWSA) in various locations in harbors throughout Southern California.

Sailors of Naples Sabots can range from ages 5 or 6, as beginners, to older teens. There are also adult classes known as Senior Sabots. Junior regattas are divided into classes according to level of ability/experience, A, B, and C; sometimes in larger regattas there are classes C_{2} and C_{3}, to allow for more specific differentiation between the most advanced and the most novice.

A Sabot "Junior Nationals" regatta is held by INSA every year in August. The location of the Nationals alternates every year, mainly between Balboa Bay and Newport Harbor in Orange County, Alamitos Bay in Long Beach, and Mission Bay in San Diego. Almost all INSA sailors are associated with a yacht club, either because they are a member or a parent is a member, or because they participate in a club's junior program, as Sabots are sailed largely by children because of their small size and simple design. In Nationals (including tryouts) there are weight guidelines, which require the lighter (younger) skippers to carry weight in their boats to make it fair for older skippers who frequently weigh more and would be at a disadvantage.

Nationals begin with a two-day qualification regatta, to determine which sailors will compete in the actual competition. Skippers are divided randomly into color-coded fleets. After the two days of racing, the allotted number of skippers advance to the actual competition. The next day, another series of races is held to determine in which class each sailor will compete: iron, bronze, silver, and gold. Gold and Silver fleet sailors are automatically invited to the next year's regatta, and do not have to qualify. However, they do have to race to determine which fleet they will race in.

A Sabot "Senior Nationals" regatta is also held every year for skippers 18 and over, with classes divided by age and weight, instead of skill. It is held over 1 or 2 days depending on class, and sailed on Alamitos, Newport, or Mission Bay.

== See also ==
Related development

- El Toro (dinghy)
- Holdfast Trainer
- Sabot (dinghy)
- US Sabot
