= Holdfast Trainer =

South Australian sailing dinghy

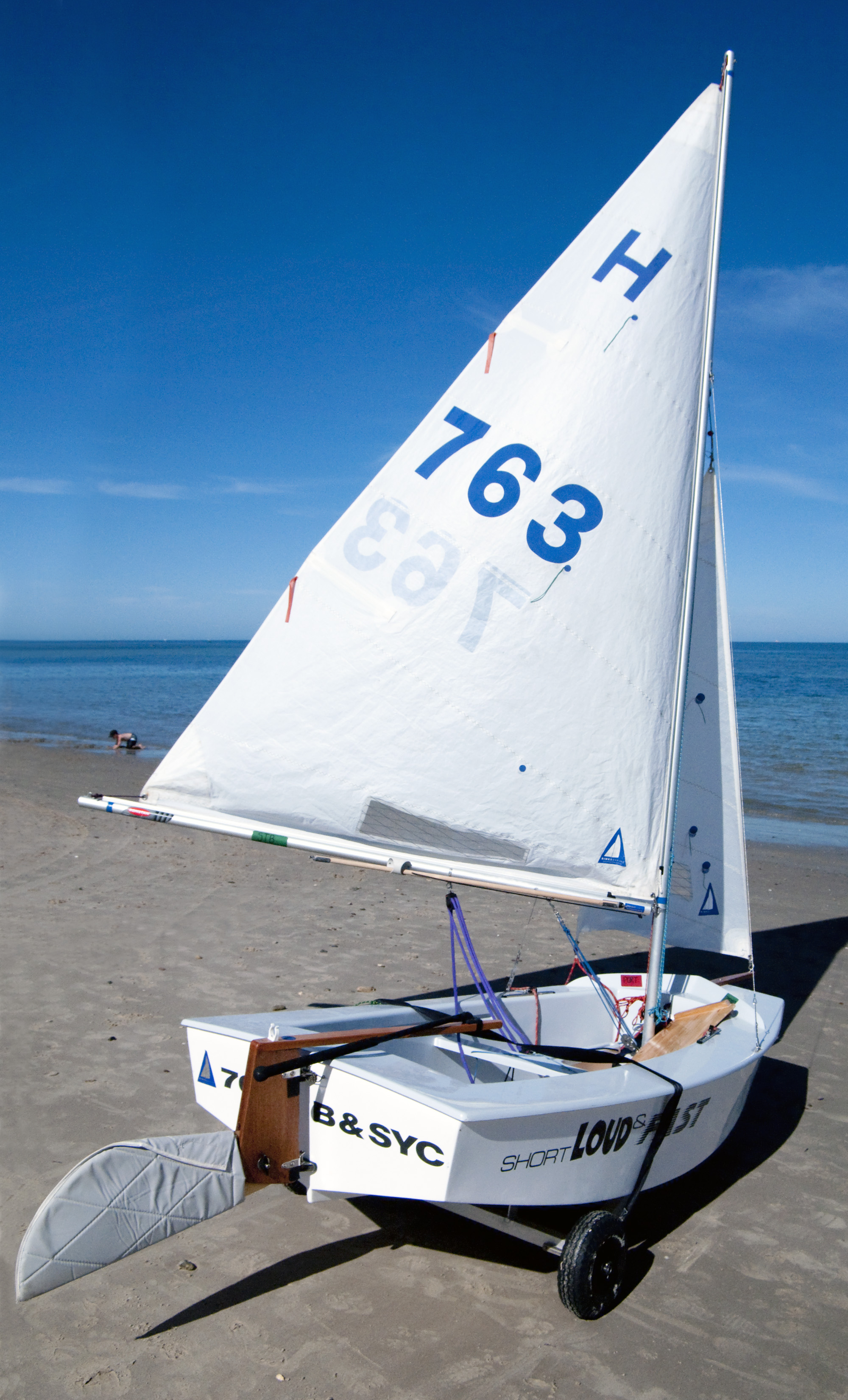
- Holdfast Trainer at Brighton, South Australia

Development
- Location: Holdfast Bay, South Australia
- Year: 1948
- Role: Sail trainer
- Name: Holdfast Trainer

Boat
- Crew: 2 people under the age of 16
- Trapeze: No

Hull
- LOH: 8 feet (2.4 m)

Hull appendages
- Keel: Daggerboard

Sails
- Spinnaker area: Whisker Pole to reverse jib down wind

The Holdfast Trainer is a South Australian sailing dinghy designed in 1948 for junior sailors under the required age of 16. Based on the Sabot, the class features a hard-chine wooden or fiberglass hull with a flat (or "pram") bow and a daggerboard. Unlike the Sabot, the Holdfast Trainer has both a main and a jib in order to facilitate a two-person crew and to teach jib handling. To make space for the jib, the mast was stepped further back and a bowsprit was added. Modern versions include waterproof bulkheads to provide additional flotation.

The boat has been sailed for many years by 8 to 15 year olds at South Australian sailing clubs, with the first state championships being held in 1958 and still continuing on today. One of those clubs, the Port Lincoln Yacht Club, has continuously sailed the dinghy for over 50 years, and held their 50th Anniversary celebrations for the class in 2010 at the recent states and metropolitan championships.

South Australian Premier Steven Marshall learned to sail in a Holdfast Trainer.

== See also ==
Related development

- El Toro (dinghy)
- Naples Sabot
- Sabot (dinghy)
- US Sabot
