= Helena Brodin (sailor) =

Swedish sailor

Personal information
- Nationality: Swedish
- Born: 6 August 1970 (age 54); Gothenburg, Sweden

Sport
- Sport: Sailing

Helena Brodin (born 6 August 1970) is a Swedish sailor. She competed in the Europe event at the 1992 Summer Olympics.
