= Optimist (dinghy) =

International racing sailing class

- Class symbol

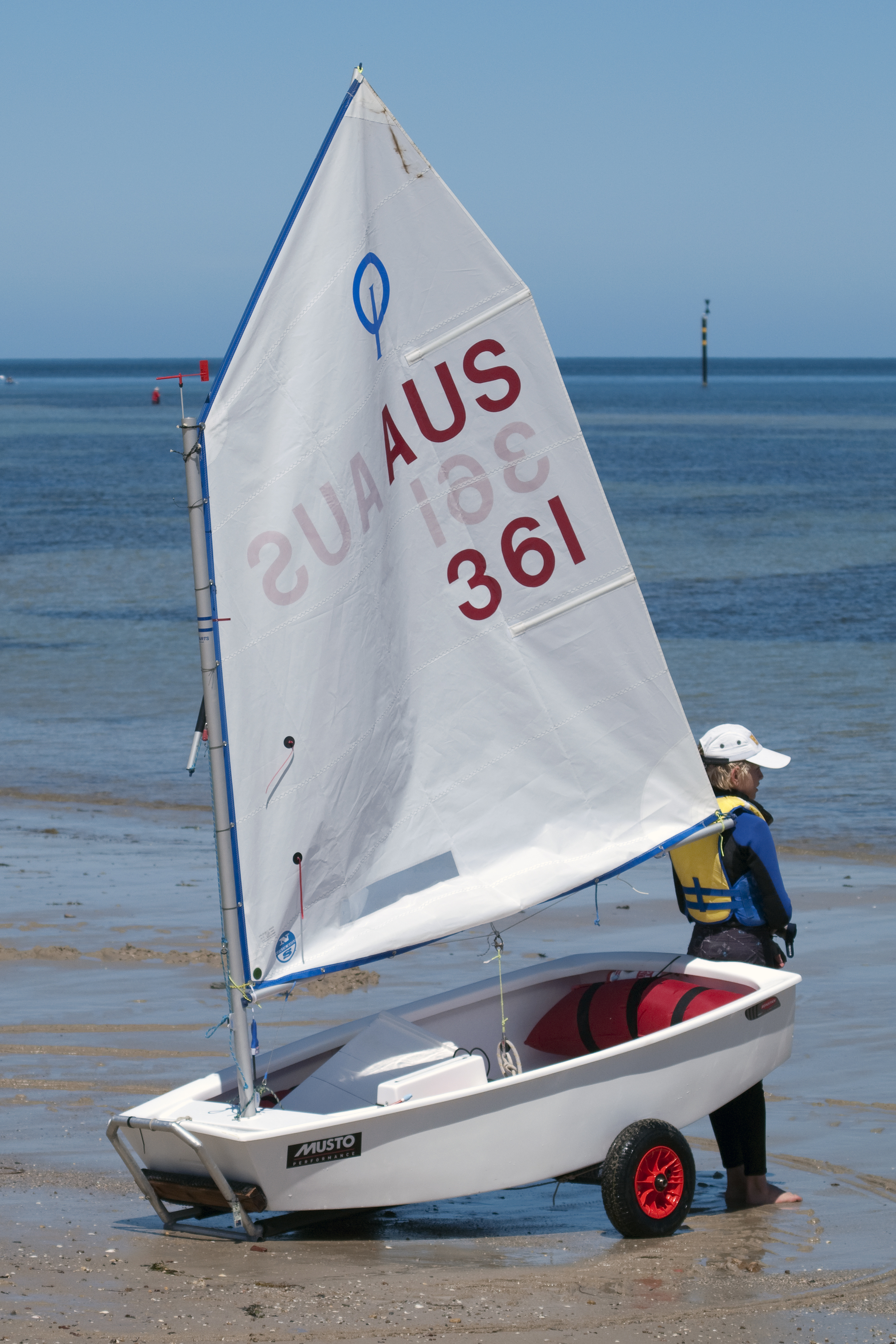

Development
- Location: International
- Design: One-Design

Boat
- Crew: 1
- Draft: 5 in (130 mm); 2 ft 9 in (0.84 m)

Hull
- Type: Monohull
- Construction: Fibreglass
- Hull weight: 77 lb (35 kg)
- LOA: 7 ft 9 in (2.36 m)
- LWL: 7 ft 2 in (2.18 m)
- Beam: 3 ft 8 in (1.12 m)

Hull appendages
- Keel: Daggerboard

Rig
- Rig type: Sprit-rigged
- Mast height: 7 ft 5 in (2.26 m)

Sails
- Mainsail area: 35 ft^{2} (3.3 m^{2})
- Jib/genoa area: None
- Spinnaker area: None

Rating
- D-PN: 123.6
- RYA PN: 1646

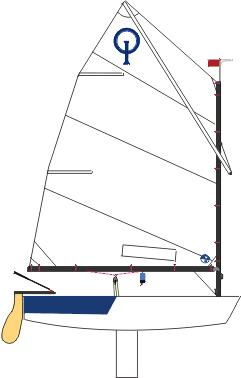
Optimist

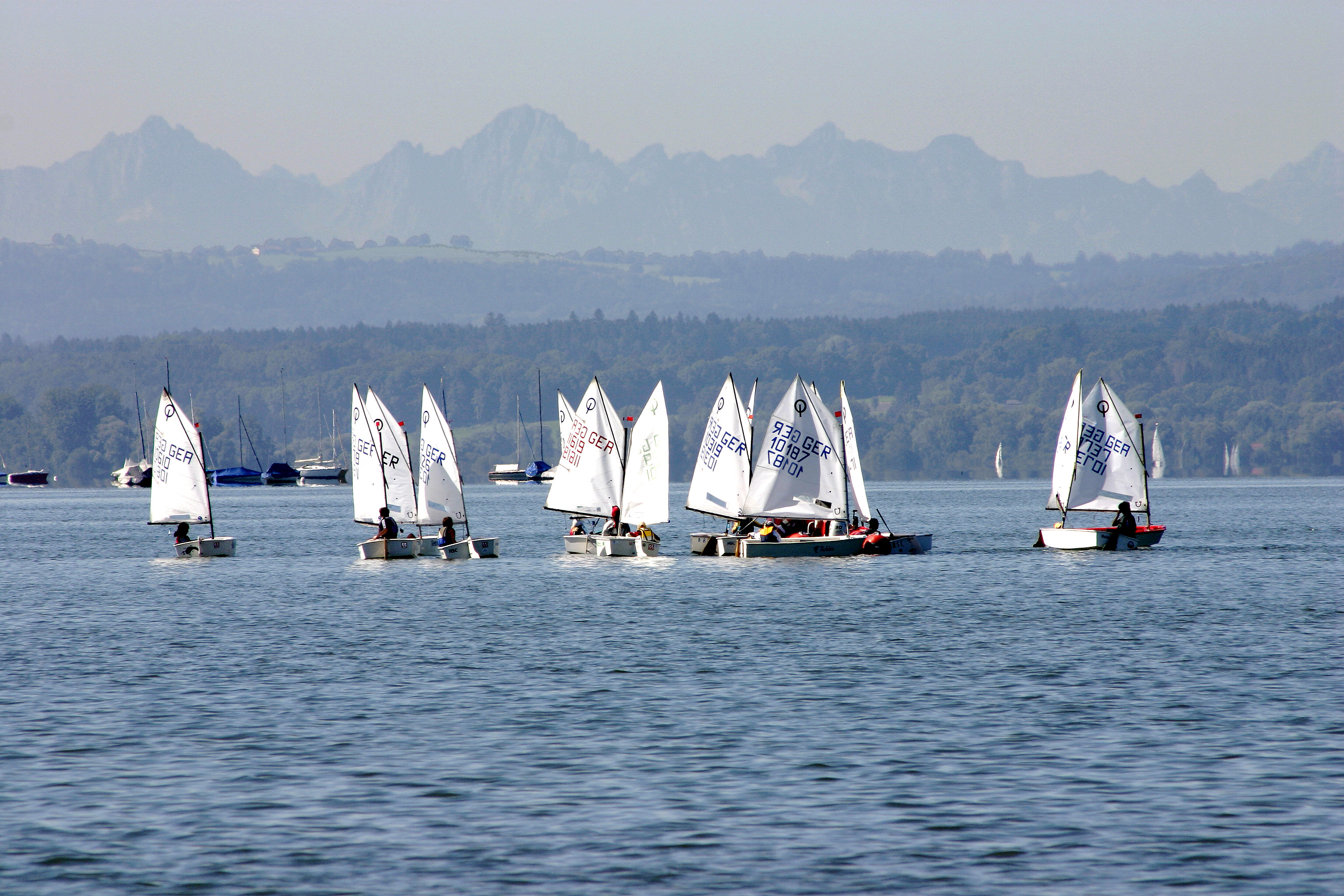
Fleet of Optimists

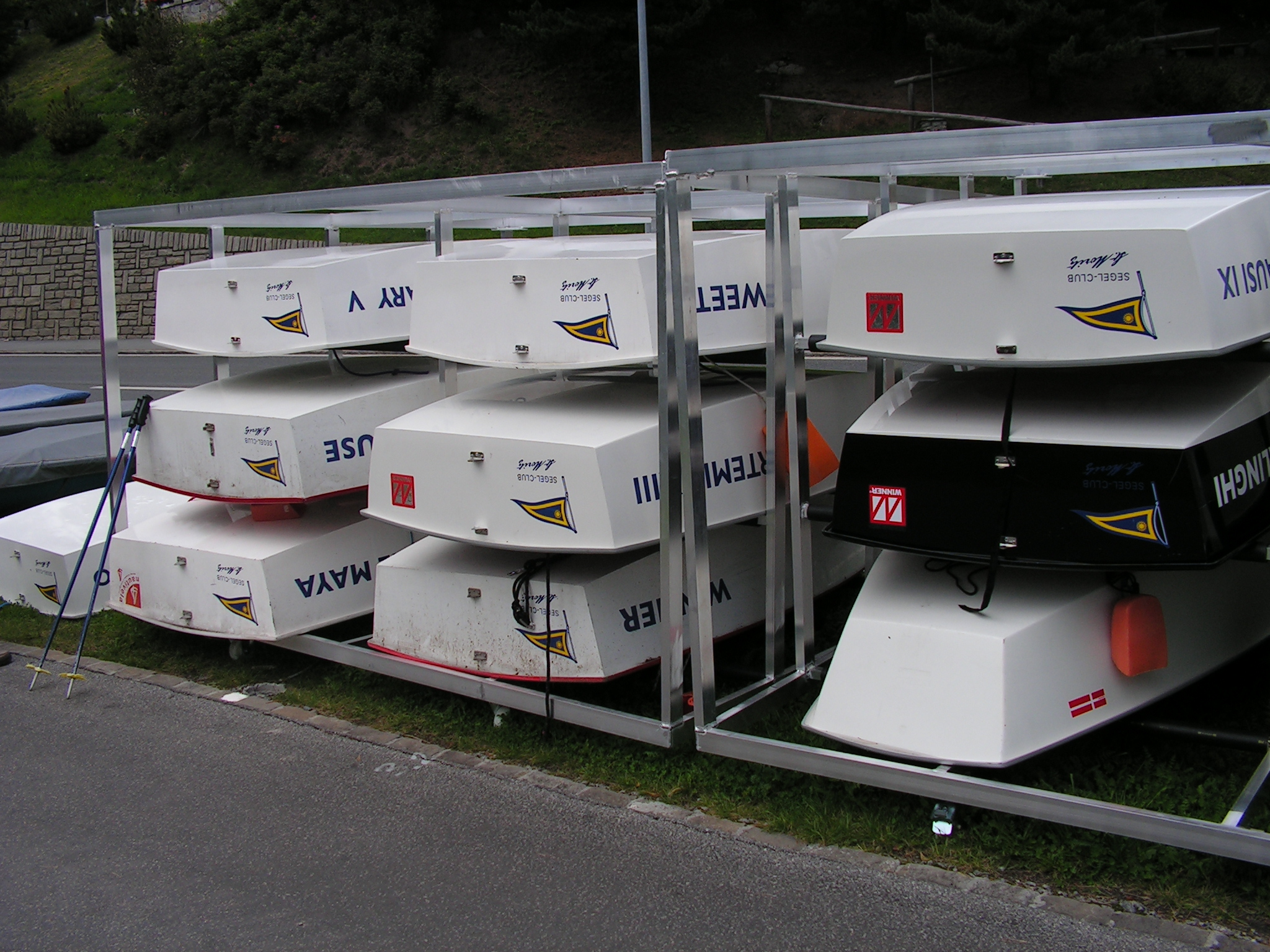
Typical Optimist storage

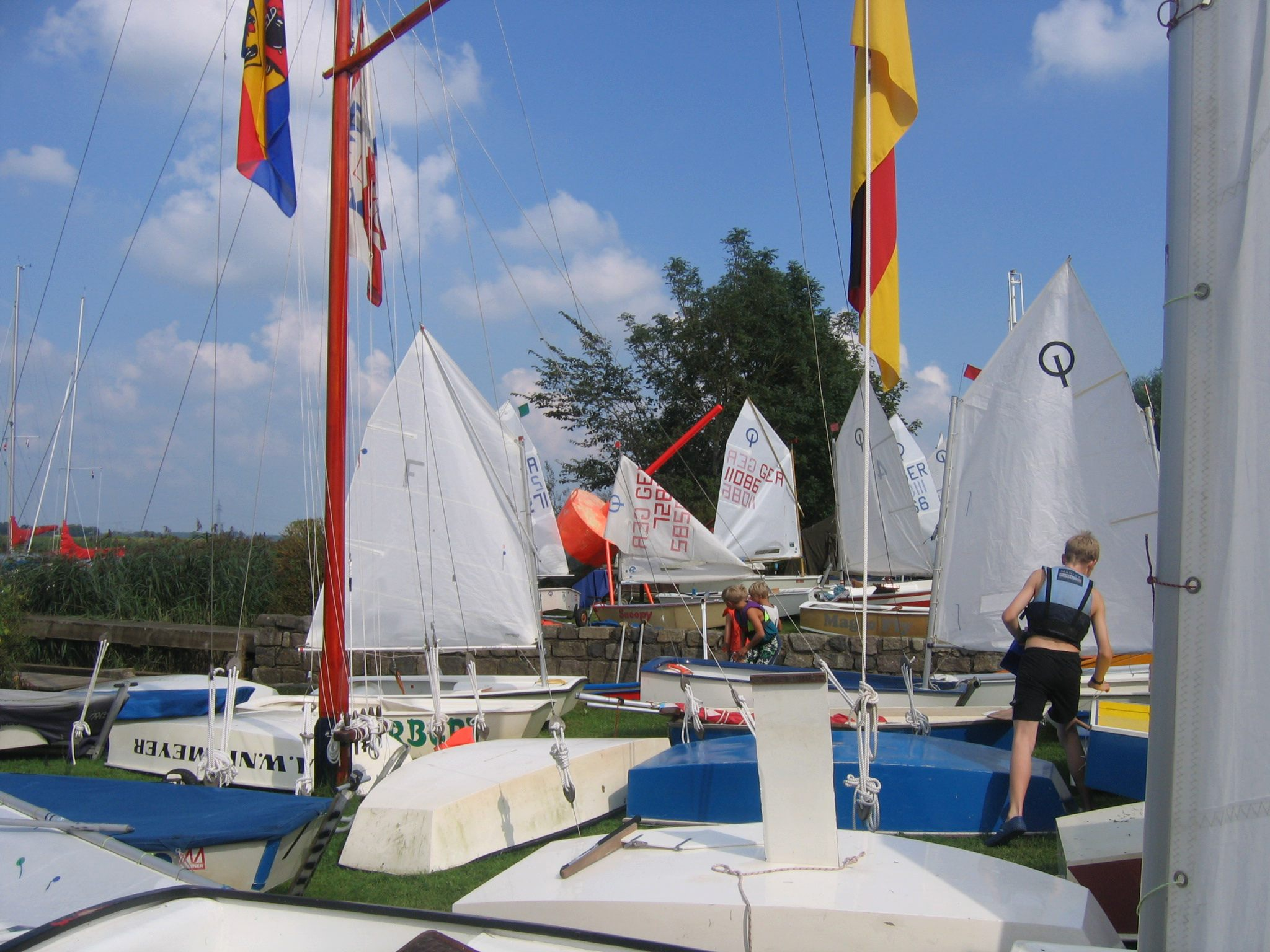
Rigging on shore

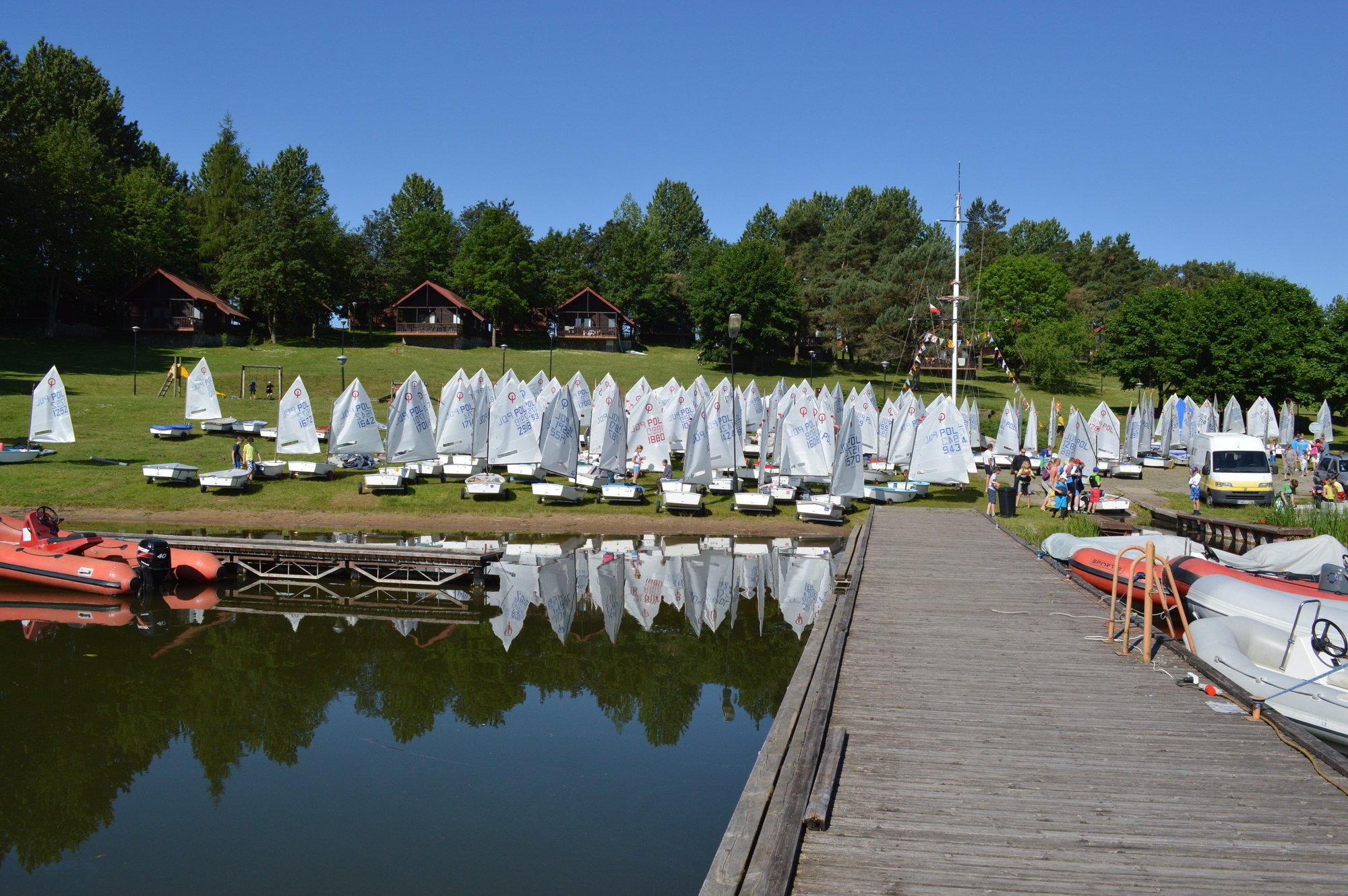
Optimist dinghies waiting for a wind

The Optimist, also known as Opti, is a small, single-handed sailing dinghy intended for use by young people up to the age of 15.

== Origin ==
The Optimist was designed in 1947 by American Clarke Mills at the request of the Clearwater Florida Optimist service club following a proposal by Major Clifford McKay to offer low-cost sailing for young people. The Optimist Club ran a soap box derby, but wanted more than a single-day event. Thus they were looking for a low-cost equivalent for sailing. The ultimate design was a simple pram that could be built from two four-foot-by-eight-foot sheets of plywood, that was donated to the Optimists.

The design was slightly modified and introduced to Europe by Axel Damgaard, and spread outwards across Europe from Scandinavia. The design was standardized in 1960 and became a strict one-design in 1995.

The forerunner of the Optimist was the eight-foot Sabot.

== Description ==
=== Rig ===
The single sail of the Optimist is sprit-rigged. Two battens stiffen the leech. It is secured evenly with ties along the luff to the mast and along the foot to the boom, pulled down tightly by a vang/kicker. The light, slim third spar, the sprit, extends through a loop at the peak of the sail; the bottom rests in the eye of a short cable or string which hangs along the front edge of the mast. Raising and lowering the sprit and adjusting the boom vang and outhaul allow for adaptation of sail trim to a range of wind conditions.

The spars may be made from aluminium or wood, but are invariably aluminium in modern boats.

A monograph-style "IO" insignia (after IODA – the International Optimist Dinghy Association) on the sail is a registered trademark and may only be used under licence from the International Optimist Association. Optimists also have a national sail number using the Olympic abbreviation of their country and a sequential numbers. e.g. RSA for South Africa.

=== Hull ===
The Optimist has a pram hull, originally formed primarily from five pieces of plywood. It was the biggest hull Clark Mills could make from two four-foot-by-eight-foot sheets. Just in front of a bulkhead, which partitions the boat nearly in half, is the daggerboard case. Right behind it on the centerline of the hull floor are attached a block and a ratchet block. These anchor the sheet and a block on the boom directly above. At the bow resides a thwart to support the mast which passes through a hole in its centre to the mast step mounted on the centre line of the boat. The painter, a rope used for securing a boat like a mooring line, is usually tied around the mast step.

Buoyancy bags are installed inboard along each side in the front half of the boat and at the stern to provide buoyancy in the event of capsizing. Two straps, known as "hiking straps", run lengthwise along the floor from the bulkhead to the stern. These and a tiller extension allow a sailor to hang off the side for weight distribution—commonly called "hiking out". This can be crucial to keeping the boat more upright during heavy air, allowing greater speed through the water.

The vast majority of hulls today are made of fiberglass, although a few wooden hulls are still made.

=== Daggerboard and rudder ===
The rudder and daggerboard are made from fibreglass, though plywood may be used for training and with wooden hulls.

=== Performance ===
While younger, lighter sailors begin in Optimists, competitive sailors usually weigh between 35 and 55 kg (or between 80 lbs. and 125 lbs.). Optimists can be sailed by children from age 7 to 15. This wide range of weights which is not typical of most dinghies is made possible by different cuts of sail. Due to its inherent stability, unstayed rig, robust construction and relatively small sail, the Optimist can be sailed in winds of up to 30 knots.

Optimists are manufactured to the same specification by over 20 builders on four continents. There is strong evidence that hulls from different builders are the same speed. Sails and spars of differing qualities enable sailors to upgrade their equipment as they progress.

The Optimist is the slowest dinghy in the world according to the RYA Portsmouth Yardstick scheme, with a Portsmouth number of 1646. Its equivalent rating in the US scheme is a D-PN of 123.6.

== Competition ==
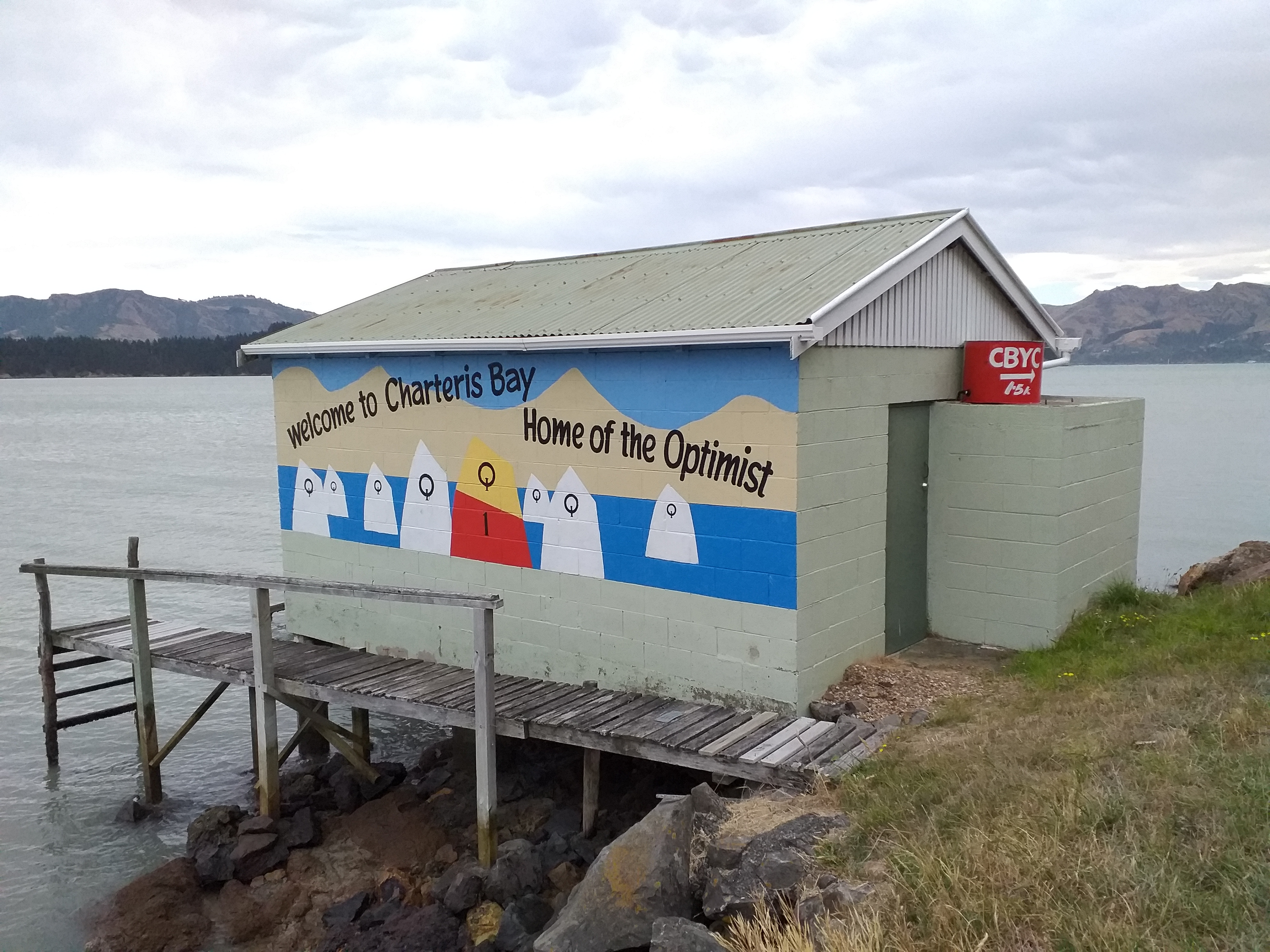
Shed marking the start of Optimist sailing in New Zealand

The Optimist is the biggest youth racing class in the world. As well as the annual world championship the class also has six continental championships, attended by a total of over 850 sailors a year. Many of the top world Optimist sailors have become world-class Laser Radial or 4.7 sailors after they "age-out" but many also excel in double-handers such as the 420 and 29er.

At the 2020 Olympics at least 75% of the boat skipper medalists were former Optimist world or continental championship sailors.

The first World Championship was held in Great Britain in 1962 and it has grown to over 60 countries participating. The changing pattern of the strongest countries can be seen from the results of the Nations Cup. For the first 20 years, the class was dominated by sailors from the Scandinavian countries, with 13 world champions. In the 1990s Argentina was by far the dominant country but, following standardisation of the boat and improved coaching standards internationally, many countries have excelled as shown in the results below. The Optimist World Championships include Team Racing which is increasingly popular.

Continental Championships are held on each continent (the Oceanian held jointly with the Asian).

With competitive charter boats easily available and low-cost airfares, there are scores of open international regattas. The largest is the Lake Garda Easter Meeting, with over 1,000 Optimists participating.

== Manufacture ==
In 2017, over 2,200 boats were produced by around 30 builders worldwide; from 2012 to 2017, over 13,500 boats were built.

== Events ==
=== World Championship ===
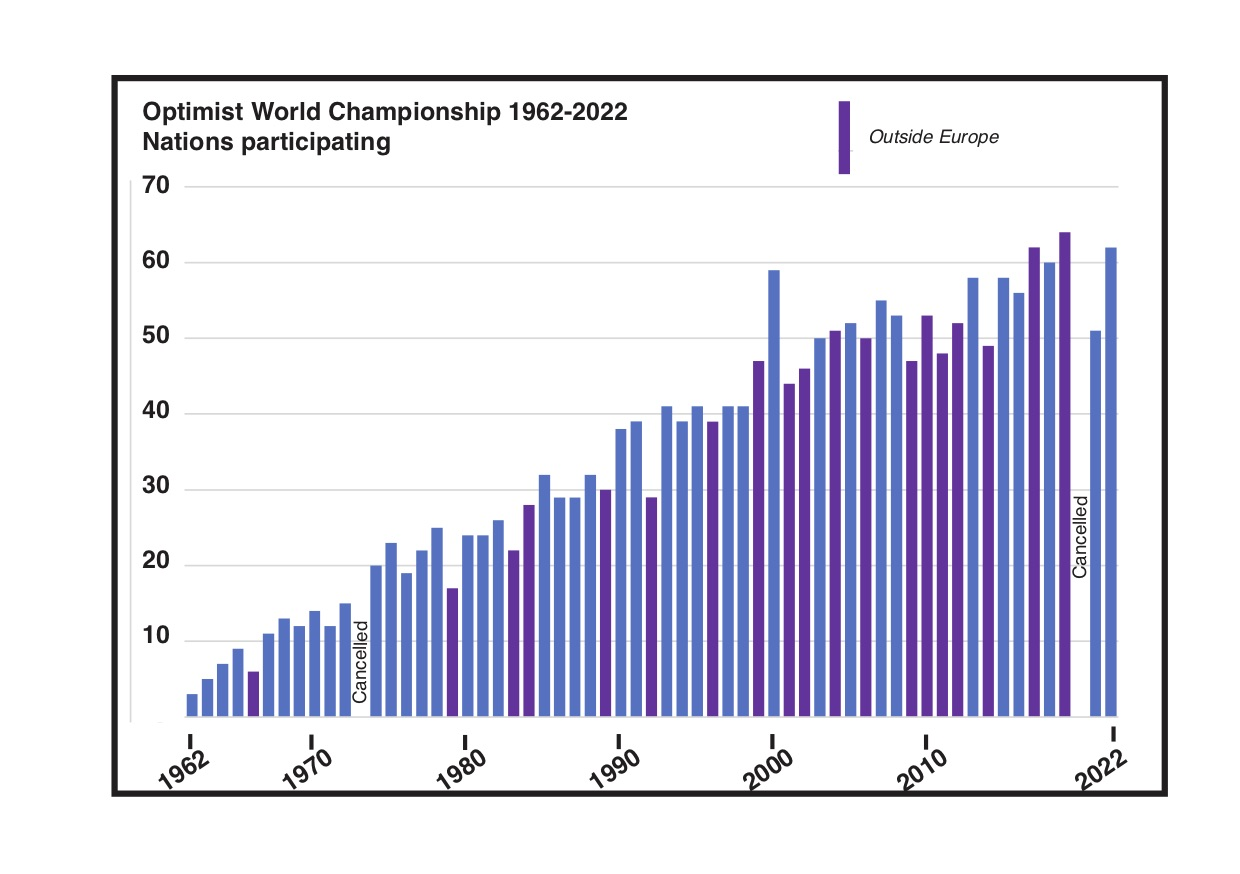
Nations at Optimist Worlds

Year	Gold	Silver	Bronze	Ref.
1962 Great Britain	A. Quiding (SWE)			
1963 Sweden	B. Baysen (SWE)			
1964 Denmark	Poul Andersen (DEN)			
1965 Finland	Ray Larsson (SWE)			
1966 Miami	Doug Bull (USA)			
1967 Austria	Peter Warrer (DEN)			
1968 France	Peter Warrer (DEN)			
1969 Great Britain	Doug Bull (USA)			
1970 Arenys de Mar	James Larimore (USA)			
1971 Malente	Heikki Vahtera (FIN)			
1972 Karlskrona	Tomás Estela (ESP)			
1973 Rhodesia	cancelled			
1974 St. Moritz/Silvaplana	Martín Billoch (ARG)			
1975 Aarhus	Hans Fester (DEN)	Söderström (SWE)	Martin Schröder (SWE)	
1976 Yarımca	Hans Wallén (SWE)	Asbjørn (DEN)	Lindsey (USA)	
1977 Koper	Patrik Mark (SWE)	Mads Damsgaard (DEN)	Evers (DEN)	
1978 La Baule	Rickard Hammarvid (SWE)	von Koskull (FIN)	Patrik Mark (SWE)	
1979 Pattaya	Johan Peterson (SWE)	Heiskanen (FIN)	Storgaard (DEN)	
1980 Cascais	Johan Peterson (SWE)	Rasmus Damsgaard (DEN)	Heiskanen (FIN)	
1981 Howth	Guido Tavelli (ARG)	Johan Peterson (SWE)	Edson Araujo (BRA)	
1982 Follonica	Njaal Sletten (NOR)	Christian Rasmussen (DEN)	Søren Ebdrup (DEN)	
1983 Rio de Janeiro	Jordi Calafat (ESP)	José Carlos Frau (ESP)	Jean-Pierre Becquet (FRA)	
1984 Kingston	Serge Kats (NED)	Jussi Wikström (FIN)	Xavier García (ESP)	
1985 Helsinki	Serge Kats (NED)	Risto Tapper (FIN)	Martín Castrillo (ARG)	
1986 Roses	Xavier García (ESP)	Luis Martínez (ESP)	Risto Tapper (FIN)	
1987 Andijk	Sabrina Landi (ITA)	Luis Martínez (ESP)	Anders Jonsson (SWE)	
1988 La Rochelle	Ugo Vanello (ITA)	Luis Martínez (ESP)	Gabriel Tarrasa (ESP)	
1989 Yokohama	Peder Rønholt (DEN)	Rami Koskinen (FIN)	Herman Rosso (ARG)	
1990 Portugal	Martín di Pinto (ARG)	Agustín Krevisky (ARG)	Martin Strandberg (SWE)	
1991 Porto Carras	Agustín Krevisky (ARG)	Asdrubal García (ARG)	Andre Sørensen (DEN)	
1992 Mar del Plata	Ramón Oliden (ARG)	Marc Patiño (ESP)	Mike Keser (GER)	
1993 Ciutadella de Menorca	Mats Hellman (NED)	Estebán Rocha (ARG)	Claudia Tosi (ITA)	
1994 Sardinia	Martín Jenkins (ARG)	Federico Pérez (ARG)	Julio Alsogaray (ARG)	
1995 Mariehamn	Martín Jenkins (ARG)	Frederico Rizzo (BRA)	Dario Kliba (CRO)	
1996 Langebaan	Lisa Westerhof (NED)	Aron Lolić (CRO)	Ivan Bertaglia (ITA)	
1997 Carrickfergus	Luca Bursic (ITA)	Matías Bühler (ARG)	Nicholas Raygada (PER)	
1998 Setúbal	Mattia Pressich (ITA)	Fernando Gwozdz (ARG)	Šime Fantela (CRO)	
1999 Martinique	Mattia Pressich (ITA)	Tonči Stipanović (CRO)	Mario Coutinho (POR)	
2000 A Coruña	Šime Fantela (CRO)	Lucas Calabrese (ARG)	Jaro Furlani (ITA)	
2001 Qingdao	Lucas Calabrese (ARG)	Zhu Ye (CHN)	Abdul Rahim (MAS)	
2002 Corpus Christi	Filip Matika (CRO)	Stjepan Ćesić (CRO)	Eduardo Zalvide (ESP)	
2003 Las Palmas	Filip Matika (CRO)	Jesse Kirkland (BER)	Sebastián Peri Brusa (ARG)	
2004 Salinas	Wei Ni (CHN)	Paul Snow-Hansen (NZL)	Eugenio Díaz (ESP)	
2005 St. Moritz	Tina Lutz (GER)	Matthew Schoener Scott (TRI)	Wu Jianan (CHN)	
2006 Montevideo	Julian Autenrieth (GER)	Griselda Khng (SIN)	Édgar Diminich (ECU)	
2007 Sardinia	Chris Steele (NZL)	Benjamín Grez (CHI)	Alex Maloney (NZL)	
2008 Çeşme	Raúl Ríos (PUR)	Ian Barrows (ISV)	Kristien Kirketerp (DEN)	
2009 Niterói	Sinclair Jones (PER)	Faizal Norizan (MAS)	Ignacio Rogala (ARG)	
2010 Langkawi	Noppakao Poonpat (THA)	Ahmad Syukri Abdul Aziz (MAS)	Keiju Okada (JPN)	
2011 Napier	Kimberly Lim (SIN)	Bart Lambriex (NED)	Javier Arribas (PER)	
2012 Boca Chica	Elisa Yukie Yokoyama (SIN)	Samuel Neo (SIN)	Jessica Goh (SIN)	
2013 Riva del Garda	Loh Jia Yi (SIN)	Nils Sternbeck (GER)	Edward Tan (SIN)	
2014 San Isidro	Nicolas Rolaz (SUI)	Voravong Rachrattanaruk (THA)	Dimitris Papadimitriou (GRE)	
2015 Dziwnów	Rok Verderber (SLO)	Jodie Lai (SIN)	Mathias Berthet (NOR)	
2016 Vilamoura	Max Wallenberg (SUI)	Mathias Berthet (NOR)	Fauzi Kaman Shah (MAS)	
2017 Pattaya	Marco Gradoni (ITA)	Fauzi Kaman Shah (MAS)	Mic Sig Kos Mohr (CRC)	
2018 Limassol	Marco Gradoni (ITA)	Stephan Baker (USA)	Panwa Boonnak (THA)	
2019 Antigua	Marco Gradoni (ITA)	Richard Schultheis (MLT)	Jaime Ayarza (ESP)	
2020 Riva del Garda	Canceled due to the COVID-19 pandemic.			
2021 Riva del Garda	Alex Di Francesco Kuhl (BRA)	Gil Hackel (USA)	Alex Demurtas (ITA)	
2022 Bodrum	Weka Bhanubandh (THA)	James Pine (USA)	Francesco Carrieri (ITA)	
2023 Sant Pere Pescador	Henric Wigforss (SWE)	Travis Greenberg (USA)	Wylder Smith (USA)	

== See also ==
- IceOptimist – iceboat with the Optimist rig

Related development

- El Toro
- Holdfast Trainer
- Naples Sabot
- Sabot
- US Sabot
