= Nicole Meylan-Levecque =

Swiss sailor

Personal information
- Nationality: Swiss
- Born: 6 November 1963 (age 61); Geneva, Switzerland
- Height: 168 cm (5 ft 6 in)
- Weight: 68 kg (150 lb; 10 st 10 lb)

Sport
- Sport: Sailing

Nicole Meylan-Levecque (born 6 November 1963) is a Swiss sailor. She competed at the 1992 Summer Olympics and 1996 Summer Olympics.
