= Pram (boat) =

Type of small boat

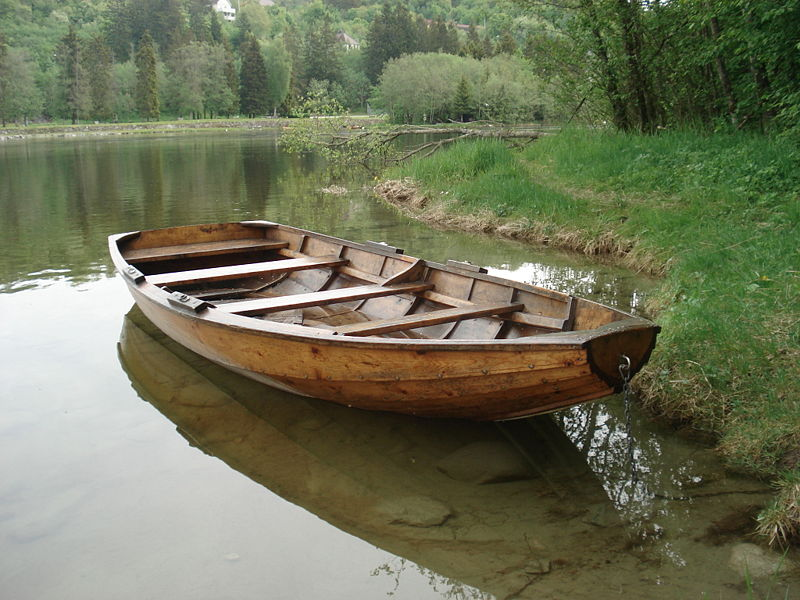
A Norwegian pram

A pram is a small boat type which is typically less than 8 feet in length. The pram is a utility dinghy with a transom bow rather than a pointed bow. This type of pram provides a more efficient use of space than does a traditional skiff of the same size. The Mirror and Optimist sailboats are examples of this form. Modern prams are often 8 to 10 feet long and built of plywood, fibreglass, plastic or aluminum. They are usually oar powered.

The Norwegian pram is commonly made of solid timber with much fore-and-aft rocker with a U-shaped cross section. In New Zealand and Australia the most common pram is an arc or v bottom rowboat commonly made of 6mm marine plywood often sealed with paint and/or epoxy resin. In the past often used as a tender; it has been replaced in this role by the small inflatable.

There is an unrelated type of ship called "pram" or "pramm".
